= Travancore sisters =

Trio of Indian actresses, dancers, and performers

From right to left: Padmini, Ragini and Lalitha

The Travancore sisters refers to the trio of Lalitha, Padmini, and Ragini, who were renowned actresses and dancers in Indian cinema. The three sisters performed in Malayalam, Tamil, Telugu, Hindi, and Kannada films.

The Travancore sisters were born into a joint Nair family and grew up at their ancestral tharavadu, Malaya Cottage, in Poojappura, Travancore. They were nieces of the celebrated beauty Narayani Pillai Kunjamma, who declined a marriage proposal from the King of Travancore and instead married the aristocratic landowner Kesava Pillai of Kandamath. Through her, the sisters were related to actress Sukumari's mother, Sathyabhama Amma, and to the Travancore royal family through their cousin Ambika.

They trained in classical dance under the renowned Indian dancers Guru Gopinath and T. K. Mahalingam Pillai. Uday Shankar invited them to Chennai (then Madras) to act in a dance-based film he was planning.

The matriarch of the family was Karthyayini Amma, wife of Panankavil Krishna Pillai of Cherthala, also known as Penang Padmanabha Pillai or P. K. Pillai. They had six sons, including Satyapalan Nair, a prominent producer of early Malayalam films. Another son, Raveendran Nair, was the father of Latika Suresh, a leading producer of Malayalam television programmes. The sisters performed at the 1955 Filmfare Awards.

Ragini died from cancer in 1976, Lalitha in 1982, and Padmini in 2006. Few documents related to them have survived, apart from numerous films and articles in Indian newspapers.

== Filmography ==
Dance and musical drama performances in films.

Year	Film	Language	Song	Singer	Music	Notes
1947	Kannika	Tamil	Dance Drama of Lord Siva and Mohini	Background Music	S. M. Subbaiah Naidu	Lalitha & Padmini
1948	Adhithan Kanavu	Tamil			G. Ramanathan	Lalitha & Padmini
1948	Bhaktha Jana	Tamil			Reema, Narayanan & BNR	Lalitha & Padmini
1948	Bhojan	Tamil			G. Ramanathan	Lalitha & Padmini
1948	Gnana Soundari	Tamil	Dance	Background Music	S. V. Venkatraman	Lalitha & Padmini
1948	Gokuladasi	Tamil			S. V. Venkatraman & C. N. Pandurangan	Lalitha & Padmini
1948	Mohini	Tamil	Aahaa Ivar Yaaradi	K. V. Janaki & P. Leela	S. M. Subbaiah Naidu & C. R. Subburaman	Lalitha & Padmini
1948	Vedhala Ulagam	Tamil	Vaasam Ulla Poo Parippene	T. S. Bagavathi & M. S. Rajeswari	R. Sudarsanam	Lalitha & Padmini
1948	Vedhala Ulagam	Tamil	Dance	Background Music	R. Sudarsanam	Lalitha & Padmini
1948	Vedhala Ulagam	Tamil	Ezhil Annam Vadivaagi Eduthheginen	P. A. Periyanayaki	R. Sudarsanam	Lalitha & Padmini
1948	Vedhala Ulagam	Tamil	Saantham Kolvaai En Sagodhariye	P. A. Periyanayaki	R. Sudarsanam	Padmini
1949	Deva Manohari	Tamil			G. Ramanathan	Lalitha & Padmini
1949	Kanniyin Kaadhali	Tamil			S. M. Subbaiah Naidu & C. R. Subburaman	Lalitha & Padmini
1949	Laila Majnu	Telugu	Amdala Chinna Daana	P. Leela & Jikki	C. R. Subburaman	Lalitha & Padmini
1949	Laila Majnu	Telugu	Eenaati Maa Paataa	P. Leela & Jikki	C. R. Subburaman	Lalitha & Padmini
1949	Laila Majnu	Tamil	Kuliridhe Suvai Madhu	P. Leela & Jikki	C. R. Subburaman	Lalitha & Padmini
1949	Laila Majnu	Tamil	Kannaadi Kanni Neeye	P. Leela & Jikki	C. R. Subburaman	Lalitha & Padmini
1949	Mangayarkarasi	Tamil	Dance	Background Music	G. Ramanathan, C. R. Subburaman & Kunnakudi Venkatarama Iyer	Lalitha & Padmini
1949	Naattiya Rani	Tamil		Papanasam Sivan		Lalitha & Padmini
1949	Pavalakkodi	Tamil	Konjum Kiliye		C. R. Subburaman	Lalitha & Padmini
1949	Vazhkai	Tamil	Uzhuthundu Vaazhvaar.... Paadupattaale Palan Koodum	T. S. Bagavathi & M. S. Rajeswari	R. Sudarsanam	Lalitha & Padmini
1949	Velaikaari	Tamil	Oridam Thanile Inaiyilla Ulaginile	P. Leela & K. V. Janaki	S. M. Subbaiah Naidu & C. R. Subburaman	Lalitha & Padmini
1949	Vinothini	Tamil			Srinivasa Iyengar	Lalitha & Padmini
1950	Digambara Samiyar	Tamil	Kaakka Vendum Kadavule Nee	A. G. Rathnamala & U. R. Chandra	S. M. Subbaiah Naidu & G. Ramanathan	Lalitha & Padmini
1950	Ithaya Geetham	Tamil	Juma Juma Jum Jum	P. A. Periyanayaki & P. Leela	S. V. Venkatraman	Lalitha & Padmini
1950	Jeevitham	Telugu	Bhoomi Dunnaloy Mana Desam	T. S. Bagavathi & M. S. Rajeswari	R. Sudarsanam	Lalitha & Padmini
1950	Krishna Vijayam	Tamil	Ennadi Aniyaayam Idhu	T. V. Rathnam & P. Leela	C. S. Jayaraman & S. M. Subbaiah Naidu	Lalitha & Padmini
1950	Manthiri Kumari	Tamil	O Raja O Rani Indha Ezhaiyeliya	P. Leela, N. Lalitha and U. R. Chandra	G. Ramanathan	Lalitha, Padmini & Ragini
1950	Marudhanaattu Ilavarasi	Tamil	Veerathaayai Panivom	P. Leela	M. S. Gnanmani	Lalitha & Padmini
1950	Parijatham	Tamil	Manamagizh Vasandha Kaalamidhe	Jikki & K. V. Janaki	S. V. Venkatraman & C. R. Subburaman	Lalitha & Padmini
1950	Ponmudi	Tamil	Vaanam Kumurudhamma	K. V. Janaki & N. Lalitha	G. Ramanathan	Lalitha & Padmini
1950	Vijayakumari	Tamil			C. R. Subburaman	Lalitha & Padmini
1951	Devaki	Tamil	Tea Tea Soodaana Tea	Jikki, A. G. Rathnamala & U. R. Chandra	G. Ramanathan	Lalitha, Padmini & Ragini
1951	Or Iravu	Tamil	Arumbu Pol Meesai.... Paartthu Paartthu Kanngal Rendum	M. S. Rajeswari, T. S. Bagavathi & V. J. Varma	R. Sudarsanam	Lalitha & Padmini with A. Nageswara Rao
1951	Singari	Tamil	Pasum Paalu Virkkum	P. A. Periyanayaki & P. Leela	S. V. Venkatraman, T. R. Ramanathan & T. A. Kalyanam	Lalitha & Padmini
1951	Sudharshan	Tamil	Unnai Kandu Mayamngaadha Pergal Undo	P. A. Periyanayaki	G. Ramanathan	Lalitha
1951	Sudharshan	Tamil	Ulagame Sandhai Koottamada.... Paaril Sandhai Koottam	P. A. Periyanayaki	G. Ramanathan	Lalitha
1951	Vanasundari	Tamil	Deeyo Deeyo Deeyaalo	P. A. Periyanayaki, P. Leela & K. V. Janaki	S. V. Venkatraman & C. R. Subburaman	Lalitha, Padmini & Ragini
1951	Vanasundari	Tamil	Pennin Inbam Naadida Vaareer	P. A. Periyanayaki & K. V. Janaki	S. V. Venkatraman & C. R. Subburaman	Lalitha & Padmini
1951	Vanasundari	Tamil	Inbamaaga Paaduvom Anbin Kaadhal Vaazhave	P. A. Periyanayaki & K. V. Janaki	S. V. Venkatraman & C. R. Subburaman	Lalitha & Padmini
1952	Amarakavi	Tamil	Mookkutthi Minnal Kannile	N. L. Ganasaraswathi & P. Leela	G. Ramanathan & T. A. Kalyanam	Lalitha & Padmini
1952	Amarakavi	Tamil	Mullaich Chirippile	N. L. Ganasaraswathi & P. Leela	G. Ramanathan & T. A. Kalyanam	Lalitha & Padmini
1952	Andhaman Kaidhi	Tamil	College Padippukku Goodbye Nam Kaadhal Vaazhvukkini Welcome	T. V. Rathnam & A. P. Komala	G. Govindarajulu Naidu	Lalitha & Padmini
1952	Dharma Devatha	Telugu	Lambadi Lambadi	K. Rani	C. R. Subburaman	Lalitha
1952	Dharma Devatha	Telugu	Pataku Pallavi	K. Rani	C. R. Subburaman	Lalitha
1952	Dharma Devatha	Telugu		K. Rani	C. R. Subburaman	Lalitha
1952	Dharma Devadhai	Tamil	Lambadi Lambadi	K. Rani	C. R. Subburaman	Lalitha
1952	Dharma Devadhai	Tamil	Aananda Leelai Tharum	K. Rani	C. R. Subburaman	Lalitha
1952	Dharma Devadhai	Tamil	Paaduven Paarungko	K. Rani	C. R. Subburaman	Lalitha
1953	Anbu	Tamil	Vendhazhalaai Erikkum Venmadhiye	A. P. Komala & N. L. Ganasaraswathi	T. R. Pappa	Lalitha & Padmini
1953	Marumagal	Tamil	Aanukkoru Penn Pillai	P. A. Periyanayaki, A. G. Rathnamala & A. P. Komala	G. Ramanathan, C. R. Subburaman & Viswanathan–Ramamoorthy	Padmini & Ragini with T. D. Kusalakumari
1953	Ponni	Tamil	Aaduvome Oonjal Aaduvome	A. P. Komala, P. A. Periyanayaki, Jayalakshmi & C. B. Radha	S. M. Subbaiah Naidu	Lalitha, Padmini & Ragini with Ambika
1956	Amara Deepam	Tamil	Jalilo Jimkana	Jikki	G. Ramanathan & T. Chalapathi Rao	Padmini with E. V. Saroja
1956	Amara Deepam	Tamil	Ellorum Koodi Aadi Paadi	Jikki	G. Ramanathan & T. Chalapathi Rao	Padmini
1956	Amara Deepam	Tamil	Pachchai Kilipaadudhu	Jikki	G. Ramanathan & T. Chalapathi Rao	Padmini
1956	Charana Daasi	Telugu	Yekkadunnadi Dharmamekkadunnadi	K. Rani & Jikki	S. Rajeswara Rao	Ragini with Ambika
1956	Madurai Veeran	Tamil	Summa Kidanthaa Sotthukku Nashtam	Jikki & P. Leela	G. Ramanathan	Lalitha & Ragini
1956	Sahasa Veerudu	Telugu	Somarulaithe Thindiki Nashtam	P. Susheela & Jikki	G. Ramanathan	Lalitha & Ragini
1956	Mathar Kula Manickam	Tamil	Denjaru Aiyaa Denjaru	T. V. Rathnam & G. Kasthoori	S. Rajeswara Rao	Ragini with Rita
1957	Baagyavathi	Tamil	Paruvam Malarndhu Asaindhu Aadum	Soolamangalam Rajalakshmi	S. Dakshinamurthy	Ragini
1957	Chakravarthi Thirumagal	Tamil	Kannaalane Vaarunga	Jikki	G. Ramanathan	Ragini
1957	Karpukkarasi	Tamil	Illaadha Adhisayamaai Irukkudhudhadi	A. P. Komala & K. Jamuna Rani	G. Ramanathan	Ragini with Rita
1957	Mallika	Tamil	Neela Vanna Kannane Unadhu	P. Susheela	T. R. Pappa	Padmini
1957	Mallika	Tamil	Mangaamal Valarum Singaara Nadanam	P. Susheela	T. R. Pappa	Padmini
1957	Manamagan Thevai	Tamil	Kaadhal Kalyaaname Seidha Paappaa	P. Leela	G. Ramanathan	Ragini
1957	Pardesi	Hindi	Na Dir Dhin Tana Dere Na	Lata Mangeshkar	Anil Biswas	Padmini
1957	Payal	Hindi	Jaa Re Saanwale Salone	Lata Mangeshkar	Hemanta Mukherjee	Padmini
1957	Payal	Hindi	Jhuki Jhuki Ankhiya	Lata Mangeshkar	Hemanta Mukherjee	Padmini
1957	Raja Rajan	Tamil	Aadum Azhage Azhagu	Soolamangalam Rajalakshmi & P. Leela	K. V. Mahadevan	Lalitha & Padmini
1956	Amar Deep	Tamil	Jali Lo Dim Tana	Asha Bhosle	C. Ramchandra	Padmini & Ragini
1956	Amar Deep	Tamil	Lagi Apni Najariya Katar Ban Ke	Asha Bhosle	C. Ramchandra	Padmini
1956	Amar Deep	Tamil	Mere Man Ka Bawra Panchhi	Lata Mangeshkar	C. Ramchandra	Padmini
1958	Mangalya Bhagyam	Tamil	Imaya Malaiyai Idadhu Kaiyaal	K. Jamuna Rani & A. G. Rathnamala	G. Ramanathan	Padmini
1958	Manamalai	Tamil	Nadanam Aadinaar	P.Leela & Radha Jayalakshmi	Vedha	Ragini with Sukumari
1958	Neelavukku Neranja Manasu	Tamil	Kannaikkavarum Baradhakalai	Soolamangalam Rajalakshmi	K. V. Mahadevan	Ragini
1958	Neelavukku Neranja Manasu	Tamil	Otrumaiye Namakku Uyirnaadi	Soolamangalam Rajalakshmi & Jikki	K. V. Mahadevan	Ragini with M. N. Rajam
1958	Ragini	Hindi	Main Bangaali Chhokraa	Asha Bhosle & Kishore Kumar	O. P. Nayyar	Padmini with Kishore Kumar
1958	Raj Tilak	Hindi	Aaja To Aaja	Asha Bhosle & Sudha Malhotra	C. Ramchandra	Padmini with Vyjayanthimala
1958	Uthama Puthiran	Tamil	Kaatthiruppaan Kamala Kannan	P. Leela	G. Ramanathan	Padmini & Ragini
1958	Uthama Puthiran	Tamil	Kondaattam Manasukkulle Kondaattam	P. Leela	G. Ramanathan	Padmini & Ragini
1958	Vanjikottai Valiban	Tamil	Kannum Kannum Kalanthu	P. Leela & Jikki	C. Ramchandra	Padmini with Vyjayanthimala
1958	Vijayakota Veerudu	Telugu	Kannu Kannu Kalipi	P. Leela & Jikki	C. Ramchandra	Padmini with Vyjayanthimala
1959	Nalla Theerpu	Tamil	Azhagaana Maaran	P. Leela	S. M. Subbaiah Naidu	Ragini
1959	Ponnu Vilaiyum Boomi	Tamil	Aangila Naagareegam Nalladhu	P. Susheela & K. Jamuna Rani	K. H. Reddy	Ragini with Sukumari
1959	Veerapandiya Kattabomman	Tamil	Anjatha Singam En Kaalai	P. Susheela	G. Ramanathan	Padmini
1959	Veerapandiya Kattabomman	Tamil	Takku Takku Takkunu	P. Susheela, A. P. Komala & S. Varalakshmi	G. Ramanathan	Padmini & Ragini
1959	Veerapandya Kattabrahmana	Telugu	Andala Basavanna	S. Janaki	G. Ramanathan	Padmini
1959	Veerapandya Kattabrahmana	Telugu	Takku Takku Bada Bada	S. Janaki, A. P. Komala & S. Varalakshmi	G. Ramanathan	Padmini & Ragini
1960	Amar Shaheed	Hindi	Alhad Jawan Mera Jaage	Lata Mangeshkar	Jamal Sen	Padmini
1960	Kalpana	Hindi	Tu Hai Mera Prem Devta	Mohammed Rafi & Manna Dey	O. P. Nayyar	Padmini & Ragini
1960	Mannadhi Mannan	Tamil	Kanniyar Perumai	P. Leela	Viswanathan–Ramamoorthy	Ragini
1960	Raja Desingu	Tamil	Pazhanimalai	P. Leela	G. Ramanathan	Ragini
1960	Raja Desingu	Tamil	Paarkadal Alaimele	M. L. Vasanthakumari	G. Ramanathan	Padmini
1961	Punar Jenmam	Tamil	Manam Aadudhu Paadudhu	S. Janaki & Jikki	T. Chalapathi Rao	Padmini & Ragini
1961	Sabarimala Ayyappan	Malayalam	Minnal Ente Kannu	P. Leela	S. M. Subbaiah Naidu	Padmini
1961	Sabarimalai Sri Ayyapan	Tamil	Minnal Endhan Kannu	P. Leela	S. M. Subbaiah Naidu	Padmini
1962	Kavitha	Tamil	Kannukkulle Onnirukku	K. Jamuna Rani & T. M. Soundararajan	K. V. Mahadevan	Ragini with Harban Lal
1962	Raani Samyuktha	Tamil	Mullaimalar Kaadu Engal Mananvan Ponnaadu	A. P. Komala	K. V. Mahadevan	Ragini
1962	Vikramaadhithan	Tamil	Nilaiyaana Kalai Vaahgave	P. Leela & T. V. Rathnam	S. Rajeswara Rao	Padmini & Ragini
1963	Chitor Rani Padmini	Tamil	Hum Tekaa Mele Shokkaa Aadum	S. Janaki	G. Ramanathan	Ragini
1967	Thiruvarutchelvar	Tamil	Mannavan Vandhaanadi	P. Susheela	K. V. Mahadevan	Padmini
1968	Thirumal Perumai	Tamil	Karaiyeri Meen Vilaiyaadum	P. Susheela & Soolamangalam Rajalakshmi	K. V. Mahadevan	Padmini with Rajasulochana
1968	Thillana Mohanambal	Tamil	Maraindhirundhu Paarkkum	P. Susheela	K. V. Mahadevan	Padmini
1968	Thillana Mohanambal	Tamil	Nalandhaanaa Nalandhaanaa	P. Susheela	K. V. Mahadevan	Padmini
1968	Thillana Mohanambal	Tamil	Tillana	Nadhaswaram Instrumental	K. V. Mahadevan	Padmini
