= List of Tamil films of 1951 =

The following is a list of films produced in the Tamil film industry in India in 1951, in alphabetical order.

== 1951 ==
Title	Director	Production	Music	Cast	Release date (D-M-Y)
Anni	K. S. Prakash Rao	Prakash Productions	Pendyala Nageswara Rao	G. Varalakshmi, Master Sethu, Master Sudhakar, Annapoorna, K. Sivaram	01-09-1951
Devaki	R. S. Mani	Ganapathi Pictures	G. Ramanathan	V. N. Janaki, N. N. Kannappa, Madhuri Devi, S. Balachander, D. Balasubramaniam, A. Karunanidhi, V. M. Ezhumalai	21-06-1951
Grama Penn (Dubbed from Hindi)	S. U. Sunny	Sunny Art Pictures	Naushad	Nargis, Dilip Kumar, Munawar Sultana	
Kaithi	S. Balachander	Jupiter Pictures	S. Balachander	S. Balachander, S. A. Natarajan, S. Revathi, V. Meenakshi, M. K. Mustafa, G. M. Basheer, K. Malathi	23-12-1951
Kalavathi	L. S. Ramachandran	Windsor Productions	M. S. Gnanamani	T. S. Durairaj, T. A. Jayalakshmi, E. R. Sahadevan, C. T. Rajakantham, Sriram, K. S. Rajam	23-02-1951
Lavanya	G. R. Lakshmanan	Eastern Art Production	S. V. Venkatraman	T. E. Varadan, Suryaprabha, Vanaja, Kumari Kamala, Pulimoottai Ramaswami, T. S. Jaya	26-05-1951
Malai Kalvan	A. S. Jackal	Jalal Films		G. M. Basheer, Gulsaar	
Manamagal	N. S. Krishnan	N. S. K. Films	C. R. Subburaman	S. V. Sahasranamam, Padmini, T. S. Balaiah, Lalitha, N. S. Krishnan, T. A. Madhuram, T. S. Durairaj	15-08-1951
Marmayogi	K. Ramnoth	Jupiter Pictures	S. M. Subbaiah Naidu; C. R. Subburaman	M. G. Ramachandran, Anjali Devi, S. V. Sahasranamam, Madhuri Devi, Serukulathur Sama	02-02-1951
Mayamalai	Raja of Mirzapur	Sobhanachala Pictures	P. Adinarayana Rao	A. Nageswara Rao, Anjali Devi, M. V. Mani, Suryaprabha, C. S. D. Singh, Sairam, Menaka	16-03-1951
Mayakkari	P. Sridhar	Aswini Pictures	P. Adinarayana Rao	A. Nageswara Rao, Anjali Devi, Kasturi Siva Rao, C. Lakshmi Kantham, Raja Reddy, Surabhi Balasaraswathi	07-12-1951
Mohana Sundaram	A. T. Krishnaswamy	Sukumar Productions Limited	T. G. Lingappa	T. R. Mahalingam, S. Varalakshmi, B. R. Panthulu, K. Sarangapani, V. Susheela	21-07-1951
Nadigai; Dubbed from Malayalam	T. Janaki Ram	Swami Narayanan	G. K. Venkatesh	Kottarakkara Sreedharan Nair, Miss Kumari	
Niraparadhi	H. M. Reddy	Rohini Pictures	Ghantasala & H. R. Padmanabha Sastry	Anjali Devi, G. Varalakshmi, Mukkamala, Kanta Rao, C. Lakshmi Kantham	09-03-1951
Or Iravu	P. Neelakantan	AVM Productions	R. Sudharsanam	K. R. Ramasamy, A. Nageswara Rao, Lalitha, T. K. Shanmugam, T. S. Balaiah, B. S. Saroja, T. S. Durairaj, T. P. Muthulakshmi	11-04-1951
Pathala Bhairavi	K. V. Reddy	Vijaya Productions	Ghantasala	N. T. Rama Rao, K. Malathi, C. S. R. Anjaneyulu, Relangi, Girija, Hemalathamma Rao, Valluri Balakrishna	17-05-1951
Pichaikkari	K. Vembu	K & K Combines	V. Dakshinamoorthy	Thikkurissy Sukumaran Nair, B. S. Saroja, P. Adhimoolam, Pankajavalli, S. P. Pillai, Sebastian Kunjukunju Bhagavathar	18-05-1951
Rajambal	R. M. Krishnaswamy	Aruna Films	M. S. Gnanamani; S. Balachander (Background)	R. S. Manohar, P. K. Saraswathi, Madhuri Devi, K. Sarangapani, S. Balachander, Friend Ramasami, T. P. Muthulakshmi	14-09-1951
Samsaram	Chandru	Gemini Studios	Emani Sankara Sastry; M. D. Parthasarathy	M. K. Radha, Pushpavalli, Sriram, Kumari Vanaja, T. R. Ramachandran, Sundari Bai	19-10-1951
Sarvadhikari	T. R. Sundaram	Modern Theatres	S. Dakshinamurthy	M. G. Ramachandran, Anjali Devi, M. N. Nambiar, V. Nagayya, A. Karunanidhi, T. P. Muthulakshmi	14-09-1951
Satyavatharam		Arunodai Kalamandhir			
Saudamini	K. B. Nagabhushanam	Sri Rajarajeswari Films	S. V. Venkatraman	M. K. Radha, P. Kannamba, A. Nageswara Rao, S. Varalakshmi, T. R. Ramachandran, T. R . Rajani, K. S. Angamuthu, Kumari Vanaja	14-04-1951
Singari	T. R. Raghunath	National Pictures	S. V. Venkatraman; T. R. Ramanathan; T. A. Kalyanam	T. R. Ramachandran, Lalitha, Padmini, Ragini, S. V. Sahasranamam, D. Balasubramaniam, V. K. Ramasamy, K. A. Thangavelu, C. K. Saraswathi, M. S. S. Bhagyam	29-10-1951
Sthree Sahasam	Vedantam Raghavayya	Vinodha Pictures	C. R. Subburaman	A. Nageswara Rao, Anjali Devi, C. S. R. Anjaneyulu, Kasturi Siva Rao, Surya Prabha, Relangi, Girija	16-11-1951
Sudharshan	Sundar Rao Nadkarni; A. S. A. Sami	Royal Talkies Distributors	G. Ramanathan	P. U. Chinnappa, P. Kannamba, (Yogam) Mangalam, Lalitha, T. S. Balaiah, D. Balasubramaniam, Master A. L. Raghavan	28-11-1951
Unmaiyin Vetri	Haribhai. R. Desai	D. S. P. Film Syndicate	T. A. Kalyanam	S. Vasan, Menaka, N. S. Subbaiah, T. A. Jayalakshmi, C. T. Kannapiran, T. K. Govindan	01-01-1951
Vanasundari	T. R. Raghunath	Krishna Pictures	S. V. Venkatraman; C. R. Subburaman	P. U. Chinnappa, T. R. Rajakumari, T. S. Balaiah, S. Varalakshmi, N. S. Krishnan, T. A. Madhuram	09-02-1951
