= C. R. Subbaraman =

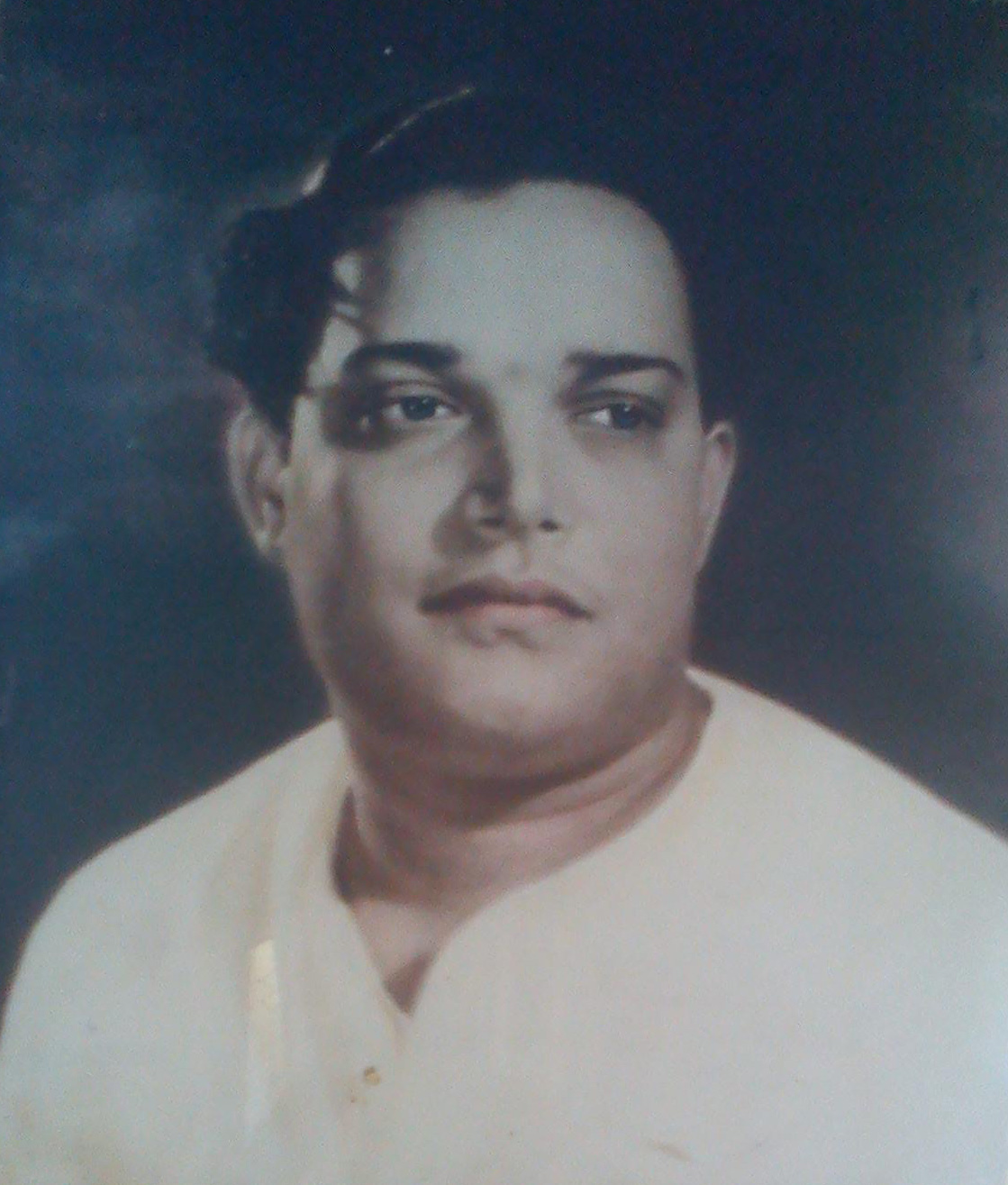

Background information
- Born: 18 May 1916
- Origin: Chintamani, Tinnevely District, Madras Presidency, British India (now Tirunelveli district, Tamil Nadu, India)
- Died: 27 June 1952 (aged 36) Madras, Madras State (now Chennai, Tamil Nadu) India
- Occupations: Film score composer, Music Director, Film Producer
- Instrument: keyboard/harmonium/piano
- Years active: 1943 to 1952

Chintamani Ramasamy Subbaraman, also known as C. S. Ram (1916–1952), was a famous South Indian film music composer and producer. He was born to Ramasamy at Chintamani village in Thirunelveli, in present-day Tamil Nadu. Music director Shankar of Shankar–Ganesh duo was his younger brother. His ancestors were from the Krishna district of present-day Andhra Pradesh and due to this, his family spoke Telugu well.

During his short lifespan of about 36 years and cinema life of 10 years, he gained lasting fame with films like Devadasu, Ratnamala, Chenchu Lakshmi, Balaraju, Laila Majnu and others.

== Early life ==
Little is known about the music teachers of Subbaraman. Initially he had learned music from a Nadhaswaram player in Kumbakonam. He was a remarkable learner: whatever he practised during the morning he was able to deliver in the evening. He was well versed in harmonium at the age of 14.

At the age of 16, on the recommendation of G. Ramanathan's brother Sundara Bagavathar, Subbaraman joined His Master's Voice as a Harmonist. His Master's Voice was a gramophone production and distribution company, under which there was a permanent orchestra led by R. Chinnaiah. S. Rajeswara Rao also was with His Master's Voice. At that time, Ramasamy Iyer and Subbaraman were residing in Mylapore. Accompanied by his father, he would walk all the way to learn piano from a piano teacher in Triplicane (Thiruvallikkeni). Owing to his talent and passion towards music, he became the assistant music director in His Master's Voice very quickly.

Subbaraman would sing keerthanas in the nights after work. He would be accompanied by a young violinist who had been a temporary worker in His Master's Voice. Sensing the talent, Subbaraman had not only recommended the young chap to be hired permanently in His Master's Voice but also appointed him as his assistant. The talented young violinist was no other than T. K. Ramamoorthy.

== Career ==
When His Master's Voice was offered to compose music for cinema under the banner Tamil Nadu Talkies for the Telugu film Chenchu Lakshmi (1943), R. Chinnaiah had the opportunity as the music director.

=== First film ===
When R. Chinnaiah suddenly fell ill after completion of 1 or 2 songs the task was taken up by S. Rajeswara Rao. Due to some unavoidable reasons Rajeswara Rao was not able to complete the songs and the opportunity was given to Subbaraman. Subbaraman completed the rest of the songs with the assistance of Samudrala Sr. He had boldly introduced some changes in the music field of those days by introducing Latin American music along with carnatic music and won accolades of the viewers. Chenchu Lakshmi was a success which hoisted Subbaraman as a music director for cinema.

At the same time R. Chinnaiah died, and Subbaraman took over the responsibilities to lead the His Master's Voice orchestra. His compositions were well received in the market. He had won praises from higher authorities of His Master's Voice which were based in Kolkata, an Englishman who had written to Subbaraman congratulating him for the magnificent sales which had resulted from the remarkable music composition. But due to the inconsistent salary, Subbaraman had to leave His Master's Voice to look for a permanent remuneration.

=== Debut into films ===
M. K. Thyagaraja Bhagavathar (MKT) had been listening and was pleased with the music. He invited Subbaraman to compose music for his next venture, 'Uthayanan' (1945). It was a dream of the music directors of that era that to compose music from MKT's songs. Subbaraman had worked day and night profusely to have put out the best tunes. MKT came to the recording theatre, was briefed about the tunes, and was prepared to sing when the recording was interrupted by his Mamundi Achari and MKT needed to leave. MKT was arrested later in the evening for the murder of Lakshmikanthan. Uthayanan has been temporarily halted. But when MKT was sentenced to jail, the producer proceeded to make the movie with G. N. Balasubramaniam. Subbaraman was replaced by C. S. Jayaraman.

The next movie chance came in 1947 where he started to work with Bharani Pictures which belongs to P. Bhanumathi for Ratnamala with Ghantasala. Initially he composed for all the films produced by Bharani then onwards till his death. From Laila Majnu, Prema till Chandirani. For his last three hits Marumagal, Devadas and Chandi Rani released in 1953 he managed to compose all the songs well in advance, but died during the composition of background music to be completed by his assistants M. S. Viswanathan & T. K. Ramamoorthy.

In 1948, he started composing for Prathiba Pictures which belongs to Ghantasala Balaramayya beginning with Balaraju, Swapna Sundari and Sri Lakshmamma Katha.

In 1948 also, Subbaraman composed music for Raja Mukthi of M. K. Thyagaraja Bhagavathar starrer. Subbaraman also worked with N. S. Krishnan in Paithiyakkaran (1947), Nallathambi (1949) and Manamagal (1951).

When Jupiter Pictures moved to Madras, it was S. M. Subbaiah Naidu recommended his talented assistant M. S. Viswanathan to Subbaraman to be taken as his assistant which Subbaraman had accepted.

He worked with singers like Ghantalasa, A. M. Rajah, Thiruchi Loganathan, V. N. Sundharam, T. A. Mothi, M. L. Vasanthakumari, P. A. Periyanayaki, P. Leela, T. V. Rathnam, R. Balasaraswathi Devi, A. P. Komala, K. Jamuna Rani, K. Rani, P. Susheela and K. V. Janaki.

The singing actors M. K. Thyagaraja Bhagavathar, P. U. Chinnappa, C. S. R. Anjaneyulu, U. R. Jeevarathinam, T. R. Mahalingam, T. R. Rajakumari, K. R. Ramasamy, V. Nagayya, P. Bhanumathi, N. S. Krishnan, T. A. Madhuram and S. Varalakshmi also sang memorable songs under his compositions.

=== Vinoda Pictures ===
He became one of the partners along with lyricist Samudrala Sr., director/kuchipudi dancer Vedantam Raghavayya and producer D.L. Narayana and started Vinoda Pictures in 1950. They had produced Strisahasam, Shanti and Devadasu/Devadas. Subbaraman had composed 6 to 7 songs for Devadasu/Devadas when he died suddenly. Then, M. S. Viswanathan & T. K. Ramamoorthy completed the balance three songs.

Subbaraman had been instrumental in introducing Ghantasala to Tamil film by the movie Paithiyakaran (1947) and also made debut of M. L. Vasanthakumari in Raja Mukthi (1948). Subbaraman also gave lessons to P. Leela and a chance to sing under his compositions, which made her very famous. He was a trendsetter in music composition during his heyday.

All of the films with music composed by him have been highly successful. He had composed more for Telugu films than Tamil films. He died at the very young age of 36 after a long battle with illnesses. The rest works were done by Viswanathan–Ramamoorthy duo.

== Filmography ==
=== Music director ===
Year	Film	Language	Director	Banner	Co-Music Director
1943	Chenchu Lakshmi	Telugu	S. Soundararajan	Tamil Nadu Talkies	R. Chinnaiah & S. Rajeswara Rao
1946	Lavangi	Tamil	Y. V. Rao	Sri Jagadish Pictures	H. R. Padmanabha Sastry
1947	Udayanan Vasavadatta	Tamil	T. R. Raghunath	Uma Pictures	
1947	Paithiyakkaran	Tamil	Krishnan–Panju	N. S. K. Films	M. S. Gnanamani
1948	Ratnamala	Telugu	P. S. Ramakrishna Rao	Bharani Pictures	Ghantasala
1948	Balaraju	Telugu	Ghantasala Balaramaiah	Prathiba Films	Ghantasala & Gali Penchala Narasimha Rao
1948	Abhimanyu	Tamil	M. Somasundaram & A. Kasilingam	Jupiter Pictures	S. M. Subbaiah Naidu
1948	Raja Mukthi	Tamil	Raja Chandrasekhar	Narendra Pictures	
1948	Mohini	Tamil	Lanka Sathiyam	Jupiter Pictures	S. M. Subbaiah Naidu
1949	Kanniyin Kaadhali	Tamil	K. Ramnoth	Jupiter Pictures	S. M. Subbaiah Naidu
1949	Laila Majnu	Tamil	P. S. Ramakrishna Rao	Bharani Pictures	
1949	Laila Majnu	Telugu	P. S. Ramakrishna Rao	Bharani Pictures	
1949	Mangayarkarasi	Tamil	Jiten Banerjee	Bhagya Pictures	G. Ramanathan & Kunnakudi Venkatarama Iyer
1949	Nallathambi	Tamil	Krishnan–Panju	Uma Pictures & N. S. K. Films	
1949	Pavalakkodi	Tamil	S. M. Sriramulu Naidu	Pakshiraja Studios	
1949	Ratnakumar	Tamil	Krishnan–Panju	Murugan Talkies	G. Ramanathan
1949	Velaikkaari	Tamil	A. S. A. Sami	Jupiter Pictures	S. M. Subbaiah Naidu
1950	Sri Lakshmamma Katha	Telugu	Ghantasala Balaramaiah	Pratibha Productions	
1950	Lakshmamma	Tamil	Ghantasala Balaramaiah	Pratibha Productions	
1950	Macha Rekai	Tamil	P. Pullaiah	Sukumar Productions Limited	
1950	Parijatham	Tamil	K. S. Gopalakrishnan	Lavanya Pictures	S. V. Venkatraman
1950	Swapna Sundari	Telugu	Ghantasala Balaramaiah	Pratibha Productions	Ghantasala
1950	Swapna Sundari	Tamil	Ghantasala Balaramaiah	Pratibha Productions	Ghantasala
1950	Vijayakumari	Tamil	A. S. A. Sami	Jupiter Pictures	
1951	Manamagal	Tamil	N. S. Krishnan	N. S. K. Films	
1951	Pelli Kuthuru	Telugu	T. S. Balaiah, Lalitha, Padmini, S. V. Sahasranamam	N. S. K. Films	
1951	Marmayogi	Tamil	K. Ramnoth	Jupiter Pictures	S. M. Subbaiah Naidu
1951	Navvithe Navaratnalu	Telugu	S. Soundararajan	Tamil Nadu Talkies	
1951	Rupavathi	Telugu	K. Prabhakar Rao	Swathi Films	
1951	Sthree Sahasam	Tamil	Vedantam Raghavayya	Vinodha Pictures	
1951	Stree Sahasam	Telugu	Vedantam Raghavayya	Vinodha Pictures	
1951	Vanasundari	Tamil	T. R. Raghunath	Krishna Pictures	S. V. Venkatraman
1952	Daasi	Telugu	C. V. Ranganatha Das	Rajyam Pictures	S. Dakshinamurthi
1952	Dharma Devatha	Telugu	P. Pullaiah	Ragini Films	
1952	Dharma Devathai	Tamil	P. Pullaiah	Ragini Films	
1952	Kaadhal	Tamil	P. S. Ramakrishna Rao	Bharani Pictures	
1952	Prema	Telugu	P. S. Ramakrishna Rao	Bharani Pictures	
1952	Santhi	Telugu	Vedantam Raghavayya	Vinoda Pictures	
1952	Rani	Hindi	L. V. Prasad	Jupiter Pictures	D. C. Dutt
1952	Rani	Tamil	L. V. Prasad	Jupiter Pictures	D. C. Dutt
1953	Velaikari Magal	Tamil	C. V. Ranganatha Das	Rajyam Pictures	S. Dakshinamurthi
1953	Ammalakkalu	Telugu	D. Yoganand	Krishna Pictures	Viswanathan–Ramamoorthy
1953	Marumagal	Tamil	D. Yoganand	Krishna Pictures	Viswanathan–Ramamoorthy
1953	Bratuku Teruvu	Telugu	P. S. Ramakrishna Rao	Bhaskar Productions	Ghantasala
1953	Chandirani	Tamil	P. Bhanumathi	Bharani Pictures	M. S. Viswanathan
1953	Chandirani	Telugu	P. Bhanumathi	Bharani Pictures	M. S. Viswanathan
1953	Chandirani	Hindi	P. Bhanumathi	Bharani Pictures	M. S. Viswanathan
1953	Devadasu	Telugu	Vedantam Raghavayya	Vinodha Pictures	Viswanathan–Ramamoorthy
1953	Devadas	Tamil	Vedantam Raghavayya	Vinoda Pictures	Viswanathan–Ramamoorthy

=== Playback Singer ===
Year	Film	Language	Song	Co-singer	Music
1948	Mohini	Tamil	Vasantha Maalai Neram	T. V. Rathnam	S. M. Subbaiah Naidu & C. R. Subburaman
1950	Sri Lakshmamma Katha	Telugu	Annem Punnem Yerugani		C. R. Subburaman
1950	Parijatham	Tamil	Ezhai En Meethu Paaraa		C. R. Subburaman
1950	Parijatham	Tamil	Mathiyaa Vithiyaa	T. V. Rathnam	C. R. Subburaman
1951	Manamagal	Tamil	Iru Kaadhalar Magizhndhe	M. L. Vasanthakumari	C. R. Subburaman
1951	Pelli Kuthuru	Telugu	Kanne Chilaka Yegiripodhu	M. L. Vasanthakumari	C. R. Subburaman
1951	Pelli Kuthuru	Telugu	Papulao Kadu Papi Anevadu	M. L. Vasanthakumari	C. R. Subburaman
1951	Pelli Kuthuru	Telugu	Virajajula Valapu Vayyari	M. L. Vasanthakumari	C. R. Subburaman
1952	Rani	Tamil	Maamalar Thoovida	Jikki	C. R. Subburaman & D. C. Dutt
1952	Rani	Tamil	Poraadum Vanmai	S. Balachander & Jikki	C. R. Subburaman & D. C. Dutt
1952	Rani	Tamil	Ulle Onnu Veliye Onnu	Thiruchi Loganathan & P. Susheela	C. R. Subburaman & D. C. Dutt
1952	Rani	Tamil	Samarasam Nilaiperum	P. Bhanumathi	C. R. Subburaman & D. C. Dutt
1952	Dharma Devathai	Tamil	Vaaraayi Thaaraayi Neeye Raani	Jikki	C. R. Subburaman
1952	Dharma Devathai	Tamil	Vaaraamale Irundhiduvaano	K. Rani	C. R. Subburaman
1953	Marumagal	Tamil	Laali Suba Laali	P. A. Periyanayaki	C. R. Subburaman
1953	Chandirani	Tamil	Anbaai Dhesamenggum Ondraai Koodi	P. Susheela	C. R. Subburaman

=== Film producer ===
Under Vinoda Pictures

Year	Film	Language	Cast	Co-Music Director
1951	Stree Sahasam	Tamil	A. Nageswara Rao, Anjali Devi	
1951	Stree Sahasam	Telugu	A. Nageswara Rao, Anjali Devi	
1952	Santhi	Telugu		
1953	Devadasu	Telugu	A. Nageswara Rao, Savithri, Lalitha	M. S. Viswanathan & T. K. Ramamoorthy
1953	Devadas	Tamil	A. Nageswara Rao, Savithri, Lalitha	M. S. Viswanathan & T. K. Ramamoorthy
