= Kaveriyin Kanavan =

1959 Tamil film

- Theatrical release poster
- Directed by: A. K. Velan
- Screenplay by: A. K. Velan
- Produced by: A. K. Velan
- Starring: Valayapathi G. Muthukrishnan; Sowcar Janaki; Pakkirisamy; Suryakala
- Cinematography: V. Ramamurthi
- Edited by: V. B. Natarajan
- Music by: K. V. Mahadevan
- Production company: Arunachalam Studios
- Distributed by: Arunachalam Pictures Circuit
- Release date: 27 September 1959
- Running time: 155 minutes
- Country: India
- Language: Tamil

Kaveriyin Kanavan (transl. Kaveri's Husband) is a 1959 Indian Tamil-language drama film directed by A. K. Velan. The film stars Valayapathi G. Muthukrishnan and Sowcar Janaki. It was released on 27 September 1959.

== Plot ==
There are two love stories. When Kaveri was a child her father visited his friend in Trichy with her. The friend had a young son, Ekambaram. Kaveri and Ekambaram played together but Ekambaram's mother did not like it. However, Ekambaram's father married Ekambaram and Kaveri while they were still children as per the custom of those times. Soon after, Ekambaram went abroad for further studies. When he returned after studies, his mother said Kaveri had died. So he married another girl who dies. Ekambaram then discovers that Kaveri did not really die.

Anandan is Kaveri's brother living in another village. When he heard that his sister fell in a river he is saddened and begins a nomadic lifestyle. He joins a drama troupe. He meets a girl Vasantha and both become lovers. Anandan learns that Vasantha's mother is a woman of loose character. So he mistreats Vasantha. But Vasantha says she is innocent and should not be punished for her mother's faults. How the problems of the two couples are solved forms the rest of the story.

== Cast ==
List adapted from the film's song book

Male cast

- Muthukrishnan
- Pakkirisami
- P. S. Dakshinamurthi
- Karikol Raju
- S. P. Veerasami
- Thangavel
- A. M. Maruthappa
- T. N. Krishnan
- Arjunan
- Rajagopal

Female cast

- Sowcar Janaki
- Suryakala
- C. K. Saraswathi
- Angamuthu
- Komalam
- Parvathi

Dance

- Kusala Kumari

== Production ==
The film was produced and directed by A. K. Velan under his own banner Arunachalam Studios. He also wrote the story and dialogues. V. Ramamurthi handled the cinematography while V. B. Natarajan did the editing. Art direction was by A. B. Muthu. P. S. Gopalakrishnan was in charge of Choreography. Still photography was done by Thiruchi Arunachalam.

== Soundtrack ==
Music was composed by K. V. Mahadevan. The song "Maappillai Vandhaar" was a hit.

Song	Singer/s	Lyricist
"Vanna Thamizh Sornakili"	M. L. Vasanthakumari	Udumalai Narayana Kavi
"Chinna Chinna Nadai Nadandhu"	P. Susheela	P. K. Muthuswami
"Chinna Chinna Nadai Nadandhu" (pathos)	P. Susheela	P. K. Muthuswami
"Kanni Vayadhu Ilam Paruvathile"	P. Susheela	P. K. Muthuswami
"Thanjavur Bommai Pole"	Thiruchi Loganathan	Thanjai N. Ramaiah Dass
"Kannathile Vizhum Pallathile...Velli Anname Vaaraayo"	Thiruchi Loganathan	Thanjai N. Ramaiah Dass
"Parandhu Vandha Paingkiliye"	Thiruchi Loganathan	Thanjai N. Ramaiah Dass
"Alai Modhuthe Nenjam"	Thiruchi Loganathan & K. Jamuna Rani	Thanjai N. Ramaiah Dass
"Maappillai Vandhaan"	M. S. Rajeswari & L. R. Eswari	Thanjai N. Ramaiah Dass
"Maappillai Vandhaan" (pathos)	M. S. Rajeswari	Thanjai N. Ramaiah Dass
