= Laila Majnu (1949 film) =

- Theatrical release poster
- Directed by: P. S. Ramakrishna Rao
- Written by: Samudrala Sr (story / dialogues)
- Screenplay by: P. S. Ramakrishna Rao
- Based on: Sufi's Laila-Majnu
- Produced by: P. S. Ramakrishna Rao; Bhanumathi (presents)
- Starring: Akkineni Nageswara Rao; Bhanumathi
- Cinematography: B. S. Ranga
- Edited by: P. S. Ramakrishna Rao
- Music by: C. R. Subburaman
- Production company: Bharani Pictures
- Release date: 1 October 1949
- Running time: 169 minutes
- Country: India
- Language: Telugu

Laila Majnu is a 1949 Telugu-language historical romance film, based on the Sufi legend of Laila-Majnu. It is produced and directed by P. S. Ramakrishna Rao under the Bharani Pictures banner. It stars Akkineni Nageswara Rao and Bhanumathi, with music composed by C. R. Subburaman. The film was simultaneously dubbed and released in Tamil with same title. The film was successful at the box office.

== Cast ==
Cast according to the opening credits of the film:

- Nageswara Rao as Khayas (Majnu)
- Bhanumathi as Laila

Male cast

- C. S. R. as Rakkin Prabhu
- Siva Rao as Anwar
- Krishnamurthy as Amir Sarvar
- Aarani as Amir Zamri
- Seetharam as Moulvi
- K. V. Subba Rao as Kubla Khan
- Chitti Babu as Young Khayas
- Dumbachari as Raheem

Female cast

- Sriranjani (Junior) as Zarina
- Hemalatha as Begum
- Surabhi Balasaraswathi as Zohrah
- Baby Krishnaveni as Young Laila
- Vimala Devi as Zuguna
- Annapoorna Devi as Moulvi's Wife

Dance

- Lalitha-Padmini (Travancore Sisters)

== Production ==
With his first film, Rathnamala, turning a box office hit, studio owner and director Ramakrishna was on the lookout for a suitable subject for Bharani's next venture. Fascinated by the first Hindi talkie version of Laila Majnu (1945), which he had seen in Bombay, he made the choice. His production chief D. L. Narayana agreed with him. A screening of the Hindi version was arranged for his actress-wife Bhanumathi and Akkineni Nageswara Rao, whom he had thought of for the protagonist's role. Samudrala Raghavacharya was assigned the job of writing the script and the dialogue.

The sandstorm scene especially is worth mentioning. Instead of veteran cameraman Jiten Banerjee, who cranked for Rathnamala, Ramakrishna took B. S. Ranga as the cameraman without even knowing how efficient his work was. Ranga who bagged this assignment thanks to his brother Garudachari, a close friend of Ramakrishna, proved his worth and it was the turning point in his future life and career. Besides excellent photography, sound designing (by V. Srinivasa Raghavan under whom later day's popular director K. Viswanath worked as an assistant), the period sets created by art directors Goadgoankar and K. Nageswara Rao.

Vedantam Raghavayya choreographed the songs. Samudrala Sr gave the story, dialogue, and lyrics. Cinematography is performed by B. S. Ranga. The film is presented by P. Bhanumathi under Bharani Pictures.

== Soundtrack ==
Laila Majnu

Film score by C. R. Subburaman
- Released: 1949
- Genre: Soundtrack
- Length: 47:25
- Producer: C. R. Subburaman

Music composed by C. R. Subburaman. All the tunes for all the songs and singers for both languages are the same. Singers are P. Bhanumathi & Kasturi Siva Rao. Playback singers are Ghantasala, S. Dakshinamurthi, Madhavapeddi Satyam R. Balasaraswathi Devi, P. Leela & Jikki.

Music released on AVM Audio Company.

=== Telugu songs ===
Lyrics by Samudrala Sr. The song "Preme Neramouna" is an evergreen blockbuster.

S. no.	Song title	Singers	length
1	"Neevene Naa Chaduvu"	Ghantasala, Bhanumathi Ramakrishna, P. Leela, Jikki	3:00
2	"Aaha Pahliyanchega"	Bhanumathi Ramakrishna	2:07
3	"Viritavula Lona"	Ghantasala, Bhanumathi Ramakrishna	3:08
4	"Cherararo"	Ghantasala, Bhanumathi Ramakrishna	2:30
5	"Raavo Naanu Marachitivo"	Ghantasala, Bhanumathi Ramakrishna	2:44
6	"Ninu Basi Povudana"	Bhanumathi Ramakrishna	3:10
7	"Preme Neramounaa"	Bhanumathi Ramakrishna	2:57
8	"Chelunigani Nijamidani"	Ghantasala, Bhanumathi Ramakrishna	4:08
9	"Payanamye Priyathama"	Ghantasala	2:55
10	"Ela Pagaye"	R. Balasaraswathi Devi	2:16
11	"Ninugani Manasuna"	P. Leela	2:14
12	"Assaalaa Malekkum"	Kasturi Siva Rao	2:47
13	"Manasu Gadaa Khudaa"	Ghantasala, Susarla Dakshinamurthy, Madhavapeddi Satyam	4:30
14	"Andala Chinnadana"	P. Leela, K. Jamuna Rani	2:43
15	"Eenaati Mapata"	P. Leela, Jikki	2:21
16	"Tanedano"	Bhanumathi Ramakrishna	0:59
17	"Neeve Nenaa Chaduvu"	Ghantasala	2:56

=== Tamil songs ===
Lyrics by S. D. Sundharam.

S. no.	Song title	Singers	Lyrics	length
1	"Nee Thaane Ennaasai"	Ghantasala, P. Bhanumathi, P. Leela & Jikki	S. D. Sundharam	3:00
2	"Aaha Palan Vandhadhe"	P. Bhanumathi	S. D. Sundharam	2:07
3	"Iga Vaazhvinil Kaadhal Mahaajothiye"	Ghantasala & P. Bhanumathi	S. D. Sundharam	3:08
4	"Jothi Minnum"	Ghantasala & P. Bhanumathi	S. D. Sundharam	2:30
5	"Vaaraayo Enai Marandhanaiyo"	Ghantasala & P. Bhanumathi	S. D. Sundharam	2:44
6	"Unnai Paarkka Pogirenaa"	P. Bhanumathi	S. D. Sundharam	3:10
7	"Premaithaan Polladhaa"	P. Bhanumathi	S. D. Sundharam	2:57
8	"Enadhu Uyir Urugum Nilai"	Ghantasala & P. Bhanumathi	S. D. Sundharam	4:08
9	"Parandhu Sellum Paingkiiiye"	Ghantasala	S. D. Sundharam	2:55
10	"Veen Pazhi Thaane Prabho"	R. Balasaraswathi Devi	S. D. Sundharam	2:16
11	"Oru Ooril Oru Raajaa"	P. Leela	S. D. Sundharam	2:14
12	"Assaalaa Malekkum"	Kasturi Siva Rao	S. D. Sundharam	2:47
13	"Maghimaiyodu Sadhaa Ezhai"	Ghantasala, S. Dakshinamurthi & Madhavapeddi Satyam	S. D. Sundharam	4:30
14	"Kuliridhe Suvai Madhu"	P. Leela & Jikki	S. D. Sundharam	2:43
15	"Kannaadi Kanni Neeye"	P. Leela & Jikki	S. D. Sundharam	2:21
16	" "	P. Bhanumathi	S. D. Sundharam	0:59
17	"Nee Thaane Ennaasai"	Ghantasala	S. D. Sundharam	2:56

== Release ==
The film was dubbed into Tamil and released simultaneously with the Telugu version. S. D. Sundharam wrote the dialogues and lyrics for the Tamil version. F. Nagoor made another Laila Majnu in 1950 under the banner Balaji Pictures and shot at Newtone studios with T. R. Mahalingam and M. V. Rajamma . The story was again made in 1953, 1976 (in Hindi and Bengali), and later in 1982.

== Critical reception ==
An article published in the Hindu wrote about this movie, "While the opulent palace, garden and other sets were put up in the floor, the desert set with a pond, palm trees (to resemble date trees found in deserts) and sand dunes were created in the open space between the studio and the recording theatre and the scenes were shot there during the nights for the right effect. The result of this entire effort was reflected in audience's appreciation of the movie."
