= Rani (1952 film) =

- Theatrical release poster
- Directed by: L. V. Prasad
- Screenplay by: A. S. A. Sami
- Based on: The Loves of Carmen (1948)
- Produced by: M. Somasundaram
- Starring: P. Bhanumathi; S. Balachander
- Cinematography: W. R. Subba Rao
- Edited by: M. A. Thirumugam
- Music by: C. R. Subburaman; D. C. Dutt
- Production company: Jupiter Pictures
- Release date: 26 April 1952
- Country: India
- Languages: Tamil; Hindi

Rani (transl. Queen) is a 1952 Indian film directed by L. V. Prasad, written by A. S. A. Sami and produced by Jupiter Pictures. The film, a Tamil-Hindi bilingual, stars P. Bhanumathi, S. Balachander in the Tamil version with Anoop Kumar replacing him in Hindi. Based on the 1948 American film The Loves of Carmen, it was released on 26 April 1952.

== Plot ==
A little princess named Ranjani is tattooed with the royal insignia as part of tradition, and on the same night, she is kidnapped by one of the members of the tattoo gang who brings her up as a gypsy girl renaming her Rani. Unaware of her royal lineage, she grows up hawking things on the street and getting into brawls with no punches pulled. She falls in love with a soldier and the story progresses with twists. After several hardships, she learns the truth and the story ends well for her.

== Cast ==
- P. Bhanumathi as Rani/Ranjani
- S. Balachander (Tamil)
- Anoop Kumar (Hindi)
- S. V. Subbaiah
- M. Saroja
- Wahab Kashmiri
- M. K. Mustafa
- G. M. Basheer
- M. S. S. Bhagyam
- Lakshmiprabha
- C. S. D. Singh
- M. R. Santhanam
- K. S. Angamuthu
- Baby Sachu as Ranjani

== Production ==
Rani, based on the 1948 American film The Loves of Carmen, was shot partly at Central Studios, Coimbatore, which Jupiter Pictures had taken on lease, and also at Neptune Studios, Madras. Over the course of production, there were numerous ego clashes that developed among the cast and crew. The film was simultaneously produced in Hindi. Screenwriter A. S. A. Sami was the initial director, but replaced by L. V. Prasad.

== Soundtrack ==
Music was composed by C. R. Subburaman assisted by D. C. Dutt who conducted the orchestra.

Song	Singer/s	Lyricist	Duration (m:ss)
"Maamalar Thoovida"	C. R. Subburaman, Jikki & group	Ku. Sa. Krishnamurthy	
"Poraadum Vanmai"	C. R. Subburaman, S. Balachander, Jikki & group	Ku. Sa. Krishnamurthy	
"Neela Kangalai"	D. C. Dutt, Jikki & group	K. D. Santhanam	
"Ulle Onnu Veliye Onnu"	C. R. Subburaman, Thiruchi Loganathan, P. Susheela & group	K. D. Santhanam	
"Needhiyillaa Ulagile"	D. C. Dutt & T. A. Mothi	K. D. Santhanam	
"Ini Endrum Inbam Thaan"	D. C. Dutt, Jikki & group	K. D. Santhanam	
"Thalo Thale Thalo"	Jikki	K. D. Santhanam	03:04
"Naane Gnaaniyar"	P. Bhanumathi	K. D. Santhanam	
"Madhi Mayangum Malar Vanam"	P. Bhanumathi	K. D. Santhanam	
"Karugi Pugaiyum Pugaiye"	P. Bhanumathi	T. K. Sundara Vathiyar	
"Unmaiyillaadha Ulagile"	P. Bhanumathi	T. K. Sundara Vathiyar	
"Samayam Vaachchadhu"	P. Bhanumathi	T. K. Sundara Vathiyar	
"Cheeppu Chunukkani Chimini"	P. Bhanumathi	Udumalai Narayana Kavi	
"Samarasam Nilaiperum"	C. R. Subburaman, P. Bhanumathi & group	Udumalai Narayana Kavi	

== Reception ==
Film historian Randor Guy wrote, "Bhanumathi excelled in the title role. Balachandar, slim and handsome, was somewhat miscast, and the romantic sequences between them raised laughs! Despite the impressive cast and pleasing music, Rani flopped in both languages".
