= Valliyin Selvan =

- Theatrical release poster
- Directed by: Kothamangalam Subbu
- Written by: Kothamangalam Subbu
- Starring: S. V. Subbaiah; M. S. Sundari Bai
- Cinematography: C. A. S. Mani
- Edited by: N. R. Krishnaswamy
- Music by: P. S. Anantharaman
- Production company: United Film Arts
- Distributed by: Gemini Studios
- Release date: 11 February 1955
- Country: India
- Language: Tamil

Valliyin Selvan (transl. Valli's son) is a 1955 Indian Tamil-language children's film written and directed by Kothamangalam Subbu. The film stars Lalitha, Sahasranamam, M. S. Sundari Bai and S. V. Subbaiah. It was released on 11 February 1955.

== Plot ==
A rich man is childless and wants to remarry. His wife is worried. Their household servant gives his infant son to the lady who convinces the rich man that the baby was born to her. The lady's brother knows the truth. The servant's wife dies and after some time the lady conceives and gives birth to a son. She starts neglecting and ill-treating the servant's son. So the servant tries to take away his son. However, the rich man, who is not aware of the truth, thinks the servant is trying to abduct the eldest boy and beats the servant. The elder boy learns that he is the son of the servant and goes away to live with his real father. The younger boy becomes very ill. The doctor who examines him says he is affected by the loss of his elder brother and he can be cured only if the elder boy returns home. The lady, mistaking her husband for her brother, tells him what is needed to cure her biological son. Thus, the rich man learns the truth. The rich man begs the servant to give him his son. The servant initially objects but due to the plight of the younger boy, sends his son to the rich man.

== Cast ==
- Lalitha as Vathsala
- Sahasranamam as Manoharam Pillay
- Sundari Bai as Valli
- S. V. Subbaiah as Kandan
- Vanaja as Leela
- R. Ganesan as Murthy
- T. S. Durairaj as Sheristadar Doraiswamy Pillay
- P. S. Gnanam as Manoharam Pillay's sister
- Master Murali as Raju
- Master Babuji as Balu

== Production ==
The film was produced by United Film Arts, a subsidiary company of Gemini Studios.

== Soundtrack ==
Music was composed by P. S. Anantharaman and lyrics were penned by Kothamangalam Subbu.

Song	Singers	Length
"Kannin Maniye Vaa"	M. L. Vasanthakumari	02:32
"Jigu Jigu Engeyum Nikkaadhu Rayil"	Children song	04:25
"Nadanam Aadinaar"	Seergazhi Govindarajan	01:51
"Kannaa Unnai Kandadhum"	Thiruchi Loganathan	01:56
"Mangalam Endra.... En Arumai Selvame" (Title song)	Radha Jayalakshmi	02:18
"Vilayaadum Dheivamadi"	M. L. Vasanthakumari & T. V. Rathnam	06:09
"Aayirangaalatthu Payiraai"	T. V. Rathnam	02:37
"Nallavar Endre.... Putthira Vaanjaiyil"	Seergazhi Govindarajan	02:35
"Panjayaththukku Vaa Pulle"	T. M. Soundararajan & T. V. Rathnam	02:59
"Anbe Uruvaai Aanavar"	V. N. Sundaram & group	00:23
"Un Mugam Vaada Kandaal"		
