= Stree Sahasam =

- Theatrical release poster
- Directed by: Vedantam Raghavayya
- Written by: Samudrala Sr (dialogues)
- Produced by: Vedantam Raghavayya
- Starring: Akkineni Nageswara Rao; Anjali Devi
- Cinematography: B. S. Ranga
- Edited by: P. V. Narayana
- Music by: C. R. Subburaman
- Production company: Vinoda Pictures
- Distributed by: Poorna Films
- Release date: 9 August 1951
- Country: India
- Language: Telugu

Stree Sahasam (Telugu: స్త్రీ సాహసము transl. Women's Adventure) is a 1951 Indian Telugu-language swashbuckler film, produced and directed by Vedantam Raghavayya under the Vinoda Pictures banner. It stars Akkineni Nageswara Rao and Anjali Devi, with music composed by C. R. Subburaman.

== Cast ==
- Akkineni Nageswara Rao as Raja Sekara
- Anjali Devi as Manohari
- CSR Anjaneyulu as Mahavira Maharaju
- Relangi as Ammanna
- Kasturi Siva Rao
- Rama Murthy
- Seetharam
- Sadasiva Rao
- Girija as Komali
- Surya Prabha as Rani
- Annapurna
- Vijaya Lakshmi

== Soundtrack ==
The music was composed by C. R. Subburaman. Lyrics were written by Samudrala Sr.

Song title	Singers	length
"Aalinchave Palinchave"	P. Leela	2:55
"Andaala Raja"	Jikki & S. Dakshinamurthi	3:23
"Jaanatanamunanu Nanemunanu"	Jikki	3:07
"Kalalaku Ranulu"	P. Leela	2:25
"Kaluvala"		2:26
"Nallamalaa Yellamala"	Jikki	3:21
"Oogaraa Rathanala Papa"	P. Leela	3:08
"Siri Siri Hayi"	Jikki	3:29
"Vidhiye Pagaye"	Jikki & S. Dakshinamurthi	3:48
"Idhe Idhe Anandha Midhe"		
"Ee Vanka Aa Vanka"		
"Oohu Hu Oohu"		
"Okate Sunna Jeeva"		
"O Maarajullara"		
"Tingu Rangayya"		
"Lalanamani O Ramania"		
