= Dharma Devatha =

1952 film

- Theatrical release poster in Tamil
- Directed by: P. Pullaiah
- Written by: Thanjai N. Ramaiah Dass; Gopichand (Telugu dialogues)
- Story by: K. V. Reddy
- Produced by: P. Pullaiah
- Starring: Santha Kumari; Kaushik
- Music by: C. R. Subburaman
- Production company: Ragini Films
- Distributed by: Narayanan Company
- Release date: 28 June 1952
- Running time: 193 minutes
- Country: India
- Languages: Tamil; Telugu

Dharma Devatha (transl. Righteous Angel) is a 1952 Indian produced and directed by P. Pullaiah and simultaneously shot in Tamil and Telugu languages. The film stars Santha Kumari and Kaushik, with Mudigonda Lingamurthy, Mukkamala, Relangi, Baby Saraswathi and Girija in supporting roles. The film was released on 28 June 1952.

== Cast ==
Male cast

- Mudigonda Lingamurthy as King Veerasena
- Mukkamala as Raghunatha Varma
- B. N. R. as Sanjeevi
- Kaushik as Soorasenan
- Relangi as Ranganna
- Ramamurthy as Ekadhanthan
- C. V. V. Panthulu as Jayarama Varma
- Duraiswami as Sarvadhikari
- Master Mohan as Gopala Varma

Female cast

- Santha Kumari as Nandini
- Lalitha as Bijlee
- Girija as Vasanthi
- Lakshmiprabha as Rambha
- Padmini as Narthaki
- Baby Saraswathi as Swarna

== Production ==
The film was produced by P. Pullaiah who also directed it under the banner of Ragini Films, which was owned by him. The choreography was co-performed by Pasumarthi Krishnamurthy, Lalitha and Padmini. The film was produced in Tamil and Telugu with the same title.

== Soundtrack ==
The music for Dharma Devatha was composed by C. R. Subburaman. All the tunes for both languages are the same.

Telugu track list

For Telugu version Gopichand wrote dialogues, lyrics were written by Samudrala Sr. and Gopalaraya Sarma. There are 11 songs in the film, of which Santha Kumari sang one herself.

Song	Singer/s	Lyrics	Duration
"Lambaadi Lambaadi.... O Thagidi Baava"	K. Rani		03:03
"Sukhamu Chilikinchu Aanandakiraname"	N. Lalitha		02:47
"Pataku Pallavi"	K. Rani		02:44
"Meevantidenandi Ma Kanne Papa"	P. Santhakumari	Samudrala Sr.	03:16
"Valachi Pilucunoyi Vayyari"			
"Chinduleyavoyi Chinna Krishnayya"	B. N. Rao, N. Lalitha & Jikki	Samudrala Sr.	03:22
"Virise Vennelalo"	Relangi, K. Prasada Rao, Jikki & K. Rani	Samudrala Sr.	03:01
"Hayi Vasantamu Kada"	K. Prasada Rao & Jikki		03:16
"Ide Kalalu Nijamaaye Manasu"			
"Chilipī Paaṭalaku Chikilī Maatalaku"			
"Tholichoopulu Manasulaage"	Jikki		
"Bantipula Rangayo Nikinta"	Relangi		
"Raavo Rani Haayi Reyi'"	K. Prasada Rao & Jikki		
"Raave Vasantamukaga Nede"	K. Prasada Rao & K. Rani		
"E Oore Chinnadaana"	K. Prasada Rao & K. Rani		03:24
"Premaa Vanilona Reraanivi Gaavaa"			

Tamil tracklist

The lyrics for the Tamil songs were penned by Thanjai N. Ramaiah Dass, who also wrote the film's dialogues with Aluri Chakrapani.

Song	Singer/s	Duration
Lambaadi Lambaadi.... Thalukku Kaatti Kulukki	K. Rani	03:03
Aananda Leelai Tharum	N. Lalitha	02:47
Paaduven Paarungko	K. Rani	03:21
Aaraaro Aariraro	T. S. Bhagavathi	03:22
Vidhiye Un Leelai Thaano	T. S. Bhagavathi	02:31
Anbaai Odi Vaadaa	C. R. Subburaman, N. Lalitha & Jikki	03:08
Thaiyathaan Thaan Thimithaan	Relangi & Jikki	03:18
Ahaa Vasanthame	D. B. Ramachandran & Jikki	03:16
Vaazhvil Ninaive Kanavaagume		
Raasaa En Rosaa Poovae		
Anbe Namadhu Ilangkaadhal	Jikki	03:05
Kaettiye Oru Sangadhi	Relangi	
Vaaraai Thaaraa Neeye Raani	C. R. Subburaman & Jikki	03:01
Vaaraamale Irundhiduvaano	C. R. Subburaman & K. Rani	
Joraana Minnal Polae	D. B. Ramachandran & K. Rani	02:52

== Reception ==
Film historian Randor Guy noted that the film had better box office success in Telugu than in Tamil.
