= Ammalakkalu =

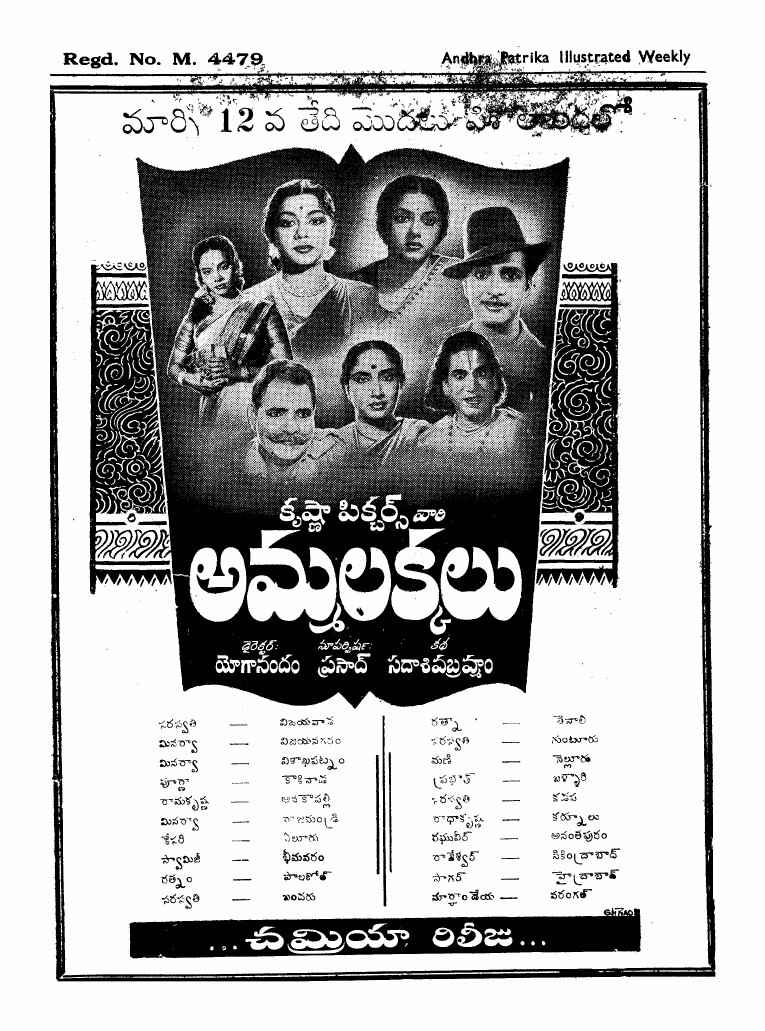
- Release poster in Telugu
- Directed by: D. Yoganand
- Screenplay by: Vempati Sadasivabrahmam (Telugu); A. S. A. Sami (Tamil)
- Story by: Vempati Sadasivabrahmam
- Produced by: Lena Chettiar
- Starring: N. T. Rama Rao; Padmini; Lalitha
- Cinematography: Bomman Irani
- Edited by: V. B. Nataraja Modaliyar
- Music by: Songs: C. R. Subburaman; G. Ramanathan; Score: Viswanathan–Ramamoorthy
- Production company: Krishna Pictures
- Release dates: 12 March 1953 (Telugu); 14 April 1953 (Tamil)
- Running time: 187 minutes (Telugu); 177 minutes (Tamil)
- Country: India
- Languages: Telugu; Tamil

Ammalakkalu (transl. Mothers and Sisters) is a 1953 Indian Telugu-language drama film that was produced by Lena Chettiar on Krishna Pictures banner and directed by D. Yoganand. The film stars N. T. Rama Rao, Padmini and Lalitha, with music composed by C. R. Subburaman. It was simultaneously shot in Tamil as Marumagal (transl. Daughter-in-law). The Tamil version was released on 14 April 1953.

== Cast ==
Tamil poster

- N. T. Rama Rao as Kumar
- Padmini as Usha
- Lalitha as Shanta
- Surabhi Balasaraswathi as Rupa

Telugu version

- Relangi as Riyo
- Amarnath as Sundar
- Dr. Sivaramakrishnaiah as Achchaiah
- B. R. Panthulu as Ramaiah
- D. Balasubramaniam as Kishtaiah
- Suryakantham as Seshamma
- Rushyendramani as Sugunamma
- Surabhi Kamalabai as Parvathi

Tamil version

- S. V. Sahasranamam as Durai
- T. R. Ramachandran as Suri
- B. R. Panthulu as Ramasamy
- D. Balasubramaniam as Krishnaswamy
- V. K. Ramasamy as Subedhar
- Kallapart Natarajan
- "Master" Sudhakar as young Kumar
- C. T. Rajakantham as Gunalakshmi
- K. S. Angamuthu as Nallamma
- M. Saroja as Thara
- M. Lakshmiprabha as Doctor Kasturi
- S. D. Subbulakshmi as Rajamma
- Indra Acharya as Doctor Kamala
- K. S. Adhilakshmi as wife of Subedhar
- V. Suryakantham as Thangamma
- Baby Saraswathi young Usha

Dance

- Ragini
- Padmini
- Kusalakumari

== Soundtrack ==
The music was composed by C. R. Subburaman with background music to be completed later by Viswanathan–Ramamoorthy and party after the untimely death of C. R. Subburaman. T. K. Ramamoorthy acted as his assistant in several films and was asked by the producer to complete the music for the film. Tunes for both languages are the same.

However, there was one song in the film, "Undaloi Undaloi"/"Aanukkoru Penn Pillai," that was composed by G. Ramanathan.

Telugu soundtrack

Song	Singers	Length
"Penugonu Manasula"	A. M. Rajah & P. A. Periyanayaki	03:27
"Kannemaavi Thotalona"	Jikki & A. P. Komala	02:45
"Kannemaavi Thotalona"	A. M. Rajah & P. A. Periyanayaki	03:56
"Nee Kosam"	Pithapuram Nageswara Rao & M. L. Vasanthakumari	03:51
"Oo Neeve Naa Prema"	A. M. Rajah & P. A. Periyanayaki	02:27
"Undaloi Undaloi"	P. A. Periyanayaki & A. P. Komala	11:10
"Maaradavela Maaramu"	A. M. Rajah & P. A. Periyanayaki	03:48
"Rupaa Rupante"	Pithapuram Nageswara Rao & A. P. Komala	02:18
"Lallaa Lallaa"	Pithapuram Nageswara Rao & R. Balasaraswathi Devi	03:01
"Jhan Jhan Jhan"	A. P. Komala	00:26

Tamil soundtrack

Song	Singers	Lyrics	Length (m:ss)
"Kanavilum Nanavilum Inai Piriyaadha"	A. M. Rajah & P. A. Periyanayaki	Udumalai Narayana Kavi	03:31
"Chinna Chinna Veedu Katti"	Jikki & A. P. Komala	Udumalai Narayana Kavi	03:50
"Chinna Chinna Veedu Katti"	A. M. Rajah & P. A. Periyanayaki	Udumalai Narayana Kavi	03:18
"Nianikkira Maaadhiri Ellaam"	T. R. Ramachandran & M. L. Vasanthakumari	Udumalai Narayana Kavi	03:51
"Oo Neethaan En Sondham"	A. M. Rajah & P. A. Periyanayaki	Udumalai Narayana Kavi	03:01
"Aanukkoru Penn Pillai"	P. A. Periyanayaki, A. P. Komala & A. G. Rathnamala	Udumalai Narayana Kavi	12:15
"Pesaadha Maounam Aamo"	A. M. Rajah & P. A. Periyanayaki	Udumalai Narayana Kavi	04:23
"Romaani Maambazham Roobamthaan"	T. R. Ramachandran & A. P. Komala	Udumalai Narayana Kavi	02:15
"Laali Suba Laali"	C. R. Subburaman & P. A. Periyanayaki	Udumalai Narayana Kavi	03:05
"Jal Jal Jal Kingkini Aada"	A. P. Komala	K. D. Santhanam	

== Reception ==
Reviewing Ammalakkalu, a critic from Zamin Ryot wrote that the story is not smooth, and turns into an unprofitable whorehouse with seams. The film fared well at the box office in both languages, but Ammalakkalu was more successful. In Ammalakkalu, the duet song sung by Relangi became popular in Telugu districts of the then-Madras State. Ammalakkalu became popular through theatrical re-runs.
