= Kusalakumari =

Indian actress and dancer (1937–2019)

Thanjavur Damayanthi Kusalakumari (6 December 1937 - 7 March 2019) was an Indian actress and dancer. She featured in Tamil, Telugu and Malayalam language films.

== Early life ==
Born in Thanjavur, Kusalakumari was a niece of T. R. Rajakumari. Her birth name was Kusalambal. Being born in an artistes family, she began learning Bharata Natyam at the age of 3. When she was 5 years old, the family moved to Chennai. She used to accompany her aunt T. R. Rajakumari, for shooting of films.

== Film career ==
Kusalakumari began her film career as a child artiste. Though she had danced in films before, she got a character role in Avvaiyar as the child Avvaiyar. Her major role as the poor woman falling in love with Sivaji Ganesan, was in Koondukili, the only film Sivaji Ganesan and M. G. Ramachandran featured together in. Later she acted as the younger sister of Sivaji Ganesan in Kalvanin Kadhali, and then as the younger sister of K. R. Ramasamy in Needhipathi.

The competition dance with Kumari Kamala in Konjum Salangai brought fame to her as a dancer.

She began her film career in Telugu with Raju Peda as a dancer. The film featured N. T. Rama Rao in the main role and was a success. After that, she starred in many Telugu films both as dancer and in character roles.

She was paired with Prem Nazir in Malayalam-language film Seeta in the title role. The film ran for more than 200 days. Another Malayalam film Mariakutty won the President's award.

== Awards ==
- Kalaimamani
- Kalai Chelvam

== Later life ==
Kusalakumari did not marry. She lived with her brother T. D. Sekar in Chennai. The then Chief minister of Tamil Nadu J. Jayalalithaa learned of Kusalakumari's financial difficulties and sanctioned a monthly allowance of Rs.5000.

== Death ==
Kusalakumari died of old age (83) on 7 March 2019 in Chennai.

== Filmography ==
Year	Title	Role	Language	Notes
1944	Mahamaya	Child Bala	Tamil	Debut (Baby Kusalambal)
1948	Chandralekha	Dancer	Tamil	
1949	Krishna Bakthi	Child dancer	Tamil	
1950	Laila Majnu	Young Laila	Tamil	
1951	Manamagal		Tamil	
1951	Pelli Koothuru		Telugu	
1952	Parasakthi	Dancer	Tamil	
1952	Kalyanam Panniyum Brahmachari	Dancer	Tamil	
1953	Avvaiyar	Child Avvaiyar	Tamil	
1953	Marumagal	Dancer	Tamil	
1953	Ammalakkalu	Dancer	Telugu	
1953	Devadasu	Dancer	Telugu	
1954	Koondukkili	Sokki	Tamil	
1954	Bedara Kannappa		Kannada	
1954	Vedan Kannappa		Tamil	
1954	Nanban		Tamil	
1954	Pona Machaan Thirumbi Vandhan	Chandra	Tamil	
1954	Ratha Kanneer	Dancer	Tamil	
1954	Raju Peda	Dancer	Telugu	
1954	Kalahasti Mahatyam		Telugu	
1954	Sorgavasal	Dancer	Tamil	
1955	Jayasimha	Dancer	Telugu	
1955	Donga Ramudu	Dancer	Telugu	
1955	Kalvanin Kadhali	Abirami	Tamil	
1955	Kaveri	Dancer	Tamil	
1955	Menaka	Dancer	Tamil	
1955	Jayasimman	Dancer	Tamil	
1955	Needhipathi		Tamil	
1956	Madurai Veeran	Dancer	Tamil	
1956	Kudumba Vilakku	Dancer	Tamil	
1956	Ilavelpu	Singari	Telugu	
1956	Graha Devatha		Malayalam	
1956	Sahasaveerudu		Telugu	
1957	Aandi Petra Selvan	Dancer	Tamil	
1957	Samaya Sanjeevi		Tamil	
1957	Sati Anasuya	Rati	Telugu	
1957	Panduranga Mahatyam	Dancer	Telugu	
1958	Mangalya Bhagyam		Tamil	
1958	Mariakutty	Betty	Malayalam	
1958	Bhakta Markandeya	Dancer	Telugu	
1958	Kadan Vaangi Kalyanam	Dancer	Tamil	
1959	Kaveriyin Kanavan	Dancer	Tamil	
1959	Mahishasura Mardini		Kannada	
1959	Mahishasura Mardini		Telugu	
1959	Nalla Theerpu		Tamil	
1959	Raja Sevai		Tamil	
1959	Rechukka Pagatichukka		Telugu	
1960	Mahakavi Kalidasu	Dancer	Telugu	
1960	Bhatti Vikramarka	Dancer	Telugu	
1960	Desingu Raja Katha	Dancer	Telugu	
1960	Patti Vikramathithan	Dancer	Tamil	
1960	Raja Desingu	Dancer	Tamil	
1960	Rathinapuri Ilavarasi		Tamil	
1960	Seeta	Sita	Malayalam	
1960	Durga Mata		Hindi	
1961	Bhakta Kuchela		Malayalam	
1961	Bharya Bharthalu		Telugu	
1961	Ennai Paar		Tamil	
1961	Sita Rama Kalyanam	Rambha	Telugu	
1962	Konjum Salangai	Kamavalli	Tamil	
1962	Muripinche Muvvalu		Telugu	
1962	Mahathma Kabir		Kannada	
1963	Lava Kusa	Dancer	Telugu	
1963	Sampoorna Ramayanam	Dancer	Tamil	
1964	Ramudu Bheemudu	Dancer	Telugu	
1964	Rishyasringar		Tamil	
1964	Oral Koodi Kallanayi		Malayalam	
1964	Sree Guruvayoorappan		Malayalam	
1968	Harichandra	Dancer	Tamil	
1969	Thirumal Perumai	Dancer	Tamil	
1972	Kurathi Magan		Tamil	
1976	Manmadha Leelai	Rekha's mother	Tamil	
1977	Meethi Meethi Baatein		Hindi	
1977	Nandha En Nila		Tamil	
