= Sri Lakshmamma Katha =

- Theatrical release poster
- Directed by: Ghantasala Balaramaiah
- Written by: Balijepalli Lakshmikantham; Gopalaraya Sharma (dialogues)
- Produced by: Ghantasala Balaramaiah
- Starring: Akkineni Nageswara Rao; Anjali Devi
- Cinematography: P. Sridhar
- Edited by: G. D. Joshi
- Music by: C. R. Subburaman
- Production company: Pratibha Productions
- Distributed by: Poorna films
- Release date: 26 February 1950
- Country: India
- Language: Telugu

Sri Lakshmamma Katha (transl. The Story of Sri Lakshmamma) is a 1950 Telugu-language film, produced and directed by Ghantasala Balaramayya under the Pratibha Productions banner. It stars Akkineni Nageswara Rao and Anjali Devi, with music composed by C. R. Subburaman.

== Cast ==
- Akkineni Nageswara Rao as Venkayya Naidu
- Anjali Devi as Sri Lakshmamma
- Kasturi Siva Rao as Rangadu
- Kona Prabhakar Rao as Kotayya Naidu
- Gadepalli as Musalappa Naidu
- Gowrinatha Sastry as Ramayya Naidu
- Kandikonda as Subbayya Naidu
- G. Varalakshmi as Pichamma
- Surabhi Balasaraswathi as Chitti
- Suryaprabha as Rangasani
- Seshamamba as Venkamma
- Rajaratnam as Peramma
- Kanthamma as Viswamaata
- Master Kundu as Chinna Kotayya Naidu
- Baby Narayani as Parvathi

== Crew ==
- Art: S. V. S. Rama Rao
- Choreography: Vedantam Raghavayya
- Dialogues — Lyrics: Balijepalli Lakshmikantham, Gopalaraya Sharma
- Playback: Susarla Dakshinamurthi, P. Leela, Jikki, C. R. Subburaman, Kasturi Siva Rao,
- Music: C. R. Subburaman
- Editing: G. D. Joshi
- Cinematography: P. Sridhar
- Producer — Director: Ghantasala Balaramayya
- Banner: Pratibha Productions
- Release Date: 26 February 1950

== Soundtrack ==
Sri Lakshmamma Katha

Film score by C. R. Subburaman
- Released: 1950
- Genre: Soundtrack
- Length: 28:45
- Producer: C. R. Subburaman

Music composed by C. R. Subburaman. Lyrics were written by Balijepalli Lakshmikantham, Gopalaraya Sharma. Music released on Audio Company.

S. No.	Song title	Singers	length
1	"Annem Punnem Yerugani"	C. R. Subburaman	4:22
2	"Cheetiki Maatiki Chittemmante"	Jikki, Kasturi Siva Rao	2:04
3	"Chinnari Bangaru"	P. Leela	3:05
4	"Gummadi Poola Kammani Gaali"	P. Leela	2:54
5	"Hayiga Veenula Vinduga"	Susarla Dakshinamurthi, P. Leela	3:14
6	"Idi Naa Vidhi Krutama"	P. Leela	3:28
7	"Jeevithame Vrudha Auno"	P. Leela	3:15
8	"Nattinta Maa Lakshmi"	P. Leela	1:39
9	"Thaalaga Jaalanu Ra"	A. P. Komala	2:50
10	"Velpuvai Velisevu"	Chorus	1:54
