= Swapna Sundari (film) =

- Theatrical release poster
- Directed by: Ghantasala Balaramayya
- Screenplay by: Samudrala Sr
- Based on: Kasi Majilee Kathalu
- Produced by: Ghantasala Balaramayya
- Starring: Akkineni Nageswara Rao; Anjali Devi
- Cinematography: P. Sridhar
- Edited by: G. D. Joshi
- Music by: C. R. Subburaman; Ghantasala
- Production company: Pratibha Productions
- Release date: 10 November 1950
- Running time: 173 minutes
- Country: India
- Language: Telugu

Swapna Sundari (transl. Dream Girl) is a 1950 Indian Telugu-language fantasy swashbuckler film, produced and directed by Ghantasala Balaramayya under the Pratibha Productions banner. It stars Akkineni Nageswara Rao and Anjali Devi, with music jointly composed by C. R. Subburaman and Ghantasala. The film is based on Kasi Majilee Kathalu and it was simultaneously dubbed in Tamil with the same name.

== Cast ==
- Akkineni Nageshwara Rao as Prabhu
- Anjali Devi as Swapna Sundari
- Kasturi Siva Rao as Abbi
- Mukkamala as Wizard
- G. Varalakshmi as Rani
- Surabhi Balasaraswati as Maya Pilla

== Soundtrack ==
Music jointly composed by C. R. Subburaman and Ghantasala.

=== Telugu Songs ===
Lyrics were written by Samudrala Sr.

Song title	Singers	length
"Saagumaa Saahinee"	Ghantasala	2:52
"Ee Seema Velasina"	Ghantasala, R. Balasaraswathi Devi	2:40
"Natanalu Thelusune"	R. Balasaraswathi Devi	3:14
"Nee Sari Neevele"	G. Varalakshmi	1:56
"Nijamaaye Kala Nijamaaye"	Ghantasala	2:20
"Kadoi Vagakada Kalakadoi"	Ghantasala, R. Balasaraswathi Devi	2:31
"O Swapna Sundari Kaanaga Naitinigaa"	Ghantasala, R. Balasaraswathi Devi	3:13
"O Paradesi"	R. Balasaraswathi Devi	02:24
"Kopamela Naapaina Nagini Naa Nagini"	Kasturi Sivarao & P. Leela	
"Ullam Magizhnthu Ennaiye"	G. Varalakshmi	
"Marali Ravo Manasu Ledo"	G. Varalakshmi	
"Ohoho Maa Raja Chuda Chakkani Vada"	K. Rani	03:29
"Paluke Pilla Nato Aa Aa Jaada"	Kasturi Sivarao & Jikki	02:22
"Ninne Valache Konara"	R. Balasaraswathi Devi	03:04

=== Tamil Songs ===
Lyrics were written by Thanjai N. Ramaiah Dass.

Song title	Singers	length
"Mayame Mayame Mayame Aagume"	Ghantasala	02:52
"Nee Inbam Ulakinil Thaane"	Ghantasala & R. Balasaraswathi Devi	02:40
"Nee Sariye Madhana"	R. Balasaraswathi Devi	03:14
"Sagasam Therinthathaiya Un"	G. Varalakshmi	01:56
"Nijamethan Nijamethan Idhu"	Ghantasala	02:20
"Komagane Nee Maha Thiyagiye"	Ghantasala & R. Balasaraswathi Devi	02:31
"O Swapna Sundari"	Ghantasala & R. Balasaraswathi Devi	03:13
"Pagattum Penne Yeno"	R. Balasaraswathi Devi	
"Kobameno En Mele"	S. C. Krishnan	
"Ullam Magizhnthu Ennaiye"	G. Varalakshmi	
"Maranthatheno Manathu"	G. Varalakshmi	
"Maharaja Soora Nee Jayaveera"	R. Balasaraswathi Devi	
