= Paithiyakkaran =

- Poster
- Directed by: Krishnan–Panju
- Screenplay by: S. V. Sahasranamam
- Story by: Narayan Hari Apte
- Produced by: D. Ramaswamy
- Starring: S. V. Sahasranamam; T. A. Mathuram; N. S. Krishnan; M. G. Ramachandran; D. Balasubramaniam; S. J. Kantha
- Cinematography: P. S. Selvaraj
- Edited by: S. Panjabi
- Music by: C. R. Subburaman; M. S. Gnanamani
- Production company: N. S. K. Pictures
- Release date: 26 September 1947
- Running time: 180 minutes
- Country: India
- Language: Tamil

Payithiyakaran (English title: Madman?) is a 1947 Indian Tamil-language film produced by and starring N. S. Krishnan. It was based on the play of the same name staged by Krishnan's drama troupe. It was the first film for Krishnan after his acquittal in the Lakshmikanthan murder case. M. G. Ramachandran played a supporting role in the film.

== Plot ==
Paithiyakaran was based on V. Shantaram's play Duniya Na Mane, which in turn was based on the Marathi novel, Na Patnari Goshta by Narayan Hari Apte. It was a socially themed movie which advocated for widow's right to remarry and against older men marrying women much younger to them.

== Cast ==
Cast according to the opening credits of the film

Male cast

- M. G. R as Moorthi
- N. S. K
- Sahasra Namam as Sekhar
- Kaka Radhakrishnan
- C. S. Pandian
- D. Balasubramaniam
- K. Chandrasekharan

Female cast

- Mathuram
- S. J. Kantha
- T. A. Jayalakshmi
- S. R. Janaki
- Saraswathi
- Baby Vadiva
- Bhagavathi
- Saroja (Dance)

== Production ==
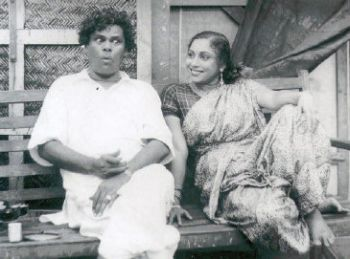
N. S. Krishnan and T. A. Mathuram

When N. S. Krishnan was in prison for the Lakshmikanthan murder case, his wife and comedian T. A. Mathuram started a drama troupe called N. S. K Nataka Sabha. The troupe mainly staged plays written by and starring S. V. Sahasranamam. Paithiyakaran (lit. The mad man) was one of those plays. When Krishnan was first sentenced to jail, Mathuram took a break from her acting career. Later she came out her self-imposed exile to generate revenues for financing her husband's appeal to the privy council. Paithiyakaran was based on V. Shantaram's 1937 film Duniya Na Mane. Mathuram converted the troupe into a film production company and made a film based on the play. The film advocated reformist social policies like widow remarriage. It was directed by the director duo of P. Krishnan and S. Panju. While the film was in production, Krishnan was acquitted in the murder case and was released from prison. A new role was written for him in the film. Mathuram played dual roles as the heroine and as Krishnan's comedic foil. Krishnan made fun of his stint in prison through the song jailukku poi vantha in which he described in prison life, his fellow inmates and the types of prisoners he met. Music for the film was composed by C. R. Subburaman and M. S. Gnanamani. Pattukoru pulavan bharathi – a work of the poet Kavimani Desigavinayagam Pillai was used in the film as lyrics for a song featuring T. A. Jayalakshmi. M. G. Ramachandran - aka MGR (later Chief minister of Tamil Nadu) played a supporting role in the film. MGR lip-synched a love duet song with T.A. Mathuram,sung by Ghantasala.The completed film was 16,201 feet in length. According to The Hindu and The New Indian Express, S. S. Rajendran played a minor role.

== Soundtrack ==
Music was composed by C. R. Subburaman & M. S. Gnanamani. Lyrics by Kavimani Desigavinayagam Pillai, Udumalai Narayana Kavi, K. P. Kamatchi & T. R. Sambanthamoorthi.

Singers are N. S. Krishnan & T. A. Mathuram. Playback singers are Ghantasala, P. A. Periyanayaki & T. S. Bhagavathi.

Song	Singers	Lyrics	Length
"Paattukoru Pulavan"	P. A. Periyanayaki	Kavimani Desigavinayagam Pillai	05:36
"Jeyikku Poi Vandhu"	N. S. Krishnan	Udumalai Narayana Kavi	02:44
"Solla mudiyatha -Jeeva Oliyaaga "	Ghantasala & P. A. Periyanayaki	Udumalai Narayana Kavi	02:27
"Asaiyaaga Pesi Pesi"	N. S. Krishnan & T. A. Mathuram	Udumalai Narayana Kavi	03:10
"Ninaivellam Veenanathe"			03:00
"Manamuvantha Maaran"	P. A. Periyanayaki	Udumalai Narayana Kavi	02:16
"Kasu Panam Kondavarkku"	N. S. Krishnan		
"Jegajothi Tharum Naale"	T. S. Bhagavathi		02:26

== Reception ==
The film was released on 26 September 1947 and was a box office hit. The film's success enabled Mathuram's production house to produce four more films and N. S. Krishnan began a successful stint as director.
