= Devadasu (1953 film) =

1953 film by Vedantam Raghavayya

- Theatrical release poster of the Telugu version
- Directed by: Vedantam Raghavayya
- Screenplay by: Chakrapani
- Dialogue by: Samudrala Sr. (Telugu) Udayakumar (Tamil)
- Based on: Devdas by Sarat Chandra Chattopadhyay
- Produced by: D. L. Narayana
- Starring: Akkineni Nageswara Rao; Savitri; Lalitha
- Cinematography: B. S. Ranga
- Edited by: P. V. Narayana
- Music by: Soundtrack: C. R. Subburaman; Background score: Viswanathan–Ramamoorthy
- Production company: Vinodha Pictures
- Distributed by: Vinodha Pictures
- Release dates: 26 June 1953 (Telegu); 11 September 1953 (Tamil)
- Running time: 191 minutes
- Country: India
- Languages: Telugu; Tamil

Devadasu is a 1953 Indian romantic drama film directed by Vedantam Raghavayya and produced by D. L. Narayana for Vinodha Pictures. Chakrapani wrote the script based on Sarat Chandra Chattopadhyay's 1917 novel, Devdas. C. R. Subbaraman composed the film's music. The film was edited by P. V. Narayanan, while B. S. Ranga provided the cinematography.

The film focuses on Devadasu and Parvati, who have been in love since childhood. Devadas' father rejects the proposal from Parvati's family. Parvati's father forces her to marry a middle-aged zamindar. Unable to cope with losing Parvati, Devadas turns into a drunkard, and the rest of the film is about whether or not Devadas meets Parvati again.

The film was produced in Telugu and Tamil languages (the latter titled Devadas) with slightly different casts. Akkineni Nageswara Rao, Savitri, and Lalitha played the lead roles in both versions; supporting roles were played by S. V. Ranga Rao, C. S. R. Anjaneyulu, Dorasamy and Surabhi Kamalabai.

Devadasu was released on 26 June 1953, and the Tamil version was released three months later, on 11 September 1953. Both versions were critically and commercially successful. It has since achieved cult status, with terms and phrases from the film being widely cited. Both versions proved to be a major breakthrough in both Savitri's and Nageswara Rao's careers, although they also led to the latter being typecast in similar roles.

== Plot ==
In the village of Ravulapalli, neighbours Devadas, the son of the wealthy Zamindar Narayana Rao, and Parvati, the daughter of a modest farmer named Neelakantham, share a close bond. As Devadas grows increasingly unruly, his father sends him to a boarding school in the city. Years later, Devadas returns to the village, and his friendship with Parvati evolves into romantic affection.

When Parvati's grandmother proposes a marriage alliance between Devadas and Parvati, Narayana Rao humiliates Neelakantham and rejects the proposal, citing differences in caste and social status. Offended, Neelakantham vows to marry Parvati into a family wealthier than Narayana Rao's. That night, Parvati secretly meets Devadas, pleading with him to accept her hand. Devadas hesitates and asks for time to reason with his father. When Narayana Rao threatens suicide to prevent the match, Devadas retreats to the city in confusion and writes a letter to Parvati expressing his inability to marry her. Shortly after, Neelakantham arranges Parvati's marriage with the elderly Zamindar of Durgapuram. Realising his mistake, Devadas returns to the village to persuade Parvati, but she rejects his proposal out of self-respect and proceeds with her father's choice.

Devastated by his loss, Devadas turns to alcohol in the city with his friend Bhagawan, who introduces him to a courtesan named Chandramukhi. Although Devadas initially spurns Chandramukhi and treats her with disdain, she develops a deep devotion towards him, renounces her profession, and attempts to care for his failing health. Meanwhile, Narayana Rao passes away in remorse over his son's decline. Parvati manages her new household, earns the respect of her husband, and cares for his children. During a brief visit to her parental home, she meets Devadas and urges him to quit drinking; he agrees only to promise that he will visit her one last time before his death.

Devadas continues his self-destructive alcoholism, causing his health to deteriorate rapidly. A doctor warns him that his condition is terminal and advises him to return to his hometown. Vowing to conjoin Chandramukhi in their next life, Devadas recalls his promise to Parvati and travels towards Durgapuram. Upon reaching the gates of Parvati's residence, he collapses and dies. Learning of his presence outside, Parvati attempts to rush to him, but her family locks the doors to prevent her from leaving, causing her to collapse in grief as Devadas's body is taken away.

== Cast ==
- Akkineni Nageswara Rao as Devadasu (Devadas in Tamil)
  - Master Sudhakar as young Devadasu
- Savitri as Parvati
  - Baby Anuradha as young Parvati (Telugu)
  - Sachu as young Parvati (Tamil)
- Lalitha as Chandramukhi
- S. V. Ranga Rao as Narayana Rao
- C. S. R. Anjaneyulu as the zamindar of Durgapuram
- Doraswamy as Neelakantham
- Surabhi Kamalabai as Parvati's grandmother
- Peketi Sivaram as Bhagawan (Telugu)
  - M. N. Nambiar as Bhagawan (Tamil)

== Production ==
When people saw me on screen in Devadasu, they assumed that I starved myself to look like the heartbroken, alcoholic that I played on screen. Truth is far from it. I was actually healthy with robust looks. After watching myself I realised that no matter how hard I tried, I didn't look like a drunkard because my eyes were clear. So, I requested the director to shift the shooting schedule to the night. I used to stuff myself with heavy dinner and then shoot overnight ... even as my eyes were dropping, heavy with sleep. The effect was excellent and that's how I pulled Devadasu off.

— Akkineni Nageswara Rao, on his character in an interview in April 2013.

Devadasu was directed by Vedantham Raghavayya and produced by D. L. Narayana under the production banner of Vinodha Pictures. It was produced simultaneously in Telugu and Tamil languages (the latter as Devadas). The film's script, which was written by Chakrapani, was based on the novel Devdas by Sarat Chandra Chattopadhyay. The story of Devadasu centers around a feudal lord's son Devadasu falling in love with a poor girl Parvati. Due to differences in their social and economic status, Devadasu cannot marry his childhood love and Parvati marries an old man. Unable to forget her, he becomes alcoholic. Devadasu was the first Telugu adaptation of Chattopadhyay's novel, and Devadas was the second Tamil adaptation of the same, following the 1937 Devadas directed by and starring P. V. Rao.

The film was launched by Vinoda Pictures with Akkineni Nageswara Rao and Sowcar Janaki as the lead pair. After a week of shooting, the film was shelved due to the view that such a story might not succeed in Telugu; the production company instead produced Shanti, which became a failure. One of the partners, D. L. Narayana then decided to revive Devadasu as an independent producer. Janaki, who was originally chosen for the character of Parvati, was replaced by Savitri. Arani Sathyanarayana portrayed the role of Devadasu's man Friday. Peketi Sivaram, who went on to become a famous director, portrayed the role of Bhagawan. S. V. Ranga Rao, C. S. R. Anjaneyulu, and Surabhi Kamalabai were selected to portray supporting roles. Lalitha of the Travancore Sisters was signed to play Chandramukhi, the courtesan.

Samudrala Sr. and Udaykumar wrote the dialogue for the Telugu and Tamil versions, respectively. B. S. Ranga was recruited as the director of photography, and P. V. Narayana edited the film. Vali and Kotwankar were the art directors.

Principal photography commenced with Nagaraja Rao, a still photographer shooting some stills of Nageswara Rao in the guise of Devadasu, with a glass in his hand and the looks of a drunkard. Rao also took shots of Savitri in Parvati's make-up in Naarsu's Studio. Impressed with these stills, Narayana decided to use the same make-up for the real shooting of the film. He showed these make-up stills to Mangayya, the make-up man, who followed the same. Nageswara Rao, who portrayed the titular character, later recalled that Vedantam, being a Kuchipudi dance exponent and an experienced stage actor, used to enact the scenes before the actors, thereby making their job easy. He even recalled that the director shot him only at night so that he could give the character a "drunken, droopy" look. Those night-time shots were filmed over 50 days. The final length of both versions was 17,260 feet (5,260 m).

== Themes ==
Nageswara Rao compared Devadasu to his character in Batasari (1961), stating, "Characters like Batasari and [Devadasu] are not too explicit. They preserve their inner feelings - to be enjoyed in solitude. I am also a man like that."

== Music ==
Devadasu

Soundtrack album by C. R. Subbaraman
- Released: 1 February 1954
- Recorded: 1953
- Genre: Feature film soundtrack
- Length: 32:25
- Label: His Master's Voice
- Producer: C. R. Subbaraman

The official soundtracks of Devadas were composed by C. R. Subbaraman. The lyrics were written by Samudrala Sr. and Udumalai Narayana Kavi and K. D. Santhanam for the Telugu and Tamil versions, respectively. Though Samudrala is credited as the lyricist in the film, M. L. Narasimham of The Hindu believes that Malladi Ramakrishna Sasthri also wrote some of the lyrics. C. R. Subbaraman died before the film's release, and the remaining songs were composed by his assistants M. S. Viswanathan and T. K. Ramamoorthy. Among them was "Jagame Maaya", titled "Ulagaae Maayam" in Tamil. (Note: Ramamoorthy claimed to have composed "Jagame Maaya" by himself. Ghantasala's statement contradicted that of Ramamoorthy's as he says the song was composed by Viswanathan.)

The soundtrack of the Telugu version was released on 1 February 1954 and the Tamil version was released on 25 March 1954; both were marketed by His Master's Voice. The soundtracks were a huge commercial success, with "Jagame Maaya" and "Kala Idani", in particular, achieving cult status. Songs like "Ulage Maayam" and "O Devadas" became popular among the Tamil diaspora. The song "Kudi Yemaithe" was composed using the Kalyani raga. The song "Kala Idani" was composed using Saveri raga. The song "Intha Telisi" is composed in various ragas. The song "Palleku Podam" was later remixed by Anup Rubens for Aatadukundam Raa (2016).

The soundtracks received positive reviews from critics. Reviewing the Tamil version, Randor Guy of The Hindu stated that the songs "contributed to the [film's] success". Reviewing the Telugu version, M. L. Narasimham from the same newspaper also praised the songs, noting, "The major contribution to the film's success, however, came from the music director, a genius called C. R. Subbaraman. Every song he composed is a hit to this day." S. Theodore Baskaran in his book The Eye of the Serpent noted, "One factor that sustains the popularity of this film to this is the songs [sic]". On "Intha Telisi", Dakshinamurthy M. of The Hans India noted, "The 'pallavi' and 'charanam' are in Kharaharapriya, second 'charanam' is in Ranjani and the last one is in Mohana. The switching from 'charanam' to 'pallavi' and vice versa is so smooth, one forgets to notice the change in 'ragam' and 'bhavam'."

Telugu tracklist
No.	Title	Singer(s)	Length
1.	"Andaala Anandam"	R. Balasaraswathi Devi	03:17
2.	"Antha Bhranthi Yena"	K. Rani	03:02
3.	"Chelitya Ledhu"	Ghantasala, K. Rani	04:05
4.	"Jagame Maya"	Ghantasala	03:17
5.	"Oh Devada"	K. Jamuna Rani, Udutha Sarojini	02:51
6.	"Intha Telisiyundi"	R. Balasaraswathi Devi	03:32
7.	"Kudi Yedamaithe"	Ghantasala	03:08
8.	"O Devada"	Ghantasala, Jikki	02:51
9.	"Palleku Podam"	Ghantasala	02:27
10.	"Thane Marena"	R. Balasaraswathi Devi	03:16
11.	"Kala Idani"	Ghantasala	03:08

Tamil tracklist
No.	Title	Singer(s)	Length
1.	"Santosham Vendrum"	R. Balasaraswathi Devi	03:17
2.	"Ellam Maayai"	K. Rani	03:02
3.	"Uravum Illai"	Ghantasala, K. Rani	04:15
4.	"Ulagaae Maayam"	Ghantasala	03:17
5.	"Oh Devatha"	K. Jamuna Rani, Udutha Sarojini	02:51
6.	"Paramugam Enaya"	R. Balasaraswathi Devi	03:32
7.	"Thunintha Pin"	Ghantasala	03:08
8.	"O Devadas"	Ghantasala, Jikki	02:51
9.	"Santosham Tharum"	Ghantasala	02:27
10.	"Anbe Pavama"	R. Balasaraswathi Devi	03:16
11.	"Kanavithuthan"	Ghantasala	03:08

== Release ==
Devadasu, was released on 26 June 1953, and Devadas was released three months later on 11 September 1953. Both versions were commercially successful, playing for over 100 days in theatres. Randor Guy, however noted that after the film's release, there were bickerings between the partners over the division of profits and Subbaraman's widow had to go to court, as did Lalitha for her balance remuneration. In 2002, the film was screened under the "Devdas Retrospective Section" during the 33rd International Film Festival of India.

== Reception ==
Devadasu received positive reviews from critics upon its release. M. L. Narasimham praised the performances of the film's cast, particularly that of Nageswara Rao. He added that B. S. Ranga's "excellent" cinematography and C. R. Subbaraman's music were the film's highlights apart from Vedantham Raghavayya's direction. Reviewing Devadas, Randor Guy wrote that the film was remembered for "empathetically brilliant performance of Nageswara Rao in the title role and equally impressive acting by Savithri". S. Theodore Baskaran described the casting of Nageswara Rao and Savitri as "near perfect". Hindustan Times stated that Nageswara Rao's performance "remains a classic portrayal of the character that has been adapted on-screen several times". Film archivist P. K. Nair noted, "Akkineni Nageshwara Rao identified himself with the character so intensely [...] that it remains one of Telugu cinema’s outstanding performances." The 2002 book Living legend, Dr. Akkineni (edited by M. K. Ramu) called Nageshwara Rao "the perfect manifestation of Sarat's vision" of the title character. In contrast, Nageswara Rao at one point did not rate the film so highly because he felt it did not "convey the Sarat mood well enough."

C. S. H. N. Murthy, author of the 2012 Routledge article Film remakes as cross-cultural connections between North and South, praised Devadasu for "follow[ing] closely the text of the novel as a hypotext". Murthy was the first author to interpret the Devadas phenomenon in terms of de-westernising media studies by appropriately locating the character of Devadas into the relevant and contemporary religious ethos of India that time. Murthy was not only critical of the Western Scholars' interpretations of Devadas as a narcissist and pseudo-masochist but also questioned their theoretical frameworks based on Western Sexualities and Post-feminism. While placing the crux of the adaptation studies using film as text, he rightly pointed out the dissonance in trying to draw such comparisons based on Western film theories. His article endeavours to make a critical intervention in current South Asian Studies by aiming to provide novel theoretical frame work, hitherto unknown and unheard in Indian film studies, to which philosophical and traditional tenets grounding the novella of Devadas can be anchored.

== Legacy ==
Devadasu and Devadas are regarded as among the most successful films in Telugu and Tamil cinema respectively. Upon release, the dialogue Thaagithe maruva galanu, thaaganivvaru, marichipothe thaagagalanu, maruvanivvaru (English: If I drink, I can forget, but they don't let me drink, If I forget, I can drink, but they don't let me forget.) became famous. The film proved to be a major breakthrough in Nageswara Rao's career. The success of the film made him known as the "Tragedy King" of Telugu cinema and also led to his becoming typecast in similar roles. In order to shed the tragic-romantic hero image, he accepted a comic role in Missamma (1955). Savitri too appeared in Missamma, and her character in that film was described by Pa. Dheenadhayalan of Dinamani as an antithesis of her role in Devadasu. Vaazhvey Maayam (1982), which was named after a line from "Ulagaae Maayam", was described by Encyclopaedia of Indian Cinema as an "update of the Devdas plot".

In July 2007, S. R. Ashok Kumar of The Hindu asked eight Tamil directors to list ten of their favourite films. Balu Mahendra named Devadas as one of his top ten Tamil films. He said that it had "superb lighting by B. S. Ranga, excellent performances by A. Nageswara Rao and Savithri, and haunting music by C. R. Subbaraman". Actor Sivakumar stated, "You can’t reproduce movies like Parasakthi, Pasamalar, Devadas, Veerapandiya Kattabomman or Ratha Kanneer [...] By remaking such films, you are lowering yourself, while it enhances the original artists’ image." YVS Chowdary titled his 2006 comedy film Devadasu, though it had no similarity with this film. In May 2012, Radhika Rajamani of Rediff.com mentioned Devadasu for the letter D in her list, "The A to Z of Telugu Cinema". During a programme titled "Telugu Cinema Prasthanam" organised by the film society of Vishakhapatnam, writer and actor Ravi Kondala Rao placed Devadasu among other Telugu films like Bhakta Prahlada (1932), Mala Pilla (1938), Pathala Bhairavi (1951) and Lava Kusa (1963) during a speech on the role of Telugu cinema in the hundred years of Indian cinema. In April 2013, News18 included the film in its list of "100 greatest Indian films of all time". Indo-Asian News Service described Devadasu as one of Nageswara Rao's "best films". Dilip Kumar, who portrayed Devadas in the 1955 film directed by Bimal Roy, admitted that Nageswara Rao's performance as the character was better than his own, remarking, "There is only one Devadas (1953), and that is Akkineni Nageswara Rao." A scene from Devadasu, in which the title character converses with a street dog while drunk, was parodied in a promotional still from Majnu (2016), where the male lead (Nani) humorously converses with a stuffed puppy, while imitating Devadasu's mannerisms. In the film Muthu (1995), a drunk Valayapathi (Vadivelu) who is lying in the car will be singing "Kanavidhu Than".

== Sequel ==
In 1978 a sequel to the film released Devadasu Malli Puttadu. It deals with the rebirth of Devadasu, with Nageswara Rao reprising his role.
