= Ulagam Palavitham =

1955 film directed by S. A. Murugesh

- Theatrical release poster
- Directed by: S. A. Murugesh
- Written by: V. N. Sambandham (dialogues)
- Screenplay by: T. R. Raghunath
- Starring: Sivaji Ganesan; Lalitha
- Cinematography: G. Vittal Rao
- Edited by: S. A. Murugesh
- Music by: N. S. Balakrishnan
- Production company: National Productions
- Release date: 14 April 1955
- Country: India
- Language: Tamil

Ulagam Palavitham (transl. People are varied) is a 1955 Indian Tamil-language film, directed by S. A. Murugesh. The film stars Sivaji Ganesan and Lalitha. It was released on 14 April 1955. The film was dubbed in Telugu as Antha Peddale in 1959.

== Cast ==
Male cast

- Sivaji Ganesan as Arunagiri
- P. S. Veerappa
- V. K. Ramasamy
- T. K. Ramachandran
- K. A. Thangavelu
- T. V. Radhakrishnan
- M. R. Santhanam
- S. V. Shanmugam
- M. A. Ganapathy

Female cast

- Lalitha as Indra
- M. Lakshmiprabha
- M. N. Rajam
- M. Saroja
- C. K. Saraswathi
- Baby T. R. Rajakumari

== Production ==
Ulagam Palavitham was directed by S. A. Murugesh, and produced by National Productions. The screenplay was written by T. R. Raghunath, and the dialogues by V. N. Sambandham. Cinematography was handled by G. Vittal Rao, and editing by Murugesh.

== Soundtrack ==
The music was composed by N. S. Balakrishnan.

Song	Singers	Lyrics	Length
"Asai Kanave Nee Vaa"	T. M. Soundararajan & P. Leela	Thanjai N. Ramaiah Dass	02:36
"Akkam Pakkam Yaarum Kanndaa"	Thiruchi Loganathan & K. Rani	Thanjai N. Ramaiah Dass	02:03
"Oraan Oraan Thottatthile"	A. G. Rathnamala	Thanjai N. Ramaiah Dass	01:01
"Agappada Maattaan Agappada Maattaan"	K. A. Thangavelu		05:31
"Annaiyum Pithavum.... Aaabath Paandhavaa Anaathai Ratchagaa"	Puthuvai Loganathan & P. Leela	Thanjai N. Ramaiah Dass	05:48
"Kadavul Endroruvan.... Kadavul Endra Peyarai Solli"	T. M. Soundararajan	A. Maruthakasi	02:25
"Vazhkkai Odam Odavum"	T. M. Soundararajan & P. Leela	A. Maruthakasi	03:18
"Ulagam Palavitham Ulagam"	T. S. Bagavathi	A. Maruthakasi	02:59
"Vesham Poduthe Ulagam"		Thanjai N. Ramaiah Dass	
"Deivame Illaiye Ulagil"	N. L. Ganasaraswathi	Thanjai N. Ramaiah Dass	02:57
"Adimaiyendre Ennathe Penne"	M. L. Vasanthakumari	Thanjai N. Ramaiah Dass	02:16
"Ulagame Un Sathiyal"	P. Leela	Thanjai N. Ramaiah Dass	03:09
"Ulagam Palavitham Aiyaa"	Puthuvai Loganathan, N. S. Balakrishnan, A. G. Rathnamala & K. Rani	Thanjai N. Ramaiah Dass	06:58
"Ullathai Nee Sollathe"	T. M. Soundararajan & G. Kasthoori	K. P. Kamatchi Sundaram	

== Release ==
Ulagam Palavitham was released on 14 April 1955, delayed from an initial March release.
