= Mohini (1948 film) =

- Theatrical release poster
- Directed by: Lanka Sathiyam
- Written by: S. D. Sundharam
- Screenplay by: A. S. A. Sami
- Produced by: M. Somasundharam
- Starring: T. S. Balaiah; M.G. Ramachandran; Madhuri Devi; V. N. Janaki
- Cinematography: M. Masthan
- Edited by: D. Durairaj
- Music by: S. M. Subbaiah Naidu; C. R. Subburaman
- Production company: Jupiter Pictures
- Release date: 31 October 1948
- Country: India
- Language: Tamil

Mohini is a 1948 Indian Tamil-language film directed by Lanka Sathiyam and produced by M. Somasundharam. It stars T. S. Balaiah, M. G. Ramachandran, V. N. Janaki, Madhuri Devi, Pulimoottai Ramaswami, M. N. Nambiar and R. Balasubramaniam. It was released on 31 October 1948.

== Cast ==
Male cast

- T. S. Balaiah as Mohankumar
- M. G. Ramachandran as Vijayakumar
- R. Balasubramaniam
- Pulimootai Ramasami as Sathyabala King
- M. N. Nambiar
- M. A. Ganapathi
- C. P. Kittan
- Nott Annaji Rao

Female cast

- V. N. Janaki as Mohini
- Madhuri Devi as Kumari
- M. S. S. Bhagyam

Dance

- Lalitha & Padmini

Kumari's Dance Group

- K. Malathi
- R. Lakshmisundaram
- D. Bharathi
- C. A. Nirmala Devi
- B. R. Lakshmi
- K. Rathnam
- M. D. Kamala Bai
- T. Ranganayaki

== Production ==
Sami decided to have a scene of flying horse inspired from Arabian Nights. The scene was picturised using Optical Printing on the film's antagonist R. Balasubramaniam by creating a machine horse on the budget of ₹40,000 (equivalent to ₹4.9 million or US$51,000 in 2026).

== Soundtrack ==
Music composed by S. M. Subbaiah Naidu & C. R. Subburaman. Lyrics were penned by T. K. Sundara Vathiyar and 'Bhoomi' Balakadas. The song Aahaa Ivar Yaaradi was a hit. C. R. Subburaman composed the music for this song. G. Ramanathan went to Subburaman's home and congratulated him for the excellent composition in classical music.

Song	Singer	Length
"Vasantha Maalai Neram"	C. R. Subburaman & T. V. Rathnam	04:27
"Aahaa Ivar Yaaradi"	P. Leela & K. V. Janaki	04:55
"Vinaidhanai Aruppaan"	M. M. Mariyappa	01:22
"Maayamaai Vanthennai Mayanga"	K. V. Janaki	02:39
"Raajaadhi Raajar Mechum"	M. S. S. Bhagyam	02:56
"Aahaa Aahaa Adhisayam"	P. Leela & K. V. Janaki	03:11
"Vaazhkkai Ivvidham Aamo"	K. V. Janaki	02:34
"Vaa En Aruge Maaraa Singaaraa"	K. V. Janaki	02:32
"Unmaiyaa Idhu Unmaiyaa"	T. S. Balaiah	03:01

== Reception ==
The Indian Express wrote, "The story is so full of action that it is difficult to narrate it succinctly".
