= Manamagal =

- Poster
- Directed by: N. S. Krishnan
- Screenplay by: M. Karunanidhi
- Based on: Suprabha by Munshi Paramu Pillai
- Produced by: N. S. Krishnan
- Starring: Padmini; Lalitha; S. V. Sahasranamam; T. S. Balaiah
- Cinematography: G. Vittal Rao
- Edited by: S. Panjabi
- Music by: C. R. Subburaman
- Production company: N. S. K. Films
- Release date: 15 August 1951
- Country: India
- Language: Tamil

Manamagal (transl. The Bride) is a 1951 Indian Tamil-language drama film, directed and produced by N. S. Krishnan. The film stars Padmini, Lalitha, S. V. Sahasranamam and T. S. Balaiah in lead roles. It is based on the Malayalam play Suprabha by playwright Munshi Paramu Pillai. The film was released on 15 August 1951. It was dubbed into Telugu as Pelli Kuthuru.

== Plot ==
Mei Kandar runs an ashram called Thiruvalluvar ashram for poor kids, providing them education and other skills for their future. On one occasion, his students rescue Chandra, a poor widowed pregnant woman abandoned by her remarried husband Bagavathar (Music Teacher). Chandra gives birth to a boy baby who later grows up in the ashram. Meanwhile, abandoning his first wife, Bagavathar moves to teach music to a rich person's daughter Kumari. But she is already engaged to S. V. Sahasranamam, son of her father's family friend. Kumari's father also has an accountant who married a young girl Vijaya. Kumari's father is the one who sponsors the ashram run by N. S. Krishnan. After the arrival of Chandra, the ashram goes under more progressive changes.

Meanwhile, Bagavathar, teaching music has an eye on Kumari to marry her as second wife by hiding his previous life. Bagavathar also tries to seduce the accountant's wife Vijaya who is distressed due to the age difference of her husband. Varathan, a friend of Bagavathar moving along with him from his days with Chandra, gives suggestions to cheat and marry Kumari avoiding Sahasranamam. Kumari "to-be husband" S. V. Sahasranamam is away in England for his Barrister studies and returns to her home. Knowing Bagavathar's intentions when he is trying to propose to Kumari, he clashes with Bagavathar earning Kumari's ire. Kumari, out of anger, decides to marry Bagavathar. Taking a twist in the plot, circumstances force her to marry him. Situations lead to Madhuram son's death where Kumari learns about Bagavathar. Kumari's father learns about Bagavathar and his affairs seeing his accountant roaming mad in Mahabalipuram. Meanwhile, Kumari donates all her wealth to the ashram as Bagavathar and her illicit partner, his friend lavishly spend money. Knowing about her donations to the ashram, Kumari is kidnapped to force her to give her property to the antagonists. Leading to a climax — the heroine discards her namesake husband and in a reformative gesture marries her boyfriend Sahasranamam.

== Cast ==
Cast according to the opening credits of the film

Male cast

- N. S. Krishnan as Meikandar
- S. V. Sahasranamam as Chandran
- T. S. Balaiah as Balu
- T. S. Durairaj as Varadan
- Pulimootai Ramasami
- Azhwar Kuppusami
- D. Balasubramanyam as Parandhaman
- C. S. Pandian
- T. V. Radhakrishnan as Student
- K. A. Thangavelu as Kumari's Servant
- M. M. Jayasakthivel
- P. V. Chinnasami
- K. M. Goureesam Pillai
- K. Chandrasekharan
- V. Narayanan
- Kandasami Pillai

Female cast

- T. A. Mathuram as Radhai
- Lalitha as Vijaya
- Padmini as Kumari
- Gandhimathi as Student
- Nagarathnam
- Krishnaveni
- Jayalakshmi
- Kusalakumari
- Pattammal
- Ragini
- Thangam
- Suryakumari
- Kamala
- Leela
- P. G. Parvathi

== Production ==
Based on a popular Malayalam play Suprabha by playwright Munshi Paramu Pillai, Manamagal had dialogue by M. Karunanidhi. N. S. Krishnan directed the film, besides playing a social reformer. The title refers to the heroine (Padmini) who chooses to remain a bride and never a wife because of the lecherous nature of her husband (T. S. Balaiah). Krishnan decided to adapt the play into a film after being impressed by the plotline. Krishnan met Munshi and paid him Rs. 500 for the rights.

Krishnan chose Karunanidhi to write the dialogues. The film was launched at Newton Studios at 31 December 1950. A. Bhimsingh who was one of the assistant directors in the film was assigned the job to dub the film in Telugu. Some scenes were shot in Telugu to make it look like a straight Telugu film. According to film producer and writer G. Dhananjayan, S. S. Rajendran made his acting debut with this film in a role of a beggar, but his portions were edited out by the Censor Board as they felt his dialogues were too revolutionary, though Rajendran's name remains in the credits. The film marked the acting debut of Padmini as a lead actress. K. A. Thangavelu, Kaka Radhakrishnan did a minor role in the film. In the film, Krishnan introduced a technical innovation by showing the behind-the-screen-technicians on screen.

== Soundtrack ==
The music was composed by C. R. Subburaman.

The song "Ellam Inbamaayam" was well received and catapulted its singer M. L. Vasanthakumari to fame. This song was composed based on six ragas of Carnatic music. The song "Ellam Inbamayam", based on the Kalyani raga, starts with Simhendramadhyamam and having a ragamalika suite of Mohanam, Hindolam and Darbar. The song "Chinnanchiru Kiliiye" based on the poem by Subramaniya Bharati was sung by V. N. Sundaram. This song is based on Kapi raga. Originally, GNB was supposed to sing this song with Vasanthakumari. GNB had some rehearsals too, when T. R. Balu protested that GNB should not sing for the film, he opted out.

Tamil

Song	Singers	Lyrics	Length
"Chinnanciru kiliye Kannammaa"	M. L. Vasanthakumari & V. N. Sundaram	Mahakavi Bharathiyar	03:29
"Nalla Pennmani Miga Nalla Pennmani"	T. A. Madhuram	Udumalai Narayana Kavi	03:08
"Ellaam Inbamayam"	M. L. Vasanthakumari & P. Leela	Udumalai Narayana Kavi	05:32
"Aayirathu Tholaayirathu"	M. L. Vasanthakumari & P. Leela	Udumalai Narayana Kavi	04:03
"Podhu Kootangalukkum Poradhum"	T. A. Madhuram	Udumalai Narayana Kavi	00:49
"Sudhandhiram Vandhadhunnu Solaadheenga"	T. A. Madhuram	Udumalai Narayana Kavi	01:19
"Paaviyinum Padu Paavi"	M. L. Vasanthakumari & V. N. Sundaram	Udumalai Narayana Kavi	02:59
"Villambu Patta Pun"	C. S. Jayaraman	Udumalai Narayana Kavi	02:54
"Aanaa Vilaasam Appaa"	T. S. Durairaj	Udumalai Narayana Kavi	01:52
"Aadiduven Nadanam Aadiduven"	P. Leela	Udumalai Narayana Kavi	02:22
"Iru Kaadhalar Magizhndhe"	C. R. Subburaman & M. L. Vasanthakumari	Udumalai Narayana Kavi	02:23

Pelli Kuthuru Telugu songs

Song	Singers	Lyrics	Length (m:ss)
"Kanne Chilaka Yegiripodhu"	M. L. Vasanthakumari & C. R. Subburaman	Samudrala Sr.	03:29
"Nannu Dayaganave Vayyari"		Samudrala Sr.	03:08
"Anthaa Premamayam"	M. L. Vasanthakumari & P. Leela	Samudrala Sr.	05:32
"1950 Ki 60 Inthe Theda"	M. L. Vasanthakumari & A. P. Komala	Samudrala Sr.	04:03
"Nenu Nee Dasuda"		Samudrala Sr.	00:49
"Ivigo Jothalu Telungu Thallee"		Samudrala Sr.	01:19
"Papulao Kadu Papi Anevadu"	M. L. Vasanthakumari & C. R. Subburaman	Samudrala Sr.	02:59
"Noru Manchidaithe Naruda"	Madhavapeddi Satyam	Samudrala Sr.	02:54
"Yebbe Yebbebbe YebbeIllu"		Samudrala Sr.	01:52
"Manchi Chinnade Mamanchi Chinnadi"	Jikki	Samudrala Sr.	02:22
"Virajajula Valapu Vayyari"	M. L. Vasanthakumari & C. R. Subburaman	Samudrala Sr.	02:23

== Release and reception ==
Manamagal became a commercial success at box office. The Malayalam play which was the base was thematically similar to Hindi film Duniya Na Maane by V. Shantaram.

The film received positive reviews for its bold theme. The magazine Pesum Padam wrote, "Producer made the film with reformative intentions but the film leads to indiscipline only". After the film's success, Krishnan gifted Karunanidhi a car for celebrating the success.

== Bibliography ==
- Dhananjayan, G. (2014). Pride of Tamil Cinema: 1931–2013. Blue Ocean Publishers. OCLC 898765509.
