= Kalpana (1960 film) =

1960 Indian film

- Directed by: R. K. Rakhan
- Written by: Akhtar-Ul-Iman; Jalal Malihabadi; R. K. Rakhan
- Screenplay by: R. K. Rakhan
- Story by: Akhtar-Ul-Iman
- Produced by: T. S. Ganesh; Ashok Kumar
- Starring: Ashok Kumar; Padmini; Ragini; Iftekhar; Achala Sachdev
- Cinematography: Ratan L. Nagar
- Edited by: Bimal Roy
- Music by: O. P. Nayyar
- Production company: Ashok Pictures Pvt. Ltd.
- Release date: 1960
- Country: India
- Language: Hindi

Kalpana is a 1960 Indian Hindi-language romantic drama film directed by R.K. Rakhan. It stars Ashok Kumar, Padmini and Ragini, with Iftekhar and Achala Sachdev in supporting roles. The film was written by Akhtar-Ul-Iman with contributions from Jalal Malihabadi and Rakhan himself. The music was composed by O. P. Nayyar, with lyrics by Hasrat Jaipuri, Qamar Jalalabadi, Raja Mehdi Ali Khan and Jan Nisar Akhtar.

== Plot ==
Widower Amar (Ashok Kumar) leads a middle-class lifestyle in Bombay along with his widowed mother and a daughter, Munni (Baby Farida). His wife died soon after giving birth to Munni. Amar is the principal of Bharti Kala Kendra. While vacationing in Kashmir with his butler D'Souza (Sunder), he meets and falls in love with Kalpana (Padmini). They meet several times and are drawn to each other, but when Amar goes to propose he finds that Kalpana has left suddenly. On the train home, he meets Asha (Ragini), who he hires as a dance teacher at his academy. Amar’s mother and daughter approve of Asha, hoping she will marry him. However, Amar later sees Kalpana perform in a theatre production, rekindling their romance. Asha, heartbroken, steps aside. Amar introduces Kalpana to his family, but her brother Johar (Iftekhar) reveals her background and their mother’s past, which causes a crisis. The resolution of these conflicts forms the rest of the story.

== Cast ==
- Ashok Kumar as Amar
- Padmini as Kalpana
- Ragini as Asha
- Iftekhar as Johar
- Achala Sachdev as Kishori Bai
- Sunder as D'Souza
- Baby Farida as Munni
- Lalitha as Woman
- Brahm Bhardwaj as Chairman of Bharti Kala Kendra
- S. Nazir
- Balam

== Soundtrack ==
The soundtrack was composed by O. P. Nayyar, with lyrics by Hasrat Jaipuri, Qamar Jalalabadi, Raja Mehdi Ali Khan, and Jan Nisar Akhtar.

Song	Singer(s)	Lyricist
"Aana Aana Atariya Pe"	Asha Bhosle	Raja Mehdi Ali Khan
"Assalaam Aalekum Babu, Kaho Kaisa Haal Hai"	Asha Bhosle, Sudha Malhotra	Raja Mehdi Ali Khan
"Bekasi Had Se Jab"	Asha Bhosle	Jan Nisar Akhtar
"Chale aao khareedaron...Hamen Maro Na Nainon Ke Baan"	Asha Bhosle	Qamar Jalalabadi
"Humko Samajh Na Lijiye"	Asha Bhosle	Raja Mehdi Ali Khan
"Jaaye jahaan meri nazar....Phir Bhi Hai Dil Bekarar"	Asha Bhosle	Qamar Jalalabadi
"Main Khidki Pe Aaungi, Jab Sham Ko Suraj Dhalega"	Asha Bhosle, Mohammed Rafi	Qamar Jalalabadi
"O ji, Sawan Mein Bhi Hoon Bekarar"	Asha Bhosle	Hasrat Jaipuri
"Pyara Pyara Hai Sama, Saiyan Jate Ho Kahan"	Asha Bhosle, Mohammed Rafi	Raja Mehdi Ali Khan
"Tu Hai Mera Prem Devta, In Charanon Ki Dasi Hoon"	Manna Dey, Mohammed Rafi	Qamar Jalalabadi

Two songs are set in Hindustani ragas: "Bekasi Had Se Jab" (Desh) and "Tu Hai Mera Prem Devta" (Lalit).
