= Gokuladasi =

- Theatrical poster
- Directed by: K. Subrahmanyam
- Screenplay by: K. Subrahmanyam
- Story by: Elangovan
- Produced by: K. Subrahmanyam
- Starring: C. Honnappa Bhagavathar; M. V. Rajamma; T. R. Ramachandran; N. Krishnamurthi; Lalitha; Padmini
- Cinematography: P. L. Rai
- Edited by: R. Rajagopal
- Music by: S. V. Venkatraman
- Production company: Madras United Artistes Corporation
- Distributed by: Madras United Artistes Corporation
- Release date: November 1948
- Country: India
- Language: Tamil

Gokuladasi (transl. Gokulam's Devotee) is a 1948 Indian Tamil-language film directed and produced by K. Subrahmanyam. The film stars C. Honnappa Bhagavathar and M. V. Rajamma in lead roles, with T. R. Ramachandran, N. Krishnamurthi, Lalitha, and Padmini in supporting roles.

== Plot ==
Kamaroopan is a lustful king who faces the curse of Goddess Parvati and is reborn as a common jeweller in the town of Gokulam. The jeweller happens to set his eyes on a Devadasi named Anuradha and tries to woo her. Anuradha, on the other hand, was a singer-dancer in her previous birth and a devotee of Parvati. She was cursed by sage Narada for displeasing him and is reborn as Anuradha. The jeweller keeps trying to seduce Anuradha, not realising the actions he had committed in his previous life. Krishna rids both the jeweller and the Devadasi of their curses.

== Cast ==
Adapted from Film News Anandan and The Hindu.

- C. Honnappa Bhagavathar as Narada/Kamaroopan/a jeweller
- M. V. Rajamma as a singer-dancer/Anuradha
- T. R. Ramachandran
- N. Krishnamurthi
- Lalitha
- Padmini as Krishna
- Sowdhamini
- R. M. Somasundaram
- N. Thiruvengadam
- K. S. Angamuthu
- S. Sarojini
- Baby Sathyavathi

Dance

- Lalitha
- Padmini

== Production ==
K. Subrahmanyam directed and produced the film under his own banner, the Madras United Artistes Corporation. The story and dialogues were written by Ilangovan while Subrahmanyam himself handled the screenplay. Principal photography for the film took place at Neptune Studios. One of the film's associate directors was L. Krishnan, who later went on to become a prominent filmmaker in Malaysian cinema and earned the Datuk honorific.

== Soundtrack ==
S. V. Venkatraman was in charge of the music and score for Gokuladasi while the songs' lyrics were written by Papanasam Sivan and Rajagopal Iyer.

== Reception ==
Film historian Randor Guy notes that Gokuladasi is "remembered for the pleasing music, song and dance numbers by the Travancore Sisters and impressive performances by Rajamma, Honnappa Bhagavathar and T. R. Ramachandran." The film did not perform well at the box office.
