= Udumalai Narayana Kavi =

Indian poet (1899–1981)

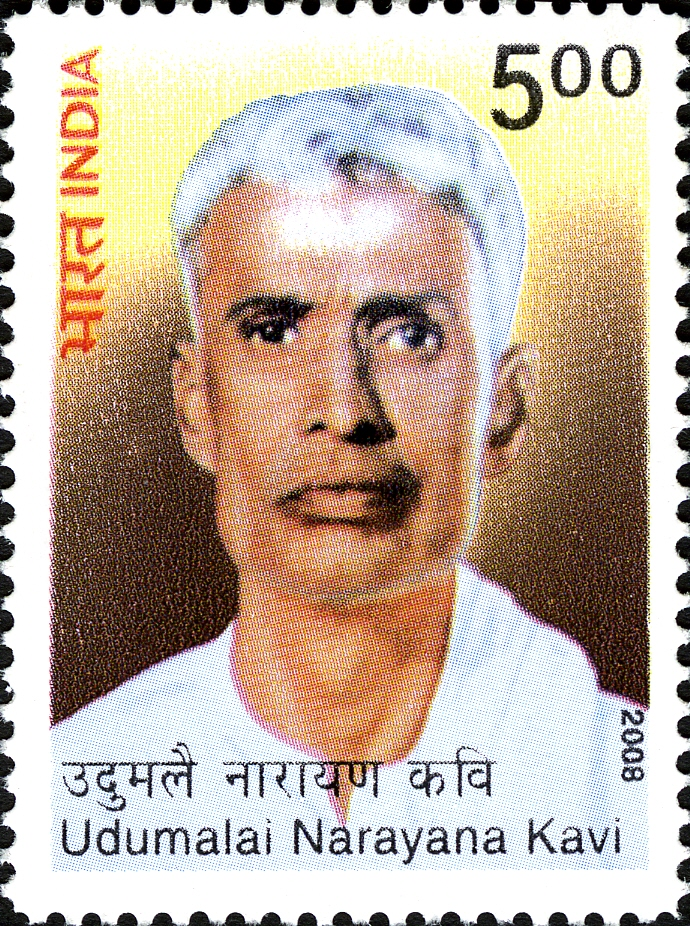
- Kavi on a 2008 Indian stamp
- Born: Narayanaswamy; 25 September 1899; Poolavadi, Madras Presidency, British India
- Died: 23 May 1981 (aged 81)
- Occupation: Poet

Udumalai Narayana Kavi (25 September 1899 – 23 May 1981) was an Indian poet and lyricist known for his work in Tamil films.

== Early life ==
Udumalai Narayana was born on 25 September 1899 in Poolavadi, a small village in Udumalaipettai taluk, Tiruppur district, Tamil Nadu, India. His parents died when he was very young and poverty deprived him of school. With the help of his brother, he made a managed a meagre living selling matchboxes in nearby villages. Even when young he had a keen interest in play and music. He initially started off acting in plays at the local temple and then got connected with some leading play groups in Tamil Nadu. Today's Kollywood is an amalgamation of several of those play groups.

== Songwriting ==
He is best known for writing several lyrics that were used in the freedom movement in his early days and between 1950 and 1972. He wrote lyrics for several Tamil movies. Many movies that Narayana Kavi wrote lyrics for in 1940s and 1950s were box office hits; thee include Velaikari, Nallathambi, Poompuhar, Parasakthiand Manohara. He was affectionately known as "Paguththarivu Kaviraayar" or simply "Kaviraayar" in the movie industry. He was also associated with N. S. Krishnan the famous comedian in the 1940s. For the Manohara (1954)movie, he was paid 15,000 rupees per song, then considered as the highest amount paid for a lyricist. Kavi wrote lyrics mostly for actor P.U. Chinnappa, while Papanasam sivam contributed lyrics for actor M.K.Thiyagaraja bhagavathar. A. Maruthakasi, a junior lyricist for Tamil movies had considered Kavi, as his mentor.

== Filmography ==
1. Kannagi (1942)
2. Tamizhariyum Perumal (1942)
3. Kubera Kuchela (1943)
4. Vidyapathi (1946)
5. Vikatayogi (1946)
6. Paithiyakkaran (1947)
7. Rajakumari (1947)
8. Krishna Bakthi (1949)
9. Nallathambi (1949)
10. Pavalakodi (1949)
11. Velaikkaari (1949)
12. Parijatham (1950)
13. Vijayakumari (1950)
14. Manamagal (1951)
15. Marmayogi (1951)
16. Vanasundari (1951)
17. Panam (1952)
18. Parasakthi (1952)
19. Devadas (1953)
20. Marumagal (1953)
21. Ponni (1953)
22. Manohara (1954)
23. Penn (1954)
24. Ratha Kanneer (1954)
25. Sorgavasal (1954)
26. Thookku Thookki (1954)
27. Chella Pillai (1955)
28. Doctor Savithri (1955)
29. Kaveri (1955)
30. Mangaiyar Thilakam (1955)
31. Mudhal Thethi (1955)
32. Needhipathi (1955)
33. Aasai (1956)
34. Amara Deepam (1956)
35. Madurai Veeran (1956)
36. Mathar Kula Manickam (1956)
37. Rangoon Radha (1956)
38. Engal Veettu Mahalakshmi (1957)
39. Karpukkarasi (1957)
40. Bommai Kalyanam (1958)
41. Mangalya Bhagyam (1958)
42. Abalai Anjugam (1959)
43. Amudhavalli (1959)
44. Mamiyar Mechina Marumagal (1959)
45. Manjal Mahimai (1959)
46. Nalla Theerpu (1959)
47. Pudhumai Penn (1959)
48. Thaai Magalukku Kattiya Thaali (1959)
49. Thanga Padhumai (1959)
50. Chavukkadi Chandrakantha (1960)
51. Deivapiravi (1960)
52. Pattaliyin Vetri (1960)
53. Raja Desingu (1960)
54. Arasilangkumari (1961)
55. Chittoor Rani Padmini (1963)
56. Poompuhar (1964)
57. Chitthi (1966)
58. Vivasayee (1967)
59. Aathi Parasakthi (1971)
60. Kurathi Magan (1972)
61. Dasavatharam (1976)

== Respect ==
In respect for his contribution to Tamil and its people, the government of Tamil Nadu has erected a memorial for him at Udumalaipettai. What made Narayana Kavi very popular was his ability to use simple language that could be understood even by general public. He died in 1981.
