= Lalitha (actress) =

Indian actress and dancer

- Born: Lalithambika; 21 January 1930; Thiruvananthapuram, Travancore, India (Now in Kerala)
- Died: 1982 (aged 51–52); Alappuzha, Kerala, India
- Spouse: Sivasankaran Nair
- Parent(s): Thangappan Pillai; Saraswathi Amma
- Relatives: Shobana (niece); Ambika Sukumaran; Vineeth (nephew); Sukumari (cousin)
- Family: Padmini (sister); Ragini (sister); Krishna (grandson)

Lalitha (21 January 1930 – 1982) was an Indian actress and dancer. She was the eldest of the three "Travancore Sisters"—Lalitha, Padmini, and Ragini. She started her acting career in the 1948 Tamil film Adhithan Kanavu and acted in movies of different Indian languages including Hindi, Malayalam, Tamil and Telugu. She entered films before her two sisters, concentrating more on Malayalam films, and was mostly cast in vamp roles.

== Personal life ==
She was born to Thangappan Pillai and Saraswathi Amma on 21 January 1930 at Thiruvananthapuram. She is the aunt of actress Shobana. Malayalam actress Ambika Sukumaran is her relative. Actress Sukumari was the trio's maternal first cousin. Malayalam actor Krishna is her grandson.

== Partial filmography ==
=== Malayalam ===
- Prasanna (1950)
- Chandrika (1950) as Dancer
- Amma (1952) as Saradha
- Kaanchana (1952) as Kaanchana
- Ponkathir (1953) as Radha

=== Tamil ===
- Kannika (1947) .....Shiva
- Adhithan Kanavu (1948) ... Pushumarasura
- Mohini (1948)
- Bhojan (1948)
- Gokuladasi (1948)
- Vedhala Ulagam (1948)
- Gnana Soundari (1948)
- Bhaktha Jana (1948) .... Kubja
- Vazhkai (1949)
- Deva Manohari (1949)
- Kanniyin Kaadhali (1949)
- Laila Majnu (1949)
- Maayavathi (1949)
- Geethagandhi (1949)
- Pavalakkodi (1949)
- Naatiya Rani (1949)
- Mangayarkarasi (1949)
- Velaikkari (1949)
- Vinothini (1949)
- Chandrika (1950)
- Ezhai Padum Padu (1950) .... Angela
- Manthiri Kumari (1950)
- Ponmudi (1950)
- Ithaya Geetham (1950)
- Krishna Vijayam (1950) .... Gopika
- Vijayakumari (1950)
- Marudhanaattu Ilavarasi (1950)
- Parijatham (1950)
- Digambara Samiyar (1950)
- Singari (1951)
- Sudharshan (1951)
- Manamagal (1951) .... Vijaya
- Or Iravu (1951) .... Shyamala
- Devagi (1951)
- Vanasundari (1951)
- Dharma Devatha (1952) .... Bijile
- Andhaman Kaidhi (1952)
- Amma (1952) ... Saradha
- Anbu (1952) ... Reeta
- Amarakavi (1952)
- Kanchana (1952) ... Kanchana
- Marumagal (1953) ... Usha
- Ponni (1953) ... Ponni
- Devadas (1953) .... Chandramukhi
- Ulagam (1953)
- Thookku Thookki (1954) .... Prema
- Kanavu (1954)
- Vaira Maalai (1954)
- Sugam Enge (1954)
- Valliyin Selvan (1955) ... Vathsala
- Menaka (1955)
- Kanavaney Kankanda Deivam (1955) .... Nagarani
- Kaveri (1955) .... Amudha
- Ulagam Palavidham (1955) .... Indra
- Rajakumari (1955)
- Nalla Thangai (1955)
- Ellam Inba Mayam (1955) .... Guest role
- Madurai Veeran (1956)
- Rajarajan (1957) ... Priyamohini
- Pudhu Vazhvu (1957)
- Kanniyin Sabatham (1958)
- Thanga Padhumai (1959)
- Baghdad Thirudan (1960)
- Senthamarai (1962)
- Ellorum Vazhavendum (1962)
- 1967 Nil N S Krishnan (1967)

=== Telugu ===
- Vijaya Gauri (1955)
- Ammalakkalu (1953) ... Usha
- Devadasu (1953) ... Chandramukhi
- Dharma Devatha (1952)
- Kanchana (1952)...Kanchana
- Navvite Navaratnalu (1951)
- Chandravanka (1951)
- Jeevitham (1950)
- Thirugubatu (1950)
- Beedala Patlu (1950) ... Angela
- Laila Majnu (1949)

=== Hindi ===
- Kalpana (1948)
- Kalpana (1960)

=== Sinhala ===
- Surasena (1957)
- Kapati Arakshakaya (1948) (Choreography only)

== See also ==
- Travancore Sisters
