= S. V. Sahasranamam =

Indian actor

- Sahasranamam as seen in Policekaran Magal (1962)
- Born: Singanallur Venkataramana Iyer Sahasranamam; 29 November 1913; Singanallur, Coimbatore
- Died: 19 February 1988 (aged 74)
- Other name: S. V. S.
- Occupations: Actor, director
- Years active: 1935–1988
- Children: 5

Singanallur Venkataramana Iyer Sahasranamam (29 November 1913 – 19 February 1988), also known as S. V. S., was an Indian actor and director. Primarily a theatre actor, he also worked in over 200 films, mainly in Tamil cinema.

== Early life ==
Sahasranamam was born on 29 November 1913 at Singanallur. He was the fourth child born to Venkatraman and Parvathi. Because of his interest in acting, he left his home at an early age to join the Madurai Sri Balashanmuganandha Sabha, a popular theatre group, which was later renamed T. K. S. Nataka Sabha.

== Career ==
Several years after he joined T. K. S. Nataka Sabha, Sahasranamam started his own theatre group titled "Seva Stage". With that, he staged several popular plays such as Kangal, Irulum Oliyum and Vadivelu Vaathiyar. These plays were later adapted into feature films and were commercially successful. He also adapted the novels of writers such as B. S. Ramiah, T. Janakiraman and Ku Pa Rajagopalan, and made them into feature films. Although Sahasranamam was also successful in cinema, having acted in over 200 films since debuting in that field with Menaka (1935), he always considered theatre his main interest.

== Awards ==
Sahasranamam won the Sangeet Natak Akademi Award for Acting (Tamil) in 1967, and received the Sangeetha Kalasikhamani award in 1980 by the Indian Fine Arts Society, Chennai.

== Personal life ==
Sahasranamam's son S. V. S. Kumar is also an actor.

== Illness and death ==
Between March 1974 and February 1988, Sahasranamam suffered at least five heart attacks. He had chosen the artists for the play Nandha Vilakku, authored by novelist/dramatist Krishnamani, and asked them to come for a rehearsal on 21 February. But he suffered a heart attack on 19 February 1988 and died at 4:30 pm IST.

== Partial filmography ==
Year	Film	Role	Ref.
1935	Menaka		
1937	Balamani	Ranjit Singh	
1941	Alibabavum 40 Thirudargalum		
1942	Kannagi	Paramasivan	
1942	Naveena Vikramadityan		
1944	Mahamaya	Jayapalan	
1944	Prabhavathi	Shiva	
1944	Rajarajeswari		
1944	Poompavai	Shiva	
1947	Paithiyakkaran		
1949	Nallathambi	Bhoopati	
1949	Vaazhkai	Murthi	
1951	Marmayogi		
1951	Manamagal	Male protagonist	
1951	Singari		
1952	Parasakthi	Chandrasekaran	
1953	Kangal		
1953	Rohini		
1954	Edhir Paradhathu	Gopu	
1955	Needhipathi		
1955	Valliyin Selvan	Manoharam Pillay	
1956	Kula Deivam	Muthaiyya	
1956	Naane Raja		
1958	Sengottai Singam	Dharmalingam	
1959	Alli Petra Pillai		
1959	Kalaivaanan	Viswanathan	
1959	Kan Thiranthathu	Karuppaiah	
1959	Naalu Veli Nilam		
1959	Nalla Theerpu		
1959	Orey Vazhi		
1959	President Panchaksharam	District Board president	
1959	Uthami Petra Rathinam		
1962	Policekaran Magal		
1962	Padithal Mattum Podhuma		
1963	Kunkhumam	Justice Somanathan	
1963	Vanambadi		
1963	Anandha Jodhi	Muthiah Pillai	
1964	Kai Kodutha Deivam	Mahadevan's lawyer	
1964	Alli	Somu	
1965	Poojaikku Vandha Malar	Sivanesan	
1965	Santhi	Doctor	
1966	Yaarukkaga Azhudhaan	Naidu	
1966	Marakka Mudiyumaa?		
1966	Sadhu Mirandal	Bank Manager	
1966	Avan Pithana?	Nallaiah Raja	
1966	Selvam		
1967	Kan Kanda Deivam	Judge	
1968	Jeevanaamsam		
1968	Kuzhanthaikkaga		
1968	Thillana Mohanambal	Shaktivelu	
1969	Iru Kodugal		
1969	Soappu Seeppu Kannadi		
1971	Punnagai		
1971	Sabatham	Nalli Muthu	
1972	Nawab Naarkali	Thandavam	
1974	Urimaikural		
1976	Dasavatharam	King Mahabali	
1979	Gnana Kuzhandhai		

== Bibliography ==
- Rajadhyaksha, Ashish; Willemen, Paul (1998) [1994]. Encyclopaedia of Indian Cinema. British Film Institute and Oxford University Press. ISBN 0-19-563579-5.
