= Samudrala Sr. =

Indian writer (1902–1968)

- Born: Samudrala Venkata Raghavacharyulu; 19 July 1902; Repalle, British India
- Died: 16 March 1968 (aged 65)
- Occupation: Screenwriter
- Years active: 1937–1968
- Children: Samudrala Jr. grandson {samudrala srinivaas

Samudrala Raghavacharya (19 July 1902 – 16 March 1968), also known as Samudrala Sr., was an Indian screenwriter, lyricist, playback singer, director, and producer known for his works in Telugu cinema. Samudrala Senior made his screen debut in 1937, and was known for his collaborations with Ghantasala.

== Personal life ==
Samudrala Raghavacharya was born in 1902, in Pedapulivarru, Repalle Taluk, Andhra Pradesh, India.

== Filmography ==
=== Writer ===
1. Kanakatara (1937) (debut) (dialogues and lyrics)
2. Gruhalakshmi (1938)
3. Vande Mataram (1939) (dialogue)
4. Sumangali (1940) (dialogue)
5. Devata (1941) (dialogue)
6. Bhakta Potana (1942) (story and dialogue)
7. Chenchu Lakshmi (1943) (story and dialogue)
8. Garuda Garvabhangam (1943) (dialogue)
9. Palnati Yudham (1947) (dialogue) (screen adaptation)
10. Ratnamala (1947)
11. Yogi Vemana (1947)
12. Mana Desam (1949) (dialogue)
13. Laila Majnu (1949/I) (adaptation) (dialogue)
14. Swapna Sundari (1950)
15. Navvite Navaratnalu (1951)
16. Chandirani (1953)
17. Bratuku Theruvu (1953) (dialogue) (story)
18. Devadasu (1953) (dialogue and screen adaptation)
19. Vipra Narayana (1954) (dialogues and lyrics)
20. Donga Ramudu (1955) (lyrics)
21. Jayasimha (1955) (dialogue) (story)
22. Jayam Manade (1956) (dialogue) (story)
23. Kanakatara (1956)
24. Sarangadhara (1957) (adaptation) (dialogue)
25. Vinayaka Chaviti (1957)
26. Bhookailas (1958)
27. Seetarama Kalyanam (1960) (dialogue)
28. Batasari (1961) (screen adaptation, dialogues and lyrics)
29. Lava Kusa (1963)
30. Nartanasala (1963) (adaptation) (dialogue)
31. Babruvahana (1964) (dialogue) (story)
32. Pandava Vanavasam (1965)
33. Sri Krishna Pandaveeyam (1966)
34. Bhakta Prahlada (1967)
35. Sri Krishnavataram (1967)
36. Sree Ramakatha (1968)
37. Veeranjaneya (1968)

=== Director ===
1. Babruvahana (1964)
2. Bhakta Raghunath (1960)
3. Vinayaka Chaviti (1957)

=== Producer ===
1. Devadasu (1953) (producer)
2. Shanti (1952) (producer)
3. Strisahasam (1951/I) (producer)

=== Playback singer ===
1. Bhakta Raghunath (1960) (playback singer)
