= Lists of Indian films =

This is a list of films produced by the Indian film industry.

== General ==
- List of most expensive Indian films
- List of highest-grossing Indian films
- List of highest-grossing Indian films in overseas markets
- List of highest-grossing Indian animated films
- List of highest-grossing Indian Bengali films
- List of Kokborok-language films
- List of silent films from South India
- List of Indian films of 1988
- List of Indian films of 1991
- List of Indian films of 2010
- List of Indian films of 2015
- List of Indian films of 2016
- List of Indian films of 2017
- List of Indian films of 2018
- List of Indian films of 2019
- List of Indian films of 2020
- List of Indian films of 2021
- List of Indian films of 2022
- List of Indian films of 2023
- List of Indian films of 2024
- List of Indian films of 2025
- List of Indian films of 2026

== Assamese ==
- List of Assamese films before 2000
- List of Assamese films of the 2000s
- List of Assamese films of the 2010s
- List of Assamese films of the 2020s

== Bengali ==
- List of silent Indian Bengali films
- List of Indian Bengali films before 1950
- List of Indian Bengali films of the 1950s
- List of Indian Bengali films of the 1960s
- List of Indian Bengali films of the 1970s
- List of Indian Bengali films of the 1980s
- List of Indian Bengali films of the 1990s
- List of Indian Bengali films of the 2000s
- List of Indian Bengali films of the 2010s:
- 2010
- 2011
- 2012
- 2013
- 2014
- 2015
- 2016
- 2017
- 2018
- 2019
- List of Indian Bengali films of the 2020s:
- 2020
- 2021
- 2022
- 2023
- 2024
- 2025
- 2026
- 2027

== Bhojpuri ==
- List of Bhojpuri films of 2018
- List of Bhojpuri films of 2019
- List of Bhojpuri films of 2020
- List of Bhojpuri films of 2021
- List of Bhojpuri films of 2022
- List of Bhojpuri films of 2023
- List of Bhojpuri films of 2024
- List of Bhojpuri films of 2025

== Gujarati ==
- List of Gujarati films
- List of Gujarati films of 2014
- List of Gujarati films of 2015
- List of Gujarati films of 2016
- List of Gujarati films of 2017
- List of Gujarati films of 2018
- List of Gujarati films of 2019
- List of Gujarati films of 2020
- List of Gujarati films of 2021
- List of Gujarati films of 2022
- List of Gujarati films of 2023
- List of Gujarati films of 2024
- List of Gujarati films of 2025
- List of Gujarati films of 2026

== Hindi ==
- 1920
- 1921
- 1922
- 1923
- 1924
- 1925
- 1926
- 1927
- 1928
- 1929
- 1930
- 1931
- 1932
- 1933
- 1934
- 1935
- 1936
- 1937
- 1938
- 1939
- 1940
- 1941
- 1942
- 1943
- 1944
- 1945
- 1946
- 1947
- 1948
- 1949
- 1950
- 1951
- 1952
- 1953
- 1954
- 1955
- 1956
- 1957
- 1958
- 1959
- 1960
- 1961
- 1962
- 1963
- 1964
- 1965
- 1966
- 1967
- 1968
- 1969
- 1970
- 1971
- 1972
- 1973
- 1974
- 1975
- 1976
- 1977
- 1978
- 1979
- 1980
- 1981
- 1982
- 1983
- 1984
- 1985
- 1986
- 1987
- 1988
- 1989
- 1990
- 1991
- 1992
- 1993
- 1994
- 1995
- 1996
- 1997
- 1998
- 1999
- 2000
- 2001
- 2002
- 2003
- 2004
- 2005
- 2006
- 2007
- 2008
- 2009
- 2010
- 2011
- 2012
- 2013
- 2014
- 2015
- 2016
- 2017
- 2018
- 2019
- 2020
- 2021
- 2022
- 2023
- 2024
- 2025
- 2026
- 2027
- 2028

== Kannada ==
- List of Kannada films of the 1930s
- List of Kannada films of the 1940s
- List of Kannada films of the 1950s
- 1960
- 1961
- 1962
- 1963
- 1964
- 1965
- 1966
- 1967
- 1968
- 1969
- 1970
- 1971
- 1972
- 1973
- 1974
- 1975
- 1976
- 1977
- 1978
- 1979
- 1980
- 1981
- 1982
- 1983
- 1984
- 1985
- 1986
- 1987
- 1988
- 1989
- 1990
- 1991
- 1992
- 1993
- 1994
- 1995
- 1996
- 1997
- 1998
- 1999
- 2000
- 2001
- 2002
- 2003
- 2004
- 2005
- 2006
- 2007
- 2008
- 2009
- 2010
- 2011
- 2012
- 2013
- 2014
- 2015
- 2016
- 2017
- 2018
- 2019
- 2020
- 2021
- 2022
- 2023
- 2024
- 2025
- 2026

== Malayalam ==
- List of Malayalam films before 1960
- 1960
- 1961
- 1962
- 1963
- 1964
- 1965
- 1966
- 1967
- 1968
- 1969
- 1970
- 1971
- 1972
- 1973
- 1974
- 1975
- 1976
- 1977
- 1978
- 1979
- 1980
- 1981
- 1982
- 1983
- 1984
- 1985
- 1986
- 1987
- 1988
- 1989
- 1990
- 1991
- 1992
- 1993
- 1994
- 1995
- 1996
- 1997
- 1998
- 1999
- 2000
- 2001
- 2002
- 2003
- 2004
- 2005
- 2006
- 2007
- 2008
- 2009
- 2010
- 2011
- 2012
- 2013
- 2014
- 2015
- 2016
- 2017
- 2018
- 2019
- 2020
- 2021
- 2022
- 2023
- 2024
- 2025
- 2026
- 2027

== Marathi ==
- List of Marathi films of 1910–1919
- 1920
- 1921
- 1922
- 1923
- 1924
- 1925
- 1926
- 1927
- 1928
- 1929
- 1930
- 1931
- 1932
- 1933
- 1934
- 1935
- 1936
- 1937
- 1938
- 1939
- 1940
- 1941
- 1942
- 1943
- 1944
- 1945
- 1946
- 1947
- 1948
- 1949
- 1950
- 1951
- 1952
- 1953
- 1954
- 1955
- 1956
- 1957
- 1958
- 1959
- 1960
- 1961
- 1962
- 1963
- 1964
- 1965
- 1966
- 1967
- 1968
- 1969
- 1970
- 1971
- 1972
- 1973
- 1974
- 1975
- 1976
- 1977
- 1978
- 1979
- 1980
- 1981
- 1982
- 1983
- 1984
- 1985
- 1986
- 1987
- 1988
- 1989
- 1990
- 1991
- 1992
- 1993
- 1994
- 1995
- 1996
- 1997
- 1998
- 1999
- 2000
- 2001
- 2002
- 2003
- 2004
- 2005
- 2006
- 2007
- 2008
- 2009
- 2010
- 2011
- 2012
- 2013
- 2014
- 2015
- 2016
- 2017
- 2018
- 2019
- 2020
- 2021
- 2022
- 2023
- 2024
- 2025
- 2026

== Meitei ==
- List of Meitei-language films
- List of Meitei-language films of 2013
- List of Meitei-language films of 2018
- List of Meitei-language films of 2019
- List of Meitei-language films of 2021
- List of Meitei-language films of 2022
- List of Meitei-language films of 2023
- List of Meitei-language films of 2024
- List of Meitei-language films of 2025
- List of Meitei-language films of 2026

== Odia ==
- 1936
- 1949
- 1950
- 1951
- 1953
- 1954
- 1956
- 1959
- 1960
- 1961
- 1962
- 1963
- 1964
- 1965
- 1966
- 1967
- 1968
- 1969
- 1970
- 1971
- 1972
- 1973
- 1974
- 1975
- 1976
- 1977
- 1978
- 1979
- 1980
- 1981
- 1982
- 1983
- 1984
- 1985
- 1986
- 1987
- 1988
- 1989
- 1990
- 1991
- 1992
- 1993
- 1994
- 1995
- 1996
- 1997
- 1998
- 1999
- 2000
- 2001
- 2002
- 2003
- 2004
- 2005
- 2006
- 2007
- 2008
- 2009
- 2010
- 2011
- 2012
- 2013
- 2014
- 2015
- 2016
- 2017
- 2018
- 2019
- 2020
- 2021
- 2022
- 2023
- 2024
- 2025
- 2026

== Punjabi ==
- List of Indian Punjabi films before 1970
- List of Indian Punjabi films of the 1970s
- List of Indian Punjabi films of the 1980s
- List of Indian Punjabi films of the 1990s
- List of Indian Punjabi films of the 2000s
- List of Punjabi films of the 2010s:
- 2010
- 2011
- 2012
- 2013
- 2014
- 2015
- 2016
- 2017
- 2018
- 2019
- List of Punjabi films of the 2020s:
- 2020
- 2021
- 2022
- 2023
- 2024
- 2025

== Tamil ==
- 1940
- 1941
- 1942
- 1943
- 1944
- 1945
- 1946
- 1947
- 1948
- 1949
- 1950
- 1951
- 1952
- 1953
- 1954
- 1955
- 1956
- 1957
- 1958
- 1959
- 1960
- 1961
- 1962
- 1963
- 1964
- 1965
- 1966
- 1967
- 1968
- 1969
- 1970
- 1971
- 1972
- 1973
- 1974
- 1975
- 1976
- 1977
- 1978
- 1979
- 1980
- 1981
- 1982
- 1983
- 1984
- 1985
- 1986
- 1987
- 1988
- 1989
- 1990
- 1991
- 1992
- 1993
- 1994
- 1995
- 1996
- 1997
- 1998
- 1999
- 2000
- 2001
- 2002
- 2003
- 2004
- 2005
- 2006
- 2007
- 2008
- 2009
- 2010
- 2011
- 2012
- 2013
- 2014
- 2015
- 2016
- 2017
- 2018
- 2019
- 2020
- 2021
- 2022
- 2023
- 2024
- 2025
- 2026

== Telugu ==
- List of Telugu films of the 1930s
- 1940
- 1941
- 1942
- 1943
- 1944
- 1945
- 1946
- 1947
- 1948
- 1949
- 1950
- 1951
- 1952
- 1953
- 1954
- 1955
- 1956
- 1957
- 1958
- 1959
- 1960
- 1961
- 1962
- 1963
- 1964
- 1965
- 1966
- 1967
- 1968
- 1969
- 1970
- 1971
- 1972
- 1973
- 1974
- 1975
- 1976
- 1977
- 1978
- 1979
- 1980
- 1981
- 1982
- 1983
- 1984
- 1985
- 1986
- 1987
- 1988
- 1989
- 1990
- 1991
- 1992
- 1993
- 1994
- 1995
- 1996
- 1997
- 1998
- 1999
- 2000
- 2001
- 2002
- 2003
- 2004
- 2005
- 2006
- 2007
- 2008
- 2009
- 2010
- 2011
- 2012
- 2013
- 2014
- 2015
- 2016
- 2017
- 2018
- 2019
- 2020
- 2021
- 2022
- 2023
- 2024
- 2025
- 2026
- 2027

== Tulu ==
- List of Tulu films of 2014
- List of Tulu films of 2015
- List of Tulu films of 2016
- List of Tulu films of 2017
- List of Tulu films of 2018
- List of Tulu films of 2019
- List of Tulu films of 2020
- List of Tulu films of 2021
- List of Tulu films of 2022
- List of Tulu films of 2023
- List of Tulu films of 2024
- List of Tulu films of 2025

== See also ==
- Category:Indian film awards
