= List of Telugu films of 1964 =

This is a list of films produced by the Tollywood film industry based in Hyderabad, India in 1964.

Title	Director	Cast	Ref.
Aathma Balam	V. Madhusudan Rao	Akkineni Nageswara Rao, B. Saroja Devi, Jaggayya, Gummadi, V. Nagayya, Relangi, Ramana Reddy, Chadalavada, Suryakantham, Kannamba, Hemalatha, Girija	
Amara Shilpi Jakkanna	B. S. Ranga	Akkineni Nageswara Rao, B. Saroja Devi, V. Nagayya, Haranath, Dhulipala, Relangi, Suryakantham, Girija, Jayalalithaa	
Babruvahana	Samudrala Sr.	N. T. Rama Rao, S. Varalakshmi, Chalam, Kanta Rao, Relangi, M. Balaiah, Mikkilineni, Mukkamala, C.S.R., Vangara, Peketi Sivaram, Raja Sulochana, L. Vijayalakshmi, Geetanjali	
Bangaru Thimmaraju	G.Viswanadham	Tadepalli Lakshmi Kanta Rao, Ramakrishna, Rajasree, Rajanala	
Bobbili Yuddham	C. Seetaram	N. T. Rama Rao, Bhanumathi Ramakrishna, S. V. Ranga Rao, Rajanala, V. Nagayya, Dhulipala, Mukkamala, Padmanabham, M. Balaiah, C. S. R., Jamuna, Jayanthi, Geetanjali, L. Vijayalakshmi	
Dagudu Moothalu	Adurthi Subba Rao	N. T. Rama Rao, B. Saroja Devi, Gummadi, Ramana Reddy, Padmanabham, Allu Ramalingaiah, Suryakantam, Sharada	
Desa Drohulu	Bolla Subba Rao	N. T. Rama Rao, Devika, Kanta Rao, Rajanala, Relangi, Ramana Reddy, Mikkilineni, Dhulipala, Shobhan Babu, Ramakrishna, Satyanarayana, Raja Babu, Sowcar Janaki, Girija, Geetanjali	
Doctor Chakravarty	Adurthi Subba Rao	Akkineni Nageswara Rao, Savitri, Jaggayya, Krishna Kumari, Sowcar Janaki, Gummadi, Padmanabham, Chalam, Suryakantham, Geethanjali, Jayanthi	
Kalavari Kodalu	K. Hemambaradhara Rao	N. T. Rama Rao, Krishna Kumari, Ramana Reddy, Padmanabham, Chalam, Prabhakar Reddy, Suryakantham, Geetanjali, Girija	
Manchi Manishi	Kotayya Pratyagatma	N. T. Rama Rao, Jamuna, Jaggayya, Gummadi, Mikkilineni, Ramana Reddy, Padmanabham, Raja Babu, M. Balaiah, Geetanjali	
Marmayogi	B. A. Subba Rao	N. T. Rama Rao, Krishna Kumari, Kanta Rao, Gummadi, Chadalavada, Balakrishna	
Mooga Manasulu	Adurthi Subba Rao	Akkineni Nageswara Rao, Savitri, Jamuna, Nagabhushanam, Gummadi, Padmanabham, Allu Ramalingaiah, Suryakantham	
Murali Krishna	P. Pullaiah	Akkineni Nageswara Rao, Jamuna, S. V. Ranga Rao, Gummadi, Haranath, Ramana Reddy, Allu Ramalingaiah, Peketi Sivaram, Suryakantham, Sharada, L. Vijayalakshmi	
Pativrata	Chitrapu Narayana Rao		
Pooja Phalam	B. N. Reddy	Akkineni Nageswara Rao, Savitri, Jamuna, Jaggayya, Gummadi, Relangi, Ramana Reddy, Mikkilineni, Peketi Sivaram, L. Vijayalakshmi, Rajasree, Hemalata	
Peetala Meeda Pelli	Ghantasala Krishnamurthy	Jaggayya, Janaki, Chalam, Krishna Kumari	
Ramadasu	V. Nagayya	V. Nagayya, Gummadi, Relangi, Ramana Reddy, C.S.R, Mudigonda Lingamurthy, Kannamba, Rushyendramani, Tanguturi Suryakumari, N. T. Rama Rao, Akkineni Nageswara Rao, Sivaji Ganesan, Anjali Devi	
Ramudu Bheemudu	Tapi Chanakya	N. T. Rama Rao, Jamuna, S. V. Ranga Rao, Rajanala, Relangi, Ramana Reddy, Mikkilineni, Santha Kumari, Rushyendramani, Suryakantam, L. Vijayalakshmi, Girija	
Sabhash Suri	I. N. Murthy	N. T. Rama Rao, Krishna Kumari, Rajanala, Ramana Reddy, Padmanabham, Geetanjali, Vasanthi	
Sri Satyanarayana Mahathyam	S. Rajinikanth	N. T. Rama Rao, Krishna Kumari, Kanta Rao, Relangi, Ramana Reddy, Chalam, Mukkamala, Allu Ramalingaiah, Prabhakar Reddy, Geetanjali, Girija	
Sri Tirupatamma Katha	B. S. Narayana	N. T. Rama Rao, Krishna Kumari, Gummadi, Mikkilineni, Ramana Reddy, Satyanarayana, Ramakrishna, Vangara, Chadalavada, Suryakantham, Chaya Devi, Rajasulochana	
Vaarasatwam	Tapi Chanakya	N. T. Rama Rao, Anjali Devi, Rajanala, Gummadi, Relangi, Raja Babu, Allu Ramalingaiah, Peketi Sivaram, Vangara, Girija, Radha Kumari, Nirmalamma	
Vivaha Bandham	P. S. Ramakrishna Rao	N. T. Rama Rao, Bhanumathi Ramakrishna, V. Nagayya, Padmanabham, M. Balaiah, Haranath, Prabhakar Reddy, Vangara, Suryakantham, Vasanthi, Radha Kumari	
