= List of Telugu films of 1953 =

This is a complete list of Telugu Cinemalu produced by the Tollywood in Hyderabad in 1953.

Title	Director	Production	Cast	Music
Ammalakkalu	D. Yoganand	Krishna Pictures	N. T. Rama Rao, Padmini, Lalitha, Relangi, Rushyendramani	G. Ramanathan; C. R. Subbaraman; Viswanathan–Ramamoorthy
Bratuku Teruvu	P. S. Ramakrishna Rao	Bhaskar Productions	Akkineni Nageswara Rao, Savitri	
Chivaruku Miguledhi Emi Unadhi	P. S. Ramakrishna Rao	Bhaskar Productions	A. Nageswara Rao, Savitri, S. V. Ranga Rao, Sriranjani Jr., Relangi, Suryakantham	C. R. Subbaraman; Ghantasala
Kitukendo Cheppave Chalaki Bullemma	P. Bhanumathi	Bharani Pictures	P. Bhanumathi, N. T. Rama Rao, S. V. Ranga Rao, Relangi, C. S. R. Anjaneyulu	C. R. Subbaraman; M. S. Viswanathan
Devadasu	Vedantam Raghavayya	Vinodha Pictures	A. Nageswara Rao, Savitri, Lalitha, S. V. Ranga Rao	C. R. Subbaraman
Gumastha	R. M. Krishnaswamy	Aruna Pictures	V. Nagayya, Pandari Bai, B. S. Jayamma, P. V. Narasimha Bharathi, R. S. Manohar, 'Friend' Ramasami, C. K. Saraswathi, M. Saroja	G. Ramanathan; V. Nagayya; C. N. Pandurangan
Kanna Talli	K. S. Prakash Rao	Prakash Productions	A. Nageswara Rao, G. Varalakshmi, M. N. Nambiar, R. Nageswara Rao, Rajasulochana, T. D. Vasantha, C. Varalakshmi	Pendyala Nageswara Rao
Kodarikam	K. Vembu; K. Ramakrishna Rao	Sri Gajanna Productions	Ramachandra Kasyap, S. Varalakshmi, Relangi, Chalam, Suryakantham, Girija	C. N. Pandurangan
Lakshmi	K. B. Nagabhushanam	Sri Raja Rajeswari Films	P. Kannamba, R. S. Manohar, C. V. V. Panthulu, Vanaja, J. P. Chandrababu, M. Saroja	M. D. Parthasarathy
Manjari	Y. V. Rao	Sri Varuna and Mahatma Pictures	C. H. Narayana Rao, G. Varalakshmi, Mukkamala, Y. V. Rao, Rukmini, Rama Sharma, Madhavapeddi Satyam	H. R. Padmanabha Sastry
Naa Chellelu	Ch. Narayana Murthy	Ashoka Pictures	Balijepalli, Amarnath, Rama Sharma, G. Varalakshmi, Chalam, Suryakala, Anasuya	C. N. Pandurangan
Naa Illu	V. Nagayya	Our India Films	V. Nagayya, T. R. Rajakumari, T. S. Balaiah, V. Gopalakrishnan, Girija	V. Nagayya; A. Rama Rao
Pakka Inti Ammayi	C. Pullaiah	East India Film Company	Relangi, Anjali Devi, Addala Narayana Rao, C. S. Rao, A. M. Rajah	Aswathamma
Paradesi	L. V. Prasad	Anjali Pictures	A. Nageswara Rao, Anjali Devi, Sivaji Ganesan, Relangi, Pandari Bai, Suryakantham	P. Adinarayana Rao
Pempudu Koduku	L. V. Prasad	Prasad Art Pictures	Sivaji Ganesan, M. Srirama Murthy, S. V. Ranga Rao, Savitri, Pushpavalli, L. V. Prasad, Surabhi Balasaraswathi	S. Rajeswara Rao
Pichi Pullayya	T. Prakash Rao	National Art Theatres	N. T. Rama Rao, Krishna Kumari, Sowcar Janaki, Amarnath, Ramana Reddy	T. V. Raju
Prapancham	S. L. Ramachandran	Society Pictures	V. Nagayya, K. Raghuramaiah, M. V. Rajamma, G. Varalakshmi	M. S. Gnanamani
Pratigna	Y. R. Swamy; H. M. Reddy	Rohini Pictures	Kanta Rao, Savitri, Rajanala, Girija, Ramana Reddy, Gangaratnam	T. A. Kalyanam
Prema Lekhalu; Dubbed from Hindi	Raja Nawathe	R. K. Films	Raj Kapoor, Nargis, Pran, Vijyalaxmi	Shankar–Jaikishan
Puttillu	Dr. Raja Rao	Raja Productions	Dr. Raja Rao, Jamuna, Mikkilineni, Ramana Reddy, Suryasri, Allu Ramalingaiah	T. Chalapathi Rao
Vayyari Bhama	P. Subba Rao	Ajantha Pictures	A. Nageswara Rao, S. Varalakshmi, Sulochana Devi, C. S. R. Anjaneyulu, Chadalavada, Gangaratnam	S. Rajeswara Rao
