= List of Telugu films of 1948 =

Complete list of films produced by the Tollywood film industry based in Madras & Hyderabad in the year 1948.

Title	Director	Production	Composer	Cast	Release
Balaraju	Ghantasala Balaramayya	Prathibha Productions	Gali Penchala Narasimha Rao; Ghantasala	A. Nageswara Rao, S. Varalakshmi, Anjali Devi	26 February 1948
Bhakta Sriyala	G. Ramakrishna Rao		Subrahmanya Devara	C. S. R. Anjaneyulu, Vemuri Gaggaiah, Rushyendramani	30 June 1948
Drohi	L. V. Prasad	Swatantra Films	Pendyala Nageswara Rao	C. Lakshmi Rajyam, K. S. Prakash Rao, G. Varalakshmi, L. V. Prasad	10 December 1948
Geetanjali	T. Hanumantha Rao	Shyamala Films	K. Prakasa Rao	Jandhyala Gaurinatha Sastry, Suryakumari, Poornima, Sriranjani Jr.	5 March 1948
Madalasa	Ch. Narayana Murthy	Sri Sobhanachala Pictures	S. Hanumantha Rao	K. Raghuramaiah, C. Krishnaveni, Anjali Devi, Sriranjani Jr.	29 May 1948
Ratnamala	Bharani Pictures	P. S. Ramakrishna Rao	C. R. Subburaman	P. Bhanumathi, Govindarajula Subba Rao, A. Nageswara Rao, C. S. R. Anjaneyulu	2 January 1948
Suvarnamala	K. Sadasiva Rao	Suvarnalata Pictures	Addepalli Rama Rao	R. Balasaraswathi, Suryanarayana, Mudigonda Lingamurthy	15 August 1948
Vindhyarani	C. Pullaiah	Vyjayanthi Pictures	S. Rajeswara Rao	Ramana Rao, Pushpavalli, G. Varalakshmi, D. V. Subba Rao	14 January 1948
