= List of Telugu films of 1942 =

This is a list of films produced in the year 1942 by the Tollywood film industry based in Hyderabad, India.

Title	Director	Cast	Production
Babruvahana	R. S. Prakash	K. S. Prakash Rao, Rushyendramani	
Bala Nagamma	C. Pullaiah	Kanchanamala, Banda Kanakalingeshwara Rao, Govindarajula Subba Rao, Pushpavalli	Gemini Studios
Bhakta Prahlada	Ch. Narayana Murthy	Vemuri Gaggaiah, C. H. Narayana Rao, M. V. Rajamma, G. Varalakshmi	Sobhanachal Productions
Deena Bandhu	M. L. Tandon	C. H. Narayana Rao, T. Suryakumari	Rupavani Production
Gharana Donga	H. M. Reddy	L. V. Prasad	
Jeevana Mukthi	T. V. Neelakantan	P. Suribabu, 'Bezawada' Rajarathnam, Kamala Kumari	Gemini Studios
Patni	Gudavalli Ramabrahmam	K. S. Prakash Rao, Rushyendramani, Surabhi Kamalabai, Vangara	Saradhi Films
Satyabhama	Y. V. Rao	Y. V. Rao, Pushpavalli, Sthanam Narasimha Rao, Adhanki Srirama Murthy	Jagadish Films
Satyame Jayam	H. M. Reddy		Rohini Pictures
Shanta Bala Nagamma	S. V. S. Rama Rao	M. Krishna Rao, Kumari	Royal Pictures
Sumati	K. B. Nagabhushanam	C. S. R. Anjaneyulu, P. Kannamba, T. Ramakrishna Sastry	Rajarajeshwari Films
