= List of Telugu films of 1954 =

This is a list of films produced by the Tollywood film industry based in Hyderabad in 1954.

Title	Director	Production	Cast	Music director
Achintya Apeksha Ratnavali	S. M. Sriramulu Naidu	Pakshiraja Studios	N. T. Rama Rao, P. Bhanumathi, Mukkamala, Relangi, Surabhi Balasaraswathi	S. M. Subbaiah Naidu
Aggi Ramudu	S. M. Sriramulu Naidu		P. Bhanumathi, N. T. Rama Rao	
Amara Sandhesam	Adurthi Subba Rao	Sahini Pictures	Amarnath, Sriranjani Jr., Padmini, Mikkilineni, Relangi	K. Prasad Rao; Kelkar
Annadata	Vedantam Raghavayya	Ashwaraj Films	A. Nageswara Rao, Anjali Devi, S. V. Ranga Rao, Chalam, Chhaya Devi	P. Adinarayana Rao
Anta Manavalle	Tapi Chanakya	Saradhi Studios	Amarnath, Krishna Kumari, V. Narasimha Rao, Jamuna, S. V. Ranga Rao, Suryakantham, C. S. R. Anjaneyulu, Ramana Reddy, Perumallu	Master Venu
Baalanandam	K. S. Prakash Rao	Prakash Productions	Relangi Satyanarayana Babu, Kundu, Turlapati Vijaya Lakshmi, Mallika, Nidadavol Jogabai, Kanda Mohan	Pendyala Nageswara Rao
Chakrapani	P. S. Ramakrishna Rao	Bharani Studios	A. Nageswara Rao, P. Bhanumathi, C. S. R. Anjaneyulu, Amarnath, Ramana Reddy, Suryakantam, T. G. Kamala Devi, Allu Ramalingaiah	P. Bhanumathi
Chandraharam	K. Kameswara Rao	Vijaya Productions	N. T. Rama Rao, Sriranjani Jr., Savitri, S. V. Ranga Rao, Suryakantam, Relangi	Ghantasala
Iddaru Pellalu	F. Nagoor	Nagoor Cine Productions	N. T. Rama Rao, Jamuna, M. V. Rajamma, C. S. R. Anjaneyulu, K. Siva Rao	T. R. Pappa; T. K. Kumaraswamy; T. A. Kalyanaraman
Jatakaphalam	R. Nagendra Rao	R. N. R. Pictures	S. V. Ranga Rao, R. Nagendra Rao, Chalam, Suryakantam, Suryakala, Surabhi Kamalabai	R. Sudharsanam
Jyothi	K. B. Tilak	Navayuga Productions	G. Varalakshmi, Ramachandra Kashyap, M. Srirama Murthy, Savitri, K. Siva Rao	Pendyala Nageswara Rao
Kalahasti Mahatyam	H. L. N. Simha	AVM Productions	Rajkumar, K. Malathi, M. Lingamurthy, Padmanabham, H. R. Ramachandra Sastry, Yellamma Devi, Rajasulochana	R. Sudharsanam; R. Govardhanam
Maa Gopi	B. S. Ranga	Vikram Productions	V. Nagayya, G. Varalakshmi, V. Narasimha Rao, Jamuna, Relangi	Viswanathan–Ramamoorthy
Menarikam	Jampana	Jampana Nandi Productions	C. H. Narayana Rao, G. Varalakshmi, Rama Sharma, Savitri, Mikkilineni, Relangi, K. Siva Rao	Pendyala Nageswara Rao
Nirupedalu	T. Prakash Rao	Gokul Pictures	A. Nageswara Rao, Jamuna, Ramana Reddy, Chadalavada, Surabhi Balasaraswathi	T. V. Raju
Palle Paduchu	B. Subba Rao	Shyamala Pictures	Mukkamala, G. Varalakshmi, Rama Sharma, Krishna Kumari, Chalam	M. S. Ramarao
Parivartana	T. Prakash Rao	Janata Pictures	N. T. Rama Rao, A. Nageswara Rao, Savitri, Allu Ramalingaiah	T. Chalapathi Rao
Peddamanushulu	K. V. Reddy	Vauhini Studios	Jandhyala Gaurinatha Sastri, M. Lingamurthy, Sriranjani, Jr., Relangi, Ramachandra Kashyap, Hemalatha	Ogirala Ramachandra Rao; Addepalli Rama Rao
Raju Peda	B. A. Subba Rao	B. A. S. Productions	N. T. Rama Rao, C. Lakshmi Rajyam, S. V. Ranga Rao, Master Sudhakar, Relangi	S. Rajeswara Rao
Rechukka	P. Pullaiah	Prathibha Pictures	N. T. Rama Rao, Anjali Devi, Devika, Mukkamala	Aswathamma
Sangham	M. V. Raman	AVM Productions	N. T. Rama Rao, Vyjayanthimala, Anjali Devi, S. Balachander, V. Nagayya, S. V. Ranga Rao	R. Sudharsanam
Sati Sakkubai	K. B. Nagabhushanam	Sri Raja Rajeswari Films	K. Raghuramaiah, P. Kannamba, S. Varalakshmi, Relangi, P. Suribabu, C. S. R. Anjaneyulu, K. Siva Rao	Ogirala Ramachandra Rao
Todu Dongalu	D. Yoganand	National Art Theatres	N. T. Rama Rao, Gummadi, T. G. Kamala Devi, Hemalata, Chalam	T. V. Raju
Vaddante Dabbu	Y. R. Swamy	Rohini Pictures	N. T. Rama Rao, Jamuna, Peketi Sivaram, Sowcar Janaki, Allu Ramalingaiah	T. A. Kalyanam
Vipra Narayana	P. S. Ramakrishna Rao	Bharani Studios	A. Nageswara Rao, P. Bhanumathi, Relangi, Rushyendramani, Allu Ramalingaiah, Sandhya	S. Rajeswara Rao
