= List of Telugu films of 1945 =

This is a list of films produced by the Tollywood film industry based in Hyderabad in the year 1945.

Title	Director	Cast	Production
Maya Machhindra	C. Pullaiah	Jandhyala Gaurinatha Sastry, P. Kannamba, Adhanki Srirama Murthy	Famous Cine Star Combines
Mayalokam	Gudavalli Ramabrahmam	A. Nageswara Rao, Santha Kumari, M. V. Rajamma, Govindarajula Subba Rao, P. Kannamba, S. Varalakshmi, C. S. R. Anjaneyulu	Saradhi Films
Paduka Pattabhishekam	K. B. Nagabhushanam	C. S. R. Anjaneyulu, Pushpavalli, Banda Kanakalingeshwara Rao, Adhanki Srirama Murthy, P. Kannamba	Sri Rajarajeswari Pictures
Swarga Seema	B. N. Reddy	V. Nagayya, P. Bhanumathi, B. Jayamma, C. H. Narayana Rao	Vauhini Studios
Valmiki	Ellis R. Dungan	Narasmiha Rao, Mani	Bama Film Productions
