= List of Telugu films of 1949 =

This is a list of films produced by the Tollywood film industry based in Hyderabad in the year 1949.

Title	Director	Production	Composer	Cast	Release
Abhisyanta Kalapam	H. V. Babu				
Dharmangadha	H. V. Babu	Swastik Films	Gali Penchala Narasimha Rao	Govindarajula Subba Rao, C. Krishnaveni, Rushyendramani, Mudigonda Lingamurthy, Suryakantham	1 October 1949
Gunasundari Katha	K. V. Reddy	Vauhini Studios	Addepalli Rama Rao; Ogirala Ramachandra Rao	Govindarajula Subba Rao, Sriranjani Jr., Kasturi Siva Rao, Santha Kumari	28 December 1949
Keelu Gurram	Raja of Mirzapur	Sobhanachala Pictures	Ghantasala	A. Nageswara Rao, Anjali Devi, A. V. Subba Rao, Lakshmi Rajyam Jr., Suryasri	19 February 1949
Laila Majnu	P. S. Ramakrishna Rao	Bharani Pictures	C. R. Subburaman	A. Nageswara Rao, P. Bhanumathi, C. S. R. Anjaneyulu, Sriranjani Jr.	1 October 1949
Mana Desam	L. V. Prasad	M. R. A. Productions	Ghantasala	V. Nagayya, C. H. Narayana Rao, C. Krishnaveni, Hemalatha, Kanchan, N. T. Rama Rao (Debut)	24 November 1949
Raksha Rekha	R. Padmanabhan	R. Padmanabhan Productions	Ogirala Ramachandra Rao; H. R. Padmanabha Sastry	A. Nageswara Rao, P. Bhanumathi, Anjali Devi, Lakshmi Rajyam Jr.	30 April 1949
