= List of Telugu films of 1946 =

This is a list of films produced by the Tollywood film industry based in Hyderabad in 1946.

| Title | Director | Production | Composer | Cast | Release date |
|---|---|---|---|---|---|
| Bhakta Tulasidas | Lanka Satyam | Sri Raja Rajeswari Films | B. Narasimha Rao | K. Raghuramaiah, Bezawada Rajarathnam, Adhanki Srirama Murthy, Rajeswari, Vangara | 10 April 1946 |
| Griha Pravesam | L. V. Prasad | Saradhi Films | Nalini Kanta Rao | L. V. Prasad, C. S. R. Anjaneyulu, P. Bhanumathi, Sriranjani | 10 October 1946 |
| Mangalasutram | D. N. Kotnis | Prabhakar Productions | P. Muniswamy | K. Prabhakar Rao, C. Lakshmi Rajyam, K. V. Subba Rao, Indira Devi | 12 December 1946 |
| Mugguru Maratilu | Ghantasala Balaramayya | Pratibha Productions | Ogirala Ramachandra Rao | A. Nageswara Rao, C. H. Narayana Rao, Govindarajula Subba Rao, P. Kannamba, Bezawada Rajaratnam, Kumari, T. G. Kamala Devi | 31 May 1946 |
| Narada Naradhi | C. Pullaiah | Jaganmani Productions | Susarla Dakshinamurthi | Mudigonda Lingamurthy, C. Lakshmi Rajyam, V. Umamaheswara Rao, Soudhamani, P. Suri Babu, Suryakantam | 6 April 1946 |
| Returning Soldier | | Victory Films | | | |
| Sethu Bandhanam | R. Padmanabhan | Jyothi Pictures | Susarla Dakshinamurthi | M. Ramana Rao, Rushyendramani, Balamani | |
| Tyagayya | V. Nagayya | Renuka Films | V. Nagayya | V. Nagayya, Hemalatha, B. Jayamma, C. Lakshmi Rajyam, Mudigonda Lingamurthy | 1 November 1946 |
| Vanarani | A. Surya | | | G. Varalakshmi | |
