= List of Telugu films of 1944 =

This is a list of films produced by the Tollywood film industry based in Hyderabad in the year 1944.

Title	Director	Cast	Production
Bhishma	Ch. Narayana Murthy	Jandhyala Gaurinatha Sastri, C. Krishnaveni, Sriranjani	Bhavani Pictures
Circus King			
Oka Roju Raju	Jyothi Sinha	Jandhyala Gaurinatha Sastri, Purnima	
Samsara Naradhi	Ch. Narayana Murthy	Madhali Krishamurthy, Bharat Sastri	Bhavani Pictures
Seeta Rama Jananam	Ghantasala Balaramayya	A. Nageswara Rao, Tripurasundari, Vemuri Gaggaiah, Rushyendramani, Parepalli Subba Rao, Kamala Kotnis	Prathiba Pictures
Tahsildar	Y. V. Rao	Y. V. Rao, C. H. Narayana Rao, P. Bhanumathi, Kamala Kotnis	Sri Jagadesh Films
