= List of Telugu films of 1952 =

This is a list of films produced by the Tollywood film industry based in Madras & Hyderabad in 1952.

Title	Director	Production	Cast	Music
Aada bratuku (1952 film)	B.A.SubbaRao	A.N.Productions	K.Raghuramaiah, Sriranjani Jr, Krishna Kumari, A.V.Subba rao	Ogirala Ramachandra Rao
Aadarsham	H. V. Babu	Subhodaya Pictures	Jaggayya, Janaki, Savitri	Aswathama
Chinna Kodalu	Ghantasala Balaramayya	Prathibha Pictures	C. H. Narayana Rao, Kumari, Govindarajula Subba Rao, Suryakantham, G. N. Swamy, Krishna Kumari, Chaya Devi	Aswathama
Chinnamma Katha	S. V. S. Rama Rao	Jeimini Productions	Govindarajula Subba Rao, Seshamamba, Kasturi Siva Rao, Krishna Kumari	Veluri Krishna Murthy
Daasi	L. V. Prasad (Supervising); C. V. Ranganatha Das	Rajyam Pictures	N. T. Rama Rao, C. Lakshmi Rajyam, Santha Kumari, S. V. Ranga Rao, Kasturi Siva Rao, Relangi, T. Kanakam	C. R. Subbaraman; S. Dakshinamurthi
Dharma Devatha	P. Pullaiah	Ragini Films	Santha Kumari, Mukkamala, Mudigonda Lingamurthy, Kaushik, Girija, Lalitha, Padmini, Relangi, K. S. Angamuthu, Baby Sachu	C. R. Subbaraman
Manavathi	Y. V. Rao	Sarvodaya Films	C. H. Narayana Rao, Mukkamala, Sriranjani Jr., Madhuri Devi, G. Varalakshmi, P. K. Saraswathi, Relangi	B. Rajinikanta Rao, H. R. Padmanabha Sastry
Maradalu Pelli	Mukkamala	M. K. M. Productions	Mukkamala, Suryakumari, Adhanki Srirama Murthy, Krishna Kumari, C. Lakshmikantam	V. Nagayya, Suryakumari
Palletooru	T. Prakash Rao	People's Art Productions	N. T. Rama Rao, Savitri, S. V. Ranga Rao, Nagabhushanam, T. G. Kamala Devi, Ramana Reddy	Ghantasala
Peda Raithu	K. B. Nagabhushanam	Sri Raja Rajeswari Films	M. Srirama Murthy, Anjali Devi, P. Kannamba, Relangi, T. P. Muthulakshmi	H. R. Padmanabha Sastry
Pelli Chesi Choodu	L. V. Prasad	Vijaya Productions	N. T. Rama Rao, G. Varalakshmi, Yandamuri Joga Rao, S. V. Ranga Rao, Savitri, Suryakatham	Ghantasala
Praja Seva	K. Prabhakar Rao	Sobhanachala Pictures	C. Lakshmi Rajyam, Kutumbarao, Prabala Krishna Murthy	M. B. Walke
Prema	P. S. Ramakrishna Rao	Bharani Studios	A. Nageswara Rao, P. Bhanumathi, Sriranjani Jr., C. S. R. Anjaneyulu, Relangi, Kasturi Siva Rao, Suryakantham, K. S. Angamuthu	C. R. Subbaraman
Priyuralu	T. Gopichand	Bharathalakshmi Productions	Lakshmikantam, Jaggayya, Krishna Kumari, Relangi, T. Kanakam	S. Rajeswara Rao; Addepalli Rama Rao
Rajeswari	R. Padmanaban	Padmanaban Creations	M. Srirama Murthy, Sriranjani Jr., Madhuri Devi, Govindarajula Subba Rao, Relangi, T. Kanakam	Ogirala Ramachandra Rao
Sahasam	Raja of Mirjapur	Sobhanachala Pictures	Prabhakar Rao, C. Krishnaveni, T. Kanakam, Prabhakara Reddy	M. B. Walke
Sankranti	C. Pullaiah	Chamria Productions	Chandrashekar, Santha Kumari, Sriranjani Jr., A. V. Subba Rao, Savitri, Kasturi Siva Rao, Ramana Rao	Aswathama
Santhi	Vedantam Raghavayya	Vinodha Pictures	Govindarajula Subba Rao, Chandra Kumari, Hemalatha, Ramachandra Kasyap, Savitri	C. R. Subbaraman
Tingu Ranga	B. A. Subba Rao	Yuva Chithra Combines	M. Srirama Murthy, S. Varalakshmi, Adhanki Srirama Murthy, Relangi, T. Kanakam	T. V. Raju, S. B. Dinakar Rao
