= List of Telugu films of 1943 =

This is a list of films produced by the Tollywood film industry based in Hyderabad in the year 1943.

Title	Director	Cast	Production
Bhagyalakshmi	P. Pullaiah	V. Nagayya, Malathi, V. Umamaheswara Rao, Kamala Kotnis, Suryakumari	Sri Renuka Films
Bhakta Kabiru	Ch. Narasimha Rao	C. S. R. Anjaneyulu	
Bhakta Potana	K. V. Reddy	V. Nagayya, Hemalatha, C. H. Narayana Rao	Vauhini Studios
Chenchu Lakshmi	S. Saundara Rajan	C. H. Narayana Rao, Kamala Kotnis, V. Nagayya, Rushyendramani	Tamil Nadu Talkies
Garuda Garvabhangam	Ghantasala Balaramayya	P. Bhanumathi, Vemuri Gaggaiah, Vedantam Raghavayya, T. Ramakrishna Sastry	Pratibha Pictures
Krishna Leela			
Krishna Prema	H. V. Babu	Gali Venkateswara Rao, Santha Kumari, P. Bhanumathi, Adhanki Srirama Murthy, Suryakumari, Hemavathi	Famous Films
Panthulamma	Gudavalli Ramabrahmam	V. Umamaheswara Rao, C. Lakshmi Rajyam	Saradhi Films
Pathi Bhakti	P. S. Srinivasa Rao	B. T. Murthy, Subhadra, M. Subba Rao, Shantha Devi	Jayanth Films
