= List of Telugu films of 1951 =

This is a list of films produced by the Telugu film industry based in Madras in 1951.

Title	Director	Cast	Production	Music	Ref.
Aada Janma	G. R. Rao	C. H. Narayana Rao, B. S. Saroja, Rama Sharma, Mudigonda Lingamurthy, Ramana Reddy, Girija, Lakshmi Prabha	Modern Theatres	S. Dakshinamurthi; G. Ramanathan	
Aakasa Raju	Jyotish Sinha	Gowrinatha Sastri, C. Lakshmi Rajyam, C. S. R. Anjaneyulu, Kumari, Adhanki Srirama Murthy, T. Kanakam	Trimurthi Productions		
Agni Pareeksha	M. N. Ramana Rao	K. Raghuramaiah, C. Lakshmi Rajyam, C. S. R. Anjaneyulu, Lakshmikantam, Kasturi Siva Rao, T. Kanakam, Relangi, Suryakantam	Sri Saradhi Films	Gali Penchala Narasimha Rao	
Chandravanka	Jithen Banerjee	K. Raghuramaiah, Kanchanamala, Adhanki Srirama Murthy, Dasari Kotiratnam, Lakshmirajyam Jr., P. Suri Babu, T. G. Kamala Devi	Sri Padmanabha Pictures	Nalam Nageswara Rao; Ghantasala; S. Kalyanaraman	
Deeksha	K. S. Prakash Rao	G. Varalakshmi, Madhavapeddi Ramgopal, Kasturi Siva Rao, Seshamamba	Prakash Productions	Pendyala Nageswara Rao	
Malliswari	B. N. Reddy	N. T. Rama Rao, P. Bhanumathi, Sreevatsa, Kumari, Rushyendramani, Doraiswamy, Vangara, Surabhi Kamalabai	Vijaya Productions	S. Rajeswara Rao; Addepalli Rama Rao	
Mangala	Chandru	Ranjan, P. Bhanumathi, Indira Acharya, T. R. Ramachandran, Suryaprabha, Doraiswamy, Surabhi Kamalabai	Gemini Studios	M. D. Parthasarathy; S. Rajeswara Rao	
Mantra Dandam	K. S. Ramachandra Rao	A. Nageswara Rao, Sriranjani Jr., C. S. R. Anjaneyulu, Surabhi Balasaraswati, Kasturi Siva Rao	Sri Gnanambika Pictures	Nalam Nageswara Rao; S. Rajeswara Rao	
Maya Pilla	R. Prakash	K. Raghuramaiah, C. Lakshmi Rajyam, Kumari, Adhanki Srirama Murthy, Kanchanamala, P. Suribabu, Kasturi Siva Rao, T. Kanakam	Prakash Shankar Pictures	S. Rajeswara Rao; C. N. Pandurangan; K. Venkatarama Iyer	
Mayalamari	P. Sridhar	A. Nageswara Rao, Anjali Devi, Kasturi Siva Rao, Raja Reddy, Surabhi Balasaraswathi, C. Lakshmikantam	Aswini Pictures	P. Adinarayana Rao	
Navvite Navaratnalu	S. Soundararajan	Krishna Kumari, Rama Sharma, Niramala Devi, Bhudevi	Tamil Nadu Talkies	Aswathama Gudimetla; G. Ramanathan	
Nirdoshi	H. M. Reddy	Anjali Devi, Mukkamala, G. Varalakshmi, C. Lakshmikantam, Kanta Rao	Rohini Pictures	Ghantasala; H. R. Padmanabha Sastry	
Pathala Bhairavi	K. V. Reddy	N. T. Rama Rao, K. Malathi, S. V. Ranga Rao, C. S. R. Anjaneyulu, Relangi, Girija, Hemalathamma Rao, Valluri Balakrishna	Vijaya Productions	Ghantasala	
Penkipilla	B. V. Ramanandam	Chandralekha, Duggirala Satyavathi, Alamuri Kumariratnam, Ammaji, Sundaramani	Radhakrishna Films	P. R. Moni	
Perantalu	T. Gopichand	C. H. Narayana Rao, C. Krishnaveni, K. Malathi, Mudigonda Lingamurthy, Relangi, C. Lakshmikantam	Vijayalakshmi Films	B. Rajinikanta Rao; Addepalli Rama Rao	
Rupavathi	K. Prabhakar Rao	C. H. Narayana Rao, Suryaprabha, Suryakantham, Rao Balasaraswathi	Swathi Films	C. R. Subburaman	
Soudamini	K. B. Nagabhushanam	A. Nageswara Rao, S. Varalakshmi, C. S. R. Anjaneyulu, P. Kannamba, Relangi, T. R. Rajani	Sri Raja Rajeswari Films	S. V. Venkatraman	
Stree Sahasam	Vedantam Raghavayya	A. Nageswara Rao, Anjali Devi, C. S. R. Anjaneyulu, Kasturi Siva Rao, Suryaprabha, Relangi, Girija	Vinodha Pictures	C. R. Subburaman	
Tilottama	Raja of Mirzapur	A. Nageswara Rao, Anjali Devi, A. V. Subba Rao, Suryaprabha, M. C. Raghavan	Sobhanachala Pictures	P. Adinarayana Rao	
