= List of Telugu films of 1958 =

This is a list of films produced by the Tollywood film industry based in Hyderabad, India in 1958.

Title	Director	Cast	Music director
Aada Pettanam	Adurthi Subba Rao	A. Nageswara Rao, Anjali Devi, Rajasulochana	S. Rajeswara Rao, Master Venu
Anna Thammudu	C. S. Rao	N. T. Rama Rao, Jaggayya, Sowcar Janaki, Rajasulochana	Ashwathama
Atha Okinti Kodale	K. B. Tilak	Jaggayya, Girija	Pendyala Nageswara Rao
Badi Panthulu	B. R. Panthulu	B. R. Panthulu, M. V. Rajamma, B. Saroja Devi	T. G. Lingappa
Bhookailas	K. Shankar	N. T. Rama Rao, A. Nageswara Rao, Jamuna, Vijaya Nirmala, B. Saroja Devi	R. Sudarsanam, R. Govardhanam
Bhuloka Ramba	D. Yoganand	Gemini Ganesan, Anjali Devi, Rajasulochana	C. N. Pandurangan
Chenchu Lakshmi	B. A. Subba Rao	A. Nageswara Rao, Anjali Devi, S. V. Ranga Rao, Pushpavalli	S. Rajeswara Rao
Dongalunnaru Jagratha	B. N. Reddy	Jaggayya, G. Varalakshmi, Girija	K. V. Mahadevan
Etthuku Pai Etthu	Tapi Chanakya	Gummadi, Balayya, Sowcar Janaki, Hemalata	Master Venu
Ganga Gouri Samvadam	V. N. Reddy	Kanta Rao, C. H. Narayana Rao, Krishna Kumari, Sowcar Janaki, Ragini	Pendyala Nageswara Rao
Inti Guttu	Vedantam Raghavayya	N. T. Rama Rao, Savitri, Gummadi, Rajasulochana, R. Nageswara Rao, Pushpavalli	M. S. Prakash
Manchi Manasuku Manchi Rojulu	C. S. Rao	N. T. Rama Rao, Rajasulochana	Ghantasala
Mundhadugu	Krishna Rao	Jaggayya, Sowcar Janaki	K. V. Mahadevan
Parvathi Kalyanam	K. Bhaskar Rao	Gummadi, Balayya, Krishna Kumari, Sandhya	Ghantasala
Raja Nandini	Vedantam Raghavayya	N. T. Rama Rao, Anjali Devi, Gummadi, Krishna Kumari, R. Nageswara Rao, G. Varalakshmi	T. V. Raju
Sobha	Kamalakara Kameswara Rao	N. T. Rama Rao, Anjali Devi, Rajasulochana	A. M. Rajah
Sri Krishna Garadi	Y. V. Rao	Jaggayya, Krishna Kumari, Amarnath, Revathy	Pendyala Nageswara Rao
Sri Krishna Maya	C. S. Rao	A. Nageswara Rao, Jamuna	T. V. Raju
Sree Ramanjaneya Yuddham	Aacharya	Kanta Rao, S. Varalakshmi, Sriranjani, Amarnath, Sandhya	Pendyala Nageswara Rao
