= Tollywood films of the 1990s =

Tollywood films of the 1990s may refer to:

- Bengali films of the 1990s
- Telugu films of the 1990s
