= List of Telugu films of 1941 =

This is a list of films produced by the Tollywood film industry based in Hyderabad in the year 1941. The films' names are arranged in alphabetical order.

Title	Director	Cast	Production
Apavadu	Gudavalli Ramabrahmam	Kalyanam Raghuramaiah, K. S. Prakash Rao, C. Lakshmi Rajyam, R. Balasaraswathi	Kasturi Films
Bhaktimala	Haribhai Raghunathji Desai	B. R. Panthulu, P. Bhanumathi, G. V. Seethapathi Rao, Mudigonda Lingamurthy	Bhaskar Pictures
Chandrahasa	M. L. Rangaiah	G. N. Swami, Suryakumari, R. Balasaraswathi	Vani Pictures
Choodamani	P. K. Raja Sandow	Pushpavalli, C. S. R. Anjaneyulu, Ch. Narayana Rao, Sundaramma	Janaki Pictures
Dakshayagnam	Ch. Narayana Murthy	Vemuri Gaggaiah, D. Sadasiva Rao, C. Krishnaveni, Bezawada Rajaratnam	Sobhanachala Pictures
Devatha	B. N. Reddy	V. Nagayya, Kumari, Mudigonda Lingamurthy, Bezawada Rajarathnam, Ch. Narayana Rao	Vauhini Studios
Dharma Patni	P. Pullaiah	Santha Kumari, U. Hanumantha Rao, P. Bhanumathi	Famous Films
Mahatma Gandhi	A. K. Chettiar	Bezawada Rajarathnam, P. Kannamba, T. Suryakumari	Hemalatha Films
Parvati Kalyanam	Ghantasala Balaramayya	Parepalli Subba Rao, Santha Kumari, G. Radha Krishnayya	Pratibha Films
Talli Prema	Jyotish Sinha	C. S. R. Anjaneyulu, P. Kannamba, Hemalatha, Kalyanam Raghuramaiah, Seshamamba	Raja Rajeswari Films
Tara Sasankam	R. S. Prakash	P. Suri Babu, Pushpavalli, Sundaramma	R. S. P. Pictures
Tarumaru	N. Jagannath	Parabrahma Sri, Hemalatha, Dr. Sivarama Krishnaiah	Vel Pictures
Tenali Ramakrishna	H. M. Reddy	S. P. Lakshmana Swamy, Parepalli Subba Rao, P. Ramatilakam, P. Ansuya, L. V. Prasad	Rohini Pictures
