= Tollywood films of the 1970s =

Tollywood films of the 1970s may refer to:

- Bengali films of the 1970s
- Telugu films of the 1970s
