= List of Tollywood films =

List of Tollywood films may refer to:

- Lists of Bengali films
- Lists of Telugu-language films
