= List of Telugu films of 1957 =

List of Telugu films produced by the Tollywood film industry based in Hyderabad in the year 1957.

Title	Director	Cast	Music director
Akka Chellelu	Amanullah Sarvabhouma	Amarnath, Sriranjani	Pendyala Nageswara Rao
Allauddin Adhbhuta Deepam	T. R. Raghunath	Akkineni Nageswara Rao, S. V. Ranga Rao, Anjali Devi	S. Rajeswara Rao, S. Hanumantha Rao
Bhagya Rekha	B. N. Reddy	N. T. Rama Rao, Jamuna, Sowcar Janaki, Relangi	Pendyala Nageswara Rao
Bhale Ammayilu	Vedantam Raghavayya	N.T.Rama Rao, Savitri	S. Rajeswara Rao, S. Hanumantha Rao
Bhale Baava	Rajanikanth	Jaggayya, Sowcar Janaki, Relangi, Girija	S. Dakshinamurthy
Dhampathyam	E. Apparao	G. Varalakshmi, Gummadi, Relangi	Ramesh Naidu
Dongallo Dora	P. Chengaiah	Akkineni Nageswara Rao, Jamuna	M. Subrahmanya Raju
Kutumba Gowravam	B. S. Ranga	N. T. Rama Rao, Savitri, P. Kannamba	Viswanathan–Ramamoorthy
M.L.A.	K. B. Tilak	Jaggayya, Savitri, Gummadi	Pendyala Nageswara Rao
Mayabazar	K. V. Reddy	N. T. Rama Rao, Akkineni Nageswara Rao, S. V. Ranga Rao, Savitri, Gummadi	Ghantasala, S. Rajeswara Rao
Nala Damayanthi	Kemparaj	P. Bhanumathi, Kemparaj, Savitri	B. Gopalam
Panduranga Mahatyam	Kamalakara Kameswara Rao	N. T. Rama Rao, Anjali Devi, B. Saroja Devi	T. V. Raju
Parasakthi	Krishnan–Panju	Sivaji Ganesan, S. V. Sahasranamam, S. S. Rajendran, Sriranjani, Pandari Bai	Music: R. Sudarsanam Dialogues: Palagummi Padmaraju Lyrics: Samudrala Sr.
Peddarikalu	Tapi Chanakya	Jaggayya, Anjali Devi	Master Venu
Repu Needhe	K. Bhaskar Rao	S. V. Ranga Rao, Jaggayya, Sowcar Janaki, Rajasulochana	Ghantasala
Sankalpam	C. V. Ranganatha Das	N. T. Rama Rao, Rajasulochana	S. Dakshinamurthy
Sarangadhara	V. S. Raghavan	N. T. Rama Rao, P. Bhanumathi, Rajasulochana	Ghantasala
Sati Anasuya	K. B. Nagabhushanam	N. T. Rama Rao, Anjali Devi, Jamuna	Ghantasala
Sati Savitri	K. B. Nagabhushanam	Akkineni Nageswara Rao, S. V. Ranga Rao, S. Varalakshmi	S. Rajeswara Rao
Suvarna Sundari	Vedantam Raghavayya	Akkineni Nageswara Rao, Anjali Devi, Rajasulochana, Kanchana	P. Adinarayan
Swayamprabha	Sobhanadri Rao	Amarnath, Sriranjani, Rajasulochana	Ramesh Naidu
Thodi Kodallu	Adurthi Subba Rao	Akkineni Nageswara Rao, Savitri, S. V. Ranga Rao, P. Kannamba	Master Venu
Vadhante Dabbu	Y. R. Swamy	N. T. Rama Rao, Sowcar Janaki, Jamuna	T. A. Kalyanam
Varudu Kavali	P. S. Ramakrishna Rao	P. Bhanumathi, Jaggayya, Amarnath, Ragini	G. Ramanathan
Veera Kankanam	G. R. Rao	N. T. Rama Rao, Jamuna, Jaggayya	S. Dakshinamurthy
Vinayaka Chaviti	Samudrala	N. T. Rama Rao, Krishna Kumari, Jamuna	Ghantasala
