= Tollywood films of the 1980s =

Tollywood films of the 1980s may refer to:

- Bengali films of the 1980s
- Telugu films of the 1980s
