= List of Telugu films of 1966 =

This is a list of films produced by the Tollywood film industry based in Hyderabad, India in 1966.

Title	Director	Cast
Aame Evaru?	B. S. Narayana	Jaggayya, Jayalalithaa
Aastiparulu	V. Madhusudan Rao	Jaggayya, Akkineni Nageswara Rao, Jayalalitha, Gummadi, G. Varalakshmi
Adugu Jaadalu	Tapi Chanakya	N. T. Rama Rao, Jamuna
Aggi Barata	B. Vittalacharya	N. T. Rama Rao, Rajasree
Bhakta Potana	Gutha Ramineedu	
Bhimanjaneya Yuddham	S. D. Lal	Kanta Rao, Rajasree
Chilaka Gorinka	Kotayya Pratyagatma	S. V. Ranga Rao, Anjali Devi, Krishnam Raju, Krishna Kumari, B. Padmanabham, Ramana Reddy, Ramaprabha
Dr. Anand	V. Madhusudan Rao	N. T. Rama Rao, Anjali Devi, Kanchana
Gudachari 116	M. Mallikarjuna Rao	Krishna, Jayalalitha, Rajanala, Mukkamala
Hantakulostunnaru Jagratha	S. D. Lal	Ramakrishna, Geetanjali
Kanne Manasulu	Adurthi Subba Rao	Krishna, Sukanya
Leta Manasulu	Krishnan–Panju	Haranth, Jamuna
Loguttu Perumallukeruka	K. S. R. Doss	Shobhan Babu, Geetanjali
Manase Mandiram	C. V. Sridhar	Akkineni Nageswara Rao, Savitri, Jaggayya, Kanchana
Mangalasutram	A. K. Velaa	N. T. Rama Rao, Devika
Monagallaku Monagadu	S. D. Lal	S. V. Ranga Rao, Haranath, Krishna Kumari
Navaratri	T. Rama Rao	Akkineni Nageswara Rao, Savitri, Jaggayya, Relangi, Gummadi
Palnati Yuddham	Gutha Ramineedu	N. T. Rama Rao, Bhanumathi Ramakrishna
Paramanandayya Sishyula Katha	Chittajallu Pullayya	N. T. Rama Rao, K. R. Vijaya, V. Nagayya
Pidugu Ramudu	B. Vittalacharya	N. T. Rama Rao, Rajasree
Potti Pleader	K. Hemambharadhara Rao	B. Padmanabham, Vanisri, Shobhan Babu, Geetanjali
Rangula Ratnam	B. N. Reddy	Chandra Mohan, Vanisri, Anjali Devi
Sangeeta Lakshmi	Giduturyi Suryam	N. T. Rama Rao, Jamuna
Shakuntala	Kamalakara Kameshwara Rao	N. T. Rama Rao, B. Saroja Devi
Sri Krishna Pandaveeyam	N. T. Rama Rao	N. T. Rama Rao, K. R. Vijaya, V. Nagayya, Gummadi, S. Varalakshmi, Shobhan Babu, Kanta Rao
Shrimati	Vijayareddy	Kanta Rao, Sarada
Sri Krishna Tulabharam	Kamalakara Kameswara Rao	N. T. Rama Rao, Anjali Devi, Jamuna, Krishna Kumari
Srikakula Andhra Maha Vishnu Katha	A. K. Sekhar	N. T. Rama Rao, Jamuna
