= Tollywood films of the 1960s =

Tollywood films of the 1960s may refer to:

- Bengali films of the 1960s
- Telugu films of the 1960s
