= List of Telugu films of 1955 =

This is a list of films produced by the Tollywood film industry based in Hyderabad in the year 1955.

Title	Director	Cast	Music director
Aada Bidda	Erra Apparao	R. Nageswara Rao, Kanchana, Pushpalatha	B. Gopalam, T. V. Raju
Anarkali	Vedantam Raghavayya	Akkineni Nageswara Rao, Anjali Devi, S. V. Ranga Rao	P. Adinarayana Rao
Ante Kaavali	K. S. Prakash Rao	Jaggayya, G. Varalakshmi, Sriram, K. Malathi	Pendyala Nageswara Rao
Ardhangi	P. Pullaiah	Savitri, Akkineni Nageswara Rao, Gummandi	B. Narasimha Rao, Master Venu
Bangaru Papa	B. N. Reddy	S. V. Ranga Rao, Jaggayya, Jamuna	Addepalli Rama Rao
Beedhala Aasthi	D. L. Ramachander	Gummandi, Jaggayya, Sowkar Janaki, Suryakantam	Master Venu
Cherapakura Chedevu	K. Bhaskar Rao	N. T. Rama Rao, Sowkar Janaki, Relangi, Rajasulochana	Ghantasala
Donga Ramudu	K. V. Reddy	Akkineni Nageswara Rao, Savitri, Jamuna	Pendyala Nageswara Rao
Jayasimha	D. Yoganand	N. T. Rama Rao, Anjali Devi, Kanta Rao, Waheeda Rehman	T. V. Raju
Kanyadhanam	B. Vittalacharya	Kanta Rao, Sowkar Janaki, Waheeda Rehman	Rajan–Nagendra; For Tamil version: M. Ranga Rao
Kanyashulkam	P. Pullaiah	N. T. Rama Rao, Savithri, Sowkar Janaki	Ghantasala
Missamma	L. V. Prasad	N. T. Rama Rao, Akkineni Nageswara Rao, Savithri, Jamuna	S. Rajeswara Rao
Pasupu Kumkuma	G. D. Joshi	G. Varalakshmi, Gummandi, Jaggayya, Sowkar Janaki	M. Ranga Rao
Rojulu Marayi	Tapi Chanakya	Akkineni Nageswara Rao, Sowkar Janaki, Waheeda Rehman	Master Venu
Santhanam	C. V. Ranganatha Dasu	Akkineni Nageswara Rao, Savitri	Susarla Dakshinamurthi
Santosham	C. P. Dixit	N. T. Rama Rao, Anjali Devi, Jamuna	Viswanathan–Ramamoorthy
Sri Jagannatha Mahatyamu	Katuri Mohana Rao	Srinadh, Y. Jogarao, Vangara, Prayaga, Saritha, Janaki, A. Kamala Devi etc.	Mallik & B. Gopalam
Sri Krishna Thulabaram	C. S. Rao	K. Raghuramaiah, S. Varalakshmi, Rajasulochana	H. R. Padmanabha Sastry
Vadina	M. V. Raman	Akkineni Nageswara Rao, Savitri	R. Sudarsanam
Vadina Gari Gajulu	Rajanikanth	Anjali Devi, Jamuna, Chalam	Ghantasala
