= Tollywood films of the 1940s =

Tollywood films of 1940s may refer to:

- Bengali films of the 1940s
- Telugu films of the 1940s
