= Tollywood films of the 1950s =

Tollywood films of the 1950s may refer to:

- Bengali films of the 1950s
- Telugu films of the 1950s
