= List of Tamil films of 1950 =

The following is a list of films produced in the Tamil film industry in India in 1950, in alphabetical order.

== 1950 ==
Title	Director	Production	Music	Cast	Release date (D-M-Y)
Chandrika	V. S. Raghavan	Sri Krishna Productions	V. Dakshinamoorthy; G. Govindarajulu Naidu	Thikkurissy Sukumaran Nair, Sethulakshmi, T. S. Balaiah, P. K. Vikraman Nair, V. N. Janaki, K. Sarangapani, S. P. Pillai	29-09-1950
Ezhai Padum Padu	K. Ramnoth	Pakshiraja Studios	S. M. Subbaiah Naidu	V. Nagayya, T. S. Balaiah, V. Gopalakrishnan, Lalitha, Padmini, Javar Seetharaman, Kumari N. Rajam	06-11-1950
Ithaya Geetham	Joseph Thaliath Jr.	Citadel Film Corporation	S. V. Venkatraman	T.R. Mahalingam, T. R. Rajakumari, T. P. Rajalakshmi, P. S. Veerappa, K. Sarangapani, T. S. Jaya	29-07-1950
Krishna Vijayam	Sundar Rao Nadkarni	Jupiter Pictures	S. M. Subbaiah Naidu; C. S. Jayaraman	N. C. Vasanthakokilam, P. V. Narasimha Bharathi, T. Premavathi, R. Balasubramaniam, Master A. L. Raghavan, Lakshmiprabha	14-01-1950
Laila Majnu	F. Nagoor	Balaji Pictures	S. V. Venkatraman	T. R. Mahalingam, M. V. Rajamma, S. V. Sahasranamam, V. N. Janaki, R. Balasubramaniam, G. M. Bashir, N. S. Krishnan, T. A. Madhuram	01-03-1950
Lakshmamma (dubbed from Telugu)	T. Gopichand	M. R. A. Productions	Balantrapu Rajanikanta Rao; Ghantasala	C. Krishnaveni, C. H. Narayana Rao, Dr. Govindarajula Subba Rao, Mudigonda Lingamurthy, Vangara, Surabhi Kamalabai	
Macha Rekai	P. Pullaiah	Sukumar Productions Limited	C. R. Subburaman	T. R. Mahalingam, S. Varalakshmi, Santha Kumari, B. R. Panthulu	11-08-1950
Manthiri Kumari	Ellis R. Dungan; T. R. Sundaram	Modern Theatres	G. Ramanathan	M. G. Ramachandran, G. Sakunthala, Madhuri Devi, M. N. Nambiar, S. A. Natarajan, A. Karunanidhi, T. P. Muthulakshmi	24-06-1950
Marudhanaattu Ilavarasi	A. Kasilingam	Govindan & Company	M. S. Gnanamani	M. G. Ramachandran, V. N. Janaki, P. S. Veerappa, M. G. Chakrapani, 'Pulimoottai' Ramaswami, C. K. Nagaratnam, C. K. Saraswathi	02-04-1950
Parijatham	K. S. Gopala Krishnan	Lavanya Pictures	S. V. Venkatraman; C. R. Subburaman	T. R. Mahalingam, M. V. Rajamma, B. S. Saroja, R. Balasubramaniam, N. S. Krishnan, T. A. Madhuram, Nagercoil K. Mahadevan, Pulimoottai Ramaswami	11-09-1950
Ponmudi	Ellis R. Dungan	Modern Theaters	G. Ramanathan	P. V. Narasimha Bharathi, Madhuri Devi, R. Balasubramaniam, Kali N. Rathnam, T. P. Muthulakshmi, M. G. Chakrapani, A. Karunanidhi, Dhanalakshmi	14-01-1950
Raja Vikrama	Kemparaj Urs	Kemparaj Productions	S. Rajam	D. Kempraj Urs, B. Jayamma, M. V. Rajamma, Pandari Bai, C. V. V. Panthulu, Stunt Somu, T. V. Sethuraman, K. S. Angamuthu	29-11-1950
Swapna Sundari	Ghantasala Balaramaiah	Vauhini Studios	C. R. Subburaman	A. Nageswara Rao, Anjali Devi, G. Varalakshmi, Mukkamala, Kasturi Siva Rao, Surabhi Balasaraswathi	
Thigambara Samiar	T. R. Sundaram	Modern Theatres	G. Ramanathan; S. M. Subbaiah Naidu	M. N. Nambiar, P. V. Narasimha Bharathi, M. S. Draupadhi, D. Balasubramaniam, Lakshmi Prabha, V. K. Ramasamy, C. K. Saraswathi	29-09-1950
Vijayakumari	A. S. A. Sami	Jupiter Pictures	C. R. Subburaman	K. R. Ramasamy, T. R. Rajakumari, Serukulathur Sama, T. S. Balaiah, Kumari Kamala, P. K. Saraswathi, M. N. Nambiar, R. Balasubramaniam	18-03-1950
