= List of Telugu films of 1956 =

This is a list of films produced by the Tollywood film industry based in Vijayawada in the year 1956.

| Title | Director | Cast | Music director |
|---|---|---|---|
| Amara Deepam | T. Prakash Rao | Sivaji Ganesan, Padmini, Savitri | T. Chalapathi Rao, G. Ramanathan |
| Ashtaaishwaryalu | E. S. N. Murthy | N. T. Rama Rao, Savithri, Jemuna | Ghantasala |
| Balasanyasamma Katha | P. Subbarao | Jaggayya, G. Varalakshmi | S. Rajeswara Rao |
| Bhakta Markandeya | B. S. Ranga | C. S. R. Anjaneyulu, R. Nagendra Rao | Viswanathan–Ramamoorthy |
| Bhale Ramudu | Vedantam Raghavayya | Akkineni Nageswara Rao, Savitri, C. S. R. Anjaneyulu | S. Rajeswara Rao |
| C.I.D. | | | |
| Charana Daasi | T. Prakash Rao | N. T. Rama Rao, Akkineni Nageswara Rao, Savitri, Anjali Devi | S. Rajeswara Rao |
| Chintamani | P. S. Ramakrishna Rao | P. Bhanumathi, N. T. Rama Rao, Jamuna, Relangi | Addepalli Ramarao, T. V. Raju |
| Chiranjeevulu | Vedantam Raghavayya | N. T. Rama Rao, Jamuna, Gummadi | Ghantasala |
| Edi Nijam | S. Balachander | Nagabhushanam, Sowkar Janaki, Gummadi | Master Venu |
| Harishchandra | Chandrasekhar Rao | S. V. Ranga Rao, Sowkar Janaki, Rajasulochana | S. Dakshinamurthi |
| Ilavelpu | D. Yoganand | Akkineni Nageswara Rao, Anjali Devi, Jamuna | S. Dakshinamurthi |
| Jayam Manade | T. Prakash Rao | N. T. Rama Rao, Anjali Devi, Sowkar Janaki, C. S. R. Anjaneyulu | Ghantasala |
| Kanakatara | Rajanikanth | S. V. Ranga Rao, S. Varalakshmi | Ghantasala |
| Melukolupu | K. S. Prakash Rao | Jamuna, C. S. R. Anjaneyulu, G. Varalakshmi, Sriram | Pendyala Nageswara Rao |
| Muddu Bidda | K. B. Tilak | Jaggayya, Jamuna | Pendyala Nageswara Rao |
| Naga Devatha; AVM Productions | K. Shankar | R. Nagendra Rao, Jamuna, Sowcar Janaki | R. Sudarsanam |
| Naga Panchami | K. Nagabhushanam | Anjali Devi, S. Varalakshmi, V. Nagayya | |
| Nagula Chavithi | Chitrapu Narayana Rao | Sowkar Janaki, Jamuna, Nagabhushanam | R. Sudarsanam, R. Govardhanam |
| Penki Pellam | Kamalakara Kameswara Rao | N. T. Rama Rao, Rajasulochana | Prasad Rao |
| Sadarama | K. R. Seetarama Sastri | Akkineni Nageswara Rao, Sowkar Janaki | R. Sudarsanam, R. Govardhanam |
| Sonta Ooru | E. S. N. Murthy | N. T. Rama Rao, Rajasulochana, Sowkar Janaki | Ghantasala |
| Sri Gauri Mahatyam | D. Yoganand | N. T. Rama Rao, Sriranjani, Jr. | Ogirala Ramachandra Rao, T. V. Raju |
| Tenali Ramakrishna | B. S. Ranga | Akkineni Nageswara Rao, N. T. Rama Rao, P. Bhanumathi, Jamuna | Viswanathan–Ramamoorthy |
| Uma Sundari | P. Pullaiah | N. T. Rama Rao, P. Kannamba, Sriranjani | Ashwathama |
