= List of Telugu films of 1967 =

This is a list of films produced by the Telugu film industry based in Hyderabad, India, in 1967.

Title	Director	Cast
Aada Paduchu	K. Hemambharadhara Rao	N. T. Rama Rao, Chandrakala, Shobhan Babu
Ave Kallu	A. C. Tirulokchandar	Krishna, Kanchana
Bhakta Prahlada	Chitrapu Narayana Rao	Rojaramani, S. V. Ranga Rao, Anjali Devi
Bhama Vijayam	Chittajallu Pullayya	N. T. Rama Rao, Devika
Bhuvana Sundari Katha	Chittajallu Pullayya	N. T. Rama Rao, Krishna Kumari
Chadarangam	S. V. Ranga Rao	Haranath, Jamuna
Chikkadu Dorakadu	B. Vittalacharya	N. T. Rama Rao, Krishna Kumari
Dwapayana Kaivalyam	Ramanna M. L.	
Devuni Gelichina Manavudu	Hunsur Krishnamurthy	T. L. Kantha Rao, Vanisree
Gopaludu Bhoopaludu	G. Vishwanathan	Jayalalithaa, N. T. Rama Rao, Vanisree
Goppavari Gothralu	A. L. Apparao	Seshagiri Rao, Indira, Anji Babu
Gruhalakshmi	Bhanumathi and P. S. Ramakrishna Rao	A. Nageswara Rao, Bhanumathi
Gudachari 116	M. Mallikharjuna Rao	Krishna, Jayalalitha
Iddaru Monagallu	B. Vittalacharya	T. L. Kantha Rao, Krishna Kumari
Kambojaraju Katha	Kamalakara Kameshwara Rao	Shobhan Babu, Rajasree
Kanchu Kota	C. S. Rao	N. T. Rama Rao, Kanta Rao, Savitri, Devika
Konte Pilla	T. R. Ramanna	
Maa Vadina	Kotayya Pratyagatma	T. L. Kantha Rao, Krishna Kumari
Nindu Manasulu	S. D. Lal	NTR, Devika
Nirdoshi	V. Dada Mirasi	NTR, Savitri
Pedda Akkayya	B. A. Subba Rao	Gummadi, Krishna Kumari, Harinadh, Chandramohan, Vanisree
Poola Rangadu	Adurthi Subba Rao	Akkineni Nageswara Rao, Jamuna, Vijaya Nirmala, V. Nagayya
Prana Mithrulu	P. Pullaiah	A. Nageswara Rao, Jaggayya
Private Master	K. Vishwanath	Ram Mohan, Kanchana
Punyavathi	Dada Mirasi	N. T. Rama Rao, Krishna Kumari, V. Nagayya, S. V. Ranga Rao, Bhanumathi Ramakrishna, Pandaribai, Haranath, Jyothi Lakshmi, Sobhan Babu, Allu Ramalingayya
Rahasyam	Vedantam Raghavayya	Akkineni Nageswara Rao, B. Saroja Devi, Kanta Rao
Sakshi	Bapu	Ghattamaneni Krishna, Vijaya Nirmala
Sati Sumathi	Vedantam Raghavayya	Kanta Rao, Anjali Devi
Sri Krishnavataram	Kamalakara Kameshwara Rao	N. T. Rama Rao, Devika, Ramakrishna, Shobhan Babu
Sri Sri Sri Maryada Ramanna	K. Hemambharadhara Rao	B. Padmanabham, Gitanjali
Stree Janma	K. S. Prakash Rao	N. T. Rama Rao, Krishna Kumari
Sudigundalu	Adurthi Subba Rao	Akkineni Nageswara Rao, Vijayachander, Ram Mohan, Pushpavalli
Ummadi Kutumbam	D. Yoganand	N. T. Rama Rao, Vanisree, Kaikala Satyanarayana, Krishna Kumari, M. Prabhakar Reddy, Savitri
Vasantha Sena	B. S. Ranga	Akkineni Nageswara Rao, Anjali Devi, Padmini
Veera Pooja	A. V. Seshagiri Rao	T. L. Kantha Rao, Kanchana
