= List of Telugu films of 1947 =

Complete list of films produced by the Tollywood film industry based in Madras & Hyderabad in the year 1947.

Title	Director	Cast	Production company	Composer	Release
Brahma Ratham	Ch. Narayana Murthy	K. Raghuramaiah, Adhanki Srirama Murthy, C. Krishnaveni, B. Jayamma	Venkatarama Pictures	T. A. Motibabu	29 October 1947
Gollabhama	C. Pullaiah	K. Raghuramaiah, C. Krishnaveni, Anjali Devi	Sobhanachala Studios	S. B. Dinakara Rao; S. Hanumantha Rao	22 February 1947
Palnati Yuddham	Saradhi Films	Govindarajula Subba Rao, P. Kannamba, A. Nageswara Rao, T. Venkateswarlu, S. Varalakshmi	L. V. Prasad; Gudavalli Ramabrahmam	Gali Penchala Narasimha Rao	24 September 1947
Radhika	Sri Chatrapathi Pictures	K. Raghuramaiah, R. Balasaraswathi, R. Padmanaba Rao	K. Sadasiva Rao	S. Hanumantha Rao	20 February 1947
Varudhini	B. V. Ramanandam	S. V. Ranga Rao, Dasari Tilakam, A. V. Subba Rao, B. Kanthamani, Koti Ratnam	Ananda Pictures	K. Bhujanga Rao	11 January 1947
Yogi Vemana	K. V. Reddy	V. Nagayya, Mudigonda Lingamurthy, M. V. Rajamma, Parvathi Bai	Vauhini Studios	V. Nagayya; Ogirala Ramachandra Rao	10 April 1947
