= Adugu Jaadalu =

- Theatrical release poster
- Directed by: Tapi Chanakya
- Written by: Samudrala Jr (dialogues)
- Screenplay by: Tapi Chanakya
- Produced by: M. Sambasiva Rao; G. Vandanam
- Starring: N. T. Rama Rao; Jamuna; S. V. Ranga Rao
- Cinematography: Annayya
- Edited by: Marthand
- Music by: Master Venu
- Production company: Nava Jyothi Films
- Release date: 29 September 1966
- Running time: 135 mins
- Country: India
- Language: Telugu

Adugu Jaadalu (transl. Footsteps) is a 1966 Indian Telugu-language philosophical film, produced by M. Sambasiva Rao, and G. Vandanamon under Nava Jyothi Films banner It stars N. T. Rama Rao, Jamuna, S. V. Ranga Rao with music composed by Master Venu.

== Cast ==
- N. T. Rama Rao as Dr. Vijay
- Jamuna as Parvathi
- S. V. Ranga Rao as Dr. Krishna
- Relangi as Padmasri Sivaramakrishna Prasad
- V. Nagayya as Doctor
- Mukkamala as Singanna
- Mikkilineni as Doctor
- Chalam as Shyam
- Surabhi Balasaraswathi as Sarada
- Rama Prabha as Kokila
- Kakarala as Dr. Ram

== Soundtrack ==
Adugu Jaadalu

Film score by Master Venu
- Released: 1966
- Genre: Soundtrack
- Length: 29:12
- Producer: Master Venu

Music composed by Master Venu.

S. No.	Song title	Lyrics	Singers	length
1	"Manase Madhugeetamai"	Sri Sri	P. Susheela	3:47
2	"Antha Kopamaithe"	C. Narayana Reddy	Ghantasala, P. Susheela	3:19
3	"Bhayamu Vadelenule"	Kosaraju	P. B. Srinivas, L. R. Eeswari	3:50
4	"Chinnoda Bullemma"	Aarudhra	Ghantasala, P. Susheela	6:44
5	"Mallelukurisina"	C. Narayana Reddy	Ghantasala, S.Janaki	4:25
6	"Moogavoyiana"	Sri Sri	P. Susheela	3:40
7	"Thoolisolenu"	Sri Sri	Ghantasala, Vasantha	3:27
