= List of Tamil films of 1944 =

A list of films produced in the Tamil film industry in India in 1944:

Title	Director	Production	Music	Cast	Release date (D-M-Y)
Baktha Hanuman	C. V. Raman	C. V. Raman	T. A. Kalyanam	M. D. Parthasarathi, V. A. Chellappa, T. R. Mahalingam, Serukalathur Sama, P. S. Govindan, K. L. V. Vasantha, M. R. Santhanalakshmi, Gnanambal, C. T. Rajakantham	25 December 1944
Bharthruhari	K. Subramaniam	Kalaivani Films & Madras United Artists Corporation	V. K. Parthasarathy Iyengar	Serukulathur Sama, B. Jayamma, G. Pattu Iyer, N. S. Krishnan, V. N. Janaki, T. A. Madhuram, Kali N. Rathnam, C. T. Rajakantham, Nagalakshmi, Kalyani, Aazhvaar Kuppusami, Pulimoottai Ramasami, E. Krishnamurthi Kunchithapaadham Pillai, M. Thiruvengadam	13-04-1944
Dasi Aparanji	B. N. Rao	S. S. Vasan, Gemini Studios	M. D. Parathasarathy & S. Rajeswara Rao	Kothamangalam Seenu, Pushpavalli, M. K. Radha, Kothamangalam Subbu, L. Narayana Rao, M. S. Sundhari Bai	16-10-1944
Harichandra	K. B. Nagabhushanam	K. B. Nagabhushanam & P. Kannamba, Sri Rajarajeswari Films	S. V. Venkatraman	P. U. Chinnappa, P. Kannamba, M. N. Nambiar, R. Balasubramaniam, M. R. Swaminathan, Yogam Mangalam, N. S. Krishnan, T. A. Mathuram	27-12-1943/14-01-1944
Haridas	Sundar Rao Nadkarni	Royal Talkies	G. Ramanathan	M. K. Thyagaraja Bhagavathar, T. R. Rajakumari, N. C. Vasanthakokilam, N. S. Krishnan, T. A. Madhuram, T. E. Krishnamachari, Pulimoottai Ramaswami, Harini, Radhabai, Pandari Bai	16-10-1944
Harishchandra; Dubbed from Kannada. First dubbed film in Tamil	R. Nagendra Rao	Pragathi Studios	R. Sudharsanam	Subbaiah Naidu, R. Nagendra Rao, Lakshmibai, J. V. Krishnamurthy Rao, M. G. Marirao, B. S. Raja Iyengar, Kamalabai, Narasimhan (credited as Master Narasimhan)	06-01-1944
Jagathalapratapan	K. S. Narayana Iyengar & S. M. Sriramulu Naidu	K. S. Narayana Iyengar & S. M. Sriramulu Naidu, Pakshiraja Films	G. Ramanathan	P. U. Chinnappa, M. S. Sarojini, N. S. Krishnan, T. A. Madhuram, M. R. Santhanalakshmi, P. B. Rangachari, U. R. Jeevarathinam, S. Varalakshmi, T. A. Jayalakshmi, T. S. Balaiah, D. Balasubramaniam, Kulathu Mani, M. S. Murugesan, P. Saradambal, M. V. Mani, Kumari Kamala, Yogambal (Yogam)- Mangalam	13-04-1944
Mahamaya	T. R. Raghunath	M. Somasundaram & S. K. Mohideen, Jupiter Pictures	S. V. Venkatraman & Kunnakudi Venkatarama Iyer	P. U. Chinnappa, P. Kannamba, M. G. Chakrapani, N. S. Krishnan, T. A. Madhuram, M. S. Saroja, R. Balasubramaniam, D. Balasubramaniam, S. V. Sahasranamam, M. K. Meenalochani, Baby T. D. Kusalakumari, T. R. Rajani, T. R. B. Rao and dance by B. S. Saroja	16-10-1944
Poompaavai	Krishnan–Panju	Leo Films	A. Rama Rao	K. R. Ramasamy, U. R. Jeevarathinam, N. S. Krishnan, T. A. Madhuram, C. S. Jayaraman	18-08-1944
Prabhavathi	T. R. Raghunath	S. M. Letchumanan Chettiar, Krishna Pictures		C. Honnappa Bhagavathar, T. R. Rajakumari, N. S. Krishnan, T. A. Madhuram, S. P. L. Dhanalakshmi, M. S. Saroja, Nagercoil K. Mahadevan, D. Balasubramaniam, R. Balasubramaniam, T. R. Ramachandran, S. V. Sahasranamam, E. R. Sahadevan, Kulathu Mani, T. V. Namasivayam, Pulimoottai Ramasami, Velayutham, M. Lakshmanan, P. A. Periyanayaki, P. A. Rajamani, A. R. Sakunthala, K. R. Chellam, Lux Beauty R. Padma, T. S. Krishnaveni, G. Rathinam	06-08-1944
Raja Rajeswari	M. L. Tandon & T. R. Sundaram	T. R. Sundaram, Modern Theatres	T. A. Kalyanam (assisted by K. V. Mahadevan as per film credits)	C. Honnappa Bhagavathar, K. L. V. Vasantha, U. R. Jeevarathinam, N. S. Krishnan, T. A. Madhuram, Serukulathur Sama, Kali N. Rathnam, S. V. Sahasranamam, M. R. Santhanalakshmi	23-12-1944
