= Bhale Ammayilu =

- Theatrical release poster
- Directed by: Vedantam Raghavayya
- Screenplay by: Vedantam Raghavayya
- Story by: Vempati Sadasivabrahmam
- Produced by: V. L. Narasu
- Starring: Savitri; Girija; N. T. Rama Rao
- Cinematography: V. Kumaradevan
- Edited by: R. Hanumantha Rao
- Music by: S. Rajeswara Rao; S. Hanumantha Rao
- Production company: Narasu Studios
- Release date: 6 September 1957
- Running time: 179 minutes
- Country: India
- Language: Telugu

Bhale Ammayilu (transl. Bravo Girls) is a 1957 Indian Telugu-language drama film written and directed by Vedantam Raghavayya. It stars Savitri, Girija, and N. T. Rama Rao. Music was jointly composed by S. Rajeswara Rao and S. Hanumantha Rao. The film was simultaneously made in Tamil as Iru Sagodharigal.

== Cast ==
- Savitri as Saroja
- Girija as Girija
- N. T. Rama Rao as Anand
- Jaggayya as Seshagiri Rao / Mr. Rao
- Relangi as Venkatramayya
- C.S.R as Subramanyam
- Dr. Sivaramakrishnaiah as Venkatadri
- Balakrishna as Neelaiah
- Peketi Sivaram as Mohan
- Chaya Devi as Mangamma
- Hemalatha as Jayalakshmamma
- Suryakala as Rathamma
- T. Ammaji as Rekha
- Baby Sasikala as Sumitra

== Soundtrack ==
Music composed by S. Rajeswara Rao and S. Hanumantha Rao.

Song title	Lyrics	Singers	length
"Gopala Jaagelara"	Vempati Sadasivabrahmam	M. L. Vasantha Kumari, P. Leela	4:54
"Chaka Chaka Janatha"	Kosaraju	Jikki	2:56
"Hai Manasu Manasu"	Vempati Sadasivabrahmam	P. Susheela	3:46
"Oho Bangaru Chilaka"	Kosarju	Jikki	3:12
"Bombay Guddalu"	Kosarju	P. B. Srinivas,	4:15
"Andala Roopamu"	Vempati Sadasivabrahmam	P. Susheela	2:53
"Madhi Uyyalalooge"	Vempati Sadasivabrahmam	Ghantasala, P. Leela	3:27
"Cheetiki Matiki"	Kosarju	P. B. Srinivas, Jikki	3:14
"Muddulolike"	Vempati Sadasivabrahmam	P. Susheela	3:18
"Dagudu Moothalu"	Vempati Sadasivabrahmam	Jikki	3:48
"Theem Thaam Thirana"	Thillana	M. L. Vasantha Kumari, T. V. Rathnam	5:17
