= List of Tamil films of 1943 =

A list of films produced in the Tamil film industry in India in 1943:

Title	Director	Production	Music	Cast	Release date (D-M-Y)
Arundhathi	M. L. Tandan & T. R. Sundaram	T. R. Sundaram, Modern Theatres	M. D. Parathasarathy & S. Rajeshwara Rao (Lyrics: Papanasam Sivan)	C. Honnappa Bhagavathar, U. R. Jeevarathinam, Serukalathur Sama	02-07-1943
Achayam (Vaarai Sena, Vamuna Therai & Thillana)					
Dhaasippen or Jothi Malar	Ellis R. Dungan	Bhuvaneshwari Pictures	Lalitha Venkatraman & S. Rajeswara Rao	T. R. Mahalingam, M. R. Santhanalakshmi, M. G. Ramachandran, N. S. Krishnan, T. A. Madhuram, R. Balasaraswathi Devi, Krishnamurthy, V. K. Das	25-01-1943/03-03-1943
Devakanya	R. Padmanaban	Padma Pictures	Palavangudi Sama Iyer	C. Honnappa Bhagavathar, V. N. Janaki, U. R. Jeevarathinam, T. R. Ramachandran, M. S. Murugesam, T. S. Jaya, E. R. Sahadevan, K. S. Angamuthu, T. V. Sethuraman, V. P. S. Mani, T. R. Rajani, M. A. Ganapathi Bhat, Joker Ramudu, Loose Arumugham, M. R. Swaminathan, Kottapuli Jayaraman, S. A. Padmanabhan, Kalyani, P. B. Srinivasan, Chakrapani Ayyangar	16-01-1943
Dewan Bahadur	T. R. Sundaram	T. R. Sundaram, Modern Theatres	T. A. Kalyanam	T. R. Ramachandran, J. Suseela, Kali N. Rathnam, C. T. Rajakantham, P. S. Gnanam	28-10-1943
Harishchandra (dubbed from Kannada)	A. V. Meiyappan	A. V. Meiyappan, AVM Productions	R. Sudarshanam	R. Nagendra Rao, Subbaiah Naidu, Lakshmi Bai	
Karaikkal Ammaiyar	C. V. Raman	Kanthan Company-C. V. Raman	Papanasam Sivan	V. A. Chellappa, K. Sarangapani, Kali N. Rathnam, T. S. Durairaj, P. Saraswathi, K. R. Chellam, T. S. Jeya, Kalyani	22-09-1943
Kubera Kuchela	R. S. Mani	M. Somasundaram & S. K. Mohideen, Jupiter Pictures	Kunnakudi Venkatarama Iyer & N. S. Balakrishnan, background music by S. V. Venkatraman, G. Ramanathan & T. K. Ramanathan	P. U. Chinnappa, N. S. Krishnan, T. A. Madhuram, Papanasam Sivan, P. S. Govindan, T. R. Rajakumari, S. R. Janaki, R. Balasubramaniam, D. Balasubramaniam, M. K. Meenalochani, Pulimootai Ramasami, L. Narayan Rao, T. S. Durairaj, Azhwar P. G. Kuppusami, T. V. Annapoorani, E. Krishnan and dance by B. S. Saroja	14-06-1943
Kumara Kulothungan & Asattupillai	R. Dwarakanath	Deccan Cineton		C. D. Kannapiran, T. R. Rajakumari, G. Gopal, S. S. Koko, M. S. Murugesan, M. R. Mahalakshmi, Sarada, M. K. Meenakshi Bai	
Mangamma Sabatham	Acharya (T. G. Raghavanchari)	S. S. Vasan, Gemini Studios	S. Rajeswara Rao	Ranjan, Vasundhara Devi, N. S. Krishnan, T. A. Madhuram and dance by B. S. Saroja	
Sivakavi	P. K. Raja Sandow & S. M. Sriramulu Naidu	Central Studios, Pakshiraja Films	Papanasam Sivan & G. Ramanathan	M. K. Thyagaraja Bhagavathar, S. Jayalakshmi, Serukulathur Sama, Thripuramba, T. R. Rajakumari, N. S. Krishnan, T. A. Madhuram	10-04-1943
Utthami	R. Prakash	Shyamala Pictures	T. P. Rajagopalan-K. V. Naidu	M. Lakshmanan, M. Lakshmi, C. V. V. Panthulu, Kali N. Rathnam, T. S. Durairaj, T. P. Rajalakshmi, T. S. Krishnaveni, C. T. Rajakantham, K. S. Angamuthu	
