= List of Odia films of 1999 =

This is a list of films produced by the Ollywood film industry based in Bhubaneshwar and Cuttack in 1999:

== A-Z ==
Title	Director	Cast	Genre	Notes
1999
Biswaprakash	Susant Misra	Sanjeev Samal, Nandita Das	Social	Participated in Shanghai International Film Festival (1999) and Cairo International Film Festival (1999).
Ei Akhi Ama Sakhi	Arabinda Pandey	Sirkant Gautam, Sasmita Pradhan		
Jai Sriram	Trupti Biswal	Antara Biswas, Siddhanta Mahapatra, Mihir Das		
Kalki Abatar	Hara Patnaik	Siddhanta Mahapatra, Rachana Banerjee, Jairam Samal		
Katha Kahiba Mo Matha Sindur	Arun Mohanty	Siddhanta Mahapatra, Aparajita Mohanty, Nikita		
Krushna Kaberi	Prashant Nanda	Rubi Nanda, Mihir Das, Hara Patnaik		
Maa Goja Bayani	Basant Sahu	Anu Chowdhury, Priyambada Roy		
Maa Pari Kie Heba	Sisir Mohan Pati	Mihir Das, Rekha Jain, Aparajita Mohanty		
Nari Akhire Nian	Sanjay Nayak	Siddhanta Mahapatra, Anu Chowdhury, Deepa Sahu, Mihir Das		
Paradesi Babu	Hara Patnaik	Siddhanta Mahapatra, Rachna Banerji, Sathi		
Prem Bandhan	Gopal Krishna	Mihir Das		
Pua Bhangi Dela Suna Sansara	Basant Sahu	Moumita Gupta, Siddhanta Mahapatra		
Rakhi Bhijigala Aakhi Luha Re		Siddhant Mahapatra, Rachana Banerjee, Mihir Das, Bijay Mohanty		
Sasu Hathakadi Bhauja Bedi	Vijay Bhaskar	Bijay Mohanty, Braja singh		
Sola Shukrabaar	Gopal Kumar Yogesh	Anita Das, Mihir Das		
Sarapanch Babu	Chakrapani	Siddhanta Mahapatra, Rachana Banerjee, Jairam Samal		
Suna Harini	Himanshu Parija	Siddhanta Mahapatra, Rachana Banerjee, Jairam Samal		
To akhi Mo aina		Siddhanta Mahapatra, Jyoti Misra, Hara Patnaik		
Tulasi	Pankaj Pani	Siddhanta Mahapatra, Aparajita Mohanty		
