= List of Tamil films of 1945 =

A list of films produced in the Tamil film industry in India in 1945.

== 1945 ==
Title	Director	Production	Music	Cast	Release date (D-M-Y)
Bhakta Kalathi	R. Padmanaban	Padma Pictures	G. Ramanathan; Lyrics: Papanasam Sivan	C. Honnappa Bhagavathar, T. V. Kumudhini, Serukalathur Sama, K. Thavamani Devi, N. S. Krishnan, T. A. Mathuram, T. R. Mahalingam	
Burma Rani	T. R. Sundaram	Modern Theatres	T. A. Kalyanam	C. Honnappa Bhagavathar, K. L. V. Vasantha, T. R. Sundaram, Serukulathur Sama, T. S. Balaiah, N. S. Krishnan, T. A. Madhuram, Kali N. Rathnam, C. T. Rajakantham and dance by B. S. Saroja	
En Magan	R. S. Mani	Central Studios	Papanasam Sivan	N. Krishnamurthi, U. R. Jeevarathinam, D. Balasubramaniam, D. V. Narayanasami, Kumari Kamala, C. K. Saraswathi, N. S. Narayana Pillai, M. M. Radha Bai, Ramanathan	03-11-1945
Kannamma En Kadhali	Kothamangalam Subbu	Gemini Studios	M. D. Parthasarathy	M. K. Radha, M. S. Sundari Bai, L. Narayana Rao, Appa Subbaiah Pillai, K. S. Angamuthu, Kulathu Mani Iyer	20-07-1945
Maanasamrakshanam	K. Subramaniam	K. Subramaniam, Madras United Artistes Corporation		S. D. Subbulakshmi, G. Pattu Iyer, V. N. Janaki, T. R. Ramachandran, Kali N. Rathnam, T. K. Sampangi, M. R. S. Mani, T. R. B. Rao, M. A. Ganapathi Bhat, V. S. Santhanam Ayyangar, R. Ramanuja Chariar, V. A. S. Mani, Master Sathasivam, Nagalakshmi and Kumari Subbulakshmi	
Meera	Ellis R. Dungan	T. Sadasivam, Chandraprabha Cinetone	S. V. Venkatraman	M. S. Subbulakshmi, V. Nagayya, T. S. Balaiah, M. G. Ramachandran, Kumari Kamala, Serukulathur Sama, K. R. Chellam, Baby Radha, Appa K . Duraiswami, T. S. Durairaj	03-11-1945
Paranjothi	B. S. Ramaiya	Shyamala Pictures	S. V. Venkatraman; Lyrics: Papanasam Sivan, Rajagopala Iyer	K. Sarangapani, V. A. Chellappa, T. P. Rajalakshmi, N. S. Krishnan, T. A. Madhuram, Kali N. Rathnam, C. T. Rajakantham	28-02-1945
Saalivaahanan	B. N. Rao	Bhaskar Pictures		Ranjan, M. G. Ramachandran, T. R. Rajakumari, K. L. V. Vasantha, N. S. Krishnan, T. A. Madhuram, M. R. Santhanalakshmi, T. S. Balaiah, Nagercoil K. Mahadevan	22-12-1944/16-02-1945
Sow Sow (Kalikala Minor, Palli Nadagam & Soorappuli)		T. R. Sundaram, Modern Theatres			
Sri Valli	A. V. Meiyappan-A. T. Krishnasamy	A. V. Meiyappan, Pragathi Studios	R.Sudharsanam & Rajagopalasharma	T. R. Mahalingam, Rukmini, T. R. Ramachandran, N. S. Krishnan, T. A. Madhuram	13-04-1945
