= Tenneti Hemalata =

Telugu writer (1935–1997)

- Born: Janaki Rama Krishnaveni Hemalata; 15 November 1935; Vijayawada, India
- Died: 1997 (aged 61–62)
- Occupation: Author
- Spouse: Tenneti Atchyutaramayya
- Writing career
- Pen name: Lata

Tenneti Hemalata (15 November 1935 – 1997), better known as Lata, is a Telugu writer from Andhra Pradesh, India. She was a prolific and influential writer who wrote about various situations through the perspective of an educated Niyogi Brahmin woman. Some of her novels, like 'galipadagaloo nitibudagalu ' raised controversies. She was said to be a liberal but her writings had a solid base of tradition too.

== Biography ==
Lata was born to Nibhanupudi Visalakshi and Narayana Rao on 15 November 1935 in Vijayawada, Andhra Pradesh. Her full given name was Janaki Rama Krishnaveni Hemalata. She had formal schooling up to fifth standard, and later studied Sanskrit, Telugu and English classics at home. She was married at the age of nine to Tenneti Atchyutaramayya, who was seven years her senior, and suffered from an incurable medical condition. Her father died at the age of 32, when her mother was pregnant with another child. The child is male(born 4-6-1944 after his fathers death), Nibhanupudi Surya Prakasa Rao (named after his grandfather) and retired as Professor in Organic Chemistry in Acharya Nagarjuna University, Guntur in 2004.

In 1955, Lata started her career as an announcer for the All India Radio station in Vijayawada. She participated in radio plays and later acted in, and wrote dialogue for, movies. Her first radio play was silaa hrudayam ("Stone Heart"), broadcast on Deccan Radio in 1952. She was also an admirer of the musician Mangalampalli Balamurali Krishna, and wrote a lyrics for some of his tunes.

Her husband's medical condition, two difficult deliveries by caesarian section (First son Tenneti Narayana Rao was born in 1956 and the second son Tenneti Mohana Vamsi in 1963), as well as financial problems caused her to reflect on philosophy of life at an early age. She mentioned in her (antharanga chitram)that she had been confronted with profound questions about life and death at an early age.

She died in 1997 at the age of 65.

== Literary career ==
In her novel, Gaali Padagalu, Neeti Budagalu (Kites and Water Bubbles), Lata depicted the cruelty that prostitutes had suffered at the hands of men and the diseases they had contracted. Despite considerable criticism for the book's content, she later discussed the same issue again in greater detail in another novel, Raktapankam.

Some of her other works, the semi-autobiographical fictions Mohanavamsi, and Antharanga Chitram, offer details about her life. In the 1980s, she wrote the book Ramayana Vishavruksha Khandana as a rebuttal to Muppala Ranganayakamma's Ramayana Visha Vruksham, itself a response to Srimad Ramayana Kalpavruksham by Viswanatha Satyanarayana. Priyathamudu was written on the life of sixth Nizam of Hyderabad, Mir Mahboob Ali Khan.

In a personal correspondence, Lata stated that, "I have written 105 novels, 700 radio plays, 100 short stories, ten stage dramas, five volumes of literary essays, two volumes of literary criticism, and one volume of Lata Vyasaalu, as well as 25 charitra kandani Prema kathalu poems."

== Partial bibliography ==
=== Novels ===
- Gaali Padagalu - Neeti Budagalu
- Rakta Pankam
- Brahmana Pilla
- Mohana Vamsi
- Neeharika
- Deyyaalu Levu?
- Pathaviheena
- Tiragabadina Devatalu
- Jeevana Sravanti
- Bhagavantudi Panchayati
- Omar Khayam
- Charithra Heenulu
- Kalam Krachina Kadapata
- Priyathamudu
- Seeta Jeevinche Vundi
- Ramayana VishaVruksha Khandana
- Vaarija
- Prema Raahityamlo Stree
- Neelineedalau
- Nati
- Edaari Puvvulu
- Mathahari
- Minister Vaani
- Announcer Krishna veni

=== Nonfiction ===
- Uhaagaanam, 5 volumes
- Antharanga Chitram
- Lata Vyaasaalu
- Ramayana Vishavruksha Khandana
- Lata Ramayanam

== Awards ==
- She was awarded the Gruhalakshmi Swarnakankanam in 1963.
- Andhra University honored her with a Kalaprapoorna doctorate.
- She was given the "Extraordinary woman award" by the government of Andhra Pradesh in 1981.
- She was a member of the Andhra Pradesh Sahitya Academy for twenty years.
