= Sri Seeta Rama Jananam =

- Theatrical release poster
- Directed by: Ghantasala Balaramayya
- Written by: Duvvuri Rami Reddy (dialogues)
- Produced by: Ghantasala Balaramayya
- Starring: Akkineni Nageswara Rao; Tripurasundari; Vemuri Gaggaiah; Rushyendramani
- Cinematography: P. Sridhar
- Edited by: P. V. Manikyam
- Music by: Prabhala Satyanarayana; Ogirala Ramachandra Rao
- Production company: Pratibha Productions
- Release date: 1 December 1944
- Country: India
- Language: Telugu

Sri Seeta Rama Jananam (transl. The Birth of Seeta and Rama) is a 1944 Indian Telugu-language Hindu mythological film, produced and directed by Ghantasala Balaramayya under the Pratibha Productions banner. The film stars Akkineni Nageswara Rao, Tripurasundari, Vemuri Gaggayya, and Rushyendramani. Music was jointly composed by Prabhala Satyanarayana and Ogirala Ramachandra Rao. The film marks the debut of Akkineni Nageswara Rao as a lead actor, and of Ghantasala as a chorus singer and in a character role. The film was a commercial failure.

== Cast ==
- Akkineni Nageswara Rao as Lord Srirama
- Tripurasundari as Goddess Seeta
- Vemuri Gaggayya as Ravana & Parasurama
- Balijepalli Lakshmikantham as Visvamitra
- B. N. Raju as Lakshmana
- T. Venkateswarlu as Dasaratha
- Parupalli Satyanarayana as Vasishta
- Parupalli Subba Rao as Janaka
- Lanka Satyam as Wizard
- Kumpatla Subba Rao as Rushi
- Koteswara Rao as Sukracharya
- Rushyendramani as Kausalya
- Kamala Kotnis as Kaikeyi
- Annapurna as Sumitra
- Kamakshi as Mandodari
- Chandrakala as Vedavati
- Vijaya as Urmila
- Sowdamini as Rambha
- T. G. Kamala Devi as Ahalya
- Ratna Kumari as Maya Rakshasi
- Anjanibai as Rushipatni
- Baby Kumari Champa as Young Seeta
- Baby Vasundhara as Young Urumi

== Soundtrack ==
Sri Seeta Rama Jananam

Film score by Prabhala Satyanarayana Ogirala Ramachandra Rao
- Released: 1944
- Genre: Soundtrack
- Producers: Prabhala Satyanarayana; Ogirala Ramachandra Rao

Music composed by Prabhala Satyanarayana, Ogirala Ramachandra Rao.

S.No	Song title	Lyrics	Singers	length
1	Vande Vande Mukunda			
2	Nunnu Janmaki			
3	Ranabheri			
4	Maakiyaana Kaadu			
5	Janakundu			
6	Baba Bahupedalamu Anadhalamu			
7	Manthanaku			
8	Nenu Nijamuga			
9	Raraa Naa Muddula			
10	Dikku Dikkkula			
11	Yenni Vartamulu			
12	Vidhi Nibhadamulai			
13	Sayranu Sayranu			
14	Karshaka Vinaoyi			
15	Rare Rare Chuthamu Rare			
16	Jai Jai Raghurama			
17	Rama Laali			
18	Chirutindi			
19	Aadudama Chelulaara			
20	Aaha Nedhanya Naitini			
21	Gurubrahma			

== Box-office ==
The film ran for 100 days at Durga Kala Mandir, Vijayawada.
