= List of Odia films of 1962 =

This is a list of films produced by the Ollywood film industry based in Cuttack in 1962:

== A-Z ==
Title	Director	Cast	Genre	Notes
1962
ଦସ୍ୟୁ ରତ୍ନାକର; Dasyu Ratnakara	Prabhat Mukherjee	Sharat Pujari, Shanti, Prashanta Nanda	Mythological	
ଜୟଦେବ; Jayadeba	Byomakesh Tripathy	Byomakesh Tripathy, Shefali	Historical	
ଲକ୍ଷ୍ମୀ Lakhmi	Sharada Nayak	Gaur Ghosh, Manimala, Babi, Dayanidhi Das	Mythological	
Nua Bou	Prabhat Mukherjee	Sharat Pujari, Leela	Social	Winner of National Award in Regional category
