= Pempudu Koduku =

1953 film by L. V. Prasad

- Theatrical release poster
- Directed by: L. V. Prasad
- Story by: Vempati Sadasiva Brahmam
- Produced by: A. V. Subbarao
- Starring: Sivaji Ganesan; Savitri; Pushpavalli; Kanda Mohanbabu
- Music by: S. Rajeswara Rao
- Production company: Prasad Art Pictures
- Release date: 12 November 1953
- Country: India
- Language: Telugu

Pempudu Koduku (transl. Foster Child) is a 1953 Indian Telugu-language drama film directed by L. V. Prasad and produced by A. V. Subbarao. The film stars Sivaji Ganesan, Savitri, Pushpavalli and Kanda Mohanbabu.

== Cast ==
- Sivaji Ganesan
- Savitri
- Pushpavalli
- Kanda Mohanbabu
- Kumari
- S. V. Ranga Rao
- L. V. Prasad

== Soundtrack ==
The music was composed by S. Rajeswara Rao. Lyrics by Vempati Sadasivabrahmam and Sri Sri.

No.	Song	Singers	Lyrics	Length (m:ss)
1	Mabbulu Mabbulu Mabbulocchinay	Ghantasala & Jikki	Vempati Sadasivabrahmam	04.15
2	Virodhamelane	A. M. Rajah	Sri Sri	02.27
3	Unnavarike	Jikki		03:09
3	Sannajaji Thotalo	Jikki		02:50
