= Vindhyarani =

- Directed by: C. Pullayya
- Written by: Pingali Nagendra Rao
- Starring: Akkineni Nageswara Rao; G. Varalakshmi; Relangi; Pushpavalli; D. V. Subba Rao; A. V. Subba Rao; B. Padmanabham
- Cinematography: C. V. Ramakrishnan
- Edited by: K. R. Krishna Swamy
- Music by: Emani Sankara Sastry; S. Rajeswara Rao
- Release date: 14 January 1948
- Country: India
- Language: Telugu

Vindhyarani advertisement in 1948 issue of Chandamama magazine.

Vindhyarani (transl. Queen of the Vindhyas) is a 1948 Indian Telugu-language film directed by C. Pullayya. It is a film based on a drama written by Pingali Nagendra Rao. Pushpavalli played the title role of Vindhyarani.

== Plot ==
Durjaya kills his elder brother Maharaja Jayaveera of the Vindhya Kingdom and occupies the throne. Satamitra secretly takes care of the Prince Sivasri and is waiting for an opportunity to take revenge. Avanti is the daughter of a subordinate king. She hates men. Durjaya connivingly brings her to the Kingdom and announces her as the Queen. Sivasri and Avanti start loving each other. Satamitra sends message to Sivasri to kill Durjaya. Thinking that his love is a hindrance to his revenge, he told Avanti to forget him and his love. Avanti plans to kill Durjaya and plans to marry Sivasri. Sivasri attacks Durjaya, but pardons him. Avanti kills him and escapes. The drama continues. At the end, Sivasri and Avanti get married and rule the Vindya Kingdom.

== Credits ==
=== Cast ===
- Ramana Rao
- G. Varalakshmi
- Relangi
- Pushpavalli as Vindhyarani
- D. V. Subba Rao
- Sreevatsava
- A. V. Subba Rao
- B. Padmanabham
- Kumari Sakkubai

=== Crew ===
- Director: Chittajallu Pullayya
- Story and Dialogues: Pingali Nagendra Rao
- Production Company: Vyjayanthi Pictures
- Original Music: Eemani Sankara Sastri and Saluri Rajeswara Rao
- Cinematography: C. V. Ramakrishnan
- Film Editing: K. R. Krishnaswamy
- Art Direction: K. R. Sarma
- Sound Engineer: S. C. Gandhi
- Playback singer: Ghantasala
