= List of Meitei-language films of 2024 =

This is a list of Meitei-language (Manipuri) feature films that were certified by Central Board of Film Certification (CBFC) in 2024. It provides details such as the certification number, certification date, film title, run time, rating, director, producer/s, and production house.

The year 2024 marked a significant period for Meitei-language cinema, with several films receiving notable recognition while reflecting the industry's growing thematic diversity. Among the year's most notable releases were Sunita, a biographical drama depicting the life and resilience of Moirangthem Sunita, a visually impaired woman, which won the National Film Award for Best Feature Film in Manipuri at the 72nd National Film Awards; Oneness, a drama based on a true story about a young queer man whose life is cut short because of his sexual identity, becoming the first Manipuri feature film centred on a same-sex relationship and premiering at KASHISH Pride Film Festival 2024, South Asia's largest queer film festival, before becoming the first Meitei-language film officially selected for the Bangalore Queer Film Festival;and Oitharei, a social drama following a traumatised survivor of community violence whose chance encounter with a taxi driver leads to her identity and story coming to light, which was selected for the Indian Panorama section of the 56th International Film Festival of India (IFFI). Collectively, these films reflected the expanding thematic range and increasing visibility of Manipuri cinema.

The Meitei-language (Manipuri) feature films certified by CBFC in 2024
Film Title	Certificate Number	Certification Date	Run Time	Director	Rating	Producer/s	Production House/s (Studio)	Ref
KHOMLANG LAMAN	DIL/1/6/2024-GUW	03 May 2024	79.03	OC Meira	U	Khaidem Nungthilchaibi Devi	World Expression	
NUNGSHIBEINE NUNGSHIMANBEI	DIL/1/8/2024-GUW	22 May 2024	79.29	Thoiba Soibam	U	Leishangthem Naranmani Meitei	—	
LAANGOI	DIL/1/18/2024-GUW	29 August 2024	120	Manoranjan Longjam	U	Asem Nawang Singh	—	
ONENESS (Amata Oina)	DIL/2/13/2024-GUW	26 September 2024	114.17	Priyakanta Laishram	UA	Roushil Singla Priyakanta Laishram	Priyakanta Productions	
PAMJABANA NGAOJARE	DIL/1/26/2024-GUW	03 October 2024	90	Dalom Gurumayum	U	Gurumayum Krishnakumar Sharma	Malang Keithel Pvt. Ltd.	
MITYENGDUGI LAMAN	DIL/2/14/2024-GUW	03 October 2024	100	Hei Sanjit	UA	Khundrakpam Shanjit Singh	—	
UNA UNA	DIL/1/25/2024-GUW	03 October 2024	128.37	Irel Luwang	U	Moirangthem Romesh Singh	—	
THAMBAL LEIKHOK	DIL/1/24/2024-GUW	03 October 2024	120	Khoibam Homeshwori	U	Naorem Jamuna Devi	Home Films Manipur	
LANGDAI AMA	DIL/1/27/2024-GUW	17 October 2024	85	Binoranjan Oinam	U	Thokchom Reshi Singh	—	
MAMIGI LAIREMBI	DIL/1/28/2024-GUW	24 October 2024	80	Thoiba Soibam	U	Oinam Thangal Singh	—	
MANGALSANA	DIL/6/1/2024-GUW	04 November 2024	117.54	Kshetrimayum Priyobrata	UA 13+	Bigyamani Hidangmayum	—	
EIGEE SHAKTHIBI	DIL/1/30/2024-GUW	22 November 2024	147.52	Sudhir Kangjam	U	Thangjam Sunil Singh	Thangjam Film Production	
NAITOM SHATPI	DIL/1/31/2024-GUW	26 November 2024	90.58	Thoiba Ningthou	U	Ningthoujam Leaderson Singh	Ningthou Film Production	
NUNGSHIBEINE NUNGSHIMANBEI - II	DIL/1/32/2024-GUW	05 December 2024	80	Thoiba Soibam	U	Leishangthem Naranmani Meitei	—	
SUNITA	DIL/1/34/2024-GUW	16 December 2024	107.38	Ajit Yumnam	U	Yumnam Brojen Singh	Skyline Pictures	
TARU TARUBI	DIL/1/35/2024-GUW	18 December 2024	107	Hemanta Khuman	U	Yengkhom Romabati Devi	Roma Productions	
MADAM SHIJA	DIL/1/36/2024-GUW	20 December 2024	96	Aditya Kh	U	Langoljam Samson Singh	—	
NUNG ONKHRABA THAMOI	DIL/1/38/2024-GUW	23 December 2024	129..26	Surjit Khuman	U	Moirangthem Sanjit Meitei	—	
OITHAREI	DIL/1/41/2024-GUW	24 December 2024	102	Dinesh Naorem	U	Gibanlata Thokchom	—	
YAHOU THENGBA KHOIMU	DIL/1/40/2024-GUW	24 December 2024	135	Rakesh Naorem	U	Rajkumari Nayansana Devi	—	
LONTHOKTABI	DIL/1/43/2024-GUW	27 December 2024	80	Geet Yumnam	U	Thingbaijam Rajesh Singh	—	
NGAMNABA LANFAMSE	DIL/7/2/2024-GUW	28 December 2024	106.15	OC Meira	UA 16+	Leishangthem Sanjit Singh	—	
