= List of Meitei-language films of 2023 =

It is a list of Manipuri films released in 2023, certified by India's Central Board of Film Certification (CBFC). Though Bamon Ebemma was certified in 2023, the film is slated to be released in 2025.

List of Manipuri films of 2023
Certification date	Title	Director	Cast	Studio (Production house)	Ref
20 March 2023	2020 Gee Thoibi	Chou-En-Lai	Silheiba Ningthoujam; Biju Ningombam; Reshmi Sorokhaibam; Ratan Lai	KDS Films	
25 April 2023	Tamphamani	Urmika Maibam	Araba Laitonjam; Biju Ningombam; Maxina Paonam	AUN Production	
25 April 2023	Ashaobagee Nungshiba	Ningthou Ranjan	Dayananda Leishangthem; Nicky Sorokhaibam; Hemanta; Ratan Lai	Lang-Ngon Ningthou Films	
3 July 2023	Mareibak Ningba Herachandra	Maipaksana Haorongbam	Naorem Pilot; Pinky Saikhom; Jasmin Elangbam; Suraj Ngashepam; Naorem Mahesh; Angom Phiroj	Ibudhou Khamlangba Films, Manipur	
19 July 2023	Joseph's Son	Haobam Paban Kumar	Rewben Mashangva	NFDC; Oli Pictures	
27 December 2023	Thambal: The Legacy of Celestial Flower	Da Tamo Sharma	Avi Khundrakpam; Pinky Saikhom; Lamnganbi Laishram; Suraj Ngashepam	Kangleiwood Cinema	
28 December 2023	Thasida Thabal	Kanta Yengkhomcha	Khaba; Biju Ningombam	Chingu Pangalba Film	
28 December 2023	Bamon Ebemma	Bijgupta Laishram	Silheiba Ningthoujam; Reshmi Sorokhaibam; Kaiku Rajkumar; Soma Laishram; Devita Urikhinbam	Mapari Art	
