= Sri Satyanarayana Mahathyam =

- Theatrical release poster
- Directed by: S. Rajinikanth
- Written by: Samudrala Jr (dialogues)
- Screenplay by: K. Gopal Rao
- Based on: Satyanarayan Puja
- Produced by: P. Satyanarayana
- Starring: N. T. Rama Rao; Krishna Kumari
- Cinematography: C. Nageswara Rao
- Edited by: N. S. Prakash; B. Gopal Rao
- Music by: Ghantasala
- Production company: Aswaraja Pictures
- Release date: 27 June 1964
- Running time: 152 mins
- Country: India
- Language: Telugu

Sri Satyanarayana Mahathyam (transl. Glory of Sri Satyanarayana) is a 1964 Indian Telugu-language Hindu mythological film directed by S. Rajinikanth. It stars N. T. Rama Rao and Krishna Kumari, with music composed by Ghantasala.

== Cast ==
- N. T. Rama Rao as Lord Vishnu & Satyadas (dual role)
- Krishna Kumari as Ratnavalli
- Kanta Rao as Narada Maharshi
- Relangi as Sivakesava Maharaju
- Ramana Reddy as Sadhu Shetty
- Chalam
- Mukkamala as Nandi
- Allu Ramalingaiah as Pakshi
- Prabhakar Reddy as Chandrasena Maharaju
- Dr. Sivaramakrishnaiah
- Geetanjali as Goddess Lakshmi
- Girija as Kalavathi
- Chayadevi as Leelavati
- Suryakala as Goddess Bhudevi

== Soundtrack ==
Sri Satyanarayana Mahathyam

Film score by Ghantasala
- Released: 1964
- Genre: Soundtrack
- Length: 49:00
- Label: His Master's Voice
- Producer: Ghantasala

Music composed by Ghantasala. Lyrics were written by Samudrala Jr. Music released by His Master's Voice.

S. No.	Song title	Singers	length
1	"Jaya Jaya Sreemannarayana"	Ghantasala, P. Leela	3:17
2	"Jaya Radhika Madhava"	Ghantasala	6:34
3	"Nadha Jagannadha"	Ghantasala, A. P. Komala, Vasantha	4:47
4	"Manchi Tarunamuraa"	Ghantasala	1:26
5	"Siva Siva Siva Paramesha"	P. Leela, A. P. Komala	4:33
6	"Om Namo Narayana"	A. P. Komala	3:06
7	"Satyadevuni Sundara Roopam"	Ghantasala, A. P. Komala	4:57
8	"Dhintanana Dhintanana"	P. Susheela	3:37
9	"Oho Oho Chandamama"	Raghavulu, Swarnalatha	3:11
10	"Hey Madhava"	Ghantasala	3:09
11	"Navvala Edvaala"	Madhavapeddi Satyam	3:05
12	"Uppu Pappu"	Madhavapeddi Satyam	3:18
13	"Jaabilli Sobha Neeve"	Ghantasala, P. Susheela	3:26
14	"Maadhava Mounama"	Ghantasala	2:27
15	"Sree Ksheeravaasi"	Ghantasala	2:07
