= List of Malayalam films of 1960 =

This is a chronological list of Malayalam films released in 1960.

== Released films ==
The following is a list of Malayalam films released in 1960

Opening		Sl. no.	Title	Director	Story	Cast(s)	Music director
M A R	29	1	Umma	Kunchacko	Moidu Padiyath (Umma)	Thikkurissy Sukumaran Nair, B. S. Saroja, K. P. Ummer	M. S. Baburaj
S E P	3	2	Poothali	P. Subramaniam	Muttathu Varkey	Thikkurissy Sukumaran Nair, Miss Kumari, Kottarakkara Sridharan Nair	Br Lakshmanan
S E P	3	3	Seeta	Kunchacko	based on the 1943 Hindi movie Ram Rajya	Prem Nazir, T. D. Kusalakumari	V. Dakshinamoorthy
D E C	3	4	Sthreehridayam	JD Thottan	JD Thottan	Pappukutty Bhagavathar, T. S. Muthaiah, Ambika Sukumaran	L. P. R. Varma
D E C	23	5	Neeli Saali	Kunchacko		Boban Kunchacko, Bahadoor, Kanchana	K. Raghavan
