= Chalam (actor) =

Indian actor

- Born: 18 May 1929; Palakollu, Madras Presidency, British India (now Andhra Pradesh, India)
- Died: 4 May 1989 (aged 59)
- Occupations: Actor, Producer
- Years active: 1953-1986
- Spouse(s): Ramana Kumari (Died in 1964); Sarada (m.1972; div.1984)
- Children: 3

Chalam (born Simhachalam Korada) (18 May 1929 – 4 May 1989) was an Indian film actor, and producer known for his works primarily in Telugu cinema, and Telugu theatre. In 1971 he produced and acted in Mattilo Manikyam which won the Best Feature Film in Telugu at the 19th National Film Awards. In a film career spanning 30 years, Chalam starred in about 150 films in a variety of roles.

== Personal life ==
Chalam married Ramana Kumari, and changed her name to Ramana Chalam. They have 3 children. Ramana Kumari died in 1964 in a fire accident. Chalam later married Urvasi Sarada, his co-star in her debut film, Tandrulu Kodukulu in 1972. They later divorced in 1984.

== Death ==
Chalam died on 4 May 1989, due to alcohol addiction. In his final days, he also suffered from depression.

== Selected filmography ==
=== Actor ===
- Kodarikam (1953)
- Naa Chellelu (1953)
- Thodu Dongalu (1954)
- Jataka Phalam (1954)
- Vadinagaari Gajulu (1955)
- Donga Ramudu (1955)
- Santanam (1955)
- Bhale Ramudu (1956)
- Sarangadhara (1957)
- Vaddante Pelli (1957) as Pasupati
- Bhooloka Rambha (1958) as Sumanthudu
- Pelli Sandadi (1959)
- Nithya Kalyanam Paccha Thoranam (1960)
- Kuladaivam (1960)
- Abhimanam (1960)
- Vagdanam (1961)
- Tandrulu Kodukulu (1961)
- Pellikaani Pillalu (1961)
- Siri Sampadalu (1962)
- Paruvu Prathishta (1963)
- Thobuttuvulu (1963)
- Dr. Chakravarthy (1964)
- Babruvahana (1964) as Babruvahana
- Kalavari Kodalu (1964)
- Peetala Meedha Pelli (1964)
- Sri Satyanarayana Mahathyam (1964)
- Sri Simhachala Kshetra Mahima (1965)
- Preminchi Choodu (1965)
- Aatma Gowravam (1965)
- Visala Hrudayalu (1965)
- Navarathri (1966)
- Srimathi (1966) as Venkat
- Adugu Jaadalu (1966)
- Pattukunte Padivelu (1967) as Daivadheenam
- Private Master (1967)
- Devuni Gelichina Manavudu (1967) as Gurudattudu
- Poola Rangadu (1967)
- Brahmachari (1968)
- Manchi Kutumbam (1968)
- Evaru Monagadu (1968) as Das
- Bhale Monagadu (1968)
- Govula Gopanna (1968)
- Manushulu Marali (1969)
- Sattekalapu Satteyya (1969)
- Chiranjeevi (1969)
- Nindu Hrudayalu (1969)
- Sambarala Rambabu (1970)
- Mattilo Manikyam (1971)
- Pattindalla Bangaram (1971)
- Bomma Borusa (1971)
- Bullemma Bullodu (1972) - Remake of Bhale Jodi (1970)
- Ooriki Upakaari (1973)
- Ramude Devudu (1973)
- Devudamma (1973) as Devudu
- Amma Manasu (1974)
- Bantrotu Bharya (1974)
- Bhoomi Kosam (1974) as Suryam
- Tulabharam (1974)
- Chairman Chalamaiah (1974) - Remake of Mayor Muthanna
- Thota Ramudu (1975) - Remake of Sampathige Savaal
- Sitamma Santanam (1977)
- Lambadolla Ramdasu (1978)
- Chilipi Krishnudu (1978)
- Pranam Khareedu (1978)
- Annadammula Savaal (1978)
- Dudu Basavanna (1978) as Basavanna - Remake of Bangaarada Panjara
- Chillra Kottu Chittemma (1978)
- Mallepoovu (1978)
- Kaliyuga Mahabharatam (1978)
- Gorintaku (1979)
- Konte Mogudu Penki Pellam (1980) as Venkatachalam
- Pelli Chesi Choopistaam" (1983)
- Allullostunnaru (1984)
- Visha Kanya (1985)
- Sri Shirdi Saibaba Mahathyam (1986)

=== Producer ===
- Sambarala Rambabu (1970)
- Mattilo Manikyam (1971)
- Pelli Chesi Choopistaam (1983)

== Awards ==
National Film Awards

Best Feature Film in Telugu (Producer) Mattilo Manikyam
