= Tapi Chanakya =

Indian film director and writer

Tapi Chanakya (1925–1973) was an Indian film director and writer. He was the son of the famous writer Tapi Dharma Rao Naidu. He worked as a radio telegraphist for the Indian Army.

== Filmography ==
1. Palletoori Pilla (Telugu) (1950) – Assistant Director
2. Anta Manavalle (1954)
3. Rojulu Marayi (Telugu) (1955) – Director and Screen Adaptation
4. Peddarikalu (1957)
5. Ettuku Pai Ettu (1958)
6. Bhagya Devatha (1959)
7. Jalsarayudu (1960)
8. Kumkumarekha (1960)
9. Pudhiya Pathai (1960)
10. Kalasivunte Kaladu Sukham (1961)
11. Constable Koothuru (1963)
12. Ramudu Bheemudu (Telugu) (1964)
13. Varasatwam (1964)
14. C.I.D. (1965)
15. Enga Veetu Penn (1965)
16. Enga Veettu Pillai (1965)
17. Adugu Jaadalu (1966)
18. Naan Aanaiyittal (1966)
19. Ram Aur Shyam (Hindi) (1967)
20. Oli Vilakku (1968)
21. Pudhiya Boomi (1968)
22. Madhavi (1969)
23. Vidhi Vilasam (1970)
24. Bangaru Talli (1971)
25. Bikhre Moti (Hindi) (1971)
26. Man Mandir (Hindi) (1971)
27. Bandhipotu Bhayankara (1972)
28. Jaanwar Aur Insaan (Hindi) (1972)
29. Manavata (Hindi) (1972)
30. Subha-O-Sham (Hindi & Persian) (1972)
31. Ganga Manga (Telugu) (1973)
