= Pushpavalli =

Indian actress (1926–1991)

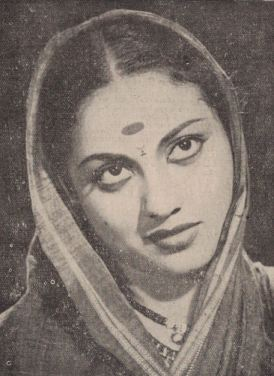
- Pushpavalli in 1948
- Born: Kandala Venkata Pushpavalli Tayaramma; 3 January 1926; Pentapadu, Madras Presidency, British India (present-day Andhra Pradesh, India)
- Died: 28 April 1991 (aged 65); Madras, Tamil Nadu, India
- Occupation: Actress
- Years active: 1936–1969
- Spouses: I. V. Rangachari; K. Prakash
- Partner: Gemini Ganeshan
- Children: 6; including Rekha
- Relatives: Shubha (niece); Vedantam Raghavayya (brother-in-law)

Kandala Venkata Pushpavalli Tayaramma (3 January 1926 – 28 April 1991), known mononymously as Pushpavalli, was an Indian actress who predominantly worked in Telugu and Tamil films. She started working in the film industry as a child actress with a small role as young Sita in the film Sampoorna Ramayanam (1936). This was followed by a few more roles as child star. Pushpavalli later graduated to doing roles as an adult. Her biggest hit was the Telugu film Bala Nagamma (1942), where she played an important supporting role. Her 1947 film Miss Malini, where she played the lead role, received great critical acclaim from the intelligentsia, but flopped at the box office. She continued playing supporting roles well into the late 1960s.

She married I. V. Rangachari in 1940 but they began living apart from 1946. Later, Pushpavalli was in a relationship with actor Gemini Ganesan with whom she had two daughters, Rekha, a noted actress in Hindi film industry, and Radha.

== Biography ==
Pushpavalli was born as Kandala Venkata Pushpavalli Tayaramma to Kandala Ramakotamma and Kandala Thathachary in Pentapadu village of West Godavari district, Andhra Pradesh (at that time in Madras Presidency). She entered the film industry as a child actress, credited as Pushpavalli Tayaramma, with a small role as young Sita in the film Sampoorna Ramayanam (8 August 1936), shot in Rajamundry in the first Studio in Andhra Region, Durga Cinitone, which was released when she was only nine years old. She was paid Rs 300/- for a three-day shoot, which was a princely sum in those days. This was followed by a few more roles as child star, and Pushpavalli's income became important to her family. Due to these preoccupations, she spent significant time on film sets, missed out on schooling and had only a rudimentary education. She married a lawyer named I. V. Rangachari around 1940. However, the marriage did not last long and they began living apart from 1946. Pushpavalli had two children (son Babji, daughter Rama) from her marriage to Rangachari.

Pushpavalli graduated to doing adult roles with hardly any break from playing a child star. This was a necessity, because acting was the source of income for the family, and she could not afford to take a break. However, this continuity may have affected her acting career, and she was never actually accepted as a leading lady. She did only a few roles as female lead, and in between did many films where she played the second lead. In all, she acted in around 20-25 Telugu and Tamil films (including child roles) and met with only moderate success. She was never a top-level star, nor received critical acclaim for her acting talent. Perhaps her biggest hit was the Telugu film Bala Nagamma (1942), where she played an important supporting role. Her 1947 film Miss Malini, where she played the lead role, received great critical acclaim from the intelligentsia, but flopped at the box office.

Miss Malini (1947) also marked the acting debut of Gemini Ganesan, her future consort. Pushpavalli next worked with Ganesan in the Tamil film Chakradhari (1948), where she was the heroine, and he played a small role. After this point, the situation reversed; Ganesan became a huge star and Pushpavalli started getting only supporting roles, her films as heroine having mostly flopped. She did a few more films with Ganesan, the two got along very well, and entered into a relationship, despite the fact that both of them were married to other people (Ganesan had married his first wife Alamelu, known informally as Bobji, at a very young age and would remain married to Bobji until his death).

Pushpavalli and Ganesan had two daughters together in quick succession. The elder of them is the Bollywood actress Rekha (born in 1954) and the younger is Radha, who briefly worked in Tamil movies before marrying and moving to the United States. Ganesan did not acknowledge paternity of the girls for several years, and was only an occasional visitor to Pushpavalli's house. The relationship deteriorated quickly and the couple was soon estranged. As early as 1955, before the birth of Radha, Ganesan had secretly married the famous actress Savitri, and that relationship was publicly acknowledged as a valid marriage. This was possible because until 1956, it was legally permissible for a Hindu man to have more than one wife. Since Savitri was unmarried, it was possible for her to become Ganesan's legal second wife. Since Pushpavalli was still legally married to Rangachari (divorce was not available to Hindus at all until 1956); that option was not available to her, and it was impossible for her to marry anyone else. Some sources say Pushpavalli and Ganesan were married in Tirupathi.

After being estranged from Ganesan, Pushpavalli did a few more films, mostly minor roles, including a couple of Hindi films made by her old associates in the South Indian film industry. She did these roles in order to support her daughters, whom she brought up single-handedly in a very frugal way. Gemini Ganesan did not want to recognize Rekha as his daughter and give her a living. He rarely met both of his children with Pushpavalli. Pushpavalli subsequently married K. Prakash, a cinematographer from Madras, and she legally changed her name to K. Pushpavalli. She gave birth to two more children, Dhanalakshmi (who later married the actor Tej Sapru) and the dancer Seshu (died 21 May 1991). Due to her mother's hectic acting schedule at the time, Rekha would often stay with her grandmother. Asked in an interview by Simi Garewal about her father, Rekha believed he was never even aware of her existence. She recalled that her mother often spoke about him and added that despite never having lived with him, she felt his presence all through.

The fact that Rekha became so successful in films was a source of great satisfaction to Pushpavalli, as was the fact that her third daughter, Radha married Syed Usman, a former Bollywood model in 1976, and the couple now reside in USA.

Pushpavalli died in 1991 of ailments associated with diabetes in Madras.

== Filmography ==
Year	Film	Language	Role	Notes
1936	Sampoorna Ramayanam	Telugu	Child artist/Sita	
1937	Chal Mohana Ranga	Telugu		
1938	Mohini Bhasmasura	Telugu	Mohini/Vishnu	
1938	Satyanarayana Vratham	Telugu		
1939	Vara Vikrayam	Telugu	Kamala	
1940	Malathi Madhavam	Telugu		
1940	Viswa Mohini	Telugu		
1941	Choodamani	Telugu	Choodamani	
1941	Tara sasankam	Telugu	Tara	
1942	Bala Nagamma	Telugu	Sangu	
1942	Satyabhama	Telugu		
1944	Dasi Aparanji	Tamil	Aparanji	
1945	Paduka Pattabhishekam	Telugu	Seeta	
1947	Miss Malini	Tamil	Malini	
1948	Vindhyarani	Telugu	Vindhyarani	
1948	Queen of the Vindhiyas	English	Vindhyarani	
1948	Chakradhari	Tamil	Thulasi Bai	
1951	Samsaram	Tamil	Manjula	
1951	Sansar	Hindi	Laxmi	
1952	Daasi	Telugu		
1953	Velaikari Magal	Tamil		
1953	Pempudu Koduku	Telugu	Mangamma	
1954	Bahut Din Huwe	Hindi	Bhulaxmi	
1956	Sri Gowri Mahatma	Telugu	Guest Appearance	
1957	Bhaktha Markandeya	Tamil	Marudvati	
1957	Bhaktha Markandeya	Telugu	Marudvati	
1958	Chenchu Lakshmi	Telugu	Leelavathi	
1958	Chenchu Lakshmi	Tamil	Leelavathi	
1958	Inti Guttu	Telugu	Mahalakshmamma	
1958	Sampoorna Ramayanam	Tamil	Kausalya	
1960	Petra Manam	Tamil		
1963	Bandipotu	Telugu	Annapoorna	
1963	Grahasti	Hindi	Mohan's Mother	
1964	Amara Shilpi Jakkanna	Telugu	Queen Santhala	
1964	Amarashilpi Jakanachari	Kannada	Queen Santhala	
1964	Sirpiyin Selvan	Tamil	Queen Santhala	
1964	Manchi Chedu	Telugu		
1964	Kai Kodutha Deivam	Tamil		
1965	Aada Brathuku	Telugu		
1965	Vaazhkai Padagu	Tamil		
1965	Sati Sakkubai	Telugu		
1966	Rangula Ratnam	Telugu		
1966	Shakuntala	Telugu	Raja Maata	
1966	Pratigna Palana	Telugu	Maha Rani	
1966	Bhoolokamlo Yamalokham	Telugu		
1967	Sati Sumathi	Telugu		
1967	Bhama Vijayam	Telugu	Maha Rani	
1969	Bangaru Panjaram	Telugu	Gowri	

== Bibliography ==
- Usman, Yasser (24 August 2016). Rekha: The Untold Story. New Delhi, India: Juggernaut Books. ISBN 978-81-93284-18-6.
