= Govindarajula Subba Rao =

Indian actor

- Born: 1895
- Died: 29 October 1959 (aged 63–64); Chennai, India
- Occupation: Actor

Dr. Govindarajula Venkata Subba Rao (1895 – 29 October 1959) was a famous Telugu drama and film actor.

== Life sketch ==
He played in the drama Merchant of Venice during the school days in Tenali. He portrayed Satyaki and Bheema in Gayopakhyanam as his debut performance during the convocation function. Subsequently, he acted many dramas in variety of characters. They include Hyderjung in Bobbili, Lubdhavadhanlu in Kanyasulkam.

He has done L.M.P. in Madras. During this period he has acted in Prataparudreeyam written by Vedam Venkataraya Sastry. During one of their shows he impressed the author. He toured Andhra Pradesh and acted as Yugandhar which brought him laurels. Subsequently, he continues to act in dramas while practising medicine.

He entered Telugu films with Mala Pilla (1938) directed by Gudavalli Ramabrahmam as Sundararama Sastry. He played many Mythological, historical and social roles. He has distinct postures and gestures that are characteristic to him. He portrayed Mayala Marathi in Bala Nagamma (1942), Brahma Naidu in Palnati Yudham, Shvaukaru Changaiah in Shavukaru and Lubdhavadhanulu in Kanyasulkam.

=== Filmography ===
1. Malapilla (1938) as Sundara Rama Sastry (debut)
2. Gruhalakshmi (1938)
3. Bala Nagamma (1942) as Mayala Marathi
4. Mugguru Maratilu (1946) as Marathi ruler Siddhoji
5. Palnati Yudham (1947) as Brahma Naidu
6. Ratnamala (1947)
7. Dharmangada (1949)
8. Gunasundari Katha (1949) as King Ugrasena
9. Shavukaru (1950) as Shavukaru Changaiah
10. Kanyasulkam (1955) as Lubdhavadhanlu
11. Charana Daasi (1956) as Basavaiah
12. Bhagya Rekha (1957) as Musalaiah
13. Panduranga Mahatyam (1957)
