= Rushyendramani =

Indian actress, singer, and dancer

- Born: Rudravathi; 1 January 1917; Vijayawada, Madras Presidency, British India
- Died: 17 August 2002 (aged 85); Chennai, Tamil Nadu, India
- Years active: 1935; 1942-1986
- Spouse: Javvadi RamaKrishna Rao (m.1939-1998)
- Relatives: Bhavani (granddaughter)

Rushyendramani (1 January 1917 – 17 August 2002) was an Indian film actress, playback singer, and dancer from Andhra Pradesh. She had more than 150 films in Telugu, Tamil, Kannada, Malayalam and Hindi films from 1935 to 1986. Her notable films include Sri Seetarama Jananam (1944), Malliswari (1951), Vipra Narayana (1954), Chintamani (1956). Her last film was Sri Shirdi Saibaba Mahathyam (1986).

== Early life ==
She was born in Vijayawada on 1 January 1917. A trained singer in both the Indian classical music traditions and a trained Kuchipudi and Bharatanatyam dancer, she started her career on stage at the age of seven. She donned the mantle of Krishna and Prahalada by the age of 10. Later she joined Lakshmi Vilasa Nataka Sabha of Kommuri Pattabhi Ramayya. She was trained under Kapilavai Ramanatha Sastry, Puvvula Ramatilakam and acted in the dramas Chintamani and Savitri.

== Film career ==
She moved to the silver screen and acted as Satyabhama in Srikrishna Tulabaram, produced by Rajarao Naidu in 1935. It was a commercial failure, but she won acclaim for her singing and acting prowess. She joined the Rajarajeswari Natya Mandali of Kadaru Nagabhushanam and P. Kannamba and extensively toured entire Andhra Pradesh, Karnataka, parts of Maharashtra, Orissa and Tamil Nadu. She earned accolades for her portrayal of Prabhavati in Rangoon Rowdi and Narada in Savitri. Her popularity and acting prowess crowned her as the "Rayalaseema Rani".

Married to Javvadi Ramakrishna Rao Naidu in 1939, an accomplished musician and composer who scored music to many stage plays, she accompanied him to Madras. Ramakrishna Rao worked as music director in the Tamil film Mathru Bhoomi. As with many actresses of that era, she was a great singer too.

Her first film was Sri Krishna Tulabharam (1935), where she played the role of Satyabhama. She acted in Patni (1942) as Kannagi based on the Tamil epic Shilappadikaram. The Kovalan character was played by K. S. Prakash Rao. With the success of this film, she reached the pinnacle in the film world. She acted as Adilaxmi in Chenchu Lakshmi, which was also successful. She was in Seeta Rama Jananam in 1944, followed by Malliswari, Vipra Narayana, Maya Bazar, Jagadeka Veeruni Katha, Aggi Ramudu, Sri Krishna Satya and Panduranga Mahatyam, and portrayed a variety of characters.

She has done heroic roles in several Telugu films. In 1962, she starred in a leading role in the Malayalam swashbuckler film Palattu Koman, directed by Kunchacko. She was credited as Sree Ramani in the film.

With over 150 films in all the major South Indian languages and Hindi, she was awarded the title of "Madhura Gaana Saraswati" by the Raja of Karvetinagaram for her singing skills. She also acted with her granddaughter Bhavani in the 1974 Kannada film Bhootayyana Maga Ayyu, where Bhavani won the best actress award and Rushyendrami won the award for the best supporting actress.

== Personal life ==
She died on 17 August 2002 at Chennai. She was survived by two daughters and one son, grandchildren and great-grandchildren.

== Filmography ==
1. Srikrishna Tulabhaaram (1935)
2. Patni (1942) as Kannagi
3. Seeta Rama Jananam (1942) (actress and playback singer)
4. Chenchu Lakshmi (1943) (actress and playback singer)
5. Dharmangada (1949)
6. Malliswari (1951) as Nagamma
7. Sri Kalahastiswara Mahatyam (1954)
8. Chandraharam (1954) Telugu/Tamil
9. Vipranarayana (1954)
10. Aggi Ramudu (1954)
11. Mangalyam (1954) (Tamil)
12. Guna Sundari (1955)
13. Missamma (1955) as Gopalam's wife
14. Maya Bazaar (1957) as Subhadra (actress and playback singer)
15. Maya Bazaar (1957) as Subhadra (actress and playback singer)
16. Panduranga Mahatyam (1957) as Laxmi
17. Bommala Pelli (1958) Telugu/Tamil
18. Chenchu Lakshmi (1958)
19. Abalai Anjugam (1959)
20. Deepavali (1960) as Devas mother Aditi
21. Sri Venkateswara Mahatyam (1960) as Dhaaranidevi
22. Jagadeka Veeruni Katha (1961) as Maharani
23. Gulebakavali Katha (1962)
24. Gundamma Katha (1962)
25. Vikramaadhithan (1962)
26. Palattu Koman (1962; credited as Sree Ramani)
27. Sri Krishnarjuna Yudham (1963) as Wife of Gaya
28. Chitor Rani Padmini (1963)
29. Ramudu Bheemudu (1964)
30. Enga Veetu Pillai(1965)
31. Navarathri (1966) as Brothel house Head
32. Pidugu Ramudu (1966)
33. Sri Krishnavataram (1967/I)
34. Mattilo Manikyam (1971) as Lalitha's grandmother
35. Bhootayyana Maga Ayyu (1974)
36. Srimadvirat Veerabrahmendra Swami Charitra (1984)
37. Sri Shirdi Saibaba Mahathyam (1986)
