= C. H. Narayana Rao =

Indian actor

- Died: 14 February 1984; Chennai
- Occupation: actor
- Awards: Andhra Kalakshethram Award; Nataka Ratna

C. H. Narayana Rao was an Indian actor and producer known for his works in Telugu cinema and Telugu theatre. He starred in more than fifty films in a variety of roles. His notable works include classics such as Chenchu Lakshmi (1943), Mugguru Maratilu (1946), Mana Desam (1949), Jeevitham (1950), Veelunama (1965) to name a few.

He was one of the most sought after actors in Telugu cinema before the introduction of Akkineni Nageswara Rao and N. T. Rama Rao. He produced Manjari in 1953 directed by Y. V. Rao.

== Early life ==
He has been working in Indian Railways in 1939. He started theatre with Miss Prema B.A. written by Malladi Krishna Sharma directed by Thimmaraju Siva Rao and garnered rave reviews. At this stage, He was found by Dronamraju Kameswara Rao who introduced him to Telugu screen with the 1940 classic Jeevana Jyoti.

== Filmography ==
1. Jeevana Jyothi (1940)
2. Devatha (1941) as Sukumar
3. Bhakta Potana (1942) as Lord Rama
4. Chenchu Lakshmi (1943) as Vishnu
5. Tahsildar (1944) as Narasayya
6. Swargaseema (1945)
7. Mugguru Maratilu (1946)
8. Jeevitham (1949) as Murthi
9. Mana Desam (1949)
10. Tirugubatu (1950)
11. Paramanandayya Sishyulu (1950)
12. Aada Janma (1951)
13. Manavati (1952)
14. Manjari (1953)
15. Menarikam (1954)
16. Rojulu Marayi (1956)
17. Ganga Gauri Samvadam (1958)
18. Pelli Sandadi (1958)
19. Veelunama (1965)
20. Rahasyam (1967) as Nagayya
21. Oke Kutumbam (1970)
22. Vintha Samsaram (1971) as Justice Dharma Rao
23. Bhale Mosagadu (1972) as Mr. Baba, the scientist
24. Desoddharakulu (1973)
25. Manchi Vallaki Manchivadu (1973)
26. Bhagasthulu (1975) as Venkat Rao
27. Sivamethina Satyam (1980) as Judge
28. Kottapeta Rowdy (1980)
29. Chandipriya (1980)
30. Bandhalu Anubandhalu (1982)
31. Madhura Swapnam (1982)

1971-75 కాలం లో సినిమా ల్లో కలెక్టర్ జానకి మరియు బాల భారతం (ద్రోణుడు పాత్ర)
