= C. S. R. Anjaneyulu =

Indian actor

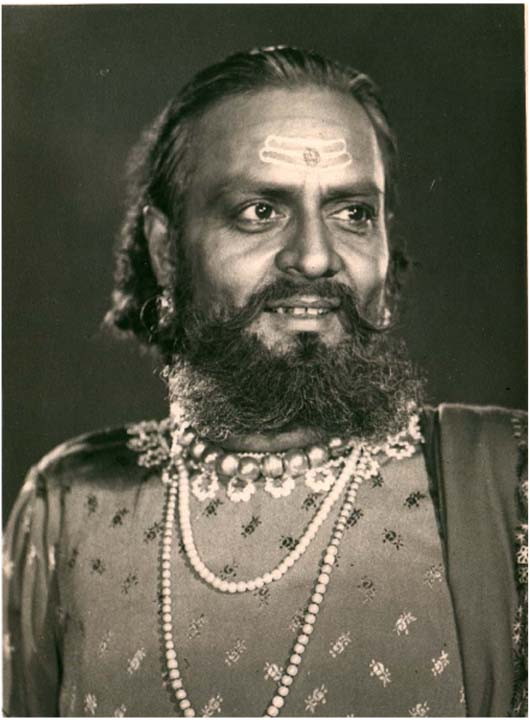
- Born: Chilakalapudi Seeta Rama Anjaneyulu; 11 July 1907; Chilakalapudi, Machilipatnam, Andhra Pradesh
- Died: 8 October 1963 (aged 56)
- Occupations: Actor; thespian
- Years active: 1932–1962

Chilakalapudi Seeta Rama Anjaneyulu (11 July 1907 – 8 October 1963), popularly known as C. S. R., was an Indian method actor, and thespian best known for his work in Telugu cinema and theatre. He acted in many stage dramas and portrayed lead characters and mythological roles in over 175 movies. He was one of the lead actors of his time. Anjaneyulu was an established lead actor by the late 1930s, preceding the entrance of actors such as NTR and ANR. His performance in the super-hit Bhaktha Ramadasu in 1937 won him many accolades. In the 1950s, starting with Pathala Bhairavi screened at the first International Film Festival of India, he began acting in character roles. In Pathala Bhairavi, he plays a king whose daughter is kidnapped by a wicked magician played by Ranga Rao.

He was noted for portraying mythological and historical roles such as Krishna, Ramadasu, Sarangadhara, Bhavani Sankar, Tukaram and Satyavantha. In the 1953 film Devadasu, he portrayed an aged widower zamindar, alongside Savitri, who acts as his wife. His other acclaimed character roles include Sakuni (a character from Mahabharatha) in Mayabazar, as well as roles in Rojulu Marayi, Gruhapravesam, Illarikam, Kanyasulkam and Appu Chesi Pappu Koodu. His directorial credits include the 1939 allegorical melodrama, Jayapradha.

== Early life ==
He was born on 11 July 1907 in a Telugu family at Chilakalapudi near Machilipatnam in Andhra Pradesh. His father, Lakshmi Narasimha Murthy, used to work in Revenue department. He later moved to Ponnur in Guntur district. After school final studies, he worked as a co-operative supervisor for some time. Instead of pursuing further studies, he chose to enter the field of drama. In a short time, he reached a position comparable to Sthanam Narasimha Rao, D. V. Subba Rao, Parupalli, Addanki and others.

He played Sri Krishna in Sri Krishna Tulabaram and Radhakrishna, Ramadas in Bhakta Ramadasu and Tukaram in Bhakta Tukaram, which got him wide recognition. He was also a natural singer, particularly in poems. He was a national activist. He directed and produced Patita Pavana, a drama on Untouchability. He contributed ₹10,000 to the Indian National Army of Subhas Chandra Bose collected through donations by playing his Tukaram drama.

== Personal life ==
He had two younger sisters and two younger brothers. One brother, C. S. Nageswara Rao, was the assistant director for movies including Suvarna Sundari, Gunasundari Katha and Mayabazar. Another brother, C. Venkata Rathnam (better known as C. V. Rathnam), was with Bharani Pictures & Studios and was the production manager for all the films produced by actress Bhanumathi Ramakrishna.

== Filmography ==
List of films and roles
| Year | Title | Role | Notes |
|---|---|---|---|
| 1932 | Rama Paduka Pattabhishekam | | |
| 1936 | Draupadi Vastrapaharanam | Krishna | |
| 1938 | Thukkaram | Tukaram (Thukkaram) | |
| 1939 | Jayaprada | | Also director |
| 1939 | Balaji | Venkateswara | |
| 1941 | Talliprema | Krishna Rao | |
| 1941 | Choodamani | Madhusudhan | |
| 1942 | Sumati | | |
| 1945 | Mayalokam | | |
| 1945 | Paduka Pattabhishekam | Sri Rama | |
| 1947 | Ratnamala | | |
| 1949 | Jeevitham | | |
| 1950 | Paramanandayya Shishyula Katha | Paramanandayya | |
| 1951 | Pathala Bhairavi | Indumati's Father; King of Ujjaini | Simultaneously shot in Tamil |
| 1951 | Soudamini | Vikramasena Maharaj | |
| 1951 | Mantra Dandam | | |
| 1952 | Prema | | Simultaneously shot in Tamil |
| 1953 | Devadasu | zamindar of Durgapuram | Simultaneously shot in Tamil |
| 1953 | Vayyari Bhama | | |
| 1954 | Kanyadanam | | |
| 1954 | Chakrapani | Chakrapani | |
| 1955 | Kanyasulkam | Ramappa Pantulu | |
| 1955 | Rojulu Marayi | Zamindar Sagarayya | |
| 1956 | Bhale Ramudu | Gumasta at the Zamindar | |
| 1956 | Chiranjeevulu | | |
| 1956 | Sonta Ooru | | |
| 1957 | Bhagya Rekha | | |
| 1957 | Mayabazar | Sakuni | |
| 1957 | Suvarna Sundari | | |
| 1957 | Bhale Ammayilu | Subrahmanyam | |
| 1957 | Vaddante Pelli | Purushottam | |
| 1958 | Appu Chesi Pappu Koodu | Rao Bahadur Ramadasu | |
| 1958 | Dongalunnaru Jagratha | | |
| 1959 | Illarikam | Govindayya | |
| 1959 | Vachina Kodalu Nachindi | | |
| 1960 | Annapoorna | | |
| 1960 | Mahakavi Kalidasu | | |
| 1961 | Jagadeka Veeruni Katha | Badarayani Praggada | |
| 1961 | Bhakta Kuchela | Kuchelan | Malayalam film |
| 1961 | Pendli Pilupu | Lawyer Ranganadham | |
| 1962 | Chitti Tammudu | Ansari | |
| 1962 | Tiger Ramudu | Chandraiah | |
| 1962 | Kalimilemulu | Subbaiah | |
| 1962 | Bhishma | Salya | |
| 1963 | Savati Koduku | | |
| 1963 | Irugu Porugu | Parandhamaiah | |
| 1964 | Ramadasu | | |
| 1964 | Bobbili Yudham | Lakshmanna | |
