= List of Telugu films of the 1930s =

This is a list of films produced by the Telugu film industry in the 1930s. In those days most of the actors and actresses were singers, and also stage performers. In. 1930s, there were no regulatory body for films.

| Title | Director | Production | Cast | Release |
|---|---|---|---|---|
1931
| Kalidas | H. M. Reddy | Imperial Movi-Tone | T. P. Rajalakshmi, P. G. Venkatesan, L. V. Prasad | 31 October 1931 |
1932
| Bhakta Prahlada | H. M. Reddy | Sri Krishna Film Company | Venkata Subbaiah Municipalle, Surabhi Kamalabai, 'Master' Krishna, L. V. Prasad | 6 February 1932 |
| Sri Rama Paduka Pattabhishekam | Sarvottam Badami | Sagar Movietone | C. S. R. Anjaneyulu, Surabhi Kamalabai, Yadavalli Suryanarayana | |
| Sakunthala | Sarvottam Badami | Sagar Movietone | Yadavalli Suryanarayana, Surabhi Kamalabai | |
1933
| Chintamani or Bilvamangal | Sadasiva Rao Kallakoori | | Master Baburao, Bhadracharyulu, Pulipati Venkateswarulu, P Ramatilakam, Parvatibai etc. | 29 July 1933 |
| Prudhvi Putra 2 playlets Parijathapa Haranam Narakasura Vadha | Pothina Srinivasa Rao | | Parepalli Satyannarayana, K. Raghuramaiah, Surabhi Kamalabai | 20 December 1933 Kinima Central, Chennai 1933 This is as per Andhra Patrika 1933 December edition |
| Prajvala Alapana | Sadasiva Rao | | | |
| Ramadasu | C. Pullayya, Ghantasala Radhakrishnaiah | | Ghantasala Balaramayya, C. S. R. Anjaneyulu, Satyanarayana Aarani, Rama Thilakam | 2 September 1933 |
| Sati Savitri | C. Pullayya | East India Film Company | Nidumukkala Subba Rao, Rama Thilakam, Vemuri Gaggaiah, Parupalli Satyannarayana | 5 February 1933 |
| Sati Savitri | H. M. Reddy | Bharat MovieTones | Kanthamani, V.V. Subba Rao, K.L. Kantham, Hem Singh | 4 February 1933 |
1934
| Athulya Sahavasam | Pullaya | | | |
| Ahalya | K. Rangarao | | | |
| Lava Kusa | C. Pullaiah | East India Film Company | Parupalli Subba Rao, Sriranjani, 'Master' Bhimarao, 'Master' Malleshwara Rao, Parupalli Satyannarayana | 22 December 1934 |
| Sita Kalyanam | C. Narasimha Rao | Vel Pictures | Madhavapeddi Venkatramaiah, Master Kalyani, Bezawada Rajarathnam, P. Rama Thilakam, Nageswara Rao, Lanka Krishnamurthy | 6 October 1934 |
1935
| Bhakta Kuchela | K. Sadasivarao | Radha Film Company | K. Raghuramaiah, Pulipaka Venkatappaiah, D. S. Prakasarao, Kakinada Rajaratnam, Saraswati, Samrajyam, Sundaram | 20 July 1935 |
| Harishchandra | T. A. Raman | Star Combines | Adhanki Srirama Murthy, P. Kannamba, 'Master' Bhimarao, Pulipati Venkateswarulu, Akulu Narasimha Rao | 9 November 1935 |
| Sati Anasuya | Ahin Chowdhary | | Dasari Kotiratnam, Tungala Chalapati | |
| Sati Sakkubai | Charu Rai | | Tungala Chalapati Rao, Dasari Kotiratnam, Suravarapu Venkateswarulu, Dasari Anjani Bai | 21 May 1935 |
| Sri Krishna Leelalu | C. Narasimha Rao | Vel Pictures | S. Rajeswara Rao, Parepalli Subba Rao, Sriranjani, Vemuri Gaggaiah, P. Rama Thilakam, Parepalli Satyanarayana, C. Lakshmi Rajyam | 30 November 1935 |
| Sri Krishna Tulabharam | C. Pullaiah | East India Film Company | Ramanatha Sastri Kapilavayi, Rushyendramani, Kanchanamala, C. Lakshmi Rajyam, Relangi | 22 April 1935 |
| Rani Premalata | | | | |
1936
| Dhruva (Also Known as Dhruva Vijayamu) | C. Pullaiah | East India Film Company | C. Narayanaswamy, T. Venkateswarulu, M. Hemalata, Sitaram, M. Rangachari, A. Narasimha Rao, Lalitha | |
| Draupadi Maanasamrakshana | N. Jaganatha Swamy | Lakshmi Films | Bellary Raghava, Surabhi Kamalabai, Parepalli Subba Rao, Banda Kanakalingeswararao, V. V. Subba Rao, B. Chalapathi Rao, K. Sivarama Krishnayya | 24 March 1936 |
| Draupadi Vastrapaharanam | H. Vishwanath Babu | Saraswati Talkies | Yadavalli Suryanarayana, P. Kannamba, C. S. R. Anjaneyulu, N. Nagaraja Rao, Lanka Krishna Murthy, Vemuri Gaggaiah, Dommeti Suryanarayana | 29 February 1936 |
| Kabir | S. Rangaswamy | Oriental Classical Films | | 5 February 1936 |
| Lanka Dahanam | K. Sadasivarao | | K. Raghuramaiah | |
| Mayabazar (Also Known as Sasirekha Parinayam) | P. V. Das | Vel Pictures | Yadavalli Nageswara Rao, Santha Kumari, S. P. Lakshmanaswamy, Sriranjani, Turlapati Anjaneyulu, Rami Reddy | |
| Prema Vijayam | Kruthiventi Nageswara Rao | | Ranga Rao, P. S. Sarma, B. Rajalakshma, P. Rama Rao, C. Lakshmi Rajyam, K. Ranga Rao | |
| Premilarjuneyam | | | | |
| Sampoorna Ramayanam | I. Nagabhushana Rao, N. B. Narayana | Durga Cinetone | B. Narayana Murthy, M. Narayana Rao, Pushpavalli, M. Suryanarayana | |
| Sati Tulasi | C. Narasimha Rao | | Ghantasala Balaramayya, Vemuri Gaggaiah, Sriranjani | |
| Sulochana | | | | |
| Veera Abhimanyu | V. D. Ameen | Select Pictures Circuit | Kanchanamala, Pulipati Venkateswarlu, Mantravadi Venkatajogarao | |
1937
| Balayogini | K. Subrahmanyam | Mahalakshmi Studio | Baby Saroja, Aarani Satyanarayana, Vangara, Kamala Kumari, P. Rama Thilakam, Baby S. Varalakshmi | |
| Dasavataramulu | K. V. Bhave | Saraswathi Cinetone | Parepalli Subba Rao, Mandha Subbarao, Dronamraju Narasimharao, Tigela Venkateswarlu, Koderu Rajasodarulu, Dommiti Satyanarayana | 27 September 1937 |
| Kanakatara | H. Vishwanath Babu | Saraswati Talkies | Dommeti Suryanarayana, P. Kannamba, P. Suribabu | |
| Mohini Rukmangada | C. Narasimha Rao | National Movietone | Vemuri Gaggaiah, Yadavalli Suryanarayana, C. Krishnaveni, P. Rama Thilakam, Pulipati Venkateswarlu, T. Ramakrishna Sastry | |
| Nara Narayana | C. Narasimha Rao | | Adhanki Srirama Murthy, P. Rama Thilakam, Pulipati Venkateswarlu | |
| Rukmini Kalyanam | R. Nataraja Mudaliar | Sri Bharatha Lakshmi Pictures | K. Raghuramaiah, Santha Kumari | |
| Sarangadhara | P. Pullaiah | Star Combines | Banda Kanakalingeshwara Rao, Santha Kumari, Adhanki Srirama Murthy, P. Kannamba, Pulipati Venkateswarlu, Sriranjani | |
| Vijayadasami | | | | |
| Vipra Narayana | Ahindra Chaudhari | Arora Pictures | Kasturi Narasimha Rao, Kanchanamala, Suryakumari | |
1938
| Bhakta Jayadeva | Hiren Bose | Andhra Cinetone | Surabhi Kamalabai, Rentachintala Satyanarayana, Santha Kumari, Pulipati Venkateswarlu | |
| Bhakta Markandeya | C. Narayana Murthy | Kubera Films | Vemuri Gaggaiah, Sriranjani, G. S. Swamy | 17 June 1938 |
| Chal Mohana Ranga | C. Pullaiah | Andhra Talkies | Valli Subba Rao, Pushpavalli | 12 January 1938 [Other 2 Documentary Films released] |
| Chitranaleeyam | D. Rami Reddy | Kubera Films | Banda Kanakalingeshwara Rao, Sriranjani, Madhavappedi Venkataramayya | |
| Gruhalakshmi | H. M. Reddy | Rohini Pictures | V. Nagayya, Kanchanamala, P. Kannamba, Ramanujachari, Govindarajula Subba Rao | 12 March 1938 |
| Gulebakavali | Kallakoori Sadasiva Rao | Paramount Film Company | B. Jayamma | |
| Kacha Devayani | C. Dronamraju | Radha Film Company | S. P. Lakshmana Swamy, C. Krishnaveni, C. Suryanarayana Bhagavathar, R. Rami Reddy, K. Raghuramayya | |
| Kasula Peru | C. Pullaiah | Andhra Talkies | K. Hanumantha Rao, Sundaramma, Srihari, Tulasamma | 12 January 1938 [Other 2 Documentary Films released] |
| Krishna Jarasandha | C. Narasimha Rao | Jaya Films | T. Ramakrishna Sastry, M. V. Rajamma, Vemuri Gaggaiah, K. Satyanarayana | |
| Mala Pilla | Gudavalli Ramabrahmam | Jagadeesh Filims | Govindarajula Subba Rao, Kanchanamala, P. Suribabu, Vangara | 25 September 1938 |
| Mohini Bhasmasura | C. Pullaiah | Andhra Talkies | Pushpavalli, A. V. Subba Rao, Dasari Kotiratnam, D. Rama Murthy | |
| Narada Samsaram | | | | |
| Satyanarayana Vratam | C. Pullaiah | Andhra Talkies | Kamaraju, Devarakonda Ramoorthi, Hymavathi, Laxminarasamma | 12 January 1938 [Other 2 Documentary Films released] |
| Thukaram | B. Narayana Rao | Star Combines | C. S. R. Anjaneyulu, Surabhi Kamalabai, Surabhi Balasaraswathi | |
1939
| Amma | Niranjan Pal | | | |
| Jayaprada | Ch. Narasimha Rao | Sharada-Rayalseema Films | C. S. R. Anjaneyulu, K. Pichhaiah, Suryakumari, Lalita | |
| Mahananda | China Kameswara Rao Dronamraju | Jaya Films | Adhanki Srirama Murthy, Parepalli Subba Rao, C. Krishnaveni, P. Kannamba | |
| Malli Pelli | Y. V. Rao | Sri Jagadish Films | Y. V. Rao, K. Sathyanarayana, Kanchanamala, Bezawada Rajarathnam | |
| Panduranga Vittal | B. V. Ramanandam | Radha Film Company | Panchangam Ramanujachary, T. Chalapathi Rao, Dasari Kotiratnam, D. Satyanarayana, Kanthamani | |
| Pasupathastram | K. Ranga Rao | | K. Raghuramaiah | |
| Radha Krishna | | | | |
| Raithu Bidda | Gudavalli Ramabrahmam | Sri Saradhi Films | Bellary Raghava, P. Suri Babu, Suryakumari, G. V. Sitapathy Rao, S. Varalakshmi | 27 August 1939 |
| Sri Venkateswara Mahatyam (Also Known as "Balaji") | P. Pullaiah | Famous Pictures | C. S. R. Anjaneyulu, Santha Kumari, Rajeshwari Devi | |
| Vande Mataram | B. N. Reddy | Vauhini Studios | V. Nagayya, Kanchanamala, Lingamoorthy | |
| Vara Vikrayam | C. Pullaiah | East India Film Company | Pushpavalli, Lakshmikantam Kavi, P. Bhanumathi, Daita Gopalam, Sriranjani | |
1940
| Barrister Parvateesarrn | R. Prakash | Lanka Satyam, G. Varalakshmi, K. Sivarao, L. V. Prasad | Motion Pictures Combines | |
| Bhoja Kalidasu | H. V. Babu | Adhanki Srirama Murthy, Parepalli Subba Rao, P. Kannamba | Jaya Films | |
| Bhookailas | Sundar Rao Nadkarni | M. V. Subbiah Naidu, R. Nagendra Rao, Lakshmi Bai, R. Subramanyam, Hymavathi | Saraswathi Cine Films | |
| Bondam Pelli | H. M. Reddy | L. V. Prasad, G. Varalakshmi | Madras United Artistes Corporation | |
| Chaduvukunna Bharya | H. M. Reddy | Lanka Satyam, G. Varalakshmi | Madras United Artistes Corporation | |
| Chandika | R. S. Prakash | P. Kannamba, Bellary Raghava, Vemuri Gaggaiah, Aarani Satyanarayana | Bhavani Pictures | |
| Illalu | Gudavalli Ramabrahmam | V. Umamaheswara Rao, Kanchanamala, Lakshmi Rajyam | Indira Devi Films | |
| Jeevana Jyothi | China Kameswara Rao Dronamraju | Ch. Narayana Rao, C. Krishnaveni, Kamala Kotnis | M. R. A. Productions | |
| Kalachakram | Amancharla Gopala Rao | Banda Kanakalingeshwara Rao, Lakshmi Rajyam, M. Krishna Rao, N. Nagaraja Rao, Uma Devi | Naveena Bharath | |
| Mahiravana | Ch. Narayana Murthy | Vemuri Gaggaiah, Kanchanamala, R. Subramanyam, Yandamuri Raju, T. Ramakrishna Sastry | Kubera Pictures | |
| Malathi Madhavam | C. Pullaiah | Pushpavalli, C. Srinivasa Rao, P. Bhanumathi, Relangi | Metropolitan Pictures | |
| Meerabai | B. Narasimha Rao | Govindarajula Subba Rao, M. V. Lakshmi, Bogaraju Perraju | Navyakala Films | |
| Sumangali | B. N. Reddy | A. S. Giri, V. Nagayya, Kumari, Malathi | Vauhini Studios | |
| Viswa Mohini | Y. V. Rao | V. Nagayya, Bezawada Rajarathnam, Y. V. Rao, Lalitha Devi | Sri Jagadesh Films | |
