= Chandal =

Chandal may refer to:

- Chandala, a Sanskrit term referring to an outcaste group in Hindu society
- Namasudra, a Hindu community in Bengal formerly known as Chandals
- Chandal, Bangladesh, town in Barisal Division, Bangladesh
- Chandal (tribe), a clan of the Dhund tribe in northern Pakistan
- Chandala Kesavadasu, Indian musician
