= Master Viswam =

Child actor during early era of Telugu Cinema

- Born: Vuppala Viswanadham; January 7, 1932; Jaggayyapeta, Andhra Pradesh
- Died: 8 April 2004 (aged 71–72); Hyderabad, Andhra Pradesh
- Occupations: Child actor Harmonium player Painter; Lecturer; Radio Singer
- Years active: 1940–1942
- Children: 3 daughters and 1 son

'Master Viswam was a child actor during the early era of Telugu Cinema during the British era of India. He shot to fame with the role of Balawardhiraju in 1942 Balanagamma movie produced by Gemini Studios.

== Birth and childhood ==
Master Viswam was born as Vuppala Viswanadham on 7 January 7, 1932, at Jaggayyapeta, Krishna district, Andhra Pradesh to Vuppala Pullayya and Kanakaratnam. His parents shifted later to Nalgonda during his childhood. Telugu actor Kanta Rao used to reside in the opposite house of Viswam and Rao mentioned in his own autobiography Anaganaga Oka Rakumarudu that he was inspired by Viswam towards acting in movies. During his school days in 1949, Mir Osman Ali Khan, the Nizam of Hyderabad was chief guest of Nalgonda Health, Agricultural & Industrial Exhibition. Viswam drew a pencil sketch of Nizam on that stage itself and presented it him. The Nizam was so impressed that he gifted him a gold medal on March 26, 1949.

== Cinema career ==
Since, his father was a music-lover, Viswam was taught Carnatic and Hindustani music from Pandit Mandapati Venkatraju at Nalgonda. In 1940, Bhavani Pictures produced Chandika movie under direction of R. S. Prakash and were looking for child artists. They gave such advertisement in newspaper and Viswam's father applied it casually. In those days more than beauty, the emphasis for selection was more on singing and poetic skills. Viswam was selected and he sang a poem, రాచపుట్టువునకు రణమందు మృతికన్న భాగ్యమేమి? (rAcapuTTuvunaku raNamandu mRtikanna bhAgyamEmi?). He was introduced by Bhavani Pictures group as Master Viswam in that movie. Thus he got introduced to Kannamba, Vemuri Gaggaiah, Bellary Raghava and others. Through them, he got opportunity to act as cowherd boy, Ganesha Bhattu in Bhookailas Telugu movie, produced by A. V. Meiyappan and directed by Sundar Rao Nadkarni. That movie was based on Mahabaleshwara temple legend at Gokarna, Karnataka. Bhookailas was the first blockbuster for AVM Productions. He later acted as Balavardhiraju in Gemini Studios production 1942 blockbuster movie, Bala Nagamma. It is based on famous Telugu Burrakatha folklore story of a queen Balanagamma abducted in the form of a dog by an evil magician, Mayala Marathi and later released by her son Balavardhiraju. That film got much fame and fanfare to Viswam. Kanchanamala acted as Balanagamma and Govindarajula Subbarao took the role of Mayala Marathi.

He later acted in 1942 movie Jeevan Mukthi as Bhavudu. That movie was also produced by S. S. Vasan of Gemini Studios. However, that movie was a miserable flop. In 1944, Pratibha group produced Sitaramajananam movie and were looking for the roles of Rama and Lakshmana. He was called for that and they tested him with makeup. However, may be due to his young age, he was not selected. However, by putting away Viswam in that movie, it paved role for another great actor to have his debut. He was none other than Akkineni Nageswara Rao.

== Later life ==
Due to demise of his father at the age of 14–15, he completely quit movies. He was good painter and used to sell oil paintings. Later, he finished M. A. and worked as English lecturer at Khammam, Nalgonda and Suryapet. Even after many years, those who remembered his role in Balanagamma used to get autograph from him. Viswam continued his music practice music and even composed few songs. Occasionally he was offered to sing by All India Radio At Hyderabad radio, he used to sing songs of C. Narayana Reddy and Dasaradhi. He even performed once before Pandit Jawaharlal Nehru, then Prime minister of India. Thus, he gained good fame as radio singer. Viswam had three daughters and one son, Srinivas Rao who is an employee of BSNL at Kodad.

== Final years ==
After retiring in 1990, he lived with his family. In 1999, a seemingly small injury to a toe became a turning point. Because he was diabetic, the wound failed to heal and was not noticed in time; infection set in and progressed to gangrene. Despite medical attention, doctors were forced to amputate the lower part of his leg. The operation and the loss of mobility altered his life profoundly. Over the next five years he lived largely bedridden, dependent on family members for care and facing the emotional and practical difficulties that accompany long-term illness.

Later he lapsed into a coma, and after a month of declining health he passed away on 8 April 2004.

He appeared in four films as a child actor. At 17, when his father died, he assumed the responsibilities of the eldest son and put family needs ahead of personal ambition. Determined to provide for his household, he secured a stable job and developed practical skills that would support him over the long term. He taught himself photography and painting, both as sources of income and as creative outlets that reflected his artistic temperament.

== Filmography ==
- Chandika, 1940,
- Bhookailas, 1940,
- Bala Nagamma, 1942,
- Jeevan Mukthi, 1942.
