= Kolachalam Srinivasa Rao =

Indian playwright (1854–1919)

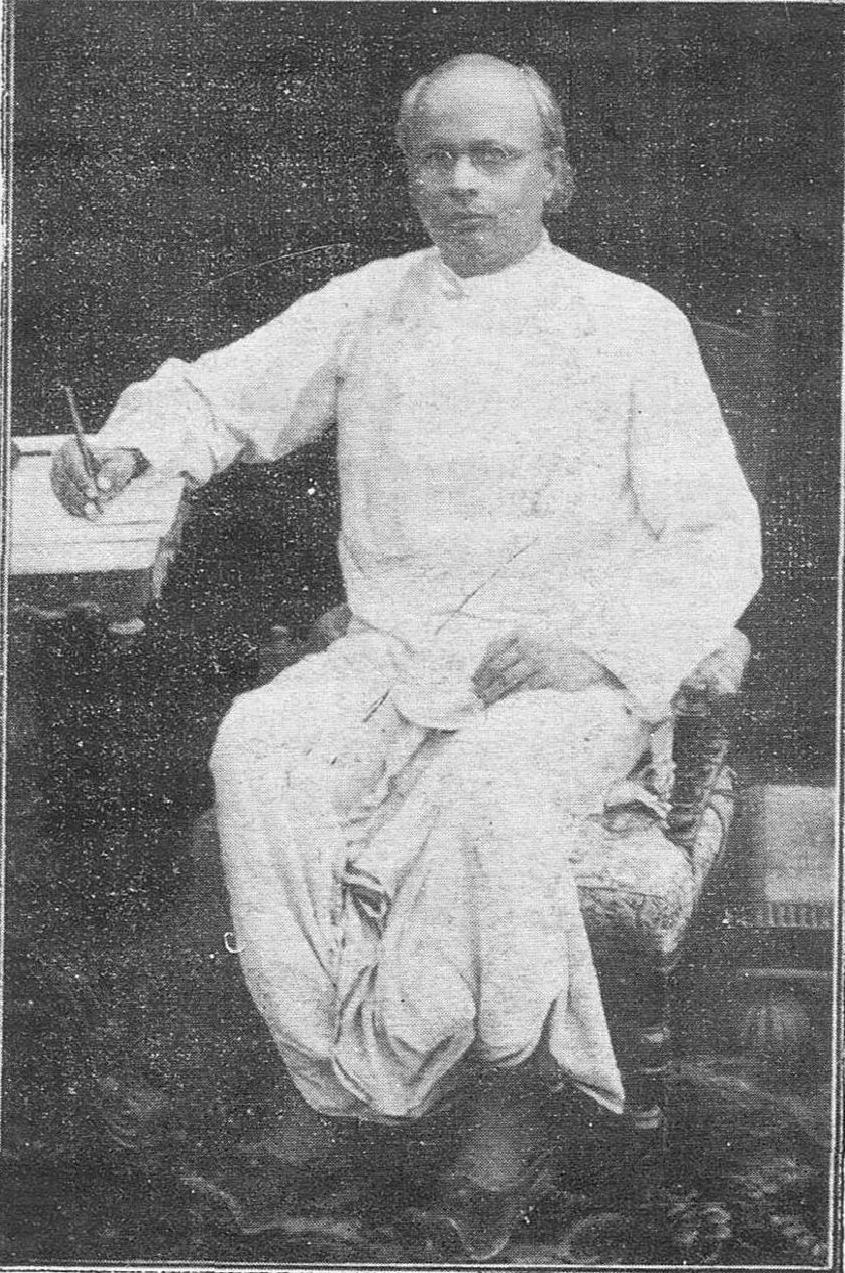
Photograph of Kolachalam Srinivasa Rao in Andhra Patrika.

Kolachalam Srinivasa Rao (Telugu: కోలాచలం శ్రీనివాసరావు) (13 March 1854 – 23 June 1919) was a dramatist from Bellary, India.

== Biography ==
A pleader and a non-professional theatre practitioner from Bellary, Srinivasa Rao belonged to the family of Mallinatha Suri, the world-famous writer acclaimed as Vyakyatha Shiromani. Srinivasa Rao became famous after publishing the English translation of Prapancha Nataka Charitra (The Dramatic History of the World) (Vanivilasa Press, Bellary) in 1908. In childhood, he was accomplished in Sanskrit and Telugu and was familiar with Kannada. His second elder brother Kolachalam Venkata Rao was a lawyer and in a high position, who was later elected as a member of the Madras Assembly. He was further helped by the local environment in Bellary. where the drama movement was flourishing with redoubled vigour. In this conducive atmosphere, he wrote his magnum opus, as well as dramas, and commentaries on the Vedas and other literary works. His first drama was Sunandini Parinayam, published around 1894–95, after which he wrote 30 plays. A large number of these plays were performed by their drama company Sumanorama Sabha. Bellary Raghava and Srinivasa Rao worked closely in running the affairs of the Sabha.

Sumanaroma Sabha staged three plays in the hall of the Sarasa Vinodini Sabha. When Sarasa Vinodini Sabha later refused to lend the hall to them, Srinivasa Rao built a new hall for the Sumanorama Sabha, called Vanivilasa Nataka Shala, which was inaugurated by Balgangadhar Tilak. This was the first theatre building in Bellary, the second one being Ramakrishna Vilas (after Dharmavaraṃ Rāmakr̥ṣṇamācāryulu). Both of these were later converted into cinema theatres - Ramakrishna Vilas renamed Star Cinema and Vanivilas Nataka Shala renamed Prabhat Cinema.

In the preface of his magnum opus, he points to the decadence that had set into Indian language theatres at that point in time, in part because of the decline in morality in the practice of theatre. Finally, after surveying theatre traditions from Japan to the Americas, he provided an exclusive appendix, a list of "rules" like by-laws for contemporary theatre practitioners. Among his recommendations: "Till Hindu society is fully developed physically, greatly reformed morally, and vastly improved intellectually, do not allow a woman to become an actress. Hindu customs and manners do not allow such a course being taken".
