= Tollywood films of the 1930s =

Tollywood films of the 1930s may refer to:

- Indian Bengali films of the 1930s
- Telugu films of the 1930s
