= Sri Krishna Rayabaram =

Play written by Tirupati Kavulu

Sri Krishna Rayabaram; శ్రీ కృష్ణ రాయబారం
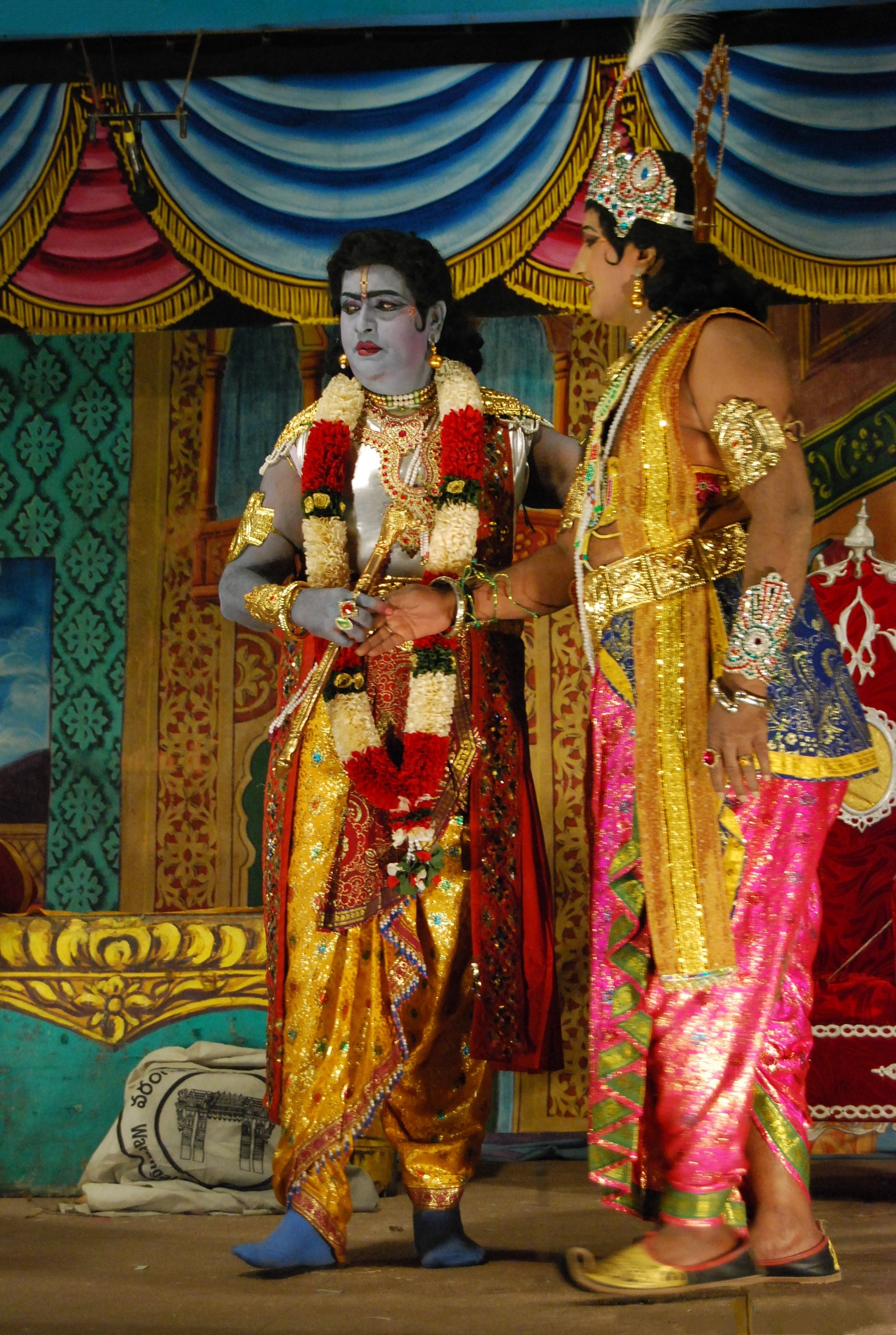
- Sri Krishna Rayabaram Telugu-play on stage.
- Original language: Telugu
- Written by: Tirupati Venkata Kavulu
- Characters: Sri Krishna; Arjuna; Duryodhana
- Genre: Hindu epic

Sri Krishna Rayabaram (Telugu: శ్రీ కృష్ణ రాయబారం) is a popular Telugu drama written by Tirupati Venkata Kavulu in the early 20th century. It was made into a Telugu film in 1960. Many actors and companies have staged this production throughout Andhra Pradesh, India, and abroad.

== Plot ==
The Cal and Lot is based on the story of the Mahabharata, an ancient Sanskrit epic. Krishna acts as an emissary between the Pandavas and the Kauravas to prevent a war. The play opens with the Dvārakā scene, when Krishna is having a nap at his palace. Duryodhana and Arjuna arrive to seek his help in the impending war. Krishna puts himself on one side and his entire army on the other and asks Arjuna to choose first. He promises not to participate in the war himself. Arjuna responds by seeking Krishna's presence in the war as his charioteer. Duryodhana happily gets Krishna's army on his side.

== Depictions in film ==
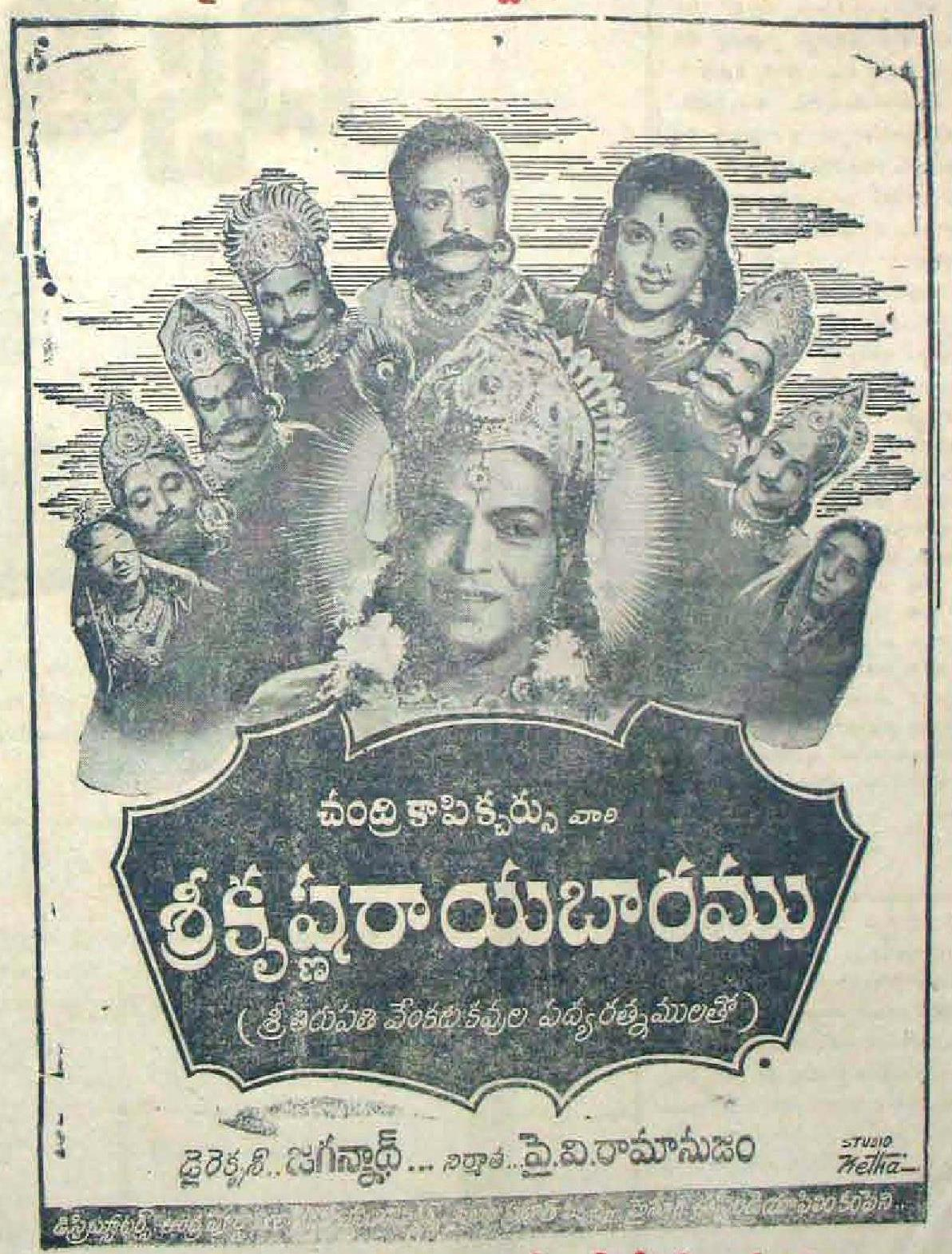
poster of Telugu film Sri Krishna Rayabaramu

Sri Krishna Rayabaram was made as a Telugu film in 1960 by Y. V. Ramanujam under Chandrika Pictures. It starred Kalyanam Raghuramaiah, Puvvula Suri Babu, Gummadi, and Tadepalli Lakshmi Kanta Rao. P. Suri Babu rendered music for the film and rendered some poems.

Films such as Sri Krishna Pandaviyam and Daana Veera Soora Karna dramatised the Rayabaram scene, with the poems rendered by eminent playback singers like V. Ramakrishna. Ghantasala Venkateswara Rao rendered some of the songs for Telugu films.

== Poems from the Rayabaram ==
- Chellio Chellako
- Alugataye Erumgani
- JandaPai KapiRaju
- Santoshambuna SandhiCheyudu
- Tammuni Kodukulu
