= Kalidas (film) =

1931 film by H. M. Reddy

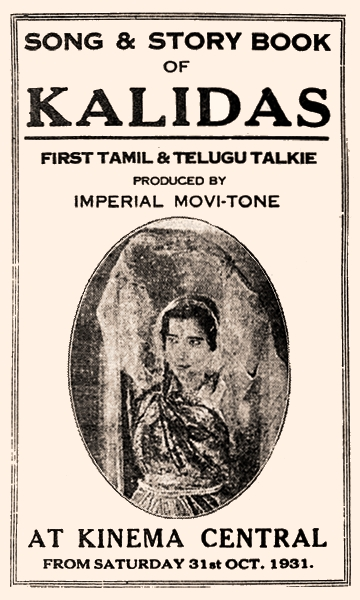
- Directed by: H. M. Reddy
- Produced by: Ardeshir Irani
- Starring: T. P. Rajalakshmi; P. G. Venkatesan
- Production company: Imperial Movi-Tone
- Release date: 31 October 1931
- Country: India
- Languages: Tamil; Telugu

Kalidas (pronounced [kaːɭidaːs] transl. The Servant of Kali) is a 1931 Indian biographical film directed by H. M. Reddy and produced by Ardeshir Irani. It is notable for being the first sound film in the Tamil and Telugu languages, and the first sound film to be made in a Dravidian language. It was based on the life of the Sanskrit poet Kalidasa; it featured P. G. Venkatesan in the title role and T. P. Rajalakshmi as the female lead, with L. V. Prasad, Thevaram Rajambal, T. Susheela Devi, J. Sushila, and M. S. Santhanalakshmi in supporting roles.

Kalidas had dialogues in Telugu, with some Tamil songs featured in the beginning, middle, and end, along with some additional dialogue in Hindi. Despite its mythological theme, the film featured songs from much later time periods, such as the compositions of Carnatic musician Tyagaraja, publicity songs of the Indian National Congress, and songs about Mahatma Gandhi and the Indian independence movement. The sound was recorded using German-made technology. Kalidas was shot in Bombay on the sets of India's first sound film Alam Ara (1931) and was completed in eight days.

Kalidas was released with high expectations on 31 October 1931, coinciding with Diwali day. It was the only South Indian film to be produced and released that year. Despite numerous technical flaws, it received critical acclaim, with praise for Rajalakshmi's singing performance, and became a major commercial success. The success of Kalidas spawned other films based upon Kalidasa, including Mahakavi Kalidasa (1955), Mahakavi Kalidasu (1960), and Mahakavi Kalidas (1966).

In addition to its commercial success, Kalidas was a major breakthrough for Rajalakshmi's career, and made her a bankable singing star. Because no print, gramophone record, or songbook of the film is known to survive, it is a lost film.

== Plot ==
Vidhyadhari is the daughter of Vijayavarman, the king of Thejavathi. His minister wants the princess to marry his son but she refuses. Annoyed, the minister sets out to find another potential husband for Vidhyadhari. In the forest, the minister finds an illiterate cowman sitting on a tree and cutting into the branch on which he is sitting. The minister persuades the cowman to come to the palace and has Vidhyadhari marry him. When Vidhyadhari realises she has been cheated, and is married to a farmhand, she prays to the goddess Kali for a remedy. Kali appears before her, names her husband Kalidas and endows him with phenomenal literary talents.

== Cast ==
- T. P. Rajalakshmi as Vidhyadhari
- P. G. Venkatesan as Kalidas
- L. V. Prasad as the temple priest

Other supporting roles were played by Thevaram Rajambal, T. Susheela Devi, J. Sushila and M. S. Santhanalakshmi.

== Production ==
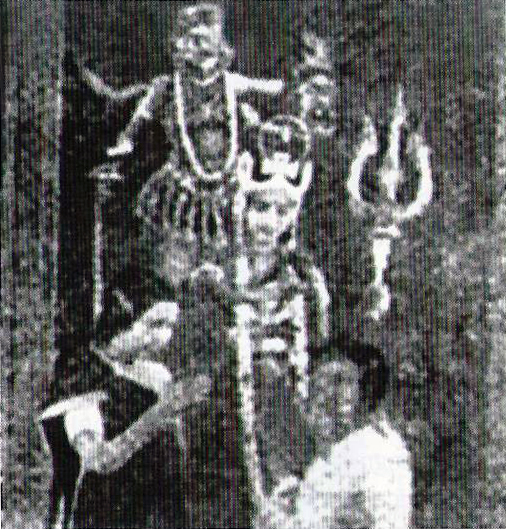
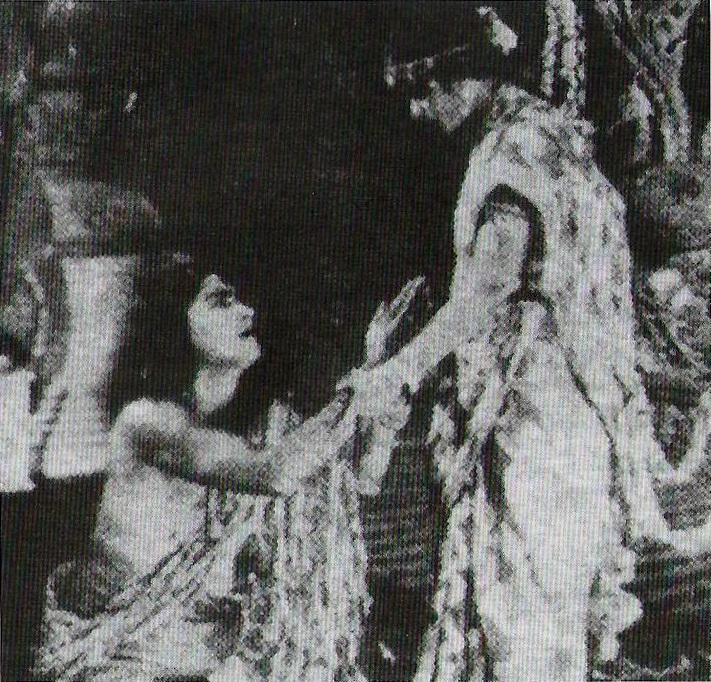
Two surviving stills from Kalidas. The top still depicts Rajalakshmi and Venkatesan as their characters.

After the success of India's first sound film Alam Ara (1931), its director Ardeshir Irani wanted to venture into South Indian cinema. In the same year, he chose H. M. Reddy, his former assistant, to direct the first South Indian sound film, which would later become the first Tamil-Telugu film Kalidas, (Note: Until September 2012, Bhakta Prahladha, the first Telugu sound film was believed to have been released on 15 September 1931, which would make it the first South Indian sound film released. However, film journalist Rentala Jayadeva proved Bhakta Prahlada was actually released on 6 February 1932, making Kalidas the first to be released.) based on the life of the Sanskrit poet and playwright Kalidasa. (Note: While French film historian Yves Thoraval claims that Kalidasa lived during the fourth century, historian Selvaraj Velayutham and Encyclopaedia of Indian Cinema by Ashish Rajadhyaksha and Paul Willemen state that he lived in the third century. Edwin Gerow, writing for Encyclopædia Britannica, states that Kalidasa flourished in the fifth century.) Irani produced the film under Imperial Movi-Tone. P. G. Venkatesan was chosen to play the title role. L. V. Prasad—who later founded Prasad Studios—appeared in a comic role as a temple priest. Theatre artiste T. P. Rajalakshmi was chosen to play the female protagonist; according to film historian Randor Guy, she was the "automatic choice to play the heroine." Before this, Rajalakshmi had acted in many silent films, and Kalidas was her first sound film. Supporting roles were played by Thevaram Rajambal, T. Susheela Devi, J. Sushila, and M. S. Santhanalakshmi. The sound was recorded by German technicians using German-made equipment. Kalidas was shot in Bombay (now Mumbai) on the sets of Alam Ara; it was completed in eight days, using either 6,000 feet (1,800 m) or 10,000 feet (3,000 m) of film, as sources differ. (Note: According to Sri Lankan historian Sachi Sri Kantha, Kalidas used 10,000 feet (3,000 m) of film, while Film News Anandan told The Hindu's M. L. Narasimham in 2006 that it used 6,000 feet (1,800 m). However, Anandan's 2004 book Sadhanaigal Padaitha Thamizh Thiraipada Varalaru gives its final length as 10,000 feet (3,000 m).) Film historian Film News Anandan stated that Kalidas "was produced in a hurry, and was technically flawed."

The film's actors spoke a variety of languages, including Tamil (Rajalakshmi), Telugu (Venkatesan) and Hindi (Prasad). Because Venkatesan's first language was Telugu, and he could not correctly pronounce Tamil words, his dialogue was in Telugu. Rajalakshmi mentioned in an interview that H. M. Reddy filmed and went on to produce a Telugu film titled Kalidas, indicating that it might be a Telugu production. Film critic and journalist Kalki Krishnamurthy, in his review of the film for Ananda Vikatan, noted that the film had dialogues in Telugu, with Tamil songs featured at the beginning, middle, and end, but no Tamil speech. According to Guy, Irani was initially unsure if the German sound recording equipment would record the Tamil language; to assuage his doubts, he had some actors speak and sing in Tamil, with Venkatesan in Telugu. Because the equipment had already been used to record Hindi, he had other actors speak that language; the equipment recorded each language clearly. Owing to the use of multiple languages, sources including Film News Anandan, Birgit Meyer, and Guy have refused to call Kalidas the first Tamil sound film; Guy instead called it India's first multilingual film. In the 2010 book Cinemas of South India: Culture, Resistance, Ideology, Sowmya Dechamma states that Telugu dialogues were included in the film, apparently to "increase its market potential in the two important language markets of southern India."

== Music ==
Kalidas featured fifty songs composed and written by Bhaskara Das. Film historian S. Theodore Baskaran mentions in his 1996 book, The Eye of the Serpent: An Introduction to Tamil Cinema, that all of the songs were in Tamil. Birgit Meyer contradicted Baskaran in her 2009 book Aesthetic Formations, stating that the film had Telugu songs, a view that was supported by Sowmya Dechamma in Cinemas of South India: Culture, Resistance, Ideology.

Although the film was based on mythology, it featured compositions from much later time periods, such as those by the Carnatic musician Tyagaraja, and Indian National Congress publicity songs. Film News Anandan stated Reddy was "probably pleased to add on anything artistic that came his way. Relevance was hardly an issue." The 2008 book Tamil Cinema: The Cultural Politics of India's Other Film Industry by Selvaraj Velayutham and Aesthetic Formations by Birgit Meyer stipulate that the nationalistic songs featured in the film had nothing to do with the main plot, while Randor Guy states during that period, "Historical accuracy wasn't as important as the music. It wasn't uncommon for the deities to sing modern poems or nationalist songs." Baskaran noted that this marked the "beginning of cinema being used as an instrument of political propaganda."

The patriotic song "Gandhiyin Kai Rattiname" ("The Charkha that [Mahatma] Gandhi handles"), also known as "Raattinamam ... Gandhi Kai Bhanamaam ...", was sung by T. P. Rajalakshmi, and was unrelated to the story of Kalidas; the song extolled the charkha (spinning wheel), a Gandhian symbol of nationalism. Rajalakshmi also performed two of Tyagaraja's compositions, "Enta Nerchina" and "Suraragadhara", the latter of which was based on the Sankarabharanam raga, for the film. (Note: For "Enta Nerchina", B. Kolappan of The Hindu says the song is set in the raga Udayaravichandrika. In contrast, V. Balakrishnan of Ananda Vikatan says the song is set in the Harikambhoji raga.) Another song which Rajalakshmi performed, "Manmada Baanamadaa", became immensely popular, and was described by Guy as "the emotional outburst of love by the heroine". Another song, "Indhiyargal Nammavarkkul Eno Veen Sandai", spoke about the Indian independence movement and the need for unity among Indians. Guy described "Manmada Baanamadaa" as the "first hit song of Tamil Cinema".

== Release ==
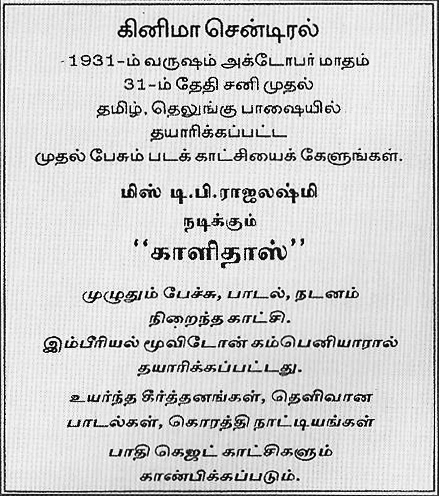
Pre-release advertisement for Kalidas

An advertisement announcing the release of Kalidas was published on 30 October 1931 in The Hindu, where it was proclaimed that the film was the "first talkie to be screened in the city with Tamil and Telugu songs". Kalidas was first released theatrically at the Madras (now Chennai) based theatre Kinema Central (now known as the Murugan Theatre) on 31 October 1931, during the festive occasion of Diwali and coincided with the Civil Disobedience Movement.

When the film reels were taken to Madras, thousands of people gathered at the city's central railway station and followed the reel box along Wall Tax Road to Kinema Central, throwing rose petals, breaking open coconuts, and burning incense. The posters of the film read, Tamil Telugu pesi paadu padam (English: "Tamil Telugu talking singing film"). An earlier attempt at producing a Tamil sound film, a four-reel short (identified by S. Theodore Baskaran as Korathi Dance and Songs), was screened alongside Kalidas as a side attraction. It starred Rajalakshmi, and the gypsy dancer Jhansi Bai. In a 2015 interview with The Times of India, Rajalakshmi's daughter Kamala stated that during the film's release, "people in Madras used to stand outside theatres for a distance of about 4-5km to witness [Rajalakshmi] acting in her first pesum padam. She was welcomed with a roar here. Her name was announced from speakers installed on roads and autorickshaws, as a talkie was something new for the people."

Kalidas was commercially successful, grossing over ₹75,000 and easily covering its budget of ₹8,000 (worth ₹1.5 crore in 2021 prices) according to a 2013 estimate by Hindu Tamil Thisai. Film producer and writer G. Dhananjayan said the film succeeded because it was a "novelty for the audience to witness an audio visual with dialogues and songs of their language".

In his 1997 book Starlight, Starbright: The Early Tamil Cinema, Randor Guy described Kalidas as a "crude experiment" that had poor lip sync; when characters opened their mouths there was no sound, and when dialogue or song was heard, artistes remained silent. He said the public did not care about technical niceties and flocked to see the film. Kalki Krishnamurthy, in his review for Ananda Vikatan, noted that he was awestruck by the costumes used. He praised Rajalakshmi's performance and her dancing but criticised her singing, saying that she had to go see a doctor to get her vocal cords fixed. The Tamil newspaper Swadesamitran printed a favourable review for Kalidas on 29 October 1931, two days prior to its theatrical release, where the reviewer, in contrast to Krishnamurthy's comments, appreciated Rajalakshmi's singing.

== Legacy ==
The arrival of sound in South Indian cinema, with the release of Kalidas, triggered a migration of theatre artists into cinema. Kalidas was the only South Indian film to be produced and released in 1931. No print or gramophone record of the film is known to survive, making it a lost film. The Indian Express stated in 2014 that the film had "turned to dust" long before the National Film Archive of India was established in 1964. The only remaining artefacts include a few stills, advertisements, and an image of the cover of the songbook. As of December 2002, Film News Anandan had preserved several photographs related to the film.

Kalidas was a major breakthrough in Rajalakshmi's career, and made her a "bankable singing star". Other films based on the life of Kālidāsa include the Kannada film Mahakavi Kalidasa (1955), which won the National Film Award for Best Feature Film in Kannada, the Hindi film Kavi Kalidas (1959), the Telugu film Mahakavi Kalidasu (1960), the Tamil film Mahakavi Kalidas (1966), and the Kannada film Kaviratna Kalidasa (1983).

== See also ==
- Keechaka Vadham, the first South Indian silent film
- List of lost films

== Bibliography ==
- Baskaran, Sundararaj Theodore (1996). The Eye of the Serpent: An Introduction to Tamil Cinema. East West Books. OCLC 243920437.
- Dechamma C. C., Sowmya; Prakash, Elavarthi Sathya (2010). Cinemas of South India: Culture, Resistance, Ideology. Oxford University Press. ISBN 978-0-19-806795-5.
- Ganesan, Sivaji; Narayana Swamy, T. S. (2007) [2002]. Autobiography of an Actor: Sivaji Ganesan, October 1928 – July 2001. Sivaji Prabhu Charities Trust. OCLC 297212002.
- Gokulsing, K. Moti; Dissanayake, Wimal (2013). "The Civil Disobedience Movement and cinema". Routledge Handbook of Indian Cinemas. Routledge. ISBN 978-0-415-67774-5.
- Guy, Randor (1997). Starlight, Starbright: The Early Tamil Cinema. Chennai: Amra Publishers. OCLC 52794531.
- Meyer, Birgit (2009). Aesthetic Formations. Palgrave Macmillan. ISBN 978-0-230-60555-8.
- Pillai, Swarnavel Eswaran (2015). Madras Studios: Narrative, Genre, and Ideology in Tamil Cinema. SAGE Publications. ISBN 978-93-5150-212-8.
- Rajadhyaksha, Ashish; Willemen, Paul (1998) [1994]. Encyclopaedia of Indian Cinema. Oxford University Press. ISBN 0-19-563579-5.
- Rajan, Chandra (1997). The Complete Works of Kālidāsa Volume One: Poems. Sahitya Akademi. ISBN 978-81-7201-824-5.
- Sastry, K. N. T. (1993). L.V. Prasad : a monograph. Wiley Eastern. ISBN 978-81-224-0504-0.
- Thoraval, Yves (2000). The cinemas of India. Macmillan India. ISBN 978-0-333-93410-4.
- Velayutham, Selvaraj, ed. (2008). Tamil Cinema: The Cultural Politics of India's Other Film Industry. Routledge. ISBN 978-0-415-39680-6.
