= Jeevan Mukthi =

- Poster
- Directed by: T. V. Neelakantan
- Written by: Balijepalli Lakshmikantha Kavi
- Produced by: S. S. Vasan
- Starring: P. Suribabu; Bezawada Rajarathnam
- Cinematography: Sailen Bose
- Edited by: J. L. Sircar
- Music by: Rajeswara Rao
- Production company: Gemini Studios
- Distributed by: Gemini Pictures Circuit
- Release date: 1942
- Country: India
- Language: Telugu

Jeevan Mukthi is a 1942 Indian Telugu-language film produced by S. S. Vasan of Gemini Studios.

== Plot summary ==
Jeevudu, an untouchable cobbler, leads a saintly life with his wife Seva and son Bhavudu. Because of his devotion, Vishnu appears before him every day, and eats whatever he is given as a prasad offering. Santha, the daughter of the proud and powerful Rajaguru, learning of this, visits his hut to discover whether it is true. When she witnesses it for herself, she informs her father of this wonder. Angry that his daughter has visited the house of an untouchable, he locks her up. He then informs Jeevudu that the king's mother was performing a cheppula nomu (Chappal vrata) and needs a thousand sandals by next morning. Jeevudu and his family work all night, but can only make a few sandals. They fall asleep from exhaustion; when they awaken the next morning, they find the house full of sandals.

Rajaguru lies to the king, persuading him to order Jeevudu to be imprisoned and to have his hands cut off and his eyes put out; Bhavudu is stoned. With the help of a flower girl, Santha escapes from the chamber where her father has confined her. She tells Seva what has happened to her husband and her son. When Seva goes to the jail and sees her blinded husband, she puts her own eyes out. At this point, Vishnu and his consort Sridevi appear in the form of tribals. They restore their devotees; Rajaguru realizes the error of his ways; and all ends happily.

== Cast ==
Cast adapted from the song book

- P. Suribabu as Jeevudu
- Master Viswam as Bhavudu
- Balijepalli Lakshmikantha Kavi as Rajaguru
- D. Lakshmaiah Chowdhary as King
- V. V. Sadagopan as Vishnu
- L. S. Narayana as Yagnenna
- Dr. K. Sivaramakrishnaiah as Somanna
- Madhava Rao as Gruddivadu
- V. Lakshmikantha Kavi as Sachidananda
- C. L. Narasimha Shastri as Brahmananda
- Koteswara Rao as Family Elder
- V. Kondala Rao as Pothudu
- Janardanam as Veeradu
- Bezawada Rajarathnam as Seva
- Kamala Kumari as Santha
- Annapurna as Sridevi
- Santha as Bhudevi
- Lakshmi Devi as Flower Girl

== Soundtrack ==
The music was composed by Rajeswara Rao and the lyrics were written by Balijepalli Lakshmikantha Kavi. There are two songs in the film.

- Aaragimpa Raara Vidu Aaragimpa Raara - P. Suribabu and group
- Veligimpuma Naalo Jyothi Thilakinchaga O Deva - P. Suribabu
