= Bhakta Jayadeva =

1961 film

- Theatrical release poster
- Directed by: P. V. Rama Rao; P. S. Ramakrishna Rao (Supervision)
- Written by: Samudrala Sr (dialogues)
- Based on: Life of Jayadeva
- Produced by: Komaravolu Narayana Rao; G. Paramdhama Reddy
- Starring: Akkineni Nageswara Rao; Anjali Devi
- Cinematography: Venkat
- Edited by: B. Harinarayanaiah
- Music by: Saluri Rajeshwara Rao
- Production company: Lalitha Kala Nikethan
- Release date: 7 April 1961
- Country: India
- Language: Telugu

Bhakta Jayadeva is a 1961 Indian Telugu-language biographical film, based on the life of 12th Century Sanskrit Poet Jayadeva, produced by Komaravolu Narayana Rao, G. Paramdhama Reddy under the Lalitha Kala Nikethan banner and directed by P. V. Rama Rao, while Ramakrishna took care of direction supervision. It stars Akkineni Nageswara Rao, Anjali Devi and music composed by Saluri Rajeshwara Rao.

The same picture was already made Telugu in 1938 with the same title, which was produced by Andhra Cinetone at Visakhapatnam and directed by Bengali director Hiren Bose. It stars Surabhi Kamalabai, Santha Kumari, V. Venkateswarlu, Rentachintala Satyanarayana in pivotal roles. It was also dubbed into Bengali as Padmabati Joydeb and released in 1968.

== Cast ==
- Akkineni Nageswara Rao as Jayadeva
- Anjali Devi as Padmavathi
- Relangi as Paraserudu
- V. Nagayya as Krishnadas
- C.S.R
- Mikkilineni as Lakshmanasena Maharaju
- Mukkamala as Kamakeetu
- Vangara
- Allu Ramalingaiah
- Sandhya as Rani
- Surabhi Kamalabai
- E. V. Saroja as Dancer

== Crew ==
- Art: Gokhale
- Choreography: Vempati, Pasumarthi, Gopikrishna
- Lyrics - Dialogues: Samudrala Sr
- Playback: Ghantasala, P. Susheela, Jikki A. M. Rajah, P. B. Sreenivas, Madhavapeddi Satyam, Ramanujacharyulu
- Music: S. Rajeswara Rao
- Editing: B. Harinarayanaiah
- Cinematography: Venkat
- Producer: Komaravolu Narayana Rao, G. Paramdhama Reddy
- Screenplay - Director: P. V. Rama Rao
- Supervision: P. S. Ramakrishna Rao
- Banner: Lalitha Kala Nikethan
- Release Date: 7 April 1961

== Soundtrack ==
Bhakta Jayadeva

Film score by S. Rajeswara Rao
- Released: 1961
- Genre: Soundtrack
- Length: 37:12
- Producer: S. Rajeswara Rao

Music composed by S. Rajeswara Rao. Lyrics were written by Samudrala Sr.

S. No	Song title	Singers	length
1	"Nee Madhu Murali"	Ghantasala	2:42
2	"Naadu Prema Bhagyarasi"	Ghantasala, P. Susheela	3:24
3	"Priye Chaaruseele"	Ghantasala	4:58
4	"Dayaganumaa Jaga Deesaa"	Ghantasala	4:03
5	"Jaya Jagadeesa"	Ghantasala	3:57
6	"Rathi Sukhasaare"	Ghantasala, P. Susheela	2:22
7	"Yaaramithaa Vanamaalina"	Ghantasala, P. Susheela	3:27
8	"Hara Hara Jayakara"	M. Seetaramulacharyulu	5:29
9	"Pralaya Payodhijale"	Ghantasala	6:50

== Other ==
- VCDs & DVDs on - SHALIMAR Video Company, Hyderabad
