= Sri Rama Paduka Pattabhishekam =

1932 film

Srirama Paduka Pattabhishekam
- శ్రీరామ పాదుకా పట్టాభిషేకం
- Directed by: Sarvottam Badami
- Produced by: Sagar Movietone
- Starring: Yadavalli Suryanarayana; Surabhi Kamalabai; C. S. R. Anjaneyulu
- Production company: Sagar Movietone
- Release date: 1932
- Country: India
- Language: Telugu

Sri Rama Paduka Pattabhishekam (transl. The coronation of Rama's footware) is a 1932 Indian Telugu-language Hindu mythological drama film directed by Sarvottam Badami. It is notable for being the second Telugu talkie film. The film stars renowned stage actor Yadavalli Suryanarayana as the Hindu deity Rama, alongside C. S. R. Anjaneyulu and Surabhi Kamalabai.

The film is based on an episode from the Ramayana, depicting Rama's fourteen-year exile in the forest and Bharata's symbolic coronation of Rama's padukas (footwear) on the throne, symbolizing Rama's rule in his absence. It holds significance as the first Telugu film based on the Ramayana, with Yadavalli Suryanarayana as the first actor to portray Rama and Surabhi Kamalabai as the first actress to play Sita in Telugu cinema.

== Plot ==
Lord Rama with Sita and Lakshmana leave the palace at Ayodhya as directed by their father Dasaratha. Kaikeyi, Bharata's mother and Dasaratha's second wife has asked that as a boon of her husband in order to place Bharata, Rama’s step-brother on the throne. Bharata refuses to sit on the throne and goes to the forest to get Rama back. Rama reminds Bharata of his duty and declines to go back as he intends fulfilling his fourteen years of banishment in the forest. Bharata then insists on taking Rama’s padukas (slippers) and returns to Ayodhya. He places Rama's Padukas on the throne, suggesting the rightful king and waits for Rama’s eventual return.

== Cast ==
- Yadavalli Suryanarayana as Rama
- C. S. R. Anjaneyulu
- Surabhi Kamalabai as Seetha

== Production ==
Sarvottam Badami, a filmmaker from Bangalore, directed Sri Rama Paduka Pattabhishekam under contract with Sagar Movietone, marking the second Telugu talkie. The film featured Yadavalli Suryanarayana in the role of Lord Rama, while Surabhi Kamalabai made her acting debut as Sita, becoming the first actress to portray the role in Telugu cinema.

== Release ==
Sri Rama Paduka Pattabhishekam premiered on 24 December 1932 at the Kinema Theatre in Madras. The film was later released in Vijayawada (then Bezwada) at the Durga Kala Mandir during the Sankranti festival in 1933.

Due to the limited availability of cinemas at the time, films were often shown by transporting projectors from one village to another, which resulted in only three prints being produced for Sri Rama Paduka Pattabhishekam. A newspaper advertisement for the film's screening at Durga Kala Mandir declared, "A Telugu person’s life is incomplete without watching this film." The advertisement also noted the film's success in Madras, stating that after a week of screenings, the producers in Bangalore requested an extended run through a telegram. The film's success in Madras and Vijayawada was heavily promoted.

The success of Sri Rama Paduka Pattabhishekam helped establish Sarvottam Badami as a prominent director. Following this, he directed Galava Rishi (Tamil) and Sakunthala (Telugu) for Sagar Movietone, further enhancing his reputation in the South Indian film industry.

== Remakes ==
The film was remade twice, once in 1945 as Paduka Pattabhishekam directed by Kadaru Nagabhushanam, with C. S. R. Anjaneyulu playing the role of Rama this time. The 1965 Paduka Pattabhishekam was directed by Vasanta Kumara Reddy.
