= Bhakta Prahlada (1942 Telugu film) =

1942 film by Chitrapu Narayana Rao

- Theatrical release poster
- Directed by: Chitrapu Narayana Rao
- Production company: Sobhanachal productions
- Release date: 30 January 1942
- Country: India
- Language: Telugu

Bhakta Prahlada (transl. Prahalada, the devotee) is a 1942 Telugu-language film produced by Sobhanachal Banners and directed by Chitrapu Narayana Rao. The film follows Prahlada, a devotee of Vishnu in Hinduism. This is the second film based on the same story, but with more advanced technicians. The story is about the devotee prahlada.

== Cast ==
- Vemuri Gaggaiah
- Rajeswari
- Narayan Rao
- Krishnaveni
- G. Varalakshmi

== See also ==
- Bhakta Prahlada (1932), The first Telugu talkie and old Bhakta Prahlada movie
