= Kolachalam Venkata Rao =

Indian politician (1850–1931)

- Born: 28 February 1850; Kaddirampura, Ballari, Karnataka
- Died: 28 December 1931 (aged 81); Ballari, Karnataka
- Other name: Kolachala Vencata Rao
- Occupations: Social reformer, politician, freedom fighter
- Known for: Women welfare
- Political party: Indian National Congress

Kolachalam Venkata Rao (28 February 1850 – 28 December 1931) was a freedom fighter and social reformer of Madras Presidency. He represented the state of Karnataka in the first session of the Indian National Congress. He was one of the early social reformers who encouraged widow remarriages and female education. He was the elder brother of Kolachalam Srinivasa Rao.

== Early life ==
Kolachalam Venkata Rao belonged to the family of Mallinātha Sūri whose family stood unequalled in the Sanskrit lore. His Grand Father Subba Satri was a moralist and a writer on religious topics. His father Sethupathi Sastry was the Dewan of Anegundi Samsthana of the Vijayanagara empire. He received his Early Education from the Government School, Bellary. He then joined the Presidency College, Madras under Mr. Thompson for the B.A. but had to give up due to ill health. He was a school Master till 1874 and later served as the Head Clerk, District Munsiff Court until 1878. He then served as the Deputy Tahsildar and Sub-Magistrate. He later became a Pleader

== Freedom movement and politics ==
He represented the state of Karnataka in the first session of the Indian National Congress in 1885, held in Bombay. He played an important role in establishing newspaper printing press both in Kannada and Telugu languages. He went to Bombay to present a valedictory to the Marquis of Ripon on behalf of the People of Ballari. He was one of the guests to attend the Coronation ceremony of King Edward VII which took place in Westminster Abbey, London on 9 August 1902.

In 1902, the ceded districts of Bellary were affected by an outbreak of plague, leading to nearly 10,000 deaths. Kolachalam Venkata Rao took charge as The Chairman of Bellary Municipality and rendered services, helping the poor with basic needs. He was elected to serve as a member of the Madras Legislative Council during 1903–1904. He was a patron of the British Committee of the INC in London and Also Central Hindu College, Banaras. The British had conferred him the title of Right Honourable, which he returned in 1916 in response to their oppressive treatment of Bal Gangadhar Tilak. He was closely associated with Bal Gangadhar Tilak, Dadabhai Naoroji, Kandukuri Veeresalingam, Tanguturi Prakasam Pantulu and several other national leaders.

In addition to his political interests, He was fond of travel. He had visited Ceylon, Burma, Siam, Great Britain and several parts of the Continent. He was a benefactor to the Transvaal deportees

== Social reforms and philanthropy ==
Remarriage of widows was not appreciated in the society during those days but Venkata Rao opposed this by quoting verses from the Hindu Dharma shastra to prove his point. A Staunch Puritan, he started a regular crusade in 1884 against the dancing girls being engaged in Nautch Parties. In 1889 he arranged three widow remarriages, which had triggered the orthodox society who then decided to boycott him and stop taking part in his freedom activities. However, he educated them about the importance of widow remarriage and the society members later agreed to carry out widow remarriages every year.

He constructed a town hall in Bellary and furnished it with a free library. He also constructed a widow ashram and brought a house to be used as a girls' school. He donated 4 acres of land for the construction of a football stadium in Bellary, which is now called as BDAA grounds.

== Death ==
Kolachalam Venkata Rao died on 28 December 1931, a main road in Bellary is named after him in his memory.
