= Draupadi Vastrapaharanam (1936 film) =

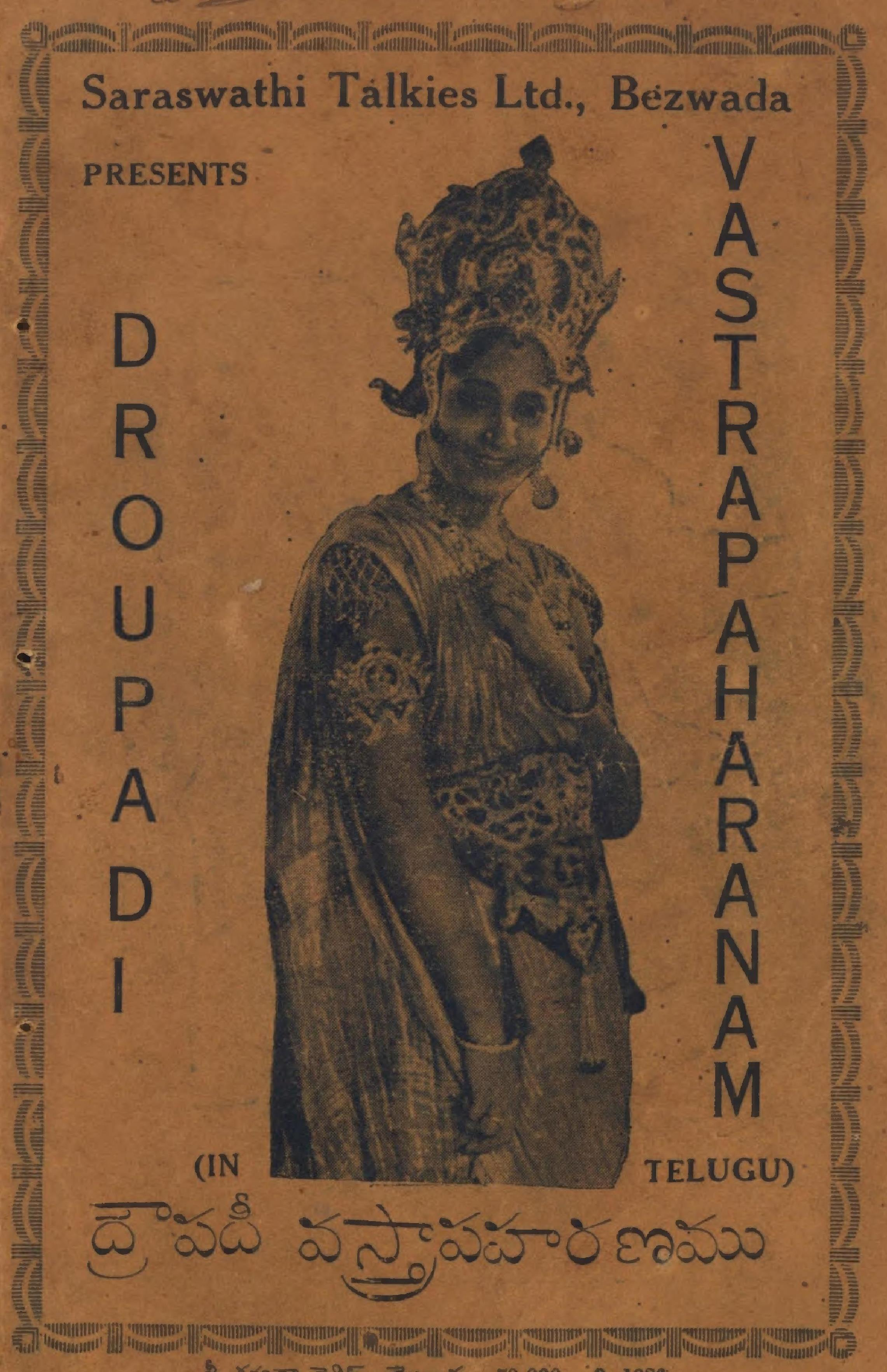
- Poster of Draupadi Vastrapaharanam
- ద్రౌపదీ వస్త్రాపహరణం
- Directed by: Hanumappa Viswanath Babu
- Written by: Pasumarthi Yagna Narayana Sastry; Malladi Achutha Ramana Sastry
- Produced by: Parupalli Seshayya; Kurukuri Subba Rao
- Starring: Kannamba; Yadavalli Suryanarayana; Chilakalapudi Seetha Rama Anjaneyulu; Nellori Nagaraja Rao; Vemuri Gaggayya
- Cinematography: S. C. Shinde
- Edited by: Baburao Bhadorkar
- Music by: Bhimavarapu Narasimha Rao
- Release date: 29 February 1936
- Country: India
- Language: Telugu

Draupadi Vastrapaharanam (transl. Draupadi's Disrobement) is a 1936 Indian Telugu-language film directed by H. V. Babu, brother-in-law of noted filmmaker H. M. Reddy. It was made to compete with Draupadi Manasamrakshanam (1936), which was a super hit, whereas Draupadi Manasamrakshanam failed. The film is remembered for the rendition of poems with acting performances by C. S. R. Anjaneyulu and Yadavalli Suryanarayana.

== Plot ==
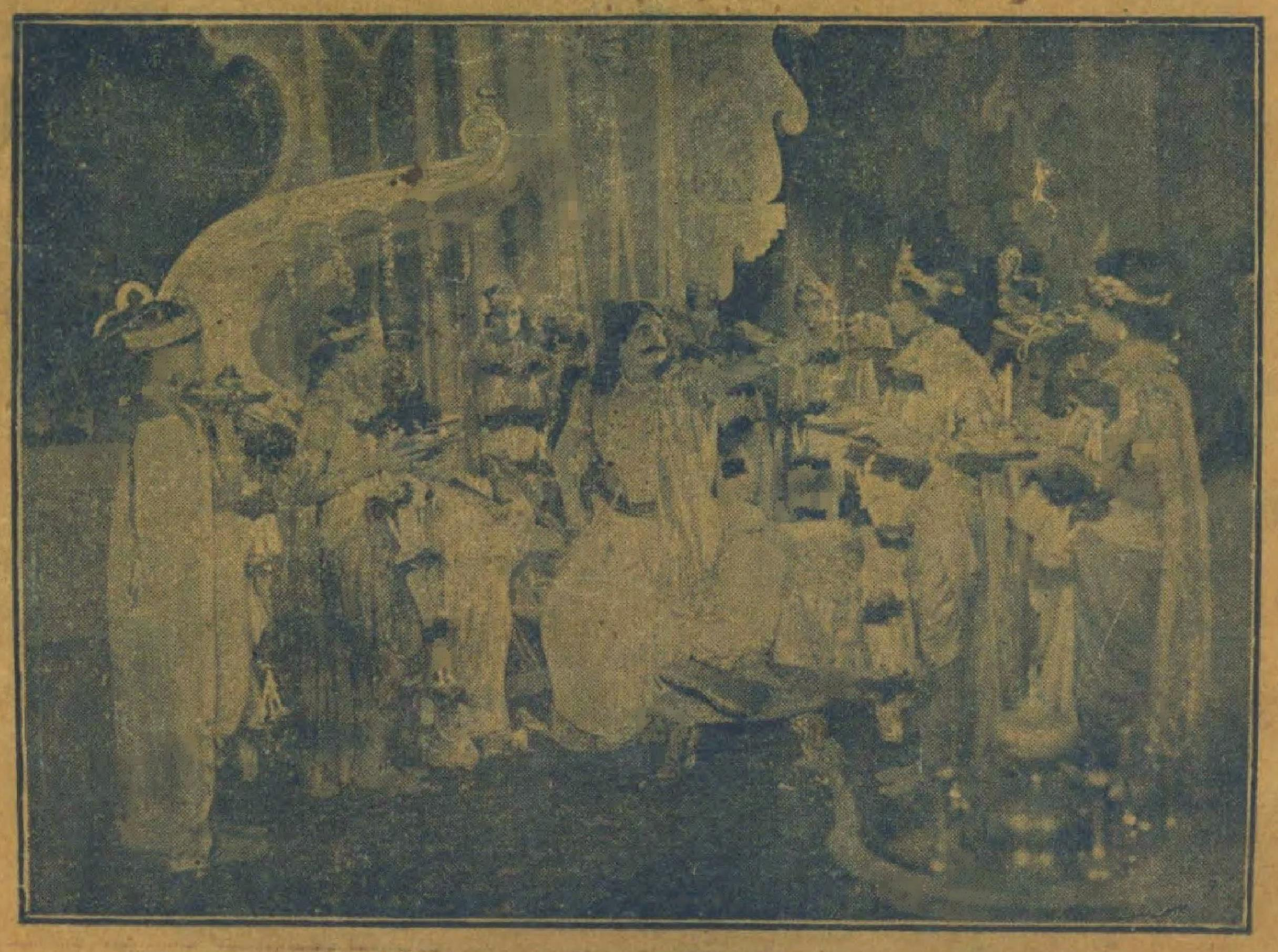
A scene from the film in which Duryodhana is woken up by the servants

The story is based on the Mahabharata episode of Draupadi Vastrapaharanam. It depicts the attempted humiliation of Draupadi by the Kauravas. It occurs after Dharmaraju and other Pandavas lose her to Duryodhana over a game of dice. As the Kauravas try to disrobe, she prays to Lord Krishna. He comes to her aid by making her sari longer and longer.

== Cast ==
| Character | Actor/Actress |
|---|---|
| Draupadi | Kannamba |
| Duryodhana | Yadavalli Suryanarayana |
| Krishna | Chilakalapudi Seetha Rama Anjaneyulu |
| Shakuni | Nellori Nagaraja Rao |
| Dharmaraju | Choppalli Suryanarayana Bhagavathar |
| Dussasana | Lanka Krishna Murthy |
| Bhima | Dommeti Suryanarayana |
| Sishupala | Vemuri Gaggayya |
| Narada | P. Suri Babu |
| Vidura | Arani Satyanarayana |
| Aswathama | Kadaru Nagabhushanam |
| | Dommeti Satyanarayana |
| Satyabhama | Dasari Ramatilakam |
| | Vemuri Parabrahma Sastry |
| | Katari Shakantala |
| | Puvvula Nagarajakumari |

== Production ==
The production of this film has some historical importance in the Telugu film industry, wherein two production houses competed for the same theme of Draupadi Vastrapaharanam in Mahabharata to produce films in 1936.

Kurukuri Subbarao of Saraswati Publishing House and Parupalli Venkata Seshayya launched Saraswati Talkies Ltd. with Gudavalli Ramabrahmam as the production controller. After some debate they arrived at making the film version of Bellary Raghavacharya's popular stage play, Draupadi Vasthrapaharanam.

By then, Kavali Gupta of Sri Lakshmi Films already acquired the rights and signed Bellary Raghava to play the key role. Subbarao and Seshayya had decided to go ahead with their project. They signed the famous stage actor of Vijayawada Yadavalli Suryanarayana to play Duryodhana.

When Kavali Gupta saw their announcement, he changed his film’s title as Draupadi Manasamrakshanam and hurried the production. This film was produced in Bombay. However it was released three weeks after Saraswati Talkies venture and failed at the box-office.

Subbarao and Seshayya approached H. M. Reddy to direct their film. Since he was busy, Reddy agreed to be the supervisory director with his brother-in-law H. V. Babu as the director. Pasumarthi Yagna Narayana Sastry, editor and publisher of the famous Telugu film magazine Chitrakala was chosen to write the screenplay and additional lyrics and poems. Yadavalli Suryanarayana has clean diction, expressive rendition of poems and natural acting was his forte. He made his screen debut in 1932 with Paduka Pattabhishekam. They signed C. S. R. Anjaneyulu for Sri Krishna's role as he showed variance in each role he played. The other actors were chosen selectively for the film characters.

The sequence Dussasana pulling Draupadi's Sari was shot by throwing a bundle of tied saris from a height by a man away from the camera sitting on a plank and were shot separately by Cinematographer S. C. Shinde. They were joined at the editing table by Baburao Bhadorkar.
