= Kamadhenu (film) =

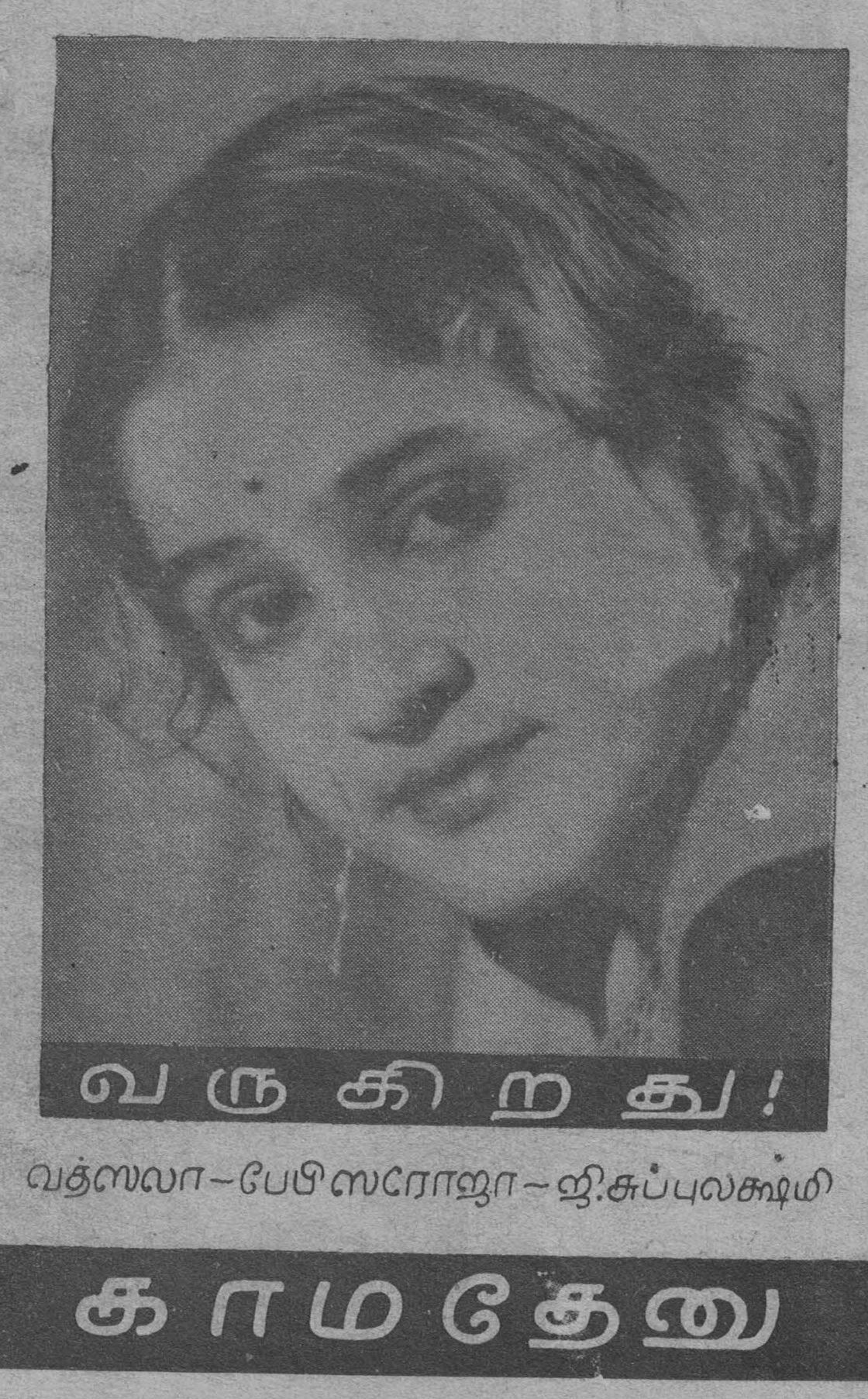
- Poster
- Directed by: Nandalal Jaswantalal
- Screenplay by: K. Subramanyam
- Story by: Mohanlal Thave
- Produced by: N. Rajagopalan
- Starring: Baby Saroja; Vatsala; K.B. Vatsal
- Cinematography: Adi M. Irani
- Music by: Rajeswara Rao; Kalyanaraman
- Production company: The Madras United Artists Corporation
- Distributed by: Chitra Talkies
- Release date: 1941
- Country: India
- Language: Tamil

Kamadhenu is a 1941 Tamil-language film directed by Nandalal Jaswantalal and featuring Baby Saroja, Vatsala, K. B. Vatsal and G. Pattu Iyer in the main roles.

== Cast ==
Credits adapted from the Film's songbook

- Shrimathi Vatsala as Anuradha
- Baby Saroja as Kamdhenu & Chandi (Pappayi's son)
- G. Subbulakshmi as Pappayi
- K. N. Kamalam as Lady Doctor Kamala Bai
- K. B. Vatsal as Chandramohan
- G. Pattu Iyer as Zaminder Sir Vasantha Raja
- M. R. S. Mani as Duraisami
- C. N. Sadasivan as Professor Rangasami
- Jolly Kittu Iyer as Head Clerk
- S. Ramachandra Iyer as College Principal
- Kolathu Mani as Mowali Driver
- Master Balachandar as Raju (Hotel Boy)
- S. V. Venkatraman as Sadhu
- G. V. Sharma as Lawyer

== Production ==
The film was almost a family venture. K. Subramanyam's brother K. Viswanathan, who was the owner of Chitra Talkies, produced the film while K. Subramanyam wrote the story and dialogues. K. Viswanathan also featured as the hero. His wife Vatsala was the heroine. Their daughter Baby Saroja featured as a child artiste.

Subramanyam engaged Nandalal Jaswantalal, who was a successful director of Hindi films, to direct this film. This was the only Tamil film he directed.

== Soundtrack ==
S. Rajeswara Rao and Kalyanaraman scored the music under supervision of Papanasam Brothers - Papanasam Sivan and Papanasam Rajagopala Iyer, both of whom also wrote the lyrics. Background music was composed by Anil Biswas, the songs were recorded by C. E. Biggs.

| No | Song | Singer | Length(m:ss) |
|---|---|---|---|
| 1 | "Naran Ethir Partha Nargalam" | Shrimathi Vatsala | |
| 2 | "Mathana Parai Mathizh Singara" | Shrimathi Vatsala, K. B. Vatsal | |
| 3 | "Andaranga Vazhkaiye" | Shrimathi Vatsala, K. B. Vatsal | |
| 4 | "Vaarai Vaarai Mohana" | Shrimathi Vatsala, K. B. Vatsal | 02:55 |
| 5 | "Pattatai Mani Joray Nane" | G. Subbulakshmi | |
| 6 | "Mathivathanane Vaarai En Duraiye" | G. Subbulakshmi | 02:27 |
| 7 | "Thaye... Thaye" | Shrimathi Vatsala | |
| 8 | | K. B. Vatsal, Shrimathi Vatsala, Chorus | |
| 9 | | Shrimathi Vatsala, K. B. Vatsal | |
| 10 | | Shrimathi Vatsala, Baby Saroja | |
| 11 | | G. Subbulakshmi, Master Balachander, Baby Saroja, Others | |
| 12 | | S. V. Venkatraman | |
| 13 | | Master Balachander, Baby Saroja, Shrimathi Vatsala, S. V. Venkatraman | |
| 14 | | Baby Saroja, Master Balachander | |
| 15 | | Baby Saroja, Master Balachander, Drunk People | |
| 16 | | Baby Saroja, Drunk People | |
| 17 | | (Baby Saroja) Kakkudi Dance Song | |
| 18 | | Shrimathi Vatsala, K. B. Vatsal, Baby Saroja, G. Pattu Iyer | |
