= 2nd Venice International Film Festival =

Italian film festival in 1934

- Festival poster
- Location: Venice, Italy
- Founded: 1932
- Festival date: 1–20 August 1934
- Website: Website

Venice Film Festival chronology
- 3rd 1st

The 2nd Venice International Film Festival was held between 1 and 20 August 1934. This was the first year the festival had a competition with the Coppa Mussolini being awarded for Best Foreign Film and Best Italian Film.

== In-Competition films ==
- Amok by Fyodor Otsep
- Broken Dreams by Robert G. Vignola
- Ekstase by Gustav Machatý
- It Happened One Night by Frank Capra
- La signora di tutti by Max Ophüls
- Le Grand Jeu by Jacques Feyder
- Little Women by George Cukor
- Man of Aran by Robert J. Flaherty
- Queen Christina by Rouben Mamoulian
- The Private Life of Don Juan by Alexander Korda
- Teresa Confalonieri by Guido Brignone
- Viva Villa! by Jack Conway

== Awards ==
- Best Foreign Film: Man of Aran by Robert J. Flaherty
- Best Italian Film: Teresa Confalonieri by Guido Brignone
- Golden Medal: Stadium by Carlo Campogalliani
- Best Director: Gustav Machatý for Ecstasy
- Best Actor: Wallace Beery for Viva Villa!
- Best Actress: Katharine Hepburn for Little Women
- Best Animation: Walt Disney for Funny Little Bunnies
- Special Recommendation:
  - Death Takes a Holiday by Mitchell Leisen
  - The Invisible Man by James Whale
  - The World Moves On by John Ford
  - Viva Villa! by Jack Conway
- Best Short Film: Voulez-vous être un assassin? by Marcel De Hubsch
- Best Cinematography: Dood water by Andor von Barsy
- Special Prize: Seconda B by Goffredo Alessandrini
- Honorary Diploma:
  - En stilla flirt by Gustaf Molander
  - Leblebici horhor aga by Muhsin Ertuğrul
  - Nippon Nippon by Katsudo Shashin
  - Se ha fugado un preso by Benito Perojo
  - Savitri by C. Pullaiah
  - Seeta by Debaki Bose
