= Madhurakavi Bhaskara Das =

Vellaisamy Thevar, known professionally as Madhurakavi Bhaskara Das, (1892–1952) was a popular Tamil film lyricist. In 1931 he wrote lyrics for H. M. Reddy's Kalidas movie. He was the first lyricist in the Tamil film industry.

== Filmography ==
Das wrote the lyrics for the music in the following films.

- Kalidas - 1931
- Valli Thirumanam - 1933
- Bojarajan - 1935
- Chandragasan - 1936
- Raja Thesinggu - 1936
- Usa Kalyanam - 1936
- Dhevadas - 1937
- Sathi Agaliya - 1937
- Rajasegaran - 1937
- Kodaiyn Kadal - 1941
- Navena Thennairaman - 1941
