= Surabhi Kamalabai =

Indian actress

Surabhi Kamalabai (1913–1977) was an Indian actress who worked in Telugu theatre and Telugu cinema. She has the distinction of being the first Telugu actress in a talkie film with Bhakta Prahlada (1932), directed by H. M. Reddy. She played the role of Leelavathi, the wife of Hiranyakasipa. She later acted in about 30 films, including Savitri (1933), Pathala Bhairavi (1951), Malliswari (1951), Illarikam (1959) and Velugu Needalu (1961).

She belonged to the well known Surabhi drama company, in which drama is not only a livelihood but a profession and an art form. There were about 50 drama families during the 1920s to 1950s in Andhra Pradesh. They toured different places, stayed for some time and gave a series of programmes in the nearby towns.

== Filmography ==
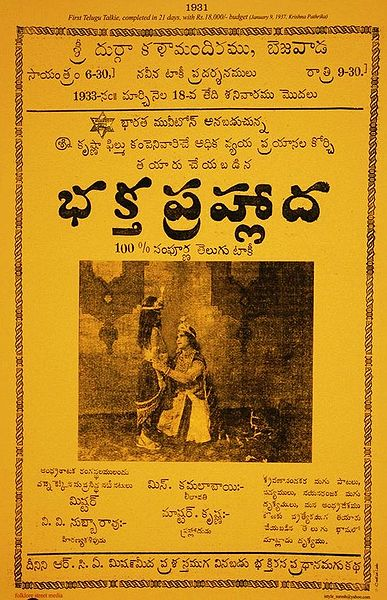
Bhakta Prahlada (1932), her debut film poster

1. Bhakta Prahlada (1931) as Leelavathi (debut)
2. Sri Rama Paduka Pattabhishekam (1932) as Goddess Seetha
3. Sakuntala (1932/33) as Sakuntala
4. Pruthvi Putra (1933)
5. Savithri (1933)
6. Shaher Ka Jadoo (1934) as Laila
7. Veera Abhimanyu (1936)
8. Be Kharab Jan (1936)
9. Do Diwane (1936)
10. Draupadi Manasamrakshanam (1936)
11. Bhakta Jayadeva (1938)
12. Tukaram (1938)
13. Bhookailas (1940) as Vishnu Maya
14. Patni (1942)
15. Keelugurram (1949)
16. Malliswari (1951)
17. Patala Bhairavi (1951)
18. Mangala (1951)
19. Kathal (1952)
20. Manavati (1952)
21. Rohini (1953)
22. Devadasu (1953)
23. Vayyari Bhama (1953)
24. Pelli Naati Pramanalu (1958)
25. Mangalya Balam (1958)
26. Jayabheri (1959)
27. Illarikam (1959)
28. Vagdanam (1961) as Bujjamma
29. Velugu Needalu (1964)
