= Chandala Kesavadasu =

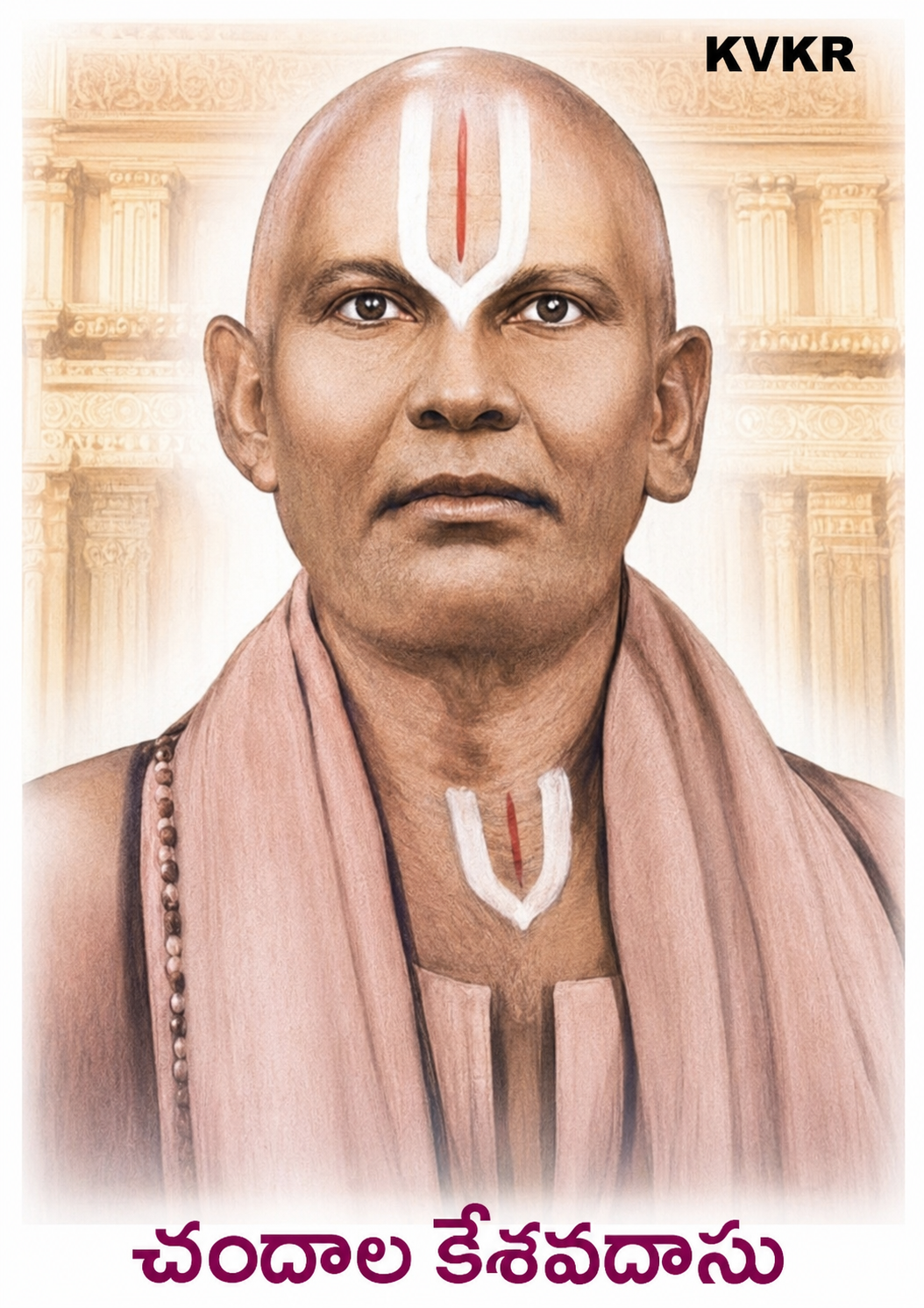

Background information
- Born: 20 June 1876; Jakkepalli, Hyderabad State, British India (present-day Telangana, India)
- Died: 14 May 1956 (aged 79)

Chandhala Kesavadasu (20 June 1876 – 14 May 1956) is the first lyricist in the history of the Telugu Film Industry. In addition to dialogues and poems, H.M. Reddy made Chandala Kesavadasu to pen songs for Bhakta Prahlada (1931). The great poet Kesavadasu, thus remains in the history of Telugu Cinema to have penned its first song Thanaya Itulan Thagadhura Palukaa...for the first Telugu talkie film Bhakta Prahlada (1931 film) that was released in the year 1931. The other songs include Parithaapambu.. and Bheekarambagu Naa.. in the same film and Bhale Manchi Chowka Beramu.. (Sri Krishna Tulabaram). Parabrahma Parameshwara.. used as an invocation song for most of the Telugu dramas is also penned by him. He wrote dialogues and lyrics to Kanakatara film in 1937.

He was born to Chandala Laxminarayana and Papamma in Jakkepalli Village, Kusumanchi Mandal, Khammam district, Telangana, India.
