= Sakunthala (1932 film) =

1932 Telugu film by Sarvottam Badami

Sakuntala
- Directed by: Sarvottam Badami
- Starring: Surabhi Kamalabai; Yadavalli Suryanarayana; Bakurapanda Venkata Rao; Nellore Nagaraja Rao
- Production company: Select Pictures
- Release date: 1932
- Country: India
- Language: Telugu

Sakunthala is a 1932 Telugu-language film directed by Sarvottam Badami. Produced by Select Pictures, it was based on the renowned play Abhignana Sakuntalam by Kalidasa, the film features Surabhi Kamalabai in the titular role of Sakuntala and Yadavalli Suryanarayana as Dushyanta. It is among the first ten talkie films made in Telugu cinema.

An advertisement promoted it as "another extraordinary Telugu talkie for the Andhra region, surpassing even the grandness of Paduka Patabhisheka." Notably, Sakuntala marked the beginning of comedic roles in Telugu cinema. It features fishermen who catch a fish that has swallowed Sakuntala's ring, leading to hilarious interactions.

== Cast ==
- Surabhi Kamalabai as Sakuntala
- Yadavalli Suryanarayana as Dushyanta
- Bakurapanda Venkata Rao
- Nellore Nagaraja Rao
