= Birgit Meyer =

German professor of religious studies

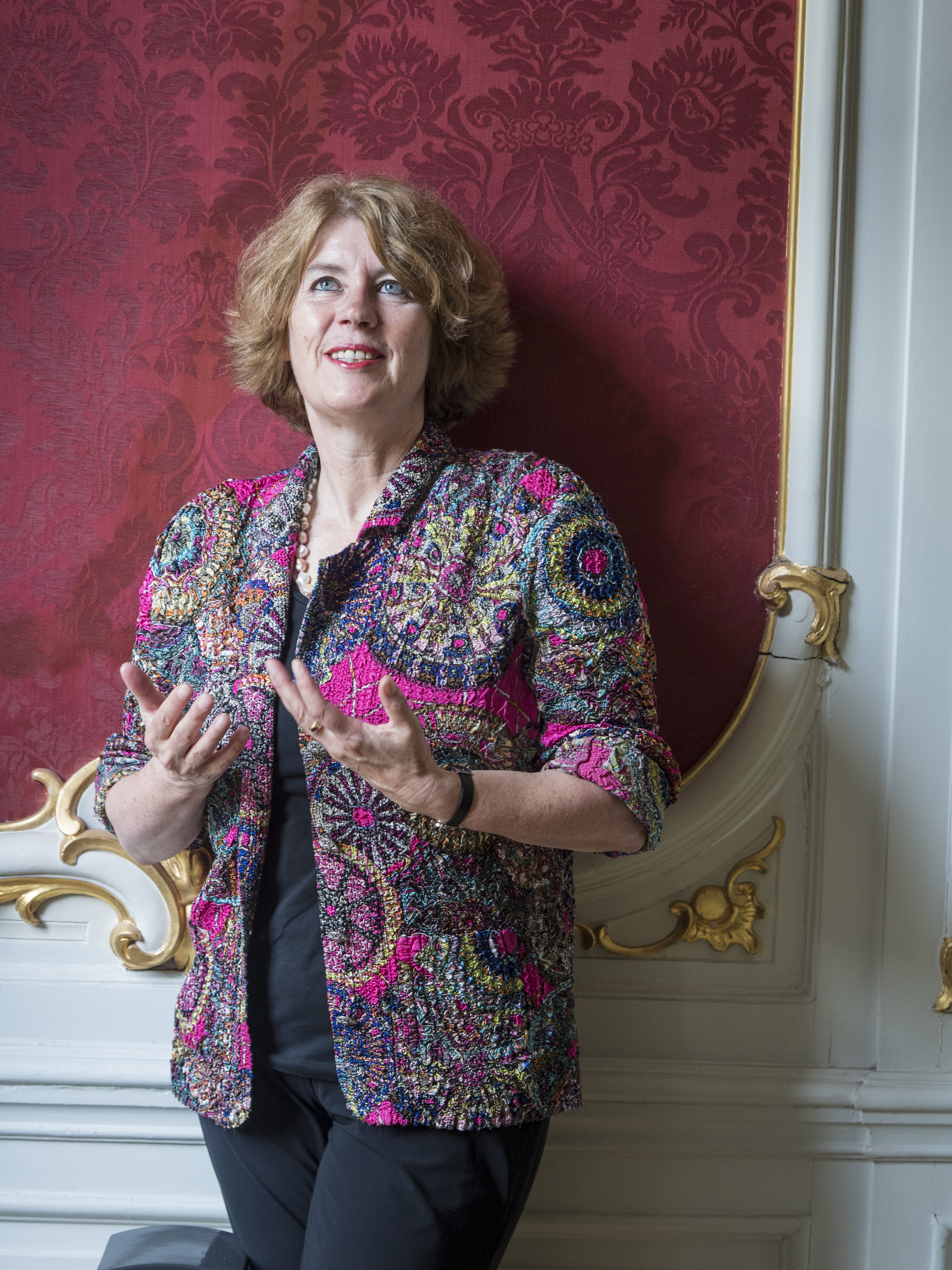
Birgit Meyer (2015)

Birgit Meyer (born 21 March 1960) is a German professor of religious studies at Utrecht University.

== Career ==
The idea of the single, white researcher getting into a world foreign to her is outdated, I think.

Meyer was born on 21 March 1960 in Emden, Germany. She studied comparative religion, pedagogy, and cultural anthropology at the University of Bremen and the University of Amsterdam. She earned her PhD at the latter university in 1995 under doctoral advisors J. Fabian and H.U.E. Thoden van Velzen, with a thesis titled: Translating the Devil. An African Appropriation of Pietist Protestantism. The Case of the Peki Ewe, 1847–1992. She was appointed as professor of religious studies at Utrecht University in 2011. She previously spent over 20 years living in Ghana studying Pentecostalism and religious change.

Meyer has been a member of the Royal Netherlands Academy of Arts and Sciences since 2007. In 2012 she received the Anneliese Maier Award by the Humboldt Foundation. In April 2015 Meyer won the Academy Professors Prize of the Royal Netherlands Academy of Arts and Sciences and received a 1 million euro grant. In 2015 she was one of four winners of the Dutch Spinoza Prize and received a 2.5 million euro grant.
