= Chandal, Bangladesh =

Coordinates: 23°10′0″N 91°0′0″E

Chandal is a town in Barisal Division, Bangladesh. It is located at 23°10'0N 91°0'0E with an altitude of 9 metres (32 feet).
