= Prema Vijayam =

1936 Telugu film by Kruthivennu Nageswara Rao

Premavijayam
- Directed by: Kruthivennu Nageswara Rao
- Written by: Kruthivennu Nageswara Rao
- Starring: Prabhala Krishnamurthy; P. S. Sarma; P. Rama Rao; K. Rangarao; M. Ramachandramurthi; Nukaraju; Rajyam; B. Rajalakshmi
- Music by: Munuvanti Venkateswara Rao
- Production company: Indian Art Cinetone
- Release date: 20 July 1936
- Running time: 133 minutes
- Country: India
- Language: Telugu

Prema Vijayam (transl. Triumph of love) is a 1936 Telugu-language drama film directed by Kruthivennu Nageswara Rao. Produced by Indian Art Cinetone, it is recognized as the first social film in Telugu cinema. At a time when mythological films dominated the industry, Prema Vijayam introduced contemporary social themes, making it a groundbreaking work in Telugu cinema.

Although Prema Vijayam did not succeed commercially, it remains a significant milestone as the first social film in Telugu cinema. Its daring approach to depicting real-life societal challenges opened the door for future social films, making it a precursor to films that addressed contemporary issues.

== Cast ==
- Prabhala Krishnamurthy
- P. S. Sarma
- P. Rama Rao
- K. Ranga Rao
- M. Ramachandramurthi
- Nookaraju
- Rajyam
- B. Rajalakshma Bhagavathar

== Production ==
The film was adapted from Nageswara Rao's original stage play and is considered the first Telugu film to break away from mythological themes. The plot centers on two lovers who face opposition from their parents before finally coming together. It is often viewed as a precursor to the Rohini and Vauhini Telugu melodramas.

== Soundtrack ==
The music was composed by Munuvanti Venkateswara Rao with lyrics written by poet Vedula Satyanarayana Sastry.

== Legacy ==
Despite its significance, the film was a commercial failure. Nevertheless, Prema Vijayam paved the way for the future of social films, inspiring filmmakers to explore contemporary issues in cinema. The story revolved around themes of college life, student relationships, and local elections, addressing modern social issues like widow remarriage, which was a major topic of discussion in society at the time. The film also reflects a desire for independence in the colonial era.
