= Balayogini =

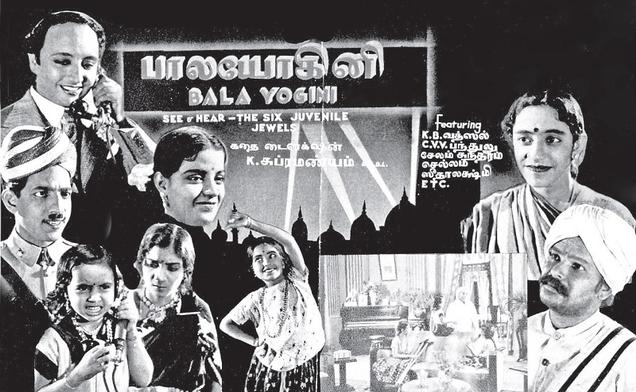
- Poster in Tamil
- Directed by: K. Subramanyam
- Written by: K. Subramanyam
- Produced by: K. Subramanyam
- Starring: Baby Saroja; C. V. V. Panthulu; K. B. Vatsal; R. Balasaraswathi
- Cinematography: Sailen Bose; Kamal Ghosh; Art Director: Batuk Sen
- Edited by: Dharam Veer
- Music by: Moti Babu; Maruti Seetharammayya
- Production company: Madras United Artists Corp
- Release date: 5 February 1937
- Running time: 210 minutes
- Country: India
- Language: Tamil

Balayogini (transl. Girl Saint) is a 1937 Indian film made in Tamil and Telugu languages. It was directed by K. Subramanyam. It is one of the earliest Tamil films to be set in a contemporary social setting and to advocate reformist social policies. It is considered the first children's talkie film of South India.

== Production ==
Subramanyam was influenced by the reformist ideals of his father C.V. Krishnaswamy Iyer. He was moved by the social conditions around him to make reform-oriented films. Balayogini (lit. Child Saint) was made to expose the plight and suffering of widows in middle class Brahmin communities in Tamil Nadu. Subramanyam produced this film under his "Madras United Artists Corporation" banner to express his criticism of the existing social norms and his disapproval of priesthood. He wrote the story, screenplay & dialogues and directed it himself. He cast his niece Saroja as the titular character. The film was started in 1936 and released in 1937. The completed film was 19,000 feet (210 minutes runtime) in length.

== Plot ==
Sarasa's (K. R. Chellam) father is arrested by police for being unable to clear his debt. She goes to the sub collector's (K. B. Vatsal) house to ask for help. The collector's widowed sister Janaki and her niece (Baby Saroja) take pity on her. They are driven out of the house by the angry collector. They take refuge in the house of their low-caste servant Munuswamy. Munuswamy dies and Janaki cares for his children as her own. This causes outrage in the conservative society and Munuswamy's house is burned down by a mob. The child Saroja changes everyone's mind with her arguments.

== Tamil cast ==
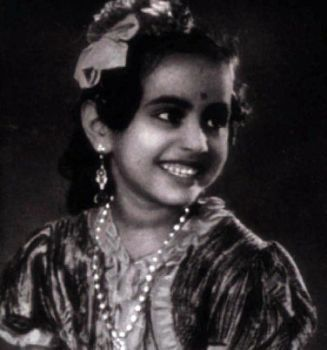
"Baby Saroja" in Balayogini

Male

- C. V. V. Panthulu as Munisamy
- Bharathan as Gopala Iyer
- K. B. Vatsal as Balachandra
- Salem Sundaram as Mahlinga Sastri
- Mani Bhagavathar
- Brahamdal

Female

- K. R. Chellam as Sarasa
- Baby Saroja as Saroja
- Bala Saraswathi as Kamala
- Baby Rukmini
- K. N. Rajalakshmi
- Seethalaksmi as Janaki

== Telugu cast ==
- Baby Saroja
- Baby S. Varalakshmi
- Arani Satyanarayana
- Vangara
- Kamala Kumari
- Thilakam

== Soundtrack ==
The music was by Moti Babu and the lyrics were Papanasam Sivan. ‘Kanney papa, kanimuthu paapa’, rendered by Baby Saroja as a lullaby to her doll, became popular.

- Kannae Paappa
- Kshamiyimpumaa O Maama Kshamiyimpumaa
- Radhey thozhi

== Reception ==
The film was released on 5 February 1937 to critical and public acclaim. "Baby" Saroja was hailed as "Shirley Temple of India". Many girls were named "Saroja" after her. The film's success inspired a number of socially themed films in South India.

Reviewing the film in the magazine Jaganmohini in February 1937, reviewer Vatsakumari wrote:

After seeing Saroja's acting, Shirley Temple's talent does not impress anymore. Saroja's appearance, acting and words give us the impression of a lonely new flower's fragrance. There is no doubt that behind her and the other children's acting success is the director K. Subramaniam...It can be said such a complete Tamil film has not been made so far.

A similar review was written in Manikodi magazine in its February 1937 issue:

..The four year old faces make us remember rose buds. Their laughter reminds us of Jasmine flowers waiting for the Margazhi sunrise. Baby Saroja's quick responses capture our heart. We should congratulate the director Sri Subramanyam for making such a successful film with children.

Film historian Theodore Baskaran has called it the most significant Tamil film of its period.
