= Baby Saroja =

Indian actress (1931–2019)

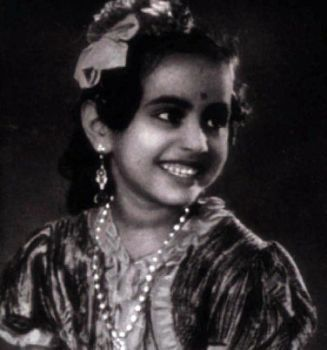
- Screenshot from 1937 Tamil film Balayogini
- Born: Saroja; 28 January 1931
- Died: 14 October 2019 (aged 88)
- Years active: 1937–1941
- Spouse: V. Ramamrutham
- Children: 3

Saroja Ramamrutham (Tamil:சரோஜா ராமாமிருதம் 28 January 1931 – 14 October 2019), better known by her screen name Baby Saroja, was an Indian actress who was known for her roles as a child actor in Tamil films of the late 1930s. She was known as the "Shirley Temple of India" due to her popularity.

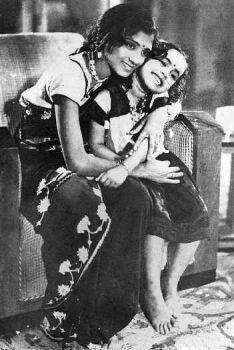
Screenshot with K. R. Chellam

== Family ==
She hailed from a family of artists who were among the pioneers of Tamil cinema. Saroja was the niece of popular Indian film director K. Subrahmanyam. Her parents K. Viswanathan (brother of K. Subrahmanyam) and Alamelu Viswanathan were also film artists. Both of them featured in the film Kamadhenu with the screen names K. B. Vatsal and Vatsala respectively.

== Film career ==
Saroja started acting in films when she was only 6 years of age. Her acting in the 1937 hit Balayogini became a sensation. The lullaby Kanne paapaa was a hit. That year, some parents named their new born girl child as Saroja. The fame she got in Balayogini enabled her to act in a second film, Thyaga Bhoomi which was also a hit. She danced to a song sung by her mother, a Tamil adaptation by Papanasam Sivan, of Krishna Nee Begane. The Hindu, in a review of the film in 1939, wrote: “Acting honours go to Baby Saroja (no more a baby, but a cheery vivacious girl) who is at home acting or dancing. Her actions are expressive and her movements spontaneous.” Two years later, in 1941, she starred in Kamadhenu

== Other achievements ==
Baby Saroja learnt to play the veena under Karaikudi Sambasiva Iyer.

After moving to Bombay (now Mumbai), she went on to master Ikebana, the Japanese art of flower arrangement.

At 70, she trained under S. Rajam in painting.

== Filmography ==
She featured in three Tamil films.

- Balayogini (1937)
- Thyagabhoomi (1939)
- Kamadhenu (1941)

== Death ==
Saroja Ramamrutham died on 14 October 2019 due to age-related health complications. She was 88.
