= Andor von Barsy =

Hungarian filmmaker

Andor von Barsy was a Hungarian filmmaker. He was born in Budapest on March 14, 1899, and died in Munich on December 24, 1965. He worked as a cameraman and photographer for many years before working on his documentaries. He is often referred to as an influential avant-garde filmmaker because of his experimental documentary films. He attended school in Germany, but most of his work centers around the Netherlands, specifically Rotterdam. Hoogstraat (or "High Street"), his 1930 film is set in Rotterdam and takes the form of a city symphony film. He won the 1957 German Film Award for Best Cinematography for his work on Jonas.

== Films ==
The City That Never Rests (1928)

- The City That Never Rests (1928)
- The Municipal Gas Plant Rotterdam (1928)
- High Street (1930)
- Sailors’ Wives (1930)
- Pfaff Sewing Machine (1930)
- Terra Nova (1932)
- Dead Water (1934)
- Rotterdam (1934)
- Spring Song (1936)
- Olympia Part 1 & 2 (1936–38)
- Between Arrival and Departure (1938)
- Jonas (1957)
