= Vemuri Gaggayya =

Indian actor

- Born: 1895; Vemuru, Guntur district, Andhra Pradesh, India
- Died: 30 December 1955 (aged 60); Hyderabad, India
- Occupations: Actor; Thespian

Vemuri Gaggayya (1895–1955) was an Indian actor and singer known for his work in Telugu cinema, and Telugu theatre.

Gaggayya was an important member of the "Mylavarama Bala Bharathi Nataka Samajam" in Mylavaram, Krishna district during 1913–28. Through "Mylavaram Theatre", Gaggayya became a household name for mythological roles. His theatrical performances made C. Pullayya to persuade him to enter the film industry.

In 1933, he acted in the film Sati Savitri, directed by Pullayya, as Yama. The film received an honorary diploma at the 2nd Venice Film Festival. His other prominent roles are Kamsa in Sri Krishna Leelalu (1935), Jalandhara in Sati Tulasi (1936), womaniser in Chandika (1940), and Hiranyakasipu in Bhakta Prahlada (1942). He is known for rendering songs such as "Po Bala Pommikan" and "Dhikkaramulu Saituna".

== Early life ==
Gaggayya was born in 1895 at Vemuru in Guntur district, Andhra Pradesh. He lost his father in early childhood. His elder brother tried to educate him but failed in his efforts. He married Ramalaxmi in 1913. During those days, Surabhi Drama Company used to be played throughout the Andhra Pradesh and attracted huge crowds. Influenced by this, he learned music and singing songs. He joined the same troupe and acted in many plays touring with them.

== Personal life ==
His son Vemuri Ramayya was also a stage actor.

== Death ==
Vemuri Gaggayya died in 1955 on 30 December in his native village, Vemuru.

== Filmography ==
1. Savithri (1933) – Yama
2. Seeta Kalyanam (1934)
3. Sri Krishna Leelalu (1935) – Kamsa
4. Draupadi Vastrapaharanam (1936) – Sisupala
5. Sati Tulasi (1936)
6. Mohini Rugmangada (1937)
7. Jarasandha (1938)
8. Bhakta Markandeya (1938) – Yama
9. Chandika (1940) – Giriraju
10. Mahiravana (1940) – Mairavana
11. Dakshayagnam (1941) – Daksha
12. Bhakta Prahlada (1942) – Hiranyakashipu
13. Seeta Rama Jananam (1942) – Ravana
14. Garuda Garvabhangam (1943)
