= Sati Savitri (H. M. Reddy film) =

1933 film by H. M. Reddy

- Directed by: H. M. Reddy
- Produced by: east india film company
- Starring: V. V. Subba Rao; Kanthamani Kanya; K. L. Kantham; Hem Singh
- Production company: Bharath Movie Tone
- Release date: 4 February 1933
- Country: India
- Language: Telugu

Sati Savitri is a 1933 Indian Telugu-language but silent film directed by H. M. Reddy and produced under the Bharath Movie Tone banner. Released on 4 February 1933, the film stars V. V. Subba Rao, Kanthamani Kanya, K. L. Kantham, and L. V. Prasad.

Produced in Bombay, Sati Savitri faced competition from another film of the same name, directed by C. Pullayya and produced by East India Film Company in Calcutta. While Pullayya's version was a major success, H. M. Reddy's film did not perform well at the box office.

== Cast ==
- V. V. Subba Rao as Yama
- Kanthamani Kanya as Savithri
- K. L. Kantham
- Hem Singh
- L. V. Prasad as Satyavantha's friend

== Production ==
The film's poster, released around the time of its debut, emphasized its status as a 100% Telugu talkie, with skilled production techniques. The promotional materials stated, "This is unlike anything you have seen before, featuring renowned actors from Andhra, packed with deep emotional content, and created with remarkable craftsmanship."

== Release ==
Sati Savitri was released on 4 February 1933, with a promotional campaign that highlighted the film's uniqueness and Telugu star cast.
