= Sati Tulasi (1936 film) =

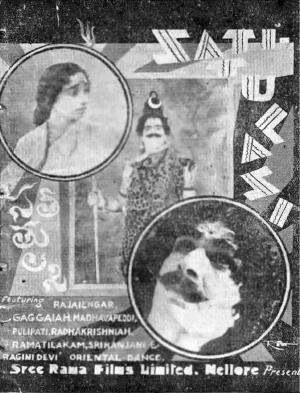
- Theatrical poster of Sathi Tulasi
- Directed by: Chitrapu Narasimha Rao
- Starring: Ghantasala Balaramaiah; Vemuri Gaggaiah; Sriranjani; Rallapalli Natesan Iyar
- Music by: Bhimavarapu Narasimha Rao
- Production company: Sri Rama Films
- Release date: 1936
- Country: India
- Language: Telugu

Sati Tulasi (English: Ever-Present Tulasi) (Telugu: సతీ తులసి) is a 1936 Telugu mythological film directed by Chitrapu Narasimha Rao under the banner of Rama Films.

== Plot ==
The Hindu Mythological story is based on the life of Tulasi and Jalandhara and how she won the affection of Vishnu, a major deity in Hinduism. Veteran actor Vemuri Gaggaiah played the role of Jalandhara, with Sriranjani playing the titular role of Tulasi.
