= Prudhvi Putra =

1933 Telugu film by Pothina Srinivasa Rao

Pruthvi Putra
- Directed by: Pothina Srinivasa Rao
- Written by: Pothina Srinivasa Rao
- Produced by: Pothina Srinivasa Rao
- Starring: Kalyanam Raghuramaiah; Parupalli Satyanarayana; Surabhi Kamalabai
- Production company: Saraswathi Cine Tone
- Release date: 1933
- Running time: 154 minutes
- Language: Telugu

Prudhvi Putra is a 1933 Indian Telugu-language Hindu mythological film written, produced and directed by Pothina Srinivasa Rao. Recognized as one of the first Telugu talkie films financed locally by Telugu people, it features Kalyanam Raghuramaiah, Parupalli Satyanarayana, and Surabhi Kamalabai in prominent roles. The film is based on the story of Narakasura, who requests Lord Krishna to invite him to celebrate his own death, which is joyfully celebrated by others.

Prudhvi Putra marked the film debut of Kalyanam Raghuramaiah, popularly known as Eelapata Raghuramaiah, who is considered the first Krishna of Telugu cinema. Pothina Srinivasa Rao was also the owner of Maruti Talkies, the first cinema hall in Andhra Pradesh located in Bezawada (now Vijayawada).

== Cast ==
- Kalyanam Raghuramaiah
- Parupalli Satyanarayana
- Surabhi Kamalabai
