= Kalyanam Raghuramaiah =

Indian actor (1901–1975)

- Born: Kalyanam Venkata Subbaiah; 5 March 1901; Suddapalli village, Guntur district, Andhra Pradesh, India
- Died: 24 February 1975 (aged 73); Hyderabad, India
- Occupations: Actor; Thespian
- Spouse: Savitri
- Children: Thota Satyavathi (daughter)
- Awards: Sangeet Natak Akademi Award 1973; Padma Shri 1975

Kalyanam Raghuramaiah (5 March 1901 – 24 February 1975), popularly known as Eelapata Raghuramaiah, was an Indian actor, and thespian known for his works in Telugu cinema, and Telugu theatre. A recipient of the Sangeet Natak Akademi Award, and the Padmashri, he was known for the roles of Krishna or Dushyantha, Bhavanisankar, Narada etc. He performed those roles for about 60 years. He indulged in elaborate raga alapana, based on different ragas while rendering padyams.

A fine method actor, he had the ability to sing padyams and songs through whistle, by putting his finger in mouth and producing the whistle or flute sound (meaning Eela in Telugu). He acted in various dramas and gave more than 20,000 stage performances. He was called the "Nightingale of the Stage" by Rabindranath Tagore.

== Early life ==
Kalyanam Raghuramaiah was born in a Kapu family in Suddapalli village of Guntur district and named as Venkata Subbaiah. He was popular during childhood days in playing Raghurama, hence named as Raghuramaiah by Kasinadhuni Nageswara Rao.

== Early career ==
He entered Telugu cinema in 1933 in the film Prudhvi Putra. It is the fifth talkie film in Telugu cinema industry. This is the 1st Telugu movie produced by Telugu person viz. Pothina Srinivasa Rao. He acted as Krishna in many films including Sri Krishna Rayabaram (1960) and in the film Chintamani.

== Personal life ==
He married Savitri, second daughter of Rohini Venkata Subbaiah and Sitamma in 1938 at Bapatla. She inaugurated the statue of her husband Raghuramaiah at Chebrolu, Guntur district on 5 March 2013. At the age of 92 years i.e. on 8 December 2014 she died due to old age at Vijayawada. They have only one daughter viz. Thota Satyavathi, Son-in-law Thota Parvateeswara Rao.

Their grand children are Dr. T.V.S. Gopal, Chintala Ratna, and Gangisetty Raja. His brother-in-law Rohini Venkaiah, Commercial Tax Officer (Retd.) and his wife Dr. Rohini Venkata Sundara Varada Rajeswari, Famous Devotional Writer of several books and Member Sree Hampi Virupaksha Vidyaranya Maha Samsthanam and their son Rohini Mahesh, Devotional Writer of several articles and Member Sree Hampi Virupaksha Vidyaranya Maha Samsthanam date of birth and his son Rohini Harish date of birth and Raghramaiah's date of death is same i.e. 24 February. He toured Malaysia, Japan, Hong Kong and Singapore with a drama troupe in 1972.

== Death and popularity ==
He died of a heart attack in 1975 at the age of 75 years. He was called the "Nightingale of the Stage" by Rabindranath Tagore. A well sheltered bronze statue of him was installed in his honor at Suddapalli village, his birthplace, on 14 February 2014 by his Eldest brother's son Sri. Kalyanam Narasimha Rao, Retd. Senior Manager, Hindustan Aeronautics Limited, Hyderabad and the statue was inaugurated by Sri. Mandali Budda Prasad, Chairman Official Languages, Andhra Pradesh.

== Filmography ==
- Prudhvi Putra (1933)
- Bhakta Kuchela (1935)
- Lanka Dahanam (1936)
- Rukmini Kalyanam (1937)
- Pasupathastram (1939)
- Apavadu (1941)
- Talliprema (1941)
- Gollabhama (1947)
- Madalasa (1948)
- Maya Rambha (1950)
- Mayapilla (1951)
- Prapancham (1953)
- Sati Sakkubai (1954) as Lord Krishna
- Sri Krishna Tulabharam (1955/I) as Sri Krishna
- Chintamani (1956)
- Sri Krishna Maya (1958)
- Sri Krishna Rayabaram (1960)
- Nagarjuna (1961/I)
- Usha Parinayam (1961) as Lord Krishna
- Dakshayagnam (1962/I) as Narada
- Valmiki (1963/I)
- Somavara Vrata Mahatyam (1963) as Narada
- Mohini Bhasmasura (1966) as Indra
- Sri Sri Sri Maryada Ramanna (1967)

== Awards ==
National Honors

- Sangeet Natak Akademi Award in 1973

Civilian Honors

- He was awarded Padmashri by Government of India in 1975.
