= Yadavalli Suryanarayana =

Indian actor

- యడవల్లి సూర్యనారాయణ
- Born: 1888; Guntur, Andhra Pradesh
- Died: 1939 (aged 50–51)
- Occupation: Actor

Yadavalli Suryanarayana (1888–1939) was an Indian actor known for his works in Telugu cinema and Telugu theatre. He made his transition from theater to cinema in 1932. He contributed to the Telugu theatre for over three decades.

== Early life ==
Suryanarayana was born in Guntur, Andhra Pradesh in a Telugu Vaidika Brahmin family. He was the eldest son to Yadavalli Ramakrishnayya and Vengamamba. His elder sister Seetha died early. His other siblings were Gopala Krishna, Venkata Subbu Lakshmi and Rama Rao. His father was an officer in the British Government. Coming from an educated family, Suryanarayana successfully completed matriculation, learned Sanskrit and Telugu along with Panchakavyas. He started performing on stage while he was still a student.

== Early career ==
He toured Andhra Pradesh with Mylavaram Balabharati Nataka Samajam of Vijaywada and Seetharamanjaneya Nataka Samajam of Eluru. He portrayed many roles in plays such as Satyavan in Savithri, Rama in Rama Paduka Pattabhishekam, Dushyantudu in Sakunthala, Sarangadhara in Sarangadhara, Arjuna in Gayopakhyanam, Bahuka in Chitranaleeyam, and as Duryodhana in Veni Samharam, Draupadi Vastrapaharanam and Pandava Udyoga Vijayam plays.

== Death ==
He died at the age of 50 in 1939.

== Filmography ==
- 1932 : Rama Paduka Pattabhishekam as Rama
- 1932 : Sakunthala as Dushyantudu
- 1934 : Seeta Kalyanam
- 1936 : Draupadi Vastrapaharanam as Duryodhana
