= Bhakta Prahlada (1932 film) =

1932 film by H. M. Reddy

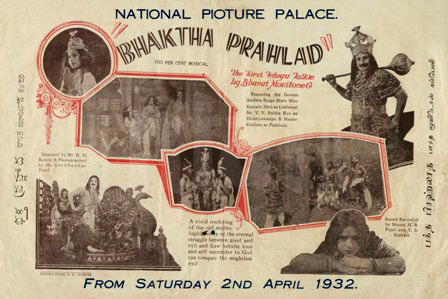
- Theatrical release poster in Madras
- Directed by: H. M. Reddy
- Based on: Bhakta Prahlada
- Produced by: Ardeshir Irani
- Starring: Sindhoori Krishna Rao
- Cinematography: Adi M. Irani
- Music by: H. R. Padmanabha Sastry
- Production company: Imperial Film Company
- Release date: 6 February 1932
- Running time: 108 minutes
- Country: India
- Language: Telugu
- Budget: ₹15,000–18,000

Bhakta Prahlada (transl. Prahlada, the devotee) is a 1932 Indian Telugu-language film based on the story of Prahlada in the Srimad Bhagavatam and Vishnu Purana directed by H. M. Reddy and produced by Ardeshir Irani of Imperial Film Company. It features Sindhoori Krishna Rao as the titular Prahlada, along with Munipalle Subbayya, Surabhi Kamalabai, Doraswamy Naidu, Chitrapu Narasimha Rao, and L. V. Prasad. No complete synopsis of the film is known to survive, but it is an adaptation of a play of the same name.

Having achieved success in Hindi cinema by releasing India's first sound film Alam Ara in 1931, Irani wanted to expand his scope to South Indian cinema. Bhakta Prahlada was released on 6 February 1932, and was positively received by the audience but variedly by critics, who panned its resemblance to the stage version, poor sound recording, and low-quality images.

It is now lost; surviving artefacts include a few stills, advertisements, and reviews. It was believed to be the first sound film of Telugu cinema, until film historian Rentala Jayadeva found out that H. M. Reddy's debut film Kalidas had Telugu dialogues and was released some three months earlier, on 31 October 1931.

== Plot ==
The film is about the Hindu legendary figure Prahlada.

== Cast ==
The cast is adapted from The Hindu:

- Munipalle Subbayya as Hiranyakashipu
- Surabhi Kamalabai as Leelavathi
- Sindhoori Krishna Rao as Prahlada
- Doraswamy Naidu as Indra
- Chitrapu Narasimha Rao as Brahma and Chandamarkulu
- L. V. Prasad as Moddabbai

== Production ==
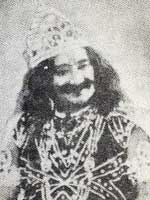
A still from the film

Following his success in Hindi cinema with India's first sound film Alam Ara (1931), the producer Ardeshir Irani decided to expand his career to South Indian cinema; his plan was to release one film each in Telugu and Tamil, which would later be titled Bhakta Prahlada and Kalidas (1931) respectively, in the same year. (Note: Some film historians, including Rentala Jayadeva and Randor Guy, have disagreed to label Kalidas as the first Tamil-language sound film, owing to the use of multiple languages, including Hindi and Telugu. Guy preferred to call it the first Indian multilingual film instead.) He entrusted their direction to his associate H. M. Reddy, a former English teacher at Jagirdars' College, Hyderabad, who in 1927 moved to Bombay (present-day Mumbai) due to a plague spreading in Hyderabad. Reddy later worked as a reflector man for Sarada Film Company; Irani spotted him there and employed Reddy for his Imperial Film Company.

Reddy adapted the story of a popular play of the same name, written either by Dharmavaram Ramakrishnamacharyulu or Surabhi Nataka Samajam. M. L. Narasimham of The Hindu reported in 2011 that Surabhi Theatres, who produced the play, was initially hesitant of the decision without mentioning the rationale. The same cast, all Telugus, was used for the film adaptation. In the history of Telugu sound films, Sindhoori Krishna Rao, who played the titular role of Prahlada, was the first protagonist; meanwhile, L. V. Prasad, also an assistant director, appeared as Prahlada's classmate and was the first actor to be given a comical role.

With a budget of between ₹15,000 (equivalent to ₹4.6 million or US$48,000 in 2023) and ₹18,000 (equivalent to ₹5.5 million or US$57,000 in 2023), Bhakta Prahlada was shot over 18 or 20 days at Imperial Studios, Bombay. Principal photography was done by Adi M. Irani using the Parvo camera. H. R. Padmanabha Sastry from Prabhat Film Company composed the soundtrack, and the lyrics were provided by Ramakrishnamacharyulu and Chandala Kesavadasu, including poems by the 15th-century writer Pothana. Because playback singers were unpopular back then, actors were required to sing their lines with an orchestra located far from the camera. The film's duration was 108 minutes.

== Release, reception, and legacy ==
Bhakta Prahlada was believed to have been released on 15 September 1931, but the film historian Rentala Jayadeva found out that it actually premiered on 6 February 1932 (in Bombay). Jayadeva said it was impossible for the film to release before its 22 January 1932 censorship date. Bhakta Prahlada was released on 2 April 1932 in Madras (present-day Chennai). It was a commercial success but generated varied opinions from critics, owing to its resemblance to the stage version, poor sound recording, and the picture's low quality. The journalist Maddali Sathyanarayana Sarma, who saw the film twice, said the film has almost no differences with the stage version, but praised the sound and songs.

Now a lost film, surviving artefacts include a few stills, advertisements, and contemporary reviews. All early films were shot on highly flammable and silver-containing nitrate film. According to the archivist P. K. Nair, who founded the National Film Archive of India, 70 percent of pre-1950 Indian films are unavailable for archiving, probably due to fire or being stripped for the silver. It was only after 1951 that film producers started using cellulose acetate film, which is considered more fire-resistant. Bhakta Prahlada is regarded as the first released Telugu-language sound film. The story of Prahlada was adapted twice more in Telugu cinema in 1942 and 1967.
