= Dharmavaram Ramakrishnamacharyulu =

Telugu dramatist and playwright (1852–1912)

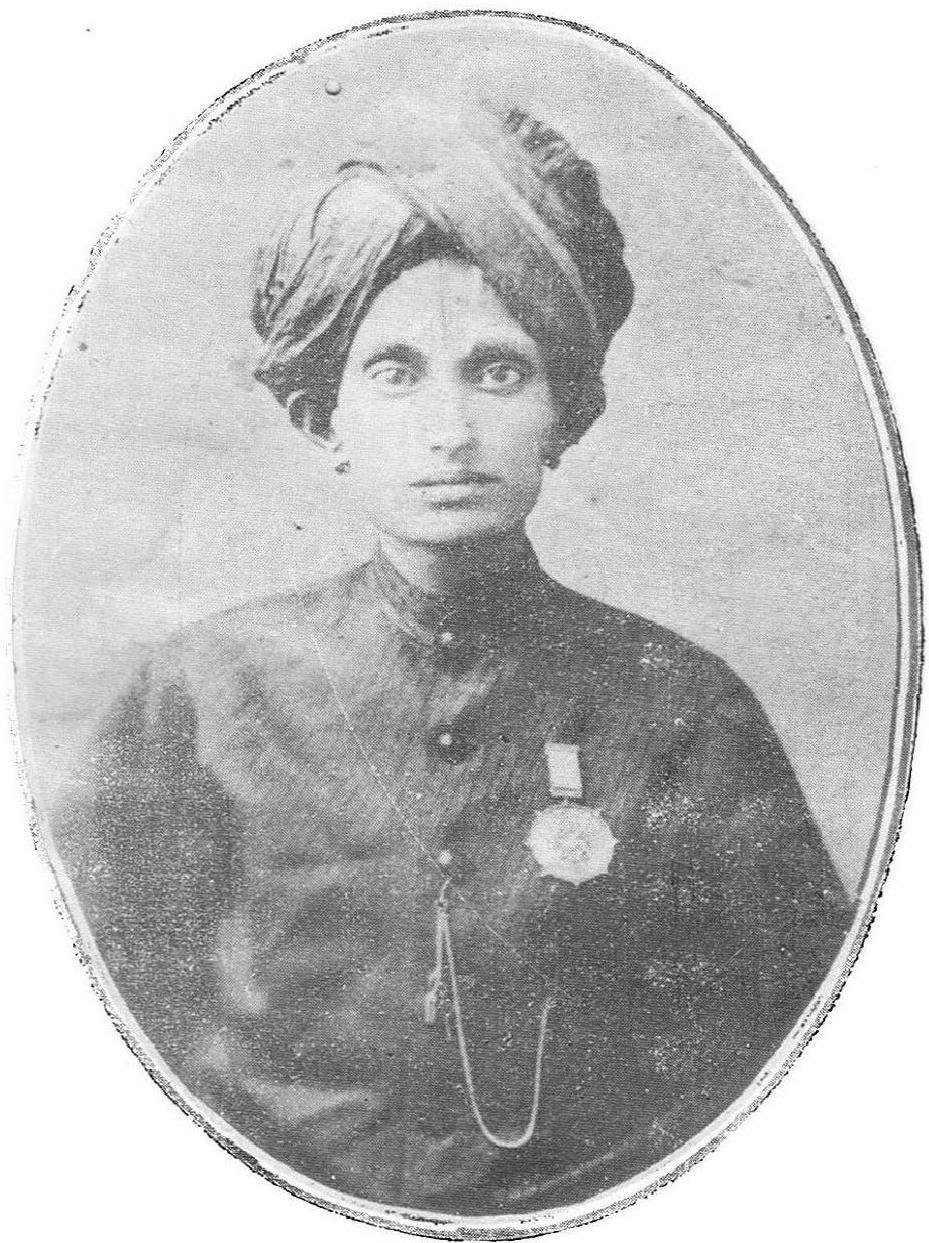
- Born: January 1853; Dharmavaram, Anantapur district
- Died: 30 November 1912 (aged 59); Alur, Hassan district
- Education: Matriculation, F.A.
- Occupations: Lawyer by profession - Telugu scholar, author, director, dramatist of Telugu Natakas
- Spouse: Lakshmidevamma
- Children: Krishnama charyulu, Seesha charyulu, Rangacharyulu, Venugopala charyulu, Antha krishnamacharyuu, Bhogendar krishnamacharyulu
- Relatives: Bellary Raghava, Dharmavaram Gopalacharyulu
- Writing career
- Genres: Playwright, poet, actor
- Subject: Telugu Natakas
- Notable works: Chitranaliyam, Vishadasarangadhar, Prahlada
- Literary movement: 1886 up to 1912

Dharmavaram Ramakrishnamacharyulu (January 1853 – 30 November 1912) was a Telugu playwright from Bellari (formerly Bellary), Karnataka, India. He was known as the "Andhra Nataka Pithamaha" (Grandfather of Andhra Drama) and wrote more than 30 plays.

== Early life ==
Ramakrishnamacharyulu was born in Dharmavaram, a city in the Anantapur district of British India (in present day now as Andhra Pradesh), in 1853. His parents were Krishnamacharyulu and Laxmidevamma. His family name was Komanduru.

He left home and took up acting in Madras (modern-day Chennai), where he studied Shakespeare. After the death of his father when Ramakrishnamacharyulu was 16 years old, he returned to Bellari to assume responsibility for his family's welfare. He began to work as a lawyer (vakil) in the city's cantonment. His first wife died soon after their marriage, and he later married another woman named Laxmidevamma.

Ramakrishnamacharyulu had six siblings in total. His three sisters were named Pedda Seshamma, Chinna Seshamma, and Krishnamma. Pedda Seshamma was the mother of Bellary Raghava. His three brothers were named Dharmavaram Gopalacharyulu, Venkata Krishnamacharyulu, and Seshacharyulu.

== Career ==
After matriculation, Ramakrishnamacharyulu worked in the Municipal High School and the Adoni Taluk Office, and passed the first-grade pleader’s examination and F.A. in 1874.

During the famines of 1871 and 1873, he and his friends established a society called Veera Sangam to assist the affected population; after the famine, this society evolved into a debating society and, in 1888, became the Sarasa Vinodini Sabha.

Influenced by the success of Kannada drama troupes, his brother Gopalacharyulu wrote and staged a Telugu drama. According to available biographies, this drama did not make a significant impact.

His other brother, Krishnamacharyulu, wrote a Kannada drama titled Swapna Niruddhamu, staged in 1886.

Ramakrishnamacharyulu completed the partially written Telugu drama Chitra Naliyam and both directed and acted in its first staging on 29 January 1887. The play received praise and contributed significantly to the development of Telugu theatre.

He went on to write and stage about 29 plays, incorporating songs and poems into his works. In 1891, he took his troupe to Madras and staged performances at Victoria Public Hall.

His work influenced Pammal Sambandha Mudaliar, who later founded the Suguna Vilas Sabha and wrote around 90 Tamil dramas, regarding Ramakrishnamacharyulu as his guru.

The Surabhi Drama Troupe staged many of his works, including Bhakta Prahlada, which was later adapted into the first Telugu talkie.

A theatre in Bellary, named Ramakrishna Vilas, was built in his honour. It was later converted into a cinema and renamed Star Cinema.

== Sources ==
- Dharmavaram Ramakrishnamacharyulu in makers of Indian Literature By Ponangi Sri Rama Apparao, Sahitya Akademi, New Delhi, 1989. ISBN 81-7201-771-5. Complete book online
