= Chandika (film) =

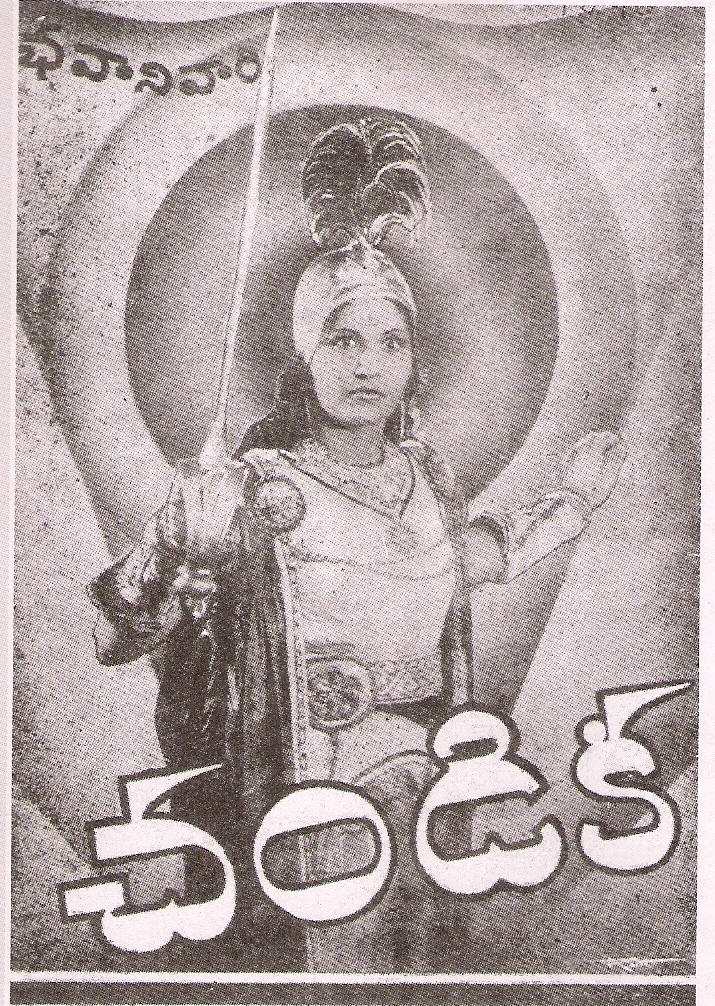
- Directed by: R. S. Prakash
- Written by: Muttaneni Venkata Chennakesavulu (story); Kopparapu Subba Rao (Dialogues )
- Produced by: Mirjapuram Maharaja
- Starring: P. Kannamba; Vemuri Gaggaiah; Bellary Raghava
- Cinematography: Kamal Ghosh
- Music by: Kopparapu Subba Rao
- Release date: 12 April 1940
- Running time: 184 minutes
- Country: India
- Language: Telugu

Chandika is a 1940 Telugu film directed by R. S. Prakash. Veteran actress P. Kannamba portrayed the role of Chandika.

== Plot ==
Chandika (Kannamba) is the princess of a kingdom. She is unhappy with the rule of King Giriraju (Gaggaiah). She wants to dethrone him and have her husband, the prince, become the king. She attracts Giriraju and kills him, but her husband is also killed during the encounter. Unable to control the Minister Veeramallu (Raghava), she finally commits suicide.

== Cast ==
- Kannamba ... Chandika
- Vemuri Gaggaiah ... Giriraju
- Bellary Raghava ... Veeramallu
- T. Lalita Devi
- Peddapuram Raju
- Arani Satyanarayana
- Puvvula Ratnamala
- Dasari Ramatilakam
- Puvvula Anasuya
- Puvvula Chandramouleeswara Rao
- M. Satyanarayana
- V. Venkata Subbarao
- Dasari Lakshmaiah Chowdary
- Master Viswam
- G. Seshagiri Rao
