= Jakkepalli =

Village in India

Jakkepalli is a village in Kusumanchi mandal, Khammam district, Telangana, India. It is located 10 km from Kusumanchi and Paleru, also near the border of Suryapet district.

Famous people who were born in this village include Chandala Keshavadasu (1876–1956), the first lyricist in the history of the Telugu Film Industry.
