= Sati Savitri (C. Pullayya film) =

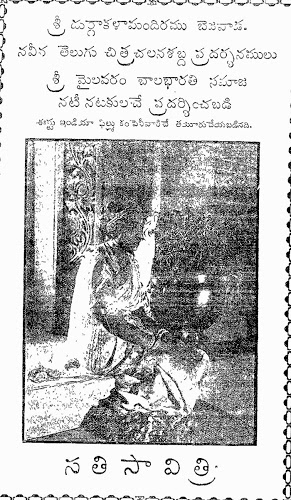
- Directed by: C. Pullayya
- Written by: Mallajosyula Ramana Murthy
- Produced by: East India Film Company
- Starring: Vemuri Gaggayya; Ramatilakam; Nidumukkala Subba Rao; Surabhi Kamalabai
- Release date: 5 February 1933
- Running time: 125 minutes
- Country: India
- Language: Telugu
- Budget: est. ₹75,000
- Box office: est. ₹3 lakh

Sati Savitri is a 1933 Indian Telugu language mythological film directed by C. Pullayya. Based on a popular stage play by Mylavaram Bala Bharathi Samajam, the film was a cinematic adaptation of the Mahabharata's Aranya Parva, focusing on the legendary story of Savitri and Satyavan. It starred stage actors Vemuri Gaggayya as Yama and Dasari Ramathilakam as Savitri.

Produced in Calcutta on a lavish budget of ₹75,000, Sati Savitri was the first film by East India Film Company. The film's release coincided with another adaptation of the same name directed by H. M. Reddy in Bombay, though Pullayya's version emerged as the commercial success. Gaggayya’s portrayal of Yama received widespread acclaim and established him as a major star. The film became a hit, earning recognition both locally and internationally, including an honorary diploma at the 2nd Venice International Film Festival.

== Plot ==
A prince named Aswapati who ruled the kingdom of Madra married Queen Malavi. They did not have a child for many years. Aswapati invoked Savitri, his favourite deity, and by the grace of God, they had a daughter named Savitri. She grew into a lovely maiden and was always playing in the palace and in the forest with her companion Vasantika. She often used to relate her dreams to her companion, and once she portrayed in words the form and beauty of her beloved.

One day, her pet deer escaped into the forest and both Savitri and Vasantika ran after it. They found that the deer was held and kept in captivity by Prince Satyavanta, son of King Dyumatsena, who was collecting fruits and flowers along with his comrade Saradvata. Savitri then recalled the features of the young man whom she saw in the dream and intimated the fact to her companion. Eventually she got her deer back, but she could not forget Satyavanta. She made a portrait of her beloved and worshipped him.

Her parents are anxiously contemplating her marriage. Narada visited the kingdom and strongly prevailed upon them to have a matrimonial alliance with Satyavanta. The marriage was celebrated with all religious formalities. Savitri knew through Narada that her husband would not live long. As the destined day was approaching, she was closely watching his movements and accompanying him.

Three days before the fateful moment, she commenced her fast and went into the forest with her Lord, where he would hew wood. When the sun reached the zenith, Satyavanta complained of a headache and fell down. Within minutes, Yama, the God of Death, seated on his Mahisha and relentlessly wrenched the life out of Satyavanta's body.

Seeing Yama deprive her lord's life, she questioned and argued with him about his authority to deal with a lady of spotless chastity and affection. Yama alternately appealed to her, threatened her, and even opened up the scenes of hell with its terrors and dire punishments. But nothing daunted her; she pursued him, crossed the Vaitarani, and compelled him to restore the life of her beloved Satyavanta. Greatly pleased with her wisdom, courage, and chastity, he also gave her many a boon, which conferred, among others, progeny to Aswapati and kingdom to Dyumatsena.

== Cast ==
- Savitri – Ramatilakam
- Satyavanta – Nidumukkala Subbarao
- Aswapati – Govindaraju Venkata Ramayya
- Dyumatsena – Dharmapuri Buchiraju
- Saradvata – Chirravuri Dikshitulu
- Narada – Parupalli Satyanarayana
- Yama – Vemuri Gaggayya
- Malavi – Parvati Bai
- Saibi – Padmavati Bai
- Vasantika – Lalitha

== Box office ==
The film was an Industry Hit at the box office and became the first Telugu film to collect over ₹2 lakh in distributor share with a box office gross of ₹3 lakh.
