= Bellary Raghava =

Indian playwright and actor

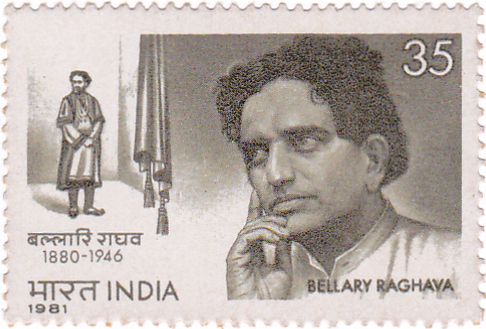
- Born: Tadipatri Raghavacharylu; 2 August 1880; Anantapuram,Bellary District, Ceded Madras presidency, British India (present - day) Anantapuram Andhra Pradesh India
- Died: 16 April 1946 (aged 65) Madras, Madras Presidency, British India, (Present - day Chennai Tamil Nadu)
- Occupations: Thespian actor dramatist playwright

Bellary Raghava (born Tadipatri Raghavacharyulu; 2 August 1880 – 16 April 1946) was an Indian playwright and actor, known for his works predominantly in Telugu theatre and cinema. His uncle Dharmavaram Ramakrishnamacharyulu was a pioneering dramatist in Telugu, and initiated him on the stage. Raghava was also associated with another dramatist from Ballari, Kolachalam Srinivasa Rao. His students include female artists like Sarojini Kopparapu, Padmavati Kommuri, Annapurna Kakinada, and male artists like Vasudevarao K.S., Apparao Basavaraju and Banda Kanakalingeswara Rao.

== Early life ==
Raghava studied at Bellary High School and at Christian College, Madras. He then practiced law after graduating from Madras Law College in 1905. Aged 12, he founded Shakespeare Club in Ballari and played in Shakespeare dramas. Raghava also portrayed main characters in various dramas in the Sreenivasarao Kolachalam's group "Sumanohara" in Bangalore. In 1909 he founded the Amateur Dramatic Association of Bangalore.

== Notable theatre works ==
Harischandra, Padukapattabhishekamu, Savitri, Brihannala, Ramaraju charitra, Ramadasu, Tappevaridi, Saripadani sangatulu, etc. were his noted dramas. He visited various countries like Sri Lanka, England, France, Germany and Switzerland and gave seminars and lectures on Indian drama art. He advocated and developed the naturalistic style in acting. He was very particular that women should always play female roles on the stage. In 1927 he went to England and took part in English dramas with Laurence Olivier and Charles Laughton. His presentation of Tappevaridi by Rajamannar in 1930 in Madras, has received critical reception as a momentous event heralding a new era in Telugu theatre.

== Cinema ==
In 1936, Raghava played Duryodhana in H. M. Reddy's Draupadi Maanasamrakshanam. He then acted in Raithu Bidda (1939) and Chandika (1940), and garnered critical acclaim.

== Death ==
Raghava died on 16 April 1946. The Ballari Raghava Puraskaram award was instituted in his memory. It is presented to talented artists who contributed to drama and cinema. In 1981, a postal stamp was released in his memory.
