= List of Telugu films of 1950 =

Complete list of films produced by the Tollywood film industry based in Madras in 1950.

Title	Production	Director	Music	Cast	Release
Aahuti	Naveena Films	R. S. Junnarkar	S. Rajeswara Rao	Aarani Satyanarayana, C. Krishnaveni, Rushyendramani, Suryakantham	22 June 1950
Adhrusta Deepudu	T. N. T. Productions	S. Soundararajan	Addepalli Rama Rao	Suryakumari, Rama Sarma, Mukkamala, Gummadi	27 October 1950
Beedala Patlu	Pakshiraja Studios	K. Ramnoth	S. M. Subbaiah Naidu; G. Aswathama	V. Nagayya, Javar Seetharaman, T. S. Balaiah, Lalitha, Padmini, Serukulathur Sama	9 December 1950
Jeevitham	AVM Productions	A. V. Meiyappan	R. Sudarsanam	Vyjayanthimala, T. R. Ramachandran, S. Varalakshmi, C. H. Narayana Rao, C. S. R. Anjaneyulu	14 July 1950
Lakshmamma	Sobhanachala & M. R. A. Productions	T. Gopichand	Ghantasala	C. H. Narayana Rao, C. Krishnaveni, Govindarajula Subba Rao, Mudigonda Lingamurthy, Kumari Rukmani	26 February 1950
Maaya Rambha	N. B. Productions	T. P. Sundaram	Ogirala Ramachandra Rao	Anjali Devi, K. Raghuramaiah, N. T. Rama Rao, G. Varalakshmi, C. S. R. Anjaneyulu	22 September 1950
Modhati Rathri	Prakash Productions	K. S. Prakash Rao	Pendyala Nageswara Rao	G. Varalakshmi, C. H. Narayana Rao, Kasturi Siva Rao, K. S. Prakash Rao, P. K. Saraswathi	9 June 1950
Palletoori Pilla	Sobhanachala & B. A. S. Productions	B. A. Subba Rao	P. Adinarayana Rao	A. Nageswara Rao, N. T. Rama Rao, Anjali Devi	27 April 1950
Paramanandayya Sishyulu	Allied productions	Kasturi Siva Rao	Ogirala Ramachandra Rao; Susarla Dakshinamurthi	A. Nageswara Rao, C. Lakshmi Rajyam, Girija, C. S. R. Anjaneyulu, Kasturi Siva Rao, Relangi	6 October 1950
Shavukaru	Vijaya Productions	L. V. Prasad	Ghantasala	N. T. Rama Rao, Sowcar Janaki, Govindarajula Subba Rao, Santha Kumari, S. V. Ranga Rao	7 April 1950
Samsaram	Sadhana Productions	L. V. Prasad	Susarla Dakshinamurthi	A. Nageswara Rao, C. Lakshmi Rajyam, N. T. Rama Rao, Pushpalata	29 December 1950
Sri Lakshmamma Katha	Prathibha Productions	Ghantasala Balaramayya	C. R. Subburaman	A. Nageswara Rao, Anjali Devi, G. Varalakshmi, Kasturi Siva Rao	26 February 1950
Sri Saibaba	Unity Pictures	Pattabhi	Mallikarjun (Mallik)	Mannava Ramachandra Rao, Adhanki Srirama Murthy, Hemalatha, C. S. R. Anjaneyulu, Parepalli Subba Rao, Surabi Balasaraswati, Bharathi Devi	21 December 1950
Swapna Sundari	Prathibha Productions	Ghantasala Balaramayya	C. R. Subburaman	A. Nageswara Rao, Anjali Devi, G. Varalakshmi, Kasturi Siva Rao, Surabhi Balasaraswathi	9 November 1950
Thirugubatu	Ragini Films	P. Pullaiah	Bhimavarapu Narasimha Rao	C. H. Narayana Rao, Santha Kumari, C. Krishnaveni, Adhanki Srirama Murthy, 'Baby' Mallika	19 March 1950
Vaali – Sugreeva	Asoka Movies	Jampana	S. Rajeswara Rao; Pendyala Nageswara Rao; Master Venu; Gali Penchala Narasimha Rao; Ghantasala	C. S. R. Anjaneyulu, Sriranjani Jr., G. Varalakshmi	19 January 1950
