= List of Telugu films of 1940 =

This is a list of Telugu films produced in the year 1940 by the Tollywood film industry based in Hyderabad, India.

Title	Director	Cast	Producer	Genre	Ref.
Barrister Parvateesarrn	R. Prakash	Lanka Satyam, G. Varalakshmi, K. Sivarao, L. V. Prasad	Motion Pictures Combines	Comedy	
Bhoja Kalidasu	H. V. Babu	Adhanki Srirama Murthy, Parepalli Subba Rao, P. Kannamba	Jaya Films	Mythology	
Bhookailas	Sundar Rao Nadkarni	M. V. Subbiah Naidu, R. Nagendra Rao, Lakshmi Bai, R. Subramanyam, Hymavathi	Saraswathi Cine Films	Devotional	
Bondam Pelli	H. M. Reddy	L. V. Prasad, G. Varalakshmi	Madras United Artistes Corporation	Comedy	
Chaduvukunna Bharya	H. M. Reddy	Lanka Satyam, G. Varalakshmi	Madras United Artistes Corporation	Comedy	
Chandika	R. S. Prakash	P. Kannamba, Bellary Raghava, Vemuri Gaggaiah, Aarani Satyanarayana	Bhavani Pictures	Adventure	
Illalu	Gudavalli Ramabrahmam	V. Umamaheswara Rao, Kanchanamala, Lakshmi Rajyam	Indira Devi Films	Family	
Jeevana Jyothi	China Kameswara Rao Dronamraju	Ch. Narayana Rao, C. Krishnaveni, Kamala Kotnis	M. R. A. Productions	Drama	
Kalachakram	Amancharla Gopala Rao	Banda Kanakalingeshwara Rao, Lakshmi Rajyam, M. Krishna Rao, N. Nagaraja Rao, Uma Devi	Naveena Bharath	Drama	
Mahiravana	Ch. Narayana Murthy	Vemuri Gaggaiah, Kanchanamala, R. Subramanyam, Yandamuri Raju, T. Ramakrishna Sastry	Kubera Pictures	Mythology	
Malathi Madhavam	C. Pullaiah	Pushpavalli, C. Srinivasa Rao, P. Bhanumathi, Relangi	Metropolitan Pictures	Folklore	
Meerabai	B. Narasimha Rao	Govindarajula Subba Rao, M. V. Lakshmi, Bogaraju Perraju	Navyakala Films	Devotional	
Sumangali	B. N. Reddy	A. S. Giri, V. Nagayya, Kumari, Malathi	Vauhini Studios	Social	
Viswa Mohini	Y. V. Rao	V. Nagayya, Bezawada Rajarathnam, Y. V. Rao, Lalitha Devi	Sri Jagadesh Films	Drama	
