= Guna Sundari =

- Poster
- Directed by: K. Kameswara Rao
- Written by: Thanjai N. Ramaiah Dass (dialogues)
- Story by: Pingali Nagendra Rao
- Produced by: B. N. Reddy; A. Chakrapani
- Starring: Gemini Ganesan; Savitri
- Cinematography: Marcus Bartley
- Edited by: C. P. Jambulingam; G. Kalyanasundaram
- Music by: Ghantasala
- Production company: Vijaya Productions
- Release date: 16 December 1955
- Running time: 15370 ft
- Country: India
- Language: Tamil

Guna Sundari or Gunasundari is a 1955 Indian Tamil-language film starring Gemini Ganesan and Savitri. The film was a remake of the 1949 Telugu film Gunasundari Katha. It was not successful at the box office.

== Plot ==
Ugra Senan is the king of Dhara Nagaram. He has three daughters, Rupasundari, Hemasundari, and Gunasundari.

Gunasundari is the youngest. Their mother dies when Gunasundari is born. Ugra Senan brings up the three girls with the utmost care. After the girls are grown up, one day during a chat between father and daughters, the two older daughters declare that the father is the most important person in a girl's life. However, Gunasundari differs from them and says that the husband is the most important person in a girl's life. Father Ugra Senan becomes displeased and angry at Gunasundari. He marries off the two older daughters to their cousins. But to teach Gunasundari a lesson, he marries her off to an aged pauper with a physical deformity.

After the wedding, the king learns that the pauper is actually a young prince but suffers from a curse. The king orders Gunasundari and her husband to leave his kingdom. They then live in a hut outside the kingdom.

The king becomes ill. The native physicians say his illness can be cured only with a rare gem called Mahendra Mani. Gunasundari's husband goes in search of the gem and succeeds in finding it. He is turned into a bear due to another curse. His two elder brothers-in-law rob the gem from him and give it to the king who is then cured.

Gunasundari prays to Lord Shiva and Parvati regularly. Shiva and Parvati are pleased with her devotion and bless her and her husband. Relieved of his curses, Gunasundari's husband regains his handsome princely form.

The king learns the truth. He recalls Gunasundari and her husband back to the kingdom and crowns them King and Queen.

== Cast ==
Male cast

- R. Ganesh as prince
- M. E. Madhavan as deformed prince
- S. V. Ranga Rao as Ugrasenan
- M. N. Nambiar as second son-in-law
- A. Karunanidhi as Eldest son-in-law
- Duraisami
- V. M. Ezhumalai
- R. Nageswara Rao
- C. V. V. Panthulu
- R. S. Ramaswamy
- E. R. Sahadevan
- Balakrishna

Female cast

- Savitri as Gunasundari
- Lakshmi Prabha as Rupasundari
- T. P. Muthulakshmi as Hemasundari
- A. Kamala Chandrababu
- T. N. Meenakshi
- Rushyendramani
- Seetha
- Rajani
- Dhanam
- Kumari Thulasi
- Baby Sharada
- Baby Jaya & Nirmala
- Baby Uma & Komala

== Production ==
B. N. Reddy and A. Chakrapani produced the film under the banner Vijaya Productions. The film was made in Telugu with the title Gunasundari Katha with Sriranjani and Kasturi Siva Rao. The Telugu film was released in 1949. The film is said to be inspired by Shakespeare's King Lear.

== Soundtrack ==
Music was composed by Ghantasala and lyrics for all songs were penned by Thanjai N. Ramaiah Dass. Playback singers are Ghantasala, A. M. Rajah, S. C. Krishnan, Seerkazhi Govindarajan, P. Leela, Jikki, K. Rani & Kamala.

No.	Song	Singers	Lyrics	Length (m:ss)
1	Ho Brahmadevane on YouTube	Ghantasala	Thanjai N. Ramaiah Dass	02:56
2	Ennaasai Kannaalane Arugil Vaadaa on YouTube	K. Rani	Thanjai N. Ramaiah Dass	01:28
3	Kalaiye Un Vizhikooda on YouTube	A. M. Rajah	Thanjai N. Ramaiah Dass	02:32
4	Adhuve Edhiril Varuvathurkkulle Adadaa Nadadaa on YouTube	S. C. Krishnan & Seerkazhi Govindarajan	Thanjai N. Ramaiah Dass	02:26
5	Jil Jil Jil Raani on YouTube	Jikki	Thanjai N. Ramaiah Dass	02:34
6	Naan Seidha on YouTube	A. M. Raja & P. Leela	Thanjai N. Ramaiah Dass	02:45
7	Ammaiye Appaa Arutchelvame on YouTube	Ghantasala & Kamala	Thanjai N. Ramaiah Dass	01:07
8	Thaaragai Solaiyile Veniilaave on YouTube	Jikki & K. Rani	Thanjai N. Ramaiah Dass	03:09
9	Karpanai Bavaaniye Karunaiyamudhe on YouTube	P. Leela	Thanjai N. Ramaiah Dass	03:05
10	Araaro Aariraro.... Poojaa Balam Petra on YouTube	Ghantasala	Thanjai N. Ramaiah Dass	01:03
11	Theindhu Kolluveer Theindhu Kolluveer on YouTube	S. C. Krishnan & K. Rani	Thanjai N. Ramaiah Dass	02:38
12	Ubagaara Gunaanidhiyaai Uruvaanavale Maadhaa on YouTube	P. Leela	Thanjai N. Ramaiah Dass	02:49
13	Indha Ulaga Naadaga Medaiyadaa on YouTube	Ghantasala, S. C. Krishnan & Seerkazhi Govindarajan	Thanjai N. Ramaiah Dass	03:25
14	O Maadhaa Vaaraai Kurai Kelaai on YouTube	P. Leela	Thanjai N. Ramaiah Dass	03:04
15	Aatthirame....Vidhiyaa idhu Sadhiyaa on YouTube	Ghantasala	Thanjai N. Ramaiah Dass	02:24
16	Thoodhu Sellum Kogilam on YouTube	Jikki & K. Rani	Thanjai N. Ramaiah Dass	02:55
17	Thiruvodu Enthidum Paradhesiyaam on YouTube	P. Leela	Thanjai N. Ramaiah Dass	02:03

== Box office ==
Gunasundari was a flop unlike the original.
