= Sri Krishna Tulabharam =

Sri Krishna Tulabharam may refer to:

- Sri Krishna Tulabharam (1966 film), an Indian Telugu-language Hindu mythological film
- Sri Krishna Tulabharam (1935 film), a Telugu-language Hindu mythological film
