= T. Kanakam =

Indian Telugu actress and singer

- Born: 1926/1927; Kharagpur
- Died: 21 July 2015 (aged 88); Vijayawada
- Occupations: Actor, singer
- Awards: NTR Art Award – 2004

T. Kanakam (c. 1927 – 21 July 2015) was an Indian Telugu drama and film actress and singer between the 1940s and 1960s. She acted in some of the best known and most popular hit films of that period.

== Biography ==
Kanakam was born in Kharagpur in 1927 and later relocated to Vijayawada. She started singing folk songs in All India Radio since childhood. She became famous for playing Nayakuralu Nagamma in Palnati Yudham and Sri Krishna in Kurukshetram dramas. She also played as Srirama, Chintamani and many more and toured the entire state playing the dramas. She is contemporary to Peesapati Narasimha Murty, Shanmukhi Anjaneya Raju, Kalyanam Raghuramaiah, Relangi, Madhavapeddi Satyam and others.

She sang some songs in the films including Cheyi Cheyi Kalupukora in Raksharekha and Bhale Doralaku in Shavukaru.

She received the Nandamuri Taraka Ramarao Theatre Art Award for 2004 from the Government of Andhra Pradesh. Kanakam died in 2015, aged 88.

== Filmography ==
Year	Film	Language	Character
1946	Gruhapravesam	Telugu	
1947	Brahma Ratham	Telugu	
1949	Gunasundari Katha	Telugu	Yakshini
1949	Keelu Gurram	Telugu	
1949	Raksha Rekha	Telugu	
1950	Shavukaru	Telugu	Raami
1951	Aakasa Raju	Telugu	
1951	Patala Bhairavi	Telugu	
1951	Agni Pareeksha	Telugu	
1951	Maya Pilla	Telugu	
1952	Daasi	Telugu	Durgi
1953	Velaikari Magal	Tamil	Durgi
1954	Peddamanushulu	Telugu	Item number
1966	Letha Manasulu	Telugu	
1967	Bhakta Prahlada	Telugu	
