= I. V. Subba Rao =

I. V. Subba Rao may refer to:

- I. V. Subba Rao (scientist)
- I. V. Subba Rao (civil servant)
