= Velaikari Magal =

1953 Tamil-language drama film

- Theatrical release poster
- Directed by: C. V. Ranganatha Das
- Screenplay by: Ilangovan
- Based on: Daasi by C. Lakshmi Rajyam
- Produced by: C. Lakshmi Rajyam
- Starring: N. T. Rama Rao; C. Lakshmi Rajyam; S. V. Ranga Rao
- Cinematography: M. A. Rehman; N. C. Balakrishnan
- Edited by: Manikyam
- Music by: Subburaman-Dakshinamurthi
- Production company: Rajyam Pictures
- Distributed by: Bell
- Release date: 14 January 1953
- Running time: 180 minutes
- Country: India
- Language: Tamil

Velaikari Magal (transl. Maid's daughter) is a 1953 Indian Tamil-language drama film directed by C. V. Ranganatha Das and starring N. T. Rama Rao, C. Lakshmi Rajyam, and S. V. Ranga Rao. The film is a remake of the 1952 Telugu film Daasi.

== Plot ==
The film depicts the hardships and emotional turmoil of a submissive maid and her daughter. The story highlights the exploitation of the poor by wealthy, arrogant households, tracking the daughter's journey as she navigates societal prejudices, seeks dignity, and works to overcome her family's low social standing.

== Cast ==
- N. T. Rama Rao as Ramaiah
- C. Lakshmi Rajyam as Lakshmi
- S. V. Ranga Rao as Badrinath
- Relangi
- Kasturi Siva Rao
- Doraiswamy Naidu
- Suryakantham
- Santha Kumari as Parvathamma
- T. Kanakam as Durgi
- Pushpavalli
- Surya Prabha

== Production ==
After the commercial success of the Telugu film Daasi (1952), C. Lakshmi Rajyam and her husband Sridhar Rao, decided to produce a Tamil version of the film under their banner Rajyam Pictures. The name of the film was inspired by C. N. Annadurai's Velaikari (1949). The film was directed by C.V. Ranganatha Doss and featured music by the duo C. R. Subbaraman – S.Dakshinamoorthy; the cast and crew were retained from the original.

== Soundtrack ==
The music was composed by the duo Subburaman-Dakshinamurthi.

Song title	Singers	Lyrics
"Pagalellaam Velai Seydhe"	M. L. Vasanthakumari & K. Devanarayanan	K. Devanarayanan
"Jaldi Jalo Joraai Raaja"	Pithapuram Nageswara Rao	K. Devanarayanan
"Pudhumai Innaale Pugazh Thirunaale"	P. Leela	K. D. Santhanam
"Anbe Endhan Aaruyire Azhaadhe"	M. L. Vasanthakumari	K. D. Santhanam
"Mudindhadhe En Vaazhvu Inre"	M. L. Vasanthakumari	K. D. Santhanam
"Kaatharula Venumadaa Kadavule"	K. Devanarayanan	K. Devanarayanan
"Aththai Veedu Sugamillai"	P. Leela, A. P. Komala & Pithapuram Nageswara Rao	K. D. Santhanam
"Madhu Niraiyum Pudhiya Narumanam"	A. P. Komala	K. D. Santhanam
"Thalukku Kulukku Nadai Minukkuthu"	A. P. Komala	K. D. Santhanam
"Ambalatharase Arumarunthe"	S. Dakshinamurthi	K. D. Santhanam

== Release ==
The film released on 14 January 1953 coinciding with Pongal. The film, unlike the Telugu original, did not fare well at the box office.
