= Illalu =

Illalu is a term in Telugu that means wife or housewife. It can also refer to:

- Illalu (1997 film)
- Illalu (1981 film)
- Illalu (1965 film)
- Illalu (1940 film)
- Illalu Priyuralu, a 1984 film.
