= Mugguru Maratilu =

- Theatrical release poster
- Directed by: Ghantasala Balaramayya
- Written by: Balijepalli Lakshmikantham (story / dialogues)
- Produced by: Ghantasala Balaramayya
- Starring: Akkineni Nageswara Rao; C. H. Narayana Rao; G. Narayana Rao; Bezawada Rajaratnam; Kannamba; T. G. Kamala Devi
- Cinematography: P. Sridhar
- Edited by: G. D. Joshi
- Music by: Ogirala Ramachandra Rao
- Production company: Pratibha Productions
- Distributed by: Poorna films
- Release date: 1 June 1946
- Running time: 128 minutes
- Country: India
- Language: Telugu

Mugguru Maratilu is a 1946 Telugu-language historical drama film produced and directed by Ghantasala Balaramayya under the Pratibha Productions banner. It stars Akkineni Nageswara Rao, C. H. Narayana Rao, Bezawada Rajaratnam and Kannamba, with music composed by Ogirala Ramachandra Rao. The film was recorded as a Super Hit at the box office and established Akkineni Nageswara Rao in the Telugu film industry.

== Cast ==
- Akkineni Nageswara Rao as Firoji
- C. H. Narayana Rao as Somoji
- G. Narayana Rao as Subandhi
- Bezawada Rajaratnam
- Govindarajula Subba Rao as Maharaja Siddhoji
- Kasturi Siva Rao as Timoji
- Kannamba as Maharani Rukmibai
- T. G. Kamala Devi as Raghubai
- Kumari as Anthumbai

== Crew ==
- Art: S. V. S. Rama Rao
- Choreography: Vedantam Raghavayya
- Story - Dialogues: Balijepalli Lakshmikantham
- Lyrics: Tapi Dharma Rao, Prayaga Narasimha Sastry
- Playback: Akkineni, Kannamba, T. G. Kamala Devi, Kasturi Shiva Rao, Bezawada Rajaratnam, Prayaga Narasimha Sastry
- Music: Ogirala Ramachandra Rao
- Editing: P. Sridhar
- Cinematography: G. D. Joshi
- Producer - Director: Ghantasala Balaramayya
- Banner: Pratibha Productions
- Release Date: 1 June 1946

== Soundtrack ==
Mugguru Maratilu

Film score by Ogirala Ramachandra Rao
- Released: 1946
- Genre: Soundtrack
- Length: 31:02
- Producer: Ogirala Ramachandra Rao

Music composed by Ogirala Ramachandra Rao. Lyrics were written by Tapi Dharma Rao. Music released on Audio Company.

No.	Title	Singers	Length
1.	"Teerukada Naa Aasa"	Kannamba	2:31
2.	"Apanaa Tanamana"	Kasturi Siva Rao	1:34
3.	"Chal Chalo Vayyari"	T. G. Kamala Devi, Akkineni	1:34
4.	"Deva Premamaya"	Kasturi Siva Rao	1:55
5.	"Eeroje"	T. G. Kamala Devi	2:03
6.	"Jeevanamu Yamuna Jeevanam"	T. G. Kamala Devi	2:54
7.	"Marulu Neepaigontira"	T. G. Kamala Devi	3:08
8.	"Raalipotivaa Malathi"	T. G. Kamala Devi	1:58
9.	"Raatamu Vadakumaa"	T. G. Kamala Devi	2:47
10.	"Yellammaa Talleeki"	Prayaga Narasimha Sastry, Chorus	2:33
11.	"Jai Jai Bhairava"	Kannamba, Akkineni, Kamala Devi	1:54
12.	"Kanuna Maani Thana" (Burrakatha)	Prayaga Narasimha Sastry	6:11

== Box office ==
- The film ran for 100 days in four centers; Vijayawada, Guntur, Rajahmundry and Nellore in Andhra Pradesh.
