= Veera Abhimanyu =

Veera Abhimanyu could refer to one of the following films:

- Veera Abhimanyu (1936 film), in Telugu
- Veera Abhimanyu (1965 film), in Tamil
- Veerabhimanyu, 1965 Telugu film
