= I. Panduranga Rao =

Indian writer and poet (1930–2011)

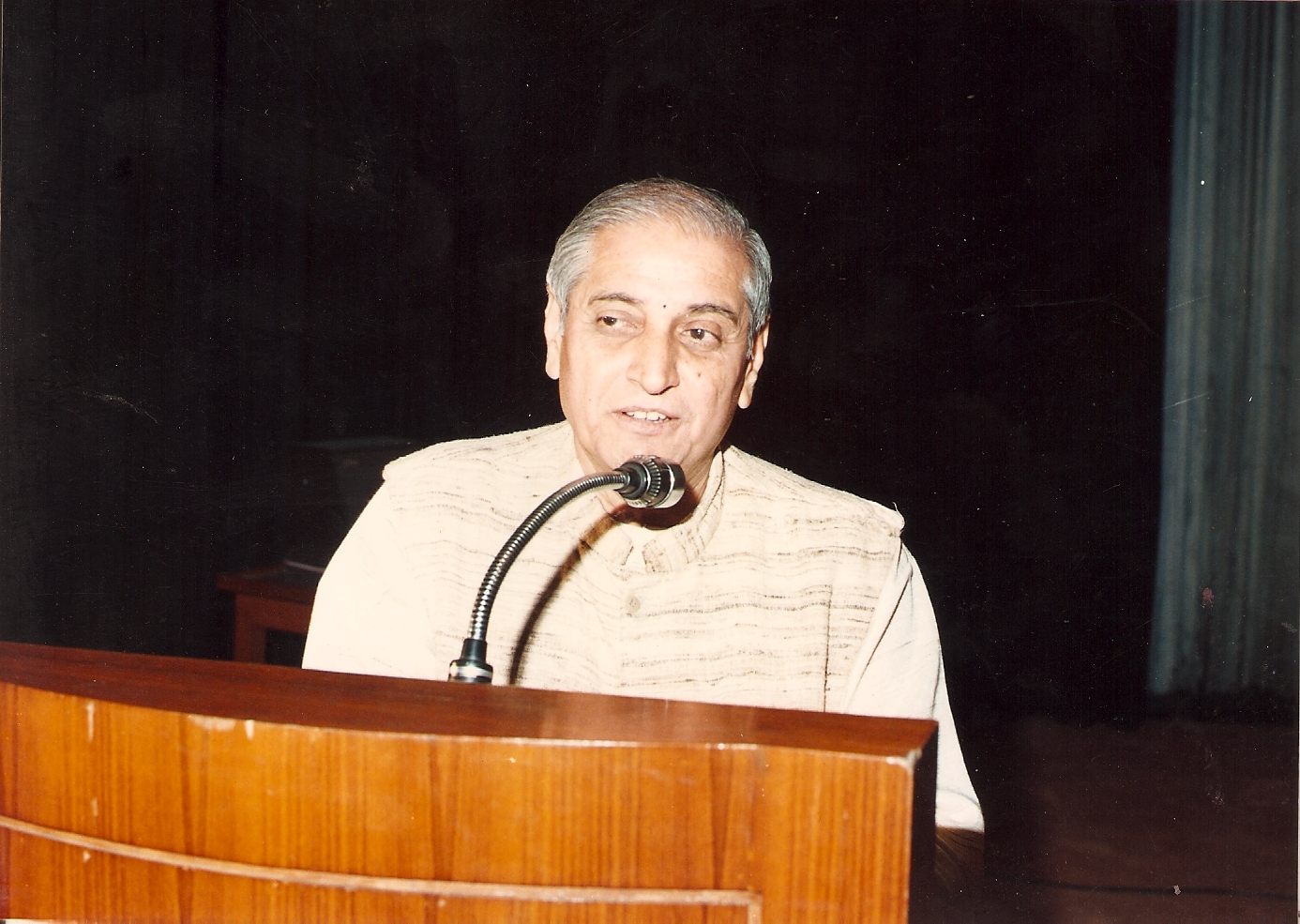
Panduranga Rao

Ilapavuluri Panduranga Rao (15 March 1930 – 25 December 2011) was an Indian scholar, poet, writer, linguist and orator of Telugu descent.

Rao played a significant role in the establishment of Indian civil service exams in multiple languages. He also created many creative studies and translations of classical works into Hindi, Telugu and English.

== Early life ==
Rao was born in Ilapavuluru village in Andhra Pradesh. His elder brother, Kameswara Rao, was a musician and musicologist who lectured extensively on Carnatic music.

After graduating from university, he taught mathematics and Hindi in Ongole, Guntur, Nellore and Rajahmundry. Inspired by Mahatma Gandhi’s call to bridge the many ‘divides’ in the Indian society, Rao decided to study Hindi language at Nagpur University. In 1956, he became the first Telugu to gain a PhD in Hindi. His doctoral thesis on a comparative study of Telugu and Hindi drama was among the first comparative studies in the country.

== Personal life ==
Panduranga Rao's flair for poetry and penchant for popularizing ancient Hindu thought found its fullest expression in the 1970s and continued through the later years in Delhi. His residence was a meeting ground of contemporary prominent poets and literary personages. He was ably supported in the organization of these literary events by his wife, Radha, whom he married in 1951. They have six children, of whom a daughter, Kalyani, died in 1977. The eldest son, I. V. Subba Rao joined the Indian Administrative Service in 1979 and later, in 2011, the United Nations; the second son, Raghunath, has been a senior executive with a number of Indian companies including Maruti and Tata Steel and currently works and lives in Chicago; the three daughters, Vangmayi, Anupa and Suvarna, are active home makers and proactive volunteers for social causes. Suvarna, an artist, is exploring new ways of using art in enriching daily life.

Rao died in New Delhi at the age of 81, after a few years of ill health, on 25 December 2011.

== Career ==
In 1957, Rao started working for the State Government of Andhra Pradesh as Hindi Education Officer. In 1960 he became a regional officer with the Government of India as a regional officer for the Eastern Region of India. This was part of the Central Government Hindi Teaching Scheme to popularize the use Hindi.

In 1964, Rao became involved in a study by the Indian Government on creating civil service exams in more languages. At that time, individuals taking the exam for India's highest level of civil service could only take it in English or Hindi, putting the speakers of other Indian languages at a disadvantage. Since these other languages were listed as official in the Indian Constitution, fairness dictated that the exam be available in them.

Rao joined the language team under the Union Public Service Commission (UPSC) to study the issue. As the Senior Research Officer (Hindi) and later, as Director (Languages), from 1964 to 1986, he helped the Government shape and implement the new language policy in the civil service examinations.

Rao took voluntary retirement from the Government of India in 1986 and joined Bharatiya Bhasha Parishad, Kolkata, a non-governmental cultural organization, as the Director. In 1989, he moved back to Delhi to head another national literary institution, Bharatiya Jnanpith. During his seven years as the Director of this organization and ex-officio member of the selection committee, he coordinated the process of selecting literary works for their annual awards.

== Writing ==
Rao has contributed to the field of comparative studies and has referred to his translations as ‘trans-creations’.His translation of classics of Hindi poetry like Jay Shankar Prasad's ‘Kamayani’, ‘Aansu’ and Sumitranandan Pant's ‘Chidambara’, Malayalam litterateur, Thakazhi Siva Sankara Pillai's ‘Enippadikal’ enriched literary exchanges and appreciation of literature across Indian languages. He translated Telugu poetry into English and edited an anthology of contemporary Telugu poetry for the Indian Council for Cultural Relations.

In addition to the translations of literary works into Telugu, Hindi and English, he wrote extensively on Indian literary epics, most notably on Ramayana. He authored nearly 40 works covering a variety of literary genres. He was a poet at heart and had composed poems from the age of 17. His prose too had a rare lyrical rhythm and a captivating alliterative style which endeared his works to a large readership.

== Speaking ==
He was closely associated with many religious leaders who recognized his ability to convey complex religious ideas in simple language. The head of Kanchi Kamakoti Peetham, one of the oldest Hindu monasteries established by Adi Sankara around 482 B.C., honoured him with the title of ‘Kavi Ratna’ (‘Gem among poets’). Panduranga Rao lectured for a number of years at the Ramakrishna Mission as well as Ramana Kendra. He accompanied and translated the speeches of Sri Satya Sai Baba of Puttaparthi from Telugu to Hindi when Baba was touring northern Indian states.

== Awards ==
He was honoured by the Government of Andhra Pradesh, the Madras Telugu Academy, Anuvad Parishad and the Hindi Academy. He was conferred the title of ‘Kavi Ratna’ by Jagadguru Shankaracharya of Kanchipuram.

== List of works ==
1. Andhra Hindi Roopak (1961, Nagari Prakashan, Patna)
2. Chaturvimshati (1971, Navjeevan Book Links, Vijayawada)
3. Chidambara (1972, Andhra Pradesh Book Distributors, Hyderabad)
4. Sri Kamakshivilas (1974, Shankar Academy of Sanskrit Culture and Classical Arts, New Delhi)
5. Kanneeru (1974, Andhra Pradesh Book Distributors, Hyderabad)
6. Kaamaayani (1974, Andhra Pradesh Book Distributors, Secunderabad)
7. Sant Tyagaraj (1975, Andhra Pradesh Sangeet Natak Akademi, Hyderabad)
8. Baba ke saath das baarah din (1975, Sri Satya Sai Seva Samiti, New Delhi)
9. Suradasa Kavita Vaibhavam (1976, Yuva Bharati, Secunderabad)
10. Women in Valmiki (1978, Andhra Mahila Sabha, Hyderabad)
11. Aditya Hridayam (1978, Tirumala Tirupati Devasthanams, Tirupati)
12. Aadi Anaadi (1978, Tirumala Tirupati Devasthanams, Tirupati)
13. Geetamritam (1978, Tirumala Tirupati Devasthanams, Tirupati)
14. Vishnu Sahsranamam (1978, Tirumala Tirupati Devasthanams, Tirupati)
15. Lalitha Sahasranamam (1978, Tirumala Tirupati Devasthanams, Tirupati)
16. Meera Madhuri (1980, Sri Goda Grandhamala, Musnuru)
17. Ramayana Paramartham (1980, Yuva Bharathi, Hyderabad)
18. Sahasradhara (1980, Vishwa Adhyatma Samaj, Delhi)
19. Art of translation (1980, Indian Institute of Mass Communication, New Delhi)
20. Indian Poetry Today (1981, Indian Council for Cultural Relations, New Delhi)
21. Madhura Kavi Potana (1982, International Telugu Institute, Hyderabad)
22. Upanishadsudha (1982, Yuva Bharati, Hyderabad)
23. Baba Fareed Suktulu (1982, Yuva Bharati, Hyderabad)
24. Satya Shati (1982, Sri Satya Sai Seva Samiti, New Delhi)
25. Tulasi Manjari (1983, Sri Goda Grandhamala, Musnuru)
26. Iham Param (1984, International Telugu Institute, Hyderabad)
27. Sri Sahasrika (1985, Akshara Bharati, New Delhi)
28. Gurajada (1990, Sahitya Akademi, New Delhi)
29. Ramayan ke Mahila patra (1990, Bharatiya Jnanpith, New Delhi)
30. Thoughts on Ramayana (1990, Akshara Bharati, Kolkata)
31. Voice of Vision (1990, Akshara Bharati, Kolkata)
32. Ram Katha Navneet (1991, Bharatiya Jnanpith, New Delhi)
33. Mettuku Pai Mettu (1995, National Book Trust, New Delhi)
34. Mana Prasiddha Punyakshetralu (1996, National Book Trust, New Delhi)
35. Swantantra Udyama Geyalu (1997, National Book Trust, New Delhi)
36. Yagnavalkya Maharshi (1999, Tirumala Tirupati Devasthanams, Tirupati)
37. The Universe that is God (1999, Jnana Pravah, Varanasi)
38. Valmiki (2000, Sahitya Akademi, New Delhi)
39. Aatmananda Lahari (2003, EMESCO, Hyderabad)
40. Anudina Ramayanam, (2003, Telugu Akademi, Hyderabad)
