= Two Wives =

Two Wives may refer to:

- Iddaru Pellalu (English title: Two Wives), 1954 Telugu drama film
- Two Wives (1967 film) (Japanese: 妻二人), film directed by Yasuzo Masumura
- Two Wives (2009 TV series), South Korean television series
- Two Wives (2014 TV series), Philippine remake of the South Korean television series

== See also ==
- My Two Wives, 1992 Australian television series
- Polygyny, when a man has two (or more) wives simultaneously
