= Balaraju =

- Theatrical release poster
- Directed by: Ghantasala Balaramayya
- Written by: Story: Prayaaga; Screenplay: Samudrala Sr
- Produced by: Ghantasala Balaramayya
- Starring: Akkineni Nageswara Rao; S. Varalakshmi; Anjali Devi
- Cinematography: P. Sridhar
- Edited by: L. M. Lal
- Music by: Ghantasala Venkateswara Rao; Galipenchala Narasimha Rao; C. R. Subbaraman (background score)
- Production company: Pratibha Productions
- Distributed by: Poorna films
- Release date: 26 February 1948
- Running time: 163 minutes
- Country: India
- Language: Telugu

Balaraju is a 1948 Indian Telugu-language swashbuckler fantasy film produced and directed by Ghantasala Balaramayya under the Pratibha Productions banner. It stars Akkineni Nageswara Rao, S. Varalakshmi, and Anjali Devi with music jointly composed by Ghantasala, Galipenchala Narasimha Rao and C. R. Subbaraman. The film was recorded as an Industry Hit at the box office and was the first Telugu Silver Jubilee film.

== Cast ==
- Akkineni Nageswara Rao as Balaraju
- S. Varalakshmi as Seeta
- Anjali Devi as Mohini
- Kasturi Siva Rao as Yalamanda
- Seetaram as Rayudu
- D. S. Sadasiva Rao as Indra
- G. Ramayya as Kammanaidu
- G. Subba Rao as Shetty
- A. L. Narayana as Gandharva
- N. Krishnayya as Agni
- G. Narayana Rao as Kubera
- C. Venkateswara Rao as Yaksha
- A. Aadi Seshaiah as Lord Shiva
- K. Ram Murthy as Varuna
- T. K. V. Naidu as Rushi
- Lingam Subba Rao as Thief
- K. K. Ayangar as Chalamayya
- K. V. Subba Rao as Peda Naidu
- Surabhi Balasaraswathi
- Naarimani as Lakshmi
- C. Rajaratnam as Lakshmamma
- B. Seetabayamma as Punnamma
- Anasuya
- Krishnaveni

== Crew ==
- Art: S. V. S. Rama Rao
- Choreography: Vedantam Raghavayya
- Screenplay - Lyrics - Dialogues: Samudrala Sr.
- Playback: Ghantasala, S. Varalakshmi, V. Sarala Rao, Kasturi Siva Ram
- Music: Galipenchala Narasimha Rao, Ghantasala Venkateswara Rao
- Background Score: C. R. Subburaman
- Story: Prayaaga (also Folklore Songs)
- Editing: T. M. Lal
- Cinematography: P. Sridhar
- Producer - Director: Ghantasala Balaramayya
- Banner: Pratibha Films
- Release Date: 26 February 1948

== Soundtrack ==
Balaraju

Film score by Galipenchala Narasimha Rao Ghantasala Venkateswara Rao
- Released: 1948
- Genre: Fantasy
- Length: 50:47
- Producers: Galipenchala Narasimha Rao; Ghantasala

Music composed by Galipenchala Narasimha Rao, Ghantasala Venkateswara Rao. Lyrics were written by Samudrala Sr.

S. No.	Song title	Singers	length
1	"O Balaraja Preme Yerugava"	S. Varalakshmi	1:55
2	"Evarine Nenevirine"	S. Varalakshmi	2:46
3	"O Balaraja Jali Leda"	S. Varalakshmi	2:45
4	"Alak Paadi Araka Chesi"	Chorus	1:51
5	"Cheliya Kanarava"	Ghantasala	2:25
6	"Rupama Neeyaraya"	S. Varalakshmi	5:47
7	"Okarini Nanavesav"	Kasturi Siva Rao, V. Sarala Rao	1:46
8	"Teeyani Vennela Reyi"	V. Sarala Rao	2:53
9	"Gutilo Chilakedire"	Chorus	1:31
10	"Chalura Vagalu"	S. Varalakshmi, Akkineni Nageswara Rao	1:17
11	"Teli Chudumu Hai"	Ghantasala, S. Varalakshmi	2:51
12	"Chuda Chakkani Chinnadi"	Seetaram	1:02
13	"Devudayya Devudu"	Kasturi Siva Rao	2:19
14	"Raja Ra Na Raja"	S. Varalakshmi	3:39
15	"Navodayam Subhodayam"	Ghantasala	3:25
16	"Neeku Nevaru Leru"	S. Varalakshmi	3:54
17	"Vere Leraya Paramesha"	S. Varalakshmi	2:16
18	"Varala Kuna"	Kasturi Siva Rao	2:56
19	"Varuna Varuna"	S. Varalakshmi	3:29

== Box office ==
- The film ran for more than 100 days in 11 centres in Andhra Pradesh.
- The Silver Jubilee celebrations were held at Jaihind Talkies, Vijayawada on 4 June 1948.
- This film had a 365-day run in Vijayawada.
