= Seetha Kalyanam =

Seetha Kalyanam or Sita Kalyanam may refer to:

- Sita Kalyanam, the marriage of Sita and Rama in the Ramayana
- Sita Kalyanam (1934 Tamil film), an Indian film directed by Baburao Phendarkar
- Sita Kalyanam (1934 Telugu film), a Hindu mythological film directed by Chitrapu Narasimha Rao
- Sita Kalyanam (1976 film), a Telugu film directed by Bapu
- Seetha Kalyanam (2009 film), a Malayalam film directed by T. K. Rajeev Kumar
- Seetha Kalyanam (TV series), a 2018 Malayalam television series directed by Sunil Karyattukara

== See also ==
- Seetharama Kalyanam (disambiguation)
