= Kamalakara Kameswara Rao =

Indian film director (1911–1998)

- Born: 4 October 1911; Machilipatnam, Madras Presidency, British India
- Died: 29 June 1998 (aged 86); Nellore, Andhra Pradesh, India
- Education: Bachelor of Arts
- Alma mater: Noble College, Machilipatnam
- Occupation: Film direction
- Writing career
- Period: 1940s to 1980s
- Genres: Epic; Historical
- Notable works: Mahakavi Kalidasu; Gundamma Katha; Mahamantri Timmarusu; Nartanasala

Kamalakara Kameswara Rao (4 October 1911 – 29 June 1998) was an Indian film director known for his works predominantly in Telugu cinema, and a few Tamil and Hindi films. Widely known as Pauranika Chitra Brahma (transl. Brahma of mythological films), Kameswara Rao directed fifty feature films in a variety of genres.

In 1960 he directed the biographical film, Mahakavi Kalidasu which won the President's silver medal for Best Feature Film in Telugu. In 1962 he directed Gundamma Katha which was commercially successful and received the Filmfare Award for Best Film – Telugu. In the same year, he directed another biographical film, Mahamantri Timmarusu which won the President's silver medal for Best Feature Film in Telugu at the 10th National Film Awards.

In 1963, Kameswara Rao directed the epic mythological film Nartanasala. The film is cited among CNN-IBN's list of the hundred greatest Indian films of all time. The film has received wide critical acclaim and has garnered the National Film Award for Second Best Feature Film at the 11th National Film Awards, and has secured the Filmfare Award for Best Telugu Film.

== Life sketch ==
He was born in 1911 in Machilipatnam. He has completed a Bachelor of Arts from the Noble College, Machilipatnam. He has worked as a Film journalist for Krishna Patrika between 1934 and 1937. His unbiased reviews about the released films are highly appreciated by the audiences.

On invitation from H. M. Reddy, he has reached Madras. He has joined as assistant director and worked with K. V. Reddy and Moola Narayana Swamy for the film Gruhalakshmi in 1938. He has worked as assistant director for the films Vande Mataram, Sumangali, Devatha and Swarga Seema under Bomireddi Narasimha Reddy and for Bhakta Potana and Yogi Vemana under K. V. Reddy.

After observing him closely, Vijaya Productions has given the responsibility of independently direct Chandraharam in 1954 which was not commercially successful. He has left Vijaya Productions in 1955. He has directed about 30 films for National Art Theatres, Rajyam Pictures, Ponnaloori Brothers, Padmalaya Pictures, Mahija pictures and Suresh Productions over the period of three decades. He used to describe the film Nartanasala (1963) as his best directoral work, which won many National and International awards.

== Death ==
Rao died at the age of 88 years on 29 June 1998 due to cardiac arrest.

== Filmography ==
=== Director ===
- Chandraharam (Telugu & Tamil) (1954)
- Guna Sundari (Tamil) (1955)
- Penki Pellam (1956)
- Panduranga Mahatyam (1957)
- Sobha (1958)
- Raja Sevai (1959)
- Rechukka Pagatichukka (1959)
- Mahakavi Kalidasu (Telugu & Tamil) (1960)
- Mahamantri Timmarusu (1962)
- Gundamma Katha (1962)
- Narthanasala (1963)
- Pandava Vanavasamu (1965)
- Shakuntala (1966)
- Sri Krishna Tulabharam (Telugu & Tamil) (1966)
- Kambojaraju Katha (1967)
- Sri Krishnavataram (Telugu & Tamil) (1967)
- Kalasina Manushulu (1968)
- Veeranjaneya (1968)
- Mayani Mamata (1970)
- Sri Krishna Vijayamu (1970)
- Bala Bharatam (1972)
- Jeevitaashayam (1974)
- Kurukshetram (1977)
- Seetha Rama Vanavasam (1977)
- Gnana Kuzhandhai (1979)
- Sri Vinayaka Vijayamu (1980)
- Sri Vasavi Kanyaka Parameswari Mahatyam (1980)
- Deiva Thirumanangal (1981) (Valli Thirumanam part only)
- Ekalavya (1982)
- Santoshi Mata Vrata Mahatmyamu (1983)
- Badarinatha Darshanam (1985)
- Sri Datta Darsanam (1985)
- Ashtalakshmi Vaibhavamu (1986)
- Devi Navagraha Nayaki (1986)
- Edu Kondalaswami (1991)

=== Assistant director ===
- Gruhalakshmi (1938)
- Vande Mataram (1939)
- Sumangali (1940)
- Devatha (1941)
- Bhakta Potana (1942)
- Swargaseema (1945)
- Yogi Vemana (1947)
- Gunasundari Katha (1949)
- Patala Bhairavi (1951)
- Guna Sundari (1955)

== Awards ==
National Film Awards

- National Film Award for Second Best Feature Film in 1964 - Nartanasala.
- 1962: President's silver medal for Best Feature Film in Telugu - Mahamantri Timmarusu
- 1960: President's silver medal for Best Feature Film in Telugu - Mahakavi Kalidasu

== See also ==
- I. Panduranga Rao
