= Daasi (1952 film) =

1952 Telugu film

- Theatrical release poster
- Directed by: C. V. Ranganatha Das; L. V. Prasad (supervision)
- Written by: Vempati Sadasivabrahmam (story / dialogues)
- Produced by: C. Lakshmi Rajyam
- Starring: N. T. Rama Rao; C. Lakshmi Rajyam; S. V. Ranga Rao
- Cinematography: M. A. Rehman; N. C. Balakrishnan
- Edited by: Manikyam
- Music by: C. R. Subburaman; Susarla Dakshinamurthi
- Production company: Rajyam Pictures
- Release date: 26 November 1952
- Country: India
- Language: Telugu

Daasi (transl. Slave) is a 1952 Indian Telugu-language drama film, produced by C. Lakshmi Rajyam under the Rajyam Pictures banner and directed by C. V. Ranganatha Das, under L. V. Prasad's supervision. It stars N. T. Rama Rao, C. Lakshmi Rajyam and S. V. Ranga Rao, with music composed by C. R. Subburaman & Susarla Dakshina Murthy. The film was later remade in Tamil as Velaikari Magal by the same banner and director.

== Plot ==
Ramaiah is a horse-cart driver, his wife Lakshmi works as a maid at Zamindar Badrinath, and the couple has a son, Subbadu. Since Badrinath is perturbed as childless, he decides to remarry. At this, his ruffled wife, Parvatamma, enacts a fake pregnancy under the guidance of her elder Ramarao. At the same time, Lakshmi is again conceived when Ramarao schemes to pose her baby as Parvatamma's. Here, Ramaiah suspects the infidelity of Lakshmi as Ramarao becomes frequent to their house and expels her from holding Subbadu. She shelters at Ramarao's residence, delivers a baby girl, and quits. Ramaiah remarries Durga, who elopes with a stage actor after throwing Subbadu into a stream. Dejected, Lakshmi attempts suicide when she finds her son fortuitously and saves him. After Durga quits, Ramaiah turns into an ascetic. Years roll by, and Lakshmi's daughter Kamala grows up as vainglory under the pampering of Parvatamma and loves Ramarao's son, Premnath. But Premnath's mother, who is aware of actuality, opposes it. Subbadu / Subbarao is molded into a lawyer of repute by his mother. After a few twists from here on, all ends up well. Ramaiah returns home, and the family is reunited.

== Cast ==
- N. T. Rama Rao as Ramaiah
- C. Lakshmi Rajyam as Lakshmi
- S. V. Ranga Rao as Rama Rao
- Relangi as Narayana
- Kasturi Siva Rao
- Srivatsa Venkateswara Rao as Badrinath
- Doraswamy as Premnath
- Santha Kumari as Parvathamma
- Suryakantham as Dr. Sarala
- T. Kanakam as Durgi
- T. D. Vasantha as Kamala
- Pushpavalli

== Soundtrack ==
Daasi

Film score by C. R. Subburaman Susarla Dakshinamurthi
- Released: 1952
- Genre: Soundtrack
- Producers: C. R. Subburaman; Susarla Dakshinamurthi

Music composed by C. R. Subburaman & Susarla Dakshinamurthi. Lyrics were written by Acharya Aatreya.

S. No.	Song title	Singers	length
1	"Maarajula Chaakirichesi Dorasaani"	K. Prasad Rao & P. Leela	
2	"Jorse Chal Naa Raja"	Pithapuram Nageswara Rao	
3	"Kalakallade Panduga"	Jikki	
4	"Chitti Thalli Navvave"	P. Leela	
5	"Yedavakamma Yedavaku"		
6	"Teeripoyendi"		
7	"Salanga Nukkani"		
8	"Kotta Kapuram"		
9	"Sunna Sunna"		
10	"Vayasu Sogasu Yuvarani"		
11	"Naa Chinnari Baava"		
