= Sri Krishna Tulabharam (1935 film) =

1935 film by C. Pullayya

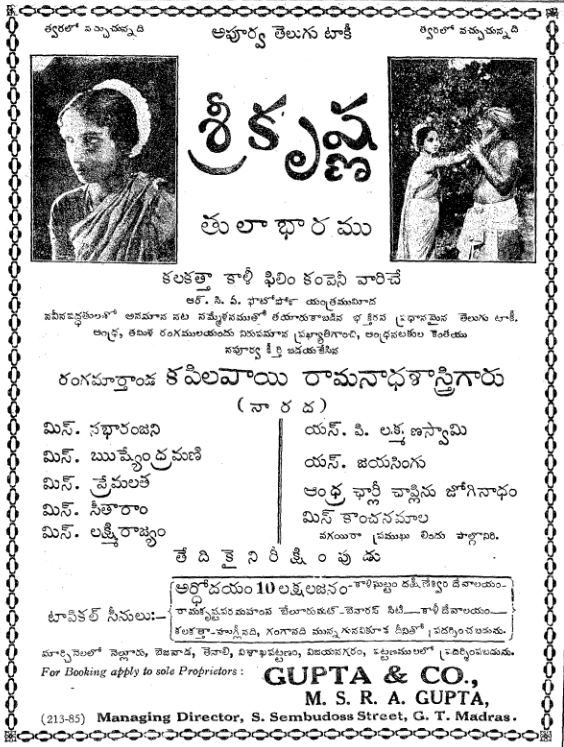
- Published in Andhra Patrika newspaper
- Directed by: Mukherjee; Rajaram
- Starring: Kapilavayi Ramanadha Sastry; Jayasingh; Rushyendramani; Kanchanamala; Lakshmirajyam; Relangi
- Production company: Calcutta Kali Film Company
- Release date: 22 April 1935
- Country: India
- Language: Telugu

Sri Krishna Tulabharam (transl. 'Sri Krishna's Tulabhara') is a 1935 Telugu-language Hindu mythological film directed by Mukherjee and Rajaram and produced by Calcutta Kali Film Company. The screenplay, adapted by Mutharaju Subba Rao, is based on the Tulabharam episode from the Mahabharata involving Hindu deity Krishna and his third consort Satyabhama. The film stars Kapilavayi Ramanadha Sastry, Jayasingh, Rushyendramani, Kanchanamala, Lakshmirajyam, and Relangi. It marks the on-screen debuts of Rushyendramani, Kanchanamala, Lakshmirajyam, and Relangi, and was filmed in Calcutta.

== Plot ==
The story revolves around the Tulabharam episode from the Mahabharata, where Satyabhama's pride is humbled when she is unable to match the weight of Krishna on a scale, despite offering all her wealth. Ultimately, a single leaf of Tulasi offered by Rukmini tips the scale, symbolizing the supremacy of devotion over material wealth.

== Cast ==
- Jayasingh as Sri Krishna
- Kapilavayi Ramanadha Sastry as Narada
- Rushyendramani as Satyabhama
- Guntur Sabharanjani as Rukmini
- Kanchanamala as Mitravinda
- Lakshmirajyam as Nalini
- Kakinada Joginadham as Vasanthaka
- Relangi as Vidushaka

== Production ==
The film was produced by Calcutta Kali Film Company, which was known for its focus on mythological and devotional subjects. The screenplay was written by Mutharaju Subba Rao, and the film was directed by Mukherjee and Rajaram, marking one of the earliest successful mythological films in Telugu cinema.

The film was shot in Calcutta and featured a cast of emerging actors, including Relangi and Rushyendramani, in their debut roles. Rushyendramani, already a famous stage actress, received a then-hefty sum of ₹1,000 for her performance, as did Kapilavayi. For Relangi, his payment was ₹75.

To attract audiences, the filmmakers included scenes of holy places like the bathing ghats of Kasi, Kali Ghat and the Dakshineswar Temple in Calcutta, which were shown before the main feature. This added a devotional appeal to the film, drawing large crowds.

== Music ==
The film's songs and verses were written by Chandala Kesavadasu, Muttaraju Subba Rao, and Sthanam Narasimha Rao. The film incorporated popular songs and verses from the stage play. Sri Krishna Tulabharam featured three songs that became popular, particularly Bhale Manchi Chowka Beramu, which gained wide recognition. These songs were reused in two subsequent versions of the film produced in 1955 and 1966.

== Reception ==
Sri Krishna Tulabharam was well-received, with audiences appreciating its devotional themes and performances. Rushyendramani, already a celebrated stage actress, made her silver screen debut in this film and was particularly praised for her portrayal of Satyabhama. The film's success established her as a leading actress in Telugu cinema.

== Legacy ==
The 1935 version of Sri Krishna Tulabharam became one of the pioneering mythological films in Telugu cinema. It set a precedent for future adaptations of mythological stories, inspiring later versions of the film in 1955 and 1966, both of which retained several elements from the original, including the famous songs and verses.

The film also marked the screen debut of other notable actors like Kanchanamala, Lakshmirajyam, and Relangi, all of whom would go on to have successful careers in the industry.
