= Paramanandayya Sishyulu =

- Theatrical release poster
- Directed by: Kasturi Siva Rao
- Written by: Tapi Dharma Rao (dialogues)
- Story by: Tapi Dharma Rao
- Produced by: Kasturi Siva Rao
- Starring: Akkineni Nageswara Rao; Lakshmi Rajyam; C.S.R
- Cinematography: B. Subba Rao
- Edited by: P. V. Manikyam; K. A. Sriraamulu
- Music by: Ogirala Ramachandra Rao; Susarla Dakshinamurthi
- Production company: Allied Productions
- Release date: 6 October 1950
- Running time: 164 mins
- Country: India
- Language: Telugu

Paramanandayya Sishyulu (transl. Paramanandayya's disciples) is a 1950 Indian Telugu-language swashbuckling comedy film, produced and directed by Kasturi Siva Rao under the Allied Productions banner. It stars Akkineni Nageswara Rao, Lakshmi Rajyam, and C.S.R. with music composed by Ogirala Ramachandra Rao and Susarla Dakshinamurthi. The film was a commercial failure.

The film was remade in Telugu in 1966 as Paramanandayya Sishyula Katha starring N. T. Rama Rao, K. R. Vijaya in pivotal roles, which went on to be remade in Kannada in 1981 as Guru Shishyaru.

== Cast ==
- Akkineni Nageswara Rao as Chandrasena
- Lakshmi Rajyam as Leela
- C.S.R. as Paramanandayya
- Relangi as Sishyudu
- Kasturi Siva Rao as Avataram
- Gadepalli Ramaiah as Prachandasenudu
- Nalla Ramanurthy as Sishyudu
- Narayana Rao as Udayasena / Musuku Manishi
- Enum as Sishyudu
- Raojulapalli as Sishyudu
- Girija as Hema
- Hemalatha as Shanta
- Surabhi Balasaraswathi
- Seeta
- Ramalakshmi
- Savitri
- Saroja

== Crew ==
- Art: S. V. S. Rama Rao
- Choreography: Pasumarthi, C. Ram Murthy
- Stills: M. Satyam, K. Satyam
- Fights: Stunt Somu & Party
- Dialogues — Lyrics: Tapi Dharma Rao
- Playback: Susarla Dakshinamurthi, P. Leela, A.V. Saraswati, K.Rani, Relangi, Kasturi Siva Rao, CSR
- Music: Ogirala Ramachandra Rao, Susarla Dakshinamurthi
- Story: Tapi Dharma Rao
- Editing: P. V. Manikyam, K. A. Sriraamulu
- Cinematography: B. Subba Rao
- Producer — Director: Kasturi Siva Rao
- Banner: Allied Productions
- Release Date: 6 October 1950

== Music ==
Paramanandayya Sishyulu

Film score by Ogirala Ramachandra Rao Susarla Dakshinamurthi
- Released: 1950
- Genre: Soundtrack
- Producers: Ogirala Ramachandra Rao; Susarla Dakshinamurthi

The music was composed by Ogirala Ramachandra Rao and Susarla Dakshinamurthi, and lyrics were written by Tapi Dharma Rao. Music was released on Audio Company.

S. No.	Song title	Singers	length
1	"Abbanta"	Group song	2:35
2	"Chuchitava Janaka"	K.Rani	2:33
3	"Edira Lakshmana"	Susarla Dakshinamurthi, Relangi, K.Rani	2:29
4	"Ee Matalabu Vinarayya"	Kasturi Siva Rao	3:17
5	"E Leela Cheliyanu"	Susarla Dakshinamurthi	3:45
6	"Ide Dharmamoyi"	C.S.R.	1:41
7	"Mana Sukhamu Kali"		3:02
8	"Polika Raada"	Susarla Dakshinamurthi, K. Rani	3:01
9	"O Raaja"	K.Rani	
10	"Kaala Mahimanu Nenu"		
11	"Edigo Edigo"		
12	"Chilara Rallaku"	Kasturi Sivarao & A.V. Saraswathi	
13	"Sanvatsaramulu"		
