= Seetha Rama Vanavasam =

- Poster
- Directed by: Kamalakara Kameshwara Rao
- Written by: Valmiki
- Cinematography: K. S. Prasad
- Release date: 1977
- Country: India
- Language: Hindi

Seetha Rama Vanavasam is a 1977 Tollywood drama film directed by Kamalakara Kameshwara Rao.

== Cast ==
- Ravi... Ram
- Jayapradha... Sita
- Kaikala Satyanarayana... Ravan
- Gummadi... Dasharath
- B. Saroja Devi... Mandodari
- Anjali Devi... Kaushalya
- Vijaya Lalitha... Kaikeyi
- Jamuna... Shabari

== Music ==
Hindi version

1. "Aao Aao Raavan Maharaj" – Vani Jairam
2. "Awadhpuri Singhasan Saje" – Mahendra Kapoor
3. "Darshan To Dene Ko Aa Re Raam Tu" – Vani Jairam
4. "Gao Me Yash Gaan Tera" – Vani Jairam
5. "Giri Giri Saj Dhaj Mai Aayi Hu" – Vani Jairam
6. "Jai Ho Jai Jai Seeta Raam" – S. P. Balasubrahmanyam, B. Vasantha
7. "Mat Ja Re Raama" – Mahendra Kapoor
8. "Shri Raam Ka Naam Ki Lo Sharan" – Vani Jairam
9. "Siya To Chahe Aage Chalna" – Vani Jairam
