= Mayalokam =

- Theatrical release poster
- Directed by: Gudavalli Ramabrahmam
- Written by: Daita Gopalam (dialogues)
- Story by: Tripuraneni Gopichand
- Produced by: Gudavalli Ramabrahmam
- Starring: Akkineni Nageswara Rao; S. Varalakshmi
- Edited by: Maanikyam; D. Yoganand
- Music by: Galipenchala Narasimha Rao
- Production company: Sarathi Films
- Distributed by: Narasu Studios
- Release date: 10 October 1945
- Country: India
- Language: Telugu

Mayalokam (transl. Magic World) is a 1945 Indian Telugu-language film produced and directed by Gudavalli Ramabrahmam under the Sarathi Films banner. It stars Akkineni Nageswara Rao and S. Varalakshmi, with music composed by Galipenchala Narasimha Rao. The film marks the debut of veteran actor and producer Padmanabham. It was successful at the box office.

== Cast ==
- Akkineni Nageswara Rao as Sarabandi Raju
- S. Varalakshmi as Rangasani
- Govindarajula Subba Rao as Kambhoja Raju
- C. S. R. as Navabhoja Raju
- Vedantam Raghavayya as Shiva
- Padmanabham as the prince
- M. C. Raghavan as Rajugaru
- Dr. GV Seetapati as Brahmana Mantri
- Kannamba as Manikyamba
- M. V. Rajamma as Yojanagandhi
- C. Santha Kumari as Rathnagandhi
- T. G. Kamala Devi as Lalitha
- Radio Bhanumathi as Kambhoja Raju's eldest wife

=== Princes ===
- Lanka Satyam
- J.Rama Rao
- Mahabir Singh Tagore
- B. Varahala Raju
- G.Narayana Rao

== Soundtrack ==
Mayalokam

Film score by Galipenchala Narasimha Rao
- Released: 1944
- Genre: Soundtrack
- Producer: Galipenchala Narasimha Rao

Music composed by Galipenchala Narasimha Rao. Music released on Audio Company.

S.No	Song title	Lyrics	Singers	length
1	Sri Janakidevi			
2	Aa Vidhi Sayudayo			
3	Akata Naa Jeevanadhi			
4	Tarinanani Tarinanani			
5	Ashayalinga Vibho			
6	Bhale Bhale Navabhojaraja			
7	Araray! Dattigatti!			
8	Rama Chalinka			
9	Yevaro Ee			
10	Laratkai Sudimudita Yamini			
11	Manade Prapanchamanta			
12	Athivichitramu Nee Mahima			
13	Kotaloni Kambhojaraja			
14	Vaaluchupu			
15	Cheliya Manakelane			

== Box office ==
- The film ran for more than 100 days in 4 centers in Andhra Pradesh.
