= S. V. S. Rama Rao =

Indian art director (1913–1970)

Seelamsetty Venkata Sri Rama Rao (1913–1970) was an art director, motion picture director and producer of Telugu films. He was one of the pioneers in that film industry, working from the era of silent movies to the talkies of the late 1970s. He was the art director for the movie on the Lord Venkateswara by the title Sri Venkateswara Mahatyam, designing its artwork. He belonged to the Kapu-Telaga community of Andhra Pradesh.

He was described as a man "who had a lasting impact on south Indian cultural history."

== Career ==
After art studies, Rama Rao worked as an art director in both Telugu and Tamil productions, for a total of around 450 movies for various banners like Vauhini Studios, Raagini and Vijaya Productions. He was closely associated with the producer/director Ghantasala Balaramayya and Master Venu, a music director.

He also produced movies under his own banner called "Jaimini Productions", viz. Santha Balanagamma, Chinnamma Katha starring Siva Rao, Vengal Reddy and Krishna Kumari.

He won awards for his artwork, painting on the folk ladies named Lambadi kanya from the British Government in the year 1934. His well-known art directed movies in Telugu and Tamil are Sri Venkateswara Mahatyam (In which his painting of "Lord Venkateswara" is still in Salarjung Museum, Hyderabad. It was said that he was the only person who was allowed to portrait the Lord at Tirumala Tirupathi Devasthanam).

== Filmography ==
- Mallapilla (1938)
- Santha Bala Nagamma (1942)
- Mugguru Marateelu (1946)
- Balaraju (1948)
- Dharmadevata (1952)
- Chinnamma Katha (1952)
- Sarangadhara (1957)
- Vinayaka Chavithi (1957)
- Deepavali (1960)
- Sri Venkateswara Mahatyam (1960)
- Vanagamuddi (Tamil)
