= Prema (1952 film) =

- Theatrical release poster in Telugu
- Directed by: P. S. Ramakrishna Rao
- Written by: Kondamudi Goparaya Sarma (dialogues)
- Screenplay by: P. S. Ramakrishna Rao
- Story by: Bhanumathi Ramakrishna
- Produced by: P. S. Ramakrishna Rao; Bhanumathi Ramakrishna (Presents)
- Starring: Bhanumathi Ramakrishna; Akkineni Nageswara Rao
- Cinematography: Kamal Ghosh
- Edited by: V. S. Narayanan
- Music by: C. R. Subburaman
- Production company: Bharani Studios
- Release date: 14 June 1952
- Running time: 171 minutes (Telugu); 169 minutes (Tamil)
- Country: India
- Languages: Telugu; Tamil

Prema (transl. Love) is a 1952 Indian romance film, produced and directed by P. S. Ramakrishna Rao under the Bharani Studios banner. The film is simultaneously made in Telugu and Tamil languages, the latter titled Kaadhal. It stars Bhanumathi Ramakrishna and Akkineni Nageswara Rao with music composed by C. R. Subburaman. Bhanumathi wrote the story, for the first time.

== Cast ==
- Bhanumathi as Mothi
- Nageswara Rao as Raja
- C.S.R as Sivaswamy
- Relangi as Raoji
- Mukkamala as Parasuram
- Kasturi Siva Rao as Raoji's Assistant
- Doraiswamy as Sundara Rao
- Suryakantham as Chimlli
- Sriranjani as Latha
- Surabhi Kamalabai as Bansi

Tamil

- K.V. Subba Rao as Kate Rao
- A. L. Narayana as Watchman
- K. S. Angamuthu as Jagathambal

== Soundtrack ==
Theatrical release poster of the Tamil version Kaadhal

Music was composed by C. R. Subburaman. Lyrics were by Kondamudi Goparaya Sarma.

Telugu

| Song title | Singers | length |
|---|---|---|
| "Aagavoyi Maraja" | Bhanumathi Ramakrishna | 2:59 |
| "Oh Hayiga" | Bhanumathi Ramakrishna | 3:14 |
| "Pelliyanta Pelliyanta" | Bhanumathi Ramakrishna | 2:54 |
| "Priyuni Baase" | Bhanumathi Ramakrishna | 2:54 |
| "Rojuku Roju" | Ghantasala, Bhanumathi Ramakrishna | 3:15 |
| "Divya Premaku Saatiyaune" | Ghantasala, Bhanumathi Ramakrishna | 3:58 |
| "Ee Lokamantha" | Bhanumathi Ramakrishna | 2:13 |
| "Neeti Leni Lokamaa" | Bhanumathi Ramakrishna | 3:38 |
| "Hayi Jeevithame" | Bhanumathi Ramakrishna | 2:19 |
| "Na Prema Nava" | Ghantasala | 2:36 |
| "Munthaperugoi Babu" | Kasturi Siva Rao, A. P. Komala | 2:47 |
| "Talatala Taluku" | Chorus | 0:56 |
| "Mahilala Rajyam" | Ghantasala, Kasturi Siva Rao, A. P. Komala | 2:46 |
| "Prapanchammantha Jhuta" | C.S.R | 1:37 |
| "Ooho! Idigada!" | R. Balasaraswathi Devi | 2:03 |

Tamil

Lyrics were by K. D. Santhanam.

| Song | Singers | Length |
|---|---|---|
| | P. Bhanumathi | 02:59 |
| "Aahaa Inbame Aahaa Engume Aahaa Pongudhe" | P. Bhanumathi | 03:14 |
| "Kalyaaname Namma Kalyaaname" | P. Bhanumathi | 02:40 |
| "Kanavu Thaano Ninaivu Yaavum Kaanal Neeraamo" | P. Bhanumathi | 02:52 |
| "Jeevidhamellaam Sweettaaga Seiyyum" | Ghantasala & P. Bhanumathi | 03:15 |
| "Inba Kaaviyam Aagum Vaazhve" | Ghantasala & P. Bhanumathi | 03:38 |
| "Maya Ulagile Oya Vichaaram" | P. Bhanumathi | 02:11 |
| "Vaazhvellam Paazhaanadhe" | P. Bhanumathi | 03:29 |
| "Aahaa Naan Adaindhen Inbame" | P. Bhanumathi | 02:19 |
| "Naan Konda Kaadhal Ivvaaruthaan" | Ghantasala | 02:36 |
| "Anandame Aahaa Aanandame" | A. P. Komala | 02:47 |
| "Masi Maasam Thirunaalaam" | A. P. Komala & chorus | 02:48 |
| "Madhichiyathile Kudiyirukkiradhu" | Pithapuram Nageswara Rao & A. P. Komala | 02:57 |
| | CSR | 01:37 |
| | R. Balasaraswathi Devi | 02:03 |

== Bibliography ==
- Rajadhyaksha, Ashish; Willemen, Paul (1998) [1994]. Encyclopaedia of Indian Cinema. British Film Institute and Oxford University Press. ISBN 0-19-563579-5.
