= Rechukka Pagatichukka =

- Theatrical release poster of Telugu version
- Directed by: Kamalakara Kameswara Rao
- Written by: Samudrala Jr. (dialogues)
- Screenplay by: N. Trivikrama Rao
- Story by: N. Trivikrama Rao
- Produced by: N. Trivikrama Rao
- Starring: N. T. Rama Rao; Sowcar Janaki; S. V. Ranga Rao
- Cinematography: M. A. Rehman
- Edited by: G. D. Joshi
- Music by: T. V. Raju
- Production company: Swastisri Pictures
- Release dates: 14 May 1959 (Telugu); 2 October 1959 (Tamil)
- Running time: 164 minutes
- Country: India
- Languages: Telugu; Tamil

Rechukka Pagatichukka (transl. The Night Star and the Day Star) is a 1959 Indian Telugu-language swashbuckler film, produced by N. Trivikrama Rao and directed by Kamalakara Kameswara Rao. It stars N. T. Rama Rao, Sowcar Janaki and S. V. Ranga Rao, with music composed by T. V. Raju. The film was simultaneously made in Tamil as Raja Sevai (transl. Royal Service).

== Plot ==
=== Tamil version ===
Vijayavarman is the chief security officer of King Mahibalan. Mahibalan's younger brother Vikraman captures the kingdom. Vikraman goes for hunting one day. There he meets a girl, Gowri, who is the daughter of the chief of the mountain tribe, Bommanna. He promises that he will marry her and has sex with Gowri. Vikraman returns to the palace and calls for a meeting of local chiefs as he is afraid that the mountain tribes may come and take revenge. In the meantime, Gowri becomes pregnant. Bommanna brings her to the king's court while the meeting with local chiefs was in progress. He demands that Vikraman takes Gowri as his wife. But Vikraman feigns ignorance. Gowri commits suicide in the court itself. Bommanna swears that he will take revenge. Vikraman orders his soldiers to arrest Bommanna, but Vijayavarman objects. Bommanna escapes. Vikraman imprisons Vijayavarman. Bommanna rescues him from the prison and both plan to overthrow Vikraman. The rest of the story deals with many twists and turns.

== Cast ==
Tamil version titled Raja Sevai.

- N. T. Rama Rao as Vijay Kumar
- Sowcar Janaki as Rajakumari
- S. V. Ranga Rao as Vijaya Rayalu
- V. Nagayya as Dharma Devudu
- Rajanala as Uttara Kumarudu
- Mahankali Venkaiah as Puli Dora
- Kannamba as Sumathi Devi
- Girija
- Mohana
- S. Varalakshmi as Gowri (guest appearance)

=== Telugu version ===
- R. Nageswara Rao as Vikram Simhudu
- Relangi as Ayyomayam
- C.S.R. as Maharaju Veera Raghava
- Padmanabham as Takku
- Peketi Sivaram as Bhayankara Simhudu
- Balakrishna as Tikku
- Chaya Devi as Pootakulamma Avva
- Mohana

=== Tamil version ===
List adapted from the database of Film News Anandan and from the film's song book.

==== Male cast ====
- T. S. Balaiah
- P. S. Veerappa
- T. R. Ramachandran
- O. A. K. Thevar
- Master Balaji

==== Female cast ====
- Kusalakumari
- Jayalakshmi

== Production ==
The film was produced by N. Thrivikrama Rao, who also wrote the story, under the banner Swasthi Sri Pictures and was directed by Kamalakara Kameswara Rao. The dialogues were penned by Thanjai N. Ramaiah Dass. Cinematography was handled by M. A. Rahman while the editing was done by G. D. Joshi. A. Krishnan was in charge of audiography while the recordings were done by K. Harinath. Vembatti Satyam handled the choreography and the still photography was done by R. N. Nagaraja Rao.

The film was simultaneously produced in Telugu and Tamil and in Kannada with the title Rajashekara.

== Soundtrack ==
Music composed by T. V. Raju. Lyrics were written by Samudrala Jr.

Telugu Soundtrack

Song title	Singers	length
"Vardhillara"	P. Leela	3:37
"Neeve Ninoy"	S. Janaki	4:17
"Bhala Bhale Devuda"	Madhavapeddi Satyam, Pithapuram	3:05
"Aadu Pilla"	Pithapuram, S. Janaki	4:18
"Maa Aasa Neevega"	P. Leela	4:27
"Annalaara Thammulaara"	Ghantasala	4:40
"Pantham Patti"	Pithapuram	3:30
"Kaadhaa Avunaa"	Ghantasala, P. Susheela	2:55
"Manave Seyani"	Ghantasala	3:28
"Kuchchu Topi"	Ghantasala, A. P. Komala	4:24
"Prema Premani"	P. Susheela	2:28

the lyrics were penned by Thanjai N. Ramaiah Dass.

Tamil Soundtrack

Song	Singer/s	Duration (m:ss)
"Konjum Kanne Kumaaraa"	P. Leela	
"Paruva Kaalam Thavari Ponaal"	S. Janaki	
"Baleh Pervali Kannappaa"	Thiruchi Loganathan & A. L. Raghavan	01:41
"Kaadai Kauthaarigale"	A. L. Raghavan & S. Janaki	03:05
"Kannaana Kanmaniye"	P. Leela & group	04:11
"Mudiyaadhu Solla Mudiyaadhu"	Ghantasala & P. Susheela	02:42
"Thoodhu Sellaayo"	Ghantasala & P. Susheela	03:27
"Konangi Kullaa Poattu"	A. L. Raghavan & A. P. Komala	04:16
"Kaadhal Kadhaigal Pesi"	P. Susheela	
"Onghaara Kaali Maahaali"	S. C. Krishnan & group	02:25
