= Seetharama Kalyanam =

Seetharama Kalyanam may refer to these Indian films:

- Seeta Rama Kalyanam (1960 film)
- Seetharama Kalyanam (1986 film)

== See also ==
- Seetha Kalyanam (disambiguation)
- Sita Kalyanam, the marriage of Sita and Rama in the Ramayana
