= Paramanandayya Sishyula Katha =

- Theatrical release poster
- Directed by: C. Pullayya
- Screenplay by: C. Pullayya
- Story by: Vempati Sadasivabrahmam
- Produced by: Thota Subba Rao
- Starring: N. T. Rama Rao; K. R. Vijaya
- Cinematography: C. Nageshwara Rao
- Edited by: B. Gopala Rao
- Music by: Ghantasala
- Production company: Sridevi Productions
- Release date: 7 April 1966
- Running time: 181 mins
- Country: India
- Language: Telugu

Paramanandayya Sishyula Katha (transl. The story of Paramanandayya's students) is a 1966 Indian Telugu-language swashbuckler film directed by C. Pullayya. It stars N. T. Rama Rao, K. R. Vijaya with music composed by Ghantasala. It is produced by Thota Subba Rao under the Sridevi Productions banner.

The film was earlier made in Telugu in 1950 as Paramanandayya Sishyulu. The film was remade in Kannada in 1981 as Guru Shishyaru.

== Plot ==
The film begins at the Kailasa, where Siva tells Parvati that he will yield only to his most genuine souls, not to their pretenses, showing his advent devotee Nandivardhana on Earth. Nandivardhana is the ruler of Vijayadurgam, who spends his life frolicking and immersed in dancer Ranjani's love. Ergo, to sculpt him, Siva picks Chitralekha an angel. Once, Siva bestows her a "Rudrakshamala" to wear on visits. Upon back, Chitralekha tours the earth with a companion to bathe in a pool when seven saints bar her, whom she curses to be idiots. In return, their mentor, Aruna Keerti, says she would lose her celestial status if she met a human. Apologetic Chitralekha pronounces freedom for saints after her nuptial. On the guidance of Aruna Keerti, the saints proceeded to Vijayadurgam and joined as disciples of Spiritual Adviser Paramanandayya.

Meanwhile, Sivanandam, the evil Chief Minister of Nandivardhana, plots to assassinate him in the forest via his acolyte, Jagga Rayudu. Here, Nandivardhana fights back when he detects the "Rudrakshamala" overlooked by Chitralekha and wears it. Tracking down the blunder, Chitralekha returns to Earth. Nandivardhana inadvertently touches her, and she loses her divinity. He falls for her at first sight, but Chitralekha is perturbed about recouping her angelhood when Paramanandayya advises her to do penance.

Parallelly, the seven disciples' naughty steps pay the way for favors to Paramanandayya, such as protecting from a snake & thieves, arousing the hidden treasure in the door, etc. Apart from this, Chitralekha's acquaintance reforms Nandivardhana when Ranjani begrudges and poses him as vile. So, Chitralekha silently moves to the forest, where Jagga Rayudu captures her, but Nandivardhana secures her. Thus, she, too, endears him. Following, the Sivanandam intrigues by mingling Ranjani against Nandivardhana with him. She moves the pawn to rescue her King since her adoration is genuine.

Simultaneously, piqued Paramanandayya states the disciples to die, which they want to do. Assuming they have consumed poison and roam in the streets, imagining it is heaven, land at Royal Fort. Next, they move to Ranjani's house, feeling her as Apsara and letting Nandivardhana know the nefarious shade of the Sivanandam. At this, Ranjani sacrifices her life while guarding the King, and Sivanandam absconds. Later, the disciples do another service to their mentor by spoiling his daughter's match with a TB patient when Paramanandayya ousts them. They arrive at the Raj Mahal, break the slaying on Nandivardhana by Sivanandam, and convince Chitralekha to knit the King. At last, the saints are relieved from the curse after the espousal of Nandivardhana & Chitralekha. Finally, the movie ends on a happy note.

== Cast ==
- N. T. Rama Rao as Nandivardhana Maharaju
- K. R. Vijaya as Chitralekha
- L. Vijayalakshmi as Ranjani
- V. Nagayya as Paramanandayya
- Sobhan Babu as Lord Siva
- Satyanarayana as Jaggarayudu
- Padmanabham as Nandi (Sishya)
- Allu Ramalingaiah as Bhringi (Sishya)
- Raja Babu as Phani (Sishya)
- Mukkamala as Minister
- Chaya Devi as Anandam
- Dr. Sivaramakrishnayya as Virupakshayya
- Vangara as Parabrahma Sastry
- Sarathi as (Sishya)
- Modukuri Satyam as (Sishya)
- Ramachandra Rao as (Sishya)

== Soundtrack ==
Paramanandayya Sishyula Katha

Film score by Ghantasala
- Released: 1966
- Genre: Soundtrack
- Length: 26:23
- Producer: Ghantasala

Ghantasala chronology
C. I. D. (1965)	Paramanandayya Sishyula Katha (1966)	Shakuntala (1966)

Music composed by Ghantasala.

S. No.	Song title	Lyrics	Singers	length
1	"Om Nama Shivaya"	Vempati Sadasivabrahmam	Pattabhi, Raghuram, Bhadram, Gopal Rao, Babu, Sarojini, Vijayalakshmi	2:00
2	"Idhigo Vacchithi Rathi Raajaa"	Sri Sri	S. Janaki	3:20
3	"Enaleni Aanandam"	Vempati Sadasivabrahmam	Ghantasala, S. Janaki	2:56
4	"O Mahadevaa"2 versions	Vempati Sadasivabrahmam	P. Susheela	2:02
5	"Naaloni Raaga"	C. Narayana Reddy	Ghantasala, P. Susheela	3:27
6	"Vanitha Thananthata"	Vempati Sadasivabrahmam	P. Leela, A.P.Komala	4:41
7	"Parama Gurudu"	Kosaraju	Pithapuram Nageswara Rao, Raghavulu, Chakravarthy, Bhadram, Krishna Murthy	3:46
8	"Kaaminee Madana Raa Raa"	Samudrala Sr	Ghantasala, P. Leela	4:11
