= T. G. Kamala Devi =

Indian actress and voice actress (1930-2012)

- Born: Thota Govindamma; 29 December 1930; Karvetinagaram, Chittoor district, Madras Presidency, British India
- Died: 16 August 2012 (aged 81); Madras, Tamil Nadu, India
- Other names: Kamala Devi, Kamala Chandra Babu, A. Kamala Chandra Babu
- Children: 1

T. G. Kamala Devi (born Thota Govindamma; 29 December 1930 – 16 August 2012), also known as Kamala Chandra Babu, was an Indian dubbing artist, playback singer and actor who primarily contributed to Telugu cinema as well as a few Tamil films. She was also a former professional level billiards player who won the Indian Women Billiards title twice. She died of a brief illness at Chennai on 16 August 2012.

== Biography ==
She was born in Karvetinagaram, Chittoor district, Andhra Pradesh. Her original birth name was Thota Govindamma and she later changed her name to T. G. Kamala Devi after entering the film industry. The initials "T. G." in her name represent her birth name. She married Avula Chandra Babu in 1946 and had a son named Avula Jaychander with him.

== Film career ==
=== Acting ===
She was in a drama company and acted in some male and female roles in her early days. She received many medals for her performances. She then shifted to the cinema field and acted in about 30 films, most of them being minor supporting roles.

== Singer ==
She has sung several songs In Telugu and Tamil films like the Telugu-Tamil Film Pathala Bhairavi wher in Telugu she sang 'Ithihasam Vinaara' or the tamil version Ithikasam Kaetarra

=== Dubbing artist ===
She also was a popular dubbing artist and has lent her voice to actors such as Padmini, B. Saroja Devi, Lalitha and many more.

== Cue sports ==
Kamala was one of the earliest women cue sport players in India. When the then reigning snooker world champion Horace Lindrum visited Chennai at the invitation of the Andhra Maha Sabha in 1954, circumstances led Kamala to pick up the cue and provide Mrs. Lindrum a woman opponent to play against. Soon enough, she made her way to state and national-level tournaments. Since then, she played in various open tournaments in Billiards & Snooker as the only woman player at that time, competing with men at Chennai, Vijayawada and Bangalore. She won the Indian National Billiards Women titles in 1991 and 1995. She had the unique opportunity of playing exhibition matches at Bangalore and Mysore with the then World Billiards Champion Bob Marshall. She won both her billiards national titles at the age of 62 and 66 representing the Tamil Nadu state.

== Awards ==
- Nataka Kala Prapoorna was awarded to her by the Andhra Pradesh Nataka Academy.

== Titles ==
- National Billiards Champion: 1991, 1995

== Filmography ==
| Year | Film | Language | Character |
|---|---|---|---|
| 1941 | Dakshayagnam | Telugu | |
| 1941 | Choodamani | Telugu | |
| 1942 | Bala Nagamma | Telugu | |
| 1943 | Garuda Garvabhangam | Telugu | |
| 1944 | Sri Seeta Rama Jananam | Telugu | |
| 1945 | Mayalokam | Telugu | |
| 1946 | Mugguru Maratilu | Telugu | |
| 1946 | Vidyapathi | Tamil | Kamala |
| 1947 | Kanjan | Tamil | Amaravathi |
| 1949 | Gunasundari Katha | Telugu | |
| 1951 | Chandravanka | Telugu | |
| 1951 | Malliswari | Telugu | Jalaja |
| 1951 | Patala Bhairavi | Telugu | Veera Katha Performer |
| 1951 | Patala Bhairavi | Tamil | Veera Katha Performer |
| 1952 | Palletooru | Telugu | |
| 1954 | Thodu Dongalu | Telugu | |
| 1954 | Chakrapani | Telugu | |
| 1956 | Tenali Ramakrishna | Telugu | |
| 1959 | Illarikam | Telugu | |
| 1961 | Velugu Needalu | Telugu | |
| 1961 | Thooya Ullam | Tamil | |
| 1964 | Bhakta Ramadasu | Telugu | |
| 1965 | Bangaru Panjaram | Telugu | |
| 1967 | Kanchu Kota | Telugu | |
| 1968 | Asadhyudu | Telugu | |
| 1968 | Bangaru Sankellu | Telugu | |
| 1969 | Bangaru Panjaram | Telugu | |
| 1969 | Kathanayakudu | Telugu | |
| 1969 | Bhale Abbayilu | Telugu | Seetha, wife of Judge Madhava Rao |
| 1969 | Gandikota Rahasyam | Telugu | |
| 1970 | Pettandarlu | Telugu | |
| 1970 | Pelli Kuthuru | Telugu | |
| 1975 | Abhimanavathi | Telugu | |
| 1976 | Neram Nadi Kadu Akalidhi | Telugu | Rukimini, Punyakoti's wife |
| 1984 | Kutumba Gowravam | Telugu | |
| 1986 | Ide Naa Samadhanam | Telugu | Bhuvanagiri Bhavani Prasad's mother |
