= Ogirala Ramachandra Rao =

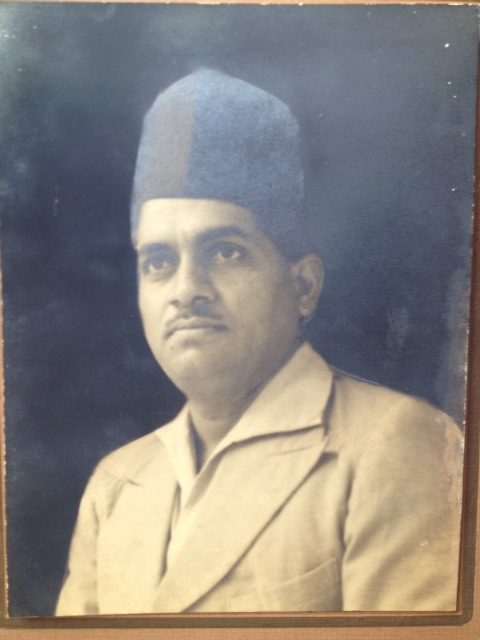

Background information
- Born: 10 September 1905
- Origin: Vijayawada, Andhra Pradesh, India
- Died: 17 June 1957 (aged 51)
- Genre: Indian film scores
- Occupation: Composer
- Instrument: Harmonium
- Years active: 1939–1956

Ogirala Ramachandra Rao (Telugu: ఓగిరాల రామచంద్రరావు) (1905–1957) was an Indian actor, music director and multi instrumentalist, working predominantly in Telugu cinema.

== Early life and career ==
Ogirala was born on 10 September 1905 at Vijayawada, Andhra Pradesh to Ogirala Janardhana Sharma and Subbamma. He started his career as an actor in Sri Venkateswara Mahatyam (1939), where he played the role of Lord Shiva. His debut film as music director was Malli Pelli in the same year produced by Y. V. Rao. He was also playback singer for Y.V. Rao and sang with Kanchanamala in the film.

He was also the music director for his next film Vishwamohini (1940). He has played key role for the success of Bejawada Rajaratnam as playback singer. He has assisted V. Nagayya for Swargaseema (1945) and Yogi Vemana (1947) for Vijaya Pictures.

== Filmography ==
Year	Movie name	Credits
1939	Malli Pelli	Playback singer and Music director
1940	Vishwamohini	Music director
1941	Parvati Kalyanam	Music director
1945	Swargaseema	Music director
1946	Mugguru Maratilu	Music director
1947	Yogi Vemana	Music director
1949	Gunasundari Katha	Music director
1949	Raksharekha	Music director
1950	Paramanandayya Shishyula Katha	Music director
1954	Peddamanushulu	Music director
1964	Ramadasu	Music director
