= Raksha Rekha =

- Theatrical release poster
- Directed by: R. Padmanabhan
- Screenplay by: R. Padmanabhan
- Story by: Balijepalli Lakshmikantham
- Produced by: R. Padmanabhan
- Starring: Akkineni Nageswara Rao; Bhanumathi Ramakrishna; Anjali Devi
- Cinematography: T. Marconi
- Music by: Ogirala Ramachandra Rao; HR Padmanabha Sastry
- Production company: R. Padmanabhan Productions
- Release date: 30 April 1949
- Running time: 168 minutes
- Country: India
- Language: Telugu

Raksha Rekha (transl. Protection Line) is a 1949 Telugu-language swashbuckler film, produced and directed by R. Padmanabhan. It stars Akkineni Nageswara Rao, Bhanumathi Ramakrishna and Anjali Devi, with music composed by Ogirala Ramachandra Rao and H. R. Padmanabha Sastry.

== Cast ==
- Akkineni Nageswara Rao as Sudhakar
- Bhanumathi Ramakrishna as Kalavathi
- Anjali Devi as Chitra
- Kasturi Siva Rao as Dooradarsi
- Vangara as Mantravaadi
- Balijepalli Lakshmikantham as Maharju Parthapa
- Ramanatha Sastry as Maharaju Rajasimha
- Damerla Satyanarayana as Markandeya
- Kanakam as Yashini
- Jr. Lakshmirajyam as Chandrika
- Vijaya Lakshmi as Vasumathi

== Soundtrack ==
Music composed by Ogirala Ramachandra Rao, H. R. Padmanabha Sastry. Lyrics were written by Balijepalli Lakshmikantham.

Song title	Singers	length
"Bidiyama"	A. P. Komala	3:07
"Ravoyi Ravoyi"	A. P. Komala	3:19
"Oho Rajasukumara"	Bhanumathi Ramakrishna	2:58
"Rama Rama"	Ghantasala	0:50
"Abhayammu Neevegaa"	Bhanumathi Ramakrishna	2:48
"Neevuleni Jeevithame"	A. P. Komala	2:25
"Jeevana Doli"	Ghantasala, Bhanumathi Ramakrishna	3:17
"Cheyi Cheyi Kalupukora"	A. P. Komala, Kasturi Siva Rao	2:41
"Bhale Pillanu"	Kasturi Siva Rao	2:45
