= Mahiravana (film) =

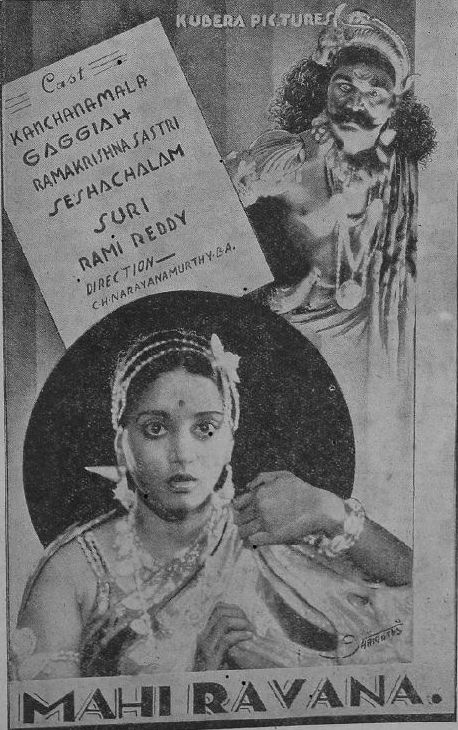
- Directed by: Chitrapu Narayana Rao
- Produced by: Ghantasala Balaramayya
- Starring: Vemuri Gaggayya; Kanchanamala
- Cinematography: Govindrao Bhadsavle
- Music by: Galipenchala Narasimha Rao
- Release date: 1940
- Country: India
- Language: Telugu

Mahiravana is a 1940 Indian Telugu-language film directed by Chitrapu Narayana Rao and produced by Ghantasala Balaramayya under the banner of Kubera Films. Veteran actor Vemuri Gaggayya played Ahiravan.

Mairavana turned out to be big hit because of its technical values. The directorial involvement with trick photography (Govindrao Bhadsavle) and opulent sets (T. V. S. Sarma) supported by the make-up (Mangayya) have contributed greatly to its success.

== Plot ==
The film is based on the story of Mahiravana, who ruled the lower world, Pathala. During the Ramayana, Ravana kept Sita in captivity. The war ensued with the involvement of Vanaras. Ravana's wife, Mandodari, plead to him to release Sita. She also warned him not to form an enmity with Lord Rama. Ravana refused to heed her advice and sought the help of Mahiravana to kill Lord Rama and Lakshmana. Anjaneya built a fortress using his tail to safeguard them. But Mahiravana, using his mystical powers, brought them to the Pathala Loka. The Pathala Queen, Devi Bandini, was a devotee of Lord Rama and wished to marry him. Rama killed Mahiravana with her help and promised to marry her in the future generations.

== Cast ==
- Vemuri Gaggayya as Ahiravan
- Kanchanamala as Chandrasena
- Rami Reddy
- Rayaprolu Subrahmanyam as Ravana
- T. Ramakrishna Sastry as Lord Rama
- Y. R. Suri as Anjaneya
- G. Seshachalam as Lakshmana
- K. Subrahmanya Kumari
- Nellore Krishnaiah as Matsyavallabha

== 1964 film ==
The film was remade in 1964 by B. A. Subba Rao. It starred Kanta Rao as Rama, Relangi as Anjaneya, Sobhan Babu as Lakshmana, Dhoolipala as Mairavana and Krishna Kumari as Chandrasena. S. Rajeswara Rao gave the music.
