= Sita Kalyanam (1934 Telugu film) =

1934 film directed by Chitrapu Narasimha Rao

Seetha Kalyanam
- Directed by: Chitrapu Narasimha Rao
- Written by: Ramana Murthy
- Produced by: Pinapala Venkata Dasu
- Starring: Bezawada Rajaratnam; Master Kalyani; Madhavapeddi Venkatramayya; T. Venkateswarlu
- Cinematography: K. Ramnoth
- Music by: Gali Penchala Narasimha Rao
- Production company: Vel Pictures
- Release date: 6 October 1934
- Running time: 133 minutes
- Country: India
- Language: Telugu

Sita Kalyanam is a 1934 Telugu-language Hindu mythological film directed by Chitrapu Narasimha Rao and produced by Pinapala Venkata Dasu (P. V. Dasu) under the banner of Vel Pictures. The film stars Bezawada Rajaratnam, Master Kalyani, and Madhavapeddi Venkatramayya, with music composed by Gali Penchala Narasimha Rao. Released on 6 October 1934, it was a commercial success.

The film holds historical significance as the first Telugu talkie to both feature outdoor sequences and be produced in Madras. It is also notable as the second Telugu talkie produced by a Telugu filmmaker.

== Plot ==
Sita Kalyanam is based on the story of Sita from the Ramayana, focusing on her marriage to Rama. The film emphasizes the divine and ceremonial aspects of the wedding, showcasing several key events leading up to their union.

== Cast ==
- Master Kalyani as Sri Rama
- Bezawada Rajaratnam as Seetha
- Madhavapeddi Venkatramayya as Viswamitra
- Nellore Nagarajarao as Dasaratha
- Govindarajula Venkatramayya as Janaka
- T. Venkateswarlu as Ravana
- Nageshwar Rao as Lakshmana
- Kamala Kumari as Ahalya
- Suribabu as Gautama
- Kruthiventi Venkata Subbarao as Mareecha
- Lanka Krishnamurthy as Subahu
- Srihari as Kausalya
- Dasari Ramatilakam as Kaikeyi
- Kokilamani as Sumitra

== Production ==
Pinapala Venkata Dasu (P. V. Doss), who had previously established Minerva Talkies in Machilipatnam and Srikrishna Talkies in Repalle, relocated to Madras, where he established Vel Pictures. He partnered with a few local Tamil individuals for this venture. Vel Pictures is considered to be the first Telugu talkie studio founded in Madras. Due to the lack of available studios at the time, the team rented the bungalow of the Pithapuram Raja and used temporary structures to facilitate film production.

Their first project was Sita Kalyanam, which became the second talkie film produced by a Telugu filmmaker. The film was an adaptation of Prabhat Film Company's Tamil film of the same name. Directed by Chitrapu Narasimha Rao, with K. Ramnoth as the cinematographer and A. K. Sekhar overseeing art direction. It was the first Telugu talkie to incorporate outdoor sequences, setting it apart from other early productions.

== Music ==
The soundtrack features devotional songs and verses relevant to the mythological theme. The film's songs, composed by Gali Penchala Narasimha Rao (Master Penchalayya), were well-received.

== Reception ==
Seetha Kalyanam was released on October 6, 1934, and was a commercial success, garnering praise for its devotional content and performances by the lead actors.
