= Iddaru Pellalu =

- Theatrical release poster
- Directed by: F. Nagur
- Written by: Kopalli Venkataramana Rao (dialogues)
- Story by: Nagur Cine Productions Unit
- Produced by: F. Nagur
- Starring: N. T. Rama Rao; Jamuna
- Cinematography: Kumar Devan
- Edited by: P. V. Narayana
- Music by: T. R. Pappa; T. K. Kumara Swamy; T. A. Kalyan Raman
- Production company: Nagur Cine Productions
- Release date: 6 October 1954
- Running time: 144 minutes
- Country: India
- Language: Telugu

Iddaru Pellalu (transl. Two wives) is a 1954 Indian Telugu-language drama film, produced and directed by F. Nagur. It stars N. T. Rama Rao and Jamuna, with music composed by T. R. Papa, T. K. Kumara Swamy & T. A. Kalyan Raman.

== Cast ==
- N. T. Rama Rao as Mallaiah
- Jamuna as Kannamma
- C.S.R as the Zamindar
- Kasturi Siva Rao as Appala Swamy
- K. V. Ramana Rao as Ramudu
- K. Ram Murthy as Shavkaru
- M. V. Rajamma as Radha
- Lakshmikantham as Pushpa Rani
- Gangaratnam as Lachi
- Kanakam as Appala Swamy's wife
- Dhanam as Miss Prema

== Soundtrack ==
Iddaru Pellalu

Film score by T. R. Papa T. K. Kumara Swamy T. A. Kalyan Raman
- Released: 1954
- Genre: Soundtrack
- Length: 25:11
- Producers: T. R. Papa; T. K. Kumara Swamy; T. A. Kalyan Raman

Music composed by T. R. Papa, T. K. Kumara Swamy & T. A. Kalyan Raman. Lyrics were written by Kopalli Venkataramana Rao.

S. No.	Song title	Singers	length
1	"Jaya Maata Kalyani"	V. Sarala	1:52
2	"My Face is"	V. Sarala	2:43
3	"Kantilo Nalakayu"	Madhavapeddi Satyam	2:34
4	"O Madana Raa"	Ghantasala, P. Leela	2:26
5	"Telesindi Nee Manasulona"	Ghantasala, P. Leela	2:52
6	"Tholiprema"	Ghantasala, P. Leela	3:16
7	"Nanu Chooda"	P. Leela	3:43
8	"Madilo Hai"	Ghantasala, P. Leela	4:45
