= Swargaseema =

- Film poster of Swargaseema
- Directed by: B. N. Reddy
- Screenplay by: B. N. Reddy
- Story by: Chakrapani
- Dialogue by: Samudrala Sr.
- Produced by: B. N. Reddy
- Starring: V. Nagayya; B. Jayamma; Bhanumathi Ramakrishna; Mudigonda Lingamurthy; Kasturi Sivarao; Chadalavada Kutumba Rao; C. H. Narayana Rao
- Cinematography: Marcus Bartley
- Edited by: V. S. Narayan
- Music by: V. Nagayya; Ogirala Ramchandra Rao
- Production company: Vauhini Studios
- Release date: 6 June 1945
- Running time: 118 minutes
- Country: India
- Language: Telugu

Swargaseema is a 1945 Telugu-language drama film produced and directed by B. N. Reddi and starring V. Nagayya, B. Jayamma and Bhanumathi. The film marked the debut of Ghantasala as a playback singer and Marcus Bartley as a cinematographer.

Released on June 6, 1945, Swargaseema celebrated a successful run of 200 days in theatres across Telugu-speaking regions as well as in present-day Tamil Nadu, Kerala, and Karnataka. Bhanumathi's role marked a significant comeback in her career following a hiatus from acting after her marriage in 1943. Swargaseema was among the first Telugu films to be screened at an international film festival, held in Vietnam.

== Plot ==
Murthy (Nagayya) is a publisher happily married to Kalyani (Jayamma) and the father of their children. After watching a street play in his village, he notices the talented Subbalakshmi (Bhanumathi) and advises her father to take her to Madras to pursue a career in theatre. Subbalakshmi travels to Madras, where she is offered a lead role and adopts the name Sujatha. Murthy becomes infatuated with Sujatha, leading him to neglect his family. Meanwhile, Kalyani struggles to support their children through small tailoring jobs. Ultimately, Murthy realizes his mistake and returns to his family.

== Cast ==
Cast according to the film titles:

- V. Nagayya as Murthy
- Jayamma as Kalyani
- Bhanumathi as Sujatha
- C. H. Narayana Rao as Narin
- Lingamurthy as Ganganna
- Siva Rao as Sreenivas
- Subba Rao, D. K. Seetapathi, Kangaswamy, Doraswamy, Nageswara Rao

== Production ==
=== Development ===
Swargaseema, produced and directed by B. N. Reddi, was inspired by the American film Blood and Sand (1941), directed by Rouben Mamoulian. Chakrapani adapted the story for the Telugu audience, with the character of the street dancer being inspired by Rita Hayworth's role in the original film.

=== Cast and crew ===
Bhanumathi, who had made her film debut at 14 and gained fame as a singer-actress, retired from acting by the age of 18 to focus on her marriage to P. S. Ramakrishna Rao. In 1944, she was persuaded by B. N. Reddi to return to acting for Swargaseema, drawing inspiration from Hayworth's performance in Blood and Sand. The film also marked the debut of Ghantasala as a playback singer and Marcus Bartley as a cinematographer.

== Music ==
Swargaseema

The music for Swargaseema was composed by V. Nagayya (also the male lead) and Ogirala Ramachandra Rao, with lyrics penned by Samudrala Raghavacharya and Balantrapu Rajanikantha Rao, who worked under the pseudonym Nalinikath. Bhanumathi contributed to the film’s iconic song "Oho ho paavuramaa" by recalling the Spanish tune "Varde Luna" from Blood and Sand and humming it to inspire the music composition. The song was praised for its melodious tune and became a significant highlight of the film.

Track list
No.	Title	Lyrics	Singer(s)	Length
1.	"Chalo Chalo Cycle"	Samudrala Sr.	Jayamma, Nagayya
2.	"Gruhame Kada Swargaseema"	Balantrapu Rajanikanta Rao	Jayamma, Nagayya
3.	"Hayi Sakhi Hayi Sakhi Bratuke Hayi Sakhi"	Balantrapu Rajanikanta Rao	Nagayya
4.	"Jo Achutananda Jojo Mukunda"	Annamacharya	Jayamma
5.	"Madhura Vennelareyi"	Samudrala Sr.	Bhanumathi, Nagayya
6.	"Manchidinamu Nede"		Bhanumathi
7.	"Oh Naa Raaja"	Samudrala Sr.	Ghantasala, Bhanumathi
8.	"Oho Ho Pavurama"	Balantrapu Rajanikanta Rao	Bhanumathi
9.	"Oho Tapodhana"	Balantrapu Rajanikanta Rao	Bhanumathi
10.	"Rara Radha Manoramana"	Samudrala Sr.	Jayamma

== Reception ==
Released on June 6, 1945, Swargaseema celebrated a successful run of 200 days in theatres across Telugu-speaking regions as well as in present-day Tamil Nadu, Kerala, and Karnataka. The film’s song sequence "Oho ho Paavuramaa," shot with exceptional panache by cinematographer Marcus Bartley, was particularly acclaimed. It was noted for its visual appeal, leading actor Sivaji Ganesan to watch the film multiple times just to see Bhanumathi's performance. The film’s success marked a significant comeback for Bhanumathi and solidified her legendary status in Indian cinema.
