= Kanchanamala =

Indian actress

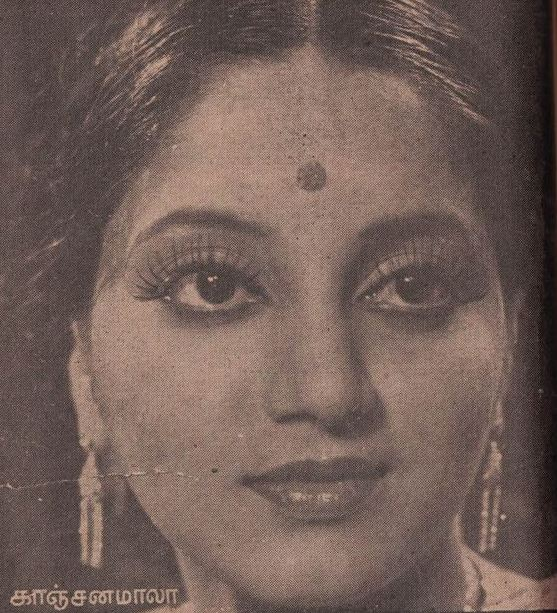
- Kanchanamala in Illalu (1940)
- Born: 5 March 1917; Tenali, Madras Presidency, British India
- Died: 24 January 1981 (aged 63); Madras, Tamil Nadu, India
- Occupation: Actor
- Spouse: Gali Venkaiah

Kanchanamala (1917–1981) was an Indian actress known for her work in Telugu cinema.

== Personal life ==
She was born in Tenali, Andhra Pradesh. During her childhood days, she went to live with her uncle who was a violin teacher. She was married to Gali Venkaiah, who died of tuberculosis.

== Career ==
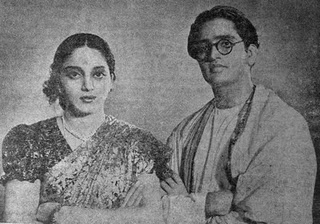
Kanchanamala and Umamaheswara Rao in Illalu (1940)

She started her film career in Srikrishna Tulabharam, in a minor role as Mitravinda in 1935. The film was based on a play by Telugu cinema's first lyricist Chandala Kesava Dasu. Relangi played a bit role in the movie.

She captured the audience with her beauty and played lead roles in films such as Veerabhimanyu, Gruhalakshmi and Malapilla.

During his stint as a production director with Vel Pictures, Ramabrahmam felt that she was not fit for acting and rejected her. As she rose in her career, he realised he was wrong and signed her for the harijan village girl Sampalatha in Malapilla, based on Gudipaati Venkata Chalam's unpublished novelette. Sceptics commented that she was a misfit for such a complex character. But she rendered a scintillating performance in the first half as an illiterate downtrodden village belle and as the literate modern city woman in the latter half of the film.

Her next role was as Uthara in Veerabhimanyu (1936) produced by Sagar Movietone in Bombay. Kodavatiganti Kutumba Rao debuted as a screenwriter with this film.

In Vandemataram, Chittoor Subrahmanya Pillai's Madhuranagarilo challanamma bodhu was used as a duet rendered by Nagaiah and Kanchanamala. Under the production of Gemini Movies, Kanchanamala signed a contract for the role of Nagamma in the movie Bala nagamma which included clause to work only under Gemini movies. During the filming of the movie, she had differences with the director and producer S. S. Vasan which led to legal entanglement. Unable to work in movies outside Gemini movies and having lost her husband caused despair and led to mental imbalance.

She later moved into her sister's place in her hometown Tenali.

== Cultural impact ==
Mothers of those days used to put their child to sleep humming this lullaby, "Dina Dinamu Papadni Deevinchi pondi Devalokamuloni Devathallaara", first performed by Kanchanamala.

Kanchanamala's photograph from the Malapilla film's promotional calendar adorned many homes and she generated such a "craze" among the cinema patrons.

== Filmography ==
=== Telugu ===
Year	Title	Role	Notes
1935	Srikrishna Thulabhaaram	Mitravinda	
1936	Veera Abhimanyu	Uttara	
1937	Vipranarayana	Devadevi	
1938	Gruhalakshmi	Madhuri	
1938	Malapilla	Sampalatha	Breakthrough Film
1939	Vande Mataram	Janaki	
1939	Malli Pelli	Lalitha	
1940	Illalu		
1940	Mahiravana	Chandrasena	
1942	Bala Nagamma	Balanagamma	
1963	Narthanasala	Guest Role	
