= Gali Penchala Narasimha Rao =

Gali Penchala Narasimha Rao గాలి పెంచల నరసింహారావు
- Also known as: Gali Penchala
- Born: 1903
- Died: 25 May 1964 (aged 60)
- Genres: Film music, Indian classical music
- Occupation: Music composer
- Years active: 1934–1961

Gali Penchala Narasimha Rao (1903–1964), also known as Gali Penchalayya, was an Indian film music composer. He was a representative of the first generation of music directors in Indian cinema. He debuted with the Telugu version of Seetha Kalyanam in 1934. Sri Krishna Leelalu (1935) was another musical hit of his. His music contributed to the success of Balaraju (1948); the songs Cheliya Kanarava by Ghantasala and Evarine Nenevarine by S. Varalakshmi were the melodies which attracted many those days.

Sasirekha Parinayam, also known as Maya Bazaar (1936) was his next film. The song Vivaha Bhojanambu in the 1957 version Mayabazar was originally composed by him for this 1936 film. The tune was inspired by Charles Penrose's famous song, The Laughing Policeman. Penrose first recorded the song under a pseudonym Charles Jolly in 1922.

Pendyala Nageswara Rao worked as a harmonist for Mayalokam in 1945. His most successful film was also his last film Sita Rama Kalyanam (1961) by N.A.T. Pictures. The songs tuned for the marriage of Sri Rama and Seetha are very often played during the many marriages of Telugu people. Seetharamula Kalyanam Chootamu Raarandi song really shows the beauty of lyrics and melodious tune.

He wrote and published two music books viz., "Ganakala" and "Ganavaridhi". He also composed 300 Tanavarnas with full notations (swaras) and 1000 keerthanas in Telugu. They are in different ragas, different talas and rare ragas also.

== Filmography ==
- Seetha Kalyanam (1934) (debut film)
- Sri Krishna Leelalu (1935)
- Sasirekha Parinayam (1936)
- Jarasandha (1938)
- Bhakta Markandeya (1938)
- Mahiravana (1940)
- Garuda Garvabhangam (1943)
- Krishna Prema (1943)
- Panthulamma (1943)
- Mayalokam (1945)
- Palnati Yudham (1947)
- Balaraju (1948)
- Dharmangada (1949)
- Agni Pareeksha (1951)
- Sita Rama Kalyanam (1961) (last film)
