= Veera Abhimanyu (1936 film) =

1936 Telugu film directed by V. D. Amin

- Directed by: V. D. Ameen
- Written by: Kodavatiganti Kutumba Rao
- Starring: Pulipati Venkateswarlu; Kanchanamala; Surabhi Kamalabai
- Production company: Select Pictures Circuit
- Release date: 24 October 1936
- Country: India
- Language: Telugu

Veera Abhimanyu is a 1936 Indian Telugu-language Hindu mythological film directed by V. D. Ameen and produced under the banner of Select Pictures Circuit. The film stars Pulipati Venkateswarlu, Kanchanamala, and Surabhi Kamalabai. The film was written by Kodavatiganti Kutumba Rao. It was released on 24 October 1936. The film was commercially successful.

== Plot ==
The plot of Veera Abhimanyu is based on the episode of Abhimanyu from the Mahabharata, focusing on his valour and tragic death in the battle of Kurukshetra. The film emphasizes Abhimanyu's bravery as he penetrates the Chakravyuha, a complex battle formation, and his ultimate sacrifice on the battlefield.

== Cast ==
- Pulipati Venkateswarlu
- Kanchanamala as Uttara
- Surabhi Kamalabai
- Mantravadi Venkata Joga Rao
- Sandhyaram Venkateswarlu
- Nagaratnam
- Haimavati
- Singaraju Nagabhushanam

== Music ==
The film featured both songs and poetry, with lyrics written by Sandhyaram Venkateswarlu. The songs were performed by Pulipati Venkateswarlu, Kanchanamala, Surabhi Kamalabai, and others.

Songs:

1. "Krishnaa Muraari Vinuthu Jethu Ninu Hari"

2. "Khanda Khandamuluga Chendedan Kurukulu Kaantaara" – Sung by Pulipati Venkateswarlu

3. "Jayaveera Jayasura Jayapaandu Narapaala" – Sung by a group

4. "Tanayaa Intha Dudukaa Maama Edala" – Sung by Surabhi Kamalabai

5. "Naa Tanayaa Sukumaara Eenaatiki Naakoorika" – Sung by Surabhi Kamalabai

6. "Pagathura Madhahari Vai Sangraamamu Na Jayeempan" – Sung by Surabhi Kamalabai

7. "Pranaya Madhura Vaanchithambhu Phalaroopamu Daalechu" – Sung by Kanchanamala

8. "Pranakantaa Kanaraadhaa Bhavadiya Mridumadhura" – Sung by Kanchanamala

9. "Praanaanatha Palkadagu Nee Anyamerugani Nannitu" – Sung by Kanchanamala

10. "Priya Chanamaa Anikin Vadigaa Sannaaha Veerundavai" – Sung by Kanchanamala

Padyams (Poems):

1. "Arjunaatmaja Divya Baanamulu Ganaga" – Sung by Pulipati Venkateswarlu

2. "Astranidi Natanchu Naadarintune Ninnu Arjunudu" – Sung by Pulipati Venkateswarlu

3. "Itani Shatruvu Marudauta Yerigiyundi" – Sung by Srihari

4. "Kalikirammani Jeerinan Gaugulinchi" – Sung by Kanchanamala

5. "Gaganaveedhini Mabbulu Galayugade" – Sung by Pulipati Venkateswarlu

6. "Gurudu Yuddhambunaku Vachchi Kontapori" – Sung by Pulipati Venkateswarlu

7. "Needu Kangava Kumpunu Negaduneni Eelugu Padunalugu" – Sung by Malpuri Dakshinamurthy

8. "Paramasaadvini Munnu Draupadini Sabhanu" – Sung by Pulipati Venkateswarlu

9. "Pragna Labhimanyudi Inkanu Balkanela" – Sung by Nagaratnam

== Production ==
Veera Abhimanyu was produced by Select Pictures Circuit, with Sandhyaram Venkateswarlu penning the lyrics and dialogue. The film's release on 24 October 1936 marked one of the early productions based on the Mahabharata.

== See also ==
- Veera Abhimanyu (1965 film)
