= Sitaram =

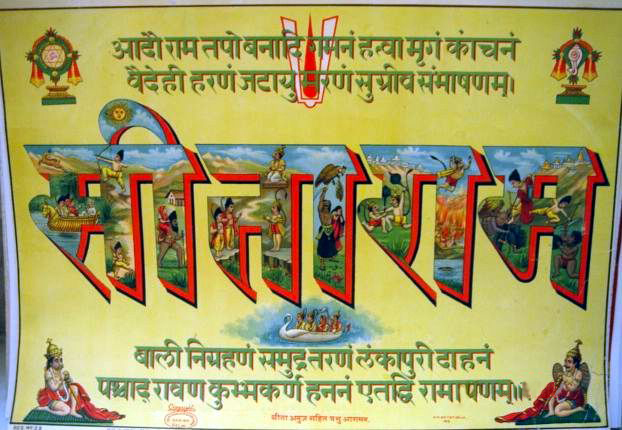
Sita-Rama, a combination of the names of Rama and Sita, is also used as a common greeting in some parts of the world.

Sitaram is a Hindu term for the deity Sita and Rama. It is also used as a greeting by Hindus in the Hindi Belt especially in the Awadh, Bhojpur, and Mithila regions as well as being used by the diaspora in Fiji, Guyana, Jamaica, Mauritius, Suriname, and Trinidad and Tobago. Sitaram is also a given name.

Notable people with the name Sitaram include:

- Raja Sitaram Ray (1658–1714), Bengali who fought against the Mughal Empire
- Sitaram Lalas (1912 – 1986), linguist and lexicographer, authored Rajasthani Sabad Kosh
- K. N. Sitaram (1889–1940), first Indian to head the famous Central Museum in Lahore
- Sitaram Chaturvedi (1907 – 2005), Indian educator
- Sitaram Kesri (1919 – 2000), Indian politician and President of Indian National Congress
- Sitaram Singh (1948 – 2014), member of the 14th Lok Sabha of India
- Sitaram Yadav (1946), member of the 14th Lok Sabha of India
- Sitaram Yechury (1952), Indian politician and senior member of the politburo of the Communist Party of India (Marxist)
- Sitaram Kattel, or Dhurmus, Nepalese comedian, actor and script writer
