= Gunasundari Katha =

- Directed by: K. V. Reddy
- Screenplay by: K. V. Reddy; Kamalakara Kameswara Rao
- Dialogue by: Pingali Nagendra Rao
- Story by: Pingali Nagendra Rao
- Produced by: K. V. Reddy
- Starring: Sriranjani; Kasturi Siva Rao; Vallabhajosyula Sivaram; Relangi; Govindarajula Subba Rao; Santha Kumari; K. Malathi
- Cinematography: Marcus Bartley
- Edited by: C. P. Jamboolingam
- Music by: Ogirala Ramachandra Rao
- Production company: Vauhini Studios
- Release date: 28 December 1949
- Running time: 172 minutes
- Country: India
- Language: Telugu

Gunasundari Katha (transl. Gunasundari's story) is a 1949 Indian Telugu language fantasy film produced and directed by K. V. Reddy, starring Sriranjani, Kasturi Siva Rao, Santha Kumari. The script was written by Pingali Nagendra Rao, K. V. Reddy, and Kamalakara Kameswara Rao. Kameswara Rao was also the associate director. William Shakespeare's play King Lear was the inspiration for the core plot. However the writers changed the tone from the tragedy of King Lear to a more entertaining one for the film. The film was commercially successful.

== Plot ==
King Ugrasena (Govindarajula Subba Rao) of Dhara Nagaram had three daughters: Rupasundari (Santakumari) who was married to her cousin Haramati (Subba Rao), Hemasundari (Malathi) who was married to her cousin Kalamata (Relangi), and Gunasundari (Sriranjani).

During a discussion, the King asked his daughters who they loved the most. Rupa and Hema told him they loved him the most, even more than their husbands. Gunasundari who is unmarried insists that she will love her husband the most once she is married. She goes on to say that she will love him more than her father regardless of his appearance or physical condition.

The king was offended and forced Gunasundari to marry a hideous and disabled man, Daivadheenam (Kasturi Siva Rao). After the arranged marriage to the ugliest man in the country, the king exiles his daughter to live outside the palace with her new husband whom she now loves more than the king.

Eventually, the King is wounded and develops a chronic illness. His physicians tell him the wound could only be cured with the diamond "Mahendra Mani". The King sends his three sons-in-law on a journey to find the diamond.

Daivadheenam overcomes his disabilities during the quest for "Mahendra Mani". No one knew that Daivadheenam was once a handsome prince who had been cursed by his guru for misconduct and character flaws. While fulfilling the quest of finding the diamond and overcoming his physical limitations Daivadheenam's character was fixed. He then brings the diamond to the palace and cures the king. This breaks Daivadheenam's curse and he is returned to his original form.

== Cast ==
Actor / Actress	Character
Govindarajula Subba Rao	King Ugrasena
Sriranjani	Gunasundari
Santha Kumari	Rupasundari
Malathi	Hemasundari
Vallabhajosyula Sivaram	
Kasturi Siva Rao	Daivadeenam
Relangi	Kalamati
Subba Rao	Haramati
T. G. Kamala Devi	

== Songs ==
All lyrics are written by Pingali Nagendra Rao; all music is composed by Ogirala Ramachandra Rao.

No.	Title	Singer(s)	Length
1.	"Adiye Eduraivachche Daka Pada Munduku Padipodam"	Relangi, Pamarti Krishna Murthy
2.	"Amma Mahalakshmi Dayacheyavamma"	Ghantasala
3.	"Challani Doravele O Chandamama"	Malathi, Shanta Kumari
4.	"Kala Kala Aa Kokilemo Palukarinche Vintiva"	Malathi, Shanta Kumari
5.	"Kalpagama Tallivai Ghanata Velasina Gouri"	P. Leela
6.	"O Chaaru Sheela Le Javarala"	V. Shivaram
7.	"O Matha Raavaa Naa Mora Vinavaa"	P. Leela
8.	"Ore Ore Brahma Devuda"	Kasturi Shiva Rao
9.	"Siri Thalam Vesenante"	Kasturi Shiva Rao, P. Leela
10.	"Sri Thulasi Jaya Thulasi Jayamuneeyave"	P. Leela
11.	"Thelusukondayya"	T. G. Kamala Devi, Chorus
12.	"Upakaara Gunaalayavai Vunnavu Kade Maatha"	P. Leela

"Sri Tulasi Jaya Tulasi", sung by P. Leela, was a hit with the public.
