= I. V. Subba Rao (civil servant) =

Indian civil servant born in 1955

Dr. I. V. Subba Rao Ph.D.
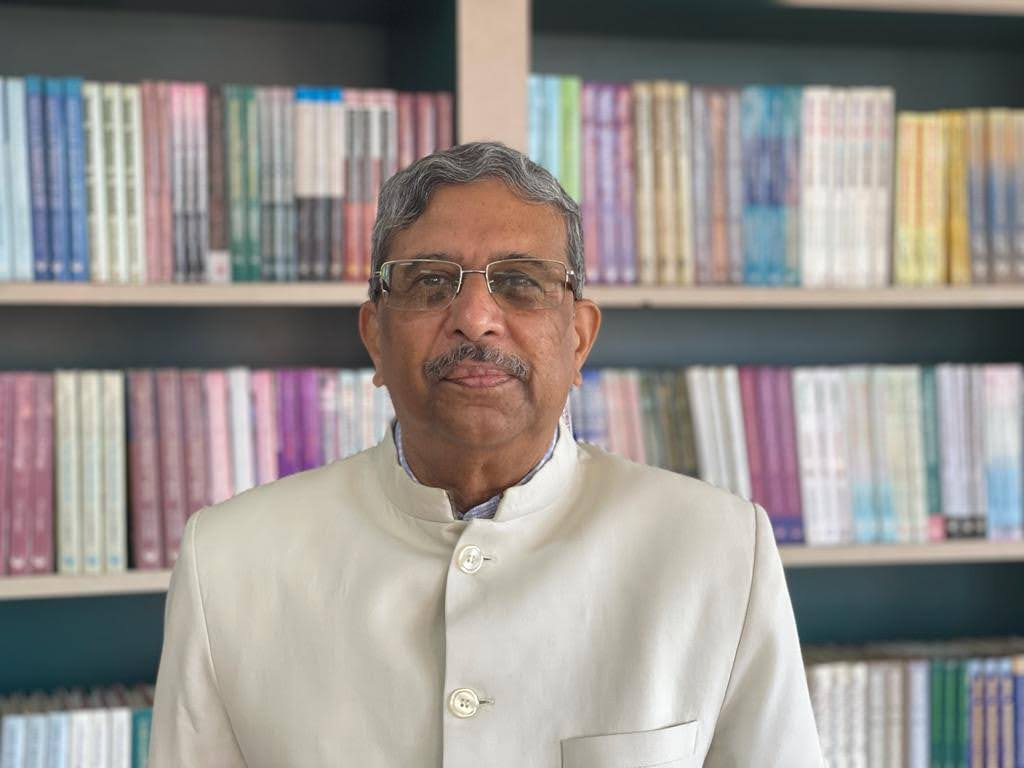

Secretary to the Vice-President of India
- In office 17 August 2017 – 18 August 2022
- Vice-President: M. Venkaiah Naidu

Chief Electoral Officer of Andhra Pradesh
- In office April 2008 – September 2010

Personal details
- Occupation: IAS officer

Ilapavuluri Venkata Subba Rao or Dr. I. V. Subba Rao is a retired Indian Administrative Service (IAS) officer of Andhra Pradesh cadre and 1979 batch who has served at various positions in the Government of India and the Government of Andhra Pradesh. He worked as the Secretary to the Vice-President of India from August 2017 to August 2022. He was member of Padma award committee 2023.

== Career ==
As Executive Officer (EO) at Tirumala Tirupati Devasthanams, one of the world’s most popular Hindu temples, during 1999-2000, he introduced, among other innovations, a new queue management system called ‘Su-darshanam’ to ensure a more pilgrim-friendly experience for over 18 million pilgrims who visit the shrine every year.

His tenure as the Chief Electoral Officer (CEO) of Andhra Pradesh State Election Commission (2008-2010) was marked by innovative measures to enhance transparency through the use of technology and enhance voter participation.

During 2000-2004, Subba Rao, as Principal Secretary, School Education, Government of Andhra Pradesh, provided leadership to a massive enrolment drive resulting in net enrollment at primary school level reaching 96 percent and a concerted effort to impart literacy skills to over 6 million adult illiterates. The Government of India invited him to lead the first Joint Review Mission of India’s flagship program of Education for All (Sarva Shiksha Abhiyan) in January, 2005.

Subba Rao initiated a comprehensive health sector reform as Principal Secretary, Health, Government of Andhra Pradesh during his tenure between 2004 and 2006. He designed a health insurance scheme - Arogyasri - to provide financial risk protection against catastrophic illnesses.

In 2011, Subba Rao was appointed as the Establishment Officer and Additional Secretary to Government of India.

=== UNESCO ===
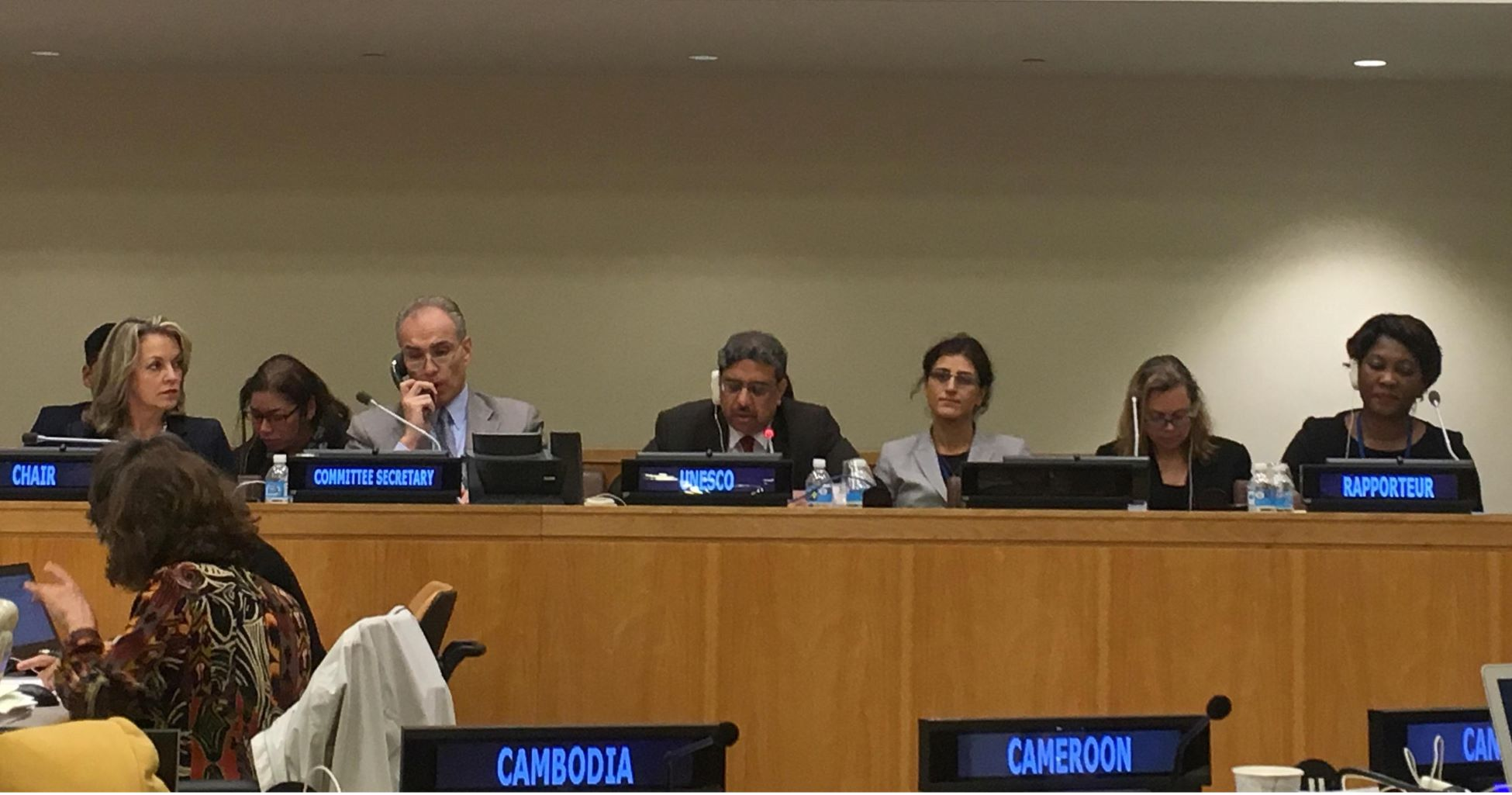
Subba Rao, presenting UNESCO Report at UN General Assembly, 2016

Subba Rao joined the United Nations Educational, Scientific and Cultural Organization (UNESCO) in Paris as Chief of Literacy and Non-Formal Education in 2011 and led the process of evaluation of United Nations Literacy Decade. He prepared and presented UNESCO’s reports on literacy at the United Nations General Assembly in 2014 and 2016 and provided leadership for the establishment of Global Alliance (GAL) for Literacy within the framework of lifelong learning, a multi-stakeholder partnership to advance the global literacy agenda.
