= Sri Krishna Tulabharam (1966 film) =

- Theatrical release poster
- Directed by: Kamalakara Kameswara Rao
- Written by: Samudrala Sr (dialogues)
- Produced by: D. Ramanaidu
- Starring: N. T. Rama Rao; Anjali Devi; Jamuna
- Cinematography: Annayya
- Edited by: K. A. Marthand
- Music by: Pendyala Nageswara Rao
- Production company: Suresh Productions
- Release date: 25 August 1966
- Running time: 178 mins
- Country: India
- Language: Telugu

Sri Krishna Tulabharam (transl. 'Sri Krishna's Tulabhara') is a 1966 Indian Telugu-language Hindu mythological film, produced by D. Ramanaidu under the Suresh Productions banner and directed by Kamalakara Kameswara Rao. It stars N. T. Rama Rao, Anjali Devi, Kanta Rao and Jamuna with music composed by Pendyala Nageswara Rao.

== Plot ==
The film begins with Krishna & Satyabhama returning to Dwaraka after defeating Narakasura. Hereupon, Satyabhama is deluded that herself as the victory's leading cause. Meanwhile, Narada obtains a Parijata flower from heaven, bestows it on Krishna, and requests the honor for Krishna's prime consort, and Krishna endorses it to Rukmini. This infuriates Satyabhama, making her annoyed toward Krishna. Ergo, he oaths her to accord the entire Parijat tree and plant it in her garden. Next, Krishna lands in heaven, confronts Indra, wins the tree, and gifts it to Satyabhama.

Consequently, her pride magnifies tenfold, and she looks at Rukmini at a low pace. Following, on Rukmini's birthday, she invites Krishna for hospitality, which Satyabhama denies. Anyhow, the Lord surrenders for Rukmini's devotion. Thus, Satyabhama aims to hold proprietorial power over him and possess all his love. Hence, to enlighten her, Narada derives a game to perform a ritual called Sri Krishna Tulabharam, i.e., to donate her husband with the Parijat tree and recoup him by weighing him with equivalent wealth.

Here, the deluded divine consort Satyabhama fails leading to Narada purportedly carrying Krishna and auctioning him in the streets. At this, the public revolts, and all the fellow wives plead with Narada to acquit Krishna in lieu of their possessions. Then, he proclaims that the Lord grants only devotion, and the one & only who does so in the universe is Rukmini. Accordingly, Satyabhama bows her head down before Rukmini, who retrieves Krishna with Tulasidalam, the Basil leaf. Finally, the movie ends with Satyabhama perceiving the Lord's form and being freed from delusion.

== Cast ==
- N. T. Rama Rao as Lord Krishna
- Anjali Devi as Rukmini
- Jamuna as Satyabhama
- Kanta Rao as Narada Maharshi
- Rajanala as Indra
- Padmanabham as Vasanthaka
- Mikkilineni as Vasudeva
- Krishna Kumari as Jambavati
- S. Varalakshmi as Sachee Devi
- Vanisri as Nalini
- L. Vijayalakshmi as Rambha
- Vijaya Lalitha
- Rushyendramani as Aditi
- Jayanthi
- Meena Kumari as Malathi
- Nirmalamma as Devaki

== Soundtrack ==
Sri Krishna Tulabharam

Film score by Pendyala Nageswara Rao
- Released: 1966
- Genre: Soundtrack
- Label: EMI Columbia
- Producer: Pendyala Nageswara Rao

Music composed by Pendyala Nageswara Rao. Music released by EMI Columbia Audio Company.

S. No.	Song title	Lyrics	Singers	length
1	"Jaya Ho"	Samudrala Sr.	Ghantasala, P. Susheela	2:24
2	"Oho Mohana Roopa"	Sri Sri	Ghantasala, P. Susheela	5:56
3	"O Cheli Kopama"	Dasaradhi	Ghantasala	3:50
4	"Konu Meede Kusumanjali"	Samudrala Sr.	P. Susheela	4:02
5	"Idi Saragaala Tota"	Aarudhra	P. Susheela, L. R. Eeswari	4:09
6	"Yemduke Naameda"	Kosaraju	Madhavapeddi Satyam, L. R. Eeswari, Vasantha	2:38
7	"Karuninchave Tulasi Maata"	Samudrala Sr.	P. Susheela, S. Janaki	4:26
8	"Meerajalagalada"	Sthanam Narasimha Rao.	P. Susheela	3:26
9	"Bhale Manchi"	Chandala Kesava Dasu	Ghantasala, P. Susheela	4:44
10	"Vidhudu Nee Maata"	Samudrala Sr.	S. Varalakshmi	0:30
11	"Indra Krishna Parijata"	Samudrala Sr.	Ghantasala, Madhavapeddi Satyam	2:00
12	"Rukmini Puttinanadu"	Samudrala Sr.	Ghantasala, P. Susheela, P. Leela	4:13
13	"Tulabhara Yojana"	Samudrala Sr.	Ghantasala, P. Susheela	2:35
14	"Krishna Tulabharam"	Samudrala Sr.	Ghantasala	2:23
15	"Satyabhama Garvabhanga"	Samudrala Sr.	Ghantasala, P. Susheela	3:06
