= Illalu (1940 film) =

- Illalu 1940 film poster
- Directed by: Gudavalli Ramabrahmam
- Written by: Tapi Dharma Rao (Dialogues ) Tapi Dharma Rao and Basavaraju Apparao (lyrics)
- Starring: V. Umamaheswara Rao; Kanchanamala; Lakshmi Rajyam
- Music by: S. Rajeswara Rao
- Production company: Indira Devi Films
- Release date: 27 September 1940
- Country: India
- Language: Telugu

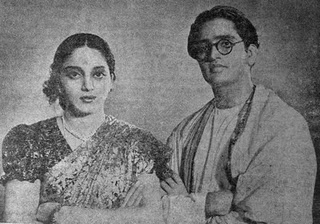
Umamaheswara Rao and Kanchanamala in Illalu 1940 film.

Illalu (transl. Housewife) is a 1940 Telugu-language drama film directed by Gudavalli Ramabrahmam.

== Plot ==
Murthy (Umamaheswara Rao) and Indira (Kanachanamala) are happily married. Subsequently, Murthy falls in love with Leela (Lakshmi Rajyam), an educated and sophisticated lady. He brings her home as his second wife, which devastates Indira. However Indira performs her duties as the devoted housewife on one side and wins over her husband with patience and perseverance. Finally Indira emerges successful and they lived happily.

== Cast ==
Actor / Actress	Character
V. Umamaheswara Rao	Murthy
Kanchanamala	Indira, wife of Murthy
Lakshmi Rajyam	Leela
S. Rajeswara Rao	Madhu
R. Balasaraswathi Devi	Sarala, wife of Madhu
S. Varalakshmi	
P. Suribabu	Radio artist

== Soundtrack ==
Illalu

Soundtrack album by S. Rajeswara Rao
- Released: 1940
- Language: Telugu

There are some melodious songs written by Tapi Dharma Rao. Music is scored by S. Rajeswara Rao.

1. "Dina Dinamu Papadni Deevinchipondi Devalokamuloni Devathallaara" (Singer: Kanchanamala)
2. "Jalavihagaali Gaana Vinoda" (Singers: Umamaheswara Rao and Lakshmi Rajyam)
3. "Kavyapaanamu Chesi Kaipekkinaane" (Singers: Rajeswara Rao and Balasaraswati)
4. "Koyilokasari Vachi Koosi Poyane" (Singer: S. Varalakshmi)
5. "Neepai Mohamuno Krishna Nilupagalemoyi Krishna" (Singers: P. Suribabu and S. Varalakshmi)
6. "Suma Komala Kanulela Kala Kaadanuma Bala" (Singers: Rajeswara Rao and Balasaraswati)

== Box office ==
- It was a hit in those days, resulting in production of many films with similar concept.
