= C. Lakshmi Rajyam =

Indian actress, film producer (1922–1987)

C. Lakshmi Rajam
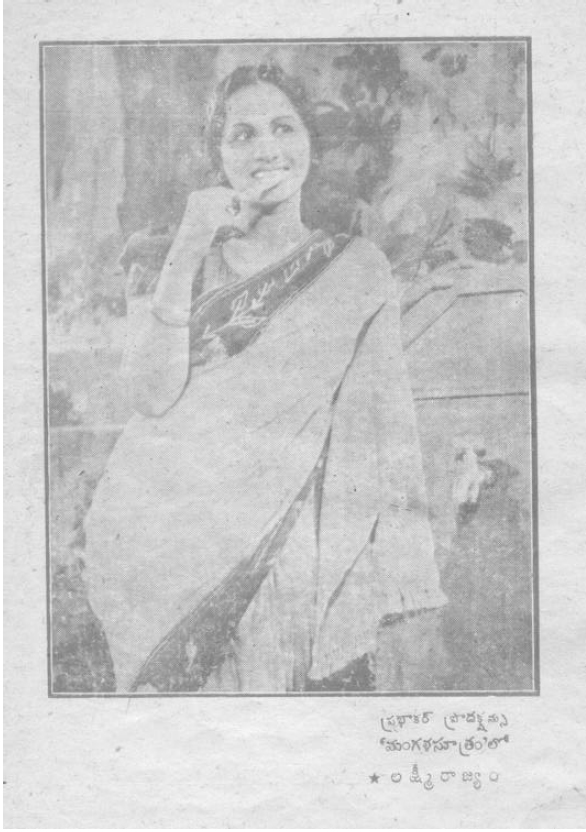
- Born: 1922; Owk, Kurnool District, Madras Presidency, British India
- Died: 1987 (aged 64–65)
- Occupations: Actress; producer
- Spouse: K. Sridhar Rao

C. Lakshmi Rajyam, or shortly Lakshmirajyam (1922–1987), was a Telugu and Tamil film and drama actress and film producer from the 1930s to 1970s.

She was a native of Owk and developed a passion for music early in life, learning the art from her uncle Narasimham. She also studied Harikatha under the guidance of Saluri Rajeswara Rao. Together with her other uncle, Venkata Ramaiah, she joined the drama company of Puvvula Suri Babu. On stage, she gained recognition for her roles, playing Nalini in Tulabaram and Chitra in Chintamani. Pulipati Venkateswarlu and Puvvula Ramatilakam, pioneers of early Telugu theatre and cinema, were her contemporaries.

She started her film career as a child artist in Sri Krishna Leelalu (1934) and later acted in about 35 films, mostly in the Telugu language. She became a famous actress after playing the role of the second heroine in Illalu (1940) directed by Gudavalli Ramabrahmam.

She married K. Sridhar Rao and established Rajyam Pictures in 1951. They produced about 11 films, including Daasi (1952), Krishna Leelalu (1959), Harischandra (1960), Narthanasala (1963), Sakuntala (1966) and Govula Gopanna (1968), Rangeli Raja (1971)

== Filmography ==
=== Telugu films ===
1. Sri Krishna Leelalu (1935) as Radha
2. Srikrishna Thulabhaaram (1935)
3. Sasirekha Parinayam (1936)
4. Amma (1939)
5. Illalu (1940)
6. Apavadu (1941)
7. Panthulamma (1943)
8. Mangalsutram (1946)
9. Narada Naradi (1946)
10. Tyagayya (1946)
11. Drohi (1948) ... Seeta
12. Paramanandayya Sishyulu (1950) ... Leelavathi
13. Samsaram (1950) ... Manjula
14. Agni Pareeksha (1951) ... Suseeia
15. Akasaraju (1951)
16. Mayalamari (1951)
17. Mayapilla (1951)
18. Daasi (1952) (actor and producer)
19. Praja Seva (1952)
20. Raju Peda (1954)
21. Ettuku Pai Ettu (1958)
22. Krishna Leelalu (1959) (actor and producer)...Yasodha
23. Maragatham (1959)
24. Harishchandra (1960) (actor and producer)
25. Vimala (1960)
26. Batasari (1961)
27. Narthanasala (1963) (actor and producer)...Subhadra
28. Sakunthala (1966) (actor and producer)
29. Govula Gopanna (1968) (actor and producer)
30. Rangeli Raja (1971) (actor and producer)
31. Magaadu (1976) (producer)

=== Tamil films ===
1. Velaikari Magal (1953) (actor and producer)
2. Maragatham (1959)
3. Mannadhi Mannan (1960) as dancer
4. Kuzhandhaigal Kanda Kudiyarasu (1960)
5. Kongunattu Thangam (1961)
6. Kanaal Neer (1961)
7. Iruvar Ullam (1963)
8. Bommai (1964)
