= Ghantasala Balaramayya =

Indian film director, producer, and actor

- Born: Andhra Pradesh, India
- Occupations: Film director; Producer; Actor
- Relatives: S. Thaman (Grandson)

Ghantasala Balaramayya was an Indian film director, producer, and actor in Telugu cinema. His notable films include Sri Seetarama Jananam (1944), Balaraju (1948), Swapna Sundari (1950), and Sri Lakshmamma Katha (1950). Balaramayya is known for providing Akkineni Nageswara Rao his first lead role in the 1944 mythological film Sri Seetarama Jananam.

== Biography ==
Ghantasala Balaramayya was born in 1906 in Pottepalem in Nellore District, Andhra Pradesh into a Brahmin family. He started his career as a stage singer and later started to produce and direct. He is the grandfather of the music director S. Thaman.

Balaramayya cast Akkineni Nageswara Rao in his first lead role in the 1944 film Sri Seetarama Jananam.

"One day, I was at a railway station with my drama troupe and to my good luck, Ghantasala Balaramayya garu (producer-director) spotted me standing nearby. He walked up to me and asked me if I want to work in films. I didn't think twice and just went along with him. The rest as they say is history. To me, Balaramayya is more important than God. If he hadn't spotted me that day, I wouldn't have been where I am today." — Akkineni Nageswara Rao on Ghantasala Balaramayya.

== Filmography ==
=== Director ===
- Chinna Kodalu (1952)
- Sri Lakshmamma Katha (1950)
- Swapna Sundari (1950)
- Balaraju (1948)
- Mugguru Maratilu (1946)
- Garuda Garvabhangam (1943)
- Sri Seeta Rama Jananam (1942)
- Parvati Kalyanam (1941)

=== Producer ===
- Swapna Sundari (1950)
- Garuda Garvabhangam (1943)
- Parvati Kalyanam (1941)
- Mahiravana (1940)
- Bhakta Markandeya (1938)

=== Actor ===
- Sati Tulasi (1936)
- Ramadasu (1933)

=== Story ===
- Rechukka (1955)
