= Kasturi Siva Rao =

Indian actor

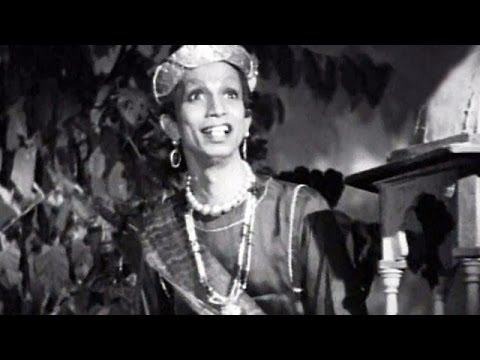
- Screenshot of Rao
- Born: 6 March 1913; Kakinada, British India (now in Andhra Pradesh, India)
- Died: 24 February 1966 (aged 52); Tenali, Andhra Pradesh
- Spouse: Shakuntala Kasturi
- Children: Three Sons and Four Daughters
- Parents: Kasturi Krishnanandam (father); Kasturi Ramamma (mother)

Kasturi Siva Rao (6 March 1913 – 24 February 1966) was an Indian actor, comedian, playback singer, producer and director known for his works in Telugu cinema. He was one of the first star comedians of Telugu cinema.

== Career ==
Kasturi Siva Rao started his career in the film industry as a movie narrator for the silent films produced at that time. Besides providing commentary, he was also a projector operator and had a unique humor to his fame. Theaters would advertise films as having "commentary by Siva Rao". He became an actor with the film Vara Vikrayam in 1939 and shot into the limelight with Chudamani in 1941. B N Reddy's Swarga Seema in 1945 and Balaraju in 1948 catapulted him to stardom.

He became a lead actor with the film Gunasundari Katha in 1949, in which he played the role of a cursed prince. The film became a huge hit and his mannerisms and dialogue were so popular that people started conversing in the same tone. He owned a Buick, which was a rare possession being a luxury import and was seen as a status symbol. Whenever people saw the car on roads they used to swarm it and run along side it. Kasturi Siva Rao later on became a producer and director with the film Paramanandayya Sishyulu in 1950.

== Selected filmography ==
- Swarga Seema (స్వర్గసీమ)
- Balaraju (బాలరాజు) 28 February 1948 Supporting Actor & playback singer
- Laila Majnu (లైలా మజ్ను) 1 October 1949 Supporting Actor
- Raksha Rekha (రక్షరేఖ) 1949 Supporting Actor
- Gunasundari Katha (గుణసుందరి కథ) 1 October 1949 Hero and playback singer
- Paramanandayya Sishyulu (పరమానందయ్య శిష్యులు) 1950 Supporting Actor, Producer, Director
- Swapna Sundari (స్వప్న సుందరి) 1950 Supporting Actor
- Sri Lakshmamma Katha (శ్రీ లక్ష్మమ్మ కథ) 1950 Supporting Actor & playback singer
- Mantra Dandam 1951
- Stree Sahasam (స్త్రీ సాహసం) 1951 Supporting Actor
- Prema (ప్రేమ) 1952 Supporting Actor
- Iddaru Pellalu 1954
- Panduranga Mahatyam (పాండురంగ మహత్యం) 28 November 1957 Supporting Actor
- Dongalunnaru Jagratha 1958
- Appu Chesi Pappu Koodu (అప్పు చేసి పప్పు కూడు) 14 January 1959 Supporting Actor ( Takku )
- Raja Makutam (రాజమకుటం) 24 February 1960 Supporting Actor
- Seetharama Kalyanam (సీతారామ కళ్యాణం) 6 January 1961 Supporting Actor
- Mugguru Maratilu
- Mayalamaari
