= Akkineni Nageswara Rao filmography =

This is the filmography of prominent Telugu cinema actor Akkineni Nageswara Rao.

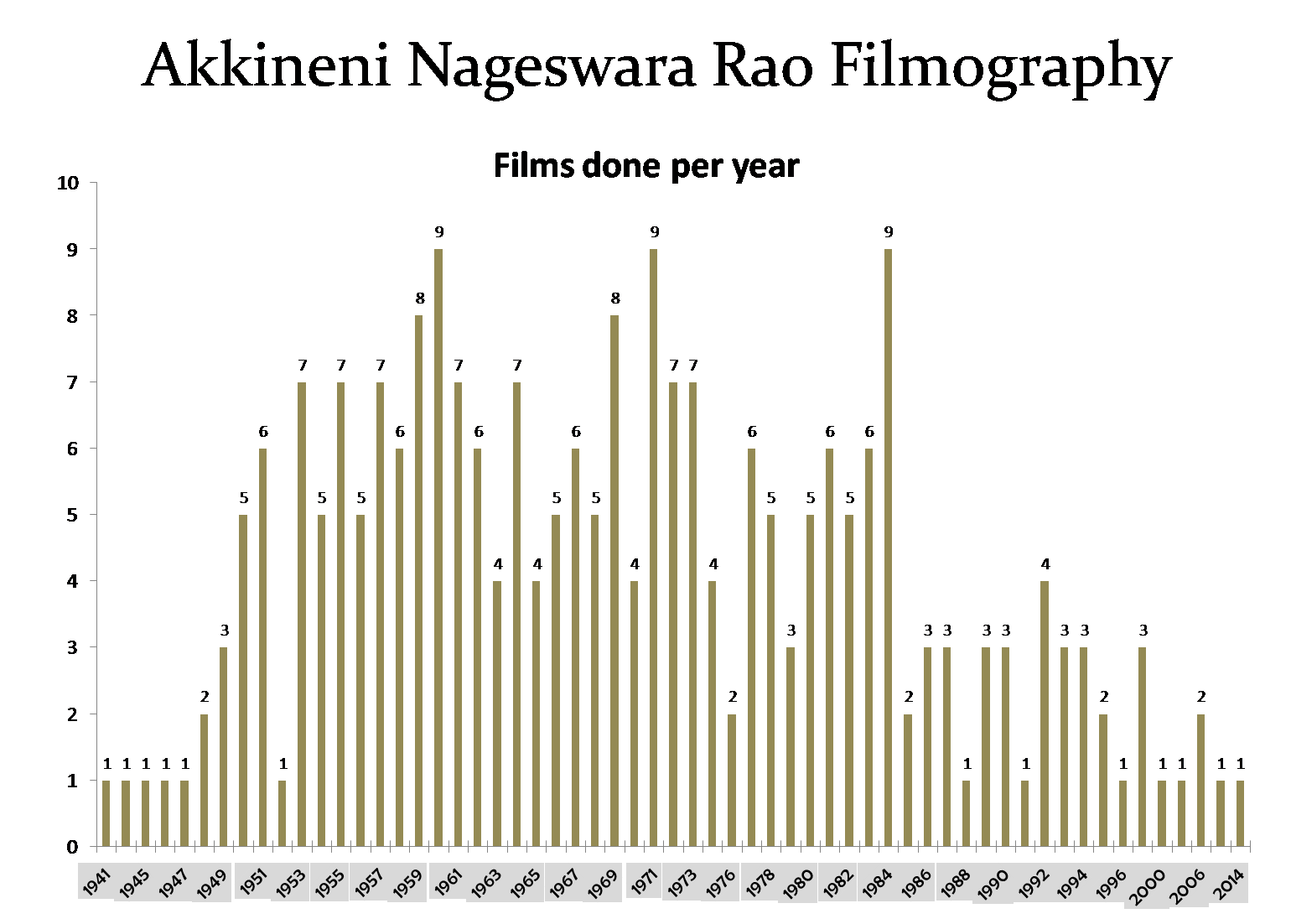
Filmography chart of the films done per year by actor Akkineni Nageswara Rao

== Filmography ==
=== Telugu films ===
Year	Film	Role(s)	Notes	Ref(s)
1941	Dharma Patni	Student	One of the ten school children in a song	
1944	Sri Seeta Rama Jananam	Lord Rama	Debut in a lead role	
1945	Mayalokam	Sarabandi Raju		
1946	Mugguru Maratilu	Firoji		
1947	Palnati Yuddham	Balachandrudu		
1948	Ratnamala	Chandrakanth		
1948	Balaraju	Balaraju		
1949	Keelu Gurram	Vikrama	dubbed in Tamil in 1949 as Maya Kuthirai; First Telugu film dubbed into Tamil	
1949	Raksha Rekha	Sudhakar		
1949	Laila Majnu	Qais/Majnu	dubbed in Tamil in 1949 as Laila Majnu	
1950	Sri Lakshmamma Katha	Venkayya Naidu	dubbed in Tamil in 1950 as Lakshmamma	
1950	Palletoori Pilla	Vasanth		
1950	Paramanandayya Sishyulu	Chandrasena		
1950	Swapna Sundari	Prabhu	dubbed in Tamil in 1950 as Swapna Sundari	
1950	Samsaram	Venu		
1951	Tilottama	Deva Duttudu		
1951	Soudamini	Udaysena		
1951	Mayalamari	Raghu		
1951	Mantra Dandam	Siva Prasad	dubbed in Tamil in 1958 as Arasaala Piranthavan	
1951	Stree Sahasam	Raja Sekhara		
1952	Prema	Raja		
1953	Paradesi	Chandram		
1953	Bratuku Teruvu	Mohan Rao	dubbed in Tamil in 1956 as Bale Raman	
1953	Kanna Talli	Ramu		
1953	Vayyari Bhama	Chadrayya		
1953	Devadasu	Devdas		
1954	Nirupedalu	Narayaana		
1954	Chakrapani	Venkatachalam		
1954	Parivartana	Satyam		
1954	Vipra Narayana	Vipranarayana	dubbed in Tamil in 1955 as Vipra Narayana	
1954	Annadata	Bangarayya	dubbed in Tamil in 1957 as Karpin Jothi	
1955	Missamma	A.K.Raju		
1955	Ardhangi	Raghavendra Rao / Raghu		
1955	Rojulu Marayi	Venu		
1955	Anarkali	Saleem	dubbed in Tamil in 1955 as Anarkali	
1955	Santaanam	Ramu	dubbed in Tamil in 1955 as Santaanam	
1955	Vadina	Raghu		
1955	Donga Ramudu	Ramu	dubbed in Tamil in 1956 as Thiruttu Raman	
1956	Tenali Ramakrishna	Tenali Ramakrishna		
1956	Bhale Ramudu	Ramakrishna		
1956	Ilavelpu	Shekar		
1956	Charana Daasi	Venu		
1957	Thodi Kodallu	Satyam		
1957	Sati Savitri	Satyavanthudu	dubbed in Tamil in 1957 as Sathiyavan Savithri	
1957	Mayabazar	Abhimanyudu		
1957	Allavuddin Adbhutadeepam	Allavuddin		
1957	Suvarna Sundari	Jayanth		
1957	Dongallo Dora	Anand	dubbed in Tamil in 1957 as Pakka Thirudan	
1958	Bhookailas	Narada	dubbed in Tamil in 1958 as Bhakta Ravana	
1958	Chenchu Lakshmi	Vishnu		
1958	Sri Krishna Maya	Narada		
1958	Aada Pettanam	Krishna		
1958	Pellinaati Pramanalu	Krishna Rao		
1959	Mangalya Balam	Chandra Shekar		
1959	Pelli Sandadi	Mr.Nath / Vasu		
1959	Jayabheri	Kasinath Sastry		
1959	Illarikam	Venu		
1960	Nammina Bantu	Prasad		
1960	Santhi Nivasam	Gopi		
1960	Mahakavi Kalidasu	Kalidasu		
1960	Pelli Kanuka	Bhaskar		
1960	Abhimanam	Venu		
1960	Runanubandham	Suryam		
1960	Maa Babu	Dr. Anand		
1961	Velugu Needalu	Chandra Shekar		
1961	Bharya Bhartalu	Anand		
1961	Bhakta Jayadeva	Jayadeva		
1961	Batasari	Surendra		
1961	Vagdanam	Dr. Suryam		
1961	Sabhash Raja	Raja		
1961	Iddaru Mitrulu	Ajay & Vijay	dual role	
1962	Aradhana	Dr. Krishna		
1962	Manchi Manasulu	Venu		
1962	Gundamma Katha	Raja		
1962	Kalimilemulu	Raju		
1962	Kula Gotralu	Ravi		
1962	Siri Sampadalu	Prasad		
1963	Sri Krishnarjuna Yuddhamu	Arjuna	dubbed in Tamil in 1963 as Sri Krishnarjuna Yuddham	
1963	Chaduvukunna Ammayilu	Shekar		
1963	Punarjanma	Gopi		
1964	Pooja Phalam	Madhu		
1964	Bhakta Ramadasu	Lord Vishnu		
1964	Aathma Balam	Anand		
1964	Mooga Manasulu	Gopi		
1964	Murali Krishna	Dr. Krishna		
1964	Amara Silpi Jakkanna	Jakkanna		
1964	Doctor Chakravarty	Dr. Chakravarti		
1965	Sumangali	Viswam		
1965	Antastulu	Raghu		
1965	Preminchi Choodu	Ranga Rao		
1965	Manushulu Mamathalu	Venu		
1966	Zamindar	Seshagiri Rao / Seshu		
1966	Aatma Gowravam	Srinivasa Rao		
1966	Navaratri	Anand Rao; Devadasu; Dr. Karunakar; Gopala Rao; Shantaiyah; Siripuram Sundaramaiyah; Bhagavatha Rao; Commissioner Veerabhadra Rao; Venu Gopal Rao	Nine roles and Telugu remake of Navarathri (1964 film) and also a film narrated by Jaggayya	
1966	Manase Mandiram	Dr. Raghu		
1966	Aastiparulu	Krishna / Seenu		
1967	Gruhalakshmi	Chitti Babu		
1967	Prana Mithrulu	Chinna		
1967	Sati Sumathi	Lord Vishnu		
1967	Vasantha Sena	Chaarudattudu		
1967	Rahasyam	Mandakudu		
1967	Poola Rangadu	Ranga Rao		
1968	Brahmachari	Ramakrishna		
1968	Manchi Kutumbam	Venu Gopal Rao		
1968	Govula Gopanna	Gopi & Shekar	dual role	
1968	Sudigundalu	Justice Chandra Shekar		
1968	Bangaru Gaajulu	Ramu / Ravi		
1969	Adrushtavanthulu	Raghu		
1969	Mooga Nomu	Venu		
1969	Bandipotu Dongalu	Krishna / Kanna		
1969	Aadarsa Kutumbam	Prasad		
1969	Aatmiyulu	Suryam		
1969	Bhale Rangadu	Ranga		
1969	Buddhimantudu	Madhavachary & Gopi	dual role	
1969	Sipayi Chinnayya	Chinnayya & Bhaskar	dual role	
1970	Akka Chellelu	Justice Ramchandra Rao Raju	dual role	
1970	Jai Jawan	Captain Ravindranath		
1970	Maro Prapancham	Ravindranath		
1970	Dharma Daata	Raja Raghupathi Rao Sekhar	dual role	
1970	Iddaru Ammayilu	Madhusudhana Rao		
1971	Dasara Bullodu	Gopi		
1971	Manasu Mangalyam	Ravindra Babu		
1971	Pavitra Bandham	Ashok / Raja		
1971	Rangeli Raja	Raja		
1971	Suputhrudu	Gopi		
1971	Amaayakuraalu	Shekar		
1971	Srimanthudu	Raja		
1971	Prema Nagar	Kalyan		
1972	Bharya Biddalu	Mohan		
1972	Raitu Kutumbam	Ramu		
1972	Beedala Patlu	Kotayya / Dayanidhi / K. V. Purushotham		
1972	Manchi Rojulu Vachchaayi	Gopalam		
1972	Datta Putrudu	Ramanna		
1972	Vichitra Bandham	Madhav		
1972	Koduku Kodalu	Raja Shekar		
1973	Bangaru Babu	Buchi Babu		
1973	Kanna Koduku	Krishna		
1973	Bhakta Tukaram	Tukaram		
1973	Palletoori Bava	Yedukondalu		
1973	Andala Ramudu	Seetarama Rao		
1973	Marapurani Manishi	Abbi		
1973	Manchivadu	Anand & Satyam	dual role	
1974	Premalu Pellillu	Dr. Madhu		
1974	Bangaaru Kalalu	Ravi		
1974	Dorababu	Chandram		
1976	Mahakavi Kshetrayya	Varadayya / Kshetrayya		
1976	Secretary	Raja Shekar		
1976	Mahatmudu	Venu Gopal		
1977	Chakradhari	Gora Kumbhar		
1977	Aalu Magalu	Dr. Gopi Krishna		
1977	Bangaru Bommalu	Gopi		
1977	Raja Ramesh	Raja Ramesh		
1977	Chanakya Chandragupta	Chanakya		
1977	Aatmiyudu	Ranga		
1978	Chilipi Krishnudu	Dr. Krishna		
1978	Devadasu Malli Puttadu	Devadas / Sridhar Raja		
1978	Vichitra Jeevitham	Chandra Shekar		
1978	Rama Krishnulu	Krishna		
1978	Sri Rama Raksha	Ramu & Gopi	dual role	
1978	Ravanude Ramudayithe?	Nagaraju		
1979	Hema Hemeelu	Red Lion Raghuveer Ramachandra	dual role	
1979	Muddula Koduku	Gopi		
1979	Andaman Ammayi	Shekar		
1980	Yedanthasthula Meda	Ranga Rao & Venu	dual role	
1980	Nayakudu Vinayakudu	Chiranjeevi		
1980	Buchi Babu	Buchi Babu		
1980	Pilla Zamindar	Madhu & Balaaraju	dual role	
1981	Srivari Muchatlu	Gopi		
1981	Premabhishekam	Rajesh		
1981	Guru Sishyulu	Kalyan		
1981	Satyam Shivam	Satyam		
1981	Prema Kanuka	Raja Shekar		
1981	Prema Mandiram	Pedababu Sarva Rayudu Chinnababu	dual role	
1982	Raaga Deepam	Chakravarthy		
1982	Bangaru Kanuka	Ramesh		
1982	Gopala Krishnudu	Gopala Krishna Dr.Murthy	dual role	
1982	Meghasandesam	Ravindra Babu		
1982	Yuvaraju	Rajesh		
1983	Muddula Mogudu	Prasad		
1983	Oorantha Sankranthi	Venu		
1983	Ramudu Kadu Krishnudu	Ramu & Krishna	dual role	
1983	Bahudoorapu Batasari	Prasad		
1983	Amarajeevi	Dr. Murali		
1983	Sri Ranga Neethulu	Rajesh		
1984	Koteeswarudu	Krishna		
1984	Tandava Krishnudu	Chakravarthy		
1984	Anubandham	Rajesh		
1984	Adarshavanthudu	Sridhar		
1984	Vasantha Geetam	Kumar		
1984	S. P. Bhayankar	Father James S.P.John Yugandhar	dual role	
1984	Justice Chakravarthy	Justice Chakravarthy Kalyan	dual role	
1984	Sangeeta Samrat	Kalyan		
1984	Bharyabhartala Bandham	Sanjeevi		
1985	Dampatyam	Dr.Satya Murthy		
1985	Illale Devata	Gopi Krishna		
1986	Aadi Dampatulu	Shankar Rao		
1986	Brahma Rudrulu	Jagadish Chandra Prasad		
1986	Guru Brahma			
1987	Collector Gari Abbai	Collector Ramakantha Rao		
1987	Agni Putrudu	Hari Hara Bhardwaja		
1987	Aatma Bandhuvulu	Anand Rao		
1988	Rao Gari Illu	Anand Rao		
1989	Rajakeeya Chadarangam	CM Satya Murthy		
1989	Bhale Dampathulu	Anand Rao		
1989	Sutradharulu	Hanumathdasu		
1990	Rao Gari Intlo Rowdy	Anand Rao		
1990	Iddaru Iddare	Justice Madhusudhan Rao		
1990	Dagudumuthala Dampathyam	Raja Sekharam		
1991	Seetharamayya Gari Manavaralu	Sitaramayya		
1992	Pranadaata	Dr.Chakravarthy		
1992	Raguluthunna Bharatham	Raghupathi		
1992	Madhavayya Gari Manavadu	Madhavayya		
1992	College Bullodu	Gopala Krishna		
1993	Rajeswari Kalyanam	Master		
1993	Ratha Saradhi	Collector Raja Shekaram		
1993	Mechanic Alludu	Jagannatham		
1994	Bangaru Kutumbam	Srinivasa Rao		
1994	Gandeevam	Chakravarthy		
1994	Theerpu	Justice Ram Mohan Rao		
1995	God Father	Raja Shekaram		
1995	Maya Bazaar	Krishna Rao		
1996	Rayudugaru Nayudugaru	Rayudu / Gudavalli Sarva Rayudu		
1998	Pandaga	Suryadevara Lakshmi Raghava Varaprasad		
1998	Sri Sita Ramula Kalyanam Chootamu Raarandi	Ramachandra Raju		
1998	Daddy Daddy	Anand Rao		
2000	Pelli Sambandham	Sitaramayya / Kaasi		
2001	Sakutumba Saparivaara Sametam	Janaki Ramayya		
2006	Chukkallo Chandrudu	Krishna Rao		
2006	Sri Ramadasu	Kabir Das		
2011	Sri Rama Rajyam	Valmiki		
2014	Manam	Chaitanya	Posthumous film	
2022	Pratibimbalu	Dr. Ravi	Posthumous film, the film was shot in 1982 dual roles	

=== Tamil films ===
Year	Film	Role(s)	Notes	Ref(s)
1951	Mayamalai	Deva Duttudu		
1951	Saudamini	Udaysena		
1951	Or Iravu	Sekhar		
1951	Maayakkari	Raghu		
1952	Kaadhal	Raja		
1953	Poongothai	Chandram		
1953	Petra Thai	Ramu		
1953	Devadas	Devdas		
1956	Mathar Kula Manikkam	Ravi		
1957	Engal Veettu Mahalakshmi	Gopu		
1957	Allavudeenum Arputha Vilakkum	Allavuddin		
1958	Chenchu Lakshmi	Vishnu		
1959	Manjal Mahimai	Chandra Shekar		
1959	Athisaya Penn	Manivannan		
1959	Kalaivaanan	Kashinath		
1959	Kalyana Parisu	Raghu		
1959	Deivame Thunai	Shankar		
1959	Vaazhkai Oppandham	Krishnan		
1960	Pattaliyin Vetri	Kannan		
1960	Engal Selvi	Raghu		
1961	Thooya Ullam	Chandra Shekar		
1961	Kaanal Neer	Surendra		
1961	Anbu Magan	Dr. Anand		
1962	Manithan Maravillai	Raja		
1973	Bharatha Vilas	Himself	Guest appearance	

=== Hindi films ===
Year	Film	Role(s)	Notes	Ref(s)
1957	Alladdin Ka Chirag	Allavuddin		
1958	Suvarna Sundari	Jayanth		

=== Television ===
Year	Serial	Role(s)	Channel	Notes	Ref(s)
2001	Matti Manishi		ETV Telugu		
