= Annapurna Studios =

Indian film studio and production company

Annapurna Studios Pvt Ltd
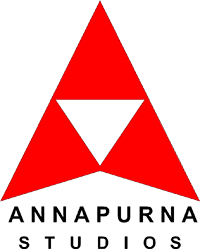
- Type: Private
- Industry: Entertainment
- Founded: 1951: Annapurna Pictures; 1976: Annapurna Studios
- Founder: Akkineni Nageswara Rao
- Headquarters: Hyderabad, India
- Key people: Akkineni Venkat; Akkineni Nagarjuna; Naga Suseela; Supriya Yarlagadda
- Products: Film; Television; Web series
- Services: Film production; Film distribution; Post-production services
- Website: Annapurna Studios

Annapurna Studios is an Indian film studio facility founded in 1976 by the Telugu actor Akkineni Nageswara Rao. It is located on a 22-acre (8.9 ha) site in Banjara Hills, Hyderabad. The studio provides comprehensive production and post-production services.

It is also a film production and distribution company, previously known as Annapurna Pictures. Registered in 1951 as Annapurna Pictures (P) Ltd., it was founded by Nageswara Rao and his mentor Dukkipati Madhusudana Rao. The first film made on the banner was Donga Ramudu (1955). It has produced over 60 feature films till date.

In 2011, Akkineni family launched a non-profitable educational institute called the Annapurna College of Film and Media. The family serves as directors on the company board.

== Annapurna Studios ==
=== Background ===
Telugu film industry was originally based in Madras (now Chennai) before the industry started moving to the capital of Andhra Pradesh (now Telangana), Hyderabad, in the late 1970s, largely due to the influence of Akkineni Nageswara Rao. Nageswara Rao was one of the first to move his film business entirely to Hyderabad, motivating others to follow suit and contributing significantly to the industry's relocation. He made it clear to the film producers that he would work in their films only if they were produced in Andhra Pradesh, except for Vauhini and Venus Studios, for which he used to work in Madras.

In 1976, the Andhra Pradesh government allocated 22 acres of land in Banjara Hills, Hyderabad to Akkineni Nageswara Rao for the purpose of building a film studio, aimed at promoting the Telugu film industry in Hyderabad. According to a Deccan Herald report, the land was secured at a nominal price of ₹7,500–8,000 per acre, totaling approximately ₹1.5–1.8 lakh for the entire plot.

=== Foundation ===
Annapurna Studios was established by Akkineni Nageswara Rao in 1976 on the 22-acre site allotted to him by the Andhra Pradesh government in Banjara Hills. It was inaugurated by the then President of India, Fakhruddin Ali Ahmed.

The first film to be made in the studio was Secretary (1976), starring Nageswara Rao and Vanisri, and produced by D. Ramanaidu. This move helped Hyderabad develop into a major centre for Telugu cinema.

=== Facilities ===
The studio mainly provides services for films, including sound stages for set construction, outdoor sets, floors, back-lots, data storage, editing, dubbing, sound effects, visual effects, digital intermediate, Dolby Vision/HDR, stereo and near field mixing, Dolby Atmos sound mixing, 5.1/7.1/9.1 sound mixing, conforming and mastering, HD/UHD/DCP mastering, and screening theatres, among other amenities.

Annapurna Studios' expansive post-production division was established in 2011, under the auspices of C. V. Rao, starting with a small NLE and audio recording facility. In 2012, Akkineni Nagarjuna unveiled five advanced, integrated production floors within the facility. These floors are touted as modern climate-controlled movie production facilities. The new ₹100 crore facility includes shooting floors alongside luxurious five-star make-up rooms, dance rehearsal spaces, a canteen, and reliable diesel generator power. These complement the existing shooting floors, which range from 10,000 to 15,000 square feet, and include outdoor filming areas and backlots.

Annapurna Studios then claimed to offer comprehensive post-production amenities, including editing, dubbing, animation, computer graphics (CG), digital interface, and sound mixing rooms. This was claimed as allowing for the entire film production process, from concept to release, to be completed within the studio. The facilities were tested during the shooting of the film Rajanna (2011).

== Annapurna Pictures ==
Annapurna Pictures
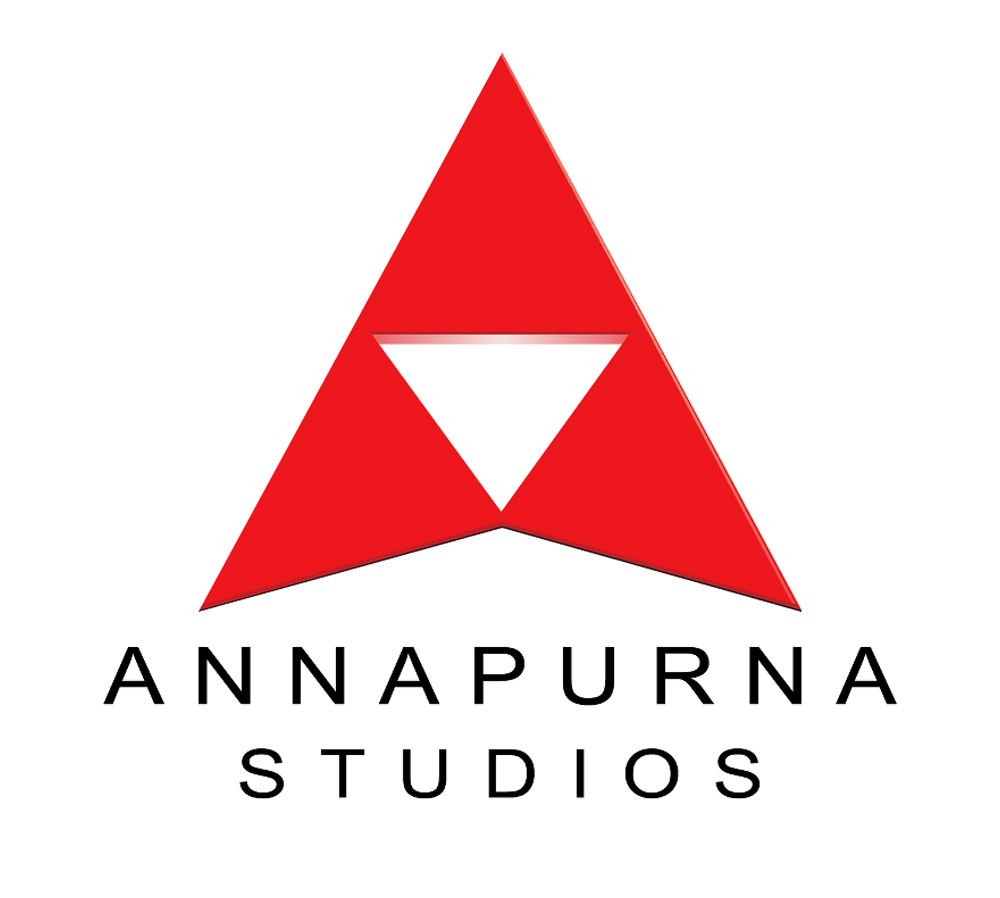
- Type: Private
- Industry: Entertainment
- Founded: 1951
- Founder: D. Madhusudhana Rao; Akkineni Nageswara Rao; Katragadda Srinivasa Rao; Koratala Prakasa Rao; T. V. A. Subbarao
- Headquarters: Madras, India
- Products: Film
- Services: Film production

By the turn of the 1950s, Akkineni Nageswara Rao was a sought-after star. His friend and mentor from his theatre days, Dukkipati Madhusudana Rao, felt it was the right time to launch their own production company. Thus was born Annapurna Pictures (P) Ltd., named after Madhusudana Rao's stepmother. Besides Madhusudana Rao and Nageswara Rao, Katragadda Srinivasa Rao, Koratala Prakasa Rao and T. V. A. Subbarao were its partners. The company was registered in 1951 with Nageswara Rao as chairman and Madhusudana Rao as Managing Director.

The first film made on the banner was Donga Ramudu (1955). The film was co-written and directed by K. V. Reddy. It starred Akkineni Nageswara Rao, Savitri, and Jamuna, with music composed by Pendyala. The film was archived in the curriculum of the Film and Television Institute of India.

Later Annapurna Pictures produced films like Thodi Kodallu (1957), Iddaru Mitrulu (1961), Chaduvukunna Ammayilu (1963), Doctor Chakravarty (1964), Aatma Gowravam (1965), and Aatmiyulu (1969). Annapurna Pictures has produced over 60 feature films till date.

== Film production ==
Year	Film	Director	Cast	Details
2026	Lenin	Murali Kishor Abburu	Akhil Akkineni; Bhagyashri Borse	Produced in association with Sithara Entertainments
2026	Dacoit: A Love Story	Shaneil Deo	Adivi Sesh; Mrunal Thakur; Anurag Kashyap	Produced in association with S. S. Creations and Suniel Narang Production
2022	Bangarraju	Kalyan Krishna	Nagarjuna Naga Chaitanya; Ramya Krishnan; Krithi Shetty	A sequel to Nagarjuna's Soggade Chinni Nayana (2016) Produced in association with Zee Studios
2021	Anubhavinchu Raja	Sreenu Gavireddy	Raj Tarun	
2021	The Baker and The Beauty	Jonathan Edwards	Santosh Sobhan	Web series with 10 episodes
2020	Loser	Abhilash Reddy	Priyadarshi Pulikonda Kalpika Ganesh Shashank Siddamsetty	Web series with 10 episodes
2019	Manmadhudu 2	Rahul Ravindran	Nagarjuna; Rakul Preet	A sequel to Nagarjuna's Manmadhudu (2002).
2018	Rangula Ratnam	Sree Ranjani	Raj Tarun; Chitra Shukla	
2017	Hello	Vikram Kumar	Akhil Akkineni; Kalyani Priyadarshan	
2017	Ra Randoi Veduka Chudham	Kalyan Krishna	Akkineni Naga Chaitanya; Rakul Preet Singh	
2016	Nirmala Convent	G. Naga Koteswara Rao	Nagarjuna; Roshan Meka; Shriya Sharma	Co-produced with Nimmagadda Prasad
2016	Soggade Chinni Nayana	Kalyan Krishna	Nagarjuna; Ramya Krishnan; Lavanya Tripathi	
2014	Oka Laila Kosam	Vijay Kumar Konda	Akkineni Naga Chaitanya; Pooja Hegde	
2014	Manam	Vikram Kumar	Akkineni Nageswara Rao; Nagarjuna; Akkineni Naga Chaitanya	First time starring three generations of heroes acting together. Got rave reviews from Critics and Audience. Won Santosham Best Film Award
2013	Uyyala Jampala	Virinchi Varma	Raj Tarun; Avika Gor	
2013	Bhai	Veerabhadram	Nagarjuna; Richa Gangopadhyay	Produced in association with Reliance Entertainment
2011	Rajanna	V. Vijayendra Prasad	Nagarjuna; Sneha	Won Nandi Award for Best Feature Film (Silver), Nandi Award for Best Child Actress (Baby Annie), Nandi Award for Best Character Actor (Gandhi), Nandi Award for Best Art Director (S Ravinder), Nandi Award for Best Female Playback Singer (Malavika), Nandi Special Jury Award (Nagarjuna)
2005	Super	Puri Jagannadh	Nagarjuna; Ayesha Takia; Sonu Sood; Anushka Shetty	Won Filmfare Best Comedian in Telugu(Ali), Nominated for Filmfare Best Film in Telugu, Filmfare Best Director (Puri Jagannadh), Filmfare Best Actor (Nagarjuna). Filmfare Best Music Director (Sandeep Chowta), Filmfare Best Actress (Ayesha Takia)
2004	Mass	Raghava Lawrence	Nagarjuna; Jyothika; Charmy Kaur	Won CineMAA Award for Best Actor (Nagarjuna), Nominated for Santosham Best Actress Award (Jyothika), Filmfare Best Actor (Nagarjuna). Filmfare Best Actress (Jyothika)
2003	Satyam	Surya Kiran	Sumanth; Genelia D'Souza	
2002	Manmadhudu	K. Vijaya Bhaskar	Nagarjuna; Sonali Bendre	Won Nandi Award for Best Feature Film (Gold)
1999	Prema Katha	Ram Gopal Varma	Sumanth; Antara Mali	Won Nandi Award for Best Feature Film (Bronze), Nandi Award for Best Director (Ram Gopal Varma), Nandi Award for Best Supporting Actress (Radhika), Nandi Award for Best Male Dubbing Artist (P.Shankar)
1996	Ninne Pelladata	Krishna Vamsi	Nagarjuna Akkineni; Tabu	Won National Film Award for Best Feature Film in Telugu
1993	Rakshana	Uppalapati Narayana Rao; R. R. Shinde	Nagarjuna Akkineni; Shobhana	
1990	Iddaru Iddare	A. Kodandarami Reddy	Akkineni Nageswara Rao; Nagarjuna Akkineni; Ramya Krishnan	
1989	Shiva	Ram Gopal Varma	Nagarjuna; Amala	Produced in association with S.S.Creations; Won Nandi Award for Best Director (Ram Gopal Varma)
1987	Agni Putrudu	K. Raghavendra Rao	Nagarjuna Akkineni; Akkineni Nageswara Rao; Sarada; Sivaji Ganesan	First film starring two generations of the Akkineni family
1986	Vikram	V. Madhusudhana Rao	Nagarjuna; Shobhana	Debut Film of Nagarjuna
1983	Sri Ranga Neethulu	A. Kodandarami Reddy	Akkineni Nageswara Rao; Sridevi	
1983	Prem Tapasya	Dasari Narayana Rao	Jeetendra; Rekha; Reena Roy	Remake of Premabhishekam
1982	Yuvaraju	Dasari Narayana Rao	Akkineni Nageswara Rao; Jayasudha; Sujatha	
1981	Prema Kanuka	K. Raghavendra Rao	Akkineni Nageswara Rao; Sridevi; Mohan Babu	
1980	Premabhishekam	Dasari Narayana Rao	Akkineni Nageswara Rao; Sridevi; Jayasudha	The film has completed 100 days in 30 centres
1980	Pilla Zamindar	Singeetam Srinivasa Rao	Akkineni Nageswara Rao; Jayasudha; Mohan Babu	
1979	Kalyani	Dasari Narayana Rao	Murali Mohan; Jayasudha	

Great India Entertainments

Year	Film	Director	Cast	Details
2000	Yuvakudu	A. Karunakaran	Sumanth; Bhumika Chawla	
1999	Seetharama Raju	Y. V. S. Chowdary	Nandamuri Harikrishna; Nagarjuna Akkineni	
1998	Aahaa	Suresh Krissna	Jagapati Babu	
1998	Chandralekha	Krishna Vamsi	Nagarjuna Akkineni; Ramya Krishna; Isha Koppikar	
1998	Sri Sita Ramula Kalyanam Chootamu Raarandi	Y. V. S. Chowdary	Akkineni Nageswara Rao; Venkat; Chandni	
1995	Sisindri	Siva Nageswara Rao	Akhil Akkineni; Nagarjuna Akkineni	

AS Combines

Year	Film	Director	Cast	Details
1990	Shiva (Hindi)	Ram Gopal Varma	Nagarjuna; Amala	

Annapurna Pictures

- 1987 America Abbayi
- 1982 Pelleedu Pillalu
- 1978 Radha Krishna
- 1977 Prema Lekhalu
- 1974 Bangaaru Kalalu
- 1972 Vichitra Bandham
- 1971 Amayakuralu
- 1970 Jai Jawan
- 1969 Aatmiyulu
- 1967 Poola Rangadu
- 1965 Aatma Gowravam
- 1964 Doctor Chakravarty
- 1963 Chaduvukunna Ammayilu
- 1961 Iddaru Mitrulu
- 1961 Velugu Needalu
- 1959 Mangalya Balam
- 1957 Thodi Kodallu
- 1955 Donga Ramudu

AA Combines

Year	Film	Director	Cast	Details
1980	Buchi Babu	Dasari Narayana Rao	Akkineni Nageswara Rao; Jaya Prada	

== Digital Intermediate ==
Year	Film	Director	Producer	Details
2025	Good Bad Ugly	Adhik Ravichandran	Mythri Movie Makers	

== Distribution ==
- 2022 Sardar - Telugu (Dubbed)
- 2023 Japan - Telugu (Dubbed)
- 2024 Premalu - Telugu (Dubbed)
- 2024 Kalki 2898 AD - Telugu
- 2026 Karuppu - Telugu (Dubbed)
- 2026 I'm Game - Telugu (Dubbed)
- 2026 Sardar 2 - Telugu (Dubbed)

== Television production ==
Television show	Genre	Channel	Telecast status	Notes
Muddha Mandaram	Drama	Zee Telugu	completed	
Pasupu Kunkuma	Drama	Zee Telugu	Completed	Nandi Television Award 2011
Pelli Pandiri	Drama	Star Maa	Completed	
Theenmar	Dance show	Zee Telugu	Completed	
Yuva	Drama	Star Maa	Completed	
Love	Drama	Star Maa	Completed	
Sasirekha Parinayam	Drama	Star Maa	Completed	Nandi Award – Audiography – M.Rakesh (2015) Nandi Award – Best Script Written – Netaje (2016) Nandi Award – Title Song – Dinakar (2016)
Puttinti Pattucheera	Drama	Star Maa	Completed	Nandi Award – First Film Director – Sri Ramoju Venkat
Savirahe	Drama	Star Maa	Completed	
Geetanjali	Drama	Zee Telugu	Completed	Nandi Award – Best Playback Singer – Pranavi (2015) Makeup Department – K. Rambabu (2015) Nandi Award – Best Leading Actress – B. Roopa (2016) Nandi Award – Best Negative Role, Male – Bramar (2016)
Punnaga	Drama	Zee Telugu	Completed	
Kathalo Rajakumari	Drama	Star Maa	Completed	
Bigg Boss 2 Telugu	Reality show	Star Maa	Completed	
Bigg Boss 3 Telugu	Reality show	Star Maa	Completed	
Bigg Boss 4 Telugu	Reality show	Star Maa	Completed	
Bigg Boss 5 Telugu	Reality show	Star Maa	Completed	
Bigg Boss Non-Stop	Reality show	Disney+ Hotstar	Completed	
Bigg Boss 6 Telugu	Reality show	Star Maa	Completed	
Amma Kosam	Drama	Gemini TV	Completed	
Ninne Pelladatha	Drama	Zee Telugu	Completed	
Kumkuma Puvvu	Drama	Star Maa	Completed	
Trinayani	Drama; Supernatural fiction	Zee Telugu	Completed	
Intti Guttu	Drama	Zee Telugu	Completed	
Malli Nindu Jabili	Drama	Star Maa	Completed	
Bigg Boss 7 Telugu	Reality show	Star Maa	Completed	
Nagapanchami	Drama; Supernatural fiction	Star Maa	Completed	

== Annapurna International School of Film and Media ==
Annapurna International School of Film and Media is the only privately managed, non-profit film and media school in India.
