= Santha (1961 film) =

- Theatrical release poster
- Directed by: Manapuram Appa Rao
- Written by: Samudrala Jr (dialogues)
- Screenplay by: Manapuram Appa Rao
- Story by: Santhikala Films Unit
- Produced by: M. R. Jayaram
- Starring: N. T. Rama Rao; Anjali Devi
- Cinematography: Kamal Ghosh
- Edited by: M. Sundaram
- Music by: Ramesh Naidu
- Production company: Santhikala Films
- Release date: 14 July 1961
- Country: India
- Language: Telugu

Santha is a 1961 Indian Telugu-language drama film, produced by M. R. Jayaram under the Santhikala Films banner and directed by Manapuram Appa Rao. It stars N. T. Rama Rao and Anjali Devi, with music composed by Ramesh Naidu.

== Cast ==
- N. T. Rama Rao as Srinivas
- Anjali Devi as Shanta
- Kanta Rao
- Relangi
- Gummadi
- Chalam as Venu
- K. V. S. Sarma
- Balakrishna
- Krishna Kumari
- Suryakantham
- Chaya Devi
- Girija as Saroja
- Surabhi Balasaraswathi

== Soundtrack ==
Santha

Film score by Ramesh Naidu
- Released: 1961
- Genre: Soundtrack
- Producer: Ramesh Naidu

Music composed by Ramesh Naidu.

S. No.	Song title	Lyrics	Singers	length
1	"Gaalikegunu"	Aarudhra	P. Susheela	
2	"Jo Jo Naa Raja"	Samudrala Jr.	P. Susheela	3:05
3	"Yelano Yenduko"	Samudrala Jr.	P. Susheela	
4	"Attu Attu"	Kosaraju	Pithapuram, Swarnalatha	3:07
5	"Naa Papaphalamo"	Samudrala Jr.	P. Susheela	
6	"Kalalalo Kavitha Latha"	Samudrala Jr.	P. B. Srinivas, S. Janaki	6:15
7	"O Paluvannela Pavurama"	Samudrala Jr.	P. B. Srinivas, S. Janaki	
