= D. Madhusudhana Rao =

Indian film producer (1917–2006)

D. Madhusudana Rao
- Born: 27 July 1917; Peyyeru, Gudivada Taluk, Krishna district, Andhra Pradesh, India
- Died: 26 March 2006 (aged 88)
- Occupations: Producer, Screen writer
- Spouse: Suseela Devi
- Children: Sitaramaswami Dukkipati Lalitha Kumari Gandhamaneni Kalyani Polavarapu Lakshmi Kanta Tummala Rama Devi Maddipoti
- Awards: National Film Awards; Nandi Awards

Dukkipati Madhusudana Rao (27 July 1917 – 26 March 2006) was an Indian film producer and screenwriter in Telugu cinema. Throughout his career, he received four National Film Awards and three Nandi Awards for his contributions to the industry. In 1993, he was honoured with the Raghupathi Venkaiah Award by the Andhra Pradesh government for his contributions to Telugu cinema.

Madhusudhana Rao co-founded Annapurna Pictures in 1951, a production house responsible for several iconic films, including Donga Ramudu (1955), Thodi Kodallu (1957), and Doctor Chakravarthy (1964). Madhusudhana Rao also played a pivotal role in shaping the career of Akkineni Nageswara Rao. His collaboration with director Adurthi Subba Rao produced some of Telugu cinema's most acclaimed works. He was also instrumental in relocating the Telugu film industry to Hyderabad and was known for his philanthropic efforts, notably as the Founder President of the Filmnagar Cooperative Housing Society. Madhusudhana Rao died on 26 March 2006, at the age of 88.

== Early life ==
Dukkipati Madhusudhana Rao was born on 27 July 1917 in Peyyeru, Gudivada Taluk of Krishna district, to Sitarama Swamy and Gangajalam. He married Suseela Devi in 1937. The couple had four daughters and a son.

== Career ==
In collaboration with Akkineni Nageswara Rao, Katragadda Srinivasa Rao, Koratala Prakash Rao, and T. V. A. Surya Rao, he established Annapoorna Pictures on 10 September 1951. The studio's inaugural production was Donga Ramudu (1955), directed by K. V. Reddy and starring Nageswara Rao and Savitri. Madhusudhana Rao produced several landmark films, including Thodi Kodallu, Iddaru Mitrulu, Chaduvukunna Ammayilu, Doctor Chakravarthy, Pula Rangadu, and Atma Gowravam. Iddaru Mitrulu is notable for being the first Telugu film to feature a double role.

Most of his films were directed by Adurthi Subba Rao, with whom he created classics like Thodi Kodallu, Mangalya Balam, Velugu Needalu, Iddaru Mitrulu, Chaduvukunna Ammayilu, Dr. Chakravarthy, Pula Rangadu, and Vichitra Bandham. He is also credited with introducing several new talents to the Telugu film industry, including Korrapati Gangadhara Rao, Yaddanapudi Sulochana Rani, Gollapudi Maruthi Rao, Ranganayakamma, K. Viswanath, Ashalatha Kulkarni, Ramakrishna, Jeedigunta Ramachandra Murthy, and Sarada.

== Awards ==
National Film Award

National Film Award for Best Feature Film in Telugu (producer)

- Thodi Kodallu (1957)
- Mangalya Balam (1958)
- Doctor Chakravarthy (1964)

Nandi Awards

- Third Best Feature Film - Bronze - Aatma Gowravam (1965)
- Second Best Feature Film - Silver - Athmeeyulu (1969)
- Third Best Feature Film - Bronze - Amaayakuraalu (1971)
- Raghupathi Venkaiah Award for lifetime achievement - 1993

== Filmography ==
As producer

- 1987 America Abbayi
- 1982 Pelleedu Pillalu
- 1978 Radha Krishna
- 1977 Prema Lekhalu
- 1974 Bangaaru Kalalu
- 1972 Vichitra Bandham
- 1971 Amayakuralu
- 1970 Jai Jawan
- 1969 Aatmiyulu
- 1967 Poola Rangadu
- 1965 Aatma Gowravam
- 1964 Doctor Chakravarty
- 1963 Chaduvukunna Ammayilu
- 1961 Iddaru Mitrulu
- 1961 Velugu Needalu
- 1961 Thooya Ullam (Tamil)
- 1959 Mangalya Balam
- 1959 Manjal Mahimai
- 1957 Todi Kodallu
- 1957 Engal Veettu Mahalakshmi (Tamil)
- 1956 Tiruttu Raman (Tamil)
- 1955 Donga Ramudu

As writer

- 1963 Chaduvukunna Ammayilu
- 1962 Man-Mauji
- 1958 Mangalya Balam
- 1957 Todi Kodallu
- 1955 Donga Ramudu

== See also ==
- Raghupathi Venkaiah Award
