= Nandi Awards of 1971 =

Indian Telugu film and TV awards ceremony

Nandi Awards were presented annually by Government of Andhra Pradesh, with the first awards being given in 1964.

The recipients of the best film awards in 1971 were:

== 1971 Nandi Awards Winners List ==
Category	Winner	Film
Best Feature Film	K. Viswanath	Chelleli Kapuram
Second Best Feature Film	K. V. Reddy	Sri Krishna Satya
Third Best Feature Film	V. Madhusudhana Rao	Amaayakuraalu
Best Documentary Film	C.D.Kishore	samsaaram
