= Vichitra Bandham =

- Theatrical release poster
- Directed by: Adurthi Subba Rao
- Written by: Acharya Aatreya (dialogues)
- Screenplay by: Adurthi Subba Rao
- Story by: Yaddanapudi Sulochana Rani
- Based on: Vijetha (novel)
- Produced by: D. Madhusudhana Rao
- Starring: Akkineni Nageswara Rao; Vanisri
- Cinematography: P. S. Selvaraj
- Edited by: M. S. Mani
- Music by: K. V. Mahadevan
- Production company: Annapurna Pictures
- Release date: 12 October 1972
- Running time: 152 mins
- Country: India
- Language: Telugu

Vichitra Bandham (transl. Strange Relation) is a 1972 Telugu-language drama film, produced by D. Madhusudhana Rao under the Annapurna Pictures banner and directed by Adurthi Subba Rao. It stars Akkineni Nageswara Rao and Vanisri, with music composed by K. V. Mahadevan. The film was based on the Yaddanapudi Sulochana Rani novel Vijetha.

== Cast ==
- Akkineni Nageswara Rao as Madhav
- Vanisri as Sandhya
- S. V. Ranga Rao as Aadi Narayana Rao
- V. Nagayya as Father Dayanidhi
- Gummadi as Ahobila Rao
- Satyanarayana as Akbar
- Allu Ramalingaiah as Chalapathi
- Padmanabham as Chitti Babu
- Raja Babu as Babji
- Bhanu Prakash as Gopal Rao
- Anjali Devi as Shanthamma
- Suryakantam as Kantham
- Rama Prabha as Bhagyam
- Radha Kumari as Kantham
- Leelarani as Jyoti
- Y. Vijaya as Lilly

== Crew ==
- Art: G. V. Subba Rao
- Choreography: Heeralal, Sundaram, Taara
- Fights: Raghavulu
- Dialogues: Acharya Aatreya
- Lyrics: Acharya Aatreya, Dasaradhi, Kosaraju
- Playback: Ghantasala, V. Ramakrishna, P. Susheela
- Music: K. V. Mahadevan
- Story: Yaddanapudi Sulochana Rani
- Editing: M. S. Mani
- Cinematography: P. S. Selvaraj
- Producer: D. Madhusudhana Rao
- Screenplay - Director: Adurthi Subba Rao
- Banner: Annapurna Pictures
- Release Date: 1972

== Soundtrack ==
Vichitra Bandham

Film score by K. V. Mahadevan
- Released: 1972
- Genre: Soundtrack
- Length: 30:21
- Producer: K. V. Mahadevan

K. V. Mahadevan chronology
| Illu Illalu (1972) | Vichitra Bandham (1972) | Koduku Kodalu (1972) |

Music composed by K. V. Mahadevan. Music released on Audio Company.

| S. No. | Song title | Lyrics | Singers | length |
|---|---|---|---|---|
| 1 | "Andamaina Jeevithamu" | Acharya Aatreya | Ghantasala, P. Susheela | 3:35 |
| 2 | "Cheekati Velugula" | Acharya Aatreya | Ghantasala, P. Susheela | 4:36 |
| 3 | "Challani Babu" | Dasaradhi | Ghantasala, P. Susheela | 3:41 |
| 4 | "Bhali Bhali Vinara" | Acharya Aatreya | Ghantasala, P. Susheela | 6:25 |
| 5 | "Vayase Oka Poolathota" | Dasaradhi | V. Ramakrishna, P. Susheela | 4:00 |
| 6 | "Chikkavu Chetilo" | Kosaraju | V. Ramakrishna | 3:57 |
| 7 | "Amma Amma Ani" | Acharya Aatreya | P. Susheela | 4:07 |

== Other ==
- VCDs and DVDs on - VOLGA Videos, Hyderabad
