= Kaza (disambiguation) =

A Kaza or qadaa is a subnational entity in the Arab world.

Kaza or KAZA may also refer to:

== Geography ==
- Kaza, Himachal Pradesh, India, a town
- Kaza, Guntur district, Andhra Pradesh, India, a village
- Kaza, Krishna district, Andhra Pradesh, India, a village
- Kavango–Zambezi Transfrontier Conservation Area, Africa

== Communications ==
- KAZA-TV, a television station in Avalon, California, United States
- KAZA (AM), a radio station in Gilroy, California, United States

== Music ==
- Kaza (rapper), French rapper
- Kaža, real name Kārlis Būmeisters, part of the Latvian musical duo Valters & Kaža

== See also ==
- Qada (disambiguation), alternative transcription of the Arabic term
- Kaja (name)
- Stephanie Kaza, an American professor
- Valters & Kaža, a Latvian musical group
- Kaaza, a village in Andhra Pradesh, India
