= Nandi Awards of 1965 =

Indian Telugu film and TV awards ceremony

The Nandi Awards were annual awards presented by the Government of Andhra Pradesh. The first awards were given in 1964. The recipients of the best film awards in 1965 were the following.

== 1965 Nandi Awards Winners List ==
Category	Winner	Film
Best Feature Film	V. Madhusudhana Rao	Antastulu
Second Best Feature Film	N. T. Rama Rao	Sri Krishna Pandaveeyam
Third Best Feature Film	K. Viswanath	Aatma Gowravam
