= Kalyani (1979 film) =

- Directed by: Dasari Narayana Rao
- Written by: Dasari Narayana Rao (screenplay / dialogues)
- Story by: Yaddanapudi Sulochana Rani
- Based on: Ragamayi (Novel)
- Produced by: Venkat Akkineni; Nagarjuna Akkineni
- Starring: Murali Mohan; Jaya Sudha
- Cinematography: K. S. Mani
- Edited by: K. Balu
- Music by: Ramesh Naidu
- Production company: Annapurna Studios
- Release date: 1979
- Running time: 139 mins
- Country: India
- Language: Telugu

Kalyani is a 1979 Telugu-language drama film directed by Dasari Narayana Rao, and produced by Venkat Akkineni and Nagarjuna Akkineni under the Annapurna Studios banner. It stars Murali Mohan, Jayasudha and music composed by Ramesh Naidu. The film is based on Yaddanapudi Sulochana Rani's novel Raagamayi.

== Cast ==
- Murali Mohan as Anand
- Jaya Sudha as Kavita
- Mohan Babu as Raja Rao
- Prabhakar Reddy as Anand's father
- Dhulipala
- Raja Babu as himself
- Allu Ramalingaiah as himself
- Mada
- K. V. Chalam
- Eeswar Rao
- Halam
- Rajasulochana as Anand's step mother
- Nirmalamma as Aajamma

== Crew ==
- Art: Bhaskar Raju
- Choreography: Saleem
- Stills: Mohanji-Jaganji
- Lyrics: C. Narayana Reddy, Veturi, Dasam Gopala Krishna
- Playback: S. P. Balasubrahmanyam, P. Susheela, S. Janaki
- Music: Ramesh Naidu
- Story: Yaddanapudi Sulochana Rani
- Editing: K. Balu
- Cinematography: K. S. Mani
- Producer: Venkat Akkineni, Nagarjuna Akkineni
- Dialogues - Screenplay - Director: Dasari Narayana Rao
- Banner: Annapurna Studios
- Release Date: 1979

== Soundtrack ==
Kalyani

Film score by Ramesh Naidu
- Released: 1979
- Genre: Soundtrack
- Length: 37:44
- Label: SEA Records
- Producer: Ramesh Naidu

Ramesh Naidu chronology
Hema Hemeelu (1979)	Kalyani (1979)	Mangala Thoranalu (1979)

Music composed by Ramesh Naidu. Music released on SEA Records Audio Company.

S. No	Song title	Lyrics	Singers	length
1	"Aakasamlo Haayaga"	Dasam Gopala Krishna	S. P. Balasubrahmanyam, P. Susheela	5:15
2	"Gubulu Puttisthavo"	Dasam Gopala Krishna	S. P. Balasubrahmanyam, P. Susheela	4:37
3	"Navaraganiki Nadakalu"	Dasam Gopala Krishna	S. P. Balasubrahmanyam, P. Susheela	5:54
4	"Nee Paluke"	Dasam Gopala Krishna	S. P. Balasubrahmanyam, P. Susheela	6:05
5	"Lalitha Kalaradhanalo"	Veturi	S. P. Balasubrahmanyam	7:33
6	"Letha Letha"	C. Narayana Reddy	S. Janaki	3:55
7	"Yedi Mosam"	C. Narayana Reddy	S. P. Balasubrahmanyam, P. Susheela	4:25
8	"Lalitha Kalaradhanalo"	Veturi	P. Susheela	
