= Iddaru Mitrulu =

Iddaru Mitrulu may refer to:

- Iddaru Mitrulu (1961 film)
- Iddaru Mitrulu (1999 film), a 1999 Tollywood film directed by K. Raghavendra Rao
