= Jai Jawan =

- Theatrical release poster
- Directed by: D. Yoganand
- Written by: D. V. Narasa Raju (dialogues)
- Screenplay by: D. Yoganand
- Story by: Yaddanapudi Sulochana Rani
- Produced by: D. Madhusudhana Rao
- Starring: Akkineni Nageswara Rao; Bharathi; Krishnam Raju
- Cinematography: P. S. Selvaraj
- Edited by: M. S. Mani
- Music by: S. Rajeswara Rao
- Production company: Annapurna Studios
- Distributed by: Navayuga Films
- Release date: 26 February 1970
- Running time: 145 mins
- Country: India
- Language: Telugu

Jai Jawan (transl. Salute to Soldier) is a 1970 Telugu-language drama film produced by D. Madhusudhana Rao under the Annapurna Studios banner and directed by D. Yoganand. It stars Akkineni Nageswara Rao, Bharati, Krishnam Raju and music composed by S. Rajeswara Rao.

== Cast ==
- Akkineni Nageswara Rao as Captain Ravindranath "Ravi"
- Bharathi as Susheela & Sujatha (Dual role)
- Krishnam Raju as Dr. Raghu Ram
- Gummadi as Madhava Rao
- Nagabhushanam as Narasimha Rao
- Allu Ramalingaiah as Venkatramaiah
- Padmanabham as Babu
- Mada as Rahim
- Bhanu Prakash as Sivaiah
- Manjula as Kasthuri
- Chandrakala as Bharathi
- Suryakantham as Sundaramma
- G. Varalakshmi as Lakshmi
- Lilly as Lilly

== Crew ==
- Art: G. V. Subba Rao
- Choreography: Tangappan
- Dialogues: D. V. Narasa Raju
- Lyrics: Dasaradhi, Sri Sri, C. Narayana Reddy, Kosaraju
- Playback: Ghantasala, P. Susheela, Pithapuram
- Music: S. Rajeswara Rao
- Story: Yaddanapudi Sulochana Rani
- Editing: M. S. Mani
- Cinematography: P. S. Selvaraj
- Producer: D. Madhusudhana Rao
- Screenplay - Director: D. Yoganand
- Banner: Annapurna Studios
- Release Date: 1970

== Soundtrack ==
Jai Jawan

Film score by S. Rajeswara Rao
- Released: 1970
- Genre: Soundtrack
- Length: 22:05
- Producer: S. Rajeswara Rao

S. Rajeswara Rao chronology
Chitti Chellelu (1970)	Jai Jawan (1970)	Desamante Manushuloi (1970)

Music composed by S. Rajeswara Rao. Music released on Audio Company.

S. No	Song title	Lyrics	Singers	length
1	"Allari Chupula Andalabala"	Dasaradhi	Ghantasala, P. Susheela	3:39
2	"Anuragapu Kovelalo"	Dasaradhi	Ghantasala, P. Susheela	3:29
3	"Chakkani Vadinaku Singarame"	C. Narayana Reddy	P. Susheela	3:33
4	"Palabuggala Chinnadanni"	C. Narayana Reddy	Ghantasala, P. Susheela	3:59
5	"Madhura Bhavala"	Dasaradhi	Ghantasala, P. Susheela	3:26
6	"Veera Bharateeya Powrulara"	Sri Sri	P. Susheela	3:59
