= Pithapuram Nageswara Rao =

Indian playback singer (1930–1996)

Pithapuram Nageswara Rao పిఠాపురం నాగేశ్వరరావు
- Born: Patharlagadda Nageswara Rao, పాతర్లగడ్డ నాగేశ్వరరావు 5 May 1930; Pithapuram, East Godavari
- Origin: Andhra Pradesh, India
- Died: 5 March 1996 (aged 65)
- Genre: Comedy
- Occupation: Playback singer
- Years active: 1950s–1970s

Patharlagadda Nageswara Rao (5 May 1930 – 5 March 1996), popularly known as Pithapuram Nageswara Rao, was an Indian playback singer known for his contributions to Telugu cinema, particularly in comedic songs. He gained popularity in the 1950s and 1960s for his unique voice and his performances alongside Madhavapeddi Satyam, with whom he formed a renowned playback singing duo. Nageswara Rao was especially recognized for singing background songs for comedians, and his work left a lasting impression on Telugu film music. He also lent his voice to a few Kannada and Tamil films.

== Early life ==
Nageswara Rao was born on 5 May 1930 in Pithapuram, East Godavari district, Andhra Pradesh. His actual surname was Patharlagadda (పాతర్లగడ్డ), but since he hailed from Pithapuram, the name became popular in usage. His father was a talented stage actor, which inspired Nageswara Rao to develop an interest in acting and singing from a young age. Initially, Nageswara Rao started by providing background vocals for those unable to sing on stage. Driven by a passion for cinema, Nageswara Rao left home and moved to Madras to pursue a career in film.

== Career ==
Nageswara Rao made his playback singing debut at the age of 16 in the film Mangala Sutram (1946). He later sang in the classic film Chandralekha (1948), produced by Gemini Studios, which helped establish him as a playback singer in the industry. Over the years, he lent his voice to several notable films, including Mantra Dandam (1951) and Paradesi (1953), where he sang for the actor Akkineni Nageswara Rao. One of his most popular songs, "Prabhu Marala Palakavela," composed by Saluri Rajeswara Rao, became a major hit and solidified his position as a busy playback singer.

In Mayabazar (1957), Pithapuram Nageswara Rao initially recorded the song "Sundari Nee Vanti Divya Swaroopamu" for Relangi's character. However, the song was later re-recorded with Ghantasala's voice, which was used in the final film.

Throughout his career, Nageswara Rao sang thousands of songs across multiple languages, including Telugu, Tamil, and Kannada. His second wave of success came through his collaboration with Madhavapeddi Satyam, where they performed numerous comedic songs together, both in films and live concerts. Some of his notable songs during this period include "Ayyayyo Jebulo Dabbulu Poyene" from Kula Gothralu (1962) and "Maa Oollo Oka Paduchundi" from Ave Kallu (1967), the latter being a duet with Ghantasala.

Pithapuram Nageswara Rao earned the affectionate title "Andhra Rafi" for his unique voice. He continued his career in films until the late 1970s, with his final song being in the 1978 film Bommarillu. As playback opportunities diminished over time, he gradually withdrew from the industry. Nageswara Rao died on 5 March 1996.

== Filmography ==
These are some of the important songs he has voiced:

Year	Film	Language	Song	Music director	Co-singer
1950	Palletoori Pilla	Telugu	Vaddura Baboi	P. Adinarayana Rao	
1950	Palletoori Pilla	Telugu	Chitapata Chinukulu	P. Adinarayana Rao	Jikki
1950	Shavukaru	Telugu			
1951	Mayakkari	Tamil	Kanbeno Kanbeno	P. Adinarayana Rao	R. Balasaraswathi Devi
1951	Mayakkari	Tamil	Kaavinil Koovum Kogilam Thaano	P. Adinarayana Rao	R. Balasaraswathi Devi
1951	Mayakkari	Tamil	Raajaa Koluvaai Vandhaar	P. Adinarayana Rao	R. Balasaraswathi Devi
1951	Mayalamari	Telugu	Ledemo Ledemo	P. Adinarayana Rao	R. Balasaraswathi Devi
1951	Mayalamari	Telugu	Koyila Koose	P. Adinarayana Rao	R. Balasaraswathi Devi
1951	Mayalamari	Telugu	Raju Vedaale	P. Adinarayana Rao	R. Balasaraswathi Devi
1951	Mayalamari	Telugu	Miyav Miyav	P. Adinarayana Rao	K. Rani
1951	Patala Bhairavi	Tamil	Naan Maaten Neeyum	Ghantasala	T. G. Saraswathi
1951	Patala Bhairavi	Telugu	Ranante Rane Ranu	Ghantasala	T. G. Saraswathi
1952	Daasi	Telugu	Jorse Chal Naa Raja	C. R. Subburaman & S. Dakshinamurthi	
1952	Daasi	Telugu	Maarajula	C. R. Subburaman & S. Dakshinamurthi	P. Leela
1952	Kaadhal	Tamil	Madhichiyathile Kudiyirukkiradhu	C. R. Subburaman	A. P. Komala
1952	Kalyanam Panni Paar	Tamil	Kalyaanam Seidhu Kaattiduvom	Ghantasala	K. Rani
1952	Kalyanam Panni Paar	Tamil	Engu Sendraayo Priyaa	Ghantasala	P. Leela & K. Rani
1952	Kalyanam Panni Paar	Tamil	Azhuvaadhe Azhuvaadhe	Ghantasala	P. Leela & Udutha Sarojini
1952	Kalyanam Panni Paar	Tamil	Maalai Soodi Kondu	Ghantasala	Ghantasala
1952	Palletooru	Telugu		Ghantasala	
1952	Pelli Chesi Choodu	Telugu	Pelli Chesi Choopisthaam	Ghantasala	
1952	Pelli Chesi Choodu	Telugu	Yekkadoyi Priya	Ghantasala	P. Leela
1952	Rajeshwari	Telugu	Ahaa Ee Lathaangi Prema	K. V. Mahadevan	
1953	Chandirani	Telugu	Swadesaniki Samajaaniki	C. R. Subburaman	A. P. Komala
1953	Paradesi	Telugu	Nenenduku Raavali	P. Adinarayana Rao	Jikki
1953	Pitchi Pullaiah	Telugu	Rarara	T. V. Raju	A. P. Komala
1954	Chandraharam	Telugu	Enchesthe Adhi Ghanakaryam	Ghantasala	
1954	Manohara	Telugu	Sandeham Ledu Sandeham Ledu	S. V. Venkatraman	S. V. Venkatraman
1954	Manohara	Telugu	Adadhanivena	S. V. Venkatraman	S. V. Venkatraman
1954	Manohara	Telugu	Rathi Manmatha	S. V. Venkatraman	S. V. Venkatraman
1954	Sangham	Telugu	Pelli Pelli	R. Sudharsanam	
1954	Todu Dongalu	Telugu		T. V. Raju	
1955	Rojulu Marayi	Telugu	Ellipotundi Elli	Master Venu	
1955	Jayasimha	Telugu	Are Ni Sa Ga Ma Pa Lokam Mosam	T. V. Raju	
1955	Jayasimha	Telugu	Nadiyeti Painadachu	T. V. Raju	
1955	Santosham	Telugu	Dhanamu Moolamura	Viswanathan–Ramamoorthy	Ghantasala
1956	Jayam Manade	Telugu	Veeragandham Pettinamaya	Ghantasala	Jikki
1956	Sri Gauri Mahatyam	Telugu	Neevakkada	Ogirala Ramachandra Rao & T. V. Raju	
1956	Sri Gauri Mahatyam	Telugu	Vallona Sikkindira	Ogirala Ramachandra Rao & T. V. Raju	Jikki
1956	Uma Sundari	Telugu	Bhale Raju Vedale	G. Aswathama	
1956	Uma Sundari	Telugu	Pooni Bandi Pooni	G. Aswathama	
1956	Uma Sundari	Telugu	Raave Raave Sinnadana	G. Aswathama	
1956	Uma Sundari	Telugu	Jeeva Thommidi	G. Aswathama	
1956	Uma Sundari	Telugu	Idhi Maya Sasaamtham	G. Aswathama	
1956	Uma Sundari	Telugu	Verri Mudiri	G. Aswathama	
1956	Uma Sundari	Telugu	Nammakuraa	G. Aswathama	Ghantasala
1957	Dongallo Dora	Telugu	Undali Undali Nuvvu Nenu	M. Subrahmanyam Raju	
1957	Kutumba Gowravam	Telugu	Anandale Nindali	Viswanathan–Ramamoorthy	P. Leela & S. Janaki
1957	Kutumba Gowravam	Telugu	Padavoi Raithanna	Viswanathan–Ramamoorthy	L. R. Eswari & Satyavathi
1957	Manamagan Thevai	Tamil	Vennilaa Jodhiyai Veesudhe	G. Ramanathan	P. Bhanumathi & Ghantasala
1957	Mayabazar	Telugu	Dayacheyandi	S. Rajeswara Rao & Ghantasala	Ghantasala, K. Rani & P. Susheela
1957	Panduranga Mahatyam	Telugu	Chebithe Vintivaa Guru Guru	T. V. Raju	Madhavapeddi Satyam
1957	Panduranga Mahatyam	Telugu	Ekkadoyi Muddula Bava Chandamama	T. V. Raju	A. P. Komala
1957	Panduranga Mahatyam	Telugu	Tholu Thitthi Idhi	T. V. Raju	Madhavapeddi Satyam
1957	Sankalpam	Telugu	Aaliki Magade Vashamayye	S. Dakshinamurthi	
1957	Sankalpam	Telugu	Thappudu Panulu	S. Dakshinamurthi	S. Dakshinamurthi
1957	Sarangadhara	Telugu		Ghantasala	
1957	Suvarna Sundari	Telugu	Eraa Manathoti Geliche Veerulevvaruraa	P. Adinarayana Rao	
1957	Varudu Kavali	Telugu	Andachandala O Jabili	G. Ramanathan	P. Bhanumathi & Ghantasala
1957	Veera Kankanam	Telugu	Hamsa Bhale Raam	S. Dakshinamurthi	
1957	Veera Kankanam	Telugu	Intikipothanu	S. Dakshinamurthi	Swarnalatha
1957	Veera Kankanam	Telugu	Annam Thinna Intike	S. Dakshinamurthi	
1957	Veguchukka	Telugu	Thempunnadi	Vedha	Ghantasala, P. B. Sreenivas & Madhavapeddi Satyam
1958	Aada Pettanam	Telugu	Om Namashivaya	Master Venu & S. Rajeswara Rao	P. Susheela
1958	Anna Thammudu	Telugu	Ayyo Paapam	G. Aswatthama	
1958	Atha Okinti Kodale	Telugu	Mayadaari Keesulaata	Pendyala Nageswara Rao	Swarnalatha
1958	Atha Okinti Kodale	Telugu	Saira Saira Thimmannaa	Pendyala Nageswara Rao	Jikki
1958	Badi Pantulu	Telugu	Neevu Nenu Jodu	T. G. Lingappa	Soolamangalam Rajalakshmi
1959	Bala Nagamma	Telugu	Appudune Thippadandi Puli Mamgoru	T. V. Raju	
1959	Bala Nagamma	Telugu	Intiloni Pooru Inthintha	T. V. Raju	
1958	Bhooloka Rambha	Telugu	Dandakaavani Seethayu	C. N. Pandurangan	Madhavapeddi Satyam, A. G. Rathnamala & K. Rani
1958	Bhooloka Rambha	Telugu	O Babu O Amma, Erragiri Vaasulam	C. N. Pandurangan	Madhavapeddi Satyam & K. Rani
1958	Bommala Pelli	Telugu	Chitti Baava	K. V. Mahadevan	Swarnalatha
1958	Bommala Pelli	Telugu	Chikkave Chinadana	K. V. Mahadevan	
1958	Inti Guttu	Telugu	Mandu Kaani Mandu	M. S. Prakash	
1958	Inti Guttu	Telugu	Manasaina Vaada	M. S. Prakash	Jikki
1958	Karthavarayuni Katha	Telugu	Kaluva Rekula	G. Ramanathan & G. Aswathama	Ghantasala, A. P. Komala & P. Leela
1958	School Master	Kannada	Naanu Neenu Jodi	T. G. Lingappa	Soolamangalam Rajalakshmi
1958	Raja Nandini	Telugu	Srigirilinga	T. V. Raju	
1959	Banda Ramudu	Telugu	Rakarakala Poolu	S, Dakshinamurthi & N. D. V. Prasada Rao	
1959	Jayabheri	Telugu	Unnaaraa Jodunnaaraa	Pendyala Nageswara Rao	P. Susheela, Ghantasala & Madhavapeddi Satyam
1959	Krishna Leelalu	Telugu		S. Dakshinamurthi	
1959	Maa Inti Mahalakshmi	Telugu	Nuvvantene Naaku Moju		
1959	Raja Malaya Simha	Telugu	Magamu Choosi	Viswanathan–Ramamoorthy	Madhavapeddi Satyam
1959	Raja Malaya Simha	Telugu	Chinnavaadaa O Vannetaadaa	Viswanathan–Ramamoorthy	L. R. Eswari
1959	Raja Malaya Simha	Telugu	Katthi Kannaa	Viswanathan–Ramamoorthy	S. Janaki
1959	Rechukka Pagatichukka	Telugu	Pantham Patti	T. V. Raju	
1959	Rechukka Pagatichukka	Telugu	Aadu Pilla	T. V. Raju	S. Janaki
1959	Rechukka Pagatichukka	Telugu	Bhala Bhale Devuda	T. V. Raju	Madhavapeddi Satyam
1959	Sabhash Ramudu	Telugu	Hello Darling Maataadavaa	Ghantasala	K. Jamuna Rani
1959	Sipayi Kuthuru	Telugu	Mokkajonna Thotalo		K. Rani
1960	Annapurna	Telugu	Rathammo Rathammo Ramani Muddula Gumma	S. Dakshinamurthi	Swarnalatha
1960	Annapurna	Telugu	Yentho Chakkani Challani Seema	S. Dakshinamurthi	K. Jamuna Rani
1960	Kadeddulu Ekaram Nela	Telugu	Yugalu Marina	C. M. Raju	
1960	Sahasra Siracheda Apoorva Chinthamani	Telugu		K. V. Mahadevan	
1960	Santhi Nivasam	Telugu	Chakkanidaana	Ghantasala	Swarnalatha
1960	Sri Venkateswara Mahatyam	Telugu	Chilako Chikkave	Pendyala Nageswara Rao	Swarnalatha
1960	Vimala	Telugu	Takkari Daana	S. M. Subbaiah Naidu	K. Jamuna Rani
1961	Intiki Deepam Illale	Telugu	Ammayigariki	Viswanathan–Ramamoorthy	L. R. Eswari
1961	Santha	Telugu	Attu Attu	Ramesh Naidu	Swarnalatha
1961	Taxi Ramudu	Telugu	Mamaiah Tirunaalaku	T. V. Raju	S. Janaki
1961	Usha Parinayam	Telugu	Ottesuko Ottesuko	S. Hanumantha Rao	K. Jamuna Rani
1961	Vagdanam	Telugu	Maa Kittaya Puttina Dinam	Pendyala Nageshwara Rao	S. Janaki & B. Vasantha
1961	Vijayanagarada Veeraputhra	Kannada	Maathina Malla	Viswanathan–Ramamoorthy	L. R. Eswari
1962	Aradhana	Telugu	Emantav Emantavoye Bava	S. Rajeswara Rao	Swarnalata
1962	Bhishma	Telugu	Namo Tyaga Charitha	S. Rajeswara Rao	
1962	Gaali Gopura	Kannada	Neene Kilaadi Hennu	T. G. Lingappa	K. Rani
1962	Gaali Medalu	Telugu	Tea Shopuloni Pilla	T. G. Lingappa	K. Rani
1962	Gulebakavali Katha	Telugu	Vinnava Tatvam Guruda	Joseph & Vijaya Krishna Murthy	
1962	Kula Gotralu	Telugu	Nee Nallani Jadalo Poolu	S. Rajeswara Rao	K. Jamuna Rani
1962	Kula Gotralu	Telugu	Ayyayyo Chethilo Dabbulo Poyane	S. Rajeswara Rao	Madhavapeddi Satyam
1962	Siri Sampadalu	Telugu	Kondammo Bangarapu Kondammo	Master Venu	S. Janaki
1962	Swarna Gowri	Kannada	Kannada Naadinaa	M. Venkataraju	
1963	Constable Koothuru	Telugu	Pudithenu Purusuduga	R. Govardhanam	L. R. Eswari
1963	Lava Kusha	Kannada	Edhakku Ee Paariyaa Kopam	Ghantasala	A. P. Komala
1963	Lava Kusha	Kannada	Vallenolli Maavaa Neena Magalani	Ghantasala	J. V. Raghavulu, Jikki & K. Rani
1963	Lava Kusha	Telugu	Yendhuke Naa Meedha Kopam	Ghantasala	A. P. Komala
1963	Nanda Deepa	Kannada	Ondu Goodide	M. Venkataraju	Jikki
1963	Savati Koduku	Telugu		C. Satyam	
1964	Dagudu Moothalu	Telugu	Divvi Divvi Divvattam	K. V. Mahadevan	Swarnalatha
1964	Desa Drohulu	Telugu	Oo Rangula Guvva	S. Rajeswara Rao	
1964	Desa Drohulu	Telugu	Chikkevule Dora	S. Rajeswara Rao	S. Janaki
1964	Kalavari Kodalu	Telugu	Nee Sogase	T. Chalapathi Rao	Madhavapeddi Satyam
1964	Manchi Manishi	Telugu	Dopidi Dopidi Dopidi	S. Rajeswara Rao & T. Chalapathi Rao	Madhavapeddi Satyam
1964	Prathigne	Telugu	Naa Ninna Mohise	S. Hanumantha Rao	K. Jamuna Rani
1964	Server Sundaram	Telugu	Parabrahma	Viswanathan–Ramamoorthy	L. R. Eswari & Madhavapeddi Satyam
1964	Sri Tirupatamma Katha	Telugu	Aadamule Natakam	Pamarthi	Jikki
1964	Sri Tirupatamma Katha	Telugu	Chilakalanchu Cheeradana	Pamarthi	Jikki
1964	Veera Sankalpa	Kannada	Haadu Baa Kogile	Rajan–Nagendra	
1965	Aada Brathuku	Telugu	Kali Muvvalu Ghallumane	Viswanathan–Ramamoorthy	L. R. Eswari
1965	Antastulu	Telugu	Aa Devudu Manishiga	K. V. Mahadevan	Madhavapeddi Satyam
1965	Naadi Aada Janme	Telugu	Kallallo Gantulu	R. Sudarsanam	P. Susheela
1965	Naadi Aada Janme	Telugu	Naa Mata Nammitivela	R. Sudarsanam	
1965	Naga Pooja	Kannada	Kannada Naadinaa	T. G. Lingappa	
1965	Prameelarjuneeyam	Telugu	Cheppandi Chuddam	Pendyala Nageswara Rao	Madhavapeddi Satyam & Swarnalata
1965	Sri Simhachala Kshetra Mahima	Telugu	Oppula Kuppa Vayyari Bhama	T. V. Raju	Swarnalata
1965	Visala Hrudayalu	Telugu	Emantunnadi Ni Hrudayam	T. V. Raju	S. Janaki
1966	Aggi Barata	Telugu	Mallelamma Mallelu	Vijaya Krishna Murthy	Ghantasala & Swarnalatha
1966	Dr. Anand	Telugu	Thaluku Beluku Cheeradhana	K. V. Mahadevan	Swarnalatha
1966	Emme Thammanna	Kannada	Kaththarisu Kaththarisu	T. G. Lingappa	
1966	Leta Manasulu	Telugu	Hello Madam Satyabhama	M. S. Viswanathan	P. B. Sreenivas
1966	Monagallaku Monagadu	Telugu	Chusanoi Neelanti	Vedha	L. R. Eswari
1966	Monagallaku Monagadu	Telugu	Kannu Chedhiri Poyinadhoi	Vedha	L. R. Eswari
1966	Palnati Yudham	Telugu		S. Rajeswara Rao	
1966	Paramanandayya Shishyula Katha	Telugu	Parama Gurudu Cheppinavadu	Ghantasala	J. V. Raghavulu, K. Chakravarthy, Bhadram & Krishna Murthy
1966	Potti Pleader	Telugu	Andamannadi Neelo Chudali	S. P. Kodandapani	S. Janaki & Madhavapeddi Satyam
1966	Rangula Ratnam	Telugu	Desa Bhaktulam Memandi	S. Rajeswara Rao & B. Gopalam	Madhavapeddi Satyam
1966	Sri Krishna Tulabharam	Telugu		Pendyala Nageswara Rao	
1966	Shakuntala	Telugu	Paathaa Kaalam Naati	Ghantasala	Madhavapeddi Satyam & J. V. Raghavulu
1966	Sri Krishna Pandaveeyam	Telugu		T. V. Raju	
1967	Anubhavichu Raja Anubhavinchu	Telugu	Madrasu Vinta Madrasu	M. S. Viswanathan	
1967	Anubhavichu Raja Anubhavinchu	Telugu	Andalucinde Jagatilo	M. S. Viswanathan	S. P. Balasubrahmanyam
1967	Ave Kallu	Telugu	Chakkani Parku Vundhi	Vedha	L. R. Eswari
1967	Ave Kallu	Telugu	Maa Oorlo Oka Paduchundhi	Vedha	Ghantasala
1967	Bhakta Prahlada	Telugu	Hiranyakashipuni Divya Charithamu	S. Rajeswara Rao	Madhavapeddi Satyam
1967	Bhakta Prahlada	Telugu	Pamulollamayya	S. Rajeswara Rao	L. R. Eswari
1967	Chakra Theertha	Kannada	Hagalu Hariyithu	T. G. Lingappa	
1967	Chakra Theertha	Kannada	O Beli Leso	T. G. Lingappa	
1967	Gopaludu Bhoopaludu	Telugu	Maradhala	S. P. Kodandapani	L. R. Eswari
1967	Kanchu Kota	Telugu	Bham Bham Bham	K. V. Mahadevan	K. Jamuna Rani
1967	Private Master	Telugu	Ekkadikellave Pilla	K. V. Mahadevan	P. Susheela
1967	Sri Krishnavataram	Telugu		T. V. Raju	
1967	Sri Sri Sri Maryada Ramanna	Telugu	Mangideelu Mangideelu	S. P. Kodandapani	P. Susheela
1967	Stree Janma	Telugu	Basandi Naditeeram	Ghantasala	L. R. Eswari
1968	Adda Dari	Kannada	Nanna Ninna Kannu Seridande	Rajan–Nagendra	
1968	Amma	Kannada	Raathriyali Malebandu	T. G. Lingappa	L. R. Eswari
1968	Baghdad Gaja Donga	Telugu	Mere Bulbul Pyaaree	T. V. Raju	L. R. Eswari
1968	Bhagya Chakramu	Telugu	Rajakumari	Pendyala Nageswara Rao	Swarnalata
1968	Bhagya Chakramu	Telugu	Manaswamy Naamam	Pendyala Nageswara Rao	Madhavapeddi Satyam
1968	Bhale Kodallu	Telugu	Nene Vachanu	M. S. Viswanathan	L. R. Eswari
1968	Bhale Kodallu	Telugu	Akkada Choosina	M. S. Viswanathan	L. R. Eswari
1968	Kalisochchina Adrishtam	Telugu	Ayyo Ayyo Thaapam	T. V. Raju	K. Jamuna Rani
1968	Kula Gowravam	Telugu	Kulam Kulam	T. G. Lingappa	L. R. Eswari
1968	Lakshmi Nivasam	Telugu	Soda Soda Andhra Soda	K. V. Mahadevan	
1968	Manchi Kutumbam	Telugu	Nera Nera Nerabandi	S. P. Kodandapani	
1968	Niluvu Dopidi	Telugu	Nee Bandaram Paina Pataaram	K. V. Mahadevan	L. R. Eswari
1968	Niluvu Dopidi	Telugu	Nene Dhanalakshmini	K. V. Mahadevan	Ghantasala & L. R. Eswari
1968	Nindu Samsaram	Telugu	Joru Joruga Saanu	Master Venu	
1968	Nindu Samsaram	Telugu	My Dear Thulasammakka	Master Venu	
1968	Ramu	Telugu	Thaaraa Shashaankam	R. Goverdhanam	Madhavapeddi Satyam, L. R. Eswari & R. Tilakam
1968	Thalli Prema	Telugu	Hello Hello Doragaru	R. Sudarsanam	L. R. Eswari
1968	Thalli Prema	Telugu	Veedhi Natakam	R. Sudarsanam	L. R. Eswari
1969	Aatmiyulu	Telugu	Empillo Tattara Bittaragunnavu	S. Rajeswara Rao	
1969	Bhale Mastaru	Telugu	Ye Daari Godari	T. V. Raju	L. R. Eswari
1969	Bhale Rangadu	Telugu	Abbabba Chali	K. V. Mahadevan	L. R. Eswari
1969	Buddhimantudu	Telugu	Allari Pedataru Pilla Allari Pedatare	K. V. Mahadevan	Swarnalata
1969	Gandikota Rahasyam	Telugu	Thagulukunte	T. V. Raju	L. R. Eswari
1969	Mooga Nomu	Telugu	Gonthu Vippi	R. Govardhanam	P. Susheela
1969	Kathanayakudu	Telugu	Ravela Dayaleda Baala Intiki Raaraada	T. V. Raju	Madhavapeddi Satyam
1969	Mathru Devata	Telugu	Ninnu Chuchithe	K. V. Mahadevan	Swarnalatha
1969	Natakala Rayudu	Telugu	Rayuda Na Rayuda Natakala Rayuda	G. K. Venkatesh	
1969	Natakala Rayudu	Telugu	Pattu Panpuna fVennela	G. K. Venkatesh	P. Susheela
1969	Natakala Rayudu	Telugu	Rathamu Siddhamu Nee	G. K. Venkatesh	P. Susheela
1969	Nindu Hrudayalu	Telugu		T. V. Raju	
1969	Varakatnam	Telugu	Gilakala Mancham Undi	T. V. Raju	K. Jamuna Rani
1969	Varakatnam	Telugu	Malle Poola Panditlona	T. V. Raju	K. Jamuna Rani
1969	Vichitra Kutumbam	Telugu	Erra Erranidana Burra Buggaladana	T. V. Raju	L. R. Eswari
1970	Chitti Chellelu	Telugu		S. Rajeswara Rao	
1970	Jai Jawan	Telugu		S. Rajeswara Rao	
1970	Kodalu Diddina Kapuram	Telugu	Om Sachidaananda Ee Sarvam Govinda	T. V. Raju	Madhavapeddi Satyam
1970	Mayani Mamata	Telugu	Oo Orori Chinnoda	G. Aswattama	L. R. Eswari
1970	Sambarala Rambabu	Telugu	Vinnaaraa Vinnaaraa	V. Kumar	P. Leela, K. Swarna, Madhavapeddi Satyam, K. Jamuna Rani & J. V. Raghavulu
1970	Sri Krishnadevaraya	Kannada	Baa Veera Kannadiga	T. G. Lingappa	
1971	Amaayakuraalu	Telugu	Chilakalanti Chinadana	S. Rajeswara Rao	B. Vasantha
1971	Dasara Bullodu	Telugu	O Mallayyagaari	K. V. Mahadevan	Ghantasala
1971	Iddaru Ammayilu	Telugu	Eppudu Eppudu	K. V. Mahadevan	P. Susheela
1971	Kula Gourava	Kannada	Naavikanaaro	T. G. Lingappa	
1971	Manasu Mangalyam	Telugu	Elaa Unnadhi	Pendyala Nageswara Rao	Swarnalata
1971	Mattilo Manikyam	Telugu	Vasthe Istha Naa	C. Satyam	L. R. Eswari
1971	Neerum Neruppum	Tamil	Virundho Nalla Virundhu	M. S. Viswanathan	K. Veeramani, Pattom Sadan, L. R. Eswari, T. A. Mothi & J. V. Raghavalu
1971	Pavitra Bandham	Telugu	Tantrala Bavayya	S. Rajeswara Rao	Swarnalatha
1971	Raitu Bidda	Telugu		S. Hanumantha Rao	
1971	Sri Krishna Vijayamu	Telugu		Pendyala Nageswara Rao	
1972	Sri Krishnanjaneya Yuddham	Telugu	Gopala Krishna Jayaho Balarama	T. V. Raju	P. Leela
1972	Sri Krishna Satya	Telugu	Kotukotandira	Pendyala Nageswara Rao	
1973	Dabbuki Lokam Dasoham	Telugu	Chepalani Vunadi	K. V. Mahadevan	L. R. Eswari
1973	Dabbuki Lokam Dasoham	Telugu	Dabbuku Lokam Daasoham	K. V. Mahadevan	Madhavapeddi Satyam, Mohan Raju, P. Benerjee
1974	Ammayi Pelli	Telugu	Gudu Gudu Chedugudu	P. Bhanumathi & C. Satyam	Madhavapeddi Satyam
1974	Bangaaru Kalalu	Telugu	Taanagandira	S. Rajeswara Rao	Madhavapeddi Satyam
1975	Balipeetam	Telugu	Yesukundam Buddoda Yesukundamu	K. Chakravarthy	Madhavapeddi Satyam
1976	Mahakavi Kshetrayya	Telugu	Sri Manmahodeva	P. Adinarayana Rao	P. Susheela & Anand
1978	Bommarillu	Telugu	Challani Ramayya Chakkani Seetamma		
1991	Rowdy Gaari Pellam	Telugu	Aakundaa Vakkistaa	Bappi Lahiri	K. Jamuna Rani
