= Aatmiyulu =

- Movie Poster
- Directed by: V. Madhusudhana Rao
- Written by: Pinisetty Srirama Murthy (dialogues)
- Screenplay by: D. Madhusudhana Rao
- Story by: Yaddanapudi Sulochana Rani
- Produced by: D. Madhusudhana Rao
- Starring: Akkineni Nageswara Rao; Vanisree
- Cinematography: P. S. Selvaraj
- Edited by: M. S. Mani
- Music by: S. Rajeswara Rao
- Production company: Saradhi Studios
- Distributed by: Navayuga Films
- Release date: 17 July 1969
- Running time: 173 mins
- Country: India
- Language: Telugu

Aatmiyulu (transl. Beloved) is a 1969 Indian Telugu-language drama film, produced by D. Madhusudhana Rao under the Saradhi Studios banner and directed by V. Madhusudhana Rao. It stars Akkineni Nageswara Rao and Vanisree, with music composed by S. Rajeswara Rao. The film was remade in Tamil as Pennin Vaazhkai (1981).

== Cast ==
- Akkineni Nageshwara Rao as Suryam
- Vanisree as Jaya
- Chandra Mohan as Chandram
- Gummadi as Jagannadham
- Nagabhushanam as Justice Rajaram
- Padmanabham as Chittibabu
- Dhulipala as Veerayya
- Prabhakar Reddy as Sadanandam
- Bhanu Prakash as Chidambaram
- Pisupati Venkateswara Rao as Srinivasaiah, Hotel Owner
- Chandrakala as Seetha
- Vijaya Nirmala as Saroja
- Suryakantham as Mahankali
- Radha Kumari as Nancharamma
- Rukmini as Parvathi

== Soundtrack ==
Aatmiyulu

Film score by S. Rajeswara Rao
- Released: 1969
- Genre: Soundtrack
- Length: 32:23
- Producer: S. Rajeswara Rao

S. Rajeswara Rao chronology
Aadarsa Kutumbam (1969)	Aatmiyulu (1969)	Jai Jawan (1970)

Music composed by S. Rajeswara Rao.

S. No.	Song title	Lyrics	Singers	length
1	"Annayya Kalale Pandenu"	C. Narayana Reddy	Ghantasala, P. Susheela	3:13
2	"Kallalo Pelli Pandiri"	Sri Sri	Ghantasala, P. Susheela	3:41
3	"Madilo Veenalu Mroge"	Dasaradhi	P. Susheela	3:13
4	"Ammababu Nammaradu"	Kosaraju	Ghantasala, P. Susheela	4:08
5	"Chilipi Navvula"	Dasarathi	S. P. Balasubrahmanyam, P. Susheela	3:49
6	"Eerojullo Paduchuvaru Gadusuvaru"	C. Narayana Reddy	Ghantasala, P. Susheela	4:13
7	"Swagatam Oho Chilipi"	Aarudhra	P. Susheela	3:15
8	"O Chamanti Emite"	C. Narayana Reddy	Ghantasala, P. Susheela	3:46
9	"Empillo Tattara"	Kosaraju	Pithapuram	3:05

== Accolades ==
- Nandi Award for Second Best Feature Film - Silver won by D. Madhusudhana Rao under production of Saradhi Studios(1969)
