= Manasu Mangalyam =

- Theatrical release poster
- Directed by: K. Pratyagatma
- Written by: Acharya Aatreya (dialogues)
- Screenplay by: K. Pratyagatma
- Story by: K. Srinivasa Rao
- Produced by: Koganti Kutumba Rao
- Starring: Akkineni Nageswara Rao; Jamuna
- Cinematography: K. S. Rama Krishna Rao
- Edited by: P. Srihari Rao
- Music by: Pendyala Nageswara Rao
- Production company: Uttama Chitra
- Release date: 28 January 1971
- Running time: 143 minutes
- Country: India
- Language: Telugu

Manasu Mangalyam (transl. Heart & Wedding Chain) is a 1971 Telugu-language drama film, produced by Koganti Kutumba Rao under the Uttama Chitra banner and directed by K. Pratyagatma. It stars Akkineni Nageswara Rao, Jamuna, Ramakrishna and features music composed by Pendyala Nageswara Rao.

== Cast ==
- Akkineni Nageswara Rao as Ravi
- Jamuna as Manjula
- Ramakrishna as Shekhar
- Jaggayya as Murthy
- V. Nagayya as Purushotham
- Ramana Reddy as Perumallaiah
- Padmanabham as Kavi Kula Shekharam
- Chandra Mohan as Madhu
- Anjali Devi as Mumtaz
- Suryakantham as Andallu
- Geetanjali as Geetha
- Anitha as Sarala
- Manimala as Amrutha
- Jhansi as Suramma

== Crew ==
- Art: G. V. Subba Rao
- Choreography: Tangappa, Chinni, Sampath
- Dialogues: Acharya Aatreya
- Lyrics: Acharya Aatreya, Dasaradhi, Appalachary
- Playback: Ghantasala, P. Susheela, S. Janaki, S. P. Balasubrahmanyam, Pithapuram, Swarnalata
- Music: Pendyala Nageswara Rao
- Story: K. Srinivasa Rao
- Editing: P. Srihari Rao
- Cinematography: K. S. Rama Krishna Rao
- Producer: Koganti Kutumba Rao
- Screenplay - Director: K. Pratyagatma
- Banner: Uttama Chitra
- Release Date: 28 January 1971

== Soundtrack ==
Manasu Mangalyam

Film score by Pendyala Nageswara Rao
- Released: 1970
- Genre: Soundtrack
- Length: 28:12
- Producer: Pendyala Nageswara Rao

Music composed by Pendyala Nageswara Rao.

S. No.	Song title	Lyrics	Singers	length
1	"Aavesham Ravali"	Acharya Aatreya	Ghantasala	3:47
2	"Ee Musugu Theeyaku"	Dasaradhi	P. Susheela	4:16
3	"Elaa Unnadhi"	Appalachary	Pithapuram, Swarnalata	3:44
4	"Endhuku Vachaavo"	Acharya Aatreya	Ghantasala	3:56
5	"Ninnu Nenu Chusthunna"	Dasaradhi	Ghantasala	4:28
6	"Po Po Entha Dooram"	Acharya Aatreya	S. P. Balasubrahmanyam, S. Janaki	3:33
6	"Ye Shubha Samayamlo"	Dasaradhi	Ghantasala, P. Susheela	4:28
