= Chaduvukunna Ammayilu =

- Theatrical release poster
- Directed by: Adurthi Subba Rao
- Written by: Tripuraneni Gopichand (dialogues)
- Screenplay by: D. Madhusudhana Rao; Adurthi Subba Rao; K. Viswanath
- Story by: Dr. Sridevi
- Based on: Kaalaatheetha[[:te:కాలాతీత వ్యక్తులు]] Vyakthulu (novel)
- Produced by: D. Madhusudhana Rao
- Starring: Akkineni Nageswara Rao; Savitri; Krishna Kumari
- Cinematography: P. S. Selvaraj
- Edited by: T. Krishna
- Music by: S. Rajeswara Rao
- Production company: Annapurna Pictures
- Distributed by: Navayuga Films
- Release date: 10 April 1963
- Running time: 163 mins
- Country: India
- Language: Telugu

Chaduvukunna Ammayilu (transl. Educated Girls) is a 1963 Indian Telugu-language drama film directed by Adurthi Subba Rao. It stars Akkineni Nageswara Rao, Savitri, Krishna Kumari with music composed by S. Rajeswara Rao. It was produced by D. Madhusudhana Rao under the Annapurna Pictures banner. The film is based on the Telugu novel Kaalaatheetha Vyakthulu, written by Dr. Sridevi. The film was recorded as a Super Hit at the box office.

== Cast ==
- Akkineni Nageshwara Rao as Sekhar
- Savitri as Sujatha
- Krishna Kumari as Vasantha
- Gummadi as Venkata Rangayya
- Relangi as Bramhanandayya
- Padmanabham as Anand
- Sobhan Babu as Prabhakar
- Allu Ramalingaiah as Bank Agent
- Vinnakota Ramanna Panthulu as Raghunath Rao.
- Suryakantham as Vardhanamma
- Hemalatha as Mahalakshmamma
- E. V. Saroja as Latha

== Crew ==
- Art: G. V. Subba Rao
- Choreography: Pasumarti
- Dialogues: Tripuraneni Gopichand
- Playback: Ghantasala, P. Susheela, P. B. Srinivas, Madhavapeddi Satyam, Swarnalatha, Ashalatha Kulkarni
- Lyrics: C. Narayana Reddy, Dasaradhi, Arudra, Kosaraju
- Associate Director: K. Viswanath
- Story: Dr. Sridevi
- Screenplay: D. Madhusudhana Rao, Adurthi Subba Rao, K. Viswanath
- Music: S. Rajeswara Rao
- Editor: T. Krishna
- Cinematography: P. S. Selvaraj
- Producer: D. Madhusudhana Rao
- Director: Adurthi Subba Rao
- Banner: Annapurna Pictures
- Release Date: 10 April 1963

== Music ==
Chaduvukunna Ammayilu

Film score by S. Rajeswara Rao
- Released: 1963
- Genre: Soundtrack
- Length: 26:48
- Producer: S. Rajeswara Rao

Music was composed by S. Rajeswara Rao.

S. No.	Song title	Lyrics	Singers	length
1	"Okate Hridayam Kosamu"	Dasaradhi	Ghantasala, P. Susheela	3:23
2	"Kila Kila Navvula"	C. Narayana Reddy	Ghantasala, P. Susheela	3:00
3	"Emandoy Nidura Levandoy"	Dasaradhi	Ashalatha Kulkarni	3:16
4	"Adavaalla Kopamlo"	Arudra	Ghantasala, P. Susheela	3:21
5	"Neeko Todu Kavali"	Arudra	Ghantasala, P. Susheela	3:47
6	"Oho Chakkani Chinnadi"	Arudra	P. B. Srinivas, Ashalatha Kulkarni	3:27
7	"Emitee Avataram"	Kosaraju	Madhavapeddi Satyam, Swarnalatha	3:20
8	"Vinipinchani Raagale"	Dasaradhi	Ghantasala, P.Susheela	3:14

== Release & Reception ==
Chaduvukunna Ammayilu was released on 10 April 1963. Despite facing competition from Lava Kusa, the film ran for 100 days in theatres.
