= Agni Poolu (film) =

- Theatrical release poster
- Directed by: K. Bapayya
- Based on: Agni Poolu by Yaddanapudi Sulochana Rani
- Produced by: D. Ramanaidu
- Starring: Krishnam Raju; Jayasudha; Jaya Prada
- Cinematography: A. Venkat
- Edited by: K. A. Marthand
- Music by: K. V. Mahadevan
- Production company: Suresh Productions
- Release date: 12 March 1981
- Country: India
- Language: Telugu

Agni Poolu (transl. Butea) is a 1981 Indian Telugu-language drama film directed by K. Bapayya and produced by D. Ramanaidu. The film stars Krishnam Raju, Jayasudha, Jaya Prada, Jayanthi, Sarath Babu, Sudhakar and Kaikala Satyanarayana. It was based on Yaddanapudi Sulochana Rani's 1971 novel of the same name.

== Cast ==
- Krishnam Raju as Virupaksha Raja & Krishna Chaitanya (Dual role)
- Jayasudha as Janaki "Jany"
- Jaya Prada as Rukmini
- Jayanthi as Rajeshwari
- Satyanayana as Vishwam
- Gummadi as Rajeshwari's father
- Nirmalamma as Annapurna
- Sreedhar as Prasad
- Sarath Babu as Rahul
- Sudhakar as Bobby Shivam
- Sumalatha as Bhavani "Beena"
- Subhashini as Neeli
- R. Narayana Murthy as Raju
- Baby Anju
- Allu Rama Lingaiah

== Soundtrack ==
No.	Title	Singer(s)	Length
1.	"Abbai Abbai Nuvventha"	S. P. Balasubrahmanyam, P. Susheela
2.	"Priyudaa Paraaka"	S. P. Balasubrahmanyam, P. Susheela
3.	"Vayasu Kothi Vantidi"	S. P. Balasubrahmanyam, P. Susheela
4.	"Idi Whisky-Adi Brandy"	S. P. Balasubrahmanyam, P. Susheela
