= Bangaaru Kalalu =

Bangaru Kalalu
- Theatrical release poster
- Directed by: Adurthi Subba Rao
- Written by: Madhukuri Johnson; Gopi (dialogues)
- Screenplay by: Adurthi Subba Rao
- Story by: Yaddanapudi Sulochana Rani
- Based on: Bangaru Kalalu (novel)
- Produced by: D. Madhusudhana Rao
- Starring: Akkineni Nageswara Rao; Waheeda Rehman; Lakshmi
- Cinematography: P. S. Selvaraj
- Edited by: M. S. Mani
- Music by: S. Rajeswara Rao
- Production company: Annapurna Pictures
- Release date: 4 June 1974
- Running time: 158 mins
- Country: India
- Language: Telugu

Bangaaru Kalalu (transl. Golden Dreams) is a 1974 Telugu-language drama film, produced by D. Madhusudhana Rao under Annapurna Pictures banner and directed by Adurthi Subba Rao. It stars Akkineni Nageswara Rao, Waheeda Rehman, Lakshmi and music composed by S. Rajeswara Rao. The film was based on Yaddanapudi Sulochana Rani's novel of the same name.

== Cast ==
- Akkineni Nageswara Rao as Ravi
- Waheeda Rehman as Saroja
- Lakshmi as Jyothi
- S. V. Ranga Rao as Purushotham
- Kanta Rao as Raja Rao
- Satyanarayana as Seshagiri
- Raja Babu as Venu
- Allu Ramalingaiah as Chidambaram
- Giri Babu as Dr.Prasad
- Bhanu Prakash
- Chitti Babu as Narasimham
- Suryakantam as Jamuna Bai
- Mamatha as Radha
- Meena Kumari
- Pushpalata
- Sumathi Koushil
- Baby Anuradha as Uma

== Crew ==
- Art: G. V. Subba Rao
- Choreography: Heeralal, Sundaram
- Dialogues: Madhukuri Johnson, Gopi
- Lyrics: Acharya Aatreya, Kosaraju, Dasaradhi
- Playback: Ghantasala, P. Susheela, V. Ramakrishna, Pithapuram, Madhavapeddi Satyam, Raghuram
- Music: S. Rajeswara Rao
- Story: Yaddanapudi Sulochana Rani
- Editing: M. S. Mani
- Cinematography: P. S. Selvaraj
- Producer: D. Madhusudhana Rao
- Screenplay - Director: Adurthi Subba Rao
- Banner: Annapurna Pictures
- Release Date: 4 June 1974

== Soundtrack ==
Bangaaru Kalalu

Film score by S. Rajeswara Rao
- Released: 1974
- Genre: Soundtrack
- Length: 27:37
- Producer: S. Rajeswara Rao

S. Rajeswara Rao chronology
Tatamma Kala (1974)	Bangaaru Kalalu (1974)	Jeevitha Rangam (1974)

Music composed by S. Rajeswara Rao. Music released on Audio Company.

S. No.	Song title	Lyrics	Singers	length
1	"Chekkili Meeda"	Dasaradhi	V. Ramakrishna, P. Susheela	4:20
2	"Nee Kannulalo"	Dasaradhi	V. Ramakrishna, P. Susheela	3:59
3	"Singaram Chindulu Vese"	Kosaraju	P. Susheela	4:42
4	"Puttina Roju Jejelu"	Dasaradhi	P. Susheela	3:35
5	"Manchthananiki Taave Ledu"	Acharya Aatreya	Ghantasala	4:26
6	"Naalona Valapundi"	Dasaradhi	P. Susheela	3:11
7	"Thanagandira"	Kosaraju	Pithapuram, Madhavapeddi Satyam, D. Raghuram	3:24
