= Qada =

Qada may refer to:

- Qada (Islamic term), judgement or fulfillment of neglected duties
- Qadan culture of Northeastern Africa (15,000 BCE to 11,000 BCE)
- The Arabic form of the Turkish administrative division Kaza

== See also ==
- Kaza (disambiguation)
