= Aatma Gowravam =

- Theatrical release poster
- Telugu: ఆత్మ గౌరవం
- Directed by: K. Viswanath
- Written by: Gollapudi Maruthi Rao; Bhamidipati Radhakrishna (dialogues)
- Screenplay by: K. Viswanath
- Based on: Aathma Gouravam by Yaddanapudi Sulochana Rani
- Produced by: D. Madhusudhana Rao
- Starring: Akkineni Nageswara Rao; Kanchana; Rajasree
- Cinematography: P. S. Selvaraj
- Edited by: M. S. Mani
- Music by: S. Rajeswara Rao
- Production company: Annapurna Pictures (now Annapurna Studios)
- Distributed by: Navayuga Films
- Release date: 1966
- Running time: 170 mins
- Country: India
- Language: Telugu

Aatma Gowravam (transl. Self-esteem) is a 1966 Indian Telugu-language drama film directed by K. Viswanath. It stars Akkineni Nageswara Rao, Kanchana, Rajasree, and music composed by S. Rajeswara Rao. It is produced by D. Madhusudhana Rao under Annapurna Pictures banner.

The film is the directorial debut of K. Viswanath. It is based on the novel of same name by Yaddanapudi Sulochana Rani, and won two Nandi Awards. The film was screened at the Asian and African film Festival at Tashkent.

== Plot ==
However, Geeta misinterprets Vasu's friendship with her as love and gets her hopes up.

When the Zamindar family manager Appalacharyulu relays the news to Santana Lakshmi, she threatens him to not tell Vasu about it. Vasu's absence further disappoints Ramaiah. After a while, Ramaiah proceeds to Zamindar to propose the marriage of Vasu & Savitri, but is scorned by Santana Lakshmi while Zamindar claims that Vasu is old enough to choose his wife.

When Vasu learns of the happenings at his brother's house from Appalacharyulu, he rushes to the village. Vasu returns home and blasts Zamindar and Santana Lakshmi for cutting off his ties with his family and concealing the tearful news.

Geeta comes across Savitri and shelters her as an orphan. Destiny brings her nearer to Vasu, and they fall in love incognito. Savitri realizes that Vasu is her uncle while Vasu is unaware. When Geeta sees Vasu & Savitri's romance, she is distressed and makes allegations. However, Savitri divulges the reality to Geeta and Geeta unites them, unveiling Savitri's true identity. After much drama, Vasu, Savitri, Geeta, & Venu use their own plays to make elders admit their mistakes, including Santana Lakshmi. Finally, the movie ends happily with the marriage of Vasu & Savitri.

== Cast ==
- Akkineni Nageswara Rao as Srinivasa Rao
- Kanchana as Savitri / Sarala
- Rajasree as Geeta Devi
- Gummadi as Ramayya
- Relangi as Zamindar Varahala Rao
- Ramana Reddy as Bhajagovindam
- Chalam as Venu
- Allu Ramalingaiah as Appalacharyulu
- Suryakantham as Santana Lakshmi
- Vasanthi as Parvathi
- Hemalatha as Santhamma
- Pushpa Kumari as Janaki
- Giribabu as Raj

== Music ==
Aatma Gowravam

Film score by S. Rajeswara Rao
- Released: 1966
- Genre: Soundtrack
- Length: 36:34
- Label: His Master's Voice
- Producer: S. Rajeswara Rao

Music was composed by S. Rajeswara Rao. Music released on His Master's Voice

S. No.	Song title	Lyrics	Singers	Length
1	"Preminichi Pellichesuko"	Aarudhra	Ghantasala	3:30
2	"Maaraajulochchaaru"	C. Narayana Reddy	P. Susheela, Vasantha	3:14
3	"Preminchanide Pellaadanani"	Arudra	Ghantasala, P. Susheela	3:37
4	"Paruvam Ponge Velalo"	C. Narayana Reddy	Ghantasala, P. Susheela	4:04
5	"Mundativale Naapai"	Dasaradhi	P.Susheela	4:55
6	"Andenu Nede Andani"	Dasaradhi	P. Susheela	3:31
7	"Oka Poolabaanam"	Dasaradhi	Ghantasala, P. Susheela	3:41
8	"Bratuku Netito Baruvai"	Arudra	P. Susheela	3:30
9	"Raanani Raalenani"	Arudra	Ghantasala	3:23
10	"Valapulu Virisina"	Sri Sri	Ghantasala, P. Susheela	3:09

== Accolades ==
Nandi Awards - 1966

- Third Best Feature Film – Bronze – D. Madhusudhana Rao
- Best Story Writer – Gollapudi Maruthi Rao and Yaddanapudi Sulochana Rani

== Reception ==
Sport and Pastime gave a positive review citing "It has all the elements – a heart-warming story, good acting, pleasing music and conventional cliches – that appeal to the average moviegoer".
