= Kaza, Krishna district =

Kaza
- Village
- Interactive map of Kaza
- Location in Andhra Pradesh, India
- Coordinates: 16.20°N 81.01°E
- Country: India
- State: Andhra Pradesh
- District: Krishna

Area
  - Total: 24.84 km^{2} (9.59 sq mi)

Population (2011)
  - Total: 7,687
  - Density: 309.5/km^{2} (801.5/sq mi)

Languages
  - Official: Telugu
- Time zone: UTC+5:30 (IST)
- PIN: 521150
- Telephone code: 08671
- Vehicle registration: AP 16
- Lok Sabha constituency: Machilipatnam
- Vidhan Sabha constituency: Pamarru

Kaza is a village in Krishna district of the Indian state of Andhra Pradesh. It is located in Movva mandal of Machilipatnam revenue division. It is one of the villages in the mandal to be a part of Andhra Pradesh Capital Region. The village is also known for producing hand-woven cotton, silk and khadhi garments by using looms. The village also holds agriculture as a major livelihood. Famous Novelist Yaddanapudi Sulochana Rani was born here.

== See also ==
- Villages in Movva mandal
