= Doctor Chakravarty =

Doctor Chakravarthy
- Theatrical release poster
- Directed by: Adurthi Subba Rao
- Written by: Acharya Aatreya; Gollapudi Maruti Rao (dialogues)
- Screenplay by: Adurthi Subba Rao
- Based on: Chakrabharmanam by Koduri Kousalya Devi
- Produced by: D. Madhusudhana Rao
- Starring: Akkineni Nageswara Rao; Savitri; Jaggayya
- Cinematography: P. S. Selvaraj
- Edited by: T. Krishna
- Music by: S. Rajeswara Rao
- Production company: Annapurna Pictures
- Release date: 10 July 1964
- Running time: 167 minutes
- Country: India
- Language: Telugu

Doctor Chakravarthy is a 1964 Indian Telugu-language drama film, produced by D. Madhusudhana Rao and directed by Adurthi Subba Rao. It stars Akkineni Nageswara Rao, Savitri and Jaggayya, with music composed by S. Rajeswara Rao. The film is based on Koduri Kousalya Devi's novel Chakrabhramanam. It is the first film to win the Nandi Award, instituted by Government of Andhra Pradesh in 1964. It inspired many people in India to become doctors. The film was remade in Malayalam as Vilakkapetta Bendhangal.

== Cast ==
- Akkineni Nageswara Rao as Dr. Chakravarthy
- Savitri as Madhavi
- Jaggayya as Ravindra
- Krishna Kumari as Dr. Sridevi
- Gummadi as DSP Sridhar
- Padmanabham as Venkata Swamy
- Chalam as Venkata Ramana
- Sanjameswara Rao as Jagannatha Rao
- Murali Krishna as Shekar
- Sowcar Janaki as Nirmala
- Suryakantham as Suryakanthamma
- Geetanjali as Sudha
- Jayanthi as Padma

== Soundtrack ==
The music was composed by S. Rajeswara Rao.

Song title	Lyrics	Singers	length
"Manasuna Manasai"	Sri Sri	Ghantasala	3:47
"Ee Mounam Ee Bidiyam"	Aarudhra	Ghantasala, P. Susheela	3:22
"Neevuleka Veena"	Acharya Aatreya	P. Susheela	3:28
"Padamani Nannadagavalena"	Aarudhra	P. Susheela	3:45
"Nijam Cheppave Pilla"	Aarudhra	P. Susheela, B. Vasantha	4:10
"Padamani Nannadaga Thaguna"	Aarudhra	P. Susheela	3:30
"Neevuleka Veena" (Pathos)	Acharya Aatreya	P. Susheela	1:09
"O Ungarala Mungurula Raja"	Aarudhra	Madhavapeddi Satyam, P. Susheela	4:32
"Ontiga Samayam Chikkindhi"	Kosaraju	S. Janaki, P. B. Sreenivas	3:24
"Evaro Jwalanu Ragilincharu"	Acharya Aatreya	Ghantasala	3:40

== Awards ==
- National Film Award for Best Feature Film in Telugu - 1964
- Nandi Award for Best Feature Film - Gold - 1964
