= Amaayakuraalu =

Amayakuralu
- Theatrical release poster
- Directed by: V. Madhusudhana Rao
- Written by: Pinisetty Srirama Murthy (story / dialogues)
- Screenplay by: V. Madhusudhana Rao
- Produced by: D. Madhusudhana Rao
- Starring: Akkineni Nageswara Rao; Kanchana; Sharada
- Cinematography: P. S. Selvaraj
- Edited by: M. S. Mani
- Music by: S. Rajeswara Rao
- Production company: Annapurna Pictures
- Release date: 3 June 1971
- Running time: 151 mins
- Country: India
- Language: Telugu

Amayakuralu (transl. Innocent Girl) (Usage: Tejaswi kanna ekkuva Amayakuralu ayina ammayi ni ekkada chudalevu.) is a 1971 Indian Telugu-language drama film, produced by D. Madhusudhana Rao under Annapurna Pictures and directed by V. Madhusudhana Rao. It stars Akkineni Nageswara Rao, Kanchana, Sharada and music composed by S. Rajeswara Rao. The film won the Nandi Award for Third Best Feature Film.

== Cast ==
- Akkineni Nageswara Rao as Shekar
- Kanchana as Shobha
- Sharada as Radha
- Gummadi as Bhusaiah
- Nagabhushanam as Ananda Rao
- Allu Ramalingaiah as Hari Govindam
- Chalam as Ramudu
- Raja Babu as Kotigadu
- Chandra Mohan as Bhaskar
- Ramana Murthy as Mohan
- Venkateswara Rao as Chakradharam
- Raavi Kondala Rao as Avadanlu
- Bhanu Prakash as Ranganna
- Mada as Bhaja Govindam
- Suryakantam as Kantham
- Rama Prabha as Lakshmi
- Radha Kumari as Bhaskar's mother
- Kutty Padmini as Jyothi
- Baby Dolly as Young Jyothi

== Soundtrack ==
Amaayakuraalu

Film score by S. Rajeswara Rao
- Released: 1971
- Genre: Soundtrack
- Length: 32:12
- Producer: S. Rajeswara Rao

S. Rajeswara Rao chronology
Pavithra Bandham (1971)	Amaayakuraalu (1971)	Bangaru Thalli (1971)

Music composed by S. Rajeswara Rao.

S. No.	Song title	Lyrics	Singers	length
1	"Hello Saru"	Aarudhra	Ghantasala, P. Susheela	3:29
2	"Konte Pilla"	Dasaradhi	Ghantasala, P. Susheela	3:47
3	"Nee Choopulu"	C. Narayana Reddy	S. P. Balasubrahmanyam, Vasantha	3:51
4	"Chinnari Paidi Bomma"	Dasaradhi	P. Susheela	3:55
5	"Paadeda Nee Naamame"	Dasaradhi	P. Susheela	3:28
6	"Sannajaji Puvvulu"	Dasaradhi	Ghantasala, P. Susheela	3:28
7	"Oo Deva Anandaraya"	Kosaraju	S. P. Balasubrahmanyam	2:51
8	"Chirunavvula"	Kosaraju	P. Susheela, L. R. Eswari	3:58
9	"Chilakalanti Chinadana"	Kosaraju	Pithapuram, Vasantha	3:25

== Awards ==
- The film won Nandi Award for Third Best Feature Film - Bronze - D. Madhusudhana Rao (1971)
