= Thodi Kodallu =

- Theatrical release poster
- Directed by: Adurthi Subba Rao
- Screenplay by: Adurthi Subba Rao; D. Madhusudhana Rao; Acharya Aatreya (Note: Aatreya is also credited for dialogues.)
- Based on: Nishkruti by Sarat Chandra Chattopadhyay
- Produced by: D. Madhusudhana Rao
- Starring: Akkineni Nageswara Rao; Savitri
- Cinematography: P. S. Selvaraj
- Edited by: Adurthi Subba Rao
- Music by: Master Venu
- Production company: Annapurna Pictures
- Distributed by: Navayuga Films
- Release dates: 11 January 1957 (Telugu); 1 February 1957 (Tamil)
- Running time: 182 minutes
- Country: India
- Languages: Telugu; Tamil

Thodi Kodallu (transl. Sisters-in-law) is a 1957 Indian Telugu-language drama film directed and edited by Adurthi Subba Rao, who co-wrote the script with D. Madhusudhana Rao and Acharya Aatreya. Madhusudhana Rao produced the film for Annapurna Pictures. It stars Akkineni Nageswara Rao and Savitri, with music composed by Master Venu. It is a remake of the 1953 Bengali film Nishkriti, which itself is based on the eponymous novel by Sarat Chandra Chattopadhyay. It was simultaneously made in the Tamil language as Engal Veettu Mahalakshmi (transl. Mahalakshmi from our house). Both films were made by the same banner and director, and share some of the cast and scenes. Thodi Kodallu won the Certificate of Merit for Best Feature Film in Telugu.

Poster of Tamil version

== Cast ==
Actor (Telugu)	Actor (Tamil)	Role (Telugu)	Role (Tamil)
Akkineni Nageswara Rao		Satyam	Gopu
Savitri		Susheela	Susheela
S. V. Ranga Rao		Lawyer Kutumba Rao	Lawyer Ganapathi
Relangi	K. A. Thangavelu	Ramanaiah	Subbu
Jaggayya	M. N. Nambiar	Vaikuntham	Vaikuntham
Chadalavada	Ezhumalai	Tirupati	Tirupati
P. Kannamba		Annapurna	Annapurna
Suryakantam	M. S. Sundari Bai	Anasuya	Anasuya
Rajasulochana		Navaneetam	Sanjala
Parvati		Kamala	Kamala
Master Kundu			
Master Sharat Babu		Babu	
Rood, the dog			

=== Telugu cast ===
- Allu Ramalingaiah as Ayomayam
- Kameswaramma

=== Tamil cast ===
- Kannamba as Annapoorna
- Sampath
- Angamuthu
- Santhanam
- Seshagiri Rao
- Subba Rao
- Master Krishnamoorthi
- Ramakrishnan

Dance

- E. V. Saroja
- A. K. Chopra
- Nataraja Dance School Girls

== Production ==
After the success of Donga Ramudu, producer D. Madhusudhana Rao wanted to continue his success by collaborating again with Nageswara Rao and wanted K. V. Reddy to direct the film. Reddy was busy with prior commitments and suggested Adurthi Subba Rao; however, Nageswara Rao claimed that he had suggested Subba Rao as the director.

An avid fan of literature, Madhusudhana Rao bought the rights to the Bengali novel Nishkriti by Sharat Chandra Chattopadhyay. He wrote the screenplay along with Acharya Athreya and Subba Rao, retaining the major characters and situations from the original novel but making changes to suit local sensibilities, such as changing the character of the second brother from a lawyer to a caretaker of farmland. The film was simultaneously made in Tamil as Enga Veettu Mahalakshmi with the same lead actors and a slightly different supporting cast, with Thangavelu and Nambiar replacing Relangi and Jaggayya. Athreya and Sridhar wrote the dialogues for the Telugu and Tamil versions, respectively. Most of the filming took place at Janapastram, a village near Gudur.

== Soundtrack ==
The music was composed by Master Venu.

Telugu Track List

Song title	Lyrics	Singers	Length
"Kaarulo Shikarukelle"	Acharya Aatreya	Ghantasala	3:39
"Shreerastu Shubhamastu"	Acharya Aatreya	P. Susheela	2:53
"Town Pakkakelloddura"	Kosaraju	Ghantasala & Jikki	4:48
"Aadutu Paadutu"	Kosaraju	Ghantasala & P. Susheela	4:22
"Naluguru Kalisi"	Sri Sri	Ghantasala	3:26
"Kalakaalam Ee Kalata"	Tapi Dharma Rao	P. Susheela	3:32
"Ententa Dooram"	Acharya Aatreya	P. Susheela & K. Rani	3:24
"Nee Shoku Choodakunda"	Kosaraju	Madhavapeddi Satyam & Jikki	3:05
"Gaalipatam Gaalipatam"	Kosaraju	Ghantasala, P. Susheela & K. Rani	4:04
"Bhale Maavayya"	Sri Sri	Jikki	2:45

Tamil Track List

Song	Singers	Lyrics	Length
"Kaarile Savaari Seiyyum"	Ghantasala	Udumalai Narayana Kavi	04:00
"Sendhiru Maadhum Kalai Maadhum"	T. V. Rathnam & group	Udumalai Narayana Kavi	03:15
"Pattanamthaan Pogalaamadi"	Seerkazhi Govindarajan & P. Susheela	Udumalai Narayana Kavi	04:30
"Aadi Paadi Velai Senjaa"	Ghantasala & P. Susheela	Udumalai Narayana Kavi	02:37
"Uzhudhundu Vaazhvaare...Naattukku Poruttham"	T. M. Soundararajan & group	Udumalai Narayana Kavi	05:14
"Pala Kaalam Vethanai"	P. Susheela	Udumalai Narayana Kavi	02:58
"Pollaadha Payalai Serthida Maattom"	P. Susheela & K. Rani	K. S. Gopalakrishnan	02:15
"Mannai Nambi Maram Irukka"	S. C. Krishnan & Jikki	K. S. Gopalakrishnan	03:27
"Kaatthaadi Kaatthaadi"	Ghantasala, P. Susheela & K. Rani	K. S. Gopalakrishnan	02:59
"Pushan Sollai Kedkaame"	K. A. Thangavelu	K. S. Gopalakrishnan	
"Vilakketri Vaikkavum Illai"	Jikki	A. Maruthakasi	02:47

== Awards ==
At the 5th National Film Awards, Thodi Kodallu won the Certificate of Merit for Second Best Feature Film in Telugu.

== Release ==
Both Thodi Kodallu and Enga Veettu Mahalakshmi became commercially successful and ran for 100 days in five centres.
