= Aatma Bandhuvulu =

1987 film

- Theatrical release poster
- Directed by: Dasari Narayana Rao
- Written by: Dasari Narayana Rao (screenplay / dialogues)
- Story by: Mohan Kumar; D. R. Kaushaal
- Based on: Amrit (1986) by Mohan Kumar
- Produced by: Dasari Narayana Rao
- Starring: Akkineni Nageswara Rao; Jayasudha
- Cinematography: Sarath
- Edited by: B. Krishnam Raju
- Music by: Chandra Shekar
- Production company: Taraka Prabhu Films
- Release date: 1 January 1987
- Country: India
- Language: Telugu

Aatma Bandhuvulu (transl. Soul Relatives) is a 1987 Indian Telugu-language drama film, produced and directed by Dasari Narayana Rao under the Taraka Prabhu Films banner. It stars Akkineni Nageswara Rao, Jayasudha and music composed by Chandra Shekar. The film is a remake of the Hindi movie Amrit (1986). Akkineni Nageswara Rao won the Filmfare Award for Best Actor - Telugu for this film.

== Cast ==
- Akkineni Nageswara Rao as Ananda Rao
- Jayasudha as Kalyani
- Dasari Narayana Rao
- Murali Mohan
- Sudhakar
- Prasad Babu
- Rajesh as Rajesh
- Radhika
- Suryakantam
- Rajyalakshmi
- Prabha
- Poornima as Alekya
- Anuradha

== Soundtrack ==
Aatma Bandhuvulu

Film score by Chandra Shekar
- Released: 1986
- Genre: Soundtrack
- Length: 13:48
- Label: Lahari Music
- Producer: Chandra Shekar

Music composed by Chandra Shekar. Music released on Lahari Music Company.

S. No.	Song title	Lyrics	Singers	length
1	"Jeevitham"		S. P. Balasubrahmanyam	4:33
2	"Nee Kannula"		K. J. Yesudas, P. Susheela	4:30
3	"Andhala Potiki"		P. Susheela	4:45
