= Iddaru Mitrulu (1961 film) =

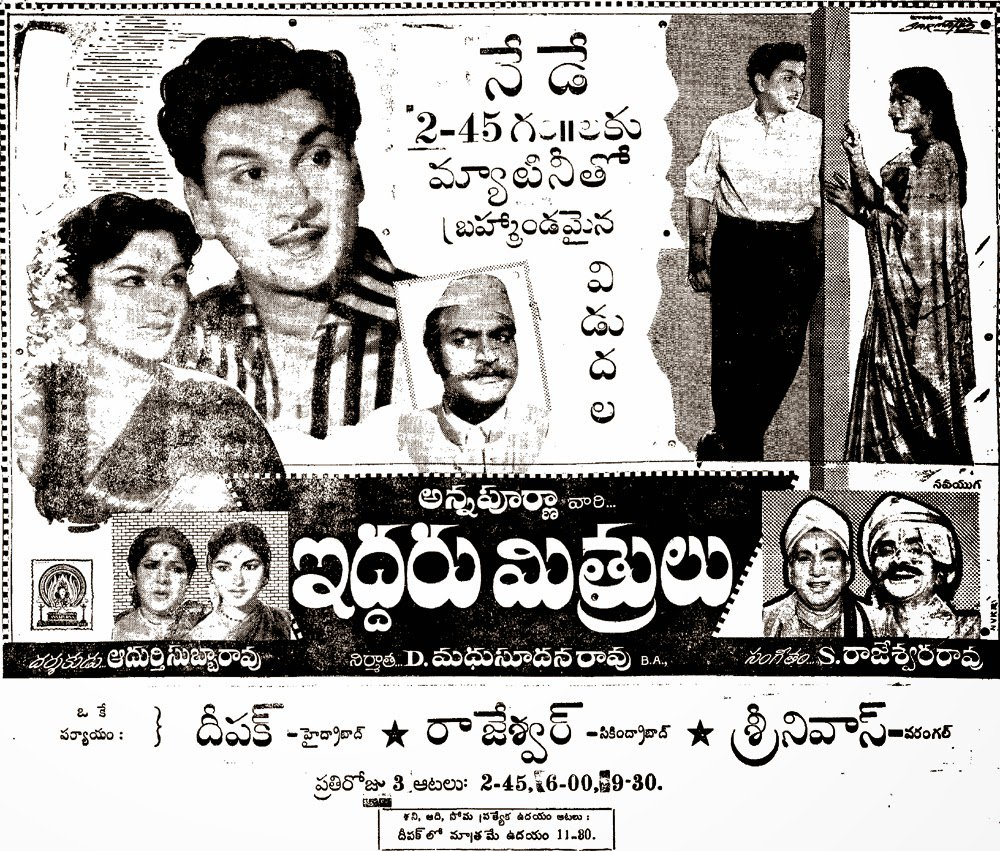
- Theatrical release poster
- Directed by: Adurthi Subba Rao
- Written by: Korrapati Gangadhara Rao (dialogues)
- Screenplay by: K. Viswanath; D. Madhusudhana Rao; Adurthi Subba Rao (Telugu adaption)
- Story by: Gora Sastry
- Produced by: D. Madhusudhana Rao
- Starring: Akkineni Nageswara Rao; Rajasulochana; E. V. Saroja
- Cinematography: P. S. Selvaraj
- Edited by: M. S. Mani
- Music by: S. Rajeswara Rao
- Production company: Annapurna Pictures
- Release date: 29 December 1961
- Running time: 165 minutes
- Country: India
- Language: Telugu

Iddaru Mitrulu (transl. Two friends) is a 1961 Indian Telugu-language action drama film directed by Adurthi Subba Rao and produced by D. Madhusudhana Rao under Annapurna Pictures. The film stars Akkineni Nageswara Rao, Rajasulochana and E. V. Saroja, with music composed by S. Rajeswara Rao. The film was also made in Tamil as Ennai Pol Oruvan. Urvashi Sharada made her Telugu cinema debut in her first significant adult role through this film.

== Cast ==
- Akkineni Nageswara Rao as Ajay Babu and Vijay Kumar (Dual role)
- Raja Sulochana as Sarala
- E. V. Saroja as Padma
- Relangi as Parandhamaiah
- Ramana Reddy as Ramadasu
- Gummadi as Bhanoji Rao
- Padmanabham as Bujji
- Allu Ramalingaiah as Seshavataram
- Suryakantham as Suramma
- G. Varalakshmi as Ajay's aunt
- Sharada as Meena
- Potti Prasad as Kurmavataram
- Boddapati as Varahavataram
- A. V. Subbarao Jr. as Police Commissioner
- Jyothi as Dancer

== Soundtrack ==
Music composed by S. Rajeswara Rao.

Song title	Lyrics	Singers	length
"Hello Hello O Ammayi"	Aarudhra	Ghantasala, P. Susheela	3:12
"Ee Musi Musi Navvulu"	Aarudhra	Ghantasala, P. Susheela	3:41
"Khushi Khushi Ga Navvuthu"	Dasaradhi	Ghantasala, P. Susheela	3:41
"Oho Oho Ninne Korega"	Sri Sri	Ghantasala, P. Susheela	3:23
"Padavela Radhika"	Sri Sri	Ghantasala, P. Susheela	3:20
"Chakkani Chukka Sarasaku Raave"	Aarudhra	P. B. Sreenivas, P. Susheela	3:17
"Navvali Navvali"	Dasaradhi	P. Susheela	4:29
"Srirama"	Kosaraju	Madhavapeddi Satyam	2:41
"Oho Fashionla"		P. Susheela	4:24
