= Yaddanapudi Sulochana Rani =

Indian writer (1940–2018)

- Sulochana Rani
- Born: 2 April 1940; Kaza, Madras Presidency, British India (now Andhra Pradesh, India)
- Died: 18 May 2018 (aged 78); Cupertino, California, U.S.
- Occupation: Novelist
- Writing career
- Language: Telugu
- Period: 1970–2018
- Genres: Romance, playwright, novelist

Yaddanapudi Sulochana Rani (2 April 1940 – 18 May 2018) was an Indian Telugu language novelist. She had a strong fan following since the 1970s and early 1980s, especially among women. Several of her stories were made into films and television serials. She won two Nandi Awards.

== Early life and career ==
Yaddanapudi Sulochana Rani was born on 2 April 1940 in a Telugu speaking family at Kaza in Krishna district, Andhra Pradesh. She used to have strong inclination towards literature from her childhood. She has written over 80 novels.

== Death ==
Yaddanapudi died of a heart attack on 18 May 2018 in California, U.S. while visiting her daughter. The then Telangana Chief Minister K. Chandrashekar Rao, and Andhra Pradesh opposition leader Y. S. Jagan Mohan Reddy offered their condolences.

== Novels made as films/TV series ==
| S. No | Novel | Film/TV series |
|---|---|---|
| 1 | Meena | Meena (1973); A Aa (2016) |
| 2 | Jeevana Tarangalu | Jeevana Tarangalu |
| 3 | (unknown) | Amma Nanna |
| 4 | Secretary | Secretary |
| 5 | Radha Krishna | Radha Krishna |
| 6 | Agni Poolu | Agni Poolu |
| 7 | Prema Lekhalu | Prema Lekhalu |
| 8 | Bangaaru Kalalu | Bangaaru Kalalu |
| 9 | Vijeta | Vichitra Bandham |
| 10 | Jai Jawan | Jai Jawan |
| 11 | Aatma Gowravam | Aatma Gowravam |
| 12 | Prema Deepika | Kanchana Ganga |
| 13 | Girija Kalyanam | Girija Kalyanam |
| 14 | Aatmiyulu | Aatmiyulu |
| 15 | Madhura Swapnam | Madhura Swapnam |
| 16 | Mogali Rekulu | Mogali Rekulu |
| 17 | Chandipriya | Chandipriya |

== Other novels ==
- Keerti Kireetaalu
- Aagamana
- Aradhana
- Aatmiyulu
- Abhijata
- Abhisapam
- Aahuti
- Amara Hridayam
- Amrita Dhara
- Anandha Sametha
- Anuraga Ganga
- Anuraga Toranam
- Artha Sthita
- Ashala Shikharaalu
- Avyaktam
- Bahumati
- Bandee
- Cheekatilo Chiru Deepam
- Dampatya Vanam
- Ee Desham Maakemichchindhi
- Ee Jeevitam Naadi
- Ee Taram Katha
- Girija Kalyanam
- Hridaya Ganam
- Jahnavi
- Jalapatam
- Jeevana Geetam
- Jeevana Tarangalu-1
- Jeevana Tarangalu-2
- Jeevana Satyalu
- Jeevana Sourabham
- Jyoti
- Kalala Kougili
- Krishna Lohita
- Madhura Swapnam
- Meena ( Adapted into A Aa)
- Meena 2 (Adapted into A Aa)
- Mohita
- Manobhirama
- Maduramina Otami
- Mouna Bhashyam
- Mouna Poratam
- Nama Chandrikalu
- Neerajanam
- Nenu Rachayitrini Kaanu
- Nishanta
- Ontari Nakshatram 1
- Ontari Nakshatram 2
- Parthu
- Prema Deepika
- Prema Peetham
- Prema Simhasanam
- Priya Sakhi
- Sahajeevanam
- Samsara Ratham
- Samyukta
- Sitapati
- Snehamayi
- Sougandhi
- Shweta Gulabi
- Sravana Sameeralu
- Vennello Mallika
- Vijetha
- Vemalu

== Awards ==
Nandi Awards

- Best Story Writer - Aatma Gowravam (1965)
- Second Best Story Writer - Kanchana Ganga (1984)
