= Dasarathi =

Telugu poet and writer

Dasarathi Krishnamacharya
- దాశరథి కృష్ణమాచార్య
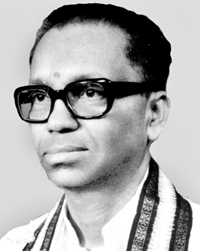
- Dasarathi
- Born: 22 July 1925; Chinnaguduru, Mahabubabad district, India
- Died: 5 November 1987 (aged 62)
- Occupations: Poet, writer, lyricist
- Known for: Revolutionary poetry, activism
- Awards: Sahitya Akademi Award (1974)

Dasarathi Krishnamacharya (22 July 1925 – 5 November 1987), popularly known as Dasarathi, was an Indian Telugu poet and writer. He held the titles Abhyudhaya Kavi and Kalaprapurna. He was awarded the Sahitya Akademi Award for his poetic work Timiramto Samaram (transl. Fight against darkness) in 1974. Dasarathi also served as the Aasthana Kavi (transl. Court poet) of the Government of Andhra Pradesh.

== Early life ==
Dasarathi was born on 22 July 1925 in a middle-class Vaishnava Brahmin family. His native village, Chinnaguduru, is in the Maripeda Mandal of Mahabubabad district. He was an orthodox, yet discreet, Vaishnava devotee and an erudite scholar of Indian Puranas, with proficiency in Telugu, Sanskrit, and Tamil. Dasarathi completed his matriculation at the Khammam Government High School but left higher education to participate in the movement against the autocratic Nizam rule in the Hyderabad Kingdom.

== Career ==
=== Activism ===
As a volunteer in the left-wing Andhra Mahasabha movement, Dasarathi traveled from village to village in Telangana to educate the public. Influenced by Mahatma Gandhi and Kandukuri Veeresalingam, he aligned himself with the political left, as many of his friends were leftists and communist revolutionaries.

=== Poetry ===
Dasarathi began writing poetry at a young age while still a student. His revolutionary poetry, influenced by the communist ideology of Karl Marx, often focused on the downtrodden, the poor, and the exploited workers. He believed that the capitalist, feudalist, and autocratic society under Nizam rule would eventually give way to democracy and equality.

Following the Independence of India in 1947, many independent kingdoms and principalities joined the newly formed Indian Union. However, Hyderabad State, under the autocratic rule of Mir Osman Ali Khan, did not join the Union. Mir Osman Ali Khan struggled to control the atrocities committed by the Mazlis Ittehadul Muslimeen Party. At this juncture, the Indian National Congress, led by Swamy Raamaanandateerdha, called for action against the Nizam's autocratic rule, prompting thousands to participate in Satyagraha (civil disobedience).

=== Arrest and imprisonment ===
In 1947, Dasarathi was arrested and sent to Warangal Central Jail, along with other prominent leaders. He was later transferred to Nizamabad Central Jail, where he continued to write poetry. After his release, he moved to Vijayawada, where he wrote against the Nizam in Telugu Desam, a daily newspaper focused on news and articles related to Telangana and the Nizam's rule.

In 1948, the Indian Union took control of Hyderabad State through police action, ending the autocratic Nizam rule and the violence perpetrated by the Razakars and the Mazlis Ittehadul Muslimeen Party. In 1956, the Telangana region of Hyderabad State was united with the state of Andhra, eventually forming the state of Andhra Pradesh, which existed until 2 June 2014.

After democratic rule was established in Hyderabad, Dasarathi briefly served in the government of Andhra Pradesh. He later worked for All India Radio in Hyderabad and Madras (now Chennai) as a prompter, retiring in 1971. He served as the Government Poet from 1971 to 1984 and also worked as an emeritus producer for All India Radio and Doordarshan (Television).

=== Literary works ===
Dasarathi gained fame through his revolutionary poetry. His first book, Agnidhara (Flowing Fire), was published in 1947 and focused on the Telangana Armed Struggle against Nizam's rule, which he had experienced as a revolutionary. He began writing parts of Agnidhara while in jail and completed it after his release.

His other notable works include Rudraveena (1950), Mahandrodyamam, Punarnavam, Amruthabishekam, Kavithapushpakam, and Ghalib Geethalu (1961). Ghalib Geethalu is a Telugu translation of the poems of Urdu poet Mirza Asadullah Khan Ghalib. He also composed lyrics for numerous Telugu films.

Dasarathi cited the "Nizam's brutal rule, the people's woes under his regime, Indian Independence, the entry of Indian Armed Forces to liberate the Nizam's state, and the fall of the Nizam" as inspirations for his writings.

=== Films ===
Dasarathi wrote lyrics for many Telugu movies, with his debut being Vagdanam (1961). Over the course of his career, he wrote lyrics for approximately 2000 songs in the Telugu film industry. His notable works include the popular films Iddaru Mitrulu (1961) and Pooja (1975).

== Personal life ==
Dasarathi's younger brother, Daasarathi Rangacharyulu, is also an accomplished writer.

U.S.-based singer Sarada Akunuri organized a tribute concert for lyricist Dasarathi and published a book titled Madilo Veenalu Mroge written by V. V. Ramarao in 2020 in Hyderabad.

== Bibliography ==
- Agnidhara
- Rudraveena (1950)
- Mahandrodyamam
- Punarnavam
- Mahaboadhi
- Ghalib Geethalu
- Dasarathi Satakamu
- Kavita Pushpakam
- Timiram Tho Samaram
- Aalochanaalochanalu
- Navami
- Yatraasmruti (autobiography)

== Filmography ==
- Vagdanam (1961)
- Iddaru Mitrulu (1961)
- Khiladi Bullodu (1972)
- Balipeetam (1975)
- Thota Ramudu (1975)
- Pooja (1976)
- Pelli Kani Pelli (1977)

== Quotes ==
- "నా తెలంగాణ, కోటి రతనాల వీణ" [My Telangana is a beautiful hollow stringed instrument decked with innumerable diamonds]
- "నాకు ఉర్దూ తెలుగు రెండు కళ్ళు, ఈ రెండు కళ్ళతో అన్ని భాషలని చదవగలను" [Urdu and Telugu are my two eyes, with which I read every other language]
- "Edi Kakati? Evate Rudrama? Evaru Rayalu? Evadu Singana? Anni Nene! Anta Nene! Telugu Nene! Velugu Nene!"
- "Telanganamu Ritude! Musali Nakkaku Racharikambu Dakkune?"
- "Na Geetavalulenta? Na Aavirbhavulenta? Na Swarakoti?"

== Death ==
Dasarathi died on 5 November 1987 at the age of 62 due to a prolonged illness. He is remembered as a significant figure in Telugu literature and a champion of social justice through his poetry.
