= Suryakantham (actress) =

Indian actress

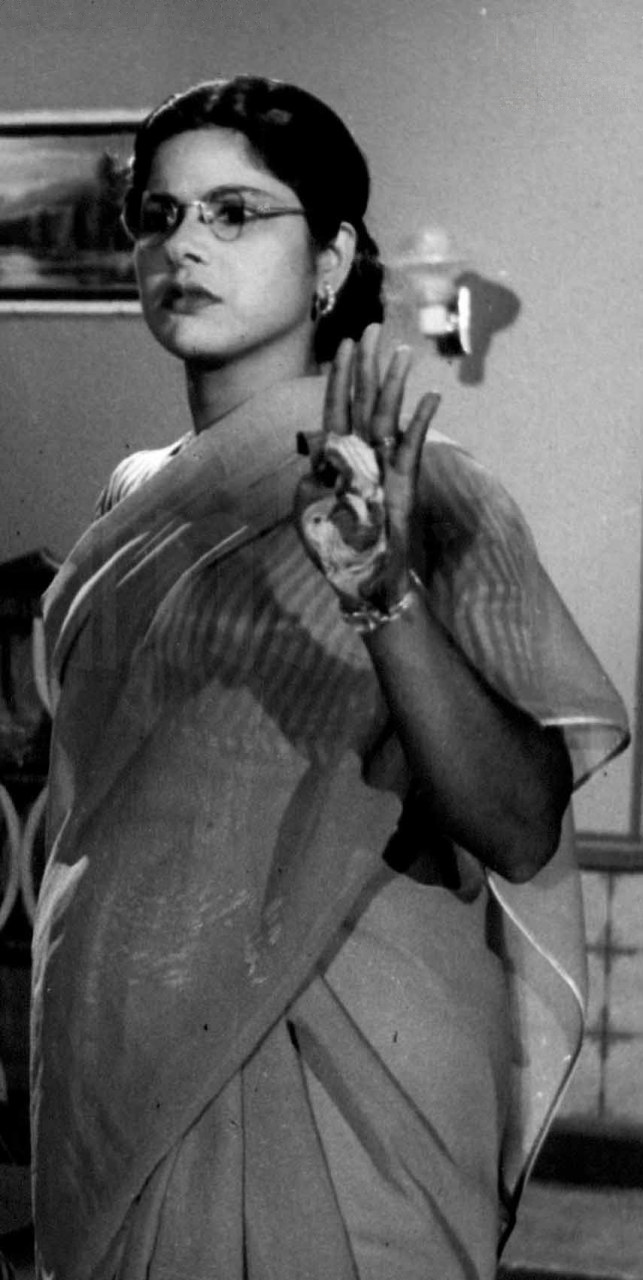
- Suryakantham in the 1954 film Chakrapani
- Born: Suryakantham; 28 October 1924; Kakinada, East Godavari District, Madras Presidency, British India (now Andhra Pradesh, India)
- Died: 18 December 1994 (aged 70)
- Education: Padmavathi Mahila University, A. P.
- Occupation: Film actor
- Spouse: Peddibhotla Chalapathi Rao

Suryakantham (28 October 1924 – 18 December 1994) was an Indian actress in Telugu cinema. She was popular for her portrayal of cruel and cunning women with a comedic touch.

== Early life ==
Suryakantham was born and brought up in a Telugu family residing at Venkata Krishnaraya Puram near Kakinada of East Godavari district in Andhra Pradesh. She was the 14th child to her parents, ten of whose children had died. She learnt dance and singing at the age of six.

She married Peddibhotla Chalapati Rao, a High Court judge, in 1950.

== Career ==
Suryakantham started as a dancer in Chandralekha, produced by the Gemini Studios, for which she had been paid Rs 75 in remuneration. She got her first role as character artiste in Narada Naradi, but eventually quit her job at Gemini Studios.

Later, she got a character artist role in the movie Gruhapravesam. She was offered the heroine's role in Soudamini, which she declined. She later had a car accident, in which she suffered injuries to her face. She later played the role of a cruel mother-in-law in Samsaram.

Another "heroine" role was offered to her by a Bollywood film producer. Knowing that the producer had dropped a heroine from his movie on personal grounds, and that the same was given to her, Suryakantham rejected the offer, saying "I can't live on the unhappiness of other artists." She subsequently appeared in the Telugu film Kodarikam, which brought her a new level of success. The directors B. Nagi Reddy and Chakrapani would not do a movie without Suryakantham. They produced the movie Gundamma Katha, starring N. T. Rama Rao, Akkineni Nageswara Rao and S.V. Ranga Rao, with Suryakantham playing the lead role of Gundamma. The film was commercially successful.

== Awards and titles ==
=== Awards ===
- Mahanati Savitri Memorial Award
- Honorary Doctorate Padmavati Mahila University

=== Titles ===
- Gayyali Athayya
- Sahaja Nata Kala Siromani
- Haasya Nata Siromani
- Bahumukha Natanaa Praveena
- Rangasthala Siromani
- Arungalai Maamani (Tamil)

== Filmography ==
Year	Film	Role
1946	Narada Naradi	
1949	Dharmangada	
1950	Samsaram	Venkamma
1952	Daasi	Dr. Sarala
1952	Pelli Chesi Choodu	Chukkalamma
1952	Prema	Chimlli
1953	Ammalakkalu	Seshamma
1953	Paredesi	
1953	Bratuku Teruvu	Kotamma
1954	Chakrapani	Manorama
1954	Chandraharam	
1955	Donga Ramudu	
1955	Kanyasulkam	Meenakshi
1956	Chiranjeevulu	Akhilandamma
1956	Charana Daasi	Seshamma
1956	Ilavelpu	
1956	Penki Pellam	
1957	Bhagya Rekha	
1957	Dongallo Dora	
1957	Mayabazar	Hidimbi
1957	Todi Kodallu	Anasuya
1958	Bommala Pelli	
1958	Appu Chesi Pappu Koodu	Rajaratnam
1958	Manchi Manasuku Manchi Rojulu	
1958	Mangalya Balam	
1959	Jayabheri	Ratnalu
1959	Krishna Leelalu	
1960	Santinivasam	
1961	Velugu Needalu	Kanaka Durgamma
1961	Bharya Bhartalu	
1961	Pelli Kani Pillalu	
1961	Iddaru Mitrulu	
1961	Kalasivunte Kaladu Sukham	
1961	Sabash Raja	
1961	Vagdanam	Baalamani
1962	Atma Bandhuvu	Widowed daughter
1962	Bhishma	
1962	Gundamma Katha	Gundamma
1962	Kula Gotralu	
1962	Manchi Manasulu	
1962	Mohini Rugmangada	
1962	Rakhta Sambandham	
1962	Siri Sampadalu	
1963	Chaduvukunna Ammayilu	Vardhanam
1963	Lava Kusa	
1963	Mooga Manasulu	
1963	Nartanasala	
1963	Paruvu Pratishta	
1963	Eedu Jodu	Rangamma
1963	Punarjanma	
1963	Tirupatamma Katha	
1964	Doctor Chakravarthy	
1964	Murali Krishna	
1964	Ramudu Bhimudu	
1965	Aatma Gowravam	Santhana Lakshmi
1966	Kanne Manasulu	
1966	Navaratri	
1966	Zamindar	
1966	Paduka Pattabhishekam	Manthara
1966	Aastiparulu	Kaasulamma
1967	Ummadi kutumbam	
1967	Gruhalakshmi	
1967	Poola Rangadu	
1968	Ninne Pelladita	
1968	Govula Gopanna	Mahalakshmi
1968	Vintha Kapuram	Rambanamma
1968	Tikka Sankarayya	Kanthamma
1969	Sri Rama Katha	Charusheela, wife of Pragalbhacharyulu
1969	Aatmiyulu	Mahankali
1969	Muhurtha Balam	Shantamma
1969	Buddhimantudu	
1969	Bhale Rangadu	
1970	Balaraju Katha	
1970	Vidhi Vilasam	Thirupathi's wife Parapathi
1970	Thaali Bottu	
1971	Dasara Bullodu	ANR's Adopted Mother
1971	Srimantudu	
1971	Atthalu Kodallu	Sundaramma
1971	Manasu Mangalyam	
1972	Illu Illalu	Raja Babu's Mother in law – Surammatta
1972	Anta Mana Manchike	Leela Rao
1972	Iddaru Ammayilu	Sundaramma
1972	Kalam Marindi	
1972	Koduku Kodalu	
1972	Vichitra Bandham	Kantam
1973	Andala Ramudu	Samalamma
1973	Ganga Manga	Durgamma
1973	Meena	Meena's caretaker and Krishnaveni's aunt
1975	Mutyala Muggu	Contractor's wife
1975	Pooja	
1976	Padi Pantalu	Kanthamma, wife of Seshayya
1976	Secretary	
1976	Sri Rajeswari Vilas Coffee Club	
1977	Ardhangi	
1977	Andame Anandam	
1977	Yamagola	Seetamma
1978	Goranta Deepam	
1978	Chilipi Krishnudu	
1979	Oka Challani Rathri	Kamakshi
1979	Karthika Deepam	
1980	Buchchi Babu	
1980	Konte Mogudu Penki Pellam	Bhadramma
1980	Gayyali Gangamma	Gangamma
1981	Prema Mandiram	
1982	Pelleedu Pillalu	
1982	Kalavari Samsaram	
1982	Bangaru Bhoomi	Suramma
1983	Pelli Choopulu	
1983	Mundadugu	
1983	Maro Mayabazaar	
1983	Oorantha Sankaranthi	
1983	Sangharshana	
1983	Prema Pichollu	
1983	Konte Kodallu	Varalamma
1983	Lanke Bindelu	
1984	Dandayatra	
1985	America Alludu	
1985	Surya Chandra	
1985	Pattabhishekam	
1985	Kanchu Kavacham	
1985	Rakta Sindhuram	
1985	Bullet	
1985	Palnati Simham	Parvathamma
1986	Ravana Brahma	Annapoornamma
1986	Tandra Paparayudu	
1986	Manchi Manasulu	
1986	Ugra Narasimham	
1986	Chanakya Sapadham	Durgamma
1987	Gundamma Gari Krishnulu	
1987	Ummadi Mogudu	
1987	Aatma Bandhuvulu	
1988	Yamudiki Mogudu	Kali's grandmother
1988	Garjinchina Ganga	
1988	O Bharya Katha	Kanthamma
1989	Bandhuvulostunnaru Jagrata	Sundaramma
1989	Gaduggai	
1989	Rudranetra	
1989	Sahasame Naa Oopiri	
1989	Hai Hai Nayaka	Suryakanthamma
1990	Idem Pellam Baboi	
1993	Ratha Sarathi	Gundamma
1993	One by Two	Balaji's grandmother
1994	Govinda Govinda	
1994	Anna	
1994	S. P. Parasuram	Lakshmikantham

=== Tamil films ===
Year	Film	Role
1952	Kalyanam Panni Paar	
1953	Velaikari Magal	
1953	Poongothai	
