= Kosaraju =

Indian lyricist and poet (1905–1987)

- Born: Kosaraju Raghavayya; 23 June 1905; Appikatla, Guntur district, India
- Died: 27 October 1987 (aged 82); Chennai, Tamil Nadu
- Occupations: Lyricist, poet, actor
- Spouse: Seetharamamma
- Writing career
- Literary movement: Raithu Udyamam

Kosaraju Raghavayya (23 June 1905 – 27 October 1987), known mononumously by his surname Kosaraju, was an Indian lyricist and poet known for his works in Telugu cinema. He wrote about 3,000 songs in 350 films. His lyrics are steeped in Telugu folklore and rural idiom. He was awarded the prestigious Raghupathi Venkaiah Award by the Government of Andhra Pradesh for his contribution to Telugu cinema in 1984.

He wrote memorable songs like "Eruvaka Sagaro", "Niluvave Vaalu Kanuladhana", "Illarikamlo Unna Maza", "Chethilo Dabbulu Poyene", "Anukunnadokkati Ainadi Okkati", "Ye Nimishana Yemi Jaruguno", "Jayammu Nischayammu ra", "Maa Voollo Oka Paduchundi".

== Early life ==
He was born on 23 June 1905 in Appikatla village, Guntur district, Andhra Pradesh to Sri Subbaiah and Smt Lakshmamma whose occupation was agriculture . As Appikatla, his native village was small and the local school had the facility to teach up to 4th class, Kosaraju could not study beyond it. But he studied Telugu literature, epics and puranas at home .Moreover, he was influenced by a Telugu scholar Kondamudi Narasimham Pantulu in whose play based on the Ramayana he acted when still in his teens.

Initially, he worked as a journalist in the Raithu Patrika where he met the famous writer Samudrala Sr. and the director Gudavalli Ramabrahmam. He published his first poetry anthology, Kadagandlu. He died in 1987.

== Film career ==
Kosaraju acted in the Telugu film Raithu Bidda (1939). Later, he shifted his focus to writing lyrics for films. He penned humorous lyrics for K. V. Reddy's Pedda Manushulu (1954), followed by one of his most famous songs, "Jebulo Bomma Je Jela Bomma" (in B. A. Subba Rao's Raju Peda, 1954). He was well known for his earthy poetry, often referring to popular tales of morality and ethics. Kosaraju wrote about 3,000 lyrics for 350 Telugu films.

He wrote memorable songs like "Eruvaka Sagaro", "Illarikamlo Unna Maza" and "Chethilo Dabbulu Poyene".

=== Filmography ===
Year	Film	Songs
1939	Raithu Bidda	Actor
1954	Pedda Manushulu	Nandamaya Guruda Nandamaya
1954	Raju Peda	Jebulo Bomma Jejela Bomma
1955	Nammina Bantu	Chengu Chenguna Gantulu Veyyandi
1955	Rojulu Marayi	Eruvaaka Sagaroranno Chinnanna
1957	Thodi Kodallu	Aaduthu Paaduthu Panichestunte; Townu Pakkakelloddura Dingari
1958	Manchi Manasuku Manchi Rojulu	Anukunndokkati Ainadi Okkati Bolta Kottindile Bulbul Pitta; Kalavari Swartham Nirupeda Dukham Yenatikaina Marena
1959	Illarikam	Bhale Chansele.. Illarikam lo Unna Mazaa; Niluvave Vaalukanuladaanaa!
1959	Jayabheri	Unnaaraa Jodunnaaraa, Mammodinche Vaarunnaaraa
1962	Kula Gothralu	Ayyayo Chetilo Dabbulu Poyene
1962	Manchi Manasulu	Maama Maama Mama Eme Eme Bhaama
1963	Chaduvukunna Ammayilu	Emitee Avataram
1963	Lava Kusa	Ye Nimishaniki Yemi Jaruguno Evaroohinchedaru
1963	Mooga Manasulu	Gowaramma Nee Mogudevaramma Evaramma Vaadevaramma
1964	Devatha	Mavooru Madarasu Naa Peru Ramdasu
1964	Ramudu Bheemudu	Desammu Maarindoy Kaalammu Maarindoy; Saradaa Saradaa Cigarettu
1965	Antastulu	Dulapara Bulloda Dummu Dulapara Bulloda
1966	Sri Krishna Pandaviyam	Bhala Bhala Naa Bandi Parugu Teese Bandi; Mattu Vadalara Niddura Mattu Vadalala
1967	Aada Paduchu	Rikshavaalanu Nenu Pakshilaga Pothanu
1967	Ave Kallu	Maa Voollo Oka Paduchundi Dayyamante Bhayamannadi
1967	Poola Rangadu	Neetiki Nilabadi Nijayateega Padara Munduku Padara
1968	Varakatnam	Sai Sai Jodedla Bandi
1970	Dharma Daata	Evvarikosam Evadunnaadu Pondiraa Pondi
1971	Bomma Borusa	Bomma Borusa Pandem Veyyi Needo Naado Paicheyi
1971	Chelleli Kapuram	Bhale Bhale Maa Annayya
1971	Sampoorna Ramayanam	Ramaya Tandri O Ramaya Tandri.. Maa Nomulanni Pandinayi Ramaya Tandri
1972	Papam Pasivadu	Manchi Annadhey Kaanaraadu
1975	Balipeetam	Takku Tikku Takkuladi Bandira; Yesukundam Buddoda
1975	Pooja	
1976	Manushulanta Okkate	Muthyalu Vasthava Adigindi Isthava
1979	Sri Vinayaka Vijayamu	

== Awards and honours ==
- He was awarded the prestigious Raghupathi Venkaiah Award by the State Government of Andhra Pradesh for his outstanding contribution to Telugu cinema in 1984.
- He was given the titles Janapada Kavi Sarvabhouma and Kaviratna.

== See also ==
- Raghupathi Venkaiah Award
