= Anjali Pictures =

Indian film production company

- Native name: అంజలీ పిక్చర్స్
- Industry: Entertainment
- Founded: 1952
- Founders: P. Adinarayana Rao; Anjali Devi
- Headquarters: India
- Products: Films
- Services: Film production

Anjali Pictures is an Indian film production company established in 1952 by music composer P. Adinarayana Rao and his wife, actress Anjali Devi. The production house is known for producing successful Telugu films, and also ventured into Tamil and Hindi films. The films produced by Anjali Pictures were particularly noted for their emphasis on music.

Later, their elder son Chinna Rao founded the Chinni Brothers banner, under which he produced a few films, with Anjali Devi acting as a presenter. Between 1953 and 1980, Anjali Pictures and Chinni Brothers together produced 27 films, with notable works including Anarkali (1955), Suvarna Sundari (1957), Swarna Manjari (1962), Ammakosam (1970), Bhakta Tukaram (1973), and Mahakavi Kshetrayya (1976).

== Anjali Pictures ==
=== Background ===
Before founding Anjali Pictures, P. Adinarayana Rao partnered with Akkineni Gopala Rao to establish Aswini Pictures. Together, they produced the bilingual film Mayalamari (1951) in both Telugu and Tamil. Following this success, Adinarayana Rao and his wife, actress Anjali Devi founded Anjali Pictures in 1952, with the aim of producing their own films.

=== Founding ===
The first production under Anjali Pictures was Paradesi (1953), a social drama directed by L. V. Prasad. It was actor Sivaji Ganesan's first film but was released only after his celebrated film Parasakthi (1952). The production utilized advanced cinematography techniques, including slow-motion effects, for which they imported a special camera from noted Hindi filmmaker V. Shantaram. Cinematographer Kamal Ghosh was responsible for the technical innovations in the film. Despite its prominent cast and crew, Paradesi was an average grosser at the box office.

=== Notable films ===
After the average performance of Paradesi, Anjali Pictures considered producing a folklore film. Adinarayana Rao formed a writing team with Samudrala Senior and novelist Kovvali, but realizing the project was time-consuming, they shifted their focus to a more immediate project. Inspired by the success of the Hindi film Anarkali (1953), Anjali Pictures decided to produce their own Telugu version, putting the folklore project on hold.

Anjali Pictures’ second film, Anarkali (1955), directed by Vedantam Raghavayya, became a massive success. The film featured a distinguished cast including Akkineni Nageswara Rao as Prince Salim, S. V. Ranga Rao as Akbar, and Kannamba as Jodha Bai. Anarkali was notable for its meticulous production, with outdoor scenes filmed in Mysore. Released in April 1955, the film became a musical hit and ran for over 100-days. The film's songs, such as "Rajasekhara Nee Paayi Moju Teeraledu" and "Raavoyi Sakha," became household hits, and Anjali Devi's portrayal of Anarkali was highly praised by audiences. It was dubbed into Tamil and met with success in that market as well.

Following the success of Anarkali, Anjali Pictures ventured into folklore with Suvarna Sundari (1957), also directed by Vedantam Raghavayya. The film, known for its mythological themes and elaborate dance sequences choreographed by Vempati Pedha Satyam, became a major hit. It depicted the romance between a celestial maiden and a prince, blending fantasy with romance and impressive visual effects. Suvarna Sundari achieved significant commercial success, running for 100 days in 27 centres and celebrating silver jubilees in six locations.

In addition to these films, Anjali Pictures produced several other notable films that made a mark in Telugu cinema. Among these, Bhakta Tukaram (1973) is remembered for its religious themes, further establishing the studio's reputation. Sivaji Ganesan repaid his gratitude to Anjali Devi for casting him in his first film by acting as Chatrapathi Sivaji in Bhakta Tukaram without taking any remuneration and covering all his expenses himself. Mahakavi Kshetrayya (1976) won the Nandi Award for Second Best Feature Film from the state government. Additionally, Phoolon Ki Sej (1964), marked Anjali Pictures' entry into Hindi cinema, extending its influence beyond Telugu cinema.

The production house was known for creating films that combined commercial success with artistic values, often featuring prominent actors of the time such as N. T. Rama Rao, A. Nageswara Rao, and Sivaji Ganesan. Almost all of the films produced by Anjali Pictures had Adinarayana Rao as the music director.

=== Financial struggles ===
Anjali Pictures faced significant financial losses during the production of a Hindi film, leading to a period of hardship. Amidst this struggle, Anjali Devi found solace in the teachings of Sathya Sai Baba. This newfound hope and strength led to the production of the devotional film Sati Sakkubai (1965), which, along with Bhakta Tukaram (1973), became multilingual hits. These successes marked a turnaround for the production house.

== Chinni Brothers ==
Later, Adinarayana Rao and Anjali Devi's elder son, Chinna Rao, founded Chinni Brothers, through which he produced a few films. Anjali Devi acted as a presenter for these films. Among these were Sathi Sakkubai (1965), Sathi Sumathi (1967), and Kunkuma Bharani (1968), and Ammakosam (1970).

Chinni Brothers, though smaller in scale than Anjali Pictures, contributed to the family's continued involvement in the Telugu film industry.

== Filmography ==
=== Anjali Pictures ===
Year	Title	Cast	Director	Language	Notes	Ref
1953	Paradesi	Akkineni Nageswara Rao, Anjali Devi, Sivaji Ganesan	L. V. Prasad	Telugu		
1953	Poongothai	Akkineni Nageswara Rao, Anjali Devi, Sivaji Ganesan	L. V. Prasad	Tamil		
1955	Anarkali	Akkineni Nageswara Rao, Anjali Devi	Vedantam Raghavayya	Telugu		
1957	Suvarna Sundari	Akkineni Nageswara Rao, Anjali Devi	Vedantam Raghavayya	Telugu	Simultaneously shot in Tamil as Manaalane Mangaiyin Baakkiyam	
1957	Manaalane Mangaiyin Baakkiyam	Gemini Ganesan, Anjali Devi, Rajasulochana, Girija	Vedantam Raghavayya	Tamil	Simultaneously shot in Telugu as Suvarna Sundari	
1957	Suvarna Sundari	Akkineni Nageswara Rao, Anjali Devi	Vedantam Raghavayya	Hindi	Remake of Suvarna Sundari	
1960	Runanubandham	Anjali Devi, Akkineni Nageswara Rao, Suryakantham	Vedantam Raghavayya	Telugu		
1960	Adutha Veettu Penn	Anjali Devi, T. R. Ramachandran, K. A. Thangavelu	Vedantam Raghavayya	Tamil		
1962	Mangaiyar Ullam Mangatha Selvam	Gemini Ganesan, Anjali Devi, M. R. Radha, Nagesh	Vedantam Raghavayya	Tamil	Simultaneously shot in Telugu as Swarna Manjari	
1962	Swarna Manjari	N. T. Rama Rao, Anjali Devi	Vedantam Raghavayya	Telugu	Simultaneously shot in Tamil as Mangaiyar Ullam Mangatha Selvam	
1964	Phoolon Ki Sej	Vyjayanthimala, Ashok Kumar, Manoj Kumar	Inder Raj Anand	Hindi		
1971	Kalyana Mandapam	Sobhan Babu, Kanchana, Jaggayya, Anjali Devi	V. Madhusudhana Rao	Telugu		
1973	Bhakta Tukaram	Akkineni Nageswara Rao, Anjali Devi, Sivaji Ganesan	V. Madhusudhana Rao	Telugu		
1976	Mahakavi Kshetrayya	Akkineni Nageswara Rao, Anjali Devi, Manjula	Adurthi Subba Rao; C. S. Rao	Telugu		
1978	Kannavarillu	Anjali Devi, Kaikala Satyanarayana	K. Pratyagatma	Telugu		
1980	Chandipriya	Sobhan Babu, Jaya Prada, Chiranjeevi, Anjali Devi	V. Madhusudhana Rao	Telugu		

=== Chinni Brothers ===
Year	Title	Cast	Director	Language	Ref
1965	Sathi Sakkubai	Anjali Devi, S. V. Ranga Rao, Kantha Rao	Vedantam Raghavayya	Telugu	
1967	Sathi Sumathi	Anjali Devi, Kantha Rao, S. V. Ranga Rao	Vedantam Raghavayya	Telugu	
1968	Kunkuma Bharani	Sobhan Babu, Anjali Devi, Kantha Rao, Rajasree, S. V. Ranga Rao	Vedantam Raghavayya	Telugu	
1970	Amma Kosam	Krishna, Krishnam Raju, Vijaya Nirmala, Anjali Devi	B. V. Prasad	Telugu	
