= Sati Sumathi =

- Theatrical release poster
- Directed by: Vedantam Raghavayya
- Written by: Samudrala Sr; Samudrala Jr (dialogues)
- Screenplay by: Vedantam Raghavayya
- Produced by: Chinna Rao; Anjali Devi (presents)
- Starring: Kanta Rao; Anjali Devi
- Cinematography: Kamal Ghosh; C. Nageswara Rao
- Edited by: N. S. Prakasham
- Music by: P. Adinarayana Rao
- Production company: Chinni Brothers
- Release date: 5 August 1967
- Running time: 164 minutes
- Country: India
- Language: Telugu

Sati Sumathi is a 1967 Telugu-language Hindu mythological film, produced by Chinna Rao under the Chinni Brothers banner, presented by Anjali Devi and directed by Vedantam Raghavayya. It stars Kantha Rao, Anjali Devi and music composed by P. Adinarayana Rao.

== Cast ==
- Kanta Rao as Kaushikudu
- Anjali Devi as Sati Sumathi & Sati Anasuya (Dual role)
- S. V. Ranga Rao as Chandrasena Maharaju
- Relangi as Bhairavudu
- Ramana Reddy
- Haranath as Rama
- Dhulipala as Atri Mahamuni
- Allu Ramalingaiah as Madhavudu
- Dr. Sivaramakrishanaiah as Gramadhikari
- Vangara as Raja Vaidyudu
- Kanchana as Mohanangi
- L. Vijayalakshmi as Madana Manjali
- Suryakantam as Nagamani
- Girija as Makarandam
- Vasanthi as Sita

Special Appearance

- Akkineni Nageswara Rao as Vishnu
- Jaggayya as Brahma
- Gemini Ganesan as Shiva
- Savitri as Parvati
- Krishna Kumari as Lakshmi
- Jamuna as Saraswati

== Crew ==
- Art: Vaali
- Choreography: Vempati
- Dialogues – Lyrics: Samudrala Sr., Samudrala Jr.
- Playback: P. Susheela, S. Janaki, Vasantha, Swarnalata, L. R. Eswari, Madhavapeddi Satyam, P. B. Sreenivas
- Music: P. Adinarayana Rao
- Editing: N. S. Prakasham
- Cinematography: Kamal Ghosh, C. Nageswara Rao
- Producer: Chinna Rao
- Presenter: Anjali Devi
- Screenplay – Director: Vedantam Raghavayya
- Banner: Chinni Brothers
- Release Date: 5 August 1967

== Soundtrack ==
Sati Sumathi

Film score by P. Adinarayana Rao
- Released: 1967
- Genre: Soundtrack
- Length: 52:52
- Label: AVM Audio
- Producer: P. Adinarayana Rao

Music composed by P. Adinarayana Rao. Lyrics were written by Samudrala Sr. & Samudrala Jr.

S. No.	Song title	Singers	length
1	"Swagatamayya"	P. Susheela, S. Janaki	3:20
2	"Andaniki Daasule"	Swarnalata	7:03
3	"Dora Vayasu"	P. Susheela	2:57
4	"Thalalera Viraliki"	Swarnalata	3:52
5	"Hayee Veredhi"	P. B. Sreenivas, S. Janaki	4:46
6	"Korukunna Pathi"	Madhavapeddi Satyam, Vasantha	3:39
7	"Nannu Chera"	P. Susheela	3:48
8	"Naadhuni Kaavarayya"	P. Susheela	6:34
9	"Danamu Dharmame"	P. Susheela	2:08
10	"Nammichedinavadu"	Vasantha	2:10
11	"Mathsarambuna"	P. Susheela	6:28
12	"Jaya Gowri Ramana"	P. Susheela	2:41
13	"Padhyam"	P. B. Sreenivas	0:26
