= Swarna Manjari =

- Theatrical release poster
- Directed by: Vedantam Raghavayya
- Written by: Malladi Ramakrishna Sastry (dialogues)
- Screenplay by: Vedantam Raghavayya
- Story by: Aditya; Malladi Ramakrishna Sastry
- Produced by: P. Adinarayana Rao
- Starring: N. T. Rama Rao; Anjali Devi
- Cinematography: Mahlee Irani; Aadi Irani
- Edited by: N. S. Prakasham
- Music by: P. Adinarayana Rao
- Production company: Anjali Pictures
- Release date: 10 August 1962
- Running time: 156 minutes
- Country: India
- Language: Telugu

Swarna Manjari (transl. Golden Manjari) is a 1962 Indian Telugu-language swashbuckler film, produced by P. Adinarayana Rao under Anjali Pictures, and directed by Vedantam Raghavayya. It stars N. T. Rama Rao and Anjali Devi, with music composed by P. Adinarayana Rao. The film was simultaneously made in Tamil as Mangaiyar Ullam Mangatha Selvam.

== Cast ==
- N. T. Rama Rao as Chandra Bhanu
- Anjali Devi as Swarna Manjari
- Rajanala as Mahendra Shakti
- V. Nagayya as Varma
- Ramakrishna as Lord Jalakanteshwara Swamy
- Padmanabham as Srimukhudu
- Peketi Sivaram as Danka
- Allu Ramalingaiah as Damaru
- Kannamba as Raja Maata Vasundhara Devi
- Jayanthi as Yamini
- Meena Kumari as Latha

== Soundtrack ==
Music composed by P. Adinarayana Rao. Lyrics were written by Samudrala Sr.

| S. No. | Song title | Singers | length |
|---|---|---|---|
| 1 | "Jhanana Jhanana" | Ghantasala, P. Susheela | 3:20 |
| 2 | "Madhuramaina Gurudeevena" | Ghantasala, P. Susheela | 6:40 |
| 3 | "Raave Pranava Roopini" | Ghantasala | 2:33 |
| 4 | "Maimarapinche Ee Sogaru" | S. Janaki | 3:14 |
| 5 | "Tharaliraavaa" | P. Susheela | 3:23 |
| 6 | "Aadaenu Paadaenuga" | S. Janaki | 3:08 |
| 7 | "Chootham Rare" | S. Janaki | 3:08 |
| 8 | "Idhiye Jeevithaanandhamu" | Ghantasala, P. Susheela | 5:35 |
| 9 | "Yemo Yemo Yedhalona" | Ghantasala, P. Susheela, S. Janaki | 3:08 |
| 10 | "Ammaa Nee Aasalanni" | Ghantasala | 3:18 |
