= Runanubandham =

- Theatrical release poster
- Directed by: Vedantam Raghavayya
- Screenplay by: Vedantam Raghavayya
- Story by: Acharya Aatreya
- Produced by: P. Adinarayana Rao
- Starring: Akkineni Nageswara Rao; Anjali Devi
- Cinematography: C. Nageswara Rao
- Edited by: N. S. Prakasam
- Music by: P. Adinarayana Rao
- Production company: Anjali Pictures
- Distributed by: East India Release
- Release date: 7 December 1960
- Running time: 163 minutes
- Country: India
- Language: Telugu

Runanubandham (transl. Debt Relation) is a 1960 Indian Telugu-language drama film, produced by P. Adinarayana Rao under the Anjali Pictures banner and directed by Vedantam Raghavayya. It stars Akkineni Nageswara Rao, Anjali Devi, and music composed by P. Adinarayana Rao. This film had its beginning sequence in Gevacolor.

== Plot ==
The film begins in a village where Lakshmi, an orphan, resides, and Subbanna, a local goon, dotes on her as his sibling. Meanwhile, Zamindar Pratap Rao converts his property into gold due to the Land Ceiling Act and decides to quit. Unfortunately, their house catches on fire, and Zamindar dies. Lakshmi rescues his wife, Kantham & son, Raghu. Before she breathes her last breath, Kantham reveals her ambition to mold her son into a doctor and Lakshmi promises to fulfill her dream. Following this, she shifts to the city to enroll Raghu in the school and strives to be a maid at a school teacher's residence, Narasimham's residence. Here, Suryam, the headmaster's nephew, falls for her, and he, too, decides to take on her responsibility. Now, Subbanna digs out the hidden treasure from the burnt house, hands it over to Govt, and finds the whereabouts of Lakshmi & Raghu. Until then, Pratap Rao's cousin Veerabhadraiah seizes the property, and the concerned authorities deny Subbanna's words when self-esteem Lakshmi quits. Parallelly, Narasimham's wife, Gajalakshmi, learns about the love affair of Lakshmi & Suryam. So, she attributes an illicit relationship between Lakshmi & Subbanna and knits Suryam with her daughter Padma. Knowing it, enraged Subbanna seeks to kill Gajalakshmi and lands in jail. Currently, Lakshmi stands up with courage and toils to fulfill her aim. Years rolled by, and Lakshmi molds Raghu, a doctor, and aspires to construct a hospital to serve those in need. Besides, Veerabhadraiah detects the existence of Raghu. Hence, he intrigues to slay him. Parallelly, Subbanna acquits and divulges the ruse of Gajalakshmi. Suryam rushes for Lakshmi, and by that time, Veerabhadraiah abducts Lakshmi & Raghu. Suryam & Subbanna rescue them, in which Lakshmi dies while guarding Raghu. Finally, the movie ends with Raghu constructing a memorial hospital in the name of Lakshmi.

== Cast ==
- Anjali Devi as Lakshmi
- Akkineni Nageswara Rao as Suryam
- Gummadi as Subbanna
- Suryakantham as Gajalakshmi
- Haranath as Dr. Raghu & Raghu (dual role)
- Master Gopi as Young Raghu
- Relangi as Narasimham
- Rajanala as Veerabhadraiah
- C.S.R as Zamindar Pratap Rao
- Peketi Sivaram as Seetaiah
- Allu Ramalingaiah as Panthulu
- Girija as Padma
- Nirmalamma as Kantham

== Crew ==
- Art: Vaali, Sekhar
- Choreography: Vempati
- Story — Dialogues: Acharya Aatreya
- Lyrics: Samudrala Jr, Kosaraju
- Playback: Ghantasala, P. Susheela, S. Janaki, P. B. Sreenivas
- Editing: N. S. Prakasam
- Cinematography: C. Nageswara Rao
- Music — Producer: P. Adinarayana Rao
- Screenplay — Director: Vedantam Raghavayya
- Banner: Anjali Pictures
- Release Date: 7 December 1960

== Soundtrack ==
Runanubandham

Film score by P. Adinarayana Rao
- Released: 1960
- Genre: Soundtrack
- Length: 37:06
- Label: EMI Columbia
- Producer: P. Adinarayana Rao

Music composed by P. Adinarayana Rao. Music released on EMI Columbia Audio Company.

| S. No | Song title | Lyrics | Singers | length |
|---|---|---|---|---|
| 1 | "Andaalu Chindagaanu" | Samudrala Jr | P. Susheela | 4:49 |
| 2 | "Andhamaina Baava" | Kosaraju | P. B. Sreenivas, S. Janaki | 2:35 |
| 3 | "Yehe Yehe" | Kosaraju | P. B. Sreenivas, P. Susheela | 3:47 |
| 4 | "Lokaalanele Challanayya" | Samudrala Jr | P. Susheela | 2:53 |
| 5 | "Maate Jeevitha Lakshyam" | Samudrala Jr | Ghantasala | 2:49 |
| 6 | "Nindu Punnami Eela" | Samudrala Jr | P. Susheela, S. Janaki | 5:01 |
| 7 | "Oho Oyyari Lahiri" | Samudrala Jr | Ghantasala, P. Susheela | 3:05 |
| 8 | "Raavela Andala Bala" | Samudrala Jr | Ghantasala, P. Susheela | 8:00 |
| 9 | "Yenaatido Ee Bandham" | Samudrala Jr | Ghantasala | 3:07 |
