= Suvarna Sundari =

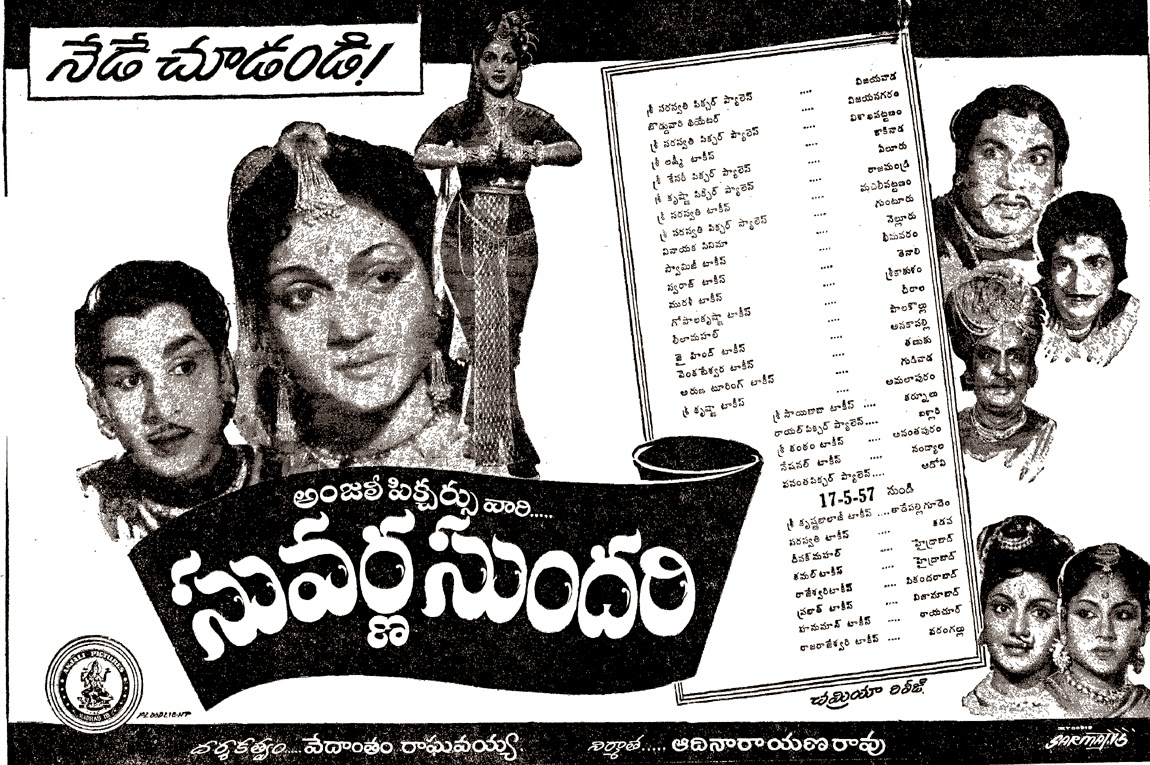
- Theatrical release poster of Telugu version
- Directed by: Vedantam Raghavayya
- Written by: Malladi Ramakrishna Sastry (Telugu dialogues); Udhaya Kumar (Tamil dialogues)
- Screenplay by: Vedantam Raghavayya
- Story by: Vempati Sadasivabrahmam; Adinarayana Rao
- Produced by: P. Adinarayana Rao
- Starring: Anjali Devi; Akkineni Nageswara Rao
- Cinematography: M. A. Rahman
- Edited by: N. S. Prakash
- Music by: P. Adinarayana Rao
- Production company: Anjali Pictures
- Distributed by: Chamria Talkie
- Release date: 10 May 1957
- Running time: 208 minutes
- Country: India
- Languages: Telugu; Tamil

Suvarna Sundari (transl. Golden beauty) is a 1957 Indian Telugu-language swashbuckler film directed by Vedantam Raghavayya. It stars Anjali Devi and Akkineni Nageswara Rao (credited as Nageswara Rao) with music composed by P. Adinarayana Rao. The film was produced by Adinarayana Rao under the Anjali Pictures banner It was simultaneously shot in Tamil as Manaalane Mangaiyin Baakkiyam. Gemini Ganesan played the male lead in the simultaneously shot Tamil version. Actress Kanchana made her debut with this film in a supporting role.

Lata Mangeshkar suggested that Suvarna Sundari be remade in Hindi instead of dubbing the film. It was then made in Hindi with the same title as the Telugu version. Nageswara Rao and Anjali Devi did their roles in the Hindi version as well.

The shooting of the film was held at Venus Studios, Madras and the outdoor shooting was held at Shimsha falls, Mysore. The film was released through Chamria Talkie Distributors, headed by Sundar Lal Nahata, and it set a record at the box office by celebrating 50 days in 48 centres and completed 100 days in 18 centres.

== Plot ==
Once upon a time, there was a kingdom called Malwa. Prince Jayanth is about to leave after civilizing. Just before, Rajaguru's daughter Sarala denounces him for her refusal as he molested her. So, King Chandra Bhanu penalizes the death penalty when Jayanth absconds. On the way, he is acquainted with three sly thieves, Kailasam, Ullasam and Chadastam, who confront Jayanth to resolve the mystery behind Siva’s temple. Therein, Jayanth relieves Gandharva’s curse and bestows him with 3 marvel gifts. A Jug can supply any food, a Mat that can travel anywhere, and a Wand that punishes irrespective of his strength. Meanwhile, the 3 crafty backstab Jayanth, steal, share them, and split.

Fortuitously, a glorious angel named Suvarna Sundari descends and inadvertently collides with him, leading to their entanglement, union, and the conception of Sundari. Hereupon, enraged Indra curses her to be human, dismisses her from Jayanth's mind, and molds him as a statue if he lays a finger on her. Right now, Jayanth quits, and Sundari falls on earth and gives birth to a baby boy, but destiny makes them cleft. Years roll by, and Jayanth, as a wanderer, regains 3 objects, ceasing the trickeries. In between, the mishap turns him into a woman in the day & a male at night, and it relieves only after showering with nectar. Following, he signs in a kingdom as Jayanthi affiliates with Princess Prathima Devi. Eventually, Sundari, in men's guise, follows the same destiny, and she is accredited as its Chief Minister. Simultaneously, their son Siva Kumara is raised by a cowherd; after his death, he sets foot into a temple, where Siva & Parvati rear him.

One night, Prathima encounters Jayanth and loves him. Spotting it, grievous Sundari renounces. Later, Jayanth comes across a demon through it and detaches his curse when, unfortunately, he touches Sundari. Nevertheless, retrieving the past, Jayanth mutates into a statue. At that moment, Siva Kumara checks them into the temple where Siva affirms the boy as their own, and to disengage Jayanth, the boy should pick up the Golden Lotus from heaven. After making an audacious journey, the boy secures his father. At last, they return when Jayanth is proven not guilty. Just as Prathima arrives with her father, he hands her to Jayanth & Sundari. Finally, the movie ends happily.

== Cast ==
Male cast

- Akkineni Nageswara Rao as Jayanth
- Relangi as Kailasam
- C.S.R. as Maharaju
- Ramana Reddy as Vaigundam
- Gummadi as Tata (Goat keeper)
- Balakrishna as Chadastham
- Tupakula Raja Reddy as Lord Indra
- Peketi Sivaram as Vasanthan
- K. V. S. Sharma as Rajaguru
- Lakshmaiah Chowdary as Rakshasa (transl. demon)
- Vempati Sathyam as Lord Shiva
- Master Babji as Siva Kumarudu

Female cast

- Anjali Devi as Suvarna Sundari
- Rajasulochana as Jayanthi
- Girija as Prathima Devi
- E. V. Saroja as Goddess Parvathi
- K. Suryakala as Sarala
- S. Mohana as Dollmaker
- Vasundhara as Naaga Kanyaa

== Production ==
After Paradesi (1953), the inaugural production of Anjali Pictures was an average success at the box office, its producers – husband and wife P. Adinarayana Rao and Anjali Devi – considered making their sophomore production based on folklore. The 1953 Hindi film Anarkali was a success and caught their attention, prompting them to adapt the same story in Telugu with the same title, while putting their folklore film plans on hold; it would eventually be revived as Suvarna Sundari.

== Soundtrack ==
Telugu version

Music composed by P. Adinarayana Rao. In an interview to The Indian Express in 1987, he said for a song in the Tamil version, he "adapted a rare composition of the famous Tanjore quartet" which prompted their sons to file a copyright violation, later Adinarayana Rao was bailed out by his friend.

Song title	Lyrics	Singers	length
"Piluvakuraa Alugakuraa"	Samudrala Sr.	P. Susheela	3:22
"Bangaaru Vannela"	Samudrala Sr.	P. Leela	4:32
"Ammaa! Ammaa!"	Samudrala Jr.	Ghantasala	2:42
"Bommaalammaa"	Samudrala Sr.	P. Susheela	3:58
"Eraa Manatoti"	Kosaraju	Pithapuram	2:51
"Haayi Haayigaa Aamani Saage"	Samudrala Sr.	Ghantasala, Jikki	6:14
"Jagadeeswaraa"	Samudrala Raghavacharya Sr.	P. Susheela (version1), Jikki (version2)	4:29
"Lakshmeem Ksheerasamuri" (Slokam)	Samudrala Jr.	Ghantasala	0:58
"Naa Chitti Papa"	Samudrala Sr.	P. Susheela, M. S. Ramarao	4:19
"Kommanura"	Kosaraju	P. Leela	3:18
"Nee Needalona Nilichenuraa"	Samudrala Sr.	P. Susheela	2:56
"Sambho, Naa Mora Vinavaa!"	Samudrala Sr.	P. Susheela	4:10
"Tadheem Nanana Thom Tillana"	Kosaraju	P. Leela, Komala	2:40

Hindi version

1. "Kuhu Kuhu Bole Koyaliya" – Mohammed Rafi, Lata Mangeshkar
2. "Mujhe Na Bula Chhup Chhup" – Lata Mangeshkar
3. "Ram Naam Japna Paraya Maal Apna" – Mohammed Rafi
4. "Girija Sang Hai Shish Pe Gang Hai" – Lata Mangeshkar
5. "Tarana (Shastriya Sangeet)" – Lata Mangeshkar, Sudha Malhotra
6. "Hat Hat Hat Jaa Re Natkhat Piya" – Lata Mangeshkar, Sudha Malhotra
7. "Lakshmim Sheer Samudra Raj" – Ghantasala
8. "Chanda Se Pyare Ankhiyo Ke Taare Soja Re Maiya Ke Raaj Dular" – Manna Dey, Lata Mangeshkar
9. "Mausam Suhana Dil Hainz" – Lata Mangeshkar
10. "Sar Pe Matki Ankhiya Bhatki" – Asha Bhosle
11. "Shambho Sun Lo Meri Pukar" – Lata Mangeshkar
12. "Lelo Ji Lelo Gudiya" – Lata Mangeshkar
13. "Maa Maa Karta Phire Laadla" – Mohammed Rafi
14. "Mai Hu Pari Rasiya Ras Ki Bhari" – Lata Mangeshkar

The song "Mujhe Na Bula Chhup Chhup" is set in raga Malkauns. The song "Kuhu Kuhu Bole Koyaliya" is set in raga Sohni.

== Reception ==
The renowned director-writer duo, Bapu–Ramana, lauded the film in their review, describing it as a "box office sutrala peddabalasiksha," essentially calling it an encyclopedia of box-office principles.
