= Manaalane Mangaiyin Baakkiyam =

- Poster
- Directed by: Vedantam Raghavaiah
- Written by: Udhaya Kumar (dialogues)
- Story by: Sadasiva Brahmam; Athithyan
- Produced by: P. Adinarayana Rao
- Starring: Anjali Devi; Gemini Ganesan
- Cinematography: M. A. Rehman
- Edited by: N. S. Prakash
- Music by: P. Adinarayana Rao
- Production company: Anjali Pictures
- Release date: 24 May 1957
- Running time: 209 minutes
- Country: India
- Language: Tamil

Manaalane Mangaiyin Baakkiyam (transl. Husband is a woman's fortune) is a 1957 Indian Tamil-language fantasy film directed by Vedantam Raghavaiah, starring Anjali Devi and Gemini Ganesan. The film was made simultaneously in Telugu as Suvarna Sundari with A. Nageswara Rao replacing Ganesan and a slightly different supporting cast. The story is about a human from Earth and an angel from a celestial land falling in love and the many turns the tale takes. It was remade in Hindi as Suvarna Sundari with Anjali Devi reprising her role alongside Nageswara Rao.

== Plot ==
Jayanthan, the prince of Kulothungan Chozlan takes leaves of his Guru, after completing his education. Peeved by his refusal to marry her, Guru's daughter Sarala falsely accuses him of breaching her chastity. The minister's son Vasanthan advises Jayanth to stay incognito for some time to escape punishment from the king. So, Jayanthan gets ousted from the kingdom. He stays in a cave where he meets celestial dancer Sundari, who comes to earth on every Karthika Pournami day. Their love story is laced with curses and boons. They love each other. Lord Indra comes to know about their love and curses Suvarna Sundari. As a result, Jayanth forgets her. She loses her child near the river. How the two protagonists reunite forms the story. Jayanthi played his female guise, due to a curse.

== Cast ==
Male cast

- Gemini Ganesan as Jayanthan
- S. V. Subbaiah as King Deva Rayar
- T. S. Durairaj as Kailasam
- A. Karunanidhi as Ullasam
- K. Balaji as Lord Indra
- Balakrishna as Aghasam
- Sattampillai Venkatraman as Vasanthudu
- Lakshmaiah Chowdary as Ratchasan (transl. demon)
- Master Babji as Siva Kumaran
- Gummadi as Tata, the goat herder (uncredited)

Female cast

- Anjali Devi as Sundari
- Rajasulochana as Jayanthi
- Girija as Prathima Devi
- E. V. Saroja as Goddess Parvathi
- K. Suryakala as Sarala
- S. Mohana as Dollmaker
- Vasundhara as Naaga Kanyaa

== Soundtrack ==
The music was composed by P. Adinarayana Rao. All lyrics were by Thanjai N. Ramaiah Dass. In an interview to The Indian Express in 1987, Adinarayana Rao said for a song in the Tamil version, he "adapted a rare composition of the famous Tanjore quartet" which prompted their sons to file a copyright violation, later Adinarayana Rao was bailed out by his friend.

Song	Singers	Length
"Thesulaavudhe Then Malaraale"	Ghantasala & P. Suseela	05:28
"Azhaikkaadhe Ninaikkaadhe"	P. Suseela	03:42
"Mogamadaa Thaalaadha Modamadaa"	M. S. Rama Rao & P. Leela	03:33
"Jegadheeswaraa"	P. Suseela	05:58
"Mannaadhi Mannarum Kannaale"	P. Leela	04:16
"Neeye En Vaazhvin Nidhiyaagume"	P. Suseela	04:03
"Kanee Nee Vaadaa Kaniye Nee"	M. S. Rama Rao & P. Suseela	04:30
"Munivor Manadhil Oliyaai"	Ghantasala	00:26
"Joraana Bommai Paarungga"	P. Suseela	03:26
"Evanndaa Nam Munne"	S. C. Krishnan	02:48
"Utthana Thom Thom Thanaa"	P. Leela & A. P. Komala	02:21
"Dheva Dhayai Puriya Vaa"	P. Suseela	04:22
"Polladha Maaranum Villendhum"	A. P. Komala	02:57
"Ammaa Ammaa Enum Anaiyaadha"	Ghantasala	03:01
