= Bhale Ramudu =

1956 film

- Theatrical release poster
- Directed by: Vedantam Raghavayya
- Screenplay by: Vedantam Raghavayya
- Story by: Gyan Mukherjee
- Produced by: V. L. Narasu
- Starring: Akkineni Nageswara Rao; Savitri
- Cinematography: M. Masthan
- Edited by: R. Raja Gopal
- Music by: S. Rajeswara Rao
- Production company: Narasu Studios
- Release date: 6 April 1956
- Running time: 178 minutes
- Country: India
- Language: Telugu

Bhale Ramudu is a 1956 Indian Telugu-language drama film directed by Vedantam Raghavayya. The film stars Akkineni Nageswara Rao and Savitri with music composed by S. Rajeswara Rao. It is a remake of the Hindi film Kismet (1943). The film was simultaneously made in Tamil as Prema Pasam.

== Plot ==
Zamindar Narayana Rao has two daughters, Roopa and Tara, who are passionate about dance. Narayana Rao builds a theatre and invites prominent dance teachers from across the country. Nagabhushnam, the manager of Narayana Rao, has two sons, Rama Krishna (Ramu) and Gopal. When Ramu pushes Roopa down a staircase, leaving her disabled, Narayana Rao, in a fit of rage, attacks Ramu, who falls into a river. To protect his legacy, Narayana Rao entrusts his property to Nagabhushnam, who uses this opportunity to seize control, leaving Roopa and Tara orphaned.

Years later, Roopa works hard to care for her sister, Tara. Meanwhile, Ramu, now alive and disguised as Krishna, returns as a burglar. He meets Roopa, falls in love with her, but hides his true identity. Krishna steals a necklace from Nagabhushnam and gives it to Roopa, but she is falsely accused of the theft when Krishna reveals his true identity. Roopa, angered by his actions, distances herself from him.

At the same time, Gopal and Tara fall in love, but Nagabhushnam intervenes, warning Roopa and forcing a separation between Gopal and Tara. Krishna later saves Tara from a suicide attempt and promises to unite her with Gopal. He also resolves to restore Roopa's ability to walk and enlists the help of his friend Appanna. In order to raise the necessary funds, Krishna steals from Nagabhushnam's house, which leads Nagabhushnam to file a case against him.

Roopa, learning of Krishna's selfless acts, repents and forgives him. Krishna plans to arrange the marriage of Gopal and Tara, but Nagabhushnam attempts to stop him. However, Roopa agrees to perform a dance to help Krishna's cause, provided Nagabhushnam withdraws his charges. Narayana Rao, disguised as a wanderer, also steps in and helps Krishna. In the end, Krishna's true identity as Ramu is revealed through a tattoo on his arm.

Nagabhushnam apologises to Narayana Rao and returns the property, which is eventually handed over to Ramu. The film concludes with the marriage of Roopa and Krishna, bringing a joyous resolution to the story.

== Cast ==
- Akkineni Nageswara Rao as Rama Krishna
- Savitri as Roopa
- Relangi as Appanna
- C.S.R as Nagabhushanam
- Gummadi as Inspector
- Chalam as Gopal
- Peketi Sivaram as Manager
- Dr. Sivaramakrishnaiah as Doctor
- Jandhyala Gaurinatha Sastry as Zamindar Narayana Babu
- M.S.Raghavan as Ramadasu
- Gadiraju Keshava Rao as Bansilal Seth
- Girija as Taara
- E. V. Saroja as dancer in the song "Nanyamaina"
- Hemalatha as Parvathi
- Seeta as Bangari

== Soundtrack ==
Music was composed by S. Rajeswara Rao. Lyrics were written by Vempati Sadasivabrahmam.

Song title	Singers	length
"Bangaru Bomma"	P. B. Srinivas, Jikki	2:54
"Bharatha Veera"	P. Leela	3:17
"Bhayamela O Manasa"	P. B. Srinivas	3:25
"Endunnavo Madhavaa"	Jikki, K. Rani	4:40
"Gopaladeva Kaapada Raava"	P. B. Srinivas, P. Leela	3:51
"Intintanu Deepavali"	P. Leela	5:16
"Kala Maayamayena"	P. Leela	3:10
"Muralidhara"	P. Leela	3:16
"Naademaina"	Jikki	3:08
"Oho Meghamala"	Ghantasala, P. Leela	3:03
"Oho Meghamala" - II	P. Leela	4:02
"Emito Idhi Emito"	Ghantasala, P. Leela	4:43

== Box office ==
The film released for a second time on 12 December 1956. This time film ran for more than 100 days in 16 centers in Andhra Pradesh, and celebrated 100 days function in Vijayawada on 14 March 1957.
