= Phoolon Ki Sej =

1964 film by Inder Raj Anand

- Film poster
- Directed by: Inder Raj Anand
- Written by: Inder Raj Anand
- Based on: Andhere Chirag by Gulshan Nanda
- Produced by: Anjali Devi; P. Adinarayana Rao
- Starring: Ashok Kumar; Manoj Kumar; Vyjayanthimala
- Edited by: N. S. Prakasam
- Music by: P. Adinarayana Rao
- Production companies: Vijaya Vauhini Studios; Mehboob Studios
- Distributed by: Anjali Pictures; Rajshri Productions
- Release date: 1964
- Running time: 148 minutes
- Country: India
- Language: Hindi
- Budget: ₹45,00,000 (1964)
- Box office: ₹90,00,000 (1964) ₹68.42 crore (US$7.1 million) (2010)

Phoolon Ki Sej (transl. Bed of Flowers) is a 1964 Indian Hindi-language social film written and directed by Inder Raj Anand. It stars Ashok Kumar, Manoj Kumar, Vyjayanthimala in lead roles, along with Nirupa Roy, Lalita Pawar, Mehmood, Shubha Khote, Mukri, Kanhaiyalal in supporting roles. Music by P. Adinarayana Rao is featured, including the song "Aa Bhi Ja Rasiya". The film was based on Gulshan Nanda's novel Andhere Chirag and was produced by Anjali Pictures, the production company owned by actress Anjali Devi and husband P. Adinarayana Rao. Phoolon Ki Sej is about a love story between Nirmal Verma and Karuna.

Director Anand stated that the film was influenced by James Jones’s From Here To Eternity and Doris Lessing.

== Plot ==
Nirmal Verma (Manoj Kumar) and Karuna (Vjyanthi Mala) are attracted to each other, while the former is touring that part of the country along with his friend Girdhari (Mehmood). They get intimate during a rainy misadventure and he promises to return and leaves his address with her, but she misplaces it. She becomes pregnant and leaves in search of Nirmall at Hyderabad. Didi (Lalita Pawar) keeps her from committing suicide. Later, Karuna delivers her son, Suraj (Master Babloo). Both meet after five years and after formal introductions, get married. Didi doesn't allow Karuna to disclose the truth about the child. She relocates to live with him and his brother, Dr. Verma (Ashok Kumar), and Bhabhi, Janki (Nirupa Roy). She visits her son whenever possible at Didi's place. Girdhari, son of Banwari (Kanaiyalal), is in love with Missy (Shobha Khote), the daughter of Jacket (Mukri). They marry against their parents' wishes and so are kept separate from each other, but they regularly meet in secret. Dr. Verma adopts Suraj when Karuna and Nirmal have gone on vacation. Karuna is shocked to find her son Suraj at home and can't hide her motherly emotions. Nirmal finds out the truth about Karuna from Girdhari, who had seen Karuna at Dr. Verma's hospital earlier. Karuna finally divulges the truth to the family when Suraj gets very sick and calls for his mother. Nirmal also comes back and accepts his responsibility and the family reunites.

== Cast ==
- Ashok Kumar as Dr. Verma
- Manoj Kumar as Nirmal Verma
- Vyjayanthimala as Karuna
- Nirupa Roy as Janki Verma
- Mehmood as Girdhari
- Kanhaiyalal as Banwari
- Lalita Pawar as Didi
- Mukri as Jack
- Shubha Khote as Misy

Choreographer

- Gopi Krishan

== Dances ==
Gopi Krishan and Vyjayanti Mala dance, as well as the Madras Sisters (Sasi, Kala, and Mala).

== Soundtrack ==
No.	Title	Singer(s)
1	"Aa Tu Aa Zara Dil Me Aa"	Lata Mangeshkar, Mukesh
2	"Aa Bhi Ja Rasiya, Man Mora Pyasa"	Manna Dey, Lata Mangeshkar
3	"Jane Mujhe Kya Ho Gaya"	Lata Mangeshkar
4	"Aaj Ki Raat Mohabbat Ka Nasha, Le Liya Dil Hamara Chandni Ne"	Lata Mangeshkar
5	"Aayega Koi Hamraaz Mere Pyar Ka"	Lata Mangeshkar
6	"Subh Din Aaya Bahar Ka"	Lata Mangeshkar
7	"Taron Ki Ankhon Ka Tara Tu"	Lata Mangeshkar
8	"Aaj Ki Raat Mohabbat Ka Nasha"	Asha Bhosle, Mohammed Rafi
9	"Phoolon Ki Sej Pe Jeewan Gujare"	Lata Mangeshkar

== Box office ==
At the end of its theatrical run, Phoolon Ki Sej grossed around ₹90,00,000 with a net of ₹45,00,000, thus becoming the eighteenth highest-grossing film of 1964, with a verdict of average success at Box Office India.
