= Adutha Veettu Penn =

1960 film by Vedantam Raghavayya

- Theatrical release poster
- Directed by: Vedantam Raghavayya
- Screenplay by: Thanjai Ramaiah Dass
- Story by: Arun Chowdhury
- Produced by: Adi Narayana Rao
- Starring: Anjali Devi; T. R. Ramachandran; K. A. Thangavelu
- Cinematography: C. Nageswara Rao
- Edited by: N. S. Prakasam
- Music by: P. Adinarayana Rao
- Production company: Anjali Pictures
- Release date: 11 February 1960
- Running time: 145 minutes
- Country: India
- Language: Tamil

Adutha Veettu Penn (transl. The Girl Next Door) is a 1960 Indian Tamil-language romantic comedy film directed by Vedantam Raghavayya and written by Thanjai N. Ramaiah Dass. The film stars Anjali Devi (who co-produced the film with her husband, composer P. Adinarayana Rao), T. R. Ramachandran and K. A. Thangavelu. It is a remake of the Bengali film Pasher Bari (1952), itself based on the namesake short story by Arun Chowdhury. In Adutha Veettu Penn, a simple man wants to impress a woman he loves by singing, but since he cannot, his friend, a singer, sings in secret while the simple man merely lip syncs, and wins the woman's love. The film was released on 11 February 1960, and became a success.

== Plot ==
Mannaru, a simple man, falls in love with his wealthy neighbour Leela, who sings and dances well. He wants to impress her by singing, but he cannot sing. So he seeks the help of his friend, a singer who agrees. While the friend sings in secret, Mannaru merely lip syncs. Leela is charmed by what she thinks is Mannaru singing and falls in love with him. Soon the truth comes out, and the rest of the film deals with how the tangle between the lovers is solved.

== Cast ==
Adapted from the film's songbook and opening credits:

Male cast

- T. R. Ramachandran as Mannaru
- K. A. Thangavelu as the singer
- K. Sarangapani as Mannaru's uncle
- M. R. Santhanam
- Pakkirisami
- L. Narayana Rao as Saroja's father
- A. Karunanidhi as friend
- P. D. Sambandam as the marriage broker
- Friend Ramsami as friend
- S. Venkataraman as friend
- K. Ramu, K. Chetty, P. Ramachandra Rao

Female cast

- Anjali Devi as Leela
- C. T. Rajakantham as Leela's mother
- M. Saroja as Leela's friend
- Balakumari
- T. P. Muthulakshmi as Saroja
- Madhuri
- Ranjitham, Radharani (as Julius Caesar in ‘Mannava Va’ Song), Rita

== Production ==
Adutha Veettu Penn is a remake of the Bengali film Pasher Bari (1952), itself based on the namesake short story by Arun Chowdhury. The film was produced by Anjali Devi (who also starred as the female lead) and her husband P. Adinarayana Rao, who also composed the music. Anjali Devi reprised her role from Pasher Bari's Telugu adaptation Pakka Inti Ammayi (1953). The film's animated opening credits were created by Dayabhai Patel. The screenplay was written by Thanjai N. Ramaiah Dass, cinematography was handled by C. Nageswara Rao, and the editing by N. S. Prakasam. While primarily in black and white, the film was partly coloured using Gevacolor. Its final length was 16,887 feet (5,147 m).

== Influences ==
Although the opening credits of Adutha Veettu Penn acknowledge the source film Pasher Bari, Saritha Rao Rayachoti (writing for Scroll.in) opines that it has some similarities with Edmond Rostand's play Cyrano de Bergerac, in which the male lead Cyrano loves his cousin Roxane but feels he is not worthy of her due to his large nose; so he romances her by proxy, i.e. he writes her love letters for which another man, Christian de Neuvillette, claims credit at Cyrano's request. According to Rayachoti, the film eschewed the play's tragedy elements in favour of romantic comedy overtones.

== Soundtrack ==
The soundtrack album was composed by P. Adinarayana Rao, with lyrics were by Thanjai N. Ramaiah Dass. The song "Vanitha Maniye" is set in the Hamsadhvani raga, while "Kannale Pesi Pesi Kolladhe" is set in Keeravani, and "Kangalum Kavi Paaduthe" is set in Hindolam. The album was a major breakthrough for P. B. Sreenivas, who sang five of the film's songs. According to The Hindu's B. Kolappan, the film "proved beyond doubt that Sreenivas was going to secure an established place in Tamil film music."

Song	Singers	Length
"Maalaiyil Malar Solaiyil"	P. B. Sreenivas	03:30
"Mannava Vaa"	P. Susheela	04:30
"Sayonaaraa Tokyo"	P. B. Sreenivas, S. Janaki	03:18
"Katraar Niraindha Sangamidhu"	A. L. Raghavan	03:32
"Kannale Pesi Pesi Kolladhe"	P. B. Sreenivas	03:27
"Kangalum Kavi Paadudhe"	Sirkazhi Govindarajan, Thiruchi Loganathan	03:09
"Malarkodi Naane"	P. Susheela	03:15
"Kaiyyum Odala Kaalum Odala"	S. C. Krishnan, T. V. Rathnam	03:07
"Vaadaatha Pushpame.... Vanithaa Maniye"	P. B. Sreenivas	02:48
"Kanni Thamizh"	P. Susheela	04:02
"Enakkaga Neeye"	P. Susheela, P. B. Sreenivas	04:02

== Release and reception ==
Adutha Veettu Penn was released on 11 February 1960. A review from the magazine Ananda Vikatan, dated 27 March 1960, called the film a must-watch for the comedy and dance sequences which were in colour. Kanthan of Kalki said no one could have done the role of Mannaru better than Ramachandran. According to historian Randor Guy, it was a major commercial success primarily because of its full-length situational comedy, then a rarity in Indian cinema and more so in Tamil.

== Bibliography ==
- Sundararaman (2007) [2005]. Raga Chintamani: A Guide to Carnatic Ragas Through Tamil Film Music (2nd ed.). Chennai: Pichhamal Chintamani. OCLC 295034757.
