= Annadata (1954 film) =

- Theatrical release poster
- Directed by: Vedantam Raghavayya
- Written by: M. V. Krishna Sarma; Dr. Balasundara Rao (dialogues)
- Screenplay by: Vedantam Raghavayya
- Story by: K. Gopala Rao
- Produced by: K. Gopala Rao and Nagisetty Mukunda Rao
- Starring: Akkineni Nageswara Rao; Anjali Devi
- Cinematography: C. Nageswara Rao
- Edited by: N. S. Prakasam
- Music by: P. Adinarayana Rao
- Production company: Ashwaraj Films
- Release date: 17 December 1954
- Country: India
- Language: Telugu

Annadata (transl. Farmer) is a 1954 Telugu-language drama film, produced by K. Gopala Rao under the Ashwaraj Films banner and directed by Vedantam Raghavayya. It stars Akkineni Nageswara Rao and Anjali Devi, with music composed by P. Adinarayana Rao.

The film was dubbed into Tamil-language and released in 1957.

== Cast ==
- Akkineni Nageswara Rao as Bangaraiah
- Anjali Devi as Shanta
- S. V. Ranga Rao as Kamaiah Naidu
- Chalam as Rangababu
- Chadalavada as Keetanna
- Dr. Sivaramakrishnayya as Jatakaala Zamindar
- Surabhi Maalabai as Rangamma
- Chhaya Devi as Subbulu
- Ammaji as Kalyani / Annapurna
- Shanta Kumari (Jr.) as Leela

== Crew ==
- Art: T. V. S. Sharma
- Choreography: Vempati
- Dialogues: M. V. Krishna Sarma, Dr. Balasundara Rao
- Playback: A. M. Rajah, Pendyala Nageswara Rao, Madhavapeddi Satyam, M. S. Ramarao, Jikki, Krishnaveni, Padma
- Music, Lyrics: P. Adinarayana Rao
- Editing: N. S. Prakasam
- Cinematography: C. Nageswara Rao
- Story - Producer: K. Gopala Rao and Nagisetty Mukunda Rao.
- Screenplay - Director: Vedantam Raghavayya
- Banner: Ashwaraj Films
- Release Date: 17 December 1954

== Soundtrack ==
Annadata

Film score by P. Adinarayana Rao
- Released: 1954
- Genre: Soundtrack
- Producer: P. Adinarayana Rao

The music and lyrics are by P. Adinarayana Rao. The music was released on Audio Company.

S. No.	Song title	Singers	length
1	"Kaatakam"		
2	"Kasthuri Ranga Ranga"	Jikki	
3	"Swargamidenoyi"		
4	"Pralaya Prayodhijala"	P. Susheela	
5	"Jaya Jaya Yaduveera"		
6	"Oo Rangu Rangula"	Pithapuram Nageswara Rao & P. Susheela	
7	"Manchi Neelatho"		
8	"Sati Savitri" (Naatakam)		
