= P. Adinarayana Rao =

- Born: Penupatruni Adinarayana Rao; 21 August 1914; Kakinada, Andhra Pradesh
- Died: 19 August 1991 (aged 77)
- Occupation: Music director
- Years active: 1951–1991
- Spouse: Anjali Devi (m. 1948)

Penupatruni Adinarayana Rao (21 August 1914 – 19 August 1991) was an Indian music director, film producer, lyricist and play writer. He co-founded "Aswini Pictures" with Akkineni Nageswara Rao and produced some movies in Telugu and Tamil. Later, he produced several blockbuster Telugu films under his own production house, Anjali Pictures, named after his actress wife, Anjali Devi. He also composed and produced music for several Tamil and Hindi films.

According to the music critic V. A. K. Rangarao,

"Adinarayana Rao is credited for introducing Hindustani music in contemporary flavour and simplified orchestration, and thereby impressing both laymen audience as well cognoscenti. It is this music that survives him enthralling all the music lovers".

Memorable music compositions from Rao are: "Rajasekhara Neepai Moju Theera Leduraa" in the film Anarkali released in 1955, "Piluvakuraa Alugakuraa" in the film Suvarna Sundari released in 1957, "Telugu Veera Levaraa Deeksha Booni Sagara" and "Vastaadu Naraju" in the film Alluri Seetarama Raju released in 1974 and all songs including "Ghana Ghana Sundara" in Bhakta Tukaram, released in 1973. Some of his most popular compositions come from Suvarna Sundari and include Hayi hayiga Amani Saage (Telugu), Kuhu Kuhu bole Koyaliya (Hindi), and Thesulavuthe (Tamil).

Music directors such as Satyam, T. V. Raju, M. Ranga Rao,"JosephKrishna" and Laxmikant–Pyarelal worked under him as assistant directors during the early stages of their careers.

== Life ==
Adinarayana Rao was born in 1914 in Kakinada of East Godavari district in Andhra Pradesh to Penupatruni Krishnayya Gowd and Penupatruni Anasuya. He completed his matriculation in Kakinada.

He started his film career as a child artiste at the age of six, under Rajarajeswari Naatya Mandali's baton playing the roles of mythological characters such as "Narada" and "Savitri". Later, he studied classical music under Patrayani Sitaramsastry in Saluru. By age of 12, he played many musical instruments and had shown his talent in both music as a composer, and on stage as a playwright.

=== Theatre ===
He was well known in Kakinada theatre circle, with plays like Black Market, Vasanta Sena and Veedhi Gaayakulu, with which he still continued after entering the film industry and was affectionately given a nickname "Abbayi Garu". The play Street Singers written by him was admired, and his wife Anjali Devi received a gold medal and a citation from Sir Arthur Hope, then governor of the Madras Presidency in 1943. He fine-tuned his skills to become a well known artiste while working under the 'Burmah Shell Amateurs Troupe', through the famous 'Young Mens Happy Club', which produced stalwarts from the Telugu film industry like Relangi, S. V. Ranga Rao, Gandikota Jagannatham and Anjali Devi. Here he met his future wife Anjali Devi.

=== Film ===
He and S. V. Ranga Rao made their debut into the film industry with the film Varudhini in 1946. Adinarayana Rao wrote lyrics and composed music for two songs in that film. He wrote lyrics and composed music for two more films. He got a break with the film Gollabhama (1947) directed by C. Pullaiah, in which his wife Anjali Devi made her debut. He was the music director for the film Palletoori Pilla in 1950. He married Anjali Devi in 1948, and they had two sons. His granddaughter Saila Rao is also an actress.

He promoted his assistant Dholak Satyam to co-music director for the film Bhakta Kannappa. His background score and interlude compositions using Hindustani classical ragas involved a wide array of instruments in the Telugu film industry.

During the 1980s, he mainly composed music and wrote lyrics under Padmalaya Studios for the actor Krishna until the former's death in 1991.

=== Aswini Pictures ===
Adinarayana Rao founded "Aswini Pictures", together with Akkineni Nageswara Rao and makeup artist K. Gopala Rao, to produce movies like "Maayalamaari" in 1951 in Telugu, "Mayakkaari" in Tamil, and "Annadhata" in 1954, for which he wrote lyrics and composed music.

=== Anjali Pictures ===
He started a production house 'Anjali Pictures' in 1951, using the name of his wife after parting ways with Aswini Pictures. He produced some of the blockbusters in the film industry like Paradesi in 1952 in Telugu, which was directed by L. V. Prasad, Poongottai in Tamil, Anarkali in 1955, Suvarna Sundari in 1957 and Bhakta Tukaram in 1973. In all these movies, his wife Anjali Devi acted as the lead heroine. Most of the movies he produced had Akkineni Nageswara Rao as a lead actor.

He also produced movies in Hindi such as Phoolon Ki Sej in 1964 and Suvarna Sundari, for which he wrote the script (1957).

== Filmography ==
=== Producer ===
Year	Film title
1951	Maayalamaari
1951	Mayakkaari
1953	Pardesi
1953	Poongothai
1954	Annadata
1955	Anarkali
1957	Suvarna Sundari
1962	Swarnamanjari
1964	Phoolon Ki Sej
1965	Sati Sakkubai
1970	Ammakosam
1973	Bhakta Tukaram
1976	Mahakavi Kshetrayya
1980	Chandipriya

=== Music director ===
Year	Film	Language	Director	Banner	Notes
1947	Gollabhama	Telugu	C. Pullayya	Sobhanachala Studios	
1950	Palletoori Pilla	Telugu	B. A. Subba Rao	Poorna Films	
1951	Maayakkari	Tamil	P. Sridhar	Aswini Pictures	
1951	Mayalamari	Telugu	P. Sridhar	Aswini Pictures	
1951	Mayamalai	Tamil	Raja Saheb of Mirzapur	Sobhanachala Studios	
1951	Tilottama	Telugu	Raja Saheb of Mirzapur	Sobhanachala Studios	
1953	Paradesi	Telugu	L. V. Prasad	Anjali Pictures	
1953	Poongothai	Tamil	L. V. Prasad	Anjali Pictures	
1954	Annadata	Telugu	Vedantam Raghavayya	Ashwaraj Films	
1955	Anarkali	Telugu	Vedantam Raghavayya	Anjali Pictures	
1955	Anarkali	Tamil	Vedantam Raghavayya	Anjali Pictures	
1957	Karpin Jothi	Tamil	Vedantam Raghavayya	Ashwaraj Films	
1957	Manaalane Mangaiyin Baakkiyam	Tamil	Vedantam Raghavayya	Anjali Pictures	
1957	Suvarna Sundari	Telugu	Vedantam Raghavayya	Anjali Pictures	
1960	Adutha Veettu Penn	Tamil	Vedantam Raghavayya	Anjali Pictures	
1960	Runanubandham	Telugu	Vedantam Raghavayya	Anjali Pictures	
1962	Mangaiyar Ullam Mangatha Selvam	Tamil	Vedantam Raghavayya	Anjali Pictures	
1962	Swarna Manjari	Telugu	Vedantam Raghavayya	Anjali Pictures	
1964	Phoolon Ki Sej	Hindi	Inder Raj Anand	Vijaya Vauhini Studios & Mehboob Studios	
1965	Sati Sakkubai	Telugu	Vedantam Raghavayya	Anjali Pictures	
1967	Sathi Sumathi	Telugu	Vedantam Raghavayya	Anjali Pictures	
1968	Kumkuma Bharani	Telugu	Vedantam Raghavayya	Anjali Pictures	
1970	Agni Pareeksha	Telugu	K. Varaprasad Rao	Padmalaya Studios	
1970	Amma Kosam	Telugu	B. V. Prasad	Chinni Brothers	
1971	Mosagallaku Mosagadu	Telugu	K. S. R. Das	Padmalaya Studios	
1971	Kalyana Mandapam	Telugu	V. Madhusudhana Rao	Anjali Pictures	
1971	Sati Ansuya	Telugu	B. A. Subba Rao	Srikanth & Srikanth Enterprises	
1973	Bhakta Tukaram	Telugu	V. Madhusudhana Rao	Anjali Pictures	
1973	Pedda Koduku	Telugu	K. S. Prakash Rao	Srikanth & Srikanth Enterprises	
1974	Alluri Seetarama Raju	Telugu	V. Ramachandra Rao	Padmalaya Studios	
1976	Mahakavi Kshetrayya	Telugu	Adurthi Subba Rao	Anjali Pictures	
1976	Bhakta Kannappa	Telugu	Bapu	Gopi Krishna Movies	with Satyam
1978	Kannavari Illu	Telugu	K. Pratyagatma		
1980	Chandipriya	Telugu	V. Madhusudhana Rao	Anjali Pictures	
1981	Shirdi Saibaba	Telugu	Ashok Bhushan		with M. Ranga Rao

=== Writer ===
- Suvarna Sundari in 1957.
- 'bhaarateeya samgeeta Saastramu aadi naarayaNeeyamu' a scholary book.

== Awards ==
- He won Nandi Award for Second Best Feature Film - Silver - Mahakavi Kshetrayya (1976)
- Bombay Journalist Association Nationwide Best Music Director Award for film Suvarna Sundari.

== Adinarayana Rao Award ==
Anjali Devi launched the Adinarayana Rao Award (using her husband's name) beginning in 2011. Noted playback singer P. Susheela was the first recipient of the award.
