= Rechukka =

- Theatrical release poster
- Directed by: P. Pullaiah
- Written by: Malladi Ramakrishna Sastry (dialogues)
- Screenplay by: P. Pullaiah
- Story by: Ghantasala Balaramaiah
- Produced by: Ghantasala Krishnamurthy
- Starring: N. T. Rama Rao; Anjali Devi
- Cinematography: P. L. Roy
- Edited by: G. D. Joshi
- Music by: Ashwathama
- Production company: Pratibha Productions
- Release date: 25 March 1955
- Running time: 145 mins
- Country: India
- Language: Telugu

Rechukka (transl. Night Star) is a 1955 Indian Telugu-language swashbuckler film directed by P. Pullaiah. The film stars N. T. Rama Rao, Anjali Devi with music composed by Aswatthama. The story was inspired by The Prince Who Was a Thief (1951), starring Tony Curtis.

The film was remade in Tamil and titled Naattiya Thara. The Tamil version was released in 1955. Thanjai N. Ramaiah Dass wrote the dialogues and lyrics for the Tamil version, while G. Ramanathan scored the music. It was also a commercial hit. Aaroor Dass, who was a successful screenplay writer later, started his career as an assistant to Thanjai N. Ramaiah Dass in 1955 and assisted in writing the dialogues for this film. He has said that he named his first child as Arokyamary and also gave a pet name, Thara Devi in remembrance of the film Nattiya Thara.

== Cast ==
- N. T. Rama Rao as Kumarayalu / Kannaiah
- Anjali Devi as Nana
- Devika as Lalitha Devi
- Mukkamala as Maharaju Devarayalu
- Nagabhushanam as Veeranna
- Sadasiva Rao as Mahamantri
- Peketi Sivaram as Annayya
- Joga Rao as Chandrayya
- Y. V. Raju as Nagulu
- A N R as Guest

== Soundtrack ==
Music composed by Aswatthama. Lyrics by Malladi Ramakrishna Sastry. Music released by Audio Company.

S. No.	Song title	Singers	length
1	"Aa Manasemo Aa Sogasemo"	Jikki	3:07
2	"Aaye Sambarame"	P. Leela	3:42
3	"Ayyo Bangaru Saami"	P. Leela	4:12
4	"Bhale Bhala Paavurama"	Ghantasala	3:12
5	"Ekkadidi Ee Andam"	Jikki	3:13
6	"Etu Choosina"	P. Leela	4:04
7	"Neesari Nevanamma"	P. Leela	3:37
8	"Ontarontariga Poyedana"	Ghantasala	2:33

== Production ==
The Rechukka film is an outcome of Ghantasala Balaramaiah, Telugu film producer of Pratibha Pictures and General Manager and Production Executive of the company Thopalli Venkata Sundara Shivarama Sastry (better known as Pratibha Sastry). Sastry has seen the English film entitled The Prince Who Was a Thief in Mount Road. Balaramaiah prepared a story to suit the local audience. The story was given to Malladi Ramakrishna Sastry, who wrote the screenplay, dialogues and lyrics for the film.

The shooting was started with N. T. Rama Rao, Anjali Devi and supporting staff and Ashwathamma as music director. After shooting three reels including two songs, Ghantasala Balaramaiah died suddenly due to Heart attack on 29 October 1953. Ghantasala Krishna Murthy, the elder son of Balaramaiah has taken the charge of Pratibha pictures. Nageshwara Rao wished to be a part of the film after the demise of his mentor Balaramaiah. He made a cameo appearance. The film is completed with the financial involvement of Sunderlal Nahata and director P. Pullaiah.

Most of the film was shot at Revathi Studios at Madras. Prakash Studios was used for few important scenes. The forest scenes are pictured at Jamal Gardens (Now Vijaya Gardens).

For the role of Lalitha Devi, they wanted to take a new actress. They have chosen Prameela, the grand daughter of Raghupathi Venkaiah to portray the character besides N. T. Rama Rao. She changed her name as Devika and became a big star in later years.

== Box-office ==
The film was a commercial hit and ran for more than 100 days in three centres in Andhra Pradesh. Centenary celebrations are organized at Vijayawada.
