= Prema Pasam =

1956 film directed by Vedantam Raghavayya

- Theatrical release poster
- Directed by: Vedantam Raghavayya
- Screenplay by: Vedantam Raghavayya
- Story by: Gyan Mukherjee
- Produced by: V. L. Narasu
- Starring: Gemini Ganesan; Savitri
- Cinematography: M. Masthan
- Edited by: R. Raja Gopal
- Music by: S. Rajeswara Rao
- Production company: Narasu Studios
- Distributed by: Chamria
- Release date: 21 March 1956
- Running time: 178 minutes
- Country: India
- Language: Tamil

Prema Pasam is a 1956 Indian Tamil-language film, produced by V. L. Narasu and directed by Vedantam Raghavayya. It is a remake of the Hindi film Kismet (1943). The film stars Gemini Ganesan and Savitri, with music composed by S. Rajeswara Rao. It was simultaneously shot in Telugu as Bhale Ramudu (1956). The film was released on 23 March 1956.

== Plot ==
Zamindar Narayana Pillai has two daughters, Prema and Tara, both of whom have been learning dance since childhood. Prema is especially fascinated by it, so Narayana Pillai builds a theatre and invites dance teachers from all over the country. Nagabhushnam, who is Narayana Pillai’s manager, has two sons: Ramakrishnan (Ramu) and Radhakrishnan.

One day, Ramu pushes Prema down a staircase, leaving her disabled. The enraged Narayana Pillai shoots Ramu, who falls into a river. After that, Narayana Pillai disappears, entrusting his property to Nagabhushnam. Nagabhushnam takes control of the property, leaving Prema and Tara as orphans.

Years pass. Prema works hard, studies, and takes care of Tara. Ramu returns as a burglar, under the name Krishna. Although he recognises everyone, he hides his identity. He meets Prema and they fall in love. After that, Krishna steals a necklace from Nagabhushnam and gives it to Prema. When Krishna reveals his true identity, Prema is falsely accused of the theft. She is angry and distances herself from him.

Meanwhile, Radhakrishnan and Tara fall in love. However, Nagabushnam intervenes — he warns Prema and forces Radhakrishnan and Tara to separate. Tara attempts suicide, but Krishna rescues her and promises to arrange her marriage with Radhakrishnan.

Krishna, determined to relieve Prema from her disability, enlists the help of his friend Rathnam and robs Nagabhushnam's house to fund her treatment. Nagabhushnam recognises him as his son Ramu and files a police complaint. Then, Prema regains her mobility and regrets her actions when she realises what Krishna has done. Krishna plans the marriage of Radhakrishnan and Tara. The police organise a dance performance by Prema, who agrees, on the condition that Nagabhushnam withdraws his case against Krishna.

Narayana Pillai, now a wanderer, also attends the performance. Krishna arrives in disguise. After the performance, Krishna successfully gets Radhakrishnan and Tara married, and then surrenders himself. Due to the tattoo on his arm, Krishna is recognised as Ramu. At last, Nagabhushnam apologises to Narayana Pillai and returns his property, which he gives to Ramu. Finally, the movie ends with the marriage of Ramu and Prema.

== Cast ==
- Gemini Ganesan as Ramakrishnan/Krishna
- Savitri as Prema
- K. Sarangapani as Rathnam
- V. K. Ramasamy as Nagabooshanam
- K. Balaji as Radhakrishnan
- T. P. Muthulakshmi as Thangam
- Girija as Tara
- M. G. Chakrapani as Inspector
- Jandhyala Gaurinatha Sastry as Zamindar Narayana Pillai
- Banerjee
- E. V. Saroja as dancer in the song "Enga Ooru Singappooru"
- K. Varalakshmi as Parvathi
- Sairam as Manager

== Soundtrack ==
Music composed by S. Rajeswara Rao. Lyrics were written by Thanjai N. Ramaiah Dass.

Song	Singers	Length
"Gumthala Gummaa Gumaaikkadhe"	Seerkazhi Govindarajan & Jikki	02:54
"Baaratha Naadu Jeya Baaratha Naadu"	P. Leela	03:17
"Avan Allaaal Puvi Mele Or Anuvum Asaiyaadhu"	P. B. Sreenivas	03:25
	Jikki & K. Rani	04:40
"Anaitthaalum Neeye Aditthaalum Neeye"	P. B. Sreenivas & P. Leela	03:51
"Penn Jenmam...Indha Pedhaiyin Vaazhnaallellaam"	P. Leela	05:16
"Kala Maayamayena Tala Vrata Idena"	P. Leela	03:10
"Muralidharaa Hare Mohanakrishnaa"	P. Leela	03:16
"Enga Ooru Singappooru Thillaale Lelo"	Jikki	03:08
"Oho Vennilaave Vinnaalum Vennilaave"	Ghantasala & P. Leela	03:03
"Oho Vennilaave Vinnaalum Vennilaave"	P. Leela	04:02
"Avanallal Puvi Meethu"	P. Susheela, P. B. Sreenivas	

== Reception ==
Kanthan of Kalki appreciated Savitri's performance, but felt Ganesan's performance was lacking in some scenes, and the songs were hindering the film's pace. He said the cinematography was flawless.
