= Anarkali (1955 film) =

1955 film by Vedantam Raghavaiah

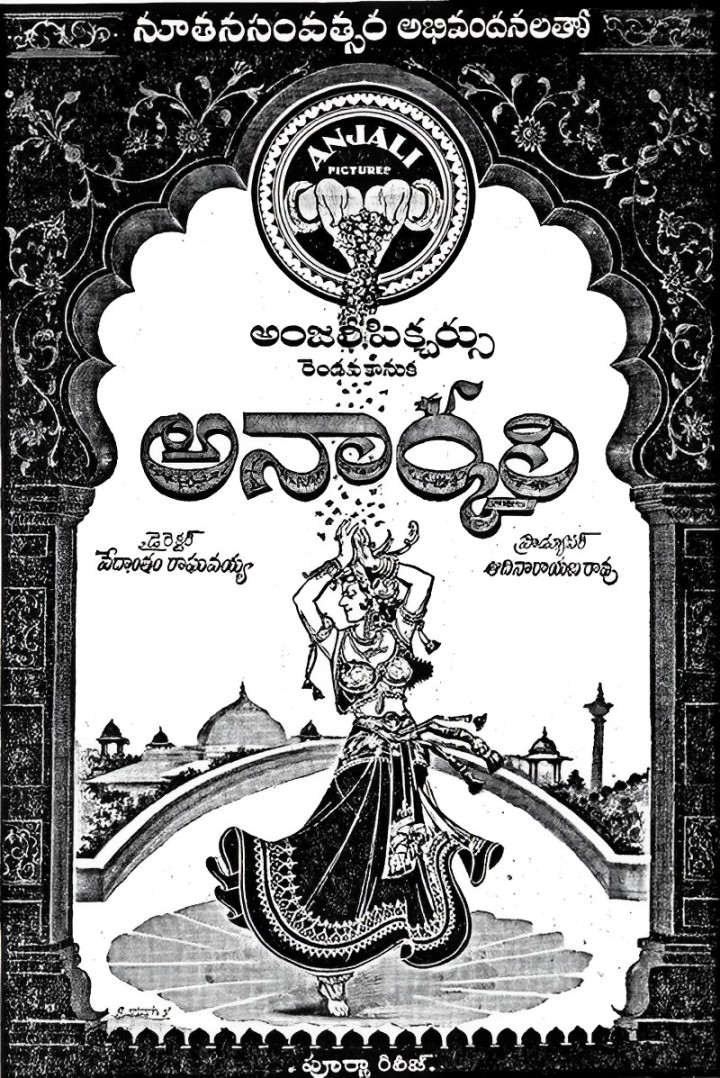
- Theatrical release poster
- Directed by: Vedantam Raghavayya
- Written by: Samudrala Sr. (dialogues)
- Screenplay by: Vedantam Raghavayya
- Produced by: P. Adinarayana Rao; Anjali Devi (presents)
- Starring: Anjali Devi; Akkineni Nageswara Rao
- Cinematography: Kamal Ghosh
- Edited by: N. S. Prakasam
- Music by: P. Adinarayana Rao
- Production company: Anjali Pictures
- Release date: 28 April 1955
- Running time: 153 minutes
- Country: India
- Language: Telugu

Anarkali (transl. Pomegranate blossom) is a 1955 Indian Telugu-language historical romance film, written and directed by Vedantam Raghavayya. The film stars Akkineni Nageswara Rao and Anjali Devi. It is based on the legend of the romance between Mughal prince Salim (later known as Jahangir) and the eponymous court dancer.

Anarkali was produced by P. Adinarayana Rao, who also composed the music. It was released on 28 April 1955 and became a commercial success, running for over 100 days in many theatres.

== Plot ==
Nadira, a Persian woman, migrates to Agra.

== Cast ==
- Anjali Devi as Anarkali
- Kannamba as Jodha Bai
- Nageswara Rao as Salim
- S. V. Ranga Rao as Akbar
- V. Nagayya as Man Singh
- S. Balasaraswathi as Gulnar
- Gadiraju Kesavarao as Tansen

== Production ==
After Paradesi (1953), the inaugural production of Anjali Pictures was an average success at the box office, its producers – husband and wife P. Adinarayana Rao and Anjali Devi – considered making their sophomore production based on folklore. The 1953 Hindi film Anarkali, which was based on the legendary romance between Mughal prince Salim (later known as Jahangir) and the eponymous court dancer, was a success and caught their attention, prompting them to adapt the same story in Telugu with the same title, while putting their folklore film plans on hold (this project would later be revived as Suvarna Sundari, released in 1957).

Vedantam Raghavayya was chosen as director and screenwriter, Samudrala Sr. as dialogue writer, Kamal Ghosh for cinematography, N. S. Prakasam for editing, and A. K. Sekhar as art director alongside Vali and Thota. Anjali Devi, besides presenting the film, also played the title character. Gadiraju Kesavarao, an associate director, also appeared briefly as the musician Tansen. Anarkali began production on 11 March 1954 at Neptune Studios. The outdoor scenes were shot at Mysore.

== Soundtrack ==
The soundtrack was composed by P. Adinarayana Rao, while the lyrics were written by Samudrala Sr. Though the soundtrack consisted predominantly of original compositions, two were borrowed from the 1953 film. "Ravoyi Sakhaa" was adapted from "Aa Jaane Wafaa", and "Jeevitame Saphalamu" was adapted from "Yeh Zindagi Usi Ki Hai".

Telugu
No.	Title	Singer(s)	Length
1.	"O Anaarkali"	Ghantasala	3:10
2.	"Jeevitame Saphalamu"	Jikki	6:06
3.	"Kalise Nelaraaju"	Ghantasala, Jikki	4:28
4.	"Nanu Kanugonuma"	Jikki	4:38
5.	"Rajasekhara"	Ghantasala, Jikki	6:24
6.	"Ninugaana Sambarana"	Jikki	4:15
7.	"Prema Janga"	Jikki	3:31
8.	"Anda Chandalugani"	P. Susheela	3:25
9.	"Anandame Andalu"	Jikki	4:08
10.	"Ravoyi Sakhaa"	Jikki	3:09
11.	"Kulasala Sarasala"	Jikki	3:23
12.	"O Sipaayi"	A. M. Rajah, Jikki	3:22
Total length:			49:59

Tamil songs

Lyrics were by Thanjai N. Ramaiah Dass.

Song	Singers	Length
"O Anaarkali Anaarkali Anaarkali"	Ghantasala	03:10
"Jeevitame Sabalamo"	Jikki	03:10
"Jeevitame Sabalamo"	Jikki	02:56
"Kanindha Alliyodu Nilavin Oli Nee"	Ghantasala, Jikki	04:28
"Naan Kannda Sugamaa Sugamaa Penn Pazhi"	Jikki	04:38
"Rajasekhara En Mel Modi Seiyyalaagumaa"	Ghantasala, Jikki	06:24
"Unaal Naanee Uyirai Marandhen"	Jikki	04:15
"Kaadhalin Jodi"	Jikki	03:31
"Andha Naal Thaanidhada"	P. Susheela	03:25
"Aanandham…. Naanum Kuditthen Ena Ninaikkudhu"	Jikki	04:08
"Sippaayi…. Anbe Nee Vaaraayo"	Jikki	03:09
"Paarthanile Mudivu Kannden En Vidhi"	Jikki	03:28

== Release and reception ==
Anarkali was released on 28 April 1955. The film was a commercial success, running for over 100 days in many theatres. Its namesake Tamil-dubbed version was also successful.
