= Chandipriya =

- Poster
- Directed by: V. Madhusudhana Rao
- Written by: Polkampalli Santha Devi (novel)
- Produced by: P. Adinarayana Rao
- Starring: Sobhan Babu, Jaya Prada & Chiranjeevi
- Edited by: D. Venkataratnam
- Music by: P. Adinarayana Rao
- Production company: Anjali Pictures
- Release date: 1980
- Country: India
- Language: Telugu

Chandipriya is a 1980 Telugu language film directed by V. Madhusudhana Rao starring Jaya Prada and Sobhan Babu. The film was based on the novel of the same name written by Polkampalli Santha Devi.

== Plot ==
Rich and arrogant Chandipriya rejects poor man Anil's love. Indranil, Anil's rich step-brother, intervenes and challenges Chandipriya that someday she would have to accept Anil's love for her.

== Cast ==
- Sobhan Babu as Indranil
- Jaya Prada as Chandipriya
- Anjali Devi as Saradamma
- Chiranjeevi as Anil Kumar
- Suvarna as Asha
- Gummadi as Prasada Rao
- Allu Ramalingaiah as Anand Rao
- P. L. Narayana as Gaali Subba Rao
- Potti Prasadas Avtharam
- S.V. Jagga Rao
- Girija as Singamma
- K.V. Lakshmi
- Madhumathi
- Vijayakala
- Swarna
- Kanta Rao as Guest Role
- Manju Bhargavi as Guest Role
- C.H. Narayana Rao as Seth (Guest Role)

== Soundtrack ==
Songs
No.	Title	Playback	Length
1.	"O Priya Priya"	S. P. Balasubrahmanyam, P. Susheela, S.P. Sailaja	4:05
2.	"E Vela Naina Oke Korika"	S. P. Balasubrahmanyam, P. Susheela	4:44
3.	"Sri Bhagyarekha...Janani Janani"	S. P. Balasubrahmanyam, P. Susheela	4:32
4.	"Yelo Elo Vala Pulo"	P. Susheela	4:38
