= Mahakavi Kshetrayya =

1976 film directed by C. S. Rao, Adurthi Subba Rao

- Theatrical release poster
- Directed by: Adurthi Subba Rao; C. S. Rao
- Written by: Arudra (dialogues)
- Screenplay by: C. S. Rao
- Based on: Life of Kshetrayya
- Produced by: P. Adinarayana Rao
- Starring: Akkineni Nageswara Rao; Anjali Devi; Manjula
- Cinematography: V. S. R. Swamy
- Edited by: Kotagiri Gopala Rao
- Music by: P. Adinarayana Rao
- Production company: Anjali Pictures
- Release date: 1976
- Running time: 172 mins
- Country: India
- Language: Telugu

Mahakavi Kshetrayya (transl. The great poet Kshetrayya) is a 1976 Telugu-language biographical film, based on the life of Kshetrayya, produced by P. Adinarayana Rao under the Anjali Pictures banner and directed by Adurthi Subba Rao & C. S. Rao. It stars Akkineni Nageswara Rao in the title role, with Anjali Devi, Manjula as female leads, and music also composed by P. Adinarayana Rao. Actually the film direction was started by veteran Adurthi Subba Rao but he had expired in the middle of the movie and director C. S. Rao completed the movie.

== Cast ==
- Akkineni Nageshwara Rao as Varadhayya
- Manjula as Bhama
- Anjali Devi as Rangajamma
- Kanta Rao as Vijaya Raghava Nayakudu
- Prabhakar Reddy as Golkonda Nawab Tanisha
- Dhulipala as Sivaiah
- Mukkamala
- Rao Gopal Rao as Tulasi Murthy
- Raja Babu as Pichaiah
- Giri Babu as Manaradeva
- Raavi Kondala Rao as Venkaiah
- P. J. Sharma as Siddhendra Yogi
- Sakshi Ranga Rao as Vikatakavi
- Mada as Wizard
- Gokina Rama Rao
- Hema Sundar
- Krishna Kumari as Vijaya Raghava Nayaka's wife
- Jayasudha as Taaramathi
- Prabha as Rukmini
- Hemalatha as Varadaiah's mother
- Radha Kumari as Sivaiah's wife
- Baby Rohini as Lord Krishna

== Soundtrack ==
Mahakavi Kshetrayya

Film score by P. Adinarayana Rao
- Released: 1976
- Genre: Soundtrack
- Label: EMI Columbia
- Producer: P. Adinarayana Rao

Music composed by P. Adinarayana Rao. Music released on EMI Columbia Audio Company.

S. No	Song title	Lyrics	Singers	length
1	"Aa Repalleloni Gopaludanta"	Aarudhra	V. Ramakrishna	3:54
2	"Jaabilli Choosenu"	Dasaradhi	V. Ramakrishna, P. Susheela	3:44
3	"Yendu Yendani"	Aarudhra	P. Susheela	
4	"Sreepathi"	Kshetrayya	V. Ramakrishna	1:49
5	"Eenllavale"	Kshetrayya	V. Ramakrishna	
6	"Andarine Movitanaya"	Kshetrayya	V. Ramakrishna	
7	"Iddari Sanduna"	Kshetrayya	V. Ramakrishna	
8	"Nazarana"	C. Narayana Reddy	P. Susheela	
9	"Yetuvanti Mohamogani"	Kshetrayya	V. Ramakrishna	
10	"Sri Manmahodeva"	Aarudhra	Pithapuram, P. Susheela, Anand	
11	"Vidajavru Gojjangi"	Kshetrayya	V. Ramakrishna	
12	"Challagaa Nelakonavaiah"	Aarudhra	V. Ramakrishna	2:04
13	"Muddhu Pettalaevuraa"	Kshetrayya	V. Ramakrishna	1:02
14	"Vadharaakapo"	Kshetrayya	V. Ramakrishna	2:36
15	"Aa Poddu Ee Poddu"	C. Narayana Reddy	S. P. Balasubrahmanyam, P. Susheela	
16	"Meluko Kaviraja"	C. Narayana Reddy	S. P. Balasubrahmanyam	7:11
17	"Ashta Vidhanayaka Lakhnamulu"	C. Narayana Reddy	S. P. Balasubrahmanyam, P. Susheela	

== Awards ==
- The film won Nandi Award for Second Best Feature Film - Silver - P. Adinarayana Rao (1976)
