= Chiranjeevulu (1956 film) =

1956 film by Vedantam Raghavayya

- Theatrical release poster
- Directed by: Vedantam Raghavayya
- Screenplay by: Vedantam Raghavayya
- Produced by: D. L. Narayana
- Starring: N. T. Rama Rao; Jamuna
- Cinematography: V. N. Reddy
- Edited by: R. Hanumantha Rao
- Music by: Ghantasala
- Production company: Vinoda Productions
- Release date: 15 August 1956
- Running time: 166 minutes
- Country: India
- Language: Telugu

Chiranjeevulu (transl. Immortals) is a 1956 Indian Telugu-language romantic drama film, produced by D. L. Narayana under Vinoda Productions banner and directed by Vedantam Raghavayya. It is a partial remake of the Hindi film Mela (1948). The film stars N. T. Rama Rao and Jamuna, with music composed by Ghantasala. It was released on 15 August 1956 and became a commercial success.

== Cast ==
- N. T. Rama Rao as Mohan
- Jamuna as Sarada
- Gummadi as Krishna
- C. S. R. Anjaneyulu as Rayudu
- B. Narasimha Rao as Ramadasu
- Peketi Sivaram as Ratnam
- Balakrishna as Satyam
- Suryakantham as Akhilandamma
- Chhaya Devi as Govindamma
- Surabhi Balasaraswati as Janaki
- Mahankali Venkayya
- Allu Ramalingam

== Production ==
Chiranjeevulu was directed by Vedantam Raghavayya and produced by D. L. Narayana under Vinoda Productions. It was remade from the Hindi film Mela (1948), but Raghavayya, Narayana, and dialogue writer Malladi Ramakrishna Sastry made substantial changes to the screenplay, one of them being the male lead going blind, which did not happen in the Hindi original. While the female lead in Mela is unable to marry the male lead and instead is forced to marry a much older widower who has children, the female lead in Chiranjeevulu marries a "young eligible bachelor". N. T. Rama Rao was chosen to play the male lead Mohan, reprising the role originally played by Dilip Kumar. He wore contact lenses to portray his character when blind. The scene where a blind Mohan attempts suicide by walking into the way of an incoming train and is saved by the doctor Krishna was shot at Chengalpattu junction railway station. While filming this scene, Gummadi, who played Krishna, fell but managed to get up and to push an oblivious Rama Rao out of the train's way. It was not written in the script that Krishna had to fall, but the filmed scene was retained. Jamuna played the female Sarada, portrayed by Nargis in Mela where the character was known as Manju. Chiranjeevulu was her first film with Raghavayya, who would frequently help correct her acting over the course of the film's production. Cinematography was handled by V. N. Reddy, and the editing by R. Hanumantha Rao. Principal photography took place primarily at Revathy Studios, Madras.

== Soundtrack ==
The soundtrack was composed by Ghantasala, and the lyrics were written by Malladi Ramakrishna Sastry. The songs "Thellavaaraga Vachhe", "Kanupaapa Karuvaina Kanulenduko" and "Yendaka Yendaka" attained popularity.

Song title	Singers
"Raamanamanu Mitaayi"	Madhavapeddi Satyam
"Tinendukunnaayiraa Konendukunnaayiraa"	K. Jamuna Rani, K. Rani
"Alavaari Abbayi, Yenchakka Yenchakka Yenchakka"	P. Leela, Ghantasala
"Manasaina Pata Marani Pata Vinipinchenu"	P. Leela, Ghantasala
"Manasaina Pata Marani Pata Vinipinchenu" (male)	Ghantasala
"Marani Prema Mallelamala Edurayyenoo" (Part 1)	P. Leela, Ghantasala
"Marani Prema Mallelamala Edurayyenoo" (Part 2)	P. Leela, Ghantasala
"Marani Prema Mallelamala Edurayyenoo" (female, Part 1)	P. Leela
"Marani Prema Mallelamala Edurayyenoo" (female, Part 2)	P. Leela
"Allavade Repallevade Allibilli Pillanagrovi Paatagade"	P. Leela, Ghantasala Venkateswara Rao, Chorus
"Chikilinta Chiguru Sampangi Guburu Chinadaani"	P. Leela, Ghantasala
"Endaka Endaka Endaka Andaka Andaka Andaka"	P. Leela, Ghantasala
"Yenaatikainaa Nee Danane Enaatikaina Needanane"	P. Leela
"Manasu Needhe Mamata Nadhe Nadhanave Ne Neevaadane"	Ghantasala
"Migilindi Nena Brathukindukena Maracheva Yedabaasi"	Ghantasala
"Tellavara Vacche Teliyaka Naa Saami"	P. Leela
"Kanupaapa Karavaina Kanulenduku Tanavare Parulaina"	P. Leela, Ghantasala
"Sukumara Hridayala Vedanaku Santi"	Ghantasala
"Chivurula Needala Chirunavvu Taanai Virisina"	Ghantasala

== Release and reception ==
Chiranjeevulu was released on 15 August 1956 and became a commercial success. The film was dubbed in Tamil as Amarageetham.
