= Bhakta Tukaram =

- Theatrical release poster
- Directed by: V. Madhusudhana Rao
- Written by: Veeturi (dialogues)
- Screenplay by: V. Madhusudhana Rao
- Produced by: P. Adinarayana Rao
- Starring: Akkineni Nageswara Rao; Anjali Devi; Sivaji Ganesan
- Cinematography: V. S. R. Swamy
- Edited by: N. S. Prakasam
- Music by: P. Adinarayana Rao
- Production company: Anjali Pictures
- Distributed by: Lakshmi Films
- Release date: 5 July 1973
- Running time: 166 mins
- Country: India
- Language: Telugu

Bhakta Tukaram (lit. 'Devotee Tukaram') is a 1973 Indian Telugu-language biographical film based on the life of the saint-poet Tukaram, produced by P. Adinarayana Rao under the Anjali Pictures banner and directed by V. Madhusudhana Rao. It stars Akkineni Nageswara Rao, Anjali Devi and Sivaji Ganesan, with music also composed by Adinarayana Rao.

== Cast ==
- Akkineni Nageswara Rao as Tukaram
- Anjali Devi as Avali Bai
- Sivaji Ganesan as Chhatrapati Shivaji Maharaj
- Nagabhushanam as Mumbaji Goswamy
- Dhulipala as Rameswara Bhatta
- Sakshi Ranga Rao as Nandi
- Bhanu Prakash as Neeloji
- Nagaraju as Lord Panduranga
- P. J. Sarma as Gangadhar Pandit
- Potti Prasad as Varaham
- Kanchana as Bahina Bai
- Sriranjani Jr. as Rukma Bai
- Baby Sridevi as Kaasi (Tukaram's daughter)
- Baby Rani

== Production ==
Akkineni Nageswara Rao played Tukaram, and Sivaji Ganesan played Shivaji without taking any remuneration for the film.

== Soundtrack ==
Music composed by P. Adinarayana Rao.

S. No	Song title	Lyrics	Singers	length
1	"Ghana Ghana Sundaraa"	Devulapalli	Ghantasala	5:26
2	"Bhale Bhale Andalu"	Veeturi	Ghantasala	3:42
3	"Chindulu Veyakura"	Veeturi	Ghantasala,	2:59
4	"Dhanyalakshmi"	Veeturi	P. Susheela	2:49
5	"Kaliyugam Kaliyugam"	Dasaradhi	S. P. Balasubrahmanyam	3:37
6	"Karunamaya Deva"	Dasaradhi	V. Ramakrishna	5:18
7	"Kesava Madhava"	Veeturi	Ghantasala	1:02
8	"Manasuna Neeve"	Dasaradhi	V. Ramakrishna	2:58
9	"Neeve Aadi Daivamu"	Dasaradhi	V. Ramakrishna	1:49
10	"Panduranga Naamam"	Veeturi	V. Ramakrishna	4:13
11	"Naa Pilupu Vinagaleva"	Dasaradhi	V. Ramakrishna	3:08
12	"Poojaku Veleyara"	C. Narayana Reddy	Ghantasala, P. Susheela	6:37
13	"Sari Sari Vagalu"	C. Narayana Reddy	P. Susheela	4:02
14	"Shyama Sundara"-I	Dasaradhi	V. Ramakrishna	6:19
15	"Shyama Sundara"-II	Dasaradhi	P. Susheela	0:46
16	"Unnavaa Asalunnavaa"	Dasaradhi	Ghantasala	3:16
17	"Padavelli Potondira"	Dasaradhi	V. Ramakrishna	2:56
