= Tilottama (1951 film) =

- Theatrical release poster
- Directed by: Raja Saheb of Mirzapur
- Written by: Tapi Dharma Rao (dialogues)
- Screenplay by: Ch. Narayana Murthy
- Story by: Ch. Narayana Murthy
- Produced by: Raja Saheb of Mirzapur
- Starring: Akkineni Nageswara Rao; Anjali Devi
- Cinematography: D. L. Naryana
- Edited by: Ch Narayana Murthy
- Music by: P. Adinarayana Rao
- Production company: Sobhanachala Pictures
- Release dates: 16 February 1951 (Telugu); 16 March 1951 (Tamil)
- Country: India
- Language: Telugu

Tilottama is a 1951 Indian swashbuckling adventure fantasy film, produced and directed by Raja Saheb of Mirzapur under the Sobhanachala Pictures banner. It stars Akkineni Nageswara Rao and Anjali Devi, with music composed by P. Adinarayana Rao. The film was simultaneously shot in Telugu and Tamil, with the latter being titled Mayamalai (transl. Mystic Chain). Tilottama was a box-office disaster.

== Cast ==
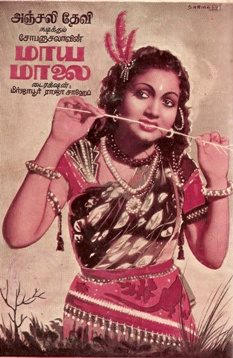
Poster of Tamil version

Telugu version

- Akkineni Nageswara Rao as Deva Dattudu
- Anjali Devi as Tilottama
- A. V. Subba Rao as Vijaya Simha
- M. C. Raghavan as Haridasu
- Sadasiva Rao as Chandrakanth
- M. Kondayya as Ganapathi
- K. V. Subba Rao as Setty
- Sundara Rao as Soorasena
- Ram Murthy as Venkatesam
- Aadi Seshayya as Mantri
- Babji as Lambu
- Eemaan as Jambu
- Kishan as Pingalla
- P. M. Naidu as Adhikaari
- Suryaprabha as Vasantha Sena
- Vijayalakshmi as Chaarulata
- Kanaakam as Maalathi
- Vaanilakshmi as Manjari
- Gangaratnam as Setty's wife
- Chitti as Hema
- Shanta as Sarala
- Pushpalata as Vakula
- Saroja as Goddess Kali

Tamil version

List adapted from the database of Film News Anandan.

Male cast

- A. Nageswara Rao
- M. V. Mani
- C. S. D. Singh
- Sayeeram

Female cast

- Anjali Devi
- Menaka
- Suryaprabha
- Kanagam

== Soundtrack ==
Music was composed by P. Adinarayana Rao. Lyrics were written by Tapi Dharma Rao.

Telugu version

Song title	Singers
"Sobhanagiri Nilaya"	
"Valapularaju Yeedi"	
"Puthutalaikham"	
"Aakasamantha"	
"Manasulu Kalasi"	
"Sundara Nandakumara"	
"Leevidi Leevidi"	
"Darisanameeya Raava"	
"Deva Deva"	
"Preme Paramani"	
"Dhaname Punyam"	
"Sadhuseyakandi"	
"Kaavava Deva!"	
"Oo Landakaari Bangaru Bomma"	
"Kaaruchikatlalo"	
"Jaya Jaya Janani Jagadamba"	

Tamil version

The lyrics were penned by Papanasam Sivan, Rajagopala Iyer and Narasimhan.

Song	Singer/s	Lyricist
"Sobana Giri Nilaiya Dhayaaman"		
"Mana Mohanaangkiye"		Narasimhan
"Endhan Manam Polave"		Narasimhan
"Poothu Thazhaikkum Poongkaavum"		
"Kaadhalukinaiyo Ulaga Saamraajyam"		
"Nin Thiru Malaradi Naan Maraven"		Papanasam Sivan
"Dharisanam Tharuvaayo"		Papanasam Sivan
"Manamarindhor Pizhai Seikilaen"		Papanasam Sivan
"Parithaabam Agalaadha Jagath Padhiye"		Papanasam Sivan
"Thoththu Ponaayaa Thoo Thoththu Ponaayaa"		Rajagopala Iyer
"Koodiye Koodiye Koottam Thaanaaga"		Rajagopala Iyer
"Paarka Paarka Azhagaana Penne"		Rajagopala Iyer
