= Palletoori Pilla =

- Theatrical release poster
- Directed by: B. A. Subba Rao
- Written by: Tapi Dharma Rao (dialogues)
- Screenplay by: B. A. Subba Rao
- Story by: B. A. Subba Rao; Tapi Dharma Rao; P. Adinarayana Rao
- Produced by: B. A. Subba Rao; Raja Saheb of Mirzapuram(Presents)
- Starring: Akkineni Nageswara Rao; N. T. Rama Rao; Anjali Devi
- Cinematography: D. S. Kotnis
- Edited by: K. A. Sreeramulu
- Music by: P. Adinarayana Rao
- Production companies: Sobhanachala & B. A. Subba Rao Joint Productions
- Distributed by: Poorna films
- Release date: 27 April 1950
- Running time: 176 minutes
- Country: India
- Language: Telugu

Palletoori Pilla (transl. Village Girl) is a 1950 Indian Telugu-language film produced and directed by B. A. Subba Rao under the Sobhanachala & B. A. Subba Rao Joint Productions banner. It stars N. T. Rama Rao, Akkineni Nageswara Rao and Anjali Devi, with music composed by P. Adinarayana Rao. The film was loosely based on the English play Pizaro by Richard Brinsley Sheridan.

Palletoori Pilla was the first lead role for Rama Rao who had earlier acted in a minor role in Mana Desam (1949). It was blockbuster and was the highest grossing Telugu film of the year, and both Subba Rao and Rama Rao gained a good reputation from it. The film also marks the first collaboration between Nageswara Rao and Rama Rao who further acted in 14 films together thereafter.

The film was dubbed into Tamil as Grama Penn which became a hit. It was later remade in Hindi as Insaniyat (1955).

== Plot ==
Santha is a beautiful village girl.

== Cast ==
Cast according to the song book

Male Cast

- N. T. Rama Rao as Jayanth
- Nageswara Rao as Vasanth
- A. V. Subba Rao as Kampana Dora
- S. V. Ranga Rao as Dhathra
- Kona prabhakara rao as Marthand
- Ramamurthi as Lapam
- Sethuramaiah as Dapam
- Kadapalli Ramayya as Purandarayya

Female Cast

- Anjali Devi as Santha
- Lakshmikanta as Rajini
- Bala Saraswathi as Sambha
- Baby Mallika as Sasi
- Hemalatha as Vasanth's Mother
- Kanakam
- Seetha

== Soundtrack ==
Music composed by P. Adinarayana Rao. Music released on Audio Company.

Song title	Lyrics	Singers	length
"Mahatma"	Tapi Dharma Rao	Ghantasala	1:35
"Premamaya"	Tapi Dharma Rao	Pithapuram	2:51
"Shantavanti Pilla"	Tapi Dharma Rao	Ghantasala	2:49
"Dheerakampana"	P. Adinarayana Rao	Jikki	2:42
"Vaddura Baboi"	Tapi Dharma Rao	Pithapuram	2:51
"Chinnari Papayi"	Tapi Dharma Rao	Jikki	3:05
"Vuntenemi"	Tapi Dharma Rao	Jikki	2:26
"Chitapata Chinukulu"	Tapi Dharma Rao	Pithapuram, Jikki	2:08
"Palleseemala Bratuke"	Tapi Dharma Rao	Jikki	2:58

== Production ==
Palletoori Pilla marked the first on-screen collaboration between N. T. Rama Rao and Akkineni Nageswara Rao. Initially, Kalyanam Raghuramayya was cast in the lead role, but he was later replaced by Nageswara Rao. While this film was the first to be shot with N. T. Rama Rao in a lead role, his second film, Shavukaru (1950), was released before Palletoori Pilla.

During filming, Rama Rao performed his own stunts, notably in an action sequence involving a bull. Although the director advised using a stunt double, he insisted on doing the scene himself. Rama Rao was instructed to only catch the bull's horns, but he fully engaged in the fight, resulting in a fall that fractured his right hand. Despite sustaining two fractures, he continued shooting the next day, covering his bandages with full sleeves.

== Box office ==
The film ran for more than 100 days in 7 centres in Andhra Pradesh.

== Bibliography ==
- Naati 101 Chitralu (Telugu hit films released between 1931 and 1965), S. V. Rama Rao, Kinnera Publications, Hyderabad, 2006, pages: 52–3.
