= Mangaiyar Ullam Mangatha Selvam =

- Poster
- Directed by: Vedantam Raghavayya
- Screenplay by: Thanjai N. Ramaiah Dass
- Story by: Adityan; Ramakrishna Sastri
- Produced by: P. Adinarayana Rao
- Starring: Gemini Ganesan; Anjali Devi
- Music by: P. Adinarayana Rao
- Production company: Anjali Pictures
- Release date: 31 August 1962
- Running time: 2:56:41
- Country: India
- Language: Tamil

Mangaiyar Ullam Mangatha Selvam (transl. A woman's heart is an non-diminishing wealth) is a 1962 Indian Tamil-language film directed by Vedantam Raghavayya. The film stars Gemini Ganesan and Anjali Devi. It was released on 31 August 1962.

== Cast ==
This list is adapted from the book Thiraikalanjiyam Part-2.

Male cast

- Gemini Ganesan
- M. R. Radha
- Nagayya
- Nagesh
- S. Rama Rao

Male cast (Contd.)

- Mahalingam
- Subramaniam
- Ramachandra Rao
- Satyam

Female cast

- Anjali Devi
- P. Kannamba
- Jayanthi
- Meenakumari
- Maheswari

== Production ==
The film was produced by P. Adinarayana Rao, who also scored the music, under the banner Anjali Pictures. Vedantam Raghavayya who is also a choreographer, directed the film. The film was made in Telugu with the title Swarna Manjari. N. T. Rama Rao replaced Gemini Ganesan as the hero. Thanjai N. Ramaiah Dass wrote the dialogues for the Tamil version of the film.

== Soundtrack ==
Music was composed by P. Adinarayana Rao.

Song	Singer/s	Lyricist	Length
"Mangaadha Pirai Soodum Gangaadharaa...Jal Jal Sathangai"	Ghantasala & Susheela	Thanjai N. Ramaiah Dass	02:41
"Vaazhga Needooli Mannavaa"	P. Susheela & Nagayya	Thanjai N. Ramaiah Dass	06:20
"Kalaiye Jegam Pugazh Jeeva Kalaiye"	Ghantasala	Thanjai N. Ramaiah Dass	
"Indha Vaalibamum Vaanavillu"	S. Janaki	Thanjai N. Ramaiah Dass	02:34
"Sollaamale Sollavaa Indru Sudhanthira Naalallavaa"	S. Janaki	Thanjai N. Ramaiah Dass	
"Arugil Vaa Vaa Enaik Kaavaa"	P. Susheela	Thanjai N. Ramaiah Dass	01:03
"Idhuve Vaazhvil Aanandhame"	P. Susheela & P. B. Srinivas	Thanjai N. Ramaiah Dass	03:31
"Yenoh Yenoh En Naalum Illaa Aanandame"	P. Susheela, S. Janaki & P. B. Srinivas	Thanjai N. Ramaiah Dass	
"Mangala Medai Maalai Selvam"	P. Susheela & S. Janaki	Kannadasan	01:20
"Ammaa...Seyyaadha Paavam Soozhndhathe"	T. M. Soundararajan	Kannadasan	

== Release and reception ==
Mangaiyar Ullam Mangatha Selvam was released on 31 August 1962. On the same day, The Indian Express wrote, "Unimaginatively contrived, the film is vivid and artistic, without being precise. Its pictorial imagery falls to blend with the story content, which is thin and far in excess of the usual padding and synthetic thrills."

== Bibliography ==
- Rajadhyaksha, Ashish; Willemen, Paul (1998) [1994]. Encyclopaedia of Indian Cinema. British Film Institute and Oxford University Press. ISBN 0-19-563579-5.
