= Bala Nagamma (1959 film) =

1959 film directed by Vedantam Raghavaiah

- Theatrical release poster
- Directed by: Vedantam Raghavayya
- Screenplay by: Vedantam Raghavayya
- Story by: Samudrala Jr.
- Produced by: B. S. Raju; D. S. Raju; P. Venkatapathi Raju
- Starring: N. T. Rama Rao; Anjali Devi; S. V. Ranga Rao
- Cinematography: C. Nageswara Rao
- Edited by: N. S. Prakash
- Music by: T. V. Raju
- Production company: Sri Venkata Ramana Pictures
- Release date: 9 October 1959
- Running time: 182 minutes
- Country: India
- Language: Telugu

Bala Nagamma is a 1959 Indian Telugu-language fantasy swashbuckler film directed by Vedantam Raghavayya. The film stars N. T. Rama Rao, Anjali Devi, and S. V. Ranga Rao with music composed by T. V. Raju. It is a remake of the 1942 Telugu film of the same name.

== Plot ==
The film begins with Queen Bhulakshmi, wife of King Nava Bhoja, who prays to Shiva for progeny. Ultimately, she acquires the boon, and according to the Lord's mandate, she procures a fruit from the tree by stepping on an anthill. At this, enraged Nagendra is about to kill her, but she begs for life until her motherhood. After a while, Bhulakshmi is blessed with seven daughters and decides to repent. Anyhow, Nava Bhoja bars and attempts to shield her but gets a victim of a snake bite and dies. Now, the King coercively knits a shrew, Manikyamba, who oppress the kids. Plus, she molds Nava Bhoja, a henpecked husband, via a witchcraft paste and goads him to slaughter the girls. Generous father cannot do it, so he banishes them in the forest, where the Bhulakshmi aura rears them.

Years pass, and King Ramavardhi, the ruler of Panuganti, is the sibling of Bhulakshmi, who sends his seven sons to detect his niece. Whereat, the younger Karyavardhi, spots the last girl, Balanagamma, and they fall in love. Now, the seven sisters' splices, their cousins, Karyavardhi & Balanagamma, are blessed with a baby boy, Balavardhi. Besides, Mayala Marathi, the splenetic wizard, resides on the outskirts of his ghost den. Once, he challenges his paramour Sangu to nab a gorgeous in the universe and picks Balanagamma. At the same time, Karyavardhi proceeds to the battlefield, drawing a chalk outline for protection and designating his acolyte, Thalari Ramudu, as a guard. However, Marathi's chicanery abducts Balanagamma by transforming her into a dog. Knowing it, Karyavardhi onslaughts with his men on Marathi, whom he turns as the status and even incinerates Sangu. Spotting it, Balanagamma attempts suicide, and Bhulakshmi's aura secures her, stating that her son will safeguard her at the age of 12. Hereupon, Balanagamma tactically resisted Marathi for 12 years.

As time passes, Balavardhi learns about Marathi's atrocity. Ergo pledges to relieve his parents and steps in with Thalari Ramudu. Amid this, he shields a kingdom from a tiger hunt and marries its princess. Following, seeking guidance from Nagendra, Balavardhi intrudes into Marathi's palace through a florist, Tambala Pedi. He is acquainted with his mother and, with wit, extracts the life secret of Marathi, i.e., amalgamated beyond the seven seas; one pillar is the floor and in the parrot's neck. Balavardhi acquires it after an adventurous journey. At last, he ceases Marathi, making his father & family normal. Finally, the movie ends on a happy note with a family reunion.

== Cast ==
- N. T. Rama Rao as Karyavardhi
- Anjali Devi as Bala Nagamma
- S. V. Ranga Rao as Mayala Marathi
- Relangi as Thalari Ramudu
- C. S. R. as Navabhoja Raju
- Chadalavada as Tippadu
- A. V. Subba Rao as Ramavardhi
- Finley Whisby as Mihir Oktav
- Lanka Satyam as Puliraju
- Raja Sulochana as Sangu
- Hemalatha as Bhulakshmi Devi
- Suryakala as Manikyala Devi
- Master Satyanarayana as Balavardhi

== Production ==
Bala Nagamma was remade from the 1942 film of the same name. Relangi and Lanka Satyam, who appeared in the 1942 film, returned in the remake.

== Soundtrack ==
Bala Nagamma

Film score by T. V. Raju
- Released: 1959
- Genre: Soundtrack
- Length: 32:30
- Producer: T. V. Raju

Telugu Songs

The soundtrack of the film was composed by T. V. Raju, while the lyrics were written by Samudrala Jr.

Playback singers are Ghantasala, Pithapuram Nageswara Rao, P. Leela, Jikki, P. Susheela, S. Janaki and K. Rani.

S. No.	Song title	Singer/s	Lyricist	length
1	"Jayamu Jayamu Venkataramana"	Ghantasala	Samudrala Jr	1:12
2	"Jaya Jaya Girijaaramana"	P. Leela	Samudrala Jr	3:12
3	"Laali Laali"	P. Leela	Samudrala Jr	2:47
4	"Yentho Yentho Vinthale"	S. Janaki & K. Rani	Samudrala Jr	2:51
5	"Virisindi Vintha Haayi"	Ghantasala & Jikki	Samudrala Jr	2:58
6	"Andamu Anadamu"	P. Susheela	Samudrala Jr	3:41
7	"Jo Jo Raja"	P. Susheela	Samudrala Jr	3:32
8	"Intiloni Pooru Inthintha"	Pithapuram Nageswara Rao	Samudrala Jr	3:06
9	"Yetuluntio Babu"	P. Susheela	Samudrala Jr	3:23
10	"Neekelaraa Ee Vedana"	P. Susheela	Samudrala Jr	3:15
11	"Appudu Ne Thippadandi"	Pithapuram Nageswara Rao	Samudrala Jr	2:33
12	"Anilo Vairula Dorbalambanachi"	Ghantasala	Samudrala Jr	
13	"Bale bale Phalarasam"	Ghantasala	Samudrala Jr	

Tamil Songs

Music by Pamarthi. Lyrics by Kuyilan and Kambadasan.

Song	Singer/s	Lyricist	Duration (m:ss)
"Bale Bale Palarasam"	Dr. Sirkazhi S. Govindarajan		3:16
"Jaya Jaya Girijaa Ramanaa"	P. Leela		03:12
"Thaale Laale En Premai"	P. Leela		02:47
"Thaalo Thaalo Oonjale"	K. Rani & P. Leela		02:51
"Viraigindra Vennilaavey"	Ghantasala & Jikki	Kuyilan	02:58
	P. Susheela		03:41
"Aararo Ennaasai Raajaa"	R. Balasaraswathi Devi		03:16
			03:06
"Irul Neengumo Baabu"	P. Susheela		03:23
"Nee Kelaiyaa"	P. Susheela		03:15
			02:33

== Reception ==
The Indian Express in its review dated 11 March 1960 reviewing the Tamil-dubbed version noted the theme "will not be without fascination for our Tamil folk on account of the touch of the super-natural dominating the theme" but praised S. V. Ranga Rao as "providing major attraction".
