= Maathu Tappada Maga =

- DVD cover
- Directed by: Peketi Sivaram
- Written by: Peketi Sivaram
- Screenplay by: Peketi Sivaram
- Produced by: R. Bhagawan; K. R. Balani; S. Thyagarajan
- Starring: Anant Nag; Sharada; Aarathi; Rajinikanth; Dwarakish
- Cinematography: J. Sathyanarayana
- Edited by: Kotagiri Gopala Rao
- Music by: Ilaiyaraaja
- Production company: Bharatha Cine Arts
- Release date: 31 March 1978
- Running time: 138 minutes
- Country: India
- Language: Kannada

Maathu Tappada Maga is a 1978 Indian Kannada-language film written and directed by Peketi Sivaram. The film stars Anant Nag, Aarathi, Sharada and Rajinikanth in his 25th film appearance. Udaykumar, K. S. Ashwath, Narasimharaju and T. N. Balakrishna feature in supporting roles.

== Cast ==
- Anant Nag as Kumar
- Aarathi as Revathi
- Sharada as Latha
- Rajinikanth as Chandru
- K. S. Ashwath as Jagapathi Rao
- Leelavathi as Parvati
- Dwarakish as Mohan
- Udaykumar as diamonds smuggler and Chandru's boss
- Narasimharaju as Gangappa
- T. N. Balakrishna as Rachappa
- Bangalore Nagesh
- Peketi Sivaram
- M. N. Lakshmi Devi as Rachappa's wife
- Papamma as Lakshmi
- Vijayageetha
- Susheela Naidu
- Roopashree
- Jayalakshmi
- Halam as dancer
- Y. R. Ashwath Narayan
- Tomato Somu
- Kunigal Ramanath

== Soundtrack ==
Ilaiyaraaja composed the music for the film's soundtrack in his Kannada debut, with lyrics written by R. N. Jayagopal. The soundtrack album consists of four tracks. Ilayaraja later reused the song "Bhanu Bhoomiya" as "Edho Ninaivugal" for the Tamil film Agal Vilakku (1979).

Track listing
| No. | Title | Singer(s) | Length |
|---|---|---|---|
| 1. | "Entha Soundarya Nodu" | S. P. Balasubrahmanyam | 4:32 |
| 2. | "Heloru Keloru" | S. Janaki | 4:12 |
| 3. | "Baanu Bhoomiya" | S. P. Balasubrahmanyam, S. Janaki | 4:05 |
| 4. | "Mareyada Harashada" | P. Susheela | 3:27 |
| Total length: | | | 16:16 |
