= Kalyana Mandapam =

- Theatrical release poster
- Directed by: V. Madhusudhana Rao
- Based on: Gejje Pooje (1969) by Puttanna Kanagal
- Produced by: V. Madhusudhana Rao
- Starring: Sobhan Babu; Kanchana; Jaggayya; Anjali Devi; Gummadi
- Cinematography: S. Venkatarathnam
- Music by: P. Adinarayana Rao
- Production company: Anjali Pictures
- Release date: 1971
- Country: India
- Language: Telugu

Kalyana Mandapam (transl. Wedding Hall) is a 1971 Indian Telugu-language film produced and directed by V. Madhusudhana Rao. A remake of Puttanna Kanagal's Gejje Pooje (1969), the film stars Sobhan Babu and Kanchana; Jaggayya, Anjali Devi, and Gummadi play key supporting roles. P. Adinarayana Rao composed the film's soundtrack and score, and S. Venkatarathnam handled the cinematography. The film was a commercial success, completing a 100-day run.

== Plot ==
Annapurna, a devadasi, aspires to lead a normal married life. (Note: In South India, a devadasi was a woman who was dedicated to worship and serve a deity or a temple for the rest of her life.) She falls in love with Chandrasekhar, a musician, and begets a child named Chandramukhi. As Chandrasekhar fails to return to her, Annapurna is pressured by her mother Ranganayaki to be a rich man's mistress. Annapurna accepts, and aims to help Chandramukhi lead a respectable married life when she grows up. The rich man moves Annapurna's family to Rajahmundry, where Chandramukhi meets Avadhani, a scholar with a progressive outlook. She considers him her master, and befriends his children Ramu and Lalitha.

Fifteen years later, Ramu promises to marry Chandramukhi. One day, Chandrasekhar, who happens to be Avadhani's childhood friend, comes to meet him and ends up visiting Annapurna's place that night. He explains to her the circumstance that led him to marry another woman. While Chandramukhi is happy to find her father, Chandrasekhar requests her not to let out the secret that he is her biological father. Seeing Chandramukhi with Chandrasekhar from his window, not knowing that he is her biological father, Ramu misunderstands her and agrees to marry the latter's daughter, whoi happens to be his legal heir. Chandramukhi accepts her fate, and agrees to be initiated into the family tradition of being a devadasi. Later, she kills herself at a temple by swallowing the diamond in the ring gifted by Chandrasekhar.

== Cast ==
- Sobhan Babu as Ramu
- Adinarayana as young Ramu
- Kanchana as Chandramukhi
- Sridevi as young Chandramukhi
- Jaggayya as Avadhani
- Anjali Devi as Annapurna
- Gummadi as Chandrasekhar
- Ramaprabha as Savitri
- Nagabhushanam as Savitri's husband
- Pandari Bai as Avadhani's wife
- Annapoornamma as Ranganayakamma
- Sandhyarani as Lalitha
- Brahmaji as young Lalitha

== Soundtrack ==
- "Chukkalu Pade Subha Mantram" (Lyrics: Devulapalli Krishnasastri) -
- "Piliche Varunte Palikenu Nenu" -
- "Sarigama Padanisa Nidapa Magarisa Ani Palikevarunte" (Lyrics: Devulapalli Krishnasastri) -
