= Mayalamari =

- Theatrical release poster
- Directed by: P. Sridhar
- Written by: Tapi Dharma Rao (dialogues)
- Produced by: A. N. R. Gopala Krishnan
- Starring: Akkineni Nageswara Rao; Anjali Devi
- Cinematography: B. S. Ranga
- Edited by: R. M. Venu Gopal
- Music by: P. Adinarayana Rao
- Production company: Aswini Pictures
- Release date: 14 June 1951
- Running time: 151 minutes
- Country: India
- Languages: Telugu; Tamil

Mayalamari (transl. Wizard) is a 1951 Indian Telugu-language fantasy adventure film, produced by A.N.R.Gopala Krishnan under the Aswini Pictures banner and directed by P. Sridhar. It stars Akkineni Nageswara Rao and Anjali Devi, with music composed by P. Adinarayana Rao. The film was simultaneously released in Tamil as Maayakkari (1951).

== Cast ==
Cast of Mayalamari:

Male cast

- Akkineni Nageswara Rao as Pratap
- Mukkamala as Bhaskar Varma
- Raja Reddy as Gandara Ganda
- Gaadepalli as Maharaju
- Shiva Rao
- Vangara as a member of the Bhagavatam Troop
- Nalla Rammurthy as a member of the Bhagavatam Troop

Female cast

- Anjali Devi as Indumathi
- C.Lakshmi Rajyam as Maayalamaari
- Surabhi Balasaraswathi as Kuranji
- Annapurna as Maharani
- Malati

== Soundtrack ==
Music composed by P. Adinarayana Rao for both Telugu and Tamil versions.

Telugu

Lyrics were written by Tapi Dharma Rao, P. Adinarayana Rao.

Song title	Singers	length
"O Paradesi"	Jikki	2:09
"Koyila Koose"	Pithapuram Nageswara Rao & R. Balasaraswathi Devi	3:24
"Ledemo Ledemo"	Pithapuram Nageswara Rao & R. Balasaraswathi Devi	3:18
"Miyav Miyav"	Pithapuram Nageswara Rao & K.Rani	2:16
"Valachina Priyude"	R. Balasaraswathi Devi	2:25
"Raju Vedaale"	Pithapuram Nageswara Rao & R. Balasaraswathi Devi	5:42
"Guru Maharaj"	Kasturi Siva Rao	3:39
"Bhagyashalinaitine Maa Bava"	R. Balasaraswathi Devi	
"Janani O Janani Kalyani"	R. Balasaraswathi Devi	
"He He He He Inti Maata"	Kasturi Siva Rao	
"AaAaAa AaAaAa Bhonchik Chik"	Jikki	

Tamil

Song	Singer/s	Lyrics	Duration (m:ss)
"O Paradesi Un Priyadaasi"	Jikki		2:09
"Kaavinil Koovum Kogilam Thaano"	Pithapuram Nageswara Rao & R. Balasaraswathi Devi	Kambadasan	04:07
"Kaanbaeno, Kaanbaeno"	Pithapuram Nageswara Rao & R. Balasaraswathi Devi	Kambadasan	04:02
"Azhagethaane Aasaiyai Sollum"	Pithapuram Nageswara Rao & Jikki		04:14
"Hey Vidhi Idhu Yenna Vaedhanai"	R. Balasaraswathi Devi	Kambadasan	03:20
"Rajaa Goluvaayi Vandhaar"	Pithapuram Nageswara Rao & R. Balasaraswathi Devi		05:42
"Sagalamum.... Ellaam Ellaam"	K. R. Chellamuthu	Kambadasan	04:26
"Bhaagyasaali Yaanene"	Jikki	Kambadasan	02:59
"Janani O Janani"	Jikki		
"Haeyi Haeyi Veettu Pechai"	K. R. Chellamuthu		
"Thana Thana Thaana Gilaandhimi"	Jikki		
