= Malladi Ramakrishna Sastry =

Indian Telugu writer (1905–1965)

- Born: 16 June 1905; Chinnaguduru, Krishna district
- Died: 12 September 1965 (aged 60); Chennai, India
- Citizenship: India
- Education: M.A.
- Writing career
- Genres: Pundit, Playwright, Poet, Lyric writer

Malladi Ramakrishna Sastry (16 June 1905 – 12 September 1965) was a Telugu writer.

== Life ==
His family settled in Bandar (Machilipatnam) during his childhood. He completed a Bachelor of Arts degree in Machilipatnam and earned a Master of Arts degree in Telugu and Sanskrit in Madras. He studied the Vedas under Yadavalli Subbavadhanulu, Mahābhāṣya under Nori Subramanya Sastry, and the Brahma Sūtras under Sistla Narasimha Sastry. He was highly learned and was said to have knowledge of around 50 languages.

== Literary works ==
- Chalava Miriyalu (compilation of his works)
- Krishnateeram
- Tejomurthulu
- Kshetrayya
- Gopidevi
- Keligopalam
- Baala
- Aa Ee Vu R
- Safety Razor

== Filmography ==
Malladi wrote about 150 songs for nearly 40 films.

Year	Movie	Music	Song(s)
1952	Chinna Kodalu	Aswathama	"Pillanagrovi Paatakaada", "Raaraado Raachilakaa", "Jo Vayaarigade", "Paruve Baruvaayegaa", "Kadali Pongule", "Ee Chaduvinte Kada", "Ee Naadallina katha" (Anarkali Rupakam), "Chinnela Vannela", "Aasalu Bangaru Andalalekkayi", "Goppagoppolla Logillinindaa", "Chellenaa Yintatito"
1954	Palle Paduchu	M. S. Ramarao	"Eru Navvindoyi"
1955	Jayasimha	T. V. Raju	"Nadireyi Gadichene Cheliyaa"
1955	Kanyasulkam	Ghantasala	"Chitaaru Kommana Mithayi Potlam"
1955	Rechukka	Ashwathama	"Ekkadidi Andam", "Etu Choochina Bootakale", "Neesari Neevenammaa", "Bale Bale Paavuramaa", "Ontarontarigaa Poyedaanaa", "Ayyo Bangaru Saami", "Aye Sambarame", "Sogasemo Manasemo"
1956	Charanadasi	S. Rajeswara Rao	"Eedaya Chalunuraa Krishnaa"
1956	Chiranjeevulu	Ghantasala	All 17 songs including "Kanupaapa Karuvaina Kanulenduko".
1956	Sri Gowri Mahatmyam	T. V. Raju	"Sraminchu Maa Talli", "Ambaa Mangalagauri", "Neevakkadaa Nenikkadaa", "Ammaa Neevu Kannavaarinta", "Raavayyo Emayyo", "Ammaa Emammaa", "Bale Bale Gaaradi", "Taatoku Takatomku", "Shiva Manohari", "Taaraa Reraajaa", "Vallona Sikkindiraa Pitta"
1956	Sontavooru	Ghantasala	"Vennela Viriyunuraa", "Maapaala Galavaadaa", "Emi Prabhoo"

== Death ==
He died of Cerebral hemorrhage due to Hypertension on 12 September 1965 in Chennai.
