= Paradesi (1953 film) =

1953 film by L. V. Prasad

Paradesi Poongodhai
- Theatrical release poster
- Directed by: L. V. Prasad
- Screenplay by: L. V. Prasad
- Produced by: P. Adinarayana Rao; Anjali Devi (presents)
- Starring: Akkineni Nageswara Rao; Anjali Devi; Sivaji Ganesan
- Cinematography: Kamal Ghosh
- Edited by: N. S. Pragasam
- Music by: P. Adinarayana Rao
- Production company: Anjali Pictures
- Distributed by: Poorna films
- Release dates: 14 January 1953 (Telugu); 31 January 1953 (Tamil)
- Running time: 190 minutes
- Country: India
- Languages: Telugu; Tamil

Paradesi or Poongothai is a 1953 Indian Telugu-Tamil bilingual romance film, produced by P. Adinarayana Rao under the Anjali pictures banner and directed by L. V. Prasad. .This is actually the first film acted by Sivaji but Parasakthi came first.It stars Akkineni Nageswara Rao, Anjali Devi, and Sivaji Ganesan with music composed by P. Adinarayana Rao. The film is a remake of the Hindi movie Raj Rani (1950). Paradesi was an average grosser at the box office. No print of Poongothai is known to survive, making it a lost film.

== Cast ==
- Akkineni Nageswara Rao as Chandram
- Anjali Devi as Lakshmi
- S. V. Ranga Rao as Rangadu
- Sivaji Ganesan as Anand
- Relangi as Devaiah (Telugu)
- K. A. Thangavelu (Tamil)
- Janardhan as Raghu
- Ramudu Satyam as Bapaiah
- Pandari Bai as Susheela
- Suryakantham as Srugaram
- Vasantha as Taara
- Anasuya as Bangaram
- Master Mohan as Young Anand

== Production ==
After splitting out from Aswini Pictures, Anjali Devi and her husband Adinarayana Rao formed their own production house and named it Anjali Pictures. They decided to remake Raj Rani, a 1950 Hindi film directed by Satish Nigam and bought the rights. They decided to shoot the film in two languages—Telugu and Tamil, and appointed L. V. Prasad as the director. Prasad, however, did not make a direct copy of the Hindi original; he made subtle changes to the screenplay to suit the audience. The producers were looking for a new actor to play the second lead role. P. A. Perumal Chettiar, a leading film distributor suggested Sivaji Ganesan to Anjali Devi and her husband. Ganesan, who was a prominent theatre artist acquired the prefix "Sivaji" after he played Chatrapati Shivaji in a stage play. Ganesan was immediately chosen for the role and had a screen test for the first time. It was during this time that Parasakthi was made. Perumal, the film's producer made a request to Anjali Devi that Parasakthi be released before Paradesi. Anjali and Rao, the producers agreed and hence Parasakthi became Ganesan's first released film.

Sakthi Krishnaswamy wrote the dialogues while Bharathidasan and Kambadasan wrote the lyrics for the Tamil film Poongodhai.

== Soundtrack ==
Telugu

Music composed by P. Adinarayana Rao. Lyrics were written by Malladi Venkata Krishna Sharma.

Song title	Singers	length
"Jeevithame Hai"		
"Jaatibhedaalu Marachi"		
"Ayya Ghuma Ghumalaade"		
"Gaajulo Gaajulu"		
"Pilichindi Kaluvapuvvu"	Jikki	3:13
"Nenenduku Raavali"	Jikki, Pithapuram Nageswara Rao	2:57
"Kanikaramleni"		
"Raavo Thoti Raja"	A.P Komala	2:46
"Naa Hrudayamlo"		

Tamil

One song Thayagamey Vaazhka, was written by Bharathidasan and all others were penned by Kambadasan.

Song	Singer/s	Duration (m:ss)
"En Ninaivuthanil"		
"Oho Azagaana Roja"	Jikki	03:08
"Thayagamey Vaazhka"		
"Naan Yen Vara Vendum"	D. B. Ramachandran, Jikki	03:12
"Kannaal Pesi Pesi"	A. P. Komala	02:56
"Neelavaan Nedungkundram...Yen Padaithaai"	V. N. Sundaram	03:26
"Valaiyal, Jil Jil Valaiyal"	Chellamuthu	03:14
"Thaenoorum Paarijaatha Malar"	A. P. Komala and group	02:28
"Aiyaa Paarunga Vaangunga"		

== Reception ==
The film released on 14 January 1953. Both the versions did well in the run. The Tamil version Poongodhai received positive response from the critics.

In November 2013, M. L. Narasimham of The Hindu noted that the film would be "remembered as the launch pad for Sivaji Ganesan". Film critic and Telugu film director K. N. T. Sastry in his L.V. Prasad: a monograph described, "Paradesi is about urbanites" and not the conventional village-based subject. He also noted that the screenplay was very fast.
