= Peketi Sivaram =

Indian actor and film director (1918–2006)

- Born: 8 October 1918; Pekeru, Andhra Pradesh
- Died: 30 December 2006 (aged 88); Chennai, India
- Occupations: Actor; Film director
- Spouses: Jayanthi; Prabhavathi
- Children: 8
- Relatives: Thiagarajan (son-in-law); Prashanth (grandson)

Peketi Sivaram (Note: His name was sometimes spelled "Shivaram") (8 October 1918 – 30 December 2006) was an Indian actor and film director.

== Career ==
Peketi Sivaram acted in many Telugu, Tamil and Kannada films, receiving recognition for the character Bhagavan in Devadasu (1953).

He directed a few Telugu and Kannada films including Chuttarikalu (1968), Bhale Abbayilu (1969), Kula Gouravam (1972) starring N. T. Rama Rao and Rajkumar.

He received the H. M. Reddy award in 2002.

== Early and personal life ==
Peketi Sivaram was born on 8 October 1918 in Pekeru village, East Godavari district in the former Madras Presidency of British India (present day Andhra Pradesh).

He was briefly married to actress Jayanthi. He has four sons and four daughters. His daughter Peketi Shanthi is married to Thiagarajan and their son, Prashanth, is an actor in Tamil movies.

He died in Chennai on 30 December 2006. At the time of his death, he was married to Prabhavathi.

== Filmography (partial) ==
As director

Year	Title	Language
1967	Chakra Theertha	Kannada
1968	Chuttarikalu	Telugu
1969	Punarjanma	Kannada
1969	Bhale Abbayilu	Telugu
1971	Kula Gourava	Kannada
1974	Baala Bandana	Kannada
1975	Daari Tappida Maga	Kannada
1976	Sutrada Bombe	Kannada
1978	Maathu Thappadha Maga	Kannada

As actor

- Note: all films are in Telugu.

Year	Title	Role
1953	Kanna Talli	
1953	Devadasu	Bhagawan
1953	Gumasta	
1954	Rechukka	
1954	Vaddante Dabbu	Rama Rao
1955	Kanyasulkam	Police Inspector
1955	Anarkali	
1956	Chiranjeevulu	
1956	Edi Nijam	
1957	Suvarna Sundari	
1957	Bhagya Rekha	
1957	Panduranga Mahatyam	
1957	Veera Kankanam	
1957	Vaddante Pelli	
1958	Pelli Naati Pramanalu	
1959	Illarikam	
1959	Jayabheri	
1960	Sri Venkateswara Mahatyam	
1961	Velugu Needalu	
1962	Usha Parinayam	
1962	Gulebakavali Katha	
1964	Babruvahana	
1964	Thotalo Pilla Kotalo Rani	
1964	Murali Krishna	
1965	Aakasaramanna	
1974	Alluri Seetarama Raju	Dy. Collector
1982	Nivuru Gappina Nippu	
1983	M. L. A. Yedukondalu	
1983	Bezawada Bebbuli	
1984	Jagan	
1988	Aakhari Poratam	
