= Inder Raj Anand =

Indian film dialogue and screenwriter

- Born: Sargodha, Punjab Province, British Raj (present-day West Punjab, Pakistan)
- Died: 6 March 1987
- Occupations: Film dialogue writer; Screenwriter
- Years active: 1940s–1987
- Works: Aag, Aah, Anari, Sangam, Shahenshah
- Children: Tinnu Anand; Bittu Anand
- Relatives: Siddharth Anand (grandson); Mukul Anand (nephew)

Inder Raj Anand (died 6 March 1987) was an Indian film dialogue and screenwriter in Hindi cinema, who worked on many Raj Kapoor films, starting with Aag (1948), Aah (1953), Anari (1959) and Sangam (1964). While formally referred to as a writer for Hindi films, he was actually an Urdu writer, writing his scripts and dialogues in Urdu.

He was father to actor-director Tinnu Anand and producer Bittu Anand. Inder's grandson is film director Siddharth Anand (Salaam Namaste (2005) and Anjaana Anjaani (2010)). Famous director Mukul Anand was Inder's nephew. Shahenshah, starring Amitabh Bachchan, was Inder's last film as a writer. It was produced by his son, Bittu, and was directed by Tinnu. Shahenshah was released after Inder's death and it became one of the biggest hits of that year.

== Early life ==
Anand was born in Sargodha, Punjab (now Punjab, Pakistan) and would spend his student years in Lahore and Hyderabad, Sindh.

== Career ==
Anand began his career as a writer associated with Prithviraj Kapoor’s Prithvi Theatres and the People’s Theatre movement in Mumbai. He was also closely associated with writer and director K. A. Abbas through the Indian People’s Theatre Association (IPTA).

During his career, Anand wrote screenplays and dialogue for numerous Hindi films, including Safar, Sangam, and Ek Duuje Ke Liye. Several films written by Anand such as Haathi Mere Saathi, Jaani Dushman, and Shahenshah were commercially successful and remain well known in popular Hindi cinema.

== Filmography ==
Year	Film	Credit
1948	Phool Aur Kante	Writer
1948	Aag	Story and screenplay, dialogues
1950	Birha Ki Raat	Story, screenplay and dialogues
1951	Naujawan	Dialogues and story
1953	Aah	Story, screenplays and dialogues
1956	New Delhi	Screenplay
1956	C.I.D.	Screenplay and dialogues
1957	Sharada	Screenplay
1959	Choti Bahen	Screenplay and dialogues
1959	Char Dil Char Rahen	Writer
1959	Anari	Dialogues, screenplay and story
1960	Chhalia	Story & Dialogues
1961	Sasural	Dialogues and screenplay
1962	Dil Tera Deewana	Writer
1962	Asli-Naqli	Writer
1963	Hamrahi	Screenplay and dialogues
1963	Bahurani	Screenplay and dialogues
1964	Sangam	Writer
1964	Phoolon Ki Sej	Writer and Director
1964	Dulha Dulhan	Screenplay and dialogues
1964	Beti Bete	Screenplay and dialogues
1965	Aasman Mehel	Writer
1966	Chotta Bhai	Dialogues
1968	Vaasna	Dialogues
1968	Sapno Ka Saudagar	Story
1969	Nanha Farishta	Dialogues
1969	Bhai Behen	Writer
1970	Safar	Writer
1970	Ghar Ghar Ki Kahani	Dialogues
1970	Devi	Story, screenplay and dialogues
1970	Aansoo Aur Muskaan	Writer, Screenplay and dialogues
1971	Haathi Mere Saathi	Dialogues
1971	Upaasna	Screenplay and dialogues
1971	Rakhwala	Dialogues
1972	Apna Desh	Dialogues
1972	Anokha Daan	Writer
1972	Jawani Diwani	Writer
1973	Gai Aur Gori	Writer
1974	Humshakal	Dialogues
1974	Faslah	Writer
1974	Prem Nagar	Dialogues
1975	Sunehra Sansar	Writer
1975	Raaja	Writer
1975	Julie	Dialogues
1976	Nagin	Dialogues
1977	Dildaar	Dialogues
1977	Aaina	Dialogues
1977	Yehi Hai Zindagi	Dialogues
1979	Jaani Dushman	Dialogues
1981	Ek Duuje Ke Liye	Dialogues
1981	Kaalia	Dialogues
1982	Vakil Babu	Dialogues
1983	Lovers	Dialogues
1984	Raaj Tilak	Writer
1984	Jeene Nahi Doonga	Writer
1985	Mard	Dialogues
1988	Shahenshah	Screenplay

== Bibliography ==
- Gulzar; Nihalani, Govind; Chatterjee, Saibal (2003). "Encyclopedia of Hindi Cinema". Encyclopædia Britannica (India). Popular Prakashan. p. 304. ISBN 8179910660.
