= Vedantam Raghavayya =

Indian film director, choreographer, actor

- వేదాంతం రాఘవయ్య
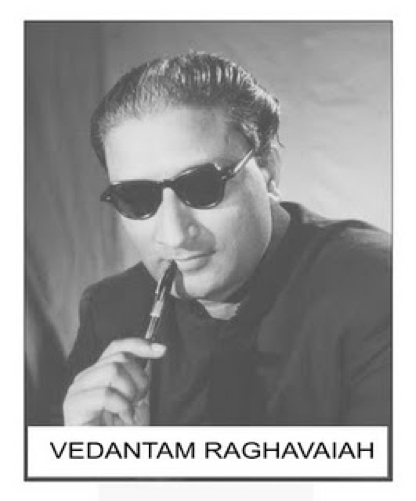
- Born: 8 June 1919; Kuchipudi, Krishna district, India
- Died: 19 October 1971 (aged 51 or 52)
- Occupations: Film director; film producer; screenwriter; choreographer
- Spouse: Suryaprabha
- Children: 7, including Shubha

Vedantam Raghavayya (8 June 1919 – 19 October 1971) was an Indian film director, dance choreographer, and actor known for his work in Telugu and Tamil cinema. An accomplished Kuchipudi dancer, he was honoured with the title "Bharata Kala Prapurna" by the Andhra Pradesh government in recognition of his expertise.

Raghavayya began his career as a dance choreographer, working on films such as Raithu Bidda (1939) and Swarga Seema (1945). He made his directorial and production debut with Stree Sahasamu (1951). He went on to direct many notable films, including Devadasu (1953), Annadata (1954), Anarkali (1955), Prema Pasam (1956), Bhale Ramudu (1956), Chiranjeevulu (1956), Suvarna Sundari (1957), and Rahasyam (1967). In addition to his work behind the camera, Raghavayya appeared as an actor in films such as Mohini Rukmanigada (1937), Garuda Garvabhangam (1943) and Raksharekha (1949). He was also a co-owner of the film production house Vinodha Pictures.

Raghavayya's influence extended beyond cinema. He served on the committee of the First General Council of the Andhra Pradesh Sangeetha Nataka Academy, representing dance, and was nominated as the President of the National Dance Festival in 1964. He also mentored notable dancers, including Bhagavathula Yagna Narayana Sarma, a Sangeet Natak Akademi awardee, under his fellowship.

== Film craft and Devadasu ==
His directorial film Devadasu (1953) was the first Telugu adaptation of Sarat Chandra Chattopadhyay's novel, and Devadas was the second Tamil adaptation of the same, following the 1937 Devadas directed by and starring P. V. Rao. During pre-production Akkineni Nageswara Rao, who portrayed the titular character, later recalled that Raghavayya, being a Kuchipudi dance exponent and an experienced stage actor, used to enact the scenes before the actors, thereby making their job easy. He recalled that the director shot him only at night so that he could give the character a "drunken, droopy" look. Those night-time shots were filmed over 50 days. The final length of both versions was 17,260 feet (5,260 m). Devadasu and Devadas are regarded as among the most successful films in Telugu and Tamil cinema respectively. Both versions were critically and commercially successful. It has since achieved cult status, with terms and phrases from the film being widely cited. In April 2013, News18 included the film in its list of "100 greatest Indian films of all time".

== Theater and dance ==
- Usha in Ushaparinayam
- Sita in Ramanataka Yakshaganam
- Leelavathi in Prahallada Yakshaganam
- Chandramathi in Hrischandra nataka Yakshaganam
- Sasirekha in Sasirekhaparinaya Yakshaganam
- Mohini in Mohini Rukmangada Yakshaganam
- Satyabhama in Bhamakalapa Yakshaganam
- Bala Gopala Tarangam

== Personal life ==
Raghavayya was born in Kuchipudi, Krishna district of Andhra Pradesh on 8 June 1919 to Vedantam Ramayya and Annapurnamma. He had six daughters and a son, including renowned Kuchipudi guru Vedantam Ramu, and actress Shubha. He was married to actress Suryaprabha, the sister of actress Pushpavalli who was married to Gemini Ganesan, and their daughter Rekha is a Hindi actress.

== Selected filmography ==
As actor and choreographer

- Mohini Rukmanigada (1937) (actor in the Balagopala Tarangam)
- Raithu Bidda (1939) (dancer and choreographer)
- Panthulamma (1943) (choreographer)
- Garuda Garvabhangam (1943) (actor and choreographer)
- Sri Seeta Rama Jananam (1944) (choreographer)
- Swargaseema (1945) (choreographer)
- Tyagayya (1946) (choreographer)
- Palnati Yudham (1947) (choreographer)
- Yogi Vemana (1947) (choreographer)
- Vande Mataram (1948) (choreographer)
- Laila Majnu (1949) (choreographer)
- Raksharekha (1949) (actor and choreographer)

As director

- Stree Sahasamu (1951) (producer and director)
- Santhi (1952) (producer and director)
- Devadasu (Telugu and Tamil) (1953) (producer and director)
- Annadata (1954) (director)
- Anarkali (1955) (director)
- Chiranjeevulu (1956) (director)
- Bhale Ramudu (Telugu, 1956) (director)
- Prema Pasam (Tamil, 1956) (director)
- Suvarna Sundari (1957) (screenplay writer and director)
- Bhale Ammayilu (Telugu, 1957) (director)
- Iru Sagodharigal (Tamil, 1957) (director); also credited for screenplay writer
- Manalane Mangayin Bhagyam (1957) (director)
- Raja Nandini (1958) (director)
- Inti Guttu (1958) (director)
- Bala Nagamma (1959) (director)
- Jai Bhawana (1959) (director)
- Adutha Veetu Penn (1960) (director)
- Mamaku Tagga Alludu (1960) (director)
- Runanubandham (1960) (director)
- Swarna Manjari (1962) (director)
- Mangaiyar Ullam Mangatha Selvam (1962) (director)
- Aada Brathuku (1965) (director)
- Nanna Kartavya (1965) (director)
- Badukuva Daari (1966) (director)
- Sati Sakkubai (1965) (director)
- Rahasyam (1967) (director)
- Sati Sumathi (1967) (director)
- Kumkumabharina (1968) (director)
- Sapta Swaralu (1969) (director)
- Ulagam Ivvalavuthan (1969) (director)
- Bhale Ethu Chivaraku Chittu (1970) (director)
