= Anjali Devi =

Indian actress

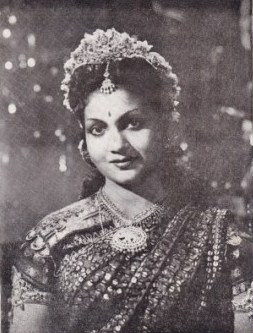
- Anjali Devi in 1949
- Born: Anjanamma; 24 August 1927; Peddapuram, East Godavari, Madras Presidency (now in Andhra Pradesh), British India
- Died: 13 January 2014 (aged 86); Chennai, Tamil Nadu, India
- Occupations: Actress; model; film producer
- Spouse: P. Adinarayana Rao (m. 1948; died 1991)

Anjali Devi ( 24 August 1927 – 13 January 2014) was an Indian actress, model and producer in Telugu and Tamil films. She was well known for her role as the Devi Sita in Lava Kusa as well as for the title roles in movies like Chenchu Lakshmi, Suvarna Sundari and Anarkali.

== Early life ==
Anjali Devi was born in Peddapuram, East Godavari district in Andhra Pradesh, India, as Anjamma. She changed her name to Anjani Kumari when acting in dramas. Later, director C. Pullaiah changed her name to Anjali Devi.

== Career ==
=== As actress ===
She was a theatre artiste before venturing into movies, her debut film role was as Lohitasva in "Raja Harishchandra" in 1936. Her first film as a heroine was Kashtajeevi by L. V. Prasad in 1940, but that film was abandoned after three reels shooting. Later, C.Pullayya discovered her and gave her the opportunity to star as Mohini in Gollabhama (1947). Based on her acting ability and looks, she became a star overnight in 1947. She eventually acted in more than 350 films, majority of them in Telugu and Tamil films and a few in Hindi, Kannada films as the heroine or in character roles.

She acted in Lava Kusa, a milestone film and the first color film in the Telugu film industry in 1963. She is well known for playing Sita in Lava Kusa and her performances in films like Suvarna Sundari and Anarkali were also appreciated. Brundavanam (1992), Anna Vadina (1993) and Police Alludu (1994) were the last few films of her career. In Balaiah's Police Alludu and Anna Vadina she appeared alongside Brahmanandam. She acted in various roles, such as a damsel, an angel, a dancer, a demon, a goddess, a traditional woman and later in mother roles.

=== As producer ===
In 1955 she produced the film Anarkali, in which she herself played the title role, with Akkineni Nageswara Rao as Prince Salim. Then she produced V. Madhusudan Rao's Bhakta Tukaram and Chandipriya. Actress Jayapradha played the lead role in the latter alongside Sobhan Babu and Chiranjeevi. As a producer she produced 27 films. An ardent devotee of Sathya Sai Baba she produced and acted in Shirdi Sai Parthi Sai Divyakatha, a tele-serial on the life and avatar of Sathya Sai Baba.

== Personal life ==
She married P. Adinarayana Rao, a music director, in 1948. They settled in Chennai. They have two sons. Together, they produced many Telugu films under the Anjali Pictures banner. Their granddaughter, Saila Rao, is also an actress.

== Death ==
Devi died at the age of 86 on 13 January 2014 at Vijaya Hospital, in Chennai, due to a cardiac arrest. Her organs were donated to Ramachandra Medical College.

== Awards ==
- Honorary doctorate from Nagarjuna University, Guntur.
- Raghupathi Venkaiah Award in 1994 for her lifetime service to the Telugu film industry.
- Ramineni National Award in 2006 in the fine arts category.
- ANR National Award in 2008.
- Tamil Nadu State Film Honorary Award – Arignar Anna Award in 2000
- Padmabhushan Dr. B. Saroja Devi National Award in 2010 by Bharathiya Vidya Bhavan, Bangalore.

== Filmography ==
=== Actress ===
Year	Film	Role	Language	Notes
1947	Gollabhama	Mohini	Telugu	
1947	Mahathma Udangar	Rambai	Tamil	
1948	Balaraju		Telugu	
1948	Adhithan Kanavu		Tamil	
1949	Kanniyin Kaadhali	Princess Megala Devi	Tamil	
1949	Keelu Gurram	Mohini	Telugu	
1949	Mayavathi		Tamil	
1949	Mangaiyarkarasi		Tamil	
1950	Palleturi Pilla	Santha	Telugu	
1950	Sri Lakshmamma Katha	Sri Lakshmamma	Telugu	
1950	Swapna Sundari	Swapna Sundari	Telugu	
1950	Maya Rambha		Telugu	
1951	Nirdoshi	Nirmala	Telugu	
1951	Niraparadhi		Tamil	
1951	Sarvadhigari		Tamil	
1951	Sarvadhikari		Telugu	
1951	Mayalamari		Telugu	
1951	Mayakkari		Tamil	
1951	Marmayogi		Tamil	
1951	Marmayogi		Telugu	
1951	Tilottama		Telugu	
1951	Mayamalai		Tamil	
1951	Stree Sahasam		Telugu	
1951	Strisahasam		Tamil	
1952	Ezhai Uzhavan		Tamil	
1953	Pakkinti Ammayi	Leela Devi	Telugu	
1953	Inspector		Tamil	
1953	Poongodhai		Tamil	
1953	Paradesi		Telugu	
1953	Ladki	Kamini	Hindi	Hindi Debut
1954	Rechukka	Nana	Telugu	
1954	Naattiya Thara	Nana	Tamil	
1954	Penn	Kamini	Tamil	
1954	Sangham	Kamini	Telugu	
1954	Sorga Vasal	Thilagawathi	Tamil	
1954	Ponvayal	Semba	Tamil	
1954	Rattha Pasam		Tamil	
1955	Anarkali	Anarkali	Telugu	
1955	Charana Daasi		Telugu	
1955	Kanavaney Kankanda Deivam	Princess Nalini	Tamil	
1955	Kalam Maripochu		Tamil	
1955	Jayasimha		Telugu	
1955	Jayasimman		Tamil	
1955	Doctor Savithri		Tamil	
1955	Mudhal Thethi		Tamil	
1955	Town Bus	Amudha	Tamil	
1956	Devta		Hindi	
1956	Mathar Kula Manickam		Tamil	
1956	Kaalam Maari Pochu		Tamil	
1957	Allauddin Adhbhuta Deepam	Yasmin, the Princess	Telugu	
1957	Alavudheenum Arputha Villakkum	Yasmin, the Princess	Tamil	
1957	Panduranga Mahatyam	Rama	Telugu	
1957	Suvarna Sundari		Telugu	
1957	Manaalane Mangaiyin Baakkiyam	Sundari	Tamil	
1957	Chakravarthi Thirumagal	Kalamalini	Tamil	
1957	Neelamalai Thirudan	Maragatham	Tamil	
1958	Bhooloka Rambai	Bhooloka Rambai	Tamil	
1958	Bhooloka Rambha	Bhooloka Rambha	Telugu	
1958	Chenchu Lakshmi	Goddess Lakshmi	Telugu	
1958	Chenchu Lakshmi	Goddess Lakshmi	Tamil	
1958	Illarame Nallaram		Tamil	
1958	Raja Nandini	Ramani	Telugu	
1958	Kanniyin Sabadham		Tamil	
1958	Kudumba Penn	Sri Lakshmamma	Tamil	
1959	Jayabheri	Manjulavani	Telugu	
1959	Bala Nagamma		Telugu	
1959	Kalaivanan		Tamil	
1959	Naan Sollum Ragasiyam		Tamil	
1960	Bhatti Vikramarka		Telugu	
1960	Mannadhi Mannan	Princess Karpagavalli	Tamil	
1960	Aadavantha Deivam	Kalyani	Tamil	
1960	Adutha Veettu Penn		Tamil	
1960	Engal Selvi		Tamil	
1961	Naganandhini		Tamil	
1961	Pangaaligal		Tamil	
1962	Bhishma	Amba	Telugu	
1962	Swarna Manjari		Telugu	
1962	Mangaiyar Ullam Mangatha Selvam		Tamil	
1962	Naag Devta	Mohini	Hindi	
1963	Lava Kusa	Sita	Telugu	
1963	Lava Kusa	Sita	Tamil	
1963	Paruvu Prathishta		Telugu	
1965	Sati Sakkubai		Telugu	
1966	Chilaka Gorinka		Telugu	
1966	Palnati Yudham		Telugu	
1966	Rangula Ratnam		Telugu	
1967	Bhakta Prahlada	Leelavati	Telugu	
1967	Rahasyam		Telugu	
1968	Veeranjaneya	Sita	Telugu	
1969	Sri Rama Katha	Bhavani, wife of Makaradhwaja Maharaju	Telugu	
1970	Amma Kosam		Telugu	
1971	Dasara Bullodu	Yashoda	Telugu	
1971	Kalyana Mandapam		Telugu	
1971	Sabatham	Rajeswari	Tamil	
1971	Arunodhayam		Tamil	
1972	Badi Panthulu		Telugu	
1972	Maa Inti Velugu		Telugu	
1972	Bala Bharatam		Telugu	
1972	Tata Manavadu		Telugu	
1973	Bhakta Tukaram	Avali Bai	Telugu	
1973	Nindu Kutumbam	Shantha	Telugu	
1973	Srivaru Maavaru	Bhagyalakshmi	Telugu	
1973	Mayadari Malligadu	Saraswathi	Telugu	
1973	Jeevana Tarangalu		Telugu	
1974	Peddalu Maarali	Seetha	Telugu	
1974	Uttama Illalu	Lakshmi	Telugu	
1974	Urimai Kural		Tamil	
1975	Soggadu		Telugu	
1975	Mallela Manasulu	Annapoorna	Telugu	
1976	Padi Pantalu	Seethamma, Mother of Gopi	Telugu	
1976	Mahakavi Kshetrayya		Telugu	
1976	Raaja	Raaja's mother	Telugu	
1976	Monagadu	Shantamma	Telugu	
1977	Seetha Rama Vanavasam		Telugu	
1977	Kurukshetram	Kunti	Telugu	
1978	Dudu Basavanna	Gouramma	Telugu	
1979	Annai Oru Alayam		Tamil	
1979	Amma Evarikaina Amma		Telugu	
1979	Tiger		Telugu	
1979	Mande Gundelu		Telugu	
1980	Ram Robert Rahim		Telugu	
1980	Venkateswara Vratha Mahatyam	Parvathy	Telugu	
1980	Chandipriya		Telugu	
1980	Adrushtavanthudu	Janaki	Telugu	
1980	Bhale Krishnudu		Telugu	
1981	Jeevitha Ratham	Savithri	Telugu	
1983	Lanke Bindelu	Parvathamma	Telugu	
1983	Poratam			
1984	Pozhudhu Vidinjachu		Tamil	
1985	Surya Chandra		Telugu	
1986	Tandra Paparayudu		Telugu	
1986	Sri Shirdi Saibaba Mahathyam		Telugu	
1987	Srutilayalu		Telugu	
1987	Punnami Chandrudu		Telugu	
1987	Kadhal Parisu		Tamil	
1989	Krishna Gari Abbayi		Telugu	
1992	Brundavanam	Lakshmi Devi	Telugu	
1994	Police Alludu	Annapurnamma	Telugu	
1995	Big Boss		Telugu	

=== Producer ===
- Paradesi
- Suvarna Sundari
- Swarnamanjari
- Chandi Priya
- Sati Sakkubai
- Shirdi Sai Sathya Sai Divya Katha (television series)
- Anarkali

== See also ==
- Krishnaveni
- Bhanumathi
