= Mala Pilla =

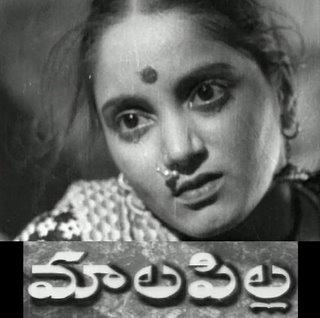
- Directed by: Gudavalli Ramabrahmam
- Written by: Tapi Dharma Rao
- Produced by: Gudavalli Ramabrahmam, Yarlagadda Sivarama Prasad
- Starring: Kanchanamala; Gali Venkateswara Rao; Govindarajula Subba Rao; Sundaramma
- Cinematography: Sailen Bose
- Music by: Bhimavarapu Narasimha Rao
- Production company: Sarathi Films
- Release date: 25 September 1938
- Running time: 175 minutes
- Country: India
- Language: Telugu

Mala Pilla, or Malapilla, (English: Girl from Mala caste) is a 1938 Indian Telugu-language social problem film directed by Gudavalli Ramabrahmam and written by Tapi Dharma Rao. The film was produced by Raja of Challapalli, Yarladadda Sivarama Prasad, under the Sarathi Films banner. It featured Kanchanamala in the title role, with Gali Venkateswara Rao, Govindarajula Subba Rao, P. Suribabu, and Sundaramma in other prominent roles.

It is a social drama depicting the love story between a Brahmin boy and a Dalit girl. The film dealt with themes like untouchability, taboos on entry into temples for Dalits, Gandhism, and nationalism in pre-independent India. The film was dedicated to the Maharajah of Travancore, Chithira Thirunal Balarama Varma, who had passed a law allowing members of all castes to enter temples.

Malapilla was released in a record 12 centres on September 25, 1938, and was an industry hit. On its release, the film caused a sensation, rejecting the stage-derived mythological genre dominating Telugu cinema in the 1930s. The film's success kindled interest in other Telugu filmmakers to make films based on social themes. Malapilla was also the 50th talkie film made in Telugu cinema.

== Plot ==
Inspired by Gandhi, Radhabayamma (Hemalatha Devi) launches the Harijan movement in Kalyanapuram village, much to the chagrin of the orthodox Brahmin community and the upper castes. When Dalits try to enter the temple, the trustee, Sundara Ramasastry (Govindarajula Subbarao), stops them. His son, Nagaraju (Gali Venkateswara Rao), a photographer, falls in love with Sampalatha. Chowdharayya (P. Suribabu), a Gandhian, makes a futile attempt to bring a compromise between the upper castes and the Dalits. Nagaraju and Sampalatha elope to Calcutta, where he finds a job. Anasuya (Sundaramma) Sampalatha's sister accompanies them. Nagaraju educates Sampalatha. In the village, Chowdharayya leads a non-violent movement by Dalits against the upper castes. Dalits save Sundara Ramasastry's wife from a fire accident, and Sastry is a changed man, now agreeing to allow harijans into the temple. With his father's blessings, Nagaraju marries Sampalatha.

== Cast ==
- Kanchanamala as Sampalatha
- Gali Venkateswara Rao as Nagaraju
- Govindarajula Subba Rao as Sundara Ramasastry
- P. Suribabu as Chowdharayya
- V. V. Subbaiah
- Raghavan
- Sundaramma as Anasuya
- Hemalatha Devi as Radhabayamma
- Gangarathnam
- Katuri Jaganmohan
- Vangara

== Production ==
=== Development ===
The village girl Sampalatha's character in Malapilla based on Gudipaati Venkata Chalam's unpublished novelette. Tapi Dharma Rao wrote the screenplay for Malapilla, while most of Chalam's dialogues were retained.

=== Casting ===
During his stint as a production director with Vel Pictures, Ramabrahmam felt that Kancanamala was not fit for acting and rejected her. As she rose in career, he realised he was wrong and signed her for the village girl Sampalatha's character. Sceptics commented that she was a misfit for such a complex character as she was famous for glamorous roles until then. But her performance as an illiterate downtrodden village belle in the first half and as the literate modern city woman in the later portions was commended

Dr. Govindarajula Subbarao, a veteran stage actor and a popular LMP doctor from Tenali was cast for the role of the antagonist Sundara Ramasastry. At first he refused to take up the assignment as he was asked to shave his head and moustache. After his mother gave him permission to do so, he relented.

=== Filming ===
The film was shot in 40 days at K. Subrahmanyam's Motion Picture Producers Studio in Mount Road, Madras that was later acquired in an auction by S. S. Vasan who renamed it Gemini Studios. The film was dedicated to the Maharajah of Travancore, Chithira Thirunal Balarama Varma who had passed a law allowing members of all castes to enter temples.

== Music ==
Bhimavarapu Narasimha Rao (BNR) composed the music for the film. The soundtrack had 17 songs and 5 poems mostly based on folk music. Ramabrahmam took three of Basavaraju Apparao's by then popular lyrics – Kollayi gattithe nemi, Nallavaade Gollapillavaade, and Aa mabbu...ee mabbu. The songs were highly popular.

- Aa Mabbu Ee Mabbu
- Jai Mahadev
- Jatara Setamu Ra
- Vaduku Vaduku
- Kuleelandaru Ekamu Kavale Ra
- Venu Manohara Ganamu
- Savirahe Tavadeena
- Nallavade Gollapillavade

== Release ==
The film was released in a record 12 centres on 25 September 1938. Some people tried to stop the screening; in retaliation Ramabrahmam gave free passes to Brahmins who wanted to watch it. Some people who watched the film went home and bathed to get rid of the sin of watching such a film.

== Reception and legacy ==
The film was a big hit. On its release, it caused a sensation, rejecting the stage-derived mythological genre dominating Telugu cinema in the 1930s. The film's success kindled interest in other Telugu filmmakers to make films based on social themes.

Malapilla discarded the litearary Telugu used in films until then and traded it for colloquial Telugu in its dialogue. Kanchanamala's still from the film's promotional calendar became popular and found its way into many calendars in Telugu homes.
