= Telugu cinema =

- No. of screens: 1726 screens in Andhra Pradesh and Telangana states of India (2022)
- Main distributors: Suresh Productions; Geetha Arts; Vyjayanthi Movies; DVV Entertainment; Annapurna Studios; Arka Media Works; Sri Venkateswara Creations; Mythri Movie Makers; Haarika & Hassine Creations; Varahi Chalana Chitram; Sri Venkateswara Cine Chitra

Produced feature films (2022)
- Total: 219

Number of admissions (2022)
- Total: 233 million

Telugu cinema, also known as Tollywood, is the segment of Indian cinema dedicated to the production of motion pictures in the Telugu language, widely spoken in the states of Andhra Pradesh and Telangana. Based in Film Nagar, Hyderabad, Telugu films sold 23.3 crore (233 million) tickets in 2022, the highest among all Indian film industries. As of 2023, Andhra Pradesh has the highest number of movie screens in India.

Since 1909, filmmaker Raghupathi Venkaiah Naidu was involved in producing short films and exhibiting them in different regions of South Asia. He established the first Indian-owned cinema halls in South India. In 1921, he produced the silent film, Bhishma Pratigna, generally considered to be the first Telugu feature film. As the first Telugu film producer and exhibitor, Naidu is regarded as the 'Father of Telugu cinema'. The first Telugu talkie (sound) film is considered to be Kalidas (1931), directed by H. M. Reddy, due to full-length dialogues in Telugu. However, Bhakta Prahlada (1932) featured the entire soundtrack in Telugu along with dialogues. The 1950s and 1960s are considered the golden age of Telugu cinema, featuring enhanced production quality, influential filmmakers, and notable studios, resulting in a variety of films that were both popular and critically acclaimed.

The industry, initially based in Madras, Tamil Nadu, began shifting to Hyderabad, Andhra Pradesh in the 1970s, completing the transition by the 1990s. This period also saw the rise of star-driven commercial films, technological advancements, and the development of major studios like Ramoji Film City, which holds the Guinness World Record as the largest film studio complex in the world. The 2010s marked a significant period for Telugu cinema, as it emerged as a pioneer of the pan-Indian film movement, expanding its audience across India and internationally. This development enhanced the industry's prominence in Indian and world cinema while also increasing the recognition of Telugu actors across the country. Baahubali 2 (2017) not only introduced the ₹1,000 crore club to Indian cinema but also set a new benchmark with a ₹200 crore opening day worldwide. This film also won the Saturn Award for Best International Film, and RRR (2022) became the first Indian feature film to win an Academy Award, receiving multiple international accolades, including a Critics' Choice Award for Best Foreign Language Film and a Golden Globe Award. Kalki 2898 AD (2024) is the most expensive Indian film ever made. Telugu cinema now boasts the highest number of films in both the ₹1,000 crore club and those with a ₹100 crore and ₹200 crore opening day worldwide.

Since its inception, Telugu cinema has been known as the preeminent centre for films based on Hindu epics. Today, it is also noted for advancements in technical crafts, particularly in visual effects and cinematography, making it one of the most state of the art cinema. Telugu cinema has produced some of India's most expensive and highest-grossing films, including Baahubali 2 (2017), which holds the record for the highest footfalls for an Indian film in the 21st century. Over the years, Telugu filmmakers have also ventured into parallel and arthouse cinema. Films like Daasi (1988), Thilaadanam (2000), and Vanaja (2006), among others, received acclaim at major international film festivals such as Venice, Berlin, Karlovy Vary, Moscow, and Busan. (Note: As early as 1933, C. Pullayya's Sati Savitri received an honorary diploma at the 2nd Venice International Film Festival. Later, as part of the Parallel cinema movement, Mrinal Sen's Oka Oori Katha (1977) received the Special Jury Prize at the Karlovy Vary International Film Festival. K. Viswanath's Sankarabharanam (1980) won the Prize of the Public at the Besançon Film Festival in France, while his Swathi Muthyam (1986) was India's official entry to the 59th Academy Awards. B. Narsing Rao's Maa Ooru (1987) earned the Main prize at the Mediawave International Film Festival in Hungary; his films Daasi (1988) and Matti Manushulu (1990) both received the Special Diploma at the 16th and 17th Moscow International Film Festival, respectively. K. N. T. Sastry's Thilaadanam (2000) won the New Currents award at the 7th Busan International Film Festival, and Rajnesh Domalpalli's Vanaja (2006) received the Best First Feature Award at the 57th Berlin International Film Festival.) Additionally, ten Telugu films have been featured in CNN-IBN's list of the "100 Greatest Indian Films of All Time." (Note: Telugu films in the list include Pathala Bhairavi (1951), Malliswari (1951), Devadasu (1953), Mayabazar (1957), Nartanasala (1963), Maro Charitra (1978), Maa Bhoomi (1979), Sankarabharanam (1980), Sagara Sangamam (1983), and Siva (1989).)

== History ==
=== Early development ===
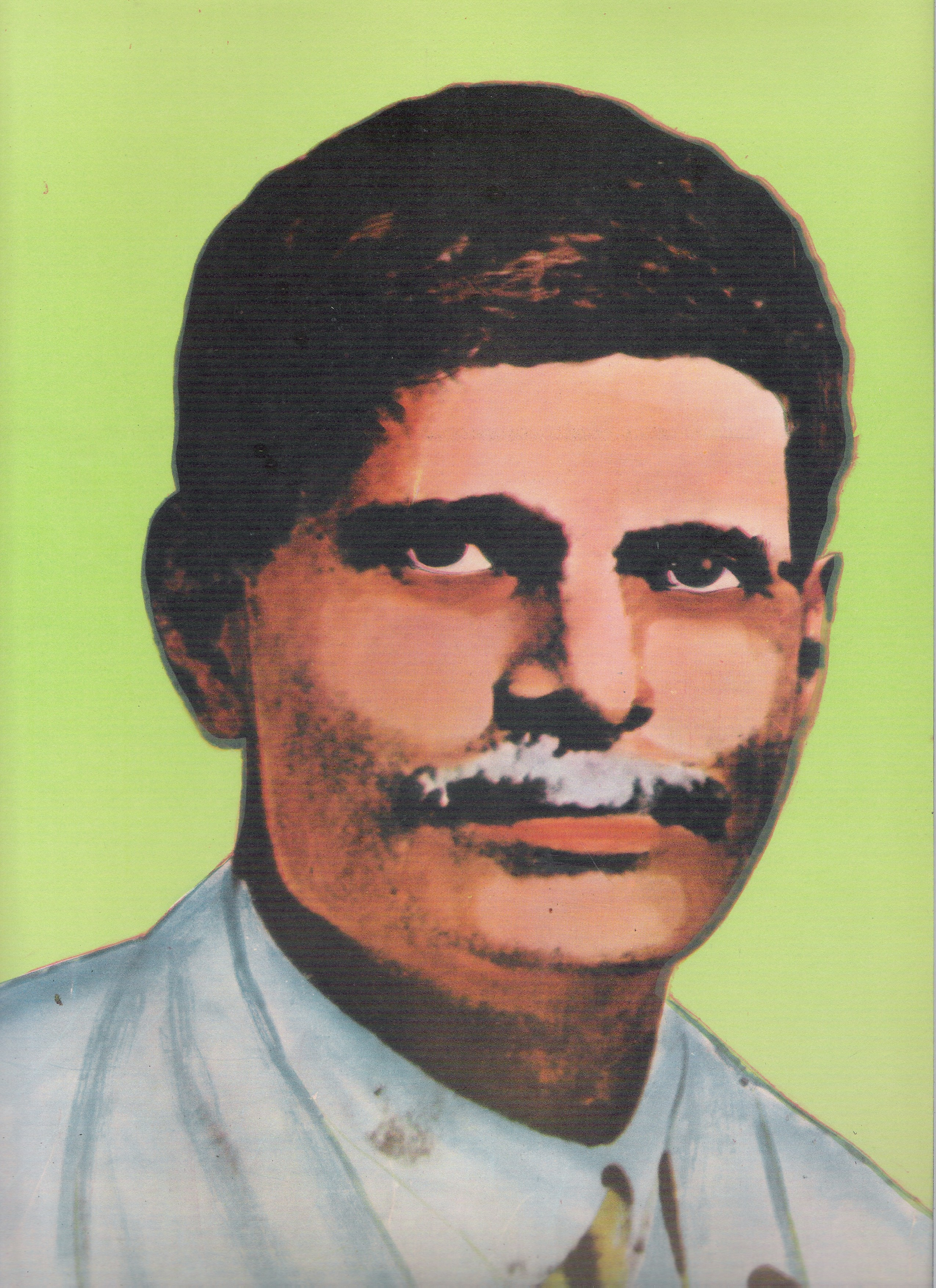
Raghupathi Venkaiah Naidu, father of Telugu cinema.

Raghupathi Venkaiah Naidu was a photographer and photographic studio owner in Madras who was drawn into filmmaking. Since 1909, he was involved in producing short films. He shot 12 three-minute-long short films and exhibited them in Victoria Public Hall, Madras. He also travelled to Bangalore, Vijayawada, Sri Lanka, Rangoon and Pegu to exhibit his films. In c. 1909-10, he established a tent house called Esplanade in Madras to exhibit his films. In c. 1912-14, he established Gaiety Theatre on Mount Road, the first ever permanent cinema theatre in Madras and all of South India. He later constructed the Crown Theatre and Globe Theatre. In his theatres, he screened American and European films as well as silent films made in various parts of India.

In 1919, he started a film production company called 'Star of the East Films' also called 'Glass Studio', the first production company established by a Telugu person. He sent his son, Raghupathi Surya Prakash to study filmmaking in the studios of England, Germany, and United States. In 1921, they made Bhishma Pratigna, generally considered as the first Telugu feature film. Raghupathi Venkaiah produced the film, while R. S. Prakash directed and produced it along with playing the title character Bhishma. As the first Telugu film exhibitor and producer, Raghupathi Venkaiah is regarded as the 'Father of Telugu cinema'.

From 1921 to 1931 about a dozen feature films were made by Telugu people. C. Pullayya made a three-reel short film, Markandeya (1926 or 1931) at his house in Kakinada. In 1921, the first cinema hall in Andhra, Maruthi Cinema was established in Vijayawada by Pothina Srinivasa Rao. Y. V. Rao and R. S. Prakash established a long-lasting precedence of focusing exclusively on religious themes —Gajendra Moksham, Nandanar, and Matsyavataram —three of their most noted productions, centred on religious figures, parables, and morals.

=== Rise of the "talkie" ===
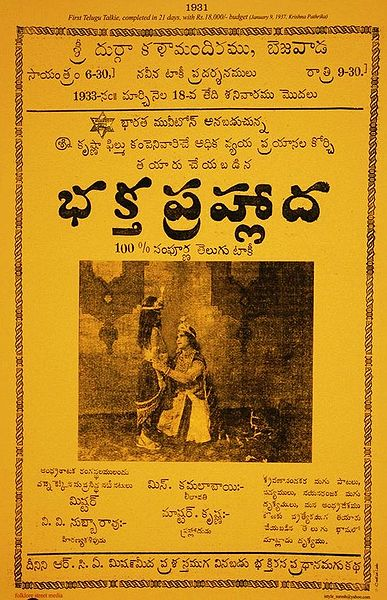
Promotional poster of Bhakta Prahlada, the first full-length Telugu talkie to have a theatrical release.

The first Telugu film with audible dialogue, Bhakta Prahlada, was directed by H. M. Reddy. Bhakta Prahlada was shot over 18 or 20 days at Imperial Studios, Bombay and was produced by Ardeshir Irani who also produced Alam Ara, India's first sound film. The film had an all-Telugu starcast featuring Sindhoori Krishna Rao as the titular Prahlada, Munipalle Subbayya as Hiranyakasyapa, and Surabhi Kamalabai as Leelavathy. Bhakta Prahlada was completed on 15 September 1931, which henceforth became known as "Telugu Film Day" to commemorate its completion.

Popularly known as talkies, films with sound quickly grew in number and popularity. In 1932, Sagar Movietone produced Sri Rama Paduka Pattabhishekam and Sakunthala, both directed by Sarvottam Badami. Neither the producer nor the director of these two films were Telugus. In 1933, Sati Savitri directed by C. Pullayya received an honorary diploma at the 2nd Venice Film Festival. In the same year, Pruthvi Putra, based on the story of Narakasura was released. It starred Kalyanam Raghuramayya and was produced by Pothina Srinivasa Rao, who had previously built the first cinema hall in Andhra in 1921. This was the first Telugu talkie entirely financed by Telugu people.

In 1934, the industry saw its first major commercial success with Lava Kusa. Directed by C. Pullayya and starring Parupalli Subbarao and Sriranjani, the film attracted unprecedented numbers of viewers to theatres and thrust the young industry into mainstream culture. Dasari Kotiratnam produced Sati Anasuya in 1935 and became the first female producer of Telugu film industry.

The first film studio in Andhra, Durga Cinetone, was built in 1936 by Nidamarthi Surayya in Rajahmundry. Sampurna Ramayanam (1936) was the first film produced by the studio relying mostly on local talent. In 1937, another studio called Andhra Cinetone was built in Visakhapatnam. However, both the studios were short-lived. Early Telugu silent films and talkies were deeply influenced by stage performances, continuing the traditions of theatre onto the screen. These films often retained the same scripts, dialogues, and background settings as their stage counterparts.

=== Emergence of social themes ===
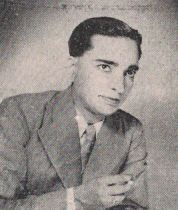
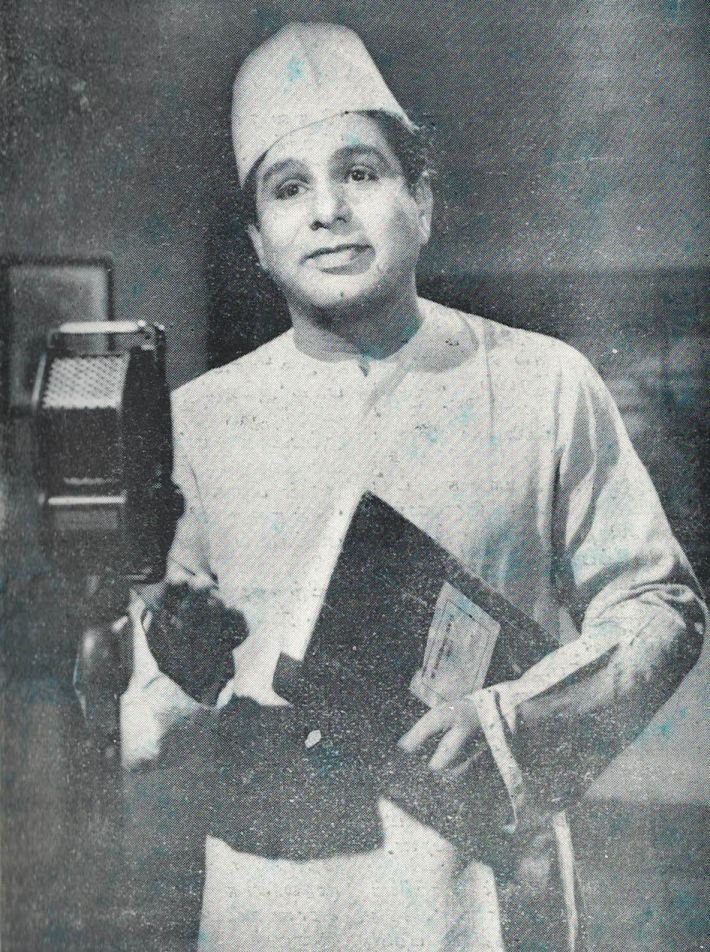
Y. V. Rao (left), pioneer of cinema during crown rule and stalwart Chittooru Nagayya (right), known for his method acting.

By 1936, the mass appeal of film allowed directors to move away from religious and mythological themes. That year, under the direction of Kruthiventi Nageswara Rao, Prema Vijayam, a film with a contemporary setting, was released. It was the first Telugu film with a modern-day setting as opposed to mythological and folklore films. Later, more 'social films' i.e. films based on contemporary life and social issues, were made by filmmakers. Notable among them was Vandemataram (1939), touching on societal problems like the practice of dowry. Telugu films began to focus more on contemporary life, with 29 of the 96 films released between 1937 and 1947 featuring social themes.

In 1938, Gudavalli Ramabrahmam has co-produced and directed the social problem film, Mala Pilla starring Kanchanamala. The film dealt with the crusade against untouchability, prevailing in pre-independent India. In 1939, he directed Raithu Bidda, starring thespian Bellary Raghava. The film was banned by the British administration in the region, for depicting the uprise of the peasantry among the Zamindar's during the British raj. The success of these films gave an impetus to Y. V. Rao, B. N. Reddy and others to produce films on social themes. Viswa Mohini (1940) is the first Indian film depicting the Indian movie world. The film was directed by Y. V. Rao and scripted by Balijepalli Lakshmikantha Kavi, starring V. Nagayya. Rao subsequently made the sequel films Savithri and Sathyabhama (1941–42) casting thespian Sthanam Narasimha Rao.

The outbreak of World War II and the subsequent resource scarcity caused the British Raj to impose a limit on the use of filmstrip in 1943 to 11,000 feet, a sharp reduction from the 20,000 feet that had been common till then. As a result, the number of films produced during the war was substantially lower than in previous years. Nonetheless, before the ban, an important shift occurred in the industry: Independent studios formed, actors and actresses were signed to contracts limiting whom they could work for, and films moved from social themes to folklore legends. Ghantasala Balaramayya, has directed the mythological Sri Seeta Rama Jananam (1944) under his home production, Prathiba Picture, marking Akkineni Nageswara Rao's debut in a lead role.

=== The golden age ===
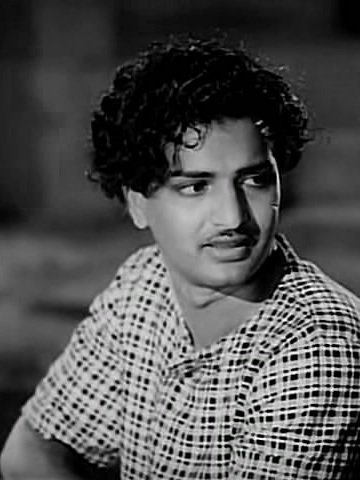
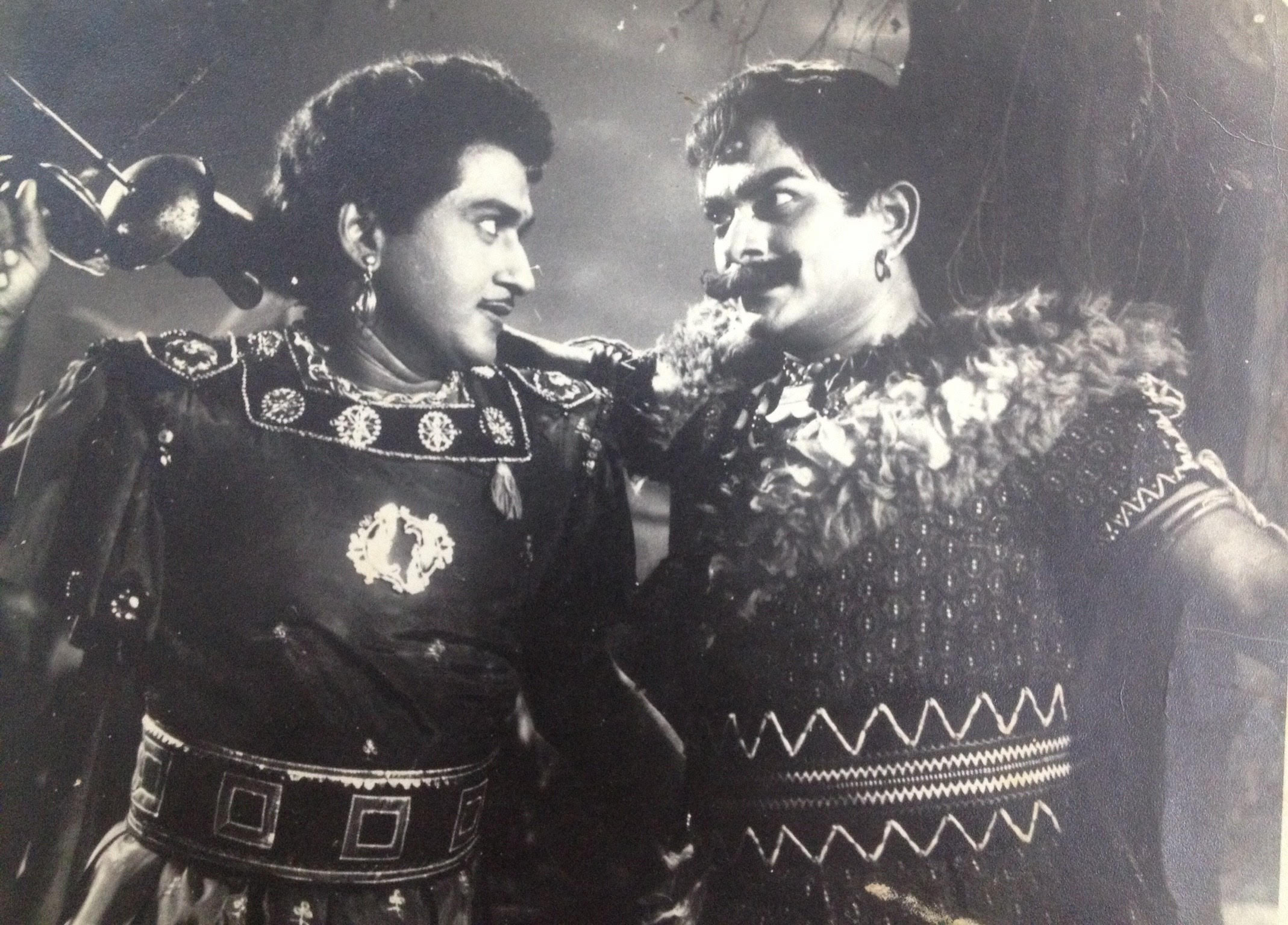
From left to right: A production still of Mayabazar (1957), N. T. Rama Rao in Shavukaru (1950), Kantha Rao with Raajanala in a folklore combat scene

The 1950s and 1960s are often regarded as the golden age of Telugu cinema. This era witnessed significant advances in production quality, the establishment of iconic studios, and the rise of influential filmmakers who shaped the industry. Prominent production houses such as Vijaya Productions, Vauhini Studios, Bharani Pictures, Prasad Art Pictures, and Annapurna Pictures were established during the late 1940s and 1950s. These studios played a crucial role in the development of Telugu cinema, contributing to the production of over 300 films between 1950 and 1960. Many Telugu-Tamil bilinguals were made during this period.

During this era, the Telugu film industry became one of the largest producers of folklore, fantasy, and mythological films. Directors like K. V. Reddy and B. Vittalacharya pioneered these genres, creating films that captivated audiences with their imaginative storytelling. As demand for films grew, filmmakers recognised the potential to remake earlier productions with enhanced cinematic techniques. Many mythological films originally made in the early talkie era, which featured actors from drama troupes and were limited by the technical constraints of the time, were reimagined in this era with improved technologies. Pathala Bhairavi (1951) emerged as the most successful folklore film of the decade and turned its lead actors, N. T. Rama Rao and S. V. Ranga Rao, into stars. Other notable mythological and folklore films from the decade include Mayabazar (1957), Panduranga Mahatyam (1957), Suvarna Sundari (1957), Bhookailas (1958), Jayabheri (1959), Sri Venkateswara Mahatyam (1960), and Raja Makutam (1960).

Among these, K. V. Reddy's Mayabazar is revered for its innovative use of special effects, such as the first illusion of moonlight, showcasing the technical brilliance of the era. In 2013, CNN-IBN included Mayabazar in its list of "100 greatest Indian films of all time," with the public voting it as the "greatest Indian film of all time."

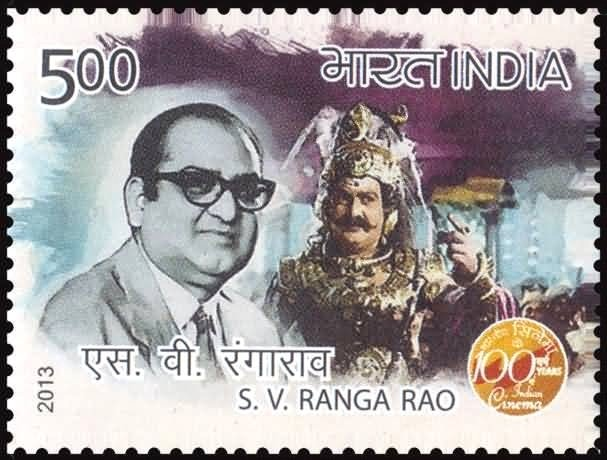
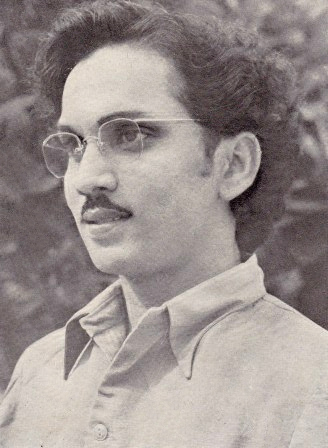
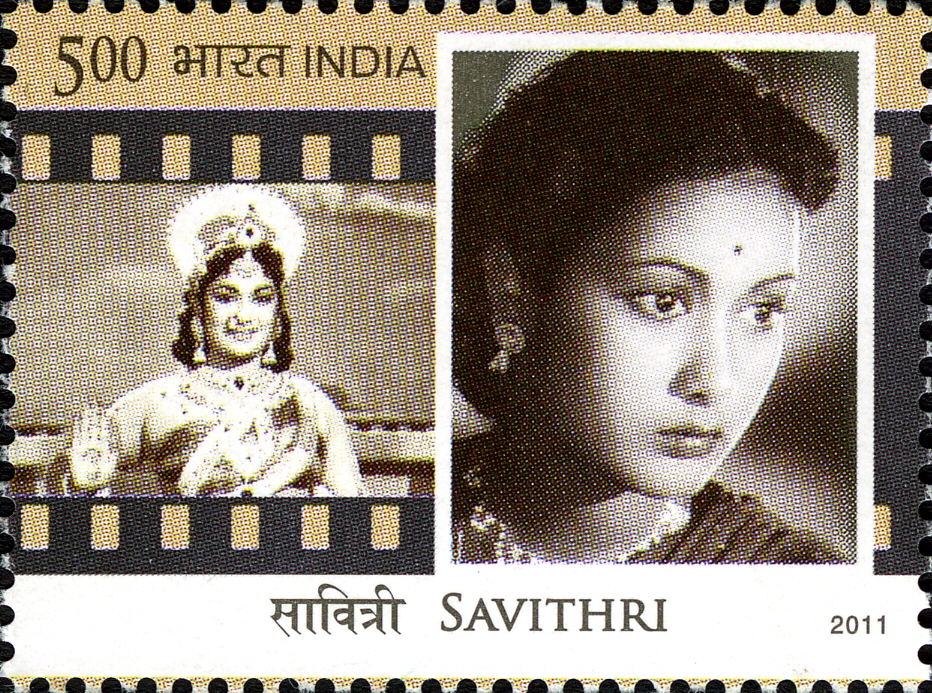
From left to right: S. V. Ranga Rao on a 2013 stamp, A. Nageswara Rao, and Savitri on a 2011 stamp

This period also continued the trend of social films, which began in the late 1930s, focusing on contemporary issues and everyday life rather than mythology and fantasy. Notable social films from the decade included Pelli Chesi Choodu (1952), Puttillu (1953), Devadasu (1953), Pedda Manushulu (1954), Missamma (1955), Ardhangi (1955), Rojulu Marayi (1955), Donga Ramudu (1955), and Thodi Kodallu (1957), many of which performed well at the box office.

In addition to mythological and social films, the period was marked by an increasing influence of world cinema and Bengali literature on Telugu filmmakers. The International Film Festival of India, initiated in 1952, exposed Indian filmmakers to global cinema, inspiring them to experiment with new storytelling techniques. Devadasu (1953), an adaptation of Sarat Chandra Chattopadhyay's 1917 Bengali novel Devdas, transformed Akkineni Nageswara Rao (ANR) from a folklore film hero into a star of social films. Missamma (1955), directed by L. V. Prasad, and adapted from two Bengali works, became a landmark in Telugu cinema. It was celebrated for its blend of humour, drama, and social commentary. Savitri emerged as a leading actress after this film. Likewise, Thodi Kodallu (1957) and Mangalya Balam (1959) were also adapted from Bengali novels.

In the late 1940s and early 1950s, many members of the Praja Natya Mandali and Abhyudaya Rachayithala Sangham, both affiliated with the Communist Party, transitioned into the film industry, bringing with them progressive ideas that subtly influenced the industry, though they eventually adapted to the commercial demands of mainstream cinema. During the 1950s and 1960s, Telugu film songs entered a golden era marked by exceptional lyricism, orchestration, and technological advancements. Prominent lyricists like Samudrala Sr., Pingali Nagendra Rao, Devulapalli Krishna Sastry, and Kosaraju Raghavayya, alongside composers like Saluri Rajeswara Rao, Ghantasala, T. V. Raju, Pendyala, and Master Venu, set new standards for the film song. Playback singers like Ghantasala, Rao Balasaraswathi Devi, P. Leela, Jikki, P. B. Srinivas and P. Suseela emerged as prominent voices, defining the musical landscape of the era. This period also saw the rise of notable dance choreographers like Pasumarthi Krishnamurthy and Vempati Peda Satyam, who enhanced the artistic quality of Telugu cinema.

The 1950s also saw the formation of Andhra State in 1953 and Andhra Pradesh in 1956 leading to calls for the Telugu film industry to relocate from Madras to the new state capital, Hyderabad. Despite these calls, the industry remained in Madras, where studios were already established and actors and technicians were settled. One early response to the call for relocation was the establishment of Sarathi Studios in Hyderabad in 1956, although it initially struggled to attract filmmakers. Over time, the formation of Andhra Pradesh opened new markets for Telugu films in the Telangana region, laying the groundwork for the industry's eventual expansion into Hyderabad.

During this golden era, several Telugu films received international recognition. Malliswari (1951), a historical romance film directed by B. N. Reddy, was screened at the 1952 Peking film festival, making it the first Telugu film to be screened in China. A 16 mm print of the film was also showcased in the United States. Nartanasala (1963) won three awards at the third Afro-Asian Film Festival in Jakarta. K. V. Reddy's Donga Ramudu (1955) was archived in the curriculum of the Film and Television Institute of India, and Nammina Bantu (1960) received critical acclaim at the San Sebastián International Film Festival. Films like Ummadi Kutumbam (1967), Sudigundalu (1968), and Bapu's Sakshi (1967) were showcased at various international film festivals, highlighting the global reach of Telugu cinema.

Vijaya Productions, led by Nagi Reddi and Chakrapani, became the most successful production company of the era. Their collaborative approach brought together some of the best talents in the industry, resulting in a string of hits that defined the golden age of Telugu cinema. Vijaya Productions operated like a Hollywood studio, with staff hired on monthly salaries, and working regular hours. Comedy also played a vital role during this era, with the double act of Relangi and Ramana Reddy becoming immensely popular. Their performances provided comic relief in several films. This era, marked by groundbreaking films, innovative storytelling, and international recognition, remains a golden chapter in the history of Telugu cinema.

=== Shift from Madras to Hyderabad ===
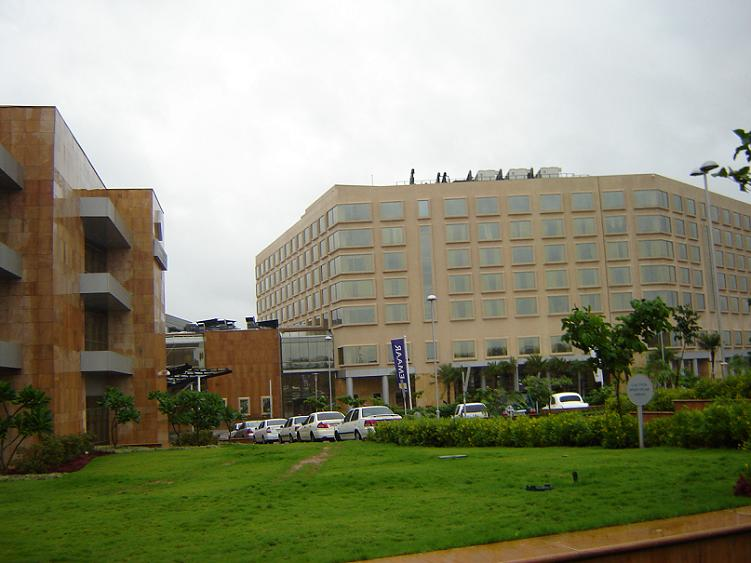
Hyderabad International Convention Center has been the Hyderabad home for Filmfare Awards South since 2007.

The Telugu film industry, commonly known as Tollywood, traces its origins to the early 20th century in Madras (now Chennai), which was the capital of the Madras Presidency, a region that included Andhra. Raghupathi Venkaiah Naidu, often regarded as the father of the Telugu film industry, was a pioneering figure who established Star of the East Films and the Glass Studio. The industry initially flourished in Madras, with major studios such as Vauhini Studios, founded by Moola Narayana Swamy and B. N. Reddy in 1948, and Prasad Studios, established by L. V. Prasad in 1956.

The shift from Madras to Hyderabad began in the 1950s, largely influenced by the formation of Andhra Pradesh in 1956. Sarathi Studios was established in Hyderabad in 1956, marking the beginning of this transition. It was the first film studio facility in Hyderabad. Before this, Hyderabad was primarily known for Hindi film releases. The success of Rojulu Marayi (1955), which ran for 100 days in Hyderabad, prompted the then Revenue Minister of Andhra Pradesh, K. V. Ranga Reddy to urge Telugu filmmakers to relocate to Hyderabad. In response, Yarlagadda Sivarama Prasad, the Raja of Challapalli, who produced Rojulu Marayi, acquired land in Hyderabad in March 1956 to set up a studio. In 1959, Maa Inti Mahalakshmi, the first Telugu film entirely filmed in Hyderabad, was released.

Akkineni Nageswara Rao was one of the first prominent figures to move his film business entirely to Hyderabad, encouraging others to do the same and playing a crucial role in the industry's relocation. He insisted on working in films produced in Andhra Pradesh, except for those made at Vauhini and Venus Studios in Madras. In 1976, the Andhra Pradesh government allocated 22 acres of land in Banjara Hills, Hyderabad, to Akkineni Nageswara Rao for the establishment of a film studio. This led to the founding of Annapurna Studios in 1976. By the 1970s and 1980s, most production houses had moved to Andhra Pradesh or opened branch offices there.

By the early 1990s, Hyderabad had become the central hub for Telugu cinema, further strengthened by the development of large film studios like Ramoji Film City, a 1,600-acre integrated film studio complex, which holds the Guinness World Record as the largest film production facility in the world. In 2006, 245 Telugu films were produced, the highest in India. The influence of Telugu cinema extended beyond regional boundaries, with many successful films being remade in other Indian languages. As of 2022, the Telugu film industry produces over 300 films annually, contributing significantly to the region's economy and maintaining a prominent position in Indian cinema.

The Prasads IMAX located in Hyderabad is one of the largest 3D IMAX screens, and the most attended cinema screen in the world. As per the CBFC report of 2014, the industry is placed first in India, in terms of films produced yearly. The industry holds a memorandum of understanding with the Motion Picture Association of America to combat video piracy. In the years 2005, 2006, 2008, and 2014 the industry has produced the largest number of films in India, exceeding the number of films produced in Bollywood.

The digital cinema network company UFO Moviez marketed by Southern Digital Screenz (SDS) has digitised several cinemas in the region. The Film and Television Institute of Telangana, Film and Television Institute of Andhra Pradesh, Ramanaidu Film School and Annapurna International School of Film and Media are some of the largest film schools in India. The Telugu states consist of approximately 2800 theatres, the largest number of cinema halls of any state in India. Being commercially consistent, Telugu cinema had its influence over commercial cinema in India.

The 1989 film Shiva is widely regarded as the trendsetter of Telugu Cinema both in terms of box office performance across languages and technical brilliance. Shiva has inspired many directors like SS Rajamouli, Puri Jagannadh, Sandeep Reddy Vanga, Ashutosh Gowariker, V.V. Vinayak, Sekhar Kammula, Anurag Kashyap, Madhur Bhandarkar, Sriram Raghavan etc. Audience and filmmakers often credit Shiva for changing the course of Indian Cinema forever. Shiva is also one of the very few films in India that is widely being discussed even after three and a half decades of its release.

Produced on a shoestring budget, 2000 film Nuvve Kavali became a turning point for low budget films and has set new benchmarks for Telugu Cinema in the early 2000s. It was screened for 200 days in 20 centres

=== Thematic diversity and genre innovations ===
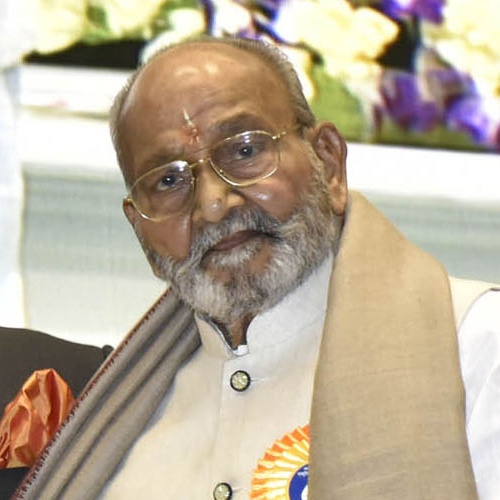
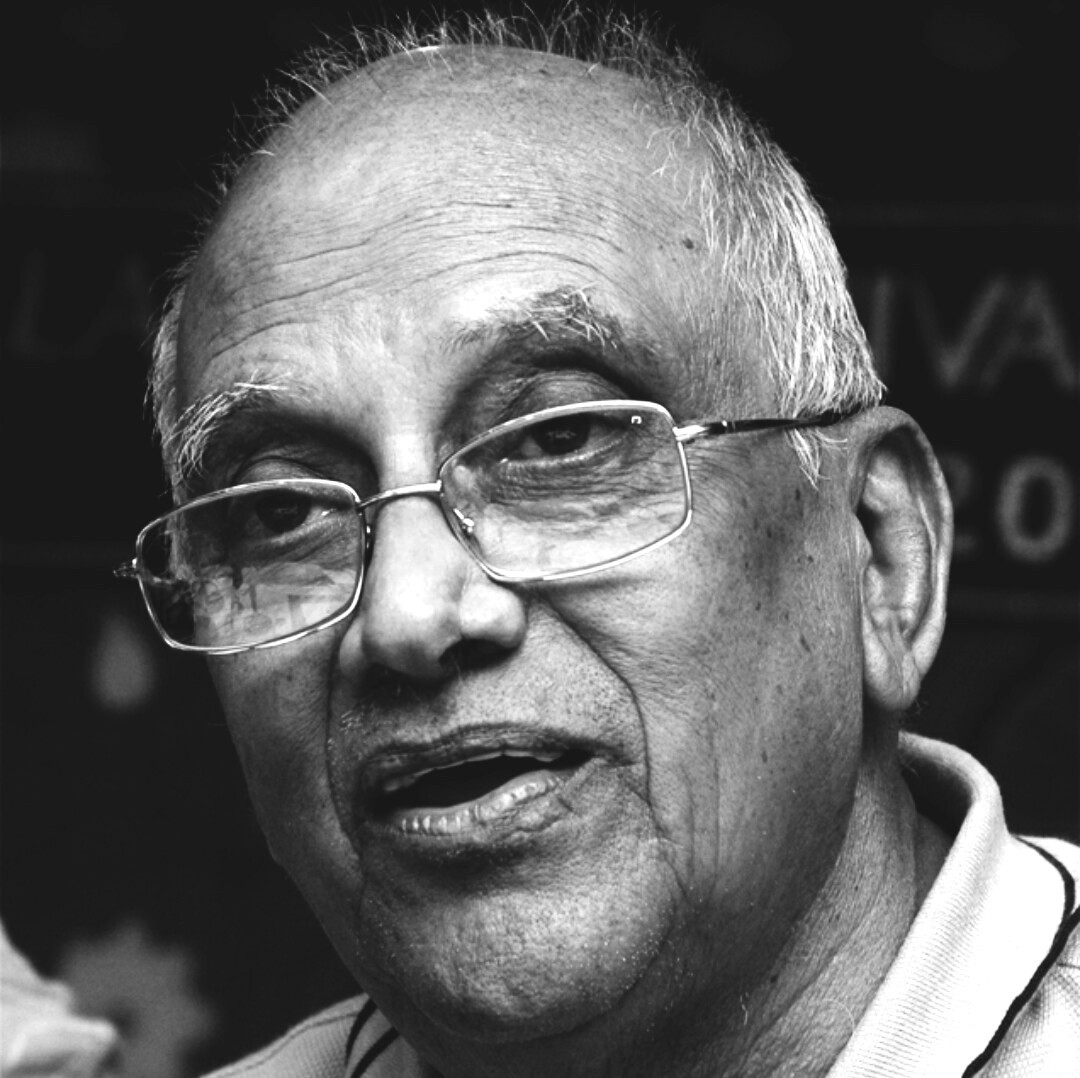
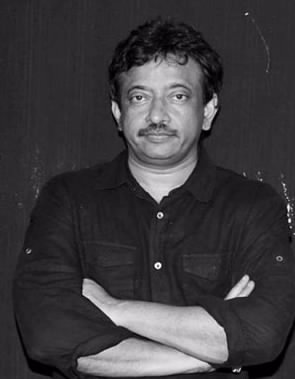
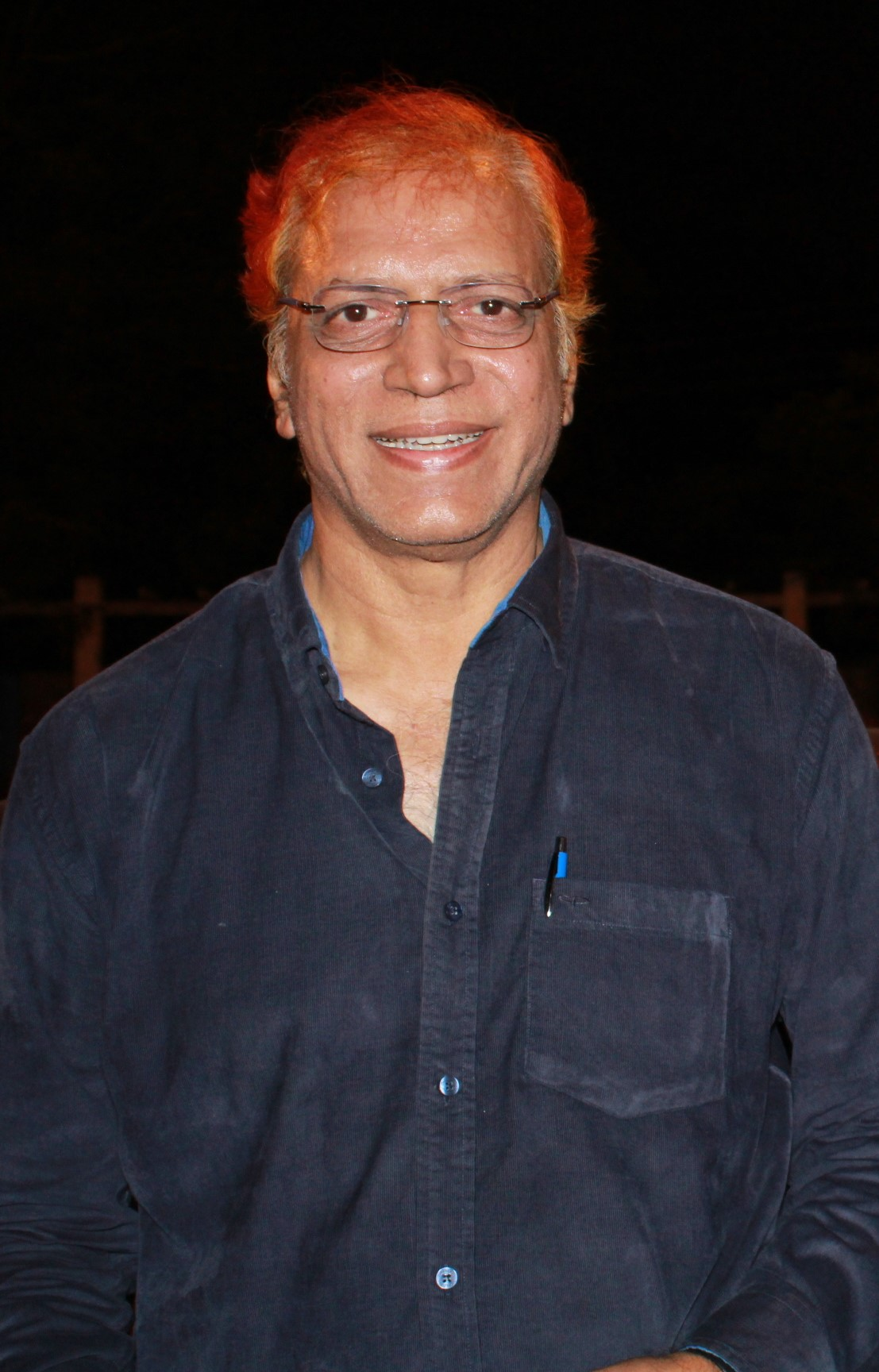
From top to bottom: K. Viswanath, Singeetam Srinivasa Rao, Jandhyala, Ram Gopal Varma and B. Narsing Rao

K. Viswanath, one of the prominent auteurs of Indian cinema, he received international recognition for his works, and is known for blending parallel cinema with mainstream cinema. His works such as Sankarabharanam (1980) about revitalisation of Indian classical music won the "Prize of the Public" at the Besançon Film Festival of France in the year 1981. Forbes included J. V. Somayajulu's performance in the film on its list of "25 Greatest Acting Performances of Indian Cinema". Swathi Muthyam (1986) was India's official entry to the 59th Academy Awards. Swarnakamalam (1988) the dance film choreographed by Kelucharan Mohapatra, and Sharon Lowen was featured at the Ann Arbor Film Festival, fetching three Indian Express Awards.

Dasari Narayana Rao directed the most number of films in the Telugu language, exploring themes such as aesthetics in Meghasandesam (1982), Battle of Bobbili in the biographical war film Tandra Paparayudu (1986), alternate history with Sardar Papa Rayudu (1980), and gender discrimination in Kante Koothurne Kanu (1998) for which he received the Special Jury Award (Feature Film - Director) at the 46th National Film Awards. K. Raghavendra Rao explored devotional themes with Agni Putrudu (1987), Annamayya (1997), Sri Ramadasu (2006), Shirdi Sai (2012) and Om Namo Venkatesaya (2017) receiving various state honours.

Singeetam Srinivasa Rao introduced science fiction to the Telugu screen with Aditya 369 (1991), the film dealt with exploratory dystopian and apocalyptic themes. The edge of the seat thriller had characters which stayed human, inconsistent and insecure. The film's narrative takes the audience into the post apocalyptic experience through time travel, as well as folklore generation of 1500 CE, which including a romantic backstory, the "Time Machine" made it a brilliant work of fiction.

Jandhyala popularly known as "Hasya Brahma" (Brahma of comedy), ushered a new era of comedy in Telugu cinema, where his movies captivated audiences with their blend of humour and social commentary. "Before his movies, comedy was a small part of movies and comedians were sidekicks to the hero or villain. Jandhyala proved that comedy can itself be a full-length subject and achieved a great success in this endeavor." His films are well known as clean entertainers affable to the family audiences without any obscene language or double entendre. Aha Naa Pellanta! is considered one of the best comedy films in Telugu cinema.

Ram Gopal Varma's Shiva starring Nagarjuna, which attained cult status in Telugu cinema, is one of the first Telugu films produced after the migration of Telugu film industry from Madras to Hyderabad to feature characters speaking the Telangana dialect. Varma was credited with the introduction of steadicams and new sound recording techniques in Telugu films. Within a year of the film's release, more than ten steadicams were imported into India. Shiva resonated with all age groups and attracted a wide audience during its theatrical run, and its success encouraged filmmakers to explore a variety of themes and make experimental Telugu films.

Subsequently, Varma introduced a variety of genres with films like Antham, Kshana Kshanam, Govinda Govinda, Gaayam, Anaganaga Oka Roju, Deyyam etc. Varma experimented with close-to-life performances by the lead actors, which bought a rather fictional storyline a sense of authenticity at a time when the industry was being filled with unnecessary commercial fillers. Most of Varma's 90's films are widely considered to have been ahead of their time due to their groundbreaking technical innovations, realistic themes, and disruption of conventional formula films. Varma broke away from the prevalent "song and dance" and "all jolly" themes of the era, introducing gritty crime dramas (the "Mumbai noir" genre), intense psychological thrillers, and intelligent horror films to a wider audience.

Chiranjeevi's works, such as the comedy-thriller Chantabbai, the vigilante film Kondaveeti Donga (notable for being released in 70 mm with 6-track stereophonic sound), the cowboy film Kodama Simham, and the action-thriller Gang Leader, contributed to popularising genre films and achieved significant audience footfall. In 2024, he was honoured with the Padma Vibhushan, India's second-highest civilian award, for his contributions to the arts and cinema.

Sekhar Kammula debuted with his National Award-winning film, Dollar Dreams (2000) featuring dialogue in both Telugu and English. Dollar Dreams explored the conflict between American dreams and human feelings. The film re-introduced social realism to Telugu screen, and brought back its lost glory which until then was stuck in its run-of-the-mill commercial pot-boilers.

Vanaja (2006) won several international awards including the first prize in the live-action feature film category at the Chicago International Children's Film Festival. Dream (2012), has garnered the Royal Reel Award at the Canada International Film Festival. 2013 Social problem film, Naa Bangaaru Talli won Best Film award at the Detroit Trinity International Film Festival.

Minugurulu (2014) about blind children received Best Indian Film at the "9th India International Children's Film Festival Bangalore". 2013 Cultural film, O Friend, This Waiting! has received special mention at the Erasing Borders Festival of Classical Dance, Indo-American Arts Council, New York, 2013. Experimental film Parampara has garnered the Platinum Award for Best Feature at the International Indonesian Movie Awards. 2018 biographical film Mahanati based on the life of veteran actress Savitri has garnered the "Equality in Cinema Award" at the 2018 Indian Film Festival of Melbourne.

During the 1990s, the Rayalaseema dialect was portrayed in films about the factional conflicts in the area, while the Telangana dialect, already having been pegged to villainous and comedic roles, saw an increase in this usage in reaction to the shift of the Telugu film production from Madras to Hyderabad. After the formation of the state of Telangana in 2014, Telangana culture gained more prominence, and more films were produced portraying Telangana culture, and dialect.

=== Sub-genres and off-beat films ===
Screenwriters such as Chandra Sekhar Yeleti experimented with the off beat film Aithe (2003) with a caption "all movies are not the same". Aithe was made on a shoestring budget of about 1.5 crores and went on to collect more than 6 crores. After almost two years he delivered another thriller Anukokunda Oka Roju (2005) both films were a refreshing change of pace to the audiences, produced by Gangaraju Gunnam. Aithe was remade in Tamil as Naam (2003) and in Malayalam as Wanted (2004).

Mohana Krishna Indraganti explored themes of chastity and adultery in his 2004 literary adaptation Grahanam, based on Dosha Gunam written by social critic G. V. Chalam. The film was shot with a digital camera on a modest budget of approximately ₹8 lakh, with artists and technicians reportedly working without any remuneration. B. Anuradha of Rediff.com noted, "In this offbeat film, Indraganti upholds the tirade against chauvinists who accuse a noble lady of infidelity, ignoring her denials with contempt". The film was featured at the Independent South Asian Film Festival in the United States.

Speaking about the centenary of Indian cinema at the CII Media and Entertainment Summit 2012, filmmaker Shekhar Kapur said regional cinema is surpassing Hindi cinema in content and story, and cited Eega (2012) as an example. Kapur said he was impressed with its story and use of technology, and called it, "no less than a Hollywood superhero film". Shah Rukh Khan called Eega an "awesomely original" film and a "must watch" with children. Eega won various awards at the 8th Toronto After Dark Film Festival.

Sub Genre war drama Kanche (2015) by Krish Jagarlamudi explored the 1944 Nazi attack on the Indian army in the Italian campaign, during World War II in an engrossing background tale of caste-ism while giving it a technically brilliant cinematic rendition. Sankalp Reddy explored submarine warfare in his directorial debut Ghazi (2017), based on the mysterious altercation between PNS Ghazi and INS Karanj during the Indo-Pakistani War of 1971. Indo-Asian News Service called new-generation film maker Sandeep Vanga's Arjun Reddy the "most original, experimental work to come out of Telugu cinema in a long time", and said the protagonist's (played by Vijay Deverakonda) "rise, fall and rise ... is nothing short of poetic and heart wrenching". Actor-dancer Allu Arjun produced and acted in the short film, I Am That Change (2014), to spread awareness on individual social responsibility. The movie was directed by Sukumar, which was screened in theatres across Andhra Pradesh and Telangana on Indian Independence day, 2014.

Adivi Sesh scripted the Neo-noir Kshanam (2016), based on a real life incident of a missing three-year-old girl. Sesh wrote the R.A.W. thriller Goodachari (2018), and the war docudrama Major (2022) shortly after.

Cinema Bandi (2022) scripted and directed by Praveen Kandregula, and produced by Raj and D. K., explored the story of how a lost camera inspires dreams in a Telugu village, winning the Jury Special Mention at the 53rd IFFI.

Balagam (2023), a slice of life story directed by Venu Yeldandi, was noted by some international juries as one of the best off-beat films of the year. Paul Nicodemus of The Times of India cited Prashanth Varma's super-hero film Hanu Man for merging elements of mythology with contemporary action, and offering a unique viewing experience in Indian cinema.

=== Rise of pan-Indian cinema ===
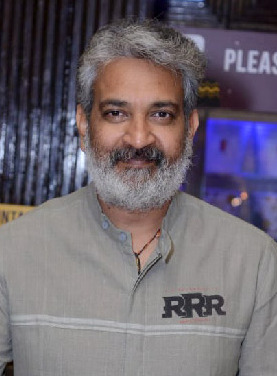
S. S. Rajamouli at RRR promotions

Pan-Indian film is a term related to Indian cinema that originated with Telugu cinema as a mainstream commercial cinema appealing to audiences across the country with a spread to world markets. S. S. Rajamouli pioneered the pan-Indian films movement with duology of epic action films Baahubali: The Beginning (2015) and Baahubali 2: The Conclusion (2017), that changed the face of Indian cinema. "Pan-India film" is both a style of cinema and a distribution strategy, designed to universally appeal to audiences across the country and simultaneously released in multiple languages.

Film journalists and analysts, such as Baradwaj Rangan and Vishal Menon, have labelled Prabhas as the "first legit Pan-Indian Superstar" in Indian cinema. Actors like Prabhas, Allu Arjun, Ram Charan and N. T. Rama Rao Jr. enjoy a nationwide popularity among the audiences after the release of their respective Pan-Indian films.

RRR propelled Telugu cinema into the mainstream outside India, fuelling the growth of Pan-India movies. It received universal critical acclaim for its direction, screenwriting, cast performances, cinematography, soundtrack, action sequences and VFX. The film was considered one of the ten best films of the year by the National Board of Review, making it only the seventh non-English language film ever to make it to the list. The song "Naatu Naatu" won the Oscar for Best Original Song at the 95th Academy Awards, making it the first song from an Indian film, as well as the first from an Asian film, to win in this category. This made the film the first Indian film by an Indian production to win an Academy Award.

Srivatsan S of The Hindu wrote that Telugu cinema has excelled in marketing Pan-Indian films. It primarily employed two strategies – promoting the film outside their home territory and collaborating with other regional stars for more visibility. Following the international success of Pushpa: The Rise (2021), RRR (2022), Salaar: Part 1 – Ceasefire (2023). Rahul Devulapalli of The Week identified "Content, marketing, and indulgent overseas audience" have led to the rise of world cinema in Telugu language. The Guardian cited Kalki 2898 AD as a "maximalist sci-fi epic mixing Mahabharata with Mad Max". Pushpa 2: The Rule is another notable pan-Indian film and has set multiple box office records, including becoming the highest-grossing film in Hindi.

=== Expanding global distribution ===
Athadu was released with six prints in United States and was distributed by Vishnu Mudda and Soma Kancherla of Crown DVD distribution company in San Jose, Dallas, Detroit, Virginia, New Jersey, Atlanta, Chicago, Los Angeles, Boston, Minneapolis, Phoenix at Arizona and also in centers like Lowell at Massachusetts, MA, Tulsa at Oklahoma, West Virginia, Springfield, Boulder at Colorado and Corpus Christi at South Texas. Because of the demand, another print was imported from India for screening. The film's first screening in USA happened at Cine Plaza 13 at North Bergen on the night of 11 August 2005. At Connecticut, a special screening was conducted on 19 August 2005. Initially one show was planned but because of the demand another show was screened. There at the theatre, a turn out of 442 people was observed which included standing audience for 434 seats and about 60 could not be accommodated. Apart from USA, the film released in selected screens in United Kingdom, Singapore, Germany and Australia.

Bommarillu was released worldwide with 72 prints. Owing to its success, the number of reels grew to about hundred. It collected a distributors share of ₹5 crore in its opening week in India. Released in six major metros in the United States, the film collected $73,200 (then approximately ₹0.3 crore) within the first four days of screening. A 2006 survey conducted by a popular entertainment portal in the United States revealed that the film was watched by an Indian expatriate population of 65,000, which generated a revenue of ₹3 crore at that time. A cumulative gross revenue for the film was reported to be ₹25 crore including ₹3.5 crore from overseas, the largest for any Telugu film at that time. Owing to this path breaking trade, the film was remade into Tamil, Bengali, Oriya and Urdu/Hindi.

2006 action film, Pokiri has been remade in Hindi, Tamil and Kannada in the following two years owing to the film's commercial success. It was screened at the IIFA film festival held in Dubai in 2006. Walt Disney Pictures co-produced Anaganaga O Dheerudu, making it the first South Indian production by Disney. Dookudu was released among seventy nine screens in the United States, the Los Angeles Times quoted it as The biggest hit you've never heard of. In the rest of north, east and west India, it opened up in 21 cities. The film set a box office record by collecting a gross of more than ₹100 crore at the time.

On 1 June 2022, RRR was screened in over 100 theatres across the United States for a one night event called "#encoRRRe". Speaking to Deadline Hollywood, Dylan Marchetti of Variance Films said that "With more than 250 films coming out of India annually, RRR could be a gateway drug". Nashville Scene's Jason Shawhan wrote about the event that "the nationwide encore of RRR is American audiences reaching with outstretched arms to something so exciting and rock-solid entertaining that its success already happened without insular traditional media even mentioning it. This isn't America dipping a toe in Indian cinema — it's a victory lap". Filmmaker S. S. Rajamouli has been signed by American talent agency Creative Artists Agency, owing to RRR being the only non-English-language film to trend globally on Netflix Platform for 10 consecutive weeks.

== Cast and crew ==
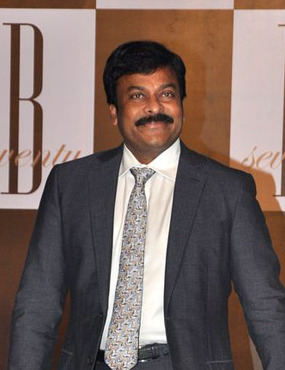
Chiranjeevi

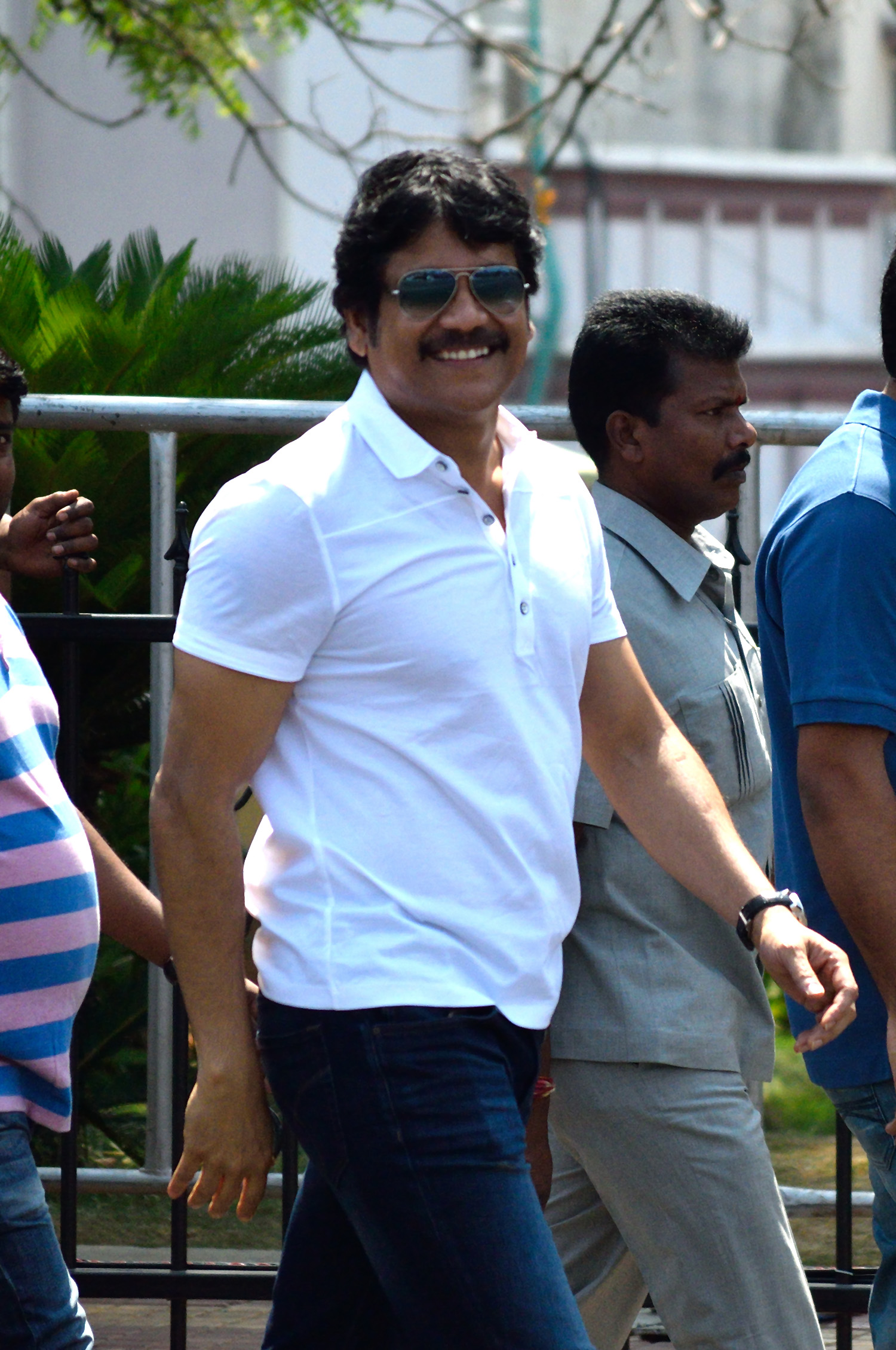
Nagarjuna

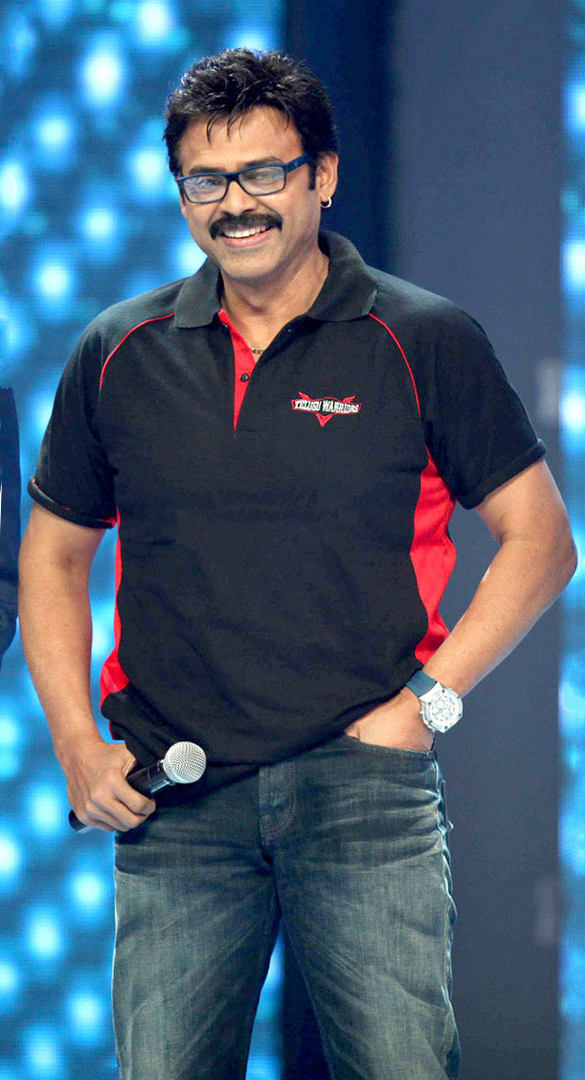
Venkatesh

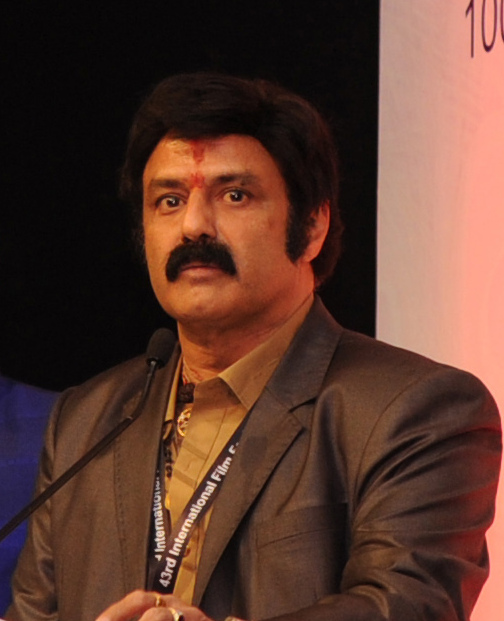
Balakrishna

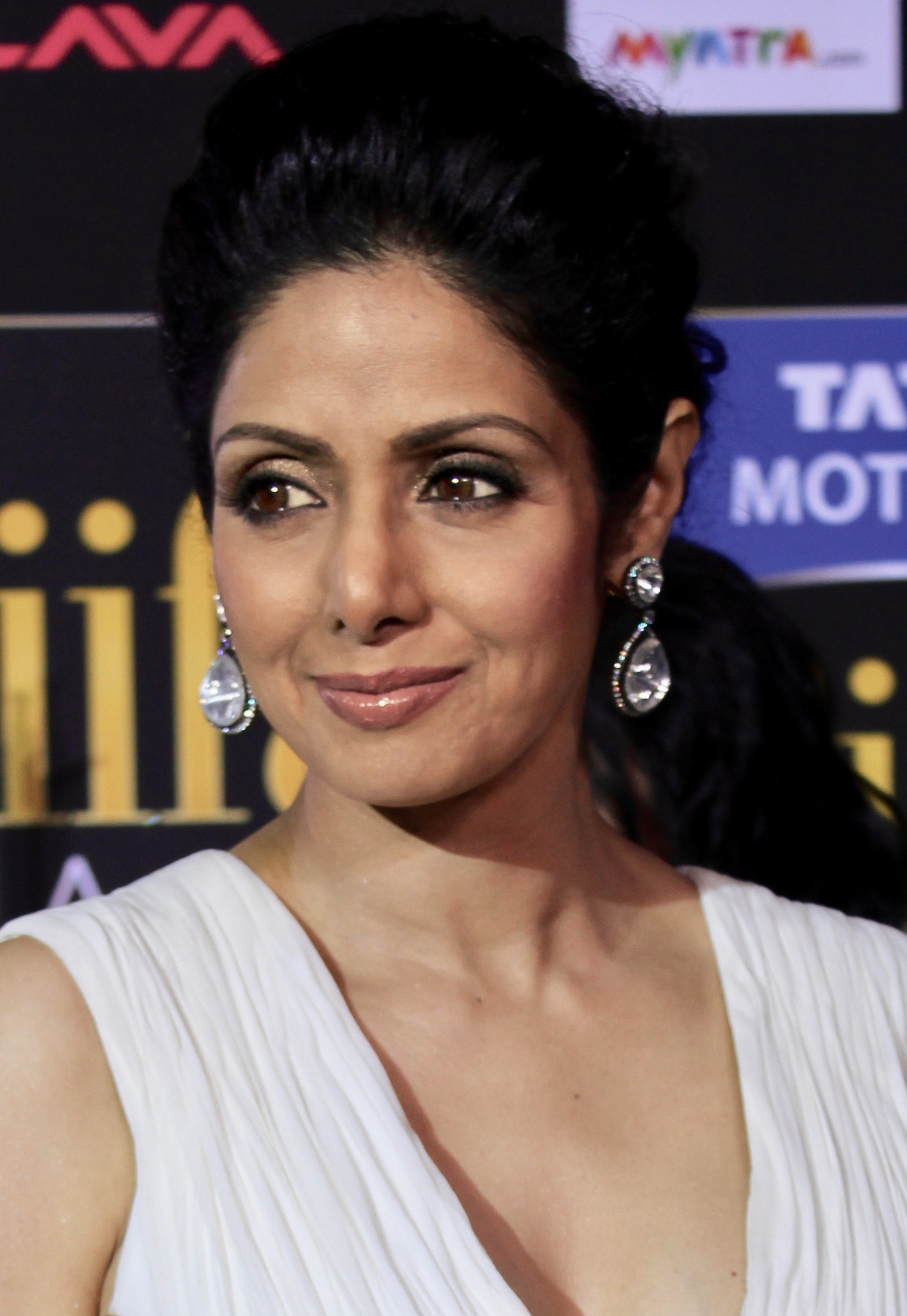
Sridevi

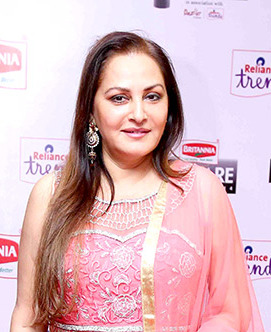
Jayaprada

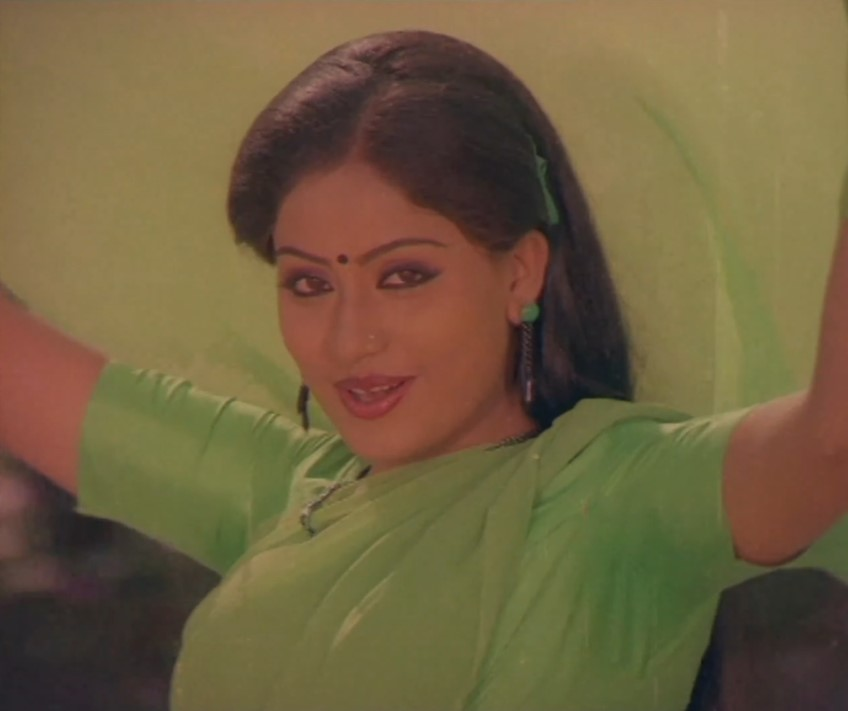
Vijayashanti

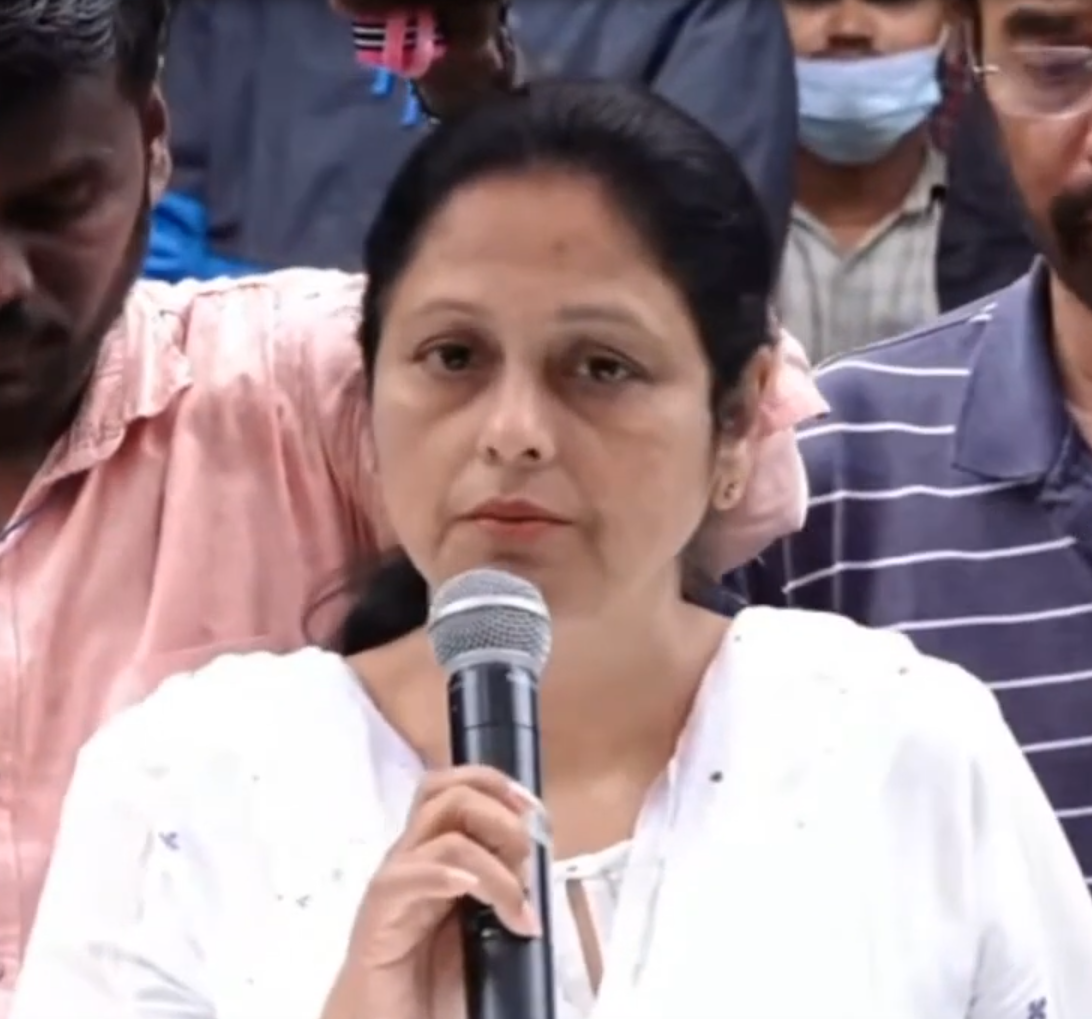
Jaya Sudha

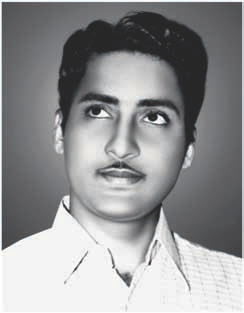
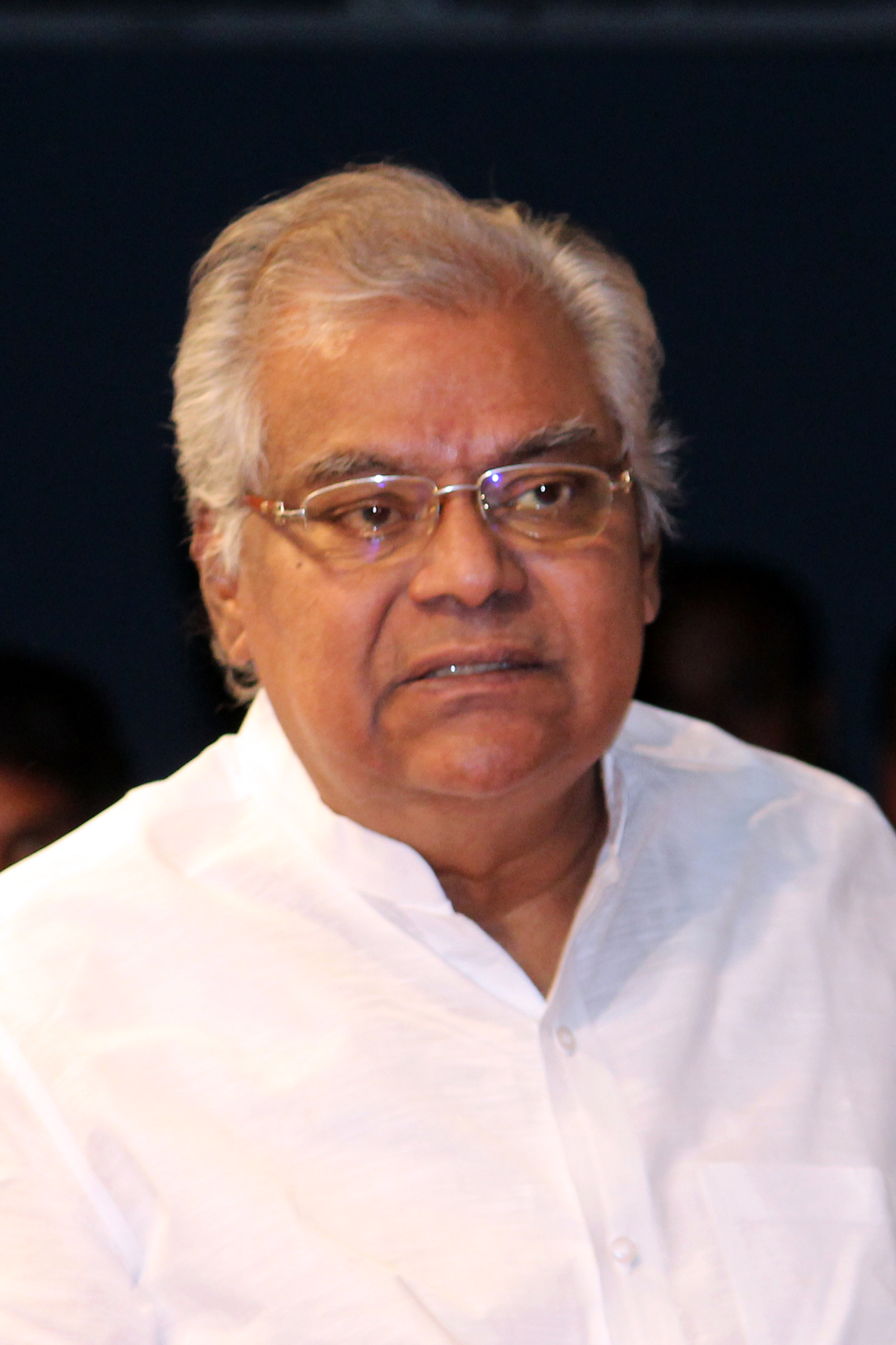
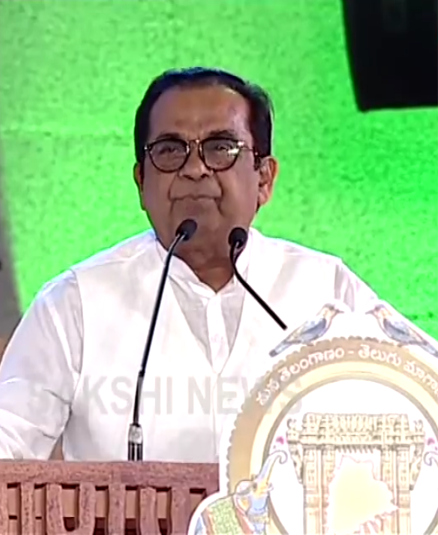
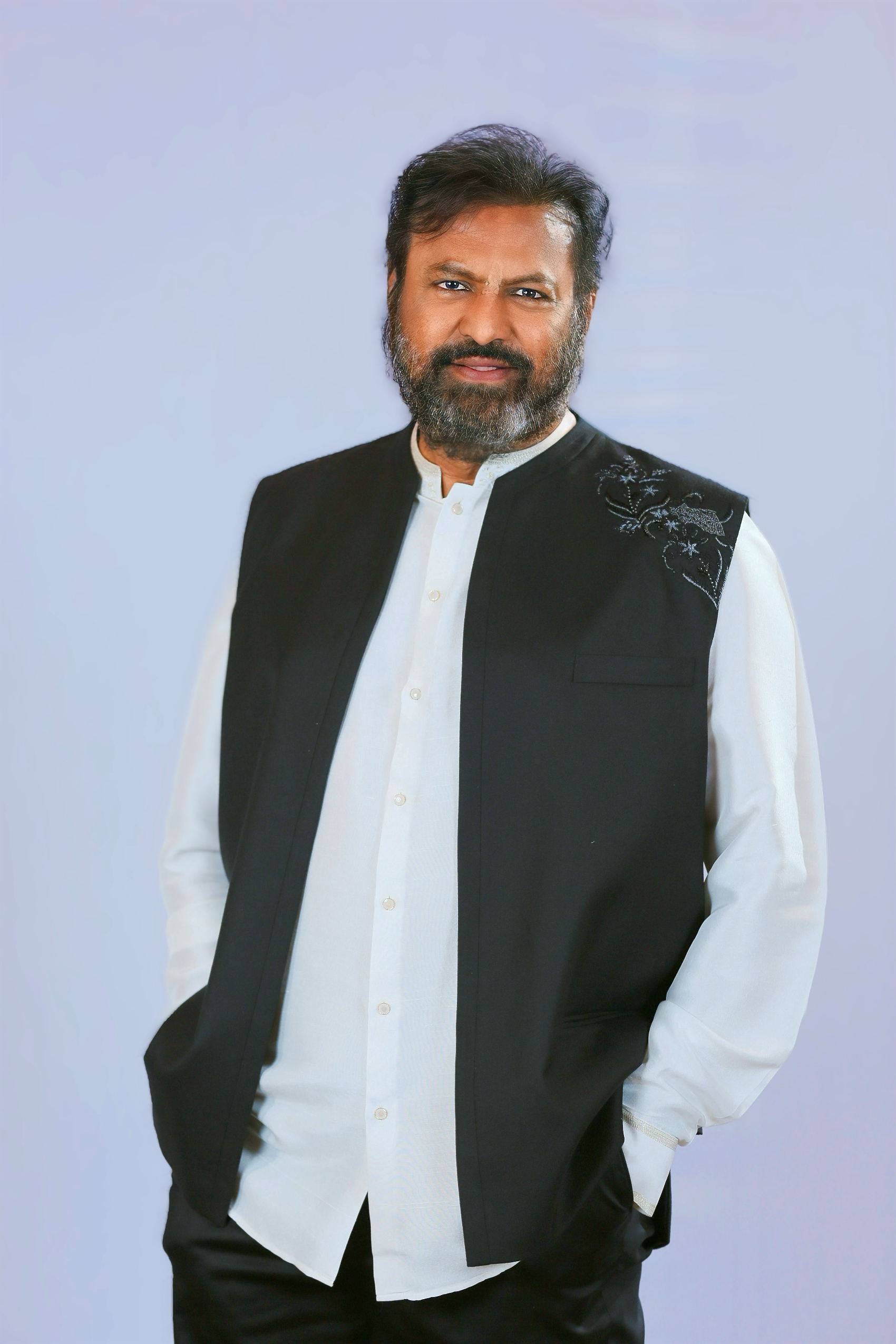
From left to right: Sobhan Babu, Kota Srinivasa Rao, Brahmanandam, and Mohan Babu

In the early days of Telugu cinema, theatre experience was a prerequisite for actors. In the 1930s, renowned stage actors with distinctive voices, such as Ballari Raghava and Santha Kumari, transitioned to the film industry. V. Nagayya was one of the most influential method actors of Indian cinema during crown rule. Vemuri Gaggayya, Kalyanam Raghuramayya, R. Nageswara Rao, Yadavalli Suryanarayana, C. H. Narayana Rao, Mudigonda Lingamurthy, were some of the finest actors during the early days of Telugu cinema.

With the introduction of playback singing, the necessity for actors to sing diminished, allowing talented stage actors with less singing ability, like Akkineni Nageswara Rao, N. T. Rama Rao, S. V. Ranga Rao, Relangi, Ramana Reddy, and C.S.R. Anjaneyulu to excel in cinema. S. V. Ranga Rao won the Best Actor Award for his portrayal of Kichaka in Nartanasala (1963) at the third Afro-Asian Film Festival held in Jakarta. On the female side, prominent actresses included Savitri, Bhanumathi, Girija, B. Saroja Devi, and Suryakantham.

Adurthi Subba Rao is recognised for steering Telugu cinema in a new direction and garnered seven National Film Awards, for his pioneering work on drama films. His films, Thene Manasulu (1965) and Kanne Manasulu (1966) introduced fresh faces to the industry and departed from the reliance on established stars. Subba Rao's success inspired other filmmakers to explore new talent, contributing to the industry's evolution.

K. N. T. Sastry and Pattabhirama Reddy have garnered international recognition for their works in neo-realistic cinema. A. Kutumba Rao is known for directing children's films such as Bhadram Koduko, Thodu, and Paatha Nagaramlo Pasivadu the latter winning Cairo International Film Festival's, Merit Certificate for best feature. A. Sreekar Prasad garnered pan-India recognition for film editing across multiple languages.

Krishna is credited with introducing several technological advancements and pioneering new genres in Telugu cinema. He produced the first full-length Cinemascope film, Alluri Seetarama Raju, and the first 70 mm film, Simhasanam. He also introduced the spy genre with Gudachari 116 and the cowboy genre with Mosagallaku Mosagadu to Telugu cinema.

Chiranjeevi, was listed among "the men who changed the face of the Indian Cinema" by CNN-IBN. Brahmanandam, holds a Guinness World Record for acting in the most films in the same language. Veteran actor Mohan Babu starred in more than 500 feature films in a variety of antagonist and leading roles. Vijayachander acted and produced hagiographical films, he esaayed "Jesus of Nazareth" in Karunamayudu (1978), "Sai Baba of Shirdi" in Sri Shirdi Saibaba Mahathyam (1986), "Vemana" in Vemana Charithra (1986), and "Saint Paul" in Dayamayudu (1987).

Sarada, Archana, Vijayashanti, Rohini, Keerthy Suresh, P. L. Narayana, Nagarjuna, and Allu Arjun received the National Film Award for acting.

=== Cinematography and visual effects ===
V. N. Reddy, K. S. Prasad, Jaya Gummadi, Sudhakar Yakkanti, K. K. Senthil Kumar, and C. Rajendra Prasad garnered pan India recognition for their cinematographic works. Enhanced technology among live action animation, digital compositing, and special effects paved the way for upgrading from established cinematic norms. Visual effects based high fantasy works have tasted success. Pete Draper, P. C. Sanath, Chakri Toleti and V. Srinivas Mohan supervise visual effects. Lok Singh, Hari Anumolu, S. Gopal Reddy, Chota K. Naidu, and P. S. Vinod fetched various state honours for their works in popular cinema.

=== Film critics and jury members ===
Vasiraju Prakasam and K. N. T. Sastry are one of the noted Indian film critics from the region. B. S. Narayana was a member of the Indian delegation to the Tashkent Film Festival in 1974, and the Moscow International Film Festival in 1975. Gummadi, served as official member of the Indian delegation from South India to the Tashkent Film Festival in 1978 and 1982. He served as the Jury Member thrice for the 28th, 33rd, and 39th National Film Awards. Chandra Siddhartha served in South Jury at the 57th, 61st and 65th National Film Awards, as well as the 49th IFFI.

=== Film Score and Lyrics ===
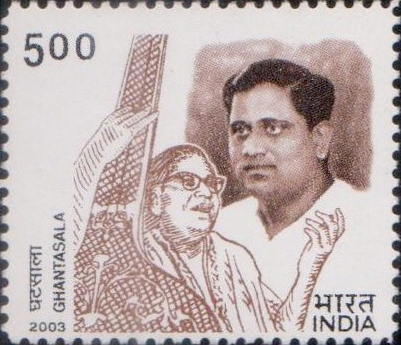
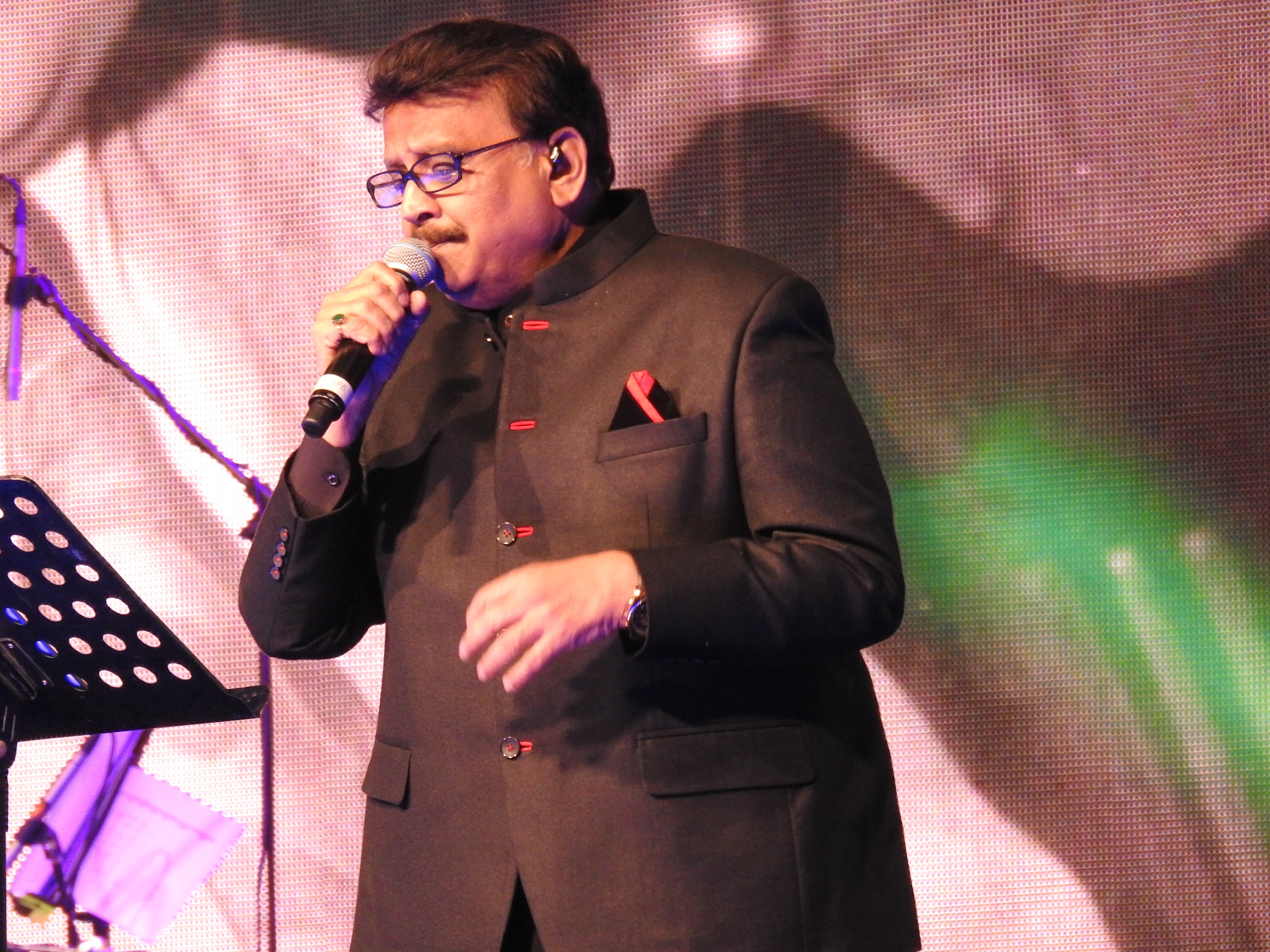
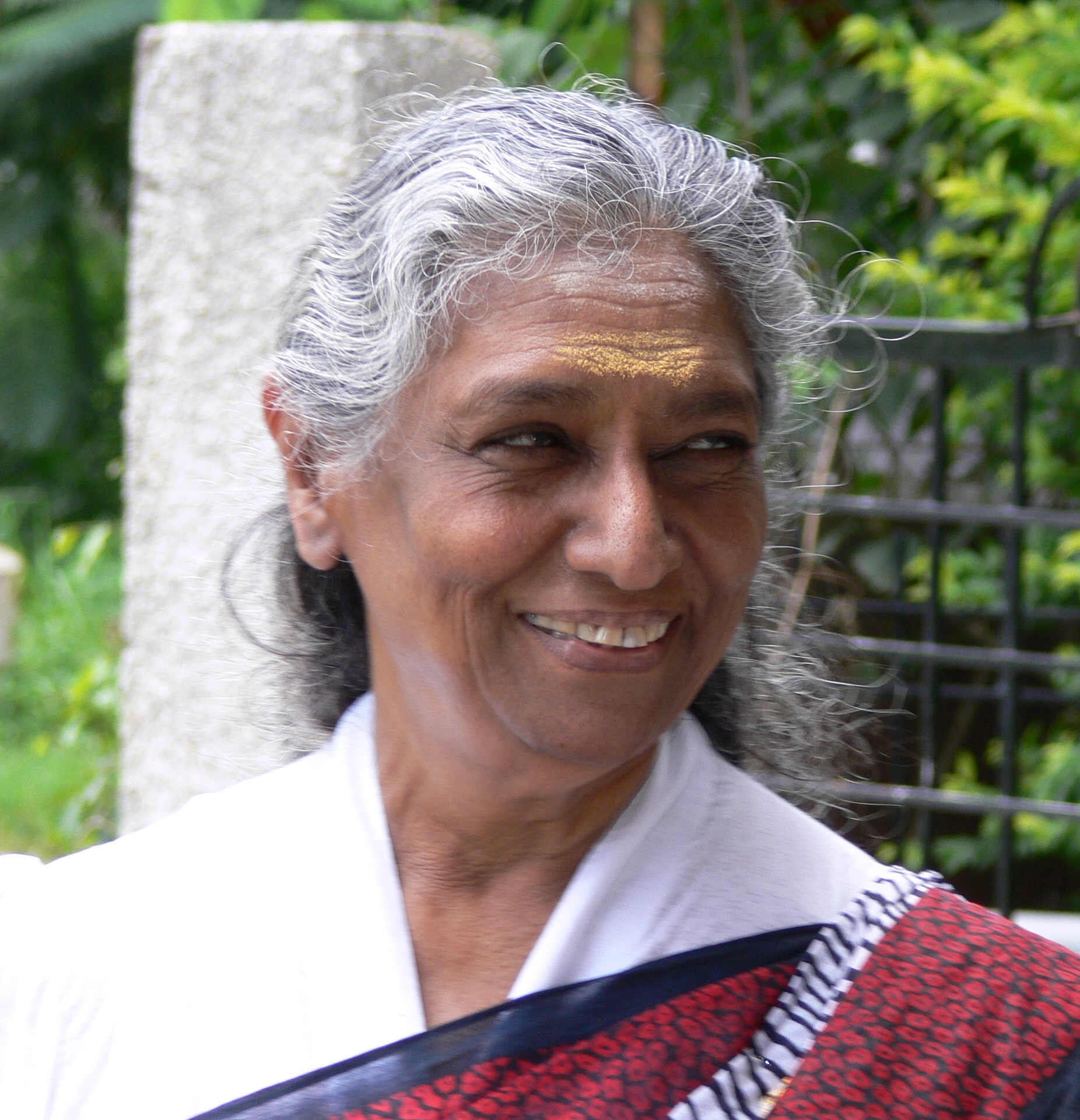
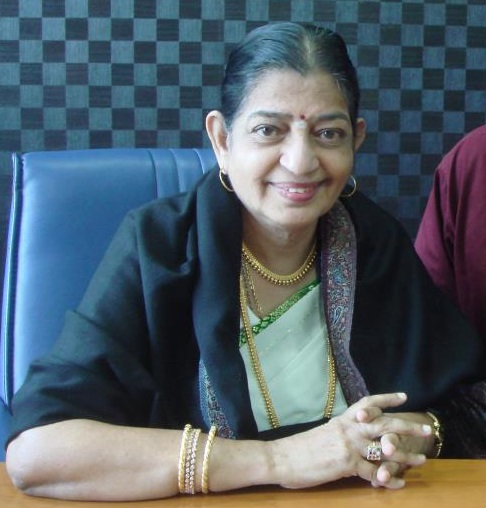
From top to bottom: Ghantasala on an Indian stamp, S. P. Balasubrahmanyam, S. Janaki, and P. Susheela

Italian explorer Niccolò de' Conti, who visited the Vijayanagara Empire during 15th-century, found that the words in the Telugu language follow a unique literary form that end with vowels, just like those in Italian, and hence referred to it as "The Italian of the East". Classical Telugu film scores were inspired by this literary form used by scholars like Gidugu Venkata Ramamoorty, Kandukuri Veeresalingam, and Gurajada Apparao.

S. Rajeswara Rao pioneered the use of light music in Telugu cinema; Rao's most rewarding assignments came from Gemini Studios, which he joined in 1940 and with which he remained for a decade. Ghantasala, performed in the United States, England, and Germany. According to The Hindu, and The Indian Express he was "Such a divine talent and with his songs he could move the hearts of the people. Ghantasala's blending of classical improvisations to the art of light music combined with his virtuosity and sensitivity puts him a class apart, above all others in the field of playback singing".

Susarla Dakshinamurthi, Parupalli Ramakrishnaiah Pantulu, Ogirala Ramachandra Rao, Pithapuram Nageswara Rao, Tanguturi Suryakumari, and Mangalampalli Balamuralikrishna are some of the influential music composers of Southern Indian cinema. Music composers such as Pendyala Nageswara Rao, R. Sudarshanam and R. Goverdhanam made contributions to folklore and mythological films.

Madhavapeddi Satyam, P. Adinarayana Rao, Gali Penchala Narasimha Rao, Satyam, P. B. Sreenivas, S. P. Kodandapani, G. K. Venkatesh, S. Hanumantha Rao, have contributed their work extensively for films containing themes of social relevance. S.P. Balasubrahmanyam is a multilingual playback singer from Telugu cinema to win National Film Awards across four languages. He holds the record of having recorded more songs than any other male playback singer and has received 25 state Nandi Awards.

P. Susheela, has been recognised by both the Guinness Book of World Records and the Asia Book of Records for singing most songs in Indian languages. She is also the recipient of five National Film Award for Best Female Playback Singer and numerous state awards. Works by S. Janaki, Ramesh Naidu, M. M. Keeravani, Chandrabose have received global recognition, the later fetching the Academy Award for Best Original Song, and the Golden Globe Award for Best Original Song in 2023 for "Naatu Naatu" from RRR. New age musicians Thaman S and Devi Sri Prasad received pan-Indian acclaim for works such as Ala Vaikunthapurramuloo (2020) and Pushpa: The Rise (2021) respectively.

K. S. Chitra has received highest Nandi awards for best female playback singer. Multi-instrumentalists duo Raj–Koti holds a notable career spanning a decade, the duo has garnered particular acclaim for redefining contemporary music. R. P. Patnaik is the current president of the Telugu Cine Music Association.

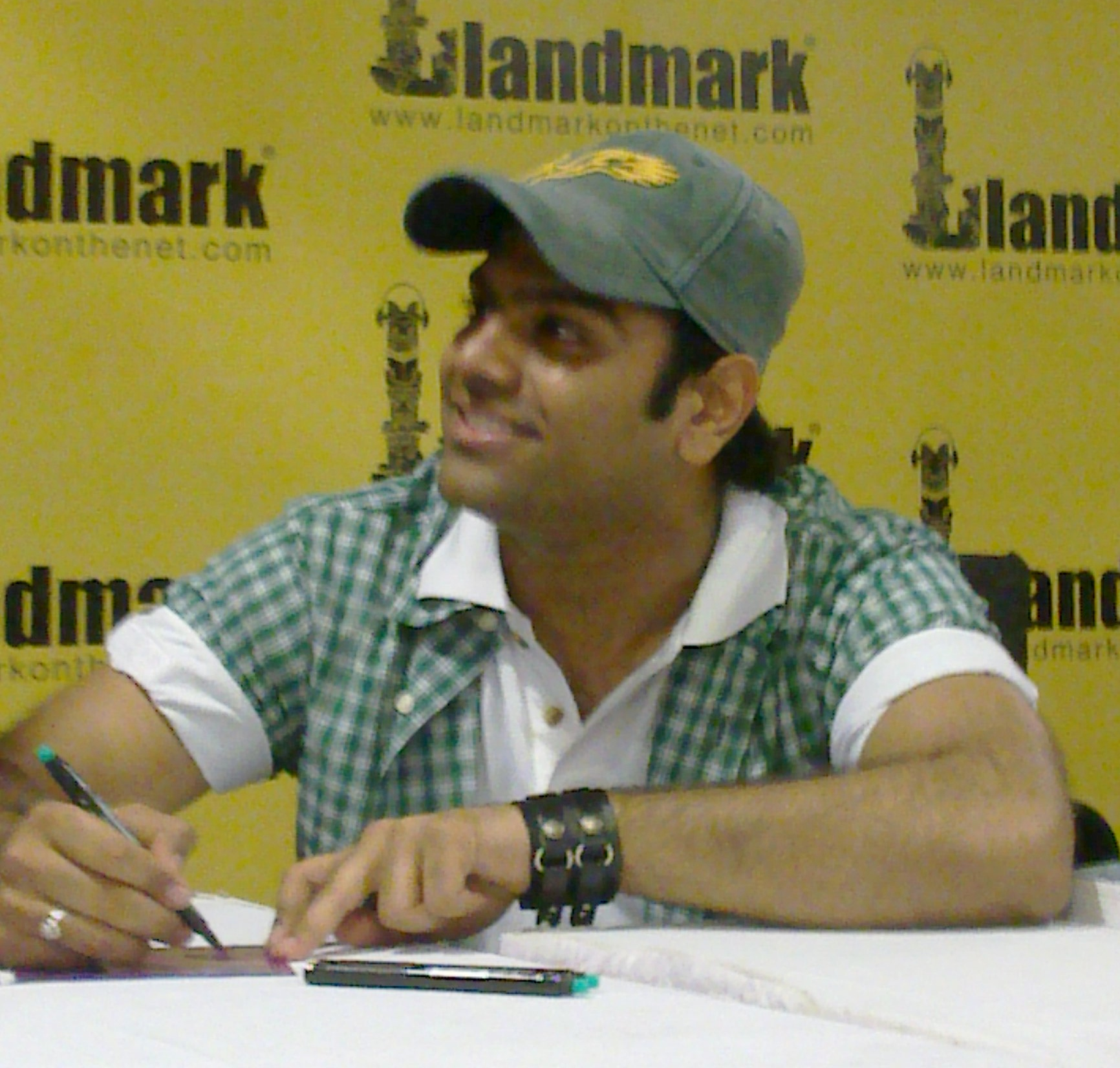
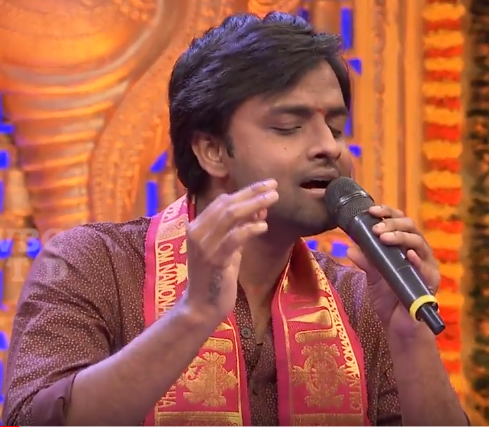
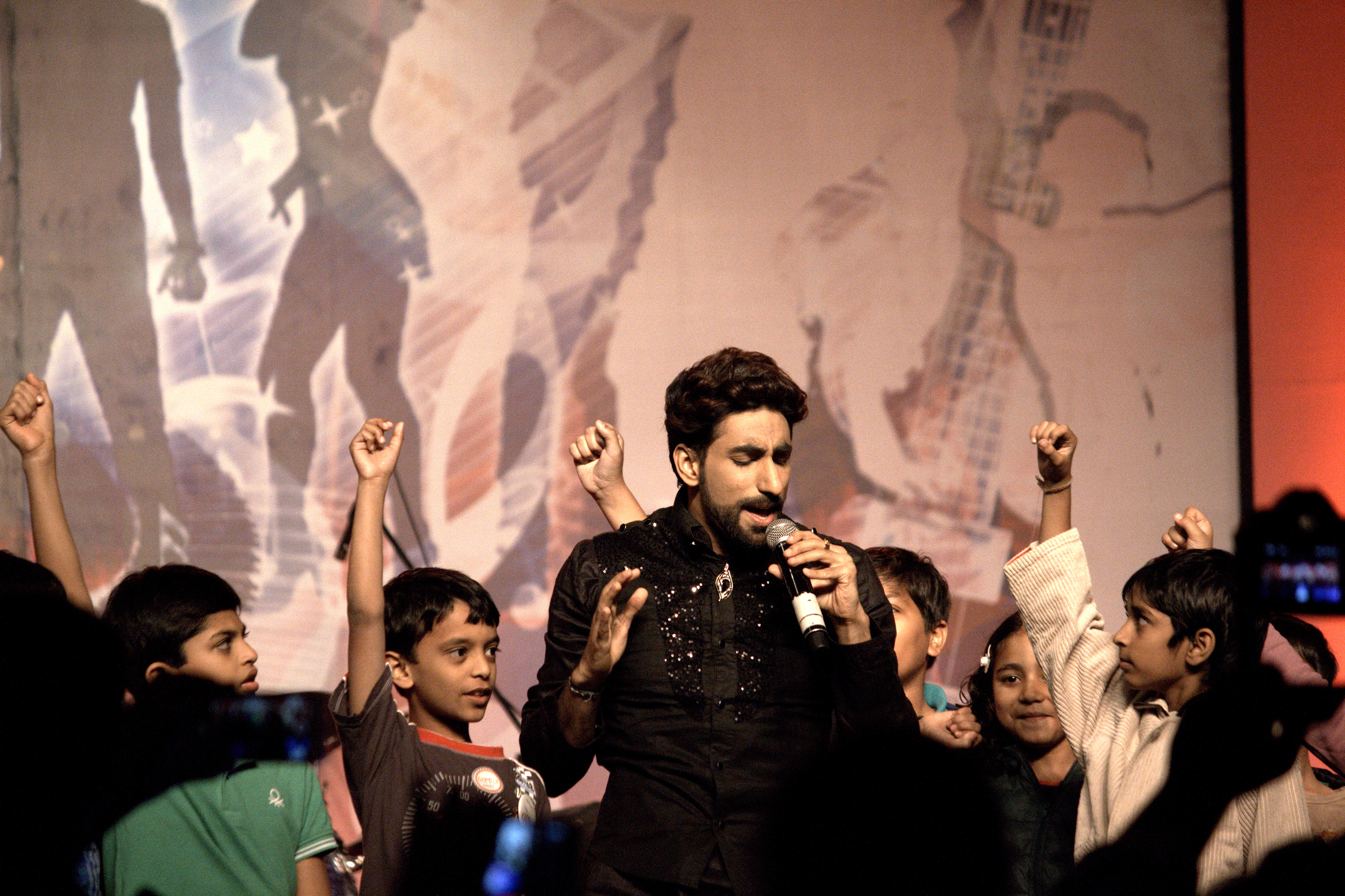
From left to right: Sreerama Chandra, Hema Chandra, and N. C. Karunya

Sri Sri was one of the influential film lyricists of his time, who garnered national honours such as Sahitya Akademi Award, Best Lyricist and Soviet Land Nehru Award for his pioneering work. Sirivennela Seetharama Sastry was a highly versatile film lyricist, known for his optimistic and motivational lyrics that captured the essence of life with simple yet impactful examples. He was recognised for writing lyrics across a wide range of genres, including duets, hero introductions, romantic, devotional, and thought-provoking songs.

== Guinness records ==
- As of 2005, Ramoji Film City, in Hyderabad held the record for the largest film studio complex in the world, measuring 674 hectares (1,666 acres). With 47 sound stages, it has permanent sets ranging from railway stations to temples.
- D. Rama Naidu holds the Guinness World Record as the most prolific producer with 130 films.
- Dasari Narayana Rao holds the Guinness World Record as the most films directed with 151 films.
- Brahmanandam holds the Guinness World Record for acting in the most films in a single language, 1000+ films.
- S. P. Balasubrahmanyam holds the Guinness World Record for having sung the most songs for any male playback singer in the world, with the majority of his songs sung in Telugu.
- Vijaya Nirmala holds a Guinness World Record as the female director with the most films, having made 47 films.
- In 2016, P. Susheela entered the Guinness Book of World Records for recording the highest number of songs in musical history.
- In 2024, Chiranjeevi has been recognised as the "Most Prolific Indian Film Star" by Guinness World Records.

== Dubbed films ==
The 1949 film Keelu Gurram was the first Telugu film to be dubbed into the Tamil language, being subsequently released under the name Maya Kudhirai. According to the Andhra Pradesh Film Chamber of Commerce, "as per the Judgement of Supreme Court in Ashirwad Films in W.P.(Civil) No.709 there will be no difference in taxation of films between the dubbed films coming in from other states and the films produced in the Telugu States".

== Distribution territories ==
The Telugu-speaking areas are broadly divided into three areas for the purposes of film distribution, namely, Nizam, Ceded and Andhra.

=== Domestic territories ===
Territory	Areas Included
Nizam	State of Telangana, along with two districts of Karnataka viz., Raichur and Koppal
Ceded	Eight districts of Rayalaseema region of Andhra Pradesh along with Bellary and Vijayanagar of Karnataka and Markapur revenue division of Prakasam district
Uttarandhra	Visakhapatnam district, Vizianagaram district, Srikakulam district, Parvathipuram Manyam district, Anakapalli district and parts of Alluri Sitharama Raju district of Andhra Pradesh
East	East Godavari district, Kakinada district, Konaseema district, parts of Alluri Sitharama Raju district of Andhra Pradesh and Yanam district of Puducherry
West	West Godavari district and parts of Eluru district of Andhra Pradesh
Krishna	Krishna district, NTR district and parts of Eluru district of Andhra Pradesh
Guntur	Guntur district, Bapatla district, Palnadu district and Ongole revenue division of Prakasam district of Andhra Pradesh
Nellore	Nellore district and parts of Tirupati district of Andhra Pradesh
Karnataka	State of Karnataka excluding districts of Raichur, Koppal, Bellary and Vijayanagar; but including the Krishnagiri district of Tamil Nadu
Tamil Nadu	State of Tamil Nadu including Pondicherry city, excluding Krishnagiri district
Kerala	State of Kerala including Mahé and Lakshadweep
Orissa	State Of Orissa
Mumbai	States of Maharastra, Gujarat and Goa
North/Rest of India	Hindi Belt Other North Indian states, North East India and including Andaman and Nicobar

From the above territories, Nizam and Karnataka are known for the highest earnings.

=== International territories ===
Territory	Areas Included
North America	United States, Canada, Mexico, Caribbean
UK & Europe	Europe including United Kingdom
South Africa	South Africa
UAE & GCC	United Arab Emirates and other Gulf Cooperation Council countries
Singapore	Singapore
Japan	Japan
China	China
Malaysia	Malaysia
Sri Lanka	Sri Lanka
South East Asia	Countries of Myanmar (Burma), Hong Kong, Indonesia
Oceania	Countries of Australia / New Zealand / Fiji / Papua New Guinea
Rest of the World	All other parts of the world excluding above territories

== Awards ==
=== Critics' Choice Movie Award for Best Foreign Language Film ===
Year	Film
2022	RRR

=== Saturn Award for Best International Film ===
Year	Film
2017	Baahubali 2: The Conclusion
2022	RRR

=== National Film Award for Best Feature Film ===
Year	Film	Note(s)
2015	Baahubali: The Beginning	National Film Award for Best Feature Film
1963	Nartanasala	National Film Award for Second Best Feature Film
1956	Tenali Ramakrishna	All India Certificate of Merit for Best Feature Film

=== National Film Award for Best Popular Film ===
Year	Film
1979	Sankarabharanam
1989	Geethanjali
2016	Sathamanam Bhavati
2017	Baahubali 2: The Conclusion
2019	Maharshi

=== Dadasaheb Phalke Award ===
Year	Recipient	Note(s)
1974	B. N. Reddy	Director and producer
1982	L. V. Prasad	Director and producer
1986	B. Nagi Reddy	Producer
1990	Akkineni Nageswara Rao	Actor
2009	D. Ramanaidu	Producer
2016	K. Viswanath	Director and actor

State awards

- Gaddar Awards
- Nandi Awards
- Raghupathi Venkaiah Award
- NTR National Award
- B. N. Reddy National Award
- S. V. Ranga Rao Award for Best Character Actor
- Akkineni Award for Best Home-viewing Feature Film
- Nagi Reddy Chakrapani National Award

Other major film awards

- Filmfare Awards South
- IIFA Utsavam
- South Indian International Movie Awards

Regional awards

- Sangam Academy Award
- Chittoor Nagayya Puraskaram
- CineMAA Awards
- Allu Ramalingaiah Award
- Gollapudi Srinivas Award
- B. Nagi Reddy Wholesome Entertainment Film
- Tollywood GAAMA Awards
- Gemini Ugadi Puraskaralu
- Hyderabad Times Film Awards
- Vamsee Berkely Awards
- Akruti Film Awards
- FNCC Awards
- Andhra Pradesh Film Journalist's Association Awards
- Santosham Film Awards
- T. Subbarami Reddy Award
- ANR National Award
- Sakshi Excellence Awards

== Studios ==
Major Filmmaking studios

- Ramanaidu Studios
- Saradhi Studios
- Ramakrishna Studios
- Padmalaya Studios
- Annapurna Studios
- Ramoji Film City

Visual effects and animation studios

- Prasad EFX – Magic in motion
- Pixelloid Studios
- Fire Fly Creative Studios
- Makuta VFX

== See also ==
- List of Indian winners and nominees of the Academy Awards
- List of Indian winners and nominees of the Golden Globe Awards
- List of highest-grossing Indian films
- List of South Indian film families
- List of silent films from South India
