= Gudavalli Ramabrahmam =

Indian film director (1898–1946)

- Born: 24 June 1898; Nandamuru, Krishna district, British India
- Died: 1 October 1946 (aged 48)
- Occupations: Fim director Screenwriter; Producer
- Spouse: Saradamba

Gudavalli Ramabrahmam was an Indian film director, screenwriter, and producer who worked in Telugu cinema. He is known for directing critically acclaimed social problem films like Mala Pilla (1938) and Raithu Bidda (1939). At a time when mythological films were ruling the roost, Ramabrahmam ushered in a new era in Telugu cinema by making films on contemporary social issues.

In 1937, he founded the film production company Sarathi Films along with Raja of Challapalli, Yaralagadda Sivarama Prasad. In 1945, he was elected as the chairman for South Indian Film Chamber of Commerce.

== Early life and career ==
Gudavalli Ramabrahmam was born in the village of Nandamuru, Krishna District in 1898 or 1902 to Gudavalli Venkayya and Bapamma. Viswanata Satyanarayana was also born in the same village. Ramabrahmam was educated in Indupalli, Gudivada, and Machilipatnam. He got married at the age of eighteen to Saradhamba. Later he gave up his education and joined the non-cooperation movement by burning foreign clothes in his father-in-law's house.

In 1924, he started “Friends and Co,” a stationery shop in Vijayawada. This store became a meeting place for artists and litterateurs like Basavaraju Apparao, Samudrala Raghavacharya, and Andhra University Vice-Chancellor Cattamanchi Ramalinga Reddy. In 1931, he became the Chairman of Andhra Farmers Meeting organizing committee. In 1934, he was elected as the secretary of Andhra Nataka Parishathu. He then worked as the editor of Prajamithra magazine in Madras.

He wrote Kammakula Charitra (transl. History of Kamma caste). He went to Kadapa to do research on Kamma caste. There, he did research on Gandikota and also wrote a play on the destruction of Gandikota titled Gandikota Pathanam which became very popular and was played in many cities.

Subsequently, he ventured into Telugu cinema, and founded the film production company Sarathi Films along with Raja of Challapalli, Yaralagadda Sivarama Prasad and worked as a production executive for the film Kanaka Tara. He then ventured into direction through the folklore film, Draupadi Vasthrapharanam (1936) under his home production. He then teamed up with producer P. V. Das and directed Sree Krishna Leelalu. He has also directed films like Mala Pilla (1938), Raithu Bidda (1939), Illalu (1940), Apavaadhu (1941), Pathni (1942), Panthulamma (1943), and Mayalokam (1945). He died on 1 October 1946. He was also the co-director for the film Palnati Yuddham (1947) which was later finished by L. V. Prasad due to his untimely death in 1946.

== Legacy ==
At a time when mythological films were ruling the roost, Ramabrahmam ushered in a new era in Telugu cinema by making films on contemporary social issues. The success of Malapilla kindled interest in other Telugu filmmakers to make films based on social themes. Malapilla also discarded the literary Telugu used in films until then and traded it for colloquial Telugu in its dialogue.

== Selected filmography ==
Year	Film	Notes	Ref.
1935	Sree Krishna Leelalu		
1936	Draupadi Vastrapaharanam	Production controller	
1938	Mala Pilla		
1939	Raithu Bidda		
1940	Illalu		
1941	Apavaadhu		
1942	Pathni		
1943	Panthulamma		
1945	Mayalokam		
1947	Palnati Yuddham	Co-director	
