= Sarathi Studios =

Indian film studio

Sri Sarathi Studios
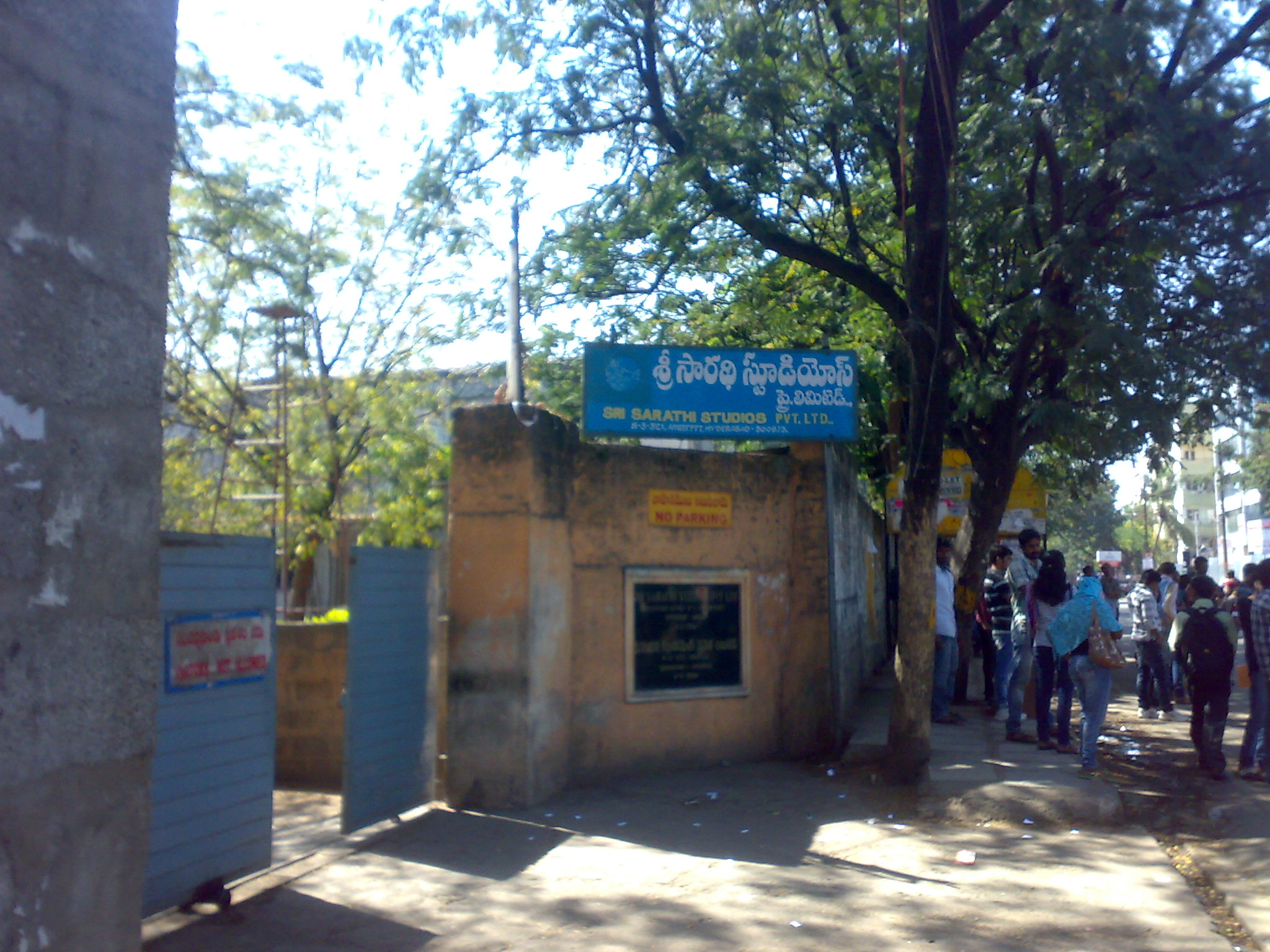
- Entrance to Sarathi Studios
- Type: Private
- Industry: Entertainment
- Founded: 1956
- Founder: Yarlagadda Sivarama Prasad
- Headquarters: Ameerpet, Hyderabad, India
- Key people: MSRV Prasad (chairman); Venkateswara Rao Kantamani (Director)
- Owner: Sri Sarathi Studios Pvt Ltd

Sri Sarathi Studios is a film studio facility located in Ameerpet, Hyderabad, India. Established in 1956, it was the first film studio facility in Hyderabad and was built by Yarlagadda Sivarama Prasad, the Raja of Challapalli. The first film shot in the studio was Maa Inti Mahalakshmi (1959), which also holds the distinction of being the first Telugu film entirely shot in Hyderabad.

In addition to its studio facilities, Sarathi also operated a film production division named Sarathi Films, founded in 1937. The division produced several notable films, including Mala Pilla (1938), Raithu Bidda (1939), Mayalokam (1945), Rojulu Marayi (1955), Kalasi Vunte Kaladu Sukham (1961), Aatmiyulu (1969), Annadammula Savaal (1978), Radha Kalyanam (1981), Moodu Mullu (1983).

== Sarathi Studios ==
=== Founding ===
Before Sarathi studios, Telugu cinema was based out of Madras (now Chennai) and most Telugu films were made in Madras. Hyderabad was known for Hindi film releases. Rojulu Marayi (1955) was released in Hyderabad and it ran for 100 days. At an event celebrating the film's success, the then Revenue Minister of Andhra Pradesh K. V. Ranga Reddy asked Telugu filmmakers to shift to Hyderabad from Madras.

In March 1956, Raja of Challapalli, Yarlagadda Sivarama Prasad, the producer of Rojulu Marayi heeded to Ranga Reddy's call and acquired 11.5 acres of land with a building in Hyderabad. The building was originally built in 1936 for Kishen Pershad, then prime minister of Hyderabad State. It was designed by architect Mohammad Fayazuddin. Fayazuddin later went on to design the State Bank of Hyderabad, Ravindra Bharathi and several other iconic public buildings.

Sivarama Prasad had also provided other facilities required for film shoots and established Sri Sarathi Studios as the first film studio complex in Hyderabad. The art deco building designed by Fayazuddin in 1936 is now at the heart of the studio complex. Sivarama Prasad's brother Yarlagadda Rama Krishna Prasad acted as the managing director and chairman of the Studio. He took the technical inputs of famous cinematographer and technician CVVR Prasad in constructing Saradhi Studios. In 1959, the first film made at the studio Maa Inti Mahalakshmi released in theatres. It was also the first Telugu film to be completely filmed in Hyderabad.

=== Change in management ===
In 1966, the management of the studio was passed over to Katragadda Srinivasa Rao, the head of Navayuga Films. He managed the studio for over 40 years.

The studio is now being managed by MSRV Prasad who took it over in 2006. At the time of its purchase in 1956, the area was 11.5 acres; it has shrunk to about six acres by 2018. It serves as a location for television shows, serials, post-production work, dubbing and other aspects of filmmaking. The studio was modernised with a new animation studio, digital intermediate lab, editing suits, and digital marketing division. The renovated Sarathi Studios was inaugurated in March 2016 with attendance from veteran filmmakers Dasari Narayana Rao, K. Viswanath, and K. Raghavendra Rao.

=== Recent technical upgrade into a modern Post-Production facility ===
Recently, the studio was upgraded to a high-end tech destination along with a modernized shooting facility. It features 6 massive shooting floors, air-conditioned floors, vast indoor shooting locations, an advanced Virtual Production stage using LED screens and Unreal Engine and a newly constructed advanced and complete post-production studio. The post-production studio features state-of-the-art facilities for VFX, large Digital Intermediate (DI) suites using BaseLight and Barco Laser projectors, advanced audio labs and a next-gen audio mixing suite using 48-channel Dolby Atmos. It was the 24th Dolby Atmos feature mix facility of Dolby India and the largest in the states Telangana and Andhra Pradesh.

=== Films shot at Sarathi Studios ===
- Maa Inti Mahalakshmi (1959)
- Murali Krishna (1964)
- Preminchi Choodu (1965)
- Navarathri (1966)
- Bangaru Gajulu (1968)
- Pelli Choopulu (1982)
- Gabbar Singh (2012)
- Janatha Garage (2016)
- Yatra (2019)
- Guntur Kaaram (2024)

== Sarathi Films ==
Sarathi Films
- Type: Private
- Industry: Entertainment
- Founded: 1937
- Founder: Yarlagadda Sivarama Prasad; Yarlagadda Rama Krishna Prasad; Gudavalli Ramabrahmam
- Headquarters: India
- Products: Films
- Services: Film production

Sarathi Films was a film production company set up by Raja of Challapalli, Yarlagadda Sivarama Prasad in partnership with his brother Yarlagadda Rama Krishna Prasad and Gudavalli Ramabrahmam in 1937. Rama Krishna Prasad acted as the managing director for Sarathi Films. It produced many notable films like Mala Pilla (1938), Raithu Bidda (1939), Mayalokam (1945), Rojulu Marayi (1955), Kalasi Vunte Kaladu Sukham (1961), Aatmiyulu (1969), Annadammula Savaal (1978), Radha Kalyanam (1981), Moodu Mullu (1983).

Sarathi Films produced the debut directorial ventures of noted directors L. V. Prasad and Tapi Chanakya. Waheeda Rehman and singer Master Venu were introduced to Telugu cinema by Sarathi Films. Rama Krishna Prasad produced many films on Navayuga banner in association with Katragadda Srinivasa Rao.

=== Films produced by Sarathi Films ===
- Mala Pilla (1938)
- Raithu Bidda (1939)
- Panthulamma (1943)
- Mayalokam (1945)
- Gruhapravesam (1946)
- Antha Manavalle (1954)
- Rojulu Marayi (1955)
- Peddarikalu (1957)
- Bhagya Devatha (1959)
- Kunkuma Rekha (1960)
- Kalasi Vunte Kaladu Sukham (1961)
- Aatma Bandhuvu (1962)
- Aatmiyulu (1969)
- Iddaru Asadhyule (1979)
- Annadammula Savaal (1978)
- Seethe Ramudaithe (1980)
- Radha Kalyanam (1981)
- Moodu Mullu (1983)
- Jailu Pakshi (1986)
