= Kalasi Vunte Kaladu Sukham =

- Theatrical release poster
- Directed by: Tapi Chanakya
- Written by: Acharya Aatreya (dialogues)
- Screenplay by: Tapi Chanakya
- Story by: M. S. Solamalai
- Based on: Bhaaga Pirivinai (1959)
- Produced by: Y. Rama Krishna Prasad; C. V. R. Prasad
- Starring: N. T. Rama Rao; Savitri
- Cinematography: Yusaaf Muulji
- Edited by: A. Sanjeevi
- Music by: Master Venu
- Production company: Saradhi Studios
- Release date: 8 September 1961
- Running time: 192 minutes
- Country: India
- Language: Telugu

Kalasi Vunte Kaladu Sukham (transl. There will be happiness if you live together) is a 1961 Indian Telugu-language drama film, produced by Y. Rama Krishna Prasad and C. V. R. Prasad under Saradhi Studios and directed by Tapi Chanakya. It stars N. T. Rama Rao and Savitri, with music composed by Master Venu. The film is a remake of the Tamil film Bhaaga Pirivinai (1959). The film was a box office success.

== Cast ==
- N. T. Rama Rao as Kishtaiah
- Savitri as Radha
- S. V. Ranga Rao as Pattabhi Ramaiah
- Haranath as Raghu Ram
- Relangi as Rangoon Raja
- Allu Ramalingaiah as Hanuman
- Perumallu as Sundara Ramaiah
- Suryakantham as Sowbhagyam
- Girija as Janaki
- Hemalatha as Ramanamma
- Rama Devi as Manju
- Padmini Priyadarshini as Anarkali

== Soundtrack ==
Kalasi Vunte Kaladu Sukham

Film score by Master Venu
- Released: 1961
- Genre: Soundtrack
- Length: 35:03
- Producer: Master Venu

Music composed by Master Venu.

S. No	Song title	Lyrics	Singers	length
1	"Gana Nathuni"	Kosaraju	Ghantasala, P. Susheela	4:12
2	"Veeradhi Veerulake"	Kosaraju	Ghantasala, P. Susheela	6:38
3	"Mudda Banthi"	Kosaraju	Ghantasala, P. Susheela	6:40
4	"Kalasi Vunte Kaladu Sukham"	Kosaraju	Ghantasala, P. Susheela	3:26
5	"Melimi Bangaru"	Aarudhra	P. Susheela	3:44
6	"Aatala Teerulu"	Sri Sri	K. Jamuna Rani, Satya Rao	6:01
7	"Naavaraala Thandri"	Aarudhra	Ghantasala	3:33
8	"Oka Talliki"	Kosaraju	Ghantasala, P. Susheela	0:49
