= Yarlagadda Sivarama Prasad =

Indian film producer and politician

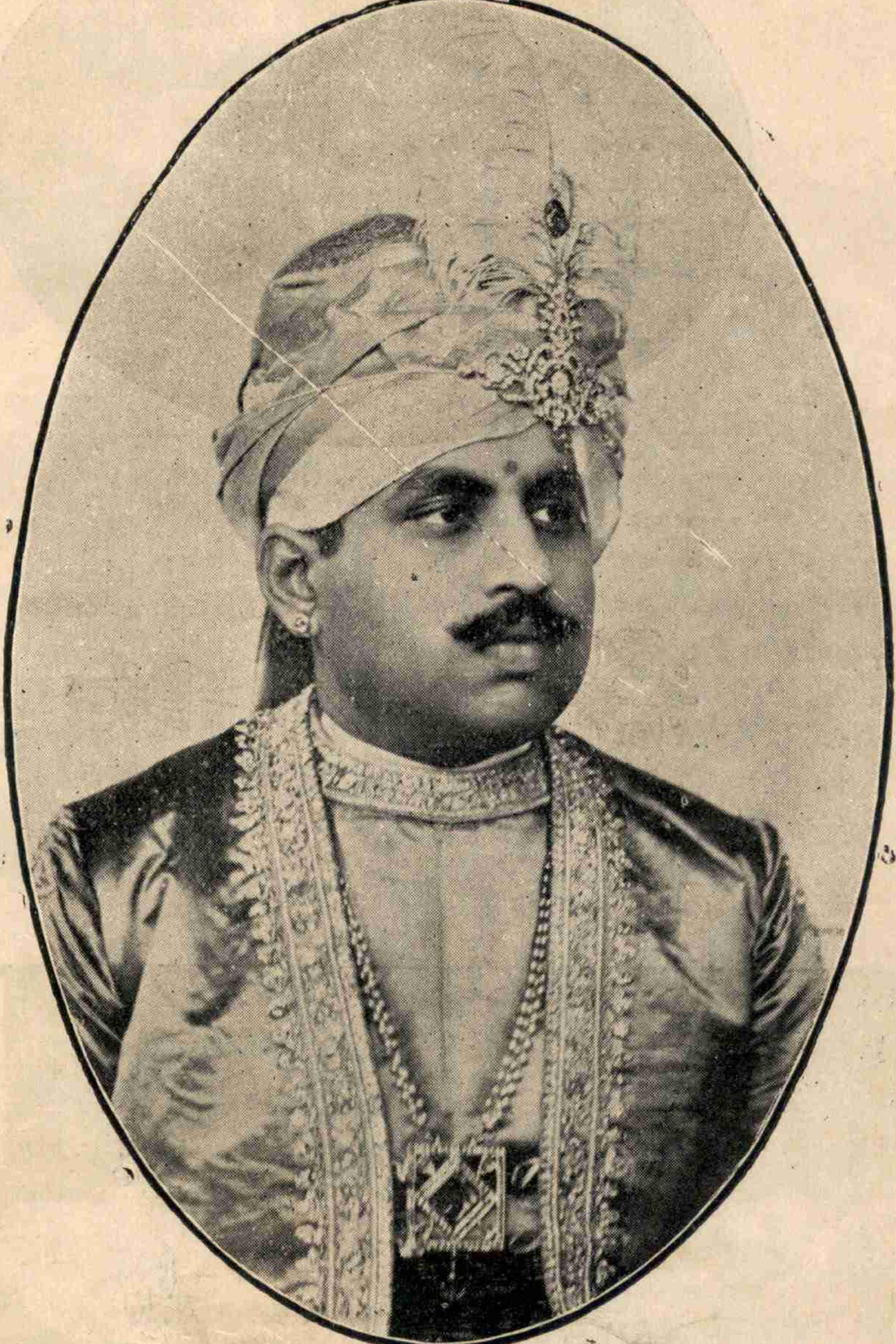
- Profile picture of Challapalli Zamindar
- Born: 3 April 1903; Challapalli, British India (present-day Krishna district, Andhra Pradesh, India)
- Died: 1976 (aged 72 or 73)
- Other names: Srimantu Raja Yarlagadda Sivarama Prasad Bahadur, Challapalli Raja
- Occupations: Zamindar, politician, and industrialist
- Title: Raja of Challapalli

Yarlagadda Sivarama Prasad (3 April 1906 - 1976), also known as Challapalli Raja, was an Indian aristocrat, industrialist, politician, film producer, and film studio owner. He was the last hereditary zamindar of the Challapalli Samasthanam (estate) which compromises the modern day region of Diviseema / Avanigadda Assembly constituency .

In politics, Sivarama Prasad was affiliated with the Justice Party before Independence and with Indian National Congress afterwards. He served as the Minister of Health for Andhra Pradesh during the 1960s and was elected as an MLA from Krishna District.

Sivarama Prasad financed Pattabhi Sitaramayya's Andhra Bank. He set up the production company Sarathi Films in 1938, which produced successful films like Mayalokam (1945) and Rojulu Marayi (1955). He also established the film studio complex Sarathi Studios in Hyderabad in 1956. It was the first film studio facility built in Hyderabad.

== Early life ==
Yarlagadda Sivarama Prasad was born to Raja Yarlagadda Ankineedu Prasad, the ruler of the Challapalli Samasthanam (estate), and his wife on 3 April 1906. The Challapalli Samasthanam was one of the largest in the Madras State and consisted of towns in Diviseema and other coastal parts of Krishna District surrounding Machilipatnam. Sivarama Prasad had a brother, S. R. Y. Ramakrishna Prasad and a sister named Rajya Lakshmamma, who later married the Raja of Muktyala. Sivarama Prasad was crowned on 26 December 1929, an event attended by many Telugu and Sanskrit scholars who advised the new zamindar on how to manage the estate's affairs.

== Career ==
Yarlagadda Sivarama Prasad was the last zamindar of the Challapalli Samasthanam to be crowned. His tenure saw the estate hit with communist-peasant rebellions, and the agitations were particularly intense in the Challapalli Estate. The peasantry in the Challapalli Samasthanam occupied thousands of acres of land owned by Sivarama Prasad, but the Congress-backed police aided the zamindar in putting down the rebellion. Sivarama Prasad was the hereditary trustee of several Hindu temples in Krishna District, a patron of Kuchipudi classical dance, and he patronized Sanskrit by establishing new educational institutes.

In the financial and industrial sector, Sivarama Prasad financed Bhogaraju Pattabhi Sitaramayya's Andhra Bank. He also set up Sarathi Films in 1938, which produced many successful films like Mayalokam (1945) and Rojulu Marayi (1955). Following the success of the latter film, Sivarama Prasad used the money to buy twelve acres of land with a building in Hyderabad owned by Kishen Pershad, the prime minister of Hyderabad State, to build a film studio in 1956. He also financed a sugar mill in Challapalli.

n politics, Sivarama Prasad was affiliated with the Justice Party before Independence and with Indian National Congress afterwards. He was the Minister of Health for Andhra Pradesh during the 1960s and was elected as an MLA from Krishna District.

== Titles ==
Sivarama Prasad carried the hereditary title Srimant, given to his ancestors by the Peshwas of the Maratha Empire. Other titles he held were Raja, Bahadur, and Zubdatul Aqran. These three were conferred on his family by the Mughal Emperors.

== Legacy ==
The town of Sivarampuram in Diviseema is named after him. Srimantu Raja Yarlagadda Sivarama Prasad Junior College in Challapalli is also named after him. Some of his descendants are settled in Coimbatore and visit Challapalli for yearly Hindu Rituals.
