= Rojulu Marayi =

1955 film by Tapi Chanakya

- Theatrical release poster
- Directed by: Tapi Chanakya
- Screenplay by: Kondepudi Lakshminarayana; Tapi Chanakya; C. V. R. Prasad
- Story by: Kondepudi Lakshminarayana
- Produced by: C. V. R. Prasad; Y. Ramakrishna Prasad (Presenter)
- Starring: Akkineni Nageswara Rao; Sowcar Janaki
- Cinematography: Kamal Ghosh
- Edited by: Tilak; Akkineni Sanjeevi
- Music by: Master Venu
- Production company: Saradhi Studios
- Release date: 14 April 1955
- Running time: 190 minutes
- Country: India
- Language: Telugu

Rojulu Marayi (transl. The days have changed) is a 1955 Indian Telugu-language drama film directed by Tapi Chanakya. It stars Akkineni Nageswara Rao and Sowcar Janaki, with music composed by Master Venu. The film was produced by C. V. R. Prasad on Sarathi Films banner.

The story is set in a native village environment and portrays the changing times. The film is the debut of Waheeda Rehman in the film industry. Rojulu Marayi was released on 14 April 1955. The film ran for over 25 weeks in theatres, thereby becoming a silver jubilee film, and was remade in Tamil as Kaalam Maari Pochi (1956). Rojulu Marayi is considered as a milestone among social films in Telugu cinema.

== Cast ==
Film cast is referenced from The Hindu article.

- Akkineni Nageswara Rao as Venu
- Sowcar Janaki as Radha
- C. S. R as Sagarayya
- Relangi as Polayya
- Ramana Reddy as Karanam Sambayya
- Perumallu as Kotayya
- Seetaram as Ratnam
- Vallam Narasimha Rao as Gopalam
- A. V. Subba Rao Jr. as District Collector
- C. Hemalatha Devi as Venu's mother
- Ammaji as Bharathi
- Waheeda Rehman as a dancer in the song "Eruvaaka Sagaroranno Chinnanna"

== Production ==
Sixteen years after making Raithu Bidda (1939), a film which dealt with the hardships faced by poor peasants under the zamindari rule, the production house Sarathi Films decided to make another film dealing with similar issues, titled Rojulu Marayi. The producer of the film was C. V. R. Prasad, who also wrote the screenplay with Kondepudi Lakshminarayana and Tapi Chanakya, who was named director. The cinematography was handled by Kamal Ghosh, and editing by Tilak and Akkineni Sanjeevi. Filming took place prominently at the Dandimitta village.

When shooting for the film was almost complete, Prasad felt that a celebration song set after the film's harvest scene would add colour to the black-and-white film. Lyricist Kosaraju remembered a song he had written for producer Thottempudi Ramayya's shelved film Paleru, that was composed by Venu. Chanakya and Prasad liked the lyrics and the tune, and Vedantam Jagannatha Sarma suggested Waheeda Rehman, then a dancer, to the makers. She was signed on a remuneration of ₹500 (equivalent to ₹59,000 or US$610 in 2026) for being the dancer in the song, "Eruvaaka Sagaro Ranno Chinnanna", and Rojulu Marayi thus marked her feature film debut.

== Soundtrack ==
The soundtrack was composed by Master Venu. "Eruvaaka Sagaroranno Chinnanna" was inspired by the folk song "Ayyo Koyyoda", popularised by Valluri Jagannatha Rao. It was later adapted into many other songs, such as "Summa Kidantha Sothuku Nashtam" in the Tamil film Madurai Veeran (1956) and "Dekhne Me Bhola Hai Mera Salona" in the Hindi film Bombai Ka Babu (1960).

Song title	Lyrics	Singers	Length
"Oliyo Oli Oliyo Oli"	Kosaraju	Ghantasala	1:57
"Idiye Haayi Kalupumu"	Tapi Dharma Rao	Ghantasala, Jikki	2:56
"Eruvaaka Sagaroranno Chinnanna"	Kosaraju	Jikki	5:19
"Randayya Podamu"	Kosaraju	Ghantasala	3:23
"Maaraju Vianavayya"	Tapi Dharma Rao	Ghantasala, Jikki	4:12
"Chirunavvulu Virise"	Tapi Dharma Rao	Ghantasala, Jikki, Krishna Kumari	3:58
"Ellipotundi Elli"	Tapi Dharma Rao	Pithapuram	3:40

== Release and reception ==
Rojulu Marayi was released on 14 April 1955. The film ran for over 25 weeks in theatres, thereby becoming a silver jubilee film. Its 100th day functions were held in the Hyderabad-based Rajeswar theatre and K. V. Ranga Reddy, then the Deputy Chief Minister of Andhra Pradesh, presided over the function. The film was later remade in Tamil as Kaalam Maari Pochi (1956), where "Eruvaaka Sagaroranno Chinnanna" was re-used as "Yerupooti Povaye Anne Sinnanne", with Waheeda Rehman returning as dancer.

== Bibliography ==
- Rajadhyaksha, Ashish; Willemen, Paul (1998) [1994]. Encyclopaedia of Indian Cinema. British Film Institute and Oxford University Press. ISBN 0-19-563579-5.
