= Challapalli =

- Village
- Interactive map of Challapalli
- Location in Andhra Pradesh, India
- Coordinates: 16.1167°N 80.9333°E
- Country: India
- State: Andhra Pradesh
- District: Krishna
- Mandal: Challapalli

Area
  - Total: 4.66 km^{2} (1.80 sq mi)
- Elevation: 7 m (23 ft)

Population (2011)
  - Total: 17,067
  - Density: 3,660/km^{2} (9,490/sq mi)

Languages
  - Official: Telugu
- Time zone: UTC+5:30 (IST)
- PIN: 521126
- Telephone code: 08671
- Vehicle registration: AP16, AP39 (new)
- Parliament constituency: Machilipatnam

Challapalli (officially known as Challapalle) is a village in the Krishna district of the Indian state of Andhra Pradesh. It is located in Challapalli mandal, Machilipatnam revenue division. Tollywood actor Nani is native of this village. In March 2026, 5-6 police personnel were injured when firecrackers exploded at Challapalli police station.

== Geography ==
Challapalli is located at 16.1167°N 80.9333°E. It has an average elevation of 7 metres (23 ft). It is located 25 kilometres (16 mi) from the district headquarters, Machilipatnam, and lies on the border of the Krishna District and the Guntur district near Repalle, in the South Guntur District.

== Demographics ==
According to the 2011 Census of India, Challapalli had a population of 17,069 inhabitants: 8,183 males and 8,884 females. It has an average gender ratio of 1,086 females per 1,000 males, which is higher than the national average of 940 per 1,000. The average literacy rate stands at 83.28%, significantly higher than the national average of 73.00%.

== History ==
In the early 18th century, the Raja of Challapalli, Yaralagadda Ankineedu Prasad built Challapalli palace. The village was developed around the palace and became the capital for the Devarkota Estate. The last crowned monarch of Challapalli was Yarlagadda Sivaram Prasad (1906–1976). As of 2012, the royal family members no longer reside in the fort.

Yarlagadda Rajas of the Challapalli fort and Zamindari were the rulers in this area from the 15th century until recently when the Kingdom was disbanded due to the land Cease Act of the Indian Government.

== See also ==
- Villages in Challapalli mandal
