= Missamma (soundtrack) =

- Cover of the Telugu version

Soundtrack album by S. Rajeswara Rao
- Released: 21 September 1955
- Recorded: 1954–1955
- Studio: Western Electric
- Genre: Film soundtrack
- Length: 32:25
- Language: Telugu
- Label: His Master's Voice
- Producer: S. Rajeswara Rao

S. Rajeswara Rao chronology
Vipra Narayana (1954)	Missamma (1955)	Bala Sanyasamma Katha (1956)

Missamma is the soundtrack of the 1955 Indian Telugu-language film of the same name directed by L. V. Prasad. Composed by S. Rajeswara Rao, the soundtrack contains 11 songs with lyrics by Pingali. The film was written by Chakrapani, who co-produced it with B. Nagi Reddi for Vijaya Productions. N. T. Rama Rao and Savitri played the lead roles in the Telugu version, with Akkineni Nageswara Rao, Jamuna, S. V. Ranga Rao, Rushyendramani, Relangi and Ramana Reddy in supporting roles.

Until Bhanumathi was replaced by Savitri as the female lead, she was planned to provide vocals for her character in the film. After Bhanumathi left, P. Leela was chosen as Savitri's playback singer. Unlike their previous films, Vijaya Productions preferred A. M. Rajah over Ghantasala to sing for Rama Rao in the Telugu version. Chakrapani chose P. Susheela to sing the remaining two songs featuring Jamuna, and Venkata Ramaiah sang two uncredited songs.

The soundtrack album was released by His Master's Voice on 21 September 1955. Although Rajeswara Rao was initially unhappy with his work, feeling that it was primarily influenced by Chakrapani, the soundtrack was critically and commercially successful. Missamma was released simultaneously in Tamil as Missiamma with a different cast; the same soundtrack was used, with lyrics by Thanjai N. Ramaiah Dass. The Tamil soundtrack, released a month later by His Master's Voice, also received similar critical acclaim.

== Development ==
S. Rajeswara Rao composed the soundtrack and background score, collaborating with Pingali and Thanjai N. Ramaiah Dass on the lyrics for the Telugu and Tamil versions of the film respectively. The mixing was supervised by A. Krishnan and Siva Ram. It was processed by N. C. Sen Gupta and orchestrated by A. Krishnamurthy. Missamma was written by Aluri Chakrapani (who co-produced the film with B. Nagi Reddy for Vijaya Vauhini Studios) and directed by L. V. Prasad. The film starred N. T. Rama Rao and Savitri, with Akkineni Nageswara Rao, Jamuna, S. V. Ranga Rao, Rushyendramani, Relangi and Ramana Reddy in supporting roles. The Tamil version had a slightly-different cast.

When Nagi Reddy told Bhanumathi that P. Leela would sing for her character, Bhanumathi (also a playback singer) refused to let anyone else sing for her. After Bhanumathi left the project, Leela was signed to sing for Savitri. Unlike their previous films, Vijaya Vauhini Studios preferred A. M. Rajah over Ghantasala to sing for Rama Rao in the Telugu version. Rajeswara Rao, who collaborated with Raja on vocals for Nageswara Rao in Vipra Narayana (1954), took Rama Rao's approval before recording the songs. Chakrapani chose P. Susheela to sing the remaining two songs featuring Jamuna after he was impressed with her rendition of "Anuragam Virisena" in the film Kanna Talli (1953). Although Susheela had recorded for Donga Ramudu (1955) first, Missamma was released earlier and was her breakthrough as a singer. "Ariya Paruvamada" and its Telugu version, "Balanura Madana", were Susheela's first songs for Rajeswara Rao. Despite singing "Dharmam Chey" and "Sitaram Sitaram", Relangi Venkata Ramaiah was uncredited as a playback singer.

"Ravoyi Chandamama" is based on the Abheri raga. "Balanura Madana" is based on the Kharaharapriya raga, and "Telusukonave Yuvathi" is based on the Mohanam raga. "Brundavanamadi Andaridi" (its bridge in particular) is primarily based on the Shuddha Saveri raga, although an occasional gandhara note suggests the Arabhi raga. It was the soundtrack's last song to be recorded, since Chakrapani rejected several of Rajeswara Rao's versions. When the vexed Rajeswara Rao asked Chakrapani to suggest a tune, he referred to a folk song he had heard as a child. Pingali was inspired by the line "A thing of beauty is a joy forever" from John Keats' "Endymion" for the song's phrase, "Andamulandari Aanandamule" ("Beauty gives joy to all").

== Release and reception ==
The Telugu soundtrack was released on 21 September 1955, and the Tamil version was released on 21 October 1955; both were marketed by His Master's Voice. The Telugu soundtrack's album cover features Jamuna and Savitri, each tugging on one of Rama Rao's hands. Rajeswara Rao's eldest son, musician Ramalingeswara Rao, said in an interview with The Hindu that his father was initially unhappy with Missamma's music because he had to cater to Chakrapani (who had his own view of mainstream cinema). Rao said that his father was afraid of failure and rejection by filmmakers, and wanted to leave for Vizianagaram before the soundtrack's success.

The soundtrack was a commercial success, with "Adavari Matalaku Ardhale Verule" in particular becoming a classic romantic song. According to M. L. Narasimham of The Hindu, Rajeswara Rao's music and Pingali's "situational" lyrics were major contributors to the film's commercial success. Narasimham praised "Brundavanamadi Andaridi" in particular: "Pingali’s lyric and Saluri’s melodious score breathed life into the voices of P. Susheela and A. M. Raja [sic]".

A 26 January 1955 Andhra Patrika reviewer called Rajeswara Rao's soundtrack "soothing", and praised his ability to tune "Brundavanamadi Andaridi"'s uneven background properly. A Kinima magazine reviewer praised Pingali's lyrics in its February 1955 issue, saying that they were in tune with the situations the characters went through and "sarcastic enough, in sync with the film's tone". The reviewer praised Rajeswara Rao's music as "easily acceptable by all the sectors of the audience".

== Legacy ==
According to M. L. Narasimham, "Brundavanamadi Andaridi"'s popularity made it a part of music lessons for children in Telugu-speaking regions. For "Sundarangulanu Choosina Velana" in the 1959 film Appu Chesi Pappu Koodu (also produced by Vijaya Vauhuni Studios), Rajeswara Rao re-used the melody of "Brundavanamadi Andaridi" at Chakrapani's insistence – a rare example of the composer recycling an earlier song. Pingali wrote that song's lyrics, and Ghantasala provided the vocals with Leela and Rajah.

Leela sang songs from Missamma at her concerts, to popular acclaim. "Njaan Ariyathen", from the Malayalam film Jailppulli (1957), is loosely based on "Brundavanamadi Andaridi". "Adavari Matalaku Arthale Verule" was remixed by Mani Sharma with no changes to its melody and lyrics for the Telugu film Kushi (2001). It was sung by Korivi Muralidhar, who was known as Kushi Murali after the success of the remixed version. "Brundavanamadi Andaridi" was adapted by Hemanta Mukherjee as "Brindavan Ka Krishan Kanhaiya" for Missamma's Hindi remake, Miss Mary (1957).

== Track listing ==
All lyrics are written by Pingali, except where noted.

Track list
No.	Title	Singer(s)	Length
1.	"Raaga Sudharasa" (Written by Tyagaraja)	P. Leela, Jikki	02:26
2.	"Dharmam Chey"	Relangi	02:30
3.	"Adavari Matalaku Arthale Verule"	A. M. Rajah	02:21
4.	"Balanura Madana"	P. Susheela	03:16
5.	"Telusukonave Chelli"	P. Leela	04:58
6.	"Telusukonave Yuvathi"	A. M. Rajah	02:51
7.	"Karuninchu Mary Maathaa"	P. Leela	02:30
8.	"Ee Navanavabhyudaya"	A. M. Rajah	03:04
9.	"Brundavanamadi Andaridi"	A. M. Rajah, P. Susheela	02:56
10.	"Ravoyi Chandamama"	A. M. Rajah, P. Leela	02:54
11.	"Yemito Ee Maaya"	P. Leela	02:39
Total length:			32:25

== Bibliography ==
- Baburao, V. (18 May 2005). మిస్సమ్మ - నిరుద్యోగ సమస్యపై వ్యంగ్యాస్త్రం [Missamma – A satire on Unemployment] (in Telugu). Navya Weekly. Archived from the original on 7 June 2015.
