= Raitu Bidda =

Raitu Bidda, Raithu Bidda or Raitubidda is the name of a few Telugu films.

- Raithu Bidda (1939 film) directed by Gudavalli Ramabrahmam.
- Raitu Bidda (1971 film) directed by B. A. Subba Rao.
