= Chenchu Lakshmi =

Chenchu Lakshmi may refer to:

- An epithet of the Hindu goddess Lakshmi, the supreme goddess of Vaishnavism
- Chenchu Lakshmi (1943 film), an Indian Telugu-language film by S. Saundara Rajan
- Chenchu Lakshmi (1958 film), an Indian Telugu-language film by B. A. Subba Rao
