= Desa Drohulu =

- Movie Poster
- Directed by: Bolla Subba Rao
- Written by: Sri Giriraj Rama Rao; Aarudhra; Sadasivabrahmam (dialogues)
- Screenplay by: Bolla Subba Rao
- Story by: Sairam
- Produced by: Bolla Subba Rao
- Starring: N. T. Rama Rao; Devika; Kanta Rao
- Cinematography: Bolla Subba Rao; Varadarajan
- Edited by: Jagadish; Narasimha Rao
- Music by: S. Rajeswara Rao
- Production company: Sri Rama Pictures
- Release date: 7 May 1964
- Running time: 174 minutes
- Country: India
- Language: Telugu

Desa Drohulu (transl. Traitors) is a 1964 Indian Telugu-language action drama film, produced and directed by Bolla Subba Rao under the Sri Rama Pictures banner. It stars N. T. Rama Rao, Devika and Kanta Rao, with music composed by S. Rajeswara Rao.

== Cast ==
- N. T. Rama Rao as Ramu
- Devika as Leela
- Kanta Rao as Raghu
- Rajanala as Jogindra
- Relangi as Gopi
- Ramana Reddy as Abbadhaiah
- Mikkilineni as Bhujanga Rao
- Dhulipala as Police Commissioner
- Shobhan Babu as CBI Officer
- Ramakrishna as CBI Officer
- Satyanarayana as Police Inspector
- Raja Babu as Devaiah Shetty
- Perumallu as Ramanna
- Malladi as Police Inspector
- Sowcar Janaki as Karuna
- Girija as Radha
- Geetanjali as Dancer
- Malathi as Ramu's mother
- Gemini Chandra as Mala
- Baby Indrani as Vaani

== Soundtrack ==
Desa Drohulu

Film score by S. Rajeswara Rao
- Released: 1964
- Genre: Soundtrack
- Length: 34:24
- Label: His Master's Voice
- Producer: S. Rajeswara Rao

S. Rajeswara Rao chronology
Pooja Phalam (1964)	Desa Drohulu (1964)	Manchi Manishi (1964)

Music composed by S. Rajeswara Rao. The music was released on His Master's Voice.

S. No.	Song title	Lyrics	Singers	length
1	"Naatho Nuvvu Aadali"	Aarudhra	Swarnalata, Sarojini	3:03
2	"Jagame Maarinadi"	Aarudhra	Ghantasala, P. Susheela	3:45
3	"Oo Rangula Guvva"	Malladi Ramakrishna Sastry	Pithapuram	3:42
4	"Sagamapa Gari"	Malladi Ramakrishna Sastry	Madhavapeddi Satyam, S. Janaki	3:10
5	"Yichate Pondavoyi"	Aarudhra	S. Janaki	3:24
6	"Dayasalulara"	Malladi Ramakrishna Sastry	Ghantasala, Vasantha & Party	3:54
7	"Mana Swatantra Bharatham"	Malladi Ramakrishna Sastry	Ghantasala, Madhavapeddi Satyam	6:11
8	"Yemi Naa Neram"	Aarudhra	P. Susheela	3:19
9	"Chikkevule Dora"	Malladi Ramakrishna Sastry	Pithapuram, S. Janaki	3:56
