= Missamma (disambiguation) =

Missamma is a 1955 Telugu film.

Missamma may also refer to:

- Missamma (soundtrack), a soundtrack album from the 1955 film
- Missamma (2003 film), a Telugu film\

== See also ==
- Maisamma, a Hindu folk goddess
- Maisamma IPS, a 2008 Indian Telugu film
- Missiamma, a 1955 Tamil film
