= Master Venu =

- Born: Madduri Venugopal; 1916
- Died: 8 September 1981 (aged 64–65)
- Genre: Indian film scores
- Occupation: Composer
- Instrument: Harmonium
- Years active: 1950s–1970s

Madduri Venugopal better known as Master Venu (1916–1981) was an Indian music composer of the Telugu and Tamil cinemas. He was the father of the actor Bhanu Chander. He was born in 1916 in Machilipatnam, Andhra Pradesh, India and died in 1981 in Chennai, Tamil Nadu.

== Filmography ==
Year	Film	Language	Director	Co-Music Directors
1938	Mala Pilla	Telugu	Gudavalli Ramabrahmam	Bhimavarapu Narasimha Rao
1945	Valmiki	Telugu	Ellis R. Dungan	
1950	Vali Sugreeva	Telugu	Jampana	Gali Penchala Narasimha Rao, S. Rajeswara Rao, Ghantasala & Pendyala Nageswara Rao
1954	Antha Manavaalle	Telugu	Tapi Chanakya	
1955	Beedhala Aasthi	Telugu	D. L. Ramachander	
1955	Rojulu Marayi	Telugu	Tapi Chanakya	
1955	Ardhangi	Telugu	P. Pullayya	Bhimavarapu Narasimha Rao & A. Rama Rao
1956	Kaalam Maari Pochu	Tamil	Tapi Chanakya	
1956	Pennin Perumai	Tamil	P. Pullayya	Bhimavarapu Narasimha Rao & A. Rama Rao
1956	Edi Nijam	Telugu	S. Balachander	
1956	Edhu Nijam	Tamil	S. Balachander	
1957	Peddarikalu	Telugu	Tapi Chanakya	
1957	Todi Kodallu	Telugu	Adurthi Subba Rao	
1957	Engal Veettu Mahalakshmi	Tamil	Adurthi Subba Rao	
1957	Sati Savitri	Telugu	K. B. Nagabhushanam	M. Balamuralikrishna, Mallik, P. Suribabu, Baburao, J. Lakshminarayana, H. R. Padmanabha Sastry & S. Rajeswara Rao
1958	Aada Pettanam	Telugu	Adurthi Subba Rao	S. Rajeswara Rao
1958	Etthuku Pai Etthu	Telugu	Tapi Chanakya	
1959	Bhagya Devatha	Telugu	Tapi Chanakya	
1959	Bhagya Devathai	Tamil	Tapi Chanakya	
1959	Mangalya Balam	Telugu	Adurthi Subba Rao	
1959	Manjal Mahimai	Tamil	Adurthi Subba Rao	
1959	Naatukoru Nallaval	Tamil	K. Dasaratha Ramaiah	
1959	Pennkulathin Ponvilakku	Tamil	B. Vittalacharya	
1960	Nammina Bantu	Telugu	Adurthi Subba Rao	S. Rajeswara Rao
1960	Pattaliyin Vetri	Tamil	Adurthi Subba Rao	S. Rajeswara Rao
1960	Jalsa Rayudu	Telugu	Tapi Chanakya	
1960	Kula Daivam	Telugu	G. Kabirdas	
1960	Kumkuma Rekha	Telugu	Tapi Chanakya	
1960	Pudhiya Pathai	Tamil	Tapi Chanakya	
1960	Raja Makutam	Telugu	B. N. Reddy	
1960	Raja Makudam	Tamil	B. N. Reddy	
1961	Kalasi Vunte Kaladu Sukham	Telugu	Tapi Chanakya	
1961	Batasari	Telugu	P. S. Ramakrishna Rao	
1961	Kaanal Neer	Tamil	P. S. Ramakrishna Rao	
1961	Pelli Kaani Pillalu	Telugu	C. S. Rao	
1962	Siri Sampadalu	Telugu	P. Pullayya	
1963	Irugu Porugu	Telugu	I. N. Murthy	
1963	Somavara Vratha Mahathyam	Telugu	R. M. Krishna Swamy & Nanduri Nammalvar	
1964	Murali Krishna	Telugu	P. Pullayya	
1965	Pratignapalana	Telugu	C. S. Rao	
1965	Preminchi Choodu	Telugu	P. Pullayya	
1966	Adugu Jaadalu	Telugu	Tapi Chanakya	
1968	Bharya	Telugu	K. S. Prakash Rao	
1968	Kalisina Manasulu	Telugu	Kamalakara Kameswara Rao	
1968	Vintha Kapuram	Telugu	Abbi	
1968	Nindu Samsaram	Telugu	C. S. Rao	
1969	Ardharathiri	Telugu	P. Sambasiva Rao	
1969	Bommalu Chepinna Katha	Telugu	G. Vishwanath	
1970	Aadajanma	Telugu	I. S. Moorthi	
1970	Thupaki Rangadu	Telugu	Aamancharla Seshagiri Rao	Satyam
1970	Vidhi Vilasam	Telugu	Tapi Chanakya	
1972	Attanu Diddina Kodalu	Telugu	B. S. Narayana	
1974	Uthama Illalu	Telugu	P. Sambasiva Rao	
1976	Andharu Bagundali	Telugu	P. Pullayya	
1976	Dhana Dharmalu	Telugu	Kondisetty Srirama Rao	
1976	Vadhuvarulu	Telugu	N. D. Vijaya Babu	
1978	Melu Kolupu	Telugu	B. V. Prasad	
1979	Maavari Manchitanam	Telugu	B. A. Subba Rao	
1980	Maa Inti Devatha	Telugu	Padmanabham	
1980	Mohanaragam	Telugu	Y. R. Babu	
