= L. Vijayalakshmi =

Indian actress and classical dancer

- Born: Lakshmanan Vijayalakshmi; 5 May 1944; Tinnevelly, Madras Province, British India (now Tirunelveli, Tamil Nadu, India)
- Other names: L. Vijayalakshmi, Vijayalakshmi, Viji, Vijayalakshmi Datta
- Occupations: Actress, Indian Classical Dancer, Budgeting Officer in Virginia Polytechnic University
- Years active: 1959-1969
- Spouse: Surajit Kumar De Datta (m. 1969)
- Children: Raj Kumar (b.1970)
- Parent: Lakshmanan (father) Kanthimathi (mother)

Lakshmanan Vijayalakshmi is an Indian actress and classical dancer who was active from 1959 to 1969. She appeared in Malayalam, Tamil, Kannada, Telugu and Hindi films.

== Early life and training ==
"I remember I used to take bus route 21C to Ramayya Pillai house. Often lessons went on for six hours. E. V. Saroja was learning from him too that time."

— Suganthy Krishnamachari

Vijayalakshmi was born to Tamil parents Kanthimathi (a Veenaist) and Lakshmanan on 5 May 1944 in present-day Tirunelveli, Tamil Nadu. Her family then moved to Poona, Bombay Province (now Pune, Maharashtra). There, at six years of age, Vijayalakshmi was inspired by the dancing styles of Vyjayanthimala, Lalitha and Padmini at the South Indian Association; she eventually started to practice dance in the backyard of her house.

Vijayalakshmi's father noticed her talent for dancing and sent her to a mentor, Sukumara Pillai.

Vijayalakshmi's first performance was at a temple in Andhra Pradesh when she was nine years old. When Vijayalakshmi needed advanced dance training in the discipline of Bharathanatyam, her family moved to Madras. They lived in South Mada Street, Mylapore and Vijayalakshmi was mentored by Kamala.

Then, quite by accident when walking near the Kapaleeswarar Temple, Vijayalakshmi met K. J. Sarasa, who sent her to the dance teacher, Vazhuvoor Ramaiah Pillai. E. V. Saroja was also his student. Ten months later, on 28 October 1955, Vijayalakshmi made her debut at the Rasika Rajya Sabha, a cultural organisation.

Vijayalakshmi was not from a wealthy family. She had only one costume for the three-hour performance. The family could not offer more than tea as refreshments to the audience, and there were no printed invitations. Despite these disadvantages, the concert was well attended. Vijayalakshmi was introduced by E. Krishna Iyer, a classical artist. The filmmaker, V. Shantaram and the dance exponent, Kamala Lakshmanan, were in attendance.

Following her debut, Vijayalakshmi was offered employment at no less than four cultural organisations (sabha). However, her teacher suggested she advance her dance skills through tuition with T. K. Swaminatha Pillai.

== Acting career ==
Vijayalakshmi's film debut was S. K. Chaari's Marumakal (1952). In 1959, she acted in a character role and danced in the Telugu-language film Sipayi Kuthuru. This involved training and performing in a modified classical dance style. Vijayalakshmi's beauty and dance skill made her suitable for that and other films of the time, and she became well known. She was cast with NTR, ANR and other well-known performers.

Vijayalakshmi was also cast in a few Malayalam language movies. Three of these were with Prem Nazir. In some of these films she was cast with Jnana Sundari, Laila Majnu, and Sathya Bhama.

In Tamil films, Vijayalakshmi was cast with actors such as M. G. Ramachandran, Sivaji Ganesan, S.S. Rajendran , Jaishankar, Gemini Ganesan, R. Muthuraman, and Ravichandran.

Many of Vijayalakshmi's films include the Bhangra dance form. One such film is Kudiyirundha Koyil, which features the song, Aadaludan Paadalai Kettu Rasipathilethan Sugam Sugam, with MGR in her partner role.

Vijayalakshmi's Tamil language film debut was Paadhai Theriyudhu Paar (1960), and she also acted in "Aalukkoru Veedu". Although it won a National Film Award for Best Feature Film in Tamil, the movie was not a commercial success. Some suggested Vijaylakshmi should have danced in this movie, but the director indicated she had not because her character did not know how to dance.

In 1964, Vijayalakshmi was cast in the S. Balachander movie Bommai, a Tamil suspense thriller. It was shown for at least a hundred days in Madras theatres. Ooty Varai Uravu (1967) directed by C.V. Sridhar was one of her most popular Tamil movies.

== Personal life ==
In 1969, while shooting Ooty Varai Uravu, Vijayalakshmi married her brother's friend, Surajit Kumar De Dutta, an agricultural scientist working in Philippines. After getting married, Vijayalakshmi took the Benares Hindu matriculation exam as a private candidate. She then completed Bcom in Madras University through correspondence. In 1969, she moved to Manila, Philippines. In 1977, when Morarji Desai, the prime minister of India (1977 - 1979) visited Manila, the Indian Embassy asked Vijayalakshmi to dance at an official function. In 1991, Vijayalakshmi moved to the United States. She became an auditor and was employed as a budgeting officer at Virginia Polytechnic University.

She pursued Masters in Accounting and CPA (Certified Public Accounting) in Virginia Polytechnic Institute and State University (in Blacksburg, Virginia), commonly known as Virginia Tech. Now she is residing Davis, California where her only son has a software company in Silicon Valley.

== Filmography ==
Year	Title	Role	Language	Notes
1959	Sipayi Kuthuru		Telugu	Debut Film
1959	Panchaali		Tamil	
1960	Kavalai Illaadha Manithan	Sevvanthi	Tamil	
1960	Aalukkoru Veedu		Tamil	
1960	Petra Manam		Tamil	
1960	Kuravanji		Tamil	
1960	Bhaktha Sabari		Tamil	
1960	Paadhai Theriyudhu Paar		Tamil	
1960	Kalathur Kannamma	Dancer	Tamil	
1960	Ponni Thirunaal	Dancer	Tamil	"Nattukor Thandhaiyadi" dance
1961	Jagadekaveeruni Katha		Telugu	
1961	Batasari		Telugu	
1961	Jnaanasundari		Malayalam	
1961	Marutha Nattu Veeran	Dancer	Tamil	
1961	Kanaal Neer	Dancer	Tamil	
1961	Thayilla Pillai	Suguna	Tamil	
1961	Ennai Paar		Tamil	
1962	Aradhana		Telugu	
1962	Mahamantri Timmarusu		Telugu	
1962	Gundamma Katha	Padma	Telugu	
1962	Srikakula Andhra Maha Vishnu Katha		Telugu	
1962	Laila Majnu		Malayalam	
1962	Manithan Maravillai	Padma	Tamil	
1962	Mahaveera Bheeman		Tamil	
1962	Sumaithaangi	Babu's sister	Tamil	
1963	Nartanasala	Uttarā	Telugu	
1963	Irugu Porugu		Telugu	
1963	Punarjanma		Telugu	
1963	Snapaka Yohannan		Malayalam	
1963	Sathyabhaama		Malayalam	
1963	Koduthu Vaithaval	Nalini	Tamil	
1963	Kaithiyin Kathali		Tamil	
1964	Pooja phalam		Telugu	
1964	Babruvahana		Telugu	
1964	Bobbili Yuddham		Telugu	
1964	Murali Krishna		Telugu	
1964	Ramudu Bheemudu		Telugu	
1964	Shabnam		Hindi	
1964	Bommai	Mallika	Tamil	
1964	En Kadamai		Tamil	
1965	Vijaya Simha		Telugu	
1965	Antastulu		Telugu	
1965	Aakasaramanna	Kalavathi	Telugu	
1965	Mangamma Sapatham		Telugu	
1965	Pandava Vanavasamu	Sasirekha	Telugu	
1965	Satya Harishchandra		Telugu	
1965	Satya Harishchandra		Kannada	
1965	Enga Veetu Pillai	Dancer	Tamil	"Kangalum Kavadi Sinthagattum"
1965	Oru Viral		Tamil	
1965	Aayirathil Oruvan	Pirate captain's wife	Tamil	
1965	Panchavarna Kili	Dancer	Tamil	"Azhagan Muruganidam"
1965	Kakkum Karangal	Vijayalakshmi	Tamil	
1966	Paramanandayya Sishyula Katha		Telugu	
1966	Zamindar		Telugu	
1966	Palnati Yuddham	Subbai	Telugu	
1966	Pidugu Ramudu		Telugu	
1966	Aata Bommalu		Telugu	
1966	Sangeeta Lakshmi		Telugu	
1966	Sri Krishna Tulabharam		Telugu	
1966	Srikakula Andhra Maha Vishnu Katha		Telugu	Second adaptation
1966	Husn Aur Ishq		Hindi	
1966	Baadal		Hindi	
1966	Alibaba and the Forty Thieves		Hindi	
1966	Vallavan Oruvan	Thara	Tamil	
1966	Naam Moovar		Tamil	
1966	Mahakavi Kalidas		Tamil	
1966	Iru Vallavargal	Rani	Tamil	
1967	Ummadi Kutumbam		Telugu	
1967	Bhama Vijayam		Telugu	
1967	Nindu Manasulu		Telugu	
1967	Sri Krishnavataram		Telugu	
1967	Kanchu Kota		Telugu	
1967	Sati Sumathi		Telugu	
1967	Stree Janma		Telugu	
1967	Bhakta Prahlada		Telugu	
1967	Sri Purandara Dasaru		Kannada	
1967	Sabash Thambi	Shanthi	Tamil	
1967	Ethirigal Jakkirathai	Prabha	Tamil	
1967	Ooty Varai Uravu	Vijaya	Tamil	
1967	Bhavani		Tamil	
1967	Uyir Mel Aasai		Tamil	
1968	Kudiyirundha Koyil	Dancer	Tamil	"Aadaludan Paadalai"
1968	Anbu Vazhi		Tamil	
1969	Sipayi Chinnayya		Telugu	
1969	Noorandu Kalam Vazhga		Tamil	
1971	Sabatham	Draupadi	Tamil	Dance sequence
