= S. Rajeswara Rao =

Indian music composer (1922–1999)

Saluri Rajeswara Rao సాలూరి రాజేశ్వరరావు

Background information
- Also known as: Saluri Rajeswara Rao
- Born: 11 October 1922; Sivaramapuram, India
- Origin: Sivaramapuram, Vizianagaram district, Andhra Pradesh, India
- Died: 25 October 1999 (aged 77)
- Genre: Indian film scores
- Occupation: Composer
- Instruments: Harmonium; Tabla; Dholak; Mrudangam; Flute; Electric guitar Piano; Violin
- Years active: 1934–1986
- Award: Kalaimamani Award (1992)

Saluri Rajeswara Rao (11 October 1922 – 25 October 1999) was an Indian composer, multi-instrumentalist, singer, and music producer, known for his work in Telugu cinema. Rajeswara Rao is noted for integrating Indian classical music into Telugu cinema for over five decades. His innovative compositions and mastery of classical and folk music earned him widespread recognition.

== Early life ==
Rajeswara Rao was born in 1922 in the village of Sivaramapuram near Salur in Vizianagaram district, Andhra Pradesh. His father, Sanyasi Raju, was a mrudangam player in the troupe of the renowned violinist Dwaram Venkataswamy Naidu. Rajeswara Rao was recognized as a child prodigy and began performing on stage at the age of four. Under his father's guidance, he trained with Venkataswamy Naidu in tabla and harmonium.

== Career ==
Rajeswara Rao's career in cinema began in 1934 when recording technician Mr. Hutchins discovered him and took him to Bangalore to record the "Bhagavad Gita". He later traveled to Calcutta and was cast as Lord Krishna in the Telugu film Sri Krishna Leelalu (1935). Subsequently, he did films like Keechaka Vadha and Uttara Gograhanam and met musical legends such as Kundan Lal Saigal and Pankaj Mullick, from whom he learned Hindustani music.

Rajeswara Rao's first role as a music director came with the film Jayaprada (1939). He went on to score music for a number of successful films in multiple languages, including Telugu, Tamil, and Kannada. Some of his notable films include Malliswari (1951), Missamma (1955), and Chandralekha (1948). He was known for his use of Indian classical ragas and experimentation with foreign musical styles, including Western, Persian, and Arabic influences.

Rajeswara Rao was associated with Gemini Studios in the 1940s and composed music for many of their major films. He is credited with helping popularize light music in Telugu cinema. He was also known for his collaborations with directors like B. N. Reddy and Vijaya Productions.

== Musical style ==
Rajeswara Rao's compositions were known for their classical underpinnings, particularly his use of ragas such as "Mohanam", "Abheri", "Kalyani", and "Sindhu Bhairavi". He blended Indian classical music with other styles, creating scores that captured a wide range of emotions. His works in films like Kurukshetram (1977) and Tandra Paparayudu (1986) demonstrated his mastery over classical compositions. He was also among the first to incorporate Persian musical elements in Indian film scores.

== Personal life ==
Rajeswara Rao was married to Rajeswari Devi, with whom he had five sons and four daughters. Four of his sons, Saluri Ramalingeswara Rao, Saluri Poornachandra Rao, Saluri Vasu Rao, and Saluri Koteswara Rao (Koti), followed in his footsteps as musicians in the Telugu film industry. His elder brother, Saluri Hanumantha Rao, was also a music director in Kannada and Telugu cinema.

== Awards and honours ==
Rajeswara Rao was the recipient of numerous awards and honours for his contributions to Indian cinema, including:

- Asthana Vidwan of Tirumala Tirupati Devasthanams
- 1979: Honorary doctorate Kalaprapoorna from Andhra University.
- 1980: Nandi Award for Best Music Director for Sri Vasavi Kanyaka Parameswari Mahathmyam.
- 1992: Received title of Kalaimamani Award by the Government of Tamil Nadu, which is the highest state honour in the field of Arts
- 1992: Received Raghupathi Venkaiah Award for his outstanding contribution to Telugu cinema
- 2018: Commemorative postage stamp issued by India Post in his honour

== Filmography ==
| Year | Film | Language | Director | Notes |
|---|---|---|---|---|
| 1935 | Sri Krishna Leelalu | Telugu | Ch. Narasimha Rao | Actor |
| 1936 | Maya Bazar | Telugu | P. V. Das | Actor |
| 1939 | Jayaprada | Telugu | Ch. Narasimha Rao | Actor and Music director |
| 1940 | Illalu | Telugu | Gudavalli Ramabrahmam | Actor and Music director |
| 1940 | Jeevanmukti | Telugu | T. V. Neelakantan | |
| 1941 | Apavadu | Telugu | Gudavalli Ramabrahmam | |
| 1941 | Kamadhenu | Tamil | Nandalal Jaswantalal | with T. A. Kalyanam |
| 1941 | Madana Kama Rajan | Tamil | B. N. Rao | with M. D. Parthasarathy |
| 1942 | Bala Nagamma | Telugu | C. Pullaiah | with M. D. Parthasarathy |
| 1942 | Bhaktha Naradar | Tamil | S. Soundararajan | Background Score |
| 1942 | Nandanar | Tamil | Murugadasa | with M. D. Parthasarathy |
| 1942 | Santha Bala Nagamma | Telugu | S. V. S. Rama Rao | |
| 1943 | Chenchu Lakshmi | Telugu | S. Soundararajan | |
| 1943 | Dhaasippen | Tamil | Ellis R. Dungan | with Lalitha Venkatraman |
| 1943 | Mangamma Sabatham | Tamil | Acharya | with M. D. Parthasarathy |
| 1944 | Dasi Aparanji | Tamil | B. N. Rao | with M. D. Parthasarathy |
| 1944 | Bhishma | Telugu | Ch. Narayana Murthy | |
| 1945 | Paduka Pattabhishekam | Telugu | K. B. Nagabhushanam | |
| 1947 | Miss Malini | Tamil | Kothamangalam Subbu | with Parur S. Anantharaman |
| 1948 | Chandralekha | Hindi | S. S. Vasan | with M. D. Parthasarathy |
| 1948 | Chandralekha | Tamil | S. S. Vasan | with M. D. Parthasarathy |
| 1948 | Vindya Rani | Telugu | C. Pullayya | with Emani Sankara Sastry |
| 1949 | Apoorva Sagodharargal | Tamil | Acharya | with M. D. Parthasarathy & R. Vaidyanathan |
| 1949 | Nishaan | Hindi | Acharya | with M. D. Parthasarathy & R. Vaidyanathan |
| 1950 | Apoorva Sahodarulu | Telugu | Acharya | with M. D. Parthasarathy & R. Vaidyanathan |
| 1950 | Aahuti | Telugu | R. S. Junnarkar | |
| 1950 | Vali Sugreeva | Telugu | Jampana | Gali Penchala Narasimha Rao, Master Venu, Ghantasala & Pendyala Nageswara Rao |
| 1951 | Malliswari | Telugu | B. N. Reddy | |
| 1951 | Mantra Dandam | Telugu | K. S. Ramachandra Rao | Background Score |
| 1952 | Priyuralu | Telugu | Gopichand | with Addepalli Rama Rao |
| 1953 | Manam Pola Mangalyam | Tamil | P. Pullayya | |
| 1953 | Pempudu Koduku | Telugu | L. V. Prasad | |
| 1953 | Vayyari Bhama | Telugu | P. Subba Rao | |
| 1953 | Vazha Pirandhaval | Tamil | T. R. Ramanna | with G. Ramanathan |
| 1954 | Raju Peda | Telugu | B. A. Subba Rao | |
| 1954 | Vipra Narayana | Telugu | P. S. Ramakrishna Rao | |
| 1955 | Missamma | Telugu | L. V. Prasad | |
| 1955 | Missiamma | Tamil | L. V. Prasad | |
| 1954 | Vipra Narayana | Tamil | P. S. Ramakrishna Rao | |
| 1956 | Balasanyasamma Katha | Telugu | P. Subba Rao | |
| 1956 | Bhale Ramudu | Telugu | Vedantam Raghavayya | |
| 1956 | Prema Pasam | Tamil | Vedantam Raghavayya | |
| 1956 | Charana Daasi | Telugu | T. Prakash Rao | |
| 1956 | Mathar Kula Manickam | Tamil | T. Prakash Rao | |
| 1957 | Alladin Ka Chirag | Hindi | T. R. Raghunath | with S. Hanumantha Rao |
| 1957 | Allauddin Adhbhuta Deepam | Telugu | T. R. Raghunath | with S. Hanumantha Rao |
| 1957 | Allavudeenum Arputha Vilakkum | Tamil | T. R. Raghunath | with S. Hanumantha Rao |
| 1957 | Bhale Ammayilu | Telugu | Vedantam Raghavayya | with S. Hanumantha Rao |
| 1957 | Iru Sagodharigal | Tamil | Vedantam Raghavayya | |
| 1957 | Sati Savitri | Telugu | K. B. Nagabhushanam | M. Balamuralikrishna, Mallik, P. Suribabu, Babu Rao, J. Lakshminarayana, H. R. Padmanabha Sastry & Master Venu |
| 1957 | Sathiyavan Savithri | Tamil | K. B. Nagabhushanam | with Babu Rao |
| 1958 | Aada Pettanam | Telugu | Adurthi Subba Rao | with Master Venu |
| 1958 | Chenchu Lakshmi | Tamil | B. A. Subba Rao | |
| 1958 | Chenchu Lakshmi | Telugu | B. A. Subba Rao | |
| 1958 | Kadan Vaangi Kalyaanam | Tamil | L. V. Prasad | |
| 1958 | Paanai Pidithaval Bhaagyasaali | Tamil | T. S. Durairaj | with S. V. Venkatraman |
| 1959 | Appu Chesi Pappu Koodu | Telugu | L. V. Prasad | |
| 1959 | Aval Yaar | Tamil | K. J. Mahadevan | |
| 1959 | Illali Adrustame Intiki Bhagyamu | Telugu | T. S. Durairaj | with S. V. Venkatraman & Jeevan |
| 1960 | Nammina Bantu | Telugu | Adurthi Subba Rao | with Master Venu |
| 1960 | Pattaliyin Vetri | Tamil | Adurthi Subba Rao | with Master Venu |
| 1960 | Petra Manam | Tamil | A. Bhimsingh | |
| 1960 | Rani Ratnaprabha | Telugu | B. A. Subba Rao | |
| 1961 | Bhakta Jayadeva | Telugu | P. V. Rama Rao | |
| 1961 | Iddaru Mitrulu | Telugu | Adurthi Subba Rao | |
| 1961 | Bharya Bharthalu | Telugu | K. Pratyagatma | |
| 1962 | Aradhana | Telugu | V. Madhusudhana Rao | |
| 1962 | Vikramaadhithan | Tamil | T. R. Raghunath & N. S. Ramadas | |
| 1962 | Bhishma | Telugu | B. A. Subba Rao | |
| 1962 | Kula Gothralu | Telugu | K. Pratyagatma | |
| 1962 | Pathi Gowravame Sathikanandam | Telugu | K. J. Mahadevan | |
| 1963 | Chaduvukunna Ammayilu | Telugu | Adurthi Subba Rao | |
| 1964 | Amara Shilpi Jakkanna | Telugu | B. S. Ranga | |
| 1964 | Amarashilpi Jakanachari | Kannada | B. S. Ranga | |
| 1964 | Bobbili Yuddham | Telugu | C. Seetaram | |
| 1964 | Desa Drohulu | Telugu | Bolla Subba Rao | |
| 1964 | Doctor Chakravarti | Telugu | Adurthi Subba Rao | |
| 1964 | Mahiravana | Telugu | B. A. Subba Rao | |
| 1964 | Manchi Manishi | Telugu | K. Pratyagatma | with T. Chalapathi Rao |
| 1964 | Pooja Phalam | Telugu | B. N. Reddy | |
| 1964 | Sirpiyin Selvan | Tamil | B. S. Ranga | |
| 1965 | Aatma Gowravam | Telugu | K. Viswanath | |
| 1965 | Dorikithe Dongalu | Telugu | P. Subrahmanyam | |
| 1965 | Veera Marthanda | Telugu | T. R. Raghunath & N. S. Ramadas | |
| 1966 | Aatma Gowravam | Telugu | K. Viswanath | |
| 1966 | Bhakta Potana | Telugu | Gutha Ramineedu | |
| 1966 | Bala Nagamma | Kannada | P. R. Kaundinya | |
| 1966 | Chilaka Gorinka | Telugu | K. Pratyagatma | |
| 1966 | Mohini Bhasmasura | Telugu | B. A. Subba Rao | |
| 1966 | Palnati Yudham | Telugu | Gutha Ramineedu | |
| 1966 | Rangula Ratnam | Telugu | B. N. Reddy | with B. Gopalam |
| 1966 | Sangeeta Lakshmi | Telugu | Giduturi Suryam | |
| 1967 | Bhakta Prahlada | Tamil | Chitrapu Narayana Rao | |
| 1967 | Bhakta Prahlada | Telugu | Chitrapu Narayana Rao | |
| 1967 | Gruhalakshmi | Telugu | P. S. Ramakrishna Rao | |
| 1967 | Pula Rangadu | Telugu | Adurthi Subba Rao | |
| 1967 | Mulla Kireetam | Telugu | P. Subramanyam | with K. Devadasu |
| 1967 | Rakhta Sindhooram | Telugu | C. Seetharam | |
| 1967 | Vasantha Sena | Telugu | B. S. Ranga | |
| 1968 | Veeranjaneya | Telugu | Kamalakara Kameswara Rao | |
| 1969 | Aatmiyulu | Telugu | V. Madhusudhana Rao | |
| 1969 | Aadarsa Kutumbam | Telugu | K. Pratyagatma | |
| 1969 | Bangaru Panjaram | Telugu | B. N. Reddy | with B. Gopalam |
| 1969 | Bhale Basava | Kannada | B. S. Ranga | |
| 1969 | Dharma Patni | Telugu | B. A. Subba Rao | |
| 1969 | Mamaku Thagga Kodalu | Telugu | C. S. Rao | |
| 1970 | Chitti Chellelu | Telugu | M. Krishnan Nair | |
| 1970 | Desamante Manushuloyi | Telugu | C. S. Rao | |
| 1970 | Jai Jawan | Telugu | D. Yoganand | |
| 1971 | Amaayakuraalu | Telugu | V. Madhusudhana Rao | |
| 1971 | Bangaru Talli | Telugu | Tapi Chanakya | |
| 1971 | Pavitra Bandham | Telugu | V. Madhusudhana Rao | |
| 1971 | Ramalayam | Telugu | K. Babu Rao | with Ghantasala |
| 1971 | Sri Venkateswara Vaibhavam | Telugu | Lakshmi Films | |
| 1972 | Neeti-Nijayiti | Telugu | Singeetam Srinivasa Rao | |
| 1972 | Bala Baratham | Tamil | Kamalakara Kameswara Rao | |
| 1972 | Bala Bharatha | Kannada | Kamalakara Kameswara Rao | |
| 1972 | Bala Bharatam | Telugu | Kamalakara Kameswara Rao | |
| 1972 | Bal Mahabharat | Hindi | Kamalakara Kameswara Rao | |
| 1972 | Kalam Marindi | Telugu | K. Viswanath | |
| 1973 | Mannina Magalu | Kannada | B. S. Ranga | |
| 1973 | Neramu Siksha | Telugu | K. Viswanath | |
| 1973 | Nindu Kutumbam | Telugu | Parvataneni Sambasiva Rao | |
| 1973 | Sri Kanakadurga Mahima | Telugu | Surati Durga Rao & P. D. Prasad | with G. Aswathama |
| 1974 | Bangaaru Kalalu | Telugu | Adurthi Subba Rao | |
| 1974 | Jeevithaasayam | Telugu | Kamalakara Kameswara Rao | |
| 1974 | Jeevitha Rangamu | Telugu | Lakshmi Films | |
| 1974 | Nitya Sumangali | Telugu | B.N.R | |
| 1974 | Palle Paduchu | Telugu | K. Satyam | |
| 1974 | Ram Raheem | Telugu | B. A. Subba Rao | |
| 1974 | Tatamma Kala | Telugu | N. T. Rama Rao | |
| 1975 | Anna Thammulla Katha | Telugu | D. S. Prakash Rao | |
| 1975 | Bharathamlo Oka Ammayi | Telugu | Dasari Narayana Rao | |
| 1975 | Challani Thalli | Telugu | K. S. Rami Reddy | |
| 1975 | Yashoda Krishna | Telugu | C. S. Rao | |
| 1976 | Dasavatharam | Tamil | K. S. Gopalakrishnan | |
| 1976 | Dasavatharamulu | Telugu | K. S. Gopalakrishnan | with K. Chakravarthy |
| 1976 | Manchiki Maro Peru | Telugu | C. S. Rao | |
| 1976 | Manushulanta Okkate | Telugu | Dasari Narayana Rao | |
| 1976 | Oka Deepam Veligindhi | Telugu | Singeetham Srinivasa Rao | |
| 1977 | Eenati Bandham Yenatido | Telugu | K. S. R. Doss | |
| 1977 | Idhekkadi Nyayam | Telugu | Dasari Narayana Rao | |
| 1977 | Kurukshetram | Telugu | Kamalakara Kameswara Rao | |
| 1978 | Devadasu Malli Puttadu | Telugu | Dasari Narayana Rao | |
| 1978 | Prema Paga | Telugu | B. V. Prasad | |
| 1978 | Radhakrishna | Telugu | K. Raghavendra Rao | |
| 1978 | Sneha Sedu | Kannada | V. Madhusudhana Rao | |
| 1979 | Indrudu Chandrudu | Telugu | T. Krishna | with Saluri Babu |
| 1979 | Katha Marindi | Telugu | Madhu | |
| 1979 | Namala Thathayya | Telugu | K. Hemambharadhara Rao | |
| 1979 | Pacha Bottu | Telugu | B.N.R | |
| 1979 | Pavitra Prema | Telugu | D. S. Prakash Rao | |
| 1979 | Sri Vinayaka Vijayamu | Telugu | Kamalakara Kameswara Rao | |
| 1980 | Bapuji Bharatham | Telugu | Relangi Narasimha Rao | |
| 1980 | Bommala Koluvu | Telugu | Kommineni Seshagiri Rao | |
| 1980 | Chukkallo Chandrudu | Telugu | C. S. Rao | with K. V. Mahadevan |
| 1980 | Ondu Hennu Aaru Kannu | Kannada | V. Madhusudhana Rao | |
| 1980 | Sri Vasavi Kanyakaa Parameswari Mahathyam | Telugu | Kamalakara Kameswara Rao | |
| 1980 | Rojulu Marali | Telugu | Devadas Kanakala | |
| 1980 | Veedani Bandalu | Telugu | K. M. Reddy & V. Madhusudhana Rao | |
| 1982 | Illalu Chulallu | Telugu | | |
| 1982 | Mummidivaram Balayogeswara Charitra | Telugu | Vijayaprakash | |
| 1982 | Punnami Vennela | Telugu | P. Subramanyam | |
| 1982 | Sri Lakshmi Nilayam | Telugu | T. Krishna | with Saluri Babu |
| 1983 | Muddula Mogudu | Telugu | K. S. Prakash Rao | |
| 1984 | Adarsavanthudu | Telugu | Kodi Ramakrishna | |
| 1986 | Tandra Paparayudu | Telugu | Dasari Narayana Rao | |
| 1987 | America Abbayi | Telugu | Singeetam Srinivasa Rao | |
| 1991 | Lambadolla Ramdasu | Telugu | K. Babu Rao | |
| 1995 | Yadagiri Sri Lakshmi Narasimha Swamy Mahatyam | Telugu | A. Venugopal | with S. Vittal Rao |

== See also ==
- Raghupathi Venkaiah Award
