= Aada Pettanam =

1958 film

- Theatrical release poster
- Directed by: Adurthi Subba Rao
- Written by: Pinisetti Srirama Murthy (story / dialogues)
- Screenplay by: Adurthi Subba Rao
- Produced by: Yerra Narayana Swamy; M. Venkata Ramadasu
- Starring: Akkineni Nageswara Rao; Anjali Devi
- Cinematography: T. S. Ajith Kumar
- Edited by: M. Babu
- Music by: S. Rajeswara Rao; Master Venu
- Production company: Prabha Productions
- Release date: 6 August 1958
- Running time: 169 minutes
- Country: India
- Language: Telugu

Aada Pettanam (Telugu: ఆడపెత్తనం; transl. Women's Authority) is a 1958 Indian Telugu-language drama film, produced by M. Narayana Swamy and M. Venkata Ramadasu and directed by Adurthi Subba Rao. It stars Akkineni Nageswara Rao, Anjali Devi and music jointly composed by S. Rajeswara Rao & Master Venu. Anisetty was announced as the director initially, but Adurthi Subba Rao took over later.

== Cast ==
- Akkineni Nageswara Rao as Krishna
- Anjali Devi as Radha
- Kannamba as Rangamma
- Relangi as Lokanadham
- Gummadi as President Kondaiah
- Chadalavada as Ganapathi
- Allu Ramalingaiah as Peraiah
- Perumallu as Ramaiah
- Balakrishna as Srungaram
- Raja Sulochana as Kalavathi
- Chhaya Devi as Machamma
- Suryakala as Swarajyam

== Crew ==
- Art: Thota
- Choreography: A. K. Chopra, Venu Gopal
- Lyrics: Samudrala Sr., Sri Sri, Kosaraju, Arudra, Malladi Ramakrishna Sastry
- Playback: Ghantasala, P. Susheela, Jikki, Madhavapeddi Satyam, Pithapuram, P. Leela, Swarnalatha
- Music: S. Rajeswara Rao, Master Venu
- Story — Dialogues : Pinisetti Srirama Murthy
- Editing: M. Babu
- Cinematography: T. S. Ajith Kumar
- Producer: M. Narayana Swamy, M. Venkata Ramadasu
- Screenplay — Director: Adurthi Subba Rao
- Banner: Prabha Productions
- Release Date: 6 August 1958

== Soundtrack ==
Aada Pettanam

Film score by S. Rajeswara Rao Master Venu
- Released: 1958
- Genre: Soundtrack
- Length: 26:48
- Producers: S. Rajeswara Rao; Master Venu

Music was composed by S. Rajeswara Rao & Master Venu. Music was released on Audio Company.

S. No.	Song title	Lyrics	Singers	length
1	"Padaraa Padaraa Chal Beta"	Kosaraju	Ghantasala	3:44
2	"Priyuda Biraana"	Arudra	P. Susheela	4:00
3	"Pasidi Merugulaa"	Sri Sri	Ghantasala, P. Susheela	4:34
4	"Nee Korake Nee Korake"	Kosaraju	Ghantasala, Jikki	3:40
5	"Kaavu Kaavumanu Kakaiah"	Kosaraju	Ghantasala, P. Susheela	3:20
6	"Valape Chalu Thalape Chalu"	Samudrala Sr	P. Leela	3:05
7	"Om Namashivaya"	Malladi Ramakrishna Sastry	Pithapuram, P. Susheela	4:25
