= Laila Majnu (1962 film) =

- Directed by: P. Bhaskaran
- Written by: Jagathy N. K. Achary
- Produced by: B. N. Konda Reddy; P. Bhaskaran
- Starring: Prem Nazir; L. Vijayalakshmi
- Cinematography: D. V. Rajaram
- Edited by: Kripa Shankar
- Music by: Baburaj
- Production company: Kerala Pictures
- Release date: 9 February 1962
- Country: India
- Language: Malayalam

Laila Majnu is a 1962 Indian Malayalam-language romance film, directed by P. Bhaskaran, based on Layla and Majnun. Starring Prem Nazir and L. Vijayalakshmi, with Sathyan, Thikkurissi, T. S. Muthiah, Chandni, Adoor Bhasi and Kodungalloor Ammini Amma in supporting roles, the film's acclaimed music was composed by Baburaj. Egyptian dancer Laila appeared in one of the songs. The film was based on the classic Arabic and Persian tragic love story of Layla and Majnun.

== Cast ==
- Prem Nazir as Qais
- L. Vijayalakshmi as Laila
- Thikkurissi as Sarvari
- T. S. Muthaiah as Amir Ameeri
- Sathyan as Baqthum
- Chandni as Zareena
- Adoor Bhasi
- Master Radhakrishnan
- Sobha
- Bahadoor
- Shantha
- Baby Vilasini
- S. A. Jameel
- Kochappan
- Kodungalloor Ammini Amma

== Soundtrack ==
The music was composed by M. S. Baburaj and lyrics were written by P. Bhaskaran. Background Music was composed by M. B. Sreenivasan

No.	Song	Singers	Lyrics !
1	"Annathinum Panjamilla	KS George, Mehboob	P. Bhaskaran
2	"Chudukanneeraal"	K. P. Udayabhanu	P. Bhaskaran
3	"Kandaal Nalloru"	A. P. Komala, Chorus, Santha P. Nair	P. Bhaskaran
4	"Kanninakathoru"	K. S. George, Mehboob	P. Bhaskaran
5	"Kazhinjuvallo"	P. Leela	P. Bhaskaran
6	"Koottililam Kili"	P. Leela, A. P. Komala	P. Bhaskaran
7	"Kuppivala Nalla Chippivala"	Chorus, Gomathy, Santha P. Nair	P. Bhaskaran
8	"Oru Kulappoovirinjaal"	Santha P. Nair	P. Bhaskaran
9	"Pavanurukki"	P. Leela, K. P. Udayabhanu	P. Bhaskaran
10	"Premamadhumaasa Vanathile"	P. Leela, K. P. Udayabhanu	P. Bhaskaran
11	"Snehathin Kaananachola"	P. Leela	P. Bhaskaran
12	"Thaarame Thaarame"	P. Leela, K. P. Udayabhanu	P. Bhaskaran
13	"Thoovaala"	K. S. George, Mehboob, Santha P. Nair	P. Bhaskaran
