= Batasari =

1961 film

- Theatrical release poster
- Directed by: Ramakrishna
- Screenplay by: Samudrala Sr.
- Based on: Bardidi by Saratchandra Chatterjee
- Produced by: Ramakrishna
- Starring: P. Bhanumathi; Akkineni Nageswara Rao
- Cinematography: M. Sundaraam
- Edited by: V. Venkat
- Music by: Master Venu
- Production company: Bharani Pictures
- Release dates: 30 June 1961 (Telugu); 21 July 1961 (Tamil)
- Running time: 146 minutes
- Country: India
- Languages: Telugu; Tamil

Batasari (transl. Wayfarer) is a 1961 Indian Telugu-language drama film, produced and directed by Ramakrishna of Bharani Pictures. It was simultaneously made in Tamil as Kaanal Neer (transl. Mirage). A remake of the 1957 Bengali film Bardidi, which itself is based on the eponymous novel by Sarat Chandra Chatterjee, the film stars P. Bhanumathi and Akkineni Nageswara Rao, with music composed by Master Venu. Batasari was released on 30 June 1961, and Kaanal Neer on 21 July. Both versions did not succeed commercially.

== Cast ==
- P. Bhanumathi as Madhavi
- Akkineni Nageswara Rao as Surendranath / Suren
- J. V. Ramana Murthy as Siva Chandra
- Mudigonda Lingamurthy as Diwan Alwar
- Vangara as Pullaiah
- B. R. Panthulu as Apparao
- Vinnakota Ramanna Pantulu as Raghavaiah
- Boddapati as Anjaiah
- Doraiswamy as Zamindar of Dharapuram
- Sowcar Janaki as Shanthi
- Devika as Manorama
- Suryakantham as Sundaramma
- Chhaya Devi as Poornamma
- L. Vijayalakshmi as Dancer
- Lakshmirajyam as Dancer
- Baby Sasikala as Prameela

== Production ==
Batasari is based on the novel Bardidi by Saratchandra Chatterjee. It was simultaneously filmed in Tamil as Kaanal Neer. The Telugu version was originally titled Yendamavulu. Before and during the shoot, for inspiration, Akkineni Nageswara Rao was asked by Ramakrishna to watch Uttam Kumar's performance in the 1959 film version of Bardidi. Nageswara Rao complied, and even donned the getup just like Kumar, but held to his own on histrionics.

== Soundtrack ==
Music composed by Master Venu. Lyrics were written by Samudrala Sr. For Kaanal Neer, the lyrics were written by Kannadasan and Ku. Ma. Balasubramaniam.

Telugu Track List
Song title	Singers	Length
"O Batasari"	P. Bhanumathi	2:54
"Kanulakudoche Chetikandani"	P. Bhanumathi, Jikki	2:45
"Lokamerugani Baala"	P. Bhanumathi	3:23
"Uppakara Chinthaye"	P. Bhanumathi	3:02
"Oho Maharaja"	Jikki	3:34
"O Maata"	P. Susheela	3:16

Tamil Track List
Song	Singers	Lyrics	Length
"Ulagam Theriyaa Payire"	P. Bhanumathi	Kannadasan	03:22
"Manamenum Maaligai Meedhu"	P. B. Sreenivas, K. Jamuna Rani	Ku. Ma. Balasubramaniam	02:18
"Anbaana Enname Paavama... Kanaala Kaanaamale"	P. Bhanumathi	Ku. Ma. Balasubramaniam	03:02
"Aasai Mozhi Pesa Vaa"	P. Susheela	Kannadasan	03:09
"Kannil Therindhum Kaikku Varaadha"	P. Bhanumathi, Jikki	Kannadasan	02:35
"O Matha Jegan Matha... Arul Vizhi Paaraai Daevi"	P. Susheela	Ku. Ma. Balasubramaniam	03:00
"Vazhi Thedi Vandhaai"	P. Bhanumathi	Kannadasan	02:39
"Ammaan Magal Paaru"	Jikki	Kannadasan	03:22

== Release and reception ==
Batasari was released on 30 June 1961, and Kaanal Neer on 21 July 1961. The Indian Express said, "The standout feature of Kaanal Neer is the fascinating photography of young Venkat, particularly in the climax. In other technical respects, the film maintains a good standard." Both versions did not succeed commercially; according to historian Randor Guy, this was because audiences felt the story was too highbrow.
