= Surajit Kumar De Datta =

Indian agronomist

Surajit Kumar De Datta is an Indian agronomist who is best known for his high yield variety of rice IR8 that contributed significantly to the Green Revolution across Asia. Over the course of 27 years, he worked at the International Rice Research Institute in Philippines helping Southeast Asia get self-sufficiency in rice production. His book on rice production, Principles and Practices of Rice Production, is considered an authoritative opus in the field of rice cultivation.

He has written two books, Availability of Phosphorus and Utilization of Phosphate Fertilizers in Some Great Soil Groups of Hawaii (1963) and Availability of Phosphorus to Sugar Cane in Hawaii as Influenced by Various Phosphorus Fertilizers and Methods of Application (1965, with James C. Moomaw). For his works, he has been awarded the Norman Borlaug Award for Outstanding Contribution to Agricultural Sciences and a citation from the President of Philippines.

De Datta has received many awards over his long career. He has been named a Fellow of the American Association for the Advancement of Science, American Society of Agronomy, Soil Science Society of America, Crop Science Society of America, National Academy of Agricultural Sciences in India, and Indian Society of Soil Science.

He joined the faculty of Virginia Tech. He has published 366 journal articles, technical bulletins, and other reports in the areas of soil science, soil and crop management, and weed science. He has served on numerous boards, societies, and committees.

== Education ==
- B.S., Agriculture, Banaras Hindu University, Varanasi, India, 1956
- M.S, Soil Science and Agricultural Chemistry, Indian Agricultural Research Institute, New Delhi, India, 1958
- Ph.D., Soil Science, University of Hawaii, 1962

== Personal life ==
He married Lakshmanan Vijayalakshmi, an Indian actress who was active during the 1960s and 1970s. She was a prominent lead actress during the early 1960s in Malayalam, Tamil, Kannada, Telugu and Hindi films.

== Contribution to Green Revolution ==
The term “Green Revolution” refers to the transformation of agriculture that occurred from the 1940s through the 1960s, when farmers used the discoveries of science, planting higher-yielding rice varieties to great success. In 1968, De Datta, then an agronomist at the institute, published his findings about IR8, a variety of rice that yielded 5 tons of rice per hectare with almost no fertilizer and 9.4 tons per hectare with fertilizer. This was nearly 10 times the yield of traditional rice and came to be known as Miracle Rice.
