= Panchaali =

1959 film by Muktha Srinivasan

- Theatrical poster
- Directed by: Muktha Srinivasan
- Written by: Naga Shanmugam
- Produced by: M. A. Thyagarajan
- Starring: R. S. Manohar; Devika
- Edited by: V. Rajagopal
- Music by: K. V. Mahadevan
- Production company: M. A. V. Pictures
- Release date: 31 October 1959
- Country: India
- Language: Tamil

Panchaali is a 1959 Indian Tamil-language film directed by Muktha Srinivasan, produced by M. A. Thyagarajan, and written by Naga Shanmugam with the music composed by K. V. Mahadevan. It stars R. S. Manohar and Devika, with V. K. Ramasamy, L. Vijayalakshmi, T. P. Muthulakshmi, T. K. Ramachandran and Lakshmi Prabha in supporting roles.

== Plot ==
During the Panchayat elections held in the village Ponnaruvi, the Ayurveda specialist doctor, Dr. Natarajan defeats Anandan, the son of Kalyani Ammal. This causes Anandan and his mother, Kalyani to hate the kindhearted doctor. Apart from Anandan, Kalyani takes care of her other child, Gomathi and her nephew, Raghavan, whom she has raised as her own child.

After returning from Madras, where he had gone to study medicine, Raghavan wins over the villagers with his medical expertise and helping hand. Oblivious to Kalyani's plans to get him married to Gomathi, he falls in love with Dr. Natarajan's daughter Panchaali. The rest of the film is about Raghavan discovering Anandan's misdemeanors as a servant in disguise. Complications arise when Anandan decides to murder his enemies.

== Cast ==
- R. S. Manohar
- Devika
- V. K. Ramasamy
- L. Vijayalakshmi
- Lakshmi Prabha
- T. P. Muthulakshmi
- T. K. Ramachandran
- S. Rama Rao
- K. K. Soundar
- S. S. Srinivasan
- "Karadi" Muthu
- R. Pakkirisamy
- Chandra
- E. R. Shanthakumari
- M. S. Thamizharasi
- M. Natarajan
- Stunt P. Krishnan

== Reception ==
Randor Guy stated that the film did well at the box office, despite the predictable storyline.

== Soundtrack ==
Music by K. V. Mahadevan. The song "Oru Murai Paarthalae Podhum" is tuned in the raga Kalyani.

Songs	Singers	Lyrics	Length
"Oru Murai Paarthalae Podhum"	A. L. Raghavan	A. Maruthakasi	03:23
"Azhagu Vilayaada Amaidhi Uravaada"	A. L. Raghavan & K. Jamuna Rani	A. Maruthakasi	03:41
"Andhi Neram, Aathangarai Oram"	K. Jamuna Rani	A. Maruthakasi	
"Illaadha Pazhakkam Idhu"	K. Jamuna Rani	A. Maruthakasi	
"Maa Manakkudhu Thaen Manakkudhu"	Sirkazhi Govindarajan & Thiruchi Loganathan	A. Maruthakasi	
"Ilavu Kaatha Kili Thaano"	P. Susheela	A. Maruthakasi	
"Anbu Ullam Venum"	P. Susheela	Ku. Sa. Krishnamurthy	
"Namma Naattu Vaithiyathai"	S. C. Krishnan & Thiruchi Loganathan	Ku. Sa. Krishnamurthy	
