= Vikramaadhithan =

- Theatrical release poster
- Directed by: T. R. Raghunath; N. S. Ramadas
- Screenplay by: 'En Thangai' Natarajan
- Produced by: M. A. Ethirajulu Naidu; S. V. Namasivayam
- Starring: M. G. Ramachandran; Padmini; Sriranjini
- Cinematography: R. Sampath; V. Rajamani
- Edited by: C. P. Jambulingam; S. Murugesh
- Music by: S. Rajeswara Rao
- Production company: Jaya Bharat Productions
- Release date: 27 October 1962
- Running time: 162 minutes
- Country: India
- Language: Tamil

Vikramaadhithan is a 1962 Indian Tamil-language film directed by T. R. Raghunath and N. S. Ramadas. The film stars M. G. Ramachandran, Padmini and Sriranjini. It was in production as early as 1957, but was released on 27 October 1962.

== Plot ==
Vikramaadhithan was a king of Ujjain. He killed Nganaseedor a Munivar in order to save an innocent girl. Vikramaadhithan married Amaranaattu princess Rathinamaalai. The brothers of Nganaseedor develop enmity towards Vikramaadhithan. Vikramaadhithan killed Karthigayan and at last Paramanandam (brothers of Nganaseedor) and saved princess Muthunagai from Sivanandipuram. He saved his wife Rathinamaalai from Madurapuri king where Vikramaadhithan disguised himself and worked as commander.

== Cast ==
- M. G. Ramachandran as Vikramaadhithan
- Padmini as Princess Rathnamalai
- Sriranjini as Princess Muthunagai
- P. S. Veerappa as Madhurapuri King
- Ragini as Princess Vairamalai
- K. A. Thangavelu as Vairavan
- G. Sakunthala as Vaadaamalligai
- Rushyendramani as Queen Sathyavani
- C. K. Saraswathi as Vaadaamalligai's mother

== Production ==
One fight sequence was filmed over three days at Vauhini Studios.

== Soundtrack ==
The music was composed by S. Rajeswara Rao. Lyrics were by Pattukkottai Kalyanasundaram, Kannadasan, A. Maruthakasi, M. K. Athmanathan, Puratchidasan, 'En Thangai' Natarajan, Saravanabhavanandhar, Clown Sundaram & A. Lakshmanadas.

Song	Singers	Lyrics	Length
"Adhisayam Ivanadhu"	M. L. Vasanthakumari	A. Lakshmanadas	02:46
"Vannam Paadudhe"	T. M. Soundararajan & P. Susheela	A. Maruthakasi	03:27
"Nilaiyaana Kalai Vaazghave"	P. Leela & T. V. Rathnam	Saravanabhavanandhar	05:05
"Venmugile Konja Neram Nillu"	P. Susheela	M. K. Athmanathan	04:26
"Theermaanam Sariyaaga Aaadaavittaal"	T. M. Soundararajan	En Thangai Natarajan	04:03
"Mugatthai Paarthu Muraikkaatheenga"	P. Leela & T. M. Soundararajan	Pattukkottai Kalyanasundaram	03:50
"Sokkum Mozhiyaale"	Jikki & Group	Puratchidasan	
"Kannip Pennin Roja"	P. Susheela	Kannadasan	02:56
"Mangili Rangammaa"	Sirkazhi Govindarajan, Jikki & Group	Clown Sundaram	
"Anbin Uruvam Neeye"	P. Susheela		03:13
