= IR8 =

Variety of grasses

IR8 is a high-yielding semi-dwarf rice variety developed by the International Rice Research Institute (IRRI) in the early 1960s. It was developed by an IRRI team directed by Dr. Peter Jennings with members Dr. Sterling Wortman, Dr. Rudolfo Aquino, Dr. Henry Beachell, Dr. Akira Tanaka, Dr. Te-Tzu Chang, Dr. Surajit Kumar De Datta, and Dr. Robert F. Chandler.

== Research ==
IR8 was the eighth of 38 crossbred rice varieties in a 1962 experiment by IRRI. It was a cross of Peta, a high yield rice variety from Indonesia, and Dee-geo-woo-gen (DGWG), a dwarf variety from Taiwan. The semidwarf-1 gene (sd-1 or Os01g0883800), which encodes an enzyme in the production of the hormone gibberellin, which affects plant height; this improved its yield. IR8 was well suited to the places it was first introduced. However, it “did not fit most rice-growing situations,” which involve heavy monsoons or deep flooding.

== Cultivation ==
In November 1966, IR8 was introduced in the Philippines and India. Promoters such as the IRRI and farmer benefactors of IR8 have called it 'miracle rice', and celebrate it for fighting famine. IR8 dramatically increased the yields of Asian rice from 1 or 2 ton per hectare to 4 or 5 tons per hectare. It played a significant part in the Green Revolution.
