= Raju Peda =

- Theatrical release poster
- Directed by: B. A. Subba Rao
- Written by: Pinisetty Srirama Murty (dialogues)
- Based on: The Prince and the Pauper by Mark Twain
- Produced by: B. A. Subba Rao
- Starring: N. T. Rama Rao; Lakshmirajyam; S. V. Ranga Rao; Master Sudhakar
- Cinematography: Aadi-Erani
- Edited by: K. A. Marthand
- Music by: S. Rajeswara Rao
- Production company: B.A.S. Productions
- Release date: 25 June 1954
- Country: India
- Language: Telugu

Raju Peda (transl. The prince and the pauper) is a 1954 Indian Telugu-language film directed and produced by B. A. Subba Rao. The film stars N. T. Rama Rao, Lakshmirajyam, S. V. Ranga Rao and Master Sudhakar, with music composed by S. Rajeswara Rao. It is based on Mark Twain’s 1881 novel, The Prince and the Pauper and was later remade into the Hindi film Raja Aur Runk (1968) and dubbed into Tamil as Aandi Petra Selvan (1957).

== Plot ==
The film opens in a kingdom where two boys, Narendra Dev and Narisigadu, are born as doppelgangers. Narendra Dev is the heir to Emperor Surendra Dev, while Narisigadu is born to the impoverished Poligadu, a beggar and thief. Twelve years later, Emperor Surendra Dev falls gravely ill and transfers royal authority to his son, aware that his brother-in-law, Vikram, is scheming to seize the throne. Meanwhile, Narisigadu lives with his mother, Achamma, and sister, Malli, in dire poverty. Poligadu forces Narisigadu to beg and prevents him from attending school, prompting Narisigadu to run away.

One day, while wandering near the palace, Narisigadu meets Narendra, who invites him inside. Narendra, aware of their identical appearance, hides the royal assent and suggests they temporarily swap places. Mistaken for Narisigadu, Narendra is expelled from the palace, while Narisigadu is assumed to be the prince. As Narendra experiences the hardships of common life, Narisigadu's strange behavior in the palace is attributed to memory loss. Emperor Surendra Dev repeatedly asks for the royal assent, but Narisigadu, unaware of its location, is unable to produce it.

Narendra eventually ends up at Narisigadu's home, where he faces mistreatment from Poligadu. He escapes and meets Sudhir, a noble soldier who is in love with Malli. Though initially skeptical of Narendra's claims of royalty, Sudhir agrees to help him.

After Emperor Surendra Dev passes away, the prince's charge is given to the loyal Vijaya Varma. Meanwhile, Poligadu and his gang plot to rob the royal treasury, with Narendra joining them in order to gain access to the court. Narendra confronts Narisigadu, accusing him of usurping his position, but Narisigadu humbly admits the truth. Overhearing this, Vikram plans to assassinate the prince, using his ally, Subedar, to carry out the scheme. Subedar captures Narendra, but Poligadu and Sudhir intervene, thwarting the plot.

Just before the coronation, Poligadu and Sudhir arrive with Narendra, shocking the court with the identical appearances of the two boys. Vikram tries to discredit Narendra, but he correctly answers the nobles' questions and reveals the location of the missing royal assent. Vikram attempts to kill Narendra, but Narisigadu defends him, and Poligadu ultimately stops Vikram.

The film concludes with Narendra being crowned king and Narisigadu being rewarded with an honorable rank, restoring his family's dignity.

== Cast ==
- N. T. Rama Rao as Poligadu
- Lakshmirajyam as Achamma
- S. V. Ranga Rao as Maharaju Surendra Dev
- Relangi as Sudhir
- R. Nageswara Rao as Vikram
- Dr. Sivaramakrishnayya as Bhugolam Panthulu
- V. C. Kamaraju as Vijay
- Lakshmaiah Chowdary as Subedhar
- Chelamaiah Chowdary as Raja Guruvu
- Jaya Rami Reddy as Bhaskar
- Lakshman Rao as Prabhakar
- Ammaji as Malli
- T. D. Kusalakumari as dancer
- Master Sudhakar as Narendra Dev & Naarigadu (dual role)

== Soundtrack ==
=== Telugu ===
The music of the film was composed by S. Rajeswara Rao. Lyrics were by Tapi Dharma Rao, Aatreya and Kosaraju. Playback singers are Ghantasala, Madhavapeddi Satyam, Jikki, K. Rani, P. Susheela and T. Sathyavathi.

No.	Song	Singer(s)	Lyricist	Duration (mm:ss)
1	"Amma Amma Enta Haayiga Pilichade"	Jikki	Tapi Dharma Rao	02:38
2	"Yuvarajuvule... Chinni Nanna Challagundali"	Jikki & T. Sathyavathi	Aatreya	04:51
3	"Ghoramuraa Vidhi.... Veduka Kosam"	Ghantasala	Tapi Dharma Rao	03:11
4	"Jay Jay.... Jebulo Bomma"	Ghantasala	Kosaraju	02:55
5	"Kallu Terachi Kanara Satyam"	Jikki	Kosaraju	02:13
6	"Marindi Marindi Mana Rajakeeyame Marindi"	K. Rani	Kosaraju	02:04
7	"Nariga Nayana Enta Vedakina Kanaranida"	Jikki & P. Susheela	Kosaraju	02:37
8	"Srimantulu Dheemantulu Indarunnare"	Jikki	Tapi Dharma Rao	02:31
9	"Malli Pilli Banginapalli Malli Rave"		Tapi Dharma Rao	
10	"Jambhaari Pratimaana Vaibhava (Padyam)"	Madhavapeddi Satyam	Tapi Dharma Rao	

=== Tamil ===
Music for the Tamil version was composed by T. Chalapathi Rao and the lyrics were penned by Kuyilan and Puratchidasan. Playback singers are T. M. Soundararajan, S. C. Krishnan, Jikki, P. Leela, R. Balasaraswathi Devi, M. S. Rajeswari, T. Sathyavathi and Kamala.

No.	Song	Singer/s	Lyricist	Duration (m:ss)
1	"Ammaa Ammaa"	R. Balasaraswathi Devi	Puratchidasan	02:42
2	"Jaya Veerarilum Miga Theerane"	Jikki & T. Sathyavathi	Puratchidasan	04:51
3	"Aandi Petra.... Vindhai Endre"	T. M. Soundararajan	Kuyilan	03:03
4	"Jay Jay.... Jeppilor Bommai"	S. C. Krishnan	Kuyilan	02:55
5	"Kannai Thirandhu Kaanadaa"	Jikki	Kuyilan	03:06
6	"Vaarungal Vaarungal"	P. Leela	Puratchidasan	02:04
7	"Kannanai Kaanane Kaanane"	Jikki & T. Sathyavathi	Puratchidasan	02:37
8	"Seemaangalum Komaangalum"	Jikki	Kuyilan	02:53

== Awards ==
- This film was one of N. T. Rama Rao's finest performances, for which he was presented the Rashtrapati Award.
