= Murali Krishna (film) =

- Theatrical release poster
- Directed by: P. Pullaiah
- Written by: Acharya Aatreya (dialogues)
- Screenplay by: P. Pullaiah
- Story by: P. Radha
- Produced by: V. Venkateswarlu
- Starring: Akkineni Nageswara Rao; Jamuna
- Cinematography: Madhav Bulbule
- Edited by: R. Hanumantha Rao
- Music by: Master Venu
- Production company: Padmasri Pictures
- Release date: 14 February 1964
- Running time: 162 minutes
- Country: India
- Language: Telugu

Murali Krishna is a 1964 Telugu-language drama film, produced by V. Venkateswarlu under the Padmasri Pictures banner and directed by P. Pullaiah. It stars Akkineni Nageswara Rao, Jamuna and features music composed by Master Venu.

== Plot ==
The film begins with an ideal Dr. Krishna, who falls for naughty Murali, retired army chief Bhayamkar's daughter, and the two married. Murali maintains intimate contact via letters as an admiration with artist Kantam misreading him for female. Later, he declares himself as Lakshmikanth and proposes to her. So, Murali's bestie, Srilatha, insists on her wrapping up. But, She poses Srilatha as Murali to conduct her wedlock with Kantam. The act turns pathetic since destiny makes Krishna & Kantham mates, who get knowledge of his love story and get wrong the amour is his wife. Thus, he affirms to unite them, so he quietly serves divorce and quits. Being conscious of it, Murali collapses and learns the reason behind the calamity through Kantam. Nevertheless, she divulges the actuality and pleads him to knit Srilatha, which they do. Next, Murali sets foot at her Bhayankar's residence, where she faces his bereavement. Additionally, she loses her father too.

Krishna establishes a hospital in a remote village, where he is equated to deity by the public for his amiable nature. Once, he revives Zamindar Raghuramayya from the death bed when his widowed daughter, Poornima, starts adoring him. Fortunately, Murali lands as a nurse at the nearby town hospital. Murali & Poornima get acquainted and become good mates, and she comprehends Poornima's feelings. Hence, unbeknownst, Murali sets on to convey with Krishna, convincing Raghuramayya, and gets bewildered, spotting him. Yet, she stands firm and opts to conjoin them. Ergo, Murali walks out by endorsing a letter. Tragically, she has an accident while exiting the village. However, Krishna detects her handwriting and rushes up. Eventually, Kantham & Srilatha arrive therein and unveil the totality. Gravely injured, Murali is carried to Krishna's hospital when dismayed Krishna is incapable of the surgery. At last, Poornima boosts his courage and shields his better half with idolization. Finally, the movie ends happily with the couple's reunion.

== Cast ==
- Akkineni Nageswara Rao as Dr. Krishna
- Jamuna as Murali
- S. V. Ranga Rao as Col. Bhayankar
- Gummadi as Raghuramayya
- Haranath as Lakshmikantham
- Ramana Reddy as Vaikuntanatha Varma
- Allu Ramalingaiah as Koti
- Peketi Sivaram as Lakshmikantham's Friend
- Suryakantham as Lavanyam
- Sharada as Srilatha
- Geetanjali as Poornima
- L. Vijayalakshmi as Dancer
- Jhansi as Parvatham

== Soundtrack ==
Murali Krishna

Film score by Master Venu
- Released: 1964
- Genre: Soundtrack
- Length: 26:47
- Producer: Master Venu

Music was composed by Master Venu. The song "Nee Sukhame Ne Koruthunna" was a chartbuster.

S. No.	Song title	Lyrics	Singers	length
1	"Kanulu Kanulu Kalisenu"	C. Narayana Reddy	Ghantasala	3;12
2	"Oo Anu Oo Oo Anu"	C. Narayana Reddy	Ghantasala, P. Susheela	3:36
3	"Nee Sukhame Ne Koruthunna"	Acharya Aatreya	Ghantasala	4:01
4	"Ghalu Ghallani"	Dasaradhi	Jamuna Rani	4:25
5	"Mogunaa Ee Veena"	Acharya Aatreya	S. Janaki	4:23
6	"Vasthaadammaa Nee Daivamu"	Acharya Aatreya	P. Susheela	3:13
7	"Yemani Yemani"	Acharya Aatreya	P. Susheela	3:57
