= Ooty Varai Uravu =

1967 film by C. V. Sridhar

- Theatrical release poster
- Directed by: Sridhar
- Written by: Sridhar
- Produced by: Kovai Chezhiyan
- Starring: Sivaji Ganesan; K. R. Vijaya
- Cinematography: N. Balakrishnan
- Edited by: N. M. Sankar
- Music by: M. S. Viswanathan
- Production company: Kay Cee Films
- Release date: 1 November 1967
- Running time: 157 minutes
- Country: India
- Language: Tamil

Ooty Varai Uravu (transl. A relationship till Ooty) is a 1967 Indian Tamil-language romantic comedy film written and directed by Sridhar. The film stars Sivaji Ganesan and K. R. Vijaya, with T. S. Balaiah, Muthuraman, V. K. Ramasamy, Nagesh, L. Vijayalakshmi, Sachu and Sundari Bai in supporting roles. It was Vijayalakshmi's last film before her marriage. The film was released on 1 November 1967 and became a box office success, running for over 100 days in theatres. It was remade in Hindi as Aankh Micholi (1972) and in Telugu as Sri Ranga Neethulu (1983).

== Plot ==
Vedachalam, a wealthy businessman from Ooty, is married to Sundari and has a son, Ravi who is now taking care of the family business. Vedachalam is also secretly married to Sivakami and has a daughter Vijaya, by the second marriage. After Sivakami's death, his daughter decides to seek him out and sets out to Ooty to confront him with proofs of his second marriage.

Meanwhile, another Vijaya with the same name is the daughter of a wealthy zamindar. After her parents death, her uncle tries to marry her in order to acquire her wealth. Unwilling to marry him, she runs away from home. On the way to the railway station, her taxi runs over the first Vijaya. She tries to take her to the hospital, but the taxi driver refuses to help. Ravi who comes on the same road sees Vijaya and hospitalises her.

The second Vijaya reaches the railway station and realises that she has the first Vijaya's luggage. She opens the trunk and finds evidence of Vedachalam and Sivakami's wedding. Needing a place to stay, she decides to go to Vedachalam and claim that she is his daughter. She meets Ravi on the train and she pretends to be Vedachalam's daughter. Ravi is disturbed to know that his father had a second wife, but does not reveal his identity to her.

The second Vijaya meets Vedachalam and confronts him. He accepts the charges and introduces her to his wife and son as his friend's daughter. Vijaya also agrees to pretend to be his friend's daughter. Ravi initially accepts her claim, but later realises that she is not his real sister because his sister is left-handed while Vijaya is right-handed. She is forced to tell him the truth.

Initially, Ravi decides to throw her out but later tells her to continue acting as his sister in order to make his father admit to his deceipt and accept his real sister. Meanwhile, he falls in love with her and his mother accepts their relationship and want to get them married. Vedachalam is against this relationship since he believes that Vijaya is his daughter.

Having lost the proof of her birth, the now-recovered first Vijaya meets her boyfriend, Sundaram and seeks his help. Since his father is against love marriages, Sundaram puts her up temporarily in a hotel.

Tirupathy is Vedachalam's family physician and he sees a "Missing" advertisement placed by Vijaya's uncle and tries to find out who she is. Meanwhile, Ravi meets his real sister in the hotel with Sundaram. Being Sundaram's friend, he tries to help the couple without revealing his relationship with Vijaya. At his suggestion, Sundaram takes Vijaya home claiming that he ran over her and that she has lost her memory as a result of the accident.

Sundaram calls in Ravi who pretends to be a doctor and they convince Sundaram's father that if he does not help treat Vijaya, Sundaram will be jailed for the accident. So she stays in the house, and they give her a new name, Rathi. Since Ravi has to return to Ooty, Sundaram, his father and Rathi move there as well. There Ravi tells Sundaram's father that she is Vedachalam's daughter. He also advises him to get his son married to Vijaya on the quiet since her father is much wealthier than him and may not agree to the marriage. Vijaya wants Ravi to attend the wedding but he says that he is having a registered marriage with Vijaya on that day.

Being anxious to get his son married to the wealthy Vijaya as soon as possible, Sundaram's father promises to conduct both weddings together at his expense. Meanwhile, there is a little bust up as Thirupathy's wife informs Vijaya's uncle about her whereabouts and he kidnaps her on the wedding day. However, Thirupathy, Ravi and Sundaram rescue her and return to the wedding venue.

Vedachalam who comes there to attend Sundaram's wedding is shocked to see that Ravi is getting married there as well. Pushed to a corner, Vedachalam is forced to confess that he had a daughter by a second marriage and that Vijaya is this daughter. Ravi then steps forward and explains that she is not the daughter but Vijaya is. Sundari forgives Vedachalam, accepts Vijaya and both marriages take place.

== Cast ==
Male cast

- Sivaji Ganesan as Ravi
- T. S. Balaiah as Vedhachalam
- Muthuraman as Sundaram
- V. K. Ramasamy as Nallasivam
- Nagesh as Dr. Thirupathy
- Senthamarai as Veerasamy

Female cast

- K. R. Vijaya as Vijaya
- L. Vijayalakshmi as Vijaya/Rathi/Bharathi
- Sachu as Alamel
- Sundari Bai as Sundari

== Production ==
After acting in a few sentimental films directed by Sridhar, Ganesan asked him to prepare a lighter script for their next collaboration, which became Ooty Varai Uravu. Kovai Chezhiyan agreed to produce as he wanted to make a film similar to Sridhar's Kadhalikka Neramillai (1964); he also insisted Sridhar to retain cast from that film and also shoot it in Ooty. Sridhar and Gopu discussed the script at Gandhi Statue near Marina Beach and completed within two hours.

The film was initially titled Vayasu 16 Jakkiradhai, then Vayasu 18 Jakkiradhai before settling on Ooty Varai Uravu. The trope from Kadhalikka Neramillai of a man assuming a fake identity to help his friend win his love was reused here. It was Vijaylakshmi's last film before her marriage. Muthuraman, Nagesh, T. S. Balaiah and Sachu, who were part of Kadhalikka Neramillai, were retained for this film.

Initially cast in this film, under the title "Kaalamellam Kaathiruppen" ("I Will Wait Forever"), Actress Jayalalithaa reportedly withdrew after four days of shooting, either after the casting came to the attention of MGR, and also due to call-sheet issues of Jayalalithaa with director Sridhar and was subsequently replaced by K. R. Vijaya. Lyricist Kannadasan is said to have alluded to the episode through the line, "Pudhu naadagatthil oru naayagi sila naal mattum nadikka vandhaal" ("In a new drama, a heroine came to act only for a few days"), and later referenced her reunion with Sivaji Ganesan as his co-star in Galatta Kalyanam through the lyric, "Nalla idam nee vandha idam varavendum kaadhal mahaaraani".("The place you have come to is a noble one; come, O queen of love").

== Soundtrack ==
The music was composed by M. S. Viswanathan, with lyrics by Kannadasan. The song "Poo Maalaiyil" is set in Abheri raga.

Track	Singers	Duration
"Thedinen Vanthathu"	P. Susheela	05:05
"Raja Raja Sri"	P. B. Sreenivas, L. R. Eswari	04:19
"Pudhu Nadagathil"	T. M. Soundararajan	03:19
"Poo Malaiyil"	T. M. Soundararajan, P. Susheela	04:10
"Ange Maalimayakkam"	T. M. Soundararajan, P. Susheela	03:42
"Happy Indru Mudhal"	T. M. Soundararajan, P. Susheela	03:26
"Yaarodum Pesakkoodathu"	P. B. Sreenivas, L. R. Eswari	03:16

== Release and reception ==
Ooty Varai Uravu was released on 1 November 1967, Diwali day. Despite facing competition from another Sivaji Ganesan film Iru Malargal, released on the same day, it emerged a commercial success, running for over 100 days in theatres. Kalki said the film, despite its lack of originality, was worth watching for its humour. Malathi Rangarajan of The Hindu noted, "The greatness of [Chitralaya] Gopu's scripts lies in the fact that even with a massive cast, he provided ample scope for every role", citing Ooty Varai Uravu as an example.

== Remakes ==
Ooty Varai Uravu was remade in Telugu as Sri Ranga Neethulu (1983). T. R. Ramanna's relative E. V. Rajan asked Sridhar for the rights to remake the film in Hindi, and Sridhar sold them for ₹50,000 (equivalent to ₹2.7 million or US$28,000 in 2023). However, Kovai Chezhiyan sent a legal notice to Sridhar, arguing that unless discussed and mutually agreed upon, the remake rights belong only to the producer, and Sridhar was in the wrong since they both had no such discussion. A court case was held, where Chezhiyan was represented by V. P. Raman and Sridhar by N. C. Raghavachari. The case was closed in Sridhar's favour.
