= Muddula Mogudu =

Muddula Mogudu may refer to:

- Muddula Mogudu (1983 film)
- Muddula Mogudu (1997 film)
