= Aval Yaar =

1959 film

- Poster
- Directed by: K. J. Mahadevan
- Screenplay by: Vidwan Ve.Lakshmanan
- Story by: Devipriya
- Produced by: K. J. Mahadevan
- Starring: Sivaji Ganesan; Pandari Bai; S. V. Ranga Rao; Sowcar Janaki
- Cinematography: V. Ramamoorthy
- Music by: S. Rajeswara Rao
- Production company: Sudarsanam Pictures
- Release date: 30 October 1959
- Country: India
- Language: Tamil

Aval Yaar (transl. Who is she?) is a 1959 Indian Tamil-language legal thriller film, directed by K. J. Mahadevan. The film stars Sivaji Ganesan, Pandari Bai, S. V. Ranga Rao and Sowcar Janaki. It was released on 30 October 1959, The film was shot at Golden Cine Studios with V. Ramamurthi handling the camera. Despite excellent performances by the cast, the film did not do well.

== Plot ==
Mahalakshmi, the daughter of a wealthy banker named Sahasranamam, finds her life upended when her father's wishes for her to marry a young man named Gopi are derailed. Sadhasivam, a prominent local lawyer who is a widower, wishes to marry her. She marries him to safeguard her father's reputation. Her father dies soon after their wedding. The couple have a son. The lawyer's nephew Bhoopathi, not worldly-wise, has a friend called Bahadur, who wishes to exploit him for his money. Bhoopathi has a sweetheart called Asha. The lawyer hands over his safe's keys to Mahalakshmi, which upsets Bahadur. He drives a wedge between the lawyer and his wife. Suspecting his wife, the lawyer turns her out of the house. The innocent woman without her husband's knowledge takes the child away. She loses the child, who is brought up by a rich couple, Manivel and Maragatham. This upsets Mahalakshmi, who loses her mental balance.

Years pass and Mahalakshmi, completely cured, takes care of a young girl, Vijaya, under a new name, Ponni. Her son goes to England to become a barrister, about which his mother has no knowledge. Bahadur creates fake letters as if written by Mahalakshmi and threatens to publish them in his third-rate "yellow" magazine unless she pays a huge price. When she goes to meet Bahadur to persuade him to hand over the letters, he is found murdered. She is arrested and charged with murder. By now Sadhasivam has become a judge and the case comes up for trial before him. How the truth comes out and happiness is restored forms the rest of the plot.

== Cast ==
Male cast

- Sivaji Ganesan as Sadhasivam
- Ramanachalam as Kannan
- S. V. Ranga Rao as Manivel
- S. V. Sahasranamam as Banker Sahasranamam
- T. R. Ramachandran as Boopathy
- T. K. Ramachandran as Bahadur
- G. Pattu Iyer as Doctor
- V. Gopalakrishnan as Ragupathy
- Parthiban as Ravichandran
- G. V. Sharma as Sundaramoorthy

Female cast

- Pandari Bai as Mahalakshmi
- Sowcar Janaki as Vijaya
- Malini as Asha
- Sandhya as Maragatham
- K. R. Chellam as Ponnamma
- Baby Malathi as Baby Vijaya
- Karaikudi Lakshmi as Vijaya's Mother

Support cast

- Ganapathy Bhat, Sami Velayutham, Sampath,
  V. K. Achari, and Haniff Kumar.

== Production ==
V. Gopalakrishnan who acted in this film revealed that Ganesan worked in this film "hardly 4 to 6 days".

== Soundtrack ==
The music was composed by S. Rajeswara Rao. One song "Kannan Pirandhaan" by Subramania Bharati also was included in the film.

Song	Singer/s	Lyricist	Duration
"Kan Kaanum Minnal Thaano"	Raghunath Panigrahi	Vidwan Lakshmanan	03:12
"Naan Thedum Podhu Nee Odalaamo"	Raghunath Panigrahi	Vidwan Lakshmanan	03:11
"Pattu Poochchi Polum Raani"	A. M. Rajah & Jikki	Vidwan Lakshmanan	02:58
"Adakkiduven"	S. C. Krishnan & T. V. Rathnam	Pattukkottai Kalyanasundaram	03:17
"Sugam Varuvadhu"	Jikki & group	Pattukkottai Kalyanasundaram	
"Pudhu Azhagai Rasikka Varum"	P. B. Srinivas, Jikki & Group	Pattukkottai Kalyanasundaram	03:59
"Enna Aanandam"	P. Leela	Papanasam Sivan	02:46
"Kanne En Kanmaniye"	P. Leela	Papanasam Sivan	03:13
"Kannukkazhagaa Pengalai"	Jikki, T. V. Rathnam & group	V. Seetharama	03:16
"Vaaraaru Vaaraaru Vanthukitte"	V. N. Sundaram & group	V. Seetharama	05:13
"Kannan Pirandhaan Engal"	Kumari Abhayam	Subramania Bharati	

== Reception ==
Ananda Vikatan said that though the story was confusing, the film was technically good. Kanthan of Kalki appreciated the director for trying to take Tamil cinema in a new direction, even if he was not successful in achieving that goal. Facing competition from another Sivaji Ganesan starrer Bhaaga Pirivinai, it did not do well at the box-office.
