= Jayaprada (film) =

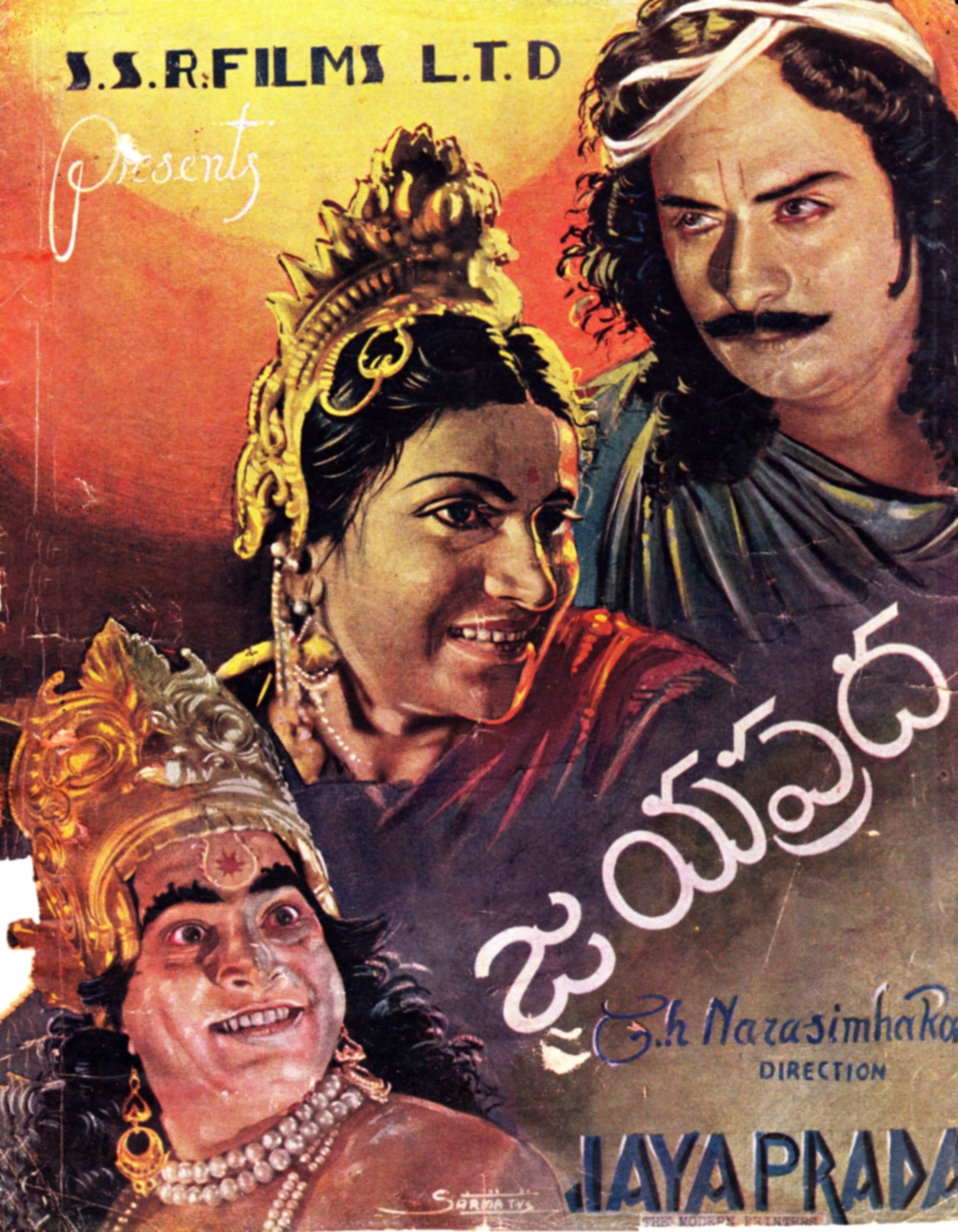
- Jayaprada Movie poster
- Directed by: Ch. Narasimha Rao
- Written by: taken from Mahabharata
- Produced by: Dadireddy Nagireddy, Dadireddy Dastagiri Reddy
- Starring: C. S. R. Anjaneyulu; K. Pichchayya; Suryakumari; Chitti; Ballari Lalita; Narasimha Rao
- Cinematography: D.T. Tellang
- Edited by: Ch. Narasimha Rao
- Music by: S. Rajeswara Rao
- Distributed by: Sree Sarada Rayalaseema films limited
- Release date: 1939
- Running time: 190 Minutes
- Country: India
- Language: Telugu

Jayaprada is a 1939 Telugu-language historical drama film directed by Ch. Narasimha Rao. This film was also released with the title Puroorava chakravarti. This is the first movie for which S. Rajeswara Rao gave a full music score as a composer. C. S. R. Anjaneyulu played the role of Puroorava in this film.

== Plot ==
Pururava was one of the six mightiest emperors of ancient India. When an army attacks his fort, unwilling to have a bloodshed because of a possible fight, Pururava escapes with his wife and two kids to a forest close by. From there the king and the queen are employed at a prosperous person by name Narayana Sait. The rest of the story moves around how Sani, the planet that troubles people creates perils for Pururava and his wife and how they win over them. The story ends showing Pururava in his pomp and glory, surmounting all his difficulties.

== Cast ==
Actor	Character
C.S.R. Anjaneyulu	Pururava
Actress	Character
Surya Kumari	Heroine
Producer
Dadireddy Dastagiri Reddy, Dadireddy Nagireddy

== Sound track ==
1. Aiswaryamuletlu Poyinanugaanee
2. Athadaanyaayapu Chakravarthi
3. Bhagavathee Naluvasathee Kaavavae Jananee
4. Bheekaraaranya Seemala Veduka
5. Erugavugaani Kaalagati
6. Etula Sahinchedavo Nae Jananeejanakula
7. Haanaatha Haa Kaantha Yanuchu
8. Janapatikae Tagunaa Yee Kooleeyuni Bratuku
9. Maargamadaedo Ganchudee Daehanu Nithyamoo Kaadidee Vinudee
10. Maayaavilaasamae Kaadaa Jagathee
11. Manoharamee Vanaamthaseemaa Mudaavahambagugaa
12. Manujaaliki Nee Dharani Padhaanaa Kalpabhooruhame
13. Marathumaninaa Marapuraavo
14. Naenu Narasathee Maryaada
15. Nanu Bigiyaara Kougita

and 9 other songs
