= Adarsavanthudu =

- Directed by: Kodi Ramakrishna
- Written by: Acharya Aatreya (dialogues)
- Screenplay by: Kodi Ramakrishna
- Story by: Kodi Ramakrishna
- Produced by: Ch. Prakash Rao
- Starring: Akkineni Nageswara Rao; Radha
- Cinematography: S. Navakanth
- Edited by: Veemuri Ravi
- Music by: S. Rajeswara Rao
- Production company: Maheejaa Films
- Release date: 30 July 1984
- Running time: 126 mins
- Country: India
- Language: Telugu

Adarsavanthudu (transl. Ideal Person) is a 1984 Telugu-language drama film, produced by Ch. Prakash Rao under the Maheejaa Films banner and directed by Kodi Ramakrishna. It stars Akkineni Nageswara Rao and Radha, with music composed by S. Rajeswara Rao.

== Plot ==
Sridhar is an advocate, the son of a tycoon, and retired Chief Justice Raja Shekaram. Sridhar always enjoys life in the field and returns after completing his LLB. On the way, he gets acquainted with a girl named Lakshmi, who abuses his arrogance, but he likes her attitude. After reaching home, Sridhar takes up his first case and proves an innocent girl as a prostitute. Due to this, the girl commits suicide, suffering Sridhar out of remorse. At that moment, his driver, Chiranjeevi, consoles him and makes him understand the difference between justice & injustice. From there, Sridhar decides to stand for righteousness. Meanwhile, Sridhar's maternal uncle, Dattudu, tyrants his village, mingling with his associate Lingaiah, bringing a false case where Sridhar supports the truth and punishes the accusations. Keeping this grudge in mind, Dattudu tries to kill Sridhar when Chiranjeevi sacrifices his life to save him. Before dying, he entrusts his family responsibilities to Sridhar. Sridhar must differ from his father and leave the house in this issue. After that, Sridhar reaches Chiranjeevi's village, headed by Lingaiah, and meets his parents, Raghavaiah & Janakamma, where he is surprised to see Lakshmi as their daughter. At present, Sridhar merges with them, but Lakshmi has doubts, so she digs out the truth and blames him for the cause. On the other side, Lingaiah has an evil eye on Lakshmi and threatens Raghavaiah to make his marriage with her for his debt, which leads to his death. Even though Lingaiah's enormities increase daily, he occupies entire villagers' fields and does not allow them to farm. Sridhar aids them when Lakshmi understands his virtue, and both fall in love. Parallelly, Dattudu witnesses Sridhar, mistakes him for an identical person, and plagues Lingaiah to replace him as Sridhar to grab his property. Knowing their malice, Sridhar agrees, and with a play, he ceases them. Finally, the movie ends on a happy note with the marriage of Sridhar & Lakshmi.

== Cast ==
- Akkineni Nageswara Rao as Sridhar
- Radha as Lakshmi
- Jaggayya as Justice Raja Shekharam
- Kanta Rao as Raghavaiah
- Ramakrishna as Chiranjeevi
- Gollapudi Maruthi Rao as Dattudu
- Nutan Prasad as Lingaiah
- Anjali Devi as Janakamma
- Athili Lakshmi as Annapurna
- Shyamala Gowri as Kavitha

== Crew ==
- Art: Bhaskar Raju
- Choreography: Siva Subramanyam, Tarun
- Lyrics — Dialogues: Acharya Aatreya
- Playback: S. P. Balasubrahmanyam, P. Susheela, Madhavapeddi Ramesh
- Music: S. Rajeswara Rao
- Editing: Veemuri Ravi
- Cinematography: S. Navakanth
- Producer: Ch. Prakash Rao
- Story — Screenplay — Director: Kodi Ramakrishna
- Banner: Maheejaa Films
- Release Date: 30 July 1984

== Soundtrack ==
Adarsavanthudu

Film score by S. Rajeswara Rao
- Released: 1984
- Genre: Soundtrack
- Length: 20:02
- Producer: S. Rajeswara Rao

Music composed by S. Rajeswara Rao. Lyrics were written by Acharya Aatreya.

S. No.	Song title	Singers	length
1	"Jeevathamante"	S. P. Balasubrahmanyam	3:21
2	"Neeli Neeli Ningilo"	S. P. Balasubrahmanyam, P. Susheela	3:42
3	"Peedaleni Roju"	S. P. Balasubrahmanyam, Madhavapeddi Ramesh	3:55
4	"Emito Aavuthandi"	S. P. Balasubrahmanyam, P. Susheela	4:17
5	"Puttiperigedi"	S. P. Balasubrahmanyam	4:07
