= Ardharathiri =

1969 film by P. Sambasiva Rao

- Poster
- Directed by: P. Sambasiva Rao
- Written by: Aarudhra
- Produced by: P. Gangadara Rao
- Starring: Jaggayya; Bharathi
- Cinematography: J. Sathyanarayana
- Edited by: S. P. S. Veerappa
- Music by: Master Venu
- Production company: Hyderabad Movies
- Release date: 12 April 1969
- Country: India
- Language: Telugu

Ardharathiri (Midnight) is a 1969 Indian Telugu-language thriller film written by Aarudhra and directed by P. Sambasiva Rao in his debut. Inspired by the Charlotte Brontë novel Jane Eyre, the film stars Jaggayya and Bharathi. It was released on 12 April 1969 and became a commercial success.

== Cast ==
Adapted from The Hindu:

- Jaggayya as Sridhar
- Bharathi as Sarala
- V. Nagayya as Dharmarao
- Mannava Balayya as Prasad
- Ramana Reddy as Panakala Rao
- Raavi Kondala Rao as Keshav
- Radhika as Panakala Rao's daughter
- Kalpana as Rani

== Production ==
P. Sambasiva Rao's desire to direct a thriller film arose after he read the Charlotte Brontë novel Jane Eyre. He, Aarudhra and Polavarapu Srihari Rao then created the story of the film Ardharathiri, taking inspiration from the novel while new characters and situations were created to suit the tastes of Telugu-speaking audience. As Sambasiva Rao put it, "In evolving the characters of Prasad and Keshav, traces of influence can be found in Emily Brontë's Wuthering Heights". The film marked his directorial debut and was produced by P. Gangadara Rao under Hyderabad Movies. Cinematography was handled by J. Sathyanarayana and editing by S. P. S. Veerappa.

== Soundtrack ==
The soundtrack was composed by Master Venu. The song "Ee Pilupu Nee Kosame" is based on "Kahin Deep Jale Kahin Dil" from the 1962 Hindi film Bees Saal Baad (1962).

- "Ee Pilupu Ni Kosame" - P. Susheela (lyrics: Aarudra)
- "Ee Oori Dhanni" - B.R. Latha (lyrics: Kosaraju)
- "Egiri Poyina Chilu" - L.R. Eswari, Apparao Nagabhyru (lyrics: Aarudra)
- "Kaipekkinche Kammani Reyi" - S. Janaki (lyrics: Dasaradhi)
- "Oho Andamantha" - S. P. Balasubrahmanyam, B. R. Latha (lyrics: Aarudra)

== Release and reception ==
Ardharathiri was released on 12 April 1969, and became a commercial success.
