= Penn Kulathin Pon Vilakku =

- Poster
- Directed by: B. Vittalacharya
- Screenplay by: Muhavai Rajamanickam
- Produced by: S. Soundappan; C. Chennakesavan
- Starring: Gemini Ganesan; M. N. Rajam
- Cinematography: J. G. Vijayam
- Edited by: P. G. Mohan
- Music by: M. Venu
- Production company: Asoka Pictures
- Release date: 10 July 1959
- Country: India
- Language: Tamil

Penn Kulathin Pon Vilakku (transl. Golden Lamp of Womanhood) is a 1959 Indian Tamil language film directed by B. Vittalacharya. The film stars Gemini Ganesan and M. N. Rajam. It was released on 10 July 1959.

== Plot ==
The film deals with three women – Parvathi, a perfect wife and an epitome of womanhood, her sister-in-law Kala, a staunch believer in woman's liberation, and Kala's friend Lalitha, a divorcee, who has no qualms about living with anyone for a little wealth. Kodandam, a self-proclaimed bachelor, comes to Kala's house to teach her music. He is forcibly married to her and is burdened with the task of taming the shrew. The rest of the movie deals with the lessons the women learn through the experiences they undergo in life.

== Cast ==
Cast list are from the film credits.

Male cast

- Gemini Ganesan
- M. N. Nambiar
- P. V. Narasimha Bharathi
- A. Karunanidhi
- S. A. Asokan B.A.
- K. K. Soundar
- Nagesh
- S. R. Gopal

Female cast

- M. N. Rajam
- Sriranjani
- K. V. Shanthi
- C. K. Saraswathi
- Vittoba
- Kalyani Ammal

Dance

- Sukumari-Mathangi

== Soundtrack ==
Music was scored by M. Venu.

Song	Singer/s	Lyricist	Duration(m:ss)
"Kadavul Padaikkavillai"	M. L. Vasanthakumari & P. Leela	Villiputhan	
"Vinothamaana Ulagathile"	Seergazhi Govindarajan	Villiputhan	03:35
"Vizhivaasal Azhagaana Manimandapam"	Seergazhi Govindarajan; P. Susheela	Villiputhan	03:26
"Vanakkam Vaanga Maappille"	Seergazhi Govindarajan; P. Susheela	Villiputhan	04:02
"Maalaiyitta Mangai Ival"	C. S. Jayaraman	Villiputhan	03:15
"Patta Kaalile Padum"	P. Leela	Muhavai Rajamanickam	03:09
"Vanna malarkodiyaalaiye"	K. Jamuna Rani	Muhavai Rajamanickam	02:37
"Ambigai Nee Gathiye Thaye"	P. Leela	Muhavai Rajamanickam	
"Pattu Pattaadai Katti"	K. Jamuna Rani; Salem Govindan	Muhavai Rajamanickam	02:19
"Kaalamellaam Aha"	K. Jamuna Rani	Muhavai Rajamanickam	
