= T. K. Swaminatha Pillai =

Swaminatha Pillai with his brother and family in 1961

Thiruvalaputhur Swaminatha Pillai (died 13 March 1972) was a flute artist from Tamil Nadu. He was from Pandanallur.

== Early life ==
T K Swaminatha Pillai was born as the first son of well-known dancer, Tiruvalaputtur Kalyani Ammal. His family, which belongs to the Isai Vellalar community, hails from the Tiruvalaputur village in the Mayiladudurai taluk of the Tanjore district. Swaminatha Pillai has one younger brother and two younger sisters who were also Bharathanatyam dancers. The brother was a violinist. Thiruvalaputhur Krishnamoorthy Pillai was awarded Kalaimamani award from the tamil nadu state government. He accompanied vocalists like M.S.Subbulakshmi, N.C.Vasanthakokilam, Madurai Somu etc.,

== Dancing career ==
As a child, Pillai was from his young age interested in the Arts and turned his attention towards dance right from childhood . To learn Bharatanatyam, he became a disciple of the guru Panthanallur Meenakshi Sundaram Pillai, spending more than 12 years in his gurukulam. Along with his guru, he conducted several dance events and taught dance to several students. Later, he shifted to Chennai and joined Vazhuvur Ramaiyya Pillai as a dance teacher.

== Family ==
Swaminatha Pillai has only one son. He was involved in the Indian independence movement, but refused to accept the concessions meant for freedom fighters. He served as a Councilor of Kumbakonam for three consecutive times.

== Disciples ==
Pillai's dance students include Vazhuvur Samraj, L. Vijayalakshmi, Swamimalai Rajarathnam Pillai, Hema Malini and Shripriya.

== Awards and recognition ==
Pillai received the Kalaimamani Award from the Tamil Nadu Government under the chief minister Annadurai. He also received the National Award from the President of India, V. V. Giri.
