= Pooja Phalam =

- Theatrical release poster
- Directed by: B. N. Reddy
- Written by: D. V. Narasa Raju (dialogues)
- Screenplay by: B. N. Reddy
- Based on: Poojari by Munipalle Raju
- Produced by: Daggupathi Lakshminarayana Chowdary
- Starring: Akkineni Nageswara Rao; Savitri; Jamuna
- Cinematography: U. Rajagopal
- Music by: S. Rajeswara Rao
- Production company: Sri Sambu Pictures
- Release date: 1 January 1964
- Running time: 156 minutes
- Country: India
- Language: Telugu

Pooja Phalam (transl. Fruit of prayer) is a 1964 Indian Telugu-language drama film directed and co-written by B. N. Reddy. It stars Akkineni Nageswara Rao, Savitri and Jamuna, with music composed by S. Rajeswara Rao. The film is based on the novel Poojari, written by Munipalle Raju.

== Cast ==
- Akkineni Nageswara Rao as Madhu
- Savitri as Seeta
- Jamuna as Vasanthi
- Jaggayya as Sriram
- Gummadi as Ramakrishnaiah
- Relangi as Govinda Rao
- Ramana Reddy as Govindaiah
- Mikkilineni as Bheemudu
- Peketi Sivaram as Nityanandam
- Potti Prasad as Raja
- L. Vijayalakshmi as Neela Nagini
- Rajasree as Rani
- Hemalatha as Vasanthi's mother
- Chhaya Devi

== Soundtrack ==
Pooja Phalam

Film score by S. Rajeswara Rao
- Released: 1964
- Recorded: 27:38
- Genre: Soundtrack
- Label: EMI Columbia Audio
- Producer: S. Rajeswara Rao

Music composed by S. Rajeswara Rao. The track "Pagale Vennela" is set in Raga Hindolam/Malkauns.

S. No.	Song title	Lyrics	Singers	length
1	"Pagale Vennela Jagame Ooyala"	C. Narayana Reddy	S. Janaki	2:57
2	"Ninnaleni Andamedo"	C. Narayana Reddy	Ghantasala	4:03
3	"Endhu Dagi Unnavo"	Devulapalli	P. Susheela	2:03
4	"Madhana Manasayera"	C. Narayana Reddy	S. Janaki	2:56
5	"Neruthuno Ledho"	C. Narayana Reddy	P. Susheela	3:30
6	"Andhena Ee Chethula"	Devulapalli	P. Susheela	3:01
7	"O Basthi Doragaru"	Kosaraju	B. Vasantha, Basaveshwar	2:44
8	"Siva Dheeksha"	Ghanam Seenayya	S. Janaki	4:47
9	"Vasthavu Pothavu"	C. Narayana Reddy	B. Vasantha	1:37
