= Manchi Manishi =

- Theatrical release poster
- Directed by: K. Pratyagatma
- Screenplay by: K. Pratyagatma
- Story by: Pinisetty
- Produced by: K. Subba Raju
- Starring: N. T. Rama Rao; Jamuna; Jaggayya
- Cinematography: M. K. Raju
- Edited by: Anki Reddy
- Music by: S. Rajeswara Rao; T. Chalapathi Rao
- Production company: Chaya Chitra
- Release date: 11 November 1964
- Running time: 165 minutes
- Country: India
- Language: Telugu

Manchi Manishi (transl. Good Man) is a 1964 Indian Telugu-language drama film, produced by K. Subba Raju under the Chaya Chitra banner and directed by K. Pratyagatma. It stars N. T. Rama Rao, Jamuna and Jaggayya, with music jointly composed by S. Rajeswara Rao and T. Chalapathi Rao.

== Cast ==
- N. T. Rama Rao as Venu
- Jamuna as Susheela
- Jaggayya as Vasu
- Gummadi as Justice Ranganatham
- Mikkilineni as Veerayya
- Ramana Reddy as Venkataswamy Senior
- Padmanabham as Venkataswamy Junior
- Raja Babu as Dorakadu
- Balaiah as DSP
- Tyagaraju
- Jagga Rao
- Boddapati as Setti
- Geetanjali as Rani
- Hemalatha as Shantamma
- Sandhya
- P. Lakshmikanthamma as Suramma

== Soundtrack ==
Manchi Manishi

Film score by S. Rajeswara Rao T. Chalapathi Rao
- Released: 1964
- Genre: Soundtrack
- Length: 23:27
- Label: His Master's Voice
- Producers: S. Rajeswara Rao; T. Chalapathi Rao

Music composed by S. Rajeswara Rao and T. Chalapathi Rao. Music released His Master's Voice.

S. No.	Song title	Lyrics	Singers	length
1	"Dopidi Dopidi Dopidi"	Kosaraju	Madhavapeddi Satyam, Pithapuram	4:27
2	"Emandoi Emandoi"	Kosaraju	Ghantasala	3:46
3	"Antaga Nanu Choodaku"	C. Narayana Reddy	Ghantasala, P. Susheela	3:48
4	"Rananuunnavemo"	Sri Sri	Ghantasala, P. Susheela	3:43
5	"Ponnakayavanti Police"	Kosaraju	Madhavapeddi Satyam, S. Janaki	3:49
6	"Oho Gulabi Bala"	Dasaradhi	P. B. Srinivas	3:54
