= Chenchu Lakshmi (1958 film) =

1958 film

- Theatrical release poster
- Directed by: B. A. Subba Rao
- Written by: Vempati Sadasivabrahmam (Telugu dialogues); Thanjai N. Ramaiah Dass; M. S. Subramaniam (Tamil dialogues)
- Screenplay by: B. A. Subba Rao
- Story by: Vempati Sadasivabrahmam
- Produced by: B. A. Subba Rao
- Starring: Akkineni Nageswara Rao; Anjali Devi
- Cinematography: C. Nageswara Rao
- Edited by: K. Marthandam
- Music by: S. Rajeswara Rao
- Production company: B.A.S. Productions
- Distributed by: Navayuga Films
- Release date: 9 April 1958
- Running time: 145 minutes
- Country: India
- Languages: Telugu; Tamil

Chenchu Lakshmi is a 1958 Indian Hindu mythological film produced and directed by B. A. Subba Rao. The film stars Akkineni Nageswara Rao and Anjali Devi, with music composed by S. Rajeswara Rao. It was simultaneously shot in Telugu and Tamil languages, with most of the actors and scenes being the same in both versions. Another Chenchu Lakshmi was earlier made in 1943 with a different cast and crew.

== Cast ==
Character	Telugu	Tamil
Lord Vishnu	Akkineni Nageswara Rao	Akkineni Nageswara Rao
Goddess Lakshmi and Chenchita (Dual role)	Anjali Devi	Anjali Devi
Hiranyakashipu	S. V. Ranga Rao	S. V. Ranga Rao
Durvasa	Gummadi	C. V. V. Panthulu
Narada Maharshi	Relangi	K. A. Thangavelu
Samudrudu	E. R. Sahadevan	E. R. Sahadevan
Lord Shiva	Nagabhushanam	Nagabhushanam
Chandamarkula	Vangara Venkata Subbaiah	Vangara Venkata Subbaiah
Leelavathi	Pushpavalli	Pushpavalli
Queen of the Chenchus	Sandhya	Sandhya
	Rushyendramani	Rushyendramani
Prahlada	Master Babji	Master Babji
Dancer	E. V. Saroja	E. V. Saroja
	A. V. Subba Rao	A. V. Subba Rao
	Nalla Rama Murthy	Nalla Rama Murthy
	K. S. Angamuthu	K. S. Angamuthu

== Soundtrack ==
Music was composed by S. Rajeswara Rao. All the tunes for all the songs for both languages are the same.

Telugu songs

Lyrics by Arudra, Tapi Dharma Rao, Kosaraju, Vempati Sadasivabrahmam, Samudrala Sr. & Pothana.

Song title	Lyrics	Singers	length
"Aanandamaye Ali Neelaveni"	Arudra	Ghantasala & Jikki	4:18
"Chettulekkagalava O Narahari"	Arudra	Ghantasala & Jikki	3:07
"Chilaka Gorinka"	Vempati Sadasivabrahmam	Ghantasala & Jikki	2:54
"Paala Kadalipai"	Arudra	P. Susheela	3:23
"Adhigo Kanalera Kamala"	Samudrala Sr.	P. Susheela	3:10
"Neelagagana Ghana Shyama"	Arudra	Ghantasala	4:32
"Kaanaga Raavaa"	Vempati Sadasivabrahmam	Ghantasala & Jikki	3:26
"Cheyi Cheyi"	Kosaraju	Jikki & T. Sathyavathi	3:15
"Ambari Lambaarihori"	Kosaraju	Pithapuram Nageswara Rao & A. P. Komala	2:58
"Ma Chinni Papayi"	Samudrala Sr	P. Susheela	2:04
"Marapuraani Manchi Roju"	Vempati Sadasivabrahmam	Ghantasala & Jikki	5:33
"Karunaala Vaalaa"	Kosaraju	Ghantasala	7:14
"Sri Nadhuni"	Samudrala Sr.	P. Susheela	2:36
"Chenchu Lakshmi Slokam"	Vempati Sadasivabrahmam	P. Susheela	10:03
"Dimbhaka Sarva Sthalamula"	Arudra	Madhavapeddi Satyam	
"Srihariye Natana Sutradari"	Arudra	Ghantasala	
"Yevadura Vishnundu Yevadiraa Jishnundu"	Arudra	Madhavapeddi Satyam	
"Parabhavammunu Sahintuna"	Arudra	Madhavapeddi Satyam	
"Yededu Lokala Elikaa Neepaina"	Arudra	Ghantasala	
"Maa Chinni Papayi"	Vempati Sadasiva Brahmam	Jikki	
"Maha Saktimantulaina Nijam Teliyalerayyo"	Arudra	Ghantasala	
"Brahma Ichina Varamulu"	Arudra	Ghantasala	
"Nadu Hiranyakasipudanargala"	Tapi Dharma Rao	Ghantasala	
"Akhila Jagamulakunu"	Arudra	P. B. Sreenivas	
"Chilaka Gorinka Kulike Paka Paka"	Arudra	P. B. Sreenivas & P. Susheela	
"Patutara Neeti Sastrachaya"		Madhavapeddi Satyam	
"Srinathuni Pada Sarasija Bhajane"	Samudrala Sr.	P. Susheela	
"Chettulekka Galava O Narahari"	Vempati Sadasivabrahmam	P. B. Sreenivas & P. Susheela	2:43
"Hey Deva Divyaprabhava"	Vempati Sadasiva Brahmam	P. Susheela	
"Chadhivinchiri Nanu Guruvulu"	Pothana	P. Susheela	
"Kanjakshunakugani Kayambu"	Pothana	P. Susheela	
"Kantha Cheti Lopala"	Arudra	Ghantasala	
"Neelagagana Ghanasyama Deva"	Arudra	Ghantasala	
"Adhinadhuni Patnikuda"	Arudra	Ghantasala	

Tamil songs

Lyrics by Papanasam Sivan, Thanjai N. Ramaiah Dass & M. S. Subramaniam.

Song	Lyrics	Singers	Length (m:ss)
Aanandham Eedhe Alidula Veni		Ghantasala & Jikki	04:13
Maratthil Eruvaayaa Ye Singga Manadhil		Ghantasala & Jikki	02:17
Anbe En Raaja Assai Kannaalane		Ghantasala & Jikki	02:38
Naaraayanaa Hari Naaraayanaa Sriman	Papanasam Sivan	P. Susheela	03:23
Naaraayanan Thiru Adi Malar Panindhu		P. Susheela	02:47
Vidhiyai Vellum Valimai Amma Unakku Illaiye		Ghantasala	01:00
Sri Hari Dheva Jegame Pugazh Jeeva		Ghantasala & Jikki	03:09
Oyilu Kummi Podalaam Ullaasamaai		Jikki & T. Sathyavathi	03:22
Lambaadi Lambaadi Hoi Lambaadi		M. Sathyam & P. S. Vaidhehi	02:58
Paal Kadal Thanile Sesha Sayanatthil		P. Susheela	02:54
Mangai Endhan Manadhil Inbam		Ghantasala & Jikki	05:01
Uyar Karunaamoorthi Perumai Avar Kanndaar		Ghantasala	02:44
Dhargamudan Viyaagaranam Sangeetham		P. Susheela	04:00
Undhanai Pol Dheivam Undo Dhevaa		P. Susheela	01:54
Paarkadal Thanile Palli Konde Endrum		Seerkazhi Govindarajan	00:51
Sri Hariye Sagala Soothradhaari		Ghantasala	00:40
Alitthidum Avamadhippaiyai Naan Nasukkuven		V. N. Sundaram	02:32
Vidha Vidhamaagave Vedanggal Aniyum		Seerkazhi Govindarajan	00:45
Eerezhu Loganggal Koorume Un Perai		Ghantasala	01:13
Chandhrodhayam Pole Indha Jegam Meedhile		Jikki	01:59
Gaandha Sakthi Enavo Kai Padave		Ghantasala	00:44
Bramma Sittha Niyaayatthilum Unnmai Purivadhedhu		Ghantasala	01:01
Andha Naal Arakkan Iraniyan Arundhava Palanil		Ghantasala	00:26
Agila Jegamadhil Aadhi Naadhan		Ghantasala	01:26
Inngiruppaano Anggiruppaano Endra Iyame		V. N. Sundaram & P. Susheela	02:58
