= Miss Mary (1957 film) =

- Poster
- Directed by: L. V. Prasad
- Written by: Rajendra Krishan (dialogues)
- Screenplay by: Aluri Chakrapani
- Produced by: A. V. Meiyappan
- Starring: Meena Kumari; Kishore Kumar; Ganesh
- Cinematography: T. Muthuswamy
- Edited by: K. Shankar
- Music by: Hemant Kumar
- Production company: AVM Productions
- Distributed by: AVM Productions
- Release date: 15 February 1957
- Country: India
- Language: Hindi

Miss Mary is a 1957 Indian Hindi-language comedy film directed by L. V. Prasad. The film is an AVM Production and directed by L. V. Prasad. The film is a remake of Prasad's 1955 Telugu-Tamil bilingual film Missamma / Missiamma, which itself was a remake of the 1932 Bengali play Maanmoyee Girls' School. It stars Meena Kumari in the titular role, Kishore Kumar and Gemini Ganesan (credited as Ganesh). The music was by Hemant Kumar with the lyrics and dialogue written by Rajendra Krishan. The songs were sung by Kishore Kumar, Lata Mangeshkar, Asha Bhosle, Geeta Dutt and Mohammed Rafi.

Meena Kumari, who was to later become famous for her tragedy roles meriting the sobriquet "The Tragedy Queen", acted in a few light-hearted roles in the 1950s in films such as Azaad (1955), Mem Sahib (1956), Shararat, Kohinoor (1960) and Miss Mary. Miss Mary was one of the biggest hits of that year.

== Plot ==
The story is about Arun (Ganesh), an unemployed teacher who comes across an advertisement offering a job at the Laxmi School with the proviso that only married couples should apply. He meets Miss Mary (Meena Kumari), a Christian girl who is badly in need of a job to pay off her parents' debt. Arun suggests that she pose as his wife after he witnesses her getting harassed by John (Randhir), her potential suitor to which her father owes money. They hire Nakdau (Om Prakash), a beggar-cum-conman as a servant to keep up the pretense. The school owners (Rai Saheb and his wife), are looking for their long lost daughter Laxmi (hence the Laxmi School), who went missing sixteen years ago and the only thing tying her to them is a locket and an identification mark in the form of a mole on her left foot. They employ a detective Raju (Kishore Kumar) and his sidekick Chandragupta (Maruti) to find her. Raju is an orphan brought up as a nephew by the Rai Saheb. The old couple find a resemblance in Mary to their daughter and show her a photo of Laxmi that looks like her. Mary tells them that she can't be their daughter as she was brought up in a Christian environment by Christian parents.

Mary feels bad for lying about her married status to the Rai Saheb and his wife. She and Arun start liking each other in spite of their constant bickering. The owner's other daughter and Mary's biological sister Sita (Jamuna) has a fondness for Arun which upsets Mary. There are several comic sequences involving Raju and Chandragupta. The truth is revealed about Mary being the Rai Saheb's daughter Laxmi when her foster parents arrive.

== Cast ==
- Meena Kumari as Laxmi / Miss Mary
- Kishore Kumar as Raju
- Gemini Ganesan as Arun
- Jamuna as Sita
- Achala Sachdev as Laxmi and Sita's mother
- Jagdish Sethi as Rai Saheb, Laxmi and Sita's father
- Randhir as John
- Om Prakash as Nakdau
- Karunanidhi as Karunanidhi
- Maruti as Chandragupta
- Shivraj as a Christian priest and Laxmi's foster father
- Kesari as Vaidji

== Production ==
B. Nagi Reddi, the producer of the original, was insistent on having L. V. Prasad direct the Hindi remake. Gemini Ganesan (credited as Ganesh) reprised his role from the Tamil original Missiamma (1955) since Prasad felt that "there was no one who could do a dignified comedy in Hindi". Jamuna, who was a part of both the Telugu original Missamma (1955) and Missiamma, reprised her role for the Hindi remake. Kishore Kumar after spending five days idling in a hotel room, got fed up and starting cutting his hair on one side. He started cutting on the other side, and since he overdid it, he continuously cut his hair until he was called to come on set when he did not have much hair anymore.

== Themes and influences ==
Arun teaches Sita music using a piano, which was common in Hindi films of that time to signify wealth.

Gemini Ganesan was credited with introducing a fresh touch of "well-groomed, sophisticated South Indian youth" into the Hindi film hero persona.

== Soundtrack ==
The music and background score was composed by Hemant Kumar and the lyrics were penned by Rajendra Krishan. All of the songs are different from the original soundtrack except for the song "Brindavan Ka Krishna Kanhaiya", which was reused from the song titled "Brindaavanamadi Andaridi" in Telugu and "Brindavanamum Nandakumaranu" in Tamil.

The songs were popular, especially "Gaana Na Aaya, Bajaana Na Aaya" sung by Kishore Kumar, "Yeh Mard Bade Dilsard, Bade Bedard", "O Raat Ke Musafir Chanda Zara Bata De", "Brindavan Ka Krishna Kanhaiya" sung by Lata Mangeshkar and Mohammed Rafi. Lata Mangeshkar and Asha Bhosle, who first sang together in Ladli (1949), had a duet in the film: "Sakhi Ri Sun Bole Papiha Us Paar". Asha, despite her lack of training from her father Dinanath Mangeshkar and other Ustads, was able to follow Lata ably in her sargam-taan, keeping "perfect timing".

Sukhpreet Kahlon of Cinestaan wrote that "Although Kishore Kumar isn't the hero of this film, he displays his musical talent in the song "Gaana Na Aaya". With lyrics like "O My Sita" and "Paplu Papita", the song is a nutty medley of various music forms and styles, which includes the nursery rhyme "Three Blind Mice".

=== Track listing ===
Song	Singer(s)	Ref.
"Gaana Na Aaya, Bajaana Na Aaya	Kishore Kumar	
"Sakhi Ri Sun Bole Papiha Us Paar"	Lata Mangeshkar, Asha Bhosle	
"Saiyan Lag Jaa Gale, Aaja Mera Dil Jale"	Lata Mangeshkar	
"So Gaya Saara Jahan"	Lata Mangeshkar	
"Yeh Mard Bade Dilsard Bade Bedard" (Female)	Lata Mangeshkar	
"Yeh Mard Bade Dilsard Bade Bedard" (Male)	Mohammed Rafi	
"Pehle Paisa Phir Bhagwaan	Mohammed Rafi	
"Brindavan Ka Krishna Kanhaiya"	Lata Mangeshkar, Mohammed Rafi	
"O Raat Ke Musafir Chanda Zara Bata De"	Lata Mangeshkar, Mohammed Rafi	
"Aayi Re Ghir Ghir Pehli Pehli Baadariya	Geeta Dutt	

Two songs are set in Hindustani ragas: "Sakhi Ri Sun Bole Papiha Us Paar" (Khamaj) and "Brindavan Ka Krishna Kanhaiya" (Pahadi).

== Reception ==
Meher Baba and his disciple Mehera saw the film in Pune after being recommended the film by Baba's brother Jal, who said that the film was enjoyable. Despite the film's box office success, Gemini Ganesan failed to establish a career in Hindi cinema.

In 2012, a critic from The Hindu wrote that "If Prasad's direction is deft, camerawork by Muthuswami, aided by set designing of Shantaram, gives you alluring pictorial moments. A large credit for the film's appeal is also because of the slick editing by K. Shankar which never allows any scene to drag. So despite a fluffy story, watch Miss Mary for all the above reasons". In 2015, Deepa Gahlot in her book Take-2: 50 Films That Deserve a New Audience, wrote that "Miss Mary had a rather bold plot for 1957 – an unmarried young woman pretending to be the wife of a stranger, for the sake of a job!" and concluded that "It must have been refreshing for audiences to watch a light hearted romance. It still is". In 2022, a writer from IANS wrote that "Though typecast as a tragedienne, she [Meena Kumari] could do comic roles with aplomb too as seen in films such as Miss Mary (1957), Shararat (1959) and Kohinoor (1960) but she never got much of a chance. This was perhaps her biggest tragedy".
