= Raithu Bidda (1971 film) =

- Theatrical release poster
- Directed by: B. A. Subba Rao
- Written by: Pinisetti (dialogues)
- Screenplay by: B. A. Subba Rao
- Story by: G. Balasubrahmanyam
- Produced by: Kotla Venkata Ramayya
- Starring: N. T. Rama Rao; Vanisri
- Cinematography: J. Satyanarayana
- Edited by: Marthand
- Music by: S. Hanumantha Rao
- Production company: Lakshmi Kala Films
- Release date: 19 May 1971
- Running time: 172 mins
- Country: India
- Language: Telugu

Raithu Bidda (transl. Son of the farmer/soil) is a 1971 Indian Telugu-language drama film directed by B. A. Subba Rao. It stars N. T. Rama Rao and Vanisri, and the soundtrack was composed by S. Hanumantha Rao. It was produced by Kotla Venkata Ramayya under the Lakshmi Kala Films banner.

== Cast ==
- N. T. Rama Rao as Ramu
- Vanisri as Santha
- Jaggayya as Prasad
- Rajanala as Pullayya
- Satyanarayana as Bhushayya
- Allu Ramalingaiah as Seshayya
- Raja Babu as Yellayya
- Sridhar as District Collector
- Ch. Krishna Murthy as Dharmayya
- Santha Kumari as Lakshmi Devi
- Chaya Devi as Sundaramma
- Anuradha as Radha
- Prasanna Rani as Sarada

== Music ==
Raitu Bidda

Film score by S. Hanumantha Rao
- Released: 1971
- Genre: Soundtrack
- Length: 36:45
- Producer: S. Hanumantha Rao

Music was composed by S. Hanumantha Rao.

S. No.	Song title	Lyrics	Singers	length
1	"Devudu Srushtinchaadu Lokaalu"	Kosaraju	Ghantasala	4:12
2	"A Amma Aa Aavu"	C. Narayana Reddy	P. Susheela	4:12
3	"A Anuragam Aa Aanandam"	C. Narayana Reddy	Ghantasala, P. Susheela	3:31
4	"Virisina Marumalli"	C. Narayana Reddy	S. P. Balasubrahmanyam, P. Susheela	4:00
5	"Addaretiri Niddara Podduna"	Kosaraju	Madhavapeddi, L. R. Eswari	4:14
6	"Raite Rajyam Elaali"	Kosaraju	Ghantasala, P. Susheela	4:28
7	"Manishini Nammite"	C. Narayana Reddy	Joshi	2:53
8	"Raju Rani"	C. Narayana Reddy	S. P. Balasubrahmanyam, Madhavpeddi, L. R. Eswari	9:15
