= Sivaramapuram =

- village
- Interactive map of Sivaramapuram
- Location in Andhra Pradesh, India Sivaramapuram (India)
- Coordinates: 18°32′06″N 83°14′37″E
- Country: India
- State: Andhra Pradesh
- District: Parvathipuram Manyam
- Established: since 1900

Government
  - Type: democracy
- Elevation: 113 m (371 ft)

Population (2001)
  - Total: 2,357

Languages
  - Official: Telugu
- Time zone: UTC+5:30 (IST)
- Postal code: 535591
- Vehicle registration: AP

Sivarampuram or Sivaramapuram is a village panchayat in Salur mandal of Parvathipuram Manyam district in Andhra Pradesh, India.

== Geography ==
Sivarampuram is located at 18.5333°N 83.2333°E. It has an average elevation of 113 meters (374 feet).

== Demographics ==
As of 2001 Indian census, the demographic details of Sivarampuram village is as follows:

- Total Population: 2,357 in 605 Households
- Male Population: 1,214 and Female Population: 1,143
- Children Under 6-years of age: 413 (Boys - 205 and Girls - 208)
- Total Literates: 1,085
