= Missiamma =

1955 film by L. V. Prasad

- Theatrical release poster
- Directed by: L. V. Prasad
- Written by: Thanjai N. Ramaiah Dass (dialogues)
- Screenplay by: Aluri Chakrapani
- Based on: Manmoyee Girls School by Rabindranath Maitra
- Produced by: B. Nagi Reddy; Aluri Chakrapani
- Starring: R. Ganesh; Savitri; K. A. Thangavelu; Jamuna
- Cinematography: Marcus Bartley
- Edited by: C. P. Jambulingam; G. Kalyanasundaram
- Music by: S. Rajeswara Rao
- Production company: Vijaya Productions
- Distributed by: Vijaya Productions
- Release date: 14 January 1955
- Running time: 179 minutes
- Country: India
- Language: Tamil

Missiamma (transl. Miss Madam) is a 1955 Indian Tamil-language romantic comedy film directed by L. V. Prasad. Produced by B. Nagi Reddy and Aluri Chakrapani's Vijaya Vauhini Studios, the script was adapted by Chakrapani from the Bengali play Manmoyee Girls School by Rabindranath Maitra. Missiamma also focused on social issues such as unemployment, corruption, and freedom of worship. Missiamma tells the story of two unemployed people of different religions and mentalities: Balu and Mary. They pose as a married couple to obtain jobs in a high school founded by Gopal, the zamindar of Aandipettai. As Balu and Mary fall in love, Gopal's nephew Raju (an amateur detective) learns that Mary is Gopal's missing elder daughter Mahalakshmi; she is unaware of her true identity.

Production began in early 1954. The film was simultaneously shot in Telugu as Missamma, with an altered cast. P. Bhanumathi was originally cast as the female lead, with R. Ganesh playing the male lead. After a dispute with Bhanumathi, Chakrapani replaced her with Savitri. K. A. Thangavelu, Jamuna, S. V. Ranga Rao, Rushyendramani, and K. Sarangapani were cast in supporting roles while M. N. Nambiar was cast as the antagonist. C. P. Jambulingam and Kalyanam edited the film; Marcus Bartley was the cinematographer, and S. Rajeswara Rao composed the music.

Principal photography took place in and around Madras (now Chennai) and wrapped in December 1954. Missiamma was released in theatres on 14 January 1955, two days after Missamma. Both versions were commercially successful, completing 100-day theatrical runs. The bilingual film brought recognition to its cast and studio. AVM Productions remade the film in Hindi as Miss Mary in 1957, with Ganesan and Jamuna reprising their roles.

== Plot ==
The Zamindar runs a school in the village Aandipettai. He wants to replace the existing teacher with someone with higher qualification. He decides to appoint a husband and wife couple as head master and wife. When he advertised in the papers, a Hindu young man who is looking for a job wants to apply for it. But he is not married. By circumstances he meets an unmarried young girl who is looking for a way to earn some money to set off a loan taken by her father. But she is a Christian. However, the young man and young woman come to an understanding and present themselves as husband and wife to the Zamindar. He appoints them as headmaster and teacher. The young woman also teaches music to the Zamindar's daughter.

Zamindar and his wife lost their elder daughter 15 years ago in a temple festival. In fact, he named the school after the lost child, Mahalakshmi. Now the young woman teacher reminds them of their elder daughter and they shower love on her.

A nephew of the Zamindar who is a self-styled detective, takes it upon himself to search and find the missing child.

After some confusion and much banter, it comes to light that the young woman teacher is actually the lost child of the Zamindar. The family re-unites. The young man and the young woman who came pretending as husband and wife marry each other and become real couple at the end.

== Cast ==
Male cast

- R. Ganesh as Balu
- K. A. Thangavelu as Raju
- S. V. Ranga Rao as Zamindar Gopal
- K. Sarangapani as Lohidasan
- M. N. Nambiar as David
- V. M. Ezhumalai as School teacher
- A. Karunanidhi as Pandiya
- Duraisamy as Paul Jeevarathnam
- M. R. Santhanam as Interviewer

Female cast

- Savithri as Mary and then Mahalakshmi
- Jamuna as Sita
- Rushyendramani as Kamakshi, Zamindar's wife
- Meenakshi as Mrs. Paul

== Production ==
=== Development ===
B. Nagi Reddy and Aluri Chakrapani signed L. V. Prasad to direct a bilingual film for Vijaya Vauhini Studios. The film's script, by Chakrapani, was based on Rabindranath Maitra's Bengali play Manmoyee Girls School. Prasad's relationship with Khan, a Muslim tailor near Kohinoor Studios in Bombay (now Mumbai), was the basis of the film's friendship between two men of different religions. The film was titled Missamma in Telugu and Missiamma in Tamil.

Thanjai N. Ramaiah Dass wrote the dialogues for Missiamma. Marcus Bartley was signed as director of photography, and C. P. Jambulingam and G. Kalyanasundaram edited the film. Madhavapeddi Gokhale and Kaladhar were its art directors. The film was processed at Vijaya Laboratory and recorded by Western Electric. M. S. Chalapathi Rao and Jagannadham were its executive producers.

=== Casting ===
Although Pathala Bhairavi (1951) and Pelli Chesi Choodu (1952) were the first bilingual films shot in Telugu and Tamil, the same actors were used in both versions. Missiamma was the first bilingual film from Vijaya Vauhini Studios with different male actors. P. Bhanumathi was cast as the female lead, and Gemini Ganesan (then known as R. Ganesh) was cast as the male lead in Missiamma, while N. T. Rama Rao played the same role in Missamma. S. V. Ranga Rao and Rushyendramani and Doraswamy and Meenakshi were cast as the title character's biological and foster parents, respectively, in both versions. Although all the actors in both versions used the same range of costumes, Ranga Rao wore a veshti for the Tamil version in accordance with Tamil custom.

Prasad had completed four reels of film with Bhanumathi. She wrote to the producers, informing them that she would shoot only in the afternoon because Varalakshmi Vratam was being held at her home. The letter went astray and Chakrapani, a strict disciplinarian, chastised her for arriving late on set. When Bhanumathi refused to apologise, Chakrapani burnt the four reels in front of her and she quit the film. Although Nagi Reddy learned about the letter and tried to mediate, Chakrapani and Bhanumathi refused to reconcile. Chakrapani ordered Prasad to replace Bhanumathi with Savitri, who was initially cast as Sita. Jamuna was signed later for Sita's role, upon Savitri's recommendation.

Savitri benefited the Tamil version by improving the on-screen chemistry with Ganesan; they had secretly married in 1952, before filming began. K. A. Thangavelu and K. Sarangapani reprise the roles that Akkineni Nageswara Rao and Relangi played in Telugu. M. N. Nambiar was cast as the antagonist.

=== Filming ===
Principal photography began in early 1954, with both versions (with different casts) filmed simultaneously. Photographs of Nagi Reddy's younger brother and cinematographer B. N. Konda Reddy's daughter (the latter as Gopalam's missing daughter) were used in the film. The scene where Ganesan's character persuades Savitri's character to pose as his wife was filmed at My Lady's Garden in Madras. For one sequence in his character jumps from a balcony, Ganesan refused a stunt double and performed the scene himself. He repeated this in Missamma, serving as Rama Rao's double. Filming was delayed because of Bhanumathi's exit and the difficulty of managing two casts simultaneously. Lasting for a year, it wrapped by the end of December 1954. After they saw the final edited version, Nagi Reddy and Chakrapani gave Dodge automobiles to the film's principal cast.

== Themes ==
Missiamma deals with themes like unemployment and freedom of religion. In her 2002 book Cinema of Interruptions: Action Genres in Contemporary Indian Cinema, Lalitha Gopalan wrote that male protagonists in Indian films use the piano to express desire and cited Gemini Ganesan in Missiamma as an example. Pa Dheenadhayalan of Dinamani described Mary as the antithesis of Savitri's role in Devadasu (1953).

== Music ==
The music was composed by S. Rajeswara Rao. The lyrics were penned by Thanjai N. Ramaiah Dass. Raaga Sudharasa, a Thyagarajah Krithi in Andolika Raga, was also included in the film. The playback singers are A. M. Rajah, P. Leela and P. Susheela. Piano is by Pianist Ramachandran Diwakar(Pianist Diwakar). "Ariya Paruvamada" was Susheela's first song for Rajeswara Rao. The song "Ennai Aalum Mary Maatha", picturised on Savitri's character, is an appeal to Virgin Mary. The song "Ariya Paruvamada" is set in the Carnatic raga known as Kharaharapriya, while "Brindavanamum Nandakumaranum" is set primarily in Shuddha Saveri, with parts of it in Arabhi and Devagandhari. Songs like "Vaarayo Vennilaave", "Brindavanamum Nandakumaranum", "Ennai Aalum Mary Maatha" and "Pazhaga Theriyavenum" became popular with the Tamil diaspora. The songs "Saami Dharmam Thalaikakkum" and "Sitaram Jai Sitaram" were performed by K. Sarangapani onscreen; however, neither feature on the soundtrack.

Track listing
No.	Title	Singer(s)	Length
1.	"Ariya Paruvamada"	P. Susheela	03:21
2.	"Vaarayo Vennilave"	A. M. Rajah, P. Leela	02:40
3.	"Raaga Rasaamrita (Tamil version of Tyagaraja Krithi Raaga Sudharasa)"	P. Leela, P. Susheela	03:24
4.	"Yellaam Unakke"	A. M. Rajah	03:18
5.	"Therinthu Kollanum"	P. Leela	02:31
6.	"Brindavanamum Nandakumaranum"	A. M. Rajah, P. Susheela	02:48
7.	"Mudiyum Endral"	A. M. Rajah	02:06
8.	"Pazhaga Theriyavenum"	A. M. Rajah	02:46
9.	"Maayame"	P. Leela	02:47
10.	"Yenai Aalum Mary Maathaa"	P. Leela	02:22
11.	"Sri Janaki"	P. Leela, P. Susheela	02:59
12.	"Dharmam Thalaikakkum" (Not included on soundtrack)	K. Sarangapani	02:23
13.	"Seetharam, Seetharam" (Not included on soundtrack)	K. Sarangapani	01:29

== Release ==
Missiamma was released in theatres on 14 January 1955, during Pongal, and two days after Missamma. It was a commercially success, completing a 100-day theatrical run.

== Reception ==
According to Swarnavel Eswaran Pillai's 2015 book Madras Studios, speculation about Savitri's real-life romance with Ganesan played a key role in the success of the film. A postage stamp commemorating Ganesan was introduced in Chennai in February 2006 by Dayanidhi Maran (the-then Minister of Communications and Information Technology) and Missiamma was shown for the occasion.

The February 1955 issue of Kumudam called Missiamma "an interesting film with quality humor": "In the beginning one is uneasy as to how the love affair of a Christian heroine and a Hindu hero is going to be retooled for a comedy", but Prasad "has used every difficult situation as an opportunity for boundless humor". It praised the "moonlit sequence" and Bartley's cinematography, and the magazine Gundoosi described Savitiri's acting as "the best so far". In L.V. Prasad : a monograph (1993), film historian K. N. T. Sastry wrote: "lf cinema was to be considered a tool to forget our worries — here indeed was entertainment: Missiamma answered that definition." In March 2005, film historian S. Theodore Baskaran commented on Ganesan's career best performances and found the one in Missiamma a "delightful" one; he added that the film was a "charming" one which provided breakthrough to Ganesan and Savitri in Tamil cinema.

== Remake ==
Gemini Ganesan reprised his role in AVM Productions' Hindi remake of the film, Miss Mary, which marked his Bollywood debut.

== Legacy ==
According to film historian Film News Anandan, Missiamma's success inspired filmmakers to cast different actors for different versions of their films. On 23 January 1955, a 19-year-old woman gave birth to a baby in the Roxy Theatre in Madras while watching Missiamma. Mother and daughter were rushed to Egmore Maternity Hospital, where the baby was named Missiamma. Missiamma's success made Ganesan adopt the screen name Gemini Ganesan to avoid confusion with Sivaji Ganesan, another popular actor in Tamil cinema. According to film historian Randor Guy, the success of Missiamma and other such romantic films earned Ganesan the tag "Kadhal Mannan" (King of Love). The film was a breakthrough in the careers of Savitri and Jamuna. Scenes from Missiamma were later featured in Kaadhal Mannan, a documentary on the life of Gemini Ganesan.

== Sources ==
- Baburao, V. (18 May 2005). మిస్సమ్మ - నిరుద్యోగ సమస్యపై వ్యంగ్యాస్త్రం [Missamma – A satire on Unemployment] (in Telugu). Navya Weekly.
- Gopalan, Lalitha (2002). Cinema of Interruptions: Action Genres in Contemporary Indian Cinema. British Film Institute. ISBN 978-0-85170-923-9.
- Pillai, Swarnavel Eswaran (2015). Madras Studios: Narrative, Genre, and Ideology in Tamil Cinema. SAGE Publications. ISBN 978-93-5150-212-8.
- Rajadhyaksha, Ashish; Willemen, Paul (1998) [1994]. Encyclopaedia of Indian Cinema. British Film Institute and Oxford University Press. ISBN 0-19-563579-5.
- Sastry, K. N. T. (1993). L.V. Prasad : a monograph. Wiley Eastern. ISBN 978-81-2240-504-0.
