= B. A. Subba Rao =

Indian Telugu film director

- Born: Bugata Venkata Subba Rao
- Died: 1987
- Occupations: Director, Producer
- Years active: 1950–1987

Bugata Venkata Subba Rao, better known as B. A. Subba Rao (died 1987), was an Indian film director and producer who predominantly worked in Telugu cinema. He is recipient of Raghupathi Venkaiah Award for his lifetime contribution to Telugu cinema.

He started his career in 1950 with Palletoori Pilla as writer, director and producer. He gave N. T. Rama Rao the first chance as a lead actor in this film. It was a minor commercial hit and both Subba Rao and Rama Rao gained a good reputation from it. He produced and directed Raju Peda in 1954 with Rama Rao in the lead role, based on the 1881 Mark Twain novel The Prince and the Pauper. He also produced some films like Chenchu Lakshmi (1958), and Bhishma (1962) under the banner of B. A. S. Productions.

When N. T. Rama Rao became the Chief Minister of Andhra Pradesh, he made Subba Rao the Chairman of the AP Film Development Corporation.

== Filmography ==
1. Palletoori Pilla in 1950 (writer, producer, and director)
2. Tingu Ranga in 1952 (producer and director)
3. Aada Bratuku in 1952 (director)
4. Shyamala in 1952 (director)
5. Raju Peda in 1954 (producer and director) Filmfare Best Film Award (Telugu)
6. Palle Paduchu in 1954 (director)
7. Rani Ratnaprabha in 1955 (producer and director)
8. Chenchu Lakshmi in 1958 (producer and Director)
9. Sahodari in 1959 (director)
10. Bhishma in 1962 (producer and director)
11. Marmayogi in 1964 (director)
12. Mohini Bhasmasura in 1966 (producer and director)
13. Pedda Akkayya in 1967 (director)
14. Bhale Tammudu in 1969 (director)
15. Raitu Bidda in 1971 (director)
16. Sati Anasuya in 1971 (director)
17. Ram Raheem in 1974
18. Moguda? Pellama? in 1975
19. Sati Savitri in 1978 (director)
20. Maavari Manchitanam in 1979 (director)
21. Mugana Sedu in 1980 (director)
22. Thayiya Madilalli in 1981 (director)
23. Thayi Mamathe in 1985 (director)
24. Yella Hengasirinda in 1986
25. Thavarumane Udugore in 1991
26. Mangalya in 1991

== See also ==
- Raghupathi Venkaiah Award
