= Varakatnam =

1969 film by N. T. Rama Rao

- Theatrical release poster
- Directed by: N. T. Rama Rao
- Story by: N. T. Rama Rao
- Produced by: N. Trivikrama Rao
- Starring: N. T. Rama Rao; Savitri; Krishna Kumari
- Cinematography: Ravikant Nagaich
- Edited by: G. D. Joshi
- Music by: T. V. Raju
- Production company: Ramakrishna & NAT Combines
- Release date: 10 January 1969
- Running time: 176 minutes
- Country: India
- Language: Telugu

Varakatnam (transl. Dowry) is a 1969 Indian Telugu-language drama film, produced by N. Trivikrama Rao under the banner Ramakrishna & NAT Combines and written and directed by his older brother N. T. Rama Rao. It stars Rama Rao, Savitri and Krishna Kumari, with music composed by T. V. Raju. The film won the National Film Award for Best Feature Film in Telugu.

== Cast ==
- N. T. Rama Rao as Deva Simha
- Savitri as Subhadra
- Krishna Kumari as Sujatha
- Nagabhushanam as Meesaala Venkaiah
- Relangi as Devaiah
- Padmanabham as Rangaiah
- Mikkilineni as Bhadraiah
- Rajanala as Mallanna Dora
- Satyanarayana as Balaramaiah
- M. Prabhakar Reddy as Subbaiah
- Allu Ramalingaiah as Achaiah
- Raavi Kondala Rao as Bhattu Murthy
- Perumallu as Sriramulu
- Suryakantham as Chukkamma
- Chandrakala as Lakshmi
- Hemalatha as Annapurna
- Brindavan Chowdary as Rama

== Production ==
=== Development ===
With an urge to play offbeat characters, N. T. Rama Rao converted his theatre troupe, National Art Theatre, into a film production company with his younger brother, N. Trivikrama Rao, as the producer and made Pichi Pullayya (1953), in which Rama Rao played a "have-not". He followed it with another film dealing with an unconventional subject, Todu Dongalu (1954). However, Rama Rao's intentions were not fruitful, forcing him to revert to the folklore genre with Jayasimha (1955) for commercial success. Subsequently, he made many successful films in the same genre. But his desire to make films dealing with contemporary issues remained. He then wrote a story based on dowry as a menace and himself directed the film, titled Varakatnam produced under his home banner, Ramakrishna & NAT Combines. Maddipatla Suri and Samudrala Ramanujacharya were hired to write the dialogues. Ravikant Nagaich was hired as cinematographer, and G. D. Doshi as editor.

=== Casting ===
Rama Rao, in addition to directing and writing the story, played the male lead Devasimha, while Krishna Kumari played the female lead Sujatha. The supporting cast of the main plot includes Nagabhushanam as Devasimha's father "Meesaala" Venkaiah, Savitri as Sujatha's sister-in-law Subhadra, Kaikala Satyanarayana as the short-tempered Balaramaiah and Mikkilineni as Balaramaiah's father Bhadraiah. The parallel plot features Suryakantham as the "sharp-tongued" Chukkamma, Relangi as her meek husband Devaiah, Padmanabham as their son Rangaiah and Chandrakala as the couple's daughter-in-law Lakshmi. Additionally, Rajanala Kaleswara Rao appears as Mallu Dora, a prospective bridegroom and Raavi Kondala Rao appears as Bhattumurthy, his assistant.

=== Filming ===
During Krishna Kumari's first day at shooting, a scene required her character Sujatha to cry before her mother's photo. Rama Rao narrated to her how Sujatha should act in the scene, before it and after. According to Krishna Kumari, Rama Rao "used to say that artistes should always be in the right mood while performing". He cancelled a day's shoot after finding Krishna Kumari out of mood. Varakatnam was the first instance that Rama Rao had gone to Tadepalligudem and Tanuku for location shooting. Several of his fans gathered up at the location to witness the shoot, and when the number increased, policemen had to interfere to control them. Amidst all this, Nagaich was tasked with shooting the film without showing anyone from the crowd of fans, and managed it successfully.

== Soundtrack ==
The soundtrack was composed by T. V. Raju. Songs like "Yenduki Tondara", "Maradala Maradala Tammuni Pellama" and "Yevaru Chesina Karma" attained popularity.

| No. | Title | Lyrics | Singer(s) | Length |
|---|---|---|---|---|
| 1. | "Endukee Tondara" | Kosaraju Raghavaiah | P. Susheela, Tilakam |
| 2. | "Idhena Mana Sampradayamidhena" (male) | C. Narayana Reddy | Ghantasala |
| 3. | "Illu Vakilirose Illalu (Tatvam)" | | Madhavapeddi Satyam |
| 4. | "Mallepoola Panditlona Chandamama" | Kosaraju | Pithapuram Nageswara Rao, K. Jamuna Rani |
| 5. | "Adugu Adugulo Madha Maraalamulu" | | P. Susheela, Ghantasala |
| 6. | "Gilakala Mancham Unde Chilakala Mandiri Unde" | Kosaraju | Pithapuram Nageswara Rao, K. Jamuna Rani |
| 7. | "Puttaloni Naganna Lechi Ravayya Swamy" | Kosaraju | P. Susheela, Jikki |
| 8. | "Sye Sye Jodedla Bandi" | Kosaraju | Madhavapeddi Satyam, Ghantasala |
| 9. | "Ennallaku Na Nomu Pandindhi" | C. Narayana Reddy | P. Susheela, Ghantasala |
| 10. | "Maradala Maradala Tammuni Pellama" | C. Narayana Reddy | P. Susheela, Jikki |
| 11. | "Dharasimhasanamai" | | Madhavapeddi Satyam |
| 12. | "Khagapathi Amrutamuthega" | | Madhavapeddi Satyam |
| 13. | "Evaru Chesina Kharma" | Kosaraju | Madhavapeddi Satyam |
| 14. | "Idhena Mana Sampradayamidhena" (female) | C. Narayana Reddy | P. Susheela |
| 15. | "Kattukunna Aali Gayyali Ainacho (Tatvam)" | | Madhavapeddi Satyam |

== Release and reception ==
Varakatnam was released on 10 January 1969. The film won the National Film Award for Best Feature Film in Telugu at the 16th National Film Awards, which felicitated films released in 1968.
