= Gulebakavali Katha =

1962 film by N. T. Rama Rao

- Theatrical release poster
- Directed by: N. T. Rama Rao
- Produced by: N. Trivikrama Rao
- Starring: N. T. Rama Rao; Jamuna; Nagarathna
- Cinematography: Ravikant Nagaich
- Edited by: S. P. S. Veerappa; G. Siva Murthy
- Music by: Joseph; Vijaya Krishna Murthy
- Production company: National Art Theaters
- Release date: 5 January 1962
- Running time: 170 minutes
- Country: India
- Language: Telugu

Gulebakavali Katha (transl. The story of Gulebakavali) is a 1962 Indian Telugu-language fantasy swashbuckler film directed by N. T. Rama Rao. The film was produced by N. Trivikrama Rao on National Art Theatres banner. It is based on the folk tale Gulebakavali from the folk tale collection Arabian Nights. Rama Rao also stars alongside Jamuna and Nagarathna. The film focuses on a man's quest to search for the Gulebakavali flower, which he needs to cure the king's blindness. It was released on 5 January 1962, and became a commercial success.

== Cast ==
Credits from The Hindu:

- N. T. Rama Rao as Vijaya
- Jamuna as Yuktimati
- Nagarathna as Bakavali
- Peketi Sivaram as one of Rupavathi's sons
- Mukkamala as Chandrasena
- Rajanala Kaleswara Rao as Vakraketu
- Lanka Satyam as the goatherd
- Mikkilineni as Mahendra
- K. V. S. Sharma as Dushtabudhi
- Padmanabham as one of Rupavathi's sons
- Balakrishna as Ati Telivi
- Rushyendramani as Gunavathi
- Hemalatha as the goatherd's wife
- Surabhi Balasarswathi as Adikaasa
- Chhaya Devi as Rupavathi

== Production ==
Gulebakavali Katha is the second Telugu film to be based on the folk tale Gulebakavali from the Arabian folk tale collection One Thousand and One Nights, following a 1938 film titled Gulebakavali. It was produced by N. Trivikrama Rao under National Art Theaters, and directed by N. T. Rama Rao. This was Rama Rao's second directorial venture after Sita Rama Kalyanam (1961); however, as with that film, he did not bill himself as director in the opening credits. The writer of the original story was not credited; instead, Trivikrama Rao was credited under "kathasekarana" (collecting the story). In addition to directing, Rama Rao starred as the male lead Vijaya. He cast two female leads: Jamuna as the trickster dice player Yuktimati; and actress G. Varalakshmi's niece Nagarathna as princess Bakavali, this being her acting debut. Nagarathna had only two dialogues, one of which was "Nanna". Ravikant Nagaich was hired as cinematographer, K. Narasimha Rao for art direction, and S. P. S. Veerappa and G. Siva Murthy for editing.

== Soundtrack ==
Music composers Joseph and Vijaya Krishna Murthy made their debut with this film, as did lyricist C. Narayana Reddy. The film's most popular songs were "Nannu Dhochukonduvate", "Kalala Alalapai", "Unnadi Chebuta" and "Madana Sundara Naa Doraa". The song "Nanna Dochukovante" is based on Abheri raga.

No.	Title	Singer(s)	Length
1.	"Unnadhi Chepputha Vintara"	S. Janaki, Vasantha	3:24
2.	"Amba Jagadamaba"	P. Leela	3:08
3.	"Kaaligajje Kadalakamunde"	S. Janaki	4:22
4.	"Anuraga Payonidhi"	Ghantasala	0:58
5.	"Salamalekum Sahebugaru"	Ghantasala, S. Janaki	3:01
6.	"Nannu Dhochukunduvate Vannela Dorasani"	Ghantasala, P. Susheela	3:22
7.	"Kalala Alalapai Telenu Manasu Malle Poovai"	Ghantasala, S. Janaki	4:35
8.	"Ontarinai Poyanu Ika Intiki Yemani Ponu"	Ghantasala	3:35
9.	"Madana Sundara Naa Dora"	P. Susheela	3:19
10.	"Vinnava Tatvam Guruda"	Pithapuram Nageswara Rao	1:51
11.	"Matha Jaganmatha"	Ghantasala	2:12

== Release and reception ==
Gulebakavali Katha was released on 5 January 1962. The film was commercially successful, and contributed to Rama Rao's streak of successful films.
