= Jayasimha (1955 film) =

- Theatrical release poster
- Directed by: D. Yoganand
- Written by: Samudrala Jr
- Produced by: N. Trivikrama Rao
- Starring: N. T. Rama Rao; Anjali Devi; S. V. Ranga Rao; Waheeda Rehman
- Cinematography: M. A. Rehman
- Edited by: G. D. Joshi
- Music by: T. V. Raju
- Production company: National Art Theater
- Release date: 21 October 1955
- Running time: 165 mins
- Country: India
- Language: Telugu

Jayasimha is a 1955 Indian Telugu-language swashbuckler film directed by D. Yoganand and written by Samudrala Jr. It was produced by N. T. Rama Rao and his brother N. Trivikrama Rao for their production company National Art Theatre. The film features Rama Rao playing the eponymous protagonist along with Anjali Devi and Waheeda Rehman (making her debut as an actress in Indian cinema) in the lead roles, supported by an ensemble cast of S. V. Ranga Rao, Kantha Rao, Gummadi, Relangi and Rajanala Kaleswara Rao.

Inspired from the Telugu novel Veera Pooja, (Note: Acharam Shanmukhachari of Sithara magazine credited Telugu writer and playwright Viswanatha Satyanarayana as the author of Veera Pooja, whereas M. L. Narasimham of The Hindu referred to a novel of the same name written by the Telugu poet duo Venkata Parvatiswara Kavulu.) the film tells the story of Jayasimha (played by Rama Rao), the crown prince of Malawa kingdom who escapes assassination attempts from his uncle Rudrasimha (Ranga Rao), who wishes to ascend the throne as the next king. Jayasimha leaves Malawa assuming a new identity and leads the life of a soldier in Magadha kingdom, falling in love with its princess Padmini (Waheeda) and befriending Kalindi (Anjali Devi), the daughter of an old disabled general Ranadheer (Gummadi). The rest of the film focuses on the aftermath of Rudrasimha finding out Jayasimha's new life in Magadha and seeking his life.

D. V. S. Raju, who assisted Rama Rao during the production of Pichi Pullayya (1953) and Thodu Dongalu (1954), joined the film's crew as an associate producer. T. V. Raju composed the film's soundtrack and score; M. A. Rehman was signed as the cinematographer and G. D. Joshi edited the film. Jayasimha's principal photography was conducted at sets erected by Thota at Vijaya Vauhini Studios, Madras (now Chennai).

Jayasimha was released theatrically on 21 October 1955, cashing in on the Vijayadasami festival holidays. Upon release, the film was a commercial success, completing a 100-day run in 6 centres, 169-day run in Vijayawada and Guntur, and a 175-day run in Bangalore. It was later dubbed into Tamil in the same year, with the title Jayasimman.

== Cast ==
- Anjali Devi as Kalindi
- N. T. Rama Rao as Jayasimha / Bhavani
- Waheeda Rehman as Padmini
- S. V. Ranga Rao as Rudrasimha
- Relangi as Budhimathi
- Gummadi as Ranadheer
- Kanta Rao as Vijayasimha
- Rajanala Kaleswara Rao as Mahaveer
- K. V. S. Sarma as Chandasena
- Dr. Kamaraju as Raghuveer
- Vangara Venkata Subbaiah as Prime Minister of Magadha kingdom
- Rushyendramani as Madhavi
- Valluri Balakrishna as a soldier in Magadha army
- Padmanabham as a soldier in Magadha army
- Kusalakumari dancer

== Production ==
After shooting the song, "Jaya Jaya Sri Rama", I removed the makeup and sat next to [Rama Rao]. Anjali Devi asked [him] "who is this boy?" [Rama Rao] had a hearty laugh and replied, "Till now he is the one who acted as your father." [sic] I can never forget the surprised expression on Anjali Devi’s face. As an actor it was the most memorable moment in my life.

— Gummadi, in his memoir Teepi Gurthulu

N. T. Rama Rao was depressed because of the commercial failure of his previous film Thodu Dongalu (1954), which he produced along with his brother N. Trivikrama Rao and Atluri Pundarikakshayya. The failure prompted Rama Rao to contemplate quitting film production, until Trivikrama Rao and Pundarikakshayya convinced him to try making a swashbuckler film rooted in folklore. The financial success of Pathala Bhairavi (1951), Chandirani (1953) and Rechukka (1954)—all starring Rama Rao in the lead role and set in the same genre—further influenced their decision. Most of the principal crew of Thodu Dongalu, including its director D. Yoganand and writer Samudrala Jr., were retained for this film. Rama Rao advised Samudrala Jr. to loosely adapt the novel Veera Pooja. However, the same was not acknowledged in the film's credits.

The film was titled Jayasimha and was produced for Rama Rao's production company National Art Theatre. While Rama Rao decided to play the eponymous protagonist, Anjali Devi and Waheeda Rehman were cast as the female leads Kalindi and Padmini respectively. Jayasimha was Waheeda's debut as an actress, after her cameo appearances in Kanyadanam (1954) and Rojulu Marayi (1955); she was trained by Pundarikakshayya himself and her lines were dubbed by Sowcar Janaki. For the role of Vijayasimha, Jayasimha's brother, the makers approached Akkineni Nageswara Rao who could not accept the offer because of scheduling conflicts. Jaggayya was considered, but Gummadi (who was cast as Ranadheer, Kalindi's father) recommended Kanta Rao for the role. Rama Rao agreed, and this was Kanta Rao's second collaboration with the former after Vaddante Dabbu (1954). S. V. Ranga Rao, Rajanala Kaleswara Rao and Relangi were cast in key supporting roles. Anjali Devi was given the top billing in the film's opening credits and the song books, and was succeeded by Rama Rao and Ranga Rao.

D. V. S. Raju, who assisted Rama Rao during the production of Pichi Pullayya (1953) and Thodu Dongalu, joined the film's crew as an associate producer. M. A. Rehman was signed as the cinematographer and G. D. Joshi edited the film. Jayasimha was shot in sets erected by Thota at Vijaya Vauhini Studios, Madras (now Chennai). Principal photography commenced on 19 January 1955 with a sequence filmed on Rama Rao and Relangi at Vauhini Studios, Madras. 'Stunt' Somu choreographed the action sequences. Kuchala Kumari and Rita composed the choreography for the dance sequences. The post-production activities were carried out at Vijaya Laboratories in Madras.

== Music ==
Jayasimha

Soundtrack album by T. V. Raju
- Released: 31 December 1955
- Recorded: 1955
- Studio: Vijaya Vauhini Studios
- Genre: Soundtrack
- Length: 36:44
- Label: His Master's Voice
- Producer: T. V. Raju

T. V. Raju chronology
Nirupedalu (1954)	Jayasimha (1955)	Chintamani (1956)

T. V. Raju composed the film's soundtrack and score, with lyrics written by Samudrala Jr., which was marketed by His Master's Voice. Satyam, who was known as 'Dholak' Satyam back then, assisted Raju during the composition of the songs. A. Krishnan was the film's audiographer, assisted by A. R. Swaminathan, C. Radhababu and V. Govinda Rao. On Satyam's advice, Raju decided to look for inspiration in Hindustani classical music. For the song "Eenati Eehayi", Raju took inspiration from Ghulam Mohammed's composition "Zindagi Denewale Sun" for Dil-E-Nadaan (1953). Similarly, for the pallavi of the song "Manasaina Cheli Pilupu", Raju used the tune of "Chori Chori Aag Se" composed by Shyam Sundar for Dholak (1951). Raju deviated from the tune of the originals, however, while composing the charanam for these songs. Another song "Are Nee Sagamapa" was adapted from a Hindi language composition of the same name written by Alla Rakha for Sabak (1950).

The song "Nadireyi Gadichene", filmed on Waheeda, was composed as a javali using the Begada raga. (Note: Javali is a poem set to music in Carnatic compositions which is usually romantic and more explicit in nature.) The duet "Madiloni Madhurabhavam", filmed on Rama Rao and Waheeda, was composed using the Mohanam raga. Raju composed the song "Nadiyeti Painadachu" in a Burra katha format which was well received by the critics. The soundtrack, consisting of 12 songs, was released on 31 December 1955 and received positive reviews. The song "Jaya Jaya Sri Rama" particularly gained popularity during the film's release and was played regularly in temples dedicated to Rama in Andhra Pradesh.

All lyrics are written by Samudrala Jr..

Tracklist
No.	Title	Singer(s)	Length
1.	"Nela Nadimi Vennela"	Jikki	02:01
2.	"Jeevitamintele"	M. S. Ramarao	02:49
3.	"Are Nee Sagamapa"	Pithapuram Nageswara Rao	02:57
4.	"Jaya Jaya Sri Rama"	Ghantasala	03:37
5.	"Muripemumeera"	A. P. Komala	02:42
6.	"Eenati Eehayi"	Ghantasala, P. Leela	03:57
7.	"Manasaina Cheli Pilupu"	R. Balasaraswathi Devi, A. P. Komala	03:00
8.	"Nadiyeti Painadachu"	Pithapuram Nageswara Rao	01:30
9.	"Madiloni Madhurabhavam"	Ghantasala, R. Balasaraswathi Devi	02:54
10.	"Metipai Velugaripoye"	Ghantasala	01:32
11.	"Tandana Hoyi (poem)"	Ghantasala	01:32
12.	"Nadireyi Gadichene"	P. Susheela	03:45
13.	"Kondameeda"	K. Rani	03:58
Total length:			36:44

== Release and reception ==
Jayasimha was released theatrically on 21 October 1955, cashing in on the Vijayadashami festival holidays. National Art Theatre released the film on their own across Andhra Pradesh, while the distribution rights for Nizam, Ceeded and Mysore regions were acquired by All India Talkie Distributors. (Note: For film trade purpose, the Nizam region includes the three districts of Kalaburagi, Bidar, and Raichur in Karnataka and seven districts in the Marathwada region including Aurangabad, Latur, Nanded, Parbhani, Beed, Jalna and Osmanabad apart from the state of Telangana. Similarly, the Ceeded region includes the Rayalaseema region of Andhra Pradesh and parts of Davanagere of Karnataka.) Upon release, the film was a commercial success, completing a 100-day run in 6 centres, 169-day run in Vijayawada and Guntur, and a 175-day run in Bangalore. Jayasimha was later dubbed into Tamil the same year with the title Jayasimman.
