= National Film Award for Best Telugu Feature Film =

Indian film award

- National award for contributions to Indian Cinema
- Awarded for: Best Telugu feature film of the year
- Sponsored by: National Film Development Corporation of India
- Formerly called: President's Silver Medal for Best Feature Film in Telugu (1954–1968); National Film Award for Best Feature Film in Telugu (1969–2021)
- Rewards: Rajat Kamal (Silver Lotus); ₹2,00,000
- First award: 1955
- Most recent winner: Committee Kurrollu (2024)

The National Film Award for Best Telugu Feature Film is one of the National Film Awards presented annually by the National Film Development Corporation of India. It is one of several awards presented for feature films and awarded with Rajat Kamal (Silver Lotus).

The National Film Awards, established in 1954, are the most prominent film awards in India that merit the best of the Indian cinema. The ceremony also presents awards for films in various regional languages.

Awards for films in seven regional language (Bengali, Hindi, Kannada, Malayalam, Marathi, Tamil and Telugu) started from 2nd National Film Awards which were presented on 21 December 1955. Three awards of "President's Silver Medal for Best Feature Film", "Certificate of Merit for the Second Best Feature Film" and "Certificate of Merit for the Third Best Feature Film" were instituted. The latter two certificate awards were discontinued from 15th National Film Awards (1967). Since the 70th National Film Awards, the name was changed to "Best Telugu Feature Film".

The 1954 film, directed by K. V. Reddy, Peddamanushulu was honoured with the first president's silver medal for Best Feature Film in Telugu. Certificate of Merit for Second and Third Best Feature Films in Telugu were received by Thodu Dongalu and Vipra Narayana respectively.

== Winners ==
Award includes 'Rajat Kamal' (Silver Lotus Award) and cash prize. Following are the award winners over the years:

Awards legends
*	President's Silver Medal for Best Feature Film
*	Certificate of Merit for the Second Best Feature Film
*	Certificate of Merit for the Third Best Feature Film
*	Certificate of Merit for the Best Feature Film

List of award films, showing the year (award ceremony), producer(s) and director(s)
Year	Film(s)	Producer(s)	Director(s)	Refs.
1954 (2nd)	Pedda Manushulu	Vauhini Productions	K. V. Reddy	
1954 (2nd)	Thodu Dongalu	National Art Theater, Madras	D. Yoganand	
1954 (2nd)	Vipra Narayana	Bharani Pictures	P. S. Ramakrishna Rao	
1955 (3rd)	Bangaru Papa	Vauhini Productions	B. N. Reddy	
1955 (3rd)	Ardhangi	Ragini Films	P. Pullayya	
1956 (4th)	Tenali Ramakrishna	Vikram Productions	B. S. Ranga	
1956 (4th)	Edi Nijam	Pratibha Productions	S. Balachander	
1957 (5th)	Bhagya Rekha	Ponnaluri Brothers	B. N. Reddy	
1957 (5th)	Thodi Kodallu	Annapurna Pictures	Adurthi Subba Rao	
1958 (6th)	Pelli Naati Pramanalu	Jayanthi Pictures	K. V. Reddy	
1958 (6th)	Mangalya Balam	Annapurna Pictures	Adurthi Subba Rao	
1959 (7th)	Nammina Bantu	Sambhu Films	Adurthi Subba Rao	
1959 (7th)	Maa Inti Mahalakshmi	Navashakthi Films	Gutha Ramineedu	
1959 (7th)	Jayabheri	Vasireddy Narayana Rao	P. Pullayya	
1960 (8th)	Mahakavi Kalidasu	Sarani Productions	K. Kameswara Rao	
1960 (8th)	Seetharama Kalyanam	National Art Theater, Madras	N. T. Rama Rao	
1961 (9th)	Bharya Bharthalu	Prasad Art Pictures	K. Pratyagatma	
1962 (10th)	Mahamantri Timmarusu	Gowthami Productions	K. Kameswara Rao	
1962 (10th)	Kula Gothralu	A. Subba Rao	Kotayya Pratyagatma	
1962 (10th)	Siri Sampadalu	V. Venkateswarlu	P. Pullayya	
1963 (11th)	Lava Kusa	Lalita Sivajyoti Films	C. Pullayya and C. S. Rao	
1963 (11th)	Amara Silpi Jakkanna	B. S. Ranga	B. S. Ranga	
1963 (11th)	Mooga Manasulu	C. Sundaram	Adurthi Subba Rao	
1964 (12th)	Doctor Chakravarthy	D. Madhusudhana Rao	Adurthi Subba Rao	
1964 (12th)	Ramadasu	Chittoor Nagayya	Chittoor Nagayya	
1965 (13th)	Antastulu	V. B. Rajendra Prasad	V. Madhusudhana Rao	
1965 (13th)	Palnati Yudham	Y. Lakshmaya Choudaray	Gutha Ramineedu	
1965 (13th)	Manushulu Mamathalu	A. Subba Rao	K. Atma	
1966 (14th)	Rangula Ratnam	B. N. Reddy	B. N. Reddy	
1967 (15th)	Sudigundalu	Chakravarthi Chitra	Adurthi Subba Rao	
1968 (16th)	Varakatnam	N. Trivikrama Rao	N. T. Rama Rao	
1969 (17th)	Aadarsa Kutumbam	N. Trivikrama Rao	K. Pratyagatma	
1970 (18th)	Desamante Manushuloyi	K. M. K. Naidu and G. K. Naidu	C. S. Rao	
1971 (19th)	Mattilo Manikyam	Chalam	B. V. Prasad	
1972 (20th)	Pandanti Kapuram	G. Hanumantha Rao	Lakshmi Deepak	
1973 (21st)	No Award			
1974 (22nd)	No Award			
1975 (23rd)	Mutyala Muggu	M. V. L. Narasimha Rao	Bapu	
1976 (24th)	Oorummadi Brathukulu	B. S. Narayana	B. S. Narayana	
1977 (25th)	Oka Oori Katha	A. Parandhama Reddy	Mrinal Sen	
1978 (26th)	Nimajjanam	Red Rose Art Films	B. S. Narayana	
1979 (27th)	Nagna Sathyam	U. Visweswar Rao	U. Visweswar Rao	
1980 (28th)	Harischandrudu	U. D. Murali Krishna	U. Visweswar Rao	
1981 (29th)	Seethakoka Chilaka	Edida Nageswara Rao	Bharathiraja	
1982 (30th)	Meghasandesam	Dasari Narayana Rao	Dasari Narayana Rao	
1983 (31st)	Rangula Kala	K. Venkateswara Rao	B. Narsing Rao	
1984 (32nd)	Sitaara	Edida Nageswara Rao	Vamsy	
1985 (33rd)	Sravanthi	Jaya Krishna	Kranthi Kumar	
1986 (34th)	Swathi Muthyam	Edida Nageswara Rao	K. Viswanath	
1987 (35th)	No Award			
1988 (36th)	Daasi	B. Ramachandra Rao	B. Narsing Rao	
1989 (37th)	Suthradharulu	Sudhakar Reddy and C. Karunakar Rao	K. Viswanath	
1990 (38th)	Matti Manushulu	K. Mukherjee and Veda Kumar	B. Narsing Rao	
1991 (39th)	Bhadram Koduko	V. Ramachandra Rao	Akkineni Kutumba Rao	
1992 (40th)	Ankuram	K. V. Suresh Kumar	C. Umamaheswara Rao	
1993 (41st)	Mister Pellam	Gavara Partha Sarathi	Bapu	
1994 (42nd)	No Award			
1995 (43rd)	Stri	NFDC and Doordarshan	K. S. Sethumadhavan	
1996 (44th)	Ninne Pelladata	Nagarjuna	Krishna Vamsi	
1997 (45th)	Sindhooram	Krishna Vamsi	Krishna Vamsi	
1998 (46th)	Tholi Prema	G. V. G. Raju	A. Karunakaran	
1999 (47th)	Kalisundam Raa	Daggubati Suresh Babu	Udayasankar	
2000 (48th)	Nuvve Kavali	Ramoji Rao	K. Vijaya Bhaskar	
2001 (49th)	Show	Manjula Ghattamaneni	G. Neelakanta Reddy	
2002 (50th)	No Award			
2003 (51st)	Aithe	Gunnam Gangaraju	Chandra Sekhar Yeleti	
2004 (52nd)	Swarabhishekam	H. Gopalakrishna Murthy	K. Viswanath	
2005 (53rd)	Bommalata	R. K. Film Associates, Spirit Media and Gunnam Gangaraju	Prakash Kovelamudi	
2006 (54th)	Kamli	B. C. Hari Charana Prasad and P. V. Sukanya	K. N. T. Sastry	
2007 (55th)	No Award			
2008 (56th)	1940 Lo Oka Gramam	N. C. Narasimham	Narasimha Nandi	
2009 (57th)	No Award			
2010 (58th)	No Award			
2011 (59th)	No Award			
2012 (60th)	Eega	Sai Korrapati	S. S. Rajamouli	
2013 (61st)	Naa Bangaaru Talli	Sun Touch Productions	Rajesh Touchriver	
2014 (62nd)	Chandamama Kathalu	Working Dream Production	Praveen Sattaru	
2015 (63rd)	Kanche	Y. Rajeev Reddy	Krish Jagarlamudi	
2016 (64th)	Pelli Choopulu	Dharamapatha Creations	Tharun Bhascker	
2017 (65th)	Ghazi	Prasad V. Potluri and K. Anvesh Reddy	Sankalp Reddy	
2018 (66th)	Mahanati	Priyanka Dutt	Nag Ashwin	
2019 (67th)	Jersey	Suryadevara Naga Vamsi	Gowtam Tinnanuri	
2020 (68th)	Colour Photo	Sai Rajesh and Benny Muppaneni	Sandeep Raj	
2021 (69th)	Uppena	Naveen Yerneni and Y. Ravi Shankar	Buchi Babu Sana	
2022 (70th)	Karthikeya 2	Abhishek Agarwal and T. G. Viswa Prasad	Chandoo Mondeti	
2023 (71st)	Bhagavanth Kesari	Sahu Garapati and Harish Peddi	Anil Ravipudi	
2024 (72nd)	Committee Kurrollu	Niharika Konidela	Yedu Vamsi Gudavalli	
