= Nandamuri Kalyana Chakravarthy =

Indian film actor

Nandamuri Kalyan Chakravarthy
- Occupations: Film actor; Businessperson
- Years active: 1980s

Nandamuri Kalyana Chakravarthy is an Indian actor known for his roles in Telugu cinema during the 1980s. He appeared as both a lead and supporting actor in approximately 15 films. Notable among his works are Thalambralu (1986), Inti Donga (1987), and Lankeswarudu (1989).

== Early life ==
Nandamuri Kalyana Chakravarthy is the son of N. Trivikrama Rao, film producer and the younger brother of Telugu film doyen, N. T. Rama Rao. He is thus the cousin of actor Nandamuri Balakrishna. Trivikrama Rao co-produced several films with his elder brother, N. T. Rama Rao, which contributed to Kalyana Chakravarthy's early exposure to the film industry. Growing up in this environment, he developed a natural passion for cinema.

Kalyana Chakravarthy shared a close bond with his father, whose opinions he highly valued. He would always seek his father's approval before committing to any role or script. If his father approved of a script, Kalyan would agree to it.

== Career ==
Kalyana Chakravarthy made his acting debut in 1986 with Athagaaru Swagatham, directed by Kodi Ramakrishna. He gained recognition with this film and appeared in two more that same year, including Thalambralu, which was a success. His career continued with four more films in 1987, including Inti Donga, also directed by Kodi Ramakrishna. He later played a notable role in Lankeswarudu (1989), directed by Dasari Narayana Rao, which starred Chiranjeevi. Kalyana Chakravarthy's acting career ended with Kabir Das (2003), directed by Vijayachander.

During his acting career, Kalyana Chakravarthy followed his father's belief that being a hero required strong acting skills beyond dance and fight sequences. He worked in family-oriented films such as Akshintalu, Thalambralu, Inti Donga, Donga Kapuram, and Menamama, and later appeared in action films like Rowdy Babai and Rudra Roopam. He also portrayed Lord Rama in Kabir Das, adhering to strict disciplines in his role.

His departure from the film industry was due to personal tragedies. The passing of his younger brother, Harin Chakravarthy, in a road accident, deeply affected him. Additionally, his father, Trivikrama Rao, suffered injuries in the same accident. Unable to recover from these losses, Kalyana Chakravarthy left acting to care for his father and has remained in Chennai since then. After his father's death, he did not return to Hyderabad and focused on managing his real estate business.

== Personal life ==
Kalyana Chakravarthy's younger brother, Harin Chakravarthy, who also pursued acting, died in a road accident, deeply affecting their family, especially their father, Trivikrama Rao. His son, Prudhvi, also died in a road accident.

Kalyana Chakravarthy currently resides in Chennai and continues to work in real estate.

== Filmography ==
- Note: All films are in Telugu, unless otherwise noted.

Year	Film	Role	Notes	Ref.
1986	Athagaaru Swagatham			
1986	Thalambralu			
1986	Mama Kodalu Saval			
1987	Inti Donga			
1987	Akshintalu			
1987	Donga Kapuram			
1987	Marana Homam			
1987	Rudra Roopam			
1987	Lawyer Bharathi Devi			
1987	Athagaaru Zindabad			
1987	Rowdy Babai			
1988	Jeevana Ganga			
1988	Prema Kireetam			
1988	Menamama			
1988	Pelli Kodukulosthunnaru			
1989	Lankeswarudu	Kalyan		
1991	Agni Nakshatram			
1993	Peddinti Ammayi			
2003	Kabir Das			
2025	Champion	Raaji Reddy		
