= N. Trivikrama Rao =

Indian film producer

Nandamuri Trivikrama Rao
- Born: Nandamuri Trivikrama Rao; Andhra Pradesh, India
- Occupations: Producer; director; screenwriter
- Years active: 1925–1998
- Children: Kalyan Chakravarthy

N. Trivikrama Rao was an Indian film producer, director and screenwriter in Telugu cinema. He was the younger brother of N. T. Rama Rao and the co-owner of National Art Theatre, a production house under which he has co-produced 40 feature films alongside his brother. He has received four National Film Awards, three state Nandi Awards and two Filmfare Awards South. Kalyan Chakravarthy who appeared in around 15 films in 1980s was his son.

== Awards ==
National Film Awards

- 1954 - Certificate of Merit for Best Feature Film in Telugu (producer) for Thodu Dongalu
- 1960 - Certificate of Merit for Best Feature Film in Telugu, (producer) for Seetharama Kalyanam
- 1970 - National Film Award for Best Feature Film in Telugu (producer) for Varakatnam

Nandi Awards

- 1965 - Second Best Feature Film - Silver - Sri Krishna Pandaveeyam
- 1970 - Second Best Feature Film - Silver - Kodalu Diddina Kapuram
- 1971 - Second Best Feature Film - Silver - Sri Krishna Satya

== Selected filmography ==
Producer

- Pichi Pullayya (1953)
- Thodu Dongalu (1954)
- Jayasimha (1955)
- Seetharama Kalyanam (1961)
- Gulebakavali Katha (1962)
- Ummadi Kutumbam (1967)
- Varakatnam (1970)
- Sri Krishna Satya (1971)
