= Gummadi (actor) =

Indian actor (1927–2010)

- Born: Gummadi Venkateswara Rao; 9 July 1926; Ravikampadu, Madras Presidency, British India
- Died: 26 January 2010 (aged 83); Hyderabad, Andhra Pradesh, India
- Occupation: Actor
- Years active: 1950–2010
- Awards: Padma Shri; Rashtrapati Award

Gummadi Venkateswara Rao (born 9 July 1926 – 26 January 2010), known mononymously by his surname Gummadi, was an Indian actor and producer, who worked predominantly in Telugu cinema. Known as one of the finest supporting/character actors in Telugu cinema, Gummadi acted in around 500 feature films. He received critical recognition for his work in Thodu Dongalu (1954) and Mahamantri Timmarusu (1962), for which he received the Rashtrapati Award. Gummadi was an official member of the Indian delegation from South India to the Tashkent Film Festival in 1978 and 1982.

Gummadi served as a jury member thrice for the 28th, 33rd and 39th National Film Awards. He served twice on the state Nandi Awards Committee.

In 1977, he was awarded India's fourth-highest civilian honor, the Padma Shri, for his contribution to Indian cinema. He is widely known for his roles in films such as Mayabazar (1957), Maa Inti Mahalakshmi (1959), Kula Daivam (1960), Kula Gothralu (1962), Jyothi (1976), Nelavanka (1981), Maro Malupu (1982), Ekalavya (1982), Ee Charitra Ye Siraatho? (1982), Gaaju Bommalu (1983) and Pelli Pustakam (1991).

In 2008, he starred in Jagadguru Sree Kasinayana Charitra, which would be his last film.

== Early career ==
=== Characters played by him ===
- Balarama
- Bhishma
- Maharishi Bhrigu
- Chief Minister
- Dasharatha
- Diwan
- Durvasa
- Jamadagni
- Kabir
- Karna
- Kasinayana
- Nanda
- Parashurama
- Pothana
- Principal
- Timmarusu
- Vishwamitra
- Yudhishthira
- Zamindar

== Personal life ==
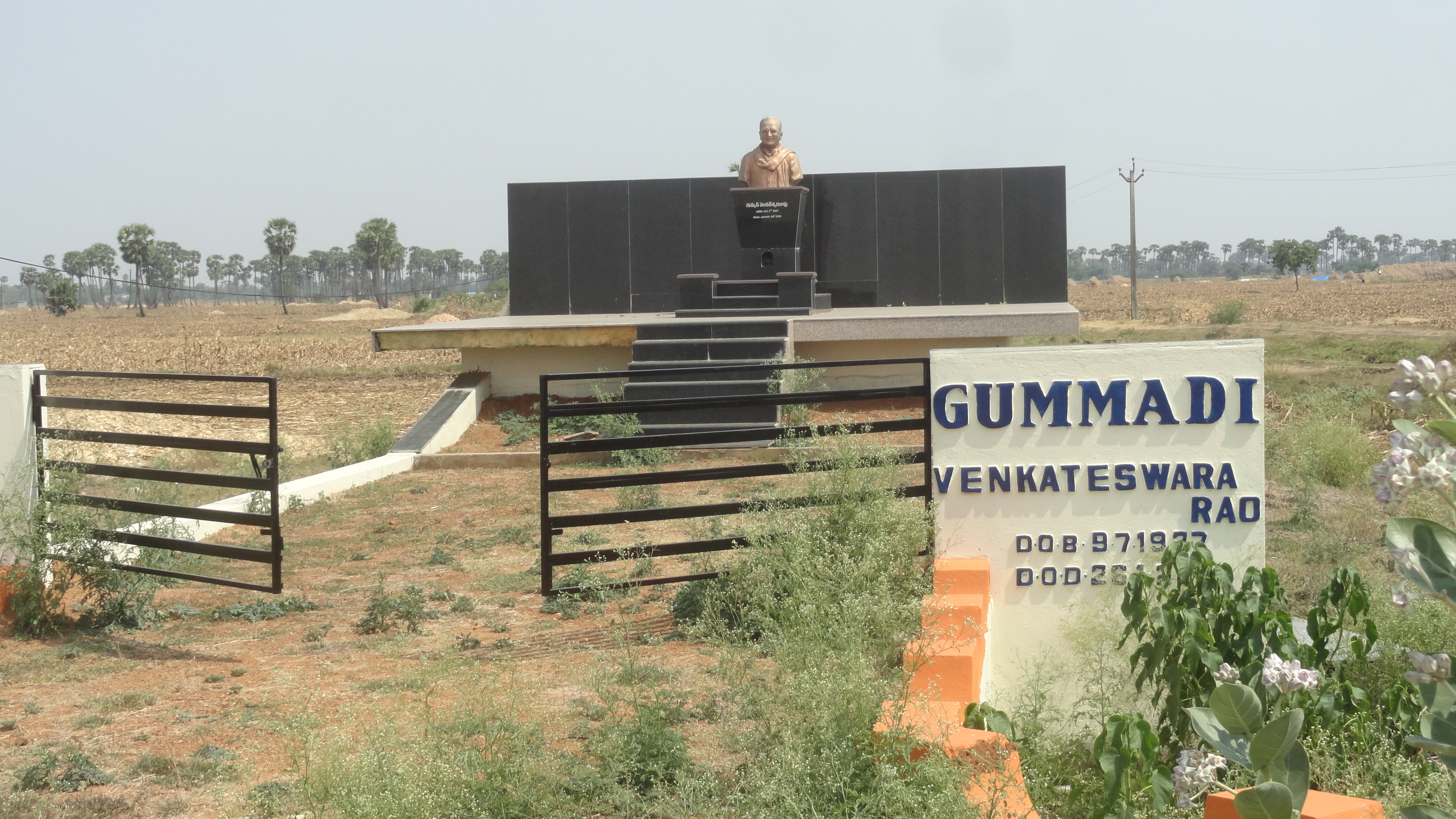
Gummadi Venkateswara Rao memorial near Potharlanka.

Gummadi was married and had five daughters and two sons. He died of multiple organ failure at Care hospital, Hyderabad on 26 January 2010. His last public appearance was at the screening of Maya Bazar, which had been colourised. Here he expressed his happiness and said, "Watching this great movie in colour probably could have been the only reason for me to have stayed alive for so long."

== Written works ==
Gummadi wrote his memoirs of Telugu cinema in Teepi Gurthulu and Chedu Gnapakalu.

== Awards ==
Civilian honors

- Padma Shri - Government of India - 1977

Rashtrapati Awards

- Best acting for Mahamantri Timmarusu (1963)

Nandi Awards

- Raghupathi Venkaiah Award for contribution to Telugu cinema (1998)
- Nandi Award for Best Supporting Actor - Maro Malupu (1982)

Other Honors

- 1963 - Honorary Doctorate - Potti Sreeramulu Telugu University
- 1976 - Filmfare Special Award for Excellent Performance - Jyothi

== Selected filmography ==
List of Gummadi film credits
Year	Title	Role	Notes
1950	Adrushta Deepudu		
1951	Navvite Navaratnalu		
1953	Pichi Pullayya	Bhopala Rao	
1954	Thodu Dongalu	Lokanatham	
1955	Kanyasulkam	Sowjanya Rao Pantulu	
1955	Ardhangi	Zameendaar	
1955	Jayasimha	Ranadhir	
1955	Missamma	Employer (guest role)	
1955	Rani Ratnaprabha	Dharmapala	
1956	Chiranjeevulu	Dr. Krishna	
1956	Edi Nijam	Munusabu	
1956	Ilavelpu	Sekhar's father	
1957	Suvarna Sundari	Tata	
1957	Manaalane Mangaiyin Baakkiyam	Tata	Tamil film; uncredited
1957	Maya Bazaar	Balarama	
1957	Dampatyam		
1957	Dongallo Dora	Inspector Ram Murthy	
1957	MLA	Damodaram	
1957	Premada Putri		Kannada film
1957	Preme Daivam		
1957	Sarangadhara		
1957	Sati Anasuya		
1957	Veera Kankanam		
1957	Vinayaka Chaviti	Satrajit	
1958	Aadapettanam		
1958	Chenchu Lakshmi	Durvasa	
1958	Dongalunnaru Jagratha		
1958	Ettuku Pai Ettu	Govindaiah	
1958	Intiguttu	Tirumala Rao	
1959	Illarikam	Zamindar	
1959	Jayabheri	Viswanatha Sastri	
1959	Krishna Leelalu	Vasudeva	
1959	Maa Inti Mahalakshmi		
1959	Nammina Bantu	Zamindar Bhujanga Rao	
1959	Pelli Sandadi		
1959	Raja Makutam	Prachandudu	
1959	Sabhash Ramudu		
1959	Sati Tulasi		
1959	Sipayi Kooturu		
1960	Deepavali	Nagadattudu	
1960	Harishchandra	Vishwamitra Maharshi	
1960	Pelli Kaanuka		
1960	Renukadevi Mahatyam		
1960	Sahasra Siracheda Apoorva Chintamani	Evil sorcerer	
1960	Shantinivasam		
1960	Sri Venkateswara Mahatyam	Bhrigu Maharshi	
1961	Bharya Bharthalu	Anand's father	
1961	Iddaru Mitrulu	Bhanoji Rao	
1961	Rishyashringar		
1961	Rushyashrunga		
1961	Santa		
1961	Sri Seetha Rama Kalyanam	Vishwamitra Maharshi	
1961	Tandrulu Kodukulu		
1961	Vagdanam	Ranganatham	
1961	Velugu Needalu		
1962	Aradhana	Principal	
1962	Bhishma	Karna	
1962	Constable Koothuru		
1962	Kalimilemulu		
1962	Khaidi Kannaiah		
1962	Kula Gothralu	Bhushaiah	
1962	Mahamantri Timmarusu	Mahamantri Timmarusu	
1962	Siri Sampadalu	Jagapati Naidu	
1963	Chaduvukunna Ammayilu	Venkat Rangayya	
1963	Irugu – Porugu		
1963	Lakshadhikari	Seetayya	
1963	Mooga Manasulu	Zamindar	
1963	Paruvu Prathishta		
1963	Punarjanma	Zamindar	
1963	Savati Koduku		
1963	Sri Krishnarjuna Yudham	Yudhishthira	
1963	Tirupathamma Katha		
1964	Aatmabalam	Psychiatrist	
1964	Aggimeedha Guggilam	as king	
1964	Dr. Chakravarthy	Inspector Sridhar	
1964	Manchi Manishi		
1964	Murali Krishna		
1964	Pooja Phalam	Diwan Ramakrishnaiah	
1964	Ramadasu	Kabir	
1964	Varasatwam		
1965	Pandava Vanavasam	Yudhishthira	
1965	Aatma Gowravam	Ramaiah	
1965	Antastulu	Zamindar	
1965	Chandrahasa		
1965	CID	Chalapathi	
1965	Keelu Bommalu		
1965	Naadi Aada Janme		
1965	Preminchi Choodu	Subbarayudu	
1965	Satya Harishchandra		
1965	Visala Hrudayalu	Viswanatham	
1966	Aastiparulu	Zamindar	
1966	Bhakta Potana	Pothana	
1966	Loguttu Perumallukeruka	Chidambaram	
1966	Kanne Manasulu		
1966	Navarathri	Radha's father	
1966	Palnati Yuddham		
1966	Shri Krishna Pandaviyam		
1967	Kambojaraju Katha		
1967	Poola Rangadu	Chalapathi	
1967	Prana Mithrulu	Diwan	
1967	Pattukunte Padivelu	Satyamurthy	
1967	Private Master	Sundari's father	
1967	Rahasyam	Sriganda Prabhu	
1968	Bandhipotu Dongalu	Doctor	
1968	Sudigundalu	Defence Lawyer	
1968	Bangaru Gaajulu	Chandra Shekaram	
1968	Bangaru Sankellu		
1968	Chuttarikalu		
1968	Govula Gopanna	Chairman Nagaraju	
1968	Mana Samsaram		
1968	Aggi Meeda Guggilam		
1968	Pala Manasulu		
1969	Sri Rama Katha	Makaradhwaja Maharaju	
1969	Adrushtavanthalu		
1969	Aadarsa Kutumbam		
1969	Aatmiyulu	Jagannadham	
1969	Bhale Abbayilu	Koteswara Rao	
1969	Bhale Rangadu		
1969	Jagath Kiladeelu	Commissioner Sinha	
1969	Buddhimanthudu	D.E.O	
1969	Manushulu Marali		
1969	Shri Rama Katha		
1969	Tara Sasankam		
1970	Agni Pareeksha		
1970	Akka Chellelu	Dharmayya	
1970	Jai Jawan	Madhava Rao	
1970	Jagath Jetteelu	S.P. Chandrashekhar	
1970	Amma Kosam	Raghurama Rao	
1970	Maro Prapancham		
1970	Sridevi		
1970	Kathanayika Molla		
1971	Amayakuralu		
1971	Bhagyavanthudu		
1971	Bharya Biddalu		
1971	Dasara Bullodu	Vasu	
1971	Mosagallaku Mosagadu	Daanala Dharmayya	
1971	Nenu Manishine		
1971	Prem Nagar	Lata's father	
1971	Sampoorna Ramayanam	Dasharadha	
1971	Shri Krishna Satya		
1971	Shrimanthudu		
1971	Sisindri Chittibabu		
1971	Suputhrudu		
1971	Vichithra Dampathyam		
1971	Pavitra Hrudayalu	Nagendra Babu	
1972	Bangaru Babu	Ranganatham	
1972	Bala Mitrula Katha	Kotaiah	
1972	Iddaru Ammayilu	Ramanujam	
1972	Kalavari Kutumbam	Madhava Rao	
1972	Manchi Rojulu Vachayi	Seethanna	
1972	Kalam Marindi		
1972	Koduku Kodalu	Srihari Rao	
1972	Neethi Nijayathi		
1972	Pandanti Kapuram		
1972	Tata Manavadu	Paramatma Rao	
1972	Vichitra Bandham	Ahobila Rao	
1972	Attanu Diddina Kodalu		
1973	Jeevana Tarangalu	Venugopal Rao	
1973	Kannavari Kala		
1973	Mallamma Katha		
1973	Marapurani Manishi	Ananda Rao	
1973	Minaru Babu		
1973	Samsaram Sagaram		
1973	Vichitra Vivaham		
1973	Vintha Katha		
1973	Meena	Hanumantha Rao	
1974	Alluri Seetharama Raju		
1974	Ammayi Pelli		
1974	Anaganaga Oka Thandri		
1974	Bhoomikosam		
1974	Devadasu		
1974	Dora Babu		
1974	Gali Patalu	Inspector Sekhar	
1974	Intinti Katha		
1974	Khaidi Babai		
1974	Manushullo Devudu	Father	
1975	Moguda Pellama	Dharma Rao	
1975	Babu		
1975	Samsaram		
1975	Saubhagyavati		
1975	Soggadu	Simhadri	
1975	Yashoda Krishna	Nanda	
1975	Zamindarugari Ammayi	Zamindar Srikrishna Rajendra Mahipathi	
1975	Lakshmana Rekha	Lawyer	
1976	Padi Pantalu	Seshayya	
1976	Ramarajyamlo Rakthapasam		
1976	Neram Nadi Kadu Akalidi		
1976	Manchiki Maro Peru		
1976	Oka Deepam Veligindhi		
1976	America Ammayi		
1976	Padavoyi Bharatheeyuda		
1976	Secretary		
1976	Sita Kalyanam	Dasaradh	
1976	Yavanam Katesindi		
1977	Aalu Magalu	Ranga Rao	
1977	Chakradhari		
1977	Eetharam Manishi	Vishwanatham	
1977	Janma janmala bandham		
1977	Daana Veera Soora Karna	Parasu Ramudu	
1977	Indradhanusu		
1977	Kalpana		
1977	Kurukshetram	Bhishma	
1977	Seetha Rama Vanavasam		
1977	Savasagallu		
1978	Indradhanussu	Rajasekharam	
1978	Chal Mohana Ranga		
1978	Sati Savitri		
1978	Chilipi Krishnudu		
1978	Akbar Saleem Anarkali		
1978	Devadasu Malli Puttadu	Sripathi Raja	
1978	Sahasavanthudu		
1978	Dudu Basavanna	Yadaiah	
1979	Captain Krishna		
1979	Ganga Bhavani		
1979	Intinti Ramayanam		
1979	Karthika Deepam		
1979	Khiladi Krishnudu		
1979	Mande Gundelu		
1979	Muddula Koduku	Raobahadoor Ranga Rao	
1979	Heema Hemeelu		
1979	Naa Illu Naa Vaalu		
1979	Shri Tirupati Venkateswara Kalyanam	Hathiram Bhavaji	
1980	Mosagadu		
1980	Bhola Shankarudu		
1980	Chandipriya		
1980	Buchi Babu	Buchi Babu's grandfather	
1980	Gharana Donga	Raghupathi, Devi's father	
1980	Gajadonga		
1980	Gopala Krishnudu		
1980	Kaksha		
1980	Sardar Papa Rayudu		
1980	Shri Vasavi Kannika Parameshwari Mahatyam		
1980	Sreevari Muchatlu		
1981	Agni Poolu	Rajeshwari's father	
1981	Alludugaru Zindabad	Raja Bhupathi Rao	
1981	Asha Jyoti		
1981	Bhoga Bhagyalu		
1981	Premabhishekam	Dr. Venkateswarulu	
1981	Kotha Jeevithalu		
1981	Prema Mandiram	Bhupati Raja	
1981	Sandhya Ragam		
1981	Jathagadu	Rangaiah	
1982	Bangaru Bhoomi	Dharma Rao	
1982	Mondighatam		
1982	Gruha Pravesam		
1982	Anuraga Devatha	Priest	
1982	Bangaru Kanuka		
1982	Ee Charitra Ae Siratho		
1982	Ekalavya		
1982	Jagannatha Rathachakralu		
1982	Kaliyuga Ramudu		
1982	Maro Malupu		Nandi Award for Best Actor
1982	Raga Deepam		
1982	Swayamvaram		
1983	Sangharshana		
1983	Idhi Kaadu Mugimpu	Defence Counsel	
1983	Prema Pichollu		
1983	Adavallu Aligithe		
1983	Ikanaina Marandi		
1983	Ee Pillaku Pellavuthundha		
1983	MLA Yedukondalu	Gopalakrishnaiah	
1983	Mundadugu	Lawyer	
1983	Nelavanka	Sitarama Raju	
1983	Pelli Choopulu		
1983	Police Venkataswamy		
1983	Rudrakali		
1983	Dharma Poratam	Justice Jagannath	
1984	Rustum	Brahmaiah Naidu	
1984	Bharatamlo Sankharavam		
1984	Rojulu Marayi		
1984	Devanthakudu	Bapineedu	
1984	Adigo Alladigo		
1984	Dandayatra		
1984	Kanchu Kagada	Rangaiah Panthulu	
1984	E Chaduvulu Makodu		
1985	Raktha Sindhuram	Jagannatham	
1985	Shri Datta Darshanam	Jamadagni	
1985	Bangaru Chilaka	Lawyer Madhava Rao	
1985	Kattula Kondayya		
1985	Jwala	IG	
1986	Driver Babu	Narayana Rao	
1986	Vikram	Commissioner	
1986	Muddula Manavarallu		
1986	Tandra Paparayudu		
1986	Challani Ramayya Chakkani Seethamma		
1986	Prathibhavanthudu		
1986	Kiraathakudu	Dharmateja	
1986	Vijrumbhana	Dharma Rao	
1987	Pasivadi Pranam		
1987	Thene Manasulu		
1987	Majnu	Alekhya's grandfather	
1987	Ajeyudu		
1987	Muddu Bidda		
1987	Makutamleni Maharaju	Sivaram Prasad	
1988	Marana Mrudangam		
1988	Anna Chellelu		
1989	State Rowdy		
1989	Krishna Gari Abbayi		
1989	Simha Swapnam		
1989	Rajakeeya Chadarangam		
1990	Mamasri	Sundara Ramaiah	
1990	Inspector Rudra		
1990	Bobbili Raja	Sundaraiah	
1991	Pelli Pustakam	Sridhar Rao	Nandi Award for Best Feature Film
1991	Bhargav		
1991	Brahmarshi Viswamitra	Vashista	
1991	Talli Tandrulu	Venkataramaiah	
1992	Brundavanam	Jagannadham	
1993	Muta Mesthri	Chief Minister	
1993	Gaayam		
1993	Major Chandrakanth		
1993	Naga Jyothi		
1993	Rajendrudu Gajendrudu	Elephant's Master	
1993	Rajeswari Kalyanam		
1993	Varasudu	Principal	
1993	Srinatha Kavi Sarvabhowmudu		
1994	Govinda Govinda	Doorvasa Maharshi	
1994	Neram		
1994	Subhalagnam	Lawyer	
1995	Maya Bazaar	Balarama	
1995	Aayanaki Iddaru	Krishna Mohan's father	
1996	Dharma Chakram		
2001	Repallelo Radha		
2008	Jagadguru Sri Kasinayana Charitra	Kasinayana	
2022	Pratibimbalu		Posthumous film

== See also ==
- Raghupathi Venkaiah Award
