= D. Yoganand =

South Indian film director

- Born: Dasari Yoganand; 16 April 1922; Madras, Madras Presidency, British India
- Died: 23 November 2006 (aged 84); Chennai, Tamil Nadu, India
- Occupation: Film director
- Spouse: Hanumayamma

Dasari Yoganand (16 April 1922 – 23 November 2006) was an Indian film director, who worked predominantly in Telugu and Tamil films.

== Early life ==
Yoganand was born in Madras, in British India. His parents were Venkata Das, an estate manager under Nawaab Raza Ali Khan of Machilipatnam, and Lakshmi Bai. He became a photographer. He was interested in playing and directing dramas and came close to Tungala Chalapathi Rao and Yadavalli Nageswara Rao in Machilipatnam. He went to Bangalore, trained in Radiology, and he went to Madras in 1939 to help his father. Yoganand joined Jiten Benarjee of Newtone Studios after his father's death and later worked with famous cinematographer M. A. Rehman.

He participated in the Quit India Movement of 1942. In the Indian Freedom Movement, he came close to Congress leaders like Rajagopalachari, Tanguturi Prakasam and Bulusu Sambamurthi.

== Film career ==
Yoganand worked as an associate to Gudavalli Ramabrahmam and L. V. Prasad. He worked in Samsaram directed by L.V. Prasad. In 1943, he joined Manikyam as an editor for the film Mayalokam and also worked as an assistant director to Gudavalli Ramabrahmam. He worked for Bhakta Tulasidas by Lanka Satyam in Salem for three years.

His debut film was Ammalakkalu (Telugu) and Marumagal (Tamil) by Leena Chettiar in 1953. He became the in-house filmmaker for his Krishna Pictures and made many box-office successes including the Madurai Veeran (1956) which sowed the seeds for M. G. Ramachandran to be projected as more than a mere good-looking hero.

After working with Yoganand, N. T. Rama Rao offered to let him direct Thodu Dongalu (1954). He also wrote the story for the film, which received many awards including a merit certificate from the President of India and an award in the China Film Festival. NTR gave him a second chance in his next film Jayasimha which became a blockbuster.

He directed about 50 films in Telugu and Tamil languages; among them N. T. Rama Rao had the lead role in 17 films. His films include Thodu Dongalu, Ilavelpu, Kodalu Diddina Kapuram, Ummadi Kutumbam, Muga Nomu, Jai Jawan, Vemulavada Bheema Kavi, Kathanayakuni Katha, Dabbuku Lokam Dasoham, Jayasimha, Vade Veedu, Thodu Dongalu, Thikka Shankarayya and Pelli Sandadi. He had the unique distinction of directing all the top stars, both in Telugu and Tamil film fields such as N. T. Rama Rao, Akkineni Nageswara Rao, Relangi, Bhanumathi Ramakrishna, Savitri, Padmini, Vyjayanthimala, Jayalalitha, Pandari Bai, B. Saroja Devi, Devika, Sivaji Ganesan, M. G. Ramachandran, Gemini Ganesan, S. S. Rajendran and M. N. Nambiar, K. Balaji.

He died of a heart attack in Chennai.

== Filmography ==
Year	Film	Language	Role
1945	Mayalokam	Telugu	Assistant editor
1953	Ammalakkalu	Telugu	Director
1953	Marumagal	Tamil	Director
1954	Todu Dongalu	Telugu	Director
1955	Jayasimha	Telugu	Director
1955	Kaveri	Tamil	Director
1955	Vijaya Gowri	Telugu	Director
1956	Ilavelpu	Telugu	Director
1956	Madurai Veeran	Tamil	Director
1956	Sri Gowri Mahatyam	Telugu	Director
1958	Anbu Enge	Tamil	Director
1958	Boologa Rambai	Tamil	Director
1958	Bhooloka Rambha	Telugu	Director
1959	Kalyana Penn	Tamil	Director
1959	Pelli Sandadi	Telugu	Director
1959	Vachchina Kodalu Nachchindi	Telugu	Director
1960	Engal Selvi	Tamil	Director
1960	Kanna Kooturu	Telugu	Director
1960	Parthiban Kanavu	Tamil	Director
1962	Valar Pirai	Tamil	Director
1962	Raani Samyuktha	Tamil	Director
1963	Parisu	Tamil	Director
1964	Pasamum Nesamum	Tamil	Director
1967	Farz	Hindi	Assistant cameraman
1967	Ummadi Kutumbam	Telugu	Director
1968	Baghdad Gajadonga	Telugu	Director
1968	Tikka Sankarayya	Telugu	Director
1969	Mooga Nomu	Telugu	Director
1970	Jai Jawan	Telugu	Director
1970	Kodalu Diddina Kapuram	Telugu	Director
1971	Thangaikkaga	Tamil	Director
1972	Rani Yaar Kuzhanthai	Tamil	Director
1973	Dabbuku Lokam Dasoham	Telugu	Director
1973	Vaade Veedu	Telugu	Director
1974	Thaai	Tamil	Director
1974	Vemulawada Bheemakavi	Telugu	Director
1975	Ee Kalam Dampatulu	Telugu	Director
1975	Kathanayakuni Katha	Telugu	Director
1976	Gruhapravesam	Tamil	Director
1978	General Chakravarthi	Tamil	Director
1978	Justice Gopinath	Tamil	Director
1979	Naan Vazhavaippen	Tamil	Director
1980	Yamanukku Yaman	Tamil	Director
1982	Oorukku Oru Pillai	Tamil	Director
1982	Vaa Kanna Vaa	Tamil	Director
1983	Simham Navvindi	Telugu	Director
1983	Sumangali	Tamil	Director
1984	Sarithira Nayagan	Tamil	Director

== Awards ==
National Film Awards

- 1954: Certificate of Merit for Best Feature Film in Telugu - Thodu Dongalu
- 1960: President's Silver Medal for Best Feature Film in Tamil - Parthiban Kanavu

Other Awards

- His Ummadi Kutumbam (1967) film was selected for screening at Moscow Film Festival.
- Kalaimamani Award from Government of Tamil Nadu in 1981.
