= Thangaikkaaga =

- Poster
- Directed by: D. Yoganand
- Written by: V. C. Guhanathan (dialogues)
- Screenplay by: Azhagarasan
- Produced by: Mrs. Florida Fernando
- Starring: Sivaji Ganesan; Vennira Aadai Nirmala; Lakshmi; Muthuraman
- Cinematography: P. Bhaskar Rao
- Music by: M. S. Viswanathan
- Production company: Jupiter Art Movies
- Release date: 6 February 1971
- Country: India
- Language: Tamil

Thangaikkaaga (transl. For the sister's sake) is a 1971 Indian Tamil-language film directed by D. Yoganand. The film stars Sivaji Ganesan, Vennira Aadai Nirmala, and Lakshmi. It was released on 6 February 1971.

== Plot ==
Ramu and his sister Radha lead a normal life until Ramu's boss, Moorthy, falls in love with Radha. However, in a shocking turn of events, Radha goes missing and Moorthy is murdered, leaving Ramu tangled in a web of crime and desperation as he tries to uncover the truth and protect his sister.

== Cast ==
- Sivaji Ganesan as Ramu / Ravi
- Vennira Aadai Nirmala as Saratha
- Lakshmi as Radha / Amutha
- Muthuraman as Sekar
- M. N. Nambiar as Moorthy / Prakash
- S. V. Ramadas as Dass
- T. K. Bhagavathi as Paramasivam
- T. S. Balaiah as Jambulingam
- M. S. Sundari Bai as Arunthathi
- Nagesh as Panchatcharam / Cholapatti Chinna Jameendar
- Sachu as Selvam
- V. Nagayya as Samiyar
- Gandhimathi as Akilandam
- C. R. Parthiban as Head of Police Officer
- Typist Gopu as Panchatcharam Friend
- Master Prabhakar as Young Ramu
- Baby Sumathi as Young Radha

== Soundtrack ==
The music was composed by M. S. Viswanathan, with lyrics by Kannadasan. The song "Angamuthu" belongs to baila, a Sri Lankan music genre.

Song	Singers	Length
"Angamuthu"	A. L. Raghavan	04:26
"Azhage Nee Oru"	P. Susheela, L. R. Eswari	04:09
"Thaayin Mugam"	P. Susheela	03:24
"Unnaithedivarum"	T. M. Soundararajan, S. Janaki	04:24
"Vellikkizhamai"	L. R. Eswari, Saibaba	04:26
"Yedhaiyum Thanguven"	T. M. Soundararajan	04:25
