= Pelli Sandadi (1959 film) =

- Theatrical release poster
- Directed by: D. Yoganand
- Written by: D. Yoganand; Sitaram (dialogues)
- Screenplay by: D. Yoganand
- Story by: Samudrala Jr
- Produced by: Sitaram
- Starring: Akkineni Nageswara Rao; Anjali Devi; B. Saroja Devi
- Cinematography: B. S. Jagirdhar
- Edited by: D. Yoganand, Sitaram
- Music by: Ghantasala
- Production company: Republic Productions
- Distributed by: Chamriya Film Distributors
- Release date: 2 April 1959
- Running time: 137 minutes
- Country: India
- Language: Telugu

Pelli Sandadi (transl. Wedding Euphoria) is a 1959 Indian Telugu-language comedy film, produced by Sitaram under the Republic Productions banner and directed by D. Yoganand. It stars Akkineni Nageswara Rao, Anjali Devi and B. Saroja Devi, with music composed by Ghantasala.

== Plot ==
The film begins in Vimalapuram, where Captain Kota lives merrily with his two daughters, Anuradha & Priyamvada, and his younger Janardhan / Dhan. Once, he organized a dance program for his daughters in the nearby town using the phony identity Angla-Pingla. Whereat, Gurunatham, the son of Rao Bahadur Gangadharam, falls for Priyamwada and tails her, but she absconds. Later, Subedar Anjaneyulu, a mutual friend of Rao Bahadur & Kota, fixes a convergence between Gurunatham and Kota's daughters for the match. Unbeknownst to Gurunatham, he transposes himself with his friend Vasu and falls for Anuradha. Accidentally, Vasu is stuck therein, which throws Gurunatham in trouble, and Uma, the daughter of Anjaneyulu, aids him.

Meanwhile, Rao Bahadur proceeds to Vimalapuram when Gurunatham telegrams Vasu and returns home. Knowing it, Vasu plans an escape when Anuradha hides him. Soon after Rao Bahadur's departure, he reappears in Kota's residence. At his post-arrival, Raobahadoor receives a telegram from Dhan briefing his son's presence. Since bewildered, he backs; Gurunatham also rushes behind until Vasu quits. Thus, Rao Bahadur contends with Kota regarding Gurunatham and exits. In tandem, Gurunatham silently walks into Kota's bungalow and reveals his identity when they lock him, feeling fishy. Hence, Dhan lands at Anjaneyulu's residence to sort out the mystery of where he crushes with Uma. Eventually, Priyamvada starts liking seized Gurunatham.

Besides, as Willies, Kota is extorted by a drunkard, Veeraiah. Priyamvada notices it and is aware that Anuradha is not her sibling. She is the daughter of Kota's sister, who knitted a rogue Veeraiah and died after delivery due to his torments. Simultaneously, Anuradha discovers Priya's friendship with Gurunatham and smacks her when she mortifies her divulging her birth secret. Parallelly, in an anecdote, Vasu is the son of a Zamindar living in exile as per their family heritage. Currently, Zamindar & Rao Bahadur advertise in newspapers to know the whereabouts of Vasu & Gurunatham. Dhan notices it and informs the two. In the interim, distressed Anuradha steps out to commit suicide. After a lot of confusion, everyone joined. Finally, the movie ends happily with the marriage of turtle doves.

== Cast ==
- Akkineni Nageswara Rao as Vasu / Mr. Nath
- Anjali Devi as Anuradha
- B. Saroja Devi as Priyamvada
- Chalam as Gurunatham
- Gummadi as Captain Kota
- Ramana Reddy as Janardhan
- C.S.R. as Raobahadoor Gangadharam
- Hemalatha as Gangadharam's wife
- Surabhi Balasaraswati as Uma
- Rajanala as Kaali Paata Zamindar
- R. Nageswara Rao as Veeraiah
- Kanta Rao as Doctor
- Dr. Sivaramakrishnaiah as Anjaneyulu
- Chadalavada as Editor
- Peketi Sivaram as Prof. Royya

== Soundtrack ==
Music composed by Ghantasala. Lyrics were written by Samudrala Jr.

| S. No. | Song title | Singers | length |
|---|---|---|---|
| 1 | "Appatiki Ippatiki" | P. Leela | 3:00 |
| 2 | "Bito Bito Pellikodaka" | Raghavulu, Jikki | 2:22 |
| 3 | "Chamak Chamak" | Ghantasala, P. Leela | 3:14 |
| 4 | "Hailelo Naa Raaja" | P. Leela, Jikki | 10:29 |
| 5 | "Jalle Bomabayi Le" | Ghantasala, P. Leela, Jikki | 4:12 |
| 6 | "Nallani Vade" | P. Leela, K. Rani | 3:14 |
| 7 | "Rave Naa Premalatha" | Ghantasala, R. Balasaraswathi Devi | 4:38 |
| 8 | "Samayamidi Dayera Sarasuda" | P. Leela, Jikki | 6.02 |
| 9 | "Raavoyi Sakkanoda Naa Thoda" | P. Leela, Jikki | 6.02 |
