= Talambralu =

1986 Telugu film by Kodi Ramakrishna

- Directed by: Kodi Ramakrishna
- Written by: Ganesh Patro (dialogues)
- Screenplay by: Kodi Ramakrishna
- Story by: M. S. Art Movies Unit
- Produced by: Shyam Prasad Reddy
- Starring: Rajasekhar; Jeevitha; Nandamuri Kalyan Chakravarthy
- Cinematography: P. Laxman
- Music by: Satyam
- Production company: M. S. Art Movies
- Release date: 17 October 1986
- Country: India
- Language: Telugu

Talambralu is a 1986 Indian Telugu-language film directed by Kodi Ramakrishna. The film stars Rajasekhar, Jeevitha, and Nandamuri Kalyan Chakravarthy in the lead roles. It was produced by Shyam Prasad Reddy under the banner of M. S. Art Movies. The music for the film was composed by Satyam. The film was a commercial success. Rajasekhar's portrayal in the film was well received by audiences. He won the Nandi Award for Best Villain for his performance.

== Cast ==
- Rajasekhar
- Jeevitha
- Kalyan Chakravarthy
- Sharif
- Radhakrishna
- Prasad
- Prabhakar
- Subba Rao
- Uma
- Manju
- Nagalakshmi

== Production ==
Rajasekhar shared that he was initially hesitant to take on the role in Talambralu. However, after listening to the story at the insistence of producer Shyam Prasad Reddy, he became intrigued and decided to take the role. He noted that the film's unique aspect was that the antagonist was also the protagonist. Rajasekhar mentioned that during the shooting, his co-star Jeevitha could deliver long dialogues in a single take, while he needed multiple attempts, which left him feeling frustrated and envious. He humorously recalled waiting for a moment when Jeevitha might require a second take, but it never happened.

During the production of Talambralu, Jeevitha jokingly called Rajasekhar a "fraud" on set, referencing his character's deceitful actions in the film. Their love blossomed during this time, as they spent most of their time together at Padmalaya Studios, ultimately leading to their marriage.

Jeevitha's sister, Uma, also made her acting debut in Talambralu in a key role. Despite having no prior acting experience, Uma was persuaded by producer Shyam Prasad Reddy to take on the role. She initially faced difficulties on set, leading to delays and the need for additional training. After the film's release, Uma gained significant recognition, often being compared favourably to Jeevitha. Despite this initial success, Uma's acting career did not sustain due to various challenges, and she eventually left the industry to pursue a different path.

== Music ==
All music is composed by Satyam.

Track list
No.	Title	Lyrics	Singer(s)	Length
1.	"Idi Pata Kane Kadu"	Rajasri	P. Susheela
2.	"Ninna Neevu Nakento Dooram"	Mallemala	S. P. Balasubrahmanyam, P. Susheela
3.	"O Danavudaina Manavuda"	Mallemala	P. Susheela
4.	"O Ratri Nuvvu Vellipo"	Mallemala	P. Susheela

== Reception ==
The film was released on 16 October 1986 and became a commercial success. It was praised for its script, music, and Rajasekhar's performance in a negative role, which was well received by audiences.

== Awards ==
- Nandi Award for Best Villain - Rajasekhar

== Legacy ==
Although Rajasekhar initially thought Jeevitha would get more recognition for her role, he was surprised when he received significant praise for his performance. He also shared an amusing incident where a fan kissed him in the theatre, showing the film's impact. After the success of Talambralu, Rajasekhar went on to star in other hits like Aahuthi (1987) and Ankusam (1989), and eventually married Jeevitha.
