= Kodalu Diddina Kapuram =

- Theatrical release poster
- Directed by: D. Yoganand
- Screenplay by: N. T. Rama Rao
- Story by: N. T. Rama Rao
- Produced by: N. Trivikrama Rao
- Starring: N. T. Rama Rao; Savithri; Vanisri
- Cinematography: J. Satyanarayana
- Edited by: G.D.Joshi
- Music by: T. V. Raju
- Production companies: NAT & Ramakrishna Cine Studios
- Release date: 21 October 1970
- Running time: 193 minutes
- Country: India
- Language: Telugu

Kodalu Diddina Kapuram (transl. 'Family reformed by the daughter-in-law') is a 1970 Indian Telugu-language drama film directed by D. Yoganand and written by N. T. Rama Rao. Produced by N. Trivikrama Rao, the film stars N. T. Rama Rao, Savitri, and Vanisri, with music composed by T. V. Raju. The film, which marked the 200th film of N. T. Rama Rao’s career, was a commercial success, running for over 175 days in theatres.

== Plot ==
The film revolves around Rao Bahadur, a multimillionaire who faces turmoil in his later years due to his dysfunctional family. His wife, Kanthamma, is a naive and superstitious woman, whose gullibility allows a scheming Sachidananda to infiltrate their home and exploit their wealth. Rao Bahadur has two sons, Ramu and Ranga, and a daughter, Sobha. Ramu is married to the virtuous Lakshmi, but he despises her traditional values and is infatuated with a dancer, Maala. Ranga, though good-natured, becomes an alcoholic due to a lack of familial affection. Sobha, a modern and headstrong woman, dominates her submissive husband, Sankaram. The family’s disarray even leads to the dismissal of most servants, leaving only the loyal Musalayya in their service.

When Lakshmi moves into the household, Ramu seeks a divorce, which she agrees to, though they are legally required to live together for a period of time. During this time, Lakshmi begins to transform the family dynamics. She fosters a bond with Ranga, who reforms under her nurturing care. Together, they work to restore order to the household, exposing corrupt servants and convincing Sobha to return to her in-laws.

Meanwhile, Musalayya's courageous niece, Parvathi, joins the household as a helper. Ranga develops feelings for her and takes on various disguises to expose Maala's manipulative nature, ultimately helping Ramu recognize Lakshmi's virtues. Despite Lakshmi signing the divorce papers and leaving with the intent to end her life, Ranga uncovers Sachidananda's treachery and has him arrested. He also saves Lakshmi, bringing her back to the family.

The film concludes on a positive note, with Ramu reconciling with Lakshmi and Ranga marrying Parvati.

== Cast ==
- N. T. Rama Rao as Ranga
- Savitri as Lakshmi
- Vanisri as Parvathi
- Jaggayya as Ramu
- Satyanarayana as Swamiji Sachidananda
- Nagabhushanam as Rao Bahadur
- Relangi as Cook Siddi
- Ramana Reddy as Sankaram's father
- V. Nagayya as Lawyer
- Dr. Sivaramakrishnayya as Watchman
- Padmanabham as Sankaram
- K. V. Chalam as Cook
- Raavi Kondala Rao as Cook
- Tyagaraju as Musulayya
- Sarathi as Sathu
- Suryakantham as Rao Bahadoor's wife
- Santha Kumari as Kanthamma
- Vijayalalitha as Mala
- Sandhya Rani as Sobha

== Music ==
Kodalu Diddina Kapuram

Film score by T. V. Raju
- Released: 1970
- Genre: Soundtrack
- Length: 33:21
- Producer: T. V. Raju

Music was composed by T. V. Raju.

S. No.	Song title	Lyrics	Singers	length
1	"Nee Dharmam Nee Sangham"	C. Narayana Reddy	P. Susheela	3:18
2	"Chuoodara Nanna Ee Lokam"	Kosaraju	Ghantasala	5:27
3	"Choodave Choodu"	C. Narayana Reddy	P. Susheela	3:32
4	"Niddurapora Saami"	C. Narayana Reddy	S. P. Balasubrahmanyam, S. Janaki	3:03
5	"Antha Thelisi Vachchane"	C. Narayana Reddy	Ghantasala, S. Janaki	3:36
6	"Emmogudivi Nuvvemmogudivi"	Kosaraju	S. P. Balasubrahmanyam, L. R. Eswari	3:26
7	"Vanta Inti Prabhuvulam"	Kosaraju	S. P. Balasubrahmanyam, Raghavan	3:06
8	"Clubbante"	Kosaraju	Ghantasala	3:29
9	"Om Satchidananda"	Kosaraju	Madhavapeddi Satyam, Pithapuram	4:24

== Reception ==
The film celebrated a Silver Jubilee function and ran more than 175 days in Vijayawada.

== Awards ==
- Nandi Award for Second Best Feature Film - Silver - N. Trivikrama Rao (1970)
