= Champion (2025 film) =

2025 Indian Telugu film by Pradeep Advaitham

- Theatrical release poster
- Directed by: Pradeep Advaitham
- Written by: Pradeep Advaitham
- Produced by: Priyanka Dutt; G. K. Mohan; Gemini Kiran
- Starring: Roshan Meka; Anaswara Rajan; Nandamuri Kalyana Chakravarthy; Archana; Santhosh Prathap; Ranvir Shorey
- Cinematography: R. Madhi
- Edited by: Kotagiri Venkateswara Rao
- Music by: Mickey J. Meyer
- Production companies: Swapna Cinema; Anandi Art Creations; Zee Studios
- Release date: 25 December 2025
- Running time: 166 minutes
- Country: India
- Language: Telugu
- Budget: ₹45 crore
- Box office: ₹11 crore

Champion is a 2025 Indian Telugu-language Periodic Social Action Drama film written and directed by Pradeep Advaitham, and produced by Priyanka Dutt, G. K. Mohan, and Gemini Kiran under Swapna Cinema in association with Anandi Art Creations and Zee Studios. It features Roshan Meka, Anaswara Rajan (in her Telugu debut), Nandamuri Kalyana Chakravarthy, Archana, Ranvir Shorey and Santhosh Prathap in important roles.

The film's music is composed by Mickey J. Meyer, cinematography is by R. Madhi, and editing by Kotagiri Venkateswara Rao. The film is theatrically released on 25 December 2025. The film received mixed reviews from critics and was a commercial failure at box office.

== Plot ==
The film centers on Michael Williams, a talented footballer from Secunderabad aiming to play in London, set against the backdrop of the 1947 Indian independence struggle and the Bhairanpally revolt, blending personal ambition with historical conflict. He is selected to play in London for Manchester United, but his recruiter is unable to take him along, as Michael's father betrayed the British Empire. Michael takes on a job to smuggle weapons in exchange for a flight from an arms trafficker. However, he is discovered by police and his truck breaks down, leading to him staying in Bairanpally while it gets fixed. The rest of the story focuses on historical conflict between Bairanpally and Hyderabad State.

== Cast ==
- Roshan Meka as Michael C. Williams
- Anaswara Rajan as Tallapudi Chandrakala
- Nandamuri Kalyana Chakravarthy as Raaji Reddy, an ex-cop turned revolutionary in Hyderabad state
- Archana as Kamalamma, Raaji Reddy’s wife
- Ranvir Shorey as Inspector Hashim
- Santhosh Prathap as Babu Deshmukh, Police officer from Land lord family, turned Hindu Razakar.
- Kovai Sarala as Andrea, Joseph's mother
- Vennela Kishore as Joseph
- Harsha Vardhan as a Patwari Ranga Rao
- Vinay Mahadev as Bikshapathi
- Balagam Sanjay Krishna as Balaraju
- Abhay Bethiganti as Sathi
- Racha Ravi as Chaari
- Muralidhar Goud as Kistayya
- Venkat Prasad as Viswanatham
- Vidyasagar as Aailayya
- Harish Kumar as Shabbir
- Laxman Meesala as Sambayya
- Hyper Aadi as Chakrapani
- Mahesh Achanta as Tirumalesh
- Rohini Reddy as Kumari
- Sreedhar Reddy Nalla as Police Officer

Special appearances

- Piyush Mishra as Football coach
- Prakash Raj as Sardar Vallabhai Patel
- Murali Sharma as Sundarayya
- Naresh as Chandrakala's father
- Kay Kay Menon as Qasim Razvi
- Dulquer Salmaan as George C. Williams, Michael's father
- Avantika as Dayana in the "I Am A Champion" song
- Ravindra Vijay as Journalist Shoiabullah Khan
- Yash Rangineni as Veerayya
- Yash Puri as Groom
- Edward Sonnenblick as Roy

== Production ==
The film was officially launched in August 2024 under the Swapna Cinema banner, with the muhurat shot receiving coverage in entertainment press. Pradeep Advaitham is credited as writer-director of the project.

== Soundtrack ==
All music is composed by Mickey J. Meyer.

No.	Title	Lyrics	Singer(s)	Length
1.	"Gira Gira Gingiraagirey"	Kasarla Shyam	Ram Miriyala	4:45
2.	"Sallangundaale"	Chandrabose	Ritesh G Rao, Manisha Eerabathini	5:27
3.	"I Am A Champion"	Krishna Kanth	P. Jayaram, Ramya Behara	4:05
4.	"Kalaga Kadhaga"	Vanamali	Krishna Tejasvi, Manisha Eerabathini	3:46
Total length:				17:53

== Release ==
The theatrical release date was officially locked for 25 December 2025 — a Christmas release. The first glimpse earlier in March showed the protagonist living under British rule, with football as a narrative element. The film was released on Netflix on 29 January 2026.

== Reception ==
Sangetha Devi of The Hindu stated that Champion is "an interesting idea that does not translate into an engaging film." The New Indian Express' Suresh Kavirayani, also echoed the same, saying, it is a "good story diluted by weak writing and execution." A critic from Eenadu praised out Roshan's performance and storyline but criticized lack of an engaging screenplay.
