= Sri Krishna Satya =

- Initial release poster
- Directed by: K. V. Reddy
- Screenplay by: K. V. Reddy
- Story by: Pingali Nagendra Rao
- Produced by: N. Trivikrama Rao
- Starring: N. T. Rama Rao; Jayalalithaa
- Cinematography: Marcus Bartley
- Edited by: G. D. Joshi
- Music by: Pendyala Nageswara Rao
- Production company: R. K. Brothers
- Release date: 24 December 1971
- Running time: 167 mins
- Country: India
- Language: Telugu

Sri Krishna Satya is a 1971 Indian Telugu-language Hindu mythological film directed by K. V. Reddy. It stars N. T. Rama Rao and Jayalalithaa, with music composed by Pendyala. The film was produced by N. Trivikrama Rao. Released in December 1971, it was the last film directed by Reddy, who died in September 1972.

Sri Krishna Satya released on 24 December 1971 and was commercially successful. The film won the Nandi Award for Second Best Feature Film for the year 1971. Jayalalithaa won the Filmfare Award for Best Actress – Telugu for the year 1972. The film was dubbed into Hindi as Tuhi Ram Tuhi Krishna.

== Music ==
Sri Krishna Satya

Film score by Pendyala Nageswara Rao
- Released: 1971
- Genre: Soundtrack
- Producer: Pendyala Nageswara Rao

Music was composed by Pendyala Nageswara Rao.

S. No	Song title	Lyrics	Singers	length
1	"Dharani Garbhami"	Pingali Nagendra Rao	Madhavapeddi Satyam	
2	"Rama Bhajana"	Pingali Nagendra Rao	K. J. Yesudas	
3	"Aaha Naa Swamy"	Pingali Nagendra Rao	S. Janaki	
4	"Kasthuri Tilakam"	Pingali Nagendra Rao	K. J. Yesudas	
5	"Kalagantini"	Pingali Nagendra Rao	S. Janaki	
6	"Sri Raghavan"	Pingali Nagendra Rao	K. J. Yesudas	
7	"Priya Priya"	C. Narayana Reddy	Ghantasala, S. Janaki	
8	"Jo Achutanand"	Samudrala Jr.	S. Janaki	
9	"Chandana Charchita"	Jayadeva	S. P. Balasubrahmanyam	
10	"Mettinadinamani Satya"	Samudrala Jr.	Ghantasala	
11	"Manchidinamenchi"	Samudrala Jr.	S. P. Balasubrahmanyam	
12	"Maatameeragalada"	Samudrala Jr.	S. Janaki	
13	"Aluka Manave"	Pingali Nagendra Rao	Ghantasala, S. Janaki	
14	"Chetanchaiyidi"	Samudrala Jr.	S. Janaki	
15	"Nuduta Kasthuri Rekha"	Samudrala Jr.	Ghantasala	
16	"Yenta Tamunuchecithino"	Samudrala Jr.	S. P. Balasubrahmanyam	
17	"Bhale Manchi"	Chandala Kesava Dasu	S. P. Balasubrahmanyam	
18	"Kotukotandira"	Samudrala Jr.	Pithapuram	
19	"Bhatta Varadudavai"	Pingali Nagendra Rao	S. Janaki	
20	"Gopi Munijana"	C. Narayana Reddy	S. Janaki	
21	"Thammuni Kodukula"	Pingali Nagendra Rao	Ghantasala	
22	"Patitulagaru"	Pingali Nagendra Rao	S. P. Balasubrahmanyam	
23	"Aaidullichena"	Pingali Nagendra Rao	Madhavapeddi Satyam	
24	"Samaram Cheyare"	Pingali Nagendra Rao	Madhavapeddi Satyam	
25	"Radheyudanu"	Pingali Nagendra Rao	Madhavapeddi Satyam	
26	"Pagaragelichithi"	Pingali Nagendra Rao	Madhavapeddi Satyam	
27	"Kavvadithosi"	Pingali Nagendra Rao	K. J. Yesudas	
28	"Aaduguru"	Pingali Nagendra Rao	Madhavapeddi Satyam	
29	"Anikindadpadu"	Pingali Nagendra Rao	Kondala Rao	
30	"Seva Dharmamunu"	Pingali Nagendra Rao	Ghantasala	
31	"Meerangabokumu"	Pingali Nagendra Rao	S. P. Balasubrahmanyam	
32	"Cheliyo Chelako"	Pingali Nagendra Rao	Ghatasala	
33	"Alugutaye Yerungani"	Pingali Nagendra Rao	Ghatasala	
34	"Jandapai Kapiraju"	Pingali Nagendra Rao	Ghatasala	
35	"Santhoshambuna Sandhi"	Pingali Nagendra Rao	S. P. Balasubrahmanyam	
36	"Okkanijesi"	Pingali Nagendra Rao	Ghatasala	
37	"Tatalu Mamalun"	Pingali Nagendra Rao	S. P. Balasubrahmanyam	
38	"Sri Krishna Geethopadesam"	Pingali Nagendra Rao	Ghantasala	

== Awards ==
- Nandi Award for Second Best Feature Film - Silver - N. Trivikrama Rao
- Filmfare Award for Best Actress – Telugu - Jayalalithaa
- Filmfare Award for Best Director - Telugu- K.V. Reddy

== Bibliography ==
- D. V. Narasaraju (2004), Tera Venuka Kathalu, Hyderabad: Creative Links
- U. Vinayaka Rao (2012), Telugu Cine Rangam - Pouranika Chitralu, Hyderabad: Telugu Academy
