= Sita Rama Kalyanam (1961 film) =

- Theatrical release poster
- Directed by: N. T. Rama Rao
- Written by: Samudrala Sr(dialogues)
- Screenplay by: Dhanekula Buchi Venkata Krishna Chowdhary
- Story by: Dhanekula Buchi Venkata Krishna Chowdhary
- Produced by: N. Trivikrama Rao
- Starring: N. T. Rama Rao; B. Saroja Devi; Haranath; Geetanjali; Kanta Rao; Sobhan Babu
- Cinematography: Ravikant Nagaich
- Edited by: Veerappa
- Music by: Gali Penchala Narasimha Rao
- Production company: National Art Theater
- Release date: 6 January 1961
- Running time: 182 minutes
- Country: India
- Language: Telugu

Sita Rama Kalyanam (transl. The marriage of Sita and Rama) is a 1961 Indian Telugu-language Hindu mythological film directed by N. T. Rama Rao in his directorial debut. It stars Rama Rao, Haranath, Geetanjali, B. Saroja Devi, Kanta Rao, Sobhan Babu. The film was produced by N. Trivikrama Rao under the National Art Theatres banner. The music was composed by Gali Penchala Narasimha Rao.

The film was a commercial success. It also won the Certificate of Merit for Best Feature Film in Telugu at the 8th National Film Awards. The film was dubbed into Tamil with the same title and was released on 3 February 1961.

== Cast ==
- N. T. Rama Rao as Ravana
- B. Saroja Devi as Mandodari
- Haranath as Rama
- Geetanjali as Sita
- Kanta Rao as Narada
- Sobhan Babu as Lakshmana
- V. Nagayya as Dasaratha
- Mikkilineni as Janaka
- Gummadi as Vishwamitra
- K. V. S. Sarma as Parashurama
- Kommineni Seshagiri Rao as Bharata
- M. Kameswara Rao as Brahma
- Udaykumar as Kumbhakarna
- A. V. Subba Rao Jr. as Vibhishana
- Arja Janardhana Rao as Hiranyakashipu
- Kasturi Siva Rao as Vaishya
- Sarathi as Nalakubara
- Master Nagaraju as Prahlada / Young Lakshmana
- Chhaya Devi as Sumedha Devi (Janaka's wife)
- Swarna as Soorpanakha
- Kuchala Kumari as Rambha

== Production ==
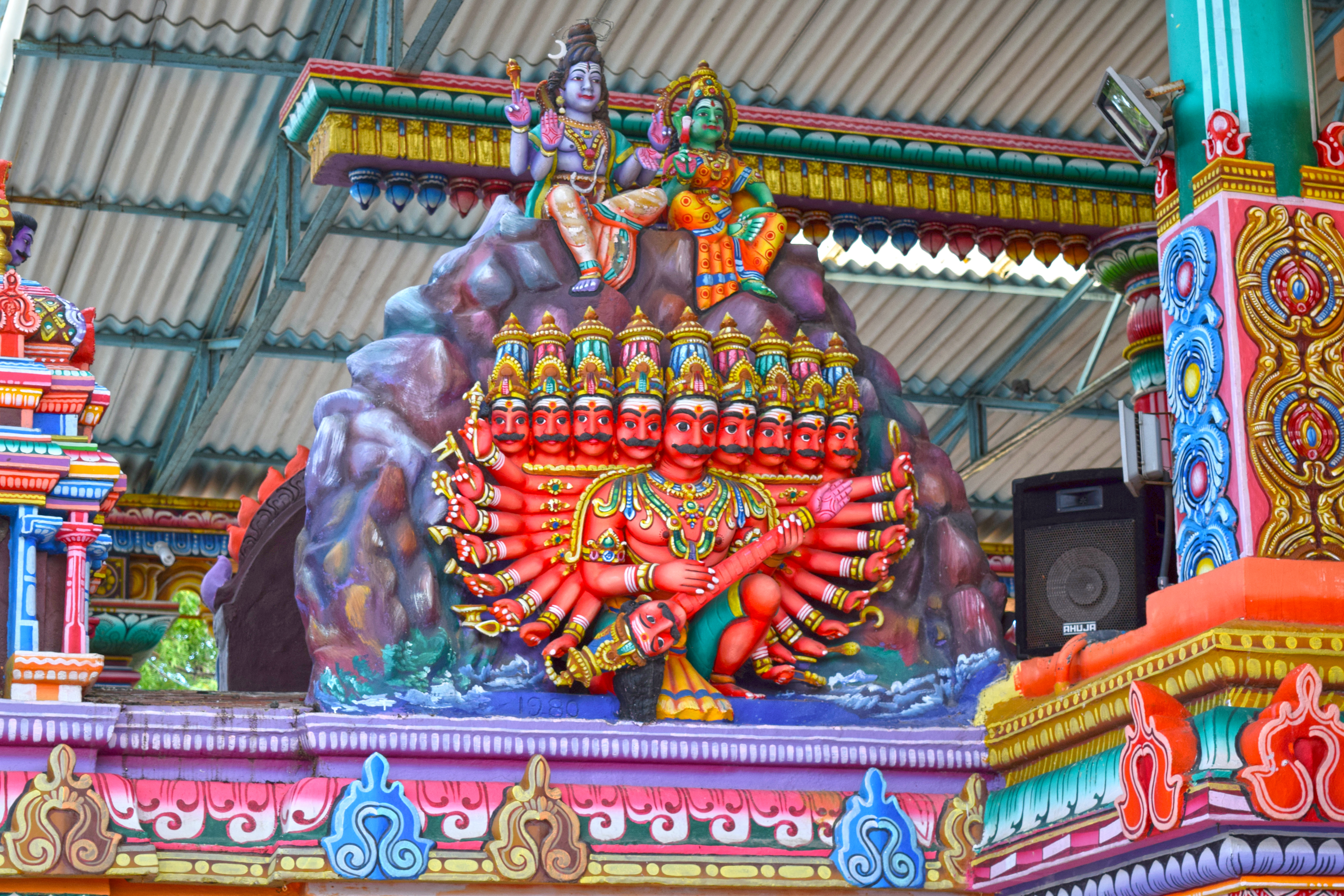
The tale of Ravananugraha (pictured) inspired a sequence in the film in which Rama Rao's character Ravana would sport ten heads all chanting Om Namah Shivaya while lifting the Kailasa hill on his shoulders

N. T. Rama Rao's portrayal of the demon king Ravana (the antagonist of the Hindu epic Ramayana) in Bhookailas (1958) earned him critical acclaim. However, after the release of its Kannada-language version Bhookailasa in the same year which featured a different cast and crew, Rama Rao's portrayal was often compared with that of Rajkumar who played Ravana. This, along with Ravana's reputation as a renowned Shiva devotee, made Rama Rao consider reprising the role in another film which focused on a more layered representation of the character. He and writer Samudrala Sr. studied Ravana's arcs from various versions of Ramayana and other mythologies. Later, Rama Rao's friend Dhanekula Buchi Venkata Krishna Chowdhary came up with a story which they liked, and Samudrala wrote the dialogues, songs and poems. Though the film's narrative was centered around Ravana, Samudrala named the film Sita Rama Kalyanam after Ramayana's protagonists Rama and Sita.

Rama Rao's brother N. Trivikrama Rao decided to produce the film for his company National Art Theatre and approached the former's mentor K. V. Reddy to direct the film. Reddy declined the offer, saying that he could not envision Rama Rao playing a demon. Rama Rao then decided to direct the film himself, marking his directorial debut. He, however, refrained from crediting himself as the director and instead paid homage to his parents. When Trivikrama Rao suggested that Rama Rao should play a dual role as both Rama and Ravana, the latter refused and chose to work with younger actors. He met Haranath at Pondy Bazaar and signed him to play Rama. Sobhan Babu was cast as Rama's brother Lakshmana. Impressed with her cameo appearance in Rani Ratnaprabha (1960), Rama Rao cast Geetanjali for the role of Sita. B. Saroja Devi, Gummadi and V. Nagayya were cast in key supporting roles. Sita Rama Kalyanam also marked Kanta Rao's first on-screen appearance as Narada, a mythological character which he would reprise later in multiple unrelated Telugu films.

Rama Rao approached M. A. Rahman, the cinematographer of the former's acting debut Mana Desam (1949), to collaborate for this film as the director of photography. When Rahman was unavailable, he signed Ravikant Nagaich for the job, marking the latter's debut in Telugu cinema. S. P. S. Veerappa edited the film and I. N. Murthy served as the co-director. All the sequences were filmed in sets erected at the Vijaya Vauhini Studios in Madras (now Chennai). For filming the Ravananugraha sequence, Nagaich opted for using mask shots capturing varying expressions of Rama Rao instead of working with nine dummy heads. This took more than ten hours to shoot, and Rama Rao had to stay motionless for longer intervals.

== Music ==
S. Rajeswara Rao was signed to compose the film's soundtrack and score. He worked on the song "Kanarara Kailasa Nivasa" and a poem "Jayatwada Bravibhrama" before walking out of the film citing creative differences with Rama Rao. Gali Penchala Narasimha Rao replaced him and composed the score and the remaining songs. Samudrala wrote the lyrics for all the songs and composed the poems. Emani Sankara Sastry recited the veena for the Ravananugraha sequence. The soundtrack was released on 31 December 1961 and was marketed by His Master's Voice.

| S. No | Song title | Singers | length |
|---|---|---|---|
| 1 | Deva Deva Parandhama | P. B. Srinivas | 3:38 |
| 2 | Kanarara Kailasa Nivasa | Ghantasala | 4:11 |
| 3 | Jagadeka Matha Gauri | Ghantasala | 3:21 |
| 4 | Parama Saiva | Ghantasala | 1:16 |
| 5 | Hey Parvathi | Ghantasala | 1:38 |
| 6 | Sashtiryojana | M. S. Rama Rao | 1:05 |
| 7 | Danava Kula | Ghantasala | 1:39 |
| 8 | Padmasane | M. S. Rama Rao | 0:54 |
| 9 | Veena Padave | P. Susheela | 3:44 |
| 10 | Inupa Kattadal | P. B. Srinivas | 0:38 |
| 11 | Sarasala Javaralanu | P. Leela | 4:12 |
| 12 | Nelatha | Ghantasala | 1:02 |
| 13 | Kolupuga | P. Leela | 1:00 |
| 14 | Janakundu Suthudu | Ghantasala | 1:33 |
| 15 | Govindha Madhava | Ghantasala | 8:31 |
| 16 | Veyi Kannulu | P. Leela | 2:57 |
| 17 | Kowsalya Supraja | M. S. Rama Rao | 0:52 |
| 18 | Nandhinavamaninchi | P. B. Srinivas | 0:52 |
| 19 | Pooni Bommaku | P. Leela | 0:51 |
| 20 | Bhoomiki | P. B. Srinivas | 0:42 |
| 21 | Chiru Nagavu | P. B. Srinivas | 0:50 |
| 22 | Jagadeka Matha Gauri | P. Susheela | 3:22 |
| 23 | Sree Raghavam | M. S. Rama Rao | 1:01 |
| 24 | O Sukumara | Ghantasala, P. Susheela | 3:14 |
| 25 | Sri Seetaramula Kalyanamu | P. Susheela | 5:49 |
| 26 | Hey Rama Rama | M. S. Rama Rao | 0:52 |
| 27 | Mangalam | M. S. Rama Rao | 1:22 |

== Release and reception ==
Sita Rama Kalyanam was released theatrically on 6 January 1961, in 28 centres, with an attempt to cash in on the Makara Sankranti holiday weekend. Due to good word of mouth, the film was a commercial success, completing a 50-day run in all the 28 centres. It also completed a 156-day run at the Sri Lakshmi Picture Palace in Vijayawada. It also won the Certificate of Merit for Best Feature Film in Telugu at the 8th National Film Awards. The film was dubbed into Tamil with the same title and was released on 3 February 1961.
