= Rani Ratnaprabha =

- Theatrical release poster
- Directed by: B. A. Subba Rao
- Written by: Vempati Sadasivabrahmam; P. R. Kauodinya (dialogues)
- Screenplay by: B. A. Subba Rao; Vempati Sadasivabrahmam; K. V. Kutumba Rao
- Story by: Vempati Sadasivabrahmam
- Produced by: B. A. Subba Rao
- Starring: N. T. Rama Rao; Anjali Devi
- Cinematography: C. Nageswara Rao
- Edited by: K. A. Marthand
- Music by: S. Rajeswara Rao
- Production company: B. A. S. Productions
- Release date: 27 May 1960
- Country: India
- Language: Telugu

Rani Ratnaprabha (transl. Queen Ratnaprabha) is a 1960 Telugu-language swashbuckling fantasy film, produced and directed by B. A. Subba Rao under the B. A. S. Productions banner. It stars N. T. Rama Rao, Anjali Devi with music composed by S. Rajeswara Rao.

== Cast ==
- N. T. Rama Rao as Amara Simhudu
- Anjali Devi as Rani Ratnaprabha
- Relangi as Bhaja Bhadraiah
- Gummadi as Dharmapala
- C.S.R as Mahamantri Sarpakaketu
- Balakrishna
- Surabhi Balasaraswathi as Nukkalamma
- Sandhya as Manjula

== Soundtrack ==
Rani Ratnaprabha

Film score by S. Rajeswara Rao
- Released: 1960
- Genre: Soundtrack
- Length: 39:52
- Label: His Master's Voice
- Producer: S. Rajeswara Rao

Music composed by S. Rajeswara Rao. Music released by His Master's Voice.

S. No	Song title	Lyrics	Singers	length
1	"Yemicheppudunu"	Kosaraju	Ghantasala	3:45
2	"Yekkada Daachava Sipayee"	Aarudhra	P. B. Srinivas, P. Susheela	3:43
3	"Palletoori Vaalamu"	Kosaraju	Swarnalatha	4:15
4	"Ninna Kanipindhindi"	Aarudhra	Ghantasala	3:46
5	"Anuraagamu"	Aarudhra	P. B. Srinivas, P. Susheela	3:56
6	"Vinnava Nookaalamma"	Kosaraju	Ghantasala, Swarnalatha	2:42
7	"Manasara Ninuvalachi"	Aarudhra	P. Susheela	2:42
8	"Neetaina Paduchunnadoy"	Kosaraju	Ghantasala, Swarnalatha	3:16
9	"Manasulu Mamathalu"	Aarudhra	S. Janaki, Swarnalatha, Satyarao	5:32
10	"Kannulalo Kulukule"	Kosaraju	P. Susheela	3:28
11	"Oho Andala Maharaja"	Aarudhra	P. Susheela	2:17
