= Lankeswarudu =

- Theatrical release poster
- Directed by: Dasari Narayana Rao
- Written by: Dasari Narayana Rao
- Produced by: Vadde Ramesh
- Starring: Chiranjeevi; Revathi; Radha; Mohan Babu; Kaikala Satyanarayana; Raghuvaran
- Cinematography: K. S. Hari
- Edited by: G. G. Krishna Rao
- Music by: Raj–Koti
- Release date: 27 October 1989
- Country: India
- Language: Telugu

Lankeswarudu (transl. Overlord of Lanka) is a 1989 Indian Telugu-language action drama film written and directed by Dasari Narayana Rao, starring Chiranjeevi, Radha, Revathi, Kaikala Satyanarayana, Mohan Babu and Raghuvaran. This was Dasari Narayana Rao's 100th movie.

== Plot ==
Shankar (Chiranjeevi) and Revathi are siblings and are orphans. To feed his hungry sister, Shankar steals bread from a nearby tea stall. At the same time, there is another orphan (Kalyan Chakravarthy) boy, who is also hungry and looking at them; Shankar gives him a piece of bread. Shankar takes up the responsibility of raising his younger sister and also the orphan. Shankar does everything possible to earn bread and butter for them, and slowly he transforms from a small-time thief to a small-time gang leader. During this time, he helps a village nearby, who treats him like a god. Once he bashes up Dada's (Kaikala Satyanarayana) men, and an impressed Dada offers him work. Shankar rejects working for him, but when dada offers him partnership, then he accepts the proposal. Apart from crime, Shankar is also a good dancer and he teaches dancing too; Radha is a big fan of his. She falls in love with him and sings a couple of quick duets. Shankar realizes that Revati is in love with Kalyan Chakravarthy and he does their wedding. Kalyan Chakravarthy becomes a police officer with the help of Shankar, in one of the crimes he gets some info regarding Dada's involvement. Kalyan Chakravarthy asks Shankar's help in eliminating Dada's group without knowing that Shankar is a partner in the same crime syndicate. Then Shankar decides to quit Dada's company and conveys the same to Dada. Dada accepts the proposal, but he says that he is not responsible if his brother-in-law dies in his hands. So Shankar drops the idea of leaving Dada's company, Dada makes him the head of the syndicate. Rexon and Michael are not happy with this, so they talk another gang into eliminating Shankar and Dada. Meanwhile, Kalyan Chakravarthy and Revathi come to know that Shankar is a criminal; they question him on that front. He tries to explain what scenarios led him to this. But they leave him. Michael, Rexon and their new gang attack and kill Dada and the villagers, whom Shankar helps. Angry, Shankar kills all goons and surrenders himself to his brother-in-law.

== Cast ==
- Chiranjeevi as Shankar
- Revathi as Shankar's sister
- Radha as Shankar's love interest
- Mohan Babu as Michael
- Kaikala Satyanarayana as Dada
- Raghuvaran as Rexon
- Mahesh Anand as Mahesh
- Nandamuri Kalyan Chakravarthy as Kalyan
- Allu Ramalingaiah
- Nagesh
- Ramakrishna as Police Chief
- Hari Prasad
- Brahmanandam
- Anandaraj as Ananth Raj
- Bob Christo
- Vijayachander
- Tyagaraju
- Srihari
- Jeeva
- Maganti Sudhakar
- Naga Babu as Satyam
- Sakshi Ranga Rao
- Devi
- Lakshmi Priya
- Lakshmipani

== Soundtrack ==
Lankeshwarudu

Soundtrack album by Raj–Koti
- Released: 1989
- Genre: Soundtrack
- Length: 24:57
- Label: Aditya Music
- Producer: Raj–Koti

Raj–Koti chronology
Maharajashri Mayagaadu (1988)	Lankeshwarudu (1989)	Sakshi (1989)

The music of the film was composed by the duo Raj–Koti. All songs written by Dasari Narayana Rao. All the songs were lapped up well by the public and are remembered even today. The songs "Jivvumani Kondagaali" and "Padaharella Vayasu" became very popular.

No.	Title	Singer(s)	Length
1.	"Jivvumani Kondagali"	Mano, S. Janaki	4:34
2.	"Kanne Pilla Vediki"	Mano, S. Janaki	4:41
3.	"Padaharella Vayasu"	S. P. Balasubrahmanyam, S. Janaki	5:56
4.	"Po Po Pothe Po"	Mano	5:46
5.	"Ey Babu Ey Ey Babu"	Mano, S. Janaki	3:59
Total length:			24:57

== Box office ==
The film is an average grosser, but the dubbed version of Lankeswarudu in Tamil was a very huge hit and ran for more than 100 days in many centers across Tamil Nadu.
