= Sumangali (1983 film) =

1983 film by D. Yoganand

- Theatrical release poster
- Directed by: D. Yoganand
- Written by: Aaroor Dass (dialogues)
- Story by: Ram Kelkar
- Produced by: D. Yoganand
- Starring: Sivaji Ganesan; Sujatha; Prabhu; Geetha
- Cinematography: G. Or. Nathan
- Edited by: R. Vittal
- Music by: M. S. Viswanathan
- Production company: Alankar Films
- Release date: 12 August 1983
- Country: India
- Language: Tamil

Sumangali (transl. Married Woman) is a 1983 Indian Tamil-language drama film, directed and produced by D. Yoganand. The film stars Sivaji Ganesan, Sujatha, Prabhu and Geetha. It is a remake of the Hindi film Aasha (1980). The film was released on 12 August 1983.

== Plot ==
Ramu is a BA graduate who drives a lorry for a living. He meets singer/dancer Roopadevi while on a trip and soon considers her a dear friend. The orphaned Roopadevi comes to love Ramu but backs off when she realises that he is in love with Thulasi. Ramu's boss, Vinayagam wants Ramu to marry his daughter Lakshmi. He is enraged when Ramu and Thulasi marry and arranges for Ramu to die on his next trip. Ramu escapes but his family believes him to be dead. Ramu's mother kicks Thulasi out blaming her bad luck for her son's death. A despondent Thulasi attempts suicide and is thought to be dead. When Ramu returns home, he's heartbroken and leaves in despair. Roopa runs into him and convinces him to sing with her as a means of dealing with his depression.

Thulasi, meanwhile, was rescued after her suicide attempt by a temple priest. She is now blind and also learns that she is pregnant. The priest, his wife and another orphaned young man, Prakash become her surrogate family. She gives birth to a girl that she names Ramathulasi as Ramu once wanted. When Prakash learns there's a chance for Thulasi to regain her sight with an operation, he heads to Calcutta to make the money needed. Ramathulasi sells dolls door to door to bring in some much-needed cash for the family. She meets Ramu and Roopa while selling dolls and charms them both. Ramu and Roopa are now a very successful performing team and after years of mourning, Ramu has agreed to marry Roopa. The new couple are drawn to Ramathulasi and offer to pay for her mother's operation. Roopa and Thulasi become friends but Ramu somehow always misses seeing Thulasi. Roopa is by Thulasi's side when her operation is done and she regains her sight. Thulasi promises to be by Roopa at her wedding. She recognises Ramu at the wedding and runs away not wanting to ruin Roopa's life. Ramu is soon made aware of Thulasi's existence and must make a decision on the direction of his life.

== Cast ==
- Sivaji Ganesan as Ramu
- Geetha as Roopadevi
- Sujatha as Thulasi Vedarathnam
- Y. G. Mahendran as Gopal
- Silk Smitha as Lakshmi
- Prabhu as Prakash
- Baby Meena as Ramathulasi
- V. K. Ramasamy as Vinayagam
- S. N. Lakshmi
- Pushpalatha as Ramu's mother
- MLA Thangaraj

== Soundtrack ==
Soundtrack was composed by M. S. Viswanathan.

Track listing
No.	Title	Singer(s)	Length
1.	"Engappanukkum"	L. R. Eswari
2.	"Ethirkalam Oliveesum"	T. M. Soundararajan
3.	"Isai Paadum Paravai"	Vani Jairam
4.	"Ithu Kalaingarkal Ulagam"	Chorus, T. M. Soundararajan
5.	"Ohoho Rasikargale"	Chorus, T. M. Soundararajan

== Reception ==
Jayamanmadhan of Kalki called the film outdated.
