= Pichi Pullayya =

- Theatrical release poster
- Directed by: T. Prakash Rao
- Written by: Anisetti (dialogues)
- Screenplay by: T. Prakash Rao
- Story by: T. Prakash Rao
- Produced by: N. Trivikrama Rao
- Starring: N. T. Rama Rao; Sowcar Janaki; Krishna Kumari
- Cinematography: M. A. Rehman
- Edited by: G. D. Joshi
- Music by: T. V. Raju
- Production company: National Art Theaters
- Release date: 17 July 1953
- Running time: 161 minutes
- Country: India
- Language: Telugu

Pichi Pullayya (transl. Crazy Pullayya) is a 1953 Indian Telugu-language drama film directed by T. Prakash Rao. It stars N. T. Rama Rao, Sowcar Janaki and Krishna Kumari, with music composed by T. V. Raju. The film was produced by N. Trivikrama Rao under the National Art Theatre banner.

== Cast ==
- N. T. Rama Rao as Pullayya
- Sowcar Janaki as Vasantha
- Krishna Kumari as Kantham
- Gummadi as Bhupala Rao
- Ramana Reddy as Neelakantam
- Amarnath as Chinna Babu
- Mahankali Venkaiah as Kodandaramayya
- Koduru Achaiah as Seshayya
- Chaya Devi as Manorama Devi
- Hemalatha
- Mohana as Nurse

== Music ==
Pichi Pullayya

Film score by T. V. Raju
- Released: 1953
- Genre: Soundtrack
- Labels: His Master's Voice & Columbia Audio
- Producer: T. V. Raju

Music was composed by T. V. Raju. Lyrics were written by Anisetti Subba Rao.

S. No.	Song title	Singers	length
1	"Basthiki Poyeti"	A. Pundarikakshayya	
2	"Aalapinchana"	Ghantasala	3:01
3	"Yella Velalandu"	Ghantasala, R. Balasaraswathi Devi	
4	"Aanandame"	P. Susheela	
5	"Sokapu Thuphanu"	Madhavapeddi Satyam	
6	"Manasara Oka Saari"	A. P. Komala	
7	"Avamanaalaku Baliavuthunna"	M. S. Rama Rao	
8	"Yelanoie"	Madhavapeddi Satyam	2:23
9	"Sokapu Tupaanu"	M. S. Rama Rao	
10	"Rarara"	Pithapuram, A. P. Komala	
