= Thodu Dongalu (1954 film) =

- Theatrical release poster
- Directed by: D. Yoganand
- Written by: Samudrala Jr (dialogues)
- Produced by: N. Trivikrama Rao
- Starring: N. T. Rama Rao; Gummadi; T. G. Kamala Devi
- Cinematography: M. A. Rehman
- Music by: T. V. Raju
- Production company: National Art Theater
- Release date: 15 April 1954
- Running time: 142 minutes
- Country: India
- Language: Telugu

Thodu Dongalu (transl. Joint Thieves) is a 1954 Indian Telugu-language drama film directed by D. Yoganand. It was produced by N. Trivikrama Rao under the National Art Theaters banner. It stars N. T. Rama Rao, Gummadi, T. G. Kamala Devi; the music was composed by T. V. Raju.

== Soundtrack ==
- "Unnateeru Neevunnadi Undi" (Singer: Ghantasala Venkateswara Rao)

== Awards ==
- 2nd National Film Awards (1954) - National Film Award for Best Feature Film in Telugu - Certificate of Merit
