= N. T. Rama Rao =

Indian actor and former Chief Minister of Andhra Pradesh (1923–1996)

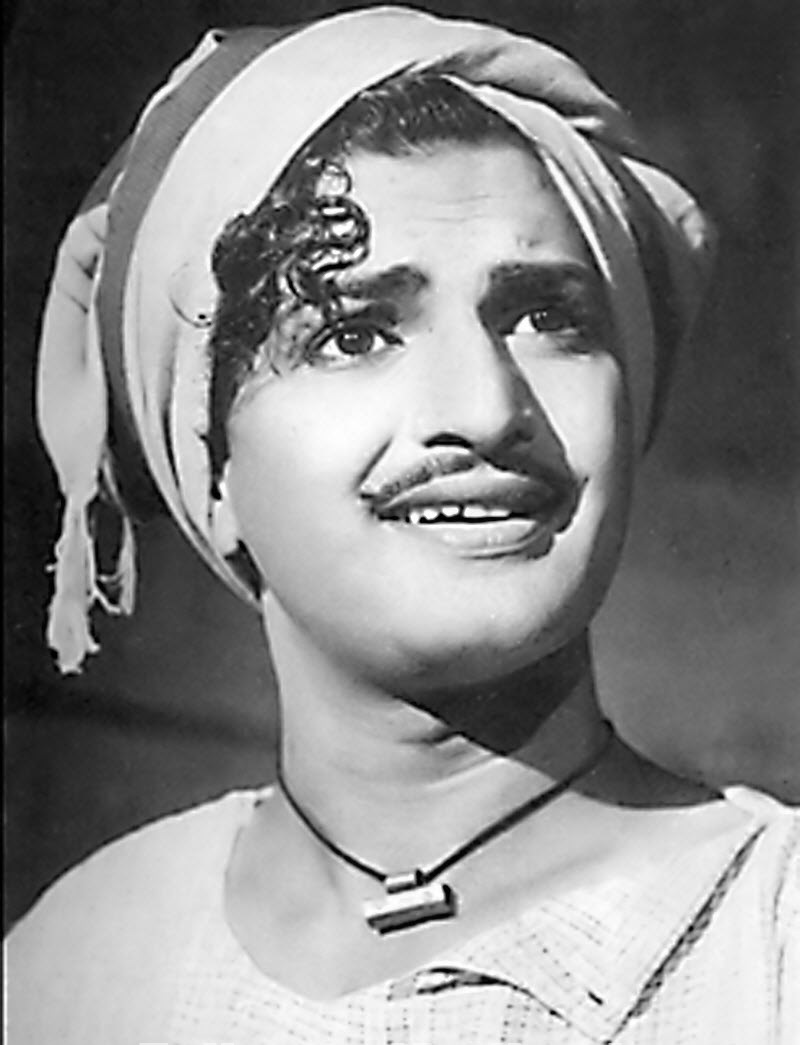
- Rao in a still from Daasi (1952)

10th Chief Minister of Andhra Pradesh
- In office 12 December 1994 – 1 September 1995
- Governor: Krishan Kant
- Cabinet: NTR IV
- Preceded by: Kotla Vijaya Bhaskara Reddy
- Succeeded by: N. Chandrababu Naidu
- In office 16 September 1984 – 2 December 1989
- Governor: Shankar Dayal Sharma; Kumudben Joshi
- Cabinet: NTR II & III
- Preceded by: Nadendla Bhaskara Rao
- Succeeded by: Marri Chenna Reddy
- In office 9 January 1983 – 16 August 1984
- Governor: K. C. Abraham; Thakur Ram Lal
- Cabinet: NTR I
- Preceded by: Kotla Vijaya Bhaskara Reddy
- Succeeded by: Nadendla Bhaskara Rao

10th Leader of the Opposition in the Andhra Pradesh Legislative Assembly
- In office 5 January 1990 – 10 December 1994
- Governor: Kumudben Joshi; Krishan Kant
- Chief Minister: Marri Chenna Reddy; Nedurumalli Janardhana Reddy; Kotla Vijaya Bhaskara Reddy
- Preceded by: Mogaligundla Baga Reddy
- Succeeded by: P. Janardhan Reddy

Member of Legislative Assembly, Andhra Pradesh
- In office 10 March 1985 – 18 January 1996
- Preceded by: Pamishetty Ranganayakulu
- Succeeded by: Nandamuri Harikrishna
- Constituency: Hindupuram
- In office 1983–1985
- Preceded by: Katari Satyanarayana Rao
- Succeeded by: Raavi Sobhanadri Chowdary
- Constituency: Gudivada

1st President of Telugu Desam Party
- In office 29 March 1982 – 1 September 1995
- General Secretary: N. Chandrababu Naidu (1983–1995)
- Preceded by: Position established
- Succeeded by: N. Chandrababu Naidu

Personal details
- Born: Nandamuri Taraka Rama Rao; 28 May 1923 Nimmakuru, Madras Presidency, British Raj (present-day Andhra Pradesh, India)
- Died: 18 January 1996 (aged 72) Hyderabad, Andhra Pradesh, India (present-day Telangana, India)
- Resting place: NTR Gardens
- Party: Telugu Desam Party
- Spouses: Nandamuri Basavatarakam (m. 1943; died 1985); Lakshmi Parvathi (m. 1993)
- Relations: Nandamuri family
- Children: 12
- Occupation: Actor; film director; film producer; screenwriter; film editor; philanthropist; politician
- Awards: Padma Shri (1968)

Nandamuri Taraka Rama Rao (28 May 1923 – 18 January 1996), often referred to by his initials NTR, was an Indian actor, film director, film producer, screenwriter, film editor, philanthropist, and politician who served as the chief minister of Andhra Pradesh over three terms for seven years. In 1982, he founded the Telugu Desam Party (TDP), the first regional party of Andhra Pradesh. He is regarded as one of the most influential figures of Indian cinema. He starred in over 300 films, predominantly in Telugu cinema, and was referred to as "Viswa Vikhyatha Nata Sarvabhouma" (transl. Universally-renowned star of acting). He was one of the earliest method actors of Indian cinema. In 2013, Rao was voted as "Greatest Indian Actor of All Time" in a CNN-IBN national poll conducted on the occasion of the Centenary of Indian Cinema.

Rama Rao made his debut as an actor in a Telugu social film Mana Desam, directed by L. V. Prasad in 1949. His breakthrough performance was in Raju Peda (1954) and he gained popularity in the 1960s, becoming well known for his portrayals of Hindu deities, especially Krishna, Shiva and Rama, roles which have made him a "messiah of the masses" and a prominent figure in cinema. He later became known for portraying antagonistic characters and Robin Hood-esque hero characters in films. He starred in such films as Pathala Bhairavi (1951), the only south Indian film screened at the first International Film Festival of India, Malliswari (1951), featured at Peking Film Festival, Beijing, China, the enduring classics Mayabazar (1957) and Nartanasala (1963), featured at the Afro-Asian Film Festival that was held in Jakarta, Indonesia. All the four films were included in CNN-IBN's list of "100 greatest Indian films of all time". He co-produced Ummadi Kutumbam, nominated by Film Federation of India as one of its entries to the 1968 Moscow Film Festival. Besides Telugu, he has also acted in a few Tamil films.

Rama Rao has received numerous honours and accolades, including the Padma Shri in 1968. He also received three National Film Awards for co-producing Thodu Dongalu (1954) and Seetharama Kalyanam (1960) under National Art Theater, Madras, and for directing Varakatnam (1970). Rao garnered the Nandi Award for Best Actor for Kodalu Diddina Kapuram in 1970, and the Inaugural Filmfare Award for Best Actor – Telugu in 1972 for Badi Panthulu.

He served four tumultuous terms as Chief Minister of Andhra Pradesh between 1983 and 1995. He was a strong advocate of a distinct Telugu cultural identity, distinguishing it from the erstwhile Madras State with which it was often associated. At the national level, he was instrumental in the formation of the National Front, a coalition of non-Congress parties which governed India in 1989 and 1990. His political career brought vast changes in the polity and political landscape of India since its independence.

== Early life ==
Nandamuri Taraka Rama Rao was born on 28 May 1923 in a Telugu Hindu agrarian family to Nandamuri Lakshmaih Chowdary and Nandamuri Venkata Ramamma, in Nimmakuru, a small village in Gudivada taluk of Krishna district, which was a part of the erstwhile Madras Presidency of British India. He was given in adoption to his paternal uncle because his uncle and aunt were childless. He was first educated by a teacher who came from a nearby village, whom he would attribute his command of Telugu to, as well as his father, an aspiring thespian and patron of the arts. Although children were normally pulled out of school after completing their primary education in that time and place, on account of being the first male child in the family, his father sent him to Vijayawada to continue his education, matriculating in 1940 before studying at SRR & CVR College and completing a bachelor's degree from Andhra Christian College in Guntur.

After qualifying for the civil service during the Madras Presidency under British India, he took a job as a sub-registrar in Madras Service Commission at Mangalagiri, northeast of Guntur. Rao quit within three weeks to pursue a career in acting. He developed a baritone singing voice as a young man.

== Personal life ==
In May 1942, at the age of 18, while still pursuing his Intermediate, Rao married Basava Rama Tarakam, his cousin and the daughter of his maternal uncle. The marriage resulted in twelve children; including eight sons and four daughters, namely: Ramakrishna Sr., Jayakrishna, Saikrishna, Harikrishna, Mohana Krishna, Balakrishna, Ramakrishna Jr., Jayashankarakrishna, Lokeswari, Purandeswari, Bhuvaneswari, and Umamaheswari. Tarakam died of cancer in 1985. In her memory, Rao established the Basavatarakam Indo-American Cancer Hospital in Hyderabad, in 1986. In 1993, NTR married Lakshmi Parvathi, a Telugu writer.

Rao's sixth son, Nandamuri Balakrishna, has been one of the leading actors in Tollywood since the mid-1980s. He also started his career as a child artist. Rao's third daughter, Bhuvaneswari, is married to chief minister Nara Chandrababu Naidu. Rao's second daughter, Daggubati Purandeswari, is a politician, who has represented the Indian National Congress in the Lok Sabha and served as a Union Minister. She later shifted her allegiance to the Bharatiya Janata Party.

Rama Rao died of a heart attack on 18 January 1996 at his residence in Hyderabad, aged 72. He was cremated, and his ashes were immersed at Srirangapatna by his second wife Lakshmi Parvathi, eight years later, in May 2004.

== Film career ==
NTR made his debut as an actor in a Telugu social film Mana Desam, directed by L. V. Prasad in 1949. Following this, he appeared in Palletoori Pilla (1950), directed by B. A. Subba Rao. He got his breakthrough performances in Raju Peda (1954)

His first religious film was in 1957, where he portrayed the Hindu god Krishna in the blockbuster film Maya Bazaar. He played Krishna in 17 films, including landmark films such as Sri Krishnarjuna Yudham (1962), the Tamil film Karnan (1964) and Daana Veera Soora Karna (1977). He was also known for his portrayal of the god Rama, performing in films including Lava Kusa (1963) and Sri Ramanjaneya Yuddham (1974). He has also portrayed other characters from the Ramayana, such as Ravana in Bhookailas (1958) and Seetharama Kalyanam (1961). He portrayed the god Vishnu in films such as Sri Venkateswara Mahatyam (1960) and the god Shiva in Dakshayagnam (1962). He has also enacted the roles of Mahabharata characters, such as Bheeshma, Arjuna, Bhima, Karna and Duryodhana.

He gained popularity in the 1960s when he became well known for his portrayals of Hindu deities, especially Krishna, Shiva and Rama, roles and a prominent figure in the history of cinema. He starred in such films as Pathala Bhairavi (1951), the only south Indian film screened at the first International Film Festival of India, Malliswari (1951), featured at Peking Film Festival, Beijing, China, the enduring classics Mayabazar (1957) and Nartanasala (1963).

In the later half of his career, Rao became a screenwriter. Despite having no formal training in scriptwriting, he authored several screenplays for his own movies as well as for other producers. He also produced many of his films as well as other actor's films through his film production house National Art Theater Private Limited, Madras. Rao founded the film studios Ramakrishna Studios initially in Musheerabad in memory of his eldest son, Nandamuri Ramakrishna Sr. who died in 1962. Later It was shifted to Nacharam. He co-produced Ummadi Kutumbam, nominated by Film Federation of India as one of its entries to the 1968 Moscow Film Festival. He actively campaigned for the construction of a large number of cinemas through this production house. He was influential in designing and implementing a financial system that funded the production and distribution of movies. He was so dedicated to his profession that he would often learn new things to portray a particular character on-screen perfectly and realistically. At the age of 40, he learnt dance from the Kuchipudi dancer Vempati Chinna Satyam for his role in the film Nartanasala (1963). Later in his career, he transitioned from portraying princely characters in commercial films to roles featuring working-class heroes who challenged societal structures. These films resonated with a broad audience. Some of these films are Devudu Chesina Manushulu (1973), Adavi Ramudu (1977), Driver Ramudu (1979), Vetagadu (1979), Sardar Papa Rayudu (1980), Kondaveeti Simham (1981), Justice Chowdary (1982) and Bobbili Puli (1982). He also portrayed fantasy roles, his notable film in that genre being Yamagola (1977). His film Lava Kusa, in which he starred as Rama, collected ₹10 million in 1963. He directed and acted in the hagiographical film Srimadvirat Veerabrahmendra Swami Charitra (1984). He also acted in films such as Brahmashi Viswamitra (1991) and Major Chandrakanth (1993). His last film was Srinatha Kavi Sarvabhowmudu, a biographical film on the Telugu poet Srinatha, which released in 1993.

He starred in over 300 films, predominantly in Telugu cinema, and was referred to as "Viswa Vikhyatha Nata Sarvabhouma" (transl. Universally-renowned star of acting). He was one of the earliest method actors of Indian cinema.

Rao received three National Film Awards for co-producing Thodu Dongalu (1954) and Seetharama Kalyanam (1960) under National Art Theater, Madras, and for directing Varakatnam (1970).

== Political career ==
Rao's political career with the Telugu Desam Party in Andhra Pradesh brought tremendous changes in the polity and political landscape of India since its independence. Nadendla Bhaskara Rao, a politician belonging to Congress (I) contemplated forming a new political party after he was dropped as a minister. He came in contact with Rao, who also expressed his interest to do public service after his 60th birthday. Rao announced the launch of Telugu Desam Party (TDP) on 29 March 1982 in Hyderabad in a meeting with the enthusiastic supporters and delegates of the proposed party, which included N. Bhaskara Rao, who by then had resigned from Congress(I). He said that this decision was based on a historic need to rid Andhra Pradesh of the corrupt and inept rule of the Indian National Congress, which had governed the state since its formation in 1956. After general body meeting of party named Mahanaadu in May 1982, he travelled to tell people of his mission while the elections were several months away. He used a modified 1950s Chevrolet van for his campaign. Some of the modifications included a sunroof to climb up for addressing the public, along with a public address system and focus lights. The vehicle was named Chaitanya Ratham (Chariot of Awakening), and this style of campaigning became an innovation that was followed by several others later. He wore khaki pants and a bush shirt. He lived his life on the road avoiding guest houses or luxury houses of his fans, even performing daily activities such as shaving and bathing by the roadside. His food was a simple meal prepared by a roadside assistant. Eenadu, an upcoming Telugu daily newspaper, supported Rao's campaign by providing information on local issues for use in his speeches and by extensive coverage in the paper with reports from an accompanying reporter and photographer. The paper's circulation jumped from 2.3 lakh to 3.5 lakh during June - December 1982 coinciding with campaign period.

In the elections, the TDP allied with the newly formed Sanjaya Vichara Manch (SVM) party. The TDP manifesto projected itself as the real alternative to the Congress (I). It fielded ordinary persons who had integrity, competence and loyalty as its candidates. Rao himself decided to contest from two assembly constituencies, Gudivada and Tirupati. In his Chaitanya Ratham, Rao travelled across the state of Andhra Pradesh, travelling through all the districts while his son Nandamuri Harikrishna drove the van. He drove over 75,000 kilometres during his campaign, a distinctive sight with the van's yellow party flags and banners and Rao sitting on top of the vehicle hailing the crowds. He campaigned for restoring the dignity of the Telugu people and advocated forming a closer bond between the government and the common people, going into the elections with the slogan, Telugu Vari Atma Gauravam (lit. Telugu people's self-respect).

The AP Legislative assembly election was held on 5 January 1983, two months ahead of schedule, The TDP, with its alliance partner SVM, won a landslide victory by winning 202 out of the 294 seats in the state assembly, with Rao himself winning both the seats he contested. In all legislative assembly elections, he used to contest from two or three seats and won in all such contests, except for the loss from Kalwakurthy in 1989 as detailed in the table below.

Election results
| Year | Office | Constituency | Party | Votes | % | Opponent | Party | Votes | % | Result | Ref |
|---|---|---|---|---|---|---|---|---|---|---|---|
| 1983 | MLA | Tirupati | Telugu Desam Party | 64,688 | 77.01 | Agarala Eswara Reddy | Indian National Congress | 17,809 | 21.2 | Won | |
| 1983 | MLA | Gudivada | Telugu Desam Party | 53906 | 64.94 | Katari Satyanarayan Rao | Indian National Congress | 27368 | 32.97 | Won | |
| 1985 | MLA | Gudivada | Telugu Desam Party | 49,600 | 53.64 | Uppalapati Suryanarayana Babu | Indian National Congress | 42,003 | 45.42 | Won | |
| 1985 | MLA | Hindupur | Telugu Desam Party | 56,599 | 75.64 | E. Adimurty | Indian National Congress | 16,070 | 21.48 | Won | |
| 1985 | MLA | Nalgonda | Telugu Desam Party | 49,788 | 66.54 | Mandadi Ramchandra Reddy | Indian National Congress | 18,201 | 24.32 | Won | |
| 1989 | MLA | Kalwakurthy | Telugu Desam Party | 50,786 | 47.59 | Chittaranjan Dass | Indian National Congress | 54,354 | 50.94 | Lost | |
| 1989 | MLA | Hindupur | Telugu Desam Party | 63,715 | 61.6 | G. Soma Sekhar | Indian National Congress | 39,720 | 38.4 | Won | |
| 1994 | MLA | Hindupur | Telugu Desam Party | 88,058 | 74.04 | J. C. Prabhakar Reddy | Indian National Congress | 28,008 | 23.55 | Won | |
| 1994 | MLA | Tekkali | Telugu Desam Party | 66,200 | 70.9 | Vajja Babu Rao | Indian National Congress | 25,310 | 27.1 | Won | |

== Chief Ministership ==
=== First term as Chief Minister ===
Rao was sworn in as the 10th and the first non-Congress Chief Minister of the state on 9 January 1983 with ten cabinet ministers and five ministers of state. After one year in office, NTR became known for populist schemes such as subsidised rice at Rs 2 per kg to the poor through public distribution system. He also went about dismantling established political setup such as recommending dissolution of legislative council, dismantling hereditary part time village officers and reducing the retirement age for government employees. Several of his actions in an authoritative manner caused resentment among several interest groups. In particular government employees strike against reducing retirement age lasted 19 days.

NTR visited the US for treatment of his health issues during June and July 1984 without nominating an in-charge. He underwent open heart surgery during his second visit. N. Bhaskar Rao, who initiated the idea of regional party and thought he could wield power from behind realised that he was sidelined. Rao engineered a split in the party making use of MLAs who were impacted by the authoritarian rule of NTR. After returning from US, NTR came to know about the actions of Bhaskar Rao and recommended his dismissal to governor to from the cabinet. Meanwhile Bhaskar Rao and three other ministers resigned from the cabinet. Bhaskar Rao met governor and claimed that NTR lost the majority in the house and he had the support of MLAs from the TDP and also from other parties to be able to form the government. Governor of Andhra Pradesh Thakur Ram Lal, sought NTR's resignation claiming that he lost his majority in the house. Despite NTR's immediate response to prove his majority by producing the MLAs, Ram Lal dismissed NTR's government and invited Bhaskar Rao to form the government and prove his majority in 30 days.

During this term, he brought together 14 non Congress(I) parties during Mahanadu held at Vijayawada in May 1983. The meeting called for review of centre-state relations. Subsequent such meetings held in New delhi, Srinagar, Calcutta helped NTR emerge as one of the prominent leaders at the national level.

=== Fight for democracy restoration ===
Peeved by the unilateral decision of governor in dismissing his government, without giving him a chance to prove his majority, Rama Rao relaunched his Chaitanya Ratham campaign, this time campaigning for the restoration of democracy by mobilising the support of people and various anti-Congress political parties in the country including the Janata Party (JP), the Bharatiya Janata Party (BJP), and the National Conference (NC). During the one-month crisis, the MLAs supporting Rama Rao were secured in a secret place to avoid horse-trading. This was achieved with the support of Ramakrishna Hegde, Janata party chief minister of the neighbouring Karnataka state. Ramakrishna Hegde moved all the TDP MLAs to a budget hotel, Das Prakash, in Mysuru (Mysore), as Congress was known for poaching MLAs. This was the first time in Indian politics that MLAs were secured at a safe place from poaching. Also, due to mobilisation of several political parties and the people and widespread publicity by press, Indira Gandhi unwillingly removed governor Ramlal and appointed a Congress veteran, Shankar Dayal Sharma, to pave the way for restoring Rao. Sharma put pressure on Nadendla to prove his majority as quickly as possible. The assembly was convened on 11 September 1984, four days ahead of deadline. TDP MLAs returned to Hyderabad a day before the session to participate in the assembly. During the three days, the house was forced to be adjourned as the pro Bhaskar Rao MLAs and MIM MLAs shouted slogans abusing NTR and caused unrest. The pro team speaker resigned. Bandhs were observed in the state and a Bharat bandh was also called by the national non congress(I) parties which rallied behind NTR.

=== Second term as Chief Minister ===
1984 Indian general election results

On 16 September, governor invited NTR to form a government as Bhaskar Rao could not prove his majority in the house. NTR was sworn in along with eight ministers was sworn in at the Raj Bhavan. On 20 September, the first day of assembly session, NTR proved his majority with support from communist parties, BJP and Janata party. NTR was unable to function like in the past, as he did not have absolute majority of his own. He also did not revoke the reinstatement of retirement age for government employees done by his predecessor Nadendla Bhaskar Rao during his short stint.

Meanwhile Indira Gandhi was assassinated and was succeeded as prime minister by her son, Rajiv Gandhi in November 1984. NTR wanted to go for mid term polls and got an assurance from Rajiv Gandhi on the condition that he will not campaign outside his state in the upcoming national elections. On 23 November 1984, NTR's cabinet recommended dissolution of the assembly which was accepted by the governor. In the ensuing national elections to the Lok Sabha in December 1984, the Congress, riding on the sympathy wave caused by Indira Gandhi's assassination, won convincingly all over the country except in Andhra Pradesh where the TDP secured a landslide victory. TDP became the first regional party to serve as the main opposition party in the Lok Sabha.

The TDP again won with a massive majority in mid term elections held in March 1985, bagging 202 out of 250 seats it contested. Rao won from all the 3 seats that he contested namely Hindupur, Nalgonda and Gudivada. Senior Leaders of the Congress in the state including former Chief Ministers Kasu Brahmananda Reddy and Kotla Vijaya Bhaskara Reddy lost in the election. Nadendla Bhaskar Rao's splinter party only won two seats.

=== Third term as Chief Minister ===
Rao was sworn in as the chief minister on 9 March 1985. During this term, he altered rural power structures by creating 1104 revenue mandals in place of 305 talukas to decentralise the rural administration and make it more efficient. Direct elections for local bodies with reservations for 50% of seats for including 20% for backward classes for the first time on a party basis were held. The bill to introduce equal rights to daughters in inheritance became an act on 10 October 1985 much before such change at the national level in 2005. He banned alcohol sale.He started the practice of registering house site pattas in the name of women and special courts for crimes against women. He transformed Hyderabad into a distinctly Telugu city, by launching Tank bund project and launching the Hussain Sagar Buddha project. He announced political reservations for BCs with 20% quota in mandals. He decided to implement increased reservations from 49 per cent to 71 per cent based on the recommendation N.K. Muralidhar Rao commission and also impose a creamy layer criteria to exclude the well off. However this was challenged in the courts which resulted in annulling the GO.

Several congress leaders and activists tried to stall several initiatives of NTR by filing petitions in courts and courts passed strictures on some. He also revived his film making and acting while the state faced several crisis such as naxal crisis, social conflicts due to increase in reservations, caste conflicts in Vijaywada and Karamchedu. In the December 1989 assembly elections however, he was voted out of power due to a wave of anti-incumbency sweeping the state as a result of which the Congress returned to power.

=== Fourth term as Chief Minister ===
Rao was sworn in as the chief minister for the fourth and final time in a ceremony at Lal Bahadur Stadium in the presence of non- Congress(I) party leaders including then-Tamil Nadu chief minister and his former flim star J. Jayalalithaa. He signed the file to impose total alcohol prohibition in the event to a applause from the crowd, fulfilling his election promise. Though NTR rewarded Chandrababu with cabinet minister for finance and revenue which are considered as plum posts, he denied berths to some of his loyalists. Lakshmi Parvati's increasing influence by accompanying NTR in his travels and her individual public appearances in cultural and social functions in which several ministers participated troubled several TDP leaders. Unhappy TDP MLAs congregated in hotel Viceroy and engaged in discussions about future course of action. Few representatives met NTR and asked him to assure to keep Lakshmi Parvathi out of politics, which was declined. Aware of the role of Chandrababu, NTR recommended the dismissal of him and his loyalists from the cabinet to the governor which was accepted. With the support of NTR's son Harikrishna and son-in-law Daggubati to dethrone NTR, MLAs elected N. Chandrababu Naidu as the leader of the legislature party. A final attempt by NTR to bring back the rebel MLAs to his fold turned futile. While NTR requested the governor to dissolve the assembly. Meanwhile representative from Chandrababu's faction informed governor of change of leadership of TDP legislature party with the requisite support of MLAs. Governor asked NTR to resign. Finally NTR resigned after 8 and half months of his being sworn in. Following this Chandrababu staked his claim to form the government and was sworn in as the Chief minister on 1 September 1995.

Following this, NTR vowed to take revenge against Naidu in an interview with Reuters on 17 January 1996. NTR died the next day. Lakshmi Parvathi's faction formed a new party NTR Telugu Desam Party, and participated in the 1996 Lok Sabha elections but could not win a single seat. However she won in the by-election to the legislative assembly from Pathapatnam in October 1996. The party could not win any in the later elections.

== As leader of the opposition ==
Rao assumed the position as the Leader of Opposition in the state. He felt dejected and unwanted by the proceedings in the assembly in which he was belittled by the Congress MLAs who were earlier MLAs of his party. He found solace in movie making. He completed the remaining shooting for Brahmarshi Viswamitra and took up and completed films on Srinatha, Telugu poet and Ashok, the emperor. All the three failed at the box office. Lakshmi Parvathi who met him during a Harikatha performance of his husband at AP Bhavan in 1985. She sought his permission to write his biography and persisted despite initial rejections from Rao. During 1991, he relented and Lakshmi Parvati started meeting him regularly. She cared for him during his campaigning for mid term election. she also started living away from her husband. According to Parvathi, NTR asked her to be his companion. Parvathi accepted his proposal and filed for divorce from her husband. According to Parvathi, they got married on 22 February 1992 secretly in the puja room of NTR's kuteeram at Ramakrishna Studios, Nacharam. She appeared in public when Rao suffered paralytic stroke and was admitted to NIMS. He visited US again for treatment. He was cared for by Parvathi after returning. NTR's family members attempts to separate them proved futile. As rumours spread about his life with Parvathi, he put a lid on them by sharing his relationship with Parvathi and proposing to her in public, during the 100th day celebration of film Major Chandrakaanth on 10 September 1993. Surprisingly, the relationship was well received by the public.

Several non Congress(I) parties came together to form National Front on 6 August 1988 largely due to the efforts of NTR. He became its Chairman. He campaigned extensively for the constituent parties using his Chaitanya Ratham campaigning concept. This alliance governed India between 1989 and 1990 with support from the BJP. He could not play an active influential role, as his party is represented by just two MPs in Lok Sabha. As National front government fell before the completion of one year, mid term elections took place in May 1991 in two phases. Due to the sympathy wave for Rajiv Gandhi, who was killed during the electioneering, TDP increased its tally to 13 seats, while Congress won 25 seats. He was happy to see PV Narasimha Rao, a Telugu elected as prime minister of the coalition government. He decided not to field a TDP candidate when PV Narasimha rao contested in the Nandyal By-election subsequently. He faced split in his parliamentary party, when opposition parties brought about a no confidence motion against Narasimha Rao government.

When all TDP MLAs who were demanding action against daylight murder of their colleague in Hyderabad rushed into the well of the house, they were suspended by the speaker. This made NTR take a vow to return to the assembly only as the chief minister.

To energise the party cadre, Rao started organising regional meetings. During the first such meeting at Rajahmundry meeting, the audience wanted Parvathi to speak after the address by NTR. Her speech made a good impression. Though she did not express any political aspirations, her increasing clout made family members and specially Chandrababu unhappy. Some members who did not get along well with Chandrababu, became close to her. The historic anti-arrack agitation by women across the state became a threat to the Congress government. Though the government ordered a ban from 1 October 1993, NTR promised total ban including Indian Made Foreign Liquor, once he comes to power. NTR reduced his roadshows during the campaigns for December 1994 state assembly elections, due to his advancing age. Elections were held in two phases on 1 and 5 December 1994.

TDP in alliance with the Left Front won 269 seats in the 294 seat assembly, with the TDP alone winning 226. The Congress, which once again had multiple Chief Ministers in the state during its five-year rule between 1989 and 1994, won only 26 seats. Rao contested again from Hindupur and won the seat for the third consecutive time, achieving a rare hat-trick of wins from the same assembly constituency. He also won from another assembly constituency, Tekkali.

== Awards and honours ==
Rama Rao has received numerous honours and accolades, including the Padma Shri in 1968. He received an honorary Doctorate in 1978 from Andhra University. He also received three National Film Awards for co-producing Thodu Dongalu (1954) and Seetharama Kalyanam (1960) under National Art Theater, Madras, and for directing Varakatnam (1970). Rao garnered the Nandi Award for Best Actor for Kodalu Diddina Kapuram in 1970, and the Inaugural Filmfare Award for Best Actor – Telugu in 1972 for Badi Panthulu. He received Best Story Writer in 1974 for Tatamma Kala

== Legacy ==
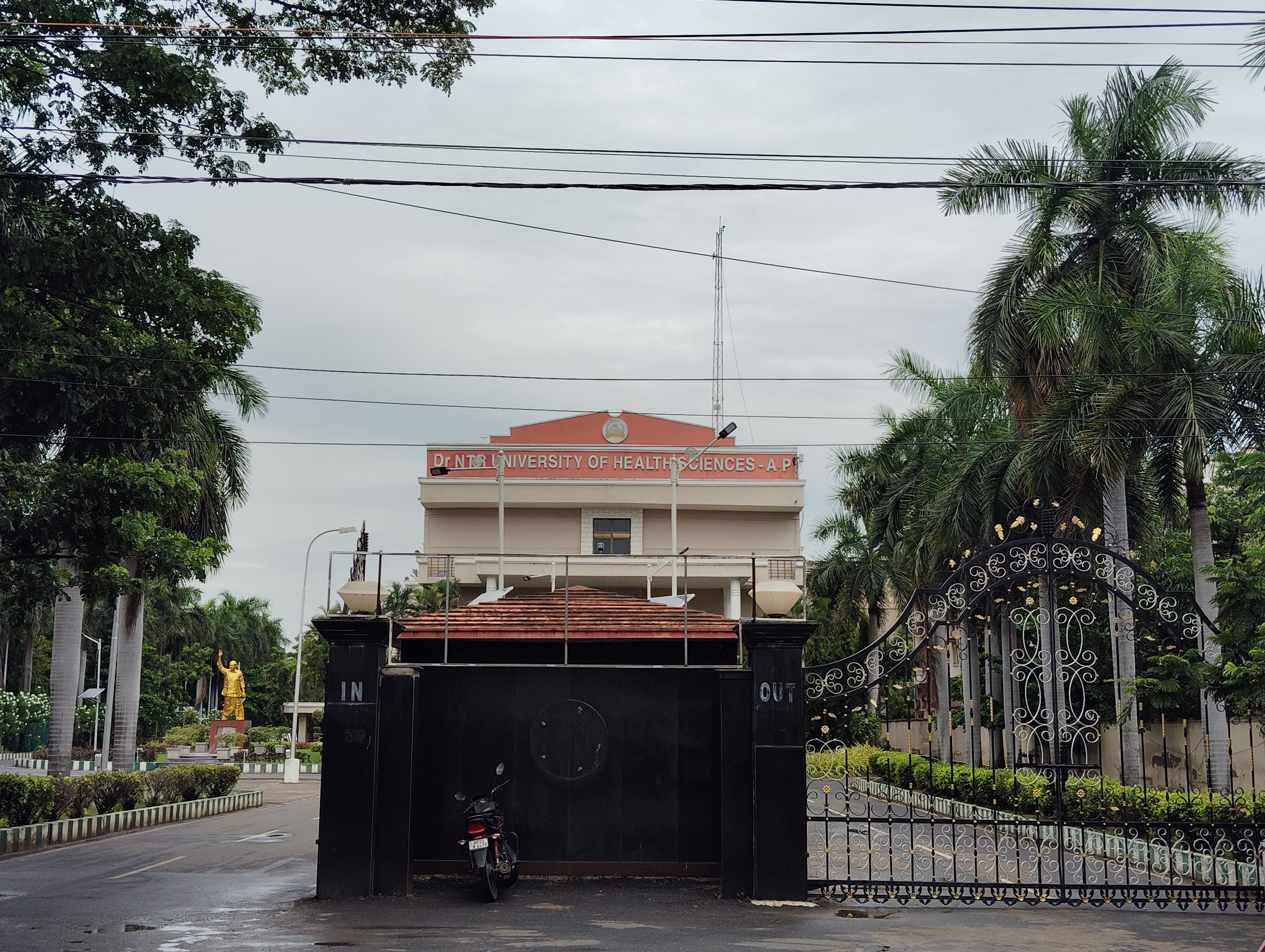
Entrance of Dr NTR University of Health Sciences

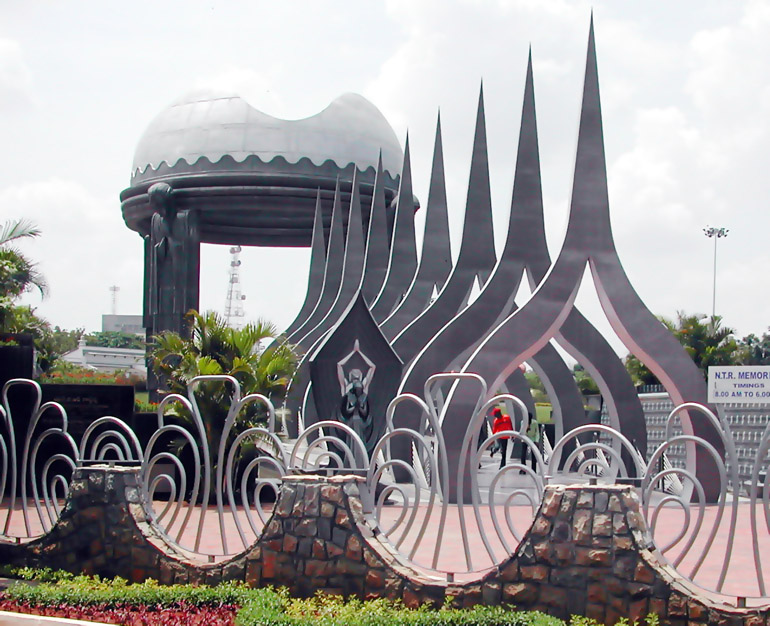
Rao's memorial at NTR Gardens, Hyderabad

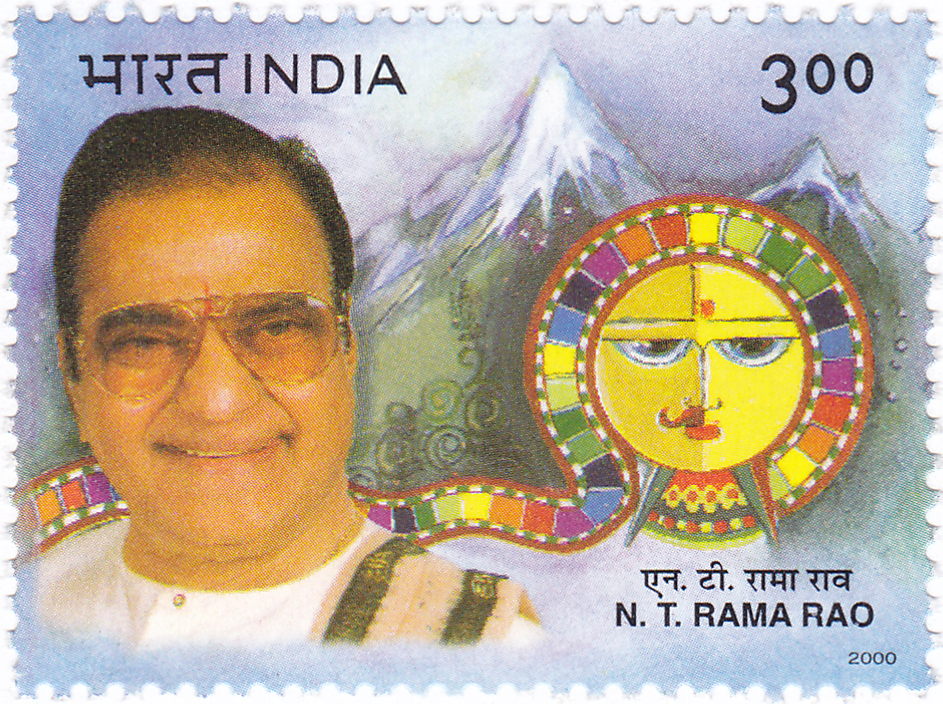
N. T. Rama Rao commemorative stamp released on 28 August 2000

The Government of Andhra Pradesh instituted NTR National Award in 1996 to recognise notable film personalities for their lifetime achievements and contributions to the Indian film industry. University of Health Sciences, inaugurated on 9 April 1986 by NTR was renamed in his honour on 2 February 1998 following his death. NTR Memorial developed on a 5 acre plot, part of the 55 acre NTR garden overlooking Hussain Sagar Lake was inaugurated by N. Chandrababu Naidu on 30 May 1999. A postal stamp was released on 28 May 2000 in his honour. In 2017, a 9.3 foot bronze statue of NTR was unveiled by Meira Kumar, former Speaker of Lok Sabha, at the Parliament of India. Droupadi Murmu, President of India released a ₹100 commemorative coin featuring N.T. Rama Rao at the Rashtrapati Bhavan in New Delhi on 28 August 2023.

NTR Memorial Trust, a non profit founded by N. Chandrababu Naidu is engaged in social service. The NTR National Literary Award was instituted by the NTR Vignan Trust, founded by Lakshmi Parvathi is an annual award to recognise people for their lifetime achievements and contributions to Indian literature. In 2022, Krishna district was bifurcated to form NTR district, which was named after him.

== In popular culture ==
NTR's son Nandamuri Balakrishna portrayed him in the films N.T.R: Kathanayakudu covering his acting career and N.T.R: Mahanayakudu covering his political rule till he is restored as chief minister in 1984 following a political coup. NTR was portrayed by P. Vijay Kumar in the Ram Gopal Varma film Lakshmi's NTR which covers the events in Lakshmi Parvathi's life with NTR. Kumar portrayed NTR once again in a very brief appearance in The Paradise (2026).

Lakshmi Parvati authored two-volume biography of NTR. The first volume, Eduruleni Manishi (transl. Unstoppable person), covers his childhood and his entry into films. The second volume, Telugu Tejam (transl. The radiance of Telugu), dealt with his political career. Ramesh Kandula, K. Ramachandra Murti and I. Venkat Rao were some of the authors of books on NTR.

== See also ==
- NTR district, district of Andhra Pradesh named after him
- NTR Gardens, memorial dedicated to him in Hyderabad
- NTR bus station
- List of chief ministers of Andhra Pradesh

Political offices
| Preceded by Kotla Vijaya Bhaskara Reddy | Chief Minister of Andhra Pradesh; 1983–1984 | Succeeded by Nadendla Bhaskara Rao |
| Preceded by Nadendla Bhaskara Rao | Chief Minister of Andhra Pradesh; 1984–1989 | Succeeded by Marri Chenna Reddy |
| Preceded by Kotla Vijaya Bhaskara Reddy | Chief Minister of Andhra Pradesh; 1994–1995 | Succeeded by Nara Chandrababu Naidu |
