= Bobbili (disambiguation) =

Bobbili is the historical town in Vizianagaram district, Andhra Pradesh, India.

It may also refer to:

- Bobbili (Lok Sabha constituency), an Indian parliamentary constituency
- Battle of Bobbili, 18th-century battle fought between Bobbili and Vizianagaram kingdoms
- Bobbili Estate, a zamindari started in 1652
- Bobbili Brahmanna, a 1984 Indian Telugu-language film
- Bobbili Puli, a 1982 Indian Telugu-language film
- Bobbili Raja, a 1990 Indian Telugu-language film by B. Gopal
- Bobbili Yudham, a 1964 Indian Telugu-language historical film

== See also ==
- Bobili, Ouham, Central African Republic
