= Koppula Velama =

Indian caste from Andhra Pradesh

- Classification: Naidu Rao
- Religions: Hinduism
- Languages: Telugu
- Populated states: Andhra Pradesh, Telangana

Koppula Velama or Koppu Velama is a Telugu caste that inhabits the Indian state of Andhra Pradesh. They are primarily found in the Uttarandhra region with smaller populations in other districts. They are a Hindu community, traditionally associated with farming and military, and often use the title "Naidu" and "Rao". The caste name is added to the Other Backward Class from OC category by the Government of Andhra Pradesh in 1972 due to severe draught and regional backwardness under the leadership of Velama chief minister Jalagam Vengala Rao .They are politically well-represented in the Uttarandhra region. Koppu or Koppula Velamas are a kindred group to Pollinati Velama caste who also live in Uttarandhra. Koppula and pollinati Velama are Forward/ OC castes in Telangana.

== Etymology ==
The name originated from the practice of men tying their hair on their heads in the form of a knot, known in Telugu as Koppu (కొప్పు).

== History ==
Subcaste of Velama caste.The 1757 Battle of Bobbili catalyzed a massive, post-conflict migration and reorganization of the Velama community, leading to the formation of distinct regional sub-groups known as Pollinati and Koppula.The total destruction of the Bobbili fort led to a diaspora. Many families fled to neighboring godavari, Krishna, Telangana regions to escape the influence of the French (Bussey) Marquis de Bussy-Castelnau and the Raja of Vizianagaram.This upheaval further created a social stratification between landowning elite and those focused on agriculture, with these distinctions still impacting social, political, and matrimonial contexts today.Post-war 1757 Battle of Bobbili, the gap widened between the "Padmanayaka" Velamas (who held onto titles and land) and the "Koppula/Polinati" Velama, who focused more on agriculture and local trade.

== Lack of Liquid-Gold (Water) ==
Velama community's shift from prosperity to hardship is a classic example of regional vs community backwardness.

Historically, their status was tied to land ownership. Sir Arthur Cotton built the Dowleswaram Barrage (1852) cost of roughly 17.5 lakh rupees transformed over 7–10 lakh acres into fertile land in Godavari districts and Prakasam Barrage Krishna (1855) barrages cost of 2 crore rupees irrigated 5.8 lakh acres turning Krishna and Guntur areas to fertile and rich lands, turned into "Green Belts", making water the new "Liquid Gold". Communities living in these areas such as Raju Reddy Kamma (caste) Kapu (caste) and other castes hugely benefited from these barrages, economically and educationally.

However, Velamas living outside these irrigated zones-specifically in the upland and rain-fed areas were left behind 175 years. Without access to this "Liquid Gold", their lands became unproductive, leading to a cycle of poverty, famine, draught, limited educational access and entrepreneurship. Their struggle is not due to traditional social standing, but rather geographic exclusion from the 19th-century irrigation revolution (1850s) and 20th century Nagarjuna Sagar Dam built in 1967 benefited 10 lakh acres in Guntur, prakasam, Nalgonda and Suryapet.

== Notables ==
- Devulapalli Peddanna Tandra Paparayudu's soldier assisted in killing of Battle of Bobbili
- Buddaraju Venkaiah Tandra Paparayudu's soldier assisted in killing of Battle of Bobbili
- Vasireddy Krishnamurthy Naidu Minister of Andhra Pradesh & Icon of community, Built irrigation projects and provided state governments.
- Puri Jagannadh
- Kinjarapu Yerran Naidu
- Chintakayala Ayyanna Patrudu
- Parasuram
- Shiva Nirvana
- Sabbam Hari
- Bandaru Satyanarayana Murthy
- Kolla Lalitha
- Gavireddi Rama Naidu
- Reddy Satyanarayana
- Sambangi ChinnaAappalaNaidu
- Gandi Babji
- Paila AppalaNaidu
- Budi Mutyala Naidu
- Vechalalu Srirammurthy
- Vasireddy varadaramarao
- Kolla AppalaNaidu
- C. M. Ramesh
- Kinjarapu Atchannaidu
- Kinjarapu Ram Mohan Naidu
- R. Narayana Murthy
- Dharmana Prasada Rao
- Vamshi Paidipally.
