= List of 1986 films based on actual events =

This is a list of films and miniseries released in 1986 that are based on actual events. All films on this list are from American production unless indicated otherwise.

== 1986 ==
- A Case of Deadly Force (1986) – drama television film about a 1975 cover-up of an unjustified shooting of a black man by two white members of the Boston Tactical Unit – based on a true story
- A Fortunate Life (1986) – Australian biographical historical drama miniseries depicting Albert Facey's early life in Western Australia, his experiences as a private during the Gallipoli campaign of World War I and his return to civilian life after the war
- A Winner Never Quits (1986) – family biographical drama television film based on the true story of baseball player Pete Gray, the first one-armed man ever to play major league baseball, hired in 1943 as a "freak attraction" and wartime morale-booster by the Memphis Chicks, Class-A minor league ball club
- Act of Vengeance (1986) – biographical crime drama television film about the corruption that occurred during the United Mine Workers' presidential elections in 1969
- Alex: The Life of a Child (1986) – biographical drama television film about the life and death of Alexandra Deford from cystic fibrosis
- Amorosa (1986) – Swedish biographical drama film based on the life of writer Agnes von Krusenstjerna, detailing her sexually charged and often turbulent relationship with David Sprengel
- Anastasia: The Mystery of Anna (1986) – American-Austrian-Italian biographical drama television film loosely based on the story of Grand Duchess Anastasia Nikolaevna of Russia
- At Close Range (1986) – neo-noir crime drama film based on the real life rural Pennsylvania crime family led by Bruce Johnston Sr. which operated during the 1960s and '70s
- Barefoot Gen 2 (Japanese: はだしのゲン2) (1986) – Japanese war drama film based three years after the Hiroshima bombing, a teenager helps a group of orphans to survive and find their new life
- Boundaries of Time: Caspar David Friedrich (German: Caspar David Friedrich. Grenzen der Zeit) (1986) – West German biographical drama film about the painter Caspar David Friedrich and set immediately after his death, portraying him through his family and friends
- The Boy in Blue (1986) – Canadian biographical sport drama film based on the life of Ned Hanlan, the late-19th century Canadian sculler and world champion
- Call Me Mr. Brown (1986) – Australian crime film based on the 1971 Qantas bomb hoax
- Caravaggio (1986) – British historical drama film depicting a fictionalised retelling of the life of Baroque painter Michelangelo Merisi da Caravaggio
- Castaway (1986) – British biographical drama film telling of Lucy Irvine's experiences of staying for a year with writer Gerald Kingsland on the isolated island of Tuin, between New Guinea and Australia
- The Climb (1986) – Canadian-British adventure drama film depicting a dramatization of mountaineer Hermann Buhl's 1953 attempt to climb Nanga Parbat
- Comrades (1986) – British historical drama film depicting the story of the Tolpuddle Martyrs, who were arrested and transported to Australia in 1834 for trying to improve their conditions by forming an early form of trade union
- Death of a Soldier (1986) – Australian historical crime film dramatizing the case of Eddie Leonski, an American soldier stationed in Australia who committed a string a serial killings in May 1942
- The Deliberate Stranger (1986) – crime thriller miniseries about American serial killer Ted Bundy
- The Delta Force (1986) – action drama film based on the real life U.S. Army Delta Force unit
- Dreams of Gold: The Mel Fisher Story (1986) – drama television film based on the actual adventures of Treasure Hunter Mel Fisher
- Dream West (1986) – biographical Western drama miniseries based on the life of 19th century explorer and politician John C. Frémont
- Easy Prey (1986) – Canadian historical biographical drama television film reenacting the true story of Australian serial killer Christopher Wilder, also known as "the Beauty Queen Killer", and his kidnapping of victim Tina Marie Risico, a sixteen-year-old girl
- The George McKenna Story (1986) – biographical drama television film involving the events at George Washington Preparatory High School in South Los Angeles
- George Washington II: The Forging of a Nation (1986) – historical biographical drama television film chronicling the life of George Washington, the first President of the United States
- God's Outlaw (1986) – British historical biographical drama film depicting the historical figure of William Tyndale and his struggles with the authorities in the time of Henry VIII for translating the Bible into English
- Gone to Texas (1986) – biographical drama television film about Sam Houston's years as Governor of Tennessee through his involvement in the Texas Revolution
- Heartburn (1986) – comedy romantic drama film based on Nora Ephron's marriage to Carl Bernstein
- Henry: Portrait of a Serial Killer (1986) – psychological crime drama film loosely based on convicted real life serial killers Henry Lee Lucas and Ottis Toole
- Hoosiers (1986) – sport drama film inspired by the Milan High School team who won the 1954 state championship
- Jo Jo Dancer, Your Life Is Calling (1986) – biographical comedy drama film paralleling many incidents and experiences in Richard Pryor's life
- Just Us (1986) – Australian romantic crime film based on the life of Gabrielle Carey and how she made the 'mistake' of falling in love with Terry Haley, a prison inmate at Parramatta Gaol
- The Killer is Still Among Us (Italian: L'assassino è ancora tra noi) (1986) – Italian crime horror film loosely based on the crimes of the Italian serial killer known as "the Monster of Florence"
- Lady Jane (1986) – British historical romantic drama film telling the story of Lady Jane Grey, her marriage to Lord Guildford Dudley, and her reign as the "Nine Days' Queen" following the death of Edward VI
- The Last Days of Frank and Jesse James (1986) – biographical Western drama television film depicting the various fortunes and misfortunes of the outlaws and bank robbers Frank and Jesse James
- The Last Days of Patton (1986) – biographical drama television film portraying the last few months of General George S. Patton's life
- Liberty (1986) – historical drama television film depicting a largely fictionalized account of the construction of the Statue of Liberty
- Lord Mountbatten: The Last Viceroy (1986) – British biographical drama miniseries depicting Lord Mountbatten's time as Supreme Commander, South-East Asia in the Second World War, and then as Viceroy of India shortly after the war in the days leading up to Indian independence
- The Man in the Black Cape (Portuguese: O Homem da Capa Preta) (1986) – Brazilian crime drama film portraying the life of Tenório Cavalcanti, a Duque de Caxias politician who used to carry a machine gun dubbed "Lurdinha" with him
- The Mission (1986) – British historical drama film about the experiences of a Jesuit missionary in 18th-century South America
- The Moro Affair (Italian: Il caso Moro) (1986) – Italian crime drama film about the kidnapping of Aldo Moro in 1978
- Murrow (1986) – American-British biographical drama television film following the life of legendary news reporter Edward R. Murrow; from his radio broadcasts from the rooftops of London during the Blitz to his TV documentary series "See It Now" and his confrontations with the Senator from Wisconsin that helped put an end to the witch-hunts
- Nazi Hunter: The Beate Klarsfeld Story (1986) – biographical drama television film telling the true story on the life of Beate Klarsfeld, a German who documented the actions that took place during the Holocaust
- Night of the Pencils (Spanish: La noche de los lápices) (1986) – Argentine historical drama film based on the actual events recorded in history as the "Night of the pencils" (La noche de los lápices), telling the story of seven students who, after protesting for lower bus fares for students in the city of La Plata, were abducted in September 1976, during Argentina's last dictatorship (1976–1983), and subsequently disappeared
- Nobody's Child (1986) – drama television film based on the autobiographical account of the same title by Marie Balter who was sent to a mental institution aged sixteen
- On Wings of Fire (1986) – Indian historical biographical drama film recounting the history of Zoroastrianism and prophet Zarathushtra, covering a period of 3500 years of the Zoroastrians and the Parsees of India
- Palay Khan (Hindi: पलय खान) (1986) – Indian Hindi-language action thriller film about the life of Palay Khan
- Peter the Great (1986) – biographical historical drama miniseries chronicling the life of Peter I of Russia; from childhood in 1682 to the Great Northern War against Sweden during the 1700s
- The Professor (Italian: Il camorrista) (1986) – Italian neo-noir crime drama film based on the true story of the Italian crime boss Raffaele Cutolo
- River's Edge (1986) – crime drama film partially based on the 1981 murder of Marcy Renee Conrad in Milpitas, California
- Romanza final (1986) – Spanish biographical drama film about opera singer Julián Gayarre
- Rosa Luxemburg (1986) – West German biographical historical drama film telling the story of Rosa Luxemburg, Karl Liebknecht, and Leo Jogiches who formed a revolutionary German party, the Spartacists
- Salvador (1986) – war drama film telling the story of an American journalist covering the Salvadoran Civil War who becomes entangled with both the FMLN and the right-wing military dictatorship while trying to rescue his girlfriend and her children
- Samaritan: The Mitch Snyder Story (1986) – drama television film about Mitch Snyder, a Washington crusader for the homeless, who took his case to Congress
- The Sea and Poison (Japanese: 海と毒薬) (1986) – Japanese drama film telling the true story of downed American pilots in World War II who are vivisected by Japanese surgeons in medical experiments at Unit 731
- Second Serve (1986) – biographical sport drama television film about retired eye surgeon, professional tennis player, and transgender woman Renée Richards
- Shaka Zulu (1986) – South African action drama miniseries focusing on the rise of the Zulu, and their leader, Shaka, his wars, and the British administration
- Sid and Nancy (1986) – British biographical drama film portraying the life of Sid Vicious, bassist of the punk rock band the Sex Pistols, and his destructive relationship with girlfriend Nancy Spungen
- Stalin's Disciples (Hebrew: ילדי סטאלין) (1986) – Israeli biographical drama film satirizing the utopian ideology of the Israeli kibbutz
- Stammheim (1986) – West German crime drama film telling the story of the trial in the court of Stammheim Prison of the left-wing Baader-Meinhof Group
- Tandra Paparayudu (Telugu: తాండ్ర పాపారాయుడు) (1986) – Indian Telugu-language biographical war film based on the life of 18th century warrior Tandra Paparayudu, the General of Bobbili, and General Bussy
- Thérèse (1986) – French biographical drama film about the life of Saint Thérèse of Lisieux
- Welcome in Vienna (German: Wohin und zurück – Teil 3: Welcome in Vienna) (1986) – Austrian drama film loosely based on Georg Stefan Troller’s life as a Viennese Jew who fled Europe as a teenager, emigrated to the United States, and returned to Europe during World War II as an American soldier
- With My Hot Tears (German: Mit meinen heißen Tränen) (1986) – West German-Austrian-Swiss biographical drama film depicting the final years of the life of 19th century Austrian composer Franz Schubert
- The Wolf at the Door (Danish: Oviri; French: Gauguin, le loup dans le soleil) (1986) – Danish-French biographical drama film based on real life events of French artist Paul Gauguin, who was married to a Danish woman and lived in Copenhagen in the 1880s
- Women of Valor (1986) – war drama television film about a group of American Army nurses that are captured by the Japanese in April 1942 and put in a prisoner-of-war camp in Bataan
- Yuri Nosenko: Double Agent (1986) – American-British biographical drama television film telling the true-life story of Yuri Nosenko, a top Soviet KGB agent who defected to the West at the height of the Cold War in 1964
