= Pusapati =

Indian ruling clan

Poosapati / Pusapati was the ruling clan of the Vizianagaram estate.

== History ==
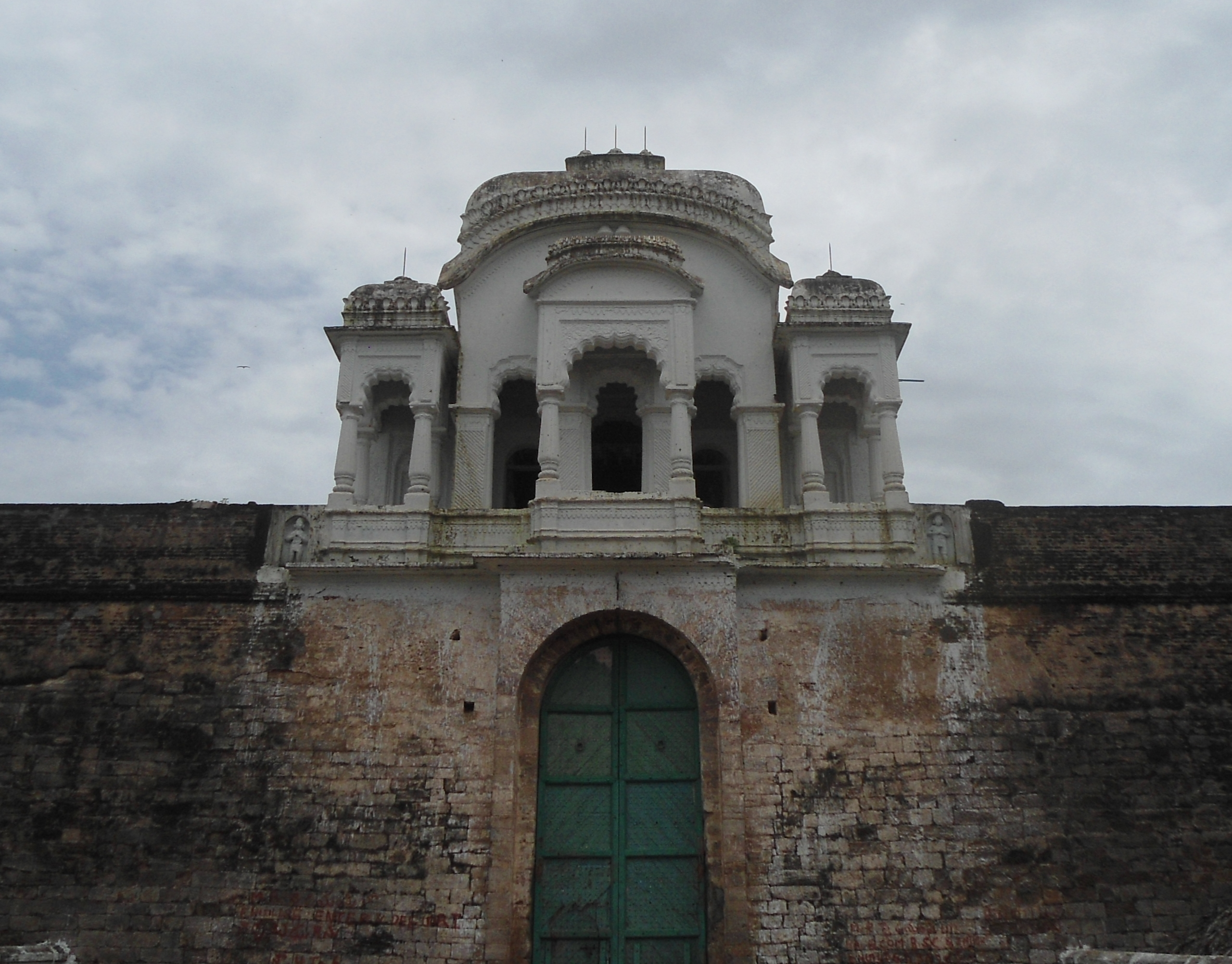
West Entrance of the Vizianagaram fort in Andhra Pradesh

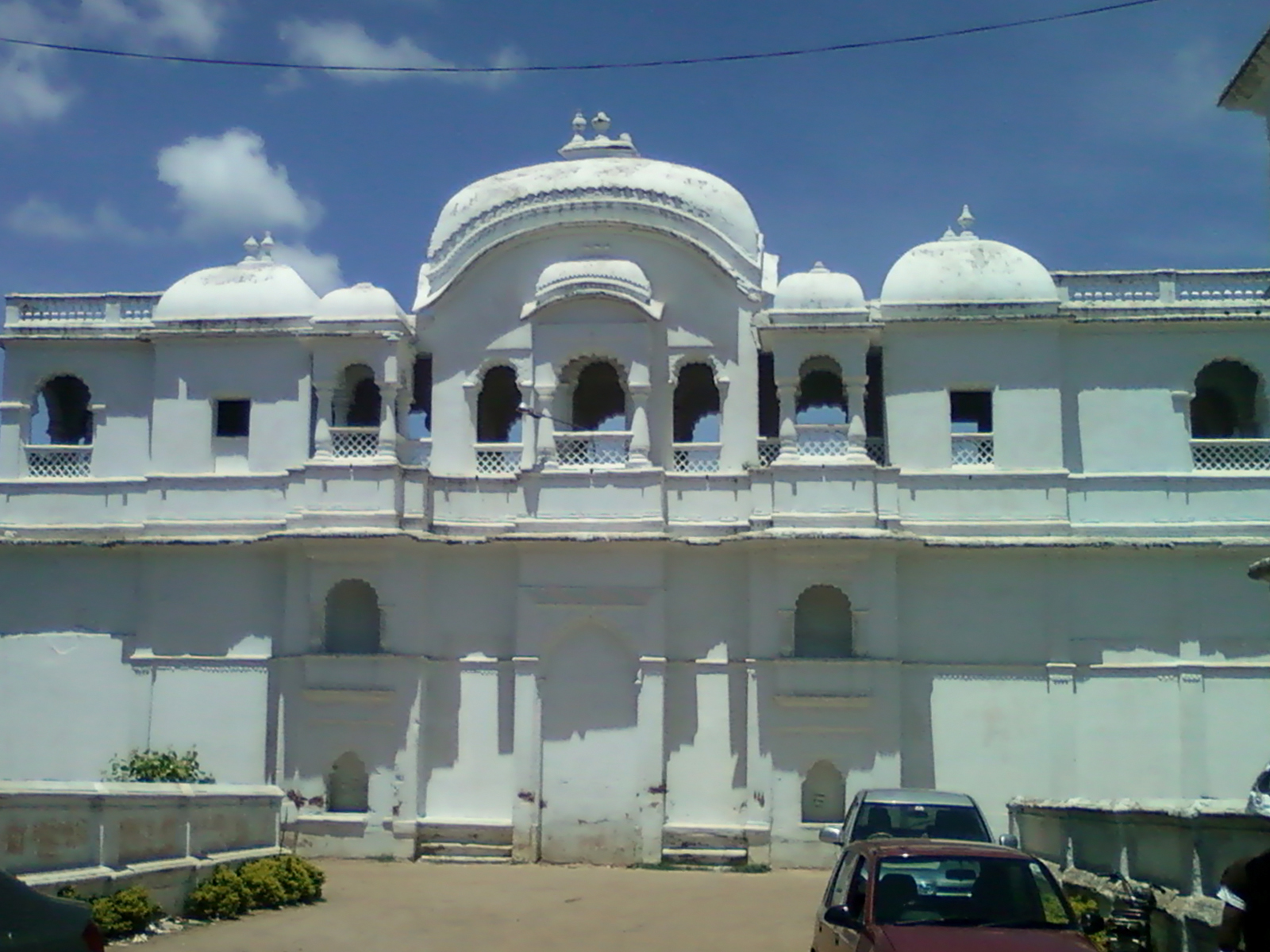
Main Entrance of Vizianagaram Fort

The Pusapati clan claims descent from Madhavavarma, who led a Kshatriya colony into the Krishna Valley in the late 6th century. The members of the colony subsequently held important positions at the court of Golcanda.

The Pusapati chieftain Sitaram Chandra Raju received the villages of Kumili and Gundredu from Raghunath Krishna Dev of the Jeypore Estate. Viziaram Raju was appointed as an administrative minister of the Jeypore Estate by Ram Chandra Dev I and succeeded his father as the head of the clan in 1710. Viziaram Raju occupied a portion of the coastal territories of the Jeypore Estate under Vishwambhar Dev II and moved the capital of the estate from Potnuru to Vizianagaram in 1712; he named the capital town after himself. Viziaram Raju prompted the neighboring landowners (zamindars) to secede and gain independence from the Jeypore Estate. In 1757, Viziaram Raju formed an alliance with Marquis de Bussy-Castelnau, which allowed him to seize the capital of the rival landowner of Bobbili.

Following Viziaram Raju, the Pusapati clan was led first by Ananda Raju and next by Viziaram Raju II, who was largely controlled by his half-brother Sitarama Raju. In 1761, Sitarama Raju attacked Parlakhemundi defeating its force and their Maratha allies further adding territory to the Vizianagaram Estate. In 1768, Viziaram Raju II claimed the right to hold and cultivate (patta) Kasipuram, Nandapur, Madgol, etc. with the support of and marking the increasing involvement of the British East India Company; this resulted in the dissatisfied landowners rising against Vizianagaram. As Viziaram Raju II was unable to make the requisite revenue collection payments, he was ordered to leave the district. He defied the orders, which resulted in the Battle of Padmanabham against the East India Company Madras Presidency forces led by Colonel Prendergast wherein Viziaram Raju II was defeated and slain.

Following the Battle of Padmanabham, Narayana Babu Raju was unable to quell the increasing revolts from the hill landowners, which ultimately led to further reductions of the Vizianagaram Estate. The successive chieftains Viziaram Gajapati Raju and Ananda Raju proved to be capable leaders and brought in a period of flourishing for the Vizianagaram Estate.

The Pusapatis obtained the title of Gajapati after the battle of Nandapur.

Pusapadu is a village in erstwhile Guntur district.

== Pusapati rulers ==
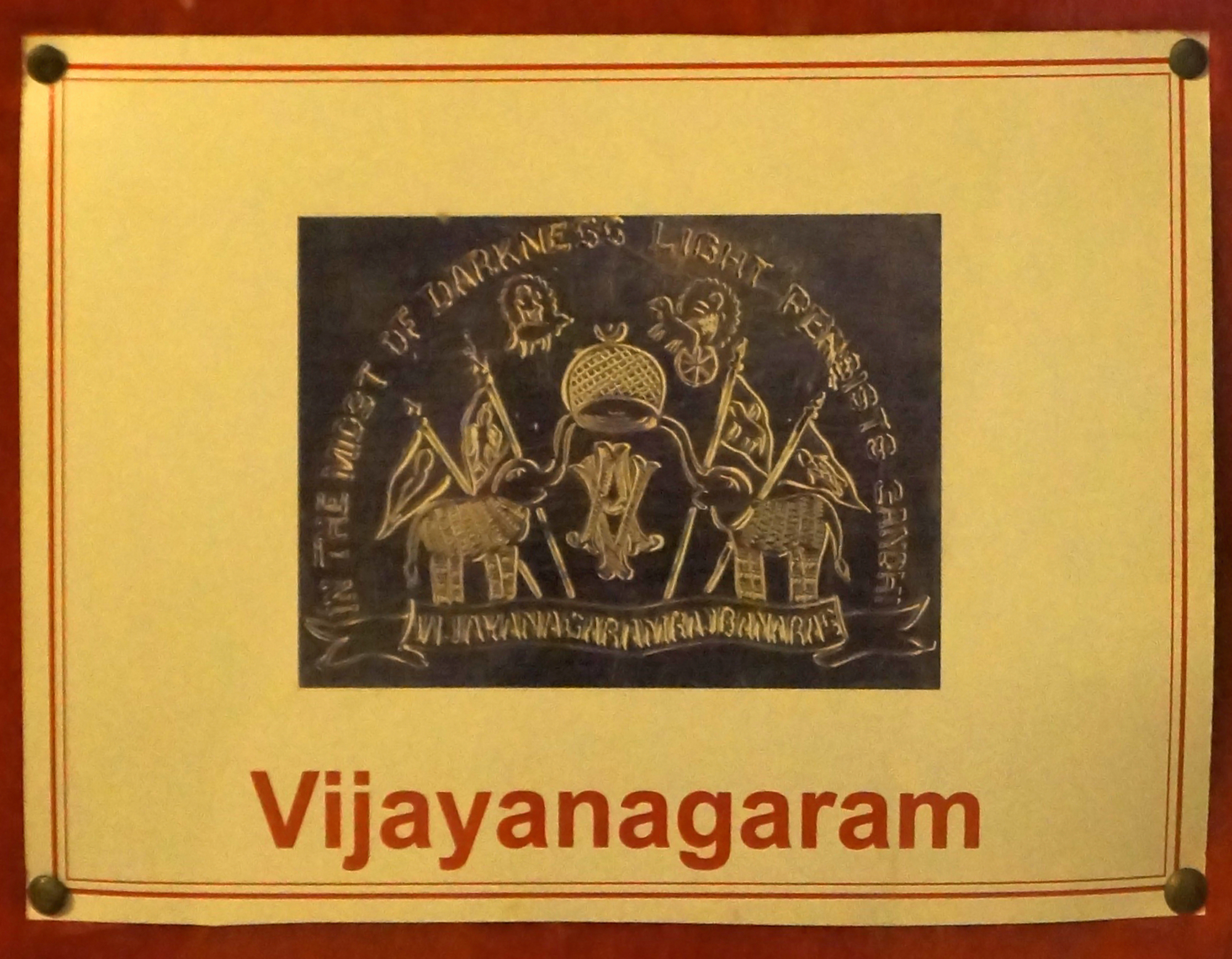
Coat of Arms of Vijayanagaram

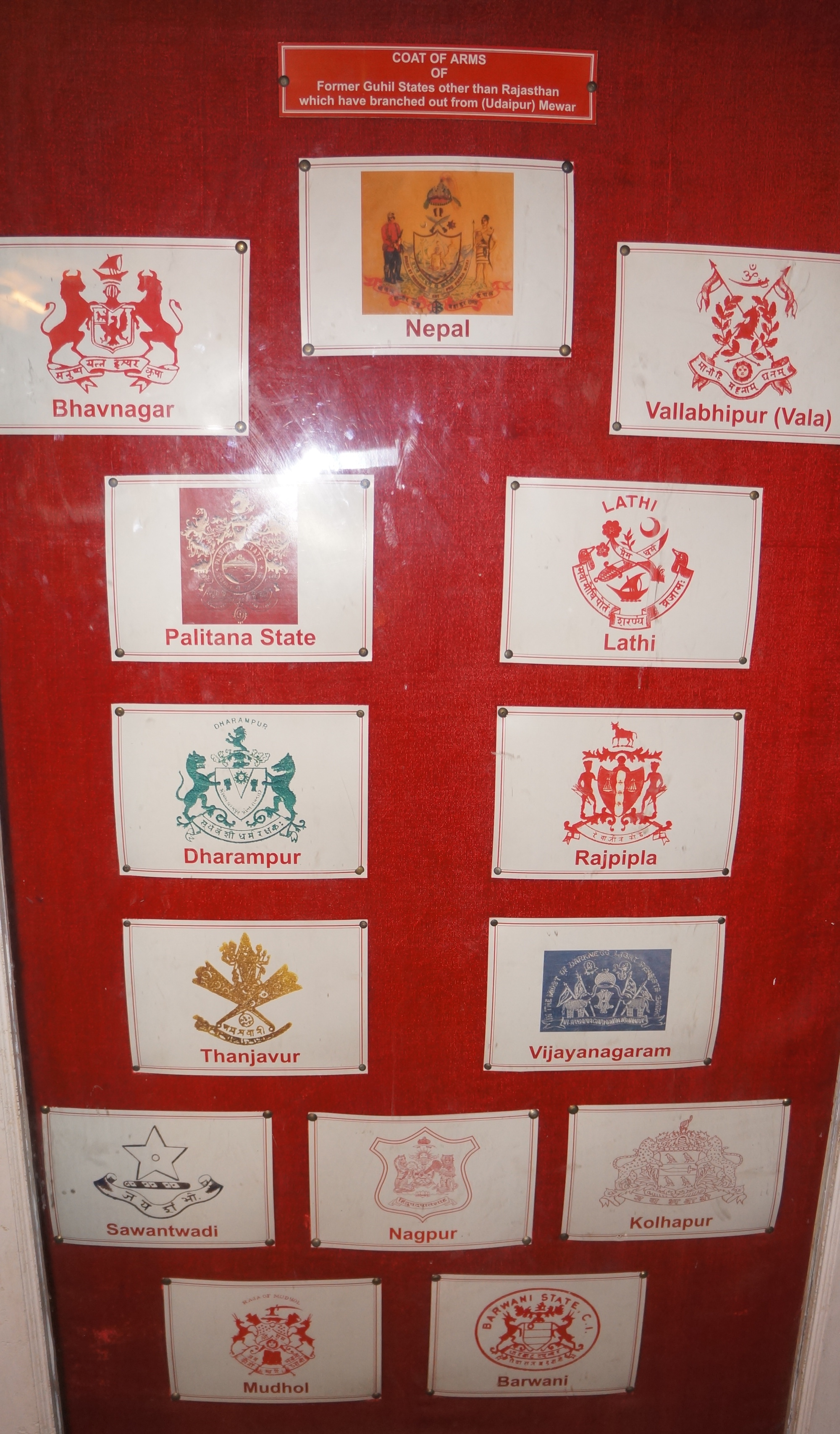
Branches of the Sisodia Clan

- Sitarama Raju
- Pusapati Amala Gajapati Raju (Founder)
- Pusapati Rachi Gajapati Raju
- Pusapati Tama Gajapati Raju
- Viziaram Raju I (reigned 1710–1757)
- Ananda Raju
- Viziaram Raju II
- Narayana Babu Raju
- Viziaram Raju III (Viziaram Gajapati Raju, reigned 1848–1878)
- Pusapati Ananda Gajapati Raju (reigned 1879–1897)
- Raja Pusapati Viziaram Gajapati Raju
- Alak Narayana Gajapati Raju
  - Pusapati Vijayarama Gajapati Raju (eldest son of Alak Narayana Gajapati Raju, reigned 1945–1995)
    - Pusapati Ananda Gajapati Raju (eldest son of Vijayarama Gajapati Raju, reigned 1995–2016)
    - Pusapati Ashok Gajapati Raju (second son of Vijayarama Gajapati Raju, ascended in 2016)

== Notable members ==
- P.S. Kumaraswamy Raja – Former chief minister of Madras State (1949–1952) and governor of Odisha (1954–1956).
- Pusapati Vijaya Ananda Gajapathi Raju (also known as Maharajah of Vizianagram or Vizzy) – Former Indian cricketer, politician, and winner of the Padma Bhushan Award in Sports in 1958.
