= Pithapuram Estate =

Pithapuram
- Zamindari Estate
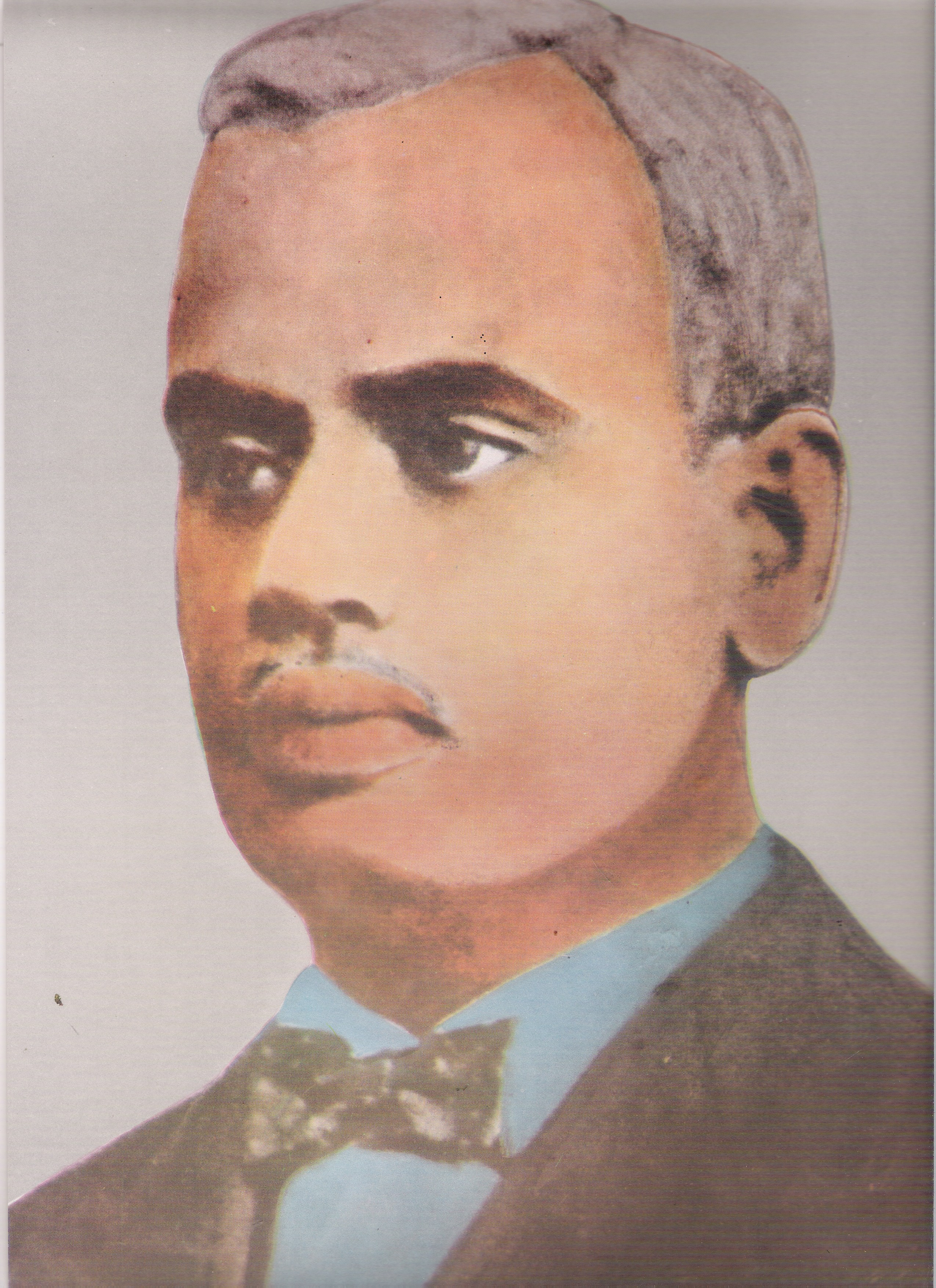
- Rao Venkata Kumara Mahipati Surya Rao, Last Zamindar of the Estate
- Number of Villages: 128 Villages(by 1802)
- Possession: 1749
- Accession: 1949

Pithapuram Zamindari was a Zamindari in the East Godavari district of Madras Presidency. In 1802, Pithapuram was overshadowed by the renowned Peddapuram estate. But, in 1843, all other villages of Peddapuram were lost except Kottam and they were left with only 36 villages. In this period, Pithapuram gained prominence, and purchased some estates of Peddapuram like Thotapalle Estate. By 1874-1875 this estate had a revenue of Rs 5 lakhs and paid a tribute of Rs 2.5 lakhs. The Pitapuram Raja sponsored the monumental classical Telugu dictionary Sri Suryarayandhra Nighantuvu and commissioned the first typewriter in Telugu.

== History ==
The Zamindars of this estate belonged to the Padma Nayaka Velama Stock. This family traces its origin to the Venkatagiri royal family. One of the members of Venkatagiri family came to Godvari districts as a Sardar, whose descendants later settled there. This family came to Godavari District in 1571 and was given the Jagir of Anaparthi. They were made the Sardars of Rajahmundry who led 4000 troops. They got the Zamindari sanad in 1749 from Rustum Khan, a general of the Nizam of Hyderabad. Later they made a permanent settlement with the British in 1802. The total area of the estate in 1903 was 393 square miles with a revenue of INR 9,14,000/- paying a peskash of 2,44,000/-. Later they were also given the titles of Maharaja as a personal distinction.

== Relations ==
The Zamindars of Pithapuram are closely related to the Nuzvid Estate Rajas through marital alliances. Bobbili, Venkatagiri, and Jetprole royal families are very closely related to Pithapuram royal family as they all claim their descent from the same ancestor.
