= Dorikithe Dongalu =

- Theatrical release poster
- Directed by: P. Subrahmanyam
- Written by: Pinisetty (dialogues)
- Screenplay by: P. Subrahmanyam
- Story by: K.A.R. Acharya
- Produced by: D. L. Narayana
- Starring: N. T. Rama Rao [[Jamuna (actress)|Jamuna]]
- Cinematography: K. S.Prasad; Rajagopal; Ravikant Nagaich
- Edited by: S. S. Prakash
- Music by: S. Rajeswara Rao
- Production company: Chandamama Films
- Release date: 26 February 1965
- Running time: 184 mins
- Country: India
- Language: Telugu

Dorikithe Dongalu (transl. Thieves, if they are caught) is a 1965 Indian Telugu-language science fiction and action film directed by P. Subrahmanyam. It stars N. T. Rama Rao and Jamuna. The music was composed by S. Rajeswara Rao. The film was produced by D. L. Narayana on the Chandamama Films banner. It is one of the earliest science fiction films in Indian cinema.

== Cast ==
- N. T. Rama Rao as Nandan Rao / Agneyam
- Jamuna as Latha / Madhavi
- Rajanala as Sudarsanam
- Kantha Rao as Sundaram
- V. Nagayya as Minister
- Gummadi as Commissioner Prabhakar Rao
- Dhulipala as Visweswarayya
- Ramana Reddy as Anji
- Satyanarayana as Dr. Gangadharam
- Allu Ramalingaiah as Lawyer Brahmayya
- Malladi as Rama Rao
- Jagga Rao as Inspector Prakash
- Suryakantham as Santhamma
- Rajasree as Appalamma and Rosy (dual role)
- Sarada as Karuna
- Jayanthi as Anuradha

== Music ==
Dorikithe Dongalu

Film score by S. Rajeswara Rao
- Released: 1965
- Genre: Soundtrack
- Length: 30:58
- Producer: S. Rajeswara Rao

S. Rajeswara Rao chronology
Bobbili Yuddham (1964)	Dorikithe Dongalu (1965)	Palnati Yuddham (1966)

Music was composed by S. Rajeswara Rao.

S. No.	Song title	Lyrics	Singers	length
1	"Sri Venkatesa Eesa"	Aarudhra	M. Balamuralikrishna, P. Susheela, Bangalore Latha	3:28
2	"Evariki Teliyadule Intula Sangati"	C. Narayana Reddy	Ghantasala	3:41
3	"Ennisarlu Cheppalayya"	Aarudhra	Swarnalatha, V. Satya Rao	2:51
4	"Mavayya Chikkavayya"	Dasaradhi	S. Janaki	3:51
5	"Evariki Teliyadule Yuvakula Sangati"	C. Narayana Reddy	P. Susheela	2:47
6	"Evarannaravi Kannulani"	C. Narayana Reddy	Ghantasala, P. Susheela	3:19
7	"Naa Kanti Velugu"	Aarudhra	S. Janaki	3:28
8	"Egurutunnadi Yavvanamu"	C. Narayana Reddy	Ghantasala, P. Susheela	3:44
9	"Evare Naa Cheli"	Dasaradhi	P. Susheela, S. Janaki	3:49
