= Ancienville =

- Commune
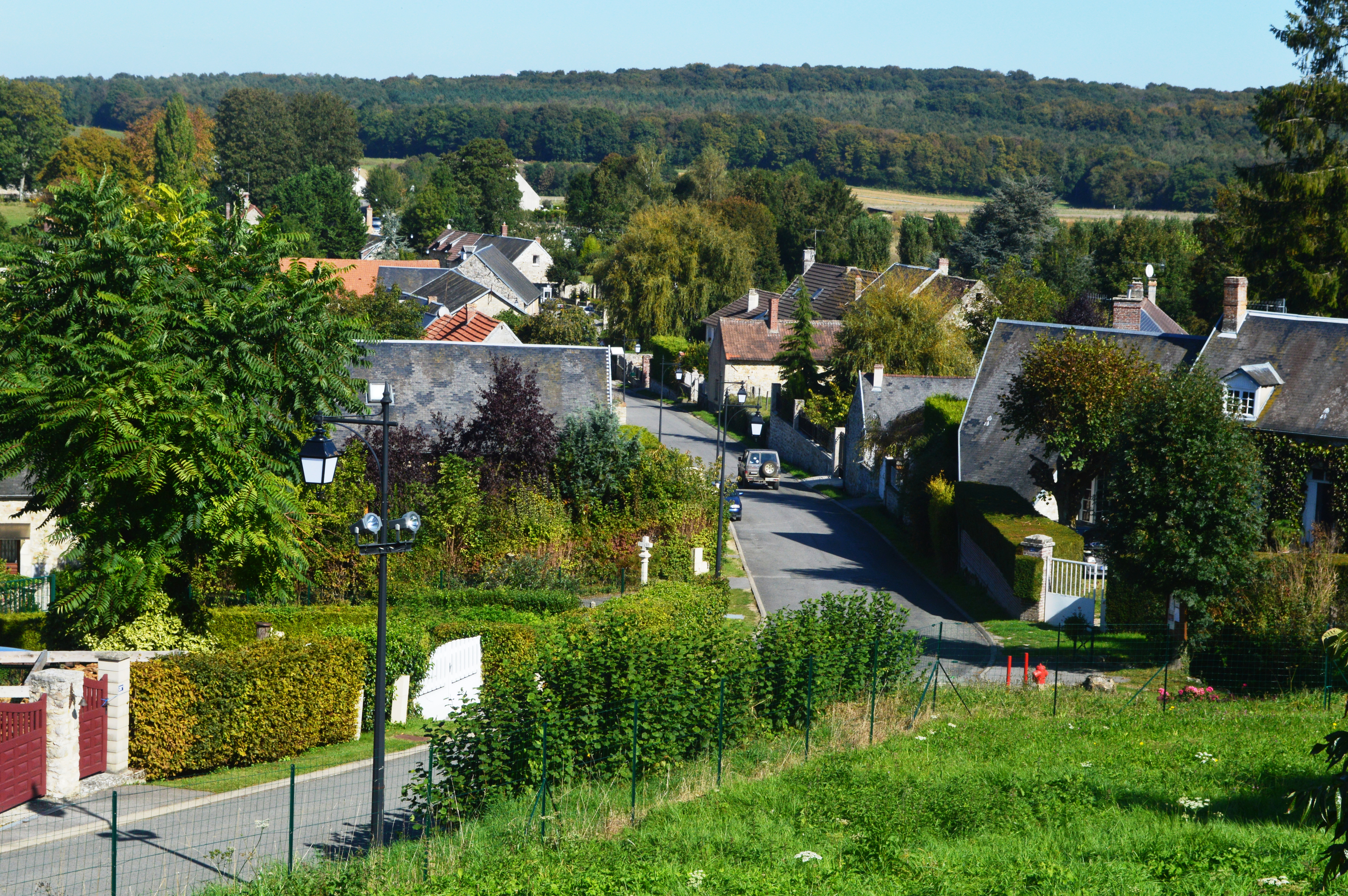
- Location of Ancienville
- Location within France Location within Hauts-de-France
- Coordinates: 49°13′04″N 3°12′54″E
- Country: France
- Region: Hauts-de-France
- Department: Aisne
- Arrondissement: Soissons
- Canton: Villers-Cotterêts
- Intercommunality: Retz-en-Valois

Government
  - Mayor (2026–32): Thierry Gaudriot
- Area^{1}: 3.85 km^{2} (1.49 sq mi)
- Elevation: 132 m (433 ft)
- Highest elevation: 174 m (571 ft)
- Lowest elevation: 72 m (236 ft)
- Population (2023): 78
  - Density: 20/km^{2} (52/sq mi)
- Time zone: UTC+01:00 (CET)
  - Summer (DST): UTC+02:00 (CEST)
- INSEE/Postal code: 02015 /02600
- ^{1} French Land Register data, which excludes lakes, ponds, glaciers > 1 km^{2} (0.386 sq mi or 247 acres) and river estuaries.

Ancienville (French pronunciation: [ɑ̃sjɛ̃vil]) is a commune in the department of Aisne in the Hauts-de-France region of northern France.

== Geography ==
Ancienville is located some 10 km east by southeast of Villers-Cotterets and 25 km southwest of Soissons. The commune can be accessed by the D973 road from Villers-Cotterets in the northwest continuing west through the heart of the commune north of the village to Chouy. The D1370 runs south from the D973 and passes through the village continuing south to Noroy-sur-Ourcq. The commune is partly farmland with forests in an arc from the southwest to the northeast.

La Savieres river flows south forming the western border of the commune and continues to join the Ourcq river near Silly-la-Poterie.

== Population ==
Historical population
Year	Pop.	±% p.a.
1968	60	—
1975	46	−3.72%
1982	32	−5.05%
1990	34	+0.76%
1999	78	+9.67%
2007	66	−2.07%
2012	78	+3.40%
2017	75	−0.78%
2023	78	+0.66%
Source: INSEE

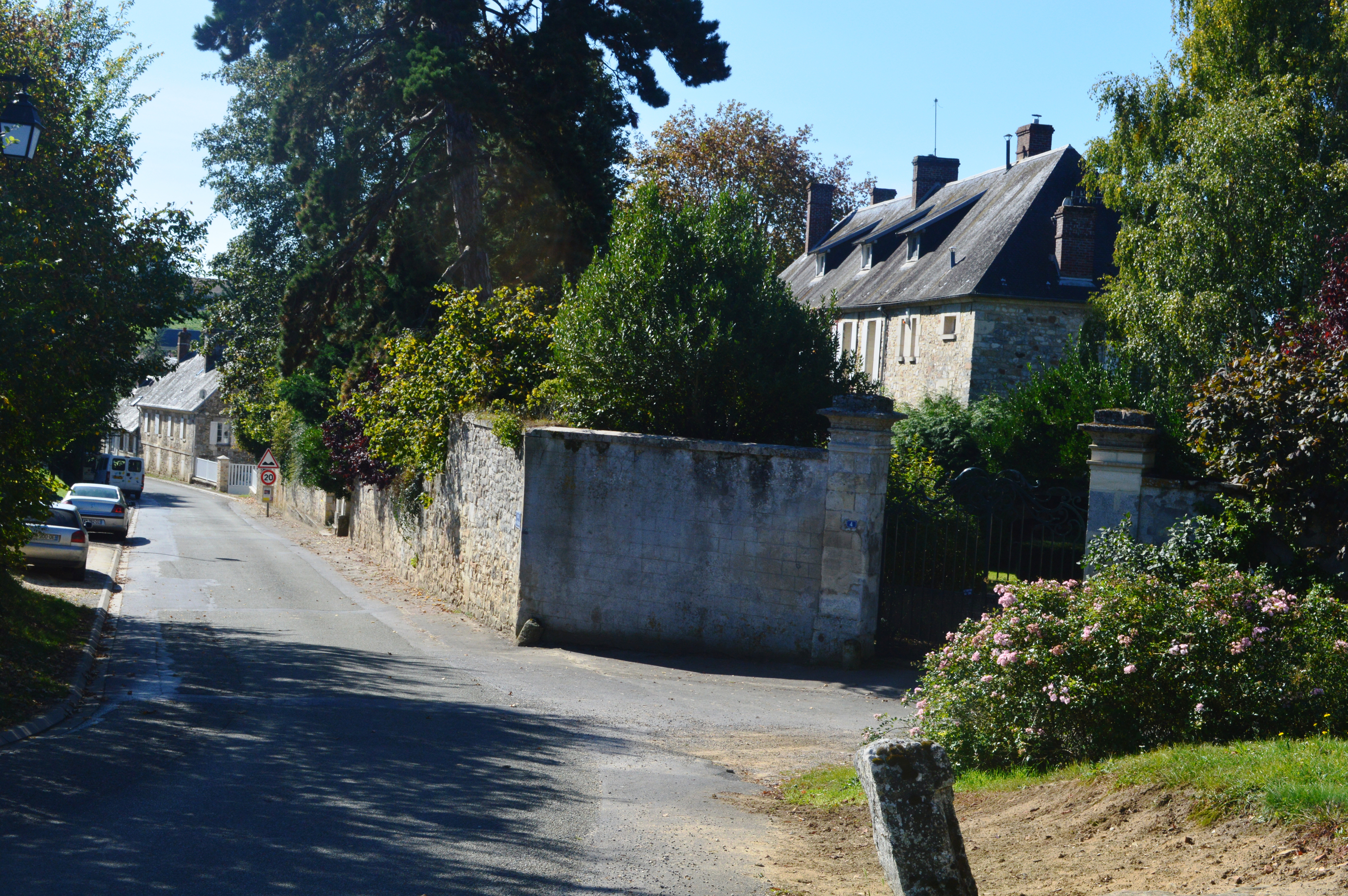
A street in Ancienville

== Culture and heritage ==
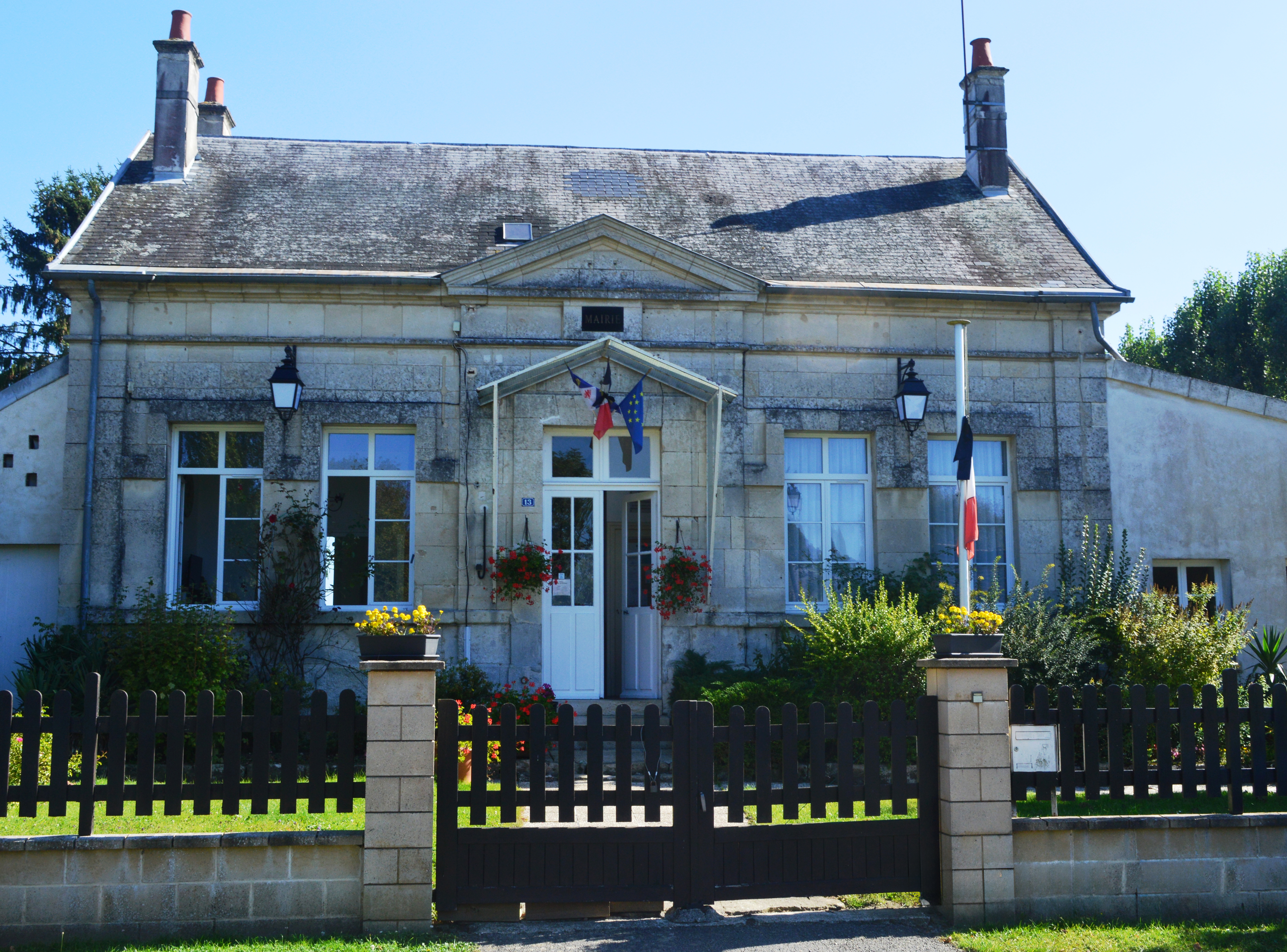
Ancienville Town Hall / School

=== Civil heritage ===
The commune has a number of buildings and structures that are registered as historical monuments:

- The Town Hall/School (1841)

=== Religious heritage ===
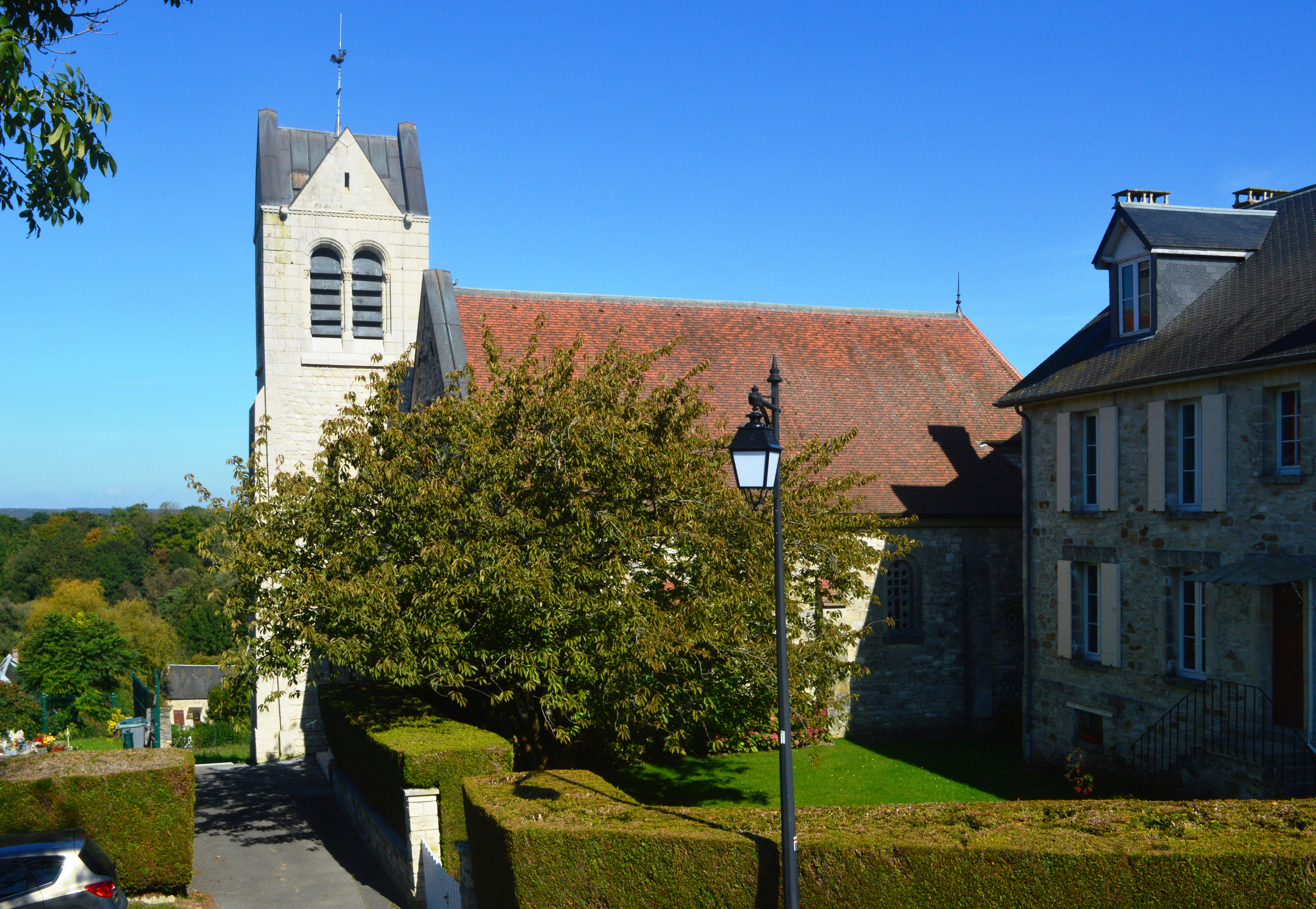
The Church of Saint-Médard

The commune has several religious buildings and structures that are registered as historical monuments:

- A Fountain of devotion to the Virgin (19th century)
- A Wayside Cross (20th century)
- The Cross of the Federation Wayside Cross (1790)
- A Stone Cross (16th century)
- The Parish Church of Saint-Médard (20th century) The Church contains many items that are registered as historical objects:
  - A Funeral plaque for Jean Charpentier, Priest for Ancienville (1732)
  - A Tombstone for Jean Charpentier, Priest for Ancienville (1732)
  - A Stained Glass window: Nativity, Saint Médard, the adoration of the Magi (16th century)
  - A Bust: Christ (19th century)
  - A Chasuble, Maniple, Chalice cover (19th century)
  - A Chasuble, Stole, and Maniple (18th century)
  - A Statuette from a Processional Staff (19th century)
  - A Parish Processional Staff of Saint Médard (18th century)
  - A Baptismal font (1788)
  - A set of 2 Stained glass windows: Saint Médard, donor, Nativity, and the adoration of the Magi (16th century)
  - A Tombstone (3) (16th century)
  - A Tombstone (2) (16th century)
  - The Furniture in the Church

Gallery of Historical Monuments

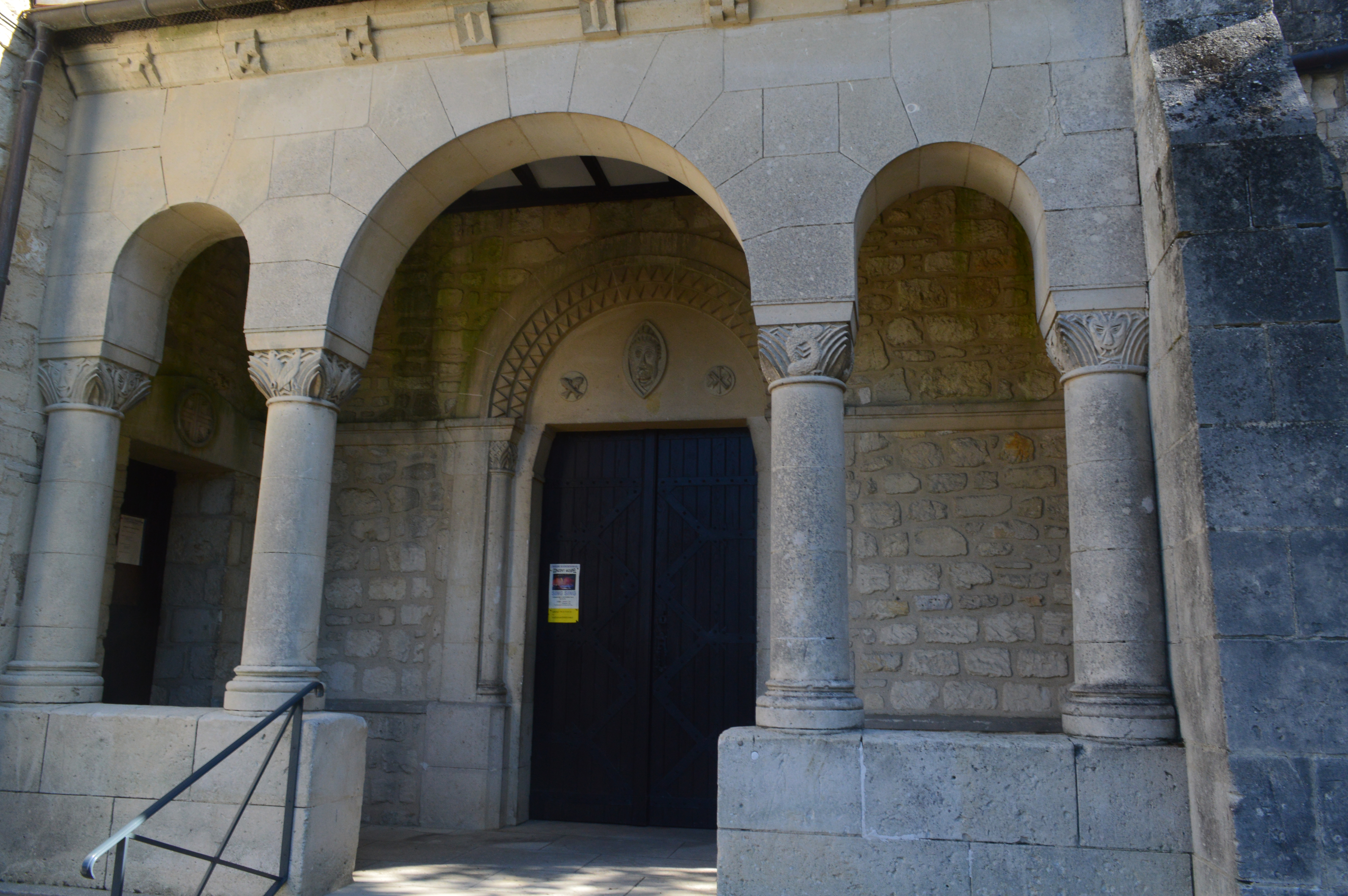
Entrance to the Church of Saint-Médard

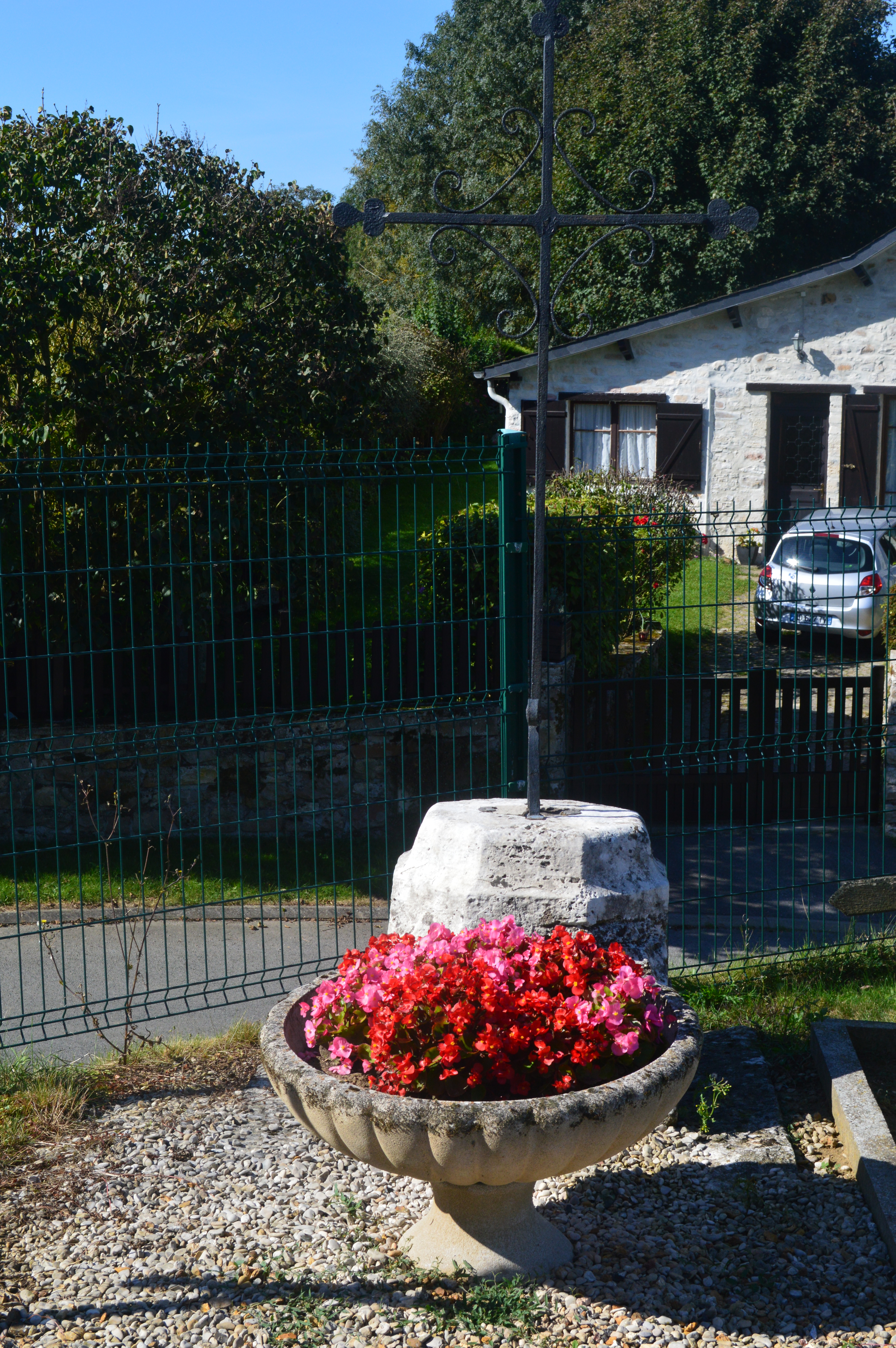
The Wayside Cross

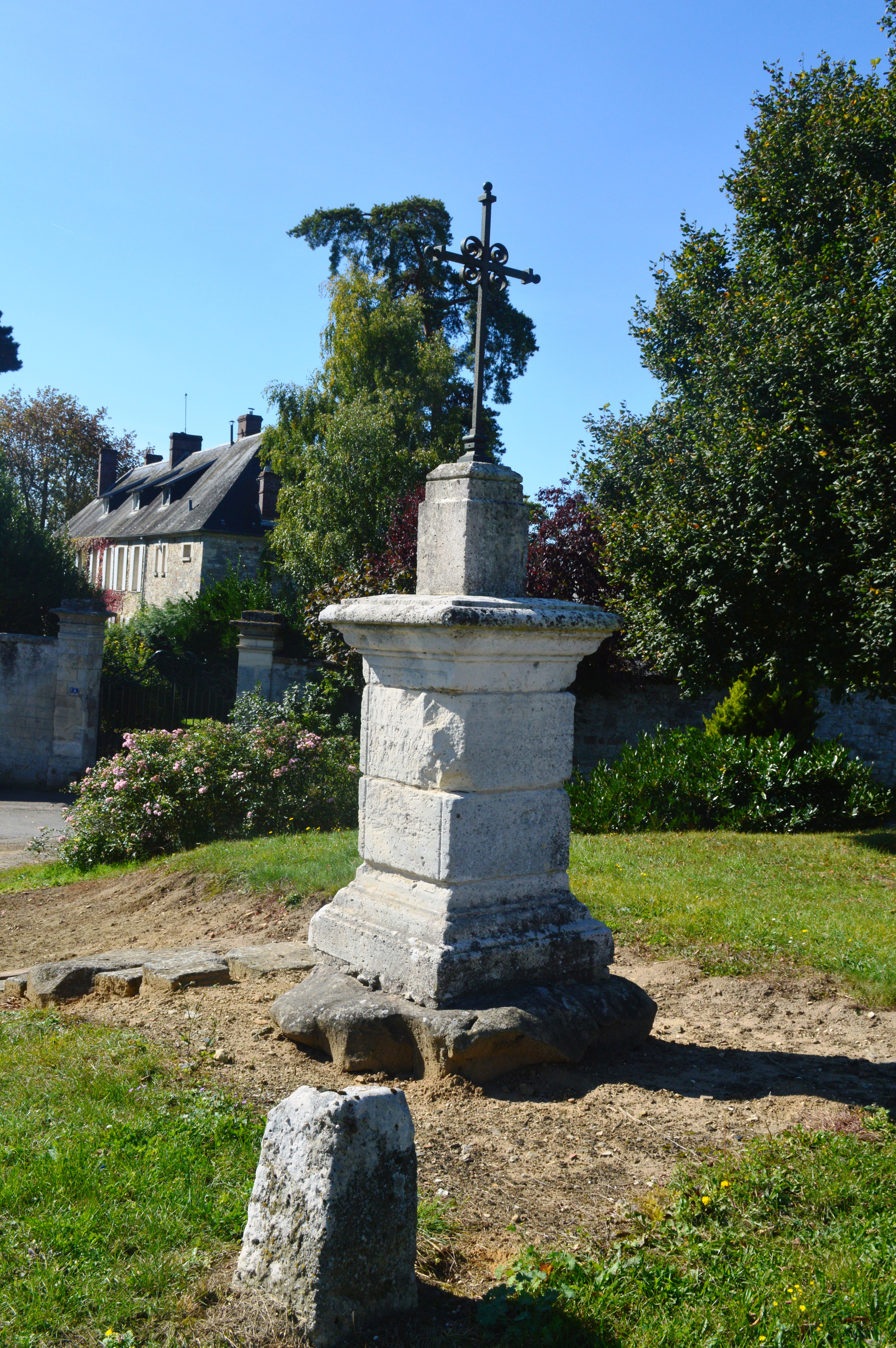
The Cross of the Federation

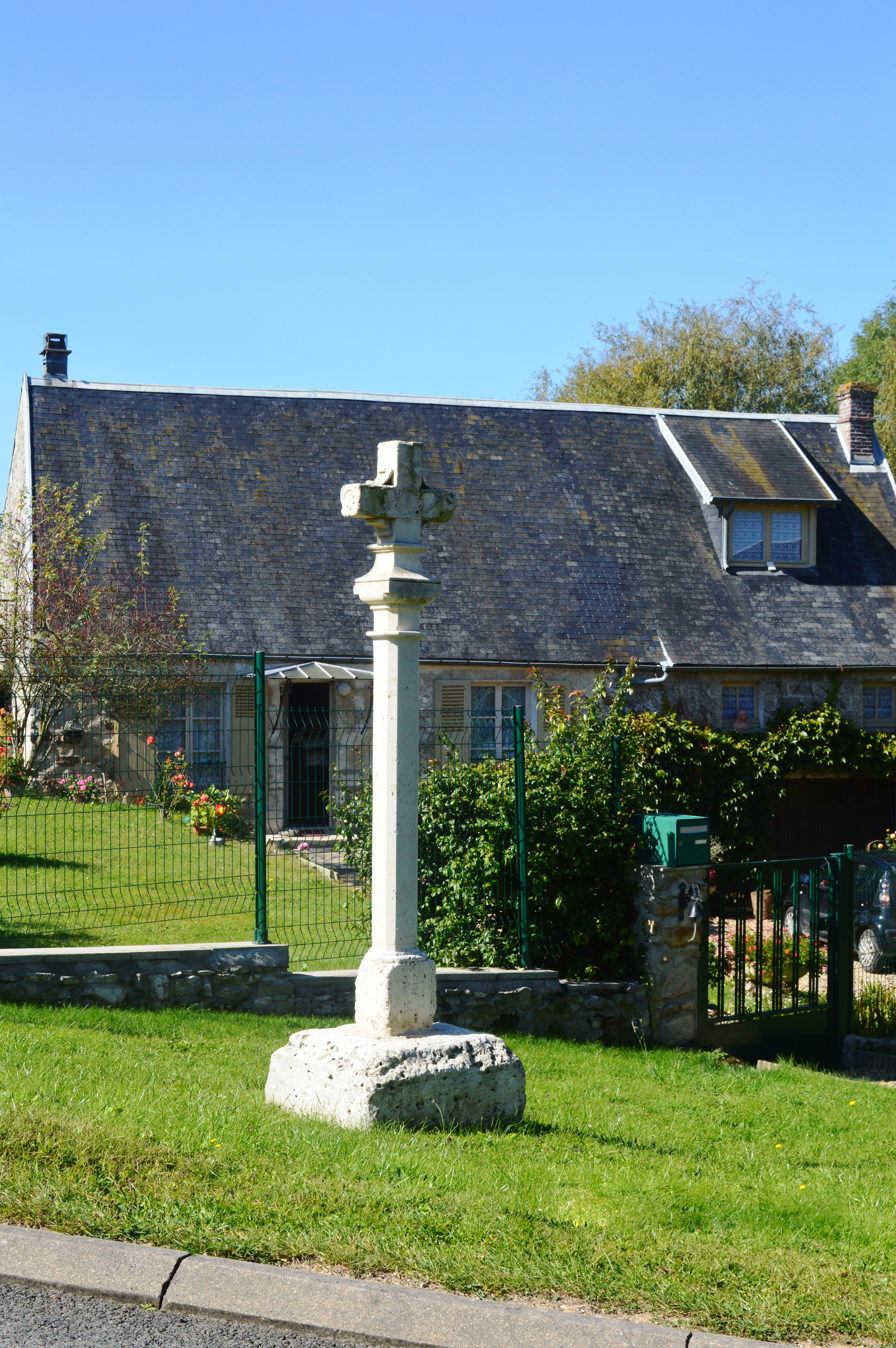
The Stone Cross

== Notable People linked to the commune ==
Charles Joseph Patissier de Bussy-Castelnau, Marquis de Bussy-Castelnau (1718–1785), Governor-General of Pondicherry.

== See also ==
- Communes of the Aisne department
