= Kondaveeti Venkatakavi =

Indian poet, scholar, and film writer

- Born: Kondaveeti Venkatayya; January 25, 1918; Vipparla, Guntur district, Andhra Pradesh, India
- Died: April 7, 1991 (aged 73)
- Other name: Kondaveeti Venkata Kavi
- Occupations: Poet, Film Writer
- Years active: 1932 - 1991
- Parents: Narayana (father); Sheshamma (mother)

Kondaveeti Venkatakavi is an Indian poet, scholar, and scriptwriter from Andhra Pradesh. He served as the Principal of a Sanskrit college. He is best known for writing the dialogues in the film Daana Veera Soora Karna (1977).

== Childhood ==
Venkata Kavi was born as Venkatayya to Narayana and Seshamma in the village of Vipparla in Guntur district.

== Education ==
He got primary education was from his scholarly father. He studied Sanskrit poetry and pancha kavyas under the guidance of Narikonda Nammalaraju, a poet from Gadwal. He later moved to Tenali and worked as assistant under Tripuraneni Ramaswamy Chowdary. He mastered Sriharsha Naishada under his uncle Yetukri Narasimhayya. He worked as assistant under Srimat Tirumala Mudhimalla Varadhacharya, who was working to teach Sanskrit to all sections of the people. He learned Sanskrit Vyakarana and Patanjali Bhashya from Kavi Ramanujacharya. He leaned Telugu Vyakarana from Duvvur Venkataramana Sastry. He moved to Vijayanagaram and studied grammar under Chinaseetarama Sastry. He later practiced Avadhanam under the guidance of Chellapilla Venkata Sastry.

== Career ==
=== Teacher ===
He worked as a Telugu scholar in the Board High School in Macherla from 1948 to 1952, and as Sanskrit lecturer in Ponnur oriental college for forty years from 1952.

=== Poet ===
He started writing poetry at the age of 14 and wrote many books. In 1932, he wrote Karshaka Satakam about the problems of farmers. It was banned by the government. In 1946, he wrote Chennakesava Satakam. He wrote Divyasmrutulu remembering Vemana, Gurajada Apparao and other eminent Telugu personalities. He published a research work on Amuktamalyada of Krishna Devaraya. He wrote a book with rational thoughts on Melu Kolupu in 1942.

He wrote a literary series with the name Nehru Charita.

==== Works ====
- Karshaka satakam (1932)
- Hithabhodha (1942)
- Bhagavatula vaari Vamsavali (1943)
- Udayalakshmi Nrusimhavataravali (1945)
- Chennakesava satakam (1946)
- Bhavanarayana Charita (1953)
- Divyasmrutulu (1954)
- Nehru Charitra Part I (1956)
- Trisati (1960)
- Nehru Charitra Part II (1962)
- Bali (1963)

== Film career ==
Venkata Kavi was the Principal of a Sanskrit college and initially turned down an offer from actor and filmmaker N. T. Rama Rao to write the script and dialogues for Daana Veera Soora Karna (1977). However, after Rama Rao personally asked for his assistance, Venkata Kavi agreed to join the project. His dialogues received widespread acclaim and significantly contributed to the film's success. Released as LP records and audio cassettes, they sold very well, with His Master's Voice reporting continued sales of cassettes and CDs even years later. The dialogues were noted for their literary quality and were written in formal Telugu. Unlike most mythological films of that time, which used colloquial language (Vaaduka bhaasha), Daana Veera Soora Karna distinguished itself with a formal literary style (Graanthika bhaasha).

After this film, Venkata Kavi worked on various projects, including Sri Madvirata Parvam (1979), Sreemadvirat Veerabrahmendra Swami Charitra (1984), and Tandra Paparayudu (1986). He later contributed to the Eenadu magazine, where he was responsible for news headlines until his death.

== Filmography ==
- Daaana Veera Soora Karna, dialogues (1977) - dialogues
- Sri Madvirata Parvam, dialogues (1979)
- Srimadvirat Veerabrahmendra Swami Charitra, dialogues (1984)
- Tandra Paparayudu, dialogues (1986)
- Aadi Dampatulu, lyricist (1986)

== Awards ==
- Kaviraju title in Guntur district in 1953
- Kala Prapoorna from Andhra University in 1971
- Nandi Award for Best Dialogue Writer - Tandra Paparayudu (1986)
