= Bobbili Yuddham =

1964 film

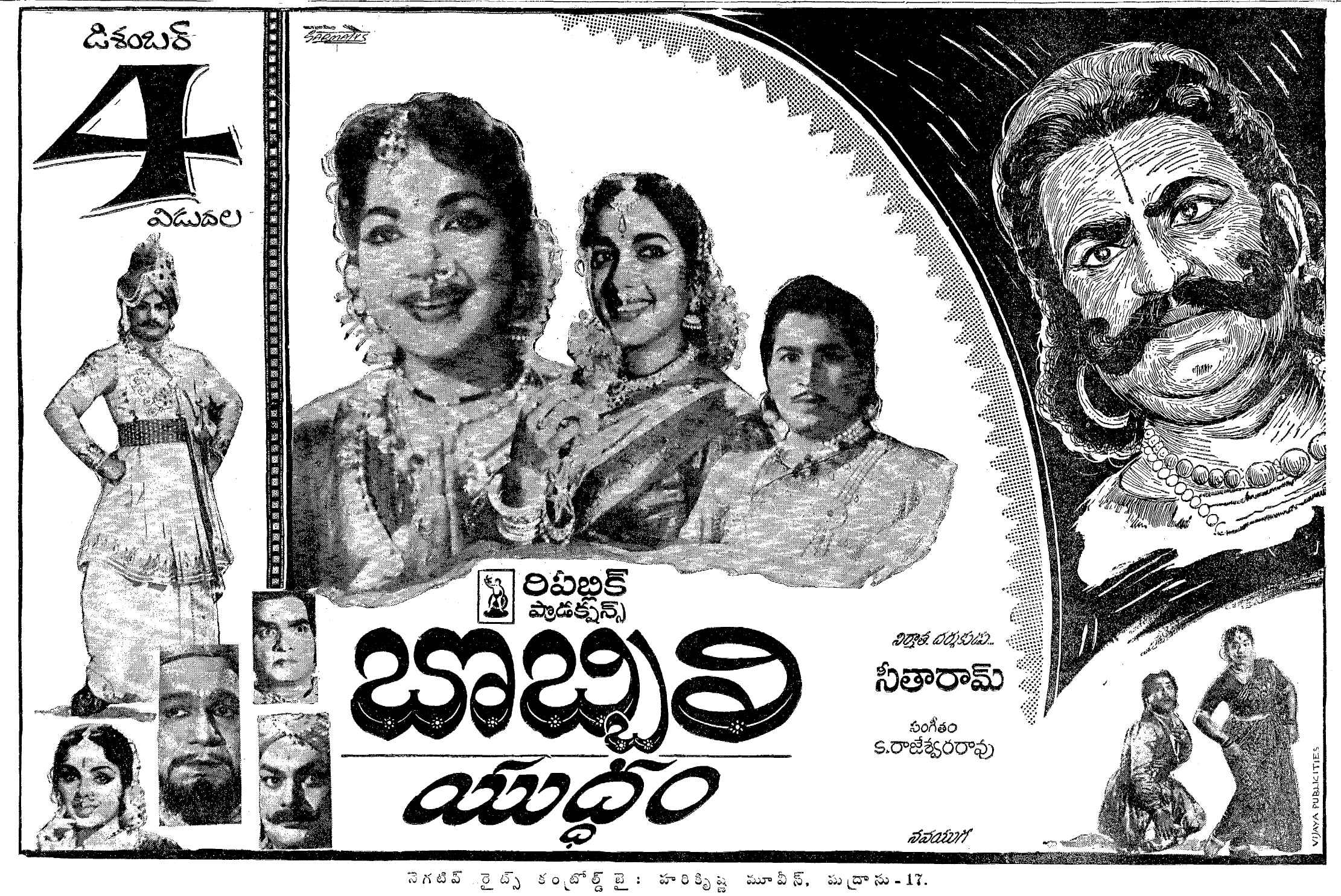
- Theatrical release poster
- Directed by: C. Seetaram
- Written by: Samudrala Sr; Gabbita Venkatrao (dialogues)
- Screenplay by: C. Seetaram
- Story by: C. Seetaram
- Produced by: C. Seetaram
- Starring: N. T. Rama Rao; Bhanumathi Ramakrishna; S.V. Ranga Rao
- Cinematography: Kamal Ghosh
- Edited by: Kandaswamy
- Music by: S. Rajeswara Rao
- Production company: Republic Productions
- Release date: 4 December 1964
- Running time: 153 minutes
- Country: India
- Language: Telugu

Bobbili Yuddham (transl. Battle of Bobbili) is a 1964 Indian Telugu-language war film, based on the eponymous battle between Bobbili and Vizianagaram kingdoms in 1757. The film was produced and directed by C. Seetaram. It stars N. T. Rama Rao, Bhanumathi Ramakrishna, and S. V. Ranga Rao, with music composed by S. Rajeswara Rao.

== Cast ==
- N. T. Rama Rao as Raja Rangarayalu
- Bhanumathi Ramakrishna as Mallama Devi
- S. V. Ranga Rao as Tandra Paparayudu
- Rajanala as Vijayaramaraju
- V. Nagayya as Milk Man
- Dhulipala as Narsarayudu
- Mukkamala as Bussy
- Padmanabham as Varahalu
- M. Balaiah as Dharmarayudu
- C. S. R. as Dubassi Lakshmanna
- C. Seetaram as Vengalarayudu
- M. R. Radha as Hyder Jung
- Jamuna as Subhadra
- Jayanthi as Chandrayamma
- Geetanjali as Swarna
- L. Vijayalakshmi as Dancer
- Surabhi Balasaraswathi as Venkatalakshmi

== Soundtrack ==
Bobbili Yuddham

Film score by S. Rajeswara Rao
- Released: 1964
- Genre: Soundtrack
- Length: 28:41
- Producer: S. Rajeswara Rao

S. Rajeswara Rao chronology
Manchi Manishi (1964)	Bobbili Yuddham (1964)	Dorikithe Dongalu (1965)

Music composed by S. Rajeswara Rao. The song "Ninuchera" is based on Bhairavi raga.

S. No.	Song title	Lyrics	Singers	length
1	"Sirineelu Rayuda"	Aarudra	S. Rajeswara Rao	1:28
2	"Srikara Karunala"	Samudrala Jr	Bhanumathi Ramakrishna	3:12
3	"Muthyala Chemmachekka"	Aarudra	P. Susheela	2:53
4	"Andala Raanive"	Sri Sri	Ghantasala, P. Susheela	3:11
5	"Ooyalalooginadoyi"	C. Narayana Reddy	Bhanumathi Ramakrishna	3:04
6	"Muripinche Andale"	Sri Sri	Ghantasala, P. Susheela	4:35
7	"Sevalu Cheyyale"	Aarudra	P. B. Srinivas, S. Janaki	3:19
8	"Ninuchhera Manasayera"	Sri Sri	P. Susheela	3:07
9	"Emaiah Ramaiah"	Kosaraju	Vasantha, Swarnalatha, V. Satya Rao	3:25
