= Velama =

Caste found mainly in Andhra Pradesh and Telangana

Velama are a Hindu caste found mainly in Andhra Pradesh and Telangana. The term "Velama" was first recorded for the community in a 17th century inscription. The text "Velugoti Vari Vamsavali" documents the medieval military history of Velama rulers.

== Origin and history ==
The Velamas have been identified by this name since the 17th century, although the poet Srinatha used the terms Velama and Padmanayaka separately in his early 15th-century text, Bhimeswara Puranamu.

Historian Cynthia Talbot notes, however, that while such terms were in use, the Velama identity as a consolidated caste category had not yet formed during the Kakatiya period. According to her, caste labels like Velama and Padmanayaka did not denote closed kin groups at that time and only crystallized into distinct social identities in the 16th and 17th centuries. The Padmanayaka designation first appears in inscriptions around 1586 CE and was used by various Telugu warrior lineages of Telangana origin, including those with clan names like Recherla, Vipparla, and Inigela. These groups did not share a single ancestry but were united by military service under the Kakatiya dynasty and began to appropriate the Padmanayaka title as a mark of prestige.

Members of the Recherla dynasty ruled parts of Telangana from the hill forts of Rachakonda (1335–1434 CE) and Devarakonda (1335–1475 CE). Following the Bahmani conquest of Telangana, some members of this lineage migrated south and entered the service of the Vijayanagara Empire as generals and administrators. They were granted the jagir of Velugodu in present-day Kurnool district and became known at court by the surname Velugoti. While Pamela Price describes these chiefs and their descendants, such as the Velugotis, as part of the Velama aristocracy, historian Cynthia Talbot notes that the Velama designation did not exist as a consolidated caste category during the time of the Recherla dynasty.

Over time, the Velugoti dynasty established the Venkatagiri estate in the Nellore district, and its cadet branches later contributed to the founding of the princely states of Pithapuram, Bobbili, and Jatprole in the early 17th century. Within the genealogical tradition of the Velugotivari Vamsavali, the Velugoti family claimed descent from the Recherla Nayakas and identified themselves as both Padmanayakas and Velamas.

Talbot notes that such genealogies were composed over long periods by family bards and were shaped more by oral memory and political motives than by direct historical accuracy. She also points out that the term Velama appears only once in Kakatiya-era sources, where it referred to a collective of agriculturists rather than warriors. Despite this, by the 17th century, ruling families of Venkatagiri, Bobbili, Pithapuram, and Jatprole had adopted the Velama identity. A 1613 CE inscription even refers to one individual as a Padmanayaka and another as a Velama, indicating that these identities remained distinct for a time. Literary sources like the Bhimesvara Purāṇamu also listed them as separate communities.

During the same period, some Velama chieftains became prominent under the Golconda Sultanate as zamindars. The sultanate used a rank-based system to differentiate Velama groups by their military and administrative service, which fostered rivalries among them. Among the notable Velama lineages under Golconda rule were the Meka dynasty Appa Raos of Nuzvid and the Malraju clan of Narasaraopet. The Velugoti and Appa Rao families, in particular, claimed royal status, while other significant lineages included the Pithapuram Raos and the Ranga Raos of Bobbili.

Eventually, the Padmanayaka identity was absorbed into the broader Velama caste label, which had by then gained considerable prestige through associations with martial valor and Kakatiya-era loyalty. According to a tradition recorded by Subba Rao in the early 20th century, Padmanayakas were originally Kapus (agriculturalists) who became Velamas and later gained Padmanayaka status through military service to the Kakatiya state. Talbot concludes that caste identities like Velama were shaped not by fixed bloodlines but by evolving social memory, constructed genealogies, and retrospective claims to Kakatiya political legitimacy.

Because the Kakatiyas came to symbolize the origins of the Telugu warrior class, political elites in later centuries continued to assert genealogical links to them well into the British colonial period. In addition to the Velugotis, Velama lords of Bobbili, Pithapuram, and Jatprole also traced their lineage to the Kakatiya era. Similar claims were made by the chiefs of Paloncha in present-day Khammam district and the Vipparla family of Nuzvid. The Damarla chiefs of southern Andhra even submitted a genealogy to the early 19th-century Mackenzie Collection, asserting that one of their ancestors had served Kakatiya king Prataparudra—a claim that historian Cynthia Talbot considers unlikely, as the Damarlas do not appear in historical records prior to the early 17th century.

The Velugoti family continued to trace its origins to the Recherla chiefs of the 12th and 13th centuries and resided in multiple regions—Rachakonda, Devarakonda, Velugodu, and North Mallur (now part of Chittoor district)—before settling in Nellore in 1695. By the 19th century, their status was so prominent that they were often chosen as adoptive heirs by rival Velama branches such as the Pithapuram and Bobbili Ranga Raos, especially when direct male lineages became extinct. These adoptions further consolidated the political influence of the Velugoti family across the Telugu-speaking region.

== Modern Community ==
Velamas are Hindus, primarily belonging to the Vaishnavism denomination.

== Dynasties and Estates ==
- Kalahasti Nayakas
- Bobbili Estate
- Venkatgiri Estate
- Pithapuram Estate
- Nuzvid Estate
- Narasaraopet Zamindari
- Jetprole Samasthanam
- Recharla Nayakas

== Notable people ==
- Koka Subba Rao, ninth Chief Justice of India
- K. Chandrashekar Rao, former Chief Minister of Telangana
- Vijay Deverakonda, Actor
