= Tandra Paparayudu =

General of Bobbili

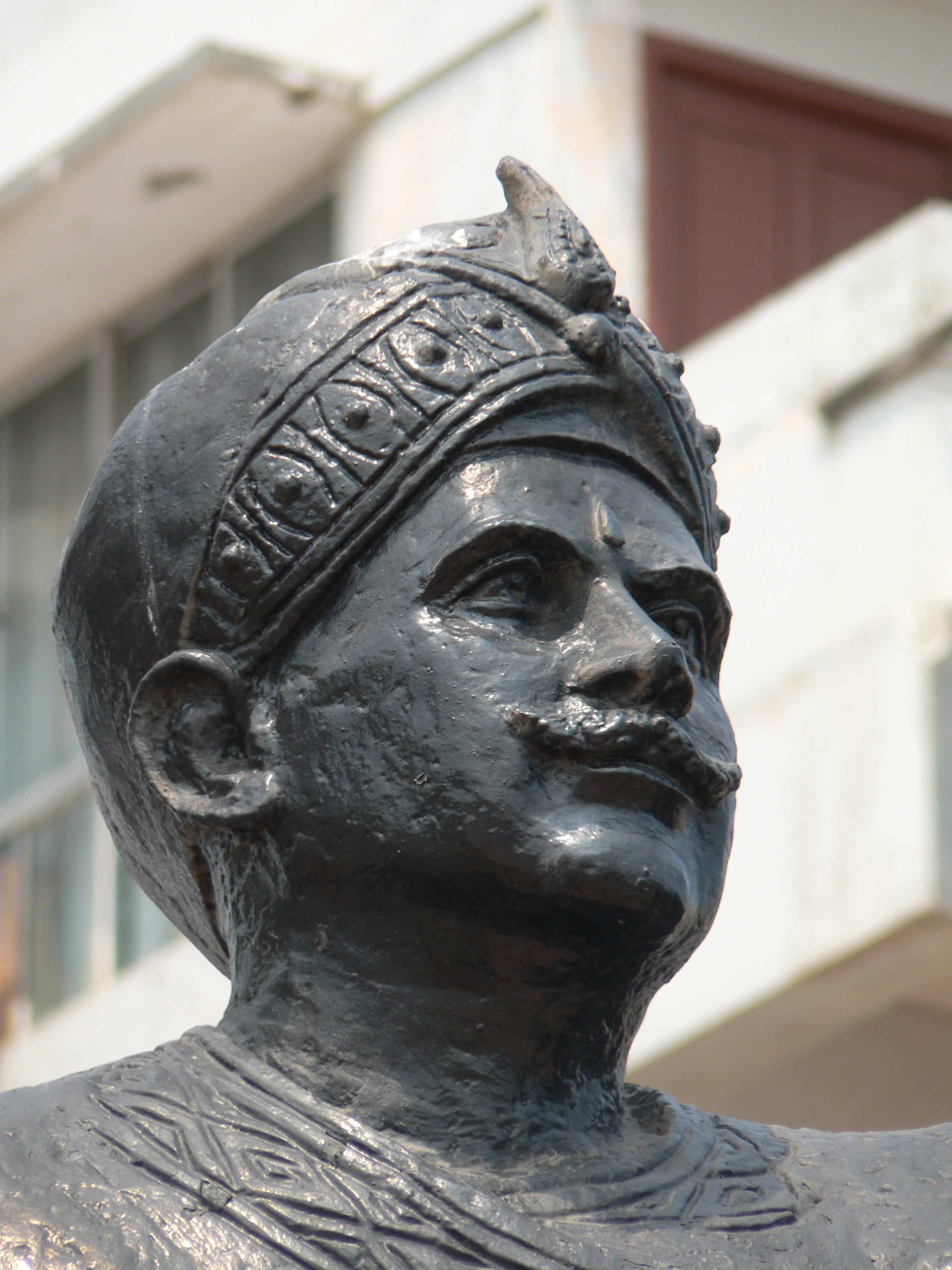
- Title: Army General of Bobbili

Tandra Paparayudu was an Army General of Bobbili who assassinated Pusapati Vijayarama Gajapati Raju I Raja of Vizianagaram, and committed his Royal suicide during the Battle of Bobbili in 1757, a significant historical event in the Princely state of Vizianagaram, the present day Vizianagaram district of Andhra Pradesh.

== Maharaja of Venkatagiri ==
The town of Bobbili was founded during the 17th century by Pedda Rayudu, the 15th descendant of the Rajas of Venkatagiri, who belongs to Padmanayaka Velama clan. The town was originally named "Pedda-Puli" ("The Big Tiger") after Sher Muhammad Khan, the Nawab of Srikakulam who granted it as a gift to the Maharaja of Venkatgiri for his services in his southern campaigns. However, with time, the town became known as "Pebbuli", then "Bebbuli" and finally "Bobbili". Pusapati Madhava Varma was the ancestor of the royal Vizianagaram family. The rivalry between the two families dates back to 1652. Pedda Rayudu's son Lingappa Rayudu, who succeeded him, built a fort, and selected Bobbili as his Headquarters. The son of Sher Muhammad Khan was abducted by rebels and Lingappa saved him. He was granted 12 villages and the hereditary title Ranga Rao in recognition of his service.

== Background ==
Lingappa was succeeded by his adopted son Vengal Ranga Rayudu and the latter by Rangapati Rayudu. His son Rayadappa Rayudu succeeded him and later his adopted son Gopalakrishna Rayudu took over. During Gopalakrishna Rayudu rule in 1753, the Northern Circars were assigned to French by the Nizam of Hyderabad. The French East India Governor Marquis de Bussy-Castelnau, agreed to lease Srikakulam and Rajahmundry Circars to Pusapati Vijayarama Gajapati Raju I, the Raja of Vizianagaram. A rupture between Bussy and the Nizam led to the weakening of the former's authority. Vijarama Raju placed his troops at the disposal of Bussy and helped him in re-establishing his suzerainty. Viziarama Raju persuaded Bussy to help him in defeating his arch rival, the Raja of Bobbili. On 24 January 1757, Bussy with his army and the army of Pusapati Vijayarama Gajapati Raju I in tow marched towards the Bobbili fort. The army of Gopalakrishna Ranga Rao was no match for the combined armies of Marquis de Bussy-Castelnau and Pusapati Vijayarama Gajapati Raju I. Gopalakrishna Rayudu was led by his Army General Tandra Paparayudu and his army, who put up a brave fight till the end.

The French General knew that it would be impossible to reach Bobbili via Rajam as Paparayudu was camping there and took a different route to reach the fort. Rani Mallamma Devi, wife of Ranga Rao and sister of Paparayudu, sent a message to him on coming to know of the enemy's advance towards the fort. However, the enemy intercepted the courier and the message did not reach Paparayudu. Meanwhile, Ranga Rao and his men after defending the fort for several hours realised that the enemy could not be contained for long. Ranga Rao did not want the women and children in the fort to be at the mercy of the enemy. He ordered them to be sacrificed. Rani Mallamma Devi committed suicide. When the news reached him, Tandra Paparayudu rushed to the demolished fort and saw his sister and the entire family lying on the ground in a pool of blood. Seething with vengeance he took an oath to kill Pusapati Vijayarama Gajapati Raju I.

== The battle ==
Pusapati Vijayarama Gajapati Raju I was camping in a Tent, basking in the glory of the war, which annihilated his enemy. Tandra Paparayudu along with Devulapalli Peddanna and Buddaraju Venkaiah managed to reach the tent in which Pusapati Vijayarama Gajapati Raju I was sleeping. Paparayudu gained entry through the rear of the tent, while the other two stood guard at the entrance. He woke up Pusapati Vijayarama Gajapati Raju I shouting "Puli, Puli... Bobbili Puli" (Tiger, Tiger... The Tiger of Bobbili). Pusapati Vijayarama Gajapati Raju I tried to divert his attention saying that Velama heroes should not be little their clan as cowards gaining entry through the backdoor. "You have wiped out our entire clan through dubious means and have no right to get ethical treatment," replied Paparayudu and stabbed him repeatedly in the chest. Hearing the commotion, the bodyguard of Pusapati Vijayarama Gajapati Raju I tried to enter the tent but was killed by Peddanna, who was guarding the entrance. The entire army was alerted and the Bobbili tiger Paparayudu and the other two killed themselves.

== In popular culture ==
- Bobbili Yuddham
- Tandra Paparayudu (film)
