= Tandra Paparayudu (film) =

1986 film by Dasari Narayana Rao

Thandra Paparayudu
- Poster
- Directed by: Dasari Narayana Rao
- Written by: Kondaveeti Venkatakavi
- Screenplay by: Dasari Narayana Rao
- Story by: Gopikrishna Kadha Vibhagam
- Produced by: Uppalapati Surya Narayana Raju
- Starring: Krishnam Raju; Jayaprada; Jayasudha; Sumalatha; Pran; Mohan Babu
- Cinematography: P. S. Prakash
- Edited by: D. Venkata Rathnam
- Music by: S. Rajeswara Rao
- Production company: Gopi Krishna Movies
- Release date: 9 October 1986
- Country: India
- Language: Telugu
- Budget: ₹1.5 crore

Tandra Paparayudu is a 1986 Indian Telugu-language biographical war film directed by Dasari Narayana Rao and produced by U. Suryanarayana Raju under the Gopi Krishna Movies banner. Starring Krishnam Raju, Jayaprada, Jayasudha, Sumalatha, Pran and Mohan Babu, the film is based on the life of 18th-century warrior Tandra Paparayudu, the General of Bobbili, and his conflict with General Bussy. Despite being made on a high budget of ₹1.5 crore, the film was a major box-office failure. It was screened at the 11th International Film Festival of India and won two Nandi Awards.

== Cast ==
- Krishnam Raju as Tandra Paparayudu
- Jayaprada as Jyothirmayi
- Jayasudha as Mallamma
- Sumalatha as Chinnamma
- Pran as General Bussy
- Mohan Babu as Vijaya Ramaraju
- Rama Krishna as Ranga Rayudu
- Hema Choudhary as Special Dancer
- Kanta Rao
- Dhulipala as Buchanna
- M. Balaiah
- J. V. Somayajulu
- Sarathi as Dubasi Latchmanna
- Kota Srinivasa Rao as Hyder Jung
- Sudhakar as Vengala Rayudu
- P.J. Sarma as Venkaiah
- Prabha
- Anjali Devi
- Gummadi
- Suryakantham
- Nirmalamma
- Vijayalalitha
- Haranath as Narasa Rayudu
- Manik Irani as Prachandudu

== Production ==
The film was completely shot at Poodipalli village at Devipatnam.

== Soundtrack ==
Soundtrack was composed by S. Rajeswara Rao.

- Abhinandhana Mandara - K. J. Yesudas, P. Susheela
- Chali Chali Reyi - P. Susheela, Vani Jairam
- Lalitha Pulakantha - P. Susheela, Yesudas
- Rajante Neevele - P. Susheela, Vani Jairam
- Malle Kanna Thellana - K. J. Yesudas, P. Susheela
- Sarva Praja Rakshana - P. Susheela
- Ariverra Bayadha - Ramakrishna
- Ye Velpul - SPB
- Kalla Parani - S. P. Balasubrahmanyam
- Athipragalbha - K. J. Yesudas
- Nee Vachalatha - Ramakrishna
- Athi Balyamunundi - S. P. Balasubrahmanyam
- Garavakarava - S. P. Balasubrahmanyam

== Accolades ==
- Filmfare Best Actor Award (Telugu) – Krishnam Raju
- Nandi Award for Best Dialogue Writer – Kondaveeti Venkata Kavi
- Nandi Award for Best Costume Designer – Kameswara Rao
