= Bucy-le-Long =

- Commune
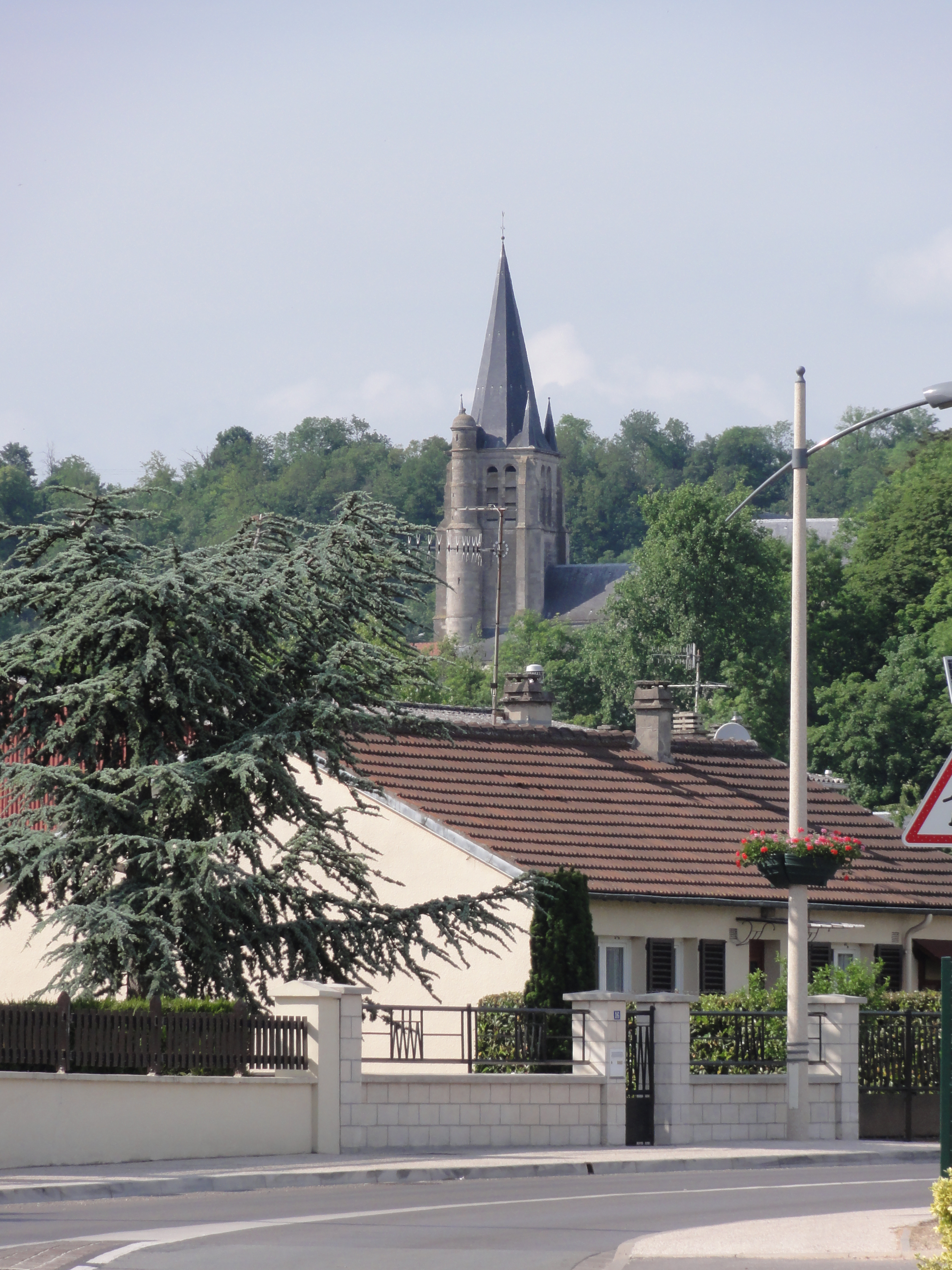
- The church of Bucy-le-Long

- Coat of arms
- Location of Bucy-le-Long
- Location within France Location within Hauts-de-France
- Coordinates: 49°23′29″N 3°23′41″E
- Country: France
- Region: Hauts-de-France
- Department: Aisne
- Arrondissement: Soissons
- Canton: Fère-en-Tardenois
- Intercommunality: Val de l'Aisne

Government
  - Mayor (2026–32): Thierry Routier
- Area^{1}: 12.86 km^{2} (4.97 sq mi)
- Elevation: 49 m (161 ft)
- Highest elevation: 161 m (528 ft)
- Lowest elevation: 39 m (128 ft)
- Population (2023): 1,947
  - Density: 151.4/km^{2} (392.1/sq mi)
- Time zone: UTC+01:00 (CET)
  - Summer (DST): UTC+02:00 (CEST)
- INSEE/Postal code: 02131 /02880
- ^{1} French Land Register data, which excludes lakes, ponds, glaciers > 1 km^{2} (0.386 sq mi or 247 acres) and river estuaries.

Bucy-le-Long (French pronunciation: [bysi lə lɔ̃]) is a commune in the department of Aisne in Hauts-de-France in northern France.

== Population ==
Historical population
Year	Pop.	±% p.a.
1968	1,387	—
1975	1,661	+2.61%
1982	1,801	+1.16%
1990	1,841	+0.27%
1999	1,958	+0.69%
2007	1,965	+0.04%
2012	1,926	−0.40%
2017	1,880	−0.48%
2023	1,947	+0.59%
Source: INSEE

== See also ==
- Communes of the Aisne department
