= Battle of Bobbili =

1757 battle

- Part of the Military transactions of the French East India Company
Date	24 January 1757
Location	Bobbili, Princely State of Venkatagiri
Result	Princely State of Vizianagaram annexes Bobbili
Territorial changes	None

Belligerents
Rajas of Pusapati	Rajas of Venkatagiri

Commanders and leaders
Marquis de Bussy-Castelnau; Pusapati Vijayarama Gajapati Raju I	Gopala Krishnarayudu; Tandra Paparayudu; Devulapalli Peddanna; Buddaraju Venkaiah

Casualties and losses
Assassination of Pusapati Vijayarama Gajapati Raju I	Royal Suicides of Tandra Paparayudu, Devulapalli Peddanna, and Buddaraju Venkaiah

The Battle of Bobbili, comprising the attack on the fort of Bobbili on 24 January 1757, was a significant event in the princely state of Vizianagaram (present day Vizianagaram district of Andhra Pradesh). Tandra Paparayudu gained the sobriquet The Tiger of Bobbili for his fierce, ultimately futile resistance, and final vengeance.

== Background ==
On 23 November 1753, a Paravana of Asif ad-Dawlah Mir Ali Salabat Jang, Subedar of Deccan conceded to Gen. Marquis de Bussy-Castelnau the parganas of Chicacole, Ellore, Rajahmundry etc. with an annual revenue RS.2, 00,000 towards the maintenance of the French troops in the Subah; this recognition of the help of these Circars amounted up to 10 lakhs of Rupees per year. De Bussy helped Salabat Jang to become the Subedar of Deccan. The Treaty of Aurangabad (made between the French and Salabat Jang in Aurangabad) bears the signature of Said Loukshur, Minister of Salabat Jang. He was one of the key sub-ordinates of Dupleix, who assisted him in expanding French activities in Northern Circars and along the Coromandel Coast. Furthermore, men under his command included the famous Hyder Ali of Mysore.

In 1756 Marquis de Bussy visited Rajahmundry. Vijayaramaraju had given a warm welcome to Bussy by going in front at Rajahmundry. There were differences between Vizianagaram Maharaja and the ruler of Bobbili, which led to the battle of Bobbili on 23 January 1757. It was fought by Bussy and the Raja of Vizianagaram-Pusapati Vijayarama Gajapati Raju I (Ruled 1710 – Died 1757) (Founder of Vizianagaram.

== Battle ==
On January 24, 1757, the combined armies of Gens. De Bussy and Pusapati marched towards the Bobbili Fort; Gopalakrishna Rayudu had stalwart Gen. Tandra Paparayudu. The French General knew that it would be impossible to reach Bobbili via Rajam inasmuch as Paparayudu's bivouac was there, and thus took a different route. Rani Mallamma Devi, wife of Ranga Rao and sister of Paparayudu, sent a message to him warning him of the advance. The courier was intercepted, however, and the vital message did not reach Paparayudu.

Meanwhile, Ranga Rao and his men after defending the fort for several hours realised that the enemy could not held off for much longer. Ranga Rao, not wanting the women and children to be at the mercy of the enemy, ordered them to be sacrificed. Rani Mallamma Devi committed suicide. When the news reached him, Tandra Paparayudu rushed to the now invested and demolished fort and saw his sister and the entire family lying on the ground in a pool of blood. Seething with vengeance he took an oath then and there to kill Pusapati.

Thereafter, Pusapati bivouacked in his pavilion, basking in the glory of his victory, for he had annihilated his enemy. He fell asleep, but he was not to enjoy his sleep for long. Tandra Paparayudu, along with his comrades Devulapalli Peddanna and Buddaraju Venkaiah, evaded the lax camp security and reached the tent. Paparayudu gained entry through the rear whereas his comrades stood guard at the entrance. He awoke his sworn enemy by announcing his presence, shouting "Puli, Puli... Bobbili Puli" (Tiger, Tiger... The Tiger of Bobbili). Pusapati, startled awake, ejaculated that they would belittle their entire clan as cowards for his having gained entry by stealth through the rear. Paparayudu riposted, "You have wiped out our entire clan through dubious means and have no right to get ethical treatment," and slew him by stabbed him repeatedly in the chest. Upon hearing the commotion, the negligent bodyguard of Pusapati tried to enter but was killed by Peddanna at the entrance. The entire army was then alerted, whereupon Paparayudu and his comrades killed themselves, thus joining their families in like manner.

The fort had been totally destroyed, the clan destroyed, and innumerable Bobbili soldiers had become casualties. There is still a street named after De Bussy in Yanam.

== In popular culture ==
- Bobbili Yuddham
- Tandra Paparayudu
