= Bobbili Estate =

Indian administrative division

Bobbili
- Zamindari Estate
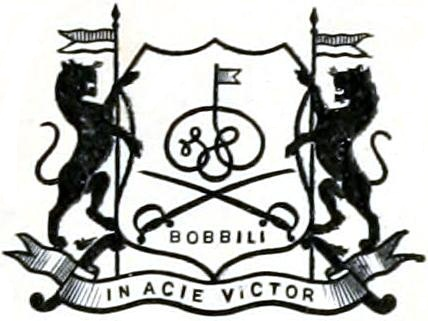
- Coat of Arms of the Bobbili Zamindari
- Country: India
- State: Andhra Pradesh
- District: Vizianagaram

Area
  - Total: 780 km^{2} (300 sq mi)
- Number of Jeroyati Villages: 139 Villages(by 1907)
- Number of Agraharams and Mokhasas: 53 and 5 respectively.
- Possession: 1652
- Revenue by 1907: 4,36,800/-
- Accession: 1949

Bobbili Estate was a Zamindari in the Vizagapatam District of the Madras Presidency, presently in the Vizianagaram district, Andhra Pradesh, India. It comprises 153 Jeroyati villages, 53 Agraharams, 5 Mokhasas by 1907 and a revenue of 8,33,000/- by 1938. It is one of the most influential Zamindari. It is spread over 300 square miles. It also bought shares in many estates like Kirlampudi, Dontamuru etc. It prospered in the period of British Raj.

== History ==
The Zamindars of this estate belong to the Venkatagiri estate Royal family. The 21st descendant of the Venkatagiri Estate owners named Pedda Rayudu. During the campaign of Shere Mohammad Khan, Nawab of chicacole to the circar districts, Pedda Rayudu accompanied him and proved his valour for which he was awarded the title, Ranga Rao as hereditary title and Rajam Hunda for lease. The Zamindar built a new fort and named the place Bobbili (originally Bebbuli which means Tiger or Sher). They were continuously in fight with Vizianagaram Rajah's which led to the Battle of Bobbili.

== Battle of Bobbili ==
The battle of Bobbili in 1757, is a significant episode in the history of the region. It was between Vizianagaram and French General Marquis de Bussy against Bobbili. The army of Bobbili faced the Vizianagaram-French allies with tremendous valour but lost the war and the heir evaded from the battlefield. He later re-established the territory during the British reign.

== During British Reign ==
This estate prospered during the British reign. They paid a peskash of 89,774/- by 1877. They got the hereditary tile of Raja and Personal distinction of Maharaja.

== Relations ==
The Zamindars of Bobbili are closely related to the Nuzvid Estate Raja's through marital alliances. Pithapuram Estate, Venkatagiri estate, Pinapenki and Jetprole royal families are very closely related to Bobbili Royal family as they all claim their descent from the same ancestor.
