= Marquis de Bussy-Castelnau =

Governor of French India

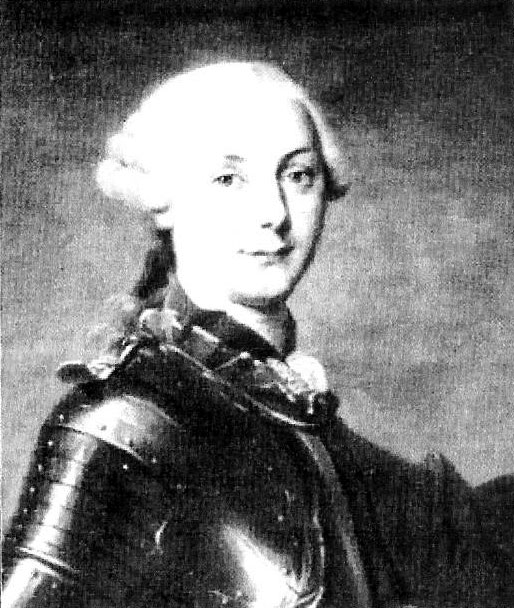

Gouverneur Général de l'Inde française
- In office 1783 – 7 January 1785
- Preceded by: Guillaume Léonard de Bellecombe, Seigneur de Teirac
- Succeeded by: François, Vicomte de Souillac

Personal details
- Born: 8 February 1718 or 1720 Bucy-le-Long or Ancienville
- Died: January 7, 1785 Pondicherry, French India, Kingdom of France

Charles Joseph Patissier, Marquis de Bussy-Castelnau (8 February 1718 or 8 February 1720 – 7 January 1785) or Charles Joseph Patissier de Bussy was the Governor General of the French colony of Pondicherry from 1783 to 1785. He served with distinction under Joseph François Dupleix in the East Indies, receiving the Order of Saint Louis. He contributed to the recovery from Britain of Pondicherry in 1748, and was named in 1782 to lead all French military forces beyond the Cape of Good Hope. He coordinated his operations with Pierre André de Suffren and fought against the British during the Indian campaigns of the American War of Independence.

== Early life and military career ==
Charles Joseph Patissier de Bussy was born as the son of N. Patissier de Bussy, colonel of infantry, and Sophie Ernestine Passaval. He was born either on 8 February 1718 in Bucy-le-Long, or on 8 February 1720 in Ancienville. He had a younger brother named Bouchard Patissier de Bussy, a lieutenant-colonel who died at 32 in July 1757. He also had a sister named Madeleine Sophie Patissier de Bussy.

De Bussy was appointed lieutenant in 1733 and captain in 1734. After the death of his father in 1736, he took up service in the French East India Company. He landed the same year in Port-Louis on Isle de France (Mauritius), whose governor general was Bertrand-François Mahé de La Bourdonnais. There, he participated in the military protection of the island. In 1738 he was on Île Bourbon (Réunion).

== Yanam ==
The Yanam region was presented to the Marquis de Bussy, the French General by Vizianagaram King Pusapati Peda Vijaya Rama Raju (1670–1756) as a token of gratitude for the help he had rendered in the fight against the rulers of Bobbili. Actually, it was in 1750 when French leader de Bussy was staying with the entire battalion near Hyderabad. Many soldiers had died due to some disease (smallpox). He was facing a financial crisis. Vijayaramaraju of Vizianagaram helped him to overcome the financial crisis and rebuild his battalion.

== Carnatic Wars ==
On 23 November 1753, a Paravana of Asif ad-Dawlah Mir Ali Salabat Jang, Subedar of Deccan conceded to Marquis de Bussy-Castelnau the paraganas of Chicacole, Ellore, Rajahmundry etc. with an annual revenue ₹2,00,000 for the maintenance of the French troops in the Subah in recognition of the help of these Circars amounted up to 10 lakhs of Rupees per year. de Bussy helped Salabat Jang to be the Subedar of Deccan. The agreement (Treaty of Aurangabad) made between the French and Salabat Jang in Aurangabad bears the signature of rukn o dowla syed Lashkar khan lashkar jung, Prime Minister of Salabat Jang. Actually, He was one of the key sub-ordinates of Dupleix who helped him in expanding French activities in Northern Circars and along the Coromandel Coast. Men in his command also included the famous Hyder Ali of Mysore.

In 1756 Marquis de Bussy visited Rajahmundry. Vijayaramaraju had given a warm welcome to Bussy by going in front at Rajahmundry. There were differences between Vizianagaram Maharaja and the ruler of Bobbili, which led to the Battle of Bobbili starting on 23 January 1757. The war was fought between the Rajah of Vizianagaram, Vijayaramaraju aided by the Bussy, the then French General and the Rajah of Bobbili. During the battle the Bobbili fort was totally destroyed and many Bobbili soldiers died. There is still a street named after Bussy in Yanam.

=== Relations with the Mughal Emperor Alamgir II ===
In the year 1755, De Bussy received letter from the newly ordained Mughal Emperor Alamgir II requesting French assistance to put down the Maratha Confederacy. Alamgir II asked if it was possible for De Bussy to dispatch a French contingent of 1000 strong. Alamgir II also promised to pay a hefty sum for the maintenance of the French and even promised to settle disputes in the Carnatic Wars in favor of the French East India Company.

== Family ==
He was married to the youngest stepdaughter of Dupleix, Marie in March 1754. He begot a daughter from her who died at Paris in 1759.

== Death ==
De Bussy died in Pondicherry on 7 January 1785.

== In popular culture ==
- de Bussy was an antagonist in the 1964 Telugu film Bobbili Yuddham. His character was portrayed by Mukkamala in the film.
- de Bussy was also an antagonist in the 1986 Telugu film Tandra Paparayudu. Pran portrayed him in the film.
- A street in Pondicherry, Rue De Bussy or Bussy Street, is named after de Bussy.

== See also ==
- Carnatic Wars
- Hyder Ali
- Inde française
- Madame Dupleix
- Muzaffar Jung

== Notes ==
Government offices
Preceded by ?	Commandant général des forces de terre et de mer dans l'Inde; 13 November 1781 – 31 March 1783	Succeeded by ?
Preceded by Guillaume Léonard de Bellecombe, Seigneur de Teirac	Gouverneur Général de l'Inde française 1783–1785	Succeeded by François, Vicomte de Souillac
