= Bobbili =

- Town
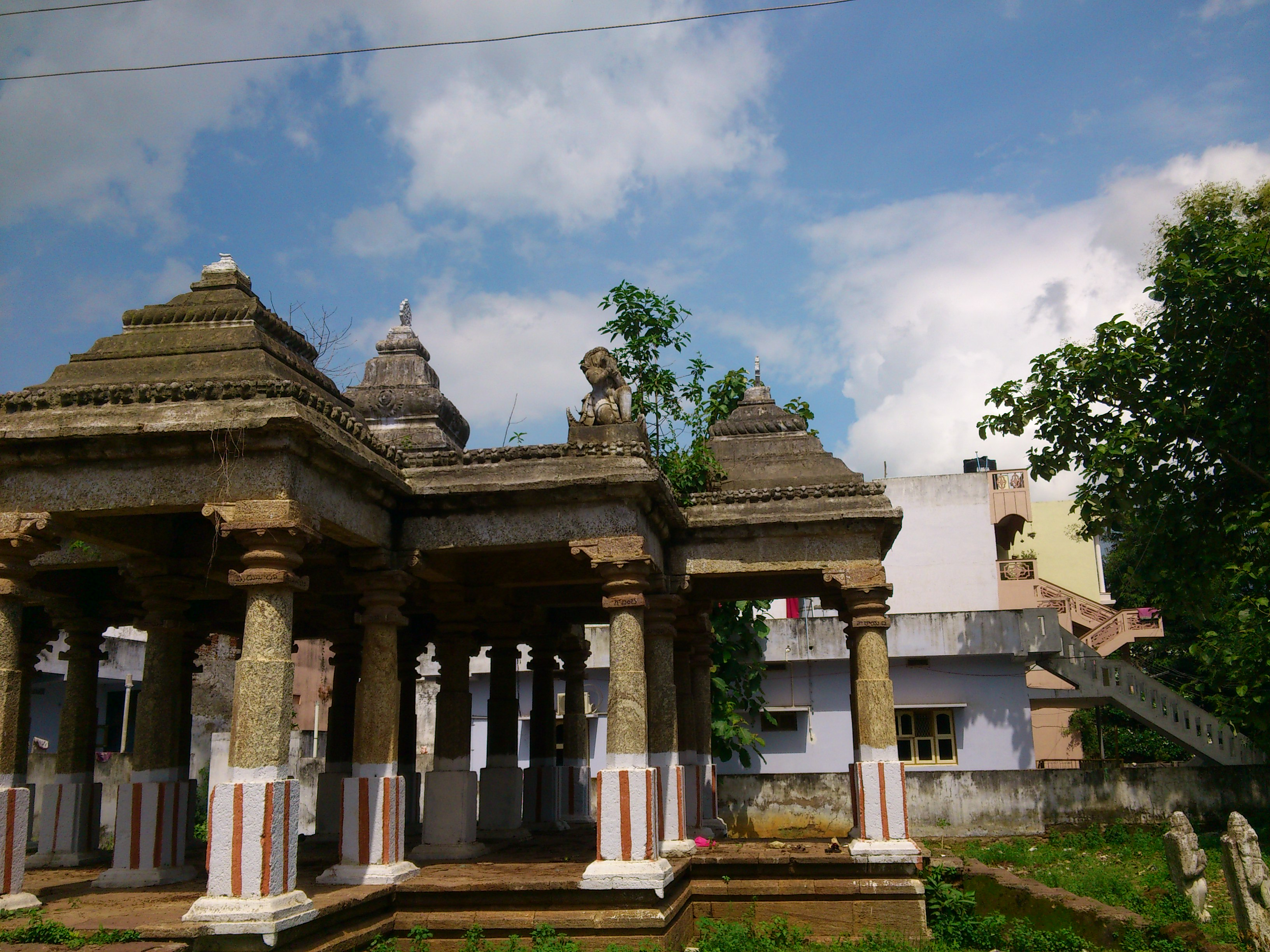
- Musical concert Mandapam at Bobbili

- Location in Andhra Pradesh,
- Coordinates: 18.5667°N 83.3667°E
- Country: India
- State: Andhra Pradesh
- District: Vizianagaram

Government
  - Type: Municipality
  - Body: Bobbili Municipality, BUDA
  - MLA: Ravu Venkata Swethachalapathi Kumara Krishna Ranga Rao (Baby Nayana)

Area
  - Total: 25.60 km^{2} (9.88 sq mi)
- Elevation: 103 m (338 ft)

Population (2011)
  - Total: 56,819
  - Density: 2,219/km^{2} (5,748/sq mi)

Languages
  - Official: Telugu
- Time zone: UTC+5:30 (IST)
- PIN: 535 558
- Telephone code: 91–8944
- Vehicle Registration: AP35 (Former); AP39 (from 30 January 2019)
- Sex ratio: 1:1 ♂/♀
- Website: Bobbili Municipality

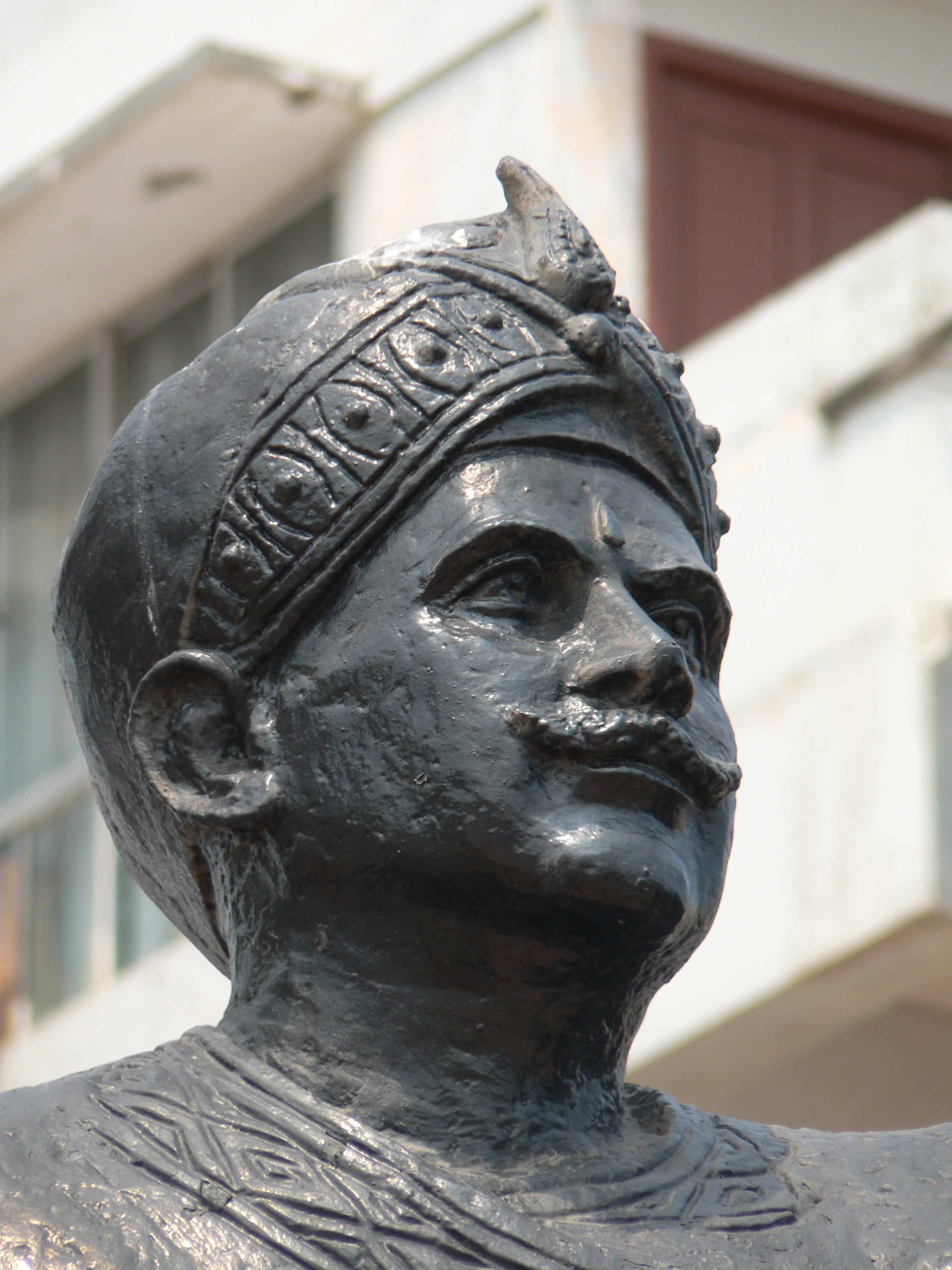
Statue of Thandra Paparayudu at RK Beach

Bobbili is a town in Vizianagaram district of the Indian state of Andhra Pradesh.

== Geography ==
Bobbili is located at 18.5667°N 83.3667°E. It has an average elevation of 103 metres (337 feet).

== History ==
The town of Bobbili was founded during the 17th century by Pedda Rayudu, the 15th descendant of the Rajah of Venkatagiri. However, with time, the town became known as "Pebbuli", then "Bebbuli" and finally "Bobbili".

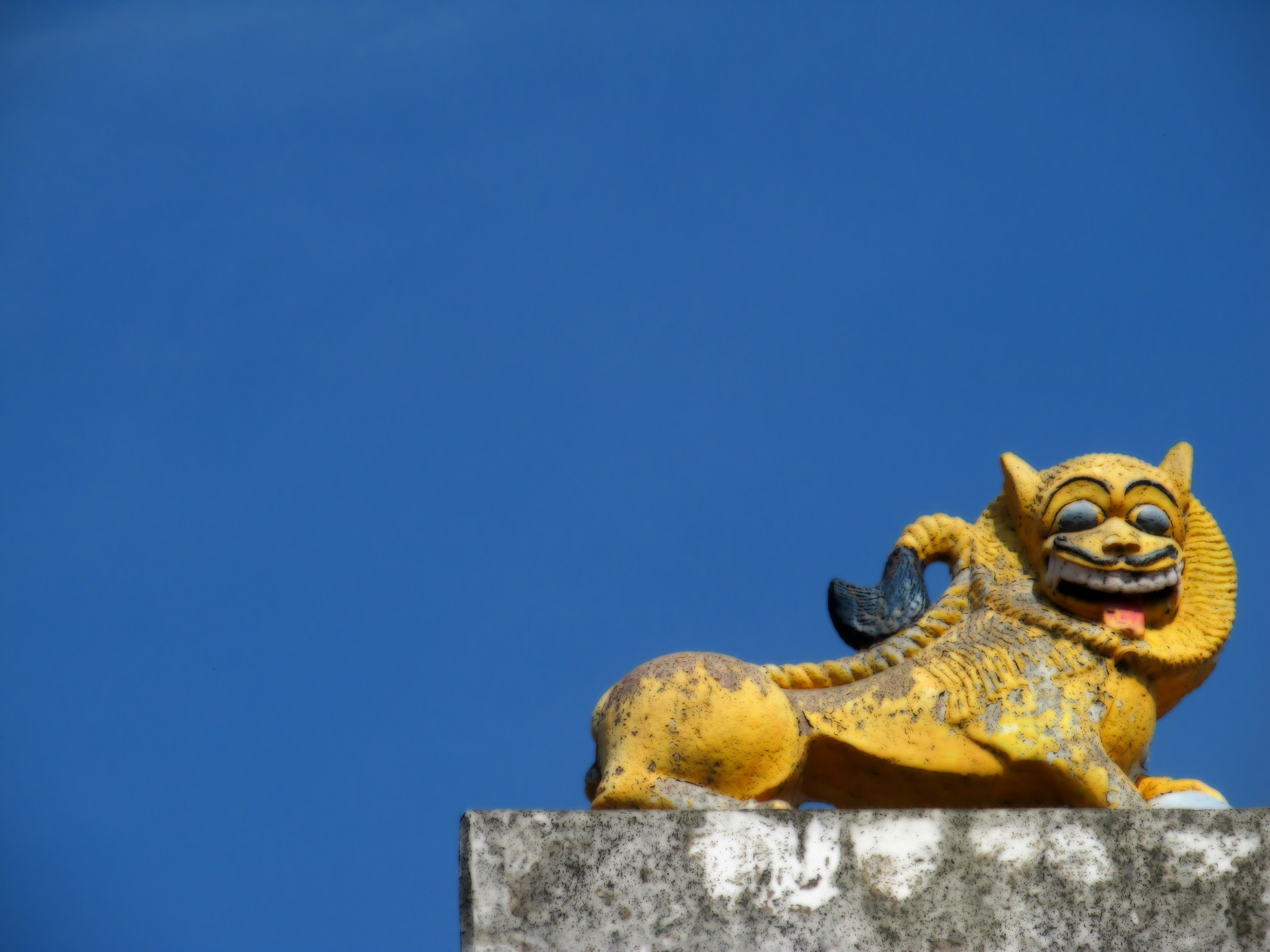
A lion sculpture atop the celebrated Venugopala Swamy temple

Bobbili was once a zamindari estate under the rule of its most famous resident, Ramakrishna Ranga Rao of Bobbili, who was better known as the Raja of Bobbili.

== Battle of Bobbili ==
The battle of Bobbili in 1757, is one of the significant episodes in the history of the state of Andhra Pradesh. Vizianagaram kings won the war with the help of French General Marquis de Bussy.

== Demographics ==
As of 2011 Census of India, the town had a population of 56,819. The total population constitute, 28,285 males, 28,534 females and 5,693 children in the age group of 0–6 years. The average literacy rate stands at 76.66% with 39,193 literates, higher than the national average of 74%.

== Education ==
The primary and secondary school education is imparted by government, aided and private schools, under the School Education Department of the state. The medium of instruction followed by different schools are English, Telugu.

Bobbili is known for its quality education. An age old college in the form of Rajah R.S.R.K. Ranga Rao College (1962) and even older school in the form of Samsthanam High School (1864)

== Governance ==
Parliamentary and assembly constituencies

Bobbili is a parliamentary constituency in Indian Lok Sabha. It had 9,70,612 voters during the elections, held during April–May 2004 for the 14th Lok Sabha. Since 2009 Bobbili Parliamentary Constituency no longer exists and is replaced with Vizianagaram Parliamentary constituency. Bobbili is an assembly constituency in Andhra Pradesh. There are 1,20,173 registered voters in this constituency in 1999 elections.

== Industries ==
Andhra Pradesh Industrial Infrastructure Corporation has set up Industrial Development area at Bobbili in 2008. Nearly 200 units will be set up in an area of over 1,000 acres of land. The state government has spent about Rs. 20 crore is on infrastructure like roads, water supply, power transmission including a 33 kV sub-station. The major projects in the pipeline include Berry Alloys Ltd., B.K. Steels and Vizag Profiles The Growth Centre has a potential to employ 10,000 people directly and a few thousands indirectly through the ancillary industries.

== Transport ==
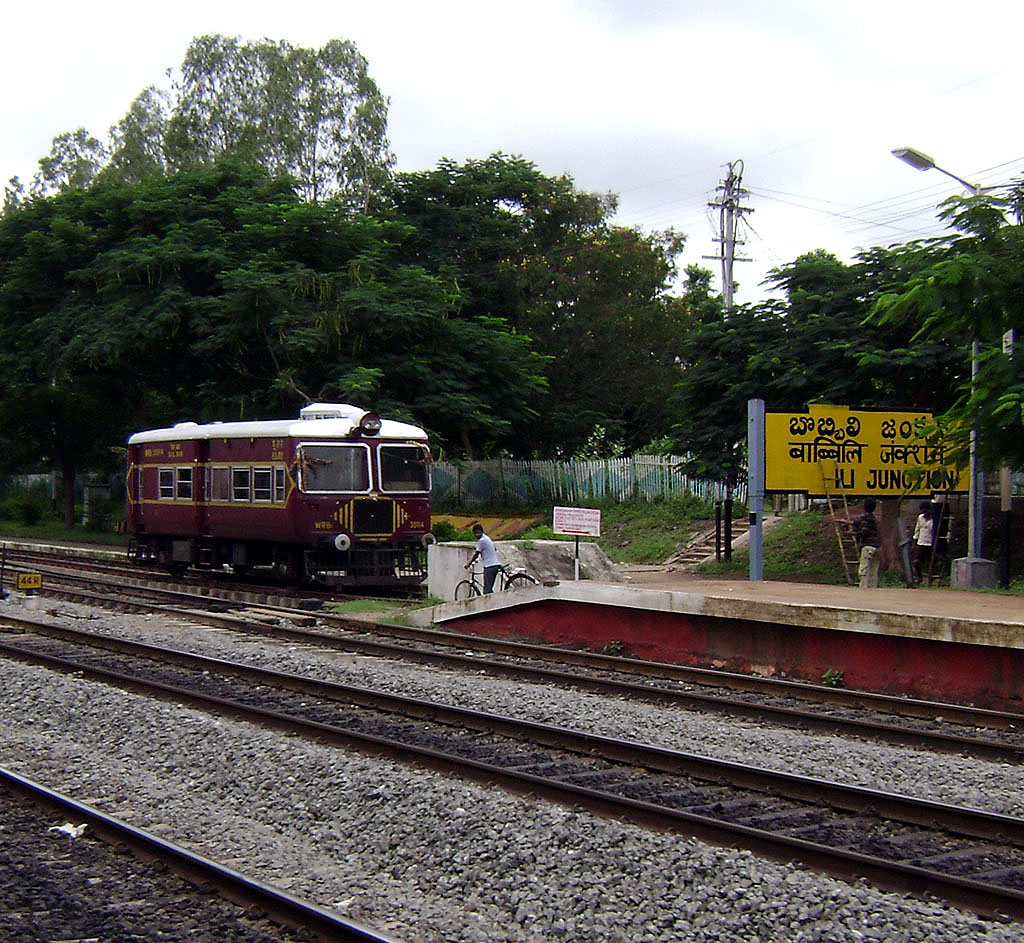
Salur-Bobbili Railbus

Bobbili Railway junction is in Visakhapatnam division of East Coast Railway zone. It is at Mallampeta (which is named after the goddess Mallamma). It is on the Vizianagaram-Raipur railway line. There is a broad-gauge railway line between Bobbili and Salur.

== See also ==
- Andhra Pradesh
- Vizianagaram district
- List of municipalities in Andhra Pradesh
