= N. T. Rama Rao filmography =

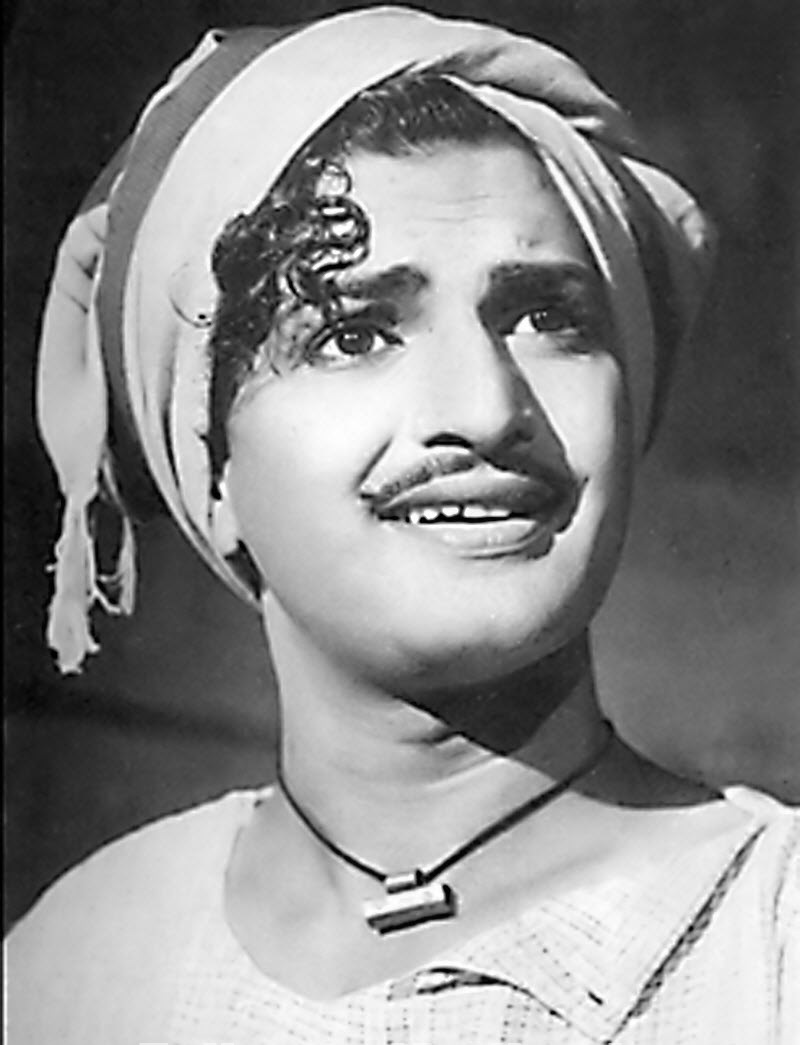
N. T. Rama Rao in the 1952 film Daasi

N. T. Rama Rao (1923–1996), commonly known by his initials NTR, was an Indian actor, screenwriter, director and producer who worked primarily in Telugu cinema. Through his over four-decade long career of almost 300 films, he was considered one of the most pivotal figures of the Telugu industry. After his debut in Mana Desam (1949) and his first lead role in Palletoori Pilla (1950), Rama Rao's performance in the fantasy film Pathala Bhairavi (1951) made him famous. His other films with Vijaya Vauhini Studios, Malliswari (1951) and Pelli Chesi Choodu (1952), were also successful, causing him to become the industry's "top star" according to Ashish Rajadhyaksha and Paul Willemen in the book Encyclopedia of Indian Cinema. He also took his first steps into film production by forming the National Art Theatre production studio in 1953.

Through the 1960s, Rama Rao became well known for his work in mythological films. After a poorly-received cameo as Krishna in Sonta Ooru (1956), his portrayal of the god in the epic Mayabazar (1957) won him praise. Rama Rao would go on to play Krishna in sixteen other films, with the role quickly becoming iconic for him. In 1958's Bhookailas, he played the demon king Ravana to critical acclaim, which was an unprecedented turn for an actor who had mostly played heroic roles up to that point. In the wake of its success, Rama Rao reprised the role in his successful directorial debut Seeta Rama Kalyanam (1961). By then, his performances, particularly his portrayal of Venkateswara in Sri Venkateswara Mahatyam the year before, caused some of his fans to ascribe divine status to the point that pilgrims would visit Rama Rao's house after going to the deity's temple. (Note: In Maverick Messiah, journalist Ramesh Kandula criticises the claim that Rama Rao's fans considered him godly as sensationalism and states that pilgrims who visited his house did not worship him.)

Later in his career, Rama Rao shifted his focus to social melodramas and vigilante films. He also delved deeper into filmmaking, forming Ramakrishna Cine Studios in 1976. The following year, Rama Rao wrote, directed and produced the first film under this banner, Daana Veera Soora Karna. The film, where he played three characters of the Hindu epic Mahabharata, namely Karna, Duryodhana and Krishna, was a commercial success and became the first Telugu film to gross over ₹2 crore (20 million); as a result, it has been considered his magnum opus. With his adoption of a new, youthful image in his other roles that year also becoming popular with audiences, 1977 has been considered Rama Rao's annus mirabilis.

He would continue starring in vigilante films, often with themes of rebellion against a corrupt system and playing dual "old-young" hero roles, which were box-office hits despite being considered cheesy and over-the-top by critics. After Rama Rao entered politics in 1982, he started to withdraw from the film industry. Having become Chief Minister of Andhra Pradesh in 1983, he took a six-year break during his first two terms, with his last role beforehand being 17th century fortune teller Potuluri Veerabrahmam in Srimadvirat Veerabrahmendra Swami Charitra (1984). Near the end of his second term, he controversially re-entered cinema by starting production of his next film Brahmarshi Viswamitra (1991) while still in office. Both this film and his following production Samrat Ashoka (1992) failed to reinvigorate his career. Rama Rao's final two films were released the year after, with Major Chandrakanth becoming a "sensational hit" and Srinatha Kavi Sarvabhoumudu flopping at the box office despite being critically praised.

== On-screen roles ==
- All films are in Telugu, unless otherwise noted.

Year	Film	Role(s)	Notes	Ref(s)
1949	Mana Desam	Police inspector		
1950	Shavukaru	Satyam		
1950	Palletoori Pilla	Jayanth		
1950	Maaya Rambha	Nalakubharudu	Simultaneously shot in Tamil	
1950	Samsaaram	Raghu		
1951	Pathala Bhairavi	Thota Ramudu	Simultaneously shot in Tamil; Dubbed in Hindi with two songs reshot in colour	
1951	Malliswari	Nagaraju		
1952	Pelli Chesi Choodu	Venkataramana	Simultaneously shot in Tamil as Kalyanam Panni Paar	
1952	Daasi	Ramaiah		
1952	Palletooru	Chandram		
1953	Velaikari Magal	Ramaiah	Tamil film	
1953	Ammalakkalu	Kumar	Simultaneously shot in Tamil as Marumagal	
1953	Pichi Pullayya	Pullayya		
1953	Chandirani	Kishore	Simultaneously shot in Tamil and Hindi	
1954	Chandraharam	Chandan Raju	Simultaneously shot in Tamil	
1954	Vaddante Dabbu	Shyam	Simultaneously shot in Tamil as Panam Paduthum Padu	
1954	Thodu Dongalu	Paramesam	Also producer	
1954	Rechukka	Kannaiah / Kumara Rayala (Note: Rama Rao played a single character with two or more names.)		
1954	Raju Peda	Poligadu		
1954	Sangham	Raja		
1954	Aggi Ramudu	Aggi Ramudu / Kumar		
1954	Parivartana	Ananda Rao		
1954	Iddaru Pellalu	Mallaiah		
1955	Missamma	M. T. Rao		
1955	Vijaya Gauri	Gunasagara		
1955	Cherapakura Chedevu	Mohan		
1955	Jayasimha	Jayasimha / Bhavani Prasad		
1955	Kanyasulkam	Girisam		
1955	Santhosham	Anand / Paramanand (Note: Rama Rao played two or more characters.)	Simultaneously shot in Hindi as Naya Aadmi (1956)	
1956	Tenali Ramakrishna	Sri Krishnadevaraya	Simultaneously shot in Tamil as Tenali Raman	
1956	Chintamani	Bellvamangaludu		
1956	Jayam Manade	Pratap		
1956	Sonta Ooru	Madhav		
1956	Uma Sundari	Vijaya Rayalu		
1956	Marma Veeran		Tamil film, Cameo	
1956	Chiranjeevulu	Mohan		
1956	Sri Gauri Mahatyam	Balaveerudu		
1956	Penki Pellam	Raju		
1956	Charana Daasi	Dr. Chandra Shekar		
1957	Bhagya Rekha	Ravi		
1957	Mayabazar	Krishnudu	Simultaneously shot in Tamil	
1957	Veera Kankanam	Veera Mohan		
1957	Sankalpam	Raghu		
1957	Vinayaka Chaviti	Krishnudu		
1957	Bhale Ammayilu	Anand		
1957	Sati Anasuya	Kaushikudu		
1957	Sarangadhara	Sarangadharudu		
1957	Kutumba Gowravam	Gopalam		
1957	Panduranga Mahatyam	Pundarikudu	Also producer	
1958	Anna Thammudu	Ravi		
1958	Bhookailas	Ravanudu		
1958	Sobha	Raja		
1958	Raja Nandini	Jayachandrudu		
1958	Manchi Manasuku Manchi Rojulu	Raju		
1958	Karthavarayuni Katha	Karthavaraya		
1958	Inti Guttu	Gopal		
1958	Sampoorna Ramayanam	Ramar	Tamil film	
1959	Appu Chesi Pappu Koodu	Raja		
1959	Rechukka Pagatichukka	Vijay Kumar	Simultaneously shot in Tamil as Raja Sevai	
1959	Sabhash Ramudu	Ramachandra Rao		
1959	Daiva Balam	Chandrasenudu		
1959	Bala Nagamma	Karyavardhi		
1959	Vachina Kodalu Nachindi	Ravi		
1959	Banda Ramudu	Ramu		
1960	Sri Venkateswara Mahatyam	Venkateswara Swamy (Note: Rama Rao played multiple forms of the same character, such as an avatar.)		
1960	Raja Makutam	Pratap	Simultaneously shot in Tamil	
1960	Rani Ratnaprabha	Amara Simhudu		
1960	Devanthakudu	Sundar		
1960	Vimala	Vijay Kumar / Gopalam		
1960	Deepavali	Krishnudu		
1960	Bhatti Vikramarka	Vikramarka Maharaju		
1960	Kadeddulu Ekaram Nela	Ramudu		
1960	Bhakta Raghunath	Krishnudu	Guest appearance	
1961	Seeta Rama Kalyanam	Ravanudu	Also director	
1961	Intiki Deepam Illale	Raja Shekaram		
1961	Indrajeet (Sati Sulochana)	Meghanadhudu		
1961	Pendli Pilupu	Madhu		
1961	Santha	Srinivas		
1961	Jagadeka Veeruni Katha	Pratap		
1961	Kalasi Vunte Kaladu Sukham	Kishtaiah		
1961	Taxi Ramudu	Ramu		
1962	Gulebakavali Katha	Vijayudu		
1962	Gaali Medalu	Krishna		
1962	Tiger Ramudu	Ramu		
1962	Bhishma	Bheeshmudu		
1962	Dakshayagnam	Sivudu	100th Film	
1962	Gundamma Katha	Anjaneya Prasad / Anji		
1962	Mahamantri Timmarusu	Sri Krishnadevarayalu		
1962	Swarna Manjari	Chandrabhanu		
1962	Rakta Sambandham	Raju / Raja Shekaram		
1962	Aatma Bandhuvu	Rangadu		
1963	Sri Krishnarjuna Yuddhamu	Krishnudu		
1963	Irugu Porugu	Ravi		
1963	Pempudu Koothuru	Raghu		
1963	Valmiki	Raksha / Valmiki		
1963	Savati Koduku	Seshu		
1963	Lava Kusa	Ramudu	Simultaneously shot in Tamil	
1963	Paruvu-Prathishta	Raju		
1963	Aapta Mitrulu	Prakash		
1963	Bandipotu	Narasimham		
1963	Lakshadhikari	Varaprasad		
1963	Sri Tirupatamma Katha	Gopayya		
1963	Nartanasala	Arjunudu		
1963	Manchi Chedu	Gopi		
1964	Karnan	Krishnan	Tamil film, Cameo	
1964	Gudi Gantalu	Vaasu		
1964	Marmayogi	Prabhakar		
1964	Kalavari Kodalu	Dr. Anand		
1964	Desa Drohulu	Ramu		
1964	Ramudu Bheemudu	Ramudu / Bheemudu		
1964	Sri Satyanarayana Mahathyam	Satyanarayana Swamy / Satyadas		
1964	Aggi Pidugu	Raja / Madhav		
1964	Dagudu Moothalu	Sundarayya		
1964	Sabhash Suri	Suryam		
1964	Babruvahana	Arjunudu		
1964	Vivaha Bandham	Chandra Shekar		
1964	Manchi Manishi	Venu		
1964	Vaarasatwam	Raghu		
1964	Bobbili Yuddham	Raja Damerla Gopalakrishna Rangaravanayudu		
1964	Ramadasu	Ramudu	Guest role	
1965	Naadi Aada Janme	Bhaskar		
1965	Pandava Vanavasam	Bheemudu		
1965	Dorikithe Dongalu	Nandan Rao / Agneyam		
1965	Mangamma Sapatham	Raja / Vijay		
1965	Satya Harischandra	Harishchandrudu		
1965	Thodu Needa	Gopi		
1965	Prameelarjuneeyam	Arjunudu		
1965	Devata	Prasad		
1965	Veerabhimanyu	Krishnudu		
1965	Visala Hrudayalu	Shankar		
1965	C. I. D.	Ravi		
1965	Aada Brathuku	Raja		
1966	Sri Krishna Pandaveeyam	Duryodhanudu / Krishnudu	Also producer and screenwriter	
1966	Palnati Yudham	Palnati Brahmanaidu		
1966	Shakuntala	Dushyantudu		
1966	Paramanandayya Sishyula Katha	Nandivardhana Maharaju		
1966	Srikakula Andhra Maha Vishnu Katha	Vallabha Devudu		
1966	Mangalasutram	Raju		
1966	Aggi Barata	Raja		
1966	Sangeeta Lakshmi	Venu		
1966	Sri Krishna Tulabharam	Krishnudu		
1966	Pidugu Ramudu	Ramu		
1966	Adugu Jaadalu	Dr. Vijay		
1966	Dr. Anand	Dr. Anand / Heart Patient		
1967	Gopaludu Bhoopaludu	Raja / Gopi		
1967	Nirdoshi	Anand Rao / Sundaram		
1967	Kanchu Kota	Surendra		
1967	Bhuvana Sundari Katha	Chandra Senudu		
1967	Ummadi Kutumbam	Ramu		
1967	Bhama Vijayam	Jaya Chandra		
1967	Nindu Manasulu	Raju		
1967	Stree Janma	Shekar		
1967	Sri Krishnavataram	Krishnudu / Vishnu		
1967	Punyavathi	Prakash		
1967	Aada Paduchu	Satyam		
1967	Chikkadu Dorakadu	Chikkadu		
1968	Uma Chandi Gowri Shankarula Katha	Sivudu		
1968	Niluvu Dopidi	Ramu		
1968	Thalli Prema	Keshava Rao		
1968	Tikka Sankaraiah	Mohan / Shankaram		
1968	Ramu	Raja		
1968	Kalisochina Adrushtam	Prakash		
1968	Ninne Pelladata	Umapathi		
1968	Bhagya Chakramu	Vikram		
1968	Nene Monaganni	Vamsi		
1968	Baghdad Gaja Donga	Abbu / Prince Faruk		
1968	Nindu Samsaram	Bhaskar		
1969	Varakatnam	Devasimha	Also director and writer	
1969	Kathanayakudu	Saradhi		
1969	Bhale Mastaru	Madhu / Prof. Madhusudhan Rao		
1969	Gandikota Rahasyam	Raja / Jayanth		
1969	Vichitra Kutumbam	Rajashekaram		
1969	Kadaladu Vadaladu	Vikram		
1969	Nindu Hrudayalu	Gopi		
1969	Bhale Thammudu	Ram Prasad (Paul) / Shyam Prasad (Note: Rama Rao played two or more characters, with at least one having multiple names.)		
1969	Aggi Veerudu	Yeshovardhanudu		
1969	Mathru Devata	Srinivasa Rao		
1969	Ekaveera	Sethupathi		
1970	Thalla? Pellama?	Sudhakar	Also director, story and scriptwriter	
1970	Lakshmi Kataksham	Kulavardhanudu		
1970	Ali Baba 40 Dongalu	Ali Baba		
1970	Pettandarulu	Chandram		
1970	Vijayam Manade	Pratap		
1970	Chitti Chellelu	Raja		
1970	Mayani Mamata	Madhu / Madhavaaiah		
1970	Marina Manishi	Raju		
1970	Kodalu Diddina Kapuram	Ranga	Also screenwriter	
1970	Oke Kutumbham	Ramu / Rahimu		
1971	Thirudatha Thirudan		Tamil film	
1971	Sri Krishna Vijayamu	Krishnudu		
1971	Nindu Dampathulu	Ramu		
1971	Rajakota Rahasyam	Vijay		
1971	Jeevitha Chakram	Raja		
1971	Raithu Bidda	Ramu		
1971	Kannan Karunai	Krishnan	Tamil film; also director	
1971	Adrusta Jathakudu	Prasad		
1971	Chinnanati Snehitulu	Srinivasa Rao		
1971	Pavitra Hrudayalu	Ravindra Babu		
1971	Sri Krishna Satya	Ramudu / Krishnudu / Ravanudu		
1972	Sri Krishnanjaneya Yuddham	Krishnudu		
1972	Kula Gowravam	Raja Ramachandra Prasad / Raghunath Prasad / Shankar		
1972	Badi Panthulu	Raghava Rao		
1973	Errakota Veerudu	Pratap	Voiced by Dasaratha Ramireddy	
1973	Dabbuki Lokam Dasoham	Ramu		
1973	Desoddharakulu	Gopal Rao		
1973	Dhanama? Daivama?	Ramachandra Rao		
1973	Devudu Chesina Manushulu	Ramakrishna		
1973	Vaade Veedu	Kondadu / Rambabu		
1974	Palleturi Chinnodu	Lakhchanna		
1974	Ammayi Pelli	Raghuram		
1974	Manushullo Devudu	Raja / Rajashekaram		
1974	Tatamma Kala	Ramaiah / Musalaiah		
1974	Nippulanti Manishi	Inspector Vijay		
1974	Deeksha	Raja		
1975	Sri Ramanjaneya Yuddham	Ramudu		
1975	Kathanayakuni Katha	Ramu		
1975	Samsaaram	Raghava Rao		
1975	Ramuni Minchina Ramudu	Dr. Ramu / Major Raghu		
1975	Annadammula Anubandham	Vijay		
1975	Maya Maschindra	Vishnuvu / Saint Maschindra		
1975	Teerpu			
1975	Eduruleni Manishi	Vijay		
1976	Vemulawada Bheemakavi			
1976	Aradhana	Gopi		
1976	Manushulanta Okkate	Ramu / "Raja" Rajendrababu		
1976	Magaadu	Vijay		
1976	Neram Nadi Kadu Akalidi	Vikram		
1976	Bangaru Manishi	Venu		
1976	Maa Daivam	Raju		
1976	Manchiki Maro Peru	Jayanth		
1977	Daana Veera Soora Karna	Karnudu / Krishnudu / Duryodhanudu	Also director, producer and writer	
1977	Adavi Ramudu	Ramu		
1977	Edureeta	Madhu		
1977	Chanakya Chandragupta	Chandragupta Maurya	Also director, producer and writer	
1977	Maa Iddari Katha	Satyam / Vishwam		
1977	Yamagola	Satyam		
1978	Sati Savitri	Yamudu		
1978	Melu Kolupu	Shekhar		
1978	Akbar Salim Anarkali	Akbar	Also director and screenwriter	
1978	Rama Krishnulu	Ramu		
1978	Yuga Purushudu	Rajesh / Kalyan		
1978	Rajaputra Rahasyam	Gajendra		
1978	Simha Baludu	Rajendra		
1978	Sri Rama Pattabhishekam	Ramudu / Ravanudu	Also director, story and scriptwriter	
1978	Sahasavanthudu	Raghu		
1978	Lawyer Viswanath	Lawyer Viswanath		
1978	KD No:1	Krishna		
1979	Driver Ramudu	Ramu		
1979	Maavari Manchitanam	Naresh Dutt / Amit Roy		
1979	Sri Madvirata Parvam	Krishnudu / Arjunudu / Duryodhanudu / Kichakudu	Also director, producer and screenwriter	
1979	Vetagaadu	Raja		
1979	Tiger	“Tiger" Raja		
1979	Sri Tirupati Venkateswara Kalyanam	Venkateswara Swamy	Also director	
1979	Srungara Ramudu	Rajaram		
1979	Yugandhar	Yugandhar / Vijay		
1980	Challenge Ramudu	Vijayaram		
1980	Circus Ramudu	Ramu / Raja		
1980	Aatagadu	Gopi		
1980	Superman	Raja		
1980	Rowdy Ramudu Konte Krishnudu	Ramu		
1980	Sardar Papa Rayudu	Sardar Paparayudu / Inspector Ramu		
1980	Sarada Ramudu	Madhav		
1981	Prema Simhasanam	Raja / Anand Varma		
1981	Gaja Donga	Raja / Krishna		
1981	Evaru Devudu			
1981	Tirugu Leni Manishi	Raja		
1981	Satyam Shivam	Shivam		
1981	Viswaroopam	Viswam / Chittaiah		
1981	Aggi Ravva	Ramu	Also producer	
1981	Kondaveeti Simham	S. P. Ranjith Kumar / Ramu		
1981	Maha Purushudu	Vijay		
1982	Anuraga Devatha	Ramu		
1982	Kaliyuga Ramudu	Ramu		
1982	Justice Chowdary	Justice R. K. Chowdary / Ramu		
1982	Bobbili Puli	Major Chakradhar		
1982	Vayyari Bhamalu Vagalamari Bhartalu	Peddababu Prabhakar		
1982	Naa Desam	Bharat		
1983	Simham Navvindi	Narasimham		
1983	Chanda Sasanudu	Hari Chandra Prasad / Raja	Also director and writer	
1984	Srimadvirat Veerabrahmendra Swami Charitra	Potuluri Veerabrahmam / Buddhudu / Adi Shankara / Ramanuja / Vemana		
1991	Brahmarshi Viswamitra	Viswamitrudu / Ravanudu	Also Director / Story/ Screenwriter / Editor	
1992	Samrat Ashoka	Ashoka / Chanakya	Also Director / Story / Screenwriter / Editor	
1993	Major Chandrakanth	Major Chandrakanth		
1993	Srinatha Kavi Sarvabhowmudu	Srinatha		

== Off-screen roles ==
Year	Film	Story	Screenplay	Direction	Editor	Notes
1961	Seetharama Kalyanam			Yes		
1962	Gulebakavali Katha			Yes		
1966	Sri Krishna Pandaveeyam		Yes	Yes		
1967	Ummadi Kutumbam	Yes	Yes			
1969	Varakatnam	Yes	Yes	Yes		
1970	Thalla? Pellama?	Yes	Yes	Yes		
1970	Kodalu Diddina Kapuram		Yes			
1971	Kannan Karunai			Yes		Tamil film
1972	Kula Gowravam		Yes			
1974	Tatamma Kala	Yes	Yes	Yes		
1976	Vemulawada Bheemakavi	Yes	Yes			
1977	Daana Veera Soora Karna	Yes	Yes	Yes		
1977	Chanakya Chandragupta	Yes	Yes	Yes		
1978	Akbar Salim Anarkali	Yes	Yes	Yes		
1978	Sri Rama Pattabhishekam			Yes		
1979	Sri Madvirata Parvam	Yes	Yes	Yes		
1979	Sri Tirupati Venkateswara Kalyanam	Yes	Yes	Yes		
1983	Chanda Sasanudu		Yes	Yes		
1984	Srimadvirat Veerabrahmendra Swami Charitra	Yes	Yes	Yes		
1991	Brahmarshi Viswamitra	Yes	Yes	Yes	Yes	
1992	Samrat Ashoka	Yes	Yes	Yes	Yes	

== Production credits ==
Year	Film
1953	Pichi Pullayya
1954	Thodu Dongalu
1955	Jayasimha
1957	Panduranga Mahatyam
1961	Seetharama Kalyanam
1962	Gulebakavali Katha
1966	Sri Krishna Pandaveeyam
1967	Ummadi Kutumbam
1969	Varakatnam
1970	Thalla? Pellama?
1970	Kodalu Diddina Kapuram
1971	Sri Krishna Satya
1972	Kula Gowravam
1974	Tatamma Kala
1975	Vemulawada Bheemakavi
1977	Daana Veera Soora Karna
1977	Chanakya Chandragupta
1978	Sri Rama Pattabhishekam
1979	Sri Madvirata Parvam
1979	Sri Tirupati Venkateswara Kalyanam
1980	Rowdy Ramudu Konte Krishnudu
1981	Aggi Ravva
1982	Anuraga Devatha
1983	Simham Navvindi
1983	Chanda Sasanudu
1984	Srimadvirat Veerabrahmendra Swami Charitra
1991	Brahmarshi Viswamitra
1992	Samrat Ashoka

== Bibliography ==
- Bhrugubanda, Uma Maheswari (2018). Deities and Devotees: Cinema, Religion, and Politics in South India. New Delhi: Oxford University Press. doi:10.1093/oso/9780199487356.001.0001. ISBN 978-0-19-948735-6. OCLC 1079179346. Archived from the original on 24 November 2020.
- Chandrahas, K.; Lakshminarayana, K. (2019). NTR: A Biography. Hyderabad: CLS Publishers LLP. ISBN 978-8-19-400310-6.
- Kandula, Ramesh (2021). Maverick Messiah: A Political Biography of N.T. Rama Rao. Gurgaon, Haryana, India: Ebury Press. ISBN 978-0-670-09393-9. OCLC 1237107554.
- Lyden, John (2009). The Routledge Companion to Religion and Film. London: Routledge. ISBN 978-0-415-60187-0. OCLC 237881008. Archived from the original on 14 November 2020.
- Narayan, S. Venkat (1983). NTR: A Biography. New Delhi: Vikas Publishing House. ISBN 0-7069-2404-5. OCLC 10432404.
- Rajadhyaksha, Ashish; Willemen, Paul (1998) [1994]. Encyclopaedia of Indian Cinema (PDF). British Film Institute and Oxford University Press. ISBN 0-19-563579-5.
- Srinivas, S. V. (2006). "Persistence of the Feudal: Star and Film Form in Post 1970s Telugu Cinema". Journal of the Moving Image. Kolkata: Department of Film Studies, Jadavpur University. Archived from the original on 14 November 2020.
