= Nandamuri Balakrishna filmography =

Balakrishna filmography
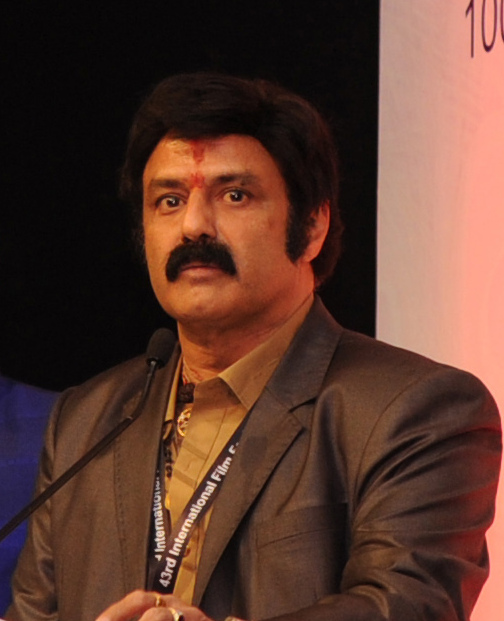
- Nandamuri Balakrishna in 2012
- Film: 109
- Web series: 1
- Hosting: 2
- Music videos: 1

Nandamuri Balakrishna is an Indian actor, film producer, politician and philanthropist who works in Telugu cinema. He entered the film industry as a child artist at the age of 14 with the film Tatamma Kala. In the mid-1980s, he graduated to acting in the lead role and soon became one of the sought after actors in Telugu cinema. In his career spanning 50 years, he has acted in over hundred films in a variety of roles. Balakrishna has received three state Nandi Awards for best acting. Balakrishna was the guest of honour at the 43rd International Film Festival of India.

== Film ==
All films are in Telugu language, unless mentioned.

Key
†	Denotes films that have not yet been released

List of Nandamuri Balakrishna film credits
Year	Title	Role	Notes	Ref.
1974	Tatamma Kala	Balakrishna	Debut film	
1974	Ram Raheem	Ramu		
1975	Annadammula Anubandham	Naveen		
1975	Vemulawada Bheemakavi	Vemulawada Bheemakavi		
1977	Daana Veera Soora Karna	Abhimanyudu		
1979	Akbar Salim Anarkali	Salim		
1979	Sri Madvirata Parvam	Abhimanyudu		
1979	Sri Tirupati Venkateswara Kalyanam	Narada Maharshi		
1980	Rowdy Ramudu Konte Krishnudu	Balakrishna		
1982	Anuraga Devatha	Prakash		
1983	Simham Navvindi	Balakrishna		
1984	Sahasame Jeevitham	Ravi	Debut as a solo lead	
1984	Disco King	Balakrishna		
1984	Janani Janmabhoomi	Ramesh		
1984	Mangammagari Manavadu	Veeranna		
1984	Palnati Puli	Raju		
1984	Srimadvirat Veerabrahmendra Swami Charitra	Sayyad / Sidda		
1984	Kathanayakudu	Ravi		
1985	Atmabhalam	Anand Kumar Bhupathi / Durga Prasad		
1985	Babai – Abbai	Bala / Balasubramanyam		
1985	Bharyabhartala Bhandam	Radha		
1985	Bhale Thammudu	Rajendra		
1985	Kattula Kondayya	Kiran		
1985	Pattabhishekam	Balu		
1986	Nippulanti Manishi	Parasuram	25th Film	
1986	Muddula Krishnayya	Krishnayya		
1986	Seetarama Kalyanam	Raja		
1986	Anasuyamma Gari Alludu	Hari Krishna		
1986	Desoddarakudu	Gopi		
1986	Kaliyuga Krishnudu	Mohana Krishna		
1986	Apoorva Sahodarulu	Arun Kumar & Ramudu (Note: Balakrishna played two characters.)	Double role	
1987	Bhargava Ramudu	Bhargav		
1987	Ramu	Ramu		
1987	Allari Krishnayya	Gopala Krishna		
1987	Sahasa Samrat	Ramudu		
1987	President Gari Abbai	Rama Krishna		
1987	Muvva Gopaludu	Gopi		
1987	Trimurtulu	Himself	Cameo	
1987	Bhanumati Gari Mogudu	Jaya Krishna		
1988	Inspector Pratap	Pratap		
1988	Donga Ramudu	Rama Krishna		
1988	Tiragabadda Telugubidda	Ravi Teja		
1988	Bharatamlo Bala Chandrudu	Balachandra		
1988	Ramudu Bheemudu	Ramudu & Bheemudu	Double role	
1988	Raktabhishekam	Pardhasaradhi		
1989	Bhale Donga	Surendra		
1989	Muddula Mavayya	Raja		
1989	Ashoka Chakravarthy	Ashok		
1989	Bala Gopaludu	Bangaru Muvva Bala Gopalam		
1990	Prananiki Pranam	Raja		
1990	Nari Nari Naduma Murari	Venkateswara Rao	50th Film	
1990	Muddula Menalludu	Raja		
1990	Lorry Driver	Bala Murali		
1991	Talli Tandrulu	Anand		
1991	Brahmarshi Viswamitra	Satya Harischandra & Dushyanta	Double role	
1991	Aditya 369	Sri Krishnadeva Rayalu & Krishna Kumar	Double role	
1992	Dharmakshetram	Beneerji		
1992	Rowdy Inspector	Ramaraju		
1992	Aswamedham	Kireeti		
1993	Nippu Ravva	Suryam		
1993	Bangaru Bullodu	Balakrishna		
1994	Bhairava Dweepam	Vijaya		
1994	Gandeevam	Raja		
1994	Bobbili Simham	Vijaya Raghava Bhupathi		
1994	Top Hero	Balu		
1995	Maatho Pettukoku	Arjun & Kishtayya	Double role	
1996	Vamsanikokkadu	Raja		
1996	Sri Krishnarjuna Vijayam	Lord Krishna & Arjuna	Double role	
1997	Muddula Mogudu	Vamsi		
1997	Peddannayya	Ramakrishna Prasad & Bhavani Prasad	Double role	
1997	Devudu	Devudu		
1998	Yuvaratna Raana	Raana / Ramu		
1998	Pavitra Prema	Manikyam		
1999	Samarasimha Reddy	Abbulu / Vaasu / Samarasimha Reddy		
1999	Sultan	Sultan & Pruthvi	Double role	
1999	Krishna Babu	Krishna Babu	75th Film	
2000	Vamsoddharakudu	Suryam		
2000	Goppinti Alludu	Murali Manohar / Bheemudu		
2001	Narasimha Naidu	Narasimha Naidu		
2001	Bhalevadivi Basu	Sagar / Prabhu		
2002	Seema Simham	Durga Prasad		
2002	Chennakesava Reddy	Chennakesava Reddy & Bharat	Double role	
2002	Yuva Rathna	—N/a	Voiceover	
2003	Palanati Brahmanaidu	Siva Sankara Satya Bhavani Prasad		
2004	Lakshmi Narasimha	Lakshmi Narasimha Swamy		
2004	Vijayendra Varma	Vijayendra Varma		
2005	Allari Pidugu	Rajith Kumar & Giri	Double role	
2006	Veerabhadra	Murali Krishna		
2007	Maharadhi	Bala/Krishna/Krish/Balayya/Balakrishna		
2008	Okka Magadu	Raghupathi Raghava Rajaram & Veera Venkata Satyanarayana Swamy	Double role	
2008	Pandurangadu	Lord Krishna & Pundarika Ranganathudu	Double role	
2009	Mitrudu	Aditya		
2010	Simha	Narasimha & Srimannarayana	Double role	
2011	Parama Veera Chakra	Jai Simha & Chakradhar	Double role	
2011	Sri Rama Rajyam	Sri Rama / Vishnu		
2012	Adhinayakudu	Harish Chandra Prasad, Rama Krishna Prasad & Bobby (Note: Balakrishna played three roles)	Triple role	
2012	Uu Kodathara? Ulikki Padathara?	Rudramaneni Narasimha Rayudu		
2012	Srimannarayana	Srimannarayana		
2014	Legend	Jaidev alias Legend & Krishna	Double role	
2015	Lion	Godse / Bose		
2016	Dictator	Chandra Sekhar Dharma / Chandu		
2017	Gautamiputra Satakarni	Gautamiputra Satakarni	100th Film	
2017	Paisa Vasool	Theda Singh / RAW Agent Balakrishna Nandamuri		
2018	Jai Simha	Narasimha		
2019	N.T.R: Kathanayakudu	N. T. Rama Rao	Also producer and writer	
2019	N.T.R: Mahanayakudu	N. T. Rama Rao	Also producer and writer	
2019	Ruler	Dharma / Arjun Prasad		
2021	Akhanda	Akhanda & Murali Krishna	Double role	
2023	Veera Simha Reddy	Veera Simha Reddy & Jai Simha Reddy	Double role	
2023	Bhagavanth Kesari	Nelakonda Bhagavanth Kesari		
2025	Daaku Maharaaj	Sitaram / Daaku Maharaaj / Nanaji		
2025	Akhanda 2: Thaandavam	Akhanda & Murali Krishna	Double role	
2026	Dada (2026 film) †	TBA	Post-Production	
2027	NBK112 †	TBA	Filming	

== Television ==
List of Nandamuri Balakrishna television credits
Year	Title	Role	Network	Ref.
2021–present	Unstoppable	Host	Aha	
2022	Telugu Indian Idol	Guest Judge	Aha	

== See also ==
- List of Indian film actors
- List of Indian male film actors
