= Sarithira Nayagan =

- Theatrical release poster
- Directed by: D. Yoganand
- Written by: A. L. Narayanan (dialogues)
- Story by: N. T. Rama Rao
- Produced by: Nandamuri Harikrishna
- Starring: Sivaji Ganesan; Sarada; Prabhu; Radha
- Cinematography: Nandamuri Mohana Krishna
- Edited by: V. Ravi
- Music by: M. S. Viswanathan
- Production company: Ramakrishna Cine Studios
- Release date: 26 May 1984
- Country: India
- Language: Tamil

Sarithira Nayagan (transl. Historical Hero) is a 1984 Indian Tamil-language action film, directed by D. Yoganand. The film stars Sivaji Ganesan, Sarada, Prabhu and Radha. The story was written by N. T. Rama Rao with his son Harikrishna producing the film. It is a remake of the 1983 Telugu film Chandasasanudu. The film was released on 26 May 1984. This was Yoganand's final film as director before his death in 2006.

== Plot ==
The plot revolves around two siblings who are forcibly separated by the villains in pursuit of their inheritance. Years later, their offspring fall in love and collaborate to unravel the mystery surrounding the death of the male lead's father.

== Cast ==
- Sivaji Ganesan as Pandiaraja
- Sarada
- Prabhu as Selvam
- Radha
- M. N. Nambiar
- Thengai Srinivasan
- Jaishankar
- P. R. Varalakshmi
- Jayamalini
- R. S. Manohar

== Soundtrack ==
Soundtrack was composed by M. S. Viswanathan, with lyrics by Vaali.

Track listing
No.	Title	Singer(s)	Length
1.	"Kudichukka"	L. R. Eswari	4:30
2.	"Theppakulathil"	S. P. Balasubrahmanyam, Vani Jairam	4:40
3.	"Eduthukka Ellame"	S. P. Balasubrahmanyam, Vani Jairam	4:41
4.	"Therinjpochu"	L. R. Eswari	4:22
Total length:			18:13

== Reception ==
Jayamanmadhan of Kalki criticised the film's screenplay for being overstuffed and confusing.
