= Ramakrishna Cine Studios =

Film studio in Hyderabad, India

Ramakrishna Cine Studios రామకృష్ణ సినీ స్టూడియోస్
- Company type: Private
- Industry: Entertainment
- Founded: 1976
- Founder: N. T. Rama Rao
- Headquarters: Nacharam, Hyderabad, Telangana, India
- Key people: N. T. Rama Rao
- Products: Films
- Services: Film production Film distribution
- Owner: N. T. Rama Rao
- Divisions: National Art Theatre; NBK Films; N. T. R. Arts; Basavaramtarakam Creations

Ramakrishna Cine Studios is a film production house and studio facility located at Nacharam, Hyderabad, India. It was constructed by N. T. Rama Rao in memory of his son Rama Krishna Sr. The first film shot in the studio was Daana Veera Soora Karna (1977).

== History ==
N. T. Rama Rao started Ramakrishna Cine Studio on Golkonda X Roads in 1976. It was closed and shifted to Nacharam. Currently known as Ramakrishna Horticultural Cine Studio, it has permanent sets which are suitable for shooting mythological films.

== Ramakrishna Cine Studios ==
=== Production House ===
Year	Film	Notes
1974	Tatamma Kala	
1975	Vemulawada Bheemakavi	
1977	Daana Veera Soora Karna	
1977	Chanakya Chandragupta	
1978	Akbar Salim Anarkali	
1978	Sri Rama Pattabhishekam	
1978	Rowdy Ramudu	
1979	Sri Madvirata Parvam	
1979	Driver Ramudu	
1979	Sri Tirupati Venkateswara Kalyanam	
1980	Rowdy Ramudu Konte Krishnudu	
1981	Aggi Ravva	
1982	Subbaraoku Koppam vachindi	
1982	Anuraga Devata	
1983	Chanda Sasanudu	
1983	Simham Navvindi	
1984	Srimadvirat Veerabrahmendra Swami Charitra	
1985	Pattabhishekam (1985 film)	
1986	Anasuyamma Gari Alludu	
1989	Brahmarshi Vishwamitra	As NTR Charity Trust
1992	Samrat Ashoka	
1993	Srinatha Kavi Sarvabhoumudu	Co-Produced with Srimathi Movie Combines
1998	Subhalekhalu	
2000	Goppinti Alludu	

=== Studio ===
1. Daana Veera Soora Karna (1977)
2. Chanakya Chandragupta (1977)
3. Sri Rama Pattabhishekam (1978)
4. Akbar Salim Anarkali (1978)
5. Sri Tirupati Venkateswara Kalyanam (1979)
6. Sri Madvirata Parvam (1979)
7. Srimadvirat Veerabrahmendra Swami Charitra (1984)
8. Brahmarshi Vishwamitra (1989)
9. Samrat Ashoka (1992)
10. NTR: Kathanayakudu (2019)
11. NTR: Mahanayakudu (2019)
12. Bimbisara (2022)

== National Art Theatre ==
Year	Film	Notes
1953	Pichi Pullayya	
1954	Thodu Dongalu	
1955	Jayasimha	
1957	Panduranga Mahatyam	
1961	Seetharama Kalyanam	
1962	Gulebakavali Katha	
1966	Paduka Pattabhishekam	
1971	Sri Krishna Satya	As R. K. Brothers

== NAT & Ramakrishna Cine Studios COMBINES ==
Year	Film	Notes
1966	Sri Krishna Pandaveeyam	
1967	Ummadi Kutumbam	
1969	Varakatnam	
1970	Thalla? Pellama?	
1970	Kodalu Diddina Kapuram	
1972	Kula Gowravam	
1976	Vanaja Girija	

== NBK Films ==
Films

Year	Film	Notes
2019	NTR: Kathanayakudu	
2019	NTR: Mahanayakudu	

Songs

- Shivashankari (Released on 60th birthday of Nandamuri Balakrishna)
- Sri Rama Dandakam by NBK (Released on 99th Birth anniversary of N. T. Rama Rao)
- Jai NTR (Released on birth centenary of N. T. Rama Rao)
