= Lorry Driver Rajakannu =

- Theatrical release poster
- Directed by: A. C. Tirulokchandar
- Screenplay by: A. C. Tirulokchandar
- Story by: Tarakarama Film Unit
- Based on: Driver Ramudu
- Produced by: Pushpa Rajan
- Starring: Sivaji Ganesan; Sripriya
- Cinematography: T. S. Vinayagam
- Edited by: B. Kanthasamy
- Music by: M. S. Viswanathan
- Production company: Raja Mahalakshmi Arts
- Release date: 3 July 1981
- Country: India
- Language: Tamil

Lorry Driver Rajakannu is a 1981 Indian Tamil-language film, directed by A. C. Tirulokchandar who also wrote the screenplay. The film stars Sivaji Ganesan and Sripriya. It is a remake of the Telugu film Driver Ramudu. The film was released on 3 July 1981.

== Plot ==
Rajakannu, a lorry driver, lives with his blind sister, Meena, who is his only family. Known for his unwavering sense of justice, Rajakannu frequently goes out of his way to help others. He befriends fellow driver Ramu, earning a loyal and devoted companion. Meanwhile, Rajakannu falls in love with Kannamma, a short-tempered food stall owner, while Meena becomes engaged to Inspector Shankar.

Trouble arises when Rajakannu is falsely implicated in a smuggling operation orchestrated by Jaganath and his son, Kamal. Determined to clear his name, Rajakannu teams up with Ramu, Kannamma, and his lorry cleaner, Periyathambi, to expose the true culprits and bring them to justice.

== Cast ==
- Sivaji Ganesan as Rajakannu
- Sripriya as Kannamma
- M. N. Nambiar as Jaganath
- Major Sundarrajan as Ramu
- Sathyakala as Meena
- Suruli Rajan as Periyathambi
- Jai Ganesh as Shankar
- Kanchana as Seetha
- Manorama as Paapa
- Jayamalini
- Ceylon Manohar
- Prem Anand as Kamal

== Soundtrack ==
Soundtrack was composed by M. S. Viswanathan & All songs were written by Vaali.

Song	Singers	Lyrics
"Vetkappadavo"	S. P. Balasubrahmanyam, S. Janaki	Vaali
"Ennenbadho Aedenbado"	S. P. Balasubrahmanyam	Vaali
"Ennenbadho Aedenbado"	Vani Jairam	Vaali
"Singari Neethan"	S. P. Balasubrahmanyam	Vaali
"Oru Kuthala Aruvi Kudisai"	L. R. Eswari, T. M. Soundararajan	Vaali
"Singara Ponnoda Selaiyil"	S. P. Balasubrahmanyam, S. Janaki	Vaali

== Reception ==
Sindhu and Jeeva, reviewing for Kalki, criticised the film for being formulaic and lacking newness.
