= Sri Rama Pattabhishekam =

Film directed by N. T. Rama Rao

- Theatrical release poster
- Directed by: N. T. Rama Rao
- Written by: Samudrala Jr.
- Produced by: N. T. Rama Rao
- Starring: N. T. Rama Rao; Sangeeta; Jamuna
- Cinematography: Kannappa
- Edited by: G. D. Joshi
- Music by: Pendyala Nageswara Rao
- Production company: Ramakrishna Cine Studios
- Release date: 7 September 1978
- Running time: 196 minutes
- Country: India
- Language: Telugu

Sri Rama Pattabhishekam (transl. Coronation of Lord Rama) is a 1978 Indian Telugu-language Hindu mythological film directed and produced by N. T. Rama Rao under the Ramakrishna Cine Studios banner. Based on the Ramayana, the film stars Rama Rao, Sangeeta and Jamuna with music composed by Pendyala Nageswara Rao.

== Cast ==
- N. T. Rama Rao as Rama and Ravana
- Sangeeta as Sita
- Jamuna as Mandodari
- Ramakrishna as Lakshmana
- Satyanarayana as Bharata
- Prabhakar Reddy as Dasaratha
- Sridhar as Guhudu
- Arjan Janardhan Rao as Hanuman
- Tyagaraju as Kumbhakarna
- Chalapathi Rao as Indrajit
- Kanchana as Kaikeyi
- Anjali Devi as Shabari
- Suryakantham as Manthara
- Chandrakala as Kausalya
- Halam as Shurpanakha

== Soundtrack ==
Sri Rama Pattabhishekam

Film score by Pendyala Nageswara Rao
- Released: 1978
- Genre: Soundtrack
- Label: EMI Columbia
- Producer: Pendyala Nageswara Rao

The music was composed by Pendyala Nageswara Rao.

S. No	Song title	Lyrics	Singers	length
1	"Rajuavvunate Mana Ramude"	Devulapalli	S. P. Balasubrahmanyam, P. Susheela	4:39
2	"Ee Gangakentha Digulu"	Devulapalli	S. P. Balasubrahmanyam	4:24
3	"Anna Idhi Nijamena"	Devulapalli	V. Ramakrishna	3:06
4	"Lathalaga Oogevollu"	Devulapalli	S. Janaki	4:00
5	"Vinndura Vinnagalara"	Devulapalli	V. Ramakrishna	0:52
6	"Prathi Konda"	Devulapalli	P. Susheela	3:56
7	"Papini Batti"	Devulapalli	V. Ramakrishna	2:21
8	"Aalapinchana Eevela"	C. Narayana Reddy	P. Susheela	6:28
9	"Ata Lankalona"	Devulapalli	V. Ramakrishna	4:26

== Reception ==
Venkatrao of Andhra Patrika in his review dated 11 September 1978 appreciated the film's portrayal of Ravana. He felt that scenes such as Ravana teaching military tactics to Lakshmana despite knowing that he's Rama's aid were thought-provoking. Sarada writing for Zamin Ryot on 22 September 1978 was critical of Rama Rao for picking up similar roles in his films. She opined that Rama Rao had hardly shown any improvement in his acting and directing ability.
