= Raja Mariyadhai =

- Poster
- Directed by: Karthick Raghunath
- Screenplay by: Vietnam Veedu Sundaram
- Story by: D. Yoganand
- Produced by: A. M. Ismail
- Starring: Sivaji Ganesan; Karthik; Jeevitha
- Cinematography: Ashok Choudhury
- Edited by: Raja Bhaskar
- Music by: Shankar–Ganesh
- Production company: Kaiser Creations
- Release date: 14 January 1987
- Country: India
- Language: Tamil

Raja Mariyadhai (transl. The Royal respect) is a 1987 Indian Tamil-language comedy drama film directed by Karthick Raghunath. The film stars Sivaji Ganesan, Karthik, and Jeevitha. It is a remake of the Telugu film Simham Navvindi. The film was released on 14 January 1987.

== Plot ==
Rajasekar is an industrialist with strict expectations of his employees and those around him. Raghuram, one of his employees, acts as an informant, constantly reporting on his colleagues to gain favor with the boss. He also hides his relationship with his girlfriend, Vaidehi, as Rajasekar is opposed love and expects Raghuram to remain a bachelor. Fed up with waiting, Vaidehi insists on marriage. The two marry in secret and, after lying to Rajasekar, travel to Ooty for their honeymoon. Confusion ensues when Rajasekar also arrives in Ooty, meets Vaidehi, and begins to see her as a surrogate daughter.

== Cast ==
- Sivaji Ganesan as Rajasekar
- Karthik as Raghuram
- Jeevitha as Vaidehi
- Kallapetti Singaram as Ramanathan
- Janagaraj as Hanumanthu
- Senthil as Watchman
- Charuhasan as Dr Shankar
- Oru Viral Krishna Rao as Head Clerk
- Sadhana as Meena
- Disco Shanti as Disco Shanthi
- Anuradha as Anuradha
- Baby Sonia as baby Meena

== Soundtrack ==
The soundtrack was composed by Shankar–Ganesh and the lyrics were written by Vairamuthu.

Track listing
No.	Title	Singer(s)	Length
1.	"Chinnanjiru Annam Ondru"	Malaysia Vasudevan
2.	"Pada Pada Pada Ena Paranthathu Paravai"	S. P. Balasubrahmanyam, S. P. Sailaja
3.	"Vannakkiliye Vadi Veliye"	K. J. Yesudas, K. S. Chithra
4.	"Naanthaane Disco Shanthi"	Vani Jairam, S. P. Sailaja

== Reception ==
Jayamanmadhan of Kalki praised the acting of Sivaji Ganesan and Karthik, the humour, and Shankar–Ganesh's music. However, he criticized the item numbers and the emotional flashback of Ganesan, calling them unnecessary. He felt the film could have been a full-length comedy film if this flashback had not been included.
