= Nandamuri Mohana Krishna =

Indian cinematographer

- Born: Chennai, India
- Occupations: Director of Photography, Cinematographer
- Years active: 1983-2000
- Spouse: Nandamuri Shanti (m. 1981)
- Children: son, Taraka Ratna; daughter, Rupa
- Family: Nandamuri family

Nandamuri Mohana Krishna is an Indian cinematographer known for his works in Telugu cinema. He made his breakthrough as a film cinematographer with his father N. T. Rama Rao's Chanda Sasanudu (1983), which was also remade in Tamil as Sarithira Nayagan (1984) for which Mohana was also the cinematographer. Subsequently, he has continued to collaborate with his father on other projects.

== Early and personal life ==
Nandamuri Mohana Krishna was born in Madras (present-day Chennai, Tamil Nadu) to Telugu actor and three-time Chief Minister of Andhra Pradesh N. T. Rama Rao and his wife Basavatarakam. Actors Nandamuri Balakrishna, and Nandamuri Harikrishna are his brothers. Harikrishna's sons Nandamuri Kalyan Ram and N. T. Rama Rao Jr., and Mohana Krishna's son Taraka Ratna are also actors in the Telugu cinema. Mohana Krishna's younger brother Nandamuri Ramakrishna Jr. is a film producer.

Mohana Krishna's son Taraka Ratna died on 18 February 2023, at the age of 39, while undergoing treatment in Bangalore. He had spent twenty-three days in the hospital in critical condition.

== Selected filmography ==
As cinematographer
| Year | Title | Language(s) | Notes |
|---|---|---|---|
| 1983 | Chanda Sasanudu | Telugu | |
| 1984 | Sarithira Nayagan | Tamil | |
| 1986 | Anasuyamma Gari Alludu | Telugu | |
| 1988 | Ramudu Bheemudu | Telugu | |
| 1988 | Gharwali Baharwali | Hindi | |
| 1991 | Brahmarshi Viswamitra | Telugu | |
| 1993 | Srinatha Kavi Sarvabhoumudu | Telugu | |
| 2000 | Goppinti Alludu | Telugu | |
