= Kula Gowravam =

- Theatrical release poster
- Directed by: Peketi Sivaram; N. T. Rama Rao (Supervision)
- Written by: Samudrala Jr (dialogues)
- Screenplay by: N. T. Rama Rao
- Story by: N. T. Rama Rao; G. Balasubramanyam (Main story)
- Based on: Kula Gourava (1971)
- Produced by: N. Trivikrama Rao
- Starring: N. T. Rama Rao; Jayanthi; Aarathi
- Cinematography: Marcus Bartley
- Edited by: G. D. Joshi
- Music by: T. G. Lingappa
- Production companies: Ramakrishna Cine Studios & N.A.T. Combines
- Release date: 28 September 1972
- Country: India
- Language: Telugu

Kula Gowravam (transl. Honour of the Caste) is a 1972 Telugu-language drama film produced by N. Trivikrama Rao under the Ramakrishna Cine Studios and N.A.T. Combines banner and directed by Peketi Sivaram with the supervision by N. T. Rama Rao. It stars N. T. Rama Rao, Jayanthi, Aarathi with music composed by T. G. Lingappa. The film is a remake of director's own 1971 Kannada film Kula Gourava.

== Cast ==
- N. T. Rama Rao as Raja Ramachandra Prasad, Raghunath Prasad & Shankar (Triple role)
- Jayanthi as Seeta
- Aarathi as Radha
- V. Nagayya
- Padmanabham
- Raavi Kondala Rao
- Mada
- Chalapathi Rao
- Sarathi
- Sandhya Rani
- Ramadevi

== Soundtrack ==
Kula Gowravam

Film score by T. G. Lingappa
- Released: 1972
- Genre: Soundtrack
- Producer: T. G. Lingappa

Music composed by T. G. Lingappa.

S. No.	Song title	Lyrics	Singers	length
1	"Happy Life"	Kosaraju	Raghavan, L. R. Eswari	2:43
2	"Ennikalalu Kannanura"	C. Narayana Reddy	P. Susheela	3:11
3	"Kulam Kulam"	Kosaraju	Pithapuram, L. R. Eswari	
4	"Kalagantinani"	C. Narayana Reddy	S. P. Balasubrahmanyam, P. Susheela	
5	"Desamante Nuvvu Kaadu"	C. Narayana Reddy	P. Susheela	
6	"Maatrutvamlone Vundhi"	Kosaraju	Ghantasala, P. Susheela	3:07
7	"Thera Chaapavantidhi"	C. Narayana Reddy	K. J. Yesudas	3:08
8	"Inthe Inthe"	Kosaraju	S. P. Balasubrahmanyam, S. Janaki	
9	"Hello Hello Doctor"	Kosaraju	Ghantasala, P. Susheela	2:51
