= Samrat Ashoka =

- DVD Cover
- Directed by: N. T. Rama Rao
- Written by: Netyam Ratan Babu(dialogues)
- Screenplay by: N. T. Rama Rao
- Based on: Life of Ashoka
- Produced by: N. T. Rama Rao
- Starring: N. T. Rama Rao; Vani Viswanath
- Cinematography: Nandamuri Mohan Krishna
- Edited by: N. T. Rama Rao
- Music by: M. S. Viswanathan
- Production company: Ramakrishna Horticultural Cine Studios
- Release date: 28 May 1992
- Running time: 135 mins
- Country: India
- Language: Telugu

Samrat Ashoka is a 1992 Indian Telugu-language historical drama film written, produced and directed by N. T. Rama Rao under his Ramakrishna Horticultural Cine Studios banner. The film stars Rama Rao in the title role, alongside Vani Viswanath, Mohan Babu, Gummadi, Satyanarayana, and Ranganath. The music was composed by M. S. Viswanathan. Despite its grandeur and historical subject, the film was a box office failure.

== Plot ==
The film is based on the life of the 3rd Mauryan Indian emperor Ashoka. It begins in Ujjain, ruled by King Rayani Rachamallu, who unwillingly performs his daughter Tishya Raksha's nuptial. Just before, Emperor Ashoka abducted the bride. Rachamallu could not abide it for association with the enslaved class. So, he ploys to assassinate Ashoka via Tishya. On the verge, Tishya detects him as the same stranger she crushed and spins back.

Once on his hunt, Emperor Bindusara spots & wedlocks Sage Kaushila's daughter Subhadrangi / Dharma and is blessed with Ashoka. However, she is hounded and classed as the underdog by her fellow wives. Plus, Ashoka's 100 siblings mock & torment him, which Dharma countenances and quits. Here, the aura of fear-defying scholar Chanakya guides her, stating Ashoka was born to succeed in his aim to unite the country under a reign. According to his mandate, Dharma raises Ashoka in a mystical cave, molding him as a gallant. Ashoka is powerless to resist the captivity and unbound like a roaring lion. Amid this, he secures Tishya from the tiger when they endear. Simultaneously, satrap Malavasimha Rudradeva binds Bindusara by the rebellion. At that point, Ashoka encounters and blames his father. Then, as remorseful, he discerns him as only one fit as Emperor and bestows him with the hierarchical sword Karthikeyam of Chandragupta Maurya. Ashoka beats Malavasimha in a duo war, who bows down and befits as his staunch. Tragically, Bindusara dies when imperialist Ashoka becomes bloodthirsty and callously decapitates all his kins. Listening to it, Tishya wholeheartedly accepts him.

Parallelly, an infuriated Rachamallu conspires with Raja Anantha Padmanabha, the Emperor of Kalinga, and fans the flames against Ashoka. Ergo, he imparts an ultimatum when an outraged Ashoka declares the war as a last step for his sovereignty. Besides, Chanakya's aura peacefully mingles in the universe. En route, Buddhist monks oppose Ashoka about his sanguinary, which he deaf ears and moves on by butchering them.

Meanwhile, Rachamallu plots to backstab him, but Tishya shields her husband by self-sacrifice. The battle erupts, which ends victoriously with the massacre. The same night, Ashoka walks into the theatre of war and takes a bloodbath, losing his men, including Malavasimha. Here, he views a blind old lady, Kartruni, who is searching for her son's corpse. Since he is a stranger to her, she seeks a favor to kill Ashoka. Here, guilt-ridden Ashoka accords his sword to Kartruni, revealing his identity when she self-sacrifices it as a curse to him. At last, Ashoka throws the sword after soul-searching and enlightens by embracing Buddhism with a proclamation that Non-Violence is the Supreme Piety. Finally, the movie ends Ashoka's Wheel of Piety, flying colors on our National Flag.

== Cast ==
- N. T. Rama Rao as Ashoka & Chanakya (Dual role)
- Vani Viswanath as Tishya Raksha
- Mohan Babu as Malavasimha Rudradeva
- Gummadi as Bouddha Parivrajaka
- Satyanarayana as Rayani Rachamallu
- Ranganath as Bindusara
- Ramakrishna as Raja Anantha Padmanabha
- Kantha Rao
- Dhulipala as Ujjayini Mahamantri
- Ratan Babu as Preggada
- Malladi as Sage Kaushila
- Bhanumathi Ramakrishna as Kartruni
- B. Saroja Devi as Karmani
- Lakshmi as Subhadrangi / Dharma

== Music ==
Samrat Ashoka

Film score by M. S. Viswanathan
- Released: 1992
- Genre: Soundtrack
- Length: 14:15
- Label: LEO Audio
- Producer: M. S. Viswanathan

Music for the film was composed by M. S. Viswanathan and the lyrics were written by C. Narayana Reddy. Audio soundtrack was released on LEO Audio label.

S. No.	Song title	Singers	length
1	"O Ramo Rama"	S. P. Balasubrahmanyam, Chitra	4:26
2	"Kinchith Kinchith"	S. P. Balasubrahmanyam, Chitra	5:24
3	"Anuraginiga"	S. P. Balasubrahmanyam, Chitra	4:25
