= Vemulawada Bheemakavi (film) =

- Theatrical release poster
- Directed by: D. Yoganand
- Written by: Samudrala Jr(dialogues)
- Screenplay by: N. T. Rama Rao
- Story by: N. T. Rama Rao
- Produced by: N. T. Rama Rao
- Starring: N. T. Rama Rao; Nandamuri Balakrishna
- Cinematography: J. Satyanarayana
- Edited by: G. D. Joshi
- Music by: Pendyala Nageswara Rao
- Production company: Ramakrishna Cine Studios
- Release date: 8 January 1976
- Country: India
- Language: Telugu

Vemulawada Bheemakavi is a 1976 Indian Telugu-language biographical film directed by D. Yoganand and produced by N. T. Rama Rao under his Ramakrishna Cine Studios banner. It stars N. T. Rama Rao, Nandamuri Balakrishna with music composed by Pendyala Nageswara Rao.

== Plot ==
The film tells the story of Vemulawada Bheemakavi, a renowned Telugu poet from the ninth century, set against a backdrop of societal oppression and superstition. The narrative begins with Machamma, a child widow, who lives a life of hardship in her brother's house. She is married to an elderly man, but he dies before they have children. Devoutly praying at the Bhimeswara temple in Vemulawada, Machamma conceives a child, but society ostracizes her, accusing her of impropriety. She gives birth to a son, Bheema, who grows up as an outcast.

As Bheema matures, he becomes aware of the suffering of others who are similarly marginalized. He challenges societal norms by asserting that all humans are equal and begins debating these ideas publicly. His confrontation with authority escalates when he attends the "Kaalipuja" festival, where he is rejected as an illegitimate child. Seeking answers, Bheema questions his mother, who directs him to Bhimeswara. He then has a divine encounter with the lord, who confirms his legitimacy and grants him the power to make his words come true.

Armed with these divine gifts, Bheema demonstrates his abilities at a gathering of poets, declaring that rice will turn to lime and sweets to frogs—both of which occur, forcing the scholars to acknowledge Machamma's purity. Following this, Bheema travels through various kingdoms, performing miracles. In one instance, the king dies before crowning his son, Kalinga Gangu, causing chaos in the kingdom. When Bheema arrives, Kalinga Gangu refuses to meet him. In anger, Bheema curses that the king will lose his kingdom within 32 days, and the prophecy comes true.

Later, feeling sympathy for the deposed king, Bheema promises that Kalinga Gangu will regain his kingdom by the next full moon. The film concludes with the resolution of this prophecy and the reaffirmation of Bheemakavi’s divine mission to challenge oppression and restore justice.

== Cast ==
- N. T. Rama Rao
- Nandamuri Balakrishna
- Satyanarayana
- Rajanala
- Kanta Rao
- Thyagaraju
- Raavi Kondala Rao
- K. V. Chalam
- K. K. Sarma
- Shavukaru Janaki
- Vijayalalitha
- Girija
- Hemalatha

== Music ==
Vemulawada Bheemakavi

Film score by Pendyala Nageswara Rao
- Released: 1975
- Genre: Soundtrack
- Length: 28:45
- Label: AVM Audio
- Producer: Pendyala Nageswara Rao

The Music was composed by Pendyala Nageswara Rao. Lyrics were written by C. Narayana Reddy. Music was released on AVM Audio Company.

| S. No. | Song title | Lyrics | Singers | length |
|---|---|---|---|---|
| 1 | "Anukuntunnanu" | Kosaraju | V. Ramakrishna, P. Susheela | 3:03 |
| 2 | "Saira Magada" | Kosaraju | P. Susheela | 3:20 |
| 3 | "Rajuvedale Sabhaku" | Kosaraju | Madhavapeddi Satyam, Tulasi Das | 6:40 |
| 4 | "Lera Lera" (Burrakatha) | Kosaraju | P. Susheela | 3:23 |
| 5 | "Jagadeesa" | Samudrala Jr. | Madhavapeddi Ramesh | 2:45 |
| 6 | "Eesaana Nenu Needana" | Samudrala Jr. | S. Janaki | 3:12 |
| 7 | "Chilakala Kolikira" | Kosaraju | P. Susheela | 3:25 |
| 8 | "Chandamama Neethoti" | Kosaraju | P. Susheela | 2:57 |
