= Tiruguleni Manishi =

- Theatrical release poster
- Directed by: K. Raghavendra Rao
- Written by: Satyanand ((dialogues)
- Produced by: K. Devi Vara Prasad
- Starring: N.T.Rama Rao; Chiranjeevi; Rati Agnihotri
- Cinematography: K. S. Prakash
- Edited by: Kotagiri Venakateswara Rao
- Music by: K. V. Mahadevan
- Production company: Devi Film Productions
- Release date: 1 April 1981
- Running time: 138 mins
- Country: India
- Language: Telugu

Tiruguleni Manishi is a 1981 Indian Telugu-language action film, produced by K. Devi Vara Prasad under the Devi Film Productions banner and directed by K. Raghavendra Rao. It stars N. T. Rama Rao, Chiranjeevi and Rati Agnihotri, with music composed by K. V. Mahadevan. The film was a disaster at the box office.

== Cast ==
- N. T. Rama Rao as Raja
- Chiranjeevi as Kishore
- Rati Agnihotri as Seeta
- Fatafat Jayalaxmi as Padma
- Satyanarayana as Nagulu
- Jaggayya as Sasibhushan Rao
- Allu Ramalingaiah as Donga Ramudu
- Bob Christo as Goon
- Mukkamala as Lawyer
- Malladi as Ramaiah
- Chidatala Appa Rao as Police Constable
- Kamila Prasad Babu as Kishore's Son

== Soundtrack ==
Tirugu Leni Manishi

Film score by K. V. Mahadevan
- Released: 1981
- Recorded: 24:41
- Genre: Soundtrack
- Producer: K. V. Mahadevan

K. V. Mahadevan chronology
Guru Sishyulu (1981)	Tirugu Leni Manishi (1981)	Aggi Ravva (1981)

Music composed by K. V. Mahadevan. Lyrics were written by Acharya Aatreya.

S.No	Song title	Singers	length
1	"Madhuram Madhuram"	S. P. Balasubrahmanyam, P. Susheela	4:13
2	"Bariloki Diganaa"	S. P. Balasubrahmanyam, P. Susheela	4:07
3	"Ravamma Ravamma"	S. P. Balasubrahmanyam, P. Susheela	3:58
4	"Ninnu Puttinchinodu"	S. P. Balasubrahmanyam, P. Susheela	3:47
5	"Entasepu Entasepu"	S. P. Balasubrahmanyam, P. Susheela	4:18
6	"Yavvanam Oka Nandanam"	S. P. Balasubrahmanyam, P. Susheela	4:18

== Reception ==
A critic from Andhra Patrika praised the performances of the cast including the Rao (Jaggayya) character's dialogues and called the Rathi-Allu Ramalingaiah combination scenes entertaining. A critic from Sitara magazine also praised the film's cast and music and wrote that the film's strange disguises, the villain's hideout resembling an ancient wizard's cave and the playsong of the heroines have become outdated.
