= Aggi Ravva =

- Theatrical release poster
- Directed by: K. Bapayya
- Written by: Gollapudi (dialogues)
- Screenplay by: K. Bapayya
- Story by: V. C. Guhanathan
- Produced by: N. T. Rama Rao
- Starring: N. T. Rama Rao; Sridevi
- Cinematography: Nandamuri Mohana Krishna
- Edited by: Ravi
- Music by: K. V. Mahadevan
- Production company: Ramakrishna Cine Studios
- Release date: 14 August 1981
- Running time: 143 mins
- Country: India
- Language: Telugu

Aggi Ravva (transl. Flame) is a 1981 Telugu-language action film, produced by N. T. Rama Rao under the Ramakrishna Cine Studios banner and directed by K. Bapayya. It stars N. T. Rama Rao and Sridevi, with music composed by K. V. Mahadevan. The film is inspired by an English movie. The film was a Hit at the box office.

== Cast ==
- N. T. Rama Rao as Ramu
- Sridevi as Vani
- Kavitha as Menaka
- Satyanarayana as Narasimham
- Mohan Babu as Inspector Suryam
- Jaggayya as I. G. Raja Shekaram
- Allu Ramalingaiah as Bhairavaiah
- Raja Babu as Vinayak
- S. Varalakshmi as Meenakshi
- Rajyalakshmi as Radha
- Sukumari as Vani's aunt
- Chandana Chowdary as Geetha

== Soundtrack ==
Aggi Ravva

Film score by K. V. Mahadevan
- Released: 1981
- Genre: Soundtrack
- Length: 28:38
- Producer: K. V. Mahadevan

K. V. Mahadevan chronology
Tirugu Leni Manishi (1981)	Aggi Ravva (1981)	Prema Mandiram (1981)

Music composed by K. V. Mahadevan.

All lyrics are written by Acharya Aatreya.

No.	Title	Singer(s)	Length
1.	"One Two Three"	S. P. Balasubrahmanyam	4:04
2.	"Kaaseeki Poyaam Raama Hare"	S. P. Balasubrahmanyam, P. Susheela	4:18
3.	"Paaripothundhi"	S. P. Balasubrahmanyam, P. Susheela	4:15
4.	"Goppala Govindhammo"	S. P. Balasubrahmanyam	4:06
5.	"Pandaithe Panikiraadhu"	S. P. Balasubrahmanyam, P. Susheela	4:15
6.	"Letha Pindhelo"	S. P. Balasubrahmanyam, P. Susheela	3:16
7.	"Bobaba Are Sharabha"	S. P. Balasubrahmanyam	4:21
