= Vetagadu =

1979 Telugu film by K. Raghavendra Rao

- Theatrical release poster
- Directed by: K. Raghavendra Rao
- Written by: Jandhyala (story / dialogues)
- Produced by: M. Arjuna Raju; K. Sivarama Raju
- Starring: N. T. Rama Rao; Sridevi
- Cinematography: K. S. Prakash
- Edited by: Kotagiri Venkateswara Rao
- Music by: Chakravarthy
- Production company: Roja Movies
- Release date: 5 July 1979
- Running time: 149 mins
- Country: India
- Language: Telugu

Vetagadu (transl. Hunter) is a 1979 Indian Telugu-language action film directed by K. Raghavendra Rao. It stars N. T. Rama Rao and Sridevi, with music composed by Chakravarthy. The film was remade in Hindi as Nishana (1980). Both films were made under the same banner and by the same director.

== Cast ==
- N. T. Rama Rao as Raja
- Sridevi as Roja
- Rao Gopal Rao as Sivanandam
- Satyanarayana as Hari
- Allu Ramalingaiah as Kanda
- Jaggayya as Ananda Bhupati
- Kanta Rao as Kalyana Gajapati
- Nagesh as Ponnu Swamy
- Chalapathi Rao as Tribal leader
- Chidatala Appa Rao as Godugu
- Pandari Bai as Ayah
- Pushpalata as Gayatri Devi
- Mamata as Dhillu
- Jayamalini in item number

== Production ==
The producers were not convinced with K. Raghavendra Rao's choice of the female lead being Sridevi because she was "very young". After Rao convinced N. T. Rama Rao, Sridevi was cast.

== Soundtrack ==
Vetagadu

Soundtrack album by Chakravarthy
- Released: 1979
- Genre: Feature film soundtrack
- Length: 28:41
- Label: SAREGAMA Music
- Producer: Chakravarthy

Chakravarthy chronology
Driver Ramudu (1979)	Vetagadu (1979)	Burripallem Bullodu (1979)

The music was composed by Chakravarthy. Lyrics were written by Veturi. The song "Aaku Chaatu" became hugely popular and was remixed in Allari Ramudu.

S. no	Song	Singers	Length
1	"Aaku Chaatu Pinde Tadise"	S. P. Balasubrahmanyam, P. Susheela	3:50
2	"Bangaru Baathuguddu"	S. P. Balasubrahmanyam, P. Susheela	3:27
3	"Puttintollu Tharimesaaru"	S. P. Balasubrahmanyam, P. Susheela	3:32
4	"Jaablitho Cheppanaa"	S. P. Balasubrahmanyam, P. Susheela	3:28
5	"Konda Meedha Chandamaama"	S. P. Balasubrahmanyam, P. Susheela	6:31
6	"Ososi Pillakodipetta"	S. P. Balasubrahmanyam, P. Susheela	4:29
7	"Idhi Puvullu Pooyani"	S. Janaki	3:24
