= Mada Venkateswara Rao =

Indian film actor and comedian (1935–2015)

- Born: 4 June 1935
- Died: 24 October 2015 (aged 80); Hyderabad, Telangana, India
- Occupation: Actor
- Years active: 1967–2015

Mada Venkateswara Rao (4 June 1935 – 24 October 2015) was an Indian actor from Andhra Pradesh. He acted in more than 600 Telugu films. He played notable roles in the films Mutyala Muggu, Lambadolla Ramdasu, and Mayadari Malligadu. He was known for his comedy roles.

== Career ==
He worked as an engineer in the state civil department before becoming an actor. He entered theater as a stage artist and also worked as a cine journalist. Later, he made his debut in films with Sudigundalu. He became popular with the eunuch role he played in the 1977 film Chillara Kottu Chittemma, directed by Dasari Narayana Rao. He played similar roles in subsequent films.

He died on 24 October 2015, while undergoing treatment in a private hospital in Hyderabad.

== Filmography ==
- Sudigundalu (1968)
- Andala Ramudu (1973)
- Mayadari Malligadu (1973)
- Meena (1973) as Picheswara Rao
- Mayadari Malligadu (1973) as Schoolmaster
- Peddalu Maarali (1974)
- Galipatalu (1974)
- Tulabharam (1974) as Giri
- Manushullo Devudu (1974)
- Mutyala Muggu (1975)
- Gundavantudu (1975)
- Padi Pantalu (1976) as Kondayya, Guravayya's son
- Aradhana (1976)
- Ramarajyamlo Raktha Paasam (1976) as Sevaksri
- Muthyala Pallaki (1976) as Pati
- Bhale Dongalu (1976)
- Adavi Ramudu (1977)
- Manassakshi (1977)
- Chillara Kottu Chittemma (1977)
- Seetapathi Samsaram (1978) as Janabethu Anjaneyulu
- Lawyer Viswanath (1978)
- Karunamayudu (1978)
- Malle Poovu (1978)
- Lambadolla Ramadasu (1978)
- Manavoori Pandavulu (1978)
- Driver Ramudu (1979)
- Karthika Deepam (1979)
- Sri Madvirata Parvam (1979)
- Kodalu Vastunaru Jagratha (1980) as Dance Teacher
- Jathara (1980) as Kamaraju
- Bhola Shankarudu (1980)
- Thathayya Premaleelalu (1980)
- Ragile Hrudayalu (1980) as Gurunatham, the drunkard
- Gharana Donga (1980) as Krishna's assistant
- Pelli Gola (1980) as Vishnumurthy's manager
- Gadasari Atta Sogasari Kodalu (1981)
- Chattaniki Kallu Levu (1981) as Simhachalam
- Pakkinti Ammayi (1981)
- Oorukichchina Maata (1981) as Daivadheenam
- Prema Nakshatram (1982)
- Korukunna Mogudu (1982)
- Bandhalu Anubandhalu (1982)
- Pratigna (1982) as Ullipayala Mallayya
- Bezawada Bebbuli (1983)
- Gudachari No 1 (1983)
- Maro Mayabazar (1983)
- Ikanaina Marandi (1983)
- Tarzan Sundari (1983) as Ayurvedic Doctor
- Shakthi (1983)
- Sardar (1984)
- Palnati Puli (1984) as Kondandam
- Padmavyuham (1984) as Panthulu
- Merupu Daadi (1984)
- Mantra Dandam (1985)
- Khooni (1985) as Devadasu
- Adavi Donga (1985)
- Pelli Meeku Akshintalu Naaku (1985)
- Maya Mohini (1985)
- Aggiraju (1985)
- Pattabhishekam (1985)
- Ooriki Soggadu (1985) as Abaddham
- Car Diddina Kapuram (1986) as Seth Kishanlal
- Ugra Narasimham (1986)
- Prathidwani (1986)
- Seetharama Kalyanam (1986)
- Ravana Brahma (1986)
- Srimathi Kanuka (1986)
- Karu Diddina Kapuram (1986)
- Naga Devatha (1986)
- Krishna Garadi (1986) as Devadasu
- Kondaveeti Raja (1986)
- Jayam Manade (1986)
- Ide Naa Samadhanam (1986) as Ananthachari
- Adavi Raja (1986) as Kadupula Subba Reddy
- Veera Pratap (1987)
- Rowdy Babai (1987)
- Bharatamlo Arjunudu (1987) as Panganamala Ranganatham
- Samrat (1987) as Avatharam
- Dongodochadu (1987) as 'Natasarpa' Appa Rao
- Kirai Dada (1987) as Chitti
- Punya Dampathulu (1987)
- Chinnari Devatha (1987)
- Muddayi (1987) as Collector's assistant
- Chandamama Raave (1987)
- Sankharavam (1987) as Ponnu Swamy
- Praja Pratinidhi (1988)
- Brahma Putrudu (1988)
- Chuttalabbayi (1988)
- Bharya Bhartala Bagotham (1988)
- Veguchukka Pagatichukka (1988)
- Aanimuthyam (1988)
- Chattamto Chadarangam (1988) as Police Constable
- Raktha Kanneeru (1989) as Dr. Khadar Khan
- Bhale Donga (1989) as Gurbachan Singh
- Gopal Rao Gari Abbayi (1989)
- Sahasame Naa Oopiri (1989)
- Ontari Poratam (1989) as Vishweshwaraiah, Shopping Complex Owner
- Prananiki Pranam (1990) as Inspector
- Kaliyuga Abhimanyudu (1990) as Anji
- Muddula Menalludu (1990)
- Guru Sishyulu (1990)
- Aayudham (1990)
- Amma Rajinama (1991)
- Tharaka Prabhuni Deeksha Mahimalu (1991)
- Subba Rayudi Pelli (1992)
- Pelli Neeku Shobanam Naaku (1992)
- Manavarali Pelli (1993) as Snake Charmer
- Paruvu Prathishta (1993)
- Jeevithame Oka Cinema (1993)
- Allari Premikudu (1994)
- Gharana Bullodu (1995)
- Bhale Bullodu (1995)
- Bethala Mantrikudu (1997)
- Ganesh (1998)
- Love Story 1999 (1998)
- Lagna Patrika (2002)
- Pagale Vennela (2007)
