= Chanakya Chandragupta =

- Theatrical release poster
- Directed by: N. T. Rama Rao
- Written by: Pingali (dialogues)
- Screenplay by: N. T. Rama Rao
- Story by: N. T. Rama Rao
- Produced by: N. T. Rama Rao
- Starring: Akkineni Nageswara Rao; N. T. Rama Rao; Sivaji Ganesan; Jayaprada; Manjula
- Cinematography: Kannappa
- Edited by: G. D. Joshi
- Music by: Pendyala
- Production company: Ramakrishna Cine Studios
- Release date: 25 August 1977
- Running time: 178 minutes
- Country: India
- Language: Telugu

Chanakya Chandragupta is a 1977 Indian Telugu-language historical drama film directed and produced by N. T. Rama Rao under the banner of Ramakrishna Cine Studios. The film stars Akkineni Nageswara Rao, Rama Rao, Sivaji Ganesan, Jayaprada, Manjula and Kaikala Satyanarayana, with music composed by Pendyala Nageswara Rao.

The story focuses on the life of Chandragupta Maurya, the founder of the Maurya Empire, and his mentor, Chanakya. Chanakya Chandragupta is significant for featuring three legendary figures of Indian cinema—Rama Rao, Nageswara Rao and Sivaji Ganesan.

== Plot ==
Set in the 4th century BCE, the film narrates the historical tale of Chandragupta Maurya, the founder of the Maurya Empire, and his mentor, Chanakya. The story begins with the Greek invader Alexander encroaching upon Indian territories, with Magadha being his ultimate target for conquest. In response to this impending threat, Chanakya, a fearless scholar and strategist, sets out to stop the invasion. He recognizes the potential in Chandragupta, a talented fighter and the son of Mura, a discarded wife of the Nanda ruler Mahapadma Nanda.

Unbeknownst to this, Chandragupta arrives in Pataliputra determined to confront the tyrannical Nanda princes who oppress the people. In Pataliputra, he begins to rally support against the nine arrogant Nanda princes and faces the cunning Chief Minister Rakshasa, who quickly recognizes Chandragupta’s true potential. Aware of Chandragupta's identity, Rakshasa seeks to apprehend him, fearing his claim to the throne.

As tensions rise, Mura arrives at Pataliputra, where she confesses to Chandragupta his royal heritage, explaining her past with Mahapadma Nanda. Despite his initial outrage, Chandragupta ultimately accepts Mura's revelations. During this period, he develops feelings for Aasa, Rakshasa's daughter, who, unaware of their familial ties, aids him in escaping from captivity.

Simultaneously, Chanakya infiltrates the royal palace, attempting to awaken the Nandas to the dangers they face. However, his efforts result in severe mistreatment at the hands of the Nandas. Vowing to annihilate the Nanda dynasty, Chanakya becomes a target for Rakshasa, who attempts to assassinate him. Chandragupta intervenes, securing Chanakya’s safety and solidifying their alliance. Chanakya recognizes Chandragupta as the rightful heir and the only candidate capable of becoming emperor.

Following their alliance, Chanakya employs various strategies to fortify Chandragupta's position. He arranges for Chandragupta to form a friendship with the tribal king Parvataka, promising to make his daughter, Chhaya, the future empress. Meanwhile, Rakshasa employs deceitful tactics to undermine their rebellion, including plotting Chandragupta's demise and creating a secret passage between the fortress and Chanakya's hideout. Furthermore, he manipulates Aasa, exploiting her affection for Chandragupta and turning her into a dangerous adversary.

As the narrative progresses, Alexander arrives on the Indian subcontinent, escalating the conflict. Aasa's love for Chandragupta intensifies, prompting Chanakya to remind him of his purpose through his mother, Mura. Motivated by this, Chandragupta confronts and defeats Alexander in a climactic duel, compelling the invader to retreat and acknowledge the bond between mentor and disciple.

Following their victory, Chanakya uncovers Rakshasa's plot regarding the secret tunnel. Employing strategic maneuvers, Chandragupta launches a counter-offensive, ultimately conquering Magadha. In a pivotal moment, Chanakya executes the Nanda rulers, allowing Chandragupta to ascend the throne and establish the Maurya Empire in honour of his mother, Mura. However, Mahapadma Nanda, enraged by his family's downfall, attempts to assassinate Chandragupta after Mura's death, ultimately taking his own life in despair.

As Chandragupta prepares to celebrate his victory and union with Aasa, Chanakya reveals her true identity and heritage, leading Aasa to make a self-sacrifice for the greater good. In the film's resolution, Chanakya secures Rakshasa's loyalty and appoints him as Chandragupta's Chief Minister, ensuring that his wisdom will guide the new empire. The film concludes on a hopeful note, with Chanakya crowning Chandragupta, signifying the dawn of a new era under the Maurya Empire.

== Cast ==
- N. T. Rama Rao as Chandragupta Maurya
- Akkineni Nageswara Rao as Chanakya
- Sivaji Ganesan as Alexander
- Manjula as Chhaya
- Jayaprada as Aasa
- Kaikala Satyanarayana as Rakshasa Mantri
- S. Varalakshmi as Muradevi
- Prabhakar Reddy as Parvathakudu
- Rajanala as Mahapadma Nanda
- Mukkamala as Ambhi
- Raja Babu as Nandulu
- Padmanabham as Nandulu
- Rao Gopal Rao as Nandulu
- K. K. Sarma as Nandulu
- Chalapathi Rao as Kaapalika
- Jayamalini as item number
- Halam as item number
- Sarathi as Nandulu
- Potti Prasad as Nandulu
- Chitti Babu as Nandulu

== Production ==
N. T. Rama Rao commissioned a bound script for Chanakya Chandragupta from Pingali, and for Daana Veera Soora Karna from Kondaveeti Venkatakavi. Initially, Rama Rao approached Akkineni Nageswara Rao to portray Lord Krishna in Daana Veera Soora Karna. However, Nageswara Rao declined the offer, prompting Rama Rao to assume the role himself. Nageswara Rao then expressed interest in playing Chanakya in Chanakya Chandragupta. Originally, Rama Rao planned to play Chanakya and have his son, Balakrishna, as Chandragupta, but after Nageswara Rao's suggestion, Rama Rao took the role of Chandragupta, and Nageswara Rao portrayed Chanakya. This film marked the collaboration of Rama Rao and Nageswara Rao after nearly 14 years, following the release of Sri Krishnarjuna Yuddham (1963).

Filming for Chanakya Chandragupta commenced in 1976 but was halted due to the death of Rama Rao's father. Subsequently, Rama Rao opted to begin production on Daana Veera Soora Karna, a project he had long planned, which ultimately became a major success. Notably, the back cover of the song book for Daana Veera Soora Karna featured a still of both Rama Rao and Nageswara Rao, announcing their next collaboration, Chanakya Chandragupta. Nageswara Rao did not charge a fee for his role in Chanakya Chandragupta and later invited N. T. Rama Rao to act under his Annapurna Studios banner, to which Rama Rao agreed. This collaboration led to Rama Krishnulu (1978), produced by Nageswara Rao in association with Jagapathi Art Pictures, where both actors appeared together. The film achieved significant success.

In the film's credits, Akkineni Nageswara Rao is listed first, followed by Sivaji Ganesan, who plays Alexander. The title Chanakya Chandragupta appears next, along with credits for story, screenplay, and direction attributed to Rama Rao. Although Rama Rao is credited as the producer at the end of the film, his name does not appear in the actor's credits.

== Historical accuracy ==
The historical accuracy of Chanakya Chandragupta had been a topic of discussion after its release. One of the key debates surrounding the film is whether Chandragupta Maurya and Alexander ever met. Some historians assert that the two figures never encountered each other, with evidence suggesting that it was King Porus who confronted Alexander during his Indian campaign. However, others argue that Chandragupta had already established the Maurya Empire before Alexander's arrival in the region.

There are also claims that Chandragupta secretly worked within Alexander's army, gaining insights into their strategies and eventually earning Alexander's respect. According to Greek historian Plutarch, Chandragupta did meet Alexander during his campaign in India, and this is the version of events depicted in the film. N. T. Rama Rao used this account as the basis for the narrative of Chanakya Chandragupta. The film's release sparked interest and debate over the historical interactions between Chandragupta and Alexander.

== Music ==
The film's music was composed by Pendyala, with lyrics by C. Narayana Reddy. Notable songs include "Chirunavvula Tolakari lo" and "Evaro Aa Chandrudevaro."

Track listing
| No. | Title | Singer(s) | Length |
|---|---|---|---|
| 1. | "Chirunavvula Tholakarilo" | S. P. Balasubrahmanyam, P. Susheela | 3:38 |
| 2. | "Evaro Aa Chandrudevaro" | P. Susheela | 3:48 |
| 3. | "Idhe Tholireyi" | P. Susheela | 3:54 |
| 4. | "Okata Renda Thommidi" | S. P. Balasubrahmanyam, S. Janaki | 4:18 |
| 5. | "Sikandar Toone" | Vani Jayaram | 5:45 |
| 6. | "Siri Siri Chinnoda" | Vani Jayaram | 3:23 |
| Total length: | | | 24:46 |

== Reception ==
=== Critical response ===
Veera of Visalaandhra reviewed the film positively, commending the performances of the cast. The review also highlighted N. T. Rama Rao's production and direction, along with the dialogues, music, and lyrics, as notable aspects of the film.

=== Box office ===
The film became a success, particularly in cities like Vijayawada, where it ran for 100 days. However, its theatrical run was affected by the blockbuster success of another Rama Rao film, Adavi Ramudu (1977) which released a few months earlier.
