= Ummadi Kutumbam =

- Theatrical release poster
- Directed by: D. Yoganand
- Written by: Samudrala Jr (dialogues)
- Screenplay by: N. T. Rama Rao
- Story by: N. T. Rama Rao
- Produced by: N. Trivikrama Rao
- Starring: N. T. Rama Rao; Savitri; Krishna Kumari
- Cinematography: Ravikant Nagaich
- Edited by: G. D. Joshi
- Music by: T. V. Raju
- Production companies: NAT & Ramakrishna Cine Studios
- Release date: 20 April 1967
- Running time: 160 minutes
- Country: India
- Language: Telugu

Ummadi Kutumbam (transl. Joint Family) is a 1967 Indian Telugu-language comedy drama film, produced by N. Trivikrama Rao under the NAT & Ramakrishna Cine Studios banner and directed by D. Yoganand. It stars N. T. Rama Rao, Savitri and Krishna Kumari, with music composed by T. V. Raju.

== Cast ==
- N. T. Rama Rao as Ramu
- Savitri as Rama
- Krishna Kumari as Sarada
- Relangi as Nagaiah
- Nagabhushanam as Zamindar Bhavani Prasad
- Satyanarayana as Chandram
- Prabhakar Reddy as Dr. Mukunda Rao
- Allu Ramalingaiah as Pasupathi
- Raja Babu as Tippayya
- Mukkamala as Subbaiah
- Balakrishna
- Nagaraju
- Suryakantam as Gowri
- S. Varalakshmi as Kantham
- Vanisri as Venki
- Hemalatha
- Chaya Devi
- L. Vijayalakshmi as Mohini
- Potti Prasad

== Soundtrack ==
Ummadi Kutumbam

Film score by T. V. Raju
- Released: 1967
- Genre: Soundtrack
- Length: 25:31
- Producer: T. V. Raju

Music composed by T. V. Raju.

S. No.	Song title	Lyrics	Singers	length
1	"Tassadiyya Tassadiyya"	Kosaraju	Ghantasala	2:12
2	"Bhale Mojuga Tayaraina"	C. Narayana Reddy	Ghantasala, P. Susheela	3:21
3	"Cheppalani Undi"	C. Narayana Reddy	Ghantasala, P. Susheela	3:11
4	"Hello Hello My Dear"	C. Narayana Reddy	Ghantasala, L. R. Eswari	3:38
5	"Chethiki Chikave Pitta"	C. Narayana Reddy	Ghantasala	3:48
6	"Jigi Jigi Jigelumannadi"	C. Narayana Reddy	L. R. Eswari	3:18
7	"Sadivinodikanna Oranna"	Kosaraju	Madhavapeddi Satyam, L. R. Eswari	2:58
8	"Kutumbam Ummadi Kutumbam"	C. Narayana Reddy	Ghantasala, P. Leela	3:05

== Awards ==
The film was selected by the Film Federation of India as one of its entries to the 1968 Moscow Film Festival.

== Box office ==
- The film celebrated a Silver Jubilee and ran for 197 days at Durga Kala Mandir, Vijayawada.
