= Driver Ramudu =

- Theatrical poster
- Directed by: K. Raghavendra Rao
- Written by: Jandhyala(dialogues)
- Screenplay by: K. Raghavendra Rao
- Story by: Tarakarama Films Unit
- Produced by: Nandamuri Harikrishna
- Starring: N. T. Rama Rao; Jayasudha
- Cinematography: K. S. Prakash
- Edited by: Babu Rao
- Music by: Chakravarthy
- Production company: Ramakrishna Cine Studios
- Release date: 2 February 1979
- Running time: 145 minutes
- Country: India
- Language: Telugu
- Box office: ₹2.5 crores

Driver Ramudu is a 1979 Indian Telugu-language action drama film directed by K. Raghavendra Rao and produced by Nandamuri Harikrishna under the Ramakrishna Cine Studios banner. It stars N. T. Rama Rao and Jayasudha, with music by Chakravarthy. The film was released in 35 centres across Andhra Pradesh on 2 February 1979. It was remade in Tamil as Lorry Driver Rajakannu (1981) and in Hindi as Tarkeeb (1984).

== Plot ==
Ramu is a gallant lorry driver who impedes societal violations. Once he collars his colleague Khan, who conducts contraband, he establishes an association for the welfare of drivers, getting knowledge that they are going astray as destitute by the few felonious. Ramu resides with his blind sibling Meena, whom he has reared with much love. A generous Inspector Raja Reddy endears Meena and they get engaged. Meanwhile, Vasu lorry:111 has forsaken his wife Kantham by snaring off a call girl, Kalavati, which made her insane. Ramu rectifies him and pleads to pardon his wife, and they turn into besties. Parallelly, Ramu always squabbles with a plucky motel owner, Chukkamma, and they crush. Besides, Jagarlamudi Jaganadham / Jackal is a hazardous gangster presiding in gold and smuggling in pumpkins associated with his son Kamal. They conclude a contract with Ramu to transport via their association, unbeknownst to hoodwink, he signs. At a point, Khan gazes at it and rushes to notify Ramu, who blackguards slaughter. Ramu is incriminated and sentenced for the whole. Today, he takes the dare and absconds from the prison. At last, Ramu ceases baddies with the aid of Vasu in various disguises. Finally, the movie ends on a happy note with the marriage of Ramu & Chukkamma.

== Cast ==
- N. T. Rama Rao as Ramu
- Jayasudha as Chukkamma
- Rao Gopal Rao
- Satyanarayana as Vasu
- Allu Ramalingaiah
- Mohan Babu as Kamal Babu
- Sridhar as Inspector Raja Reddy
- Mada
- Chalapathi Rao
- Roja Ramani as Meena
- Kanchana as Kantam
- Chaya Devi
- Jayamalini as Kalavati
- Halam
- Mamatha

== Production ==
Portions of the film were shot in Araku, which gained popularity as a filming location following the film's release.

== Music ==
Driver Ramudu

Soundtrack album by Chakravarthy
- Released: 1979
- Genre: Feature film soundtrack
- Length: 21:46
- Label: SAREGAMA Audio
- Producer: Chakravarthy

Chakravarthy chronology
Burripalem Bullodu (1979)	Driver Ramudu (1979)	Vetagaadu (1979)

Music composed by Chakravarthy. Music released on SAREGAMA Audio Company. The song "Vangamaaku" was remixed in the 2004 film Xtra and "Mamila Thopukada" was remixed in the 2011 film Veera.

S. No	Song title	Lyrics	Singers	length
1	"Gugu Gugu Gudisundi"	Acharya Aatreya	S. P. Balasubrahmanyam, P. Susheela	3:32
2	"Vangamaaku"	Veturi	S. P. Balasubrahmanyam, P. Susheela	4:08
3	"Emani Varninchanu"	Acharya Aatreya	S. P. Balasubrahmanyam, P. Susheela	4:08
4	"Mamilla Thopukaada"	Veturi	S. P. Balasubrahmanyam, P. Susheela	3:15
5	"Donga Donga Dorikaadu"	Veturi	S. P. Balasubrahmanyam, P. Susheela	3:22
6	"Endharo Mudhu Gummalu"	Aarudhra	S. P. Balasubrahmanyam, P. Susheela	3:21

== Reception ==
The film celebrated a 100-day run at 14 centres and a silver jubilee (25 weeks) at 2 centres.
