= Akbar Salim Anarkali =

1978 film

- Theatrical release poster
- Directed by: N. T. Rama Rao
- Written by: C. Narayana Reddy(dialogues)
- Screenplay by: N. T. Rama Rao
- Story by: N. T. Rama Rao
- Produced by: N. T. Rama Rao
- Starring: N. T. Rama Rao; Nandamuri Balakrishna; Deepa
- Cinematography: Kannappa
- Edited by: G. D. Joshi
- Music by: C. Ramchandra
- Production company: Ramakrishna Studios
- Release date: 15 March 1978
- Running time: 134 minutes
- Country: India
- Language: Telugu

Akbar Salim Anarkali is a 1978 Indian Telugu-language historical romance film produced and directed by N. T. Rama Rao under his Ramakrishna Cine Studios banner. The film stars Rama Rao, Nandamuri Balakrishna and Deepa, with music composed by C. Ramchandra. It is based on the legend of the romance between the Mughal prince Salim (later known as Jahangir) and the court dancer Anarkali, which is disapproved of by the emperor Akbar. The film was unsuccessful.

== Plot ==
The Mughal emperor Akbar, who does not have a male heir, undertakes a pilgrimage to a shrine to pray that his wife Jodha give birth to a son. Later, Tansen the singer in his court, brings the emperor news of his son's birth. Overjoyed at his prayers being answered Akbar gives Tansen his ring and promises to grant him anything he desires. Here, Salim grows as a spoiled brat, flippant and self-indulgent. Akbar sends him off to war, to teach him courage and discipline. After 14 years, Salim returns as a distinguished soldier and falls in love with court-dancer Nadira, whom the emperor bestows on her the title Anarkali (pomegranate blossom). Gulnar, a dancer of a higher rank, is envious as she too aspires the prince's love but fails. She exposes their forbidden relationship with the Emperor. Salim pleads with his father for acceptance of their espousal, but he refuses and imprisons Anarkali.

Salim rebels and amasses an army to confront Akbar to rescue Anarkali. He is defeated and sentenced to death by his father but is told that the sentence will be revoked if Anarkali, now in hiding, is handed over to die in his place. Anarkali gives herself up to save the prince's life and is condemned to death by being entombed alive. Before her sentence is carried out, she begs to have a few hours with Salim as his make-believe wife. Her request is granted, as she has agreed to drug Salim so that he cannot interfere with her entombment. As Anarkali is being walled up, Akbar is reminded that he still owes Tansen a favour, as it was he who brought him news of Salim's birth. He pleads for Anarkali's life. Akbar has a change of opinion, but although he wants to release Anarkali he cannot, because of his duty to his country. He, therefore, arranges for her secret escape into exile with Tansen but demands that the pair are to live in obscurity and that Salim is never to know that Anarkali is still alive.

== Cast ==
- N. T. Rama Rao as Akbar
- Jamuna as Jodha
- Nandamuri Balakrishna as Salim
- Deepa as Anarkali
- Gummadi as Tansen
- Sreedhar
- Madhavi as Gulnar
- P. J. Sarma
- Chalapathi Rao

== Soundtrack ==
Music was composed by C. Ramchandra. Lyrics was written by C. Narayana Reddy.

Track listing
No.	Title	Singer(s)	Length
1.	"Sipaayee O Sipaayee"	Mohammad Rafi, P. Susheela	4:46
2.	"Kalusukunnaa Gubulaaye"	Mohammad Rafi, P. Susheela	4:39
3.	"Madhana Mohanude"	P. Susheela, Mustafa Khan	5:10
4.	"Premisthe Thappantaaraa"	P. Susheela	5:00
5.	"Reyi Aagiponi"	Mohammad Rafi, P. Susheela	5:56
6.	"Thaane Maeli Musugu"	Mohammad Rafi, P. Susheela	5:02
7.	"Thaaralenthagaa"	Mohammad Rafi	4:41
8.	"Vela Erigina"	P. Susheela, Vani Jairam	8:51
9.	"Enduku Enduku"	S P Balasubramanyam	4:31
Total length:			44:04
