= Srimadvirata Parvam =

Srimad Virata Parvam
- Theatrical release poster
- Directed by: N. T. Rama Rao
- Written by: Kondaveeti Venkatakavi (dialogues); N. T. Rama Rao (story / screenplay)
- Based on: Virata Parva of Mahabharata
- Produced by: N. T. Rama Rao
- Starring: N. T. Rama Rao; Vanisri; Nandamuri Balakrishna
- Cinematography: M. A. Rehman
- Edited by: K. Babu Rao; N. S. Prasad
- Music by: Susarla Dakshina Murthy
- Production company: Ramakrishna Cine Studios
- Release date: 28 May 1979
- Running time: 155 minutes
- Country: India
- Language: Telugu

Srimad Virata Parvam is a 1979 Telugu-language Hindu mythological film, produced and directed by N. T. Rama Rao under his Ramakrishna Cine Studios banner. It stars N. T. Rama Rao, Vanisri, Nandamuri Balakrishna and the music is composed by Susarla Dakshina Murthy. The film is based on Virata Parva from epic Mahabharata in which NTR has performed 5 pivotal roles after the blockbuster success of Daana Veera Soora Karna (1977), in which he emoted 3 different roles. It is a color remake of the 1966 movie Nartanasala both starring N.T.Rama Rao as Arjuna.

== Cast ==
- N. T. Rama Rao as Krishna, Duryodhana, Brihannala, Arjuna, & Kichaka (Five roles)
- Vanisri as Draupadi
- Nandamuri Balakrishna as Abhimanyu
- Satyanarayana as Bhima & Ghatotkacha (Dual role)
- Prabhakar Reddy as Dharma Raju
- Mukkamala as Virata
- Mikkilineni as Bhishma
- Dhulipala as Shakuni
- Rajanala as Drona
- Mada as Uttara Kumara
- Bhavani as Uttara
- Chhaya Devi as Hidimbi
- Prabha as Satyabhama
- Pushpalatha as Sudeshna
- Vijayalalitha as Urvashi

== Soundtrack ==
Sri Madvirata Parvam

Film score by Susarla Dakshinamurthi
- Released: 1979
- Genre: Soundtrack
- Length: 27:24
- Label: EMI Columbia Audio
- Producer: Susarla Dakshinamurthi

Music composed by Susarla Dakshinamurthi. Music released on EMI Columbia Audio Company.

S. No	Song title	Lyrics	Singers	length
1	"Ramani Pilichindira"	Veturi	Vani Jayaram	4:37
2	"Jeevithame Krishna Sangeetamu"	Veturi	M. Balamuralikrishna	3:43
3	"Aadave Hamsagamana"	Veturi	M. Balamuralikrishna	5:22
4	"Nirajanam Jayanirajanam"	C. Narayana Reddy	S. Janaki	2:22
5	"Muddisthe Muripintha"	C. Narayana Reddy	Madhavapeddi Ramesh, S. Janaki	3:25
6	"Neeku Nene Sari"	C. Narayana Reddy	S. P. Balasubrahmanyam, Madhavapeddi Ramesh, S. Janaki	3:30
7	"Manasayena Mathipoyena"	C. Narayana Reddy	S. P. Balasubrahmanyam, P. Susheela	4:25

== Other ==
- VCDs and DVDs on – Universal Videos, SHALIMAR Video Company, Hyderabad
