= Anuraga Devatha =

- Theatrical release poster
- Directed by: T. Rama Rao
- Written by: Paruchuri Brothers(dialogues)
- Screenplay by: T. Rama Rao
- Based on: Aasha by Ram Kelkar
- Produced by: Nandamuri Harikrishna
- Starring: N. T. Rama Rao; Sridevi; Jayasudha
- Cinematography: Nandamuri Mohana Krishna
- Edited by: Ravi
- Music by: Chakravarthy
- Production company: Ramakrishna Cine Studios
- Release date: 9 January 1982
- Running time: 147 minutes
- Country: India
- Language: Telugu

Anuraga Devatha (Benevolent Goddess) is a 1982 Indian Telugu-language drama film produced by Nandamuri Harikrishna for Ramakrishna Cine Studios, and directed by T. Rama Rao. The film stars N. T. Rama Rao, Sridevi and Jayasudha, with music composed by Chakravarthy. It is a remake of the Hindi film Aasha (1980).

== Plot ==
Ramu is a truck driver giving a lift to famous singer Rupa Devi, who befriends and calls him a Nestham friend. Rupa recognises his inherent musical talent as she falls for him. She becomes aware of Ramu's love for Tulasi, whom he later marries. Shortly thereafter, he meets with an accident and is declared dead. Ramu's grieving mother charges pregnant Tulasi when she attempts suicide. However, a young, charming Prakash safeguards Tulasi, but she loses her sight. Prakash lives in a colony where diverse communities reside, where Thulasi gives birth to a baby girl, Rama Tulasi. Prakash shelters them and treats Thulasi as his sibling. Surprisingly, Ramu is identified as alive and is conscious of Thulasi's death. He declines and becomes a wanderer. Rupa re-enters his life during that plight, solaces himself with her acquaintance, and endears her. The duo conducts music programs and summits the peaks. Time passes, and Rama Tulasi grows ten years; unbeknownst, Ramu and Rupa acquaint and enchant her. Rupa nears Thulasi via Rama Tulasi, and she recoups her vision. Next, Rupa invites Thulasi to her wedding with Ramu. At that point, Thulasi is startled to view Ramu as the bridegroom. So, she silently attempts to quit out of gratitude. Meanwhile, Prakash divulges the actuality to Ramu. At last, Rupa calls off the espousal and allows Ramu to go. Finally, the movie ends on a happy note, with Ramu reuniting with his wife and daughter, and Rupa returns on stage permanently.

== Cast ==
- N. T. Rama Rao as Ramu
- Sridevi as Rupa Devi
- Jayasudha as Tulasi
- Nandamuri Balakrishna as Prakash
- Allu Ramalingaiyah as Papa Rao
- Gummadi as Priest
- Nutan Prasad as Gopal
- Mikkilineni as Sivaiah
- Mukkamala as Doctor
- Chitti Babu as Violinist
- Chidatala Appa Rao as Musician
- Annapurna as Ramu's mother
- Kavitha as Dhanalakshmi
- Rushyendramani as Peddamma
- Dubbing Janaki as Doctor
- Anuradha Sriram as Ramatulasi

== Soundtrack ==
Music was composed by Chakravarthy. Lyrics were written by Veturi.

S.No	Song title	Singers	Length
1	"Andala Hrudayama"	S. P. Balasubrahmanyam	3:52
2	"Choosuko Padilanga"	P. Susheela	4:20
3	"Nee Aata Naa Paata"	S. P. Balasubrahmanyam	4:58
4	"Aadave Gopika"	S. P. Balasubrahmanyam, P. Susheela	6:05
5	"Muggurammala"	S. P. Balasubrahmanyam, P. Susheela	3:18
6	"Muggurammala Ganna"	P. Susheela	4:14
