= Srimadvirat Veerabrahmendra Swami Charitra =

Sri Madvirat Veerabrahmendra Swami Charitra
- Theatrical release poster
- Directed by: N. T. Rama Rao
- Written by: Kondaveeti Venkata Kavi (dialogues)
- Screenplay by: N. T. Rama Rao
- Based on: life of Pothuluri Veerabrahmam
- Produced by: N. T. Rama Rao
- Starring: N. T. Rama Rao; Nandamuri Balakrishna; Rati Agnihotri
- Cinematography: Nandamuri Mohana Krishna
- Edited by: Ravi
- Music by: Susarla Dakshinamurthi
- Production company: Ramakrishna Cine Studios
- Release date: 29 November 1984
- Running time: 173 minutes
- Country: India
- Language: Telugu
- Box office: ₹6.6 crore

Sri Madvirat Veerabrahmendra Swami Charitra is a 1984 Indian Telugu-language biographical film, based on life of Pothuluri Veerabrahmam, produced and directed by N. T. Rama Rao under his Ramakrishna Cine Studios banner. N. T. Rama Rao portrayed the characters of Gautama Buddha, Vemana, Ramanuja, Adi Shankara along with the title role. It stars Nandamuri Balakrishna, Rati Agnihotri and Kanchana with music composed by Susarla Dakshinamurthi. Actually, shooting of the film was completed by 1981, but the release got delayed due to objection from the censor board asking to delete a few scenes from the movie, to which NTR did not agree and immediately took the matter to court and finally got it released in November 1984.

== Cast ==
- N. T. Rama Rao as Sri Potuluri Veerabrahmendra Swamy, Gautama Buddha, Aadi Shankaracharya, Ramanujacharya & Yogi Vemana (Five roles)
- Nandamuri Balakrishna as Sayyad/ Siddayya
- Satyanarayana as Kakkadu
- Allu Ramalingaiah as Karanam
- Mikkilineni as Siva Kotaiah
- Mukkamala as Siddayya's father-in-law
- Rallapalli as Bhooshaiah
- P. J. Sarma as Munsab
- Chalapathi Rao as Sultan
- Chitti Babu
- Madan Mohan
- Rati Agnihotri as Raziya
- Rushyendramani as Veerapapamanba
- Kanchana as Govindamma
- Devika as Gollalu
- Prabha as Vishwada
- Annapurna as Siddayya's mother
- Kavita as Polamma
- Dubbing Janaki as Yekukalasani
- Rajyalakshmi
- Krishnaveni as Veeranarayanamma
- Master Harish as Child Veerabrahmendra Swamy

== Soundtrack ==
Sri Madvirat Veerabrahmendra Swami Charitra

Film score by Susarla Dakshinamurthi
- Released: 1984
- Genre: Soundtrack
- Length: 81:57
- Label: Saregama Audio
- Producer: Susarla Dakshinamurthi

Music composed by Susarla Dakshinamurthi. Lyrics written by C. Narayana Reddy, Kosaraju and Kondaveeti Venkatakavi. Music released on Saregama Audio Company.

S. No.	Song title	Singers	length
1	Aasathoma Sadhgamaya	N. T. Rama Rao	0:30
2	Vemana Sukthulu	V. Ramakrishna	3:17
3	Neevuyevaro	P. Leela	4:11
4	Bhuloka Kalpataruvu	V. Ramakrishna	0:30
5	Shiva Govinda Govinda	V. Ramakrishna	4:40
6	Shiva Govinda Govinda-II	V. Ramakrishna	6:00
7	Nandamaya Guruda Nandamaya	V. Ramakrishna	4:11
8	Vinara Vinara O Naruda	V. Ramakrishna	4:08
9	Kulabheda Matabheda	V. Ramakrishna	1:42
10	Yemandi Pandithulara	V. Ramakrishna	5:08
11	Chilakamma Palakave	V. Ramakrishna	6:07
12	Pavithram (Slokam)	V. Ramakrishna	0:35
13	Yoganandhakari (Slokam)	V. Ramakrishna	0:32
14	Srungara Rasaraja	Vani Jayaram	4:25
15	Mama Kuthura	S. P. Balasubrahmanyam, P. Susheela	4:21
16	Chenguna Dhookali	S. P. Balasubrahmanyam, P. Susheela	3:31
17	Matham Neethira	S. P. Balasubrahmanyam	5:18
18	Mayadhaari Marala Bandira	V. Ramakrishna	7:06
19	Slokam	V. Ramakrishna	1:00
20	Panchamudani Ninu	V. Ramakrishna	4:38
21	Cheppaledhantanaka	V. Ramakrishna	5:45
22	Narudaa Naa Maata	V. Ramakrishna	3:50
23	Swasthivachanam (Slokam)	V. Ramakrishna	0:32

== Box office ==
This movie was an Industry hit and was the first Telugu film to gross over ₹1 crore in its first week. It grossed ₹6.6 crore in its full run and ran for 300 days in Hyderabad.
