= Chanda Sasanudu =

- Theatrical release poster
- Directed by: N. T. Rama Rao
- Screenplay by: N. T. Rama Rao
- Story by: Paruchuri brothers
- Produced by: N. T. Rama Rao
- Starring: N. T. Rama Rao; Radha
- Cinematography: Nandamuri Mohana Krishna
- Edited by: M.S.N. Murthy
- Music by: Chakravarthy
- Production company: Ramakrishna Cine Studios
- Distributed by: Ramakrishna Cine Studios
- Release date: 28 May 1983
- Running time: 151 minutes
- Country: India
- Language: Telugu

Chanda Sasanudu (transl. Dictator) is a 1983 Indian Telugu-language action film, produced and directed by N. T. Rama Rao on his Ramakrishna Cine Studios banner. It is a remake of Bengali film Rajbansha (1977). Starring Rama Rao and Radha, with music composed by Chakravarthy, this was Rao's last film before he became Chief Minister of Andhra Pradesh. The film was a hit.

== Plot ==
The film is a battle between feudalism and communism. Harichandra Prasad is a dictator of a terrain Rangapuram adored as a deity. Satyam, a collectivist, antagonizes over whether strengthening the community is higher than godliness. Harichandra Prasad attested that his righteousness goes beyond that. His sister Bhuvaneswari Devi is endeared to Satyam's idealism and connects with him where Harichandra Prasad cut the cords. Venkataiah and Appa Rao, evil followers of Satyam, mingled with Harichandra Prasad's acolyte Karanam, who stole ornaments of God and incriminated Satyam. Harichandra Prasad placed sanctions on him. In that skirmish, Bhuvaneswari gainsays her brother and frees her husband. The trio assassinates Satyam on behalf of Prasad when a rivalry arises between the siblings. Bhuvaneswari affirms raising her son Raja according to her husband's scruples. She places him secretly at her friend Rajyalakshmi's, staying hidden.

Years roll by, and Raja, a youth leader, counteracts the offenses of the trio as they masquerade as respectable. Raja falls for charming Rani, and destiny makes her his maternal uncle's daughter. Hearing it, Rajyalakshmi collapses and returns him to his mother, stating that her word is useless to him. Raja goes to Rangapuram, where Bhuvaneshwari wakes him by showing him the vulnerable sections of disadvantaged agriculturalists and laborers and tells him to emancipate them. He rebels against Harichandra Prasad, who is startled when he notices a resemblance and realizes that Raja is his nephew. From there, he turns a tough nut and scolds Rani for denouncing the country. Hence, Harichandra Prasad makes a charge and tortures Raja. However, he counterattacks him and takes Rani into his custody as an axe to this authority. At this point, Harishchandra Prasad wants to clear his name by unveiling the true culprits. He ends the baddies by accomplishing his sister's pledge, who becomes gravely wounded. The movie ends with Harichandra Prasad dying, followed by Bhuvaneswari, showing their bondage as immortal.

== Cast ==
- N. T. Rama Rao as Harischandra Prasad and Raja
- Sharada as Bhuvaneswari Devi
- Radha as Rani
- Rao Gopal Rao as Venkatesh / Venkataiah
- Satyanarayana as Appa Rao / Appigadu
- Jaggayya as Satyam
- Rallapalli as Karanam
- Chalapathi Rao as Dasu
- Narra Venkateswara Rao as CBI Official
- K.K.Sharma as Police Inspector
- Annapurna as Rajyalakshmi
- Kavitha as Jayasri
- Jayamalini as Parijatham

== Soundtrack ==
Music composed by Chakravarthy. Lyrics were written by C. Narayana Reddy.

Song title	Singers	length
"Naina Nandakumara"	S. P. Balasubrahmanyam, P. Susheela	3:57
"Suku Suku Sukumari"	S. P. Balasubrahmanyam, P. Susheela	4:12
"Chinnari Seethamma"	S. P. Balasubrahmanyam	3:32
"Entha Takkari"	P. Susheela	3:43
"Vaada Vaada"	P. Susheela	4:00
"Desamante Matti Kaadhoy"	S. P. Balasubrahmanyam	3:41
"Anna Chellella"	S. P. Balasubrahmanyam	2:46
"Chinnari Seethamma"	S. P. Balasubrahmanyam, P. Susheela	1:04
"Janam Thiragabaduthondhi"	S. P. Balasubrahmanyam	3:17

== Reception ==
Amarnath K Menon wrote for India Today, "The film, although it is a sloppy patchwork quilt of stunts and sentiment, will still pull in NTR fans, trained as they are, to his cosmetic realism, stereotypes and cliches."
