= Sri Tirupati Venkateswara Kalyanam =

- Theatrical release poster
- Directed by: N. T. Rama Rao
- Written by: D. V. Narasa Raju(dialogues)
- Screenplay by: N. T. Rama Rao
- Based on: Avatar of Lord Venkateswara
- Produced by: N. T. Rama Rao
- Starring: N. T. Rama Rao; Jayasudha; Jayaprada; Nandamuri Balakrishna
- Cinematography: M. A. Rehman
- Edited by: G. D. Joshi; N. S. Prasad
- Music by: Pendyala Nageswara Rao
- Production company: Ramakrishna Cine Studios
- Release date: 28 September 1979
- Running time: 147 minutes
- Country: India
- Language: Telugu

Sri Tirupati Venkateswara Kalyanam is a 1979 Indian Telugu-language Hindu mythological film, based on Lord Venkateswara Avatar at Tirumala, produced and directed by N. T. Rama Rao under his Ramakrishna Cine Studios banner. It stars N. T. Rama Rao, Jaya Prada, Jayasudha, Nandamuri Balakrishna and its music is composed by Pendyala Nageswara Rao.

== Cast ==
- N. T. Rama Rao as Lord Venkateswara
- Jayasudha as Goddess Lakshmi
- Jayaprada as Goddess Padmavathi
- Sangeetha as Goddess Bhudevi
- Nandamuri Balakrishna as Narada Maharshi
- Satyanarayana as Ugla Khan
- Gummadi as Hathiram Bhavaji
- Mukkamala as Muslim Priest
- Mikkilineni as Aakasa Raju
- Dhulipala as Bhrigu Maharshi
- Allu Ramalingaiyah as Gopanna
- P. J. Sarma
- Chalapathi Rao
- Anjali Devi as Vakula Devi
- Jayachitra as Yerukalasani
- Rama Prabha as Gowri
- Pushpalatha
- Manju Bhargavi as Goddess Parvathi

== Soundtrack ==
Sri Tirupati Venkateswara Kalyanam

Film score by Pendyala Nageswara Rao
- Released: 1979
- Genre: Soundtrack
- Length: 33:41
- Label: EMI Columbia Audio
- Producer: Pendyala Nageswara Rao

Music composed by Pendyala Nageswara Rao. Music released on EMI Columbia Audio Company.

S. No.	Song title	Lyrics	Singers	length
1	"Idhi Naa Hrudayam"	Devulapalli	S. P. Balasubrahmanyam, P. Susheela	3:07
2	"Entha Maduram"	C. Narayana Reddy	S. P. Balasubrahmanyam	3:19
3	"Ee Palle Vrepalle"	Devulapalli	P. Susheela	6:17
4	"Devudu Okade"	C. Narayana Reddy	Mohammed Rafi	3:08
5	"Narayana Srimannarayana"	C. Narayana Reddy	Madhavapeddi Ramesh	3:28
6	"Poyi Raave"	C. Narayana Reddy	P. Susheela	3:22
7	"Prabu Raanaina Raavu"	Devulapalli	P. Susheela	3:14
8	"Vesindi Gunnamami"	Kosaraju	P. Susheela, Vijayalakshmi Sarma	3:18
9	"Suprabhatham"	C. Narayana Reddy	S. P. Balasubrahmanyam, V. Ramakrishna, P. B. Sreenivas	4:28
10	"Eynadu Pondina Varamo"	Devulapalli	S. P. Balasubrahmanyam, P. Susheela	2:33
11	"Aa Toli Choope"	Devulapalli	S. P. Balasubrahmanyam, P. Susheela	3:32
12	"Aipoyindaipoyindi"	Kosaraju	S. P. Balasubrahmanyam, L. R. Eswari	3:45
