= Daana Veera Soora Karna =

1977 Indian film by N. T. Rama Rao

- Theatrical release poster
- Directed by: N. T. Rama Rao
- Written by: N. T. Rama Rao (story & screenplay); Kondaveeti Venkatakavi(dialogues)
- Based on: Life of Karna
- Produced by: N. T. Rama Rao
- Starring: N. T. Rama Rao; Nandamuri Balakrishna; Nandamuri Harikrishna; B. Saroja Devi; Prabha
- Cinematography: M. Kannappa
- Edited by: G. D. Joshi
- Music by: Pendyala Nageswara Rao
- Production company: Ramakrishna Cine Studios
- Distributed by: Mayuri
- Release date: 14 January 1977
- Running time: 227 minutes
- Country: India
- Language: Telugu
- Budget: ₹10 lakh
- Box office: est. ₹1.5–2 crore

Daana Veera Soora Karna (transl. Generous, heroic, and valiant Karna) is a 1977 Indian Telugu-language Hindu mythological film co-written, produced and directed by N. T. Rama Rao under his banner, Ramakrishna Cine Studios. Based on the life of Karna from the Mahabharata, the film stars Rama Rao in triple roles: the title character Karna, Duryodhana, and Krishna. The music was composed by Pendyala Nageswara Rao.

Principal photography of the film began in November 1976 and was completed on record breaking 43 working days. Produced, directed and starring Rama Rao in triple roles, the production required round the clock shooting with 18-20 hour daily shifts. To keep up with the rapid pace, the crew worked on multiple shifts, often editing the footage immediately without pre-screening the rushes, while production designers and painters finished massive backdrops just minutes before the camera rolled, with Rama Rao filming closeups while the art was still in progress and wide shots the moment it was completed.

The film focuses on Karna’s life, his tragic moral dilemmas, and his friendship with Duryodhana. Duryodhana, traditionally portrayed as an antagonist in the Mahabharata, is shown here in a more positive light as a knowledgeable and loyal friend to Karna. This sympathetic portrayal of Duryodhana, first introduced in Rama Rao's earlier film Sri Krishna Pandaveeyam (1966), is expanded upon in Daana Veera Soora Karna.

Produced on a budget of ₹10 lakh, Daana Veera Soora Karna became a significant commercial success, emerging as the highest-grossing Telugu film in history at the time, with a distributor share of ₹1.5–2 crore. The film received widespread critical acclaim for its performance and direction. The film is also revered for its high literary Telugu dialogues in Grandhikam, notably the elaborate monologues and verbal duels. It is the second Telugu film in history (after the 1963 Lava Kusa) to gross over ₹1 crore in its initial run. It is widely regarded as a classic in Telugu mythological cinema.

== Plot ==
A baby is discovered floating in the Ganga river by a charioteer named Adhiratha, who adopts and names the boy Karna. As Karna grows up, he witnesses the injustice of Dronacharya removing Ekalavya's thumb to ensure Arjuna becomes the foremost archer. Outraged by this act, Karna vows to one day surpass Arjuna.

Karna later becomes a student of Parasurama, seeking to master the art of archery. One day, while Parasurama sleeps, Indra, disguised as an insect, bites Karna. Despite the pain, Karna remains still to avoid waking his guru. When Parasurama sees the blood, he mistakenly believes Karna to be of the Kshatriya caste and curses that Karna's skills would fail him when he needs them the most. Although Parasurama later realizes that Karna is a Sūtaputra (son of a charioteer), he cannot revoke the curse.

During his travels, Karna attempts to save a Brahmin's cow from Indra, who is in the form of a lion. Failing to do so, Karna incurs another curse from the Brahmin, foretelling that Karna will die in a helpless situation. Additionally, Karna, moved by a young girl's distress, squeezes ghee from the soil to restore her spilled offering. For disturbing the earth, Bhudevi curses Karna that his chariot wheel will get stuck in the ground at a critical moment during battle.

At an archery competition in Hastinapuram, Karna arrives to challenge Arjuna but is insulted due to his lower birth. Duryodhana, the Kaurava prince, defends Karna by crowning him king of Anga. Grateful, Karna pledges his loyalty to Duryodhana, and the two become close friends. When Dharmaraja, the eldest Pandava, challenges Duryodhana to a dice game, Dharmaraja loses everything to Sakuni's manipulation, forcing the Pandavas into exile.

As tensions rise before the Kurukshetra War, Lord Krishna reveals Karna’s true parentage—he is Kunti's firstborn son and the eldest Pandava. However, Karna remains loyal to Duryodhana. During the war preparations, Bhishma, the Kaurava commander, refuses to allow Karna to fight, labeling him "Ardharatha" (half a charioteer), a term implying his lower status. Karna swears not to fight until Bhishma is incapacitated. After Bhishma falls on the battlefield, Karna receives his blessing and joins the war.

On the battlefield, Karna faces Abhimanyu, Arjuna’s son, who has been wreaking havoc on the Kaurava forces. Duryodhana orders Karna to destroy Abhimanyu's bow, which leads to Abhimanyu's death. Karna mourns the loss, recognizing Abhimanyu’s courage and lamenting his role in the young warrior's death.

Later, Kunti approaches Karna and begs him to join the Pandavas or at least spare them in battle. Karna agrees not to kill any of the Pandavas except Arjuna, promising that Kunti will still have five sons, whether he or Arjuna survives. During the subsequent battles, Karna repeatedly spares the lives of the Pandavas, though he defeats them in combat. After the deaths of his own sons at the hands of the Pandavas, Karna declares that he has sacrificed his sons for Kunti's.

Indra, disguised as a Brahmin, tricks Karna into surrendering his divine armor (Kavacha) and earrings (Kundala), which protect him from harm. In return, Indra gives him a powerful weapon, the Vasavi Sakthi, for one-time use. Though Karna hopes to use this weapon against Arjuna, he is forced to deploy it during a night attack, losing his advantage.

On the final day of battle, Salya, an uncle of the Pandavas, serves as Karna’s charioteer and demoralizes him, as per Krishna’s plan. Karna's accumulated curses take effect as his chariot wheel becomes stuck in the battlefield. In his moment of helplessness, Karna calls upon Arjuna to honour the warrior code and allow him to free his chariot, but Krishna urges Arjuna to strike. Arjuna kills Karna, aided by Krishna's guidance.

After Karna's death, Krishna explains Karna's sacrifices and valoir to Arjuna. Kunti reveals Karna’s true identity to the Pandavas, leading Dharmaraja to curse all women for keeping secrets. Karna's soul ascends to Surya, the Sun God. Duryodhana mourns the loss of his closest friend and attempts to abandon the war, but Krishna convinces him to continue.

In the final duel, Duryodhana chooses Bhima as his opponent. Following Krishna's advice, Bhima strikes Duryodhana's thigh, a dishonorable move that ultimately kills him. As Duryodhana lies dying, he questions Krishna's righteousness. After their deaths, Karna and Duryodhana are reunited in heaven, their unbreakable bond enduring beyond life.

== Cast ==
- N. T. Rama Rao as Srikrishna, Karna, and Duryodhana (triple role)
- M. Prabhakar Reddy as Dharma Raju
- Satyanarayana as Bhima
- Nandamuri Harikrishna as Arjuna
- Sarada as Draupadi
- S. Varalakshmi as Kunti
- Dhulipala Seetarama Sastry as Sakuni
- Gummadi as Parasurama
- Mikkilineni as Bhishma
- Mukkamala as Salya
- Rajanala as Drona
- Nandamuri Balakrishna as Abhimanyu
- P. J. Sarma as Vidura
- Chalapathi Rao as Indra, Adhiratha, Jarasandha, and Dhrishtadyumna (quadruple role)
- Jagga Rao as Dushasana
- Jaya Bhaskar as Ekalavya and Surya (dual role)
- Kanchana as Subhadra
- B. Saroja Devi as Vrishali (Cameo)
- Prabha as Bhanumati
- Rajasree
- Deepa as Uttara
- Jayamalini as Dancer
- Helen as Dancer

Chalapathi Rao performed four roles and also appeared in two other costumes as disguises of Indra, while Jaya Bhaskar did a dual role.

== Production ==
=== Development ===
Daana Veera Soora Karna was launched on 7 June 1976 at Ramakrishna Cine Studios in Hyderabad with M. G. Ramachandran giving the inaugural clap. It was the first shot at Ramakrishna Cine Studios. N. T. Rama Rao, who produced, directed, and played three key roles in the film (Karna, Krishna, and Duryodhana), intended to release the film for the Sankranti festival in 1977. During the planning stages, Rama Rao became aware that actor Krishna was preparing to make Kurukshetram (1977), with a story line similar to Dana Veera Soora Karna. This prompted Rama Rao to start the film immediately to ensure a timely release for Sankranti.

The film's dialogues were written by Kondaveeti Venkatakavi, a scholar and Sanskrit college principal, who initially declined the offer due to his atheistic beliefs but eventually agreed after Rama Rao's personal request. While most mythological and folkloric movies since the 1950s used colloquial language (Vaduka Bhasha), Daana Veera Soora Karna distinguished itself by employing a formal literary style (Granthika Bhasha) throughout.

=== Casting ===
Rama Rao initially wanted Akkineni Nageswara Rao to play Krishna in Daana Veera Soora Karna, but Nageswara Rao declined due to concerns over screen presence. Even after a request from Andhra Pradesh Chief Minister Jalagam Vengala Rao, who assured him that audiences would appreciate the collaboration, Nageswara Rao refused the role. However, Rama Rao later cast him as Chanakya in Chanakya Chandragupta (1977), a role Nageswara Rao had shown interest in.

B. Saroja Devi appeared in a brief cameo as Vrishali, Karna's wife. N. T. Rama Rao, with whom she shared a close friendship and longstanding professional association, often found roles for her in films he produced or directed. She accepted his request to appear in the film.

Harikrishna and Balakrishna, Rama Rao's sons, played the roles of Arjuna and Abhimanyu, respectively. This marked the second and final film where Rama Rao, Harikrishna, and Balakrishna worked together. Madala Ranga Rao was initially cast as Arjuna but was replaced by Harikrishna following a disagreement over Rama Rao's strict rule that all actors maintain a vegetarian diet during the production of the mythological film.

During the film’s production, Rama Rao imposed conditions on actors, including prohibiting them from working on Krishna's Kurukshetram simultaneously, as both films were being made at the same time. However, exception was made for Kaikala Satyanarayana, who acted in both films. Satyanarayana portrayed Bhima in Daana Veera Soora Karna and Duryodhana in Kurukshetram. Sarada, initially apprehensive about working with Rama Rao due to his strict nature, played the role of Draupadi and later became more comfortable after her first day's shoot.

=== Filming ===
Daana Veera Soora Karna was completed in 43 working days, a record at the time, considering that N. T. Rama Rao required at least three hours for makeup and two hours for removal for each of his three roles. Rama Rao typically did not review rushes before release, allowing the film to be edited quickly without pre-screening. The Mayasabha set was not finished during filming, so Rama Rao filmed close-ups while the paintings were still in progress and wide shots once they were completed. The film was shot entirely at Ramakrishna Cine Studios, with no major location shoots.

== Music ==
The film's music was composed by Pendyala Nageswara Rao, who completed the majority of the soundtrack. Initially, Saluri Rajeswara Rao contributed by composing the song "Ye Thalli Ninu Kannadho" along with many verses. However, only Pendyala Nageswara Rao's name appears in the title credits.

Daana Veera Soora Karna features ten songs and thirty-five verses, making it one of the most song-heavy films in Telugu cinema, surpassed only by Lava Kusa (1963). Many of the verses were adapted from Paandavodyoga Vijayam and Sree Krishna Raayabaram, written by the poet duo Tirupati Venkata Kavulu. Pundareekakshayya, who held the rights to these verses for Sri Krishnavataram (1967), was offered a blank cheque by Krishna for their use in Kurukshetram. However, he chose to give the rights to N. T. Rama Rao for free, allowing Daana Veera Soora Karna to use them.

No.	Song title	Lyrics	Singers	Length
1	"Ey Thalli Ninu Kannadho"	C. Narayana Reddy	P. Susheela	3:05
2	"Jayeebhava Vijayeebhava"	C. Narayana Reddy	S. P. Balasubrahmanyam, G. Anand	3:21
3	"Chithram Bhalaare Vichitram"	C. Narayana Reddy	S. P. Balasubrahmanyam, P. Susheela	3:23
4	"Telisenule Priyaa Rasikaa"	C. Narayana Reddy	S. Janaki, P. Susheela	4:32
5	"Raara Itu Raara"	C. Narayana Reddy	S. Janaki	3:23
6	"Anna Devudu Ledanna"	C. Narayana Reddy	S. Janaki	3:13
7	"Idhira Dhora Madhiraa"	C. Narayana Reddy	S. Janaki	3:58
8	"Eyla Santhaapammu"	C. Narayana Reddy	V. Ramakrishna	4:03
9	"Kalagantino Swamy"	Dasaradhi	Madhavapeddi Ramesh, P. Susheela	3:57

== Release ==
=== Reception ===
The film received widespread acclaim, particularly for N. T. Rama Rao's portrayal of three distinct characters and Kondaveeti Venkatakavi's powerful dialogues. Rama Rao's innovative reimagining of Duryodhana as "Suyodhana," a noble and virtuous leader, deviated from the traditional negative portrayal and was well-received by audiences. The film's complex and classical Telugu (Grandhikam) dialogues, while challenging for some viewers to follow, contributed to the film's authenticity and grandeur. These dialogues became immensely popular, with their recordings released on LP records and audio cassettes, which sold in large numbers.

=== Box Office ===
Daana Veera Soora Karna was censored on January 12, 1977, and released on January 14. Initially distributed with 30 prints, Gemini Labs could not print all of them in the limited time available. Consequently, the film was released in 14 centers on the first day and expanded to 16 centers the following day.

The film achieved significant box office success, running for 100 days in nine centers and 250 days at the Shanti Theatre in Hyderabad. This success solidified N. T. Rama Rao's reputation as a leading figure in mythological cinema. Produced on a budget of less than ₹10 lakh, Daana Veera Soora Karna grossed over ₹1 crore during its initial run. It was the second Telugu film to collect ₹1 crore after Lava Kusa (1963). For its 1994 re-release, the film once again earned over ₹1 crore in revenue.

== Awards ==
- P. Susheela won Nandi Award for Best Female Playback Singer for the song "Ye Thalli Ninu Kannado"
