= Sri Krishna Pandaveeyam =

1966 Telugu film by N. T. Rama Rao

- Theatrical release poster
- Directed by: N. T. Rama Rao
- Written by: Samudrala Sr. (story and dialogue)
- Screenplay by: N. T. Rama Rao
- Produced by: N. Trivikrama Rao
- Starring: N. T. Rama Rao; Udaykumar; S. Varalakshmi
- Cinematography: Ravikant Nagaich
- Edited by: G. D. Joshi
- Music by: T. V. Raju
- Production companies: NAT & Ramakrishna Cine Studios
- Release date: 13 January 1966
- Running time: 187 minutes
- Country: India
- Language: Telugu
- Budget: ₹10 lakh

Sri Krishna Pandaveeyam (transl. Lord Krishna and the Pandavas) is a 1966 Indian Telugu-language Hindu mythological film directed by N. T. Rama Rao, who also co-wrote the script with Samudrala Sr. Produced by N. Trivikrama Rao under the banners NAT and Ramakrishna Cine Studios, the film features N. T. Rama Rao, Uday Kumar, and S. Varalakshmi in lead roles, with music composed by T. V. Raju. Rama Rao portrays dual roles as Krishna and Duryodhana. The film marks the Telugu debut of actress K. R. Vijaya. Sri Krishna Pandaveeyam was a commercial success at the box office.

== Plot ==
The film depicts the adolescent years of the Pandavas and Krishna, focusing on events from the Mahabharata, particularly the later chapters of the Adi Parva and the first half of the Sabha Parva.

ACT I

The opening shot shows Kunti praying for Lord Krishna's protection of the Pandavas. Lord Krishna consoles Kunti and promises to protect the Pandavas and guide them through troubles and challenges they may face in their lives.

The story of Sakuni

The sons of Pandu and Dhrutarashtra's progeny get into an argument. When Duryodhana insults the Pandavas by calling them "dependents", Bhima counters by saying that, the Kauravas are the progeny of a widow. Duryodhana asks Veda Vyasa for an explanation. Vyasa reveals that, due to an astrological defect, his mother, Gandhari, was first married to a sheep before marrying his father Dhritarashtra. This revelation fuels Duryodhana animosity towards Gandhara, the kingdom ruled by his maternal grandfather.

Duryodhana attacks Gandhara, lays waste to the kingdom, and imprisons its royal family, providing them only one rice grain per prisoner, which is the leftover food of the Kaurava clan. The prisoners fight for the few rice grains thrown at them. The king of Gandhara, in a desperate move, decides that instead of everyone dying, one prince should be kept alive. He selects Sakuni, who swears vengeance against the Kauravas. Sakuni's family dies in prison, and he later uses his father's spinal cord to create magical dice that always roll in his favor. Duryodhana takes pity on Sakuni, who joins him, Karna, and Dussasana in their evil plans.

The wax house

Sakuni devises a plan to kill the Pandavas by tricking them. He builds a wax house Varanasi and orders the Pandavas to go on pilgrimage. Krishna sees through the plot and warns Bhima to stay vigilant. Bhima digs a tunnel from the wax house to a nearby forest, and as predicted, the house is set on fire as ordered by Duryodhana. However, Bhima carries his brothers and mother to safety through the tunnel and takes them to a hiding spot in the jungle.

Hidimbi

In this forest, a cannibal rakshasa named Hidimbasura lived with his sister Hidimbi. He smells the scent of human beings and orders his sister to bring them to him. However, Hidimbi falls in love with Bhima at first sight. Unable to wait any longer, Hidimbasura comes to kill the Pandavas himself. Bhima, however, easily kills him. Hidimbi then marries Bhima, and later gives birth to Ghatotkacha.

ACT II

The film shifts focus to Lord Krishna as the primary character for a while.

The courtship of Rukmini

Sisupala, the king of Chedi, and Rukmi, are kings under the emperor Jarasandha. They all harbor deep hatred for Krishna. Jarasandha proposes that Rukmi marry his sister, Rukmini, to Sisupala, unaware that she is in love with Krishna. Narada mediates between the lovers, and after a brief courtship, Rukmini elopes with Krishna. Rukmi challenges Krishna to a fight, but Krishna easily defeats him and, although he spares his life on the request of his wife, Krishna humiliates Rukmi by shaving half of his hair.

ACT III

The movie returns to its primary focus on the Pandavas, with Duryodhana occupying a significant portion of screen time towards the end.

The slaying of Bakasura

Bakasura, Bhima, Kichaka, Jarasandha, and Duryodhana are all interconnected by fate. According to a prophecy known only to Krishna, the first among these five to kill another will eventually be responsible for the death of the other three. During their exile, the Pandavas live disguised as sadhus in a remote village. The village is terrorized by Bakasura, a powerful monster who demands two oxen, a cartload of food, and a human sacrifice daily to satiate his hunger. When it is the turn of the Pandavas' host family to provide the human sacrifice, Kunti intervenes, offering one of her sons instead, as she has five children and wishes to spare the host's only child. Bhima is sent to face Bakasura. On his way, Bhima consumes all the food meant for the monster. A fierce battle ensues, and Bhima ultimately slays Bakasura, emerging victorious.

Draupadi

The king of Panchala, Drupada, announces an archery contest to determine the suitor for his daughter, Draupadi. During the contest, Krishna intervenes and deceives Karna, causing him to lose. Arjuna, disguised as a Brahmin youth, successfully completes the challenge and wins the contest, securing Draupadi's hand in marriage. Upon returning home, Arjuna informs his mother, Kunti, that he has won a "prize." Unaware that he is referring to Draupadi, Kunti instructs him to share it with his brothers. Due to this misunderstanding, and in accordance with the customs of the time, Draupadi becomes the wife of all five Pandavas.

Indraprastha

After emerging from their period of disguise, the Pandavas are granted a share of the Kaurava kingdom. They establish and develop the city of Indraprastha as their capital.

The slaying of Jarasandha

Jarasandha is considered one of Krishna's primary adversaries. According to the legend, only Bhima or the other three warriors mentioned earlier are capable of defeating him. Krishna is said to have retreated to Dwaraka due to repeated threats and failures in defeating Jarasandha. In one instance, Bhima and Krishna disguise themselves as Brahmins (purohits) and infiltrate Jarasandha's fortress. There request a duel, and Jarasandha selects Bhima as his opponent. During their fierce combat, Krishna signals Bhima to tear Jarasandha's body vertically into two pieces to ensure his demise. However, due to a boon, Jarasandha's body parts rejoin, and he returns to life. After several failed attempts, Krishna advises Bhima to throw Jarasandha's torn body parts in opposite directions, preventing them from rejoining. This strategy proves successful, and Jarasandha is finally killed.

Rajasuya Yaga

Dharmaraju (Yudhisthira) performs the Rajasuya Yaga to be crowned as the emperor. The Kauravas attend the ceremony as guests at Indraprastha. During their visit, Duryodhana explores the Mayasabha, a grand hall known for its exquisite sculptures and architectural brilliance. While leaving, Duryodhana accidentally trips and falls into a pool. He hears some people laughing and sees Draupadi is among the crowd. Feeling deeply humiliated, Duryodhana vows to seek revenge in the presence of his brothers, Karna, and Shakuni.

The slaying of Sisupala

Sisupala is a relative of Krishna, born with numerous physical abnormalities. When Krishna touches him during his childhood, the child is restored to normal. However, due to a broken curse, Krishna is destined to eventually kill Sisupala. Despite this, Krishna promises Sisupala's mother that he will give her son a hundred chances before taking his life.

When Dharmaraju elects Krishna as the chief guest at the Rajasuya Yaga, Sisupala becomes enraged and insults Krishna. Krishna silently counts the hundred offenses that Sisupala hurls at him. Upon the hundredth insult, Krishna uses his Sudarsana Chakra towards him, his divine discus, to sever Sisupala's head. In response to Duryodhana's call for Krishna's arrest, Krishna reveals his Visvarupa, his universal form, displaying his divine power.

== Cast ==
- N. T. Rama Rao as Lord Krishna and Duryodhana (dual role)
- Uday Kumar as Bhima
- S. Varalakshmi as Kunti
- K. R. Vijaya as Rukmini
- Rajanala as Sisupala
- Kaikala Satyanarayana as Rukmi
- Mukkamala as Jarasandha
- Mikkilineni as Bhishma
- Kantha Rao as Narada
- Prabhakar Reddy as Karna
- Sobhan Babu as Arjuna
- M. Balayya as Dharmaraju
- Dhulipala as Sakuni
- Vangara as Agnidyotanudu
- K. V. S. Sarma as Drona
- A. V. Subba Rao Jr. as Vidura
- Jagga Rao as Dussasana
- Geetanjali
- Ratna as Hidimbi
- Swarna as Draupadi
- Bharathi as dancer
- V. Nagaiah as Rukmini's father

== Music ==
Sri Krishna Pandaveeyam

Film score by T. V. Raju
- Released: 1966
- Genre: Soundtrack
- Length: 37:45
- Label: Saregama Audio
- Producer: T. V. Raju

Music was composed by T. V. Raju. Audio soundtrack was released on Saregama label.

S. No.	Song title	Lyrics	Singers	length
1	"Mattu Vadalara Niddura"	Kosaraju	Ghantasala	3:58
2	"Changure Bangaru Raja"	C. Narayana Reddy	Jikki	5:11
3	"Priyurala Siggelane"	Samudrala Sr	Ghantasala, P. Susheela	4:43
4	"Nallanivadena"	Samudrala Sr.	Jikki, L. R. Eswari	4:01
5	"Bhala Bhala Naa Bandi"	Kosaraju	Madhavapeddi Satyam	4:24
6	"Swagatam Suswagatam"	C. Narayaana Reddy	P. Susheela, P. Leela	6:43

== Reception ==
The film had run 100 days in 9 centers and garnered positive critical acclaim for its direction and acting prowess.

The title of the 2019 film Mathu Vadalara was inspired by a song of the same name from this film.

== Accolades ==
- Nandi Award for Second Best Feature Film – Silver won by N. Trivikrama Rao.
