= Simham Navvindi =

- Theatrical release poster
- Directed by: D. Yoganand
- Written by: Paruchuri brothers(dialogues)
- Screenplay by: D. Yoganand
- Story by: D. Yoganand
- Produced by: Nandamuri Harikrishna
- Starring: N. T. Rama Rao; Nandamuri Balakrishna; Kala Ranjani
- Cinematography: Nandamuri Mohana Krishna
- Edited by: R. Vithal
- Music by: Chakravarthy
- Production company: Ramakrishna Cine Studios
- Release date: 3 March 1983
- Running time: 128 minutes
- Country: India
- Language: Telugu

Simham Navvindi (transl. The Lion has Laughed) is a 1983 Indian Telugu-language comedy drama film, produced by Nandamuri Harikrishna under the Ramakrishna Cine Studios banner and directed by D. Yoganand. It stars N. T. Rama Rao, Nandamuri Balakrishna and Kala Ranjani, with music composed by Chakravarthy. The film was remade in Tamil as Raja Mariyadhai in 1987.

== Cast ==
- N. T. Rama Rao as Narasimham
- Nandamuri Balakrishna as Balakrishna
- Kala Ranjani as Radha
- Allu Ramalingaiyah as Parvathalu
- Nutan Prasad as Lingaiah
- Thyagaraju
- Rallapalli as Gantaiah
- KK Sarma as Girisam
- Prabha as Swapna
- Annapurna as Balakrishna's grandmother
- Mamatha as Kanakamma
- Kakinada Shymala as Narasimham's sister
- Sri Lakshmi as Buchamma

== Soundtrack ==
Music composed by Chakravarthy.

| Song title | Lyrics | Singers | length |
|---|---|---|---|
| "Guvva Guvva Ekkadike" | C. Narayana Reddy | Nandamuri Raja, S. Janaki | 3:40 |
| "Hey Bhamchuku Bham" | C. Narayana Reddy | Nandamuri Raja, S. Janaki | 3:49 |
| "Jabili Vachindi" | C. Narayana Reddy | Nandamuri Raja, S. Janaki | 4:05 |
| "Munjalanti Chinnadana" | Veturi | S. P. Balasubrahmanyam, P. Susheela | 4:00 |
| "Okkasari Navvu" | C. Narayana Reddy | Nandamuri Raja, S. Janaki | 3:54 |
| "Ela Ela Neekundi" | C. Narayana Reddy | Nandamuri Raja, S. Janaki | 4:00 |
