= V. Ramakrishna =

Ramakrishna Vissamraju
- Born: 20 August 1947; Vizianagaram, Madras Presidency, British India (present-day Andhra Pradesh)
- Died: 16 July 2015 (aged 67) Hyderabad, India
- Genres: Playback
- Occupations: Singer; actor; music director; voice actor; producer
- Relatives: P. Susheela (Aunt)

Ramakrishna Vissamraju (20 August 1947 – 16 July 2015) was a playback singer in South India.

== Personal life and career ==
Ramakrishna was born to Vissamraju Rangasayi and Ratnam on 20 August 1947. Ganakokila P.Suseela is his mother's sister.

He received a Bachelor of Science degree but decided to become a professional singer, a decision influenced by his admiration for Ghantasala. He sang light music for All India Radio.

Ramakrishna's debut movie song was "Vayase Oka Poolathota" in Vichitra Bandham in 1972. Throughout his career, he performed over 5000 songs in movies and devotional albums and has given numerous stage shows across Andhra Pradesh. He was a playback singer for Telugu actors such as NTR, ANR, Sobhan Babu, and Krishnam Raju. And also Krishna

Later in life, he took up acting and appeared in television series and films. He continued to give concerts across Andhra Pradesh.

In 1976, he married Jyothi Khanna, who was also a singer. The couple had two children, Lekha, and Sai Kiran, who made his acting début in Nuvve Kaavali in 2001.

Another prominent singer, S. P. Balasubrahmanyam, also recorded a song that had previously been selected for Ramakrishna, and he later performed a song originally sung by Ramakrishna.

== Filmography ==
Year	Film	Song/s
1972	Vichitra Bandham	"Vayase Oka Poolathota"
	Tata Manavadu	"Anubandham Atmiyata Anta Oma Bootakam", "Yemito Ee Lokamanta Yentaku Antu Pattani Vinta"
1973	Andala Ramudu	"Edagadanikendukura Tondara", "Kurise Vennello Merise Godarilaa", "Mamu Brovamani Cheppave Seetamma Talli", "Samooha Bhojanammu Santoshmaina Vindu", "Ramudemannadoi Seetaramudemannadoi"
	Bhakta Tukaram	"Manasuna Neeve", "Neeve Aadi Daivamu", "Panduranga Naamam", "Pilupu Vinagaleva", "Shyama Sundara"
	Palletoori Bava	"Ose vayyaari rangi"
	Sharada	"Sharada", "Nanu Cheraga Emitamma Sigga"
1974	Kannavaari Kalalu	"Andaalu kanuvindu chesthunte, Sorry so sorry, Okanaati maata kaadu, Madhuvolakabosey nee chilipi kallu"
	Krishnaveni	"Krishnaveni Teluginti Viriboni"
	Alluri Seetharama Raju	"Telugu Veera Levara Deeksha Pooni Saagara"
	Andaru Dongale	
	Chakravakam	"Kothaga Pellaina Kurravaniki", "Veenaleni Teeganu Neevuleni Bratukunu", "Veenalona Teegalona Ekkadunnadi Ragamu"
1975	Balipeetam	"Chandamama Raave Jabilli Raave"
	Gunavanthudu	
1975	Yashoda Krishna	
	Muthyala Muggu	"Edo Edo Annadhi"
1976	Bhakta Kannappa	"Siva Siva Sankara Bhaktava Sankara"
	Mahakavi Kshetrayya	
	Mahathmudu	"Chitti Paapaa", "Enthagaa Choosthunnaa", "Edhurugaa Neevunte", "Manishi Manishiga"
	Secretary	"Naa Pakkana Chotunnadi Okkarike", "Manasuleni Devudu Manishikenduko Manasicchadu"
1977	Chakradhari	
	Amaradeepam	"Inthe Ee Jeevithamu Chivariki Anta Soonyamu", "Naa Jeevana Sandhya Samayamlo Oka Devatha Udayinchindi"
1977	Daana Veera Soora Karna	
		"Idekkadi Nyayam", "Andalanni Nilone Dagunnai", "Yepudaina Oka Kshnamaina"
1978	Karunamayudu	"Puvvulakanna Punnami Vennelakanna"
1978	Vayasu Pilichindi	"Jeevitham Madhusala"
1980	Yuvatharam Kadilindi	"Ashayala Pandirilo Anuragam Sandadilo"
1984	Shrimad Virat Veerabrahmendra Swami Charitra	"Cheppaledani Anakapoyeru", "Mayadari Marala Bandira", "Nandamaya Garuda Nandamaya", "Shiva Govinda Govinda", "Vinara Vinara O Naruda"
1986	Sri Shirdi Saibaba Mahathyam	"Jai Shirdi Naadha Saideva" (Dandakam)
1987	Vishwanatha Nayakudu	Poems in the Rayala court scene
1988	"Bava Marudula Sawal"	
1996	"Ninne Pelladatha"	

== Death ==
He died on 16 July 2015, having suffered from cancer for ten months and having been admitted to Banjara Hills Omega Hospitals. He was 67 and is survived by his wife, son Sai Kiran and daughter Lekha.
