= Rowdy Ramudu Konte Krishnudu =

- Theatrical release poster
- Directed by: K. Raghavendra Rao
- Written by: Jandhyala (dialogues)
- Screenplay by: K. Raghavendra Rao
- Story by: Jandhyala; Satyanand
- Produced by: N. T. Rama Rao
- Starring: N. T. Rama Rao; Nandamuri Balakrishna; Sridevi
- Cinematography: K. S. Prakash
- Edited by: Ravi
- Music by: Chakravarthy
- Production company: Ramakrishna Cine Studios
- Release date: 15 August 1980
- Running time: 142 minutes
- Country: India
- Language: Telugu

Rowdy Ramudu Konte Krishnudu is a 1980 Indian Telugu-language action film produced by N. T. Rama Rao under his Ramakrishna Cine Studios banner and directed by K. Raghavendra Rao. It stars N. T. Rama Rao, Nandamuri Balakrishna and Sridevi. The music composed by Chakravarthy.

== Cast ==
- N. T. Rama Rao as Ramu
- Nandamuri Balakrishna as Balakrishna
- Sridevi as Mutyalu
- Rajyalakshmi as Lakshmi
- Rao Gopal Rao as Bhaji Prasad
- Satyanarayana as Satyanayana
- Jaggayya as I.G.
- Kanta Rao as Ramu's father
- Mukkamala as Baba
- Nutan Prasad as Giri
- Raavi Kondala Rao as Jailor
- Chalapathi Rao as Hargopal
- Prasad Babu as Madhav
- Lakshmi Kanth as Ranga
- Sarathi
- Chitti Babu
- Chidatala Appa Rao as Kotigadu
- Potti Prasad
- Jagga Rao
- Jayasudha as special appearance
- Latha as Special appearance
- Pushpalatha as Heroes mother
- Jayamalini as item number

== Soundtrack ==
Rowdy Ramudu Konte Krishnudu

Film score by Chakravarthy
- Released: 1980
- Genre: Soundtrack
- Length: 30:35
- Label: EMI Columbia Audio
- Producer: Chakravarthy

Chakravarthy chronology
Superman (1980)	Rowdy Ramudu Konte Krishnudu (1980)	Sardar Papa Rayudu (1980)

Music composed by Chakravarthy. Lyrics written by Veturi.

S. No.	Song title	Singers	length
1	"Ooo My Darling"	S. P. Balasubrahmanyam, P. Susheela	4:13
2	"Konte Korikundi"	S. P. Balasubrahmanyam, P. Susheela	4:15
3	"Pappulo Uppesi"	S. P. Balasubrahmanyam, P. Susheela	4:20
4	"Jingala Jamjam"	S. P. Balasubrahmanyam, P. Susheela	4:50
5	"Apoorva Sahodarulam"	S. P. Balasubrahmanyam, Madhavapeddi Ramesh	3:35
6	"Ammo Idhe Menaka"	S. P. Balasubrahmanyam, Madhavapeddi Ramesh, P. Susheela	5:30
7	"Seetakalam Vachindi"	S. P. Balasubrahmanyam, P. Susheela	3:52

== Reception ==
On 22 August 1980, Griddaluru Gopalrao of Zamin Ryot criticised director Raghavendra Rao for making a "shoddy film". Sridhara of Sitara in his review dated 31 August 1980 gave a more mixed review for the film.
