= Mallammana Pavaada =

- Directed by: Puttanna Kanagal
- Written by: B. Puttaswamayya
- Screenplay by: P. Pullaiah
- Based on: Ardhaangi by B. Puttaswamayya
- Starring: Rajkumar; Saroja Devi; Vajramuni
- Cinematography: V. Selvaraj
- Edited by: V. P. Krishnan; R. Shanmugam
- Music by: Vijaya Bhaskar
- Release date: 1969
- Running time: 130 minutes
- Country: India
- Language: Kannada

Mallammana Pavaada ( transl. The miracle of Mallamma) is a 1969 Kannada film, directed by Puttanna Kanagal. This was the debut movie of actor Vajramuni. This was Puttana's first collaboration with Dr. Rajkumar and Saroja Devi as an independent director.

The film is based on B. Puttaswamayya's Kannada novel Ardhangi which was a translation of Manilal Bannerjee's Bengali novel Swayamsidda. The screenplay was written by P. Pullaiah based on his 1955 Telugu movie with a similar story titled Ardhangi which was based on Maddipatla Suri's Telugu translation of the Bengali novel Swayamsidda by Manilal Banerjee. The novel Swayamsiddha was also adapted in Bengali in 1975 with the same title and in Hindi in 1981 as Jyoti. Ardhangi was remade in Tamil as Pennin Perumai and in Hindi as Bahurani (1963). The Kannada novel Ardhangi also inspired the 1987 Tamil movie Enga Chinna Rasa which went on to be remade in Telugu as Abbaigaru, in Hindi as Beta, in Kannada as Annayya and in Odia as Santana (1998).

== Plot ==
Chandrakanth (Rajkumar) is the dull-witted elder son of the village landlord. He is constantly harassed by his stepbrother Suryakanth (Vajramuni) with the approval of Chandrakanth's stepmother, Meenakshi (Advani Lakshmi Devi). Chandrakanth's father (Sampath) intervenes in his favor, but is unable to stop Suryakanth. Suryakanth also belittles the villagers for not paying taxes, until a villager - Mallamma - stands up to him. This surprises Suryakanth's father who goes to Mallamma's house to investigate. There, he learns that Mallamma is an educated girl with strong traditional values and decides she would be the perfect wife for Suryakanth. However, Meenakshi is disdainful towards the pairing because Mallamma comes from a poor village household. She convinces her husband to marry Mallamma to Chandrakanth.

During the marriage, Chandrakanth's antics nearly lead to the marriage being called off, but Mallamma insists on marrying Chandrakanth. After the marriage, Mallamma learns the reason for Chandrakanth's mental disabilities from his caretaker, Thayamma. As a child, when Chandrakanth lost his mother, his father married again and Meenakshi, his stepmother, fed him sedatives like opium to keep him quiet which stunted his development. Mallamma immediately asks her father, a physician, to send medicines to treat Chandrakanth. She also spends time educating Chandrakanth to make up for his lost formative years. Chandrakanth makes a full recovery and becomes a learned man. Meenakshi is jealous of Chandrakanth's recovery and complains to her husband about an altercation with Mallamma. Her husband goes to Mallamma to punish her for her insolence. However, he learns the full story of the altercation from Mallamma, and discovers the recovery made by his son - which he terms Mallamma's miracle (Mallammana Pavaada).

Suryakanth is deeply hurt by Chandrakanth's recovery because his father favors Chandrakanth and Mallamma instead of him, so he leaves the house and goes to his lover, Rajivi's home. Meenakshi is devastated by Suryakanth's departure and admonishes her husband and tries to leave; her husband, while trying to stop her, trips on the stairs and is bedridden. On his deathbed, he asks to see Suryakanth, but he refuses to come. After he passes away, Chandrakanth attempts to bring Suryakanth home for Meenakshi's sake, but Suryakanth says he'll return only if Mallamma leaves the house. Chandrakanth accepts and leaves the house with Mallamma, and Suryakanth returns to his mother's joy. However, he also brings Rajivi's family with him and forces his mother out. Meenakshi realizes her mistake of pushing Chandrakanth and goes and apologizes to him.

Back home, Suryakanth catches Rajivi's family looting his valuables and learns that they are tricksters who try to get in the good books of village heads, only to rob them and flee. His househelp - Shivalingi (Dwarakish) - sees these events unfold and informs Chandrakanth and the villagers, who come to Suryakanth's rescue. After apprehending Rajivi's family and recovering the stolen goods, Chandrakanth attempts to leave but Suryakanth, having understood his mistake, begs him and Mallamma to return, reuniting the family.

== Cast ==
- Rajkumar as Chandrakantha "Chandra"
- B. Saroja Devi as Mallamma
- Sampath as Chandra's father
- Vajramuni as Suryakanth "Surya"
- Advani Lakshmi Devi as Meenakshi, Surya's mother and Chandra's step mother
- T. N. Balakrishna as Rajivi's father
- H. R. Shastry as Chandrashekhara
- Anantharam Maccheri
- Dwarakish as Shivalingi
- Udaya Chandrika as Rajivi
- R. T. Rama
- Shanthamma as Thayamma

== Soundtrack ==
The music was composed by Vijaya Bhaskar with lyrics written by Kanagal Prabhakar Shastri and Vijaya Narasimha.

S. No	Song title	Singers
1	Naanoonu Nim Haage	P. B. Sreenivas
2	Sharanembe Naa	P. Susheela
3	Haadona Olavina	P. B. Sreenivas, P. Susheela
4	Huchcharalla Neevu	P. Susheela
5	Mareyada Maathadu	B. K. Sumitra
6	Ee Roopa Rashi	L. R. Eswari

== Other versions ==
The story line has been inspiration for various movies and has had various remakes in Indian film industry.

Year	Title	Language	Director	Cast		
Year	Title	Language	Director	Step-mother	Son	Wife
1955	Ardhangi	Telugu	P. Pullaiah	Santha Kumari	Akkineni Nageswara Rao	Savitri
1956	Pennin Perumai	Tamil	P. Pullaiah	Santha Kumari	Gemini Ganesan	Savitri
1963	Bahurani	Hindi	T. Prakash Rao	Lalita Pawar	Guru Dutt	Mala Sinha
1969	Mallammana Pavaada	Kannada	Puttanna Kanagal	Advani Lakshmi Devi	Rajkumar	B Sarojadevi
1975	Swayamsiddha	Bengali	Sushil Mukherjee		Ranjit Mallick	Mithu Mukherjee
1981	Jyothi	Hindi	Pramod Chakravorty	Shashikala	Jeetendra	Hema Malini
1987	Enga Chinna Rasa	Tamil	K. Bhagyaraj	C. R. Saraswathy	K. Bhagyaraj	Radha
1992	Beta	Hindi	Indra Kumar	Aruna Irani	Anil Kapoor	Madhuri Dixit
1993	Abbaigaru	Telugu	E. V. V. Satyanarayana	Jayachitra	Venkatesh	Meena
1993	Annayya	Kannada	D. Rajendra Babu	Aruna Irani	V. Ravichandran	Madhoo
1998	Santan	Oriya		Snigdha Mohanty	Siddhanta Mahapatra	Rachana Banerjee

== See also ==
- Rajkumar
- B. Saroja Devi
- Vajramuni
- Cinema of Karnataka
