= Bahurani (1963 film) =

1963 film by T. Prakash Rao

- Poster
- Directed by: T. Prakash Rao
- Written by: Inder Raj Anand
- Story by: Manilal Banerjee
- Based on: Swayamsiddha (novel) by Manilal Banerjee
- Starring: Guru Dutt; Mala Sinha; Feroz Khan
- Music by: C. Ramchandra
- Distributed by: Meena Movies
- Release date: 1963
- Running time: 132 minutes
- Country: India
- Language: Hindi

Bahurani (transl. Daughter-in-law) is a 1963 Indian Hindi-language drama film directed by T. Prakash Rao. It stars Guru Dutt, Mala Sinha, Feroz Khan in pivotal roles. It is a remake of the Telugu movie Ardhangi, which was based on Maddipatla Suri's Telugu translation of the Bengali novel Swayamsiddha written by Manilal Banerjee. Swayamsiddha went on to be adapted into a 1975 Bengali movie of same name and later in Hindi as Jyoti in 1981. Ardhangi was also remade earlier in Tamil as Pennin Perumai. In Malayalam, Prem nazir and Ragini starrer Saraswathi (film) 1970 also based on this movie .

== Plot ==
Zamindar has two sons — Raghu, by his first wife and Vikram, by his second wife. Raghu is a simple-minded and innocent young man. Vikram is cruel, domineering, selfish and greedy and he maltreats everyone, from servants to his own brother Raghu. Vikram's vicious mother Rajeshwari does the same.

After Vikram has a feud with a tough and smart village girl named Padma, who is the first person to ever confront him, Zamindar gets the idea of marrying Vikram and Padma. Vikram refuses and after a series of incidents, Padma marries Raghu instead. When she understands how her husband has been treated over the years, she vows to set things right and in the process falls in love with him. Inspired by her love, fearlessness and no-nonsense attitude, Raghu begins to find the courage to resist his oppressors.

== Cast ==
- Guru Dutt as Raghu
- Mala Sinha as Padma
- Feroz Khan as Vikram
- Nazir Hussain as Zamindar
- Lalita Pawar as Rajeshwari
- Shivraj as Diwan
- Mukri as Sukhiya
- Agha as Banwarilal
- Badri Prasad as Vaid
- Shyama as Chanda Bai
- Manorama as Chanda's Mother
- Pratima Devi as Dai Maa
- Nazir Kashmiri as Kalicharan

== Awards ==
- Nominated, Filmfare Best Actress Award - Mala Sinha

== Music ==
The songs were composed by C. Ramchandra with lyrics authored by Sahir Ludhianvi.

Song	Singer
"Eetal Ke Ghal Mein Teetal"	Hemant Kumar
"Umra Hui Tumse Mile, Phir Bhi Jane Kyun"	Lata Mangeshkar, Hemant Kumar
"Main Jagoon Saari Rain"	Lata Mangeshkar
"Balma Anari Man Bhaye"	Lata Mangeshkar
"Bane Aisa Samaaj, Mile Sab Ko Anaaj, Na Ho Loot, Na Ho Phoot, Na Ho Jhuth To Ji Kaisa Ho"	Lata Mangeshkar, Asha Bhosle, Manna Dey
"Yeh Husn Mera, Yeh Ishq Tera"	Asha Bhosle
"Kaam Krodh Aur Lobh"	Mahendra Kapoor

== Other versions ==
The story line has been inspiration for various movies and has had various remakes in Indian film industry.

Year	Title	Language	Director	Cast		
Year	Title	Language	Director	Step-mother	Son	Wife
1955	Ardhangi	Telugu	P. Pullaiah	Santha Kumari	Akkineni Nageswara Rao	Savitri
1956	Pennin Perumai	Tamil	P. Pullaiah	Santha Kumari	Sivaji Ganesan	Savitri
1969	Mallammana Pavaada	Kannada	Puttanna Kanagal	Advani Lakshmi Devi	Rajkumar	B Sarojadevi
1970	Saraswathi (film)	Bengali	Thikkurissy Sukumaran Nair	Meena	Prem Nazir	Ragini (actress)
1975	Swayamsiddha	Bengali	Sushil Mukherjee	Chhaya Devi	Ranjit Mallick	Mithu Mukherjee
1981	Jyothi	Hindi	Pramod Chakravorty	Shashikala	Jeetendra	Hema Malini
1987	Enga Chinna Rasa	Tamil	K. Bhagyaraj	C. R. Saraswathy	K. Bhagyaraj	Radha
1992	Beta	Hindi	Indra Kumar	Aruna Irani	Anil Kapoor	Madhuri Dixit
1993	Abbaigaru	Telugu	E. V. V. Satyanarayana	Jayachitra	Venkatesh	Meena
1993	Annayya	Kannada	D. Rajendra Babu	Aruna Irani	V. Ravichandran	Madhoo
1998	Santan	Oriya		Snigdha Mohanty	Siddhanta Mahapatra	Rachana Banerjee
