= Sarangadhara (1957 film) =

- Theatrical release poster
- Directed by: V. S. Raghavan; K. S. Ramachandra Rao
- Written by: Samudrala Sr (story / dialogues)
- Screenplay by: V. S. Raghavan
- Produced by: T. Namadeva Reddy
- Starring: P. Bhanumathi; N. T. Rama Rao
- Cinematography: H. N. Srivatsava; N. C. Balakrishnan
- Edited by: V. S. Rajan
- Music by: Ghantasala
- Production company: Minerva Pictures
- Release date: 1 November 1957
- Country: India
- Language: Telugu

Sarangadhara is a 1957 Indian Telugu-language historical drama film, produced by T. Namadeva Reddy, directed by V. S. Raghavan and K. S. Ramachandra Rao. It stars P. Bhanumathi and N. T. Rama Rao with music composed by Ghantasala. The film is based on the epic of the same name by Gurajada Apparao.

== Cast ==
- P. Bhanumathi as Chitrangi Devi
- N. T. Rama Rao as Sarangadhara
- S. V. Ranga Rao as Rajaraja Narendra Chalukya
- Relangi as Mandavya
- Gummadi as Mahamantri Singanna
- Mikkilineni as Nannaya Bhattaraka
- Mukkamala as Ganganna
- Chalam as Subuddhi
- Santha Kumari as Ratnangi Devi
- Rajasulochana as Kanakangi
- Surabhi Balasaraswati as Malathi

== Soundtrack ==
Sarangadhara

Film score by Ghantasala
- Released: 1955
- Genre: Soundtrack
- Label: His Master's Voice
- Producer: Ghantasala

Music composed by Ghantasala. Lyrics written by Samudrala Sr. Music released on His Master's Voice.

S. No.	Song title	Singers	length
1	"Adugadugo Alladigo"	Bhanumathi Ramakrishna	3.16
2	"Oh Naa Raaja"	Bhanumathi Ramakrishna	3.09
3	"Jaya Jaya Mangala Gowri"	P. Leela	2.33
4	"Annaana Bhamini"	Ghantasala, P. Leela	3.22
5	"Kalalu Karigipovuna"	Ghantasala, Santha Kumari, Jikki	2.26
6	"Sagenu Bala"	Jikki	2:35
7	"Jagamu Naa"	Ghantasala	1:32
8	"Valadamma"	Ghantasala	0:47
9	"Kaavaka"	Ghantasala	0:47
10	"Raajipudu Raaledu"	Madhavapeddi Satyam	0:48
11	"Allana Gaadhiraaja"	Ghantasala, Bhanumathi Ramakrishna	2:03
12	"Dhanalubdula Vruddula"	M. S. Rama Rao	0:45
13	"Gagana Seemantinee"	Ghantasala	0:34
14	"O Chinna Vaada"	Madhavapeddi Satyam, Swarnalata	2:52
15	"Poyiraa Maayammaa"	P. Leela	3:09
16	"Mangalamu Magalamu"	Chorus	1:44
