= Sarangadhara (1937 film) =

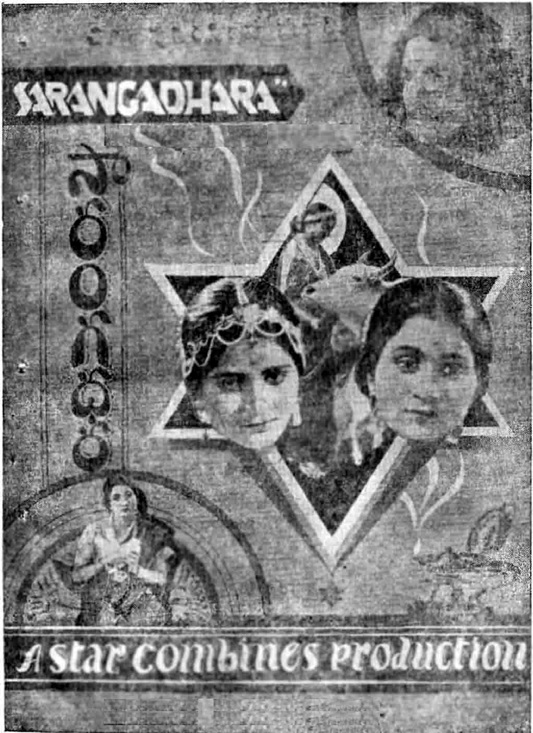
- poster of Sarangadhara
- Directed by: P. Pullayya
- Written by: Tapi Dharmarao
- Produced by: Ramayya
- Starring: Banda Kanakalingeswara Rao; Santha Kumari; Kannamba; Sriranjani; Addanki Srirama Murthy; Pulipati Venkateswarlu
- Music by: Akula Narasimha Rao
- Production company: Star Combines
- Distributed by: Star Combines
- Release date: 1937
- Country: India
- Language: Telugu

Sarangadhara (Telugu: సారంగధర, lit. bearer of a beautiful body) is a 1937 Telugu-language film directed by P. Pullayya under Star Combines. Banda Kanakalingeswara Rao and Santha Kumari played the lead roles, supported by Addanki Srirama Murthy as Rajaraja Narendra. It is based on the epic of the same name by Gurajada Apparao. The movie was a runaway hit, and in the aftermath of its success Pullayya married Santha Kumari.

== Cast ==
- Banda Kanakalingeswara Rao as Sarangadhara
- Santha Kumari as Chitrangi
- Sriranjani as Kanakangi
- Addanki Srirama Murthy as King Narendra
- Kannamba as Queen Ratnangi
- Pulipati Venkateswarlu
