= Kanyasulkam (disambiguation) =

Kanyasulkam or Kanyashulka may refer to:

- Kanyasulka, bride price in Sanskrit
- Kanyasulkam, a famous 1892 play in Telugu by Indian writer Gurajada Apparao
- Kanyasulkam (film), a 1955 Indian film based on the play
