= Kanyasulkam (film) =

Kanyasulkamu
- Theatrical release poster
- Directed by: P. Pullayya
- Screenplay by: Vempati Sadasivabrahmam
- Based on: Kanyasulkam by Gurajada Apparao
- Produced by: D. L. Narayana
- Starring: N. T. Rama Rao; Savitri; Sowcar Janaki
- Cinematography: N. Prakash
- Edited by: R. Hanumantha Rao
- Music by: Ghantasala
- Production company: Vinodha Pictures
- Release date: 26 August 1955
- Running time: 167 minutes
- Country: India
- Language: Telugu

Kanyasulkamu (transl. Price for the Bride) is a 1955 Indian Telugu-language philosophical film directed by P. Pullayya and produced by D. L. Narayana for his production company Vinodha Pictures. The film stars N. T. Rama Rao, Savitri and Sowcar Janaki, with soundtrack and score by Ghantasala. This film marks the screen debut of actress Saradha, who made a cameo appearance for a three-minute song sequence as a child artist.

Written by Vempati Sadasivabrahmam, Kanyasulkamu is based on a play of the same name by Gurajada Apparao, and is set during the pre-Independence era in the Vizianagaram area of the Madras Presidency of British India. The film focuses on a group of Brahmin men and their attempts to earn easy money by conning the women around them, including a young widow and a nine-year-old bride.

Principal photography was conducted in sets erected at Narasu, Revathi and Venus Cine Studios in Kodambakkam, Madras (now Chennai). The post-production activities were completed at Vijaya Laboratory in Madras. Kanyasulkamu was released theatrically on 26 August 1955 and opened to negative reviews from both the critics and the audience, who criticized the changes made to the play while adapting it to film. During its later re-release in 1983, 1986 and 1993 limited across Andhra Pradesh, Kanyasulkamu completed a 100-day run every time, making it the only Indian film to do so.

== Plot ==
The film is set during the pre-Independence era in the Vizianagaram area of the Madras Presidency of British India.

== Cast ==
- N. T. Rama Rao as Gireesam
- Savitri as Madhuravani
- Sowcar Janaki as Buchamma
- C. S. R. Anjaneyulu as Ramappa Pantulu
- Govindarajula Subba Rao as Lubdhavadhanlu
- Gummadi as Sowjanya Rao
- Vinnakota Ramanna Panthulu as Agnihotravadhanlu
- Vangara Venkata Subbaiah as Karataka Sastri
- Suryakantham as Meenakshi
- Chaya Devi as Putakoollamma
- Hemalatha as Venkamma
- Chadalavada Kutumba Rao as Polishetty
- Master Sudhakar as Mahesam
- Master Kundu as Venkatesam
- Baby Subhadra as Subbi
- Peketi Sivaram as Police Constable (cameo appearance)
- Sharada in a cameo appearance for the song "Bommala Pelli"

== Production ==
During the production of Devadasu (1953), producer D. L. Narayana approached N. T. Rama Rao for playing the titular role. Rama Rao could not accept the proposal due to scheduling conflicts, and Akkineni Nageswara Rao was cast for the same. However, Narayana was adamant to make a film with Rama Rao, and chose to adapt Gurajada Apparao's play Kanyasulkamu. Due to the play's popularity, Narayana asked writer Vempati Sadasivabrahmam to make changes to the narrative and plot points from the play, with a view to avoid predictability.

Narayana produced the film for his production company Vinodha Pictures, and signed P. Pullayya to direct it. R. Hanumantha Rao, who was the film's assistant director, also served as the editor. Sadasivabrahmam also worked on the screenplay and dialogue apart from adapting the play into a script. He also adapted the poem "Poornamma", which is a part of Apparao's poetry compilation Mutyala Saralu, into one of the subplots to ease the audience into the milieu. N. Prakash served as the cinematographer assisted by Jaihind Satyam and R. N. Nagaraja Rao.

Rama Rao played Gireesam, the anti-heroic protagonist of the play whose character arc was altered in the end as part of the scripting changes. Savitri was cast as Madhuravani, a prostitute and the other protagonist of the play. Narayana approached Jamuna to play Buchamma, but her father opposed this idea unwilling to see her act as a young widow on screen. Sowcar Janaki was later cast for the same. C. S. R. Anjaneyulu, Govindarajula Subba Rao, Vinnakota Ramanna Panthulu and Gummadi were cast in other supporting roles. Peketi Sivaram and Sharada made cameo appearances in the film.

Pasumarthi Krishnamurthy choreographed the dance sequences. Godagankar and Vali were signed as the art directors, and were aided by Haribabu and K. Nageswara Rao in the production design. Sets were erected at Narasu, Revathi and Venus Cine Studios in Kodambakkam, Madras (now Chennai) where majority of the principal photography was wrapped up. The post production activities were completed at Vijaya Laboratory Film Centre Pvt. Ltd. in Madras.

== Music ==
Kanyasulkam

Soundtrack album by Ghantasala
- Released: 1 January 1955
- Recorded: 1954–1955
- Studio: Vijaya Vauhini Studios
- Genre: Soundtrack
- Length: 30:58
- Label: His Master's Voice
- Producer: Ghantasala

Ghantasala chronology
Vadina Gari Gajulu (1955)	Kanyasulkam (1955)	Sonta Ooru (1956)

Ghantasala composed the film's soundtrack and score. K. Ramachandran, T. S. Ranga Saamy, N. Seshadri and Suryanarayana worked on the sound design and audiography. Apart from songs with lyrics written by Devulapalli Krishnasastri, Malladi Venkata Krishna Murthy, Samudrala Sr., and Sadasivabrahmam exclusively for the film, Narayana and Pullaiah decided to use Sri Sri's "Anandam Aarnavamaithe" and Basavaraju Apparao's "Nagula Chavithi" were utilised in the soundtrack. The soundtrack, marketed by His Master's Voice, was released on 1 January 1955.

Tracklist
No.	Title	Lyrics	Singer(s)	Length
1.	"Sarasuda Daricherara"	Vempati Sadasivabrahmam	P. Susheela	3:17
2.	"Bommala Pelli"	Devulapalli Krishnasastri	Padmapriya	2:51
3.	"Nagula Chavithi"	Basavaraju Apparao	N. L. Ganasaraswathi	2:56
4.	"Chitaru Kommaku Mithai Potlam"	Malladi Ramakrishna Sastry	Ghantasala	3:11
5.	"Anandam Aarnavamaithe"	Sri Sri	P. Susheela	4:02
6.	"Poornamma Katha"	Gurajada Apparao	Ghantasala	9:45
7.	"Illu Illanievu"	Gurajada Apparao	N. L. Ganasaraswathi	2:05
8.	"Keechaka Vadha"	Samudrala Sr.	Madhavapeddi Satyam, N. L. Ganasaraswathi	2:51
Total length:				30:58

== Release and reception ==
Kanyasulkamu was released theatrically on 26 August 1955 and opened to negative reviews from both the critics and the audience, particularly from those who admired the play. The word of mouth was influenced heavily by those who felt that the redemption of Gireesam at the end was a major undoing to Apparao's vision. In his review for the Zamin Ryot magazine dated 2 September 1955, Anantha Padmanabha Rao criticised the film's writing and the performances of Rama Rao and Janaki. However, he praised Savitri's performance calling it "commendable". The film managed to complete a 56-day run with average returns until the release of Rama Rao's Jayasimha, whose commercial success shadowed Kanyasulkamu completely. Kanyasulkamu was later re-released in 1983, 1986 and 1993 limitedly across Andhra Pradesh and completed a 100-day run every time, making it the only Indian film to do so.
