= Prana Mithrulu =

- Theatrical release poster
- Directed by: P. Pullaiah
- Screenplay by: P. Pullaiah
- Story by: Mullapudi Venkata Ramana
- Produced by: V. Venkateswarlu
- Starring: Akkineni Nageswara Rao; Savitri; Jaggayya
- Cinematography: P. S. Selvaraj
- Edited by: N. M. Shankar
- Music by: K. V. Mahadevan
- Production company: Padmasri Pictures
- Release date: 5 May 1967
- Running time: 160 minutes
- Country: India
- Language: Telugu

Prana Mithrulu (transl. Close friends) is a 1967 Indian Telugu-language drama film, produced by V. Venkateswarlu under the Padmasri Pictures banner and directed by P. Pullaiah. It stars Akkineni Nageswara Rao, Savitri and Jaggayya, with music composed by K. V. Mahadevan. The film's factory label subplot was inspired by Becket (1964).

== Plot ==
The film begins with Zamindar Chinna Babu Gopala Krishna, a proprietor of a shipping company who always enjoys life in the frolic. Chinnaiah / Chinna, an orphan and a true blue, was raised along with Babu. They share a bond that is more akin to brothers than casual friends, and it is acknowledged by Babu's mother, Jagadamba, who treats them equally. Once, Chinna and Babu tease Parvati, a school teacher, and she slaps Chinna. Thereafter, they fall in love. Diwanji, who looks after Babu's business affairs, wants to grab the property. He tries to cheat and manipulate Babu in many ways, but at every step, Chinna stands as a barrier between them. Diwanji gets fed up with Chinna's behavior and humiliates him as a servant. Angered, Babu entrusts his entire authority. Diwanji cannot tolerate it, so he uses innocence and pretends to resign from the job. Here, Jagadamba feels it's good for everyone to separate Chinna & Babu. She offers Chinna a vast amount and asks him to leave Babu so that Babu can take up his responsibilities. But Chinna throws it away and replies that he cannot live without Babu. Then Jagadamba pleads with him, and he gives her a word to do it. Knowing that Chinna is leaving Babu prays for him to not do so but Chinna does not stand, therefore, Babu keeps the oath on him not to move which makes Chinna a statue. At that moment, Jagadamba's diplomacy fails to bring them together.

Meanwhile, Babu humors and teases Chinna about Parvati and, in a bid to force him to accept love for Parvati, asks him to bring her to him for pleasure. He obliges and asks Parvati the same. Heartbroken, she confronts and gives herself to Babu, who sends her safely conscious of the situation. Plus, furious Parvati refuses ever to go back to Chinna. To clean his image and push Chinna to his senses, Babu marries Padmavati. Herein, via Chinna, she comprehends the complex character of Babu, and they form an excellent marital bond. Meanwhile, Parvati continues to wither away. Labor problems persist in the factory, and no one knows how to handle them. So, Babu sends Chinna as a trojan horse into the labor camp to prey upon the beliefs and vulnerabilities of the workforce. At that point, Chinna forges and establishes himself as a labor leader who intends to serve his master. Parvati discerns the drama and desperately tries to educate the labor masses against the plot. The naive belief of the laborers and their plights changes Chinna's heart. He confronts Babu and stands up as their leader in a true light. Parvati continues not to believe him and accuses him of will.

Subsequently, Babu cannot bear the rupture between him & Chinna and retrieves him, but in vain. Therein, Babu's ego flares, leading to his violent behavior. In one instance, he assaults a laborer, Simhalu. However, Chinna rescues him from the mob. Then, he tries to prove himself by asking Babu to apologize, but he refuses. In uncontrollable fury, Babu half-sanctions Chinna's murder. Diwan contrives to take these loose words into action. Knowing full well from Padma's help that his life is under threat, Chinna continues on a peaceful march for self-respect to Babu's house. This earns him back Parvati's respect. Ignoring her pleas of life being more important, he marches on. Chinna controls the mob at the house. Despite carrying his gun, Babu fails to shoot Chinna, but a counterplan by Diwan backfires as Appalu, who is Diwan's henchman, times wrong and fires at Chinna, who meets a heroic death. Babu realizes his mistakes, but it is too late. Sensing ominous signs, Parvathi, too, falls at the feet of the local deity and dies. The culprits are all arrested by the police. A statue of Chinna rises in front of the Zamindar Babu's building, and all the laborers pay tearful tribute to Chinna.

== Cast ==
- Akkineni Nageswara Rao as Chinnaiah
- Savitri as Parvathi
- Jaggayya as Chinna Babu Gopala Krishna
- Gummadi as Diwanji
- Relangi as Simhalu
- Allu Ramalingaiah as Seshayya
- Chadalavada as Appalu
- Dr. Sivaramakrishnaiah as Nandesam Seth
- A. V. Subba Rao as Raja Visweswara Rao
- Raavi Kondala Rao as Pichaiah
- Jagga Rao as Kondaiah
- Santha Kumari as Jagadamba
- Kanchana as Padmavathi
- Girija as Lachamma
- Geetanjali as Kalavar Rani
- Sukanya as item number

== Soundtrack ==
Music composed by K. V. Mahadevan.

Song title	Lyrics	Singers	length
"Kala Kala Navve"	Dasaradhi	Ghantasala, P. Susheela	3:19
"Gunde Jhallu"	Acharya Aatreya	P. Susheela	3:33
"Pilupu Vinu"	Dasaradhi	P. Susheela	3:37
"Thellavarenu Kodi Koosenu"	C. Narayana Reddy	Ghantasala	3:26
"Manasu Mamatha"	C. Narayana Reddy	Ghantasala, P. Susheela, Prayaga	2:49
