= Kalaivaanan =

- Film poster
- Directed by: P. Pullayya
- Written by: Acharya Aatreya
- Produced by: Vasireddy Narayana Rao
- Starring: A. Nageswara Rao; Anjali Devi
- Cinematography: P. L. Roy
- Edited by: R. Devarajan
- Music by: Pendyala
- Production company: Sarada Productions
- Release date: 9 April 1959
- Running time: 171 minutes
- Country: India
- Language: Tamil

Kalaivaanan is 1959 Indian Tamil-language biographical film, based on the life of Karnataka poet Kaasinath, produced by Vasireddy Narayana Rao and directed by P. Pullayya. It stars A. Nageswara Rao and Anjali Devi, with music composed by Pendyala Nageswara Rao. The film was simultaneously made in Telugu as Jayabheri.

== Plot ==
The film begins 1600–1700 during the Vijayanagara empire at a place called Vidyanagaram, the hometown of high scholars & elite communities where Kasinatha Sastry (Akkineni Nageswara Rao) an orthodox brahmin brought up by his elder brother Viswanatha Sastry & sister-in-law Annapurna. Once a low caste Bhagavatar's called Bhachanollu visits Vidyanagaram in which an extraordinary dancer Manjulavani challenges the people of Vidyanagaram when Kasi competes and wins. Knowing it, Viswambhara Sastry the mentor of Kasi chides him that he has dragged Goddess Saraswati into the streets. Here, Kasi argues that art does not have any caste or community it should hold the public admiration when Viswambhara Sastry becomes furious and necks Kasi out. Being cognizant of it, Viswanatha Sastry berates and forcibly makes Kasi to apologise the mentor. Thereafter, Kasi & Manju fall for each other and gives a show ignoring the ordinance of village heads & his elders for which he has been ostracised from the religion. Soon, Kasi marries Manju and beloved by the public all over the country with their performances. At that juncture, King Vijayananda Ramagajapati impressed and invites them to his kingdom where Dharmadhikari narrates the story of Kasi. Affirms, Kasi is ineligible for the honour when Kasi strives and gains victory over all the scholars in the council when he is accoladed. Even Viswambhara Sastry too appreciates him. Keeping that grudge in mind Dharmadhikari ploys using court dancer Amurthamba who clutches him into a spoiled brat. Once, drunken Kasi unable to sing in the court, so, King makes his prison when Manju arrives on time and breaks the conspiracy of Dharmadhikari. Later Kasi & Manju returns to Vidyanagaram, but Kasi cannot get rid off his vices, loses his wealth and start ill-treating Manju. Learning it, Annapurna reaches Kasi secretly, upbraids which makes him repent and reform. On her back, Viswanatha Sastry does not allow her, so, she commits suicide when Kasi & Manju gets back her with their devotional power. At last, the entire society realises the couple's eminence and pleads guilty. Finally, the movie ends a happy note.

== Cast ==
Male cast

- A. Nageswara Rao as Kashinath
- K. A. Thangavelu as Hari
- S. V. Sahasranamam as Viswanathan
- S. V. Ranga Rao as King
- V. Nagayya as Ekambavanar
- K. Sarangapani as Sivan
- P. S. Venkatachalam as Dharmadhikari
- K. Natarajan as Shambu Shastri
- V. M. Ezhumalai as Mari

Female cast

- Anjali Devi as Mala
- Santha Kumari as Parvati
- Rajasulochana as Amirtham
- T. P. Muthulakshmi as Rathnam
- C. T. Rajakantham as Ranganayagi

Male support cast

- Sethuraman, Kittan, Rama Rao, Krishnamoorthi
  Nagarathnam, Raja, and Swami.

== Soundtrack ==
The music was composed by Pendyala.

Song	Singers	Lyrics	Length (m:ss)
"Aayakalaigal Arupathu Nankinaiyum"	Thiruchi Loganathan	Amibapathi Kovai	00:41
"Kalai Saradha Devi En Thaye"	Ghantasala, P. B. Sreenivas, Panigrahi	Ramaiah Das	04:25
"Irukkirara Ingirukkirara Enai"	P. Susheela	Ramaiah Das	04:11
"Saval Savalendru"	T. M. Soundararajan & Jikki	Pattukkottai Kalyanasundaram	08:02
"Aadum Mayil Nee Vaa"	Ghantasala	Kambadasan	04:45
"Varaye Nanda Murali"	Ghantasala & P. Susheela	A. Maruthakasi	04:37
"En Kannil Ambum Undu"	Seerkazhi Govindarajan, P. Susheela	A. Maruthakasi	03:43
"Vennaiyai Thirudithindru"	S. C. Krishnan & Janaki	Pazhanichami	04:24
"Sikkadha Meenum Vandhu Sikkavenum"	T. M. Soundararajan, Thiruchi Loganathan & P. Susheela	A. Maruthakasi	07:08
"Alumarase Unatharul Vizhipparvai"	Seerkazhi Govindarajan	A. Maruthakasi	06:12
"Kadhal Silai Aadudhe"	M. L. Vasanthakumari	Thanjai Ramaiah Das	04:47
"Anandavan Bhaitappile Athiyile"	T. M. Soundararajan	A. Maruthakasi	06:47
"Dheivam Nee Dhana Dharmam Nee Dhana"	T. M. Soundararajan & P. Susheela	A. Maruthakasi	02:15
