= Thalla? Pellama? =

Indial Telugu-language drama film

- Theatrical release poster
- Directed by: N. T. Rama Rao
- Written by: N. T. Rama Rao
- Produced by: N. T. Rama Rao
- Starring: N. T. Rama Rao; Chandrakala; Master Harikrishna
- Cinematography: J. Satyanarayana
- Edited by: G. D. Joshi
- Music by: T. V. Raju
- Production companies: NAT & Ramakrishna Cine Studios
- Release date: 8 January 1970
- Running time: 181 minutes
- Country: India
- Language: Telugu

Thalla? Pellama? (transl. Mother? Wife?) is a 1970 Indian Telugu-language drama film written and directed by N. T. Rama Rao. It stars N. T. Rama Rao, Chandrakala, and Master Harikrishna, with music composed by T. V. Raju. It was produced by N. Trivikrama Rao under the NAT and Ramakrishna Cine Studios banners. The film was remade in Hindi as Bidaai (1974), and in Tamil as Piriya Vidai (1975).

== Cast ==
- N. T. Rama Rao as Sudhakar
- Chandrakala as Padma
- Master Harikrishna as Krishna
- V. Nagayya
- Relangi as Rao Bahadoor Nambitonda
- Ramana Reddy
- Nagabhushanam as Prabhakar
- Satyanarayana
- Prabhakar Reddy
- Mukkamala
- Tyagaraju
- Raavi Kondala Rao
- K. V. Chalam
- Sarathi
- Arja Janardana Rao
- Jagga Rao
- Devika
- Santha Kumari as Ramanamma
- Chaya Devi
- Lakshmi Kanthamma
- Vijaya Lalitha as item number
- Jyothi Lakshmi as item number

== Soundtrack ==
Music was composed by T. V. Raju.

S. No.	Song title	Lyrics	Singers	length
1	"Telugu Jaathi Manadi"	C. Narayana Reddy	Ghantasala	4:27
2	"O Bangaru Gutiloni"	C. Narayana Reddy	Ghantasala, P. Susheela	3:33
3	"Thaagithe Thappemundee"	C. Narayana Reddy	Ghantasala	5:30
4	"Brahmam Thaatha"	Kosaraju	P. Susheela	5:48
5	"Nuvvu Navvu Thunnavu"	C. Narayana Reddy	Mohammed Rafi, S. Janaki	9:27
6	"Kaalam Ee Kaalam"	C. Narayana Reddy	L. R. Eswari	3:20
7	"Krishnaiah Krishnaiah"	C. Narayana Reddy	Santha Kumari	5:56
