= Dharma Patni =

- Theatrical release poster
- Directed by: P. Pullayya
- Written by: Chakrapani (dialogues)
- Screenplay by: P. Pullayya
- Story by: V. S. Khandekar
- Produced by: P. Pullayya; Santha Kumari (presents)
- Starring: Santha Kumari; Bhanumathi; Uppuluri Hanumantha Rao; C. Hemalatha
- Cinematography: S. K. Pai
- Edited by: Baburao Barodkar
- Music by: Timir Baran; Annasaheb Mainkar
- Production company: Famous Films
- Release date: 1941
- Running time: 170 minutes
- Country: India
- Language: Telugu

Dharma Patni or Dharmapatni (transl. Wife) is a 1941 Indian Telugu-language drama film produced and directed by P. Pullayya under the Famous Films banner. It stars Santha Kumari, Bhanumathi, Uppuluri Hanumantha Rao and C. Hemalatha. The film marks the debut of Akkineni Nageswara Rao, who played a minor role as one of the ten school children in a song sequence, and also that of the writer Chakrapani.

The film was shot at Shalini Cinetone Studios, Kolhapur. Most of the technicians including cinematographer S. K. Pai, music director Annasaheb Mainkar, art director H. S. Gang Naik and editor Baburao Barodkar were from Maharashtra. The film was a commercial success.

== Cast ==
- Bhanumathi as Uma
- Santha Kumari as Radha
- Uppaluri Hanumantha Rao as Mohan
- C. Hemalatha
- Rallabandi Kutumba Rao as Ananda Rao
- K. Lakshmi Narasimha Rao
- Achari
- Adinarayanayya as Mohan's father
- Peddapuram Raju as Sridevi
- Chalapathi Rao
- Narimani
- Susheela
- Master Kumar as Child Mohan
- Baby Lakshmi as Child Radha
- Akkineni Nageswara Rao

== Production ==
=== Development ===
When P. Pullayya decided to make his first drama film, his friends from the Marathi film industry and his partner at Famous Films, Shiraz Ali suggested the works of popular Marathi writer Vishnu Sakharam Khandekar. Pullayya picked up Dharmapathni from Khandekar's stories and wrote a scenario.

=== Cast and crew ===
Pullayya took his wife Santhakumari for the title role and after watching Vara Vikrayam (1939), he felt that Bhanumathi suited for the second heroine Uma's character, as Uma was as assertive and modern thinking like Bhanumathi’s character from Vara Vikrayam. For the male lead, Hanumantha Rao, son of popular stage actor Uppuluri Sanjeeva Rao was signed. He later acted two more movies, Bheeshma Pratigna and Vandemataram before settling down as a Municipal Health Officer in Bhimavaram. Dharmapathni also marked the debut of one of Telugu cinema's later day doyen Akkineni Nageswara Rao in a small role. Nageswara Rao's brother Ramabrahmam took him to Kolhapur hoping he would get the male lead's childhood character. Since Nageswara Rao was too old for the role, Pullayya signed him as one of the ten school children for the song sequence "Anandamayega mana Mohanudu".

Viswanatha Satyanarayana was initially signed to write the dialogues. But since they were too grammatical, Chakrapani, then already popular for his Telugu translations of Bengali writer Sarat Chandra Chatterjee's works, was hired. Most of the technicians were from Maharashtra — cinematographer S. K. Pai, music director Annasaheb Mainkar, art director H. S. Gang Naik and editor Baburao Barodkar.

=== Filming ===
The film was shot at Shalini Cinetone Studios, Kolhapur.

== Songs ==
Music was composed by Annasaheb Mainkar. Lyrics were written by Daita Gopalam.

- "Anuraagam Leka Anandamunda" (Lyrics: Daita Gopalam; Singer: P. Bhanumathi)
- "Nilu Niluma Neelavarnaa" (Lyrics: Balijepalli Lakshmikantham; Singer: P. Bhanumathi)
