= Kanyasulkam =

1892 Telugu-language play

- Original language: Telugu
- Written by: Gurajada Apparao
- Characters: Agnihotravadhanlu; Karataka Sastri; Sishyudu; Lubdhavadhanlu; Meenakshi; Gireesam
- Setting: Vizianagaram, 19th century

Premiere
- Date: 1892

Kanyasulkam is a Telugu play written by Gurajada Apparao in 1892. It is one of the earliest modern works in an Indian language, and it is the first Telugu play to deal with social issues.

The play portrays the practice of Kanya-sulkam (roughly translates to bride price) which was common among the priestly Brahmins in Telugu-speaking areas of southern India. Controversial in its time, this play continues to be one of the most popular Telugu literary works of all time. A number of expressions used by Gurajada in this play are still popular in modern-day Telugu.

== Objective ==
Gurajada wrote this play to raise awareness about what he felt was a scandalous state of affairs in society. His English preface to the first edition states: "Such a scandalous state of things is a disgrace to society, and literature can not have a higher function than to show up such practices and give currency to a high standard of moral ideas. Until reading habits prevail among masses, one must look only to the stage to exert such healthy influence." Traditionally, Telugu literary works were written in a highly stylistic language with complicated words and meter; these works could only be understood by the educated elite. Gurajada's mission was to reach out to the masses, so he broke with tradition (he called the literary dialect "doubly dead" in his preface) and wrote in the vibrant and colorful spoken language of the day.

== Background ==
Kanyasulkam drama has 2 versions, both written by Gurajada Apparao 15 years apart. The 2nd version of Kanyasulkam was published in 1909.

== Setting ==
The play is set in the Vizianagaram (Vijayanagaram) princely state in British India. It deals primarily with the lives of the "upper caste" Brahmins of the area, although it offers a few insights into the lives of other people as well. The play centers on Gireesam, an English-educated, resourceful but unscrupulous Vaidiki Brahmin man, and Madhura vani, a prostitute who takes her morals seriously. Although it maintains a surface of humor through satire, the play conveys the "disgrace to society" that outraged Gurajada.

== Main characters ==
- Agnihotravadhanlu, Krishnarayapuram agrahareekudu
- Venkamma, Wife of Agnihotravadhanlu
- Bucchamma, Elder daughter of Agnihotravadhanlu
- Subbamma, Younger daughter of Agnihotravadhanlu
- Venkatesam, Son of Agnihotravadhanlu
- Karataka Sastri, Brother-in-law of Agnihotravadhanlu
- Sishyudu a.k.a. '"Mahesam"', Disciple of Karataka Sastri
- Lubdhavadhanlu, Ramachandrapuram agrahareekudu
- Meenakshi, Widowed daughter of Lubdhavadhanlu
- Ramappantulu, Karanam of Ramachandrapuram agraharam and Brother-in-law of Lubdhavadhanulu
- Gireesam, cousin of Lubdhavadhanlu
- Saujanyaravu pantulu, Vakeel
- Bheemaravu pantulu, Vakeel
- Nayudu, Private vakeel
- Poojari Gavarayya, Mantrikudu and vaidyudu
- Madhuravani, Prostitute
- "'Siddanthi"' Friend of Ramappa Pantulu
- "'Panta Siddanthi"'

== Characters ==
Madhuravani, the muse of Girisam during the beginning of the play, and that of Ramappa Panthulu in the rest of the play, is portrayed as a very righteous, wise, magnanimous and able woman who is willing to even bend over backwards to help someone in need. This way the play sought to take on the prejudices and practices of contemporary Indian society head-on. The play includes a few gut-wrenching scenes such as one where Agnihothravadhanulu, an egoistic, male-chauvinistic Brahmin and a key player in the play, barbarically slams his food plate onto the face of his young, widowed daughter, when she requests that he reconsider his decision to marry his pre-pubescent daughter to an old man. The practice of parents arranging the marriages of their pre-pubescent daughters to old men for cash was very prevalent during those days, and was referred to popularly as Kanyasulkam, literally meaning "money in lieu for a girl", which also forms the title of the play.

The play also depicts, amusingly, the practices of orthodox Brahmins, such as Madi, with a particular character in the play even shrivelling away from everyone and everything like a touch-me-not, lest he might lose his sanctity. (He even has to perform some "religious cleansing" for the things someone touched before he can touch them.)

The play also has numerous lighter moments, notably regarding the marriage of the stingy old man, Lubdhavadhanulu. Much of that comedy occurs as dialogue between Girisam and his various love interests, and also during the marriage of Lubdhavadhanulu to a boy disguised as a girl. Contemporary Indian society is depicted in a very real fashion, without glorifying it so that it has the effect of being 'in-your-face'. Numerous interesting characters spring up during various points of the play, such as the widowed owner of a local food court, referred to as Pootakoolla 'Munda' (the word in quotes being an offensive word for a widow, originating from 'Mundan', meaning shaving, in Sanskrit and Telugu, because during that period, a woman had to shave her hair off after her husband's death), the debauched and widowed daughter of Lubdhavadhanulu, Meenakshi, and the son of Lubdhavadhanulu. They are very much similar in their notions and prejudices to the people one may see in any Indian village even today.

In Girisam, we can see that kind of a young man who is opportunistic, yearns for momentary pleasures, desires easy money and is unwilling to work, for the simple reason that he is too fickle-minded to hold any particular job for a considerable amount of time. He is so unwilling, in fact, that he wouldn't think twice about taking the easiest path to fulfilling his desires, even if he is trampling upon someone else's life while he is on his way. He claims to be a progressive, but claiming is all he does. In Meenakshi, we may see a woman who might have been widowed even before she hit puberty. She was therefore paying for a mistake that was anyone's but hers and was being accused of being unfaithful to a husband she did not have. Ramappa Panthulu is a middle man and very incompetent one at that. He tries to twist and turn every situation in his favor, but ends up being entangled in the very mess he himself created in the first place. He is a victim of his own making. Probably, Madhuravani and PootaKoolla 'Munda' are the only characters who have strong moral footing and maintain their stand throughout the play. There are no surprises, shocks, or suspense regarding the characters of the persons and flaws in their characters, if any, are laid out clearly by the playwright.

== In popular culture ==
The play was adapted into Telugu cinema as Kanyasulkam with an ensemble cast including N. T. Rama Rao, Savitri, C.S.R. Anjaneyulu, Vinnakota Ramanna Panthulu, Govindarajula Subba Rao, Gummadi, Suryakantham, Chaya Devi and Hemalatha, under the direction of P. Pullaiah.
