= Jayabheri =

- Theatrical release poster
- Directed by: P. Pullayya
- Screenplay by: P. Pullayya
- Story by: Acharya Aatreya
- Produced by: Vasireddy Narayana Rao
- Starring: Akkineni Nageswara Rao; Anjali Devi
- Cinematography: P. L. Roy
- Edited by: R. Devarajan
- Music by: Pendyala Nageswara Rao
- Production company: Sarada Productions
- Distributed by: Navayuga Films
- Release date: 9 April 1959
- Running time: 110 minutes
- Country: India
- Language: Telugu

Jayabheri (transl. The Clarion of Victory) is a 1959 Indian Telugu-language film directed by P. Pullayya who co-wrote the script with Acharya Aatreya. The film is based on the life of poet Kasinath and stars Akkineni Nageswara Rao and Anjali Devi. The film was produced by Vasireddy Narayana Rao with music composed by Pendyala Nageswara Rao.

Jayabheri won the Certificate of Merit for Best Feature Film in Telugu at the 7th National Film Awards. The music from the film was widely played on the radio. The film was simultaneously released in Tamil as Kalaivaanan.

== Plot ==
The story happens in 1600 or 1700, at Vidyanagaram. It is the hometown of respected scholars where Kasinatha Sastry, an orthodox Brahmin, is raised by his elder brother Viswanatha Sastry and sister-in-law Annapurna.

Once lower strata, Bhagavathar's Bhachanollu visits when extraordinary dancer Manjulavani challenges them on whom Kasi wins. Knowing it, Vishwambhara Sastry, his mentor, admonishes that he has dragged Saraswati on the streets. Here, Kasi argues that art has no barrier; it is only public admiration. Ergo, Vishwambhara Sastry necks Kasi out, but Viswanatha Sastry berates and forcibly makes him apologize.

After that, Kasi & Manju perform a show, ignoring the ordinance of arbiters, and they ostracize him from the religion. Soon, Kasi knits Manju and conducts consorts nationwide, gaining high public appraisal. Emperor Vijayananda Rama Gajapati was impressed and invited them to his court, where Dharmadhikari denounced Kasi because of his ill reputation. Kasi triumphs over all the scholars in the council when he is highly honored and acquires appreciation for Vishwambhara Sastry, too.

Hence, the begrudged Dharmadhikari is in cahoots with courtesan Amruthamba, who converts him into contention. Once, drunken Kasi cannot sing in the court, so he gets arrested when Manju arrives and breaks the conspiracy. Later, Kasi & Manju return to their hometown, but Kasi cannot quit his vices, loses his wealth, and pesters Manju. Learning it, Annapurna covetously approaches him with upbraids, which makes him repent and reform. On her back, Viswanatha Sastry expels her, so she commits suicide when Kasi & Manju retrieve her with their idolization. At last, society realizes the couple's eminence and pleads guilty. Finally, the movie ends happily.

== Cast ==
- Akkineni Nageswara Rao as Kasinatha Sastry
- Anjali Devi as Manjulavani
- Santha Kumari as Annapoorna
- Rajasulochana as Amrutha
- Relangi as Bangarayya
- S. V. Ranga Rao as Raja Vijayananda Rama Gajapati
- Gummadi as Viswanatha Sastry
- V. Nagayya as Viswambhara Sastry
- Ramana Reddy as Narayya
- Suryakantham as Ratnam
- Mukkamala as Dharmadhikari
- Maddali Krishnamurthy
- Peketi Sivaram as Sanjeevi
- Chadalavada as Raghavulu
- Surabhi Kamalabai as Ranganayaki

== Soundtrack ==
Soundtrack was composed by Pendyala Nageswara Rao. The song "Rasika Raja" is based on Kambhoji raga.

Jayabheri

Film score by Pendyala Nageswara Rao
- Released: 1959
- Venue: India
- Genre: Soundtrack
- Length: 64:09
- Producer: Pendyala Nageswara Rao

S. No.	Song title	Lyrics	Singers	length
1	"Suklaam Brahma"	Slokam	M. Balamuralikrishna	1:24
2	"Madi Saradadevi"	Malladi Ramakrishna Sastry	Ghantasala, P. B. Srinivas, Raghunath Panigrahi	4:28
3	"Hoy Vallo Padalira"	Arudra	Ghantasala, P. Susheela, Madhavapeddi Satyam	7:10
4	"Nanduni Charithamu"	Arudra	Ghantasala	4:07
5	"Adhikulani Athamulani"	Sri Sri	Ghantasala	3:58
6	"Needana Nannadhira"	Malladi Ramakrishna Sastry	Ghantasala	2:07
7	"Nee Ventha Nerajana"	Malladi Ramakrishna Sastry	M. L. Vasanthakumari	4:21
8	"Raagamayi Raave"	Malladi Ramakrishna Sastry	Ghantasala	4:42
9	"Ravoyi Raasavihaari"	Arudra	Ghantasala, P. Susheela	4:30
10	"Rasika Raaja"	Malladi Ramakrishna Sastry	Ghantasala	6:00
11	"Sangeeta Saahityame"	Malladi Ramakrishna Sastry	Ghantasala, P. Susheela	3:12
12	"Yamuna Teramunaa"	Malladi Ramakrishna Sastry	Ghantasala, P. Susheela	4:50
13	"Daivam Neevena"	Narapareddi	TM Soundararajan, P. Susheela	1:55
14	"Unnaaraa Jodunnaaraa"	Kosaraju	P. Susheela, Ghantasala, Madhavapeddi Satyam, Pithapuram	11:25

== Awards ==
National Film Awards

- 1959: Certificate of Merit for Best Feature Film in Telugu

Filmfare Awards South

- Filmfare Award for Best Film – Telugu
