= Annayya (1993 film) =

- VCD cover
- Directed by: D. Rajendra Babu
- Story by: K. Bhagyaraj
- Based on: Enga Chinna Rasa by K. Bhagyaraj
- Starring: Ravichandran; Madhoo; Aruna Irani
- Music by: Hamsalekha
- Release date: 22 March 1993
- Country: India
- Language: Kannada

Annayya (transl. Elder brother) is a 1993 Indian Kannada-language drama film directed by D. Rajendra Babu. It is a remake of K. Bhagyaraj's 1987 Tamil film Enga Chinna Rasa, whose story was inspired by the Kannada novel Ardhaangi by B. Puttaswamayya which had already been adapted in Kannada in 1969 as Mallammana Pavaada. The film features V. Ravichandran playing the title character along with Madhoo, Aruna Irani, Dheerendra Gopal and Srinath in other prominent roles. The music was composed by Hamsalekha. The film was produced by M. Chandrashekar. The film revolves around a battle of wits between a mother-in-law and her daughter-in-law.

== Plot ==
Annayya is a story of a person named "Annayya" (Ravichandran), who is the son of a rich landlord (Srinath) and had lost his mother at the time of his birth. Annayya's father can provide him anything he wants, but Annayyas' only desire is to get a mother's love. In order to fulfill his son's desire, Srinath marries Nagamani (Aruna Irani), thinking that she could take care of him more than his real mother would. As the days pass, Nagamani's brother Dheerendra Gopal enters into Annayya's house by convincing Srinath that he has lost all his properties due to some loss. Then Dheerendra Gopal asks his sister Nagamani to get the property of Annayya transferred into her name for the sake of her child, which is about to be born. Then Nagamani makes Annayya follow each and every step that his step-mother says and not to take even a single decision without her permission. He even stops going to school and becomes a slave to his mother.

As the time passes, Annayya grows up and marries Saraswati (Madhoo). Saraswati discovers that Nagamani's motherly love is fake and all that Nagamani wants is to capture Annayya's wealth. Then the battle begins within the household between daughter-in-law and mother-in-law which involves Saraswati trying to outdo Nagamani. This involves Saraswati voicing her concerns to Annayya about his mother, resulting in Saraswati being slapped once by her husband, and alienating him. This humiliation does not worry Saraswati, who eventually wins the battle once Nagamani realizes the importance of loving her stepson back as much as he loves her.

== Cast ==
- Ravichandran as Annayya
  - Guruprasad MG as Young Annayya
- Madhoo as Saraswati
- Aruna Irani as Nagamani, Annayya's step-mother
- Srinath as Manjunathayya, Annayya's father
- Dheerendra Gopal as Nagamani's brother
- Sanketh Kashi as Kariya
- Indudhar as Dheerendra Gopal's son
- Ashalatha
- Latha
- Shanthamma
- Bank Suresh
- M.S. Karanth
- Rajanand
- Lakshman Rao

== Production ==
Aruna Irani reprised her role from the Hindi remake Beta.

== Soundtrack ==
The music composed by Hamsalekha was well received and the audio sales hit a record high.

Title	Singer(s)
"Annayya Annayya"	S. Janaki
"Ammayya Ammayya"	S. P. Balasubrahmanyam
"Bombe Bombe"	S. Janaki, S. P. Balasubramanyam
"Ahaa Ohoo"	S. P. Balasubrahmanyam, K. S. Chithra
"Come on Darling Ayyo Ayyo"	S. P. Balasubrahmanyam, K. S. Chithra
"Ragi Holadage Khali"	S. P. Balasubrahmanyam, K. S. Chithra
