= Bhaktha Jana =

- Poster
- Directed by: P. Pullaiah
- Written by: Ayyalu Somayajulu (dialogues)
- Produced by: P. Pullaiah
- Starring: C. Honnappa Bhagavathar; V. Nagayya; Santha Kumari; K. Sarangapani; B. R. Panthulu
- Cinematography: Sadhu. N. Nayak
- Edited by: Shankar
- Music by: Reema–Narayanan; B. Narasimha Rao
- Production company: Ragini Films
- Distributed by: Ragini Films
- Release date: 1948
- Country: India
- Language: Tamil

Bhaktha Jana (transl. Devotee Jana) is a 1948 Indian Tamil language film directed and produced by P. Pullaiah. The film featured C. Honnappa Bhagavathar, V. Nagayya and Santha Kumari with K. Sarangapani and B. R. Panthulu playing supporting roles.

== Plot ==
Janaka (Santhakumari) has been a staunch devotee of a Hindu deityPanduranga since her childhood. Her mother does not approve, as she feels such blind devotion will adversely affect her daughter's marriage prospects and her future. Frustrated by her mother's attitude, Jana leaves her home and is found by Panduranga (C. Honnappa Bhagavathar) in the guise of a hermit. He tells her to devote herself to Panduranga by worshipping him daily at his temple. Jana does do so accordingly, much to the discomfort and anger of another devotee, Panthoji (B. R. Panthulu). He doesn't like Janaka coming to the temple and offering worship to Panduranga and orders his disciples to throw her out. She is saved by Namadeva (V. Nagayya) who provides her asylum in his home. One night, the jewellery in the temple goes missing and is found with Janaka. Panthoji and his disciples accuse Jana of thievery. When they open Panduranga's shrine, they are shocked to see that the idol is missing. The next moment, they see the idol along with the jewellery in her hands. Panthoji realises that she has the blessings of Panduranga and apologises to her for his accusations.

== Cast ==
Adapted from Film News Anandan and The Hindu

- C. Honnappa Bhagavathar as Panduranga
- V. Nagayya as Namadeva
- Santha Kumari as Janaka
- K. Sarangapani
- B. R. Panthulu as Panthoji
- T. V. Kumudhini
- T. N. Meenakshi
- K. R. Chellam

Dance

- Lalitha as Kubja
- Padmini as Krishna

== Production ==
Bhaktha Jana continued the trend of devotional films made in South Indian cinema from the 1930s and 1940s. P. Pullaiah directed and produced the film under his own banner Ragini Films.

== Soundtrack ==
Reema–Narayanan and B. Narasimha Rao were in charge of the music and score for Bhaktha Jana while the songs' lyrics were written by Papanasam Sivan and Rajagopal Iyer.

== Reception ==
Film historian Randor Guy notes that Bhaktha Jana is "remembered for the emotional story and fine on-screen narration by P. Pullaiah, and impressive performances by Shanthakumari, Panthulu and [Nagayya]".
