= Koduku Kodalu =

- Theatrical release poster
- Directed by: P. Pullaiah
- Written by: Acharya Aatreya (dialogues)
- Screenplay by: P. Pullaiah
- Produced by: V. Venkateswarlu
- Starring: Akkineni Nageswara Rao; Vanisri
- Cinematography: K. S. Prasad
- Edited by: N. M. Shankar
- Music by: K. V. Mahadevan
- Production company: Padmasri Pictures
- Release date: 22 December 1972
- Running time: 145 mins
- Country: India
- Language: Telugu

Koduku Kodalu (transl. Son and Daughter-in-law) is a 1972 Telugu-language drama film, produced by V. Venkateswarlu under the Padmasri Pictures banner and directed by P. Pullaiah. It stars Akkineni Nageswara Rao and Vanisri, with music composed by K. V. Mahadevan.

== Cast ==
- Akkineni Nageswara Rao as Raja Shekar
- Vanisri as Shobha
- Lakshmi as Geetha
- S. V. Ranga Rao as Justice Raghava Rao
- Gummadi as Srihari Rao
- Jaggayya as Doctor
- Ramana Reddy as Hindi Master
- Satyanarayana as Jaganatham / Satyanandam
- Rajababu as Bujji
- Santha Kumari as Janakamma
- Suryakantham as Durgamma
- Ramaprabha as Rama
- P. R. Varalakshmi as Vasundhara
- Nirmalamma as Rangamma

== Crew ==
- Art: S. Krishna Rao
- Choreography: K. Thangappan
- Lyrics - Dialogues: Acharya Aatreya
- Playback: Ghantasala, P. Susheela, S. Janaki, L. R. Eswari
- Music: K. V. Mahadevan
- Cinematography: K. S. Prasad
- Editing: N. M. Shankar
- Producer: V. Venkateswarlu
- Screenplay - Director: P. Pullaiah
- Banner: Padmasri Pictures
- Release Date: 22 December 1972

== Soundtrack ==
Koduku Kodalu

Film score by K. V. Mahadevan
- Released: 1972
- Genre: Soundtrack
- Length: 26:02
- Label: EMI Columbia Audio
- Producer: K. V. Mahadevan

K. V. Mahadevan chronology
Bharya Biddalu (1972)	Koduku Kodalu (1972)	Kanna Thalli (1972)

Music composed by Chakravarthy. Lyrics were written by Acharya Aatreya. Music released on EMI Columbia Audio Company.

S. No.	Song title	Singers	length
1	"Goppolla Chinnadi"	Ghantasala	4:11
2	"Nuvvu Nenu Ekkamainamu"	Ghantasala, S. Janaki	4:01
3	"Cheyi Cheyi Taggilindhi"	Ghantasala, P. Susheela	4:14
4	"Neekemi Telusu"	Ghantasala, P. Susheela	3:51
5	"Nuvvu Nenu"	P. Susheela	5:32
6	"Idenannamata"	S. Janaki, P. Susheela	4:13
