= Enga Chinna Rasa =

1987 film by K. Bhagyaraj

- DVD cover
- Directed by: K. Bhagyaraj
- Written by: K. Bhagyaraj
- Produced by: S. A. Rajkannu
- Starring: K. Bhagyaraj; Radha; C. R. Saraswathi
- Cinematography: K. Rajpreeth
- Edited by: T. Thirunavukarasu; A. P. Manivannan
- Music by: Shankar–Ganesh
- Production company: Sree Amman Creations
- Release date: 17 June 1987
- Country: India
- Language: Tamil

Enga Chinna Rasa (/rɑːsɑː/ transl. Our little King) is a 1987 Indian Tamil-language drama film written, directed by, and starring K. Bhagyaraj. The story was inspired by the Kannada novel Ardhaangi by B. Puttaswamayya. It was released on 17 June 1987. The film was remade in Hindi as Beta (1992), in Kannada as Annayya, in Telugu as Abbayigaru (both in 1993), and in Odia as Santana (1998).

== Plot ==
In Mettupatti village, Chinnarasu's father remarries, bringing home Nagamani, the stepmother to Chinnarasu. Unbeknownst to Chinnarasu, his late mother had bequeathed her wealth to him through a deed, stipulating that he could only sell these assets after his marriage. Nagamani, with ulterior motives, manipulates young Chinnarasu into abandoning his education and feigns a benevolent interest in Chinnarasu's well-being, gradually gaining his trust. Chinnarasu matures into a principled young man, albeit an illiterate one, who implicitly obeys Nagamani's instructions. Chinnarasu's father is labeled as a lunatic and confined to a room. Nagamani exploits Chinnarasu's trust, squandering his wealth for her gain. Nagamani arranges for her son Gnanasekar to marry Rukmini, the daughter of Manikampalayam Sathyagounder, a landlord. However, Chinnarasu mistakenly believes Rukmini is his intended bride and travels to her village to meet her. After an initial encounter, Chinnarasu saves Rukmini from a group of miscreants at a local festival.

As night falls, Chinnarasu and his companion, Mannangatti, are allowed by Rukmini to stay there overnight when she learns that they are from the village where she is soon to be married. She also tends to Chinnarasu's wounds. The next morning, Sathyagounder returns home and Chinnarasu is shocked to discover that the actual groom is not him, but his stepbrother, Gnanasekar. Chinnarasu confronts Nagamani, but she manipulates his emotions, convincing him to acquiesce. At the marriage hall, Gnanasekar unexpectedly flees, forcing Sathyagounder to request Chinnarasu to marry Rukmini to which he reluctantly agrees. Due to his inferiority complex, Chinnarasu maintains a distance from Rukmini. However, she wholeheartedly accepts him, and they eventually consummate their marriage. Nagamani devises a plan to separate the newlywed couple but is overheard by Rukmini, and meets Chinnarasu's father, who implores her to save his son from Nagamani's exploitation. Rukmini reveals the truth about Nagamani's manipulations, but, Chinnarasu, blinded by his loyalty to Nagamani, refuses to believe Rukmini and physically assaults her. He orders her to leave the house, but she remains, determined to fulfill her father-in-law's plea.

Nagamani taunts Rukmini claiming that she will never be able to expose the truth. Rukmini reveals to Chinnarasu that Nagamani's brother is the mastermind behind the embezzlement. Nagamani's brother attempts to feign remorse, claiming that he has lost all the misappropriated funds. However, Chinnarasu retrieves the money that he had secretly stashed in his cot. Despite Nagamani's efforts to shield her brother, Chinnarasu puts him to work as a farm laborer. Nagamani devises another plan with her son, Gnanasekar, to swindle Chinnarasu's wealth under the guise of building a hospital. Chinnarasu hands over the money, but, Rukmini outsmarts them, ensuring that the funds are used to construct a hospital in their village. During the hospital's inauguration ceremony, a shocking revelation emerges: Gnanasekar had abandoned his degree and is ineligible to practice medicine, having pretended to be a doctor all along. Chinnarasu saves Gnanasekar from arrest but punishes him by assigning him to farm labor. Chinnarasu's uncle, fueled by anger, instructs his son Nattarayan to assault Mannangatti. Chinnarasu intervenes beating Nattarayan and making him marry Mannangatti's sister whom he had previously deceived.

Rukmini, Mannangatti, and Chinnarasu's father, with the help of a traditional healer, concoct a plan to limit Nagamani's control over the household, claiming that Nagamani is suffering from age-related illnesses, prompting Rukmini to take charge of the household accounts. As Rukmini's pregnancy advances, Sathyagounder visits with sweets to celebrate the upcoming arrival. Nagamani and her accomplices hatch a sinister plan to harm Rukmini, by mixing poisonous oleander seeds into the saffron intended for Rukmini's milk. Nattarayan's wife alerts Rukmini, but Chinnarasu refuses to trust Rukmini, believing his stepmother Nagamani innocent. Rukmini, determined to prove the truth, challenges Nagamani to drink the poisoned milk. Chinnarasu drinks the milk himself, proclaiming that his mother would never commit such an inhumane act. As Chinnarasu begins bleeding, confirming the presence of poison, Rukmini rushes to fetch the doctor. Chinnarasu realizes that Nagamani, whom he had trusted implicitly, had been deceiving him all along. Now, as he lies about dying from the poison, Chinnarasu acknowledges that he was foolish to trust her for so long, despite warnings from others. Nagamani's accomplices lock Chinnarasu in a room and threaten Rukmini demanding her to sign over the family's assets.

However, Nagamani transforms, ordering her accomplices to release Chinnarasu and acknowledging her mistakes due to her obsession with wealth. But Gnanasekar turns against his mother and uses physical force to retrieve the document and Nagamani screams for Chinnarasu's help. Chinnarasu musters his strength to fight off Gnanasekar and his accomplices, saves Rukmini and Nagamani, and collapses. Finally, Chinnarasu and Rukmini leave their home, relinquishing their properties for Nagamani, but, Nagamani, now filled with remorse, falls at Chinnarasu's feet, begging for forgiveness.

== Cast ==
- K. Bhagyaraj as Chinnarasu
- Radha as Rukmini, Chinnarasu's wife
- Jai Ganesh as Manikampalayam Sathyagounder, Rukmini's father
- Idichapuli Selvaraj as Chinnarasu's father
- C. R. Saraswathi as Nagamani, Chinnarasu's stepmother
- Kuladeivam Rajagopal as Chinnarasu's uncle
- Bayilvan Ranganathan as a village healer
- Mannangatti Subramaniam as Mannangatti, Chinnarasu's sidekick

== Production ==
Padmapriya was initially chosen for the title character stepmother's role; however Bhagyaraj found her too young for this role and replaced her with C. R. Saraswathi.

== Soundtrack ==
The soundtrack was composed by Shankar–Ganesh, with lyrics by Vaali. The song "Konda Seval" was re-used in its Telugu and Hindi remakes.

Song	Singers	Length
"Eduda Melam"	S. P. Balasubrahmanyam	04:19
"Enn Raathukkam"	S. P. Balasubrahmanyam	04:23
"Kondai Seval Koovum"	S. P. Balasubrahmanyam, S. Janaki	04:03
"Mama Unakku Oru"	S. P. Balasubrahmanyam, S. Janaki	04:10
"Naan Thandhana"	S. P. Balasubrahmanyam	04:14
"Then Pandi Cheemai"	S. P. Balasubrahmanyam, S. Janaki	04:32

== Reception ==
Jayamanmadhan of Kalki praised the acting of Bhagyaraj, C. R. Saraswathi and also praised Radha's plans to counter Saraswathi and last half an hour.

== Legacy ==
The film became a major breakthrough for Saraswathi, so much that the general public began referring to her as "Aatha" (stepmother) the way the character is addressed onscreen.
