= Abbayigaru =

- Theatrical release poster
- Directed by: E. V. V. Satyanarayana
- Written by: Jandhyala (dialogues)
- Screenplay by: E. V. V. Satyanarayana
- Story by: K. Bhagyaraj
- Based on: Enga Chinna Rasa by K. Bhagyaraj
- Produced by: M. Narasimha Rao
- Starring: Venkatesh; Meena
- Cinematography: V. Srinivasa Reddy
- Edited by: K. Ravindra Babu
- Music by: M. M. Keeravani
- Production company: Raasi Movies
- Release date: 30 September 1993
- Running time: 154 minutes
- Country: India
- Language: Telugu

Abbayigaru is a 1993 Indian Telugu-language comedy drama film, produced by M. Narasimha Rao under Raasi Movies and directed by E. V. V. Satyanarayana. It stars Venkatesh and Meena, with music composed by M. M. Keeravani. The film was a hit at the box office. It is a remake of the 1987 Tamil film Enga Chinna Rasa. The film was dubbed in Tamil as Chinna Yejaman, despite the original Tamil version's existence.

== Plot ==
Dora Babu is the only child of a multi-millionaire Venkatrayudu, who can provide his son with anything he wants, but he loves his mother who ends up dying and his only desire is his mother's love. Venkatrayudu cheers him up by remarrying a woman Nagamani, a greedy lady who loves money, thinking that she will care for his son as her natural son. Nagamani and her brother make Venkatrayudu paralyzed, consider him as a mental patient and eventually lock him in a room of the family home. Dora Babu becomes devoted to Nagamani, she raises Dora Babu as an uneducated boy since he does anything she says, loves her a lot does whatever she asks of him.

Dora Babu meets Sudha in a marriage and keeps following her. She is being abducted and assaulted at a fair, he rescues her. The two fall in love and despite the villagers believing she is no longer chaste, he marries her and goes to his mother. Nagamani hates that and separates them with her tactics. Sudha discovers that and her motherly love for Dora Babu is a ruse in an attempt to discredit the sanity of Venkatrayudu, and thus is unable to interfere with the plan Nagamani has for the family fortune to be diverted to Dora Babu's step brother Murari, the real son of Nagamani who also shares his mother's greed. A battle of wills between the Nagamani and Sudha ensues.

Nagamani sees that her influence over the family is being challenged by Sudha who insists that Venkatrayudu leave his prison and return to the family circle as there is nothing wrong with him. She makes Dora Babu aware of the intentions of his mother. Nagamani starts to abuse and embarrass Sudha with all the family members present. Sudha is ready to leave, but then, to protect her husband and her house from Nagamani's intentions, she decides to apologize to her mother-in-law. Sudha then cleverly starts exposing Nagamani's every effort and intention in a dignified manner so that her husband will not be offended.

Sudha becoming pregnant prompts Nagamani to attempt to kill her and her unborn child with poison. Sudha discovers this and tells her husband. He continues to refuse to believe the treachery although she takes an oath upon her unborn child's life. Dora Babu defends his mother and offers to prove that Sudha is wrong. Dora Babu drinks the milk, He comes to the realization that what Sudha said was all along his mother's intentions. In his usual innocent manner, he asks her why, when all she had to do was simply ask for the wealth—he would have happily agreed to give it all, his words so deeply touched Nagamani that she realises her cruelty has been directed at the only son, who all along had loved her.

Finally, the film concludes with Dora Babu recovering, agreeing to give up to his mother his worldly possessions and leaving home with his wife. At the last moment, Nagamani begs him not to leave, claiming to have learned the error of her ways. She tears up the legal papers and tells him that all she wants is nothing more than Dora Babu.

== Cast ==
- Venkatesh as Dora Babu
- Meena as Sudha
- Srikanth as Murari
- Jayachitra as Nagamani
- Nutan Prasad as Venkatrayudu
- Kota Srinivasa Rao
- Brahmanandam as Obayya
- Babu Mohan as Bush
- Mallikarjuna Rao
- AVS as Gumastha
- P. L. Narayana as Sudha's father
- Sivaji Raja as Sivaji
- Jeeva
- Tirupathi Prakash
- Y. Vijaya
- Chidatala Appa Rao
- K. K. Sarma
- Ironleg Sastri
- "Fight Master" Raju
- Lathasri
- Siva Parvathi as Pramila

== Production ==
Abbayigaru is a remake of the 1987 Tamil film Enga Chinna Rasa, directed by and starring K. Bhagyaraj. The original, a low-budget production co-starring Radha, was a critical and commercial success. Its emotional mother-son storyline and box office performance inspired remakes in several languages, including the Hindi adaptation Beta (1992), starring Anil Kapoor and Madhuri Dixit, which became the highest-grossing Hindi film of that year.

Actor Krishna initially acquired the Telugu remake rights for Enga Chinna Rasa and planned to produce and star in it under his Padmalaya Studios banner. He envisioned senior actress Vanisri in the key role of the mother. However, Vanisri declined the offer due to a previous dispute with Krishna's wife, Vijaya Nirmala, leading to delays. Producers Ankapparaju Chowdary and Annaraju, who had previously collaborated with Krishna on Nagastram (1990), later showed interest in remaking the film with him, but the project did not progress.

Eventually, producer M. Narasimha Rao of Raasi Movies purchased the remake rights from Padmalaya Studios for ₹30 lakh. He recast the film with Venkatesh in the lead role and titled it Abbayigaru. Krishna attended the film's launch event, gave the inaugural clap, and expressed confidence that the film would surpass the box office records of Venkatesh's earlier hit, Chanti (1992). Released on September 30, 1993, Abbayigaru was a commercial success, surpassing Chanti's collections in some regions as predicted by Krishna.

== Music ==
Abbayigaru

Film score by M. M. Keeravani
- Released: 1993
- Genre: Soundtrack
- Length: 29:59
- Label: SURYA Audio
- Producer: M. M. Keeravani

M. M. Keeravani chronology
Mister Pellam (1993)	Abbayigaru (1993)	Allari Alludu (1993)

Music was composed by M. M. Keeravani. Audio was released on Surya Audio Company. The song "Koosindi Koyilamma" is based on the song "Konda Cheval" from Enga Chinna Rasa.

No.	Title	Lyrics	Singer(s)	Length
1.	"Koosindhi Koyilamma"	Bhuvanachandra	S. P. Balasubrahmanyam, Chitra	5:09
2.	"Nee Tassa Diyya"	Veturi	S. P. Balasubrahmanyam, Chitra	5:00
3.	"O Kanne Poova"	Veturi	S. P. Balasubrahmanyam, Chitra	5:03
4.	"Vennelaki Em Telusu"	Bhuvanachandra	S. P. Balasubrahmanyam, Chitra	4:47
5.	"Thadikendhuku Adhirindhi"	Bhuvanachandra	S. P. Balasubrahmanyam, Chitra, Bhuvanachandra, Ramana, Raj, Ramola	5:05
6.	"Amma Amma"	Vennelakanti	S. P. Balasubrahmanyam	4:52
Total length:				29:59

== Reception ==
Released on September 30, 1993, Abbayigaru was a commercial success.
