= Ardhangi =

- Theatrical release poster
- Directed by: P. Pullayya
- Screenplay by: Acharya Aatreya
- Story by: Manilal Banerjee
- Based on: Swayamsiddha (novel) by Manilal Banerjee
- Starring: Akkineni Nageswara Rao; Santha Kumari; Savitri
- Cinematography: Madhav Bulbule
- Edited by: B. Narasimha Rao; Sri Raamulu
- Music by: Master Venu; B. Narasimha Rao
- Production company: Ragini Pictures
- Distributed by: Rajasri Pictures
- Release date: 26 January 1955
- Running time: 152 minutes
- Country: India
- Language: Telugu

Ardhangi (transl. Other half) is a 1955 Indian Telugu-language drama film, produced and directed by P. Pullayya under the Ragini Pictures banner. It stars Akkineni Nageswara Rao, Santha Kumari, and Savitri. The film's music is composed by Master Venu and B. Narasimha Rao. Acharya Aatreya wrote the script based on Maddipatla Suri's Telugu translation of the Bengali novel Swayamsidda written by Manilal Banerjee. The film was successful at the box office. It received the National Film Award for Best Feature Film in Telugu and the Filmfare Award for Best Film - Telugu. The film was remade in Tamil as Pennin Perumai and in Hindi as Bahurani (1963).

== Cast ==
- Akkineni Nageswara Rao as Raghunatha Rao / Raghu
- Savitri as Padmavati
- Santha Kumari as Rajeswari Devi
- Gummadi as Zamindar Bhujangarao
- Jaggayya as Nagendra Rao / Nagu
- Surabhi Balasaraswathi as Neelaveni
- Chadalavada as Bheemudu
- Nagabhushanam as Veeraiah
- Dr. Sivaramakrishnaiah as Appula Sivakamaiah
- Dr. Kamaraju as Diwanji Kakkaiah
- Doraiswamy as Bhushaiah
- B. Narasimha Rao as Musalaiah

== Production ==
P. Pullayya originally wanted N. T. Rama Rao to play the mentally disabled Raghu and Akkineni Nageswara Rao as Raghu's half-brother Nagu. Nageswara Rao felt the negative role would not suit him, and was later cast as Raghu, which he preferred as he considered it "more challenging". The role of Nagu ultimately went to Jaggayya. Pullayya cast Gummadi as the zamindar Bhujangarao at the suggestion of film producer T. V. S. Sastri.

== Soundtrack ==
Music composed by Master Venu & B. Narasimha Rao. Lyrics were written by Acharya Aatreya.

S. No.	Song title	Singers	length
1	"Intiki Deepam Illale"	Akula Narasimha Rao	2:39
2	"Ekkadamma Chandrudu"	Jikki	2:37
3	"Pelli Muhurtham Kudirindha"	P. Leela	2:40
4	"Edche Vallani Edavani"	P. Leela	3:35
5	"Radhanu Rammannadu"	Akula Narasimha Rao	2:16
6	"Raka Raka Vachavu"	Jikki	1:57
7	"Vaddura Kannayya"	Jikki	1:58
8	"Tharalirava"	Ghantasala	2:09

== Box office ==
The film ran for more than 100 days in 5 centers in Andhra Pradesh.

== Awards ==
- 1955 - National Film Award for Best Feature Film in Telugu - Certificate of Merit
