= Piriya Vidai =

- Poster
- Directed by: Srikanth
- Written by: A. S. Prakasam (dialogues)
- Based on: Thalla? Pellama? by N. T. Rama Rao
- Produced by: L. V. Prasad
- Starring: R. Muthuraman; Prameela
- Music by: G. K. Venkatesh
- Production company: Prasad Productions
- Release date: 15 August 1975
- Country: India
- Language: Tamil

Piriya Vidai (transl. Farewell) is a 1975 Indian Tamil-language drama film directed by Srikanth and produced by L. V. Prasad. Starring R. Muthuraman and Prameela, it is a remake of the 1970 Telugu film Thalla? Pellama?. The film was released on 15 August 1975 and failed commercially. The film had two song sequences filmed in colour.

== Cast ==
- R. Muthuraman
- Prameela
- V. K. Ramasamy
- Thengai Srinivasan
- Nagesh
- Udaya Chandrika
- Vennira Aadai Moorthy
- K. Vijaya
- Vijayachandrika
- Santhakumari
- Master Sekar

== Production ==
Piriya Vidai is a remake of the 1970 Telugu film Thalla? Pellama?, written and directed by N. T. Rama Rao. A set costing ₹3 lakh (equivalent to ₹84 lakh or US$88,000 in 2023) was built for the film.

== Soundtrack ==
The soundtrack was composed by G. K. Venkatesh, and lyrics were written by Vaali.

Track listing
No.	Title	Singer(s)	Length
1.	"Ennuyire Ponnoliye"	S. Janaki
2.	"Raja Parunga Rajavai Parunga"	S. P. Balasubrahmanyam, S. Janaki
3.	"Piriyavidai Meendum Vanthathu"	P. Susheela
4.	"Karunai Kadale Karmugil Manna"	G. K. Venkatesh, P. Susheela

== Release and reception ==
Piriya Vidai was released on 15 August 1975. Kanthan of Kalki praised the cast performances and A. S. Prakasam's dialogues, but criticised Srikanth's direction. The film failed commercially; Prasad felt this was due to the story "being unsuitable for Tamil audience" and miscasting.
