= Mutyala Saralu =

Compilation of Telugu poems by Gurajada Apparao

Mutyala Saralu (Telugu: ముత్యాల సరాలు) is a compilation of Telugu poems written by Gurajada Apparao in 1910. The compilation heralded the beginning of modern poetry in Telugu language. The traditional meter is replaced by a new lyrical and four beat balladic rhythm. These poems reflected the general social transformation in India.

== Compilation ==
- Mutyala Saralu
- Deshabhakti including Desamunu Preminchumanna
- Kasulu
- Daman - Pithius
- Lavanaraju Dream
- Kanyaka
- Korukonda
- Poornamma
- Manishi
- Dinchu Langaru
- Langarettumu

== Desamunu Preminchumanna ==
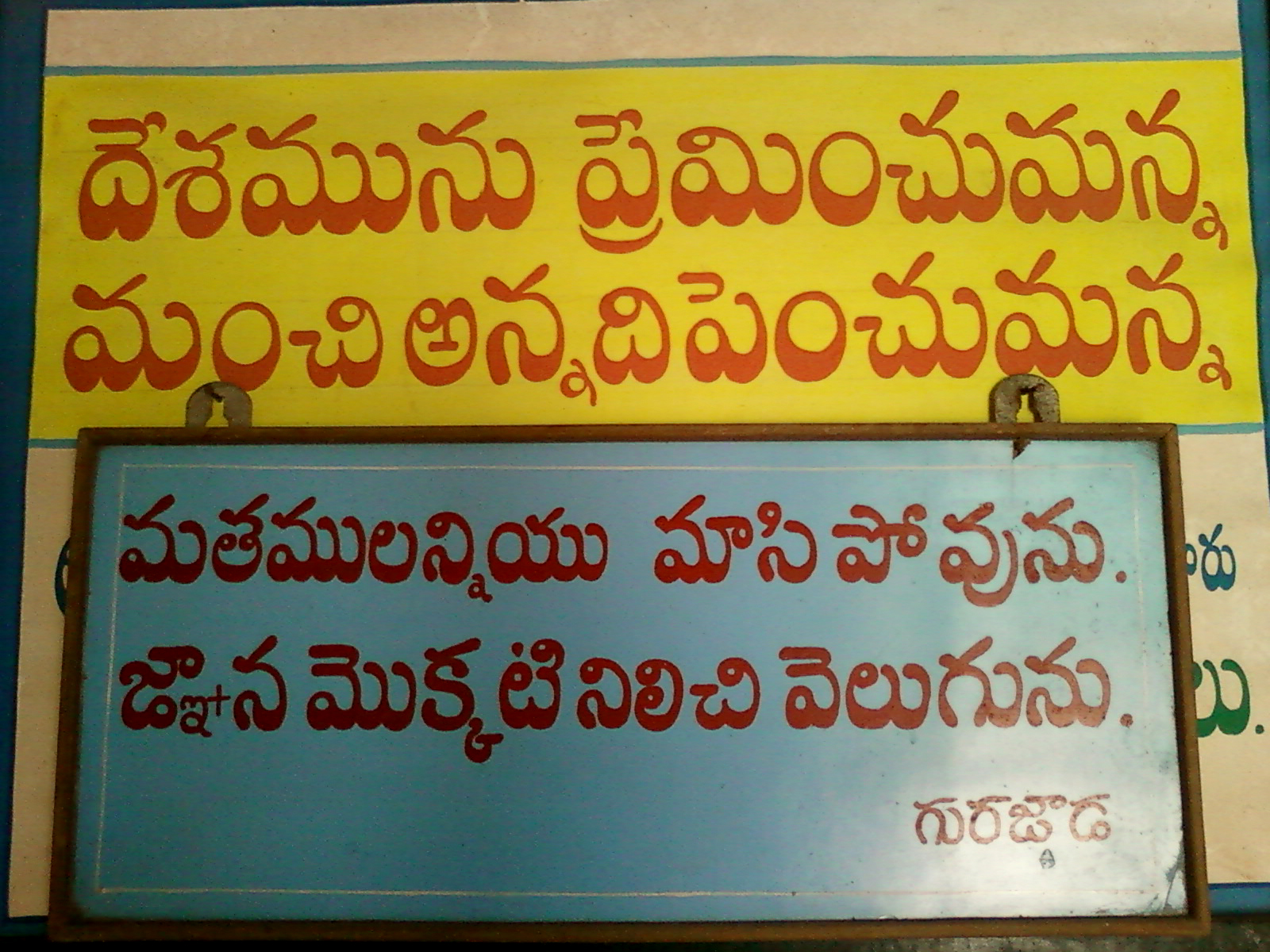
Poetic lines by Gurazada Apparao garu

Desamunu Preminchumanna (Telugu: దేశమును ప్రేమించుమన్నా) is a Telugu patriotic song written by Apparao. The song has inspired many Indians to dedicate their lives for the service of their Nation.

=== The Song ===
desamunu preminchumanna,
manchi annadi penchumanna,
votti maatalu kattipettoy,
gattimel thalapettavoy.

desamante matti kaadhoyi,
desamante manushuloyi

Meaning: A country is not made of land; a country is made of its people.

=== Film ===
"Desamunu Preminchumanna"

Song
- Published: 1910
- Genre: Soundtrack
- Songwriter: Gurazada Apparao

Some portion of the Desamunu Preminchumanna is incorporated in the 1954 Telugu film Jyoti starring Savitri and G. Varalakshmi. The song has the voice of G. Varalakshmi.

=== Complete Song ===
- Complete poem in Telugu Wikisource at s:te:దేశమును ప్రేమించుమన్నా

== Poornamma ==
Poornamma or Purnamma (Telugu: పూర్ణమ్మ) song was written by Apparao in 1912. Ghantasala composed music and sang this popular song.

=== The Song ===
melimi bangaru melatallara
kaluvala kannula kannellara
tallulaganna pillallara
vinnaramma ee kathanu.

aatala paatala petikalara
kammani matala kommallara
ammalaganna ammallara
vinnaramma ee kathanu.

kannula kanthulu kaluvala cherenu
melimi jerenu meni pasal
hamsala jerenu nadakala bedagulu
durganu cherenu poornamma.

=== Complete song ===
- Complete poem in Telugu Wikisource at s:te:పూర్ణమ్మ
