= Pennin Perumai =

1956 film by P. Pullayya

- Theatrical release poster
- Directed by: P. Pullayya
- Screenplay by: Thanjai N. Ramaiah Dass (dialogues)
- Story by: Manilal Banerjee
- Produced by: P. Pullayya
- Starring: Sivaji Ganesan; Gemini Ganesan; Savitri; Santha Kumari
- Cinematography: P. L. Rai
- Edited by: P. Narasimha Rao; Sri Ramulu
- Music by: Songs: B. N. Rao; A. Rama Rao; Score: Master Venu
- Production company: Ragini Films
- Distributed by: Rajshri
- Release date: 17 February 1956
- Country: India
- Language: Tamil

Pennin Perumai (transl. The Pride of Womanhood) is a 1956 Indian Tamil-language film directed by P. Pullayya, starring Sivaji Ganesan, Gemini Ganesan, Savitri and Santha Kumari. It is a remake of the 1955 Telugu film Ardhangi, which was based on Maddipatla Suri's Telugu translation of the Bengali novel Swayamsiddha, written by Manilal Banerjee. The film was released on 17 February 1956.

== Plot ==
Padma is forced to marry a mentally dull man Raghu, whom she eventually makes a normal human while teaching a lesson to his scheming step-mother and step-brother.

== Cast ==
- Sivaji Ganesan as Nagu
- Gemini Ganesan as Ragu
- Savitri as Padma
- Santha Kumari as Rajeswari
- V. Nagayya as Zamindar
- M. N. Rajam as Neela

== Production ==
Pennin Perumai was the first film where Gemini and Sivaji Ganesan acted together. Durai, who later became a director, was a sound engineer for the film.

== Soundtrack ==
The music was composed by B. N. Rao and A. Rama Rao. Background score was provided by Master Venu. All lyrics were penned by Thanjai N. Ramaiah Dass. The song "Azhuvadhaa Illai Sirippadhaa" is the first duet T. M. Soundararajan and P. Susheela sang together.

Song	Singers	Length
"Kannaa Maraiyaadhedaa"	Jikki	02:56
"Azhuvadhaa Illai Sirippadhaa"	T. M. Soundararajan & P. Susheela	04:22
"Idhaya Vaanil Oliyai Veesum Vennilaave"	P. Leela	03:52
"Kanni Thamizh Naadu"	Seerkazhi Govindarajan	02:51
"Koovudhu Koovudhu Seval Koovudhu"	P. Leela & Jikki	03:05
"Krishnaa Un Seyalaal"	Ghantasala	03:03
"Kanden Kanavile En Pangiye"	P. Leela	02:36
"Mudiyumaa Adhu Mudiyumaa"	P. Suseela	03:13
"Vandhu Vandhu Konjuvadhaen Vennilaave"	Jikki	03:30
"Utthamane Ulagil Nilaippadhu"	Seerkazhi Govindarajan	01:42
"Vaazhkai Odam Karai Serum Munne"	P. Leela	04:07
"Mukoorttha Naaum Mudivaachchaa"	Jikki	03:41

== Reception ==
Kanthan of Kalki praised the performances of the main cast, especially Gemini Ganesan for deviating from the caring, affectionate and romantic characters he was known for portraying. The Indian Express wrote, "All-round acting of very high order in a powerful drama of human emotions easily marks out Ragini Films' Pennin Perumai as a class picture". The critic also appreciated Thanjai N. Ramaiah Dass' dialogues.
