= Jyoti (1981 film) =

1981 film by Pramod Chakravarty

- Theatrical release poster
- Directed by: Pramod Chakravarty
- Screenplay by: Sachin Bhaumick
- Based on: Swayamsiddha by Manilal Banerjee
- Produced by: Pramod Chakravarty
- Starring: Jeetendra; Hema Malini
- Cinematography: S.R.K. Murthy
- Edited by: Narendra Arora
- Music by: Bappi Lahiri
- Production company: Pramod Films
- Release date: 6 May 1981
- Running time: 144 minutes
- Country: India
- Language: Hindi

Jyoti (transl. Light) is a 1981 Indian Hindi-language action drama film, produced and directed by Pramod Chakravarty, and written by Sachin Bhowmick. The film is a remake of the 1975 Bengali film Swayamsiddha, which itself is based on Manilal Banerjee's eponymous novel. It stars Jeetendra and Hema Malini, with music composed by Bappi Lahiri.

== Cast ==
- Jeetendra as Govind Pratap Singh
- Hema Malini as Gauri
- Ashok Kumar as Raja Saab
- Shashikala as Sunanda
- Om Shivpuri as Vedji
- Ajit as Amirchand
- Vijayendra Ghatge as Niranjan Pratap Singh
- Deven Verma as Siyaram
- Birbal as Lallu
- Viju Khote
- C.S.Dubey
- Aruna Irani as Mallika
- Sulochana Latkar as Daimaa
- Jayshree T. as Champa
- Padma Khanna as Chintamani

== Soundtrack ==
The music was composed by Bappi Lahiri. The song "Chidiya Chon Chon" is based on "Marianne" by Roaring Lion. The song "Thoda Resham Lagta Hai" had fallen into obscurity for over two decades, but gained wider attention in 2002 when it was sampled by American producer DJ Quik for the Truth Hurts song "Addictive" which led to a legal dispute that was ultimately resolved. Shortly thereafter, the original song was remixed by Indian composer Harry Anand as "Kaliyon Ka Chaman", sung by Assamese singer Shaswati Phukan.

Title	Singer(s)
"Angrai Leke Prem"	Lata Mangeshkar
"Chidiya Chon Chon"	Kishore Kumar
"Sooni Sej Saja Doon"	Lata Mangeshkar
"Sun Ri Yashoda Maiya"	Lata Mangeshkar
"Thoda Resham Lagta Hai"	Lata Mangeshkar

== Bibliography ==
- Arunachalam, Param (2020). BollySwar: 1981–1990. Mavrix Infotech. ISBN 9788193848227.
- Roberts, Tamara (2016). "Toward an Afro Asian Theory of Critique: The "Addictive" Case". Resounding Afro Asia: Interracial Music and the Politics of Collaboration. Oxford University Press. ISBN 978-0-19-937741-1.
