= B. Puttaswamayya =

Indian novelist, playwright and journalist

- Born: 24 May 1897
- Died: 25 January 1984 (aged 86)
- Occupation: writer

B. Puttaswamayya (kannada:ಬಿ. ಪುಟ್ಟಸ್ವಾಮಯ್ಯ) (24 May 1897 – 25 January 1984) was an Indian novelist, playwright and journalist who wrote in the Kannada language. He was awarded the prestigious Sahitya Academy Award in 1964 for his novel Kranthi Kalyana, and the Sangeet Natak Akademi Fellowship in 1978 for his plays by the Government of India.

== Writings ==
=== Historical fiction ===
- Kranthi Kalyana ( 6 vol) - Udayaravi, Rajyapala, kalyaneshwara, nagabandha, mugiyada kanasu, Kalyana kranti - based on life of Sri basavanna
- Mrunalini (Translation of Bengali Novel by Bankim Chandra Chatterjee)
- Thejaswini (Translation of Bengali Novel by Bankim Chandra Chatterjee's Rajasimha)
- Prabhudeva
- Roopalekha - Imaginary story at the backdrop Vijayanagar empire - Devaraya II - 1442-1446 time frame
- Itihasada Putagalinda - Historical Short stories
- Dwa Suparna - 7th century story happening during the Gangaa Period
- Priyadarshi Raja - Emperor Ashoka story
- Chalukya Tailapa - Tailapa founder of Kalyana Chalukya

=== Social fiction ===
- Ardhangi (translation of Manilal Banerjee's Bengali novel Swayamsiddha - filmed as Mallammana Pavaada)
- Hoovu Kaavu
- Sudhamayi
- Abhisaarike (sequel for Sudhamayi)
- Ratnahaara
- Natya Mohini

=== Play and literary criticism ===
- Samagra Natakagalu
- Mooru Natakagalu
- Kurukshetra
- Chirakumara Sabha
- Dashavatara
- Taraka Vadhe
- Dravaswamini

=== Religion ===
- Shivamahinma Sutra Soundrya Lahari
- Sri Durgasaptashati
- Sri Lalita Sahasara Sangatya
- Sampurna Ramayana
