= Sarangadhara =

Epic story

- Original language: Telugu
- Written by: Gurajada Apparao
- Characters: Sarangadhara; Rajaraja Narendra; Chitrangi; Vijayaditya
- Genre: Historical
- Setting: Rajamahendri

Premiere
- Date: 1883
- Place: Rajamahendri, British India

Sarangadhara is an epic story about the reign of Rajaraja Narendra, an Eastern Chalukya king. Gurajada Apparao wrote the story in long poetic form in English and published it in "Indian Leisure Hour" in 1883. It is a popular Telugu drama and made into South Indian films.

== The story ==
Rajaraja Narendra was ruling the Vengi country from his capital of Rajamahendri. He had a son by name Sarangadhara with Queen Ratnangi. He was very affectionate towards his second wife Chitrangi. He had a bitter enemy, his step-brother, Vijayaditya.

One day Chitrangi invited her step-son Sarangadhara for a feast. Sarangadhara ignored the invitation as he was leaving for a hunt. His step-mother was very upset with him and it was brought to the notice of Vijayaditya by his sources. Vijayaditya made a propaganda of an affair between Sarangadhara and his step-mother with the motive of creating conflict in the house of Rajaraja Narendra. Without proper inquiry, Rajaraja Narendra ordered the chopping off the limbs of the innocent Sarangadhara. The king's orders had to be obeyed and so the punishment was meted out to the prince in the mountain forest.

Sarangadhara was lying in a pool of blood screaming in agony, drawing the attention of Meghanadha a devotee of Siva, who immediately rushed to Sarangadhara and did whatever he could to alleviate the pain and advised Sarangadhara to pray to Lord Shiva and get his blessings. Lord Siva, moved by Sarangadhara's prayer, returned his lost limbs and made him a handsome person.

== Film and stage adaptations ==
In his early years as a stage artiste associated with the Rama Vilasa Sabha of Chitoor, actor V. Nagayya secured critical acclaim for his performance in the role of Chitrangi. Pammal Sambandha Mudaliar adapted to stage dramas and popularized the story in Tamil. S. G. Kittappa and M. K. Thyagaraja Bhagavathar had acted and sung in the various Tamil stage adaptations of Sarangadhara.

=== 1930 film ===
Sarangadhara is a 1930 silent film directed by Y. V. Rao under the General Pictures Corporation.

=== 1935 Tamil film ===
Sarangadhara is a 1935 Tamil film directed by V. S. K. Padham under the Lotus Pictures, filmed at Wadia Movietone Studios of JBH and Homi Wadia brothers in Mumbai. It stars Kothamangalam Seenu and T. M. Saradhambal. Seenu sang songs like Vidhiyai VendRavar Yaar and songs already popularized by S. G. Kittappa in stage dramas such as Vedikkaiyaagave and Kodaiyile in the movie.

=== 1936 Tamil film ===
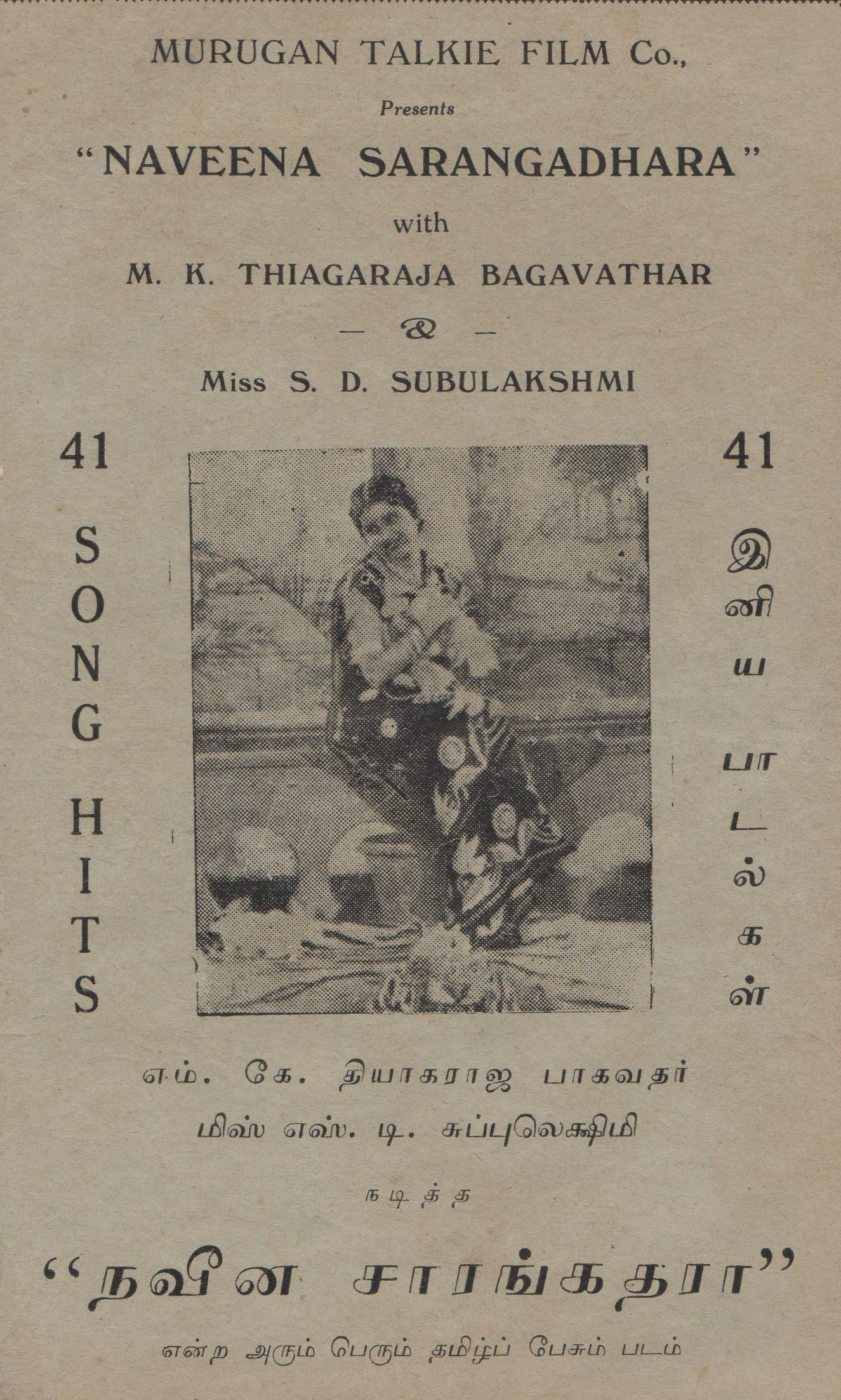
Poster

Naveena Sarangadhara is a 1936 Tamil film directed by K. Subramaniam under Murugan Talkies. Naveena in Tamil means modern. The movie was titled thus in order to distinguish it from the earlier versions and to highlight the slight changes made to the original story. The cast includes M. K. Thyagaraja Bhagavathar and S. D. Subbulakshmi supported by S. S. Mani Bhagavathar, G. Pattu Iyer and Indubala. Papanasam Sivan had written the lyrics and composed music for M. K. Thyagaraja Bhagavathar songs such as Sivaperuman krupai Vendum, Gnana kumarai nadana singari and abaraatham seithariyen. The film had a successful run on the big screen.
