= Gurajada Apparao =

Indian writer and poet (1862–1915)

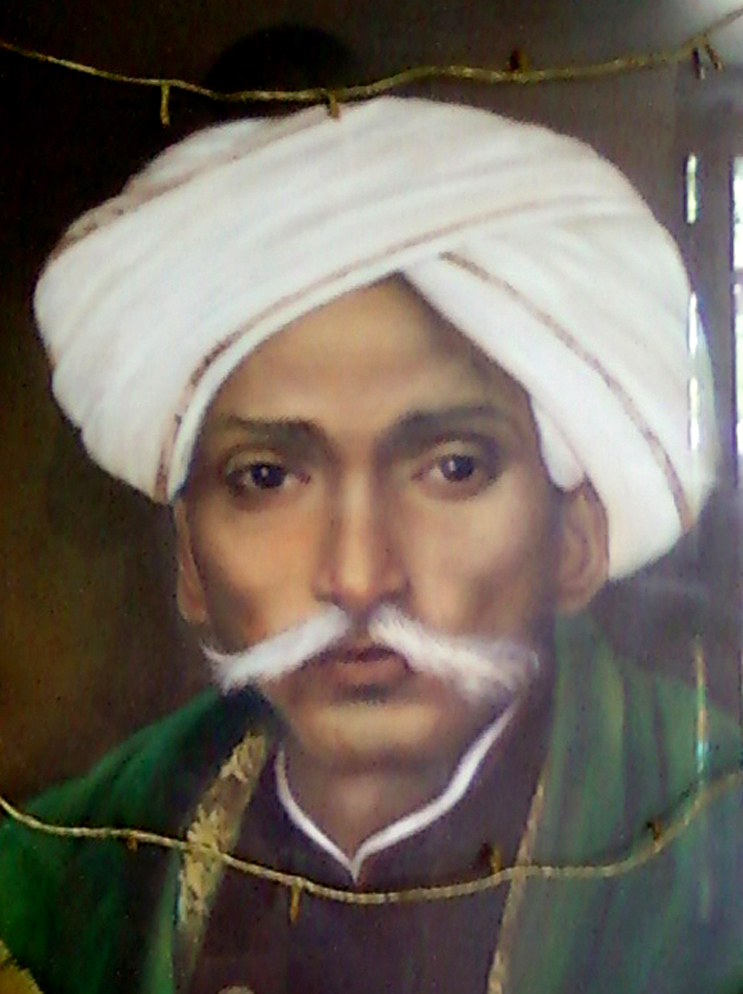
- Born: Gurajada Venkata Apparao; 21 September 1862; S.Rayavaram, Madras Presidency, British India (now in Andhra Pradesh, India)
- Died: 30 November 1915 (aged 53); Srikakulam, Madras Presidency, British India (now in Andhra Pradesh, India)
- Occupations: Playwright; Dramatist; Poet
- Known for: Kanyasulkam; Sarangadhara; Mutyala Saralu; Poornamma
- Spouse(s): Appala Narasamma, 1885
- Children: Lakshmi Narasamma (daughter); Venkata Ramadasu (son)
- Awards: Emeritus Fellow, University of Madras

Gurajada Venkata Apparao (21 September 1862 – 30 November 1915) was an Indian playwright, dramatist, poet, and writer known for his works in Telugu theatre. Rao wrote the play Kanyasulkam in 1892, which is considered as the greatest play in the Telugu language. One of the pioneers of Indian theatre, Apparao holds the titles Kavisekhara and Abyudaya Kavitha Pithamahudu. In 1910, Rao scripted the widely known Telugu patriotic song "Desamunu Preminchumanna".

In 1897, Kanyasulkam was published (by Vavilla Ramaswamy Sastrulu and Sons, Madras) and dedicated to Maharaja Ananda Gajapati. Apparao (along with his brother Syamala Rao) wrote several English poems. His epic Sarangadhara, published in "Indian Leisure Hour", was well received. The editor of the Calcutta-based "Rees and Ryot", Sambhu Chandra Mukherji re-published it in his magazine. Gundukurti Venkata Ramanayya, editor of the "Indian Leisure Hour", encouraged Apparao greatly during the same period. In 1891, Gurajada was appointed to the post of Epigraphist to the Maharaja of Vizianagaram.

== Early life and education ==
Gurajada was born in a Hindu family of Niyogi Brahmin caste on 21 September 1862 at his maternal uncle's home in Rayavaram village, near Yelamanchili, Anakapalli district. His parents were Venkata Rama Dasu and Kausalyamma. Gurajada lived most of his life in and around Vizianagaram in what was then called as Kalinga Rajyam. He and his father before him were both employed by the princely state of Vizianagaram. Gurajada enjoyed a close relationship with the ruling family during his adult life. He had his initial schooling in Cheepurupalli while his father was working there. His remaining schooling was done at Vizianagaram after his father died. During that time, he was taken care of by the then M.R. College Principal, C. Chandrasekhara Sastri who provided him free lodging and boarding. He completed his matriculation in 1882 and obtained F.A. in 1884. Soon after, he was employed as a teacher in M.R. High School in 1884 with a salary of Rs.25.

In 1887, Gurajada spoke at a Congress Party meeting in Vizianagaram. His daughter Voleti Lakshmi Narasamma was born in 1887. He was simultaneously involved in social work and became a member of the Voluntary Service Corps in Visakhapatnam in 1888. He was elected vice-president of the Ananda Gajapati Debating club in 1889. His son Gurajada Venkata Ramadasu was born in 1890. In 1891 he was promoted to Lecturer (Level III) with a salary of Rs.125. He taught the F.A. and B.A. classes several subjects including English Grammar, Sanskrit Literature, Translation, Greek and Roman Histories. His younger brother Syamala Rao died in 1892 while studying at Madras Law College.

=== 1908 Congress session at Madras ===
In 1911, he was appointed to the Board of Studies by Madras University. The same year, Gurajada and his friends started the Andhra Sahitya Parishat to promote use of spoken dialects. The next year, he was invited to attend the meeting of the Bangeeya Sahitya Parishat (Bengal Literary Association) at Calcutta.

=== Kanyasulkam ===
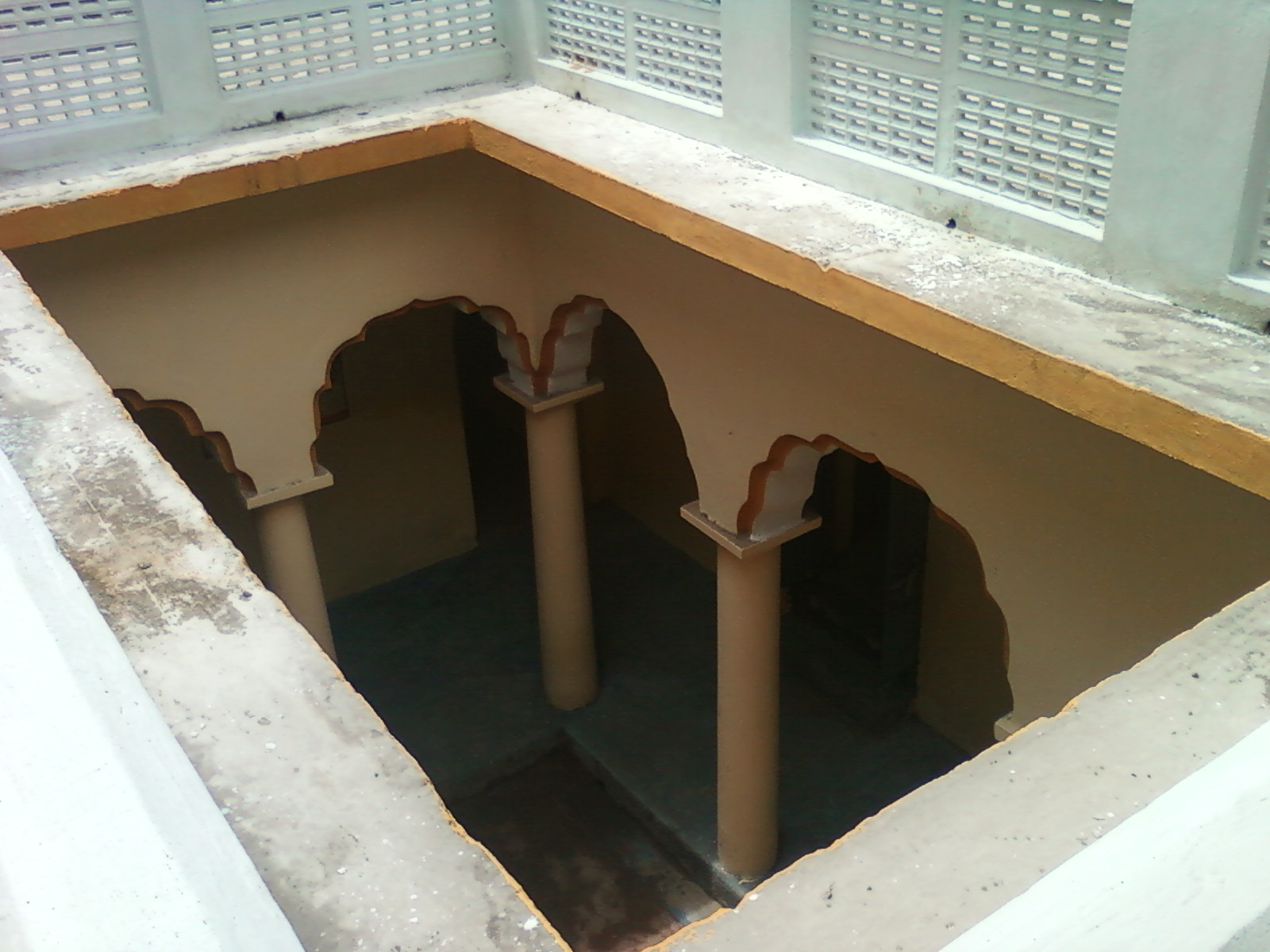
Gurajada Apparao house (presently a memorial library) in Vizianagaram, Andhra Pradesh

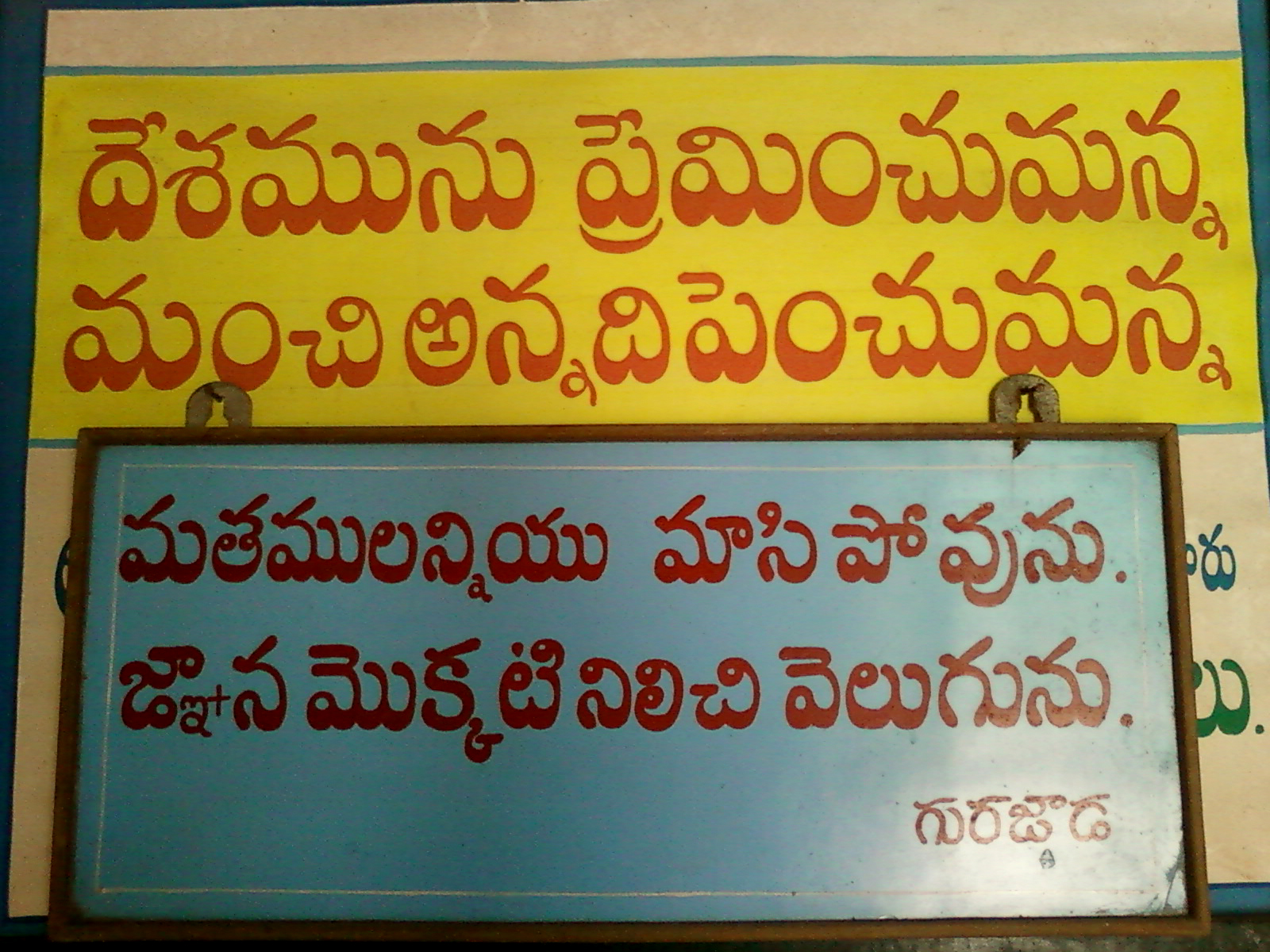
Poetic lines by Sri Gurajada Apparao garu

Kanyasulkam is about the deplorable condition of widows in traditional Brahmin families in the Andhra region of India during the 19th century. The play is a highly thought-provoking social drama dealing with social issues relevant to the time. Gurajada Apparao was deeply troubled by the double standards, hypocrisy and social inequalities in the Indian society. The English preface to the first edition of his play states: "Such a scandalous state of things is a disgrace to society, and literature can not have a higher function than to show up such practices and give currency to a high standard of moral ideas. Until reading habits prevail among masses, one must look only to the stage to exert such healthy influence."

Perhaps for the first time in Telugu literary history, a prostitute was given a very positive image so much so that she is shown to better the lives of many people during the course of the play. The play is ageless in the sense that its projection of the Indian mindset and psyche is very relevant and applicable in Indian Society today. The play was, in some ways, ahead of its time and was very bold in criticizing the popular opinions and practices during that era. It frequently jabs at the male-dominated society of India, by bringing to the forefront certain egoistic idiosyncrasies of a typical Indian male, in an unflattering manner. It also questions the practices of witchcraft, sorcery, and their popular usage in medical practice during that period in India.

== Personal life ==
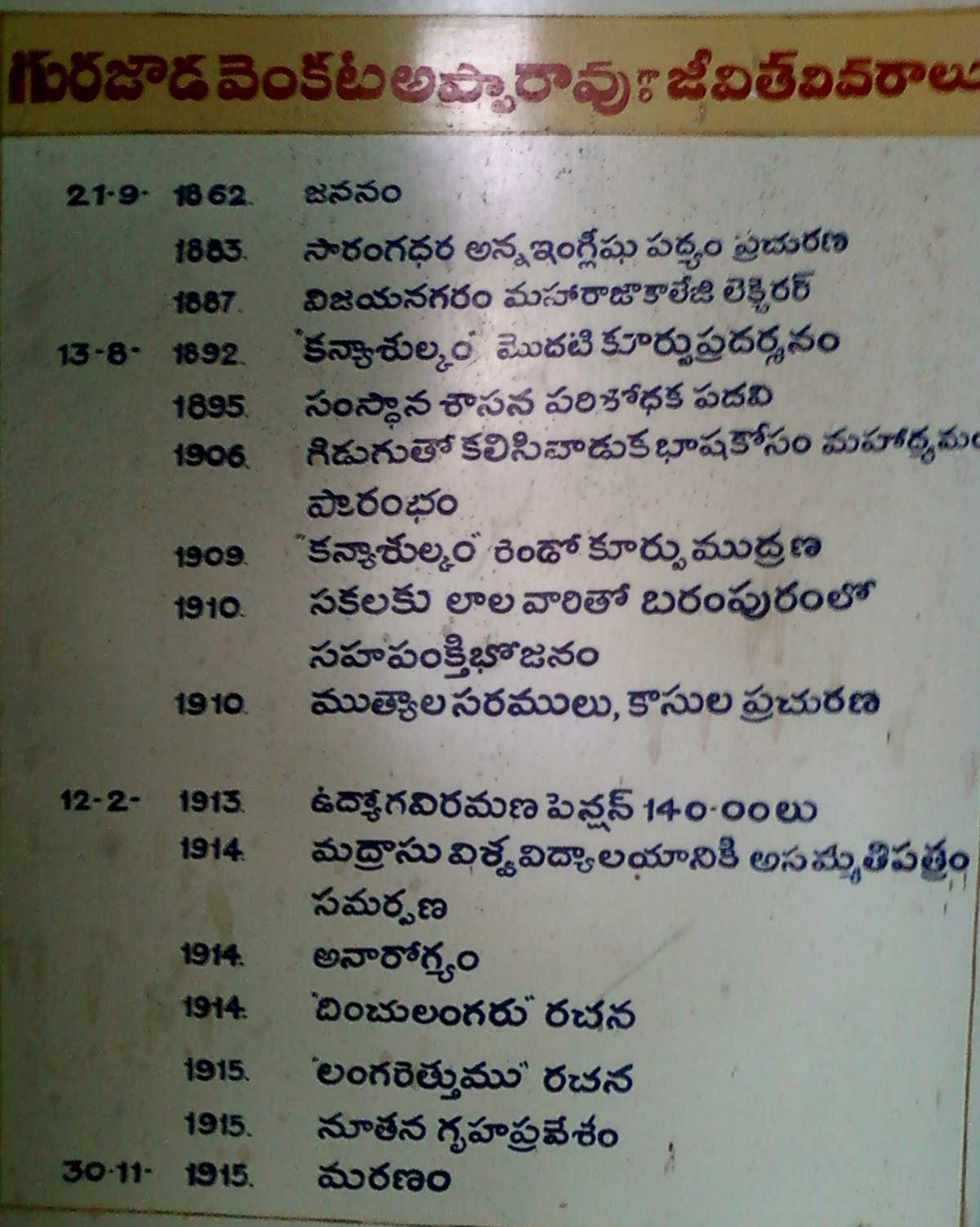
Life History of Gurajada Apparao displayed at his house, which is a memorial library now

Gurajada married Appala Narasamma in 1885. He continued his studies and graduated with B.A. (Philosophy major and Sanskrit minor) in 1886. For some period during 1886, he worked as Head Clerk in the Deputy Collector's office. On Vijayadasami day, 1887, he joined as a Lecturer (Level IV) in M.R. College with a salary of Rs.100. Around the same time, he was introduced to Maharajah Pusapati Ananda Gajapati Raju (1850–1897).

In 1905, Gurajada's mother died. In 1906, his close friend P.T. Srinivasa Iyyangar, principal of Mrs. A.V.N. College, Visakhapatnam started an association to promote curriculum reform in high schools. One of the chief aims was to introduce spoken dialects. Along with him, J.A. Yates (1874–1951) -a British civil servant, Gidugu and Gurajada were the principal members. Another friend S. Srinivasa Iyengar (1874–1941) also gave a lot of support and encouragement. Incidentally, this Srinivasa Iyengar was a well-known lawyer and was the President of AICC (All India Congress Committee) annual session at Guwahati in 1926. Gurajada's childhood friend and classmate in Chipurupalli, Gidugu Rammurty (1863–1940) was his school of thought.

== Bibliography ==
=== Other literature works ===
- The Cook (N/A. An English Poem -1882)
- Sarangadhara (In English, a long poem, (padya kavyam) -1883. {Refer a letter addressed by the Editor of Reis and Rayyet, to Gundukurti Venkataramanaiah, dated:14-8-1883)
- Chandrahasa (N/A. An English long poem, padya kavyam - Authorship and Date uncertain)
- Victoria Prasasti (English poems in praise of Queen Victoria presented to the then Viceroy of India by Maharani of Reeva -1890)
- KanyaSulkamu (Drama, First Ed. -1892, Completely revised second Ed. -1909)
- Review and Introduction in English to Sree rama vijayam and jArji dEva caritaM (both Sanskrit works -1894)
- Edited (1890s) "the Wars of Rajas, Being the History of Hande Anantapuram, Thathacharyula kathalu," both originally collected by C.P. Brown. These works were published after Gurajada's death.
- Review and introduction in English to Harischandra (An English Drama -1897)
- Minugurlu (children's story, perhaps the first in modern style -1903?)
- Kondubhatteeyam (Unfinished humorous drama -1906)
- Neelagiri patalu (Songs describing the beauty of Nilagiri hills where Gurajada recuperated from an illness -1907)
- "Madras Congress" an article by Gurajada, in The Hindu, on the 1908 Congress Party Annual Session at Madras criticizing the lack of focus, integrity and strong will to take on the British rulers, original not traceable, only Avasarala Suryarao's Telugu translation is now available. Part of the above said article, a poem parodying the session, is now available.
- "Canna kalapu cinna buddhulu," essay denouncing the superstitions associated with the appearance of Halley's Comet in 1910.
- Mutyala Saralu and Kasulu (Poems in Gurajada's own meter, matra Chandassu -1910). Many poems and short stories in modern style during the same year. These were perhaps the earliest instances of modern short stories in Telugu. Also published several essays supporting the use of vernacular as formal language. His famous patriotic song "Desamunu Preminchumanna" was written around this time.
- Bilhaneeyam (Unfinished drama, Act I -1910, Act II -1911)
- Lavanaraju kala (Poem -1911)
- Kanyaka (Poem -1912)
- Subhadra (Poem -1913)
- Visvavidyalayalu: samskrita, matru Bhashalu (Report submitted to Madras University -1914)
- Asammati patram (Minute of Dissent -report against the decision of Madras University to retain classical language as the platform for curriculum development -1914)
- Dimcu langaru (Poem -1914)
- Langarettumu (Poem -1915)
- "Sree gurajada appa ravu gari Daireelu," Collected dairies of Gurajada published many decades after Gurajada's death. Editor: Burra Seshagiri Rao
- 'Gurujadalu', complete works of Gurajada (Mahakavi Gurajada Sarvalabhya Rachanala Samkalanam); Editors:Sri Pennepalli Gopalakrishna, Dr Kalidasu Purushotham and Sri Mannem Rayudu, Published by MANASU Foundation, Hyderabad. First Edition: 21 September 2012.
- "Subject For An Extravaganza" An English Poem by Gurajada, published in 'Vijaya' magazine by Ramadasu Pantulu around 1940.
