= Beta (film) =

1992 Indian film by Indra Kumar

- Theatrical release poster
- Directed by: Indra Kumar
- Written by: Kamlesh Pandey (dialogues); Naushir Khatau
- Screenplay by: Gyandev Agnihotri; Rajiv Kaul; Praful Parekh
- Story by: K. Bhagyaraj
- Based on: Enga Chinna Rasa by K. Bhagyaraj
- Produced by: Indra Kumar; Ashok Thakeria
- Starring: Anil Kapoor; Madhuri Dixit; Aruna Irani
- Cinematography: Baba Azmi
- Edited by: Hussain. A.Burmawalla
- Music by: Songs: Anand–Milind; Dilip Sen–Sameer Sen; Amar–Utpal; Naresh Sharma; Background Score: Vanraj Bhatia
- Production company: Maruti International
- Distributed by: Shemaroo Entertainment
- Release date: 3 April 1992
- Running time: 172 minutes
- Country: India
- Language: Hindi
- Box office: ₹23.5 crore

Beta (Translation: Son) is a 1992 Indian Hindi drama film, directed by Indra Kumar and written by Naushir Khatau and Kamlesh Pandey. It featured Anil Kapoor, Madhuri Dixit and Aruna Irani in lead roles. The soundtrack was composed by Anand-Milind. The film was one of the Biggest Blockbusters of 1990s. The film is an official remake of the 1987 Tamil film Enga Chinna Rasa written and directed by K. Bhagyaraj.

Beta was released on 3 April 1992 and became the highest-grossing film of the year.

At the 38th Filmfare Awards, Beta received a leading 9 nominations, including Best Film, Best Director (Kumar) and Best Music Director (Anand–Milind), and won a leading 5 awards, including Best Actor (Kapoor), Best Actress (Dixit) and Best Supporting Actress (Irani).

== Plot ==
Raju (Anil Kapoor) is the only son of his wealthy land owning father Prem Chaudhary (Akash Khuranna). Raju had lost his mother at birth and feels deeply deprived of a mother's love.

On Raju's 5th birthday party, as a promised birthday gift, Prem brings home a new mother Lakshmi Devi (Aruna Irani), hoping that she will be a doting and caring mother for Raju. However, Lakshmi Devi turns out to be greedy, shrewd and cunning. She married Raju's father only for his vast fortune, money and property. Together with her brother Totaram (Anupam Kher) and his wife Mynavati (Bharati Achrekar), they conspire on how to transfer all property to Lakshmi Devi's name. However, Lakshmi Devi and Totaram are enraged when they find out that Prem's first wife had prepared a will before her death transferring all property to Raju, and that Prem is only a trustee to all the wealth. In the will, it has been written that Raju will have full control of his property only after marriage and unless his wife jointly consents with him, he will not be able to transfer his wealth and property to another name.

Lakshmi Devi begins her vile schemes. On the front, she puts up an act of being a very loving mother for Raju, who exhilarated for a mother's love, becomes a devoted son. He showers Lakshmi Devi with love and respect, ever-ready to obey her every word. In the process, unknowingly, he allows Lakshmi Devi to manipulate him. She very cunningly misleads Raju to give up his education. When his father finds out that Raju stopped going to school at Lakshmi Devi's instructions, he called out to her to question her. Lakshmi Devi and Totaram, hearing Prem, pours oil on the steps causing him to fall down the flight of stairs and hurting his head severely. Using this opportunity, they prove that Prem has become mentally unstable and they lock him up in a corner room of the house.

Raju being naïve and uneducated, believes every word of his step-mother and her brother. Over the years, Lakshmi Devi increasingly isolates his aging father from the family and mainly Raju.

One day, Raju meets Saraswati (Madhuri Dixit) at a wedding and falls head over heels in love with her. After some pursuing and an intense incident in her village, Raju and Saraswati get married. In the meantime, Lakshmi Devi fixes an alliance for Raju with an equally uneducated girl from their own village, so that she too can be manipulated and can finally succeed in transferring the property in Lakshmi Devi and her son, Ramesh (Adi Irani), Raju's step brother's name.

Lakshmi Devi is shocked to learn about Raju and Saraswati's marriage as Lakshmi Devi knows that Saraswati was not only educated but also a very intelligent girl. As usual, Lakshmi Devi puts on an act of a doting mother in front of Saraswati. But Saraswati soon discovers that Lakshmi Devi, Totaram, Mainavati, Ramesh and his wife Kunika (Kunika) are all scammers and that their love for Raju is only a ruse. She challenges to expose their deceit to Raju.

First thing, Saraswati takes Prem to the temple thus releasing him from the confined room of 20 years. This bold step of Saraswati antagonises Lakshmi Devi. Lakshmi Devi clearly disapproves of her guts. But Saraswati successfully proves to all that his father was normal. Initially, Saraswati had to bear the brunt of Raju's anger when she tried to convince him of his mother's conniving intentions. After which, Saraswati cleverly exposed every one who had been cheating Raju over the years. For every attempt of Lakshmi Devi's schemes, Saraswati wittingly plays and backfires their plans ensuring that Raju gets the message without being offended.

In one incident, Saraswati, along with Prem and their faithful servants Pandu (Lakshmi Devikant Berde) and Champa (Priya Arun), planned for Lakshmi Devi to slip and fall, forcing her to be bedridden. Promptly, the responsibility of the entire household is handed over to Saraswati. Lakshmi Devi is infuriated and plots to get rid of Saraswati just for rewards.

When Saraswati becomes pregnant, her father, Shyamlal (Satyen Kappu) comes home with hoards of sweets for her in-laws and a box of saffron. He requests that a pinch of saffron be mixed with milk and be given to Saraswati. Lakshmi Devi, adds poison to the box of saffron. She prepares the milk and tells the unaware Raju to give Saraswati the milk along with a pinch of the poisoned saffron. Champa, who witnessed Lakshmi Devi mixing the poison, runs to Saraswati's rescue, narrating everything that happened and warns her against drinking the poisoned milk. A devastated Saraswati informs Raju the same. But blinded by Lakshmi Devi's love, Raju not only refuses to believe her, he even accuses her of conspiring stories against his mother. In defense, Raju drinks the poisoned milk to prove to Saraswati her error. Raju's world comes crumbling down when he coughed up blood.

He, then recollects and realises that everything he had heard about Lakshmi Devi all these years from others were eventually true. Yet, Raju cannot bring himself to hate Lakshmi Devi. His words to Lakshmi Devi before dying touched her deeply. Lakshmi Devi repented that her greed for wealth stretched a bit too far this time to the point of killing a son who had loved her with a true heart.

Saraswati, in the meantime, rushes to get a doctor. On returning she is told that if she wants Raju alive she will have to sign the property transfer papers. Saraswati agrees immediately. However, Lakshmi Devi forbids Saraswati from signing it and apologizes to her. A fight ensues between Lakshmi Devi and Ramesh. Totaram and Mynavati also joins with Ramesh. Ultimately, it required Raju himself to come forward to save Lakshmi Devi from being killed by Ramesh.

Eventually Raju recovers and hands over the signed property papers to Prem. He bids good-bye to his father, Pandu and Champa. He boards the vehicle with Saraswati to leave his home for good, when Lakshmi Devi begs him not to leave. To prove her remorse she rips up the papers and tells him that all she wants is nothing more than "her son". The family is happily reconciled.

== Cast ==
- Anil Kapoor as Rajnath "Raju"
- Madhuri Dixit as Saraswati "Saru"
- Aruna Irani as Laxmi
- Laxmikant Berde as Pandu Dhondu Bikajirao
- Anupam Kher as Totaram
- Priya Arun as Champa
- Akash Khurana as Premnath
- Kunickaa Sadanand as Kunika
- Adi Irani as Ramesh
- Bharati Achrekar as Mainavati
- Rajeev Mehta as Groom
- Jack Gaud as Namdev
- Harjeet Walia as the officer who came to arrest Ramesh

== Soundtrack ==
The soundtrack of Beta was the second-best selling album of the year. Anand–Milind were nominated for the Filmfare Award for Best Music Director, but lost out to Nadeem-Shravan for Deewana. Music directors Dilip Sen–Sameer Sen, Amar-Utpal and Naresh Sharma's compositions are included in the album but not in the film, nor are they credited in the film titles. Anuradha Paudwal won her third consecutive Filmfare Award for Best Female Playback Singer for the song Dhak Dhak Karne Laga based on Telugu song "Abbanee Teeyani" from Jagadeka Veerudu Athiloka Sundari, composed by Ilayaraja.

Audio is available on T-Series.

No.	Title	Lyrics	Music	Singer(s)	Length
1.	"Dhak Dhak Karne Laga" (Originally composed by Ilaiyaraaja; Raga Shivaranjani)	Sameer	Anand-Milind	Udit Narayan, Anuradha Paudwal	05:20
2.	"Koyal Se Teri Boli" (Originally composed by Shankar–Ganesh)	Sameer	Anand-Milind	Udit Narayan, Anuradha Paudwal	05:420
3.	"Saiyan Ji Se Chupke"	Sameer	Anand-Milind	Udit Narayan, Anuradha Paudwal	07:30
4.	"Sajna Main Teri"	Sameer	Anand-Milind	Anuradha Paudwal, Vipin Sachdeva	07:14
5.	"Dhadkane Saansein Jawani"	Dilip Tahir	Dilip Sen – Sameer Sen	Pankaj Udhas, Anuradha Paudwal	05:20
6.	"Yeh Do Dil Hain Chanchal"	Naqsh Lyallpuri.	Amar-Utpal	Babla Mehta, Anuradha Paudwal	06:52
7.	"Bhool To Maa Se"	Sameer	Anand-Milind	Udit Narayan	02:17
8.	"Kushiyon Ka Din Aaya Hai"	Sameer	Anand-Milind	Anuradha Paudwal	05:57
9.	"Kitna Pyara Yeh Chehra"	Dev Kohli	Naresh Sharma	Anuradha Paudwal, Indrajeet	04:40
10.	"Nach Mudiya"	Dev Kohli	Naresh Sharma	Anuradha Paudwal, Vipin Sachdeva	06:48

== Awards ==
38th Filmfare Awards:

Won

- Best Actor – Anil Kapoor
- Best Actress – Madhuri Dixit
- Best Supporting Actress – Aruna Irani
- Best Female Playback Singer – Anuradha Paudwal for "Dhak Dhak Karne Laga"
- Best Choreography – Saroj Khan for "Dhak Dhak Karne Laga"

Nominated

- Best Film – Indra Kumar, Ashok Thakeria
- Best Director – Indra Kumar
- Best Comedian – Laxmikant Berde
- Best Music Director – Anand–Milind
