= P. Pullayya =

Indian film director

- Born: 2 May 1911; Nellore, Madras Presidency, British India
- Died: 1985 (aged 73–74)
- Occupations: Film Director; Film Producer
- Spouse: Santha Kumari (m. 1937)

P. Pullayya (also spelled P. Pullaiya; 1911–1985) was an Indian film director and producer known for his work in Telugu films. He received the Raghupathi Venkaiah Award for his contributions to Telugu cinema. He also directed several Tamil films and a Kannada film.

== Personal life ==
Pullayya married veteran actress Santha Kumari in 1937. Together they have two daughters named, Padmavathi and Radha

== Film career ==
Pullayya produced and directed many successful films under the banner Padmasree Pictures named after their daughter.

Jayabheri was a 1959 Telugu musical hit film directed by him and starring Akkineni Nageswara Rao and Anjali Devi in lead roles. The film is based on the 1947 production by V. Shantaram, titled Lokshahir Ram Joshi in Marathi and Matwala Shayar Ram Joshi in Hindi. The songs in the movie are both classical Carnatic and folklore with music composed by Pendyala Nageswara Rao.

Sri Venkateswara Mahatyam was a 1960 magnum opus Telugu film produced and directed by him and starring N. T. Rama Rao. The story is based on the story of Lord Venkateswara.

== Filmography ==
Year	Title	Credited as		Language	Notes
Year	Title	Director	Producer	Language	Notes
1935	Harischandra	Assistant		Telugu	
1937	Sarangadhara	Yes		Telugu	
1939	Balaji	Yes		Telugu	
1941	Dharmapatni	Yes	Yes	Telugu	
1941	Premabandhan	Yes		Telugu	
1941	Subhadra	Yes		Kannada	
1943	Bhagyalakshmi	Yes		Telugu	
1945	Maya Machhindra	Yes		Telugu	
1948	Bhaktha Jana	Yes		Telugu	
1950	Macha Rekai	Yes		Tamil	
1950	Tirugubatu	Yes		Telugu	
1950	Veetukari	Yes		Tamil	
1952	Dharma Devatha	Yes		Tamil; Telugu	
1953	Manam Pola Mangalyam	Yes		Tamil	
1954	Rechukka	Yes		Telugu	
1955	Kanyasulkam	Yes		Telugu	
1955	Ardhangi	Yes	Yes	Telugu	
1956	Pennin Perumai	Yes	Yes	Tamil	
1956	Uma Sundari	Yes		Telugu	
1957	Vanangamudi	Yes		Tamil	
1958	Illarame Nallaram	Yes		Tamil	
1958	Athisaya Thirudan	Yes		Tamil	
1959	Jayabheri	Yes		Telugu	
1959	Kalaivaanan	Yes		Tamil	
1959	Banda Ramudu	Yes		Telugu	
1960	Sri Venkateswara Mahatyam	Yes	Yes	Telugu	
1962	Siri Sampadalu	Yes	Yes	Telugu	
1964	Murali Krishna	Yes		Telugu	
1965	Aasai Mugam	Yes		Tamil	
1965	Preminchi Choodu	Yes	Yes	Telugu	
1966	Thaaye Unakkaga	Yes		Tamil	
1967	Prana Mithrulu	Yes	Yes	Telugu	
1970	Alludu Menalludu	Yes	Yes	Telugu	
1972	Koduku Kodalu	Yes	Yes	Telugu	
1976	Andharu Bagundali	Yes		Telugu	

== Awards ==
National Film Awards

- 1955: Certificate of Merit for Best Feature Film in Telugu - Ardhangi
- 1959: Certificate of Merit for Best Feature Film in Telugu - Jayabheri
- 1962: Certificate of Merit for the Third Best Feature Film in Telugu - Siri Sampadalu

Nandi Awards

- Raghupathi Venkaiah Award - 1981

== See also ==
- Raghupathi Venkaiah Award
