= Santha Kumari =

Indian musician and actress (1920–2006)

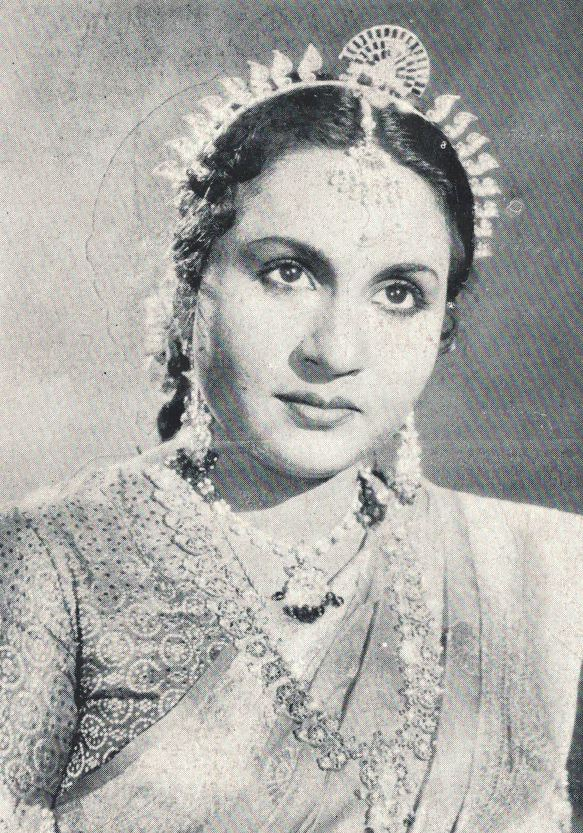
- Shanthakumari (1949)
- Born: Vellala Subbamma; 17 May 1920; Proddatur, Kadapa District, Andhra Pradesh, India
- Died: 16 January 2006 (aged 85)
- Occupation: Actress
- Years active: 1936-1979
- Spouse: P. Pullayya (m. 1937; died 1985)

Santha Kumari (born Vellaala Subbamma; 17 May 1920 – 16 January 2006) was an Indian musical artist and actress. She was married to the Telugu film director and producer P. Pullayya.

== Early years ==
Vellaala Subbamma was born in Proddatur town, (Kadapa District, Andhra Pradesh) to Sreenivasa Rao and Pedda Narasamma. Her father was an actor and her mother a classical music singer. Santhakumari learned classical music and violin under the guidance of Professor P. Sambamurthy and was a junior to D. K. Pattammal. She joined a drama troupe and was an AIR artiste by the age of sixteen. She came to Madras (now Chennai) to pursue a career in music. She found employment in Vidyodaya School for a remuneration of Rs 2 per month. She sang along with music director S. Rajeswara Rao for AIR.

== Film career ==
P. V. Das, producer and director of Mayabazaar (also known as Sasirekhaa Parinayam) was scouting for a young girl to play Sasirekha. He saw Subbamma at a music concert. At the time, she was teaching music at Vidyodaya School, Madras. Das liked her mellifluous voice and innocence, essential qualities to portray Sasirekha's character. Her parents were against her joining films. They wanted to see her as a classical singer. Subbamma was adamant and resorted to a hunger strike. On the fourth day they relented. Das changed her name as Santhakumari. The film was released in 1936.

In the following year she was a member of the cast of Sarangadhara, a film that was directed by P. Pullayya, whom she met and married in the same year.

The couple establihed a production house named PadmaSree Pictures, after their daughter Padma, for some of their movies and had success with films such as Jayabheri (1959), Sri Venkateswara Mahatyam (1960), and Preminchi Choodu (1965). Santhakumari acted in most of the movies made by her husband, including Shavukaru (1950), Ardhangi (1955), Sri Venkateswara Mahatyam (1960), Santhi Nivasam (1960), and Ramudu Bheemudu (1964).

In 1947, the couple started the Ragini Pictures banner with Bheemavarapu Narasimha Rao and Bhakta Jana. They made 22 films under both the PadmaSree and Ragini banners put together.

She played many lead and supporting roles, with around 250 appearances in total.

== Awards and recognition ==
For her contributions to Telugu Cinema, Santha Kumari was awarded the Raghupathi Venkaiah Award in 1998.

== Filmography ==
This is partial filmography of Santha Kumari. Kindly help expanding it.

Year	Film	Role	Language	Notes
1936	Sasirekha Parinayam	Sasirekha	Telugu	
1937	Sarangadhara	Chitrangi	Telugu	Also playback singer
1938	Bhakta Jayadeva		Telugu	
1939	Balaji	Consort of Venkateswara	Telugu	Also playback singer
1941	Dharmapatni		Telugu	Also playback singer
1941	Parvati Kalyanam		Telugu	
1943	Krishna Prema	Radha	Telugu	Also playback singer
1945	Mayalokam		Telugu	Also playback singer
1948	Bhaktha Jana		Tamil	
1949	Gunasundari Katha	Rupasundari	Telugu	
1950	Shavukaru	Santhi	Telugu	Also playback singer
1952	Dharmadevata	Kathyayini	Telugu	
1952	Daasi	Parvathamma	Telugu	
1953	Velaikari Magal	Parvathamma	Tamil	
1953	Ponni		Tamil	
1955	Ardhangi		Telugu	Also playback singer
1956	Pennin Perumai	Rajeswari	Tamil	
1957	Sarangadhara	Queen Rathnangi	Telugu	
1958	Sarangadhara	Queen Rathnangi	Tamil	
1958	Bommai Kalyanam	Thangam	Tamil	
1958	Bommala Pelli		Telugu	
1959	Jayabheri	Annapoorna	Telugu	
1959	Kalaivanan	Annapoorna	Tamil	
1960	Sri Venkateswara Mahatmyam	Vakula	Telugu	
1960	Vidivelli	Chandru's Mother	Tamil	
1962	Siri Sampadalu		Telugu	
1962	Policekaran Magal		Tamil	
1964	Ramudu Bheemudu		Telugu	
1965	Preminchi Choodu		Telugu	
1967	Prana Mithrulu	Jagadamba	Telugu	
1969	Sivandha Mann	Janaki	Tamil	
1970	Akka Chellelu	Mother of Judge Ramachandra Rao	Telugu	
1970	Talla Pellamma		Telugu	
1971	Prema Nagar		Telugu	
1971	Pavitra Hrudayalu		Telugu	
1972	Koduku Kodalu		Telugu	
1972	Vasantha Maligai	Anand and Vijay's mother	Tamil	Reused scenes from Prema Nagar
1975	Piriyavidai		Tamil	Also playback singer
1976	Secretary		Telugu	
1976	Andharu Bagundali	Janakamma	Telugu	
1977	Gadusu Pillodu	Mother of Sudarshanam	Telugu	
1979	Muttaiduva		Telugu	

== See also ==
- Raghupathi Venkaiah Award
