= Padmini filmography =

Padmini acted in Tamil, Hindi, Malayalam, Telugu and Russian language films. Padmini, with her elder sister Lalitha and her younger sister Ragini, were called the "Travancore sisters". She has overall appeared in 226 films- 142 in Tamil, 37 in Hindi, 28 in Malayalam, 15 in Telugu, 2 in Sinhala and one in each Russian & French languages respectively.

== Filmography ==
=== Tamil ===
Year	Title	Role	Notes
1947	Kannika	Mohini	
1948	Vedhala Ulagam	Dancer	
1948	Mohini	Dancer	
1948	Bhojan	Dancer	
1948	Bhaktha Jana	Krishna	
1948	Adhithan Kanavu	Mohini	
1948	Mahabali		
1948	Gnana Soundari		
1948	Gokuladasi	Krishna	
1948	Geetha Gandhi	Dancer	
1949	Peralena Iranama	Dancer	
1949	Vazhkai	Dancer	
1949	Naattiya Rani	Dancer	
1949	Maayaavathi	Dancer	
1949	Mangayarkarasi	Dancer	
1949	Kanniyin Kathali	Dancer	
1949	Kanniyin Kaadhali	Dancer	
1949	Pavalakkodi		
1949	Velaikaari	Dancer	
1949	Vinothini		
1949	Deva Manohari		
1950	Manthiri Kumari	Dancer 2	
1950	Digambara Samiyar	Dancer	
1950	Vijayakumari	Dancer	
1950	Parijatham	Dancer	
1950	Marudhanaattu Ilavarasi	Dancer	
1950	Ponmudi	Dancer	
1950	Ithaya Geetham	Dancer	
1950	Krishna Vijayam	Gopika / Dancer	
1950	Ezhai Padum Padu	Lakshmi	
1951	Vanasundari	Dancer	
1951	Singari		
1951	Or Iravu	A dancer	
1951	Manamagal	Kumari	
1951	Devaki	Dancer	
1952	Velaikaran		
1952	Panam	Jeeva	
1952	Kanchana		
1952	Dharma Devathai	Narthaki	
1952	Andhaman Kaidhi	Dancer	
1952	Amarakavi	Dancer	
1953	Anbu	Malathi	
1953	Ponni	Kanmani	
1953	Marumagal	Shantha	
1953	Asai Magan	Jayanthi	
1953	Ulagam	Bharathanatyam Dancer	
1954	Thookku Thookki	Princess Madhavi	
1954	Sorgavasal	Queen Kumara Devi	
1954	Kalyanam Panniyum Brammachari	Padmini	
1954	Illara Jothi	Chithra Lekha	
1954	Edhir Paradhathu	Sumathi	
1954	Vaira Malai		
1955	Kaveri	Kavery	
1955	Kathanayaki		
1955	Mangaiyar Thilakam	Sulochana	
1955	Gotteswaran	Neela	
1955	Ellam Inba Mayam	Guest artist	
1955	Rajakumari		
1956	Raja Rani	Rani	
1956	Madurai Veeran	Velaiammai	
1956	Aasai	Sundari	
1956	Amara Deepam	Roopa	
1956	Kannin Manigal		
1956	Verum Pechu Alla		
1957	Puthaiyal	Parimalam	
1957	Baagyavathi	Meenakshi	
1957	Raja Rajan	Princess Rama	
1957	Mallika	Kamala	
1958	Uthama Puthiran	Amudhavalli	
1958	Sampoorna Ramayanam	Seethadevi	
1958	Vanjikottai Valiban	Princess Padma	
1959	Veerapandiya Kattabomman	Vellaiyammal	
1959	Thangapathumai	Selvi	
1959	Ponnu Vilayum Bhoomi	Muthamma	
1959	Maragatham	Maragatham / Alamu	
1959	Daivame Thunai		
1960	Raja Desingu	Ayisha	
1960	Raja Bakthi	Princess Sarojini	
1960	Petra Manam		
1960	Meenda Sorgam	Nirmala	
1960	Mannadhi Mannan	Chithra	
1960	Deivapiravi	Thangam	
1960	Rickshaw Rangan		
1960	Baghdad Thirudan	Dancer	
1961	Sri Valli	Valli	
1961	Punar Jenmam	Parvathi	
1961	Arasilangkumari	Anbukarasi	
1962	Senthamarai	Senthamarai	
1962	Rani Samyuktha	Samyukta	
1962	Meri Bahen		
1962	Vikramaadhithan	Princess Ratnamalai	
1963	Naan Vanangum Daivam	Rukmani	
1963	Veera Dalapathi Veluthambi		
1963	Kattu Roja	Ponni	
1964	Veeranganai		
1965	Nartaki Chitra		
1966	Thaaye Unakkaga	Devi	
1966	Saraswathi Sabatham	Devi Maha Parvathi 'Shakti'	
1966	Chitthi	Meenakshi	
1967	Thiruvarutchelvar	Dancer	
1967	Pesum Daivam	Lakshmi	
1967	Paladai	Janaki	
1967	Iru Malargal	Uma	
1967	Engalukkum Kalam Varum		
1967	1967 Nil N S Krishnan		
1967	Kan Kanda Deivam	Annam	
1968	Thillana Mohanambal	"Thillana" Mohanambal	
1968	Thirumal Perumai	Deva Devi	
1968	Kuzhanthaikkaga	Gowri	Remade in Hindi as Nanha Farishta
1969	Gurudhatchanai	Devaki	
1970	Ethirkalam	Mangamma	
1970	Vilaiyattu Pillai	Maragatham	
1970	Vietnam Veedu	Savitri	
1970	Raman Ethanai Ramanadi	Guest appearance	
1970	Penn Deivam	Ponnamma	
1970	Kumara Sambhavam	Parvathi / Sathi	
1971	Rickshawkaran	Parvathi	
1971	Annai Velankanni	Swarnam	
1971	Thirumagal	Kalyani	
1971	Therottam	Kanakam	
1971	Thenum Paalum	Janaki	
1971	Kulama Gunama	Seetha	
1971	Iru Thuruvam	Thangam	
1971	Aathi Parasakthi	Meenakshi, Vishalakshi, Kamakshi, Karumariamman and Durga	Dubbed in Hindi as Jai Jagat Janani
1972	Rani Yaar Kuzhanthai		
1972	Appa Tata		
1973	Dheiva Kuzhandhaigal		
1974	Thayi		
1974	Devi Shri Kaumariamman		
1974	Appa Amma		
1975	Baaghi Lutera		
1975	Oru Kudumbathin Kadhai		
1976	Uzhaikum Karangal		
1977	Dheepam	Raja	
1977	Navarathnam		
1979	Ore Vaanam Ore Bhoomi		
1985	Poove Poochudava	Pungavanathama	
1986	Thaikku Oru Thalattu	Dhanam	
1986	Lakshmi Vanthachu	Rajeswari	
1986	Aayiram Kannudayaal	Abhirami	
1986	Cinema Cinema	Herself	

=== Hindi ===
Year	Title	Role	Notes
1948	Kalpana	Dancer	
1951	Jeevan Tara		
1952	Mr. Sampat	Malini Devi	
1955	Shiv Bhakta	Rani	
1957	Pardesi	Lakshmi	Indian-Soviet film. Released in Russian as Journey Beyond Three Seas
1957	Qaidi		
1957	Payal	Kamla	
1958	Sitamgar		
1958	Raagini	Sitara Devi	
1958	Mujrim	Dancer dressed as man	In song "Heeriye, Soniye"
1958	Amar Deep	Roopa	
1959	Raj Tilak	Princess Bathma	
1959	Amar Shaheed		
1960	Singapore	Lata	
1960	Kalpana	Kalpana	
1960	Jis Desh Men Ganga Behti Hai	Kammo	
1960	Bindiya	Bindya 'Bindu'	
1960	Aai Phirse Bahar		
1960	Maya Machhindra		
1960	Ramayan		
1961	Apsara		
1962	Aashiq	Priti	
1965	Shahir		
1965	Mahabharat	Draupadi / Sairantri	
1965	Kaajal	Bhanu Saxena	
1965	Saptarshi		
1966	Afsana	Renu	
1967	Aurat	Parvati	
1968	Vaasna	Lakshmi K. Chander	
1969	Madhavi	Rajkumari Mangala V Singh	
1969	Nannha Farishta	Gauri	
1969	Chanda Aur Bijli	Bijli	
1969	Bhai Bahen	Rani / Tara	
1970	Mastana	Gauri	
1970	Mera Naam Joker	Meena / Meena Banu Bochali / Master Meenu	
1970	Aansoo Aur Muskan	Mary	
1982	Dard Ka Rishta	Anuradha's mother	

=== Malayalam ===
Year	Title	Role	Notes
1950	Prasanna	Madanika	
1950	Chandrika	Dancer	
1951	Rakthabandham	Lalitha	
1952	Kanchana	Bhanumathi	
1952	Amma	Dancer	
1953	Aashadeepam	Jayanthi	
1954	Snehaseema	Omana	
1957	Sakunthala		
1959	Minnalpadayali		
1959	Chathurangam		
1961	Ummini Thanka	Thanka	
1962	Sabarimala Sree Ayyappan	Mohini/Mahavishnu	
1964	Devalayam		
1964	Kanakachilanga		
1968	Aparadhini		
1968	Adhyapika	Saramma	
1969	Kumara Sambhavam	Sathi / Parvathi	
1969	Sandhya		
1970	Vivahitha	Meena	
1970	Sabarimala Sree Dharma Sastha		
1971	Rathrivandi		
1979	Ezham Kadalinakkare	Doctor	
1984	Sabarimala Darshanam		
1984	Nokkethadhoorathu Kannum Nattu	Kunjoonjamma Thomas	
1989	Gurudevan	Parvathy	
1991	Vasthuhara	Bhavani	
1994	Paamaram		
1994	Dollar	Ammachi	

=== Telugu ===
Year	Title	Role	Notes
1949	Laila Majnu	Dancer	
1950	Jeevitham	Dancer	
1950	Beedala Patlu	Lakshmi	
1950	Tirugubatu	Dancer	
1951	Chandravanka	Dancer	
1951	Navvite Navaratnalu	Dancer	
1952	Kanchana	Bhanumathi	
1952	Dharma Devatha	Narthaki	
1953	Ammalakkalu	Usha	
1953	Oka Talli Pillalu		
1954	Amara Sandhesam	Raja Narthaki	
1955	Vijaya Gauri		
1959	Sampoorna Ramayanam	Sita	
1966	Mohini Bhasmasura	Mohini	
1967	Vasantha Sena	Anaga Sena	

=== Sinhala ===
Year	Title	Role	Notes
1948	Kapati Arakshakaya		Choreography only
1957	Surasena		

=== Russian ===
Year	Title	Role	Notes
1957	Khozhdenie Za Tri Morya	Lakshmi	

=== French ===
Year	Film	Role	Notes
1969	Things Seen in Madras 1969 - L' Inde Fantôme - Phantom India	Film actress/Herself	Documentary

=== TV series ===
Year	Title	Role	Notes
1980's	Unknown serial by Manobala	Actress	Produced by Kutty Padmini
1994	Aadhar Shila	Actress	Hindi Serial DD Metro Channel
	Ninaivu Kurippugal	Host	
2002	American Dreams	Parvathyamma	Asianet Channel
2004	Thaka Thimi Tha	Guest	Jaya TV
	Samagamam	Guest	Amrita TV

=== Dramas ===
- Ramayana
- Kalpana
- Valli
- Kannaki
- Dashavatharam
- Sri Krishna Leela
- Parijata Pushpaharanam
