= Azaad (1955 film) =

- Poster
- Directed by: S. M. Sriramulu Naidu
- Screenplay by: Rajendra Krishan
- Story by: Venkatarama Ramalingam Pillai
- Produced by: S. M. Sriramulu Naidu
- Starring: Dilip Kumar; Meena Kumari
- Cinematography: Sailen Bose
- Edited by: Veluswamy
- Music by: C. Ramchandra
- Production company: Pakshiraja Studios
- Distributed by: Pakshiraja Studios
- Release date: 1 July 1955
- Running time: 151 mins
- Country: India
- Language: Hindi

Azaad (transl. Free) is a 1955 Indian Hindi-language action comedy film produced and directed by S. M. Sriramulu Naidu. It was a remake of his own Tamil film Malaikkallan (1954), which had M. G. Ramachandran and P. Bhanumathi playing the lead roles.

== Plot ==
After her widower father, Kedarnath, passes away, Shobha goes to live with her father's friend Charandas and his wife Shanta, who had their son go missing as a child. Years later, Shobha is now matured and Charandas scouts for a suitable groom. A wealthy man, Sundar, would like to marry Shobha, but the family detests him. Then one night Shobha is abducted. The Police are informed but their search is in vain. A few days later, they get wind that Shobha may be in Sundar's custody, and a search proves to be in vain. Then Shobha returns home and tells them that she was rescued by a wealthy man named Azaad, housed in a mansion, looked after very well and brought back home all in one piece. They subsequently find out that the wealthy man is none other than a notorious bandit named Azaad. They are even more shocked when Shobha informs them that she wants to marry Azaad. Will Charandas and Shanta permit her to marry a bandit?

== Cast ==
- Dilip Kumar as Kumar / Azaad / Abdul Rahim Khan
- Meena Kumari as Shobha
- Om Prakash as Head Constable Motilal
- Pran as Sundar
- Raj Mehra as Sub Inspector
- Randhir as Kedarnath
- Badri Prasad as Charandas
- Achala Sachdev as Shanta
- Shammi as Janki
- S. Nazir as Chandar
- Murad as Jagirdar
- Ramesh Sinha as Azaad's Man
- Balam as Azaad's Man
- Nissar as Azaad's Man
- Deepa as Paro
- Sayee as Chanda
- Subbulakshmi as Gopi

== Soundtrack ==
The music was composed by C. Ramchandra and the songs were written by Rajendra Krishna. According to author, musicologist and film critic Rajesh Subramanian, Naushad was first offered to compose the songs. He refused when Naidu insisted that the songs had to be composed in a month. Hence, C. Ramchandra was signed on and the melodies were composed in record time. According to a book published by Raju Bharatan, Naidu requested Naushad to compose ten tunes within 30 days, for which he would get his "due payment". To this, Naushad purportedly said: "Naidusaab, yeh koi baniye ki dukaan samjha aapne? Ek gaana nahi milega aapko tees din main". (Naidusaab, do you think this is a baniya store? You will not get even one song in 30 days).

Song	Singer	Raga
"Na Bole, Na Bole Re"	Lata Mangeshkar	Bageshri
"Ja Ri O Kari Badariya"	Lata Mangeshkar	
"Dekho Ji Bahaar Aayi"	Lata Mangeshkar	
"Peeke Daras Ko Taras"	Lata Mangeshkar	
"Kitni Jawan Hai Raat"	Lata Mangeshkar	
"Kitna Haseen Hai Mausam, Kitna Haseen Safar Hai"	Lata Mangeshkar, C. Ramchandra	Darbari Kanada
"Baliye O Baliye, Chal Chhaliye"	Lata Mangeshkar, Usha Mangeshkar	
"Aplam Chaplam Chaplayi Re"	Lata Mangeshkar, Usha Mangeshkar	
"Marna Bhi Mohabbat Mein"	Raghunath Jadhav	

== Reception ==
Like the original, Azaad opened to terrific response and emerged a blockbuster at the box office, especially given the lavish scale it was shot on and highly popular songs, such as "Aplam Chaplam" and "Baliye O Baliye, Chal Chhaliye". It was shown at Bombay's popular Minerva theatre for 36 weeks and in Kolkata's famous Paradise cinema for 40 weeks.

Dilip Kumar received praise from audience as well as critics for his excellent comic timing and earned his second Filmfare Award for Best Actor.
