= Vimala (film) =

- Poster
- Directed by: S. M. Sriramulu Naidu
- Written by: Muddu Krishna (dialogues)
- Screenplay by: S. M. Sriramulu Naidu
- Story by: Based on Frank Barrett's novel The Daughter of the Condemned
- Produced by: S. M. Sriramulu Naidu
- Starring: N. T. Rama Rao; Savitri
- Cinematography: Sailen Boss
- Edited by: Veelu Swamy
- Music by: S. M. Subbaiah Naidu
- Production company: Pakshiraja Studios
- Release date: 11 August 1960
- Running time: 168 minutes
- Country: India
- Language: Telugu

Vimala is a 1960 Indian Telugu-language film produced and directed by S. M. Sriramulu Naidu under Pakshiraja Studios banner. The film stars N. T. Rama Rao and Savitri, with the latter playing the title role of Vimala. The music is composed by S. M. Subbaiah Naidu. The story is an adaptation of Karunkuyil Kunrathu Kolai by T. S. D. Sami.But it is loosely based on The English novel 'The Daughter of the Condemned' by Frank Barrett. The film's Tamil version Maragatham starring Sivaji Ganesan and Padmini produced under the same banner was released a year earlier.

== Cast ==
- Savitri as Vimala / Lalitha Kumari
- N. T. Rama Rao as Vijay Kumar / Gopalam
- Gummadi as Rajeswara Prasad / Anathaiah
- Rajanala as Ugra Simha
- Relangi as Butler
- Ramana Reddy as Venkatappaiah
- K. V. S. Sarma as Appalaraya Bahadoor
- Malladi as Chidananda Swamy
- Vengalli as Viswam
- M. S. Rao as C.I.D. Inspector
- Seshagiri as Berri Shetty
- Suryakantham as Manikyamba
- Rushyendramani as Anjana Devi
- Sandhya as Rajyalakshmi Devi
- Saraswathi as Chandrika
- Balakumari as Chamanti
- Sujatha as Gowri

== Soundtrack ==
Music composed by S. M. Subbaiah Naidu. Lyrics were written by Muddu Krishna.

Song title	Singers	Length
"Kannula veluge"	Ghantasala, Radha Jayalakshmi	6:29
"Neeli Vennela"	Radha Jayalakshmi	4:07
"Kannullo Nee Bomma Choodu"	Ghantasala, Radha Jayalakshmi	3:14
"Chinni Latavole"	K. Jamuna Rani, A. P. Komala	2:52
"Erra Erranidana"	Madhavapeddi Satyam, A. P. Komala	2:38
"Kaavaave Amma"	Radha Jayalakshmi	3:06
"Takkari Daana"	Pithapuram, K. Jamuna Rani	3:41

== Reception ==
The Indian Express wrote, "The director has made capital use of Savithri in the first half of the picture to keep the spell of glamour aglow and the last stages are prolonged by a series of comic diversions".
