= Pakshiraja Studios =

Indian motion picture movie studio

- Type: Managing agency, later partnership firm
- Industry: Motion pictures
- Founded: 1945
- Defunct: 1972 (de facto)
- Headquarters: Puliakulam- Sungam Road, Ramanathapuram, Coimbatore, Tamil Nadu, India
- Key people: S. M. Sriramulu Naidu

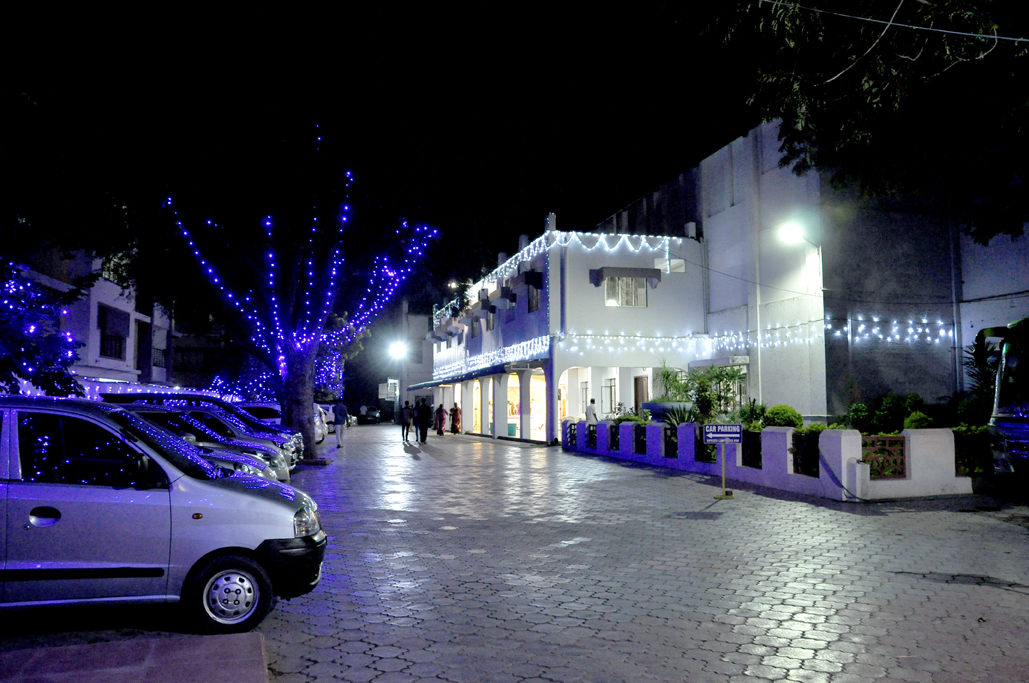
Pakshiraja Studios outside

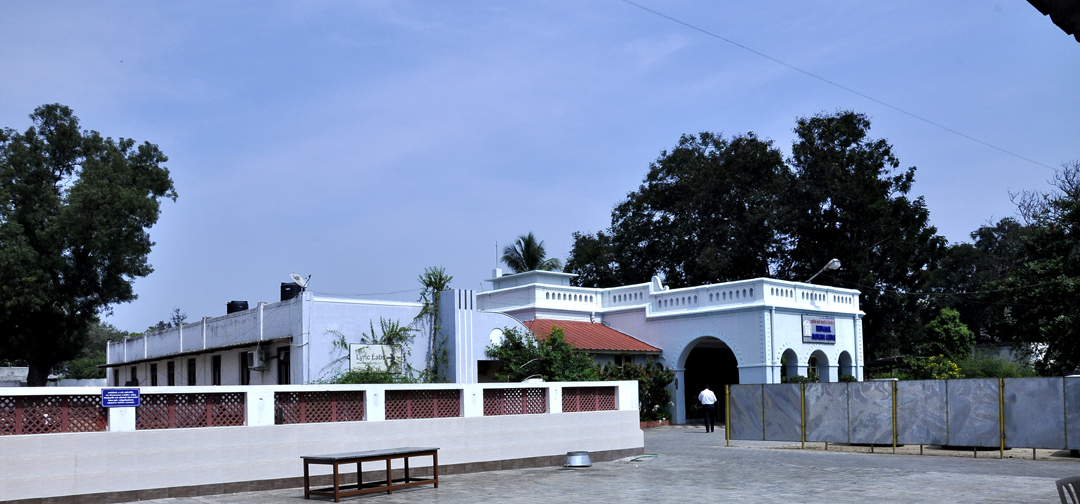
Pakshiraja Studios inside

Pakshiraja Studios was a motion picture movie studio in Coimbatore, Tamil Nadu, India, established by S. M. Sriramulu Naidu in 1945. The studio predominantly produced movies in Tamil, Telugu, Hindi and Malayalam languages, also having made one Kannada film. The studio had major releases in the 1950s and early 1960s and is well known for some blockbusters of the times.

== History ==
During the early 1930s, Coimbatore became a hub for some of the south Indian language movies, especially Tamil and Telugu, when the director Naidu and other industrialists started Central Studios. Naidu became the creative head and started making his own movies under the banner of Pakshiraja Films. By the early 1930s, another movie studio, Premier Cinetone Studio was under operation in Red Fields, Coimbatore. In 1945, Naidu left Central Studios and took over the Premier Cinetone Studio located on Puliyakulam Road, Red Fields, Coimbatore. He constructed new floors and infrastructure and made it a fully-fledged movie studio with in-house processing laboratories.

== Popular movies ==
The most popular films from that studio was Malaikkallan (1955), starring M. G. R and P. Bhanumathi, and Azaad (1955), starring Dilip Kumar and Meena Kumari, which was the highest-grossing film in Bollywood for that year, as well as Kumar and Kumari's first in lighter roles as against their tragic roles in most other movies. Malaikkallan was M. G. Ramachandran's first major box office hit, which made him a superstar.

== Present status ==
Movie production in the studio slowly declined since mid 1960s. With Central Studios going out of movie industry some time earlier and declining production at Salem Modern Theaters, Chennai has become the de facto capital for the south Indian movie industry. In 1970, Sriramulu relocated his studio facilities to establish Chamundeshwari Studios in Bangalore.

The studio premises and structures still remain more or less intact with several other establishments housed inside.

== List of movies ==
Movies listed here are partial list only.

Year	Title	Language	Cast	Director	Music composer	Others
1947	Kannika	Tamil	M. S. Sarojini, T. E. Varadan, M. R. Santhanalakshmi, D. Balasubramaniam, N. S. Krishnan, Kali N. Rathnam, T. A. Madhuram	S. M. Sriramulu Naidu	Papanasam Sivan	Story and dialogue by Elangovan
1949	Pavalakodi	Tamil	T. R. Rajakumari, T. R.Mahalingam, T. E. Varadhan, M. S. Sarojini, N. S. Krishnan, T. A. Madhuram	S. M. Sriramulu Naidu	C. R. Subburaman	Story and dialogue by Elangovan
1950	Ezhai Padum Padu	Tamil	V. Nagayya, Serukulathur Sama, T. S. Balaiah, V. Gopalakrishnan, T. S. Durairaj, Lalitha and Padmini, Kumari N. Rajam. (a.k.a. Thanjavur N. Rajalakshmi)	K. Ramnoth	S. M. Subbaiah Naidu	Lyrics by Papanasam Sivan, dialogue by Elangovan
1950	Beedala Paatlu	Telugu	V. Nagayya, Serukalathur Sama, T. S. Balaiah, V. Gopalakrishnan, T. S. Durairaj, Lalitha and Padmini, Kumari N. Rajam. (a.k.a. Thanjavur N. Rajalakshmi)	K. Ramnoth	S. M. Subbaiah Naidu	
1952	Kanchana	Tamil]	K. R. Ramasamy, Lalitha, Padmini, Duraiswamy, Miss Kumari, Aranmula Ponnamma, T. S. Durairaj	S. M. Sriramulu Naidu	S. M. Subbaiah Naidu	
1952	Kanchana	Telugu	K. R. Ramasamy, Lalitha, Padmini, Duraiswamy, Miss Kumari, Aranmula Ponnamma, T. S. Durairaj	S. M. Sriramulu Naidu	S. M. Subbaiah Naidu	
1952	Kanjana	Malayalam	K. R. Ramasamy, Lalitha, Padmini, Duraiswamy, Miss Kumari, Aranmula Ponnamma, T. S. Durairaj	S. M. Sriramulu Naidu	S. M. Subbaiah Naidu	
1952	Puratchi Veeran (dubbed from Hindi movie Badal)	Tamil	Madhubala, Prem Nath, Purnima, Agha	Amiya Chakravarty	Shankar Jaikishan	Distribution only
1953	Ponni	Tamil	Sriram, Lalitha and Padmini	A. S. A. Sami and C. S. Rao	S. M. Subbaiah Naidu	
1953	Oka Talli Pillalu	Telugu	Sriram, Lalitha and Padmini	A. S. A. Sami and C. S. Rao	S. M. Subbaiah Naidu	
1954	Malaikkallan	Tamil	M. G. Ramachandran, P. Bhanumathi	S. M. Sriramulu Naidu	S. M. Subbaiah Naidu	Story based on the novel by Namakkal Kavignar Va. Ramalingam Pillai. The movie was the first blockbuster hit for Ramachandran, establishing him as a major star.
1954	Aggi Ramudu	Telugu	N. T. Rama Rao, P. Bhanumathi, R. Nageswara Rao	S. M. Sriramulu Naidu	S. M. Subbaiah Naidu	Story based on the novel by Namakkal Kavignar Va. Ramalingam Pillai
1954	Azaad	Hindi	Dilip Kumar, Meena Kumari, Pran, Om Prakash	S. M. Sriramulu Naidu	C. Ramchandra	Story based on the novel by Namakkal Kavignar Va. Ramalingam Pillai, Hindi lyrics by Rajendra Krishen. The film was the top grossing Hindi film in the year of its release, and one of the biggest Hindi films in the 1950s.
1954	..Thaskaraveeran..	Malayalam	Thikkurisi Sukumaran Nair	S. M. Sriramulu Naidu	S. M. Subbaiah Naidu	Story based on the novel by Namakkal Kavignar Va. Ramalingam Pillai.
1957	Bettada Kalla	Kannada	Kalyan Kumar	S. M. Sriramulu Naidu	S. M. Subbaiah Naidu	Story based on the novel by Namakkal Kavignar Va. Ramalingam Pillai.
1959	Maragatham	Tamil	Sivaji Ganesan, Veenai S. Balachander, Sandhya, Padmini, T. S. Durairaj, T. S. Balaiah, J. P. Chandrababu, C. Lakshmi Rajyam	S. M. Sriramulu Naidu	S. M. Subbaiah Naidu	Dialogue by Murasoli Maran, cinematography by Sailen Bose, art direction by A. K. Sekhar
1960	Vimala	Telugu	N. T. Rama Rao, K. Savithri	S. M. Sriramulu Naidu	S. M. Subbaiah Naidu	
1961	Sabarimala Ayyappan	Malayalam		S. M. Sriramulu Naidu	S. M. Subbaiah Naidu	National Film Award for Best Feature Film in Malayalam: Certificate of Merit for Third Best Feature Film in Malayalam
1963	Kalyaniyin Kanavan	Tamil	Sivaji Ganesan, B. Saroja Devi, M. R. Radha	S. M. Sriramulu Naidu	S. M. Subbaiah Naidu	
