= Bettada Kalla =

- Directed by: S. M. Sriramulu Naidu
- Written by: Namakkal Poet
- Produced by: S. M. Sriramulu Naidu
- Starring: Kalyan Kumar; Mynavathi; R. Nagendra Rao; Udaykumar
- Cinematography: Sailen Bose
- Edited by: G. Veluswamy
- Music by: S. M. Subbaiah Naidu
- Production company: Pakshiraja Studios
- Distributed by: Pakshiraja Studios
- Release date: 1957
- Country: India
- Language: Kannada

Bettada Kalla is a 1957 Indian Kannada-language film, produced and directed by S. M. S. Naidu. The film features Kalyan Kumar, Mynavathi, R. Nagendra Rao and Udaykumar in lead roles, with a musical score composed by S. M. Subbaiah Naidu. The movie is a remake of the director's own 1954 Tamil hit Malaikkallan, which starred M.G. Ramachandran (MGR) and P. Bhanumathi in the lead roles. Bettada Kalla is notable for being the first remake in the Kannada film industry.

== Cast ==
- Kalyan Kumar
- Mynavathi
- R. Nagendra Rao
- Udaykumar
- Ganapathi Bhat
- G. V. Iyer
- H. R. Shastry
- Eshwarappa
- Manyam
- Nanjappa
- Revathi
- M. Jayashree
- Ramadevi
- Sayee
- Padmini Priyadarshini
