= Ponni (1953 film) =

- Theatrical release poster
- Directed by: A. S. A. Sami; C. Srinivasa Rao
- Screenplay by: A. S. A. Sami; Elangovan; Balasubramaniam
- Story by: A. S. A. Sami
- Produced by: S. M. Sriramulu Naidu
- Starring: Lalitha; Padmini; Sriram
- Cinematography: Sailen Bose; N. Prakash
- Edited by: Surya
- Music by: Subbiah Naidu
- Production company: Pakshiraja Studios
- Release date: 26 June 1953
- Country: India
- Language: Tamil

Ponni is a 1953 Indian Tamil-language film directed by A. S. A. Sami and C. S. Rao, starring Sriram, Lalitha and Padmini. The Telugu version Oka Talli Pillalu was released in the same year.

== Plot ==
The story is about a less privileged woman (P. Santha Kumari) left with two daughters. She loses one girl ("Baby" Chandrakumari, later Padmini), who is found by a wealthy man (D. Balasubramaniam). He changes her name to Kanmani, brings her up in luxury and she becomes proud. The struggling mother sends the other girl Ponni ("Baby" Asha, later Lalitha) to work in Kanmani's house. Kanmani ill treats her and once pushes her down the staircase, which injures Ponni badly, and she lands in hospital. The rich man has an adopted son Sundaram (Kaushik). His brother, a ne'er-do-well (Sriram), misbehaves with both Ponni and Kanmani. In the process, Ponni tries to save her sister, and lands in prison, accused of murder. However, the truth comes out and they all live happily thereafter.

== Cast ==
Cast adapted from the film titles (see external links)

Male Cast

- Sriram as Samarasam
- T. S. Durairaj as Murugan
- D. Balasubramaniam as Nallasivam Pillai
- M. L. N. Kaushik as Sundaram
- M. R. Swaminathan as Munusami
- V. M. Ezhumalai as Chokkan
- Narayana Pillai as Expert Detective
- K. S. Kannaiah as Muniyan
- T. P. Ponnusami Pillai as Tamil Pundit Ponnarangam
- Ponnaiah as Vaiyapuri

International Wrestling

- King Kong as Hungarian World Champion
- Dara Singh as India's ace wrestler
- Alireza Bey as Champion of Turkey (Referee)

Female Cast

- Lalitha as Ponni
- Padmini as Kanmani
- P. Santha Kumari as Sornam
- P. S. Gnanam as Maragatham
- K. N. Kamalam as Santhanalakshhmi
- Pachanayaki as Valli
- Baby Asha as Young Ponni
- C. R. Chandrakumari as Young Kanmani

Dance

- Ragini
- Ambika
- Sukumari

== Production ==
A. S. A. Sami was directing the film, but for reasons unknown he left half-way. C. S. Rao took over and completed it. A dance drama with the popular story of Lord Krishna which was titled Bhama Vijayam was performed by Ragini and her cousins Ambika and Sukumari. The film was shot at Pakshiraja Studios in Coimbatore. An additional attraction in the film was the real-life wrestling sequence between King Kong (Hungarian World Champion) and Dara Singh along with referee Alireza Bey (Champion of Turkey). They were performed in Park Town near Central Station.

== Soundtrack ==
The music was composed by Subbiah Naidu. Lyrics were by Narayanakavi, Ramaiah Dass, Balasubramaniam & Makkalanban.

Song	Singers	Lyrics	Length (m:ss)
"Azhagum Gunamaum Amaindha Pennukku"	Jayalakshmi		01:47
"Mazhayai Nambi Uyir Vaazhum"	C. S. Jayaraman		03:21
"Aangalai Pola Penngal"	Perianayaki		02:35
"Aaduvadhum Paaduvadhum Edhukku"	Mariappa & Group		03:12
"Paambodu Pazhagalaam Pennmani"	Jayalakshmi		03:24
"Madhimuga Radhi Ena"	Perianayaki		02:02
"Ulagam Pora Pokkile"	Loganathan & Mariappa		01:42
"Aadi Paadu Paappaa"	Jayalakshmi		01:48
"Aaduvome Oonjal Aaduvome" (Baama Vijayam dance drama)	P. A. Periyanayaki, Jayalakshmi, Radha and Komala		09:02

== Reception ==
According to historian Randor Guy, the film was an average success.
