= Malaikkallan =

1954 film by S. M. Sriramulu Naidu

- Theatrical release poster
- Directed by: S. M. Sriramulu Naidu
- Screenplay by: M. Karunanidhi
- Story by: Namakkal Kavignar
- Produced by: S. M. Sriramulu Naidu
- Starring: M. G. Ramachandran; P. Bhanumathi
- Cinematography: Sailen Bose; V Devraj Naidu
- Edited by: Veluswamy
- Music by: S. M. Subbaiah Naidu
- Production company: Pakshiraja Studios
- Release date: 22 July 1954
- Running time: 186 minutes
- Country: India
- Language: Tamil

Malaikkallan (transl. Thief of the Hills) is a 1954 Indian Tamil-language action adventure film starring M. G. Ramachandran and P. Bhanumathi. The film was released on 22 July 1954, and was a blockbuster. It ran for over 140 days in Chennai and all other major cities. It was the first Tamil film to win a President's Silver Medal.

== Plot ==
Vijayapuri, a beautiful hillside hamlet, appears serene but the truth is far from it. Dacoities, burglaries and even kidnappings are commonplace. One established perpetrator of at least some of the crimes is Kaathavarayan, his secret accomplices being some well-known public figures like the rich young wastrel Veerarajan and the Kuttipatti Zamindar.

Another dacoit is apparently the mysterious Malaikkallan. There are legends about his fabulous wealth, awe-inspiring exploits, contempt for the unprincipled rich, concern for the poor and needy. He seems to be running a veritable empire in some hidden hillock; no one has actually seen him.

There is also the wealthy merchant Abdul Raheem, who seems to disappear at regular intervals from Vijayapuri, claiming business calls at far-off places. In this hotbed of intrigue and suspicion blooms an innocent rose Poonkothai, daughter of the upright Sokkesa Mudaliar. Veerarajan is the cousin of Poonkothai and desires to marry her, but his evil reputation ensures the impossibility of such an alliance. Having lost her mother at an early age, Poonkothai is brought up by her widowed aunt Kamakshi Ammal. Kamakshi Ammal's only son Kumaraveeran went missing many years back.

Faced by stringent public criticism for their failure to tackle the audacious crimes, Sub-Inspector Arumugam arrives in Vijayapuram. But his assistant Constable Karuppiah is a bungling coward and is more a hindrance than a help in his investigations. It is at this juncture that one night when Mudaliar is away, Poonkothai is kidnapped. The happenings of that eerie night keep the village tongues wagging for many days thereafter. Two sidekicks of Kathavarayan are found tied and hanging upside down, and a piece of Poonkothai's jewellery is recovered from them. Kamakshi Ammal is found tied-up and unconscious, and a mysterious errand-boy hands over to the attending doctor a forest herb that revives her at once. Poonkothai is said to be in the custody of Malaikkallan, who has cleverly waylaid Kathavarayan's men and taken away Poonkothai. Kathavarayan faces the ire and ridicule of Veerarajan at the behest of whom he had engineered Poonkothai's kidnapping. Goaded by this humiliation, he now sends his men far and wide in search of Poonkothai. Meanwhile, Poonkothai is safe in the magnificent hideout of Malaikkallan, perceiving his genuine concern for the downtrodden and the reverence with which he is held by his people, her contempt and mistrust turn gradually into admiration and leads to love.

Several twists and turns later, the pieces of the puzzle fall in place. Kathavarayan and Veerarajan get their comeuppance. Malaikkallan and Abdul Raheem both turn out to be the same person who is the long-missing Kumaraveeran. It ends with the marriage of Poonkothai and Kumaraveeran.

== Cast ==
Cast according to the opening credits of the film

Male Cast

- M. G. Ramachandran as Malaikkallan,
  Kumaraveeran, Abdul Rahim
- Sriram as Veerarajan
- T. S. Durairaj as Head Constable Karuppaiah
- D. Balasubramaniam as Sokkesa Mudaliar
- M. G. Chakrapani as Sub Inspector Arumugam
- E. R. Sahadevan as Kathavarayan
- V. M. Ezhumalai as Satayan
- S. M. Thirupathi Sami as Kuttipatti Zamindar
- K. Duraisami as Old Malaikallan
- S. M. Subbaiah as Doctor
- Thomas & Rayappan as Police Jawans
- Kanaiah as Kannappar
- Murugesan as Bandyman
- Soundararajan, Vellingiri, Kareem, C.M.Arumugam,
  Rathnavelu as Malaikkallan's People

Female Cast

- P. Bhanumathi as Poongothai
- P. S. Gnanam as Kamakshi Ammal
- Surabhi Balasaraswathi as Janaki
- Sandhya as Chinni
- Shantha as Senkamalam
- Sayee as Alli
- Subbulakshmi as Valli

Dance

- Sayee & Subbulakshmi

== Production ==
A blend of Robin Hood and The Mark of Zorro, written by Namakkal Kavignar Va. Ramalingam Pillai (Namakkal Kavignar). Malaikkallan had been prescribed as the non-detailed text for the high school curriculum in the early 50s, and the story had become very popular. A. P. Nagarajan was initially cast as a police inspector; however, after shooting some scenes with him, Naidu chose to replace him with M. G. Chakrapani.

== Soundtrack ==
S. M. Subbiah Naidu scored the music, while the lyrics were penned by Namakkal Kavignar Ve. Ramalingam Pillai, Ku. Ma. Balasubramaniam, Thanjai N. Ramaiah Dass and Makkalanban. The song "Eththanai Kaalam Thaan Yemaatruvaar" became very popular that MGR then opted to include at least one ideological song for educational purposes in his future projects. It was the first song that T. M. Soundararajan had sung for M. G. Ramachandran. This particular song was remixed by Leon James for the film LKG (2019).

No.	Title	Singer(s)	Length
1.	"Yethanai Kaalamthan Yematruvar"	Soundararajan
2.	"Neeli Magan Nee Allava"	Periyanayaki
3.	"O Amma O Ayya"	Periyanayaki
4.	"Unnai Azhaithathu Yaaro"	P. Bhanumathi
5.	"Pengale Ulangalile"	P. Bhanumathi
6.	"Nalla Sagunam Nokki"	P. Bhanumathi
7.	"Naane Inba Roja"	P. Bhanumathi
8.	"Naalai"	P. Bhanumathi
9.	"Thamizhan Endroru Inam"	Soundararajan

== Release and reception ==
Malaikkallan was released on 22 July 1954. Tamil magazine Ananda Vikatan in its review dated 12 September 1954 mentioned that film "has several amazing moments which increase the heartbeats of the audience... Various fight scenes, dances and comedy scenes make the film a mass entertainer". The Indian Express wrote, "Obviously with an eye on the box office the picture has been plentifully interspersed with fist and sword fights and fencing displays, etc".

== Other versions ==
S. M. Sriramulu Naidu of Pakshiraja Studio in Coimbatore secured the rights to the story and decided to produce and direct a film based on it, in 5 languages apart from the original version – Tamil (Malaikkallan), Telugu (Aggi Ramudu), Malayalam (Thaskaraveeran), Kannada (Bettada Kalla), Hindi (Azaad).

== Legacy ==
The film created the trend of the concept of "Robin Hood" and inspired various films like Neelamalai Thirudan (1957), Malaiyoor Mambattiyan (1983), Gentleman (1993) and Sivaji: The Boss (2007). The film also initiated a trend of ideological songs, lip synched by lead actors.

== Awards ==
- The film won National Film Award for Best Feature Film in Tamil – President's Silver Medal in 1954 at 2nd National Film Awards.

== Bibliography ==
- Dhananjayan, G. (2014). Pride of Tamil Cinema: 1931–2013. Blue Ocean Publishers. OCLC 898765509.
