= Kanchana (1952 film) =

- Theatrical release poster in Tamil
- Directed by: S. M. Sriramulu Naidu
- Screenplay by: Manickam
- Dialogues by: Toleti G. V. Seshagiri Rao (Telugu)
- Based on: Kanchanayin Kanavu by Lakshmi
- Produced by: S. M. Sriramulu Naidu
- Starring: K. R. Ramasamy; Lalitha; Padmini; Miss Kumari; M. N. Nambiar
- Music by: S. M. Subbaiah Naidu
- Production company: Pakshiraja Studios
- Release dates: 1 May 1952; 12 June 1952 (Telugu)
- Country: India
- Languages: Tamil; Telugu; Malayalam

Kanchana (/kɑːntʃəˈnɑː/) is a 1952 Indian drama film produced and directed by S. M. Sriramulu Naidu. The film is based on the Tamil novel Kanchanayin Kanavu (transl. Kanchana's dream), authored by Lakshmi. It was filmed simultaneously in Tamil, Telugu and Malayalam languages. The film was released on 1 May 1952.

== Plot ==
Pushpanathan is the Zamindar of Mathur and Ponnammal is his widowed mother. He is persuaded by his college mate Manohar to set up a textile mill. Manohar manages to manipulate and divert Pushpanathan's wealth. He introduces Pushpanathan to Bhanumathi, a dancer in the city. Though the daughter of a prostitute, Bhanumathi leads an honorable life and falls in love with Pushpanathan.

Neelamegham Pillai, the former accountant of the Zamindari, now lives in utter poverty. His grandchildren are Kanchana and Sabeshan. Pushpanathan comes to his family's help. He becomes enamoured by Kanchana and weds her. He assures Bhanumathi that his marriage will not affect his love for her. Kanchana is ill-treated by her mother-in-law. She is heartbroken when she discovers her husband's relationship with Bhanumathi. The financial crisis caused by the establishment of the textile mill and domestic worries disturb Pushpanathan's peace of mind.

Seetha, a young lady doctor, comes to Mathur. Pushpanathan is drawn to her. But Seetha is in love with her college mate doctor Sabeshan. Kanchana burns with suspicion and jealousy. Seetha leaves Mathur to avoid Pushpanathan, who vents his anger on his wife. Kanchana leaves home and Pushpanathan does not allow Kanchana to take her son. Ponnammal gradually begins to realize the value of Kanchana. She and Bhanumati ask Pushpanathan to bring Kanchana back home. Bhanumathi dies and transfers all her wealth to Kanchana's son. The story ends with Sabeshan wedding Seetha and Pushpanathan bringing Kanchana back home.

== Cast ==
Male cast

- K. R. Ramasamy as Pushpanathan
- T. S. Dorairaj as Kondaiah
- M. N. Nambiar as Manohar
- V. Ramasharma as Doctor Prasad
- K. Duraswami as Ramadasu
- N. S. Narayana Pillai as Lawyer
- K. S. Kannaiah
- P. A. Thomas as Sabeshan

Female cast

- Lalitha as Kanchana
- Padmini as Bhanumathi
- Miss Kumari as Doctor Seetha
- M. Rushyendramani as Parvathi Bai
- M. R. Santhanalakshmi as Gangarathnam
- K. N. Kamalam as Bangaramma
- Thankam as Rita
- Kannamma as Sarasu
- Thankamma
- Aranmula Ponnamma as Ponnamma

== Production ==
Kanchana was the screen version of a popular Tamil novel Kanchanayin Kanavu, authored by Tripurasundari, popularly known by her pen name "Lakshmi". The novel serially published in the Tamil weekly Ananda Vikatan, got widespread acceptance and appreciation from the readers for the morals it conveyed. The popularity of the novel prompted Sreeramulu Naidu to produce the film based on this story. Lakshmi said while her novel was serialised in Ananda Vikatan, readers asked her whether she had actresses Lalitha and Padmini in her mind when writing the novel. Therefore, she said that when Sri Ramulu Naidu bought the rights to make the novel into a film, she requested him to cast Lalitha and Padmini in the roles.

== Soundtrack ==
There are two kritis composed by Muthuswami Dikshitar and sung by M. L. Vasanthakumari included in the film. The raga that is called Tharangini in Muthuswami Dikshitar school, is otherwise known as Charukesi. Music was composed by S. M. Subbaiah Naidu, while the lyrics were penned by Papanasam Sivan, V. A. Gopalakrishnan and Namakkal R. Balasubramaniam.

Song	Singer/s	Lyricist	Duration
"Maye Thvam Yaahi" (Raga: Tharangini)	M. L. Vasanthakumari	Muthuswami Dikshitar	02:21
"Shivakameshwari Chintaye" (Raga: Kalyani)	M. L. Vasanthakumari	Muthuswami Dikshitar	02:44
"Ullam Kavarndha En"	P. A. Periyanayaki & K. R. Ramasami		
"Etham Poattu Iraikanum"	(Radha) Jayalakshmi		03:00
"Pazhaniyappa Nin Padam" (Raga: Simhendramadhyamam)	(Radha) Jayalakshmi	Papanasam Sivan	02:50
"En Vaazhve Sogam Aaguma"	P. A. Periyanayaki		03:21
"O Aasai Rajaa"	P. A. Periyanayaki		03:07
"Inimel Orupothum"	P. A. Periyanayaki		03:15
"Azhagu Nilaa Vaa Vaa"	P. A. Periyanayaki		03:03
"Chella Kiliye Chezhundhene"	P. A. Periyanayaki		03:08
"Inba Padaginile Thunba Puyal"	P. A. Periyanayaki		03:07
"Gandhi Mahaanai Kumbiduvai"			

== Reception ==
Although the performances of Ramasami, Lalitha, Padmini and Duraiswami were praised, according to Randor Guy, Kanchana was not commercially successful in any of its versions.

== Bibliography ==
- Dhananjayan, G. (2014). Pride of Tamil Cinema: 1931–2013. Blue Ocean Publishers. OCLC 898765509.
