= Prasanna (film) =

- Directed by: S. M. Sriramulu Naidu
- Written by: Munshi Paramupillai
- Screenplay by: Munshi Paramupillai
- Produced by: Pakshiraja Studios
- Starring: Pappukutty Bhagavathar, Kottarakkara Sreedharan Nair, P. A. Thomas
- Music by: M. S. Gnanamani
- Release date: 17 August 1950
- Country: India
- Language: Malayalam

Prasanna is a 1950 Indian Malayalam-language film, directed by S. M. Sriramulu Naidu and produced by Pakshiraja Studios. The film stars Pappukutty Bhagavathar, Kottarakkara Sreedharan Nair, and P. A. Thomas in lead roles. The film's music was composed by M. S. Gnanamani. It is the debut Malayalam film of Sreeramulu Naidu, Travancore sisters Lalitha, Padmini and Ragini, playback singers M. L. Vasantha Kumari, P. A. Periyanayiki, and Radha-Jayalakshmi, and actors Kandiyoor Parameshwarankutty, P. A. Thomas, and Pappukkutty Bhagavathar.

== Cast ==
- Kottarakkara Sreedharan Nair
- Pappukutty Bhagavathar
- Kandiyoor Parameshwaran Pillai
- P. A. Thomas
- TS Bharadwaj
- Lalitha
- Padmini
- Ragini
- Kanchana
- Radhamani
