= Aggi Ramudu =

1954 film

- Theatrical release poster
- Directed by: S. M. Sriramulu Naidu
- Written by: Acharya Aatreya (dialogues)
- Screenplay by: S. M. Sriramulu Naidu
- Story by: Namakkal Ramalinga Kavignar
- Produced by: S. M. Sriramulu Naidu
- Starring: N. T. Rama Rao; Bhanumathi Ramakrishna
- Cinematography: Sailen Bose
- Edited by: Veluswamy
- Music by: S M Subbayya Naidu
- Production company: Pakshiraja Studios
- Release date: 5 August 1954
- Running time: 171 mins
- Country: India
- Language: Telugu

Aggi Ramudu (transl. Fire Ramudu) is a 1954 Telugu-language action film, produced and directed by S. M. Sriramulu Naidu. It stars N. T. Rama Rao, Bhanumathi Ramakrishna and music composed by S M Subbayya Naidu. The film was remake of Tamil as Malaikkallan (1954), with M.G. Ramachandran (MGR) and Bhanumathi in the lead roles.

== Cast ==
- N. T. Rama Rao as Aggi Ramudu / Abdul Rehman / Kumar
- Bhanumathi Ramakrishna as Sharada
- Relangi as Head Constable 441
- R. Nageswara Rao as Kaaturi Kaalayya
- Mukkamala as Sub Inspector
- Mahankali Venkayya as Mangalampalli Zamindar
- Sriram as Veerraju
- D. Balasubrahmanyam as Somanatham
- Rushyendramani as Kamakshamma
- Surabhi Balasaraswathi as Janaki
- Sandhya as Parvathi

== Soundtrack ==
Aggi Ramudu

Film score by S. M. Subbaiah Naidu
- Released: 1954
- Genre: Soundtrack
- Length: 33:45
- Producer: S. M. Subbaiah Naidu

Music was composed by S. M. Subbaiah Naidu. Lyrics were written by Acharya Aatreya. Music released by Audio Company.

S. No.	Song title	Singers	length
1	"Jai Andhra Janani"	A. M. Rajah, Radha Jayalakshmi	3:21
2	"Karunajoodavalenu"	Bhanumathi Ramakrishna	2:15
3	"Ankili cheppaledu"	Bhanumathi Ramakrishna	0:57
4	"Raraa Yasodanandana"	Radha Jayalakshmi	5:00
5	"Alluri Seetarama Raju Burra Katha"	Nazar & Party	8:13
6	"Evarura"	Bhanumathi Ramakrishna	2:43
7	"Kondaa Konalaloana"	A. M. Rajah	2:47
8	"Evaro Pilicharu"	Bhanumathi Ramakrishna	2:37
9	"Paalaveroy"	P. A. Periyanayaki	3:13
10	"Raani Raju Raani"	Bhanumathi Ramakrishna	2:19
