= Payal (film) =

- Poster
- Directed by: Joseph Thaliath Jr.
- Based on: Mallika (1957)
- Produced by: Joseph Thaliath Jr.
- Starring: Padmini; Sunil Dutt
- Music by: Hemant Kumar
- Production company: Madras Talkies
- Release date: 5 July 1957
- Country: India
- Language: Hindi

Payal is a 1957 Indian Hindi-language film, directed by Joseph Thaliath Jr. A remake of the director's own Tamil film Mallika (1957), Payal stars Padmini and Sunil Dutt in the lead roles. Baby Naaz, David, Ragini, Agha, Achala Sachdev and Meenu Mumtaz play supporting roles. The music was composed by Hemanta Mukherjee.

== Plot ==
Two sisters, Kamla and Padma, lose their parents in an air crash. The eldest daughter, Kamla, takes up the responsibility of upbringing her younger sister, who is deprived of her eyesight. In order to earn a livelihood, Kamla is forced to become a stage dancer. One day while returning home after work, she comes across a young man who lies unconscious on the road. She takes him to her home, upon which he reveals his name as Mohan (Sunil Dutt), and as the son of a rich landlord (Bipin Gupta). Mohan runs a hotel business in the city much against the will of his father.

A dejected Mohan finds solace in Kamla, and they fall in love with each other. But when he gets to know that Kamla is a stage dancer, he calls her as a prostitute. Earlier Padma had told him that Kamla was a teacher in a night school. Later, when he gets to know that Kamla has been doing this only to save money for Padma's eye operation, he reconciles with her. Mohan's father meets Kamla and extorts a promise from her that she will give up all claims on Mohan. Later, the landlord gets murdered by Shankar, his manager. Mohan is charged with the murder. In order to rescue Mohan, Kamla takes up the blame of the murder. Padma, a prime witness of the murder, undergoes an operation and regains her eyesight. She reveals the truth that Shankar was the real murderer. Shankar kills himself with a gun. Mohan's mother (Achla Sachdev) and sister (Ragini) become happy and accept Kamla.

== Cast ==
- Padmini as Kamla
- Sunil Dutt as Mohan
- Baby Naaz as Padma
- David as Shankar
- Ragini as Indira
- Bipin Gupta as Mohan's father
- Raj Mehra as Guest artist
- Achla Sachdev as Mohan's mom
- Meenu Mumtaz as Miss Dolly
- Sheoraj
- Laxman Rao as Ramu
- Agha as Vinod

Lyrics Rajender Kristen 1.jhuki jhuki ankhiyan ghayal 2

== Release ==
A contemporary review from Thought called the film a "colossal waste of talent and time". Further, it stated that Agha's comedy and Padmini's dance sequences are the only "bits" of entertainment in the film.
