= Pratibha Prahlad =

Bharata Natyam dancer, educator

Prathibha Prahlad
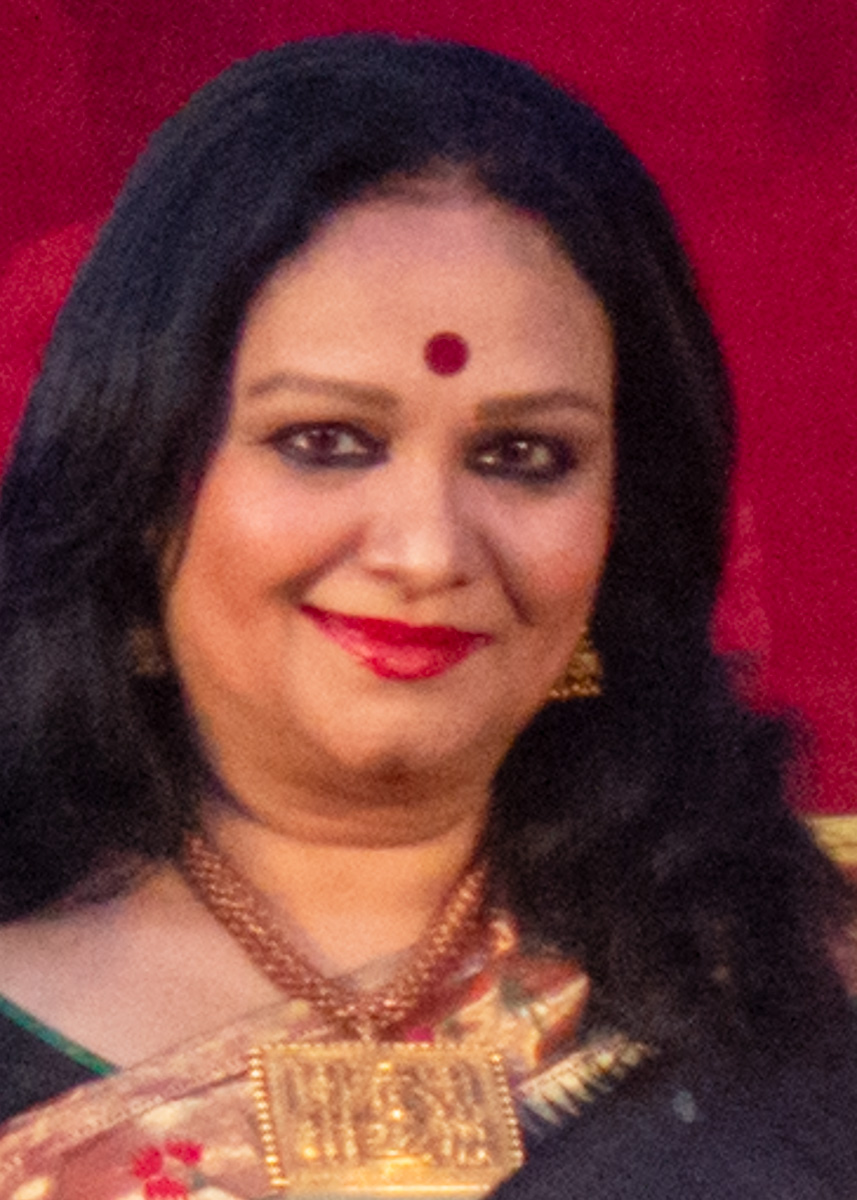

Prathibha Prahlad (b 1962) is a Bharata Natyam dancer, educator, choreographer, arts administrator, and author. She was the founder director of the Delhi International Arts Festival.

== Personal life ==
Prathibha Prahlad was born on January 29, 1962, in Mysuru, India. Prahlad's passion for dance allegedly began at the age of four which encouraged her to first join her neighbor's dance class between ages four and eight. She began her dance journey without any formal training but with the support of her parents who realized her talent and encouraged her. She had her early training in dance under U.S Krishna Rao, Kalanidhi Narayanan and V.S. Muthuswamy Pillai and in Kuchipudi under Vempatti Chinna Satya. By the time she was 20, she was an established professional dancer. Her career has taken her to platforms all over India and to festivals in over 50 countries.

Prahlad has a post-graduate degree in Mass Communications and has contributed articles to newspapers as well as producing, directing and acting in television serials. She has also authored books on dance and related subjects. Prahlad's book on Bharatnatyam was the number 2 bestseller for 10 years on Amazon after publishing and it has been reprinted various times. She is also a highly respected speaker at TEDx and many more memorial talks at educational institutions.

== Contributions ==
Prahlad founded both the Prasiddha Foundation and the Forum For Art Beyond Borders. She is artistic director and choreographer for the Prasiddha Dance Repertory and founder director of the Delhi International Arts Festival. She has sat on several government cultural committees and was the convener of the Culture Committee of the Commonwealth Games 2010 that designed the opening and closing ceremonies of the Games.

== Awards and titles ==
The Government of India awarded her the Padma Shri in 2016. She is also the recipient of the Central Sangeet Natak Akademi Award for dance (2001). She has received the Karnataka State Government Award (2001), Sangeet Nritya Academy Award of Karnataka (1997) and several other awards as well

- 'Indira Gandhi Priyadarshini Award' - presented by All-India National Unity Conference, New Delhi, 2001.
- 'Kala Shiromani Puraskaar' - presented by Institute of Economic Studies, Bangalore, 2001.
- 'Karnataka Kalasri' by the Sangeet Nritya Academy, Karnataka Government, 1997.
- 'Mahila Shiromani' Award for excellence in Classical Dance, Shiromani Foundation, New Delhi - presented by the First Lady of India at the Rashtrapati Bhavan, 1995.
- 'Natya Bharati' - Sri Srimukham Sree Virupaksha Vidyaranya Mahapeetam, Hampi, 1995.
- 'Orissa Cine Critics Award for Best Dancer', Bhubaneswar, 1991.
- 'Singaramani' - by Sur Singar Samsad, Bombay, 1987.
- 'Bangalore's Woman of the Decade' award in an internet poll conducted by bangalorebuzz.com in February, 2000
