= Thaskaraveeran (1957 film) =

- Directed by: S. M. Sriramulu Naidu
- Written by: T. Ramalingam Pillai
- Produced by: S. M. Sriramulu Naidu
- Starring: Sathyan; Ragini
- Edited by: G. Veluswami
- Music by: C. Ramchandra; S. M. Subbaiah Naidu
- Production company: Pakshiraja Films
- Distributed by: Kumaraswamy & Co.
- Release date: 29 November 1957
- Country: India
- Language: Malayalam

Thaskaraveeran is a 1957 Indian Malayalam-language film, directed and produced by Shri Ramulu Naidu. The film stars Sathyan and Ragini. The film had musical score by C. Ramchandra and S. M. Subbaiah Naidu. The movie was a remake of the director's own 1954 hit movie in Tamil Malaikkallan, starring M.G. Ramachandran (MGR) and P. Bhanumathi in the lead roles.

== Cast ==
- Sathyan as Kumar/Maayavi/Khan Sahib
- Ragini as Shobha
- Thikkurissy Sukumaran Nair as Police Officer
- Kedamangalam Sadanandan as Thampi
- P. A. Thomas as Vikraman
- Aranmula Ponnamma as Saraswathi
- Kanchana as Parvathy
- Kottarakkara Sreedharan Nair as Vijayan
- Kundara Bhasi as Panikkar
- S. P. Pillai as Pappu Pilla/441
- Priyadarsini
- Sukumari (Debut) as Janaki
