= Muthuswamy Pillai =

V. S. Muthuswamy Pillai
- Born: 24 October 1921
- Died: 18 January 1992
- Occupation: Choreographer
- Known for: Bharatanatyam
- Spouse: Valambal
- Children: M. Thaiyanayagi, M. Balu, M. Charubala, Kalaimamani Kuttalam M. Selvam, M. Arumugam, M. Vijayalakshmi, M. Geetha, M. Sambandam, M. Nirmala
- Awards: Kalaimamani, Sangeet Natak Akademi Award, Chevalier des Arts et des Lettres

Vaitheeswarankoil Sethuramu Muthuswamy Pillai (24 October 1921 – 18 January 1992) was a Bharatanatyam guru.

== Early life ==
V. S. Muthuswamy Pillai was born into a hereditary family of musicians, dancers and nattuvanars. When he was 5, after the death of his mother Sethuramu, his mother's uncle nattuvanar Vaitheeswarankoil Meenakshisundaram Pillai became his foster father. Muthuswamy Pillai observed him when he was teaching or conducting dance, and also got initiated in various aspects of music. He helped his foster father fulfilling hereditary temple duties: singing, reciting shollukatus and playing cymbals, and sometimes accompanying dance by devadasis. He felt the stigma attached to the hereditary practitioners of the performing arts as they were given little respect when they performed with devadasis as a form of entertainment.

When he was 15, he moved with his foster parents to Madras, but after the death of his younger sister Muthulakshmi, he decided to leave and settle in Mayavaram where he became the disciple of Kattumannarkoil Muthukumara Pillai, a highly respected nattuvanar. In his gurukul, he learnt the nuances of the art of bharatanatyam while he was taught a Margam (a sequence of dance compositions for the stage).

== Career ==
After his marriage to Valambal, daughter of Milagu Nattuvanar Ramaswami Pillai (1911–1991), he accepted to become a faculty at Nrithyodaya, the dance school of the film director K. Subrahmanyam in Madras. He was also associated to the performing group of this school, Natana Kala Seva. There, he was exposed to a fusion of various Indian classical dance styles and he could experiment with group choreography and dance dramas.

Similarly as other nattuvanars like Vazhuvoor Ramiah Pillai and his foster father Vaitheeswarankoil Meenakshisundaram Pillai, Muthuswamy Pillai became a sought after choreographer for the film industry. He was the dance director for movies in Tamil, Malayalam, Telugu and Hindi from the 1940s until the middle of the 1960s. He choreographed for more than 30 movies.

== The French connection ==
As the need for bharatanatyam choreographies was declining in the film industry, Muthuswamy Pillai was forced to enter a sabbatical period. While his family was staying in the village of Kuttalam, he settled in a small place in 7, East Mada Street, Mylapore and focused on his art. He developed his creativity on European students, mostly French, who came to Madras in order to learn from him in the 1970s and 1980s. They had to abandon the material comfort of their rich country of origin in order to live in Madras on small amounts of money even though some of them could rely on scholarships from the Indian Council for Cultural Relations and the French Government. Many of them were given Indian names that most of them are still using after returning to Europe : Menaka, Shakuntala, Maïtreyi, Padmavati, Kunti, Kalpana, etc. Other of his students are known by their original names like Tiziana Leucci, Élisabeth Petit, Armelle Choquard and Dominique Delorme.

== Indian students ==
- Sayee–Subbulakshmi learnt from Muthuswamy Pillai and performed his choreographies on stage and for the cinema.
- Pratibha Prahlad.
- Bragha Bessell learnt a full Margam from Muthuswamy Pillai with the permission of her guru Adyar K. Lakshman
- Jayalalithaa received some classes from Muthuswamy Pillai.

== Choreographic style ==
In 1989, the Sruti Foundation organised the Parampara Seminar where eminent gurus from five bharatanatyam traditions demonstrated their art. In this seminar, Muthuswamy Pillai demonstrated the style of his guru Kattumannarkoil Muthukumara Pillai and his own ideas.

Adavus are the basic steps of the bharatanatyam dance. Muthuswamy Pillai is known for elaborating countlessly many new variations of adavus. In some adavus families like Kutta (also named Ta-tai-ta-ha), he introduced variations of adavus that use only one hand. He also explored symmetry and asymmetry in the body and the stage space. The dancer may travel in any direction and may even turn their back to the audience.

He introduced new ideas in the Alarippu (which is the first dance items in a dance recital). The most traditional choreographies of this item use only a reduced movement vocabulary. While preserving the core structure of the Alarippu, Muthuswamy Pillai extended significantly the dance vocabulary used in this dance item.

As a master of rhythm, Muthuswamy Pillai choreographed using syncopated rhythmic patterns. In some dance compositions, he used all the five gatis (or panch-nadais), demonstrating five different ways of subdividing the main pulse into 4, 3, 7, 5 or 9 subdivisions. He used this procedure in different compositions, like the purely rhythmic Tala-Vadyam performed by his student Kalpana, or as Kalpanaswarams in the Kirtana Tamasam en swamy performed by Shakuntala.

Most of Muthuswamy Pillai's students had a separate guru for Abhinaya. Several of his French disciples learnt Abhinaya from Kalanidhi Narayanan.

== Awards ==
- Kalaimamani title awarded in 1972 by the Tamil Nadu Iyal Isai Nataka Manram
- Sangeet Natak Akademi Award for Bharatanatyam in 1989 conferred by the Central Government of India, New Delhi
- Chevalier des Arts et des Lettres awarded in 1990 by the French Government

== Sources ==
- Vijayaraghavan, Sujatha (April 2011). "A marvel of tradition and talent". Sruti. No. 319.
- "V. S. Muthuswamy Pillai". Sangeet Natak Akademi.
- Venkataraman, Leela (February 1990). "Spotlight on Traditional Gurus". Sruti. No. 65.
- National Seminar on Bharatanatyam Dance Traditions (1989): Muthuswamy Pillai (4 DVD set). The Sruti Foundation.
- Venkataraman, Leela (3 February 2011). "In the guru's mould". The Hindu.
- "The last disciple: An interview with Dominique Delorme". March 2011.
- Srikanth, Rupa (20 December 2018). "Bragha Bessell looks back on her dance journey". The Hindu.
- "Video of a Bharatanatyam recital by Caroline, Dominique Delorme, Patricia (Padmavati) conducted by Muthuswamy Pillai". National Cultural Audiovisual Archives.
