= Sayee–Subbulakshmi =

Indian female Bharatanatyam dancers

Sayee and Subbulakshmi as they appear in Naya Sansar (1959), Hindi film

Sayee and Subbulakshmi, popularly known as Sayee–Subbulakshmi, were two Indian female Bharatanatyam dancers who performed on stage in South Indian and Hindi films. They were a twin dance duo and were popular during the 1950s and 60s. They were noted for their synchronised dancing. They also performed Kathak and folk style dances in some regional language films and Hindi films.

== Family ==
They hail from a very large family whose members are well connected to the film industry. They are the descendants of Panrutti Adhilakshmi fondly called "Panrutti Ammal", mother of Carnatic singers P. A. Rajamani and P. A. Periyanayaki, who were popularly known as the Madras Sisters (Not to be confused with the Madras Sisters (Sashi, Kala, and Mala). They had also featured in Tamil films in various roles. P. A. Periyanayaki was also known as a playback singer. Lux soap beauty R. Padma, who featured in the 1941 comedy film Sabapathy is the mother-in-law of Sayee. Sayee is the daughter of P.A.Rajamani and Subbulakshmi is P.A.Rajamani's maternal first cousin.

(Note: Sayee is said to be the daughter of P. A. Rajamani and Subbulakshmi, who is 3 years older to Sayee, is her cousin. This could not be confirmed. However, both of them are closely related and belong to the same extended family.)

== Dance training ==
Sayee (L) Guru Muthuswami Pillai, Subbulakshmi

Muthuswamy Pillai is a dance teacher who has choreographed dances for films since 1938. P. A. Periyanayaki approached Muthuswami Pillai when he was choreographing a dance for B. S. Saroja in the film Inbavalli at Salem Ratna Studios. She requested him to train her niece Sayee and her cousin Subbulakshmi in dancing. Muthuswami Pillai accepted. He stayed with the family so that he could give exclusive training to the two. Sayee was about 5 years old at that time and Subbulakshmi was 3 years older. He made both watch dance performances by Kumari Kamala.

The two girls had a rigorous training - 3 hours in the morning and another 3 or 4 hours in the evening. Muthusami Pillai trained them for 7 years in between his film assignments. He took classes whenever he was in town.

Sayee and Subbulakshmi were trained in Kathak dance by Gopi Krishna, who was a dancer and the choreographer for the famed Hindi film Jhanak Jhanak Payal Baaje.

== Arangetram and Introduction to films ==
Sayee and Subbulakshmi had their Arangetram on 14 September 1953 at R. R. Sabha Hall in Chennai presided over by Rajah Sir M. A. Muthaiah Chettiar.

Within a year they had their first performance in the 1954 film Malaikkallan. The film was produced in 6 languages that opened opportunities far and wide for this dancing duo.

Apart from dancing, they have also featured in minor roles in some of the films they danced in.

Since 1954, they have performed in many South Indian regional films and Hindi films.

== Bharatanatyam performances ==
They held stage performances as well. When Sivaji Ganesan built a new house Annai Illam at Thiyagaraya Nagar in Chennai, the Bharatanatyam performance by Sayee and Subbulakshmi was the main item during reception.

== Style of dancing ==
Murumandi (half-seated) position in dance from the film Malaikkallan

The duo were felicitated by N. S. Krishnan as Pambara Sahodarigal (Spinning top sisters). The speed, precision, flexibility, springing leg movements coupled with the synchronisation made them a unique pair.

== Dance Teacher ==
After the 1960s, the trend in Indian films underwent a radical change and the type of dances performed by this duo went unnoticed. Subbulakshmi taught Bharatanatyam to students. She was the recipient of Kalaimamani Award in 1998 for her services as a teacher.

== Personal life ==
Sayee was married to V. S. Santaram, the eldest son of Lux beauty R. Padma. They have a son. Sayee suffered from breast cancer and died on 26 January 2010.

== Filmography ==
Year	Film	Language	Song(s) performed	Notes
1954	Malaikkallan	Tamil	“Neeli Magan Nee Allava”; “O Amma O Ayya”	Dance sequence
1954	Aggi Ramudu	Telugu	“Rara Yasoda Nandana”; “Paalaveroy”	Dance
1954	Ratha Kanneer	Tamil	“Kathavai Saathadi”	Dance
1955	Azaad	Hindi	“Aplam Chaplam”; “O Balliye Balliye”	Famous dance number
1955	Doctor Savithri	Tamil	“Naayagar Patchamadi”	Dance
1955	Gomathiyin Kaadhalan	Tamil	Dance sequence	Stage dance
1955	Jayasimha	Telugu	Court dance sequence	Rare appearance
1955	Donga Ramudu	Telugu	Festival dance	Rare appearance
1955	Mangaiyar Thilakam	Tamil	Stage dance	Rare appearance
1956	Alibabavum 40 Thirudargalum	Tamil	“Naama Aaduvadhum Paaduvadhum”	Dance
1956	Chori Chori	Hindi	“Man Bhawan Ke Ghar”	Dance
1956	Thaikkupin Tharam	Tamil	“Naadu Sezhithida”	Dance
1956	Madurai Veeran	Tamil	Temple dance sequence	Rare appearance
1956	Kudumba Vilakku	Tamil	Dance sequence	Rare appearance
1957	Karpukkarasi	Tamil	“Vizhiyodu Vilaiyaadum”	Dance
1957	Makkalai Petra Magarasi	Tamil	“Malliyakka Malliyakka Engadi Pora”	Dance
1957	Sharada	Hindi	“Joru Ka Ghulam”	Dance
1957	Mahadevi	Tamil	Court dance	Rare appearance
1957	Panduranga Mahatyam	Telugu	Devotional dance	Rare appearance
1958	Mangalya Bhagyam	Tamil	“Nenjathile Achcham”	Dance
1958	Periya Kovil	Tamil	“Aathaadi Thallaadha Thaathaavai”	Dance
1958	Nadodi Mannan	Tamil	Dance troupe appearance	Rare appearance
1959	Kan Thiranthathu	Tamil	“Panam Kaasu Padaichaale”	Dance
1959	Orey Vazhi	Tamil	“Kalvi Kalvi Endru Paadu”	Dance
1959	President Panchatcharam	Tamil	“Oli Padaitha Kanninaayi”	Dance
1959	Sivagangai Seemai	Tamil	“Muthu Pugazh Padaitthu”	Dance
1959	Veerapandiya Kattabomman	Tamil	Court dance troupe	Rare appearance
1961	Sati Sulochana	Telugu	“Jai Jai Jai Meghanaadhaa”	Dance
1963	Arivaali	Tamil	“Vaazhiya Needoozhi”	Dance
1963	Bharosa	Hindi	“Dhadka Ho Dil Dhadka Guzra Gali Se”	Dance

== Bibliography ==
- "Sayee and Subbulakshmi's Film-industry Relatives". Cinema Nritya Gharana. 5 October 2013. Archived from the original on 10 June 2017.
- "Muthuswami Pillai's Star Students". Cinema Nritya Gharana. 24 September 2013. Archived from the original on 10 June 2017.
- "Jhanak Jhanak Payal Baaje (1955)".
- "Dances on the Footpath". Richard S. 24 October 2008.
