= Lakshmi (writer) =

Indian writer

- Born: Thiripurasundari Srinivasan; 21 March 1921; Ammapettai, South Arcot District (Madras Presidency), British India,(now in Cuddalore district, Tamil Nadu, India.
- Died: 7 January 1987 (aged 65); Chennai, Tamil Nadu
- Occupation: Writer
- Spouse: Kannabiran
- Awards: Sahitya Akademi Award (1984)

Thiripurasundari Srinivasan (21 March 1921 – 7 January 1987), better known by her pen name Lakshmi, was an Indian writer from Tamil Nadu.

== Biography ==
=== Early life and education ===
Thiripurasundari was born t her maternal grandfather Muthuswamy Iyer's house in Ammapettai, a small village near Chidambaram, Tamil Nadu. Her parents, Dr. Srinivasan and Pattammal (Sivakami) are from Thottiyam, Tiruchirappalli. She was first enrolled in a veranda school at Ammapettai. She and her mother stayed in Ammapettai until later had three children. Dr. Srinivisan, who was studying medicine in chennai and then practicing at Sirganur, visit them often.

The family soon then moved to their native place, which is Thottiyam, Tiruchirappalli. Thiripurasundari pursued primary schooling there and later was admitted—despite being the only girl—to a boys’ high school in Musiri after persistent effort. Eventually the family moved closer to Manachanallur, which is closer to Trichy, where she continued her intermediate studies at Holy Cross Girls’ College, living in a hostel. After finishing her high school, she and her father wanted to continue her studies despite the hurdles from other family members. She later secured admission to Stanley Medical College in Chennai for medical studies.

While studying medicine, Lakshmi faced financial hardship when her mother fell ill as her father was unable to support her. Refusing to abandon her dreams, she approached S. S. Vasan, the publisher, offering to write stories in exchange for financial support. She came up with the short story Thagunda thandanaya? (lit. An apt punishment?) the next day, which was published in March, 1940 in Ananda Vikatan. She used the pen name Lakshmi which is her aunt's name, because she did not want her friends to identify her. Her first story received appreciation, and soon she was given the opportunity to write a serial. She wrote Bhavani, which earned her ₹500—a considerable amount then—and this helped her pay her fees and continue her studies.

She had four younger sisters and one younger brother.

=== Career and later years ===
Upon graduation, Lakshmi practiced medicine in Chennai and simultaneously pursued writing, authoring dozens of novels and hundreds of short stories. including Mithila Vilas, Arakku Maligai, Pen Manam, Kanchanayin Kanavu, Nayakkar Makkal, and more. She also wrote a medical textbook titled Thaymai, which earned her selection for a literary award to be presented at a Tamil conference in Sri Lanka. There, she met and fell in love with Tamil representative Kannabiran, an expatriate from South Africa. Upholding her convictions about caste and religion from her writing, she embraced an interfaith, intercaste marriage with him at Theosophical Society Adyar in 1955—marking a dramatic and bold life choice.

The couple moved to Durban, South Africa, where she practiced obstetrics for over two decades and stayed connected to Tamil writing by penning columns and experiences in Ananda Vikatan. Those writings were later published as Africa Kandathil Pala Aandugal. The couple had a son named Maheswaran. Tragedy struck when Kannabiran died unexpectedly in 1966, yet Lakshmi remained in South Africa until 1977. She returned to Chennai thereafter and devoted herself to writing full‑time, alongside part‑time medical consulting.

Lakshmi was awarded the Tamil Valarchi Kazhagam price. In 1984, she was awarded the Sahitya Akademi Award for Tamil for her novel Oru Kaveriyai pola (lit. Like the River Kaveri). Her Kanchanaiyin Kanavu and Penn Manam and sooryakandham, two of her best works, were made into Tamil films - Kanchana (1952) and Iruvar Ullam (1963). Most of her work was based on family issues.

She also chronicled her own life story in the popular series, which was later published in two volumes, titled Kadhaasiriyaiyin Kadhai. In 2009, when the Government of Tamil Nadu offered to nationalise her works, her legal heirs refused the offer.

Lakshmi died on January 7, 1987.

== Partial bibliography ==
In her writing career, Lakshmi has published over 1000 short stories and over 150 novels. Some of her novels include

- Adhisiya Raagam
- Adutha Veedu
- Arakku Maaligai
- Asoka maram pookavillai
- Aththai
- Aval oru Thendral
- Aval Thayagiral
- Avalukkendru oru idam
- Azhagin Aradhanai
- Bhavani
- En manaivi
- En veedu
- Gangaiyum Vandhal
- Irandaavadhu malar
- Irandaavadhu thenilavu
- Indrum naalayum
- Iniya unarvae ennai kolladhae
- Irandu pengal
- Irulil tholaindha unmai
- Ivala en magal
- Ivanum oru parasuraman
- Jeyanthi Vandhaal
- Kaaliyin kangal
- Kadaisi varai
- Kadhaasiriyaiyin Kadhai 1
- Kadhaasiriyaiyin Kadhai 2
- Kadhavu Thirandaal
- Kai maariya podhu
- Kanavan amaivedhallam
- Kashmi kathi
- Kodai megangal
- Koondukullae oru pachchai kili
- Kooramal sanniyasam
- Kazhuthil vizhundha maalai
- Maragadham
- Manam oru ranga rattinam
- Mann kudhirai
- Mannum pennum
- Maru magal
- Marupadiyuma?
- Mayamaan
- Meendum vasandham
- Meendum oru seethai
- Meendum pirandhaalin
- Meendum penn manam
- Mithilaa vilaas
- Mohini vanthaal
- Murugan sirithaan
- Mogathirai
- My name is T.G.Karthik
- Nadhi moolam
- Nalladhor veenai
- Nayakkar magal
- Nirka Neramillai
- Nyayangal marumpodhu
- Nigazhdha kadhaigal
- Neela pudavai
- Needhikku kaigal neelam
- Ooonrukol
- Oru Kaveriyai pola
- Oru Sivappu pachayagiradhu
- Pannayar magal
- Pavalamalli
- Punidha oru pudhir
- Pudhai manal
- Peyar solla maatten
- Penn manam
- Pennin parisu
- Radhaavin thirumanam
- Rama Rajyam
- Roja vairam
- Srimathi maithili
- Sasiyin kadidhangal
- Thirumbi paarthal
- Thunai
- Thai pirakattum
- Thottathu veedu
- Uravugal pirivathillai
- Uyarvu
- Uravin kural
- Uyire odivaa
- Vanitha
- Vasanthikku vandha aasai
- Vadakke oru sandhippu
- Vaazha ninaithaal
- Veerathevan kottai
- Velicham vandhadhu
- Vellai nirathiloru poonai

== Awards and recognitions ==
- Tamil Valarchi Kazhagam award for Penn manam and Mithila Vilas
- Sahitya Akademi Award for Tamil in 1984

== See also ==
- List of Sahitya Akademi Award winners for Tamil
- List of Indian writers
- List of Tamil-language writers
