= Kannika =

- Theatrical release poster
- Directed by: S. M. Sriramulu Naidu
- Written by: Elangovan
- Produced by: S. M. Sriramulu Naidu
- Starring: M. S. Sarojini; T. E. Varadan; N. S. Krishnan; T. A. Mathuram
- Music by: A. V. Natarajan
- Production company: Pakshiraja Studios
- Distributed by: Narayanan Company
- Release date: 11 November 1947
- Running time: 128 mins (16701 ft.)
- Language: Tamil

Kannika is a 1947 Indian Tamil-language film starring M. S. Sarojini, T. E. Varadan and M. R. Santhanalakshmi. The film was directed and produced by S. M. Sriramulu Naidu.

== Plot ==
King Paligna is a demon king whose life is imprisoned inside a dove. He constantly sacrifices young women, with a belief that by doing this, his soul will be made immortal. Shiva creates a man, Kumaran, to kill the king and end the sacrifices. After many twists and turns, Kumaran destroys Paligna by killing the dove and marries the king's daughter, Malini.

== Cast ==
Male cast

- T. E. Varadan B.Sc. as Kumaran
- D. Balasubramaniam as Paligna
- N. S. Krishnan as Veeran
- Kali. N. Rathnam as Pujari
- B. Rajagopala Iyer as Shivan
- K. Ramu as Vishnu
- A. V. Natarajan as Brahma
- Narsimhan as Naradar
- N. S. Narayana Pillai as Commander
- Ezhumalai as Pujari's disciple

Female cast

- M. S. Sarojini as Malini
- Hemamalini as young Malini
- M. R. Santhanalakshmi as Kannika
- Harini as young Kannika
- T. A. Mathuram as Prabhavathi
- Lalitha-Padmini as Shiva-Mohini

Choreography

- Vazhuvoor Ramaiah Pillai

== Soundtrack ==
The music was composed by A. V. Natarajan and the lyrics were penned by Papanasam Sivan except "Nadanam Aadinaar", which was penned by Gopala Krishna Bharathiyaar. Singers are M. S. Sarojini, T. E. Varadan and M. R. Santhanalakshmi. Playback singer is S. S. Mani.

No	Song	Singer	Length(m:ss)
1	"Nadanam Aadinaar"	M. S. Sarojini	04:07
2	"Enadhu Manam Thudikkuthe"	M. S. Sarojini	05:52
3	"Manam Kaninthu Intha Varam Tha"	M. R. Santhanalakshmi	00:72
4	"Narayana Hari Narayana Hari"	Narasimhan	02:46
5	"Yaanai Mugane Karunakarane"	M. S. Sarojini	02:29
6	"Sundareswarane Subakara"	S. S. Mani	
7	"Engum Niraindirukkum"	S. S. Mani	02:21
8	"Oon Naadi Kodiya Vilangukal Pol"	S. S. Mani	02:35
9	"Enna Anandam Paar"	M. S. Sarojini	03:38
10	"Yaaro Vanthen Iru Kann Pothinaar"	M. S. Sarojini, S. S. Mani	04:25
11	"Thaye Bhairaviye"	S. S. Mani	09:40
12	"Natarajan Un Thiru Nadam Kandu"	M. S. Sarojini, S. S. Mani	05:10
13	"Velli Malaikkarase"	M. S. Sarojini	
14	"Thikkutheriyadha Kaattil"	S. S. Mani	
15	"Buvanesa Shankarabharana Menru"	S. S. Mani, M. S. Sarojini, Narasimhan	03:46
16	"Maamanaar Muthalukku"	N. S. Krishnan	03:53
17	"Shiva-Mohini Dance"	Dance Music	04:01

== Release and reception ==
Kannika was released on 11 November 1947, and distributed by Narayanan Company. It emerged a box-office bomb. Film historian Randor Guy wrote in 2011 that the film will be "Remembered for the melodious music, impressive cinematography and the interesting onscreen narration."
