= Iruvar Ullam (1963 film) =

1963 film by L. V. Prasad

- Theatrical release poster
- Directed by: L. V. Prasad
- Screenplay by: M. Karunanidhi
- Based on: Pen Manam by Lakshmi
- Produced by: Anand
- Starring: Sivaji Ganesan; B. Saroja Devi
- Cinematography: K. S. Prasad
- Edited by: A. Sanjeevi
- Music by: K. V. Mahadevan
- Production company: Prasad Movies
- Distributed by: Sivaji Films
- Release date: 29 March 1963
- Running time: 165 minutes
- Country: India
- Language: Tamil

Iruvar Ullam (transl. Couple's Heart) is a 1963 Indian Tamil-language romance film, directed by L. V. Prasad and written by M. Karunanidhi. Based on Lakshmi's novel Pen Manam, the film stars Sivaji Ganesan and B. Saroja Devi, while M. R. Radha, S. V. Ranga Rao, T. R. Ramachandran, T. P. Muthulakshmi, Santhiya and Padmini Priyadarshini play supporting roles. It is a remake of the 1961 Telugu film Bharya Bhartalu.

The music was composed by K. V. Mahadevan, while the lyrics were written by Kannadasan. K. S. Prasad and A. Sanjeevi handled cinematography and editing respectively. The filming was held in places like Kodaikanal, Kanyakumari and Bangalore.

Iruvar Ullam was released on 29 March 1963 and became a box office success. Clips of the film were used to portray the younger Ganesan and Saroja in the 1997 film Once More, which Saroja Devi considered a sequel to Iruvar Ullam.

== Plot ==
Selvam, the younger son of a prosecutor Neethimanickam, is a medical student studying in Bangalore. Unlike his righteous father, he is a playboy. Vasanthi, a scheming woman, tries to blackmail Selvam into marriage. On his refusal, she writes to his father. Selvam's uncle Gnanasigamani, another lawyer, arrives in Bangalore and pays ₹10,000 to Vasanthi to silence her.

Selvam stops studying and arrives in Madras. He takes over the responsibility of managing his uncle's company. He eventually sees Shanta, a teacher, on the road and pursues her. Shanta dislikes Selvam's continuing old habits, but he eventually transforms and wants to settle down with her, yet she continues disliking him.

Shanta is eventually forced by her parents to marry Selvam. When Vasanthi is murdered by her lover Paramathma, Selvam is wrongfully convicted; this brings the couple closer. Shanta later exposes Paramathma, and Selvam is released.

== Cast ==
- Sivaji Ganesan as Selvam
- B. Saroja Devi as Shantha
- M. R. Radha as Gnanasigamani
- S. V. Ranga Rao as Neethimanickam
- T. R. Ramachandran as Sri Paramathma
- T. P. Muthulakshmi as Kannamma
- Santhiya as Nagammal
- Padmini Priyadarshini as Vasanthi
- K. Balaji as Minor Manickam
- S. Rama Rao as Gurusamy, Shanta's father
- A. Karunanidhi as Soda Subbaiya, Gurusamy's father-in-law
- R. Balasubramanian as Nagamma's brother
- Lakshmi Rajyam as Gurusamy's second wife
- Radha Bai as School Headmasters

== Production ==
Iruvar Ullam was directed by L. V. Prasad and produced by A. Anand under Prasad Movies. The film is based on Lakshmi's novel Pen Manam, which was previously adapted into the Telugu film Bharya Bhartalu (1961). However Lakshmi's name was not credited in the opening titles. The screenplay was written by M. Karunanidhi, who received a salary of ₹20,000 (equivalent to ₹1.8 million or US$19,000 in 2026). Cinematography was handled by K. S. Prasad and the editing by A. Sanjeevi. The filming was held in places like Kodaikanal, Kanyakumari and Bangalore.

A scene in the film required a particularly powerful emotional performance from B. Saroja Devi. According to an anecdote later recounted by Sivaji Ganesan, he initially approached the scene intending to match and outdo her performance. However, director L. V. Prasad stopped filming and took Ganesan aside, explaining that the scene was deliberately designed for Saroja Devi's character to dominate. He advised Ganesan to refrain from trying to overpower her performance and instead simply observe her, allowing the emotional weight of her dialogue and performance to take centre stage. Ganesan later recalled this experience as a lesson in the importance of restraint and knowing when not to act in order to serve the story. Iruvar Ullam was the final Tamil film directed by Prasad. The final length of the film was 35,441 feet (4,543 m).

== Soundtrack ==
The film's soundtrack and background score were composed by K. V. Mahadevan, while the lyrics for the songs were written by Kannadasan. A. L. Raghavan initially sang the song "Buddhi Sigamani", picturised on M. R. Radha, in a manner that would match Radha's hoarse voice, but Prasad did not accept this and told Raghavan to sing with a melodious voice. When Radha objected to Prasad's decision, Prasad said he would have the song recorded with a melodious voice, and if Radha did not like the final recording, it would be excluded from the film; after listening to the final recording, Radha approved.

Title	Singer's
"Paravaigal Palavitham"	T. M. Soundararajan
"Idayaveenai"	P. Susheela
"Azhagu Sirikkindrathu"	T. M. Soundararajan, P. Susheela
"Nadhi Engey Pogirathu"	T. M. Soundararajan, P. Susheela
"Yean Azuthai"	T. M. Soundararajan
"Kanneya Kanneya Urangatheya"	P. Susheela
"Buddhi Sigamani"	A. L. Raghavan, L. R. Eswari
"Kannethire Thondrinal"	T. M. Soundararajan

== Release and reception ==
Iruvar Ullam was released on 29 March 1963, and distributed by Sivaji Films. It was promoted as a "newspaper cutting that featured pencil sketches of two hearts", each displaying the name of the lead actor and actress. On 9 April, The Indian Express wrote that it "has one significant and rare virtue. Its basic dramatic design is of a lightly pleasant variety, with the sweet underlining of a playful romance". On 21 April, the magazine Kalki positively reviewed the film, praising Saroja Devi for delivering a very natural performance. The film was a commercial success, running for over 100 days in theatres. Lakshmi who saw the film was shocked with the twist of the protagonist being blamed for the murder as she felt the film completely deviated from her novel.

== Legacy ==
Film journalist Sujatha Narayanan considers Iruvar Ullam a trendsetter for "all following films that dealt with post-marriage narratives" in Tamil cinema. Clips of the film were used to portray the younger Ganesan and Saroja Devi in the 1997 film Once More, which Saroja Devi considered a sequel to Iruvar Ullam.

== Bibliography ==
- Ganesan, Sivaji; Narayana Swamy, T. S. (2007) [2002]. Autobiography of an Actor: Sivaji Ganesan, October 1928 – July 2001. Sivaji Prabhu Charities Trust. OCLC 297212002.
- Pillai, Swarnavel Eswaran (2015). Madras Studios: Narrative, Genre, and Ideology in Tamil Cinema. SAGE Publications. ISBN 9789351502128.
- Rajadhyaksha, Ashish; Willemen, Paul (1998) [1994]. Encyclopaedia of Indian Cinema. British Film Institute and Oxford University Press. ISBN 0-19-563579-5.
