= Delhi International Arts Festival =

International arts festival

The Delhi International Arts Festival is an annual arts festival which takes place in Delhi, India. It presents artistic performances from around the world.

== History ==
The Delhi International Arts Festival was founded in 2007 as a private-public partnership venture in New Delhi, India. Delhi International Arts Festival is India's famous & visible festival of arts. It was founded in 2007 by Founder Festival Director Prathibha Prahlad. The experts who supported the idea of an International Arts Festival in Delhi were late Ram Nivas Mirdha of Sangeet Natak Akademi, Sri Pavan Varma of ICCR, Sri Parvez Dewan of ITDC and others. Forum For Art Beyond Borders was registered as a trust to organise Delhi International Arts Festival annually. Aruna Vasudev, Shanta Serbjeetsingh SINGH, SK Aggrawal, Kusum Sahni & Prathibha Prahlad are the trustees. DIAF has presented over 100,000 artists from all over the world in the last 11 years.

In 2015 the festival was held at the Purana Quila and directed by Prathibha Prahlad. The focus that year was Indo-African fusion.
