= Kalyaniyin Kanavan =

- Theatrical release poster
- Directed by: S. M. Sriramulu Naidu
- Screenplay by: S. M. Sriramulu Naidu
- Story by: Velavan
- Produced by: S. M. Sriramulu Naidu
- Starring: Sivaji Ganesan; B. Saroja Devi
- Cinematography: Sailen Bose
- Edited by: G. Veluswamy
- Music by: S. M. Subbaiah Naidu
- Production company: Pakshiraja Studios
- Release date: 20 September 1963
- Country: India
- Language: Tamil

Kalyaniyin Kanavan (transl. Kalyani's Husband) is a 1963 Indian Tamil-language film, directed and produced by S. M. Sriramulu Naidu. The film stars Sivaji Ganesan and B. Saroja Devi, with M. R. Radha, S. V. Ranga Rao, T. R. Ramachandran and T. P. Muthulakshmi in supporting roles. It was released on 20 September 1963.

== Plot ==
Kalyani goes swimming with friends in a river when she is carried away by a strong current. As she struggles, Kathiresan saves her, and they fall in love. Kalyani's father Viswanath is impressed by the young man's bravery and wishes to get them married on an auspicious day. Two days before the wedding, Kathiresan receives an anonymous letter inviting him to an abandoned bungalow. He goes and, in the cover of darkness, fights an anonymous foe. At the end of it, he finds at his feet a body with a knife sticking out of its back! He leaves the place hurriedly. The next morning, Kathiresan, shocking everyone, screams at the bride saying she is not of good conduct and refuses to go ahead with the wedding rituals. Meanwhile, police enter the scene, looking for the bridegroom who escapes. With the marriage stopped in a dramatic fashion, problems arise in the unhappy Viswanath's family. How they are solved and the marriage is performed forms the rest of the story.

== Cast ==
Male cast

- Sivaji Ganesan as Kathiresan
- M. R. Radha as Somayya
- S. V. Ranga Rao as Viswanath
- T. R. Ramachandran as Sigamani
- O. A. K. Thevar as the police inspector
- A. Karunanidhi as the constable
- S. Rama Rao as Ambi
- K. V. Srinivasan as the village chief
- A. Kannayya as the servant

Female cast

- B. Saroja Devi as Kalyani
- T. P. Muthulakshmi as Ramayee
- Seethalakshmi as Kamalamma
- Radhika as Manjula
- Shantha Devi as Megala

== Soundtrack ==
The music was composed by S. M. Subbaiah Naidu, with lyrics by Kannadasan.

Song	Singers	Length
"Enakku Vaikkum Maappillai"	P. Susheela	04:06
"Kai Irukku Kaal Irukku"	T. M. Soundararajan	03:40
"Aasai Konda Manam"	P. Susheela	02:22
"Enathu Raja Sabaiyile"	T. M. Soundararajan, P. Susheela	03:14
"Kalyana Pudava Katti"	P. Susheela	03:35
"Naal Ondrum Pozhudhu"	P. Susheela	03:22
"Solli Theriyadhu"	T. M. Soundararajan, P. Susheela	03:12
"Unakka Theriyadhu"	T. M. Soundararajan, P. Susheela	03:22
"Ethaiyum Nandra Edaipodamal Ithuvum Vendumada"	T. M. Soundararajan	02:55
"Ennadi Ponnu"	A. L. Raghavan, Kausalya	03:15
"Kallirukkum Malar"	P. Leela, T. Kamala & T. Thangappan	

== Release and reception ==
Kalyaniyin Kanavan was released on 20 September 1963, and did not do well at the box office as it ran for 10 weeks in most theatres. T. M. Ramachandran wrote in Sport and Pastime, "The film keeps up a breezy pace but it is obvious that when the director found that he had used up a good deal of footage early on, he has put an abrupt end to the story by untying all the knots in the plot all of a sudden and providing a happy solution".
