= Karpukkarasi =

1957 film by A. S. A. Sami

- Theatrical release poster
- Directed by: A. S. A. Sami
- Screenplay by: A. S. A. Sami; Aru. Ramanathan
- Story by: Siva-Sundaram
- Produced by: M. Somasundaram
- Starring: Gemini Ganesan; Savitri; M. N. Nambiar; M. K. Radha; G. Varalakshmi; K. A. Thangavelu
- Cinematography: P. Ramasamy
- Edited by: K. Govindasamy
- Music by: G. Ramanathan
- Production company: Jupiter Pictures
- Distributed by: Jupiter Pictures
- Release date: 14 June 1957
- Running time: 137 minutes
- Country: India
- Language: Tamil

Karpukkarasi is a 1957 Indian Tamil-language swashbuckler film directed by A. S. A. Sami and produced by M. Somasundaram under Jupiter Pictures. The story and screenplay were written by A. S. A. Sami and Aru. Ramanathan. The dialogues were written by Siva-Sundaram. The film stars Gemini Ganesan, M. N. Nambiar, R. Balasubramaniam, and K. A. Thangavelu, with G. Varalakshmi, M. K. Radha, Savitri E. V. Saroja and M. Saroja in supporting roles. It was released on 14 June 1957.

== Cast ==
Male cast

- Gemini Ganesan as Prathaban
- M. N. Nambiar as Jagaveeran
- M. K. Radha as Vajarapuri King
- K. A. Thangavelu as Chilamban
- R. Balasubramanyam as the wizard
- P. S. Venkatachalam as Sachithananda Yogi
- P. B. Rangachari as Sage

Female cast

- K. Savithri as Manjula
- G. Varalakshmi as Chandrika
- E. V. Saroja as Sasikala
- K. R. Chellam as Singari
- M. Saroja as Pankajam
- S. Revathi as Magical Queen
- S. Mohana as Mohana

Dance

- Sayee
- Subbulakshmi
- Ragini
- Kantha

== Production ==
One scene required Ganesan to throw a knife at Nambiar. He did so, but the director had not called for "action" when Nambiar saw something come straight at him like a "bat out of hell". Nambiar only had one second to turn his head before the knife grazed his eye and impaled itself into the wall, leaving Nambiar with a permanent black spot on the eye. Ganesan had thrown the knife long before the shot was supposed to roll, only to impress two women who had walked on to the set.

== Soundtrack ==
Music was by G. Ramanathan.

| Song | Singers | Lyrics | Length |
|---|---|---|---|
| "Kaniyaa Kanniyaa Vaazhvil Inbam Sollavaa | T. M. Soundararajan & Jikki | | 03:28 |
| "Nalvaakku Nee Kodadi | S. C. Krishnan & A. G. Rathnamala | | 03:31 |
| "Sellakkiliye Allik Kulame | A. P. Komala | | 01:50 |
| "Aadum Ponne Aasai Kanne | K. Jamuna Rani | | 01:00 |
| "Anbe Aandavan Aagum | Seerkazhi Govindarajan | | 01:00 |
| "Enakkoru Manakkurai Agatridal Vendum" | V. T. Rajagopalan | | 00:25 |
| "Thoongaadhu Kann Thoongaadhu" | T. M. Soundararajan | Pattukkottai Kalyanasundaram | 01:45 |
| "Thatthkaa Putthakaa Naalu Kaalu" | Seerkazhi Govindarajan & P. Leela | | 02:00 |
| "Kaayame Idhu Meiyadaa" | T. M. Soundararajan & Seerkazhi Govindarajan | Pattukkottai Kalyanasundaram | 02:40 |
| "Ambigaapathi Seidha Pizhai" | T. M. Soundararajan | | 01:45 |
| "Vizhiyodu Vilayaadum" | M. L. Vasanthakumari & P. Leela | A. Maruthakasi | 06:22 |
| "Illaadha Adhisayamaai Irukkudhudhadi" | A. P. Komala & K. Jamuna Rani | Pattukkottai Kalyanasundaram | 02:50 |
| "Marundho Marundhu...Naattu Vaitthiyar" | T. M. Soundararajan & Seerkazhi Govindarajan | | 01:42 |
| "Pudhu Vaazhvum...Pirinndhavar Koodinaal" | K. Jamuna Rani | | 00:50 |
| "Idhaya Vaanile Udhayamaanadhe" | T. M. Soundararajan & Jikki | | 01:59 |
| "Kaniyo Paago Karkando" | P. B. Sreenivas & M. L. Vasanthakumari | Udumalai Narayana Kavi | 03:42 |
| "Ellai Merudhe Manam Thulli Aadudhe" | K. Jamuna Rani, A. P. Komala & A. G. Rathnamala | Pattukkottai Kalyanasundaram | 04:30 |
