= Mallika (1957 film) =

- Theatrical release poster
- Directed by: Joseph Thaliath Jr.
- Screenplay by: Nanjilnadu T. N. Rajappa
- Story by: M. A. Durai
- Produced by: Joseph Thaliath Jr.
- Starring: Gemini Ganesan; Padmini
- Music by: T. R. Pappa
- Production company: Citadel Films Corporation
- Distributed by: Rajashri Pictures
- Release date: 19 July 1957
- Country: India
- Language: Tamil

Mallika is a 1957 Indian Tamil-language film directed by Joseph Thaliath Jr. The film stars Gemini Ganesan and Padmini. It was released on 19 July 1957, and remade in Hindi as Payal the same year.

== Plot ==
Kamala and Padma are the daughters of a businessman stationed in Burma. Due to losses, the businessman is forced to return to India with his wife and daughters. The plane crashes and the parents are killed. Padma, the younger daughter, loses her eyesight. Kamala joins a dance troupe for a living and to save for treatment of her sister. Kamala meets Mohan, a man from an affluent family, and falls in love with him. But Mohan's parents are against the marriage because Kamala is a dancer and they consider her as someone of low moral character. Mohan's father is murdered and Mohan is arrested. Kamala takes the blame in order to save Mohan. The truth is eventually revealed, Padma regains her sight and all ends well for everyone.

== Cast ==
- R. Ganesh as Mohan
- Padmini as Kamala
- T. S. Balaiah
- K. A. Thangavelu
- M. N. Rajam
- T. V. Kumudhini
- Baby Rajakumari as Padma
- Lakshmirajam
- N. S. Narayana Pillai
- Peer Mohamed
- Sharma
- Ganapathi Bhat
- P. B. Vairam

== Production ==
This is the first film produced by the Citadel Films Corporation owned by Joseph Thaliath Jr, who also directed the film. Nanjilnadu T. N. Rajappa, who wrote the dialogues, also worked as the assistant director. Hiralal choreographed Padmini's dances, and was assisted by Chinni and Sampath. M. G. Naidu, who later founded the Naidu Hall, worked as the costume designer on the film.

== Soundtrack ==
The music was composed by T. R. Pappa.

Song	Singer/s	Lyricist	Duration(m:ss)
"Neela Vanna Kannane Unadhu"	P. Susheela	M. K. Athmanathan	03:43
"Maanatthai Kaappadhu Ponnu"	S. C. Krishnan & Jikki	A. Maruthakasi	03:50
"En Kannil Kalandhu Vilaiyaadum"	A. M. Raja & P. Suseela	A. Maruthakasi	02:47
"Pagattile Ulagam Emaarudhu"	S. C. Krishnan		02:49
"Mangaamal Valarum Singaara Nadanam"	P. Suseela	A. Maruthakasi	02:55
"Thaye Nee Kan Paarai"	Jikki		02:49
"Varuven Naan Unadhu Maaligaiyin"	A. M. Raja & P. Suseela	A. Maruthakasi	03:14
"Varundhathe Ezhai Maname"	Jikki		03:09

== Reception ==
Kanthan of Kalki positively reviewed Mallika. Despite this, the film was an average success, but was remade in Hindi as Payal the same year with Padmini returning.
