= Aayiram Kannudayaal =

1986 film by K. Shankar

- Directed by: K. Shankar
- Screenplay by: K. Shankar
- Story by: Vietnam Veedu Sundaram
- Produced by: R. Jambunaathan
- Starring: Padmini; Jeevitha; Prabha; Baby Shalini
- Cinematography: M. C. Sekar
- Edited by: K. Shankar; V. Devan
- Music by: Shankar–Ganesh
- Production company: Sasivarnam Films
- Release date: 21 November 1986
- Running time: 136 minutes
- Country: India
- Language: Tamil

Aayiram Kannudayaal (transl. Goddess with thousand eyes) is a 1986 Indian Tamil-language devotional film directed by K. Shankar. The film stars Padmini, Jeevitha, Prabha and Baby Shalini. It was released on 21 November 1986.

== Cast ==
- Padmini
- Jeevitha
- Prabha
- Baby Shalini
- Rajeev
- M. N. Nambiar
- V. K. Ramasamy
- Senthil
- Loose Mohan
- Heran Ramasamy
- Manorama
- Gandhimathi
- Ennatha Kannaiya
- LIC Narasimhan
- Shankar–Ganesh in special appearance

== Soundtrack ==
Soundtrack was composed by Shankar–Ganesh.

Track listing
No.	Title	Singer(s)	Length
1.	"Aayiram Kunnudaiyaal"	Vani Jairam, Sirkazhi G. Sivachidambaram
2.	"Maatharin Kungumam"	Vani Jairam
3.	"Sirikkatthaane"	K. S. Chithra
4.	"Amma Thaaye"	P. Susheela, Vani Jairam
5.	"Vaigai Karai Meenakshi"	Vani Jairam
6.	"Oru Kodi"	K. J. Yesudas

== Critical reception ==
Jayamanmadhan of Kalki felt that Rajeev's acting of keeping straight face till the end was a new lesson he taught to the audience and also added Padmini, Nambiar, Manorama did not have proper roles and concluded that since it is directed by legendary director K. Shankar so only old glory can be told now otherwise nothing special. Balumani of Anna praised the acting, humour, music, dialogues, cinematography and direction but felt the length of the first story could have been reduced.
