= Ezhai Padum Padu =

1950 film by K. Ramnoth

- Theatrical release poster
- Directed by: K. Ramnoth
- Screenplay by: Elangovan
- Story by: Sudhanandha Bharathiar
- Based on: Les Misérables by Victor Hugo
- Produced by: S. M. Sriramulu Naidu
- Starring: V. Nagayya; Lalitha; Padmini
- Cinematography: N. Prakash
- Edited by: Surya
- Music by: S. M. Subbaiah; V. Nagayya (supervision)
- Production company: Pakshiraja Studios
- Distributed by: Narayana & Co. Ltd
- Release date: 9 November 1950
- Running time: 197 minutes
- Country: India
- Languages: Tamil; Telugu

Ezhai Padum Padu (transl. Plight of the Poor) is a 1950 Indian Tamil language film directed by K. Ramnoth. It was simultaneously shot in Telugu as Beedala Patlu. It was an adaptation of Les Misérables, Victor Hugo's 1862 novel. The film was released on Diwali day. For his memorable portrayal of Javert in this film, N. Seetharaman came to be called as Javert Seetharaman. It was produced by S. M. Sriramulu Naidu of Pakshiraja Studios.

== Plot ==
Tough and ruthless police inspector Javert recaptures a small-time criminal Kandhan who has escaped from prison.

Kandhan turns a new leaf with the help of a Christian Bishop. When he is released from prison he starts a glass making company.

He changes his identity and becomes successful and even becomes the mayor of his town. Inspector Javert finds out about his new life and threatens to expose him. Kandhan then saves Javert's life. Javert commits suicide - unable to turn Kandhan in to the authorities out of his sense of gratitude.

== Cast ==
The cast of Ezhai Padum Padu, according to the opening credits of the film:

Male Cast

- V. Nagayya as Kandhan Dayalan Ambalavanan
- T. S. Balaiah as Ramgopal
- T. S. Durairaj as Masilamani Mudaliar
- Serukulathur Sama as Christian Bishop (Saadhu Uthamar)
- N. Seetharaman as Inspector Javar
- V. Gopalakrishnan as Umakandhan
- Kali N. Rathnam as Nagam
- M. R. Swaminathan as Nagan's Cousin
- S. Peer Mohamed as Vedhagiri Mudaliar
- Nat Annaji Rao as Judge
- T. K. Kalyanam as Ranga Das

Male Support Cast

K. S. Kanaiah, S. V. Shanmugam Pillai, S. V. Shanmugam, V. S. Rao, Manickam

Female Cast

- Lalitha as Anjala
- Padmini as Lakshmi
- Kumari N. Rajam as Rajam
- P. S. Gnanam as Naagi
- S. R. Janaki as Kandhan's Sister
- Baby Meenakshi as Baby Lakshmi
- Ragini as Female Dancer
- Thangam as Female Dancer
- Kalyani as Female Dancer
- Rita as Female Dancer
- Janaki as Female Dancer
- Radhamani as Female Dancer

== Production ==
Ezhai Padum Padu was produced by S. M. Sriramulu Naidu at Pakshiraja Studios in Coimbatore. K. Ramnoth was hired as the director and V. Nagayya was cast as Kandan (based on Jean Valjean). Initially, Nagercoil K. Mahadevan was cast as the bishop who reforms the thief. But after a few scenes were shot, Sriramulu Naidu replaced him with Serukalathur Sama. Elangovan (Thanigachalam) wrote the script for Ezhai Padum Paau based on Sudhanandha Bharathi's translation of Les Miserables. Sriramulu Naidu was known for his strict schedule. Once when director Ramnoth was absent from the set, one of the actors – V. Gopalakrishnan – left the set thinking that there would be no filming on that day. An incensed Naidu filmed the scene (a love song sequence) using an actress (Ragini) dressed up as a man instead of Gopalakrishnan.

== Soundtrack ==
The soundtrack had ten songs composed by S. M. Subbaiah Naidu. The lyrics were by V. A. Gopalakrishnan.

Tamil Soundtrack

Song	Singers	Length
"Yauvanamae Aahaa Yauvanamae"	M. L. Vasanthakumari	02:19
"Oo Kiliye Aasai Kiliye"	P. A. Periyanayaki	01:21
"Vaanamudhe Ondraai"	Thiruchi Loganathan, M. L. Vasanthakumari & P. A. Periyanayaki	05:28
"Kannan Mananilaiyai Thangame Thangam"	M. L. Vasanthakumari	03:25
"Kanivudan Thirumbiye Paarum"	P. A. Periyanayaki	03:12
"Ennaasai Paappa"	V. Nagayya	01:54
"Vidhiyin Vilaivaal Anaadhi Aanaen"	Radha Jayalakshmi	03:13
"Vaazhvu Malarndhadhuvae"	V. Nagayya	03:08
"En Bhaagyame Inimel Saubhagyame"	Radha Jayalakshmi	02:31

Telugu Soundtrack

Music is by S. M. Subbaiah Naidu and G. Aswathama. Lyrics were by Aarudhra.

Song	Singers	Length
"Yauvanamae Aahaa Yauvanamae"	M. L. Vasanthakumari	02:19
"Chilukaraajaa Neeku Pelli"	P. A. Periyanayaki	01:21
"Povudhama Sakhiya Premalokamu"		05:28
"Sarasaku Radelane"	M. L. Vasanthakumari	03:25
"Kanikaramadi Kaladeni"	P. A. Periyanayaki	03:12
"Chinnari Paapa"	V. Nagayya	01:54
"Vidhivasamaithi Anaadhanaithi"	Radha Jayalakshmi	03:13
"Dhanyudanaithiniga Naa Janma"	V. Nagayya	03:08
"Vilaasame Naakika Vikaasame Lalala"	Radha Jayalakshmi	02:31
"Aadavemayoori Nee Vandela"		
"Rara Sakhudhaa Raave Sakhiyaa"		
"Vinarandi Kanarandi Visaadamayamau"		

== Release and reception ==
Ezhai Padum Padu was released on Diwali day (9 November), 1950. It was a commercial and critical success.

== See also ==
- Adaptations of Les Misérables

== Bibliography ==
- Baskaran, S. Theodore (1996). The eye of the serpent: an introduction to Tamil cinema. Chennai: East West Books. pp. 69, 106.
- Hardy, Phil (1997). The BFI companion to crime. University of California Press. ISBN 0-520-21538-9.
- Rajadhyaksha, Ashish; Willemen, Paul (1998) [1994]. Encyclopaedia of Indian Cinema. British Film Institute and Oxford University Press. ISBN 0-19-563579-5.
