= Ennathe Kannaiah =

Indian comedian (1925–2012)

- Born: K. S. Kannaiah; 1925; Dindigul - Ayyapatty
- Died: 7 August 2012 (aged 87); Chennai, India
- Occupation: Actor
- Years active: 1949–2012
- Spouse: Rajam
- Children: 6

Ennathe Kannaiah (1925 - 7 August 2012) was a comedian who appeared in Tamil-language films. In the Ravichandran-Jayalalita starrer Naan, as he spoke his dialogues, he frequently used the word "Ennathe" (transl. What?) and this became his nickname. Decades later, he became even better known for his dialogue, "Varuum... Aanaa Varaadhu" (transl. [It'll] come, but won't come).

== Film career ==
After debuting in the Tamil film Ezhai Padum Padu in 1950, he acted in more than 250 films. He predominantly was cast in supporting roles in films of M. G. Ramachandran like Nam Naadu (1969), En Annan (1970), Thedi Vandha Mappillai (1970) and others. He later starred in films including Rajinikanth's Thambikku Entha Ooru (1984). The scenes in which he appeared as a mahout were popular in the 1980s. Though he made many films, he became famous for his dialogue in Thottal Poo Malarum (2007) (Varum, Aanaa Varaadhu...) with Vadivelu.

== Partial filmography ==
| Year | Film | Role |
|---|---|---|
| 1949 | Ratnakumar | |
| 1950 | Ezhai Padum Padu | |
| 1953 | Ponni | Muniyan |
| 1954 | Malaikkallan | Kannappar |
| 1957 | Mudhalali | |
| 1958 | Kathavarayan | |
| 1959 | Maragatham | |
| 1959 | Ulagam Sirikkirathu | Banker's Muniyandi Pillai |
| 1963 | Arivaali | Kanthasamy |
| 1963 | Ratha Thilagam | |
| 1967 | Naan | |
| 1967 | Kaavalkaaran | Doctor |
| 1967 | Raja Veetu Pillai | Chettiyar |
| 1968 | Kudiyirundha Koyil | |
| 1968 | Kannan En Kadhalan | |
| 1969 | Nam Naadu | Kannaiya the lame |
| 1970 | Thedi Vandha Mappillai | Jeweler |
| 1970 | Sorgam | |
| 1971 | Veettukku Oru Pillai | |
| 1972 | Idhaya Veenai | Snake charmer |
| 1973 | Thirumalai Deivam | Anumanthu |
| 1974 | Netru Indru Naalai | Drama artist |
| 1974 | Panathukkaga | |
| 1975 | Idhayakkani | Tour guide |
| 1976 | Needhikku Thalaivanangu | The collector of rent |
| 1977 | Navarathinam | Villager |
| 1978 | Ennai Pol Oruvan | Aasari Arulprakasam |
| 1982 | Krodham | Vandu |
| 1982 | Manjal Nila | |
| 1983 | Sivappu Sooriyan | |
| 1984 | Thambikku Entha Ooru | |
| 1984 | Naan Mahaan Alla | Assistant |
| 1985 | Padikkadha Pannaiyar | |
| 1986 | Marumagal | |
| 1986 | Enakku Nane Needipathi | |
| 1986 | Aayiram Kannudayaal | |
| 1987 | Jaathi Pookkal | |
| 1987 | Veerapandiyan | Kannaiya |
| 1988 | Puthiya Vaanam | |
| 1989 | Poruthathu Pothum | Prisonner |
| 1989 | Rajanadai | Jail Superintendent |
| 1989 | Meenakshi Thiruvilayadal | |
| 1990 | En Kadhal Kanmani | Restaurant worker |
| 1992 | Mannan | |
| 1993 | Karuppu Vellai | |
| 1994 | Indhu | Servant |
| 1994 | Sevatha Ponnu | |
| 1995 | Deva | Villager |
| 1995 | Thirumoorthy | |
| 1996 | Mahaprabhu | |
| 2000 | Seenu | Servant |
| 2001 | Middle Class Madhavan | Kuzhandhaivelu's father |
| 2004 | Arivumani | Police Officer |
| 2006 | Em Magan | Dying grandfather |
| 2007 | Thottal Poo Malarum | Blind Car driver |
| 2007 | Thavam | |
| 2009 | Thoranai | |
| 2009 | Padikkadavan | |

== Death ==
He died on 7 August 2012.
