= Maragatham =

- Theatrical release poster
- Directed by: S. M. Sriramulu Naidu
- Screenplay by: S. M. Sriramulu Naidu; Murasoli Maran (dialogues)
- Based on: Karunkuyil Kunrathu Kolai by T. S. D. Sami
- Produced by: S. M. Sriramulu Naidu
- Starring: Sivaji Ganesan; Padmini
- Cinematography: Sailen Bose
- Edited by: Velusamy
- Music by: S. M. Subbaiah
- Production company: Pakshiraja Studios
- Release date: 21 August 1959
- Running time: 203 minutes
- Country: India
- Language: Tamil

Maragatham (transl. Emerald) is a 1959 Indian Tamil-language crime thriller film produced, directed and co-written by S. M. Sriramulu Naidu. It is an adaptation of the novel Karunkuyil Kunrathu Kolai by T. S. D. Sami. The film stars Sivaji Ganesan and Padmini. It was released on 21 August 1959.

== Plot ==
Based on an interesting crime thriller by T.S.D. Sami, the film has a sub-title ‘Karunkuyil Kunrathu Kolai' within brackets.

== Cast ==
Male Cast

- Sivaji Ganesan as Varendran
- T. S. Balaiah
- Chandrababu as Gundan
- S. Balachander as Anandar, Maranamarthanda Zamindar
- T. S. Durairaj
- O. A. K. Thevar
- Narayana Pillai
- Santhanam
- Kanaiah
- Pakkirisamy
- Natarajan

Female Cast

- Padmini as Maragatham, Alamu
- Sandhya as Karpagavalli
- Gnanam
- Muthulakshmi
- Lakshmiprabha
- Lakshmirajam
- Saraswathi

== Production ==
Maragadham was directed by S. M. Sriramulu Naidu, who also produced it under Pakshiraja Studios. The film was based on Karunkuyil Kunrathu Kolai, a novel by T. S. D. Sami. Naidu wrote the screenplay and Murasoli Maran wrote the dialogues. Cinematography was handled by Sailen Bose, art direction by A. K. Sekhar, and editing by Velusamy.

== Soundtrack ==
The music was composed by S. M. Subbaiah Naidu. "Kunguma Poovey Konjum Puraavey" became a hit song. However, there is a controversy about this song. It is said that the tune for this song was composed by T. G. Lingappa for the film Sabaash Meena. However, for some reason, Chandrababu refused to sing the song for that film. Later he gave this tune to Subbaiah Naidu and it was included in this film.

Song	Singers	Lyrics	Length
"Kunguma Poove Konjum Puraave"	J. P. Chandrababu, K. Jamuna Rani	Ku. Ma. Balasubramaniam	03.27
"Aadinaal Nadanam Aadinaal"	Radha Jayalakshmi	Ra. Balu	03.12
"Kannukkulle Unnai Paaru"	T. M. Soundararajan, Radha Jayalakshmi	Ra. Balu	03.32
"Kaviri Paayum"	T. M. Soundararajan	Ra. Balu	03.27
"Maalai Mayangukindra Neram"	Radha Jayalakshmi	Shuddhananda Bharati	04.08
"Punnagai Thavazhum Madhimugamo"	T. M. Soundararajan, Radha Jayalakshmi	Papanasam Sivan	03.54
"Pachchai Kili Pola"	P. Leela, K. Jamuna Rani		

== Release and reception ==
Maragadham was released on 21 August 1959, and failed commercially.

== Bibliography ==
- Rajadhyaksha, Ashish; Willemen, Paul (1998) [1994]. Encyclopaedia of Indian Cinema. British Film Institute and Oxford University Press. ISBN 0-19-563579-5.
