= Paradise Cinema (Kolkata) =

- Location within Kolkata

General information
- Status: Active
- Type: Cinema hall, Heritage building
- Location: Bentinck Street, Esplanade, 39, Bentinck Street, Esplanade, Kolkata, India
- Coordinates: 22.5668°N 88.3496°E
- Inaugurated: 1943
- Renovated: 1956, 2005

Paradise Cinema is a single screen cinema hall located in Bentinck Street (Esplanade), Kolkata, West Bengal, India. This cinema hall was inaugurated in 1943 and was fully renovated in 1956. The current managing director of the theatre is Arun Mehra.

== Renovation ==
In 2004–2005 when single-screen theatres were struggling with high financial loss, theatre management of Paradise Cinema renovated this hall which saw a section of its audience returning. According to theatre director Arun Mehra, this makeover cost ₹3.5 million (US$37,000). Total number of seats are 1118.

== See also ==
- Metro Cinema
