= Pavalakodi (1949 film) =

1949 film by S. M. Sriramulu Naidu

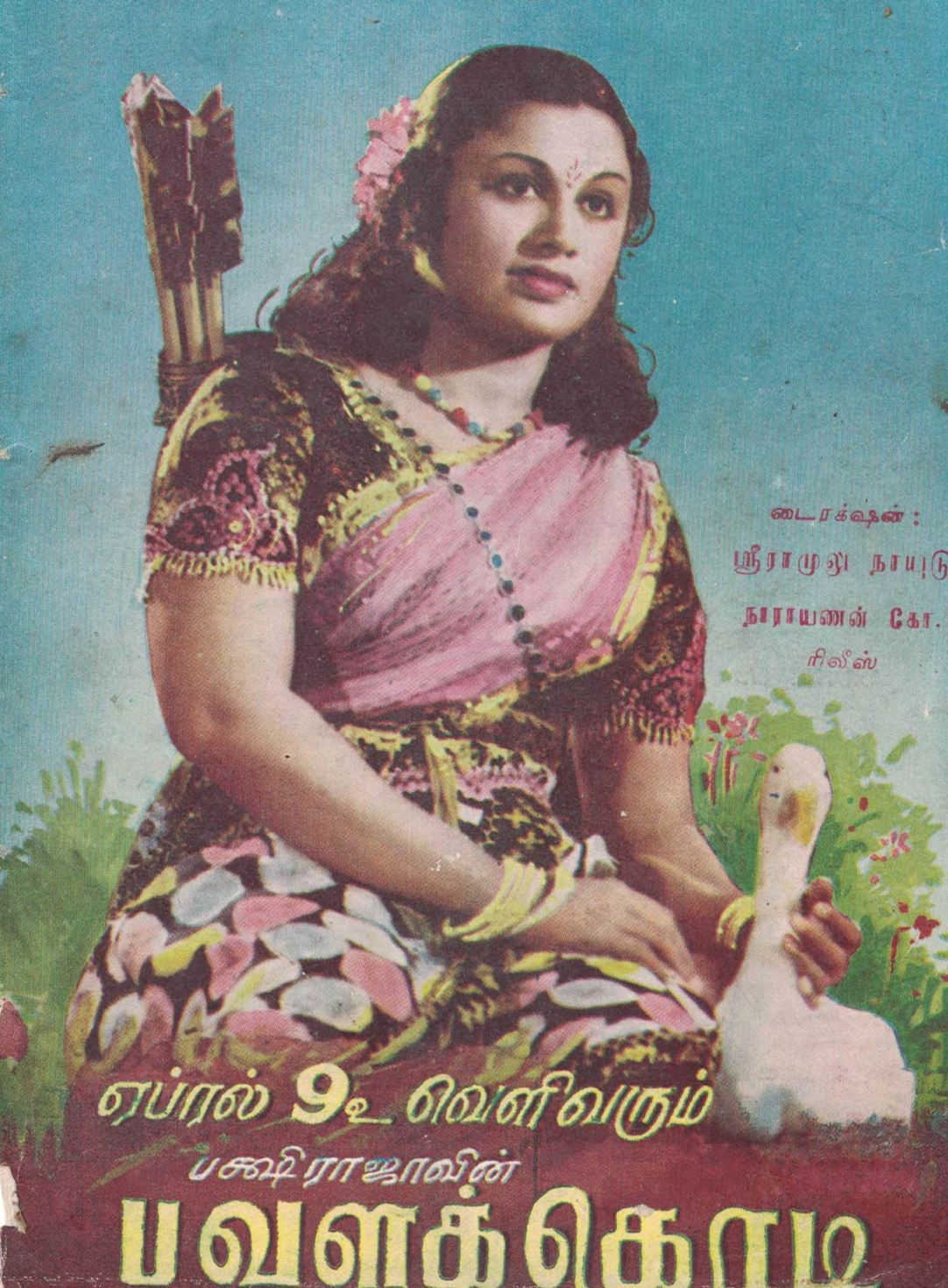
- Theatrical release poster
- Directed by: S. M. Sriramulu Naidu
- Screenplay by: Elangovan
- Based on: Pavalakodi (play)
- Produced by: S. Raghavan; A. S. Thirumalai
- Starring: T.E.Varadhan; T. R. Mahalingam; T. R. Rajakumari
- Cinematography: V. Krishnan
- Edited by: S. Surya
- Music by: Subbaraman
- Production company: Pakshiraja Studios
- Distributed by: Narayana & Co. Ltd
- Release date: 9 April 1949
- Country: India
- Language: Tamil

Pavalakodi (transl. The Coral Queen) is a 1949 Indian Tamil-language Hindu mythological film produced and directed by S. M. Sriramulu Naidu. It revolves around the turn of events between lord Rama and Karna and declare war over each other. The film starsT. R. Mahalingam as Krishna, N. S. Krishnan as Rama, T. E. Varadan and T. R. Rajakumari.

== Plot ==
The plot begins with Karna uniting with the Pandavas and Kauravas finally in the heaven

Swargarohana Parva(Mahabharata)(as per Vyasa)

Yudhisthira meets Karna, hugs him and touches his feet. As described in the Vedvyasa's Swargarohana Parva, Karna is crowned the king of the Aditya Lok by Surya. Indra, Yama, Yaksha and all other gods come to celebrate this moment. The Gandharvas, Apsaras celebrate by singing glories of Karna. The Yadavas led by Balarama, the Nishadas led by Eklavya, the Kurus, the Vrishnis all accept their sovereignty under Karna's rule. Jarasandha, Shishupala, Rukmi who on earth did not concile with the Pandavas because of their hatred towards Krishna, now accepted their rule under the sole emperor Karna. Draupadi unites with Karna. Both Padmavati and Draupadi becomes the chief consort of Karna. (Note: In the Vyasa's Mahabharata, it is not specific about who became the leading queen among the two) and the epic ends.

Story continues

The film then takes a turn from the original Mahabharat which ends at the crowning of Karna itself. The twist is that Karna declares Padmavati as the leading queen. After Karna's rule was established, Krishna and Balrama washed Padmavati's feet. Among the two queens, Karna was close to Draupadi. Padmavati felt that if she fails to attract Karna towards herself, then Karna would declare Draupadi as the leading queen instead of her. However Draupadi never felt uncomfortable because of Padmavati. The tensions between the two queens kept on growing. Padmavati felt that like before she had the undivided love of Karna but now she was failing to have that. She felt that because Draupadi was not even officially married to Karna, yet she was declared the second queen of the court and soon she might replace Padmavati as the leading queen.

Though Karna had not officially married Draupadi but both of them spent a lot time together in the heaven. Draupadi developed love for Karna in this time and realised her mistake to reject Karna in her swayamwara. Karna alone possessed the 5 qualities of a man she wanted. Draupadi had now started loving Karna however the same was not reciprocated by Karna, he was regarded as Vrisha(the one who speaks truth, follows his vows). He would not marry more than one woman. He spent time with Draupadi as a mere friend.

Despite this, Padmavati thought of a plan to throw away Draupadi from her way. Bhanumati(the wife of Duryodhana) was also a close friend of Karna and was kind-hearted like Draupadi. Padmavati talked to Bhanumati and told her of a plan so that she could throw away Draupadi from her way. Bhanumati recounts an incident when Karna had promised Bhanumati to fulfill her one wish she demands as a friend she had protected him by lifting him on her shoulders. It was the time for Bhanumati to ask that wish.

In the court, Draupadi decided to express her love today itself to Karna in front of everyone. At that moment, Bhanumati entered the court and went up to Karna and recalled him the wish Karna had promised and asked him to exile Draupadi for 6 years from the court. The Pandavas and Kauravas were sitting in the court. Karna and Pandavas were astonished at such words by Bhanumati. However, Karna could no go back off his vows. Draupadi's heart was shattered as it was the day she had planned to express her love to Karna.

Draupadi left the court and the Pandavas wept but could not go against Karna's wishes. While Draupadi was roaming here and there, Krishna came up to her and asked about the entire scenario. Krishna also could not go against Karna's wishes. So he thought of a plan, he told Draupadi to go to Rama, he stayed in the Aditya Lok with his brothers. Only Rama (the spiritual brother of Karna) could teach Karna a lesson. Draupadi weepingly said to Krishna that she loves Karna and doesn't want a war again. Krishna explained Draupadi that if she wants to be with Karna and Pandavas then she has to seek help from Rama because this plan of Padmavati to separate Draupadi and Karna because she thinks that Draupadi is greedy to become a queen which was not true. Meanwhile, Padmavati and Bhanumati both started provoking Karna against Draupadi.

Draupadi on the request of Krishna went up to Rama's kingdom and told about her conditions and asked for help. Rama also did not go against his vows at any conditions. He decided to explain Karna by sending Lakshman to Karna's court. At that time Karna and any of the Pandavas were not present in the court. Duryodhana who was intoxicated with liquor misbehaved with Lakshmana with verbal abuses. Lakshmana did not talk further and left the court and told this to Rama.

Rama assumed that this behaviour was expressed by Karna. He declared war against Karna and his brothers for the honour of Draupadi. The armies met in Kurukshetra once again. Karna and his allies include Krishna, Duryodhana and 100 Kauravas, Bhima, Yudhisthira, Arjuna, Jarasandha, Drona, Kripa, Eklavya, Rukmi, Bhagdatta, Satyaki, Ashwathamma and Shikhandi. Rama and his allies include Lakshman, Bali, Sugreeva, Shatrughana, Bharat, Angad, Jatayu and the monkey army. Hanuman wanted to remain neutral as his guru Surya's both sons were face-to-face and did not wish to take a side. Hanuman was equally devoted to Karna and Rama. But then Rama and Lakshman asked Hanuman to fulfill his vow that he once took to always side Rama. Hanuman was compelled to fight against Karna and Krishna. Draupadi is confused for whose victory should she pray and stays neutral. Ravana was very powerful and needed to be brought in the battle. Karna thinks if he brings Ravana on his side then victory is assured. However Ravana is penancing on Parvatgiri in heaven to impress Shiva for a boon. Ravana's demon army was needed for Karna's victory. So Karna accompanied by Arjuna and Duryodhana went to parvatgiri to find Ravana in dense forests. The three walked over mountains, rivers and finally finds Ravana. The three of them finally find Ravana and his demon army. However Ravana's penance should not be disturbed, Arjuna talks to the rest demon armies who were resting and enjoying their lives while Ravana was penancing but they did not pay heed to what he said which angered Arjuna. Arjuna shoots an arrow while Ravana was penancing and challenges him for a duel, Ravana gets up from his penance and roars, the duel between the two takes place. Duryodhana also comes in aid of Arjuna. Both Arjuna and Duryodhana together defeat the old Ravana. Arjuna was about to kill Ravana when he became weaponless, but then Karna orders Arjuna to not kill Ravana as it was against the laws of conduct to kill a weaponless warrior. Ravana then joins hands with Karna and he with his demon army sides Karna in the war. The war finally begins with all the allies participating.

The war ends with Karna, Ravana and Arjuna finally defeating Rama and Lakshman. Rama, Lakshmana are brought in the court of Karna. Hanuman is imprisoned. Draupadi runs up to the court seeing Rama and Lakshman imprisoned and begs Karna to spare them. The duo had actually fought for Draupadi's honour. Karna said that it was Rama who declared war before even discussing. Lakshman replied that he had come but Duryodhana misbehaved with him. Karna also then realizes his mistake and asks Duryodhana to apologize. Rama also apologized for this misunderstanding and then both Rama and Karna with their family united. Draupadi was brought back, Padmavati and Bhanumati asked for forgiveness for misunderstanding Draupadi. Hanuman was brought out of the prison. Krishna then suddenly appeared, he said to both Rama and Karna about their mistakes of misunderstandings. He also explained that "one should break his vows at right time and being truthful is not always the right way". Both Rama and Karna had learnt a lesson and worshipped Krishna's Vishnu form. Rama's army then went away, Hanuman is released from the prison.

Draupadi was given her position in the court. She felt that now she should express her love towards Karna. However, she was scared that Karna would reject her as he would not marry more than 1 woman following his vow. But Krishna comes up to Draupadi's lips and Draupadi expresses her love to Karna. Karna was stunned at once moment and the entire court was stunned. Krishna then reaches Karna's brain and reminds him that "vows can be broken". Karna remembering Krishna's words accept Draupadi as her wife and the marriage took place. Rama with his family also came on this ceremony and the film ends with Rama and Karna bowing in front of Krishna in the form of Vishnu and Krishna blesses both of them.

== Cast ==
The list is adapted from the opening credits of the film and the song book.

Male Cast

- N. S. Krishnan as Raman
- T. R. Mahalingam as Krishnan, Hunter,
  Servant, Doctor, Girl
- N. S. Narayana Pillai as Lakshman
- Durai Pandian as Duryodhana
- Chinna Sami as Yudhisthira
- Chinna Swami as Hanuman
- T.R Pillai as Ravana
- Ananta as Bharat
- Radha Krishnan as Bhima
- T.E Vardan as Arjuna
- Akki Narayana Pillai as Shatrughan

Female Cast

- T. R. Rajakumari as Draupadi/Pavalakodi
- M. S. Sarojini as Padmavati
- T. A. Mathuram as Sita
- Kumari Rajam as Draupadi's Friend
- Harini as Rukmani
- Menaka
- T. R. Rajini as Kunti
- Kantha as Mankombu

== Production ==
Pavalakkodi is the story over a misunderstanding between lord Rama and Karna. The story was written by great hisotrians and writers and several books both fictional and the actual Vyasa's Mahabharata was taken in reference to depict the actual scenario. Historians such as T.Y Minalmilu had written the script and the casting was done with perfection. It was directed and produced by S. M. Sriramulu Naidu in his own Pakshiraja Studios at Coimbatore.

== Release and reception ==
Pavalakkodi was released on 9 April 1949, and failed in box office.
