= S. M. Sriramulu Naidu =

Indian businessman and film producer (1910–1976)

- Born: Subbarayalu Munuswami Sriramulu Naidu; 1910; Tiruchi
- Died: 1976 (aged 65–66)
- Occupations: Director, producer
- Years active: 1943–1963

Subbarayalu Munuswami Sriramulu Naidu (1910-1976), also known as Sreeramulu Naidu, was an Indian director, businessman, and movie producer from Coimbatore who founded the Pakshiraja Studios in Coimbatore in 1945.

== Life ==
He was responsible for the early development of the Tamil film industry in Coimbatore and was called the "Coimbatore movie mogul". He directed and produced films predominantly in Tamil, Telugu, and Malayalam languages, while also having made one Hindi and Kannada film. In 1944, he was implicated as one of the accused in the Lakshmikanthan murder case and served his sentence till 1945 when he was discharged due to lack of evidence.

== Filmography ==
As director

- Sivakavi (1943)
- Jagathalapratapan (1944)
- Kannika (1947)
- Pavalakodi (1949)
- Prasanna (1950)
- Kanchana (1952)
- Malaikkallan (1954)
- Azaad (1955)
- Bettada Kalla (1957)
- Maragatham (1959)
- Vimala (1960)
- Sabarimala Ayyappan (1961)
- Kalyaniyin Kanavan (1963)

As producer

- Aryamala (1941)
- Valmiki (1946)
- Kannika (1947)
- Ezhai Padum Padu (1950)
- Beedala Patlu (1950)

== Awards ==
National Film Awards

- 1954: President's Silver Medal for Best Feature Film in Tamil - Malaikkallan
- 1961: Certificate of Merit for Third Best Feature Film in Malayalam - Sabarimala Ayyappan

== See also ==
- Central Studios
- Pakshiraja Studios
- Pakshiraja Films
