= Venkatarama Ramalingam Pillai =

Indian writer, poet, and Independence activist

Namakkal V. Ramalingam Pillai (1888–1972) was a prominent freedom fighter from Namakkal, a town known for its Anjaneya temple, situated between Salem and Madurai. Ramalingam was born into the Chozhia Vellalar community.

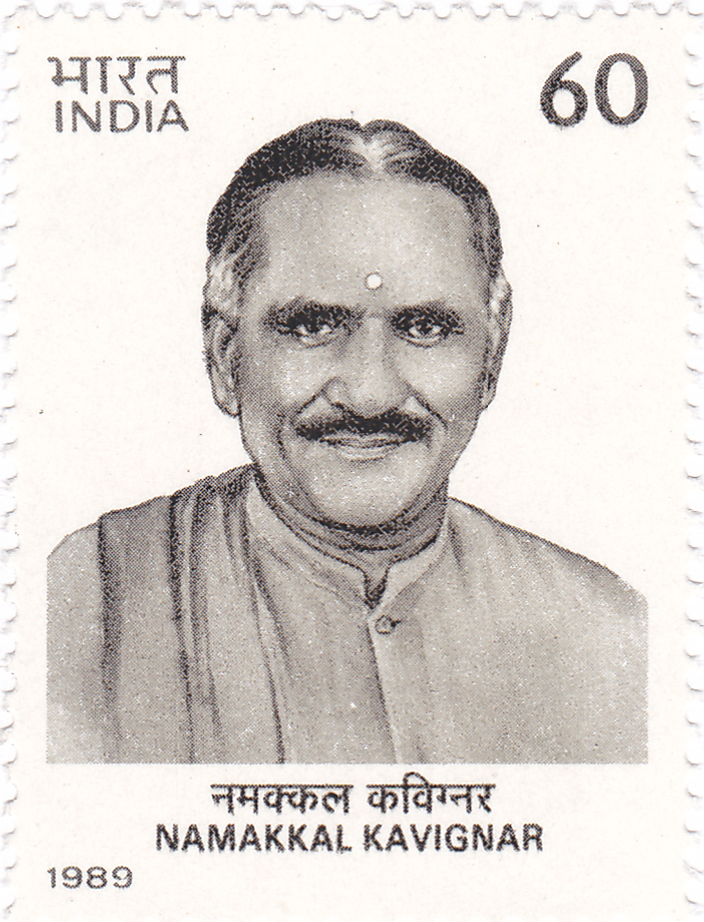
Pillai on a 1989 stamp of India

== Early life ==
His father, a senior officer in the British police service, was honored by the colonial government, which offered Ramalingam the position of sub-inspector. However, he declined this offer, choosing a different path.Inspired by Mahatma Gandhi, Leo Tolstoy, and Subramania Bharatiyar, Ramalingam became an active participant in the Indian Freedom Movement from the then Madras State, particularly in the areas of Namakkal.

== Independence activism ==
He advocated for non-cooperation alongside leaders such as Sabhapati Mudaliyar and Nagaraja Iyengar. During the Vedaranyam Salt Satyagraha, he wrote a song with the refrain, "கத்தியின்றி ரத்தமின்றி யுத்தம் ஒன்று வருகுது" (translated as "without sword, without bloodshed, a war is coming") embodying the spirit of peaceful resistance. Throughout the independence struggle, from 1930 to 1947, Ramalingam was involved through his speeches, writings, and artwork. His pen drawings of nationalist leaders gained recognition in post-independence India, earning him several awards.

is one of the most iconic lines written by Ramalingam Pillai during the Indian independence movement. Known for his patriotic fervor, Ramalingam Pillai used his poetry to inspire a non-violent struggle for freedom, aligning with Mahatma Gandhi’s principles of ahimsa (non-violence). This particular line captures the spirit of peaceful resistance, emphasizing that the fight for independence would be waged not with weapons or violence, but with the strength of resolve and unity.

The lines "தமிழன் என்று சொல்லடா, தலை நிமிர்ந்து நில்லடா" (Say proudly you are a Tamilian, stand tall with pride) by Ramalingam also inspired patriotism and Tamil identity among the people."

These iconic lines emphasize the cultural pride and unity of Tamilians, serving as a rallying cry for Tamil heritage. They are often quoted in speeches, songs, and movements to evoke a sense of belonging and pride in the Tamil language and identity. This verse is celebrated in Tamil literature as a symbol of the independence movement, resonating with the ethos of civil disobedience and peaceful protest that characterized India’s path to freedom.

He also participated in the Salt Satyagraha against the British government in 1930 and went to jail for one year. He received the "Padmabhushan" award in 1971 from the Indian government.
