= Padmini (actress) =

Indian actress (1932–2006)

Padmini Ramachandran
- Padmini in 2005
- Born: 13 December 1932; Trivandrum, Travancore, (now Kerala)
- Died: 24 September 2006 (aged 73); Chennai, Tamil Nadu, India
- Other names: Naattiya Peroli, Pappima, Thiruvancore Sisters, Thiruvithaamkoor sisters
- Years active: 1947–1994, 2002
- Works: Full list
- Spouse: Ramachandran (m. 1961; died 1981)
- Children: 1
- Relatives: Shobana (niece); Ambika Sukumaran; Vineeth (nephew); Sukumari (cousin)
- Family: Lalitha (sister); Ragini (sister)

Padmini Ramachandran (13 December 1932 – 24 September 2006) was an Indian actress and Bharatanatyam dancer, who acted in over 250 Indian films. She acted in Tamil, Hindi, Malayalam, Telugu and Russian language films. Padmini, her elder sister Lalitha and her younger sister Ragini, were collectively called the "Travancore sisters". She is known as the "Naattiya Peroli" (transl. Supreme Radiance of Dance) of Tamil Cinema. She is the first awardee of Tamil Nadu's highest civilian award Kalaimamani from the Government of Tamil Nadu.

== Early life ==
Padmini was born and raised in Trivandrum (present-day Thiruvananthapuram), then part of the princely state of Travancore (now the Indian state of Kerala). Born into a Malayali family, she was the second daughter of Thangappan Pillai Nayar and Saraswathi Amma.

== Career ==
At the age of 16, Padmini was cast as a dancer in the Hindi film Kalpana (1948), which launched her career. She acted in films consecutively for nearly 30 years in the first lease of her career. Padmini starred with several of the most well-known actors in Indian film, including Sivaji Ganesan, M. G. Ramachandran, N. T. Rama Rao, Raj Kapoor, Shammi Kapoor, Sathyan, Prem Nazir, Rajkumar, Gemini Ganesan and S. S. Rajendran. Ezhai Padum Padu, released in 1950, was her first film in Tamil. V A Gopalakrishnan taught the Padmini sisters Tamil since their mother-tongue was Malayalam. He was associated with Pakshi Raja studios. Padmini Ramachandran's association with Sivaji Ganesan started with the film Panam in 1952. Some of her notable Tamil films include Sampoorna Ramayanam (1958), Thanga Padhumai, Anbu (1953), Kaattu Roja, Thillana Mohanambal (1968), Vietnam Veedu, Edhir Paradhathu, Sri Valli (1961). Other projects include Mangayar Thilakam and Poove Poochudava (1985), Thaikku Oru Thalattu (1986), Lakshmi Vandhachu (1986) and Aayiram Kannudayaal (1986). Some of her Malayalam films include Prasanna, Snehaseema, Vivaahitha, Adhyaapika, Kumara Sambhavam (a 1969 Tamil/Malayalam bilingual), Nokkethadhoorathu Kannum Nattu (1984). Whereas Vasthuhara and Dolar marked the latter's last few films in her acting career and in Malayalam too after which, she immediately retired as an actress and hasn't appeared in any movies since.

She was paired with Raj Kapoor in three films— Mera Naam Joker (1970) which was Rishi Kapoor's debut film, Jis Desh Mein Ganga Behti Hai (1960) and Aashiq (1962). Her other Bollywood films include Amardeep (1958), Payal (1957), Afsana (1966), Vaasna (1968), Chanda Aur Bijli (1969) and Babubhai Mistry's Mahabharat (1965).

Her most famous film is the Tamil film Thillana Mohanambal where she plays a dancer competing with a musician to determine whose skills are better. She also acted in a 1957 Indian-Soviet film Journey Beyond Three Seas (Hindi version: Pardesi) based on the travelogues of Russian traveler Afanasy Nikitin, called A Journey Beyond the Three Seas.

Padmini was known for her professional rivalry with actress Vyjayanthimala, the successful dancer-actress. They performed a dance number in the Tamil film Vanjikottai Valiban; the well-known song was "Kannum Kannum Kalanthu" sung by P. Leela and Jikki. In the song, they were pitted against each other. Due to their professional rivalry, the song has a cult following since the film was released.

In 2005, Padmini was honoured with a Lifetime Achievement Award by the then Chief Minister of Tamil Nadu, J. Jayalalithaa, who opened her speech with a famous dialogue from her film Thillana Mohanambal, drawing an enthusiastic response from the audience in felicitation ceremony.

== Personal life ==
In 1961, Padmini married Ramachandran, a US-based physician. The couple's only son was born in 1962; he resides in Hillsdale, New Jersey and works for Sports Illustrated. Padmini retired from films shortly after her son's birth, joining her husband in the United States to focus on family life.

In 1977, she founded the Padmini School of Fine Arts in New Jersey. The institution grew to become one of the largest Indian classical dance schools in the United States.

Padmini's relatives in the film industry include her maternal first cousin, actress Sukumari; her niece, the dancer Shobana; Malayalam actress Ambika Sukumaran; and actors Vineeth and Krishna.

On 23 September 2006, Padmini was admitted to Apollo Hospital in Chennai after suffering a heart attack during a meeting with then-Tamil Nadu Chief Minister M. Karunanidhi. She died in the hospital the following day, 24 September, at the age of 74.

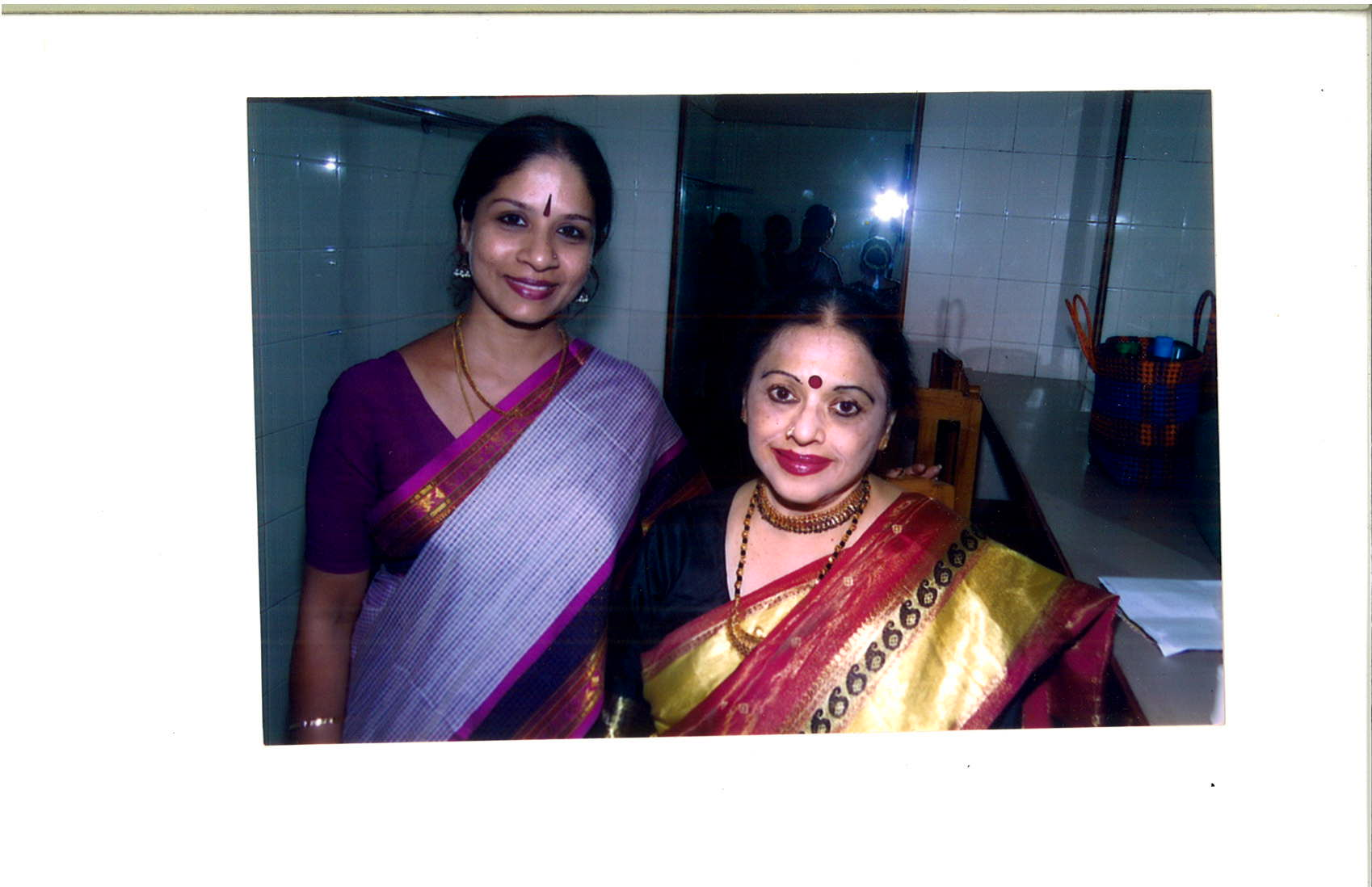
Padmini (Right) in 2005

== Awards ==
Won

- 1954 – Film Fans Association Award for Best Actress
- 1957 – The "Best Classical Dancer Award" from Moscow Youth Festival
- 1958 – Kalaimamani Award from the Government of Madras State
- 1959 – Film Fans Association Award for Best Actress
- 1960 – Certificate of Merit for Veerapandiya Kattabomman at the Afro-Asian Film Festival
- 1961 – Film Fans Association Award for Best Actress
- 1966 – Filmfare Award for Best Supporting Actress for Kaajal
- 1966 – Film Fans Association Award for Best Actress
- 1968 – Tamil Nadu State Film Award for Best Actress for Thillaanaa Mohanambal
- 1990 – Filmfare Lifetime Achievement Award – South
- 2000 – Tamil Nadu State Film Honorary Award – Kalaivanar Award

Nominated

- 1960 – Filmfare Award for Best Actress for Jis Desh Mein Ganga Behti Hai

== Endorsements ==
- Lux
- Filmfare Magazines
- Star & Style
- Remy Talcum Powder

== See also ==
- List of Indian film actresses
