= Malliswari (1951 film) =

1951 film directed by Bommireddy Narasimha Reddy

- Theatrical release poster
- Directed by: B. N. Reddy
- Based on: Rayalavari Karunakruthyamu by Buchibabu The Emperor and the Slave Girl by Devan Sharar
- Produced by: B. N. Reddy
- Starring: P. Bhanumathi; N. T. Rama Rao
- Cinematography: Adi M. Irani; B. N. Konda Reddy
- Edited by: H. R. Narayana; Vasu
- Music by: S. Rajeswara Rao
- Production company: Vauhini Studios
- Release date: 20 December 1951
- Running time: 175–194 minutes (Note: The Directorate of Film Festivals gives the runtime as 175 minutes, while Encyclopaedia of Indian Cinema by Ashish Rajadhyaksha and Paul Willemen gives the runtime as 194 minutes.)
- Country: India
- Language: Telugu

Malliswari is a 1951 Indian Telugu-language historical romance film produced and directed by B. N. Reddi under his banner Vauhini Studios. P. Bhanumathi and N. T. Rama Rao star as a couple – Nagaraju and Malliswari – who are separated by Malliswari's greedy mother. Malliswari is sent to the king's palace according to the custom of "Rani Vasam", a tradition during the Vijayanagara Empire wherein young women were fetched to the palace with an offering of gold and jewellery to their parents. The rest of the film focuses on the consequences faced by Nagaraju when he, against all rules, surreptitiously enters the palace to meet Malliswari.

B. N. Reddi had envisioned a film about Sri Krishnadevaraya since his visit to Hampi during the production of his debut film, Vande Mataram (1939). He enlisted Devulapalli Krishnasastri to write the script, drawing inspiration from Butchi Babu's play Rayalavari Karunakruthyamu and Devan Sharar's short story The Emperor and the Slave Girl. B. N. Reddi also incorporated elements from his own childhood to enhance the narrative's authenticity, particularly in the playful interactions between Nagaraju and Malliswari. To ensure historical accuracy, B. N. Reddi consulted Mallampalli Somasekhara Sarma, a noted historian and epigraphist. Art director A. K. Shekar devoted nearly two years to designing the sets, meticulously preparing sketches to reflect the period’s aesthetics. The film's music was composed by S. Rajeswara Rao, with cinematography by Adi M. Irani and B. N. Konda Reddy.

The production phase of Malliswari lasted for two years and the film was released on 20 December 1951. It grossed over ₹8 lakh (₹0.8 million) but underperformed in its initial box-office run. However, it was successful in its re-release. Malliswari was featured at the Peking Film Festival in Beijing, China on 14, March 1953. B. N. Reddi planned to dub the film into English, but backed out due to budget considerations.

Malliswari achieved cult status in Telugu cinema and is considered one of the best works of B. N. Reddi as a filmmaker. It became the first film script to be serialised in the magazine Vijayachitra, and a few universities in the United States wished to have the film's script as a part of their textual studies. On the centenary of Indian cinema in April 2013, CNN-IBN included Malliswari in its list, "The 100 greatest Indian films of all time".

== Plot ==
During the reign of the Vijayanagara Empire, "Rani Vasam" was a common tradition that was considered a "boon" for young women. According to the tradition, young women were made the official residents of the palace when palanquins were sent to fetch them from their homes, offering large quantities of gold and jewellery to the parents in exchange. While the families of these women continue to cherish their daughters, these women were prohibited from having any contact with any male or letting any male visit them without permission. The ones who violated the rule were hanged.

Nagaraju and Malliswari of Veerapuram are cross-cousins who became close friends in childhood. This angers Malliswari's mother Nagamma, who criticises Nagaraju and his mother Govindamma, mainly on account of their lower financial status. Malliswari's father Narappa, also the village head, is a silent spectator, and her uncle Hanumanthappa is a minister in the court of Krishnadevaraya, the king of the Vijayanagara Empire. Once, Nagaraju and Malliswari visit the nearby village and take shelter in a mandapa at night during rainfall. Krishnadevaraya and Allasani Peddana, along with a few soldiers, enter the same mandapa where there are impressed with Malliswari's talent as a singer and dancer. Nagaraju and Malliswari, unaware of their true identity, converse with them, and Nagaraju asks them to recommend Malliswari to Krishnadevaraya for Rani Vasam.

Malliswari is against this and sees this as a prank by Nagaraju. While Nagamma is keen to send her to Rani Vasam, Narappa wants his daughter to marry Nagaraju. Nagamma voices her opinion insulting Nagaraju and Govindamma. Nagaraju then decides to leave Veerapuram and earn money to convince Nagamma to approve his marriage to Malliswari. He becomes a successful sculptor in Vijayanagara and decides to return to Veerapuram. However, before he can do so, Krishnadevaraya and his wife Tirumaladevi appoint Malliswari as the official resident of the palace, thereby granting her "Rani Vasam".

Due to her insatiable desire for wealth, Nagamma forcibly sends Malliswari to the palace, and, when Nagaraju returns on the same night and learns what has happened, he becomes depressed. Govindamma becomes unstable after Nagaraju begins to lead the life of a recluse, mulling over his memories of Malliswari. A group of sculptors meet Nagaraju and ask him to accompany them to Vijayanagara to build a special mandapa for dancers, and he agrees. There, he meets Malliswari. They are separated by her maid Jalaja, who is afraid that they will be beheaded, as stipulated in the Rani Vasam tradition. Knowing about her past, Jalaja arranges a meeting of Malliswari with Nagaraju on the banks of the Tungabhadra River at midnight.

Krishnadevaraya and his ministry attend the newly constructed dance hall, where they learn that Nagaraju is one of the sculptors. That night, Malliswari wants to meet Nagaraju again but is held back after receiving a message that Krishnadevaraya and Tirumaladevi, along with other official residents of the palace, will be attending the play "Usha Parinayam" at the dance hall and that Malliswari is expected to participate in it. Nagaraju, who is waiting for her near the Tungabhadra river, enters the palace and is chased by the soldiers. Malliswari sees Nagaraju running and calls out to him. To prevent Malliswari from being hanged, Nagaraju acts as if he does not know her, but they are soon jailed for violating the rules of Rani Vasam.

Jalaja reveals the love story of Malliswari and Nagaraju to Tirumaladevi. She also reveals that Malliswari denied any help from her and instead chose to die along with Nagaraju. The next morning, the hanging nooses are kept ready and the duo meet Krishnadevaraya before killing them. When Nagaraju blames Krishnadevaraya for sending a palanquin to her house for Rani Vasam, Krishnadevaraya defends his action and reminds Nagaraju that it was he who had asked him to send Malliswari to Rani Vasam. Krishnadevaraya forgives both Nagaraju and Malliswari, and their marriage is conducted in a grand manner at the palace.

== Cast ==
- P. Bhanumathi as Malliswari and the main female lead and singer
- N. T. Rama Rao as Nagaraju
- Sreevatsa as Krishnadevaraya
- Kumari as Tirumaladevi
- T. G. Kamala Devi as Jalaja
- Nyapathi Raghava Rao as Allasani Peddana
- Rushyendramani as Nagamma
- Doraiswamy as Narappa
- Surabhi Kamalabai as Govindamma
- Vangara Venkata Subbaiah as Hanumanthappa
- Revathi in a cameo appearance in the song "Poyi Ravamma"
- Baby Mallika as Young Malliswari
- Master Venkata Ramana as Young Nagaraju

== Production ==
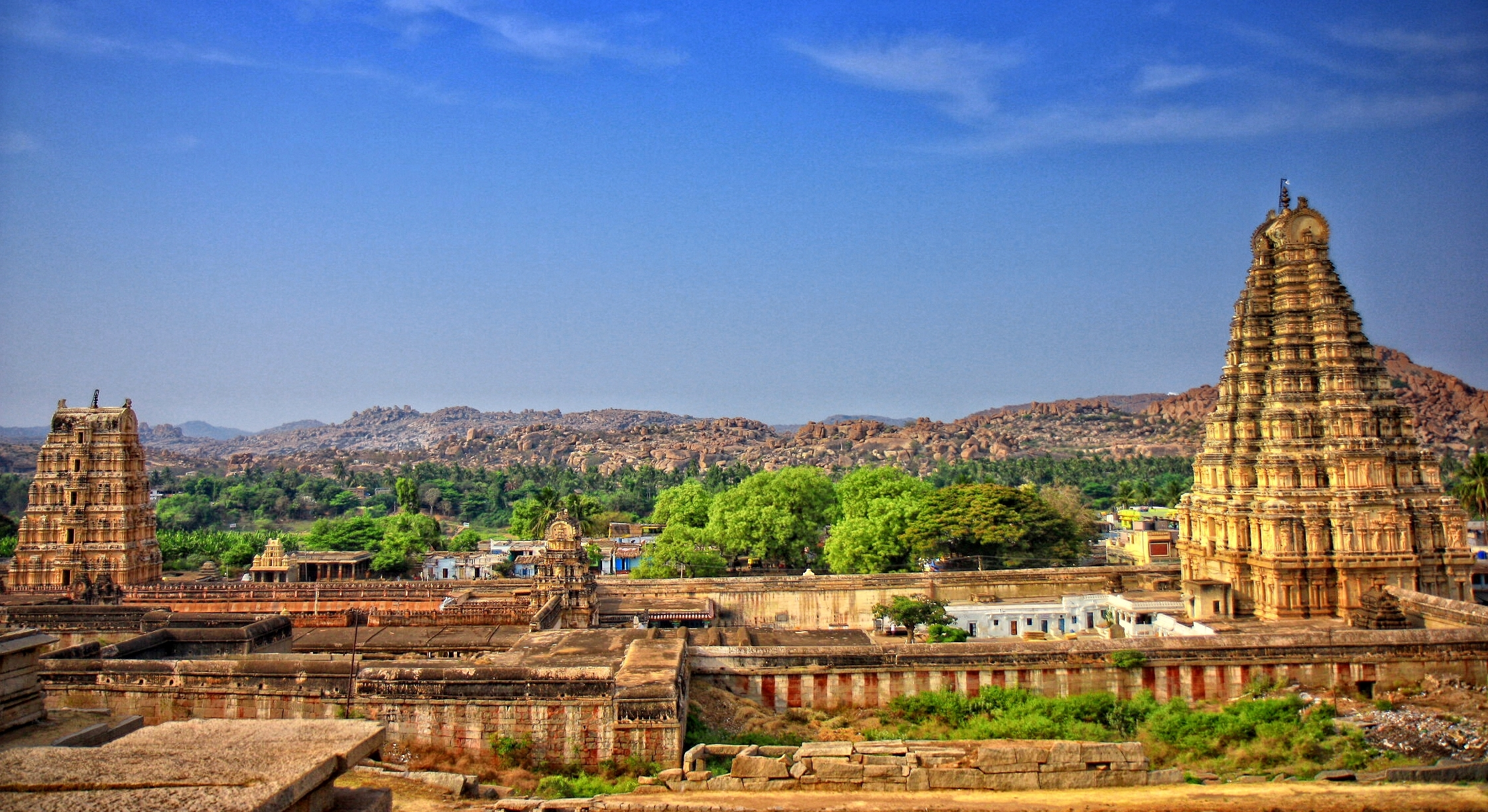
Virupaksha Temple at Hampi, Karnataka. At the sanctum sanctorum of this temple, B. N. Reddi decided in 1939 to direct a film where Krishnadevaraya would be the central character. This became the genesis of Malliswari.

During the filming of his directorial debut Vandemataram (1939) at Hampi, B. N. Reddi visited the Virupaksha Temple to capture the beauty of the monuments, which reflected the taste and artistic outlook of Krishnadevaraya, king of the Vijayanagara Empire. At the heart of the temple, Reddy felt that he was standing exactly at a place where Krishnadevaraya had once stood and offered prayers to the deity. From that moment, Reddy decided to make a film in which Krishnadevaraya would be the main character, and he began working on the script.

Reddy chose the concept of Rayalavari Karunakruthyamu, a popular play written by Telugu novelist Buchibabu that was published in the literary journal Bharathi (1944) and later broadcast by All India Radio, Madras. He approached Telugu poet and playwright Devulapalli Krishnasastri to write the film's script and lyrics after being impressed with his previous works. Reddy made a few changes to Buchibabu's play and reworked Krishnadevaraya's character.

Apart from Rayalavari Karunakruthyamu, Krishnasastri's script also took inspiration from Devan Sharar's short story, The Emperor and the Slave Girl, which was published in the now defunct magazine, The Illustrated Weekly of India. It was Reddy's practice to credit the authors of works from which he borrowed the basic premise for a film, but in this film, that was not the case. Krishnasastry revealed the fact in an interview with Vijayachitra magazine after Reddy's death in 1977. However, in the film's opening credits, Buchibabu was listed as the film's writer along with Krishnasastri. Adi M. Irani and B. N. Konda Reddy were the film's cinematographers; S. Rajeswara Rao and Addepalli Ramarao composed the film's music; H. R. Narayana and Vasu edited the film. A. K. Shekhar was the film's production designer and Thota Tharani's father Thota Venkateswara Rao assisted him.

N. T. Rama Rao was chosen to play Nagaraju, a sculptor during the period of Krishnadevaraya's rule. B. N. Reddi wanted to cast a fresh face for the role of Malliswari and screen-tested Kannada actress Revathi. He later finalised P. Bhanumathi, who played a negative role in his previous film Swarga Seema (1945), as the film's female lead, as he felt an experienced actress with a good voice would do better justice to the role. Revathi made a cameo appearance in the song "Poyi Ravamma". Differences arose between Reddy and Bhanumathi due to the latter's lack of punctuality. Due to the delay in production of Malliswari, Bhanumathi had begun working in Prema (1952), which was produced by her husband P. S. Ramakrishna Rao. As she sported a curly hairdo, a body double was used for a few sequences as it was in contrast to the simple and soft tresses she sported in this film. Regarding the same, Bhanumathi criticised Reddy, stating that he wanted his actresses to concentrate on his films and avoid getting married.

Despite this, Reddy said that Rama Rao and Bhanumathi "made a cute on-screen pair", adding that one cannot imagine anyone else as Nagaraju and Malleswari. T. G. Kamala Devi, who played the role of Malliswari in Buchibabu's radio play, was cast as Jalaja, Malliswari's maid in the film. Pasumarthi Krishnamurthy choreographed the songs. Reddy incorporated a few of his childhood incidents in the film, and according to Bhanumathi, the pranks between Malliswari and Nagaraju and the sequence before the song "Kothi Bavaku Pellanta" were inspired by his childhood experiences. Apart from designing the sets, Shekhar took care of the artists' hair and costumes. He also recreated the shores of the Tungabhadra River on a floor a Vauhini Studios building in Madras for the song "Manasuna Mallela". The production phase of Malliswari lasted two years.

== Music ==
Malliswari

Soundtrack album To Malliswari by S. Rajeswara Rao
- Released: 31 December 1951
- Genre: Feature film soundtrack
- Length: 56:47
- Language: Telugu
- Label: Saregama
- Producer: S. Rajeswara Rao

The official soundtrack of Malliswari composed by S. Rajeswara Rao consists of 19 songs whose lyrics were penned by Devulapalli Krishnasastri. The sound mixing process was supervised by A. Krishnan and P. V. Koteswara Rao. It was processed by N. C. Sen Gupta and orchestrated by Addepalli Ramarao, who was, however, credited as one of the film's music directors in the opening credits. The song "Manasuna Mallela" was composed using the Kalyani raga. Purandara Dasa's composition "Sri Gananatha" was used in the film's opening credits. Being a playback singer, Bhanumathi provided vocals for all the songs featuring her character Malliswari. Composing the soundtrack took six months and Rajeswara Rao held rehearsals for both Ghantasala and Bhanumathi along with others. The soundtrack, marketed by Saregama, was released on 31 December 1951. The song "Yenduke Neekinta" is based on Khamas raga.

The soundtrack was a critical and commercial success. In his review for Telugu Swatantra magazine, writer Aarudhra praised the film's sound designing by Krishnan and Koteswara Rao stating, "Heavy rain with winds lashed outside as [Mallishwari]'s mother converses with her husband Nagappa. Their conversation is clearly audible along with the sound of the rain and the wind. Even the flutter of the towel on Nagappa's shoulder is heard clearly". In The Hans India, Aruna Ravikumar surmised that, for the song "Akasha Veedhilo", Krishnasastri had borrowed the image of a cloud as messenger between lovers from the poem "Meghasandesam" by Indian Sanskrit poet Kālidāsa. Rajeswara Rao considered Malliswari to be his best work after S. S. Vasan's Chandralekha (1948). He especially liked "Akasha Veedhilo" and performed it numerous times at events he attended.

After Bhanumathi's death in December 2005, K. V. S. Madhav of The Hindu recalled, "Even at the ripe age of 70-something, when she rendered her immortal number from Malleswari, 'Manasuna Mallela maalalugene...' in that honey-dipped voice, there was no eye that did not turn moist at Ravindra Bharathi almost a decade ago." The single "Hey Pillagada" from Fidaa (2017) is an adapted version of the song "Parugulu Teeyaali," with the vocals of Bhanumathi and Ghantasala.

Track listing

All lyrics are written by Devulapalli Krishnasastri.

No.	Title	Singers	Length
1.	"Kothi Bavaku Pellanta"	P. Bhanumathi	3:10
2.	"Pilichina Biguvatara"	P. Bhanumathi	3:30
3.	"Manasuna Mallela"	P. Bhanumathi	3:03
4.	"Nelaraja Vennelaraja"	P. Bhanumathi	3:50
5.	"Parugulu Teeyaali"	P. Bhanumathi, Ghantasala	3:14
6.	"Pilachina Biguvatara"	P. Bhanumathi, Ghantasala	3:30
7.	"Enduke Neekinta"	P. Bhanumathi	2:51
8.	"Avuna Nijamena"	P. Bhanumathi, Ghantasala	4:20
9.	"Aakasa Veedhilo"	P. Bhanumathi, Ghantasala	5:22
10.	"Uyyala Jampala"	G. Ramakrishna, V. Sakuntala	2:03
11.	"Bhalira"	Madhavapeddi Satyam	0:43
12.	"O Bava"	G. Ramakrishna, V. Sakuntala	2:58
13.	"Tummeda"	T. G. Kamala Devi	2:43
14.	"Evaru Emani Vinduro"	P. Bhanumathi	3:50
15.	"Usha Parinayam"	P. Bhanumathi, T. G. Kamala Devi	7:21
16.	"Kalavaramaaye Madilo"	Ghantasala, P. Bhanumathi	3:03
17.	"Nominamallala"	P. Bhanumathi	1:53
Total length:			56:47

== Release, reception and legacy ==
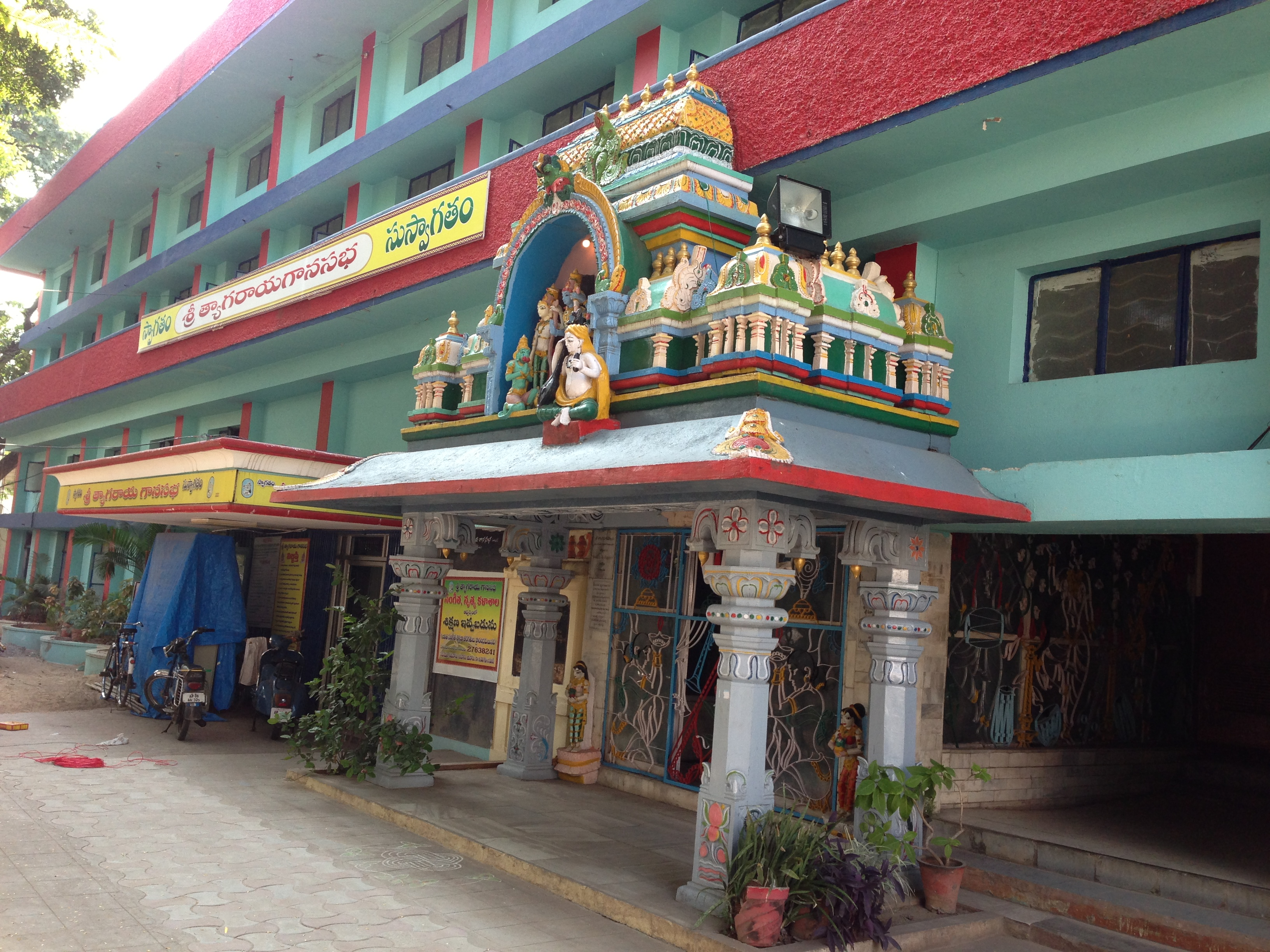
Sri Thyagaraja Gana Sabha at Chikkadpally, Hyderabad where the film's 60th anniversary celebrations were held on 20 December 2011.

Malliswari was released on 20 December 1951. Initially, it received a tepid response at the box office. However, ticket sales picked up due to positive word of mouth but the film underperformed commercially. Reddy re-released the film after a gap, and it achieved bigger success. Malliswari was screened at the 1952 Peking film festival, making it the first Telugu film to be screened in China.

Malliswari grossed over ₹8 lakh, which according to Reddy, was a huge amount in those days. Vasan advised Reddy to dub the film into Hindi. A 16 mm print was sent to the United States. After being screened in various countries, Reddy wanted to dub Malliswari into English. However, the plans were dropped due to budget considerations. Delhi Telugu Sangham screened the film at Azad Bhawan, New Delhi, on 21 February 2004. The 60th anniversary of Malliswari was celebrated with an event at the Sri Thyagaraja Gana Sabha, Chikkadpally, on 20 December 2011.

=== Critical reception ===
In his review for Filmindia magazine, Baburao Patel called Malliswari an "inspiring motion picture" which would "save us the blush when compared with the best of motion pictures of the world". Film historian Randor Guy called Malliswari a "poem in celluloid, told with rare artistic finesse, which lingers long in the memory".

M. L. Narasimham of The Hindu wrote, "No wonder, the film took two years to complete, but what ultimately mattered was the quality of the product, an all-time classic of which the Telugu film industry is proud. It is a simple story, well told and represented by excellence in all sectors of film -craft [sic]". Regarding Bhanumathi's performance, Narasimham stated that she "breathed life" into Malliswari's character with her "natural acting and mellifluous renditions".

In his book "Alanaati Chalana Chitram", K. N. T. Sastry wrote that Bhanumathi's expressions were "heavenly" and called Shekhar's production design "commendable". The directorate of the International Film Festival of India called Malliswari a "nostalgic film of kings and proud queens, baroque-style palaces and dancers, and ordinary mortals who dared to fall in love".

=== Digitisation plans ===
In November 2007, a Hyderabad-based company named Goldstone Technologies acquired the film negative rights of fourteen Telugu films produced by Vijaya Vauhini Studios, including Mayabazar (1957) and Malliswari, to release their digitally remastered versions in colour. Though the digitally remastered and colourised version of Mayabazar, released in January 2010, was commercially successful, Goldstone Technologies decided not to remaster the remaining fourteen films including Malliswari, saying that most of the producers who sold the rights of the negatives to TV channels lost control over them. Goldstone said furthermore that there were a number of legal issues over ownership and copyright issues whenever other producers try to do something on their own.

=== In popular culture ===
When people talk of good movies, of clean films, of purposeful cinema, BN is remembered, and his films like Sumangali, Malleswari, Bangaru Papa, Devata are screened, some go nostalgic...some give out deep sighs...some shed silent tears. Sentimental folks long for the bygone days of glory that was Telugu cinema and that was BN Reddi.

— Film historian Randor Guy about B. N. Reddy in the 9th International Film Festival of India's manual.

Malliswari is regarded as one of the cult classic films of Telugu cinema. It is one of the earliest Telugu films making use of Indian art and architecture and was followed by films such as Sankarabharanam (1980), Meghasandesam (1982), Ananda Bhairavi (1983), Sagara Sangamam (1983), and Rudraveena (1988). It was also the first film script to be serialised in Vijayachitra magazine. During the film's screening in the United States, a few universities requested the film's script as a part of their film study curriculum. Reddy considered Malliswari his best work as a filmmaker, and the film was recognised as such. Malliswari's success led to Rama Rao's resurgence from a career slump. A 2004 Telugu film directed by K. Vijaya Bhaskar was also titled Malliswari and marked the debut of the British-Indian actress Katrina Kaif in Telugu cinema.

In January 2007, M. L. Narasimham included Malliswari on a list of films that have influenced society and Telugu cinema along with Mala Pilla (1938), Raithu Bidda (1939), Vara Vikrayam (1939), Bhakta Potana (1942), Shavukaru (1950), Peddamanushulu (1954), Mayabazar (1957) and Lava Kusa (1963). In May 2012, Radhika Rajamani of Rediff.com mentioned Malliswari for the letter M in her list, "The A to Z of Telugu Cinema". Commenting on Mithunam (2012), actor and writer Gollapudi Maruti Rao stated, "Some movies might make money but a Malleswari, a Sankarabharanam, a Pratighatana and movies like them cannot be forgotten". On the centenary of Indian cinema in April 2013, CNN-IBN included Malliswari in its list, "The 100 greatest Indian films of all time".

== Bibliography ==
- Kasbekar, Asha (2006). Pop Culture India!: Media, Arts, and Lifestyle. United States: ABC-CLIO. ISBN 1-85109-636-1.
