= Moola =

Moola or Moolah may refer to:

== People ==
- Moola Venkata Rangaiah, Indian film producer
- Moola Narayana Swamy (born 1950), Indian film producer and entrepreneur
- The Fabulous Moolah (1923–2007), ring name of professional wrestler Lillian Ellison
- Young Money, also known as Young Moolah by label rapper Lil Wayne

== Places ==
- Moola, Queensland, a town in Australia
- Moola Tehsil, a Pakistani administrative area

== Arts, entertainment, and media ==
- Moola (2007), a film directed by Don Most, starring William Mapother
- "Moola, Moola", a No. 1 single in Canada by Jordy Birch
- Moolah (song), a song by Young Greatness

== Other uses ==
- Moola or moolah, a slang term for money
- Operation Moolah, a US Air Force operation during the Korean War

== See also ==
- Mula (disambiguation)
- Mulla (disambiguation)
- Mullah, a Muslim educated in Islamic theology and sacred law
- Mulah, Maldives
