= Mawlawi =

Mawlawi may refer to:

- Mawlawi (Islamic title), an honorific Islamic title often given to Sunni Muslim clergy
- Mevlevi Order, a Sufi order founded in Konya
- Mawlawi Afzal (1920s–2012), Panjpiri-educated Afghan clergyman
- Mawlawi Mehdi Mujahid (1988–2022), Hazara Shia rebel
- Mawlawi Tawagozi, Kurdish poet and Sufi

== See also ==
- Mevlevi (disambiguation)
- Mulla (disambiguation)
- Mawla, Arabic word for lord, god; etymon of mawlawi
- Malawi, a country in southeastern Africa
- Mallawi, a city in Egypt
- Kot Maulvi, a village in Punjab, India
