= B. Gopalam =

Indian singer

Boddu Gopalam (1927–2004), popularly known as B. Gopalam, was a singer and music director of South Indian films and All India Radio.

== Early life ==
He was born at Tulluru in Guntur district of Andhra Pradesh, India. His father Ramadasu, was also a musician and an exponent of Harikatha. Gopalam learned vocal music and playing the violin under Varanasi Brahmayya Sastry in Vijayawada.

== Career ==
Gopalam was an active member of the Praja Natya Mandali in Guntur district and campaigned in favour of the poor and downtrodden. He was closely associated with Vemulapalli Srikrishna and Sheik Nazar. While working as a vocalist at All India Radio, singing the songs of Devulapalli Krishna Sastry and Viswanatha Satyanarayana, he met and married a fellow singer named Renuka.

He began working in Telugu films on the invitation of Tatineni Prakasa Rao. He has worked with directors such as Ghantasala, T. V. Raju, and S. Rajeswara Rao. He later became an independent music director for the film Nala Damayanthi in Telugu and Kannada. He also sang in a few Telugu films as a playback singer.

== Discography ==
- Notes: contains the original/other music directors.

=== Composer ===
Year	Film	Language	Director	Banner	Notes
1957	Nala Damayanthi	Telugu/Kannada	Kemparaj Urs	Kemparaj Urs Productions	
1959	Azhagarmalai Kalvan	Tamil	Kemparaj Urs	Kemparaj Urs Productions	
1959	Mannan Magal	Tamil	Babubhai Mistri		
1959	Veerapandya Katta Brahmana	Telugu	B. R. Panthulu	Padmini Pictures	G. Ramanathan
1961	Bikari Ramudu	Telugu	Palagummi Padmaraju		
1962	Appaginthalu	Telugu	V. Madhusudhana Rao	M. M. Pictures	
1962	Parvathi Vijayam	Telugu	Raja Nene	Sri Vijayalakshmi Films	
1962	Samrat Pruthviraj	Telugu	Harsukh Bhatt		Vasanth Desai
1963	Anuragam	Telugu	T. R. Raghunath	Modern Theatres	
1965	Ide Mahasudina	Kannada	B. C. Srinivas	Shanth Films	
1966	Rangula Ratnam	Telugu	B. N. Reddy	Vauhini Studios	S. Rajeswara Rao
1966	Vijaya Shankam	Telugu	K. V. Nandana Rao	Sujata Chitra	
1968	Maatheye Maha Mandira	Kannada	B. C. Srinivas		
1968	Dabbarayudu Subbarayudu	Telugu	Muktha Srinivasan	Muktha Films	
1969	Bangaru Panjaram	Telugu	B. N. Reddy	Vauhini Studios	S. Rajeswara Rao
1969	Rahasya Police 333	Telugu	C. V. Rajendran		
1970	Evari Papayi	Telugu	Krishnan-Panju	Sri Muthukumaran Pictures	M. S. Viswanathan
1971	Manasichi Chudu	Telugu	A. C. Tirulokchandar	Sri Vijaya Films	M. S. Viswanathan
1971	Paga	Telugu	K. Vijayan	Ambal Productions	G. Devarajan
1971	Rowdy Rangadu	Telugu	K. V. Nandana Rao		
1971	Sri Krishna Leela	Telugu	Homi Wadia	Basant Pictures	S. N. Tripathi
1971	Sri Maha Vishnu Mahima	Telugu	A. P. Nagarajan	Thiruvenkateswara Movies	K. V. Mahadevan
1972	Sri Kanyaka Parameshwari Katha	Telugu	Hunsur Krishnamurthy	Evergreen Productions	Rajan–Nagendra
1973	Dasara Pichchodu	Telugu	Y. R. Swamy	Kanteerava Studio	
1974	Peddalu Maarali	Telugu	P. Chandrasekhara Reddy	Subhalakshmi Pictures	
1974	Hanuman Vijayam	Telugu	Babubhai Mistry		
1975	Okammayi Katha	Telugu	Kanakamedala	Kishore Pictures	
1977	Aanimuthyalu	Telugu	Vidwan Prasad	Sri Sangameshwara Films	
1977	Atha Poru	Telugu	Kasilingam	Ganesh Prasanna Pictures	
1978	Circus Kiladilu	Telugu	R. S. Jayagopal		
1978	Karunamayudu	Telugu	A. Bhimsingh		Joseph Fernandez
1980	Kala Chedirindi	Telugu			Chittibabu Bandaru & Visna
1982	Punyabhumi Kallu Therichindi	Telugu	Devadas Kanakala	Arunodaya Film International	
1983	Antham Chusina Aadadhi	Telugu	J. Williams	Evershine Productions	Gangai Amaran & K. J. Joy
1983	Doctor Gari Kodalu	Telugu	Muktha Srinivasan	Vidhya Movies	M. S. Viswanathan
1983	Police Police Police	Telugu	Gopikrishnan		M. S. Viswanathan
1983	Vimukthi Kosam	Telugu	Udaya Kumar	Praja Film Productions	
1988	Nee Gundela Savvadilo	Telugu	V. Ashok Kumar		
1988	Sangamlo Chadarangam	Telugu	R. C. Sakthi	Palayee Amman Art Creations	M. S. Viswanathan
1990	Swatantram Maa Janma Hakku	Telugu	Eleti Ramarao		

=== Singer ===
Year	Film	Language	Song	Co-singer	Music
1952	Palletooru	Telugu	Vacchinadoyi Sankranti	Ghantasala, P. Leela & Vakkalanka Sarala	Ghantasala
1955	Sri Jagannatha Mahatyamu	Telugu	Jagannatha Swamy	A. M. Rajah, Mallik, Venkatraju, Krishna Kumar, V. Lakshmi, Padma Priya & Renuka Sr.	Mallik
1957	Bhale Ammayilu	Telugu	Bombayi Guddalu Ravikela Guddalu	P. B. Sreenivas	S. Rajeswara Rao & S. Hanumantha Rao
1959	Nala Damayanthi	Tamil	Thappi Pottu Thappu	K. Rani	B. Gopalam
1959	Veerapandya Katta Brahmana	Telugu	Vijaya Varadaayaka....Prabho Krupaakara	S. Varalakshmi	G. Ramanathan & B. Gopalam
1961	Bikari Ramudu	Telugu	Ee Dinam Naa Manam	S. Janaki	B. Gopalam
1961	Bikari Ramudu	Telugu	Idem Lokam Guru Garu		B. Gopalam
1961	Bikari Ramudu	Telugu	Thambi Thambi Inge Vaa	P. B. Sreenivas	B. Gopalam
1961	Bikari Ramudu	Telugu	Niduramma Niduramma Kadali		B. Gopalam
1961	Nagarjuna	Telugu	Madi Nuhimpaga Ramudela		Rajan–Nagendra
1961	Nagarjuna	Telugu	Maya Janali Ventabadi		Rajan–Nagendra
1961	Nagarjuna	Telugu	Rama Dushtaraksasa Viramuda		Rajan–Nagendra
1962	Parvathi Vijayam	Telugu	Uma Maheshulagadasodhyam		B. Gopalam
1962	Parvathi Vijayam	Telugu	Jaya Jaya Shambo Jaya Mahadeva	A. P. Komala	B. Gopalam
1963	Anuragam	Telugu	Senaga Chelo Nilabadi	K. Jamuna Rani	Pendyala Nageswara Rao
1963	Sri Krishnarjuna Yuddhamu	Telugu	Anchelanchalu Leni Mokshamu	Swarnalatha	Pendyala Nageswara Rao
1964	Dongalu Doralu	Telugu	Nīve Naakila Todu Mari	M. Raju	J. Purushottam
1965	Akasha Ramanna	Telugu	Thene Poosina Kathi		S. P. Kodandapani
1965	Akasha Ramanna	Telugu	Thaluku Belukulu Chupinchi		S. P. Kodandapani
1965	Satya Harishchandra	Kannada	Shraddhadoota Summane		Pendyala Nageswara Rao
1965	Uyyala Jampala	Telugu	Kaaya Andhadu Ori Nayana	K. Jamuna Rani	Pendyala Nageswara Rao
1966	Palnati Yuddham	Telugu	Satavahana		S. Rajeswara Rao
1966	Rangula Ratnam	Telugu	Vennela Reyi Chandamama	S. Janaki	S. Rajeswara Rao & B. Gopalam
1966	Rangula Ratnam	Telugu	Srimanma Nabhishta Lokabandho (Suprabatham)	S. Janaki	S. Rajeswara Rao & B. Gopalam
1966	Vijaya Shankam	Telugu	Pagale Chukkalu Podipista	S. Janaki	B. Gopalam
1968	Asadhyudu	Telugu	Bharathadesam Paradhasya	Vallam Narasimha Rao, Madhavapeddi Satyam & B. Vasantha	T. Chalapathi Rao
1968	Grama Devathalu	Telugu	Dachaku Nijam Ide Samayam	Ghantasala, P. Susheela & L. R. Eswari	Pendyala Nageswara Rao
1968	Muddu Papa	Telugu	Nannu Koodi Aadavaa	T. M. Soundararajan, P. Leela & A. P. Komala	K. V. Mahadevan & Pamarthi
1968	Panthalu Pattimpulu	Telugu	Netidha Okanatidha	P. Susheela	Pendyala Nageswara Rao
1968	Panthalu Pattimpulu	Telugu	Namo Namo Nataraja		Pendyala Nageswara Rao
1968	Panthalu Pattimpulu	Telugu	Ninne Nenu Mechukunna	L. R. Eswari & S. Janaki	Pendyala Nageswara Rao
1968	Panthalu Pattimpulu	Telugu	Paruvapu Sogasari Piliche Pilupe	P. Susheela	Pendyala Nageswara Rao
1971	Andham Kosam Pandem	Telugu	Aata Janikanchi Bhoomi		S. P. Kodandapani
1971	Andham Kosam Pandem	Telugu	Nintiki Intiki Viluva	S. P. Balasubrahmanyam	S. P. Kodandapani
1976	Kolleti Kapuram	Telugu	Amba Paraku Devi Paraku	C. Vijayalakshmi & S. K. Ravi	Pendyala Nageswara Rao
1976	Kolleti Kapuram	Telugu	Idhenandi Idhenandi Bhagyanagaram	S. Janaki	Pendyala Nageswara Rao
