= Nandi Awards of 1969 =

Indian Telugu film and TV awards ceremony

The Nandi Awards were presented annually by the Government of Andhra Pradesh to recognise excellence in Telugu cinema. The first awards were given in 1964. The following won the best film awards in 1969.

== 1969 Nandi Awards Winners List ==
Category	Winner	Film
Best Feature Film	k.hemambaradhara rao	Kathanayakudu
Second Best Feature Film	V. Madhusudhana Rao	Aatmiyulu
Third Best Feature Film	B. N. Reddy	Bangaru Panjaram
