= Rajen =

Rajen is a name.

== People with the given name ==
- Rajen Borthakur
- Rajen Gohain
- Rajen A. Kilachand
- Rajen Narsinghen
- Rajen Prasad
- Rajen Ruparell
- Rajen Sanyal
- Rajen Sharma
- Rajen Sheth
- Rajen Tarafdar

== People with the surname ==
- M. T. Rajen
- Sorokhaibam Rajen

== See also ==
- Rajendra
