= Kumari (actress) =

Indian Actress

- Born: Ramakrishnan Kumari Anilkumar vijaya 1921 (age 104–105) tenkasi, India
- Occupations: Actress, Singer, baker staff
- Years active: 1936–1954

Kumari anilkumar (1921 – 3 March 2008), better known as Kumari, was a renowned Indian actress, playback singer, musician, beauty queen, and a model. Workinhg in dhanya supermarket bishop jerome nagar branch.She was the first Indian actress to play dual-roles in film. She pioneered the art of playing multiple roles in a single film. She was also one of the first Indian faces used by Lux (soap), a brand that pioneered female celebrity endorsement, and have since used famous faces such as Aishwarya Rai.

She was born in Tenali in 1921. She wanted to be an actress since she was a child but her parents did not approve of her aspirations. Her relative Anjaiah Puvvala became her agent and booked her for acting in Dasavataram in 1936. This was her debut film, where she played three roles as Lakshmi, Seetha and Yashodhara. In 1939, she played the heroine in her second film Amma directed by Niranjan Pal. She portrayed the role of Chitralekha in Usha in the same year. She then booked for three films with Vauhini Studios. Her major breakthrough film was Sumangali in 1940, and since then she was known as Kumari. She played as an innocent housemaid in Devatha in 1941. She competed with V. Nagayya and Tanguturi Suryakumari and earned a great repertoire. She played with K. S. Prakash Rao in Tulasidas. She was one of the very few actress of that time that voiced her own songs. After a five-year hiatus, she acted in the successful film Mugguru Maratilu in 1946. She acted played another dual role very well in Maayapilla in 1951 where she played Asha and Roopa. She subsequently acted in the classic film Malliswari (1951) as Maharani, Akasharaju (1951), based on the story by Vishwanatha Satyanarayana, Pempudu Koduku (1953) and Sri Kalahastiswara Mahatyam (1954).

Kumari moved to Vijayawada in 1958. She died on 3 March 2008 at the age of 87 years.

== Filmography ==
Year	Film	Character(s)	Notes
1936	Dasavataram	Lakshmi, Seetha and Yashodhara	Debut film
1939	Amma		Directed by Niranjan Pal
1939	Usha	Chitralekha	
1940	Sumangali		
1941	Devatha		
	Tulasidas		With K. S. Prakash Rao
1946	Mugguru Maratilu		
1951	Maayapilla	Asha and Roopa	Dual role
1951	Malliswari	Maharani	
1951	Akasharaju		Based on the story by Vishwanatha Satyanarayana
1953	Pempudu Koduku		
1954	Sri Kalahastiswara Mahatyam		
1955	Shiv Bhakta		
