= Viduthalai (1954 film) =

1954 film by K. Ramnoth

- Theatrical release poster
- Directed by: K. Ramnoth
- Screenplay by: Velavan (dialogues)
- Based on: The First and the Last by John Galsworthy
- Produced by: K. Ramnoth
- Starring: V. Nagayya; Manohar
- Cinematography: Babulnath Walke
- Edited by: Paul G. Yadav
- Music by: Lakshman Raghunath
- Production company: New Era Productions
- Distributed by: Subbu & Co.
- Release date: 12 February 1954
- Running time: 170 minutes
- Country: India
- Language: Tamil

Viduthalai (transl. Liberation) is a 1954 Indian Tamil-language crime drama film directed and produced by K. Ramnoth. It was adapted from the play The First and the Last by John Galsworthy. The film stars V. Nagayya and Manohar. It was released on 12 February 1954 and failed at the box office.

== Plot ==
Periaswamy, a crooked lawyer, tries to get his brother Chellaiah off a murder charge by framing Murugan, a horse carriage driver. Overcome with guilt, Chellaiah donates the money he wins in a lottery to Murugan and confesses to his crime in a letter before committing suicide. Periaswamy burns the letter, believing it will affect his chances of being promoted to judge, but the police arrest him, thinking he has committed both the murders.

== Cast ==
- V. Nagayya as Periaswamy
- Manohar as Chellaiah
- T. V. Kumudhini as Chellaiah's wife
- Peer Mohammed as Murugan
- Nott Annaji Rao as the judge

== Production ==
Viduthalai was adapted from the play The First and the Last by John Galsworthy, and was the inaugural production of New Era Productions. Cinematography was handled by Babulnath Walke, and the editing by Paul G. Yadav. K. Ramnoth directed the film, which was produced by G. Ramakrishnan.

== Soundtrack ==
The music was composed by Lakshman Raghunath.

Song	Singer	Lyrics	Length
Anbodu Inbamagaa	P. B. Srinivas	Subbu Arumugam	02:58
Inithaana Thendral	Soolamangalam Rajalakshmi	Subbu Arumugam	03:58
Iraivaa Iraiva	V. Nagayya	Subbu Arumugam	
Abalai Naan Thayanithiye	N. Lalitha	Velavan	
Paathai Veguthooram Bayanthidalamo	Aayaloor Krishnan, Sathiyavathi	Velavan	
Boologame Pugazhum	T. V. Rathnam	Angamangalam Kuppu	

== Release and reception ==
Viduthalai was released on 12 February 1954, and was distributed by Subbu & Co. The film failed commercially, jeopardising Ramnoth in the process.

== Bibliography ==
- Baskaran, S. Theodore (1996). The Eye of the Serpent: An introduction to Tamil cinema. East West Books. OCLC 243920437.
- Rajadhyaksha, Ashish; Willemen, Paul (1998) [1994]. Encyclopaedia of Indian Cinema. British Film Institute and Oxford University Press. ISBN 0-19-563579-5.
