= Mahatmyam =

Mahatmyam, Mahatyam or Mahatmya (lit. 'greatness' in Sanskrit) may refer to:

- Devi Mahatmyam, a Hindu text describing the glory of the goddess Durga
- Kalahasti Mahatyam, a 1954 Indian Telugu-language film about the Kalahasti legend of Hinduism
- Panduranga Mahatyam, an Indian 1957 Telugu-language film by Kamalakara Kameswara Rao about the Hindu deity Panduranga
- Sri Venkateswara Mahatyam, a 1960 Indian Telugu-language musical film by P. Pullayya about the Hindu deity Venkateswara
