= Mula =

Mula may refer to:

== Places ==
- Mula Township, Sichuan, China
- Mula, Ethiopia, a district
- Mula, Iran, a village in Mazandaran Province
- Mule, Norway (also spelled Mula), a village
- Muľa, a village and municipality in southern Slovakia
- Mula, Spain, a town in the autonomous community of Murcia
- Mula, Aguas Buenas, Puerto Rico, a barrio
- Mula River (India)
- Mula River (Pakistan)
- River Mula (Spain)

== People ==
- Álex Mula (born 1996), Spanish footballer
- Avni Mula (1928–2020), Albanian singer, composer and musician
- Blerim Mula (born 1958), football manager and former player
- Çun Mula (1818–1896), Albanian freedom fighter
- Frank Mula (1950–2021), American television writer
- Inva Mula (born 1963), Albanian opera singer
- Marco Antonio Da Mula (1506–1572), also known as Marcantonio Amulio, Venetian ambassador and Catholic cardinal and bishop
- Mula Mustafa Bašeskija (c. 1731–1809), Bosnian chronicler, diarist, poet, calligrapher and Janissary in the Ottoman Empire
- Mula Gabharu (1486–1532), Indian princess who fought an invasion
- Mula Mukesh Goud (1959–2019), Indian politician
- Mula Ram (fl. 2005–2008), Indian politician

== Music ==
- MULA (2015), a Dominican female band
- "Mula" (song), a song by Big Sean featuring French Montana
- Mula, a drum used in Cuban music

== Other uses ==
- Mula (nakshatra), a lunar mansion in Hindu astrology
- Mula Cycling Team, an Indonesian UCI Continental cycling team
- Multispectral Unit for Land Assessment (MULA), a planned 130-kg Filipino satellite, scheduled for launch in 2025–2026

== See also ==
- Palazzo da Mula, a villa in Venice
- Mula-deva, a character in the 11th-century Indian story collection Shringara-manjari-katha
- Mulla (disambiguation)
- Moola (disambiguation)
- Mullah, a title for an Islamic scholar
- Mulah, an island in the Maldives
