= Mulla =

Mulla may refer to:

== Places ==
- River Awbeg, in Ireland
- Mulla, Afghanistan
- Mollakənd, Kurdamir, Azerbaijan

== Other uses ==
- Mullah, a title for an Islamic cleric
- Mulla (surname), including a list of people with the name
- Mulla (film), a 2008 Malayalam film
- Camp Mulla, a Kenyan hip hop group

== See also ==
- Moola (disambiguation)
- Mula (disambiguation)
- Mulah, an island in the Maldives
