= Bhagyalakshmi (disambiguation) =

Bhagyalakshmi (born 1961) is an Indian actress, activist, and dubbing artist.

Bhagyalakshmi may also refer to:

- Bhagyalakshmi (actress) (born 1972), Indian actress
- Bhagyalakshmi (1943 film), an Indian Telugu-language drama film
- Bhagyalakshmi (1961 film), an Indian Tamil-language film
- Bhagyalakshmi (2015 TV series), an Indian Hindi-language soap opera
- Bhagyalakshmi (2022 TV series), an Indian Kannada-language television drama series
