= K. Ramnoth =

Indian cinematographer

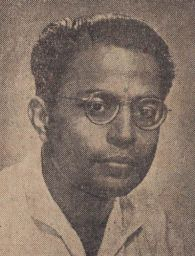
- Born: 1912; Trivandrum
- Died: 1956 (aged 43–44); Chennai
- Occupations: Director, cinematographer

K. Ramnoth (1912–1956) was an Indian cinematographer and director active in Tamil cinema.

== Career ==
Ramnoth was born in 1912 at Pujapura, Trivandrum. After passing his Bachelor degree, he arrived in Chennai in search of a career. He started as an assistant in Kodak. While he was working there, he wrote articles on the subject of photography for various publications. He sent one such article to a publication called Sound and Shadow. This publication was owned jointly by Muthuswami Iyer and A. K. Sekhar (Muthuswami Iyer later directed films under his pen name Murugadasa and A. K. Sekhar became an art director.) The article led Ramnoth to join these two.

A breakthrough came in 1933 when the trio received a letter from V. Shantaram, partner of Prabath Films in Kolapur. Shantaram requested their help in his production of Sita Kalyanam in Tamil. Ramnoth worked as cinematographer and assistant director. His name was shown as K. Ramanathan in the film credits.

The trio then went in charge of the technical department of Vel Studios that was located at Eldams Road in Teynampet. (Later this studio was moved to Guindy). They produced films like Markandeya in 1935 and Pathuga Pattabishekam in 1936.

In one of the films he worked for in 1938, Ramnoth introduced miniature photography for the first time in Tamil films. It was a scene showing a downpour of paddy showering on a parched, famine-stricken land. Viewers were awed to see such a scene.

Due to World War II, some studios had to close down. Ramnoth and A. K. Sekhar went to work for Gemini Studios. They worked in films like Kannamma En Kadhali, Miss Malini and Chandralekha. Both left Gemini some time in 1948–49 and joined Jupiter Pictures who had their office in Central Studios Coimbatore.

While at Jupiters, Ramnoth directed Marmayogi which was a success and brought fame to its lead actor M. G. Ramachandran. It was the first Tamil film to be given an 'A' certificate (adults only) by the CBFC because there was a ghost in the film.

Jupiter was making another film Mohini with Lanka Satyam as its director. A scene had to be shot in which the main actor and actress are seated on a flying horse singing a duet. The producer was not satisfied with the shot. He called Ramnoth to redo the scene, and was impressed with Ramnoth's photography. However, Ramnoth asked the producer to give credit only to Lanka Satyam in the film.

After Jupiter, Ramnoth worked for Pakshiraja Studios and then for Modern Theatres.

Later, in 1954, Ramnoth produced his own film Viduthalai. He suffered financially and mentally due to its failure which led to his death in 1956 at the age of 44.

== Filmography ==
=== As director ===
Year	Film	Language	Notes
1935	Markandeya	Tamil	co-director Murugadasa
1936	Pathuga Pattabishekam	Tamil	co-director Murugadasa
1949	Kanniyin Kathali	Tamil	
1950	Ezhai Padum Padu	Tamil	
1950	Beedala Patlu	Telugu	
1951	Marmayogi	Tamil	
1951	Ek Tha Raja	Hindi	
1952	Thai Ullam	Tamil	
1953	Manithan	Tamil	
1954	Sugam Enge	Tamil	
1954	Rihaee	Hindi	
1954	Viduthalai	Tamil	
1955	Kathanayaki	Tamil	

=== As cinematographer only ===
Year	Film	Language	Notes
1934	Sita Kalyanam	Telugu	
1936	Sasirekha Parinayam	Telugu	
1938	Gruhalakshmi	Telugu	
1939	Vande Mataram	Telugu	
1940	Sumangali	Telugu	
1941	Devata	Telugu	
1943	Bhakta Potana	Telugu	
1943	Mangamma Sabatham	Tamil	
1948	Chandralekha	Tamil	with Kamal Ghosh
1948	Chandralekha	Hindi	with Kamal Ghosh
1948	Kalpana	Hindi	
