= Moola Narayana Swamy =

Indian actor

- Born: c. 1912; Tadpatri, Madras Presidency, India
- Died: 20 August 1950 (aged 38); Tadpatri, Madras Presidency, India
- Occupations: Film Producer, Industrialist

Moola Narayana Swamy (c. 1912 – 20 August 1950) was an Indian businessman and film producer known for his works in Telugu cinema. He owned several businesses such as Rayalaseema Bank, Rayalaseema Textiles, Cuddapah Ceramics, Cuddapah Electric Company, oil mills, milk co-operative societies, arrack contracting, and market yards. He was also known by the moniker Andhra Birla.

He founded Vauhini Studios, which was one of the largest film studios in Asia at the time. In later years, Nagi Reddi acquired Vauhini Studios and renamed it as Vijaya Vauhini Studios.

== Life ==
Moola Narayana Swamy's native place was Tadipatri in Anantapur district of present-day Andhra Pradesh. Narayana Swamy's father, an industrialist, died at a very young age. After the death of his father, Narayana Swamy took over the business inherited from his father, at a very tender age. He expanded the existing business into several businesses such as Rayalaseema Bank, Rayalaseema Textiles, Cuddapah Ceramics, Cuddapah Electric Company, oil mills, milk co-operative societies, arrack contracting, market yards. He also owned the movie theatres Vauhini Talkies in Tadipatri and Raghuveera Talkies in Anantapur.

Narayana Swamy met Bommireddi Narasimha Reddy (father of B. N. Reddy and B. Nagi Reddy) through business connections. Both of them became business partners and started exporting onions to Rangoon in Burma. Narayana Swamy and B. N. Reddy joined as partners in Rohini Pictures owned by H. M. Reddy. Under the Rohini Pictures banner they produced some films like Gruhalakshmi (1938). Later, H. M. Reddy and B. N. Reddy had differences and B. N. Reddy and Narayana Swamy separated and decided to start their own production company. With Narayana Swamy as a major shareholder, Vauhini Pictures was started. Several movies were produced under this banner like Vandemataram (1939), Sumangali (1940), Devatha (1941) and Swarga Seema (1945). Swarga Seema was shot mainly in Newtone Studio in Madras, but, there were so many difficulties with the studio and younger B. N. Reddy who was also director for the movie was very upset and expressed this to Narayana Swamy, hence, Narayana Swamy suggested that they build a new studio.

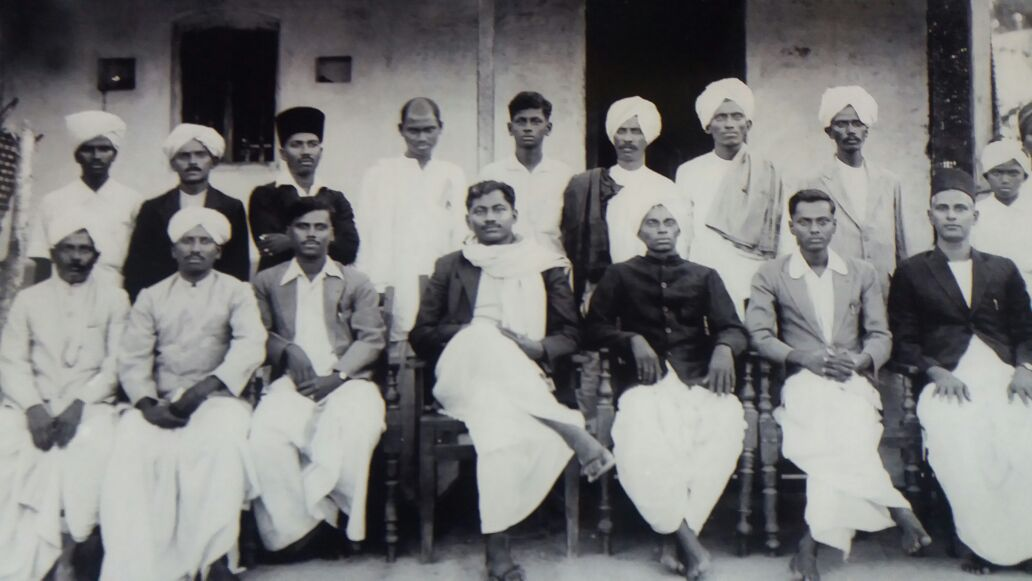
Moola Narayana Swamy at his Oil Mill

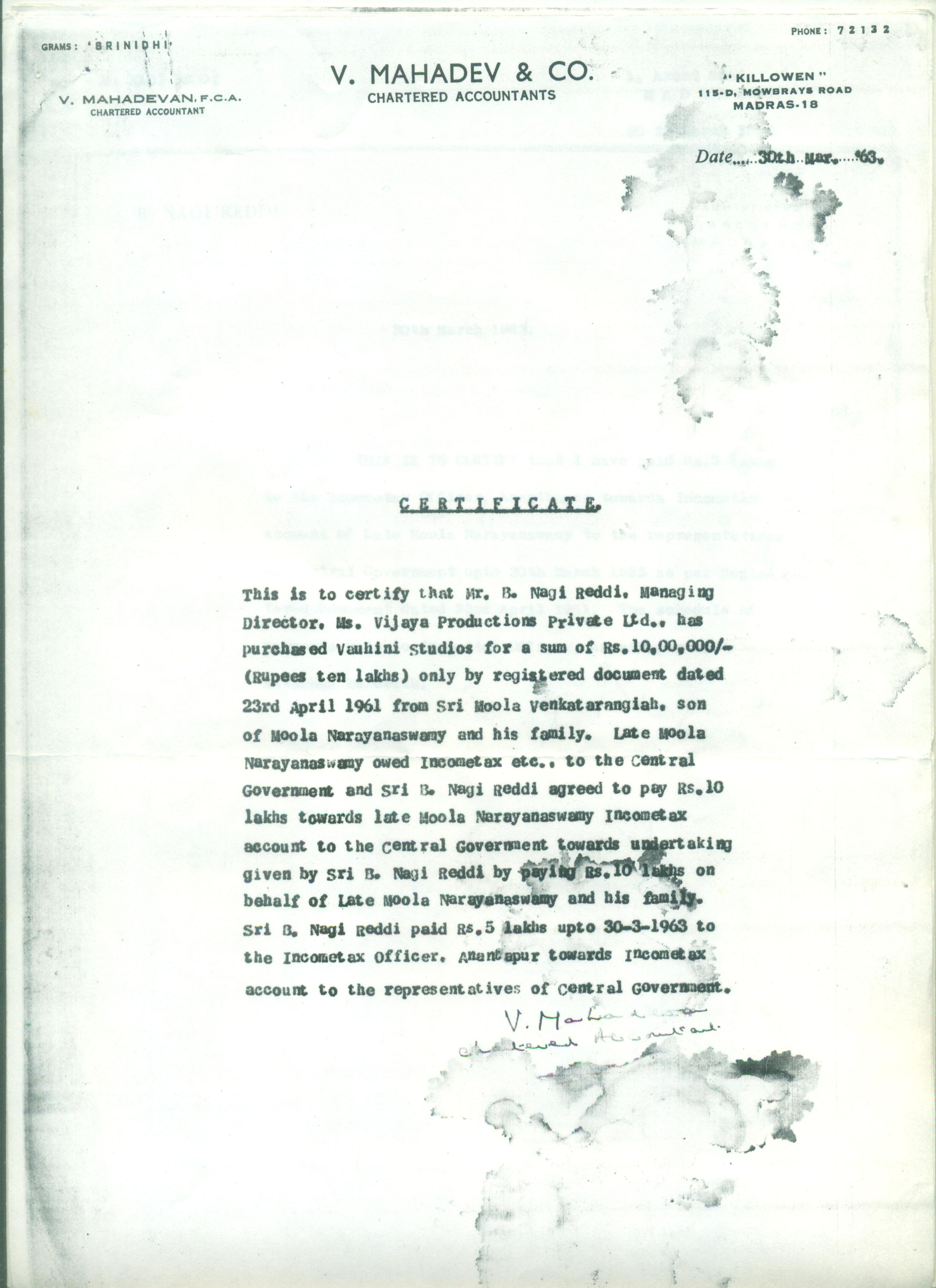
Sale of Vauhini studios by Moola V. Rangaiah to Nagi Reddy

Vauhini Studios was started under the chairmanship of Narayana Swamy. Narayana Swamy was the major share holder. Out of two and half lakh rupees investment, Narayana Swamy's share was two lakhs and rest were B. N. Reddy, Nagi Reddy and others. As part of inheritance from their father Narasimha Reddy, B.N. Reddy and Nagi Reddy got these shares.

In 1948, Narayana Swamy's properties and businesses were seized due to income tax problems. Vauhini studio was hence leased, to Vijaya Productions, to save it from income tax dept. attachment.

Narayana Swamy died in 1950. He was 38 years old at the time of his death. He was survived by all his sons who were minors. Even his eldest son, Moola Venkata Rangaiah, was 11 years old. As of a result of this, his family eventually spiralled into deep financial trouble.

In 1961, Narayana Swamy's son became a major. His eldest son with the help of Damodaram Sanjivayya (whom Narayana Swamy helped for his education) sold the studio to B. Nagi Reddy as part of an agreement that they'll clear all the income tax dues that need to be paid by Narayana Swamy family. B.Nagi Reddy later renamed the studio to Vijaya Vauhini Studios.

== Personal life ==
Narayana Swamy had four sons and four daughters. His eldest son Moola Venkata Rangaiah was also Municipal Chairman for Tadipatri for one term.

Narayana Swamy got his childhood friend, Kadiri Venakata Reddy, a cashier job in Vahuini Pictures and later made him direct the film Bhakta Potana (1943). Bhakta Potana was a very big hit, thus, K.V. Reddy's reputation was established and he went to direct many other movies for Vauhini and Vijaya studios.

Narayana Swamy donated ₹1 lakh to Kasturba Fund. He also helped fund the education of many children. Damodaram Sanjivayya, who later became the Chief Minister of Andhra Pradesh was one among them.

Narayana Swamy's cousins Moola Rangappa and M. K. Swamy, part shareholders in Deccan Herald newspaper, were also into arrack and excise business and focused in Bangalore, Bellary and Davanagere area. Moola Rangappa's son Moola Bhaktavatsala also produced some Kannada films.

== Death ==
Narayana Swamy died in 1950 at the age of 38 in Madanapalle. His eldest son Moola Venkata Rangaiah was the co-owner of the studios.

== Selected filmography ==
Producer

- Vande Mataram (1939)
- Gruhalakshmi (1938)
- Sumangali (1940)
- Devatha (1941)
- Bhakta Potana (1942)
- Pedda Manushulu
- Vaddante Dabbu (1944)
- Swargaseema (1945)
- Yogi Vemana (1947)
- Guna Sundari Katha (1949)
