= Rangula Ratnam (1966 film) =

- Theatrical release poster
- Directed by: B. N. Reddy
- Written by: Palagummi Padmaraju; D.V. Narasa Raju
- Produced by: B. N. Reddy
- Starring: Chandra Mohan; Ram Mohan Rao; Vanisri; Anjali Devi; Rekha (Child Artist)
- Cinematography: U. Rajagopal
- Edited by: M. S. Mani; K. Satyam
- Music by: S. Rajeswara Rao; B. Gopalam
- Release date: 1966
- Running time: 160 minutes
- Country: India
- Language: Telugu

Rangula Ratnam is a 1966 Indian Telugu-language film directed and produced by B. N. Reddy under the banner of Vauhini pictures. The film stars Chandra Mohan, Vanisri, Anjali Devi and Baby Rekha (in her on-screen debut). It is a social and political satire involving a middle-class family in the backdrop of politics and elections. The film won the National Film Award for Best Feature Film in Telugu and also won two Nandi Awards. B. N. Reddy introduced many stalwarts like Chandra Mohan, Vanisri, Rekha and Vijaya Nirmala as young artistes to the film industry with this movie.

== Plot ==
Though his forefathers were landlords, Sundara Ramayya has fallen on hard times. He sells the last three acres of land he owns, moves with his family to a nearby town in search of livelihood. He starts a small business which eventually fails as cannot collect dues from his customers. His ambition is to make his elder son Surya Chandra Rao an advocate. He worries about his second son Vasu who is not good at studies. Vasu practices wrestling in the surrounding Sankara Rao Vyamasala and Sankara Rao encourages Vasu. Sundara Ramayya dies and his wife Sita takes care of the family. Suryam does not understand the financial problems of the family whereas Vasu comes to the rescue of his mother and takes care of her sister. Suryam finds an easy way to get rich and marries the daughter of a rich politician and abandons his family. Vasu believes in the common good for society. He falls in love with Sankara Rao's daughter, who is from another class in society.

Eventually, both brothers find themselves on the opposite sides while competing in the elections. During this struggle, family differences increase and their mother gets injured. The movie ends with the two brothers reconciling their differences.

== Cast ==
- Anjali Devi - mother Seetha
- Chandra Mohan - younger brother Vasu
- Ram Mohan - elder brother Surya Chandra Rao
- Vanisri - wife of Vasu, jimmi
- Sukanya - wife of Suryam, Vanaja
- Vijaya Nirmala - sister Jaya
- Ramana Reddy - municipal chairman Appalasamy
- Pushpavalli - wife of Appalasamy
- Thyagaraju
- Baby Bhanurekha (Rekha) - Tyagaraju's daughter
- Vijayasree

== Soundtrack ==
Many of the songs were successful melodies. They were in four classes, devotional used as prayers in a middle-class family, sad songs amid hardships, romantic songs, and patriotic and social songs in the elections background.

All music is composed by Saluri Rajaswara Rao and B. Gopalam.

No.	Title	Lyrics	Singer(s)	Length
1.	"Chepa Rupamuna ... Kurma Rupuvai ... PannagaSayana" (dasavarathams of Lord Vishnu)	Daasarathi	A. P. Komala and M.L. Vasantha Kumari.	2:45
2.	"Nadireyi Eee jamulo" (prayer to Balaji, Tirumala)	Daasarathi	Ghantasala and S. Janaki	3:44
3.	"Kanarani Devude Kanipinchinade"	Daasarathi	P. Susheela	3:39
4.	"Vandemataram" (popular Indian patriotic song)	Bankim Chandra Chattopadhyay	Ghantasala	1:28
5.	"Desa Bhaktulam Memandi" (satire on politicians and elections)	Kosaraju	Madhavapeddi Satyam and Pithapuram Nageswara Rao	8:59
6.	"Suprabhatam"			0:48
7.	"Intera Eee Jeevitam Tirige Rangula Ratnam" (main theme song of the movie)	BhujangaRaya Sharma	Ghantasala	3:49
8.	"Manusu Manasu Kalise Vela Kanuula Dagina Anuragam"	C. Narayana Reddy	P. B. Srinivas and P. Susheela	3:32
9.	"Koyila Koyani Pilichinadhi"		P. Susheela	3:31
10.	"Vennela Reyi Chandamama"	Kosaraju	B. Gopalam and S. Janaki	4:17

== Accolades ==
Nandi Awards - 1966

- Best Feature Film - Gold - B. N. Reddy
- Best Story Writer - Palagummi Padmaraju
