= Devata (1941 film) =

- Poster
- Directed by: B. N. Reddy
- Screenplay by: Samudrala Sr.
- Story by: K. Ramnoth
- Produced by: Moola Narayana Swamy; B. N. Reddy
- Starring: V. Nagayya; Kumari; Mudigonda Lingamurthy; C. H. Narayana Rao; Tanguturi Suryakumari
- Cinematography: K. Ramnoth
- Music by: V. Nagayya
- Production company: Vauhini Studios
- Release date: 4 July 1941
- Running time: 186 minutes
- Country: India
- Language: Telugu

Devata is a 1941 Indian Telugu-language drama film directed by B. N. Reddy. The huge success of this film led to the making of more films with the same title in 1964 by B. Padmanabham and in 1982 by D. Ramanaidu. The film was remade in Malayalam as Pavappettaval (1967).

== Plot ==
The film follows Venugopala Murthy "Venu" (Nagayya), who returns to his village after completing his studies in England to become a barrister. His mother Mangamma (Parvathi Bai) and sister Sita (Tanguturi Suryakumari) are overjoyed by his return. Lakshmi (Kumari), a poor servant girl living with them, wins everyone's affection, and her brother Rangadu (Aswatthama) also works in the household.

Venu’s wealthy uncle Balaramayya (Subba Rao), a prominent zamindar in Madras, wishes to marry his daughter Vimala (Bejawada Rajaratnam) to Venu. Vimala, a poetry and music enthusiast, becomes entangled with Sukumar (C.H. Narayana Rao), a manipulative man trying to gain her father's favour.

In a turn of events, Venu succumbs to desire and assaults Lakshmi, promising marriage but later abandoning her. Venu moves to Madras to practice law, where his uncle invites his mother and sister to discuss his marriage. Lakshmi, pregnant with Venu's child, also arrives in Madras, but Venu offers her money to leave. Heartbroken, Lakshmi and her brother return to their village but face societal rejection. Fearing backlash, Lakshmi leaves her home.

While Venu grapples with guilt, Vimala elopes with Sukumar. Meanwhile, Lakshmi finds refuge with a kind Haridasu (R. Satyanarayana), but local villagers accuse him of harbouring an outcast, forcing Lakshmi to leave again. She eventually ends up in a brothel run by Tripuramba (Seshamamba) in Madras. When her child falls ill, Lakshmi seeks help from Tripuramba but later attacks her in desperation to escape. Arrested by the police, Lakshmi is exonerated when Tripuramba testifies to her innocence and character.

In the end, Venu repents and accepts Lakshmi as his wife, reuniting their family. The film explores themes of societal norms, repentance, and redemption, portraying the struggles of marginalized individuals and the consequences of moral failings.

== Cast ==
- V. Nagayya as Venugopala Murthy
- Kumari as Lakshmi, daughter of Venkayya
- Mudigonda Lingamurthy as Venkaiah
- Bezawada Rajarathnam as Vimala, daughter of Balaramayya
- Goberu Subba Rao as Balaramayya, uncle of Venu
- C. H. Narayana Rao as Sukumar
- Tanguturi Suryakumari as Seeta, sister of Venu
- Master Aswathama as Rangadu
- Parvathi Bai as Mangamma, mother of Venu
- R. Satyanarayana

== Music ==
The lyrics for the songs are written by Samudrala Sr. and music score is provided by V. Nagayya.

1. "Adigo Andiyala Ravali" – Bezawada Rajaratnam
2. "Bhajane Modajanakamura" – G. Vishweswaramma and Suryakumari
3. "Ee Vasanthamu Nityamu Kadoyi" – M. S. Rama Rao
4. "Enno Nomulu Nochinagani" – G. Vishweswaramma
5. "Evaru Makinka Saati" – Bezawada Rajaratnam
6. "Jagela Verapela Travumu" – Bezawada Rajaratnam
7. "Kroora Karmamulu Neraka Chesiti" – G. Vishweswaramma and Suryakumari
8. "Lokamantha Lobhule Kanare" – Ashwathama
9. "Nijamo Kado Yamuna Thatilo" – Bezawada Rajaratnam
10. "Oogeda Uyyala" – Tanguturi Suryakumari
11. "Rade Cheli Nammarade Cheli" – Bezawada Rajaratnam
12. "Raitu Janamula Panduga" – Tanguturi Suryakumari group
13. "Rave Rave Bangaru Papa" – Nagayya, Kumari, Suryakumari
14. "Vendi Kanchalalo" – Tanguturi Suryakumari
15. "Ananadham ananandham vere kalade"-Nagayya, Kumari, Tanguturi suryakumari
16. "Ennallundedavu iha sukhamulalo"-Nagayya

Ananda Vikatan wrote, "Oh gods and goddesses! We wanted to portray you as heroes and heroines in our films. That's what we said when we produced talkies. No god/goddess objected to that. [T]hen we came down to Puranic characters – on to bhaktas, maharajahs, zamindars, millionaires and thence to the common man. But none had thought to make the servant maid the heroine of a film". B. Vijayakumar of The Hindu wrote, "Even if the story is simple and artistic, technical brilliance can bring unusual success for a film. B. N. Reddy’s black and white classic Telugu film Devata is a best example for this."

== Bibliography ==
- Rajadhyaksha, Ashish; Willemen, Paul (1998) [1994]. Encyclopaedia of Indian Cinema. British Film Institute and Oxford University Press. ISBN 0-19-563579-5.
