= 21 Days =

1940 British drama film directed by Basil Dean

- Theatrical release poster
- Directed by: Basil Dean
- Written by: Graham Greene; Basil Dean
- Based on: The First and the Last; 1920 short story & play by John Galsworthy
- Produced by: Alexander Korda
- Starring: Vivien Leigh; Laurence Olivier; Leslie Banks
- Cinematography: Jan Stallich
- Edited by: Charles Crichton; William Hornbeck
- Music by: Muir Mathieson; John Greenwood
- Production company: London Film Productions, Ltd.
- Distributed by: Columbia Pictures
- Release dates: 7 January 1940; 22 May 1940 (New York)
- Running time: 72 minutes
- Country: United Kingdom
- Language: English

21 Days (also known as 21 Days Together, The First and the Last and Three Weeks Together) is a 1940 British drama film based on the short 1919 play The First and the Last by John Galsworthy. It was directed by Basil Dean and stars Vivien Leigh, Laurence Olivier and Leslie Banks. The film was renamed 21 Days Together for the American market.

== Plot ==
Larry Darrant, the black sheep of his family, returns home to London from an unsuccessful business venture in Rhodesia and embarks on an affair with a married woman, Wanda. When Wanda's long-absent Russian husband Henry appears, he tries to extort money from the couple and threatens Larry at knifepoint when he refuses to pay. In the ensuing fight, Henry is accidentally killed when he strikes his head.

Larry places Henry's body in a quiet brick archway. He then visits his brother Keith, a successful barrister hoping to soon become a judge, for advice. Keith tells Larry to leave the country for a while to avoid capture. Keith's motivation is partly to avoid the damage that Larry's arrest would do to his own career.

However, Larry refuses to leave and returns to the alley where he had left the body. There he encounters John Evan, a former minister turned tramp, who collects a pair of bloody gloves that Larry has dropped in the street. When Evan is found with the gloves, he is arrested for Wallen's murder, and the police believe that they have sufficient evidence for a conviction. Evan is so remorseful for robbing the dead body of a ring that he insists on his guilt.

When Larry learns of Evan's arrest, he considers himself a temporarily free man and decides to marry Wanda. Larry and Wanda try to compress 30 years of idyllic life into the course of just 21 days, as Larry plans to turn himself in to the police before Evan's trial begins. On the day when Evan is sentenced to hang, Keith begs his brother to remain silent and let the condemned man die. Larry, set on doing the right thing, refuses and leaves for the police station. He is stopped on the steps of the station by Wanda, chasing after him, who has learned that Evan died from a heart attack on his way to jail.

== Cast ==
- Vivien Leigh as Wanda Wallen
- Laurence Olivier as Larry Darrant
- Leslie Banks as Keith Darrant
- Francis L. Sullivan as Mander
- David Horne as Beavis
- Hay Petrie as John Aloysius Evan
- William Dewhurst as the Lord Chief Justice
- Esmé Percy as Henry Wallen
- Frederick Lloyd as Swinton
- Robert Newton as Tolly
- Victor Rietti as Antonio
- Morris Harvey as Pawnbroker Alexander MacPherson
- Elliott Mason as Frau Grunlich
- Arthur Young as Ascher
- Meinhart Maur as Carl Grunlich
- Andreas Malandrinos as Cafe Tyrol Waiter (uncredited)

== Production ==
Producer Alexander Korda intended 21 Days as a star vehicle for Vivien Leigh, but his constant interference caused great problems on the set. He rearranged shooting schedules and added a sequence, and director Basil Dean reportedly never viewed a rough cut or the finished product. The title change to 21 Days was attributed to Korda. His younger brother Vincent Korda was the film's art director and was responsible for the set design. Principal photography took place in 1937 at Denham Film Studios.

Following Leigh's star turn with her performance as Scarlett O'Hara in Gone with the Wind (1939), Korda shelved 21 Days for two years before releasing it to Columbia Pictures.

== Reception ==
In a contemporary review for The New York Times, critic Bosley Crowther wrote: "True, it is no deathless drama—is little more than a cultivated penny-thriller, in fact—and Miss Leigh, as the party of the second part, is required to devote her charm and talents to nothing more constructive than making the apparently inevitable parting from poor Mr. Olivier seem exceedingly painful, indeed. But it is a highly charged 'meller,' rigid throughout with suspense and nicely laced with much tender emotion."
