= Bangaru Panjaram =

- Theatrical release poster
- Directed by: B. N. Reddy
- Written by: Palagummi Padmaraju
- Screenplay by: B. N. Reddy
- Story by: Palagummi Padmaraju
- Produced by: B. N. Reddy
- Starring: Shobhan Babu; Sriranjani; Vanisri
- Narrated by: N. T. Rama Rao
- Cinematography: B. N. Konda Reddy; C. A. S. Mani; Madhav Bulbule
- Edited by: M. S. Mani
- Music by: S. Rajeswara Rao; B. Gopalam
- Production company: Vauhini Studios
- Distributed by: Vauhini Pictures
- Release date: 19 March 1969
- Running time: 2:34:48
- Country: India
- Language: Telugu

Bangaru Panjaram (transl. Golden Cage) is a 1969 Indian Telugu-language romantic musical film directed by B. N. Reddy, and written by Palagummi Padmaraju. The soundtrack was helmed by S. Rajeswara Rao, with lyrics penned by Devulapalli Krishnasastri. The film is the last directorial of B. N. Reddy. The film received the Filmfare Award for Best Film – Telugu, and was screened at the 4th International Film Festival of India.

== Plot ==
Venu Gopal is an engineer who travels extensively for work. During his travel, he meets a girl, Neela. They fall in love, and get married. But Venu's uncle wants him to marry his daughter. So he makes various plans and creates misunderstanding between Venu and Neela. Finally Neela leaves the house and then Venu discovers the cruelty of his uncle. He falls ill out of guilt. What happens next forms the rest of the story.

== Cast ==
- Sobhan Babu... Venu Gopal
- Vanisree... Neela
- Sriranjani
- Rao Gopal Rao... Doctor
- Baby Rani

== Soundtrack ==
The musical score was composed by S. Rajeswara Rao and B. Gopalam.

Song	Lyrics	Singers
"Gattu Kaada Evaro Chettu Needa Evaro Nallakanula Nagasvaramu Ooderu Evaro"	Devulapalli Krishnasastri	S. Janaki
"Kondala Konala Sooreedu Kurise Bangaru Neeru"	Devulapalli Krishnasastri	S. Janaki
"Jo Kodutu Katha Chebite Oo Kodutu Vintava"	Devulapalli Krishnasastri	S. Janaki
"Manishey Maareraa Raaja Manase Maareraa"	Devulapalli Krishnasastri	S. Janaki
"Nee Padamule Chaalu Raama Nee Pada Dhoolule Padivelu"	Devulapalli Krishnasastri	
"Srisaila Bhavana Bhramaramba Ramana"	Devulapalli Krishnasastri	Ghantasala, S. Janaki
"Pagalaite Doravera Raatiri Naa Raajuvula"	Devulapalli Krishnasastri	S. Janaki

== Awards ==
- Filmfare Best Film Award (Telugu) – B. N. Reddy(1969)
- The film won Nandi Award for Third Best Feature Film – Bronze (1969)
