= Bhagyalakshmi (1943 film) =

1943 Telugu film by P. Pullayya

Bhagya Lakshmi
- Poster
- Directed by: P. Pullayya
- Written by: P. Pullayya (story & screenplay); Samudrala Raghavacharya (dialogues)
- Produced by: Chittoor Nagayya
- Starring: Chittoor Nagayya; Malathi; Doraiswamy; T. Suryakumari; Giri; Vellala Umamaheswara Rao; Kamala Kotnis; N. S. Krishnan; T. A. Madhuram
- Cinematography: M. A. Rehman
- Edited by: T. A. S. Mani
- Music by: Bheemavarapu Narasimha Rao
- Production company: Sri Renuka Films
- Release date: 4 March 1943
- Country: India
- Language: Telugu

Bhagyalakshmi is a 1943 Indian Telugu-language drama film directed by P. Pullayya and produced by Chittoor Nagayya. The film features Nagayya, Malathi, Doraswamy, Tanguturi Suryakumari, and Giri in key roles. It is notable for being Nagayya’s first production under the Renuka Films banner. Bhagyalakshmi was recognized as the 100th talkie film in Telugu cinema, as noted in a souvenir published by the Film Federation of India to commemorate the silver jubilee of Indian talkies. It did not perform well at the box office.

== Plot ==
Dharamanna, a kind-hearted man in Tirupati, finds an abandoned baby boy and raises him as his own, naming him Srinivasa Rao. Srinivasa Rao grows up to be a well-educated schoolteacher and gains proficiency in music. The villagers admire him deeply. Rangamma, Dharamanna’s distant relative, lives next door with her son Gopi and daughter Bhagya Lakshmi. Gopi and Srinivasa Rao become close friends, while Bhagya Lakshmi, who was raised in Dharamanna's home, shares a special bond with Srinivasa Rao. Despite their close relationship, neither realizes the depth of their feelings for each other.

As Bhagya Lakshmi matures, she continues to participate in school plays and wins several accolades. However, her maternal uncle, Kotayya, disapproves of her public appearances and demands that she marry soon. Gopi suggests that she marry Srinivasa Rao, but Kotayya opposes that, citing Srinivasa Rao's unknown lineage. Ultimately, Kotayya arranges her marriage to Janakiramaiah's son, Viswanatha Rao, despite Bhagya Lakshmi's feelings for Srinivasa Rao.

Heartbroken, Srinivasa Rao flees in despair on the night of Bhagya Lakshmi's wedding. The next day, Dharamanna searches for Srinivasa Rao but to no avail.

Bhagya Lakshmi marries Viswanatha Rao and bears him a son. Meanwhile, Srinivasa Rao suffers from intense emotional turmoil, unable to forget Bhagya Lakshmi. A group of travelers finds him and takes him to a remote temple where he recovers. Despite efforts to move on, he returns to Tirupati. Dharamanna finds him and brings him home.

Rumors spread about Srinivasa Rao and Bhagya Lakshmi’s past, instigated by Kamakshi, a teacher who once had feelings for Srinivasa Rao. Viswanatha Rao grows suspicious of his wife and throws her out of their home. Eventually, Srinivasa Rao clears the misunderstandings, restoring peace between the couple. The film concludes with Srinivasa Rao’s inner turmoil coming to an end as the truth about his intentions is revealed.

== Cast ==
- Chittoor Nagayya as Srinivasa Rao
- Malathi as Bhagya Lakshmi
- Doraiswamy
- Tanguturi Suryakumari
- Giri as Viswanatha Rao
- Vellala Umamaheswara Rao
- Kamala Kotnis
- N. S. Krishnan
- T. A. Madhuram
- Gouripati Sastri
- Parvati Bai

== Production ==
Nagayya engaged P. Pullayya to direct his first independent production, aimed at revitalizing the star's heroic screen image following his roles in second leads and saint films at Vauhini Studios. When filming was halted in Madras during the war, Nagayya relocated his 60-member unit to Tirupati, where some scenes were shot. A comedy track featuring the popular Tamil duo N. S. Krishnan and T. A. Madhuram was included, and they were portrayed as a Telugu-speaking Tamil couple linked to the main storyline through a devotional song performed by Nagayya.

== Music ==
The soundtrack, composed by Bheemavarapu Narasimha Rao, featured lyrics by Samudrala Raghavacharya. Notable songs include "Sri Ramani Manoramana," sung by Nagayya, Giri, and Malathi, and various solos by Malathi and Suryakumari. The soundtrack features a mix of emotional melodies and peppy numbers.

The film featured the classic hit song "Aasa Nirasa," performed by playback singer R. Balasaraswathi Devi. According to film historian V. A. K. Ranga Rao, this marked a significant milestone in Telugu cinema, as it was the first instance where a playback singer received explicit credit for their work on songs featuring Kamala Kotnis, highlighting the distinction between the singing voices and the actors on screen.

== Reception ==
Despite the presence of popular actors and a melodious score, Bhagyalakshmi did not perform well at the box office. Nevertheless, its significance in Indian cinema history is marked by its status as the 100th talkie in Telugu.
