= Kathanayaki =

- Theatrical release poster
- Directed by: K. Ramnoth
- Written by: T. K. Govindan
- Produced by: T. R. Sundaram
- Starring: Padmini; T. R. Ramachandran; M. N. Rajam; K. A. Thangavelu
- Cinematography: W. R. Subba Rao
- Edited by: L. Balu
- Music by: G. Ramanathan
- Production company: Modern Theatres
- Release date: 19 February 1955
- Country: India
- Language: Tamil

Kathanayaki transl. Heroine) is a 1955 Indian Tamil language romantic comedy film directed by K. Ramnoth and produced by T. R. Sundaram. The film stars Padmini, T. R. Ramachandran, M. N. Rajam and K. A. Thangavelu. It was released on 19 February 1955, and was not a commercial success. The movie was inspired from Hollywood movie Happy Go Lovely which was released in 1951.

== Plot ==
Manjula, a young village girl, aspires to be a stage actress and become popular one day. Manjula parents are against her wishes. The story centers around the struggling Ganapathy Drama Troupe. Driven by her passion for acting, Manjula leaves home with her friend Amudha and joins the drama company where Amudha works.On the other side, P.S. Vadhanam is from a wealthy family and owns P.S. Vadhanam and Company. A true modernist, he spends his time conducting scientific research at home, dreaming of inventions like driverless cars and automated retail shops. While his aunts constantly pressure him to marry their daughters, he shows no interest.Meanwhile, the drama troupe is drowning in debt and constantly raided by debt collectors. Adding to the chaos, Amudha had bought sarees on credit from the owner of Ajantha Silk Palace, who also arrives to collect his dues.As events unfold, Manjula accepts a ride in P.S. Vadhanam's car courtesy of his driver. Members of the drama troupe and the textile shop owner mistake this for a romantic relationship between Manjula and Vadhanam. Hoping to benefit from Vadhanam in the future, the textile shop owner gifts more sarees to Manjula.When Vadhanam receives the unexpected saree bill, he visits the theatre to investigate. Driven by jealousy, a rival actress complains to her brother, a newspaper editor, urging him to write a damaging article about Manjula and Vadhanam. To investigate the story, the editor also visits the theatre troupe. Amidst the ensuing confusion, Manjula mistakes Vadhanam for a journalist.In the events that follow, the wealthy man falls in love with her. She faces numerous problems, and the rest of the plot explores how she and her boyfriend solve them.

== Cast ==
- Padmini as Manjula
- T. R. Ramachandran as P.S.Vadhanam
- M. N. Rajam as Amudha
- K. A. Thangavelu as M.D. Panchanatham (Drama troupe Manager)
- A. Karunanidhi as Ubayogam (Drama troupe Asst.Manager)
- K. Malathi as Indra Rani
- T. K. Ramachandran as Thagidathathom (NewsPaper Editor)
- K. S. Angamuthu as P.S.Vadhanam aunt
- P. S. Gnanam as P.S.Vadhanam aunt
- P. D. Sambandam as P.S.Vadhanam & company manager
- K. R. Jayagowri
- M. R. Santhanam as Manjula Father
- K. K. Soundar as Stage actor
- V. P. S. Mani as Astrologer
- T. K. Kalyanam
- Jayasakthivel
- S. Ramarao as Ajantha Silk Palace owner
- M. R. Sundaram
- R. M. Sethupathi
- Rajasekharan
- Raju
- Nagaratnam

== Soundtrack ==
Music was scored by G. Ramanathan while the lyrics were penned by Suratha, Kannadasan and Thanjai N. Ramaiah Dass.

Song	Singer/s	Lyricist	Length
"Kodi Naatuven, Vetri Kodi Naatuven"	P. Leela		04:57
"Adhirshtam Adhu Ishtamaaga Varuvadhu"	P. Leela		03:09
"Ammammaa Aagaadhu Aavesam Koodadhu"	S. C. Krishnan & K. Rani		03:12
"Pasi Pasi Pasi Parama Ezhaigalin"	S. C. Krishnan & K. Rani		03:22
"Idli Saambaar, Namma Idli Saambaar"	S. C. Krishnan		03:06
"Adho Varugiran" (Sathiyavan Natagam)	S. C. Krishnan		04:05
"Maalai Onru Kaiyil" (Kannagi Natagam)	K. Jamuna Rani & Radha Jayalakshmi		12:04
"Perum Panathile Pirandhu"	P. Leela & Swarnalatha		03:35
"Duraiye Ilamai Paaraai"	A. M. Rajah & K. Jamuna Rani		05:48
"Karpanai Kanavinile Naan Oru"	A. M. Rajah & Swarnalatha		03:20
"Alolam Alolam" (Sri Valli Natagam)	S. C. Krishnan & Swarnalatha		02:42

== Release and reception ==
Kathanayaki was released on 19 February 1955. According to historian Randor Guy, the film was not successful as some critics felt it had a "predictable" storyline.
