= Mevlevi (disambiguation) =

The Mevlevi Order is a Sufi order founded by the followers of Rumi below.

Mevlevi may also refer to:

- Mevlevi or Rumi (1207–1273), Persian poet and mystic
- Mevlevi, or Sufi whirling, a ritual associated with the order

== See also ==
- Mawlawi (disambiguation)
