= Bedara Kannappa =

1954 Kannada film by H. L. N. Simha

- Poster
- Directed by: H. L. N. Simha
- Written by: A Kannada folktale
- Produced by: A. V. Meiyappan; C. R. Basavaraju; Gubbi Veeranna
- Starring: Rajkumar; Pandari Bai; Raja Sulochana; Narasimha Raju
- Cinematography: S. Maruthi Rao
- Edited by: K. Shankar
- Music by: R. Sudarsanam; G. Govindarajulu Naidu (additional song in Tamil version)
- Production companies: AVM Productions; The Karnataka Films Ltd.
- Release date: 7 May 1954
- Running time: 165 minutes
- Country: India
- Language: Kannada

Bedara Kannappa is a 1954 Indian Kannada-language Hindu mythological film directed by H. L. N. Simha and written by G. V. Iyer. The film stars Rajkumar in the title character and Pandari Bai, Kushala Kumari, G. V. Iyer, Sandhya and Narasimharaju in other prominent roles. The film is an adaptation of the stage play Kaalahasti Charitre written by T. N. Balakrishna for the Gubbi Veeranna Nataka Company, which was based on the folk tale of the hunter Kannappa who proves his extreme devotion to the Hindu God Shiva by gouging out both his eyes.

Bedara Kannappa started as a play produced by the Gubbi Veeranna Nataka Company before it became a Kannada film. The film rights of the play were later bought by A. V. Meiyappan of AVM Productions. The film's songs were composed by R. Sudarsanam, with lyrics written by S. Nanjappa. The cinematography of the film was handled by S. Maruthi Rao. In 1953, Singanalluru Puttaswamaiah Muthuraj, a dramatist with Gubbi Veeranna Nataka Company was spotted by director H. L. N. Simha, who was on the lookout for well-built, pleasant-faced man for the starring role in film. Simha eventually signed Muthuraj for the film and named him Rajkumar. Filming began in mid-1953 and took over two months to complete. This was the debut film of both Rajkumar and Narasimharaju as actors and of G.V. Iyer as a scriptwriter.

Bedara Kannappa was released on May 7, 1954 in Bangalore's Sagar and Shivaji theatres and New Opera theatre in Mysore to low expectations. The owners of New Opera theatre, thought that at best it would only run for two weeks. However, defying expectations; The film was critically and commercially successful, becoming the first Kannada film to have a direct run of 365 days. The film was the inaugural recipient of National Film Award for Best Feature Film in Kannada (then called the Certificate of Merit) in National film awards 1954. Following the film's success in Karnataka, it was dubbed and released in Tamil as Vedan Kannappa including a song ("Aasaikkoru Aan Pillai") which was deleted in the Kannada version and only had the dance sequence with background music replacing the song. Later, the film was remade in Telugu as Kalahasti Mahatyam also starring Rajkumar. The film was also remade in Hindi in 1955 by the same director-producer duo as Shiv Bhakta. It also inspired the 1976 Telugu movie Bhakta Kannappa.

== Plot ==
Dinna (Rajkumar) and Neela (Pandharibai) are gods banished to earth where they are born to a tribe of hunters. They grow up and become involved with a corrupt temple priest who accuses Dinna of theft. Dinna weathers all the tests, including torture, the gods impose on him.

== Cast ==
Character	Actor
Dinna / Kannappa	Rajkumar
Neela, wife of Dinna	Pandari Bai
Young Dinna	Ratan
Young Neela	Kushala Kumari
Kailasanatha Sastry	G. V. Iyer
Gowri, Wife of Kailasanath	Sandhya
Kasinatha Sastry, son of Kailasanath	Narasimharaju
Lord Shiva	H. R. Shastry
Parvathi	Yellamma Devi
Srihari	Rushyendramani
Chintamani	Rajasulochana
Basavareddy	A. V. Subba Rao
Doddayya	M. R. Dasappa
Gowdaru	T.K. Upendra
	M. R. Nanjappa
	Narayana
	S. R. Raju
Dancer	J. P. Chandrababu

== Soundtrack ==
The film's soundtrack was composed by R. Sudharsanam. The song Shivappa Kayo Tande (literally Shiva, protect me oh father), sung by Chidambaram S. Jayaraman became very popular and is sung even today in orchestras.

=== Kannada tracklist ===
Lyrics were by S. Nanjappa. Playback singers are C. S. Jayaraman, T. A. Mothi, M. L. Vasanthakumari, T. S. Bagavathi & P. Susheela.

Track#	Song	Singer(s)	Lyrics	Length (m:ss)
1	"Shivappa Kaayo Thande"	C. S. Jayaraman	S. Nanjappa	03:47
2	"Shivane Endodane"	C. S. Jayaraman	S. Nanjappa	03:28
3	"Kaayo Tandeye Seva Karunisee"	C. S. Jayaraman	S. Nanjappa	02:51
4	"Yennodey Noo Aemba.... Yennodayaa Bava Banthu"	C. S. Jayaraman	S. Nanjappa	03:02
5	"Daari Kaadu Naa Balu Nonde"	M. L. Vasanthakumari	S. Nanjappa	03:05
6	"Aasha Gaganadhe.... Vidhi Gaidha"	T. S. Bagavathi	S. Nanjappa	03:02
7	"Dayaamayaa Eshaa"	T. S. Bagavathi	S. Nanjappa	02:03
8	"Saaku Saaku Navamohana"	T. S. Bagavathi	S. Nanjappa	02:49
9	"Naliyuva Baa Iniyaa"	T. S. Bagavathi	S. Nanjappa	02:42
10		C. S. Jayaraman	S. Nanjappa	
11	"Aasha Gaganade"	T. S. Bagavathi	S. Nanjappa	03:21
12	"Maayege Siluki Marulade Manuja"	T.A. Moti	S. Nanjappa	02:53
13	"Sringeri Geervani"	P. Susheela	S. Nanjappa	03:11

=== Tamil tracklist ===
Additional song was composed by G. Govindarajulu Naidu. Playback singers are T. M. Soundararajan, T. A. Mothi, Thiruchi Loganathan, M. L. Vasanthakumari, T. S. Bagavathi, Radha Jayalakshmi & P. Susheela.

Track#	Song	Singer(s)	Length (m:ss)
1	"Ennappan Andro Endhan"	TM Soundararajan	03:47
2	"Sivane Endradhudan Manathil"	TM Soundararajan	03:28
3	"Karo Thandhaiye Dhevaa Arulnidhi"	TM Soundararajan	02:51
4	"En Manamum Iruladhanil.... Ennudaiyaai Bhava Bandham"	TM Soundararajan	03:12
5	"Thedi Thedi Naan Manam Nondhen"	ML Vasanthakumari	03:05
6	"Aasai Kadalile.... Vidhi Seidha Mosatthinaale"	TS Bhagavathi	03:02
7	"Dhayaa Mayaa Eesa"	TS Bhagavathi	02:03
8	"Thaarum Thaarum Navamoganaa"	Radha Jayalakshmi	02:49
9	"Azhaguru Maalai Idhe"	TS Bhagavathi	02:42
10	"Dhaasano Dhaasan Nee"	TM Soundararajan	00:44
11		TS Bhagavathi	03:21
12	"Maayaiyin Irulil Marulaadhe Manidha"	TA Mothi	02:53
13		P Susheela	03:11
14	"Aasaikkoru Aann Pillai"	Tiruchi Loganathan & TS Bhagavathi	03:02

== Release and reception ==
When the film was ready, there were no distributors willing to pick it up. But thanks to the intervention of the chief minister of the state, S. Nijalingappa, they could release it through Karnataka Films. The owners of New Opera theatre in Mysore, where it ran for a 100 days, thought that at best it would run for two weeks. But they were in for a big shock when people from different parts of the state streamed in to watch the film. Among those who turned up for the first show at Mysore, was Rajkumar himself with his father. The Tamil version, Vedan Kannappa was also a hit.

== Awards ==
- National Film Awards
  - 2nd National Film Awards (1954) - Certificate of Merit for the Best Feature Film in Kannada

== Legacy ==
The film is often regarded by critics as a landmark film in Kannada film history. The film also became the first Kannada film to gain national recognition as it became the first film to win the Certificate of Merit for the Best Feature Film in Kannada. The success of the film was reported to have spurred the pace of production of Kannada language films significantly. Bedara Kannappa acquired cult status in Kannada cinema and became a trendsetter for dialogues and acting for later Kannada films. Michael Patrao of Deccan Herald wrote, "This film turned out to be a landmark in Kannada cinema for more than one reason. It was the first film in Kannada to win recognition at the national level by getting a certificate of merit. But most important of all, it launched Rajkumar, one of the greatest artistes of Kannada cinema."
