= Bharathi (1948 film) =

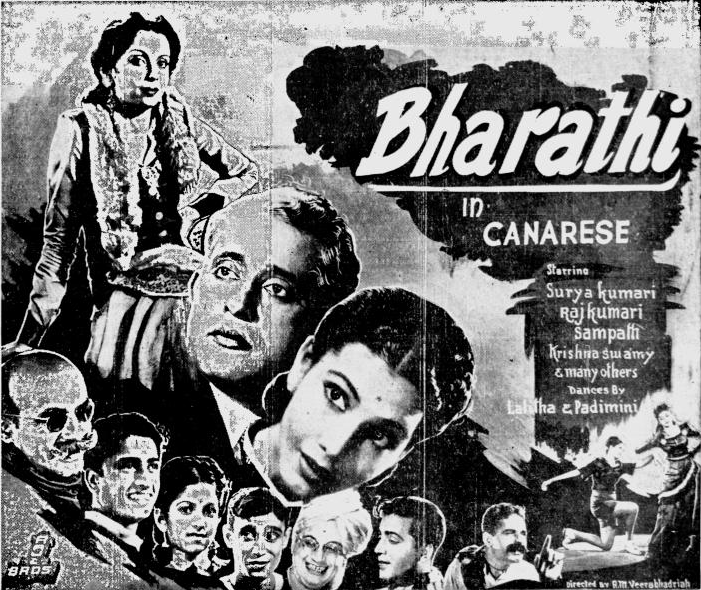
- Theatrical release poster
- Directed by: R. M. Veerabhadraiah
- Starring: Tanguturi Suryakumari: Rajkumari; Sampath; Krishnaswamy
- Music by: Chandrashekaraiah
- Production company: Navjyoti
- Release date: December 1948
- Country: India
- Language: Kannada

Bharathi is a 1948 Indian Kannada film directed by R. M. Veerabhadraiah. It stars Tanguturi Suryakumari, Rajkumari, Sampath, making his debut, and M. V. Krishnaswamy in the lead roles. The screenplay, dialogues and songs for the film were written by M. Narendrababu.

About the plot of the film, The Indian Express wrote, "The story aims at giving salutary guidance to our modern womenfolk from blindly apeing western civilisation, forgetting India's time-honoured traditions. It appeals for promoting of indigenous culture while assimilating the best in the Occident."

== Cast ==
- Tanguturi Suryakumari
- Rajkumari
- Sampath
- M. V. Krishnaswamy
- Madhava Rao
