= Shiv Bhakta =

1955 Indian film

- Poster
- Shiv Bhakta
- Directed by: H. L. N. Simha
- Produced by: A. V. Meiyappan
- Starring: Shahu Modak; Padmini
- Cinematography: Marutirao V. Kale
- Edited by: K. Shankar
- Music by: Chitragupta
- Distributed by: AVM Productions
- Release date: 1 January 1955
- Running time: 145 min
- Country: India
- Language: Hindi

Shiv Bhakta also spelt as Shiv-Bhakta (transl. Devotee of lord Shiva) is a 1955 Indian Hindi-language Hindu epic film directed by H.L.N. Simha starring Shahu Modak and Padmini in lead roles. It was a mythological film produced by AVM productions and it was directed by H. L. N. Simha with music by Chitrgupta. The songs were penned by Gopal Singh Nepali. Songs were considered evergreen. There are excellent classical dances by Padmini in this film. This was Padmini's second Hindi film followed by Mr. Sampat (1952). The film is a remake of director - producer duo's 1954 Kannada film Bedara Kannappa which was Kannada superstar Dr Rajkumar's first movie in a lead role.

== Cast ==
- Shahu Modak as Deena
- Padmini as Rani
- Ragini as Chintamani
- Pandari Bai as Neela
- Mishra as Kailashnath Shastri
- Anant Kumar as Kashinath Shastri
- Kumari Devi as Gauri Shastri
- Sope as Young Neela
- Rushyendramani as Rani's mother
- Ramachandra Shastry as Lord Shiva
- Deshraj as Young Deena

== Songs ==
The music was composed by Chitragupt and the lyrics were written by Gopal Singh Nepali.

Songs List of Shiv Bhakta 1955
Song	Singer
"Kailashnath Prabhu"	Lata Mangeshkar
"Kahan Jake Yeh Naina"	Lata Mangeshkar
"Main To Bar Bar Nachi"	Lata Mangeshkar
"Dekho Ji Meri Or"	Lata Mangeshkar
"O Duniya Ke Malik"	Mohammed Rafi
"Prabhu Tere Charan"	Mohammed Rafi
"Shiv Shankar Mil Gaye"	Mohammed Rafi
"Humko Tera Naam Lene"	Mohammed Rafi
"Jise Banana, Use Mitana Kaam Tera"	Mohammed Rafi, Asha Bhosle
"Laj Lage Ghunghat Na Khol Balma"	Mohammed Rafi, Asha Bhosle
"Mile Ameeri Ya Fakeeri"	Asha Bhosle
"Maya Ke Hirnon Ke"	Manna Dey
"Jo Nari Tujhe Bhakti Se"	Geeta Dutt
