= Suryakumari =

Indian singer, actress and dancer (1925–2005)

Tanguturi Suryakumari
- Born: 13 November 1925; Rajahmundry, Madras Presidency, British India (today in Andhra Pradesh, India)
- Died: 25 April 2005 (aged 79); London, England, UK
- Other name: Tanguturu Suryakumari
- Occupations: Model, singer, actress, dancer
- Spouse: Harold Elvin

Tanguturi Suryakumari (13 November 1925 – 25 April 2005), also known by her married name Suryakumari Elvin, was an Indian singer, actress and dancer in Telugu cinema. She sang "Maa Telugu Thalliki", the official song of the State of Andhra Pradesh. She was the winner of Miss Madras 1952 pageant and runner-up of the Miss India 1952 pageant. She was the niece of activist and politician Tanguturi Prakasam, who served as the first chief minister of Andhra state and previously as the chief minister of Madras.

As an actress, she has won the Outer Critics Circle Award for best actress, for playing Queen Sudarshana, in Rabindranath Tagore’s Off-Broadway play The King of the Dark Chamber in 1961.

== Career ==
Suryakumari was a film star at the age of 12, when a special part was written into the film Vipranarayana (1937) to accommodate her singing talents.

Suryakumari's next film Adrushtam (1939) was a success. Her other films include Katakam (1948) and Samsara Nowka (1949). Katakam was at first a Tamil play based on the William Shakespeare play Cymbeline. Suryakumari acted in the Tamil version of the film. Tanguturi Suryakumari later acted in some 25 films. Among these films, Devatha and Raithu Bidda made film history and contributed to the Golden age of Telugu Cinema. In the film, Krishna Prema by H. V. Babu, Suryakumari played the role of sage Narada. And it was first time in the history of Telugu cinema; a woman played the male role of Narada. In this film, for the first time, Surya Kumari's singing talents were fully utilised as Narada and her performance won her many laurels. Tanguturi Suryakumari also acted in Hindi movies Watan (1954) and Uran Khatola (1955). In the second one, Tanguturi Suryakumari acted with Hindi movie icon Dilip Kumar and was nominated for Best Supporting Actress award in the Filmfare Awards.

=== As singer ===
Apart from her film career, Tanguturi Suryakumari was also well known for her private songs released as gramophone records and later as audiocassettes. The songs were melodious and had impressive lyrics. Her sweet voice added beauty to these songs. Tanguturi Suryakumari also sang some patriotic songs and in few of them Tanguturi Suryakumari praised Mahatma Gandhi. There were numerous songs sung by Suryakumari of which few of them are "Maa Telugu Talliki", "Mallepoodhandalu", "O Mahatma", "Satapatra Sundari", "Maamidichettunu" and others. Tanguturi Suryakumari also sang in a feature-length documentary film about Mahatma Gandhi, which was made by a patriotic Tamil writer and journalist, A. K. Chettiar.

Record companies came forward to record her voice, and at a time when gramophones were not yet common, her songs could be heard everywhere. Patrons in restaurants and outdoor cafes would pay extra if their meal was accompanied by Surya's songs, and passing traffic would stop until a song had finished. Her presence was a major attraction at meetings of the Indian National Congress, and her recordings reached rural areas unvisited by politicians. Even today, her most famous song, "Maa Telugu Thalli" (in praise of her mother tongue), is sung at the start of social functions in her home state of Andhra.

== Filmography ==
Year	Title	Role	Language	Notes
1937	Vipranarayana		Telugu	Debut Film
1939	Raithu Bidda		Telugu	
1939	Jayaprada		Telugu	
1939	Adrishtam		Tamil	
1941	Devata	Seetha	Telugu	
1941	Chandrahasa		Telugu	
1941	Abla		Hindi	
1942	Deenabandhu		Telugu	
1943	Bhakta Pothana		Telugu	
1943	Krishna Prema		Telugu	
1943	Bhagyalakshmi		Telugu	
1947	Kadagam		Tamil	
1948	Gitanjali		Telugu	
1948	Samsara Nauka		Tamil	
1948	Bharathi		Kannada	
1950	Adrushta Deepudu		Telugu	
1951	Manamagal		Tamil	
1952	Maradalu Pelli		Telugu	
1954	Watan		Hindi	
1955	Uran Khatola		Hindi	
1964	Ramadasu	Sitara Begum	Telugu	
1965	Mahasathi Anasuya		Kannada	

== Career in the West ==
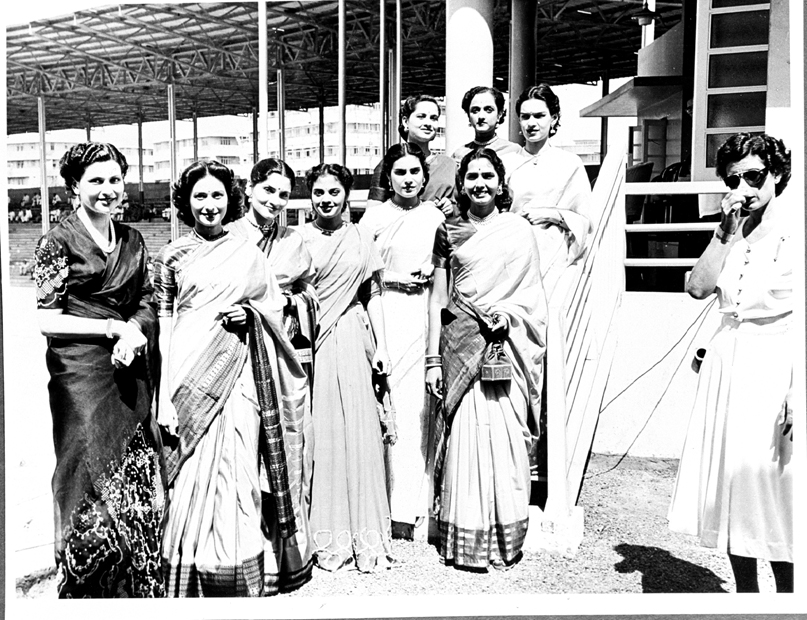
Suryakumari (sixth from left) along with other contestants at the 1952 Miss India pageant in Bombay

Altogether, Surya appeared in some 25 Indian films in the 1940s and 1950s, singing and acting in a variety of languages, including Telugu, Sanskrit, Tamil, Gujarati, Hindi and English.

She had her film admirers too, for her films like Raithu Bidda (1939), Bhagyalakshmi (1943), Krishna Prema (1943), Maradalu Pelli (1952) and Hindi films Watan (1954), Uran Khatola (1955).

In the mid-1950s, she made her first visit to the US, as a member of a delegation from the Indian film industry invited to Hollywood by the Motion Picture Association of America (though union regulations precluded her from film work there).

In 1959, she went to New York to teach at the Columbia University, and also to add to her skills by studying western classical and popular dance forms. On her arrival, she appeared on television alongside the Indian ambassador and sang Indian songs. Making her debut stage appearance in American theatre, she portrayed Queen Sudarshana in Rabindranath Tagore's play The King of the Dark Chamber in Jan Hus Playhouse Theater, in February 1961. Commending her performance, Red Bank Register wrote that she "displayed luminous artistry to match appealing beauty." For the performance, she was awarded the Off-Broadway Award Critics' Award for Best Actress. Suryakumari had an acquaintance with the great Alfred Hitchcock. She also took the role of Princess Chitra in the dance production of Tagore's Chitra for CBS, and researched Indian stories for Alfred Hitchcock.

=== Journey to London ===
In 1965, Suryakumari travelled to London. Scheduled to play the Hindu deity Kali in Kindly Monkeys, a new play at the Arts Theatre, she decided at the end of the run to stay on and found India Performing Arts in Kensington with her husband Harold Elvin, a project to train performers and mount productions. Annual performances by Suryakumari herself, her students and fellow artists followed at the Purcell Room, in the South Bank Centre, for the next 40 years.

From 1973, Surya was supported in her work by her husband, Harold Elvin, poet, painter and potter, reading his poetry and telling his stories as she sang and played the tanpura and sitar.

Something of the flavour of these gatherings may be gained from the programmes for two events in 1982, with schoolchildren appearing alongside Ben Kingsley in Homage To Mahatma Gandhi, and Larry Adler's harmonica improvisations (complemented by Surya's instrumental accompaniment) in An Indian Pageant. Surya's political commitments were engrained in all her work, whether as chief singer at the Gandhi centenary commemoration at St Paul's cathedral in 1969, or with the Hordaland Teater of Bergen, for children in Norway, with whom she worked from 1991 to 1998. He predeceased her. Tanguturi Suryakumari, a singer, actor and dancer, died on 25 April 2005, aged 79.
