= Mulla (surname) =

Mulla is a surname. It is distinct from Mulla(h), which is a title that is occasionally prefixed to the name of a cleric.

== Notable persons ==
- Ali Ahmed Mulla, muazzin of Masjid al-Haram, Mecca, Saudi Arabia
- Anand Narain Mulla (1901–1997), Urdu poet of India
- Asif Mulla (born 1980), Indian-born Canadian cricketer
- Fateen Mulla, Israeli Druze politician
- Jagat Narain Mulla (1864–1938), lawyer and public prosecutor of India
- Mahendra Nath Mulla, officer of the Indian Navy
- Mohsin Mulla (born 1981), Indian-born Canadian cricketer
- Paul Mulla (1882–1959), Turkish Cretan Catholic priest
