= Moola Venkata Rangaiah =

Indian film producer

- Born: Tadpatri, Andhra Pradesh, India
- Died: 12 May 2004; Tadpatri, Andhra Pradesh, India
- Occupations: Business, ex municipal chair, Tadipatri

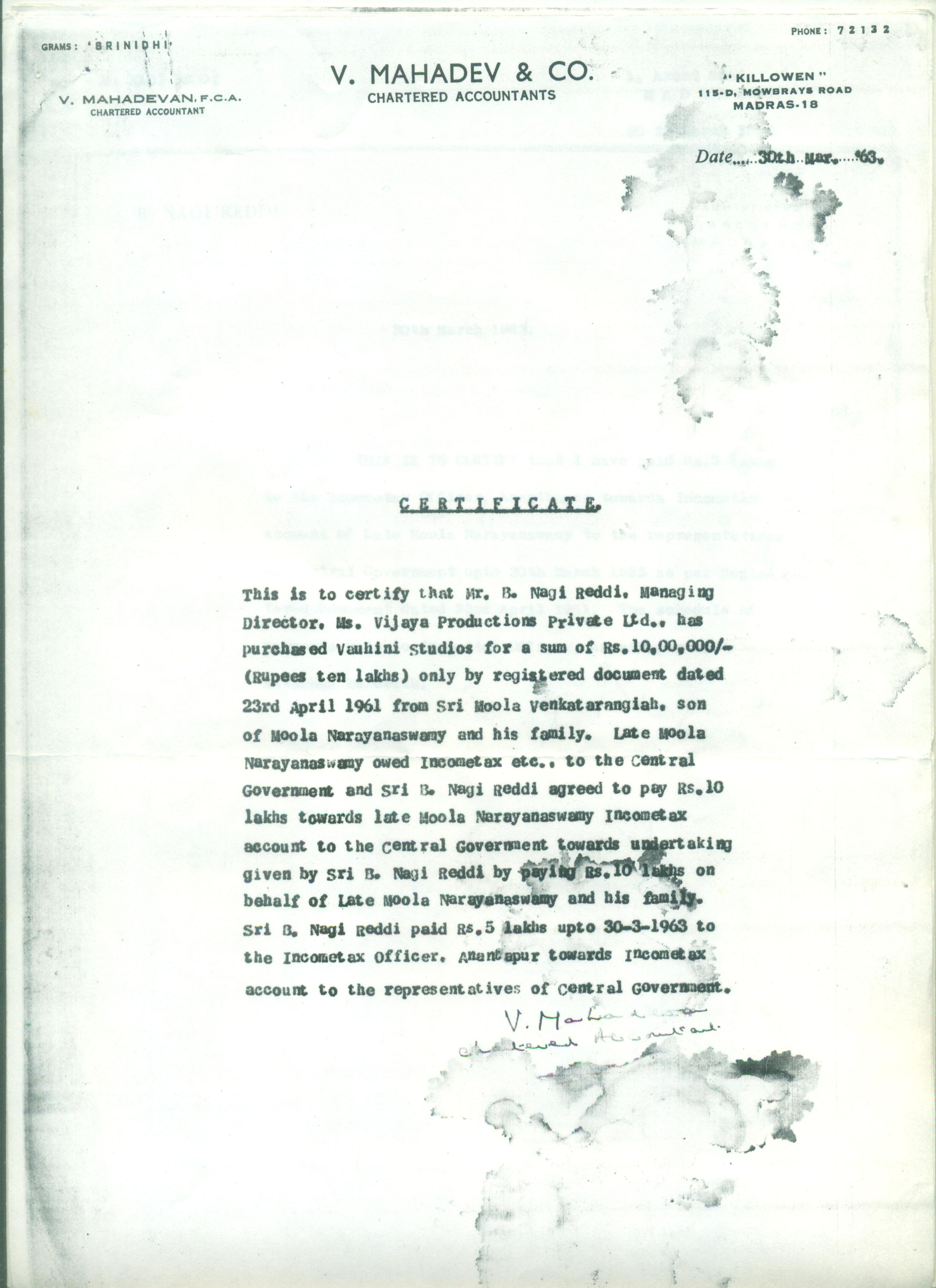
Sale of Vauhini Studios by Moola V. Rangaiah to Nagi Reddy

Moola Venkata Rangaiah was an Indian film producer, known for his works in Telugu cinema, and Tamil cinema. He was the co-owner Vauhini Studios, along with his father Moola Narayana Swamy, which became one of the largest production companies in South Asia at that time.

== Background ==
After the death of Narayana Swamy died in 1951, In 1961, B.Nagi Reddy acquired Vauhini Studios, and later renamed it to Vijaya Vauhini Studios.
