= Kalahasti Mahatyam =

- Theatrical release poster
- Directed by: H. L. N. Simha
- Produced by: C. R. Basavaraju; Gubbi Veeranna
- Starring: Dr. Rajkumar; K. Malathi; Mudigonda Lingamurthy; B. Padmanabham; Rushyendramani
- Cinematography: S. Maruthi Rao
- Edited by: K. Shankar
- Music by: R. Sudarshanam and R. Goverdhanam as Associate
- Release date: 12 November 1954
- Running time: 165 minutes
- Country: India
- Language: Telugu

Kalahasti Mahatyam is a 1954 Indian Telugu-language film directed by H. L. N. Simha starring Dr. Rajkumar. This is the only non-Kannada film fearuring Dr. Rajkumar.

It is a musical hit film with some melodious Bhakti songs written by Tholeti Venkata Reddy. The music score is provided by R. Sudarshanam and R. Goverdhanam as Associate. They are beautifully sung by Ghantasala Venkateswara Rao, M. L. Vasantha Kumari, A.M. Raja and P. Susheela.

The film is a remake of the 1954 Kannada film Bedara Kannappa which also starred Rajkumar in the lead role.This film was successful in Andhra Pradesh and screened more than 100 days.

== Plot ==
The story is that of Kannappa, a noted Shiva Bhakta.

== Cast ==
Character	Actor / Actress
Thinnayya / Kannappa	Rajkumar
Neela, wife of Thinnayya	K. Malathi
Young Thinnayya	Ratan
Young Neela	Kusalakumari
Kailasanatha Sastry	Mudigonda Lingamurthy
Gowri, Wife of Kailasanath	Kumari
Kasinatha Sastry, son of Kailasanath	Padmanabham
Lord Shiva	H. R. Ramachandra Sastry
Parvathi	Yellamma Devi
Srihari	Rushyendramani
Chintamani	Rajasulochana
Basavareddy	A. V. Subba Rao
	M. R. Dasappa
	M. R. Nanjappa
	Narayana
	S. R. Raju

== Soundtrack ==
- Ashale... Vidhi Vratale Eduraye -
- Chemma Chekka Ladadam - Singers: A.M Raja, P. Susheela
- Jaya Jaya Mahadeva (Singer: Ghantasala)
- Madhuram Shiva Mantram Madilo Maruvake O Manasa (Lyrics: Tholeti; Singer: Ghantasala)
- Mahesa Papavinasa Kailasa Vasa Eesa (Lyrics: Tholeti; Singer: Ghantasala Venkateswara Rao)
- Mayajalamuna Munigevu Naruda -
- Shri Kalahastiswara Swamy Jejelivi Gonuma -
- Shri Parvathi Devi Chekove Shailakumari (Lyrics: Tholeti; Singer: P. Susheela)

== See also ==
- Kalahasti temple
- Bedara Kannappa, a 1954 Kannada film
- Bhakta Kannappa, a 1976 Telugu film
