= The First and the Last (play) =

1919 play by John Galsworthy

The First and the Last is a 1919 play by the British writer John Galsworthy. It was based on a short story published in 1917. It was staged successfully in the early 1920s by Basil Dean featuring the actors Owen Nares and Meggie Albanesi. In 1937, it was adapted by Dean for the film 21 Days, which was not released until 1940, starring Laurence Olivier and Vivien Leigh.

Burt Lancaster and Harold Hecht also procured the filming rights in 1948, hoping to produce the movie through their film production company Norma Productions. The film was to star Marlon Brando and Meg Mundy before it fell through.

In 1933 a radio adaptation in Czech První a poslední directed by Josef Bezdíček) was broadcast on Czech radio.

== Bibliography ==
- Cody, Gabrielle H. & Sprinchorn, Evert. The Columbia encyclopedia of modern drama, Volume 1. Columbia University Press, 2007.
- Sweet, Matthew. Shepperton Babylon: The Lost Worlds of British Cinema. Faber and Faber, 2005.
