= E. Kothapalli =

- Village
- Interactive map of E. Kothapalli
- Location within Andhra Pradesh
- Coordinates: 14.38991°N 78.18209°E
- Country: India
- State: Andhra Pradesh
- District: Cuddapah
- Mandal: Pulivendula
- Elevation: 398 m (1,306 ft)

Languages
  - Official: Telugu, Urdu
- Time zone: UTC+5:30 (IST)
- STD code: 08568

E.Kothapalli is a village and panchayat in Pulivendula mandal, Kadapa district, in the state of Andhra Pradesh in India.
