= Kot Maulvi =

Coordinates: 31°56′N 74°56′E

- Village
- Interactive map of Kot Maulvi
- Country: India
- State: Punjab
- District: Gurdaspur
- Tehsil: Dera Baba Nanak
- Region: Majha

Government
  - Type: Panchayat raj
  - Body: Gram panchayat

Area
  - Total: 219 ha (540 acres)

Population (2011)
  - Total: 1,055; 565/490 ♂/♀
  - Scheduled Castes: 88; 46/42 ♂/♀
  - Total Households: 211

Languages
  - Official: Punjabi
- Time zone: UTC+5:30 (IST)
- Telephone: 01871
- ISO 3166 code: IN-PB
- Website: gurdaspur.nic.in

Kot Maulvi is a village in Dera Baba Nanak in Gurdaspur district of Punjab State, India. It is located 20 kilometres (12 mi) from sub district headquarter and 60 kilometres (37 mi) from district headquarter. The village is administrated by Sarpanch an elected representative of the village.

== Demography ==
As of 2011, the village has a total number of 211 houses and a population of 1055 of which 565 are males while 490 are females. According to the report published by Census India in 2011, out of the total population of the village 88 people are from Schedule Caste and the village does not have any Schedule Tribe population so far.

== See also ==
- List of villages in India
