= Sumangali (1940 film) =

- Theatrical release poster
- Directed by: B. N. Reddy
- Screenplay by: K. Ramnoth
- Story by: K. Ramnoth
- Dialogue by: Samudrala Sr.
- Produced by: B. N. Reddy
- Starring: V. Nagayya; A. S. Giri; Kumari; Malathi; Mudigonda Lingamurthy
- Cinematography: K. Ramnoth
- Edited by: K. Ramnoth
- Music by: V. Nagayya
- Release date: 1940
- Country: India
- Language: Telugu

Sumangali is a 1940 Telugu-language film directed and produced by B. N. Reddy. The film stars V. Nagayya, A. S. Giri, Kumari and Malathi. The main concept of the film widow remarriage is inspired by Kandukuri Veeresalingam.

== Plot ==
Satyam is a progressive man. He is loved by his cousin Parvati and Saraswathi. Saraswati, is an advanced thinking, rich woman, learns that she has been married and widowed as a child. Parvathi is an orthodox woman sacrifices her life. Sathyam and Saraswathi marry at the end supporting the film theme of widow marriages.

== Credits ==
=== Cast ===
- V. Nagayya as Panthulu
- A. S. Giri as Sathyam
- Kumari as Saraswathi
- Malathi as Parvati
- Mudigonda Lingamurthy
- Seshamamba
- Doraiswamy

=== Crew ===
- Director: B. N. Reddy
- Assistant Director: Kamalakara Kameswara Rao
- Story: K. Ramnoth
- Dialogues: Samudrala Sr.
- Producers: Moola Narayana Swamy and B. N. Reddy
- Production Company: Vauhini Studios
- Original Music: V. Nagayya
- Sound: A. Krishnan
- Cinematography: K. Ramnoth
- Production Designer: A. K. Sekhar
- Production Manager: K. V. Reddy
- Playback singers: V. Nagayya

== Songs ==
- "Aada Brathuke Madhuram"
- "Baala Pasupu Kumkuma Neeku"
- "Padave Koyila, Padake Koyila"
- "Kaatama Raayuda Kadiri Narasimhuda" (Lyrics: Samudrala Sr.; Music: V. Nagayya; Singers: Malathi and A. S. Rao)

== Reception ==
Although a commercial failure, Sumangali is considered a "classic" by critics.
