= Rajen Sheth =

Software engineer

Rajen Sheth is an executive at Google, where he currently runs product management at cloud AI and machine learning team. The idea of an enterprise version Google's email service Gmail was pitched by Rajen in a meeting with CEO Eric Schmidt in 2004. Schmidt initially rejected the proposal, arguing that the division should focus on web search, but the suggestion was later accepted. Sheth is known as "father of Google Apps", and is responsible for development of Chrome and ChromeOS for Business.

== Career ==
Rajen studied Computer Engineering (1994-1999) in Stanford University like Sergey Brin and Larry Page. He graduated with Electrical Engineering and got a master's degree in Computer Engineering from Stanford University in 1999 and then joined Microsoft. At that time, Microsoft was reshaping their email service, Hotmail. After a year at Microsoft, he moved to a Silicon Valley startup known as Zaplet, where he built what he calls “future email technologies.” In 2004, he joined Google.
