= M. T. Rajen =

M. T. Rajen (28 May 1886 – 14 July 1943), was a prominent movie entrepreneur of the early Tamil film era. He produced, distributed, directed and exhibited Tamil movies.

== Career ==
Rajen showed an entrepreneurial streak very early in his life. He went to Burma on his own at a very early age to work for the railways there and returned to make his fortune in the electrical contracting business, again a pioneering field those days. His firm M.T. Rajen & Co, established in 1914, electrified the Chettinad palaces.

As a serial entrepreneur he was quite successful and went on to establish a film production company, Vel Pictures, and a film distribution and exhibition company, Madras Theatres. The theatres, Prabhat, Broadway, Saraswathi and Kinema Central were all either run or owned by Madras Theatres Ltd. Rajen was also an investor in real estate properties and owned numerous prime properties in Madras. Rajen served as one of the founding fathers of the South India Film Chamber of Commerce, along with C. P. Sarathy, K. Subramaniam, S. Soundararajan, C.S.V. Iyer, V. Rama Rao and M.A. Venkatrama Naidu, and went on to become the founder President of the Chamber.

Rajen died on 14 July 1943, never recovering from a persistent bout of pneumonia. Currently M.T. Rajen & Co., a property management firm is successfully run along with its sister concerns, M.T. Rajen’s Pooncholai (Landscape and Indoor Plant Suppliers), established in 1988 and M.T. Rajen’s Farms (Horticulture Farms) established in 1990.
