= Vande Mataram (1939 film) =

Indian film

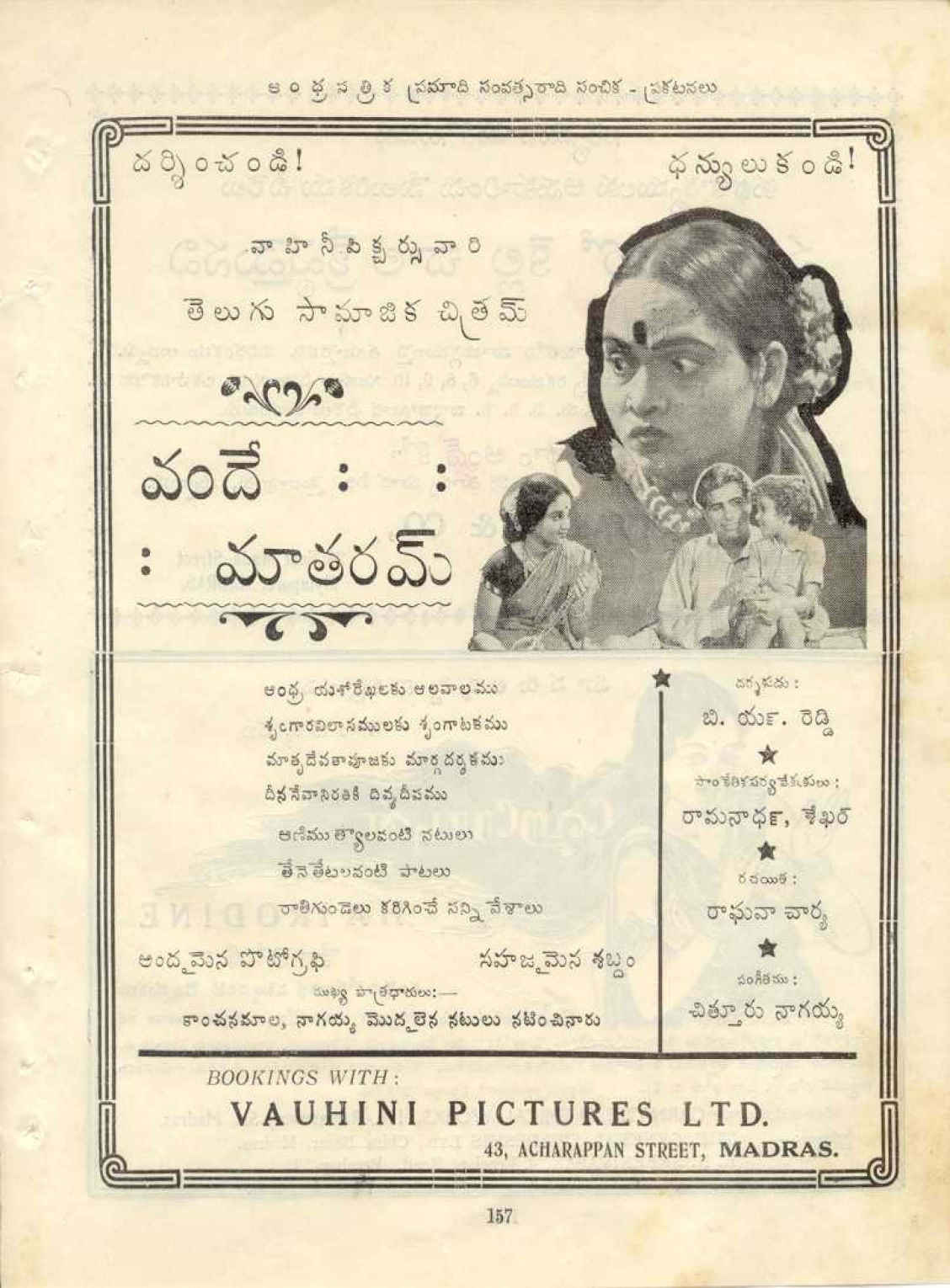
- Poster Design Published in Andhra Patrika Weekly
- Directed by: B. N. Reddy
- Written by: B. N. Reddy; Samudrala Raghavacharya (dialogues)
- Screenplay by: Ramnath
- Starring: V. Nagayya; Kanchanamala
- Cinematography: Ramnath
- Edited by: T. V. S. Mani
- Music by: V. Nagayya
- Production company: Vauhini
- Release date: 1939
- Country: India
- Language: Telugu

Vande Mataram (transl. Hail to the mother!) is a 1939 Indian Telugu-language film directed by B. N. Reddy and starring V. Nagayya and Kanchanamala. The story is based on Reddy's short story Mangala Sutra. The film was a box office success.

== Cast ==
- Nagayya as Raghu
- Kanchanamala as Janaki
