= Mulah =

Mulah މުލައް
- Inhabited island
- Location in Maldives
- Coordinates: 02°56′50″N 73°35′05″E
- Country: Maldives
- Administrative atoll: Meemu Atoll
- Distance to Malé: 136.06 km (84.54 mi)

Dimensions
  - Length: 1.400 km (0.870 mi)
  - Width: 0.500 km (0.311 mi)

Population (2022)
  - Total: 1,426 (including foreigners)
- Time zone: UTC+05:00 (MST)

Mulah (Dhivehi: މުލައް) or Boli Mulah is one of the inhabited islands of Meemu Atoll.

== Geography ==
The island is 136.06 km (85 mi; 73 nmi) south of the country's capital, Malé. The land area of the island is 68.4 ha (169 acres) in 2018. The island was described as having an area of 57.8 ha (143 acres) in 2007.

== Demography ==
Historical population
Year	Pop.	±%
2006	1,129	—
2014	1,195	+5.8%
2022	1,426	+19.3%
2006–2022: Census populations Source:

== Healthcare ==
Boli Mulah has a medical centre and a pharmacy.

== Utilities ==
Sewage facilities were contracted to be built by September 2015, and safe drinking water was contracted to be provided for the island from December 2014. The sewage system was officially opened in July 2018 by President Abdulla Yameen.
