= B.N. Reddi =

Indian film director, producer and screenwriter (1908–1977)

B. N. Reddy
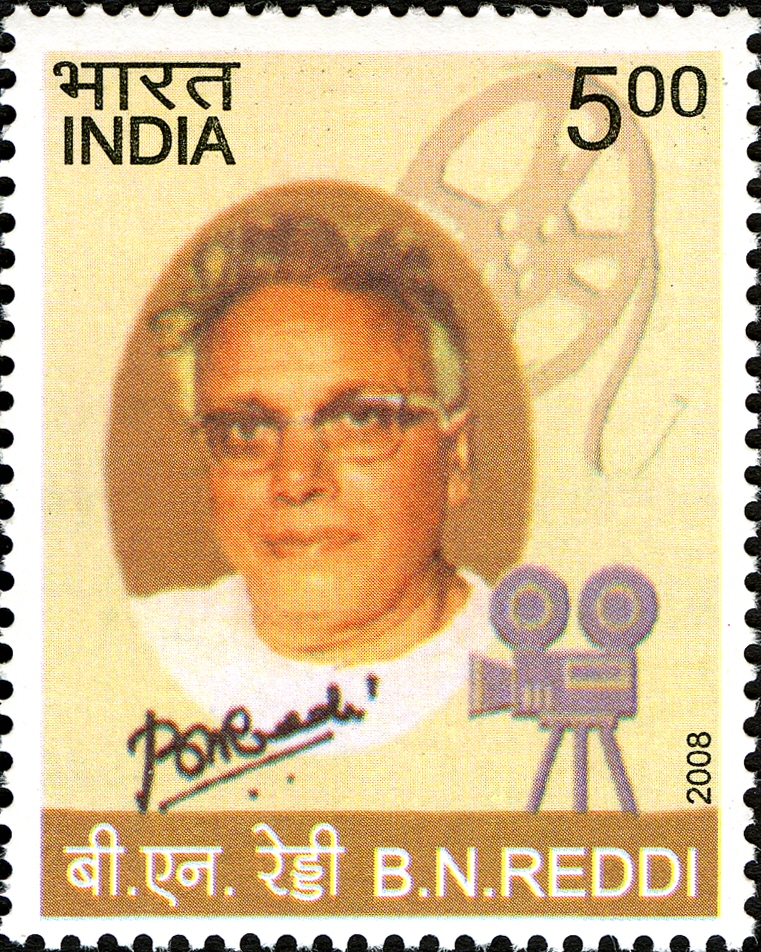
- B. N. Reddy in a 2008 stamp
- Born: Bommireddy Narasimha Reddy; 16 November 1908; Y. Kothapalli, Simhadripuram, Madras Presidency, British India (present-day Andhra Pradesh, India)
- Died: 8 November 1977 (aged 68); Madras, Tamil Nadu, India
- Occupations: Producer; presenter; story writer; businessman; philanthropy
- Years active: 1939–1969
- Awards: Padma Bhushan; Doctor of Letters; Dadasaheb Phalke Award; National Film Awards

Bommireddi Narasimha Reddy (16 November 1908 – 8 November 1977), professionally known as B. N. Reddy, was an Indian film director, producer, and screenwriter. He was an early figure in the Telugu cinema. Many of his earlier films like Vande Mataram (1939), Devatha (1941) had V. Nagayya as the lead. His Malliswari (1951) starring N. T. Rama Rao and Bhanumathi is considered a timeless Indian film classic. Reddi was the first film personality to receive the Dadasaheb Phalke Award from South India the highest honorary award of Indian cinema. He was awarded India's third highest civilian honour the Padmabhushan, and the Doctor of Letters.

== Early life ==
Narasimha Reddy was born on 16 November 1908 in a farmer family at Y. Kothapalli village in the present-day Kadapa district. His father Narasimha Reddi used to export onions from Chennai to Rangoon (Yangoon) for a living. He was eldest of four brothers; others are Nagi Reddi, B. N. Konda Reddi and B. Ramalinga Reddi.

He was schooled in Proddatur and later continued the schooling in Madras. He enrolled in Pachaiyappa's College, but left without graduating. He later studies auditing and accounting and worked as an apprentice in an auditing firm.

== Career ==
When H. M. Reddi decided to turn a producer, B.N. Reddi and B. Nagi Reddi joined hands with him to form Rohini Pictures.

== Awards ==
Civilian honours

- Padmabhushan

National honours

- Doctor of letters

National Film Awards

- 1955 – President's Silver Medal for Best Feature Film in Telugu – Bangaru Papa
- 1957 – Certificate of Merit for Best Feature Film in Telugu – Bhagya Rekha
- 1966 – National Film Award for Best Feature Film in Telugu – Rangula Ratnam
- 1974 – Dadasaheb Phalke Award at the 22nd National Film Awards

Filmfare Awards

- Filmfare Best Film Award (Telugu) – Bangaru Panjaram (1969)

Nandi Awards

- Best Feature Film - Gold - Rangula Ratnam (1966)
- Third Best Feature Film - Bronze - Bangaru Panjaram (1969)
- Best Story Writer - Pelli Kani Pelli (1976)

== Filmography ==
B. N. Reddi directed 11 feature films.

Directed features
Year	Title	Direction	Screenplay	Story	Producer
1939	Vande Mataram	Yes	No	Yes	Yes
1940	Sumangali	Yes	No	No	Yes
1941	Devatha	Yes	No	No	Yes
1945	Swarga Seema	Yes	Yes	No	Yes
1951	Malliswari	Yes	No	No	Yes
1954	Bangaru Papa	Yes	Yes	No	Yes
1957	Bhagya Rekha	Yes	Yes	No	No
1959	Raja Makutam	Yes	Yes	No	Yes
1964	Pooja Phalam	Yes	Yes	No	No
1966	Rangula Ratnam	Yes	Yes	No	Yes
1969	Bangaru Panjaram	Yes	Yes	No	Yes

=== Producer ===
- Bhakta Pothana (1942) - Production supervision
