= Vauhini Studios =

Indian film production company

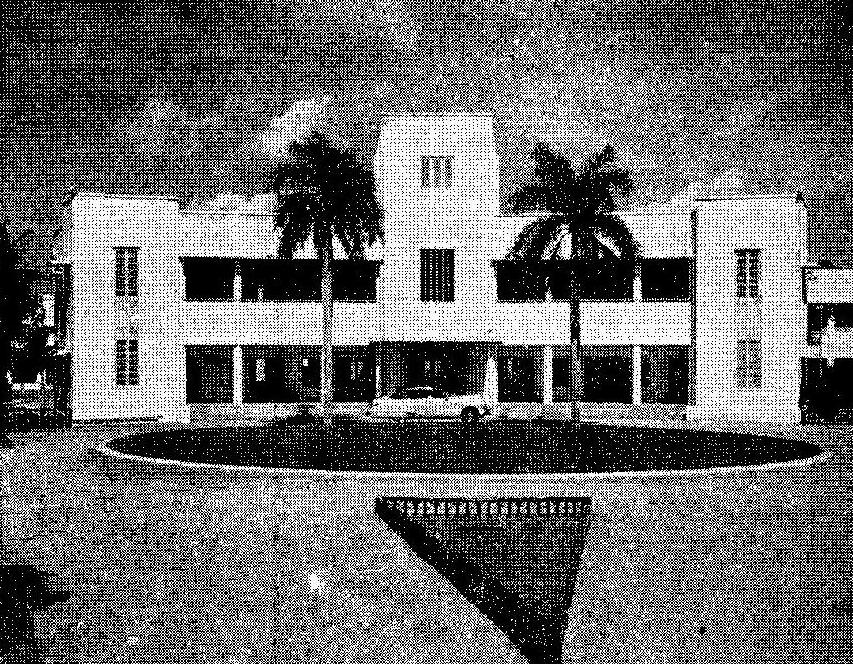
- Type: Limited
- Industry: Motion pictures
- Predecessor: Vauhini Productions; Vauhini Pictures; Rohini Pictures
- Founded: 1948
- Founder: Moola Narayana Swamy; B. N. Reddy
- Fate: Liquidated
- Headquarters: Vadapalani, Madras, Madras Presidency, India
- Area served: India
- Key people: Moola Narayana Swamy; B. N. Reddy; K. V. Reddy; Moola Venkata Rangaiah

Vauhini Studios was an Indian film production company and studio facility in Madras. It was founded by Moola Narayana Swamy and B. N. Reddy (Bommireddy Narasimha Reddy). In later years, Nagi Reddi, owner of Vijaya Productions, acquired Vauhini studios on lease. In 1961, Nagi Reddi purchased Vauhini Studios from Narayana Swamy's son Moola Venkata Rangaiah and merged it with his Vijaya Productions and named it Vijaya Vauhini Studios.

== History ==
Rohini Pictures was formed by the partnership of H. M. Reddy along with B. N. Reddy and Moola Narayana Swamy. The latter two had differences with H. M. Reddy and split themselves from Rohini Pictures and established Vauhini Pictures. Narayana Swamy was the Chairman and B. N. Reddy was the Managing Director of the company. K. V. Reddy, a close friend of Narayana Swamy also joined Vauhini Pictures along with them and was also made a partner in the company. Films like Vande Mataram (1939), Sumangali (1940), and Devatha (1941) were made under the Vauhini Pictures banner and directed by B. N. Reddy.

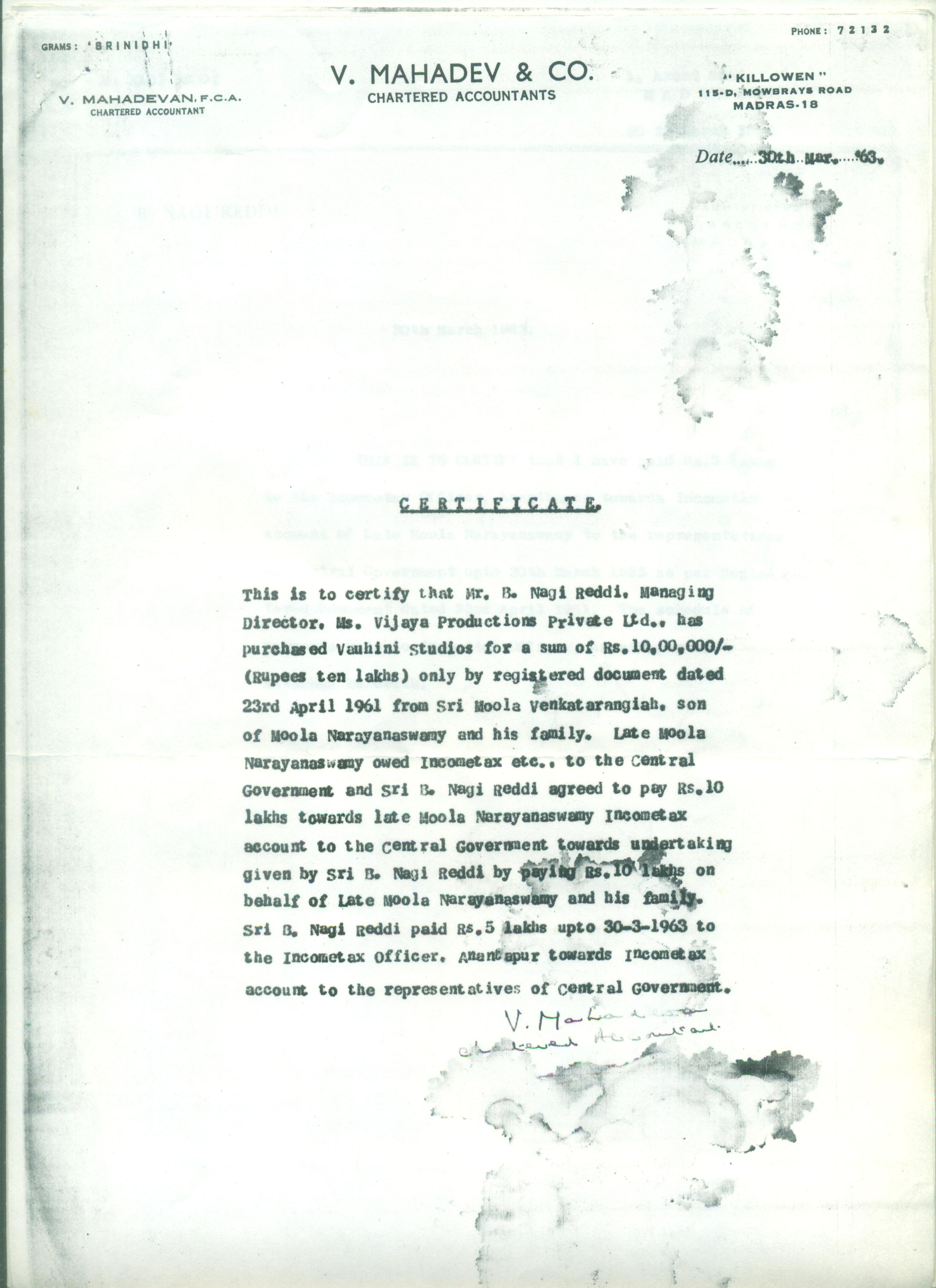
Sale of Vauhini studios by Moola V. Rangaiah to Nagi Reddy

K. V. Reddy directed Bhakta Pothana (1943) for the company as his maiden directorial venture. After the huge success of the film, Narayana Swamy who had interests in other business ventures focused on film production. He made a proposal to the board to confine Vauhini Pictures to film distribution and start Vauhini Productions for film production. The proposal was approved, and Narayana Swamy invested ₹2 lakh out of the total capital of ₹2.5 lakh. The rest of the ₹50,000 was provided by the family of B. N. Reddy and K. V. Reddy. It was decided that B. N. Reddy and K. V. Reddy would alternately direct films for the production house.

When Vauhini Productions made Swargaseema (1945) as its first production under the direction of B. N. Reddy, K. V. Reddy worked as a production manager for the film. Later, K. V. Reddy directed Yogi Vemana (1947) under Vauhini Productions banner.

Around the same time, Vauhini Productions' films were getting delayed due to a lack of studio facilities. And so, they decided to build a studio of their own. Narayana Swamy invested the capital required for building the studio while B. N. Reddy took up the responsibility of managing the construction work. Thus, Vauhini Studios came into being. The first film produced by Vauhini Studios was Gunasundari Katha (1949).

Narayana Swamy's properties and businesses were seized due to income tax problems. He was fined around ₹30 lakh. Vauhini studio was hence leased, to Vijaya Productions, to save it from income tax department's attachment. In 1961, Nagi Reddi, the Managing Director of Vijaya Productions, purchased Vauhini Studios for ₹10 lakh from Narayana Swamy's son Moola Venkata Rangaiah and merged it with his Vijaya Productions and named it Vijaya Vauhini Studios.

== Films produced ==
Moola Narayana Swamy

Vauhini Pictures

- Vande Mataram (1939)
- Sumangali (1940)
- Devatha (1941).
- Bhakta Pothana (1943)

Vauhini Productions

- Swargaseema (1945)
- Yogi Vemana (1947)
- Vaddante Dabbu
- Gunasundari Katha (1949)
- Malliswari (1951)
- Pedda Manushulu (1954)

== Bibliography ==
- D. V. Narasaraju (2004), Tera Venuka Kathalu, Hyderabad: Creative Links
