= M. G. Ramachandran filmography =

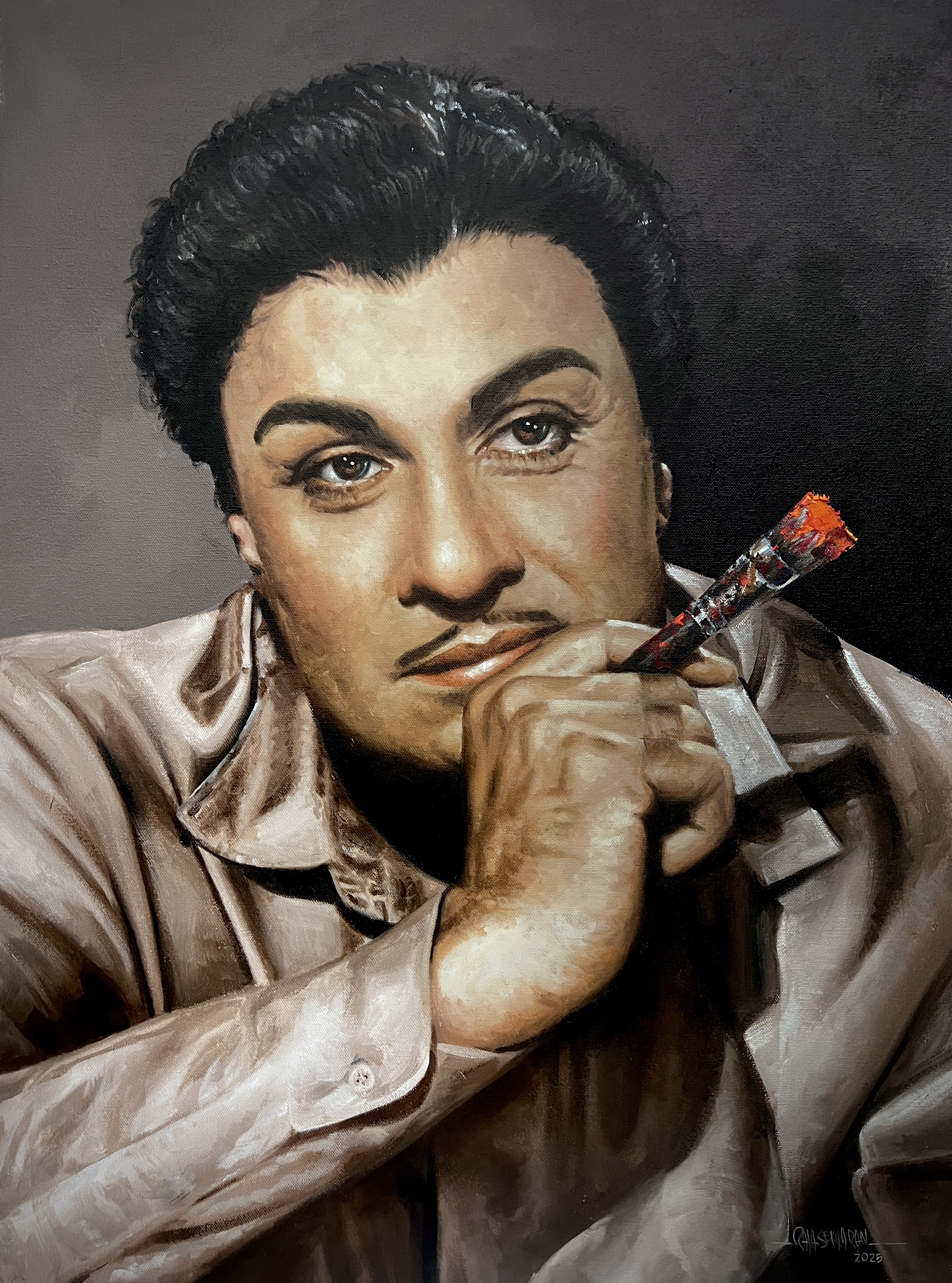
The portrait of young M. G. Ramachandran

M. G. Ramachandran (17 January 1917 – 24 December 1987), popularly known by his initials MGR, was an Indian actor, film director and film producer who had an extensive career primarily in Tamil language films. He was called Chinnavar in the film industry. After starring in numerous commercially successful films from the 1950s to the early 1970s, he has continued to hold a matinée idol status in Tamil Nadu. Ramachandran made his debut in Ellis R. Dungan's 1936 film Sathi Leelavathi, where he played a police inspector. He followed it with a string of minor appearances and supporting roles in many films, notably Ashok Kumar (1941), where he played the general of emperor Ashoka's army, and as a captain in Dungan's Meera (1945).

Ramachandran's breakthrough came with his first lead role in A. S. A. Sami's swashbuckler film Rajakumari (1947) where he played a villager who marries a princess. Based on the Arabian Nights, Rajakumari was a commercially successful venture. He established himself as an action hero akin to Errol Flynn and Douglas Fairbanks in Tamil cinema with Manthiri Kumari (1950) and Marmayogi (1951). Both films had political undertones which earned Ramachandran a Robin Hood persona of being a champion for the downtrodden. His performance as the caring brother Rajendran who tries to keep his family together in En Thangai (1952) earned him critical acclaim. In 1953, he made his debut in Malayalam films opposite B. S. Saroja in Genova. Ramachandran continued to play roles which enabled him to adopt his ideas of fighting injustice meted out to the poor such as an outlaw in Malaikkallan (1954), and Nadodi Mannan (1958). In the latter, he featured in dual roles, as a king and a commoner, for the first time in his career. Both Malaikkallan and Nadodi Mannan were commercially successful, becoming the highest-grossing films of their respective release years. In addition to social dramas, Ramachandran received positive feedback and commercial success for swashbuckler films such as Alibabavum 40 Thirudargalum (1956), the first South Indian full-length colour film, Madurai Veeran (1956), Chakravarthi Thirumagal and Mahadevi (both released in 1957).

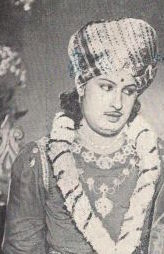
M. G. Ramachandran in Mohini (1948)

According to Ashish Rajadhyaksha and Paul Willemen in the book Encyclopedia of Indian Cinema, the success of Ramachandran's 1961 film Thirudathe, marked a beginning of transition to roles that had "a contemporary setting". He often played "a saintly member of an oppressed class". The act of showering love and affection on his family members was a recurring theme in his films during this period. The films he appeared in during the 1960s played a crucial part in his subsequent career as a politician. The 1963 comedy-drama film Periya Idathu Penn had him play a farmer who seeks revenge from his village's zamindar. (Note: The word zamindar refers to a landowner who leases his land to tenant farmers.) The following year, he appeared in Thozhilali as a bus conductor who exposes the fraudulent methods of a rival bus company, and in Padagotti as a fisherman who resolves to end the dispute between two fishing communities. In 1965, he collaborated with Tapi Chanakya in Enga Veettu Pillai, where in dual roles he featured as twins of opposite natures, one a coward and the other courageous.

He also featured in B. R. Panthulu's Aayirathil Oruvan the same year as a doctor who joins, and later becomes the leader of, a rebellion against a dictator. Both the films were major commercial successes. The romantic comedy Anbe Vaa (1966), where Ramachandran played an industrialist in his only AVM Productions film, is considered an antithesis of the roles he was doing during this period and was also commercially successful. He continued to achieve success at the box office with films like Arasa Kattalai and Kaavalkaaran (both released in 1967), also garnering acclaim for the latter. Ramachandran's portrayal of twins, a club dancer and a criminal, who are separated as children in Kudiyirundha Koyil (1968) garnered him the Tamil Nadu State Film Award for Best Actor. In 1969, he appeared as a prince who brings down a tyrant who usurps his throne and mistreats his people in K. Shankar's Adimai Penn, and as a government clerk who masquerades as a billionaire to defeat the corrupt trio of a doctor, a builder and a merchant in Nam Naadu. The former won him the Best Film at the Tamil Nadu State Film Awards.

Ramachandran began the 1970s with roles in such social dramas as Mattukkara Velan and Engal Thangam (both released in 1970), both of which enjoyed commercial success. The following year, he received the National Film Award for Best Actor for his role as a cycle rickshaw driver in Rickshawkaran, making it the first film and him the first actor from South Indian cinema to win the award. It went on to become the highest-grossing film of the year. He then directed and produced the science fiction film Ulagam Sutrum Valiban (1973) where he also starred in dual roles as brothers, a scientist and a CBI officer. It became his most commercially successful film to that point. Ramachandran retired from filmmaking in 1978 to take up his duties as the Chief Minister of Tamil Nadu; his last venture, entitled Madhuraiyai Meetta Sundharapandiyan, was a commercial failure.

== Films ==
- All films are in Tamil, unless otherwise noted.

| Year | Film | Role(s) | Notes | Ref(s) |
|---|---|---|---|---|
| 1936 | Sathi Leelavathi | Rangaiah Naidu | | |
| 1936 | Iru Sahodarargal | Masthaan | Credited as G. Ramachandran | |
| 1938 | Dakshayagnam | Vishnu | | |
| 1938 | Veera Jagathis | Baiyan | | |
| 1939 | Maya Machhindra | Sooryakethu | Credited as Ramachandar | |
| 1939 | Prahalada | Indra | | |
| 1941 | Vedavathi Alladhu Seetha Jananam | Indrajith | Credited as M. G. Ramachandar | |
| 1941 | Ashok Kumar | Mahendran | Credited as M. G. Ramachandar | |
| 1942 | Tamizhariyum Perumal | Santhanakumaran | Guest appearance | |
| 1943 | Dhaasippen | Shiva | The film had two alternative titles: Jyothi Malar and Thumbhai Mahatmyam | |
| 1944 | Harischandra | Sathyakeerthi | | |
| 1945 | Saalivaahanan | Vikramaditya | | |
| 1945 | Meera | Jayamal | | |
| 1946 | Sri Murugan | Shiva | | |
| 1947 | Rajakumari | Mohan | Credited as M. G. Ramachandar | |
| 1947 | Paithiyakkaran | Moorthy | Credited as M. G. R. | |
| 1948 | Abhimanyu | Arjuna | Credited as M. G. Ramachandar | |
| 1948 | Raja Mukthi | Mahendra Varman | | |
| 1948 | Mohini | Vijayakumar | Credited as M. G. Ramachandar | |
| 1949 | Ratnakumar | Baladevan | | |
| 1950 | Maruthanad Elavarasee | Kandeeban | Credited as M. G. Ramachandar | |
| 1950 | Manthiri Kumari | Veeramohan | Credited as M. G. Ramachandar | |
| 1951 | Marmayogi | Karikalan | Credited as M. G. Ramachandar; Simultaneously made in Hindi as Ek Tha Raja | |
| 1951 | Sarvadhikari | Prathapan | | |
| 1952 | Andhaman Kaidhi | Nataraj | | |
| 1952 | Kumari | Vijayan | | |
| 1952 | En Thangai | Rajendran | | |
| 1953 | Naam | Kumaran | Also producer | |
| 1953 | Panakkaari | Sundar | | |
| 1953 | Genova | Cipresso | Simultaneously shot in Malayalam | |
| 1954 | Malaikkallan | Kumaraveeran (Malaikkallan) (Abdul Rahim) (Note: M. G. Ramachandran played a single character in the film who has two or more different names.) | | |
| 1954 | Koondukkili | Thangaraj | | |
| 1955 | Gulebakavali | Dasan | | |
| 1956 | Alibabavum 40 Thirudargalum | Ali Baba | First full-length colour film of South India | |
| 1956 | Madurai Veeran | Madurai Veeran | | |
| 1956 | Thaikkupin Tharam | Muthaiyan | | |
| 1957 | Chakravarthi Thirumagal | Prince Udhayasuryan | | |
| 1957 | Raja Rajan | Rajan | | |
| 1957 | Pudhumai Pithan | Jeevagan | | |
| 1957 | Mahadevi | Vallavan | | |
| 1958 | Nadodi Mannan | Marthandan, Veerangan (Note: M. G. Ramachandran played dual roles in this film.) | Also director and producer | |
| 1959 | Thaai Magalukku Kattiya Thaali | Kanagu | | |
| 1960 | Baghdad Thirudan | Abu | | |
| 1960 | Raja Desingu | Tej Singh alias Desingu, Dawood Khan | | |
| 1960 | Mannathi Mannan | Manivannan | | |
| 1961 | Arasilankumari | Arivazhagan, Gunasekaran | | |
| 1961 | Thirudathe | Balu | | |
| 1961 | Sabaash Mapillai | Vasu | | |
| 1961 | Nallavan Vazhvan | Muthu | | |
| 1961 | Thai Sollai Thattathe | Raju | | |
| 1962 | Rani Samyuktha | Prithviraj Chauhan | | |
| 1962 | Madappura | Ramu | | |
| 1962 | Thayai Katha Thanayan | Sekar | | |
| 1962 | Kudumba Thalaivan | Vasu | | |
| 1962 | Paasam | Gopi | | |
| 1962 | Vikramaadhithan | Vikramaditya | | |
| 1963 | Panathottam | Selvam | | |
| 1963 | Koduthu Vaithaval | Selvam | | |
| 1963 | Dharmam Thalai Kaakkum | Chandran | | |
| 1963 | Kalai Arasi | Mohan, Alien | 'First Indian Film' to feature 'Aliens' | |
| 1963 | Periya Idathu Penn | Murugappan | | |
| 1963 | Anandha Jodhi | Anand | | |
| 1963 | Neethikkupin Paasam | Gopal | | |
| 1963 | Kaanchi Thalaivan | Narasimha Pallavan (Mamallan) | | |
| 1963 | Parisu | Venu | | |
| 1964 | Vettaikkaran | Babu | | |
| 1964 | En Kadamai | Inspector Nathan | | |
| 1964 | Panakkara Kudumbam | Nallathambi | | |
| 1964 | Deiva Thai | Maran | | |
| 1964 | Thozhilali | Raju | | |
| 1964 | Padagotti | Manickam | | |
| 1964 | Thayin Madiyil | Raja | | |
| 1965 | Enga Veettu Pillai | Ilango, Ramu | | |
| 1965 | Panam Padaithavan | Raja | | |
| 1965 | Aayirathil Oruvan | Manimaran | | |
| 1965 | Kalangarai Vilakkam | Ravi | | |
| 1965 | Kanni Thai | Saravanan | | |
| 1965 | Thazhampoo | Durai | | |
| 1965 | Aasai Mugam | Manohar, Vajravelu | | |
| 1966 | Anbe Vaa | J. B. (Balu) | | |
| 1966 | Naan Aanaiyittal | Pandiyan | | |
| 1966 | Muharasi | Ramu | | |
| 1966 | Nadodi | Thyagu | | |
| 1966 | Chandrodayam | Chandran | | |
| 1966 | Thaali Bhagyam | Murugan | | |
| 1966 | Thanippiravi | Muthaiah | | |
| 1966 | Parakkum Pavai | Jeeva | | |
| 1966 | Petralthan Pillaiya | Anandhan | | |
| 1967 | Thaikku Thalaimagan | Marudhu | | |
| 1967 | Arasa Kattalai | Vijayan | | |
| 1967 | Kaavalkaaran | Mani | | |
| 1967 | Vivasaayee | Muthaiah | | |
| 1968 | Ragasiya Police 115 | Ramu | | |
| 1968 | Ther Thiruvizha | Saravanan, Himself | | |
| 1968 | Kudiyirundha Koyil | Anand, Sekar (Babu) (Note: M. G. Ramachandran played dual roles in this film, one of who has two or more different names.) | Tamil Nadu State Film Award for Best Actor | |
| 1968 | Kannan En Kadhalan | Kannan | | |
| 1968 | Puthiya Bhoomi | Katheeravan | | |
| 1968 | Kanavan | Valaiyan | | |
| 1968 | Oli Vilakku | Muthu | 100th Film | |
| 1968 | Kadhal Vaaganam | Sundaram | | |
| 1969 | Adimai Penn | Vengaiya Malaiyan, Vengaiyyan | Also producer Tamil Nadu State Film Award for Best Film | |
| 1969 | Nam Naadu | Durai | | |
| 1970 | Mattukkara Velan | Velan, Raghu | | |
| 1970 | En Annan | Rangan | | |
| 1970 | Thalaivan | Ilango | | |
| 1970 | Thedi Vandha Mappillai | Shankar | | |
| 1970 | Engal Thangam | Thangam, Himself | | |
| 1971 | Kumari Kottam | Gopal | | |
| 1971 | Rickshawkaran | Selvam | National Film Award for Best Actor | |
| 1971 | Neerum Neruppum | Manivannan, Karikalan | | |
| 1971 | Oru Thai Makkal | Kannan | | |
| 1972 | Sange Muzhangu | Murugan | | |
| 1972 | Nalla Neram | Raju | | |
| 1972 | Raman Thediya Seethai | Raman | | |
| 1972 | Naan Yen Pirandhen | Kannan | | |
| 1972 | Annamitta Kai | Durairaj | | |
| 1972 | Idhaya Veenai | Sundaram | | |
| 1973 | Ulagam Sutrum Valiban | Raju, Murugan | Also director and producer | |
| 1973 | Pattikaattu Ponnaiya | Ponnaiah, Muthaiah | | |
| 1974 | Netru Indru Naalai | Rathnam (Manickam), Kumar | | |
| 1974 | Urimaikural | Gopi | | |
| 1974 | Sirithu Vazha Vendum | Ramu, Rahman | | |
| 1975 | Ninaithadhai Mudippavan | Sundaram, Ranjith Kumar | | |
| 1975 | Naalai Namadhe | Shankar, Vijay | | |
| 1975 | Idhayakkani | Mohan | | |
| 1975 | Pallandu Vaazhga | Rajan | | |
| 1976 | Needhikku Thalaivanangu | Vijay | | |
| 1976 | Uzhaikkum Karangal | Ranga | | |
| 1976 | Oorukku Uzhaippavan | Selvam, Kumar | | |
| 1977 | Navarathinam | Thangam | | |
| 1977 | Indru Pol Endrum Vaazhga | Murugan | | |
| 1977 | Meenava Nanban | Kumaran | | |
| 1978 | Madhuraiyai Meetta Sundharapandiyan | Sundarapandian | Also director | |
| 1990 | Avasara Police 100 | Raju | Posthumous release. Archive footage of Ramachandran's unfinished film Anna Nee En Deivam used. | |
| 1991 | Nallathai Naadu Kekum | Jeeva | Posthumous release. Archive footage of Ramachandran's unfinished film of the same name used. | |

== See also ==
- M. G. Ramachandran's unrealized projects

== Bibliography ==
- Joshi, Priya; Dudrah, Rajinder (16 May 2016). The 1970s and Its Legacies in India's Cinemas. New York City: Routledge. ISBN 978-0-415-83658-6.
- Kannan, R. (2010). Anna: The Life and Times of C.N. Annadurai. New Delhi: Penguin Books. ISBN 978-0-670-08328-2.
- Kannan, R. (2017). MGR: A Life. New Delhi: Penguin Books. ISBN 978-93-8649-588-4.
- Kasbekar, Asha (2006). Pop Culture India!: Media, Arts, and Lifestyle. Santa Barbara, California: ABC-CLIO. ISBN 978-1-85109-636-7.
- Rajadhyaksha, Ashish; Willemen, Paul (1998) [1994]. Encyclopaedia of Indian Cinema (PDF). New Delhi: Oxford University Press. ISBN 978-0-19-563579-9.
- Rajanayagam, S. (2015). Popular Cinema and Politics in South India: The Films of MGR and Rajinikanth. New Delhi: Routledge. ISBN 978-1-138-82203-0.
