= S. M. Subbaiah Naidu =

Indian composer, conductor, and orchestrator

- Born: Subburayulu Munuswami Subbaiah Naidu; 15 March 1914; Kadayanallur. Tinnevely district, Madras Presidency, British India (now in Tenkasi district, Tamil Nadu, India)
- Died: 26 May 1979 (aged 65)
- Other name: SMS
- Occupation: music composer
- Years active: 1942–1978

Subburayulu Munuswami Subbaiah Naidu (a.k.a. SMS) (15 March 1914, Kadayanallur, British India – 26 May 1979) was an Indian composer, conductor, and orchestrator. He was one of the oldest music directors. He worked as an in-house music composer for Central Studios and Pakshiraja Studios and well associated with S. M. Sriramulu Naidu. SMS also worked with many films under Jupiter Pictures banner and a favorite of M. G. Ramachandran.

== Early life ==
He was born on 15 March 1914 into a Balija family in Kadayanallur (now a Municipality in Tenkasi district, Tamil Nadu). Having had an unhappy childhood, he ran away from home with dreams of finding his fortune in Singapore, but ended up working in drama troupes such as those of Jagannatha Aiyer and Nawab Rajamanickam Pillai. Finding himself drawn more to music than acting, SMS learned music from masters such as Rajagopala Iyengar and Subramaniya Bagavathar. When the company's play Baktha Ramadas was made into a movie, SMS worked on the music for the movie as well.

== Career life ==
He is fondly known as "Sangeethayya" in the south Indian film industries. He is well versed in the Indian music but never showed interest in Western tunes and music.

SMS worked jointly with other composers on a few movies in the early 1940s. He then composed music for the first movie in which MGR played the hero Rajakumaari in 1947. All through the 1950s, SMS continued to compose memorable songs in the movies that came his way. Films such as Ezhai Padum Padu (1950), Kanchana (1952) and Malaikkallan (1954) helped him to consolidate his place among the front-ranking composers of the decade. There were also Thirumanam, Maragadham, Nadodi Mannan and the magnificent classic Konjum Salangai.

While he was composing music for Rajakumaari at Central Studious, SMS made the acquaintance of the hero MGR. This laid the basis for a lifelong friendship between the two, which was further strengthened during the making of Marma Yogi and Malaikkallan. When MGR turned producer and director with Nadodi Mannan, he invited SMS to compose the songs, along with N.S. Balakrishnan who had composed 2 songs. Later, when the fortunes of SMS were on the decline in the 1960s, MGR secured for his friend a few opportunities such as Thaayin Madiyil, Aasai Mugam and Thalaivan.

As the 1960s progressed, SMS engaged in a few projects towards the end of the 1960s such as Naam Moovar, Raja Veetu Pillai, Uyir Mel Aasai, Sabash Thambi, Panakkara Pillai, Naalum Therindhavan, Chakkaram and Mannippu.

In the 1970s, opportunities were few and far between Snegithi, Vairakiyam, Therottam and Thanga Gopuram.

In addition to being a composer, he was a conductor, and orchestrator. He is considered as O. P. Nayyar of South India. His tunes were catchy and his songs popular. He collaborated with J. P. Chandrababu on the song Kunguma Poove Konjum Puraave. The popular S. Janaki's Singaara Velane Deva was composed by him. He innovated the concept of voice with Nadaswaram.

He worked with singers like C. S. Jayaraman, T. M. Soundararajan, Ghantalasa, A. M. Rajah, Thiruchi Loganathan, Seerkazhi Govindarajan, V. N. Sundharam, T. A. Mothi, P. B. Sreenivas, S. C. Krishnan, A. L. Raghavan, M. L. Vasanthakumari, P. A. Periyanayaki, P. Leela, Jikki, P. Susheela, T. V. Rathnam, K. V. Janaki, A. P. Komala, K. Jamuna Rani, Radha Jayalakshmi, Soolamangalam Rajalakshmi, S. Janaki and L. R. Eswari.

The singing actors P. U. Chinnappa, C. Honnappa Bhagavathar, N. C. Vasanthakokilam, U. R. Jeevarathinam, T. R. Rajakumari, K. R. Ramasamy, V. Nagayya, N. S. Krishnan, T. A. Madhuram, P. Bhanumathi, S. Varalakshmi and J. P. Chandrababu also sang memorable songs under his compositions.

== Trivia ==
- In 1947, SMS was the first music composer in Tamil film industry who had introduced playback singing for Rajakumari. Thiruchi Loganathan sang "Kasinimel Nangal", a playback song for M. N. Nambiar. It is notable that it is MGR's first movie as a hero.
- In 1948 under SMS's composition, Kannadasan wrote his first song "Kalangathiru Manamey Un Kanavellan Nanavagum Oru Dinamey" for Kanniyin Kathali sung by K. V. Janaki. The film was released in 1949.
- His all-purpose assistant, M. S. Viswanathan at Jupiter Pictures later became the musician of Tamil films. As his assistant, M. S. Viswanathan practised composing tunes when SMS was not around. When MGR was the Chief Minister of Tamil Nadu, M. S. Viswanathan had organised a programme to honour his "master" SMS. SMS was a very close friend of MGR.
- He featured in a role as a doctor in Malaikkallan that won the National Film Award for Best Feature Film in Tamil.
- He had composed a few songs for Thirudadhe and was working on setting the tune for a duet when producer AL. Srinivasan made him listen to a song En Aruge Nee Irundhaal sung by P. B. Sreenivas & P. Susheela. The song had been composed by Viswanathan–Ramamoorthy for an earlier project and had remained unused. AL. Srinivasan suggested that the song be included in the movie. Seeing that it was by his protégé M. S. Viswanathan, SMS readily agreed, and thus the song featured with the credit once again going to SMS.
- M. S. Viswanathan and Kannadasan, who have acknowledged many a time the crucial role played by SMS in shaping their career, organized a grand function to celebrate the 60th birthday of the master composer. In the function graced by MGR and Sivaji Ganesan, a cash award was presented to SMS as a token of his contribution to Tamil cinema.
- M. S. Viswanathan brought the childless SMS and his wife to his house and attended to their every need with solicitude until each of their end.

== Works ==
Some compositions of S. M. Subbaiah Naidu, include

- Thirudaathe Paappaa from Thirudadhe by T. M. Soundararajan
- Yauvanamae Aahaa Yauvanamae by M. L. Vasanthakumari from Ezhai Padum Padu
- O Kiliye Aasai Kiliye by P. A. Periyanayaki from Ezhai Padum Padu
- Ethanai Kaalanthaan from Malaikkallan by T. M. Soundararajan
- Thoongaathe Thambi from Nadodi Mannan by T. M. Soundararajan
- Singaara Velane Deva from Konjum Salangai by S. Janaki
- Nee Engey En Ninaivugalangey from Mannippu by T. M. Soundararajan
- Kuyilosayai Vellum form Mannippu by P. Suseela & A. P. Komala
- Maalai Mayangukindra Neram from Maragadham by Radha Jayalakshmi
- Kannukkulle Unnai Paaru from Maragadham by T. M. Soundararajan & Radha Jayalakshmi
- Annaiyai Pol Oru Dheivamillai from Annaiyin Aanai by T. M. Soundararajan
- Kanavin Maya Logathile from Annaiyin Aanai by T. M. Soundararajan & P. Suseela
- Ethanai Selvangal Vandhaalume from Thaayin Madiyil by T. M. Soundararajan
- Sabash Thambi Un kolgaiyai Potrukiren from Sabash Thambi by T. M. Soundararajan
- Kannil Vanthu Minnal Pol from Nadodi Mannan by T. M. Soundararajan & Jikki
- Ina Mina Dika from Athisaya Penn by P. Suseela
- Neeya Illai Naana from Aasai Mugam by T. M. Soundararajan & P. Suseela

== Filmography ==
Year	Film	Language	Director	Banner	Co-Music Directors
1946	Sri Murugan	Tamil	M. Somasundaram	Jupiter Pictures	S. V. Venkatraman
1947	Kundalakesi	Tamil	Bomman D. Irani	K. S. S. Pictures	G. Ramanathan
1947	Rajakumari	Tamil	A. S. A. Sami	Jupiter Pictures	
1947	Kanjan	Tamil	Kovai C. Aiyamuthu & T. R. Gopu	Jupiter Pictures	
1948	Abhimanyu	Tamil	M. Somasundaram & A. Kasilingam	Jupiter Pictures	C. R. Subburaman
1948	Mohini	Tamil	Lanka Sathiyam	Jupiter Pictures	C. R. Subburaman
1949	Velaikaari	Tamil	A. S. A. Sami	Jupiter Pictures	C. R. Subburaman
1949	Kanniyin Kaadhali	Tamil	K. Ramnoth	Jupiter Pictures	C. R. Subburaman
1950	Krishna Vijayam	Tamil	M. Somasundaram	Jupiter Pictures	C. S. Jayaraman
1950	Digambara Samiyar	Tamil	T. R. Sundaram	Modern Theatres	G. Ramanathan
1950	Ezhai Padum Padu	Tamil	S. M. Sriramulu Naidu	Pakshiraja Studios	
1950	Beedala Paatlu	Telugu	S. M. Sriramulu Naidu	Pakshiraja Studios	G. Aswathama
1951	Marma Yogi	Tamil	K. Ramnoth	Jupiter Pictures	C. R. Subburaman
1951	Rakthabandham	Malayalam	M. R. Vittal		S. N. Ranganathan
1952	Kanchana	Tamil	S. M. Sriramulu Naidu	Pakshiraja Studios	
1952	Kanchana	Telugu	S. M. Sriramulu Naidu	Pakshiraja Studios	
1952	Kanchana	Malayalam	S. M. Sriramulu Naidu	Pakshiraja Studios	
1953	Ponni	Tamil	S. M. Sriramulu Naidu	Pakshiraja Studios	
1953	Oka Thalli Pillalu	Telugu	S. M. Sriramulu Naidu	Pakshiraja Studios	
1954	Malaikkallan	Tamil	S. M. Sriramulu Naidu	Pakshiraja Studios	
1954	Aggi Ramudu	Telugu	S. M. Sriramulu Naidu	Pakshiraja Studios	
1956	Vaazhvile Oru Naal	Tamil	A. Kasilingam	Mercury Films	C. N. Pandurangan & T. G. Lingappa
1957	Bettada Kalla	Kannada	S. M. Sriramulu Naidu	Pakshiraja Studios	
1957	Surasena	Sinhala	S. M. Sriramulu Naidu	Pakshiraja Studios	
1957	Taskaraveeran	Malayalam	S. M. Sriramulu Naidu	Pakshiraja Studios	C. Ramchandra
1958	Aalai Kandu Mayangathe	Tamil			
1958	Annaiyin Aanai	Tamil	Ch. Narayana Murthy	Paragon Pictures	
1958	Nadodi Mannan	Tamil	M. G. Ramachandran	Emgeeyar Pictures	N. S. Balakrishnan
1958	Thirumanam	Tamil	A. Bhim Singh	Valampuri Pictures Limited	T. G. Lingappa
1959	Athisaya Penn	Tamil	M. V. Raman	Raman Productions	
1959	Maragadham	Tamil	S. M. Sriramulu Naidu	Pakshiraja Studios	
1959	Nalla Theerpu	Tamil	T. Prakash Rao	Sri Productions	
1960	Manasichina Maguva	Telugu	A. Bhim Singh	Valampuri Pictures Limited	
1960	Vimala	Tamil	S. M. Sriramulu Naidu	Pakshiraja Studios	
1961	Thalli Ichina Agnya	Telugu	Ch. Narayana Murthy	Paragon Pictures	
1961	Thirudadhe	Tamil	P. Neelakantan	A.L.S. Productions	
1961	Sabarimala Ayyappan	Malayalam	S. M. Sriramulu Naidu	Pakshiraja Studios	
1961	Sabarimala Ayyappan	Tamil	S. M. Sriramulu Naidu	Pakshiraja Studios	
1962	Konjum Salangai	Tamil	M. V. Raman	Raman Productions	
1962	Muripinche Muvvalu	Telugu	M. V. Raman	Raman Productions	
1963	Aayiram Kalathu Payir	Tamil	T. S. Durairaj	T.S.D. Pictures	
1963	Kalyaniyin Kanavan	Tamil	S. M. Sriramulu Naidu	Pakshiraja Studios	
1963	Thalli Koduku	Telugu	T. Prakash Rao	Shree Productions	
1964	Thaayin Madiyil	Tamil	Adurthi Subba Rao	Annai Films	
1965	Aasai Mugam	Tamil	P. Pullaiah	Mohan Productions	
1966	Naam Moovar	Tamil	C. P. Jambulingham	Balan Pictures	
1967	Pandhayam	Tamil	A. Kasilingam	M. K. Movies	
1967	Mugguru Mithrulu	Telugu	C. P. Jambulingham	Balan Pictures	Baburao
1967	Raja Veetu Pillai	Tamil	Dada Mirasi	Mohan Productions	
1967	Sabash Thambi	Tamil	C. P. Jambulingham	Balan Pictures	
1967	Sundaramurthi Nayanar	Tamil	K. Somu	Kandhasami Productions	
1967	Uyir Mel Aasai	Tamil	C. P. Jambulingham	Ayappan Productions	
1968	Chakkaram	Tamil	A. Kasilingam	Annai Films	
1968	Debbaku Debba	Telugu	P. Pullaiah	Mohan Productions	
1968	Muthu Chippi	Tamil	M. Krishnan	Mohan Productions	
1968	Naalum Therindhavan	Tamil	C. P. Jambulingham	Sri Balajee Combines	
1968	Panakkara Pillai	Tamil	C. P. Jambulingham	Annai Films	
1968	Poolapilla	Telugu	Dada Mirasi	Mohan Productions	Rajaram
1969	Aindhu Laksham	Tamil	G. Ramakrishnan	Sudha Movies	
1969	Mannippu	Tamil	M. Krishnan	Mohan Productions	
1969	Pennai Vazha Vidungal	Tamil	R. Devarajan	Vijaya Chithra Films	
1970	Thalaivan	Tamil	P. A. Thomas & Singhu Muthu	Thomas Pictures	
1970	Snegithi	Tamil	G. Ramakrishnan	Sudha Movies	
1970	Vairakiyam	Tamil	A. Kasilingam	Annai Films	
1971	Gudachari 003	Telugu	C. P. Jambulingham	Balan Pictures	Pamarthi
1971	Ilangeswaran	Tamil	V. T. Arasu	Shasti Films	
1971	Thanga Gopuram	Tamil	M. S. Solaimalai	Mohan Pictures	
1971	Therottam	Tamil	V. T. Arasu	Shasti Films	
1972	Bathilukku Bathil	Tamil	C. P. Jambulingham	Balan Combines	
1972	Jakkamma	Tamil	M. Karnan	Vijaya Chitra Films	
1974	Monagallu Mosagallu	Telugu	M. Karnan	Vijaya Chitra Films	
1975	Hotel Sorgam	Tamil	G. Ramakrishnan	Sudha Movies	
1976	Kula Gouravam	Tamil	Peketi Sivaram	Balan Movies	
1978	Kaviraja Kalamegam	Tamil	G. R. Nathan	T.N.R. Productions	
