= Sachi Sri Kantha =

Japanese academic (born 1953)

- Born: Sachithanantham Sri Kantha; 8 May 1953 (age 73); Chilaw, Sri Lanka
- Citizenship: Sri Lankan (1953-2016), Japanese (2016-present)
- Education: University of Colombo, (Sri Lanka); University of Peradeniya, (Sri Lanka); University of Illinois at Urbana–Champaign; University of Tokyo
- Occupations: Inter-disciplinary biologist, author
- Known for: 'Kilo Base Goliaths' (KBG)
- Spouse: Saki Sri Kantha
- Children: 2
- Scientific career
- Fields: Primatology, history of science, science education, humor studies
- Workplaces: University of Peradeniya, (Sri Lanka); Gifu Pharmaceutical University, (Japan); Gifu University, (Japan)
- Thesis: Nutritional Studies on the utilization of winged bean Psophocarpus tetragonolobus L.DC seeds and leaves
- Doctoral advisor: John W. Erdman Jr

Sachithanantham Sri Kantha (born 8 May 1953) is a Sri Lanka-born scientist, historian and bilingual author who mainly focuses on science writing for the general public. Among his books are Prostitutes in Medical Literature: An Annotated Bibliography and An Einstein Dictionary. He has been residing in Japan since 1986, and became a naturalised Japanese citizen in 2016.

== Education ==
A native of Point Pedro, Sri Lanka, Sachi Sri Kantha received his early education in 1960s at the Colombo Hindu College (Bambalapitiya and Ratmalana) and at the Aquinas University College, Colombo. In 1972, he entered University of Colombo and graduated in zoology in 1976. During his undergraduate days, he was active in Tamil student drama circle, and held the presidency of University of Colombo Tamil Society during 1974–75, when it celebrated its Golden Jubilee. Subsequently, he earned his master's degree in biochemistry from University of Peradeniya (1980). While at this university, Sri Kantha also actively engaged students in Tamil dramas by directing a few in cultural festivals. For doctoral studies, Sri Kantha left for USA in 1981 and earned his first Ph.D. in Food Chemistry from University of Illinois, Urbana Champaign (1986). Then, he moved to Japan as a Monbusho scholar at the University of Tokyo during 1986–88 and was awarded a second Ph.D. in Marine Biochemistry in 1989.

== Career ==
During his second post-doctoral stint (1989–90) at the then Medical College of Pennsylvania, Philadelphia, Sri Kantha collected material for his first reference book. Prostitutes in Medical Literature: an annotated bibliography (1991). David Friedrichs, reviewing this work for the American Reference Books Annual 1992, indicated, "Currently, of course, there is intense concern with prostitution as a source for the transmission of AIDS. Accordingly, the extensive list of relevant items will be exceptionally useful to researchers." Vern Bullough and Lilli Sentz annotated this book as, "Is somewhat broader than the title indicates and includes general and history, anthropology, sociology, psychology and mental health. Particularly good on sexually transmitted diseases."
After moving to Japan in 1991 to join the group of Osamu Hayaishi (1991–94) at the Osaka Bioscience Institute, Sri Kantha worked on his second reference book, An Einstein Dictionary (1996). This work received mixed reviews. While George Eberhart recommended ‘this volume is useful as a quick fact-finder’ and Laurie Brown found it ‘more interesting reading, because of its colorful entries and extensive bibliography and index’, C.D. Hurt criticized it for ‘inequalities in the typeface fonts between the main text and disconcerting tables’ Since 2000, Sri Kantha joined the academia as an associate professor at the Gifu University and had continued his career as visiting professor at the Kyoto University Primate Research Institute (2002–05) and Gifu Pharmaceutical University (2006–10). He returned to the Center for General Education, Gifu University, again as an associate professor, from 2010 to 2016, and continued as a visiting professor at the United Graduate School of Agricultural Sciences (UGSAS), Gifu University, teaching science paper writing and researcher ethics for graduate students, until 2018. In 2000, he received recognition in the reference work Contemporary Authors series. Since 2020, Sri Kantha has an affiliation as adjunct visiting professor at the Graduate School of Medicine, Nagoya City University, Japan.

== Scientific contributions ==
In 1991, Sri Kantha wrote a paper on the nomination nepotism in the awarding of Nobel prizes, claiming that many prizes given between 1901 and 1937 were not based solely on merit but rather were motivated by preference in the German research community.

In 1992, Sri Kantha published a paper on the prolific productivity of eight prominent scientists, among whom three (Paul Karrer, Giulio Natta and Herbert C. Brown) were chemistry Nobel laureates. As these scientists have published over 1,000 research publications, he gave a humorous tag Kilo Base Goliaths (KBGs) for these super achievers in the laboratory. While commenting on this paper, Marsh Tenney added that among physiologists, Swiss physiologist Albrecht von Haller (1708-1777) should hold the record for writing some 13,000 scientific papers, but I suspect that number more correctly includes his poems and other short pieces that were not scientific. Nonetheless, after they are properly accounted, the record is still astonishing. Recently John Ioannidis and his colleagues had proposed an almost identical phrase ‘hyper-prolific authors’ for the same group of super achievers, identified as ‘Kilo Base Goliaths’, by Sri Kantha in 1992.

In 1996, Sri Kantha proposed a new term ‘galactic organism with distinct intelligence’ (GODI), for extraterrestrial forms, with which humans can make contact. This is because, among the other two popular acronyms, unidentified flying object (UFO) projects a sense of mysticism and extraterrestrials (ET) do not distinguish clearly distinguish microorganisms without intelligence and intelligent human-like life forms. He also identified that the bottleneck factor in inter-stellar travel by humans was the current rocket velocity of 28,000 km/h. This needs to be increased 3,600 fold to reach the one-tenth speed of light for inter-stellar travel.

Sri Kantha also published a novel hypothesis on the premature death of chemist-inventor and philanthropist Alfred Nobel (1833-1896) in 1997. Commenting on this hypothesis, K.M. Reese wrote, ‘Kantha bases his hypothesis in part on the memoirs of Ragnar Sohlman, Nobel’s personal assistant during the last three years of his life. He also drew on Nobel’s letters and recent knowledge of nitroglycerine poisoning.

After studying a cluster of 35 centenarian scientists, Sri Kantha proposed in 2001 that such centenarian scientists are an unusual cluster first formed in the 20th century. When K.M. Reese annotated the Lancet letter of Sri Kantha in his weekly column to the Chemical and Engineering News, many American readers contributed the names of chemists and inventors who did become centenarians in the 20th century. Furthermore, in 2003, while being affiliated to the Primate Research Center of Kyoto University, Sri Kantha posed a somewhat controversial query, ‘Is somnambulism a distinct disorder of humans and not seen in non-human primates?’ Answer to this question still eludes primatologists, geneticists and medical researchers.

In 2016, Sri Kantha proposed a four-fold classification on love bites or monkey bites based on trauma grade. These are, type 1 (consensual sex play), type 2 (consensual sex play sliding into sexual aggression), type 3 (sexual aggression of hetero variety) and type 4 (self biting of auto variety). While type 1 is the most discussed occurrence among willing partners, other three types may become serious and need medical attention.

Influenced by the scientometric contributions of Eugene Garfield, Sri Kantha had also published on the scientific productivity and unusual creativity of some elite scientists including Alfred Nobel, Albert Einstein, Karl Landsteiner, Sigmund Freud, Bertrand Russell, Francis Crick, James Watson, William Masters, Alex Comfort, and Wardell Pomeroy. Sri Kantha had also studied the little known facets on medical themes from the works of Shakespeare, Gogol, Mahatma Gandhi, Ryunosuke Akutagawa, and Junichiro Tanizaki.

== Work as a biographer ==
In 2005, Sri Kantha published his 640-page biography book on Velupillai Prabhakaran (1954-2009), the leader of Liberation Tigers of Tamil Eelam (LTTE). It was entitled, ‘Pirabhakaran Phenomenon’. According to him, ‘Though the book is entitled as ‘Pirabhakaran Phenomenon’, what I have attempted was also a recent history of Eelam Tamils since 1975.’ For his advocacy of the Eelam state, Sri Kantha had received a derisive sobriquet ‘A Tangential Tamil sniper’ from Sri Lankan historian Michael Roberts For this dubious honor, Sri Kantha’s response was published in the Ilankai Tamil Sangam site.

Since December 2012, Sri Kantha is currently serializing a biography on M. G. Ramachandran (aka MGR, 1917-1987), the renowned Indian actor and Tamil Nadu chief minister, in a Tamil ethnic community website. Among all the biographies published on MGR in either Tamil or English so far, this biography offers committed attention and analysis of MGR’s filmography (1936-1978) of four decades.

== Books by Sri Kantha ==
- Prostitutes in Medical Literature: An Annotated Bibliography, Bibliographies and Indexes in Medical Studies, No.6, Greenwood Press, Westport, Connecticut, 1991, 256 pp. ISBN 0-313-27491-6
- An Einstein Dictionary, Greenwood Press, Westport, Connecticut, 1996, 298 pp. ISBN 0-313-28350-8
- Atlas of Neuroactive Substances and Their Receptors in the Rat, edited by Masaya Tohyama and Koichi Takatsuji, Oxford University Press, Oxford, 1998, 337 pp. ISBN 9780198523727. (translator from Japanese to English)
- Tears and Cheers: Tale of a Tamil Scientist, vol. 1 (1953-1985), Bose Design, London, 2004, 199 pp, ISBN 0-9546853-0-X.
- Pirabhakaran Phenomenon, Lively Comet Imprint, Gifu City, Japan. 2005, 641 pp, ISBN 1-57087-671-1.

== Books referring to Sri Kantha ==
- Bullough, Vern L and Lilli Sentz (Ed). Prostitution – A Guide to Sources, 1960-1990, Garland Publishing Inc., New York, 1992. ISBN 0-8240-7101-8.
- Calaprice, Alice (Ed). The New Quotable Einstein, Princeton University Press, Princeton, 2005. ISBN 0-691-12075-7.
- Dobson, Roger. Death Can be Cured and 99 Other Medical Hypotheses, Cyan Communications Ltd, London, 2007. ISBN 978-1-905736-31-7.
- Kabdebo, Thomas and Neil Armstrong. Dictionary of Dictionaries and Eminent Encyclopedias, Bowker-Saur, West Sussex, 2nd ed, 1997.
- Rappoport, Leon. Punchlines: The Case for Racial, Ethnic and Gender Humor, Praeger Publishers, Westport, Connecticut, 2005. ISBN 0-275-98764-7.
- Sugimoto, Kenji. Dai Tsui Seki-Einstein No Tensai No 大追跡‼ アインシュタインの天才脳, Kodansha Sophia Books, Tokyo, 2001. ISBN 4-06-269128-0. (in Japanese).
- Boutheina Boughnim Laarif. W.H.Auden's ‘The Healing Fountain’ read through A.Aviram's Theory of Poetic Rhythm, Cambridge Scholars Publishing, Newcastleupon Tyne, UK, 2017. ISBN 1-5275-0330-5.
- Colin Beckley and Ute Bonillas. The Evolution of Diversity, Think Logically Books, 2017. ISBN 9780993193323.
- Bengt Ljunggren and George W. Bruyn. The Nobel Prize in Medicine and the Karolinska Institute - The Story of Axel Key and Alfred Nobel, Karger, Basel 2002. ISBN 3-8055-7297-2.
- R. Kannan. MGR - A Life, Penguin Random House India Ltd, Gurgaon, 2017, ISBN 9780143429340.
