= K. R. Ramsingh =

Indian theatre, film and voice actor

- Born: c. 1915; Nagercoil, Travancore, British India
- Died: 18 October 1985 (aged 70); Madras, Tamil Nadu, India
- Years active: 1947-1980
- Spouse: Lakshmi
- Children: 3

K. R. Ramsingh (c. 1915 – 18 October 1985) was an Indian theatre, film and voice actor.

== Early life ==
Ramsingh was born into a Rajput family in Nagercoil, Travancore (present day Kanyakumari district of Tamil Nadu). He was educated at the Hindu Higher Secondary School, Nagercoil. At a very young age, he was drawn towards theatre. Since his parents were not supportive of his decision, he had to leave his family and join an amateur drama company. After working for some companies, he joined the "Sri Ramabala Gaana Vinoda Sabha", a theatre group which consisted of future artists including M. S. Viswanathan and R. Muthuraman. During this time, Ramsingh won acclaim for acting in a play called Puyalukkuppin – he performed the role of a dictator. Later, he acted in a devotional play based on the life of the Vaishnava sage Thirumazhisai Aazhwar. It was staged in Madras for over 400 days. After establishing himself as a leading theatre artist, he got offers to act in films. He played the lead role as saint Vishwamitra in the 1948 Tamil film Brahmarishi Vishwamithra. He was paired opposite T. R. Rajakumari, who played the role of Menaka. The dialogues of the film were written by playwright Pammal Sambandha Mudaliar. The film was also released in Hindi with Ramsingh reprising his role. However, the film's failure prompted Ramsingh to go back to theatre.

== Film career ==
After a brief hiatus, he returned to films through Minnal Veeran starring Ranjan and Sandhya in the lead. Ramsingh played the main antagonist in the film. Following that, he went on to act in similar roles in films such as Puyal and Kanniyin Kaadhali. His role as an amputated wizard in K. Ramnath's Vijayakumari (1950) fetched him critical acclaim. Ramsingh was next seen in M. G. Ramachandran's Nadodi Mannan, where he played Bhanumathi Ramakrishna's father, Mahadevi, and Marutha Nattu Veeran.

While acting in films, he worked as a voice actor for films dubbed from other languages in Tamil. He provided the voice-over for Prithviraj Kapoor in a Hindi film. Kapoor was so impressed with Ramsingh's voice so that he requested the latter to do the voice-over for him in the Tamil version of Mughal-e-Azam. In the later part of his career, he worked mainly as a voice actor while making appearances in a few films.

== Death ==
Ramsingh died at the age of 70 on 18 October 1985 at a private hospital in Kodambakkam, Madras.

== Filmography ==
Year	Film	Role	Notes
1947	Brahmarishi Vishwamithra		Debut as Hero and Bilingual Film made in Tamil and Hindi
1949	Kanniyin Kathali	Durjayan	
1950	Vijayakumari	amputated Wizard	
1952	Puyal		
1957	Mahadhevi		
1958	Nadodi Mannan	Veerabahu	
1959	Minnal Veeran		
1961	Marutha Nattu Veeran		
1961	Naaga Nandhini		
1965	Thazhampoo	Murugan	
1965	Aasai Mugam	Plastic surgeon	
1967	Arasa Kattalai		
1969	Anjal Petti 520		
1973	Baghdad Perazhagi		
1976	Thunive Thunai	Bullock cart driver	
1980	Oru Velladu Vengaiyagiradhu		

== Awards and honours ==
Ramsingh was awarded the Kalaimamani award for his contributions to arts.
