= Jawab (1970 film) =

- Theatrical release poster
- Directed by: Ramanna
- Written by: Rajendra Krishan (dialogues)
- Story by: Sakthi T. K. Krishnasamy
- Based on: Periya Idathu Penn (1963)
- Produced by: K.G. Vijayarangam
- Starring: Jeetendra; Leena Chandavarkar; Ashok Kumar; Meena Kumari
- Cinematography: M.A. Rehman
- Edited by: M.S. Mani
- Music by: Laxmikant Pyarelal
- Production company: R.R. Pictures
- Release date: 15 July 1970
- Running time: 134 minutes
- Country: India
- Language: Hindi

Jawab (transl. Answer) is a 1970 Hindi-language drama film, produced by K.G. Vijayarangam, directed by Ramanna under the authority of R.R. Pictures. The film stars Jeetendra, Leena Chandavarkar, Ashok Kumar, and Meena Kumari. The music was composed by Laxmikant Pyarelal. The film is a remake of the Tamil movie Periya Idathu Penn (1963), with M.G.R and B. Saroja Devi, which was first remade as the Telugu movie Sabhash Suri (1964), starring N.T. Rama Rao and Krishna Kumari.

== Cast ==
- Ashok Kumar as Zamindar Uma Shankar
- Meena Kumari as Vidya (Raja's Elder Sister)
- Jeetendra as Raja / Rajkumar
- Leena Chandavarkar as Chanchal (Zamindars Daughter)
- Jyothi Lakshmi as Neela
- Prem Chopra as Sagar (Zamindars Son)
- Aruna Irani as Leela
- Mehmood as Bajrang
- Leela Mishra as Raja's Neighbour
- Ulhas as Shambhu (Neela and Leela's Father)

== Soundtrack ==
#	Song	Singer
1	"Aaja Meri Jaan Yeh Hai June Ka Mahina"	Kishore Kumar, Asha Bhosle
2	"Tanhai Mein Dil Ghabraye"	Lata Mangeshkar
3	"Zindagi Woh Kya, Na Pyar Jis Mein Ho"	Lata Mangeshkar, Mohammed Rafi
4	"Kis Karan Jogan Jog Liya"	Mohammed Rafi
5	"Chali Kahan Hansti Gaati Chanchal Nadiya"	Asha Bhosle, Mohammed Rafi, Hemlata
6	"Arey Amma, Wohi Mua Dekho"	Asha Bhosle, Usha Mangeshkar
