= Annaiyin Aanai =

1958 film by Ch. Narayana Murthy

- Theatrical release poster
- Directed by: Ch. Narayana Murthy
- Written by: Murasoli Maran (dialogues)
- Story by: Ch. Narayana Murthy
- Produced by: A. M. M. Issmayil
- Starring: Sivaji Ganesan; Savitri
- Cinematography: J. G. Vijayam
- Edited by: M. A. Perumal
- Music by: S. M. Subbaiah Naidu
- Production company: Paragon Pictures
- Distributed by: Subbu
- Release date: 4 July 1958
- Country: India
- Language: Tamil

Annaiyin Aanai (transl. Mother's order) is a 1958 Indian Tamil-language film directed by Ch. Narayana Murthy, starring Sivaji Ganesan and Savitri. The film was released on 4 July 1958, and won the National Film Award for Best Feature Film in Tamil.

== Cast ==
- Sivaji Ganesan as Shankar and Ganesh (dual role)
- Savitri as Prema
- M. N. Nambiar as Balu
- S. V. Ranga Rao as Parobakaram
- V. R. Rajagopal as Sundari's brother
- M. R. Santhanam as Karunakaran
- O. A. K. Thevar as Public prosecutor
- K. V. Srinivasan as the Buddhist monk
- M. N. Rajam as Sundari
- M. Pandari Bai as Gowri
- T. P. Muthulakshmi as Ganesh's servant

== Production ==
Annaiyin Aanai was produced by A. M. M. Issmayil under Paragon Pictures. Ch. Narayana Murthy directed the film besides writing the story and screenplay, while Murasoli Maran wrote the dialogues. C. Raghavan was the art director, M. A. Perumal was the editor, B. Hiralal was the choreographer, and J. G. Vijayam was the cinematographer. One scene in the film required Savitri's character to become emotional, grab Ganesan's character by the shirt and shake him excessively. Savitri tore Ganesan's shirt and clawed his chest, resulting in him bleeding heavily. Afterwards when he pretended to hit her with a towel, she controlled her emotions and stopped.

== Soundtrack ==
The music composed by S. M. Subbaiah Naidu. The song "Neeyegadhi Eswari" is set in Charukesi raga.

Song	Singers	Lyrics	Length
"Patthu Maadham Sumandhu...Annaiyai Pol Oru"	T. M. Soundararajan	Ka. Mu. Sheriff	04:16
"Kanavin Maayaa Logathile"	T. M. Soundararajan & P. Susheela	Ku. Ma. Balasubramaniam	03:30
"Neeyegadhi Eswari"	P. Leela	A. Maruthakasi	03:08
"Kollaadhe Idhupole Pollaadha Ulagame"	C. S. Jayaraman & A. P. Komala	A. Maruthakasi	03:20
"Enna Saami Ennai appadi Paarkire"	A. G. Rathnamala, Seergazhi Govindarajan & S. C. Krishnan	A. Maruthakasi	
"Puriyadha Inbam Ariyaadha Pudhumai"	P. Susheela	Va. Somanathan	03:30
"Samrat Ashokan" (Drama)	Sivaji Ganesan, M. N. Nambiar	Murasoli Maran	08:42
"Thandhaana Thaana Thaanaa.... Senthaazham Poo"	Jikki & A. G. Rathnamala	K. S. Gopalakrishnan	04:28
"Vaanga Vaanga Maappile"	P. Leela & P. Susheela	A. Maruthakasi	03:29
