= Sabash Thambi =

- Theatrical release poster
- Directed by: C. P. Jambulingam
- Screenplay by: Mullai Sakthi
- Story by: Mahendran
- Produced by: K. R. Balan
- Starring: Jaishankar; L. Vijayalakshmi
- Cinematography: M. Karnan
- Edited by: M. P. Siva Prakash
- Music by: S. M. Subbaiah Naidu
- Production company: Balan Pictures
- Distributed by: Sri Vinayaka Movies
- Release date: 10 February 1967
- Running time: 177 minutes
- Country: India
- Language: Tamil

Sabash Thambi (transl. Bravo, my brother) is a 1967 Indian Tamil-language spy thriller film, directed by C. P. Jambulingam and produced by K. R. Balan. The music was by S. M. Subbaiah Naidu. The film stars Jaishankar and L. Vijayalakshmi. It was released on 10 February 1967.

== Plot ==
Ramesh dies in an accident. Everyone suspects that he has committed suicide. But Sekar claims he was murdered and is now on a mission to find the culprits using his wits and instinct. He solves the mystery of Ramesh's death.

== Cast ==
- Jaishankar as Sekhar
- L. Vijayalakshmi as Shanthi
- S. A. Ashokan as Ramesh
- Rathna as Ratna
- Nagesh as JB
- Thengai Srinivasan as Muthu
- Pandari Bai as Sarada
- O. A. K. Thevar as Jagadish
- Master Rajkumar as Babu
- M. R. R. Vasu as Vasu
- Suryakala as JB's assistant

== Soundtrack ==
Music was composed by S. M. Subbaiah Naidu and lyrics were written by Vaali.

Song	Singer	Length
"Nenjam Oru Panju" (Puthusu Idhu)	T. M. Soundararajan P. Susheela	05:22
"Oi Mama Ungal"	L. R. Eswari & Sadhan	04:18
"Polish Boot Polish"	P. Susheela	03:15
"Aambala Singame" (Aiyaadio Aiyaadio)	S. C. Krishnan, L. R. Eswari & Chorus	05:10
"Sabash Thambi Unseigayai"	T. M. Soundararajan	03:19

== Reception ==
Kalki noted that the film did not have enough scope for Jaishankar to show his heroism and called the story old-fashioned, but appreciated Rajkumar's performance.

== Bibliography ==
- Cowie, Peter; Elley, Derek, eds. (1977). World Filmography: 1967. Fairleigh Dickinson University Press. ISBN 0-498-01565-3.
- Mahendran (2013) [2004]. சினிமாவும் நானும் [Cinema and I] (in Tamil). Karpagam Publications. OCLC 54777094.
