= Konjum Salangai =

- Theatrical release poster
- Directed by: M. V. Raman
- Produced by: M. V. Raman
- Dialogue by: Ku. Ma. Balasubramaniam
- Starring: Gemini Ganesan; Savitri; R. S. Manohar; Kumari Kamala
- Cinematography: S. Harpeet; Art Direction: M. Azhagappan
- Edited by: R. Bhaskaran; S. Muthu
- Music by: S. M. Subbaiah Naidu; Audiography: E. I. Jeeva
- Production company: Devi Films
- Distributed by: Devi Films
- Release date: 14 January 1962
- Running time: 180 minutes
- Country: India
- Language: Tamil
- Budget: ₹4 million

Konjum Salangai (transl. Enticing Anklets) is a 1962 Indian Tamil-language musical dance film directed by M. V. Raman. The film stars Gemini Ganesan, Savitri, R. S. Manohar and Kumari Kamala. It was released on 14 January 1962. The film was dubbed into Telugu as Muripinche Muvvalu. This is the Indian Tamil cinema's only film to be entirely shot and released in Technicolor.

== Plot ==
King Parthiban presents a rare anklet (salangai) to the dancer Aparajita, a gesture that angers those who resent a dancer’s influence over the kingdom. Aparajita later gives birth to the king’s son, Amarendran, and entrusts him to a priest along with the anklet. Before her death, she secures a promise from the priest that the truth about the child’s identity will be revealed at the right time.

Amarendran grows up to be a strong and talented young man with a passion for music, dance, and martial arts. During a grand festival, the priest decides it is time to disclose Amarendran’s true heritage and carries the anklet in a wooden box. While crossing a flooded river, however, he loses it. The anklet is recovered by Amarendran, who also rescues a dancer named Mallika from the floodwaters. Amarendran returns the anklet to the king and later meets the singer Shantha, who falls in love with him.

Mallika impresses the king, is subsequently appointed the court dancer and gets the anklet as a gift. In another dance competition, Mallika dances with Kamavalli (Kushalakumari) and the anklet gets stolen due to a conspiracy. The villain Nagadevan lusts after Mallika. How Amarendran and Mallika are united forms the rest of the story.

== Cast ==
Credits adapted from the film's songbook:

- Gemini Ganesan as Amarendran
- Savithri as Shantha
- Manohar as Nagadevan
- Kumari Kamala as Mallika
- Kusalakumari as Kamavalli
- S. Peer Mohamed as Panchanatham
- S. V. Ramdas as Parthiban
- K. Sarangapani as Nandhi
- C. P. Kittan as Kalamegam
- Rushyendramani as Shantha's Mother
- T. P. Muthulakshmi as Alankaram
- P. S. Gnanam as Mallika's Mother
- V. P. S. Mani as Mari
- Kumari Madhuri as Aparajitha
- V. Seetharaman as Mama
- Rathnam as Anjalai

Supporting cast

- T. V. Sethuraman, Gemini Balu, Socrates Thangaraj, Kumari Sasi, Stunt Raji, K. S. Manian

== Production ==
Konjum Salangai was the 100th film for Savitri as an actress. It was shot in 41 different sets at three studios Newtone Studios and Narasu Studios in Madras, and Raman Studio in Bombay. It was processed in London under the direct supervision of Raman. The budget of the film was ₹4 million (equivalent to ₹340 million or US$3.5 million in 2023).

== Soundtrack ==
The music was composed by S. M. Subbaiah Naidu. One of the songs from this film "Singara Velane" was well received and provided breakthrough for S. Janaki who sang the song, Nadaswaram portions for the song was played by Karaikurichi Arunachalam. Regarding the recording of the song, the singing by Janaki was recorded at the Raman Studio in Bombay, while the nadaswaram portions were recorded in Madras, and the two tracks were mixed. The song is based on Abheri raga. Another song "Orumuraiyudan" is based on Bilahari raga.

Song	Singers	Lyrics	Length
"Orumaiyudan Ninathu Thirumalaradi"	Soolamangalam Rajalakshmi	Ramalinga Adigalar	03:25
"Dhinamidhuve Subathinamithuve"	S. C. Krishnan and group	V. Seetharaman	02:10
"Kaana Kann Kodi"	Soolamangalam Rajalakshmi	V. Seetharaman	05:22
"Konjum Salangai Olikettu"	P. Leela	Kannadasan	03:50
"Brahman Thalam Poda"	Jayalakshmi, Soolamangalam Rajalakshmi	Ku. Ma. Balasubramaniam	09:57
"Singaravelane Deva"	S. Janaki	Ku. Ma. Balasubramaniam	06:14
"Vel Eduppome.... Vetri Vil Thoduppome"	S. C. Krishnan, Chorus	Ku. Ma. Balasubramaniam	
"Kannaa Nee Enge"	S. Janaki	Ku. Ma. Balasubramaniam	00:50
"Kadhal Geetham Ketkuma"	T. M. Soundararajan	Ku. Ma. Balasubramaniam	02:42
"Vasantha Kalathendralil"	P. Susheela	V. Seetharaman	03:25
"Naadanda Uthamarai.... Vanjakargal Veezhave"	T. M. Soundararajan, Chorus	Ku. Ma. Balasubramaniam	
"Konjum Salangai Olikettu"	P. Susheela	Kannadasan	03:23

== Release and reception ==
Konjum Salangai was released in India on 14 January 1962, coinciding with Pongal. It was also released outside India, with the original having subtitles in more than 22 languages by a British company. It was also dubbed into other languages and received a fair amount of notice from critics. The film marked a record for being the first Tamil film to be exhibited in Poland with a dubbed version. In a review dated 28 January 1962, The Indian Express said, "Konjum Salangai, the first Technicolor feature film of South India is a revealing experience that even our technicians can bring out in a film the rich, glossy sheen and pleasing tonal gradations comparable with that of any Technicolor product made abroad."
