= Minnal Veeran =

1959 film by Jampana

- Theatrical release poster
- Directed by: Jampana
- Story by: A. L. Narayanan
- Produced by: R. Kalyanaraman
- Starring: Ranjan; Sandhya
- Cinematography: S. J. Thomas; W. R. Subba Rao
- Music by: Vedha
- Production company: T. N. R. Productions
- Release date: 20 March 1959
- Country: India
- Language: Tamil

Minnal Veeran (transl. Lightning Warrior) is a 1959 Indian Tamil-language action adventure film directed by Jampana. The film stars Ranjan and Sandhya. It was released on 20 March 1959.

== Cast ==
- Ranjan
- Sandhya
- P. S. Veerappa
- K. R. Ramsingh

== Production ==
Minnal Veeran was directed by Jampana, and produced by R. Kalyanaraman under T. N. R. Productions. The story and dialogue were written by A. L. Narayanan. Cinematography was handled by S. J. Thomas (black and white) and W. R. Subba Rao (Gevacolor). While mainly in black and white, the film also featured some colour sequences. Its final length was 13,791 feet (4,203 m).

== Soundtrack ==
The music was composed by Vedha.

Song	Singer/s	Lyricist	Duration (m:ss)
"Kannodu Kanninai Nokki"	Seerkazhi Govindarajan & Radha Jayalakshmi	A. L. Narayanan	03:25
"Thulli Thulli Odi Aadum"	K. Jamuna Rani	A. Maruthakasi	
"Thillatangu Taangu"	S. C. Krishnan & G. Kasthuri	Thanjai N. Ramaiah Dass	
"Manamirunthaal Maargamundu"	M. L. Vasanthakumari & P. Leela	A. Maruthakasi	06:18
"Kuttai Veliyaakkava Kuruvi Josiyam"	S. C. Krishnan & T. V. Rathnam	Thanjai N. Ramaiah Dass	03:06
"Valaiyai Veesum Kaiyai"	C. Thangkappan & A. G. Rathnamala	R. Palanisamy	03:23
"Thaalelo"	P. B. Sreenivas	A. L. Narayanan	02:44

== Release and reception ==
Minnal Veeran was released on 20 March 1959, and failed commercially.
