= Panakkara Pillai =

- Poster
- Directed by: C. P. Jambulingam
- Story by: Mahendran
- Produced by: K. R. Balan
- Starring: Ravichandran; Jayalalithaa
- Music by: S. M. Subbaiah Naidu
- Production company: Annai Films
- Release date: 1968
- Running time: 143 minutes
- Country: India
- Language: Tamil

Panakkara Pillai (transl. The Rich Boy) is a 1968 Indian Tamil-language film. It stars Jayalalithaa opposite Ravichandran with a supporting cast including Nagesh, S. N. Lakshmi and M. N. Nambiar. The story was written by Mahendran and has Ravichandran in a double role. It was a successful film on its release.

== Plot ==
The family drama is a comedy of errors built around the themes of mistaken identity, wealth, and maternal affection.

== Cast ==
- Jayalalithaa
- Ravichandran as Ravi / Chandran
- Nagesh
- Manorama
- V. K. Ramasamy
- Jyothi Lakshmi
- M. N. Nambiar
- M. R. R. Vasu

== Soundtrack ==
The music was composed by S. M. Subbaiah Naidu. Lyrics were written by Vaali. The song "Namadhu Arasu", in particular was very popular from this film.

Track listing
No.	Title	Length
1.	"Maanikka Magudam"
2.	"Eppothu Naadagathai"
3.	"Namadhu Arasu"
4.	"Parisam Potta Maama"
