= M. G. Ramachandran's unrealized projects =

During his career, Indian actor-filmmaker M. G. Ramachandran had worked on a number of projects which never progressed beyond the pre-production stage under his acting commitments or direction. Some of these projects fell into development hell or were officially cancelled.

== Andru Sinthiya Ratham ==
The film, directed by C. V. Sridhar, began shooting in the 1960s, but was shelved when Ramachandran walked out after only a few days of shooting.

== Bhavani ==
The film was written by A. K. Velan and was to be directed by Masthan. Ramachandran's brother Chakrapani produced this film, which got shelved after some progress, but Chakrapani later revived this film as Arasa Kattalai with Ramachandran returning.

== Chaaya ==
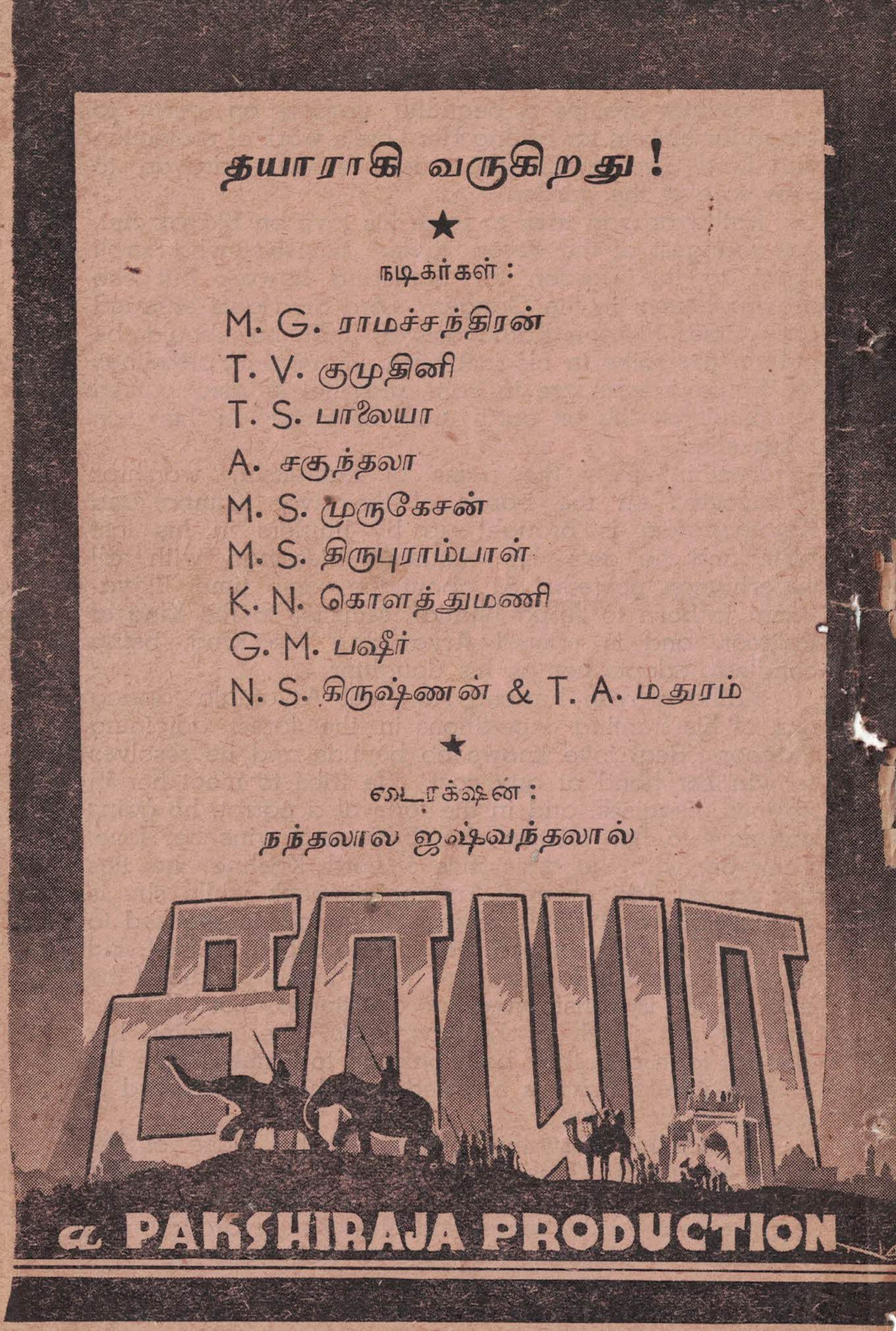
Announcement poster, 1941

The film was to be produced under the Pakshiraja banner, but failed to commence shoot.

== Maadi Veettu Ezhai ==
In 1966, Ramachandran and J. P. Chandrababu came together for a film titled Maadi Veettu Ezhai, to be produced and directed by the latter. Although the film began shooting, it was shelved due to differences between the two.

== Makkal En Pakkam ==
The film was abandoned after Ramachandran quit the film industry to enter politics.

== Nadodiyin Magan ==
The film was to have been a sequel to Ramachandran's Nadodi Mannan (1958), but never came to fruition.

== Parama Pitha ==
The film was to be based on the life of Jesus. Shooting began, but ceased permanently after Ramachandran backed out. The film was to be shot in full length Eastmancolor and release in year 1961.

== Ponniyin Selvan ==
Announcement poster

In 1958, Ramachandran announced Ponniyin Selvan, a film adaptation of Kalki Krishnamurthy's novel of the same name. Ramachandran bought the film rights to the novel for ₹10,000 (equivalent to ₹1.0 million or US$11,000 in 2026), and would produce, direct and star in the adaptation, which would feature an ensemble cast including M G Ramachandran, Gemini Ganesan, Vyjayanthimala, Padmini, Savitri, B. Saroja Devi, M. N. Rajam, T. S. Balaiah, M. N. Nambiar, O. A. K. Thevar and V. Nagayya. He planned to shoot the film at Bali Island at Indonesia. Before shooting could begin, Ramachandran met with an accident, and his injuries took six months to heal; Ramachandran was unable to continue with the film despite renewing the rights four years later.

== Uthama Puthiran ==
The film would have featured Ramachandran, but was shelved after Venus Pictures announced a film with the same name starring Sivaji Ganesan in a dual role.

== See also ==
- M. G. Ramachandran filmography

== Bibliography ==
- Kannan, R. (2017). MGR: A Life. India: Penguin Random House. ISBN 9780143429340.
