= Sri Murugan =

- Poster
- Directed by: M. Somasundaram; V. S. Narayanan
- Written by: A. S. A. Sami
- Produced by: M.Somu Sundharam; S.K.Mohideen
- Starring: Honnappa Bhagavathar; K. Malathi; M. G. Ramachandran; P. S. Veerappa; Narasimha Bharathi; M. G. Chakrapani; Kali N. Rathnam
- Cinematography: Masthan; V. Krishnan; W. R. Subba Rao
- Edited by: D. R. Gopu
- Music by: S. M. Subbaiah Naidu; S. V. Venkatraman
- Production company: Jupiter Pictures
- Release date: 27 October 1946
- Country: India
- Language: Tamil

Sri Murugan is a 1946 Indian Tamil-language film produced by Jupiter Pictures and directed by M. Somasundaram and V. S. Narayanan. The film featured Honnappa Bhagavathar in the lead role. M. G. Ramachandran performed a dance number, Shiva Thandavam along with K. Malathi in the film.

== Cast ==
The list was compiled from The Hindu article.

- Honnappa Bhagavathar
- Trichur Premavathi
- M. G. Ramachandran
- K. Malathi
- Dr. O. R. Balu
- U. R. Jeevaratnam
- (Yogam) Mangalam
- Kali N. Rathnam
- T. V. Kumudhini
- Baby Harini

== Crew ==
The list was compiled from Film News Anandan's database.

- Art: Shantaram, P. P. Chowdri, M. P. Kuttiyappu
- Choreography: K. R. Kumar
- Studio: Central Studios

== Production ==
Shiva Thandavam by MGR and K. Malathi

Initially M. K. Thyagaraja Bhagavathar was to play the lead role. After a few shots were taken with director Raja Chandrasekhar, Bhagavathar was arrested as a suspect in the Lakshmikanthan murder case. He was replaced with Bangalore-based Honnappa Bhagavathar. Raja Chandrasekhar walked out not willing to work with the newcomer. Producer M. Somasundaram directed the film along with V. S. Narayanan (who is the husband of Bhanumathi's sister).

MGR was cast in the role of Lord Shiva. He performed the Shiva Thandavam dance with Telugu actress K. Malathi. The dance was a highlight of the film and MGR worked hard and performed well. His performance impressed all and this laid the foundation for him to play as hero in Jupiter's next film Rajakumari.

== Soundtrack ==
Music was composed by S. M. Subbaiah Naidu and S. V. Venkatraman while the lyrics were penned by Papanasam Sivan.

U. R. Jeevarathinam, a female artiste, played the male role of Sage Narada and sang many songs. Honnappa Bhagavathar also had his share of songs.
