= Naaga Nandhini =

Naga Nandhini
- Directed by: G. R. Nathan
- Screenplay by: Narayanasamy
- Produced by: B. Vallinayagam
- Starring: K. Balaji; P. S. Veerappa; M. N. Nambiar; Anjali Devi; Devika
- Cinematography: G. R. Nathan
- Edited by: S. Surya (Supervising); M. P. Sivapragasam
- Music by: R. Sudarsanam
- Production company: B. V. N. Productions
- Release date: 10 February 1961
- Running time: 2:46 (14964 ft.)
- Country: India
- Language: Tamil

Naga Nandhini is a 1961 Indian Tamil language film directed by G. R. Nathan. The film stars Anjali Devi, K. Balaji and Devika. It was released on 10 February 1961.

== Cast ==
The following list is adapted from the book Thiraikalanjiyam Part-2.

Male cast

- K. Balaji
- M. N. Nambiar
- P. S. Veerappa
- K. R. Ramsingh
- Ramdas
- V. R. Rajagopal
- Narayanasamy
- Karikol Raj

Female cast

- Anjali Devi
- Devika
- Sandhya
- Rajakumari
- Ramamani Bai
- Thilagam

== Production ==
The film was produced by B. ValliNayagam under his banner B. V. N. Productions and was directed by G. R. Nathan who also handled the cinematography. A. Natarajan was the operative cameraman while special effects were handled by Harban Singh. Art direction was done by P. Angamuthu and M. Azhagappan while the stunts were managed by Shyam Sundar. Thangappan was in charge of choreography. Still photography was done by P. K. Nataraj. The film was shot at AVM, Golden and Shyamala Studios. Processing was done by T. Jegatheesan at Madras Cine Laboratory and Eastman Colour was done at Gemini Colour lab.

== Soundtrack ==
Music was composed by R. Sudarsanam.

Song	Singer/s	Lyricist	Length
"Anjathe Kanne Anjaathe"	L. R. Eswari	Sundara Kannan	05:03
"Singame Singame Ingu Vaa"	Soolamangalam Jayalakshmi, Soolamangalam Rajalakshmi & group	Sundara Kannan	
"Kaadhal Illadhu Aanandham Edhu"	A. M. Rajah & K. Jamuna Rani	M. K. Athmanathan	03:42
"Kannum Kannum Onnaachchi"	L. R. Eswari & R. S. Mani	Thanjai N. Ramaiah Dass	
"Malar Vaaniye...Kavikuyil Neethaanaa, Kaaviyam Neethaanaa"	K. Jamuna Rani & P. B. Srinivas	Thanjai N. Ramaiah Dass	02:47
"Penn Maanam Kaakkum Thanmaanam Onre"	K. Jamuna Rani	Thanjai N. Ramaiah Dass	01:35
"Mana Oonjalile Aadum Mannaa"	P. Leela	Thanjai N. Ramaiah Dass	
"Thillaanaa Illennaa Thiththikaadhu Veeranna"	P. Susheela	Thanjai N. Ramaiah Dass	
"Valluvan Vedham Maravaadhe"	Soolamangalam Sisters		
