= Raja Veetu Pillai =

- Poster
- Directed by: Dada Mirasi
- Written by: M. K. Santharam
- Produced by: P. L. Mohanram
- Starring: Jaishankar; Jayalalithaa
- Cinematography: W. R. Subbarao
- Edited by: S. A. Murugan
- Music by: S. M. Subbaiah Naidu
- Production company: Mohan Productions
- Release date: 1967
- Running time: 115 minutes
- Country: India
- Language: Tamil

Raja Veetu Pillai (transl. The boy from the king's home) is a 1967 Indian Tamil-language film directed by Dada Mirasi and written by M. K. Santharam. The film stars Jaishankar and Jayalalithaa. It was a successful film on its release. Jayalalithaa dressed up as a cowgirl with shorts and started off a trend.

== Cast ==
Male cast

- Jaishankar as Raja
- M. N. Nambiar as Anand
- V. S. Raghavan as Raghunathan's father
- Srikanth as Raghunathan
- Thengai Srinivasan as Singaram

Female cast

- Jayalalithaa as Raja's love interest
- Pushpalatha as Geetha
- Jayabharathi as Anandhi

== Production ==
The film originally began production under the title Inba Nila, with M. G. Ramachandran starring. It was later shelved, but restarted production under the title Raja Veetu Pillai, with Ramachandran now replaced by Jaishankar.

== Soundtrack ==
All the songs were written by Vaali and the music was composed by S. M. Subbaiah Naidu.

Title	Singer(s)	Length
"Poovu"	L. R. Eswari	3:29
"Raja Veetu Pillaiyaanalum"	T. M. Soundararajan, L. R. Eswari	4:32
"Oorukkellaam"	T. M. Soundararajan, P. Susheela	3:38
"Andru Ninaithom"	T. M. Soundararajan, P. Susheela	5:01
"Paithiyakaran"	T. M. Soundararajan	4:06

== Reception ==
Kalki wrote what's new in this film, you have to put on magnifying glasses and see. A research team can be appointed for this.

== Bibliography ==
- Cowie, Peter; Elley, Derek, eds. (1977). World Filmography: 1967. Fairleigh Dickinson Univ Press. ISBN 0-498-01565-3.
