= Aasai Mugam =

- Theatrical release poster
- Directed by: P. Pullayya
- Screenplay by: Aaroor Dass "Thuraiyoor" K. Murthy
- Story by: T. N. Balu
- Produced by: P. L. Mohan Ram
- Starring: M. G. Ramachandran; B. Saroja Devi; M. N. Nambiar
- Cinematography: P. L. Roy; W. R. Subba Rao; T. M. Sundar Babu
- Edited by: C. P. Jambulingam; P. K. Krishnan; S. R. Das; K. R. Krishnan
- Music by: S. M. Subbaiah Naidu
- Production company: Mohan Productions
- Release date: 10 December 1965
- Running time: 145 minutes
- Country: India
- Language: Tamil

Aasai Mugam (transl. Face of Desire) is a 1965 Indian Tamil-language film directed by P. Pullayya. The film stars M. G. Ramachandran, B. Saroja Devi and M. N. Nambiar. Inspired by the 1934 and 1956 film versions of the novel The Man Who Knew Too Much, it was released on 10 December 1965.

== Plot ==
Varadha, an ill-intentioned fraudster, concocts a plan to use plastic surgery to change his accomplice Vajravel's face to make him look like Manohar, who is the son of a rich estate owner named Sivasankaran, and steal Sivashankaran's estate. He convinces Vajravel to go through plastic surgery. However, Vajravel's wife who overhears the plan disapproved to no avail.

Manohar falls in love with Selvi and sends a message through his secretary. Sivasankaran agrees to the marriage and proceeds with the preparation. Meanwhile, Vajravel goes through plastic surgery and changes his face to appear like Manohar's face. Vajravel, now looking like Manohar, is beaten by thugs on his way to Manohar's house. Manohar returns to his home to confront Selvi's mother who is arranging for another marriage for Selvi. Sivasankaran receives a phone call from the police mentioning that their son was beaten up by thugs and that the police are taking care of him. Confusion follows at Sivashankaran's house, and they all conclude the real Manohar as fake and believe the one with the police is indeed the real Manohoran. Kamala, an old friend of Selvi comes to share her sad story of marrying someone who she thought was an honest man. Kamala further shares the secret plan hatched by Varadha where Vajravel, following plastic surgery, switches to Manohar. As promised, Manohar comes to meet Selvi, and she believes that he is Vajravel and convinces Manohar to get back with Kamala.

At Sivashankaran's residence, Vajravel, now looking like Manohar and pretending to have temporary memory loss, arrives beaten up and every one believe that he is indeed Manohar. Manohar's mother invites Selvi back to meet Vajravel who now appears like Manohar. Meanwhile Manohar asks his guardian to take Kamala to meet Vajravel who is disguised as Manohar at Sivashankaran's home. Kamala realizes the switch and begs Vajravel to get back, but he refuses. Distraught Kamala gets back to Manohar. Manohar promises to get them both together.

Selvi takes Vajravel to rekindle his memory but being Vajravel he does not recall what happened between Selvi and Manohar. When they return, they find, Manohar who arrived in disguise as Sivashankaran's long last uncle. Manohar, now pretending to be Sivashankaran's uncle decides to stay in the room adjacent to Vajravel. In the midst of this, Sivashankaran's real uncle turns up exposing Manohar's disguise. Noticing this Manohar escapes from Sivashankaran's home and take Kamala from his guardian's home and proceeds to infiltrate Varadha's gang which they successfully do. At home, both Selvi and Sankara start doubting if Vajravel was indeed Manohar.

On the following day during the wedding, Manohar cooks up a plan to switch Vajravel and sit instead of him. Manohar picks up the acid and smears on Vajravel reverting his plastic surgery and exposing him. Manohar forgives Vajravel who becomes an approver in the case against Varadha who was it turns out to be the Sivashankaran's former estate manager.

The movie ends with both Manohar and Selvi getting married and Vajravel and Kamala getting back together.

== Cast ==
- M. G. Ramachandran as Manohar, Vajravel and Burma Chitappa Ramalingam
- B. Saroja Devi as Selvi
- M. N. Nambiar as Varatha, alias Varathan
- Nagesh as Sankara, Manohar's secretary
- K. D. Santhanam as Sivasankaran Pillai
- S. V. Ramadas as Vajravel
- K. R. Ramsingh as the plastic surgeon
- "Loose" Aarumugham
- Geethanjali as Kamala
- Lakshmi Prabha as Maragatham
- C. K. Saraswathi as Bhavani
- Karikol Raju as Varatha's henchman

== Production ==
The film was inspired by the 1934 and 1956 film versions of the novel The Man Who Knew Too Much. It was initially titled Ellam Arintha Manithan (transl. All Knowing Man), but Ramachandran objected as he felt it was "too pompous" and "big". He suggested Aasai Mugam, and that was chosen. K. P. Ramakrishnan served as Ramachandran's body double.

== Soundtrack ==
The music was composed by S. M. Subbaiah Naidu, with lyrics written by Vaali.

Song	Singers	Length
"Neeya Illai Naana" (x2)	T. M. Soundararajan & P. Susheela	03:21 / 04:23 (film version)
"Yaarukku Yaar Endru Theriyaadha"	T. M. Soundararajan & P. Susheela	02:52 / 03:05 (film version)
"Ennai Kadhalithal Mattum Pothuma"	T. M. Soundararajan & P. Susheela	03:37 / 03:49 (film version)
"Ethanai Periya" (Innoruvar Vaedhanai)	T. M. Soundararajan	03:41 / 04:24 (film version)
"Naal Oru Medai Pozhudhoru Nadippu"	T. M. Soundararajan	03:26 / 03:12 (film version)

== Release and reception ==
Aasai Mugam was released on 10 December 1965. T. M. Ramachandran of Sport and Pastime wrote "The film moves in such a fast manner that it sustains the interest of the audience throughout. The deft hand of veteran P. Pulliah can be seen in every foot of the film". The Indian Express negatively reviewed the film, but praised the performances of Ramachandran and Saroja Devi, despite feeling their roles were not well written. Kalki praised Ramachandran for showing diversity in the three roles he enacted.
