= Jyothi Lakshmi =

Indian actress (1948–2016)

- Born: 2 November 1948
- Died: 9 August 2016 (aged 67); Chennai
- Occupation: Actress
- Years active: 1963–2016
- Children: Jyothi Meena

Jyothi Lakshmi (2 November 1948 – 9 August 2016) was an Indian actress who appeared in more than 130 movies. In the early 1970s, she was well noted for her leading roles and songs in movies. She also acted in female-oriented movies and was a trained dancer. She predominantly worked in Tamil, Telugu, Kannada, and Malayalam movies. In the early 1980s, her popularity gradually declined due to her sister Jayamalini's entry into the movie industry. Her debut was in the film Vanambadi in 1963 as a dancer in the song 'Yaaradi Vanthaar'. She is best remembered for her supporting roles in Thedi Vandha Mappillai and Periya Idathu Penn.

Her daughter Jyothi Meena is also an actress.

== Filmography ==
Year	Title	Role	Language	Notes
1963	Vanambadi	Dancer	Tamil	Debut Film
1963	Periya Idathu Penn		Tamil	
1965	Murappennu		Malayalam	
1965	Kulla Agent 000		Kannada	
1966	Bangalore Mail		Kannada	
1967	Pattanathil Bhootham		Tamil	
1967	Pedda Akkayya		Telugu	
1967	Punyavathi		Telugu	
1967	Kunjali Marakkar		Malayalam	
1967	Nagarame Nandi		Malayalam	
1968	Galatta Kalyanam		Tamil	
1968	Poovum Pottum		Tamil	
1968	Panakkara Pillai		Tamil	
1968	Aggi Meeda Guggilam		Telugu	
1968	Bhagya Chakramu		Telugu	
1968	Nene Monaganni		Telugu	
1968	Vichitra Kutumbam		Telugu	
1968	Circar Express		Telugu	
1968	Inspector		Malayalam	
1968	Kodungallooramma		Malayalam	
1968	Goa Dalli CID 999		Kannada	
1968	Payal Ki Jhankar		Hindi	
1969	Adimaippenn		Tamil	
1969	Muhurtha Balam	Rajini	Telugu	
1969	Takkari Donga Chakkani Chukka		Telugu	
1969	Prathidhwani		Kannada	
1970	Thalaivan		Tamil	
1970	Thedi Vandha Mappillai	Jaya	Tamil	
1970	Vairakyam		Tamil	
1970	Janmabhoomi		Telugu	
1970	Allude Menalludu		Telugu	
1970	Vijayam Manade		Telugu	
1970	Thalla? Pellama?		Telugu	
1970	Marina Manishi		Telugu	
1970	Kathanayika Molla		Telugu	
1970	Pettandarulu		Telugu	
1970	Lakshmi Kataksham		Telugu	
1970	Thaali Bottu	Jyothi	Telugu	
1970	Paga Saadistha		Telugu	
1970	Jawab		Hindi	
1971	Neerum Neruppum		Tamil	
1971	Rickshawkaran		Tamil	
1971	Basthi Bul Bul		Telugu	
1971	Pattindalla Bangaram		Telugu	
1971	Pagabattina Paduchu		Telugu	
1971	Chalaki Rani Khiladi Raja		Telugu	
1971	Adrusta Jathakudu		Telugu	
1971	Mosagallaku Mosagadu		Telugu	
1971	Sisindri Chittibabu		Telugu	
1971	Andariki Monagadu		Telugu	
1971	Prema Nagar		Telugu	
1971	Bhale Papa		Telugu	
1971	James Bond 777		Telugu	
1971	Rajakota Rahasyam		Telugu	
1972	Yaar Jambulingam		Tamil	
1972	Somaripothu		Telugu	
1972	Prajanayakudu		Telugu	
1972	Bhale Mosagadu		Telugu	
1972	Gandara Gandadu		Telugu	
1972	Manavudu Danavudu		Telugu	
1972	Kathula Rathaiah		Telugu	
1972	Pilla? Piduga?	Neeli	Telugu	
1972	Amma Maata		Telugu	
1972	Korada Rani		Telugu	
1972	Monagadostunnadu Jagratha		Telugu	
1972	Pistolwali		Hindi	
1972	Hantakulu Devaantakulu		Telugu	
1973	Memu Manushulame		Telugu	
1973	Panjaramlo Pasipapa		Telugu	
1973	Jyothi Lakshmi		Telugu	
1973	Jeevitham		Telugu	
1973	Bala Mitrula Katha		Telugu	
1973	Ida Lokham		Telugu	
1973	Hifazat		Hindi	
1974	Manushulu Matti Bommalu		Telugu	
1974	Gundelu Teesina Monagadu		Telugu	
1975	Unga Veetu Kalyanam		Tamil	
1975	Alibabayum 41 Kallanmaarum		Malayalam	
1975	Devudu Chesina Pelli		Telugu	
1976	Uttamaralu		Telugu	
1977	Kurukshetram		Telugu	
1977	Oke Raktham		Telugu	
1979	Peddillu Chinnillu		Telugu	
1979	Gandharvya Kanya		Telugu	
1979	Cheyyethi Jai Kottu		Telugu	
1980	Maha Shakti		Telugu	
1980	Kalyana Chakravarthy		Telugu	
1980	Sita Ramulu		Telugu	
1980	Kottapeta Rowdy		Telugu	
1980	Adrushtavanthudu		Telugu	
1980	Bebbuli		Telugu	
1980	Sri Vemana Charithra		Telugu	
1980	Sardar Paparayudu		Telugu	
1980	Manushyamrigam		Malayalam	
1980	Bhaktha Hanuman		Malayalam	
1980	Haddina Kannu		Kannada	
1981	Babulugaddi Deeba		Telugu	
1981	Thadavara		Malayalam	
1981	Sanchari		Malayalam	
1982	Ragam Thedum Pallavi		Tamil	
1982	Bobbili Puli		Telugu	
1982	Raja Mahal		Telugu	
1982	Chellida Raktha		Kannada	
1982	Oorige Upakari		Kannada	
1983	Ennai Paar En Azhagai Paar		Tamil	
1983	Dharma Poratam	Mohini	Telugu	
1983	Kanthayya Kanakayya	Sundari	Telugu	
1984	24 Mani Neram		Tamil	
1984	Bharatamlo Sankharavam		Telugu	
1984	Hero		Telugu	
1985	Visha Kanya		Telugu	
1985	Lanchavatharam		Telugu	
1985	Maha Manishi		Telugu	
1986	Chaitanyam		Telugu	
1987	Nayakan		Tamil	
1987	Naag Mani		Hindi	
1989	State Rowdy	Rambha	Telugu	
1995	Muthu		Tamil	
1995	Big Boss		Telugu	
1995	Pokiri Raja		Telugu	
1997	Dharma Chakkaram		Tamil	
1997	Vaimaye Vellum		Tamil	
1997	Pasamulla Pandiyare		Tamil	
1997	Nesam		Tamil	
1998	Maru Malarchi		Tamil	
1999	Sethu		Tamil	
2000	Ennamma Kannu		Tamil	
2001	Middle Class Madhavan		Tamil	
2001	En Purushan Kuzhandhai Maadhiri		Tamil	
2001	Vijaya Dashami		Kannada	
2002	Seshu		Telugu	
2002	Kalusukovalani		Telugu	
2003	Annai Kaligambal		Tamil	
2003	Donga Ramudu & Party		Telugu	
2003	Raktha Kanneeru		Kannada	
2003	Shri Kalikamba		Kannada	
2004	M. Kumaran S/O Mahalakshmi		Tamil	
2004	Sahukara		Kannada	
2006	Pachchak Kuthira		Tamil	
2008	Sandai		Tamil	
2008	Kuberulu		Telugu	
2009	Jaganmohini		Tamil	
2009	Bangaru Babu		Telugu	
2011	Siruthai		Tamil	
2012	Kozhi Koovuthu		Tamil	
2015	Vasuvum Saravananum Onna Padichavanga		Tamil	
2015	Trisha Illana Nayanthara		Tamil	
2016	Kavalai Vendam		Tamil	Last Film

== Serial ==
- All serials are in Tamil, unless otherwise noted.

Year	Title	Role	Channel	Note
2002-2004	Velan	Naagamma	Sun TV	
2002-2005	Annamalai	Gandhimathi	Sun TV	
2005	Raja Rajeswari	Podakki	Sun TV	
2010	Vasantham	Kanagavalli	Sun TV	
2015-2016	Valli	Rajeswari	Sun TV	Last serial

== Death ==
She died in Chennai on 8 August 2016 due to blood cancer.
