= Therottam =

- Poster
- Directed by: V. T. Arasu
- Written by: Singaravelan
- Produced by: V. T. Arasu
- Starring: Gemini Ganesan; Padmini; Cho Ramaswamy
- Music by: S. M. Subbaiah Naidu
- Production company: Sashti Films
- Release date: 16 July 1971
- Country: India
- Language: Tamil

Therottam (transl. Driving the chariot) is a 1971 Indian Tamil-language film produced and directed by V. T. Arasu. The film stars Gemini Ganesan, Padmini and Cho Ramaswamy. It was released on 16 July 1971.

== Cast ==
- Gemini Ganesan
- Padmini
- Cho Ramaswamy
- Sivakumar

== Soundtrack ==
The soundtrack was composed by S. M. Subbaiah Naidu, with lyrics by Kannadasan.

Track listing
No.	Title	Singer(s)	Length
1.	"Iraivan Boomikku Vanthal"	T. M. Soundararajan
2.	"Ulagam Enbathu Inimai"	T. M. Soundararajan
3.	"Nandri Solla Vendum"	T. M. Soundararajan, P. Susheela

== Release and reception ==
Therottam was released on 16 July 1971. A writer of Film Word praised Cho's performance as a Tamil speaking Andhra Pradesh lawyer, calling it one of the "very few outstanding performances" of that year, and said there were some "good early scenes" between Ganesan and Padmini.
