= Sabhash Suri =

- Theatrical release poster
- Directed by: I. N. Murthy
- Written by: Acharya Aatreya (dialogues)
- Screenplay by: I. N. Murthy
- Story by: Sakthi T. K. Krishnasamy
- Based on: Periya Idathu Penn (1963)
- Produced by: T. R. Chakravarthy
- Starring: N. T. Rama Rao; Krishna Kumari
- Cinematography: Malli Irani
- Edited by: M. S. Mani
- Music by: Pendyala Nageswara Rao
- Production company: R.R. Pictures
- Release date: 19 September 1964
- Running time: 160 minutes
- Country: India
- Language: Telugu

Sabhash Suri (transl. Well done, Suri) is an 1964 Indian Telugu-language romantic comedy film, produced by T. R. Chakravarthy under the R. R. Pictures banner and directed by I. N. Murthy. It stars N. T. Rama Rao, Krishna Kumari with the music composed by Pendyala Nageswara Rao. The film is a remake of the Tamil film Periya Idathu Penn (1963).

== Cast ==
- N. T. Rama Rao as Suryam
- Krishna Kumari as Jalaja
- Rajanala as Seshu
- Ramana Reddy as Kailasam
- Padmanabham as Vaali
- Jagga Rao as Mastanaiah
- Geetanjali as Gowri
- Sandhya as Nagamma
- Vasanthi as Ganga

== Soundtrack ==
Music composed by Pendyala Nageswara Rao. Lyrics were written by Acharya Aatreya.

| No. | Song | Singers | Length |
|---|---|---|---|
| 1 | "Ee Vennela" (Happy) | Ghantasala, P. Susheela | 3:44 |
| 2 | "Kalavari Aliveni" | Ghantasala, P. Susheela | 5:46 |
| 3 | "Choodu Choodu" | Ghantasala | 3:20 |
| 4 | "Anaga Anagaa Oka" | P. Susheela | 4:03 |
| 5 | "Poovu Poovu" | Ghantasala, P. Susheela | 4:58 |
| 6 | "Bitthara Pothavenduke" | T. M. Soundararajan | 3:01 |
| 7 | "Ee Vennela" (Pathos) | Ghantasala | 3:38 |
| 8 | "Devudikem Haayiga" | Ghantasala | 3:33 |
