= Periya Idathu Penn =

1963 film by T. R. Ramanna

- Theatrical release poster
- Directed by: T. R. Ramanna
- Written by: Sakthi T. K. Krishnasamy
- Produced by: T. R. Ramanna
- Starring: M. G. Ramachandran; B. Saroja Devi
- Cinematography: M. A. Rahman
- Edited by: M. S. Mani
- Music by: Viswanathan–Ramamoorthy
- Production company: R. R. Pictures
- Release date: 10 May 1963
- Running time: 156 minutes
- Country: India
- Language: Tamil

Periya Idathu Penn (transl. The Wealthy Woman) is a 1963 Indian Tamil-language romantic comedy film, directed by T. R. Ramanna. The film stars M. G. Ramachandran, B. Saroja Devi, M. R. Radha and T. R. Rajakumari. It was released on 10 May 1963. The film was blockbuster, the highest-grossing film of the year and ran more than 100 days. The film was remade in Telugu as Sabhash Suri and in Hindi as Jawab. The story of the 1982 Tamil film Sakalakala Vallavan was also inspired by this film.

== Plot ==
Murugappan is a small-time farm labourer who lives with his widowed elder sister Gangamma in a village. Kaïlasam Pillaival is the zamindar of the village, Sabapathy and Punitha are his children. Punitha is studying in college in a nearby town, while Sabapathy is not educated. Like the father, the children are both arrogant about their wealth and try to rule the villagers. Murugappa tries to question their authority and this leads to frequent clashes with the zamindar's family. Pitamdhi is a wealthy college mate of Punitha, who is crazy about her. Sabapathy falls in love with Thillaiammal (Manimala), who has been informally engaged to Murugappa for a long time. Both Pillaival and Gangamma ask for her hand in marriage on the same day.

To avoid a direct clash with the zamindar, her father says that he took a vow that his daughter would marry the winner of a silambam competition. Punitha promises to marry Pitamdhi if he dopes a drink which Murugappa drinks during the fight. Sabapathy wins the fight and marries Thillaiammal. Punitha goes back on her word and an angry Pitamdhi confesses his duplicity to Murugappa, who confronts Punitha, the two get into an argument during which Murugappa wows to marry Punitha. The two families get into another clash regarding the villagers' right to worship at the temple at the same time as Pillaival. In retaliation he sends his henchmen to beat up Murugappa and burn down their house. When Gangamma confronts him, he rapes her and she disappears after writing a suicide note to her brother urging him to leave the village and make a living elsewhere. Pillaival is haunted by the fear that Gangamma would return from the grave to take revenge.

Murugappan goes to the city where he meets Pitamdhi again. Pitamdhi does a Pygmalion on him and Murugappa emerges from the tutelage as Azhagappa competent in English, and even knows to play the piano. He meets Punitha at a club and the two begin dating. She fails to connect the suave Azhagappa with the village bumpkin Murugappa and falls for him. Pillaival gets an anonymous letter informing him that his daughter is in love with someone in the city and he sends for her immediately and confronts her. She admits to being in love with Azhagappa and her family decides to get them married. Azhagappa and Pitamdhi as Arulappan and his secretary meet Pillaival and the marriage takes place. He meets Thillaiammal's father and reveals his identity to him. He discovers that Pillaival is responsible for his sister's death and the whole family becomes aware. Sabapathy tries to support his father and Punitha opposes him. Azhagappa reveals his real identity, Murugappa and walks out of the marriage. He finds it impossible to live with Punitha after knowing what her father did to his sister.

Punitha discovers that she is pregnant and with the help of her sister-in-law Thillaiammal, meets Murugappan and tells him the truth. Murugappan is caught between his desires to live with his wife and avenge his sister's death. Sabapathy discovers her there and gets into a fight with Murugappan. Confronted by a deadlock situation, Punitha initially contemplates suicide, but decides to live and have the baby. Pitamdhi meanwhile, falls in love with Thillaiammal's young sister Valli and learns silambam from their father in order to wed her. Murugappan and Punitha have a baby boy and are still unable to be together. Murugappan longs to see his baby and goes to her house secretly at night. He finds that Pillaival has been stabbed.

Punitha and Sabapathy think that their father was killed by Murugappan, who tries to follow the killer and finds out that it is his sister. She says that she was in hiding, waiting for a chance to avenge herself and advises him to return to his wife and son. Meanwhile, he is confronted by Sabapathy and the police pursue Gangamma, who jumps off a bridge and kills herself. All they find is a note from her confessing to Pillaival's murder and urging Murugappan to return to his wife, Punitha. Pitamdhi marries Valli and the family unites.

== Cast ==
- M. G. Ramachandran as Azhagappan alias Murugappan
- B. Saroja Devi as Punitha
- M. R. Radha as Kailasam Pillai
- S. A. Ashokan as Sabapathy
- Nagesh as Arulappan alias Pitamdhi
- N. S. K. Kolappan as Kolappa
- T. R. Rajakumari as Gangamma
- Manimala as Thillaiammal
- Jyothi Lakshmi as Valli
- Sethupadhi as The father of Thillaiammal and Valli

== Soundtrack ==
The music was composed by Viswanathan–Ramamoorthy, with lyrics by Kannadasan. Once, Kannadasan arrived at 4:00am at Viswanathan's house when Viswanathan was asleep, but the guard denied him entry; Kannadasan wrote "Avanukku enna thoongivittan, agapattavan naan allava" on a paper and gave it to the guard, who gave the paper to Viswanathan when he woke up. Those lines became the basis for a song. The song "Andru Vandhathum" is set in Shankarabharanam raga. That song was later retuned by Yuvan Shankar Raja for Kannamoochi Yenada (2007). The original song was presented by Shazaa and Ebi Shankara on the occasion of the National Day Parade commemorating the 59th independence of Singapore.

Song	Singers	Length
"Andru Vandhadhum" (Happy)	T. M. Soundararajan, P. Susheela	03:09
"Andru Vandhadhum" (Pathos)	T. M. Soundararajan, P. Susheela	03:00
"Avanukkena Thoongi"	T. M. Soundararajan	02:43
"Kannenna Kannenna"	T. M. Soundararajan	03:14
"Kattodu Kuzhalaada"	P. Susheela, T. M. Soundararajan, L. R. Eswari	04:58
"Paarappa Pazhaniappa"	T. M. Soundararajan	03:01
"Thulli Odum Kaalgal"	T. M. Soundararajan, P. Susheela	03:29
"Ragasiyam Parama"	P. Susheela	

== Release and reception ==
Periya Idathu Penn was released on 10 May 1963. The film was well received by P. V. Cherian (then the chairman of the Madras Legislative Council) and Jothi Venkatachalam (then the Madras Minister for Health). The latter praised the film's moral values. Kanthan of Kalki said every scene was worth applauding.
