= Chitrapu Narayana Rao =

Indian film director

Chitrapu Narayana Murthy
- Born: 1913; Bandar, Andhra Pradesh, India
- Died: 1985 (aged 71–72)
- Occupations: Director; Producer
- Spouse: Chitrapu Anasuya Devi
- Children: Chitrapu Laxmana Prasad, Chitrapu Ashok Kumar, Chitrapu Shiva Prakash, Chitrapu Vijayalaxmi

Chitrapu Narayana Rao (born Chithrapu Narayana Murthy; 1913-1985) was an Indian film director and producer known for his works in Telugu and Tamil cinema. He received a Certificate of Merit for the Third Best Tamil Film for Edhir Paradhathu (1958) and Annaiyin Aanai (1962). He also won the Nandi Award for the 1967 Telugu film Bhakta Prahlada.

== Personal life ==
He was born at Machilipatnam, Andhra Pradesh in 1913. Film director, Chitrapu Narasimha Rao, was his brother. He lost his son in 1962. He died in the year 1985.

== Career ==
He started his film career assisting his younger brother Chitrapu Narasimha Rao in films like Seetha Kalyanam, Sati Tulasi, Mohini Rukhmangadha and Krishna Jarasandha. His directorial debut was Bhakta Markandeya starring Vemuri Gaggayya and Sriranjani. The film had done well establishing him as a director. He subsequently directed many movies like Myravana, Bhakta Prahlada, Daksha Yagnam, Bheeshma in both Telugu and Tamil languages. During the same period, He wanted to direct a movie for AVM Productions to regain his financial status. They started working on Bhakta Prahlada in 1965, for the first time in Eastman color. It was technically far superior to the Black and White version he made 25 years earlier. D. V. Narasa Raju was the co-writer for the project. The film was a box office success.

== Awards ==
Nandi Awards

- Nandi Award for Second Best Feature Film (director) - Bhakta Prahlada

== Filmography ==
1. Bhakta Markandeya (1938)
2. Mahiravana (1940)
3. Dakshayagnam (1941)
4. Bhakta Prahlada (1942)
5. Bhakta Kabir (1944)
6. Bhishma (1944)
7. Samsara Naradi (1944)
8. Brahma Ratham (1947)
9. Madalasa (1948)
10. En Thangai (Tamil, 1952)
11. Naa Chellelu (1953)
12. Edhir Paradhathu (Tamil, 1954)
13. Adarshasati (1956)
14. Naga Panchami (1956)
15. Nagula Chaviti (1956)
16. Pathini Deivam (Tamil, 1957)
17. Annaiyin Aanai (Tamil, 1958)
18. Manamalai (Tamil, 1958)
19. Naan Valartha Thangai (Tamil, 1958)
20. Deivame Thunai (Tamil, 1959)
21. Bhaktha Sabari (1960)
22. Bhakta Shabari (Tamil, 1960)
23. Bhakta Shabari (Kannada, 1960)
24. Krishna Kuchela (1961) (director and producer)
25. Tallichina Ajna (1961)
26. Chittor Rani Padmini (Tamil, 1963)
27. Pativrata (1964)
28. Bhakta Prahlada (1967)
