= Thayin Madiyil =

1964 film by Adurthi Subba Rao

- Theatrical release poster
- Directed by: Adurthi Subba Rao
- Written by: Sornam
- Produced by: K. R. Balan
- Starring: M. G. Ramachandran; B. Saroja Devi
- Cinematography: R. R. Chandran
- Music by: S. M. Subbaiah Naidu
- Production company: Annai Films
- Release date: 18 December 1964
- Country: India
- Language: Tamil

Thayin Madiyil (transl. In mother's lap) is a 1964 Indian Tamil-language film directed by Adurthi Subba Rao, starring M. G. Ramachandran and B. Saroja Devi. It was released on 18 December 1964.

== Plot ==
Raja, a champion jockey leads a very happy and disciplined life. Raja meets Jeeva, the only daughter of a wealthy businessman, Bhupathi, and both fall head over heels in love with each other. Raja is an orphan. Years later, he learns of his mother and the injustice meted out to her in life. Raja vows to find his father and take revenge. Raja is overjoyed to meet his mother who he believed was dead, but his happiness is short lived, when his mother reveals that he is the son of Bhupathi.

== Cast ==
The list adapted from the book Thiraikalanjiyam Part-2.

Male cast

- M. G. Ramachandran as Raja
- M. N. Nambiar
- M. R. Radha as Sigamani
- Nagesh
- T. S. Muthaiah as Boopathy
- Thirupathisamy

Female cast

- B. Saroja Devi as Jeeva
- Pandari Bai as Kaveri
- Manorama
- Geetanjali
- G. Sakunthala as Bhavani
- Lakshmiprabha

== Production ==
The film was produced by K. R. Balan under the banner Annai Films and was directed by A. Subba Rao. R. R.Chandran handled the cinematography while Sornam wrote the screenplay and dialogues.

== Soundtrack ==
Music was composed by S. M. Subbaiah Naidu.

Song	Singer/s	Lyricist
"Penne Ondru Sollavaa"	P. Susheela	Vaali
"Kallirukkum Roja Malar"	T. M. Soundararajan & P. Susheela	Kannadasan
"Raajaathi Kaathirundhaa"	T. M. Soundararajan & P. Susheela	Vaali
"Ennaip Paarthu Edhai Paarthaalum"	T. M. Soundararajan & P. Susheela	Vaali
"Ethanai Selvangal Vandhaalume"	T. M. Soundararajan	Vaali
"Paarvaiyile Pandhal Katti"	P. Susheela	Vaali

== Reception ==
Writing for Sport and Pastime, T. M. Ramachandran said, "The story follows the beaten track and in a nutshell, the audience get the same kind of dish they are used to. A striking feature that stands out, however, in the film is the acting of M. G Ramachandran".
