= Thalaivan (1970 film) =

- Theatrical release poster
- Directed by: P. A. Thomas; Singhu Muthu
- Written by: A. Abdul Muthalib
- Dialogue by: R. K. Shanmugham
- Produced by: P. A. Thomas
- Starring: M. G. Ramachandran; Vanisree; S. A. Ashokan
- Cinematography: P. S. Nagappa
- Edited by: V. Rajagopal
- Music by: S. M. Subbaiah Naidu
- Production company: Thomas Pictures
- Release date: 24 July 1970
- Country: India
- Language: Tamil

Thalaivan (transl. Leader) is a 1970 Indian Tamil-language thriller film, directed by P. A. Thomas. The film stars M. G. Ramachandran and Vanisree, while M. N. Nambiar and S. A. Ashokan portray the antagonists. It was released on 24 July 1970, and failed at the box office.

== Plot ==
Sanguili is a man without faith nor law. He extorts, kidnaps if necessary, murders and desires for a very long time, the fabulous treasure of the king of neighbourhood.

At the time of seizing it, where he fails, he kills the king and puts the blame of this heinous crime on his wife, the queen, who is pregnant.

All the indications point to the poor queen, who eventually volatilises.

The only one, Velamma, who could acquit her, is silenced by the threats of Sanguili and ome years pass.

Ilango, a particularly very effective secret agent (grace, among others, in its total control of the yoga and to his knowledge complete of the well done of healing plants, inherited from his father, Moghan Ram, an herbalist of great renown) is sent by his superiors with a mission to stop the actions of Sanguili.

A map is in the centre of this case, because it indicates the location exact of the famous treasure, so looked for, for years by Sanguili.

== Cast ==
Actor	Role
M. G. Ramachandran	as Ilango (alias Thalaivan), an Indian spy officer
M. N. Nambiar	as Sangili
S. A. Ashokan	as Bhairavan
Nagesh	as Pandjavarnam
O. A. K. Thevar	as Soma Sundaram
Vanisree	as Usha, Ilango's lover
Jodhilakshimi	as Paruvakodi, the tribal girl
Manorama	as Palamma
G. Sakunthala	as Velamma
S. V. Ramadoss	as the King Marthanda Boopathy (Ilango Father)
Kumari Rukmini	as Queen Manimegalai (Ilango Mother)
S. Rama Rao	as
Trichy Soundararajan	as the Commanding Officer
K. Nadarajan (or) K. Nadaraja Iyer	as Mohan Ram

== Production ==
The film faced numerous production troubles for over 18 months, including financial and call sheet issues.

== Soundtrack ==
The music was composed by S. M. Subbaiah Naidu, while the lyrics were written by Vaali. In his memoir, Vaali wrote that Ramachandran told him, "Unlike for other movies, I had given the most number of call sheets for this movie. More than 18 months had passed: finance problem, call sheet problem, and also a particular lyric you had written when it was recorded on the first day of ‘pooja’ shooting, that turned out to be a bad omen. Vaali, the movie's title is Thalaivan (i.e., leader). You had written a line that Thalaivan hasn't come yet".

Title	Singer(s)
"Arivukku Velaikodu"	T. M. Soundararajan
"Neerazhi Mandabathil"	P. Susheela, S. P. Balasubrahmanyam
"Odayile Oru Thamarai Poo"	T. M. Soundararajan, L. R. Eswari
"Paai Viriththathu"	T. M. Soundararajan, P. Susheela
