= The Man Who Knew Too Much (book) =

1922 detective stories by G. K. Chesterton

The Man Who Knew Too Much: And Other Stories
- First edition
- Author: G. K. Chesterton
- Language: English
- Genre: Detective stories
- Publisher: Cassell and Company (U.K.); Harper Brothers (U.S.)
- Publication date: 1922
- Publication place: United Kingdom
- Media type: Print (hardback)
- Pages: 308
- Text: The Man Who Knew Too Much: And Other Stories at Wikisource

The Man Who Knew Too Much: And Other Stories (1922) is a book of detective stories by English writer G. K. Chesterton, published in 1922 by Cassell and Company in the United Kingdom, and Harper Brothers in the United States. It contains eight connected short stories about "The Man Who Knew Too Much", and unconnected stories featuring other heroes/detectives. The United States edition contains one of these additional stories: "The Trees of Pride", while the United Kingdom edition contains "Trees of Pride" and three shorter stories: "The Garden of Smoke", "The Five of Swords" and "The Tower of Treason".

== First publication ==
The stories were first published in Harper's Monthly Magazine between April 1920 and June 1922:

- April 1920: "The Face in the Target" ( vol. 140, April 1920, pp. 577–587)
- August 1920: "II. The Vanishing Prince, A Story" (August 1920, pp. 320–330)
- September 1920: "III. The Soul of the Schoolboy" (v. 141, Sept. 1920, pp. 512–521)
- March 1921: "IV. The Bottomless Well" (v. 142, March 1921, pp. 504–514)
- June 1921: "V. The Fad of the Fisherman" (June 1921, pp. 9–20)
- October 1921: "VI. The Hole in the Wall" (v. 143, Oct. 1921, pp. 572–586)
- May 1922: "VII. The Temple of Silence" (v. 144, May 1922, pp. 783–798)
- June 1922: "The Vengeance of the Statue" (v. 145, June 1922, pp. 10–22)

== Other stories in the book ==
Other stories that were added in the book:

1. "The Trees of Pride"
2. "The Garden of Smoke" (U.K. edition only)
3. "The Five of Swords" (U.K. edition only)
4. "The Tower of Treason" (U.K. edition only)

== The Man Who Knew Too Much stories ==
Horne Fisher, "The Man Who Knew Too Much", is the protagonist of the first eight stories. In the final story, "The Vengeance of the Statue", Fisher notes: "The Prime Minister is my father's friend. The Foreign Minister married my sister. The Chancellor of the Exchequer is my first cousin." Because of these intimate relationships with the leading political figures in the land, Fisher knows too much about the private politics behind the public politics of the day. This knowledge is a burden to him in the eight stories, because he is able to uncover the injustices and corruptions of the murders in each story, but in most cases the real killer gets away with the killing because to bring him openly to justice would create a greater chaos: starting a war, reinciting Irish rebellions or removing public faith in the government.

In the seventh story, "The Fad of the Fisherman", the Prime Minister himself is the murderer, who kills the financier whose country house he is visiting because the financier is trying to start a war with Sweden over "the Danish ports". By killing his host, the Prime Minister seeks to avoid a war in which many more people would die, and the financier would profit at the cost of thousands of lives.

In "The Vanishing Prince", an Irish rebel, Michael, is cornered in a tower, but a junior policeman named Wilson kills two senior police officers to be promoted in the field to become officer in charge of the case. He then tries to blame the two murders on the rebel to ensure he is hanged. The rebel, otherwise a gentleman, is enraged and shoots (but only wounds) Wilson. Fisher, however, is forced to arrest Michael: "Wilson recovered, and we managed to persuade him to retire. But we had to pension that damnable murderer more magnificently than any hero who ever fought for England. I managed to save Michael from the worst, but we had to send that perfectly innocent man to penal servitude for a crime we know he never committed; but it was only afterwards that we could connive in a sneakish way at his escape. And Sir Walter Carey is Prime Minister of this country, which he would probably never have been if the truth had been told of such a horrible scandal in his department. It might have done for us altogether in Ireland; it would certainly have done for him. And he is my father's oldest friend, and has always smothered me in kindness. I am too tangled up in the whole thing, you see, and I was certainly never born to set it right."

Fisher is accompanied in the stories by a political journalist, Harold March, but rather than being his "Watson", the stories are all written in the third person. Less a clumsy foil to reflect Fisher's brilliance, March is more of a sounding board for Fisher to discuss Chesterton's paradoxes and philosophy. Apart from the first story, in which March meets Fisher, and the final story, the stories have no internal chronology, and so can be read in any order.

The other four stories are similar in style and format to the main eight, as well as to Chesterton's Father Brown stories, but each is unconnected, with its own protagonist. All the stories are around 20 to 30 pages in length, except "The Trees of Pride", which is 67 pages long in the first edition, and divided into four chapters.

== Movies ==
The 1934 film and its 1956 remake have nothing except the title in common with this book. Alfred Hitchcock, who directed both films, decided to use the title because he held the film rights for some of the book's stories.

The 1979 Soviet movie The Face in the Target (Litso na misheni) was based partly on The Man Who Knew Too Much and partly on Chesterton's Father Brown mysteries.
