= Arasa Kattalai =

1967 film by M. G. Chakrapani

- Theatrical release poster
- Directed by: M. G. Chakrapani
- Screenplay by: R. M. Veerappan; Ve. Lakshmanan; S. K. T. Samy
- Produced by: M. C. Ramamoorthy
- Starring: M. G. Ramachandran; B. Saroja Devi
- Cinematography: A. Shanmugam
- Edited by: K. Narayanan
- Music by: K. V. Mahadevan
- Production company: Sathyaraja Pictures
- Release date: 19 May 1967
- Running time: 132 minutes
- Country: India
- Language: Tamil

Arasa Kattalai (transl. King's Order) is a 1967 Indian Tamil-language historical action film, written and directed by M. G. Chakrapani, starring M. G. Ramachandran and B. Saroja Devi, with Jayalalithaa, M. N. Nambiar and S. A. Ashokan in supporting roles. It was released on 19 May 1967.

== Plot ==
A monarch believes that he has committed a terrible fault and commits suicide to make amends, not without having indicated his successor: Vijayan, a man of the people, that one who had come to punish him, a fearless knight, for an act of bravery. Before dying, the monarch orders Vijayan to protect his subjects and to put back the power into the hands of the people. By so acting, the deceased king had also just thwarted the Machiavellian intentions of its Minister. Indeed, this traitor intends to seize the throne. But it will be for another time, because this sinister dignitary is going to make every effort to sabotage the reforms of Vijayan. To begin with, by eliminating him.

== Cast ==
- M. G. Ramachandran as Vijayan
- B. Saroja Devi as Amala
- Jayalalithaa as Moghana
- S. A. Ashokan as Vilavan
- M. N. Nambiar as Amudha's guardian
- R. S. Manohar as the perfidious minister
- Nagesh as the tribal leader
- P. S. Veerappa (guest-star) as the King of the Kumari
- K. R. Ramasamy as the patriot with the flag (guest star)
- N. S. Natarajan as a tribal
- Kundumani as a rustic fellow
- Madhavi as Jambha

== Production ==
The film initially began under the title Bhavani, which was written by A. K. Velan and was to be directed by Masthan. M. G. Ramachandran's brother Chakrapani produced this film, which got shelved after some progress. Chakrapani later revived this film as Arasa Kattalai, with Ramachandran returning to star. Apart from directing, Chakrapani made a cameo appearance in the film. Jayalalithaa earned the title "Kavarchi Kanni" through this film. The film's original climax, which had already been shot, reportedly featured Vijayan (M. G. Ramachandran) marrying Amudha (B. Saroja Devi), while Moghana (Jayalalitha) renounced worldly life and became a monk. However, following the fallout between MGR and Saroja Devi, the climax was altered shortly before the film's release. In the revised ending, Amudha was killed off, and Manickam was instead shown ending up with Moghana. "Arasa Kattalai" happened to be the last and 26th time MGR paired with Saroja Devi. In some ways, Saroja Devi passed on the baton to Jayalalithaa.

== Soundtrack ==
Soundtrack was composed by K. V. Mahadevan. The songs "Aadi Vaa" and "Vettaiyadu Vilayaadu" became chartbusters.

Track listing
No.	Title	Lyrics	Singer(s)	Length
1.	"Aadiva Aadiva"	N. M. Muthukkoothan	T. M. Soundararajan	3:29
2.	"Ennai Paadavaithavan"	Vaali	P. Susheela	3:22
3.	"Mugathai Paarthathillai"	Alangudi Somu	T. M. Soundararajan, P. Susheela	3:23
4.	"Pan Paadum"	Vaali	P. Susheela	3:24
5.	"Putham Pudhiya"	Vaali	T. M. Soundararajan, P. Susheela	3:14
6.	"Vettaiyadu Vilaiyaadu"	Alangudi Somu	T. M. Soundararajan, P. Susheela	5:47
7.	"Yethannai Kaalam"	N. M. Muthukkoothan	P. Susheela	3:09
Total length:				25:48

== Release and reception ==
Arasa Kattalai was released on 19 May 1967. The film ran for 10 weeks in theatres, and was not commercially successful. Kalki said the film, despite its flaws, would satisfy Ramachandran's fans.

== In popular culture ==
The song "Vettaiyadu Vilayadu" inspired Gautham Vasudev Menon to title his 2006 film of the same name.

The opening lines of "Aadiva Aadiva" is sung by Bannerjee (Vadivelu) in the last scene of the film Aadhavan (2009), as praise of the eponymous hero played by Suriya. Interestingly, this also serves as a subtle, affectionate reference to B. Saroja Devi, who featured in the original song, and whose appearance in Aadhavan would go on to be her final Tamil film.
