= Rajakumari (1947 film) =

- Theatrical release poster
- Directed by: A. S. A. Sami
- Written by: A. S. A. Sami
- Starring: M. G. Ramachandran; K. Malathi
- Cinematography: W. R. Subba Rao; U. Krishnan
- Edited by: D. Durairaj
- Music by: S. M. Subbaiah Naidu
- Production company: Jupiter Pictures
- Distributed by: Jupiter Pictures
- Release date: 11 April 1947
- Running time: 134 minutes
- Country: India
- Language: Tamil
- Box office: ₹40 Lakhs

Rajakumari (transl. Princess) is a 1947 Indian Tamil language film directed by A. S. A. Sami, starring M. G. Ramachandran (credited as Ramachandar) and K. Malathi. It was released on 11 April 1947.

== Plot ==
Sukumar (M. G. Ramachandran), a brave and kind-hearted young man from a humble background, lives in a kingdom ruled by a powerful monarch. Despite his modest origins, Sukumar is admired for his valor, integrity, and unwavering sense of justice. His life takes a dramatic turn when he encounters Princess Mallika (K. Malathi), the daughter of the king. Their meeting sparks a deep and sincere love, but their romance is threatened by rigid class divisions and palace intrigue.

The kingdom is under the shadow of a cunning sorcerer (S. V. Sahasranamam), who, along with his disciples, manipulates events to maintain control and sow discord. The sorcerer’s son (T. S. Durairaj) is also infatuated with Mallika and conspires to eliminate Sukumar. As tensions rise, Sukumar is forced to prove his worth through a series of trials—both physical and emotional—designed to test his courage, loyalty, and love.

With the help of allies like Nallan (M. R. Swaminathan) and the wisdom of elders, Sukumar navigates the treacherous landscape of palace intrigue, magical deception, and societal prejudice. Mallika, torn between duty and love, stands firm in her support for Sukumar, defying expectations and risking her royal status.

The climax unfolds in a dramatic confrontation between Sukumar and the sorcerer’s forces, where truth, love, and justice triumph over manipulation and tyranny. The film ends with the union of Sukumar and Mallika, symbolizing the victory of emotional integrity over class barriers and the restoration of harmony in the kingdom.

== Cast ==
Male cast

- M. G. Ramachandar as Sukumar
- T. S. Balaiah as Aalahalan
- M. R. Swaminathan as the sorcerer
- S. V. Subbaiah as Mallika's father
- M. N. Nambiar as Bahu
- Pulimoottai Ramasami as the sorcerer's disciple
- T. E. Ramasamy Iyer as the sorcerer's disciple
- M. R. Madhavan as Nallan
- Narayana Pillai as Paambaatti

Female cast

- K. Malathi as Mallika
- K. Thavamani Devi as Visharani
- M. Sivabhagyam as Bahuni
- M. M. Radha Bai as Sukumar's mother
- C. K. Saraswathi as Anjalai
- R. Malathi as a dancer

== Production ==
Jupiter Pictures partner Somu asked A. S. A. Sami to create a screenplay that he himself could direct with artistes on the payroll of the company. However, when he read Sami's screenplay, he suggested that P. U. Chinnappa and T. R. Rajakumari, who were in the forefront at that time, play the lead roles. But Sami requested Somu to stick to the original decision. M. G. Ramachandran (then credited as Ramachandar) and Malathi were asked to play the lead roles. After more than half the film was shot, the company's other partner S. K. Mohideen felt the project be abandoned. Somu weighed the consequences in the light of future career of Sami and Ramachandar. He told his partner that a decision could be taken on completion of the film.

Rajakumari was Ramachandar's 15th film and first film as leading actor. Sami arranged for a wrestler called Kamaludeen to participate in a fight sequence for the film. But Ramachandar insisted to have Sandow M. M. A. Chinnappa Thevar who had been acting in small roles to do the role. At first director was not interested to have him in the film, but later agreed. K. Thavamani Devi who was a talented dancer and singer played the role of a vamp. At one point she came for shooting wearing a dress with a plunging neckline (something unseen those days). It caused ripples on the set. For a scene, where Nambiar who becomes invisible and follows Swaminathan, Sami revealed it was inspired from The Invisible Man.

== Soundtrack ==
Music was composed by S. M. Subbaiah Naidu, while the lyrics were penned by Udumalai Narayana Kavi.

No.	Song	Singer/s	Length
1	"Vaazhvom Vaazhvom"		02:12
2	"Kannara Kaanpadhenro"	M. M. Mariyappa	02:09
3	"Maaran Avadhaaram"	M. M. Mariyappa	03:15
4	"Maamayilena Nadamaaduraal"	M. M. Mariyappa	03:06
5	"Neyramithe Nalla .. Sukumaaran"	K. V. Janaki	02:13
6	"Paampaatti Chiththanaye"		02:59
7	"Paattil Enna Solven Paangi"	T. V. Rathnam & K. V. Janaki	03:27
8	"Thirumuga Ezhilai Thirudi Kondathu"	M. M. Mariyappa & K. Malathi	02:53
9	"Kaattinile Naangal Vazhvadhe"	Thiruchi Loganathan & K. V. Janaki	03:27
10	"Anbin Perumai"	M. M. Mariyappa & K. V. Janaki	03:11

== Reception ==
Rajakumari turned out to be a blockbuster, earning huge profits to the production company, and was the highest-grossing Tamil film of the year. In 2008, film historian Randor Guy, an ardent fan of Ramachandran, said it would be "Remembered for: the debut of M. G. Ramachandran as hero and A. S. A. Sami as director.
