= B. Saroja Devi filmography =

Filmography

This is filmography of B. Saroja Devi, who has acted in Tamil, Kannada, Telugu, and Hindi films. Around half of her films are Tamil films in addition to Kannada, Telugu and Hindi films.

== Filmography ==
=== Tamil ===
Year	Film	Role	Note
1957	Thangamalai Ragasiyam	Yavanamohini	Tamil debut
1958	Bhooloka Rambai		Special appearance in the song "Thean Pole Thedi Vaa"
1958	Sengottai Singam		25th Film
1958	Thedi Vantha Selvam	Nimmi	
1958	Thirumanam		
1958	Illarame Nallaram	Sarala	
1958	Nadodi Mannan	Rathna	First movie starred along with MGR
1958	Manamulla Maruthaaram	Usha	
1958	Engal Kudumbam Perisu	Radha	
1958	Sabaash Meena	Malathi	
1959	Bhaaga Pirivinai	Ponni	
1959	Kalyana Parisu	Vasanthi	
1959	Koodi Vazhnthal Kodi Nanmai		
1959	Odi Vilaiyadu Papa		
1959	President Panchatcharam		
1959	Vaazha Vaitha Deivam	Kaveri	
1960	Ellorum Innaattu Mannar	Kanchanamala	
1960	Yanai Paagan	Leela	
1960	Irumbu Thirai	Malathi	
1960	Kairasi	Sumathi	
1960	Parthiban Kanavu	Kamali	Guest Appearance
1960	Vidivelli	Chithra	
1961	Manapanthal	Suguna	
1961	Thirudadhe	Savithri	
1961	Palum Pazhamum	Shanthi/Neela	
1961	Thaai Sollai Thattadhe	Vijaya	
1961	Panithirai	Sakunthala/Lakshmi	
1962	Kudumba Thalaivan	Seetha	
1962	Aadi Perukku	Padma	
1962	Asthikkoru Aanum Asaikku Oru Ponnum		
1962	Valar Pirai	Saraswathi	
1962	Paasam	Manju	
1962	Paarthal Pasi Theerum	Saroja	
1962	Maadappura	Meena	
1962	Aalayamani	Meena	
1962	Tháyai Kátha Thanayan	Maragatham	
1963	Iruvar Ullam	Shantha	50th Film
1963	Periya Idathu Penn	Punitha	
1963	Kulamagal Radhai	Radhai	
1963	Panathottam	Kala	
1963	Dharmam Thalai Kaakkum	Sivagami	
1963	Needhikkuppin Paasam	Gowri	
1963	Kalyaniyin Kanavan	Kalyani	
1964	Vazhkai Vazhvatharke	Valli	
1964	Panakkara Kudumbam	Rani	
1964	Thaayin Madiyil	Jeeva	
1964	Padagotti	Muthazhagi	
1964	Dheiva Thaai	Mekala	
1964	Pasamum Nesamum	Shanthi	
1964	Puthiya Paravai	Latha	
1964	En Kadamai	Sarasu	
1965	Enga Veettu Pillai	Leela	
1965	Aasai Mugam	Selvi	
1965	Kalangarai Vilakkam	Neela/Malliga	Dual Role
1966	Anbe Vaa	Geetha	
1966	Naan Aanaiyittal	Kannagi/Kaveri	
1966	Nadodi	Radha	
1966	Thaali Bhagyam	Valli	
1966	Parakkum Paavai	Kala	
1966	Petralthan Pillaiya	Mohini	
1967	Arasa Kattalai	Amudha/Amala	Last pairing with MGR
1967	Pen Endral Pen	Usha	100th Film
1968	Panama Pasama	Shanthi	
1968	En Thambi	Radha	
1968	Thamarai Nenjam	Kamala	
1969	Anbalippu	Valli	
1969	Thangamalar	Ganga	125th Film
1969	Anjal Petti 520	Saratha	
1969	Aindhu Laksham	Krishnadevi	
1969	Kula Vilakku	Kannamma	Tamil Nadu State Film Award for Best Actress
1969	Odum Nadhi	Chithra	
1970	Malathi	Malathi	
1970	Kann Malar	Valli	
1970	Snegithi	Rani	
1971	Uyir		
1971	Thenum Paalum	Thangam	
1971	Arunodhayam	Shanthi	
1972	Shakthi Leelai	Renuka Devi	
1974	Paththu Matha Bandham	Vasanthi	
1974	Sri Chamundeeswari Mahimai		
1978	llaiamman		
1988	Poovukkul Boogambam		
1988	Oray Thaai Oray Kulam		
1988	Thaimel Aanai		
1989	Dharma Devan		150th Film
1989	Ponmana Selvan		
1993	Paarambariyam	Meenakshi	
1997	Once More	Shantha	
2009	Aadhavan	Rajalakshmi	

=== Kannada ===
Year	Film	Role	Note
1955	Mahakavi Kalidasa	Vidyadhare	Kannada debut
1955	Sri Rama Pooja		
1955	Aashaadhabhooti		
1956	Kacha Devayani	Goddess Devayani	
1956	Kokilavani		
1956	Pancharathna		
1957	Chintamani		
1957	Rathnagiri Rahasya	Yavanamohini	
1958	Anna Thangi	Belli	
1958	Bhookailasa		
1958	School Master	Radha	
1959	Jagajyothi Basveshwara		
1961	Kittur Chennamma	Rani Chennamma	
1961	Vijayanagarada Veeraputhra		
1962	Devasundari		
1964	Amarashilpi Jakanachari	Manjari	
1965	Beratha Jeeva	Sudha/Leela	Dual Role
1969	Mallammana Pavaada	Mallammaa	
1970	Lakshmi Saraswathi	Saraswathi/Lakshmi	Dual Role
1971	Purnima		
1971	Thande Makkalu		
1971	Papa Punya		
1971	Sri Krishna Rukmini Satyabhama	Satyabhama/Rukmini	Dual Role
1971	Nyayave Devaru		
1973	Sahadharmini	Nirmala/Urmila Devi	Dual Role
1974	Chamundeswarei Mahemai		
1974	Sri Srinivasa Kalyana	Goddess Lakshmi	
1974	Gruhini		
1975	Shani Prabhava		
1975	Bhagya Jyothi		
1976	Katha Sangama		
1976	Chiranjeevi		
1977	Babruvahana	Chitrangade	
1977	Sri Renukadevi Mahathme	Goddess Renukadevi	
1977	Bhagyavantharu	Parvathi	
1980	Guru Sarvabhowma Sri Raghavendra Karune		
1981	Nammina Thayi Annamma		
1983	Rudranaga		
1984	Guru Bhakthi		
1984	Thai Thande		
1984	Yarivanu		
1985	Thayi Tande	Girija	
1988	Ladies Hostel	Suguna	
1989	Guru		
1990	Bhale Chatura		
1994	Mahashakti Maye		175th Film
1994	Emergency		
1995	Anuraga Sangama	Dr. Vasanthi	
1995	Putmalli		
1996	Agni IPS		
1997	Janani Janmabhoomi		
1998	Mangala Sootra		
2007	Thimma		
2007	Prarambha	School Principal	Documentary
2019	Natasaarvabhowma	Herself	Cameo

=== Telugu ===
Year	Film	Role	Note
1957	Panduranga Mahatyam	Kalavati	Telugu debut
1958	Bhooloka Rambha		Special appearance in the song "Guma Gumalade Puvvula"
1958	Bhookailas	Parvati	
1959	Pelli Sandadi	Priyamwadha	
1960	Pelli Kanuka	Vasanthi	
1961	Intiki Deepam Illale	Suguna	
1961	Jagadeka Veeruni Katha	Jayanthi/Indra Kumari	
1961	Sri Seetha Rama Kalyanam	Mandodari	
1963	Manchi Chedu	Manju	
1963	Sri Krishnarjuna Yuddhamu	Subhadra	
1964	Dagudu Moothalu	Subbulu	
1964	Aathma Balam	Jaya	
1964	Amarasilpi Jakkanna	Manjari	
1965	Prameelarjuneeyam	Prameela	
1966	Shakuntala	Shakuntala	
1967	Rahasyam	Kumari	
1968	Bhagya Chakramu	Paapa	
1968	Uma Chandi Gowri Sankarula Katha	Uma/Chandi/Gauri	Triple Role
1970	Vijayam Manade	Padmini Devi	
1970	Mayani Mamata	Jyothi	
1972	Pandanti Kapuram	Shobha	
1972	Matrimoorti		
1974	Manushullo Devudu	Shanti	
1975	Sri Ramanjaneya Yuddham	Sita	
1977	Seetha Rama Vanavasam	Mandodari	
1977	Daana Veera Soora Karna	Vrishali	
1984	Ugra Naagu		
1990	Yama Dharma Raju		
1991	Alludu Diddina Kapuram	Ganga	
1992	Samrat Ashoka	Karmani	
2005	Devi Abhayam		

=== Hindi ===
Year	Film	Role	Note
1959	Paigham	Malti	Hindi debut
1961	Sasural	Bela	
1961	Opera House	Saroj	
1962	Hong Kong	Sarathadevi	
1963	Pareeksha		
1963	Pyaar Kiya To Darna Kya	Savita	
1964	Beti Bete	Seeta	
1964	Dooj Ka Chand	Rama	
1966	Preet Na Jane Reet	Kavita	
1967	Dilwaar	Radhika	
1972	Hari Darshan	Maharani Kayadhu	

== TV shows ==
Year	Shows	Role	Language	Channel
2019	Mahanadigai Keerthysuresh	Guest	Tamil	Zee Tamil
2020	Kodeeswari	Participant	Tamil	Colors Tamil
