= List of Telugu films of 1970 =

This is a list of films produced by the Tollywood (Telugu language film industry) based in Hyderabad in the year 1970.

Title	Director	Cast	Notes
Akhandudu	V. Ramachandra Rao	Krishna, Bharathi, Prabhakar Reddy	
Akka Chellelu	A. Sanjeevi	Akkineni Nageshwara Rao, Sowcar Janaki, Vijaya Nirmala, Krishna	
Ali Baba 40 Dongalu	B. Vittalacharya	NTR, Jayalalitha	
Amma Kosam	B. V. Prasad	Krishnam Raju, Anjali Devi, Krishna Ghattamaneni	
Balaraju Katha	Bapu	Master Prabhakar, Nagabhushanam, Suryakantham	
Chitti Chellelu	M. Krishnan Nair	NTR, Vanisri, Rajasree	
Desamante Manushuloyi	C. S. Rao	Sobhan Babu, S. V. Ranga Rao	
Dharma Daata	Sanjeevi	Akkineni Nageshwara Rao, Kanchana	
Drohi	K. Bapayya	Jaggayya, Vanisree	Suresh Productions
Jai Jawan	D. Yoganand	Akkineni Nageshwara Rao, Varalakshmi, Bharathi	
Kathanayika Molla	Basavaraju Venkata Padmanabha Rao	Vanisree, Haranath, B. Padmanabham, Shobhan Babu	
Kodalu Diddina Kapuram	D. Yoganand	NTR, Savitri, Vanisri	
Lakshmi Kataksham	B. Vittalacharya	NTR, K. R. Vijaya, Rajasri	
Maa Manchi Akkayya		K. R. Vijaya	
Maa Nanna Nirdhoshi	K. V. Nandana Rao	Krishna, Vijaya Nirmala, Baby Sridevi	
Malli Pelli	C. S. Rao	Krishna, Krishnam Raju, Vijaya Nirmala	
Marina Manishi	C. S. Rao	NTR, Vijaya Nirmala	
Maro Prapancham	Adhuruthi Subbarao	Akkineni Nageshwara Rao, Savitri, Gummadi	
Mayani Mamata	Kamalakara Kameshwara Rao	NTR, B. Saroja Devi, Sobhan Babu	
Merupu Veerudu	B. Harinarayana	Kanta Rao, Rajasri	
Oke Kutumbham	A. Bhimsingh	NTR, Lakshmi, Kanta Rao	
Pelli Koothuru	V. Ramachandra Rao	Krishnam Raju, Sowcar Janaki	
Pelli Sambandham	K. Varaprasad Rao	Krishna Ghattamaneni, Vanisree, Krishnam Raju	
Pettandarulu	C. S. Rao	NTR, Savitri	
Sambarala Rambabu	Sheshagiri Rao	Chalam, Sharada, Allu Ramalingaiah	
Thaali Bottu	T. Madhusudhan Rao	Krishna Ghattamaneni, Vijaya Nirmala	
Thalla? Pellama?	NTR	NTR, Chandrakala, Shanta Kumari, Harikrishna	
Vidhi Vilasam	Tapi Chanakya	Krishna, Vijaya Nirmala, Relangi, Vijayalalitha, Nagabhushanam	
Vijayam Manade	B. Vittalacharya	NTR, B. Saroja Devi	
