= Life Is for Living =

Life Is for Living may refer to

- Life... Is for Living, an album by Sherbet
- "Life Is for Living", a song by Coldplay from Parachutes
- "Life Is for Living", a song by Barclay James Harvest
- Vazhkai Vazhvatharke, an Indian film known in English as Life Is for Living
