= Maruti Rao =

Maruti Rao may refer to:

- S. Maruti Rao, an Indian cinematographer who worked mainly in Tamil films.
- Marutirao Parab, an Indian actor and director best known for playing comic roles in Hindi films.
