= NTR National Award =

Award presented by the Government of Andhra Pradesh

- Awarded for: Lifetime achievements and contributions to Indian cinema
- Country: India
- Presented by: Government of Andhra Pradesh
- Reward: ₹500,000/-
- First award: 1996
- Website: apsftvtdc.in/index.html

The NTR National Award is an annual award presented by the government of Andhra Pradesh to recognize lifetime achievements and contributions to the Cinema of India. The award is named after N. T. Rama Rao, actor and former politician who served as the Chief Minister of Andhra Pradesh. The award carries a cash prize of ₹ 500,000 and a memento.

== Recipients ==
The recipients of the awards are as follows:

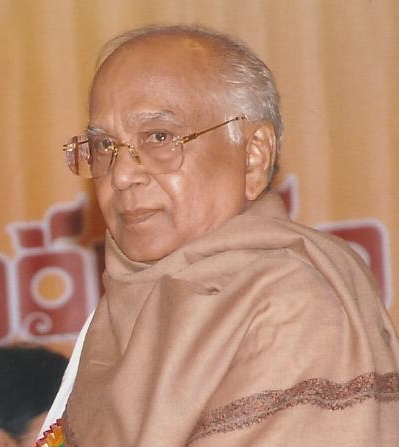
The first recipient: Akkineni Nageswara Rao

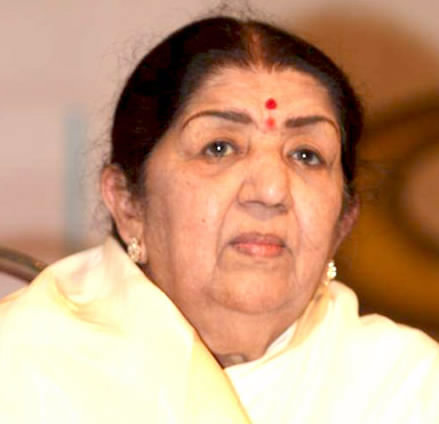
The first woman recipient: Lata Mangeshkar

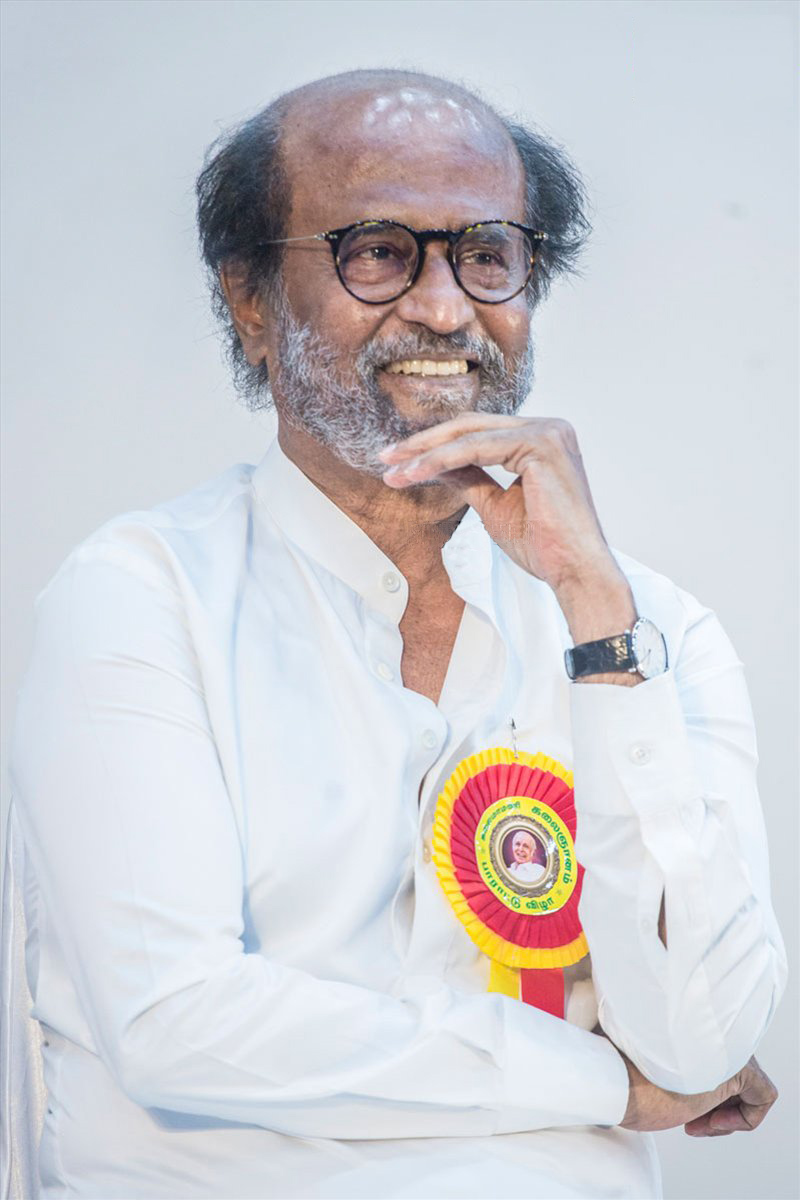
A recent recipient: Rajinikanth

- 1996: Akkineni Nageswara Rao
- 1997: Dilip Kumar
- 1998: Sivaji Ganesan
- 1999: Lata Mangeshkar
- 2000: Bhanumathi Ramakrishna
- 2001: Hrishikesh Mukherjee
- 2002: Dr. Rajkumar
- 2003: Ghattamaneni Krishna
- 2004: Ilayaraja
- 2005: Ambareesh
- 2006: Waheeda Rehman
- 2007: Dasari Narayana Rao
- 2008: Jamuna
- 2009: B. Saroja Devi
- 2010: Sharada
- 2011: Amitabh Bachchan
- 2012: S. P. Balasubrahmanyam
- 2013: Hema Malini. V. Ravichandran
- 2014: Kamal Haasan
- 2015: K. Raghavendra Rao
- 2016: Rajinikanth
- 2024: Nandamuri Bala Krishna
- 2025: Chiranjeevi
