= Ramudu Bheemudu =

- Theatrical release poster
- Directed by: Tapi Chanakya
- Story by: D. V. Narasa Raju
- Produced by: D. Ramanaidu
- Starring: N. T. Rama Rao; Jamuna; L. Vijayalakshmi
- Cinematography: Annayya
- Edited by: K. A. Marthand
- Music by: Pendyala
- Production company: Suresh Productions
- Release date: 21 May 1964
- Country: India
- Language: Telugu

Ramudu Bheemudu is a 1964 Indian Telugu-language film directed by Tapi Chanakya. It was produced by D. Ramanaidu under the Suresh Productions banner. It stars N. T. Rama Rao, Jamuna and L. Vijayalakshmi, with music composed by Pendyala. The film was a major box office success.

The film was the debut of D. Rama Naidu's Suresh Productions banner into the film industry and it is N. T. Rama Rao's first dual role film. Satyanarayana was body double for N. T. Rama Rao in climax scenes. The film is considered a trendsetting venture and became an inspiration for later films with similar storyline. Chanakya remade the film in Tamil as Enga Veettu Pillai (1965). It was also remade in Hindi as Ram Aur Shyam (1967), in Malayalam as Ajayanum Vijayanum (1976) and Kannada as Mojugara Sogasugara (1995).

== Plot ==
Ramudu is a wealthy but naive and timid sole heir who is constantly controlled and tortured by his malicious brother-in-law, Panakala Rao. Deeply unhappy, Ramudu craves nothing more than the genuine affection of his loving sister, Susheela, and his young nephew, Ravi.

Meanwhile, Bhimudu is a brave, energetic village youth who looks exactly like Ramudu. He lives with his mother, Venkamma, but has a deep passion for acting in stage plays. After getting heavily scolded by his mother for his theatrical antics, Bhimudu decides to run away from home.

At the same time, Panakala Rao arranges a wealthy marriage alliance for Ramudu entirely to serve his own greedy self-interests. However, Leela, the daughter of a wealthy man named Ranganatham, quickly rejects the match after realizing how weak-willed and fearful Ramudu is.

== Cast ==
- N. T. Rama Rao as Ramudu & Bheemudu (dual role)
- Jamuna as Leela
- L. Vijayalakshmi as Santha
- S. V. Ranga Rao as Ranganatham
- Rajanala as Panakala Rao
- Relangi as Jayaram
- Ramana Reddy as Sarabhayya
- Mikkilineni as Director Somayya
- Raavi Kondala Rao as Registrar
- D. Ramanaidu as Lawyer (cameo)
- Santha Kumari as Suseela
- Rushyendramani as Venkamma
- Suryakantham as Sundaramma
- Hemalata as Nainamma
- Girija as Kamala
- Kuchala Kumari as Dancer (Song Undile Manchi Kalam)

== Production ==
=== Development ===
D. V. Narasaraju originally prepared a folkloric story based on a concept of two identical looking persons interchanging places loosely inspired from American film The Prisoner of Zenda (1952). He had originally written the script for producer Midde Jagannatha Rao with Kamalakara Kameswara Rao directing the film. However both the producer and director had doubts over the subject as similar film Nadodi Mannan (1958) in Tamil made on this subject could be dubbed in Telugu thus dropped the idea of producing the film.

Narasaraju then came across a novel Scapegoat, a social drama which had a similar plot and decided to change the genre of his script from folklore to social drama which eventually became Ramudu Bheemudu. Midde and Kamalakara were impressed with the plot and decided to do this film with Akkineni Nageswara Rao who refused as he was busy with Iddaru Mithrulu (1961) which also featured him in dual roles and Midde shelved the film.

Narasaraju then narrated the script to Ramanaidu who agreed to produce the film. It became his first independent film to be produced by him after his previous venture Anuragam which he co-produced became a below average grosser. Both Narasaraju and Ramanaidu narrated this script to N. T. Rama Rao who agreed to act in the film thus becoming the first film to feature him in dual roles.

=== Filming ===
The film's shoot began on 16 November at Vauhini Studios. Two songs "Desamu Marindale" and "Taluku Talukumani" were picturised at Nagarjunasagar. The former was shot among thousand construction workers while latter was shot at River View Guest House. The rest of the filming was held at Vauhini Studios, Kodambakkam and other surrounding areas.

== Soundtrack ==
Music was composed by Pendyala.

Song title	Lyrics	Singers	length
"Undile Manchi Kalam"	Sri Sri	Ghantasala, P. Susheela	4:59
"Saradaa Saradaa Cigarette"	Kosaraju	Madhavapeddi Satyam, K. Jamuna Rani	3:36
"Telisindile Telisindile"	C. Narayana Reddy	Ghantasala, P. Susheela	3:37
"Thaguna Idi Mama"	Kosaraju	Ghantasala, Madhavapeddi Satyam	3:54
"Ade Ade"	C. Narayana Reddy	Ghantasala, P. Susheela	4:18
"Desammu Maarindoy"	Kosaraju	Ghantasala, P. Susheela	4:28
"Po Mama Pommikan"	Kosaraju	Ghantasala	3:26
"Thaluku Thaluku"	C. Narayana Reddy	Ghantasala, P. Susheela	3:27
