= Adhyapika =

Adhyaapika
- Directed by: P. Subramaniam
- Written by: Kanam E. J.
- Screenplay by: Kanam E. J.
- Produced by: P. Subramaniam
- Starring: Madhu; Thikkurissy Sukumaran Nair; Vaikkam Mani; Ambika
- Cinematography: E. N. C. Nair
- Edited by: N. Gopalakrishnan
- Music by: V. Dakshinamoorthy
- Production company: Neela Productions
- Distributed by: Neela Productions
- Release date: 27 September 1968
- Country: India
- Language: Malayalam

Adhyaapika (transl. Teacher) is a 1968 Indian Malayalam-language film, directed and produced by P. Subramaniam. The film stars Madhu, Thikkurissy Sukumaran Nair, Vaikkam Mani and Ambika. The film had musical score by V. Dakshinamoorthy. The film was remade in Tamil as Kulavilakku (1969).

== Plot ==
Saramma, a dedicated middle-class lady schoolteacher, selflessly sacrifices her own happiness to support her father and two ungrateful siblings. Her family repeatedly exploits her financial stability—her brother refuses any family responsibilities after finishing his education, her father actively prevents her marriage out of fear of losing her income, and the only man she loves ends up marrying her sister instead.

Saramma is left heartbroken, neglected, and lonely because of her situation. Eventually, she contracts tuberculosis and passes away. She is left with no one to love her in her final days except her faithful pet dog.

== Cast ==
- Madhu
- Thikkurissy Sukumaran Nair
- Vaikkam Mani
- Padmini
- Aranmula Ponnamma
- Babysree
- Bahadoor
- Ittan
- Joseph Chacko
- Kottarakkara Sreedharan Nair
- Leela
- Master Venu
- Meena
- Padmini
- Piravam Mary
- Ramachandran
- Ramakrishna
- S. P. Pillai
- K. V. Shanthi
- Sobha
- T. K. Balachandran
- Vanakkutty

== Soundtrack ==
The music was composed by V. Dakshinamoorthy.

No.	Song	Singers	Lyrics	Length (m:ss)
1	"Aathira Raavile"	K. J. Yesudas, P. Susheela	O. N. V. Kurup	
2	"Agnikireedamaninjavale"	K. J. Yesudas	O. N. V. Kurup	
3	"Kanya Nandana"	P. Leela	O. N. V. Kurup	
4	"Maavupoothu"	P. Leela, Kalyani Menon, Renuka, Padma	O. N. V. Kurup	
5	"Manassinullile Mayipeeli" (Rajakumari)	P. Leela	O. N. V. Kurup	
6	"Mannidam Pazhayoru"	Kamukara	O. N. V. Kurup	
7	"Nirdaya Lokam"	K. J. Yesudas	O. N. V. Kurup	
8	"Pallimanikale"	P. Leela, Chorus, Renuka	O. N. V. Kurup	
9	"Swapnasundari"	K. J. Yesudas	O. N. V. Kurup	

== Awards ==
- National Film Awards1968
  - President's silver medal for Best Malayalam film.
