= Manamulla Maruthaaram =

- Theatrical release poster
- Directed by: W. R. Subba Rao; M. S. Ramnath
- Screenplay by: Murasoli Maran
- Story by: Pandit Mukhram Sharma
- Starring: K. Balaji; B. Saroja Devi
- Cinematography: W. R. Subba Rao
- Edited by: R. Devarajan
- Music by: K. V. Mahadevan
- Production company: Padma Films
- Release date: 19 September 1958
- Country: India
- Language: Tamil

Manamulla Maruthaaram (transl. The Second Wife with the Good Heart) is a 1958 Indian Tamil-language film directed by W. R. Subba Rao, starring K. Balaji and B. Saroja Devi. It was released on 19 September 1958.

== Cast ==
List compiled from the database of Film News Anandan and from the film credits.

Dance

- Mohana
- Madhuri
- Shantha
- Eswar Lal

Featured Artistes

- K. Balaji
- K. A. Thangavelu
- Muthukrishnan
- Nagesh
- Sedhupathi
- Soundar
- Balu
- Govindan
- Sayeeram
- B. Saroja Devi
- T. P. Muthulakshmi
- Manorama
- C. T. Rajakantham
- Kumudhini
- Gamini
- Kalavathi
- Baby Premalatha
- Seetha
- Shanthakumari
- Kandhala Devi
- P. Susheela

== Production ==
The film was produced by Padma Films and was directed by M. S. Ramnath and W. R. Subba Rao who also handled the Cinematography. Murasoli Maran wrote the screenplay and dialogues for the original story by Pandit Mukhram Sharma. Art direction was by C. HE. Prasad Rao while the choreography was done by Sampath and Chinni Lal. R. P. Sarathy handled the still photography. The film was shot ast Bharani studios and processed at Madras Cine Lab.

== Soundtrack ==
Music was composed by K. V. Mahadevan, while the lyrics were penned by A. Maruthakasi.

Song	Singer/s	Length
"Thiruvilakku Veettuku Alankaaram"	Jikki	03:15
"Nellukkulle Arisi Irupadhu Avasiyam"	Jikki	02:44
"Inbamenge Inbamenge Endru Thedu"	Sirkazhi Govindarajan	03:39
"Aasai Kanavugale Sadhaavum"	Jikki, L. R. Eswari & Kasthuri	03:16
"Kaayile Inipadhenna"	A. M. Rajah & Jikki	02:26
"Thoondiyil Meenum Maattikichu"	K. Jamuna Rani	03:39
"Aadaatha Aattamellaam"	Sirkazhi Govindarajan & Jikki	03:26
"Kaalile Thandai Kalakalakka"	L. R. Eswari & Kasthuri	
"Vaanga Ammaa Vaanga Valaiyal"	S. C. Krishnan & L. R. Eswari	02:03
