= Ajayanum Vijayanum =

Malayalam film

- Directed by: J. Sasikumar
- Written by: Sreekumaran Thampi
- Screenplay by: Sreekumaran Thampi
- Story by: D. V. Narasa Raju
- Based on: Ramudu Bheemudu (Telugu)
- Produced by: K. N. S. Jaffarsha
- Starring: Prem Nazir; Sukumari; Kaviyoor Ponnamma; Lakshmi; Adoor Bhasi
- Cinematography: Melli Irani
- Edited by: K. Sankunni
- Music by: M. S. Viswanathan
- Production company: JS Films
- Distributed by: JS Films
- Release date: 24 December 1976
- Country: India
- Language: Malayalam

Ajayanum Vijayanum (transl. Ajay and Vijay) is a 1976 Indian Malayalam-language film, directed by J. Sasikumar and produced by K. N. S. Jaffarsha. The film stars Prem Nazir, Lakshmi, Sukumari, Kaviyoor Ponnamma and Adoor Bhasi. The film has musical score by M. S. Viswanathan. The movie is a remake of the 1964 Telugu movie Ramudu Bheemudu.

== Cast ==
- Prem Nazir as Ajay/Vijay
- Sukumari as Devaki
- Kaviyoor Ponnamma as Susheela
- Adoor Bhasi as Rajappan
- Thikkurissy Sukumaran Nair as Thampi
- Lakshmi as Nandini
- Sankaradi as Pilla
- Sreelatha Namboothiri as Sreekala
- Nilambur Balan
- Baby Sabitha as Mini
- K. P. Ummer as Godhavarma Raja
- Kunchan as Kutttan
- Meena as Vijayan's mother
- Radhika as Kalyani
- Surasu
- Vidhubala as Radhika

== Soundtrack ==
The music was composed by M. S. Viswanathan and the lyrics were written by Sreekumaran Thampi.

No.	Song	Singers	Lyrics	Length (m:ss)
1	"Aduthaal Adipaniyum"	K. J. Yesudas	Sreekumaran Thampi	
2	"Kadhakali Keli"	K. J. Yesudas	Sreekumaran Thampi	
3	"Neelakkarimbin"	P. Jayachandran, L. R. Eeswari	Sreekumaran Thampi	
4	"Pavizhamalli"	K. J. Yesudas	Sreekumaran Thampi	
5	"Varshameghame"	P. Susheela, Chorus	Sreekumaran Thampi	

== Reception ==
A critic from Free India found the theme of Tamil film to be well adapted to the traditions of Kerala, he praised the acting of Prem Nazir but felt Lakshmi was wasted.
