= Enga Veettu Pillai =

1965 film by Tapi Chanakya

- Theatrical release poster
- Directed by: Chanakya
- Screenplay by: Sakthi T. K. Krishnasamy
- Based on: Ramudu Bheemudu
- Produced by: Nagi Reddi; Chakrapani
- Starring: M. G. Ramachandran; B. Saroja Devi
- Cinematography: A. Vincent; P. N. Sundaram
- Edited by: C. P. Jambulingam
- Music by: Viswanathan–Ramamoorthy
- Production company: Vijaya Combines Productions
- Distributed by: Emgeeyaar Pictures
- Release date: 14 January 1965
- Running time: 183 minutes
- Country: India
- Language: Tamil

Enga Veettu Pillai (transl. The Son of Our House) is a 1965 Indian Tamil-language film written by Sakthi T. K. Krishnasamy and directed by Chanakya. A remake of his 1964 Telugu film Ramudu Bheemudu, it stars M. G. Ramachandran and B. Saroja Devi, with S. V. Ranga Rao, M. N. Nambiar, Rathna and Pandari Bai in supporting roles. The film is about two identical but contrasting twins who were separated at birth, and what happens when they cross paths.

Enga Veettu Pillai was produced by Nagi Reddi and Chakrapani. It was the second film to feature Ramachandran in two roles after Nadodi Mannan (1958). The cinematography was handled by A. Vincent, and editing by C. P. Jambulingam. The film was primarily shot at Vauhini Studios, and filming was completed within 45 days.

Enga Veettu Pillai was released by Emgeeyaar Pictures on 14 January 1965, Pongal Day, and emerged as a major box office success, running for over 25 weeks in theatres in Chennai, Coimbatore, Madurai, Thanjavur, Trichy and thereby becoming a silver jubilee film. It was also the first film to win Ramachandran, Best Actor awards from both the Madras Film Fans' and Filmgoer's Associations.

== Plot ==
Ramu is an innocent and cowardly man – the heir to all the riches of Poonjolai zamin. He was raised that way by his sister Susheela and her husband Gajendran. Ramu shivers at the very mention of his brother-in-law's name and a whiplash is Gajendran's favourite form of punishment. Gajendran wants to have Ramu marry Leela for her wealth and he demands dowry, but she is repulsed by his cowardice. Gajendran plans to take all of Ramu's wealth and expel him from the house. Ramu overhears this and runs away.

Ilango is a jobless young man, prone to pick a fight and for this reason, he causes trouble for his mother. Ilango chases a thief who steals Leela's purse and Leela takes him home mistaking him for Ramu. Ilango enjoys their attention and does not reveal his true identity to them.

Meanwhile, Santha, a village girl finds Ramu who is now unconscious due to hunger and brings him home to his mother. Ilango teaches a lesson to Gajendran while Ramu learns the ways of the world.

Gajendran is angered as Ilango interferes in factory matters and makes him powerless in front of the workers. He beats his wife, Susheela, accusing her of encouraging Ilango. A fight ensues between Ilango and Gajendran, Gajendran leaves the house with his sister and daughter, Meena.

Due to this, Susheela falls ill and Gajendran rejects Ilango's request to come home. Ilango decides to leave and reveal that he was not Ramu through a letter to Gajendran. Gajendran kidnaps Govindan, a friend of Ilango, and learns his whereabouts. Gajendran's goons kidnap Ramu, mistaking him for Ilango.

The rest of the story reveals that Ramu and Ilango are brothers who were separated in childhood during Panguni Uthiram in Palani. Ilango, born Lakshmanan, was adopted by a childless couple who renamed him Ilango. Ilango comes to rescue Ramu and after a fight Gajendran sees them together and has a change of heart.

The film ends with Ramu marrying Santha and Ilango marrying Leela, with the blessings of Gajendran and all family members.

== Cast ==
- M. G. Ramachandran as Ramu and Lakshmanan / Ilango
- B. Saroja Devi as Leela

Supporting actors

- S. V. Ranga Rao as Ranganathan Pillai, Leela's Father
- M. N. Nambiar as Gajendran
- K. A. Thangavelu as Malaiyappa
- Nagesh as Govindhan

Supporting actresses

- Rathna as Santha
- Pandari Bai as Susheela
- L. Vijayalakshmi as the main female dancer of "Kankalum Kaavadi..."
- Madhavi as Ranji
- Seethalakshmi as Gajendran's older sister, Perundevi
- Rushyendramani as Ilango's mother
- Baby Shakila as Meena
- Hemalatha as Grandmother of Ramu, Elango and Susheela

== Production ==
Enga Veettu Pillai was a remake of the 1964 Telugu film Ramudu Bheemudu. Tapi Chanakya who directed the Telugu version has also directed Tamil version. Sakthi Krishnaswamy wrote the dialogues for the film. A. Vincent was recruited as the director of photography and C. P. Jambulingam edited the film. This was the second film to feature M. G. Ramachandran in dual roles after 1958's Nadodi Mannan. The dual roles consists of a scared heir and a brave man.

The makers were set deadline by producers to complete the film within 45 days to release it in time for the festive occasion of Pongal. Sets were erected in all the floors at Vauhini Studios. For the scene involving both Ramachandrans who cross each other, Vincent used lighting mask technique to shoot the scene.

Once during the shooting, the director found the actors struggling with the words, the director asked Sakthi's assistant to change the words, despite Ramachandran warning him not to. Sakthi heard this, came to him took the dialogue papers, tore them and walked away saying no one can change his dialogues. Ramachandran who watched all this with a smile called the director and told him to go to the writer's house to apologise. Sakthi came back and wrote dialogues that were agreeable to all.

Wrestler Raja Sandow appeared in a small role, his scene is based on a real incident that happened during his first stint at acting. Ramachandran who learned of the incident incorporated it in the film. During the shoot of a duet song, Nagi Reddi expressed disappointment that the costumes and lyrics were not jelling well in one stanza of a song. The next day Ramachandran completed the shots and Reddi was surprised seeing the involvement of Ramachandran.

== Soundtrack ==
The soundtrack album was composed by Viswanathan–Ramamoorthy. The song "Naan Aanaiyittal", written by Vaali, had two versions; the film version had word "kadavul" (god) and Ramachandran did not agree to use the word but later relented after being requested by Vaali, but it got changed into the word "thalaivar" (leader) in audio records. The song remains one of the famous songs from the film. The song "Kumari Pennin" was remixed by Srikanth Deva in Perumal (2009).

Track listing
No.	Title	Lyrics	Singer(s)	Length
1.	"Naan Aanaiyitaal"	Vaali	T. M. Soundararajan	5:05
2.	"Kankalum Kaavadi"	Alangudi Somu	L. R. Eswari, Chorus	5:08
3.	"Kumari Pennin"	Vaali	T. M. Soundararajan, K.Veeramani, P. Susheela	5:50
4.	"Malarukku Thendral"	Alangudi Somu	L. R. Eswari, P. Susheela	4:59
5.	"Naan Maanthoppil"	Vaali	T. M. Soundararajan, L. R. Eswari	5:56
6.	"Penn Ponaal"	Vaali	T. M. Soundararajan, P. Susheela	4:13
Total length:				31:11

== Release and reception ==
Enga Veettu Pillai was released on 14 January 1965, Pongal day, and distributed by Emgeeyaar Pictures in Madras. The film emerged a major box office success, running for over 25 weeks in theatres, thereby becoming a silver jubilee film. It sold 1.2 million tickets in Madras and yielded record ₹5 million in entertainment tax revenue (about 10 per cent) to the exchequer.

Sekar and Sundar of the Tamil magazine Ananda Vikatan, in their review dated 24 January 1965, called it the best film which the reviewer have seen in Tamil cinema on the theme of an imposter to that point. The reviewers felt the film had newness in its scenes, and overall it was a film which entertains the audience and occupies a special place among the good films in Tamil cinema. Kalki felt Nagesh and Thangavelu's comedy lacked newness, but said the film could be watched for Ramachandran's performance as Ramu and the colour cinematography. Dilip Kumar, who portrayed the twins in the Hindi version Ram Aur Shyam, personally regarded Ramachandran's performance better than his own. Enga Veettu Pillai was the first film for Ramachandran that won him Best Actor awards from both the Madras Film Fans' and Filmgoer's Associations.

== Legacy ==
Enga Veettu Pillai inspired several later Tamil films which focused on the theme of identical twins separated at birth and then crossing paths when they grow up, such as Kalyanaraman (1979) and Thoongathey Thambi Thoongathey (1983). The basic storyline of Seeta Aur Geeta (1972) was noted for its similarity with Enga Veettu Pillai, as its female lead portrays identical twins instead of male. This prompted Chakrapani to remake the film in Telugu and Tamil as Ganga Manga (1973) and Vani Rani (1974). The whip used by Ramachandran attained popularity in Tamil cinema, as did the scene where his character uses it to threaten to whip Nambiar's character.

Footage of the song "Naan Aanaiyittal" was interposed in Villu (2009). Following Vaali's death in 2013, The Hindu included "Naan Aanaiyittal" among his best songs in their collection, "Best of Vaali: From 1964 – 2013". The 1966 film Naan Aanaiyittal, also starring Ramachandran, was named after this film's song. The 2017 Telugu film Nene Raju Nene Mantri was dubbed in Tamil as Naan Aanaiyittal, also named after the song.

== Bibliography ==
- Balabharathi (2015). Tamil Cinema 80 – Part 1. Nakkheeran. ISBN 9789381828403.
- Dhananjayan, G. (2011). The Best of Tamil Cinema, 1931 to 2010: 1931–1976. Galatta Media. OCLC 733724281.
