= Prarambha =

- Directed by: Santosh Sivan
- Written by: Santosh Sivan; Mubina Rattonsey
- Starring: Prabhu Deva; Skandha; B. Saroja Devi
- Cinematography: Santosh Sivan
- Edited by: Shakti Hasija
- Production company: Santosh Sivan Productions
- Release date: 8 September 2007 (Toronto Film Festival)
- Running time: 13 minutes
- Country: India
- Language: Kannada

Prarambha (translation: Beginning) is a 2007 Indian short film directed by Santosh Sivan and funded by Bill Gates foundation. The film stars Prabhu Deva, Skandha and B. Saroja Devi in the lead roles.

The movie premiered at Toronto International Film Festival in 2007.

The movie screened for the first time in India on 1 December 2007 at 38th International Film Festival of India.

== Overview ==
The film was a part of Mira Nair's noble project AIDS Jaago (AIDS Awake), a series of four short films, Prarambha (directed by Sivan, Migration (directed by Nair), Positive (directed by Farhan Akhtar) and Blood Brothers (directed by Vishal Bhardwaj) in a joint initiative of Nair's Mirabai Films, voluntary organisations Avahan and Bill & Melinda Gates Foundation with a view of creating awareness about HIV/AIDS. The film was made for Richard Gere’s AIDS foundation. The film was entirely shot on location in and around Mysore.

The film, directed by Santosh Sivan, is about a truck driver (Prabhu Deva) who helps a boy (Skandha) in his quest for the person who gave him birth, and then helps get him reinstated in school, from which he had been dismissed for being HIV-positive.

== Plot ==
Puttaswamy (Prabhu Deva), a truck driver, arrives at his place in Mysore. Puttaswamy discovers a little boy Kittu (Skandha) in the back of his truck. Kittu is on a journey to find his mother (Anu Prabhakar), who left him upon discovering that she was HIV positive.

The next scene involves a call-girl (played by Ramya) trying to approach Puttaswamy, but he declines her invitation and says he has stopped indulging these days. Meanwhile, she gets troubled by a thug (Sadhu Kokila), a pimp who demands money from her. When Puttaswamy tries to stop the thug, he gets thrashed by him. Suddenly a cop (Jai Jagdeesh) arrives at the place and harasses Puttaswamy for the happenings. Kittu saves him by pretending to be Puttaswamy's son. Later, Puttaswamy takes the boy to his home and discovers that the woman in the house (Chitra Shenoy) is not Kittu's mother, and learns from her that Kittu's mother has been admitted to hospital. Immediately he rushes to the hospital. It turns out the mother is dying of AIDS and doesn't want to face her son.

Kittu refuses to go back home and school, because he was rusticated from school.

Puttaswamy takes the boy to the house of his grandmother (Jayanthi) and promises that he will take back the boy to his school, but he finds that the school will not admit him back because the boy has contracted HIV from his parents. The Headmistress (B. Saroja Devi) says some ignorant parents fear it may spread to their children, but she promises to the boy that she will try to take him back.

The school administrators organise an awareness program and educate parents about HIV. Puttaswamy campaigns among parents to change their perceptions, until the school takes the boy back. The story ends when Kittu gets re-admitted to the school.

== Cast ==
- Prabhu Deva - Puttaswamy Gowda (Truck Driver)
- B. Saroja Devi - School Principal
- Skandha - Kittu
- Jayanthi - Grandmother
- Anu Prabhakar - Mother
- Ramya - Sex Worker
- Sadhu Kokila - Gunda
- Jai Jagadish - Policeman
- Chitra Shenoy - Lady at House
- Avni Jairam - Little Girl
- Lata - Patient
- Nagaratna - Parent
- Pandu - Lawyer
- Savitha - Nurse
- N. G. Usha - Teacher

== Awards ==
Prarambha won the National Film Award for Best Educational/Motivational/Instructional Film at the 55th National Film Awards.
