= Kann Malar =

- Directed by: Pattu
- Screenplay by: Madurai Thirumaran
- Produced by: V. K. Ramasamy
- Starring: B. Saroja Devi; Sowcar Janaki; Gemini Ganesan
- Music by: K. V. Mahadevan
- Production company: Ganesh Movies
- Release date: 24 September 1970
- Running time: 162 minutes
- Country: India
- Language: Tamil

Kann Malar is a 1970 Indian Tamil-language romance film directed by Pattu and written by Madurai Thirumaran. The film stars B. Saroja Devi, Sowcar Janaki and Gemini Ganesan. It was released on 24 September 1970, and failed commercially.

== Plot ==
In the village of Thennur, Valli the is daughter of a poor priest and temple caretaker, who is raised up with morals and good nature. Contrast to her is Vadivu, a tomboy. Vadivu always has issues with the other villagers and Kanaga is her close friend. Vadivu is the troublemaker and the villagers usually are upset with her. Her brother is a shopkeeper, who eyes Valli. The villagers plan to build a hospital in their village to aid the villagers needs and the people are required to pay the money as a contribution. The engineer to build the hospital is Kannan, who hails from a wealthy family. Kannan's father is Ambalavanan, an author. Writer Ponnambala copies Ambalavanan's work and they both often have comical conflicts. Kannan has a paternal aunt, who dreams of marrying her daughter Gomathi to Kannan.

Kannan comes to the village and meets Valli, whom he immediately falls in love with, with Valli reciprocating it. Vadivu on the other hand, is punished by the chieftain, for trespassing into the temple property to pluck flowers in the idea of selling them. She is required to pay a fine of ₹50. She and Valli get into an argument as Valli is the one who got her caught. It is shown that she and Valli are on different paths. Valli's father, works day and night in the field to pay to sum of money that is to be contributed for the construction of the hospital. Meanwhile, Vadivu and Kanaga steal mangoes from the chieftain's plantation to pay her fine. To do so, Vadivu sings and dances with the guard, as Kanaga steals from the plantation.

Valli's father falls sick due to his age and the work her performed in the field. To pay for the medical expense, Valli doesn't have the required money. Vadivu's brother misbehaves with her when she goes to ask for money as help. She flees from there. As per the advice of her neighbour, she plucks flowers and plans to sell it in the market. Vadivu and Kanaga see this and plan to sabotage her. In the end, Valli is unable to sell her flowers and is broke. She decides to commit suicide as she is unable to provide the basic need for her father. Vadivu sees this as saves her, also telling her she would bring the doctor who asked for money if he is to visit patients. Vadivu succeeds in bringing the doctor to check on Valli's father. Valli realises that Vadivu made the doctor agree by blackmailing him. The girls get into a heated argument as Valli disapproves of Vadivu's behaviour. When asked to make promise that Vadivu would change her ways, she doesn't and leaves. Valli goes into dilemma if she should give the medicine to her father or not.

Vadivu learns that Kanaga is engaged but she is not allowed to go inside the house. Reason being, Vadivu is not behaving like an ideal girl. Heartbroken, Vadivu sees the guard from the plantation in a mentally disturbed state. She learns that the chieftain fired him due to his irresponsibility. Valli's father also dies and Vadivu learns that she did not give the medicine. Grief-stricken, Vadivu decides change her behaviour and character. Despite being a cause for her father's death, Valli tells about the good qualities that Vadivu has and they become good friends. Seeking this opportunity, Vadivu's brother asks her to speak to Valli about his desire to marry her. But when Vadivu sees Valli and Kannan together, she arranges their wedding. Kannan's paternal aunt decides to break the alliance. She arranges Ponnambalam to create confusion but Ponnambala double crosses her. He makes Vadivu's brother go unconscious and plans to do the wedding without any problem.

But the train that Valli and Vadivu are travelling to reach the city for the wedding meets with an accident. Valli and Vadivu are presumed dead and Kannan's family is heartbroken. But the girls survive with Vadivu losing her leg and Valli losing her eyesight. Vadivu's brother, dies in the accident when he comes to assault Valli. They prefer to stay unnoticed as Valli fears Kannan would reject her. Vadivu and Valli decide to accompany each other. They get shelter in a slum with the help of a few locals and start a life there. Vadivu learns that the government has given compensation to the accident victims. She also meets Amabalavanar and Kannan's family decide to accept Valli no matter what. Vadivu collects the money but a thief steals them from their hut. Chasing after the thief, Vadivu falls unconscious and Valli wanders off looking for her.

Vadivu and Valli later find each other but a doctor bumps his car into them. He himself performs Valli's surgery and she gets her eyesight back. But later she realises from the doctor that Vadivu succumbed to her injuries. He then provides her with a letter written by Vadivu for Valli, in which Vadivu had said that she had donated her eyes for Valli. Valli gets emotional as Vadivu had mentioned that she would be living within her forever.

== Cast ==
- B. Saroja Devi as Valli
- Sowcar Janaki as Vadivu
- Gemini Ganesan as Kannan
- Nagesh as Ponnambalam
- V. K. Ramasamy as Kavingar Ambalavanar
- S. A. Ashokan as Mariyappan
- K. A. Thangavelu as Village Chieftain
- V. Nagayya as Plantation Guard
- Manorama as Kanaga
- Rama Prabha as Gomathi
- Sundari Bai as Savithri
- Kadhar as Mariyappan's assistant

== Soundtrack ==
The soundtrack was composed by K. V. Mahadevan.

Track listing
No.	Title	Lyrics	Singer(s)	Length
1.	"Adi Aayi Aayi Aayi Aayi Kalyana"	Kannadasan	P. Susheela
2.	"Ambalathu Nadaraja Un"	Kannadasan	S. Janaki, M. Balamuralikrishna
3.	"Pothumada Sami Ponnu"	Vaali	P. Susheela
4.	"Othuvar Un Peyar Othuvar"	Vaali	Soolamangalam Rajalakshmi, M. Balamuralikrishna
5.	"Poovundu Pinjundu Kaayundu"	A. Maruthakasi	L. R. Eswari
6.	"Aathangarai Orathile Yarumilla"	Kannadasan	T. M. Soundararajan

== Production ==
- Initially, this film was in production since 1967 and was released three years late in 1970. The actor and producer who produced this film, V. K. Ramasamy, directed this Kanmalar film through K. S. Gopalakrishnan after the film Selvam.
- But since he had directed other films, he directed the film with director Krishnan–Panju.
- Initially, in this film, actress K. R. Vijaya played the role of Vadivu in a rival character with Saroja Devi.
- Later, as the film progressed, K. R. Vijaya became a bit overweight, so he was removed and Sowcar Janaki was cast in the role.

== Release and reception ==
Kann Malar was released on 24 September 1970. The Indian Express called the film "less than mediocre", criticising its lack of originality, but praised only Janaki's performance. The film was commercially unsuccessful.
