= Opera House (film) =

- Showcard
- Directed by: P. L. Santoshi
- Produced by: A.A. Nadiadwala
- Starring: Ajit; B. Saroja Devi; K.N. Singh; Lalita Pawar
- Edited by: Dharamvir
- Music by: Chitragupta
- Release date: 1961
- Country: India
- Language: Hindi

Opera House is a 1961 Indian Hindi-language mystery film produced by A.A. Nadiadwala and directed by P.L. Santoshi. The film stars Ajit, B. Saroja Devi, K.N. Singh and Lalita Pawar among others.

== Plot ==
Saroj (B. Saroja Devi) lives a poor lifestyle in Nagpur along with her widowed mother, Leela Sharma (Lalita Pawar) and a younger sister, Nanhi. She gets employed as a singer/dancer in Bombay and relocates there. Once there, she meets with Ajit Rai (Ajit), and the couple fall in love. Circumstances compel her to re-locate to Nagpur and seek employment with another dance/drama company run by Chunilal. Ajit decides to follow her to Nagpur, and visits her mother and sister. It is from here he locates the dance/drama company and does meet Saroj — only to find out that she has changed her name to Mary D'Souza. Ajit will eventually discover that Saroj had witnessed the murder of Chunilal and the killer(s) are now out to silence her — and whoever else dares to come in their way...

== Cast ==
Character	Actor
Ajit Rai	Ajit
Saroj Sharma/Mary D'Souza	B. Saroja Devi
Danial	K.N. Singh
Leela Sharma	Lalita Pawar
Lily	Bela Bose
Peter	Maruti Rao
Street Singer	Johnny Whisky
Chunilal	S.N. Banerjee
Nanhi Sharma	Leela
Munshi Munakka	Munshi Munakka
Mirza Panwala	Mirza Musharraf
Sarju	Sarjoo
Mr. Ranjit Rai	Niranjan Sharma
Mrs. Ranjit Rai	Mumtaz Begum

== Soundtrack ==
Music in the film has been given by Chitragupta and Lyricist is Majrooh Sultanpuri. The song "Dekho Mausam Kya Bahar Hai" is based on the Jim Reeves song "Bimbo".

#	Title	Singer	Raga
1	"Dekho Mausam Kya Bahar Hai"	Mukesh, Lata Mangeshkar	
2	"Balma Maane Na, Bairi Chup Na Rahe"	Lata Mangeshkar	Malkauns
3	"Na Milte Hum To Kaho Tum"	Lata Mangeshkar and Mukesh	
4	"Raste Mein Tere Kab Se Hain Khade"	Lata Mangeshkar and Mohammed Rafi	
5	"Sona Na Sitaron Ka Hai Kahna"	Lata Mangeshkar	
6	"Saiyan Hae Hae Tere Gaon Mein"	Lata Mangeshkar	
