= Uma Chandi Gowri Sankarula Katha =

- Theatrical release poster
- Directed by: K. V. Reddy
- Written by: Pingali (dialogues)
- Screenplay by: K. V. Reddy
- Story by: K. V. Reddy; Pingali Nagendra Rao; Singeetam Srinivasa Rao
- Produced by: Chakrapani; Nagi Reddy
- Starring: N. T. Rama Rao; B. Saroja Devi
- Cinematography: Madhav Bulbule
- Edited by: G. Kalyana Sunder; D. G. Jayaram
- Music by: Pendyala Nageswara Rao
- Production company: Vijaya Productions
- Release date: 11 January 1968
- Running time: 166 minutes
- Country: India
- Language: Telugu

Uma Chandi Gowri Sankarula Katha (transl. The story of Uma, Chandi, Gowri and Sankara) is a 1968 Indian Telugu-language Hindu mythological film directed by K. V. Reddy. The film was produced by Nagi Reddi and Chakrapani under the Vijaya Productions banner. It stars N. T. Rama Rao and B. Saroja Devi, with music composed by Pendyala Nageswara Rao. Released on 11 January 1968, the film was a commercial failure.

== Plot ==
In a debate among Saptarushis where Bhrigu contends Jamadagni regarding the superiority of males & females in the universe. To explore it, Bhrigu moves to Kailasa, assigning hermitage's responsibility to his wife, Puluma Devi. After landing, it's an inopportune time when Siva & Parvati conducts Tandava. So, the guard couple bars him, whom he curses as demons Aaha & Oohu. Plus, Bhrigu swore a curse to Parvati's condone to take three births on Earth and suffer from misfortune. Enraged, Parvati reserves his fortune to be a demon Lambakasura and carry out mass torture when he begs for mercy. Here, Siva pardons him saying he will be spending most of his time in sleep, and he will be relieved after a fight with him. Nevertheless, to Parvati, Siva shortens to arise as triplets at once, and he too comes forth to shield her. Now, she originates into 3 in the womb of Puluma. There after, Lambakasura trounces to Earth, mingling with Aaha & Oohu. Once, he onslaughts on his hermitage about to slay the triplets when a big rip occurs, and they split. The first is gained by King Ananda Bhupati, the second to tribal thieves chieftain Billu Dora, and the third by a prostitute, Seshayyamma. They are reared as Uma, Chandi, & Gowri respectively. Devastated, Puluma attempts self-sacrifice when Siva rescues her and takes a small boy's form. Jamadagni shelters the two, and Puluma raises the boy, calling him Jaya Shankar.

Years roll by, and Shankar molds as a gallant & savior of hermitages from periodic attacks of Lambakasura, who is ongoing in bed. To seek vengeance, Aaha & Oohu wizardly connect Shankar with Uma in the fort for a short while. The two suffer from romantic agony, and Shankar walks on, affirming to marry her. Amid, he acquaints & squabbles with spitfire Chandi and proposes further to Billu Dora. Billu Dora stipulates that Shankar be his staff of a thief, and he adopts it. Once Shankar bets with Chandi and intrudes into the fort for robbery. Therein, he reconciles with Uma, tracing it. Ananda Bhupati mandates to seize him, but Shankar absconds. In that track, he encounters imploring Gauri, the Lord, to rescue him from their profession when Shankar mimics proclaiming to arrive as a Jangam. Like that, Shankar traps Seshayyamma and continues his crush on the three sisters. Uma angsts over Shankar, and knowing it in disguised form, he boards again into the fort and flees with her. Ananda Bhupati backs his soldiers to capture them when they detect Chandi and forcibly lock up her along with Billu Dora. Parallelly, Gauri is presented before Ananda Bhupati's judiciary to address an issue. Everyone is startled by their resemblance and realizes they are sibling.

Simultaneously, Lambakasura awakes, lusts on Uma, whom he abducts, and cages in an inaccessible place. In her quest, Shankar softens the pain of Gandharva, who facilitates him in transforming into Lambakasura's body, which is in sleep at this instant. At the same time, he warns that the demon gets his shape. However, Shankar frees Uma in Lambakasura attire. Alongside, misinterpreting Lambakasura as Shankar Aaha & Oohu shifts him to the palace of Anand Bhupati. Subsequently, he is tortured to awake for the whereabouts of Uma when Jamadagni discerns and divulges the actuality. Shankar reaches his hermitage and acquires his pure form. Listening to the complete story, Puluma declares the 3 are her daughters, and they speed to the fort. By then, roused Lambakasura upheavals when Shankar arrives, kills him, and Bhrigu recoups. At last, it unites Bhrigu & Puluma, and Uma, Chandi & Gauri mingle into Parvati and set foot in Kailasa with Siva. Finally, the movie ends with a proclamation: If the mighty forsook their patience a while, it leads to huge catastrophes.

== Cast ==
- N. T. Rama Rao as Siva / Jaya Shankar
- B. Saroja Devi as Parvati/ Uma, Chandi & Gowri (Triple role)
- Mukkamala as Bhrigu/Demon
- Relangi as King Ananda Bhupati
- Ramana Reddy as Butkai
- Dhulipala as Jamadagni
- Padmanabham as Madan Singh
- Balakrishna as Omkaram
- Allu Ramalingaiah as Lekhapataka
- Dr. Sivaramakrishnaiah as Billu Dora
- Rushyendramani as Pulimadevi
- Chayadevi as Seshayyamma
- Girija as a queen
- Suryakala as Madan Singh's wife
- Meena Kumari as Chathurika

== Soundtrack ==
Uma Chandi Gowri Shankarula Katha

Film score by Pendyala Nageswara Rao
- Released: 1968
- Genre: Soundtrack
- Length: 28:00
- Producer: Pendyala Nageswara Rao

Music composed by Pendyala Nageswara Rao. Lyrics were written by Pingali.

S. No.	Song title	Singers	length
1	"Aahasakhi Ee Vaname"	P. Susheela	3:01
2	"Emito Ee Maya"	Ghantasala	3:59
3	"Abbalalo o Abbalalo"	Ghantasala	2:43
4	"Kalagantiva Cheli"	Ghantasala	2:47
5	"Nannu Varinchu Veerudu"	L. R. Eswari	2:45
6	"Nee Leela Loney"	Ghantasala, P. Susheela	3:19
7	"Sri Gowri"	P. Leela	2:32
8	"Siggulolike Sengari"	Ghantasala, L. R. Eswari	3:34
9	"Yelamarachinaavo"	S. Janaki	3:20

== Bibliography ==
- U. Vinayaka Rao (2012), Telugu Cine Rangam - Pouranika Chitralu, Hyderabad: Telugu Academy
