= Malathi =

First female fighter of the Tamil Tigers to die in combat (1967-1987)

2nd Lieutenant Malathy
- Born: 4 January 1967; Mannar
- Died: 10 October 1987 (aged 20); Kopay, Jaffna
- Occupation: Tamil Militant
- Known for: First women martyr

Sahayaseeli Pedhuruppillai, alias Malathi (or Malathy) (1967–1987), was a female Sri Lankan Tamil Tigers fighter, the first to die in combat, hence revered as the first female martyr. Her death anniversary is commemorated as Women's Awakening day. Her death is significant as later females joined the Tamil Tigers at all levels and played significant roles (including the Black Tigers).

On 10 October 1987, Malathi was injured in combat when an LTTE women unit, which she was leading, was confronted by the IPKF near Navatkuli-Kopay Road in Kopay near Jaffna. Although clearly overwhelmingly outnumbered by the IPKF soldiers with far superior firepower, her team still successfully blocked and retaliated the IPKF and forced the IPKF to withdraw. In the battle, she was bleeding profusely and rendered immobile when her fellow fighter soldier girls rescued her. Malathi, realizing the grave situation, wanted the girls to leave her and go on with the fight, and then took her cyanide capsule to avoid being captured. Tamil Tigers called one of their brigades the Malathi Brigade in honour of her and built a memorial for her in Kilinochchi which was opened on October 10, 2004.
