= Paarambariyam =

- Poster
- Directed by: Manobala
- Story by: P. Kalaimani
- Produced by: R. Jambunathan
- Starring: Sivaji Ganesan; B. Saroja Devi; Pandiyan
- Cinematography: B. S. Lokanath
- Edited by: V. Jayapal
- Music by: Shankar–Ganesh
- Production company: Sasivarnam Films
- Release date: 13 November 1993
- Country: India
- Language: Tamil

Paarambariyam (transl. Tradition) is a 1993 Indian Tamil language film directed by Manobala and produced by R. Jambunathan. The film stars Sivaji Ganesan, B. Saroja Devi and Pandiyan. It was released on 13 November 1993.

== Cast ==
- Sivaji Ganesan as Rajamannar
- B. Saroja Devi as Meenakshi
- Pandiyan as Sekar
- Nirosha as Radha
- Chithra as Vimala
- V. K. Ramasamy as Balakrishnan
- Malaysia Vasudevan as Aandiyappan
- Vennira Aadai Moorthy as Vadivel
- Senthil as Broker Kanthasamy
- Gandhimathi
- Idichapuli Selvaraj
- Periya Karuppu Thevar

== Soundtrack ==
The soundtrack of Paarambariyam was composed by Shankar–Ganesh, with lyrics written by Pulamaipithan, Muthulingam, Poonguilan and Ilavarasu.

Track listing
No.	Title	Singer(s)	Length
1.	"Ilam Pookkale"	K. S. Chithra
2.	"Rajadhi Raja"	Mano
3.	"Sandhana Kaatru"	Mano, K. S. Chithra
4.	"Enga Ooru Rasa"	Mano, Vani Jairam
5.	"Yelapoo"	Vani Jairam
6.	"Simma Kuralukum"	Malaysia Vasudevan, P. Susheela
7.	"Thanga Mugathile"	Vani Jairam
