= Anbe Vaa (1966 film) =

1966 film by A. C. Tirulokchandar

- Theatrical release poster
- Directed by: A. C. Tirulokchandar
- Story by: A. C. Tirulokchandar
- Produced by: M. Murugan; M. Kumaran; M. Saravanan; A.V. Meiyappan
- Starring: M. G. Ramachandran; B. Saroja Devi
- Cinematography: S. Maruti Rao; P. N. Sundaram
- Edited by: R. G. Gope
- Music by: M. S. Viswanathan
- Production company: AVM Productions
- Release date: 14 January 1966
- Running time: 175 minutes
- Country: India
- Language: Tamil
- Budget: ₹ 3 million

Anbe Vaa (/ənbeɪ vɑː/ transl. Come, My Love) is a 1966 Indian Tamil-language romantic comedy film written and directed by A. C. Tirulokchandar. The film stars M. G. Ramachandran and B. Saroja Devi, with S. A. Ashokan, Nagesh, T. R. Ramachandran, P. D. Sambandam, Manorama and T. P. Muthulakshmi in supporting roles. Based on the 1961 American film Come September, it follows JB, a wealthy industrialist who goes on vacation to his bungalow in Shimla, only to discover that his caretaker and his wife have left for Kasi after renting the bungalow to a family. The rest of the film revolves around JB's response to this situation.

Anbe Vaa was the first colour film of AVM Productions, and was shot in Eastmancolor. It was also the studio and Tirulokchandar's only collaboration with Ramachandran. Principal photography began in August 1965 and shooting took place in Shimla, Ooty, and at the hill station of Kufri. The soundtrack and background music were composed by M. S. Viswanathan while the lyrics for the songs were written by Vaali.

Anbe Vaa was released on 14 January 1966, during the festive occasion of Pongal. It received positive reviews from critics, who particularly praised Ramachandran's performance, as he was known for doing mainly action and drama films up until that point in his career. The film was also a commercial success, with a theatrical run of over 23 weeks.

== Plot ==
J. Balasubramaniam "JB" is a wealthy and popular industrialist who has been working without a vacation for two years straight. Exhausted after a Europe and New York trip, he decides to take a vacation at his bungalow in Shimla. Upon his arrival, he discovers that his caretaker Krishnaiah has rented the bungalow to a Bangalore-based couple, Punyakodi and Pappamma, and their daughter, Geetha.

Krishnaiah and his wife leave for Kasi after taking the money for the rent, leaving Krishnaiah's daughter Kannamma, and his brother-in-law Ramaiah, in charge of the house and the guests. JB decides not to reveal his true identity, instead pretending to be JB's personal secretary Balu, and pays the rent for a place in his own house. Ramaiah, who has never met JB, takes the money and gives JB's room to Balu without realising they are the same man.

Balu plays continual pranks on Geetha, during the course of which he also falls in love with her. She too falls in love with him, but circumstances and their egos, prevent them both from expressing their feelings. One day, Balu pretends to suffer from chest pain, which scares Geetha, causing her to finally admit that she loves him.

The next morning, when Geetha and Ramaiah go to Balu to enquire about his health, Balu, exiting from the bathroom, fails to see that Geetha is there. He tells Ramaiah about the prank he played on her. Enraged at having been deceived by Balu, Geetha begins to question whether or not his professed love for her is real. She brings her friends, who are vacationing in Shimla, to the residence and tries to drive Balu out of the house. When her plan backfires and her friends start supporting Balu, she becomes spiteful and tells her parents to move forward with a planned marriage to Sekar, her maternal cousin.

Geetha reconciles with Balu after he saves her from a weightlifter named Sitting Bull. But by the time Balu confesses his love for her, Geetha's engagement is already fixed to Sekar. Sekar turns out to be a school friend of JB, but he agrees to play along with the trick. When he discovers that Balu and Geetha are truly in love, he steps aside, wishing the couple well. When Balu finally reveals himself as JB, Geetha, again not knowing what to believe, thinks the wedding plans are yet another of his pranks and tries to run away. He finds her and clears up all of the misunderstandings between them. The two then get married.

== Cast ==
Lead actors

- M. G. Ramachandran as J. Balasubramaniam (JB/Balu)
- B. Saroja Devi as Geetha

Male supporting actors

- S. A. Ashokan as Sekar
- C. K. Nagesh as Ramaiah
- T. R. Ramachandran as Punyakodi
- P. D. Sambandam as Krishnaiah
- S. V. Ramadas as JB's Personal Secretary

Female supporting actors

- Manorama as Kannamma
- T. P. Muthulakshmi as Pappamma
- Madhavi as Mary
- M. S. S. Bhagyam as Govindhammal

Pasi Narayanan, uncredited, plays a college student.

== Production ==
=== Development ===
As a fan of M. G. Ramachandran since childhood, M. Saravanan had wished to see him in an AVM Productions film. Director A. C. Tirulokchandar prepared the story of Anbe Vaa based on the American romantic comedy film Come September (1961), with Ramachandran in mind, contrary to AVM's general practice of choosing actors for completed scripts. He was paid ₹70,000 for directing the film. The film was produced by Saravanan and his brothers Murugan and Kumaran. Aaroor Dass wrote the dialogues, and S. P. Muthuraman worked as an assistant director. S. Maruti Rao, R. G. Gope and A. K. Shekar were in charge of the cinematography, editing, and art direction, respectively. A. K. Chopra was in charge of the dance choreography, and Raghuram, who went on to become a successful dance choreographer in Indian cinema, worked as an assistant to him. This was their first film together.

=== Casting ===
Although the script differed from what Ramachandran was generally known for: action or drama films, he agreed to do the film because he liked the story. Tirulokchandar recalled, "I found [M. G. Ramachandran] smiling throughout the storytelling session. At the end he said, 'I'll do it. We will be mere puppets in your hands and the credit will go only to you.'". Ramachandran gave a call sheet of 72 days for participating in the film. Saravanan states in his 2005 book AVM 60 Cinema that ₹ 300,000 was Ramachandran's salary, but the latter demanded an additional ₹ 25,000; his final pay was ₹ 325,000. (Note: The exchange rate in 1966 was 4.79 Indian rupees (₹) per 1 US dollar (US$).) The Economic Times stated in 2010 that Ramachandran was paid 10% of the film's ₹ 3 million budget. Anbe Vaa remained his only collaboration with both Tirulokchandar and AVM. (Note: Tirulokachandar had previously worked as an assistant director to R. Padmanaban on Kumari (1952), which starred M. G. Ramachandran.)

S. A. Ashokan, who helped Tirulokchandar cast Ramachandran, portrayed the role of Sekar. Ramachandran recommended J. Jayalalithaa for the role of the female lead Geetha, but it eventually went to B. Saroja Devi. She was paid ₹ 90,000 for acting in the film. Her costume design was done by the Anna Salai-based Indian Silk House. Ramachandran initially recommended K. A. Thangavelu for the role of Geetha's father Punyakodi, but Saravanan said that his father wanted T. R. Ramachandran in the role due to their long-standing friendship. M. G. Ramachandran accepted the decision and told Saravanan not to tell T. R. Ramachandran about his initial choice.

=== Filming ===
Anbe Vaa was AVM Production's first colour film and was made in Eastmancolor. Principal photography began with a puja ceremony held on 12 August 1965. Although the story is set in Shimla, most of the film was shot in Ooty. Shooting in Shimla took place for only five days. For the sequences filmed in Shimla, P. N. Sundaram was hired as the cinematographer as Maruti Rao was taken ill at the time. The song "Pudhiya Vaanam" was shot in the small hill station of Kufri, located 13 kilometres from Shimla, as well as at Mall Road, Shimla. Portions of the film were also shot at a 200-year-old bungalow covering 15 acres in Ooty. In a scene where Punyakodi eats chicken, Tirulokchandar requested his caterer to make a cake shaped like a chicken for T. R. Ramachandran to eat as he was a vegetarian. Three or four lovebirds were bought for the filming of the song "Love Birds".

Savi, an editor who worked for the Tamil magazine, Ananda Vikatan, accompanied the production unit and published an article on the making of the film. He even appeared in "Pudhiya Vaanam" as an extra. "Naan Paarthathile" was one of the film's few songs that was shot outdoors, as M. G. Ramachandran did not want to attract attention from his large fan following. The Government Botanical Garden in Ooty was also used as a shooting location. The production unit, composed of 20 crew members, along with Tirulokchandar, M. G. Ramachandran, Saroja Devi and Savi, initially flew to Delhi. From Delhi, they travelled to Kalka by train, then continued on to Shimla, using three first-generation Chevrolet Impalas.

The film's skating scenes, involving Ramachandran and Saroja Devi, were completed in two days. Both Ramachandran and Saroja Devi were initially hesitant to perform the scene, but went through with it after they received encouragement from the local population. For some scenes in the film, Saroja Devi was made to walk with mincing steps and flutter her eyelashes. She and Ramachandran also performed the twist in the film. For the action sequence in which JB fights a wrestler, Tirulokchander asked Ramachandran to lift the wrestler overhead and hold him in the air for some time before trampling him, and Ramachandran obliged. For the climax, Ramachandran initially came with an idea of his and Ashokan's characters fighting vigorously, but Tirulokchandar felt it would not fit in a film of this nature and a soft natured ending was more suitable, to which Ramachandran agreed. The final length of the film was 4,854.70 metres (15,927.5 ft).

== Themes ==
Although Saravanan has acknowledged to Anbe Vaa being based on Come September, music historian Vamanan wrote for The Times of India that it was "structured as a Roman Holiday with a man as the protagonist". Folklorist and writer M. D. Muthukumaraswamy, writing for the same newspaper, compared JB to the sage Vishvamitra, describing the former as "the archetypal male figure who resists the advances of the beautiful damsels", similar to Vishvamitra resisting the temptations of Menaka the apsara. Sujatha Narayan, writing for The New Indian Express, noted that Anbe Vaa, like other films starring Ramachandran, reflected his personal belief of not being arrogant towards women, stating, "I recall one of my uncles telling me how MGR would never chase the heroine on screen, never display interest in her first, and how the heroine will always pine for him, even in an out-and-out romantic story like Anbe Vaa."

According to Tamil historian and author Sachi Sri Kantha, the song "Pudhiya Vaanam" had "delicately introduced" the symbol for the political party Dravida Munnetra Kazhagam (DMK), a rising sun, through the lyrics which roughly translate to "While [the] rising sun shines, the world will become aware, the cool wind from Himalaya will touch the heart" in that pre-election year. Writing for the website Scroll.in, Karan Bali noted that though Anbe Vaa was not as "overtly political" as Ramachandran's other films, the black and red clothes he sports as JB in "Pudhiya Vaanam" was a reference to the colours of the DMK. V. Ramji of the magazine Kamadenu noted that, unlike most Ramachandran films which have seven or eight villains, the main villain in Anbe Vaa is egoism.

== Music ==
The soundtrack and score were composed by M. S. Viswanathan, while the lyrics were written by Vaali. Kalyan Subrahmanyam, an anaesthetist and alumnus of Madras Medical College and Stanley Medical College, made his musical debut with this film, singing as part of the chorus. K. Sampath, a sound engineer who joined AVM Productions in the mid-1950s, created the chick mungu (also spelt chik mang) sound effect for the title track. The song "Naadodi", picturised on JB and Geetha performing a twist, was a rock and roll number.

"Pudhiya Vaanam" originally had the lyrics "udaya sooryanin paarvayile" (in the eyes of the rising sun), but after Meiyappan stated that the Censor Board would not accept it, Vaali amended the lyrics to "puthiya sooryanin paarvayile" (in the eyes of the new sun). Regarding this change, Vaali said that if Ramachandran enunciated the words, they would sound like "udaya sooryanin", and he was proven right. The sound effect of the horses' footfall in "Rajavin Paarvai" was created by Meesai Murugesan. The song "Once A Pappa" belongs to Baila, a Sri Lankan musical genre.

All the songs from the soundtrack were popular, especially "Rajavin Parvai", and "Pudhiya Vaanam". Gopal Ethiraj, writing for the Asian Tribune, noted that "Pudhiya Vaanam" was one of several songs written by Vaali for Ramachadran that "helped the latter galvanize masses". This view was also shared by B. Kolappan of The Hindu. Following Vaali's death in 2013, Malathi Rangarajan of The Hindu included "Pudhiya Vaanam" in her collection, Best of Vaali: From 1964–2013.

"Rajavin Parvai" was performed live by French actor and singer Pascal Heni (popularly known as Pascal of Bollywood) during his visit to India in 2003. "Naan Paarthathilae" was performed live by the Chennai-based music group Square Band at the concert "Isai Kaveri" hosted by the Bharathidasan Institute of Management in August 2012. Susheela performed "Rajavin Paarvai" live in 2006 with S. Janaki, in a concert organised by the T. V. K. Cultural Academy, and performed a solo version of the song in Magalir 2007, an event organised at the Indian Medical Association Hall. "Naan Paarthathile" was remixed in the 2020 TV series named after the film.

Track listing
No.	Title	Singer(s)	Length
1.	"Adios Good Bye"	Ms. Liban Bindey	3:17
2.	"Anbe Vaa"	T. M. Soundararajan	4:23
3.	"Love Birds"	P. Susheela	3:39
4.	"Naan Paarthathile"	T. M. Soundararajan, P. Susheela	4:05
5.	"Naadodi Naadodi"	T. M. Soundararajan, P. Susheela, A. L. Raghavan, L. R. Eswari	6:49
6.	"Once Apappa"	A. L. Raghavan and Chorus	1:19
7.	"Puthiya Vaanam"	T. M. Soundararajan	4:06
8.	"Raajaavin Paarvai"	T. M. Soundararajan, P. Susheela	4:34
9.	"Vetkamillai"	P. Susheela and Chorus	3:33
Total length:			35:45

== Release ==
Anbe Vaa was released on 14 January 1966, during the festive occasion of Pongal. When AVM first discussed making the film a Pongal release with Ramachandran, he objected to the suggestion at first as his other film, Naan Aanaiyittal, was already set to release at that time. Ramachandran eventually negotiated a deal with Naan Aanaiyittal's producer R. M. Veerappan to postpone that film's release and allow Anbe Vaa to release on Pongal, while Naan Aanaiyittal was released on 4 February.

Anbe Vaa was dubbed into Telugu as Prema Manasulu and released on 25 April 1969. In November 2008, the Tamil original was screened at the 39th International Film Festival of India under the segment "Lifetime Classics". On 18 April 2010, it was screened at the South Indian Film Chamber Theatre for the Dignity Film Festival held in Chennai along with: Madhumati (1958), Kadhalikka Neramillai (1964), Server Sundaram (1964) and, Thillana Mohanambal (1968). Moser Baer released the DVD of Anbe Vaa on 30 August 2010. The film was later made available for viewing on Amazon Prime Video when it was launched in India in December 2016.

== Reception ==
On 19 February 1966, T. M. Ramachandran of Sport and Pastime said Anbe Vaa "provides entertainment with a capital "E". It has been deliberately shaped in that fashion" and the story "is used only as a peg to hang the numerous songs and dances on." He said the colour photography was "eyefilling, particularly as regards the scenic beauty of the Himalayas", praised M. G. Ramachandran's performance, especially his twist dance, and added that Saroja Devi provided a "good foil", while appreciating the performances of the other supporting cast members. T. M. Ramachandran praised Maruthi Rao's cinematography and Tirulokchandar's direction, concluding, "The producers, M. Murugan, M. Kumaran and M. Saravanan, could well be proud of their work but this should inspire them to make bigger pictures in the future." The review in Ananda Vikatan described Anbe Vaa as an English film in Tamil, and felt that though it did not have any story, viewers could spend three hours in an entertaining manner with the film. Kalki appreciated Tirulokchander's direction, the capturing of Shimla on camera, the colouring process, Nagesh's humour and the performance of the lead pair. Anbe Vaa had a theatrical run of 23 weeks and was a box office success, grossing ₹ 6 million against a budget of ₹ 3 million according to estimates by Dinamalar and Ramachandran's biographer R. Kannan. The scenes featuring Ramachandran and Nagesh were immensely popular, bringing repeat audiences to theatres.

== Legacy ==
Anbe Vaa attained cult status in Tamil cinema, and was one of the first South Indian films to be shot in Shimla, inspiring many other South Indian films to choose Shimla as a shooting location. According to Vamanan, it emerged an "uncommon triumph" for M. G. Ramachandran, who had previously acted mainly in "scrappily made cop and robber flicks". It was one of several films featuring Ramachandran which he used to propagate his ideologies during his election campaigns. Actor and film historian Mohan Raman noted that Ramachandran's acceptance of the role "that went against the then accepted formula for an MGR film" was a demonstration of the actor's faith in Tirulokchandar. Likewise, Vamanan noted that Tirulokchandar "had imbibed the deportment by observing his role model L V Prasad – that film stars looked up to him. So much so that even the usually interfering MGR allowed himself to be moulded under the filmmaker's baton" in Anbe Vaa. The hat worn by Ramachandran onscreen attained popularity, at a time where there was a "minor hat-mania" in Tamil Nadu.

Sujatha Narayanan considered Anbe Vaa the "forerunner to what we see today in the urban romance genre – of flirtatious interactions and ego in a relationship". As of February 2010, the costumes that Ramachandran used in the film are still preserved at AVM Studios. As of 2017, the MGTB car driven by Ramachandran in the film is preserved at the Madras Heritage Club's Vintage cars display. In August 2016, the Studebaker President car driven by Saroja Devi in the film was on display at the 14th annual exhibitions held at Don Bosco Matriculation Higher Secondary School, Chennai. In July 2019, Saravanan ruled out the possibility of a remake, saying, "Some films will work only with a particular star [...] This was why I refused when a popular actor approached me wanting to remake Anbe Vaa as it was a vehicle written specifically for MGR."

== In popular culture ==
References to Anbe Vaa are made in various films. In Unakkaga Ellam Unakkaga (1999), Kundalakesi (Goundamani) imagines himself as M. G. Ramachandran in "Pudhiya Vaanam" by dancing with children, which results in him being mistaken for a kidnapper by the police. In Dhool (2003), Aarumugam (Vikram) echoes a single line, "Pudhiya Vaanam", to signal his arrival to his friends. The 2005 film Anbe Vaa was named after the 1966 film, as was the 2020 TV series. A clip from the song "Love Birds" is featured in Saroja (2008). Scenes from the film were interposed in Villu (2009); in some scenes, Pugazh (Vijay) tries to woo Janavi (Nayanthara) in the same manner that JB woos Geetha. A portion of "Rajavin Paarvai" is used in the song "Vaa Machi" from Onbadhule Guru (2013).

== Bibliography ==
- Chaudhry, Minakshi (2012). Whispering Deodars : Writings from Shimla hills. Rupa Publications. ISBN 978-8129114532.
- Kannan, R. (2017). MGR: A Life. India: Penguin Random House. ISBN 978-0-14-342934-0.
- Ramachandran, Naman (2014) [2012]. Rajinikanth: The Definitive Biography. New Delhi: Penguin Books. ISBN 978-0-14-342111-5.
- Saravanan, M. (2013) [2005]. AVM 60 Cinema (in Tamil) (3rd ed.). Rajarajan Pathippagam. OCLC 1158347612.
