= Kulavilakku =

1969 film by K. S. Gopalakrishnan

- Theatrical release poster
- Directed by: K. S. Gopalakrishnan
- Screenplay by: K. S. Gopalakrishnan
- Based on: Adhyapika
- Produced by: K. S. Sabarinadhan
- Starring: B. Saroja Devi; Gemini Ganesan
- Cinematography: Masthan
- Music by: K. V. Mahadevan
- Production company: Amarjothi Movies
- Release date: 14 June 1969
- Country: India
- Language: Tamil

Kulavilakku (transl. Lamp of the clan) is a 1969 Indian Tamil-language drama film written and directed by K. S. Gopalakrishnan. A remake of the Malayalam film Adhyapika (1968), it stars B. Saroja Devi and Gemini Ganesan. The film was released on 14 June 1969.

== Cast ==
- B. Saroja Devi as Kannamma
- Gemini Ganesan
- S. V. Ranga Rao
- Nagesh
- G. Sakunthala as the teacher
- Vijayasree
- V. K. Ramasamy
- Sachu
- Sridevi
- Rajasulochana
- A. Karunanidhi
- Renuka

== Production ==
Kulavilakku is a remake of the 1968 Malayalam film Adhyapika. It was produced by K. S. Sabarinadhan under Amarjothi Movies, and directed by K. S. Gopalakrishnan who also wrote the screenplay. Cinematography was handled by Masthan.

== Themes ==
According to historian B. Vijayakumar, Kulavilakku follows a trope that was common in 1950s/1960s Indian cinema: "The heroine struggling and sacrificing her life for the people she loved, even though they were not related to her".

== Soundtrack ==
The music was composed by K. V. Mahadevan, with lyrics by Kannadasan.

Track listing
No.	Title	Singer(s)	Length
1.	"Poopoovaap Poothirukku"	P. Susheela
2.	"Kondu Vanthaal Athaik Kondu Vaa"	L. R. Eswari, A. L. Raghavan
3.	"Mekam Thiranda"	T. M. Soundararajan
4.	"Panai maram thennai maram"	P. Susheela

== Release and reception ==
Kulavilakku was released on 14 June 1969. On the same day The Indian Express wrote, "The great asset of the film is the story [...] and the dialogue", and also praised the performance of the cast, particularly Saroja Devi.

== Awards ==
Saroja Devi won the Tamil Nadu State Film Award for Best Actress for her performance in the film.
