= B. Saroja Devi =

Indian actress (1938–2025)

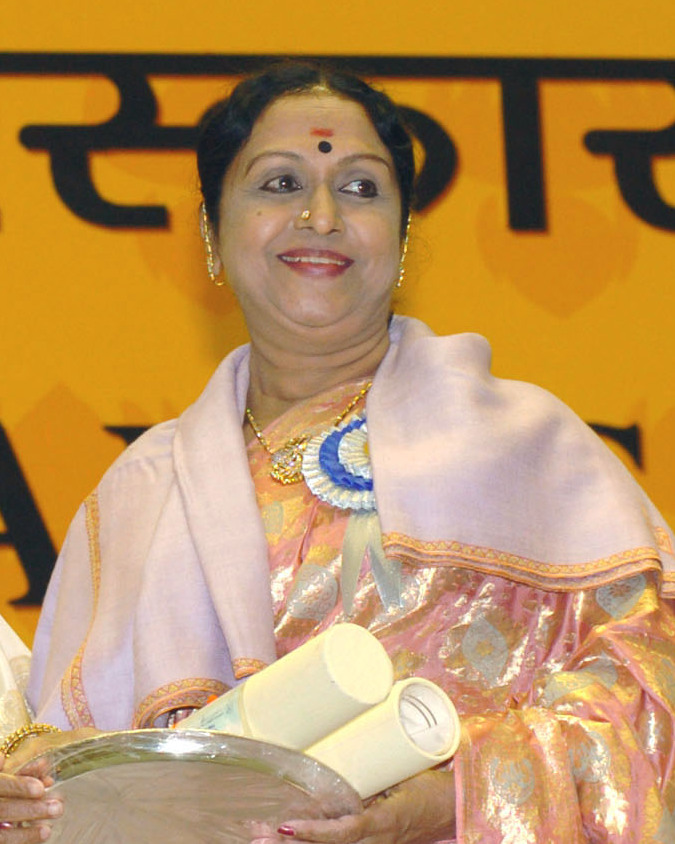
- Saroja Devi in 2008
- Born: B. Saroja Devi; 7 January 1938; Bangalore, Kingdom of Mysore, British India (present-day Karnataka, India)
- Died: 14 July 2025 (aged 87); Bengaluru, Karnataka, India
- Occupation: Actress
- Years active: 1954–2025
- Works: Full list
- Spouse: Sri Harsha (m. 1967; died 1986)
- Children: 4
- Honours: Padma Shri (1969); Padma Bhushan (1992)

B. Saroja Devi (7 January 1938– 14 July 2025) was an Indian actress who appeared in 200 Kannada, Tamil, Telugu and Hindi films over seven decades. She was one of the most successful actresses in the history of Indian cinema. She is regarded as the first female superstar of Kannada cinema. Posthumously, Saroja Devi became the first women to be awarded the Karnataka Ratna, the highest civilian award of the State of Karnataka.

Saroja Devi was fondly called as Kannadathu Painkili (Kannada's parrot) in Tamil cinema and Abhinaya Saraswathi (Goddess of Acting) in Kannada cinema.

Aged 17, Saroja Devi got her first big break with the Kannada film Mahakavi Kalidasa (1955). In Telugu cinema, she made her debut with Panduranga Mahatyam (1957), and starred in a number of successful films until the late 1970s. The Tamil film Nadodi Mannan (1958) made her one of the top actresses in Tamil cinema. After her marriage in 1967, she continued to be in demand, acting in Tamil films until 1974 and in Telugu and Kannada films until the 1980s. She also starred in Hindi films until the mid-1960s, starting with Paigham (1959).

In 1969, Saroja Devi received the Padma Sri, the fourth-highest civilian honour, and in 1992 the Padma Bhushan, the third highest civilian award, from the government of India. She received an honorary doctorate degree from Bangalore University and the Kalaimamani award from the state of Tamil Nadu. She also received the Dr. Rajkumar Award Lifetime Achievement by the Government of Karnataka and the NTR National Award from the Government of Andhra Pradesh.

In 2025, Government of Karnataka announced to constitute the 'Abhinaya Saraswathi B. Saroja Devi Lifetime Achievement Award' in her honour.

== Early life ==
Saroja Devi was born in Bangalore on January 7, 1938, into a Vokkaliga family. The family was native to Dashavara, Channapatna Taluk, Kingdom of Mysore (now Karnataka). Her father, Bhairappa, was a police officer in Mysore. Her mother, Rudramma, was a homemaker. She was the fourth daughter in the family. She studied at St. Teresa's Girls' High School in Chamrajpet, Bangalore.

Bhairappa asked Saroja to learn dancing and had encouraged her to take up acting as a career. Young Saroja Devi was often accompanied by her father to studios, and he would patiently tie on her salangais and massage her swollen feet after her dancing stints. Her mother gave her a strict dress code of no swimsuits and no sleeveless blouses, which she followed for the rest of her career. She was first spotted at the age of 13 by B.R. Krishnamurthy when she was singing at a function, but she declined his film offer.

== Career ==
=== Rise to stardom (1955-1967) ===
Saroja Devi's debut movie and also her first major success was K. R. Seetharama Sastry's Kannada film Mahakavi Kalidasa (1955), in which she played the heroine role 'Vidyadhare'. The film won the National Film Award for Best Feature Film in Kannada. Next, she acted in B. R. Panthulu's Tamil film Thangamalai Ragasiyam (1957), in which she performed a dance sequence. She was one of the very few actresses who starred in Kannada, Tamil, Telugu and Hindi in the 1950s.

Subsequently, she was noted by M. G. Ramachandran (MGR), who cast her as the female lead in Nadodi Mannan (1958), the movie that made her one of the most popular actresses in Tamil Nadu. She was then signed up for the Hindi film Paigham (1959), in which her co-stars included Dilip Kumar. She went on to work with other leading Hindi actors, including Rajendra Kumar in Sasural (1961), Sunil Dutt in Beti Bete (1964) and Shammi Kapoor in Pyaar Kiya To Darna Kya (1963). She also shot a few scenes with Raj Kapoor for Nazrana (1961), but was replaced by Vyjayanthimala after a conflict with the director C. V. Sridhar.

Following the success of Nadodi Mannan, she was also cast opposite the leading Tamil actors of that time: with Gemini Ganesan in Kalyana Parisu (1959), with Sivaji Ganesan in Bhaaga Pirivinai (1959) and again with MGR in Thirudadhe (1961). Her involvement in Tamil films also continued with superhits like Palum Pazhamum (1961), Vazhkai Vazhvatharke (1964), Aalayamani (1962), Periya Idathu Penn (1963), Puthiya Paravai (1964), Panakkara Kudumbam (1964), Enga Veetu Pillai (1965) and Anbe Vaa (1966). The women adored her dressing sense and her saris and blouses, ornaments, hairstyles were copied by girls and women. She came to be known as a "lucky mascot" for MGR films and acted with him in 26 films.The pairing of Sivaji Ganesan and Saroja Devi gave around 20 movies. with Gemini Ganesan she acted in 17 movies. The women adored her dressing sense and her saris and blouses, ornaments, hairstyles were copied by girls and women.

Her early successes in Kannada cinema included Chintamani (1957), School Master (1958) and Jagajyothi Basveshwara (1959). Her performance as a patriotic anti-British queen in the Kannada Kittooru Rani Chennamma (1961) was widely acclaimed. In 1964, she and Kalyan Kumar acted in the first full-fledged Kannada colour movie Amarashilpi Jakanachari (1964).

Saroja Devi in 1965

Saroja Devi also achieved success in Telugu films, starring opposite N. T. Rama Rao in Seetarama Kalyanam (1961), Jagadeka Veeruni Katha (1961) and Dagudu Moothalu (1964). Amara Shilpi Jakkanna (1964), Sakunthala (1966) and Rahasyam (1967).

In subsequent years, however, Saroja Devi learnt the Telugu language. Her Hindi films included Sasural (1961), Opera House (1961), Hong Kong (1962) and Pyaar Kiya To Darna Kya (1963), which became successful. In 1962 she was crowned "Chaturbhaasha Taare", because of her popularity in these four languages.

In 1958, Saroja Devi was booked by M. G. Ramachandran for his second directorial venture Ponniyin Selvan. One of the first screen adaptations of Kalki Krishnamurthy's Ponniyin Selvan, the film had a huge ensemble cast consisting of Vyjayanthimala, Savitri, Gemini Ganesan, Padmini, M. N. Rajam and Nagesh. In the film, she was given the role of Manimekalai princess of Kadamboor and the sister of Kandanmaaran and daughter of Sambuvaraiyar. However, in mid-1958 the film was shelved for unknown reasons.

In the 1960s, Saroja Devi became a fashion icon among the South Indian women, who mimicked her saris, blouses, jewellery, hairstyles and mannerisms. In particular, her saris and jewellery from the Tamil movies Enga Veettu Pillai (1965) and Anbe Vaa (1966) were popularized widely in magazines. Her last film with MGR was Arasa Kattalai (1967), which also starred Jayalalithaa.

Although Saroja Devi and MGR's professional association came to an abrupt end in 1967 following a misunderstanding, their mutual admiration and respect for each other remained intact.

=== Post-marriage career (1968-1997) ===
After 1968, Saroja Devi's career in Tamil cinema gradually declined, and she became more active in Kannada movies.

She continued to paired with Sivaji Ganesan in En Thambi (1968), Anbalippu (1969), Anjal Petti 520 (1969), Arunodhayam (1971), Thenum Paalum (1971), Paarambariyam (1993) and Once More (1997).

She also acted and paired with Gemini Ganesan in Panama Pasama (1968), Thamarai Nenjam (1968), Aindhu Laksham (1969), Thanga Malar (1969), Kula Vilakku (1969), Malathi (1970) and Kann Malar (1970) and Ponmana Selvan (1989).

With Ravichandran Saroja Devi acted in the successful films Odum Nadhi (1969), Snegithi (1970), Malathi (1970), and Pathu Matha Bandham (1974).

With R. Muthuraman, Saroja Devi starred in Arunodhayam (1971), Uyir (1971) and Pathu Matha Bandham (1974), which was her last Tamil film as a lead actor until 1985.

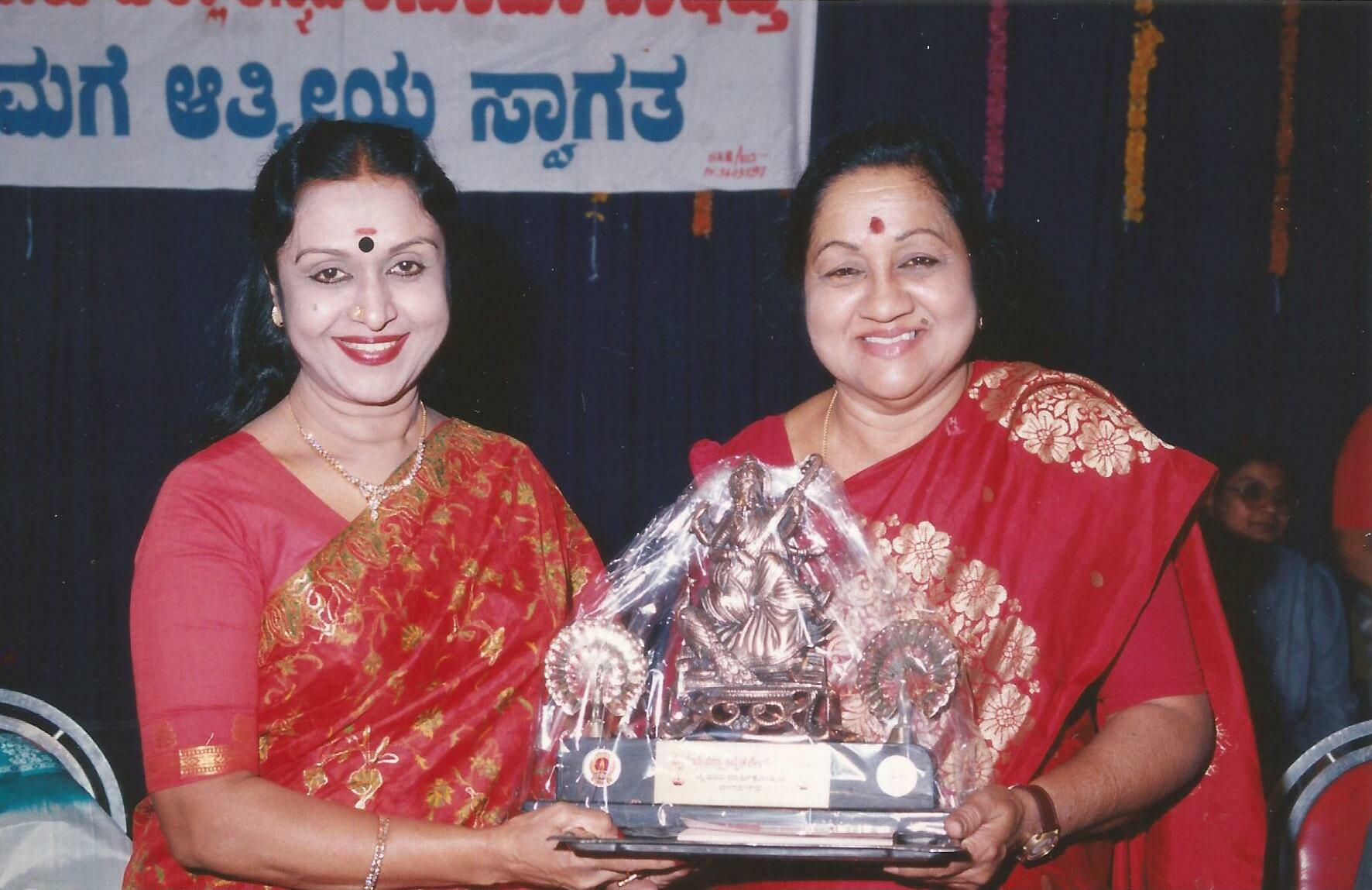
Saroja Devi (left) presenting a State award to noted writer Aryamba Pattabhi

Saroja Devi continued to be among the highest-paid actresses in Kannada and Telugu films. She was cast opposite the leading actor Dr. Rajkumar in several Kannada films, including Mallammana Pavada (1969), Nyayave Devaru (1971), Sri Srinivasa Kalyana (1974), Babruvahana (1977) and Bhagyavantharu (1977). Her other successful films from this period include Thande Makkalu (1971), Papa Punya (1971), Gunavanthudu (1975), Katha Sangama (1976), Sri Renukadevi Mahathme (1977), with Chiranjeevi, then with Vishnuvardhan in Shani Prabhava (1977) and Rudranaga (1984).

In Telugu cinema, Saroja Devi was cast opposite N. T. Rama Rao in films like Bhagya Chakramu (1968), Uma Chandi Gowri Sankarula Katha (1968), Vijayam Manade (1970), Mayani Mamata (1970) and Daana Veera Soora Karna (1979).

In her long career Saroja Devi chiefly opted for romantic films only in the 1960s and later sentimental and socially relevant films right from the late 1960s to the 1980s. Sri Renukadevi Mahathme, a Kannada film released in 1977 was Saroja Devi's 150th film in her career and by 1984, she had completed 161 films as the main lead heroine, without ever playing supporting roles.Yarivanu (1984), in Kannada, was the 161st film, in which she played the main lead heroine.

Saroja Devi signed up for the Kannada film Ladies Hostel in 1985, but stopped shooting after her husband fell ill. He subsequently died in 1986, and she did not shoot or even meet non-family people for one year after his death. She resumed shooting only in 1987. Ladies Hostel proved a successful film, but Saroja Devi refused to sign up for any more films. She completed the eight films that she had accepted before 1986, and these were released during 1987–1990. These included Thaimel Aanai (1988) and Dharma Devan (1989).

After completing her pending projects, Saroja Devi took a break of about five years from films. She returned to acting on the insistence of film producers and her fans, but, contrary to her previous record, she no longer accepted romantic roles. She starred opposite Sivaji Ganesan in Parambariyam (1993) in a lead role as a matron, and then performed a few roles as a supporting actress. In Kannada films, her notable supporting performances included her roles in Anuraga Sangama (1995) and Agni IPS (1997). She and Sivaji Ganesan acted in the Tamil film Once More (1997), which also includes scenes from their 1963 film Iruvar Ullam.

=== Latest roles (1998-2020) ===
In 1998 and 2005, Saroja Devi chaired film juries: the 45th National Film Awards and the 53rd National Film Awards jury. She served as the vice-president of Kannada Chalanchitra Sangha, and as a member of Tirumala Tirupati Devasthanams's local advisory committee. She ran a successful business. She also served as the Chairperson of the Karnataka Film Development Corporation, which had been set up as a private limited company by her and a few other film personalities in 1972.

Saroja Devi was settled in Bengaluru, where she was involved in social work. She organized many donation camps in the name of her husband and her mother. She was also involved with charitable trusts, rehabilitation centres and health programmes.

In 2007, Devi appeared in the short film Prarambha, directed by Santosh Sivan, as part of an HIV/AIDS awareness initiative. The film premiered at the Toronto International Film Festival in 2007 and was screened in India for the first time on 1 December 2007 at the 38th International Film Festival of India.

Her latest film in Tamil was the film Aadhavan (2009), in which she played a judge's mother.

Saroja Devi's last film, Natasaarvabhowma, was released in 2019. Devi acted in around 200 films over seven decades, and was known as "Abhinaya Saraswathi" (Saraswathi of expressions) in Kannada and "Kannadathu Paingili" (Kannada's Parrot) in Tamil. She was known as the first female superstar of Kannada cinema, and was one of the most successful actresses in the history of Indian cinema.

In 2020, she participated in the game show, part of the finale week episode Kodeeswari, hosted by Radhika Sarathkumar.

== Personal life ==
On 1 March 1967, Saroja Devi married Sri Harsha, an engineer, who helped her overcome a financial crisis and income tax problems and taught her how to manage her finances. He also supported Saroja Devi's acting career after they married. When she was asked in an interview why she did not stop acting after her mother's insistence in 1967, she said: "Dilip Kumar once said he has asked Saira Banu to not to stop acting profession. The story was mentioned by Rajesh Khanna to my husband Sri Harsha, not to stop me from acting."

Saroja Devi adopted her niece, Bhuvaneshwari, who died young; she sponsored the Bhuvaneshwari Award for literature in her memory.

== Death ==
Saroja Devi, who suffered from an age-related illness, was found unconscious at her residence in Malleshwaram, Bengaluru, on 14 July 2025. She was rushed to hospital, but doctors confirmed that she had died. She was 87.

== Awards and honours ==
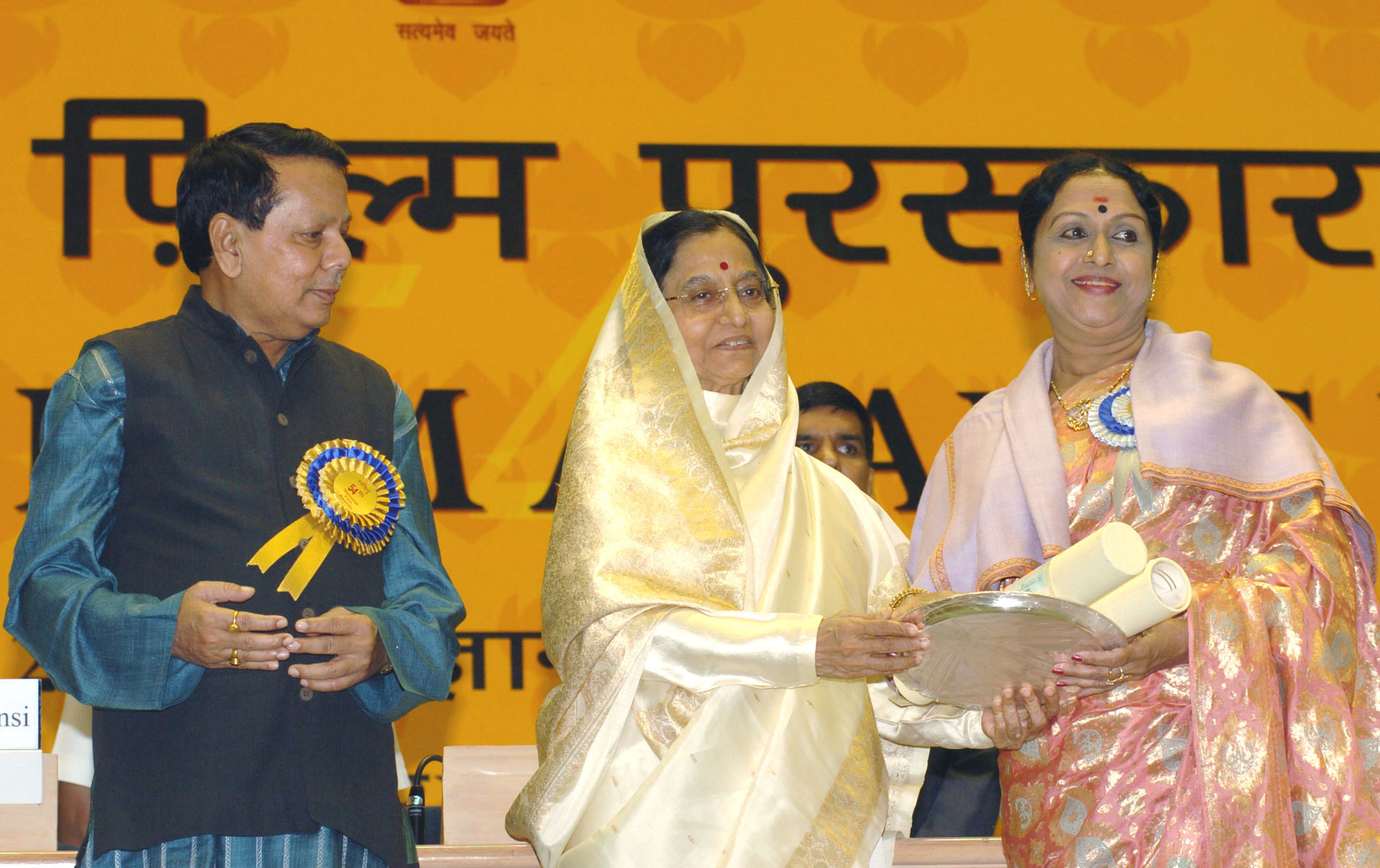
Saroja Devi receiving the Life Time Achievement from the then President of India, Pratibha Patil in 2008

National awards

- 2008 – Lifetime Achievement Award by the Government of India, as a part of the celebrations of India's 60th independence day.
- 1992 – Padma Bhushan
- 1969 – Padma Shri

State awards

- 2009 – Kalaimamani Lifetime achievement award by the Government of Tamil Nadu
- 2009 – Dr. Rajkumar Lifetime Achievement Award by the Government of Karnataka
- 2009 – NTR National Award from Government of Andhra Pradesh
- 2001 – NTR National Award from Andhra Pradesh Government
- 1993 – Tamil Nadu Government's MGR Award
- 1988 – Karnataka Government's Rajyothsava award
- 1980 – Abhinandana-Kanchana Mala award by Karnataka State
- 1969 – Tamil Nadu State Film Award for Best Actress for Kula Vilakku
- 1965 – Abhinya Saraswathy honour by Karnataka

Other awards

- 2009 – Natya Kaladhar Award— Tamil cinema, by Bharat Kalachar Chennai
- 2007 – NTR award for remarkable achievement by Karnataka Telugu Academy
- 2007 – Rotary Sivaji Award by the Charitable Trust and Rotary Club of Chennai
- 2006 – Honorary Doctorate from Bangalore University
- 2006 – Vijay Award for Contribution to Tamil Cinema
- 2003 – Dinakaran award for All-round Achievement
- 1997 – Lifetime achievement awards by Cinema Express in Chennai
- 1994 – Filmfare Lifetime Achievement Award – South

== Legacy ==
In 2010, Bharathiya Vidya Bhavan instituted "Padma Bhushan B. Saroja Devi National Award", a lifetime achievement award to honour artists in the field of performing arts, annually. The recipients of the award including K. J. Yesudas, Vyjayantimala, Anjali Devi, Ambareesh, Jayanthi and others.

In the 2021 Hindi-Tamil bilingual film Thalaivii, actress Regina Cassandra portrayed B. Saroja Devi.
