= Ali Baba 40 Dongalu =

1970 film

- Theatrical release poster
- Directed by: B. Vittalacharya
- Written by: D. V. Narasa Raju (dialogues)
- Based on: Arabian Nights - Alibaba 40 Thieves
- Produced by: N. Ramabrahmam
- Starring: N. T. Rama Rao; Jayalalithaa
- Cinematography: H. S. Venu
- Edited by: Kandaswamy
- Music by: Ghantasala
- Production company: Sri Gowtham Pictures
- Release date: 4 April 1970
- Running time: 179 mins
- Country: India
- Language: Telugu

Ali Baba 40 Dongalu (transl. "Ali Baba and the 40 Thieves") is a 1970 Telugu-language fantasy swashbuckler film directed by B. Vittalacharya. It stars N. T. Rama Rao and Jayalalithaa, with music composed by Ghantasala. The film is produced by N. Ramabrahmam under the Sri Gowtham Pictures banner. The film is based on a story from Arabian Nights called Ali Baba and the Forty Thieves.

== Cast ==
- N. T. Rama Rao as Ali Baba
- Jayalalithaa as Marjiana
- Satyanarayana as Chotu
- Nagabhushanam as Kasim
- Mikkilineni as Sardar
- Allu Ramalingaiah as Vydyudu
- Raja Babu as Sisindri
- Raavi Kondala Rao as Fakirayya
- Suryakantham as Sultana
- Hemalata as Chandbibi
- Rama Prabha as Chilaka

== Soundtrack ==
Alibaba 40 Dongalu

Film score by Ghantasala
- Released: 1970
- Genre: Soundtrack
- Length: 39:19
- Producer: Ghantasala

Ghantasala chronology
| Alibaba 40 Dongalu (1970) | Vijayam Manade (1970) |

Music composed by Ghantasala.

| S. No | Song title | Lyrics | Singers | length |
|---|---|---|---|---|
| 1 | "Chalakaina Chinnadi" | Kosaraju | Ghantasala, P. Susheela | 3:09 |
| 2 | "Siggu Siggu" | C. Narayana Reddy | Ghantasala, P. Susheela | 3:16 |
| 3 | "Alla Yaalla" | Kosaraju | Ghantasala | 2:44 |
| 4 | "Bhaamalo Chandmaamalo" | C. Narayana Reddy | Ghantasala, S. P. Balasubrahmanyam, L. R. Eswari | 8:09 |
| 5 | "Challa Challani" | Dasaradhi | Jayalalitha | 3:16 |
| 6 | "Neelo Nenai" | C. Narayana Reddy | Ghantasala, P. Susheela | 3:35 |
| 7 | "Potti Potti" | C. Narayana Reddy | S. P. Balasubrahmanyam, L. R. Eswari | 3:02 |
| 8 | "Lello Dil Bahaar" | Kosaraju | Ghantasala | 4:02 |
| 9 | "Mari Anthaga" | C. Narayana Reddy | Ghantasala, P. Susheela | 4:23 |
| 10 | "Ravoyi Raalugaayi" | C. Narayana Reddy | P. Susheela | 3:43 |
