= Mayani Mamata =

1970 Indian Telugu-language drama film

- Theatrical release poster
- Directed by: Kamalakara Kameswara Rao
- Written by: Maddipatla Suri; Dr. Korrapati Gangadhara Rao (dialogues)
- Screenplay by: Kamalakara Kameswara Rao
- Story by: Sivalinga
- Produced by: Bhamidipati Bapaiah Panthulu
- Starring: N. T. Rama Rao; B. Saroja Devi; Sobhan Babu
- Cinematography: P. Ellappa
- Edited by: K. A. Marthand
- Music by: Aswattama
- Production company: Bhavani Pictures
- Release date: 13 August 1970
- Running time: 147 mins
- Country: India
- Language: Telugu

Mayani Mamata (transl. Immortal Affection) is a 1970 Indian Telugu-language drama film, produced by Bhamidipati Bapaiah Panthulu under the Bhavani Pictures banner and directed by Kamalakara Kameswara Rao. It stars N. T. Rama Rao, B. Saroja Devi and Sobhan Babu, with music composed by Aswatthama.

== Cast ==
- N. T. Rama Rao as Madhu
- B. Saroja Devi as Jyothi
- Sobhan Babu as Ravi
- Lakshmi as Leela
- Nagabhushanam as Jaganatham
- Dhulipala as Janaki Ramaiah
- Raja Babu as Anandam
- Mukkamala as Kotaiah
- Dr. Sivaramakrishnaiah as Doctor
- Sakshi Ranga Rao as Vivahala Veeraiah
- Kumari Rukmini as Ammayamma
- Tyagaraju as Naagu
- Saradhi as Ramajogi
- KK Sarma as Panakaalu
- Hemalatha as Shanthamma
- Rama Prabha as Lachamma
- Chalapathi Rao

== Soundtrack ==
Mayani Mamata

Film score by Aswatthama
- Released: 1970
- Genre: Soundtrack
- Producer: Aswatthama

Music composed by Aswatthama.

S. No.	Song title	Lyrics	Singers	length
1	"Yevaro Vachche Velaye"	Sri Sri	P. Susheela	2:56
2	"Ee Bhrathuke Oka Aata"	Sri Sri	S. P. Balasubrahmanyam, Vasantha	3:46
3	"Kanulu Maatalaadunani"	C. Narayana Reddy	Ghantasala, P. Susheela	3:54
4	"Oo Orori Chinnoda"	Sri Sri	Pithapuram, L. R. Eswari	
5	"Anagnagaa Maharaju"	C. Narayana Reddy	P. Susheela	6:47
6	"Yemaithivi Priyasakhi"	C. Narayana Reddy	Ghantasala	
7	"Raanika Nee Kosam"	Devulapalli	Ghantasala	3:53
8	"Udayaana Vaasava Daththa"	C. Narayana Reddy	Ghantasala, P. Susheela, Ramana	8:35
9	"Kallu Therachi"	Kosaraju	Ghantasala	3:08
