= Vijayam Manade =

- Theatrical release poster
- Directed by: B. Vittalacharya
- Written by: Vituri (dialogues)
- Screenplay by: B. Vittalacharya
- Story by: Rajendra Arts Productions Unit
- Produced by: N. Sambasiva Rao
- Starring: N. T. Rama Rao; B. Saroja Devi
- Cinematography: H. S. Venu
- Edited by: G. D. Joshi; Siva Murthy
- Music by: Ghantasala
- Production company: Rajendra Arts Productions
- Release date: 15 July 1970
- Running time: 163 minutes
- Country: India
- Language: Telugu

Vijayam Manade (transl. Victory is Ours) is a 1970 Indian Telugu-language film, produced by N. Sambasiva Rao under the Rajendra Arts Productions banner and directed by B. Vittalacharya. It stars N. T. Rama Rao and B. Saroja Devi, with music composed by Ghantasala.

== Cast ==
- N. T. Rama Rao as Pratap
- B. Saroja Devi as Padmini Devi
- Satyanarayana as Ajay Simhudu
- Mikkilineni as Vishnuvardhana Maharaju
- Mukkamala as Nagendra Varma
- Sridhar as Papanna
- Nagesh as Sainyasi
- Balakrishna as Suprabhatham
- Jagga Rao as Ranadheer
- Devika as Madhavi
- Santha Kumari as Ajay's mother
- Jyothi Lakshmi as Dancer
- Meena Kumari as Parijatham

== Soundtrack ==
Vijayam Manade

Film score by Ghantasala
- Released: 1970
- Genre: Soundtrack
- Length: 24:28
- Producer: Ghantasala

Ghantasala chronology
Ali Baba 40 Dongalu (1970)	Vijayam Manade (1970)	Thalli Thandrulu (1970)

Music composed by Ghantasala.

S. No.	Song title	Lyrics	Singers	length
1	"Oho Ho Rythannaa"	C. Narayana Reddy	Ghantasala, S. Janaki	4:14
2	"Sannajaaji Poolupetti"	C. Narayana Reddy	S. Janaki	3:37
3	"Oh Devi"	C. Narayana Reddy	Ghantasala, P. Susheela	3:57
4	"Sreerasthu Chinnari"	Devulapalli	Ghantasala	4:15
5	"Naa Madhilo Vundhoka"	C. Narayana Reddy	Ghantasala, P. Susheela	3:25
6	"Yelukora Veeraadhi Veera"	Vituri	S. Janaki	5:00
7	"Garadi Garadi Bale Bale Garadi"	Kosaraju	Ghantasala, Suseela	3.35
