= S. Maruti Rao =

Indian cinematographer

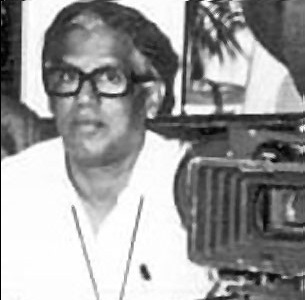
- Born: 25 April 1921; Thanjavur, Tamil Nadu, British India
- Died: 2000 (aged 78–79)
- Occupations: Cinematographer, Photographer

Shelkey Maruti Rao (25 April 1921–2000) was an Indian cinematographer who worked mainly in Tamil films.

== Career ==
=== Cinematography ===
Rao was born in Thanjavur on 25 April 1921. He became interested in photography as a student. He carried his camera to school regularly. Impressed by his interest in photography, his neighbour, N. C. Pillai, the-then editor of Flash magazine, asked if he would be interested in joining cinema. With permission from his parents, Rao enlisted as an apprentice in Pragajothi Films in 1940 for Choodamani, a Telugu film. The film's main cinematographer was Mama Shinde.

His next assignment was the Tamil film Kalamegam, directed by Ellis R. Dungan. He worked as assistant under Marcus Bartley. He later moved to Vel Pictures in Guindy and worked on the film Bhakthi Mala. The cinematographer was impressed with Rao's work, and took him on as first assistant and gave him the responsibility of handling the Mitchell camera.

After World War II, Rao joined Pragathi Studio and was the still photographer for Sri Valli, produced by A. V. Meiyappan. When Meiyappan moved to Karaikudi, Rao got to work as still photographer and first photographer for R. N. Nagendra Rao's Mahathma Kabir. When the film's German photographer left, Rao completed the film.

When Meiyappan returned from Karaikudi, Rao worked as second photographer and as manager of the still department. During the making of P. Neelakandan's Or Iravu, Rao worked for the first time as the main cinematographer and his cinematography received widespread acclaim. He went on to work in as many as 60 films: 34 in Tamil, 13 in Hindi, eight in Kannada and five in Telugu. He was the make-up test photographer for actors like Sivaji Ganesan, S. V. Subbiah, Vyjayanthimala and Hema Malini before they entered cinema.

=== Other work ===
Besides cinematography, Rao produced several television serials and documentaries. He also served as an honorary member of Tamil Nadu Public Service Commission, and the Selection Committee Chairman for the Film and Television Institute of India.

== Select filmography ==
- Or Iravu (1951)
- Parasakthi (1952)
- Andha Naal (1954)
- Annai (1962)
- Kunkhumam (1963)
- Server Sundaram (1964)
- Anbe Vaa (1966)
- Athey Kangal(1967)
- Enga Mama (1970)
- Engal Thangam (1970)
