= Madhavapeddi Satyam =

Indian playback singer

- Born: 11 May 1922
- Origin: Brahmanakoduru, Madras Presidency, British India
- Died: 18 December 2000 (aged 78)
- Genre: Playback singing
- Occupations: Singer, Actor
- Instrument: Vocals (Baritone)
- Years active: 1946–2000

Madhavapeddi Satyam (11 March 1922 – 18 December 2000) was an Indian playback singer and actor who predominantly worked in Telugu cinema.

He entered films as a singer-actor in Y. V. Rao's Tamil-Hindi bilingual movie Ramadas in the year 1946, playing the role of Kabir. However, he became more popular as a playback singer due to his booming voice. His voice suited artists like S. V. Ranga Rao, Relangi and Ramana Reddy. He also sang for others like Akkineni Nageswara Rao, N.T. Rama Rao, Jaggayya and Padmanabham.

In a five-decade long career, he sang innumerable songs including popular ones like "Vivaha Bhojanambu" from the film Mayabazar (1957) for S. V. Ranga Rao, and "Ayyayyo Chethilo Dabbulu Poyene" from the film Kulagothralu (1961) for Ramana Reddy. Noted music composer in 1990s Telugu films, Sri Madhavapeddi Suresh is a close relative of Sri Madhavapeddi Satyam.

== Biography ==
Madhavapeddi Satyam was born on 11 March 1922 at Brahmanakoduru village in Ponnur, Andhra Pradesh. He is the son of Sri Madhavapeddi Lakshmi Narasayya and Late Smt. Sundaramma.

Noted music composer in 1990s Telugu films, Sri Madhavapeddi Suresh is a close relative of Sri Madhavapeddi Satyam.

From his childhood he showed talent for singing and acting in dramas, inspiration being his paternal uncle Sri Madhavapeddi Venkatramayya, a well noted dramatist. He started portraying different roles in drama and one of them "Chalo Delhi" a social drama in which his singing, acting and music calibre was brought out for the first time in Madras (now Chennai). Spotted by director-producer Y.V. Rao in 1946, Satyam was fortunate to get an opportunity to act as Kabir in Y.V. Rao's film Ramadas and singing three songs in this bilingual film in Tamil and Hindi under the musical supervision of C.R. Subbaraman.

Immediately followed his entry into the Telugu film industry with his first Telugu song "Manasu Gaadha Khudha Thodai..." with Sri Ghantasala for the film Laila Majnu in the year 1949. He sang for S. V. Ranga Rao in Mayabazar and it was well received by audience.

He died in Chennai on 18 December 2000, at the age of 78.

== Filmography ==
=== Playback Singer ===
| Year | Film | Language | Song | Music director | Co-singer |
|---|---|---|---|---|---|
| 1946 | Ramadasu | Tamil | | | |
| 1949 | Laila Majnu | Tamil | Maghimaiyodu Sadhaa Ezhai | C. R. Subburaman | Ghantasala & S. Dakshinamurthi |
| 1949 | Laila Majnu | Telugu | Manasu Gadaa Khudaa | C. R. Subburaman | Ghantasala & S. Dakshinamurthi |
| 1950 | Shavukaru | Telugu | | Ghantasala | |
| 1951 | Anni | Tamil | Aiyaa Ezhai Yaarumillaadha | Pendyala Nageswara Rao | M. Sarojini |
| 1951 | Dheeksha | Telugu | | Pendyala Nageswara Rao | M. Sarojini |
| 1951 | Malliswari | Telugu | Bhalira | S. Rajeswara Rao | |
| 1951 | Navvite Navaratnalu | Telugu | | C. R. Subburaman | |
| 1952 | Achan | Malayalam | Pon Makane | P. S. Divakar | A. M. Rajah & Kaviyoor Revamma |
| 1952 | Palletooru | Telugu | | Ghantasala | |
| 1952 | Penn Manam | Tamil | Vetri Vetri Vetri | Kunnakudi Venkatarama Iyer | T. A. Mothi & A. P. Komala |
| 1952 | Penn Manam | Tamil | Vazhvile Vaazhvile | Kunnakudi Venkatarama Iyer | M. L. Vasanthakumari |
| 1953 | Kanna Talli | Telugu | Saaramuleni Samsaram | Pendyala Nageswara Rao | |
| 1953 | Ulagam | Tamil | Thuyarutraeh Ennai Nee Enraaye | M. S. Gnanamani | |
| 1953 | Pichi Pullayya | Telugu | Sokapu Thuphanu | T. V. Raju | |
| 1953 | Pichi Pullayya | Telugu | Yelanoie | T. V. Raju | |
| 1953 | Petra Thai | Tamil | Saaram Illaadha Samsaaram Thanile | Pendyala Nageswara Rao | |
| 1954 | Aggi Ramudu | Telugu | Jai Aamdhrajananee | S. M. Subbaiah Naidu | A. M. Rajah & P. A. Periyanayaki |
| 1954 | Annadata | Telugu | | P. Adinarayana Rao | |
| 1954 | Bangaru Papa | Telugu | Tadhimi Takadhimi Tolubomma | Addepalli Rama Rao | |
| 1954 | Chandraharam | Tamil | Edhu Seidhaal Adhu | Ghantasala | |
| 1954 | Chandraharam | Tamil | Unakku Neeye Thunai Endre | Ghantasala | |
| 1954 | Chandraharam | Telugu | Neeku Neeve Thodugaa | Ghantasala | |
| 1954 | Iddaru Pellalu | Telugu | Kantilo Nalakayu | T. R. Pappa, T. K. Kumara Swamy & T. A. Kalyanam | |
| 1954 | Manohara | Telugu | Thivari Ramuni | S. V. Venkatraman | |
| 1954 | Parivartana | Telugu | Nandare Lokamento Chitramura | T. Chalapathi Rao | |
| 1954 | Parivartana | Telugu | Randoi Raarandoi | T. Chalapathi Rao | |
| 1954 | Sangham | Telugu | Nidurinchedi | R. Sudharsanam | |
| 1954 | Sangham | Telugu | Dimikita Dimikita | R. Sudharsanam | |
| 1954 | Raju Peda | Telugu | | S. Rajeswara Rao | |
| 1954 | Snehaseema | Malayalam | Vannu Vannu Christmas | V. Dakshinamoorthy | A. M. Rajah |
| 1955 | Kanyasulkam | Telugu | Keechaka Vadha | Ghantasala | N. L. Ganasaraswathi |
| 1955 | Mangaiyar Thilakam | Tamil | Nee Varavillaiyenil Aadharavedhu | S. Dakshinamurthi | |
| 1955 | Vadina | Telugu | Anandam Indegaladitu Choodandi | R. Sudharsanam & G. Aswathama | P. Susheela |
| 1955 | Vadina | Telugu | Jojo Jojo Laali | R. Sudharsanam & G. Aswathama | P. Susheela |
| 1955 | Vadina | Telugu | Desamlo Velige | R. Sudharsanam & G. Aswathama | |
| 1955 | Vadina | Telugu | Nadakalo Tippuloddanta | R. Sudharsanam & G. Aswathama | |
| 1955 | Vadina | Telugu | Veyyaloyi Topi Veyyaloyi | R. Sudharsanam & G. Aswathama | |
| 1956 | Bhagyodaya | Kannada | Idhey Idhina Kaala Reethi | L. Malleswara Rao | |
| 1956 | Charana Daasi | Telugu | Nede Kadaa | S. Rajeswara Rao | K. Rani |
| 1956 | Charana Daasi | Telugu | Badilee | S. Rajeswara Rao | |
| 1956 | Chintamani | Telugu | Inta Rambhalavanti | Addepalli Rama Rao & T. V. Raju | |
| 1956 | Chintamani | Telugu | Kaligin Bhagyamunellanu | Addepalli Rama Rao & T. V. Raju | |
| 1956 | Chintamani | Telugu | Tatalanati Kshetramulella | Addepalli Rama Rao & T. V. Raju | |
| 1956 | Chintamani | Telugu | Naluvura Nota | Addepalli Rama Rao & T. V. Raju | |
| 1956 | Chintamani | Telugu | Nanu Devendruniga | Addepalli Rama Rao & T. V. Raju | |
| 1956 | Chintamani | Telugu | Vidichiti Bandhuvargamula | Addepalli Rama Rao & T. V. Raju | |
| 1956 | Chiranjeevulu | Telugu | Raamanamanu Mitaayi | Ghantasala | |
| 1956 | Edi Nijam | Telugu | Edi Nijam Manavudaa Edi Nijam | Master Venu | Ghantasala |
| 1956 | Ilavelpu | Telugu | Gampa Gaiyalli | S. Dakshinamurthi | P. Leela |
| 1956 | Tenali Ramakrishna | Telugu | Tenali Ramakrishna | Viswanathan–Ramamoorthy | Ghantasala |
| 1956 | Tenali Ramakrishna | Telugu | Ichchakaalu Neeku | Viswanathan–Ramamoorthy | P. Leela |
| 1956 | Uma Sundari | Telugu | Raaku Raaku | G. Aswathama | Sathyavathi |
| 1957 | Bhagya Rekha | Telugu | Manasaa Thelusaa | Pendyala Nageswara Rao | |
| 1957 | Bhagya Rekha | Telugu | Lokam Gammathuraa | Pendyala Nageswara Rao | Satyavathi |
| 1957 | Bhagya Rekha | Telugu | Ek Buddi Aathanaa | Pendyala Nageswara Rao | Satyavathi |
| 1957 | Kutumba Gowravam | Telugu | Soda Beedi Beeda | Viswanathan–Ramamoorthy | |
| 1957 | Kutumba Gowravam | Telugu | Rayyudori Intikada | Viswanathan–Ramamoorthy | P. Leela |
| 1957 | Maya Bazaar | Kannada | Vivaaha Bhojanavidu | Ghantasala | |
| 1957 | Maya Bazaar | Kannada | Bhale Bhale Bhale Deva | Ghantasala | |
| 1957 | Maya Bazaar | Kannada | Aaha Nan Madhuve Yante | Ghantasala | Swarnalatha |
| 1957 | Maya Bazaar | Kannada | Swagathavayya | Ghantasala | P. Susheela |
| 1957 | Maya Bazaar | Telugu | Vivaha Bhojanambu | Ghantasala | |
| 1957 | Maya Bazaar | Telugu | Bhali Bhali Bhali Deva | Ghantasala | |
| 1957 | Panduranga Mahatyam | Telugu | Chebithe Vintivaa Guru Guru | T. V. Raju | Pithapuram Nageswara Rao |
| 1957 | Panduranga Mahatyam | Telugu | Tholu Thitthi Idhi | T. V. Raju | Pithapuram Nageswara Rao |
| 1957 | Sarangadhara | Telugu | Raajipudu Raaledu | Ghantasala | |
| 1957 | Sarangadhara | Telugu | O Chinna Vaada | Ghantasala | Swarnalata |
| 1957 | Sati Anasuya | Telugu | Enthentha Dooram | Ghantasala | K. Rani |
| 1957 | Sati Anasuya | Telugu | Ide Nyayama Ide Dharmama | Ghantasala | Ghantasala & J. V. Raghavulu |
| 1957 | Sati Savitri | Telugu | Siri Siri Muvvavuga | S. V. Venkatraman | Udutha Sarojini |
| 1957 | Sati Savitri | Telugu | Adhaarmikula | S. V. Venkatraman | |
| 1957 | Thodi Kodallu | Telugu | Nee Shoku Choodakunda | Master Venu | Jikki |
| 1957 | Veguchukka | Telugu | Thempunnadi | Vedha | Ghantasala, P. B. Sreenivas & Pithapuram Nageswara Rao |
| 1957 | Vinayaka Chaviti | Telugu | | Ghantasala | |
| 1958 | Aada Pettanam | Telugu | | Master Venu & S. Rajeswara Rao | |
| 1958 | Anna Thammudu | Telugu | Vayasumallina Vanneladi | G. Aswatthama | Ghantasala |
| 1958 | Atha Okinti Kodale | Telugu | Buddhochenaa Neeku Manasaa | Pendyala Nageswara Rao | |
| 1958 | Booloka Rambha | Telugu | O Babu O Amma, Erragiri Vaasulam | C. N. Pandurangan | K. Rani |
| 1958 | Chenchu Lakshmi | Tamil | Lambaadi Lambaadi Hoi Lambaadi | S. Rajeswara Rao | Jikki |
| 1958 | Karthavarayuni Katha | Telugu | Namasthe Namasthe | G. Ramanathan & G. Aswathama | Satyavathi |
| 1958 | Karthavarayuni Katha | Telugu | Meesala Rosayyo | G. Ramanathan & G. Aswathama | A. G. Rathnamala |
| 1958 | Karthavarayuni Katha | Telugu | Sangili Giligili | G. Ramanathan & G. Aswathama | Ghantasala & T. G. Kamala Devi |
| 1958 | Manchi Manasuku Manchi Rojulu | Telugu | Manchi Manasu | Ghantasala | P. Susheela |
| 1958 | Mangalya Balam | Telugu | Chekkili Meeda | Master Venu | Jikki |
| 1958 | Mangalya Balam | Telugu | My Dear Meena | Master Venu | Jikki |
| 1958 | Mundhadugu | Telugu | Kodekaaru Chinnavaadaa | K. V. Mahadevan | S. Janaki |
| 1958 | Mundhadugu | Telugu | Chinadhanaa Ye Chinadhanaa | K. V. Mahadevan | |
| 1958 | Shree Krishna Gaarudi | Kannada | Bhale Bhale Garudi | Pendyala Nageswara Rao | |
| 1958 | Sri Krishna Maya | Telugu | Vayyari Nannu Cheri | T. V. Raju | S. Janaki |
| 1958 | Veettukku Vandha Varalakshmi | Tamil | Indha Logam Tamaashudaa | Pendyala Nageswara Rao | P. S. Vaidhegi |
| 1958 | Veettukku Vandha Varalakshmi | Tamil | Ek Buddi Aathanaa | Pendyala Nageswara Rao | P. S. Vaidhegi |
| 1959 | Banda Ramudu | Telugu | Merabuchi Donga | S. Dakshinamurthi & N. D. V. Prasada Rao | |
| 1959 | Bhakta Ambareesha | Telugu | | L. Malleswara Rao | |
| 1959 | Illarikam | Telugu | Chetulu Kalasina Chappatlu | T. Chalapathi Rao | Ghantasala & P. Susheela |
| 1959 | Illarikam | Telugu | Bhale Chancele | T. Chalapathi Rao | |
| 1959 | Jayabheri | Telugu | Unnaaraa Jodunnaaraa | Pendyala Nageswara Rao | P. Susheela, Ghantasala & Pithapuram Nageswara Rao |
| 1959 | Jayabheri | Telugu | Hoy Vallo Padalira | Pendyala Nageswara Rao | S. Janaki & Ghantasala |
| 1959 | Krishna Leelalu | Telugu | | S. Dakshinamurthi | |
| 1959 | Raja Malaya Simha | Telugu | Magamu Choosi | Viswanathan–Ramamoorthy | Pithapuram Nageswara Rao |
| 1959 | Raja Malaya Simha | Telugu | Jaya Jaya Bhaaratha Veerudaa | Viswanathan–Ramamoorthy | |
| 1959 | Raja Malaya Simha | Telugu | Oranna Mosappukaalam | Viswanathan–Ramamoorthy | P. B. Sreenivas & G. K. Venkatesh |
| 1959 | Raja Malaya Simha | Telugu | Jingilijikki Jingilijikki | Viswanathan–Ramamoorthy | K. Jamuna Rani |
| 1959 | Rechukka Pagatichukka | Telugu | Bhala Bhale Devuda | T. V. Raju | Pithapuram Nageswara Rao |
| 1959 | Sathi Sukanya | Telugu | Sapasa Vraththi | Ghantasala | P. Leela |
| 1960 | Abhimanam | Telugu | Mandhini Ninnu | Ghantasala | J. V. Raghavulu |
| 1960 | Bhakta Raghunath | Telugu | Narahari Bhojana | Pendyala Nageswara Rao & P. Suri Babu | K. Rani |
| 1960 | Bhakta Raghunath | Telugu | Aa Maatante | Pendyala Nageswara Rao & P. Suri Babu | P. Susheela |
| 1960 | Bhatti Vikramarka | Telugu | Jaire Jambhaire Okasari | Pendyala Nageswara Rao | Jikki |
| 1960 | Bhatti Vikramarka | Telugu | Satyamayaa Guruda Nityamayaa | Pendyala Nageswara Rao | |
| 1960 | Deepavali | Telugu | Namo Narayanaya | Pendyala Nageshwara Rao | Ghantasala & A. P. Komala |
| 1960 | Deepavali | Telugu | Dayadulaina | Pendyala Nageshwara Rao | |
| 1960 | Deepavali | Telugu | Devajathiki Priyamu | Pendyala Nageshwara Rao | |
| 1960 | Deepavali | Telugu | Paalutrage Nepamuna | Pendyala Nageshwara Rao | |
| 1960 | Deepavali | Telugu | Kamsa Bhitini | Pendyala Nageshwara Rao | |
| 1960 | Devanthakudu | Telugu | Dharma Devata | G. Aswathama | |
| 1960 | Maa Babu | Telugu | Srimathigaru | T. Chalapathi Rao | |
| 1960 | Nammina Bantu | Telugu | Andala Bomma | S. Rajeswara Rao & Master Venu | Jikki |
| 1960 | Nammina Bantu | Telugu | Ghama Ghama Ghamayinchu | S. Rajeswara Rao & Master Venu | P. Leela |
| 1960 | Nammina Bantu | Telugu | Topi Najooku Techu Topi | S. Rajeswara Rao & Master Venu | |
| 1960 | Raja Makutam | Telugu | Kanta Paini Aasa | Master Venu | Mallik |
| 1960 | Sahasra Siracheda Apoorva Chinthamani | Telugu | | K. V. Mahadevan | |
| 1960 | Sri Venkateswara Mahatyam | Telugu | Kannula | Pendyala Nageshwara Rao | |
| 1960 | Sri Venkateswara Mahatyam | Telugu | Namo Narayanaya | Pendyala Nageshwara Rao | |
| 1960 | Sri Venkateswara Mahatyam | Telugu | Sakala Kalyanabhusha | Pendyala Nageshwara Rao | |
| 1960 | Sri Venkateswara Mahatyam | Telugu | Vega Raava | Pendyala Nageshwara Rao | |
| 1960 | Sri Venkateswara Mahatyam | Telugu | Pahihare | Pendyala Nageshwara Rao | |
| 1960 | Sri Venkateswara Mahatyam | Telugu | Padave Podamu Gouri | Pendyala Nageshwara Rao | |
| 1960 | Vimala | Telugu | Yerra Yeeradana | S. M. Subbaiah Naidu | A. P. Komala |
| 1961 | Bhakta Jayadeva | Telugu | | S. Rajeswara Rao | |
| 1961 | Bharya Bhartalu | Telugu | Kanakamma Chitti | S. Rajeswara Rao | Swarnalatha |
| 1961 | Iddaru Mitrulu | Telugu | Srirama | S. Rajeswara Rao | |
| 1961 | Jagadeka Veeruni Katha | Telugu | Koppuninda Poovuleme | Pendyala Nageswara Rao | Swarnalata |
| 1961 | Indrajeet (Sati Sulochana) | Telugu | | T. V. Raju | |
| 1961 | Pendli Pilupu | Telugu | Niganigalaade Chirunavvu | K. Prasad Rao | S. Janaki |
| 1961 | Sabhash Raja | Telugu | Adurika Ledae | Ghantasala | S. Janaki |
| 1961 | Usha Parinayam | Telugu | Devaa Hara Hara... Jaya Mahadeva Shambo | S. Hanumantha Rao | P. Leela |
| 1962 | Bhishma | Telugu | Emanuvaru | S. Rajeswara Rao | |
| 1962 | Chitti Tammudu | Telugu | Ayyo Rama Ayyo Rama | Pendyala Nageswara Rao | Swarnalatha |
| 1962 | Dakshayagnam | Telugu | Namo Namo Nadaraja | S. Hanumantha Rao | |
| 1962 | Dakshayagnam | Telugu | Pasuvaa | S. Hanumantha Rao | |
| 1962 | Dakshayagnam | Telugu | Girija Kalyanam | S. Hanumantha Rao | P. Suribabu, Raghuramaiah & P. Susheela |
| 1962 | Gaali Medalu | Telugu | O Raayudo | T. G. Lingappa | S. Janaki |
| 1962 | Kalimilemulu | Telugu | Cheyyaku Dubara | G. Aswattama | B. Vasantha |
| 1962 | Khaidi Kannayya | Telugu | Premaku Kanuka Kavalena | Rajan–Nagendra | P. Susheela |
| 1962 | Kula Gothralu | Telugu | Ayyayyo Jebulo Dabbulu Poyene | S. Rajeswara Rao | Relangi |
| 1962 | Kula Gothralu | Telugu | Maama Sathru Bhayankara (Padyalu) | S. Rajeswara Rao | |
| 1962 | Padandi Munduku | Telugu | Padandi Munduku Padandi Tosuku | S. P. Kodandapani | Ghantasala & A. P. Komala |
| 1962 | Padandi Munduku | Telugu | Meluko Saagipo Bandhanalu Tenchuko | S. P. Kodandapani | Ghantasala & A. P. Komala |
| 1962 | Tiger Ramudu | Telugu | Mohini Bhasmasura | Ghantasala | P. S. Vaideghi |
| 1963 | Chaduvukunna Ammayilu | Telugu | Emitee Avataram | S. Rajeswara Rao | Swarnalatha |
| 1963 | Irugu Porugu | Telugu | Kavvinchevu Kavvinchevu | Master Venu | Swarnalatha |
| 1963 | Lakshadhikari | Telugu | Oho Andamaina Chinnadana | T. Chalapathi Rao | |
| 1963 | Lakshadhikari | Telugu | Addhala Meda Undhi | T. Chalapathi Rao | Ghantasala & K. Jamuna Rani |
| 1963 | Lava Kusa | Kannada | Ashvamedha Yagaaikkeega Jayamu Jayamu Jayamu | Ghantasala | Ghantasala, J. V. Raghavulu, P. S. Vaideghi & K. Rani |
| 1963 | Lava Kusa | Telugu | Ashwamedha Yagaaniki Jayamu Jayamu Jayamu | Ghantasala | Ghantasala, J. V. Raghavulu, P. S. Vaideghi & K. Rani |
| 1963 | Narthanasala | Telugu | | S. Dakshinamurthi | |
| 1963 | Savati Koduku | Telugu | Yemi Sogasu | C. Satyam | Rama |
| 1963 | Sri Krishnarjuna Yuddhamu | Telugu | | Pendyala Nageswara Rao | |
| 1963 | Sri Ramanjaneya Yuddha | Kannada | Vaanaranu Vaaridhiya | C. Satyam | |
| 1963 | Valmiki | Telugu | Pothanantade | Ghantasala | A. P. Komala & J. V. Raghavulu |
| 1964 | Amara Silpi Jakkanna | Telugu | | S. Rajeswara Rao | |
| 1964 | Amarashilpi Jakanachari | Kannada | | S. Rajeswara Rao | |
| 1964 | Babruvahana | Telugu | | Paamarthi | |
| 1964 | Ramadasu | Telugu | Ee Desama Nununduvaru | G. Aswathama & V. Nagayya | Seerkazhi Govindarajan & V. N. Sundharam |
| 1964 | Ramadasu | Telugu | Ramadasugaru | G. Aswathama & V. Nagayya | |
| 1964 | Ramadasu | Telugu | Ye Desam | G. Aswathama & V. Nagayya | |
| 1964 | Bobbili Yudham | Telugu | | S. Rajeswara Rao | |
| 1964 | Desa Drohulu | Telugu | Sagamapa Gari | S. Rajeswara Rao | S. Janaki |
| 1964 | Desa Drohulu | Telugu | Mana Swatantra Bharatham | S. Rajeswara Rao | Ghantasala |
| 1964 | Dr. Chakravarthy | Telugu | O Ungarala Mungurula Raja | S. Rajeswara Rao | P. Susheela |
| 1964 | Kalavari Kodalu | Telugu | Nee Sogase | T. Chalapathi Rao | Pithapuram Nageswara Rao |
| 1964 | Manchi Manishi | Telugu | Ponnakayavanti Police | S. Rajeswara Rao & T. Chalapathi Rao | S. Janaki |
| 1964 | Manchi Manishi | Telugu | Dopidi Dopidi Dopidi | S. Rajeswara Rao & T. Chalapathi Rao | Pithapuram Nageswara Rao |
| 1964 | Mane Aliya | Kannada | Bhale Chanside | T. Chalapathi Rao | |
| 1964 | Navagraha Pooja Mahima | Telugu | Ravana Padam | S. P. Kothandapani | L. V. Krishana, P. B. Sreenivas & Swarnalata |
| 1964 | Ramudu Bheemudu | Telugu | Saradaa Saradaa Cigarette | Pendyala Nageswara Rao | K. Jamuna Rani |
| 1964 | Ramudu Bheemudu | Telugu | Thaguna Idi Mama | Pendyala Nageswara Rao | Ghantasala |
| 1964 | Server Sundaram | Telugu | Parabrahma | Viswanathan–Ramamoorthy | L. R. Eswari & Pithapuram Nageswara Rao |
| 1964 | Sri Satyanarayana Mahathyam | Telugu | Navvala Edvaala | Ghantasala | |
| 1964 | Sri Satyanarayana Mahathyam | Telugu | Uppu Pappu | Ghantasala | |
| 1964 | Sri Tirupatamma Katha | Telugu | Po Pora Mamayah | Pamarthi | K. Rani |
| 1964 | Velugu Needalu | Telugu | Siva Govinda Govinda | Pendyala Nageswara Rao | |
| 1964 | Velugu Needalu | Telugu | Bhale Bhale | Pendyala Nageswara Rao | Ghantasala |
| 1965 | Antastulu | Telugu | Aa Devudu Manishiga | K. V. Mahadevan | Pithapuram Nageswara Rao |
| 1965 | Devatha | Telugu | Naaku Neeve Kaavalera | S. P. Kodandapani | S. Janaki |
| 1965 | Mangamma Sapatham | Telugu | Aavooru Needikadu | T. V. Raju | Swarnalatha |
| 1965 | Pandava Vanavasam | Telugu | Daaruni Raajya Sampada | Ghantasala | |
| 1965 | Prameelarjuneeyam | Telugu | Cheppandi Chuddam | Pendyala Nageswara Rao | Pithapuram Nageswara Rao & Swarnalata |
| 1965 | Prameelarjuneeyam | Telugu | Bhama Bhamakoka | Pendyala Nageswara Rao | Swarnalata |
| 1965 | Prameelarjuneeyam | Telugu | Ghana Kurukshetra | Pendyala Nageswara Rao | P. Leela |
| 1965 | Satya Harishchandra | Telugu | Kulamulo Yemundira | Pendyala Nageswara Rao | |
| 1965 | Veerabhimanyu | Telugu | | K. V. Mahadevan | |
| 1965 | Bheema Prathigyna | Telugu | | G. Devarajan | |
| 1966 | Aggi Barata | Telugu | Churuku Churuku | Vijaya Krishna Murthy | L. R. Eswari |
| 1966 | Bhimanjaneya Yuddham | Telugu | | T. V. Raju | |
| 1966 | Monagallaku Monagadu | Telugu | Thellari | Vedha | P. Susheela |
| 1966 | Monagallaku Monagadu | Telugu | Vachame Nee Kosam | Vedha | P. B. Sreenivas & P. Susheela |
| 1966 | Palnati Yuddham | Telugu | | S. Rajeswara Rao | |
| 1966 | Pidugu Ramudu | Telugu | Nindu Manasa | T. V. Raju | L. R. Eswari |
| 1966 | Potti Pleader | Telugu | Andamannadi Neelo Chudali | S. P. Kodandapani | S. Janaki & Pithapuram Nageswara Rao |
| 1966 | Rangula Ratnam | Telugu | Desa Bhaktulam Memandi | S. Rajeswara Rao & B. Gopalam | Pithapuram Nageswara Rao |
| 1966 | Sakunthala | Telugu | Paathaa Kaalam Naati | Ghantasala | Pithapuram Nageswara Rao & J. V. Raghavulu |
| 1966 | Srikakula Andhra Maha Vishnu Katha | Telugu | Mohana Ramanuda | Pendyala Nageswara Rao | B. Vasantha |
| 1966 | Sri Krishna Pandaveeyam | Telugu | Bhala Bhala Naa Bandi | T. V. Raju | |
| 1967 | Aada Paduchu | Telugu | Prema Pakshulam | T. Chalapathi Rao | B. Vasantha |
| 1967 | Beedi Basavanna | Kannada | Angaile Aagasa Thoro | T. G. Lingappa | S. Janaki |
| 1967 | Beedi Basavanna | Kannada | Bhale Chanside | T. G. Lingappa | |
| 1967 | Bhakta Prahlada | Telugu | Bhujashakthi Nathoda | S. Rajeswara Rao | |
| 1967 | Bhakta Prahlada | Telugu | Galira Kumbhini | S. Rajeswara Rao | |
| 1967 | Bhakta Prahlada | Telugu | Hiranyakashipuni Divya Charithamu | S. Rajeswara Rao | Pithapuram Nageswara Rao |
| 1967 | Bhakta Prahlada | Telugu | Patuthara Neethi | S. Rajeswara Rao | |
| 1967 | Bhakta Prahlada | Telugu | Panchabdambulavadu | S. Rajeswara Rao | |
| 1967 | Bhakta Prahlada | Telugu | Munchithi | S. Rajeswara Rao | |
| 1967 | Bhama Vijayam | Telugu | Okkasari Nannuchudu | T. V. Raju | Swarnalatha |
| 1967 | Gruhalakshmi | Telugu | | S. Rajeswara Rao | |
| 1967 | Poola Rangadu | Telugu | Siggenduke Pilla | S. Rajeswara Rao | B. Vasantha |
| 1967 | Nirdoshi | Telugu | Avunanna Kadanna | Ghantasala | L. R. Eswari |
| 1967 | Rahasyam | Telugu | | Ghantasala | |
| 1967 | Sati Sumathi | Telugu | Korukunna Pathi | P. Adinarayana Rao | B. Vasantha |
| 1967 | Sri Krishnavataram | Telugu | | T. V. Raju | |
| 1967 | Stree Janma | Telugu | Vedale Simhabaludu | Ghantasala | Swarnalatha |
| 1967 | Ummadi Kutumbam | Telugu | Sadivinodikanna Oranna | T. V. Raju | L. R. Eswari |
| 1967 | Vasantha Sena | Telugu | Iddariki Eedu Joodu | S. Rajeswara Rao | Swarnalata |
| 1967 | Vasantha Sena | Telugu | Vasantha Sumame | S. Rajeswara Rao | |
| 1968 | Bangaru Gaajulu | Telugu | Aa Aalu Vastegaani | T. Chalapathi Rao | B. Vasantha |
| 1968 | Bhagya Chakramu | Telugu | Manaswamy Naamam | Pendyala Nageswara Rao | Pithapuram Nageswara Rao |
| 1968 | Kalisochina Adrushtam | Telugu | Vandhanaalu | T. V. Raju | Ghantasala & P. Susheela |
| 1968 | Lakshmi Nivasam | Telugu | Bottiro Menaka | K. V. Mahadevan | |
| 1968 | Lakshmi Nivasam | Telugu | College Jeetammu Kattamante Maani | K. V. Mahadevan | |
| 1968 | Nenante Nene | Telugu | Ambavo Shakthivo Ankala Devivo | S. P. Kodandapani | L. R. Eswari |
| 1968 | Niluvu Dopidi | Telugu | Nene Dhanalakshmini | K. V. Mahadevan | Ghantasala, L. R. Eswari & Pithapuram Nageswara Rao |
| 1968 | Niluvu Dopidi | Telugu | Jeevulenubadhinalgu Lakshala | K. V. Mahadevan | |
| 1968 | Ramu | Telugu | Thaaraa Shashaankam | R. Goverdhanam | Pithapuram Nageswara Rao, L. R. Eswari & R. Tilakam |
| 1968 | Simha Swapna | Kannada | Angaile Aagasa Thoro | G. K. Venkatesh | S. Janaki |
| 1968 | Tikka Sankarayya | Telugu | Taaraka Mantramu | T. V. Raju | |
| 1969 | Ekaveera | Telugu | | K. V. Mahadevan | |
| 1969 | Kathanayakudu | Telugu | Ravela Dayaleda Baala Intiki Raaraada | T. V. Raju | Pithapuram Nageswara Rao |
| 1969 | Mooga Nomu | Telugu | | R. Govardhanam | |
| 1969 | Natakala Rayudu | Telugu | Droupadi Pancha Bhartruka | G. K. Venkatesh | |
| 1969 | Varakatnam | Telugu | Illu Vakilirose Illalu | T. V. Raju | |
| 1969 | Varakatnam | Telugu | Sye Sye Jodedla Bandi | T. V. Raju | Ghantasala |
| 1969 | Varakatnam | Telugu | Dharasimhasanamai | T. V. Raju | |
| 1969 | Varakatnam | Telugu | Khagapathi Amrutamuthega | T. V. Raju | |
| 1969 | Varakatnam | Telugu | Yevaru Chesina Karma | T. V. Raju | |
| 1969 | Varakatnam | Telugu | Kattukunna Aali Gayyali Ainacho | T. V. Raju | |
| 1970 | Kodalu Diddina Kapuram | Telugu | Om Sachidaananda Ee Sarvam Govinda | T. V. Raju | Pithapuram Nageswara Rao |
| 1970 | Lakshmi Kataksham | Telugu | | S. P. Kodandapani | |
| 1970 | Sambarala Rambabu | Telugu | Vinnaaraa Vinnaaraa | V. Kumar | P. Leela, K. Swarna, Pithapuram Nageswara Rao, K. Jamuna Rani & J. V. Raghavulu |
| 1971 | Adrusta Jathakudu | Telugu | Appulu Cheyakyra | T. Chalapathi Rao | |
| 1971 | Adrusta Jathakudu | Telugu | Edi Nijamaina | T. Chalapathi Rao | Ghantasala, T. R. Jayadev & Saravathi |
| 1971 | Sampoorna Ramayanam | Telugu | | K. V. Mahadevan | |
| 1972 | Datta Putrudu | Telugu | Choodani | T. Chalapathi Rao | |
| 1972 | Sri Krishna Satya | Telugu | Dharani Garbhami | Pendyala Nageswara Rao | |
| 1972 | Sri Krishna Satya | Telugu | Aaidullichena | Pendyala Nageswara Rao | |
| 1972 | Sri Krishna Satya | Telugu | Samaram Cheyare | Pendyala Nageswara Rao | |
| 1972 | Sri Krishna Satya | Telugu | Radheyudanu | Pendyala Nageswara Rao | |
| 1972 | Sri Krishna Satya | Telugu | Pagaragelichithi | Pendyala Nageswara Rao | |
| 1972 | Sri Krishna Satya | Telugu | Aaduguru | Pendyala Nageswara Rao | |
| 1973 | Aashachakram | Malayalam | Sneham Thannude | B. A. Chidambaranath | |
| 1973 | Andala Ramudu (1973 film) | Telugu | Paluke Bangaramayera | K. V. Mahadevan | M. Balamuralikrishna |
| 1973 | Dabbuki Lokam Dasoham | Telugu | Thaaguthaa Neeyavva | K. V. Mahadevan | |
| 1973 | Dabbuki Lokam Dasoham | Telugu | Dabbuku Lokam Daasoham | K. V. Mahadevan | Pithapuram Nageswara Rao, Mohan Raju & P. Benerjee |
| 1974 | Ammayi Pelli | Telugu | Gudu Gudu Chedugudu | P. Bhanumathi & C. Satyam | Pithapuram Nageswara Rao |
| 1974 | Bangaaru Kalalu | Telugu | Taanagandira | S. Rajeswara Rao | Pithapuram Nageswara Rao |
| 1974 | Tatamma Kala | Telugu | Pandavulu Pandavulu | S. Rajeswara Rao | S. P. Balasubrahmanyam & Kovela Shantha |
| 1975 | Balipeetam | Telugu | Yesukundam Buddoda Yesukundamu | K. Chakravarthy | Pithapuram Nageswara Rao |
| 1975 | Sri Ramanjaneya Yuddham | Telugu | Jayathu Jayathu Srirama | K. V. Mahadevan | B. Vasantha |
| 1975 | Sri Ramanjaneya Yuddham | Telugu | Sri Maha Vishnu Deva | K. V. Mahadevan | |
| 1975 | Samsaram | Telugu | Sakunthala | T. Chalapathi Rao | |
| 1975 | Yashoda Krishna | Telugu | Paaliya Vachina Padathi Pootana | S. Rajeswara Rao | P. Susheela |
| 1976 | Vemulawada Bheemakavi | Telugu | Rajuvedale Sabhaku | Pendyala Nageswara Rao | Tulasi Das |
| 1978 | Sati Savitri | Telugu | | Ghantasala & Pendyala Nageswara Rao | |

=== Actor ===
| Year | Film | Character |
|---|---|---|
| 1946 | Ramadasu | Kabir |
| 1950 | Shavukaru | |
| 1957 | Maya Bazaar | Daaruka |
| 1962 | Dakshayagnam | |

== Madhavapeddi Satyam Award ==
Madhavapeddi Satyam's son, Madhavapeddi Murthy, a Kuchipudi exponent, instituted the Madhavapeddi Awards. Some of the film personalities who have received this award include:

- M.S. Viswanathan
- P. B. Sreenivas
