= List of Telugu films of 1971 =

This is a list of films produced by the Tollywood (Telugu language film industry) based in Hyderabad in the year 1971.

Title	Director	Cast
Adrusta Jathakudu	K. Hemambaradhara Rao	N. T. Rama Rao, Vanisri
Amaayakuraalu	V. Madhusudhana Rao	ANR, Kanchana
Anuradha		Krishna
Bangaru Kutumbam		Krishna
Bangaru Talli		Tapi Chamukya, Jamuna
Bhagyavantudu		
Bhale Papa	K. S. Prakasa Rao	
Bomma Borusa	K. Balachander	Chalam, S. Varalaxmi
Chelleli Kapuram	K. Vishwanath	Shobhan, Vanisri
Chinnanati Snehitulu	K. Vishwanath	NTR, Sobhan Babu, Vanisri
Dasara Bullodu		ANR
Gudachari 003		
Iddaru Ammayilu	S. R. Puttanna Kanagal	ANR, Vanisree, Shobhan Babu
Jeevitha Chakram	C. S. Rao	NTR, Vanisri
Kalyana Mandapam	V. Madhusudan Rao	Shobhan Babu, Kanchana
Manasu Mangalyam	K. Pratyagatma	ANR, Jamuna
Mattilo Manikyam		Chalam Jamuna Bhanumathi
Mosagallaku Mosagadu	K. S. R. Das	Krishna, Vijayanirmala Nagabhushanam
Naa Thammudu		Shobhan Basu, Chandrakala
Nenu Manishine		
Nindu Dampathulu	K. Viswanath	NTR, Savitri, Vijaya Nirmala
Pagabattina Paduchu		Sharada
Pavitra Bandham	V. Madhusudhana Rao	ANR, Kanchana, Vanisri, Krishnam Raju
Pavitra Hrudayalu	A. C. Tirulokchandar	NTR, Jamuna, Chandrakala
Pethamdaarlu		NTR
Prema Nagar	K. S. Prakasa Rao	ANR, Vanisri
Raitu Bidda	B. A. Subba Rao	NTR, Vanisri
Raitu Kutumbam		ANR
Rajakota Rahasyam	B. Vittalacharya	NTR, Devika
Ramalayam	K. Babu Rao	Jaggayya, Shobhan Babu
Rangeli Raja		ANR, Kanchana
Sampoorna Ramayanam		Bapu, Shobhan Babu, Chandrakala
Sati Ansuya		Jamuna
Sri Krishna Satya		NTR Jamuna
Sri Krishna Vijayamu		NTR, Jayalalithaa
Srimanthudu		ANR, Jamuna
Sisindri Chittibabu		
Suputhrudu	T. Rama Rao	ANR, Lakshmi
Tahsildar Gari Ammayi		Shobhan Jamuna
Varalakshmi Vratam	B. Vittalacharya	Kanta Rao, Krishnakumari
Vichithra Kutumbam		NTR Savitri Shobhan Krishna
Vikramarka Vijayam		
Yuddha Bhoomi (1971 Beyond Borders)		Allu Sirish
