= Ravindra Art Pictures =

Indian film production company

- Native name: రవీంద్ర ఆర్ట్ పిక్చర్స్
- Company type: Private
- Industry: Entertainment
- Founded: 1963
- Founder: Tammareddy Krishna Murthy
- Headquarters: Hyderabad, India
- Area served: India
- Products: Films
- Services: Film production

Ravindra Art Pictures is a film production company in Hyderabad, India. It was established by Tammareddy Krishna Murthy. Krishna Murthy started his career in the film industry as a production executive. Later, he started his own production house titled Ravindra Art Pictures and made Lakshadhikari (1963) with N. T. Rama Rao in the lead role as his first production. It was a big success. Other notable films produced by Ravindra Art Pictures include Zamindar (1966), Bangaru Gajulu (1968), Dharma Daata (1970), Doctor Babu (1973).

== History ==
Tammareddy Krishna Murthy initially worked as a tuition teacher for the children of cinema artists in Madras. Then he entered into films as a production executive and worked on films like Palletooru (1952), Rojulu Marayi (1955). Returning to Hyderabad, he worked for many successful films made by Sarathi Studios.

Later, he started his own production house titled Ravindra Art Pictures and made Lakshadhikari (1963) with N. T. Rama Rao in the lead role as his first production. It was a big success. He made Zamindar (1966) with Akkineni Nageswara Rao and many other films like Bangaru Gajulu (1968), Dharma Daata (1970), Sisindri Chitttibabu (1971), Dattaputhrudu (1972), Doctor Babu (1973), Chinnanati Kalalu (1975), Amma Nanna (1976), Love Marriage (1978), and Iddaru Kodukulu (1982).

== Films ==
- Lakshadhikari (1963)
- Zamindar (1966)
- Bangaru Gaajulu (1968)
- Dharma Daata (1970)
- Sisindri Chittibabu (1971)
- Dattaputhrudu (1972)
- Doctor Babu (1973)
- Chinnanati Kalalu (1975)
- Amma Nanna (1976)
- Love Marriage (1978)
- Iddaru Kodukulu (1982)

== Awards ==
- Filmfare Best Film Award (Telugu) - Dharma Daata (1970).
- Nandi Award for Third Best Feature Film - Bronze - Bangaru Gajulu (1968)
