= Koodi Vazhnthal Kodi Nanmai =

Koodi Vazhnthal Kodi Nanmai (transl. Unity is propitious) may refer to:

- Koodi Vazhnthal Kodi Nanmai (1959 film)
- Koodi Vazhnthal Kodi Nanmai (2000 film)
