= Lakshadhikari =

1963 film directed by V. Madhusudhana Rao

- Theatrical release poster
- Directed by: V. Madhusudhana Rao
- Written by: Narla Chiranjeevi
- Produced by: Tammareddy Krishna Murthy; D. Venkatapathi Reddy
- Starring: N. T. Rama Rao; Krishna Kumari
- Cinematography: C. Nageswara Rao
- Edited by: Akkineni Sanjeeva Rao
- Music by: T. Chalapathi Rao
- Production company: Ravindra Art Pictures
- Release date: 27 September 1963
- Running time: 154 minutes
- Country: India
- Language: Telugu

Lakshadhikari (transl. Lakhier) (Note: A lakhier is a person with earnings of at least 1 lakh (100,000) in rupees.) is a 1963 Indian Telugu-language thriller film directed by V. Madhusudhana Rao. The film stars N. T. Rama Rao and Krishna Kumari, with V. Nagayya, Gummadi, Relangi, Ramana Reddy, Mikkilineni, K. V. S. Sarma, Suryakantham, Girija and Rushyendramani in supporting roles. It is the debut production of Tammareddy Krishna Murthy and D. Venkatapathi Reddy's company Ravindra Art Pictures. It was released on 27 September 1963, and became a commercial success.

== Cast ==
- N. T. Rama Rao as Prasad
- Krishna Kumari as Padma
- V. Nagayya as Rangayya
- Gummadi as Seethayya
- Relangi as S. S. Rao
- Ramana Reddy as Pichayya
- Mikkilineni as Panakalu
- K. V. S. Sarma as Sivam
- Suryakantham as Achamma
- Girija as Leela
- Rushyendramani as Lakshmi

== Production ==
=== Development ===
After working as a production controller at Sarathi Studios for years, Tammareddy Krishna Murthy established his own production company Ravindra Art Pictures (named after the poet Rabindranath Tagore) with his friend D. Venkatapathi Reddy as partner. For the company's debut production, which would eventually become Lakshadhikari, Krishna Murthy signed V. Madhusudhana Rao to direct and Narla Chiranjeevi as writer.

The original story was simply a family drama, which did not fully satisfy Krishna Murthy. When Krishna Murthy met producer Parvathaneni Gangadhara Rao, the latter advised him to include an element of suspense in the story, and Krishna Murthy liked the idea. Heeding Krishna Murthy's wishes, Narla Chiranjeevi rewrote the story to make it look more like a thriller. Cinematography was handled by C. Nageswara Rao, and the editing by Akkineni Sanjeeva Rao.

=== Casting and filming ===
N. T. Rama Rao was cast as the male lead Prasad; the fact that he and Krishna Murthy bonded during the making of Palletooru (1952), which was Krishna Murthy's cinematic debut as production manager, helped him get Rama Rao's dates for Lakshadhikari. Krishna Murthy initially chose Nagabhushanam to play the character Seethayya, but later replaced him with Gummadi as he felt he could "conceal villainy behind his soft demeanour and mislead the audience."

One scene filmed at the swimming pool of the College of Engineering, Guindy had Padma (Krishna Kumari) in a swimsuit, but it was edited out by the Censor Board who declared that "the heroine should not wear a swim suit". The exterior portions of Chandamama Buildings in Vadapalani stood in for the college where Padma and Leela (Girija) study. The end of the song "Mabbulo Yemundi" required that Rama Rao and Krishna Kumari walk holding each other's hands on the seashore. As they were walking, a giant wave swept them away. Krishna Kumari did not know swimming and almost drowned, but Rama Rao held her hand tightly and saved her. Peketi Sivaram created the film's revolver sound effects.

== Soundtrack ==
The soundtrack was composed by T. Chalapathi Rao.

No.	Title	Lyrics	Singer(s)	Length
1.	"Achammaku Nithyamu Seemantamayene"	Kosaraju	K. Rani, Swarnalata, Vaidehi	3:15
2.	"Oho Andhamaina Chinnadhana"	Kosaraju	Madhavapeddi Satyam	2:51
3.	"Yelago Yelago Yelago Unnadhi"	Aarudhra	P. Susheela	3:32
4.	"Dachalante Dagadule Dhagudumootalu Sagavule" (female)	C. Narayana Reddy	P. Susheela	3:12
5.	"Mabbulo Yemundi Naa Manasulo Yemundi"	C. Narayana Reddy	Ghantasala, P. Susheela	3:46
6.	"Addhala Meda Undhi Andhala Bhama Undhi"	Kosaraju	Ghantasala, K. Jamuna Rani, Madhavapeddi Satyam	3:55
7.	"Dachalante Dagadule Dhagudumootalu Sagavule" (duet)	C. Narayana Reddy	P. Susheela, Ghantasala

== Release and reception ==
Lakshadhikari was released on 27 September 1963. The film performed well at the box office, and became a trendsetter for more suspense-filled films in Telugu.
