= Tammareddy Krishna Murthy =

Indian film producer (1920–2013)

- Born: 1920; Chinapalaparru, Krishna district (now in Andhra Pradesh, India)
- Died: 16 September 2013 (aged 93)
- Occupation: Film Producer
- Children: Tammareddy Bharadwaja

Tammareddy Krishna Murthy (1920 – 16 September 2013) was an Indian film producer who worked in Telugu cinema. He received the Raghupathi Venkaiah Award from the Government of Andhra Pradesh in 2007.

Krishna Murthy started his career in the film industry as a production executive for films like Palletooru (1952), Rojulu Marayi (1955). Later, he turned a producer and established his own production company named Ravindra Art Pictures. He produced many notable films like Lakshadhikari (1963), Zamindar (1966), Bangaru Gajulu (1968), Dharma Daata (1970), Doctor Babu (1973).

Producer and director Tammareddy Bharadwaja is his son.

== Early life ==
Tammareddy Krishna Murthy was born in Chinapalaparru village, Mudinepalli in Krishna district, Andhra Pradesh. He participated in Indian independence movement in his youth and was jailed. He liked Communist principles and actively participated in the works of Praja Natya Mandali.

== Career ==
Krishna Murthy initially worked as a tuition teacher for the children of cinema artists in Madras. Then he entered into films as a production executive and worked on films like Palletooru (1952), Rojulu Marayi (1955). Returning to Hyderabad, he worked for many successful films made by Sarathi Studios.

Later, he started his own production house titled Ravindra Art Pictures and made Lakshadhikari (1963) with N. T. Rama Rao in the lead role as his first production. It was a big success. He made Zamindar (1966) with Akkineni Nageswara Rao and many other films like Bangaru Gajulu (1968), Dharma Daata (1970), Sisindri Chitttibabu (1971), Dattaputhrudu (1972), Doctor Babu (1973), Chinnanati Kalalu (1975), Amma Nanna (1976), Love Marriage (1978), and Iddaru Kodukulu (1982).

== Personal life ==
Producer and director Tammareddy Bharadwaja, is his son. Tammareddy Lenin Babu, his other son, is also a film director. Krishna Murthy produced many films with Lenin Babu as a director.

== Filmography ==
Production Executive

- Palletooru (1952)
- Rojulu Marayi (1955)

Producer

- Lakshadhikari (1963)
- Zamindar (1966)
- Bangaru Gaajulu (1968)
- Dharma Daata (1970)
- Sisindri Chittibabu (1971)
- Dattaputhrudu (1972)
- Doctor Babu (1973)
- Chinnanati Kalalu (1975)
- Amma Nanna (1976)
- Love Marriage (1978)
- Iddaru Kodukulu (1982)

== Awards ==
- Filmfare Best Film Award (Telugu) – Dharma Daata (1970).
- Nandi Award for Third Best Feature Film – Bronze – Bangaru Gajulu (1968)
- Raghupathi Venkaiah Award – 2007

== See also ==
- Raghupathi Venkaiah Award
