= Navaratri (1966 film) =

- Theatrical release poster
- Directed by: T. Rama Rao
- Written by: Mullapudi Venkata Ramana (dialogues)
- Screenplay by: T. Rama Rao
- Story by: A. P. Nagarajan
- Based on: Navarathri (1964) and nine nights
- Produced by: A. V. Subba Rao
- Starring: Akkineni Nageswara Rao; Savitri
- Narrated by: Jaggayya
- Cinematography: P. S. Selvaraj
- Edited by: J. Krishna Swamy
- Music by: T. Chalapathi Rao
- Production company: Prasad Art Productions
- Release date: April 22, 1966
- Running time: 165 mins
- Country: India
- Language: Telugu

Navaratri (transl. Nine Nights) is a 1966 Telugu-language drama film, produced by A. V. Subba Rao under the Prasad Art Pictures banner and directed by T. Rama Rao. It stars Akkineni Nageswara Rao and Savitri, with music composed by T. Chalapathi Rao. The film is a remake of a Tamil film of the same title (1964), and has Savitri reprising her role. Nageswara Rao got critical acclaim for his portrayal of nine characters. In the song Addala Meda Vundi, Jayalalitha, Kanchana, Jamuna and Girija make guest appearances as patients admitted to a mental hospital, at the request of Savitri, who gave each of them a three-stone diamond ring and a Banarasi sari as a goodwill gesture.

== Plot ==
The plot of the movie is based on what happens during the Hindu festival of Navaratri ("nine nights"). The film opens with the narrator explaining that there are nine types of human behaviors (Navarasam), such as Wonder, Fear, Compassion, Anger, Equanimity, Disgust, Elegance, Bravery and Bliss and that Nageswara Rao's nine roles represents one character per role.

Radha (Savitri) is the only daughter of a rich man. When she happily celebrates Navaratri festival at her home with her friends, her father informs her about the visit of a groom and his parents for her wedding. Radha is reluctant to the proposal as she wants to marry her college mate Venu Gopal. After arguments with her father, she leaves home without her father's knowledge at the first Navaratri night.

First Night (Wonder): She searches for her lover in the college hostel, but finds that he has gone to get married. Radha feels cheated by Venu and attempts suicide, where she is stopped by a widower Anand (Akkineni Nageswara Rao). He takes her to his house and introduces her to his daughter. He urges her to tell her address to drop her safely. Unwilling to return home, she leaves the place the next early morning.

Second Night (Fear): The next day she damages the pot of a vendor by mistake. When vendor fights with her she was rescued by a homely looking woman. The woman takes Radha to her home. Radha meets several women in her house. But the house is actually a brothel. She is trapped by a drunkard (Akkineni Nageswara Rao). The drunkard justifies this, that he cannot seduce his own wife as she is a T.B. patient. Though he does not want to betray his wife, he is not able to resist his feelings. Radha advises and warns him in order to escape from him, but he does not want to hear it. After much struggle, the drunkard falls on the floor and faints. Radha escapes from the place.

Third night (Compassion): After escaping from the brothel, Radha is caught by a patrol policeman for wandering into the road at an unusual time. At the police station she pretends to be a mentally ill woman. The police admit her to a mental hospital. The old aged lonely doctor Karunakar (Akkineni Nageswara Rao) understands that Radha is fine, but is pretending to be ill to escape from the cops and so he helps her. She stays in the hospital the whole night. Meanwhile, Radha's father comes, in search of her, to the Doctor. The Doctor eventually understands the situation and asks one of the nurses to call Radha. But Radha has escaped.

Fourth Night (Anger): Radha misunderstands that the police jeep is coming for her. She dashes with a man with a gun (Akkineni Nageswara Rao) and faints. The man takes her to his place. Radha understands police is not looking for her but looking for the man as he is a killer who killed a rich businessman in revenge for his brother's death. The gunman insists that Radha should leave. But she doesn't as she feels he is a good person and convinces him to surrender to police. In an attack, the gunman is killed by the businessman's henchmen. Radha escapes from the place.

Fifth night (Equanimity): Radha runs into a farmer group cheering and dancing while harvesting the crop. An innocent villager (Akkineni Nageswara Rao), takes her to his house and introduces to his elder sister. A local priest (Relangi) visits their home and says that Radha is possessed by a spirit in order to cheat her of money by performing some fake rituals. Radha gets irritated by their acts and escapes away that night.

Sixth Night (Disgust): Radha meets an old aged leper (Akkineni Nageswara Rao), who once upon a time was a rich man. The man lost all his money in the treatment and charity (hoping that it would help him from the disease). He is disgusted by everyone including his own son who discarded him when his money ran out. Radha helps him by taking him to a hospital. The doctor is surprised as he is one who has benefited with a medicine degree by the charity of the rich man. The doctor decides to stay with him until he is cured. Radha leaves the hospital.

Seventh Night (Elegance): Radha feels very tired and asks for water from one of the houses. People offer water for her. One of the men "Bhagavatha Rao" (Akkineni Nageswara Rao), is a director and actor of stage plays and road side plays. They have been committed for nine stage plays in the village on the account of Navaratri celebration. But the heroine elopes with a harmonium player and his whole troop are in critical position in search of a replacement for the seventh day play failing on which will make them to lose their money and reputation in the village. He asks Radha to help by acting with him for the day's play. Radha agrees on a condition that she should be let gone after the play is over. The play is successful that night. The agent tries to misbehave with Radha and the actor pulls him away and warns him. But he finds that Radha has left.

Eighth Night (Bravery): Radha disguises herself as a man and visits the house of a hunter (Akkineni Nageswara Rao). The hunter has been there for hunting a tiger and for another purpose. Radha introduces herself a secret agent in search of a criminal. The hunter seems to believe her and gives her an earnest welcome, feast and hospitality. Radha finds that the hunter is actually a commissioner of police staying in search of a criminal, which is actually faked by Radha. She tries to escape from the place, but she is caught by the hunter.

The hunter introduces himself as the paternal uncle of the groom whom her father proposed for her and the groom is none other than her lover - Venu Gopal (Akkineni Nageswara Rao). Radha has actually left her home before her father knew that she was in love with a person and the lover is the same man he has arranged for his daughter. Also Radha misunderstands that Venu Gopal actually is going to marry another girl but the girl is actually herself. Radha leaves for Venu Gopal's place the ninth day.

Ninth Day (Bliss): Venu Gopal (Akkineni Nageswara Rao), looks pale and dull after Radha left her home. He is neither interested in living, nor in continuing with his studies. His parents are worried and scold him for wasting his life for a girl after all. Angered by this, he shuts himself into a room. Radha reaches his home that time. Venu's parents and Radha fear that he is attempting suicide. But suddenly the room opens and Radha runs inside.

Venu Gopal actually wanted to surprise Radha about their marriage and that is why he did not inform her about the engagement. Due to miscommunication, Radha left home on the first Navaratri Night and comes back on ninth Navaratri night.

Venu Gopal and Radha happily marry. Except the dead gunman named Gopal Rao of the fourth night, her marriage is attended by the all the seven characters (portrayed by Akkineni Nageswara Rao) she met during those eight days.

== Cast ==
- Akkineni Nageshwara Rao in nine characters as
  - Anand Rao (the widower) (Wonder)
  - Devadasu (the drunkard) (Fear)
  - Karunakar (the doctor) (Compassion)
  - Gopal Rao (the gunman) (Anger)
  - Shantaiyah (the villager) (Equanimity)
  - Siripuram Sundaramaiyah (the leper) (Disgust)
  - Bhagavatha Rao (the actor) (Elegance)
  - Veerabhadra Rao (the hunter/the commissioner of police) (Bravery)
  - Venu Gopala Rao (the bridegroom) (Bliss)
- Savitri as Radha
- Jaggayya as doctor
- V. Nagayya as Lawyer Venkateswam, Venu's father
- Gummadi as Bhimashankaram, Radha's father
- Relangi as Gauraiah
- Ramana Reddy as drama contractor
- Chalam as Raju
- Raja Babu
- Chadalavada
- M. Prabhakar Reddy as police inspector
- Rushyendramani as brothel-house head
- Hemalatha as Venu's mother
- Suryakantam as mental patient
- Chhaya Devi as mental patient
- Girija as mental patient
- Jamuna as mental patient
- Jayalalitha as mental patient
- Kanchana as mental patient
- Geethanjali as mental patient
- Nirmalamma as Lachakka
- Baby Padmini as Ananda Rao's daughter

== Soundtrack ==
Navaratri

Film score by T. Chalapathi Rao
- Released: 1966
- Genre: Soundtrack
- Length: 29:36
- Producer: T. Chalapathi Rao

Music composed by T. Chalapathi Rao. Music released on Audio Company.

S. No.	Song title	Lyrics	Singers	length
1	"Addala Meda Undi"	Kosaraju	P. Susheela, B. Vasantha, B. Manohari	3:46
2	"Cheppana Katha Cheppana"	Dasaradhi	P. Susheela	3:17
3	"Nisha Leni Naadu"	Dasaradhi	Ghantasala	3:38
4	"Navaratri Shubharatri"	Dasaradhi	P. Susheela	4:35
5	"Raju Vedale Sabhaku"	Kosaraju	Ghantasala, Savitri, Ramu, Seetaram, Nalla Ram Murthy	9:48
6	"Yempillo Yekkadiki"	Kosaraju	Ghantasala	4:32
