= Kalavari Kodalu =

- Theatrical release poster
- Directed by: K. Hemambaradhara Rao
- Written by: Narla Chiranjeevi (story / dialogues)
- Produced by: K. Hemambaradhara Rao
- Starring: N. T. Rama Rao; Krishna Kumari
- Cinematography: M. G. Singh
- Edited by: B. Gopala Rao
- Music by: T. Chalapathi Rao
- Production company: Raghuram Pictures
- Release date: 14 March 1964
- Running time: 132 minutes
- Country: India
- Language: Telugu

Kalavari Kodalu (transl. Daughter-in-law of a Wealthy Family) is a 1964 Indian Telugu-language drama film, produced and directed by K. Hemambaradhara Rao under the Raghuram Pictures banner. It stars N. T. Rama Rao and Krishna Kumari, with music composed by T. Chalapathi Rao.

== Cast ==
- N. T. Rama Rao as Dr. Anand
- Krishna Kumari as Latha
- Ramana Reddy as Sivanandam
- Padmanabham as Bheema Rao
- Chalam as Anji
- Prabhakar Reddy as Shankar
- Suryakantham as Gangamma
- Geetanjali as Hamsa
- Girija as Rani
- Hemalatha as Rajyalakshmi

== Soundtrack ==
Kalavari Kodalu

Film score by T. Chalapathi Rao
- Released: 1964
- Genre: Soundtrack
- Length: 24:50
- Producer: T. Chalapathi Rao

Music composed by T. Chalapathi Rao. Music released by Audio Company.

S. No.	Song title	Lyrics	Singers	length
1	"Manchi Manasu"	Narla Chiranjeevi	S. Janaki	3:52
2	"Yanduke Yanduke"	C. Narayana Reddy	P. Susheela; Saraswathi	3:09
3	"Donga Choopulu"	Aarudhra	Ghantasala; Jikki	4:53
4	"Bhalega Navvithivi"	C. Narayana Reddy	Ghantasala	3:17
5	"Emito Ee Vipareetam"	Kosaraju	Ghantasala	3:37
6	"Virisina Poovunu"	C. Narayana Reddy	P. Susheela	2:56
7	"Nee Sogase"	Kosaraju	Madhavapeddi Satyam; Pithapuram	3:06
