= Penki Pellam =

1956 Indian film by Kamalakara Kameswara Rao

- Theatrical release poster
- Directed by: Kamalakara Kameswara Rao
- Written by: Aarudhra (dialogues)
- Produced by: D. B. Narayana; S. Bhavanarayana
- Starring: N. T. Rama Rao; Rajasulochana; Sriranjani Jr.
- Cinematography: Annayya
- Edited by: V. S. Narayana; R. V. Rajan
- Music by: K. Prasada Rao
- Production company: Sahini Art Productions
- Release date: 6 December 1956
- Running time: 160 minutes
- Country: India
- Language: Telugu

Penki Pellam (transl. stubborn wife) is a 1956 Telugu-language drama film, produced by D. B. Narayana and S. Bhavanarayana under the Sahini Art Productions banner and directed by Kamalakara Kameswara Rao. It stars N. T. Rama Rao, Rajasulochana, Sriranjani Jr. with music composed by K. Prasada Rao.

== Cast ==
- N. T. Rama Rao as Raju
- Rajasulochana as Saroja
- Sriranjani Jr. as Seeta
- Relangi as Raobahadoor Govinda Rao
- Ramana Reddy as Sarabhaiah
- Nagabhushanam as Rangaiah
- Peketi Sivaram as A. V. Rao
- K.V.S.Sarma as Papaiah
- Amarnath as Vasu
- A.V.Subba Rao Jr. as Inspector
- Suryakantham as Sundaramma
- Chaya Devi as Tayaru
- E. V. Saroja as Dancer
- Hemalatha as Rattamma
- Seeta

== Soundtrack ==
Penki Pellam

Film score by K. Prasada Rao
- Released: 1956
- Genre: Soundtrack
- Length: 33:45
- Producer: K. Prasada Rao

Music composed by K. Prasada Rao. Music released by Audio Company.

S. No.	Song title	Lyrics	Singers	length
1	"Bharamu Needenamma"	Aarudhra	P. Leela	3:11
2	"Amma Amma"	Aarudhra	P. Susheela	3:38
3	"Ledoyee Ledoyee Vere Haayi"	Aarudhra	P. B. Srinivas, P. Susheela	3:05
4	"Aadadante Alusaa"	Aarudhra	Jikki	3:19
5	"Chal Chal Gurram"	V. V. L. Prabhakar	Sarojini	2:03
6	"Aatalu Sagunate"	Aarudhra	A. P. Komala	2:31
7	"Ledusuma"	Aarudhra	Ghantasala	3:16
8	"Sogasarivadu Shokainavadu"	Aarudhra	Jikki	3:14
9	"Nannu Pendladavoi"	Aarudhra	A. M. Rajah, Jikki	3:15
10	"Chencheetanayya"	Aarudhra	A. M. Rajah, Jikki	3:09
11	"Paduchdanam Railu Bandi"	Aarudhra	Jikki	3:04
