= Mangalasutram (film) =

1966 film

- Theatrical release poster
- Directed by: A. K. Velan
- Written by: Pinishetty (dialogues)
- Produced by: A. K. Velan
- Starring: N. T. Rama Rao; Devika
- Cinematography: Satyam
- Edited by: V. N. Raghupathi
- Music by: T. Chalapathi Rao
- Production company: Arunachalam Studios
- Release date: 19 May 1966
- Country: India
- Language: Telugu

Mangalasutram (transl. Wedding Chain) is a 1966 Indian Telugu-language drama film, produced and directed by A. K. Velan under the Arunachalam Studios banner. It stars N. T. Rama Rao and Devika, with music composed by T. Chalapathi Rao.

== Cast ==
- N. T. Rama Rao as Raju
- Devika as Shanta
- Ramana Reddy as Joga Rao
- Padmanabham as Shankar
- Ramana Murthy
- Perumallu
- Geetanjali as Bala
- Vasanthi as Kamala
- Hemalatha as Parvathi
- Nirmalamma

== Soundtrack ==
Music composed by T. Chalapathi Rao.

Song title	Lyrics	Singers
"Okkamata"	Kosaraju	P. Susheela
"Andala Chinadanini"	Dasaradhi	P. B. Srinivas, S. Janaki
"Chusara Evaraina Chusara"	Kosaraju	Jayadev, Vasantha
"Naa Manasu Navvanela"	Dasaradhi	Jikki
"Bhale Bhale Posukolu Bavaiah"	Kosaraju	P. B. Srinivas, S. Janaki
"Edi Chikati Jeevitham"	Sri Sri	P. B. Srinivas
