= Hemalatha (Telugu actress) =

Indian Telugu actress (1926–2019)

- Born: Hemalatha Devi; 1926; Gudivada, Krishna, Andhra Pradesh, India
- Died: 2019 (aged 92–93); Hyderabad
- Other name: P. Hemalatha
- Occupation: Actress
- Years active: 1952–1976
- Spouse: Seshagiri Rao

Hemalatha (1926 – 2019) was an Indian actress of Telugu cinema, of Andhra Pradesh. She acted in more than 100 films during the 1950s to 1976. The first movie she acted was Palletooru. She retired from movies in 1976, with Seethamma Santhanam being the film she last appeared. After retiring from movies, she was involved in Brahma Kumaris movement in Hyderabad till her death.

== Selected filmography ==
=== Actress ===
- 1976 Seethamma Santanam
- 1976 Mahakavi Kshetrayya
- 1976 Sita Kalyanam
- 1976 Secretary
- 1976 Vemulawada Bheemakavi
- 1975 Balipeetam
- 1975 Eduruleni Manishi
- 1975 Kathanayakuni Katha
- 1975 Sri Ramanjaneya Yuddham
- 1973 Vaade Veedu
- 1972 Bharya Biddalu
- 1972 Sri Krishnanjaneya Yuddham
- 1971 Prema Nagar
- 1971 Atthalu Kodallu as Annapurnamma
- 1971 Sampoorna Ramayanam
- 1971 Jeevitha Chakram
- 1970 Marina Manishi
- 1970 Mayani Mamata
- 1970 Pettandarulu
- 1970 Ali Baba 40 Dongalu
- 1970 Lakshmi Kataksham
- 1970 Balaraju Katha
- 1969 Karpura Harathi as Shantha
- 1969 Mathru Devata
- 1969 Kadaladu Vadaladu
- 1969 Aadarsa Kutumbam
- 1969 Gandikota Rahasyam
- 1969 Sri Rama Katha as Kausalya
- 1968 Deva kanya
- 1968 Bangaru Gaajulu
- 1968 Manchi Kutumbam
- 1968 Nindu Samsaram
- 1968 Niluvu Dopidi
- 1968 Tikka Sankaraiah
- 1967 Sri Krishnavataram
- 1967 Gopaludu Bhoopaludu
- 1967 Ummadi Kutumbam
- 1966 Mangalasutram
- 1966 Palnati Yuddham
- 1966 Navarathri
- 1966 Aatma Gowravam
- 1965 Zamindar
- 1965 C. I. D.
- 1965 Visala Hrudayalu
- 1965 Manchi Kutumbam
- 1965 Devatha
- 1965 Manushulu Mamathalu
- 1965 Enga Veetu Pillai Tamil movie
- 1964 Pooja Phalam
- 1964 Aathma Balam
- 1964 Kalavari Kodalu
- 1964 Vivaha Bandham
- 1964 Ramudu Bheemudu
- 1964 Vaarasatwam
- 1964 Manchi Manishi
- 1964 Sri Tirupatamma Katha
- 1963 Savati Koduku
- 1963 Chaduvukunna Ammayilu
- 1963 Eedu Jodu
- 1963 Punarjanma
- 1963 Thobuttuvulu
- 1962 Padandi Munduku
- 1962 Gundamma Katha
- 1962 Tiger Ramudu
- 1962 Gulebakavali Katha
- 1961 Bharya Bharthalu
- 1961 Kalasivunte Kaladu Sukham
- 1961 Pendli Pilupu
- 1961 Velugu Needalu
- 1960 Nammina Bantu
- 1960 Devanthakudu
- 1960 Santhi Nivasam
- 1959 Pelli Sandadi
- 1959 Illarikam
- 1959 Banda Ramudu
- 1959 Bala Nagamma
- 1958 Raja Nandini
- 1958 Atha Okinti Kodale
- 1958 Ettuku Pai Ettu
- 1958 Shobha
- 1958 Bhookailasa
- 1958 Bhookailas
- 1957 Bhale Ammayilu
- 1957 Bhagya Rekha
- 1956 Sonta Ooru
- 1956 Penki Pellam
- 1956 Charana Daasi
- 1956 Edi Nijam
- 1956 Bhale Ramudu
- 1955 Donga Ramudu
- 1955 Kanyasulkam
- 1955 Santhanam
- 1955 Rojulu Marayi
- 1954 Bangaru Papa
- 1954 Anta Manavalle
- 1954 Vaddante Dabbu
- 1954 Peddamanushulu
- 1954 Todu Dongalu
- 1954 Sangham
- 1953 Chandirani
- 1952 Palletooru – Debut
