= Raitu Kutumbam =

- Theatrical release poster
- Directed by: T. Rama Rao
- Written by: Gollapudi Maruti Rao (dialogues)
- Screenplay by: T. Rama Rao
- Story by: P. V. Subba Rao
- Produced by: P. V. Subba Rao; P. S. Prakash Rao
- Starring: Akkineni Nageswara Rao; Kanchana
- Cinematography: P. S. Selvaraj
- Edited by: J. Krishna Swamy; Balu
- Music by: T. Chalapathi Rao
- Production company: Nava Bharath Movies
- Release date: 1972
- Running time: 152 minutes
- Country: India
- Language: Telugu

Raitu Kutumbam (transl. Farmer's Family) is a 1972 Indian Telugu-language drama film directed by T. Rama Rao. It stars Akkineni Nageswara Rao and Kanchana, with music composed by T. Chalapathi Rao.

== Cast ==
- Akkineni Nageswara Rao as Ramu
- Kanchana as Radha
- Ramakrishna as Madhu
- Krishnam Raju as Sudhakar (Guest)
- V. Nagayya as Ramu's father
- Satyanarayana as Joogaiah
- Dhulipala as Panakaalu
- Padmanabham as Lokeswara Rao / Lokam
- Sakshi Ranga Rao as Sambhaiah
- G.V.Subba Rao as Venu Gopal Rao
- Anjali Devi as Annapurna
- Suryakantham as Bhulokamma
- Geetanjali as Geetha
- Vijaya Lalitha as Dancer
- Anitha as Lakshmi
- Master Aadinarayana Rao as Young Ramu
- Master Yerramilli Srinivas as Young Madhu

== Soundtrack ==
Music composed by T. Chalapathi Rao.

Song title	Lyrics	Singers	length
"Ee Mattilone Puttamu"	C. Narayana Reddy	Ghantasala	5:18
"Ammaa Challani Maa"	Dasaradhi	Ghantasala, Jayadev, Sharavathi	3:42
"Manase Pongenu Ee Vela"	Dasaradhi	Ghantasala, P. Susheela	3:26
"Oorantha Anukuntunnaru"	C. Narayana Reddy	Ghantasala, P. Susheela	3:42
"Jillayile Jillaayile"	C. Narayana Reddy	Ghantasala, L. R. Eswari	4:27
"Yekkadikani Pothunaavu"	C. Narayana Reddy	Ghantasala	4:28
"Vaddanna Vadaladule"	Kosaraju	L. R. Eswari	3:28
