= Sabhash Raja =

- Theatrical release poster
- Directed by: P. S. Ramakrishna Rao
- Written by: Samudrala Jr. (dialogues)
- Screenplay by: P. S. Ramakrishna Rao
- Produced by: Sundarlal Nahata; Doondy
- Starring: Akkineni Nageswara Rao; Rajasulochana
- Cinematography: Kamal Ghosh
- Edited by: C. Hari Rao; N. S. Prakasam
- Music by: Ghantasala
- Production company: Rajasri Productions
- Release date: 9 November 1961
- Running time: 197 minutes
- Country: India
- Language: Telugu

Sabhash Raja (transl. Bravo Raja) is a 1961 Indian Telugu-language drama film, produced by Sundarlal Nahatha, Doondy under the Rajasri Productions banner and directed by P. S. Ramakrishna Rao. It stars Akkineni Nageswara Rao and Rajasulochana, with music composed by Ghantasala.

== Plot ==
The film begins with a millionaire, Raghu, who leads a happy life with his wife, Sarala, & a son. Raghu has a younger brother, Raja, who fled from the house in childhood by admitting Raghu's misdeeds. He is currently a pick-pocket with an acolyte, Miriyalu, and falls for a street dancer, Rani. Once Raghu visits the branch office, his malicious Manager, Madhu, entangles him with Manorama and habituates all sorts of vices. From there, he neglects his family and quits them. At that point, Raja snatches Raghu's pocket, and he notices their childhood photo with Raghu's marriage photo and comprehends the fact. Anyhow, Raghu refuses to accept him to evade the share. Eventually, Raja encounters and recognizes Sarala, who shelters them being unbeknownst. Madhu lusts for Rani, viewing her dance, bribes her father, Tata, and fabricates Raja & Sarala's relationship. Tata mortifies them when Raja divulges the truth and decides to reform his brother. Hence, he joins Sarala as a maid in Raghu's home. Parallelly, Rani loathes Raja, learning his profession when he surrenders as a penance. Before leaving, he entrusts Sarala's responsibility to Miriyalu & Rani. Meanwhile, Madhu & Manorama swindle Raghu, whom Miriyalu & Rani bar. Hereupon, Madhu locks Rani in Raghu's room. However, Miriyalu apprehends them by the Police. Besides, Tata acquits Raja on bail, who rushes to Raghu when he seeks to kill him while molesting Rani as an alcoholic, but Sarala hinders him. At last, regretful Raghu pleads pardon. Finally, the movie ends on a happy note with the marriage of Raja & Rani.

== Cast ==
- Akkineni Nageswara Rao as Raja
- Rajasulochana as Rani
- Kanta Rao as Raghu
- Devika as Sarala
- Relangi as Miriyalu
- Nagabhushanam as Madhu
- Girija as Manorama
- Meena Kumari as Jamuna

== Soundtrack ==
Sabhash Raja

Film score by Ghantasala
- Released: 1961
- Genre: Soundtrack
- Length: 34:43
- Producer: Ghantasala

Music composed by Ghantasala.

S. No	Song title	Lyrics	Singers	length
1	"Idigo Idigo"	Samudrala Jr.	Ghantasala, P. Susheela	3:40
2	"Andala Ranivai"	Arudra	Ghantasala, P. Leela	3:49
3	"Mana Anandamaina"	Samudrala Jr.	P. Susheela	3:05
4	"O Vannela Vayyari"	Samudrala Jr.	K. Jamuna Rani	3:26
5	"O Shokaina Teekaina"	Kosaraju	Ghantasala, P. Susheela	3:57
6	"Mana Anandamaina" (Sad)	Samudrala Jr.	P. Susheela	1:08
7	"Adurika Ledae"	Kosaraju	Madhavapeddi Satyam, S. Janaki	2:24
8	"Age Vela"	Samudrala Jr.	Ghantasala	2:06
9	"Lokana Dongalu"	Kosaraju	P. Susheela	4:13
10	"Vinodam Korevu"	Arudra	P. Susheela	3:24
11	"Aagevela Yenatikaina"	Samudrala Jr.	Ghantasala	3:31
