= Geetanjali (actress) =

Indian actress (1947–2019)

Geethanjali
- Born: Mani; 1947; Kakinada, Madras Presidency, British India
- Died: 31 October 2019 (aged 71–72); Hyderabad, Telangana, India
- Occupation: Actress
- Years active: 1960–2019
- Spouse: Ramakrishna
- Children: 1
- Parents: Sri Rama Murthy (father); Shyamalamba (mother)

Geetanjali (1947 – 31 October 2019), also spelled Geethanjali, was an Indian actress who worked in Telugu, Tamil, Malayalam, and Hindi films. In a career spanning close to six decades, she featured in over 500 films across multiple languages. Her first film as a dancer is Rani Ratnaprabha in 1960. N. T. Rama Rao introduced her to the silver screen as a heroine with his directorial debut film Sita Rama Kalyanam in 1961. She gained fame for her roles in Murali Krishna (1964), Doctor Chakravarthy (1964), Illalu (1965), Sambarala Rambabu (1970), Kaalam Marindi (1972), and Abbayigaru Ammayigaru (1973). She was also a member of the Nandi Awards committee.

== Personal life ==
Geethanjali worked in the Hindi film Parasmani (1963), a Lakshmikant-Pyarelal production. Since her name Mani was already present in the title, the film-maker re-christened her as Geetanjali.

Geethanjali worked with actor Rama Krishna in number of films like Thodu Needa (1965), Hantakulostunnaru Jagratta (1966), Rajayogam (1967), Ranabheri (1968), Nenu Naa Desam (1973) etc. before marrying him on 15 August 1974.

== Death ==
Geethanjali died in the early hours of 31 October 2019 from cardiac arrest. She died while undergoing treatment at a private hospital near Film Nagar in Hyderabad.

== Filmography ==
=== Telugu ===
1. Rani Ratnaprabha (1960) - debut as a Bharatanatyam dancer
2. Seetarama Kalyanam (1961) as Goddess Sita
3. Gulebakavali Katha (1962)
4. Kalavari Kodallu (1964) as Hamsa
5. Dr. Chakravarthy (1964) as Sudha
6. Thotalo Pilla Kotalo Rani (1964) as Dancer
7. Murali Krishna (1964) as Poornima
8. Bobbili Yuddham (1964)
9. Babruvahana (1964) as Rukmini
10. Desa Drohulu (1964)
11. Manchi Manishi (1964)
12. Sabhash Suri (1964)
13. Sri Satyanarayana Mahathyam (1964)
14. Aada Brathuku (1965)
15. Veerabhimanyu (1965)
16. Illalu (1965) Heroine and double role
17. Devata (1965) as Hema
18. Thodu Needa (1965) - First movie with future husband, Ramakrishna (Telugu actor)
19. Leta Manasulu (1966) as Nirmala
20. Potti Pleader (1966) paired with Padmanabham
21. Gudachari 116 (1966)
22. Hantakulostunnaru Jagratta (1966)
23. Navaratri (1966)
24. Mangalasutram (1966)
25. Loguttu Perumaalakeruka (1966)
26. Sakunthala (1966)
27. Sri Krishna Pandaveeyam (1966)
28. Aada Paduchu (1967)
29. Poola Rangadu (1967)
30. Bhakta Prahlada (1967)
31. Chadarangam (1967)
32. Upayamlo Apayam (1967)
33. Stree Janma (1967)
34. Sri Krishnavataram (1967)
35. Pattukunte Padivelu (1967) as Lakshmi
36. Adrushtavanthulu (1967)
37. Ave Kallu (1967) as Julie
38. Sri Sri Sri Maryada Ramanna (1967)
39. Prana Mitrulu (1967)
40. Nirdoshi (1967)
41. Rahasyam (1967)
42. Ranabheri (1968) as Devasena
43. Adrushtavanthalu (1968) as Radha
44. Bhagya Chakramu (1968)
45. Bangaru Gaajulu (1968)
46. Baghdad Gaja Donga (1968)
47. Panthalu Pattimpulu (1968)
48. Kalisochina Adrushtam (1968)
49. Thalli Prema (1968)
50. Pelliroju (1968)
51. Nene Monaganni (1968)
52. Manchi Kutumbam (1968)
53. Raja Yogam (1968)
54. Ramu (1968)
55. Sati Arundhati (1968)
56. Sri Rama Katha (1969) as Rati
57. Manchi Mitrulu (1969)
58. Nindu Hrudayalu (1969)
59. Aadarsa Kutumbam (1969)
60. Raja Simha (1969) as Vasavi
61. Bhale Abbayilu (1969) as Radha
62. Adrushtavanthulu (1969)
63. Karpura Harathi (1969) as Pankajam
64. Nirdoshi (1970)
65. Kathanayika Molla (1970)
66. Dharma Daata (1970)
67. Chitti Chellelu (1970)
68. Sambarala Rambabu (1970)
69. Mattilo Manikyam (1971) as Subbulu
70. Jatakaratna Midathambotlu (1971)
71. Manasu Mangalyam (1971)
72. Pavitra Bandham (1971)
73. Kalam Marindi (1972)
74. Raitu Kutumbam (1972)
75. Adrushta Devatha (1972)
76. Manchi Rojulu Vachayi (1972) as Radha
77. Abbaigaru Ammaigaru (1973) - paired with Telugu Super Star Krishna
78. Ajanma Brahmachari (1973)
79. Devudamma (1973) as Paidithalli
80. Nenu Naa Desam (1973)
81. Srivaru Maavaru (1973) as Padma
82. Kannavari Kalalu (1974)
83. Premalu Pellillu (1974)
84. Jeevithame Oka Cinema (1993)
85. Pacha Thoranam (1994)
86. Fools (2003)
87. Maayajaalam (2006)
88. Pellaina Kothalo (2006) as Hari's Grandmother
89. Neramu Siksha (2009)
90. Parama Veera Chakra (2011)
91. Mogudu (2011) as Grandmother
92. Greeku Veerudu (2013)
93. Bhai (2013) as Vasu's Grandmother
94. Vunnadhi Okate Zindagi (2017)
95. Sree Ramudinta Sree Krishnudanta (2017)

=== Tamil ===
1. Sarada (1962)
2. Deivathin Deivam (1962)
3. Thaayin Madiyil (1964)
4. Maayamani (1964)
5. Alli (1964)
6. Panam Padaithavan (1965)
7. Vaazhkai Padagu (1965)
8. Veera Abhimanyu (1965)
9. Aasai Mugam (1965) as Kamala
10. Adhey Kangal (1967)
11. Nenjirukkum Varai (1967)
12. Anbalippu (1969)
13. En Annan (1970)
14. Annamitta Kai (1972)
15. Ganga Gowri (1973)

=== Hindi ===
1. Paying Guest (1957) as Shanthi's sister
2. Parasmani (1963) as Rajkumari
3. Do Kaliyaan (1968) as Menaka
4. Balram Shri Krishna (1968) as Rukmini
5. Tulsi Vivah (1971)
6. Bandhu (1992)

=== Malayalam ===
1. Kaattumallika (1966)
2. Swapnangal (1970) as Rajamma
3. Madhuvidhu (1970) as Sathi
