= Zamindar (1966 film) =

- Theatrical release poster
- Directed by: V. Madhusudhana Rao
- Screenplay by: V. Madhusudhana Rao
- Story by: Mullapudi Venkata Ramana
- Produced by: Tammareddy Krishna Murthy
- Starring: Akkineni Nageswara Rao; Krishna Kumari
- Cinematography: P. S. Selvaraj
- Edited by: Akkineni Sanjeeva Rao
- Music by: T. Chalapathi Rao
- Production company: Ravindra Art Pictures
- Release date: 7 January 1966
- Running time: 174 minutes
- Country: India
- Language: Telugu

Zamindar (transl. Landlord) is a 1966 Indian Telugu-language action thriller film directed by V. Madhusudhana Rao. It stars Akkineni Nageswara Rao, Krishna Kumari and music composed by T. Chalapathi Rao. It was produced by Tammareddy Krishna Murthy under the Ravindra Art Pictures banner. The film is loosely based on the 1963 English film Charade.

== Plot ==
Raju learns that Seshu is not a Zamindar and hires his henchmen to stage an act which makes Subba Rao reveal Seshu as his brother. Enraged at the betrayal and assuming Subba Rao to be involved in Seshu's act, Narahari slaps him. Seshu enrages and threatens to kill him. Exploiting it, Raju kills Narahari. He uses the same henchmen to stage another act and lead Seshu to Narahari's house and implicate Seshu in the murder. Immediately, Seshu chases after them. Subba Rao sees Seshu leaving through the window and misjudging the context, Subba Rao self-incriminates to shield Seshu. Saroja also sees Seshu running, and thinks he is the murderer.

Joginder's briefcase is found but they do not find the money. Here, Raju changes the backstory and pretends to be good before Narahari's family by lying that he is a CID officer who arrived to solve the case and locate the stolen fortune. Seshu constantly monitors & surveillance their movements. The three men continue to torment Narahari's family. One night, Seshu comes to Saroja's house in search of Narahari's diaries to find the loot, but Saroja objects and demands that he leave. On his way out, he tangles with Murthy and fends him off. When Kumar violently approaches Saroja, Seshu breaks in and threatens him, after which he leaves. Seshu then fights Johnny and incapacitates him. Saroja walks into the bathroom to find Kumar lying dead in the tub.

Raju and Saroja find Narahari's diaries and find out where the loot must be kept. Raju goes to the location, meanwhile Johnny overhears Saroja mention the location. Johnny arrives at the spot, where Raju tricks him and kills him. At that time, Joginder appears and states that he exchanged the money for diamonds and hoarded them in the pocket watch. Murthy tries to run for the loot but is killed by Joginder. Joginder finds Hanumanthu with a pocket watch and takes it. Seshu combats Joginder and kills him, taking the watch, only to realize that is a new watch that Hanumanthu bought after selling the old one at a watch shop. Saroja and Hanumanthu arrive at the watch shop and secure the old watch with the diamonds. Saroja runs with the watch and Seshu pursues her. In the middle of the forest, Raju confronts Seshu and demands the watch be given to him or else he will kill both of them. Raju reveals himself as the killer of Narahari and mastermind criminal behind everything, shocking Saroja. He holds Saroja captive while Seshu surrenders. But Seshu comes from behind, and in a final battle, kills Raju and secures the watch.

Finally, the movie ends happily with the marriage of Seshu & Saroja.

== Cast ==
- Akkineni Nageswara Rao as Seshagiri Rao "Seshu"
- Krishna Kumari as Saroja
- Gummadi as Subbarao
- Nagabhushanam as Raja Rao "Raju"
- Relangi as Hanumanthu
- Mudigonda Lingamurthy as Narahari
- Mikkilineni as Joginder
- Satyanarayana as Johnny
- Nellore Kanta Rao as Murthy
- Ch. Krishnamurthy as Raju's Assistant
- Suryakantham as Madam
- Hemalatha as Lakshmi
- L. Vijayalakshmi as Secretary Viji

== Soundtrack ==
Music composed by T. Chalapathi Rao.

S. No.	Song title	Singers	Lyrics	length
1	"Ammayi Garu"	Ghantasala, P. Susheela, Vasantha, Jayadev, Ramola	Dasaradhi	6:22
2	"Palakarinchitene"	Ghantasala, P. Susheela	C. Narayana Reddy	4:37
3	"Kastoori Ranga Ranga"	Ghantasala	Kosaraju	2:23
4	"Aa Navvula Kosame"	Ghantasala, P. Susheela	C. Narayana Reddy	4:09
5	"Chukkalu Podiche Vela"	Ghantasala, P. Susheela	Arudra	4:21
6	"Nene Nene Letha"	S. Janaki	Arudra	4:11
7	"Neethone Vuntanu"	P. Susheela	C. Narayana Reddy	3:12
