= Samsaram (1975 film) =

- Theatrical release poster
- Directed by: T. Prakash Rao
- Written by: Bhamidipati Radhakrishna (dialogues)
- Screenplay by: T. Prakash Rao
- Story by: Tatineni Annapurna
- Produced by: T. Prakash Rao
- Starring: N. T. Rama Rao; Jamuna
- Cinematography: S. Venkataratnam
- Edited by: N. M. Shankar
- Music by: T. Chalapathi Rao
- Production company: Anil Productions
- Release date: 28 May 1975
- Running time: 164 mins.
- Country: India
- Language: Telugu

Samsaram (transl. Family) is a 1975 Indian Telugu-language drama film, produced and directed by T. Prakash Rao under the Anil Productions banner. It stars N. T. Rama Rao and Jamuna. The music was composed by T. Chalapathi Rao.

== Plot ==
The story follows a married couple, Raghava Rao and Lalitha, and their two children, Shekar and Lakshmi. Because the couple married without the approval of Lalitha’s father, a lawyer named Pratap Rao, he treats them with hostility. Meanwhile, Raghava exposes a scam run by Satyam, the general manager and brother-in-law of his company's owner, Bhupati. In response, Bhupati replaces Satyam with Raghava, which makes Satyam resentful. As Raghava enters high society, he begins drinking, which causes conflicts within his family.

== Cast ==
- N. T. Rama Rao as Raghava Rao
- Jamuna as Lalitha
- Jaggayya as Bhupathi
- Satyanarayana as Satyam
- Prabhakar Reddy as Dara
- Mikkilineni as Lawyer Pratap Rao
- Padmanabham
- Allu Ramalingaiah as Lingam
- Mada
- Raavi Kondala Rao as Raja Rao
- P. J. Sarma
- Chitti Babu as Gopi
- K. K. Sarma
- Jayasudha as Saroja
- Rojaramani as Lakshmi
- Jaya Malini as item number
- Pushpa Kumari
- Vijaya Bhanu as Nalini
- Jhansi

== Soundtrack ==
Samsaram

Film score by T. Chalapathi Rao
- Released: 1975
- Genre: Soundtrack
- Length: 35:11
- Label: Polydor Records
- Producer: T. Chalapathi Rao

Music composed by T. Chalapathi Rao. Music released by Polydor Records Company.

S. No	Song title	Lyrics	Singers	length
1	"Maa Paapa Puttina Roju"	Dasaradhi	S. P. Balasubrahmanyam, P. Susheela	3:12
2	"Leraa Bujji Maavaa"	Kosaraju	L.R.Eswari	4:25
3	"Theeya Theeyani"	Dasaradhi	V. Ramakrishna	3:39
4	"Chiru Chiru Navvula"	Kosaraju	S. P. Balasubrahmanyam, Saraswati	7:30
5	"Sakunthala"	Dasaradhi	Madhavapeddi Satyam	5:18
6	"Ontarigaa Unnaamu"	C. Narayana Reddy	Madhavapeddi Ramesh, S. Janaki	4:16
7	"Yavvanam Puvvulaantidhi"	Dasaradhi	S. P. Balasubrahmanyam, L. R. Eswari	4:28
8	"Singapooru Rowdy"	Kosaraju	S. P. Balasubrahmanyam	2:23
