= Tiger Ramudu =

Film directed by C. S. Rao

- Theatrical release poster
- Directed by: C. S. Rao
- Written by: Samudrala Jr (dialogues)
- Produced by: Patnam Chinna Rao; Vaddi Sriramulu
- Starring: N. T. Rama Rao; Rajasulochana
- Cinematography: A. Shanmukham; Jagirdar
- Edited by: T. R. Srinivasulu
- Music by: Ghantasala
- Production company: Sri Srinivasa Productions
- Release date: 8 March 1962
- Running time: 133 minutes
- Country: India
- Language: Telugu

Tiger Ramudu is a 1962 Indian Telugu-language action drama film, produced by Patnam Chinna Rao and Vaddi Sriramulu and directed by C. S. Rao. It stars N. T. Rama Rao, Rajasulochana with music composed by Ghantasala.

== Cast ==
- N. T. Rama Rao as Ramu
- Rajasulochana as Radha
- S. V. Ranga Rao as Prabhakar
- Relangi as Rama Brahmam
- C.S.R as Chandraiah
- Girija as Julie
- Hemalatha as Rajyam
- Sandhya as Lalitha
- Master Nagaraju as Young Ramu

== Soundtrack ==
Tiger Ramudu

Film score by Ghantasala
- Released: 1962
- Genre: Soundtrack
- Length: 42:45
- Producer: Ghantasala

Music composed by Ghantasala. Lyrics were written by Samudrala Jr.

S. No.	Song title	Singers	length
1	"Sreemannabheeshta"	Ghantasala	0:44
2	"Parithranaya"	Ghantasala	0:25
3	"Mohini Bhasmasura"	Madhavapeddi Satyam, Vaidehi	5:07
4	"Danpathulu"	Raghavulu	0:33
5	"Chanduruni"	Ghantasala	0:33
6	"O Vayyari"	Ghantasala, Jikki	3:23
7	"Nava Bhavanalu"	S. Janaki	3:35
8	"Varudhuni Pravarakyudu"	Ghantasala, S. Janaki	3:33
9	"Ulakaka Palakaka"	Ghantasala, S. Janaki	2:49
10	"Hayi Hayi Hayi"	Ghantasala, K. Jamuna Rani	3:58
11	"Enni Dinaalaku Vintiniraa"	P. Leela	3:03
12	"Chandamama Lokamlo"	Ghantasala, K. Jamuna Rani	3:32
13	"Aasa Duraasa"	Ghantasala	6:22
14	"Talli Biddala Veru Chese"	Ghantasala	3:37
15	"Aasa Duraasa"-2	Ghantasala	1:31
