= Dharma Daata =

- Theatrical release poster
- Directed by: A. Sanjeevi
- Written by: Pinisetty (dialogues)
- Screenplay by: Tammareddy Krishnamurthy; Yaddanapudi Sulochana Rani
- Story by: Balamurugan
- Based on: Enga Oor Raja (1968)
- Produced by: Tammareddy Krishnamurthy
- Starring: Akkineni Nageswara Rao; Kanchana
- Cinematography: S. Venkataratnam
- Edited by: Balu
- Music by: T. Chalapathi Rao
- Production company: Ravindra Art Pictures
- Release date: 7 May 1970
- Running time: 189 minutes
- Country: India
- Language: Telugu

Dharma Daata is a 1970 Indian Telugu-language drama film, produced by Tammareddy Krishna Murthy under the Ravindra Art Pictures banner and directed by A. Sanjeevi. It stars Akkineni Nageswara Rao and Kanchana, with music composed by T. Chalapathi Rao. It is a remake of the Tamil film Enga Oor Raja (1968), and was a box office success.

== Cast ==
- Akkineni Nageswara Rao as Raja Raghupathi Rao & Sekhar (Dual role)
- Kanchana as Padma
- Nagabhushanam as Zamindar Bhujanga Rao
- Relangi as Bhushanam
- Padmanabham as Chakravarthy
- Allu Ramalingaiah as Yedukondalu
- Sakshi Ranga Rao as Bhaja Govindam
- Vallam Narasimha Rao as Satyam
- Venkateswara Rao as Seth Dayaram
- Eeswara Rao as Prasad
- Sowcar Janaki as Suseela
- Suryakantham as Vijayapur Rani
- Geetanjali as Vijayapur Yuvarani
- Anita as Jaya
- Jhansi as Lakshmi
- Master Aadinarayana Rao as Young Sekhar
- Master Visweswara Rao as Young Chakravarthy

== Music ==
Dharma Daata

Film score by T. Chalapathi Rao
- Released: 1970
- Genre: Soundtrack
- Length: 34:08
- Producer: T. Chalapathi Rao

Music was composed by T. Chalapathi Rao. Music released on Audio Company.

S. No	Song title	Lyrics	Singers	length
1	"Hello Engineer"	C. Narayana Reddy	Ghantasala	4:41
2	"Chinnari Bullemma"	C. Narayana Reddy	Ghantasala, P. Susheela	3:48
3	"Om Parameswari"	C. Narayana Reddy	Ghantasala, P. Susheela	4:24
4	"Evarivo Neevevarivo"	C. Narayana Reddy	Jayadev, P. Susheela	3:43
5	"Jo Laali Jo Laali"	C. Narayana Reddy	Ghantasala	3:59
6	"Yevvadi Kosam Yevadunnaadu"	Kosaraju	Ghantasala	4:06
7	"O Nanna Nee Manase Venna"	C. Narayana Reddy	Ghantasala, Jayadev, P. Susheela	5:01
8	"O Dharma Daata"	C. Narayana Reddy	Ghantasala	4:26

== Box office ==
The film ran for 100 days in 13 centres and the celebrations were held at Shanti Talkies, Hyderabad.

== Awards ==
- Filmfare Best Film Award (Telugu) – Tammareddy Krishnamurthy (1970).
