= Doctor Babu =

- Directed by: Tammareddy Lenin Babu
- Story by: Vrajendra Sinha
- Produced by: Tammareddy Krishna Murthy
- Starring: Sobhan Babu; Jayalalitha
- Cinematography: M. Kannappa
- Edited by: Akkineni Sanjeeva Rao; Balu
- Music by: T. Chalapathi Rao
- Production company: Ravindra Art Pictures
- Release date: 9 November 1973
- Country: India
- Language: Telugu

Doctor Babu is a Telugu language film released in 1973. It starred Sobhan Babu and Jayalalitha in lead roles. This romantic social drama film was a remake of the Hindi film Himalay Ki Godmein.

== Cast ==
- Sobhan Babu as Sekhar
- Jayalalitha as Gauri
- Rajanala as Pothuraju
- Gummadi as Narayana Rao
- S.V. Ranga Rao as Mallu Dora
- Raja Babu as Chikkadu
- Allu Ramalingaiah as Devayya
- Mukkamala as Dharmanna
- Relangi as Jagannatha Rao
- G. Varalakshmi as Parvathi
- Vijayalalitha as Leela
- K.K. Sarma as Thimmaraju
- Chalapathi Rao
- Gokina Rama Rao as Sambhulu
- Nagesh (special appearance in a song)

== Soundtrack ==
No.	Title	Singer(s)	Length
1.	"Naa Raatha"	L. R. Eswari	3:07
2.	"Gaajulaite Todigaadu"	P. Susheela	3:41
3.	"Nee Vanukunnadhi"	P. Susheela, Ghantasala	4:47
4.	"Evadura Donga"	M. Satyam & B. Vasantha
