= Mahatmudu =

- Theatrical release poster
- Directed by: M. S. Gopinath
- Written by: Acharya Aatreya (dialogues)
- Screenplay by: M. S. Gopinath
- Story by: M. S. Gopinath
- Produced by: M. S. Gopinath
- Starring: Akkineni Nageswara Rao; Sharada
- Cinematography: P. S. Selvaraj
- Edited by: I. V. Shanmugam
- Music by: T. Chalapathi Rao
- Production company: Rajeswari Chitra
- Release date: 1976
- Running time: 134 mins
- Country: India
- Language: Telugu

Mahatmudu (transl. Great Soul) is a 1976 Telugu-language drama film, produced and directed by M. S. Gopinath under the Rajeswari Chitra banner. It stars Akkineni Nageswara Rao and Sharada, with music composed by T. Chalapathi Rao.

== Cast ==
- Akkineni Nageswara Rao as Venu Gopal
- Sharada as Seeta
- Satyanarayana as Nanda Gopal
- Murali Mohan as Prasad
- Kanta Rao as Ranganatham
- Allu Ramalingaiah as Basavaiah
- Mukkamala as Doctor
- Thyagaraju as Bandipootu Pattakatti Papaiah
- Giri Babu as Giri
- K.K.Sarma as Bhajarangam
- G. Varalakshmi as Parvathamma
- Roja Ramani as Padma
- Prabha as Radha
- Jaya Malini as item number
- Jhansi

== Crew ==
- Art: G. V. Subba Rao
- Choreography: Chinni-Sampath, Taara
- Dialogues: Acharya Aatreya
- Lyrics: C. Narayana Reddy, Kosaraju
- Playback: V. Ramakrishna, P. Susheela, Madhavapeddi Ramesh, Wilson, L.R.Anjali
- Music: T. Chalapathi Rao
- Editing: I. V. Shanmugam
- Cinematography: P. S. Selvaraj
- Story - Screenplay - Producer - Director: M. S. Gopinath
- Banner: Rajeswari Chitra
- Release Date: 1977

== Soundtrack ==
Mahatmudu

Film score by T. Chalapathi Rao
- Released: 1976
- Genre: Soundtrack
- Length: 30:50
- Producer: T. Chalapathi Rao

Music composed by T. Chalapathi Rao. Music released on Audio Company.

S. No.	Song title	Lyrics	Singers	length
1	"Paadanaa Ne Paadanaa"	Kosaraju	P. Susheela	4:15
2	"Entha Madhuram"	C. Narayana Reddy	P. Susheela	4:45
3	"Chitti Paapaa"	Kosaraju	V. Ramakrishna, P. Susheela	3:55
4	"Enthagaa Choosthunnaa"	C. Narayana Reddy	V. Ramakrishna, P. Susheela	5:08
5	"Edhurugaa Neevunte"	C. Narayana Reddy	V. Ramakrishna, P. Susheela	4:53
6	"Rambhalaagaa"	Kosaraju	Madhavapeddi Ramesh, Wilson, L.R.Anjali	4:32
7	"Manishi Manishiga"	C. Narayana Reddy	V. Ramakrishna	3:22
