= Nirdoshi (1967 film) =

- Theatrical release poster
- Directed by: V. Dada Mirasi
- Written by: D. V. Narasa Raju (dialogues)
- Screenplay by: V. Dada Mirasi
- Story by: V. Dada Mirasi
- Produced by: N. Ramabrahmam
- Starring: N. T. Rama Rao; Savitri
- Cinematography: Jagirdar
- Edited by: B. Kandaswamy
- Music by: Ghantasala
- Production company: Sri Gowthami Pictures
- Release date: 2 February 1967
- Running time: 136 mins
- Country: India
- Language: Telugu

Nirdoshi (transl. Innocent) is a 1967 Indian Telugu-language crime drama film, produced by N. Ramabrahmam under the Sri Gowthami Pictures banner and directed by V. Dada Mirasi. It stars N. T. Rama Rao and Savitri, with music composed by Ghantasala.

== Cast ==
- N. T. Rama Rao as Ananda Rao and Sundaram
- Savitri as Kamala
- Anjali Devi as Lakshmi
- Satyanarayana as Gangadharam
- Padmanabham as Sambu
- Allu Ramalingaiah
- Geetanjali as Manjula
- Mikkilineni as Ramesam
- Mukkamala as Naganna
- Raavi Kondala Rao as Doctor
- Malladi as Dharmanna
- Ch. Krishna Murthy as Ramu
- Jagga Rao as Police Inspector

== Soundtrack ==
Music composed by Ghantasala.

S. No.	Song title	Lyrics	Singers	Length
1	"Suku Suku Sitaru Bomma"	C. Narayana Reddy	L. R. Eswari	3:06
2	"Singari Chekumukku"	C. Narayana Reddy	P. Susheela	2:58
3	"Malliyalara Mallikalara"	C. Narayana Reddy	Ghantasala	3:36
4	"Ee Pata Nee Kosame"	C. Narayana Reddy	Ghantasala, P. Susheela	3:09
5	"Chinari Krishnayya"	C. Narayana Reddy	P. Susheela	3:15
6	"Avunanna Kadanna"	Kosaraju	Madhavapeddi Satyam, L. R. Eswari	3:24
