= T. Chalapathi Rao =

Background information
- Born: Tatineni Chalapathi Rao; 22 December 1920; Vuyyuru, Krishna, Madras Presidency, British India
- Died: 22 February 1994 (aged 73) Madras, Tamil Nadu, India
- Occupations: Composer, music director
- Years active: 1953-1984

Tatineni Chalapathi Rao (22 December 1920 – 22 February 1994) was an Indian music composer who worked in Telugu cinema. His career spanned more than three decades from the early 1950s, till 1980s. He was a cousin of filmmaker T. Prakash Rao.

== Early life ==
Born to Dronavilli Manikyamma and Rattayya in the village of Vuyyuru in the Krishna district of Andhra Pradesh on 22 December 1920, but he was adopted by Tatineni Koteswara Rao and his wife Kotamma. He was the cousin of T. Prakash Rao.

== Career ==
His first film as music director was the Telugu film Puttillu in 1953 jointly with another music director, Mohan Das. His first independent work was for the Tamil film Amara Deepam (1956). Thereafter until 1984 he scored music for around 125 films mostly in Telugu and some in Tamil.

He created many popular songs for films starring Akkineni Nageswara Rao. Through the 1950s, 1960s and 1970s, Chalapathi Rao and Nageswara Rao gave innumerable hits. Notable among them are Illarikam (1959), Punarjanma (1963), Manushulu Mamatalu (1965), Navaratri (1966), Dharma Daata (1970) and Srimanthudu (1971); together with some real chartbusters in 1972 which include Datta Putrudu, Manchi Rojulu Vachhayi and Raithu Kutumbam. To the end the pair continued to create music for films including Kanna Koduku (1973), Palletoori Baava (1973), Aalu Magalu (1977) and Sri Rama Raksha (1978).

T. Chalapathi Rao's hit scores with other Telugu heroes including Manchi Rojulu Vachchayi, Amma Nanna, Manchi Manasu and Kamalamma Kamatam with Krishnam Raju, Lakshadhikari, Ramuni Minchina Ramudu, Kalavaari Kodalu with N. T. Rama Rao and films such as Goodhachari 116, Asadhyudu with Krishna.

The last film he scored music for was Janam Manam in 1984.

== Personal life ==
He was married to Annapurna with whom he did not have children and later married Dr Jamuna with whom he had two sons and a daughter.

== Filmography ==
Year	Film	Language	Director	Banner	Notes
1953	Puttilu	Telugu	Dr. Raja Rao	Raja Productions	with C. Mohandas
1954	Parivartana	Telugu	T. Prakash Rao	Janata Pictures	with C. Mohandas
1956	Amara Deepam	Tamil	T. Prakash Rao	Venus Pictures	G. Ramanathan & G. N. Balasubramaniam
1956	Amara Jeevi	Telugu	T. Prakash Rao	Venus Pictures	G. Ramanathan
1958	Pathi Bakthi	Telugu	A. Bhimsingh	Buddha Pictures	
1958	Veera Pratap	Telugu	T. Prakash Rao	Venus Pictures	G. Ramanathan
1959	Illarikam	Telugu	T. Prakash Rao	Prasad Art Pictures	
1959	Koodi Vazhnthal Kodi Nanmai	Tamil	D. S. Rajagopal	Narasu Studios	
1959	Uthami Petra Rathinam	Tamil	M. A. Thirumugam	Amara Productions	
1960	Maa Babu	Telugu	T. Prakash Rao	Pragathi Art Productions	
1960	Meenda Sorgam	Tamil	C. V. Sridhar	Madhuram Pictures	
1961	Anbu Magan	Tamil	T. Prakash Rao	Pragathi Art Productions	
1961	Punar Jenmam	Tamil	R. S. Mani	Vijaya Films	
1961	Thandrulu Kodukulu	Telugu	K. Hemabharadara Rao	Raghuramayya Creations	
1962	Sri Valli Kalyanam	Telugu	T. R. Ramanna	Narasu Studios	
1963	Lakshadhikari	Telugu	V. Madhusudhana Rao	Ravindra Art Pictures	
1963	Punarjanma	Telugu	K. Pratyagatma	Prasad Art Pictures	
1963	Chandra Kumara	Kannada	N. S. Varma	H M Baba Productions	M. Venkataraju is the co-music director.
1964	Kalavari Kodalu	Telugu	K. Hemambaradhara Rao	Raghuram Pictures	
1964	Manchi Manishi	Telugu	K. Pratyagatma	Chaya Chitra	
1964	Mane Aliya	Kannada	S. K. A. Chari	Prasad Art Pictures	
1964	Nalvaravu	Tamil	Charlie–Maniam	S. V. Movies	
1965	Manushulu Mamathalu	Telugu	K. Pratyagatma	Navayuga Films	
1965	Mavana Magalu	Kannada	S. K. A. Chari	Prasad Art Pictures	
1966	Badukuva Daari	Kannada	K. S. Prakash Rao	Balaram Pictures	
1966	Gudachari 116	Telugu	M. Mallikarjuna Rao	Vauhini Studios	
1966	Mangalasutram	Telugu	A. K. Velan	Arunachalam Studios	
1966	Navaratri	Telugu	T. Rama Rao	Prasad Art Pictures	
1966	Zamindar	Telugu	V. Madhusudhana Rao	Ravindra Art Pictures	
1967	Aada Paduchu	Telugu	K. Hemambharadhara Rao	Subhashini Art Pictures	
1967	Maadi Veettu Mappilai	Tamil	S. K. A. Chari	Prasad Art Pictures	
1967	Marapurani Katha	Telugu	V. Ramachandra Rao	Sri Productions	
1967	Pattukunte Padivelu	Telugu	M. Mallikarjuna Rao	Navajyoti Films	
1967	Shiva Leelalu	Telugu	A. P. Nagarajan	Sri Vijayalakshmi Pictures	with K. V. Mahadevan
1968	Asadhyudu	Telugu	V. Ramachandra Rao	Tiger Productions	
1968	Bangaru Gaajulu	Telugu	C. S. Rao	Ravindra Art Pictures	
1968	Brahmachari	Telugu	T. Rama Rao	Prasad Art Pictures	
1968	Chelleli Kosam	Telugu	M. Mallikarjuna Rao	Jayasri Lakshmi Pictures	
1968	Nadamanthrapu Siri	Telugu	T. Rama Rao	Navajyoti Pictures	
1968	Prema Katha	Telugu	Muktha Srinivasan	Muktha Films	
1968	Srimanthulu	Telugu	T. R. Ramanna	R. R. Pictures	
1969	Chiranjeevi	Telugu	Savitri	Arunachalam Studios	
1969	Madhura Milana	Kannada			
1969	Madras To Hyderabad	Telugu	Thirumalai–Mahalingam	Sri Venkateswara Cinetone	
1969	Prema Kanuka	Telugu	V. Sobhanadri Rao	Digvijaya Films	
1970	Akhandudu	Telugu	V. Ramachandra Rao	Tiger Productions	
1970	Dharma Daata	Telugu	A. Sanjeevi	Ravindra Art Pictures	
1971	Adrusta Jathakudu	Telugu	K. Hemambaradhara Rao	Subhashini Art Pictures	
1971	Pavitra Hrudayalu	Telugu	A. C. Tirulokchandar	Sri Vijaya Venkateswara Films	
1971	Sisindri Chittibabu	Telugu	Akkineni Sanjeevi Rao	Ravindra Art Pictures	
1971	Srimanthudu	Telugu	K. Pratyagatma	Viswa Bharathi Productions	
1972	Datta Putrudu	Telugu	Tammareddy Lenin Babu	Ravindra Art Pictures	
1972	Kiladi Bullodu	Telugu	Nandamuri Ramesh	Chitrakaka Films	
1972	Manchi Rojulu Vachchayi	Telugu	V. Madhusudhana Rao	Gemini Studios	
1972	Raitu Kutumbam	Telugu	T. Rama Rao	Nava Bharath Movie	
1973	Doctor Babu	Telugu	Tammareddy Lenin Babu	Ravindra Art Pictures	
1973	Kanna Koduku	Telugu	V. Madhusudhana Rao	Vishwa Bharti Production	
1973	Mainaru Babu	Telugu	T. Prakash Rao	Saradhi and TPR Combines	
1973	Palletoori Bava	Telugu	K. Pratyagatma	Prasad Art Pictures	
1974	Adapillala Tandri	Telugu	K. Vasu	Satya Enterprises	
1974	Gali Patalu	Telugu	T. Prakash Rao	Anil Arts	
1974	Mugguru Ammayilu	Telugu	K. Pratyagatma	Navabharat Art Films	
1974	Vani Dongala Rani	Telugu	Aamancharla Seshagiri Rao	Navodaya Art Movies	
1975	Chinninati Kalalu	Telugu	K. Viswanath	Ravindra Art Pictures	
1975	Devudu Chesina Pelli	Telugu	T. Rama Rao	Sri Lakshmi Productions	
1975	Parivartana	Telugu	K. Hemambaradhara Rao		
1975	Ramuni Minchina Ramudu	Telugu	M. S. Gopinath	Rajeswari Fine Arts	
1975	Samsaram	Telugu	T. Prakash Rao	Anil Productions	
1975	Vayasochina Pilla	Telugu	Lakshmi Deepak	Krishiwala Pictures	
1976	Alludochchaadu	Telugu	K. Pratyagatma	Prasad Art Pictures	
1976	Amma Nanna	Telugu	Tammareddy Lenin Babu	Ravindra Art Pictures	
1976	Mahatmudu	Telugu	M. S. Gopinath	Rajeswari Chitra	
1976	Vanaja Girija	Telugu	Gautham	Sri Vanaja Movies	
1977	Aalu Magalu	Telugu	T. Rama Rao	Prasad Art Pictures	
1977	Ardhangi	Telugu	A. Mohan Gandhi	Prasad Art Pictures	
1977	Athavarillu	Telugu	K. Pratyagatma	Prasad Art Pictures	
1977	Gadusu Ammayi	Telugu	K. Pratyagatma	Dwarka Art Productions	
1977	Mahanubhavudu	Telugu	K. Hemambharadhara Rao	Subhasini Combines	
1977	Mohini Vijayamu	Telugu	N. S. Varma	Sri Venkatalakshmi Pictures	with M. Poornachandra Rao
1978	Manchi Manasu	Telugu	K. Pratyagatma	A. A. Combines	
1978	Sri Rama Raksha	Telugu	T. Rama Rao	Ajay Art Pictures	
1978	Thalle Challani Daivam	Telugu	M. S. Gopinath	Rajeshwari Chitra Combines	
1979	Kamalamma Kamatam	Telugu	K. Pratyagatma	Prasad Art Pictures	
1979	Love Marriage	Telugu	Tammareddy Lenin Babu	Ravindra Art Pictures	
1980	Janthu Prapancham	Telugu		Sri Lakshminarayana Films	
1980	Nayakudu Vinayakudu	Telugu	K. Pratyagatma	Prasad Art Pictures	
1980	Thandava Krishna Tarangam	Telugu	Rajkumar		with Sanjay Manikya
1980	Yuvatharam Kadilindi	Telugu	Dhavala Satyam	Navataram Pictures	
1981	Harischandrudu	Telugu	U. Visweswar Rao	Vishwashanthi Movies	
1981	Maro Kurukshetram	Telugu	Tammareddy Lenin Babu	Charita Film Combines	
1982	Circus Prapancham	Telugu	U. Visweswar Rao		
1983	Keerthy Kantha Kanakam	Telugu	U. Visweswar Rao	Vishwashanthi Movies	
1984	Janam Manam	Telugu	Mohan Das	Navaratnam Films	
1985	Thayi Thande	Kannada	V. Sathyanarayana	U S R Pictures	
