= Kalimi Lemulu =

- Theatrical release poster
- Directed by: Gutta Ramineedu
- Written by: Tripuraneni Gopichand (dialogues)
- Screenplay by: Gutha Ramineedu
- Story by: G. D. Madgulkar
- Produced by: P. Gangadhar Rao
- Starring: Akkineni Nageswara Rao; Krishna Kumari
- Cinematography: M. K. Raju
- Edited by: M. S. Mani
- Music by: Aswattama
- Production company: Nava Sakthi Films
- Distributed by: Vani Films
- Release date: 21 June 1962
- Country: India
- Language: Telugu

Kalimi Lemulu (transl. Wealth and Poverty) is a 1962 Telugu-language drama film directed by Gutta Ramineedu. It stars Akkineni Nageswara Rao and Krishna Kumari, with music composed by Aswattama. It was produced by P. Gangadhar Rao.

== Plot ==
The film begins in a village where Ramaiah, a potter, resides with his wife Manikyamba, & sibling Raju, who adores his elder & sister-in-law as parentage and falls for his maternal uncle Subbaiah's daughter Vimala. A cordial relationship flourishes between the two families, and they engage the twosome. Following this, Raju walks to the town for higher education. Meanwhile, Subbaiah plans for a factory and debts from stingy loan shark Shavukar Narsaiah, which Ramaiah guarantees. Soon, he earns well when Narsaiah also allies. During that quandary, Raju returns and establishes a cottage industry at his brother's aid. Narsaiah occupies it, too, instead of his dues, which leads to Ramaiah's death. After a while, Subbaiah moved with the bridal connection of Raju & Vimala, stipulating that the bridegroom must be matrilocality. Though Manikyamba agrees, Raju denies it. Besides, Narsaiah appoints his son Raja Shekaram as their factory manager, who maltreats the laborers, and they quit being fed-up workers. Ergo, Raju starts up a new industry by accumulating them. Now Subbaiah declares Vimala's knit with Raja Shekaram. Parallelly, Narsaiah ploys to destroy Raju's factory. Overhearing it, Vimala rushes to Manikyamba, and they all approach the factory. At last, Raju shields it, ceases the baddies, and Subbaiah reforms. Finally, the movie ends happily with the marriage of Raju & Vimala.

== Cast ==
- Akkineni Nageswara Rao as Raju
- Krishna Kumari as Vimala
- Gummadi as Ramayya
- C.S.R as Subbayya
- Dhulipala as Narasayya
- Mikkilineni
- Ramana Reddy as Devayya
- Prabhakar Reddy as Raja Sekharam
- Padmanabham
- Balakrishna
- G. Varalakshmi as Manikyamba
- Surabhi Balasaraswathi

== Music ==
Kalimi Lemulu

Film score by Aswadhama
- Released: 1962
- Recorded: 21:38
- Genre: Soundtrack
- Producer: Aswattama

Music was composed by Aswattama. Lyrics were written by Malladi Ramakrishna Sastry. Music was released on Audio Company.

S. No.	Song title	Singers	length
1	"Ayyare Chuda Chakkani"	Jikki	3:24
2	"Chilipi Chilukamma"	Ghantasala, P. Susheela	3:18
3	"Galilo Tele Poolalo"	Ghantasala, P. Susheela	3:14
4	"Kommala Meeda"	P. Susheela	3:19
5	"Nosata Vrasina"	P. Susheela	2:55
6	"Kalaloni Galimeda"	P. Susheela	2:54
7	"Cheyyaku Dubara"	Madhavapeddi Satyam, Vasantha	2:34
