= Srimanthudu (1971 film) =

- Theatrical release poster
- Directed by: K. Pratyagatma
- Written by: Mullapudi Venkata Ramana
- Screenplay by: K. Pratyagatma
- Produced by: G. Radhakrishna Murthy; A. Ramachandra Rao
- Starring: Akkineni Nageswara Rao; Jamuna
- Cinematography: K. S. Ramakrishna Rao
- Edited by: P. Srihari Rao
- Music by: T. Chalapathi Rao
- Production company: Viswa Bharathi Productions
- Release date: 16 July 1971
- Running time: 151 mins
- Country: India
- Language: Telugu

Srimanthudu (transl. Millionaire) is a 1971 Indian Telugu-language drama film produced by G. Radhakrishna Murthy and A. Ramachandra Rao under the Viswa Bharathi Productions banner and directed by K. Pratyagatma. It stars Akkineni Nageswara Rao and Jamuna, with music composed by T. Chalapathi Rao. Kamal Haasan worked under Thangappan as his dance assistant in this film.

== Cast ==
- Akkineni Nageswara Rao as Raja
- Jamuna as Radha
- Gummadi as Sekharam
- Ramana Reddy as Hanumanthu
- Raja Babu as Babji
- Raavi Kondala Rao as Kishtappa
- Sakshi Ranga Rao as Guruji
- J. L. Narasimha Rao as Chalapathi
- Suryakantham as Kaasulamma
- Jhansi as Lakshmi
- Master Aadinarayana as Young Raja
- Baby Sridevi as Young Radha

== Soundtrack ==
Kanna Koduku

Film score by T. Chalapathi Rao
- Released: 1971
- Genre: Soundtrack
- Length: 29:13
- Producer: T. Chalapathi Rao

Music composed by T. Chalapathi Rao.

S. No.	Song title	Lyrics	Singers	length
1	"Modati Peggulo"	C. Narayana Reddy	Ghantasala	3:36
2	"Buli Buli Yerrani"	Dasaradhi	Ghantasala	3:46
3	"Challani Vennelalo"	Aarudhra	P. Susheela	2:59
4	"Entho Chinnadi Jeevitham"	Kosaraju	Ghantasala	3:13
5	"Chitti Potti Bommalu"	Dasaradhi	Jikki, P. Susheela	3:45
6	"Harilo Ranga Hari"	Kosaraju	L. R. Eswari, Jayadev	4:26
7	"Aha Emandamu"	Dasaradhi	Ghantasala	3:03
8	"Konte Choopulu"	C. Narayana Reddy	P. Susheela	4:35
