= Koodi Vazhnthal Kodi Nanmai (1959 film) =

1959 film by D. S. Rajagopal

- Theatrical release poster
- Directed by: D. S. Rajagopal
- Screenplay by: Thuraiyur Murthi
- Produced by: V. L. Narasu
- Starring: S. S. Rajendran; B. Saroja Devi; Prem Nazir; Girija
- Cinematography: V. Kumaradevan
- Music by: T. Chalapathi Rao
- Production company: Narasu Studios
- Distributed by: Chamba Talkie Distributors
- Release date: 14 February 1959
- Running time: 187 minutes
- Country: India
- Language: Tamil

Koodi Vazhnthal Kodi Nanmai (transl. Unity is propitious) is a 1959 Indian Tamil-language film produced by V. L. Narasu and directed by D. S. Rajagopal. The film stars S. S. Rajendran and B. Saroja Devi.

== Plot ==
The film's story is woven with problems faced by people from different linguistic and other backgrounds. The hero is a Tamil-speaking person. When he comes to Madras for employment, he finds it difficult to find accommodation. A Malayalam speaking person refuses to rent out a room for him. The hero meets the heroine while hailing for a taxi and they fall in love. The story is complicated but all ends well educating the audience that unity is propitious for all.

== Cast ==
The list is compiled from the database of Film News Anandan and from the review article in the Hindu newspaper.

- S. S. Rajendran
- B. Saroja Devi
- Prem Nazir
- Girija
- V. K. Ramasamy
- S. V. Subbaiah
- D. Balasubramaniam
- Sayeeram
- C. K. Saraswathi
- Ganapathi Bhat
- Ratnam
- Lakshmi

== Production ==
The film was produced by V. L. Narasu under his own banner Narasu Studios and was filmed at his studio that bore the same name. However, the film was released after his death and therefore it was dedicated to his memory. D. S. Rajagopal directed the film while Thuraiyur Murthi wrote the screenplay and dialogues. Cinematography was by V. Kumaradevan. Art Director was Vasanth Biankar. K. N. Dandayudhapani Pillai and Jayaraman was in charge of Choreography. Kannappan handled the still photography.

== Soundtrack ==
Music was composed by T. Chalapathi Rao while the lyrics were penned by Thanjai N. Ramaiah Dass.

Song	Singer/s	Duration
"Jaya Jaya Jaya Bharathi"	Group song	
"Naattu Valappam Ariyaa"	T. M. Soundararjan	
"En Ullathaye Kollai Konda"	T. M. Soundararjan	03:37
"Mana Oonjalile Aadum Mannaa"	T. M. Soundararjan	
"Padhumai Thaano, Paayum Pulli"	P. B. Srinivas	02:45
"Mathaa Pithaavin Manam Kulira"	P. B. Srinivas	
"Onnu Venumaa Ille"	S. Janaki	03:35
"Machaan Unnaithaane"	S. Janaki	

== Release and reception ==
Koodi Vazhnthal Kodi Nanmai was released on 14 February 1959, delayed from a Diwali 1958 release. According to film historian Randor Guy, it was an average success "mainly because of the predictable storyline and treatment".
