= Pavitra Hrudayalu =

- Theatrical release poster
- Directed by: A. C. Tirulokchandar
- Screenplay by: A. C. Tirulokchandar
- Story by: Pinisetti
- Produced by: C. S. Raju
- Starring: N. T. Rama Rao; Jamuna; Chandrakala
- Cinematography: K. S. Prasad
- Edited by: Kandaswamy
- Music by: T. Chalapathi Rao
- Production company: Sri Vijaya Venkateswara Films
- Release date: 24 November 1971
- Running time: 167 minutes
- Country: India
- Language: Telugu

Pavitra Hrudayalu (transl. Divine Hearts) is a 1971 Indian Telugu-language drama film directed by A. C. Tirulokchandar. It stars N. T. Rama Rao, Jamuna, and Chandrakala, and features music composed by T. Chalapathi Rao. The film is produced by C. S. Raju under the Sri Vijaya Venkateswara Films banner.

== Cast ==
- N. T. Rama Rao as Ravindra Babu
- Jamuna as Suseela
- Chandrakala as Vijaya
- Gummadi as Nagendra Babu
- V. Nagayya as Zamindar Bhujanga Rao
- Santha Kumari as Annapurnamma
- Satyanarayana as Seshagiri
- Dhulipala as Sivayya
- Mikkilineni as Police Officer
- Rajanala
- Allu Ramalingaiah as Paanakaalu
- Raja Babu as Bobby
- Sandhya Rani as Rani
- Thyagaraju as Subbigadu
- Perumaalu as Ramayya
- K. V. Chalam
- Padma Khanna

== Music ==
Music was composed by T. Chalapathi Rao. Lyrics were written by C. Narayana Reddy.

Song title	Singers	Length
"Sarananna Vaarini"	S. Janaki	4:40
"Naa Madhi Paadina"	Ghantasala	4:06
"Chirunavvula"	Ghantasala, S. Janaki	5:32
"Manase Manashiki"	T. Chalapathi Rao	3:05
"Chukkala Cheera"	Ghantasala	4:28
"Palikedhi"	M. Balamuralikrishna, Nookala Chinna Satyanarayana	5:47
