= Adrusta Jathakudu =

- Theatrical release poster
- Directed by: K. Hemambaradhara Rao
- Written by: Maddipatla Suri; Adurthi Narasimha Murthy (dialogues)
- Story by: Balamurugan
- Produced by: K. Hemambaradhara Rao
- Starring: N. T. Rama Rao; Vanisri
- Cinematography: Sekhar-Singh
- Edited by: B. Gopala Rao
- Music by: T. Chalapathi Rao
- Production company: Subhashini Art Pictures
- Release date: 6 August 1971
- Running time: 137 mins
- Country: India
- Language: Telugu

Adrusta Jathakudu (transl. Man with the Lucky Horoscope) is a 1971 Telugu-language drama film produced and directed by K. Hemambaradhara Rao under the Subhashini Art Pictures banner. It stars N. T. Rama Rao and Vanisri, with music composed by T. Chalapathi Rao.

== Plot ==
An honest schoolteacher named Anantaramaiyah lives in a village with his two young children, Prasad and Sarada. A greedy local landlord (Zamindar Raja Raghunath Rao) tries to capture the school's land, but the teacher refuses to give it up.

In revenge, the landlord sets fire to the school. The teacher dies while saving his kids. Now orphans, the brother and sister are separated.

== Cast ==
- N. T. Rama Rao as Prasad
- Vanisri as Vijaya
- Nagabhushanam as Raja Raghunatha Rao
- Mikkilineni as Subbaramaiah
- Dhulipala as Parandhamaiah
- Ramakrishna as Gopal
- Padmanabham as Brahmam
- Allu Ramalingaiah as Ananda Rao
- Raavi Kondala Rao as Captain Eeswar Rao
- Sakshi Ranga Rao as Govinda Rao
- Potti Prasad as Papaiah
- Chidatala Appa Rao as Venkata Swamy
- Jagga Rao as Tadigala Tatabbai
- Radha Kumari as Ramanamma
- Suma as Sharada
- Lakshmi Kantamma
- Jyothi Lakshmi as item number
- Master Adinarayana as Young Prasad
- Baby Sridevi as Young Sharada
- Chalapathi Rao as Doctor

== Soundtrack ==
Adrusta Jathakudu

Film score by T. Chalapathi Rao
- Released: 1971
- Genre: Soundtrack
- Length: 20:31
- Producer: T. Chalapathi Rao

Music composed by T. Chalapathi Rao.

S. No.	Song title	Lyrics	Singers	length
1	"Evaranukunnav"	Kosaraju	Ghantasala	2:33
2	"Chiru Chiru Navvula"	C. Narayana Reddy	P. Susheela	2:58
3	"Yavvanamante"	C. Narayana Reddy	L. R. Eeswari	2:44
4	"Appulu Cheyakyra"	Kosaraju	Madhavapeddi Satyam	3:59
5	"Kalla Kapatamerugani"	Dasarathi	Ghantasala, Jikki	3:38
6	"Edi Nijamaina"	Dasarathi	Ghantasala, Madhavapeddi Satyam, T. R. Jayadev, Saravathi	4:39
