= Bangaru Gaajulu =

1968 film by C. S. Rao

- Theatrical release poster
- Directed by: C. S. Rao
- Written by: Pinisetty Srirama Murthy (dialogues)
- Screenplay by: C. S. Rao
- Story by: Rajasri
- Produced by: Tammareddy Krishna Murthy
- Starring: Akkineni Nageswara Rao; Bharathi; Vijaya Nirmala
- Cinematography: Kamal Ghosh
- Edited by: Akkineni Sanjeevi
- Music by: T. Chalapathi Rao
- Production company: Ravindra Art Pictures
- Release date: 22 August 1968
- Running time: 165 mins
- Country: India
- Language: Telugu

Bangaru Gaajulu (transl. Golden bangles) is a 1968 Indian Telugu-language drama film directed by C. S. Rao from a story written by Rajasri. Produced by Tammareddy Krishna Murthy, it stars Akkineni Nageswara Rao, Bharathi, and Vijaya Nirmala with the music composed by T. Chalapathi Rao. Released on 22 August 1968, the film won Nandi Awards from the Government of Andhra Pradesh, including Third Best Feature Film and Best Story Writer (Rajasri).

== Plot ==
It is the story of a brother and sister (Akkineni Nageswara Rao and Vijaya Nirmala) who love each other very much, but get separated. The rest of the story is about their reunion.

== Cast ==
- Akkineni Nageshwara Rao as Ramu / Ravi
- Bharathi as Sarada
- Vijaya Nirmala as Radha & Radha (Dual role)
- Kanta Rao as Inspector Shekar
- Gummadi as Raja Rao
- Nagabhushanam as Raoji / Prakash
- Relangi as Venkataramayya
- Padmanabham as Avataram
- Jagga Rao as Daasu
- Suryakantam as Kantham
- Hemalatha as Sarada's mother
- Geetanjali as Navaneetam
- Radha Kumari as Durga

== Production ==
C. S. Rao scripted the film from the original story by Rajasri. The film has editing by Akkineni Sanjeev and cinematography by Kamal Ghosh. Art was handled by G. V. Subba Rao and choreography was by K. S. Reddy.

== Soundtrack ==
Music composed by T. Chalapathi Rao. The lyrics were written by Dasarathi, C. Narayana Reddy, Kosaraju, and Arudra with vocals by Ghantasala, P. Susheela, L. R. Eswari, Madhavapeddi Satyam, and Vasantha.

Bangaru Gaajulu

Film score by T. Chalapathi Rao
- Released: 1968
- Genre: Soundtrack
- Length: 28:08
- Producer: T. Chalapathi Rao

S. No.	Song title	Lyrics	Singers	length
1	"Annayya Sannidhi"	C. Narayana Reddy	P. Susheela	2:58
2	"Chellayi Pellikoothurayene"	C. Narayana Reddy	Ghantasala	3:35
3	"Vinnavinchukona"	Dasarathi	Ghantasala, P. Susheela	4:48
4	"Valapu Emiti Emiti"	Aarudhra	P. Susheela	3:37
5	"Aa Aalu Vastegaani"	Kosaraju	Madhavapeddi Sathyam, Vasantha	4:22
6	"Vegaleka Unnanura Maama"	C. Narayana Reddy	Ghantasala, L. R. Eswari	4:25
7	"Jaajiri Jaajiri"	C. Narayana Reddy	L. R. Eswari	4:23

== Awards ==
Nandi Awards

- Third Best Feature Film - Bronze - T. G. Krishnamurthy
- Second Best Story Writer - Rajasri
