= Palletooru =

- Theatrical release poster
- Directed by: T. Prakash Rao
- Written by: Sunkara; Vasireddy (story / dialogues)
- Screenplay by: T. Prakash Rao; M. S. Chowdary
- Produced by: P. Sivaramayya
- Starring: N. T. Rama Rao; Savitri
- Cinematography: Ajaykar; Vital
- Edited by: Nataraja Modaliyar
- Music by: Ghantasala
- Production company: People's Art Productions
- Release date: 16 October 1952
- Country: India
- Language: Telugu

Palletooru (transl. Village) is a 1952 Indian Telugu-language drama film by T. Prakash Rao in his directorial debut. It stars N. T. Rama Rao and Savitri with music composed by Ghantasala. It was produced by P. Sivaramayya under People's Art Productions banner. The film was a big hit and initiated a trend of films with rural settings and social themes.

== Cast ==
- N. T. Rama Rao as Chandram
- Savitri as Suguna
- S. V. Ranga Rao as Ganapati
- Ramana Reddy as Sankaram
- Mikkilineni as Lawyer
- Perumallu as Pichayya
- Chadalavada as Subbayya
- Nagabhushanam as Kondayya
- Koduuri Achayya as Sambayya
- T. G. Kamala Devi as Santha
- Hemalatha as Anasuya
- Vasundhara as Naagulu
- Seshamamba as Pichamma
- Padmavathi as Seetamma
- Baby Krishna Veni as Lalitha

== Soundtrack ==
Music was composed by Ghantasala. Lyrics were written by Sunkara and Vasireddy.

S. No.	Song title	Singers	length
1	"Vacchinadoyi Sankranti"	Ghantasala, P. Leela, B. Gopalam, Vakkalanka Sarala	3:45
2	"Raju Peda"	P. Leela, Jikki	
3	"Cheyetti Jai Kottu Telugoda"	Ghantasala	3:10
4	"Polaalananni Halaaladunni"	Ghantasala	3:37
5	"Aa Manasulona"	M. S. Rama Rao	3:13
6	"Amma Seetamma"	Ghantasala	3:06
7	"Desasevakula"		
8	"Aasa Nirasai Poyindi"		
9	"Korinadistadu"		
10	"Aa Sankrantiki Ee Sankrantiki"	Ghantasala	3:17
11	"Aandhruda Levara"	Chorus	1:49
