= Ramana Reddy =

Indian character actor, comedian and producer (1921–1974)

- Born: Tikkavarapu Venkata Ramana Reddy; 1 October 1921; Jagadevi Peta, Nellore District, Andhra Pradesh, India
- Died: 11 November 1974 (aged 53)
- Occupations: Actor; comedian
- Years active: 1951–1974
- Relatives: Pattabhirama Reddy; T. Subbarami Reddy
- Awards: Nandi Awards

Ramana Reddy (1 October 1921 – 11 November 1974) was an Indian character actor, comedian and producer known for his works predominantly in Telugu cinema. In a career spanning 24 years, he acted in more than 200 movies. Ramana Reddy and Relangi were a comedy double act during the era of early Telugu cinema.

Some of his memorable roles are David in Missamma (1955), Karanam in Rojulu Marayi (1955), Chinnamaya in Mayabazar (1957), Kanchu Gantayya in Gundamma Katha (1962). Ramana Reddy is the paternal uncle of Indian politician, and filmmaker T. Subbarami Reddy.

== Early life ==
Reddy was born on 1 October 1921 in Jagadevi Peta.

== Career ==
Ramana Reddy is regarded as one of the finest comic actors of India, noted particularly for his comic expressions, and dialogues during the golden age of Telugu cinema. He and Relangi were a comedy double act during the era of early Tollywood. Some of his memorable roles are David in Missamma, Karanam in Rojulu Marayi, Chinnamaya in Mayabazar, Kanchu Gantayya in Gundamma Katha and many other roles. During his career spanning 24 years he acted in more than 200 movies. Reddy is the paternal uncle of Indian politician, and filmmaker T. Subbarami Reddy.

== Death ==
He died on 11 November 1974.

== Filmography ==
=== 1950s ===
- Deeksha (1951)
- Aada Janma (1951)
- Manavathi (1952)
- Palleturu (1952)
- Puttillu (1953)
- Kanna Talli (1953)
- Pichi Pullayya (1953)
- Manjari (1953)
- Prathignya (1953)
- Antha Manavalle (1954)
- Nirupedalu (1954)
- Chakrapani (1954)
- Sangham (1954)
- Parivartana (1954)
- Bangaru Papa (1955)
- Missamma (1955)
- Beedala Asthi (1955)
- Rojulu Marayi (1955)
- Aadabidda (1955)
- Anthey Kavali (1955)
- Santhanam (1955)
- Edhi Nijam (1956)
- Sontha Vooru (1956)
- Ilavelupu (1956)
- Muddu Bidda (1956)
- Melukolupu (1956)
- Penki Pellam (1956)
- Charana Daasi (1956)
- Bhaktha Markandeya (1956)
- Bhagya Rekha (1957)
- Mayabazar (1957)
- Suvarna Sundari (1957)
- Veera Kankanam (1957)
- Varudu Kavali (1957)
- Sankalpam (1957) as Papaiah
- Akka Chellellu (1957)
- M L A (1957)
- Vaddante Pelli (1957) as Hanumanthaiah
- Bommala Pelli (1958)
- Ganga Gowri Samvadam (1958)
- Sobha (1958)
- Dongalunnaru Jagratha (1958)
- Atha Okinti Kodaley (1958)
- Kartavarayani Katha (1958)
- Pellinati Pramanalu (1958)
- Parvathi Kalyanam (1958)
- Mangalya Balam (1959)
- Appuchesi Pappukoodu (1959)
- Sati Sukanya (1959)
- Pelli Sandadi (1959)
- Jayabheri (1959)
- Illarikam (1959)
- Kuthuru Kapuram (1959)
- Maa Inti Mahalakshmi (1959)
- Sipoy Kuthuru (1959)
- Daiva Balam (1959)
- Manorama (1959)
- Banda Ramudu (1959)
- Alumagalu (1959)

=== 1960s ===
- Sri Venkateswara Mahatmyam (1960)
- Santhi Nivasam (1960)
- Renukadevi Mahatmyam (1960)
- Nityakalyanam Pacha Toranam (1960)
- Sahasra Siracheda Apoorva Chintamani (1960) as Kali
- Dharmame Jayam (1960)
- Magavari Mayalu (1960)
- Annapurna (1960)
- Pillalu Thechina Challani Rajyam (1960) as Deenadayaludu
- Vimala (1960)
- Deepavali (1960)
- Kadeddulu Ekara Nela (1960)
- Chivaraku Migiledi (1960)
- Ma Babu (1960)
- Intiki Deepam Illaley (1961)
- Bharya Bhartalu (1961)
- Sati Sulochana (1961)
- Kanna Koduku (1961)
- Gullo Pelli (1961)
- Pellikani Pillalu (1961)
- Thandrulu Kodukulu (1961)
- Bikari Ramudu (1961)
- Iddaru Mitrulu (1961)
- Padandi Munduku (1962)
- Gaali Medalu (1962)
- Aradhana (1962)
- Pelli Thambulam (1962)
- Manchi Manasulu (1962)
- Gundamma Katha (1962)
- Kalimilemulu (1962)
- Appaginthalu (1962)
- Kula Gothralu (1962)
- Siri Sampadalu (1962)
- Nagarjuna (1962)
- Raktha Sambandam (1962)
- Asha Jeevulu (1962)
- Chitti Tammudu (1962)
- Edureetha (1963)
- Pempudu Koothuru (1963)
- Lava Kusa (1963)
- Eedu Jodu (1963)
- Constable Koothuru (1963)
- Anuragam (1963)
- Anubandhalu (1963)
- Manchi Rojulu Vasthayi (1963)
- Bandipotu (1963) as Durjaya
- Punarjanma (1963)
- Lakshadhikari (1963)
- Tirupathamma Katha (1963)
- Poojaphalam (1964)
- Atmabalam (1964)
- Gudi Gantalu (1964)
- Muralikrishna (1964)
- Kalavari Kodalu (1964)
- Myravana (1964)
- Desa Drohulu (1964)
- Ramudu Bheemudu (1964)
- Peetala meedha Pelli (1964)
- Sri Satyanarayana Mahathyam (1964)
- Dagudu Moothalu (1964)
- Sabash Suri (1964)
- Manchi Manishi (1964)
- Naadi Aadajanmey (1965)
- Pandava Vanavasam (1965)
- Vuyyala Jampala (1965)
- Dorikithey Dongalu (1965)
- Mangamma Sapatham (1965)
- Chaduvukunna Bharya (1965)
- Satya Harichandra (1965)
- Keelu Bommalu (1965)
- Thodu Needa (1965)
- Anthastulu (1965)
- Devatha (1965)
- Manushulu Mamathalu (1965)
- C I D (1965)
- Aata Bommalu (1966)
- Aatma Gowravam (1966)
- Sakunthala (1966)
- Navarathri (1966)
- Bheemanjaneya Yuddham (1966)
- Potti Pleader (1966)
- Paduka Pattabhishekam (1966) as Siddhaiah
- Mangala Sutram (1966)
- Aggi Barata (1966)
- Chilaka Gorinka (1966)
- Sangitha Lakshmi (1966)
- Gudachari 116 (1966)
- Dr. Anand (1966)
- Mohini Bhasmasura (1966) as Sankham
- Rangula Ratnam (1967)
- Bhakta Prahlada (1967)
- Pinni (1967)
- Iddaru Monagallu (1967)
- Sati Sumathi (1967)
- Kanchukota (1967)
- Gruhalakshmi (1967)
- Chadarangam (1967)
- Satyame Jayam (1967)
- Nindu Manasulu (1967)
- Upayamlo Apayam (1967)
- Rahasyam (1967)
- Peddakkayya (1967)
- Ave Kallu (1967)
- Kambhoja Raju Katha (1967)
- Sukhaduhkalu (1968)
- Uma Chandi Gowri Sankarula Katha (1968)
- Brahmachari (1968)
- Bharya (1968)
- Ramu (1968)
- Mooga Jeevulu (1968)
- Chinnari Papalu (1968)
- Panthalu Pattimpulu (1968)
- Ninne Pelladutha (1968)
- Nindu Samsaram (1968)
- Ardha Rathri (1969)
- Adarsa Kutumbam (1969)

=== 1970s ===
- Thalla? Pellama? (1970)
- Amma Kosam (1970)
- Ma Manchi Akkayya (1970)
- Kodalu Diddina Kapuram (1970)
- Kiladi Singanna (1971)
- Manasu Mangalyam (1971)
- Mooga Prema (1971)
- Jeevitha Chakram (1971)
- Ananda Nilayam (1971)
- Pattindalla Bangaram (1971) as 'Rickshaw' Rangaiah
- Shrimantudu(1971)
- Bhale Papa(1971)
- Premanagar (1971)
- Ramalayam (1971)
- Tahsildargari Ammayi (1971)
- Pagapattina Paduchu (1971)
- Sri Krishna Sathya (1971)
- Beedhalapatlu (1972)
- Santhi Nilayam (1972)
- Sabash Papanna (1972)
- Sabash Baby (1972)
- Koduku Kodalu (1972)
- Bangaru Babu (1973)
- Stree (1973)
- Jeevana Tarangalu (1973)
- Jeevitham (1973)
- Devudamma (1973)
- Puttinillu Mettinillu (1973)
- Palleturi Bava (1973)
- Minor Babu (1973)
- Poolamala (1973)
- Manuvu Manasu (1973)
- Peddalu Marali (1974)
- Andaru Dongaley (1974)
- Thathamma Kala (1974)
- Bhoomi Kosam (1974) as Subbaiah
- Mugguru Ammayilu (1974)
- Satyaniki Sankellu (1974)
- Bhagasthulu(1975) Vendor selling utensils
- Cheekati Velugulu (1975)
