= Relangi (actor) =

Indian actor (1910–1975)

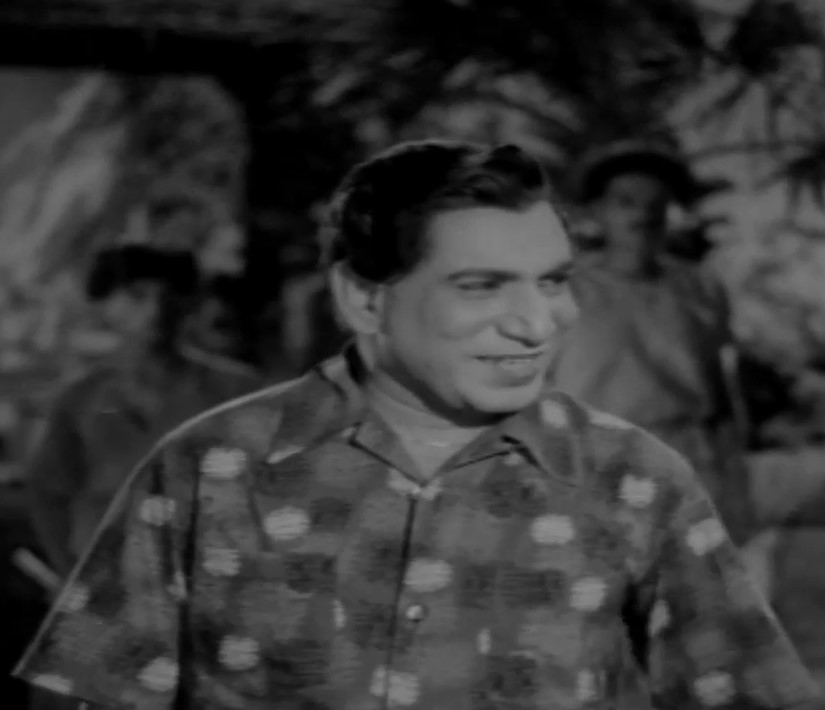
- Relangi in a scene from the Telugu film Aada Pettanam (1958)
- Born: Relangi Venkata Ramayya; Ravulapalem, Madras Presidency, British India (now Andhra Pradesh, India)
- Died: 27 November 1975 (aged 65); Tadepalligudem, Andhra Pradesh
- Occupations: Actor and playback singer
- Spouse: Sridevamma
- Awards: Padma Shri (1970)

Relangi Venkata Ramayya ( 13 August 1910 – 27 November 1975), known mononymously by his surname as Relangi, was an Indian actor, comedian, and producer known for his works predominantly in Telugu cinema. He was honoured with the Padma Shri for his contribution to Indian cinema in 1970. Relangi is particularly known for his comic expressions, and dialogues during the 1950s and 1960s. Together with Ramana Reddy, they were a comedy double act.

Notable Relangi performances include films like Gunasundari Katha (1949), Vipra Narayana (1954), Missamma (1955), Donga Ramudu (1955), Mayabazar (1957), Appu Chesi Pappu Koodu (1958), Velugu Needalu (1961), Iddaru Mitrulu (1961), Kula Gothralu (1962), Lava Kusa (1963), Chaduvukunna Ammayilu (1963), Nartanasala (1963), and Preminchi Choodu (1965). The Relangi Art Academy Award was instituted in his honour for best comic performances.

== Early life ==
Relangi was born in the village of Ravulapalem in the East Godavari district in Madras State (now Andhra Pradesh). He was a professional Harikatha performer and also an expert Harmonium player. He grew up in Kakinada; however, he didn't show interest in education due to his passion for acting.

== Career ==
Relangi started his initial career acting in stage and folk theatre and also took female roles in stage theatre. He started his film career by playing a Vidushaka (Jester) role in his first Telugu film Sri Krishna Tulabharam in 1935 under the direction of C. Pullayya. Later on, he assisted Pullayya as a Production Manager until he got a major break with the film Gollabhama released in 1947. Subsequently, he played a comedic role in Vindhyarani (1948), which was a big hit. He was a regular face in all the movies made under the Vijaya Films banner from 1950. He grew so popular that he was given a chance to play a comedic hero role in Pakka inti Ammayi in 1953 under Pullayya opposite Anjali Devi.

As a comedic actor, he was quite popular when partnered with actress Girija, actress Suryakantham, and another comedian actor, Ramana Reddy. These combinations were repeated for several hit movies in Telugu. Some of the well-known movies in which Relangi acted are shown below.

== Filmography ==
=== Telugu ===
Year	Film	Role	Notes
1935	Sri Krishna Tulabharam	Vidushaka	
1939	Vara Vikrayam		
1940	Malathi Madhavam		
1942	Bala Nagamma	Kotwal Rama Singh	
1947	Gollabhama	Friend of Prince	
1948	Vindhyarani		
1949	Keelu Gurram	Govindudu	
1949	Gunasundari Katha	Kalamati	
1949	Mana Desam	Constable No. 144	
1950	Samsaram	Tataram	
1950	Maaya Rambha		
1950	Paramanandayya Shishyulu		
1950	Shavukaru		
1951	Navvite Navaratnalu		
1951	Pathala Bhairavi	Surasena	
1951	Perantaalu		
1951	Agni Pariksha		
1952	Prema		
1952	Dharma Devatha		
1952	Daasi		
1952	Manavati		
1952	Priyuralu		
1952	Tingu Ranga		
1952	Peda Rythu		
1953	Paradesi		
1953	Pakka Inti Ammayi		
1953	Chandirani		
1953	Bratuku Theruvu		
1954	Peddamanushulu		
1954	Chandraharam		
1954	Raju Peda		
1954	Vipra Narayana		
1955	Rani Ratnaprabha		
1955	Cherapakura Chedevu	Pitambaram	
1955	Jayasimha		
1955	Missamma		
1955	Ardhangi		
1955	Rojulu Marayi		
1955	Santhanam		
1955	Donga Ramudu		
1956	Jayam Manade		
1956	Bhale Ramudu		
1956	Chintamani		
1956	Charana Daasi		
1957	Nala Damayanthi		
1957	Veera Kankanam		
1957	Todi Kodallu		
1957	Sarangadhara		
1957	Kutumba Gowravam		
1957	Dongallo Dora		
1957	Bhagya Rekha		
1957	Allauddin Adhbhuta Deepam		
1957	Maya Bazaar		
1957	Suvarna Sundari		
1958	Mangalya Balam		
1958	Bhooloka Rambha	Vasanthudu	
1958	Manchi Manasuku Manchi Rojulu		
1958	Chenchu Lakshmi		
1958	Appu Chesi Pappu Koodu		
1959	Krishna Leelalu	Nanda	
1959	Jayabheri		
1959	Illarikam		
1959	Nammina Bantu		
1960	Bhatti Vikramarka		
1960	Shanthi Nivasam		
1960	Samajam		
1960	Pelli Kanuka		
1960	Mamaku Tagga Alludu		
1960	Vagdanam		
1961	Usha Parinayam		
1961	Sabhash Raja		
1961	Velugu Needalu		
1961	Iddaru Mitrulu	Padmanabhaiah|	
1961	Bharya Bharthalu		
1961	Bhakta Jayadeva		
1961	Jagadeka Veeruni Katha		
1961	Kalasi Vunte Kaladu Sukham		
1962	Khaidi Kannaiah		
1962	Siri Sampadalu		
1962	Raktha Sambandham		
1962	Mohini Rugmangada		
1962	Kula Gothralu		
1962	Bhishma		
1962	Aradhana		
1962	Tiger Ramudu		
1962	Mahamantri Timmarusu		
1962	Aasa Jeevulu		
1963	Chaduvukunna Ammayilu		
1963	Lakshadhikari		
1963	Lava Kusa		
1963	Paruvu Prathishta		
1963	Narthanasala		
1964	Ramudu Bheemudu		
1964	Pooja Phalam		
1964	Aathma Balam		
1965	Sri Simhachala Kshetra Mahima		
1965	Satya Harishchandra		
1965	Preminchi Choodu		
1965	Chitti Chellelu		
1965	Antastulu		
1965	Aatma Gowravam		
1966	Navaratri		
1966	Leta Manasulu		
1966	Aastiparulu		
1966	Srikakula Andhra Maha Vishnu Katha		
1966	Pidugu Ramudu		
1967	Ummadi Kutumbham		
1967	Rahasyam		
1967	Private Master		
1967	Goodachari 116		
1967	Bhakta Prahlada		
1967	Aada Paduchu		
1968	Thalli Prema		
1969	Sri Rama Katha	Pragalbhacharyulu	
1969	Bhale Tammudu		
1969	Mathru Devata		
1969	Karpura Harathi	Somasundaram	
1969	Asthulu Anthastulu		
1969	Bhale Abbayilu	Zamindar	
1970	Talli Tandrulu		
1970	Pettandarulu		
1970	Vidhi Vilasam	Thirupathi	
1971	Jeevitha Chakram		
1971	Bhale Papa		
1972	Kalavari Kutumbam	Raghava Rao	
1973	Ganga Manga		
1973	Doctor Babu	Jagannatha Rao	
1973	Meena	Narasimha Rao	
1974	Nippulanti Manishi		
1974	Uttama Illalu	Pittala Dora	
1975	Mallela Manasulu	Malmal Seth	
1975	Pooja		

=== Tamil ===
Year	Film	Role	Notes
1951	Pathala Bhairavi	Surasena	
1952	Kaadhal		
1953	Velaikari Magal		
1953	Chandirani	Mukunda	

=== Singer ===
Some of the well-known songs sung by Relangi are in the following movies:

Year	Film	Song
1949	Gunasundari Katha	"Adive Eduraivachche Daka Padara Munduku Padipodam"
1951	Patala Bhairavi	"Talalene Ne Talalene" "Vinave Bala Naa Prema Gola"
1952	Dharma Devata	"Virise Vennelalo"
1954	Vipra Narayana	"Aadadhi Ante Layam Layam Aa Needantene Bhayam Bhayam"
1954	Pedda Manushulu	"Siva Siva Moortivi Gananaadhaa"
1955	Missamma	"Dharmam Cheyyi Babu Kaani Dharmam" "Seetaram Seetaram Seetaram Jai Seetaram"
1966	Paramanandayya Shishyula Katha	

=== Producer ===
- Relangi acted and produced the film Samajam in 1960.
- Relangi owned a Theater in Tadepalligudem - Relangi Theater.

== Awards and legacy ==
- In 1970, he was awarded the Padma Shri, a civilian award from the Government of India.
- In the 2019 movie N.T.R: Kathanayakudu, Brahmanandam portrayed him.
