= List of songs recorded by P. Bhanumathi =

Bhanumathi Ramakrishna (1925–2005) was an actress and playback singer in Hindi, Tamil and Telugu cinema. She has sung nearly 150 Tamil songs. The following is a list of her songs. Telugu movies songs are not completely listed.

== Telugu songs ==
Year	Film	Song	Composer(s)	Lyrics	Co-singer(s)
1939	Vara Vikrayam	"Palukavemi Naa Daivama"	Prabhala Satyanarayana	N/A	
1940	Malathi Madhavam				
1941	Dharma Patni	"Anuraagam Leka Anandamunda"	Annasaheb Mainkar, Timir Baran	Daita Gopalam	solo
1941	Dharma Patni	"Nilu Niluma Neelavarnaa"	Annasaheb Mainkar, Timir Baran	Balijepalli Lakshmikantham	solo
1943	Krishna Prema				
1945	Swarga Seema	"Madhura Vennelareyi"	Ogirala Ramachandra Rao, Balantrapu Rajanikanta Rao, Nagayya	Samudrala Sr.	Nagayya
1945	Swarga Seema	"Oh Naa Raaja"	Ogirala Ramachandra Rao, Balantrapu Rajanikanta Rao, Nagayya	Samudrala Sr.	Ghantasala
1945	Swarga Seema	"Manchidinamu Nede"	Ogirala Ramachandra Rao, Balantrapu Rajanikanta Rao, Nagayya	N/A	solo
1945	Swarga Seema	"Oho Ho Pavuram"	Ogirala Ramachandra Rao, Balantrapu Rajanikanta Rao, Nagayya	Balantrapu Rajanikanta Rao	solo
1945	Swarga Seema	"Oho Tapodhana"	Ogirala Ramachandra Rao, Balantrapu Rajanikanta Rao, Nagayya	Balantrapu Rajanikanta Rao	solo
1946	Gruha Pravesam				
1948	Ratnamala				
1949	Laila Majnu	"Neevene Naa Chaduvu"	C. R. Subburaman	Samudrala Sr.	Ghantasala, P. Leela, Jikki
1949	Laila Majnu	"Aaha Pahliyanchega"	C. R. Subburaman	Samudrala Sr.	solo
1949	Laila Majnu	"Ninu Basi Povudana"	C. R. Subburaman	Samudrala Sr.	solo
1949	Laila Majnu	"Preme Neramounaa"	C. R. Subburaman	Samudrala Sr.	solo
1949	Laila Majnu	"Tanedano"	C. R. Subburaman	Samudrala Sr.	solo
1949	Laila Majnu	"Viritavula Lona"	C. R. Subburaman	Samudrala Sr.	Ghantasala
1949	Laila Majnu	"Cherararo"	C. R. Subburaman	Samudrala Sr.	Ghantasala
1949	Laila Majnu	"Raavo Naanu Marachitivo"	C. R. Subburaman	Samudrala Sr.	Ghantasala
1949	Laila Majnu	"Chelunigani Nijamidani"	C. R. Subburaman	Samudrala Sr.	Ghantasala
1949	Raksha Rekha	"Oho Rajasukumara"	H. R. Padmanabha Sastry, Ogirala Ramachandra Rao	Balijepalli Lakshmikantham	solo
1949	Raksha Rekha	"Abhayammu Neevega"	H. R. Padmanabha Sastry, Ogirala Ramachandra Rao	Balijepalli Lakshmikantham	solo
1949	Raksha Rekha	"Jeevana Doli"	H. R. Padmanabha Sastry, Ogirala Ramachandra Rao	Balijepalli Lakshmikantham	Ghantasala
1950	Apoorva Sahodaralu				
1950	Malleeswari				
1951	Mangala	"Jhanan Jhanana"	M. D. Parthasarathy	N/A	solo
1952	Prema				
1953	Chandirani	"Eeroju Bhale Roju Ide Prema Idena"	M. S. Viswanathan, C. R. Subburaman	Samudrala Sr.	solo
1953	Chandirani	"Indhuko Teliyani Ennadu Anukoni Ee Sambaraalemiti"	M. S. Viswanathan, C. R. Subburaman	Samudrala Sr.	solo
1953	Chandirani	"Evaraalakinturu Naamora Enaleni Vedana"	M. S. Viswanathan, C. R. Subburaman	Samudrala Sr.	solo
1953	Chandirani	"Kilaa Kilaa Navvulaa Kurisene Vennelaa"	M. S. Viswanathan, C. R. Subburaman	Samudrala Sr.	solo
1953	Chandirani	"O Taraka O Jabilee Navvulela Nanu Gane"	M. S. Viswanathan, C. R. Subburaman	Samudrala Sr.	Ghantasala
1954	Chakrapani	"Uyyala Jampalala"	Bhanumathi Ramakrishna	Ravuri Satyanarayana Rao	solo
1954	Chakrapani	"Pakkala Nilabadi"	Bhanumathi Ramakrishna	Ravuri Satyanarayana Rao	solo
1954	Chakrapani	"Mella Mellagaa"	Bhanumathi Ramakrishna	Ravuri Satyanarayana Rao	solo
1954	Chakrapani	"O Malathi Lata"	Bhanumathi Ramakrishna	Ravuri Satyanarayana Rao	solo
	Aggi Ramudu				
1954	Vipra Narayana				
1956	Chintamani				
1956	Tenali Ramakrishna				
1957	Varudu Kaavali				
	Sarangadhara				
1959	Nala Damayanthi				
1961	Batasari	"Kanulakudoche Chetikandani"	Master Venu	Samudrala Sr.	Jikki
1961	Batasari	"Lokamerugani Baala"	Master Venu	Samudrala Sr.	solo
1961	Batasari	"O Batasari"	Master Venu	Samudrala Sr.	solo
1961	Batasari	"Uppakara Chinthaye"	Master Venu	Samudrala Sr.	solo
1963	Anuragam	"Sannajaji teeveloi sampenga poovuloi"			
1964	Bobbili Yuddham				
1964	Vivaha Bandham	"Vinnava Aah vinnava" "Nagumonu Ganaleni" "Alumagalu vidipoyenanthane" "Neetilona ningilona" "Neetilona ningilona" (sad)			solo P.B.Srinivas
1965	Antastulu	"Dulapara Bulloda"	K. V. Mahadevan	Kosaraju	solo
1965	Antastulu	"Vinara Vissanna"	K. V. Mahadevan	Aarudhra	solo
1965	Thodu Needa	"Enno Ratrulu"	K. V. Mahadevan	Acharya Aatreya	solo
1965	Thodu Needa	"Jolapata" "when i was"	K. V. Mahadevan	Acharya Aatreya	solo
1966	Palnati Yuddham				
1967	Gruhalakshmi	.			
1971	Mattilo Manikyam	"Saranam Nee Divya Charanam Nee"	C. Satyam		solo
1973	Vichitra Vivaham	"Ammayilu abbayilu naa matalo"			
1974	Ammayi Pelli				
1974	Tatamma Kala				
1984	Mangammagari Manavadu	"Sri Suryanarayana"	K. V. Mahadevan	C. Narayana Reddy	Vani Jayaram
1989	Bamma Maata Bangaru Bata	"Maa Palle Gopaluda"	Chandrabose	Veturi	P. Susheela, S. P. Balasubrahmanyam
1989	Bamma Maata Bangaru Bata	"Delhi Ki Raja Aina"	Chandrabose	Veturi	solo
1992	Chamanthi	"Chamanthi poovu"	Ilayaraja		
1998	Pelli Kanuka	"Bangaru Bommaki"	M.M. Keeravani	Sirivennela Sitarama Sastry	S. P. Balasubrahmanyam

== Tamil songs ==
Year	Film	Song	Composer(s)	Lyrics	Co-singer(s)
1946	Raja Mukthi	"Sarasa Sallaabam Seiyya Arugil Vaarumaiyya"	C. R. Subbaraman	Papanasam Sivan	solo
1946	Raja Mukthi	"Swaami Arunkanigal Ivaiye Pareer"	C. R. Subbaraman	Papanasam Sivan	M. K. Thyagaraja Bhagavathar
1946	Raja Mukthi	"Sandhoshamaai Anbar Varuvaaradi"	C. R. Subbaraman	Papanasam Sivan	M. L. Vasanthakumari
1948	Devamanohari	"Mathana nee vaa" "Indirano ivar chandhirano"			solo
1949	Apoorva Sagodharargal	"Aaha Aaduvene Geetham Paaduvene"	S. Rajeswara Rao	Kothamangalam Subbu	T. A. Mothi
1949	Apoorva Sagodharargal	"Laddu Laddu Mittai Venumaa"	S. Rajeswara Rao	Kothamangalam Subbu	solo
1949	Apoorva Sagodharargal	"Maanum Mayilum Aadum Solai"	S. Rajeswara Rao	Kothamangalam Subbu	solo
1949	Apoorva Sagodharargal	"Manamohaname Vana Vaasame"	S. Rajeswara Rao	Kothamangalam Subbu	solo
1949	Laila Majnu	"Nee Thaane Ennaasai"	C. R. Subbaraman	S. D. Sundharam	Ghantasala, P. Leela & Jikki
1949	Laila Majnu	"Aaha Palan Vandhadhe"	C. R. Subbaraman	S. D. Sundharam	solo
1949	Laila Majnu	"Unnai Paarkka Pogirenaa"	C. R. Subbaraman	S. D. Sundharam	solo
1949	Laila Majnu	"Premaithaan Polladhaa"	C. R. Subbaraman	S. D. Sundharam	solo
1949	Laila Majnu	"N/A	C. R. Subbaraman	S. D. Sundharam	solo
1949	Laila Majnu	"Iga Vaazhvinil Kaadhal Mahaajothiye"	C. R. Subbaraman	S. D. Sundharam	Ghantasala
1949	Laila Majnu	"Jothi Minnum"	C. R. Subbaraman	S. D. Sundharam	Ghantasala
1949	Laila Majnu	"Vaaraayo Enai Marandhanaiyo"	C. R. Subbaraman	S. D. Sundharam	Ghantasala
1949	Laila Majnu	"Enadhu Uyir Urugum Nilai"	C. R. Subbaraman	S. D. Sundharam	Ghantasala
1949	Nallathambi	"Malarthanil Oru Azhagu Mayil"	C. R. Subbaraman	Udumalai Narayana Kavi	Ghantasala
1949	Nallathambi	"Enadhu Uyir Egypttu"	C. R. Subbaraman	Udumalai Narayana Kavi	solo
1949	Nallathambi	"Varuvaare Dear Varuvaare"	C. R. Subbaraman	Udumalai Narayana Kavi	solo
1949	Nallathambi	"Naan Vanangum Dheivam"	C. R. Subbaraman	Udumalai Narayana Kavi	solo
1949	Ratnakumar	"Nin Paaadham Varave Thaaye Nee Dhayai Purivaaiye"	G. Ramanathan and C. R. Subbaraman	Papanasam Sivan	solo
1949	Ratnakumar	"Aadavar Kaadhal Idhudhaano"	G. Ramanathan and C. R. Subbaraman	Papanasam Sivan	solo
1949	Ratnakumar	"Varattum Vandhaal Vazhi Solven"	G. Ramanathan and C. R. Subbaraman	Papanasam Sivan	solo
1949	Ratnakumar	"Vizhudhu Vittu Thazhaithongi"	G. Ramanathan and C. R. Subbaraman	Papanasam Sivan	solo
1949	Ratnakumar	"Muzhuthunnai Nambinen"	G. Ramanathan and C. R. Subbaraman	Papanasam Sivan	solo
1949	Ratnakumar	"Ganavaangale Vaango"	G. Ramanathan and C. R. Subbaraman	Papanasam Sivan	P. U. Chinnappa
1949	Ratnakumar	"Aanandha Velaam"	G. Ramanathan and C. R. Subbaraman	Papanasam Sivan	P. U. Chinnappa
1949	Ratnakumar	"Andhi Nerame Inbame"	G. Ramanathan and C. R. Subbaraman	Papanasam Sivan	P. U. Chinnappa
1949	Ratnakumar	"Sollarum Aanandham Enadhu Vaazhvil Indre Dhuraiye"	G. Ramanathan and C. R. Subbaraman	Papanasam Sivan	P. U. Chinnappa
1952	Kaadhal	"Inba Kaaviyam Aagum Vaazhve"	C. R. Subburaman	K. D. Santhanam	Ghantasala
1952	Kaadhal	"Jeevidhamellaam"	C. R. Subburaman	K. D. Santhanam	Ghantasala
1952	Kaadhal	"Aahaa Inbame Aahaa Engume"	C. R. Subburaman	K. D. Santhanam	solo
1952	Kaadhal	"Kanavu Thaano Ninaivu Yaavum", "Kalyaname namma kalyaname" , "Kanavudhano ninaivuyavum", "Maya ulagile", "Vaazhvellam Pazhadhanadhe", "Aaha naan adaindhen"	C. R. Subburaman	K. D. Santhanam	solo
1952	Rani	"Naane Gnaaniyar"	C. R. Subbaraman, D. C. Dutt	K. D. Santhanam	solo
1952	Rani	"Madhi Mayangum Malar Vanam"	C. R. Subbaraman, D. C. Dutt	K. D. Santhanam	solo
1952	Rani	"Karugi Pugaiyum Pugaiye"	C. R. Subbaraman, D. C. Dutt	T. K. Sundara Vathiyar	solo
1952	Rani	"Unmaiyillaadha Ulagile"	C. R. Subbaraman, D. C. Dutt	T. K. Sundara Vathiyar	solo
1952	Rani	"Samayam Vaachchadhu"	C. R. Subbaraman, D. C. Dutt	T. K. Sundara Vathiyar	solo
1952	Rani	"Cheeppu Chunukkani Chimini"	C. R. Subbaraman, D. C. Dutt	Udumalai Narayana Kavi	solo
1952	Rani	"Samarasam Nilaiperum"	C. R. Subbaraman, D. C. Dutt	Udumalai Narayana Kavi	C. R. Subburaman and group
1953	Chandirani	"En Vaazhvinile Naan Magizhum Naal Idhuve Thaan"	M. S. Viswanathan, C. R. Subburaman	K. D. Santhanam	solo
1953	Chandirani	"Innadhendru Ariyaamal Unnmaiyum Unaraamal"	M. S. Viswanathan, C. R. Subburaman	K. D. Santhanam	solo
1953	Chandirani	"En Vaazhvellaam Siraivaasamo"	M. S. Viswanathan, C. R. Subburaman	K. D. Santhanam	solo
1953	Chandirani	"Nilaa Nilaa Odi Vaa Nillaamal Odi Vaa"	M. S. Viswanathan, C. R. Subburaman	K. D. Santhanam	solo
1953	Chandirani	"Vaan Meedhile Inba Then Maari Peiyudhe"	M. S. Viswanathan, C. R. Subburaman	K. D. Santhanam	Ghantasala
1954	Malaikkallan	"Unnai Azhaithathu Yaaro"	M. Subbaiah Naidu	Thanjai N. Ramaiah Dass	solo
1954	Malaikkallan	"Pengale Ulangalile"	M. Subbaiah Naidu	Venkatarama Ramalingam Pillai	solo
1954	Malaikkallan	"Nalla Sagunam Nokki"	M. Subbaiah Naidu	Venkatarama Ramalingam Pillai	solo
1954	Malaikkallan	"Naane Inba Roja"	M. Subbaiah Naidu	Thanjai N. Ramaiah Dass	solo
1954	Malaikkallan	"Naalai"	M. Subbaiah Naidu		solo
1955	Kalvanin Kadhali	"Manadhil Urudhi Vendum"	G. Govindarajulu Naidu & Ghantasala	Mahakavi Bharathiyar	T. M. Soundararajan
1955	Kalvanin Kadhali	"Nallathor Veenai Seidhe"	G. Govindarajulu Naidu & Ghantasala	Mahakavi Bharathiyar	solo
1955	Kalvanin Kadhali	"Alli Malar Solai Inba"	G. Govindarajulu Naidu & Ghantasala	S. D. Sundharam	A. P. Komala & K. Rani
1955	Kalvanin Kadhali	"Veyilukketha Nizhalundu"	G. Govindarajulu Naidu & Ghantasala	Kavimani Desigavinayagam Pillai	Ghantasala
1955	Vipra Narayana	"Malaril Madhuvellaam"	S. Rajeswara Rao		A. M. Rajah
1955	Vipra Narayana	"Ini Aagatha Sogam"	S. Rajeswara Rao		A. M. Rajah
1955	Vipra Narayana	"Naayagane Jaya Geeta Radha"	S. Rajeswara Rao		solo
1956	Alibabavum 40 Thirudargalum	"Masila Unmai Kathale"	S. Dakshinamurthy	A. Maruthakasi	A. M. Rajah
1956	Alibabavum 40 Thirudargalum	"Azhagaana Ponnu Naan"	S. Dakshinamurthy	A. Maruthakasi	solo
1956	Alibabavum 40 Thirudargalum	"Unnaivida Maattaen"	S. Dakshinamurthy	A. Maruthakasi	solo
1956	Alibabavum 40 Thirudargalum	"Anbinaale Aalavandha"	S. Dakshinamurthy	A. Maruthakasi	solo
1956	Alibabavum 40 Thirudargalum	"En Aattamellaam"	S. Dakshinamurthy	A. Maruthakasi	solo
1956	Madurai Veeran	"Avarkkum Enakkum"	G. Ramanathan	Kannadasan	solo
1956	Rambaiyin Kaadhal	"Kannaala Vaazhvile Kaadhal"	T. R. Papa	Thanjai N. Ramaiah Dass	solo
1956	Rambaiyin Kaadhal	"Aadavaareer Indre Aadavaareer"	T. R. Papa	Thanjai N. Ramaiah Dass	solo
1956	Rambaiyin Kaadhal	"Kannaala Vaazhvile Kaadhal"	T. R. Papa	Thanjai N. Ramaiah Dass	P. Susheela
1956	Rangoon Radha	"Thalaivaari Poochoodi Unnai"	T. R. Pappa	Bharathidasan	solo
1956	Rangoon Radha	"Pennaga Irundha Yennai ...Kaiyil Pirambedutthu"	T. R. Pappa	M. K. Athmanathan	solo
1956	Rangoon Radha	"Thamizhe Thene Kanne Thaalelo"	T. R. Pappa	M. Karunanidhi	solo
1956	Rangoon Radha	"Vaan Malar Solaiyil"	T. R. Pappa	M. Karunanidhi	solo
1956	Sadhaaram	"Ponggi Varum Pudhu Nilavee"	G. Ramanathan	Thanjai N. Ramaiah Dass and A. Maruthakasi	T. M. Soundararajan
1956	Sadhaaram	"Thaaye Ezhai Mugam"	G. Ramanathan	Thanjai N. Ramaiah Dass and A. Maruthakasi	solo
1956	Sadhaaram	"Enggum Oli Veesudhe Ennai Thedi"	G. Ramanathan	Thanjai N. Ramaiah Dass and A. Maruthakasi	A. P. Komala & A. G. Rathnamala
1956	Tenali Raman	"Kangalil Adidum Penmaiyin Nadagam"	Viswanathan Ramamoorthy	Kannadasan	solo
1956	Tenali Raman	"Kannamirandum Minnidum Annam"	Viswanathan Ramamoorthy	Kannadasan	solo
1956	Tenali Raman	"Pirandha Naal Mannan Pirandha Naal"	Viswanathan Ramamoorthy	Kannadasan	solo
1956	Tenali Raman	"Vinnulagil Minni Varum Tharagaiye"	Viswanathan Ramamoorthy	Kannadasan	solo
1956	Thaaikkuppin Thaaram	"Aaha Nam Aaasai"	K. V. Mahadevan	Kavi Lakshmanadas	T. M. Soundararajan
1956	Thaaikkuppin Thaaram	"Asaindhaadum Thendrale"	K. V. Mahadevan	Thanjai N. Ramiah Dass	solo
1956	Thaaikkuppin Thaaram	"En Kaadhal Inbam"	K. V. Mahadevan	Thanjai N. Ramiah Dass	A. M. Rajah
1957	Ambikapathy	"Kannile Iruppathenna Kanniyila Mane"	G. Ramanathan	Kannadasan	solo
1957	Ambikapathy	"Maasila Nilave Nam Kaadhalil Magizhvodu"	G. Ramanathan	Ku. Ma. Balasubramaniam	T. M. Soundararajan
1957	Ambikapathy	"Vaada Malare Thamizhthene"	G. Ramanathan	K. D. Santhanam	T. M. Soundararajan
1957	Makkalai Petra Magarasi	"Sonna Pechcha Kekkanum"	K. V. Mahadevan	A. Maruthakasi	solo
1957	Makkalai Petra Magarasi	"Vandhadhu Yaarunu"	K. V. Mahadevan	A. Maruthakasi	solo
1957	Makkalai Petra Magarasi	"Poravale Poravale Ponnurangam"	K. V. Mahadevan	Thanjai N. Ramaiah Dass	T. M. Soundararajan
1957	Manamagan Thevai	"Yengo Kulukku Thalukku Thavalaiyaa"	G. Ramanathan	A. Maruthakasi	solo
1957	Manamagan Thevai	"Krishna Nee Begane Maaro.... Malaharaa Verengum Palaa"	G. Ramanathan		solo
1957	Manamagan Thevai	"Nenjinile Pugundhu"	G. Ramanathan	A. Maruthakasi	solo
1957	Manamagan Thevai	"Velavare Ummai Thedi Oru Madandhai"	G. Ramanathan	Ghanam Krishna Iyer	solo
1957	Manamagan Thevai	"Vennilaa Jodhiyai Veesudhe"	G. Ramanathan	A. Maruthakasi	Ghantasala & Pithapuram Nageswara Rao
1957	Manamagan Thevai	"Nan Thaan Un Kaadhalan"	G. Ramanathan	A. Maruthakasi	Seerkazhi Govindarajan
1957	Rani Lalithangi	""Inbam Perinbam"	G. Ramanathan	Thanjai N. Ramaiah Dass	solo
1957	Rani Lalithangi	"Madhunilai Maaraadha"	G. Ramanathan	Thanjai N. Ramaiah Dass	solo
1957	Rani Lalithangi	"Ennai Ariyaamal Thulludhadi"	G. Ramanathan	Thanjai N. Ramaiah Dass	solo
1958	Sarangadhara	"Arpudha Kaatchi Ondru Kanden"	G. Ramanathan	A. Maruthakasi	solo
1958	Sarangadhara	"Vandhiduvaar Avar En Manam"	G. Ramanathan	A. Maruthakasi	solo
1958	Sarangadhara	"Kannaal Nalla Paaru"	G. Ramanathan	A. Maruthakasi	A. P. Komala & K. Rani
1958	Nadodi Mannan	"Sammadhamaa Naan Ungal"	S. M. Subbaiah Naidu & N. S. Balakrishnan	N. M. Muthukkoothan	solo
1958	Nadodi Mannan	"Summa Kedandha"	S. M. Subbaiah Naidu & N. S. Balakrishnan	Pattukkottai Kalyanasundaram	T. M. Soundararajan
1959	Manimekalai	"Kanngalin Vennilave"	G. Ramanathan	Kambadasan	T. R. Mahalingam
1959	Manimekalai	"Ulagame Oru Sirachchaalai"	G. Ramanathan	Kambadasan	solo
1959	Manimekalai	"Aadhaaram Unnai Allaaal"	G. Ramanathan	Kambadasan	solo
1959	Manimekalai	"Inbam Inbam Inbam"	G. Ramanathan	A. Maruthakasi	solo
1959	Nala Damayanthi	"Sarasam Seiyadhe Maname"	B. Gopalam	Puratchidasan	solo
1959	Nala Damayanthi	"Jai Bavani Dhayaarpari"	B. Gopalam	Puratchidasan	solo
1959	Nala Damayanthi	"Nan Konda Koyil Endha"	B. Gopalam	Puratchidasan	solo
1959	Nala Damayanthi	"Nin Paadha Dhaasi"	B. Gopalam	Puratchidasan	solo
1959	Nala Damayanthi	"Thee Vinayo Nenjam Mariyadho"	B. Gopalam	Kuyilan	solo
1959	Nala Damayanthi	"Amma Puviyaalum Mathaa"	B. Gopalam	Kuyilan	solo
1960	Raja Desingu	"Sarasaraani Kalyani"	G. Ramanathan	Kannadasan	C. S. Jayaraman
1960	Raja Desingu	"Iyalodu Isaipole"	G. Ramanathan	Thanjai N. Ramaiah Dass	C. S. Jayaraman
1961	Kaanal Neer	"Kannil Therindhum Kaikku Varaadha"	Master Venu	Kannadasan	Jikki
1961	Kaanal Neer	"Anbaana Enname Paavama"	Master Venu	Ku. Ma. Balasubramaniam	solo
1961	Kaanal Neer	"Ulagam Theriyaa Payire"	Master Venu	Kannadasan	solo
1961	Kaanal Neer	"Vazhi Thedi Vandhaai"	Master Venu	Kannadasan	solo
1962	Annai	"Annai Enbadhu Neethaana"	R. Sudharsanam	Kannadasan	solo
1962	Annai	"Poovaagi Kaayaagi"	R. Sudharsanam	Kannadasan	solo
1962	Annai	"Poovaagi Kaayaagi" (pathos)	R. Sudharsanam	Kannadasan	solo
1963	Arivaali	"Koovatha Inbakkuyil Koovum"	S. V. Venkatraman	A. Maruthakasi	solo
1963	Arivaali	"Pattuppol Meni", "En Kobam Pollathadhu"	S. V. Venkatraman	A. Maruthakasi	T. M. Soundararajan
1963	Arivaali	"Venkata Ramana"	S. V. Venkatraman	Papanasam Sivan	
1963	Kaanchi Thalaivan	"Mayangatha Manamyaavum Mayangum"	K. V. Mahadevan	Alangudi Somu	solo
1963	Kalai Arasi	"Singaaraa Vaa Vaa"	K. V. Mahadevan	N. M. Muthukoothan	solo
1963	Kalai Arasi	"Aasai Vaikkira Idam Theriyanum"	K. V. Mahadevan	Pattukkottai Kalyanasundaram	Jikki
1963	Kalai Arasi	"Ninaikkum Pothu Nenjum Kannum"	K. V. Mahadevan	Pattukkottai Kalyanasundaram	solo
1963	Kalai Arasi	"Kalaiye Un Ezhil Meni"	K. V. Mahadevan	Kannadasan	Seerkazhi Govindarajan
1965	Sarasa B.A.	"Kannondru Naanum"	Vedha	Kannadasan	solo
1965	Sarasa B.A.	"Manathil Manathai"	Vedha	Kannadasan	solo
1965	Sarasa B.A.	"Naan Vizhikkum"	Vedha	Kannadasan	solo
1967	Pattathu Rani	"Munnale Oru Ponnu"	T. K. Ramamoorthy		solo
1967	Pattathu Rani	"Sitthan Pokku Sivan Pooku"	T. K. Ramamoorthy		solo
1974	Pathu Madha Bandham	"Let me try"			
1974	Pathu Madha Bandham	"Irandu Thaaikku Oru Magal"	Shankar-Ganesh	Kannadasan	solo
1974	Pathu Madha Bandham	"Raamanukku Mannan Mudi"	Shankar-Ganesh	Kannadasan	solo
1974	Swathi Nakshathram	"Heart To Heart"	V. Kumar	A. Maruthakasi	solo
1974	Thai Pirandhal	"Maadhulai Mutthukkal Malligai"	M. S. Viswanathan	Alangudi Somu	B. Vasantha
	Thai Pirandhal	"Muruga Enakkoru Varam"	M. S. Viswanathan	Alangudi Somu	
1975	Eduppar Kai Pillai	"Kanna Perumaan"	M. B. Sreenivasan		solo
1975	Eduppar Kai Pillai	"Vanavaasam"	M. B. Sreenivasan		solo
1975	Ippadiyum Oru Penn	"En Vaazhkai Un Paniye"	P. Bhanumathi	Kannadasan	solo
1975	Ippadiyum Oru Penn	"Maanasa Sancharare"	P. Bhanumathi	Sadasiva Brahmendra	solo
1975	Ippadiyum Oru Penn	"Sa Ri Ga Ma Paa"	P. Bhanumathi	A. Maruthakasi	solo
1975	Ippadiyum Oru Penn	"Agapatta Varaiyil"	P. Bhanumathi	Vaali	Manorama
1976	Manamaara Vazhthungal	"Aanandha Bavanam"	Shankar-Ganesh	Kannadasan	solo
1976	Manamaara Vazhthungal	"Vaasugi Maganai Yasodhai"	Shankar-Ganesh	Kannadasan	solo
1986	Kannukku Mai Ezhuthu	"Vadamalliyae"	Ilaiyaraaja	K. Kalimuthu	B. S. Sasirekha
1992	Chembaruthi	"Sembaruthi Poovu"	Ilaiyaraaja	Vaali	K. S. Chithra & Mano

Out of 46 Tamil movies she acted in, she sang in 43 movies - all except Raja Bakthi, Poovum Pottum and Kattila Thottila.

== Hindi songs ==
Year	Film	Song	Composer(s)	Lyrics	Co-singer(s)
1949	Nishaan	"Teri meri yeh kahani" "Jaiyo jaiyo sipaiya" "Morae anganame" "Maze ke din"	Rajeswara Rao, M. D. Parthasarathy and R. Vaidyanathan		
1951	Mangala	"Suno Suno Pyaare More Sajna"	M. D. Parthasarathy	Pandit Indra Chandra	solo
1951	Mangala	"Meherbaan Hoon Main Tumhari"	M. D. Parthasarathy	Pandit Indra Chandra	solo
1952	Rani	"Nazar Raseeli Qamar Lacheeli"	D. C. Dutt	J. S. Kashyap	solo
1952	Rani	"O Dekh Dekh Balamwa"	D. C. Dutt	Vishwamitra Adil	solo
1953	Chandirani	"Barbad Hu Naushad Hu"	M. S. Viswanathan, C. R. Subburaman	Vishwamitra Adil	solo
1953	Chandirani	"Kaun Aa Gaya"	M. S. Viswanathan, C. R. Subburaman	Vishwamitra Adil	solo
1953	Chandirani	"Bholi Si Naar Hu Gaati Bahar Hu"	M. S. Viswanathan, C. R. Subburaman	Vishwamitra Adil	solo
1953	Chandirani	"Khili Khili Bahar Hai"	M. S. Viswanathan, C. R. Subburaman	Vishwamitra Adil	solo
1953	Chandirani	"Maan Ja Jaan Ja Dilwale"	M. S. Viswanathan, C. R. Subburaman	Vishwamitra Adil	solo
1953	Chandirani	"Chanda Tale Muskuraye Jawaniya"	M. S. Viswanathan, C. R. Subburaman	Vishwamitra Adil	Talat Mehmood
1953	Samsheer	"Dekho Bairi Pawan Lehraane Laage"	Arun Kumar Mukherjee	Vrajendra Gaur	solo
1953	Samsheer	"Tan Mann Dole Karoon Main Kya"	Arun Kumar Mukherjee, Anupam Ghatak	Vrajendra Gaur	solo
1953	Samsheer	"Kuchh Na Kahoon, Kuchh Na Sunoon"	Anupam Ghatak	Pandit Madhur	solo

Out of six Hindi movies she acted in, she sang in five movies, except Nai Roshni.
