= P. Bhanumathi filmography =

P. Bhanumathi (1925–2005) was an actress in Telugu, Tamil and Hindi cinema. She appeared in over 100 films. The following is a complete list of her films as an actress:

== Filmography ==
=== As an actress ===
Year	Film	Role	Language
1939	Vara Vikrayam	Kalindi	Telugu
1940	Malathi Madhavam	Malathi	Telugu
1941	Bhaktimala	Radha	Telugu
1941	Dharmapatni	Uma	Telugu
1943	Garuda Garvabhangam		Telugu
1943	Krishna Prema	Chandravali	Telugu
1944	Tahsildaar	Kamala	Telugu
1945	Swarga Seema	Subbi/Sujatha Devi	Telugu
1946	Gruha Pravesam	Janaki	Telugu
1947	Ratnamala	Ratnamala	Telugu
1948	Raja Mukthi	Kannika	Tamil
1949	Apoorva Sagodharargal	Kanchana	Tamil
1949	Nishaan	Ranchana	Hindi
1949	Devamanohari		Tamil
1949	Laila Majnu	Laila	Telugu
1949	Nallathambi	Pushpa	Tamil
1949	Raksha Rekha	Princess Kalavathi	Telugu
1949	Rathnakumar	Malathi	Tamil
1950	Apoorva Sahodaralu	kanchana	Telugu
1951	Malleeswari	Malleeswari	Telugu
1951	Mangala (film)	Mangala	Telugu
1951	Mangala (film)	Mangala	Hindi
1952	Prema	Mothi	Telugu
1952	Kaadhal	Mothi	Tamil
1952	Rani	Rani/Ranjani	Tamil
1952	Rani	Rani/Ranjani	Hindi
1953	Chandirani	Champa & Chandi (dual role)	Tamil
1953	Chandirani	Champa & Chandi (dual role)	Telugu
1953	Chandirani	Champa & Chandi (dual role)	Hindi
1953	Samsheer	Rupam	Hindi
1954	Aggi Ramudu	Saradha	Telugu
1954	Malaikkallan	Poonkothai	Tamil
1954	Chakrapani	Malati	Telugu
1954	Vipranarayana	Devadevi	Telugu
1955	Kalvanin Kadhali	Kalyani	Tamil
1956	Alibabavum Narpadhu Thirudargalum	Marziyana	Tamil
1956	Chintamani	Chintamani	Telugu
1956	Madurai Veeran	Princess Bommi	Tamil
1956	Rangoon Radha	Rangam	Tamil
1956	Tenali Ramakrishna	Rangasaani	Telugu
1956	Tenali Raman	Krishnasani	Tamil
1956	Sadhaaram	Sadharam	Tamil
1956	Thaaikkuppin Thaaram	Sivakami	Tamil
1956	Rambaiyin Kaadhal	Ramba	Tamil
1957	Makkalai Petra Magarasi	Rangamma	Tamil
1957	Manamagan Thevai	Bhanumathi/Chandramathi	Tamil
1957	Varudu Kavali	Bhanumathi/Chandramathi	Telugu
1957	Rani Lalithangi	Lalithangi	Tamil
1957	Ambikapathy	Princess Amaravati	Tamil
1957	Nala Damayanthi	Dhamayanthi	Telugu
1957	Nala Damayanthi	Dhamayanthi	Kannada
1957	Sarangadhara	Chitrangi Devi	Telugu
1958	Sarangadhara	Chitrangi Devi	Tamil
1958	Nadodi Mannan	Madhana	Tamil
1959	Manimekalai	Manimekalai	Tamil
1960	Raja Bakthi	Madharasai	Tamil
1960	Raja Desingu	Ranibhai	Tamil
1961	Batasari	Madhavi	Telugu
1961	Kaanal Neer	Madhavi	Tamil
1962	Annai	Savithri	Tamil
1963	Kalai Arasi	Vani & Valli (dual role)	Tamil
1963	Anuragam	Durga	Telugu
1963	Arivaali	Manorama	Tamil
1963	Kaanchi Thalaivan	Chola Kumari	Tamil
1964	Bobbili Yudham	Mallamma	Telugu
1964	Vivaha Bandham	Bharati	Telugu
1965	Antastulu	Rani	Telugu
1965	Thodu Needa	Lakshmi	Telugu
1965	Sarasa B.A.	Sarasa	Tamil
1966	Palnati Yuddham	Nagamma	Telugu
1967	Gruhalakshmi	Laxmi	Telugu
1967	Pattathu Rani	Rani	Tamil
1967	Nai Roshni	Padma Kumar	Hindi
1967	Punyavathi	Padmavathi	Telugu
1968	Poovum Pottum	Padmavathi	Tamil
1971	Mattilo Manikyam	Lalitha	Telugu
1972	Anta Mana Manchike	Savitri	Telugu
1973	Kattila Thottila	Dr. Meenakshi	Tamil
1973	Vichitra Vivaham		Telugu
1974	Ammayi Pelli	Dr. Meenakshi	Telugu
1974	Tatamma Kala	Ravamma	Telugu
1974	Mangalya Bhagyam	Kalyani	Telugu
1974	Pathu Madha Bandham	Kalyani	Tamil
1974	Swathi Nakshathram	Mother Superior	Tamil
1974	Thai Pirandhal		Tamil
1975	Ippadiyum Oru Penn	Savitri	Tamil
1975	Eduppar Kai Pillai	Indira	Tamil
1976	Manamaara Vazhthungal		Tamil
1977	Manavadi Kosam		Telugu
1979	Rachayethri	Gayathri Devi	Telugu
1981	Gadasari Atta Sogasari Kodalu	Tripurasundari aka Sundaramma	Telugu
1984	Mangamma Gari Manavadu	Mangamma	Telugu
1986	Muddula Manavaraalu	Shanthamma	Telugu
1986	Kannukku Mai Ezhuthu		Tamil
1987	Attagaru Zindabad	Rajeshwari	Telugu
1987	Mandaladeesudu		Telugu
1988	Attagaru Swagatham	Mallamma	Telugu
1988	Annapurnamma Gari Alludu		
1989	Atha Mechina Alludu	Lalithamma	Telugu
1989	Bamma Maata Bangaru Baata	Rajyalakshmamma	Telugu
1990	Abhisarika	Rajarajeshwari	Telugu
1992	Peddarikam	Adusumilli Basavapunnamma	Telugu
1992	Samrat Ashok		Telugu
1992	Chembaruthi	Bhuvaneswari	Tamil
1993	Asadhyuralu / Periyamma	Bharathi	Telugu / Tamil
1998	Pelli Kanuka	Savithramma	Telugu

=== Dubbing for films ===
Year	Film	Language
1959	Nala Damayanthi	Tamil
1976	Lawyer Indira Devi	Telugu

=== Playback singer ===
Bhanumathi gave her voice for herself and sang many songs.

Year	Film	Songs
1941	Dharma Patni	Anuraagam Leka Anandamunda; Nilu Niluma Neelavarnaa
1945	Swarga Seema	Oho Ho Pavurama, Oho Tapodhana
1949	Laila Majnu	Preme Neramouna Maapai Ee Pagela
1951	Malliswari	Manasuna Mallera Maalaloogene; Parugulu Teeyali O Gittalu Urakalu Veyali (with Ghantasala); Pilachina Biguvatara Auraura; Eda Thanunnado Baava (with Ghantasala)
1952	Prema	Divya Premaku Satiaune (with Ghantasala)
1953	Chandirani	Eeroju Bhale Roju Ide Prema Idena; Enduko Teliyani Ennadu Anukoni Ee Sambaraalemiti; Evaraalakinturu Naamora Enaleni Vedana; Kilaa Kilaa Navvulaa Kurisene Vennelaa; O Taraka (with Ghantasala)
1954	Chakrapani	Pakkala Nilabadi Kolichemu; Uyyala Jampalaloogaravaya; O Malathi Lata; Mella Mellaga
1954	Vipra Narayana	Raa Raa Naa Swamy
1956	Tenali Ramakrishna	Kannulu Ninde Kannela Vinna Mannanaleera Raja; Teerani Naa Korikale Teerenu Ee Roju
1956	Tenali Raman	Kangalil Adidum Penmaiyin Naadagam; Kannamirandum Minnidum Annam; Pirandha Naal Mannan Pirandha Naal; Vinnulagil Minni Varum Thaaragaiye Po Po
1961	Batasari	Oh Baatasaari Nanu Maruvakoyi
1963	Anuragam	Sannajaji Teeveloi Sampenga Poovuloi
1964	Bobbili Yuddham	Srikara Karunalavala Venugopala
1964	Vivaha Bandham	Vinnava Vinnava Manasulona Dagivunna Madhurageeti
1965	Antastulu	Dulapara Bulloda Dummu Dulapara Bulloda; Vinara Vissanna Ne Vedam Cheputa Vinaranna
1965	Thodu Needa	Enno Ratrulu Vastayi Kaani Idiye Toli Reyi; When I was just a little girl — I asked my mother what will I be
1967	Gruhalakshmi	Laali Laali Gopala Bala Laali Laali; Melukovayya Kaveti Ranga Sriranga
1971	Mattilo Manikyam	Saranam Nee Divya Charanam
1973	Vichitra Vivaham	Ammayilu Abbayilu Naa Matalo Nijam Vintara Meeru
1974	Ammayi Pelli	Vandanamu Raghunandana Sethu Bandhana Bhakta Chandana
1984	Mangamma Gari Manavadu	Sree Suryanarayana Meluko (with Vani Jayaram)
1986	Kannukku Mai Ezhuthu	Vaadaa Malliye Naan Sooda Mullaiye
1990	Bamma Maata Bangaru Baata	Dilli Ki Raja Aina Bamma Maata Bangaru Baata

=== Producer ===
She produced films under Bharani Pictures.

Year	Film
1949	Laila Majnu
1952	Prema
1954	Chakrapani
1954	Vipra Narayana
1961	Batasari
1948	Ratnamala

=== Director ===
Year	Film	Language
1953	Chandirani	Telugu, Tamil, Hindi
1975	Ippadiyum Oru Penn	Tamil
1982	Bhaktha Dhruva Markandeya	Telugu
1993	Asadhyuralu / Periyamma	Telugu, Tamil

=== Music director ===
Year	Film	Language
1954	Chakrapani	Telugu
1975	Ippadiyum Oru Penn	Tamil
