= Bharani Pictures =

Bharani Pictures is a film production company in Chennai, India. It was established by P. S. Ramakrishna Rao and Bhanumathi Ramakrishna in 1947. They later established Bharani Studios in 1950. It is named after their son Bharani. Dr. Bharani Paluvai, who is presently taking care of the studios and established Bharani Hospitals in the compound. Bharani Function Hall opened April 2016 by Dr. Meenakshi Paluvai, Dr. Bharani's daughter.

Their first film Chandirani (1953), which was made in Tamil, Telugu, and Hindi languages and simultaneous released all over India.

Year	Film	Language	Music	Ref
1948	Ratnamala	Telugu	C. R. Subburaman	
1949	Laila Majnu	Tamil	C. R. Subburaman	
1949	Laila Majnu	Telugu	C. R. Subburaman	
1952	Prema	Telugu	C. R. Subburaman	
1952	Kaadhal	Tamil	C. R. Subburaman	
1953	Chandirani	Telugu	C. R. Subburaman	
1953	Chandirani	Tamil	C. R. Subburaman	
1953	Chandirani	Hindi	C. R. Subburaman	
1954	Chakrapani	Telugu	P. Bhanumathi	
1954	Vipra Narayana	Tamil	S. Rajeswara Rao	
1954	Vipra Narayana	Telugu	S. Rajeswara Rao	
1956	Chintamani	Telugu	Addepalli Rama Rao	
1957	Manamagan Thevai	Tamil	G. Ramanathan	
1957	Varudu Kavali	Telugu	G. Ramanathan	
1961	Batasari	Telugu	Master Venu	
1961	Kaanal Neer	Tamil	Master Venu	
1964	Vivaha Bandham	Telugu	P. Bhanumathi	
1967	Gruhalakshmi	Telugu	S. Rajeswara Rao	
1972	Anta Mana Manchike	Telugu	P. Bhanumathi	
1974	Ammayi Pelli	Telugu	P. Bhanumathi	
1977	Manavadi Kosam	Telugu	P. Bhanumathi	
1984	Rachayithri	Telugu	P. Bhanumathi	
1987	Attagaru Zindabad	Telugu	P. Bhanumathi	
