= Tellapadu =

- village
- Interactive map of Tellapadu
- Location in Andhra Pradesh, India Tellapadu (India)
- Coordinates: 15.66167°N 79.94833°E
- Country: India
- State: Andhra Pradesh
- District: Prakasam
- Elevation: 29 m (95 ft)

Languages
  - Official: Telugu
- Time zone: UTC+5:30 (IST)
- PIN: 523263
- Telephone code: 8593
- Lok Sabha constituency: Bapatla (SC)
- AP Assembly constituency: Santhanuthalapadu (SC)

Tellapadu (pronounced "Tellabadu") is a village of Doddavaram Panchayathi in Maddipadu Mandal of Prakasam District in the southern Indian state of Andhra Pradesh.

It is a part of Bapatla (SC) Parliamentary constituency and Santhanuthalapadu (SC) assembly constituency. It was previously a part of the Addanki Assembly constituency constituency.

== Geography ==
The approximate location of Tellapadu is 15.662°N 79.949°E. It lies to the South-South West of the reservoir of the River Gundlakamma.

== Public Institutions ==
Tellapadu has a Zilla Parishad High School named after Paruchuri Narasimhaiah, and a sub-post office. The school's golden jubilee celebrations were celebrated on 21 April 2013, and was well covered by Telugu media.

== Notable people ==
Several landlords, eminent industrialists, senior public/private sector employees hail from here including:

1) (Late) Mallipeddi Venkatasubbaiah & Ramaswamy Chowdary, and later the former's sons, in their prime, were the richest people/zamindars of the village. Their residence measuring around 45,000 square feet (4,200 m^{2}) and shed (for cattle and horses), housed several peacocks, horses, cattle etc. Such was their wealth that people used to fight to stake claim to their cattle's dung, whence they were passing through the village. A bust of (Late) Mallipeddi Pitchaiah was unveiled during the recent high school golden jubilee celebrations for his benevolent contribution of 6 acres of land towards the school.

2) (Late) Velagapudi Ramakrishna(founder KCP group, former ICS officer). Tellapadu was the birthplace of his father (original surname: Katragadda) who was then adopted by close relatives in Bellamvaripalem, near Repalle (Guntur district), Andhra Pradesh, India.

3) (Late) Panda Punnaiah (whose mother hails from here) was chairman, Beardsell Ltd. and also on the boards of Nava Bharat Ventures Ltd. (formerly Nava Bharat Ferro Alloys) and Prakasam Sugar Complex Ltd.

4) (Late) Yanamadala Ramakrishnayya had been President for more than 25 years and played an important role in the development of two villages. He fought with the government for the people and built homes for the poor and backward caste people. In his memory they named their colony as Ramakrishna Puram

== Composition ==
The village also includes a large number of migrants from the former Repalle Taluk in Guntur district. The caste composition of the main village is mainly by members of the Kamma caste, all Pedda Kammas, a large chunk of whom have migrated to urban areas (particularly Hyderabad, Bangalore, Guntur and the US). Other castes include Brahmins and Vaishyas; professional castes like washermen, barbers, milkmen; dalits and others. The latter two-thirds have their own quarters towards the village's boundary.
