= Veeramachaneni =

Veeramachaneni (వీరమాచనేని) is a Telugu surname:

- Veeramachaneni Babu Rajendra Prasad, an Indian film producer and director
- Veeramachaneni Jagapati Rao Chowdary, an Indian film actor
- Veeramachineni Madhusudhan Rao, an Indian film director
- Veeramachaneni Ramakrishna, an Indian chartered accountant from Vijayawada and creator of the "Veeramachaneni Diet Plan"
