= Doddavaram =

- village
- Interactive map of Doddavaram
- Location in Andhra Pradesh, India Doddavaram (India)
- Coordinates: 15.66667°N 79.93944°E
- Country: India
- State: Andhra Pradesh
- District: Prakasam
- Elevation: 32 m (105 ft)

Languages
  - Official: Telugu
- Time zone: UTC+5:30 (IST)
- PIN: 523263
- Telephone code: 8593
- Vehicle registration: AP
- Lok Sabha constituency: Bapatla
- Vidhan Sabha constituency: Santhanuthalapadu

Doddavaram is located in the Maddipadu Mandal of Prakasam District in Andhra Pradesh, India. It is said that this village was known as Veera Narasimha Puri Agraharam during the reign of Addanki rulers.

== See also ==
- Tellapadu
