= Chakrapani (film) =

- Theatrical release poster
- Directed by: P. S. Ramakrishna Rao
- Written by: Ravuri Satyanarayana Rao
- Story by: Venkata Satyanarayana Rao Ravuru
- Produced by: P. S. Ramakrishna Rao; Bhanumathi (Presents)
- Starring: Akkineni Nageswara Rao
- Cinematography: P. S. Selvaraj
- Edited by: P. S. Ramakrishna Rao
- Music by: Bhanumathi Ramakrishna
- Production company: Bharani Studios
- Release date: 19 March 1954
- Running time: 147 mins
- Country: India
- Language: Telugu

Chakrapani is a 1954 Indian Telugu-language comedy film, produced and directed by P. S. Ramakrishna Rao under the Bharani Pictures banner. It stars Bhanumathi and Akkineni Nageswara Rao with music composed and songs sung by Bhanumathi.

== Plot ==
The film begins with a substantial rich miser Chakrapani aiming to accumulate 1 lakh to bestow to his great-grandson. After his son's death, he ensured his daughter-in-law Visalakshamma, grandson Jagannadham, and 3 granddaughters Santha, Malati, & Revati. Among them, Malati is the naughtiest and plays pranks on her grandfather, taking digs at his miserly ways. She instigates her brother to pick up a row with the older adult, which leads to Jagannath's exit. To spend less expenses on his granddaughters' weddings, Chakrapani gets a widower, Ananda Rao, for Santha and a dumb fellow for Malati. Then, grudgingly, Malati absconds while the meek Santha weds Ananda Rao. Malati becomes acquainted with and offered shelter by a considerate couple, Mukunda Rao and Usha.

Meanwhile, Venkatachalam, the younger of Usha, falls in love with her, and they espouse. Later, Mukunda Rao is transferred when Malati lets a portion to a tactical lady named Manorama. Venkatachalam joined an insurance company, which made him a frequent traveler. Anyhow, Chakrapani reaches his target when Revati notifies Malati that Santha is pregnant and has given birth to a baby girl. According to the guidance of Manorama, Malati counterfeits her grandfather's belief that she has delivered a boy.

Ergo, Chakrapani arrives when Manorama heirs a child from the neighbors. To bring authenticity, Manorama's brother Saradhi is forged as Malati's husband since Chalam is on tour. In the interim, Chalam returns and is introduced as the cook. From there, the story takes several comic twists. Ultimately, Chakrapani is elated that his wealth is going to the rightful heir- his great-grandson, who is the estranged Jagannatham's son. Finally, Jagannadham declares that women have equal property rights, and he shares the amount with his sisters.

== Cast ==
- Bhanumathi Ramakrishna as Malati
- Akkineni Nageswara Rao as Venkatachalam
- C. S. R as Chakrapani
- Ramana Reddy as Ananda Rao
- Amarnath as Saradhi
- Dr. Sivaramakrishnayya as Mukunda Rao
- Chandrasekhar as Jagannadham
- Vangara as Kotayya
- Allu Ramalingaiah as Priest
- Suryakantham as Manorama
- Chayadevi as Usha
- T. G. Kamala Devi as Shantha

== Soundtrack ==
Chakrapani

Film score by Bhanumathi Ramakrishna
- Released: 1954
- Genre: Soundtrack
- Length: 16:29
- Label: His Master's Voice
- Producer: Bhanumathi Ramakrishna

Music was composed by Bhanumathi. Lyrics were written by Ravuri Satyanarayana Rao. Music released on His Master's Voice

S. No.	Song title	Singers	length
1	"O Priyurala"	A. M. Rajah	3:09
2	"Uyyala Jampalala"	Bhanumathi Ramakrishna	3:50
3	"Pakkala Nilabadi"	Bhanumathi Ramakrishna	3:11
4	"Mella Mellagaa"	Bhanumathi Ramakrishna	3:03
5	"O Malathi Lata"	Bhanumathi Ramakrishna	3:16

== Production ==
A popular writer of the time, Ravuru had started his career with Krishnapatrika in Machilipatnam and later worked in the editorial section of Andhra Prabha. His column Ashamaashi, in which he wrote on serious subjects in a lighter vein, was very popular in those days. He came up with the story of Chakrapani, a penny-pincher, and his naughty granddaughter. This film was a satire on Tollywood veteran producer Chakrapani. Due to her rift with Chakrapani, Bhanumathi had left the lead role in the movie Missamma and later that role went to Savitri. By that time she was in the making of the film Vipranarayana (1954), in which ANR and Bhanumathi are playing lead roles. She postponed the shooting of Vipranarayana and began to work on this film and wanted to release the film before the release of Missamma. It is the debut movie of Bhanumathi as Music Director.

== Critical reception ==
An article published in The Hindu newspaper on the movie reviewed: " The entire narrative in the movie is full of wit, thanks to Ravuru's humorous dialogue and the fine performance by all major actors – ANR, Bhanumathi, CSR, Kamaladevi, Amarnath, Ramana Reddy, Suryakantham and others. As usual, Bhanumathi dominated the proceedings and came up with a career-best hilarious show, sustaining with ease the tempo throughout. ANR matched her with his comic timing and expressions. Apart from performances, excellent cinematography by P. S. Selvaraj, the musical score by Bhanumathi helped the film's box-office success. Her renditions – "Uyyala Jampalalooga Raavaya…," "Pakkala Nilabadi…," "Nanu Choosi Intha Jaali Yelanamma," and A. M. Raja's "O Priyuraala… O Jawaraala" needs mention. Addepalli Ramarao and the popular violinist of the time, Hari Achyutharama Sastry, provided the background score that enhanced the film's quality."

== Legacy ==
When Bhanumathi reworked the story and made it as Athagaru Zindabad (director: P. Chandrasekhar Reddy) in 1988 as a tribute to her husband, her attempt did not meet with similar success.
