= Eduppar Kai Pillai =

- Poster
- Directed by: K. Vijayan
- Written by: Thooyavan
- Produced by: M. Muthuraman; B. Durai; Brindha
- Starring: P. Bhanumathi; Jaishankar; Vennira Aadai Nirmala; Kumari Manjula
- Cinematography: R. Venkat
- Edited by: R. Devarajan
- Music by: M. B. Sreenivasan
- Production company: Sakthi Cine Arts
- Release date: 19 September 1975
- Country: India
- Language: Tamil

Eduppar Kai Pillai (Tamil pronunciation: [eɖupːaːɾ kaɪpːiɭːaɪ] transl. Simpleton) is a 1975 Indian Tamil-language film directed by K. Vijayan and written by Thooyavan. The film stars P. Bhanumathi, Jaishankar, Vennira Aadai Nirmala and Kumari Manjula. It was released on 19 September 1975.

== Cast ==
- P. Bhanumathi as Indira
- Jaishankar as Mohan
- Vennira Aadai Nirmala as Vasantha
- Kumari Manjula as Rani
- M. R. R. Vasu as Rajalingam
- Major Sundarrajan
- Srikanth as Madan
- Suruli Rajan
- Manorama
- Faryal (guest appearance)
- Neelu
- T. K. Ramachandran

== Production ==
The film was nearing completion by late July 1975, with major scenes having been filmed in Bangalore and Mysore.

== Soundtrack ==
The music was composed by M. B. Sreenivasan, with lyrics by Kannadasan.

Track listing
No.	Title	Singer(s)	Length
1.	"Kiss Me Son"	P. Bhanumathi
2.	"Azhagu Rani"	P. Susheela
3.	"Ponn Mayangum"	K. J. Yesudas, P. Susheela
4.	"Meet My Son"	P. Bhanumathi

== Release and reception ==
Eduppar Kai Pillai was released on 19 September 1975. Kanthan of Kalki appreciated the performances of Bhanumathi, M. R. R. Vasu and Vennira Aadai Nirmala, while also praising the humour of Manorama and Surulirajan, Thooyavan's story and dialogues, Vijayan's direction and Venkat's cinematography. However, he expressed misgivings about the appropriateness of the film's title. The film was unsuccessful, although it did serve as an inspiration for Sattam En Kaiyil (1978).
