= Ratnamala (film) =

- Theatrical release poster
- Directed by: P. S. Ramakrishna Rao
- Written by: Samudrala Sr (dialogues)
- Screenplay by: P. S. Ramakrishna Rao
- Produced by: P. S. Ramakrishna Rao; Bhanumathi (Presents)
- Starring: Bhanumathi Ramakrishna; Akkineni Nageswara Rao
- Cinematography: P. S. Selvaraj
- Edited by: V. S. Narayanan
- Music by: C. R. Subburaman
- Production company: Bharani Pictures
- Release date: 2 January 1948
- Country: India
- Language: Telugu

Ratnamala is a 1948 Telugu-language film, produced and directed by P. S. Ramakrishna Rao under the Bharani Studios banner. It stars Bhanumathi Ramakrishna and Akkineni Nageswara Rao, with music composed by C. R. Subburaman.

== Cast ==
- Bhanumathi as Ratnamala
- Akkineni Nageswara Rao as Chandrakanth
- Govindarajula Subba Rao as Simhakethu
- C. S. R. as Dhoomakethu
- Suryanarayana as Chandrakanth
- Aarani Satyanarayana
- Nyapati Raghava Rao as Lord Siva
- Sitaram
- Hemalatha
- Baby Sumithra

== Crew ==
Ratnamala advertisement in 1948 issue of Chandamama magazine.

- Art: D. S. Godgaonkar
- Choreography: Vedantam Raghavayya
- Dialogues - Lyrics: Samudrala Sr
- Playback: Ghantasala, Bhanumathi Ramakrishna, K. Jamuna Rani, C.S.R., Baby Sarojini
- Music: C. R. Subburaman
- Editing: V. S. Narayanan
- Cinematography: P. S. Selvaraj
- Presenter: Bhanumathi Ramakrishna
- Producer - Screenplay - Director: P. S. Ramakrishna Rao
- Banner: Bharani Pictures
- Release Date: 2 January 1948

== Soundtrack ==
Ratnamala

Film score by C. R. Subburaman
- Released: 1948
- Genre: Soundtrack
- Length: 12:55
- Producer: C. R. Subburaman

Music composed by C. R. Subburaman. Lyrics were written by Samudrala Sr.

S. No.	Song title	Singers	length
1	"Aagave Maradala"	C.S.R	1:59
2	"Anandadayini"	Bhanumathi Ramakrishna	2:20
3	"Madana"	Bhanumathi Ramakrishna	2:23
4	"O Randagada"	Ghantasala	2:01
5	"Vagalaadi"	K. Jamuna Rani	1:50
6	"Poyiraa"	Chorus	2:22

== Trivia ==
The film was the debut of Bharani Pictures in the film industry and the debut movie for P. S. Ramakrishna Rao as director.
