= Kannukku Mai Ezhuthu =

1986 film by Mahendran

- Theatrical release poster
- Directed by: Mahendran
- Written by: Mahendran
- Starring: Bhanumathi; Sujatha
- Cinematography: V. Selvaraj
- Edited by: B. Lenin
- Music by: Ilaiyaraaja
- Production company: Blue Moon Pictures
- Release date: 1 November 1986
- Country: India
- Language: Tamil

Kannukku Mai Ezhuthu (transl. Put kohl around the eye) is a 1986 Indian Tamil-language film written and directed by Mahendran, starring Bhanumathi and Sujatha. It was released on 1 November 1986.

== Cast ==
- Bhanumathi
- Sujatha
- Sarath Babu
- Vadivukkarasi

== Production ==
This was produced by K. L. Bose who earlier produced films like Unarchigal and Unmaigal. The film was both launched and filming was held at a bungalow in Nungambakkam. The last schedule of filming was held at six various bungalows including the home of actress Vijayakumari and Golden Beach. The song "Thambala Sundariye" featuring Chandrasekhar and Disco Shanti was shot at Golden Beach.

== Soundtrack ==
The music was composed by Ilaiyaraaja. ADMK politician K. Kalimuthu wrote lyrics for most of the songs.

Track listing
No.	Title	Lyrics	Singer(s)	Length
1.	"Anbu Malargalin"	K. Kalimuthu	S. Janaki	4:33
2.	"Shogangal"	K. Kalimuthu	Ilaiyaraaja	2:19
3.	"Thambala Sundariyae"	K. Kalimuthu	Malaysia Vasudevan, S. P. Sailaja Vijayaramani, Saibaba	4:45
4.	"Vadamalliyae"	K. Kalimuthu	Bhanumathi, B. S. Sasirekha	4:34
5.	"Vanna Poove"	Gangai Amaran	Ilaiyaraaja	2:45
Total length:				18:56

== Release and reception ==
Kannukku Mai Ezhuthu was released on 1 November 1986. N. Krishnaswamy of The Indian Express called the film an "exaggeratedly self-indulgent and self-pitying exercise in filmmaking". Jayamanmadhan of Kalki wrote that the camera and music is not bad but Mahendran goes around by which patience is lost. Balumani of Anna praised acting, cinematography, music and direction though he felt the scenes are too slow and lengthy. The film failed at the box-office.

== Bibliography ==
- Mahendran (2013) [2004]. சினிமாவும் நானும் [Cinema and I] (in Tamil). Karpagam Publications. OCLC 54777094.
