= Chintamani (1956 film) =

- Theatrical release poster
- Directed by: P. S. Ramakrishna Rao
- Screenplay by: P. S. Ramakrishna Rao
- Based on: Chintamani by Kallakuri Narayana Rao
- Produced by: P. S. Ramakrishna Rao
- Starring: P. Bhanumathi; N. T. Rama Rao; Jamuna
- Cinematography: Sridhar
- Edited by: P. S. Ramakrishna Rao
- Music by: Addepalli Rama Rao; T. V. Raju
- Production company: Bharani Studios
- Release date: 11 April 1956
- Running time: 148 minutes
- Country: India
- Language: Telugu

Chintamani is a 1956 Indian Telugu-language drama film produced and directed by P. S. Ramakrishna Rao. It stars P. Bhanumathi, N. T. Rama Rao and Jamuna, with music composed by Addepalli Rama Rao and T. V. Raju. The film is based on the play of the same name, written by Kallakuri Narayana Rao. It was a flop at the box office.

== Plot ==
The film follows the story of Chintamani, a courtesan who, despite being a devotee of Krishna, is coerced by her greedy mother, Srihari, into luring and robbing the wealth of Bhavani Sankarudu, a Brahmin, and Subbi Setti, a merchant. Bilvamangaludu, the son of Vasudeva Murthy, a gold merchant, lives a happy life with his devoted wife, Radha. Bilvamangaludu becomes infatuated with Chintamani, and although Vasudeva Murthy warns Bilvamangaludu, his son ignores the advice, leading to his father’s illness and eventual death. Bilvamangaludu’s obsession with Chintamani grows, and he disregards his father’s death on a stormy night. He climbs the compound with what he believes is a crupper but is actually a snake.

Chintamani, noticing his bloodied clothes, questions Bilvamangaludu, who confesses his actions. She chastises him, and he collapses in repentance, realizing the corpse he carried was Radha’s. Krishna then enlightens Chintamani, and she decides to give away her wealth to the village. After Radha’s funeral, Bilvamangaludu blinds himself as an act of repentance and becomes a devoted follower of Krishna, eventually residing in an ashram. Chintamani also joins the ashram.

Krishna decides to grant salvation to both Chintamani and Bilvamangaludu, a decision Rukmini questions. To test their devotion, Krishna presents a challenge that even great saints cannot complete: detecting fragrance. Despite his blindness, Bilvamangaludu recognizes the fragrance of the Lord, regaining his vision in the process. The film concludes with Krishna granting salvation to both Chintamani and Bilvamangaludu.

== Cast ==
- P. Bhanumathi as Chintamani
- N. T. Rama Rao as Bilvamangaludu
- Jamuna as Radha
- S. V. Ranga Rao as Bhavani Sankarudu
- Relangi as Subbi Setti
- Raghuramaiah as Lord Krishna
- Rushyendramani as Srihari
- Chaya Devi as Mani
- Prabhavathi as Rukmini
- Leelarani as Chitra
- Mikkilineni as Bhagavantham
- Dr kamaraju
- Addala Narayana Rao
- RV Krishna Rao
- Boddapati Krishna Rao
- Venkata rathnam
- Krishna Prasad

== Production ==
Chintamani was produced by P. Bhanumathi under her production company, Bharani Pictures, and directed by her husband, P. S. Ramakrishna Rao. The film starred N. T. Rama Rao in the lead role of Bilvamangaludu, with Bhanumathi playing the title role of Chintamani.

Initially, Akkineni Nageswara Rao was considered for the role of Bilvamangaludu. However, Nageswara Rao declined the role, advising the producers to abandon the project, suggesting that Bharani Pictures was not suitable for such a film. Despite this setback, Bhanumathi and Ramakrishna chose to proceed with the project, as the script work had already been completed.

The production featured S. V. Ranga Rao as Bhavani Sankarudu and Relangi as Subbi Setti. Since Bhanumathi was playing the role of Chintamani, the filmmakers took precautions to maintain her public image by portraying the character as a devout woman, refraining from any depiction that could be seen as tarnishing her persona. As a result, the character was reimagined as a devoted follower of Lord Krishna rather than a seductive figure.

Director Ramakrishna aimed to present the film with a serious and dignified tone, deliberately avoiding light-hearted or comedic treatment. However, despite these efforts, the film did not meet the audience’s expectations. Viewers, who had anticipated a more entertaining narrative, were disappointed by the sombre tone of the film.

The film was adapted from the play Chintamani by Kallakuri Narayana Rao. However, government censorship imposed restrictions on certain scenes, particularly those between Chintamani and Subbi Setti, which were removed during the editing process. In an attempt to add more entertainment, Ramakrishna included comedic scenes between Subbi Setti and his wife, but these too were censored. Consequently, the final version of the film became a serious, devotional story, leading to its satirical rebranding as Bhakta Chintamani (transl. Devotee Chintamani) by the audience. This shift contributed to the film’s failure to meet audience expectations.

== Soundtrack ==
Chintamani

Film score by Addepalli Rama Rao T. V. Raju
- Released: 1956
- Producers: Addepalli Rama Rao; T. V. Raju

Music composed by Addepalli Rama Rao and T. V. Raju. Lyrics were written by Ravuru.

S. No.	Song title	Singers	length
1	Andalu Chindeti	A. M. Rajah, Bhanumathi Ramakrishna	3:21
2	Teeyani Veenalu	Bhanumathi Ramakrishna	2:40
3	Kanara Srihari	Raghuramaiah	4:49
4	Taguna Nanu	P. Leela	3:25
5	Melaye Neevela	Bhanumathi Ramakrishna	4:12
6	Rangaina Ravvnura	P. Susheela	4:09
7	Jaya Jaya Sundara	Ghantasala, Bhanumathi Ramakrishna	1:19
8	Inta Rambhalavanti	Madhavapeddi Satyam	1:02
9	Intulu Tarasilluvarake	Bhanumathi Ramakrishna	1:04
10	Enta Dayo	Relangi	0:20
11	Kaligin Bhagyamunellanu	Madhavapeddi Satyam	0:49
12	Kani Rojulu	Relangi	2:43
13	Tapasa Vruttibooni	Raghuramaiah	1:18
14	Tatalanati Kshetramulella	Madhavapeddi Satyam	1:18
15	Tani Yadhanudu	P. Leela	0:35
16	Naluvura Nota	Madhavapeddi Satyam	0:53
17	Nallni Menutoda	Bhanumathi Ramakrishna	0:58
18	Nanu Devendruniga	Madhavapeddi Satyam	0:53
19	Pasidi Seelammunammina	Raghumaiah	1:44
20	Papini Brasthurala	Bhanumathi Ramakrishna	0:48
21	Pujyulaintanu Puttina	Raghumaiah	2:07
22	Bhakti Bhavammu	Raghumaiah	1:14
23	Mounul Satatmu	Bhanumathi Ramakrishna	0:52
24	Vidichiti Bandhuvargamula	Madhavapeddi Satyam	0:55
25	Sirikin Cheppadu	P. Susheela	0:54
26	Haindava Sundari	P. Susheela	0:56
27	Kastabharitambu	Ghantasala	0:52
28	Kalindi	Ghantasala	0:53
29	Chuchinavelayettidiyo	Ghantasala	0:59
30	Ardhanga	Ghantasala	1:23
32	Chadiviti	Ghantasala	0:29
33	Taalimi	Ghantasala	0:37
34	Talliro	Ghantasala	0:30
35	Kasturi Thilakam	Ghantasala	0:59
