= P. S. Ramakrishna Rao =

Indian film director (1918–1986)

- Born: 12 October 1918
- Died: 7 September 1986 (aged 67) United States of America
- Occupations: Film director Producer
- Spouse: P. Bhanumathi
- Children: Bharani

P. S. Ramakrishna Rao (12 October 1918 – 7 September 1986) was an Indian film director and producer, primarily known for his work in Telugu and Tamil cinema. He married Bhanumathi, a multi-talented film artist from South India, on 8 August 1943.

== Personal life ==
During the shooting of the film Krishna Prema (1943), Bhanumathi met P. S. Ramakrishna Rao, an assistant director of that film. She was impressed by his work ethics and fell in love with him. Bhanumathi married him against her parents' wishes. The couple married on 8 August 1943 and have one son, Bharani. Before marriage the first condition he put forth was that she quit acting; Bhanumathi happily agreed and did so. However, when B.N. Reddy convinced P. S. Ramakrishna Rao, he agreed to let her act. They were one of the most happily married couples from Indian cinema industry. He was a film producer, director and editor of Telugu and Tamil Films. Later they launched a popular production company, "Bharani Pictures" and "Bharani Studio" in their son's name. Bhanumathi proudly stated that whatever she was today was because of her husband.

=== Death ===
He died at his son's residence in US. MGR helped bring his body to India.

== Filmography ==
- Ratnamala (1947) (Producer and Director)
- Laila Majnu (1949) (Producer and Director)
- Kaadhal (Producer and Director)
- Prema (1952) (Producer and Director)
- Chandirani (1953) (Producer)
- Bratuku Theruvu (1953) (Director)
- Chakrapani (1954) (Producer and Director)
- Vipranarayana (1954) (Producer and Director)
- Chintamani (1956) (Producer and Director)
- Manamagan Thevai (1957) (Director)
- Varudu Kaavaali (1957) (Producer and Director)
- Sabhash Raja (1961) (Director)
- Kaanal Neer (1961) (Director)
- Batasari (1961) (Producer and Director)
- Aatma Bandhuvu (1962) (Director)
- Anubandhalu (1963) (Director)
- Vivaha Bandham (1964) (Producer and Director)
- Gruhalakshmi (1967) (Producer, Director and Writer)
