= Ippadiyum Oru Penn =

- Theatrical release poster
- Directed by: Bhanumathi Ramakrishna
- Written by: Bhanumathi Ramakrishna
- Dialogue by: Aaroor Dass
- Produced by: Bhanumathi Ramakrishna
- Starring: Bhanumathi Ramakrishna; Sivakumar; Devika
- Music by: Bhanumathi Ramakrishna
- Production company: Bharani Pictures
- Release date: 1 May 1975
- Country: India
- Language: Tamil

Ippadiyum Oru Penn (transl. A woman like this) is a 1975 Indian Tamil-language film produced, directed and written by Bhanumathi Ramakrishna of Bharani Pictures. The film stars Bhanumathi herself, Sivakumar and Devika. It was released on 1 May 1975.

== Cast ==
- Bhanumathi Ramakrishna as Savitri
- Sivakumar
- Devika
- Srikanth
- Kumari Padmini
- Thengai Srinivasan
- Manorama

== Production ==
Bhanumathi Ramakrishna, in addition to writing, directing and producing, also played the lead role. The dialogues were written by Aaroor Dass.

== Soundtrack ==
The soundtrack was composed by Bhanumathi Ramakrishna. It features a version of "Manasa Sancharare", composed by Sadasiva Brahmendra. The song "Naane Radhai Kanna" is set in the Carnatic raga Hindolam.

Track listing
No.	Title	Lyrics	Singer(s)	Length
1.	"En Vaazhkai Un Paniye"	Kannadasan	Bhanumathi Ramakrishna
2.	"Maanasa Sancharare"	Sadasiva Brahmendra	Bhanumathi Ramakrishna
3.	"Sa Ri Ga Ma Paa"	A. Maruthakasi	Bhanumathi Ramakrishna
4.	"Agapatta Varaiyil"	Vaali	Bhanumathi Ramakrishna, Manorama
5.	"Pongudhe Punnagai"	Kannadasan	S. P. Balasubrahmanyam, B. Vasantha
6.	"Naane Radhai Kanna"	A.maruthakasi	Bhanumathi Ramakrishna

== Release and reception ==
Ippadiyum Oru Penn was released on 1 May 1975. Kanthan of Kalki praised the film's music, screenplay and cast performances. Navamani noted that Bhanumati, despite multitasking with directing, writing and music composing, proved herself as versatile.
