= Sarasa B.A. =

- Theatrical release poster
- Directed by: D. Yoganand
- Screenplay by: Valampuri Somanathan
- Story by: Ganesh Films Story Department
- Produced by: Krishnamoorthy; Natarajan
- Starring: P. Bhanumathi; K. Balaji
- Cinematography: Malli Irani
- Edited by: B. Kandhaswamy
- Music by: Vedha
- Production company: Ganesh Films
- Release date: 9 July 1965
- Country: India
- Language: Tamil

Sarasa B.A. is a 1965 Indian Tamil-language film directed by D. Yoganand and written by Valampuri Somanathan. The film stars P. Bhanumathi and K. Balaji, with M. R. Radha, Nagesh and M. R. R. Vasu in supporting roles. It was released on 9 July 1965.

== Plot ==
The film centres on a woman's life and relationships, reflecting social themes typical of Tamil cinema of the 1960s.

== Cast ==
- P. Bhanumathi as Sarasa
- K. Balaji
- M. R. Radha
- Nagesh
- M. R. R. Vasu

== Soundtrack ==
The music was composed by Vedha, with lyrics by Kannadasan.

Track listing
No.	Title	Singer(s)	Length
1.	"Iravin Madiyil"	P. B. Sreenivas
2.	"Kanni Paruvam"	K. Jamuna Rani, Thiruchi Loganathan
3.	"Kannondru Naanum"	P. Bhanumathi
4.	"Manathil Manathai"	P. Bhanumathi
5.	"Naan Vizhikkum"	P. Bhanumathi

== Release and reception ==
Sarasa B.A. was released on 9 July 1965. The Indian Express called the story "topsyturvy", adding, "Bhanumati and Balaji do manage to inject some life into the drab proceedings and Malli Irani's camerawork does show enterprise in many sequences. But what can they do when everything else about the film smacks of mediocrity?". Kalki also gave the film an unfavourable review, but said Bhanumathi's performance gave the story some dignity.
