= Poovum Pottum =

- Poster
- Directed by: Dada Mirasi
- Screenplay by: Aaroor Dass
- Story by: Nihar Ranjan Gupta
- Produced by: Vasu Menon
- Starring: S. V. Ranga Rao; A. V. M. Rajan; Muthuraman; P. Bhanumathi
- Cinematography: Jakidhar
- Edited by: K. Narayanan; K. Sangunni
- Music by: R. Govardhanam
- Production company: Vasu Films
- Release date: 26 January 1968
- Running time: 165 minutes
- Country: India
- Language: Tamil

Poovum Pottum (transl. Flower and Vermilion) is a 1968 Indian Tamil-language romantic drama film directed by Dada Mirasi and produced by Vasu Menon. The film stars S. V. Ranga Rao, A. V. M. Rajan, Muthuraman and Bhanumathi. It is a remake of Bengali film Taposhi (1965). The film was released on 26 January 1968.

== Cast ==
Male cast

- S. V. Ranga Rao as Professor Raja Rathinam
- A. V. M. Rajan as Professor Prakash
- Muthuraman
- K. D. Santhanam
- Veerappan as Rickshaw puller
- Nagesh as Sukumar

Female cast

- P. Bhanumathi as Padmavathi
- Pandari Bai as Charu
- Bharathi as Amudha
- Jyothi Lakshmi as Chithra
- M. Bhanumathi as Kamala

== Soundtrack ==
Music was by R. Govardhanam and lyrics were written by A. Maruthakasi, Kannadasan and Vaali. The song "Nathaswara Osaiyile Devan" is set in Brindavani Sarang raga.

Songs	Singer	Length
"Ennam Pola Kannan Vandhan"	P. Susheela	04:06
"Un Azhagai Kandu Kondal"	P. B. Srinivas	03:37
"Nathaswara Osaiyile Devan"	T. M. Soundararajan, P. Susheela	03:49
"Muthal Embathu Thodakkam"	T. M. Soundararajan	03:27
"Ponvandu Theendatha"	L. R. Eswari	04:45
"Ulagam Olimayangum"	P. Leela	03:19
"Ellorum Kondadum Engal"	S. Janaki	03:30
Club Dance	Instrumental	03:07

== Reception ==
Kalki appreciated the film for various aspects, including the writing and cast performances.
