= Antastulu =

- Theatrical release poster
- Directed by: V. Madhusudhana Rao
- Written by: Acharya Aatreya (dialogues)
- Screenplay by: V. Madhusudhana Rao
- Story by: Javar Seetharaman
- Produced by: V. B. Rajendra Prasad
- Starring: Bhanumathi Ramakrishna; Akkineni Nageswara Rao; Krishna Kumari
- Cinematography: C. Nageshwara Rao
- Edited by: Satyam
- Music by: K. V. Mahadevan
- Production company: Jagapathi Art Productions
- Distributed by: Vani Films
- Release date: 27 May 1965
- Running time: 182 minutes
- Country: India
- Language: Telugu

Antastulu (transl. classes) is a 1965 Indian Telugu-language drama film produced by V. B. Rajendra Prasad and directed by V. Madhusudhana Rao. It stars Akkineni Nageswara Rao, Bhanumathi Ramakrishna, Krishna Kumari with music composed by K. V. Mahadevan. The film won the National Film Award for Best Feature Film in Telugu in 1965, as well as two Nandi Awards.

== Plot ==
Zamindar Raja Jagannatha Rao is affluent and obsessed with discipline. He doesn't show any preference between family members and workers; if anyone dares to break the rules, he punishes them harshly. So, his wife, Roopa Devi, and elder son, Raghu, oblige accordingly, whereas the younger son, Chinababu, finds these rules annoying. Jagannatha Rao learns about Chinababu's ideas and warns him twice, but he does not listen, so furious Jagannatha Rao seeks to punish him, and Chinababu dies out of shock. As a result, Raghu gets upset and wants to leave his father and house. Then Jagannatha Rao allows him a vast amount and asks him to live a wealthy lifestyle and understand life. Unfortunately, Raghu goes into the clutches of a malevolent person, Naagu, who turns him into a spoilt brat. After some time, Raghu tries to trap a beautiful girl, Mala, but looking at her virtue, he reforms himself and gets rid of Naagu. Meanwhile, at the palace, Jagannatha Rao breaks down mentally as his past haunts him. Upon discovering this, Raghu returns.

Before his death, Jagannatha Rao shares his past sin of deceiving a poor girl, Raaji. They had a child, Rani, who lives as a street dancer. Here, Jagannatha Rao expresses his wish to make her an equal heir without officially acknowledging her to protect the family's honor. Raghu somehow convinces Rani and brings her home, much to the disapproval of his mother, Roopa Devi. At one point, Rani discovers the truth and wants to acquire her identity. Then, she starts teasing everyone in the house. Roopa Devi orders Raghu to expel Rani, but he cannot. He, too, sides with Rani, and when Mala suddenly lands up, she starts to suspect their relationship. Later, she realizes Raghu's righteousness. Nevertheless, Rani does not leave her challenge, making Raghu suffer greatly. Ultimately, she picks up Naagu and plays a drama by introducing him as her fiancé, but Raghu does not yield. Besides, wicked Naagu ploys to double-cross, which are fezzed by Rani when angered Naagu reveals Rani's birth secret. At last, Roopa Devi realizes her mistake and accepts Rani and Mala as her daughter-in-law. Finally, the movie ends happily with the family's reunion.

== Cast ==
- Bhanumathi Ramakrishna as Rani
- Akkineni Nageshwara Rao as Raghu
- Krishna Kumari as Mala
- Jaggayya as Nagu
- Gummadi as Raja Jagannatha Rao
- Relangi as Chitti
- Ramana Reddy as Potti
- Raja Babu as Basavaiah
- Nellore Kantha Rao as Jogulu
- Nagaraju as Chinnababu
- G. Varalakshmi as Roopa Devi
- L. Vijayalakshmi as item number
- Jhansi as Raji

== Soundtrack ==
Antastulu

Film score by K. V. Mahadevan
- Released: 1965
- Genre: Soundtrack
- Length: 32:29
- Producer: K. V. Mahadevan

K. V. Mahadevan chronology
Sumangali (1965)	Antastulu (1965)	Thodu Needa (1965)

Music composed by K. V. Mahadevan. Music released on Audio Company.

S. No.	Song title	Lyrics	Singers	Length
1	"Tella Cheera Kattukunnadi"	Acharya Aatreya	Ghantasala, P. Susheela	4:20
2	"Dulapara Bulloda"	Kosaraju	Bhanumathi Ramakrishna	4:56
3	"Maikamlo Unnanu"	Arudra	Ghantasala	3:10
4	"Ninu Veedani Needanu Nenu"	Acharya Aatreya	P. Susheela	5:28
5	"Nuvvante Naakenduko"	Acharya Aatreya	Ghantasala, P. Susheela	4:27
6	"Aa Devudu Manishiga"	Kosaraju	Madhavapeddi Satyam, Pithapuram	3:49
7	"Vinara Vissanna"	Arudra	Bhanumathi Ramakrishna	3:18
8	"Devi Nee Karuna"	Acharya Aatreya	Ghantasala	1:05
9	"Paikamto Konalenidi"	Arudra	P. Susheela	1:56

== Awards ==
- National Film Award for Best Feature Film in Telugu - V. B. Rajendra Prasad
- Filmfare Award for Best Film – Telugu - V. B. Rajendra Prasad
- Rashtrapati Award from Govt of India for Best Actress - Bhanumathi Ramakrishna - 1965

Nandi Awards - 1965

- Best Feature Film - Gold - V. B. Rajendra Prasad
- Second Best Story Writer - Javar Seetharaman
