= Kalai Arasi =

1963 film by A. Kasilingam

- Theatrical release poster
- Directed by: A. Kasilingam
- Story by: T. E. Gnanamurthy
- Starring: M. G. Ramachandran; Bhanumathi
- Cinematography: J. G. Vijayam
- Edited by: S. Natarajan
- Music by: K. V. Mahadevan
- Production company: Sarodi Brothers
- Distributed by: Emgeeyar Pictures
- Release date: 19 April 1963
- Running time: 123 minutes
- Country: India
- Language: Tamil

Kalai Arasi (transl. Queen of Arts) is a 1963 Indian Tamil-language science fiction film directed by A. Kasilingam. The film stars M. G. Ramachandran and Bhanumathi, with M. N. Nambiar, P. S. Veerappa, Rajasree and Sachu, credited as Kumari Saraswathi. It was released on 19 April 1963. This was the first Indian film to feature the concept of aliens visiting Earth.

== Plot ==
Mohan is an honest and hard-working farmer. Vani is the daughter of the rich landlord who lives in the city while their lands are under the supervision of her cousin and suitor, the wily Kannan. On a visit to the village with her friends, Vani meets Mohan. Mohan and Vani find themselves falling in love with each other gradually.

Meanwhile, a spacecraft is moving rapidly towards the earth. Inside are two aliens who resemble earthly humans. From their conversation it is understood that they are travelling to Earth on a strange mission. Apparently their planet has made far-reaching strides in science, but is woefully backward in performing arts. Hence they are coming to Earth to identify and take a talented artiste who could teach their denizens music and dance. As they near Earth, one of the aliens, Thinna, who is the commander-in-chief of their planet, switches on a monitor, and the screen shows music and dance performances in various parts of Earth. He seems to be dissatisfied with them all, until he comes across Vani singing. He is mesmerised with her performance and decides that she would best suit their purpose.

Returning home after a clandestine moonlight rendezvous with Mohan, Vani falls into the clutches of the aliens. Thinna drags her inside the spacecraft, while the other alien Malla elects to stay on in the earth for a while. Vani is shocked when she finds herself far away from Earth. The king of the alien planet assures her that she will return safely after she had taught them dance and music. Vani is defiant and furious. However, princess Rajini treats her kindly and Vani agrees to teach her. Meanwhile, back in the earth Vani's father blames Kannan for Vani's disappearance. Kannan goes in search of Vani and comes across a mentally deranged girl called Valli who bears a striking resemblance to Vani. Assuming she is Vani, he gets her kidnapped and brings her home. Saddened to see his daughter a lunatic, Vani's father agrees for Kannan to marry her, and thus Kannan marries the poor Valli, under the assumption that he is marrying the rich heiress Vani.

Mohan spies the alien Malla one night as Malla is getting ready to return to his planet. They have a brief skirmish and Malla dies. Thinna lands in his spacecraft just then to take Malla home. He sees Malla's corpse and places it in an ante-chamber inside the craft. Watching all this, Mohan enters the craft quickly, and dragging Malla's corpse out, he jumps into the ante-chamber. Thinna does not notice this and takes off from the earth. When he nears his planet, he ejects what he assumes to be Malla's corpse from his spacecraft, but it is actually Mohan who falls into the alien planet. By happenstance Mohan comes across a kind-hearted jester from another planet who is on the way to the palace. This jester takes Mohan to his house and feeds him. As they step outside, the jester is struck dead by a passing meteor. As luck would have it, the jester had resembled Mohan in facial features, and so Mohan takes his place and goes to the palace. There he meets Vani and manages to make her realise his true identity. They outwit the cunning Thinna and return to Earth. Meanwhile, Kannan is caught strangling Valli and is arrested by the police. Mohan and Vani reach home. What happens next transpires the crux of the story.

== Cast ==
- M. G. Ramachandran as Mohan and the jester
- Bhanumathi as Vani and Valli
- M. N. Nambiar as Dheenan
- P. S. Veerappa as Kannan
- Rajasree as Princess Rajini
- Kumari Saraswathi as Sathyabhama

== Production ==
Kalai Arasi was the first Indian film to feature the concept of aliens visiting Earth, as well as the first Tamil space film. The story was written by T. E. Gnanamurthy and the dialogues by Raveendar.

== Soundtrack ==
The music was composed by K. V. Mahadevan.

Song	Singers	Lyricists	Length (mm:ss)
"Pazham Paalai.... Singaaraa Vaa Vaa"	P. Bhanumathi	N. M. Muthukoothan	03:37
"Née Iruppadhu Inge Un Ninaiviruppadhu Enge"	Seerkazhi Govindarajan & P. Susheela	N. M. Muthukoothan	04:36
"Kettaalum Kettadhu Ippadi Kettudakkudaadhu"	A. G. Rathnamala	N. M. Muthukoothan	01:59
"Aasai Vaikkira Idam Theriyanum Marandhuvidaadhe"	P. Bhanumathi & Jikki	Pattukkottai Kalyanasundaram	03:11
"Endrum Illaamal Ondrum Sollamal Inbam Undaavadheno"	P. Leela	Pattukkottai Kalyanasundaram	02:30
"Adhisayam Paarthen Mannile"	Seerkazhi Govindarajan	Pattukkottai Kalyanasundaram	03:37
"Ninaikkum Pothu Nenjum Kannum"	P. Bhanumathi	Pattukkottai Kalyanasundaram	03:31
"Neelavaana Pandhalin Keezhe Nilamadandhai Madiyin Mele"	T. M. Soundararajan	Alangudi Somu	02:56
"Neelavaana Pandhalin Keezhe Nilamadandhai Madiyin Mele" (pathos)	T. M. Soundararajan	Alangudi Somu	02:34
"Kalaiye Un Ezhil Meni"	Seerkazhi Govindarajan & P. Bhanumathi	Kannadasan	02:12

== Release and reception ==
Kalai Arasi was released on 19 April 1963, and distributed by Emgeeyar Pictures in Madras. The Indian Express said, "[T]he film has all the ingredients that make a successful box office production. The film is exceptionally good in outdoor and trick photography, for which credit goes to the cinematographer J. G. Vijayam." Kanthan of Kalki reviewed the film more negatively, but appreciated the songs and called the spacecraft one of the best things in the film. The film was commercially unsuccessful during its initial release, but gained cult status in later years.

== See also ==
- Science fiction films in India
