= Manamagan Thevai =

1957 film by P. S. Ramakrishna Rao

- Theatrical release poster
- Directed by: P. S. Ramakrishna Rao
- Screenplay by: P. S. Ramakrishna Rao
- Based on: The Fabulous Senorita
- Produced by: P. S. Ramakrishna Rao
- Starring: Sivaji Ganesan; Bhanumathi
- Edited by: M. Sundaram
- Music by: G. Ramanathan
- Production company: Bharani Pictures
- Distributed by: Subbu & Co.
- Release date: 17 May 1957
- Country: India
- Languages: Tamil; Telugu

Manamagan Thevai (transl. Bridegroom Wanted) is a 1957 Indian Tamil-language romantic comedy film produced and directed by P. S. Ramakrishna Rao. The film stars Sivaji Ganesan and Bhanumathi. Based on the American film The Fabulous Senorita (1952), it was simultaneously produced in Telugu as Varudu Kaavaali, with Jaggayya replacing Ganesan. Manamagan Thevai was a commercial success, running for over 100 days in theatres.

== Plot ==
Bhanumathi, the daughter of a wealthy man, desires to marry a shy professor named Vijayakumar instead of the wealthy suitor her father has chosen for her. To escape from trouble, she creates the fake identity of a twin sister, and in the hodgepodge that ensues, ends up in bigger trouble.

== Cast ==
- Sivaji Ganesan as Vijayakumar (Jaggayya in Telugu)
- Bhanumathi as Bhanumathi
- Ragini as the dancer
- Devika (credited as Premila) as Chandramathi

=== Tamil version ===
- T. R. Ramachandran as K. Dhandapani (K. D.)
- Chandrababu as Chandrababu
- Karunanidhi as Manohar
- Javar Seetharaman as College Principal

The uncredited cast includes T. N Sivathanu as Karadipatti Zamindar Ananda Rangam and K. D. Santhanam as Ponnambalam.

=== Telugu version ===
- Ramana Reddy

== Production ==
Manamagan Thevai was based on the American film The Fabulous Senorita (1952). It was produced by P. S. Ramakrishna Rao and his wife Bhanumathi under their company Bharani Pictures. Rao also served as director, while Bhanumathi played the female lead. The film was produced as a Tamil-Telugu bilingual (the Telugu version titled as Varudu Kaavaali), with Sivaji Ganesan playing the male lead in Tamil, and Jaggayya replacing him in Telugu. Devika was cast on Bhanumathi's recommendation, and was credited as Premila.

== Soundtrack ==
The music was composed by G. Ramanathan. A carnatic Kriti composed by Ghanam Krishna Iyer in the raga Bhairavi was used in the film, sung by Bhanumathi. The song "Pambara Kannale" belongs to Baila, a Sri Lankan musical genre. It was later sampled in the song "En Peru Meenakumari", composed by Devi Sri Prasad for Kanthaswamy (2009).

Song	Singers	Lyrics	Length
"Yengo Kulukku Thalukku Thavalaiyaa"	P. Bhanumathi	A. Maruthakasi	02:33
"Pambara Kannaale Kaadhal Sangadhi Sonnaale"	J. P. Chandrababu	K. D. Santhanam	03:18
"Krishna Nee Begane Maaro.... Malaharaa Verengum Palaa"	P. Bhanumathi		2:02
"Kodai Idi Kaatru"	A. M. Rajah & Jikki	A. Maruthakasi	03:10
"Velavare Ummai Thedi Oru Madandhai"	P. Bhanumathi	Ghanam Krishna Iyer	03:00
"Vennilaa Jodhiyai Veesudhe"	P. Bhanumathi, Ghantasala, Pithapuram Nageswara Rao	A. Maruthakasi	04:49
"Nenjinile Pugundhu"	P. Bhanumathi	A. Maruthakasi	03:33
"Nan Thaan Un Kaadhalan"	Seerkazhi Govindarajan, P. Bhanumathi	A. Maruthakasi	00:56
"Pottaare Oru Podudhaan"	A. P. Komala, A. G. Rathnamala, K. Jamuna Rani	A. Maruthakasi	01:54
"Poovaamal Kaayaadhu.... Kaadhal Kalyaaname Seidha Paappaa"	P. Leela	Thanjai N. Ramaiah Dass	04:23
"Vanthaal Varattum Podi"	M. L. Vasanthakumari	A. Maruthakasi	3:07

== Reception ==
Kanthan of Kalki criticised the film for its screenplay and felt the characters were unenjoyable. Despite this, Manamagan Thevai was a commercial success, running for over 100 days in theatres.
