= Mangammagari Manavadu =

1984 Indian Telugu film by Kodi Ramakrishna

- Theatrical release poster
- Directed by: Kodi Ramakrishna
- Written by: Ganesh Patro (dialogues)
- Screenplay by: Kodi Ramakrishna
- Story by: Bharathiraja
- Produced by: S. Gopal Reddy
- Starring: Nandamuri Balakrishna; Bhanumathi Ramakrishna; Suhasini Maniratnam
- Cinematography: D. Prasad Babu
- Edited by: K. Satyam
- Music by: K. V. Mahadevan
- Production company: Bhargav Art Productions
- Release date: 7 September 1984
- Running time: 129 minutes
- Country: India
- Language: Telugu

Mangammagari Manavadu (transl. Grandson of Mangamma) is a 1984 Telugu-language drama film. It was produced by S. Gopala Reddy under the Bhargav Art Productions banner and directed by Kodi Ramakrishna. It stars Nandamuri Balakrishna, Bhanumathi Ramakrishna, Suhasini Maniratnam with music composed by K. V. Mahadevan. The film is a remake of Tamil movie Mann Vasanai (1983).

== Plot ==
The film begins in a village where Mangamma, an indomitable woman, resides with her valiant grandson Veeranna—the village feuds with adjacent, whose forefront is bloodthirsty Basavaiah. Chantabbai, Mangamma's son-in-law, always brings Basavaiah off in the bullfight, which inflames him. Mangamma & Chantabbai's families have held conflicts for a long time. However, Veeranna darlings his cousin Malli, who wins over their rift, and the elders decide the wedlock. Parallelly, Chantabbai maintains an adulterous fling with a sly Chintamani, her brother Chandarraju's passion for Malli. So, Chantabbai kicks them out when Chintamani entices Basavaiah, and they all conspire on the eve of the bullfight festival. At that point, Basavaiah incites drunkard Chantabbai to knit his daughter, whoever beats his bull, which Chandarraju does by anesthetizing it. As a result, Chantabbai severs himself from the nullification of the bet. After a while, Basavaiah mandated Malli's surrender. Still, the roaring of Mangamma drives them away, and the village looks forward to performing the alliance of Veeranna & Malli. Forthwith, Veeranna proceeds to collect wedding accessories. On his way back, Basavaiah backstabbed him and declared him dead. Being conscious of it, Malli turns insane to save her Brahmachari benevolent teacher letters in Veeranna's name. 1 year later, Malli receives a letter from Veeranna that he is arriving the following day, and she is on cloud nine. She collapses after witnessing Veeranna landing with a Punjabi girl whom everyone supposes he has espoused her. Then, Veeranna spins back while under attack. He assumed that he slays Basavaiah's men. Due to fear of sentence, Veeranna absconded and enrolled in the army. He befriends a soldier, Azim Singh, who died while shielding him in a battle and entrusting his sister's responsibility to Veeranna. Now, Mangamma decides that Veeranna should splice the Punjabi girl. Knowing the current state, the Punjabi girl is about to quit when Malli bars, decorates her as a bride, and attempts suicide just as Basavaiah & Chandarraju abducts her. At last, Mangamma & Veeranna cease the baddies when the Punjabi girl sacrifices her life for Mangamma. Finally, the movie ends on a happy note with the marriage of Veeranna & Malli.

== Cast ==
- Nandamuri Balakrishna as Veeranna
- Bhanumathi Ramakrishna as Mangamma
- Suhasini Maniratnam as Malli
- Gollapudi Maruthi Rao as Brahmachari Master
- Gokina Rama Rao as Chantabbai
- Raavi Kondala Rao
- Yeleswaram Ranga as Basavaiah
- Telephone Satyanarayana as President Rayudu
- Kullamani
- Balaji as Chandar Raju
- Anitha as Annapurna
- Y. Vijaya as Chintamani

== Soundtrack ==
Mangammagari Manavadu

Film score by K. V. Mahadevan
- Released: 1984
- Genre: Soundtrack
- Length: 21:08
- Label: AVM Audio
- Producer: K. V. Mahadevan

K. V. Mahadevan chronology
Janani Janmabhoomi (1984)	Mangammagari Manavadu (1984)	Maa Pallelo Gopaludu (1985)

Music composed by K. V. Mahadevan. Lyrics were written by C. Narayana Reddy. Music released on AVM Audio Company.

No.	Title	Singer(s)	Length
1.	"Danchave Menatta Koothura"	S. P. Balasubrahmanyam, P. Susheela	3:31
2.	"Chandurudu Ninnu Choosi"	S. P. Balasubrahmanyam, P. Susheela	4:07
3.	"Gumma Choopu"	S. P. Balasubrahmanyam, S.P. Sailaja	4:51
4.	"Vangathota Kaada"	S. P. Balasubrahmanyam, P. Susheela	4:27
5.	"Sri Suryanarayana"	Bhanumathi Ramakrishna, Vani Jayaram	4:12

== Box office ==
The film was a major box office success and celebrated a silver jubilee. It was the first 100-day film for Nandamuri Balakrishna as solo hero. The film was his breakthrough as lead actor. It ran for 100 days in Karnataka and 565 days in Hyderabad, making it the longest running Telugu film at the time.
