= Thodu Needa =

1965 film directed by Adurthi Subba Rao

- Theatrical release poster
- Directed by: Adurthi Subba Rao
- Screenplay by: Adurthi Subba Rao
- Based on: Karpagam (1963) by K. S. Gopalakrishnan
- Produced by: N. N. Bhatt; A. Rami Reddy
- Starring: N. T. Rama Rao; Bhanumathi; Jamuna
- Cinematography: M. K. Raju
- Edited by: T. Krishna
- Music by: K. V. Mahadevan
- Production company: Vijayabhatt Movies
- Release date: 12 May 1965
- Running time: 150 minutes
- Country: India
- Language: Telugu

Thodu Needa (transl. Companion and protective shade) is a 1965 Indian Telugu-language drama film written and directed by Adurthi Subba Rao. The film stars N. T. Rama Rao, Bhanumathi and Jamuna, with music composed by K. V. Mahadevan. It is a remake of the Tamil film Karpagam (1963). The film was released on 12 May 1965, and emerged a commercial success.

== Cast ==
- N. T. Rama Rao as Gopi
- Bhanumathi as Lakshmi
- Jamuna as Radha
- S. V. Ranga Rao as Dharma Rao
- V. Nagayya as Collector Ananda Rao
- Nagabhushanam as Nagaraju
- Ramakrishna as Raja
- Geetanjali as Rani
- Baby Shakeela as Viji
- Raavi Kondala Rao as the doctor
- Baby Rani

== Production ==
Thodu Needa is a remake of the Tamil film Karpagam (1963). S. V. Ranga Rao and V. Nagayya reprised their roles from that film.

== Music ==
The soundtrack was composed by K. V. Mahadevan. Lyrics were written by Acharya Aatreya. Bhanumathi sang the original version of the song "Que Sera, Sera (Whatever Will Be, Will Be)" in the film with minor changes in the lyrics.

Song title	Singers	length
"Valapuloni"	P. B. Sreenivas, S. Janaki	3:39
"Enno Ratrulu"	Bhanumathi	4:12
"Mallunnaa"	Ghantasala, P. Susheela	3:36
"Attha Odi Puvvuvale"	P. Susheela	4:03
"Jolapata"	Bhanumathi Ramakrishna	3:33
"Mohini Bhasmasura"	Ghantasala, P. Susheela	5:06

== Release and reception ==
Thodu Needa was released on 12 May 1965, and emerged a commercial success. Vasiraju Prakasam of Andhra Patrika appreciated the story, music, cast and direction of the film in his review. B. V. Rao of Andhra Janata reviewed the film as an enlightening film depicting sacrifice and selfishness. He appreciated the performances of the cast.
