= Chandirani =

1953 film by P. Bhanumathi

- Theatrical release poster
- Directed by: Bhanumathi
- Screenplay by: P. S. Ramakrishna Rao
- Story by: Bhanumathi
- Dialogue by: Samudrala Sr (Telugu); Udayakumar (Tamil); Pt. Sudarshan (Hindi)
- Produced by: P. S. Ramakrishna Rao
- Starring: Bhanumathi; N. T. Rama Rao; S. V. Ranga Rao; Relangi (Telugu/Tamil); Agha (Hindi)
- Cinematography: P. S. Selvaraj
- Edited by: P. S. Ramakrishna Rao
- Music by: C. R. Subburaman; M. S. Viswanathan
- Production company: Bharani Pictures
- Release date: 28 August 1953
- Running time: 164 minutes
- Country: India
- Languages: Telugu; Tamil; Hindi

Chandirani is a 1953 Indian swashbuckler film directed by P. Bhanumathi and produced by P. S. Ramakrishna Rao under the Bharani Pictures banner. The film was shot simultaneously in Telugu, Tamil, and Hindi languages. It stars Bhanumathi, N. T. Rama Rao, S. V. Ranga Rao, and Relangi in the Telugu and Tamil versions and Agha in the Hindi version. Bhanumathi also wrote the story while Ramakrishna Rao penned the screenplay. The film's music was composed by C. R. Subburaman and M. S. Viswanathan. Chandirani was released on 28 August 1953 in all three languages.

== Plot ==
The film opens with the birthday celebrations of King Veerasimha, who, in disguise, visits the town and becomes captivated by the dance of a commoner. Despite opposition from Chief Commander Prachanda and other royal officials, the King makes her his queen. The queen later gives birth to identical twin daughters, Chandirani (Chandi) and Champarani (Champa). However, driven by vengeance, Prachanda kills the queen, causing the King to go insane. Exploiting the King’s madness, Prachanda seizes the throne and plots to kill the princesses.

The loyal Chief Minister saves the younger princess, Chandi, by sending her into the forest and attempts to flee with the elder princess, Champa. However, Prachanda kills the Chief Minister and captures Champa. Before his death, the Chief Minister entrusts his son, Kishore, to his loyal servant, Ram Singh, with the charge of protecting the royal family. Prachanda claims the throne and raises Champa as a prisoner while Chandi grows up in the forest.

Years later, Chandi and Champa have grown up under drastically different circumstances. Chandi becomes lively and spirited, while Champa remains sheltered as a royal prisoner. Prachanda’s oppressive rule leads to unrest in the kingdom, prompting the courageous Kishore to take action. Ram Singh, recognizing the importance of safeguarding the royal family, reveals the past to Kishore and tasks him with finding and protecting the princesses.

Kishore infiltrates Prachanda’s army by earning the trust of Prachanda’s naive son, Mukunda. He first meets Champa and later seeks out Chandi in the forest. Upon revealing the truth to the sisters, Kishore gains their trust and affection, though he grows closer to Champa, while Chandi supports their bond.

Suspicious of Kishore’s growing influence, Prachanda arranges a marriage between Champa and Mukunda. Meanwhile, Chandi infiltrates the palace, meets her sister, and the two swap identities. As Chandi embarks on a strategic plan to confront Prachanda, she reaches out to her father for support.

When Prachanda discovers Champa’s presence at Ram Singh’s house, he captures both sisters and Kishore. In the film’s climax, Chandi leads an assault on Prachanda’s fortress with the help of the people, ultimately defeating him and ending his tyranny. In a final act of sacrifice, Chandi gives her life, ensuring the safety of Kishore and Champa, who are then able to unite.

== Cast ==
- Bhanumathi as Chandi / Champa (dual role)
- N. T. Rama Rao as Kishore
- S. V. Ranga Rao as Prachanda
- Relangi as Mukunda (Agha in Hindi)
- Vidyavathi as Queen Kantha
- Hemalatha as an old woman
- Kumari Tulasi as a peasant girl
- Angamuthu as a maid
- Amarnath as Maharaja Veerasimha
- Doraswamy as Ramsingh
- R. Nageswara Rao as Marthand
- Venkataraman
- Raj Kumar
- Ganapathi Bhat

== Soundtrack ==
The music for the film was composed by C. R. Subburaman and M. S. Viswanathan.

=== Telugu ===
Lyrics were written by Samudrala Sr.

Song	Singers	Lyrics	Length (m:ss)
"Eeroju Bhale Roju Ide Prema Idena"	P. Bhanumathi	Samudrala Sr.	
"Indhuko Teliyani Ennadu Anukoni Ee Sambaraalemiti"	P. Bhanumathi	Samudrala Sr.	02:14
"Evaraalakinturu Naamora Enaleni Vedana"	P. Bhanumathi	Samudrala Sr.	03:01
"Kilaa Kilaa Navvulaa Kurisene Vennelaa"	P. Bhanumathi	Samudrala Sr.	02:08
"O Taraka O Jabilee Navvulela Nanu Gane"	Ghantasala, P. Bhanumathi	Samudrala Sr.	03:41
"Meow Meow Meow"	K. Rani, Udutha Sarojini, K. Jamuna Rani	Samudrala Sr.	
"Swadesaniki Samajaaniki"	Pithapuram Nageswara Rao, A. P. Komala	Samudrala Sr.	02:48
"Ravo Varaala Elika Konavoyi Kanukaa"	K. Rani	Samudrala Sr.	02:00
"Eevoyyara Neevilasa Mogorada Raja"	A. P. Komala	Samudrala Sr.	

=== Tamil ===
Lyrics were written by K. D. Santhanam. The song "Vaan Meedhile Inba Then Maari Peiyudhe" is set in the Carnatic music raga 'Pahaadi'.

Song	Singers	Lyrics	Length (m:ss)
"En Vaazhvinile Naan Magizhum Naal Idhuve Thaan"	P. Bhanumathi	K. D. Santhanam	
"Innadhendru Ariyaamal Unnmaiyum Unaraamal"	P. Bhanumathi	K. D. Santhanam	02:14
"En Vaazhvellaam Siraivaasamo"	P. Bhanumathi	K. D. Santhanam	03:01
"Nilaa Nilaa Odi Vaa Nillaamal Odi Vaa"	P. Bhanumathi	K. D. Santhanam	02:08
"Vaan Meedhile Inba Then Maari Peiyudhe"	Ghantasala & P. Bhanumathi	K. D. Santhanam	03:41
"Meow Meow Meow"	K. Rani, Udutha Sarojini & K. Jamuna Rani	K. D. Santhanam	
"Anbaai Dhesamenggum Ondraai Koodi"	C. R. Subburaman, P. Susheela, Chorus	K. D. Santhanam	02:48
"Vaaraamale Vadha Naalidhe Suba Naalidhe"	K. Rani	K. D. Santhanam	02:00
"Maavinodha Maasilaadha Madhanaa"	A. P. Komala	K. D. Santhanam	

=== Hindi ===
Lyrics were written by Vishwamitra Adil.

Song	Singers	Lyrics	Length (m:ss)
"Barbad Hu Naushad Hu"	P. Bhanumathi	Vishwamitra Adil	
"Kaun Aa Gaya"	P. Bhanumathi	Vishwamitra Adil	02:14
"Bholi Si Naar Hu Gaati Bahar Hu"	P. Bhanumathi	Vishwamitra Adil	03:01
"Khili Khili Bahar Hai"	P. Bhanumathi	Vishwamitra Adil	02:08
"Chanda Tale Muskuraye Jawaniya"	Talat Mehmood & P. Bhanumathi	Vishwamitra Adil	03:41
"Meow Meow Meow"	K. Rani, Udutha Sarojini & K. Jamuna Rani	Vishwamitra Adil	
"Maan Ja Jaan Ja Dilwale"	P. Bhanumathi	Vishwamitra Adil	02:48
"Mera Billa Gora Hai Aur Teri Billi Kaali"	Madhubala Jhaveri	Vishwamitra Adil	02:00
"Dene Badhayi Aa Gayi"	Meena Kapoor	Vishwamitra Adil	

== Critical reception ==
M. L. Narasimham of The Hindu wrote, "Though there is nothing new in the story, the novelty lies in the manner it is narrated. Chandi's sword fight and the fight sequences with the tiger, the exchange of places by the siblings, went well with the audience."

The film was a profitable venture. As of 2013, Chandirani held the record of being the only film to be released in three languages on the same day (28 August 1953). Bhanumathi also became the first woman director to write and direct a film that achieved this feat.
