= Raja Mukthi =

- Directed by: Raja Chandrasekhar
- Written by: Pudhumaipithan; Nanjilnaadu T. N. Rajappa (dialogues)
- Screenplay by: Raja Chandrasekhar
- Story by: S. R. Krishna Iyengar
- Produced by: M. K. Thyagaraja Bhagavathar
- Starring: M. K. Thyagaraja Bhagavathar; M. G. Ramachandran; V. N. Janaki; P. Bhanumathi
- Cinematography: Pandurang Naik; Surendra Pai
- Edited by: M. D. Jadhav
- Music by: C. R. Subburaman
- Production company: Narendra Pictures
- Release date: 9 October 1948
- Country: India
- Language: Tamil

Raja Mukthi (transl. Noble Realisation) is a 1948 Indian Tamil language film starring M. K. Thyagaraja Bhagavathar, V. N. Janaki and P. Bhanumathi, with M. G. Ramachandran in a supporting role. The film was released on 9 October 1948.

== Plot ==
King Rajendra Varman and Queen Mrinalini are reigning over the Vyjayanti empire. Mahendra Varman is the rival and the neighbouring king. Kannika is the minister's daughter, who is in love with Rajendra and aims to attain him at any cost.

The tale of palace intrigue, suspicion, unreciprocated love, seduction, villainy, and piety is interspersed with Tamil film music.

== Cast ==
Actor	Role
M. K. Thyagaraja Bhagavathar	King Rajendra Varman
M. G. Ramachandran	Mahendra Varman
V. N. Janaki	Queen Mrinalini
P. Bhanumathi	Kannika
M. G. Chakrapani	Minister
Serukulathur Sama	
P. S. Veerappa	
M. R. Swaminathan	
P. G. Venkatesan	
C. T. Rajakantham	

== Production ==
M. K. Thyagaraja Bhagavathar produced this movie himself under his banner Narendra Pictures. He had done so in order to avoid shooting the movie in Madras, where he had been imprisoned for more than two years. He booked Prabhat Studios in Poona and leased a bungalow to accommodate his cast. Most of the technicians were from Prabhat Studios.

== Soundtrack ==
Alathur Subramaniam, one the two Alathur Brothers, trained the singers, while the background music was composed by C. R. Subburaman. The lyrics were written by Papanasam Sivan. M. K. Thyagaraja Bhagavathar, P. Bhanumathi, Serukalathur Sama, and C. T. Rajakantham were the singers. The playback singer was M. L. Vasanthakumari. The song Pongum anbar in ragamaliga is composed of ragas Bilahari, Purvikalyani, Mohanam, Madhyamavathi, and Sindhu Bhairavi. Indirajaala ragamaliga is composed of Jonpuri, Pantuvarali, and Kaapi.

No.	Song	Raga	Singers	Length (m:ss)
1	"Unai Allaal OIru Thurumbuasaiyumo O Paandurangaa"	Saramathi	M. K. Thyagaraja Bhagavathar	03:08
2	"Kulakkodi Thazhaikka" (Raagam: Kamakriya)	Ramapriya	M. L. Vasanthakumari	02:20
3	"Maanida Jenmam Meendum Vandhidumo"	Kamas	M. K. Thyagaraja Bhagavathar	03:01
4	"Sarasa Sallaabam Seiyya Arugil Vaarumaiyya"		P. Bhanumathi	
5	"Nee Palli Ezhundhaal Alladhu Uyirgal Urakkam Theliyumo"	Poobalam	M. K. Thyagaraja Bhagavathar	
6	"Ingum Angum Engum Inbame"	Madhyamavati	M. K. Thyagaraja Bhagavathar & M. L. Vasanthakumari	02:40
7	"Machchi Un Mugatthil Meesaiyai Kaanom"		P. G. Venkatesan & C. T. Rajakantham	02:29
8	"Piravikkadal Thaandiye"	Senjurutti	M. K. Thyagaraja Bhagavathar	
9	"Sandhoshamaai Anbar Varuvaaradi"		M. L. Vasanthakumari & P. Bhanumathi	
10	"Manam Ninaindheginene"	Kambhoji	M. K. Thyagaraja Bhagavathar	02:55
11	"Indirajaala Vidhdhaikkaaran"	Ragamaliga	Serukulathur Sama	
12	"Swaami Arunkanigal Ivaiye Paareer"		M. K. Thyagaraja Bhagavathar & P. Bhanumathi	
13	"Aaraaro Nee Aaraaro"	Yaman Kalyani	M. L. Vasanthakumari	02:25
14	"Enna Aanandham"	Lathangi	M. K. Thyagaraja Bhagavathar & M. L. Vasanthakumari	02:20
15	"Subrapatham .. Ananda Suryodayam	Nattai	M. K. Thyagaraja Bhagavathar	
16	"Pongum Anbar"	Ragamaliga	M. K. Thyagaraja Bhagavathar	

== Trivia ==
- The famous T. N. Rajarathinam Pillai played the nadaswaram for a sequence.
- The music records of Raja Mukthi witnessed record sales even before the movie's release.
- C. R. Subburaman had introduced a new female singer M. L. Vasanthakumari to Tamil cinema through Raja Mukthi in a debut as a playback singer.
- Raja Mukthi had an average run. This film was lengthy and it had no comedy scenes. The producer didn't face any loss from this film, though the expectation was very high.
