= Pelli Kanuka (1998 film) =

- VCD cover
- Directed by: Kodi Ramakrishna
- Screenplay by: Kodi Ramakrishna
- Dialogues by: Posani Krishna Murali
- Story by: N. V. S. Unit (adapted); Subhash Ghai (original)
- Based on: Pardes (1997) by Subhash Ghai
- Produced by: Nannapaneni Anna Rao
- Starring: Jagapati Babu; Lakshmi; Bhanumathi Ramakrishna
- Cinematography: Kodi Lakshmana Rao
- Edited by: Suresh Tata
- Music by: M. M. Keeravani
- Production company: N. V. S. Creations
- Release date: 26 June 1998
- Running time: 142 minutes
- Country: India
- Language: Telugu

Pelli Kanuka (transl. Wedding Gift) is a 1998 Telugu-language drama film, produced by Nannapaneni Anna Rao under the N. V. S. Creations banner and directed by Kodi Ramakrishna. The film stars Jagapati Babu, Lakshmi, Bhanumathi Ramakrishna with music composed by M. M. Keeravani. The film is a remake of the 1997 Hindi film Pardes. It was Bhanumathi's last film appearance to date.

== Plot ==
The film begins with Savitramma, an industrialist at Delhi, visiting her native village after many years. Currently, she meets her old family friend Sitaramaraju's family. During her stay in the conservative, she relishes the traditional culture and love of Sitaramaraju's daughter, Ganga. Accordingly, she desires to knit Ganga with her westernized grandson, Srinivasa Prasad / Chintu. Sitaramaraju's family accepts the proposal. Savitramma knows she will have a tough time convincing her grandson to nuptial. Hence, she assigns the task to her foster son, Sagar / Airport. Sagar lands in the village ahead of Chintu to set the stage for him to meet Ganga. Chintu arrives and acts offensively, sometimes intentionally, and sometimes because he has no idea of anything Indians consider rude or inappropriate. But Sagar, despite his attraction to Ganga, smoothens the way out. In his determination to help the marriage, Sagar deceives Ganga about Chintu's character and covers his bad habits.

After the engagement, the families mutually agree to go to Delhi before the wedding sets foot. Whereat she is hurt to hear Chintu's parents despise traditionality. In her new surroundings, her only friend and confidant is Sagar, and she expands an inherent bond with him. For now, Ganga realizes Chintu's wicked shade and breaks out before Sagar. So, she questions Chintu about this, and he misbehaves with her, and Sagar revolts against Chintu. Here, Chintu manipulates and poses Sagar as an impostor before Savitramma. So, Savitramma excludes Sagar from the house to Agra. Afterward, Ganga decides to forbid the espousal and return to her village. Before leaving, Chintu ploys and takes her to Agra to show her favorite spot Taj Mahal. Therein, he tries to molest her, but she escapes. Parallelly, Sagar also moves for her rescue; they meet near the Taj Mahal and back to the village. Before they reach, Chintu falsifies Ganga's family by saying Ganga eloped with Sagar. Being conscious of it, Ganga's family assaults Sagar and surrenders Ganga to Chintu. During that plight, Savitramma arrives, reveals the reality, disowns her family, and accepts Sagar as her heir. Now, she decides to go ahead with Ganga's marriage to Sagar.

== Cast ==
- Jagapati Babu as Sagar / Airport
- Lakshmi as Ganga
- Bhanumathi Ramakrishna as Savitramma
- Viren Chaudhury as Srinivasa Prasad / Chintu
- Sudhakar as Bholak Singh
- Mallikarjuna Rao as Sitaramaraju
- Pokula Narasimha Rao as Sitaramaraju's father
- John as Robert Kristopher / Ramakrishna
- Chalasani Krishna Rao as Venkanna (Chintu's father)
- Rajitha as Indira
- Radha Prasanthi as Lavanya (Chintu's mother)
- Indu Anand as Sitaramaraju's wife

== Soundtrack ==
Pelli Kanuka

Film score by M. M. Keeravani
- Released: 1998
- Genre: Soundtrack
- Length: 25:10
- Label: T Series
- Producer: M. M. Keeravani

M. M. Keeravani chronology
Zakhm (1998)	Pelli Kanuka (1998)	Sri Sita Ramula Kalyanam Chootamu Raarandi (1999)

The music was composed by M.M. Keeravani with lyrics by Sirivennela Sitarama Sastry. The music was released on T Series Music Company.

No.	Title	Singer(s)	Length
1.	"Suvvi Suvvi Suvvala"	S. P. Balasubrahmanyam, Chithra, Malgudi Subha	4:26
2.	"Rammane Kanti Reppala"	S. P. Balasubrahmanyam, Chithra	3:35
3.	"Bangaru Bommaki"	S. P. Balasubrahmanyam, Bhanumathi Ramakrishna	4:50
4.	"Ee Gaali Ee Nela"	Chithra, M.M. Keeravani	4:35
5.	"Kovela Pavurama"	Chithra	4:00
6.	"Manninchamma"	S. P. Balasubrahmanyam	3:44
7.	"Suvvi Suvvi Suvvala (Pathos)"	Chithra	1:35
Total length:			25:10

== Reception ==
P Rakesh of the Deccan Herald wrote, "The effective synchronisation of lyrics and the musical score makes Pelli Kanuka a good treat. On the whole, a family entertainer". On the contrary, a critic from Andhra Today rated the film one out of five stars and wrote, "On the whole, director Kodi Ramakrishna's attempt to woo the audience with his story line is an utter failure".

== Awards ==
- Nandi Award for Best Female Comedian - Rajitha
