= Ammayi Pelli =

1974 film

- Theatrical release poster
- Directed by: Bhanumathi Ramakrishna
- Written by: D. V. Narasa Raju (dialogues)
- Screenplay by: Bhanumathi Ramakrishna
- Story by: Bhanumathi Ramakrishna; P. S. Vaidyanathan (main story)
- Produced by: Bhanumathi Ramakrishna
- Starring: Bhanumathi Ramakrishna; N. T. Rama Rao
- Cinematography: Lakshman Gore
- Edited by: M. Sundaram
- Music by: Bhanumathi Ramakrishna; Satyam
- Production company: Bharani Pictures
- Release date: 7 March 1974
- Running time: 164 mins
- Country: India
- Language: Telugu

Ammayi Pelli (transl. Daughter's Marriage) is a 1974 Indian Telugu-language comedy-drama film, produced and directed by Bhanumathi Ramakrishna under the Bharani Pictures banner. It starsN. T. Rama Rao, Bhanumathi Ramakrishna with music also composed by Bhanumathi Ramakrishna in association with Satyam.

== Plot ==
The film begins with an ideal couple, Advocate Raghuram & Dr. Lalitha, who lead delightful lives with their 3 children, Padmini (Puppy), Gopi, and Pappu. Raghu and Lalitha select different matches for their daughter Padmini / Puppy, i.e., their juniors Sitaram & Rajaram, respectively. Due to ego, a heated conflict arises after an argument between the couple, leading to plans for divorce. Puppy is already in love with Ravi, the son of their close family friend, Raghava Rao. Then Raghava Rao suggests living separately for two months by sharing the children.

The couple split the house into two sections and live by sharing the children for a month each. The 3 children create various dramas in an attempt to make their parents understand the value of being together and reunite them. However, their plans fail. Several comical incidents occur between the couple, but they are still too adamant to change. Meanwhile, Rajaram and Sitaram frequently make efforts to win Puppy over, but she avoids them, and their efforts are thwarted by Ravi.

One day, Raghu is notified that their family friend Ananda Rao will be visiting them with his family. He informs Lalitha and requests a temporary compromise, asking her to cooperate by acting such that the guests are not aware of their family problems. When Ananda Rao arrives, they remember and celebrate Raghu and Lalitha's marriage anniversary. When the guest family leaves, Raghu and Lalitha split up the house again. The children are horrified, and a heated argument ensues, in which Raghu hits Gopi and Puppy. Dejected, the three children leave the house late at night, leaving a letter for their parents. When they come across a burglar trying to steal from and manhandle a woman, Gopi runs to her rescue and helps. Suddenly, three masked men appear and cease the goons, but also capture the three kids.

The next morning, Lalitha wakes up to find the kids missing. She informs Raghu and becomes mentally disturbed. The couple slowly talk and begin to unite. They receive a call from the kidnappers, who ask for a high ransom in exchange for the kids. The couple do as they say and reach the kidnappers' hideout. The children argue with their parents that they will not come home unless the two unite. Raghu and Lalitha finally reconcile and promise the kids to be together. Astonishingly, the masked "kidnapper" turns out to be Ravi, and the whole situation was a drama they enacted to help reunite the couple. It is revealed that Raghava Rao was the mastermind behind the scheme and is also the one who prompted Ananda Rao to visit the couple's house. The other two masked men are revealed to be none other than Rajaram and Sitaram, who gave up their efforts on Puppy and participated to help the lovebirds unite and win. Finally, the movie ends on a happy note with the marriage of Ravi & Puppy, and Rajaram and Sitaram to Ananda Rao's daughters.

== Cast ==
- Bhanumathi Ramakrishna as Dr. Lalitha
- N. T. Rama Rao as Advocate Raghuram
- Gummadi as Raghava Rao
- Chandra Mohan as Ravi
- Latha as Padmini / Puppy
- Padmanabham as Seetaram
- Dhulipala
- Dr. Sivaramakrishnaiah
- Raavi Kondala Rao
- Mada
- Srikanth as Dr. Rajaram
- Chaya Devi
- Radha Kumari
- Pushpa Kumari
- Master Ramesh as Gopi
- Master Sekhar as Pappu

== Soundtrack ==
Ammayi Pelli

Film score by Bhanumathi Ramakrishna Satyam
- Released: 1974
- Genre: Soundtrack
- Length: 28:34
- Producers: Bhanumathi Ramakrishna; Satyam

Music composed by Bhanumathi Ramakrishna & Satyam.

S. No	Song title	Lyrics	Singers	length
1	"Vandanamu Raghunandana"	Tyagaraja	Bhanumathi Ramakrishna	2:48
2	"Naa Kanula Mundara Nuvvunte"	Dasaradhi	Bhanumathi Ramakrishna	3:29
3	"Paala Raathi Bommaku"	Dasaradhi	S. P. Balasubrahmanyam, S. Janaki	3:36
4	"Babu Nidarapora"	Acharya Aatreya	Ghantasala	2:21
5	"Amma Nanna Jagadamlo"	Ganapathi Sastry	S. Janaki, Vasantha, Savitri	3:40
6	"Gudu Gudu Chedugudu"	Kosaraju	Madhavapeddi Satyam, Pithapuram	3:19
7	"Ee Jeevitam Intenaa"	Dasaradhi	Bhanumathi Ramakrishna	1:45
8	"Radhika Krishna"	Jayadeva	Bhanumathi Ramakrishna	4:18
9	"Madhramaina"	C. Narayana Reddy	P. Susheela	3:18
