= Krishna Prema =

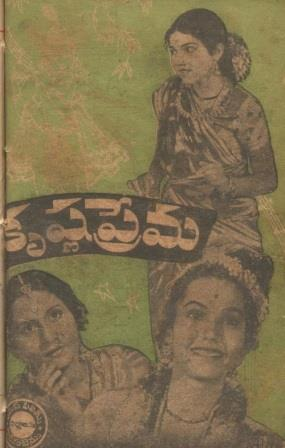
- Poster of Krishna Prema
- Directed by: Hanumappa Vishwanath Babu
- Written by: Tapi Dharma Rao
- Starring: Gali Venkateswara Rao; Santha Kumari; Hemavathi; Bhanumathi Ramakrishna; Addanki Srirama Murthy; Tanguturi Suryakumari
- Cinematography: Jiten Bannerjee; P. N. Selvaraj
- Music by: Gali Penchala Narasimha Rao
- Release date: 1943
- Running time: 184 min.
- Country: India
- Language: Telugu

Krishna Prema is a 1943 musical Telugu film directed by Hanumappa Vishwanath Babu.

== Plot ==
Lord Krishna is revered by every Hindu in Gokulam. Radha's love for Krishna is born out of supreme Bhakthi. But her love was misunderstood by the villagers and her younger sister Chandravali. Chandravali feels that Krishna is responsible for her sister's lonely life and hates him. Chandragopa hates both Radha and Krishna and stays away from Gokulam with his wife Chandravali. Satyabhama is jealous of Radha and dislikes her. Rukmini alone understood both Radha and Krishna. Krishna himself with the help of Narada reveals the nature of divine love to these mortals.

== Cast ==
Character	Actor/Actress
Lord Krishna	Gali Venkateswara Rao
Radha	Santha Kumari
Satyabhama	Hemavathi
Chandravali, younger sister of Radha	Bhanumathi
Mother of Chandravali	Parvathi Bai
Chandragopa	Relangi
Narada	Padmanabham
Rukmini	Jaya Gouri
Vidushaka	Hiranayya

== Soundtrack ==
All music is composed by Gali Penchala Narasimha Rao.

No.	Title	Singer(s)	Length
1.	"Dhanyulamaitimi"	Tanguturi Suryakumari
2.	"Ekkadunnaave Pillaa ekkadunnaave"	Addanki, Bhanumathi
3.	"Gokkula Vihaari"	Tanguturi Suryakumari
4.	"Gopaalude Venugopaalude"	Tanguturi Suryakumari
5.	"Jejelayyaa Johaaru Krishna"	Tanguturi Suryakumari
6.	"Keleelola Krishna Gopala Leelananda Mukunda"	Tanguturi Suryakumari
7.	"Nee Mahimalenna Taramaa Nikhila Lokanadha Krishna"	Tanguturi Suryakumari
8.	"Nee Sari"	Tanguturi Suryakumari
9.	"Oogave Oogave Uyyaalaa"	Bhanumathi Ramakrishna
10.	"Paahimaam"	Tanguturi Suryakumari
11.	"Raaraadaa Aatalaadi Poraadaa"	Tanguturi Suryakumari

== 1961 film ==
The film was remade in 1961 under the direction of Adurthi Subbarao. It stars S. V. Ranga Rao, M. Balayya, S. Varalakshmi and Jamuna with music composed by Pendyala Nageswara Rao.
