= Vipra Narayana =

- Theatrical release poster
- Directed by: P. S. Ramakrishna Rao
- Written by: Samudrala Sr (story / dialogues)
- Produced by: P. S. Ramakrishna Rao
- Starring: Bhanumathi; Akkineni Nageswara Rao; Relangi
- Cinematography: P. S. Selvaraj
- Edited by: P. S. Ramakrishna Rao
- Music by: S. Rajeswara Rao
- Production company: Bharani Studios
- Release date: 10 December 1954
- Running time: 146 mins
- Country: India
- Language: Telugu

Vipra Narayana is a 1954 Telugu-language biographical film directed, produced and edited by P. S. Ramakrishna Rao under Bharani Studios banner. It stars Akkineni Nageswara Rao, Bhanumathi, and Relangi with music composed by S. Rajeswara Rao. The film is based on the life of Tamil Vaishnava saint Vipranarayana. He led his life in devotion to Lord Narayana and worked for the Lord by dedicating him with garlands. He is one of the twelve Alvars. The film is also dubbed in Tamil with the same title and released in 1955.

== Plot ==
Vipra Narayana, a staunch devotee of Vishnu, lives in a hermitage on the banks of the river Kaveri along with his disciple Rangaraju. He worships Vishnu in the form of Ranganatha, the presiding deity of the nearby Srirangam temple. Every day, Narayana makes garlands out of flowers from his garden and offers them to Ranganatha and sings hymns in praise of him.

One day, Devadevi, a devadasi, (Note: Devadasi system is a practice found in parts of south India, where parents marry their daughters to temple deities and the girls are forced to work as sex workers after they attain puberty.) performs a dance recital at the court of the Chola King and is on her way back to home along with her sister Madhuravani. When Devadevi passes through the hermitage, Narayana does not notice her; this hurts Devadevi's vanity. She mistakes his devotion towards Ranganatha as arrogance and decides to teach him a lesson, ignoring Madhuravani's advice.

Devadevi enters Narayana's hermitage as an orphan and narrates her woes, requesting for a stay to support herself. Narayana agrees despite Rangaraju's objection and Devadevi becomes the former's disciple. In a turn of events, Rangaraju is expelled from the hermitage when he tries to send Devadevi away after realising her intentions. As time passes, Narayana finds himself falling for Devadevi's charms.

Once her ego is satisfied, Devadevi begins to regret her act. Madhuravani asks her to return and Narayana follows them. Devadevi's mother Rangasani, upon knowing that Narayana is penniless, throws him out. To help Narayana win, Ranganatha visits Devadevi's house disguised as Rangaraju. He presents a golden vessel from the kitchen of Srirangam temple as a gift from Narayana to Devadevi.

The next day, the priests at the temple complain that the golden vessel is missing and find it at Devadevi's house. Narayana is accused of stealing the vessel and is produced in the court. The King orders that Narayana's hands be amputated as a punishment for theft. Ranganatha appears at the scene and reveals the truth. Ranganatha adds that Narayana is an incarnation of Vyjayanthi, a garland that adorns him at his heavenly abode Vaikuntha and that Devadevi is a gandharva who took a human birth due to a curse. Narayana and Devadevi visit Srirangam temple and sing praises of the deity, before attaining salvation.

== Cast ==
- Akkineni Nageswara Rao as Vipra Narayana
- Bhanumathi as Devadevi
- Relangi as Rangaraju
- Rushyendramani as Mother of Devadevi
- V. Sivaram as Maharaja
- Allu Ramalingaiah
- Sandhya as Madhuravani

== Soundtrack ==
Vipra Narayana

Film score by S. Rajeswara Rao
- Released: 1954
- Genre: Soundtrack
- Length: 49:28
- Producer: S. Rajeswara Rao

S. Rajeswara Rao chronology
Raju Pedha (1954)	Vipra Narayana (1954)	Missamma (1955)

Music was composed by S. Rajeswara Rao. Lyrics were written by Samudrala Sr.

S. No.	Song title	Singers	Length
1	"Meluko Sriranga"	A. M. Rajah	3:15
2	"Anuraagalu Dhooramu"	A. M. Rajah, Bhanumathi Ramakrishna	5:42
3	"Choodumadhe Cheliya"	A. M. Rajah	3:54
4	"Dharicherukora Ranga"	A. M. Rajah	2:00
5	"Endhukoyi Thotamali"	Bhanumathi Ramakrishna	4:32
6	"Evvade Athadevvade"	Bhanumathi Ramakrishna	6:24
7	"Madhura Madhuramee"	A. M. Rajah & P. Bhanumathi	3:25
8	"Aadadhi Ante"	Relangi	2:13
9	"Nanu Vidanadakura"	Bhanumathi Ramakrishna	3:40
10	"Paalinchara Ranga"	A. M. Rajah	3:19
11	"Raa Raa Naa Swamy"	Bhanumathi Ramakrishna	4:16
12	"Ranga Kaaveti Ranga"	A. M. Rajah	1:06
13	"Ranga Rangayani"	Bhanumathi Ramakrishna	1:26
14	"Saavirahe Thava Dheena"	Bhanumathi Ramakrishna	5:12
15	"Thillana"	N. L. Gana Saraswathi	2:57
16	"Yela Naapai Dhaya Choopavu"	Bhanumathi Ramakrishna	3:57
17	"Baddenajali"	Bhanumathi Ramakrishna	1:10

== Legend ==
The story revolves around a Brahmin who makes flower garlands. He devotes his life to Lord. He is seduced by a woman who is determined to make him break his vow.

=== 1937 film ===
Vipra Narayana was made in Telugu language for the first time in 1937 by Aurora Pictures. It stars Kasturi Narasimha Rao, Kanchanamala and Tanguturi Suryakumari, and was directed by Ahindra Chaudhari.

It was made in Tamil too with Rajamadam G. Sundara Bhagavathar featuring as Vipra Narayana. The film was produced by Sri Gopalakrishna Films at Madras Sound Studios and was directed by K. Ranga Rao. T. Suryakumari featured as Andal in the film.

=== 1938 film ===
Vipra Narayana was made in the Tamil language again in 1938 by Srinivas Cinetone. It stars Kothamangalam Cheenu and T. V. Rajasundari, the film was produced and directed by A. Narayanan. Meena Narayanan did the audiography.

=== 1954 film ===
Vipra Narayana was made in both Telugu and Tamil, directed and produced by P. S. Ramakrishna Rao and P. Bhanumathi of Bharani Pictures. The title role was played by A. Nageswara Rao. S. D. Sundharam wrote the dialogues and lyrics for the Tamil version.

== Awards ==
- The film won National Film Award for Best Feature Film in Telugu - Certificate of merit in 1954 at 2nd National Film Awards
