= P. Bhanumathi =

Indian actress, singer, director, composer (1925–2005)

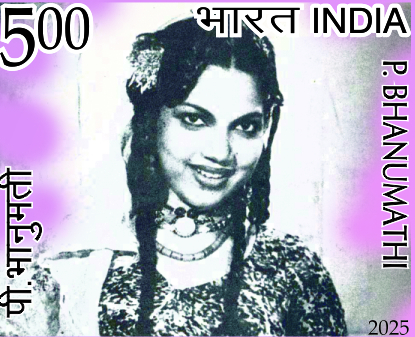
- Portrait of Bhanumathi from a commemorative stamp
- Born: 7 September 1925; Doddavaram, Madras Presidency, British India (now Andhra Pradesh, India)
- Died: 24 December 2005 (aged 80); Chennai, Tamil Nadu, India
- Occupations: Actress; Singer; Writer; Director; Music Director; Producer; Editor; Studio Owner
- Works: Films; songs
- Spouse: P. S. Ramakrishna Rao
- Children: 1
- Honours: Padma Bhushan (2001); Padma Shri (1966); Kalaimamani (1983); Honorary doctorate

P. Bhanumathi Ramakrishna (7 September 1925 – 24 December 2005) was an Indian actress, singer, film producer, director, music composer, writer, editor, studio owner and novelist. She is regarded as the first female superstar of Telugu cinema, and the first female director of Telugu cinema with her debut directorial Chandirani (1953). Bhanumathi appeared in over 100 films, predominantly in Telugu and Tamil languages. She also acted in a few Hindi and Kannada films. She was awarded the Padma Bhushan in 2001 for her contribution to the Indian cinema. She was honored among "Women in Cinema" at the 30th International Film Festival of India.

== Early life ==
Bhanumathi was born on 7 September 1925 in Doddavaram village of Prakasam district, near Ongole, Andhra Pradesh. She was the third child to Bommaraju Saraswathamma, Venkata Subbayya - 6000 Niyogi Brahmin. She grew up watching her father perform in various stage shows. Bhanumathi's father, Venkata Subbayya, was a lover of classical music and trained her in music from an early age. Though her father wanted her to be a great singer, fate had other plans. She became a wildly successful actress and ruled the cinema industry.

== Career ==
Bhanumathi entered the film industry in 1939. After marriage, she quit acting and became a homemaker. B.N. Reddy convinced her to act in the 1945 film Swargaseema, which was turning point in her life. "She also shone as a singer, writer, director, music director, composer, producer, studio owner and editor". She is famous for being paid more than the male contemporaries of her time. She also sang two songs in English: "When I was just a little girl" in Thodu Needa and "Let me try" from Pathu Maadha Bandham. She acted in over 100 films in Telugu, Tamil and Hindi. She is regarded as the first female superstar of Telugu cinema. Bhanumathi was active in the film industry for six decades.

=== Film career ===
She made her debut in Telugu cinema in 1939 as Kalindi in Vara Vikrayam directed by C. Pullayya. Her first popular film was Krishna Prema. Her next popular film was Swargaseema, a milestone film in her career. In Swargaseema, she played the role with negative shades. Oho Pavurama song (sung by her) in Swargaseema became a super hit and she was showered with offers. She later acted in many movies such as Chakrapani, Laila Majnu, Vipranarayana, Malliswari, Batasari and Antastulu. Her first film in Tamil was 1948 Raja Mukthi Pairing to MGR. The duo paired as the second hero and heroine. With MGR, she acted in films that included Malaikallan, Madurai Veeran, Thaikkupin Tharam, Alibabavum 40 Thirudargalum, and Nadodi Mannan. She also acted in films including Kalvanin Kadhali, Makkalaipetra Magarasi, Ambigapathy, Manamagan Thevai, Arivali, Rani Lalithangi with Sivaji Ganesan.

In 1953, she made her directorial debut with Chandirani (made simultaneously in Tamil, Telugu and Hindi). She also directed films like Ippadiyum Oru Penn. Additionally, she directed Bhakta Dhruva Markandeya, an all-children film featuring a cast under 16 years of age, a notable person who acted in this film is Shobana. Bhanumathi also worked as Music director for few films. Her last film was made in 1998, entitled Pelli Kanuka.

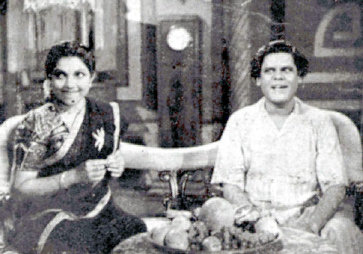
Bhanumathi and N. S. Krishnan in the film Nallathambi 1949

In her film career, Bhanumathi worked alongside five future Chief Ministers: writers C.N. Annadurai (Tamil Nadu) and M. Karunanidhi (Tamil Nadu), co-stars MGR (Tamil Nadu), NTR (Andhra Pradesh) and V.N.Janaki (Tamil Nadu).

C. N. Annadurai gave her a title "Nadippukku Ilakkanam" (Tamil: நடிப்புக்கு இலக்கணம்) (Grammar for acting) after seeing her performance in Rangoon Radha film, that suits her aptly. In a Telugu interview, she also proudly stated that C.N.Annadurai conferred upon her the title Nadippukku Ilakkanam. She is called as "Ashtavadhani" by Tamil people.

She was revered by many actors she had worked with like N. T. Rama Rao, Sivaji Ganesan, M. G. Ramachandran, Akkineni Nageswara Rao, Nagarjuna, Balakrishna, Chiranjeevi, Pawan Kalyan, Venkatesh for her bold and prolific versatility. One of her memorable movies in Tamil was Annai, in the year 1962 directed by Krishnan–Panju, where her acting was appreciated by all and also got the National Award for the film and for also performances in movies Antastulu and Palnati Yuddham, she received National Awards (Rashtrapati Award).

The film Alibabavum 40 Thirudargalum, starring MGR and Bhanumathi made history in Tamil cinema by being the 'First Tamil Film' to be entirely shot and released in Gevacolor. It was also the first full-length colour film released in South India. MGR and Bhanumathi also acted in the film Kalai Arasi, a Tamil movie released in 1963. It is considered the 'First Indian Film' to feature 'Aliens' visiting Earth.

Her rivalry with MGR in Nadodi Mannan gave B. Sarojadevi a breakthrough. (MGR changed the script. Bhanumathi's character the revolutionary Madhana, was written out by being killed off early. Sarojadevi then carried the film as the lead heroine, Princess Ratna).

Bhanumathi's rift with Aluri Chakrapani in Missamma gave Savitri a breakthrough, she left her role in Missamma movie (Initially Bhanumathi was shot for some scenes in the movie before being replaced by Savitri ) but after the release of the movie she watched and commented that "she lost a wonderful role but industry gained a talented actress like savitri" which showed her sportiveness and encouragement towards new actors.

Due to clash with Aluri Chakrapani, she produced a satirical movie on him titled Chakrapani which was a hit and became a classic in Tollywood for this movie she also worked as music director.

For the movie Antastulu (1964), VB Rajendra Prasad had approached Bhanumathi for the role of ANR's sister. She liked the subject and agreed to do the film immediately. The crew booked a room in "Ritz-Carlton" in Hyderabad and she did not want to waste money, so she offered to stay at Sarathi Studios, which had an open area and snakes. The next morning she woke up with her nails bitten by rats. The director decided to cancel the shoot, VB Rajendra Prasad rushed to see Bhanumathi applying iodine casually on the nails and asking when she could start work. While continuing with the shooting, she said, "If you cancel shoot for small things how will I be a Bhanumathi (which means 'shining like the sun' in Sanskrit)."

India's First Vice-President Sarvepalli Radhakrishnan was a fan of her work. Telugu cinema Veterans like Jamuna, Savitri and so many actresses cited her as an inspiration for entering into movies. She is widely recalled by her close associates as 'Epitome of Self-Respect' and 'Versatility'. People in the film industry call her 'high-spirited' and a woman who tried to get what she wanted and often 'succeeded'. Their assessment was correct. She is Multi-talented person. She is the only Female Film Studio Owner in our country.

Despite being eight years younger than MGR, Bhanumathi was the only person in cine industry who 'publicly' addressed MGR as Mr.Ramachandran, even though fellow actors were apprehensive about interacting with MGR. Despite Bhanumathi calling MGR by name, he continued to treat her with utmost respect. He always called her as 'Bhanumathi Amma'

MGR and Bhanumathi were a hit screen pair in the Tamil film industry of that era. During filming with MGR, she predicted he would achieve greatness beyond cinema. After he became Chief Minister, MGR recalled her prophecy and gave her credit.

Despite their rivalry on the set of Nadodi Mannan, they maintained mutual respect. Years later, after becoming Chief Minister, MGR appointed her as director and principal of the Government Music College in 1985. NTR appointed her along with Rajinikanth and Rajkumar as a trustee of Thirupathi Devasthan Committee.

Bhanumathi stated that She is regardered as an arrogant and troublesome artist. Before signing any film she would put the condition that she would not allow "indecency" or closeness with the hero in love scenes or any other scene. So, the producers, directors and actors always remained at a distance."

When a reporter asked Bhanumathi about her experience acting with NTR and ANR, she responded by saying, "Ask them how the experience of acting with Bhanumathi was." When she was asked who she thought was her heir among the next generation of actresses, she replied stating there cannot be a "Successor" to Bhanumathi. In those days many famous film actresses were giving advertisements for Lux soap. Though Bhanumathi too was offered money she declined to give their advertisements saying she does not use their soap and therefore she cannot promote their soap asking the people to use that soap.

In later years, she continued to act in pivotal roles in many hit movies like Tatamma Kala, Mangammagari Manavadu, Gadasari Atta Sogasari Kodallu, Muddula Manavaralu, Bamma Maata Bangaru Baata, Peddarikam and Pelli Kanuka.

In Malliswari, Chakrapani, Chandirani, Vipranarayana she played romantic, fun loving and playful characters. She is first south Indian actress to receive Padma Awards.

During her later years, she served on various movie related organizations. She was a Member of State Film Awards Committee for two years. She was also a visiting professor at the Film Institute for one year. She was Member of Children Film Society for five years, from 1965 to 1970.

In India, she was the first and only woman to have owned a film studio and the first to act in a dual role and the first woman to have directed a movie simultaneously in three languages.

On occasion of World Women's day, Sakshi Sunday magazine listed the most successful women from every industry and she was listed in the one for those from the movie industry. It was also added that the present highly successful heroines could not reach the heights Bhanumathi reached and that it is an 'impossible' task for anyone to reach her level of 'success'.

=== Songs ===
She was adept in both Carnatic and Hindustani music. She gave voice to her songs despite it being the norm to use playback singers for actors. Some of her songs are still popular like Manasuna mallela, Pilichina biguvatara,Oh baatasaari, Kila Kila Navvulu, Oh Pavurama, Preme Neramauna, Srikara karunaalavaala, Sharanam nee divya charanam and many more in Telugu; and Azhagaana Ponnu Naan, Vaarai Inbam Thaaraai, Nilaa Nilaa Odi Vaa, Thalai Vaari Poochoodi Unnai, Kannile Iruppathenna and Annai Enbadhu Neethaanaa in Tamil. She also provided music to a lot of her films. She has sung approximately 300 songs in Tamil, Telugu, and Hindi movies in which she acted.

Bhanumathi has privately recorded Purandaradasa’' bhajans. In 1953 when Andhra Pradesh state was formed from the Madras province she recorded a song along with Balantrapu Rajaneekantha Rao (who wrote the lyrics and composed music) “pasidi merungula talatalalu “for All India Radio, Vijayawada. She was the first singer to sing thyagaraya kruti in Telugu films with the song, “Palukavemi Naa Daivama” in her first film Varavikrayam (1939). She made a point to sing one Carnatic song in all her films produced under her home production Bharani Studios.

=== Literary Career ===
Bhanumathi was also a talented writer with a number of short stories to her credit. Her Autobiography 'Nalo Nenu' was published in Telugu and later, released in English as Musings. Andhra Pradesh Sahitya Academy awarded her as the best short story writer for her popular short stories 'Attagari Kathalu'. Bhanumathi stated that her literary works are close to her heart. She was a member of Lalit Kala Academy for five years, and Sahitya Academy Andhra Pradesh for 10 years. She served as Director and Principal of the Tamil Nadu Government Music College. She got an honorary doctorate degree in 1975 from the Andhra University.

=== Philanthropy ===
She was an eminent social worker who was closely associated with a number of Social Service Organizations. She was the founder member and treasurer of Madras branch of Altrusa International Inc., Chicago for lifelong starting from 1963. She was a life member of the 'Red Cross Society'. She established an educational institution named as 'Dr. Bhanumathi Ramakrishna Matriculation School' at Saligramam, Chennai providing free education to the poor.

== Personal life ==
Bhanumathi married film director P. S. Ramakrishna Rao in 1943. They had one son. She died in 2005 in Chennai.

== Awards ==
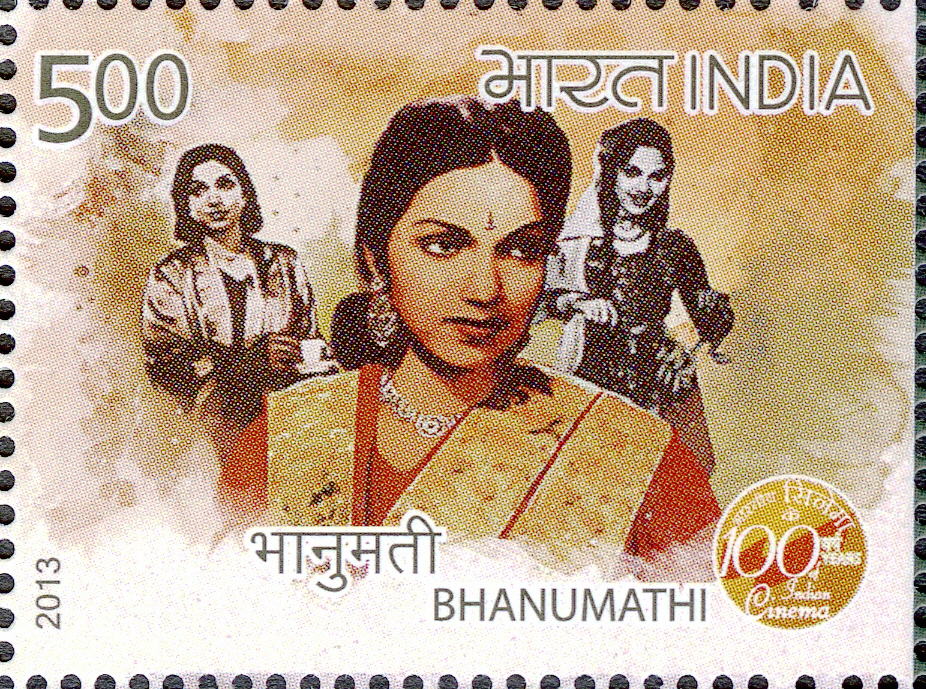
Bhanumathi on 2013 stamp of India

Civilian honors

- Padma Bhushan in 2001
- Padma Shri in 1966

Rashtrapati Award in acting

- Annai in 1962
- Antastulu in 1965
- Palnati Yuddham in 1966

National Film Awards

- National Film Award for Best Writer for the Book "Naalo Nenu" an autobiography in 1993.

Filmfare Awards South

- Filmfare Outstanding contributions to South Indian Cinema (1988)

Nandi Awards

- Raghupathi Venkaiah Award, from the Government of Andhra Pradesh, in 1985
- Nandi Award for Best Director in 1986
- NTR National Award, from the Government of Andhra Pradesh, in 2000

Tamil Nadu State Film Awards

- Tamil Nadu State Film Honorary Award – "Arignar Anna Award" in 1992

State Awards

- Kalaimamani (connoisseur of arts), Government of Tamil Nadu, in 1983

Other honors

- Kalaprapoorna, Andhra University, Visakhapatnam, in 1975
- Honorary Doctorate, Sri Venkateswara University, Tirupathi, in 1984
- Raja-Lakshmi Award for the year 1998 from Sri Raja-Lakshmi Foundation, Chennai
- C.N.Annadurai honoured her with a title "Nadippukku Ilakkanam" for her remarkable performance in "Rangoon Radha"
- She was one of the dignitaries been honored by Andhra Pradesh government at the time of state formation in 1956.
- The 56th International Film Festival of India taking place from 20 to 28 November 2025, will celebrate centenary and pay tribute to P. Bhanumathi by screening her classic films.

== Interview ==
National Film Archive of India Interview of one of the first female superstars of Telugu Cinema P. Bhanumathi by Randor Guy Shivaji about Bhanumathi. Bhanumathi about C.N. Annadurai MGR complimented Jayalalithaa by comparing her to Bhanumathi.

== See also ==
- Raghupathi Venkaiah Award
