= Prasad Art Pictures =

Indian film production company

- Industry: Media
- Founded: 1953
- Key people: A. V. Subba Rao
- Products: Movies

Prasad Art Pictures Private Limited is a movie production house in South India. They produced about 20 films, mostly in Telugu. The company was headed by Anumolu Venkata Subba Rao. Their first film was Pempudu Koduku (1953), directed by L. V. Prasad. Illarikam, directed by T. Prakash Rao, was their biggest hit of 1959. Other notable films include Bharya Bharthalu (1961), Brahmachari (1968), and Aalu Magalu (1977).

Year	Film	Director	Cast
1953	Pempudu Koduku	L. V. Prasad	Sivaji Ganesan, Pushpavalli
1959	Illarikam	T. Prakash Rao	Akkineni Nageswara Rao, Jamuna
1961	Bharya Bharthalu	Pratyagatma	Akkineni Nageswara Rao, Krishna Kumari
1962	Kulagothralu	Pratyagatma	Akkineni Nageswara Rao, Krishna Kumari
1963	Punarjanma	Pratyagatma	Akkineni Nageswara Rao, Krishna Kumari
1965	Manushulu Mamathalu	Pratyagatma	Akkineni Nageswara Rao, Savitri
1966	Navaratri	T. Rama Rao	Akkineni Nageswara Rao, Savitri
1966	Kalithozhan	M. Krishnan Nair	Prem Nazir, Sheela
1968	Brahmachari	T. Rama Rao	Akkineni Nageswara Rao, Jayalalitha
1969	Aadarsa Kutumbam	Pratyagatma	Akkineni Nageswara Rao, Jayalalitha
1972	Bharya Biddalu	T. Rama Rao	Akkineni Nageswara Rao, Jayalalitha, Krishna Kumari
1973	Palletoori Bava	Pratyagatma	Akkineni Nageswara Rao, Lakshmi
1976	Alludocchadu	Pratyagatma	Raja Babu, Jayasudha
1977	Aalu Magalu	T. Rama Rao	Akkineni Nageswara Rao, Vanisri
1977	Ardhangi	A. Mohan Gandhi	Muralimohan, Jayasudha
1977	Attavarillu	Pratyagatma	Narasimha Raju, Prabha
1979	Anthuleni Vintha Katha		Narasimha Raju, Madhavi Mohandas
1979	Kamalamma Kamatam	Pratyagatma	Krishnam Raju, Pallavi
1980	Judaai	T. Rama Rao	Jeetendra, Rekha
1980	Nayakudu Vinayakudu	Pratyagatma	Akkineni Nageswara Rao, Jayalalitha
1982	Jeevan Dhaara	T. Rama Rao	Rekha, Raj Babbar, Amol Palekar
1982	Main Intequam Loonga	T. Rama Rao	Dharmendra, Reena Roy
1987	President Gari Abbai	T. Rama Rao	Nandamuri Balakrishna, Suhasini
1991	Talli Tandrulu	T. Rama Rao	Nandamuri Balakrishna, Vijaya Shanti
1992	Golmaal Govindam	T. Rama Rao	Rajendra Prasad, Anusha
1994	Police Brothers	A. Mohan Gandhi	Vinod Kumar, Roja
