= Nandi Awards of 1966 =

Indian Telugu film and TV awards ceremony

The Nandi Awards were presented annually by the Government of Andhra Pradesh to recognise excellence in Telugu cinema, theatre, and television. The first awards were given in 1964. The following films were honoured in 1966.

== 1966 Nandi Awards Winners List ==
Category	Winner	Film
Best Feature Film	B. N. Reddy	Rangula Ratnam
Second Best Feature Film	K. Pratyagatma	Chilaka Gorinka
Third Best Feature Film	V. Madhusudhana Rao	Aastiparulu
