= Tatineni =

Tatineni (Telugu: తాతినేని) is a Telugu surname:

- Tatineni Chalapati Rao, famous Music Director of Telugu cinema.
- Tatineni Prakash Rao, famous Director of Telugu cinema.
- Tatineni Rama Rao, famous Director of Telugu cinema.
