= Manju Bhargavi =

Indian actress

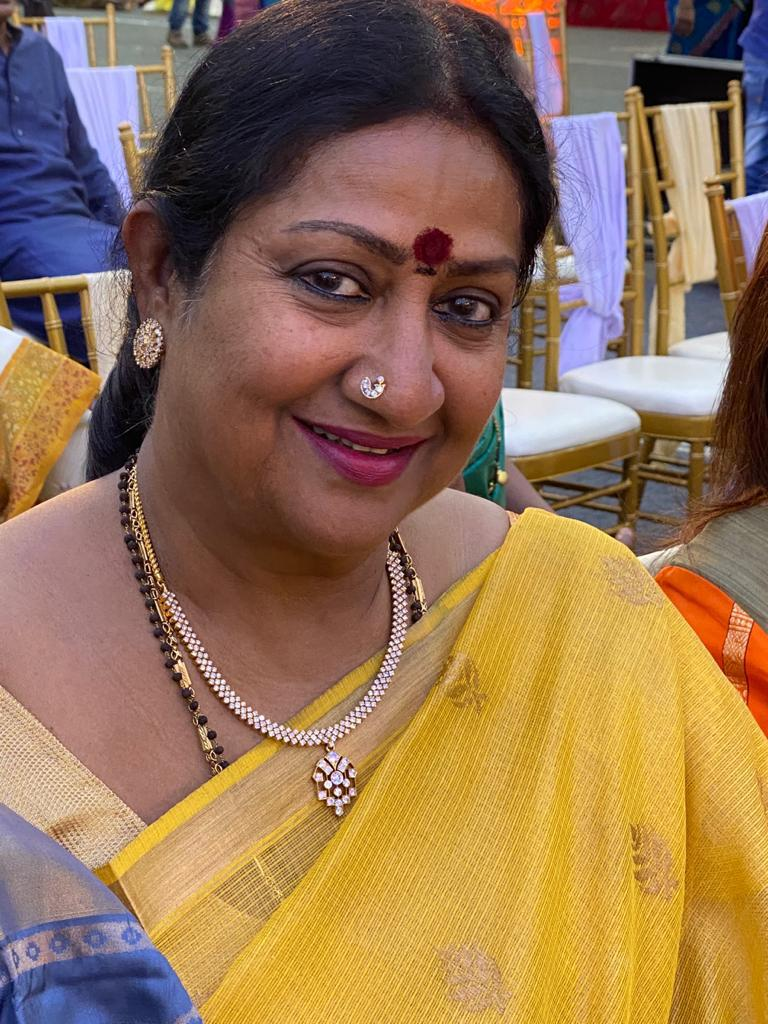
- Born: Manju Bhargavi; Andhra Pradesh, India
- Website: www.manjubarggavee.com

Manju Bhargavi is an actress and dancer, best known for her performance in the Telugu blockbusters, Nayakudu Vinayakudu and Sankarabharanam, which were both released on consecutive days in the beginning of February 1980.

== Early life ==
Manju Bhargavi's parents originally hailed from Andhra Pradesh but settled in Madras. After marriage she settled in Bengaluru.

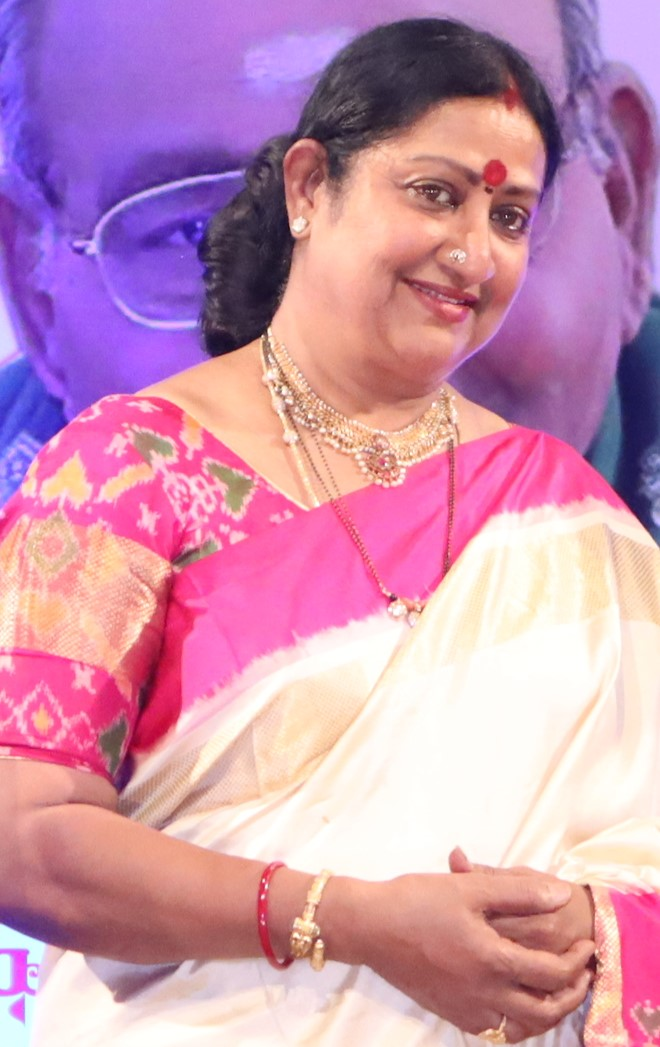
Manju Bhargavi

== Career ==
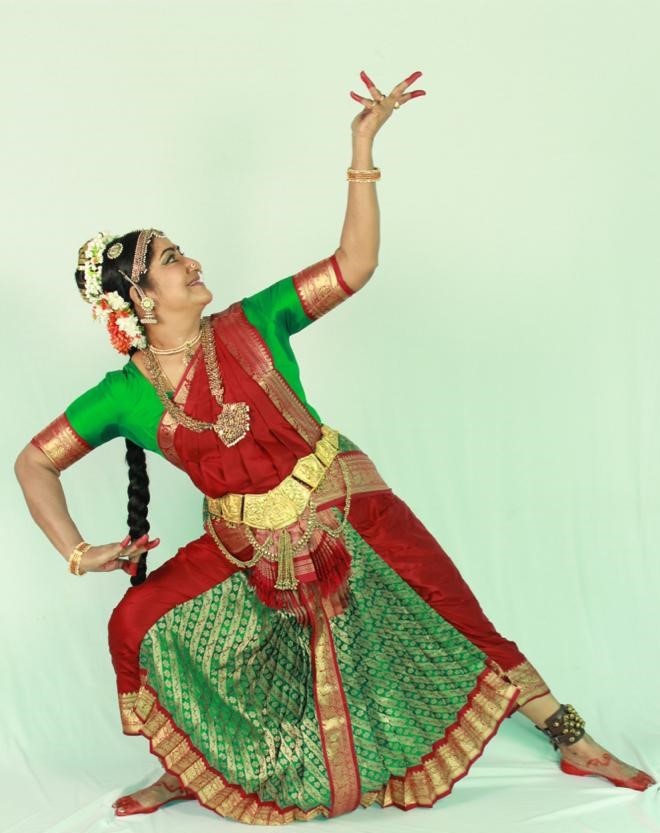
Kuchipudi dance performance by Manju Bhargavi

She was trained as a classical dancer and performed at many dance shows. At one of these shows, filmmaker Prakash Rao saw her and cast her in a dance sequence for the Telugu film Gaalipataalu (1974). It led to dance numbers in the hit films Krishnaveni (1974), Soggadu (1975) and Yamagola (1977). She was also seen as a vamp in Nayakudu Vinayakudu opposite ANR and Jayalalithaa. She was then cast in the film President Peramma where she performed a dance number, and then the film's director K. Vishwanath asked her to submit some photographs where she wasn't wearing any make-up. She complied and he liked the results and cast her in the lead role as an unglamorous dancer in his next film Sankarabharanam (1979), a film that broke box office records and became a landmark in Telugu cinema. Besides the dubbed version of Sankarabharanam, she has acted in some landmark Malayalam movies too. She has done a Tamil movie song in BILLA in 1980 as well as a cameo in the famous classical dance sequence with Kamal Haasan in the movie Saagara Sangamam in 1983. Although she was very satisfied with the film as it gave her fame and respect, she didn't get many roles in films after that, her height being the reason, but she chose to concentrate on her dance programs and running the dance school. One of her disciples is Deepa Sashindran.

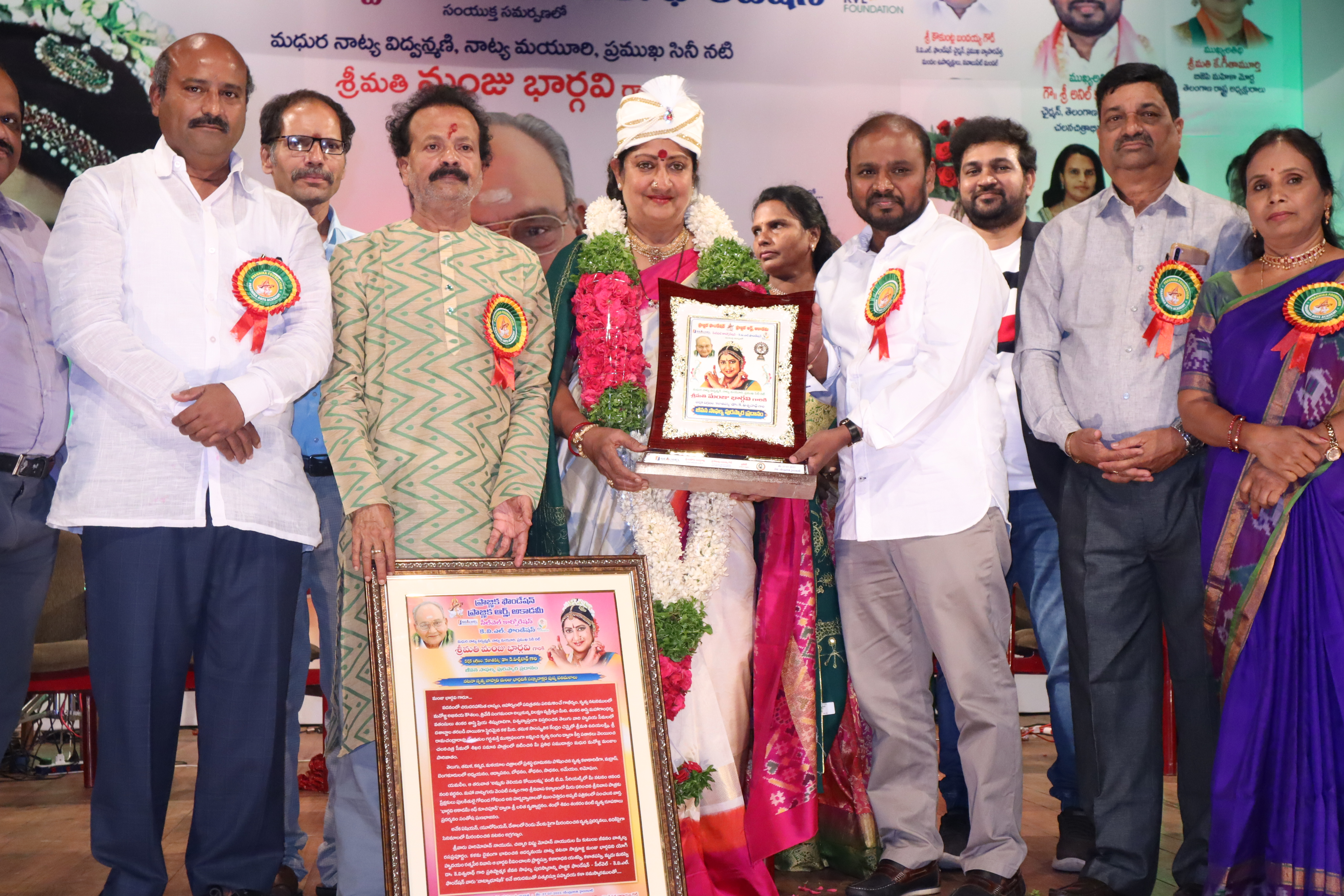
Manju Bhargavi felicitaed by FDC Chairman Anil Kurmachalam in Ravindrabharathi in a private event

== Family ==
Her husband is the son of a retired IAS officer Vengopal Naidu. His family is also originally from Andhra Pradesh but later settled in Bangalore, which is where she currently lives. She had two sons, but one of her sons died of cancer in 2007. She runs a dance school in Bangalore, and because of that and her dance shows, she doesn't have much time to act in films, taking an occasional role when it fits into her busy schedule. In 2008, she made her Kannada film debut in Hatrick Hodi Maga playing Shivaraj Kumar's mother.

She acted as Subbulakshmi in the popular TV serial Thangam on Sun TV.

== Filmography ==
=== Telugu ===
1. Devi Lalithamba (1973)
2. Gaalipataalu (1974)
3. Krishnaveni (1974)
4. Chaduvu Samskaram (1974)
5. Yashoda Krishna (1975)
6. Soggadu (1976)
7. Yamagola (1977)
8. Sahasavanthudu (1978)
9. Anthuleni Vintha Katha (1979) as Lavanya
10. Gandharva Kanya (1979) as Chatura
11. Sri Tirupati Venkateswara Kalyanam (1979)
12. Kothala Raayudu (1979) as Lily
13. President Peramma (1979)
14. Sankarabharanam (1980)
15. Kodallu Vastunnaru Jagratha (1980)
16. Nayakudu Vinayakudu (1980)
17. Patalam Pandu (1981)
18. Amrutha Kalasham (1981)
19. Prema Simhasanam (1981)
20. Bala Nagamma (1982)
21. Sagara Sangamam (1983)
22. Yamaleela (1994)
23. Mummy Mee Aayanochadu (1996)
24. Jabilamma Pelli (1996)
25. Ninne Pelladata (1996)
26. Pournami (2006) as Pournami and Chandrakala's stepmother
27. Bhageerathudu (2010)
28. Shakti (2011)
29. Kshetram (2011)
30. Attack (2016)
31. LAW : Love and War (2018)
32. Guna 369 (2019)
33. Angulika (2021)

=== Malayalam ===
1. Devi Kanyakumari (1974)
2. Pulivalu (1975)
3. Njavalppazhangal (1976)
4. Saritha (1977)
5. Sathrathil Oru Raathri (1978)

=== Tamil ===
1. Tripura Sundari (1978)
2. Gandharva Kanni (1979)
3. Devi Dharisanam (1980)
4. Yamanukku Yaman (1980)
5. Billa (1980)
6. Bala Nagamma (1981)
7. Mamiyara Marumagala (1982)
8. Magane Magane (1982)
9. Sringaram (2007)

=== Kannada ===
1. Hatrick Hodi Maga (2009)

=== Hindi ===
1. Rani Aur Lalpari (1975)
2. Lok Parlok (1979)

== Television ==
=== Telugu ===
- Yamaleela - Aa Taruvatha (2020–2022)
- Ammaku Teliyani Koilamma (2021)

=== Tamil ===
- Thangam (2009-2013)
- Ganga (2018)
