= Kalithozhan =

- Directed by: M. Krishnan Nair
- Written by: Sadasivabrahmam; P. Karamchandran (dialogues)
- Based on: Illarikam (Telugu)(1959) by T. Prakash Rao
- Produced by: A. V. Subbarao
- Starring: Prem Nazir; Sheela; Sukumari; Adoor Bhasi
- Music by: G. Devarajan
- Production company: Prasad Art Pictures
- Distributed by: Prasad Art Pictures
- Release date: 11 February 1966
- Country: India
- Language: Malayalam

Kalithozhan ( Friend) is a 1966 Indian Malayalam film, directed by M. Krishnan Nair and produced by A. V. Subbarao and L.V Prasad. The film stars Prem Nazir, Sheela, Sukumari and Adoor Bhasi in the lead roles, with a musical score by G. Devarajan. It was a remake of the 1959 Telugu film Illarikam.

== Cast ==
- Prem Nazir as Venu
- Sheela as Radha
- Sukumari as Mridula
- Adoor Bhasi as Unnithan
- T. S. Muthaiah as Sankara Pilla
- Bahadoor as Shivan
- G. K. Pillai as Raghavan Karthavu
- Philomina as Ponnamma
- Premalatha as Ammayi
- Kottayam Shantha as Kalyaniyamma
- Sumathi as Seetha
- T. K. Balachandran as Raghu

== Soundtrack ==
The music was composed by G. Devarajan and the lyrics were written by P. Bhaskaran.

No.	Song	Singers	Lyrics	Length (m:ss)
1	"Ammaayi Appanu"	A. L. Raghavan	P. Bhaskaran	
2	"Maalika Meloru Mannaathikkili"	S. Janaki, A. M. Rajah, Chorus	P. Bhaskaran	
3	"Manjalayil Mungithorthi"	P. Jayachandran	P. Bhaskaran	
4	"Nandanavaniyil"	S. Janaki, A. M. Rajah	P. Bhaskaran	
5	"Pularee Pularee" (Premanaadakam)	S. Janaki, A. M. Rajah	P. Bhaskaran	
6	"Ragasagara"	L. R. Eeswari	P. Bhaskaran	
7	"Thaarunyam Thannude"	P. Jayachandran	P. Bhaskaran	
8	"Urakkamille" (Maanathu Vennilaavu)	S. Janaki	P. Bhaskaran	
