= Maadi Veettu Mappilai =

1967 film directed by S. K. A. Chari

- Theatrical release poster
- Directed by: S. K. A. Chari
- Screenplay by: A. L. Narayanan (dialogues)
- Story by: Sadasivabrahmam
- Based on: Illarikam (1959)
- Produced by: A. V. Subba Rao
- Starring: Ravichandran; Jayalalithaa
- Cinematography: Annayya
- Edited by: J. Krishnaswamy
- Music by: T. Chalapathi Rao
- Production company: Prasad Art Pictures
- Distributed by: Sri Vinayaka Movies
- Release date: 23 June 1967
- Running time: 177 minutes
- Country: India
- Language: Tamil

Maadi Veettu Mappillai (transl. The Son-in-Law who stays on the top floor) is a 1967 Indian Tamil-language comedy film, directed by S. K. A. Chari. A remake of the Telugu film Illarikam (1959), it stars Ravichandran and Jayalalithaa, with Nagesh, Rama Prabha, V. K. Ramasamy, Balaji, Major Sundarrajan, T. S. Muthaiah, Udaya Chandrika and P. K. Saraswathy in supporting roles. The film was released on 23 June 1967.

== Plot ==
Somu studies with the help of his maternal uncle Dharmalingam. He falls in love with the daughter of a Sivagnanam i.e. Meena. He marries her and stays in their house as Veettu Mappilai. Sivagnanam's wife does not like this and insults him indirectly. Her cousin plots to usurp the wealth, by his son Balu who secretly married Seetha. Somu spots Seetha, his presumed to be dead sister while she was performing on stage. Not knowing they are siblings, Meena suspects Somu's fidelity. Balu and his father creates problems between Somu and Meena. How Somu solves all the problems and paves way for a happy family reunion forms the rest of the film.

== Cast ==
- Ravichandran as Somu
- Jayalalithaa as Meena
- Nagesh as Shankaran
- Rama Prabha as Gowri
- V. K. Ramasamy as Dharmalingam
- Balaji as Balu
- Major Sundarrajan as Sivagnanam
- T. S. Muthaiah as Sadatcharam
- Udaya Chandrika as Seetha
- P. K. Saraswathy as Nagamma

== Soundtrack ==
The music was composed by T. Chalapathi Rao.

Song	Singers	Lyrics
"Paaladai Marainthu"	P. Susheela, Vasantha, Jayadev	Kannadasan
"Kettu Paar"	T. M. Soundararajan, P. Susheela	Kannadasan
"Nenjukku Mugame Kannadi"	T. M. Soundararajan, P. Susheela	Kannadasan
"Pagalile Paarkavandadennu"	T. M. Soundararajan, P. Susheela	Kannadasan
"Ennai Manikkavendum"	P. Susheela	Kannadasan
"Maadi Veettu Mappilai"	Darapuram Sundarrjan	Kannadasan
"Giya Giya Massage"	T. M. Soundararajan	Kannadasan

== Release and reception ==
Maadi Veettu Mappilai was released on 23 June 1967, and distributed by Sri Vinayaka Movies. Kalki noted that the film's various flaws were eclipsed by its comedy.

== Bibliography ==
- Cowie, Peter; Elley, Derek, eds. (1977). World Filmography: 1967. Fairleigh Dickinson University Press. ISBN 978-0-498-01565-6.
