= Manushulu Mamathalu =

- Theatrical release poster
- Directed by: K. Pratyagatma
- Written by: Acharya Aatreya (dialogues)
- Screenplay by: K. Pratyagatma
- Story by: Yaddanapudi Sulochana Rani
- Produced by: A. V. Subba Rao
- Starring: Akkineni Nageswara Rao; Savitri; J. Jayalalithaa
- Cinematography: P. S. Selvaraj
- Edited by: J. Krishnaswamy
- Music by: T. Chalapathi Rao
- Production company: Prasad Art Productions
- Distributed by: Navayuga Films
- Release date: 27 August 1965
- Running time: 170 minutes
- Country: India
- Language: Telugu

Manushulu Mamathalu (transl. Human Effections) is a 1965 Indian Telugu-language drama film produced by A. V. Subba Rao under the Prasad Art Productions banner and directed by K. Pratyagatma. It stars Akkineni Nageswara Rao, Savitri and Jayalalithaa, with music composed by T. Chalapathi Rao. T. Rama Rao worked as associate director for this film. This picture is also remembered to be Jayalalithaa's Telugu debut as a leading actress (having previously worked as a child artiste in mostly song sequences). This was the first Telugu film to ever receive an A certificate from the Censor Board.

== Cast ==
- Akkineni Nageswara Rao as Venu
- Savitri as Radha
- Jayalalithaa as Indira
- Jaggayya as Bhaskar
- Gummadi as Raja Rao
- Ramana Reddy as Gopalam
- Prabhakar Reddy as Seshu
- Rajasree as Vani
- Hemalatha as Kanakamma

== Soundtrack ==
The music was composed by T. Chalapathi Rao.

Song	Singers	Lyrics	Length
"Siggestondha Siggestondha"	Ghantasala Venkateswara Rao, Susheela	C. Narayana Reddy	04:05
"Nee Kaliki"	Jayadev, Janaki	Dasarathi	05:16
"Neevu Eduruga Unnavu"	Ghantasala Venkateswara Rao, Susheela	C. Narayana Reddy	04:22
"Okaru Kavali"	Janaki	Kosaraju Raghavaiah Chowdary	02:46
"Vennelalo Malliyallu"	Susheela	Dasarathi	03:14
"Nenu Tagaledu"	Ghantasala Venkateswara Rao	Dasarathi	03:25
"Kannu Moosindhiledhu"	Susheela	Dasarathi	04:01
"Ninnu Choodani"	Susheela	Dasarathi	03:47
"Ontariga Vunnavante"	Susheela	Atreya	02:21

== Release ==
The film received an A certificate by the censor board due to the song sequence featuring Jayalalitha in a swimsuit and the sequence of wife giving alcohol to husband, marking the first Telugu film to receive an A certificate.

== Accolades ==
The film won the National Film Award for Best Feature Film in Telugu.
