= Deepa =

Hindu female name

- Gender: Unisex (traditionally Female)
- Language: Sanskrit

Origin
- Meaning: "lamp" "light"
- Region of origin: India

Other names
- Alternative spelling: Dipa

Deepa or Dipa (Sanskrit: दिपा, romanized: Dīpa) is a Hindu name of Sanskrit origin. In India, it is a popular feminine given name, meaning "lamp" and "light".

== Notable people named Deepa ==
- Deepa Bhaskar, Indian actress
- Deepa Bhatia, Indian film editor
- Deepa Chari, Indian actress and model
- Deepa Dasmunsi (born 1960), Indian politician and member of the 15th Lok Sabha
- Deepa Fernandes, Indian-American journalist and radio host
- Deepa Gahlot, Indian critic and writer
- Deepa Jayakumar (born 1974), Indian politician
- Deepa Kaul (born 1944), Indian politician and social worker
- Deepa Malik (born 1970), Indian athlete
- Deepa Marathe (born 1972), Indian cricketer
- Deepa Mehta (born 1950), Canadian-Indian director and screenwriter
- Deepa Miriam (born 1981), Indian singer
- Deepa M. Ollapally, American political scientist
- Deepa Shree Niraula (born 1975), Nepalese actress
- Deepa Parab (born 1981), Indian actress and entertainer
- Deepa Sahi (born 1965), Indian actress and producer
- Deepa Sannidhi (born 1990), Indian actress
- Deepa Sashindran (born 1974), Indian choreographer and dancer
- Deepa Venkat, Indian actress in Tamil films and television
- Deepa, stage name of Unni Mary in Tamil films

== Notable people named Dipa ==
- Dipa Nusantara Aidit (1923–1965), Indonesian politician
- Dipa Karmakar (born 1993), Indian gymnast
- Dipa Khondokar, Bangladeshi actress
- Dipa Ma (1911–1989), Indian meditation teacher
- Dipa Shah, Indian actress

== See also ==
- Depa, construction and manufacturing firm based in Dubai, UAE
- DEPA, Greek natural gas company
- Depa Billaba, fictional Jedi Master in the Star Wars universe
