= Muqabla (1993 film) =

- Film poster
- मुकाबला
- Directed by: T. Rama Rao
- Written by: Anees Bazmee (dialogues)
- Story by: P. Krishna Murali
- Based on: Police Brothers by Posani Krishna Murali
- Produced by: A. V. Subbarao
- Starring: Aditya Pancholi; Govinda; Farah Naaz; Karisma Kapoor; Paresh Rawal
- Cinematography: Prasadbabu
- Edited by: J. Krishnaswamy; T. V. Balasubramaniam
- Music by: Dilip Sen-Sameer Sen
- Production company: Prasad Art Productions
- Release date: 14 May 1993
- Country: India
- Language: Hindi

Muqabla is 1993 Hindi-language film directed by T. Rama Rao, starring Aditya Pancholi, Govinda, Karishma Kapoor and Paresh Rawal. Other cast includes Shakti Kapoor, Asrani, Aruna Irani and Farah Naaz. It is a remake of the 1992 Telugu film Police Brothers.

== Plot ==
Suraj and Deepak live a poor lifestyle in a village along with their widowed father, who has always taught them to be honest. Both re-locate to the city and find employment with the Police Force, while Suraj is a Havaldar and Deepak is a Traffic Constable. Suraj does his job honestly and diligently and is often reprimanded by Inspector Waghmare.

Then differences arise between Suraj and Deepak when the later comes to testify in favor of an accused, Narendra Khanna, who was arrested by Suraj for killing a man. Things come to a boil when Soni's husband is brutally murdered in broad daylight, and when officers of both Shaitaan Chowki and Kala Chowki refuse to investigate nor even register this homicide, she decides to take matters into her own hands. Her case is then presented in front of the court.

It turns out to be that Narendra Kumar is not a single person but are twins about which the world is unaware. Deepak presents both the twins in front of the court. The judge takes both the twins in judicial custody. After this the problems between the two brothers, i.e. Deepak and Suraj, get resolved. Deepak plans to go to his village with Suraj to surprise their father, he goes out to buy some shawls and is kidnapped by Narendra and his men. They torture him and call Suraj to mock him. As soon as Suraj reaches to Deepak who is heavily injured and Deepak finds a bomb attached to him. Since he doesn't want to get anyone killed Deepak jumps into the waterfall resulting in his death.

After this incident all the hawaldars go rogue and start a mutiny. The hawaldars go on a killing spree along with Suraj. A fight starts between Khanna and Suraj. The fight ends with the death of Khanna by the hands of Suraj.

== Cast ==
- Govinda as Police Constable Suraj
- Aditya Pancholi as Traffic Constable Deepak
- Karishma Kapoor as Karishma
- Farha Naaz as Vandana
- Arun Govil as Police Inspector Constable Satyaprakash
- Tej Sapru as Police Inspector Waghmare at Kalachowki Police Station
- Satyendra Kapoor as Suraj's and Deepak's father
- Aruna Irani as Soni
- Asrani as Khairatlal, Soni's husband
- Paresh Rawal as Communications Minister Jaganath 'Jaggu' Mishra
- Shakti Kapoor as Khanna Saahab
- Vikas Anand as Superintendent of Police Mohan Kapoor
- Y. G. Mahendran as Police Constable Saajan
- Ali as Thief at Kala Chowky Police Station

== Soundtrack ==
All music is composed by Dilip Sen-Sameer Sen on T-Series (company).

| No. | Title | Playback | Length |
|---|---|---|---|
| 1. | "Chal Chaliye Wahan Pe Dil Jani" | Abhijeet, Sonu Nigam |
| 2. | "Dil Tera Hai Diwana" | Anuradha Paudwal, Abhijeet |
| 3. | "Dekho Pyare Rut Kaisi Aayee" | Anuradha Paudwal, Suresh Wadkar |
| 4. | "Ik Ladki Ne Mujhpe Jadu Kiya" | Anuradha Paudwal, Abhijeet, Sonu Nigam |
| 5. | "Jisko Pooja Tha Is Dil Ne" | Anuradha Paudwal |
| 6. | "Khanke Ye Kangna Sun More Sajna" | Anuradha Paudwal |
| 7. | "Chhodo Mujhe Jane Do Mere Sanwariya" | Anuradha Paudwal, Sonu Nigam |
| 8. | "Jane Jana Aaja Na Baahon Mein" | Anuradha Paudwal |
| 9. | "Naino Ko Karne Do Naino Se Baat" | Anuradha Paudwal, Sonu Nigam |
| 10. | "Tere Dil Mein Jo Hai Mere Dil Mein Wo" | Anuradha Paudwal, Vipin Sachdeva |
| 11. | "Tumbak Tu Baba Tumbak Tu" | Alisha Chinai |
| Total length: | | | 57:00 |
