= Ghar Jamai (1992 film) =

Ghar Jamai घर जमाई
- DVD cover
- Directed by: Arun Bhatt
- Written by: K B Pathak
- Based on: Illarikam (Telugu)
- Produced by: B P Shahabadi
- Starring: Mithun Chakraborty; Varsha Usgaonkar; Rita Bhaduri; Vikram Gokhale; Shakti Kapoor
- Cinematography: Vinod Barot
- Music by: Anand–Milind
- Release date: 13 November 1992
- Running time: 140 minutes
- Country: India
- Language: Hindi

Ghar Jamai is a 1992 Indian Hindi-language film directed by Arun Bhatt, starring Mithun Chakraborty, Varsha Usgaonkar, Reeta Bhaduri, Vikram Gokhale, Kader Khan, Amita Nangia and Prem Chopra. The movie is a remake of 1961 Hindi movie Sasural which itself was a remake of 1959 Telugu movie Illarikam.

== Cast ==
• Lalit Gajra (Chief Assistant Director)

- Mithun Chakraborty as Anil
- Varsha Usgaonkar as Mona
- Rita Bhaduri as Nirmala
- Vikram Gokhale as Seth Dwaraka Prasad
- Amita Nangia as Suman
- Prem Chopra as Sadhuram
- Shammi as Sadhuram's wife
- Shakti Kapoor as Ramesh
- Kader Khan as Pyaray Lal
- Anjan Srivastav as Gopaldas
- Paintal as Lakhpathiya
- Sushmita Mukherjee as Prema, Sadhuram's daughter
- Beena Banerjee as Surekha, Seth Dwaraka Prasad's sister
- Neena Gupta as Neena Sharma
- Hussain Khan as All India Karate Champion
- Shail Chaturvedi as Pyaray Lal's father

== Soundtrack ==
#	Title	Singer(s)
1	"Dil Lagake Dekho"	Mohammed Aziz, Sadhana Sargam
2	"Badli Si Chayi Hai"	Udit Narayan, Sadhana Sargam
3	"Dil Lagate Hain" (Female)	Sadhana Sargam
4	"Pyar Karte Hain"	Manhar Udhas, Chandrani Mukherjee
5	"Main Bhi Kisise Pyar Karti Hoon"	Kavita Krishnamurthy
6	"Dil Lagate Hain" (Duet)	Suresh Wadkar, Sadhana Sargam
