= Bharya Biddalu =

- Theatrical release poster
- Directed by: T. Rama Rao
- Written by: Acharya Aatreya (dialogues)
- Screenplay by: T. Rama Rao
- Story by: L. V. Prasad
- Based on: Bratuku Theruvu (1953)
- Produced by: A. V. Subba Rao
- Starring: Akkineni Nageswara Rao; Jayalalithaa
- Cinematography: S. Venkataratnam
- Edited by: J. Krshna Swamy; Balu
- Music by: K. V. Mahadevan
- Production company: Prasad Art Productions
- Distributed by: Navayuga Films
- Release date: 15 January 1972
- Running time: 160 minutes
- Country: India
- Language: Telugu

Bharya Biddalu (transl. Wife and Children) is a 1972 Indian Telugu-language drama film, produced by A. V. Subba Rao under the Prasad Art Productions banner and directed by T. Rama Rao. It stars Akkineni Nageswara Rao, Jayalalithaa and music composed by K. V. Mahadevan. The film is a remake of the Telugu-language film Bratuku Theruvu (1953), also starring Nageswara Rao.

== Cast ==
- Akkineni Nageshwara Rao as Mohan
- Jayalalithaa as Radha
- Krishna Kumari as Susheela
- Gummadi as Raja Rao
- Jaggayya as Dr. Manohar
- Allu Ramalingaiah as Ramanadham
- Raja Babu as Seshu
- P. J. Sarma as Nagabhushanam
- Venkateswara Rao as Ramadasu
- Potti Prasad as Sundaram
- Vivekanand as Krishna
- Suryakantham as Kanaka Durga
- Hemalatha as Jayamma
- Suma as Shanti
- Baby Sridevi as Mohan's little sister
- Master Visweswara Rao

== Soundtrack ==
Music composed by K. V. Mahadevan. Lyrics were written by Acharya Aatreya.

S. No	Song title	Singers	length
1	"Aakulu Pokalu"	Ghantasala, L. R. Eswari	4:17
2	"Bhale Bhale Nacharu"	P. Susheela	3:27
3	"Chal Mohana Ranga"	Ghantasala	3:25
4	"Andamaina Theegaku"	Ghantasala	3:49
5	"Chakkanayya Chandamama" (M)	Ghantasala	1:43
6	"Brathuku Poola Baata Kaadu"	Ghantasala	4:02
7	"Chakkanayya Chandamama" (F)	P. Susheela	3:51
8	"Valachinaanamma"	Ghantasala, P. Susheela	3:34
