= Bachpan =

1970 film

- Poster
- Directed by: Kotayya Pratyagatma
- Written by: Kotayya Pratyagatma; Raj Baldev Raj (Dialogue)
- Produced by: Kotayya Pratyagatma
- Starring: Sanjeev Kumar; Keshto Mukherjee; Mukri; Sachin; Tanuja
- Cinematography: V. Gopi Krishna
- Edited by: Shivaji Avdhut
- Music by: Laxmikant–Pyarelal
- Distributed by: Atma Arts Universal
- Release date: 30 October 1970
- Country: India
- Language: Hindi

Bachpan (transl. Childhood) is a 1970 Indian Hindi-language drama film directed and produced by Kotayya Pratyagatma and written by Raj Baldev Raj. The film stars Sanjeev Kumar and Tanuja. It was inspired by Mark Twain's classic Huckleberry Finn.

== Plot ==
The movie "Bachpan" is about three friends, Ram (Master Sachin), Rahim (Mahboob Master) and Tom (Master Alankar). Ram is an orphan who lives with his aunt; Rahim lives with his father and horse (badshah); Tom lives with his father (Keshto Mukherjee) and mother very unhappily, They love the toyseller Kashi (Sanjeev Kumar) and the flower seller lady Lajjo (Tanuja). Kashi lost his wife and children in an accident and spends his life with their memory. The story takes a turn when the smuggler Nekichand kills his side-kick and innocent Kashi was arrested for the murder. But those three kids were present there. As Kashi was drunk at the time of the murder he cannot recall anything, so he never tries to defend himself. Those three kids try to free their dear Kashi Chacha. Tom's father John fights his case and Ram gives witnesses in his favour. His witness and the evidence help in releasing innocent Kashi. Ram's aunt also comes to the court and admits that Nekichand is the killer of Ram's father and she was trying to guard him as he is her brother. When Ram discovers that Nekichand is his father's killer, he wants to take revenge. Ultimately Nekichand was arrested by the police with the initiative of Ram and Kashi. In the end, Kashi realises that life should go on, and one cannot spend his entire life in the memory of the dead. Hence, he decides to marry Lajjo, who silently loved him from the very beginning.

== Cast ==
- Sanjeev Kumar as Kashi
- Tanuja as Lajwanti
- Sachin Pilgaonkar as Ram
- Junior Mehmood as Rahim
- Master Shahid as Tom
- Keshto Mukherjee as Tom's father
- Tabassum as Lily
- Master Alankar as Suraj
- Mukri as Rahim's father
- Joginder Shelly as Kundan
- Sunder as School Teacher

== Soundtrack ==
Lyrics by Anand Bakshi

Song	Singer
"Ari Muniya Ri Muniya"	Kishore Kumar
"Aaya Re Khilonewala"	Mohammed Rafi
"Balma Ne Hai Hai"	P. Susheela
"O Mother Mary"	Lata Mangeshkar
"Parda Uthnewala Hai"	Lata Mangeshkar
"Prem Ka Rog"	Lata Mangeshkar
