= Palletoori Bava =

- Theatrical release poster
- Directed by: K. Pratyagatma
- Written by: Bhamidipaati Radha Krishna (dialogues)
- Screenplay by: K. Pratyagatma
- Story by: Balamurugan
- Produced by: A. V. Subba Rao
- Starring: Akkineni Nageshwara Rao; Lakshmi
- Cinematography: P. S. Selvaraj
- Edited by: J. Krshna Swamy; Balu
- Music by: T. Chalapathi Rao
- Production company: Prasad Art Productions
- Distributed by: Navayuga Films
- Release date: 11 June 1973
- Running time: 150 mins
- Country: India
- Language: Telugu

Palletoori Bava (transl. Village Brother-in-law) is a 1973 Telugu-language drama film, produced by A. V. Subba Rao under the Prasad Art Productions banner and directed by K. Pratyagatma. It stars Akkineni Nageshwara Rao and Lakshmi, with music composed by T. Chalapathi Rao. The film is a remake of the Tamil film Pattikada Pattanama (1972). The film was remade in Kannada as Putnanja (1995) and in Hindi as Banarasi Babu (1997).

== Cast ==
- Akkineni Nageshwara Rao as Eedukondalu
- Lakshmi as Lalitha
- Chandra Mohan as Madhu
- Nagabhushanam as Bheema Rao
- Relangi as Lawyer Bhajagovindam
- Ramana Reddy as Kotaiah
- Raja Babu as Minor Babu
- Gokina Rama Rao as Edukondalu's uncle
- Mada as butler
- Chitti Babu as rickshaw puller
- Sarathi as Dosakaya
- Rama Prabha as Chittamma
- Shubha as Rangamma
- Sukumari as Deepalakshmi
- Nirmalamma as Edukondalu's grandmother

== Soundtrack ==
Palletoori Bava

Film score by T. Chalapathi Rao
- Released: 1973
- Genre: Soundtrack
- Length: 28:05
- Producer: T. Chalapathi Rao

S. No.	Song title	Lyrics	Singers	length
1	"Osi Vayari Rangi"	C. Narayana Reddy	Ramakrishna	3:59
2	"Hey Bavayya Pilaka Bavayya"	Acharya Aatreya	Ghantasala, P. Susheela	5:12
3	"Muripinche Guvvulara"	Aarudhra	Ghantasala	4:02
4	"Etu Choosina Andame"	Kosaraju	Sharavathi	4:52
5	"Osi Vayari Rangi" (Sad)	C. Narayana Reddy	Ghantasala	4:04
6	"Sarabha Sarabha"	C. Narayana Reddy	S. P. Balasubrahmanyam	2:34
7	"Telivi Okkadi Sommante"	Kosaraju	S. P. Balasubrahmanyam	3:22
