= Ek Nari Ek Brahmachari =

- Poster
- Directed by: K. Pratyagatma
- Written by: P. T. Mukhuram Sharma (dialogues)
- Screenplay by: K. Pratyagatma
- Story by: Balamurugan
- Based on: Brahmachari
- Produced by: P. Gangadhara Rao
- Starring: Jeetendra; Mumtaz
- Cinematography: A. Vincent; A. Venkat
- Edited by: S.P.S. Veerappan
- Music by: Shankar Jaikishan
- Production company: Jothee Navshakthee Combines
- Release date: 19 November 1971
- Running time: 141 minutes
- Country: India
- Language: Hindi

Ek Nari Ek Brahmachari (transl. One Girl, One Bachelor) is a 1971 Indian Hindi-language comedy film, produced by P. Gangadhar Rao Jothee Navshakthee Combines and directed by K. Pratyagatma. It stars Jeetendra and Mumtaz, with music composed by Shankar Jaikishan. The film is a remake of the Telugu film Brahmachari (1968) which itself was based on the 1967 Tamil movie Penne Nee Vaazhga. The 2021 bollywood film Hungama 2 was loosely based on this film.

== Cast ==
- Jeetendra as Mohan Kumar Chaudhary
- Mumtaz as Neena
- Shatrughan Sinha as Raj Kumar Chaudhary
- Aruna Irani as Mala Singh
- Sohrab Modi as Rai Sahib Surajbhan Chaudhary
- Durga Khote as Rajlaxmi Chaudhary
- Mukri as Thakur Chandan Singh
- Jagdeep as Jugal Kishore
- Mohan Choti as Choti
- Keshto Mukherjee as Doctor
- Birbal as College Student
- Polson as College Student
- Brahmachari as Madan
- Mallika as Mumtaz's sister

== Soundtrack ==
Song	Singer
"Are Tu Hai Buddhu Brahmachari"	Kishore Kumar, Manna Dey, Asha Bhosle, Sharda
"Lapa Tosa Nanappa"	Kishore Kumar, Asha Bhosle
"Yeh Pyar To Milan Hai"	Kishore Kumar
"Chirag Kiske Ghar Ka"	Mohammed Rafi
"Aap Ke Peeche"	Sharda
