= Izzat (1968 film) =

1968 Indian Hindi-language film by T. Prakash Rao

Izzat Film
- Poster
- Directed by: T. Prakash Rao
- Screenplay by: Rajinder Singh Bedi
- Story by: Dulal Guha
- Dialogues by: Rajinder Singh Bedi
- Produced by: A. K. Nadiadwala; R. C. Kumar
- Starring: Dharmendra; Tanuja; Jayalalithaa; Balraj Sahni; Mehmood
- Cinematography: D. C. Mehta
- Edited by: Shivaji Awdhut
- Music by: Laxmikant–Pyarelal
- Production company: Pushpa Pictures
- Release date: 1968
- Country: India
- Language: Hindi

Izzat (transl. Honour) is a 1968 Indian Hindi-language drama film directed by T. Prakash Rao. It stars Dharmendra, Tanuja and Jayalalithaa in the lead roles, supported by Balraj Sahni and Mehmood. It was Jayalalithaa's only Bollywood film as a leading actress. The lyrics of the film's songs were penned by Sahir Ludhianvi and the music was provided by Laxmikant–Pyarelal.

== Plot ==
After completing his college, dark-skinned Adivasi Shekhar returns home and finds that his mother, Savli, has died. Distraught, he is consoled by Father Abraham, who also tells him that his mother had an affair with wealthy Ramgarh-based Thakur Pratap Singh, who refused to marry her even after she became pregnant. Enraged by the husband, Shekhar decides to avenge his humiliation and sets forth to expose Pratap. Upon arrival in Ramgarh, he finds that he has a fair-skinned look-alike half-brother, Dilip, as well as a sister, Neelu.

Dilip meets him, hires him as an office staff person, and asks him to impersonate him in order to meet Deepa, the only daughter of wealthy Vinodbabu, and Shekhar agrees to do so. Shekhar meets Deepa and both are attracted to each other. Shekhar decides to tell her the truth about himself, and returns to Ramgarh. Once there, he finds history repeating itself as Dilip is in love with an Adivasi belle, Jhumki, but is refusing to marry her.

== Cast ==
- Dharmendra in a dual role as
  - Shekhar
  - Dilip Singh
- Tanuja as Deepa (Shekhar's girlfriend)
- Jayalalithaa as Jhumki (Dilip's girlfriend)
- Balraj Sahni as Thakur Pratap Singh
- Mehmood as Mahesh
- Laxmi Chhaya as Gangi
- Manmohan Krishna as Father Ibrahim
- Mohan Sherry as Dukal

== Production ==
Izzat was the South Indian actress Jayalalithaa's first and only Hindi film in a full-fledged role, and second Hindi film overall, following a three-minute appearance in Man-Mauji (1962).

== Music and soundtrack ==
The lyrics were penned by Sahir Ludhianvi and the music was composed by Laxmikant–Pyarelal.

Mohammed Rafi's voice was used for Dharmendra and Manna Dey's voice was used for Mehmood in the songs.

#	Song	Singer
1	"Ruk Ja Zara, Kidhar Ko Chala"	Lata Mangeshkar
2	"Jaagi Badan Mein Jwala"	Lata Mangeshkar
3	"Yeh Dil Tum Bin Kahin Lagta Nahin"	Lata Mangeshkar, Mohammed Rafi
4	"Sar Par Lamba Top Leke Aayega"	Asha Bhosle, Mohammed Rafi
5	"Kya Miliye Aise Logon Se"	Mohammed Rafi
6	"Keh Gaye Father Ibrahim"	Manna Dey
7	"Pyar Ki Bukhaar Ko Utaar"	Manna Dey

== Reception ==
The onscreen rapport between Dharmendra and Jayalalithaa received much praise.
