= Seetharatnam Gari Abbayi =

- Directed by: E. V. V. Satyanarayana
- Written by: E. V. V. Satyanarayana
- Produced by: Burugupalli Siva Ramakrishna
- Starring: Vanisri; Vinod Kumar Alva; Roja
- Music by: Raj–Koti
- Release date: 1992
- Country: India
- Language: Telugu

Seetharatnam Gari Abbayi (transl. Madam Seetharatnam’s Son) is a 1992 Indian Telugu-language drama film written and directed by E. V. V. Satyanarayana starring Vanisri, Vinod Kumar Alva and Roja. The film was remade in Kannada as Gruhalakshmi (1992).

== Cast ==
- Vanisri as Sita Ratnam
- Vinod Kumar Alva as Vamsi
- Roja as Manga (Voice Dubbed by Durga)
- Kaikala Satyanarayana as Sita Ratnam's husband
- Brahmanandam as Veterinary doctor Theddu Samaram
- Kota Srinivasa Rao as Garapati Bullabbayi
- Babu Mohan as Sattipandu
- Srikanth
- Nirmalamma
- Ali as compounder
- Jit Mohan Mitra

== Soundtrack ==
All music is composed by Raj–Koti

Track list
No.	Title	Lyrics	Singer(s)	Length
1.	"Meghama Maruvake"	Bhuvana Chandra	S. P. Balasubrahmanyam, K. S. Chithra	6:00
2.	"Mattuga Gammattuga"	Bhuvana Chandra	S. P. Balasubrahmanyam, K. S. Chithra	5:04
3.	"Pasvaado Emito"	Sirivennela Seetharama Sastry	S. P. Balasubrahmanyam	4:24
4.	"Naa Mogude Brahmachari"	Veturi	P. Susheela, Raju, S. P. Sailaja	5:14
5.	"Aa Paapi Kondallo"	Bhuvana Chandra	S. P. Balasubrahmanyam	5:26
Total length:				26:10
