= Nalla Theerpu =

1959 film by T. Prakash Rao

- Theatrical release poster
- Directed by: T. Prakash Rao
- Written by: Murasoli Maran
- Produced by: Sundar Lal Nahatha
- Starring: Gemini Ganesan; Jamuna
- Cinematography: Kamal Ghosh
- Edited by: N. M. Shankar
- Music by: S. M. Subbaiah Naidu
- Production company: Sri Productions
- Distributed by: Rajasri Pictures
- Release date: 9 April 1959
- Running time: 2 hrs. 50 mins
- Country: India
- Language: Tamil

Nalla Theerpu (transl. Excellent Judgement) is a 1959 Indian Tamil-language legal drama film directed by T. Prakash Rao and written by Murasoli Maran. A remake of the 1955 Bengali film Sabar Uparey, the film stars Gemini Ganesan and Jamuna. It was released on 9 April 1963, and emerged a success.

== Plot ==
A man who works in a bank is imprisoned on a charge of murder that he did not commit. He asks his wife to tell the world her husband is dead and asks her to dress like a widow. He requests her to make their son a lawyer so that he can win the case and get him released. The son turns into an efficient lawyer and wins the case, leading to his acquittal.

== Cast ==
Male cast

- Gemini Ganesan
- V. Nagayya
- M. G. Chakrapani
- S. V. Sahasranamam
- T. R. Ramachandran
- T. S. Durairaj

Female cast

- Jamuna
- P. Kannamba
- M. N. Rajam
- Ragini
- Kusalakumari
- M. Saroja

== Production ==
The producer Sundar Lal Nahatha came from Vijayawada to Chennai and set up his own film production company. He produced many films in Tamil, Telugu and Hindi under different banners. This film is one of them produced under the banner Sri Productions.

== Soundtrack ==
Music was composed by S. M. Subbaiah Naidu.

Song	Singer/s	Lyricist	Length
"Azhagaana Maaran Yaaradi"	P. Leela	Ku. Ma. Balasubramaniam	03:18
"Vandu Vandhu Paadaamal"	Jikki	Ku. Ma. Balasubramaniam	03:41
"Velli Odam Pole"	P. Susheela	Ku. Ma. Balasubramaniam	
"Munnariyum Deivamada"	T. M. Soundararajan	Udumalai Narayana Kavi	02:24
"Dheivathaal Aagaadhu Eninum"	T. M. Soundararajan	Udumalai Narayana Kavi	01:18
"Thaayin Mozhi Vazhiye"	T. M. Soundararajan	Udumalai Narayana Kavi	01:08
"Adhu Irundhaa Idhu Ille"	T. M. Soundararajan	Pattukkottai Kalyanasundaram	03:53
"Nithiraiyil Chithira Kanavu"	P. Susheela	Suratha	03:24

== Release and reception ==
Nalla Theerpu was released on 9 April 1959, delayed from March, and fared well at the box office.
