= Bharya Bhartalu =

1961 film directed by Kotayya Pratyagatma

- Theatrical release Poster
- Directed by: K. Pratyagatma
- Written by: Sri Sri; Pitcheswara Rao (dialogues)
- Screenplay by: K. Pratyagatma
- Story by: Dr. K. Tripura Sundari
- Produced by: A. V. Subba Rao
- Starring: Akkineni Nageswara Rao; Krishna Kumari
- Cinematography: C. Nageswara Rao
- Edited by: A. Sanjeevi
- Music by: S. Rajeswara Rao
- Production company: Prasad Art Pictures
- Distributed by: Navayuga Films
- Release date: 31 March 1961
- Running time: 159 minutes
- Country: India
- Language: Telugu

Bharya Bhartalu (transl. Wife and Husband) is a 1961 Indian Telugu-language drama film, produced by A. V. Subba Rao under the Prasad Art Pictures banner and directed by K. Pratyagatma. It stars Akkineni Nageswara Rao and Krishna Kumari, with music composed by S. Rajeswara Rao. The film was adapted from the Tamil novel Pennmanam by Lakshmi Tripurasundari. It was remade in Malayalam as Abhimaanam (1975). The movie was also remade in Tamil as Iruvar Ullam (1963) and in Hindi as Hamrahi (1963) - both of which completed 25 weeks run.

== Cast ==
- Akkineni Nageshwara Rao as Anand
- Krishna Kumari as Sarada
- Relangi as Lawyer Ramanandham
- Ramana Reddy as Sivakamaiah
- Gummadi as Public Prosecutor Dharma Rao
- Padmanabham as Anjaneyulu
- Chadalavada as Kutumbaiah
- Allu Ramalingaiah as Train Passenger
- Suryakantam as Tayaru
- Girija as Hema
- Jayanti as Kamala
- Sandhya as Kanakam
- Nirmalamma as Manikyamma
- Kusalakumari special appearance in the song "Ranga rangeli"
- Hemalatha

== Soundtrack ==
Bharya Bhartalu

Film score by S. Rajeswara Rao
- Released: 1961
- Genre: Soundtrack
- Length: 24:21
- Producer: S. Rajeswara Rao

Music composed by S. Rajeswara Rao. Music released on His Master's Voice.

S. No	Song title	Lyrics	Singers	length
1	"Jooruga Hoosharuga"	Sri Sri	Ghantasala	4:09
2	"O Sukumara"	Sri Sri	Ghantasala, P. Susheela	3:57
3	"Madhuram Madhuram"	Sri Sri	Ghantasala, P. Susheela	4:29
4	"Emani Padedano Eevela"	Sri Sri	P. Susheela	2:53
5	"Ranga Rangeli"	Arudra	P. Susheela	2:52
6	"Choosi Choosi Kallu"	Kosaraju	Ghantasala, Jikki	3:04
7	"Kanakamma"	Kosaraju	Madhavapeddi Satyam, Swarnalata	2:57

== Awards ==
The film won National Film Award for Best Feature Film in Telugu in 1962 at 9th National Film Awards.
