= Lok Parlok =

1979 Indian film by T. Rama Rao

- Theatrical release poster
- Directed by: T. Rama Rao
- Written by: Charandas Shokh(dialogues)
- Screenplay by: T. Rama Rao
- Based on: Yamagola (1977)
- Produced by: S. Venkataratnam
- Starring: Jeetendra; Jaya Prada
- Cinematography: S. Venkataratnam
- Edited by: Akkineni Sanjeeva Rao
- Music by: Laxmikant–Pyarelal
- Production company: Sree Pallavi Productions
- Release date: 23 November 1979
- Running time: 130 minutes
- Country: India
- Language: Hindi

Lok Parlok (transl. The world and thereafter) is a 1979 Indian Hindi-language fantasy comedy film, produced by S. Venkataratnam under the Sree Pallavi Productions banner and directed by T. Rama Rao. The film stars Jeetendra and Jaya Prada, with music composed by Laxmikant–Pyarelal. It is a remake of the Telugu film Yamagola (1977). Both films are made by same banner and director. The film was an average venture at the box office.

== Plot ==
The film begins in a village where village head Amar makes the area prosperous and antagonizes an autocrat, Kalicharan. Amar falls for Savitri, the daughter of Kalicharan. Knowing it, he seeks to kill Amar via a traditional professional killer, Ram Shastri. Shastri asks Kalicharan to wait until he completes demonic prayers. However, Kalicharan buries Amar temporarily. Amar proceeds to heaven, where he creates turmoil and encounters Indra. Afterwards, he is moved to hell, where, too, he gives rise to mayhem and revolts against Yama and Chitragupta. When things calm down Yama decides to reform the laws of hell. Amar, Yama and Chitragupta land on Earth in human form for a lookout. Amar is restored to his life with a promise to return upon their arrival. By that time, police are searching for Amar and suspect Kalicharan. Amar approaches Kalicharan as Ram Ghulam, whom Kali Charan forges as Amar, and he starts mocking him. Parallelly, Yama and Chitragupta face several challenges and are seized by the police but Amar helps rescues them. Being exhausted, they decide to go back, which makes Amar anxious. He invites them and accordingly Savitri serves them with adoration and asks for a boon to knit her beau, which they accept. At the time of the wedding, Amar is under the veil and Yama blesses the couple's long life releasing Amar from death. Suddenly, Kalicharan fires on Amar. Here, in a flash, Amar wakes up from the dream. At last, it is revealed that Ram Shastri is Amar’s friend Ram Ghulam, who divulges it all to be a farce and Kalicharan also pleads pardon. Finally, the movie ends on a happy note with the marriage of Amar and Savitri.

== Cast ==
- Jeetendra as Amar / Ram Ghulam
- Jaya Prada as Savitri
- Amjad Khan as Ram Shastri / Boston Strangler / Raman Raghav
- Madan Puri as Kalicharan
- Pradeep Kumar as Devraj Indra
- Premnath as Yamraj
- Deven Verma as Chitragupt Sharma
- Padma Khanna as Menaka
- Agha as Traffic Constable
- Rajan Haksar as Gopi
- Roopesh Kumar as Manager, Punjab Darbar Hotel
- Sunder as Rude car driver
- N. Salim Khan
- Tun Tun as Sundari
- Pandaribai
- Vijayalalitha
- Aparna
- Vijaya Bhanu
- Manju Bhargavi
- Jayamalini as Courtesan

== Soundtrack ==
The songs were composed by Laxmikant–Pyarelal and songs written by Anand Bakshi.

Song	Singer
"Aise Naacho, Aise Gaao"	Kishore Kumar
"Yeh Kehdo Yamraaj Se"	Kishore Kumar
"Amma Ri Amma, Yeh To Deewana Raste Mein Chhede"	Kishore Kumar, Asha Bhosle
"Baadal Kab Barsoge, Jab Barsoge, Tab Barsoge"	Kishore Kumar, Asha Bhosle
"Hum Tum Jeet Gaye, Dushman Haar Gaye"	Kishore Kumar, Asha Bhosle
"Bedardi Piya, Tune Jo Bhi Kaha"	Asha Bhosle
