= Bala Nagamma (1981 film) =

- Poster of the Tamil version
- Directed by: K. Shankar
- Screenplay by: S. Jagadeesan
- Produced by: A. Khader
- Starring: Sridevi; Sarath Babu
- Cinematography: N. Balakrishnan
- Edited by: K. Shankar; K. R. Krishnan
- Music by: Ilaiyaraaja
- Production company: K. B. Creations
- Release date: 26 October 1981
- Country: India
- Language: Tamil

Bala Nagamma is a 1981 Indian Tamil-language film directed by K. Shankar. The film stars Sridevi and Sarath Babu. It is based on the burra katha the same name. The film was released on 26 October 1981, and the Telugu dubbed version on 30 April 1982.

== Plot ==
Queen Punitha prays to the goddess Nagadevi to have a child as the kingdom has no heirs. The goddess offers her the choice of having a boy but losing her husband or having a girl and losing her own life. She chooses the latter and soon gives birth to a girl, Bala Nagamma. As she is dying, she asks Nagadevi to watch over her child. The king is heart-broken but is convinced to remarry so his daughter can have a mother. He marries Mohana who plots to be rid of Bala Nagamma to secure her own power in the kingdom. She convinces the king that his daughter's horoscope means he will die if Bala Nagamma lives. The king is unable to kill his child but abandons her in the forest. Nagadevi takes the child and raises her. As an adult, Bala meets king Vijayavarma of a neighbouring kingdom and the two soon marry. When Bala is pregnant, Vijayavarma leaves to subdue a group of bandits. He asks that Bala not cross the threshold of the palace while he's away. Bala gives birth to a son, Parthiban, while he's away. The evil magician Ranadeeran sees Bala when he asks to see the most beautiful woman in the world. Determined to have her, he tricks Bala into leaving the threshold of the palace and kidnaps her. Vijayavarma is also captured and transformed into a physically weak man when he tries to rescue her. Years pass and it falls to the young Partiban to rescue his parents with the help of Nagadevi.

== Cast ==
- Sridevi as Bala Nagamma
- K. R. Vijaya as Nagadevi
- Sarath Babu as Vijayavarma
- Master Babu as Parthiban
- S. A. Ashokan as the king
- Manju Bhargavi as Manju
- Baby Anju as young Bala Nagamma
- Vennira Aadai Nirmala as Puniavathi
- Manjula as Mohana
- V. S. Raghavan as Karunakaran
- Gandhimathi as Panjavarnam
- Moorthy as Sathinandham
- Thengai Srinivasan
- Manorama

== Production ==
The film initially began production as a Tamil-Telugu bilingual film, but the film was later only made in Tamil alongside a Telugu dubbed version, which was released a year later.

== Soundtrack ==
The soundtrack was composed by Ilaiyaraaja. The song "Koonthalile Megam" is set to the Carnatic raga Bilahari, and attained popularity.

Tamil

Song	Singers	Lyrics
"Koonthalile Megam"	K. J. Yesudas, B. S. Sasirekha	Kannadasan
"Sangeethame En Thegam Andro"	Vani Jairam	Pulamaipithan
"Manmadha Raagangale"	Vani Jairam	Pulamaipithan
"Palliyaraikul Malligai"	Uma Ramanan	Vaali
"Neer Kodukka Piranthathu"	P. Susheela, S. Janaki	Vaali
"Aadalaam Kadalil"	S. P. Sailaja	Muthulingam
"Vaaname Kaakum"	S. P. Sailaja	Muthulingam

Telugu

- "Kurulande Meghamvirishi..." – S. P. Balasubrahmanyam, Sasirekha
- "Sangeetha Maharani Nenu..." – Vani Jairam
- "Na Edalo Virisenamma Dola..." – S. P. Sailaja & P. Susheela
- "Manmadha Geethanjali..." – Vani Jairam
- "Malleteegara..." – S. P. Sailaja
- "Edi Raksha Vidhi..." – S. P. Balasubramanyam
- "Nemmadi Niratam..." – S. P. Sailaja
- "Saptasagramulu..." – S. P. Sailaja
- "Eekshanam Agni Bandhanam..." – S. P. Sailaja

== Reception ==
Reviewing the film for Kalki, Sindhu-Jeeva panned the comedy and sets, they criticised Ilaiyaraaja for using computerised music for background score but praised the songs.
