= Nayakudu Vinayakudu =

- Theatrical release poster
- Directed by: K. Pratyagatma
- Screenplay by: K. Pratyagatma
- Story by: C. S. Rao
- Produced by: A. V. Subba Rao
- Starring: Akkineni Nageswara Rao; Jayalalithaa
- Cinematography: P. S. Selvaraj
- Edited by: J. Krishna Swamy; Balu
- Music by: T. Chalapathi Rao
- Production company: Prasad Art Productions
- Release date: 1 February 1980
- Running time: 134 minutes
- Country: India
- Language: Telugu

Nayakudu Vinayakudu is a 1980 Indian Telugu-language film, produced by A. V. Subba Rao under the Prasad Art Productions banner and directed by K. Pratyagatma. It stars Akkineni Nageswara Rao, Jayalalithaa and features music composed by T. Chalapathi Rao. Notably, this marked Jayalalithaa's last proper film in her acting career as it got released just a few weeks after her last Tamil film, Nadhiyai Thedi Vandha Kadal. It was the last film where the actress-politician had worked as a lead heroine before entering official politics, as well as her last film in Telugu.

== Plot ==
Chiranjeevi, a Ph.D. scholar & student union leader, loves a charming girl, Vasantha, the daughter of Municipal Chairman Vinayaka Rao. Vinayaka Rao is spiteful and perpetrates anti-social activities in the veil of social welfare and illicitly siphons off the public, which Chiranjeevi antagonizes. So, begrudged Vinayaka Rao clutches Chiranjeevi's brother-in-law, Shekar, who deserts his wife and seeks Rs.50,000. Now, Chiranjeevi decides to sell their ancestors' property and spends a night there, acquiring a magical statuette that grants any wish. Through it, Chiranjeevi effects so many wonders and teases Vinayaka Rao but soon realizes it was his dream and returns. Then Vinayaka Rao swindles Shekar. He regrets it and pleads for pardon. At that point, Municipal elections are declared when Chiranjeevi contests against Vinayaka Rao and dethrones him. At last, Chiranjeevi ceases Vinayaka Rao, who retains a semblance of order & peace in the society. Finally, the movie ends on a happy note with the marriage of Chiranjeevi & Vasantha.

== Cast ==
- Akkineni Nageshwara Rao as Chiranjeevi
- J. Jayalalithaa as Vasantha
- Rao Gopal Rao as Vinayaka Rao
- P. L. Narayana as Viswasam
- Sarathi as Hanumanthu
- Sakshi Ranga Rao as Panthulu
- Lakshmikanth as Shekar
- Jaya Bhaskar as Shankaram
- Vankala Satyanarayana as Janaki Ramudu
- Arjaa Jannardhan Rao as Mallaiah
- Manju Bhargavi as Sivaranjani
- Roja Ramani as Madhumathi
- Pushpalata as Chiranjeevi's mother

== Soundtrack ==
Music composed by T. Chalapathi Rao.

Song title	Lyrics	Singers	length
"Oka Chinnadi"	Acharya Aatreya	S. P. Balasubrahmanyam, P. Susheela	3:34
"Ninnu Chudagaane Anni"	C. Narayana Reddy	S. P. Balasubrahmanyam, S. Janaki	5:04
"Aey Ley Niduraley"	C. Narayana Reddy	S. P. Balasubrahmanyam, P. Susheela	3:36
"Ravana Rajyam Poyindi"	Kosaraju	S. P. Balasubrahmanyam, Madhavapeddi Satyam, Vijayalakshmi Sarma	4:23
"Orabbi Mastaanu"	C. Narayana Reddy	P. Susheela, S. Janaki	5:17
"Vandanam Vandaanam"	Kosaraju	S. P. Balasubrahmanyam, Madhavapeddi Satyam, Vijayalakshmi Sarma	4:17
