= Mane Aliya =

- VCD cover
- Directed by: S. K. A. Chari
- Written by: Sadasivabrahmam
- Based on: Illarikam (Telugu)
- Produced by: A. V. Subba Rao
- Starring: Kalyan Kumar; Jayalalitha; K. S. Ashwath; Balakrishna
- Cinematography: Annayya
- Edited by: J. Krishnaswamy
- Music by: T. Chalapathi Rao
- Production company: Prasad Art Pictures
- Release date: 1964
- Country: India
- Language: Kannada

Mane Aliya is a 1964 Indian Kannada-language film, directed by S. K. A. Chari and produced by A. V. Subba Rao. The film stars Kalyan Kumar, Jayalalitha, K. S. Ashwath and Balakrishna in the lead roles. The film has musical score by T. Chalapathi Rao. The film was a remake of the Telugu film Illarikam (1959).

== Cast ==
- Kalyan Kumar as Somashekhar
- J. Jayalalithaa as Meenakshi
- K. S. Ashwath as Shivappa
- T. N. Balakrishna as 'Daskath' Danappa
- Narasimharaju as Parashivu
- Dikki Madhava Rao as Rudrappa
- M. P. Shankar as Nagesh
- Comedian Guggu as Pillari
- Rangabhoomi Narayan
- B. Hanumanthachar
- Shivaji
- H. R. Sharma
- Thangappan
- Vasudeva Girimaji
- Anantharao Machheri
- Sandhya as Meenakshi's mother
- R. T. Rama
- Vanishree
- Suryakala
- Lakshmidevi Thalikote
- Geetha
- Thara

== Soundtrack ==
The music was composed by T. Chalapathi Rao.

No.	Song	Singers	Lyrics	Length (m:ss)
1	"Bhale Chanside"	Madhavapeddi Satyam	Vijaya Narasimha	03:09
2	"Preethiya Hoogala Mudidavale"	P. B. Sreenivas	K. S. Narasimhaswamy	03:19
