= Police Brothers =

- Directed by: A. Mohan Gandhi
- Screenplay by: A. Mohan Gandhi
- Dialogues by: Posani Krishna Murali
- Story by: Posani Krishna Murali
- Produced by: Venkata Subba Rao
- Starring: Vinod Kumar Alva; Roja; Charan Raj
- Music by: Sri
- Production company: Prasad Art Pictures
- Release date: 1994
- Running time: 119 mins
- Country: India
- Language: Telugu

Police Brothers is a 1994 Telugu-language film produced by Venkata Subba Rao under Prasad Art Pictures banner and directed by Mohan Gandhi. The film stars Vinod Kumar Alva, Roja, and Charan Raj while Kota Srinivasa Rao, Babu Mohan, Manorama, and Kovai Sarala play supporting roles. The music was composed by Sri. It marks the debut of screenwriter Posani Krishna Murali, who provided the story and dialogues for the film. The film was remade in Hindi as Muqabla.

== Cast ==
- Vinod Kumar Alva
- Roja
- Charan Raj
- Kota Srinivasa Rao
- Devan
- Babu Mohan
- Kovai Sarala
- Manorama
- Delhi Ganesh
- Paruchuri Venkateswara Rao
