= Parivartana (1954 film) =

- Theatrical release poster
- Directed by: T. Prakash Rao
- Screenplay by: T. Prakash Rao
- Based on: Anna-Chellelu by Srirama Murthy Pinisetti
- Produced by: Chandra Durga Veerasimha
- Starring: N. T. Rama Rao; Akkineni Nageswara Rao; Savitri
- Cinematography: Kamal Ghosh
- Edited by: G. D. Joshi
- Music by: T. Chalapathi Rao
- Production company: Janata Pictures
- Release date: 1 September 1954
- Country: India
- Language: Telugu

Parivartana (transl. Realization) is a 1954 Indian Telugu-language drama film directed by T. Prakash Rao. It stars N. T. Rama Rao, Akkineni Nageswara Rao and Savitri, with music composed by T. Chalapathi Rao. The film is based on Srirama Murthy Pinisetti's novel Anna-Chellelu.

== Plot ==
The Zamindar of a village has no children and adopts a boy from an orphanage. The boy grows up as Ananda Rao and returns to the town after higher education. Shortly before his death, the Zamindar hands over the estate affairs to Ramayya, who gains a good reputation and prestige. He has a son, Satyam, and a daughter, Sundaramma. Ananda Rao feels jealous of Ramayya. Chalapathi and Pitchayya add to his jealousy. He insults Ramayya and stops the donation program from running under the name of the Zamindar. Satyam, unemployed, joins as a bus conductor, and Ramayya dies of helplessness. Ananda Rao purchases the bus and dismisses Satyam from the job. Chalapathi insults Sundaramma, angered Satyam, beats him, and goes to jail. Chalapathi and Pichayya steal the adoption papers from Ananda Rao and try to dismiss him. He joins the Annadana Samajam. It changes him, and he repents for the injustice done to the Ramayya family. Sundaramma recognizes the change in his mindset and starts loving him. Satyam acknowledges the love affair between them, recollects the documents from Pitchayya, and provides them with the papers in court, which penalizes Chalapathi & Pichayya. Finally, the movie ends on a happy note with the marriage of Ananda Rao & Sundaramma.

== Cast ==
- N. T. Rama Rao as Ananda Rao
- Akkineni Nageswara Rao as Satyam
- Savitri as Sundaramma
- Doraiswamy as Ramayya
- Ramana Reddy as Chalapathi
- Chadalavada as Pichayya
- Mikkilineni as Sanjeevayya
- Surabhi Balasaraswati
- Allu Ramalingaiah
- Perumallu
- Ramakoti

== Music ==
Parivartana

Film score by T. Chalapathi Rao
- Released: 1954
- Genre: Soundtrack
- Length: 28:44
- Producer: T. Chalapathi Rao

Music was composed by T. Chalapathi Rao. Lyrics were written by Anisetti. Music released on Audio Company.

S. No.	Song title	Singers	length
1	"Amma Amma Avanimaata"	Ghantasala, P. Leela	3:56
2	"Ohoho Inta Challani Vela"	Jikki	3:05
3	"Nandare Lokamento Chitramura"	Madhavapeddi Satyam	2:39
4	"Anandamaayi Anandam"	K. Jamuna Rani	2:52
5	"Randoi Raarandoi"	Madhavapeddi Satyam	2:58
6	"Avunantara! Kaadantara!"	K. Jamuna Rani	2:13
7	"Raju Vedale Chudara"	Ghantasala	4:34
8	"Aavedane Brathukunu"	Ghantasala	3:14
9	"Kaalam Raa"	Ghantasala	3:13
