= Brahmachari (1968 Telugu film) =

- Theatrical release poster
- Directed by: T. Rama Rao
- Written by: Bhamidapaati Radha Krishna (dialogues)
- Screenplay by: T. Rama Rao
- Story by: Balamurugan
- Produced by: A. V. Subba Rao
- Starring: Akkineni Nageswara Rao; Jayalalitha
- Cinematography: P. S. Selvaraj
- Edited by: J. Krshna Swamy
- Music by: T. Chalapathi Rao
- Production company: Prasad Art Productions
- Distributed by: Navayuga Films
- Release date: 1 February 1968
- Running time: 160 minutes
- Country: India
- Language: Telugu

Brahmachari (transl. Bachelor) is a 1968 Indian Telugu-language comedy drama film, produced by A. V. Subba Rao under the Prasad Art Productions banner and directed by T. Rama Rao. The film stars Akkineni Nageswara Rao and Jayalalithaa, with music composed by T. Chalapathi Rao. It was released on 1 February 1968. The film was remade in Hindi as Ek Nari Ek Brahmachari (1971). It was loosely based on the 1967 Tamil movie Penne Nee Vaazhga.

== Cast ==
- Akkineni Nageswara Rao as Ramakrishna
- Jayalalithaa as Vasantha
- Nagabhushanam as Rao Sahib Parandhamaiah
- Ramana Reddy as Bangaraiah
- Chalam as Jogulu
- Raja Babu as Devaiah
- Prabhakar Reddy as Ananda Rao
- Raavi Kondala Rao as Doctor
- Perumallu as Vasantha's grandfather
- Potti Prasad as Sodabuddi
- Suryakantham as Gajalakshmi
- Rama Prabha as Mallika
- Sukanya as Janaki
- Pushpa Kumari as Shanta

== Soundtrack ==
Music composed by T. Chalapathi Rao.

S. No.	Song title	Lyrics	Singers	length
1	"O Brahmachari"	Dasaradhi	P. Susheela, B. Vasantha	3:49
2	"Ee Vennela"	C. Narayana Reddy	Ghantasala, P. Susheela	8:40
3	"Eethotalo Virabuseno"	Aathreya	Ghantasala, P. Susheela	3:20
4	"Ninuchusanu Kannuvesanu"	Kosaraju	T. R. Jayadev, B. Vasantha	3:54
5	"Okkasari Siggumani"	Dasaradhi	P. Susheela	4:05
6	"Brahmacharulalo"	C. Narayana Reddy	Mohan Raju	0:50
