= Aadarsa Kutumbam =

- Theatrical release poster
- Directed by: K. Pratyagatma
- Written by: Acharya Aatreya (dialogues)
- Screenplay by: K. Pratyagatma; Acharya Aatreya
- Story by: K. Pratyagatma
- Produced by: A. V. Subba Rao
- Starring: Akkineni Nageswara Rao; Jayalalitha
- Cinematography: P. S. Selvaraj
- Edited by: J. Krshna Swamy; Balu
- Music by: S. Rajeswara Rao
- Production company: Prasad Art Productions
- Distributed by: Navayuga Films
- Release date: 6 June 1969
- Running time: 175 minutes
- Country: India
- Language: Telugu

Aadarsa Kutumbam (transl. Ideal Family) is a 1969 Indian Telugu-language drama film directed by K. Pratyagatma. It stars Akkineni Nageswara Rao and Jayalalithaa, with music composed by S. Rajeswara Rao. It was produced by A. V. Subba Rao under the Prasad Art Productions banner. The film won the National Film Award for Best Feature Film in Telugu for the year 1969.

== Plot ==
Pattabhi and Janaki’s kindness is mistaken for weakness, allowing the rest of the family to exploit them. Prasad marries Saroja and brings her home amidst this chaos of financial extravagance, constant arguments, and deceit. Recognizing the toxicity, Prasad and Saroja devise a clever ruse to force a family partition. The rest of the story follows their efforts to teach the siblings a lesson, ultimately mending the broken relationships and reuniting the family.

== Cast ==
- Akkineni Nageswara Rao as Prasad
- Jayalalithaa as Saroja
- V. Nagayya as Raghavendra Rao
- Gummadi as Pattabhi
- Nagabhushanam as Prakasam
- Padmanabham as Suryam
- Ramana Reddy as Damodaram
- Sakshi Ranga Rao as Appaiah Panthulu
- Bheemaraju as Pratap
- Anjali Devi as Janaki
- S. Varalakshmi as Jaya
- Suryakantham as Durgamma
- Hemalatha as Rajyalakshmi
- Geetanjali as Rama
- Vijaya Lalitha as Sunita
- Surabhi Balasaraswathi as Rami
- Anitha as Chandra

== Soundtrack ==
Aadarsa Kutumbam

Film score by S. Rajeswara Rao
- Released: 1969
- Genre: Soundtrack
- Length: 26:15
- Producer: S. Rajeswara Rao

S. Rajeswara Rao chronology
Bangaaru Panjaram (1969)	Aadarsa Kutumbam (1969)	Aatmiyulu (1969)

Music composed by S. Rajeswara Rao.

No.	Title	Lyrics	Singer(s)	Length
1.	"Hello Saru"	C. Narayana Reddy	Ghantasala, P. Susheela	3:36
2.	"Bidiyamela O Cheli"	C. Narayana Reddy	Ghantasala, P. Susheela	3:02
3.	"Cheyi Cheyi"	Acharya Aatreya	Ghantasala, P. Susheela	3:53
4.	"Kalla Gajji Kankalamma"	Acharya Aatreya	P. Susheela	3:43
5.	"Surya Vamsamu"	Kosaraju	Ghantasala	4:47
6.	"Edukondala Venkateswara"	Kosaraju	Ghantasala	3:21
7.	"Yei Yeira Chostavera"	C. Narayana Reddy	Ghantasala, P. Susheela	3:53

== Awards ==
- National Film Award for Best Feature Film in Telugu - 1969
- K. Pratyagatma won Nandi Award for Second Best Story Writer (1969)
