= Talli Tandrulu =

- Theatrical release poster
- Directed by: T. Rama Rao
- Written by: Paruchuri Brothers (story / dialogues)
- Screenplay by: T. Rama Rao
- Produced by: A. V. Subba Rao
- Starring: Nandamuri Balakrishna; Vijayashanti
- Cinematography: P. N. Sundaram
- Edited by: Krishna Swamy; Balu
- Music by: Chakravarthy
- Production company: Prasad Art Pictures
- Release date: 9 February 1991
- Running time: 140 minutes
- Country: India
- Language: Telugu

Talli Tandrulu (transl. Parents) is a 1991 Telugu-language drama film, produced by A. V. Subba Rao and directed by T. Rama Rao. It stars Nandamuri Balakrishna and Vijayashanti, with music composed by Chakravarthy. The film was successful at the box office.

== Cast ==
- Nandamuri Balakrishna as Anand
- Vijayashanti as Kavitha
- Satyanarayana as Sivaram
- Gummadi as Venkataramaiah
- Jaggayya as Dr. Ranga Rao
- Paruchuri Venteswara Rao as Jagapathi & Gajapathi (Dual role)
- Sakshi Ranga Rao as Deeshithulu
- Narra Venkateswara Rao as Pulla Rao
- Vijayan as Chanti Babu
- Vidya Sagar as Prakash Rao
- Vinod as Ashok
- Raj Varma as Police Inspector
- Raja as Anand's friend
- Ali as Hotel Boy
- Bhimiswara Rao as Income Tax Officer
- Jayanthi as Padmavathi
- Sudha as Vimala
- Tatineni Rajeswari as Kavitha's mother
- Sri Lakshmi as Kamala
- Kalpana Rai as Principal
- Y. Vijaya as Jamuna Bai
- Master Tarun as Babji
- Baby Sujitha as Rani

== Crew Members ==
- A Sai Prasad as Executive Producer

== Soundtrack ==
Talli Tandrulu

Film score by Chakravarthy
- Released: 1991
- Genre: Soundtrack
- Length: 21:26
- Label: Cauvery Audio
- Producer: Chakravarthy

Chakravarthy chronology
| Lorry Driver (1990) | Talli Tandrulu (1991) | Amma Raginama (1991) |

Music composed by Chakravarthy. Music released on Cauvery Audio Company.

| No. | Title | Lyrics | Singer(s) | Length |
|---|---|---|---|---|
| 1. | "Krishnaa Navanandha" | Veturi | S. P. Balasubrahmanyam, Chitra | 5:17 |
| 2. | "Vinavammaa" | Sirivennela Sitarama Sastry | S. P. Sailaja, Sujatha | 3:50 |
| 3. | "Chamanthi Puvvanti" | Sirivennela Sitarama Sastry | S. P. Balasubrahmanyam, Chitra | 4:59 |
| 4. | "Chitikese Chinthamani" | Sirivennela Sitarama Sastry | S. P. Balasubrahmanyam, Chitra | 3:15 |
| 5. | "Pandiri Mancham" | Veturi | S. P. Balasubrahmanyam, Chitra | 4:05 |
| Total length: | | | | 21:26 |
