= Yamagola =

- Theatrical release poster
- Directed by: T. Rama Rao
- Screenplay by: T. Rama Rao
- Story by: D. V. Narasa Raju
- Produced by: S. Venkataratnam
- Starring: N. T. Rama Rao; Jaya Prada
- Cinematography: S. Venkataratnam
- Edited by: A. Sanjeevi
- Music by: Chakravarthy
- Production company: Sree Pallavi Films
- Release date: 21 October 1977
- Running time: 150 minutes
- Country: India
- Language: Telugu

Yamagola (transl. Havoc in Hell or transl. The Great Havoc) is a 1977 Indian Telugu-language fantasy comedy film directed by T. Rama Rao who co-wrote the film with D. V. Narasa Raju. It stars N. T. Rama Rao and Jaya Prada, with music composed by Chakravarthy. The film was produced by S. Venkataratnam who also worked as the cinematographer.

Yamagola released on 21 October 1977 and received positive reviews. The dialogues penned by D. V. Narasaraju were perceived as a satire on contemporary politics, especially the Emergency and are considered as one of the highlights of the film along with the performances of the cast and the music. It was remade in Hindi as Lok Parlok (1979) and in Tamil as Yamanukku Yaman (1980), while also inspiring the 2007 Telugu film Yamadonga.

== Plot ==
The film opens in a village where Satyam, the village president, works to improve the area's prosperity while standing up to the tyranny of Rudrayya, a local landlord. Satyam falls in love with Savitri, Rudrayya's daughter. Upon discovering their relationship, Rudrayya plots to eliminate Satyam. He hires Ram Sastry, a professional killer, to murder Satyam under the guise of a traditional ritual. After the murder, Ram Sastry tells Rudrayya to wait until his demonic prayers are complete, but as time passes, Rudrayya grows impatient and buries Satyam’s body in his backyard.

Satyam’s soul is mistakenly sent to heaven, where he causes chaos and eventually encounters Indra. He is then transferred to hell, where he continues to stir up trouble by organizing a rebellion among the hell soldiers. Satyam challenges Yama Dharma Raja and Chitragupta, but after negotiations, Yama agrees to reform their laws. Yama and Chitragupta then descend to Earth in human form to implement these reforms, declaring a lockout of hell. Satyam is also restored to life with the promise that he must return when Yama and Chitragupta do.

Meanwhile, the police investigate Satyam's disappearance and begin to suspect Rudrayya. Satyam, now alive, approaches Rudrayya disguised as Sundaram, his doppelgänger. Rudrayya, unaware of the truth, hires Sundaram to impersonate Satyam, and Sundaram begins to mock Rudrayya. Meanwhile, Yama and Chitragupta, now on Earth, face several challenges and are eventually arrested by the police, only to be freed by Satyam.

Exhausted, Yama and Chitragupta prepare to return to the afterlife, which alarms Satyam as his life would also end. Satyam invites them to Rudrayya's house under the pretense of seeking a boon for his marriage to Savitri. Savitri, unaware of the situation, serves Yama and Chitragupta with reverence and requests a blessing for her marriage to Satyam. Yama grants the blessing, inadvertently extending Satyam's life.

During the wedding, Satyam hides under the veil, and Yama blesses the couple with a long life, allowing Satyam to escape death. However, Rudrayya suddenly attempts to shoot Satyam. At this moment, Satyam wakes up, revealing that the entire sequence was a dream. As Rudrayya tries to attack him again, Satyam stops him and reveals that Ram Sastry is actually his friend, Ramana Murthy, and that the entire scheme was part of a larger plan. In the end, Rudrayya seeks forgiveness, and the film concludes with the happy marriage of Satyam and Savitri.

== Cast ==
- N. T. Rama Rao as Satyam
- Jaya Prada as Savithri
- Rao Gopal Rao as Rudrayya
- Kaikala Satyanarayana as Yama Dharma Raju
- Allu Ramalingaiah as Chitraguptudu
- Prabhakar Reddy as Ramana Murthy/Rama Sastry
- Kanta Rao as Indra
- P. J. Sarma as Police Inspector
- Chalapathi Rao as Satyam's friend
- K. V. Chalam as Peerayya
- Potti Prasad as Dentist
- Suryakantham as Seethamma
- Manju Bhargavi as Menaka
- Jhansi as Wife of Rudrayya
- Jayamalini in an item number
- Nirmalamma as Santhamma

== Production ==
The film was inspired by Rama Rao's own Devanthakudu (1960), and two other films — Death Takes a Holiday (1934) and Chase a Crooked Shadow (1958). Devanthakudu, in turn was a remake of the 1958 Bengali film Jamalaye Jibanta Manush based on the novel of the same name by Dinabandhu Mitra. Principal photography began on 28 May 1977, and was completed in 27 working days.

== Soundtrack ==
Music was composed by Chakravarthy.

Track listing
No.	Title	Lyrics	Singer(s)	Length
1.	"Olammi Tikka Reginda"	Veturi	S. P. Balasubrahmanyam, P. Susheela	3:15
2.	"Chilaka Kottudu Kodithe"	Veturi	S. P. Balasubrahmanyam, P. Susheela	3:21
3.	"Aadave Andala Sura Bhamini"	Veeturi	S. P. Balasubrahmanyam, P. Susheela	6:00
4.	"Gudivada Ellanu Gunturu Poyyanu"	Veeturi	P. Susheela	3:06
5.	"Samaraaniki Nede Prarambham"	Sri Sri	S. P. Balasubrahmanyam	3:12
6.	"Vayasu Musurukosthunnadi"	C. Narayana Reddy	S. P. Balasubrahmanyam, P. Susheela	3:16
Total length:				22:10

== Release ==
Yamagola was released on 21 October 1977. The film celebrated a silver jubilee run at 6 centres and ran for 40 weeks in Hyderabad and Vijayawada.

== Reception ==
A reviewer for Andhra Jyothi praised D. V. Narasaraju's dialogues, performances of the cast and called it, a colourful film which would entertain all kinds of audiences. Another reviewer for Andhra Patrika wrote that Yamagola is a satirical film on the current societal conditions told in a light-hearted manner. The reviewer noted the satirical dialogues of Narasaraju as the major highlight of the film and commended the performances of the cast and the music. Kompella Viswam of Sitara magazine noted the similarities between Yamagola and C. Pullayya's Devanthakudu. Furthermore, he praised the dialogues penned by D. V. Narasaraju especially those on Sanjay Gandhi and the Emergency, the performances of the cast and the direction of T. Rama Rao.

== Legacy ==
The film was remade into Hindi as Lok Parlok in 1979, with Jaya Prada reprising her role. It was also remade in Tamil as Yamanukku Yaman (1980).

Yamagola also inspired the 2007 Telugu film Yamadonga directed by S. S. Rajamouli. The film which follows the basic plotline of Yamagola starred Rama Rao's grandson N. T. Rama Rao Jr.
