= Son Of =

Indian Telugu-language family drama film

- Theatrical release poster
- Directed by: Bathula Satish
- Produced by: Sai Simhadri
- Starring: Sai Simhadri; Vinod Kumar; Meera Raj
- Cinematography: VRK Naidu
- Edited by: Amarnath
- Music by: Rishi M
- Production company: Sai Simhadri Sainma banner
- Release date: 27 February 2026
- Country: India
- Language: Telugu

Son Of is a 2026 Indian Telugu-language family drama film directed by Bathula Satish and produced by Sai Simhadri under the Sai Simhadri Sainma banner. The film features veteran actor Vinod Kumar alongside debutants Sai Simhadri and Meera Raj in the lead roles. The story primarily focuses on the emotional relationship and ideological conflicts between a father and his son. The film was released theatrically on 27 February 2026.

== Plot ==
Venkat Rao is a single father who raises his son, Anand, with immense affection after his wife's early demise. Despite his father's love, Anand grows up to be an irresponsible youth who frequently fails his studies and fails to meet his father's expectations. Anand is deeply in love with his childhood friend, Anu, and both families eventually agree to their marriage.

However, a major conflict erupts during the couple's engagement ceremony. Venkat Rao abruptly stops the proceedings, publicly humiliating Anand for being jobless and wandering aimlessly, questioning how such an irresponsible man could possibly support a wife. Deeply insulted and enraged by his father's public outburst, Anand takes a drastic step and files a court case against his own father, demanding his rightful inheritance of the family house and property.

In response to the lawsuit, Venkat Rao places a strict condition on Anand before handing over the assets. The remainder of the story follows the courtroom drama and Anand's subsequent journey. Through his struggles to raise a child and meet his father's condition, Anand learns about the true value of life, the heavy responsibilities of parenthood, and the sacrifices a father makes, leading to an emotional and shocking climax.

== Cast ==
- Vinod Kumar as Venkat Rao, Anand's father
- Sai Simhadri as Anand
  - Aakash Srinivas as young Anand
- Meera Raj as Anu
  - Akshara Nalla as young Anu
- Aamani as Anand’s mother
- Vasu Inturi as Anand’s uncle
- Surya as Anu’s father
- Chitram Srinu as Venkatrao’s friend
- Srinivas Vadlamani as Judge
- Lokesh Kumar Parimi as Anand’s friend

== Production ==
Son Of marks the acting and production debut of Sai Simhadri, who bankrolled the project under his home banner, Sai Simhadri Sainma. The film was directed by Bathula Satish, who crafted a script aimed at delivering a strong social message to today's youth about taking up life's responsibilities.

The film's technical crew includes Rishi M, who composed the music and background score, and cinematographer VRK Naidu, who was praised for beautifully capturing the film's rustic village backdrop. Amar Nath served as the film's editor.

== Reception ==
The film opened to generally mixed to positive reviews.

Hindustan Times Telugu gave the film a 2.5 out of 5 rating, calling it a captivating family drama thriller that effectively engages the audience with its strong father-son emotions.

Zee News Telugu rated the movie 2.5 out of 5, noting that it successfully touches the heart and will definitely earn a special place among films based on father-son bonding.

Times Now Telugu awarded the film a 2.5 out of 5 rating, summarizing that the father sentiment works out very well and will appeal to all sections of the audience, especially families in rural areas.

Sakshi highlights that while the core concept feels familiar, the movie's message for today's youth works well and leaves the audience feeling fully satisfied by the end.
