= Main Intaquam Loonga =

1982 Bollywood sports film

- Poster
- Directed by: T. Rama Rao
- Written by: D. V. Narasa Raju (story); Dr. Rahi Masoom Reza (dialogues)
- Based on: Thayige Thakka Maga by V. Somashekhar
- Produced by: A. V. Subba Rao
- Starring: Dharmendra; Reena Roy
- Cinematography: P. N. Sundaram
- Edited by: J. Krishnaswamy; T. V. Balasubramaniam
- Music by: Laxmikant-Pyarelal
- Production company: Prasad Art Productions
- Release date: 21 May 1982
- Country: India
- Language: Hindi

Main Intaquam Loonga (transl. I will take revenge) is a 1982 Indian Hindi-language action sports film starring Dharmendra, Reena Roy, Nirupa Roy, and Amrish Puri. Dharmendra plays a boxer in the film. It is a remake of the 1978 Kannada film Thayige Thakka Maga.

Dharmendra's son Sunny Deol was used as a stand-in for his father where he is shown doing one hand push-ups at the very beginning of the title song. This was before he made his debut as a leading actor in Betaab (1983). Footage from this film was used in the 2007 film Apne, also starring Dharmendra as a retired boxer.

== Plot ==
Kumar is interested in boxing, but his mother Janki does not want him to become a boxer. He falls in love with his neighbour, Mala, a detective by profession. They are soon to be married. The story moves forward by Mala finding out that G.D., who runs a gym where he trains boxers and only wants his trainee to win the boxing championship, he commits many crimes and she seeks evidence, so he can be jailed.

The story takes a turn when Janki gets a call from mental hospital that Ganga has completely recovered and can be discharged from the hospital. She shares her agony with her husband and tells him that it would be impossible to give back her son to his biological mother Ganga. Overhearing this conversation, Kumar is shattered. But when Ganga meets his son for the first time, she doesn't reveal the truth to him, realising that Janki is a heart patient and would die without Kumar and soon moves to Haridwar. Kumar goes to Haridwar to find her and brings her back and provides her a house. He doesn't reveal to Janki about their association. Soon he learns that his biological father, Ajay, was a boxing champion who was killed by G.D.

Kumar decides to take revenge by winning a boxing championship against the killers and he finally succeeds. But, seeing the murder of her husband's murderers, Ganga becomes disturbed and dies on the spot. Kumar returns home and announces that Ganga is dead, but still doesn't confess that he knows the truth. The story ends with the family remembering Ganga.

== Cast ==
- Dharmendra as Kumar Agnihotri "Bittu"
- Reena Roy as Mala Bajpai
- Sunny Deol as dharmendra's push up (Uncredited)
- Shreeram Lagoo as Madan Agnihotri
- Nirupa Roy as Janki Agnihotri
- Amrish Puri as Govardhan Das "G.D."
- Dara Singh as Ajay
- Sharada as Ganga
- Asrani as Premi
- Bob Christo as Anthony
- Sharat Saxena as Boxer Tiger Azaad
- Yusuf Khan as Boxer Gopinath
- Ceylon Manohar as Manohar
- Agha as Colonel Bajpai

== Songs ==
Song	Singer
"Maamla Fit"	Kishore Kumar
"Achhi Achhi Maa"	Kishore Kumar
"Mujhe Na Bulaya"	Kishore Kumar, Asha Bhosle
"Is Sapnon Ki"	Shabbir Kumar, Asha Bhosle
"Maa Tu Mujhse"	S. P. Balasubrahmanyam
"Intaquam Loonga"	S. P. Balasubrahmanyam
