= Judaai (1980 film) =

- Theatrical release poster
- Directed by: T. Rama Rao
- Written by: Dr. Rahi Masoom Reza (dialogues)
- Screenplay by: T. Rama Rao
- Story by: M. Balamurugan
- Based on: Aalu Magalu (1977)
- Produced by: A. V. Subba Rao
- Starring: Jeetendra; Rekha
- Cinematography: P. S. Selvaraj
- Edited by: J. Krishnaswamy; V. Balasubramaniam
- Music by: Laxmikant–Pyarelal
- Production company: Prasad Art Pictures
- Distributed by: Annapoorna Studios
- Release date: 26 September 1980
- Running time: 149 minutes
- Country: India
- Language: Hindi

Judaai (transl. Separation) is a 1980 Indian Hindi-language drama film, produced by A.V. Subba Rao under the Prasad Art Pictures banner and directed by T. Rama Rao. The film stars Jeetendra and Rekha, with music composed by Laxmikant–Pyarelal. It is a remake of the Telugu film Aalu Magalu (1977).

== Cast ==
- Ashok Kumar as Retired Justice Verma
- Jeetendra as Dr. Shashikant Verma
- Rekha as Gauri Verma
- Sachin as Ravikant Verma
- Arun Govil as Umakant Verma
- Shoma Anand as Manisha
- Tamanna as Monica
- Deven Varma as Ram Narayan
- Asha Sachdev as Krishna
- Aruna Irani as Miss Lily (Dancer)
- Helena Luke as Madhavika
- Madan Puri as Dubey
- A. K. Hangal as Narayan Singh
- Asit Sen as Constable Dinanath Tiwari

== Crew ==
- Direction – T. Rama Rao
- Story – M. Balamurugan
- Screenplay – T. Rama Rao
- Dialogue – Dr. Rahi Masoom Reza
- Production – Anumolu Venkata Subba Rao
- Production Company – Prasad Art Pictures
- Editing – J. Krishnaswamy, V. Balasubramaniam
- Art Direction – G.V. Subba Rao
- Costume Design – Akbar Gabbana, Leena Daru
- Choreography – Hiralal, Manohar Naidu, Suresh Bhatt
- Music Direction – Laxmikant–Pyarelal
- Lyrics – Anand Bakshi
- Playback – Amit Kumar, Anuradha Paudwal, Asha Bhosle, Chandrani Mukherjee, Kishore Kumar, Lata Mangeshkar, Mohammad Rafi, Shailendra Singh

== Soundtrack ==
Lyrics: Anand Bakshi

Song	Singer
"Maar Gayi Mujhe Teri Judaai, Das Gayi Yeh"	Kishore Kumar, Asha Bhosle
"Samne Aa, Dekhen Zamana Sara, Samne Aa"	Kishore Kumar, Asha Bhosle
"Bansi Bajao Bansibajaiya, Chaaron Taraf Gopiyan"	Kishore Kumar, Anuradha Paudwal
"Apnon Ko Jo Thukrayega"	Mohammed Rafi
"Mausam Suhane Aa Gaye, Pyar Ke Zamane Aa Gaye"	Mohammed Rafi, Asha Bhosle
"Tere Naam Ke Hum Deewane Hai, Yeh Tere Pyar Ke Din Suhane Hai, Honthon Pe Dil Ke Jo Fasane Hai"	Amit Kumar, Shailendra Singh, Anuradha Paudwal, Chandrani Mukherjee

== Awards ==
- 1981 Filmfare Awards - Nominated

- Best Actress - Rekha
- Best Comedian - Deven Verma
