= Kula Gotralu =

- Theatrical release poster
- Directed by: K. Pratyagatma
- Written by: Acharya Aatreya (dialogues)
- Screenplay by: K. Pratyagatma
- Story by: K. Pratyagatma
- Produced by: A. V. Subba Rao
- Starring: Akkineni Nageswara Rao; Krishna Kumari
- Cinematography: A. Vincent
- Edited by: A. Sanjeevi
- Music by: S. Rajeswara Rao
- Production company: Prasad Art Pictures
- Distributed by: Navayuga Films
- Release date: 24 August 1962
- Running time: 158 mins
- Country: India
- Language: Telugu

Kula Gotralu (transl. Caste and Clans) is a 1962 Indian Telugu-language drama film written and directed by K. Pratyagatma. It stars Akkineni Nageswara Rao, Krishna Kumari and has music composed by S. Rajeswara Rao. Acharya Aatreya wrote the dialogues for the film. It was produced by A. V. Subba Rao under the Prasad Art Pictures banner.

The film won the National Film Award for Best Feature Film in Telugu certificate of merit in 1963. Krishna, who became an established actor later, played the role of a sidekick in the film.

== Cast ==
- Akkineni Nageswara Rao as Ravi
- Krishna Kumari as Saroja
- Gummadi as Bhushayya
- Relangi as Sadanandam
- Ramana Reddy as Ramanayya
- Padmanabham as J. J. Rao / Jasthi Joga Rao
- Allu Ramalingaiah as Peeramma
- Raja Babu as Ravi's friend
- Mikkilineni as Chalapati
- Krishna as Bridegroom in marriage
- Suryakantam as Jagadamba
- G. Varalakshmi as Kanthamma
- Girija as Leela
- Sandhya as Anasuya
- Nirmalamma as Santhamma

== Production ==
It was the first film to be shot in Visakhapatnam.

== Music ==
Kula Gotralu

Film score by S. Rajeswara Rao
- Released: 1962
- Genre: Soundtrack
- Length: 40:00
- Producer: S. Rajeswara Rao

Music was composed by S. Rajeswara Rao. The song "Ayyayyo Chethilo Dabbulo Poyane" is partially based on "Jia O Jia" from the Hindi film Jab Pyar Kisi Se Hota Hai (1961).

S. No	Song title	Lyrics	Singers	length
1	"Chelikadu Ninne Rammani Piluvaa"	C. Narayana Reddy	Ghantasala, P. Susheela	5:00
2	"Chilipi Kanula Thiyyani Chelikadaa"	C. Narayana Reddy	Ghantasala, P. Suseela	5:00
3	"Ayyayyo Chethilo Dabbulo Poyane"	Kosaraju	Madhavapeddi Satyam, Pithapuram	5:00
4	"Maama Sathru Bhayankara" (Padyalu)	Kosaraju	Madhavapeddi, Relangi	5:04
5	"Nee Nallani Jadalo Poolu"	Kosaraju	Jamuna Rani, Pithapuram	4:56
6	"Raave Raave Balaa"	Kosaraju	P. B. Sreenivas, Jamuna Rani	5:00
7	"Ravayya Maa Intiki"	Kosaraju	Ghantasala, P. Susheela	6:06
8	"Sakhi Sakuntala Rekkalu Dharinchi"	Sri Sri	Ghantasala, P. Susheela, Swarnalatha	5:00

== Awards ==
National Film Awards

- 1962: Certificate of Merit for the Second Best Feature Film in Telugu
