= Illarikam =

1959 film by T. Prakash Rao

- Theatrical release Poster
- Directed by: T. Prakash Rao
- Written by: Arudra (dialogues)
- Screenplay by: T. Prakash Rao
- Story by: Vempati Sadasivabrahmam
- Produced by: A. V. Subba Rao
- Starring: Akkineni Nageswara Rao; Jamuna
- Cinematography: A. Vincent
- Edited by: A. Sanjeevi
- Music by: T. Chalapathi Rao
- Production company: Prasad Art Productions
- Distributed by: Navayuga Films
- Release date: 1 May 1959
- Running time: 160 minutes
- Country: India
- Language: Telugu

Illarikam (transl. Matrilocal residence) is a 1959 Indian Telugu-language comedy drama film directed by T. Prakash Rao. It stars Akkineni Nageswara Rao, Jamuna and music composed by T. Chalapathi Rao. It was produced by A. V. Subba Rao under the Prasad Art Pictures banner. The film was a major success at the box office.

Illarikam literally means a bridegroom going to the bride's family and living permanently with them (matrilocality), contrary to the custom of the bride going into the groom's family (patrilocality). This custom is observed in some rich families generally where the bride is the only child to her parents.

Illarikam was remade in four languages. L. V. Prasad produced the Hindi version titled Sasural (1961), which T. Prakash Rao directed. It was again remade in Hindi as Ghar Jamai (1992). A. V. Subbarao himself remade it in Kannada as Mane Aliya (1964), in Malayalam as Kalithozhan (1966) and in Tamil as Maadi Veettu Mappilai (1967). All these versions were box office hits.

== Cast ==
- Akkineni Nageswara Rao as Venu
- Jamuna as Radha
- Gummadi as Zamindar
- Relangi as Brahmanandam
- Ramana Reddy as Dharmayya
- C.S.R. as Govindayya
- R. Nageswara Rao as Sadanandam/Seshagiri
- Allu Ramalingaiah as Panakalu
- Peketi Sivaram
- Hemalatha as Sundaramma
- Girija as Kanakadurga
- T. G. Kamala Devi as Zamindar's sister
- Bala as Savithri
- Surabhi Kamalabai
- Boddapati

== Production ==
After releasing the dubbed version of the Tamil film Uthamaputhiran in Telugu, A. V. Subbarao announced his next project Illarikam, with Nageswara Rao, based on the story of Vemapti Sadasivabrahmam. This was Nageswara Rao's 74th film.

Nageswara Rao suggested to remove the song "Niluvave Vaalu Kanuladaana" as he felt the audience may not like the teasing song, as by then the heroine had realised the truth, but the producer and the director felt otherwise. After its release, seeing the audience response to that song, Nageswara Rao conceded that he was wrong. T. Rama Rao started his career as an assistant director with Illarikam.

== Music ==
Music was composed by T. Chalapathi Rao. The song "Niluvave Vaalu" was remixed by Mani Sharma in Lakshyam (2007).

Song title	Lyrics	Singers	length
"Adigindaaniki Cheppi"	Kosaraju	Ghantasala, P. Susheela	5:24
"Ekkadi Dongalu Akkadane Gapchup"	Sri Sri	Ghantasala, P. Susheela	3:35
"Niluvave Vaalu Kanuladhana"	Kosaraju	Ghantasala, P. Susheela	3:13
"Chetulu Kalasina Chappatlu"	Arudra	Ghantasala, P. Susheela, Madhavapeddi Satyam	4:05
"Nedu Srivariki Memante"	Arudra	Ghantasala, P. Susheela	3:17
"Madhu Patram"	Arudra	Jikki	3:35
"Bhale Chancele"	Kosaraju	Madhavapeddi Satyam	3:03

== Remakes ==
Illarikam was remade in four languages. L. V. Prasad produced the Hindi version titled Sasural (1961), which T. Prakash Rao directed. It was again remade in Hindi as Ghar Jamai (1992). A. V. Subbarao himself remade it in Kannada as Mane Aliya (1964), in Malayalam as Kalithozhan (1966) and in Tamil as Maadi Veettu Mappilai (1967). All these versions were box office hits.
