= Saritha (film) =

- Directed by: P. Govindan
- Written by: J. C. George
- Screenplay by: J. C. George
- Produced by: Suvarna Regha
- Starring: Madhu; Vidhubala; Mohan Sharma; Bahadoor; Manju Bhargavi
- Cinematography: Madhu Ambat
- Music by: Shyam
- Release date: 13 March 1977
- Country: India
- Language: Malayalam

Saritha is an Indian Malayalam film, directed by P. Govindan and produced by Suvarna Regha in 1977 . The film stars Madhu, Vidhubala, Mohan Sharma, Bahadoor and Manju Bhargavi in the lead roles. The film has musical score by Shyam.

== Cast ==
- Madhu
- Vidhubala
- Mohan Sharma
- Bahadoor
- Manju Bhargavi
- M. G. Soman

== Soundtrack ==
The music was composed by Shyam and the lyrics were written by Sathyan Anthikkad.

No.	Song	Singers	Lyrics	Duration
1	"Hemanthathin"	S. Janaki	Sathyan Anthikkad	3:21
2	"Mazhathullithulli"	K. J. Yesudas	Sathyan Anthikkad	3:19
3	"Ormayundo"	P. Jayachandran, Mallika Sukumaran	Sathyan Anthikkad	3:11
4	"Pooveyil Mayangum"	P. Susheela	Sathyan Anthikkad	3:26
