= Vinod Kumar Alva =

Indian actor (born 1963)

- Born: Vinod Kumar Alva; 1 April 1963 (age 63); Mangalore, Mysore State (Now Karnataka), India
- Occupation: Actor
- Years active: 1984–present

Vinod Kumar Alva (born 1 April 1963) is an Indian actor who has worked predominantly in Telugu cinema and appeared in Kannada, Tamil and Malayalam films. He is known as Vinod Kumar in Telugu film industry. He hails from Puttur in Dakshina Kannada district of Karnataka in India. He is known for his roles in Telugu films like Karthavyam (1990), Seetharatnam Gari Abbayi (1992) and Police Brothers (1994).

== Filmography ==
=== Telugu ===
- Mayadari Mogudu (1984)
- Bharatha Naari (1989)
- Mouna Poratam (1989)
- Adavilo Abhimanyudu (1989)
- Neti Dowrjanyam (1990)
- Navayugam (1990)
- Judgement (1990)
- Karthavyam (1990)
- Raktha Jwala (1990)
- Mamagaru (1991)
- Bharat Bandh (1991)
- Niyantha (1991)
- Manchi Roju (1991)
- Samarpana (1992)
- Gangwar (1992)
- Seetharatnam Gari Abbayi (1992)
- Attasommu Alludu Danam (1992)
- Bangaru Mama (1992)
- Champion (1992)
- Khaidi Pratap (1992)
- Attaku Koduku Mamaku Alludu (1993)
- Prema Samaram (1993)
- Rajadhani (1993)
- Shabhash Ramu (1993)
- Mogudu Garu (1993)
- Srivari Priyuralu (1994)
- O Tandri O Koduku (1994)
- Police Brothers (1994)
- Police Lockup (1994)
- Mayadari Kutumbam (1995)
- Lady Boss (1995)
- Amma Naa Kodala (1995)
- Tata Manavadu (1996)
- Bobbili Bullodu (1996)
- Prema Prayanam (1996)
- Amma Ammani Choodalani Undi (1996)
- Rayudugaru Nayudugaru (1996)
- Veerudu (1996)
- Vammo Vatto O Pellaamo (1997)
- Panjaram (1997)
- Bharata Ratna (1999)
- Maa Balaji (1999)
- Sambayya (1999)
- Prema Sandadi (2001)
- Anna Sainyam (2001)
- Bharat Ratna (2002)
- Prema Donga (2002)
- Shanti Sandesham (2004)
- Asadhyudu (2006)
- Samanyudu (2006)
- Gopi – Goda Meeda Pilli (2006)
- Maharajashri (2007)
- Toss (2007)
- Donga Sachinollu (2008)
- Deepavali (2008)
- Kalidasu (2008)
- Punnami Naagu (2009)
- 18, 20 Love Story (2009)
- Samarthudu (2009)
- Bhageerathudu (2010)
- Sakthi (2011) as Prachanda
- Babloo (2011)
- Cricket Girls & Beer (2011)
- Tuneega Tuneega (2012)
- Srimannarayana (2012)
- Mahankali (2013)
- Potugadu (2013)
- Chandee (2013)
- Adavi Kaachina Vennela (2014)
- Rudhramadevi (2015)
- Red Alert (2015)
- Sati Timmamamba (2016)
- Pidugu (2016)
- Yuddham Sharanam (2017)
- Jayadev (2017)
- Yatra (2019)
- Katha Kanchiki Manam Intiki (2022)
- Dharmasthali (2022)
- Raajadhani Files (2024)
- Aay (2024)
- Krishna Leela (2025)
- Son Of (2026)

=== Kannada ===
- Thavaru Mane (1986)
- Namma Ooru Devathe (1986)
- Thaliya Aane (1987)
- Bhoomi Thayane (1988)
- Dharma Pathni (1988)
- Sahasa Veera (1988)
- Thayi Karulu (1988)
- Thayiya Aase (1988)
- Krishna Mechida Radhe (1988)
- Madhuri (1989)
- Bala Hombale (1989)
- Hosa Kavya (1989)
- Maha Yuddha (1989)
- Singari Bangari (1989)
- Thaligaagi (1989)
- Kadina Veera (1990)
- Amar Akbar Anthony (1998)
- Mafia (2001)
- Neelambari (2001)
- Kullara Loka (2002)
- Police Dog (2002)
- Punjabi House (2002)
- Thrishakthi (2002)
- Thalwar (2003)
- Border (2003)
- Shri Kalikamba (2003)
- Pandava (2004)...Prakash
- Yaake (2005)
- Gadipar (2005)
- Onti Mane (2010)
- Power (2014)
- Red Alert (2015)
- Bairagee (2022)
- Kaatera (2023)

=== Tamil ===
- Nyayangal Jayikkattum (1990)
- Hero (1994)
- Game (2002)
- Ji (2005)

=== Malayalam ===
- Aalilakkuruvikal (1988)
- High Alert (2015)
- Sathya (2017)

=== Television ===
Year	Title	Role	Channel
2022	9 Hours	Viswanath	Disney+ Hotstar

== Awards ==
- 1991 - Nandi Award for Best Supporting Actor - Mamagaru
