= Chilaka Gorinka =

- Theatrical release poster
- Directed by: K. Pratyagatma
- Produced by: K. Pratyagatma
- Starring: Anjali Devi; S. V. Ranga Rao; Krishna Kumari; Krishnam Raju
- Music by: S. Rajeswara Rao
- Release date: 1966
- Country: India
- Language: Telugu

Chilaka Gorinka is a 1966 Indian Telugu-language film produced and directed by K. Pratyagatma. The film stars Anjali Devi, S. V. Ranga Rao, Krishna Kumari and Krishnam Raju. It won the Nandi Award for Best Feature Film from the government of Andhra Pradesh. Sri Sri wrote the lyrics for the film, while S. Rajeswara Rao provided the music score. This is the debut film for actor and politician Krishnam Raju in a villainous role and also the Telugu debut for the comedian Rama Prabha.

== Cast ==
- Anjali Devi as Shanta
- S. V. Ranga Rao as Sanjeeva Rao
- Krishna Kumari as K. Usha Devi
- Krishnam Raju as Raja
- Vasanti as Saraswati "Sarasa"
- Ramana Reddy as Papa Rao
- Padmanabham as Bhadram
- Rama Prabha as Shashi
- Kakarala as Sanyasi
- Nirmalamma as Usha's mother
- Chadalavada as Nawabu

== Soundtrack ==
All lyrics are written by Sri Sri; all music is composed by S. Rajeswara Rao.

No.	Title	Singer(s)	Length
1.	"Bottu Bottuga"	Ghantasala
2.	"Erupekkenu Chakkani Nee Chekkili"	Ghantasala
3.	"Naa Raani Kanulalone"	Ghantasala
4.	"Nene Raayanchanai"	Ghantasala
5.	"Papa Kathavinu Baagavinu"	Ghantasala, P. Susheela, Baby Kowsalya
6.	"Erupekkenu Chakkani Nee Chekkili"	P. Susheela
7.	"Nene Rayanchenai Cheri"	P. Susheela, S. Janaki
8.	"Nadu Nadu Nadasera"	P. Susheela, Jayadev

== Accolades ==
- Nandi Award for Second Best Feature Film - Silver won by Kotayya Pratyagatma.
