= Thayige Thakka Maga =

1978 Indian Kannada sports action drama film

- Poster
- Directed by: V. Somashekhar
- Written by: Anjaneya Pushpananda
- Screenplay by: M. D. Sundar
- Produced by: Parvathamma Rajkumar
- Starring: Rajkumar; Savitri; Padmapriya; Sowcar Janaki
- Cinematography: P. S. Prakash
- Edited by: P. Bhaktavatsalam
- Music by: T. G. Lingappa
- Production company: Poornima Enterprises
- Release date: 13 December 1978
- Running time: 177 minutes
- Country: India
- Language: Kannada

Thayige Thakka Maga ( transl. Like Mother Like Son) is a 1978 Indian Kannada-language sports action film directed by V. Somashekhar and produced by Parvathamma Rajkumar. It is based on the story written by Anjaneya Pushpanand.

The film starred Rajkumar as a boxer along with Savitri, Padmapriya and Sowcar Janaki. Veteran Tamil-Telugu actress Savitri plays one of the title role of Thayi (Mother) in this film. The dialogues and lyrics are written by Chi. Udaya Shankar. The movie saw a theatrical run of 25 weeks.

The film was remade in Telugu as Puli Bidda (1981) and in Hindi as Main Intequam Loonga (1982) starring Dharmendra.

== Cast ==
- Dr. Rajkumar as Boxer Kumar
  - Master Lohith as Young Kumar
- Padmapriya as Mala
- Savitri as Vishalakshamma, Kumar's mother
- Sowcar Janaki as Annapoorna
- T. N. Balakrishna as Ramanagara Kuppuswamy
- Shakti Prasad as Boxer Vishwanath, Kumar's father
- Thoogudeepa Srinivas as Robert
- Prabhakar as Anthony
- Ceylon Manohar as Manohar
- Bhimaraju as Bhimaraj
- Rajanand
- Shani Mahadevappa
- Chi. Udaya Shankar as Doctor
- Sampath (actor) as Mala's father
- Uma Shivakumar
- Mamatha Shenoy as Rani

== Soundtrack ==
The music was composed by T. G. Lingappa with lyrics by Chi. Udaya Shankar.

Track listing
No.	Title	Singer(s)	Length
1.	"Entha Sogasu"	Rajkumar
2.	"Suryana Kanthige"	Rajkumar, Kasthuri Shankar
3.	"Vishwanathanu Thandeyadare"	Rajkumar
4.	"Chali Chali"	Rajkumar, S. Janaki
