= Sasural (1961 film) =

- Poster
- Directed by: T. Prakash Rao
- Screenplay by: Inder Raj Anand
- Story by: Vempati Sadasivabrahmam
- Based on: Illarikam (1959)
- Produced by: L. V. Prasad
- Starring: Rajendra Kumar; B. Saroja Devi
- Cinematography: Dwarka Divecha
- Edited by: Shivaji Awdhut
- Music by: Shankar–Jaikishan
- Production company: Prasad Productions
- Release date: 1961
- Country: India
- Language: Hindi

Sasural (transl. Home of In-laws, or chez in-laws) is a 1961 Indian Hindi-language film produced by L. V. Prasad and directed by T. Prakash Rao. The film stars Rajendra Kumar, B. Saroja Devi, Mehmood and Lalita Pawar. The music is by Shankar–Jaikishan and songs were penned by Hasrat Jaipuri and Shailendra. It is a remake of the Telugu film Illarikam (1959). The film became a box office success.

== Plot ==
Shekhar lives a poor lifestyle along with his maternal uncle Dharamdas, his aunt, cousin Sita – who is separated from her husband, Mahesh; and also has a sister Gauri, who had eloped with her lover and who everyone believes is dead. He studies in college along with wealthy fellow collegian, Bela. The two do not get along, but that changes when Bela's father, Thakur, discovers Shekhar's good character and thinks that he will be a suitable son-in-law. He approaches Dharamdas and arranges their marriage on the condition that Shekhar will become a ghar jamai (a son-in-law who resides with his wife's family), to which Dharamdas and Shekhar agree. Bela's mom is however displeased, as she would like her daughter to marry Rajan Murari, the son of their employee, Govindram. Despite this, the marriage does take place and Shekhar moves in with his in-laws, is employed by Thakur, and the family settles down to a fairly harmonious relationship. Their idyllic lifestyle is shattered when Bela suspects, and then discovers evidence, that Sita and Mahesh, who are now reunited, have stolen her diamond necklace; that Shekhar is having an affair with a dancing girl; that he has embezzled Rs.10,000/- and had gone to an undisclosed location for three days. Things deteriorate when Thakur meets with an accident, and subsequently passes away – paving the way for his wife to arrange her daughter's divorce and Shekhar's death.

== Cast ==
- Rajendra Kumar as Shekhar
- Saroja Devi as Bela
- Mehmood as Mahesh
- Lalita Pawar as Bela's mother
- Shubha Khote as Sita
- Jayshree Gadkar as Gauri
- Leela Mishra as Dharamdas' wife (as Leela Misra)
- Bipin Gupta as Thakur
- Wasti as Govindram Murari
- Anwar Hussain as Rajan 'Rajey' Murari
- Dhumal as Dharamdas
- Ratnamala as Thakur's sister
- Randhir as Thakur's Munim
- Moolchand as Thanedar

== Soundtrack ==
#	Title	Singer(s)
1	"Teri Pyari Pyari Soorat Ko"	Mohammed Rafi
2	"Kya Mil Gaya Hay Kya Kho Gaya"	Mohammed Rafi, Lata Mangeshkar
3	"Sun Le Meri Payal Ke Geet"	Lata Mangeshkar
4	"Yeh Albela Taur Na Dekha"	Mohammed Rafi
5	"Sata Le Ae Jahan"	Mukesh
6	"Apni Ulfat Pe Zamane Ka"	Mukesh, Lata Mangeshkar
7	"Jana Tumhare Pyar Mein"	Mukesh
8	"Ek Sawal Main Karoon"	Mohammed Rafi, Lata Mangeshkar

== Awards and nominations ==
9th Filmfare Awards Won:

- Filmfare Best Male Playback Award for Mohammed Rafi singing "Teri Pyari Pyari surat"

Nominated:

- Filmfare Award for Best Lyricist: Hasrat Jaipuri for "Teri Pyari Pyari Surat"
- Filmfare Award for Best Supporting Actor: Mehmood
- Filmfare Award for Best Supporting Actress: Shubha Khote
