= Yamanukku Yaman =

1980 film by D. Yoganand

- Theatrical release poster
- Directed by: D. Yoganand
- Written by: A. L. Narayanan (dialogues)
- Based on: Yamagola by D. V. Narasa Raju
- Produced by: C. Krishnaveni
- Starring: Sivaji Ganesan; Sripriya
- Cinematography: M. A. Rahman
- Edited by: K. Gopalrao
- Music by: K. Chakravarthy
- Production company: Lakshmi Narasimha Pictures
- Release date: 16 May 1980
- Country: India
- Language: Tamil

Yamanukku Yaman (transl. Killer of killers) is a 1980 Indian Tamil-language fantasy comedy film directed by D. Yoganand. Starring Sivaji Ganesan and Sripriya, it is a remake of the 1977 Telugu film Yamagola. The film was released on 16 May 1980, and became a box-office bomb.

== Plot ==
Sathyamoorthy, the idealistic and principled village panchayat president, wins the election against the corrupt and influential landlord, Aarumugam. Sathyamoorthy is also in love with Savithri, Arumugam's daughter. Determined to bring progress and justice to the village, Sathyamoorthy becomes a reformer and fights for the rights of the people, becoming a thorn in Aarumugam’s side as he champions the rights of the poor. Eventually, Aarumugam orchestrates Sathyamoorthy’s murder to eliminate his rival once and for all, but death is only the beginning.

In heaven, Sathyamoorthy points out the hypocritical behaviour of Indran, the king of the gods. As punishment for his insolence, he is cast down to hell. He quickly organises Yaman's workers to unionise and fight for their rights. He also convinces Yaman to take a break from his celestial duties, and in surprising plot twist, Sathyamoorthy is granted a second chance at life. He returned to Earth where he plans to reclaim his life, and deliver poetic justice to Aarumugam.

== Cast ==
- Sivaji Ganesan as Yaman and Sathyamoorthy alias Sathya
- Sripriya as Savithiri
- Pandari Bai as Sathyamoorthy's mother
- V. K. Ramasamy as Aarumugam
- Major Sundarrajan as Indran
- Thengai Srinivasan as Chitragupta
- V. S. Raghavan
- R. S. Manohar as C.I.D. Sivanandam
- M. R. R. Vasu as Kanthasamy
- Jayamalini as Rambhai
- Y. G. Mahendran as Sinner in Hell
- Junior Balaiah as Sinner in Hell
- Typist Gopu as Yamadhoota
- Pushpalatha as Savithiri's mother

== Soundtrack ==
The music was composed by K. Chakravarthy.

Song	Singers
"Mazhai Vizhundhadhu"	S. P. Balasubrahmanyam, P. Susheela
"Aathoram Pootha"	S. P. Balasubrahmanyam, P. Susheela
"Naadaga Sangeetha"	S. P. Balasubrahmanyam, P. Susheela
"Poo Mottu Ponnu Ithu"	S. P. Balasubrahmanyam, P. Susheela
"Yamanukku Yaman"	T. M. Soundararajan, S. P. Balasubrahmanyam
"Yamalogathil Indru"	S. P. Balasubrahmanyam

== Release and reception ==
Yamanukku Yaman was released on 16 May, 1980. P. S. M. of Kalki praised Ganesan's performance in the role of Yaman and added that those who are looking for a strong storyline should keep looking, its just a comedy for a change. The film became a box-office bomb.
