= Deepa Sashindran =

Indian artist (born 1974)

Deepa Narayanan Sashindran
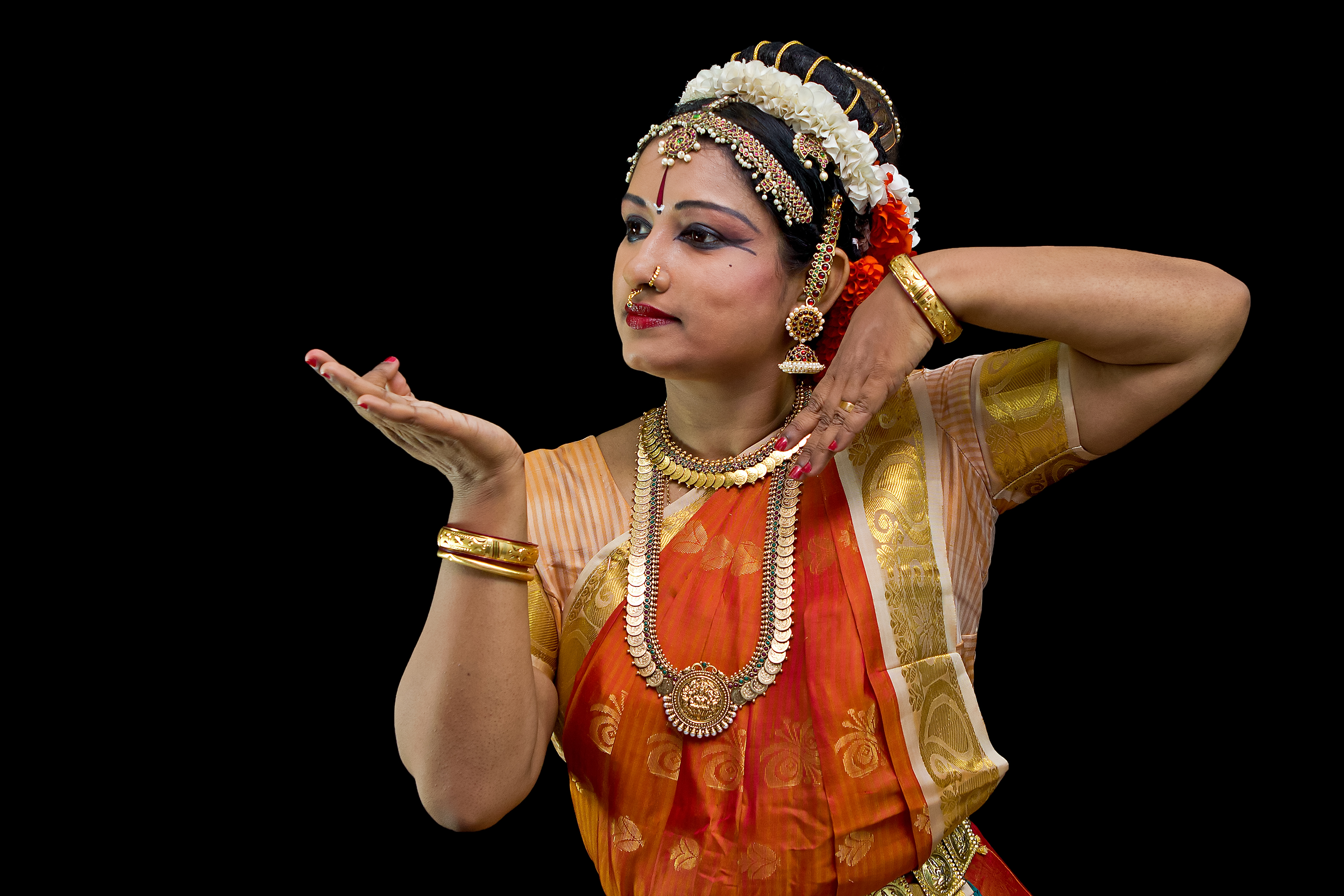
- Born: Deepa Narayanan Nair; 3 July 1974 (age 52); Bangalore, Karnataka, India
- Citizenship: Indian
- Education: B.A.L, LL.B, PGD-IRPM
- Alma mater: Bangalore University
- Occupations: Dancer, Choreographer, Teacher, Curator, Activist, Entrepreneur, Mentor
- Years active: 4 decades
- Known for: Kuchipudi Dancer
- Spouse: Sashindran Nair
- Children: 2 (One son and one daughter)
- Parent(s): Sri. Narayanan Nair and Smt Sridevi
- Website: kuchipudiparamparafoundation.com

Deepa Sashindran (born 3 July 1974) is an Indian artist and a disciple of the Kuchipudi expert Smt. Manju Bhargavi. She is a performing artist, teacher of the Indian classical dance form Kuchipudi, choreographer, art curator, entrepreneur, and the founder of Kuchipudi Parampara Foundation Trust Bangalore.

== Early life and education ==
Deepa Sashindran started the classical dance form of Bharatanatyam at the age of 5 under the Gurus Kalamandalam Usha Datar and Dr. Savithri Ramaiah. From the age of 8, she started learning the Kuchipudi form of dance under the renowned Kuchipudi expert Smt. Manju Bhargavi and continued studying under her for three decades. She also trained with Guru Vempati Ravi Shankar on new innovations. Currently, Sashindran is creating finer nuances of the art-form with the Kuchipudi Parampara Foundation Trust, which she established in Bangalore.

== Career ==
Deepa Sashindran is a versatile artist of the Kuchipudi dance style who has practiced the art-form for close to four decades. She has received many accolades for her vivacious dance techniques and spellbound solo performances. She has also had lead roles in dance dramas and performed alongside her Guru on many prestigious festivals and occasions. The government of Karnataka's Kuchipudi textbook committee has incorporated her dance pictures into the Kuchipudi text book of that state.

The First International Kuchipudi Dance Conference of North America, which was held in Houston and organized by Samskriti, invited Sashindran to render solo performances. She has conducted workshops and performances at Doha, Dubai, and Abu Dhabi. The Festival of India at Bahrain, organized by the Ministry of Culture, invited an ensemble led by Sashindran to perform.

Sashindran has carved a niche for herself with original choreographic works that include numerous authentic solo repertoires, as well as features and dance dramas such as Shivaleela, Dakshayagnam, Jayadeva Dashavatharam, Agnijyotsna, PanchaNayikas, Sri Venkatadri Vaibhavam (Annamacharya TTD Project), Nadhi Highland river, Sampoorna Adhyatma Ramayana, Nandanar Charitam with over 28 shows in India including 7 chennai sabhas, Soorya Choreography Festival Trivandrum, Kerala Kalamandalam, West Bengal State Music and Dance Academy, Madhya Pradesh Govt, Telangana Govt, and many others including cities of USA at Detroit, Yuva Bharathi Palo Alto, Richmond, Cleveland Thyagaraja festival and so forth. She teaches students In India, Europe, USA, Australia, South Korea, the UAE, and South Africa.

Sashindran has also helped organize innovative dance festivals such as NatyaVedam, Natya Parampara Utsav, Guru Vandana, and the Art Cafe series. She has helped organize workshops, lectures, and demonstrations. Curated Navotthana for First Rotary South Asia International Peace Conference with over 140 artists from India, Sri Lanka, Nepal, Bhutan supported by ICCR and Indian High Commission Colombo.

She has received many awards and recognitions from such as FKCCI ( Federation of Karnataka chambers and Commerce Industry), EMERG Karnataka first women entrepreneurs group, the Best Kuchipudi Artiste of Karnataka from Yuvaranga, the Nritya Shiromani National Award, the Sathyabhama Award from Kuchipudi danseuse Padmasri -Sobha Naidu at Visakhapatnam. Garden University honored her with the International Women Achievers Award, and she has also been honored by the Philanthropic Society of India, Nanma Kerala and countless art organisations across the country in her 4 decades. She is an accredited artist of Doordarshan, an empaneled artist of the Festivals of India Abroad, a co-opted member of Karnataka NrithyakalaParishath, an interim faculty member at Alliance University, and an examiner at Reva University.

Aside from dance, Sashindran is a law graduate with a PGD in industrial relations and personal management, a human resources specialist for over 25yrs in the software industry, an entrepreneur in Human Capital Management Services. She founded the company Karma Kreators which has successfully engaged with well-known startups and mid-sized companies like Pricewaterhouse Coopers, Samsung, MISys, Subex, Sasken, and others. She has also taken up social responsibilities as an Rotarian including President ar Rotary Bangalore Rajmahal Vilas.

== Kuchipudi Parampara Foundation ==
The Kuchipudi Parampara Foundation, founded by Deepa Sashindran, is a non-profit trust intended to propagate and promote the Kuchipudi form of classical dance. The Foundation offers systematic training, including master classes in Bangalore and Calicut to cultivate artists of high caliber. The activities of the foundation include not only classes, workshops, performances, productions, and festivals but also other endeavors for the propagation of the art form devised by its professionally run advisory committee.

The foundation also holds master classes at Sri Kaithapram Damodaran Namboothiri’s Swathi Kala Kendram at Calicut, Kerala. Many veteran artists of calicut have attended.

In 2014, the Kuchipudi Parampara Foundation held their first "Divinity in Kuchipudi" festival entitled Natya Parampara Utsav. The festival included eminent Kuchipudi artists such as the senior Guru of Kuchipudi Village with over 12 editions.

The Foundation produced the inaugural dance drama presentation "Agnijyotsna" about Queen Draupadi. It received rave reviews for its conception, lyrics, music, choreography, and presentation. This production also paved the way for new character innovation without deviating from the purity of the dance form.

The youngest member of the academy, the child prodigy Lakshmika, was featured on the editorial page of the latest 2014 attendance book "Telugu Traditions". This book was written in part by Ashish Mohan Khokar and guest edited by Padmasri Ananda Shankar Jayant.

Many original works includes numerous solo repertoires, features, dance dramas

Highland River commissioned by Colorado Fine Arts Association, US

Sampoorna Adhyatma Ramayana based on the works of 17th century scholar Munipalle Subramanya Kavi presented as Leela Natanam.

Nandanar Charitam Kuchipudi Dance drama with over 28 shows apart from Bangalore performing at the Invitation of 7 Chennai Sabhas in presence of Art Patrons like Dr Nalli Kuppuswamychetty and senior stalwart Gurus, Artists of Chennai, West Bengal State Music and Dance Academy, Siddhartha Kala Peetam Vjaywada, Ujjain Mahakal for Madhya Pradesh Govt, Mysore National Dance Drama Festival, Soorya Ganesham Trivandrum in the presence of Sri Soorya Krishnamoorthy . Srisailam Temple one of the 12 Jyothirlingams .Kerala Kalamandalam, at Soorya Choreography Festival Trivandrum (2nd repeat show) and at the very own Thirpungur Shivaloganathar temple for Shivarathri, Hassan, Telangana state culture department soforth .

Nandanar Charitam toured US 2024 and was presented at Detroit Michigan, Richmond Virginia, Yuvabharathi Palo Alto California, Cleveland Thyagaraja Utsav April 2025 and few more shows scheduled to be presented in different cities of US

Conceived and Choreographed by Deepa Sashindran Produced by Kuchipudi Parampara Foundation Trust Bengaluru.

Recognised with grants by Sangeet Natak Akademi New Delhi and Kannada and Culture Govt of Karnataka

== Dance festivals ==
=== Natya Vedam Annual Dance Festival - 2012 ===
Deepa Sashindran organized the Natya Vedam Annual Dance Festival 2012 on 18 and 19 May as a tribute to her Dance Guru, Manju Barggavee. The event was held in Bangalore and featured eminent artists of classical and contemporary dance forms.

=== Natya Parampara Utsav - 2014 till date ===
The foundation has organized Natya Parampara Utsav for the promotion of the arts. For example, the event "Divinity in Kuchipudi" was held on 24–25 May 2014 at Bhartiya Vidya Bhavan, Bangalore and featured eminent artists of the Kuchipudi dance forms.

Art Cafe Conversation series based on works of Indian classical music composers and adapted to dance.

Curated Navotthana for First Rotary South Asia International Peace Conference with over 140 artists from India, Sri Lanka, Nepal, Bhutan supported by ICCR and Indian High Commission Colombo.

== Awards and Credentials ==
- FKCCI - Federation of Karnataka chambers and Commerce Industry
- EMERG Bangalore's oldest women entrepreneurs group
- Best Kuchipudi Artiste Yuva Ranga
- Nritya Shiromani National Award
- Sathyabhama Excellence Award
- Nrithya Vilasini
- Natya Kousthuba
- International Women Achievers of Bangalore award by Garden City University
- Honored by the Philanthropic Society of India
- Honored by Exide Life Insurance Company Ltd
- Best Institution Recognition Bangalore Times
- Countless Recognition from art organisations all over India last 4 decades
