= K. Pratyagatma =

Indian film director and journalist (1925–2001)

- Born: Kolli Pratyagatma; 31 October 1925; Gudivada, Andhra Pradesh, India
- Died: 8 June 2001 (aged 75); Hyderabad, Andhra Pradesh
- Occupations: Indian film journalist, director and producer
- Spouse: Satyavati
- Children: K. Vasu (known for introducing Chiranjeevi), Tejolatha, Kalidas
- Writing career
- Genres: Journalist, Writer, Director, Producer
- Notable works: Bharya Bhartalu, Kula Gotralu, Manushulu Mamathalu

K. Pratyagatma (born Kolli Kotayya Pratyagatma), also known as K. P. Atma (31 October 1925 – 8 June 2001) was an Indian film journalist, director and producer known for his works in Telugu and Hindi cinema. He has garnered three National Film Awards.

== Personal life ==
He was born on 31 October 1925 in Gudivada, Andhra Pradesh, India. Director K. Vasu is his son. He is also survived by his wife Satyavati, a daughter Tejo Latha in Bangalore and a son Kalidas in the United States. He died on 8 June 2001 in Hyderabad, India. K. Vasu directed about 12 movies in his film career, topping of it being Sri Shirdi Saibaba Mahatyam, with Vijayachander in the lead role that went on to become a super hit and is evergreen movie attracting good TRP when it is telecast on TV even now. K. Vasu also known for introducing megastar Chiranjeevi to industry through his movie Pranam Khareedu. This is Chiranjeevi's first released movie.

== Journalist ==
Before entering the film industry, he worked as a journalist for magazine Prajasakti in 1952 and as an editor for the magazine Jwala.

== Cinema ==
His debut film was Bharya Bhartalu in 1961. He has directed about 30 films in Telugu and Hindi and also produced a few films under Atma Arts. His film Raja Aur Runk went on to become a silver jubilee. He introduced Krishnam Raju to the film industry with his Nandi Award winning Telugu film Chilaka Gorinka in 1966.

== Awards ==
National Film Awards

- 1961: President's Silver Medal for Best Feature Film in Telugu - Bharya Bharthalu
- 1962: Certificate of Merit for the Second Best Feature Film in Telugu - Kula Gothralu
- 1965: Certificate of Merit for the Third Best Feature Film in Telugu - Manushulu Mamathalu

Nandi Awards

- Nandi Award for Second Best Feature Film - Silver - Chilaka Gorinka (1966)
- Nandi Award for Second Best Story Writer - Aadarsa Kutumbam (1969)

== Filmography ==
=== Director ===
Telugu

1. Nayakudu Vinayakudu (1980)
2. Kamalamma Kamatam (1979)
3. Kannavaari Illu (1978)
4. Manchi Manasu (1978)
5. Gadusu Ammayi (1977)
6. Alludochchaadu (1976)
7. Attavaarillu (1976)
8. Deeksha (1974)
9. Mugguru Ammayilu (1974)
10. Palletoori Bava (1973)
11. Stree (1973)
12. Srimanthudu (1971)
13. Manasu Mangalyam (1970)
14. Aadarsa Kutumbam (1969)
15. Maa Vadina (1967)
16. Chilaka Gorinka (1966)
17. Manushulu Mamathalu (1965)
18. Manchi Manishi (1964)
19. Punarjanma (1963)
20. Kula Gotralu (1962)
21. Bharya Bhartalu (1961)

Hindi

1. Do Ladkiyan (1976)
2. Mehmaan (1973)
3. Ek Nari Ek Brahmachari (1971)
4. Bachpan (1970)
5. Tamanna (1969)
6. Raja Aur Runk (1968)
7. Chhota Bhai (1966)

=== Writer ===
1. Alludochchaadu (1976)
2. Bachpan (1970)
3. Raja Aur Runk (1968)
4. Punarjanma (1963)
5. Illarikam (1959)
6. Jayam Manade (1956)
7. Nirupedalu (1954)

=== Producer ===
1. Bachpan (1970)
2. Chilaka Gorinka (1966)
