= T. Rama Rao =

Indian filmmaker (1938–2022)

- Born: Tatineni Rama Rao; 29 May 1938; Kapileswarapuram, Madras Presidency, British Raj
- Died: 20 April 2022 (aged 83); Chennai, Tamil Nadu, India
- Occupation: Film director

Tatineni Rama Rao (29 May 1938 – 20 April 2022) was an Indian filmmaker. He directed 75 Hindi and Telugu feature films between 1966 and 2000.

== Career ==
Rao started his work in the film industry in the late 1950s as the assistant director of his cousin T. Prakash Rao and Kotayya Pratyagatma, before making his directorial debut with 1966 Telugu film Navarathri.

According to Encyclopædia Britannica, Rao was "the man who established the 'Madras movie', or Hindi films funded primarily by southern capital, as a viable commercial option in the all-India market..."

He was the father of successful film producer T. Ajay Kumar.

== Filmography ==
=== Director ===
Year	Film	Language	Notes
1966	Navarathri	Telugu	Remake of Tamil film Navarathri
1968	Brahamchaari	Telugu	
1969	Manchi Mitrulu	Telugu	
1971	Suprutudu	Telugu	
1972	Raitu Kutumbam	Telugu	
1973	Jeevana Tarangalu	Telugu	
1974	Dorababu	Telugu	
1975	Yamagola	Telugu	
1975	Raju Vedale	Telugu	
1977	Aalu Magalu	Telugu	
1978	Amara Prema	Telugu	Remake of Malayalam film Madanolsavam. (Note: Some scenes were remade while most of the scenes dubbed from original version.)
1978	Sri Rama Raksha	Telugu	
1979	Lok Parlok	Hindi	Remake of Yamagola
1980	Aatagaadu	Telugu	
1980	Judaai	Hindi	Remake of Aalu Magalu
1980	Maang Bharo Sajana	Hindi	Remake of Karthika Deepam
1981	Ek Hi Bhool	Hindi	Remake of Mouna Geethangal
1982	Jeevan Dhaara	Hindi	Remake of Aval Oru Thodar Kathai
1982	Main Intaquam Loonga	Hindi	Remake of Thayige Thakka Maga
1982	Yeh To Kamaal Ho Gaya	Hindi	Remake of Sattam En Kaiyil
1982	Anuraga Devata	Telugu	Remake of Aasha
1983	Andhaa Kaanoon	Hindi	Remake of Sattam Oru Iruttarai
1983	Mugguru Monagallu	Telugu	Remake of Moondru Mugam
1983	Mujhe Insaaf Chahiye	Hindi	Remake of Nyayam Kavali
1984	Inquilaab	Hindi	Remake of Chakravyuha
1984	Yeh Desh	Hindi	Remake of Ee Nadu
1984	John Jani Janardhan	Hindi	Remake of Moondru Mugam
1985	Pachani Kapuram	Telugu	Remake of Pyar Jhukta Nahin
1985	Haqeeqat	Hindi	Remake of Chakravarthy
1986	Naseeb Apna Apna	Hindi	Remake of Gopurangal Saivathillai
1986	Sadaa Suhagan	Hindi	Remake of Dheerga Sumangali
1986	Dosti Dushmani	Hindi	Remake of Chakravarthy
1986	Naache Mayuri	Hindi	Remake of Mayuri
1987	Sansar	Hindi	Remake of Samsaram Adhu Minsaram
1987	Watan Ke Rakhwale	Hindi	
1987	Insaf Ki Pukar	Hindi	
1988	Nyayaniki Shiksha	Telugu	Remake of Neethikku Thandanai
1988	Agni Keratalu	Telugu	
1988	Khatron Ke Khiladi	Hindi	
1989	Sachai Ki Taqat	Hindi	
1990	Majboor	Hindi	
1990	Muqaddar Ka Badshaah	Hindi	
1991	Pratikar	Hindi	Remake of Raktha Tilakam
1991	Talli Tandrulu	Telugu	
1992	Golmaal Govindam	Telugu	
1993	Muqabla	Hindi	Remake of Police Bharya
1994	Mr. Azaad	Hindi	Remake of Ulle Veliye
1994	Mera Pyara Bharat	Hindi	
1995	Ravan Raaj	Hindi	Remake of Pulan Visaranai
1995	Haathkadi	Hindi	
1996	Jung	Hindi	
1999	Sautela	Hindi	Remake of Cheran Pandian
2000	Bulandi	Hindi	Remake of Nattamai
2000	Beti No. 1	Hindi	Remake of Aadyathe Kanmani

=== Producer ===
- Note: for other films, see Atluri Purnachandra Rao.

==== Tamil ====
- Dhill (2001)
- Youth (2002)
- Arul (2004)
- Unakkum Enakkum (2006)
- Malaikottai (2007)
- Ya Ya (2013)
