= T. Prakash Rao =

Indian film director

- Born: Tatineni Prakash Rao; 24 November 1924; Kapileswarapuram, Krishna district (now in Andhra Pradesh, India)
- Died: 1 July 1992 (aged 67); Chennai, India
- Occupation: Film Director/Producer
- Spouse: Annapurna
- Children: T. L. V. Prasad
- Relatives: Tatineni Satya (grandson); T. Rama Rao (cousin)

Tatineni Prakash Rao (24 November 1924 – 1 July 1992) was an Indian film director and screenwriter who worked in Telugu, Hindi, and Tamil films. In a career spanning nearly four decades, he directed over 40 films.

He started his career as an assistant director for films like Palnati Yuddham (1947), Shavukaru (1950), Pathala Bhairavi (1951). He debuted as a director with the Telugu film Palletooru (1952) and later directed Pichi Pullayya (1953), Parivartana (1954), Jayam Manade (1956), Charana Daasi (1956), Illarikam (1959) in Telugu. In Hindi, he directed films like Sasural (1961), Suraj (1966), Izzat (1968) and Duniya (1968). His notable Tamil films include Amara Deepam (1956), Uthama Puthiran (1958), Nalla Theerpu (1959), and Padagotti (1964).

== Early life ==
Tatineni Prakash Rao was born in Kapileswarapuram of Krishna district in present-day Andhra Pradesh. He was a member of the CPI before Indian Independence and was associated with Praja Natya Mandali, a radical theatre movement.

== Career ==
Later, Prakash Rao moved to Madras to join the film industry like many others who did not the like the turn of events in the Communist movement. He started his career as an assistant to L. V. Prasad for films like Palnati Yuddham (1947), Mana Desam (1949), Shavukaru (1950), Samsaram (1950). He also worked with K. V. Reddy for some time on Pathala Bhairavi (1951). He debuted as a director with the Telugu film Palletooru (1952).

== Personal life ==
Prakash Rao's wife Tatineni Annapurna (b. 1930) died on May 10, 2021, in Vijayawada at the age of 91 due to COVID-19.

His son T. L. V. Prasad is a film director while his daughter Leela settled in the US. Prakash Rao's grandson Tatineni Satya is also a film director who debuted with Bheemili Kabaddi Jattu (2010). Noted director Tatineni Rama Rao is a cousin of Prakash Rao. Rama Rao worked as an assistant director to Prakash Rao in the beginning of his career.

== Filmography ==
As a director

Year	Film	Language	Notes
1952	Palletooru	Telugu	Debut as a director
1953	Pichi Pullayya	Telugu	Adaptation and Story
1954	Parivartana	Telugu	
1954	Nirupedalu	Telugu	
1956	Amara Deepam	Tamil	
1956	Charana Daasi	Telugu	
1956	Jayam Manade	Telugu	
1956	Mathar Kula Manickam	Tamil	
1958	Amar Deep	Hindi	
1958	Uthama Puthiran	Tamil	
1958	Sitamgar	Hindi	Dubbed from Tamil Uttama Puthiran
1959	Illarikam	Telugu	
1959	Kanniraindha Kanavan	Tamil	
1959	Nalla Theerpu	Tamil	
1960	College Girl	Hindi	
1960	Ellorum Innaattu Mannar	Tamil	
1960	Maa Babu	Telugu	
1961	Anbu Magan	Tamil	
1961	Sasural	Hindi	
1962	Kaathiruntha Kangal	Tamil	
1963	Bahurani	Hindi	
1964	Padagotti	Tamil	
1965	Bahu Beti	Hindi	Scenario
1966	Suraj	Hindi	
1968	Duniya	Hindi	
1968	Izzat	Hindi	
1968	Vaasna	Hindi	
1969	Nannha Farishta	Hindi	
1970	Ghar Ghar Ki Kahani	Hindi	
1972	Rivaaj	Hindi	
1973	Minaru Babu	Hindi	
1974	Gali Patalu	Telugu	
1975	Samsaram	Telugu	
1976	Pogarubothu	Telugu	
1977	Chiranjeevi Rambabu	Telugu	
1978	Hamara Sansar	Hindi	
1979	Ganga Bhavani	Hindi	
1982	Engalalum Mudiyum	Tamil	
1988	Kab Tak Chup Rahungi	Hindi	

As an assistant director

Year	Film	Language
1947	Palnati Yuddham	Telugu
1948	Drohi	Telugu
1949	Mana Desam	Telugu
1950	Shavukaru	Telugu
1950	Samsaram	Telugu
1951	Samsaram	Tamil
1951	Pathala Bhairavi	Telugu
