= List of Telugu films of 1960 =

This is a list of films produced by the Tollywood film industry based in Hyderabad, India in 1960.

Title	Director	Cast	Music director	
Abhimanam	C. S. Rao	A. Nageswara Rao, Savitri, P. Kannamba, Chalam, Krishna Kumari	Ghantasala	
Anna Chellelu	B. Vittalacharya	J. V. Ramana Murthy, Devika, Meena Kumari, Rajanala	Rajan–Nagendra	
Annapurna	V. Madhusudhana Rao	Jaggayya, Jamuna, Gummadi	S. Dakshinamurthi	
Bhakta Raghunath	Samudrala Sr.	Kanta Rao, Jamuna	Ghantasala	
Bhakta Sabari	Ch. Narayana Murthy	Haranath, Ramakrishna, Krishna KUmari, Sobhan Babu, Rajasree, V. Nagayya, Pandaribai	Pendyala Nageswara Rao	
Bhatti Vikramarka	Chandrasekhara Rao Jampana	N. T. Rama Rao, Kanta Rao, Anjali Devi, Kanchana	Pendyala Nageswara Rao	
Chivaraku Migiledi	Gutha Ramineedu	Kanta Rao, Balayya, Savitri	Aswathamma	
Deepavali	Rajinikanth	N. T. Rama Rao, Savitri, Krishna Kumari	Ghantasala	
Devanthakudu	C. Pullaiah	N. T. Rama Rao, Krishna Kumari, S. V. Ranga Rao, Hemalatha	Aswathamma	
Dharmame Jayam	K. B. Nagabhushanam	Jaggayya, Jamuna, Gummadi, P. Kannamba	S. Hanumantha Rao	
Kanna Koothuru	D. Yoganand	A. Nageswara Rao, Anjali Devi, Baby Uma, Rajagopal, Dara Singh	M. Ranga Rao (Telugu)	
Jagannatakam	Sobhanadri Rao	Amarnath, Krishna Kumari, Girija	Aswathamma	
Jalsa Rayudu	Tapi Chanakya	Jaggayya, Jamuna, Gummadi, P. Kannamba	Master Venu	
Kadeddulu Ekaram Nela	Chandrasekhara Rao Jampana	N. T. Rama Rao, Sowcar Janaki	T. V. Raju	
Kanakadurga Pooja Mahima	B. Vittalacharya	Kanta Rao, Krishna Kumari	Rajan–Nagendra	
Kula Daivam	Kabir Das	Gummadi, Anjali Devi, Chalam, Girija	Pendyala Nageswara Rao	
Kumkuma Rekha	Tapi Chanakya	Jaggayya, Savitri, Balayya, M. Saroja	Master Venu	
Maa Babu	T. Prakash Rao	A. Nageswara Rao, Savitri, M. N. Rajam, Honey Irani	T. Chalapathi Rao	
Magavari Mayalu	Sobhanadri Rao	Amarnath, Krishna Kumari, Chalam, Rajasree	Nityanand	
Mahakavi Kalidasu	Kamalakara Kameswara Rao	A. Nageswara Rao, S. V. Ranga Rao, Sriranjani, Rajasulochana	Pendyala Nageswara Rao	
Mamaku Tagga Alludu	Vedantam Raghavayya	Savitri, S. V. Ranga Rao, Relangi, Girija, Pushpavalli	M. S. Prakash	
Mangalyam	B. S. Narayana	Kanta Rao, Devika, Ramakrishna, Rajasree	Ghantasala	
Nammina Bantu	Adurthi Subba Rao	A. Nageswara Rao, Savitri, S. V. Ranga Rao, Gummadi	S. Rajeswara Rao, Master Venu	
Nithya Kalyanam Paccha Thoranam	Pinisetti Srirama Murthy	Ramakrishna, Chalam, Krishna Kumari, Rajasree	Pendyala Nageswara Rao	
Pelli Kanuka	C. V. Sridhar	A. Nageswara Rao, B. Saroja Devi, Krishna Kumari	A. M. Rajah	
Pillalu Techina Challani Rajyam	B. R. Panthulu	B. R. Panthulu, M. V. Rajamma, K. Sarangapani	T. G. Lingappa	
Raja Makutam	B. N. Reddy	N. T. Rama Rao, Rajasulochana, Gummadi, P. Kannamba	Master Venu	Runaanubandham
Ramasundari	H. Krishnamurthy	Kanta Rao, Ramakrishna, Krishna Kumari, Rajasree	S. Dakshinamurthi	
Rani Ratnaprabha	B. A. Subba Rao	N.T.Rama Rao, Anjali Devi, Gummadi, Sandhya	S. Rajeswara Rao	
Renukadevi Mahatyam	K. S. Prakash Rao	Gummadi, G. Varalakshmi	L. Malleswara Rao	
Runanubandham	Vedantam Raghavayya	A. Nageswara Rao, Anjali Devi, Haranath in Dual Role	P. Adinarayana Rao	
Sahasra Siracheda Apoorva Chinthamani	S. D. Lal	Kanta Rao, Gummadi, Devika, Girija	K. V. Mahadevan	
Samajam	A. Narayana Rao	Jaggayya, Rajasulochana, Relangi, Girija	Ashwattama	
Shanthi Nivasam	C. S. Rao	A. Nageswara Rao, Rajasulochana, Kanta Rao, Krishna Kumari, Gummadi, Devika	Ghantasala	
Sri Krishna Rayabaram	Jagannadh	Raghuramaiah, Kanta Rao, Gummadi, Sandhya, Hemalatha	Aswathamma, Suri Babu	
Sri Venkateswara Mahatyam	P. Pullaiah	N. T. Rama Rao, Savitri, Gummadi, S. Varalakshmi	Pendyala Nageswara Rao	
Vimala	S. M. Sriramulu Naidu	N. T. Rama Rao, Savitri	S. M. Subbaiah Naidu	
