= Kandula Mallikarjuna Rao =

Kandula Mallikharjuna Rao
- Also known as: Mallik
- Born: 1921
- Origin: Machilipatnam, Krishna district, Andhra Pradesh, India.
- Died: 1996 (aged 74–75)
- Genres: Vocalist, Music composer
- Occupations: Singer, Music composer

Kandula Mallikharjuna Rao, better known as Mallik (1921–1996) was an Indian popular music composer and singer.

He was born in Machilipatnam, Krishna District, Andhra Pradesh, to K. Venkatachalam and Lakshmi Narasamma. His initial training in music was under the guidance of the late Krovi Satyanarayana. He served as a music composer and singer at All India Radio (AIR), Madras, for 30 years before transferring to AIR,Vijayawada. During his tenure at Akashvani, he composed numerous songs, including dance dramas, Bhakthi Ranjani pieces, and folk melodies. He was the first composer of many reputed Tallapaka Annamacharya Keerthanas. Examples of his notable compositions include 'Adigo Alladigo,' 'Thandhanana Aahi,' and 'Narayanathae Namo Namo.' He also created the renowned 'Raja Rajeshwari Astakam' and 'Hanuman Manjari.' The Kuchipudi dance drama Chandalika, choreographed by Dr. Vempati Chinna Satyam with music composed by Mallik, gained international acclaim for its exceptional musical score.

In addition to being a composer, he was also a playback singer for Telugu movies, including the films Sampoorna Ramayanam, Charana Daasi, Bhagya Rekha (1957), and Bangaru Papa.

He was awarded Nada Kaumudi by ex-Prime Minister P. V. Narsimha Rao and ex-Chief Minister N. T. Rama Rao for his excellence.

He accompanied as a singer for many dance ballads for Sri Vempati Chinna Satyam, Smt. Shobha Naidu, and Smt. Raja Sulochana. He also performed many individual programs.

He participated in T.T.D. Brahmotsavams for 50 years.

== Filmography ==
=== Composer ===
Year	Film	Language	Director	Banner	Notes
1955	Sri Jagannatha Mahatyamu	Telugu	Katuri Mohan Rao	Union Pictures	with B. Gopalam
1957	Sati Savitri	Telugu	K. B. Nagabhushanam	Varalakshmi Pictures	with M. Balamuralikrishna, P. Suribabu, S. Rajeswara Rao, Babu Rao, J. Lakshminarayana, H. R. Padmanabha Sastry & Master Venu
1961	Madanamanjari	Telugu	Jasubhai Trivedi	Srikrishna Balaji Films	with Pamarthi

=== Singer ===
Year	Film	Language	Song	Co-singers	Music director
1953	Manjari	Telugu	O Yuvaraja Tivarapatu Tagadoi	Y. Rukmini	H. R. Padmanabha Sastry
1955	Bangaru Papa	Telugu	Ghal Ghalluna Gajjala		Addepalli Rama Rao
1955	Bangaru Papa	Telugu	Bratuku Svapnamu Kaadhu		Addepalli Rama Rao
1955	Sri Jagannatha Mahatyamu	Telugu	Choopulathote	Krishna Kumar, V. Lakshmi, J. V. Raghavulu, Rama Rao, Govinda Rao, Padma Priya & Renuka Sr.	Mallik & B. Gopalam
1955	Sri Jagannatha Mahatyamu	Telugu	Jagannatha Swamy	A. M. Rajah, B. Gopalam, Venkatraju, Krishna Kumar, V. Lakshmi, Padma Priya & Renuka Sr.	Mallik & B. Gopalam
1955	Sri Jagannatha Mahatyamu	Telugu	Jayajagadeesha Hare	Prakash Rao, Venkateswarlu, V. Lakshmi, Padma Priya & Renuka Sr.	Mallik & B. Gopalam
1955	Sri Jagannatha Mahatyamu	Telugu	Navaiparthyam		Mallik & B. Gopalam
1955	Sri Jagannatha Mahatyamu	Telugu	Radharoodo Gacchin		Mallik & B. Gopalam
1955	Sri Jagannatha Mahatyamu	Telugu	Vandanamayya	Sowmitri, Krishna Kumar, J. V. Raghavulu, P. S. Vaidehi, V. Lakshmi, Padma Priya & Renuka Sr.	Mallik & B. Gopalam
1956	Charana Daasi	Telugu	Are Beta.... Bommalaata		S. Rajeswara Rao
1957	Bhagya Rekha	Telugu	Thirumala Mandhira		Pendyala Nageswara Rao
1958	Sri Krishna Garadi	Telugu	Gaduchu Bhayambu Dheenini		Pendyala Nageswara Rao
1958	Sri Krishna Garadi	Telugu	Gandeevam Devadatta		Pendyala Nageswara Rao
1958	Sri Krishna Garadi	Telugu	Ananyaschinta Yantho Mamyejanah		Pendyala Nageswara Rao
1958	Sri Krishna Garadi	Telugu	Gadusu Hayambuna Dheenini		Pendyala Nageswara Rao
1958	Sri Ramanjaneya Yuddham	Telugu	Bhandanabheemu Dartajanabandhu		Pendyala Nageswara Rao
1958	Veettukku Vandha Varalakshmi	Tamil	Thirupathi Meviya Sundhara		Pendyala Nageswara Rao
1958	Veettukku Vandha Varalakshmi	Tamil	Ennasai Raaja Evandaa	Jikki	Pendyala Nageswara Rao
1959	Sampoorna Ramayanam	Telugu	Thaponidhi Vishwamitruni Venuka		K. V. Mahadevan
1959	Sampoorna Ramayanam	Telugu	Sriramachandruni Pattabhisheka Mahotsavam	Madhavapeddi Satyam, Pithapuram Nageswara Rao, Jikki, Udutha Sarojini & K. Jamuna Rani	K. V. Mahadevan
1959	Sampoorna Ramayanam	Telugu	Annavu Pitruswamivai Nanu Odharchu		K. V. Mahadevan
1959	Sampoorna Ramayanam	Telugu	Paadukale Paadukale Paadukalae Kolichemu	P. B. Sreenivas	K. V. Mahadevan
1959	Sampoorna Ramayanam	Telugu	Chakkani Lanka Nagaramu		K. V. Mahadevan
1959	Sati Tulasi	Telugu	Sri Ramana Hey Shritha Karuna		Pamarthi
1960	Bhakta Sabari	Telugu	Challanga Mammelu Sabari Gangamma		Pendyala Nageswara Rao
1960	Bhakta Sabari	Telugu	Pandina Dehamandu Paripakvata		Pendyala Nageswara Rao
1960	Bhakta Sabari	Telugu	Bhavataraka Tarakanamahare	P. Susheela	Pendyala Nageswara Rao
1960	Raja Makutam	Telugu	Kanta Paini Aasa		Master Venu
1961	Sampoorna Ramayana	Telugu	Abhayamuma Dayaseyumachalavasa		Vasant Desai & Vijaya Bhaskar
1963	Lava Kusa	Telugu	Jagadabhi Ramudu Sriraamude	Ghantasala, P. Leela & P. Susheela	Ghantasala
1964	Babruvahana	Telugu	Durjaya Rajamandala		Pamarthi
1964	Ramadasu	Telugu	Adigo Badradri Idigo Choodandi	Ghantasala, P. B. Sreenivas & A. P. Komala	G. Ashwathama
1967	Rahasyam	Telugu	Ambaparaku Devi Paraku	J. V. Raghavulu, P. Susheela, P. Leela, Ghantasala, A. P. Komala, P. S. Vaidehi & M. S. Padma	Ghantasala
