= S. Varalakshmi =

Indian actress and singer

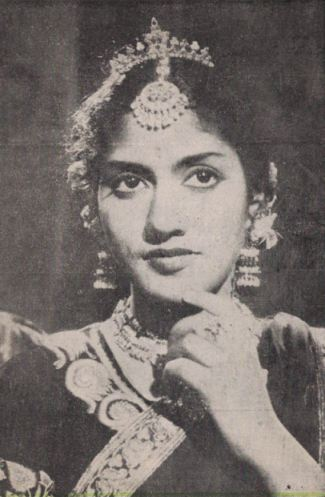
- S. Varalakshmi in 1951 Tamil film Saudamini
- Born: 13 August 1925; Jaggampeta, Madras Presidency, British India (now Andhra Pradesh, India)
- Died: 22 September 2009 (aged 84); Chennai, Tamil Nadu, India
- Occupations: Singer, actress
- Years active: 1935–1992
- Spouse: A. L. Srinivasan (m. 1952; died 1977)

Saridey Varalakshmi (13 August 1925 – 22 September 2009) was an Indian actress and singer who worked in Telugu and Tamil-language films. She was popular for her roles and songs in Telugu films like Sri Venkateswara Mahatyam (1960) and Mahamantri Timmarasu (1962) and Tamil films like Veerapandiya Kattabomman (1959) and Poova Thalaiya (1969).

== Life ==
Varalakshmi was born in Jaggampeta, Andhra Pradesh, India. She started her career as a child artist portraying a saint in Balayogini (1937), when she was nine years old. Gudavalli Ramabrahmam was engaged by the pioneer filmmaker K. Subramanyam to direct the Telugu version of this movie. He spotted young Varalakshmi in Kurnool. Subramanyam later cast her in his classic Seva Sadanam (1938) with M. S. Subbulakshmi. She played a young friend of the heroine (M.S.), and they became close friends. She played a young girl in Parasuraman (Tamil, 1940) along with T. R. Mahalingam. T. R. Sundaram, cast her in a major role in his box office hit 'Aayiram Thalai Vaangi Apoorva Chinthamani' (1947). The title role was played by V. N. Janaki. The film was a major success and Govindan and Varalakshmi made an attractive pair. T. R. Sundaram cast her again in the lead role in 'Bhojan' (1948). Her first successful movie was Balaraju in 1948 produced and directed by Ghantasala Balaramaiah. She later acted with all top heroes in Telugu and Tamil industries including M K Tyagaraja Bhagavatar in the classic Tamil film by B A Subba Rao called 'Syamala' in 1953; Sivaji Ganesan (Veerapandiya Kattabbomman), M. G. Ramachandran (Chakravarthi Thirumagal, Maattukara Velan, Needhikku Thalaivanangu), Gemini Ganesan (Poova Thalaiya, Panama Pasama), N. T. Rama Rao (Satya Harischandra), A. Nageswara Rao (ANR) (Balaraju), V. Nagayya (Naga Panchami), Ranjan (En Magan) and R. S. Manohar (Maamiyaar). She was also famous for her voice, and sung her songs in all movies she acted. Her roles as Sivaji's wife in Veerapandiya Kattabomman, and important roles in Poova Thalaiya, Savale Samali, Maattukkara Velan, Shivaji's sister in Raja Raja Chozhan and Neethikku thalaivanangu won her critical acclaim as a talented singer and actress in Tamil movies. In her later career, she acted in mother and aunt roles. She married film producer A. L. Srinivasan, an elder brother of Kavignar Kannadasan; they had two children named Nalini and Muruga She continued to act after marriage in senior roles in Telugu and Tamil cinema. She sang many songs in Telugu and Tamil films.

Her son, S. Muruga, died after suffering cardiac arrest in Chennai on 22 October 2013. He lived for 48 years.

Her daughter Nalini is a homemaker with 2 children.

== Death ==
Varalakshmi was bedridden during the last 6 months of her life after she fell and injured her back. She died on 22 September 2009.

== Honors and awards ==
She has received several awards commending her service to Tamil cinema. The most recent ones were:

1. Sivaji Ganesan Memorial Award Presented by the Sivaji Family in October 2007
2. Kavignar Kannadasan Award presented by the Tamil Nadu Government in 2004

== Filmography ==
Note: The lists are not comprehensive.

Year	Film	Language	Character
1937	Balayogini	Telugu	Child Saint
1938	Sevasadanam	Tamil	
1939	Raithu Bidda	Telugu	Beggar Girl
1940	Illalu	Telugu	
1940	Parasuramar	Tamil	
1942	Aaraichimani	Tamil	
1940	Sathi Murali	Tamil	
1944	Jagathalapratapan	Tamil	
1945	Mayalokam	Telugu	
1947	Palnati Yudham	Telugu	Maanchala
1947	Aayiram Thalai Vaangi Apoorva Chinthamani	Tamil	
1947	Thulasi Jalandar	Tamil	
1948	Balaraju	Telugu	Seetha
1948	Bhojan	Tamil	
1948	Chakradhari	Tamil	
1948	Kaamavalli	Tamil	
1949	Navajeevanam	Tamil	
1950	Jeevitham	Telugu	Lakshmi
1950	Macha Rekai	Tamil	
1950	Swapna Sundari	Telugu	
1950	Vaali Sugreeva	Telugu	
1951	Saudamini	Tamil	Hemavathi
1951	Soudamini	Telugu	Hemavathi
1951	Vanasundari	Tamil	
1951	Mohana Sundaram	Tamil	Visalakshi
1952	Chinna Durai	Tamil	Indramani
1952	Velaikaran	Tamil	
1953	Kodarikam	Telugu	
1953	Mamiyar	Tamil	
1953	Shyamala	Tamil	Shyamala
1953	Tingu Ranga	Telugu	Shyamala
1953	Vayyari Bhama	Telugu	Sudha
1954	Ammaiyappan	Tamil	Poongavanam
1954	Edhir Paradhathu	Tamil	Nalini
1954	En Magal	Tamil	Vasantha
1954	Sati Sakkubai	Telugu	Sakkubai
1955	Nam Kuzhandai	Tamil	
1956	Mangala Gauri	Tamil	
1956	Naga Panchami	Telugu	
1956	Naga Panjami	Tamil	
1956	Sri Gauri Mahatyam	Telugu	
1956	Verum Pechu Alla	Tamil	
1957	Chakravarthi Thirumagal	Tamil	Dhurga
1957	Rajaputhri Rahasyamu	Telugu	Dhurga
1957	Sati Savitri	Telugu	Savithri
1957	Sathiyavan Savithri	Tamil	Savithri
1959	Sati Tulasi	Telugu	
1959	Raja Sevai	Tamil	Gowri
1959	Rechukka Pagatichukka	Telugu	Gowri
1959	Veerapandiya Kattabomman	Tamil	Queen Jakkamma
1959	Veerapandya Kattabrahmana	Telugu	Queen Jakkamma
1959	Sivagangai Seemai	Tamil	
1960	Abhimanam	Telugu	
1960	Deepavali	Telugu	Vasumathi
1960	Sri Venkateswara Mahatyam	Telugu	Mahalakshmi
1961	Krishna Prema	Telugu	
1961	Yodhana Yodhulu	Telugu	
1962	Mahamantri Timmarusu	Telugu	
1962	Vadivukku Valai Kappu	Tamil	Rajeswari
1963	Lava Kusha	Telugu	Bhoodevi
1963	Lava Kusha	Tamil	Bhoodevi
1963	Sri Krishnarjuna Yuddhamu	Telugu	Satyabhama
1964	Babruvahana	Telugu	Chitrangada
1964	Babruvahana	Tamil	Chitrangada
1964	Karuppu Panam	Tamil	Kamala
1964	Ullasa Payanam	Tamil	
1965	Raja Drohi	Telugu	
1965	Satya Harishchandra	Telugu	Chandramathi
1965	Veera Abhimanyu	Tamil	Subhadra
1965	Veerabhimanyu	Telugu	Subhadra
1965	Vijayasimha	Telugu	
1966	Sri Krishna Pandaveeyam	Telugu	Kunti
1966	Sri Krishna Tulabharam	Telugu	Shachi Devi
1967	Apoorva Piravaigal	Tamil	
1967	Bhama Vijayam	Telugu	Queen
1967	Kandan Karunai	Tamil	Indrani
1967	Sri Krishnavataram	Telugu	Draupadi
1967	Ummadi Kutumbam	Telugu	Kantham
1968	Nindu Samsaram	Telugu	Tulasamma
1968	Panama Pasama	Tamil	Meenakshi
1968	Uyira Maanama	Tamil	
1969	Aadarsa Kutumbam	Telugu	Jaya
1969	Aasthulu Anthasthulu	Telugu	
1969	Avare En Deivam	Tamil	
1969	Poova Thalaiya	Tamil	Paruvathamma
1969	Sattekalapu Satteya	Telugu	
1969	Thanga Surangam	Tamil	Kamakshi
1970	Bhayangkara Guḍhachari	Telugu	Kamakshi
1970	Kaaviya Thalaivi	Tamil	
1970	Drohi	Telugu	
1970	Maattukara Velan	Tamil	Annapurna
1970	Malathi	Tamil	Gowri
1971	Aathi Parasakthi	Tamil	Aathi Parasakthi
1971	Aathi Parasakthi	Telugu	Aathi Parasakthi
1971	Bhagyavanthudu	Telugu	
1971	Bomma Borusa	Telugu	Parvathamma
1971	Ilangeswaran	Tamil	
1971	Kannan Karunai	Tamil	
1971	Meendum Vazhven	Tamil	Shantha Lakshmi
1971	Prem Nagar	Telugu	
1971	Savaale Samali	Tamil	Alamelu
1971	Sri Krishna Satya	Telugu	
1971	Thirumagal	Tamil	Maragatham
1971	Veguli Penn	Tamil	Doctor S. V. Lakshmi
1972	Attanu Diddina Koḍalu	Telugu	
1972	Bullet Bullodu	Telugu	Shantha Lakshmi
1972	Bala Bharatam	Telugu	Gandhari
1972	Deiva Sankalpam	Tamil	
1972	Delhi To Madras	Tamil	
1972	Pillaiyo Pillai	Tamil	
1972	Sri Krishna Satya	Telugu	Draupadi
1972	Velli Vizha	Tamil	Sivakami
1973	Bangaru Babu	Telugu	
1973	Devudu Chesina Manushulu	Telugu	Varalakshmi
1973	Karaikkal Ammaiyar	Tamil	
1973	Meena	Telugu	Krishnaveni
1973	Nathayil Muthu	Tamil	
1973	Pedda Koduku	Telugu	
1973	Rajaraja Cholan	Tamil	Kundavai Pirāttiyār
1973	Srivaru Mavaru	Telugu	Lakshmi w/o Jagapathi
1973	Thirumalai Deivam	Tamil	
1974	Inti Kodalu	Telugu	
1974	Thaai	Tamil	Karpagam
1974	Devi Sri Karumari Amman	Tamil	Meenakshi
1975	Abhimanavathi	Telugu	
1975	Cinema Paithiyam	Tamil	
1975	Ee Kaalam Dampatulu	Telugu	
1975	Yashoda Krishna	Telugu	
1975	Ramuni Minchina Ramudu	Telugu	
1975	Uravu Solla Oruvan	Tamil	
1976	Dasavatharam	Tamil	Aathi Parasakthi
1976	Doralu Dongalu	Telugu	
1976	Raja Raja Choludu	Telugu	Kundavai Pirāttiyār
1976	Mamanchi Thalli	Telugu	Karpagam
1976	Needhikku Thalaivanangu	Tamil	Maragadham
1976	Pichimaraju	Telugu	
1976	Rojavin Raja	Tamil	
1976	Vayilla Poochi	Tamil	
1976	Vazhvu En Pakkam	Tamil	Vijayalakshmi
1977	Chanakya Chandragupta	Telugu	Muradevi
1977	Daana Veera Soora Karna	Telugu	Kunti
1977	Navarathinam	Tamil	
1977	Sri Krishna Leela	Tamil	Yasodha
1977	Svarganiki Nichenalu	Telugu	
1977	Unnai Suttrum Ulagam	Tamil	
1979	Kavari Maan	Tamil	
1979	Samajaniki Sawal	Telugu	
1979	Suvarilladha Chiththirangal	Tamil	Parvathy
1979	Viyyalavari Kayyalu	Telugu	
1980	Bangaru Bava	Telugu	
1980	Ketugadu	Telugu	
1980	Madanamanjari	Telugu	
1980	Mogudu Kavali	Telugu	
1980	Sarada Ramudu	Telugu	Suvrchala
1980	Sardar Papa Rayudu	Telugu	Urmila Devi
1981	47 Natkal	Tamil	
1981	47 Rojulu	Telugu	
1981	Aggi Ravva	Telugu	Meenakshi
1981	Guru Sishyulu	Telugu	Meenakshi
1981	Prema Simhasanam	Telugu	Anasuya Devi
1982	Dheviyin Thiruvilaiyadal	Tamil	
1982	Eeshwara Kataksam	Telugu	
1982	Kaliyuga Ramudu	Telugu	Jayamma & Suramma
1982	Vayyari Bhamalu Vagalamari Bhartalu	Telugu	Seetamma
1983	Adutha Varisu	Tamil	Rani Amma
1983	Muddula Mogudu	Telugu	Varam
1983	Neti Bharatam	Telugu	
1983	Sri Ranga Neethulu	Telugu	Raja Rajeswari Devi
1983	Thoongatha Kannindru Ondru	Tamil	
1984	Ingeyum Oru Gangai	Tamil	
1984	Tharaasu	Tamil	
1984	Thiruppam	Tamil	
1984	Bangaru Kapuram	Telugu	Mahalakshmi
1984	Punyam Koddi Purushudu	Telugu	Gayathri Devi
1984	Devanthakudu	Telugu	
1985	Bullet	Telugu	
1985	Ooriki Soggadu	Telugu	Manikyam
1985	Srivaru	Telugu	Santana Lakshmi
1986	Muddula Krishnayya	Telugu	Mangalagiri Ramanamma
1986	Sri Vemana Charithra	Telugu	
1986	Tatayya Kankanam	Telugu	
1987	Lawyer Suhasini	Telugu	
1988	Chuttalabbayi	Telugu	Kanakadurgamma
1989	Praja Theerpu	Telugu	
1991	Guna	Tamil	Manonmani
1995	Sankalpam	Telugu	Mathaji

== Discography ==
Year	Film	Language	Song	Co-singers	Music director
1937	Balayogini	Telugu	Karuna Nilaya Managa	Tilak	Moti Babu & Maruti Seetharamaiah
1939	Raithu Bidda	Telugu	Ravoyi Vanamali Birabira Ravoyi	Kommuri Padmavati, P. Suribabu, T. Suryakumari & V. V. Subbaraju	S. Rajeswara Rao
1939	Raithu Bidda	Telugu	Raithuke Otiyyavalenanna	P. Suri Babu, T. Suryakumari & Kosaraju	S. Rajeswara Rao
1940	Illalu	Telugu	Koyilokasari Vachi Koosi Poyane		S. Rajeswara Rao
1940	Illalu	Telugu	Neepai Mohamuno Krishna Nilupagalemoyi Krishna	P. Suri Babu	S. Rajeswara Rao
1942	Aaraichimani	Tamil		A. R. Sakunthala	Srinivasa Rao Shinde
1942	Aaraichimani	Tamil		S. Balachander	Srinivasa Rao Shinde
1942	Shanta Bala Nagamma	Telugu	Sukhadayi Sukhadayi	S. Rajeswara Rao	S. Rajeswara Rao
1945	Mayalokam	Telugu	Chelia Manakela Vaari Joli	Bezawada Rajaratnam	Galipenchala Narasimha Rao
1945	Mayalokam	Telugu	Manade Prapannchamanta		Galipenchala Narasimha Rao
1947	Palnati Yudham	Telugu	Chandamama O Chandamama		Galipenchala Narasimha Rao
1947	Palnati Yudham	Telugu	Oho Charusheela Oho Veerabala	Akkineni	Galipenchala Narasimha Rao
1947	Palnati Yudham	Telugu	Ee Kuhu Raatri		Galipenchala Narasimha Rao
1947	Palnati Yudham	Telugu	Vachunate Raju Naa Raju		Galipenchala Narasimha Rao
1947	Palnati Yudham	Telugu	Ranamulo Thodagotti	Akkineni	Galipenchala Narasimha Rao
1947	Aayiram Thalai Vaangi Apoorva Chinthamani	Tamil	Kaadhal Aaginen		G. Ramanathan
1947	Aayiram Thalai Vaangi Apoorva Chinthamani	Tamil	Kadhal Vanathilae Naam		G. Ramanathan
1947	Aayiram Thalai Vaangi Apoorva Chinthamani	Tamil	Maadhar Manonmaniye	P. S. Govindan	G. Ramanathan
1948	Balaraju	Telugu	Evarine Nenevarine Vagavagala Nenevarine		C. R. Subburaman, Galipenchala Narasimha Rao & Ghantasala
1948	Balaraju	Telugu	O Balaraja Jaalileda Balaraja		C. R. Subburaman, Galipenchala Narasimha Rao & Ghantasala
1948	Balaraju	Telugu	Roopama Neeyaraya Nijaroopamu Neeyaraya		C. R. Subburaman, Galipenchala Narasimha Rao & Ghantasala
1948	Balaraju	Telugu	O Balaraja Jali Leda		C. R. Subburaman, Galipenchala Narasimha Rao & Ghantasala
1948	Balaraju	Telugu	Chalura Vagalu	A. Nageswara Rao	C. R. Subburaman, Galipenchala Narasimha Rao & Ghantasala
1948	Balaraju	Telugu	Teli Chudumu Hai	Ghantasala	C. R. Subburaman, Galipenchala Narasimha Rao & Ghantasala
1948	Balaraju	Telugu	Raja Ra Na Raja		C. R. Subburaman, Galipenchala Narasimha Rao & Ghantasala
1948	Balaraju	Telugu	Neeku Nevaru Leru		C. R. Subburaman, Galipenchala Narasimha Rao & Ghantasala
1948	Balaraju	Telugu	Vere Leraya Paramesha		C. R. Subburaman, Galipenchala Narasimha Rao & Ghantasala
1948	Balaraju	Telugu	Varuna Varuna		C. R. Subburaman, Galipenchala Narasimha Rao & Ghantasala
1948	Bhojan	Tamil	Bhagyasali Puvimel Naane		C. R. Subburaman
1948	Bhojan	Tamil	Vandhaar Ilam Singam Pol		C. R. Subburaman
1948	Bhojan	Tamil	Varuvaar En Idhaya Raajan		C. R. Subburaman
1949	Navajeevanam	Tamil	Eedilla Kathalar Name	Ghantasala	S. V. Venkataraman
1949	Navajeevanam	Tamil	Jeeva Sugitha Anbe	Ghantasala	S. V. Venkataraman
1949	Navajeevanam	Tamil	Aananda Manoharaa		S. V. Venkataraman
1949	Navajeevanam	Tamil	Nalla Vaazhvu		S. V. Venkataraman
1949	Navajeevanam	Tamil	Sri Raamaa Raghugula Naayagaa		S. V. Venkataraman
1950	Jeevitham	Telugu	Aandha Nouka Palliseemaa		R. Sudarsanam
1950	Jeevitham	Telugu	Melukondi Tellavare Tellaga		R. Sudarsanam
1950	Jeevitham	Telugu	Aashlanni Gaalilona Kalasipoyene		R. Sudarsanam
1950	Jeevitham	Telugu	Choopavaa Naapati Tova Deva		R. Sudarsanam
1950	Macha Rekai	Tamil	Odathe Unnai Vida Matten	T. R. Mahalingam	C. R. Subburaman
1950	Macha Rekai	Tamil	Ellam Irunthenna... Aaadharavilaa	T. R. Mahalingam	C. R. Subburaman
1950	Macha Rekai	Tamil	Vaan Mevum Nilaave		C. R. Subburaman
1950	Macha Rekai	Tamil	Maname Mayaginen Mannavane		C. R. Subburaman
1950	Macha Rekai	Tamil	Kanavilum Maravene Naan	T. R. Mahalingam	C. R. Subburaman
1950	Vaali Sugreeva	Telugu	Endulakī Vedana		S. Rajeswara Rao, Pendyala Nageswara Rao, Master Venu, Galipenchala Narasimha Rao & Ghantasala
1950	Vaali Sugreeva	Telugu	Karunamaya Madhusudana		S. Rajeswara Rao, Pendyala Nageswara Rao, Master Venu, Galipenchala Narasimha Rao & Ghantasala
1950	Vaali Sugreeva	Telugu	Kalavilasame Preme Mana	Ghantasala	S. Rajeswara Rao, Pendyala Nageswara Rao, Master Venu, Galipenchala Narasimha Rao & Ghantasala
1950	Vaali Sugreeva	Telugu	Chiluca Valapuloluca Paduma		S. Rajeswara Rao, Pendyala Nageswara Rao, Master Venu, Galipenchala Narasimha Rao & Ghantasala
1950	Vaali Sugreeva	Telugu	Niganigalade Vayasu	S. Rajeswara Rao	S. Rajeswara Rao, Pendyala Nageswara Rao, Master Venu, Galipenchala Narasimha Rao & Ghantasala
1950	Vaali Sugreeva	Telugu	Ragame Vennelai Anuragame		S. Rajeswara Rao, Pendyala Nageswara Rao, Master Venu, Galipenchala Narasimha Rao & Ghantasala
1951	Mohana Sundaram	Tamil	Avar Thaane En		T. G. Linggappa
1951	Mohana Sundaram	Tamil	Oh Jegamathil Inbam Kanbathellam	T. R. Mahalingam	T. G. Linggappa
1951	Mohana Sundaram	Tamil	Pulli Maanai Pole	T. R. Mahalingam	T. G. Linggappa
1951	Mohana Sundaram	Tamil	Kanneer Thaano En	T. R. Mahalingam	T. G. Linggappa
1951	Mohana Sundaram	Tamil	Oh Jegamathil Inbam Kanbathellam		T. G. Linggappa
1951	Mohana Sundaram	Tamil	Venmugil Kaana		T. G. Linggappa
1951	Saudamini	Tamil	Koohoo Ena Maangkuyil Konjudhaasaiyaale		S. V. Venkatraman
1951	Saudamini	Tamil	Sollu Sollu Vivaramaayi		S. V. Venkatraman
1951	Soudamini	Telugu	Ko Ko Ani Kavvinche Koyilamma		S. V. Venkatraman
1951	Soudamini	Telugu	Cheppu Cheppu Thaggu Thaggu		S. V. Venkatraman
1951	Soudamini	Telugu	Daivame Pagayene Kalame		S. V. Venkatraman
1951	Soudamini	Telugu	Ninu Chere Dhaariledha		S. V. Venkatraman
1951	Vanasundari	Tamil	Azhagana Thaadi Raja		C. R. Subburaman
1951	Vanasundari	Tamil	Nane Rani		C. R. Subburaman
1952	Chinna Durai	Tamil	Aaaraadha Sogam		T. G. Lingappa
1952	Shyamala	Tamil	Pudhu Vaazhvu Kanden Naan Poovil		G. Ramanathan, T. V. Raju & S. B. Dinakar Rao
1952	Shyamala	Tamil	Thaaye Sangkari	Udutha Sarojini	G. Ramanathan, T. V. Raju & S. B. Dinakar Rao
1952	Shyamala	Tamil	Aha, Ahaa Naan Bhaagyasaali		G. Ramanathan, T. V. Raju & S. B. Dinakar Rao
1952	Shyamala	Tamil	Inbam Kanden Indre	M. K. Thyagaraja Bhagavathar	G. Ramanathan, T. V. Raju & S. B. Dinakar Rao
1952	Tingu Ranga	Telugu	Idi Yemi Maayoō Kada		T. V. Raju & S. B. Dinakar Rao
1952	Tingu Ranga	Telugu	Thalli Sangkari	Udutha Sarojini	T. V. Raju & S. B. Dinakar Rao
1952	Tingu Ranga	Telugu	Haayī Haayī Naa Santhosham		T. V. Raju & S. B. Dinakar Rao
1952	Tingu Ranga	Telugu	Leda Munipidi kanugonaleda	Ghantasala	T. V. Raju & S. B. Dinakar Rao
1952	Velaikaran	Tamil	Naane Raani En Maname		R. Sudarsanam
1952	Velaikaran	Tamil	Ezhil Vaan Mugam Thannaiye		R. Sudarsanam
1952	Velaikaran	Tamil	Kaadhalum Poi Aagume	T. R. Mahalingam	R. Sudarsanam
1953	Kodarikam	Telugu	Navmasamasam Mosi		C. N. Pandurangan
1953	Kodarikam	Telugu	Tīrenuga Cheluvaarenuga	Ghantasala	C. N. Pandurangan
1953	Kodarikam	Telugu	Devi Eeswari Mampahi		C. N. Pandurangan
1953	Kodarikam	Telugu	Ninuchoose Bhagya Mennatikaina		C. N. Pandurangan
1953	Kodarikam	Telugu	Uyyalalugaoi Papayi		C. N. Pandurangan
1953	Mamiyar	Tamil	Arul Purivaaye Jaganmaathaa		C. N. Pandurangan
1953	Mamiyar	Tamil	Vazviniley Nannalithuve	A. M. Rajah	C. N. Pandurangan
1953	Mamiyar	Tamil	Devi Eeswari Jagathamba		C. N. Pandurangan
1953	Mamiyar	Tamil	Singara Roopa Karunaa		C. N. Pandurangan
1953	Mamiyar	Tamil	Aiyirandu Thingalaayi		C. N. Pandurangan
1953	Vayyari Bhama	Telugu	Elane Elane Neditu		S. Rajeswara Rao
1953	Vayyari Bhama	Telugu	Vikasinnchene Jaaji Virulanni		S. Rajeswara Rao
1954	Ammaiyappan	Tamil	Kaadhal Puraa Kaadhile		T. R. Pappa
1954	Ammaiyappan	Tamil	Sidhaindhadhe.... Manamogana Jeevan	M. L. Vasanthakumari	T. R. Pappa
1954	En Magal	Tamil	Engal Vaazhvum Engal		C. N. Pandurangan
1954	En Magal	Tamil	Pennaaga Pirandhorku		C. N. Pandurangan
1954	En Magal	Tamil	Konden Arum Perum	T. M. Soundararajan	C. N. Pandurangan
1954	En Magal	Tamil	Ulaginil Vaazhvu Tharum Kalvi	T. Sathyavathi	C. N. Pandurangan
1954	En Magal	Tamil	Vaazhvinile Aanandam		C. N. Pandurangan
1954	Sati Sakkubai	Telugu			Ogirala Ramachandra Rao
1955	Sri Krishna Tulabharamu	Telugu	Ika Ne Gichina Geethu		H. R. Padmanabha Shastri & Babu Rao
1955	Sri Krishna Tulabharamu	Telugu	Ee Lolaakshulu Nee Priyottamanu		H. R. Padmanabha Shastri & Babu Rao
1955	Sri Krishna Tulabharamu	Telugu	Enta Mosa Mahaa Naadhaa		H. R. Padmanabha Shastri & Babu Rao
1955	Sri Krishna Tulabharamu	Telugu	Krishna Mukunda Murare	P. Suri Babu & Jikki	H. R. Padmanabha Shastri & Babu Rao
1955	Sri Krishna Tulabharamu	Telugu	Dhanadhaan Yaadikamulu Gani		H. R. Padmanabha Shastri & Babu Rao
1955	Sri Krishna Tulabharamu	Telugu	Nandagopaalude Thanavaadaithe		H. R. Padmanabha Shastri & Babu Rao
1955	Sri Krishna Tulabharamu	Telugu	Nadhude Jagannadhu	Jikki	H. R. Padmanabha Shastri & Babu Rao
1955	Sri Krishna Tulabharamu	Telugu	Nee Mahatyam Okintayun		H. R. Padmanabha Shastri & Babu Rao
1955	Sri Krishna Tulabharamu	Telugu	Bale Manci Chaukaberamu	P. Suri Babu	H. R. Padmanabha Shastri & Babu Rao
1955	Sri Krishna Tulabharamu	Telugu	Mirjalagalada Nayanathi		H. R. Padmanabha Shastri & Babu Rao
1955	Sri Krishna Tulabharamu	Telugu	Vratamulonarcu Kaalamuna		H. R. Padmanabha Shastri & Babu Rao
1955	Nam Kuzhandai	Tamil	Ulagam Pora Thinusai		M. D. Parthasarathy
1955	Nam Kuzhandai	Tamil	Kadhaiyaa Alladhu Karpanaiyaa		M. D. Parthasarathy
1955	Nam Kuzhandai	Tamil	O! Mariyaadhai Ariyaadha Podhu	Kothamangalam Seenu	M. D. Parthasarathy
1955	Nam Kuzhandai	Tamil	Idhayathile Pugundha		M. D. Parthasarathy
1956	Kanakatara	Telugu	Ennaallu Ennaallu Vishadagaadha		Ghantasala
1956	Kanakatara	Telugu	Emayinaaro Paapalendunnaaro		Ghantasala
1956	Kanakatara	Telugu	Bhagyavati Nene Saubhagyavati Nene		Ghantasala
1956	Kanakatara	Telugu	Ento Allaarumuddugaa		Ghantasala
1956	Kanakatara	Telugu	Bhartapraanammule Baligonna		Ghantasala
1956	Naga Panjami	Tamil	Om Namasivaaya		
1956	Naga Panjami	Tamil	Sambo Maha Devaa	V. Nagayya	
1957	Chakravarthi Thirumagal	Tamil	Ematramthaana En Vazhvile		G. Ramanathan
1957	Chakravarthi Thirumagal	Tamil	Nalangittu Parpomadi	A. P. Komala	G. Ramanathan
1957	Chakravarthi Thirumagal	Tamil	Sollaley Vilakka Theriyale	P. Leela	G. Ramanathan
1957	Rajaputhri Rahasyamu	Telugu	Yemaye Raja Nee Premaye		G. Ramanathan
1957	Rajaputhri Rahasyamu	Telugu	Thalayanti Podhamate	A. P. Komala	G. Ramanathan
1957	Rajaputhri Rahasyamu	Telugu	Tholisare Manasu Kalisene	P. Leela	G. Ramanathan
1957	Sati Savitri	Telugu	Enduko Ohoho Vilasala	P. B. Sreenivas	M. Balamuralikrishna, Mallik, Master Venu, P. Suribabu, Baburao, J. Lakshminarayana, H. R. Padmanabha Sastry & S. Rajeswara Rao
1957	Sati Savitri	Telugu	Raavelano	P. B. Sreenivas	M. Balamuralikrishna, Mallik, Master Venu, P. Suribabu, Baburao, J. Lakshminarayana, H. R. Padmanabha Sastry & S. Rajeswara Rao
1957	Sati Savitri	Telugu	Nammithine Janani	P. Sreenivasan & Udutha Sarojini	M. Balamuralikrishna, Mallik, Master Venu, P. Suribabu, Baburao, J. Lakshminarayana, H. R. Padmanabha Sastry & S. Rajeswara Rao
1957	Sati Savitri	Telugu	Amma.... Kaavave Amma		M. Balamuralikrishna, Mallik, Master Venu, P. Suribabu, Baburao, J. Lakshminarayana, H. R. Padmanabha Sastry & S. Rajeswara Rao
1957	Sati Savitri	Telugu	Maataa Idena		M. Balamuralikrishna, Mallik, Master Venu, P. Suribabu, Baburao, J. Lakshminarayana, H. R. Padmanabha Sastry & S. Rajeswara Rao
1957	Sati Savitri	Telugu	Navaratnanchita		M. Balamuralikrishna, Mallik, Master Venu, P. Suribabu, Baburao, J. Lakshminarayana, H. R. Padmanabha Sastry & S. Rajeswara Rao
1957	Sati Savitri	Telugu	Pati Bhakti		M. Balamuralikrishna, Mallik, Master Venu, P. Suribabu, Baburao, J. Lakshminarayana, H. R. Padmanabha Sastry & S. Rajeswara Rao
1957	Sati Savitri	Telugu	Praananaatha		M. Balamuralikrishna, Mallik, Master Venu, P. Suribabu, Baburao, J. Lakshminarayana, H. R. Padmanabha Sastry & S. Rajeswara Rao
1957	Sati Savitri	Telugu	Thaguna Idi Janaka		M. Balamuralikrishna, Mallik, Master Venu, P. Suribabu, Baburao, J. Lakshminarayana, H. R. Padmanabha Sastry & S. Rajeswara Rao
1957	Sathiyavan Savithri	Tamil	Edhuko Indraanandham	P. B. Sreenivas	S. V. Venkatraman
1957	Sathiyavan Savithri	Tamil	Raavelano	P. B. Sreenivas	S. V. Venkatraman
1957	Sathiyavan Savithri	Tamil	Ambigaiye Kadhi Nee Endhan	P. Sreenivasan & Udutha Sarojini	S. V. Venkatraman
1957	Sathiyavan Savithri	Tamil	Ammaa.... Katharulvaai Ammaa		S. V. Venkatraman
1957	Sathiyavan Savithri	Tamil	Anbarin Innuyir Vandhida		S. V. Venkatraman
1957	Sathiyavan Savithri	Tamil	Navaratnanchita		S. V. Venkatraman
1957	Sathiyavan Savithri	Tamil	Pati Bhakti		S. V. Venkatraman
1957	Sathiyavan Savithri	Tamil	Naan Vaanagum		S. V. Venkatraman
1957	Sathiyavan Savithri	Tamil	Thaguna Idi Janaka		S. V. Venkatraman
1959	Sathi Thulasi	Telugu	Arthinchi Parulu Ninnadugavaccheranuchu (Padyam)		Pamarthi
1959	Sathi Thulasi	Telugu	Alagha Prabhava Chakra		Pamarthi
1959	Sathi Thulasi	Telugu	Yevaro Thanevaro Yevaro		Pamarthi
1959	Sathi Thulasi	Telugu	O Matha Nammithi Nee Padhame		Pamarthi
1959	Sathi Thulasi	Telugu	Jaya Mangala Gowri		Pamarthi
1959	Sathi Thulasi	Telugu	Tholi Janmambuna Nochinatti		Pamarthi
1959	Sathi Thulasi	Telugu	Dhasiga Sevincha Thaganaa		Pamarthi
1959	Veera Bhaskarudu	Telugu	Elage Sukhala Charinchemu Bala	P. B. Sreenivas	S. Hanumantha Rao
1959	Veera Bhaskarudu	Telugu	Karunaaleni Rajaneethi		S. Hanumantha Rao
1959	Veera Bhaskarudu	Telugu	Chelee Valape Kale Avuna		S. Hanumantha Rao
1959	Veera Bhaskarudu	Telugu	Manasara Kalyani Palikinchu Veena	P. Leela	S. Hanumantha Rao
1959	Veera Bhaskarudu	Telugu	Dhaari Kaanaradhaye	P. Leela	S. Hanumantha Rao
1959	Veerapandiya Kattabomman	Tamil	Singara Kanne Un		G. Ramanathan
1959	Veerapandiya Kattabomman	Tamil	Vetrri Vadivelane.... Manam Kanintharul	V. N. Sundaram	G. Ramanathan
1959	Veerapandiya Kattabomman	Tamil	Takku Takku Ena Adikkadi	P. Susheela & A. P. Komala	G. Ramanathan
1959	Veerapandya Kattabrahmana	Telugu	Chinnari Thalli		G. Ramanathan
1959	Veerapandya Kattabrahmana	Telugu	Vijaya Varadayaka.... Prabho Krupakara	B. Gopalam	G. Ramanathan
1959	Veerapandya Kattabrahmana	Telugu	Takku Takku Bada Bada	S. Janaki & A. P. Komala	G. Ramanathan
1959	Sivagangai Seemai	Tamil	Thanimai Nerndhadho		Viswanathan–Ramamoorthy
1959	Sivagangai Seemai	Tamil	Muthu Pugazh Padaittha	Radha Jayalakshmi	Viswanathan–Ramamoorthy
1959	Sivagangai Seemai	Tamil	Thendral Vanthu Veesatho	T. S. Bhagavathi	Viswanathan–Ramamoorthy
1960	Abhimanam	Telugu	Rama Idhi Yemi		Ghantasala
1960	Deepavali	Telugu	Mahadeva Deva Mahaneeya		Ghantasala
1960	Deepavali	Telugu	Agni Sakshiga		Ghantasala
1960	Deepavali	Telugu	Haye Haye Andala Raja		Ghantasala
1960	Sri Venkateswara Mahatyam	Telugu	Sri Devini Needu Deverini		Pendyala Nageswara Rao
1960	Sri Venkateswara Mahatyam	Telugu	Varala Beramaya Vanaram Beramaya		Pendyala Nageswara Rao
1960	Sri Venkateswara Mahatyam	Telugu	Ee Niradharana Barinchalenu		Pendyala Nageswara Rao
1961	Krishna Prema	Telugu	Repe Vasthadanta Gopaludu	Ghantasala	Pendyala Nageswara Rao
1961	Krishna Prema	Telugu	Cheliyalu Muddaraalu		Pendyala Nageswara Rao
1961	Krishna Prema	Telugu	Krishnaa Radhamano Vihari		Pendyala Nageswara Rao
1961	Krishna Prema	Telugu	Navaneetha Chorudu Nandha Kishorudu	Jikki	Pendyala Nageswara Rao
1961	Krishna Prema	Telugu	Navaneetha Chorudu Nandha Kishorudu (pathos)	Jikki	Pendyala Nageswara Rao
1962	Mahamantri Timmarusu	Telugu	Leela Krishna Nee Leelalu		Pendyala Nageswara Rao
1962	Mahamantri Timmarusu	Telugu	Tirumala Tirupati Venkateswara	P. Susheela	Pendyala Nageswara Rao
1962	Vadivukku Valai Kappu	Tamil	Thaamadham Seiyathe Thozhi		K. V. Mahadevan
1963	Lava Kusa	Telugu	Rajata Rajadharmamata		Ghantasala
1963	Sri Krishnarjuna Yuddhamu	Telugu	Veyi Shubhamulu Kalugu Neeku		Pendyala Nageswara Rao
1963	Sri Krishnarjuna Yuddham	Tamil	Vaazhvil Subangalum		Pendyala Nageswara Rao
1964	Babruvahana	Telugu	Maa Saati Vaaru		Pamarthi
1964	Babruvahana	Telugu	Yemani Thaanaaduno		Pamarthi
1964	Babruvahana	Telugu	Nee Sari Manohari	Ghantasala	Pamarthi
1964	Babruvahana	Telugu	Vardillu Papa		Pamarthi
1964	Babruvahana	Tamil			Pamarthi
1965	Raja Drohi	Telugu	Kamitham Theerenu Nede Cheliya		K. V. Mahadevan & Y. N. Sharma
1965	Satya Harishchandra	Telugu	He Chandrachooda Madanantaka Shoolapane	Ghantasala	Pendyala Nageswara Rao
1965	Satya Harishchandra	Telugu	Andhala Tanaya Aananda Nilaya		Pendyala Nageswara Rao
1965	Satya Harishchandra	Telugu	Andhala Tanaya Aananda Nilaya (pathos)		Pendyala Nageswara Rao
1965	Satya Harishchandra	Telugu	Srimanmaha Divyatejo Virajee		Pendyala Nageswara Rao
1965	Satya Harishchandra	Telugu	Satyamunakendhu Bhangamu Jaruguvela		Pendyala Nageswara Rao
1965	Satya Harishchandra	Telugu	Namo Bhuthanadha Namo Deva Deva	Ghantasala	Pendyala Nageswara Rao
1965	Satya Harishchandra	Telugu	Lokabandava Sarvalokaika Vandya		Pendyala Nageswara Rao
1966	Sri Krishna Tulabharam	Telugu	Vidhudu Nee Maata		Pendyala Nageswara Rao
1967	Kandan Karunai	Tamil	Velli Malai Mannava		K. V. Mahadevan
1967	Sri Krishnavataram	Telugu	Krishna Govinda Dwarakavaasa		T. V. Raju
1967	Sri Krishnavataram	Telugu	Ee Seerojamul Chepatti		T. V. Raju
1969	Thanga Surangam	Tamil	Petramanam Sirayile		T. K. Ramamoorthy
1970	Bhayangkara Gudhachari	Telugu			T. K. Ramamoorthy
1970	Kaaviya Thalaivi	Tamil	Kavidhaiyil Ezhudhiya Eduthnatharadi	P. Susheela	K. V. Mahadevan
1971	Ilangeswaran	Tamil	Jothimayamana		S. M. Subbaiah Naidu
1971	Kannan Karunai	Tamil			S. V. Venkatraman
1973	Karaikkal Ammaiyar	Tamil	Anbe Sivam Endru Paaduvome		Kunnakkudi Vaidyanathan
1973	Pedda Koduku	Telugu	Thama Gonthu Nulime Varike		P. Adinarayana Rao
1973	Rajaraja Cholan	Tamil	Eduthandhanadi Thillayile	Seerkazhi Govindarajan	Kunnakkudi Vaidyanathan
1973	Rajaraja Cholan	Tamil	Thanjai Periya Koyil Pallandu Vaazhgave	Seerkazhi Govindarajan & T. R. Mahalingam	Kunnakkudi Vaidyanathan
1973	Thirumalai Deivam	Tamil	Neela Nira Megamellaam Neeye Kanna		Kunnakkudi Vaidyanathan
1973	Valli Deivanai	Tamil	Velava Thiru Amarar Kula		N. S. Thyagarajan
1974	Devi Sri Karumari Amman	Tamil	Kanne Kanmaniye Karumaari		Shankar–Ganesh
1974	Thaai	Tamil	Mangalam Kaappaal Sivasakthi		M. S. Viswanathan
1976	Mamanchi Thalli	Telugu			M. S. Viswanathan
1976	Needhikku Thalaivanangu	Tamil	Intha Pachai Killikoru		M. S. Viswanathan
1977	Sri Krishna Leela	Tamil	Nalla Naal		K. V. Mahadevan
1978	Anantha Bairavi	Tamil	Umaiyavale Mariamma		R. Ramanujam
1979	Kavari Maan	Tamil	Sollavallaayo Kiliye		Ilaiyaraaja
1986	Muddula Krishnayya	Telugu	Mangalagirinelu Maharani	V. Ramakrishna	K. V. Mahadevan
1991	Guna	Tamil	Unnai Naan Ariven		Ilaiyaraja
