= Tollywood films of 1960 =

Tollywood films of 1960 may refer to:

- Bengali films of the 1960
- Telugu films of 1960
