= Kula Deivam =

Kula Deivam (or Kuladeivam) may refer to:

- Kuladevata, an ancestral Hindu tutelary deity among a clan
- Kula Deivam (1956 film), a 1956 Indian Tamil-language film
- Kula Daivam, a 1960 Indian Telugu-language film
- Kula Deivam (TV series), an Indian TV series
- Kuladeivam Rajagopal, an Indian actor
