= Shyamala (film) =

- Poster
- Directed by: B. A. Subba Rao
- Written by: (Dialogues) Udayakumar
- Screenplay by: B. A. Subba Rao
- Story by: Tapi Dharma Rao Naidu
- Produced by: P. S. Seshachalam
- Starring: M. K. Thyagaraja Bhagavathar; S. Varalakshmi; Relangi
- Cinematography: C. Nageswara Rao; V. Rajagopal
- Edited by: V. S. Narayanan
- Music by: G. Ramanathan; T. V. Rajee; S. B. Dinakar Rao
- Production company: Yuva Pictures
- Release date: 29 November 1952
- Running time: 177 minutes
- Country: India
- Language: Tamil

Shyamala is a 1952 Indian Tamil-language film directed by B. A. Subba Rao. The film stars M. K. Thyagaraja Bhagavathar and S. Varalakshmi. It was released on 29 November 1952.

== Cast ==
The cast adapted from the database of Film News Anandan and from the film credits.

Male

- M. K. Thyagaraja Bhagavathar
- Relangi
- Stunt Somu
- Nandaram
- Vallinayagam
- M. A. Ganapathi Bhat
- K. Ramamoorthi
- B. Seetharam
- P. Suribabu

Female

- S. Varalakshmi
- T. Thilakam
- T. Kanakam
- S. Ashalatha
- C. N. Padma
- P. S. Lakshmi
- Kantha S. Lal
- A. Veenavathi
- Baby Saraswathi

== Production ==
The film was simultaneously produced in Telugu with the title Tingu Ranga.

== Soundtrack ==
Music was composed by G. Ramanathan, T. V. Raju and S. B. Dinakar Rao.

Song	Singer/s	Lyricist	Length
"Thaaye Sankari"	Udutha Sarojini & S. Varalakshmi	C. S. Natarajasundaram; Music: G. Ramanathan	03:29
"Kavi Ezhuthaanikku"	M. K. Thyagaraja Bhagavathar		03:07
"Anandamaana Naadham"	M. K. Thyagaraja Bhagavathar		02:59
"Rajan, Maharajan, Thiruvettiyur"	M. K. Thyagaraja Bhagavathar		05:52
"Shyamala, Shyamala En Jeevapriye"	M. K. Thyagaraja Bhagavathar		03:06
"Aaranange Nijam Nee Ariyaai"	M. K. Thyagaraja Bhagavathar	Kambadasan	03:22
"Kannukkor Virundhaagi"	M. K. Thyagaraja Bhagavathar		
"Amba, Aadhi Sakthi Jegadhamba"	M. L. Vasanthakumari		06:56
"Inbam Kanden Indre"	M. K. Thyagaraja Bhagavathar & S. Varalakshmi	Kambadasan	
"Pudhu Vaazhvu Kanden Naan Poovil"	S. Varalakshmi		
"Aha, Ahaa Naan Bhaagyasaali"	S. Varalakshmi		
"Indha Kaala Krishnanena"	Thiruchi Loganathan & Jikki	Kambadasan	03:17
"Undaddaa Moodaa Anndavan"	P. Suri Babu		02:30
"Takku Takku Tikku Tikku"			02:48
"Thaam Thithaam"	Relangi		01:24
"Raamaa Eno Inge"	Relangi		03:35

== Reception ==
The film did not fare well at the box office.
