= Palagummi =

Palagummi (Telugu: పాలగుమ్మి) is a Telugu surname

- Palagummi Padmaraju, Indian writer
- Palagummi Sainath, Indian development journalist
