= Nam Kuzhandai =

- Directed by: K. S. Gopalakrishnan (Note: Not K. S. Gopalakrishnan.)
- Written by: Thanjai N. Ramaiah Dass
- Produced by: W. M. S. Thambu
- Starring: R. S. Manohar; S. Varalakshmi; N. S. Krishnan; T. A. Mathuram; A. P. Nagarajan
- Cinematography: P. D. Mathur
- Edited by: V. B. Nataraja Mudaliar
- Music by: M. D. Parthasarathy
- Production company: Windsor Productions
- Release date: 27 May 1955
- Country: India
- Language: Tamil

Nam Kuzhandai (transl. Our Child) is a 1955 Indian Tamil-language film directed by K. S. Gopalakrishnan. The film stars R. S. Manohar and S. Varalakshmi.

== Cast ==
List adapted from the database of Film News Anandan

Male cast

- R. S. Manohar
- N. S. Krishnan
- V. Nagayya
- A. P. Nagarajan
- V. M. Ezhumalai

Female cast

- S. Varalakshmi
- T. A. Mathuram
- Kumari Lakshmi
- Lakshmiprabha

== Production ==
The film was produced by W. M. S. Thambu and directed by K. S. Gopalakrishnan. P. D. Mathur was in-charge of cinematography while V. B. Nataraja Mudaliar did the editing. Still photography was by R. N. Nagaraja Rao.

== Soundtrack ==
Music was composed by M. D. Parthasarathy .

| Song | Singer | Lyricist |
|---|---|---|
| "Deivame Unnai" | V. Nagayya | Thanjai N. Ramaiah Dass |
| "Ulagam Pora Thinusai" | S. Varalakshmi | Thanjai N. Ramaiah Dass |
| "Kadhaiyaa Alladhu Karpanaiyaa" | S. Varalakshmi | Thanjai N. Ramaiah Dass |
| "Deivathaal Agaadhenin" | V. N. Sundaram | Thanjai N. Ramaiah Dass |
| "Jigu Jigu Digiri Nambaadhe" | U. R. Jeevarathnam | Thanjai N. Ramaiah Dass |
| "Photo Edupadhu Edhukku" | N. S. Krishnan & C. S. Pandian | Thanjai N. Ramaiah Dass |
| "O! Mariyaadhai Ariyaadha Podhu"; A. "Paar Pogudhu Endha Maanida Veda"; B. "Meyadha Maan, Pul Meyadha Maan"; C. "Muruga Varam Arul" | S. Varalakshmi & Kothamangalam Seenu | Thanjai N. Ramaiah Dass |
| "Paalaivanameedhile Jeevanadhi Polave" | N. L. Ganasaraswathi | Thanjai N. Ramaiah Dass |
| "Oviya Kalai Therinthaal Pothuma" | M. S. Anuradha | Thanjai N. Ramaiah Dass |
| "Aandavan Sattathai" | Ghantasala | Thanjai N. Ramaiah Dass |
| "Idhayathile Pugundha" | S. Varalakshmi | Puratchidasan |
