= Devulapalli Krishnasastri =

Telugu poet, playwright and translator

- Born: Devulapalli Venkata Krishnasastri; 1 November 1897; Ramachandrapalem, Madras Presidency, British India
- Died: 24 February 1980 (aged 82); Madras, Tamil Nadu, India
- Writing career
- Genres: Playwright, poet
- Notable work: Krishna Paksham

Devulapalli Krishnasastri (1 November 1897 – 24 February 1980) was a Telugu poet, playwright and translator known for his works in Telugu literature and Telugu cinema. He is known as Andhra Shelley. In 1976, Krishnasastri was honoured with Padma Bhushan, third highest civilian award in India. In 1978, he received Sahitya Akademi Award for his literary works.

== Early life ==
Krishnasastri was born on 1 November 1897 in Ramachandrampalem of East Godavari, India. He was brought up in Pithapuram in a family of court-poets. He developed an interest in English literature while he was in high school.

== Career ==
Krishnasastri started writing poetry from a very young age. Krishnasastri's works changed significantly after he met Rabindranath Tagore at Santiniketan in 1929. Krishnasastri joined All India Radio in 1945 and wrote a number of plays for it.

He also translated Goda Devi's Tamil Tiruppavai into Telugu Keertanaas. Other translations of Tiruppavai are available - but they are all word for word. His translation is unique because he had taken the central idea of each Pasuram, made it into Pallavi and wove around it the rest of the paasuram into anupallavi and charanam(s). They were set to pure carnatic music, even as they were composed, by Amruthavalli Sundaram. The publication with notation, is Orient Longman.

He died on 24 February 1980.

== Literary works ==
Some of Krishnasastri's famous works include:

- Amrutha Veena (1992)
- Appude Putti Vunte
- Aruna Ratham
- Badarika
- Bahukaala Darshanam
- Dhanurdasu
- Gorinta
- Mangala Kahali
- Sri Vidyapathi
- Krishnapaksham - Urvashi pravasam
- Sharmishta
- Vyaasavali - Kavi parampara
- Sri Andallu Tiruppavu Kirtanalu (1993)
- Meghamala (1996)
- Krishna Paksham (The Darkening Fortnight),
- Pravasam (Alien Residence),
- Mahati (The Veena of Narada),
- Urvasi.

== Films ==
Krishnasastri entered the film industry by scripting the 1951 Telugu film Malliswari. He gave lyrics to about 160 songs in over 70 films during the 1950s to 1970s. They include Malleswari, Naa Illu, En Veedu, Bangaru Papa, Ekaveera, Bhagya Rekha (1957), Rakta Kanneeru, Bhakta Tukaram, Karthika Deepam, Gorintaku, Megha Sandesam, Sri Rama Pattabhishekam.

Year	Film	Song
1951	Malliswari	Aakaasa Veedhilo Hayiga Egirevu Desa Desalanni Tirigi Chusevu
1953	Naa Illu	Adigadigo Gagana Seema Andamaina Chandamama Adigo
1954	Bangaru Papa	Yavvana Madhuvanilo
1957	Bhagya Rekha	Neevundeda Kondapai Naasaami
1959	Raja Makutam	Sadiseyako Gali Sadiseya Boke
1965	Bangaru Panjaram	Pagalaite Doravera Raatiri Naa Raajuvula
1967	Sukhadukhalu	Idi Mallela Velayani Idi Vennela Masamani
1968	Undamma Bottu Pedata	Ravamma Mahalakhsmi Ravamma
1969	Ekaveera	Prati Raatri Vasantha Raatri
1970	Mayani Mamatha	Raanika Neekosam Sakhi, Raadika Vasanta Maasam
1971	Kalyana Mandapam	Chukkalu Pade Subha Mantram
1971	Antha Mana Manchike	Maata Chalada Manasu Chalada
1972	Manchi Rojulochayi	Neloto Needa Annadi Nanu Taakaradani
1973	Bhakta Tukaram	Ghana Ghana Sundaraa Karuna Rasa Mandiraa
1973	Neramu Siksha	Chesina Papam Needi Chitikina Bratukinkokaridi
1974	Amma Manasu	Srisailabhavanaa Meluko
1975	Balipeetam	Kusalama Neeku Kusalamena
1975	Cheekati Velugulu	Cheekati Velugula Kaugitilo Chinde Kumkuma Vannelu
1976	Sri Rajeswari Vilas Coffee Club	Naa Peru Bikari, Naa Daari Edari
1978	Seetamalakshmi	Maavi Chigugu Tinagane Koyila Palikena
1978	Sri Rama Pattabhishekam	Ee Gangakenta Digulu Ee Gaalikenta Gubulu
1979	Gorintaku	Gorinta Poochindi Komma Lekunda
1979	Karthika Deepam	Aaraneekuma Ee Deepam Karteeka Deepam
1980	Sri Vasavi Kanyaka Parameswari Mahatyam	Veena Naa Veena Eruguduva Neevainaa
1983	Megha Sandesam	Aakulo Aakunai Puvvulo Puvvunai Mundu Telusuna Prabhu
1986	Rakshasudu	Jaya Jaya

== Awards ==
Nandi Awards

- Best Lyricist - Seetamalakshmi (1978)
- Best Lyricist - Meghasandesam (1982)

Other Awards

- Andhra University has conferred the title Kala Prapoorna (The complete artist) on him in 1975.
- He was awarded the Sahitya Akademi Award.
- Krishnashastri also won the Padma Bhushan Award in the year 1976.
