= Thanga Surangam =

- Theatrical release poster
- Directed by: T. R. Ramanna
- Screenplay by: Sakthi T. K. Krishnasamy
- Story by: G. Balasubramaniyam
- Produced by: E. V. Rajan
- Starring: Sivaji Ganesan; Bharathi; Vennira Aadai Nirmala
- Cinematography: G. Durai-Amirtham
- Edited by: M. S. Mani
- Music by: T. K. Ramamoorthy
- Production company: E. V. R. Pictures
- Release date: 28 March 1969
- Country: India
- Language: Tamil

Thanga Surangam (transl. Gold Mine) is a 1969 Indian Tamil-language film, directed by T. R. Ramanna and produced by E. V. Rajan. The film stars Sivaji Ganesan, Bharathi, Vennira Aadai Nirmala and Nagesh. It was released on 28 March 1969 and emerged a major success. The film was remade in Hindi in 1978 as Furs Aur Koon and in Telugu in 1994 as Bayankara Gudachari.

== Plot ==
While escaping Burma during WWII, Kamakshi gives her son Rajan to a priest Arockiyasamy to get him to safety. They reunite years later in India when Rajan is a Central Bureau of Investigation officer out to catch a gang that's making counterfeit gold. Scientist Subbaiya was attempting to manufacture actual gold but accidentally created a highly realistic counterfeit. The leader of the gang, Mr. Spy has amassed great wealth with this counterfeit and is holding Subbaiya hostage to create more. Rajan tries to learn more by interrogating Amutha, Subbaiya's daughter. Mr. Spy, aware of Rajan's attempts, sends several spies to get closer to him and derail his investigation. As Rajan grows closer to catching the gang, he learns shocking truths that his father is Kanagasabai alais Mr. Spy. He arrests Mr. Spy and is given a gold medal.

== Cast ==
- Sivaji Ganesan as Rajan
- Bharathi as Amutha
- Vennira Aadai Nirmala as Malliga/Laila
- O. A. K. Thevar as Mr. Spy/Kanagasabai
- S. Varalakshmi as Kamakshi
- Major Sundarrajan as I.G Sundaresh
- Javar Seetharaman as Arockiyasamy
- T. S. Muthaiah as Subbaiya
- R. S. Manohar as Velayutham
- Nagesh as Mani
- Harikrishnan as Dr. Natesan
- B. V. Radha as Saroja
- Karuppu Subbiah as Dancer
- Gemini Balu as Spy Gang

== Production ==
Some scenes were shot at the Madras Race Course.

== Soundtrack ==
The music was composed by T. K. Ramamoorthy with lyrics by Kannadasan.

| Song | Singer | Length |
|---|---|---|
| "Naan Pirantha Nattu" | T. M. Soundararajan, V. V. Rajaram | 04:05 |
| "Sakthi Thannadu" | T. M. Soundararajan, L. R. Eswari | 04:08 |
| "Kattazagu Pappa" | T. M. Soundararajan | 03:15 |
| "Sandhana Kudathu Kulle" | T. M. Soundararajan, P. Susheela | 03:50 |
| "Petra Manam Sirayiley" | S. Varalakshmi | 03:26 |
| "Nadhiyae Madhuvanal" | L. R. Eswari | 03:05 |
