= Bhagya Rekha =

- Theatrical release poster
- Directed by: B. N. Reddy
- Screenplay by: B. N. Reddy; Palagummi Padmaraju
- Story by: Palagummi Padmaraju
- Produced by: Ponnaluri Brothers
- Starring: N. T. Rama Rao; Jamuna
- Cinematography: B. N. Konda Reddy
- Edited by: Vasu
- Music by: Pendyala Nageshwara Rao
- Production company: Ponnaluri Brothers Pvt Ltd
- Release date: 20 February 1957
- Running time: 146 mins
- Country: India
- Language: Telugu

Bhagya Rekha (transl. Fortunes) is a 1957 Indian Telugu-language drama film, produced by Ponnaluri Brothers under the Ponnaluri Brothers Pvt. Ltd. banner and directed by B. N. Reddy. It stars N. T. Rama Rao, and Jamuna, with music composed by Pendyala Nageswara Rao. The film was dubbed into Tamil as Veettukku Vandha Varalakshmi (1958).

== Plot ==
The film begins with Lakshmi, a kind-hearted orphan girl who is raised by her paternal uncle, Narayana Rao. However, her cruel aunt, Jagadamba, constantly mistreats her. Narayana Rao and Jagadamba have two children: Kotaiah, who dotes on Lakshmi, and Kathyayani, a spoiled, mischievous girl. Based on Lakshmi's horoscope, Narayana Rao predicts that she will secure a highly prosperous marriage. Following a family dispute, Kotaiah leaves home to join the army.

== Cast ==
- N. T. Rama Rao as Ravi
- Jamuna as Lakshmi
- Relangi as Pullaiah
- Ramana Reddy as Sambaiah
- C.S.R. as Narayana Rao
- Govindarajula Subba Rao as Musalaiah
- Nagabhushanam as Kotaiah
- Dr. Sivaramakrishnaiah as Jagannatham
- K. V. S. Sarma as Nagabhushanam
- Allu Ramalingaiah as Rangaiah
- Padmanabham as Pullaiah's henchmen
- Balakrishna as Pullaiah's henchmen
- Peketi Sivaram as Photographer
- Sowkar Janaki as Kathyayini
- Suryakantham as Jagadamba
- Hemalatha as Seetamma
- E. V. Saroja as Dancer

== Soundtrack ==
Bhagya Rekha

Soundtrack album by Pendyala Nageswara Rao
- Released: 1957
- Genre: Soundtrack
- Producer: Pendyala Nageswara Rao

Music composed by Pendyala Nageswara Rao. The devotional song Neevundeda Kondapai is very popular.All the tunes for all the songs for both languages are the same with slight changes in playback singers.

Telugu Songs

Lyrics by Devulapalli, Kosaraju and Eramaakula Aadisesha Reddy. Playback singers are A. M. Rajah, Madhavapeddi Satyam, Malik, Mohanraj, P. Susheela, Jikki, P. S. Vaidehi & T. Satyavathi.

S. No.	Song title	Lyrics	Singers	length
1	"Manasaa Thelusaa"	Devulapalli	Madhavapeddi Satyam	2:05
2	"Andala Rajevaduraa"	Kosaraju	Malik, Mohanraj, Vaidehi	3:56
3	"Thirumala Mandhira"	Devulapalli	Kandula Mallikarjuna Rao	3:14
4	"Kanne Entho Sundari"	Devulapalli	Jikki	4:01
5	"Neevunde"	Devulapalli	P. Susheela	3:14
6	"Nee Sigge Singarame"	Devulapalli	A. M. Rajah	2:47
7	"Naa Mora Vina Raadaa"	Devulapalli	P. Susheela	2:54
8	"Manasooge"	Devulapalli	A. M. Rajah, P. Susheela	3:40
9	"Kanniti Kadililo"	Devulapalli	A. M. Rajah, P. Susheela	3:56
10	"Lokam Gammathuraa"	Eramaakula Aadisesha Reddy	Madhavapeddi Satyam, Satyavathi	3:38
11	"Ek Buddi Aathanaa"	Kosaraju	Madhavapeddi Satyam, Satyavathi	2:41
12	"Kaaru Chikanti"	Devulapalli	P. Susheela	2:57

Veettukku Vandha Varalakshmi (Tamil) Songs

Lyrics by Kuyilan and C. A. Lakshmanadass. Playback singers are A. M. Rajah, Madhavapeddi Satyam, Malik, P. Susheela, Jikki and P. S. Vaidhehi.

No.	Song	Singer/s	Lyricist	Duration (m:ss)
1		Madhavapeddi Satyam		02:05
2	Ennasai Raaja Evandaa	Jikki & Mallik		03:56
3	Thirupathi Meviya Sundhara	Mallik	C. A. Lakshmanadass	03:14
4		Jikki		04:01
5	En Ullam Than Sondhame	P. Susheela	Kuyilan	03:14
6	En Ullam.... O Radhiye Singaarame	A. M. Rajah	Kuyilan (Pallavi), C. A. Lakshmanadass (From Ninaitthaaye onwards)	02:47
7	En Ullam Than Sondhame	P. Susheela	Kuyilan	02:54
8	Manathode Radhi	A. M. Rajah & P. Susheela	Kuyilan	05:00
9	Kanneerum.... Innaale Nannaal Andro	A. M. Rajah, P. Susheela		03:56
10	Indha Logam Thamasudaa	Madhavapeddi Satyam, P. S. Vaidhehi		03:38
11	Ek Buddi Aathanaa	Madhavapeddi Satyam, P. S. Vaidhehi		02:41
12	Annai Nee Thanthai Nee	P. Susheela		02:57

== Awards ==
- National Film Awards
  - 1957 – National Film Award for Best Feature Film in Telugu
