= Prema Simhasanam =

- Poster
- Directed by: Beeram Mastan Rao
- Written by: Jandhyala (dialogues)
- Screenplay by: Beeram Mastan Rao
- Story by: Beeram Mastan Rao
- Produced by: K. Vidya Sagar
- Starring: N. T. Rama Rao; Rati Agnihotri
- Cinematography: P. S. Prakash
- Edited by: Narasimha Rao
- Music by: Chakravarthy
- Production company: Tirupathi International
- Release date: 14 January 1981
- Running time: 134 mins
- Country: India
- Language: Telugu

Prema Simhasanam (transl. Throne of love) is a 1981 Indian Telugu-language action drama film, produced by K. Vidya Sagar under the Tirupathi International banner and directed by Beeram Mastan Rao. The film stars N. T. Rama Rao, Rati Agnihotri and music is composed by Chakravarthy. The film was a flop at the box office.

== Plot ==
Zamindar Anand Varma comes across a public auction, where a naive woman, Rajeswari, is being sold off. Anand marries her to save her from dishonour. His mother Anasuya Devi opposes this marriage and throws them out after being instigated by her manager, Kamaraju. Anand and Rajeswari start living in the village. After a while, Rajeswari becomes pregnant. One day Rajeswari notices a woman trying to commit suicide and learns that she is Anand's maternal uncle's daughter, Lakshmi. Lakshmi has been in love with Anand from childhood and has decided to kill herself as he has married Rajeswari. Hearing this, Rajeswari assures Lakshmi that she will fulfill her wish. She forces Anand to marry Lakshmi and dies soon after giving birth to a baby boy.

Lakshmi takes care of the baby as her own and consoles a depressed Anand. Eventually, Lakshmi also gives birth to a baby boy. Kamaraju exploits the situation by provoking Anusuya Devi to do away with Rajeswari's son. Kamaraju sends his henchmen to kill the baby. Anand tries to save his son but is killed by the goons. The child is protected by Anand's loyal servant Simhachalam who raises the child. The child, Raja, grows up to be a pop singer and falls in love with Prema. Lakshmi's son Kalyan is a spoiled brat, due to the machinations of Kamaraju and his son Ramanandam. Lakshmi tries to reform Kalyan by keeping him away from Kamaraju. Consequently, Kamaraju and Ramanandham plan to kill her. Raja rescues her and she recognises him as her stepson. Simhachalam tells him the entire story. Raja decides to save his family by destroying their enemies. Raja manages to defeat his enemies, reform his half-brother Kalyan and marries Prema.

== Cast ==
- N. T. Rama Rao as Raja & Anand Varma (dual roles)
- Rati Agnihotri as Prema
- Mohan Babu as Kalyan
- Satyanarayana as Ramanadham
- Nutan Prasad as Kamaraju
- Raavi Kondala Rao as Kesava Varma
- P. L. Narayana as Bhairava Murthy
- Hema Sundar as Simhachalam
- K. R. Vijaya as Lakshmi
- Manju Bhargavi as Rajeswari
- S. Varalakshmi as Anasuya Devi
- Jayamalini in item number
- Pushpakumari as Gajjala Kanakaratnam

== Soundtrack ==
Prema Simhasanam

Film score by Chakravarthy
- Released: 1981
- Genre: Soundtrack
- Length: 26:28
- Label: AVM Audio
- Producer: Chakravarthy

Chakravarthy chronology
Sarada Ramudu (1980)	Prema Simhasanam (1981)	Gaja Donga (1981)

Music composed by Chakravarthy. Music released by AVM Audio Company.

S.No	Song title	Lyrics	Singers	length
1	"Hari Om Govinda"	Veturi	S. P. Balasubrahmanyam, S. Janaki	4:11
2	"Ariveera Bhayankara"	Aarudhra	S. P. Balasubrahmanyam, P. Susheela	4:16
3	"Lalamma Laali"	Veturi	S. P. Balasubrahmanyam	3:37
4	"Jejamma Cheppindhi"	Veturi	S. P. Balasubrahmanyam, P. Susheela	4:20
5	"Chandamaama Kondekkindhi"	Veturi	S. P. Balasubrahmanyam, P. Susheela	4:30
6	"Idhi Prema Simhasanam"	C. Narayana Reddy	S. P. Balasubrahmanyam, P. Susheela	5:34
