= Vaarasatwam =

- Theatrical release poster
- Directed by: Tapi Chanakya
- Written by: Barampuram Kolladi (story / dialogues)
- Screenplay by: Tapi Chanakya
- Produced by: Mangalampalli Brothers
- Starring: N. T. Rama Rao; Anjali Devi
- Cinematography: N. S. Varma
- Edited by: K. A. Marthand
- Music by: Ghantasala
- Production company: Subhodaya Pictures
- Release date: 19 November 1964
- Running time: 135 minutes
- Country: India
- Language: Telugu

Vaarasatwam (transl. Heritage) is a 1964 Indian Telugu-language drama film produced by Mangalampalli Brothers under Subhodaya Pictures and directed by Tapi Chanakya. It stars N. T. Rama Rao, Anjali Devi, with music composed by Ghantasala.

== Cast ==
- N. T. Rama Rao as Raghu
- Anjali Devi as Shanta
- Rajanala as Narasimham
- Gummadi as Venkata Rao
- Relangi as Sanjeevi
- Raja Babu
- Allu Ramalingaiah as Sanyasi
- Peketi Sivaram as Giri
- Vangara as Sidhanthi
- Dr. Sivaramakrishnaiah as Chittibabu
- Narayana Swamy as Vallabharayudu
- Y. V. Raju as Purushotham
- Girija as Seeta
- Hemalatha
- Radha Kumari as Lakshmi
- Surabhi Balasaraswathi as Swarajyam
- Nirmalamma as Kanthamma

== Soundtrack ==
Music composed by Ghantasala.

S. No.	Song title	Lyrics	Singers	length
1	"Perainaa Adugaledu"	Narla Chiranjeevi	P. Susheela	3:13
2	"Sudi Gaalilo"	Aarudhra	P. Leela	2:35
3	"Preyasi Manohari"	Aarudhra	Ghantasala, P. Susheela	3:08
4	"Chilipi Krishnuni"	Narla Chiranjeevi	Ghantasala, P. Leela	2:57
5	"Ichatane Ichatane"	Aarudhra	P. Susheela	3:17
6	"Neemeeda Manasayara"	Aarudhra	K. Rani	3:57
7	"Mana Gutte Thelusukovali"	Narla Chiranjeevi	Ghantasala, P. Susheela	3:44
