= Soudamini =

Soudaamini
- Theatrical release poster
- Directed by: K. B. Nagabhushanam
- Written by: Samudrala Sr. (dialogues)
- Produced by: K. B. Nagabhushanam; Kannamba (Presents)
- Starring: Akkineni Nageswara Rao; S. Varalakshmi; Kannamba
- Cinematography: P. Ellappa
- Edited by: N. K. Gopal
- Music by: S. V. Venkatraman
- Production company: Sri Raja Rajeswari Film Company
- Distributed by: Chamriya Film Distributors
- Release date: 11 April 1951
- Country: India
- Language: Telugu

Soudamini is a 1951 Indian Telugu-language swashbuckler film, produced and directed by K. B. Nagabhushanam, and presented by Kannamba. It stars Akkineni Nageswara Rao, S. Varalakshmi and Kannamba, with music composed by S. V. Venkatraman. The film was a box office hit.

== Cast ==
- Akkineni Nageswara Rao as Udayasena
- S. Varalakshmi as Hemavathi
- C.S.R. as Vikramasena Maharaj
- D. S. Sadasiva Rao as Mahamantri Mahamathi
- S. B. Acharya as Maharshi Bodhayana
- K. Prabhakara Rao as Kamapala
- Kannamba as Maharani Soudamini
- T. R. Rajini as Vilasavathi
- Vanaja as Devayani

== Production ==
The film was also made in Tamil with a different cast and was released as Saudamini.

== Soundtrack ==
Music composed by S. V. Venkatraman. Lyrics were written by Samudrala Sr.

S. No.	Song title	Singers	length
1	"Rama Rama Srirama" (Burrakatha)		
2	"Srisaila Sadanaa"		
3	"Anandamide"		
4	"Yelukora Maa Chelini"		
5	"Kundaradana"		
6	"Vidhinidaatatarama"		
7	"Navamasalu Nindina" (Burrakatha)		
8	"Ko Ko Ani Kusindi"		
9	"Le Le Le"		
10	"Chepu Chepu"		
11	"Valape Telavarenaa!"		
12	"Vasiyu Vangadamukha Lavani"		
13	"Oo Oo Yala Oolaiah"		
14	"Daivame Pagayani"		
15	"Naakai Velasitheva"		
16	"Valachi Cherithiva"		
17	"Ninicheru Daarileda"		
18	"Pathiye Naadibansaaye"		
19	"Bhalanooyi Bhayi Thammudu" (Burrakatha)		

== Reception ==
Andhra Patrika praised the acting skills of the cast. It critiqued the songs as not that natural and that some of them imitated Kannada and Hindi songs. The portrayal of Akkineni Nageswara Rao's mental status as a closed door was inspired from a 1945-film, Spellbound, and questioned whether the audience understood it, the review continued. It criticised the film for not having enough novelty. Zamin Ryot reviewed the film as a typical film which contains errors, improvements and the storyline of a virtuous wife which are found in other Telugu films. It reviewed that film is engaging despite not having a speciality in the storyline. It has the ethos that the Telugu people would find satisfactory, the review continued. It left a mix of praise and criticism of the cast but appreciated sound and photography.
