= Muddula Krishnayya =

- Theatrical release poster
- Directed by: Kodi Ramakrishna
- Written by: Ganesh Patro (dialogues)
- Screenplay by: Kodi Ramakrishna
- Story by: Bhargav Arts Unit
- Produced by: S.Gopal Reddy
- Starring: Nandamuri Balakrishna; Vijayashanti; Radha
- Cinematography: P. Lakshman
- Edited by: K. Satyam
- Music by: K. V. Mahadevan
- Production company: Bhargav Art Productions
- Release date: 28 February 1986
- Running time: 133 minutes
- Country: India
- Language: Telugu

Muddula Krishnayya is a 1986 Telugu-language film produced by S.Gopal Reddy under the Bhargav Art Productions banner and directed by Kodi Ramakrishna. It stars Nandamuri Balakrishna, Vijayashanti, Radha and music composed by K. V. Mahadevan.

== Plot ==
The film begins in a village where a supercilious woman, Mangalagiri Ramanamma, rides over the public. Krishnayya, an audacious nephew to Ramanamma's henpeck husband, Appa Rao, bars her violations. Radha, the vainglorious daughter of Ramanamma, follows in her mother's footsteps. After a series of conflicts, Radha crushes Krishnayya. Aware of this, Appa Rao schemes to reunite their bonds. He tells Ramanamma that the only way to bend Krishnayya is to unite him with Radha. After which, she, too, concurs and keeps a few constraints. Krishnayya also gains the proposal with causes. Currently, Appa Rao, by hook, handles the two and performs the nuptials. Soon after, Krishnayya orders Radha to accompany him, which Ramanamma hinders. As it happens, Radha indicates the alike and rift arises between the couple. Forthwith, reaching home, Krishnayya spots a strange, pretty lady, Shanti, therein, claiming herself as his distant relative and showing excessive secretiveness.

The following day, the village is startled by seeing Shanti comparing well-nigh to Krishnayya's wife, who begrudges Ramanamma & Radha. Likewise, Krishnayya poses intimacy with Shanti to magnify their envy. Hence, they make various attempts to discard Shanti, but in vain. After a while, Ramanamma detects Shanti as a famous film star and informs her men, who land to retrieve her forcibly. Then, Krishnayya obstructs their way, seeks actuality, and reveals that she is his childhood blossom best friend. Right after her parents' death, her aunt adopts and molds her into an actress. Plus, she returned at the time of Krishnayya's wedding and screened the conflict she made in the play. Now, Krishnayya decides to espouse Shanti, which Radha also accepts. Thus, Shanti affirms Radha is reformed, quits the village, and says goodbye to Krishnayya. At last, Ramanamma admits one's error. Finally, the movie ends on a happy note with the reunion of Krishnayya & Radha.

== Cast ==
- Nandamuri Balakrishna as Krishnayya
- Vijayashanti as Vijaya and Shanti
- Radha as Radha
- Gollapudi Maruti Rao as Appa Rao
- S. Varalakshmi as Mangalagiri Ramanamma
- K. K. Sarma
- Telephone Satyanarayana
- Juttu Narasimham
- Dham as Priest
- Kalpana Rai
- Y. Vijaya
- Nirmalamma

== Soundtrack ==
Muddula Krishnayya

Film score by K. V. Mahadevan
- Released: 1987
- Genre: Soundtrack
- Length: 25:22
- Label: SEA Records
- Producer: K. V. Mahadevan

K. V. Mahadevan chronology
Maa Pallelo Gopaludu (1985)	Muddula Krishnayya (1987)	Seetarama Kalyalam (1986)

Music composed by K. V. Mahadevan. Lyrics were written by C. Narayana Reddy. Music released on SEA Records Audio Company.

S. No.	Song title	Singers	length
1	"Ongolu Gittha" (M)	S. P. Balasubrahmanyam	3:54
2	"Em Cheyanu"	S. P. Balasubrahmanyam, S. Janaki	4:03
3	"Krishnaiah Dhookaadu"	S. P. Balasubrahmanyam	5:24
4	"Idhigo Chettu Chaatuga"	S. P. Balasubrahmanyam, S. Janaki	4:36
5	"Ongolu Gittha" (F)	P. Susheela	4:07
6	"Suruchira Sundharaveni"	S. P. Balasubrahmanyam, P. Susheela	3:52
