= Raithu Bidda =

- Directed by: Gudavalli Ramabrahmam
- Written by: Tripuraneni Gopichand; Malladi Viswanatha Kaviraju; Gudavalli Ramabrahmam; Tapi Dharma Rao
- Produced by: Challapalli Maharaja
- Starring: Bellary Raghava; Gidugu Venkata Seethapathi Rao; Bhimavarapu Narasimha Rao; P. Suri Babu; Tanguturi Suryakumari; S. Varalakshmi; Vedantam Raghavayya; M. C. Raghavan; Vangara
- Cinematography: Sailen Bose
- Music by: Bhimavarapu Narasimha Rao
- Production company: Sarathi Films
- Release date: 27 August 1939
- Country: India
- Language: Telugu

Raithu Bidda (transl. Farmer's Son) is a 1939 Telugu social problem film directed by Gudavalli Ramabrahmam. It is a social reformist film during the British Raj, at the time of battle against the Zamindari system. The British Administration banned the film in the region. Ironically, it was produced by one of the Zamindars of the time, Challapalli Maharaja. The film had a public re-release in 1948, after India had gained independence.

== Cast ==
Actor	Character
Bellary Raghava	Narsi Reddy
Gidugu Venkata Seethapathi	The Zamindar
Bhimavarapu Narasimha Rao	Kaasaa Subbanna
P. Suri Babu	Ramajogi
Tanguturi Suryakumari	Seetha
Nellori Nagaraja Rao	Tahsildar
Kosaraju Raghavayya	Raami Reddy
S. Varalakshmi	Beggar Girl
M. C. Raghavan	The Money Lender
Vedantam Raghavayya	Dancer in the Dasavatharam song

== Soundtrack ==
1. "Nidra Melukora Tammuda Gaadha Nidra Melukora Tammuda" - (Snger: P. Suri Babu)
2. "Mangalamamma Maa Poojalu Gaikonumamma" - Group song
3. "Raitu Paina Anuragamu Choopani" - (Singer: P. Suribabu)
4. "Vayinchuma Murali Vayinchu Krishna"
5. "Kanna Biddakai Kalavara Paduchunu Kanneeru Karchunu" - (Singer: P. Suribabu)
6. "Ravoyi Vanamali Birabira Ravoyi" - (Singer: Tanguturi Suryakumari)
7. "Sai Sai Idena Bharathi Nee Pere" - (Burrakatha by P. Suri Babu group)
8. "Sukshetramulu Dayasoonulai Peedinchu" (Poem by P. Suri Babu)
9. "Raithuke Otivvavalenanna Nee Kashta Sukhamula" - (Singers: P. Suri Babu and others)
10. "Dasavatraramulu" - (Veedhi Natakam)
