= Rajaraja Cholan =

1973 film directed by A. P. Nagarajan

- Theatrical release poster
- Directed by: A. P. Nagarajan
- Screenplay by: A. P. Nagarajan; Aru. Ramanathan
- Based on: Rajaraja Cholan by Aru. Ramanathan
- Produced by: G. Umapathy
- Starring: Sivaji Ganesan; Vijayakumari
- Cinematography: W. R. Subba Rao
- Edited by: T. Vijayarangam
- Music by: Kunnakudi Vaidyanathan
- Production company: Ananth Movies
- Release date: 31 March 1973
- Country: India
- Language: Tamil

Rajaraja Cholan is a 1973 Indian Tamil-language historical biographical film directed by A. P. Nagarajan and written by Aru Ramanathan. Based on Ramanathan's play of the same name about the life of the Chola king Rajaraja I, the film stars Sivaji Ganesan in the title role and was the first Tamil CinemaScope film. It was released on 31 March 1973, and ran for over 100 days in theatres.

== Plot ==
During the construction of the Brihadeswara Temple in Thanjavur, Emperor Rajaraja Cholan visits and is greeted by everyone except one sculptor who is deeply engrossed in his work. The emperor and empress then meet Karuvur Devar and are introduced to Tamizharasi, a poet and playwright. Rajaraja reveals that his son Rajendra, along with the Chola army, is helping the Eastern Chalukya king of Vengai Sakthivarman and his brother Vimalathithan reclaim their kingdom from Satyasiriyan.

As the army enters Satyasiriyan's palace, they find Bala Devar tied up, who claims he tried to stop the king from fighting but was ignored. Rajaraja, disguised as a soldier, identifies himself and appoints Bala Devar as his minister despite suspicions from others. He then announces to his noblemen that Bala Devar should be treated with the same respect as himself. Meanwhile, Bala Devar meets Poongodi from his village and shares his desire to overthrow Rajaraja. They plan together, and Bala Devar asks her to stay in the Chola capital. Rajaraja's daughter Kundavai is told by Rajendra that Vimalathithan has brought her a special gift.

Later, Rajaraja, along with his sister and Nambiyandar Nambi, goes to retrieve ancient scriptures from a temple in Chidambaram, which are believed to be the works of saints Sambandar, Appar, and Sundarar. Despite initial skepticism, they find the scriptures in a hidden chamber with the help of golden statues of the saint-poets. Rajaraja emphasizes the eternal nature of the saint's works and their significance. Bala Devar allows Satyasiriyan into his house in the Chola capital through a secret passage where he is questioned about the Chola emperor and his son's potential marriage to Kundavai. Rajaraja scolds Vimalathithan for failing to pay his respects, defended by Vimalathithan. After a heated argument, Vimalathithan warns the emperor not to manipulate his daughter's love. Kundavai vows not to marry anyone who disrespects her father. Vimalathithan encounters Rajendran and warns him of Bala Devar's schemes. The emperor excludes Vengi and Vimalathithan from Kundavai's temple event, leading to tension and confrontation. Vimalathithan attends the event as a commoner and criticizes Kundavai's dance, angering Rajaraja. Vimalathithan warns the emperor against Bala Devar's influence and Rajaraja plans to attack Vengi. Rajendra refuses, leading to conflict within the royal family. The Chola army attacks Vengi, with Rajendran accepting the fight despite Vimalathithan's reluctance. Rajaraja intervenes as a sage, suggesting a duel between Rajendran and Vimalathithan, resulting in Rajendran's victory. Vimalathithan is imprisoned for speaking out against Bala Devar, inciting public unrest. Eventually, Kundavai convinces Rajaraja to release Vimalathithan, but only if Vengi makes unacceptable concessions. The story unfolds with betrayal, power struggles, and personal sacrifices within the Chola empire.

Satyasiriyan sends his guard Ottran to meet Bala Devar on Pournami day. However, Ottran is captured by Rajaraja, who assumes Ottran's identity. Bala Devar informs Rajaraja of a plan to poison him during a feast, with Poongodi aiding them. The plan is foiled when Rajaraja only drinks milk and fruits. Poongodi mixes poison in the milk, but Rajaraja reveals he knew of their plan and informs Bala Devar. Bala Devar pretends to be angry at Poongodi, who is later released along with other prisoners the next day. Rajaraja is praised by all the kings, and Vimalathithan is released. He asks for the emperor's daughter in marriage, leading to suspicion from Bala Devar. Rajaraja reveals Poongodi is a spy working for him, aware of Bala Devar's schemes. Tamizharasi finishes her notes and the two couples marry, with Rajaraja's cleverness and foresight ensuring the safety of the empire and his family.

== Cast ==
- Sivaji Ganesan as Rajaraja Cholan
- Vijayakumari as Cholama Devi
- R. Muthuraman as Prince Vimalathithan of (later king) Vengai Nattu Thalaivan
- Sivakumar as Rajendra Chola I Crown Prince
- Lakshmi as Kundhvai Rajaraja's daughter
- Kumari Padmini as Vanama Devi
- M. N. Nambiar as Bala Devar
- R. S. Manohar as Sathyasiriyan
- Pushpalatha as Sathyasiriyan wife
- T. R. Mahalingam as Karuvur Devar
- Sirkazhi Govindarajan as Nambiyandar Nambi
- S. Varalakshmi as Kundavai Pirāttiyār
- Suruli Rajan as Palace Servant
- Manorama as Poonkodi
- C. I. D. Sakunthala as Dancer
- K. D. Santhanam as Sirpy
- MLA Thangaraj
- Oru Viral Krishna Rao
- Gandhimathi
- S. N. Parvathy
- Master Sekhar as Ponna
- Rangammal - uncredited role

== Production ==
Rajaraja Cholan, based on the life of the Chola king Rajaraja I was a play written by Aru. Ramanathan, and staged by the TKS Brothers in 1955. In 1973, it was adapted into a film by the same name, directed by A. P. Nagarajan and produced by G. Umapathy; Sivaji Ganesan, a self-described Chola, was cast in the title role. Umapathy wanted to film in Brihadisvara Temple, but as he was denied permission, an identical set was constructed in Vasu Studios. Rajaraja Cholan was the first CinemaScope film to be released in Tamil.

== Soundtrack ==
The soundtrack album was composed by Kunnakudi Vaidyanathan. The lyrics were written by Tirunavukkarasar, Kannadasan, K. D. Santhanam, Poovai Senguttuvan and 'Ulunthurpettai' Shanmugham.

No.	Title	Lyrics	Singer(s)	Length
1.	"Thendraloodu"	Kannadasan	T. R. Mahalingam with Sivaji Ganesan
2.	"Thanjai Periya"	Kannadasan	T. R. Mahalingam, Sirkazhi Govindarajan, S. Varalakshmi
3.	"Mayakkum Mannan"	K. D. Santhanam	L. R. Eswari
4.	"Nadanai Kandeanadi"	Thirunavukarasar	P. Susheela, B. Radha
5.	"Mathennai Padaithaan"	Thirunavukarasar	T. M. Soundararajan, S. P. Balasubrahmanyam, M. R. Vijaya, L. R. Eswari
6.	"Yedu Thanthaanadi"	Kannadasan	Sirkazhi Govindarajan, S. Varalakshmi
7.	"Kaththu Thirakadal"	Poovai Senguttuvan	R. Muthuraman
8.	"Unkaiyil En Pillai"	Ulundurpettai Shanmugam	Sirkazhi Govindarajan

== Release ==
Rajaraja Cholan was released on 31 March 1973. The film's prints were taken to theatres atop an elephant. In Tiruchirappalli, fans hired a helicopter and showered flower petals on the print. According to Ganesan, the film did not succeed commercially because "it was not filmed well enough to bring out the ambience or the magnificence of the emperor's personality", and was filmed on the lines of a "family drama". Nonetheless, the film ran for over 100 days in theatres.

== Critical reception ==
The Hindu said, "A great deal of thought and effort has gone into Anand Movies' Raja Raja Chozhan in CinemaScope produced by G. Umapathy and directed by A. P. Nagarajan. The grandeur, majesty and the culture and prosperity of the golden era of Raja Raja Chozhan have been captured faithfully including the building of the Thanjavur temple". The Indian Express said, "The film is lavishly mounted. Muthuraman and Lakshmi impress and Kumari Padmini has given a good account of herself". The Mail said, "As befitting the distinction, it is lavishly mounted, carefully produced and studded with stars. Producer G. Umapathy merits a pat on the back for steering so huge a project safely home".

Kanthan of Kalki called it a respite for audiences tired of watching repeated, identical films. Navamani praised acting, dialogues and direction but criticised the humour and for portraying horse army of Cholan in poor light and concluded saying the film was not as expected and the same time it was neither disappointing.

== Bibliography ==
- Baskaran, S. Theodore (1996). The Eye of the Serpent: An Introduction to Tamil Cinema. Chennai: East West Books. OCLC 243920437.
- Ganesan, Sivaji; Narayana Swamy, T. S. (2007) [2002]. Autobiography of an Actor: Sivaji Ganesan, October 1928 – July 2001. Chennai: Sivaji Prabhu Charities Trust. OCLC 297212002.
