= Sri Venkateswara Mahatyam =

Sri Venkateswara Mahatmyam
- Theatrical release poster
- Directed by: P. Pullayya
- Screenplay by: Acharya Aatreya
- Based on: Avatar of Lord Venkateswara (Balaji)
- Produced by: V. Venkateswarlu
- Starring: N. T. Rama Rao; S. Varalakshmi; Savitri
- Cinematography: P. L. Roy
- Edited by: K. A. Sriramulu
- Music by: Pendyala Nageswara Rao
- Production company: Padmasri Pictures
- Release date: 9 January 1960
- Running time: 180 mins
- Country: India
- Language: Telugu

Sri Venkateswara Mahatmyam is a 1960 Indian Telugu-language Hindu mythological film directed by P. Pullayya and produced by V. Venkateswarlu. It is based on the Venkateswara avatar of Vishnu at Tirumala. It stars N. T. Rama Rao, Savitri, and S. Varalakshmi with music composed by Pendyala Nageswara Rao. The film was dubbed into Tamil and released as Srinivasa Kalyanam.

== Cast ==
- N. T. Rama Rao as Vishnu / Venkateswara
- S. Varalakshmi as Lakshmi
- Savitri as Padmavathi
- V. Nagayya as Hathiram Bhavaji
- Gummadi as Bhrigu Maharshi
- Relangi
- Ramana Reddy as Sarabha
- Rajanala
- Vangara
- Valluri Balakrishna
- Peketi Sivaram
- P. Suri Babu as Narada Maharshi
- Ghantasala as Guest role in the song
- Sr. A V Subbarao as Akasa Raju
- Jr. A V Subbarao as Lord Brahma
- Vempati Peda Satyam as Lord Siva
- Lanka Satyam as Yatrikudu
- Rushyendramani as Dhaaranidevi
- Santha Kumari as Vakula Devi
- Showkar Janaki as Yerukalasani
- Surabhi Balasaraswathi as Sarabha's wife
- Sandhya as Goddess Saraswathi

== Soundtrack ==
Sri Venkateswara Mahatyam

Film score by Pendyala Nageshwara Rao
- Released: 1959
- Genre: Soundtrack
- Producer: Pendyala Nageshwara Rao

Music composed by Pendyala Nageshwara Rao. Music released by Audio Company.

S.No	Song title	Lyrics	Singers	length
1	Jaya Jaya Jaganayaka	Malladi Ramakrishna Sastry	Chorus	6:51
2	Sridevini	Aarudhra	S. Varalakshmi	3:17
3	Pavanambayya	Narapa Reddy	Ghantsala	0:44
4	Kannula	Narapa Reddy	Madhavapeddi Satyam	0:40
5	Namo Narayanaya	Narapa Reddy	Madhavapeddi Satyam	0:23
6	Chilipi Chestala	Narapa Reddy	Ghantasala	0:45
7	Anyuledutanu	Narapa Reddy	P. Suri Babu	0:39
8	Ee Neradarana	Narapa Reddy	S. Varalakshmi	0:47
9	Varala Beramayya	Acharya Aatreya	S. Varalakshmi	3:02
10	Chilako Chikkave	Acharya Aatreya	Pithapuram, Swarnalatha	2:09
11	Gopaala Nandha Gopaala	Acharya Aatreya	Santha Kumari	3:49
12	Ontivaadu	Narapa Reddy	Ghantasala	0:40
13	Naa Kutiramandu	Narapa Reddy	Santha Kumari	0:52
14	Giliginthalu	Acharya Aatreya	P. Susheela, S. Janaki, Vaidehi	5:24
15	Evaro Atadevaro	Acharya Aatreya	Ghantasala, P. Susheela	4:14
16	Chiru Chiru Nagavula	Acharya Aatreya	Santha Kumari, Swarnalatha	3:21
17	Chinnari O Chiluka	Acharya Aatreya	P. Susheela	3:13
18	Kalyana Vaibhavam	Acharya Aatreya	P. Leela, Jikki	5:27
19	Sakala Kalyanabhusha	Narapa Reddy	Madhavapeddi Satyam	0:37
20	Velliraa Maathalli	Acharya Aatreya	P. Leela, Vaidehi	5:10
21	Kalaga Kammanikalaga	Acharya Aatreya	Ghantasala, P. Susheela	3:25
22	Kalayo	Narapa Reddy	P. Susheela	0:39
23	Ee Srinivasudu	Narapa Reddy	P. Suri Babu	1:46
24	Lakshmi Nivasa	Suprabhatam	Ghantasala	0:49
25	Vega Raava	Acharya Aatreya	Madhavapeddi Satyam	2:44
26	Pahihare	Acharya Aatreya	Madhavapeddi Satyam	1:21
27	Padave Podamu Gouri	Acharya Aatreya	Madhavapeddi Satyam	1:34
28	Sesha Saila Vaasa	Acharya Aatreya	Ghantasala	3:03

== Box office and impact ==
It released with twenty prints and had a 100-day run in 16 centers and 175 days in Hyderabad and Vijayawada centers. The deification of Rama Rao began and his residence in Madras became a shrine for pilgrims, who would visit him after a trip to Tirupati. NTR fans waited in long queues outside his house for a darshan of their "living god". They used to apprise him of their problems back home in their villages and he listened to them patiently before rushing to the studio in the morning.
