= Vayyari Bhama =

- Theatrical release poster
- Directed by: P. Subba Rao
- Written by: Acharya Aatreya; Chandarakanth (Story / dialogues)
- Screenplay by: P. Subba Rao
- Produced by: Satrasala Lakshminarayana; P. Subba Rao
- Starring: Akkineni Nageswara Rao; S. Varalakshmi; Sulochana Devi
- Cinematography: Ajaykar; Panchu Chowdary
- Edited by: Surya; Ramakrishna
- Music by: S. Rajeswara Rao
- Production company: Ajantha Pictures
- Release date: 6 June 1953
- Country: India
- Language: Telugu

Vayyari Bhama (transl. Parthenium hysterophorus) is a 1953 Indian Telugu-language swashbuckler film, produced by Satrasala Lakshminarayana, P. Subba Rao under the Ajantha Pictures banner and directed by P. Subba Rao. It stars Akkineni Nageswara Rao, S. Varalakshmi and Sulochana Devi, with music composed by S. Rajeswara Rao. The film was released on 6 June 1953.

== Cast ==
- Akkineni Nageswara Rao as Chandraiah
- S. Varalakshmi as Sudha
- Sulochana Devi as Tara / Vayyari Bhama
- C.S.R as Maharaju
- Vangara
- Chadalavada
- Gangarathnam
- Surabhi Kamalabai
- C. Krishnaveni
- Annapurna

== Soundtrack ==
Music composed by S. Rajeswara Rao.

Song title	Lyrics	Singers
"Raagamu Raaniyave"	Samudrala Sr.	
"Haayiga Haayiga"	Acharya Aatreya	
"Mana Brathuke Nandaname"	Samudrala Sr.	
"Paadina Paata Aadina Aata"	Samudrala Sr.	
"Darulukaacheti Raja"	Samudrala Sr.	
"Ooho Devi"	Samudrala Sr.	
"Yenni Tarala Punyamo"	Samudrala Sr.	
"Chigurukomma"	Samudrala Sr.	
"Raavaiah Ayya Raavaiah"	Samudrala Sr.	
