= Sarada Ramudu =

- Theatrical release poster
- Directed by: K. Vasu
- Written by: Jandhyala (dialogues)
- Screenplay by: K. Vasu
- Based on: Junglee by Subodh Mukherjee
- Produced by: S. Riyaz Basha
- Starring: N. T. Rama Rao; Jayasudha
- Cinematography: P. S. Sundaram
- Edited by: Ravi
- Music by: Chakravarthy
- Production company: Saif Enterprises
- Release date: 14 November 1980
- Running time: 133 minutes
- Country: India
- Language: Telugu

Sarada Ramudu (transl. Funny Rama) is a 1980 Indian Telugu-language comedy drama film directed by K. Vasu. The film stars N. T. Rama Rao and Jayasudha with music composed by Chakravarthy. It is a remake of the Hindi film Junglee (1961). The film was a box-office bomb.

== Cast ==
- N. T. Rama Rao as Madhav
- Jayasudha as Latha
- Rao Gopal Rao as Chidanandam
- Mohan Babu as Sadanandam
- Prabhakar Reddy as Dr. Prabhakar
- Kanta Rao as Raja Rao
- Raja Babu as Manager Sathabhisham
- Nagesh as Server
- Chalapathi Rao as Raju
- S. Varalakshmi as Suvarchala
- Kavitha as Padma
- Vijaya Lalitha as item number
- Jayamalini as Kalpana

== Soundtrack ==
Sarada Ramudu

Film score by Chakravarthy
- Released: 1980
- Genre: Soundtrack
- Length: 21:54
- Producer: Chakravarthy

Chakravarthy chronology
Sardar Papa Rayudu (1980)	Sarada Ramudu (1980)	Prema Simhasanam (1981)

Music composed by Chakravarthy. Lyrics were written by Veturi.

S. No.	Song title	Singers	length
1	"Abbabbo Shoku"	S. P. Balasubrahmanyam, P. Susheela	3:19
2	"Kurra Pitta Kurra Pitta"	S. P. Balasubrahmanyam, P. Susheela	3:11
3	"Manchu Mogga"	S. P. Balasubrahmanyam, P. Susheela	3:24
4	"Amba Palikindhiraa"	S. P. Balasubrahmanyam	3:19
5	"La La La Lakotaa"	S. P. Balasubrahmanyam, P. Susheela	3:14
6	"Okkariddharayye Vela"	S. P. Balasubrahmanyam, P. Susheela	5:27
7	"Challaga Jaari Mellaga Doori"	S. P. Balasubrahmanyam, P. Susheela	4:13

== Reception ==
Mallik of Sitara Weekly criticised the film, stating this is yet another film made with a concept of bad characters strategising to take control of the assets of the rich family. He criticised the characters and music, but appreciated the photography.
