= Sri Gauri Mahatyam =

- Theatrical release poster
- Directed by: D. Yoganand
- Screenplay by: D. Yoganand
- Story by: Malladi Ramakrishna Sastry; Srungaram (main story)
- Produced by: P. S. Seshachalam
- Starring: N. T. Rama Rao; Sriranjani Jr.
- Cinematography: P. S. Selvaraj
- Edited by: V. S. Narayana; Kandaswamy
- Music by: Ogirala Ramachandra Rao; T. V. Raju
- Production company: Mahi Productions
- Release date: 20 October 1956
- Running time: 172 minutes
- Country: India
- Language: Telugu

Sri Gauri Mahatyam (transl. Glory of Goddess Gauri) is a 1956 Indian Telugu-language swashbuckler film, directed by D. Yoganand. It stars N. T. Rama Rao and Sriranjani Jr., with music jointly composed by Ogirala Ramachandra Rao and T. V. Raju.

== Cast ==
- N. T. Rama Rao as Balaveerudu
- Sriranjani Jr. as Gauri
- Kanta Rao as Lord Shiva
- Relangi as Tantalu
- Mukkamala as Bhujanganadhudu
- C. S. R. as Maharaju
- Vangara as Astrologer
- Balakrishna as Rangadu
- S. Varalakshmi
- Suryakantham as Raami
- P. Hemalatha as Satyavathi Devi
- Pushpavalli
- Seeta as Kaami
- Suryakala as Satyabhama
- Latha as Goddess Parvathi

== Soundtrack ==
Sri Gauri Mahatyam

Film score by Ogirala Ramachandra Rao T. V. Raju
- Released: 1956
- Genre: Soundtrack
- Length: 40:21
- Producers: Ogirala Ramachandra Rao; T. V. Raju

Music composed by Ogirala Ramachandra Rao and T. V. Raju.

S. No.	Song title	Lyrics	Singers	length
1	"Sreeminchumaa"	Malladi Ramakrishna Sastry	P. Susheela	6:15
2	"Neevakkada"	Malladi Ramakrishna Sastry	Ghantsala	2:55
3	"Ammaa Neevu"	Malladi Ramakrishna Sastry	R. Balasaraswathi Devi	3:20
4	"Ravayyo"	Malladi Ramakrishna Sastry	Ghantsala	3:08
5	"Aa Kumari"	Malladi Ramakrishna Sastry	Ghantasala	0:49
6	"Neevu Nenunu"	Malladi Ramakrishna Sastry	C.S.R	1:11
7	"Bhale Bhale Garadi"	Malladi Ramakrishna Sastry	Ghantasala	2:22
8	"Tatoku Takatonku"	Malladi Ramakrishna Sastry	Ghantasala	3:02
9	"Siva Manohari"	Malladi Ramakrishna Sastry	Ghantasala, P. Leela	3:02
10	"Taara Reraju"	Malladi Ramakrishna Sastry	P. Leela	2:54
11	"Agarva"	Malladi Ramakrishna Sastry	Ghantasala	0:32
12	"Vallona Sikkindira"	Kosarju	Pithapuram, Jikki	4:44
13	"Sajjana"	Malladi Ramakrishna Sastry	Ghantasala	1:20
14	"Amma Yemamma"	Malladi Ramakrishna Sastry	P. Leela	2:40
15	"Amma Lekapothe"	Malladi Ramakrishna Sastry	Ghantasala	0:50
16	"Neene"	Malladi Ramakrishna Sastry	C.S.R	1:37
