= Sati Savitri (1957 film) =

- Theatrical release poster
- Directed by: K. B. Nagabhushanam
- Written by: Raovuru Venkata Satyanarayana Rao (dialogues)
- Screenplay by: K. B. Nagabhushanam
- Story by: Sri Ramula Sachidananda Sastry
- Based on: Life of Savitri and Satyavan
- Produced by: S. Varalakshmi
- Starring: Akkineni Nageswara Rao; S. Varalakshmi; S. V. Ranga Rao
- Cinematography: Tambu
- Edited by: S. K. Gopal
- Music by: S. V. Venkatraman
- Production company: Varalakshmi Pictures
- Distributed by: Chamriya Takies
- Release date: 12 January 1957
- Running time: 169 minutes
- Country: India
- Language: Telugu

Sati Savitri is 1957 Indian Telugu-language Hindu mythological film, based on the life of Savitri and Satyavan directed by K. B. Nagabhushanam. It stars Akkineni Nageswara Rao, S. Varalakshmi, and S. V. Ranga Rao with music composed by S. V. Venkatraman. It is produced by S. Varalakshmi under the Varalakshmi Pictures banner. The film was dubbed into Tamil language with the title Sathiyavan Savithri.

== Cast ==
- Akkineni Nageswara Rao as Satyavanthudu
- S. Varalakshmi as Savitri
- S. V. Ranga Rao as Yama Dharma Raju
- Relangi as Sharadudu
- V. Nagayya as Aswapathi Maharaju
- Kanta Rao as Vishnu
- Suribabu as Narada Maharshi
- Allu Ramalingaiah as Rama Sharma
- Dr. Sivaramakrishnaiah as Vishnu Sharma
- Rushyendramani as Maallavi
- Suryakantham as Mallika
- Suryakala as Sati Anasuya

== Soundtrack ==
Music composed by S. V. Venkatraman.

S. No.	Song title	Lyrics	Singers	length
1	"Narayanathe Namo Namo"	Raovuri	M. Balamuralikrishna	2:30
2	"Enduko Ohoho Vilasala"	Daitta Gopalam	P. Srinivasan, S. Varalakshmi	3:25
3	"Raavelano"	B. V. S. Acharya	P. Srinivasan, S. Varalakshmi	2:59
4	"Poyenayyo Ippudu"	Raovuri	[Mangalampalli Balamurali Krishna]	2:25
5	"Jalamenin"	B. V. S. Acharya	P. Srinivasan	0:58
6	"Kshtriya Jaati Butti"	B. V. S. Acharya	M. Balamuralikrishna	0:42
7	"Kurula Soubhagyambu"	B. V. S. Acharya	M. Balamuralikrishna	1:41
8	"Jo Jo Bangarubomma"	Daitta Gopalam	Sarojini, Rani	2:19
9	"Kanudammul"	B. V. S. Acharya	M. Balamuralikrishna	1:01
10	"Nammithine Janani"	Raovuri	P. Srinivasan, Sarojani, S. Varalakshmi	4:04
11	"Amba Saasvata Aagamaadi"	B. V. S. Acharya	Pendyala Nageswara Rao	0:40
12	"Aluka Vahinchena"	B. V. S. Acharya	M. Balamuralikrishna	0:53
13	"Villunuboona"	B. V. S. Acharya	Pendyala Nageswara Rao	0:47
14	"Vividhayudha"	B. V. S. Acharya	M. Balamuralikrishna	1:16
15	"Siri Siri Muvvavuga"	Raovuri	Madhavapeddi Satyam, Sarojani	2:39
16	"Adhaarmikula"	Raovuri	Madhavapeddi Satyam	0:40
17	"Amma Kaavave Amma"	Daitta Gopalam	S. Varalakshmi	2:45
18	"Maataa Idena"	Daitta Gopalam	S. Varalakshmi	3:02
19	"Navaratnanchita"	B. V. S. Acharya	S. Varalakshmi	1:03
20	"Pati Bhakti"	B. V. S. Acharya	S. Varalakshmi	0:48
21	"Praananaatha"	Daitta Gopalam	S. Varalakshmi	1:47
22	"Thaguna Idi Janaka"	Daitta Gopalam	S. Varalakshmi	1:37
