= Babruvahana (1964 film) =

1964 film

- Theatrical release poster
- Directed by: Samudrala Sr
- Written by: Samudrala Sr.
- Based on: Life of Babruvahana
- Produced by: C. Jaganmohana Rao
- Starring: N. T. Rama Rao; S. Varalakshmi; Chalam
- Cinematography: Kamal Ghosh
- Edited by: B. Harinarayanaiah
- Music by: Paamarthi
- Production company: Sri National Art Pictures
- Release date: 22 October 1964
- Running time: 145 mins
- Country: India
- Language: Telugu

Babruvahana is a 1964 Indian Telugu-language Hindu mythological film, produced by C. Jaganmohana Rao under the Sri National Art Pictures banner and directed by Samudrala Sr. It stars N. T. Rama Rao, S. Varalakshmi, Chalam, and music composed by Paamarthi. The film is based on the life of Babruvahana, one of the sons of Arjuna.

== Cast ==
- N. T. Rama Rao as Arjuna
- S. Varalakshmi as Chitrangada
- Chalam as Babruvahana
- Kanta Rao as Lord Krishna
- Relangi as Vichitra Vaahana Maharaju
- M. Balaiah as Balarama
- Mikkilineni as Dharma Raja
- Mukkamala as Nagaloka Mahamantri Drutarastra
- C.S.R. as Nagaraja Kouravya
- Vangara as Manipura Mahamantri Bhava
- Peketi Sivaram as Visharada
- Nagaraju as Vrishaketu
- Raja Sulochana as Ulupi
- L. Vijayalakshmi as Subhadra
- Geetanjali as Rukmini

== Soundtrack ==
Babruvahana

Film score by Paamarthi
- Released: 1964
- Genre: Soundtrack
- Length: 26:14
- Label: AVM Audio
- Producer: Paamarthi

Music composed by Paamarthi. Lyrics were written by Samudrala Sr. Music released by AVM Audio Company.

| S. No. | Song title | Singers | length |
|---|---|---|---|
| 1 | "Yelaraa Manohara" | P. Leela | 2:44 |
| 2 | "Manasemo Vayyaarala" | Ghantasala, P. Leela | 3:46 |
| 3 | "Maa Saati Vaaru" | S. Varalakshmi | 2:51 |
| 4 | "Yemani Thaanaaduno" | S. Varalakshmi | 3:08 |
| 5 | "Nee Sari Manohari" | Ghantasala, S. Varalakshmi | 2:56 |
| 6 | "Naa Aasa Virabuse Manase" | P. Susheela | 4:18 |
| 7 | "Ninne Ninne Cheli" | Ghantasala, P. Susheela | 3:04 |
| 8 | "Vardillu Papa" | S. Varalakshmi | 3:27 |
