= Vangara Venkata Subbaiah =

Indian actor

- Born: 24.11.1897; Sangam Jagarlamudi
- Died: 21.08.1975; Duggirala
- Occupation: Actor

Vangara Venkata Subbaiah, better known as Vangara, was an actor of Telugu cinema. He acted in more than 100 films and in some plays.

== Early life ==
He was born in Sangam Jagarlamudi near Tenali. He started his acting career in 1901 in the play Chitranalineeyam at the age of four years. He has worked for sometime as teacher. He joined Rama Vilasa Sabha, Tenali and acted in many dramas portraying various roles. He toured India and abroad with Yadavalli Suryanarayana.

== Filmography ==
1. Balayogini (1936)
2. Mala Pilla (1938)
3. Raithu Bidda (1939)
4. Palnati Yuddham (1947) as Subbanna
5. Mana Desam (1949)
6. Raksha Rekha (1949)
7. Shavukaru (1950)
8. Malliswari (1951)
9. Dharma Devatha (1952) as Duvva
10. Vayyari Bhama (1953)
11. Bangaru Papa (1954)
12. Chakrapani (1954)
13. Peddamanushulu (1954)
14. Donga Ramudu (1955) as School teacher
15. Jayasimha (1955)
16. Kanyasulkam (1955) as Karataka Sastri
17. Bangaru Papa (1955)
18. Santosham (1955)
19. Tenali Ramakrishna (1956)
20. Sonta Ooru (1956)
21. Uma Sundari (1956)
22. Edi Nijam (1956) as Poojari
23. Sri Gauri Mahatyam (1956)
24. Mayabazar (1957) as Sastri
25. Kutumba Gowravam (1957)
26. Panduranga Mahatyam (1957)
27. Chenchu Lakshmi (1958) as Chandamarkula
28. Mangalya Balam (1958)
29. Sri Krishna Maya (1958)
30. Daiva Balam (1959)
31. Sri Venkateswara Mahatyam (1960)
32. Raja Makutam (1960)
33. Mahakavi Kalidasu (1960)
34. Kadeddulu Ekaram Nela (1960)
35. Jagadekaveeruni Katha (1961) as Paata Manthri
36. Intiki Deepam Illale (1961)
37. Bhakta Jayadeva (1961)
38. Batasari (1961)
39. Manchi Manasulu (1962)
40. Bhishma (1962)
41. Savathi Koduku (1963)
42. Narthanasala (1963)
43. Tirupathamma Katha (1963)
44. Somavara Vrata Mahatyam (1963) as Vaidya Shiromani
45. Babruvahana (1964)
46. Vaarasatwam (1964)
47. Vivaha Bandham (1964)
48. Sri Krishna Pandaveeyam (1966)
49. Paramanandayya Sishyula Katha (1966) as Parabrahma Sastry
50. Sati Sumathi (1967)
51. Govula Gopanna (1968)
52. Vichitra Kutumbam (1969) as Lawyer Padmanabha Sastry
53. Ekaveera (1969)
54. Pattindalla Bangaram (1971) as Chin Chong, plastic surgeon from Orient
