= Kadeddulu Ekaram Nela =

- Theatrical release poster
- Directed by: Jampana
- Story by: Jampana
- Produced by: Ponnaluru Vasanthakumar Reddy
- Starring: N. T. Rama Rao; Sowcar Janaki
- Cinematography: B. J. Reddy
- Edited by: A. Nagaiah Naidu
- Music by: C. M. Raju
- Production company: Ponnaluru Brothers Pvt. Ltd.
- Release date: 6 October 1960
- Running time: 112 mins
- Country: India
- Language: Telugu

Kadeddulu Ekaram Nela (transl. Two Bulls and One Acre Land) is a 1960 Indian Telugu-language drama film, produced by Ponnaluru Vasanthakumar Reddy under the Ponnaluru Brothers Pvt. Ltd. banner and directed by Jampana. It stars N. T. Rama Rao and Sowcar Janaki, with music composed by C. M. Raju.

== Plot ==
The film begins in a village where Ramudu, an energetic guy, leads a good life with his 1-acre land & two bulls. He falls for his maternal uncle Suraiah's daughter Seeta. Parallelly, Sowcar Venkaiah, a stingy loan shark, abuses the village by creating debt. Suraiah assists him, and Ramudu turns his tough nut. Meanwhile, it is time for elections and rectitude. Veeraiah triumphs over Sowcar with the aid of Ramudu. Here, begrudged Sowcar falsifies a fake allegation on Ramudu for his dues, which he has already paid. As per lack of proof, the judiciary passed an ordinance that Ramudu must repay the amount within three months. Now Ramudu aims to retrieve his land and moves to the city with his little sibling Gopi, where he toils day & night to raise funds. Besides, Suraiah fixes an alliance for Seeta; she flees to the city in quest of Ramudu and finds his whereabouts. Unexpectedly, Ramudu is incriminated in a homicide case, acquits non-guilty with the support of Seeta & Gopi, and backs to the village. Despite being repaid, Sowcar still needs to hand over the land to Ramudu. Now, all the villagers stand on behalf of Ramudu, including Suraiah. Eventually, Sowcar is backstabbed by his sidekicks when Ramudu shields him. At last, Sowcar reforms after soul-searching and distributes his property to the villagers. Finally, the movie ends happily with Ramudu & Seeta's marriage.

== Cast ==
- N. T. Rama Rao as Ramudu
- Sowcar Janaki as Seeta
- Relangi as Shavukar Venkaiah
- Ramana Reddy as Gumastha Govindaiah
- Vangara as Shavukar's brother-in-law
- Perumallu as Suraiah
- Seetaram as Naamalu
- Surabi Balasaraswathi as Kantham
- Lakshmikanthamma as Ramudu's mother
- Nirmalamma as Suraiah's wife
- Master Venkateswarlu as Gopi

== Soundtrack ==
Kadeddulu Ekaram Nela

Film score by C. M. Raju
- Released: 1960
- Genre: Soundtrack
- Length: 14:01
- Producer: C. M. Raju

Music composed by C. M. Raju.

S. No.	Song title	Lyrics	Singers	length
1	"Yaduntive Pilla"	Kosaraju	J. V. Raghavulu, Vaidehi	3:16
2	"Theeyani Patalu"	Jampana	S. Janaki	2:40
3	"Yugalu Marina"	Jampana	Pithapuram	2:33
4	"Takku Tamaram"	Kosaraju	Swarnalatha	2:35
5	"Chalule Naa Gulabi"	Jampana	P. B. Srinivas, Swarnalatha	2:57
