= Abhimanam =

1960 film

- Theatrical release poster
- Directed by: C. S. Rao
- Written by: Samudrala Jr (dialogues)
- Screenplay by: C. S. Rao
- Produced by: T. Ashwadanarayana; Sundarlal Nahatha
- Starring: Akkineni Nageswara Rao; Savitri; Krishna Kumari
- Cinematography: Kamal Ghosh
- Edited by: C. Hari Rao; N. M. Shankar
- Music by: Ghantasala
- Production company: Sri Productions
- Distributed by: Rajasri Films
- Release date: 26 August 1960
- Running time: 165 minutes
- Country: India
- Language: Telugu

Abhimanam (transl. Self Respect) is a 1960 Indian Telugu-language drama film produced by Sundarlal Nahatha and T. Ashwadanarayana under the Sri Productions banner and directed by C. S. Rao. It stars Akkineni Nageswara Rao, Savitri, Krishna Kumari, with music composed by Ghantasala.

== Cast ==
- Akkineni Nageswara Rao as Venu
- Savitri as Radha
- Krishna Kumari as Kamala
- V. Nagayya as Doctor
- Relangi as O. S. Rao / Sanyasi Rao
- K. V. S. Sharma as Singaraju Lingaraju
- Chalam as Kasulu
- Allu Ramalingaiah as Thalalu
- Kannamba as Lakshmi Kanthamma
- S. Varalakshmi as Suguna

== Soundtrack ==
The music was composed by Ghantasala.

Song title	Lyrics	Singers	length
"Thallini Minchina"	Sri Sri	Jikki	3:04
"Pada Padave"	Samudrala Jr.	Ghantasala, K. Jamuna Rani	3:15
"Ooyalooge Naa Hrudayam"	Arudra	Ghantasala, P. Susheela	3:17
"Dayagala Thallini"	Sri Sri	P. Susheela	6:02
"Madhini Ninnu"	Kosaraju	Madhavapeddi Satyam, J. V. Raghavulu	3:32
"Madhura Nagarilo"	Samudrala Jr.	P. Susheela	5:25
"Oho Basthi Dorasani"	Arudra	Ghantasala, Jikki	3:36
"Rama Idhi Yemi"	Samudrala Jr.	S. Varalakshmi	3:13
"Valapu Thene Paata"	Arudra	Ghantasala, Jikki	3:24

== Reception ==
The Indian Express wrote, "Director C. S. Rao has ably handled his team".
