= Raja Makutam =

- Theatrical release poster
- Directed by: B. N. Reddy
- Written by: D. V. Narasa Raju (story / dialogues); B. S. Ramaia h (Tamil)
- Screenplay by: B. N. Reddy; Padma Raju; B. S. Ramaiah
- Produced by: B. N. Reddy
- Starring: N. T. Rama Rao; Rajasulochana
- Cinematography: B. N. Konda Reddy
- Edited by: Raja Mani; Vaasu Mani
- Music by: Master Venu
- Production company: Vauhini Studios
- Release date: 24 February 1960
- Running time: 179 minutes
- Country: India
- Languages: Telugu; Tamil

Raja Makutam (transl. The Royal Crown) is a 1960 Indian swashbuckler film, produced and directed by B. N. Reddy under the Vauhini Studios banner. Filmed simultaneously in Telugu and Tamil languages, it stars N. T. Rama Rao and Rajasulochana, with music composed by Master Venu.

== Plot ==
On the eve of a festival in a kingdom called Gandhara, the king is assassinated by his vicious sibling & chief commander, Prachanda Simha, to capture the throne for his idiotic son Bhajaranga. Prince Pratapa Simha is currently civilising at the Gurukul cognizant, collapsing, and rushing to the capital. Midway, Prachanda makes a vain effort to eliminate him and is injured. Pramila, a village girl, secures him, whom he incognito and portrays as a migrant. Soon after reaching the fort, Pratap finds the murdered Chief Minister when Prachanda inflames him and counterfeits the royal patriots as traitors. In that rage, Pratap convicts the death penalty to them without trial, in which Pramila's brother is one. So, their families pledge to eradicate the royal clan and build a radical team under the leadership of Surasena.

Beware of Prachanda's satanic hue, Pratap, outbursts when the queen bars and enlightens him. Since they did not have proper armed forces, Prachanda moulded the prince as a formidable foe before the public. She also shows an invisible bridge through which Pratap covertly steps out of the fort to regain people's trust. In proceedings, he is fortuitously acquainted with Pramila, learns about their secret mission, and her loathe for the prince. So, he stays a no victim of royal ruse and words to aid them timely. Following, Prachanda announces Pratap's enthronement when he plots to poison him. He tactically skips it, purports to be insane, and escapes Prachanda's surveillance. Once, the guerrillas intrude into the fort as the stage plays and are seized. Pratap shields them in the disguised form of Nallatrachu, the black cobra, becoming their command and tough nut, Prachanda.

Meanwhile, Pratap & Pramila crush when Surasena irks because he lusts for her. Besides, Prachanda hikes his barbarities on behalf of Pratap, which creates chaos in the kingdom. Exploiting it, Surasena rebels against Nallatrachu because he is avoiding his duties. Ergo, Pratap oaths to slaughter the prince, forges his death, and walks to the hideout. At the back, he smashes and bans Surasena, who is molesting Pramila. Hereupon, malevolent Surasena cabals dismantle the alliance of revolutionaries by merging with Prachanda. Pratap's mastermind arouses enmity between them and hangs Surasena. Prachanda is about to steer Bhajaranga's coronation today when the queen freaks out for justice. However, Prachanda seeks to imprison her by counting the madness. Simultaneously, Pratap onslaughts by taking the fort into his control as Nallatrachu and unveils his identity. At last, Pratap ceases Prachanda when remorseful Pramila pleads pardon. Finally, the movie ends on a happy note with the crowning ceremony and marriage of Pratap & Pramila.

== Cast ==
- N. T. Rama Rao as Prince Pratapa Simha
- Rajasulochana as Prameela
- Kannamba as Queen Mother

Telugu

- Gummadi as Prachanda
- Rajanala as Soorasena
- Padmanabham as Bhajaranga Simha
- Kasturi Siva Rao as Shambhu
- Kaikala Satyanarayana
- Vangara

Tamil

The list is adapted from Film News Anandan's database.

- V. R. Rajagopal
- V. Nagayya
- S. V. Sahasranamam
- K. Balaji

== Soundtrack ==
Music is by Master Venu. There are about 11 songs in the film.

Telugu Songs

Song	Singers	Lyrics	Length
"Anjalide Janani Devi"	P. Leela		02:52
"Edanunnado Ekkadunnado Naa Chukkala Redu"	P. Leela		03:44
"Eti Odduna Maa Vooru"	Jikki		03:28
"Jaya Jaya Manogna Mangala Murthi"	P. Susheela		08:35
"Ninu choosi Neeli.... Ooredi Peredi O Chandamama"	Ghantasala & P. Leela	Balantrapu Rajanikanta Rao	04:31
"Sadiseyako Gali Sadiseya Boke"	P. Leela	Devulapalli Krishnasastri	03:16
"Takita Takita Dhimi Tabala"	Ghantasala	Kosaraju Raghavaiah	
"Kanta Paini Aasa"	Madhavapeddi Satyam & Mallik		02:05
"Jingana Tingana"			03:10
"Raarandoyi"			02:34

Tamil Songs

Lyrics were penned by Thanjai Ramaiah Dass.

Song	Singers	Length
"Maadapurave Odi Varuvaaya"	P. Leela	02:31
"Konji Varum Thendrale"	P. Leela	
"Amba Jagadhamba"	P. Leela	
"Munnale Povanum Thirumbalaama"	Sirkazhi Govindarajan	
"Iravinil Vandhadheno...Ooredhu Peredhu O Vennilaave"	Seerkazhi Govindarajan & P. Leela	04:31
"Vacha Pulliyum Thavaraadhu"	Jikki	
"Gumthala Gumma"	Jikki	03:28
"Vaarungo Vaarungo Vaarungo"	Thiruchi Loganathan	
"Kelaayo Kadhaiyai Nee"	A. L. Raghavan	
"Thakita Thimi"	Seerkazhi Govindarajan	03:38
