= Mahakavi Kalidasu =

- Theatrical release poster
- Directed by: Kamalakara Kameswara Rao
- Written by: Pingali
- Produced by: K. Nagamani; P. Suri Babu
- Starring: Akkineni Nageswara Rao; Sriranjani Jr.
- Cinematography: Annayya
- Edited by: R. V. Rajan
- Music by: Pendyala
- Production company: Sarani Productions
- Distributed by: Navayuga Films
- Release date: 2 April 1960
- Running time: 150 minutes
- Country: India
- Language: Telugu

Mahakavi Kalidasu is a 1960 Indian Telugu-language biographical film directed by Kamalakara Kameswara Rao and written by Pingali. It stars Akkineni Nageswara Rao and Sriranjani Jr., with music composed by Pendyala. It was produced by K. Nagamani and P. Suri Babu. The film is based on the life of the poet Kalidasa.

== Cast ==
- Akkineni Nageswara Rao as Kalidasa
- Sriranjani Jr. as Vidyadhari
- S. V. Ranga Rao as Raja Bhoja
- C.S.R as Rakshasa Kavi
- Relangi as Sutradhari
- K.V.S.Sarma as Hariharamathyudu
- Vangara
- Mudigonda Lingamurthy as King of Avanti
- P. Suri Babu as Bharathacharya
- Rajasulochana as Vilasavathi, court dancer
- Sandhya
- Vasanthi as Goddess Kalika
- T.D.Kusalakumari as dancer
- Master Nagaraju

== Soundtrack ==
Mahakavi Kalidasu

Film score by Pendyala
- Released: 1960
- Genre: Soundtrack
- Length: 38:25
- Producer: Pendyala

Music was composed by Pendyala.

Telugu track list
S. No	Song title	Lyrics	Singers	length
1	"Manikya Veena Mupaalalayanti"	Kalidasa	Ghantasala	4:06
2	"Jaya Jaya Jaya Sharada Jaya Kalabhi Sharada"	Pingali	P. Susheela	3:37
3	"Aa Maatante"	Pingali	Madhavapeddi Satyam, P. Susheela	2:25
4	"Nanu Choodu Naa"	Pingali	Madhavapeddi Satyam, K. Rani	1:44
5	"Neekettundogani Pilla"	Pingali	Ghantasala	5:15
6	"Velugu Velagara Nayana"	Pingali	Ghantasala	2:22
7	"Rasikaraja"	Pingali	P. Leela, Radha Jayalakshmi	4:04
8	"Srikaramagu Paripaalana"	Pingali	P. Leela	3:16
9	"Sakuntala" (Natakam)	Kalidasa	Ghantasala, Jikki	8:33

=== Poems ===
Lyrics were written by P. Suribabu

No.	Song title	Singers	length
1	"Drowpadya"	Ghantasala	0:41
2	"Entha Pralayamu Vachina"	P. Susheela	0:42
3	"Pranakarini Vanuchu"	P. Susheela	1:05
4	"Vagardha"	Ghantasala	0:38

== Awards ==
National Film Awards

- 1960: President's silver medal for Best Feature Film in Telugu
