= Bangaru Papa =

- Poster
- Directed by: B. N. Reddy
- Written by: B. N. Reddy; Palagummi Padmaraju
- Starring: S. V. Ranga Rao; Jaggayya; Krishna Kumari; Hemalatha; Jamuna; Ramana Reddy
- Cinematography: B. N. Konda Reddy
- Music by: Addepalli Rama Rao
- Production company: Vauhini Productions
- Release date: 19 March 1955
- Running time: 183 minutes
- Country: India
- Language: Telugu

Bangaru Papa (transl. Golden Baby) is a 1955 Indian Telugu-language film produced and directed by B. N. Reddy under the Vauhini Productions banner. The film stars S. V. Ranga Rao, Jaggayya, Krishna Kumari, and Jamuna. It is based on the 1861 George Eliot novel Silas Marner.

Bangaru Papa won the President's Silver Medal for Best Feature Film in Telugu at the 3rd National Film Awards. B. N. Reddy considered the film as his best cinematic work. It showcased the acting skills of S. V. Ranga Rao. This film introduced the famous writer Palagummi Padmaraju to the film industry.

== Plot ==
Kotayya (Ranga Rao) is a kind man. He marries Rami. She succumbs to pressure from Gopala Swamy and elopes with him, leaving her husband. Rami and Gopala successfully plan and send Kotayya to jail. After returning from jail, Kotayya becomes a rowdy drunkard. He plans to take revenge and kill Gopala Swamy.

During the fateful night when he prepares to implement his plan, he hears a little child's cries. His humanity overtakes his thirst for revenge. He takes the child, a girl named Papa, under his wings. Papa is the daughter of Manohar (Jaggayya) and Santha (Jamuna). The child's mother has died after giving birth to her. Manohar, the father, remarries.

Kotayya begins a new life in taking care of the child. He leaves rowdyism and drinking. The grown-up Papa is loved by Sekhar, the nephew of Manohar. Learning this, the landlord (Zamindar) calls Kotayya and shows anger with him. Then Manohar announces that Papa is his daughter. The landlord agrees to Sekhar's marriage with Papa and makes Kotayya happy.

== Cast ==
- S. V. Ranga Rao as Kotayya
- Krishna Kumari as Papa
- Jaggayya as Manohar
- Hemalatha
- Jamuna as Santha Manohar
- Ramana Reddy
- Vangara Venkata Subbaiah
- Ramanna Pantulu
- Rama Sharma
- Vidyavathi as Parvati (Manohar's wife)

== Soundtrack ==
Music was composed by Addepalli Rama Rao. Four of the songs including Harikatha were written by Devulapalli Krishnasastri.

- "Harikatha" of Seeta Apaharanam (Lyrics: Devulapalli Krishnasastri)
- "Kanna Devaki Vantu Kanneere Kaani" (Lyrics: Devulapalli Krishnasastri)
- "Kanulakokasaraina Kanapadani Naa Talli" (Lyrics: Devulapalli Krishnasastri; Singer: P. Susheela)
- "Tadhimi Takadhimi Tolubomma" (Lyrics: Devulapalli Krishnasastri; Singer: Madhavapeddi Satyam)
- "Vennela Pandirilona" (Singers: A. M. Rajah and P. Susheela)
- "Vennela Velalu" (Singer: P. Susheela)
- "Yavvana Madhuvanilo" (Lyrics: Devulapalli Krishnasastri; Singers: A. M. Rajah and P. Susheela)

== Awards ==
- 1955 - National Film Award for Best Feature Film in Telugu
