= Sandhya =

Sandhya may refer to:

== Hinduism ==
- Another name of Saranyu, goddess of clouds

== List of people with the given name Sandhya ==
- B. Sandhya (born 1963), Inspector General of Kerala Police in India
- Sandhya Agarwal (born 1963), former captain of the Indian women's cricket team
- Sandhya Dwarkadas, Indian computer scientist
- Sandya Eknelygoda, Sri Lankan human rights activist
- Sandhya Mazumdar, Indian test cricketer
- Sandhya Menon, American young adult fiction author
- Sandhya Mhatre, actress in the 2020 Indian Hindi-language short film Devi
- Sandhya Mukhopadhyay (born 1931), Indian singer and musician specializing in Bengali music
- Sandhya Sanjana, Indian jazz/funk/rock singer
- Sandhya (actress, born 1924), South Indian actress of 1950s and 60s, Mother of former Tamil Nadu Chief Minister J. Jayalalithaa
- Sandhya Shantaram, Indian actress of the 1950s, wife of V. Shantaram
- Sandhya (actress, born 1988), (born 1988), Indian actress in Tamil, Malayalam, Telugu and Kannada films, active 2004–present
- Sandhya Mridul, (born 1975), Indian actress in Bollywood films, active 1993–present
- Sandhya Roy, actress in the Bengali language film industry, active 60s, 70s, and 80s
- Sandhya Kumari, Sri Lankan actress, active 1963–1977

=== Historic ===
- Sandhya, a 13th century ruler from Kamarupa kingdom

== Artistic works ==
- Sandhya Bhraman, a short story collection by Bhabendra Nath Saikia
- Sandhya (album), a 2001 album by Zubeen Garg
- Sandhya (film), 1969 Malayalam language film

== Other uses ==
- Twilight language (sāṃdhyābhāṣā), the polysemic language of ancient scriptures
