= Palagummi Padmaraju =

Indian writer

- పాలగుమ్మి పద్మరాజు (Telugu)
- Born: 24 June 1915; Tirupatipuram, West Godavari district
- Died: 17 February 1983 (aged 67)
- Citizenship: India
- Occupations: Lecturer, writer, poet, lyricist, screenwriter
- Writing career
- Pen name: P. Padmaraju
- Genres: Writer, poet
- Notable work: Galivana
- Notable awards: Sahitya Akademi Award

Palagummi Padmaraju, shortly P. Padmaraju (24 June 1915 – 17 February 1983) was a Telugu writer and winner of Sahitya Akademi Award. He is known for his works in Telugu literature and Telugu cinema.

== Early life ==
He was born in Tirupatipuram in West Godavari District, Andhra Pradesh. He worked as a Science Lecturer in Government P. R. College, Kakinada between 1939 and 1952. His younger brother Palagummi Viswanatham is a veena player, music composer and lyricist.

== Literary works ==
His first story was entitled Subbi. He wrote about sixty short stories. They were published in three volumes titled as Galivana, Padava Prayanam and Eduruchusina Muhurtham.

=== Novels ===
- Batikina College
- Nalla Regadi
- Ramarajyaniki Rahadaari
- Rendo Ashokudi Munalla Palana

=== Films ===
He wrote stories, dialogues and lyrics for some Telugu films:

- Bangaru Papa (1954)
- Bhagya Rekha (1957)
- Bhakta Sabari (1960);
- Shanti Nivasam (1960).
- Bikari Ramudu (1961)
- Bangaru Panjaram (1965)
- Rangula Ratnam (1966)
- Manchi Vallaki Manchivadu (1973)
- Sri Rajeshwari Vilas Coffee Club (1976)
- Sardar Paparayudu (1980)
- Illale Devata (1985)
- Stri (1995)

== Awards ==
- Nandi Award for Best Story Writer - Rangula Ratnam (1966)
- Nandi Award for Best Story Writer - Bahudoorapu Batasari (1983)
- Recipient of Sahitya Akademi Award to Telugu Writers for Galivana in 1985.
- His short story Cyclone won an international prize conducted by New York Herald Tribune in 1952. It was selected amongst 59 stories from 23 countries.
