= Deepavali (1960 film) =

Indian Hindu mythological film

- Theatrical release poster
- Directed by: S. Rajnikanth
- Written by: Samudrala Sr (dialogues)
- Screenplay by: K. Gopala Rao
- Produced by: K. Gopala Rao and Nagisetty Mukunda Rao
- Starring: N. T. Rama Rao; Savitri
- Cinematography: C. Nageswara Rao
- Edited by: N. S. Prakash
- Music by: Ghantasala
- Production company: Aswaraja Pictures
- Release date: 22 September 1960
- Country: India
- Language: Telugu

Deepavali (transl. Diwali) is a 1960 Telugu-language Hindu mythological film, produced by K. Gopala Rao under the Aswaraja Pictures banner and directed by S. Rajinikanth. It stars N. T. Rama Rao and Savitri, with music composed by Ghantasala. This is third film of N. T. Rama Rao as Lord Krishna. The film is a box hit and celebrated 100 days, despite releasing only 6 days after Bhatti vikramarka. It was dubbed in 1974 in Kannada as Narakasura Vadhe,

== Cast ==
- N. T. Rama Rao as Lord Krishna
- Savitri as Sathyabhama and Bhoodevi
- Krishna Kumari as Rukmini
- S. V. Ranga Rao as Narakasura
- Kanta Rao as Narada Maharshi
- Ramana Reddy as Sishyasurudu
- Gummadi as Nagadatta
- S. Varalakshmi as Vasumathi
- Rushyendramani as Deva Maata Aditi Devi

== Soundtrack ==
Deepavali

Film score by Ghantasala
- Released: 1960
- Genre: Soundtrack
- Label: His Master's Voice
- Producer: Ghantasala

Music composed by Ghantasala. Lyrics were written by Samudrala Sr. Music released by His Master's Voice.

S. No	Song title	Singers	length
1	"Namo Narayanaya"	Ghantasala, Madhavapeddi Satyam, A. P. Komala	12:11
2	"Dayadulaina"	Madhavapeddi Satyam	
3	"Mahadeva Deva Mahaneeya"	S. Varalakshmi	
4	"Yadumouli Priya"	Ghantasala, P. Susheela, A. P. Komala	3:30
5	"Poonivoi Tata"	J. V. Raghavulu, A. P. Komala	
6	"Agni Sakshiga"	S. Varalakshmi	
7	"Aluka Manavaya"	Ghantasala	2:14
8	"Haye Haye Andala Raja"	S. Varalakshmi	
9	"Karuna Chudavaya"	Ghantasala	3:13
10	"Devajathiki Priyamu"	Madhavapeddi Satyam	
11	"Amaradhipathyamu"	Ghantasala	
12	"Madekada Bhagyamu"	Ghantasala, P. Leela, A. P. Komala	4:51
13	"Orimi Gonuma"	K. Jamuna Rani	3:49
14	"Deenulapaliti Daivamanudure"	Ghantasala	
15	"O Deva Kanaleva"	Ghantasala	2:58
16	"Paalutrage Nepamuna"	Madhavapeddi Satyam	
17	"Narakuni Rakshimpa"	Ghantasala	1:07
18	"Sariyo Matho Samarana"	A. P. Komala	3:13
19	"Jaya Vijayabhava"	P. Susheela	2:04
20	"Kamsa Bhitini"	Madhavapeddi Satyam	
21	"Nene Srihari Paadapadma"	P. Susheela	
22	"Suralunugothinadu"	Ghantasala	0:53
23	"Vachindi Nedu Deepavali"	P. Susheela	0:44
