= Puvvula Suri Babu =

Indian singer and actor (1915–1968)

Suri Babu
- Born: Puvvula Suri; 22 February 1915; Bommaluru, Gudivada Tq., Andhra Pradesh
- Died: 12 February 1968 (aged 52); India
- Occupations: Actor, Singer, Producer
- Spouse: Puvvula Raja Rajeswari

P. Suri Babu, or Puvvula Suri Babu (Telugu: పువ్వుల సూరిబాబు) (22 February 1915 – 12 February 1968), was an Indian stage and cinema actor and singer. He had a peculiar bold voice and was called Kanchu Kantham Suri Babu.

== Early life ==
Suribabu was born on 22 February 1915 in Bommaluru village of Gudivada taluq, Andhra Pradesh.

== Filmography ==
1. Draupadi Vastrapaharanam (1936) (actor and singer)
2. Kanakatara (1937) (actor and singer)
3. Malapilla (1938) (actor and singer)
4. Raithu Bidda (1939) (actor and singer)
5. Illalu (1940) (actor and singer)
6. Tara Sasankam (1941) (actor and singer)
7. Jeevana Mukthi (1942) (actor and singer)
8. Shri Krishna Tulabharam (1955) (actor)
9. Krishna Leelalu (1959)
10. Sri Krishna Rayabaram (1960) (actor, singer and music director)
11. Sri Venkateswara Mahatyam (1960) (actor and singer)
12. Mahakavi Kalidasu (1961) (producer, actor and playback singer)
13. Usha Parinayam (1961) (actor and playback singer)
14. Dakshayagnam (1962) (actor and singer) as Nandi
15. Somavara Vrata Mahatyam (1963) as Ishwara Bhattu
