= List of Telugu films of 1965 =

This is a list of films produced by the Tollywood film industry based in Hyderabad in 1965.

Title	Director	Cast
Aada Brathuku	Vedantam Raghavayya	N. T. Rama Rao, Kanta Rao, Devika
Aatma Gowravam	K. Vishwanath	Akkineni Nageswara Rao, Kanchana, Rajasree
Akasha Ramanna	G. Vishwanatham	Kanta Rao, Ramakrishna, L. Vijayalakshmi
Antastulu	V. Madhusudan Rao	Akkineni Nageswara Rao, Bhanumathi Ramakrishna, Krishna Kumari
C.I.D.	Tapi Chanakya	N. T. Rama Rao, Jamuna, Gummadi Venkateswara Rao
Chaduvukonna Bharya	Kadaru Nagabhushanam	
Chandrahasa	B. S. Ranga	Rajkumar, Udaykumar, K. S. Ashwath
Devata	K. Hemambharadhara Rao	N. T. Rama Rao, Savitri, V. Nagayya, B. Padmanabham
Dorikithe Dongalu	P. Subrahmanyam	N. T. Rama Rao, Jamuna
Gudi Gantalu	V. Madhusudan Rao	N. T. Rama Rao, Krishna Kumari, Jaggayya
Jwala Dweepa Rahasyam	B. Vittalacharya	Kanta Rao, Krishna Kumari, Mukkamala
Keelu Bommalu	C. S. Rao	Gummadi, Jamuna, Jaggayya, Kannamba
Mangamma Sapatham	B. Vittalacharya	N. T. Rama Rao, Jamuna
Manushulu Mamathalu	Kotayya Pratyagatma	Akkineni Nageswara Rao, Savitri, Jayalalithaa
Naadi Aada Janme	A. C. Tirulokachandar	Savitri, N. T. Rama Rao, S. V. Ranga Rao, Ramana Reddy
Pakkalo Ballem	S. R. Puttana Kanagal	
Pandava Vanavasam	Kamalakara Kameswara Rao	Nandamuri Taraka Rama Rao, S. V. Ranga Rao, Kanta Rao, Savitri
Prachanda Bhairavi	C. S. Rao	
Prameelarjuneeyam	M. Mallikarjuna Rao	NTR, B. Saroja Devi
Pratignapalana	C. S. Rao	
Preminchi Choodu	P. Pullaiah	Akkineni Nageswara Rao, Kanchana, Jaggayya, Relangi
Sati Sakkubai	Vedantam Raghavayya	
Satya Harishchandra	K. V. Reddy	N. T. Rama Rao, S. Varalakshmi, Relangi, Rajanala, Pandari Bai, Gummadi
Sri Simhachala Kshetra Mahima	B. V. Prasad	Kanta Rao, Krishna Kumari, Ramakrishna
Sumangali	Adurthi Subba Rao	Akkineni Nageswara Rao, Savitri
Thene Manasulu	Adurthi Subba Rao	Ram Mohan, Krishna, Sandhya Rani, Sukanya
Thodu Needa	Adurthi Subba Rao	NTR, Bhanumathi Ramakrishna, Ramakrishna, Jamuna
Uyyala Jampala		Jaggayya, Krishna Kumari
Veelunama	K. Hemambharadhara Rao	
Veerabhimanyu	V. Madhusudhana Rao	NTR, Shobhan Babu, Kanchana
Visala Hrudayalu	B. S. Narayana	NTR, Krishna Kumari
Zamindar	V. Madhusudan Rao	Akkineni Nageswara Rao, Krishna Kumari and Nagabhushanam
