= Potti Pleader =

- Theatrical release poster
- Directed by: K. Hemambaradhara Rao
- Written by: Bhamidipati Radhakrishna
- Based on: Idemiti by Bhamidipati Radhakrishna
- Produced by: Padmanabham; Vallam Narasimha Rao; B. Purushottam
- Starring: Padmanabham; Sobhan Babu; Geetanjali; Vanisri
- Cinematography: M. G. Singh
- Edited by: M. S. N. Murthy
- Music by: S. P. Kodandapani
- Production companies: Rekha and Murali Arts
- Distributed by: Vani Movies
- Release date: 5 May 1966
- Running time: 170 minutes
- Country: India
- Language: Telugu

Potti Pleader (transl. Short Pleader) is a 1966 Indian Telugu-language comedy drama film written by Bhamidipati Radhakrishna and directed by K. Hemambaradhara Rao. Based on Radhakrishna's play Idemiti, the film stars Padmanabham in the title role, who also produced the film under the banner Rekha and Murali Arts along with Vallam Narasimha Rao and B. Purushottam. Sobhan Babu, Geetanjali, Vanisri, Ramana Reddy, Mukkamala and Raavi Kondala Rao appear in supporting roles. The film revolves around an LLB graduate positioning himself as a reputed pleader after moving on from a heartbreak. He is later assigned the case of his friend, who is accused of murdering a zamindar for money.

M. G. Singh and M. S. N. Murthy served as the film's director of photography and editor respectively. B. N. Krishna was the film's production designer. S. P. Kodandapani, composed the film's soundtrack and score. Filming took place in sets erected at Prasad Studios in Vadapalani and Saligramam in Madras (now Chennai). Potti Pleader was released on 5 May 1966 and was distributed by Vani Movies. The film was a critical and commercial success, completing a 100-day theatrical run.

== Plot ==
Prasadam is the son of a reputed pleader, whose death pushes their family into poverty. Prasadam's mother wishes to see him practice law as a profession and helps him complete his LLB course with much financial difficulty. By the time Prasadam graduates, his mother dies. To settle the debts made for his education, Prasadam sells his house and farm land in his village, and leaves to the city where his uncle Dhanraj lives.

Dhanraj left the village for employment when Prasadam was a child, and earned riches. His daughter Santha was a good friend of Prasadam. Now as an adult, Prasadam harbours feelings towards Santha. Though critical of his financial status, Dhanraj lets Prasadam stay with them on Santha's recommendation. Prasadam meanwhile manages to befriend Ramarao, Dhanraj's tenant and an unemployed graduate, and they bond well.

Prasadam once expresses to Dhanraj his wish to marry Santha. Initially apprehensive, Dhanraj asks Prasadam to gain stable employment or practice as a pleader, after which he would consider the request. Prasadam accepts and leaves the house, vowing to return after earning fame and wealth. He meets Abaddhala Rao, a senior advocate, and joins as an apprentice. Rao's daughter Vijaya finds Prasadam skilled and befriends him.

As time passes, Prasadam finds himself morally compromised as Rao always manages to twist facts to save his clients, who are usually criminals, and levies wrong cases on the plaintiffs seeking financial benefits from his clients. In one such instance, Prasadam reveals the truth before the judge, who admonishes Rao. Rao and Prasadam have a fallout, and the latter resigns.

One fine day, Prasadam finds that he won two lakh rupees in a lottery. He takes the money and goes to Dhanraj, asking Santha's consent for marriage. However, he and Dhanraj were unaware that Santha and Ramarao were in a long-term relationship. Prasadam accepts her decision and gives the money to Dhanraj, seeking his support for the marriage of Ramarao and Santha. Dhanraj agrees and the marriage is conducted.

Prasadam moves on in life and becomes a reputed pleader in the following years, though people refer to him as 'potti' pleader because of his short height. He then learns that Ramarao has been accused on murdering his friend Narayana Rao, and that he would be executed soon as per the available evidence. Prasadam defends Ramarao, but ultimately fails to win the argument against Airavatam, the public prosecutor.

Prasadam loses hope and reluctantly attends a function on Vijaya's request, where he observes the lookalike of Ramarao, who plans to sell the jewellery he stole after murdering Narayana Rao. Prasadam then realises that the killer, using his resemblance to Ramarao in terms of looks, deceived Narayana Rao and killed him before looting his lockers. By then, he had already made a call to Ramarao mimicking Narayana Rao's voice and summoned him to his residence, thus effectively framing him.

Prasadam, with the help of the police, arrests the killer when he and his accomplice try to sell the jewellery. The killer admits his acts in the court, and Ramarao is exonerated. The film ends with Prasadam marrying Vijaya in a grand ceremony.

== Cast ==
- Padmanabham as Prasadam
- Sobhan Babu as Ramarao / the killer (dual role)
- Geetanjali as Santha
- Vanisri as Vijaya
- Ramana Reddy as Dhanraj
- Mukkamala as Airavatam
- Raavi Kondala Rao as Abaddhala Rao
- Nirmalamma as Prasadam's mother
- Valluri Balakrishna as Chavalayya
- Peketi Sivaram as Lottery agent
- Prabhakar Reddy as Narayana Rao
- Master Visweswara Rao
- V. Nagayya as Judge (cameo appearance)
- D. Ramanaidu as himself (cameo appearance)

== Production ==
During his stint as a theatre artist, Padmanabham and his friend Vallam Narasimha Rao established a production company named Rekha and Murali Arts, named after their children, and staged plays. They entered Telugu cinema later and produced the drama film Devata (1965). At an event celebrating its 50-day theatrical run at Rajahmundry, Padmanabham met playwright Bhamidipati Radhakrishna. They discussed the possibility of adapting the latter's play Idemiti into a film, and chose the title Potti Pleader.

K. Hemambaradhara Rao was signed to direct the film, and Padmanabham's brother B. Purushottam was credited as the producer. S. P. Kodandapani, a regular collaborator with Rekha and Murali Arts since its theatre days, was chosen as the film's music director. Sobhan Babu and Vanisri, then struggling actors, were signed to play Ramarao and Vijaya. Geetanjali and Ramana Reddy were cast as Santha and Dhanraj, with V. Nagayya, D. Ramanaidu and Perumallu making cameo appearances. Apart from them, Padmanabham's son Murali made a cameo appearance in the song "Cheekati Vichunule" as a flutist on the roads.

Potti Pleader received attention from the press during its production phase for hiring five choreographers to compose dance movements for the song sequences: Pasumarthi Krishnamurthy, Thangappa, Chinni, Sampath and K. S. Reddy. M. G. Singh and M. S. N. Murthy served as the film's director of photography and editor respectively. B. N. Krishna was the film's production designer. Potti Pleader was also known for its opening credits, where Padmanabham himself would introduce all the cast and crew who worked for the film. Filming took place in sets erected at Prasad Studios in Vadapalani and Saligramam in Madras (now Chennai).

== Music ==
S. P. Kodandapani composed the film's soundtrack and score; soundtrack consists of 7 tracks all written by different lyricists. The track "Cheekati Vichunule" was used extensively in the score as the theme music.

| Track | Song | Lyrics | Singer(s) |
|---|---|---|---|
| 1 | "Cheekati Vichunule" | Kosaraju Raghavaiah | Ghantasala |
| 2 | "Oogenu Manasu" | Daasarathi Krishnamacharyulu | P. B. Sreenivas, P. Susheela |
| 3 | "Andamannadi Neelo Chudali" | Aarudhra | Pithapuram Nageswara Rao, S. Janaki, Madhavapeddi Satyam |
| 4 | "Jhallumani Nanu" | Veturi | Jayadev, Sumitra |
| 5 | "Po Po Po Po Potti Pleader" | Appalacharya | L. R. Eswari, Padmanabham |
| 6 | "Lalijo Lalijo" | Sri Sri | P. Susheela |
| 7 | "Idhigo Idhigo Tamasha" | Rajasri | S. Janaki & Chorus |

== Release and reception ==
Potti Pleader was released on 5 May 1966 and was distributed by Vani Movies. The film was a critical and commercial success, completing a 100-day theatrical run.
