= Nandi Awards of 1970 =

Indian Telugu film and TV awards ceremony

The Nandi Awards were presented annually by the Government of Andhra Pradesh to recognise excellence in Telugu cinema, theatre, and television. The first awards were given in 1964. The recipients of the best film awards in 1970 were the following.

== 1970 Nandi Awards Winners List ==
Category	Winner	Film
Best Feature Film	B. Padmanabham	Kathanayika Molla
Second Best Feature Film	D. Yoganand	Kodalu Diddina Kapuram
Third Best Feature Film	Bapu	Balaraju Katha
