= Sri Sri Sri Maryada Ramanna =

1967 Telugu film by K. Hemambharadhara Rao

- Poster
- Directed by: K. Hemambaradhara Rao
- Written by: Veeturi
- Produced by: B. Purushottham; Padmanabham (Presenter)
- Starring: Padmanabham; Geetanjali; Mukkamala; Rajasree; Haranath; Rajanala; Ramakrishna; Shobhan Babu; Krishna
- Cinematography: J. Satyanarayana
- Music by: S. P. Kodandapani
- Production companies: Rekha & Murali Productions
- Release date: 1967
- Running time: 133 min
- Country: India
- Language: Telugu

Sri Sri Sri Maryada Ramanna is a 1967 Telugu-language comedy drama film directed by K. Hemambharadhara Rao and written by Veeturi. The film stars Padmanabham in the title role, alongside Geetanjali, Mukkamala, Rajanala, Prabhakar Reddy, and Raja Babu in supporting roles. Krishna, Sobhan Babu, and Haranath made guest appearances in a song featuring Rajasree. The music for Sri Sri Sri Maryada Ramanna was composed by S. P. Kodandapani, with lyrics by Veeturi.

The film explores the story of a shepherd boy, Rami, who transforms into Ramanna with the blessings of a sage and helps resolve the kingdom's oppressive taxation issues. Known for blending comedy with a socially relevant theme, the film became commercially successful.

Notably, the film marked the playback singing debut of S. P. Balasubrahmanyam, who sang the song "Emiyee Vinta Moham!" under the guidance of his mentor, S. P. Kodandapani. His performance was very well received, and marked the beginning of his playback singing career.

== Plot ==
The story follows a shepherd boy named Rami, who transforms into Ramanna with the blessings of a sage. The kingdom is plagued by the oppressive taxation policies enforced by a Minister and the Army Commander. When Ramanna learns of the hardships faced by the people, he informs the King, who offers him the opportunity to rule the kingdom for three months and resolve the issues. Ramanna accepts the challenge, successfully addresses the problems and gains the admiration of the people. In the process, he also wins the heart of the princess.

== Cast ==
- Padmanabham as Maryada Ramanna / Rami
- Geetanjali as Madhuri Devi
- Mukkamala as Vichitra Sena
- Rajanala as Veerabhadrudu
- Prabhakar Reddy as Kotilingam
- Perumallu as Minister
- Raja Babu as Sukumarudu
- Potti Prasad as Viddooram
- Balakrishna as Thippanna

Guest appearance

- Haranath
- Sobhan Babu
- Krishna
- Ramakrishna
- Rajasree
- Satyanarayana
- Mikkilineni

== Production ==
Sree Sree Sree Maryada Ramanna was produced by B. Purushottham, the brother of actor Padmanabham, under the banner of Rekha and Murali Arts. Padmanabham also presented the film. This project marked the third production by the banner, following the successes of Devatha (1965) and Potti Pleader (1966). The film was conceived as a comedy with a socially relevant theme, blending Padmanabham's comedic expertise with a message-oriented narrative.

The production team continued their strategy of featuring prominent actors in guest roles, a tactic that had proved successful in their earlier films. For this film, Krishna, Sobhan Babu, and Haranath appeared in a song alongside actress Rajasree, enhancing the film's appeal. Music director S. P. Kodandapani made a brief on-screen appearance, portraying a petitioner in the King's court who raises a complaint about a cat. This marked his second acting role, following his debut as a music conductor in Potti Pleader. Producer B. Purushottham, Padmanabham's brother, also shared the screen with Kodandapani in this sequence.

The indoor scenes of the film were shot at Golden Studios and Prasad Studios in Madras, while the outdoor sequences were filmed in Padamu village, located in Chittoor district. One of the notable scenes, a tiger fight, was shot using a real tiger at Golden Studios. To ensure safety, the tiger's jaws were stitched together, though the sequence remained highly risky to execute.

== S. P. Balasubrahmanyam's debut ==
Sree Sree Sree Maryada Ramanna marked the playback singing debut of S. P. Balasubrahmanyam, facilitated by music director S. P. Kodandapani. Kodandapani first recognized Balasubrahmanyam's talent during a singing competition in Madras in 1963 and later introduced him to the film's producer, Padmanabham. To demonstrate his abilities, Balasubrahmanyam performed songs like "Mere Mehboob" and "Pibare Ramarasam", impressing Padmanabham and securing his selection.

Balasubrahmanyam was assigned to sing the song "Emi Yee Vinta Moham", originally intended for veteran singer Ghantasala. Due to Ghantasala's unavailability, Balasubrahmanyam was asked to record the song temporarily, with the option to replace it later. Dedicated to making a strong impression, Balasubrahmanyam practiced extensively and recorded the song in a single take on 15 December 1966.

His rendition, performed alongside notable singers like P. B. Sreenivas, Kalyanam Raghuramaiah, and P. Suseela, received praise. When Ghantasala returned and reviewed the recording, he approved Balasubrahmanyam's version, leading to its inclusion in the final soundtrack. This opportunity launched Balasubrahmanyam's illustrious playback singing career.

== Music ==
Music for the film was composed by S. P. Kodandapani and lyrics were written by Veeturi.

Track list
No.	Title	Lyrics	Singer(s)	Length
1.	"Harihari Naaraayano Aadi Naaraayano"	Veeturi	T. M. Soundararajan
2.	"Sreekarudu Harudu (Verse)"	Veeturi	Kalyanam Raghuramaiah
3.	"Emiyee Vinta Moham!"	Veeturi	P. Suseela, S. P. Balasubrahmanyam, Kalyanam Raghuramaiah, P. B. Sreenivas
4.	"Mangideelu Mangideelu O Poolabhaamaa!"	Veeturi	Pithapuram Nageswara Rao, P. Suseela
5.	"Neeve Neeve Naa Daivamu, Neeve Naa Bhagyamu"	Veeturi	P. Suseela
6.	"Vennelagaa Undi"	Veeturi	K. J. Yesudas, P. Suseela

== Reception ==
The film was commercially successful. Plans to dub the film into Tamil did not materialize due to unforeseen circumstances. Padmanabham considered Sri Sri Sri Maryada Ramanna a landmark project in his extensive career, spanning over 400 films.
