= Dandamudi Rajagopal =

Indian weightlifter (1916–1981)

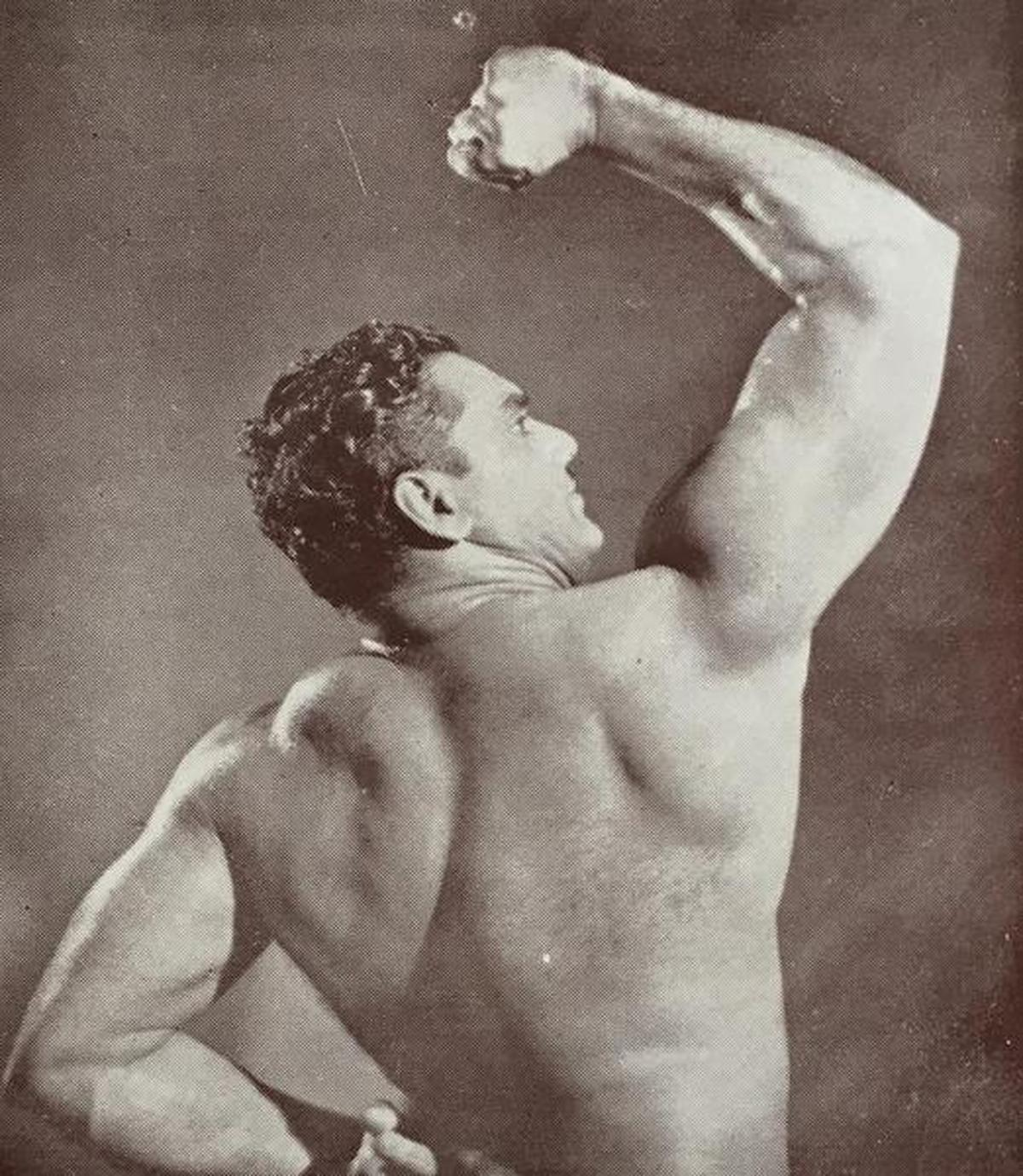
- Rao in 1948

Personal information
- Full name: Dandamudi Rajagopal Rao
- Nicknames: Mr. Asia, Andhra Bhima, Andhra Hercules, Indian Tarzan, Giant of India
- National team: India
- Born: 16 October 1916 Gandigunta, Krishna district, Madras Presidency, British India (present-day Andhra Pradesh, India)
- Died: 6 August 1981 (aged 64)
- Height: 6 ft (182 cm)
- Spouse: Dandamudi Anasuya
- Children: 5

Sport
- Country: India
- Sport: Weightlifting
- Weight class: Men's heavyweight
- Coached by: Sistla Somayajulu

Achievements and titles
- Olympic finals: 1948, 1952, 1956
- Regional finals: 1951 Asian Games
Medal record
Men's weightlifting
Representing India
Asian Games
Bronze medal – third place	1951 New Delhi	+90 kg

Dandamudi Rajagopal Rao (16 October 1916 – 6 August 1981) was an Indian weightlifter, bodybuilder, actor, sports administrator and coach. He won a bronze medal in the 1951 Asian Games in men's heavyweight (+90 kg) weightlifting. He represented India in the heavyweight (>90 kg) weightlifting events at both the 1948 London Olympics and the 1956 Melbourne Olympics. He was the founder and first President of the Andhra Olympic Association, and served as the captain of Andhra Olympic Team.

== Sports achievements ==
In 1946, he won 1st place in weightlifting at the XII Olympic Sports Event of India held in Bangalore, for the heavyweight class. He annexed Kerala title in 1942 and the Bombay provincial honours in 1944 breaking all the previous records. He represented India in International competitions held in Burma in 1947. He won gold medal in Indian Olympic Sports Event held at Delhi in 1952. He lifted 780 pounds in the Heavyweight Category. In 1954 Indian Olympic Sports Event he won Gold medal again and established three records.

Rajagopal was the 1st Indian Weightlifting Champion and held the title continuously for 13 years from 1945 to 1958. He won Mr. Asia title in 1948 at Calcutta at the Asian bodybuilding competition.

He won a bronze medal in 1951 Asian Games in men's heavyweight (+90 kg) weightlifting which remains one of the best performances by an Indian weightlifter considering the strong field of countries participating.

Rajagopal represented India thrice at the Olympics, in 1948 (finishing 16th), 1952 (finishing 6th) and 1956 (finishing 9th).

He was the founder and first President of Andhra Olympic Association. He was the captain of Andhra Olympic team. He helped found several other sports associations in Andhra Pradesh.

Kamineni Eswara Rao was trained by Dandamudi in weightlifting. He established free gymnasia named Dandamudi Rajagopal Institutes, at locations across Krishna district to coach youngsters.

== Honours and popularity ==
Dandamudi was the first Indian to receive title of Mr. Asia. He was conferred with other titles such as Andhra Bhima, Andhra Hercules, Indian Tarzan and Giant of India. His feats attracted people from all over the country. One of his notable, dangerous and jaw dropping feats of strength which drew huge crowds were displays where he would break iron chains around his body by taking a deep breath and flexing his muscles.

== Film career ==
Dandamudi acted in several films. The most notable performance was in Nartanasala (1963), wherein he portrayed the role of Bhima. He also acted in Bhimanjaneya Yuddham and Veeraabhimanyu. In his short stint in the silver screen, Dandamudi acted alongside stalwarts like N. T. Rama Rao, Savitri, Shoban Babu, S. V. Ranga Rao, Kanta Rao, Mukkamala and Mikkilineni.

== Personal life ==
Rajagopal was born on 16 October 1916 in Gandigunta village, Krishna district (in present day Andhra Pradesh), to a family of farmers. Impressed by the bodybuilder Kodi Rammurthy Naidu, he took up the sport of weightlifting. He was trained by Sistla Somayajulu in weightlifting for some time. Later he traveled with Kolli Rangadasu and gave many performances in different Indian states and countries.

He was married to Anasuya. The couple had 5 children - Jhansi Lakshmibai, Purnachandra Rao, Shyamasundara Rao, Basavaraja Rao and Vijayalakshmi.

Rajagopal died on 6 August 1981, at the age of 64. An indoor stadium, Dandamudi Rajagopal Rao Indoor Stadium, was donated by and named after him at Benz Circle, Vijayawada. The stadium was inaugurated by then Chief Minister of Andhra Pradesh Tanguturi Anjaiah.
