= S. P. Kodandapani =

S. P. Kodandapani ఎస్. పి. కోదండపాణి
- Born: Sripathi Panditharadhyula Kodandapani; 1932
- Died: 5 April 1974 (aged 42)
- Genres: Playback singing
- Occupations: Music director, singer
- Years active: 1950s–1970s

Sripathi Panditharadhyula Kodandapani (c. 1932 – 5 April 1974) was an Indian music composer and playback singer in Telugu cinema. He made his debut as an playback singer in the 1955 film Santhanam. Later, he debuted as a music director in the 1961 film Kanna Koduku. Early in his career, he gained fame as a composer for folklore-based films. Later, he composed films in varied genres.

Kodandapani's notable films as a music director include Guruvunu Minchina Sishyudu (1963), Thotalo Pilla - Kotalo Rani (1964), Jwala Dweepa Rahasyam (1965), Bangaru Timmaraju (1965), Devata (1965), Sri Sri Sri Maryada Ramanna (1967), Gopaludu Bhoopaludu (1967), Sukha Dukhalu (1968), Manchi Kutumbam (1968), Manchi Mitrulu (1969), Kathanayika Molla (1970), Pandanti Kapuram (1972). Some of his notable compositions include songs like "Aalayaana Velasina Aa Devudi Reethi" from Devata, "Idi Mallela Velayani" and "Medante Meda Kadu" from Sukha Dukhalu.

He introduced S. P. Balasubrahmanyam to playback singing in the film Sri Sri Sri Maryada Ramanna (1967) and mentored him in his early career. Balasubrahmanyam considered Kodandapani to be his guru and would reminisce Kodandapani throughout his life and would often pay tributes to him. Kodandapani died on 5 April 1974 at a relatively young age of 42.

== Life ==
S. P. Kodandapani was born in 1932 in Guntur. He spent his childhood in Guntur. He used to sing songs and poems and learned to play harmonium. He went to Madras looking for opportunities to work in the film industry. Addepalli Rama Rao gave him a chance to sing in the chorus in the 1953 film Naa Illu. Later, he worked as a harmonium player with Susarla Dakshinamurthi. He sang as an independent singer in the 1955 film Santhanam. He also worked with the music director K. V. Mahadevan for some time.

He became music director as an independent charge for the first time in Kanna Koduku (1961), followed by Padandi Munduku (1962), Manchi Rojulochayi, Bangaru Timmaraju (1964), Thotalo Pilla - Kotalo Rani (1964), Loguttu Perumallakeruka (1966) and others. The song "Medante Meda Kaadu" from the film Sukha Dukhalu (1968) composed by him brought recognition to Balasubrahmanyam in Telugu cinema.

Kodandapani is the music director in the Rekha Murali and Arts production company established by comedian and his former roommate Padmanabham.

== Legacy ==
Kodandapani introduced S. P. Balasubrahmanyam to playback singing in the film Sri Sri Sri Maryada Ramanna (1967) and mentored him in his early career. Balasubrahmanyam considered Kodandapani to be his guru and would reminisce Kodandapani throughout his life and would often pay tributes to him. He named his recording theatre after Kodandapani. He also named his film production company after him as 'Sri Kodandapani Film Circuits'.

== Filmography ==
=== Composer ===
Year	Film	Language	Director	Banner	Notes
1961	Kanna Kodulu	Telugu	Krishna Rao	K. P. Art Productions	
1961	Viplava Veerudu	Telugu	G. K. Ramu	P. S. V. Pictures	
1962	Ekaika Veerudu	Telugu	M. Natesan	Natesh Art Pictures	with Viswanathan–Ramamoorthy
1962	Naagamalai Azhagi	Tamil	G. Viswanathan	Madheswari Films	with T. A. Mothi
1962	Padandi Munduku	Telugu	V. Madhusudhana Rao	Jagruthi Chithra	
1963	Guruvunu Minchina Sishyudu	Telugu	B. Vittalacharya	Vithal Productions	
1963	Manchi Rojulu Vastayi	Telugu	G. Viswanathan	Kausalya Productions	
1963	Naga Devatha	Telugu	Shanthilal Sony		
1964	Bangaru Thimmaraju	Telugu	G. Viswanathan	Gauri Productions	
1964	Thotalo Pilla Kotalo Rani	Telugu	G. Viswanathan	Gauri Productions	
1965	Akasha Ramanna	Telugu	G. Viswanathan	Gauri Productions	
1965	Devata	Telugu	K. Hemambharadhara Rao	Rekha & Murali Combines	
1965	Jwaladweepa Rahasyam	Telugu	B. Vittalacharya	Madhu Pictures	
1965	Kathanayakudu Katha	Telugu	B. R. Panthulu	Padmini Pictures	
1965	Keelu Bommalu	Telugu	C. S. Rao	Hyderabad Movies	
1965	Pakkalo Ballem	Telugu	Puttanna Kanagal	Sivashakti Movies	
1966	Aata Bommalu	Telugu	G. Viswanathan	Suvarna Films	
1966	Bhulokamlo Yamalokam	Telugu	G. Viswanathan	Gauri Productions	
1966	Loguttu Perumallakeruka	Telugu	K. S. R. Doss	Gauri Productions	
1966	Love in Bangalore	Kannada	Kalyan Kumar		
1966	Potti Pleader	Telugu	K. Hemambaradhara Rao	Rekha and Murali Arts	
1967	Apoorva Piravaigal	Telugu			
1967	Iddaru Monagallu	Telugu	B. Vittalacharya	Madhu Pictures	
1967	Satyame Jayam	Telugu	P. V. Rama Rao	Indira Ramana Pictures	
1967	Sri Sri Sri Maryada Ramanna	Telugu	K. Hemambaradhara Rao	Rekha and Murali Arts	
1968	Bhale Monagadu	Telugu	B. Vittalacharya	Sunandini Pictures	
1968	Manchi Kutumbam	Telugu	V. Madhusudhana Rao	Madhu Pictures	
1968	Mooga Jeevulu	Telugu	G. Varalakshmi	Chandrasekhara Films	
1968	Nenante Nene	Telugu	V. Ramachandra Rao	Sujatha Films	
1968	Pedharasi Pedamma Katha	Telugu	Giduthuri Suryam	P. S. R. Pictures	
1968	Ranabheri	Telugu	Giduthuri Suryam	P. S. R. Pictures	
1968	Sukha Dukhalu	Telugu	I. N. Murthy	Sri Vijayabhat Movies	
1969	Aastulu Antastulu	Telugu	V. Ramachandra Rao	Shree Productions	
1969	Gandara Gandadu	Telugu	K. S. R. Doss	Sanjeevini Films	
1969	Gopaludu Bhoopaludu	Telugu	G. Viswanathan	Gauri Productions	
1969	Jagath Kiladeelu	Telugu	I. N. Murthy	Phalguna Pictures	
1969	Kuzhandai Ullam	Tamil	Savitri	Sri Savitri Productions	
1969	Mahabaludu	Telugu	Ravikant Nagaich	Bharti Pictures	
1969	Manchi Mitrulu	Telugu	T. Rama Rao	Madhu Pictures	
1969	Sri Rama Katha	Telugu	B. Padmanabham	Rekha and Murali Arts	
1969	Ukku Pidugu	Telugu	G. Viswanathan	Navbharat Combines	
1970	Inti Gowravam	Telugu	Bapu	Madhu Pictures	
1970	Janma Bhoomi	Telugu	G. Viswanathan	T. C. S. Pictures	
1970	Kathanayika Molla	Telugu	B. Padmanabham	Rekha and Murali Arts	
1970	Lakshmi Kataksham	Telugu	B. Vittalacharya	P. S. R. Pictures	
1970	Oke Kutumbham	Telugu	A. Bhimsingh	Ravi Art Theatres	
1970	Pachani Samsaram	Telugu	Lakshmi Deepak	B. N. Movies	
1970	Pelli Kuthuru	Telugu	V. Ramachandra Rao	Shree Productions	
1970	Suguna Sundari Katha	Telugu	H. S. Venu	P. S. R. Pictures	
1971	Andham Kosam Pandem	Telugu	Aamancharla Seshagiri Rao	Hrishikesh Pictures	
1971	Basthi Bull Bull	Telugu	G. V. R. Seshagiri Rao	Shriram Arts	
1971	Jagath Jettilu	Telugu	P. A. Kameswara Rao & K. Raghava	Phalguna Pictures	
1971	Jatakaratna Gundaajoisa	Kannada	B. Padmanabham	Rekha and Murali Arts	
1971	Jathakaratna Midatham Bhotlu	Telugu	B. Padmanabham	Rekha and Murali Arts	
1971	Kiladi Singanna	Telugu	I. N. Murthy	Supraja Pictures	
1971	Vintha Samsaram	Telugu	Savitri	Savitri Combines	
1972	Adhrusta Devatha	Telugu	K. S. R. Doss	Sri Vijayalalita Pictures	
1972	Guduputani	Telugu	Lakshmi Deepak	Trimurthy Productions	
1972	Pandanti Kapuram	Telugu	Lakshmi Deepak	Jayaprada Pictures	
1972	Shabhash Papanna	Telugu	Shaheed Lal	Saubhagya Kala Chitra	
1972	Shanthi Nilayam	Telugu	C. Vaikuntarama Sharma	Sri Ganesh Chitralaya	
1972	Vintha Dhampathulu	Telugu	K. Hemambharadhara Rao	Subhashini Art Pictures	
1973	Abhimanavantulu	Telugu	K. S. Rami Reddy	Sri Ramakrishna Films	
1973	Aajanma Brahmachari	Telugu	B. Padmanabham	Rekha and Murali Arts	
1973	Gandhi Puttina Desam	Telugu	Lakshmi Deepak	Jayaprada Art Pictures	
1973	Inti Dongalu	Telugu	K. Hemambharadhara Rao	Subhashini Art Picture	
1973	Mallamma Katha	Telugu	Akkineni Sanjeevi	R. S. Movies	
1975	Bharathi	Telugu	Veeturi	Manoranjani Pictures	K. Chakravarthy
1975	Bhagasthulu	Telugu	A. Bhimsingh	Ravi Art Theaters	
1986	Hasyabhishekamu	Telugu			

=== Singer ===
Year	Film	Language	Song	Co-singer	Music
1954	Vaddante Dabbu	Telugu	Thimtalangthom	A. V. Saraswathi, Rohini, V. Ramakrishna & M. V. Raju	T. A. Kalyanam
1955	Santhanam	Telugu	Kanumoosinaka.... Santhoshamela Sangeethamela	K. Jamuna Rani	S. Dakshinamurthi
1960	Annapurna	Telugu	Neevevvaro Chirunavvulato	K. Rani	S. Dakshinamurthi
1972	Pandanti Kapuram	Telugu	Idhigo Devudu Chesina Bomma	P. Susheela	S. P. Kodandapani
