= Bangaru Manishi =

- Theatrical release poster
- Directed by: A. Bhimsingh
- Written by: Gollapudi (dialogues)
- Screenplay by: A. Bhimsingh
- Story by: Triveni Unit
- Produced by: P. Perraju
- Starring: N. T. Rama Rao; Lakshmi; Hema Chaudhary
- Cinematography: G. Vital Rao
- Edited by: Pal Dorasingam
- Music by: K. V. Mahadevan
- Production company: Triveni Productions
- Release date: 25 August 1976
- Running time: 140 mins
- Country: India
- Language: Telugu

Bangaru Manishi (transl. Golden Man) is a 1976 Indian Telugu-language drama film co-written and directed by A. Bhimsingh. It stars N. T. Rama Rao, Lakshmi and Hema Choudhary, with music composed by K. V. Mahadevan. The film was commercially successful.

== Cast ==
- N. T. Rama Rao as Venu
- Lakshmi as Geetha
- Hema Chaudhary as Padma
- Gummadi as Ranganna
- Prabhakar Reddy as Bhanoji Rao
- Sridhar as Prasad
- Sarath Babu as Madhu
- Allu Ramalingaiah as Bhaja Govindam
- Rao Gopal Rao as Satyam
- Pandari Bai as Seeta
- Mikkilineni as Chandra Shekaram
- Rama Prabha as Venkaiamma
- Nirmalamma as Lachamma
- Mukkamala as Collector
- Sukumari as Shanta Devi
- P. J. Sarma as P.A.
- Girija as Ramamani
- Chalapathi Rao as Damodaram
- Jagga Rao as Punyalu
- Potti Prasad as Balakrishna
- Modukuri Satyam as Vaikuntham
- K. V. Chalam

== Soundtrack ==
Bangaru Manishi

Film score by K. V. Mahadevan
- Released: 1976
- Recorded: 22:01
- Genre: Soundtrack
- Label: AVM Audio
- Producer: K. V. Mahadevan

K. V. Mahadevan chronology
Magaadu (1976)	Bangaru Manishi (1976)	Maa Daivam (1976)

Music composed by K. V. Mahadevan.

S. No.	Song title	Lyrics	Singers	length
1	"Meluko Venugopala"	C. Narayana Reddy	P. Susheela	3:55
2	"Yekkadikelutundi Desam"	C. Narayana Reddy	S. P. Balasubrahmanyam, P. Susheela	6:15
3	"Idhi Maro Lokam"	Kosaraju	S. Janaki	3:52
4	"Kala Gannaanu"	Dasaradhi	P. Susheela	3:55
5	"Sukkeskora"	Kosaraju	S. P. Balasubrahmanyam	4:04
