= Gruhalakshmi (1967 film) =

- Theatrical release poster
- Directed by: P. S. Ramakrishna Rao
- Written by: D. V. Narasa Raju (story / dialogues)
- Produced by: P. S. Ramakrishna Rao
- Starring: Akkineni Nageswara Rao; Bhanumathi Ramakrishna
- Cinematography: C. Nageswara Rao
- Edited by: B. Hari Narayana
- Music by: S. Rajeswara Rao
- Production company: Bharani Studios
- Distributed by: Navayuga Films
- Release date: 7 April 1967
- Running time: 138 mins
- Country: India
- Language: Telugu

Gruhalakshmi is a 1967 Telugu-language, comedy film, produced and directed by P. S. Ramakrishna Rao under the Bharani Pictures banner. It stars Akkineni Nageswara Rao, Bhanumathi Ramakrishna with music composed by S. Rajeswara Rao. The film was remade as the Tamil movie Anbe Aaruyire (1975) & hamari bahu alka in Hindi.

== Cast ==
- P. Bhanumathi as Lakshmi
- Akkineni Nageswara Rao as Srinivasa Rao / Chitti
- S. V. Ranga Rao as Bhagavatam
- Ramana Reddy as Hotel Manager
- Padmanabham as Vaali
- Allu Ramalingaiah as Mate of Hotel
- Raja Babu as Mate of Hotel
- Raavi Kondala Rao as Mate of Hotel
- Balakrishna
- Dr. Sivaramakrishnaiah as Doctor
- Suryakantam as Bhagavatam's wife
- Rushyendramani as Lakshmi's mother
- Radha Kumari as Mate of Hotel

== Crew ==
- Art: Rajendra Kumar
- Story — Dialogues: D. V. Narasa Raju
- Lyrics: Sri Sri, Samudrala, Dasaradhi, C. Narayana Reddy, Arudra, Kosaraju
- Playback: Ghantasala, M. Balamuralikrishna Bhanumathi Ramakrishna, Madhavapeddi Satyam, P. Nageswara Rao
- Music: S. Rajeswara Rao
- Editing: B. Hari Narayana
- Cinematography: C. Nageswara Rao
- Producer — Director: P. S. Ramakrishna Rao
- Banner: Bharani Pictures
- Release Date: 7 April 1967

== Soundtrack ==
Gruhalakshmi

Film score by S. Rajeswara Rao
- Released: 1967
- Genre: Soundtrack
- Length: 22:46
- Producer: S. Rajeswara Rao

S. Rajeswara Rao chronology
Bhakta Prahlada (1967)	Gruhalakshmi (1967)	Poola Rangadu (1967)

Music composed by S. Rajeswara Rao.

S. No.	Song title	Lyrics	Singers	length
1	"Kannule Nee Kosam"	Arudra	Ghantasala, Bhanumathi Ramakrishna	2:54
2	"Laali Laali Gopala Bala"	Dasaradhi	Bhanumathi Ramakrishna	3:44
3	"Maavaru Sreevaru"	Sri Sri	Bhanumathi Ramakrishna	3:34
4	"Manalo Manake"	C. Narayana Reddy	Ghantasala, Bhanumathi Ramakrishna	3:55
5	"Melukolupu"	Samudrala	Bhanumathi Ramakrishna	4:10
6	"Vinave Priyurala"	Kosaraju	Ghantasala	4:29
