= Anna Thammudu =

Anna Thammudu may refer to:

- Anna Thammudu (1958 film), a Telugu drama film
- Anna Thammudu (1990 film), a Telugu action drama film
