= Edureeta =

- Theatrical release poster
- Directed by: V. Madhusudhana Rao
- Written by: Satyanand (dialogues)
- Screenplay by: V. Madhusudhana Rao
- Story by: Shaktipada Rajguru
- Based on: Amanush (1975)
- Produced by: Sakhamuri Ramachandra Rao
- Starring: N. T. Rama Rao; Vanisri
- Cinematography: V. S. R. Swamy
- Edited by: Kotagiri Gopal Rao; Kotagiri Venkateswara Rao
- Music by: Satyam
- Production company: Indira Movies
- Release date: 22 July 1977
- Running time: 139 minutes
- Country: India
- Language: Telugu

Edureeta (transl. Flowing Against) is a 1977 Indian Telugu-language action drama film directed by V. Madhusudhana Rao. The film stars N. T. Rama Rao and Vanisri, with music composed by Satyam. It is a remake of the Bengali/Hindi film Amanush (1975). The film was released on 22 July 1977.

== Cast ==
- N. T. Rama Rao as Madhu
- Vanisri as Radha
- Jayasudha as Manga
- Jaggayya as Inspector Ananda Rao
- Satyanarayana as Bhushaiah
- Kanta Rao as Dr. Dharmaiah
- Padmanabham as Priest
- Mukkamala as Zamindar
- Ramana Murthy as Engineer Prasada Rao
- Sakshi Ranga Rao as Thoka Anjaneyulu
- Balakrishna as Subbulu
- Sarathi as Abbulu
- Jagga Rao as Jaggu

== Soundtrack ==
Music composed by Satyam.

Song title	Lyrics	Singers	length
"Godaari Varadhallo"	Veturi	S. P. Balasubrahmanyam	3:10
"Ee Radha Chivaraku"	Veturi	P. Susheela	3:17
"Tholisaari Muddivva"	Veturi	S. P. Balasubrahmanyam, P. Susheela	4:23
"Thaagithe Uyyaalaa"	Veturi	S. P. Balasubrahmanyam	3:48
"Balaraju"	Kosaraju	S. P. Balasubrahmanyam, S. Janaki	5:33
"Edureethaku Antham"	Sri Sri	S. P. Balasubrahmanyam	3:51
