= Lakshmi Kataksham =

- Theatrical release poster
- Directed by: B. Vittalacharya
- Written by: Chillara Bhava Narayana Rao (dialogues)
- Screenplay by: B. Vittalacharya
- Story by: H. V. Subba Rao
- Produced by: Pinjala Subba Rao
- Starring: N. T. Rama Rao; K. R. Vijaya
- Cinematography: H. S. Venu
- Edited by: K. Govinda Swamy
- Music by: S. P. Kodandapani
- Production company: P.S.R. Pictures
- Release date: 12 March 1970
- Running time: 138 mins
- Country: India
- Language: Telugu

Lakshmi Kataksham (transl. Grace of Lakshmi) is a 1970 Indian Telugu-language swashbuckler film, produced by Pinjala Subba Rao under the P.S.R. Pictures banner and directed by B. Vittalacharya. It stars N. T. Rama Rao and K. R. Vijaya, with music composed by S. P. Kodandapani.

== Plot ==
The film revolves around the secret hidden treasure Lakshmi Bhandagaram, over which two kingdoms, Srungarapuram & Punardaranagaram, compete for generations. The saint Kodandapani is under hunt for it with his disciples Prachanda, a malicious one, and Vinayadanda, an obedient one. Once, he walks to Mahendra Varma, the king of Srungarapuram, and prophesies that the child in the womb of Queen Chandravati will achieve it. Kodandapani then proceeds to penance.Prachanda, who has covertly observed the first hint attempts but crashes. At that moment, he affirms that the son of Mahendra Varma is the only one eligible. So, he abducts him immediately after his birth & rears him as Kulavardhana, pretending that he is an orphan before Vinayadanda. Years pass, and Prachanda molds Kulavardhana into a generalist and gains insight. Assuming him as futile, Prachanda dumps him by withdrawing his power & memory. Vinayadanda discovers the ruse of Prachanda. To gather clues, he is associated with Hemamalini, the queen of Punardara Nagaram. He clears the man with the Padmarekha lotus line on his palm to win the treasure.

A rover, Kulavardhana, is guarded by a tribal girl, Singari, and they fall in love. Prachanda has acquired the second page of a manuscript, which can only be read by one with the same palm. So, he starts his hunt by defrauding the king & queen of Srungarapuram with a surety for their son. Vinayadanda quickly tries to read the manuscript when Prachanda transforms him into a dog. In this form, he asks Kulavardhana for help, and the two restore to their originality with a bath in holy water. At that point, Vinayadanda declares that Kulavardhana is the lucky charm with the palm and warns him to be beware of Prachanda. Simultaneously, Prachanda forcibly draws Kulavardhana and the two-step into Srungarapuram, where the King & Queen exert an unknown warmth on him. Kulavardhana plays tactically with Prachanda without revealing details in the manuscript.

Meanwhile, Vinayadanda outdoes Prachanda, informing Hemamalini of the status quo. So, she intrudes into Srungaapuram disguised as a maid and falls for Kulavardhana. Kulavardhana enters Punardaranagaram with Hemamalini, Prachanda & Madhura Varma's armies. Prachanda discerns that Hemamalini is traitorous and is about to enforce his witchcraft, but Vinayadanda breaks all his forces, and they are all captured. Here, Hemamalini frees Prachanda & Madhura Varma and holds Kulavardhana as he understands her genuine love and steps toward the treasure. Amid this, Prachanda retrieves his sorcery and seizes Madhura Varma, Chandravati, & Hemamalini. After an adventurous journey, Kulavardhana triumphs over the treasure with the blessings of the goddess Lakshmi and getting the knowledge of his birth. At last, he defeats Prachanda when Kodandapani lands and curses Prachanda to be a snake. Finally, the movie ends happily with Kulavardhana's crowing ceremony.

== Cast ==
- N. T. Rama Rao as Kulavardhanudu
- K. R. Vijaya as Rani Hemamalini
- Rajasree as Singari
- Satyanarayana as Prachandudu
- Prabhakar Reddy as Mahendra Varma
- M. Balayya as Vinayadandudu
- Mikkilineni as Sage Kodandapaneeswara
- Balakrishna as Madhupriya's husband
- Hemalatha as Chandravathi
- Jyothi Lakshmi as Dancer in "Andala Bommanu Nenu" song

== Soundtrack ==
Lakshmi Kataksham

Film score by S. P. Kodandapani
- Released: 1970
- Genre: Soundtrack
- Label: SAREGAMA Audio
- Producer: S. P. Kodandapani

Music composed by S. P. Kodandapani.

S. No	Song title	Lyrics	Singers	length
1	"Ponna Chettu Maatuna"	C. Narayana Reddy	S. Janaki	4:22
2	"Kilakila Bullammo"	Kosaraju	Ghantasala, S. Janaki	4:02
3	"Ammammamaayo Telisindile"	C. Narayana Reddy	Ghantasala, P. Susheela	3:05
4	"Ra Ra Vennela Dora"	C. Narayana Reddy	Ghantasala, P. Susheela	3:44
5	"Naa Vayasu Sumagandham"	Chellara Bhavanarayana Rao	P. Susheela, Vijayalakshmi	3:39
6	"Swagatham Swagatham"	Chellara Bhavanarayana Rao	S. Janaki, P. Leela	4:33
7	"Andala Bommanu Nenu"	Viswa Prasad	L. R. Eswari	4:17
8	"Dhanyosmi Dhanyosmi"	Chellara Bhavanarayana Rao	Ghantasala	
9	"Sukravarapu Poddu Sirini"	Chillara Bhavanarayana Rao	S. Janaki	1:08
10	"Jaya Jaya Mahalakshmi"	Chillara Bhavanarayana Rao	Chorus	
11	"Gata Suvignana"	Chillara Bhavanarayana Rao	Ghantasala, S. Janaki	
12	"Naadu Gurudevu Karyarthinavuchu"	Chillara Bhavanarayana Rao	Ghantasala	
13	"Sakala Vidyamayee"	Chillara Bhavanarayana Rao	Ghantasala	
