= Padandi Munduku =

- Theatrical release poster
- Directed by: V. Madhusudhana Rao
- Written by: P. Chengaiah; Kongara Jagayya; Ramesh Saigal
- Screenplay by: P. Chengaiah
- Produced by: Jaggayya; T. Krishna Murthy
- Starring: Jaggayya; Gummadi; Jamuna; Kanta Rao; S. V. Ranga Rao; G. Varalakshmi
- Narrated by: Kongara Jaggayya
- Cinematography: J. Sathya Narayana
- Edited by: Akkineni Sanjeevi
- Music by: S. P. Kodandapani
- Production company: Saradhi Studios
- Distributed by: Jagruthi Chithra
- Release date: January 26, 1962
- Country: India
- Language: Telugu

Padandi Munduku: The Dandi March is a 1962 Telugu-language political thriller film directed by V. Madhusudhana Rao, and produced by Jaggayya. The film is touted to be the first Indian film based on the Salt March and India's independence movement as its core theme.

The ensemble cast film featured Kongara Jagayya, Jamuna, Gummadi, Ramana Reddy, Kanta Rao, G. Varalakshmi, K. V. S. Sarma, Hemalatha, Master Suresh and Krishna Ghattamaneni in his debut, V. Nagayya, S. V. Ranga Rao, C. S. R. Anjaneyulu, Balakrishna, Peketi, Kamala Kumari, Jayanthi, and Rajasulochana in pivotal roles, while Indian wrestlers Ajith Singh and Sethi were also featured in guest roles.

The film received critical reception at the International Film Festival of India, the Tashkent Film Festival, and the 5th Moscow International Film Festival, including special mention from Russian Jury member Alexander Rou.

== Plot ==
During 1920, the time of British Raj in Madras State a train accident separates freedom fighter couple Santhamma (G. Varalakshmi) and husband Dharmarao (K. V. S. Sarma). However, Santhamma survives and brings up her son Sathyadev (Jaggaiah) and adopts another son Arjun (Master Suresh), and inculcates in them Gandhi's principles. Arjun participates in the 1930 Salt Satyagraha, kills a British officer, and flies the Indian tricolor flag. On the other hand, DSP Sankara Rao (Gummadi), the brother of Santhamma, working under the British administration, summons Santhamma for the act, and her son Arjun is imprisoned.

However, with the help of Sankara Rao's daughter Sarala (Jamuna) and her follower Vinayak (Ramana Reddy), Sathyadev rescues Arjun from a hospital where he is being treated. Dharmarao brings the grievously injured Sathyadev and Arjun home. However, his second wife's son Suresh (Kantha Rao) drives them to Sankara Rao's house instead of the doctor's home. Sarala manages to free them from the home. Having identified themselves as vigilantes to Rao's wife, Sathyadev and Arjun take shelter at Rao's house without his knowledge, Rao's wife Parvathi (Hemalatha) realizes that Arjun is their lost child. When an unnerved Rao and a British official try to take them into custody, Sathyadev and Arjun kill the corrupt British officer. In the ensuing chase and shootout, Santhamma, who comes in between, succumbs to bullet injuries and dies. A repentant Rao resigns his job opposing the British raj's atrocities towards Indians and protests, with India attaining independence, Sathyadev and Arjun are released from the prison.

== Cast ==
- Jaggayya as Sathyadev
- Gummadi as DSP Sankara Rao
- Jamuna as Sarala
- Kanta Rao as Suresh
- S. V. Ranga Rao
- G. Varalakshmi as Santhamma
- K. V. S. Sarma as Dharmarao
- Hemalatha as Parvathi
- Master Suresh as Arjun

== Production ==
V. Madhusudhana Rao helmed the production design for the film. The soundtrack and background score was composed by S. P. Kodandapani. The talkie part of the film was shot at Saradhi Studios, in Hyderabad, and crucial scenes were shot in Tenali in Andhra Pradesh with few retrospective scenes showcasing Gandhiji and Jawaharlal Nehru. The film was released during the republic day weekend of January 26, 1962, to positive reviews.

== Soundtrack ==
- "Padandi Munduku Padandi Tosuku" (Lyrics: Sri Sri; Singers: Ghantasala, Madhavapeddi Satyam, A. P. Komala)
- "Manasu Manchidi Vayasu Cheddadi" (Lyrics: Aathreya; Singers: Ghantasala, P. Susheela)
- "Meluko Saagipo Bandhanalu Tenchuko" (Lyrics: Dasarathi; Singers: Ghantasala, Madhavapeddi Satyam, A. P. Komala)
