= Aggi Pidugu =

1964 film

- Theatrical release poster
- Directed by: B. Vittalacharya
- Written by: G. K. Murthy (dialogues)
- Screenplay by: B. Vittalacharya
- Story by: B. Vittalacharya
- Based on: The Corsican Brothers by Alexandre Dumas
- Produced by: B. Vittalacharya
- Starring: N. T. Rama Rao; Krishna Kumari; Rajasree
- Cinematography: Ravikant Nagaich
- Edited by: K. Govinda Swamy; A. Mohan
- Music by: Rajan–Nagendra
- Production company: Sri Vital Combines
- Release date: 31 July 1964
- Running time: 124 minutes
- Country: India
- Language: Telugu

Aggi Pidugu (transl. Fire and Thunder) is a 1964 Indian Telugu-language swashbuckler film produced and directed by B. Vittalacharya. It stars N. T. Rama Rao, Krishna Kumari and Rajasree, with music composed by Rajan–Nagendra. The film is based on the 1844 French novella The Corsican Brothers, written by Alexandre Dumas. The film was dubbed into Tamil with the title Veeraadhi Veeran and released in the same year.

== Plot ==
The film revolves around the twin brothers, Raja and Madhav, who are born to King Mahendra and his Queen in a prosperous kingdom. Mahendra’s younger brother, Veerendra, hopes to inherit the throne, as Mahendra is childless. However, Veerendra’s aspirations are shattered when the Queen gives birth to conjoined twins. Though initially feared they would not survive, a British doctor employed by the royal family successfully separates the twins through surgery. The boys are named Raja and Madhav.

During the twins' naming ceremony, Veerendra, motivated by greed, murders King Mahendra and the Queen in an attempt to seize the throne. He then tries to kill the infant twins, but Mahendra’s loyal servant, Veerayya, along with the British doctor, manages to hide the children. Veerendra, unable to find the twins, sets the palace on fire, believing that they are still inside. Veerayya and the Doctor, now resolved to protect the royal bloodline, take responsibility for raising the twins. Veerayya takes Raja to live in the forest, while the Doctor takes Madhav with him, ensuring that the boys live apart to avoid suspicion.

Years later, the bond between the brothers remains strong despite their separation. Raja grows up in the forest and falls in love with a village girl named Roja, while Madhav, raised in a modern environment, adopts contemporary habits and falls for Malathi. Meanwhile, Veerendra has usurped the throne and rules tyrannically. One day, Raja learns that Veerendra’s soldiers have tormented the villagers. In a fit of rage, he storms the royal court, defeats Veerendra’s men, and frees the villagers. Shocked by the young man's audacity, Veerendra begins to suspect the identity of this mysterious figure.

Fearful that Veerendra may have recognized Raja, Veerayya decides it is time for the brothers to reunite. Along with the Doctor, he arranges for Raja and Madhav to meet at their parents' graves. The brothers embrace and vow to reclaim their rightful throne. Raja immediately seeks to kill Veerendra, but Madhav intervenes, urging a peaceful resolution. However, Veerendra’s right-hand man, Vedanda, throws a knife at Raja, injuring him. Maddened by the attack, Madhav retaliates, and the brothers retreat from the scene.

Baffled by the twins' survival, Veerendra sends Vedanda to track them down. Meanwhile, Madhav and the Doctor are tending to Raja’s wounds when Vedanda and his men stumble upon them. Madhav defends himself and the Doctor, driving the attackers away. Veerendra grows suspicious of the Doctor’s activities, suspecting him of treason. He decides to visit the Doctor’s home, where he encounters Malathi, who is visiting Madhav. Veerendra becomes infatuated with her and decides to marry her, learning that she is the daughter of his staff member Rangaraju.

When Malathi rejects his advances, Veerendra places her family under house arrest. Madhav, disguised, sneaks into the house and rescues Malathi, bringing her to Veerayya for safety. Veerendra soon learns of the deception and sends his soldiers to capture Malathi. Raja, upon meeting Malathi for the first time, is struck by her beauty and attempts to woo her. Veerayya scolds him, revealing that she is Madhav’s fiancée. Filled with guilt, Raja seeks out the Doctor, asking for poison. The Doctor calms him by explaining the unique bond between the brothers and reminding him of their duty to reclaim their kingdom.

Meanwhile, Vedanda captures Malathi and takes her to Veerendra. Madhav, unaware of her capture, suspects his brother and confronts him. However, Roja intervenes and informs them that Malathi had escaped. Madhav sets out to rescue her. Veerendra prepares to marry Malathi and also imprisons the Doctor and Veerayya. Disguised as a diamond merchant, Madhav infiltrates Veerendra’s court and gains his trust. At the wedding ceremony, Madhav snatches the wedding chain from Veerendra and frees Malathi. Enraged, Veerendra arrests Madhav and beats him. Raja arrives to rescue his brother, and together they defeat Veerendra.

The film concludes with the weddings of Madhav and Malathi, and Raja and Roja, restoring peace to the kingdom.

== Cast ==
- N. T. Rama Rao as Raja & Madhav (dual role)
- Krishna Kumari as Malathi
- Rajasree as Roja
- Rajanala as Veerendrudu
- V. Nagayya as Veeraiah
- Satyanarayana as Vedanda
- Mukkamala as Doctor
- Balakrishna
- Maduukuri Satyam
- Jayanthi
- Brundavana Chowdary

== Music ==
Aggi Pidugu

Film score by Rajan–Nagendra
- Released: 1964
- Genre: Soundtrack
- Label: AVM Audio
- Producer: Rajan–Nagendra

Music was composed by Rajan–Nagendra. The song Emo Emo Idhi is a blockbuster. Audio soundtrack was released by AVM Audio Company.

S. No.	Song title	Lyrics	Singers	length
1	"Thappantaavaa"	C. Narayana Reddy	S. Janaki	3:30
2	"Emo Emo Idhi"	C. Narayana Reddy	Ghantasala, S. Janaki	3:47
3	"Kannu Kannu Chaera"	G. K. Murthy	S. Janaki	2:55
4	"Laddu Laddu"	G. K. Murthy	Ghantasala, S. Janaki	3:26
5	"Evaranukunnaave"	C. Narayana Reddy	P. Susheela, S. Janaki	4:09
6	"Nene Nene"	C. Narayana Reddy	L. R. Eswari	3:48
