= Kaliyuga Ramudu =

- Movie Poster
- Directed by: K. Bapaiah
- Written by: Acharya Aatreya (dialogues)
- Screenplay by: K. Bapaiah
- Story by: Charandas Shokh
- Produced by: D. Srirangaraju
- Starring: N. T. Rama Rao; Rati Agnihotri
- Cinematography: Nandamuri Mohana Krishna
- Edited by: Kotagiri Gopala Rao
- Music by: K. V. Mahadevan
- Production company: Tirupati Productions
- Release date: 13 March 1982
- Running time: 126 minutes
- Country: India
- Language: Telugu

Kaliyuga Ramudu is a 1982 Indian Telugu-language action film, produced by D. Srirangaraju under the Tirupati Productions banner and directed by K. Bapaiah. It stars N. T. Rama Rao (NTR), Rati Agnihotri and music composed by K. V. Mahadevan.

== Plot ==
Ramu (NTR) is a CBI officer who comes to investigate a case. Sandhya (Rati Agnihotri) is a daughter of a scientist who invents a formula. Ranjeet (Satyanarayana) kidnaps the scientist and blackmails Sandhya, thereafter uses Sandhya for his own needs, sending her to gather information about Ramu. Ranjeet also marries Ramu's sister to protect himself from Ramu. During this process, Ramu and Sandhya fall in love and Ramu learn the truth about Sandhya.

== Cast ==
- N. T. Rama Rao as Ramu
- Rati Agnihotri as Sandhya
- Satyanarayana as Ranjeeth
- Jaggayya as G. D. Sastry
- Prabhakar Reddy as Billa
- Allu Ramalingaiah as Allu Kumar
- Kanta Rao as Peter
- Mikkilineni as CBI Official
- Mukkamala as CBI Official
- P. J. Sarma as CBI Official
- Anand Mohan as Ballu
- Bheema Raju as Bhillu
- Chalapathi Rao as CBI Official
- Sudhakar as Tony
- Sarathi
- Jagga Rao as Michael
- S. Varalakshmi as Jayamma & Suramma (dual role)
- Kavitha as Savitri
- Jayamalini as item number
- Malika as Rosy
- Jaya Vijaya as Subbalakshmi
- Nirmalamma as Bamma
- Vijaya Ranga Raju as Goon

== Soundtrack ==
Kaliyuga Ramudu

Film score by K. V. Mahadevan
- Released: 1982
- Genre: Soundtrack
- Length: 20:11
- Label: AVM Audio
- Producer: K. V. Mahadevan

K. V. Mahadevan chronology
Bhale Kapuram (1982)	Kaliyuga Ramudu (1982)	Subhalekha (1982)

Music composed by K. V. Mahadevan. Lyrics were written by Acharya Aatreya. Music released by AVM Audio Company.

S.No	Song title	Singers	length
1	"Aanando Brahma"	S. P. Balasubrahmanyam, P. Susheela	3:31
2	"Nee Buggameeda"	S. P. Balasubrahmanyam, P. Susheela	3:22
3	"Seetiki Maatiki"	S. P. Balasubrahmanyam, P. Susheela	3:24
4	"Diyyoro Diyyoro"	S. P. Balasubrahmanyam	3:14
5	"Hallaa Gullaa"	S. P. Balasubrahmanyam, P. Susheela	3:24
6	"Ori Nayano"	P. Susheela	3:16
