= Golconda Abbulu =

Golconda Abbulu is a 1982 Telugu drama film directed by Dasari Narayana Rao and produced by Kumarjee. The film stars Krishnam Raju and Jaya Prada in the lead roles. The music was composed by K. V. Mahadevan.

The story of this film is about a villain who becomes a challenge to the police by committing crimes without evidence and avoiding detection, until a rowdy stops him and brings him to justice.

== Cast ==
- Krishnam Raju as Ramu aka Golconda Abbulu
- Jaya Prada
- Kaikala Satyanarayana as Satyam
- Rao Gopala Rao as Mayor JB
- Allu Rama Lingaiah as Chandramouli
- Kantha Rao
- Mukkamala
- Nirmalamma
- Prabhakar Reddy
- Chalapathi Rao
- Mikkilineni
- Manjula
- Master Haja Sheriff
