= Bhimanjaneya Yuddham =

1966 Indian epic fantasy film

- Bhimanjaneya Yuddham poster
- Directed by: S. D. Lal
- Written by: Thandra Subrahmanyam
- Story by: Thandra Subrahmanyam
- Based on: The Mahabharata
- Produced by: T. Ramakoteswara Rao
- Starring: Kanta Rao; Rajasree; Dandamudi Rajagopal; Kamineni Eswar Rao
- Edited by: Govind Dinakar Joshi, B.S. Mani
- Music by: T.V. Raju
- Production company: Mahalakshmi Movies
- Release date: 29 April 1966
- Running time: 2 hr 14 min
- Country: India
- Language: Telugu

Bhimanjaneya Yuddham (transl. The war between Bhima and Anjaneya) is a 1966 Indian mythological film directed by S. D. Lal. It was produced by T. Ramakoteswara Rao under the banner Mahalakshmi Movies. The film was shot in Telugu. The story is an adaptation of a small tale from Mahabharata where Bheema meets Anjaneya. Their conversation turns into a war.

== Plot ==
In Treta Yuga, Anjaneya is supposed to be Vayu's son, while Bhima is Vayu's son in Dvapara Yuga. According to the epic Ramayana, Anjaneya is supposed to be immortal and devotee of Rama. According to Mahabharata, Bhima is strong and top in valour of his times. The plot of this movie runs around what happens when these two strong men head to war.

Sougandhika flowers are supposed to bloom and seen only at sunrise. Kubera uses these flowers to worship Lord Siva. Nalakoobara, Kubera's son, is fond of Soudamini, while Rambha loves him. To solve the problem, Narada calls for a dance competition between the two. When Soudamini wins, she is gifted one Sougandhika flower. Nalakoobara proposes Soudamini and tells the gifted flower is the symbol of their love and puts it into her hair. Kubera, realising that one flower is less in worship and that the flower is adorned in Soudamini's head, orders for her banishment. Rambha, taking advantage of the situation, throws Soudamini into river Ganga.

The flower in her head is washed away and is received by Droupadi while Soudamini reaches Anjaneya's hermitage. Droupadi asks Bhima to get more such flowers. Bhima gets them from Gandharva world with the help of Manimantha. On returning, Bhima is encountered by Anjaneya and in turn, Soudamini mistakes Bhima to have stolen the flowers. Anjaneya gives flowers to Soudamini and asks her to return to her world. While he fights Bhima. Soudamini reaches Gandharva world and is cursed by Kubera to be deformed into ugly one.

Ghatotkacha, son of Bhima, comes to rescue Bhima and a massive war occurs between Bhima and Anjaneya. With his magical powers, Ghatotkacha tries to cheat Anjaneya turning himself into Lord Sri Rama. Anjaneya believes that Rama came and releases Bhima from his Tail lock. Knowing the truth, Anjaneya gets angry and shows his Viswaroopam. Again the war continues and the universe shakes because of this causing cyclones, volcanoes etc.

Finally, Narada muni tells Kubera to take back his curse and turn Saudamini to normal, to give Sougandhika flowers to Bhima and with blessings of Anjaneya, do the marriage of Nalakoobara and Soudamini. On the other hand, Anjaneya and Bhima get to know that both Lord Sri Rama and Lord Sri Krishna are same. Rest of the story is about how Lord Krishna comes to the rescue and stops the war.

== Cast ==
- Kantharao as Nalakoobara
- Rajasri as Soudamini
- Dandamudi Rajagopal as Bheema
- Kamineni Eswar Rao as Anjaneya
- Ramana Reddy
- Chalam as Narada
- Kaikala Satyanarayana as Ghatotkacha
- Mukkamala as Kubera
- Vijayasri
- S. Varalakshmi as Draupadi
- Veenavathi
- Haranath as Krishna and Rama
- Vijayalalitha

== Crew ==
- Director: S.D. Lal
- Producer: T. Rama Koteswara Rao
- Cinematographer: U. K. Ramachandra
- Editor: Govind Dinakar Joshi, B.S. Mani
- Composer: T. V. Raju
- Lyricist: C. Narayana Reddy, Thandra Subramanyam, Arudra, Rajasri
- Presented By: Donepudi Krishna Murthy
- Executive Producer: Donepudi Krishna Murthy
- Story: Thandra Subramanyam
- Dialogue: Thandra Subramanyam
- Singer: Ghantasala Venkateswara Rao, P. Susheela, L.R. Eswari, R. Sarojini, Venkatrao, Madhavapedhi Satyam, P. Sriram
- Art Director: Kudaravalli Nageswara Rao
- Dance Director: Chinni-Sampath

== Soundtrack ==
Bheemanjaneya Yuddham

Film score by T. V. Raju
- Released: 1966
- Genre: Soundtrack
- Length: 31 min 39 sec
- Producer: T. V. Raju

Music was composed by T. V. Raju. Lyrics were written by C. Narayana Reddy, Thandra Subramanyam, Arudra and Rajasree.

S. No.	Song title	Singers	Length	Lyrics
1	"Itu Itu O Raja"	L. R. Eswari	04:04	C. Narayana Reddy
2	"Naa Kalalanni Phaliyinche"	P. Susheela	02:42	C. Narayana Reddy
3	"Kali Chitta Saroja"	Venkatarao	01:10	Tandra Subrahmanyam
4	"Jaya Jaya Janaki Rama"	Ghantasala	03:29	Rajasree
5	"Nene Nene Madhugeeti"	L. R. Eswari, Susheela	03:03	Arudra
6	"Palike Ragam Piliche Bhavam"	L.R. Eswari	03:36	C. Narayana Reddy
7	"Rama Raghukula Soma"	Ghantasala	03:18	Tandra Subrahmanyam
8	"Veerudane Virisina Sougandhika"	P. Sriram	02:31	Rajasree
9	"Sigalona Virisina"	Ghantasala, Susheela	03:54	C. Narayana Reddy
10	"Surabhamini Saudamini"	Ghantasala	03:52	C. Narayana Reddy
