= Prameelarjuneeyam =

- Theatrical release poster
- Directed by: M. Mallikarjuna Rao
- Screenplay by: M. Mallikarjuna Rao
- Story by: Pingali Nagendra Rao
- Produced by: Kandimalla Adi Babu; K. Nagumani
- Starring: N. T. Rama Rao; B. Saroja Devi
- Cinematography: Ravikant Nagaich; Rehaman
- Edited by: N. S. Prakasam
- Music by: Pendyala Nageswara Rao
- Production company: S.R. Movies
- Release date: 11 June 1965
- Running time: 162 minutes
- Country: India
- Language: Telugu

Prameelarjuneeyam is a 1965 Telugu-language Hindu mythological film directed by M. Mallikarjuna Rao. It stars N. T. Rama Rao, B. Saroja Devi with music composed by Pendyala Nageswara Rao. It was produced by K. Adi Babu and K. Nagumani under the S.R. Movies banner.

== Cast ==
- N. T. Rama Rao as Arjuna
- B. Saroja Devi as Prameela
- Kanta Rao as Lord Krishna
- Sobhan Babu as Vrushaketu
- Relangi as Ghaku
- Padmanabham as Narada Maharshi
- Mikkilineni as Dharmaraja
- Balakrishna as Vrushaketu's friend
- Vanisri as Gambiram
- Chandrakala
- Rajasree as Kittamma
- Girija as Maha Maaya
- Rushyendramani as Bhagavathi
- Chayadevi as Ranachandi
- Suryakala
- Athili Lakshmi as Adi Parasakthi

== Soundtrack ==
Prameelarjuneeyam

Film score by Pendyala Nageswara Rao
- Released: 1965
- Genre: Soundtrack
- Label: AVM Audio
- Producer: Pendyala Nageswara Rao

Music composed by Pendyala Nageswara Rao. Lyrics were written by Pingali Nagendra Rao. Music released by AVM Audio Company.

S. No.	Song title	Singers	length
1	"Sarva Mangala"	Ghantasala	0:47
2	"Beebhatsa Birudammu"	Ghantasala	1:18
3	"Bavaa Kothhagaa"	Ghantasala	1:02
4	"Jayahe Aadi Shakthi"	P. Susheela	3:14
5	"Oho Manogjnya Sundaree"	Ghantasala	2:51
6	"Dharani Samstha Rajkula"	P. Leela	0:42
7	"Purushulandune Veerulu"	P. Leela	0:24
8	"Ghana Kurukshetra"	Madhavapeddi Satyam, P. Leela	1:36
9	"Cheppandi Chuddam"	Madhavapeddi Satyam, Pithapuram, Swarnalatha	2:36
10	"Sari Kotta Kannenoyi"	P. Susheela	3:06
11	"Bhama Bhamakoka"	Madhavapeddi Satyam, Swarnalatha	1:25
12	"Jajiri Jajiri"	K. Jamuna Rani	3:33
13	"Ninu Nee Siggule"	Ghantasala	1:10
14	"Ninu Choosi Chudgane"	P. Susheela	3:43
15	"Pranaya"	Ghantasala	1:06
16	"Ghana Devvasurala"	Ghatasala	1:26
17	"Akhila Sangrama"	P. Leela	0:33
