= Anna Thammudu (1958 film) =

1958 film

- Theatrical release poster
- Directed by: C. S. Rao
- Written by: Pinishetty (dialogues)
- Produced by: Kadaru Venkateswara Rao
- Starring: N. T. Rama Rao; Sowcar Janaki; Jaggayya
- Cinematography: Shanmugam
- Edited by: Umanath
- Music by: Ashwatthama
- Production company: Sri Raja Rajeswari Film Company
- Release date: 15 February 1958
- Running time: 153 minutes
- Country: India
- Language: Telugu

Anna Thammudu (transl. Elder Brother and Younger Brother) is a 1958 Telugu-language drama film, produced by Kadaru Venkateswara Rao under the Sri Raja Rajeswari Film Company banner and directed by C. S. Rao. It stars N. T. Rama Rao, Jaggayya, Sowcar Janaki and music composed by Ashwatthama.

== Plot ==
Nageswara Rao loathes his brother for sentencing him to prison in the past. He sneaks in his girlfriend Vajram and associate Brahmandam into the house. Upon knowing Shantamma is pregnant, he ploys to slay her and Ravi to eliminate heirs to Madhava Rao's property.

Padma jumps from the balcony to save herself, resulting in her death. Padmas divulges the fact to Ravi. Ravi intrudes into Nageswara Rao's house and attempts to kill him. During the fight, Nageswara Rao accidentally kills Vajram and incriminates Ravi in the murder. After being arrested, Ravi escapes from prison and hides from the police.

Nageswara Rao lusts after Rani and ruses to splice her by trying to strike a deal with Purushottama Rao to give his daughter's hand in marriage. However, Rajendra saves his honor and Purushottama Rao performs Rani's marriage with Rajendra upon realizing their love affair. Ravi returns and tries to kill Nageswara Rao again but flees when the police arrive. The police shoot him, and he lands at Rajendra's residence, where Shantamma saves him from the police and thus frustrates Rajendra. Nageswara Rao lures Rani to his house under the pretense of Rajendra being ill, but Ravi comes to her rescue. Ranganna arrives at the same time and tries to kill Nageswara Rao; when Ranganna is injured, Ravi finally kills Nageswara Rao. Ranganna discloses that Ravi is Shantamma's elder son, and they reunite, after which Ravi is arrested.

== Cast ==
- N. T. Rama Rao as Ravi
- Sowcar Janaki as Rani
- Jaggayya as Rajendra
- Relangi as Uppalanaiadu
- R. Nageswara Rao as Inspector
- Mikkilineni as Purushothama Rao
- Mukkamala as Nageswara Rao
- Chadalavada as Brahmandam
- Padmanabham as Cook
- K. V. S. Sarma as Father Joseph
- A. V. Subba Rao as Madhava Rao
- Rajasulochana as Vajram
- Girija as Padma
- Malathi as Shantamma
- Ch. Prabhavathi as Kamakshi
- Kamala as Chenchulakshmi
- Nalla Ramamurthy

== Soundtrack ==
Anna Thammudu

Film score by G. Ashwatthama
- Released: 1958
- Genre: Soundtrack
- Producer: G. Ashwatthama

Music composed by G. Ashwatthama. Music released on Audio Company.

S. No.	Song title	Singers	Lyrics	length (mm:ss)
1	"Ayyo Paapam"	Madhavapeddi Satyam	Daita Gopalam	04:48
2	"Tvarapadaoi Naa Raajaa"	P. Susheela	Daita Gopalam	03:08
3	"Anukunadanta"	S. Janaki	Samudrala Jr.	02:32
2	"Vayasumallina Vanneladi"	Pitapuram Nageshwara Rao & Ghantasala	Ravuri Bharadhwaja	02:37
5	"Chinnaari Chetula"	P. B. Sreenivas & K. Rani	Daita Gopalam	03:32
6	"Mroginpave Hrudayaveena"	Jikki	Acharya	03:45
7	"Randi Randi"	Ghantasala	Kosaraju Raghavaiah	03:23
8	"Okka Rakthame....Ayyo Paapam" (Bit)	Madhavapeddi Satyam	Daita Gopalam	
9	"Kroora Janmake....Ayyo Paapam" (Bit)	Madhavapeddi Satyam	Daita Gopalam	
10	"Chenchulakshmi (Drama)"	T. R. Tilak, Nalla Rammurthy & Madhavapeddi Satyam	Daita Gopalam	05:49
11	"Tanayudanuchu Aa Thalli.... Ayyo Paapam" (Bit)	Madhavapeddi Satyam	Daita Gopalam	
12	"Ragulutundi Ragulutundi"	Madhavapeddi Satyam & K. Jamuna Rani	Kosaraju	
