= Jwaladweepa Rahasyam =

- Directed by: B. Vittalacharya
- Written by: G. Krishna Murthy (Dialogues)
- Screenplay by: B. Vittalacharya
- Produced by: P. Mallikharjuna Rao
- Starring: Kanta Rao; Rajanala; Mukkamala; Krishna Kumari
- Cinematography: S. Venkataratnam
- Edited by: B. Kandaswamy
- Music by: S. P. Kodandapani
- Production companies: Madhu Pictures, Madras
- Distributed by: Navayuga Vidudhala (Andhra Pradesh); Kalpana Movies (Mysore)
- Release date: 8 June 1965
- Running time: 198 minutes
- Country: India
- Language: Telugu

Jwaladweepa Rahasyam (transl. The Secret of the Volcanic Island) is a 1965 Telugu-language fantasy film directed by B. Vittalacharya. The film was produced under the banner Madhu Pictures by P. Mallikharjuna Rao. It stars Kanta Rao, Krishna Kumari, Mukkamala and Rajanala.

== Plot ==
Siddhendra Bhattaraka (Mukkamala) is a sage who aims to get immortal powers by practising black magic and by offering three young babies everyday to Black Magic Goddess. King Prabhakara Varma (K. V. S. Sarma), who is furious with Siddhendra's acts even after repeated warnings, orders Siddhendra to be exiled from the kingdom of Tejovathi. While being sent out to a forest, Siddhendra tries to escape and he loses his big toe when he is shot with an arrow by one of the King's soldiers. He hides behind a rock and misguides the soldiers by dropping his big toe in another route.

While walking through the forest, he hears a woman screaming and being attacked by a giant vulture. He fights with the vulture and kills it. The woman he saved is a witch called Sarpakesi and the vulture that tried to kill her is a warlock. Sarpakesi is impressed and grants him a boon. She builds a volcano (Jwala Dweepa) for Siddhendra and arranges a secret place inside it for him to perform all rituals in order to achieve immortal powers. She also snatches three small babies every day from the citizens of the kingdom through her black magic and brings them to Siddhendra for Goddess offerings.

One day Black Magic Goddess appears and tells Siddhendra that he can never achieve immortal powers in spite of all these offerings as he is considered handicapped due to losing his big toe. With the help of Sarpakesi, Siddhendra drowns the boat of king's army coming to attack him. Sarpakesi recommends Siddhendra to accept one of the servants of the King Prabhakara Varma, Bhallataka Varma (Rajanala) as his disciple and train him to achieve the goal. Bhallataka joins hands with Siddhendra and they conduct worship for five years to Snake God to gain immortal powers. Finally, Snake God blesses Bhallataka with immortal powers with one condition that his hands should never be filled with blood, meaning he can't kill anyone.

Bhallataka overtakes the kingdom of Prabhakara Varma and gets the King, the Queen and their four sons imprisoned in the volcano under the control of Sarpakesi. One of the servants manages to escape with the King's fifth son, Anand Varma (Kanta Rao) without Bhallataka's knowledge. Siddhendra creates an immortal girl called Lalasa and gets her married to Bhallataka. In an inauspicious moment, Lalasa gives birth to a baby girl, Aravinda (Krishna Kumari). Fed up with the atrocities, the chief priest curses Bhallataka that his own son-in-law will be killing Bhallataka. Bhallataka first thinks of killing his daughter, but couldn't because he will lose his powers. So, he decides not to get his daughter married. The chief priest is imprisoned and tortured by Sarpakesi. Bhallataka passes a rule that every citizen in the kingdom should worship him as the only God and should remove any idols or pictures of other gods from temples and houses. People like Kanteerava, who opposed this rule are harassed and jailed. The servant who raised Anand reveals the secret that Anand is the son of the King Prabhakara Varma and explains all the crimes of Bhallataka. Anand comes to the Tejovathi kingdom and is jailed for opposing Bhallataka's views by the commander Dalapathi (Kaikala Satya Narayana). Anand, through a small hole in the jail happens to see the princess Aravinda singing and falls for her. Both exchange words and Aravinda also falls for Anand.

The rest of the story is all about how Anand married Aravinda and released his family from the volcano (Jwala Dweepa) by killing Bhallataka and Siddhendra.

== Cast ==
Male actors

- Kanta Rao as Anand Varma
- Rajanala as Bhallataka Varma
- Mukkamala as Siddhendra Bhattaraka
- Balakrishna
- K. V. S. Sarma as King Prabhakara Varma
- Kaikala Satya Narayana as Dalapathi
- Pehalwan Kantha Rao as Kanteerava
- Viswanadham
- Sarma
- Raghuram
- Krishnayya
- Kasinath
- Ramaraju
- Bheemaraju
- Kalappa
- Rajarao
- Pasha
- Sasi

Female actors

- Krishna Kumari as Aravinda
- Suryakala as Lalasa
- Saraswathi
- Meena Kumari
- Lakshmi Kanthamma
- Vijaya
- Brindavana Chowdhary
- Junior Janaki
