= Guruvunu Minchina Sishyudu =

- గురువును మించిన శిష్యుడు
- Directed by: B. Vittalacharya
- Produced by: B. Vittalacharya
- Starring: Kantha Rao; Mukkamala; Krishna Kumari; Rajanala; Kaikala Satyanarayana; Valluri Balakrishna
- Edited by: A. Mohan
- Music by: S. P. Kodandapani
- Production company: Vithal Productions
- Release date: 1963
- Country: India
- Language: Telugu

Guruvunu Minchina Sishyudu is 1963 Indian Telugu-language fantasy film directed and produced by B. Vittalacharya starring Kantha Rao, Krishna Kumari, Kaikala Satyanarayana, Valluri Balakrishna in the lead roles.

== Cast ==
- Kantha Rao as Vijeya
- Mukkamala as Kalaketu
- Krishna Kumari as Padmavathi
- Rajanala as Keertisena
- Kaikala Satyanarayana as Dharmapala
- Valluri Balakrishna as Ajeya

== Production ==
This film marked the first credited role of Editor Mohan.
