= Pavitra Bandham (1971 film) =

- Theatrical release poster
- Directed by: V. Madhusudhana Rao
- Written by: Aarudhra (dialogues)
- Screenplay by: V. Madhusudhana Rao
- Produced by: T. Govindarajan
- Starring: Akkineni Nageswara Rao; Kanchana; Vanisri; Krishnam Raju
- Cinematography: K. S. Ramakrishna Rao
- Edited by: K. Satyam
- Music by: S. Rajeswara Rao
- Production companies: Venus Pictures; Ashok Movies
- Release date: 24 February 1971
- Running time: 168 minutes
- Country: India
- Language: Telugu

Pavitra Bandham (transl. Divine relation) is a 1971 Indian Telugu-language drama film, produced by T. Govindarajan and directed by V. Madhusudhana Rao. It stars Akkineni Nageswara Rao, Kanchana, Vanisri and Krishnam Raju, with music composed by S. Rajeswara Rao.

== Cast ==
- Akkineni Nageswara Rao as Ashok / Raja
- Kanchana as Aruna
- Vanisri as Rani
- Krishnam Raju as Shekar
- V. Nagayya as Doragaru
- Padmanabham as Dasu
- Balakrishna as Kaasulu
- Raavi Kondala Rao
- Dr. Sivaramakrishnaiah
- Perumallu as Subbaiah
- G. Varalakshmi as Durgamma
- Geetanjali as Kanakam
- Jhansi as Lakshmi

== Soundtrack ==
The soundtrack was composed by S. Rajeswara Rao.

Song title	Lyrics	Singers	length
"Gandhi Puttina Desama Idi"	Aarudhra	Ghantasala	3:39
"Pachcha Bottu Cherigi Podule"	Aarudhra	Ghantasala, P. Susheela	4:04
"Chinnari Navvule"	Aarudhra	P. Susheela	3:34
"Fifty/Fifty"	Aarudhra	Ghantasala, P. Susheela	3:44
"Gala Gala Gala Gajjela Bandi"	Aarudhra	P. Susheela, Swarnalata	3:06
"Tantrala Bavayya"	Kosaraju	Pithapuram, Swarnalata	2:41
"Pachcha Bottu" (Sad)	Aarudhra	P. Susheela	3:10
