= Saptaswaralu =

- Directed by: Vedantam Raghavayya
- Produced by: Tadepalli Lakshmi Kanta Rao
- Starring: Tadepalli Lakshmi Kanta Rao; Rajasree
- Music by: T. V. Raju
- Release date: 1969
- Country: India
- Language: Telugu

Saptaswaralu or Sapta Swaralu is a 1969 Telugu-language film directed by Vedantam Raghavayya and produced by famous actor Tadepalli Lakshmi Kanta Rao under the banner Hema Films.

It is a musical hit film with excellent lyrics with music composed by T. V. Raju.

== Plot ==
Devi Saraswathi gave Saraswati Peetham to a Gandharva (a divine musician) and commands him to use its power to spread goodness on Earth. However, a mishap occurs, and the Peetham falls into the Mandakini river. Following the incident, both the Gandharva and his lover are cursed to take human form and be reborn on Earth. In the mortal realm, the reincarnated Gandharva must race against an evil villain who is also desperately hunting for the divine relic. Ultimately, the Gandharva outwits the villain, secures the Peetham, and entrusts it to an honorable, elderly mortal musician to preserve its sanctity and utilize it for the greater good of humanity.

== Cast ==
- Tadepalli Lakshmi Kanta Rao as Saranga
- Rajasree as Jayanthi
- Vijayalalitha as Devamanohari
- V. Nagayya as Vidyanandudu
- Kaikala Satyanarayana as Abheri
- Vijayanirmala as Saraswati
- Rama Krishna as Narada
- Dhulipala
- Rajababu
- Balakrishna

== Soundtrack ==
There are 14 songs and poems. The lyrics are written by C. Narayana Reddy and Veeturi. Music score provided by T. V. Raju.

- "Ade Neevantivi Ade Nevintini Gunde Alalaga Chelarega" (Lyrics: C. Narayana Reddy; Singers: Ghantasala and P. Susheela; Cast: Kanta Rao and Rajasri)
- "Om Namo Vedantavedyala Meghasyamala" (Venkateswara Suprabhatam)
- "Kasturi Tilakam Lalataphalake Vakshasthale Kaustubham" (Srikrishna Karnamrutam) (Singer: Ghantasala; Cast: Kanta Rao)
- "Krishnayya Gadasari Krishnayya Gopemma Sogasari Gopemma" (Lyrics: C. Narayana Reddy; Singers: Ghantasala and P. Susheela; Cast: Kanta Rao and Rajasri)
- "Cham Cham Chammacekka Saisaisai Chakkani Chukka" (Singer: Vijayalakshmi Kannarao group)
- "Jaya Jaya Maharudra" (Dandakam) (Singers: A.V.S. Murthy group)
- "Dendamu Dochina Nandakishorudu Endu Daageno" ((Lyrics: C. Narayana Reddy; Singers: Ghantasala)
- "Nadame Vedasaram Ananda" ((Lyrics: C. Narayana Reddy; Singers: A.V.S. Murthy, S. Janaki and Ghantasala; Cast: Kanta Rao)
- "Ninuganna Kanulu Swami Neevunna Taavule Brundavanulu" (Singer: P. Susheela)
- "Yakumbendu Tusharahara Dhavala Ya Subhavastra" (Slokam) (Singer: P. B. Srinivas)
- "Yadubala Sritajapala Darisanameevaya Gopala" (Lyrics: Veeturi; Singers: Ghantasala group)
- "Saranga Toluta Nee Ramaneeya Rupame Kannaanu" (Poem) (Singer: P. Susheela)
- "Saa Sakala Dharmalalo SarvatamOttamadedi" (Poems) (Singers: Vijayalakshmi Kannarao and Ghantasala)
- "Hayiga Padana Geetam Jagamulu Pogadaga Jejelu" (Lyrics: Veeturi; Singers: P. B. Srinivas and Ghantasala)
