= Kutumba Gowravam =

- Theatrical release poster
- Directed by: B. S. Ranga
- Written by: Anishetty (dialogues)
- Produced by: B. S. Ranga
- Starring: N. T. Rama Rao; Savitri
- Cinematography: B. N. Hari
- Edited by: P. G. Mohan; M. Devendranath
- Music by: Viswanathan–Ramamoorthy
- Production company: Vikram Studios
- Release date: 7 November 1957
- Running time: 153 minutes
- Country: India
- Language: Telugu

Kutumba Gowravam (transl. Family prestige) is a 1957 Indian Telugu-language drama film, produced and directed by B. S. Ranga under the Vikram Studios banner. It stars N. T. Rama Rao and Savitri, with music composed by Viswanathan–Ramamoorthy. The film was remade in Tamil under the same name, banner and director. The film was recorded a commercial success.

== Cast ==
- N. T. Rama Rao as Gopalam
- Savitri as Satya
- Rajanala as Shankaraiah
- Padmanabham as Pratap
- Vangara as Marvadi
- Raghuramaiah as Giri
- Balakrishna as Pichodu
- Doraiswamy as Zamindar
- Kannamba as Rangamma
- E. V. Saroja as Mohana
- Baby Uma as Bala

== Soundtrack ==
Music composed by Viswanathan–Ramamoorthy. Lyrics were written by Anishetty.

S. No.	Song title	Singers	length
1	"Padara Pada Pada"	Ghantasala	3:50
2	"Soda Beedi Beeda"	Pitapuram	1:33
3	"Challani Samsaram"	P. Leela	3:04
4	"Podamu Ravoi Bava"	S. Janaki	3:54
5	"Kaaniki Koragaaru"	P. Leela	3:45
6	"Rammayya Mamayya"	P. Leela	4:16
7	"Anandale Nindali"	P. B. Sreenivas, K. Jamuna Rani, L. R. Eswari	3:13
8	"Rayyudori Intikada"	Pithapuram Nageswara Rao, K. Jamuna Rani	1:45
9	"Padavoi Raithanna"	Madhavapeddi Satyam, K. Jamuna Rani	3:54
