= Aggi Barata =

- Theatrical release poster
- Directed by: B. Vittalacharya
- Written by: G.K.Murthy (dialogues)
- Screenplay by: B. V. Acharya
- Story by: B. V. Acharya
- Produced by: B. Vittalacharya
- Starring: N. T. Rama Rao; Rajasree
- Cinematography: D. Varadarajan
- Edited by: K. Govinda Swamy
- Music by: Vijaya Krishna Murthy
- Production company: Sri Vital Combines
- Release date: 17 October 1966
- Running time: 124 minutes
- Country: India
- Language: Telugu

Aggi Barata (transl. Fire Blast) is a 1966 Telugu-language swashbuckling fantasy film, produced and directed by B. Vittalacharya under the Sri Vital Combines banner. It stars N. T. Rama Rao, Rajasree with music composed by Vijaya Krishna Murthy.

== Cast ==
- N. T. Rama Rao as Raja
- Rajasree as Vasavi
- S. V. Ramadasu as Gajapathi
- Ramana Reddy as Bham Bham Basavaiah
- Mikkilineni as Amara Simha Maharaju
- Mukkamala as Konda Buchodu
- Balakrishna as Govindu
- Vanisri

== Soundtrack ==
Aggi Barata

Film score by Vijaya Krishna Murthy
- Released: 1966
- Genre: Soundtrack
- Length: 28:58
- Producer: Vijaya Krishna Murthy

The music was composed by Vijaya Krishna Murthy.

S. No.	Song title	Lyrics	Singers	length
1	"Mabbulu Tholagenule"	C. Narayana Reddy	Ghantasala, P. Susheela	3:12
2	"Chirunavvuloni Haayi"	C. Narayana Reddy	Ghantasala, P. Susheela	4:49
3	"Endhuku Kaligenu"	C. Narayana Reddy	Ghantasala, P. Susheela	3:39
4	"Churuku Churuku"	Kosaraju	Madhavapeddi Satyam, L. R. Eswari	3:40
5	"Cheli Yemaaye"	C. Narayana Reddy	P. Susheela, S. Janaki	4:16
6	"Cham Cham Gurram"	G.K.Murthy	L. R. Eswari, Basaweswar, Raghavulu	4:59
7	"Mallelamma Mallelu"	Kosaraju	Ghantasala, Pithapuram, Swarnalatha	3:23
