= Sri Ramanjaneya Yuddham =

- Theatrical release poster
- Directed by: Bapu
- Written by: Gabbita Venkata Rao (story / dialogues)
- Produced by: Potluri Venkata Narayana Rao; SBK Uma Maheswara Rao
- Starring: N. T. Rama Rao; B. Saroja Devi; Ramakrishna
- Cinematography: K. S. Prasad; S. S. lal
- Edited by: B. Harinarayana; Mandapaati Ramachandra Rao
- Music by: K. V. Mahadevan
- Production company: Lakshmi Narayana Pictures
- Release date: 10 January 1975
- Running time: 164 mins
- Country: India
- Language: Telugu

Sri Ramanjaneya Yuddham (transl. War between Rama and Hanuman) is a {1975} Indian Telugu-language Hindu mythological film, produced by Potluri Venkata Narayana and SBK Uma Maheswara Rao under the Lakshmi Narayana Pictures banner and directed by Bapu. It stars N. T. Rama Rao, B. Saroja Devi, Ramakrishna and music composed by K. V. Mahadevan. The movie is a remake of 1963 Kannada movie Sri Ramanjaneya Yuddha.

== Cast ==
- N. T. Rama Rao as Lord Rama
- B. Saroja Devi as Sita
- Kanta Rao as Narada Maharshi
- Arja Janardhana Rao as Lord Hanuman
- Dhulipala as Yayati
- Mukkamala as Vishwamitra
- Sridhar as Bharatha
- Ramakrishna as Lakshmana
- Nagaraju as Lakshmana
- P. J. Sarma as Lord Siva
- Rajasree as Parvati
- Jayanthi as Shantimathi
- Hemalatha as Anjana Devi
- Manjula
- Suvarna as Maya

== Soundtrack ==
Sri Ramanjaneya Yuddham

Film score by K. V. Mahadevan
- Released: 1975
- Genre: Soundtrack
- Length: 60:42
- Label: EMI Columbia Audio
- Producer: K. V. Mahadevan

Music composed by K. V. Mahadevan. Music released by EMI Columbia Audio Company.

S. No	Song title	Lyrics	Singers	length
1	"Meluko Srirama"	Dasaradhi	M. Balamuralikrishna, P. Leela	4:10
2	"Jayathu Jayathu Srirama"	Kosaraju	Madhavapeddi Satyam, Vasantha	4:33
3	"Karunaalola Narayana"	Gabbita Venkata Rao	M. Balamuralikrishna	3:15
4	"Srikaramou Srirama Namam"	Aarudhra	P. Susheela, Vasantha	3:11
5	"Ra Ra O Raja"	C. Narayana Reddy	S. Janaki	3:43
6	"Sriyuthamou Srirama Padam"	Aarudhra	P. Susheela, Vasantha	2:14
7	"Rama Neela Megha Syama"	Gabbita Venkata Rao	K. Raghuramaiah	4:00
8	"Jaya Jaya Sugriva Raja"	Dasaradhi	P. Susheela	3:56
9	"Saranamu Neeve Srirama"	Gabbita Venkata Rao	M. S. Rama Rao	1:18
10	"Rama Tagunaa"	Gabbita Venkata Rao	K. Raghuramaiah	4:08
11	"Bheesha Namoy Sri Rama Namam"	Aarudhra	P. Susheela, Vasantha	3:38
12	"Amaraadhe"	Gabbita Venkata Rao	Madhavapeddi Satyam	1:39
13	"Kshmame Kadha"	Gabbita Venkata Rao	M. Balamuralikrishna	1:19
12	"Sri Maha Vishnu Deva"	Gabbita Venkata Rao	Madhavapeddi Satyam	19:38
