= Ekaveera =

1935 novel by Viswanatha Satyanarayana

- Author: Viswanatha Satyanarayana
- Language: Telugu
- Genre: Family
- Publisher: Bharathi magazine
- Publication date: 1935
- Publication place: India
- Media type: Print
- Pages: 116

Ekaveera (Telugu: ఏకవీర) is an Indian novel written by Kavi Samrat Viswanatha Satyanarayana in Telugu language. It was penned between 1929–1931 and was published in Bharathi magazine in 1935. Originally written in Telugu, it has since been translated into various Indian languages. This is the second novel of Viswanadha and it is the only novel written by the poet with his own handwriting. In 1969, a film version was released.

== Telugu film ==
A musical film was produced based on the novel in 1969.

=== Cast ===
Actor / Actress	Character
Nandamuri Taraka Rama Rao	Puttan Sethupati
T. L. Kanta Rao	Veerabhupati
K.R. Vijaya	Ekaveera
Jamuna	Meenakshi
Mukkamala Krishna Murthy	Maharajah of Puttana kingdom
Kaikala Satyanarayana	Prince Tirumala Nayakudu
Dhulipala	Father of Veerbhupati
Nirmalamma	Mother of Ekaveera
Santha Kumari	Manga, Mother of Sethupathi
Sriranjani	Mother of Meenakshi
Rajababu	Bhattu
Meena Kumari	Champakamala
Rajasulochana	Dancer
Vangara Venkata Subbaiah	
Mikkilineni	Udaya Sethupathi, Father of Sethupathi
Kutty Padmini	Amrutham

=== Songs ===
All music is composed by K. V. Mahadevan.

Track Listing
No.	Title	Lyrics	Singer(s)	Length
1.	"Kanipettagalava Maguva"	Devulapalli Krishnasastri	P. Susheela, Chorus
2.	"Kanudammulanu Moosi Kalaganti Okanadu"	C. Narayana Reddy	Ghantasala
3.	"Krishna Nee Peru Talachina Chalu"	C. Narayana Reddy	P. Susheela
4.	"Letha Vayasu Kulikindoy"	C. Narayana Reddy	B. Vasantha, S. P. Balasubrahmanyam
5.	"Oka Deepam Veligindi Oka Roopam Velicindi"	C. Narayana Reddy	Ghantasala, P. Susheela
6.	"Oune Cheliya Sari Sari"	Devulapalli Krishnasastri	P. Susheela
7.	"Prati Raatri Vasantha Raatri"	Devulapalli Krishnasastri	Ghantasala, S. P. Balasubrahmanyam
8.	"Thotaloo Naaraju Thongi Choosenu Naadu"	C. Narayana Reddy	P. Susheela, Ghantasala
9.	"Vandanamu Janani Bhavani"	Devulapalli Krishnasastri	Ghantasala
10.	"Ye Parijatammu Leeyagalano Sakhi"	C. Narayana Reddy	S. P. Balasubrahmanyam
11.	"Yeduru Choochina Valapu Thotalu"	C. Narayana Reddy	P. Susheela
12.	"Yenta Dooramo Adi"	C. Narayana Reddy	S. P. Balasubrahmanyam, P. Susheela
