= Veeranjaneya =

- Theatrical release poster
- Directed by: Kamalakara Kameswara Rao
- Starring: Arja Janardhana Rao; Kanta Rao; Anjali Devi; S. V. Ranga Rao; Jaggayya
- Music by: S. Rajeswara Rao
- Release date: April 5, 1968
- Country: India
- Language: Telugu

Veeranjaneya is a 1968 Indian Telugu-language musical film directed by Kamalakara Kameswara Rao. It stars Arja Janardhana Rao, Kanta Rao, Anjali Devi and S.V. Ranga Rao. The film was dubbed in Kannada as Veeranjaneya Katha in 1974.

== Plot ==
The story is based on the Ramayana, from the perspective of the Hindu god Anjaneya.

== Cast ==
Actor/Actress	Role
Arja Janardhana Rao	Anjaneya/Hanuman
Kanta Rao	Lord Rama/Lord Krishna
Anjali Devi	Sita/Rukmini
S.V. Ranga Rao	Ravana
Jaggayya	Indrajit
Kanchana	Sulochana
Mikkilineni	Vibhishana
Nagayya	Valmiki
Dhulipala	Vishwamitra
Sobhan Babu	Narada
Prabhakar Reddy	Vayu Deva
Satyanarayana	Garuda
Vasanthi	Urmila
Jayanthi	Satyabhama
Ramakrishna	Arjuna
G. Varalakshmi	Mandodari
Mukkamala	Ahiravana
Vallam Narasimha Rao	Tumburudu
Raghavaiah	Lakshmana
Thyagaraju	Sugreeva/Vali
C.H. Krishnamurthy	Angada
Rathna	Dancer
Bhimaraju	Akshayakumara

== Soundtrack ==
- "Aho Rama Katha" (Lyricist: Malladhi; Singer: Ghantasala)
- "Manasaina Daananura" (Lyricist: Arudra)
- "Nava Ragame Saagenule" (Lyricist: Veturi Sundararamamurthy; Singers: M. Balamurali Krishna, P. B. Srinivas)
- "Neelala Ningilo" (Lyricist: Samudrala)
- "Rama Naamame Madhuram" (Lyricist: C. Narayana Reddy; Singers: Ghantasala Venkateswara Rao, P. B. Srinivas)
- "Rama Neenamamu" (Suguna Dharma) (Lyricist: C. Narayana Reddy; Singer: Ghantasala Venkateswara Rao)
- "Sri Rama Rama" (Lyricist: Malladi Ramakrishna Sastry; Singer: Ghantasala Venkateswara Rao)
- "Sri Rama Rama Rama" (Lyricist: Malladhi; Singer: Malathi
- "Vachchaava Jathagaada" (Lyricist: Samudrala)
