= Thobuttuvulu =

- Poster
- Directed by: Ranganatha Das C. V.
- Written by: Anisetty Subba Rao (dialogues)
- Produced by: Ranganatha Das C. V.
- Starring: Savitri; Jamuna; Sarada; Hemalatha; S. V. Ranga Rao; Jaggayya; Kantha Rao
- Cinematography: Kamal Ghosh
- Edited by: Kalyanasundaram; Radhakrishna
- Music by: C. Mohan Das
- Production company: Sadhana Films
- Release date: 23 November 1963
- Country: India
- Language: Telugu

Thobuttuvulu (transl. Siblings) is a 1963 Indian Telugu-language drama film directed by Ranganatha Das C. V. and starring Savitri, Jamuna, Sarada, Hemalatha, S. V. Ranga Rao, Jaggayya and Kantha Rao.

== Plot ==
Parvathi is the eldest among her siblings Rajani and Rukmini. Since they lost their parents at a young age, Parvathi took care of her younger siblings. Bhudevi, who also stays in the same house with her husband Garataiah and son Tirupati, becomes envious after seeing Parvathi, who is a beloved member of her respective family and is entitled to riches. Bhudevi plots a plan to get her son Tirupati engaged to Parvathi, so that all of the land will be theirs. Since Parvathi left to Patna, Tirupati goes there to convince her to marry him. However, Parvathi falls for Shankar, a well educated man from an orphanage, and they have a baby boy. Garataiah feels bad about Bhudevi and Tirupati's doings and subsequently sends an apology letter to Parvathi, which ends up in the hands of conspirators. The conspirators separate Shankar, who aspires to get a job in Calcutta, from Parvathi and her son. Shankar supposedly dies in a boat accident while Parvathi is separated from her son, who is taken care of by Garataiah. How Parvathi reunites with her son and whether Shankar died or not forms the rest of the story.

== Cast ==
- Savitri as Parvathi
- Jamuna as Rajani
- Sarada as Rukmini
- Hemalatha as Bhudevi
- S. V. Ranga Rao as Garataiah
- Jaggayya as Rajani's husband
- Kantha Rao as Shankar
- Padmanabham as Tirupati
- Raja Babu as the ward boy
- Chalam as the assistant priest and patient

== Soundtrack ==
The music was composed by C. Mohan Das and the lyrics were written by Anisetty Subba Rao. The songs "Madhuramaina Reyilo" and "Saagenu Jeevitha Naava" became popular.

Track listing
No.	Title	Singer(s)	Length
1.	"Sagenu Jeevitha Naava"	Ghantasala, P. Susheela	4:03
2.	"Madhuramaina Reyilo"	Ghantasala, P. Susheela	4:17
3.	"Emayya Premayya"	Ghantasala	3:05
4.	"Challani Ee Sallapamlo"	P. Susheela	4:53
5.	"Yavvaname Oka Kanukale"	Jamuna Rani	5:34
6.	"Padyams"	Ghantasala	0:56
Total length:			22:48

== Release and reception ==
In early November 1963, the exact release date of the film was reportedly unknown since it was unclear who the producer of the film was.

A critic from Zamin Ryot wrote that the new type of storytelling makes Thobuttuvulu a must-see film. The critic also praised the music and background score.

== Home media ==
The film is available for streaming on Sun NXT.
