= Kathanayika Molla =

- Directed by: B. Padmanabham
- Produced by: B. Purushottam
- Starring: Vanisree; Haranath; B. Padmanabham; Sobhan Babu
- Release date: 1970
- Country: India
- Language: Telugu

Kathanayika Molla is a 1970 Indian Telugu-language film directed by comedian Padmanabham. It is based on the life of the poet Molla, played by Vanisree. It features the songs Jagame Ramamayam and Manishini Brahmayya Mattito Chesenaya and received the Nandi Award for Best Feature Film. Songs were written by Dasharathi Krishnamacharya.

== Plot ==
The story is based on life of the poet Molla, who translated the Ramayana from Sanskrit into Telugu.

== Credits ==
=== Cast ===
- Vanisree as Molla
- Harinath as Lord Vishnu
- B. Padmanabham as Tenali Ramakrishna
- Tyagaraaju
- Sobhan Babu
- Gummadi as Kesana
- Nagabhushanam
- Allu Ramalingaiah as Avadhani
- Mikkilineni
- Jyothi Lakhsmi as Vidhusheemani
- Geethanjali as Ranganayaki
- Kaikala Satyanarayana as Sri Krishna Devaraya (King)

=== Crew ===
- Director: B. Padmanabham
- Producer: B. Purushottam
- Production Company: Rekha and Murali Productions
- Original Music: S. P. Kodandapani
- Playback singers: Ghantasala, S. P. Balasubrahmanyam and P. Susheela

== Songs ==
- "Doravo Evaravo Naa Korake Digina Devaravo" (Lyrics: Devulapalli Krishnasastri; Singers: P. Susheela and Ghantasala
- "Jagame Ramamayam Manase Aganita Taraka Namamayam" (Singer: P. Susheela)
- "Manishini Brahmayya Mattito Chesenaya" (Singer: S. P. Balasubrahmanyam)
- "Naane Cheluve Kannadiki" (Singer: L. R. Eswari)
- "Lanka Dahanam" (Singers: Ghantasala and party)
- "Vinduva Veenula Vinduga Govindu Nandallu Parinayamaina Gaadha" (Lyrics: Devulapalli Krishnasastri)

== Awards ==
- Nandi Award for Best Feature Film – Gold – B. Purushottam
