= Maa Daivam =

- Theatrical release poster
- Directed by: S. S. Balan
- Written by: D. V. Narasa Raju(dialogues)
- Screenplay by: S. S. Balan
- Story by: G. D. Madgulkar
- Based on: Do Aankhen Barah Haath (1957)
- Produced by: Maniyan; Vidyas Lakshman
- Starring: N. T. Rama Rao; Jayachitra
- Cinematography: M. C. Shekar
- Edited by: M. Umanath
- Music by: K. V. Mahadevan
- Production company: Udayam Productions
- Release date: 17 September 1976
- Running time: 144 minutes
- Country: India
- Language: Telugu

Maa Daivam (transl. Our God) is a 1976 Indian Telugu-language drama film, produced by Maniyan and Vidyas Lakshman under the Udayam Productions banner and directed by S. S. Balan. The film stars N. T. Rama Rao and Jayachitra, with music composed by K. V. Mahadevan. It is a remake of the Hindi film Do Aankhen Barah Haath (1957).

== Cast ==
- N. T. Rama Rao as Raju
- Jayachitra as Saroja
- Nagabhushanam as Simhadri
- Giri Babu as Govinda Swamy
- M. N. Nambiar as Bhairavudu
- Padmanabham as Sanyassi
- Prabhakar Reddy as Naganna
- Rajanala as Superintendent
- Pandari Bai as Raju's mother
- Thyagaraju as David
- Bheema Raju as Khadar
- K. V. Chalam as Gopala Swamy
- Balakrishna as Veeranna
- Chalapathi Rao as Prisoner No. 108
- Jagga Rao

== Soundtrack ==
The soundtrack was composed by K. V. Mahadevan.

Track listing
No.	Title	Lyrics	Singer(s)	Length
1.	"Okey Kulam Okey"	Rajasri	S. P. Balasubrahmanyam	4:25
2.	"Challani Chirugaali"	C. Narayana Reddy	S. P. Balasubrahmanyam, P. Susheela	4:32
3.	"Maghamsam Mangalavaaram"	C. Narayana Reddy	Vani Jairam	3:42
4.	"Edho Edho"	Aarudhra	S. P. Balasubrahmanyam, P. Susheela	3:45
5.	"Manishiloni Manasu"	Aarudhra	P. Susheela	2:40
Total length:				19:07
