= Devata (1965 film) =

- Theatrical release poster
- Directed by: K. Hemambharadhara Rao
- Screenplay by: K. Hemambharadhara Rao
- Story by: Veeturi
- Produced by: B. Purushottam [[Padmanabham (actor)|Padmanabham]] (Presents)
- Starring: N. T. Rama Rao; Savitri
- Cinematography: M. G. Singh
- Edited by: M. S. N. Murthy
- Music by: S. P. Kodandapani
- Production companies: Rekha & Murali Combines
- Release date: 24 July 1965
- Running time: 168 mins
- Country: India
- Language: Telugu

Devata (transl. Goddess) is a 1965 Indian Telugu-language drama film, produced by B. Purushottam, presented by comedian Padmanabham under his Rekha & Murali Combines banner and directed by K. Hemambharadhara Rao. It stars N. T. Rama Rao and Savitri, with music composed by S. P. Kodandapani.

== Cast ==
- N. T. Rama Rao as Prasad
- Savitri as Seeta and Lalitha
- V. Nagayya as Lokabhiramaiah
- Rajanala as Jagannatham
- Padmanabham as Varahalu / Prem Kumar
- Vallam Narasimha Rao as Ramesh
- Vangara as Anjaneyulu
- Perumallu as Sheshaiah
- Balakrishna
- Geetanjali as Hema
- Hemalatha
- Nirmalamma as Parvatamma
- Master Murali as Madhu

=== Cameo appearances ===
- S. V. Ranga Rao as himself
- Gummadi as himself
- Relangi as himself
- Ramana Reddy as himself
- Kanta Rao as himself
- Raja Babu
- Nagesh
- Anjali Devi as herself
- Krishna Kumari as herself
- Jamuna as herself
- Sowcar Janaki as herself
- Vanisri

== Soundtrack ==
Devata

Film score by S. P. Kodandapani
- Released: 1965
- Genre: Soundtrack
- Producer: S. P. Kodandapani

Music composed by S. P. Kodandapani.

S. No.	Song title	Lyrics	Singers	length
1	"Aalayaana Velasina"	Veeturi VSSN Murthy	Ghantasala	3:43
2	"Are Kushi Kushi"	Dasaradhi	S. Janaki	4:06
3	"Bhalare Dheeruda"	Palagummi Padmaraju	P. B. Sreenivas, S. Janaki	3:41
4	"Tholi Valape Pade Pade"	Veeturi VSSN Murthy	Ghantasala, P. Susheela	4:31
5	"Mavooru Madarasu"	Kosaraju	Padmanabham, L. R. Eswari	
6	"Kannullo Misamisalu"	Veeturi	Ghantasala, P. Susheela	4:39
7	"Naaku Neeve Kaavalera"	C. Narayana Reddy	Madhavapeddi Satyam, S. Janaki	
8	"Bommanu Chesi Pranamu Posi"	Sri Sri	Ghantasala	4:32

== Production ==
Veeturi wrote this story for a drama company called Rekha and Murali Arts. Later everyone involved thought that the story was not suitable for a stage drama as the heroine of the story has to perform a dual role. It was felt that the story was suitable for a motion picture. Padmanabham took up the task of producing the film under the banner Rekha & Murali Arts with the support from Kakarla Venkateswarlu of Vani film distributors. Padmanabhan mortgaged his house for Rs. 40,000 for the initial capital. Most of the shooting was done in Vauhini Studios, Chennai in three months.

- Vanisri acted as a guest in the college anniversary festival song "Naaku Neeve Kaavalera".
- Master Murali acted as Madhu, son of Prasad and Seeta. He is the eldest son of B. Padmanabham.
- Padmanabham portrayed the character as Varahalu, who is crazy about films and film actors. In the film, he visits Madras to personally meet many famous film actors of that time.
- Vallam Narasimha Rao, one of the partners in Rekha and Murali Arts has acted in the film as the lover of Savitri.
