= Kantha Rao =

Indian actor (1923–2009)

- Born: Tadepalli Lakshmi Kantha Rao; 16 November 1923; Kodada, Hyderabad State, British India
- Died: 22 March 2009 (aged 85); Hyderabad, Andhra Pradesh, India
- Other names: Nata Prapoorna; Kattula Kanta Rao
- Occupation: Actor
- Years active: 1950s–1990s
- Spouses: Suseela; Hymavathi (m. 1950)

Tadepalli Lakshmi Kantha Rao (16 November 1923 – 22 March 2009) was an Indian actor and producer known for his works predominantly in Telugu cinema. Regarded as one of the finest method actors, Rao appeared in more than 400 feature films, starring in many, in a variety of genres including mythological, social and folklore. After a success string in folklore and swashbuckling films, he became popularly referred to as Kattula Kantha Rao. He has also acted in a few Hindi, Kannada, Tamil, and Malayalam movies. He has produced about five films under the Hyma Films banner.

In the 1960s, he was one of the primary actors in Telugu cinema, along with N. T. Rama Rao and Akkineni Nageswara Rao. Kantha Rao was known for portraying the roles of Narada, Lord Krishna and Arjuna in mythological films. He played Lakshmana in the blockbuster film Lava Kusa, for which he received Vishehsa Puraskaram in 1963.

== Early life ==
Rao was born into a Telugu Brahmin family to Kesavarao and Seetaramamma at Kodad of Suryapet district in present-day Telangana on 16 November 1923. According to the Hindu calendar, it corresponds to Rudhirodgari Samvatsara Kartika Sudha Ashtami day. He lost his father the next year. His primary education was done in Gudibanda and Khammam. He was exposed to puranas and Hindu epic stories from his grandmother.

== Career ==
Surabhi Drama troupe has visited their village. Impressed by their professional performances, he established "Balamitra Natya Mandali" and used to play Gayopakhyanam and Madhuseva plays with his friends. He played the character Brahma in Sri Krishna Leelalu in the group "Surabhi" and subsequently in the plays Madhuseva, Kanakatara and Telugu Talli.

Rao was sent to Tenali to distract from the drama activities. Tenali used to be very active in drama activities with stalwarts like Pulipati Lakshminarayana. He used to stay in same street where Rentachintala Satyanarayana and Banda Kanakalingeswara Rao used to live.

He then shifted to Madras in 1950 and used to stay with T. Krishnamachari, who used to work as assistant director for H. M. Reddy's Rohini Pictures.

H. M. Reddy gave him a chance to play a small role in Nirdoshi in 1951 and as his hero for Pratigna in 1953. He has acted in 450 films and in about 100 films as hero, whereas in others as different character roles. They include some popular roles in films like Jayasimha (1955), Shri Krishna Pandaviyam (1966), Guruvunu Minchina Sishyudu (1963), Lava Kusha (1963), Nartanasala (1963), Pandava Vanavasam (1965) and Muthyala Muggu (1975). His last movie was Pandurangadu, with Balakrishna, directed by K. Raghavendra Rao in 2008.

He produced four films between 1969 and 1974, Saptaswaralu, Gandara Gandadu, Premajeevulu and Gundelu Theesina Monagadu and lost all his previous earnings. The last film he made was Swathi Chinukulu. Subsequently, he moved to Hyderabad.

== Awards ==
National honours

- Visesha Puraskaram in Ramineni Foundation Awards in 2004.
- Mahanati Savitri Award
- C.H. Narayana Rao Award

Nandi Awards

- Raghupathi Venkaiah Award by the government of Andhra Pradesh in 2000, for lifetime achievement.
- Nandi Award for Best Book, for Anaganaga Oka Raakumaarudu won for the year 2007.

== Filmography ==
=== Telugu films ===
List of Kantha Rao Telugu film credits
Year	Title	Role	Ref.
1951	Nirdoshi		
1955	Jayasimha	Vijayasimha	
1956	Ilavelpu		
1957	Sati Anasuya		
1959	Jaya Vijaya		
1959	Sabash Ramudu		
1959	Sati Sukanya	Ashwini Devatalu	
1960	Bhatti Vikramarka	Bhatti	
1960	Chivaraku Migiledi	Prakasam	
1960	Rama Sundari		
1960	Sahasra Siracheda Apoorva Chintamani	Prathapa Simha	
1960	Deepavali	Narada Muni	
1960	Sanchari		
1960	Kanakadurga Pooja Mahima	Madhava	
1960	Santhi Nivasam	Raju	
1960	Sri Krishna Rayabaram		
1961	Sabash Raja		
1961	Sati Sulochana	Narada Muni	
1961	Sri Seetha Rama Kalyanam	Narada Muni	
1961	Usha Parinayam	Aniruddha	
1961	Varalakshmi Vratham		
1962	Madana Kama Raju Katha		
1962	Bhishma	Salwa	
1962	Chitti Tammudu	Srihari	
1962	Khaidi Kannayya		
1962	Nuvva Nena		
1962	Padandi Munduku		
1962	Raktha Sambandham	Anand	
1962	Swarna Gowri		
1963	Sri Krishnarjuna Yudham	Narada Muni	
1963	Valmiki		
1963	Aapta Mitrulu		
1963	Deva Sundari		
1963	Edureeta	Village Doctor	
1963	Somavara Vrata Mahatyam	Chandrangada	
1963	Guruvunu Minchina Sishyudu	Vijayudu	
1963	Lava Kusa	Lakshmana	
1963	Nartanasala	Lord Krishna	
1963	Vishnumaya		
1963	Thobuttuvulu	Shankar	
1964	Babruvahana	Lord Krishna	
1964	Desa Drohulu		
1964	Marmayogi		
1964	Thotalo Pilla Kotalo Rani	Vijaya	
1964	Sri Satyanarayana Mahatyam		
1965	Aada Bratuku		
1965	Devata	Cameo	
1965	Dorikithe Dongalu		
1965	Pratigna Palana	Rajasekharudu	
1965	Aakasaramanna		
1965	Jwaladweepa Rahasyam		
1965	Pandava Vanavasam	Lord Krishna	
1965	Sri Simhachala Kshetra Mahima	Pururava Chakravarthi	
1965	Veerabhimanyu	Arjuna	
1966	Bhimanjaneya Yuddham	Nala Kuber	
1966	Mohini Bhasmasura	Vishnu	
1966	Paduka Pattabhishekam	Rama	
1966	Palnati Yuddham	Nalagamaraju	
1966	Sri Krishna Pandaveeyam	Narada Muni	
1966	Sri Krishna Tulabharam	Narada Muni	
1966	Srimathi	Ravi	
1967	Chikkadu Dorakadu	Dorakadu	
1967	Kanchu Kota	Narendra	
1967	Iddaru Monagallu		
1967	Devuni Gelichina Manavudu	Vijayadattudu	
1967	Pinni		
1967	Aggi Dora	Jayanth	
1967	Rahasyam		
1968	Rajayogam		
1968	Veeranjaneya		
1968	Bangaru Gaajulu		
1968	Niluvu Dopidi	Guest	
1968	Evaru Monagadu	Inspector Sekhar	
1969	Devudichina Bharta	Sridatta	
1969	Saptaswaralu	Saranga	
1969	Ukku Pidugu	Vasantha Rayalu	
1969	Tarasasankam		
1969	Ekaveera	Veerbhupati	
1969	Gandara Gandadu	Manoharudu	
1970	Oke Kutumbham		
1970	Suguna Sundari Katha	Prasuna	
1970	Merupu Veerudu		
1971	Sri Krishna Vijayamu		
1971	Kathiki Kankanam		
1971	Ananda Nilayam		
1971	Sri Krishna Satya	Narada Muni	
1971	Chelleli Kapuram		
1971	Andam Kosam Pandem	Madhavudu	
1972	Sri Krishnanjaneya Yuddham	Narada Muni	
1972	Bala Bharatam	Pandu Raju	
1973	Devudu Chesina Manushulu	Suresh	
1973	Mayadari Malligadu	Jailor	
1973	Neramu Siksha	Rajasekharam	
1974	Alluri Seetharama Raju	Padalu	
1974	Sri Ramanjaneya Yuddham	Narada Muni	
1974	Devadasu		
1974	O Seeta Katha	Madhava Rao	
1974	Nippulanti Manishi	Police Inspector who takes care of a young Vijay	
1974	Nirnayam		
1975	Muthyala Muggu	Raja Rao Bahadur	
1975	Pooja		
1975	Maya Machhindra		
1975	Eduruleni Manishi	Sarkar	
1976	Padi Pantalu	Ex-Army man and Gopi's mentor	
1976	Mahatmudu		
1976	Raaja	Gajapathi Varma	
1976	Shri Rajeshwari Vilas Coffee Club		
1976	America Ammayi		
1976	Magaadu		
1976	Mahakavi Kshetrayya		
1976	Seeta Kalyanam		
1977	Kurukshetram	Drupada	
1977	Yamagola	Indrudu	
1977	Edureeta		
1978	Vayasu Pilichindi		
1978	Agent Gopi	Intelligence Chief	
1978	Manavoori Pandavulu	Dharmayya	
1978	Patnavasam	Ramaiah	
1978	Sahasavanthudu	Jumra	
1978	Gorantha Deepam		
1978	Lawyer Viswanath		
1979	Yugandhar	Inspector Varma	
1979	Andadu Aagadu	Inspector General of Police	
1979	Korikale Gurralaithe	Jagannatha Rao	
1979	Maa Voori Devatha	Dr. Sanjeeva Rao	
1979	Samajaniki Saval	Prakash's (Chakrapani) father	
1979	Mande Gundelu		
1979	Sommokadidhi Sokokadidhi		
1980	Chandipriya		
1980	Mahalakshmi	Kalidasu	
1980	Vamsa Vruksham		
1980	Kaali		
1980	Superman		
1980	Chukkallo Chandrudu		
1980	Sarada Ramudu	Raja Rao	
1980	Ram Robert Rahim	Catholic priest	
1980	Prema Tarangalu	Ranga Rao	
1981	Satyabhama		
1981	Radha Kalyanam		
1981	Kondaveeti Simham		
1981	Oorukichina Maata	Pratapa Rao	
1981	Sati Savitri		
1982	Kaliyuga Ramudu	Peter the Trumpet Player	
1982	Shamsher Shankar	Hanumantha Rao	
1982	Ekalavya		
1982	Krishnavataram		
1982	Pratigna	Bhushayya	
1982	Golconda Abbulu		
1983	Moodu Mullu	Dharmaiah	
1983	Amarajeevi		
1983	Chattaniki Veyyi Kallu	Raghunath, Commissioner of Police	
1983	Moogavani Paga	Ramaiah	
1983	Puli Debba	Srimannarayana	
1983	Mayagadu	Dr. Rama Rao	
1983	Poratam	Ranganayakulu	
1983	Lanke Bindelu	Kanthaiah	
1984	Sardar	Gangadharam	
1984	Padmavyuham		
1984	Sundari Subbarao	Jagannatham	
1985	America Alludu	Raghava Rao	
1985	Vijetha	Venkayya (guest)	
1985	Mantra Dandam	Vishnu Dutta	
1985	Musugu Donga	Veerayya	
1985	Nerasthudu	Ramanna Master	
1985	Nyayam Meere Cheppali		
1985	Pachani Kapuram	Ananda Rao	
1986	Simhasanam		
1986	Tandra Paparayudu		
1986	Sri Shirdi Saibaba Mahathyam	Shyama	
1986	Vikram		
1986	Srimathi Kanuka		
1986	Chaitanyam		
1986	Vivaha Bandham		
1986	Desoddharakudu		
1986	Santhi Nivasam	Dr. Rao	
1986	Chanakya Sapadham	Sasi's father	
1987	Viswanatha Nayakudu		
1987	Ummadi Mogudu		
1987	Rotation Chakravarthy		
1988	Jhansi Rani		
1988	Ramudu Bheemudu		
1989	Swathi Chinukulu		
1991	Alludu Diddina Kapuram		
1993	Naga Jyothi		
1994	Mugguru Monagallu		
1994	Bangaru Kutumbam		
1994	Atha Kodalu		
1994	Alludu Poru Ammayi Joru	Headmaster	
1996	Puttinti Gowravam		
1998	Naga Shakthi		
1998	Kante Koothurne Kanu		
1999	Postman		
2003	Kabirdas		
2003	Nijam	Narayana Rao	
2003	Satyam		
2003	Simhachalam	Somayajulu	
2003	Seetayya		
2001	Chinna	Judge	
2005	Dhana 51		
2007	Shankar Dada Zindabad		
2008	Pandurangadu		

=== Other language films ===
List of Kantha Rao other language film credits
Year	Title	Role	Language
1957	Mahiravana		Kannada
1960	Ranadheera Kanteerava		Kannada
1960	Aasha Sundari		Kannada
1961	Nagarjuna		Kannada
1963	Valmiki		Kannada
1963	Manthiri Kumaran		Tamil
1972	Sree Guruvayoorappan		Malayalam
1974	Devi Kanyakumari		Malayalam
1975	Alakh Niranjan		Hindi
1978	Ilamai Oonjal Aadukirathu		Tamil

=== Producer ===
- Saptaswaralu (1969)
- Gandara Gandadu (1969)
- Premajeevulu (1971)
- Gundelu Teesina Monagaadu (1974)
- Swaati Chinukulu (1989)

== Personal life ==
Rao was married to Suseela and had a daughter in 1942. Their daughter died of smallpox during infancy. They had a son in 1945 named after his father as Keshav. He married Hymavathi in 1950; Suseela died of an illness soon afterwards. His son also died of typhoid fever in his childhood. He had four sons and a daughter by Hymavathi, named Pratap, Keshav, Suseela, Raja and Satyam, in that order.

His son Raja (Rajeswara Rao) has acted in Sudigundalu, Prema Jeevulu, Gandara Gandadu, Gundelu Teesina Monagadu, Swati Chinukulu, Ukku Pidugu, Rajasimha, Evaru Monagadu, Maro Prapancham and Manushulu Matti Bommalu.

His other son, Satyam, has acted in Saptaswaralu, Prema Jeevulu and Gandara Gandadu. His grandson Sai Eshwar worked as a child artist in television.

== Death ==
Rao died at Yashoda Hospital, Hyderabad on 22 March 2009 due to cancer complications.

== See also ==
- Raghupathi Venkaiah Award
