= Valluri Balakrishna =

Indian comedian

- Other name: Anjigadu
- Occupation: Actor

Valluri Balakrishna was an Indian actor who primarily appeared in Telugu films as a comedian. He acted in more than 100 films as a comedian, including in the movie Patala Bhairavi, as "Anji Gadu", alongside N. T. Rama Rao.

== Filmography ==
- 1951 Patala Bhairavi
- 1952 Pelli Chesi Choodu
- 1954 Chandraharam
- 1955 Donga Ramudu
- 1955 Missamma
- 1955 Jayasimha
- 1956 Chiranjeevulu
- 1956 Sri Gauri Mahatyam
- 1957 Bhagya Rekha
- 1957 Mayabazar as Sarathi
- 1957 Dongallo Dora
- 1957 Bhale Ammayilu
- 1957 Panduranga Mahatyam
- 1957 Suvarna Sundari
- 1957 Vaddante Pelli as Sony
- 1957 Kutumba Gowravam
- 1958 Aada Pettanam
- 1958 Dongalunnaru Jagratha
- 1959 Appu Chesi Pappu Koodu
- 1959 Banda Ramudu
- 1959 Rechukka Pagatichukka
- 1960 Pillalu Thechina Challani Rajyam as Medhavi
- 1960 Kanakadurga Pooja Mahima as Trilokam
- 1962 Gulebakavali Katha
- 1962 Dakshayagnam
- 1962 Khaidi Kannaiah
- 1962 Gundamma Katha
- 1962 Madana Kamaraju Katha as Thimmaraju
- 1963 Savati Koduku
- 1963 Irugu Porugu
- 1963 Guruvunu Minchina Sishyudu
- 1963 Pempudu Koothuru
- 1963 Bandipotu
- 1963 Nartanasala
- 1963 Somavara Vrata Mahatyam as Vinoda
- 1964 Aggi Pidugu
- 1964 Marmayogi
- 1965 Mangamma Sapatham
- 1965 Prameelarjuneeyam
- 1965 Pratigna Palana
- 1965 Vijaya Simha
- 1966 Aggi Barata
- 1967 Chikkadu Dorakadu
- 1967 Vasantha Sena
- 1967 Sri Sri Sri Maryada Ramanna
- 1967 Aggi Dora as Saranga
- 1967 Ummadi Kutumbam
- 1968 Tikka Sankarayya
- 1968 Deva Kanya as Midthambotlu
- 1968 Uma Chandi Gowri Shankarula Katha
- 1968 Aggi Meeda Guggilam
- 1968 Pedarasi Peddamma Katha
- 1969 Sri Rama Katha as Dandi
- 1969 Saptaswaralu
- 1969 Kadaladu Vadaladu as Gajapathi
- 1969 Raja Simha as Pulitheji
- 1971 Ananda Nilayam
- 1971 Mattilo Manikyam as Drunkard
- 1971 Rajakota Rahasyam
- 1971 Pavitra Bandham
- 1971 Andam Kosam Pandem as Kilakilasri
- 1972 Datta Putrudu
- 1972 Sri Krishna Satya
- 1972 Pilla? Piduga? as Ratan
- 1972 Pandanti Kapuram
- 1973 Manchi Vallaki Manchivadu
- 1974 Nippulanti Manishi as Gangulu
- 1974 Tulabharam as Barber Kanaka Rao
- 1975 Pooja
- 1976 Andharu Bagundali as Beggar
- 1976 Maa Daivam
- 1976 Muthyala Pallaki
- 1977 Edureeta
- 1978 Lawyer Viswanath
- 1978 Mugguru Muggure as Museum Guard
- 1978 Dudu Basavanna as Photographer
- 1979 Tiger as Bullabbai
- 1980 Punnami Naagu as Mungisa Musalayya's (Padmanabham) brother-in-law
- 1980 Kodalu Vastunaru Jagratha
- 1980 Prema Tarangalu
- 1980 Kaksha
- 1981 Jeevitha Ratham as Priest in the marriage
- 1981 Taxi Driver as Appalakonda
- 1981 Prema Mandiram as Servant
- 1982 Bandhalu Anubandhalu
- 1982 Shamsher Shankar
- 1982 Manishiko Charithra
