= Mukkamala (actor) =

Indian actor (1920-1982)

Mukkamala Krishnamurthy
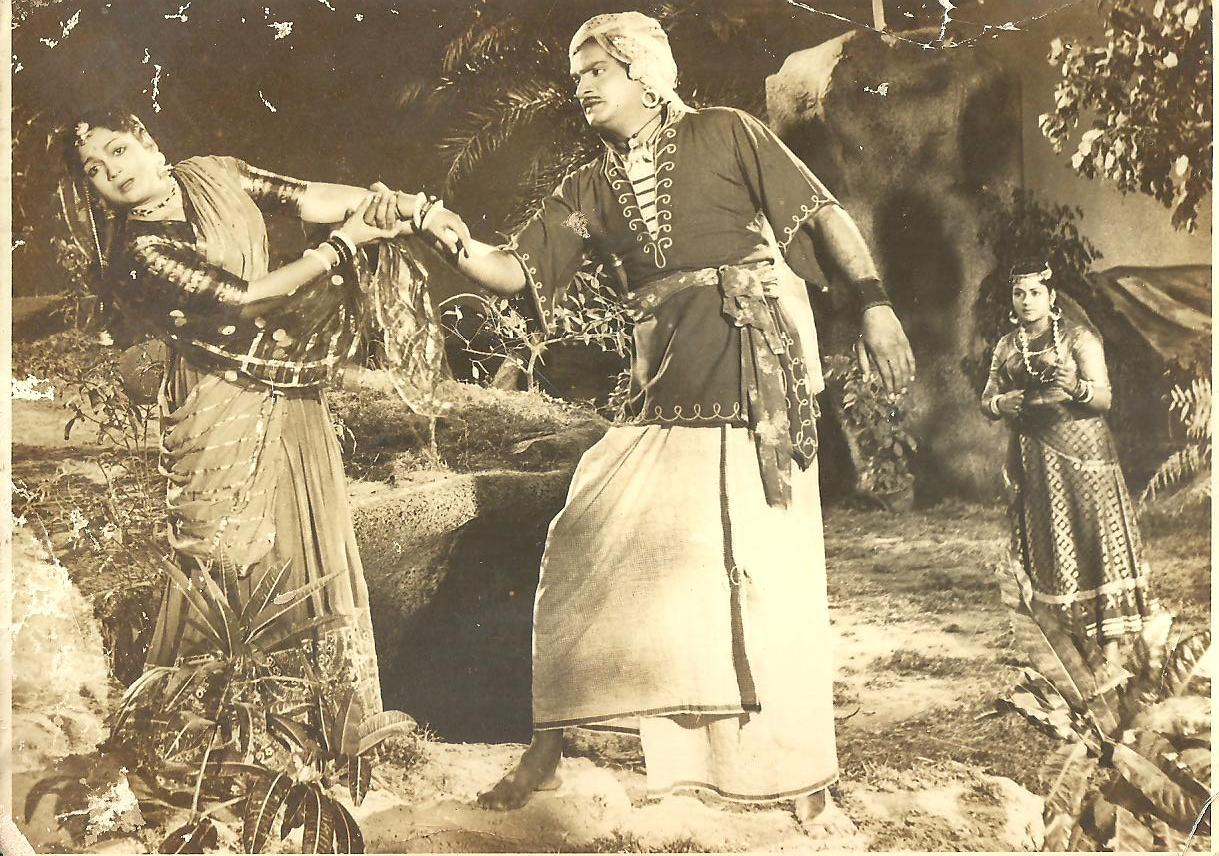
- Born: 1920; Gurazala,Palnadu India
- Died: 1982 (aged 61–62)
- Occupations: Actor, Director

Mukkamala Krishna Murthy (1920–1982), known mononymously by his surname as Mukkamala was a lawyer turned actor who was active in Telugu films in the 1950s and the 1960s. He was a stage actor in his student days and was popular in the role of French General Marquis de Bussy-Castelnau in Bobbili Yuddham, a stage play based on the historical Battle of Bobbili (Bobbili Yuddham). He joined the Telugu film industry in the late 1940s in Madras and played a variety of character roles in a career spanning some 35 years. He died in 1982 (in Bobbili Puli movie titles, we can see "Swargeeya Mukkamala").

== Filmography ==
=== Actor ===
==== 1940s ====
- Maya Machindra (1945)
- Laila Majnu (1949)

==== 1950s ====
- Swapna Sundari (1951)
- Nirdoshi (1951)
- Niraparadhi (1951)
- Mayalamari (1951)
- Prema (1952) as Parasuram
- Maradalu Pelli (1952)
- Dharma Devata (1952) as Raghunatha Varma
- Rechukka (1954) as Maharaju
- Aggiramudu (1954)
- Rani Ratnaprabha (1955)
- Tenali Ramakrishna (1956) as Tatacharyulu
- Sri Gauri Mahatyam (1956)
- Nala Damayanthi (1957)
- Sarangadhara (1957)
- Mayabazar (1957) as Duryodhana
- Appu Chesi Pappu Koodu (1958) as Rao Bahadur Ramadasu's Father
- Sobha (1958) as Lala
- Anna Thammudu (1958) as Nageswara Rao
- Jayabheri (1959) as Dharmadhikari
- Daiva Balam (1959)

==== 1960s ====
- Annapurna (1960) as Narahari
- Kanakadurga Pooja Mahima (1960) as Narendra Varma
- Jagadeka Veeruni Katha (1961) as Maharaju
- Usha Parinayam (1961) as Rajaguru
- Mahamantri Timmarasu (1962) as Prataparudra Gajapati
- Gulebakavali Katha (1962) as King Chandrasena
- Narthanasala (1963) as Viraata Raju
- Sri Krishnarjuna Yudham (1963) as Duryodhanudu
- Guruvunu Minchina Sishyudu (1963) as Guruvu
- Babruvahana (1964)
- Aggi Pidugu (1964)
- Bobbili Yudham (1964) as General Bussy
- Pandava Vanavasam (1965) as Durvasa
- Jwala Dweepa Rahasyam (1965) as Siddhendra Bhattaraka
- Satya Harishchandra (1965) as Viswamitra Maharshi
- Sri Krishna Pandaveeyam (1966) as Jarasandha
- Bhimanjaneya Yuddham (1966)
- Paramanandayya Sishyula Katha (1966)
- Palnati Yuddham (1966) as Kommaraju
- Aggi Barata (1966) as Konda Buchodu
- Adugu Jaadalu (1966) as Singanna
- Bhama Vijayam (1967)
- Bhuvana Sundari Katha (1967) as Chitrasenudu
- Ummadi Kutumbam (1967) as Subbaiah
- Goodachari 116 (1967)
- Sri Sri Sri Maryada Ramanna (1967)
- Bandipotu Dongalu (1968)
- Veeranjaneya (1968) as Ahiravana
- Bhagya Chakramu (1968)
- Baghdad Gaja Donga (1968)
- Asadhyudu (1968)
- Sri Rama Katha (1969) as Vishwamitra
- Ekaveera (1969)
- Nam Naadu (1969)

==== 1970s ====
- Vijayam Manade (1970)
- Pettandarulu (1971)
- Mayani Mamata (1970) as Kotaiah
- Bomma Borusa (1971)
- C I D Raju (1971) as Commissioner Raghava Rao
- Rangeli Raja (1971)
- Debbaku tha Dongala Mutha (1971) as Jaggu
- Apna Desh (1972) as Mrs. Dinanath Chandra (Hindi)
- Manavudu Danavudu (1972)
- Neethi (1972) (Tamil)
- Hanthakulu Devanthakulu (1972) as Supreme
- Korada Rani (1972) as Major Bhavani Prasad
- Doctor Babu (1973) as Dharmanna
- Andala Ramudu (1973)
- Andaru Dongale (1974) as Jailer
- Manchi Manushulu (1974)
- Sri Ramanjaneya Yuddham (1975)
- Muthyala Muggu (1975) as Villain
- Bhakta Kannappa (1976) as Pedavema Reddy
- Neram Nadi Kadu Akalidi (1976) as Jailor
- Ramarajyamlo Rakthapasam (1976)
- Kotalo Paga (1976)
- Pichi Maraju (1976) as Police Chief
- Seeta Kalyanam (1976) as Viswamitra Maharshi
- Bangaru Manishi (1976) as Collector
- Kurukshetram (1977) as Dhritarashtra
- Daana Veera Soora Karna (1977) as Shalya
- Chanakya Chandragupta (1977)
- Chakradhari (1977)
- Sneham (1977)
- Jaganmohini (1978)
- Pottelu Punnamma (1978) as Sethji
- Mugguru Muggure (1978) as Mirza
- Karunamayudu (1978)
- Lawyer Viswanath (1978) as Raghavaiah
- Gandharva Kanya (1979)
- Maa Voori Devatha (1979) as Police Chief
- Rangoon Rowdy (1979) as Judge
- Srungara Ramudu (1979) as Rama Narayana's Lawyer
- Sri Madvirata Parvam (1979) as Virata
- Sri Tirupati Venkateswara Kalyanam (1979)
- Gandharva Kanya (1979) as Marichi Maharshi
- Sri Rama Bantu (1979) as Chalapathi Rao

==== 1980s ====
- Vamsa Vruksham (1980)
- Prema Tarangalu (1980)
- Love in Singapore (1980) as Police Chief
- Gharana Donga (1980) as Rajaiah, Krishna's caretaker
- Bhale Krishnudu (1980)
- Kondaveeti Simham (1981)
- Prema Natakam (1981) as Suryanarayana, Kumar's uncle
- Kaliyuga Ramudu (1982)
- Justice Chowdary (1982)
- Bobbili Puli (1982)
- Anuraga Devatha (1982)
- Golconda Abbulu (1982)
- Iddaru Kodukulu (1982) as Commissioner
- Srimadvirat Veerabrahmendra Swami Charitra (1984)
- Idhe Naa Savaal (1984)

=== Director ===
- Maradalu Pelli (1952)
- Rushyasrunga (1961)
- Rishyasringar (1961)

== Awards ==
Facilitations performed by Kalarajyam, Hyderabad and Mukkammala was crowned as "Natabrahma" which means a creator of acting.

== Personal life ==
He was survived by four children: a son and three daughters. His eldest son is Subba Rao, eldest daughter Sita Rajya Lakshmi (an additional district judge at Nellore), second daughter Padmavathi (residing at Guntur), youngest daughter Seshamma (practising High Court advocate in Chennai).
