= Padmanabham (actor) =

Indian actor, producer, director

- Born: Basavaraju Venkata Padmanabha Rao; 20 August 1931; Simhadripuram, Kadapa district, Andhra Pradesh, India
- Died: 20 February 2010 (aged 78); Chennai, Tamil Nadu, India
- Occupations: Actor; comedian; director; film producer
- Awards: Nandi Awards

Basavaraju Venkata Padmanabha Rao (20 August 1931 – 20 February 2010), known mononymously as Padmanabham, was an Indian actor, comedian, producer, and director who predominantly worked in Telugu cinema and theatre. He is known for his comic expressions and dialogues. In a career spanning over six decades, he acted in more than 400 films.

Padmanabham made his film debut as a child actor in 1945 with Mayalokam. Shavukaru (1949) was his first major hit and gave him a footing as a comedian. Pathala Bhairavi (1951) helped him find a permanent place in Telugu cinema. He acted in small roles alongside Relangi and Ramana Reddy in the golden era of Telugu cinema in the 1950s and 1960s. Later, he became a prominent comedian and remained so till the mid-1970s when Raja Babu burst onto the scene and replaced him.

He also directed eight films including Kathanayika Molla (1969), a biographical film which won him the state Nandi Award. Padmanabham introduced S. P. Balasubrahmanyam to the film industry through Sri Sri Sri Maryada Ramanna (1967).

== Early life ==
Padmanabham was born to Basavaraju Venkata Seshayya and Santhamma in Simhadripuram near Pulivendula in Kadapa district, Andhra Pradesh, on 20 August 1931. He was a regular yoga practitioner and enjoyed good health till his death.

== Career ==
He started acting in his teenage when the director Gudavalli Ramabrahmam gave him a chance in Maayalokam (1945). Throughout his acting career he worked with almost 80 directors and acted in more than 400 movies. Padmanabham cherished his association with Gudavalli Ramabrahmam, Ghantasala Balaramayya, L. V. Prasad, and K. V. Reddy the most.

Padmanabham found it hard to mention any particular comic role as his most memorable one, but made a special mention of the role of a rickshaw puller that he played in Desoddhaarakudu (1975). "It had ample measure of 'karuna rasa' in it and I could display the other shade of my talent," he said. The role became famous for the song "Aakalayyi Annamadigithe Pichchodannaru Naayaallu".

== Death ==
Padmanabham died of a heart attack at his residence at Rangarajapuram, Kodambakkam, in Chennai on 20 February 2010.

== Selected filmography ==
=== As actor ===
- 1945 Mayalokam
- 1946 Narada Naradi
- 1946 Tyagayya
- 1947 Yogi Vemana
- 1948 Vindhyarani
- 1948 Bhakta Siriyala
- 1950 Shavukaru
- 1951 Pathala Bhairavi as Dingiri
- 1954 Sri Kalahastiswara Mahatyam as Kaasi
- 1954 Chandraharam
- 1955 Jayasimha as Subuddhi
- 1955 Donga Ramudu
- 1955 Santanam as Sekhar
- 1957 Bhagya Rekha
- 1957 Kutumba Gowravam as Prathap
- 1957 Panduranga Mahatyam as Pundarika's brother
- 1958 Appu Chesi Pappu Koodu as Panakala Rao
- 1959 Krishna Leelalu as Narada
- 1959 Rechukka Pagatichukka
- 1960 Raja Makutam
- 1961 Bharya Bharthalu as Anjaneyulu
- 1961 Iddaru Mitrulu
- 1961 Velugu Needalu
- 1961 Vagdanam as Padmanabham
- 1962 Aatma Bandhuvu
- 1962 Gulebakavali Katha
- 1962 Swarna Manjari as Srimukhudu
- 1962 Dakshayagnam as Daksha's Younger son
- 1962 Kula Gothralu as J. J. Rao / Jasthi Joga Rao
- 1963 Punarjanma
- 1963 Chaduvukunna Ammayilu as Anand
- 1963 Valmiki
- 1963 Thobuttuvulu
- 1964 Mooga Manasulu as Radha's Husband
- 1964 Vivaha Bandham
- 1964 Bobbili Yudham
- 1964 Devatha
- 1964 Dr. Chakravarthy
- 1964 Kalavari Kodalu as Bheema Rao
- 1965 Veerabhimanyu
- 1965 Pandava Vanavasam as Lakshmana Kumarudu
- 1965 Tene Manasulu
- 1965 Prameelarjuneeyam as Narada
- 1965 Pratigna Palana
- 1966 Sri Krishna Tulabharam
- 1966 Loguttu Perumallukeruka as 'The Great Detective' Dam
- 1966 Leta Manasulu as Sundaram
- 1966 Shakuntala as Madhavya
- 1966 Pidugu Ramudu
- 1966 Chilaka Gorinka
- 1966 Paramanandayya Shishyula Katha as Nandhi
- 1966 Potti Pleader
- 1966 Mohini Bhasmasura as Chakram
- 1966 Mangalasutram
- 1967 Aada Paduchu
- 1967 Gruhalakshmi
- 1967 Kanchu Kota
- 1967 Ave Kallu
- 1967 Bhakta Prahlada as Markudu
- 1967 Goodachari 116
- 1967 Grihalakshmi
- 1967 Poola Rangadu as Bujji
- 1967 Sri Sri Sri Maryada Ramanna as Maryada Ramanna
- 1967 Gopaludu Bhoopaludu
- 1968 Uma Chandi Gowri Shankarula Katha
- 1968 Tikka Sankarayya as Devayya
- 1968 Bhagya Chakramu
- 1968 Lakshmi Nivasam
- 1968 Ramu
- 1968 Niluvu Dopidi
- 1968 Nindu Samsaram
- 1968 Vintha Kapuram as Anjaneyulu
- 1968 Baghdad Gaja Donga as Hero's friend
- 1969 Sri Rama Katha as Narada
- 1969 Adrushtavanthalu as Jackie
- 1969 Aatmiyulu
- 1969 Jatakaratna Midathambotlu as Midathambotlu
- 1969 Asthulu Anthasthulu
- 1969 Bhale Rangadu
- 1969 Natakala Rayudu as Rajasekhar
- 1969 Buddhimanthudu
- 1969 Kathanayakudu
- 1969 Mooga Nomu
- 1969 Karpura Harathi as Lawyer Venkat
- 1969 Aadarsa Kutumbam
- 1970 Kathanayika Molla as Tenali Ramakrishna
- 1970 Dharma Daata
- 1970 Nirdoshi
- 1970 Akka Chellelu
- 1971 Manasu Mangalyam
- 1971 Pavitra Bandham
- 1971 Adrusta Jathakudu
- 1971 Mattilo Manikyam as Namam, Manikyam's friend
- 1971 Jeevitha Chakram
- 1971 Bhale Papa
- 1971 Dasara Bullodu
- 1971 Sri Krishna Vijayamu
- 1972 Vichitra Bandham as Chittibabu
- 1972 Datta Putrudu
- 1972 Sri Krishna Satya
- 1972 Antha Mana Manchike
- 1973 Bangaru Babu
- 1973 Vaade Veedu
- 1973 Srivaru Maavaru as Paramanand aka Anand
- 1973 Desoddharakulu
- 1973 Dabbuki Lokam Dasoham
- 1973 Jeevana Tarangalu as Anji
- 1973 Manchivadu
- 1973 Ganga Manga
- 1973 Mayadari Malligadu as Balabrahmananda Swamy
- 1974 Chakravakam as Sriram
- 1974 Gundelu Teesina Monagadu
- 1974 Galipatalu as Pandu
- 1974 Tulabharam as Brahmanandam
- 1976 Andharu Bagundali as Chandram
- 1976 Bu as Chillara Donga
- 1976 Iddaru Iddare as Narayya
- 1976 Neram Nadi Kadu Akalidi as Head Constable Meesala Venkata Swamy
- 1976 Maa Daivam
- 1976 Ramarajyamlo Rakthapasam
- 1976 Sri Rajeswari Vilas Coffee Club
- 1976 Bhale Dongalu
- 1976 Soggadu
- 1977 Edureeta
- 1977 Eetharam Manishi as Asthana
- 1977 Indradhanusu
- 1977 Dongalaku Donga as Suri
- 1978 Indradhanussu as 'Kapusaara' Kannayya
- 1978 Agent Gopi as Chitti
- 1979 Dongala Veta
- 1979 Dongalaku Saval as Prasad
- 1979 Maavari Manchitanam
- 1979 Sri Vinayaka Vijayamu as Sandehasura
- 1980 Punnami Naagu
- 1980 Alludu Pattina Bharatam
- 1980 Pelli Gola as Defence Lawyer
- 1981 Premabhishekam
- 1981 Rahasya Goodachari
- 1982 Kalahala Kapuram as Bhayankara Murthy
- 1982 Nijam Chepithe Nerama as Raghavulu
- 1982 Bangaru Koduku as Raju
- 1982 Naa Desam
- 1983 Police Venkataswamy
- 1984 Allulu Vasthunnaru as Basava Raju
- 1984 Danavudu as Hotel Manager
- 1985 Lanchavatharam
- 1985 Kongumudi
- 1985 Siksha
- 1985 Mayaladi as Constable Avatharam
- 1985 Kongumudi as Padma's Maths Teacher
- 1985 Ooriki Soggadu as Principal
- 1985 Intiko Rudramma as Lawyer Krishnamachari
- 1985 Punnami Ratri as K.D. Rayalu
- 1986 Karu Diddina Kapuram
- 1987 Rowdy Babai
- 1987 Viswanatha Nayakudu
- 1987 Dabbevariki Chedu
- 1987 Hanthakudi Veta
- 1987 Samrat as Rangayya
- 1988 Khaidi No. 786
- 1988 Kaliyuga Karnudu as Gumastha of Sarath Chandra Prasad
- 1988 Ugranethrudu as Lawyer Ram Jethmalani
- 1988 Dorakani Donga as Chandasasana Rao
- 1989 Bamma Maata Bangaru Baata
- 1989 Gandipeta Rahasyam
- 1989 Palnati Rudrayya as Simhachalam
- 1991 Mugguru Attala Muddula Alludu
- 1993 Mayalodu as Padmanabham
- 1994 Bhairava Dweepam
- 1995 Subhamasthu
- 1996 Sri Krishnarjuna Vijayam as Purochana
- 1996 Topi Raja Sweety Roja
- 1997 Aashadam Pellikoduku
- 1998 Ganesh
- 1998 Pandaga
- 2004 Mee Intikosthe Emistaaru Maa Intikoste Emi Testaaru
- 2005 Bhadra
- 2005 Chakram
- 2006 Veerabhadra
- 2006 Tata Birla Madhyalo Laila as Padmanabham

=== As producer ===
- 1965 Devata
- 1966 Potti Pleader
- 1967 Sri Sri Sri Maryada Ramanna
- 1969 Sri Rama Katha
- 1970 Kathanayika Molla

=== As director ===
- 1969 Sri Rama Katha
- 1969 Midatam Bottulu
- 1970 Kathanayika Molla
- 1974 Pellikaani Thandri
