= List of Telugu films of 1968 =

This is a list of films produced by the Tollywood film industry based in Hyderabad, India in 1968.

Title	Director	Cast
Aggi Meeda Guggilam	G. Viswanatham	Tadepalli Lakshmi Kanta Rao, Rajasree, Rajanala, Gummadi, Vijayalalitha
Amayakudu	A. Narayanamurthy	Krishna, Jamuna
Attagaru Kotha Kodalu	Sanjeevi	Krishna, Vijaya Nirmala
Baghdad Gaja Donga	D. Yoganand	Padma Shri N. T. Rama Rao, Jayalalithaa
Bandhavyalu	S. V. Ranga Rao	S. V. Ranga Rao, Dhulipala, Savitri
Bandipotu Dongalu	K. S. Prakash Rao	Akkineni Nageswara Rao, Jamuna, Kanchana, S. V. Ranga Rao, Gummadi, Jaggayya
Bangaru Gaajulu	C. S. Rao	Akkineni Nageswara Rao, Bharathi Vishnuvardhan
Bangaru Pichika	Bapu	Chandra Mohan, Vijaya Nirmala
Bangaru Sankellu	Gutha Ramineedu	Haranath, Jamuna
Bhagya Chakramu	K. V. Reddy	N. T. Rama Rao, B. Saroja Devi
Bhale Master	S. D. Lal	N. T. Rama Rao, Kanchana
Bhale Monagadu	B. Vittalacharya	Tadepalli Lakshmi Kanta Rao, Krishna Kumari
Bharya	K. S. Prakash Rao	V. Nagayya, Krishna Kumari, Sobhan Babu, Vanisri, Nagabhushanam
Brahmachari	T. Rama Rao	Akkineni Nageswara Rao, Jayalalithaa
Chinnari Papalu	Savitri	Jaggayya, Sowcar Janaki
Circar Express	M. Krishnan	Krishna, Vijaya Nirmala, Raja Babu, Kottarakkara Sreedharan Nair, Jyothi Lakshmi, Mannava Balayya
Devadichina Bharta	P. Padmaraju	Tadepalli Lakshmi Kanta Rao, Rajasree, Rajanala, Satyanarayana
Devakanya	K. Hemambaradhara Rao	Tadepalli Lakshmi Kanta Rao, Kanchana
Evaru Monagadu	R. Sundaram	Tadepalli Lakshmi Kanta Rao, Sowcar Janaki, Ram Mohan, Rajasree, Chalam, Ramadasu
Govula Gopanna	C. S. Rao	Akkineni Nageswara Rao, Bharathi Vishnuvardhan, Rajasree, Relangi, Suryakantham, Gummadi, C. Lakshmi Rajyam, Chalam, Sukanya
Kalisochina Adrushtam	K. Viswanath	N. T. Rama Rao, Kanchana, Santha Kumari, Dhulipala, Mikkilineni, Satyanarayana, Prabhakar Reddy, Rajababu, Allu Ramalingayya
Kumkuma Barani	Vedantam Raghavayya	Tadepalli Lakshmi Kanta Rao, Anjali Devi, Sobhan Babu, Rajasree, S. V. Ranga Rao, Basavaraju Venkata Padmanabha Rao, Rajanala
Lakshmi Nivasam	V. Madhusudhana Rao	S. V. Ranga Rao, Anjali Devi
Manasamsaram	C. S. Rao	Sobhan Babu, Bharathi Vishnuvardhan, V. Nagayya, Gummadi, Anjali Devi, Chalam, Ramaprabha, Mukkamala, Dhulipala
Manchi Kutumbam	V. Madhusudhana Rao	Akkineni Nageswara Rao, Sowcar Janaki, Padma Bhushan Krishna, Vijaya Nirmala, Chandra Mohan, Vijayasree, Chalam, Geetanjali
Nadamanthrapu Siri	T. Rama Rao	Haranath, Vijaya Nirmala, Nagabhushanam, Suryakantham, Rajanala, Raja Babu
Neerkimi Neervedhaptha Charithra	Narayana Rao	Gummadi, Vijaya Nirmala, Nagabhushanam, Suryakantham, Rajanala, Raja Babu
Nene Monaganni	S. D. Lal	N. T. Rama Rao, Sheela
Nenante Nene	V. Ramachandra Rao	Krishna, Kanchana, Nagabhushanam, Suryakantham, Krishnamraju, Chandra Mohan, Sandhyarani, Sreeranjani, Nellore Kantha Rao, Raavi Kondala Rao, Radha Kumari
Niluvu Dopidi	C. S. Rao	N. T. Rama Rao, Devika, Padma Bhushan Krishna, Jayalalitha, Nagabhushanam, Suryakantham, Rajababu, Basavaraju Venkata Padmanabha Rao, Ramaprabha, Relangi, Hemalatha, Tadepalli Lakshmi Kanta Rao
Nindu Samsaram	C. S. Rao	N. T. Rama Rao, Krishna Kumari
Ninne Pelladata	B. V. Srinivas	N. T. Rama Rao, Bharathi Vishnuvardhan, Suryakantham, Raavi Kondala Rao, Ramana Reddy, Vijayalalitha, Chaya Devi, Kakarala
Paala Manasulu	S. S. R. Sarma	Haranath, Jamuna, Gummadi, Chalam, Raavi Kondala Rao, Mikkilineni, Pandaribai, Ramaprabha, Chaya Devi
Panthaalu Pattimpulu	K. B. Tilak	Sobhan Babu, Geetanjali, Vanisri, Gummadi, Ramana Reddy, Malathi, Ramaprabha
Papa Kosam	G. V. R. Seshagiri Rao	Baby Rani, Devika, Satyanarayana, Tyagaraju, Ramadasu, Basavaraju Venkata Padmanabha Rao, Prabhakar Reddy, Dhulipala, Allu Ramalingayya
Pedaraasi Peddamma Katha	Giduthoori Suryam	Tadepalli Lakshmi Kanta Rao, Krishna Kumari, Ramakrishna, Rajasulochana, Vijayalalitha, Rajanala, Prabhakar Reddy, V. Sivaram
Pelliroju	Manapuram Apparao	Haranath, Jamuna, Relangi, Basavaraju Venkata Padmanabha Rao, Geetanjali, Hemalatha, Pandaribai, Raavi Kondala Rao
Raja Yogam	Subbarama Das	Tadepalli Lakshmi Kanta Rao, Rajasree, Ramakrishna, Geetanjali, Rajanala, Satyanarayana, Raja Babu, Prabhakar Reddy
Ramu	A. C. Trilokchander	N. T. Rama Rao, Jamuna, Master Rajkumar, Pushpalatha, Relangi, Rajanala, Basavaraju Venkata Padmanabha Rao, Geetanjali, Suryakantham, S. V. Ranga Rao, Ramana Reddy, V. Nagayya, Satyanarayana, Rama Das, Perumal
Rana Bheri	Giduthoori Suryam	Tadepalli Lakshmi Kanta Rao, Rajasree, Vanisree, Ramakrishna, Geetanjali, Vijaya Nirmala, Rajanala, Prabhakar Reddy, Raja Babu, Jayakrishna, Dhulipala
Sati Arundhati	K. V. Nandan Rao	Tadepalli Lakshmi Kanta Rao, Jamuna, Anjali Devi, Geetanjali, Gummadi, V. Nagayya
Sudigundaalu	Adurthi Subbarao	Akkineni Nageswara Rao
Sukha Dukhalu	I. N. Murthy	Jayalalithaa, Vanisri, Chandra Mohan
Thalli Prema	Srikanth	N. T. Rama Rao, Savitri
Tikka Sankaraiah	D. Yoganand	N. T. Rama Rao (in dual role), Krishna Kumari, Jayalalithaa
Uma Chandi Gowri Shankarula Katha	K. V. Reddy	N. T. Rama Rao, B. Saroja Devi
Undamma Bottu Pedata	K. Viswanath	Krishna, Jamuna
Veeranjaneya	Kamalakara Kameswara Rao	Kanta Rao, Anjali Devi
