= List of Telugu films of 1969 =

This is a list of films produced by the Tollywood film industry based in Hyderabad in 1969.

Title	Director	Cast
Aadarsa Kutumbam	Kotayya Pratyagatma	Akkineni Nageswara Rao, Jayalalithaa, Anjali Devi
Aatmiyulu	V. Madhusudan Rao	Akkineni Nageshwara Rao, Vanisree, Chandramohan
Adrushtavanthulu	V. Madhusudhana Rao	ANR, Jayalalithaa
Aggi Pidugu	B. Vittalacharya	N. T. Rama Rao, Krishna Kumari, Rajasree
Aggi Veerudu	B. V. Srinivas	N. T. Rama Rao, Rajasree
Ardharathiri	P. Sambasiva Rao	Jaggayya, Bharathi
Bandhipotu Bhimanna	M. Mallikharjuna Rao	Anjali Devi, Krishna, Vijaya Nirmala
Bangaru Panjaram	B. N. Reddy	Shobhan Babu, Vanisri, Sriranjani
Bhale Mastaru	S. D. Lal	Anjali Devi, Kanchana, Krishnamraju
Bhale Rangadu	T. Rama Rao	Akkineni Nageswara Rao, Vanisree, Gummadi
Bhale Thammudu	B. A. Subba Rao	N. T. Rama Rao, K. R. Vijaya
Buddhimantudu	Bapu	Akkineni Nageswara Rao, Vijaya Nirmala, Sobhan Babu, Krishnam Raju
Ekaveera	C. S. Rao	N. T. Rama Rao, K. R. Vijaya
Gandaragandudu	K. S. R. Doss	
Gandikota Rahasyam	B. Vittalacharya	N. T. Rama Rao, Jayalalithaa
Jagath Kiladeelu	I. N. Murthy	Krishna, Vanisri, S. V. Ranga Rao, Gummadi
Kadaladu Vadaladu	B. Vittalacharya	N. T. Rama Rao, Jayalalithaa
Kathanayakudu	K. Hemambaradhara Rao	N. T. Rama Rao, Jayalalithaa
Mamaku Tagga Kodalu	C. S. Rao	
Manchi Mithrulu	T. Rama Rao	Shobhan Babu, Krishna, Gitanjali
Manishichina Maguva	A. Bhim Singh	Savitri
Manushulu Marali	V. Madhusudan Rao	Shoban Babu, Sharada
Mathru Devata	Savitri	N. T. Rama Rao, Savitri
Mooga Nomu	D. Yoganand	A. Nageswara Rao, Jamuna, S. V. Ranga Rao
Natakala Rayudu	K. Sanjeevi	Kaikala Satyanarayana, Kanchana, Nagabhushanam
Nindu Hrudayalu	K. Vishwanath	N. T. Rama Rao, Sobhan Babu, Gudipati Venkatachalam
Poovanam	Shyam Benegal	
Raja Simha	K. Sbharamadas	Vanisree
Sabash Satyam	G. Viswanatham	Krishna, Rajasree
Saptaswaralu	Vedantam Raghavayya	Kanta Rao, Rajasree
Sattekalapu Satteya	K. Balachander	Chalam, Shobhan Babu, S. Varalakshmi
Shri Rama Katha	B. Padmanabham	Anjali Devi, Gummadi, Sharada
Sipayi Chinnayya	G. V. R. Seshagiri Rao	Akkineni Nageswara Rao, K. R. Vijaya, Bharathi Vishnuvardhan
Takkari Donga Chakkani Chukka	K. S. R. Doss	Krishna, Vijaya Nirmala
Ukkupidugu	K. S. R. Doss	
Varakatnam	NTR	NTR, Savitri, Krishna Kumari
Vichitra Kutumbam	K. S. Prakash Rao	N. T. Rama Rao, Savitri
