= Nindu Dampathulu =

- Theatrical release poster
- Directed by: K. Viswanath
- Written by: Samudrala Jr (dialogues)
- Screenplay by: K. Viswanath
- Story by: K. Viswanath
- Produced by: M. Jagannatha Rao
- Starring: N. T. Rama Rao; Savitri; Vijaya Nirmala
- Cinematography: S. S. Lal
- Edited by: B. Gopal Rao
- Music by: T. V. Raju; Vijaya Krishna Murthy
- Production company: S.V.S. Films
- Release date: 4 February 1971
- Running time: 189 mins
- Country: India
- Language: Telugu

Nindu Dampathulu (transl. The Complete Couple) is a 1971 Indian Telugu-language drama film, produced by M. Jagannatha Rao under the S.V.S. Films banner and directed by K. Viswanath. It stars N. T. Rama Rao, Savitri, Vijaya Nirmala and music jointly composed by T. V. Raju & Vijaya Krishna Murthy. A part of the film's plot and scenes are replicated in Swayamkrushi (1987), which was also directed by K. Viswanath.

== Cast ==
- N. T. Rama Rao as Ramu
- Savitri as Sridevi
- Vijaya Nirmala as Subbulu
- Gummadi as Kondala Rao
- Satyanarayana as Gangulu
- Chandra Mohan as Ravi
- Allu Ramalingaiah
- Raja Babu as Kishtaiah
- Dhulipala as Priest
- Mikkilineni as Janaki Ramaiah
- M. Balaiah as Raghu
- Dr. Sivaramakrishnaiah as Seetaiah
- Chalapathi Rao as Doctor
- Lakshmi as Vani
- Chaya Devi as Kanaka Durga
- Rukmini as Rajamma
- Leela Rani as Kamala
- Vijaya Bhanu
- Master Visweswara Rao as Maruti

== Soundtrack ==
Nindu Dampathulu

Film score by T. V. Raju Vijaya Krishna Murthy
- Released: 1971
- Genre: Soundtrack
- Length: 27:58
- Producers: T. V. Raju; Vijaya Krishna Murthy

Music composed by T. V. Raju and Vijaya Krishna Murthy. Lyrics were written by C. Narayana Reddy.

S. No.	Song title	Singers	length
1	"O Shakunthala"	SP Balasubrahmanyam, B. Vasantha	5:50
2	"Malle Poolu"	Ghantasala, P. Susheela	3:29
3	"Kotha Pelli Koothurani"	L. R. Eswari	3:51
4	"Gayde O Gayde"	S. P. Balasubrahmanyam	3:35
5	"Ounantaadu"	P. Susheela	3:46
6	"Neeti Chaatuna"	LR Eswari	3:33
7	"Anaganagaa Okavooru"	S. P. Balasubrahmanyam, P. Leela, Vasantha	3:54
