= Sri Krishnanjaneya Yuddham =

- Theatrical release poster
- Telugu: శ్రీకృష్ణా౦ఙనేయ యుద్ధము
- Directed by: C. S. Rao
- Written by: Samudrala Jr. (dialogues)
- Screenplay by: C. S. Rao
- Story by: Tandra Subramanyam
- Produced by: D. N. Raju
- Starring: N. T. Rama Rao; Devika; Vanisri; S. V. Ranga Rao; Rajanala
- Cinematography: G. K. Ramu
- Edited by: Joshi; Rama Swamy
- Music by: T. V. Raju
- Production company: Poornima Pictures
- Release date: 18 May 1972
- Running time: 170 minutes
- Country: India
- Language: Telugu

Sri Krishnanjaneya Yuddham (transl. War between Krishna and Anjaneya) is a 1972 Indian Telugu-language Hindu mythological film, produced by D. N. Raju and directed by C. S. Rao. It stars N. T. Rama Rao, Devika, Vanisri, S.V. Ranga Rao and Rajanala, with music composed by T. V. Raju.

== Cast ==
- N. T. Rama Rao as Lord Krishna
- Devika as Rukmini
- Vanisri as Sathyabhama
- S. V. Ranga Rao as Balarama
- Kanta Rao as Narada Maharshi
- Rajanala as Lord Hanuman
- Raja Babu as Vasanthaka
- V. Nagayya as Sandipani
- Dhulipala as Yama Dharma Raju
- Mikkilineni as Vasudeva
- Mukkamala as Durvasa
- Arja Janardhan Rao as Garuda
- Tyagaraju as Narakasura
- Santha Kumari as Yashoda
- Hemalatha as Devaki
- Roja Ramani
- Sandhya Rani
- Leela Rani
- Vijaya Bhanu
- Y. Vijaya

== Soundtrack ==
Music composed by T. V. Raju.

S. No.	Song title	Lyrics	Singers	length
1	"Rama Raghurama"	C. Narayana Reddy	Ghantasala	2:55
2	"Neevaina Cheppave"	C. Narayana Reddy	Ghantasala, P. Susheela	3:53
3	"Gopala Krishna Jayaho Balarama"	C. Narayana Reddy	Pithapuram, P. Leela	4:58
4	"Chikkani Gopala Krishnudu"	C. Narayana Reddy	S. Janaki, Vasantha, Sumitra	4:02
5	"Rama Leela"	C. Narayana Reddy	Ghantasala	4:15
6	"Hare Rama Hare Krishna"	C. Narayana Reddy	Ghantasala	1:32
