= Dhanama? Daivama? =

- Theatrical release poster
- Directed by: C. S. Rao
- Written by: Samudrala Jr. Modukuri Johnson (dialogues)
- Produced by: DVS Raju
- Starring: N. T. Rama Rao; Jamuna; Venniradai Nirmala
- Cinematography: G.K.Ramu
- Edited by: B. Gopal Rao
- Music by: T. V. Raju
- Production company: DVS Productions
- Release date: 24 May 1973
- Running time: 162 minutes
- Country: India
- Language: Telugu

Dhanama? Daivama? (transl. Money or God?) is a 1973 Indian Telugu-language drama film, produced by DVS Raju and directed by C. S. Rao. It stars N. T. Rama Rao, Jamuna, Venniradai Nirmala and Chandra Mohan with music composed by T. V. Raju.

== Cast ==
- N. T. Rama Rao as Ramachandra Rao
- Jamuna as Janaki
- Venniradai Nirmala as Radha
- Satyanarayana as Bhupathi
- Padmanabham as Ganapathi
- Allu Ramalingaiah
- Chandra Mohan as Mohan
- Mukkamala as Panchanadham
- Sakshi Ranga Rao
- Malladi as Tata
- Jagga Rao
- Potti Prasad
- P. R. Varalakshmi as Shanti
- Vijaya Bhanu as Vyjayanthi
- Rathna

== Soundtrack ==
Dhanama? Daivama?

Film score by T. V. Raju
- Released: 1973
- Genre: Soundtrack
- Length: 33:49
- Producer: T. V. Raju

Music composed by T. V. Raju. Lyrics were written by C. Narayana Reddy.

S. No.	Song title	Singers	length
1	"Sri Raghavam"	V. Ramakrishna, Jyothi Khanna, P.Susheela	3:48
2	"Kudi Yedamaithe"	Vilas, Pattabhi, Ramola, Kausalya	4:02
3	"Nee Madhi Challagaa"	P. Susheela	2:23
4	"Raaraa Nava Mohana"	P. Susheela, L. R. Eswari	5:21
5	"Kannu Musina"	V. Ramakrishna, P. Susheela, Jyothi Khanna	1:15
6	"Chellemmaa"	V. Ramakrishna	3:41
7	"Yemito Edi"	S. P. Balasubrahmanyam, P. Susheela	3:50
8	"Happy New Year"	L. R. Eswari	3:28
9	"Nee Madhi Challagaa" – 2	P. Susheela	2:10
10	"Naadu Neevu"	V. Ramakrishna, P. Susheela	3:51
