= Chinnanati Snehitulu =

- Theatrical release poster
- Directed by: K. Viswanath
- Written by: Samudrala Jr (dialogues)
- Screenplay by: K. Viswanath
- Story by: K. Viswanath
- Produced by: D. V. S. Raju
- Starring: N. T. Rama Rao; Sobhan Babu; Vanisri
- Cinematography: S.S.Lal
- Edited by: B. Gopala Rao
- Music by: T. V. Raju
- Production company: D.V.S. Productions
- Release date: 6 October 1971
- Running time: 165 mins
- Country: India
- Language: Telugu

Chinnanati Snehitulu (transl. Childhood Friends) is a 1971 Indian Telugu-language drama film, produced by DVS Raju under the DVS Productions banner and directed by K. Viswanath. It stars N. T. Rama Rao, Sobhan Babu and Vanisri, with music composed by T. V. Raju.

== Cast ==
- N. T. Rama Rao as Srinivasa Rao
- Sobhan Babu as Ravi
- Vanisri as Aruna
- Jaggayya as Sridhar Rao
- Devika as Lalitha
- Rajanala as Nagabhushanam
- Raja Babu as Ramababu
- Rao Gopal Rao
- Allu Ramalingaiah as Paanakaalu
- Santha Kumari
- Rama Prabha as Baby
- Pushpa Kumari as Kasthuri

== Soundtrack ==
Chinnanati Snehitulu

Film score by T. V. Raju
- Released: 1971
- Genre: Soundtrack
- Length: 26:50
- Producer: T. V. Raju

Music composed by T. V. Raju. Lyrics were written by C. Narayana Reddy.

S. No.	Song title	Singers	length
1	"Ekkade Ee Gadilone"	Ghantasala, P. Susheela	3:38
2	"Emani Telupanu Ra"	P. Susheela	4:06
3	"Adagalani Vundi"	S. P. Balasubrahmanyam, P. Susheela	3:58
4	"Andala Sreemathiki"	S. P. Balasubrahmanyam, P. Susheela	3:54
5	"Seethamma Talliki Seemantham"	P. Susheela	3:57
6	"Noomula Pandaga"	P. Susheela, Vasantha	3:53
7	"Enukayya Navuutavu"	P. Susheela	3:24
