= Punyamurthula =

Punyamurthula is a Telugu surname. Notable people with the name include:

- Ananth Babu (born Punyamurthula Ananth), Indian film actor and comedian
- Chitti Babu (Telugu actor) (born Punyamurthula Suryanarayana Murthy), Indian film actor and comedian
- Raja Babu (actor) (born Punyamurthula Appalaraju; 1937–1983), Indian film actor and comedian
