= Mikkilineni =

Mikkilineni may refer to:

- 21704 Mikkilineni, a main-belt asteroid
- Mikkilineni (actor), a Telugu film actor and writer
