= Taxi Ramudu =

- Theatrical release poster
- Directed by: V. Madhusudhana Rao
- Written by: Samudrala Jr. (dialogues)
- Screenplay by: V. Madhusudhana Rao
- Produced by: D. V. K. Raju; K. N. Raju; K. Ramachandra Raju; C. S. Raju
- Starring: Jaggayya; N.T.Ramarao; Devika
- Cinematography: C. Nageswara Rao
- Edited by: N. S. Prakasam
- Music by: T. V. Raju
- Production company: Sri Ramakrishna Productions
- Release date: 18 October 1961
- Running time: 153 minutes
- Country: India
- Language: Telugu

Taxi Ramudu is a 1961 Indian Telugu-language drama film, produced by D. V. K. Raju, K. N. Raju, K. Ramachandra Raju and C. S. Raju under the Sri Ramakrishna Productions banner and directed by V. Madhusudhana Rao. It stars N.T.Ramarao, Jaggayya, Devika and music composed by T. V. Raju.

== Cast ==
- Jaggayya as Mohan
- Devika as Saroja
- N.T.Ramaraoas Ramudu
- Rajanala as Nagu
- Relangi as Jambulingam
- Gummadi as Janardhan Rao
- Chadalavada as Mallaiah
- K.V.S.Sarma as Ramaiah
- Girija as Alivelu
- Rushyendramani as Saroja's mother
- Chaya Devi as Andallu
- Ragini as Mohini

== Soundtrack ==
Taxi Ramudu

Film score by T. V. Raju
- Released: 1961
- Recorded: 25:42
- Genre: Soundtrack
- Producer: T. V. Raju

Music composed by T. V. Raju.

S. No	Song title	Lyrics	Singers	length
1	"Vannela Chinnela"	Samudrala Jr.	Ghantasala	3:54
2	"Yemiti Kavalo"	Aarudhra	S. Janaki	3:41
3	"Raavoyi Manasaina"	Malladi Ramakrishna Sastry	Ghantasala, P. Susheela	3:56
4	"Sokinchakoyi"	Samudrala Sr.	Ghantasala	3:11
5	"Gopalabala Kaapada"	Vempati Sadasivabrahmam	P. Susheela	3:03
6	"Manalao Mata"	Aarudhra	P. Susheela	3:41
7	"Mamaiah Tirunaalaku"	Kosaraju	Pithapuram, S. Janaki	3:15
8	"Pathiphalam"	Aarudhra	Ghantasala	1:01
