= Bhale Thammudu =

Bhale Thammudu may refer to:

- Bhale Thammudu (1969 film), an Indian Telugu-language action crime film
- Bhale Thammudu (1985 film), an Indian Telugu-language action drama film
- Bhale Thammudu, working title of Tadakha, a 2013 Indian Telugu-language action film
