= T. V. Raju =

Indian film score composer (1921–1973)

- Born: Thotakura Venkata Raju; 25 October 1921
- Died: 20 February 1973 (aged 51)
- Occupation: Music composer

Thotakura Venkata Raju (25 October 1921 – 20 February 1973), popularly known as T. V. Raju, was an Indian music composer who predominantly worked in Telugu cinema. Known for his versatility and significant contributions to both mythological and social drama films, Raju established himself as one of the leading music directors of his time.

He worked as an assistant composer to P. Adinarayana Rao in the film Palletoori Pilla (1950). He acted in a minor role in the same film. His debut film as independent music director was Tingu Ranga (1952), directed by B. A. Subba Rao. His music in the films Panduranga Mahatyam (1957), Sri Krishna Pandaveeyam (1966) and Sri Krishnavataram (1967) is memorable. Raju also proved his mettle as versatile music composer in social drama genre movies similar to the 1961 film Taxi Ramudu. Satyam assisted him for many films. His association with "NAT Combines" production house, N. T. Rama Rao films yielded many hits. He even composed music for a song for Mohammed Rafi for the 1969 film Bhale Thammudu.

== Early life ==
Totakura Venkata Raju was born on 25 October 1921 in Raghudevapuram near Rajahmundry in Andhra Pradesh. Raju displayed an early interest in music. Coming from a family with a strong inclination toward the arts, he pursued his musical training in Rajahmundry before moving to Madras (now Chennai) to establish a career in the film industry.

== Career ==
In Madras, Raju worked as an assistant to leading music directors of the time. He shared living space with N. T. Rama Rao, Tatineni Prakash Rao, and M. A. Rahman, all of whom were aspiring to make their mark in cinema. Raju's first major opportunity came when he worked as an associate music director for the film Palleturi Pilla (1950), composed by Adinarayana Rao.

T. V. Raju's first break as a full-fledged music composer came with the film Tinguranga, produced by B. A. Subba Rao. His long-standing collaboration with N. T. Rama Rao began with the film Pichi Pullayya, produced under the National Art Theatre (NAT) banner. This partnership grew stronger with Raju composing music for numerous films featuring Rama Rao, including Todudongalu and Jayasimha (1955). The success of Jayasimha marked a turning point in Raju's career, cementing his position as a leading music director.

Raju's work is especially remembered for the music in films like Panduranga Mahatyam (1957), Sri Krishna Pandaveeyam (1966), and Sri Krishnavataram (1967), which remain classics in Telugu cinema. He also showcased his talent in social dramas, with films like Taxi Ramudu (1961). His ability to blend classical and contemporary music made him a versatile composer.

One of Raju's notable achievements was bringing renowned Bollywood playback singer Mohammed Rafi to sing for the Telugu film Bhale Thammudu (1969), further cementing his influence in the industry. Music director Satyam worked as his assistant for many films, contributing to his success.

T. V. Raju composed music for over 60 films in Telugu, Tamil, and Kannada, with a significant number of them starring N. T. Rama Rao. Some of his notable films with NTR include Panduranga Mahatyam, Rajanandini, Rechukka Pagatichukka, Indrajit, Taxi Ramudu, Savati Koduku, Mangamma Sapatham, Sri Krishna Pandaveeyam, Pidugu Ramudu, Ummadi Kutumbam, Sri Krishnavataram, Bhale Thammudu, Baghdad Gajadonga, and Kathanayakudu.

Raju's compositions for Rama Rao's productions, including films like Srimad Virat Veerabrahmendra Swamy Charitra and Bhale Thammudu, were highly successful and showcased his versatility as a composer. He was known for blending northern Indian musical styles with his own distinct touch, creating memorable melodies that resonated with audiences.

In addition to his work as a composer, Raju also appeared in small roles in films, such as a spy in Palleturi Pilla (1950) and a devotee in the song "Krishna Mukunda Murari" from Panduranga Mahatyam (1957).

=== Notable Songs ===
Some of the most memorable songs composed by T. V. Raju include "E Nati Ee Haayi," "Jayakrishna Mukunda Murari" from Panduranga Mahatyam, "Swagatam Suswagatam" from Sri Krishna Pandaveeyam, "Nee Charana Kamalalu" from Sri Krishnavataram, "Telugu Jaati Manadi" from Talla Pellama, and "Neeti Dharmamu" from Kodalu Diddina Kaapuram. These songs continue to be cherished by Telugu music lovers.

== Legacy ==
T. V. Raju's contribution to Telugu cinema remains unparalleled, particularly for his collaboration with N. T. Rama Rao, for whom he composed music for around 38 films. Despite his success, Raju maintained close ties with his mentor, Adinarayana Rao, and even worked as an associate composer on Suvarna Sundari, a film scored by Adinarayana Rao.

Raju's family continued his musical legacy, with his son Venkata Satyasuryanarayana Raju working as a guitarist in the film industry, and another son, Somaraju, being part of the famous music duo Raj–Koti. T. V. Raju's music is still celebrated today for its unique blend of traditional and contemporary styles.

== Personal life ==
In his personal life, Raju married Savitri, and the couple had two sons. Their elder son, Venkata Satya Suryanarayana Raju, became a guitarist, while their younger son, Thotakura Somaraju, better known as Raj from the composer duo Raj–Koti, achieved fame as a music director in Telugu cinema.

T. V. Raju had a close friendship with N. T. Rama Rao, with whom he shared living quarters during their early struggles in the film industry.

Thotakura Venkata Raju (25 October 1921 – 20 February 1973), popularly known as T. V. Raju, was an Indian music composer who predominantly worked in Telugu cinema. He died on 20 February 1973 at the age of 51. Raju was known for his contributions to both the mythological and social drama genres, establishing himself as a prominent music director of his era. [1]

== Filmography ==
Year	Film	Language	Director	Banner	Co-Music Directors
1952	Shyamala	Tamil	B. A. Subba Rao	Yuva Pictures	G. Ramanathan & S. B. Thinakar Rao
1952	Tingu Ranga	Telugu	B. A. Subba Rao	Yuva Pictures	
1953	Pichi Pullayya	Telugu	T. Prakash Rao	National Art Theatre	
1954	Thodu Dongalu	Telugu	D. Yoganand	National Art Theatre	
1954	Nirupedalu	Telugu	T. Prakash Rao	Gokul Pictures	
1955	Aada Bidda	Telugu	Erra Apparao	Sri VSV Films	B. Gopalam
1955	Jayasimha	Telugu	D. Yoganand	National Art Theatre	
1955	Jayasimman	Tamil	D. Yoganand	National Art Theatre	
1956	Chintamani	Telugu	P. S. Ramakrishna Rao	Bharani Pictures	Addepalli Rama Rao
1956	Sri Gauri Mahatyam	Telugu	D. Yoganand	Mahi Productions	Ogirala Ramachandra Rao
1956	Mangala Gowri	Tamil	D. Yoganand	Mahi Productions	Ogirala Ramachandra Rao
1957	Panduranga Mahatyam	Telugu	Kamalakara Kameswara Rao	National Art Theatre	
1958	Raja Nandini	Telugu	Vedantam Raghavayya	Jalaruha Productions	
1958	Sri Krishna Maya	Telugu	C. S. Rao	Sri Raja Rajeswari Film Company	
1959	Goppinti Ammayi	Telugu	A. Bhimsingh	National Productions	
1959	Annaiyum Pithavum Munnari Dheivam	Tamil	Kamalakara Kameswara Rao	National Art Theatre	
1959	Bala Nagamma	Telugu	V. Madhusudhana Rao	Sri Venkata Ramana Pictures	
1959	Raja Sevai	Tamil	Kamalakara Kameswara Rao	Swastisri Pictures	
1959	Rechukka Pagatichukka	Telugu	Kamalakara Kameswara Rao	Swastisri Pictures	
1961	Jagadeka Sundari	Telugu	Shantilal Soni	Rupak Movies	
1961	Rushyasrunga	Telugu	Mukkamala	Geetha Pictures	
1961	Taxi Ramudu	Telugu	R. M. Krishnaswami	Sri Ramakrishna Productions	
1961	Sati Sulochana	Telugu	S. Rajinikanth	Srikanth Productions	
1963	Savati Koduku	Telugu	Y. Ranga Rao	Naveena Chitra	Satyam
1964	Aadarsa Sodarulu	Telugu	A. Bhimsingh	Santhi Films	
1964	Neethi - Nijayathi	Telugu	T. S. Rama Rao	Pasumarthi Pictures	
1964	Rishyasringar	Tamil	Mukkamala	Geetha Pictures	
1965	Adhrusya Hanthakudu	Telugu	A. S. A. Sami	Rajendran Pictures	K. V. Mahadevan
1965	Gharana Hanthakudu	Telugu	M. Natesan	Natesh Art Pictures	
1965	Mangamma Sapatham	Telugu	B. Vittalacharya	D.V.S. Productions	
1965	Sri Simhachala Kshetra Mahima	Telugu	B. V. Prasad	Sri Saraswati Movies	
1965	Visala Hrudayalu	Telugu	B. S. Narayana	Gokul Art Pictures	
1966	Pidugu Ramudu	Telugu	B. Vittalacharya	D.V.S. Productions	
1966	Bhimanjaneya Yuddham	Telugu	S. D. Lal	Mahalakshmi Movies	
1966	Sri Krishna Pandaveeyam	Telugu	N. T. Rama Rao	NAT & Ramakrishna Cine Studios	
1967	Bhama Vijayam	Telugu	C. Pullaiah	Shekar Films	
1967	Chadarangam	Telugu	S. V. Ranga Rao	SVR Films	
1967	Chikkadu Dorakadu	Telugu	B. Vittalacharya	Sri Lakshmi Narayana Productions	
1967	Kambojaraju Katha	Telugu	Kamalakara Kameswara Rao	Anantalakshmi Productions	
1967	Nindu Manasulu	Telugu	S. D. Lal	S.V.S. Films	
1967	Pinni	Telugu	B. A. Subba Rao	Srikanth Productions	
1967	Shabhash Ranga	Telugu	M. A. Thirumugam	Thevar Films	K. V. Mahadevan
1967	Sri Krishnavataram	Telugu	Kamalakara Kameswara Rao	Taraka Rama Pictures	
1967	Ummadi Kutumbam	Telugu	D. Yoganand	NAT & Ramakrishna Cine Studios	
1968	Anubhavinchu Raja Anubhavinchu	Telugu	K. Balachander	Ayya Films	M. S. Viswanathan
1968	Baghdad Gaja Donga	Telugu	D. Yoganand	Padma Gowri Pictures	
1968	Coimbathuru Khaidhi	Telugu	G. Ramakrishnan	New India Productions	K. V. Mahadevan
1968	Devakanya	Telugu	K. Hemambharadhara Rao	Sri Chaya Chitra	
1968	Kalisochina Adrushtam	Telugu	K. Viswanath	S.V.S. Films	
1968	Manasamsaram	Telugu	C. S. Rao	Srikanth Productions	
1968	Nene Monaganni	Telugu	S. D. Lal	Prathima Films	
1968	Tikka Sankarayya	Telugu	D. Yoganand	D.V.S. Productions	
1969	Bandhipotu Bhimanna	Telugu	M. Mallikharjuna Rao	Bhaskar Pictures	
1969	Bhale Mastaru	Telugu	S. D. Lal	Vijayagiri Dhwaja Productions	
1969	Bhale Thammudu	Telugu	B. A. Subba Rao	Tarakarama Pictures	
1969	Chikkamma	Kannada	R. Sampath	S.V.S. Films	
1969	Gandikota Rahasyam	Telugu	B. Vittalacharya	D.V.S. Productions	
1969	Goa CID 999	Telugu	Dorai–Bhagavan	Golden Studio	G. K. Venkatesh
1969	Karpoora Harathi	Telugu	V. Ramachandra Rao	Srikanth Productions	
1969	Kadaladu Vadaladu	Telugu	B. Vittalacharya	Sri Lakshmi Narayana Combines	
1969	Kathanayakudu	Telugu	K. Hemambaradhara Rao	Gopala Krishna Productions	
1969	Nindu Hrudayalu	Telugu	K. Viswanath	S. V. S. Films	
1969	Saptaswaralu	Telugu	Vedantam Raghavayya	Hema Films	
1969	Tara Sasankam	Telugu	Manapuram Appa Rao	Ramakrishna Pictures	
1969	Varakatnam	Telugu	N. T. Rama Rao	Ramakrishna & NAT Combines	
1969	Vichitra Kutumbam	Telugu	K. S. Prakash Rao	Sriraj Art Films	
1970	Kodalu Diddina Kapuram	Telugu	D. Yoganand	NAT & Ramakrishna Cine Studios	
1970	Marina Manishi	Telugu	C. S. Rao	Srikanth Productions	
1970	Khadga Veera	Telugu	G. Vishwanath	Sri Vijayarani Combines	
1970	Raithe Raju	Telugu	B. Vittalacharya	Sri Swarajyalakshmi Productions	
1970	Thalla? Pellama?	Telugu	N. T. Rama Rao	NAT & Ramakrishna Cine Studios	
1971	Bhagyavanthudu	Telugu	C. S. Rao	Sagar Films	
1971	Chinnanati Snehitulu	Telugu	K. Viswanath	D.V.S. Productions	
1971	Nindu Dampathulu	Telugu	K. Viswanath	S.V.S. Films	Vijaya Krishna Murthy
1972	Kanimuthu Paappa	Tamil	S. P. Muthuraman	Sri Navaneedha Films	
1972	Raj Mahal	Telugu	B. Harinarayana	Harikrishna Films	
1972	Rani Yaar Kuzhanthai	Tamil	D. Yoganand	Jupiter Art Pictures	
1972	Sri Krishnanjaneya Yuddham	Telugu	C. S. Rao	Poornima Pictures	
1973	Bullebbayi Pelli	Telugu	K. Krishna Murthy	D.V.S. Productions	
1973	Dhanama? Daivama?	Telugu	C. S. Rao	D.V.S. Productions	
1974	Manushullo Devudu	Telugu	B. V. Prasad	Sri Bhaskara Chitra	S. Hanumantha Rao
