= Sri Krishna Maya =

- Theatrical release poster
- Directed by: C. S. Rao
- Written by: Ravuru (dialogues)
- Screenplay by: C. S. Rao
- Story by: Varanasi Seetarama Sastry
- Based on: Narada Samsaram (drama)
- Produced by: K. B. Nagabhushanam
- Starring: Akkineni Nageswara Rao; Jamuna
- Cinematography: Kamal Ghosh
- Edited by: N. K. Gopal
- Music by: T. V. Raju
- Production company: Sri Raja Rajeswari Film Company
- Distributed by: Chamriya Film distributors
- Release date: 12 June 1958
- Running time: 167 minutes
- Country: India
- Language: Telugu

Sri Krishna Maya (transl. Illusion of Lord Krishna) is a 1958 Indian Telugu-language Hindu mythological film, produced by K. B. Nagabhushanam under the Sri Raja Rajeswari Film Company banner and directed by C. S. Rao. It stars Akkineni Nageswara Rao, Jamuna and music composed by T. V. Raju. The film is based on Varanasi Seetarama Sastry's Narada Samsaram (drama).

The film was dubbed as Tamil movie Naradar Kalyanam which was released in 1959. K. Devanarayanan and G. S. Manian wrote the dialogues. The music was composed by M. Ranga Rao while the lyrics were penned by Papanasam Sivan, Thanjai N. Ramaiah Dass, Kuyilan and K. Devanarayanan.

== Cast ==
- Akkineni Nageswara Rao as Narada Maharshi
- Jamuna as Maya
- Rajanala as Indra
- Raghu Ramaiah as Lord Krishna
- Dr. Sivaramakrishnaiah as Peeraiah
- Chadalavada as Vasanthaka / Santha
- Vangara
- K. V. S. Sarma as Lord Brahma
- A. V. Subba Rao as Rudrama Dora
- Nalla Ram Murthy as Gunachari
- Suryakantam as Nalini / Nalli
- Chhaya Devi as Durgamma
- Malathi as Goddess Saraswati
- E. V. Saroja as Dancer
- Rita as Mohini
- Suryakala as Satyabhama

== Soundtrack ==
Sri Krishna Maya

Film score by T. V. Raju
- Released: 1958
- Genre: Soundtrack
- Length: 26:56
- Producer: T. V. Raju

Music composed by T. V. Raju. Music released on Audio Company.

S. No.	Song title	Lyrics	Singers	length
1	"Chiluka Elane Kopamu"	Ravuri	Ghantasala, Jikki	3:42
2	"Jaya Sundara Nanda Bala"	Ravuru	Ghantasala	2:19
3	"Mukti Margamunu Kanaleva"	Ravuru	Ghantasala	2:51
4	"Harikatha"	Varanasi Seetarama Sastry	Ghantasala	6:29
5	"Naa Vayasu Naa Sogasu"	Ravuru	Jikki	2:41
6	"Nidurinchavayya"	B. V. S. Acharya	Ghantasala	3:14
7	"Tarame Jagaana"	Ravuru	Raghuramaiah	1:44
8	"Vayyari Nannu Cheri"	Ravuru	Madhavapeddi Satyam, S. Janaki	2:02
9	"Neelavarna Nee Leelalu Teliya"	Ravuru	Ghantasala	1:54

== Remake ==
It was remade in Hindi as Narad Leela in 1972 starring Shahu Modak.
