= Kalisochina Adrushtam =

1968 film directed by K. Viswanath

- Theatrical release poster
- Directed by: K. Viswanath
- Screenplay by: K. Viswanath
- Story by: Pinishetty
- Produced by: M. Jagannatha Rao
- Starring: N. T. Rama Rao; Kanchana
- Cinematography: K. S. Ramakrishna
- Edited by: B. Gopal Rao
- Music by: T. V. Raju
- Production company: S.V.S. Films
- Release date: 10 August 1968
- Running time: 170 minutes
- Country: India
- Language: Telugu

Kalisochina Adrushtam (transl. Got a Huge Luck) is a 1968 Indian Telugu-language drama film, produced by M. Jagannatha Rao under the S.V.S. Films banner and directed by K. Viswanath. It stars N. T. Rama Rao, Kanchana and music composed by T. V. Raju.

== Plot ==
The film begins with Rao Bahadur Raghavendra Rao's train journey with his pregnant wife. Due to the labor, he admits her to a remote area hospital, where she dies with the baby. At the same, a destitute Parvatamma delivers a boy and attempts suicide because of poverty. Discerning it, Rao Bahadur adopts the child Prakash when Parvatamma bestows him a locket. Years roll by, and Prakash grows as a fair upright who crushes his colleague, Sobha. Once, Prakash visited their village, where Sobha's father, Panakalu, was a vindictive loan shark and tyrant. Fortuitously, Parvatamma resides therein with her elder Ranga and younger Gauri, who detects Prakash by the chain. Ranga is a trippier loaf knitted to benevolent Lakshmi. In a glimpse, Ganapati, the son of Panakalu, loves Gauri. Rao Bahadur is ailing all at once, leading Prakash to rush when Parvatamma is behind. Until then, Rao Bahadur dies when Prakash feels fishy and is on cloud nine to divulge the actuality through his true-blue Ramayya. Forthwith, Prakash recoups his family, which begrudges Panakalu. Then, Prakash's hinky manager Bhujanga Rao clutches Ranga. It is excessive for the fortunate family, and Ranga makes a tight spot. Ergo, Prakash abandons the totality to Ranga and exits with his mother & sister, shifting to the village. Hence, Panakalu denies his daughter's marital to Prakash, yet Sobha stands firm. Following, he spots & relieves peasants from the heinous claws of Panakalu and executes perfect husbandry. Besides, Ranga necks out Lakshmi via divorce with hoodwink and ploys to splice Sobha by entrapping Panakalu. At last, Prakash teaches his brother & Panakalu a lesson in the disguised form of Sardarji and reunites the family. Finally, the movie ends happily with the marriage of Prakash & Sobha.

== Cast ==
- N. T. Rama Rao as Prakash
- Kanchana as Sobha
- Satyanarayana as Ranga
- Prabhakar Reddy as Bhujangam
- Raja Babu as Ganapathi
- Allu Ramalingaiah
- Mikkilineni
- Dhulipala as Paanakalu
- Santha Kumari as Parvatamma
- Geetanjali
- Vijaya Lalitha as item number
- Sandhya Rani as Gauri
- Sukanya as Lakshmi

== Soundtrack ==
Kalisochina Adrushtam

Film score by T. V. Raju
- Released: 1968
- Genre: Soundtrack
- Length: 30:54
- Producer: T. V. Raju

Music composed by T. V. Raju.

| S. No. | Song title | Lyrics | Singers | length |
|---|---|---|---|---|
| 1 | "Vandhanaalu" | C. Narayana Reddy | Ghantasala, P.Susheela, Madhavapeddi Satyam | 4:53 |
| 2 | "Pachchaa Pachchaani" | C. Narayana Reddy | Ghantasala, P. Susheela | 4:00 |
| 3 | "Amma Nuvve Naa Amma" | C. Narayana Reddy | Ghantasala | 2:50 |
| 4 | "Thaapam Thaapam" | C. Narayana Reddy | Pithapuram, K. Jamuna Rani | 3:10 |
| 5 | "Ninnu Choodandhi" | Kosaraju | L. R. Eswari | 5:05 |
| 6 | "Pattandee Naagali" | C. Narayana Reddy | Ghantasala, L. R. Eswari | 4:05 |
| 7 | "Antha Kopamaa" | C. Narayana Reddy | Ghantasala, L. R. Eswari | 3:26 |
| 8 | "Ee Prema" | C. Narayana Reddy | Ghantasala, L. R. Eswari | 3:25 |
