= Gandikota Rahasyam =

1969 film directed by B. Vittalacharya

- Theatrical release poster
- Directed by: B. Vittalacharya
- Written by: G.K.Murthy (story / dialogues)
- Screenplay by: B. Vittalacharya
- Produced by: D. V. S. Raju
- Starring: N. T. Rama Rao; Jayalalithaa
- Cinematography: S. S. Lal
- Edited by: K. Govinda Swamy
- Music by: T. V. Raju
- Production company: D.V.S. Productions
- Release date: 1 May 1969
- Running time: 173 mins
- Country: India
- Language: Telugu

Gandikota Rahasyam (transl. Secret of Gandikota) is a 1969 Telugu-language film co-written and directed by B. Vittalacharya. It stars N. T. Rama Rao, Jayalalithaa with music composed by T. V. Raju. The film was produced by D. V. S. Raju under the DVS Productions banner. The film was dubbed in Hindi as Baghavat. It is remake of Tamil movie Nadodi Mannan (1958).

== Cast ==
- N. T. Rama Rao as Raja & Jayanth (dual role)
- Jayalalithaa as Radha
- Rajanala as Pratapa Rudrudu
- Mikkilineni as Maha Mantri
- Raja Babu as Vajralu
- Allu Ramalingaiah as Avadhani
- Prabhakar Reddy as Dalapathi
- Dr. Sivaramakraishnaiah
- Tyagaraju as Bhusaiah
- Raavi Kondala Rao as Kanakaiah
- Sarathi as Timmaiah
- Jagga Rao
- Devika as Lalitha Devi
- Hemalatha as Raja Maata Hymavathi Devi
- Rama Prabha as Subbulu
- T. G. Kamala Devi as complainant in the king's court
- Nalla Ramamurthy

== Soundtrack ==
Gandikota Rahasyam

Film score by T. V. Raju
- Released: 1969
- Genre: Soundtrack
- Producer: T. V. Raju

Music composed by T. V. Raju.

S. No.	Song title	Lyrics	Singers	length
1	"Kanneloy Kannelu"	C. Narayana Reddy	P. Susheela, L. R. Eswari	4:12
2	"Maradala Pillaa"	C. Narayana Reddy	Ghantasala	3:40
3	"Thelisindhi Thelisindhi"	C. Narayana Reddy	Ghantasala, P. Susheela	3:33
4	"Padana Padanaa"	C. Narayana Reddy	P. Susheela	4:42
5	"Neelaala Ningi"	C. Narayana Reddy	P. Susheela, Ghantasala	4:03
6	"Thagulukunte"	Kosaraju	Pithapuram, L. R. Eswari	3:07
7	"Lahiri Lahiri Lahiri"	Kosaraju	P. Susheela	3:57
