= Nindu Hrudayalu =

- Theatrical release poster
- Directed by: K. Viswanath
- Written by: Samudrala Jr. (dialogues)
- Screenplay by: K. Viswanath
- Story by: Nagercoil Padmanabhan
- Produced by: M. Jagannatha Rao
- Starring: N. T. Rama Rao; Sobhan Babu; Vanisri
- Cinematography: S. S. Lal
- Edited by: B. Gopala Rao
- Music by: T. V. Raju
- Production company: S. V. S. Films
- Release date: August 15, 1969
- Running time: 188 mins
- Country: India
- Language: Telugu

Nindu Hrudayalu (transl. Whole Hearts) is 1969 Telugu-language action drama film, produced by M. Jagannatha Rao for S.V.S. Films, directed by K. Viswanath. It stars N. T. Rama Rao, Sobhan Babu, Vanisri with music by T. V. Raju. This film was K. Viswanath's breakthrough work.

== Cast ==
- N. T. Rama Rao as Gopi
- Vanisri as Sharada
- Shobhan Babu as Ramu / Chitti Babu
- Satyanarayana as Veeraju / Raja Shekaram
- Allu Ramalingaiah as Govindaiah
- Chalam as Maruti
- Relangi as Prasad
- Mikkilineni as Police Constable Rangaiah
- Tyagaraju as Sridhar Rao
- Geethanjali as Lalitha
- Chandrakala as Geetha
- Rukmini as Janaki
- Chaya Devi as Anasuya
- Mohini as Kamini Devi
- Master Visweswara Rao as young Maruti

== Soundtrack ==
Nindu Hrudayalu

Film score by T. V. Raju
- Released: 1969
- Genre: Soundtrack
- Producer: T. V. Raju

Music composed by T. V. Raju.

S. No.	Song title	Lyrics	Singers	length
1	"Okkate Rendu Muudu"	C. Narayana Reddy	Ghantasala, P. Susheela, K. Jamuna Rani, Vasantha	03:39
2	"Le Priya"	C. Narayana Reddy	P. Susheela	03:38
3	"Metha Methani Sogasu"	C. Narayana Reddy	S. P. Balasubrahmanyam, L. R. Eswari, Jamuna Rani, Pattabhi	04:45
4	"Em Champala Niggulu"	C. Narayana Reddy	P. Susheela, Ghantasala	03:19
5	"Chilaka O Ramachilaka"	Samudrala Jr.,	Pattabhi, Vasantha	02:41
6	"Neeve Madana Devuni"	Devulapalli	P. Susheela, Jamuna Rani	05:37
7	"Adamlanti Chekili Choosi"	C. Narayana Reddy	P. Susheela, Ghantasala	04:35
8	"Rama Laali Megha Shyama Laali"	C. Narayana Reddy	P. Susheela	03:18
9	"Okkate Rendu Muudu" (Pathos)	C. Narayana Reddy	Ghantasala	02:14
