= Visweswara Rao =

Indian actor

- Born: Garimella Visweswara Rao; 30 May 1959
- Died: 3 April 2024 (aged 64)
- Other name: Vichu (in Tamil)
- Occupation: Actor
- Years active: 1966-1975 (child actor); 1994-2024
- Notable work: Pithamagan (2003)

Visweswara Rao was an Indian actor who worked in Telugu films apart from a few Tamil films.

== Personal life and career ==
Originally from Kakinada, he moved to Chennai and pursued a career in films. He started out as a comedic child artist and starred in Telugu films such as Bala Bharatam (1972). As he became an adult, he received less opportunities and played minor roles in several films barring the Tamil film Pithamagan (2003) where he played Laila's father before starting his YouTube channel Vissu Talkies. He died in 2024 at the age of 64 in Chennai due to cancer.

== Filmography ==
=== Telugu films ===
- Potti Pleader (1966)
- Sri Rama Katha (1969)
- Mooga Nomu (1969)
- Kadaladu Vadaladu (1969)
- Nindu Hrudayalu (1969)
- Dharma Patani (1969)
- Mathru Devata (1969)
- Maa Nanna Nirdoshi (1970)
- Paga Sadhistha (1970)
- Dharma Daata (1970)
- Thalli Thandralu (1970)
- Inti Gowravam (1970)
- Balaraju Katha (1970)
- Nindu Dampathulu (1971)
- Sisindri Chittibabu (1971)
- Pattindalla Bangaram (1971)
- Bharya Biddalu (1972)
- Monagadosthunnadu Jagratha (1972)
- Bala Bharatam (1972)
- Shanti Nilayam (1972)
- Kanna Thalli (1972)
- Papam Pasivadu (1972)
- Oka Naari Vandha Thupakulu (1973)
- Kanna Koduku (1973)
- Devi Lalithamba (1973)
- Varasuralu (1973)
- Abimanavanthulu (1973)
- Sthree (1973)
- Aajanma Brahmachari (1973)
- Neramu Siksha (1973)
- Andala Ramudu (1973)
- Peddalu Marali (1974)
- Intinti Katha (1974)
- Vaikuntapali (1974)
- Bhagasthulu (1975)
- Manassakshi (1975)
- Raktha Sambandhalu (1975)
- Kathanayakuni Katha (1975)
- President Gari Pellam (1992)
- Vintha Kodallu (1993)
- Allari Alludu (1993)
- Bhairava Dweepam (1994)
- Srivari Priyuralu (1994)
- Parugo Parugu (1994)
- Criminal (1994)
- Aayanaki Iddaru (1995)
- Maatho Pettukoku (1995)
- Desa Drohulu (1995)
- Rikshavodu (1995)
- Pelli Sandadi (1996)
- Sahasa Veerudu Sagara Kanya (1996)
- Maa Aavida Collector (1996)
- Akkada Ammayi Ikkada Abbayi (1996)
- Ratra Yatra (1997)
- Mama Bagunnava (1997)
- Super Heroes (1997)
- Devudu (1997)
- Aavida Maa Aavide (1998)
- Nuvvu Vastavani (2000)
- Durga (2000)
- Naalo Unna Prema (2001)
- Cheppave Chirugali (2004)
- Kithakithalu (2006)
- Astram (2006)
- Maharathi (2007)
- Nava Vasantham (2007)
- Bommana Brothers Chandana Sisters (2008)
- Kathanayakudu (2008)
- Mee Sreyobhilashi (2010)
- Brahmi Gadi Katha (2011)
- Friends Book (2012)
- Janda Pai Kapiraju (2015)
- Jai Simha (2018)

=== Tamil films ===
- Jolly (1998)
- Vaanathaipola (2000)
- Unnai Ninaithu (2002)
- Pithamagan (2003)
- Gajendra (2004)
- Sivakasi (2005)
- Unakkum Enakkum (2006)
- E (2006)
- Evano Oruvan (2007)
- Jayamkondaan (2008)
- Theeradha Vilaiyattu Pillai (2010)
- Thambikku Indha Ooru (2010; uncredited)
- Thillalangadi (2010)
- Kazhugu (2012)
- Vathikuchi (2013)
- Kantha (2013)
- Tamilselvanum Thaniyar Anjalum (2016)
- Mudinja Ivana Pudi (2016)
- Maanagaram (2017)

=== Other language films ===
- Criminal (1995; Hindi)
- Kotigobba 2 (2016; Kannada)

=== Television ===
- Oka Stree Katha (AVM Productions) (2000)
- Manasu Mamata (2011-2021)
- Uppena (2022)
- Thendral Vanthu Ennai Thodum (2021-2023) (Vijay TV)
