= Nirupedalu =

- Theatrical release poster
- Directed by: T. Prakash Rao
- Written by: Anisetty (dialogues)
- Screenplay by: T. Prakash Rao
- Story by: K. Pratyagatma
- Produced by: Donepudi Krushna Murthy
- Starring: Akkineni Nageswara Rao; Jamuna
- Cinematography: B. S. Ranga
- Edited by: G. D. Joshi
- Music by: T. V. Raju
- Production company: Gokul Pictures
- Distributed by: Chamriya Film distributors
- Release date: 2 March 1954
- Country: India
- Language: Telugu

Nirupedalu (transl. Destitute) is a 1954 Indian Telugu-language drama film, produced by Donepudi Krushna Murthy under the Gokul Pictures banner and directed by T. Prakash Rao. It stars Akkineni Nageswara Rao, Jamuna, with music composed by T. V. Raju.

== Cast ==
- Akkineni Nageswara Rao as Narayana
- Jamuna
- Ramana Reddy
- Surabhi Balasaraswathi
- R. Nageswara Rao as Dharmayya
- Chadalavada as Ranganna
- Master Krishna Murthy as Ramu

== Crew ==
- Art: N. Krishna Rao
- Choreography: Pasumarthi
- Dialogues — Lyrics: Anisetty
- Playback: Ghantasala, P. Susheela, R. Balasaraswathi Devi, M. S. Ramarao, Pendyala Nageswara Rao, K. Rani
- Music: T. V. Raju
- Story: K. Pratyagatma
- Editing: G. D. Joshi
- Associate Director: Rajnikanth
- Cinematography: B. S. Ranga
- Producer: Donepudi Krushna Murthy
- Screenplay — Director: T. Prakash Rao
- Banner: Gokul Pictures
- Release Date: 2 March 1954

== Soundtrack ==
Nirupedalu

Film score by T. V. Raju
- Released: 1951
- Genre: Soundtrack
- Label: EMI Colambia Audio
- Producer: T. V. Raju

Music composed by T. V. Raju. Lyrics were written by Anisetty. Music released on EMI Colambia Audio Company.

S. No.	Song title	Singers	length
1	"Ammalaraa Vinnaraa"	M. S. Ramarao	2:45
2	"Lalalala Ee Pakha Suryapeta"	Pendyala Nageswara Rao	
3	"Maa Baanisale Ee Janamantha"	P. Susheela	
4	"Raavamma Nidura Raavamma"	R. Balasaraswathi Devi	3:15
5	"Sodarulaara"	Ghantasala, P. Susheela	5:38
6	"Yelaraa Ee Niraassa"	Pendyala Nageswara Rao	
7	"Eethele Ee Brathukintele" - 1	M. S. Ramarao	3:15
8	"Sir Polish"	K. Rani	3:22
9	"Eethele Ee Nirupedala Brathukintele" - 2	M. S. Ramarao	
