= Valmiki (1963 Kannada film) =

- Directed by: C. S. Rao
- Screenplay by: C. S. Rao
- Produced by: S. K. Habeebulla
- Starring: Rajkumar; Kantha Rao; Narasimharaju; Rajanala Kaleswara Rao
- Cinematography: M. A. Rehaman
- Edited by: K. Govindaswamy
- Music by: Ghantasala
- Production company: Jupiter Pictures
- Distributed by: Jupiter Pictures
- Release date: 3 January 1963
- Running time: 138 minutes
- Country: India
- Language: Kannada

Valmiki is a 1963 Indian Kannada-language film, directed by C. S. Rao and produced by S. K. Habeebulla. The film stars Rajkumar, Kantha Rao, Narasimharaju and Rajanala Kaleswara Rao. The film has musical score by Ghantasala. The movie is based on the life of Valmiki.

S. K. Bhagavan who was initially the co- director of the movie had to let go of the opportunity as he was also supposed to be involved with greater responsibility in Mantralaya Mahatme and hence suggested he be replaced with S. Siddalingaiah. Director C. S. Rao and Jupiter Pictures made the film simultaneously in Telugu with the same title starring N. T. Rama Rao in the lead role retaining most of the cast and crew. Kanta Rao appeared as Lord Rama in a song sequence in both versions. Veteran actress, Urvashi Sharada made her Kannada debut through this film.

== Cast ==
- Rajkumar
- Kantha Rao
- Narasimharaju
- Rajanala Kaleswara Rao
- Raghuramaiah
- Mikkilineni
- Srikanth
- A. V. Subba Rao
- Dr. Shivaramakrishnaiah
- Dharmaraj
- Jagga Rao
- Koteshwar Rao
- Sampath
- Basha
- Shando Krishna
- Raja Sulochana
- Leelavathi
- M. N. Lakshmi Devi
- Sharada
- Shakunthala
- B. Jaya
- Padmini
- Shashikala
- Pramila
- Kousalya

== Soundtrack ==
The music was composed by Ghantasala Venkateswara Rao.

No.	Song	Singers	Lyrics	Length
1	"Sri Ramayana Kaavya Katha"	Ghantasala Venkateswara Rao	Samudrala	13:26
2	"Anuragamila Konasaagavale"	Ghantasala Venkateswara Rao, P. Susheela	Samudrala	03:50
3	"Jhalala Jhalala Jhaladhare"	P. Susheela	Kanagal Prabhakar Shastry	
4	"Bhagawan Avatharika"	Ghantasala Venkateswara Rao		
