= Nindu Manasulu =

- Theatrical release poster
- Directed by: S. D. Lal
- Written by: Pinishetty (dialogues)
- Screenplay by: S. D. Lal
- Story by: S. D. Lal
- Produced by: M. Jaganatha Rao
- Starring: N. T. Rama Rao; Devika
- Cinematography: S. S. Lal
- Edited by: B. Gopal Rao
- Music by: T. V. Raju
- Production company: S.V.S. Films
- Release date: 10 August 1967
- Running time: 161 mins
- Country: India
- Language: Telugu

Nindu Manasulu (transl. Completed Hearts) is a 1967 Indian Telugu-language drama film, produced by M. Jaganatha Rao under the banner S.V.S. Films and directed by S. D. Lal. The film stars N. T. Rama Rao and Devika, with music composed by T. V. Raju. It is a remake of the 1966 Hindi film Phool Aur Patthar.

== Cast ==
- N. T. Rama Rao as Raju
- Devika as Susheela
- Rajanala as Seshu
- Satyanarayana as Rangaiah
- Ramana Reddy as Veerabhadraiah
- Allu Ramalingaiah as TB Patient
- Raja Babu as Chanti
- Dhulipala as Raghupati
- M. Balaiah as Lawyer
- Prabhakar Reddy as Nagulu
- Raavi Kondala Rao
- Ch. Krishna Murthy
- Vanisri as Chitti
- L. Vijayalakshmi as Rosy
- Chaya Devi as Durgamma

== Soundtrack ==
Music composed by T. V. Raju.

Song title	Lyrics	Singers	length
"Le Le Lemannadi"	C. Narayana Reddy	L. R. Eswari	4:06
"Chikkani Chekkili"	C. Narayana Reddy	L. R. Eswari	3:36
"Ayyayyayyo Adiripotunnanu"	C. Narayana Reddy	L. R. Eswari, A. L. Raghavan	4:39
"Neevevaro Nenevaro"	Dasaradhi	Ghantasala	3:35
"Apada Mokkulavada"	C. Narayana Reddy	P. Susheela	3:40
"Chitti Chitti"	Kosaraju	Pithapuram, L. R. Eswari	2:56
