= Baghdad Gaja Donga =

- Theatrical release poster
- Directed by: D. Yoganand
- Written by: Samudrala Jr (dialogues)
- Screenplay by: D. Yoganand
- Produced by: P. Padmanabha Rao
- Starring: N. T. Rama Rao; Jayalalithaa
- Cinematography: G. K. Ramu; Ravikant Nagaich
- Edited by: G. D. Joshi; G. Siva Murthy
- Music by: T. V. Raju
- Production company: Padma Gowri Pictures
- Release date: 24 October 1968
- Running time: 156 mins
- Country: India
- Language: Telugu

Baghdad Gaja Donga (transl. Thief of Baghdad) is a 1968 Telugu-language swashbuckler film directed by D. Yoganand. It stars N. T. Rama Rao and Jayalalithaa, with music composed by T. V. Raju. It is produced by P. Padmanabha Rao under the Padma Gowri Pictures banner.

== Cast ==
- N. T. Rama Rao as Faruk / Abu
- Jayalalithaa as Nazeem
- Rajanala as Vazeer Hussain
- Relangi as Basra Sultan
- Padmanabham as Ali
- Allu Ramalingaiah
- Mikkilineni as Baghdad Sultan Shamsuddin Khan
- Mukkamala as Ibrahim
- Pandari Bai as Began Saheba
- Geetanjali
- Vijayalalitha as dancer

== Soundtrack ==
Baghdad Gaja Donga

Film score by T. V. Raju
- Released: 1969
- Genre: Soundtrack
- Length: 27:35
- Producer: T. V. Raju

Music composed by T. V. Raju.

S. No.	Song title	Lyrics	Singers	Length
1	"Eeroju Maa Yuvaraju"	C. Narayana Reddy	Jikki	3:02
2	"Evaduraa Donga"	C. Narayana Reddy	Ghantasala	3:03
3	"Raave O Chinadaanaa"	C. Narayana Reddy	Ghantasala, P. Susheela	3:39
4	"Mere Bulbul Pyaaree"	Kosaraju	Pithapuram, L. R. Eswari	3:38
5	"Jagame Maayaraa"	Samudrala Jr.	L. R. Eswari	3:37
6	"Ghal Ghal Ghal"	C. Narayana Reddy	P. Susheela	3:40
7	"Haay Allaah"	C. Narayana Reddy	Ghantasala, P. Susheela	3:31
8	"Sye Sye Saradaaroo"	C. Narayana Reddy	P. Susheela	4:03
