= Nene Monaganni =

- Theatrical release poster
- Directed by: S. D. Lal
- Written by: Tripuraneni Maharadhi; Latha (dialogue)
- Screenplay by: S. D. Lal; Jagadish
- Story by: R. K. Shanmugam
- Produced by: S. D. Lal
- Starring: N. T. Rama Rao; Sheela
- Cinematography: K. S. Prasad
- Edited by: Govinda Swamy
- Music by: T. V. Raju
- Production company: Prathima Films
- Release date: 4 October 1968
- Running time: 164 mins
- Country: India
- Language: Telugu

Nene Monaganni (transl. I Am the Hero) is a 1968 Telugu-language action crime film, produced and directed by S. D. Lal on Prathima Films banner. It stars N. T. Rama Rao, Sheela and the music is composed by T. V. Raju.

== Cast ==
- N. T. Rama Rao as Vamsidhar
- Sheela as Neela
- Rajanala as Bhadrayya
- Dhulipala as Police Commissioner Mutyala Rao
- Ramana Reddy as Devaiah
- M. Balayya as Foreign Agent
- Satyanarayana as DSP Nandana Rao
- Allu Ramalingaiah as Editor Appala Chary
- Raja Babu as Reporter Varahalu / K.V.Hall
- Santha Kumari as Yashoda
- Geetanjali as 0
- Sandhya Rani as Reporter
- Jyothi Lakshmi as 00

== Soundtrack ==
The sound track of the original Telugu movie Nene Monaganni released in 1968.

Song	Singers	Lyrics	Length
"Vayasu Pilichindi"	Ghantasala		04:22
"Ninnu Choosindhi Modhalu"	P. Susheela, N. T. Rama Rao	Daasarathi	03:55
"Shokillaa Pillaa"	Ghantasala, P. Susheela, L. R. Eswari		03:58
"Gaaradi Chesesthaa"	Ghantasala, A.L. Raghavan		03:43
"Choosko Naa Raajaa"	L. R. Eswari		03:01
