= Rishyasringar (1964 film) =

Rishya Singar
- Directed by: Mukkamala
- Screenplay by: Thanjai N. Ramaiah Dass; M. S. Subramaniam
- Based on: Life of seer Rishyasringa
- Produced by: P. S. Seshachalam
- Starring: K. Balaji; Nagayya; Rajasulochana; Girija
- Cinematography: Adhi A. Irani; Malli M. Irani
- Edited by: A. Sanjeevi
- Music by: T. V. Raju
- Production company: Ravanam Brothers
- Distributed by: Geetha Pictures
- Release date: 1964
- Country: India
- Language: Tamil

Rishya Singar is a 1964 Indian Tamil language film directed by Mukkamala. The film stars K. Balaji and Rajasulochana.

== Plot ==
The story is based on the life of an Indian seer Rishyasringa

== Cast ==
The following list is adapted from the book Thiraikalanjiyam Part 2.

Male cast

- K. Balaji
- Gummadi
- Pattu Iyer
- L. Narayana Rao
- Nagayya
- T. V. Sethuraman
- V. K. Srinivasan
- Serukalathur Sama
- P. S. Venkatachalam
- Babji

Female cast

- Rajasulochana
- Girija
- K. Malathi
- Sukumari
- Latha
- K. S. Angamuthu
- Kusalakumari
- Lalitha Rao

== Production ==
The film was first produced in Telugu with the title Rushyasrunga and was released in 1961. The film was produced by P. S. Seshachalam under the banner Ravanam Brothers and was directed by Mukkamala. The story was re made in Tamil by Geetha Pictures with a different cast and was released in 1964. Mukkamala directed the Tamil film also. Thanjai N. Ramaiah Dass and M. S. Subramaniam wrote the dialogues. Adhi A. Irani and Malli M. Irani were in charge of cinematography while the editing was done by A. Sanjeevi. Art direction was done by T. V. S. Sharma and M. Somanath. Choreography by Pasumarthi Krishnamoorthi. Still photography by R. N. Nagaraja Rao. The film was shot at Vijaya, Vauhini and Neptune studios and was processed at Vijaya laboratory.

== Soundtrack ==
The music was composed by T. V. Raju and the lyrics were penned by Papanasam Sivan, Thanjai N. Ramaiah Dass and M. S. Subramaniam.

Song	Singer/s	Duration
"Kaadhal Inbame Kaanave"	P. Susheela	03:17
"Manithaa Unnai Potriya"	Ghantasala	02:34
"Vasanthamum Thendralum"	S. C. Krishnan, A. P. Komala	02:54
"Kalai Devane, Kalai Jeevane"	M. S. Padma, A. P. Komala	03:07
"Jaya Jaya Jaya Sri Narasimha"	Jikki, P. Leela	01:46
"Hari Hari Hari Hari Aum"	S. Janaki	02:56
"Vinnaalum Sundhara Roobam"	Ghantasala, S. Janaki	04:10
"Kannaalennaip Paaru"	A. L. Raghavan, K. Jamuna Rani	03:20
"Kal Kal Naadhamudan"	K. Jamuna Rani, group	02:26
"Unai Kandileyn"	Ghantasala, A. P. Komala	02:36
"Oh Vaanavar Khone"	T. M. Soundararajan	05:14
"Thalam Pukazhum Uyar"	V. N. Sundaram	01:14
