= Muddula Mogudu (1983 film) =

Muddula Mogadu
- Theatrical release poster
- Directed by: K. S. Prakash Rao
- Written by: Acharya Aatreya (dialogues)
- Screenplay by: K. S. Prakash Rao
- Produced by: Cherukuri Prakash Rao
- Starring: Akkineni Nageswara Rao; Sridevi; Suhasini
- Cinematography: S. Navakanth
- Edited by: Veemuri Ravi
- Music by: S. Rajeswara Rao
- Production company: Maheeja Films
- Release date: 4 February 1983
- Running time: 144 minutes
- Country: India
- Language: Telugu

Muddula Mogadu (transl. Loving Husband) is a 1983 Indian Telugu-language romantic drama film, produced by Cherukuri Prakash Rao and directed by K. S. Prakash Rao. It stars Akkineni Nageswara Rao, Sridevi and Suhasini with music composed by S. Rajeswara Rao. The film was released on 27 January 1983.

== Plot ==
Prasad is a popular stage artist and writer. Durga, a vainglory woman, daughter of a millionaire Gopala Rao loves and marries Prasad, being his fan. Soon after, as Prasad's income is little-bit low he is unable to bear spendthrift Durga. So, the time throws Prasad into debts, insults and spoils his health too. During that plight, Durga depends on her parents which hurts Prasad's individuality. At that juncture, a rift arises between the couple and Durga leaves the house. At last, Durga realises her mistake, understands the virtue of Prasad and pleads pardon. The film ends with the reunion of the couple.

== Cast ==
- Akkineni Nageswara Rao as Prasad
- Sridevi as Durga
- Suhasini as Sarala
- Satyanarayana as Gopala Rao
- Sarath Babu as Madhu
- Nagesh as Simham
- Dhulipala as 'Rangamarthanda' Madhavaiah
- Mikkilineni as Madhu's father
- S. Varalakshmi as Varam
- Telangana Shakuntala as Prasad's Neighbour

== Soundtrack ==
Music composed by S. Rajeswara Rao. Lyrics were written by Acharya Aatreya. Music released on EMI Columbia Audio Company.

S. No.	Song title	Singers	length
1	"Hey Hey Hey Navvinchi Kavvinchu"	S. P. Balasubrahmanyam, P. Susheela	4:21
2	"Toli Ne Chesina Pooja Phalamu"	S. P. Balasubrahmanyam, P. Susheela	3:54
3	"Malle Tellana Manchu Challana"	S. P. Balasubrahmanyam, P. Susheela	4:11
4	"Endariki Telusunu Premante"	S. P. Balasubrahmanyam, P. Susheela	5:20
5	"Enta Vinta Prema"	S. P. Balasubrahmanyam	3:35
6	"Aha Aha Navvandi"	S. P. Balasubrahmanyam	3:02
7	"Randi Rarandi"	S. P. Balasubrahmanyam	3:03
