= Manushullo Devudu =

- Theatrical release poster
- Directed by: B. V. Prasad
- Written by: Gollapudi (dialogues)
- Screenplay by: B. V. Prasad
- Story by: A. Pundarikakshaiah
- Produced by: A. Pundarikakshaiah
- Starring: N. T. Rama Rao; Vanisri; B. Saroja Devi
- Cinematography: J. Satyanarayana
- Edited by: B. Kandaswamy
- Music by: T. V. Raju; S. Hanumantha Rao
- Production company: Sri Bhaskara Chitra
- Release date: 5 April 1974
- Running time: 167 minutes
- Country: India
- Language: Telugu

Manushullo Devudu (transl. God in Human) is a 1974 Indian Telugu-language drama film, produced by A. Pundarikakshaiah under the Sri Bhaskara Chitra banner and directed by B. V. Prasad. It stars N. T. Rama Rao, Vanisri and B. Saroja Devi, with music composed by T. V. Raju as his last composition. He expired during the shoot and S. Hanumantha Rao completed the music. The film was remade in Hindi as Udhar Ka Sindur (1976).

== Cast ==
- N. T. Rama Rao as Raja / Raja Shekaram
- Vanisri as Rekha
- B. Saroja Devi as Shanti
- Krishnam Raju as Murali
- Gummadi as Dr. Ranganatham
- Relangi as Ramadasu
- Dhulipala as Garudachalam
- Raja Babu as Govindu
- Ram Mohan as Chanti Babu
- Sakshi Ranga Rao as Panganamalu
- Mada as Panakaala Rao
- Potti Prasad as Driver
- K. K. Sarma
- Anjali Devi as Janaki
- Vijaya Lalitha as Seetha
- P. R. Varalakshmi as Sudha

== Soundtrack ==
Music composed by T. V. Raju and S. Hanumantha Rao.

Song title	Music	Lyrics	Singers	length
"Aho Himavannagamu"	T. V. Raju	C. Narayana Reddy, Allasani Peddana	Ghantasala, P. Susheela, N. T. Ramarao, Vanisri	14:56
"Chettantha Magavadu"	T. V. Raju	C. Narayana Reddy	P. Susheela	
"Hey Rekha Sasirekha"	T. V. Raju	C. Narayana Reddy	S. P. Balasubrahmanyam	
"Challni Swamy"	S. Hanumantha Rao	Dasaradhi	S. Janaki	
"Ammammammammoi"	S. Hanumantha Rao	Kosaraju	P. Susheela	
"Gopala Nanu Palimparaava"	S. Hanumantha Rao	Dasaradhi	S. Janaki	3:58
"Hello Madam"	S. Hanumantha Rao	Kosaraju	Ghantasala	3:29
