= Kaksha =

1980 Telugu film by V. C. Guhanathan

- Theatrical poster
- Directed by: V. C. Guhanathan
- Based on: Bandie (1978 Bengali film)
- Written by: Jandhyala; V. C. Guhanathan
- Produced by: D. Ramanaidu
- Starring: Sobhan Babu; Sridevi; Jayachitra; Gummadi; Murali Mohan; Satyanarayana Kaikala
- Cinematography: Venkat
- Edited by: Ravi
- Music by: K. Chakravarthy
- Production company: Suresh Productions
- Release date: 28 March 1980
- Country: India
- Language: Telugu

Kaksha(transl. Revenge) is an Indian Telugu-language action film written and directed by V. C. Guhanathan in his Telugu cinema debut starring Sobhan Babu, Sridevi, Jayachitra, Gummadi, Murali Mohan, Kaikala Satyanarayana and Mohan Babu in the main roles. The film was released on 28 March 1980 was produced by renowned film producer D. Ramanaidu under Suresh Productions and had musical score by K. Chakravarthy. The film was a commercial success.

== Cast ==
- Sobhan Babu
- Sridevi
- Jayachitra
- Murali Mohan
- Gummadi
- Kaikala Satyanarayana
- Mohan Babu
- Ranganath
- Mikkilineni
- S. V. Ramadas
- Allu Ramalingaiah
- Prabhakara Reddy
- Giribabu
- Valluri Balakrishna
- Chalapathi Rao
- Narra Venkateswara Rao
- K. V. Chalam
- Usilaimani
- Jamuna
- Rama Prabha
- P. R. Varalakshmi
- CID Shakunthala
- Leela
- Baby Gowri

== Soundtrack ==
K. Chakravarthy scored and composed the film's six tracks comprising soundtrack album.

1. "Dushtula Meeda" — S. P. B., Madhavapeddi Ramesh, P. Susheela
2. "Orabba Olamma" — Anand, S. P. B., P. Susheela, S. P. Sailaja, Madhavapeddi Ramesh, K. Chakravarthy
3. "Kandireegato Cheppanura" — S. P. B., P. Susheela
4. "Bugga Meeda Muddu" — S. P. B., P. Susheela
5. "Isalakidi" — P. Susheela
6. "Naa Manasu" — Anand, S. Janaki
