= Aggi Veerudu =

- Theatrical release poster
- Directed by: B. V. Srinivas
- Written by: G. K. Murthy (dialogues)
- Screenplay by: B. V. Srinivas
- Story by: B. V. Srinivas
- Produced by: B. Vittalacharya
- Starring: N. T. Rama Rao; Rajasree
- Cinematography: H. S. Venu
- Edited by: K. Govinda Swamy
- Music by: Vijaya Krishna Murthy
- Production company: Sri Vittal Combines
- Release date: 17 October 1969
- Running time: 124 mins
- Country: India
- Language: Telugu

Aggi Veerudu (transl. Fire Martial) is a 1969 Telugu-language swashbuckler film, produced by B. Vittalacharya under the Sri Vital Combines banner and directed by B. V. Srinivas. It stars N. T. Rama Rao, and Rajasree with music composed by Vijaya Krishna Murthy. The film was dubbed in Tamil as Maya Theevu Ragasiyam .

== Cast ==
- N. T. Rama Rao as Yeshovardhana
- Rajasree as Padmavathi
- Satyanarayana
- Ramakrishna as Sesanka Varma
- Mikkilineni
- Mukkamala as Dharma Teja
- Tyagaraju as Rudhirakshudu
- Madhukuri Satyam
- Raavi Kondala Rao
- Vijayalalitha as Kamandhaki
- Meena Kumari as Hamsa
- Sarathi as Fisherman

== Soundtrack ==
Aggi Veerudu

Film score by Vijaya Krishna Murthy
- Released: 1969
- Genre: Soundtrack
- Length: 29:02
- Producer: Vijaya Krishna Murthy

Music composed by Vijaya Krishna Murthy.

S. No.	Song title	Lyrics	Singers	length
1	"Ledi Kannulu"	C. Narayana Reddy	Ghantasala, P. Susheela	3:37
2	"Sari Sari Magasiri"	Kosaraju	Chorus	3:31
3	"Aalaantidaani"	Kosaraju	P. Susheela	3:13
4	"Pilichindhi Andaala"	C. Narayana Reddy	P. Susheela	4:50
5	"Yevaro Neevevaro"	C. Narayana Reddy	P. Susheela, Ghantasala	4:07
6	"Ravvala Navvula"	C. Narayana Reddy	Ghantasala, P. Susheela	4:30
7	"Kakimukkuki Donda Pandu"	C. Narayana Reddy	P. Susheela	5:14
