= Bhale Thammudu (1969 film) =

1969 film by B. A. Subba Rao

- Theatrical release poster
- Directed by: B. A. Subba Rao
- Written by: Maddipatla Suri (dialogues)
- Screenplay by: B. A. Subba Rao
- Based on: China Town (Hindi)
- Produced by: A. Pundarikakshayya
- Starring: N. T. Rama Rao; K. R. Vijaya
- Cinematography: S. S. Lal
- Edited by: Kandaswamy
- Music by: T. V. Raju
- Production company: Tarakarama Pictures
- Release date: 18 November 1969
- Country: India
- Language: Telugu

Bhale Thammudu (transl. Bravo, younger brother!) is a 1969 Indian Telugu-language action crime film co-written and directed by B. A. Subba Rao. The film stars N. T. Rama Rao and K. R. Vijaya, with music composed by T. V. Raju. It is a remake of the Hindi film China Town (1962).

The film focuses on two estranged, separately raised twin brothers, following their father's murder. One brother has become a gangster, the other has become a club singer. An inspector convinces the singer to impersonate his brother and to infiltrate the gang.

== Cast ==
- N. T. Rama Rao as Ram Prasad (Paul) and Shyam Prasad
- K. R. Vijaya as Geetha
- Relangi as Rao Saheb
- Rajanala as Gun / Ganapathi
- M. Prabhakar Reddy as Inspector Sekhar
- Mikkilineni as Inspector Prasad
- Dr. Sivaramakrishnaiah
- Sriranjani Jr.
- Vijaya Girija as Leela
- Ramaprabha
- Aruna Irani as an item number

== Soundtrack ==
The music was composed by T. V. Raju with lyrics written by C. Narayana Reddy. The song "Nede Eenade" was remixed by Mani Sharma for Allari Pidugu. The song "Enthavaru Gaani" was later remixed by Sunny M. R. for Rowdy Fellow (2014).

Track listing
No.	Title	Singer(s)	Length
1.	"Eemaja"	P. Susheela
2.	"Enthavaru Gaani"	Mohammed Rafi	4:13
3.	"Gopala Bala Ninne Kori"	Mohammed Rafi, P. Susheela	4:31
4.	"Iddari Manasulu"	Mohammed Rafi, P. Susheela	4:15
5.	"Gumma Gumma"	Mohammed Rafi, P. Susheela
6.	"Nede Ee Nade"	Mohammed Rafi, P. Susheela	3:50
7.	"Qawali"	Mohammed Rafi, P. Susheela
