= Nindu Samsaram =

- Theatrical release poster
- Directed by: C. S. Rao
- Written by: Pinisetty (dialogues)
- Screenplay by: Nava Shakti Unit
- Story by: Nava Shakti Unit
- Produced by: P. Gangadhar Rao
- Starring: N. T. Rama Rao; Krishna Kumari
- Cinematography: J. Satyanarayana
- Edited by: Veerappa
- Music by: Master Venu
- Production company: Nava Shakti Productions
- Release date: 5 December 1968
- Country: India
- Language: Telugu

Nindu Samsaram (transl. The Whole Family) is a 1968 Telugu-language drama film directed by C. S. Rao. The film stars N. T. Rama Rao and Krishna Kumari, with music composed by Master Venu.

== Plot ==
Bhaskar, an honest young man, is looking for employment. He has a large family to support, including a blind father, Brahmaiah, a mother, Saraswatamma, and a disabled sister, Shanta. They are under the tight control of his domineering sister-in-law Tulasamma as his elder brother Ranganatham is incompetent.

== Cast ==
- N. T. Rama Rao as Bhaskar
- Krishna Kumari as Jyothi
- V. Nagayya as Brahmaiah
- Relangi as Umakanta Rao
- Ramana Reddy as Somaiah
- Prabhakar Reddy as Ranganatham
- Padmanabham as S. S. Mayya
- Balakrishna as Appanna
- Jagga Rao as Subba Rayudu
- S. Varalakshmi as Tulasamma
- Hemalatha as Saraswatamma
- Vijaya Lalitha
- Rama Prabha as Subbulu
- Anitha as Shanti
- Dubbing Janaki as Seeta

== Soundtrack ==
Music was composed by Master Venu.

Song title	Lyrics	Singers	length
"Yevarikee Thalavanchaku"	C. Narayana Reddy	Ghantasala	4:00
"Yavvaname Kadha"	Aarudhra	P. Susheela	4:02
"Naa Kannulu Neethoam"	Aarudhra	Ghantasala, P. Susheela	3:40
"Vayasutho Paniyemundhi"	C. Narayana Reddy	P. Susheela	4:04
"Joru Joruga Saanu"	Aarudhra	Pithapuram	3:15
"Okari Manasuram"	Dasaradhi	Ghantasala, P. Susheela	3:40
"My Dear Thulasammakka"	Aarudhra	Pithapuram	3:01
"Devudunnada"	Aarudhra	P. Susheela	3:30
