= Dhulipala =

Indian actor (1921–2007)

- Born: Dhulipala Sitarama Sastry; 24 September 1921; Palnadu, Guntur, Andhra Pradesh, India
- Died: 13 April 2007 (aged 85); Guntur, Andhra Pradesh, India
- Occupation: Actor
- Years active: 1961–2001
- Website: www.dhulipala.org

Dhulipala Sitarama Sastry (24 September 1921 – 13 April 2007), known mononymously by the surname Dhulipala, was an Indian actor and thespian, known for his works predominantly in Telugu cinema. He was noted for playing mythological roles, particularly the role of Shakuni. He began his acting career at the age of 13 and went on to work in about 300 films. He shot to fame with Bhishma and Sri Krishna Pandaveeyam, acting alongside N. T. Rama Rao.

== Life and career ==
Born on September 24, 1921, to Sankarayya and Ratnamma of Dachepalli village in Palnadu taluk of Guntur, Andhra Pradesh, he dropped out of school after 8th grade and spent a year at Sankara Vidyalayam, Bapatla, studying Vedas. Subsequently, he worked as a clerk for an advocate. He simultaneously started working in theatre, initially portraying female characters. He was introduced to film industry by his preceptor Mr. Gayudu (1927–2005), who was a famous actor, director, writer, singer and music director, make-up artist and also owned the costumes related to mythological dramas. Initially, Mr. Gayudu was selected for the role of Bhishma in the movie Bhishma and N. T. Rama Rao was offered the role of Duryodhana, but, due to a conspiracy to wedge Mr.Gayudu from entering the film industry, the art director of the movie, Mr. Vali, was arrested and made a deal out of it with Mr. Gayudu that if he drops out of the role of Bheeshma which he was offered and instead play the role of Duryodhana, he could get Vali released. Mr. Gayudu wasn't ready to accept the deal but for the sake of his friend Vali, he dropped out of the movie stating, his student Dhulipala, is capable enough to play Duryodhana. When NTR thanked him for dropping out of the movie, Mr.Gayudu replied showing him all the letters and telegrams that he received earlier, "I am backing off for the sake of my friend Vali. No matter how much you succeed in your career, don't forget that I was the first preference for the lead role of every movie and you had always been the second choice, as I couldn't make it on time and you grabbed the opportunities. I received Vendi Gada (Silver Gada) from Mysore Maharaja as a token of gratitude. That's my greatest achievement". Mr.Gayudu headed back home and never turned around. He realized that his brothers were right, as they said "Talent is injurious to career and life".

Hence, Dhulipala who was popular on the stage in the role of Duryodhana, made his debut with that film. Mr. Gayudu was the first choice for every lead role in mythological movies but his family members didn't want him to enter the film industry as they feared for his well-being after his uncle, the great actor Dommeti Surya Narayana was assassinated by his rivals, as he was the first generation superstar of Telugu film industry and was still thriving. So they concealed every letter and telegram that Mr.Gayudu received offering him the lead roles to work for their movies. Dhulipala entered film industry in 1960, with the movie Bhishma, portraying the role of Duryodhana. He acted in around 300 movies and won several accolades and awards. He was a staunch devotee of Hanuman and was inspired by Swami Jayendra Saraswati of Kanchi Kamakoti Peetham to take sanyas in 2001 and establish Maruthi Ashram at Guntur City. He died on 13 April 2007. He was survived by his wife and two sons.

== Selected filmography ==
- Murari (2001)
- Choodalani Vundi (1998)
- Oorantha Golanta (1989) as Govindayya
- Veera Pratap (1987)
- Sri Vemana Charithra (1986)
- Tandra Paparayudu (1986) as Buchanna
- Sangeeta Samrat (1984)
- Muddula Mogudu (1983) as 'Rangamarthanda' Madhavaiah
- Pratigna (1982) as Venkataramaiah
- Bobbili Puli (1982)
- Swargam (1981) as Hanumanthu
- Mahashakti (1980)
- Punnami Naagu (1980)
- Sri Tirupati Venkateswara Kalyanam (1979) as Bhrigu Maharshi
- Rangoon Rowdy (1979)
- Sri Vinayaka Vijayamu (1979) as Shukracharya
- Sri Madvirata Parvam (1979) as Shakuni
- Lawyer Viswanath (1978) as Judge
- Yuga Purushudu (1978) as Dhanunjayam
- Jaganmohini (1978)
- Daana Veera Soora Karna (1977) as Shakuni
- Kurukshetram (1977) as Indra
- Bangaru Bommalu (1977) as Ranganna
- Pichi Maraju (1976) as Dharma Rao
- Seeta Kalyanam (1976) as Vasishtha Mahamuni
- Mahakavi Kshetrayya (1976)
- Andharu Bagundali (1976) as Swamiji
- Gunavantudu (1975)
- Manushullo Devudu (1974) as Garudachalam
- Uttama Illalu (1974) as Bheemayya
- Manchi Manushulu (1974) as Dr. Anand
- Sri Ramanjaneya Yuddham (1974) as Yayati
- Mayadari Malligadu (1973) as Judge
- Ganga Manga (1973)
- Kanna Koduku (1973) as Buchi Raju
- Desoddharakulu (1973)
- Stree (1973)
- Andala Ramudu (1973) as Secretary
- Manchi Rojulu Vachayi (1972) as Zamindar Ungarala Bangaraiah
- Monagadostunnadu Jagratha (1972) as Gurunatham
- Inspector Bharya (1972) as Ranga Rao
- Bala Bharatam (1972) as Shakuni
- Sri Krishna Satya (1972) as Karna
- Collector Janaki (1972)
- Pattukunte Laksha (1971)
- Mattilo Manikyam (1971) as Mallayya
- Rajakota Rahasyam (1971)
- Adrusta Jathakudu (1971) as Parandhamaiah
- Pavitra Hrudayalu (1971) as Sivaiah
- Sampoorna Ramayanam (1971) as Vibhishana
- Mayani Mamata (1970) as Janakiramaiah
- Balaraju Katha (1970)
- Pettandarulu (1970)
- Ukku Pidugu (1969) as Sage Haricharanudu
- Bhale Abbayilu (1969) as Judge Madhava Rao
- Pratheekaram (1969) as Kanthayya
- Gandara Gandadu (1969) as Vijayendra
- Bhale Rangadu (1969) as Narasaiah
- Ekaveera (1969) as Father of Veerabhupati
- Aatmiyulu (1969) as Veerayya
- Nene Monaganni (1968)
- Kalisochina Adrushtam (1968)
- Bandhavyalu (1968)
- Undamma Bottu Pedata (1968)
- Veeranjaneya (1968) as Vishwamitra
- Aggi Meeda Guggilam (1968) as Chandavarma, Mahamantri of Sripura
- Ranabheri (1968) as Rajaguru
- Nindu Manasulu (1967)
- Aggi Dora (1967) as Raghunatha Rayalu, Maharaj of Ratnagiri
- Sri Krishnavataram (1967) as Satrajit
- Bhakta Prahlada (1967) as Indra
- Mohini Bhasmasura (1966) as Shukracharya
- Paduka Pattabhishekam (1966) as Dasaratha
- Sri Krishna Pandaveeyam (1966) as Shakuni
- Dorikithe Dongalu (1965)
- Pandava Vanavasam (1965) as Chitragupta
- Amara Silpi Jakkanna (1964) (Kannada)
- Bobbili Yuddham (1964) as Narasarayalu
- Nartanasala (1963) as Duryodhana
- Sri Krishnarjuna Yuddham (1963) as Gayudu
- Madana Kamaraju Katha (1962) as Acharya of Mahendragiri
- Mahamantri Timmarusu (1962)
- Kalimilemulu (1962) as Narasaiah
- Bhishma (1962) as Duryodhana

== Awards ==
- Nandi Award for Best Actor - 1968 - Bandhavyalu
