= Rama Prabha =

Indian actress (born 1947)

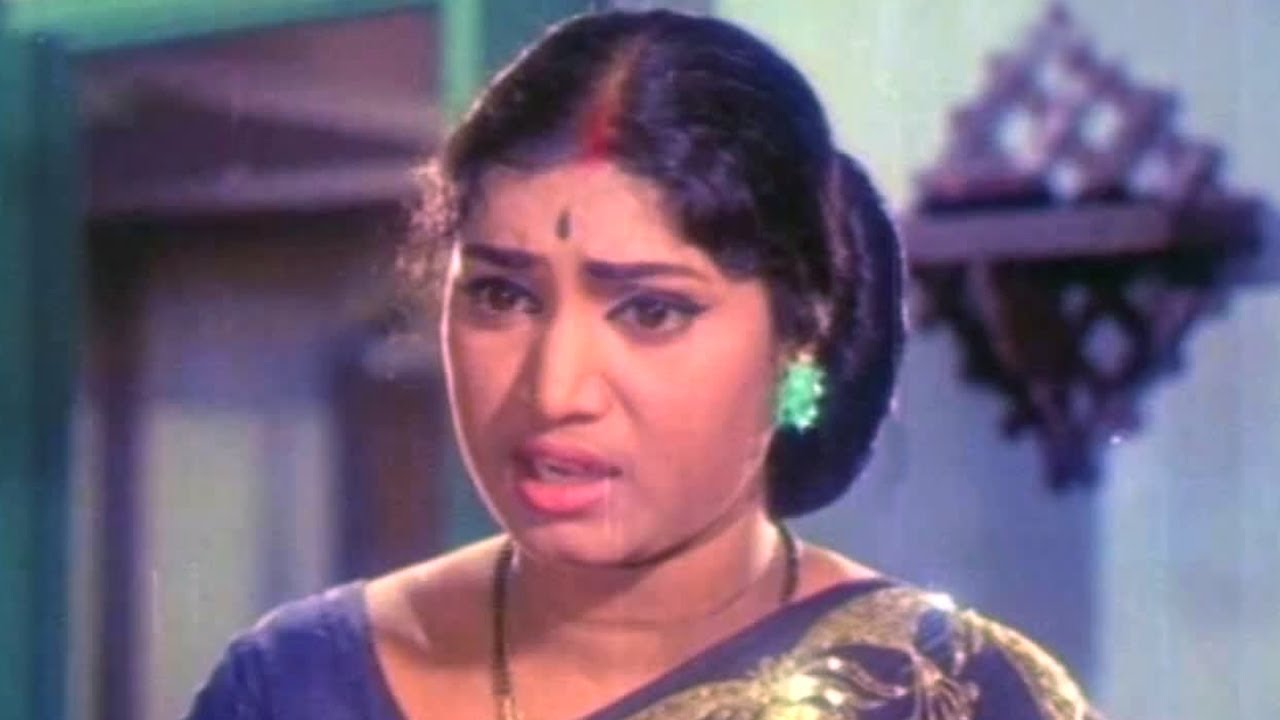
- Rama Prabha in a scene from Kalyana Mandapam (1971)
- Born: K.G Rama Prabha; 6 October 1947 (age 79); Vayalpadu, Annamayya district, Andhra Pradesh, India.
- Occupation: Actress
- Spouse: Sarath Babu (m. 1974; div. 1988)
- Children: Vijaya Chamundeswari (adopted)
- Relatives: Rajendra Prasad (son-in-law)

Rama Prabha is an Indian actress who performs in Telugu, Tamil and Hindi films. She has acted in more than 1,400 films and is credited as a character artist who shared screen space with superstars across most generations of South Indian Cinema with a career spanning over six decades. She formed a noted pair on Telugu screen during the 1970s and 1980s with comedian Raja Babu. She acted opposite Nagesh in Shanti Nilayam and many other films from 1968 onwards. She acted in Hindi opposite Mehmood in the movie Do Phool.

== Personal life ==
When she was one month old, her father's sister adopted her and they shifted to Ooty. Rama's childhood was spent there till the age of 14 years when they shifted to Chennai. She currently lives in Vayalpadu, near Madanapalle.

She had adopted her sister's infant daughter, Vijaya Chamundeswari. Vijaya is married to film actor Rajendra Prasad.

== Filmography ==
=== Telugu films ===
Year	Film	Role
1966	Chilaka Gorinka	Shashi
1966	Dr. Anand	Mathi
1968	Nindu Samsaram	
1968	Vintha Kapuram	Ramanamma
1968	Deva Kanya	
1969	Sri Rama Katha	Lady interested in buying bangles
1969	Gandikota Rahasyam	Subbulu
1970	Akka Chellelu	Saroja
1970	Pettandarulu	
1971	Kalyana Mandapam	Prema
1971	Vintha Samsaram	Prabhavathi
1971	Bomma Borusa	Ammaji
1972	Vichitra Bandham	Bhagya Laxmi
1972	Tata Manavadu	
1972	Korada Rani	Kamakshi
1972	Muhammad bin Tughluq	
1972	Iddaru Ammayilu	
1972	Badi Panthulu	Rama
1973	Samsaara Saagaram	
1973	Meena	Narayana's Tamilian wife
1974	Tulabharam	Vani
1974	O Seeta Katha	
1975	Jeevana Jyoti	
1975	Ammayila Sapatham	
1976	Vintha Illu Santha Gola	Actor/Producer
1976	Soggadu	
1976	America Ammayi	
1976	Siri Siri Muvva	
1976	Shri Rajeshwari Vilas Coffee Club	
1976	Muthyala Pallaki	Lucy
1976	Manushulanta Okkate	Mutyalu/Rama
1977	Amara Deepam	
1977	Adavi Ramudu	
1977	Tholireyi Gadichindi	
1977	Chakradhari	
1977	Gadusu Pillodu	Gajalakshmi
1977	Janma Janmala Bandham	
1978	Dongala Dopidi	Subbulu
1978	Pranam Khareedu	Chaakali Subbi
1978	Amara Prema	
1978	Patnavasam	Chandramathi
1978	Chilipi Krishnudu	
1978	Panthalu Pattimpulu	
1979	Naa Illu Naa Vaalu	
1979	Hema Hemeelu	
1979	Intinti Ramayanam	
1979	Sommokadidhi Sokokadidhi	
1979	Gorintaku	
1979	Karthika Deepam	
1979	Idi Kathakaadu	
1980	Mama Allulla Saval	
1980	Kaksha	
1980	Alludu Pattina Bharatam	
1980	Konte Mogudu Penki Pellam	Dhanalakshmi
1981	Gadasari Attaha Sosagara Kodalu	
1981	47 Rojulu	
1982	Swayamvaram	
1982	Patnam Vachina Pativrathalu	
1982	Devatha	
1982	Pelleedu Pillalu	
1982	Korukunna Mogudu	
1984	Janani Janmabhoomi	Padmini's mother
1984	Swathi	
1984	Mukkopi	
1984	Dandayatra	Santana Lakshmi
1985	Bharyabhartala Bandham	
1985	Kotha Pelli Koothuru	
1985	Aalaya Deepam	
1985	Maa Inti Mahalakshmi	Subbalakshmi
1985	Kongumudi	Varalakshmi and her daughter (Double Role)
1985	Mayaladi	Head Constable Tilakam
1985	Muchataga Mugguru	Rama Devi
1986	Sri Shirdi Saibaba Mahathyam	
1986	Kaliyuga Pandavulu	
1986	Mama Kodallu Saval	
1986	Seetharama Kalyanam	
1986	Bhayam Bhayam	
1986	Vikram	
1986	Karu Diddina Kapuram	Indumathi
1987	Punya Dampathulu	
1987	Kaboye Alludu	
1987	Rotation Chakravarthy	
1987	Collector Gari Abbai	
1987	Ramu	
1987	Viswanatha Nayakudu	
1987	Gandhinagar Rendava Veedhi	
1988	Chattamto Chadarangam	Andallu
1988	Varasudochadu	
1988	Aatma Katha	
1988	Vivaha Bhojanambu	Durga
1988	Maa Inti Maharaju	
1988	Premayanam	
1988	Chilipi Dampatulu	
1989	Naa Mogudu Naake Sontham	
1990	Kaddapa Reddamma	
1990	Iddaru Iddare	
1991	Tholi Puddu	
1991	Kulamma Gunamma	
1992	Prema Vijetha	
1992	Appula Appa Rao	Ammaji
1992	Killer	
1993	Kalachakram	
1993	Akka Chellelu	
1993	Donga Alludu	
1996	Ninne Pelladata	
1996	Nalla Pussalu	
1997	Devudu	
1997	Preminchukundam Raa	
1997	Super Heroes	
1997	Priyamaina Srivaru	
1998	Ooyala	
1998	Ganesh	
1998	Aavida Maa Aavide	Archana's mother
1998	Subbaraju Gari Kutumbam	
1998	Subhalekhalu	
1998	Pandaga	
1998	Premante Idera	Subbammatta
1999	Naa Hrudayamlo Nidurinche Cheli	Malik's wife
1999	Krishna Babu	
1999	Alludugaaru Vachcharu	
2000	Badri	
2001	Apparao Ki Oka Nela Thappindi	
2001	Family Circus	Subbu's grandmother
2001	Repallelo Radha	
2001	Jackpot	
2001	Snehamante Idera	Padmini's grandmother
2001	Ammaye Navvithe	
2001	Thank You Subba Rao	
2002	Lahiri Lahiri Lahirilo	
2002	Nee Thodu Kavali	
2003	Nenu Pelliki Ready	
2003	Tagore	Tagore's grandmother
2004	Seshadri Naidu	
2004	Pallakilo Pellikoothuru	
2004	Mr & Mrs Sailaja Krishnamurthy	Krishnamurthy's aunt
2005	Avunanna Kaadanna	
2006	Devadasu	Bhanumathi's grandmother
2006	Happy	Madhumati's grandmother
2006	Veerabhadra	
2006	Party	
2006	Ashok	Ashok's grandmother
2006	Kithakithalu	Rajababu's grandmother
2006	Evandoi Srivaru	Aishwarya Rai
2007	Desamuduru	Mataji
2008	Neninthe	Ravi's mother
2009	Rechipo	
2009	Neramu Siksha	
2010	Adhurs	Chandrakala's Mother
2011	Money Money, More Money	Rekha's Mother
2011	Maaro	
2012	Savior	Siyona's Grandmother
2013	Seethamma Vakitlo Sirimalle Chettu	Seetha's grandmother
2013	Tadakha	
2013	Ongole Githa	Sandhya's grandmother
2015	Temper	Shanvi's grandmother
2015	Vinavayya Ramayya	
2015	Bengal Tiger	Akash's grandmother
2016	Gentleman	Aishwarya's grandmother
2017	Vaisakham	
2021	Aaradugula Bullet	Shivaram's grandmother
2021	Romantic	Mary
2022	Good Luck Sakhi	Avva

=== Tamil films ===
Year	Film	Role
1964	Server Sundaram	Radha's friend (dancer)
1966	Selvam	Rathna
1967	Pattanathil Bhootham	Saroja
1969	Gurudhakshaneiy	Valli
1969	Kuzhandai Ullam	
1969	Shanti Nilayam	Geetha
1970	Kann Malar	Gomathi
1970	Engirundho Vandhaal	Parvathi
1970	Vietnam Veedu	Mala
1970	Enga Mama	Vadivu
1970	Thirumalai Thenkumari	Saroja
1971	Uttharavindri Ulle Vaa	Andal
1971	Irulum Oliyum	Rama
1972	Vasantha Maligai	Panchavarnam's lover
1972	Raman Thediya Seethai	Krishnan's love interest
1972	Kasethan Kadavulada	Rama
1974	Netru Indru Naalai	Muniyamma
1980	Anbukku Naan Adimai	Gowri's sister
1981	47 Natkal	pickpocket
1991	Thanthu Vitten Ennai	Kalyani
2018	Kalakalappu 2	Srinivas's grandmother
2023	Vasantha Mullai	Hotel Owner's wife

=== Other language films ===
Year	Film	Role	Language
1973	Rani Aur Jaani	Geetha	Hindi
1974	Do Phool	Rukmini	Hindi
1976	Rangila Ratan	Chamki	Hindi
1975	Mane Belaku		Kannada
1975	Devara Kannu		Kannada

=== Television ===
- Lady Detective (1996–1997) as Baby

== Awards ==
- She won Nandi Award for Best Female Comedian - Lahiri Lahiri Lahirilo (2002)
