= C. S. Rao =

Indian actor

- Born: Chittajallu Srinivasa Rao; 1924; Kakinada, India
- Died: 8 December 2004 (aged 79–80); Chennai, India
- Occupations: Actor, writer, director
- Spouse: Rajasulochana
- Children: 2

Chittajallu Srinivasa Rao (1924 – 8 December 2004) was an Indian actor, writer and director. He was the son of film director Chittajallu Pullayya. He directed around 65 films in the Telugu, Tamil, Malayalam and Oriya languages. He garnered two National Film Awards for directing the films Lava Kusa (1963) and Desamante Manushuloyi (1970). Directors including Muktha V. Srinivasan and K. S. Sethu Madhavan worked as his assistants.

== Early life and career ==
He was born in 1924 in Kakinada, East Godavari, Andhra Pradesh. He started his career in films as a child actor, appearing in two movies directed by his father Chittajallu Pullayya and released in 1936, Anasuya and Dhruva. He later worked as an assistant to cinematographer K. Ramnoth, art director V. A. K. Sekhar, and Uday Shankar. He assisted his father in the 1953 film Pakkinti Ammayi as both actor and screenplay writer.

He made his directorial debut in Tamil cinema with Ponni (1953) and then in Telugu with the feature Sri Krishna Tulabaram (1955). He directed around 65 movies in the Tamil, Telugu, Malayalam, and Oriya languages. His popular Telugu movies included Lava Kusa (1963), Manchi Manasuku Manchi Rojulu (1958), Santinivasam (1960), Abhimanam (1960), Tiger Ramudu (1962), Valmeeki (1963), Kanchu Kota (1967), Govula Gopanna (1968), Ekaveera (1969), Jeevitha Chakram (1971), Sri Krishnanjaneya Yuddham (1972), Dhanamaa? Daivamaa? (1973), Yashoda Krishna (1975), and Mahakavi Kshetrayya (1976). He also acted in a number of movies, which included Pelli Sandadi (1959), Intlo Ramayya Veedhilo Krishnayya (1982), Jebudonga (1987), and Kokila (1989).

== Personal life ==
He married the daughter of Kannamba and Kadaru Nagabhushanam. After her death, he fell in love with dancer and actress Rajasulochana. They married and had twin daughters. He died on 8 December 2004 in Chennai.

== Filmography ==
1. Anasuya (1936) (as child actor)
2. Dhruva (1936) (as child actor)
3. Pakka Inti Ammayi (Telugu, 1953) (actor and screen adaptation)
4. Ponni (1953) (director)
5. Pona Machan Thirumbi Vandhan (1954) (director)
6. Sri Krishna Tulabharam (Telugu, 1955) (director)
7. Anna Thamudu (1958) (director)
8. Manchi Manasuku Manchi Rojulu (1958) (director)
9. Sri Krishna Maya (1958) (director)
10. Pelli Sandadi (1959) (actor)
11. Naradhar Kalyanam (1959) (director)
12. Sabash Ramu (1959) (director)
13. Sabhash Ramudu (1959) (director)
14. Abhimanam (1960) (director)
15. Santhi Nivasam (1960) (director)
16. Pellikani Pillalu (1961) (director)
17. Tiger Ramudu (1962) (director)
18. Santhi Nivas (1962) (director)
19. Lava Kusa (Telugu, 1963) (director)
20. Valmiki (Telugu, 1963) (director)
21. Lava Kusa (Tamil, 1963) (director)
22. Valmiki (Kannada, 1963) (director)
23. Keelu Bommalu (Telugu, 1965) (director)
24. Prachanda Bhairavi (1965) (director)
25. Pratignapalana (1965) (director)
26. Kanchukota (1967) (director)
27. Pallava Sevengal (1967) (director)
28. Bangaru Gaajulu (1968) (director)
29. Govula Gopanna (1968) (director)
30. Gramadevathulu (1968) (director)
31. Mana Samsaram (1968) (director)
32. Niluvu Dopidi (1968) (director)
33. Nindu Samsaram (1968) (director)
34. Ekaveera (Telugu, 1969) (director)
35. Mamaku Tagga Kodalu (1969) (director)
36. Pettandarulu (1970) (director)
37. Desamante Manushuloy (1970) (director)
38. Malli Pelli (1970) (director)
39. Marina Manishi (1970) (director)
40. Rendu Kutumbala Katha (1970) (director)
41. Bhagyavanthudu (1971) (director)
42. Jeevitha Chakram (Telugu, 1971) (director)
43. Rangeli Raja (1971) (director)
44. Sri Krishnanjaneya Yuddham (1972) (director)
45. Desoddharakulu (1973) (director)
46. Dhanama? Daivama? (1973) (director)
47. Adambaralu Anubhandalu (1974) (director)
48. Anaganaga Oka Thandri (1974) (director)
49. Bandhalu Anubhandhalu (1974) (director)
50. Devudulanti Manishi (1975) (director)
51. Swandam Kariyum Zindabad (1975) (director)
52. Yashoda Krishna (Telugu, 1975) (director)
53. Mahakavi Kshetrayya (Telugu, 1976) (director)
54. Manchiki Maro Peru (1976) (director)
55. Punardatta (1976) (director)
56. Sri Renukadevi Mahatme (1977) (director)
57. Allari Pillalu (1978) (director)
58. Parasuraman (1978) (director)
59. Intlo Ramayya Veedilo Krishnayya (Telugu, 1982) (actor)
60. Radhamma Mogudu (1982) (director)
61. Bhayankara Bhasmasura (1983) (director)
62. Triveni Sangamam (1983) (actor)
63. Abhilasha (1983) (actor)
64. Maro Maya Bazaar (1983) (director)
65. Raja Harishchandra (1984) (director)
66. Satya Harishchandra (1984) (Odia, director)
67. Gruhalakshmi (1985) (Odia, director)
68. Palnati Simham (1985) (actor) as Judge
69. Jebu Donga (1987) (actor) as Peter Samuel
70. Yogi Vemana (Telugu, 1988) (director)
71. Rocky (1988) (actor)
72. Chennapatnam Chinnollu (1989) as Himself
73. Gudachari 117 (1989) (actor)
74. Kokila (1990) (actor)
75. Niyantha (1990)
76. I Love India (1993) (Tamil, actor)
