= Allu Ramalingaiah =

Indian actor, comedian and film producer (1922–2004)

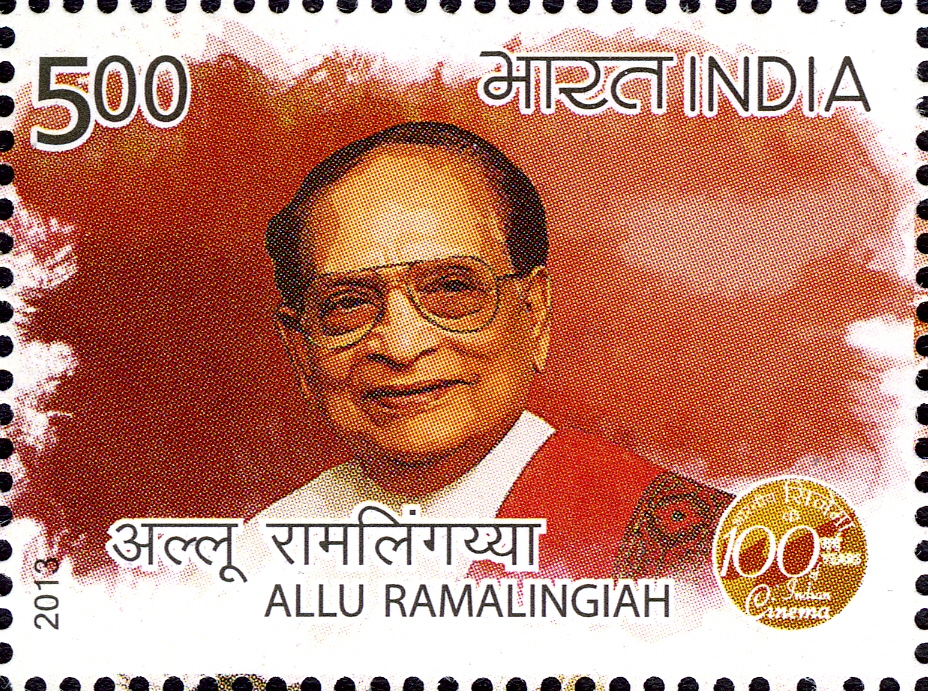
- Ramalingaiah on a 2013 stamp of India
- Born: 1 October 1922; Palakollu, Madras Presidency, British India
- Died: 31 July 2004 (aged 81); Hyderabad, Andhra Pradesh, India
- Occupations: Character actor; comedian; producer
- Years active: 1953–2004
- Spouse: Kanakaratnam
- Children: 3, including Allu Aravind
- Family: See Konidela–Allu family
- Awards: Padma Shri (1990)

Allu Ramalingaiah (1 October 1922 – 31 July 2004) was an Indian character actor, comedian, and producer known for his works in Telugu cinema. In 1990, he was honoured with the Padma Shri for his contribution to Indian cinema. In 1998, he received the Filmfare Lifetime Achievement Award - South, and the Raghupathi Venkaiah Award in 2001. Ramalingaiah appeared in over 1000 films in a variety of roles. The "Allu Ramalingaiah National Award" was instituted in his memory by the "Allu Ramalingaiah Academy of Arts". The award is presented every year to a Telugu film personality for lifetime achievement. He is the father-in-law of Telugu actor Chiranjeevi. Surekha Konidala is his daughter. Tollywood producer Allu Aravind is his son.

== Early life ==
Ramalingaiah was born on October 1, 1922, in Palakollu, Andhra Pradesh.

== Awards ==
- Raghupathi Venkaiah Award for the year 2001
- Padma Shri award by the Government of India for his outstanding contribution to Telugu cinema in the year 1990
- Filmfare Lifetime Achievement Award - South – 1998
- Nandi Award for Akkineni Award for Best Home-viewing Feature Film – Dabbu Bhale Jabbu (1992)

== Selected filmography ==
| Year | Title | Role | Notes |
|---|---|---|---|
| 1953 | Puttillu | | |
| 1954 | Parivartana | | |
| 1954 | Vipranarayana | | |
| 1954 | Chakrapani | | |
| 1954 | Vaddante Dabbu | | |
| 1955 | Donga Ramudu | | |
| 1955 | Santanam | | |
| 1955 | Missamma | | |
| 1956 | Chiranjeevulu | | |
| 1956 | Ilavelpu | | |
| 1957 | Mayabazar | Sharma | |
| 1957 | Sati Savitri | | |
| 1957 | Bhagya Rekha | | |
| 1957 | Sankalpam | Blade | |
| 1957 | Todi Kodallu | | |
| 1958 | Pelli Naati Pramanalu | | |
| 1958 | Aada Pettanam | | |
| 1958 | Appu Chesi Pappu Koodu | | |
| 1958 | Manchi Manasuku Manchi Rojulu | | |
| 1959 | Illarikam | | |
| 1959 | Krishna Leelalu | | |
| 1960 | Runanubhandham | | |
| 1960 | Abhimanam | | |
| 1960 | Sahasra Siracheda Apoorva Chintamani | | |
| 1960 | Anna Chellelu | | |
| 1960 | Maa Babu | | |
| 1961 | Iddaru Mitrulu | | |
| 1961 | Bharya Bhartalu | | |
| 1961 | Kalasi Vunte Kaladu Sukham | | |
| 1961 | Bhakta Jayadeva | | |
| 1962 | Gundamma Katha | | |
| 1962 | Swarna Manjari | | |
| 1962 | Manchi Manasulu | | |
| 1962 | Kula Gothralu | | |
| 1962 | Siri Sampadalu | Appanna | |
| 1963 | Narthanasala | | |
| 1963 | Sri Krishnarjuna Yudham | | |
| 1963 | Irugu Porugu | | |
| 1963 | Manchi Chedu | | |
| 1963 | Chaduvukunna Ammayilu | | |
| 1964 | Dagudu Moothalu | | |
| 1964 | Mooga Manasulu | | |
| 1964 | Sri Satyanarayana Mahathyam | | |
| 1964 | Murali Krishna | | |
| 1964 | Varavsatnam | | |
| 1965 | Naadi Aada Janme | | |
| 1965 | Pandava Vanavasam | | |
| 1965 | Aada Brathuku | | |
| 1965 | Dorikithe Dongalu | | |
| 1965 | Mangamma Sapatham | | |
| 1965 | Aatma Gowravam | | |
| 1965 | Preminchi Choodu | | |
| 1966 | Pidugu Ramudu | | |
| 1966 | Srimathi | | |
| 1966 | Paduka Pattabhishekam | Kamayya | |
| 1966 | Sakunthala | | |
| 1966 | Loguttu Perumallukeruka | Bhim | |
| 1966 | Mohini Bhasmasura | Naamam | |
| 1966 | Paramanandayya Shishyula Katha | | |
| 1967 | Gopaludu Bhoopaludu | | |
| 1967 | Pinni | | |
| 1967 | Nindu Manasulu | | |
| 1967 | Bhuvana Sundari Katha | | |
| 1967 | Sati Sumathi | | |
| 1967 | Gruhalakshmi | | |
| 1967 | Punyavathi | | |
| 1967 | Nirdoshi | | |
| 1967 | Prana Mithrulu | | |
| 1967 | Ummadi Kutumbam | | |
| 1967 | Poola Rangadu | | |
| 1968 | Tikka Sankaraiah | | |
| 1968 | Ranabheri | | |
| 1968 | Attagaru Katha Kodalu | | |
| 1968 | Uma Chandi Gowri Sankarula Katha | | |
| 1968 | Kalasina Manasulu | | |
| 1968 | Amayakudu | | |
| 1968 | Ramu | | |
| 1968 | Baghdad Gaja Donga | | |
| 1968 | Chuttarikalu | | |
| 1968 | Nene Monaganni | | |
| 1968 | Bandhavyalu | | |
| 1968 | Manchi Kutumbam | | |
| 1968 | Deva Kanya | | |
| 1968 | Vintha Kapuram | Garuda Vahanam | |
| 1969 | Buddhimanthudu | | |
| 1969 | Varakatnam | | |
| 1969 | Nindu Hrudayalu | | |
| 1969 | Kathanayakudu | | |
| 1969 | Gandikota Rahasyam | Avadhani | |
| 1969 | Kannula Panduga | | |
| 1969 | Jarigina Katha | Gurunatham | |
| 1969 | Muhurtha Balam | Panakalu | |
| 1969 | Bhale Abbayilu | Ramalingam, Orphanage Manager | |
| 1969 | Annadamulu | | |
| 1969 | Bhale Rangadu | | |
| 1969 | Karpura Harathi | Subbarayudu | |
| 1970 | Akka Chellelu | | |
| 1970 | Balaraju Katha | | |
| 1970 | Amma Kosam | | |
| 1970 | Pelli Sambandham | | |
| 1970 | Maa Manchi Akkayya | | |
| 1970 | Pettandarulu | | |
| 1970 | Dharma Daata | | |
| 1970 | Marina Manishi | | |
| 1970 | Ali Baba 40 Dongalu | | |
| 1970 | Sambarala Rambabu | | |
| 1970 | Allude Menalludu | | |
| 1970 | Jai Jawan | | |
| 1970 | Talli Tandrulu | | |
| 1971 | Vinta Samsaram | | |
| 1971 | Bomma Borusa | | |
| 1971 | Ramalayam | | |
| 1971 | Kathanayakuralu | Sivayya | |
| 1971 | Chinnanati Snehitulu | | |
| 1971 | Pattindalla Bangaram | Rangaiah's secretary | |
| 1971 | Anuradha | Ramalingam | |
| 1971 | Atthalu Kodallu | Tirupathayya | |
| 1971 | Sisindri Chittibabu | | |
| 1971 | Pavitra Hrudayalu | | |
| 1972 | Iddaru Ammayilu | | |
| 1972 | Tata Manavadu | | |
| 1972 | Pandanti Kapuram | | |
| 1972 | Sabash Vadina | | |
| 1972 | Attanu Diddina Kodalu | | |
| 1972 | Bharya Biddalu | | |
| 1972 | Inspector Bharya | | |
| 1972 | Kadalu Pilla | | |
| 1972 | Muhammad bin Tughluq | | |
| 1972 | Kalam Marindi | | |
| 1972 | Vichitra Bandham | | |
| 1973 | Andala Ramudu | | |
| 1973 | Desoddharakulu | | |
| 1973 | Sharada | | |
| 1973 | Vichitra Vivaham | | |
| 1973 | Devudu Chesina Manasulu | | |
| 1973 | Pasi Hrudayalu | | |
| 1973 | Minor Babu | Bhupalayya | |
| 1973 | Sneha Bandham | | |
| 1973 | Thalli Kodukulu | | |
| 1973 | Kanne Vayasu | | |
| 1973 | Nindu Kutumbam | Govindanamalu | |
| 1973 | Doctor Babu | | |
| 1973 | Meena | Venkatachari | |
| 1973 | Devudamma | | |
| 1973 | Vaade Veedu | | |
| 1974 | Banthrotu Bharya | | |
| 1974 | Samsaram Sagaram | | |
| 1974 | Manasulu Mattibommalu | | |
| 1974 | Kode Nagu | | |
| 1974 | Gowri | | |
| 1974 | Palleturi Chinnodu | | |
| 1974 | Chairman Chalamayya | | |
| 1974 | Intinti Katha | | |
| 1974 | Galipatalu | | |
| 1974 | Radhamma Pelli | | |
| 1974 | Bangaru Kalalu | | |
| 1974 | Ram Raheem | | |
| 1974 | Peddalu Marali | | |
| 1974 | Chakravakam | | |
| 1975 | Zamindarugari Ammayi | Lingaraju | |
| 1975 | Jeevana Jyothi | | |
| 1975 | Balipeetam | | |
| 1975 | Samsaram | | |
| 1975 | Moguda Pellama | | |
| 1975 | Soggadu | | |
| 1975 | Kotha Kapuram | | |
| 1975 | Santhanam Soubhagyam | | |
| 1975 | Kathanayakuni Katha | | |
| 1975 | Bhagasthulu | Ramalingam | |
| 1975 | Jebu Donga | | |
| 1975 | Babu | | |
| 1975 | Muthyala Muggu | | |
| 1976 | Padi Pantalu | Soorayya, the village barber | |
| 1976 | Andharu Bagundali | Govindayya | |
| 1976 | Ramarajyamlo Rakthapasam | | |
| 1976 | Bhakta Kannappa | | |
| 1976 | Manushulanta Okkate | | |
| 1976 | Alludochadu | Garudachalam | |
| 1976 | Secretary | | |
| 1976 | Bangaru Manishi | Bhajagovindam | |
| 1976 | Shri Rajeshwari Vilas Coffee Club | | |
| 1976 | Pichi Maraju | Gopal Krishna | |
| 1976 | Raaja | Manmadharamaiah | |
| 1976 | Monagadu | Seshaiah | |
| 1977 | Savasagallu | | |
| 1977 | Devathalara Deevinchandi | | |
| 1977 | Premalekhalu | | |
| 1977 | Yamagola | | |
| 1977 | Janma Janmala bandham | Venkatappayya | |
| 1977 | Eenati Bandham Yenatido | 'Kolla' Venkaiah aka Simhagiri Venkatasubbaiah | |
| 1977 | Aalu Magalu | | |
| 1977 | Gadusu Pillodu | Vaikuntham | |
| 1977 | Chiranjeevi Rambabu | Kanakaiah | |
| 1977 | Jeevithamlo Vasantham | Venkatasubbaiah | |
| 1978 | Lawyer Viswanath | Pakshiraju Seetaramaiah / Pakshi | |
| 1978 | Mugguru Muggure | Gaslight Gangaiah | |
| 1978 | Chilipi Krishnudu | | |
| 1978 | Manavoori Pandavulu | | |
| 1978 | Dongala Veta | | |
| 1978 | Pottelu Punnamma | | |
| 1978 | Gorantha Deepam | | |
| 1978 | Kalanthakulu | Budaga Rao | |
| 1978 | Sivaranjani | | |
| 1978 | Love Marriage | 'Harikatha Marthanda' Venkatappaiah | |
| 1978 | Kumara Raja | | |
| 1978 | Sahasavanthudu | Kamandalam | |
| 1979 | Kothala Raayudu | | |
| 1979 | Sankarabharanam | | |
| 1979 | Tayaramma Bangarayya | | |
| 1979 | Andadu Aagadu | Kodandam | |
| 1979 | Vetagadu | | |
| 1979 | Maa Voollo Mahasivudu | Vinayaka Rao | |
| 1979 | Samajaniki Saval | Varalayya | |
| 1979 | Dongalaku Saval | Lingam | |
| 1979 | Amma Evarikaina Amma | Gopalrao | |
| 1980 | Mayadari Krishnudu | | |
| 1980 | Mosagadu | Inspector Koteshwara Rao | |
| 1980 | Bhale Krishnudu | | |
| 1980 | Chandipriya | | |
| 1980 | Bhola Shankarudu | | |
| 1980 | Mama Allulla Saval | Papaiah | |
| 1980 | Sardar Papa Rayudu | | |
| 1980 | Kaksha | | |
| 1980 | Sirimalle Navvindi | | |
| 1980 | Adrushtavanthudu | Madhava | |
| 1980 | Deeparadhana | Govindayya | |
| 1980 | Gharana Donga | Govindaiah | |
| 1980 | Ragile Hrudayalu | Pilli Raju aka 'Elugubanti' | |
| 1981 | Ragile Jwala | Kanakaiah | |
| 1981 | Kirayi Rowdylu | | |
| 1981 | Parvathi Parameswarulu | | |
| 1981 | Nyayam Kavali | | |
| 1981 | Prema Kanuka | | |
| 1981 | Saptapadi | | |
| 1981 | Thodu Dongalu | | |
| 1981 | Agni Poolu | | |
| 1981 | Taxi Driver | Lingaraju | |
| 1981 | Kondaveeti Simham | | |
| 1981 | Jeevitha Ratham | Rammurthy | |
| 1982 | Iddaru Kodukulu | | |
| 1982 | Kayyala Ammayi Kalavari Abbayi | Rangalingam | |
| 1982 | Bangaru Kanuka | | |
| 1982 | Vamsa Gouravam | Lingaiah | |
| 1982 | Mondi Ghatam | | |
| 1982 | Krishnavataram | | |
| 1982 | Billa Ranga | | |
| 1982 | Nipputo Chelagaatam | Gajapati | |
| 1982 | Idi Pellantara | | |
| 1982 | Bangaru Bhoomi | Kasulayya | |
| 1982 | Subhalekha | | |
| 1982 | Bobbili Puli | | |
| 1982 | Justice Chowdary | | |
| 1982 | Golconda Abbulu | | |
| 1982 | Kalavari Samsaram | | |
| 1982 | Bangaru Koduku | Gurunatham | |
| 1983 | Sangharshana | | |
| 1983 | Mantri Gari Viyyankudu | | |
| 1983 | Simham Navvindi | | |
| 1983 | Chattaniki Veyi Kallu | Simhadri | |
| 1983 | Rajkumar | | |
| 1983 | Moogavani Paga | Kanakaiah | |
| 1983 | Prema Pichollu | | |
| 1983 | Adavi Simhalu | | |
| 1983 | Mundadugu | | |
| 1983 | Rendu Jella Sita | | |
| 1983 | Kanthayya Kanakayya | Kanthayya | |
| 1983 | Lanke Bindelu | Papaiah | |
| 1984 | Bava Maradallu | | |
| 1984 | Kanchu Kagada | | |
| 1984 | Anubandham | | |
| 1984 | Hero | | |
| 1984 | Kathanayakudu | | |
| 1984 | Danavudu | | |
| 1984 | Tandava Krishnudu | | |
| 1984 | Ooha Sundari | | |
| 1984 | Mukkopi | | |
| 1984 | Rustum | | |
| 1984 | Inti Guttu | | |
| 1984 | Srimadvirat Veerabrahmendra Swami Charitra | | |
| 1984 | Mahanagaramlo Mayagadu | | |
| 1984 | Srimathi Kaavali | | |
| 1984 | Hero | | |
| 1984 | Goonda | Kailasam | |
| 1984 | Bobbili Brahmanna | Muthyalu | |
| 1984 | Nayakulaku Saval | M.L.A. Lingam | |
| 1984 | Dandayatra | Seshadri | |
| 1984 | Bangaru Kapuram | Chalapathi | |
| 1985 | Vijetha | | |
| 1985 | Tirugubatu | | |
| 1985 | Adavi Donga | | |
| 1985 | Maharaju | | |
| 1985 | Agni Parvatham | | |
| 1985 | Illale Devata | | |
| 1985 | Bangaru Chilaka | Gopanna | |
| 1985 | Jwala | Pattabhi | |
| 1985 | Puli | Narasimham | |
| 1985 | Donga | | |
| 1985 | Chattamtho Poratam | Brahmaiah | |
| 1985 | Muchataga Mugguru | | |
| 1986 | Chantabbai | | |
| 1986 | Jayam Manade | Doubt Ramaswamy | |
| 1986 | Oka Radha Iddaru Krishnulu | | |
| 1986 | Simhasanam | | |
| 1986 | Nireekshana | | |
| 1986 | Apoorva Sahodarulu | | |
| 1986 | Jayam Manade | | |
| 1986 | Rakshasudu | | |
| 1986 | Ugra Narasimham | | |
| 1986 | Magadheerudu | | |
| 1986 | Kirathakudu | | |
| 1986 | Ravana Brahma | | |
| 1986 | Kaliyuga Krishnudu | | |
| 1986 | Jailu Pakshi | | |
| 1987 | Dharmapatni | | |
| 1987 | Punnami Chandrudu | | |
| 1987 | Donga Mogudu | | |
| 1987 | Trimurthulu | | |
| 1987 | Rowdy Babai | | |
| 1987 | Bharatamlo Arjunudu | | |
| 1987 | Garjinchina Ganga | | |
| 1987 | Chakravarthy | | |
| 1987 | Pasivadi Pranam | | |
| 1988 | Khaidi No.786 | | |
| 1988 | Aakhari Poratam | | |
| 1988 | Yamudiki Mogudu | | |
| 1988 | Mugguru Kodukulu | | |
| 1988 | Brahma Putrudu | | |
| 1988 | Manchi Donga | | |
| 1988 | Yuddha Bhoomi | | |
| 1988 | Nyayam Kosam | Pothuraju | |
| 1988 | Donga Ramudu | | |
| 1988 | Chikkadu Dorakadu | | |
| 1989 | State Rowdy | Quotation Chakravathy | |
| 1989 | Vintha Dongalu | Deepala Pichayya | |
| 1989 | Lankeshwarudu | | |
| 1989 | Vijay | | |
| 1989 | Joo Lakataka | | |
| 1989 | Agni | | |
| 1989 | Athaku Yamudu Ammayiki Mogudu | | |
| 1989 | Bala Gopaludu | | |
| 1989 | Chalaki Mogudu Chadastapu Pellam | | |
| 1990 | Nari Nari Naduma Murari | | |
| 1990 | Rowdyism Nasinchali | | |
| 1990 | Raja Vikramarka | | |
| 1990 | Aggi Ramudu | | |
| 1990 | Kodama Simham | | |
| 1990 | Yama Dharmaraju | | |
| 1990 | Jagadeka Veerudu Athiloka Sundari | | |
| 1990 | Kondaveeti Donga | | |
| 1991 | Rowdy Alludu | | |
| 1991 | Naa Pellam Naa Ishtam | | |
| 1991 | Niyantha | Ramakoti | |
| 1991 | Gang Leader | | |
| 1991 | Nirnayam | | |
| 1992 | Dabbu Bhale Jabbu | | |
| 1992 | Subba Rayudu Pelli | | |
| 1992 | Aapathbandavudu | | |
| 1992 | Killer | | |
| 1992 | Pranadaata | | |
| 1992 | Chanti | | |
| 1992 | Aswamedham | | |
| 1992 | Peddarikam | | |
| 1992 | Aa Okkati Adakku | | |
| 1993 | Muta Mesthri | | |
| 1993 | Nippu Ravva | | |
| 1993 | Matru Devo Bhava | | |
| 1993 | Mechanic Alludu | | |
| 1993 | Bangaru Bullodu | Kannappa | |
| 1993 | Mogudugaru | Kotilingam | |
| 1994 | Parugo Parugu | | |
| 1994 | Bangaru Kutumbam | | |
| 1994 | Gandeevam | | |
| 1994 | Kaadhalan | | Tamil film |
| 1994 | S. P. Parasuram | | |
| 1994 | Maga Rayudu | | |
| 1995 | Bhale Bullodu | | |
| 1995 | Alluda Majaka | | |
| 1995 | Big Boss | | |
| 1996 | Maavichiguru | | |
| 1996 | Akkada Ammayi Ikkada Abbayi | | |
| 1997 | Devudu | | |
| 1997 | Nenu Premisthunnaru | | |
| 1998 | Choodalani Vundi | | |
| 1999 | Neti Gandhi | | |
| 2000 | Devullu | | |
| 2001 | Thank You Subba Rao | | |
| 2002 | Indra | | |
| 2002 | Premaku Swagatam | | |
| 2003 | Kalyana Ramudu | | |
| 2004 | Jai | | |
