= Mikkilineni (actor) =

Indian actor (1914–2011)

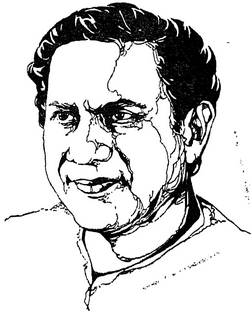
- Born: Mikkilineni Radhakrishna Murthy; 7 July 1914; Krishna District, Madras Presidency, British India (now Andhra Pradesh, India)
- Died: 23 February 2011 (aged 96); Vijayawada, Andhra Pradesh, India
- Occupation: Actor
- Years active: 1948–1994

Mikkilineni Radhakrishna Murthy (7 July 1914 - 23 February 2011) was an Indian actor and thespian known for his work predominantly in Telugu cinema. He was one of the founding members of the theater group Praja Natya Mandali. He received the honorary degree of Kalaprapoorna from Andhra University, for his contributions towards Telugu theater and cinema.

== Early life and career ==
He was born in Kolavennu village, Krishna District of Andhra Pradesh. Before entering into theater, he studied Diploma in Veterinary Science. He started his film career with the 1949 film Deeksha directed by K. S. Prakash Rao. He has acted in nearly 350 feature films and was known for his association with N. T. Rama Rao in near 150 films and in almost all the B. Vittalacharya movies.

== Awards ==
- Nandi Awards
- Filmfare Awards South

== Other honors ==
- Rashtrapati Award from Govt of India (1965)
- Kalaprapoorna from Andhra University (1965)

== Selected filmography ==
=== Actor ===
- 1996 Sri Krishnarjuna Vijayam as Dhritarashtra
- 1994 Bhairava Dweepam
- 1993 Srinatha Kavi Sarvabhowmudu
- 1991 Brahmarshi Vishwamitra
- 1991 Sri Yedukondala Swamy
- 1988 Dorakani Donga
- 1987 Dharmapatni
- 1987 Muddayi as Collector
- 1987 Rotation Chakravarthy
- 1987 Sankharavam
- 1987 Allari Krishnayya
- 1986 Santhi Nivasam as Raghupathi
- 1986 Aakrandana as Judge
- 1986 Aatmabalam
- 1986 Maruthi
- 1985 Vishakanya as Kapala Bhairava's guru
- 1985 Maa Inti Mahalakshmi as Lawyer A.K. Murthy
- 1985 Aggiraju
- 1984 Naagu
- 1984 Babulugaddi Debba
- 1984 Bhale Ramudu as Ranga Rao
- 1984 Danavudu
- 1984 Bharatamlo Sankharavam
- 1984 Rustum
- 1984 Tandava Krishnudu
- 1984 Koteeswarudu as Narayana
- 1983 Muddula Mogudu as Madhu's father
- 1983 Puli Debba as Nalini's foster father
- 1983 Chattaniki Veyi Kallu as Police Chief
- 1983 Puli Bebbuli
- 1983 Bezawada Bebbuli
- 1983 Nijam Chepite Nerama as Rajasekhara Rao
- 1982 Bangaru Bhoomi as Rao Bahadur Raja Venkatdri Jamindar
- 1982 Pralaya Rudrudu as Coast Guard, Vijay's father
- 1982 Bobbili Puli
- 1982 Anuraga Devatha
- 1982 Prema Nakshatram
- 1981 Jathagadu
- 1981 Jeevitha Ratham
- 1980 Bebbuli as Rangaiah, Lalitha's grandfather
- 1980 Sivamethina Satyam as Cycle Shop Owner
- 1980 Pelli Gola as Judge
- 1980 Kiladi Krishnudu as Ramachandra Rao
- 1980 Chuttalunnaru Jagratha
- 1980 Sita Ramulu
- 1980 Kaksha
- 1980 Mama Allulla Saval
- 1980 Punnami Naagu
- 1980 Ram Robert Rahim
- 1979 Sri Madvirata Parvam
- 1979 Gandharva Kanya as Amatya of Avanthipura
- 1979 Hema Hemeelu
- 1978 Dongala Veta as Raja Rao
- 1978 Dudu Basavanna as Village Head
- 1978 Sati Savitri
- 1978 Sri Rama Raksha
- 1977 Daana Veera Soora Karna
- 1977 Khaidi Kalidasu as David
- 1977 Chiranjeevi Rambabu as Dharmaiah
- 1976 Sita Swayamvar
- 1976 Bhale Dongalu
- 1976 Seeta Kalyanam
- 1975 Yashoda Krishna (1975) as Ugrasena
- 1975 Aadavalu Apanindhalu
- 1974 Galipatalu
- 1974 Uttama Illalu (1974) as Madhava Rao
- 1973 Meena as Purushottam
- 1973 Minor Babu
- 1973 Desoddharakulu
- 1973 Palletoori Chinnodu
- 1973 Dabbuki Lokam Dasoham
- 1972 Badi Panthulu
- 1972 Pandanti Kapuram
- 1972 Praja Nayakudu
- 1972 Monagadostunnadu Jagratha as Bhupathi
- 1972 Nijam Nirupistha as Hakim
- 1972 Sri Krishna Satya
- 1972 Bala Mitrula Katha
- 1972 Bala Bharatam
- 1971 Pavitra Hrudayalu
- 1971 Adrusta Jathakudu
- 1971 Pattindalla Bangaram as Appa Rao
- 1971 Debbaku tha Dongala Mutha
- 1971 Sisindri Chittibabu
- 1971 Sampoorna Ramayanam
- 1970 Suguna Sundari Katha as Kashmeera Bhoopathi
- 1970 Balaraju Katha
- 1969 Kathanayakudu
- 1969 Sipayi Chinnayya
- 1969 Devudichina Bhartha
- 1969 Nindu Hrudayalu
- 1969 Ekaveera
- 1969 Bhale Thammudu
- 1969 Varakatnam
- 1969 Gandikota Rahasyam
- 1969 Aggi Veerudu
- 1969 Kadaladu Vadaladu
- 1969 Sri Rama Katha as Janaka
- 1968 Devakanya
- 1968 Manchi Kutumbam
- 1968 Veeranjaneya as Vibhishana
- 1968 Baghdad Gaja Donga
- 1968 Kalisochina Adrushtam
- 1967 Chikkadu Dorakadu
- 1967 Devara Gedda Manava (Kannada)
- 1966 Palnati Yuddham
- 1966 Paduka Pattabhishekam as Guha
- 1966 Adugu Jaadalu
- 1966 Srikakula Andhra Maha Vishnu Katha
- 1966 Pidugu Ramudu
- 1965 Veerabhimanyu as Indra
- 1965 Prameelarjuneeyam
- 1965 Satya Harishchandra (Kannada)
- 1965 Antastulu
- 1965 C.I.D.
- 1965 Pandava Vanavasam
- 1964 Babruvahana
- 1964 Manchi Manishi as Veerayya
- 1964 Desa Drohulu
- 1964 Ramudu Bheemudu
- 1964 Pooja Phalam
- 1964 Gudi Gantalu
- 1963 Somavara Vrata Mahatyam
- 1963 Nartanasala as Yudhishtira
- 1963 Aapta Mitrulu
- 1963 Valmiki
- 1963 Valmiki (Kannada)
- 1963 Tirupathamma Katha
- 1963 Lakshadhikari
- 1963 Somavara Vrata Mahatyam as Chitra Varma
- 1963 Bandipotu as Veeranayaka
- 1963 Paruvu Prathishta
- 1963 Sri Krishnarjuna Yuddhamu as Balarama
- 1962 Kula Gotralu
- 1962 Mahamantri Timmarasu
- 1962 Gundamma Katha
- 1962 Dakshayagnam as Brahma
- 1962 Gulebakavali Katha
- 1961 Usha Parinayam
- 1961 Jagadeka Veeruni Katha as Indra
- 1961 Sita Rama Kalyanam as Janaka
- 1960 Anna Chellelu as Yerranna
- 1960 Renukadevi Mahatyam
- 1960 Sahasra Siracheda Apoorva Chintamani Vijayaketu, father of Apoorva Chinthamani
- 1960 Pillalu Thechina Challani Rajyam as Soorasena
- 1958 Anna Thammudu
- 1958 Appu Chesi Pappu Koodu
- 1957 Sarangadhara
- 1957 Mayabazar
- 1956 Tenali Ramakrishna
- 1955 Santhanam
- 1955 Donga Ramudu
- 1954 Menarikam
- 1954 Parivartana
- 1953 Kanna Talli
- 1953 Puttillu
- 1952 Palletooru
- 1948 Deeksha
