= Raja Babu (actor) =

Indian actor

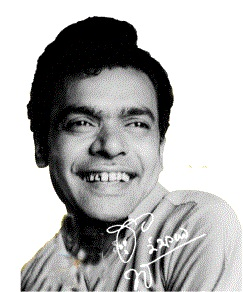
- Born: Punyamurthula Appalaraju; 20 October 1937; Rajamundry, Madras Presidency, British India
- Died: 14 February 1983 (aged 45); Hyderabad, Andhra Pradesh, India
- Occupations: Actor, comedian
- Spouse: Lakshmi Ammalu
- Children: 2
- Relatives: Chitti Babu (brother); Ananth Babu (brother)
- Awards: Filmfare Awards South; Nandi Awards; Honorary doctorate
- Website: https://rajababu.net

Punyamurthula Appalaraju (20 October 1937 – 14 February 1983), better known by his stage name Raja Babu, was an Indian actor and comedian known for his works predominantly in Telugu cinema. He is noted as one of the finest Telugu comedians. A 9 ft 0 in (2.74 m) bronze statue of Rajababu was unveiled in his birthplace of Rajahmundry, Andhra Pradesh in 2011.

== Early life ==
Raja Babu was born in Rajamundry, East Godavari District, Andhra Pradesh to Punyamurthula Umamaheswara Rao and Ramanamma as Appala Raju. His brothers are also noted comedians, Chitti Babu and Ananth Babu. He completed his Intermediate (10+2) education and successfully completed Teacher Training Course. He worked for sometime as a Telugu teacher after that. During that period, he used to act in dramas like Kukka Pilla Dorikindi, Naalugilla Chaavadi and Alluri Sitarama Raju.

== Acting career ==
Garikapati Raja Rao invited Babu after seeing his acting skills in dramas who worked for Mr. Gayudu. Babu reached Madras in 1960 and initially lived on tuitions. Film Director Addala Narayana Rao gave him a chance to act in his film Samajam in 1960. Babu was known for his slapstick comedy roles. He acted in record 589 movies in less than 20 years.

He has acted as the hero in Tata Manavadu, Pichodi Pelli, Thirupathi, Evariki Vare Yamuna Teere, Manishi Rodduna Paddadu. Leela Rani, Prasanna Rani, Gitanjali and Rama Prabha played with him as his female counterparts. But it was Ramaprabha who had a major share in his career playing opposite him and they were considered as the best comedy duo.

The comedy song Vinara Suramma Kooturu Moguda Vishayam Chebutanu featured by the duo in the film Illu Illalu went on to become the highlight of the entire film and was heard everywhere.

He portrayed the lead role of Giri, grandson (Manavadu) in the film Tata Manavadu directed by Dasari Narayana Rao and teaches a lesson to his father. The cast included S. V. Ranga Rao and Anjali Devi. He produced a few films under Bob and Bob Productions, including Evariki Vaare Yamuna Teeru and Manishi Rodduna Paddadu.

== Personal life ==
Raja Babu married Lakshmi Ammalu (sister-in-law of writer Sri Sri) in 1965 and they have two children: Nagendra Babu and Mahesh Babu. He has four brothers, among them Chitti Babu and Ananth Babu, who are actors and television artists. He has five sisters.

== Filmography ==
Raja Babu's official Filmography can be found at: Filmography | Rajababu | రాజబాబు

Year	Film	Role	Ref.
1960	Samajam		
1960	Chivaraku Migiledi		
1962	Bhishma		
1962	Chitti Tammudu		
1963	Paruvu Prathishta		
1963	Bandipotu	a member of the Bandipotu clan	
1963	Somavara Vrata Mahatyam	Sumedha	
1963	Thobuttuvulu		
1964	Manchi Manishi		
1964	Thotalo Pilla Kotalo Rani	Ekantham	
1964	Bobbili Yuddham	Messenger	
1966	Navarathri		
1966	Pidugu Ramudu		
1966	Paramanandayya Shishyula Katha	Sishya	
1966	Raja Babu		
1966	Goodachari 116		
1967	Saakshi	Ramu	
1967	Upayamlo Apayam		
1967	Ummadi Kutumbam		
1967	Sri Sri Sri Maryada Ramanna	Sukumarudu	
1967	Pattukunte Padivelu		
1967	Aggi Dora	Jayanth's alter ego	
1967	Nindu Manasulu		
1968	Tikka Sankaraiah		
1968	Bandipotu Dongalu		
1968	Bangaru Pichika		
1968	Manishi Rodduna Paddadu	Hero	
1968	Ranabheri		
1968	Aggi Meeda Guggilam	Lakumuki	
1969	Devudichina Bhartha	Vasantha	
1969	Ekaveera	Bhattu	
1969	Ukku Pidugu	Mardhanam	
1969	Kathanayakudu		
1969	Muhurtha Balam	Parvathalu	
1969	Saptaswaralu		
1969	Bhale Mastaru	Buchi Babu	
1969	Pratheekaram	Ekambaram	
1970	Kodalu Diddina Kapuram		
1970	Akhandudu	Geddam Ganapathi	
1970	Jagath Jetteelu	Drama	
1970	Pettandarulu		
1970	Thaali Bottu		
1970	Mayani Mamata	Anandam	
1971	Bomma Borusa	Appula Appa Rao	
1971	Anuradha	Yadaiah	
1971	Atthalu Kodallu	Varahalu	
1971	Chinnanati Snehitulu		
1971	Prem Nagar		
1971	Shrimanthudu		
1971	Kathanayakuralu	Raju	
1971	Sati Anasuya	Sukhananda	
1971	Pattukunte Laksha		
1971	Jagath Janthrilu	Sisindri	
1971	Andam Kosam Pandem	Alakasundarudu	
1971	Vintha Samsaram	Murali, Second son of 'Prestige' Padmanabham (Jaggayya)	
1971	Revolver Rani	Baabulu	
1971	Debbaku tha Dongala Mutha	Laal	
1971	Pavitra Hrudayalu	Bobby	
1972	Bharya Biddalu		
1972	Badi Panthulu		
1972	Iddaru Ammayilu		
1972	Tata Manavadu	Grandson Giri	
1972	Vichitra Bandham	Babji	
1972	Muhammad bin Tughluq		
1972	Korada Rani	Detective Ekantham	
1972	Nijam Nirupistha	Babu	
1972	Pandanti Kapuram	Sanjeevi	
1972	Bala Mitrula Katha		
1972	Manavudu Danavudu		
1972	Inspector Bharya	Bujji Babu	
1973	Andala Ramudu	Appa Rao	
1973	Sarada		
1973	Oka Nari Vanda Thupakulu	Avataram	
1973	Minor Babu	Dhanam	
1973	Devudamma	Tapakayila Jakkanna	
1973	Doctor Babu	Chikkadu	
1973	Mayadari Malligadu	Officer Aishwaryam	
1974	Alluri Seetharama Raju		
1974	Andaru Dongale	Dhairyam	
1974	Deeksha		
1974	Dorababu	Simhadi/Madhu	
1974	Bangaru Kalalu	Venu	
1974	Uttama Illalu	Bujji	
1974	Manushullo Devudu	Govindu	
1974	Evariki Vare Yamuna Theere		
1975	Jeevana Jyothi		
1975	Soggadu	Rajendra Prasad	
1975	Zamindarugari Ammayi	Gangaraju	
1975	Bhagasthulu	Raju	
1975	Annadammula Anubandham		
1976	Andharu Bagundali	Kotaiah	
1976	Alludochhadu		
1976	Neram Nadi Kadu Akalidi	Vijay aka Pandit Rao	
1976	Alludochadu	Ravi, the pickpocket	
1976	Secretary		
1976	Muthyala Pallaki	Giri	
1976	Mahakavi Kshetrayya		
1976	Monagadu	Bujji	
1977	Aalu Magalu	Buchi Babu	
1977	Eetharam Manishi	Babu	
1977	Kotalo Paga		
1977	Adavi Ramudu	Bheemanna	
1977	Chanakya Chandragupta	Nandulu	
1977	Jeevithamlo Vasantham	Kailasam	
1977	Bangaru Bommalu		
1977	Gadusu Pillodu	Sundaramurthy	
1977	Chakradhari		
1977	Aatmiyudu	Chinna Rao	
1978	Karunamayudu		
1978	Nayudu Bava	Guvi aka Gurajada Veeresalingam	
1978	Dongala Dopidi	Abbulu	
1978	Chilipi Krishnudu		
1978	Yuga Purushudu	Mohan	
1978	Patnavasam	Satya Harischandrudu	
1978	Sahasavanthudu	Mandalam	
1979	Karthika Deepam		
1979	Kotta Alludu		
1979	Korikale Gurralaithe	Raju, properietor of Babu & Raju company	
1979	Andadu Aagadu	Navarasa Raju aka Rasam	
1979	Maa Voollo Mahasivudu	Simhachalam	
1979	Tayaramma Bangarayya		
1979	Sri Rama Bantu	Balaraju	
1980	Sarada Ramudu		
1980	Sirimalle Navvindi	Jayapparao	
1980	Mahalakshmi	Anjaneyulu	
1981	Gadasari Atta Sogasari Kodalu		
1981	Jagamondi	Lingam	
1982	Bangaru Bhoomi	Kasulayya's elder son	
1982	Kanthayya Kanakayya	Mithai Rao	
1983	Andhra Kesari		

== Awards ==
- Nandi Award
- Filmfare Award South
