= Samudrala Jr. =

Screenwriter for Telugu films based in Andhra Pradesh, India

- Born: Samudrala Venkata Ramanujacharyulu; 15 April 1923; Andhra Pradesh, India
- Died: 31 May 1985 (aged 61–62)
- Occupation: Screenwriter
- Notable work: Grand son (samudrala srinivaas)
- Parent: Samudrala Sr. (Father)

Samudrala Venkata Ramanujacharyulu, better known as Samudrala Jr. (1923 – 31 May 1985), was an Indian screenwriter and lyricist known for his works in Telugu cinema. He is the son of screenwriter Samudrala Raghavacharya, better known as Samudrala Sr.

== Filmography ==
1. Bratuku Teruvu (1953 film) (lyricist)
2. Thodu Dongalu (1954) (dialogue)
3. Panduranga Mahatyam (1957)
4. Sahasra Siracheda Apoorva Chinthamani (1960) (adaptation) (dialogue)
5. Sabash Raja (1961) (dialogue) (story)
6. Bhishma (1962)
7. Gulebakavali Katha (1962) (adaptation) (dialogue)
8. Paruvu Prathishta (1963) (dialogue)
9. Pidugu Ramudu (1966)
10. Bhama Vijayam (1967)
11. Bala Bharatam (1972)
12. Neramu Siksha (1973) (dialogues and lyrics)
13. Shri Datta Darshanam (1985)
