= List of Telugu films of 1978 =

This is a list of Telugu films in the year 1978.

Title	Director	Cast	Notes
Agent Gopi	K. S. R. Das	Krishna, Jaya Prada, Kaikala Satyanarayana, M. Prabhakar Reddy	
Angadi Bomma	V. Madhusudhana Rao	Narasimharaju, Anjali Devi, Seema, G. V. Narayana Rao	
Annadammula Savaal	K. S. R. Das	Krishna, Rajinikanth, Jayachitra, Chandrakala	
Athani Kante Ghanudu			
Bommarillu	Rajachandra	Murali Mohan, Mohan Babu, Sreedhar, Jayanthi, Eswara Rao	
Chal Mohana Ranga	B. Bhaskar	Krishna, Mohan Babu, M. Prabhakar Reddy, Sowkar Janaki, Deepa	
Chali Cheemalu	Devadas Kanakala	Nutan Prasad, Rallapalli	
Cheppindi Chestha	M. S. Gopinath	Krishna, Jayachitra, Latha	
Chilipi Krishnudu	B. Subba Rao	Akkineni Nageswara Rao, Vanisree	
Chiranjeevi Rambabu	T. Prakash Rao	Ranganath, Manjula, Jamuna	
Devadasu Malli Puttadu	Dasari Narayana Rao	Akkineni Nageswara Rao, Vanisree, Jaya Prada, Gummadi	
Dongala Dopidi	M. Mallikarjuna Rao	Krishna, Mohan Babu, Sreedhar, Giribabu, Kanchana	
Dongala Veta	K. S. R. Das	Krishna, Jaya Prada, Jaggayya, Pandari Bai	
Doo Doo Basavanna	B. V. Prasad	Chalam, Deepa	
Enki Naidu Bava	B. Subba Rao	Sobhan Babu, Mohan Babu, Jayasudha, Jaya Prada	
Gamattu Gudachari	Singeetham Srinivasa Rao	Ranganath	
Gorantha Deepam	Bapu	Mohan Babu, Vanisri	
Indradhanassu	K. Bapayya	Krishna, Saradha	
Jaganmohini	B. Vittalacharya	Jayamalini, Narasimha Raju, Dhulipala, Prabha, Sarathi	
Kalanthakulu	K. Viswanath	Sobhan Babu, Jayasudha, Rao Gopal Rao, Kaikala Satyanarayana	
Karunamayudu	A. Bhimsingh	Vijayachander, Jaggayya	
Katakataala Rudraiah	Dasari Narayana Rao	Krishnam Raju, Jayasudha, Jayachitra, Satyanarayana Kaikala, Rao Gopal Rao	
KD No:1	K. Raghavendra Rao	N. T. Rama Rao, Jayasudha, Anjali Devi	
Khaidi No. 77	V. Hanuman Prasad	Murali Mohan, Deepa, Eeshwara Rao	
Kondura	Shyam Benegal	Ananth Nag, Vanisri	
Kumara Raja	P. Sambasiva Rao	Krishna, Jaya Prada, Mohan Babu	
Lawyer Viswanath	S. D. Lal	N. T. Rama Rao, Jayasudha	
Mallepoovu	V. Madhusudhana Rao	Sobhan Babu, Lakshmi, Jayasudha, Rao Gopal Rao	
Mana Voori Pandavulu	Bapu	Chiranjeevi, Krishnam Raju, Murali Mohan, Geetha, Rao Gopal Rao	
Manchi Babai	T. Krishna	Sobhan Babu, Jayachitra, Jayasudha	
Maro Charitra	K. Balachander	Kamal Haasan, Saritha, Sarath Babu, Madhavi	
Melu Kolupu	B. V. Prasad	N. T. Rama Rao, Jaya Prada, K. R. Vijaya, Kaikala Satyanarayana	
Muggure Mugguru	S. D. Lal	Krishna, Mohan Babu, Jayachitra, Jayamalini	
Naalaaga Endaro	Eeranki Sharma	Hemasundar, Janaki, Lakshmi Kanth, P. L. Narayana	
Nayudu Bava	P. Chandrashekara Reddy	Sobhan Babu, Jaya Prada, Jayasudha	
Nindu Manishi	S. D. Lal	Sobhan Babu, Jayachitra, Deepa, Chalam, Kaikala Satyanarayana	
Oka Oori Katha	Mrinal Sen	Mamata Shankar, M. V. Vasudeva Rao, G. V. Narayana Rao	
Padaharella Vayasu	K. Raghavendra Rao	Sridevi, Chandra Mohan, Mohan Babu	
Patnavasam	P. Chandrashekar Reddy	Krishna, Vijaya Nirmala	
Pottelu Punnamma	R. Thyagarajan	Mohan Babu, Murali Mohan, Sripriya	
Pranam Khareedu	K. Vasu	Jayasudha, Chandra Mohan, Chiranjeevi, Rao Gopal Rao, Madhavi	
Prema Chesina Pelli	Vijaya Nirmala	Chandra Mohan, Zarina Wahab, Ranganath, Pandari Bai	
Radha Krishna	V. Madhusudhana Rao	Sobhan Babu, Jaya Prada	
Rajaputra Rahasyam	S. D. Lal	N. T. Rama Rao, Jaya Prada	
Rama Krishnulu	V. B. Rajendra Prasad	Akkineni Nageswara Rao, N. T. Rama Rao, Jaya Prada, Jayasudha	
Ramachilaka	Singeetham Srinivasa Rao	Chandra Mohan, Vanisri, Ranganath, Fatafat Jayalakshmi	
Rickshaw Raji	D. S. Prakash Rao	Jayachitra, Chandra Mohan, Roja Ramani	
Rowdy Rangamma	Vijaya Nirmala	Vijaya Nirmala, Savitri, Chandra Mohan	
Sahasavanthudu	K. Bapaiah	N. T. Rama Rao, Vanisri, Pandari Bai, Gummadi	
Sati Savitri	B. Subba Rao	N. T. Rama Rao, Krishnam Raju, Vanisri	
Seetamalakshmi	K. Viswanath	Chandra Mohan, Talluri Rameshwari, Sreedhar, Tulasi	
Simha Baludu	K. Raghavendra Rao	N. T. Rama Rao, Vanisri, Jayamalini	
Simha Garjana	Kommineni	Krishna, Anjali Devi, Latha, Mohan Babu	
Sivaranjani	Dasari Narayana Rao	Jayasudha, Mohan Babu, Murali Mohan, Allu Ramalingaiah	
Sommokadidi Sokokadidi	Singeetam Srinivasa Rao	Kamal Haasan, Jayasudha, Roja Ramani	
Sri Rama Pattabhishekam	N. T. Rama Rao	N. T. Rama Rao, Jamuna, Sangeeta, Kanchana, M. Prabhakar Reddy	
Sri Rama Raksha	T. Rama Rao	Akkineni Nageswara Rao, Vanisri, Jayasudha, Jaggayya, Giribabu	
Sri Renukadevi Mahatyam	C. S. Rao	B. Saroja Devi, Gummadi, Anjali Devi	
Surya Chandrulu	V. C. Guhanathan	Chandra Mohan, Vijaya Nirmala	
Vayasu Pilichindi	C. V. Sridhar	Kamal Haasan, Rajinikanth, Sripriya, Jayachitra	
Vichitra Jeevitham	V. Madhusudhana Rao	Akkineni Nageswara Rao, Vanisri	
Yuga Purushudu	K. Bapayya	N. T. Rama Rao, Jaya Prada	
