= Takkari Donga Chakkani Chukka =

1969 Telugu film by K. S. R. Das

- Directed by: K. S. R. Das
- Story by: Vasanthi
- Produced by: Y. V. Rao
- Dialogues by: Tripuraneni Maharadhi
- Starring: Krishna; Vijaya Nirmala
- Cinematography: S. S. Lal
- Edited by: K. S. R. Das
- Music by: Satyam
- Production company: Ravi Chitra Films
- Release date: 16 May 1969
- Country: India
- Language: Telugu

Takkari Donga Chakkani Chukka (transl. The wily thief and the charming chick) is a 1969 Indian Telugu-language action-crime film directed and edited by K. S. R. Das. Produced by Y. V. Rao (Y. Venkat Rao) under Ravi Chitra Films, the film features Krishna in a dual role alongside Vijaya Nirmala.

This film marked Y. V. Rao's debut as an independent producer, following his previous work at Gauri Productions. It also served as the first collaboration between K. S. R. Das and Krishna, who would go on to work together on over 30 films. Released on 16 May 1969, the film received positive reviews.

== Plot ==
In a rural setting, two rival gang leaders, Dada (Rajanala) and Bhayankar (Satyanarayana), operate criminal rackets. Shyam (Krishna), a member of Bhayankar's gang, steals a set of rare Paritala diamonds from a museum and hides them in a ceiling fan in his hotel room.

Meanwhile, Gopi (also played by Krishna), a rickshaw puller struggling to make ends meet, encounters Syam, who offers him ₹50,000 to impersonate him for a month. Gopi accepts the offer, and Syam disappears. The gang leaders, unaware of the switch, pursue Gopi, believing he has the diamonds. The situation worsens when Syam is found dead in the hotel room, leaving Gopi to navigate the chaos and uncover the truth.

Simultaneously, a scientist Kailasnath (P. J. Sarma) and his assistant Geeta (Vijaya Nirmala) develop a formula to strengthen military men, which becomes a target for the criminals. Gopi steps up to protect Geeta and the formula, ultimately handing it over to the government. The film concludes with Gopi earning recognition and uniting with Geeta with his mother's approval.

== Cast ==
- Krishna in dual role as Gopi and Syam
- Vijaya Nirmala as Geeta
- Rajanala as Dada
- Satyanarayana as Bhayankar
- Raja Babu as Chinnayya
- Vijaya Lalitha as Laila
- Meena Kumari as Kannamma
- Dhulipala as Deputy superintendent of police
- P. J. Sarma as scientist Kailasnath
- Tyagaraju as Circle Inspector Kamesam
- Malathi as Gopi's mother
- Jyothi Lakshmi

== Production ==
Y. V. Rao, a journalist and producer affiliated with magazines such as Tempo and Detective, launched his film production venture, Ravi Chitra Films, with Takkari Donga Chakkani Chukka. K. S. R. Das, who began his career in the editing department, later transitioned to direction, making his debut with Loguttu Perumallukeruka in 1966. In 1969, producer V. V. Rao selected him to direct Takkari Donga Chakkani Chukka. Krishna who was close to Y. V. Rao was selected for the lead role.

The narrative combines high-stakes action with elements of crime and sentiment. Key sequences include a museum heist, Gopi's escape from gang dens, and a climactic fight on moving train compartments. K. S. R. Das's distinctive approach to action filmmaking was evident in these well crafted scenes.

== Music ==
The film's soundtrack, composed by Satyam, featured lyrics by noted writers including C. Narayana Reddy, Dasarathi, and Arudra. The comedic number "Nene Malishwala," performed by Raja Babu, was particularly well received.

Track list
No.	Title	Lyrics	Singer(s)	Length
1.	"O Kalalugane"	Dasarathi	S. P. Balasubrahmanyam, P. Suseela
2.	"Killadi Mamayya"	C. Narayana Reddy	L. R. Eswari
3.	"Nene Malishwala"	Aarudra	Pithapuram Nageswara Rao
4.	"Nee Nadakalu Chuste"	C. Narayana Reddy	S. P. Balasubrahmanyam
5.	"Nuvvu Nenu Inkevvaru Leru"	C. Narayana Reddy	P. Suseela
6.	"Vayasu Kurradi Vampulunnadi"	Aarudra	L. R. Eswari and group

== Reception ==
Takkari Donga Chakkani Chukka received praise for its engaging storyline and action sequences. Vijaya of Visalaandhra gave the film a positive review.

However, its box office performance was reported differently by various sources. While Andhra Bhoomi reported that the film performed well, Andhra Jyothi mentioned that the film's commercial success was hindered due to a cyclone affecting Andhra Pradesh at the time of its release.

== Legacy ==
The film laid the groundwork for future collaborations between K. S. R. Das and Krishna. Their partnership continued in successful films such as Mosagallaku Mosagadu (1971) and Dongalaku Donga (1977), the former becoming a milestone in Indian cinema.

Krishna's son, Mahesh Babu, starred in Takkari Donga (2002), a Western film that honours the 1969 original through its title, though the plots differ. Krishna also features in that film in a guest role.
