= Nippulanti Manishi (1974 film) =

- Theatrical release poster
- Directed by: S. D. Lal
- Written by: Gollapudi (dialogues)
- Based on: Zanjeer by Salim–Javed
- Produced by: Y. V. Rao
- Starring: N. T. Rama Rao; Latha
- Cinematography: S. S. Lal
- Edited by: K. Balu
- Music by: Satyam
- Production company: Ravi Chitra Films
- Release date: 25 October 1974
- Running time: 161 minutes
- Country: India
- Language: Telugu

Nippulanti Manishi (transl. Fire-like Man) is a 1974 Indian Telugu-language action film directed by S. D. Lal and produced by Y. V. Rao. It stars N. T. Rama Rao and Latha, with music composed by Satyam. A remake of the Hindi film Zanjeer (1973), it became a silver jubilee hit and played a role in revitalizing Rama Rao's career. Following its success, Rama Rao acted in additional remakes of popular Amitabh Bachchan films, including Neram Nadi Kadu Akalidi (1976), which was also produced by Y. V. Rao.

== Cast ==
- N. T. Rama Rao as Inspector Vijay
- Latha as Lakshmi
- Satyanarayana as Sher Khan
- Prabhakar Reddy as Jagadish Chandra Prasad
- Relangi as David
- Raja Babu as Head Constable Tirupati & Rocket (dual role)
- Rajanala as Narendra Varma
- Devika as Janaki
- Kanta Rao as Police Inspector
- Dr. Sivaramakrishnayya as Seth the Pawnbroker
- Balakrishna as Gangulu
- Balaji as Raghu, Vijay's elder brother
- Tyagaraju as Pratap
- Pemmasani Ramakrishna as Kabir
- Bhimaraju as Nagulu
- Anand Mohan as Malligadu
- Chalapathi Rao as Anti-Corruption Bureau Official
- Vijayasree as Rani
- K. K. Sarma as Subbaiah

== Soundtrack ==
The soundtrack was composed by Satyam. The songs "Snehame Naa Jeevitam" and "Welcome Swagatam" are based on "Yari Hai Imaan Mera" and "Dil Jaloon Ka" from Zanjeer.

S.No	Song title	Lyrics	Singers	length
1	"Kattiki Sana"	C. Narayana Reddy	P. Susheela	4:20
2	"Welcome Swagatam"	Aarudra	L. R. Eswari	3:52
3	"Orabbi Orabbi"	Aarudra	S. P. Balasubrahmanyam, P. Susheela	3:29
4	"Yedo Anukunnanu"	C. Narayana Reddy	P. Susheela	3:34
5	"Snehame Naa Jeevitam"	C. Narayana Reddy	S. P. Balasubrahmanyam	6:13
