= Niluvu Dopidi =

1968 film by C. S. Rao

- Theatrical release poster
- Directed by: C. S. Rao
- Screenplay by: Tripuraneni Maharadhi
- Story by: U. Visweswara Rao
- Produced by: U. Visweswara Rao
- Starring: N. T. Rama Rao; Krishna; Devika; Jayalalita
- Cinematography: G. K. Ramu
- Edited by: R. Hanumantha Rao
- Music by: K. V. Mahadevan
- Production company: Manjula Cine Syndicate
- Release date: 25 January 1968
- Running time: 146 minutes
- Country: India
- Language: Telugu

Niluvu Dopidi (transl. Complete Robbery) is a 1968 Indian Telugu-language comedy drama film, produced by U. Visweswara Rao and directed by C. S. Rao. It stars N. T. Rama Rao, Krishna, Devika and Jayalalita, with music composed by K. V. Mahadevan. The film was released on 25 January 1968 and became a commercial success.

== Cast ==
- N. T. Rama Rao as Ramu
- Krishna as Krishna
- Devika as Janaki
- Jayalalita as Radha
- V. Nagayya as Swamiji
- Relangi as Venkataramaiah
- Nagabhushanam as Bhushanam
- Kantha Rao as the minister
- Rajanala as Sarpanch
- Dhulipala Seetarama Sastry as Sarpanch
- M. Prabhakar Reddy as Sarpanch
- Padmanabham as Lingam
- Suryakantham as Chukamma
- Hemalatha as Sheshamma

== Production ==
After the success of the folklore film Kanchu Kota (1967), its producer U. Visweswara Rao and director C. S. Rao decided to make their next venture a contemporary film under the same banner Manjula Cine Syndicate. Kanchu Kota's lead actors N. T. Rama Rao and Devika were retained for the new film, titled Niluvu Dopidi. Visweswara Rao wrote the story which Tripuraneni Maharadhi, the film's screenwriter, read and noticed was strongly influenced by Gundamma Katha (1962). Maharadhi felt Visweswara Rao's story was outdated, so he reworked it to its final form. Visweswara Rao's initial choice for the second male lead was Sobhan Babu, but later chose Krishna at the insistence of Maharadhi, who felt he would match Rama Rao's "jubilance". J. Jayalalithaa was cast as the second female lead, paired alongside Krishna. Kantha Rao, who appeared in Kanchu Kota, was dismayed upon realising there was no role for him in Niluvu Dopidi and insisted on an appearance; he was offered to act as a minister and willingly accepted. The cinematography was handled by G. K. Ramu and the art direction by S. Krishna Rao, while editing was handled by R. Hanumantha Rao. The song "Aadapillalante Hoi Hoi", choreographed by Thangappa, was shot at the Madras-based Golden Studios in September 1967.

== Soundtrack ==
The soundtrack was composed by K. V. Mahadevan.

Track listing
No.	Title	Lyrics	Singer(s)	Length
1.	"Lokam Idhi Lokam"	Daasarathi Krishnamacharyulu	P. Susheela	5:18
2.	"Aadapillalante Hoi Hoi"	C. Narayana Reddy	P. Susheela	3:58
3.	"Chukkamma Athayyaro Bul Bul Bul"	U. Visweswara Rao	Ghantasala	4:30
4.	"Ayyalara O Ammalara"	Kosaraju Raghavaiah	Nazaar, Vallam Narasimham	6:21
5.	"Nee Bandaram Paina Pataaram"	Aarudhra	Pithapuram Nageswara Rao, L. R. Eswari	3:45
6.	"Nene Dhanalakshmini"	Sri Sri	L. R. Eswari, Pithapuram Nageswara Rao, Madhavapeddi Satyam	7:24
7.	"Jeevulenubadhinalgu Lakshala Chaavu Puttuka lIkkada"	Kosaraju Raghavaiah	Madhavapeddi Satyam	2:44
8.	"Ayyindhi Ayyindhi Anukunnadi"	Acharya Aatreya	Ghantasala, P. Susheela	3:42
Total length:				37:42

== Release and reception ==
Niluvu Dopidi was released on 25 January 1968 and became a commercial success.
