= Gopaludu Bhoopaludu =

- Theatrical release poster
- Directed by: G. Viswanatham
- Written by: Palagummi Padma Raju (dialogues)
- Screenplay by: S. Bhavanarayana
- Story by: S. Bhavanarayana
- Produced by: S. Bhavanarayana; Y. V. Rao
- Starring: N. T. Rama Rao; Jayalalitha; Rajasree
- Cinematography: H. S. Venu
- Edited by: K. S. R. Das
- Music by: S. P. Kodandapani
- Production company: Gauri Productions
- Release date: 13 January 1967
- Running time: 170 minutes
- Country: India
- Language: Telugu

Gopaludu Bhoopaludu (transl. Shepherd and King) is a 1967 Indian Telugu-language swashbuckler film, produced by S. Bhavanarayana and Y. V. Rao under the Gauri Productions banner and directed by G. Viswanatham. It stars N. T. Rama Rao, Jayalalithaa and Rajasree, with music composed by S. P. Kodandapani.

== Cast ==
- N. T. Rama Rao as Raja and Gopi (dual role)
- Jayalalitha as Rajini
- Rajasree as Padmavathi Devi
- Rajanala as Veerabahu
- Satyanarayana as Bheemanna
- Padmanabham as Kopiri
- Allu Ramalingaiah as Mahanasa
- Mikkilineni as Sripathi
- Prabhakar Reddy as Kunthala Maharaju
- Jagga Rao as Bandi
- S. Varalakshmi as Raja Maata
- Hemalatha as Mangamma
- Vanisri as Madhuram

== Soundtrack ==
Gopaludu Bhoopaludu

Film score by S. P. Kodandapani
- Released: 1967
- Genre: Soundtrack
- Producer: S. P. Kodandapani

Music composed by S. P. Kodandapani.

S. No.	Song title	Lyrics	Singers	length
1	"Idena Idena"	C. Narayana Reddy	T. M. Sounderarajan	2:27
2	"Kotaloni Chinnavada"	C. Narayana Reddy	Ghantasala, P. Susheela	4:23
3	"Uyyalo Uyyalo"	C. Narayana Reddy	S. Janaki, Latha	4:03
4	"Okasari Kalaloki"	Aarudhra	Ghantasala, P. Susheela	4:30
5	"Entha Bagunadhi"	C. Narayana Reddy	Ghantasala, P. Susheela, S. Janaki	4:17
6	"Choodaku Choodaku"	C. Narayana Reddy	Ghantasala, P. Susheela	5:28
7	"Maradhala"	C. Narayana Reddy	Pithapuram, L. R. Eswari	3:55
8	"Jim Jim Jintadi"	C. Narayana Reddy	P. Susheela	4:04
