= Y. V. Rao (disambiguation) =

Y. V. Rao could refer to one of the following people:

- Y. V. Rao (Yaragudipati Varada Rao), Indian film director, actor, and screenwriter
- Y. V. Rao (producer and journalist) (Y. Venkat Rao), Indian film producer and journalist
