= Nakili Manishi =

- Theatrical release poster
- Directed by: S. D. Lal
- Written by: Gollapudi Maruthi Rao (dialogues); Kommuri Sambasiva Rao (novel)
- Produced by: Y. V. Rao
- Starring: Chiranjeevi, Sangeetha
- Cinematography: M. G. R. Mani; S. S. Lal
- Edited by: D. Rajagopal Rao
- Music by: Satyam
- Production company: Ravichitra Films
- Release date: 1 August 1980
- Country: India
- Language: Telugu

Nakili Manishi (transl. Fake Guy) is a 1980 Telugu-language film. This movie starred Chiranjeevi, in a dual role, Sangeeta, Suneeta and Satyanarayana. The film is based on the novel Nenu Chavanu by Kommuri Sambasiva Rao. It released on 1 August 1980.

== Plot ==
Prasad (Chiranjeevi), a middle-class man, loses his job due to his honesty. Unable to get a job and to have to feed his family, he agrees to die for the money. Rama (Suneeta), who hires him to die, pays money for it. But in the last minute, Prasad wants to live, and with the help of Gangaraju (Satyanarayana), he hides in a safe place. Syam (Chiranjeevi), a look-alike of Prasad, is a crook who murders Gangadhar Rao with the help of Rama for the property and hides the money. Suseela (Kavitha), who is in love with Syam, sees the murder and loses her sanity. Suseela is a sister of Gangaraju. Rama wants to plan the murder of Prasad in an accident so that Syam can roam freely in the name of Prasad. But the plan backfires and how Syam and Rama end up and how Gangaraju and Prasad take revenge is the rest of the story.

== Cast ==
- Chiranjeevi... Prasad & Syam [dual role]
- Sangeeta
- Suneetha
- Jayamalini
- Kaikala Satyanarayana
- M. Prabhakar Reddy... guest role
- Rajanala... guest role
