= Mattilo Manikyam =

- Directed by: B. V. Prasad
- Written by: Rajasri
- Produced by: Chalam
- Starring: P. Bhanumathi; Chalam; Jamuna; Dhulipala; Prabhakar Reddy
- Music by: Satyam
- Release date: 1971
- Country: India
- Language: Telugu

Mattilo Manikyam (Telugu: మట్టిలో మాణిక్యం) is a 1971 Telugu drama film directed by B. V. Prasad and produced by the actor Chalam. The film won National Film Award for Best Feature Film in Telugu in 1971.

== Cast ==
- P. Bhanumathi as Lalitha
- Chalam as Manikyam
- Jamuna as Lakshmi
- Dhulipala as Mallayya
- Prabhakar Reddy as Raghavaiah
- Padmanabham as Namam, Manikyam's friend
- Geetanjali as Subbulu
- Rajanala as Bhujanga Rao
- Kaikala Satyanarayana as Bheemayya
- Balakrishna as Drunkard
- Rushyendramani as Lalitha's grandmother
- Sakshi Ranga Rao as Seethapathi aka Panthulu, Mallayya's accountant
- Potti Prasad as Ramayya, Manikyam's friend
- Sarathi as Manikyam's friend
- P.J. Sarma as Father of Lakshmi's best friend
- Mohana as Damayanthi
- Venkateswara Rao as Ranganayakulu
- K.V. Chalam as Lakshmi's collegemate
- Jagga Rao as Kodandam
- Prasanna Rani as Manga
- Nalla Ramamurthy as Polayya, Lalitha's househelp
- Modhukuri Satyam as Govindu, Lion Dance Performer

== Soundtrack ==
- "Saranam Nee Divya Charanam Nee Naamamento Madhuram" (Singer: Bhanumathi)
- "Malli Malli Padali Ee Paata" (Lyrics: Mylavarapu Gopi; Singer: P. Susheela)
- "Naa Maate Nee Maatai Chadavali" (Lyrics: Aathreya; Singers: S. P. Balasubrahmanyam and P. Susheela)
- "Rimjhim Rimjhim Hyderabad" (Lyrics: C. Narayana Reddy; Singer: S. P. Balasubrahmanyam)
- "Vasthe Istha Naa Moogamanasu" (Lyrics: RajasriSingers: Pithapuram Nageswara Rao and L. R. Eswari)
- "Palletoori Baithugadu" (Lyrics: Rajasri Singers: S. P. Balasubrahmanyam and P. Susheela)
