= Aradhana (1976 film) =

- Theatrical release poster
- Directed by: B. V. Prasad
- Written by: Gollapudi(dialogues)
- Screenplay by: B. V. Prasad
- Story by: Ramanand Sagar
- Based on: Geet (Hindi)
- Produced by: A. Pundarikakshaiah
- Starring: N. T. Rama Rao; Vanisri
- Cinematography: J. Satyanarayana
- Edited by: Kandaswamy
- Music by: Saluri Hanumantha Rao
- Production company: Sri Bhaskara Chitra
- Release date: 1976
- Running time: 165 minutes
- Country: India
- Language: Telugu

Aradhana (transl. Worship) is a 1976 Indian Telugu-language romantic musical film directed by B. V. Prasad. It stars N. T. Rama Rao and Vanisri, with music composed by Saluri Hanumantha Rao. It is produced by produced by A. Pundarikakshayya under the Sri Bhaskara Chitra banner. The film was a remake of the Bengali film Chirodiner (1969).

== Cast ==
- N. T. Rama Rao as Gopi
- Vanisri as Radha
- Jaggayya as Sudhakar
- Gummadi as Dasaradha Ramayya
- Prabhakar Reddy
- Rajanala as Doctor
- Sakshi Ranga Rao as Driver
- Mada Venkateswara Rao as Cook
- K. V. Chalam
- Jaya Bhaskar
- Vijayalalitha as Janaki
- Suryakala
- Pushpa Kumari
- Parvathi
- Anupama
- P. J. Sarma

== Soundtrack ==
Music composed by Saluri Hanumantha Rao. The song "Mere Mitwa Mere Meet Re" from the original film was retained here as "Naa Madi Ninnu Pilichindi".

S. No	Song title	Lyrics	Singers	length
1	"Naa Madi Ninnu Pilichindi"	C. Narayana Reddy	Mohammed Rafi, S. Janaki	4:42
2	"Gadasari Bulloda"	Dasaradhi	S. Janaki	2:32
3	"Nede Thelisindhi"	C. Narayana Reddy	Mohammed Rafi, S. Janaki	5:06
4	"Laila Majnu"	C. Narayana Reddy	Mohammed Rafi, S. Janaki	11:01
5	"Neekaela Intha Niraasa"	Dasaradhi	S. Janaki	4:58
6	"Neekaela Intha Niraasa"	Dasaradhi	Mohammed Rafi	1:44
7	"O Priyatama"	C. Narayana Reddy	Mohammed Rafi	3:33
