= Sri Rama Bantu =

- Theatrical release poster
- Directed by: I. N. Murthy
- Written by: N Sambandam; Gollapudi Maruthi Rao
- Produced by: Y. V. Rao
- Starring: Chiranjeevi; Mohan Babu; Hari Prasad
- Music by: Satyam
- Release date: 3 August 1979
- Country: India
- Language: Telugu

Sri Rama Bantu is a 1979 Telugu film starring Chiranjeevi and Mohan Babu. It was produced by Y. V. Rao and was commercially successful.

== Cast ==
- Chiranjeevi as Raghuram
- Geetha as Seetha
- Mohan Babu as Nagaraju
- Raja Babu as Balaraju
- Ramana Murthy as Ramadasu
- Arja Janardhana Rao as Lord Hanuman
- Nagesh as Lord Hanuman
- Prabhakar Reddy as Rahim
- Potti Veeraiah as Nagaraju's henchman
- Pemmasani Ramakrishna as Gangulu
- Ceylon Manohar as Jacky
- Hari Prasad as Mohan
- Mukkamala as Chalapathi Rao
- Kalpana Rai as Durgamma
- K.V. Chalam as Panchayathi Member
- Potti Prasad as Panchayathi Member
- Jayamalini

== Soundtrack ==
No.	Title	Singer(s)	Length
1.	"Seethamma Siggupadindi"	P. Susheela
2.	"Na Menatha Kodaka"	S. Janaki
3.	"Ramabantu Nene"	S. P. Balasubrahmanyam
