= Siri Sampadalu =

- Theatrical release poster
- Directed by: P. Pullaiah
- Written by: Pinisetty Srirama Murthy (story / dialogues)
- Screenplay by: P. Pullaiah
- Produced by: V. Venkateswarlu
- Starring: Akkineni Nageswara Rao; Savitri
- Cinematography: Madhav Bulbule
- Edited by: N. M. Shankar
- Music by: Master Venu
- Production company: Padmasri Pictures
- Release date: 19 September 1962
- Running time: 155 minutes
- Country: India
- Language: Telugu

Siri Sampadalu (transl. Property and Wealth) is a 1962 Indian Telugu-language drama film, produced by V. Venkateswarlu and directed by P. Pullaiah. It stars Akkineni Nageswara Rao and Savitri, with music composed by Master Venu.

== Cast ==
- Akkineni Nageswara Rao as Prasad
- Savitri as Padma
- V. Nagayya as Raghupathi Naidu
- Gummadi as Jagapathi Naidu
- Relangi as AK Maar / Anand Kumar
- Ramana Reddy as Garatayya
- Rajanala as Bhujanga Rao
- Chalam as Madhu
- Chadalavada as Anjaiah
- Allu Ramalingaiah as Appanna
- Dr. Sivarama Krishnayya as Panakala Rao
- A. V. Subba Rao Jr. as Chakradharam
- Prabhakar Reddy as Doctor
- Santha Kumari as Parvathi
- Suryakantham as Bhadramma
- Girija as Rama
- Vasanthi as Latha
- Surabhi Balasaraswathi as Kondamma

== Soundtrack ==
Siri Sampadalu

Film score by Master Venu
- Released: 1962
- Genre: Soundtrack
- Length: 26:02
- Producer: Master Venu

Music composed by Master Venu.

S. No	Song title	Lyrics	Singers	length
1	"Chittipotti Papalu"	Acharya Aatreya	Santha Kumari	3:05
2	"Enduko Siggenduko"	Sri Sri	Ghantasala, P. Susheela	2:59
3	"Ee Pagalu"	Acharya Aatreya	Ghantasala, S. Janaki	3:00
4	"Venugaanammu Vinipinchene"	Kosaraju	Jikki, S. Janaki, P. Susheela	3:28
5	"Gudilo Devuni Gantalu"	Kosaraju	P. Susheela	3:01
6	"Puvvu Navvenu"	Acharya Aatreya	S. Janaki	2:57
7	"Varaniki Okkate Sunday"	Kosaraju	Pithapuram, S. Janaki	4:15
8	"Kondammo"	Kosaraju	P. B. Sreenivas, Swarnalatha	3:17

== Awards ==
National Film Awards

- National Film Award for Best Feature Film in Telugu - 1962
