= Harischandrudu =

- Directed by: U. Visweswar Rao
- Story by: U. Visweswara Rao
- Produced by: U. D. Murali Krishna
- Starring: Prabhakar Reddy; Jayachitra; Savitri; Banerjee; Devika
- Cinematography: Mohana Krishna
- Edited by: R. Hanumantha Rao
- Music by: T. Chalapathi Rao
- Release date: 6 June 1980
- Country: India
- Language: Telugu

Harischandrudu is a 1980 Telugu-language political drama film. The film was directed by U. Visweswar Rao. Jayachitra surprisingly sang a song in her own voice for herself MUTHUMANTA.

== Awards ==
National Film Awards

- National Film Award for Best Feature Film in Telugu - 1980
