= Nagna Sathyam =

- Directed by: U. Visweswar Rao
- Produced by: U. Visweswar Rao
- Starring: Ramprasad; Krishnaveni
- Distributed by: Deepthi International
- Release date: 28 April 1979
- Country: India
- Language: Telugu

Nagna Sathyam is a 1979 Telugu-lanuguage drama film directed by U. Visweswar Rao.

== Awards ==
National Film Awards

- National Film Award for Best Feature Film in Telugu - 1979
