= Desoddharakulu =

- Theatrical release poster
- Directed by: C. S. Rao
- Written by: Tripuraneni Maharadhi; Modukuri Johnson (dialogues)
- Screenplay by: C. S. Rao
- Story by: Viswa Shanti Unit
- Produced by: U. Visweswar Rao
- Starring: N. T. Rama Rao; Vanisri
- Cinematography: G. K. Ramu
- Edited by: R. Hanumantha Rao
- Music by: K. V. Mahadevan
- Production company: Deepthi International
- Release date: 29 March 1973
- Running time: 156 minutes
- Country: India
- Language: Telugu
- Box office: approx.₹7.5−8 million (equivalent to ₹270−280 millions in 2020)

Desoddharakulu (transl. Redeemers of the Country) is a 1973 Indian Telugu-language drama film, produced by U. Viswaswara Rao under the Deepthi International banner and directed by C. S. Rao. It stars N. T. Rama Rao and Vanisri, with music composed by K. V. Mahadevan. A superhit at the box office, the film was the second highest grossing Telugu film of 1973 after Devudu Chesina Manushulu.

== Cast ==
- N. T. Rama Rao as Gopal Rao
- Vanisri as Radha
- Nagabhushanam as Raja Bhushnam
- Satyanarayana
- Allu Ramalingaiah as Ganapathi
- Padmanabham as Devaiah
- Prabhakar Reddy as Commissioner Prabhakar Rao
- Mikkilineni as Raja Rao
- Dhulipala as Van Driver
- Rajanala as Tata Rao
- Mukkamala
- Tyagaraju
- Savitri as Lakshmi
- Raja Sulochana
- Shubha
- C.H. Narayana Rao as Inspector General of Police
- Nagayya as Dharma Rao
- Padma Khanna as Roja
- Chalapathi Rao as Inspector
- Rao Gopal Rao as C.I.D Officer

== Soundtrack ==
Desoddharakulu

Film score by K. V. Mahadevan
- Released: 1973
- Genre: Soundtrack
- Length: 32:09
- Producer: K. V. Mahadevan

K. V. Mahadevan chronology
Dabbuki Lokam Dasoham (1973)	Desoddharakulu (1973)	Manchivadu (1973)

Music composed by K. V. Mahadevan.

S. No.	Song title	Lyrics	Singers	length
1	"Mabbulu Rendu"	Acharya Aatreya	Ghantasala, P. Susheela	4:17
2	"Madi Madi Suchi Suchi"	Sri Sri	S. Janaki	3:57
3	"Intha Andam Enchesukuntanura"	Aarudhra	L. R. Eswari	3:34
4	"Swagathm Dora Suswagatam"	Modukuri Johnson	P. Susheela	4:11
5	"Korukunna Doragaru"	Acharya Aatreya	P. Susheela	4:00
6	"Ee Veenaku Sruthi Ledu"	Acharya Aatreya	P. Susheela	4:05
7	"Aakalayyi Annamadigithe"	U. Visweswara Rao	S. P. Balasubrahmanyam	4:32
8	"Idikadu Maa Sanskruthi"	C. Narayana Reddy	P. Susheela	3:27
