= Kanchu Kota =

- Theatrical release poster
- Directed by: C. S. Rao
- Written by: Tripuraneni Maharadhi
- Screenplay by: Maharadhi
- Produced by: U. Visweswara Rao
- Starring: N. T. Rama Rao; Kanta Rao; Savitri; Devika
- Cinematography: G. K. Ramu
- Edited by: R. Hanumantha Rao
- Music by: K. V. Mahadevan
- Production company: Viswashanti Productions
- Release date: 22 March 1967
- Country: India
- Language: Telugu

Kanchu Kota (transl. Bronze Fort) is a 1967 Indian Telugu-language swashbuckler film, produced by U. Visweswara Rao under the Viswashanti Productions banner and directed by C. S. Rao, written by Maharadhi Tripuraneni. It stars N. T. Rama Rao, Kanta Rao, Savitri and Devika, with music composed by K. V. Mahadevan.

== Cast ==
- N. T. Rama Rao as Surendra
- Kanta Rao as Narendra
- Savitri as Madhavi
- Devika as Jayanthi
- V. Nagayya as Rajendra Bhupathi
- Rajanala as Prachanda
- Dhulipala as Mahamantri Bhairavacharya
- Satyanarayana as Sowrya Varma
- Udaya Kumar as Vijayendra Bhupathi
- Ramana Reddy as Pullaiah
- Padmanabham as Bhaja Govindam
- Prabhakar Reddy as Marthanda
- Chadalavada as Kotilingam
- Balakrishna as Yallaiah
- Kanchana as Dancer
- Vanisri as Bangari
- L. Vijayalakshmi as Dancer
- Santha Kumari as Rajeswari Devi
- T. G. Kamala Devi as Vijayeswari Devi
- Jayasri as Dancer

== Soundtrack ==
Kanchu Kota

Film score by K. V. Mahadevan
- Released: 1967
- Genre: Soundtrack
- Length: 37:10
- Producer: K. V. Mahadevan

K. V. Mahadevan chronology
Prana Mitrulu (1967)	Kanchu Kota (1967)	Sakshi (1967)

Music composed by K. V. Mahadevan. Music released by Audio Company.

S. No.	Song title	Lyrics	Singers	length
1	"Uliki Uliki Padutondi"	Acharya Aatreya	P. Susheela	4:11
2	"Siggenduke Cheli"	Tripuraneni Maharadhi	P. Susheela, S. Janaki	3:30
3	"Ledu Ledani"	Acharya Aatreya	Ghantasala, P. Susheela	4:53
4	"Ee Puttina Roju"	Dasaradhi	P. Susheela	5:47
5	"Eedochina Pillanu"	Aarudhra	L. R. Eswari	3:46
6	"Bham Bham Bham"	Kosaraju	Pithapuram, K. Jamuna Rani	3:56
7	"Sarileru Neekevvaru"	C. Narayana Reddy	P. Susheela, S. Janaki	5:57
8	"Echatano Gala"	Dasaradhi	Ghantasala	1:01
9	"Ardharethiri Kaada"	U. Visweswara Rao	Chakravarthy, L. R. Eswari	4:09
