= Roti (1974 film) =

- Theatrical release poster
- Directed by: Manmohan Desai
- Written by: Kader Khan (dialogues); Anand Bakshi (lyrics)
- Screenplay by: Prayag Raj
- Story by: Smt. Jeevan Prabha; M. Desai
- Produced by: Rajni Desai; Rajesh Khanna
- Starring: Rajesh Khanna; Mumtaz
- Cinematography: K Vaikunth
- Edited by: Kamlakar Karkhanis
- Music by: Laxmikant Pyarelal
- Production company: Aashirwad Pictures Pvt.Ltd
- Release date: 11 October 1974
- Running time: 148 minutes
- Country: India
- Language: Hindi

Roti (transl. Flatbread) is a 1974 Indian Hindi-language action film directed by Manmohan Desai and produced by Rajni Desai and Rajesh Khanna under the banner Aashirwad Pictures Pvt. Ltd. It stars Khanna and Mumtaz, with music composed by Laxmikant Pyarelal. This film was released on 11 October 1974, along with Benaam and Roti Kapda Aur Makaan. Kader Khan was reportedly paid ₹1.21 lakhs for writing dialogues for the film. The film was remade in Telugu as Neram Nadi Kadu Akalidi, starring N.T. Rama Rao and Manjula.

== Plot ==
Mangal Singh has been a career criminal and he is finally sentenced to be hanged due to the murder of a man for the sake of roti. Underworld don, Suraj who raises him as a criminal, plans his escape from jail and is followed by a police inspector. He escapes on a train when he throws a fellow passenger Shravan Kumar off the train. Mangal Singh lands up in a small village in Northern India and becomes a school teacher with the help of a local restaurateur, Bijli. He takes on the identity of Ramu, a friend of Shravan, and goes to live with Shravan's parents, Lalaji and Malti who are blind, little knowing that they are the parents of a man he killed while escaping from the police.

Bijli falls in love with the reluctant Mangal, but she discovers the truth when inspector Jagdish Raj comes to search Mangal in the same village and informs the blind couple about Shravan's death due to Mangal. Finally, Mangal also learns the truth about Shravan's parents. Mangal reunites Lalaji's long-lost daughter with him, who thereby releases Shravan's house. Mangal takes Shravan's parents for a holy pilgrimage along with Bijli where he meets the alive Shravan again. He pardons him and allows him to escape from the police, but Bijli follows him. While in pursuit of Mangal, Suraj shoots Bijli, but he dies in the snow avalanche. Bijli dies and Mangal is shot by inspector Sujit. The inspector finds Mangal dying with a gun without cartridges asking none to deprive anyone of roti.

== Cast ==
- Rajesh Khanna as Mangal Singh
- Mumtaz as Bijli
- Jeetendra (Cameo)
- Vijay Arora as Shravan
- Nirupa Roy as Malti
- Jagdeep as Khadak Singh
- Pinchoo Kapoor as Suraj
- Sujit Kumar as Police Inspector
- Jagdish Raj as Police Inspector
- Viju Khote as Doctor
- Om Prakash as Lalaji
- Paintal as Headmaster
- Asrani as Ramu
- Jeevan as Lalaji
- Pravin Paul as Mrs Lalaji
- Kader Khan (Opening credits voice over)

== Soundtrack ==
The songs were composed by Laxmikant Pyarelal. The lyrics were written by Anand Bakshi.

#	Title	Singer(s)
1	"Yaar Hamari Baat Suno"	Kishore Kumar
2	"Yeh Public Hai"	Kishore Kumar
3	"Naach Meri Bulbul"	Kishore Kumar
4	"Gore Rang Pe Na Itna"	Kishore Kumar, Lata Mangeshkar
5	"Phoolon Ke Saath"	Lata Mangeshkar

== Box office ==
The film was a major box-office success of the year and considered to be a milestone in the formula-films made by Manmohan Desai. The film grossed ₹2 crore in India and ₹4 crore worldwide, which works out to ₹160 crore and ₹320 crore resp. in 2018.

== Remakes ==
The film is loosely inspired by the 1959 American Western film Face of a Fugitive (an adaptation of the short story "Long Gone" by Peter Dawson), vast changes were made in the script of Roti. Later, Roti itself was remade in Telugu as Neram Nadi Kadu Akalidi, in 1976 starring N.T. Rama Rao. It was also remade in Bangladesh as Ek Mutho Bhat (lit. 'One Fist Rice') starring Zafar Iqbal, Babita in 1976.

== Awards ==
- Filmfare Best Editing Award – Kamlakar Karkani
