= U. Visweswar Rao =

Indian film director (died 2021)

- Born: U. Visweswar Rao; Andhra Pradesh, India
- Died: 20 May 2021
- Occupation(s): Director; Screenwriter; Producer; Playwright
- Children: Dhananjaya Uppalapati

U. Visweswar Rao (died 20 May 2021) was an Indian film, screenwriter, director, producer and playwright known for his works predominantly in Telugu cinema.

== Biography ==
He was a member of the central jury for the 17th National Film Awards.

He was the secretary of the South Indian Film Chamber of Commerce. He has also served as the managing director of South Indian Film Export Promotion Council. He has garnered two National Film Awards, and two state Nandi Awards. He was also associated with the Nandi Awards jury, and has produced around twenty-five films.

Rao died from COVID-19 on 20 May 2021.

== Selected filmography ==
- Kanchu Kota(1967)
- Niluvu Dopidi (1968)
- Pettandarulu (1970)
- Desoddharakulu (1973)
- Nagna Sathyam (1979)
- Harischandrudu (1980)
- Keerthi Kantha Kanakan (1982)
- Pellila Chadarangam (1988)

== Awards ==
National Film Awards

- Best Feature Film in Telugu (director) - Nagna Sathyam (1979)
- Best Feature Film in Telugu (director) - Harischandrudu (1980)

Nandi Awards

- Best Director - Keerthi Kantha Kanakan (1982)
- Best Screenplay Writer - Pellila Chadarangam (1988)
