= Sri Simhachala Kshetra Mahima =

- Directed by: B. V. Prasad
- Written by: B. V. Prasad (story); Rajasri (dialogues)
- Starring: Kantha Rao; Krishna Kumari; V. Nagayya; Relangi; Girija; Rajanala; Chalam; G. Ramakrishna
- Music by: T. V. Raju
- Release date: 1965
- Country: India
- Language: Telugu

Sri Simhachala Kshetra Mahima is a 1965 Telugu Hindu devotional and mythological film written and directed by B. V. Prasad in his debut.

The film is based on the stories related to Sri Varaha Narasimha Kshetram of Simhachalam in Andhra Pradesh, India.

== Plot ==
The story begins with Mahavishnu in his Narasimha Avatar, killing Hiranyakashipu. Prahlada requests him to reduce his anger. Quieted, Narasimha blesses him. Prahlada requests him to show his Varaha avatar and to bless his devotees on the hill. Mahavishnu obliges him and takes the form of Varaha Narasimha.

== Cast ==
| Actor | Character |
|---|---|
| Kantha Rao | Pururava Chakravarthi |
| Krishna Kumari | Apsarasa Sirisha |
| V. Nagayya | Father of Pururava |
| G. Ramakrishna | Mahavishnu |
| Chalam | Narada |
| Rajanala Kaleswara Rao | Indra |
| Relangi | Anavasaram |
| Girija | Queen of the Women's Kingdom |

== Soundtrack ==
All lyrics are written by Rajasri; all music is composed by T. V. Raju.

Track listing
| No. | Title | Singer(s) | Length |
|---|---|---|---|
| 1. | "Andala O Sundara Anuragala" | P. Susheela, S. Janaki |
| 2. | "Baboo Biraana Kanipinchara Kanipinchi Naa Baadha Tholaginchara" | S. Janaki |
| 3. | "Chinnari Ponnari Vennela Raasi Jo Jo" | S. Janaki |
| 4. | "Haayiga Edo Teeyaga Naa Kalale Panda" | P. Susheela |
| 5. | "Jayahe Mohana Roopa Gaana Kalaapa" | P. B. Srinivas |
| 6. | "Neelaati Revukaada Neredu Chettuneeda" | L. R. Eswari |
| 7. | "O Deva Varaaha Mukha Nrusimha Sikha" | S. Janaki |
| 8. | "Oho Elika Ide Veduka Ee Vasantha Vinodalu Neeku Kaanuka" | P. Susheela |
| 9. | "Oppula Kuppa Vayyari Bhama Magaadu Pilichade" | Pithapuram Nageswara Rao, Swarnalata |
| 10. | "Raave Viribala Dari Raave Eevela" | P. B. Srinivas |
| 11. | "Raavoyi Raaja Kanaraavoyi Raaja" | S. Janaki, P. B. Srinivas |
| 12. | "Simhachalamu Mahaa Punya Kshetramu" | Ghantasala |
