= Neram Nadi Kadu Akalidi =

- Theatrical release poster
- Directed by: S. D. Lal
- Written by: Gollapudi (dialogues)
- Screenplay by: S. D. Lal
- Story by: Smt. Jeevan Prabha; M. Desai
- Based on: Roti (Hindi) by Manmohan Desai
- Produced by: Y. V. Rao
- Starring: N. T. Rama Rao; Manjula
- Cinematography: P. Devaraj
- Edited by: K. Balu
- Music by: Satyam
- Production company: Ravi Chitra Films
- Release date: 22 July 1976
- Running time: 149 minutes
- Country: India
- Language: Telugu

Neram Nadi Kadu Akalidi (transl. The crime is not mine; it is hunger's) is a 1976 Indian Telugu-language action drama film, produced by Y. V. Rao under the banner Ravi Chitra Films and directed by S. D. Lal. It stars N. T. Rama Rao and Manjula, with music composed by Satyam. It is a remake of the Hindi-language film Roti (1974), starring Rajesh Khanna and Mumtaz. It was commercially successful.

== Cast ==
- N. T. Rama Rao as Vikram/Vijay
- Manjula as Gowri
- Gummadi as Raghavaiah
- Murali Mohan as Sravan Kumar
- Prabhakar Reddy as S. P. Rao
- Giri Babu as Kailash
- Tyagaraju as Ranjith
- Padmanabham as Head Constable Meesala Venkata Swamy
- Allu Ramalingaiah as Punyakoti
- Raja Babu as Vijay aka Pandit Rao
- Kanta Rao as Sriramulu, Vikram's father
- Mukkamala as Jailor
- Dr. Sivaramakrishnaiah as Doctor
- Balakrishna
- Chitti Babu
- K. K. Sarma
- Pandari Bai as Seeta, Sravan's mother
- Ramana Murthy as Public prosecutor
- Jaya Malini as item number
- Shetty as Goon who fights with Vikram for a Roti
- Prabha as Lakshmi
- T. G. Kamala Devi as Rukmini, Punyakoti's wife
- Arudra as Judge
- Ram Mohan as Police Officer
- Bhimaraju as Ranjith's henchman
- Pemmasani Ramakrishna as Ranjith's henchman

== Soundtrack ==
Neram Nadi Kadu Akalidi

Film score by Satyam
- Released: 1976
- Genre: Soundtrack
- Length: 23:39
- Producer: Satyam

Satyam chronology
Bhale Dongalu (1976)	Neram Nadi Kadu Akalidi (1976)	Naakoo Swaathanthryam Vachindhi (1976)

Music composed by Satyam.

S. No.	Song title	Lyrics	Singers	length
1	"Manchini Samaadhi Chesthara"	C. Narayana Reddy	S. P. Balasubrahmanyam	5:25
2	"Public Raa Idhi"	C. Narayana Reddy	S. P. Balasubrahmanyam	4:18
3	"Diamond Rani"	Aarudhra	S. Janaki	3:35
4	"Chekumuki Ravvaa"	C. Narayana Reddy	P. Susheela	6:00
5	"Oh Hyderabad Bulbul"	C. Narayana Reddy	S. P. Balasubrahmanyam	4:21
