= Oka Nari Vanda Tupakulu =

1973 Telugu film by K. V. S. Kutumba Rao

Oka Nari – Vanda Tupakulu
- Directed by: K. V. S. Kutumba Rao
- Story by: Smt. Y. Vasantha Rao
- Produced by: Y. V. Rao
- Starring: Vijaya Lalitha; Rajanala
- Cinematography: P. Devaraj
- Edited by: Balu
- Music by: Chellapilla Satyam
- Production company: Ravichitra Films
- Distributed by: Poorna Pictures
- Release date: 11 April 1973
- Country: India
- Language: Telugu

Oka Nari Vanda Tupakulu (transl. One woman, hundred rifles) is a 1973 Indian Telugu-language action film directed by K. V. S. Kutumba Rao and produced by Y. V. Rao under the banner of Ravichitra Films. The film stars Vijaya Lalitha as a courageous revolutionary leader and Rajanala as the antagonist, with music composed by Satyam.

Notable for being the first Telugu film to feature CinemaScope sequences, Oka Nari Vanda Tupakulu was primarily shot in black-and-white. However, the climactic scenes were filmed in colour and presented in CinemaScope, marking a technical experiment in Telugu cinema. The film blends action with a patriotic theme and was released on April 11, 1973. It was inspired by the 1969 American Western film 100 Rifles.

== Plot ==
Set in a tyrannical princely state, the film follows Bhavani, a young woman whose father and brother are brutally killed by the oppressive rulers. As the despotic regime intensifies its exploitation and repression of the people, Bhavani emerges as the leader of a revolutionary movement. Fueled by grief and anger, she becomes a beacon of hope for the oppressed, rallying the people to rise against their oppressors. Her journey to justice culminates in a dramatic confrontation with the regime.

== Cast ==
- Vijaya Lalitha as Bhavani
- Rajanala as Diwan
- Tyagaraju as Sardar
- Sivaramakrishnayya as Kotwal Kotilingam
- Raja Babu as Avataram
- Prabhakar Reddy
- Pemmasani Ramakrishna
- Bheemaraju
- G. Ratnam
- Subha
- Vijayabhanu
- Master Ramu
- Sowcar Janaki (guest appearance)
- Modukuri Satyam

== Production ==
Oka Nari Vanda Tupakulu was directed by K. V. S. Kutumbarao and written by Mrs. Y. Vasantha Rao. The dialogues were penned by Veetoori. The cinematography was handled by Devaraj, while the film's editing was done by Balu. The film, made in the style of a cowboy genre with a patriotic theme, starred Vijaya Lalitha as the lead. At the time of its production, crime and cowboy films were popular, and the filmmakers aimed to offer a unique experience to the audience.

The film was primarily shot in black-and-white, but the last two reels were filmed in colour and presented in CinemaScope. This decision was influenced by the increasing availability of colour film production and the introduction of some CinemaScope-equipped theatres in Andhra Pradesh. Special 35mm lenses were used for the film, with the climactic sequences filmed using CinemaScope, creating a dramatic effect as the film transitioned from black-and-white to colour.

Although Alluri Sitarama Raju, starring and produced by Krishna, became the first full CinemaScope film in Telugu cinema upon its release in May 1974, producer Y. V. Rao had already experimented with CinemaScope a year earlier in Oka Nari Vanda Tupakulu. Initially, Y. V. Rao had planned to shoot the entire film in CinemaScope. However, upon learning that there were only a few CinemaScope-equipped theatres in Andhra Pradesh at the time, he adjusted his plans. He intended to make the film in CinemaScope and print some copies in 35mm. However, due to the lack of processing facilities for such conversions in India, only the climax was filmed in CinemaScope, while 35mm prints were used for non-CinemaScope theatres, as the climax was shot in both formats.

Parts of the climax were filmed in Pulicat, 40 miles from Madras, over the course of a week, with the cast and crew traveling there by boat. Some sequences was also shot in Yercaud, in the Salem district, and one key sequence was filmed in the hills near Chengalpattu.

== Music ==
The soundtrack was composed by Chellapilla Satyam, featuring lyrics by Dasarathi, Arudra, Kosaraju, and Veetoori. The songs were well-received, with "Amma Narasamma Poolevamma" and "Eera Saamiranga Poora" gaining popularity.

Track list
No.	Title	Lyrics	Singer(s)	Length
1.	"Amma Narasamma Poolevamma"	Dasarathi	S. P. Balasubrahmanyam, Vasantha
2.	"Eera Saamiranga Poora"	Veetoori	P. Suseela and chorus
3.	"Chinta Chettu Needa Undira"	Kosaraju	L. R. Eswari
4.	"Maga Siri Chusthe Hai Bhayamaye"	Aarudra	S. Janaki
5.	"Aye Kanchi Kamachchamma"	Veetoori	S. Janaki

== Reception ==
The music by Chellapilla Satyam was praised, but Oka Nari Vanda Tupakulu did not achieve commercial success. The innovative use of colour and CinemaScope, made the film notable for its technical experimentation.
