= Y. V. Rao (producer and journalist) =

Indian film producer and journalist

- Born: Y. Venkat Rao; Rajahmundry, Andhra Pradesh, India
- Occupation(s): Film producer, journalist
- Years active: 1948–1984
- Known for: Action films and technical innovations in Telugu cinema

Y. Venkat Rao, commonly known as Y. V. Rao, was an Indian film producer and journalist known for his work in Telugu cinema. Active from the 1960s to the early 1980s, he produced around 25 films, working with notable actors such as Krishna, N. T. Rama Rao, and Chiranjeevi. Initially a journalist, Y. V. Rao managed the magazines Tempo, Film, and Rathi, before launching the successful crime fiction magazine Detective.

In the 1960s, Y. V. Rao transitioned into film production, initially working alongside his brother-in-law S. Bhavanarayana at Gauri Productions in films such as Gopaludu Bhupaludu (1967). He later founded his own production company, Ravi Chitra Films. His debut as an independent producer came with Takkari Donga Chakkani Chukka (1969), followed by hits such as Paga Saadhista (1970), Revolver Rani (1971), and Nippulanti Manishi (1974), which marked a career revival for N. T. Rama Rao, and Sri Rama Bantu (1979). Y. V. Rao was also known for his technical innovations, notably introducing CinemaScope sequences in Oka Naari Vanda Tupakulu (1973).

== Career ==
=== Early career ===
Y. V. Rao was born as Y. Venkata Rao in Rajahmundry, Andhra Pradesh. Circumstances forced him to leave school after completing his SSLC and join the Royal Indian Navy. After serving for a few years, he was discharged in 1947 and moved to Madras (now Chennai).

His film career began as a production manager for Suvarna Mala (1948), produced by his close associates. Although the film was a commercial failure, it introduced Y. V. Rao to the technical and managerial aspects of filmmaking.

=== Journalism ===
In 1949, Y. V. Rao joined Tempo, an English monthly magazine, under its editor, Tempo Rao. Impressed by Y. V. Rao's dedication to journalism, Tempo Rao entrusted him with managing the magazine and also assigned him responsibilities for Film, a monthly film magazine, and Rathi, a publication focusing on erotic stories.

Around the same time, Tempo Rao's brother, Subba Rao, established Kubera Press and handed it over to Tempo Rao for management. Tempo Rao invited Y. V. Rao to join him in this venture. In 1954, Y. V. Rao launched Detective, a monthly magazine specializing in crime investigation stories. Alongside the magazine, they published pocket-sized novels, which gained popularity. Kubera Press became well known for featuring detective stories penned by prominent writers of the time.

However, after the sale of Kubera Press, Y. V. Rao faced financial challenges. He later established Chitralekha Publicities, a company focused on film publicity, but it failed to succeed and incurred losses. Y. V. Rao then returned to Detective magazine, where he revitalized its operations and significantly increased its subscriber base in a short period. In addition to publishing stories from well-known writers, Y. V. Rao also contributed his own detective stories.

=== Film production ===
In 1963, Y. V. Rao joined his brother-in-law S. Bhavanarayana at Kausalya Productions and Gauri Productions. Over the next five years, he worked as a production manager for 12 films and was credited as a producer for the films produced under Gauri Productions. This period allowed Rao to gain substantial experience in filmmaking, which paved the way for his transition to independent film production.

However, due to differences with S. Bhavanarayana, Y. V. Rao had to leave Gauri Productions. This departure brought financial challenges, but Y. V. Rao remained determined to pursue his career in film production. With the support of his friends and past associates, including Poorna Films, which had distributed Gauri Productions' films, and N. N. Bajaj & Company, he established Ravi Chitra Films.

Y. V. Rao debuted as an independent producer with Takkari Donga Chakkani Chukka (1969), starring Krishna and Vijaya Nirmala. Despite the challenges posed by a cyclone during its release, the film marked the beginning of Y. V. Rao's successful production career. He followed it with hits like Paga Saadhista (1970) and Revolver Rani (1971), which gained popularity for their revenge-centric and action-driven narratives.

Y. V. Rao's next production, Monagadostunnadu Jagratha (1972), featured an extensive set in Chengalpattu, which became a notable talking point within the industry. Another significant project was Oka Naari Vanda Tupakulu (1973), starring Vijayalalitha in the lead role. The film was groundbreaking for its pioneering use of CinemaScope in the climax sequences, showcasing Rao's interest in technical innovation. While the majority of the film was shot in black-and-white, the climax was presented in both colour and CinemaScope, offering a distinctive experience for audiences at the time.

An admirer of N. T. Rama Rao, Y. V. Rao played a key role in revitalizing the actor's career after a slump by producing Nippulanti Manishi (1974), a successful remake of the Hindi film Zanjeer (1973). The film's success led to several remakes of Amitabh Bachchan’s popular films, including Neram Naadi Kadu Akalidi (1976), starring Rama Rao and Manjula, which also became a hit. Y. V. Rao later produced Lawyer Viswanath (1978), another CinemaScope film starring Rama Rao, though it underperformed commercially.

In the late 1970s, Y. V. Rao shifted focus to low-budget productions and collaborated with the emerging actor Chiranjeevi in Sri Rama Bantu (1979), which became successful. He continued his collaboration with Chiranjeevi on Nakili Manishi (1980), based on the novel Nenu Chavanu by Kommuri Sambasiva Rao. Y. V. Rao also worked with other popular stars, producing films like Pataalam Paandu (1981) with Mohan Babu and Nipputho Chelagaatam (1982) with Krishnam Raju. His final production was Punyam Koddi Purushudu (1984), starring Sobhan Babu and Jayasudha, after which he gradually distanced himself from the film industry.

== Personal life ==
Y. V. Rao married in March 1968. He is the brother-in-law of producer S. Bhavanarayana of Gauri Productions.

== Filmography ==
As producer
Year	Title	Notes	Ref.
1964	Thotalo Pilla Kotalo Rani		
1965	Aakasa Ramanna		
1966	Loguttu Perumaallu Keruka		
1966	Bhulokamlo Yamalokam		
1967	Gopaludu Bhupaludu		
1967	Devuni Gelichina Manavudu		
1968	Pala Manasulu		
1968	Circar Express		
1969	Love In Andhra		
1969	Takkari Donga Chakkani Chukka	Debut as an independent producer	
1970	Paga Saadhista		
1971	Revolver Rani		
1972	Monagadostunnadu Jagratha		
1973	Oka Naari Vanda Tupaakulu	Featured CinemaScope sequences	
1974	Nippulanti Manishi		
1976	Neram Nadi Kadu Akalidi		
1978	Lawyer Viswanath	CinemaScope film	
1979	Sri Rama Bantu		
1980	Nakili Manishi		
1981	Pataalam Paandu		
1982	Nipputho Chelagatam		
1984	Punyam Koddi Purushudu	Final production	
