= Melu Kolupu =

- Theatrical release poster
- Directed by: B. V. Prasad
- Written by: Gollapudi (dialogues)
- Screenplay by: B. V. Prasad
- Story by: Sharad Pilgaonkar
- Based on: Jagriti (1977)
- Produced by: A. Pundarikakshaiah
- Starring: N. T. Rama Rao; Jaya Prada; K. R. Vijaya
- Cinematography: M. A. Rehman
- Edited by: Kandaswany
- Music by: Master Venu
- Production company: Sri Bhaskara Chitra
- Release date: 13 January 1978
- Running time: 126 minutes
- Country: India
- Language: Telugu

Melu Kolupu (transl. Awakening) is a 1978 Telugu-language drama film written and directed by B. V. Prasad. The film stars N. T. Rama Rao, Jaya Prada and, K. R. Vijaya, with music composed by Master Venu. It is a remake of the Hindi film Jagriti (1977).

== Cast ==
- N. T. Rama Rao as Shekar
- Jaya Prada as Susheela
- K. R. Vijaya as Shanti Devi
- Nagabhushanam as Dayanidhi
- Prabhakar Reddy as Parabrahmam
- Padmanabham as Master
- Chalam as Chitti Babu
- Jaya Bhaskar as Doctor
- Jaya Malini as item number
- Halam as item number
- Master Raja Krishna as Ramu

== Soundtrack ==
Music composed by Master Venu.

Song title	Lyrics	Singers	length
"Palike Muvvalalo"	C. Narayana Reddy	P. Susheela	4:30
"Yendaro Mahanubhaavulu"	C. Narayana Reddy	P. Susheela	4:31
"Ide Melu Kolupu"	C. Narayana Reddy	S. Janaki	3:10
"Oyyalo Oyyalo"	Dasaradhi	Vasantha	3:02
"Kanaraani Neeve"	Dasaradhi	S. P. Balasubrahmanyam, P. Susheela	3:12
"Ide Melu Kolupu" - II	C. Narayana Reddy	S. Janaki, Vasantha	3:11
