= B. V. Prasad =

Indian film director (born 1931)

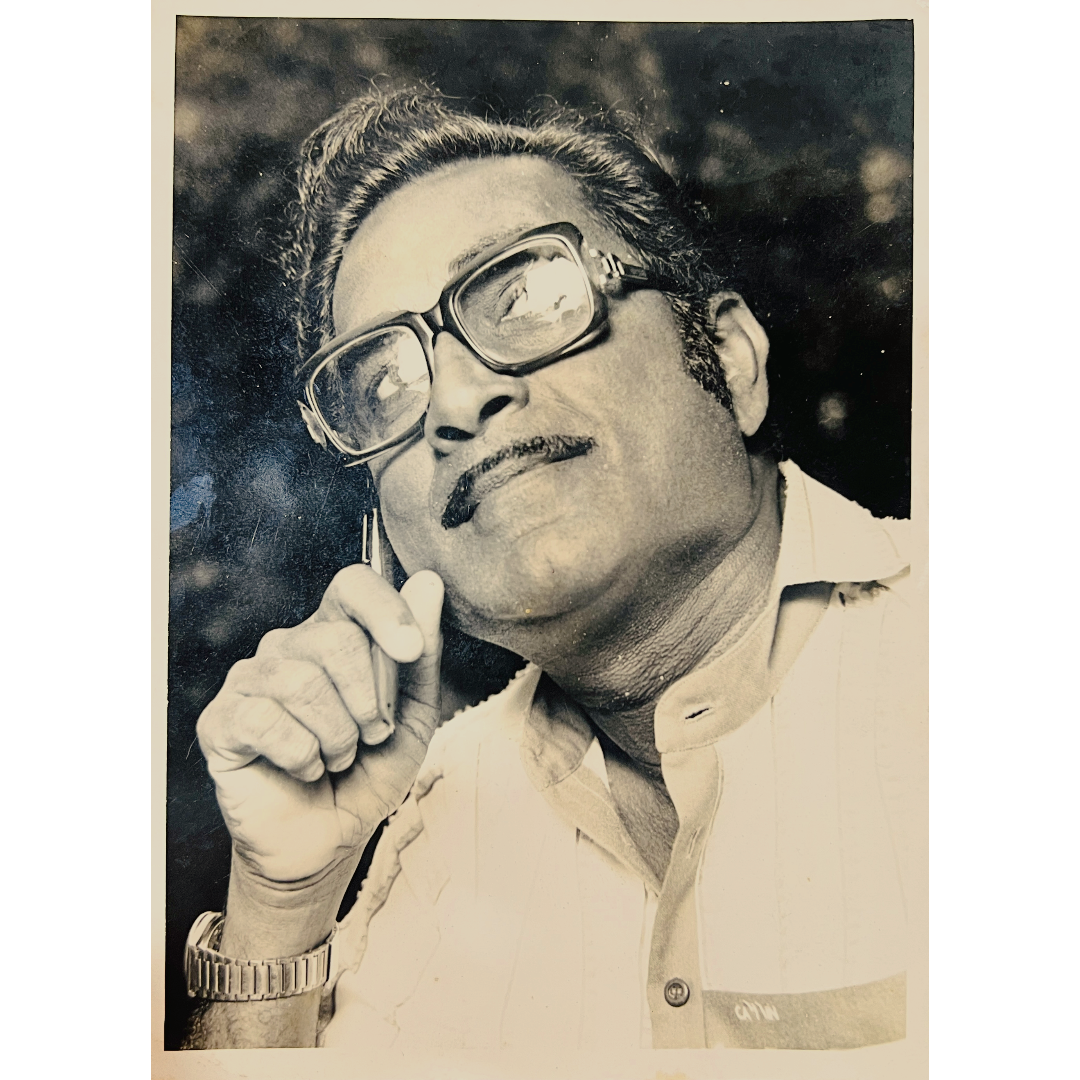
- Born: 11 September 1931 (age 95); Rajahmundry, Andhra Pradesh, India
- Occupations: Director; Producer
- Spouse: B Padmavathi
- Children: 6
- Relatives: Sai Marthand (Grandson)
- Awards: National Award, Best Telugu Language Film.

Barla Venkata Prasad (born 11 September 1931) is an Indian film director known for his works in Telugu cinema. In 1971, he directed Mattilo Manikyam which won the National Film Award for Best Feature Film in Telugu, for that year. He is the father of cinematographer, Prabhunath and also, paternal grandfather of Sai Marthand, director of the Telugu film Little Hearts (2025)

== Filmography ==
- 1965 Sri Simhachala Kshetra Mahima
- 1970 Amma Kosam
- 1971 Mattilo Manikyam
- 1972 Muhammad bin Tughluq
- 1974 Manushullo Devudu
- 1975 Thota Ramudu
- 1975 Ramayya Thandri
- 1976 Aradhana
- 1978 Melu Kolupu
- 1978 Prema Paga
- 1978 Doodoo Basavanna
- 1979 Lakshmi
- 1980 Thathayya Premaleelalu
- 1980 Snehamera Jeevitham
- 1980 Chuttalunnaru Jagratta
- 1981 Nayudugari Abbayyi
- 1983 Kurukshetramlo Sita
- 1985 Ooriki Soggadu
- 1986 Jeevana Raagam
- 1986 Dharmapeetam Daddarillindi

== Awards ==
National Film Awards

- National Film Award for Best Feature Film in Telugu (director) - Mattilo Manikyam (1972)
