= Rajanala (actor) =

Indian actor (1925–1998)

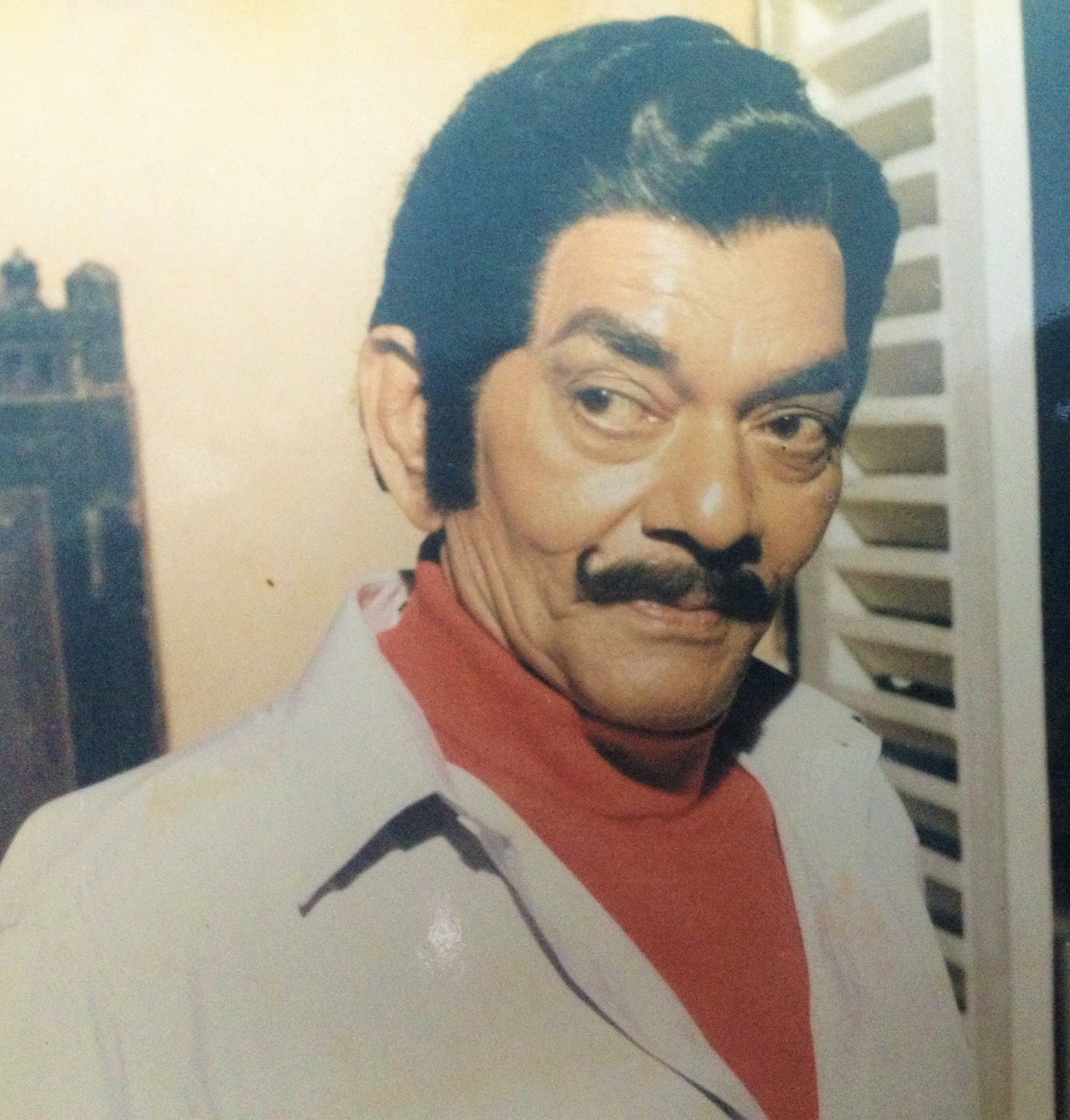
- Rajanala in Hello Brother (1994)
- Born: Rajanala Kaleswara Rao; 3 January 1925; Nellore, Andhra Pradesh, India
- Died: 21 May 1998 (aged 73); Chennai, Tamil Nadu, India
- Other names: Rajanala; Kalayya; King of Villains
- Education: University of Lucknow; Andhra University
- Occupations: Actor; Thespian
- Years active: 1950–1996
- Known for: Gundamma Katha; Dakshayagnam; Chitti Tammudu; Gulebakavali Katha; Shri Krishna Pandaviyam; Palnati Yudham
- Spouse: R. B. Devi
- Awards: Andhra Pradesh State Nandi Awards

Rajanala Kaleswara Rao, known mononymously by his surname as Rajanala, was an Indian actor known for his works predominantly in Telugu cinema, Telugu theatre, and a few Tamil, Kannada, and Hindi films. In a film career spanning more than four decades, Rajanala acted in more than 1400 feature films in a variety of characters. Regarded as one of the finest method actors, Rajanala was known for his gruesome portrayals of lead antagonist roles during the Golden age of Telugu cinema. The Government of Andhra Pradesh and the film industry felicitated him for his achievements and contribution to Indian film industry. He won several Filmfare Awards South and Nandi Award.

== Early life and characteristics ==
Rajanala was born on January 3, 1925, in Nellore, Andhra Pradesh, India. While working as a revenue inspector in Nellore from 1944 to 1951, he started working in theatre. He had a post graduate in philosophy from University of Lucknow and was a voracious reader of English literature. Before coming to Cinema, he won several awards and accolades for his acting in Theatre. He was a noted villain against N.T.Rama Rao, a versatile actor of Telugu filmdom at that time. Rajanala had well proportioned body, he also won MR. Madras for his Physique. Rajanala iconic acting was mostly through the movement of his eyes, he evince the cruelty by widening his eyes to various levels and his maniacal laughter was very famous. Rajanala played many villainous roles, but in real life he was an intellectual and spiritual man. Rajanala Kaleswara Rao, the first actor to star alongside three chief ministers, i.e. NT Rama Rao, M. G. Ramachandran and J Jayalalithaa, he also had good friends in other film industry Kollywood and Bollywood.

== Death ==
Being a diabetic, his right leg could not withstand the rigours of outdoor shooting in Araku valley in 1995 when he was playing a full-fledged role in Telugu Veera Levara. His leg which was injured during the shooting had to be amputated at Nizams Institute of Medical Sciences. Later Rajanala shifted to Chennai taken cared by his daughter and son-in-law who was a businessman. Rajanala had severe cardiac arrest and was admitted in Vijaya Hospital in Chennai. He died on 21 May 1998 in Chennai, aged 73.

== Filmography ==
- Pratigya (1953)
- Vaddante Dabbu (1954)
- Jayasimha (1955) as Mahaveerudu
- Suvarna Sundari (1957)
- Dongallo Dora (1957)
- Kutumba Gowravam (1957)
- Vinayaka Chaviti (1957)
- Vaddante Pelli (1957) as Raghunath
- Sati Anasuya (1957)
- Raja Nandini (1958) as Tirumala Nayak
- Sri Krishna Maya (1958) as Indra
- Sri Ramanjaneya Yuddham (1958) as Anjaneya
- Karthavarayuni Katha (1958)
- Dongalunnaru Jagratha (1958)
- Manchi Manasuku Manchi Rojulu (1958)
- Pelli Sandadi (1959)
- Raja Malaya Simha (1959)
- Raja Makutam (1959)
- Mahishasura Mardini (1959) (Kannada)
- Banda Ramudu (1959)
- Rechukka Pagatichukka (1959)
- Vachina Kodalu Nachindi (1959)
- Sri Venkateswara Mahatyam (1960)
- Runanubandham (1960) as Veerabhadram
- Anna Chellelu (1960) as Aggi Pidugu Jaggadu
- Sahasra Siracheda Apoorva Chinthamani (1960) as Mathivadana Maharaju
- Vimala (1960) as Ugrasimha
- Aasha Sundari (1960) (Kannada) as Kapalabhairava
- Kanaka Durga Pooja Mahima (1960) as Meghanathudu
- Pillalu Thechina Challani Rajyam (1960) as Mahasena
- Usha Parinayam (1961)
- Nagarjuna (1961) (Kannada) as Anjaneya
- Jagadeka Veeruni Katha (1961) as Threesokanandudu
- Taxi Ramudu (1961) as Nagu
- Khaidi Kannaiah (1962)
- Siri Sampadalu (1962) as Bhujangam
- Gulebakavali Katha (1962) as Vakraketu
- Gaali Medalu (1962)
- Chitti Tammudu (1962)
- Dakshayagnam (1962) as Indra
- Gundamma Katha (1962)
- Swarna Manjari (1962) as Rajaguru Mahendra Shakthi
- Madana Kamaraju Katha (1962) as Bhoothapathi
- Paruvu Prathishta (1963) as Narendra
- Bandipotu (1963) as Soorasimha
- Valmiki (1963) (Kannada)
- Valmiki (1963)
- Guruvunu Minchina Sishyudu (1963) as Keertisena
- Ramudu Bheemudu (1964) as Panakala Rao
- Vaarasatwam (1964) as Narasimham
- Devatha (1964)
- Sabhash Suri (1964) as Seshu
- Thotalo Pilla Kotalo Rani (1964) as Durjaya
- Desa Drohulu (1964)
- Aggi Pidugu (1964) as Veerendrudu
- Bobbili Yudham (1964) as Vijayaramaraju
- Pratigna Palana (1965) as Arindhava
- Pandava Vanavasam (1965) as Saindhava
- Mangamma Sapadham (1965)
- Aakasaramanna (1965) as Narasinga Rayulu
- C.I.D. (1965)
- Sri Simhachala Kshetra Mahima (1965) as Indra
- Vijaya Simha (1965) as Prathap
- Dorikithe Dongalu (1965) as Sudarsanam
- Satya Harishchandra (1965)
- Jwala Dweepa Rahasyam (1965) as Bhallataka Varma
- Veerabhimanyu (1965) as Duryodhana
- Aada Brathuku (1965)
- Sri Krishna Pandaviyam (1966)
- Pidugu Ramudu (1966) as Gajendra Varma
- Palnati Yudham (1966)
- Goodachari 116 (1966)
- Sri Krishna Tulabharam (1966) as Indra
- Aame Evaru? (1966)
- Gopaludu Bhoopaludu (1967) as Veerabahu
- Kanchu Kota (1967)
- Devuni Gelichina Manavudu (1967) as Mahabaludu
- Bhama Vijayam (1967) as Kalinga Bhupati Kamavardhanudu
- Nindu Manasulu (1967) as Seshu
- Sri Sri Sri Maryada Ramanna (1967)
- Sri Krishnavataram (1967) as Sisupala
- Ave Kallu (1967) as Rajasekhar
- Farz (1967) (Hindi)
- Apoorva Piravaigal (1967) (Tamil)
- Rahasyam (1967) as Virupaksha
- Niluvu Dopidi (1968)
- Ranabheri (1968) as Ranamallu
- Aggi Meeda Guggilam (1968)
- Bandhavyalu (1968) as Panakala Swamy
- Tikka Sankaraiah (1968) as Sodabuddi Subbayya
- Nene Monaganni (1968) as Bhadrayya
- Deva kanya (1968) as Kamapala, Maharaja of Kamarupa
- Baghdad Gajadonga (1968)
- Ramu (1968)
- Bhagya Chakramu (1968)
- Pedarasi Peddamma Katha (1968)
- Devudichina Bharta (1969) as Ghantasura
- Ukku Pidugu (1969) as Jwalabhairava
- Jarigina Katha (1969) as Bhujangam
- Varakatnam (1969)
- Raja Simha (1969) as Udayanamaha Maharaju
- Gandara Gandadu (1969) as Ranjith
- Gandikota Rahasyam (1969) as Pratapa Rudrudu
- Mooga Nomu (1969)
- Bhale Tammudu (1969) as Gun / Ganapathi
- Saptaswaralu (1969)
- Takkari Donga Chakkani Chukka (1969)
- Basti Kiladilu (1970)
- Merupu Veerudu (1970)
- Ananda Nilayam (1971)
- Sri Krishna Vijayamu (1971) as Lord Shiva
- Raitu Bidda (1971) as Pullayya
- Pagabattina Paduchu (1971) as Sekharam
- Sati Anasuya (1971)
- Bhale Papa (1971) as Sankar, leader of a gang of bandits
- Kathiki Kankanam (1971) as Durjaya
- Andam Kosam Pandem (1971) as Sambharudu
- Suputhrudu (1971) as Nagabhushanam
- Mattilo Manikyam (1971) as Bhujanga Rao
- Pavitra Hrudayalu (1971)
- Chinnanati Snehitulu (1971) as Nagabhushanam
- Debbaku tha Dongala Mutha (1971) as Phool Shah
- Sri Krishnanjaneya Yuddham (1972) as Anjaneya
- Attanu Diddina Kodalu (1972) as Jagapati
- Sri Krishna Satya (1972) as Satrajit
- Inspector Bharya (1972) as Nagabhushanam
- Oka Nari Vanda Thupakulu (1973) as Bhujangam
- Desoddharakulu (1973) as Tata Rao
- Doctor Babu (1973) as Pothuraju
- Jeevana Tarangalu (1973) as Pundarikakshaiah
- Alluri Seetarama Raju (1974) as Major Goodall
- Nippulanti Manishi (1974) as Narendra Varma
- Galipatalu (1974)
- Mallela Manasulu (1975) as Kodandam/Balaji
- Kotha Kapuram (1975) as Shavukaru Sagaraiah
- Annadammula Anubandham (1975) as Jailor
- Yashoda Krishna (1975) as Indra
- Andharu Bagundali (1976) as Businessman soliciting company
- Magaadu (1976)
- Maa Daivam (1976)
- Kotalo Paga (1976) as Veerabhadra Bhupathi
- Aradhana (1976)
- Muthyala Pallaki (1976) as Meesala Rosi Reddy
- Daana Veera Soora Karna (1977) as Drona
- Chanakya Chandragupta (1977)
- Agent Gopi (1978) as Boss No. 1
- Yuga Purushudu (1978) as Benerjee
- Mugguru Muggure (1978)
- Dudu Basavanna (1978) as Bangaraiah
- Lawyer Viswanath (1978)
- Rajaputra Rahasyam (1978)
- Pottelu Punnamma (1978) as Judge
- Dongala Veta (1978) as Balwantha Rao
- Nindu Manishi (1978) as Public Prosecutor
- Devadasu Malli Puttadu (1978) as Raja Ranga Raju
- Dongalaku Saval (1979) as Major Chandrasekhar
- Seethe Ramudaithe (1979) as Bhairavaiah
- Evadabba Sommu (1979) as Nalla Trachu Nagu
- Gandharva Kanya (1979) as Vikrama Varma
- Maa Voori Devatha (1979) as Madhavaiah
- Sri Madvirata Parvam (1979) as Drona
- Nakili Manishi (1980)
- Sivamethina Satyam (1980) as Singh
- Kiladi Krishnudu (1980) as Manager
- Mama Allulla Saval (1980) as Judge
- Srirasthu Subhamasthu (1981)
- Patalam Pandu (1981) as Chellayya
- Pagabattina Simham (1982) as Ramapuram Zamindar
- Bobbili Puli (1982)
- Nijam Chepithe Nerama (1983) as Govt. Official
- Chattaniki Veyyi Kallu (1983) Rangaiah, Commissioner of Police
- Bhale Thammudu (1985)
- Surya Chandra (1985)
- Punnami Ratri (1985) as Zamindar
- Vishakanya (1985) as Maharaju
- Kashmora (1986) as Vishachi
- Magadheerudu (1986)
- Number One (1994)
- Hello Brother (1994) as Rajanala
- Jailor Gaari Abbayi (1994)
- Telugu Veera Levara (1995) as Goodall
- Puttinti Gowravam (1996) as Party Leader

== Gallery ==
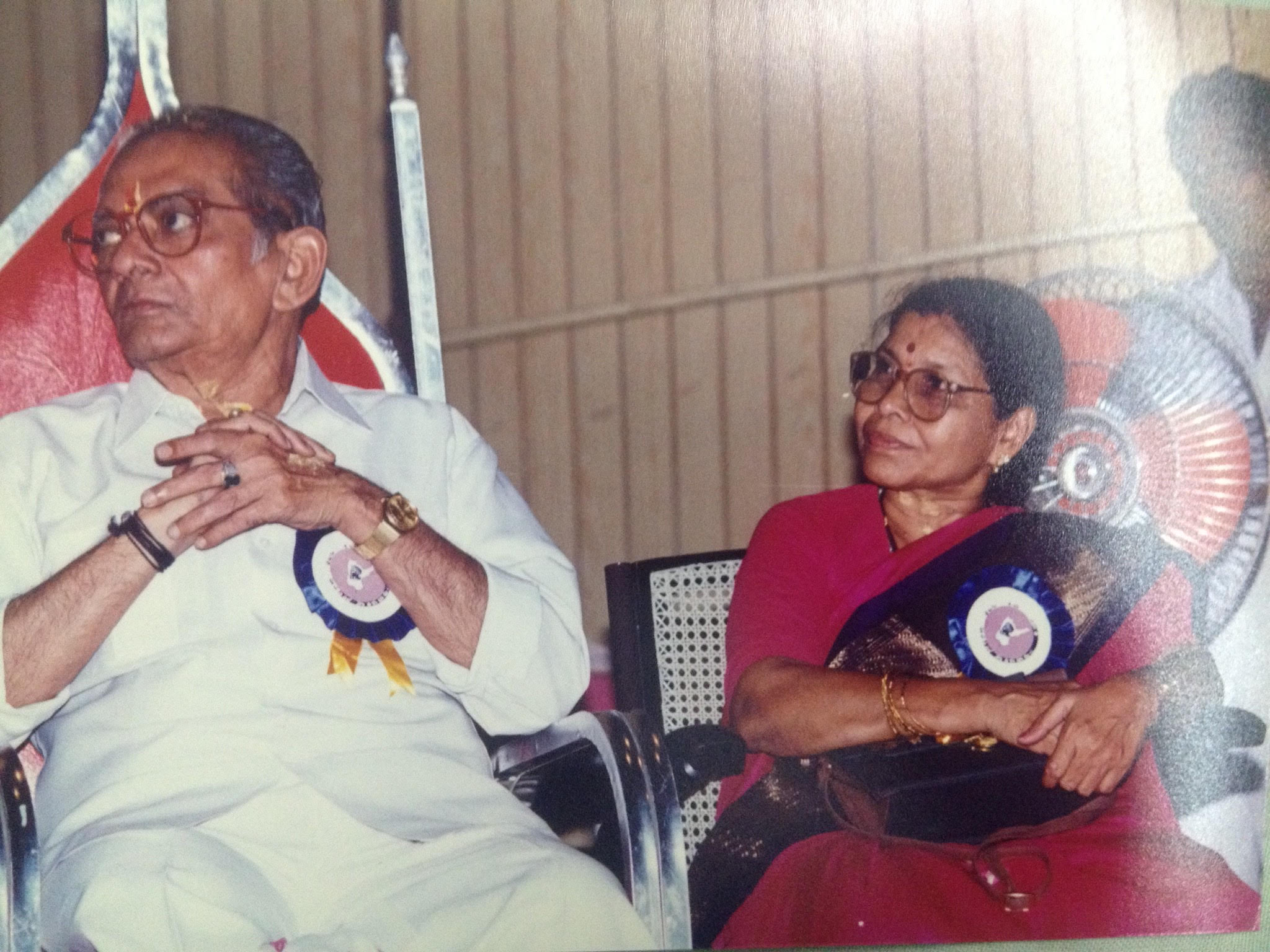
Rajanala with wife

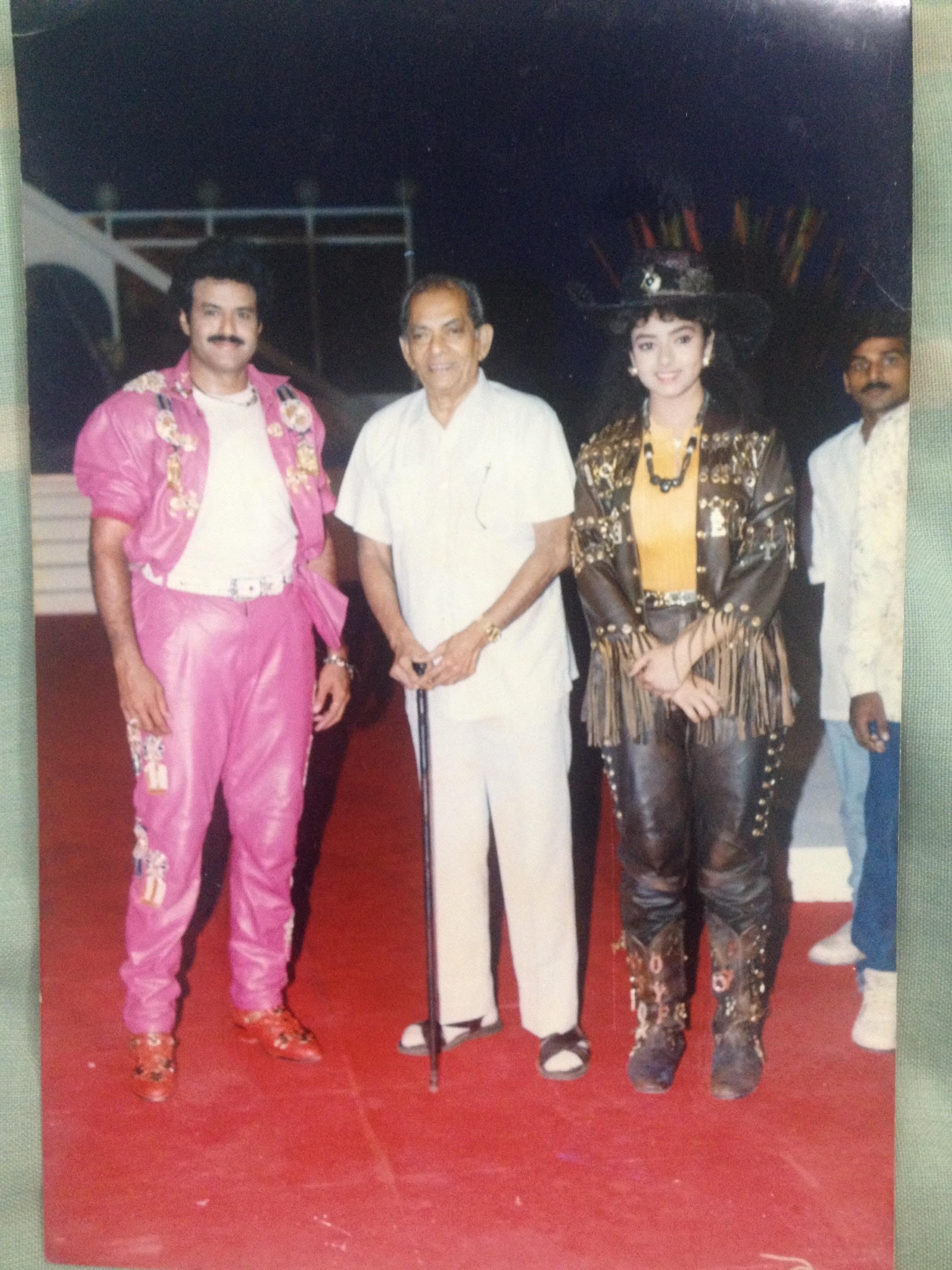
Rajanala with Nandamuri Balakrishna and Soundarya

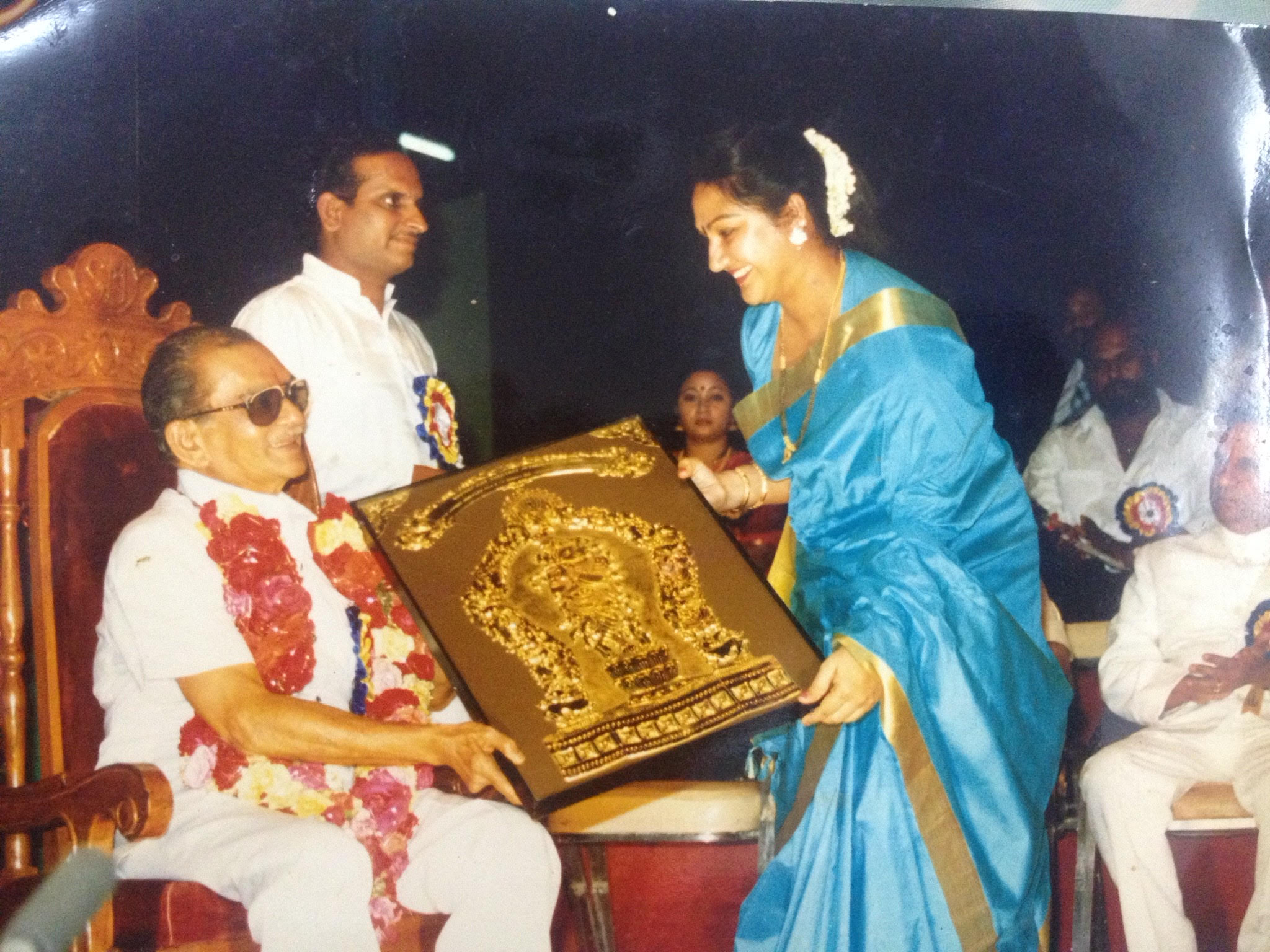
Actress Manjula felicitate Rajanala at Vamsee Berkely Awards

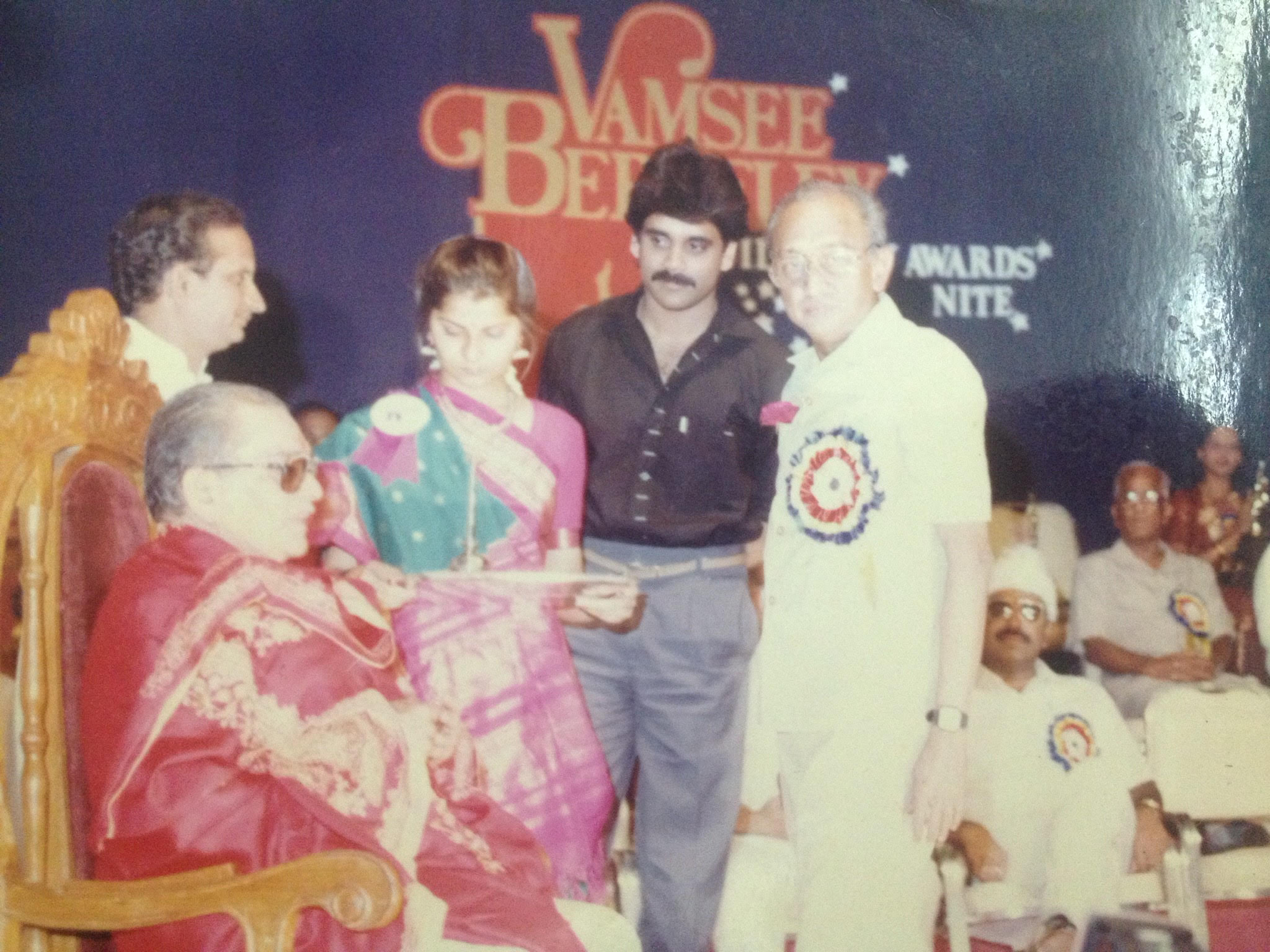
Rajanala and Akkineni Nagarjuna at Vamsee Berkely awards

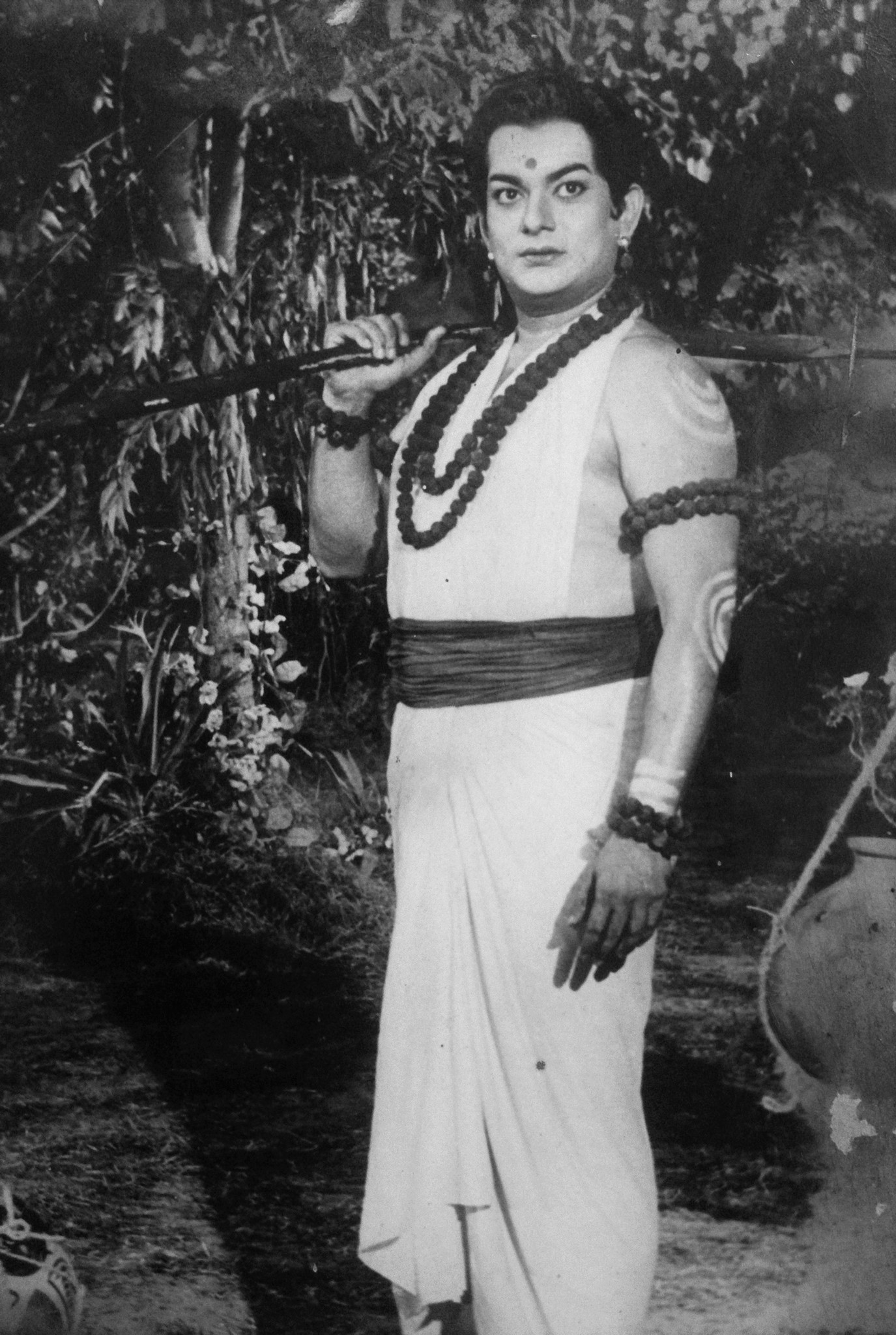
Rajanala or 'Kallayya

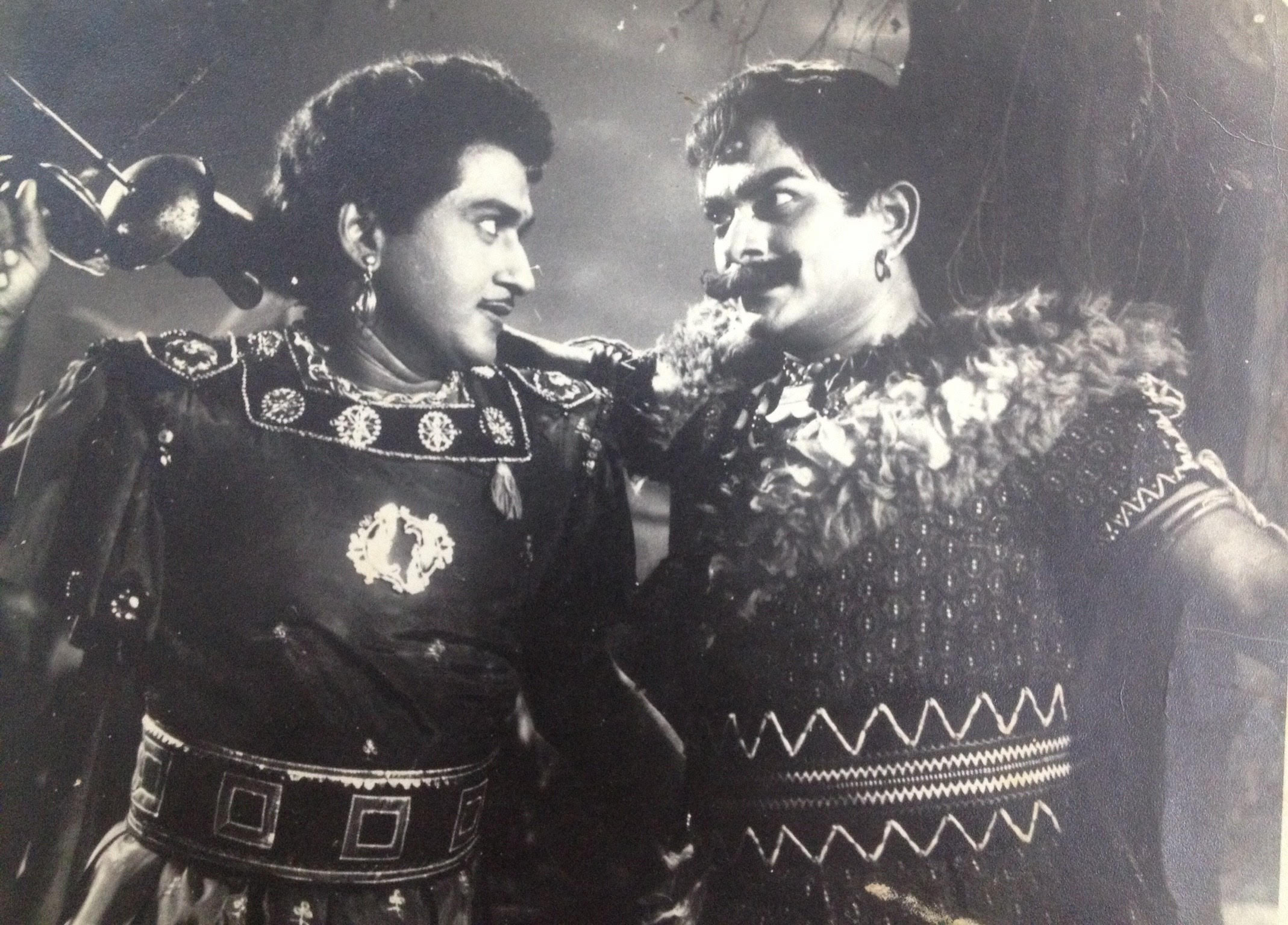
Rajanala and actor Balayya

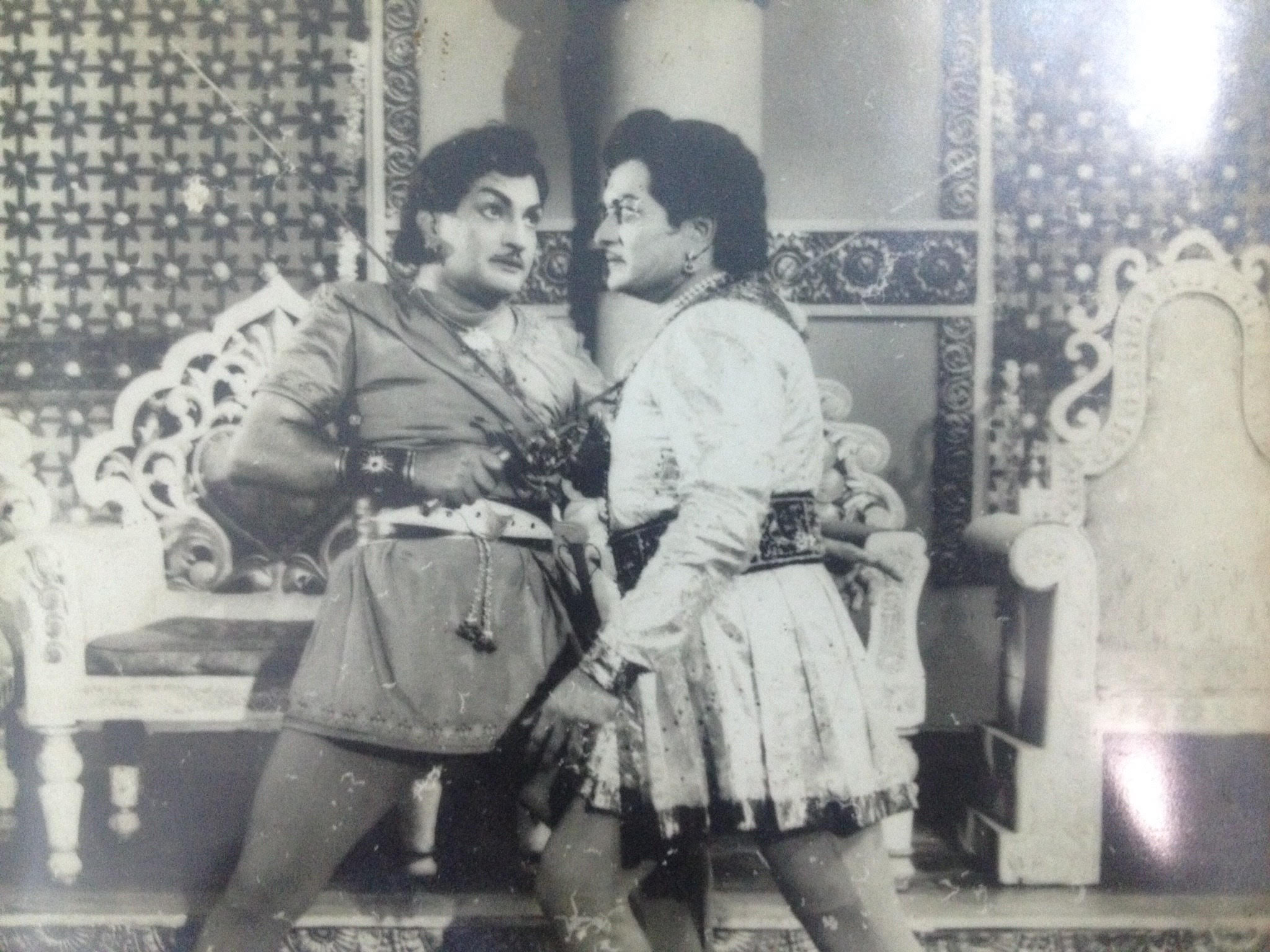
Rajanala and N.T Rama Rao

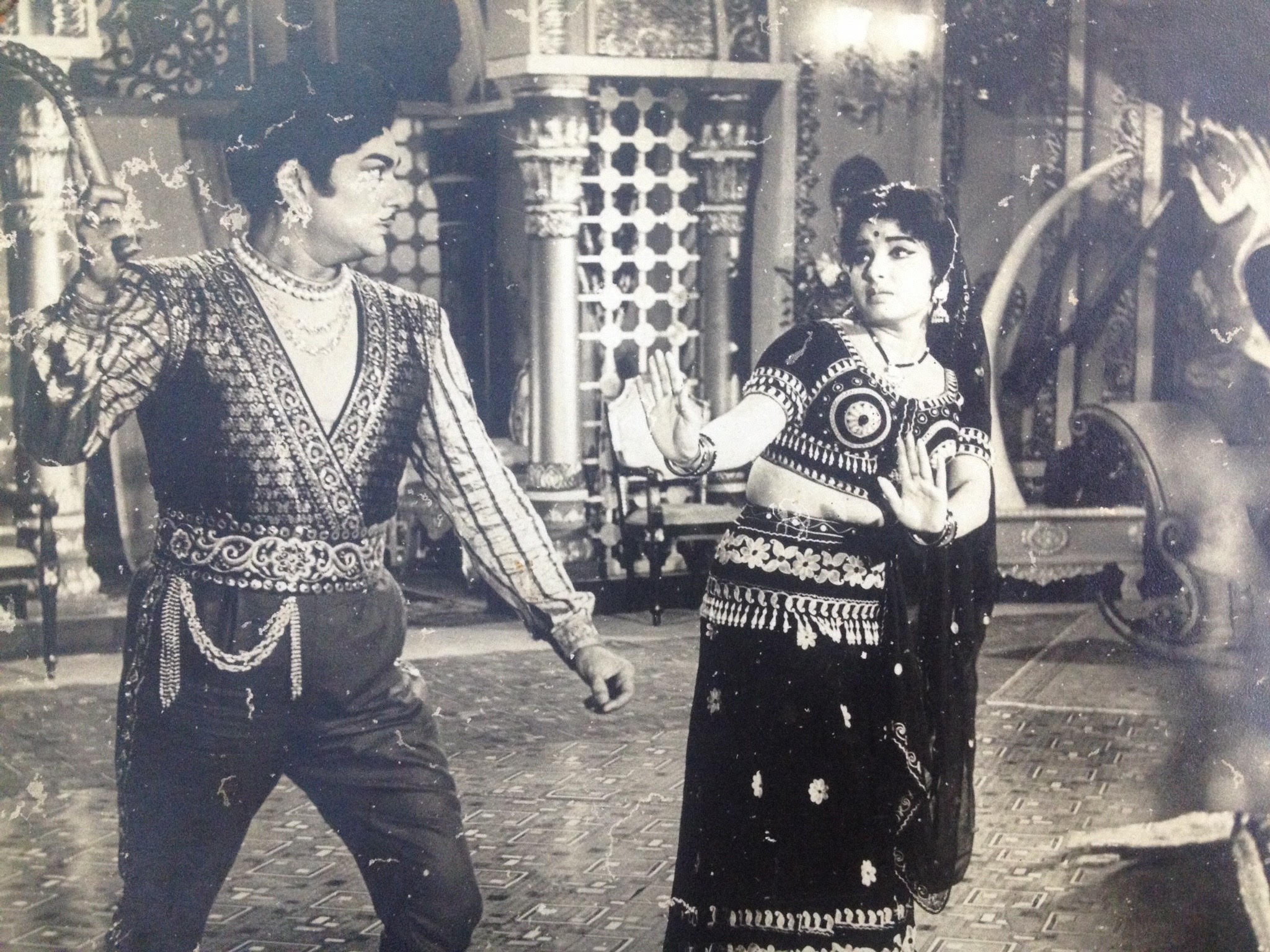
Rajanala and Jayalalitha

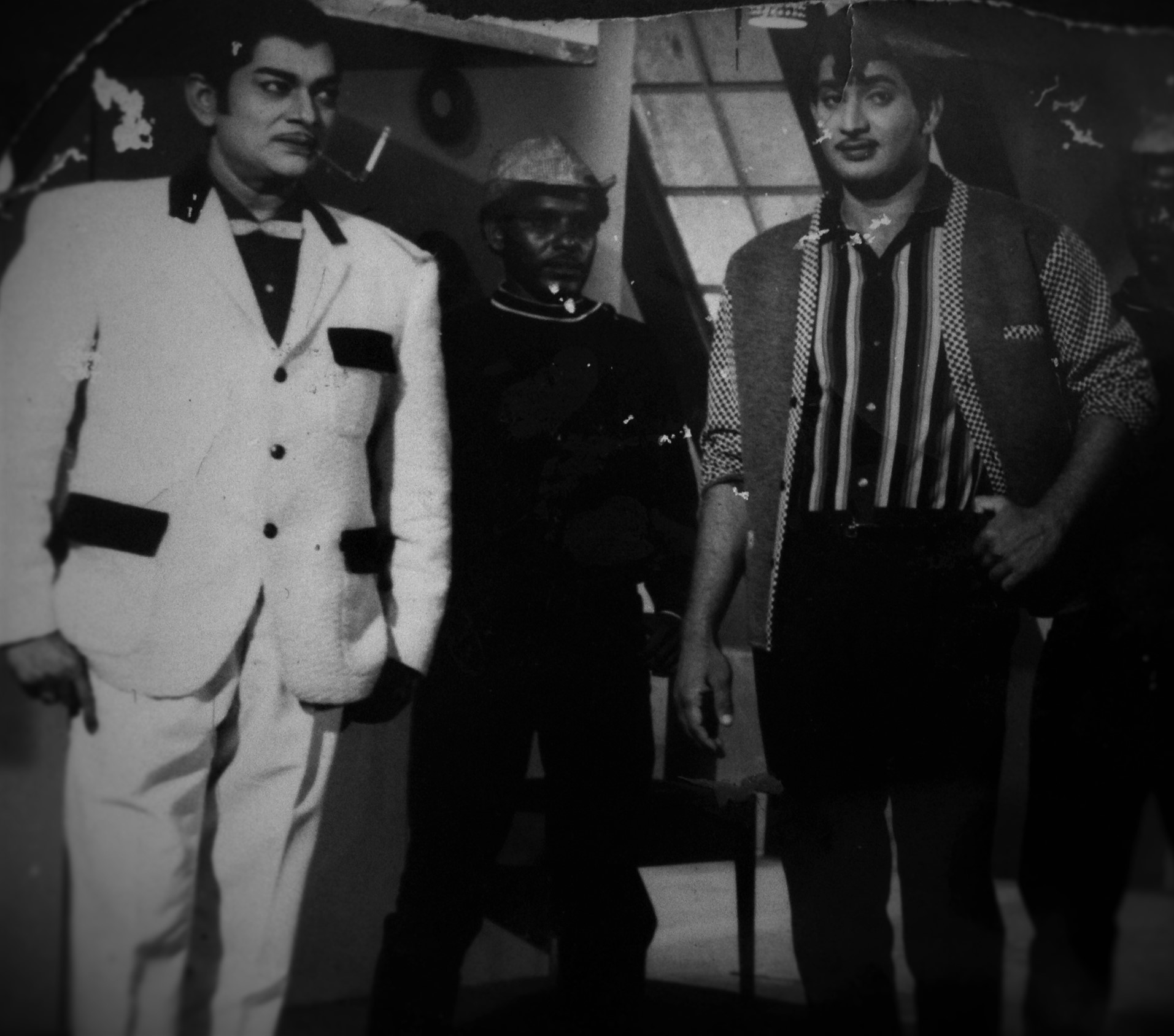
Rajanala and Krishna

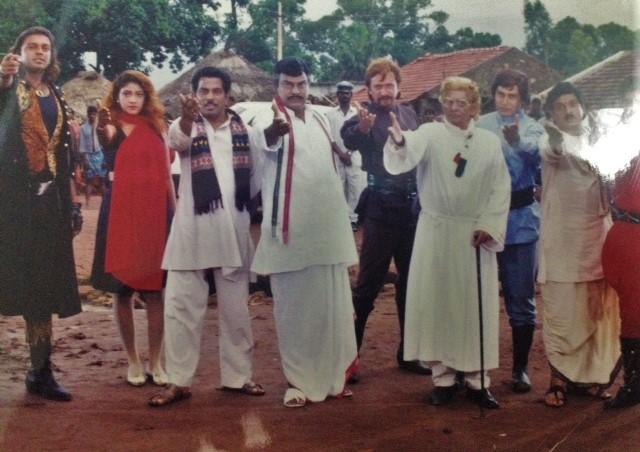
Rajanala Guest appearance

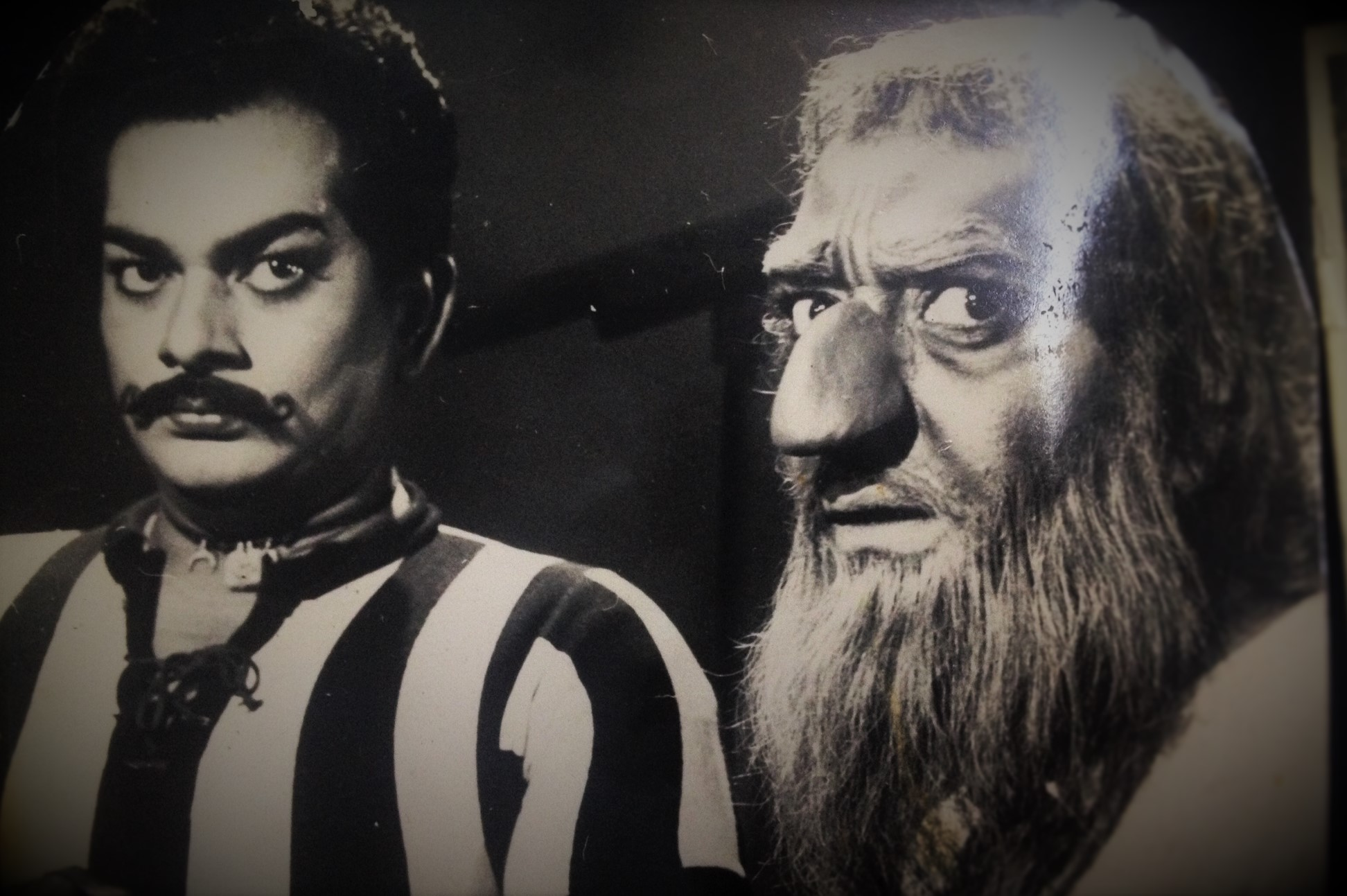

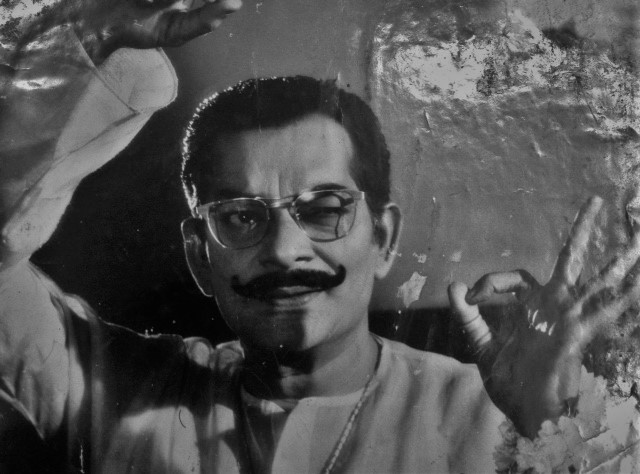

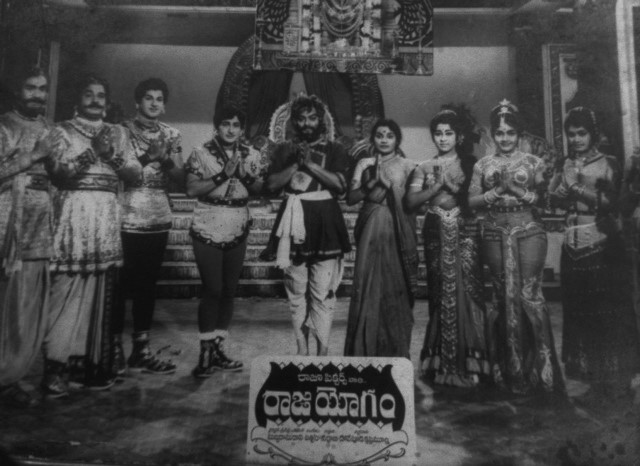
