= Lawyer Viswanath =

- Theatrical release poster
- Directed by: S. D. Lal
- Written by: Gollapudi(dialogues)
- Screenplay by: Ramkhelkar
- Story by: Muktha Gai
- Based on: Vishwanath (1978)
- Produced by: Y. V. Rao
- Starring: N. T. Rama Rao; Jayasudha
- Cinematography: P. Devraj
- Edited by: D. Raja Gopal Rao
- Music by: Satyam
- Production company: Ravi Chitra Films
- Release date: 17 November 1978
- Running time: 157 minutes
- Country: India
- Language: Telugu

Lawyer Viswanath is a 1978 Indian Telugu-language action film produced by Y. V. Rao and directed by S. D. Lal. The film stars N. T. Rama Rao and Jayasudha, with music composed by Satyam. It is a remake of the Hindi film Vishwanath (1978). The film underperformed commercially.

== Cast ==
- N. T. Rama Rao as Lawyer Vishwanath
- Jayasudha as Geeta
- Satyanarayana as Kacheri Kondaiah
- Prabhakar Reddy G.N.K
- Allu Ramalingaiah as Pakshiraju Seetaramaiah / Pakshi
- Kanta Rao as Kamalakar
- Dhulipala as Judge
- Rajanala as Lawyer D. P. Rao
- Mukkamala as Raghavaiah
- Ramana Murthy as Lawyer Varma
- Ranganath as Bhaskar
- Sarath Babu as Prabhu
- Tyagaraju
- Sri Lanka Manohar as Shakka
- Sakshi Ranga Rao as Johny Jalaiah
- Ram Mohan as Eye Doctor
- Mada as Bira the Hypnotizer
- K.V.Chalam as Varahala Shetty
- Balakrishna as Kondaiah henchmen
- Potti Prasad as Jail Warden
- K. K. Sarma as Prisoner
- Pandari Bai as Shanthamma
- Kavitha as Gowri
- Tiger Prabhakar as Soda Jaggu
- Pushpa Kumari

== Soundtrack ==
Music composed by Satyam.

Track listing
No.	Title	Lyrics	Singer(s)	Length
1.	"Piliche Piliche"	C. Narayana Reddy	P. Susheela	4:30
2.	"Sharaabee"	Aarudhra	S. Janaki, Madhavapeddi Ramesh	3:41
3.	"Raamudeppudoo"	C. Narayana Reddy	S. P. Balasubrahmanyam	3:59
4.	"Kalakaalam"	Veturi	S. P. Balasubrahmanyam, P. Susheela	3:52
5.	"Bham Bham Bham"	Veturi	S. P. Balasubrahmanyam, P. Susheela	5:30

== Reception ==
Venkatrao of Andhra Patrika, in his review dated 23 November 1978, appreciated Rama Rao's performance and production values. He added that Lal's adaptation stands up to the original.
