= Rajaputra Rahasyam =

- Movie Poster
- Directed by: S. D. Lal
- Written by: Gollapudi(dialogues)
- Produced by: Yarlagadda Lakshmaiah Chowdary; C. S. Rao
- Starring: N. T. Rama Rao; Jaya Prada
- Cinematography: A. Vincent
- Edited by: Kotagiri Gopala Rao; Kotagiri Venkateswara Rao
- Music by: K. V. Mahadevan
- Production company: Jayalakshmi Movies
- Release date: 28 July 1978
- Running time: 126 mins
- Country: India
- Language: Telugu

Rajaputra Rahasyam (transl. Secret of the King's Son) is 1978 Indian Telugu-language swashbuckler film, produced by Yarlagadda Lakshmaiah Chowdary and C. S. Rao under the Jayalakshmi Movies banner and directed by S. D. Lal. It stars N. T. Rama Rao, Jaya Prada and music composed by K. V. Mahadevan.

== Cast ==
- N. T. Rama Rao as Gajendra
- Jaya Prada as Priyadarshini
- Satyanarayana as Sanyasi Mantra Sidda
- M. Balaiah as Chandrashekara Maharaju
- Mohan Babu as Nandi Keshava
- Allu Ramalingaiah as Sarangudu
- Mikkilineni as Rushi
- Dhulipala as Kuha Gandharvudu
- Rajanala as Chaludu
- Malladi as Avanti Maharaju
- Chalapathi Rao as Malla
- Jagga Rao as Thief
- Jamuna as Tripura Sundari Devi
- Kanchana as Ratnangi Devi
- Pushpalata as Parvathi
- Jayamalini as Apsarasa
- Halam as Apsarasa
- Padma Khanna as item number

== Soundtrack ==
Rajaputra Rahasyam

Film score by K. V. Mahadevan
- Released: 1978
- Genre: Soundtrack
- Length: 19:02
- Label: EMI Columbia
- Producer: K. V. Mahadevan

K. V. Mahadevan chronology
| Yuga Purushudu (1978) | Rajaputra Rahasyam (1978) | KD No:1 (1978) |

Music composed by K. V. Mahadevan. Music released by EMI Columbia Audio Company.

| S. No | Song title | Lyrics | Singers | length |
|---|---|---|---|---|
| 1 | "Siri Malle Puvvu Meedha" | Veturi | S. P. Balasubrahmanyam, P. Susheela | 4:27 |
| 2 | "Sannallakochchadu" | Veturi | S. Janaki | 3:45 |
| 3 | "Entha Sarasudu" | C. Narayana Reddy | S. P. Balasubrahmanyam, P. Susheela | 3:24 |
| 4 | "Opaleni Theepi" | C. Narayana Reddy | P. Susheela | 3:57 |
| 5 | "Dikkulenni Dhaataado" | Veturi | P. Susheela, S. Janaki | 3:29 |
