= Kommineni =

Kommineni (Telugu: కొమ్మినేని) is a Telugu surname. Notable people with the surname include:

- Kommineni Apparao, better known as Chakravarthy, Telugu film music director.
- Kommineni Seshagiri Rao, famous Telugu film director.
- Sri Kommineni born as Kommineni Srinivasa Chakravarthi was an Indian film composer.
