= Tripuraneni Maharadhi =

Indian screenwriter (1930–2011)

- Born: 20 April 1930; Pasmarru, Andhra Pradesh, India
- Died: 23 December 2011 (aged 81); Hyderabad
- Occupations: Film script and dialogue writer, film producer and political analyst
- Known for: Alluri Seetharama Raju, Telugu Desam Party pioneer

Tripuraneni Maharadhi (20 April 1930 – 23 December 2011) was an Indian screenwriter known for his works in Telugu cinema. He is remembered for his political forays, as well as for the film Alluri Seetharama Raju. His son, Tripuraneni Varaprasad is a filmmaker and a prominent BJP politician.

== Role in politics ==
Maharadhi is to some degree, linked to every political party in the Telugu political frame and was instrumental in the launch of the Telugu Desam Party (TDP). He was the first person to come up with the idea of a regional party in Andhra Pradesh after which he started a campaign namely Telugu Tejam as prospective title for a regional party. The manifesto consisted of a 16-point agenda, which included the famous phrase "Telugu Valla Atma Gauravam", which N. T. Rama Rao (NTR) used to a great extent to promote TDP's political vision. Maharadhi vehemently proposed Telugu tejam to fill the then existing political vacuum and also to establish a political identity for Telugu people (ref : Marosari maranisthunna NTR and NTR punarudhaanam); later a few intellectuals joined this crusade and soon it attracted many visionaries into this movement. Maharadhi, along with the few intellectuals, decided that a sammohan shakti is required to counter the charisma of Indira Gandhi and the Indian National Congress, hence, Rama Rao was finally convinced to join the initiative, wherein he took over the reins and finally Telugu Tejam was named as Telugu Desam to fight the next electoral battle.

Maharadhi also served as Andhra Pradesh Congress Secretary when Y. S. Rajasekhara Reddy (YSR) was Andhra Pradesh Congress president. In this position, he was instrumental in promoting YSR in the East and West Godavari districts in YSR's early days. When the Bharatiya Janata Party (BJP) came into existence, he briefly served as a National Council member. In 2004, Maharadhi launched his own political party 'Trilinga Praja Pragathi' (TPP) with the slogan 'Badugu vargala rajyadhikaram' (power to the weaker sections of the society).

== Works ==
=== Filmography and written works ===
- Sathi Arundhati
- Kanchukota
- Yodhanu Yodhulu (1961)
- Ranabheri*
- Niluvu Dhopidi
- Pethandhaarl
- Simhasanam
- Devudu Chesina Manushulu
- Bandipotu
- Kanchukota
- Niluvu Dopidi
- Pettandarlu
- Desoddharakulu
- Devudu Chesina Manushulu
- Paadi Pantalu
- Kurukshetram
- Ram Robert Raheem
- Hema Hemeelu
- Praja Rajyam
- Simhasanam
- Santhi Sandesam

Plus 150 scripts to his credit.

=== As producer ===
- Desamante manushuloye (1971)
- Bogimantalu (1982)
- Raithu Bharatam (1994)
- Vandikaara Magan*
- Manchini penchaali*
