= Kommuri Sambasiva Rao =

- కొమ్మూరి సాంబశివరావు
- Born: 26 October 1926; Tenali, Guntur district, Madras State
- Died: 17 May 1994; Chennai, Tamil Nadu
- Occupations: Journalist, Novelist
- Years active: 1956–1994
- Parents: Venkatramaiah (father); Padmavathi (mother)

Kommuri Sambasiva Rao (1926–1994) was a Telugu novelist and a journalist. He was born into a family of writers. He wrote over 90 novels in Telugu, including the first horror novel in the language. He is best known for his detective novels.

== Life ==
He was born on 26 October 1926 in Tenali, Guntur district, Madras State to Venkatramaiah, Padmavathi. Venkatramaiah used to own a printing press in Tenali. He is the younger brother of famous Telugu writer Chalam. Because Chalam was adopted by his grand father his surname got changed to Gudipati. His mother Padmavathi used to play stage dramas along with Bellary Raghava. Sambasiva Rao's elder sister Varudhini is a wife of Kodavatiganti Kutumba Rao, another famous writer. His younger sister Usha Rani was the chairman of Telugu division of National Book Trust, New Delhi.

He wrote short stories at the age of 14 years. He extensively wrote between 1957–1980. He was inspired the English writer Edgar Wallace. Indian ex-prime minister P. V. Narasimha Rao used to like his writings. Popular Telugu writer Malladi Venkata Krishna Murthy is also inspired by his writings.

== Writings ==
He wrote first spy thriller called No.888 in Telugu. The first horror novel in Telugu Chavu Tappite Chalu was also written by him. He worked as a journalist for a magazine called Telugu Cinema. Later he ran a literatary journal called Manjusha. He is best known for his detective novels. He wrote 75 detective novels and close to 20 social novels. Close to 1 million copies of his novels were sold. Prominent character in his novels are Detective Yugandhar, and his assistant Raju, and Inspector Swarajya Rao. Background for most of the novels is Madras. Below is the partial list of novels written by him.

- Lakshadhikari Hatya
- Chavu Keka
- Ardha Rathri Atithi
- Uri Tadu
- Pramila Devi Hatya
- Chikatiki Veyi Kallu
- Adugo Athane Donga
- Mathi Poyina Manishi
- Nenu Chavanu
- Practical Joker
- Pramadam Jagratta
- Nuvvu Evari Kosam
- Oka Vennela Rathri
- Oka Challani Rathri
- Prapanchaniki 10 Gantallo Pramadam
- Locket Marmam
- 24 Gantalalo
- 28 Metlu
- Addadaruunnayi Jagratta
- Adugo Athane Hantakudu
- Adugu Padithe Apayam
- Aiduguru Anumanithulu
- Ardharatri Pilupu
- Atanu Atanu Kadu
- Chavu Tappite Chalu
- Chetulu Ettu
- Errani Gurtu
- Gana Gana Mogina Ganta
- Malli Eppudo Ekkado
- Mundu Nuyyi Venuka Goyyi
- Nannu Champakandi
- Nefalo Captain Naresh
- Nenu Nenu Kanu
- No 222
- No 333
- No 444
- No 555
- No 678
- No 777
- No 888
- No 787
- Padunu Leni Katti Gullu Leni Pistholu
- Papam Pilichindi
- Paripoyina Khaidi
- Sujatha
- Talupu Teriste Chastavu
- Valalo Chikkina Vanitha
- x808
