= M. Prabhakar Reddy =

Indian actor, writer (1935–1997)

- Born: 8 Oct 1935; Thungathurthy, Hyderabad State, India
- Died: 25 November 1997 (aged 62); Hyderabad, Andhra Pradesh, India
- Occupations: Actor; writer
- Years active: 1960–1988

Mandadi Prabhakar Reddy (1935–1997) was an Indian film character actor known for his works in Telugu cinema. He acted in over 472 films over three decades. He wrote stories for several acclaimed films, including Karthika Deepam.

Dr. M. Prabhakar Reddy donated approximately 32 acres of land to provide shelter for homeless workers in the Telugu film industry. His children would turn this land into a residential community name the Dr. M. Prabhakar Reddy Chitrapuri Colony, preserving his memory and his commitment to the well-being of film workers.

== Early life ==
He was born in Thungathurthy, Hyderabad State, (present day [Nalgonda] district of [Kethepally Mandal] Telangana) India to Lakshma Reddy and Kausalya.

After primary education in Suryapet town, he did his intermediate course from City College, Hyderabad. He did his medical education from Osmania Medical College under Osmania University, Hyderabad between 1955 and 1960.

== Film career ==
Prabhakar Reddy debuted in the film Chivaraku Migiledi, directed by Gutta Ramineedu, in 1960, in which he acted as a psychiatrist. He acted in about 472 films during the next three decades.

He wrote stories for about 21 Telugu films. Some of them were highly successful. They include Pandanti Kapuram, Pacchani Samsaram, Dharmatmudu, Gruha pravesam, Gandhi Puttina Desam, Karthika Deepam and Naaku Swatantram Vacchindi. He wrote and directed the film Comrade (1996), which featured lyrics by K. G. Satyamurthy and Masterji.

He gave the screen name for famous Telugu actress Jaya Prada, originally Lalitha Rani, and introduced her in a three-minute song in the Telugu film Bhoomi Kosam in 1976.

== Death ==
He died in 1997 in Hyderabad due to cariadic arrest. The Telugu film fraternity attended his funeral.

== Awards ==
Nandi Awards

- Best Actor – Yuvatharam Kadilindi (1980)
- Best Actor – Palle Pilichindi (1981)
- Second Best Story Writer – Gruha Pravesam (1982)
- Best Supporting Actor – Chinna Kodalu (1990)

== Filmography ==
Partial list of M. Prabhakar Reddy film credits
Year	Title	Role
1960	Chivaraku Migiledi	Psychiatrist
1962	Bhishma	Santanu
1962	Mahamantri Timmarusu	Veerabhadra Gajapati
1962	Siri Sampadalu	Doctor
1963	Sri Krishnarjuna Yudham	Lord Shiva
1963	Punarjanma	
1963	Narthanasala	Karna
1964	Bobbili Yudham	
1965	Pandava Vanavasam	Karna
1965	Aakasaramanna	Gopalakrishna Rayulu
1965	Manushulu Mamathalu	Seshu
1966	Sri Krishna Pandaveeyam	Karna
1966	Loguttu Perumallukeruka	Bhaskar Rao
1966	Monagallaku Monagadu	Bhujangam
1966	Navaratri	Police Inspector
1966	Palnati Yudham	Kannama Dasu
1966	Saraswathi Sabatham (Tamil)	Brahma
1967	Sri Krishnavataram	Balarama
1967	Kanchu Kota	
1967	Ummadi Kutumbam	
1967	Nindu Manasulu	
1968	Bandipotu Dongalu	Police officer
1968	Brahmachari	
1968	Veeranjaneya	Vayu Deva
1968	Aggi Meeda Guggilam	Kamabhupaludu
1968	Vintha Kapuram	Raju
1968	Adrushtavanthulu	Raju
1969	Sri Rama Katha	Dhumrakshudu
1969	Gandikota Rahasyam	Dalapathi
1969	Aatmiyulu	
1969	Ukku Pidugu	Bhujanga, Invader of Kalinga
1969	Sipayi Chinnayya	Kodandam
1969	Bhale Thammudu	Inspector Sekhar
1969	Jarigina Katha	Suspicious Husband
1969	Natakala Rayudu	Prem Kumar
1970	Himmat (Hindi)	
1970	Akka Chellelu	Senior lawyer
1970	Jagath Jetteelu	Johnny Jinger
1970	Pettandarulu	
1970	Lakshmi Kataksham	King Mahendra Varma
1971	Mattilo Manikyam	Raghavaiah
1971	Anuradha	Ranganatham
1971	Jagath Janthrilu	Gangaram
1971	Vintha Samsaram	Ashok
1971	Basthi Bul Bul	Raoji
1971	Mosagallaku Mosagadu	
1971	Jeevitha Chakram	
1971	Ramalayam	Rayudu
1972	Sri Krishna Satya	Ashwatthama
1972	Pandanti Kapuram	
1972	Kiladi Bullodu	
1972	Korada Rani	Khaidi No. 333 aka Gorakhnath
1972	Nijam Nirupistha	Raju, leader of the bandits gang
1972	Papam Pasivadu	
1972	Pilla? Piduga?	Reeku
1973	Oka Nari Vandha Thupakulu	Beaton Dora
1973	Manchi Vallaki Manchivadu	Jaggu
1973	Samsaram Sagaram	
1973	Desoddharakulu	Commissioner Prabhakar Rao
1974	Alluri Seetharama Raju	
1974	Andaru Dongale	
1974	Mangalya bhagyam	Raghu
1974	Devadasu	
1974	Bhoomi Kosam	Raghavulu
1975	Yeduruleni Manishi	
1975	Annadammula Anubandham	
1975	Gunavanthudu	
1976	Padi Pantalu	Somayya
1976	Iddaru Iddare	Narasimha Raja aka Raja Saheb
1976	Bhakta Kannappa	
1976	Bhale Dongalu	
1976	Aradhana	
1976	Bangaru Manishi	Bhanoji Rao
1977	Daana Veera Soora Karna	Dharmaraja
1977	Chanakya Chandragupta	
1977	Yamagola	Ramana Murthy/Rama Sastry
1977	Gadusu Pillodu	Papa Rao
1977	Amara Deepam	Ranganatham
1978	Indradhanussu	'Watchman' Chandrayya
1978	Agent Gopi	S.P. Raja Rao
1978	Katakatala Rudraiah	
1978	Lawyer Viswanath	G.N.K.
1978	Chilipi Krishnudu	
1978	Pottelu Punnamma	Dharmaiah
1978	Sahasavanthudu	Mukherjee
1978	Dongala Veta	Mohan Rao
1978	Kondura	Bhairav's servant
1978	Melu Kolupu	Parabrahmam
1979	Seethe Ramudaithe	Pothuraju
1979	Sommokadidi Sokokadidi	Black tiger
1979	Srungara Ramudu	
1979	Sri Madvirata Parvam	Dharma Raja
1979	Gorintaku	
1979	Tiger	
1979	Yugandhar	David/Bhanoji
1979	Karthika Deepam	Story writer and Actor: Dhananjaya Rao)
1979	Maa Voori Devatha	Raghavaiah
1979	Judagadu	Rudrappa
1979	Rangoon Rowdy	Dharma Raju
1979	Sri Rama Bantu	Rahim
1980	Sivamethina Satyam	Bhushan
1980	Bhola Shankarudu	
1980	Mahalakshmi	Madhava
1980	Nakili Manishi	CID Prabhakar
1980	Badai Basavayya	Himself
1980	Kaksha	
1980	Bebbuli	Seshu
1980	Johnny (Tamil)	
1980	Guru	
1980	Sardar Paparayudu	
1980	Buchi Babu	
1980	Venkateswara Vratha Mahatyam	Bhushaiah
1980	Yuvatharam Kadilindi	
1981	Puli Bidda	Robert
1981	Kirayi Rowdylu	
1981	Jagamondi	
1981	Pakkinti Ammayi	
1981	Premabhishekam	
1981	Prema Kanuka	
1981	Srirasthu Subhamasthu	
1982	Bangaru Bhoomi	Harishchandra Rao
1982	Madhura Swapnam	
1982	Gruha Pravesam	
1982	Shamsher Shankar	Venkatapathi
1982	Kalahala Kapuram	Bapatla Suryanarayana aka Basu
1982	Bobbili Puli	
1982	Nivuru Gappina Nippu	
1982	Kaliyuga Ramudu	
1982	Naa Desam	Kailasham
1982	Golconda Abbulu	
1982	Yuvaraju	Ranga Dubba Rao
1982	Pralaya Rudrudu	Deputy Superintendent of Police, Jaya's father
1983	Shakthi	P. K. Bir
1983	Gudachari No.1	Ananda Murthy
1983	Praja Rajyam	Raghavaiah
1983	M. L. A. Yedukondalu	Yella Rao
1983	Police Venkataswamy	
1983	Mayagadu	Acharya aka Black Cobra
1983	Sangharshana	
1983	Moogavani Paga	Parandhamayya
1984	Sardar	Justice Mahendra
1984	Nayakulaku Saval	Jailor Srinivasa Rao
1984	Anubandham	
1984	Bharatamlo Shankaravam	
1984	Padmavyuham	
1984	Kondaveeti Nagulu	Papa Rao
1984	Babulugaadi Debba	
1984	Dandayatra	
1984	Bhale Ramudu	Bhujanga Rao
1984	Merupu Daadi	
1984	Punyam Koddi Purushudu	Punyakoti
1984	Sitaara	Doctor
1984	Tella Gulabeelu	
1984	Sahasame Jeevitham	
1984	Raraju	
1984	Dongalu Baboi Dongalu	Gangulu
1985	Srivaru	Chalapathi
1985	Agni Parvatam	Rudrayya
1985	Illale Devatha	Damodaram
1985	Aggiraju	
1985	Nerasthudu	Ranganna
1985	Khooni	Janardhan
1985	Dongallo Dora	
1985	Nyayam Meere Cheppali	
1985	Chattamtho Poratam	Major Chakrapani
1985	Sri Datta Darsanam	Atri
1986	Nampalli Nagu	Prajapathi
1986	Driver Babu	Keshava Rao
1986	Aranyakanda	
1986	Papikondalu	
1986	Srimathi Kanuka	
1986	Vivaha Bandham	
1986	Jayam Manade	Kondaiah
1986	Dharmapeetam Daddarillindhi	Ranga Rao
1986	Brahma Rudrulu	Marideswara Rao
1986	Adavi Raja	Ranga Rao
1986	Naa Pilupe Prabhanjanam	Koteswara Rao
1987	Viswanatha Nayakudu	Timmarusu
1987	Chaitanya Ratham	Paramahamsa
1987	Ummadi Mogudu	
1987	Pagabattina Panchali	
1987	Lawyer Suhasini	
1987	Mandaladeesudu	Director
1987	Dabbevariki Chedu	
1988	Dorakani Donga	Bharathi's father
1988	Collector Vijaya	
1988	Anna Chellelu	
1988	Antima Theerpu	
1988	Prithviraj	Home Minister
1989	Rajakeeya Chadarangam	Papa Rao
1989	Koduku Diddina Kapuram	
1989	Gandipeta Rahasyam	
1989	Ajatha Satruvu	Durga Prasad
1990	Balachandrudu	
1990	Rao Gari Intlo Rowdy	I.G.
1990	Anna Thammudu	
1990	Chinna Kodalu	
1991	Alludu Diddina Kapuram	Vishwanatham
1991	Pichi Pullaya	
1991	Indra Bhavanam	
1992	Raktha Tharpanam	Constable Ramadas
