= Vanisri filmography =

Filmography

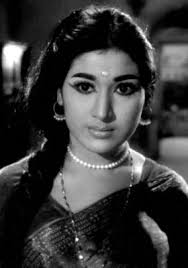

The following is the filmography of Vanisri, the Indian actress who acted in Telugu, Tamil, and Kannada-language films. She acted predominantly in Telugu films. She has appeared in total 200 films among which 147 were in Telugu, 39 in Tamil, 12 in Kannada, and one in Hindi.

== Telugu filmography ==
Year	Title	Role	Notes
1962	Bhishma		
1964	Bangaru Thimmaraju		
1964	Navagraha Pooja Mahima		
1964	Thotalo Pilla Kotalo Rani		
1965	Aakasaramanna	Kamamanjari	
1965	Mangamma Sapatham		
1965	Prameelarjuna Yuddham		
1965	Devatha		
1965	Satya Harishchandra		
1965	Pandava Vanavasam		
1965	Pakkalo Ballem		
1966	Sri Krishna Tulabharam		
1966	Rangula Ratnam		
1966	Paduka Pattabhishekam	Urvashi	Uncredited
1966	Loguttu Perumallakeruka		
1966	Pidugu Ramudu		
1966	Potti Pleader		
1966	Aame Evaru?		
1966	Aastiparulu	Special appearance	
1966	Aggi Barata		
1967	Gopaludu Bhoopaludu		
1967	Ummadi Kutumbam		
1967	Aadapaduchu		
1967	Marapurani Katha		
1967	Stree Janma		
1967	Bhuvana Sundari Katha		
1967	Kanchu Kota		
1967	Devuni Gelichina Manavudu	Rambha	
1967	Nindu Manasulu		
1967	Pedda Akkayya		
1968	Lakshmi Nivasam		
1968	Pantaalu-Pattimpulu		
1968	Sukha Dukhalu		
1968	Ranabheri		
1968	Bharya		
1968	Asadhayudu		
1969	Mahabaludu		
1969	Astulu Anthastulu		
1969	Jagath Kiladeelu		
1969	Nindu Hrudayalu		
1969	Karpura Harathi	Seetha/Radha	Double Role
1969	Aatmeeyulu		
1969	Bhale Rangadu		
1969	Bangaru Panjaram		
1969	Raja Simha	Madhavi	
1970	Chitti Chellelu		
1970	Pachhani Samsaram		
1970	Jagat Jetteelu	Vani	
1970	Kodalu Diddina Kapuram		
1970	Kathanayika Molla		
1970	Pelli Sambandham		
1970	Drohi		
1970	Iddaru Ammayilu		Dual roles. Remake of Kappu Bilupu (Kannada)
1971	Dasara Bullodu		
1971	Atthalu Kodallu	Janaki	
1971	Jeevitha Chakram		
1971	Prem Nagar		
1971	Chinnanati Snehitulu		
1971	Kathaanaayakuraalu		
1971	Chelleli Kapuram		
1971	Jagath Janthrilu	Jhansi	
1971	Debbaku Taa Dongala Muthaa	Bijili	
1971	Mooga Prema		
1971	Raitu Bidda		
1971	Adrusta Jathakudu		
1972	Datta Putrudu		
1972	Koduku Kodalu		
1972	Maa Inti Kodalu		
1972	Sri Krishnanjaneya Yuddham		
1972	Abbaigaru Ammaigaru		
1972	Illu Illalu		
1972	Amma Maata		
1972	Vichitra Bandham		
1972	Marapurani Talli		
1973	Bangaru Babu		
1973	Jeevana Tarangalu		Filmfare Award for Best Actress – Telugu
1973	Desoddharakulu		
1973	Srivaru Maavaru	Vijaya	
1973	Ganga Manga		Double role
1973	Minor Babu		
1973	Vintha Katha		
1973	Manchivadu		
1973	Ramude Devudu		
1974	Khaidi Babai		
1974	Chakravakam		
1974	Krishnaveni		Filmfare Award for Best Actress – Telugu
1974	Manushullo Devudu		
1974	Kannavari Kalalu		Remake of Aradhana
1974	Satyaniki Sankellu		
1975	Jeevana Jyothi	Lakshmi/Shobha	Double role. Filmfare Award for Best Actress – Telugu
1975	Abimanavathi		
1975	Cheekati Velugulu		
1975	Babu		
1975	Pooja		
1975	Eduruleni Manishi		
1975	Ramuni Minchina Ramudu		
1975	Maya Maschindra		
1976	Prema Bandham		
1976	Aradhana		Nominated-Filmfare Award for Best Actress – Telugu
1976	Bhakta Kannappa		
1976	Pogarubotu		
1976	Secretary		
1976	Doralu Dongalu		
1977	Aalu Magalu		
1977	Chakradhari		
1977	Janmajanmala Bandham		
1977	Raja Ramesh		
1977	Edureeta		Nominated-Filmfare Award for Best Actress – Telugu
1977	Jeevana Teeralu		
1978	Chilipi Krishnudu		
1978	Devadasu Malli Puttadu		
1978	Vichitra Jeevitham		
1978	Sri Rama Raksha		
1978	Simha Baludu		
1978	Sahasavanthudu	Radha	
1978	Sati Savitri		
1978	Enki Naidu Baava		
1978	Gorantha Deepam		
1978	Anugraham		Bilingual. Kondura (Hindi version)
1978	Rama Chilaka		
1979	Shri Vinayaka Vijayamu		
1979	Maavari Manchitanam		
1979	Andaman Ammayi		
1979	Sri Madvirata Parvam	Draupadi	
1980	Mahalakshmi	Bhavani	Nominated-Filmfare Award for Best Actress – Telugu
1981	Devudu Mavayaa		
1989	Attaku Yamudu Ammayiki Mogudu		Comeback movie
1989	Swathi Chinukulu		
1989	Agni		
1990	Rao Gari Intlo Rowdy		
1990	Prananiki Pranam	Justice Jayanti Devi	
1990	Bobbili Raja		
1990	Qaidi Dada		
1991	Peddinti Alludu		
1992	Seetharatnam Gari Abbayi		
1992	Atta Sommu Alludu Danam		
1992	Collector Gari Alludu	Kausalya Devi	
1992	Pellam Chatu Mogudu		
1993	Rajeswari Kalyanam		
1993	Evandi Aavida Vachindi		
1993	Allari Alludu		
1993	Rowdy Mogudu	Kamala	
1993	Preme Naa Pranam		
1993	Donga Alludu		
1993	Attaku Koduku Mamaku Alludu		
1994	Hello Alludu		
1995	Amma Naa Kodala		
1996	Bombay Priyudu		
1996	Jabilamma Pelli		
1997	Korukunna Priyudu		
2004	Bhadradri Ramudu		

== Tamil filmography ==
1. Namma Veettu Lakshmi (1966)
2. Kathal Paduthum Padu (1966) as Suguna
3. Thanga Thambi (1967)
4. Bhakta Prahlada (1967)
5. Bhavani (1967)
6. Kadhalithal Podhuma (1967)
7. Thamarai Nenjam (1968)
8. Teacheramma (1968)
9. Kannan En Kadhalan (1968)
10. Nervazhi (1968)
11. Uyarndha Manidhan (1968)
12. Manasatshi (1969)
13. Annaiyum Pithavum (1969)
14. Kuzhandhai Ullam (1969)
15. Kanni Pen (1969)
16. Atthai Magal (1969)
17. Aayiram Poi (1969) as Malathi
18. Nirai Kudam (1969) as Chithra
19. Porchilai (1969)
20. Thabalkaran Thangai (1970)
21. Ethirkalam (1970)
22. Thalaivan (1970)
23. Aathi Parasakthi (1971)
24. Nangu Suvargal (1971)
25. Kulama Gunama (1971)
26. Irulum Oliyum (1971)
27. Velli Vizha (1972)
28. Vasantha Maligai (1972)
29. Avasara Kalyanam (1972)
30. Deiva Kuzhandhaigal (1973)
31. Sivagamiyin Selvan (1974)
32. Vani Rani (1974)
33. Oorukku Uzhaippavan (1976)
34. Rojavin Raja (1976)
35. Thaliya Salangaiya (1977)
36. Ilaya Thalaimurai (1977)
37. Kanchi Kamakshi (1978)
38. Punniya Boomi (1978)
39. Nallathoru Kudumbam (1979)

== Kannada filmography ==
- Veera Sankalpa (1964) - Debut film
- Muriyada Mane (1964)
- Mane Aliya (1964)
- Satya Harishchandra (1965)
- Pathala Mohini (1965)
- Miss Leelavathi (1965)
- Mahasathi Anasuya (1965)
- Chandrahasa (1965)
- Katari Veera (1966)
- Jaanara Jana (1967)
- Kasidre Kailasa (1971)
- Ganda Mane Makkalu (1988)...Saraswathi

== Hindi filmography ==
- Kondura (1978)
