= List of Telugu films of 1973 =

This is a list of Telugu-language films produced in the year 1973.

Title	Director	Cast
Abhimanavantulu		Krishnam Raju, Sharada
Andala Ramudu	Bapu	ANR, Latha, Nagabhushanam, Allu Ramalingaiah
Bangaru Babu	V. B. Rajendra Prasad	ANR, Vanisri
Bangaru Manasulu	K. S. Reddy	Satyanarayana, Jamuna, Chandramohan, Rajasulochana
Bhakta Tukaram	V. Madhusudhana Rao	ANR, Anjali Devi, Sivaji Ganesan, Kanchana
Dabbuki Lokam Dasoham	D. Yoganand	NTR, Jamuna
Desoddharakulu	C. S. Rao	NTR, Vanisri
Devudu Chesina Manushulu	V. Ramachandra Rao	NTR, Krishna
Dhanama? Daivama?	C. S. Rao	NTR, Jamuna
Doctor Babu		Sobhan Babu, Jayalalithaa
Errakota Veerudu	Pardhasaradhi	N. T. Rama Rao, B. Saroja Devi, Savitri, Rajanala
Gandhi Puttina Desam		Krishnam Raju, Prameela
Ganga Manga	V. Rama Chandra Rao	Vanisri, Krishna, Sobhan Babu
Geeta		
Geetaanjali		
Inti Dongalu		Krishnam Raju
Jeevana Tarangalu		Vanisri, Sobhan Babu, Krishnam Raju, Laxmi Chandramohan G
Kanna Koduku	V. Madhusudhana Rao	ANR, Lakshmi
Lokam Marali (Tamil Dub Naangu Suvargal)	K. Balachander	Jaishankar, Ravichandran, Nagesh, Sowcar Janaki, Vanisri, Vijayalalitha, Srividya
Mamatha	P. Chandra Sekhar Reddy	Jamuna, Krishna
Manchi Vallaki Manchivadu	K. S. R. Das	Krishna
Manchivadu	V. Madhusudhana Rao	ANR, Vanisri, Kanchana
Marapurani Manishi	T. Rama Rao	ANR, Manjula Vijayakumar
Mayadari Malligadu	Adurti Subba Rao	Krishna, Manjula, Jayanthi, Nagabhushanam
Meghamala		
Memu Manushulame		Krishnam Raju
Neramu Siksha	K. Viswanath	Krishna, Chandrakala
Oka Nari Vanda Thupakulu	K. V. S. Kutumba Rao	Vijaya Lalitha, Rajanala
Paropakari (Kannada Dub)	Y. R. Swamy	Rajkumar, Jayanthi, Rathna, Sampath, Pandari Bai
Palletoori Bava	K. Pratyagatma	ANR, Lakshmi
Pasi Hrudayalu		Krishna, Jamuna
Poola Mala	Vasanthakumar Reddy	Chandrakala, Krishnam Raju, Nagabhushanam, Relangi, Ramana Reddy, Allu Rama Lingaiah
Puttinillu Mettinillu	Pattu	Krishna, Sobhan Babu, Lakshmi
Samsaram Sagaram	Dasari Narayana Rao	
Sarada		Sobhan Babu, Sharada
Srivaru Maavaru		Krishna
Snehabandam		Jamuna, Krishnam Raju
Sthri Chandra Kala		
Tallikodukulu		
Tata Manavadu	Dasari Narayana Rao	Raja Babu, Vijaya Nirmala
Vaade Veedu	D. Yoganand	NTR, Manjula
Visali		Sharada
