= Venkateswara Rao =

Venkateswara Rao or Venkateshwara Rao is an Indian name. It may refer to:

- Daggubati Venkateswara Rao (born 1959), member of the Indian National Congress
- Ghantasala Venkateswara Rao, South Indian singer and music director
- Gummadi Venkateswara Rao (1927–2010), Telugu film actor
- Inturi Venkateswara Rao, Indian film journalist.
- Kotagiri Venkateswara Rao, Indian film editor
- Mangina Venkateswara Rao, famous agricultural scientist and Vice Chancellor of Acharya N. G. Ranga Agricultural University.
- Narla Venkateswara Rao (1908–1985), journalist
- Narra Venkateswara Rao (died 2009), Telugu actor
- Kadiyala Venkateswara Rao, freelance archaeologist and retired deputy director of Sports, Andhra Pradesh
