= Inturi =

Inturi (Telugu: ఇంటూరి) is a Telugu surname. Notable people with the surname include:

- Inturi Nageswara Rao (born 1977), Indian politician
- Inturi Venkateswara Rao (1909–2002), Indian activist and journalist
- Vasu Inturi, Indian actor
