= Eswar =

Eswar may refer to the following people:

- Eswar (1938–2021), publicity designer in Telugu cinema
- Eswar Prasad (born 1965), Indian economist
- Theni Eswar, Indian cinematographer

== See also ==
- Eswars
