= Mangamma Sapatham =

Mangamma Sabatham (alternatively Sapatham or Sabadham; lit. 'Mangamma's oath') may refer to these Indian films:

- Mangamma Sabatham (1943 film), 1943 Tamil language film
- Mangamma Sapatham (1965 film), 1965 Telugu language film
- Mangamma Sabadham (1985 film), 1985 Tamil language film

== See also ==
- Mangamma (disambiguation)
