= Humshakal (1974 film) =

- Poster
- Directed by: Jambulingam
- Written by: Inder Raj Anand (dialogue); Poovai Krishnan (story)
- Based on: Baalu Belagithu (Kannada)
- Produced by: T.Govindarajan
- Starring: Rajesh Khanna; Moushumi Chatterjee; Tanuja
- Cinematography: P. L. Roy
- Edited by: C. P. Jambulingam
- Music by: R. D. Burman
- Production company: Venus Pictures
- Distributed by: Venus Pictures
- Release date: 19 April 1974
- Running time: 135 mins
- Country: India
- Language: Hindi

Humshakal (transl. Lookalike) is a 1974 Hindi-language film directed by Jambulingam. The film stars Rajesh Khanna, Moushumi Chatterjee, Tanuja in lead roles. The music was by R. D. Burman and lyrics were by Anand Bakshi. The film was a remake of the 1970 Kannada film Baalu Belagithu, which was also remade in Telugu as Manchivadu (1973) and in Tamil as Oorukku Uzhaippavan (1976).

The songs of the film were extremely popular, with the Kishore-Asha duet song "Hum Tum Gum Sum" topping the charts for more than a year. The tune of the Rafi-Lata duet "Kahe Ko Bulaya" was even adapted as a religious song in subsequent decades. Kishore Kumar considered the song "Rasta Dekhe Tera Vyakul Man Mera" as close to his heart.

As per the review by The Hindu newspaper, the box office collections of India, it is R. D. Burman who stands out with some delightful compositions and the box office status is mentioned as average hit."

== Cast ==
- Rajesh Khanna as Ram / Laxman (Double Role)
- Moushumi Chatterjee as Radha
- Tanuja as Lalita
- Aruna Irani as Vimla
- Asrani as Chakram
- Jagdeep as Biharilal
- David as Judge
- Ramesh Behl as Sagar

== Plot ==
Radha (Moushumi Chatterjee) is a poor girl and lives with her ailing mother. Once, when she is out to purchase medicine for her mother a goon, tries to outrage her modesty and follows her till her house. Laxman (Rajesh Khanna) is also a poor youth. Incidentally, he comes across Radha and saves her from the clutches of the goon. On the request of the dying old lady Laxman promises to take care of her daughter.

Sagar is a gang leader and forces young girls to blackmail rich men. While the gang leader was charging a young girl for not performing her duty well, his informer tells him about two Arab merchants (Rajesh Khanna and Asrani) who will be present in a ball room party. Sagar reaches the ball room with his man. He asks his man to sit with a revolver and keep eye on the two merchants to find out their real intentions. One of the Arab merchants (Rajesh Khanna) dances with a lady (Aruna Irani) and shows her a photograph of three sisters. This lady is also in the photograph. The Arab merchant whispers into her ear that he had promised her dying sister to find out the murderer and thus needs her help. She is about to divulge information about the murderer when the man, who is keeping eye on them, shot her dead.

Laxman, in order to keep his promise to the old lady, takes care of Radha. However, soon society starts questioning about their relationship. In a fit of rage, Laxman marries Radha in a temple. The newly-wedded woman knows nothing about her husband and thus asks him about his work and designation. He tells her that he works in Ratan Mahal in different positions according to the demand of the situation, except for the position of the boss.

In Ratan Mahal, all the servants greet their boss on his arrival. The six-year-old daughter of the boss called Rani comes out of a room and expresses her anger to her dad for being absent for many days from Ratan Mahal. She also wants to know when he is bringing her mother Lalita (Tanuja) home. However, she is not aware that her mother is suffering from mental illness and thus is staying at an asylum. In the meantime, the search for the murderer is on by the two people, who this time, impersonate as jewellery merchants.

A few years later, new developments take place. Radha gives birth to a baby boy and Lalita recovers from her mental illness. However, the doctor warns her that any kind of shock would affect her health again. After returning home, Lalita insists on visiting a temple on the occasion of Shivratri Puja with her husband and daughter. Inside the temple premises, Rani gets lost and coincidentally, Radha takes her back to her mother Lalita, who keeps waiting near the car on the road while Rani's dad keeps searching for her. For this act of kindness, Lalita develops a friendship with Radha and invites her to Ratan Mahal. Both the ladies also talk about their respective husbands. Things take a shocking turn when Radha's baby is ill and reaches Ratan Mahal to find her husband Laxman playing Ram, the husband of Lalita and the boss of the Ratan Mahal. She accuses him of cheating both the women. After recalling the doctor's warning about not giving any shock to Lalita, he denies playing a double role. He tells Radha that he is Ram and doesn't know anything about her.

Later, Radha leaves a letter for her husband informing him about their son's death and goes missing. On the other hand, Ram needs to visit Mumbai for accomplishing his secret mission of finding the murderer. Lalita insists on going with him. He couldn't deny the request and thus takes his wife and daughter to Mumbai. They checked into a hotel where Ram receives a call from Chakram (Ashrani), his helper in the secret mission. Lalita hears their conversation and she again falls ill. Ram calls for a doctor. He is shocked to see Radha as the nurse, who is known as Sita.

Ram is about to succeed in his mission when Sagar informs him that his wife and daughter are kidnapped. Ram and his friends come to the kidnapper and fight. Police come there and arrest the gang leader and his goons. Now, the case is in the court where Ram is standing in the witness box and narrates a story.

According to the story, Ram and his wife Lalita had taken their infant girl in a baby stroller for a walk. While they were talking the baby, the stroller moved accidentally on the road and a look-alike of Ram saved the baby. Then Ram came to know that he was Laxman and works as a labourer in Ratan Mahal, where Ram was the boss. Ram wanted to repay him for his kindness, but Laxman refused to take anything as his seven generations served at the Ratan Mahal and earned their bread and butter. Meanwhile, Ram remembered that Lalita was lying unconscious on the road. Ram asks Laxman to take care of the baby and sets out to take Lalita to a doctor. On the way, a woman named Mala stops his car and demands a heavy ransom. She calls him to a hotel to receive the money. In the hotel, she tells Ram about Sagar, who had actually forced her to blackmail him. She was asking him to leave the hotel as soon as possible when Sagar arrived, shot her and absconded. Before dying, she tells about her two sisters who were also in the clutches of this gang leader and were forced to blackmail rich people. To recognize them she gives him a photograph.

Now, police were investigating Ram on the charges of murdering Mala. Ram asks Laxman to act as Ram and to stay at the Ratan Mahal as the boss. He also gives Laxman the photograph and asks him to search for the murderer. Laxman promised that he would never let anyone know about the name exchange. After listening to Ram, the judge frees him and gives the death sentence to the criminal Sagar. At the end, Ram and Laxman decide to stay together like two brothers.

== Songs ==
All lyrics written by Anand Bakshi.

Song	Singer
"Rasta Dekhe Tera"	Kishore Kumar
"Jhoomo Tum Nacho"	Kishore Kumar
"Hum Tum, Gumsum Raat Milan Ki"	Kishore Kumar, Asha Bhosle
"Main Tumko Doongi Saiyan Pyar Ki Nishani"	Kishore Kumar, Asha Bhosle
"Kahe Ko Bulaya Mujhe Balma Pyar Mein Naam Se"	Lata Mangeshkar, Mohammed Rafi
"Dekho Mujhe Dekho"	Asha Bhosle
"Udti Chidiya Udte Udte"	Asha Bhosle
