= Humshakal =

Humshakal (lit. 'lookalike') may refer to:

- Humshakal (1974 film), 1974 Indian film
- Humshakal (1992 film), 1992 Indian film
- Humshakals, a 2014 Indian romantic comedy film by Sajid Khan
