= Mangamma =

Mangamma is the name of the Hindu goddess Alamelu. It may also refer to:

- Mangamma (film), a 1997 Malayalam language film
- Mangamma Gari Manavadu, a 1984 Telugu language film
- Mangamma Sapatham (disambiguation)
  - Mangamma Sapatham (1943 film), a Tamil language film
  - Mangamma Sapatham (1965 film), a Telugu language film
  - Mangamma Sabadham (1985 film), a Tamil language film

== See also ==
- Mangammal (died 1705), queen regent of the Madurai Nayak kingdom
