= D. V. S. Raju =

Indian film producer

- Born: Datla Venkata Suryanarayana Raju; 13 December 1928; Allavaram, East Godavari district, Andhra Pradesh, India
- Died: 13 November 2010 (aged 81); Hyderabad, Andhra Pradesh, India
- Occupation: Film producer
- Father: Datla Balarama Raju
- Awards: Padma Shri (2001); Raghupathi Venkaiah Award (1988)

Datla Venkata Suryanarayana Raju (13 December 1928 – 13 November 2010), widely known as D. V. S. Raju, was an Indian film producer known for his work in Telugu cinema. He is credited with playing a pivotal role in relocating the Telugu film industry from Madras to Hyderabad. Over his career, he produced around 25 films, including successful Telugu productions such as Maa Babu (1960), Mangamma Sapadham (1965), Pidugu Ramudu (1966), Tikka Sankarayya (1968), Gandikota Rahasyam (1969), and Jeevana Jyothi (1975), as well as the Hindi film Mujhe Insaaf Chaahiye (1983).

Raju held several prominent leadership roles in the Indian film industry, including serving as the Honorary Secretary of the South Indian Film Chamber of Commerce in 1966 and as a jury member for the 15th National Film Awards. From 1979 to 1980, he was the President of the Film Federation of India. As Chairman of the National Film Development Corporation (NFDC), Raju was instrumental in co-funding the Academy Award-winning film Gandhi (1982). He also served as Chairman of the Andhra Pradesh State Film Development Corporation. In recognition of his contributions to Indian cinema, Raju was awarded the Raghupathi Venkaiah Award in 1988 and the Padma Shri in 2001.

== Early life ==
Datla Venkata Suryanarayana Raju was born on 13 December 1928 to Datla Balarama Raju and Subhadrayamma in Allavaram, East Godavari district, Andhra Pradesh (now part of Konaseema district). His father, Datla Balarama Raju served as a Member of Parliament for the Narasapuram constituency, representing the Lok Sabha for two consecutive terms from 1962 to 1971.

== Career ==
=== Early career ===
After completing his degree in Kakinada, Raju became a partner in Cine Litho Works, a company specializing in printing film posters. His management of the Madras branch and innovations in the offset printing process helped him build connections in the film industry, particularly with N. T. Rama Rao, through a mutual friend, T. V. Raju.

=== Partnership with NAT Films ===
Raju gained Rama Rao’s appreciation by producing high-quality posters for the latter's first home production Pichi Pullayya (1953). He later became a partner in NAT Films, the production company of Rama Rao and his brother N. Trivikrama Rao. As a financier, he supported the production of several successful films under NAT Films, including Thodu Dongalu (1954), Jayasimha (1955), Panduranga Mahatyam (1957), and Gulebakavali Katha (1962).

=== Expanding into film production ===
While Panduranga Mahatyam was still under production, Raju ventured into dubbing films, working on the Telugu film Penki Pellam (1956), which he released in Tamil as Kanniyane Kadimai. Following this, he co-produced the bilingual film Maa Babu (1960) under Pragati Art Productions. Directed by Tatineni Prakash Rao, the film was based on the Hindi movie Chirag Kahan Roshni Kahan (1959) and starred Akkineni Nageswara Rao and Savitri in lead roles.

=== Founding D.V.S. Productions ===
In 1964, Raju founded his own production company, D.V.S. Productions. His first film under this banner was the folklore drama Mangamma Sapatham (1965). This film, which featured Rama Rao in the roles of both father and son, became a commercial success, running for over 100 days in several centers. Raju's decision to produce a folklore film was inspired by the success of Rama Rao's earlier folklore movies and the popularity of the genre at the time. The film was directed by the renowned folklore filmmaker B. Vittalacharya, and was based on the 1943 Tamil film Mangamma Sabatham.

=== Notable films ===
Raju went on to produce around 25 films, including notable films such as Pidugu Ramudu (1966), Tikka Sankarayya (1968), Gandikota Rahasyam (1969), Chinnanaati Snehithulu (1971), Jeevana Jyothi (1975), Jeevitha Nouka (1977) and Chanakya Sapatham (1986). He also produced the Hindi film Mujhe Insaaf Chaahiye (1983).

Jeevana Jyothi earned critical acclaim and won the state Nandi Award. His production Pidugu Ramudu and his other films with Rama Rao became key milestones in his career.

=== Leadership and industry contributions ===
Raju held several leadership roles in the film industry throughout his career. In 1966, he was elected as the Honorary Secretary of the South Indian Film Chamber of Commerce (SIFCC), and in 1967, he served as a Jury Member at the 15th National Film Awards. From 1979 to 1980, he was President of the Film Federation of India and later served as Chairman of the National Film Development Corporation of India (NFDC). During his time at NFDC, he helped co-fund Gandhi (1982), which won eight Academy Awards. Raju served as Chairman of the Andhra Pradesh State Film Development Corporation twice, in 1989 and again from 2002 to 2004. He played a key role in organizing the International Film Festival of India (Filmotsav) in Hyderabad in 1986, with the support of then-Chief Minister N. T. Rama Rao. During his tenure, he oversaw the construction of the Telugu Lalitha Kala Thoranam, completed in time for the festival.

One of Raju’s most significant achievements was his role in relocating the Telugu film industry from Madras to Hyderabad. His efforts, along with other industry stalwarts, were instrumental in establishing Hyderabad as the centre of Telugu cinema. He also founded the Film Nagar Cultural Centre (FNCC) in Hyderabad, which remains a key institution in the film community.

== Personal life ==
D. V. S. Raju married Anasuya Devi in 1948, and they had three daughters and two sons. He died on 13 November 2010 at the age of 81 after a brief illness.

D. V. S. Raju's son-in-law, K. L. N. Raju, ventured into film production with his debut as a producer in the 2018 film Anaganaga O Premakatha.

== Filmography ==
| Year | Film | Language | Notes |
|---|---|---|---|
| 1960 | Maa Babu | Telugu | |
| 1961 | Anbumagan | Tamil | |
| 1965 | Mangamma Sapatham | Telugu | |
| 1966 | Pidugu Ramudu | Telugu | |
| 1968 | Tikka Sankarayya | Telugu | |
| 1969 | Gandikota Rahasyam | Telugu | |
| 1971 | Chinnanaati Snehithulu | Telugu | |
| 1973 | Dhanama? Daivama? | Telugu | |
| 1975 | Jeevana Jyoti | Telugu | Nandi Award for Best Feature Film Filmfare Award for Best Film – Telugu |
| 1975 | Devudulanti Manishi | Telugu | |
| 1977 | Jeevitha Nouka | Telugu | |
| 1978 | Kalanthakulu | Telugu | |
| 1979 | President Peramma | Telugu | |
| 1980 | Alludu Pattina Bharatham | Telugu | |
| 1981 | Pralaya Geetham | Telugu | |
| 1983 | Mujhe Insaaf Chahiye | Hindi | |
| 1984 | Marchandi Mana Chattalu | Telugu | |
| 1986 | Chanakya Sapatham | Telugu | |
| 1986 | Jayam Manade | Telugu | |
| 1987 | Bhanumathi gari Mogudu | Telugu | |
| 1990 | Doshi Nirdoshi | Telugu | |
| 1992 | Champion | Telugu | |
| 1993 | Rajadhani | Telugu | |

== Awards ==
- Filmfare Award for Best Film - Telugu - Jeevana Jyothi (1975)
- Nandi Award for Best Feature Film - Gold - Jeevana Jyothi (1975)
- Raghupathi Venkaiah Award by Andhra Pradesh Government in 1988
- Padma Shri award by Government of India in 2001
- Bhishma Award

== See also ==
- Raghupathi Venkaiah Award
