= Baalu Belagithu =

1970 film

- Directed by: Siddalingaiah
- Written by: Siddalingaiah
- Produced by: K. S. Prasad; B V Srinivas; A S Bhakthavathsalam
- Starring: Rajkumar; Jayanthi; Bharathi
- Cinematography: R. Chittibabu
- Edited by: P. Bhaktavatsalam
- Music by: Vijaya Bhaskar
- Distributed by: Chitrashree International
- Release date: 1970
- Running time: 145 minutes
- Country: India
- Language: Kannada

Baalu Belagithu is a 1970 Indian Kannada language drama film written and directed by Siddalingaiah. It stars Rajkumar, Jayanthi and Bharathi. The film was released under Chitrashree International banner and produced by K S Prasad, B V Srinivas and A S Bhakthavathsalam. It was remade in Telugu as Manchivadu, in Hindi as Humshakal and in Tamil as Oorukku Uzhaippavan.

== Cast ==
- Rajkumar as Shankar / Papanna (dual roles)
- Jayanthi as Lalitha
- Bharathi as Lakshmi
- Dwarakish as Kitty
- RT Rama as Sheela
- T. B. Nagappa
- Prabhakar as The ruffian who attacks Lakshmi
- Shanthamma
- Jyothi Lakshmi in an item song "Hennu Aadidaaga"

== Soundtrack ==
The music of the film was composed by Vijaya Bhaskar and lyrics for the soundtrack written by Chi. Udaya Shankar and Vijaya Narasimha.

=== Track list ===
#	Title	Singer(s)
1	"Cheluvada Muddada"	P. B. Sreenivas, P. Susheela
2	"Kamalada Hoovinda"	P. B. Sreenivas
3	"Neethivantha Baalale Beku"	P. B. Sreenivas
4	"Hennu Aadidaaga"	L. R. Eswari

== See also ==
- Kannada films of 1970
