= Maya Maschindra (1975 film) =

- Theatrical release poster
- Directed by: Babubhai Mistry
- Written by: Gabbita Venkata Rao (story / dialogues)
- Screenplay by: Babu Bhai Mistry
- Produced by: Pinjala Subba Rao
- Starring: N. T. Rama Rao; Vanisri
- Cinematography: K. S. Prasad
- Edited by: Kanda Swamy
- Music by: Satyam
- Production company: P. S. R. Pictures
- Release date: 9 July 1975
- Running time: 138 mins
- Country: India
- Language: Telugu

Maya Maschindra is a 1975 Indian Telugu-language Hindu mythological film, produced by Pinjala Subba Rao under the P.S.R. Pictures banner and directed by Babu Bhai Mistry. It stars N. T. Rama Rao, Vanisri with music composed by Satyam.

== Cast ==
- N. T. Rama Rao as Vishnu / Maya Machhindra
- Vanisri as Lakshmi / Tilottama Devi
- Ramakrishna as Siva / Ghoraknath
- Kanta Rao as Narada Maharshi
- K. V. Chalam as Vaidyanath
- Arjan Janardana Rao as Hanuman
- P. J. Sarma
- Kanchana as Jagan Mohini
- P. R. Varalakshmi
- Dhanasri as Kaalindi
- Anitha as Parvathi

== Soundtrack ==
Maya Maschindra

Film score by Satyam
- Released: 1975
- Genre: Soundtrack
- Length: 27:03
- Label: AVM Audio
- Producer: Satyam

Satyam chronology
Raktha Sambandhaalu (1975)	Maya Maschindra (1975)	Thota Ramudu (1975)

Music composed by Satyam. Music released by AVM Audio Company.

S. No.	Song title	Lyrics	Singers	length
1	"Tharaka Namame"	Gabbita Venkata Rao	S. P. Balasubrahmanyam	3:50
2	"Sudha Neeke"	Dasaradhi	S. Janaki	3:53
3	"Magaraya Panthalelara"	Aarudhra	P. Susheela	4:13
4	"Pranaya Raaga"	C. Narayana Reddy	S. P. Balasubrahmanyam, P. Susheela	4:03
5	"Ghallu Ghallumani"	Sri Sri	P. Susheela	3:21
6	"Rajaneekara Raraa"	Aarudhra	V. Ramakrishna, P. Susheela	3:59
7	"Vilayame"	Gabbita Venkata Rao	S. P. Balasubrahmanyam	3:44
