= Tikka Sankarayya =

- Theatrical release poster
- Directed by: D. Yoganand
- Written by: D. V. Narasa Raju (dialogues)
- Produced by: D. V. S. Raju
- Starring: N. T. Rama Rao; Krishna Kumari; Jayalalithaa
- Cinematography: G. K. Ramu
- Edited by: G. D. Joshi
- Music by: T. V. Raju
- Production company: D.V.S. Productions
- Release date: 29 March 1968
- Running time: 157 minutes
- Country: India
- Language: Telugu

Tikka Sankarayya (transl. Crack Sankarayya) is a 1968 Indian Telugu-language comedy film directed by D. Yoganand and produced by D. V. S. Raju. It stars N. T. Rama Rao, Krishna Kumari and Jayalalithaa, with music composed by T. V. Raju.

== Plot ==
Raghavayya, a middle-class villager, lives with his overbearing wife, Kantamma, and his two daughters, Suseela and Rani. Kantamma mistreats Suseela for being her stepdaughter. Meanwhile, a charismatic young man named Mohan visits the family to arrange his marriage with Rani but instead falls in love with Suseela. Lingaraju, a loan shark, also wants to marry Suseela. He offers to forgo all of Raghavayya's debt in exchange for marrying Suseela. Overhearing the conversation, Mohan decides to repay the debt, and asks his father, Kodandaramayya, who refuses to give his son money. An angered Mohan decides to leave the house in protest, but his mother gives her the money by selling her jewelry. Kanthamma forces Suseela to marry Lingaraju, but Suseela escapes before the marriage can take place. Kanthamma falsifies the marriage, marrying Lingaraju to their maid instead. Mohan witnesses the wedding, believing that Suseela and Lingjaru got married. Suseela and Mohan encounter each other on the same train to the city. Mohan rejects Suseela's advances, still thinking she is married. Soon after, Mohan gets into an accident and is hospitalized. Suseela meets him in the hospital, where Mohan finally rejects her. Mohan accidentally leaves his briefcase full of money behind, and Suseela returns it to his father. He appreciates Suseela's honesty, accepting her as his daughter-in-law as they await Mohan's arrival.

During an argument with Kantamma, Lingjaru discovers he married a maid instead of Suseela. Kantamma promises to find Suseela and perform the marriage once and for all. Kantamma sends her brother Devayya to search for Suseela, and he runs into Mohan. Devayya explains the situation to Mohan, and both go searching for Suseela. Sankaram, a madman who resembles Mohan, flees from a mental hospital. The staff of the mental hospital confuses Mohan with Sankaram and brings Mohan to the mental hospital. Devayya, believing Sankaram to be Mohan, brings him back to their village. Eventually, Sankaram and Rani fall in love. Sankaram's father visits Mohan in the hospital but realizes Mohan is not his son, and he is released. Before Mohan returns, Suseela gets a letter from Kantamma saying that Mohan is ready to marry Rani. Distressed, Suseela leaves the house. Upon his return, Mohan reads the letter and searches for Suseela to resolve the misunderstanding. Once reaching the village, Suseela tries to convince Sankaram to marry her, believing him to be Mohan. An angered Lingjaru backstabs Sankaram and kidnaps Suseela. After regaining consciousness, Sankaram regains his memory and reveals he is not Mohan. Just as he is about to leave, Rani stops him and proclaims her love for him. Mohan then rescues Suseela from Lingjaru, and Lingaraju accepts the maid as his wife. The movie ends with Mohan marrying Suseela and Sankaram marrying Rani.

== Cast ==
- N. T. Rama Rao as Mohan and Sankaram (dual role)
- Krishna Kumari as Suseela
- Jayalalithaa as Rani
- V. Nagayya as Raghavayya
- Nagabhushanam as Lingaraju
- Rajanala as Sodabuddi Subbayya
- Relangi as Madman
- Allu Ramalingayya as Sidhanthi
- Padmanabham as Devayya
- Raja Babu as Madman
- Suryakantam as Kanthamma
- Hemalatha as Mohan's mother
- Dr. Sivaramakrishnayya as Kodandaramayya
- Raavi Kondala Rao as Madman
- Balakrishna as Appanna
- Mukku Raju as Dance Teacher

== Music ==
Music was composed by T. V. Raju. Lyrics were written by C. Narayana Reddy.

Song title	Singers	Length
"Tholi Kodi Kusindi"	P. Suseela	3:22
"Mucchata Golipe"	P. Suseela	3:53
"Kovela Erugani"	Ghantasala, P. Suseela	3:59
"Vagakaada"	P. Suseela	3:47
"Aisarabajjaa"	Ghantasala, P. Suseela	4:38
"Yaskodi Tassadiyya"	Ghantasala, P. Suseela	2:40
