= Raghupathi Venkaiah Award =

State award of Andhra Pradesh for contributions to Telugu Cinema

Raghupati VenkaiahAward
- Award for contributions to Telugu Cinema
- Awarded for: Lifetime Achievement
- Sponsored by: Government of Andhra Pradesh
- Reward: ₹50,000 (US$530)
- First award: 1981

Highlights
- Total awarded: 38
- First winner: L. V. Prasad
- Recent winner: Yandamuri Veerendranath

The Raghupathi Venkaiah Award is an award given by the Indian state government of Andhra Pradesh to recognise lifetime achievements in Telugu cinema. The award was introduced in 1981 in honour of Raghupathi Venkaiah Naidu, one of India's film pioneers, who is considered the "father of Telugu cinema". The winner is presented a Golden Nandi (named after a bull in Hindu mythology), a gold medal, a citation and a cash prize of ₹50,000 (US$530) at the Nandi Awards ceremony.

== Recipients ==
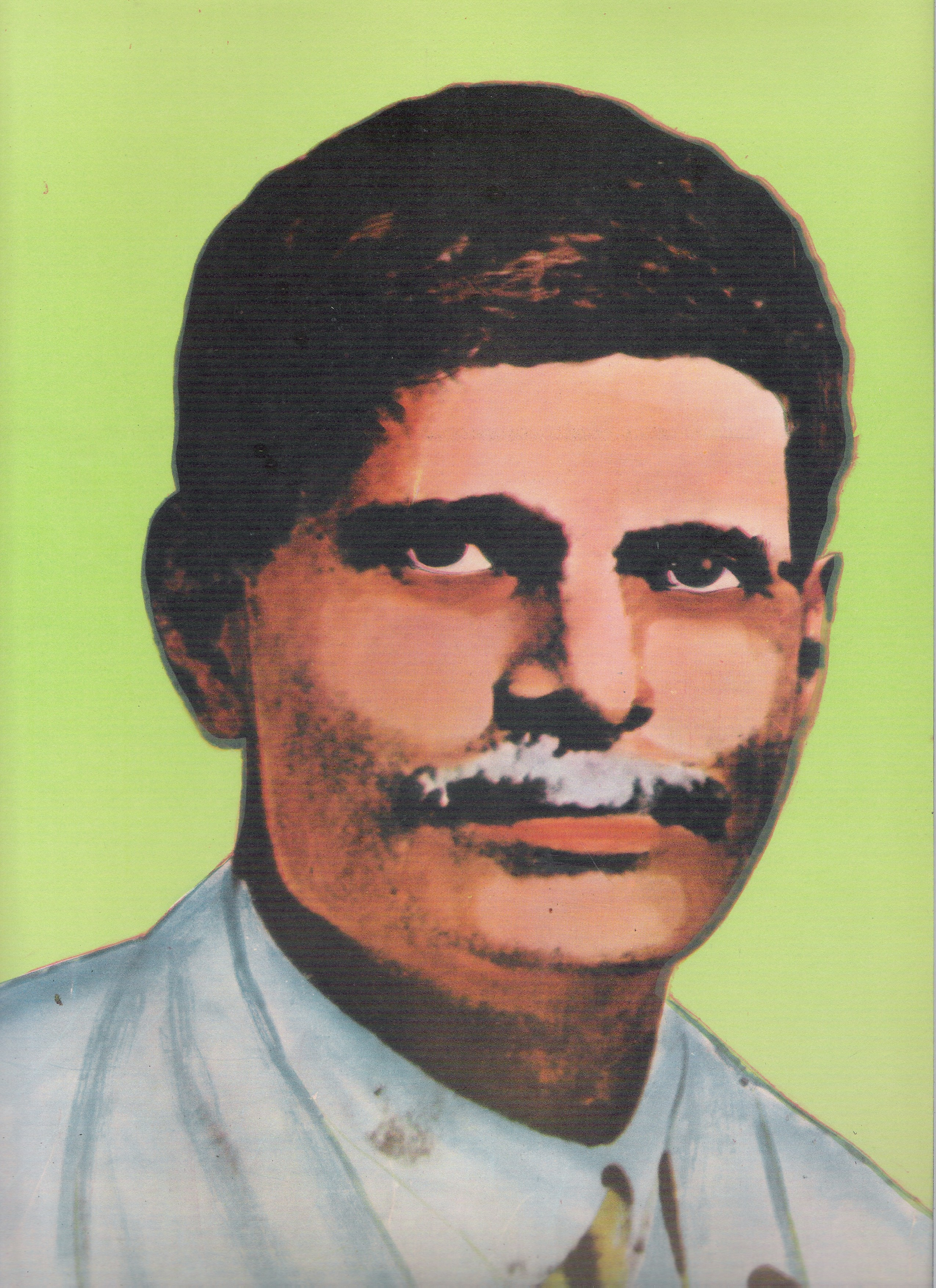
The namesake of the award: Raghupathi Venkaiah Naidu

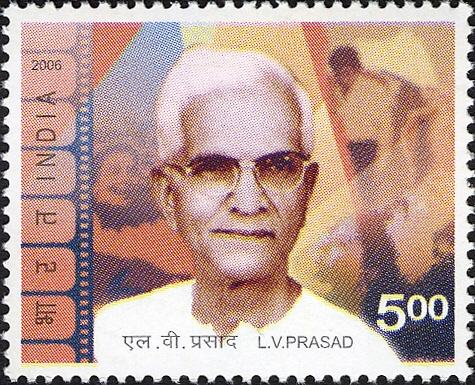
The first recipient: L. V. Prasad

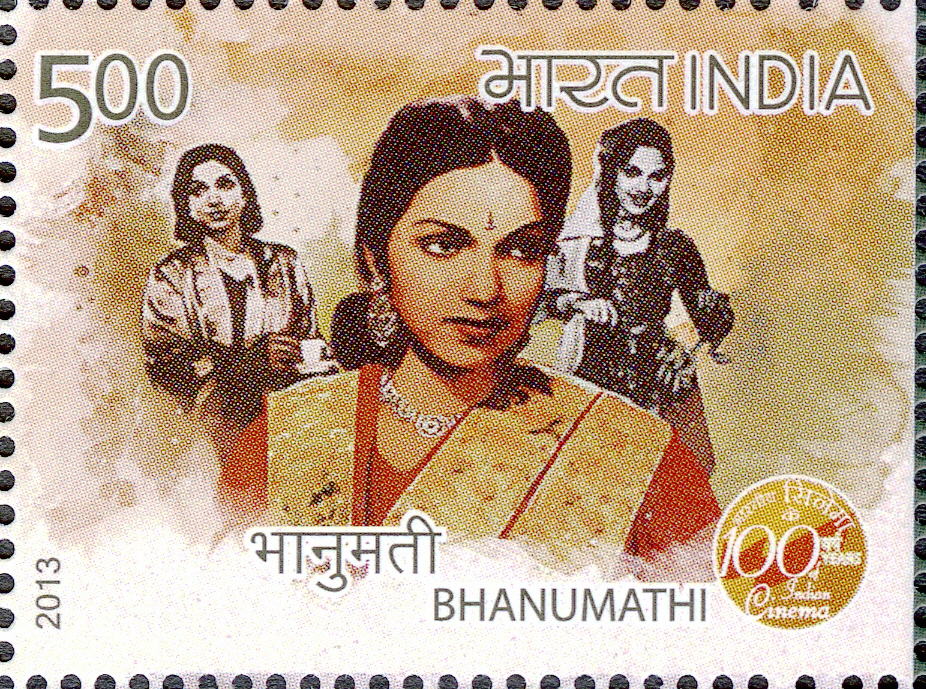
The first woman recipient: Bhanumathi Ramakrishna

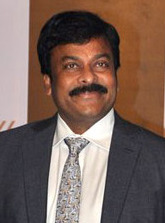
The recent recipient: Chiranjeevi

List of award recipients
Year	Recipient	Field of work	Ref.
1980	L. V. Prasad	Director, producer	
1981	P. Pullayya	Director, producer	
1982	B. A. Subba Rao	Director, producer	
1983	M. A. Rahman	Cinematographer	
1984	Kosaraju Raghavayya	Lyricist, poet, actor	
1985	Bhanumathi	Actor, producer, singer, music director, director, writer	
1986	Bapu	Director	
1986	Mullapudi Venkata Ramana	Writer	
1987	B. Nagi Reddy	Producer	
1988	D. V. S. Raju	Producer	
1989	Akkineni Nageswara Rao	Actor	
1990	Dasari Narayana Rao	Director, producer, actor	
1991	K. Viswanath	Director	
1992	S. Rajeswara Rao	Composer	
1993	D. Madhusudhana Rao	Producer	
1994	Anjali Devi	Actress	
1995	K. S. Prakash Rao	Actor, cinematographer, director, producer	
1996	Inturi Venkateswara Rao	Film journalist	
1997	V. Madhusudhana Rao	Director, producer, screenwriter	
1998	Gummadi	Actor	
1999	Santha Kumari	Actress, producer	
2000	Tadepalli Lakshmi Kanta Rao	Actor, producer	
2001	Allu Ramalingaiah	Actor	
2002	P. Susheela	Playback singer	
2003	V. B. Rajendra Prasad	Producer	
2004	Krishnaveni	Actress, producer	
2005	M. S. Reddy	Director, producer, writer	
2006	D. Ramanaidu	Producer, actor	
2007	Tammareddy Krishna Murthy	Producer	
2008	Vijaya Nirmala	Actress, director, producer	
2009	K. Raghava	Producer	
2010	M. Balaiah	Director, producer	
2011	Kaikala Satyanarayana	Actor, director, producer	
2012	Kodi Ramakrishna	Director	
2013	Vanisri	Actress	
2014	Krishnam Raju	Actor	
2015	Eswar	Writer, publicity designer	
2016	Chiranjeevi	Actor	

== See also ==
- Dadasaheb Phalke Award
