= Pidugu Ramudu =

1966 film directed by B. Vittalacharya

Pigudu Ramudu
- Theatrical release poster
- Directed by: B. Vittalacharya
- Written by: Samudrala Jr. (dialogues)
- Produced by: D. V. S. Raju
- Starring: N. T. Rama Rao; Rajasree
- Cinematography: S. K. Varadarajan
- Edited by: G. D. Joshi
- Music by: T. V. Raju
- Production company: D.V.S. Productions
- Release date: 10 September 1966
- Running time: 156 mins
- Country: India
- Language: Telugu

Pigudu Ramudu (transl. Thunder Ramu) is a 1966 Indian Telugu-language swashbuckling fantasy film directed by B. Vittalacharya. It stars N. T. Rama Rao and Rajasree, with music composed by T. V. Raju.

== Cast ==
- N. T. Rama Rao as Ramu
- Rajasree as Madhumathi
- Rajanala as Gajendra Varma
- Relangi as Maharaju
- Mikkilineni as Koyadora
- Padmanabham as Sivangi
- Allu Ramalingaiah as Papalu
- Raja Babu as Mallu
- Jagga Rao as Parvathalu
- Vanisri as Singi
- L. Vijayalakshmi as Chaya
- Rushyendramani as Ramu's mother
- Manimala as Hema
- Meena Kumari as Jaya

== Soundtrack ==
Pidugu Ramudu

Film score by T. V. Raju
- Released: 1966
- Genre: Soundtrack
- Length: 31:13
- Label: SAREGAMA Audio
- Producer: T. V. Raju

Music composed by T. V. Raju.

S. No.	Song title	Lyrics	Singers	length
1	"Ee Reye Neevu Nenu"	C. Narayana Reddy	Ghantasala, P. Susheela	4:32
2	"Pilichina Palukavu"	C. Narayana Reddy	Ghantasala, P. Susheela	3:07
3	"Chinadana Chinadana"	C. Narayana Reddy	Ghantasala, L. R. Eswari	3:11
4	"Kommallo Palapitta"	Kosaraju	P. Susheela	3:59
5	"Mila Mila Merise"	C. Narayana Reddy	P. Susheela	3:13
6	"Nindu Amaasa"	Kosaraju	Madhavapeddi Satyam, L. R. Eswari	3:23
7	"Raaraa Kougilichera"	C. Narayana Reddy	P. Susheela	3:33
8	"Rangulu Rangulu"	C. Narayana Reddy	P. Susheela, L. R. Eswari	3:03
9	"Manase Vennelaga"	C. Narayana Reddy	Ghantasala, P. Susheela	3:12
