= Mujhe Insaaf Chahiye =

1983 film by T. Rama Rao

- Directed by: T. Rama Rao
- Story by: D. Rameswari
- Based on: Nyayam Kavali by D. Rameswari
- Produced by: D. V. S. Raju
- Starring: Mithun Chakraborty; Rati Agnihotri; Rekha; Ranjeeta; Danny Denzongpa
- Cinematography: S. Gopala Reddy
- Music by: Laxmikant–Pyarelal
- Production company: D. V. S. Productions
- Release date: 23 September 1983
- Country: India
- Language: Hindi

Mujhe Insaaf Chahiye (transl. I want justice) is a 1983 Indian Hindi-language legal drama film directed by T. Rama Rao and produced by D. V. S. Raju. The film stars Mithun Chakraborty, Rati Agnihotri, Rekha, Ranjeeta, Danny Denzongpa in pivotal roles. It is a remake of the Telugu film Nyayam Kavali. Rekha received a nomination for Filmfare Award for Best Supporting Actress, the only nomination for the film.

== Plot ==
Malti (Rati Agnihotri), a young girl from a middle-class family meets Suresh Rai (Mithun Chakraborty), who is the son of a well-known lawyer Dayashankar Rai (Danny Denzongpa). After a brief romance Malti finds out that she is pregnant. When Suresh refuses to marry her and she decides against aborting the baby, her parents disown her. Malti decides to take Suresh to court. She is supported in this fight by Shakuntala (Rekha) a lawyer who works for women's rights and has an illegitimate daughter from Dayashankar Rai. The case gets much publicity and public support as well. The Judge rules in Malti's favour but Malti refuses to marry Suresh and decides to raise the child as a single mother. In the meantime Shakuntala dies of a heart attack and Malti promises to take care of her daughter as well.

Years later, Suresh who is married to Jayshree (Ranjeeta) runs into Malti. It turns out that her son is a talented boy. It is time for Suresh to gracefully own up for his mistake.

== Cast ==
- Rekha as Shakuntala
- Mithun Chakraborty as Suresh Rai
- Rati Agnihotri as Malti Agarwal
- Ranjeeta as Jayshree Rai
- Danny Denzongpa as Dayashankar Rai
- Seema Deo as Shanti Rai
- Asrani as Abdul Lateef
- Shreeram Lagoo as Viswanath Agarwal
- Shubha Khote as Mrs. Agarwal
- Manoj Kumar as Director Guest Appearance for taking screen test for upcoming movie CLERK

== Soundtrack ==
Lyrics: Anand Bakshi.

Song	Singer
"Haseena O Haseena"	Amit Kumar
"Laila O Meri Laila" – 1	Amit Kumar
"Laila O Meri Laila" – 2	Amit Kumar
"Nahin Main Woh" – 1	Asha Bhosle
"Nahin Main Woh" – 2	Asha Bhosle
"I Love You, Do You Love Me, Yeh Bhi Koi Poochhne Ki Baat"	Asha Bhosle; Shailendra Singh
"Premdoot Aaya, Prem Sandesha Laya"	Asha Bhosle; Abhijeet
