= Chanakya Sapatham =

1986 Telugu film starring Chiranjeevi

- Poster
- Directed by: K. Raghavendra Rao
- Screenplay by: K. Raghavendra Rao
- Story by: Paruchuri Brothers
- Produced by: D. V. S. Raju
- Starring: Chiranjeevi; Vijayashanti; Rao Gopal Rao
- Cinematography: K. S. Prakash
- Edited by: Kotagiri Venkateshwara Rao
- Music by: Chakravarthy
- Production company: D. V. S. Productions
- Release date: 18 December 1986
- Running time: 2 hours 28 minutes
- Country: India
- Language: Telugu

Chanakya Shapatham (transl. Chanakya's vow) is a 1986 Indian Telugu language action film starring Chiranjeevi, Vijayashanti, Rao Gopal Rao and Satyanarayana, produced by D. V. S. Raju and directed by K. Raghavendra Rao.

The film marked the third collaboration of Chiranjeevi with Raghavendra Rao after two highly successful films : Adavi Donga and Kondaveeti Raja. However, unlike their previous ventures, Chanakya Shapatham was a critical and commercial failure. Paruchuri brothers had scripted all three films.

== Plot ==
Chanakya, a customs officer at an airport, is the son of a Military Major who is about to be awarded Padma Shri for his services. Chanakya catches the smuggling ring of Rana, and in retaliation they frame Chanakya's father for smuggling diamonds. Faced with humiliation, Chanakya challenges the villains of proving his father's innocence and bringing the culprits to justice. Shashirekha, an airhostess who works with Chanakya, who has problems with her sister's family, for her mother-in-law always threatens for more dowry. The rest of the story deals with how both of them fight for their causes in settling their professional and personal issues and come out successfully to be united in the marital knot forms the story.

== Cast ==
Actor	Role
Chiranjeevi	Chanakya
Vijayashanti	Shashirekha "Shashi" (Voice Dubbed by Saritha)
Rao Gopal Rao	Rana
Kaikala Satyanarayana	Major Nagarjuna
Annapurna	Janaki, Chanakya's mother
Sudhakar	Chakri, Rana's son
Suthi Velu	Yugandhar
Sri Lakshmi	Chitti
Kantha Rao	Shashi's father
Suryakantham	Durgamma
Rajyalakshmi	Savithri
Sakshi Ranga Rao	Dr. Arogyam
Ranganath	Ranga
Chidathala Apparao	Jacky
Chitti Babu	Kaky
Chalapathi Rao	Damodharam, Senior Customs Officer
Eswara Rao	Shashi's brother
Y. Vijaya	Shashi's sister-in-law
Bob Christo	Nero, Diamonds Smuggler

== Soundtrack ==
The music was composed by Chakravarthy.

Track listing
No.	Title	Singer(s)	Length
1.	"Mellaga Alluko"	S. P. Balu, S. Janaki
2.	"Vari Vari Varichelo"	S. P. Balu, S. Janaki
3.	"Soku Thotalo"	S. P. Balu, S. Janaki
4.	"Vedi Vedi Valupulu"	S. P. Balu
5.	"Nee Banda Bada"	S. P. Balu, P. Susheela
