= Eswar (publicity designer) =

Indian publicity designer (1938–2021)

Kosana Eswara Rao
- కొసనా ఈశ్వరరావు
- Born: February 1, 1938; Palakollu, Andhra Pradesh, India
- Died: September 21, 2021 (aged 83); Chennai, Tamil Nadu, India
- Other names: Eswar
- Occupation: Film publicity designer
- Years active: 1967–2000
- Known for: Cinema poster design
- Spouse: Varalakshmi
- Children: 2 sons, 2 daughters
- Awards: Nandi Award (2011), Raghupathi Venkaiah Award (2015)

Kosana Eswara Rao (1 February 1938 – 21 September 2021), popularly known as Eswar, was an Indian film publicity and poster designer, and painter known for his work primarily in Telugu cinema, along with contributions to Tamil, Kannada, and Hindi films. Over a career spanning more than three decades, Eswar designed posters for over 2,600 films. He received the Nandi Award for Best Book on Telugu Cinema in 2011 for his book Cinema Poster, and in 2015, he was awarded the prestigious Raghupathi Venkaiah Award from the government of Andhra Pradesh in recognition of his significant contributions to the film industry.

== Early life ==
Eswar was born as Kosana Eswara Rao in Palakollu, a town in West Godavari district, Andhra Pradesh. He came from a family known for crafting festival idols. His family's artistic influence sparked his passion for drawing at an early age. Eswar first gained recognition when he drew a portrait of Mahatma Gandhi during an Independence Day event, which was widely praised.

Driven by his passion for art and film, Eswar left his studies at a polytechnic college in Kakinada and moved to Madras (now Chennai) with a friend's encouragement. He began working as an assistant to Ketha Sambamurthy at Ketha Studios. Later, Eswar set up his own publicity design studio, Eswar, in Madras. He became skilled in line drawing, allowing him to create posters without the use of offset printing, which was not widely available at the time.

== Film career ==
Eswar made his debut as a publicity designer with the 1967 Telugu film Sakshi, directed by Bapu, where he designed the film's color posters and logo, gaining recognition for his work. B. Nagi Reddi of Vijaya Productions hired him to design posters for Ram Aur Shyam (1967). Eswar was known for experimenting with design techniques, notably using a knife instead of a brush to create wall posters for Paapa Kosam (1968). His innovative approach was further recognized with the film Prema Nagar (1971), where he introduced line-drawing designs. Eswar also set trends in publicity by designing a 12-sheet poster for Alluri Sitarama Raju, (1974) which was widely praised. For Simhasanam (1986), he created a 24-sheet poster, which gained significant attention and became a standard practice in the film industry after its release.

By the 1970s, Eswar had become one of the most sought-after publicity designers in South India. He designed publicity materials for several major Tamil films released during Diwali in 1970, solidifying his reputation as a leading designer in the industry. His work included projects for top Tamil stars such as M. G. Ramachandran, Sivaji Ganesan, Gemini Ganesan, Jaishankar, and Sivakumar. His reputation led to Tamil Nadu Chief Minister M. Karunanidhi personally requesting him to create a portrait of politician C. N. Annadurai.

In his career of over three decades, Eswar designed posters for more than 2,600 films in multiple languages, including over 1,000 in Telugu, 500 each in Tamil and Kannada, and 150 in Hindi, along with a few in other languages. He served as the publicity designer for major production houses such as Vijaya Productions, AVM Productions, Gemini Studios, Annapurna Studios, Geetha Arts, Suresh Productions, and Vyjayanthi Movies. He also designed the logos for many prominent production companies. His final project was the film Devullu (2000).

Eswar was dedicated to improving his craft by studying books and analyzing Hindi film posters to incorporate new ideas into his designs. In addition to his design work, Eswar authored several books on film poster and publicity design, where he shared his knowledge and insights. His book, Cinema Poster, chronicles his experiences and the evolution of the poster design industry from 1931 until his retirement in 2000. Eswar also served as the president of the South Indian Publicity Designers Association for ten years, contributing to the advancement of the field.

== Other work ==
In collaboration with his brother Brahmam, Eswar started his own publicity design company called Jaya Ads, focusing on Kannada films. Many of the Telugu fonts used in print, electronic, and digital media today were created by Eswar and his brother.

The Tirumala Tirupati Devasthanams (TTD) asked Eswar to create paintings of Lord Venkateswara for their calendars, including Balaji Netradarsanam, Archananantara Darsanam, and Poolangi Seva Darsanam. Eswar fondly remembered sitting in front of the deity inside the temple for several days to sketch these works, calling it a memorable experience.

== Personal life ==
Eswar was married to Varalakshmi, and the couple had two sons and two daughters. He retired after completing his last project in 2000. Eswar died on 21 September 2021 in Chennai due to age-related illness.

== Awards and recognition ==
Eswar received the Nandi Award for Best Book on Telugu Cinema in 2011 for his book Cinema Poster, which detailed his experiences and artistic processes. In 2015, the government of Andhra Pradesh recognized his contributions to Indian cinema by awarding him the Raghupathi Venkaiah Award. Eeswar was the first publicity designer to receive this award, which had primarily been awarded to directors, producers, and actors until that time.

Eswar was invited by the Indo-Soviet Cultural Society to visit the former Soviet Union, and later to Hollywood, to study advanced techniques in poster design.
