= Vasantha Maligai =

1972 film by K. S. Prakash Rao

- Theatrical release poster
- Directed by: K. S. Prakash Rao
- Story by: Kousalya Dev
- Based on: Prema Nagar (Telugu)
- Produced by: D. Ramanaidu
- Starring: Sivaji Ganesan; Vanisri
- Cinematography: A. Vincent
- Edited by: K. A. Marthand; Narasimha Rao
- Music by: K. V. Mahadevan
- Production company: Vijaya & Suresh Combines
- Release date: 29 September 1972
- Running time: 162 minutes
- Country: India
- Language: Tamil

Vasantha Maligai (transl. Palace of Spring) is a 1972 Indian Tamil-language romance film directed by K. S. Prakash Rao and produced by D. Ramanaidu. The film stars Sivaji Ganesan and Vanisri. It is remake of the 1971 Telugu film Prema Nagar, which also directed by K. S. Prakash Rao himself and Vanisri reprised her role from original.

Vasantha Maligai was released on 29 September 1972 and became a major commercial success, running at the box office for nearly 750 days. A digitally restored version of the film was released on 8 March 2013, and another one on 21 June 2019.

== Plot ==
Anand is a rich playboy and an alcoholic. Aboard an aeroplane, he meets Latha, an air hostess. Latha lives with her father, mother, two brothers, and a sister. Her elder brother resides at home with his wife, but Latha is the highest earning member of the family. Latha's mother objects to her being an air hostess; she begs her to change profession so that she can be home at more decent hours.

While Anand is celebrating his birthday in a pub near his home, Latha arrives at the same pub for a job interview with the manager. However, the lustful manager, in the guise of interviewing her, tries to rape her. Anand hears Latha screaming, subdues the manager, rescues Latha, then drives her home. The next day, Latha goes to Anand's house to return the coat he had lent her the night before. She then asks him for a job, to which he agrees, hiring her as his secretary.

The next day Anand shows her around his house, and she meets his mother, elder brother Vijay, and sister-in-law. Latha soon notices that Anand is an alcoholic, and therefore wishes to resign, but a servant begs her not to because Anand's behaviour has changed for the better since meeting her.

Anand's fiancée comes to his home and starts ranting that she no longer wishes to marry him because he is an alcoholic. Meanwhile, his sister-in-law, who concludes that Latha has come to steal Anand's affections, disturbs his mother with these comments. Latha, however, assures the mother, after everyone has left the table, that she will, in fact, try and stop Anand from drinking. Later on, she catches him drinking with his servant Panchavarnam. His servant runs away upon seeing her, but Anand continues to drink. Latha throws the glass after arguing with him, infuriating Anand into throwing a glass bottle onto her forehead.

When Anand realises what he has done, he destroys all his bottles, promising Latha that he will never drink again. He confides in her the anguish of his soul, how when he was young both his father and his Ayya died. After this transformative incident, he announces that he is going to build a new palace for himself and the girl that he truly loves. He will call the palace "Vasantha Maligai" (palace of spring).

Anand brings Latha to this new house; everyone in his family goads Latha to find out who this mysterious woman is. Latha, too, is curious to meet the girl of Anand's heart. He then shows her her own reflection in a separate room revealing that she is the girl of his affections. However, Vijay witnesses this and runs to tell his mother. He conjures up a story about Latha having stolen his wife's jewellery. Hearing this, Anand becomes suspicious of Latha. He asks Latha about it, but she runs away, dejected that he could suspect her of such wrongdoing. Fortunately, Anand learns about Vijay's malicious plan.

Anand confesses his ignorance and apologises. But Latha does not forgive him. Anand loses his composure and becomes seriously ill. Meanwhile, Latha receives a marriage proposal. Anand's mother goes to apologise to Latha while Latha hands her an invitation to her wedding. Anand's mother shows this to her son, who then decides to attend the wedding. Latha is shocked to see him. She meets him privately to reconcile their differences, but her sister-in-law and the groom's mother spot them and announce it to the guests who depart, botching Latha's marriage. All of a sudden, Anand's mother enters the room and declares that Latha should marry Anand. When Latha arrives at the palace, she is shocked to see Anand's condition. She does not know that, out of desperation and lovesickness, he drank poison. As soon as Latha enters the room he collapses. Anand is hospitalised and after recovering, he re-unites with Latha.

== Cast ==
Lead

- Sivaji Ganesan as Ananth
- Vanisri as Latha

Supporting actors

- K. Balaji as Vijay Kumar "Vijay"
- Major Sundarrajan as Latha's father
- V. K. Ramasamy as Ananth's home butler
- Nagesh as Panchavarnam
- V. S. Raghavan as Ponnaiya
- Srikanth as Latha's elder brother
- S. V. Ramadas as the Hotel manager
- Senthamarai as Jameen Property Diwan
- C. R. Parthiban as an Aeroplane Passenger
- Venkatesh as Young Vijay Kumar (archival footage from Prema Nagar)

Supporting actresses

- Santha Kumari as Ananth and Vijay's mother (archival footage from Prema Nagar)
- Pandari Bai as Latha's mother
- Sukumari as Vimala, Vijay's wife
- Kumari Padmini as Srikanth's wife
- Rama Prabha as Panchavarnam's lover
- Sridevi as Vijay's daughter

Dancers

- C. I. D. Sakunthala as Dancer
- Aalam as Dancer
- L. Kanchana as Dancer

Guest appearances

- S. V. Ranga Rao as Ananth and Vijay's father (archival footage from Prema Nagar)
- S. V. Sahasranamam as Doctor
- T. K. Bhagavathi as Guest Appearance
- C. K. Saraswathi as Guest Appearance
- Pushpalatha as Ananth's guardian mother (Aaya)

== Production ==
Vasantha Maligai is a remake of the 1971 Telugu film Prema Nagar. D. Ramanaidu, the producer of the Telugu film, returned to produce the Tamil remake. A. Vincent worked as the cinematographer. J. Jayalalithaa initially signed on to play the female lead, but could not continue due to her mother's death; the role later went to Vanisri.

== Soundtrack ==
The music was composed by K. V. Mahadevan, with lyrics by Kannadasan. The song "Oru Kinnathai" was remixed by Yathish Mahadev in Indira Vizha (2009).

Song	Singers	Length
"O Maanida Jaathiye"	T. M. Soundararajan	02:02
"Oru Kinnathai"	T. M. Soundararajan, B. Vasantha	03:16
"Kudimagane"	T. M. Soundararajan, L. R. Eswari	03:17
"Kalaimagal Kai Porule"	P. Susheela	03:27
"Adiyamma Rajathi"	T. M. Soundararajan, P. Susheela	03:15
"Mayakkamenna"	T. M. Soundararajan, P. Susheela	03:30
"Irandu Manam"	T. M. Soundararajan	04:10
"Yaarukkaga"	T. M. Soundararajan	03:28

== Release and reception ==
Vasantha Maligai was released on 29 September 1972. Kanthan of Kalki praised Vanisri's performance, but criticised the screenplay. The film was one of the biggest successes for Ganesan, running for over 750 days in theatres. It held the record of running the highest continuous full-house showings in Madras. The film had 271 continuous full-house screenings in all the three theatres it was released, namely, Shanthi, Crown, and Bhuvaneswari. It was also successful in Sri Lanka where it ran for two years, becoming the first Indian Tamil film to achieve this feat. The film initially had Anand dying in the climax, but three days after its release it was changed into one where he survives.

== Re-releases ==
=== Theatrical ===
A digitally restored version of Vasantha Maligai was released on 8 March 2013. The restoration was done by P. Srinivasan of Sai Ganesh Films at a cost of ₹10 million (equivalent to ₹19 million or US$200,000 in 2023), consuming five months of work. M. Suganth of The Times of India rated the digital version 4.5 out of 5 stars saying, "To be frank, the opening 20 minutes are as choppy a ride as that experienced by the characters in the introductory scene." He continued, "But forget K V Mahadevan's songs, forget Krishnarao's dazzling sets and forget the leading man. This film still holds up so well – 40 years after its release – because of the writing and characterisation. Yes, for a film that is dismissed as melodramatic romance, the writing (Balamurugan) is quite nuanced." He concludes that the film is "further proof that old is indeed gold."

Another digitally restored version was released on 21 June 2019. The restoration on this version was done by Groupcom Systems who remastered it in DI colour, besides other technology upgrades such as DTS, 4K Sony and 2K Qube.

=== Home media ===
Vasantha Maligai is included alongside various other hit Sivaji Ganesan films in the compilation DVD 8 Ulaga Adhisayam Sivaji.

== In popular culture ==
In Kalyana Galatta (1998), Rajagopalan (Sathyaraj) does a spoof on song "Yaarukkaga" and imitates Anand's mannerisms. In En Purushan Kuzhandhai Maadhiri (2001), Angusaamy (Vadivelu) who is drunk will be seen singing "Kudimagane". In Manal Kayiru (1982), Kittumani (S. Ve. Shekher) sings "Yemandha Sonagiri" with his situation being similar to Anand. In Sivaji: The Boss (2007), the title character (Rajinikanth) and Tamizhselvi (Shriya Saran) imitate the song "Mayakkam Enna".
