= Kadiyala Venkateswara Rao =

Indian archaeologist

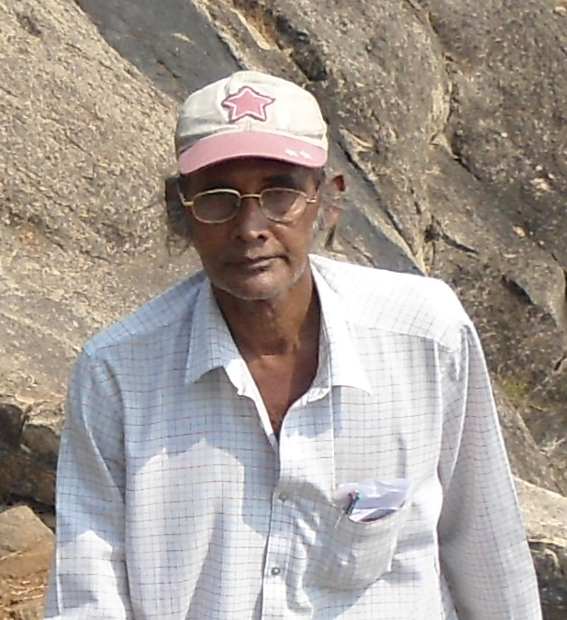
- Born: 7 April 1948; Guntur district, Andhra Pradesh, India
- Occupations: Retired Deputy Director in SAAP, archaeologist

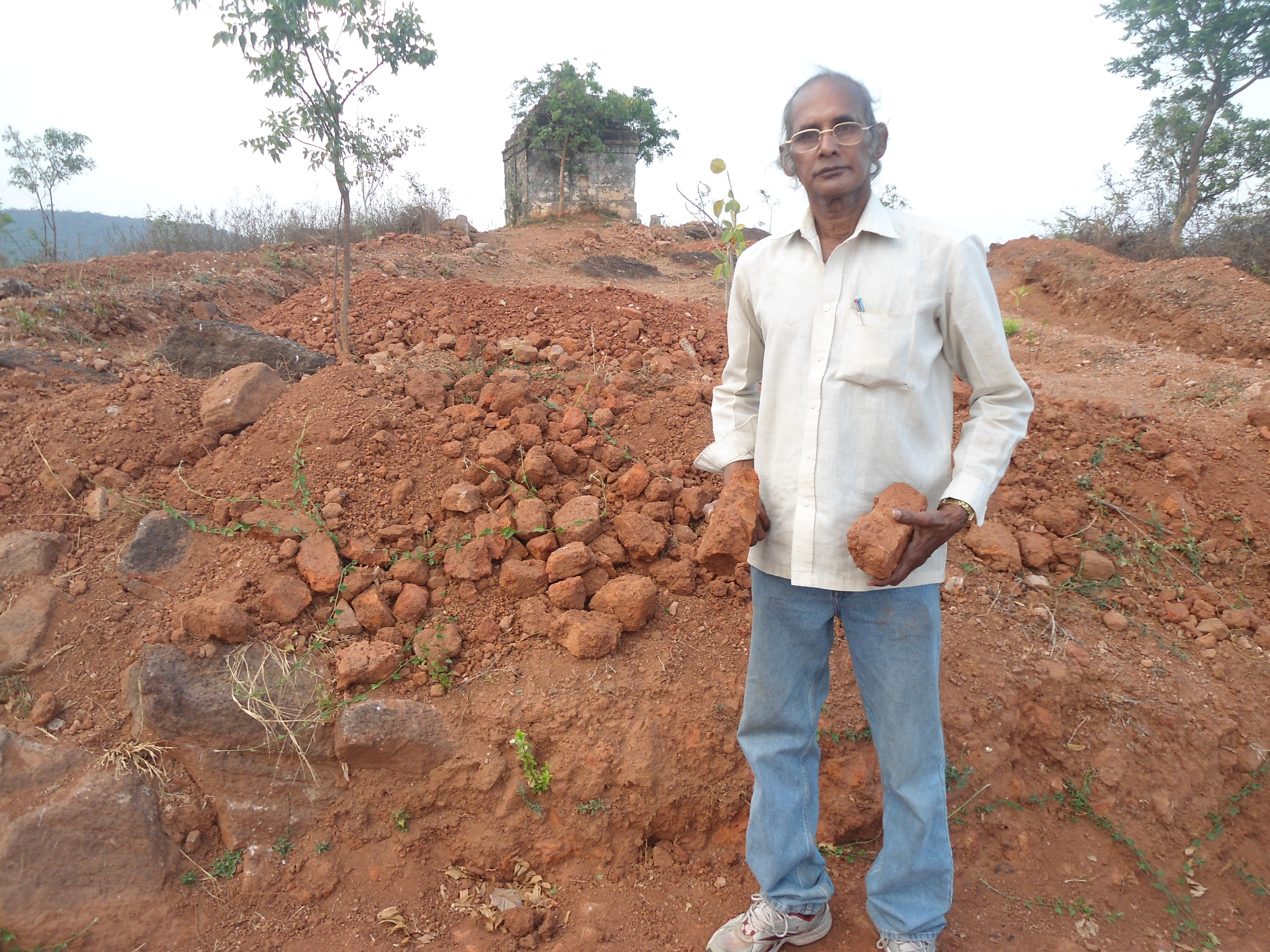
Kadiyala Venkateswara Rao at Saripalli buddhist site in Vizianagram district

Kadiyala Venkateswara Rao (born 7 April 1948) is a retired sports Deputy director in Sports Authority of Andhra Pradesh, a professional freelance-archaeologist. He hails from Tenali in Guntur district, Andhra Pradesh. He is credited with the exploration and identification of a large number of prehistoric and Buddhist sites in Andhra Pradesh in the recent years. (2010–2014)

== Discoveries & Explorations ==
- Buddhist and Prehistoric site at Mallepadu (near Tenali) in Guntur district.
- Buddhist site at Pondugula in Krishna district.
- Buddhist site at Parupaka in East Godavari district.
- Buddhist site at Ayyapparaju Kothapalli, Tondangi Mandal in East Godavari district.
- Prehistoric site at Tetagunta in East Godavari district.
- Prehistoric site at Sangamayyakonda near Amudalavalasa in Srikakulam district.
- Prehistoric site at Dannanapeta near Amudalavalasa in Srikakulam district
- Prehistoric site at Chittivalasa, Sailada Hills near Amudalavalasa in Srikakulam district.
