= Bangaru Babu (1973 film) =

- Theatrical release poster
- Directed by: V. B. Rajendra Prasad
- Written by: Acharya Aatreya (dialogues)
- Screenplay by: V. B. Rajendra Prasad
- Story by: V. B. Rajendra Prasad
- Produced by: V. B. Rajendra Prasad
- Starring: Akkineni Nageswara Rao; Vanisri
- Cinematography: S. Venkataratnam
- Edited by: A. Sanjeevi
- Music by: K. V. Mahadevan
- Production company: Jagapathi Art Pictures
- Release date: 15 March 1973
- Running time: 150 minutes
- Country: India
- Language: Telugu

Bangaru Babu (transl. Golden Guy) is a 1973 Indian Telugu-language romance film, produced and directed by V. B. Rajendra Prasad. It stars Akkineni Nageswara Rao and Vanisri, with music composed by K. V. Mahadevan. The film was a box office hit.

== Cast ==
- Akkineni Nageswara Rao as Buchi Babu
- Vanisri as Vani
- S. V. Ranga Rao as Raghavaiah
- Jaggayya as Dr. Ram Mohan
- Gummadi as Ranganatham
- Nagabhushanam as Jaganatham
- Ramana Reddy as Director
- Padmanabham as Producer Seshaiah
- Satyanarayana as himself
- Rajababu as Hanumanthu
- K. V. Chalam as Madhu
- Sakshi Ranga Rao as Seshaiah
- Sarathi as Manager
- Suryakantham as Savitri
- S. Varalakshmi as Vani's aunt
- Jayanthi as Chandra
- Ramaprabha as Manikyam
- Vijaya Bhanu as Bharathi

Special appearances

- Krishna
- Sobhan Babu
- Sivaji Ganesan
- Rajesh Khanna

== Soundtrack ==
Bangaru Babu

Film score by K. V. Mahadevan
- Released: 1973
- Genre: Soundtrack
- Length: 25:44
- Label: EMI Columbia Audio
- Producer: K. V. Mahadevan

K. V. Mahadevan chronology
Andala Ramudu (1973)	Bangaru Babu (1973)	Manchivadu (1973)

Music composed by K. V. Mahadevan. Lyrics were written by Acharya Aatreya.

No.	Title	Singer(s)	Length
1.	"Chengavi Rangu Cheera"	Ghantasala, P. Susheela	4:21
2.	"Gowramm Thalli"	P. Suseela	4:14
3.	"Edadugula Sambandham"	Ghantasala, P. Suseela	5:34
4.	"Emanukunnavu"	Ghantasala	3:55
5.	"Kannayyalanti Annayya"	Ghantasala, P. Suseela	3:42
6.	"Thagilindayyo Thagilindi"	P. Suseela	3:58
7.	"Sreerama Chandra Narayana"	Ghantasala, P. Suseela	4:16
