= Chilipi Krishnudu =

- Theatrical release poster
- Directed by: Boyina Subba Rao
- Written by: Acharya Aatreya (dialogues)
- Screenplay by: Boyina Subba Rao
- Story by: V. C. Guhanathan
- Produced by: D. Ramanaidu
- Starring: Akkineni Nageswara Rao; Vanisri
- Cinematography: A. Venkat
- Edited by: K. A. Marthand
- Music by: K. V. Mahadevan
- Production company: Suresh Productions
- Release date: 11 January 1978
- Running time: 162 minutes
- Country: India
- Language: Telugu

Chilipi Krishnudu is a 1978 Telugu-language romantic drama film produced by D. Ramanaidu under the Suresh Productions banner and directed by Boyina Subba Rao. It stars Akkineni Nageswara Rao, Vanisri and music composed by K. V. Mahadevan. The film was remade in Hindi in 1980 as Bandish.

== Cast ==
- Akkineni Nageswara Rao as Krishna
- Vanisri as Vani / Rani (Dual role)
- Satyanarayana as Krishna's father
- Gummadi as Principal
- Rao Gopal Rao as Narayana
- Prabhakar Reddy as Raja
- Raja Babu as Gopal
- Allu Ramalingaiah as Nagalingam
- K. V. Chalam as Vithal
- K. K. Sarma as Sheshaiah
- Ch. Krishna Murthy
- Chitti Babu
- Santha Kumari as Meenakshamma
- Suryakantam as Mrs. James
- Rama Prabha as Nagalingam 's daughter
- Radha Kumari as a villager
- Fatafat Jayalaxmi as Aasa
- Shubha as Lakshmi

== Soundtrack ==
Music composed by K. V. Mahadevan.

Song title	Lyrics	Singers	length
"Cheeralethukelada Chilipi Krishnudu"	Acharya Aatreya	S. P. Balasubrahmanyam, P. Susheela	4:10
Kaatuketti	"Veturi"	S. P. Balasubrahmanyam, P. Susheela	3:27
"Govinda Govinda"	Acharya Aatreya	S. P. Balasubrahmanyam, P. Susheela	4:04
"Ey Mogudu"	Veturi	S. P. Balasubrahmanyam, P. Susheela	5:32
"Nerchuko"	Acharya Aatreya	S. P. Balasubrahmanyam, P. Susheela	3:59
"Ellosthanoi"	Acharya Aatreya	P. Susheela	3:48
"Indhukenaa"	Acharya Aatreya	S. P. Balasubrahmanyam	3:50
