= Kannan En Kadhalan =

1968 film by P. Neelakantan

- Theatrical release poster
- Directed by: P. Neelakantan
- Screenplay by: R. M. Veerappan
- Story by: A. S. Prakasam
- Produced by: R. M. Veerappan
- Starring: M. G. Ramachandran; Jayalalithaa; Vanisri
- Cinematography: V. Ramamoorthy
- Edited by: C. P. Jambulingam
- Music by: M. S. Viswanathan
- Production company: Sathya Movies
- Release date: 26 April 1968
- Running time: 142 minutes
- Country: India
- Language: Tamil

Kannan En Kadhalan (transl. Kannan, my lover) is a 1968 Indian Tamil-language film, directed by P. Neelakantan, produced and co-written by R. M. Veerappan, starring M. G. Ramachandran, Jayalalithaa and Vanisri. It was released on 25 April 1968.

== Plot ==
Kannan is the adopted son of a retired Captain and Sundaram is the biological son. Mallika is the niece of this rich man, who is engaged, at birth to Sundaram. Mallika is secretly in love with Kannan. Malathi lost her father in an accident; she now lives with the widow as her adopted daughter. Malathi and Kannan fall in love as they share good bonding. Kannan and Sundaram aren't on good terms. Sundaram's behaviour towards Mallika and Malathi is not appropriates.Mallika died. Kannan married Malathi . The film ends.

== Cast ==
- M. G. Ramachandran as Kannan
- Jayalalithaa as Maliga
- Vanisri as Malathi
- R. Muthuraman as The engineer Sundaram
- S. A. Ashokan as Doctor Singh
- Cho Ramaswamy as Pathapi / Sabapathy
- Thengai Srinivasan as Sheshastri Iyer
- J. P. Chandrababu (Guest-Star) as Chandran
- O. A. K. Thevar as Singaram
- Loose Arumugam
- Usilaimani as The false astrologer
- Gandhimathi as Neelambigai Ammu
- Rama Prabha as Girija
- Ennathe Kannaiya as Kulasekaran
- Karikol Raju as Advocate
- Shanmugasundari as Shanmugapriya Malliga's aunt
- Trichy Soundararajan as The Captain Gopal, redeemed military officer
- Justin as a goon in the cabaret
- Vijaya Chandrika as Malathi's friend

== Soundtrack ==
The music was composed by M. S. Viswanathan. The song "Paaduvor Paadinaal" was composed using various Indian classical and western instruments, most notably the piano, and is a "jazz-meets-Indian folk redux".

Song	Singers	Lyrics	Length
Opening title music	M. S. Viswanathan	No lyrics	01:52 (instrumental)
Kannan on the piano, Mallika on the floor	M. S. Viswanathan	No lyrics	01.02 (instrumental)
"Kettikariyin Poyyum"	T. M. Soundararajan & P. Susheela	Alangudi Sômu	03:27 / 03:37 (film version)
"Paaduvor Paadinaal"	T. M. Soundararajan	Vaali	03:06 / 04:41 (film version)
Kannan, Malathi & action on music (part 1)	M. S. Viswanathan	No lyrics	02.42 (instrumental)
Kannan, Malathi & action on music (part 2)	M. S. Viswanathan	No lyrics	01:32 (instrumental)
"Kangal Irandum"	T. M. Soundararajan & P. Susheela	Vaali	03:07 / 03:37 (film version)
"Siriththaal Thangapadumai"	T. M. Soundararajan & P. Susheela	Alangudi Sômu	03:12 / 04:02 (film version)
"Minminiyei Kanmaniyai"	T. M. Soundararajan & L. R. Eswari	Vaali	03:57 / 03:54 (film version)
"Paaduvor Paadinaal" (reprise 1)	T. M. Soundararajan & Jayalalithaa (Dialogues)	Vaali	02:57 / 02:58 (film version)
"Paaduvor Paadinaal" (reprise 2)	T. M. Soundararajan & P. Susheela	Vaali	0:49 (film version)

== Release and reception ==
Kannan En Kadhalan was released on 25 April 1968. The Indian Express in its review dated 17 May 1968 wrote, "Director P. Neelakantan has made the film racy in tempo; there is not a moment of flagging interest". Kalki called the film as attractive as its title.
