= Punniya Boomi =

- Theatrical release poster
- Directed by: K. Vijayan
- Screenplay by: Sakthi T. K. Krishnasamy
- Story by: Mehboob Khan
- Produced by: N. V. Ramasamy
- Starring: Sivaji Ganesan; Vanisri
- Cinematography: Ishan Arya
- Edited by: R. Devarajan
- Music by: M. S. Viswanathan
- Production company: N.V.R. Pictures
- Release date: 12 May 1978
- Country: India
- Language: Tamil

Punniya Boomi (transl. Sacred land) is a 1978 Indian Tamil-language film, directed by K. Vijayan and written by Sakthi T. K. Krishnasamy. The film stars Sivaji Ganesan and Vanisri, with Sangeeta, Bhavani, M. N. Nambiar and V. K. Ramasamy in supporting roles. It is a remake of the 1957 Hindi film Mother India, which was previously remade in Telugu in 1971 as Bangaru Thalli. The film was released on 12 May 1978.

== Plot ==
Manickam and Lakshmi are married. Manickam is mild mannered and timid. They had borrowed a lot of money for the marriage which multiplies by the time they had two children. The lender aims to take over their lands as he did with the rest of the people who owe him money and the only thing standing in his way is Lakshmi's hard-working nature helping repay the interest on the loan. While Lakshmi's elder son is hard-working and timid, the younger son cannot bear to see the atrocities which slowly pushes him to the wrong side of law. At one time, as vengeance, he plans to kidnap and molest the lender's daughter and he is killed by his own mother showing how, in India, for a mother, it is more important that her son is good than alive.

== Cast ==
- Sivaji Ganesan as Manickam and Raju
- Vanisri as Lakshmi
- Rama Krishna as Ramu
- Sangeeta
- Y. Vijaya as Rani
- Bhavani
- M. N. Nambiar as Nagalingam
- V. K. Ramasamy as Paramasivam
- Manorama as Ponnammal
- C. K. Saraswathi

== Soundtrack ==
The music was composed by M. S. Viswanathan. All lyrics were written by Kannadasan.

Track listing
No.	Title	Length
1.	"Manjapattu Veppilai"
2.	"Manushan Ennavo"
3.	"Ninaivu Podhum"

== Reception ==
Free India called it "out and out a Vanisri film" but criticised Nambiar's performance, the editing and Vijayan's direction, saying the director "seems to have taken everything for granted".
