= Jeevana Jyothi (1975 film) =

- Theatrical release poster
- Directed by: K. Viswanath
- Written by: K. Rama Lakshmi
- Produced by: D. V. S. Raju
- Starring: Shobhan Babu; Vanisree; Kaikala Satyanarayana; Raja Babu; Ramaprabha; Shubha; Amol Palekar
- Cinematography: G. K. Ramu
- Edited by: Baburao
- Music by: K. V. Mahadevan
- Release date: 16 May 1975
- Country: India
- Language: Telugu

Jeevana Jyothi (Telugu: జీవన జ్యోతి) is a 1975 Telugu film directed by K. Viswanath. It stars Vanisri in a double role as mother and daughter. Sobhan Babu is the leading man. This film won major awards especially in Filmfare Awards South and also won two Nandi Awards. Viswanath later remade the film in Hindi as Sanjog (1985), with Jaya Prada and Jeetendra. The film was also remade in Kannada as Balina Jyothi (1996), with Vishnuvardhan. The film was screened at the Asian and African film Festival at Tashkent.

== Plot ==
Hyderabad-bred Vasu goes to a village, where he meets and falls in love with a village belle, Lakshmi. She also is attracted to him, and both get married. After their marriage, both go to live with Vasu's parents, brother Panduranga Rao, sister-in-law, Janaki, and her son, Sonu. Lakshmi gets close to Sonu, and starts to spend all her time with him. This raises some concerns with Janaki, which results in some acrimony. Tragically, Sonu dies, leaving Lakshmi devastated and depressed. She gets pregnant and gives birth to a baby girl, but cannot get Sonu out of her mind. Her depression gives way to insanity, as she keeps on seeing Sonu in every child, and as a result she is institutionalized. Vasu has taken to alcohol in a big way and drowns his sorrows and frustrations in a constant drunken stupor. As a result, his daughter is adopted by Janaki and his brother, without knowing who her real parents are. Years pass by, their daughter, Sobha, has grown up and is herself a mother of a baby boy, and is going to settle in the US. Before leaving, the entire family assembles to visit Lakshmi. They find her holding a piece of log, covered in a blanket, singing to it as if it where Sonu. It is here that Sobha finds out who her real parents are, and it is here that she will be called upon to make the ultimate sacrifice.

== Cast ==
- Shobhan Babu as Vasu
- Vanisree as Lakshmi/Sobha
- Kaikala Satyanarayana as Vasu's brother, Pandurangarao
- Raja Babu as Vasu's friend, Raju
- Ramaprabha as Raju's wife
- Shubha as Vasu's Sister-in-Law, Janaki
- Allu Rama Lingaiah as Vasu's father
- Nirmalamma as Vasu's mother
- Mallikarjuna Rao
- Amol Palekar

== Songs ==
- "Ekkada Ekkada Dakkunnano Cheppuko" -
- "Endukante Emi Cheppanu" -
- "Muddula Maa Baabu" -
- "Sinni O Sinni" -

== Awards ==
Filmfare Awards South

- Best Film - Telugu - D. V. S. Raju
- Best Director - Telugu - K. Viswanath
- Best Actor - Telugu - Shoban Babu
- Best Actress - Telugu - Vanisri

Nandi Awards - 1975

- Best Feature Film - Gold - D. V. S. Raju
- Best Story Writer - K. Rama Lakshmi

== Box office ==
The film ran for more than 100 days in 12 centres.
