= Krishnaveni (film) =

- Theatrical release poster
- Directed by: V. Madhusudhana Rao
- Written by: Anasuya Shankar
- Based on: Sharapanjara (Kannada)
- Produced by: U. V. Suryanarayana Raju
- Starring: Krishnam Raju; Vanisri
- Edited by: Marthand
- Music by: Vijaya Bhaskar
- Production company: Gopi Krishna Movies
- Distributed by: Narendra International
- Release date: 1974
- Country: India
- Language: Telugu

Krishnaveni is a 1974 Indian Telugu-language film directed by V. Madhusudhana Rao, starring Krishnam Raju and Vanisri, under the banner of Gopikrishna Movies. The film received critical acclaim and commercial success upon release. The movie was about a woman suffering from hysteria and the emotional trauma for her family. It is a remake of the Kannada hit film Sharapanjara (1971).

== Plot ==
The movie starts with the marriage of a young couple, Krishnaveni (Vanisri) and Krishnamraju, and continues with a happy family life with kids. The couple decides to go to a tourist place called [Srisailam]. Krishnaveni has subconscious bad memories of her childhood abuse and the place where she was molested. She starts having hallucinations, overwhelming fear and other symptoms of mental illness. She is sent to a mental hospital and treated by psychologists. After her return from hospital, she is not welcomed back by her family members, kids, neighbours or even her friends. Society is afraid of her disease. Evil people misuse this opportunity. Slight disagreements or arguments are also treated as a sign of her disease. She cannot regain the affection of her husband and kids. Her misfortunes continue until she becomes ill again. The movie ends on a sad note, but conveys a message about society's misconceptions about mental illness.

== Cast ==
- Krishnam Raju as Satyanarayana Murty
- Vanisri as Krishnaveni
- Gummadi as Krishnaveni's father
- Anjali Devi as Krishaveni's mother
- M. Balaiah
- Pandari Bai as Satyanarayana's elder sister
- Raja Babu as Bheemanna
- Rama Prabha as Kamakshi
- Nirmalamma as Sundaramna
- Manju Bhargavi as Leela

== Soundtrack ==
The soundtrack features 5 songs.

- "Krishnaveni, Teluginti viriboni, Krishnaveni, Naa inti aliveni" - Lyrics written by C. Narayana Reddy. Sung by P. Susheela and V. Ramakrishna.
- "Sreesaila Mallayya" - Lyrics written by C. Narayana Reddy. Sung by P. Susheela.
- "Sangeetam madhurasangeetam" - Sung by P. Susheela.
- "Padunalegellu vanavamegi marali vacchenu Sita, Parama pavani aa maatha" - P. Susheela
- "Enduko nuvvu naato unna vela inta hayi" - P. Susheela, V. Ramakrishna.

== Awards ==
Filmfare Award for Best Actress - Telugu - Vanisri
