= Kondura =

1978 film by Shyam Benegal

Kondura (Hindi) Anugraham (Telugu)
- Directed by: Shyam Benegal
- Written by: Arudra (dialogues)
- Screenplay by: Shyam Benegal; Girish Karnad
- Story by: Chintamani T. Khanolkar
- Based on: Marathi novel Kondura by Chintamani T. Khanolkar
- Produced by: K. Venkat Rama Reddy; U Varadha Reddy
- Starring: Ananth Nag; Vanisri; Smita Patil; Amrish Puri; Rao Gopal Rao; Satyadev Dubey; Venu
- Cinematography: Govind Nihalani
- Music by: Vanraj Bhatia
- Release date: 1978
- Running time: 137 min
- Country: India
- Languages: Hindi; Telugu

Kondura / Anugraham is a 1978 Indian bilingual film directed by Shyam Benegal simultaneously in Hindi and Telugu. The film is based on the novel of the same name by Marathi writer, Chintamani T. Khanolkar, the screen adaptation was made by Shyam Benegal and Girish Karnad. The majority of the cast was common to both films and included Ananth Nag, Vanisri, Amrish Puri, Shekhar Chatterjee (Hindi version only), Rao Gopal Rao (Telugu version only) and Satyadev Dubey. The film was one of the Indian entries at the 4th Hong Kong International Film Festival.

== Overview ==
The film involves the life of a young man who comes to believe that he has been bestowed supernatural powers. As the story unfolds, this boon eventually leads to a tragedy.

Kondura is a story whose protagonist is a young Brahmin named Parshuram. He is married to Ansooya, but is dependent partially on his brother for a living. This makes the elder brother chide him often and that drives him away from home. However, as he is leaving "Kondura", the mythical sage from the sea appears and anoints him the guardian of village, to cure it of all sins. The sage also grants him a physical boon, which is a dried herb. The boon works if he remains celibate. Parshuram returns home to celibacy. Often, the goddess of the village, grants him appearance in person, speaking to him through his wife (a phenomenon still seen in Indian villages, where a person is believed to have sudden visitation by God or Goddess, who speaks to people through the person).

The goddess instructs him to get the village rid of evils, which he interprets as rebuilding the parts of the temple. For this, he enlists financial support from the village landlord who is otherwise a tyrant and womaniser. It is known that Bhairavmoorthy takes in any woman in the village who catches his eye, including his younger brother's wife, both of whom die leaving behind a physically challenged son Venu to an otherwise heirless fiefdom. It is rumoured that Vasu is his son, but Bhairavmoorthy mistreats him all the time. He marries him off to young and beautiful Parvati, who comes from a very poor family. Bhairavmoorthy is said to be eyeing Parvati too, but Parvati is stronger than rest of the women in the family and challenges his might at occasions.

Meanwhile, as the news of Kondura's boon and visitations by the Goddess coupled with constructions at the temple spreads, Parshuram becomes a revered Guru with a decent following of his own in the village. Followers see him as a counselor and a person with charisma.

There are celebrations at the landlord's house. Parvati is expecting a child. The Landlord's wife Kanthama is busy doing all the ceremonies. The gossip in the village is that the baby belongs to Bhairavmoorthy. The Goddess makes a visitation to Parshuram through Ansooya, and speaks of the "root" or "seed" of evil, mentioning Bhairavamoorthy's name. In this context, it is relevant to mention a short interlude that abruptly appears repeatedly through the narrative: The short dream-like sequence features Parvati lying in bed and beckoning the camera to come to her - Conceivably this is the director's hint at a troubling thread in Parshuram's mind, that even "chosen" ones have weaknesses to overcome. It is perhaps due to such a bias, Parshuram interprets the words of the Goddess as concerning the baby, the "root" of Bhairavamoorthy's evil. To make things worse, the landlord makes Parshuram believe that the baby is his, and Parshuram makes Parvati drink Kondura's herb that aborts the baby.

Once the sin is committed, the landlord makes the revelation that how he conned Parshuram into believing that the baby was his, which in reality was his nephew's, and that he could not bear the thought that his crippled nephew sires one and not him.

Gripped with immense guilt, Parshuram takes a radical path of atonement. He tries to invoke the Goddess by praying to his wife, Ansooya; but, when that effort fails, he decides to repent for his sin by forsaking his celibacy. While Ansooya resists the temptation, Parshurama forces her to succumb to it. Shocked by the action and her loss of purity, Ansooya commits suicide by jumping in a dry well. Parshooram wakes up searching for Ansooya and upon finding her dead body, he runs widely screaming her name.

Through the story, there is one character, Ramanayye Master, the village teacher, who does not blindly accept Parshuram's actions as Divinely sanctioned. He is seen questioning Parshuram, once even scolding him. The last shot of the film shows the teacher nodding helplessly. While intellectuals may interpret the movie as a statement against faith itself, the story actually does not deny Divinity or its manifestations; for instance, at no point are Anasooya's visitations hinted at being fake; indeed, much good did come out of the Goddess's instructions to Parshuram, as long as his self-interest did not cloud his interpretation of those instructions. More than likely, the story's ending is a nuanced take on sincere seekers, that even those with Divine experiences are not exempt from vigilance.

== Cast ==
- Ananth Nag as Parashuram
- Vanisri as Ansooya, Parashuram's Wife
- Smita Patil as Parvati
- Venu as Vasu
- Satyadev Dubey as Ramanayye Master
- Amrish Puri as Kondura /AppikondaSwami
- Shekhar Chatterjee as Bhairavamoorthy (Hindi version)
- Rao Gopal Rao as Bhairavamoorthy (Telugu version)
- Sulabha Deshpande as Kanthamma
