= Kulama Gunama =

1971 film by K. S. Gopalakrishnan

- Poster
- Directed by: K. S. Gopalakrishnan
- Screenplay by: K. S. Gopalakrishnan
- Story by: M. Aazam
- Produced by: M. Aazam
- Starring: Sivaji Ganesan; Jaishankar; Padmini; Vanisri
- Cinematography: R. Sampath
- Edited by: R. Devarajan
- Music by: K. V. Mahadevan
- Production company: Aazam Arts
- Release date: 26 March 1971
- Running time: 128 minutes
- Country: India
- Language: Tamil

Kulama Gunama (transl. Caste or Character?) is a 1971 Indian Tamil-language drama film, directed by K. S. Gopalakrishnan and produced by M. Aazam. The film stars Sivaji Ganesan, Jaishankar, Padmini and Vanisri. It is a remake of the 1968 Telugu film Thalli Prema. The film was released on 26 March 1971.

== Plot ==
Chinnathambi is a highly respectable man in his village. He works tirelessly for the welfare of his society and hardly spends time with his wife Seetha. Seetha has no child after many years of marriage. Raja is Chinnathambi's younger brother and is in love with Lalitha, daughter of Nambiar, who is the owner of a grocery store. Nambiar adulterates almost all his products in his shop and sells them at high prices. People have no choice but to buy his stuff for their daily life as this is the only grocery shop in the entire village. Chinnathambi puts a stop to this by inaugurating a grocery shop owned by the village cooperative society, after which Nambiar begins to incur losses as people no longer buy from his shop. After knowing that his daughter is in love with Chinnathambi's brother, Nambiar plans to make use of this to separate the brothers. Chinnathambi is initially reluctant to this marriage, but agrees eventually after talking to Lalitha and learning about her good character. After their marriage, Seetha and Lalitha lead the family like non-biological sisters. Lalitha pays no heed to her parents who wanted a separate share for Raja and herself. Their motive goes in vain. Both Seetha and Lalitha conceive at the same time and during the child birth, ironically, Lalitha's baby is stillborn. Unknown to Lalitha, Seetha gives her son to her. Nambiar persuades Raja to ask for his family share and Chinnathambi is shocked to hear this. Chinnathambi, in an emotional climax, gives his brother 2 choices, either to choose him or his entire family wealth in a subtle way. In the end, it is revealed that Lalitha knows the fact that her son is indeed Seetha's and they all live together happily.

== Cast ==
- Sivaji Ganesan as Chinnathambi
- Jaishankar as Raja
- Padmini as Seetha
- Vanisri as Lalitha
- M. N. Nambiar as Nallakannu
- C. K. Saraswathi as Sengamalam
- Nagesh as Kalimann
- K. D. Santhanam as Village Head
- G. Sakunthala as Doctor
- A. K. Veerasamy as Villager
- K. V. Srinivasan as Villager
- P. R. Varalakshmi as Dancer

== Soundtrack ==
The music was composed by K. V. Mahadevan, with lyrics by Kannadasan.

Song	Singers
"Sorgathil Mayangum"	T. M. Soundararajan, P. Susheela
"Ulagil Irandu Kiligal"	S. P. Balasubrahmanyam, S. Janaki, T. M. Soundararajan, P. Susheela
"Pillai Kali Theera"	P. Susheela, 'Soolamangalam' Rajalakshmi
"Maathuru Ramakka"	P. Susheela, S. Janaki
