= Ganga Manga =

1973 Telugu film directed by Tapi Chanakya

- Poster
- Directed by: Tapi Chanakya
- Written by: D. V. Narasa Raju (dialogues)
- Story by: Salim–Javed
- Produced by: B. Nagi Reddy; Aluri Chakrapani
- Starring: Vanisri; Krishna; Sobhan Babu
- Music by: Ramesh Naidu
- Production company: Vijaya Productions
- Release date: 30 November 1973
- Country: India
- Language: Telugu

Ganga Manga is a 1973 Indian Telugu-language comedy drama film in which Vanisri played a dual role as Ganga and Manga. Krishna and Sobhan Babu played the lead roles. The film was a remake of the Hindi film Seeta Aur Geeta.

== Plot ==
Ganga, who lost her parents when she was a child, is the rightful heir to a huge property. She has grown up to be a shy and innocent girl who lives with her uncle and aunt. Every month their family lawyer comes to their home and hands over some money to Ganga. But Durga forcefully takes it from her and harasses her by burdening her with the household work. Durga's brother Bujji always has an eye on Ganga. Ganga's uncle tries to set up a marriage with Ravi, who returns from a foreign country after completing his medicine. Durga dresses up Ganga in modern clothes by force so that Ravi's family dislikes her. As a result, they return unhappy. Ganga's grandmother explains to them what had happened, but they do not listen.

Manga is a happy-go-lucky girl who makes a living with her street magic along with Koti. They live with Manga's mother in a small hut.

Once Bujji tries to molest Ganga. When her grandmother tries stop it, he alleges that she tried to steal his purse, and beats her severely. In the struggle, her grandmother is injured. She flees from the house unable to bear the torture. Ganapati and Durga complain to the police about her. Meanwhile, Manga goes to the police station a different case. The police inspector mistakes Manga for Ganga, and calls Ganapati to take her back. They take Manga to their home.

Meanwhile, Ganga feels deserted and tries to kill herself by jumping into a river. Koti rescues her thinking that she is Manga and takes her to their house. Though Ganga explains that she is not Manga, they thought that she might have lost her mind because of the suicidal attempt. Once Ravi runs into Manga, and falls in love with her thinking that she is Ganga. He also explains to his parents about what had happened when they went to see her for marriage proposal. Ravi's family agrees to his marriage with Manga. He informs the same with Ganapati. He is also happy that she is to marry a good guy. Manga feels sad about Ganga's grandmother, and vows to take revenge on the people who caused them trouble. Manga keeps everybody in control.

Koti is addicted to liquor because he was rejected by Manga earlier. Manga's mother told this to Ganga and tries to be nice with him. Koti stops drinking. Arrangements are made such that Koti marries Ganga and Ravi marries Manga. But Bujji finds out that Ganga and Manga swapped their places and kidnaps Ganga. He also alleges that Manga killed Ganga. Manga had to surrender to police for the lack of evidence. Manga's mother reveals that Ganga and Manga are actually twins. She had separated her from their family. Koti and Ravi join hands to rescue Ganga and prove that Manga is innocent.

== Cast ==
- Vanisri as Ganga and Manga
- Relangi as Ganapati, Ganga's uncle
- Suryakantham as Durga, Ganga's aunt
- Krishna as Koti
- Sobhan Babu as Ravi
- Chandra Mohan as Bujji, brother of Durga
- Mikkilineni as Prasad, Family Lawyer
- Y. Vijaya as Leela, daughter of Durga
- G. Varalakshmi as Ganga's grandmother
- Padmanabham as The man whose car rams into Ravi's car
- Rama Prabha as Honey
- Dhulipala as Ravi's father

== Soundtrack ==
The music was composed by Ramesh Naidu.

All lyrics are written by Daasarathi.

Track listing
No.	Title	Singer(s)	Length
1.	"Gaalilo Paira Gaalilo"	V. Ramakrishna, P. Susheela	4:20
2.	"Tholi Valapulalo"	Ghantasala, P. Susheela	3:50
3.	"Husharu Kavalante"	S. P. Balasubrahmanyam	3:54
4.	"Gadasani Dorasani"	S. P. Balasubrahmanyam, P. Susheela	4:46
5.	"Ala Ala Ala"	S. P. Balasubrahmanyam, P. Susheela	3:38
6.	"Thaganu Nenu Thaganu"	P. Susheela	3:09
Total length:			23:37
