= Inturi Venkateswara Rao =

Dr.Inturi Venkateswara Rao
- Born: Inturi Venkateswara Rao; 1 July 1909; Chandrarajupalem, Sattenapalli, Guntur district
- Died: 7 May 2002 (aged 92); Chennai
- Citizenship: India
- Writing career
- Pen name: Dr Inturi
- Genres: Writer, Director
- Notable work: Kummari Molla

Inturi Venkateswara Rao (Telugu: ఇంటూరి వెంకటేశ్వరరావు), known as Inturi (1 July 1909 – 2002) was an Indian freedom fighter, Trade unionist, writer and film journalist.

== Brief lifesketch ==
Inturi was born at Chandrarajupalem near Sattenapalli in Guntur district in 1909. His parents are Narasimham Pantulu and Laxmikantamma. After primary education at Tenali, he was attracted by Mahatma Gandhi and participated in the Non-cooperation movement in 1921. He was sentenced to three and half years jail term in 1930 for his participation in Salt Satyagraha. He joined the Socialist Party and was associated with Jayaprakash Narayan.

Inturi was also a correspondent with The Bombay Chronicle. He has joined the film industry in 1936 and worked with Gudavalli Ramabrahmam, Tripuraneni Gopichand and P. Kannamba as an associate director. He has founded "Cinema" a fortnightly film magazine and ran it for 19 years. He has founded the Madras Cine Workers Union and the Andhra Film Journalists Association in 1945. It was the first such associations in the South India.

He had written the life story of Atukuri Molla under the title Kummara Molla and published in 1969. Another writer Sunkara Satyanarayana wrote a ballad based on this novel, which became very popular and has been sung all over Andhra Pradesh. The story has been made into a movie in 1971 by B. Padmanabham under the title Kathanayika Molla. He has also published a book on Tarikonda Venkamamba.

Screen magazine published his biography and described him as "A Man of Million Ideas".

He died in 2002. Dr. Inturi Memorial Trust was established in his memory and gives Dr. Inturi Venkateswara Rao Visishta Puraskarams annually to the noted film journalists. The recipients of this Award include Rentala Jayadeva, Randor Guy, S. P. Balasubrahmanyam, P. Susheela and Inampudi Arjuna Rao.

== Awards ==
- Andhra University awarded him the Kalaprapoorna in 1985.
- The Prestigious Ramnoth award of the Cine Technicians Association of South India in 1985.
- The Siromani award by the American Telugu Association in 1992
- He was awarded the Raghupathi Venkaiah Award for his lifetime achievement by Government of Andhra Pradesh in 1996.
