= Manchivadu =

- Theatrical release poster
- Directed by: V. Madhusudhana Rao
- Written by: Acharya Aatreya (dialogues)
- Screenplay by: V. Madhusudhana Rao
- Story by: P. Krishnan
- Based on: Baalu Belagithu (1970)
- Produced by: T. Govindarajan
- Starring: Akkineni Nageswara Rao; Vanisri; Kanchana
- Cinematography: P. S. Selvaraj
- Edited by: K. Satyam
- Music by: K. V. Mahadevan
- Production company: Venus Combines
- Release date: 21 February 1974
- Running time: 145 mins
- Country: India
- Language: Telugu

Manchivadu (transl. Good man) is a 1974 India Telugu-language drama film, produced by T. Govindarajan under the Venus Combines banner and directed by V. Madhusudhana Rao. It stars Akkineni Nageswara Rao, Vanisri and Kanchana, with music composed by K. V. Mahadevan. The film is a remake of the Kannada movie Baalu Belagithu (1970).

== Cast ==
- Akkineni Nageswara Rao as Anand and Satyam (dual role)
- Vanisri as Chandra
- Kanchana as Lalitha
- Satyanarayana as Raju
- Raja Babu as Chakram
- Padmanabham as Bangaram Seth
- Mada as Hotel Manager
- Balakrishna
- Rama Prabha as Sakhubhai
- Halam as item number
- Baby Sumathi as Rani

== Crew ==
- Art: S. Krishna Rao
- Choreography: Heeralal, Sundaram
- Dialogues: Acharya Aatreya
- Lyrics: C. Narayana Reddy, Acharya Aatreya, Dasaradhi
- Playback: Ghantasala, P. Susheela, M. Rama Rao
- Music: K. V. Mahadevan
- Story: P. Krishnan
- Editing: K. Satyam
- Cinematography: P. S. Selvaraj
- Producer: T. Govindarajan
- Screenplay - Director: V. Madhusudhana Rao
- Banner: Venus Combines
- Release Date: 21 February 1974

== Soundtrack ==
Manchivadu

Film score by K. V. Mahadevan
- Released: 1974
- Genre: Soundtrack
- Length: 23:56
- Producer: K. V. Mahadevan

K. V. Mahadevan chronology
Bangaru Babu (1973)	Manchivadu (1974)	Mayadari Malligadu (1973)

Music composed by K. V. Mahadevan. Music released on Audio Company.

No.	Title	Lyrics	Singer(s)	Length
1.	"Aakalundadhu"	Acharya Aatreya	Ghantasala, P. Susheela	4:04
2.	"Ammaaye Puduthundhi"	Acharya Aatreya	Ghantasala, P. Susheela	3:31
3.	"Ee Reyi Kavvinchindhi"	Dasaradhi	Ghantasala, P. Susheela	4:39
4.	"Mapatikosthaava"	C. Narayana Reddy	P. Susheela	3:33
5.	"Choosthaa Baagaa Choosthaa"	Acharya Aatreya	M. Rama Rao	3:42
6.	"Chitti Papalu"	Acharya Aatreya	Ghantasala	1:24
7.	"Abbaaye Puttaadu"	Acharya Aatreya	P. Susheela	3:03
8.	"Pettiputtinadanavamma"	Acharya Aatreya	Ghantasala	3:57
