= Mangamma Sapatham (1965 film) =

Mangamma Sapadham
- Theatrical release poster
- Directed by: B. Vittalacharya
- Written by: Samudrala Jr. (dialogues)
- Screenplay by: B. Vittalacharya
- Produced by: D. V. S. Raju
- Starring: N. T. Rama Rao; Jamuna
- Cinematography: R. Sampath
- Edited by: G. D. Joshi
- Music by: T. V. Raju
- Production company: D. V. S. Productions
- Release date: 6 March 1965
- Running time: 176 minutes
- Country: India
- Language: Telugu

Mangamma Sapadham (transl. Mangamma's vow) is a 1965 Indian Telugu-language film, produced by D. V. S. Raju under the D. V. S. Productions banner and directed by B. Vittalacharya. It stars N. T. Rama Rao and Jamuna, with music composed by T. V. Raju. The film is a remake of the 1943 Tamil film of the same name.

== Cast ==
- N. T. Rama Rao as Raja & Vijay (dual role)
- Jamuna as Mangamma
- Rajanala as Sainyadhipathi
- Relangi as Bhaja Govindam
- Ramana Reddy as Kotvalu
- Allu Ramalingaiah as Rathalu
- Mikkilineni as Narasaiah
- Balakrishna as Joogulu
- L. Vijayalakshmi as Vijaya
- Vanisri as Chenchela
- Rajashree as Dancer
- Girija as Manjeera
- Chayadevi as Seeta

== Soundtrack ==
Music composed by T. V. Raju.

| Song title | Lyrics | Singers | length |
|---|---|---|---|
| "Rivvunasage" | C. Narayana Reddy | P. Susheela | 4:50 |
| "Dheedikku" | C. Narayana Reddy | Jikki, S. Janaki | 3:05 |
| "Kanuleevela" | C. Narayana Reddy | Ghantasala, P. Susheela | 2:59 |
| "Ayyayya Aeisapaisa" | Kosaraju | P. Susheela | 4:03 |
| "Neerajupilichenu" | C. Narayana Reddy | Ghantasala, P. Susheela | 3:33 |
| "Aavooru Needikadu" | Kosaraju | Madhavapeddi Satyam, Swarnalatha | 3:13 |
| "Chirunavvulurinchu" | Kosaraju | P. Susheela, Swanalatha | 3:59 |
| "Vayyara Molide Chinnadi" | C. Narayana Reddy | Ghantasala, P. Susheela | 2:58 |
| "Andalanaraja" | C. Narayana Reddy | P. Susheela | 3:34 |
