= Prema Nagar =

- Theatrical release poster
- Directed by: K. S. Prakash Rao
- Written by: Acharya Aatreya
- Story by: Koduri Kausalya Devi
- Based on: Prema Nagar (novel) by Koduri Kausalya Devi
- Produced by: D. Ramanaidu
- Starring: Akkineni Nageswara Rao; Vanisree
- Cinematography: S. Venkataratnam
- Edited by: K. A. Marthand
- Music by: K. V. Mahadevan
- Production company: Suresh Productions
- Distributed by: Navayuga Films
- Release date: 24 September 1971
- Running time: 170 minutes
- Country: India
- Language: Telugu

Prema Nagar (transl. Abode of Love) is a 1971 Indian Telugu-language romance film directed by K. S. Prakash Rao and produced by D. Ramanaidu under the Suresh Productions banner. It stars Akkineni Nageswara Rao and Vanisri with music composed by K. V. Mahadevan. The film is based on a novel of the same name by Koduri Kausalya Devi.

Prema Nagar was a blockbuster, grossing ₹1.45 crores at the box office. D. Ramanaidu, who was in financial troubles after the failure of an earlier film, experienced a dramatic turnaround in his career with the stupendous success of Prema Nagar. The film had a theatrical run of over 750 days. It was remade in Tamil as Vasantha Maligai (1972) and in Hindi as Prem Nagar (1974) both directed by Prakash Rao.

== Cast ==
- Akkineni Nageswara Rao as Kalyan
- Vanisri as Lata
- S. V. Ranga Rao as Kalyan's father
- Gummadi as Latha's father
- Satyanarayana as Kesava Varma
- Raja Babu as Dasu
- V. Nagayya as Doctor
- Dhulipala as Diwanji
- Ramana Reddy
- K. V. Chalam as Cook
- Raavi Kondala Rao as School Teacher
- Sakshi Ranga Rao as Priest
- Kakarala as Latha's brother
- Santha Kumari as Kalyan's mother
- Hemalatha as Latha's mother
- Suryakantham
- S. Varalakshmi as Indrani
- Rama Prabha as Hamsa
- Jyothi Lakshmi as item number
- Chalapathi Rao as doctor
- Pushpalatha as Ayya
- Pushpa Kumari as Gowri
- Meena Kumari as Kamala
- Master Venkatesh as Young Kesava Varma

== Production ==
The film is based on the novel of the same name written by Koduri Kausalya Devi. K. S. Prakash Rao scripted the film with dialogue given by Acharya Aatreya. K. A. Marthand performed the editing while S. Venkataratnam handled the cinematography. S. Krishna Rao is the Art Director.

== Soundtrack ==
Prema Nagar

Film score by K. V. Mahadevan
- Released: 1971
- Genre: Soundtrack
- Length: 43:55
- Label: Saregama
- Producer: K. V. Mahadevan

K. V. Mahadevan chronology
Dasara Bullodu (1971)	Prema Nagar (1971)	Sampoorna Ramayanam (1971)

Music composed by K. V. Mahadevan. Lyrics were written by Acharya Aatreya. The song "Le Le Naa Raja" was remixed in the film Xtra (2004).

Songs
No.	Title	Playback	Length
1.	"Neekosam Velasindi"	Ghantasala & P. Susheela	4:44
2.	"Le Le Le Naa Raja"	Ghantasala & L. R. Eswari	4:23
3.	"Nenu Puttanu"	Ghantasala	4:30
4.	"Theta Theta Telugula"	Ghantasala	3:32
5.	"Vunte Ee Voollo Undu"	P. Susheela	3:55
6.	"Kalavani"	P. Susheela	4:47
7.	"Kadaveththu Kochchindhi"	Ghantasala & P. Susheela	4:32
8.	"Manasu Gaathi Inthey"	Ghantasala	4:07
9.	"Yevaro Raavaali"	P. Susheela	4:21
10.	"Anthamuleni"	Ghantasala	1:26
11.	"Evarikosam"	Ghantasala	3:32
Total length:			43:55
