= Oorukku Uzhaippavan =

1976 film by M. Krishnan Nair

- Theatrical release poster
- Directed by: M. Krishnan Nair
- Screenplay by: Poovai Krishan
- Produced by: S. Krishnamoorthy; T. Govindarajan
- Starring: M. G. Ramachandran; Vanisri; Vennira Aadai Nirmala
- Cinematography: N. Balakrishnan
- Edited by: Krishnan-Sundharam
- Music by: M. S. Viswanathan
- Production company: Venus Pictures
- Release date: 12 November 1976
- Running time: 146 minutes
- Country: India
- Language: Tamil

Oorukku Uzhaippavan (transl. Worker for the country) is a 1976 Indian Tamil-language film written and directed by M. Krishnan Nair, starring M. G. Ramachandran, Vanisri and Vennira Aadai Nirmala. It is a remake of the 1970 Kannada film Baalu Belagithu. The film was released on 12 November 1976.

== Plot ==
Selvam, an undercover policeman, takes the place of a rich industrialist, Raja. The operation is facilitated because both men look alike. A gang rages in the region and swindles the wealthy citizens like Raja. Selvam 's mission is to neutralise this group. The infiltrated policeman is going to find himself in the centre of a huge problems that Raja faces both on the personal and professional front while Selvam's absence also causes trouble for his own personal life.

How Selvam manages to solve Raja's problems while capturing the gang at the cost of his own personal life is the rest of the story as he lives up to the title, someone who works for welfare of others.

== Cast ==
- M. G. Ramachandran as Selvam and Raja
- Vanisri as Maliga
- Vennira Aadai Nirmala as Kanchana
- M. N. Rajam as Maliga's mother
- Kumari Padmini as Kumudha and Rita, alias Radha
- Baby Rajkumari as Rani, Raja's daughter
- Thengai Srinivasan as Panduragan James Bond, Selvam's assistant
- V. Gopalakrishnan as Police inspector
- P. S. Veerappa as Nagappan
- K. Kannan as Raja Velu, Maliga's father
- M. B. Shetty as a hired man
- Shanmugasundari as Slum people
- Karikol Raju

== Production ==
Oorukku Uzhaippavan was shot in Karnataka in places such as Mysore and Bangalore.

== Soundtrack ==
The music was composed by M. S. Viswanathan.

No.	Title	Lyrics	Singer(s)	Length
1.	"Idhuthan Mudhal Rathiri"	Vaali	K. J. Yesudas, Vani Jairam	4:27
2.	"Iravu Padagan Oruvan"	Na. Kamarasan	K. J. Yesudas	2:13
3.	"It's Easy To Fool You"	Vaali, Randor Guy (English lyrics)	S. P. Balasubrahmanyam, Usha Uthup	5:21
4.	"Iravu Padagan Oruvan" (reprise)	Na. Kamarasan	K. J. Yesudas	2:13
5.	"Azhagennum Oviyam"	Muthulingam	K. J. Yesudas, P. Susheela	3:02
6.	"Iravu Padagan Oruvan" (reprise)	Na. Kamarasan	K. J. Yesudas, Vanisri (dialogues)	2:13
7.	"Iravu Padagan Oruvan" (instrumental)	—	—	2:13
8.	"Pillai Thamizh Paadugiren"	Muthulingam	K. J. Yesudas	3:29

== Reception ==
Kanthan of Kalki praised the cast, songs and cinematography.
