= Vanisri =

Indian actress

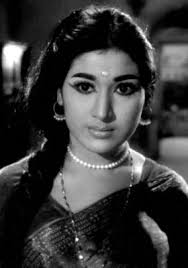
- Born: Rathna Kumari; Nellore, Madras State, India
- Occupations: Actress; politician
- Years active: 1964–1981; 1988–2004
- Works: Full list
- Spouse: Dr. Karunakaran (m. 1978)
- Awards: Filmfare Awards; Nandi Award

Vanisri (born Rathna Kumari) is an Indian actress known for her works predominantly in Telugu, Tamil, and Kannada films. In a film career spanning 40 years, she has received three Filmfare Awards South, the Nandi Awards and the Tamil Nadu State Film Award.

== Career ==
Vani made her debut with the 1962 Telugu movie Bhishma. She gained attention with a supporting role in a film penned by K. Balachander titled Sukha Dukhalu, and Marapurani Katha (1967). Vanisri has starred in super hits such as Krishnaveni, Prem Nagar, Dussehra Bullodu, Aradhana, Jeevitha Chakram, Rangula Ratnam, Sri Krishna Tulabharam, Bhakta Kannappa, and Bobbili Raja.

She played dual roles in Iddaru Ammayilu (1972) (Telugu remake of 1969 Kannada film Kappu Bilupu), Ganga Manga (1973 remake of the Hindi film Seeta Aur Geeta), Jeevana Jyothi (1975), and Chilipi Krishnudu (1978). She financed and starred in Shyam Benegal's only Telugu film Anugraham (1977), co-starring Smita Patil.

With actor M. G. R Vanisri acted in three films: Kannan En Kadhalan (1968), Thalaivan (1970), and Oorukku Uzhaippavan (1976).

She acted in 20 Telugu films with Akkineni Nageshwara Rao and 18 Telugu films with Super Star Krishna such as Marapurani Katha, Ganga Manga, Cheekati velugulu, Illu Illalu. She acted with Sivaji Ganesan in 10 films such as Uyarntha Manithan (1968), Nirai Kudam (1969), Kulama Gunama (1971), Vasantha Maligai (1972), Sivakamiyin Selvan (1974), Vani Rani (Tamil remake of the Hindi film Seeta Aur Geeta) (1974), Rojavin Raja (1976), Ilaya Thalaimurai (1977), Punniya Boomi (1978), and Nallathoru Kudumbam (1979). In 2013, she received the state Raghupathi Venkaiah Award for her contribution to Telugu cinema.

== Personal life ==
Vanisri married Dr. Karunkaran in 1978 and left the film industry. The couple became parents to a son and a daughter. Vanisri returned to acting in mother roles from 1989, such as her character in Athaku Yamudu Ammayiki Mogudu (1989). She was appeared in the 1999 Hindi film Main Tere Pyar Mein Pagal, by famous Telugu director K. Raghavendra Rao.

She lost her son Abhinaya Venkatesha Karthik aged 36 on 23 May 2020 to cardiac arrest.

== Awards and honours ==
Year	Award	Award category	Awarded work
1973	Filmfare Awards South	Best Actress – Telugu	Jeevana Tarangalu
1974	Filmfare Awards South	Best Actress – Telugu	Krishnaveni
1975	Filmfare Awards South	Best Actress – Telugu	Jeevana Jyothi
2001	Tamil Nadu State Film Awards	Kavignar Kannadasan Award	Contribution to film industry
2004	Vamsi Awards	Meena Kumari Award	Contribution to film industry
2005	Madhavapeddi Prabhavathi Awards	Madhavapeddi Prabhavathi Award by the Siva Foundation	Contribution to film industry
2013	Nandi Awards	Raghupathi Venkaiah Award	Contribution to film industry
