= List of Telugu films of 1982 =

This is a list of films produced by the Cinema of Andhra Pradesh in the Telugu language based in Hyderabad, India in the year 1982.

== List of released films ==
=== January - March ===
Opening		Title	Director	Cast	Production	Ref
J A N	1	Jayasudha	K. V. Nandana Rao		Taraka Prabhu Films	
J A N	7	Anuraga Devatha	T. Rama Rao	N. T. Rama Rao, Sridevi, Jayasudha	Rama Krishna Cine Studios	
J A N	11	Raaga Deepam	Dasari Narayana Rao	Akkineni Nageswara Rao, Jayasudha, Lakshmi	Veera Rani Enterprises	
J A N	14	Bangaru Bhoomi	P. Chandrashekar Reddy	Krishna, Sridevi	Mahaeswari Movies	
J A N	14	Madhura Swapnam	K. Raghavendra Rao	Krishnam Raju, Jayasudha, Jaya Prada, Jaggaiah, Dr. M. Prabhakar Reddy, Kaikala Satyanarayana, Saradhi	Gopi Krishna Movies	
F E B	5	Evandoy Srimathi Garu	Relangi Narasimha Rao	Chandra Mohan Radhika, Giri Babu, K. Vijaya	Raja Lakshmi Combines	
F E B	5	Emandoyi Srimathigaru				
F E B	5	Subbarao Ki Kopam Vachhindi	Dhavala Satyam			
F E B	6	Andagaadu	T. N. Balu	Kamal Haasan, Sridevi, Geetha, Seema, Rao Gopala Rao, Allu Rama Lingaiah	Balu Cine Art	
F E B	12	Vamsha Gowravam	N. Ravindra Reddy	Sobhan Babu, Vijayashanti, Sujatha		
F E B	12	Bhale Kapuram	N. Gopalakrishna			
F E B	18	Maro Malupu	Vejella Satyanarayana	Gummadi, Sivakrishna, Leelavathi		
F E B	18	Bangaru Koduku	K. S. R. Das	Krishna, Sridevi		
F E B	20	Gruha Pravesam	Bairisetty Bhaskara Rao	Mohan Babu, Jayasudha	Sri Vighneshwara Pictures	
F E B	26	Cancer-Sukhavyadhulu	Pillai		Sastha Productions (Trivandrum)	
M A R	6	Himabindu				
M A R	6	Iddaru Kodukulu				
M A R	13	Kaliyuga Ramudu	K. Bapaiah	N. T. Rama Rao, Rati Agnihotri		
M A R	26	Nipputo Chelagaatam	Kommineni Seshagiri Rao	Krishnam Raju, Sharada, Sarath Babu		
M A R	20	Dharma Vaddi	K. B. Tilak	Jaggaiah, Krishnaveni, Saichand, Sudhakar, Nutan Prasad	Roopachitra Kalamandir	
M A R	26	Krishnarjunulu		Krishna, Sridevi, Jaya Prada		

=== April—June ===
Opening		Title	Director	Cast	Studio	Ref
A P R	2	Bangaru Kanuka	V. Madhusudhan Rao	Akkineni Nageswara Rao, Sridevi, Sujatha		
A P R	9	Viplava Shankam	Bheeram Masthan Rao			
A P R	9	Doctor Cine Actor	Vijaya Nirmala	Krishna, Jayasudha, Subhashini	Sri Films	
A P R	9	Malle Pandhiri				
A P R	21	Prema Murthulu				
A P R	21	Intlo Ramayya Veedhilo Krishnayya	Kodi Ramakrishna	Chiranjeevi, Madhavi, Gollapudi Maruthi Rao		
A P R	26	Ee Kaalam Katha				
M A Y	15	Nalugu Sthambalata	Jandhyala	Naresh, Poornima, Pradeep, Tulasi Shivamani		
M A Y	21	Kalahala Kapuram				
M A Y	28	Justice Chowdary	K. Raghavendra Rao	N. T. Rama Rao, Sridevi, Sharada, Jayanthi	Vijayalakshmi Art Pictures	
M A Y	29	Sri Lakshmi Nilayam	T. Krishna		Sarath Babu	
J U N	11	Subhalekha	K. Viswanath	Chiranjeevi, Sumalatha		
J U N	12	Radhamma Mogudu	C.S. Rao			
J U N	12	Korukunna Mogudu	Katta Subba Rao	Sobhan Babu, Lakshmi, Jayasudha, Nutan Prasad, Kaikala Satyanarayana	Vishnupriya Productions	
J U N	18	Chilipi Chinnodu	Rangarajan			
J U N	18	Pellilla Perayya	Kommineni	Chandra Mohan, Kaikala Satyanarayana, Giri Babu, Aruna, Prabha, Narayana Rao, Kavitha, Nutan Prasad, Krishnaveni, PL. Narayana, Sakshi Ranga Rao, Jyothilakshmi	G.V.K Combines	
J U N	24	Nivuru Gappina Nippu	K. Bapayya	Krishna, Sivaji Ganesan, Jaya Prada|		
J U N	24	Mahaprasthanam	K. Hemambaradara Rao	Madala Ranga Rao	Naveena Art Pictures	
J U N	26	Chandamama	Relangi Narasimha Rao	Murali Mohan, Saritha, Mohan Babu, Fatafat	K.C. Films International	
J U N	29	Gopala Krishnudu	A. Kodandamari Reddy	Akkineni Nageswara Rao, Jayasudha, Radha	Jyothi Art Creations	

=== July—September ===
Opening		Title	Director	Cast	Studio	Ref
J U L	1	Pratigya				
J U L	9	Bobbili Puli	Dasari Narayana Rao	N. T. Rama Rao, Sridevi		
J U L	16	Idi Pellantara	D. Vijaya Bhaskar	Chiranjeevi, Radhika		
J U L	23	Pelleedu Pillalu	Bapu	Suresh, Vijayashanti	Annapurna Pictures (P) Ltd.	
J U L	23	Prathikaram				
J U L	30	Sitadevi	Eranhi Sharma	Chiranjeevi, Jayasudha		
J U L	30	Radha My Darling	Bairisetty Bhaskara Rao	Chiranjeevi		
J U L	30	Punyabhumi Kallu Terichindhi	Devadas Kanakala		Arunodaya Film International	
A U G	6	Swayamvaram	Dasari Narayana Rao	Sobhan Babu, Jaya Prada		
A U G	6	Prema Nakshatram	P. Sambasiva Rao	Krishna, Sridevi, Manjula, Prasad Babu, Sulakshana	Hema International	
A U G	14	Ee Charithra Ye Siratho	Vejella Satyanarayana	Siva Krishna, Sai Chand, Gokina Rama Rao, P. L. Narayana, Ranganadh, Anupama	Sai Lakshmi Films	
A U G	14	Chalaki Chellamma				
A U G	20	Vayyari Bhamalu Vagalamari Bhartalu	Katta Subba Rao	N. T. Rama Rao, Krishna, Sridevi, Radhika	G.R.P. Art Pictures	
A U G	25	Golkonda Abbulu	Dasari Narayana Rao	Krishnam Raju	Lakshmi Devi Films	
S E P	3	Amara Geetham	R. Sundarrajan	Mohan, Poornima Jayaram, S. Ve. Shekher	Goteti Films	
S E P	3	Entha Gaatu Premayo	Parvataneni Sambasiva Rao			
S E P	3	Kayyala Ammayi Kalavari Abbayi	C. Venakata Ganesh	Chandra Mohan, Radhika, Satyanarayana, Allu Rama Lingaiah, Nutan Prasad, Ralla Palli, Manjula, Nirmala	Sri Dakshayani Creations	
S E P	3	Pagabattina Simham	P. Chandrasekhara Reddy	Krishna, Jaya Prada, Prabha, Geetha, Prasad Babu, Satyanarayana	Chandra Cine Arts	
S E P	10	Devatha	K. Raghavendra Rao	Sobhan Babu, Sridevi, Jaya Prada, Mohan Babu|	Suresh Productions	
S E P	18	Jaggu				
S E P	22	Krishnavataram	Bapu	Krishna, Sridevi, Vijayasanthi, K. Vijaya, P. R. Varalakshmi, Ramana Murthy, Vijaya Sumitra	Chitra Kalpana Films	
S E P	24	Meghasandesam	Dasari Narayana Rao	Akkineni Nageswara Rao, Jaya Prada, Jayasudha	Taraka Prabhu Films	

=== October—December ===
Opening		Title	Director	Cast	Studio	Ref
O C T	1	Tingu Rangadu	T. L. V. Prasad	Chiranjeevi, Geetha, Jaggayya, Janaki	Anil Productions	
O C T	1	Patnam Vachina Pativrathalu	T. S. B. K. Moulee	Chiranjeevi, Mohan Babu, Radhika		
O C T	1	Mantralaya Raghavendra Vaibhavam		Ramakrishna, Chandra Kala		
O C T	7	Aththaku Thagga Allullu	Rama Narayanan	Vijayasanthi, Radha, Suresh, Murali, Raja Sulochana	Lavanya Arts	
O C T	7	Ekalavya		Krishna, Jaya Prada		
O C T	9	Poola Pallaki	C. Umamaheswara Rao	Nalinikanth, Bhanuchandar, Prathap K. Pothan, Aruna, Karate Lakshmi, Sridhar, Eeswar	Sri Durga Movie Enterprises	
O C T	15	Jagannadha Rathachakralu	Narayana Rao Dasari	Krishna, Jaya Prada		
O C T	15	Billa-Ranga	K. S. R. Das	Chiranjeevi, Mohan Babu, Shyamala, Swapna	P.N.R Pictures	
O C T	20	Propakari Papanna	D. S. Prakasa Rao	Chandra Mohan, Kaikala Satyanarayana	Sri Tirumala Nagore Combines	
O C T	22	Telugunaadu	P. Lakshmi Deepak		Sri Veerakakani Pictures	
O C T	22	Yama Kinkarudu	Raj Bharat	Chiranjeevi, Radhika, Sarath Babu, Satyanarayana, Jaggaiah, Jayamalini	Geetha Arts	
O C T	22	Shamsher Shanker	K. S. R. Das	Krishna, Sridevi	Makkal Thilagam Movies	
O C T	22	Edhi Dharmam Edhi Nyayam	Bapu	Bhanu Chander, Kamal Haasan, Madhavi		
O C T	27	O Adadhi O Magadu	Dasari Narayana Rao	Alekhya, Ravindra, Balaji, Shahida, Srihari Murthy, Nagurbabu	Kaviratna Movies	
O C T	27	Naa Desam	K. Bapaiah	N. T. Rama Rao, Jayasudha, Satyanarayana, Jaggaiah, Giri Babu, Jamuna, Dr. Prabhakar Reddy, Kanchana	Pallavi Devi Productions	
O C T	28	Illali Korikalu	G. Raam Mohan Rao	Sobhan Babu, Jayasudha, Satyanarayana, Nirmala, Saroja, Rohini, Dr. M. Prabhakar Reddy	Babu Arts	
N O V	5	Tharangini	Kodi Ramakrishna	Suman, Tharangini, Bhanuchandar, Gollapudi, P.L. Narayana, Purnima	Prathap Art Productions	
N O V	6	Prema Sankellu	Vijaya Nirmala	Naresh, Syamala Gowri, Jaggaiah, Manjula, Subha, Satyanarayana, Jyothi Lakshmi, Giri Babu	Sri Vijaya Krishna Movies	
N O V	6	Mondi Ghatam	Raja Chandra	Chiranjeevi, Radhika, Kaikala Satyanarayana Gummadi, Annapurna, Rallapalli, Ravi Kondala Rao	Anantha Lakshmi International	
N O V	6	Kotha Neeru	K. S. Prakasa Rao	Chandra Mohan, Deepa, Kakarala, Allu Rama Lingaiah	Chitra Sahithi	
N O V	10	Pralaya Rudrudu	A. Kodhanda Rami Reddy	Krishnam Raju, Mohan Babu, Narayana Rao, Rao Gopala Rao, Dr. M. Prabhakar Reddy Jaya Prada, Aruna	Viswa Chitra Cine Enterprises	
N O V	14	Illanta Sandadi	Relangi Narasimha Rao	Chandra Mohan, Nutan Prasad, Prabha, Nirmala, Suvarna, Dr. M. Prabhakar Reddy, Jayamalini	Rajalakshmi Combines	
N O V	20	Savaal	Boyina Subba Rao	Mohan Babu, Sumalatha, Kaikala Satyanarayana, Allu Rama Lingaiah, Giri Babu, Rajyalakshmi, Syamala, Vijaya Lalitha	G.V.K. Combines	
N O V	20	Bhakta Dhruvamarkandeya	Bhanumathi Ramakrishna	Sobhana, Vamsikrishna, Hari, Ravisankar, Rohini, Rani, Rajasyamala, Babu, Suresh	Bharani Pictures	
N O V	20	Manchu Pallaki	Vamsy	Chiranjeevi, Suhasini, Rajendra Prasad, Sai-chand	Godavari Chitra	
N O V	20	Kadali Vachina Kanaka Durga	K. S. Reddy	Kavitha, Prasad Babu, Allu Rama Lingaiah, Ramana Murthy, Padmanbham, Sakshi Ranga Rao, Suryakantam	Surekha Enterprises	
N O V	26	Bandhalu Anubandhalu	Bhargav	Sobhan Babu, Lakshmi, Chiranjeevi, Jaggaiah, Mada, Padmanabham, Pandari Bai	Guna Chitra	
D E C	3	Anantha Ragalu	Prabhakar	Prabhakar, Subhakar, Mohan Rao, Subrahmanyam, Bhanupriya, Rajyalakshmi, Purnima, Rohini	Sree Sankuchakra Movies	
D E C	3	Kalavari Samsaram	K. S. Rami Reddy	Krishna, Sridevi, Kaikala Satyanarayana, Allu Rama Lingaiah, Giri Babu, Sudhakar, Geetha, Pandari Bai, Subha		
D E C	7	Doctor Malathi				
D E C	17	Eenadu		Krishna, Rao Gopala Rao, Chandra Mohan, Radhika		
D E C	22	Trisulam	K. Raghavendra Rao	Krishnam Raju, Sridevi		
D E C	28	Yuvraju	Dasari Narayana Rao	Akkineni Nageswara Rao, Jayasudha, Sujatha	Annapurna Studios	

== Dubbed films ==
Title	Director	Original film		Cast	Ref.
Title	Director	Title	Language	Cast	Ref.
Vijaya Bheri	Vijay Reddy	Huliya Haalina Mevu	Kannada	Rajkumar, Jaya Prada, Jayachitra	
Jai Santhoshi Matha	Vijay Sharma	Jai Santoshi Maa	Hindi	Anita Guha, Ashish Kumar, Kanan Kaushal, Rajan Haksar, Leela Mishra, Manhar Desai, Mahipal, Trilok Kapoor	
Vasantha Kokila	Balu Mahendra	Moondram Pirai	Tamil	Kamal Haasan, Sridevi, Silk Smitha	
Bhakta Gnanadeva	Hunsur Krishnamurthy	Bhakta Gnanadeva	Kannada	Jayanthi, Ramakrishna, Srinivasa Murthy	
Chattamtho Chelagatam	N. S. Rajbharath	Chinna Mul Peria Mul	Tamil	Rajesh, Baby Anju, Sreenath, Sumangali, Santhikrishna, A. Veerappan, Vani, Jayaram, Madhan	
Chilipi Vayasu	M. A. Kaja	Inikkum Ilamai	Tamil	Sudhakar, Radhika, Vijayakanth, ??Padmanabham, Suryakantham, Rama Prabha	
Musalodiki Dasara Panduga	S. P. Muthuraman	Netrikkan	Tamil	Rajinikanth, Lakshmi, Saritha, Menaka, Vijayashanti	
Savitri	Bharathan	Savithiri	Tamil	Vinodh, Menaka	
Purandara Dasu	R. Ramamurthy		Tamil		
Premaku Padhabhishekam	Durai	Kilinjalgal	Tamil	Dileep, Mohan, Poornima Jayaram, Sukumari, Sudha	
Pagabattina Bebbuli	S. V. Rajendra Singh Babu	Simhada Mari Sainya	Kannada	Arjun, Aruna, Jayanthi, Amrish Puri, Fighter Shetty etc	
Patnam Mogudu Palletoori Pellam	T. S. B. K. Moulee	Nandri, Meendum Varuga	Tamil	Prathap K. Pothan, Suhasini Maniratnam, Jaishankar	
Mettela Savvadi	Mahendran	Metti	Tamil	Sarath Babu, Radhika	
Garuda Rekha	P. S. Prakash	Garuda Rekhe	Kannada	Srinath, Ambika, Madhavi, K. Vijaya, Dinesh, Vajramuni, Tiger Prabhakar, Shakti Prasad	
Naa Pere Johnny	Mahendran	Johnny	Tamil	Rajinikanth, Sridevi, Deepa, Suruli Rajan	
Eeswara Kataksham	A. P. Nagarajan	Karaikkal Ammaiyar	Tamil	K. B. Sundarambal, R. Muthuraman, Lakshmi, Sivakumar, Srividya, 'Kumari' Padmini	
Grama Kakshalu	V. C. Guhanathan	Thanikattu Raja	Tamil	Ranjinikanth, Sridevi, Sripriya, Vijayakuma, Jaishankar	
Hanthakulaku Saval (Tamil Dubbed)	S. P. Muthuraman	Kazhugu (1981 film)	Tamil	Rajinikanth, Rati Agnihotri, Sumalatha, V. K. Ramasamy, Cho Ramaswamy	
Jayamalini	A. Jagananathan	Sorgathin Thirappu Vizha	Tamil	Jayamalini, Jayachitra, Jai Ganesh, Srikanth	
Jai Mahakali	Babubhai Mistri	Jai Maha Kali	Hindi	Vikram Gokhale, Ranjana Deshmukh, Hercules, Dinesh Hingoo	
Dongalosthunnaru Jagratta	R. Thygarajan		Tamil		
Mahanati	S. R. Puttanna Kanagal	Ranganayaki	Kannada	Ambareesh, Aarathi, Ramakrishna, Ashok	
Palletoori Simham	S. P. Muthuraman	Sakalakala Vallavan	Tamil	Kamal Haasan, Ambika, Silk Smitha	
