= Veturi =

Indian lyricist and poet (1936–2010)

Veturi Sundararama Murthy
- Portrait of Veturi
- Born: Veturi Sundararama Murthy; 29 January 1936; Pedakallepalli, Madras Presidency, British India (present-day Andhra Pradesh, India)
- Died: 22 May 2010 (aged 74); Hyderabad, Andhra Pradesh, India (present-day Telangana)
- Occupations: Poet, lyricist, songwriter
- Spouse: Seeta Mahalakshmi
- Children: 3

Veturi Sundararama Murthy (30 January 1936 – 22 May 2010), known mononymously by his surname Veturi, was an Indian poet and lyricist who is known for his works in Telugu literature and cinema. Veturi is a recipient of the National Film Award, various Nandi Awards, Filmfare Awards, and other state honors. His career in Telugu cinema spanned more than four decades.

== Early life ==
Veturi was born to Chandrasekhar Sastry and Kamalamba in Pedakallepalli, near Challapalli, Krishna into a Telugu Brahmin family. Veturi was a nephew of the Telugu Research Scholar Veturi Prabhakara Sastri. His grandfather Veturi Sundara Sastry was also a poet.

=== Education ===
Veturi completed his schooling in Diviseema, Jaggayyapeta, near Vijayawada in Krishna district, and SSLC in his grandmother's village. Later, Veturi went to Chennai for his intermediate studies and came back to Vijayawada where he completed his degree at S.R.R. Government College. He was a student of the legendary Viswanatha Satyanarayana at this college.

== Career as a journalist ==
Veturi joined Andhra Prabha as a journalist in 1952, after his education. He learned the basics of editing a news article from his senior at Andhra Prabha, Narla Venkateswara Rao, whom he considers his first teacher. In 1959, he joined a weekly called Andhra Patrika, where Bapu and Mullapudi Venkata Ramana were his colleagues. He was the in-charge of the Cinema section at Andhra Patrika. He also worked for the Andhra Pradesh Congress Committee's official daily newspaper, called Andhra Janata, as an editor.

In 1962, he became the first and only Telugu journalist to interview the then Prime Minister, Jawaharlal Nehru, who came to inaugurate the Srisailam Hydroelectricity project. He covered the speeches of national leaders like Sarvepalli Radhakrishnan. In 1964, he worked as an assembly reporter.

His articles are said to be very catchy and witty. For instance, he referred to the meeting of MLAs in Hotel Dwaraka, near the Andhra Pradesh State Assembly as "Adigo Dwaraka - Ivigo Alamandalu" ("This is Dwaraka and here are the cattle") (Telugu: అదిగో ద్వారక - ఇవిగో అలమంధలు). His writing style caught the attention of the film industry due to his use of traditional poetic rules related to alliteration and rhyme for describing current affairs.

== Career as a lyricist ==
=== Entry into films ===
Veturi had contacts with the Telugu film industry during his days as a journalist. He used to meet veteran lyric writer Dasarathi often. Legendary director V. Nagayya offered him a role in his film, Naa Illu (1953). However, two days before the shooting began, Veturi decided not to act as he felt that he was not fit for acting, and wrote a letter of apology to Nagayya for rejecting his offer. N. T. Rama Rao, has invited him to join the film industry as a lyricist. In 1974, he wrote his first song, "Bharatanaari Charitamu" (Telugu: భారతనారి చరితము), in the form of Harikatha, for O Seeta Katha (1974) under the direction of K. Viswanath.

=== 1970s ===
In 1978, K Viswanath's Siri Siri Muvva proved his prowess in expressing diverse emotions with poetry. In 1977, actor Sr. N.T.R's Adavi Ramudu showcased Veturi's talent for penning inspirational and romantic lyrics. The album was an instant hit among various audiences. Acharya Aatreya, the leading lyricist in those days, was known to take days for writing a song. Veturi became the first choice for directors and producers too because of his ability to write a song to the director's taste in a few minutes. He went on to pen more than 6,000 songs in his career. He wrote more mass numbers for movies like Vetagadu and Driver Ramudu, and classics for movies like Sankarabharanam and Sagara Sangamam. In particular, Sankarabharanam stood as a landmark in the Telugu film industry.

=== 1980s ===
After the surge of his popularity during the 1970s, he went on to work with a variety of directors and actors in the 1980s. He wrote classics for directors like Singeetam Srinivasa Rao, Dasari Narayana Rao, Bapu, Jandhyala, Vamsy and mass numbers for directors like Raghavendra Rao, A. Kodandarami Reddy, Vijaya Bapineedu. He delivered a number of hits for senior actors like Sr. N.T.R, Akkineni Nageswara Rao, Ghattamaneni Krishna, Shobhan Babu, Krishnam Raju and upcoming stars like Chiranjeevi, Nandamuri Balakrishna, Nagarjuna, Daggubati Venkatesh. This golden period in his career saw memorable albums like Saptapadi, Subhodayam, Subhalekha, Sagara Sangamam, Meghasandesam, Mudda Mandaram, Malle Pandiri, Nalugu Stambhalata, Rendu Jalla Seeta, Amarajeevi, Sreevariki Prema Lekha, Ananda Bhairavi, Srivari Sobhanam, Mogudu Pellalu, Chantabbai, Sitaara, Anveshana, Alapana, Mayuri, Amavasya Chandrudu, Janaki Ramudu and Geetaanjali.

=== 1990s ===
During the late 1980s, Veturi's mass numbers garnered a lot of response from the public resulting in directors demanding more and more of them. However, Veturi still maintained his balance between classics and mass-numbers with movies like Jagadeka Veerudu Atiloka Sundari, Sarigamalu, Sitaramayya Gaari Manavaralu, Matru Devo Bhava, and Mechanic Alludu. Veturi was given the opportunity to dub many Tamil, Malayalam and Hindi movies. Some of his dubbed albums, for instance Iruvar and Devaraagam, received wide acclaim.

=== 2000s ===
During this period, Veturi created classics like Gangotri and Swarabhishekam. His association with young directors like Sekhar Kammula and Gunasekhar produced some memorable albums, like Anand, Godavari, Varudu, Arjun, Premishte (Dubbed version of Kaadhal) and Leader.

== Awards and honors ==
Veturi received several national and regional awards for his contributions to literature and films. He has been conferred an honorary Doctorate in the 23rd convocation of Acharya Nagarjuna University. In 2007, he received the Jandhyala Memorial Award.

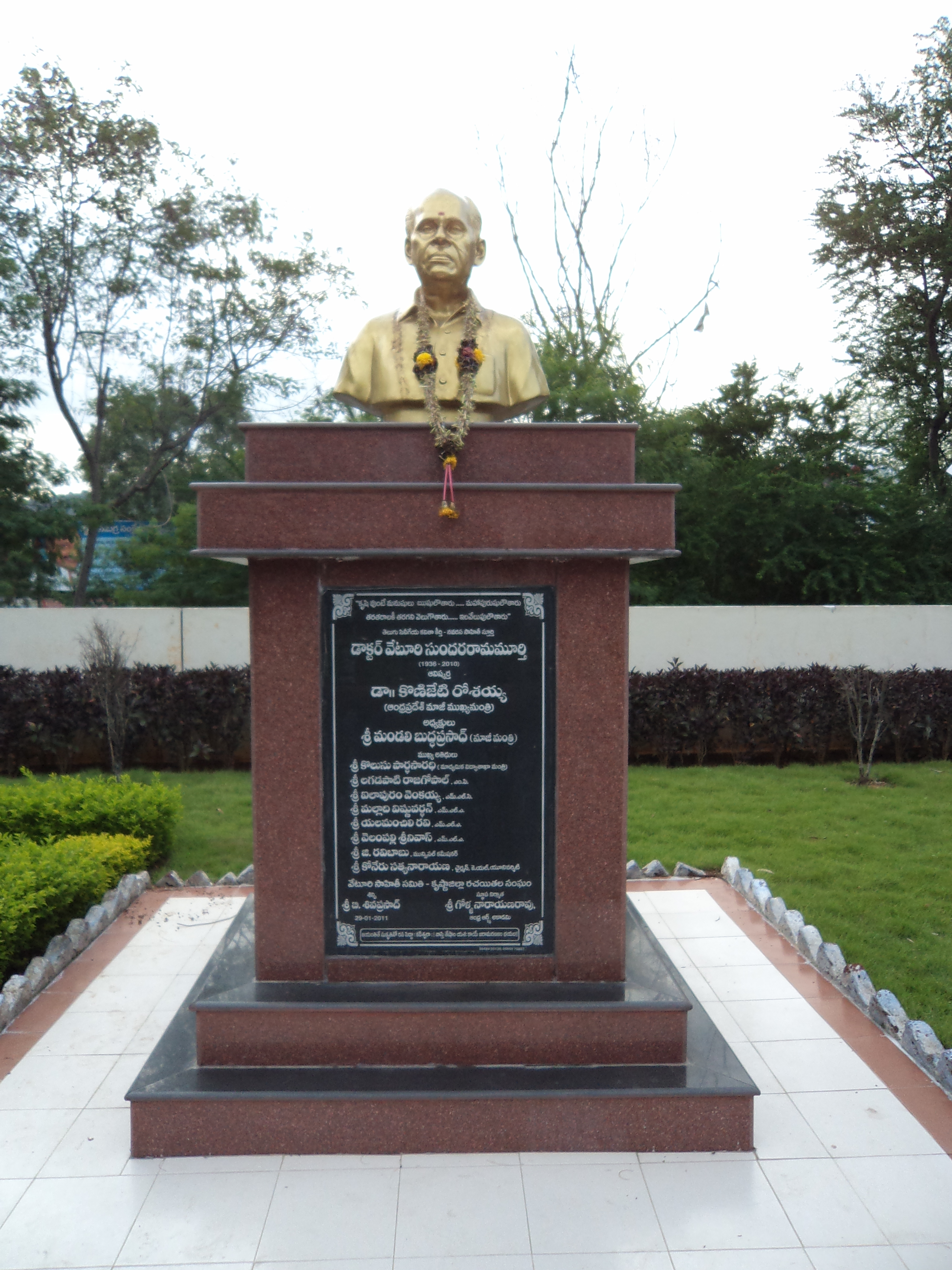
Bust of Veturi at Tummalapalli Kshetrayya Kalakshetram, Vijayawada

=== National Awards ===
He got the National Film Award for Best Lyrics for the song "Ralipoye Puvva" (Telugu: రాలిపోయె పువ్వా) in the film Matrudevobhava, making him the second Telugu film lyricist to achieve the distinction after the revolutionary poet, Sri Sri. In 2006, he declared that he would return the National Award if Telugu is not given the status of Classical Language by the Government of India. In 2008, the Government of India declared Telugu as a classical language.

=== Filmfare Awards ===
He received filmfare award for the song, Uppongele Godavari (Telugu: ఉప్పొంగెలే గోదావరి) in the 2006 movie, Godavari. In 2008, he received the Filmfare Lifetime Achievement Award.

=== Nandi Awards ===
He received the Nandi award for best lyrics, from the Government of Andhra Pradesh, six times. They are listed here.

| Year | Song | Movie |
|---|---|---|
| 1977 | Maanasa Veenaa Madhu Geetam (Telugu: మానసవీణ మధుగీతం) | Panthulamma |
| 1979 | Sankara Naadasareeraparaa (Telugu: శంకరా నాదశరీరాపర) | Sankarabharanam |
| 1984 | Brundavani Vundi (Telugu: బృందావని ఉంది) | Kanchana Ganga |
| 1985 | Ee Duryodhana Dushaasana (Telugu: ఈ దుర్యోధనదుశ్శాశన) | Pratighatana |
| 1991 | Pavuraniki Panjaraniki (Telugu: పావురానికి పంజరానికి) | Chanti |
| 1992 | All Songs | Rajeswari Kalyanam |

=== Manaswini Awards ===
He received two Manaswini awards.

1. Song: Venuvai vachchaanu (Telugu: వేణువై వచ్చాను), Movie: Matrudevobhava, Year: 1993.
2. Song: Aakaashaana suryudundadu (Telugu: ఆకాశాన సూర్యుడుండడు), Movie: Sundarakanda, Year: 1992.

== Filmography ==
He wrote thousands of songs as a lyricist for many successful Telugu films. He has also acted in very few films in cameo roles. He acted as a fake swamiji in a film, which succeeded in producing good comedy. He also penned Dialogues along with writer Jandhyala for the movie Siri Siri Muvva.

=== 1970s ===
- O Seeta Katha (1974)
- Adavi Ramudu (1977)
- Pantulamma (1977)
- Siri Siri Muvva (1978)
- Gorintaku (1979)
- Sankarabharanam (1979)

=== 1980s ===
- Challenge Ramudu (1980)
- Love in Singapore (1980)
- Gharana Donga (1980)
- Yedanthasthula Meda (1980)
- Rowdy Ramudu Konte Krishnudu (1980)
- Mogudu Kavali (1980)
- Sarada Ramudu (1980)
- Aarani Manthalu (1980)
- Bhale Krishnudu (1980)
- Superman (1980)
- Alludu Pattina Bharatam (1980)
- Sita Ramulu (1980)
- Punnami Naagu (1980)
- Circus Ramudu (1980)
- Ram Robert Rahim (1980)
- Aatagadu (1980)
- Saptapadi (1981)
- Puli Bidda (1981)
- Mudda Mandaram (1981)
- Priya (1981)
- Kondaveeti Simham (1981)
- Thodu Dongalu (1981)
- Ragile Jwala (1981)
- Prema Simhasanam (1981)
- Srirasthu Subhamasthu (1981)
- Devudu Mavayya (1981)
- Viswaroopam (1981)
- Seethakoka Chilaka (1981)
- Nyayam Kavali (1981)
- Ooruki Monagadu (1981)
- Maha Purushudu (1981)
- Parvathi Parameswarulu (1981)
- Satyam Sivam (1981)
- Sri Vemana Charithra (1981)
- Doctor Cine Actor (1982)
- Manchu Pallaki (1982)
- Bobbili Puli (1982)
- Nalugu Stambalata (1982)
- Bangaru Kanuka (1982)
- Tingu Rangadu (1982)
- Gopala Krishnudu (1982)
- Talli Kodukula Anubandham (1982)
- Vayyari Bhamalu Vagalamari Bhartalu (1982)
- Edi Dharmam Edi Nyayam? (1982)
- Justice Chowdary (1982)
- Pagabattina Simham (1982)
- Yamakinkarudu (1982)
- Raaga Deepam (1982)
- Naa Desam (1982)
- Anuraga Devatha (1982)
- Subhalekha (1982)
- Bandalu Anubandhalu (1982)
- Patnam Vachina Pativrathalu (1982)
- Khaidi (1983)
- Poratam (1983)
- Manthri Gari Viyyankudu (1983)
- Meghasandesham (1983)
- Sangharshana (1983)
- Mundadugu (1983)
- Abhilasha (1983)
- Siripuram Monagadu (1983)
- Puli Bebbuli (1983)
- Shivudu Shivudu Shivudu (1983)
- Simham Navvindi (1983)
- Prema Pichollu (1983)
- Bezawada Bebbuli (1983)
- Kirayi Kotigadu (1983)
- Ramarajyamlo Bheemaraju (1983)
- Moodu Mullu (1983)
- Rendu Jella Sita (1983)
- Palletoori Monagadu (1983)
- Sagara Sangamam (1983)
- Amarajeevi (1983)
- Sitaara (1983)
- Devanthakudu (1984)
- Bobbili Brahmanna (1984)
- Sampoorna Premayanam (1984)
- Rustum (1984)
- Bharatamlo Shankaravam (1984)
- Vasantha Geetam (1984)
- Anubandham (1984)
- Sahasame Jeevitham (1984)
- Merupu Daadi (1984)
- Goonda (1984)
- Swathi (1984)
- Pralaya Simham (1984)
- Agni Gundam (1984)
- Tandava Krishnudu (1984)
- Disco King (1984)
- Nayakulaku Saval (1984)
- Mahanagaramlo Mayagadu (1984)
- Illalu Priyuralu (1984)
- Srivariki Premalekha (1984)
- Naagu (1984)
- Janani Janmabhoomi (1984)
- Intiguttu (1984)
- Kathanayakudu (1984)
- Challenge (1984)
- Pattabhishekam (1985)
- Raktha Sindhuram (1985)
- Surya Chandra (1985)
- America Alludu (1985)
- Dampatyam (1985)
- Agni Parvatam (1985)
- Darja Donga (1985)
- Adavi Donga (1985)
- Kattula Kondayya (1985)
- Bullet (1985)
- Illale Devata (1985)
- Pachani Kapuram (1985)
- Donga (1985)
- Aatmabalam (1985)
- Vijetha (1985)
- Nyayam Meere Cheppali (1985)
- Puli (1985)
- Babai Abbai (1985)
- Kotha Pelli Koothuru (1985)
- Preminchu Pelladu (1985)
- Terror (1985)
- Punnami Rathri (1985)
- Kanchu Kavacham (1985)
- Anveshana (1985) (writer)
- Seetharama Kalyanam (1986)
- Chantabbai (1986)
- Kaliyuga Pandavulu (1986)
- Vikram (1986)
- Kondaveeti Raja (1986)
- Nippulanti Manishi (1986)
- Kirathakudu (1986)
- Anasuyamma Gari Alludu (1986)
- Magadheerudu (1986)
- Driver Babu (1986)
- Kaliyuga Krishnudu (1986)
- Brahma Rudrulu (1986)
- Santhi Nivasam (1986)
- Kashmora (1986)
- Dhairyavanthudu (1986)
- Aranyakanda (1986)
- Krishna Garadi (1986)
- Desoddharakulu (1986)
- Chanakya Sapatham (1986)
- Apoorva Sahodarulu (1986)
- Rakshasudu (1986)
- Simhasanam (1986)
- Oka Radha Iddaru Krishnulu (1986)
- Rendu Rellu Aaru (1986)
- Khaidi Rudrayya (1986)
- Brahmastram (1986)
- Padaharella Ammayi (1986)
- Jayam Manade (1986)
- Karu Diddina Kapuram (1986)
- Thandri Kodukula Challenge (1987)
- Makutamleni Maharaju (1987)
- Padamati Sandhya Ragam (1987)
- Bhargava Ramudu (1987)
- Ajeyudu (1987)
- Sardar Krishnama Naidu (1987)
- Dharmapatni (1987)
- Allari Krishnayya (1987)
- Sankharavam (1987)
- Vijetha Vikram (1987)
- Donga Garu Swagatham (1987)
- Ramu (1987)
- Dammit Katha Addam Thirigindi (1987)
- Chakravarthy (1987)
- Aha! Naa Pellanta!! (1987)
- Collector Gari Abbayi (1987)
- Prema Samrat (1987)
- Trimurthulu (1987)
- Kirayi Dada (1987)
- Srinivasa Kalyanam (1987)
- Muddayi (1987)
- Bhanumati Gari Mogudu (1987)
- Agni Putrudu (1987)
- Pasivadi Pranam (1987)
- Sahasa Samrat (1987)
- Gundammagari Krishnulu (1987)
- Jebu Donga (1987)
- President Gari Abbai (1987)
- Maa Voori Magadu (1987)
- Donga Pelli (1988)
- Chuttalabbayi (1988)
- Bava Marudula Saval (1988)
- Aakhari Poratam (1988)
- Bazaar Rowdy (1988)
- Yamudiki Mogudu (1988)
- Asthulu Anthasthulu (1988)
- Marana Mrudangam (1988)
- Jeevana Jyothi (1988)
- Chikkadu Dorakadu (1988)
- Varasudochadu (1988)
- Samsaram (1988)
- Tiragabadda Telugubidda (1988)
- Mugguru Kodukulu (1988)
- Chinababu (1988)
- Raktabhishekam (1988)
- Jeevana Ganga (1988)
- Inspector Pratap (1988)
- Jhansi Rani (1988)
- Rowdy No.1 (1988)
- Trinetrudu (1988)
- Chinnodu Peddodu (1988)
- Bharatamlo Bala Chandrudu (1988)
- Khaidi No. 786 (1988)
- August 15 Raatri (1988)
- Janaki Ramudu (1988)
- Ugra Nethrudu (1988)
- Aswaddhama (1988)
- Rao Gari Illu (1988)
- Yuddha Bhoomi (1988)
- Ramudu Bheemudu (1988)
- Donga Kollu (1988)
- Raktha Tilakam (1988)
- Vivaha Bhojanambu (1988)
- Goonda Rajyam (1989)
- Koduku Diddina Kapuram (1989)
- Bhale Donga (1989)
- Palnati Rudraiah (1989)
- Attaku Yamudu Ammayiki Mogudu (1989)
- Gudachari 117 (1989)
- Ajatha Satruvu (1989)
- Vicky Dada (1989)
- Bhale Dampathulu (1989)
- Baamma Mata Bangaru Baata (1989)
- Sahasame Naa Oopiri (1989)
- Dhruva Nakshatram (1989)
- Prema (1989)
- Zoo Laka Taka (1989)
- Sarvabhomudu (1989)
- Vijay (1989)
- Gaduggai (1989)
- Bala Gopaludu (1989)
- State Rowdy (1989)
- Rudranetra (1989)
- Agni (1989)
- Two Town Rowdy (1989)
- Siva (1989)
- Bandhuvulostunnaru Jagratha (1989)
- Geetaanjali (1989)

=== 1990s ===
- Iddaru Iddare (1990)
- Jagadeka Veerudu Athiloka Sundari (1990)
- Kodama Simham (1990)
- Aayudham (1990)
- Prema Zindabad (1990)
- Chinnari Muddula Papa (1990)
- Nari Nari Naduma Murari (1990)
- Prananiki Pranam (1990)
- Balachandrudu (1990)
- Anna Thammudu (1990)
- Dagudumuthula Dampathyam (1990)
- Neti Siddhartha (1990)
- Kondaveeti Donga (1990)
- Aggi Ramudu (1990)
- Kokila (1990)
- Inspector Rudra (1990)
- Prema Yuddham (1990)
- Raja Vikramarka (1990)
- Surya IPS (1991)
- Attintlo Adde Mogudu (1991)
- Peddinti Alludu (1991)
- Talli Tandrulu (1991)
- Vichitra Prema (1991)
- Parama Sivudu (1991)
- Gang Leader (1991)
- Nirnayam (1991)
- Aditya 369 (1991)
- Minor Raja (1991)
- Shatruvu (1991)
- Jagannatakam (1991)
- Alludu Diddina Kapuram (1991)
- Chaitanya (1991)
- Shanti Kranti (1991)
- Dharma Kshetram (1992)
- Chanti (1992)
- Dharma Kshetram (1992)
- Appula Appa Rao (1992)
- Teja (1992) (actor)
- Balarama Krishnulu (1992)
- Chitram Bhalare Vichitram (1992)
- Seetharatnam Gari Abbayi (1992)
- Aa Okkati Adakku (1992)
- President Gari Pellam (1992)
- Sundarakanda (1992)
- Killer (1992)
- Pellaniki Premalekha Priyuraliki Subhalekha (1992)
- Aswamedham (1992)
- Sahasam (1992)
- Govinda Govinda (1993)
- Kondapalli Raja (1993)
- Nippu Ravva (1993)
- Ali Baba Aradajanu Dongalu (1993)
- Muta Mestri (1993)
- Rajeswari Kalyanam (1993)
- Bava Bavamaridi (1993)
- Rakshana (1993)
- Mister Pellam (1993)
- Allari Priyudu (1993)
- Matru Devo Bhava (1993)
- Allari Alludu (1993)
- Mechanic Alludu (1993)
- Abbayigaru (1993)
- Varasudu (1993)
- Allari Premikudu (1994)
- Bhairava Dweepam (1994)
- Gang Master (1994)
- Super Police (1994)
- Bhale Pellam (1994)
- Mugguru Monagallu (1994)
- Bobbili Simham (1994)
- Police Brothers (1994)
- Jailor Gari Abbayi (1994)
- Bangaru Kutumbam (1994)
- Govinda Govinda (1994)
- Muddula Priyudu (1994)
- Gandeevam (1994)
- Hello Brother (1994)
- Rikshavodu (1995)
- Bhale Bullodu (1995)
- Ketu Duplicatu (1995)
- Pokiri Raja (1995)
- Gharana Bullodu (1995)
- Rambantu (1995)
- Alluda Majaka (1995)
- Ramudochadu (1996)
- Dharma Chakram (1996)
- Jabilamma Pelli (1996)
- Adirindi Alludu (1996)
- Vamsanikokkadu (1996)
- Sahasa Veerudu Sagara Kanya (1996)
- Ramudochadu (1996)
- Sri Krishnarjuna Vijayam (1996)
- Iddaru (1997) (Dubbed version)
- Peddannayya (1997)
- Annamayya (1997)
- Chilakkottudu (1997)
- Muddula Mogudu (1997)
- Hitler (1997)
- Choodalani Vundi (1998)
- Manasichi Choodu (1998)
- Ganesh (1998)
- Yuvarathna Rana (1998)
- Sneham Kosam (1999)
- Krishna Babu (1999)
- Seenu (1999)
- Ravoyi Chandamama (1999)
- Sultan (1999)
- Adbhutam (1999)
- Samarasimha Reddy (1999)
- Rajakumarudu (1999)

=== 2000s ===
- Badri (2000) (Vevela Mainala Ganam Chali Pidugullo)
- Annayya (2000) (Himaseemallo, Gusagusale, Vaana vallappa)
- Sakhi (2000, Dubbed version) (Sakhiya Celiya, Alai Pongeraa, Kailove Chedugudu, Kalalai Poyenu, Snehituda Snehituda, September Maasam, Yede Yedeydey)
- Bava Nachadu (2001) (Akka Bava Nachada)
- Mrigaraju (2001) (Ramaiah Paadaletti, Satamanamannadile, Yelaley Yelalamma)
- Indra (2002) (Ammadu Appachi)
- Tagore (2003) (Manmadha Manmadha)
- Simhadri (2003)
- Anand (2004) (Vacche Vacche, Yamunatheeram, Nuvvena, Charumati I Love You, Telisi Telisi, Yedalogaanam)
- Arjun (2004) (Madhura Madhura Meenakshi)
- Arya (2004)
- Premisthe (2004, Dubbed version)
- Abhi (2004) ("Vangathota")
- Chatrapati (2005)
- Ghajini (Hrudayam Ekkadunnadi, Oku Maru Kalisina) (Telugu version)
- Godavari (2006) (Uppongele Godavari)
- Hanuman (2006, Dubbed version)
- Sainikudu (2006)
- Madhumasam (2007)
- Happy Days (2007)
- Surya S/o Krishnan (2008) (Telugu version)
- Dashavataram (2008, Dubbed version)
- Kantri (2008) (Vayasunamy)
- Sundarakanda (2008) (lyricist)
- Malli Malli (2009)
- Bendu Apparao R.M.P (2009)
- Varudu (2010) (All songs)
- Leader (2010)
- Simha (2010) (Kanulara Chudhamu)
- Villain (2010) (dubbed version of Raavanan)
- Badrinath (2011) (Omkareshwari)
- Bus Stop (2012) ("Rekkalocchina Prema" and "Pattuko Pattuko")

== Books ==
=== Sirikaakolanu Chinnadi ===
This book was originally a "musical play" telecasted on the All India Radio. The story describes the culture and people during the time of the king Krishna Deva Raya through the story of a Devadasi. The original play has music by the great music director Pendyala Nageswara Rao. One can see the beauty of the Telugu language in this book. Veturi was introduced to the director K. Viswanath through this book and later their combination was a big hit. N.T.Rama Rao was so impressed by the story of this book that he wanted to make it as a movie. It is believed that there were some discussions on the script but the movie was never produced.

=== Komma Kommako Sannaayi ===
A book titled komma kommako sannAyi was published by "Veturi Sahitii Samiti". This book contains 27 articles written by Veturi celebrating his association with some famous personalities in the Telugu film industry. It also contains descriptions of some of his songs. The personalities covered include the following:

1. Music directors: Pendyala Nageswara Rao, S. Rajeswara Rao, K. V. Mahadevan, Adi Narayana Rao, Ramesh Naidu, Rajan – Nagendra, Chakravarty, Ilayaraja, MM Keeravaani & A.R.Rahman
2. Singers: S._P._Balasubrahmanyam
3. Lyricists: Daita Gopalam, Samudrala (Sr), Atreya, Dasarathi,
4. Actors: Nagayya, Jagayya, N. T. Rama Rao & Relangi
5. Directors and producers: Nagi Reddy, Jandhyala, Bapu – Ramana

Many of these articles were originally published in a Telugu magazine called Haasam. Veturi's prowess in the Telugu language & literature and his vast knowledge of Carnatic music can be seen in this book. Veturi often quotes many of his own lyrics in this book and those examples offer a glimpse of his genius. In particular, his explanation of the song Swararaaga gangaa pravaahamE (Movie: Sarigamalu) is a masterpiece.

== Personal life ==
Veturi was married to Seeta Maha Lakshmi and has three sons: Ravi Prakash, Chandrasekhar and Nanda Kishore

== Controversies ==
In March 2010, Veturi openly criticized the Film Nagar Cooperative Society officials for not handing over the 1000 sq.yard land that was allotted to him about 28 years ago. He alleged that several juniors and ineligible people were given plots ahead of him. He was allegedly offered a double bedroom flat for 1.5 million.

After his death, noted singer Mano and senior actor Vijay Chandar demanded the government to give the land to his family.

== Death ==
Veturi died of a pulmonary hemorrhage at a private hospital in Hyderabad on 22 May 2010, aged 74, at about 9:30 p.m. local time. He was admitted to the hospital two days earlier and was kept in the Intensive Care Unit (ICU) there as his health was deteriorating.

K. Viswanath, who introduced Veturi to the film industry, stated that "his works would please even the gods". Director Sekhar Kammula, who worked with him to deliver some critically acclaimed songs, wrote a four-page article in the daily Sakshi describing Veturi's death as his "personal loss".

== Legacy ==
Appaji Ambarisha Darbha, a creative digital-media professional turned actor made a font with the name "Veturi" which was inaugurated by Telugu lyricist Sirivennela Seetharama Sastry in 2018.
