= Chinababu =

- Theatrical release poster
- Directed by: A. Mohan Gandhi
- Screenplay by: A. Mohan Gandhi
- Dialogues by: Paruchuri Brothers
- Story by: Paruchuri Brothers
- Produced by: D. Ramanaidu
- Starring: Nagarjuna; Amala Akkineni
- Cinematography: P. S. Prakash
- Edited by: K. A. Marthand
- Music by: Chakravarthy
- Production company: Suresh Productions
- Release date: 6 May 1988
- Running time: 146 mins
- Country: India
- Language: Telugu

Chinababu is a 1988 Telugu-language drama film, produced by D. Ramanaidu under the Suresh Productions banner and directed by A. Mohan Gandhi. It stars Nagarjuna, Amala Akkineni and music composed by Chakravarthy. The film was dubbed in Tamil as Paasathai Thirudathe.

== Cast ==
- Nagarjuna as Venu Gopal
- Amala Akkineni as Madhu
- Rao Gopal Rao as Mukkamala Chakrapani
- Mohan Babu as Sunnam Chinna Rao
- Murali Mohan as Rama Rao
- Nutan Prasad as Rayudu
- Siva Krishna as Shivam
- Subhalekha Sudhakar as Satyam
- Chalapathi Rao
- Suthi Velu as Parvathalu
- Brahmanandam as Panakaalu
- Gundu Hanumantha Rao
- Telephone Satyanarayana as I.G.
- Tata Appa Rao as Minister
- Dham
- Rajya Lakshmi as Lakshmi
- Malashri as Poorna
- Kakinada Shyamala as Durgamma
- Mamatha as Parvatamma
- Chandrika as Jaya

== Crew ==
- Art: G. V. Subba Rao
- Choreography: K. S. Raghuram
- Fights: Vijayan
- Story & Dialogues: Paruchuri Brothers
- Lyrics: Veturi
- Playback: S. P. Balasubrahmanyam, S. Janaki, P. Susheela, S. P. Sailaja
- Editing: K. A. Marthand
- Cinematography: P. S. Prakash
- Music: Chakravarthy
- Producer: D. Ramanaidu
- Director: A. Mohana Gandhi
- Banner: Suresh Productions
- Release Date: 6 May 1988

== Soundtrack ==
Chinababu

Film score by Chakravarthy
- Released: 1988
- Genre: Soundtrack
- Length: 22:03
- Label: AVM Audio
- Producer: Chakravarthy

Chakravarthy chronology
Inspector Pratap (1988)	Chinababu (1988)	Donga Ramudu (1988)

The music was composed by Chakravarthy. Lyrics were written by Veturi and Bhuvana Chandra. Music released on AVM Audio Company.

S. No.	Song title	Singers	length
1	"Chikkindi Chakkanaina"	S. P. Balasubrahmanyam, S. Janaki	4:03
2	"My Dear Nestam"	S. P. Balasubrahmanyam	4:46
3	"Dammunte Kasko"	S. P. Balasubrahmanyam, S. Janaki	4:15
4	"Subhasya Seeghramga"	S. P. Balasubrahmanyam, S.P. Sailaja	4:29
5	"Manasu Neepaina "	P. Susheela, Mohan Babu	4:26
