= Koteeswarudu =

- Theatrical release poster
- Directed by: Kommineni Seshagiri Rao
- Written by: Kommineni (screenplay / dialogues)
- Story by: Bhishetty
- Produced by: T. R. Srinivas; P. H. Rama Rao
- Starring: Akkineni Nageswara Rao; Sujatha
- Cinematography: S. Navakanth
- Edited by: Vemuri Ravi
- Music by: Chakravarthy
- Production company: Sri Sarath Arts
- Release date: 6 January 1984
- Running time: 142 mins
- Country: India
- Language: Telugu

Koteeswarudu (transl. Millionaire) is a 1984 Telugu-language action drama film, produced by T. R. Srinivas, P. H. Rama Rao under the Sri Sarath Arts banner and directed by Kommineni Seshagiri Rao. It stars Akkineni Nageswara Rao and Sujatha, with music composed by Chakravarthy.

== Cast ==
- Akkineni Nageswara Rao as Krishna
- Sujatha as Radha
- Jaggayya as Nagendra aka Big Boss
- Gummadi as Jail Superintendent Mahendra
- Sarath Babu as Buchi Babu
- Ranganath as S.P.
- Nutan Prasad as Paratparam aka Small Boss
- Mikkilineni as Narayana
- Nagesh as Little Boss
- Sakshi Ranga Rao as Ranganatham
- Chalapati Rao as Manohar
- Ch. Krishna Murthy as Gangulu
- Sarathi as Lingaiah
- Pandari Bai as Shanthamma
- Rajasulochana as Rajeswaramma
- P. R. Varalakshmi as Koulasya
- Jayamalini as Dancer in "Mattu Mattu Mattulona" song
- Chandrika as Lakshmi

== Soundtrack ==
Koteeswarudu

Film score by Chakravarthy
- Released: 1984
- Genre: Soundtrack
- Length: 21:02
- Label: AVM Audio
- Producer: Chakravarthy

Chakravarthy chronology
Sri Ranga Neethulu (1984)	Koteeswarudu (1984)	Tandava Krishnudu (1984)

Music composed by Chakravarthy.

S. No.	Song title	Lyrics	Singers	length
1	"Eelokam Mayalokam"	Rajasri	S. P. Balasubrahmanyam	4:08
2	"Gopemma Gopemma"	C. Narayana Reddy	S. P. Balasubrahmanyam, P. Susheela	4:25
3	"Idepaata Idepaata"	Rajasri	Jaya Chandran, P. Susheela	4:08
4	"Chiguraaku Subhalekha"	Rajasri	S. P. Balasubrahmanyam, P. Susheela	4:13
5	"Mattu Mattu Mattulona"	Arudra	S. P. Balasubrahmanyam, S. P. Sailaja	4:08
