= Nandi Awards of 1974 =

Indian Telugu film and TV awards ceremony

The Nandi Awards were presented annually by the Government of Andhra Pradesh to recognise excellence in Telugu cinema. The first awards were presented in 1964. The following won the best films awards in 1974.

== 1974 Nandi Awards Winners List ==
Category	Winner	Film
Best Feature Film	V. Ramachandra Rao	Alluri Seetarama Raju
Second Best Feature Film	K. Viswanath	O Seeta Katha
Third Best Feature Film	U. Visweswara Rao	Teerpu
