= Aatagadu =

- Theatrical release poster
- Directed by: T. Rama Rao
- Written by: Satyanand (dialogues)
- Screenplay by: M. D. Sundaram
- Story by: M. D. Sundaram
- Produced by: G. Rajendra Prasad
- Starring: N. T. Rama Rao; Sridevi
- Cinematography: Kannappa
- Edited by: J. Krishna Swamy–Balu
- Music by: Chakravarthy
- Production company: Sri Venkateswara Movie Creations
- Release date: 24 April 1980
- Running time: 131 minutes
- Country: India
- Language: Telugu

Aatagadu (transl. Player) is a 1980 Indian Telugu-language action film, produced by G. Rajendra Prasad and directed by T. Rama Rao. It stars N. T. Rama Rao and Sridevi, with music composed by Chakravarthy.

== Cast ==
- N. T. Rama Rao as Gopi
- Sridevi as Vijaya
- Rao Gopala Rao as Gopal Rao
- Satyanarayana as Sangeeta Rao
- Allu Ramalingaiah as Papa Rao
- Jaggayya as Ramaiah / Aggi Ramudu
- Prabhakar Reddy as Dharma Rao
- Padmanabham as Kirai Kattula Rathaiah
- Nutan Prasad as Ragala Rangaiah
- Mikkilineni as Jagannatham
- Raavi Kondala Rao as Jailor Nageswara Rao
- Chalapathi Rao as Bhairava
- Jagga Rao as Thief
- Pushpalatha as Parvathi
- Jayamalini as an item number
- Attili Lakshmi as Lakshmi

== Soundtrack ==
Aatagadu

Film score by Chakravarthy
- Released: 1980
- Genre: Soundtrack
- Length: 20:46
- Label: SEA Records
- Producer: Chakravarthy

Chakravarthy chronology
Challenge Ramudu (1980)	Aatagadu (1980)	Superman (1980)

Music composed by Chakravarthy. Lyrics were written by Veturi.

S.No	Song title	Singers	length
1	"Cheema Kuttindhaa"	S. P. Balasubrahmanyam	4:20
2	"Chilakamma Gootilo"	S. P. Balasubrahmanyam, P. Susheela	2:45
3	"Guddhuthaa Nee Yavva"	S. P. Balasubrahmanyam, P. Susheela	3:04
4	"Jil Jil Jilebi"	S. P. Balasubrahmanyam, P.Susheela	4:28
5	"Nee Choopu"	Madhavpeddi Ramesh, S. P. Sailaja	2:47
6	"Eko Narayana"	S. P. Balasubrahmanyam, P.Susheela	3:22
