= Amarajeevi (1983 film) =

- Theatrical release poster
- Directed by: Jandhyala
- Screenplay by: Jandhyala
- Story by: Bheesetty Lakshmana Rao
- Produced by: Bhimavarapu Bhuchchi Reddy
- Starring: Akkineni Nageswara Rao; Jaya Prada
- Cinematography: S. Gopal Reddy
- Edited by: Gautam Raju
- Music by: K. Chakravarthy
- Production company: Jyothi Art Creations
- Release date: 19 August 1983
- Running time: 133 mins
- Country: India
- Language: Telugu

Amarajeevi is a 1983 Telugu-language romance film, produced by Bhimavarapu Bhuchchi Reddy under the Jyothi Art Creations banner and directed by Jandhyala. The film stars Akkineni Nageswara Rao, Jaya Pradha and music composed by Chakravarthy.

== Plot ==
Dr. Murali, a well-renowned eye specialist, harbors hatred towards women after being victimized by a girl named Savitri. Suddenly, a young woman named Lalitha enters his life, and he falls deeply for her. After that, to his dismal, Lalitha presents her wedding card, saying that she will marry a wise person, Madhu, and affirms herself as the elder sister of Savitri, who has made the play for deceiving her sister. Now, Murali rescues his old classmate Shekar's son from losing eyesight when he rues and reveals the truth. Murali & Savitri are sincere lovers; it begrudged Shekar as he aspires to possess her. So, he created a rift between them, leading to Savitri's death. Right now, Shekar also proclaims his sin before Lalitha when she decides to stop the marriage. But here, the wheel of fortune makes Madhu a close friend to Murali, so he convinces Lalitha and couples them. Soon after, Madhu spots the intimacy of Murali & Lalitha and suspects, which leads to turmoil in their marital life. During the plight, frustrated Madhu loses his eyesight in an accident when Murali donates his eyes to be extant, aggravating Madhu's suspicion and necks out Lalitha. Mentally disturbed, Latitha reaches Murali when he pleads before Madhu, but he is not ready to listen. After that, he learns the reality from Shekar, repents, and immediately rushes. By then, Murali consumes poison when Madhu requests a pardon from him and accepts Lalitha. Finally, the movie ends with Murali breathing his last in Lalitha's lap.

== Cast ==
- Akkineni Nageswara Rao as Dr. Murali
- Jaya Prada as Lalitha
- Sarath Babu as Madhu
- Narasimha Raju as Shekar
- Kanta Rao
- Nagesh as Babu
- Sakshi Ranga Rao
- Suthi Velu
- Dham
- Kota Srinivasa Rao
- Pandari Bai
- Harish Kumar
- Sumalatha as Savitri
- Sri Lakshmi
- Tilak

== Soundtrack ==
Amarajeevi

Film score by Chakravarthy
- Released: 1983
- Genre: Soundtrack
- Length: 27:11
- Producer: Chakravarthy

Chakravarthy chronology
Ramudu Kadu Krishnudu (1983)	Amarajeevi (1983)	Sri Ranga Neethulu (1983)

Music was composed by Chakravarthy. Lyrics were written by Veturi. Music was released on Audio Company.

S. No.	Song title	Singers	length
1	"Asurasandhyavela"	S. P. Balasubrahmanyam, P. Susheela	6:03
2	"Ela Gadapanu"	S. P. Balasubrahmanyam, S. Janaki	3:58
3	"Mallepoola Maa Raniki"	S. P. Balasubrahmanyam	4:20
4	"Love is Love"	S. P. Balasubrahmanyam, Anitha Reddy	4:59
5	"Odarpu Kanna"	S. P. Balasubrahmanyam, S. Janaki	4:24
6	"Cheyyani Neram"	S. P. Balasubrahmanyam	3:27

== Others ==
- VCDs and DVDs on - SANTOSH Videos, Hyderabad
