= K. Chakravarthy =

Indian composer

- Born: Kommineni Appa Rao; 8 September 1936; Ponnekallu, Madras Presidency, British India
- Died: 3 February 2002 (aged 65) Chennai, Tamil Nadu, India
- Occupation: Music director
- Years active: 1971–1999

K. Chakravarthy (born Kommineni Appa Rao; 8 September 1936 – 3 February 2002) was an Indian music director and actor who primarily worked in Telugu cinema. He made his debut in 1971 with Mooga Prema and went on compose music for over 1000 films, predominantly in Telugu language (884 films), followed by Kannada (60 films). He won two Nandi Awards.

== Personal life ==
Chakravarthi was born as Kommineni Appa Rao on 8 September 1936 in Ponnekallu, Guntur district of present-day Andhra Pradesh. He had three sons, including Sri Kommineni who was also a music director and a playback singer.

== Career ==
Chakravarthi learned classical vocal from Mahavadi Venkatappaiah. He formed a music troupe called Vinod Orchestra in Guntur and organised light music concerts. Mangapati of His Master's Voice identified his talent and invited him to Madras. His Master's Voice released two private records, which include "Kanna Nenoka Kala".

=== Film career ===
His first Telugu film, Mooga Prema, was released in 1971. It was his friend, K. Chatterjee, who kept faith in his talent and rechristened him as "Chakravarthy" from "Apparao", so that he will do justice to the Royal category in his profession. Ultimately, his creativity soared to new heights with more than 5000 song compositions to his credit. Before this film, he composed background music for a Hindi movie, in the titles of which, his name was wrongly mentioned as Chakravarthi, while it was actually Apparao then. Hence he decided to continue as Chakravarthy. Mooga Prema film was not a good hit at the box-office, Saradha (1973), gave him a good hit, but even after this film, he was not well recognized.

He is primarily known for his association with director K. Raghavendra Rao, scoring hit music for his films with N. T. Rama Rao. Since the release of Driver Ramudu (1979), their association yielded numerous commercial hits both in terms of music and collections. Most of his compositions predominantly featured the Kalyani raga as it was predominantly used owing to directors liking of the time.

In 1977, Yamagola was released and this was the great turning point of his career. In this N. T. Rama Rao movie directed by T. Rama Rao, he introduced a new trend with S. P. Balasubrahmanyam by making him sing with voice modulation close to the actor's voice. He composed "Aadave andaala surabhamini" song for movie Yamagola in "Raga" "Jaijaivanti" using his own style fast tempo making it a commercial success. With V. Madhusudhana Rao 1978 film Mallepoovu, he became an architect for musical extravaganza. He abstained from reproducing Dada's S. D. Burman tunes for the Hindi film Pyaasa, thus proving his mettle as an able composer and silencing critics from assigning him as a mass, commercial, and fast beat composer tag. His music score for the movie Khaidi (1983 film) provided much needed commercial break in the career for the actor Chiranjeevi and Director A. Kodandarami Reddy. His music for Neti Bharatam and Pratighatana proved vital for actress Vijayashanti stardom. He rendered nice popular compositions in Dasari Narayana Rao favourite ragas Shivaranjani and Bhupalam for the films Balipeetam, Premabhishekam (1981 film) and Srivari Muchatlu directed by him. Eventually, he contributed for Akkineni Nageswara Rao career growth as well. He composed music score for the film "Pasivadi Pranam" with electronic orchestration.

He very well knew about his limitations and excelled based on his intuitions and exemplary natural creativity. Critics agreed upon this, as he was hardly spending 30 minutes to compose a song. During the peak of his career, he was recording more than 5 songs per day and worked for 16 hrs each day. He realized his potential in folk music and intelligently blended it with classical ragas. He proved the fact that music is boundless and it is also mass entertainment, and not just pundits make any art worthy. He established unique style of his own. He was humble and down to earth and always respected and proclaimed K. V. Mahadevan as genius in contemporary musicians. He was composing music for him in the early days of his career, before 1970.

His main assistants, Krishna-Chakra duo remained loyal to him throughout his career, though once in a while they had their own scores. Raj-Koti duo assisted him for several years. M. M. Keeravani was also his assistant. He introduced several singers with talent to the industry. S. P. Sailaja with song "Nampalli tesan kadi raja lingo" from film "Erra Mallelu", Vandemataram Srinivas are notable singers introduced by him.

He was a dubbing artist and lent his voice in 600 movies. He also penned lyrics for a few songs. He was also a singer and acted in a few films.

== Death ==
Chakravarthy died on 3 February 2002, due to age related ailments.

== Filmography ==
- Mooga Prema (1971)
- Sharada (1973)
- Evariki Vaare Yamuna Teere (1974)
- Babu (1975)
- Cheekati Velugulu (1975)
- Teerpu (1975)
- Jebu Donga (1975)
- Balipeetam (1975)
- Yavvanam Katesindi (1976)
- Jyoti (1976)
- Raja (1976)
- Kalpana (1977)
- Aame Katha (1977)
- Yamagola (1977)
- Devathalara Deevinchandi (1977)
- Maa Iddari Katha (1977)
- Mallepoovu (1978)
- Mugguru Muggure (1978)
- Simha Garjana (1978)
- Padaharella Vayasu (1978)
- Pranam Khareedu (1978)
- Athani Kante Ghanudu (1978)
- Tayaramma Bangarayya (1979)
- Vetagadu (1979)
- Balina Guri (1979) (Kannada)
- Driver Ramudu (1979)
- Yedanthasthula Meda (1980)
- Challenge Ramudu (1980)
- Gharana Donga (1980)
- Aatagadu (1980)
- Superman (1980)
- Mosagadu (1980)
- Ram Robert Rahim (1980)
- Gopala Rao Gari Ammayi (1980)
- Yedanthasthula Meda (1980)
- Buchi Babu (1980)
- Rowdy Ramudu Konte Krishnudu (1980)
- Nippulanti Nijam (1980)
- Pandanti Jeevitam (1980)
- Sarada Ramudu (1980)
- Sardar Papa Rayudu (1980)
- Gaja Donga (1981)
- Jeevitha Ratham (1981)
- Jagamondi (1981)
- Kirayi Rowdylu (1981)
- Premabhishekam (1981)
- Viswaroopam (1981)
- Satyam Sivam (1981)
- Erra Mallelu (1981)
- Nyayam kavali (1981)
- Prema Kanuka (1981)
- Varalabbai (1981)
- Illalu (1981)
- Srivari Muchatlu (1981)
- Ooruki Monagadu (1981)
- Pakkinti Ammayi (1981)
- Maha Purushudu (1981)
- Kondaveeti Simham (1982)
- Justice Chowdary (1982)
- Devatha (1982)
- Nyaya Ellide (1982) (Kannada)
- Iddaru Kodukulu (1982)
- Pagadai Panirendu (1982) (Tamil)
- Idi Pellantara (1982)
- Prema Murthulu (1982)
- Yuvaraju (1982)
- Gopala Krishnudu (1982)
- Vamsha Gouravam (1982)
- Adrusthavantha (1982) (Kannada)
- Prathikaram (1982)
- Naa Desam (1982)
- Raaga Deepam (1982)
- Maga Maharaju (1983)
- Keralida Hennu (1983)
- Ramarajyamlo Bheemaraju (1983)
- Kirayi Kotigadu (1983)
- Adavi Simhalu (1983)
- Neti Bharatam (1983)
- Shakthi (1983)
- Gedda Maga (1983) (Kannada)
- Khaidi (1983)
- Sivudu Sivudu Sivudu (1983)
- Sri Ranga Neethulu (1983)
- Ramudu Kadu Krishnudu (1983)
- Maga Maharaju (1983)
- Amarajeevi (1983)
- Sangharshana (1983)
- Bobbili Brahmanna (1984)
- Swati (1984)
- Jagan (1984)
- Sukha Samsarakke Hanneradu Sutragalu (1984) (Kannada)
- Agni Gundam (1984)
- Illalu Priyuralu (1984)
- Khaidi (Kannada)
- Yuddham (1984)
- Koteeswarudu (1984)
- Sardar (1984)
- Tandava Krishnudu (1984)
- Anubandham (1984)
- Indiana Bharatha (1984) (Kannada)
- Goonda (1984)
- Kathanayakudu (1984)
- Danavudu (1984)
- Dandayaatra (1984)
- Bava Maradallu (1984)
- Chiranjeevi (1985)
- Sri Katna Leelalu (1985)
- America Alludu (1985)
- Pratighatana (1985)
- Bharyabhartala Bandham (1985)
- Ooriki Soggadu (1985)
- Dampatyam (1985)
- Devaalayam (1985)
- Vande Mataram (1985)
- Chattamtho Poratam (1985)
- Sravanthi (1985)
- Pattabhishekam (1985)
- Donga (1985)
- Mangalya Balam (1985)
- Puli (1985)
- Rakta Sindhuram (1985)
- Adavi Donga (1985)
- Agni Parvatam (1985)
- Mugguru Mithrulu (1985)
- Maharaju (1985)
- Palnati Simham (1985)
- Vijetha (1985)
- Vajrayudham (1985)
- Krishna Garadi (1986)
- Vikram (1986)
- Punyasthree (1986)
- Khaidi Rudrayya (1986)
- Veta (1986)
- Kaliyuga Pandavulu (1986)
- Repati Pourulu (1986)
- Aranya Kaanda (1986)
- Sravana Meghalu (1986)
- Ide Naa Samadhanam (1986)
- Kaliyuga Krishnudu (1986)
- Chantabbai (1986)
- Kondaveeti Raja (1986)
- Jeevana Poratam (1986)
- Deshoddharakudu (1986)
- Nippulanti Manishi (1986)
- Sravana Sandhya (1986)
- Apoorva Sahodarulu (1986)
- Brahma Rudrulu (1986)
- Chanakya Sapatham (1986)
- Donga Mogudu (1987)
- Punnami Chandrudu (1987)
- Thandri Kodukula Challenge (1987)
- Prajaswamyam (1987)
- Kaboye Alludu (1987)
- Ajeyudu (1987)
- Dongodochadu (1987)
- Bhargava Ramudu (1987)
- President Gari Abbai (1987)
- Bharatamlo Arjunudu (1987)
- Sahasa Samrat (1987)
- Lorry Driver (1987) (Kannada)
- Muddayi (1987)
- Agni Putrudu (1987)
- Ummadi Mogudu (1987)
- Samsaram Oka Chadarangam (1987)
- Sardar Krishnama Naidu (1987)
- Satyam Shivam Sundaram (1987) (Kannada)
- Makutamleni Maharaju (1987)
- Chakravarthy (1987)
- Pasivadi Pranam (1987)
- Vijetha Vikram (1987)
- Athiratha Maharatha (1987) (Kannada)
- Bhanumati Gari Mogudu (1987)
- Jebu Donga (1987)
- Sakthi (1988) (Kannada)
- Donga Ramudu (1988)
- Nava Bharatha (1988) (Kannada)
- Chinababu (1988)
- Chuttalabbayi (1988)
- Chattamtho Chadarangam (1988)
- Station Master (1988)
- Brahma Puthrudu (1988)
- Aswaddhama (1988)
- Tiragabadda Telugubidda (1988)
- Agni Keratalu (1988)
- Manchi Donga (1988)
- Donga Pelli (1988)
- Yuddha Bhoomi (1988)
- Ramudu Bheemudu (1988)
- Shakthi (1988) (Kannada)
- Vijay (1989)
- Soggadi Kapuram (1989)
- Manmathe Raja (1989) (Kannada)
- Dorikithe Dongalu (1989)
- Parthudu (1989)
- Attaku Yamudu Ammayiki Mogudu (1989)
- Sarvabhoumudu (1989)
- Muthinantha Manushya (1989) (Kannada)
- Mamathala Kovela (1989)
- Bandhuvulostunnaru Jagratha (1989)
- Yamapasam (1989)
- Simha Swapnam (1989)
- Bhale Donga (1989)
- Gudachari 117 (1989)
- Ontari Poratam (1989)
- Prananiki Pranam (1990)
- Neti Dowrjanyam (1990)
- Aayudham (1990)
- Aggiramudu (1990)
- Chevvilo Puvvu (1990)
- Jayasimha (1990)
- Lorry Driver (1990)
- Talli Tandrulu (1991)
- Amma Rajinama (1991)
- Golmaal Govindam (1992)
- Bharatham (1992)
- Pellam Chebite Vinali (1992)
- Hendthi Helidare Helabeku (1992) (Kannada)
- Illu Pelli (1993)
- Ammoru (1995)
- Raja (1999) (Cameo role as a music director)
- Lahiri Lahiri Lahirilo (2002) (Actor- Character 'Punju Raju')
- Pratibimbalu (2022)

== Awards ==
Nandi Awards

- Best Music Director - Neti Bharatam (1983)
- Best Music Director - Sravana Meghalu (1986)
