= Aggiramudu =

- Theatrical release poster
- Directed by: S. S. Ravichandra
- Written by: Paruchuri Brothers
- Screenplay by: S. S. Ravichandra
- Produced by: M. Krishna & Shekar
- Starring: Venkatesh; Gautami; Amala
- Cinematography: S. Gopal Reddy
- Edited by: Kotagiri Venkateswara Rao
- Music by: Chakravarthy
- Production company: Sri Raghavendra Pictures
- Release date: 17 April 1990
- Running time: 140 minutes
- Country: India
- Language: Telugu

Aggiramudu is a 1990 Telugu-language film directed by S. S. Ravichandra and produced by M. Krishna and Shekar under the Sri Raghavendra Pictures banner. Venkatesh is in a dual role, Gautami and Amala played the lead roles. Music was composed by Chakravarthy.

== Cast ==
- Venkatesh as Aggi Ramudu & Vijay (Dual role)
- Gautami as Malli
- Amala as Manasa
- Sharada as Justice Janaki Devi
- Satyanarayana as Sarpabhushan Rao
- Allu Ramalingaiyah as Tatarao
- Kota Srinivasa Rao as Mental Doctor
- Babu Mohan as Bhuvanagiri Babji
- Sarath Babu as Ram Mohan
- Narra Venkateswara Rao as Inspector
- Chalapathi Rao as Sasibhushan Rao
- Pradeep Shakthi as Phanibhushan Rao
- Bhimeswara Rao as Bank Manager
- Chidathala Appa Rao
- Dham
- Jayalalitha as Saroja
- Hema as Manasa's friend
- Nirmalamma

== Soundtrack ==
Aggiramudu

Soundtrack album by Chakravarthy
- Released: 1990
- Genre: Soundtrack
- Length: 21:34
- Label: Cauvery Audio
- Producer: Chakravarthy

Chakravarthy chronology
Ayudham (1990)	Aggiramudu (1990)	'Lorry Driver' (1990)

Music Composed by Chakravarthy. Music released on Cauvery Audio Company.

No.	Title	Lyrics	Singer(s)	Length
1.	"Thagilithe Kopam"	Veturi	S. P. Balasubrahmanyam, S. Janaki	4:00
2.	"Haayile Haayile"	Sirivennela Sitarama Sastry	Mano, S. Janaki	4:50
3.	"Mallesa Maava Lagayinchara"	Veturi	S. P. Balasubrahmanyam, S. Janaki	4:36
4.	"Savaalu Chestaava"	Sirivennela Sitarama Sastry	Mano, S. Janaki	4:00
5.	"Srungaara Thailaala"	Veturi	S. P. Balasubrahmanyam, S. Janaki	4:08
Total length:				21:34
