= Viswaroopam (1981 film) =

- Theatrical release poster
- Directed by: Dasari Narayana Rao
- Written by: Dasari Narayana Rao
- Produced by: K. Bhanu Prasad; Kosaraju (Presents)
- Starring: N. T. Rama Rao; Jayasudha
- Cinematography: K.S.Mani
- Edited by: Kotagiri Gopala Rao
- Music by: Chakravarthy
- Release date: 25 July 1981
- Running time: 126 mins
- Country: India
- Language: Telugu

Viswaroopam is 1981 Telugu-language philosophical film, produced by K. Bhanu Prasad under the Kavi Ratna Movies banner and directed by Dasari Narayana Rao. It stars N. T. Rama Rao, Jayasudha and music composed by Chakravarthy. The film was a flop at the box office.

== Plot ==
The film begins in a town where two malice, Anna Rao & Gunna Rao, always compete for the city Municipal Chairman post. They also make their children Prasad Babu & Eswar Rao move in their footsteps and create much turbulence in college. In that dilemma, a new lecturer, Viswam, a good Samaritan, joins, eradicates dirty politics, and reforms his students. Parallelly, the municipality notifies elections, so Anna Rao & Gunna Rao approach Viswam to seek his help as student power is in his hands, but he refuses. Now, all the students pursue Viswam to contest, and with their aid, he triumphs. Whereat begrudged Anna Rao & Gunna Rao slaughter Viswam and disappear his body. Surprisingly, Viswam's soul appears to his students, which guides and shows them his identical kind-hearted goon, Chittaiah. At Present, Prasad Babu & Eswar Rao request recoups as Viswam by civilizing. From there, he counterstrikes' the black guards. Meanwhile, the area is always affected by floods, which kill hundreds of lives. Hence, Chittaiah decided to contract a dam per Viswam's ambition. Here, Anna Rao & Gunna Rao create many obstacles, and the government denies its support. Yet, Chittaiah unites the students, motivates the public, and completes the dam. So, the miscreants' cabal to blast it, but Viswam's soul directs the student who protects it. At last, Chittaiah ceases the baddies and surrenders to the Police. Finally, the movie ends happily, with Viswam's soul peacefully mingling in the universe.

== Cast ==
- N. T. Rama Rao as Viswam & Chittaiah (dual role)
- Jayasudha as Chukka
- Rao Gopala Rao as Anna Rao
- Satyanarayana as Gunna Rao
- Allu Ramalingaiah as Lecturer Ramalingaiah
- Mikkilineni as Principal
- Prasad Babu as Prasad
- Eeswar Rao as Eeswar Rao
- Hari Prasad as Hari Prasad
- R. Narayana Murthy as Murthy
- Ambika as Mallika
- Sukumari as Malathamma
- Subhashini as Revathi
- Anitha

== Soundtrack ==
Viswaroopam

Film score by Chakravarthy
- Released: 1981
- Recorded: 27:46
- Genre: Soundtrack
- Label: SEA Records
- Producer: Chakravarthy

Chakravarthy chronology
Satyam Shivam (1981)	Viswaroopam (1981)	Kondaveeti Simham (1981)

Music composed by Chakravarthy. Music released SEA Records Audio Company.

S. No.	Song title	Lyrics	Singers	length
1	"Nutiko Kotiko"	Dasari Narayana Rao	S. P. Balasubrahmanyam, P. Susheela	4:29
2	"Kechu Kechu Pitta"	Kosaraju	S. P. Balasubrahmanyam, P. Susheela	4:16
3	"Kanulu Chalavu"	Rajasri	S. P. Balasubrahmanyam, P. Susheela	4:38
4	"Naa Ranga Saranga"	Veturi	S. P. Balasubrahmanyam, P. Susheela	4:28
5	"Evadikante Takkuvara"	Kosaraju	S. P. Balasubrahmanyam	3:58
6	"Yuvakullara Levandi"	Dasari Narayana Rao	S. P. Balasubrahmanyam	5:57
