= Ponnekallu =

- Village
- Interactive map of Ponnekallu
- Location in Andhra Pradesh, India
- Coordinates: 16.4062°N 80.4010°E
- Country: India
- State: Andhra Pradesh
- District: Guntur
- Mandal: Tadikonda

Government
  - Type: Panchayati raj
  - Body: Ponnekallu gram panchayat

Area
  - Total: 1,546 ha (3,820 acres)

Population (2011)
  - Total: 9,703
  - Density: 627.6/km^{2} (1,626/sq mi)

Languages
  - Official: Telugu
- Time zone: UTC+5:30 (IST)
- PIN: 522018
- Area code: +91–8663
- Vehicle registration: AP
- Lok Sabha constituency: Guntur
- Assembly constituency: Tadikonda

Ponnekallu is a village in Guntur district of the Indian state of Andhra Pradesh. It is located in Tadikonda mandal of Guntur revenue division.It is situated approximately 18 kilometres (11 mi) from Guntur. It forms a part of Andhra Pradesh Capital Region.

== Government and politics ==
Ponnekallu gram panchayat is the local self-government of the village. It is divided into wards and each ward is represented by a ward member. The ward members are headed by a Sarpanch. It falls under Tadikonda assembly constituency in the Guntur lok sabha constituency in the state of Andhra Pradesh.

== Demographics ==
As of the 2011 Census of India, Ponnekallu had a total population of 9,703 across 2,755 households.

Demographics (2011 Census)
Parameter	Count
Total Population	9,703
Male	4,749
Female	4,954
Literates	5,512

== Economy and infrastructure ==
Agriculture is the primary occupation in Ponnekallu. Civic infrastructure includes a Primary Health Centre (PHC), a government veterinary hospital, Anganwadi centers, and a village library. Piped drinking water and electricity grids serve domestic and agricultural needs.

== Notable people ==
- K. Chakravarthy (Kommineni Apparao, 1936–2002) – South Indian film music composer.
- Kommineni Seshagiri Rao – Telugu film actor and director.
- Sri (Kommineni Srinivasa Chakravarthy, 1966–2015) – Telugu film music composer and playback singer.

== Transport and connectivity ==
Ponnekallu is connected by road to Guntur (approx. 14–18 km) and the state capital region of Amaravati. The Andhra Pradesh State Road Transport Corporation (APSRTC) operates daily bus services linking the village with Guntur, Tadikonda, and surrounding rural centers.

- Rail: The nearest major railway junction is Guntur Junction railway station (station code: GNT), located approximately 18 kilometres (11 mi) away.
- Air: The nearest commercial airport is Vijayawada International Airport (IATA: VGA), situated approximately 55 kilometres (34 mi) northeast in Gannavaram.
- Postal Services: The village has a branch post office under the Guntur Postal Division with PIN code 522018.

== Nearby villages ==
Ponnekallu is bounded by several prominent rural settlements within the Tadikonda mandal:

- Lam
- Bandarupalle
- Mothadaka
- Ravela
- Damarapalle

== Agriculture ==
Situated in the fertile black cotton soil region of the lower Krishna River basin, the local economy relies on both rainfed and irrigated agriculture. Key crops cultivated in and around Ponnekallu include:

- Commercial crops: Red chillies, cotton, and tobacco
- Food grains & pulses: Rice (paddy), black gram, and maize

== Census and identification codes ==
For government administration and mapping census data, the following identifiers apply:

- Census Village Code: 590000
- Gram Panchayat Code: 200800

== See also ==
- List of villages in Guntur district
