= Asha Jyoti =

- Poster
- Directed by: Dasari Narayana Rao
- Written by: Raj Baldev Raj (Dialogue Director)
- Story by: Dasari Narayana Rao
- Based on: Srivari Muchatlu (1981)
- Produced by: Kovai Chezhiyan
- Starring: Rajesh Khanna; Rekha; Reena Roy
- Edited by: B. Krishna Raju
- Music by: Laxmikant-Pyarelal
- Release date: 25 May 1984
- Running time: 130 minutes
- Country: India
- Language: Hindi

Asha Jyoti is a 1984 Hindi film starring Rajesh Khanna, Rekha, Reena Roy in lead roles. The film was directed by Dasari Narayana Rao, who had also directed Aaj Ka M.L.A. Ram Avtar with Khanna in the lead role and music was given by Laxmikant-Pyarelal. The film is remake of Telugu Movie Srivari Muchatlu (1981).

== Plot ==
Ramesh Chander (Om Shivpuri), a businessman, wants his musician son Deepak (Rajesh Khanna) to marry his childhood friend Asha (Rekha), but Deepak is not interested. In Kashmir, Deepak falls in love with one of his fans, a dancer named Jyoti (Reena Roy), informs his parents by telegram. Deepak promises to pay off the debts owed by Jyoti's father. On reaching Bombay Deepak finds out that father has committed suicide due to bankruptcy and expressed a last wish that his second wife and daughter be taken care of. Deepak is delayed in Bombay and is unable to return to Kashmir.

In Kashmir, Hukamchand (Roopesh Kumar) threatens Jyoti and her father of grave danger if they are unable to repay them money they owe him. When Deepak does arrive at Jyoti's house, her father lies to him that Jyoti has married Hukamchand. A heart-broken Deepak returns to Bombay.

Badri Prasad (Madan Puri), a rich friend of Ramesh Chander bails Deepak out from bankruptcy and prevents the creditors from filing a suit against Deepak and auctioning off his bungalow. Feeling indebted Deepak agrees to marry Badri Prasad's daughter Asha.

During the wedding, Deepak notices a woman who resembling Jyoti. He finds out that Jyoti is not married to Hukamchand. Jyoti has come to Bombay in search of Deepak and tells him that she is the mother of Deepak's child. Deepak decides to end his marriage with Asha but Jyoti requests Deepak to e a loyal husband of Asha. Jyoti is willing to bring up her child as a single mother.

Jyoti soon becomes a popular dance teacher, Asha starts learning dance from her, and the two become close friends. Asha discloses that her husband does not love her. When Jyoti visits Asha's home and learns of her identity she requests Deepak to be a true husband to Asha.

Asha learns that Jyoti and Deepak were lovers before her marriage and initially suspects they are having an affair. On learning the truth, she decides to sacrifice her life. Unknown to her, Jyoti would have made the same decision, leaving Deepak all alone.

== Cast ==
- Rajesh Khanna as Deepak Chander
- Rekha as Asha
- Reena Roy as Jyoti
- Asrani as Mauji Lal
- Roopesh Kumar as Hukamchand
- Madan Puri as Badri Prasad
- Om Shivpuri as Ramesh Chander

== Music ==
Lyricist: Anjaan

Song	Singer
"Neele Ambar Ke Do Naina"	Kishore Kumar
"Teri Payal Ki Jhankar Chhed Gayi Aise Man Ke Tar"	Kishore Kumar, Anuradha Paudwal
"Mehboob Se Mehbooba Mil Gayi"	Kishore Kumar, Asha Bhosle
"Chikna Chikna, Yaar Mera"	Asha Bhosle
"Aayi Milan Ki Woh" (Happy)	Asha Bhosle
"Aayi Milan Ki Woh" (Sad)	Asha Bhosle
