= Inspector Pratap =

- Theatrical release poster
- Directed by: Muthyala Subbaiah
- Written by: M. V. S. Haranatha Rao (dialogues)
- Screenplay by: Muthyala Subbaiah
- Story by: Krishna Chitra Unit
- Produced by: Y. Anilbabu
- Starring: Nandamuri Balakrishna; Vijayashanti
- Cinematography: Nandamuri Mohana Krishna
- Edited by: Gautham Raju
- Music by: Chakravarthy
- Production company: Krishna Chitra
- Release date: 15 January 1988
- Running time: 149 minutes
- Country: India
- Language: Telugu

Inspector Pratap is a 1988 Telugu-language action film, produced by Y. Anilbabu under the Krishna Chitra banner and directed by Muthyala Subbaiah. It stars Nandamuri Balakrishna and Vijayashanti with music composed by Chakravarthy. The film was recorded as a hit at the box office.

== Plot ==
The film begins in a town where a spirited cop, Pratap, is newly deputed and swears to protect the integrity & sovereignty of the nation. Ramanatham, an artful Advocate, Pratap's elder, brings him. Yet, he reveres him & sister-in-law Janaki and dotes on their kid Baby. Pratap takes charge when he acquaints and darlings a spirited girl, Chukka, who runs a tea stall opposite his station. Besides, Viswaroopam is malignant and undertakes malpractice as rectitude. Pratap antagonizes him, and the battle erupts. Once, he red-handedly apprehends his roguish son Raakhi, but he escapes with the fake alibis created by Ramanatham when a rift arises between the siblings. Simultaneously, Kranti & his faction of rebels take up arms against Viswaroopam. But he counterfeits them for his crimes as dacoits. Now, Pratap has charged to grab them.

Meanwhile, Viswaroopam ruses by clutching Ramanatham as his business ally and fixes his Baby's alliance with Raakhi; as a result, Pratap quits along with Janaki & Baby because they oppose it. Following this, Pratap catches hold of Kranti when he knows that Chukka is his sister. Plus, Kranti & men are not guilty. The actual owl is Viswaroopam when Pratap house arrests them to get the truth. Janaki showers concern and affection to them. After a while, Pratap ascertains the actuality and associates them with him. Parallelly, Janaki afflicts cancer and must quickly go through surgery for which a tidy sum is compulsory. Pratap denies Ramanatham's aid and gains the amount by endangering his life. At that time, tragically, Baby is molested by Raakhi when Ramanatham freaks out, and the knaves kick him out. Accordingly, he attempts suicide when Pratap bars, boosts up his courage and mingles him. They all declare an ultimatum to Viswaroopam, step-by-step, collapse his domain. Finally, Pratap publicly uncovers Viswaroopam's diabolic shade, proving that Kranti is innocent. Finally, the movie ends with the government honoring Inspector Pratap.

== Cast ==
- Nandamuri Balakrishna as Inspector Pratap
- Vijayashanti as Chukka
- Satyanaryana as Viswarupam
- Jaggayya as Commissioner
- Gollapudi Maruthi Rao as Lawyer Ramanatham
- Rallapalli as Narahari
- Giri Babu as Murahari
- Sarath Babu as Kranthi
- Narra Venkateswara Rao as C.I.
- Chalapathi Rao as Pakir
- Nizhalgal Ravi as Ramki
- Prasad Babu as Prasad
- P. J. Sarma as I.G.
- Bhemiswara Rao as Jaganatham
- Suthi Velu as Constable Rangaiah
- Potti Prasad
- Chitti Babu
- Ramana Reddy
- CH Krishna Murthy as Constable
- Eeswar Rao
- Vidyasagar
- Srividya as Janaki
- Varalakshmi as Baby
- Mucharlla Aruna
- Y. Vijaya

== Soundtrack ==
Inspector Pratap

Film score by Chakravarthy
- Released: 1987
- Genre: Soundtrack
- Length: 24:24
- Label: LEO Audio
- Producer: Chakravarthy

Chakravarthy chronology
Bhanumati Gari Mogudu (1988)	Inspector Pratap (1987)	Donga Ramudu (1988)

The music was composed by Chakravarthy. The music was released on LEO Audio Company.

S. No.	Song title	Lyrics	Singers	length
1	"Alaa Choodaboku"	C. Narayana Reddy	S. P. Balasubrahmanyam, S. Janaki	4:14
2	"Ninnu Yaado Choosina"	Jaladi	S. P. Balasubrahmanyam, P. Susheela	4:04
3	"Ranga Ranga"	Jaladi	S. P. Balasubrahmanyam, P. Susheela	3:50
4	"Thuntari Vaada"	Veturi	P. Susheela	3:59
5	"Hey Thagubothunayala"	Jaladi	S. P. Balasubrahmanyam	4:09
6	"Takadhim"	Jaladi	S. P. Balasubrahmanyam, P. Susheela	4:08
