= Bhanumati Gari Mogudu =

- Theatrical release poster
- Directed by: A. Kodandarami Reddy
- Screenplay by: Paruchuri Brothers; A. Kodandarami Reddy
- Story by: P. Kalaimani
- Produced by: D. V. S. Raju
- Starring: Nandamuri Balakrishna; Vijayashanti
- Cinematography: Nandamuri Mohana Krishna
- Edited by: K. Babu Rao
- Music by: Chakravarthy
- Production company: D.V.S. Enterprises
- Release date: 18 November 1987
- Running time: 145 minutes
- Country: India
- Language: Telugu

Bhanumati Gari Mogudu (transl. Bhanumati's husband) is a 1987 Indian Telugu-language comedy film, produced by D. V. S. Raju under the D.V.S. Enterprises banner and directed by A. Kodandarami Reddy. It stars Nandamuri Balakrishna, Vijayashanti, and music composed by Chakravarthy. Kalaimani, directed Tamil remake of the film Therkathi Kallan (1988).

== Cast ==
- Nandamuri Balakrishna as Jayakrishna
- Vijayashanti as Bhanumati
- Aswini as Gowri
- Ranganath as Inspector
- Giri Babu as Raghava
- Sudhakar as Baddikotu Pakir
- Rajesh as Mukunda
- Paruchuri Venteswara Rao as Director
- Nagesh as Lawyer Chinta Singinadham
- Suthi Velu as Lawyer Kodal Rao
- Ramana Reddy as Swamy
- Mallikarjuna Rao as Sarpanch
- K. K. Sarma as Production Manager
- Chidatala Appa Rao as Appa Rao
- Jagga Rao as Subbaiah
- P. J. Sarma as Public Prosecutor
- Bhimeswara Rao as Bank Manager
- Vankayala Satyanarayana as Public Prosecutor
- Mucharlla Aruna as Rani
- Pushpalata as Jayakrishna's mother
- Nirmalamma as Bhanumathi's aunt

== Soundtrack ==
Bhanumati Gari Mogudu

Film score by Chakravarthy
- Released: 1987
- Genre: Soundtrack
- Length: 21:02
- Label: Saptaswar Audio
- Producer: Chakravarthy

Chakravarthy chronology
President Gari Abbai (1987)	Bhanumati Gari Mogudu (1987)	Inspector Pratap (1988)

Music was composed by Chakravarthy, and lyrics were written by Veturi. Music was released by Saptaswar Audio Company.

S. No.	Song title	Singers	length
1	"Bhanumathi Pelli Neede"	S. P. Balasubrahmanyam	4:09
2	"Kattukunna Mogude"	S. P. Balasubrahmanyam, S. Janaki	4:11
3	"Mallepoovu"	S. P. Balasubrahmanyam, S. Janaki	4:07
4	"Jogilangu Jogilangu"	S. P. Balasubrahmanyam, P. Susheela	4:13
5	"Vayyaram Adigindi"	S. P. Balasubrahmanyam, P. Susheela	4:22
