= Tiragabadda Telugubidda =

Indian Telugu movie

- Theatrical release poster
- Directed by: A. Kodandarami Reddy
- Written by: Paruchuri Brothers (story / dialogues)
- Screenplay by: A. Kodandarami Reddy
- Produced by: Nandamuri Harikrishna
- Starring: Nandamuri Balakrishna; Bhanupriya
- Cinematography: Nandamuri Mohana Krishna
- Edited by: Vemuri Ravi
- Music by: Chakravarthy
- Production company: Tejaswi Productions
- Release date: 11 May 1988
- Running time: 129 minutes
- Country: India
- Language: Telugu

Tiragabadda Telugubidda (transl. Rebellious Telugu son) is a 1988 Indian Telugu-language action film, produced by Nandamuri Harikrishna under the Tejaswi Productions banner and directed by A. Kodandarami Reddy. It stars Nandamuri Balakrishna, Bhanupriya and music composed by Chakravarthy.

== Cast ==
- Nandamuri Balakrishna as Inspector Ravi Teja
- Bhanupriya as Padma
- Rao Gopal Rao as Mayor Sisupala Rao
- Jaggayya as Justice Jaganatha Rao
- Nutan Prasad as Dr. Chathurvedi
- Giri Babu as Brahmanandam
- P. L. Narayana as Dasaradharamaiah
- Chalapathi Rao as Ramudu
- Bhimeswara Rao as I.G.
- Rajesh as Phani
- KK Sarma as Priest
- Ramana Reddy as Pakiru
- Chitti Babu as Phani's friend
- Jeevita Rajashekar as Jhansi
- Varalakshmi as Rupa
- Annuja as Kuchala Kumari
- Anitha as Ravi Teja's mother
- Sujatha as Sulochana
- Ragini as Sishipal Rao's wife
- Nirmalamma as Tulasamma
- Telangana Shakuntala as Brothel owner (Uncredited Role)
- Babu Mohan

== Soundtrack ==
Tiragabadda Telugubidda

Film score by Chakravarthy
- Released: 1988
- Genre: Soundtrack
- Length: 21:29
- Label: LEO Audio
- Producer: Chakravarthy

Chakravarthy chronology
Donga Ramudu (1988)	Tiragabadda Telugubidda (1988)	Bharatamlo Bala Chandrudu (1988)

Music was composed by Chakravarthy and released by LEO Audio Company. Lyrics were written by Veturi.

S. No.	Song title	Singers	length
1	"Neevu Visaraku Vala"	S. P. Balasubrahmanyam, P. Susheela	3:54
2	"Pedda Pedda Kalla"	S. P. Balasubrahmanyam, S. Janaki	4:42
3	"One Day Cricket"	S. P. Balasubrahmanyam, P. Susheela	4:14
4	"Oyammo Idhi Evvare"	S. P. Balasubrahmanyam, S. Janaki	4:25
5	"Vennelo Kasindi"	S. P. Balasubrahmanyam, P. Susheela	4:14
