= Ramudu Kadu Krishnudu =

- Theatrical release poster
- Directed by: Dasari Narayana Rao
- Written by: Dasari Narayana Rao
- Produced by: N. R. Anuradha Devi
- Starring: Akkineni Nageswara Rao; Jayasudha; Radhika
- Cinematography: V. S. R. Swamy
- Edited by: B. Krishnam Raju
- Music by: Chakravarthy
- Production company: Lakshmi Films Combines
- Release date: 25 March 1983
- Running time: 146 mins
- Country: India
- Language: Telugu

Ramudu Kadu Krishnudu (transl. Not Rama, Krishna) is a 1983 Telugu-language drama film, produced by N. R. Anuradha Devi under the Lakshmi Films Combines banner, and directed by Dasari Narayana Rao. The film stars Akkineni Nageswara Rao, Jayasudha, Radhika and music composed by Chakravarthy. The film was recorded as a Super Hit at the box office.

== Cast ==
- Akkineni Nageswara Rao as Ramu & Krishna (Dual role)
- Jayasudha as Satya
- Radhika as Sarada
- Rao Gopal Rao as Gopal Rao
- Satyanarayana as Bahadoor Appa Rao
- Allu Ramalingaiah as Lingam
- Prabhakar Reddy
- Giri Babu as Giri Babu
- Suryakantam as Kanthamma
- Rajasulochana as Radhamma
- Jayanthi as Varalamma
- Sukumari as Lakshmi
- Jayamalini as Jayamma
- Mamatha as Mamatha

== Soundtrack ==
Ramudu Kadu Krishnudu

Film score by Chakravarthy
- Released: 1983
- Genre: Soundtrack
- Length: 25:19
- Label: AVM Audio
- Producer: Chakravarthy

Chakravarthy chronology
Manishiko Charitra (1983)	Ramudu Kadu Krishnudu (1983)	Amarajeevi (1983)

Music composed by Chakravarthy. Lyrics were written by Dasari Narayana Rao. The song Oka Laila Kosam in the movie is a blockbuster and it was remixed in its 2014 self-titled film starring Akkineni Nageswara Rao grandson Naga Chaitanya. Music released on AVM Audio Company.

S. No.	Song title	Singers	length
1	"Oka Laila Kosam"	S. P. Balasubrahmanyam, P. Susheela	5:27
2	"Andhamanthaa Aragadheesi"	S. P. Balasubrahmanyam, P. Susheela	4:22
3	"Chusaaka Ninu Chusaaka"	S. P. Balasubrahmanyam, P. Susheela	4:24
4	"Manchu Muthyaanivo"	S. P. Balasubrahmanyam	4:00
5	"Oka Chetha Thaali"	S. P. Balasubrahmanyam, P. Susheela	4:20
6	"Annam Pettamandhi Amma"	P. Susheela	2:46
