= Jagannatakam =

- VCD cover
- Directed by: A. Mohan Gandhi
- Screenplay by: A. Mohan Gandhi
- Dialogues by: Paruchuri Brothers
- Story by: Paruchuri Brothers
- Produced by: Radha Krishna; Chalapathi Rao; Sharada (presents)
- Starring: Jagapathi Babu; Meena; Sharada
- Cinematography: D. Prasad Babu
- Edited by: Vemuri Ravi
- Music by: Vidyasagar
- Production company: R. C. Creations
- Release date: 3 July 1991
- Running time: 136 minutes
- Country: India
- Language: Telugu

Jagannathakam is a 1991 Telugu-language, drama film, produced by Radha Krishna, Chalapathi Rao under the R. C. Creations banner and directed by A. Mohan Gandhi. It stars Jagapathi Babu, Meena, Sharada and the music was composed by Vidyasagar.

== Cast ==
- Jagapathi Babu as Jagam
- Meena as Jhansi
- Sharada as Manikyamma
- Satyanarayana as Balakotaiah
- Anand as Prabhakar
- Narra Venkateswara Rao as Parameswara Rao
- Chalapathi Rao as Yerra Subbaiah
- Prasad Babu as Krishna Rao
- Ravi Shankar as Chakarvathy
- Rajeevi as Madhavi
- Easwari Rao as Neela
- Jayalalita as Lanka Papa
- Varalakshmi as Sarada
- Tatineni Rajeswari as Parameswara Rao's wife
- Anitha as Krishna's Rao's sister

== Soundtrack ==
Jagannatakam

Film score by Vidyasagar
- Released: 1991
- Genre: Soundtrack
- Length: 20:47
- Label: LEO Audio
- Producer: Vidyasagar

Vidyasagar chronology
Parishkaram (1991)	Jagannatakam (1991)	Allari Pilla (1992)

Music was composed by Vidyasagar and released by LEO Audio Company. Lyrics were written by Veturi.

No	Song title	Singers	Writer
1	"All Rounder"	K. S. Chithra, S. P. Balasubrahmanyam	Veturi Sundara Ramamurhty
2	"Khaleja"	K. S. Chithra, S. P. Balasubrahmanyam	Veturi Sundara Ramamurhty
3	"Choodi Ittaga"	K. S. Chithra	Veturi Sundara Ramamurhty
4	"Dash Dash"	K. S. Chithra, S. P. Balasubrahmanyam	Veturi Sundara Ramamurhty
5	"Jungle Jagguki"	S. P. Balasubrahmanyam	Veturi Sundara Ramamurhty
