= Gopala Krishnudu =

- Theatrical release poster
- Directed by: A. Kodandarami Reddy
- Written by: Satyanand
- Screenplay by: Satyanand; Satyamurthy
- Produced by: Bhimavarapu Bhuchchi Reddy
- Starring: Akkineni Nageswara Rao; Jayasudha; Radha
- Cinematography: P. S. Selvaraj
- Edited by: G. G. Krishna Rao
- Music by: Chakravarthy
- Production company: Jyothi Art Creations
- Release date: 29 June 1982
- Running time: 146 mins
- Country: India
- Language: Telugu

Gopala Krishnudu is a 1982 Telugu-language film, produced by Bhimavarapu Bhuchchi Reddy and directed by A. Kodandarami Reddy. It stars Akkineni Nageswara Rao, Jayasudha, Radha (in her Telugu debut) and music composed by Chakravarthy. The film was a remake of Tamil film Keezh Vaanam Sivakkum.

== Plot ==
Gopala Krishna, a tomcat, spends his life frolicking as the son of Dr. Murthy, a wealthy ophthalmologist who is unbeknownst to his son's actions. Once Gopi gets acquainted with a middle-class girl, Sujatha, he entices her, but in vain. She turns out to be the daughter of Murthy's sister, Kousalya, who detached from him years ago. Before dying, she entrusts Sujatha's responsibility to him. After reaching home, Sujatha realizes Gopi is her cousin. So, with a play, she reforms, knits him, and they lead a joyful life. Soon after, a blind girl, Radha, enters via Dr.Murthy, requesting him to recoup her vision to seek vengeance on her hoodwinker. Unfortunately, Gopi turns into him. At present, Murthy provides shelter to Radha, and she befriends Sujatha. As of now, tragically, Sujatha is diagnosed as terminally ill, which collapses Gopi and startled viewing Radha, who discerns him. She questions Murthy when he confesses guilt and is penalized by explaining Sujatha's condition. Here, Sujatha overhears the conversation. Finally, the movie ends with Sujatha uniting Gopi & Radha and breathing her last happily by donating her eyes to Radha.

== Cast ==
- Akkineni Nageswara Rao as Gopala Krishna & Dr. Murthy (dual role)
- Jayasudha as Sujatha
- Radha as Radha
- Jaggayya as Dr. Rao
- Allu Ramalingaiah as Vasanth
- Rama Prabha as Govindamma
- Sri Lakshmi
- Rajyalakshmi
- Subhashini
- Halam
- Athili Lakshmi as Lakshmi
- Jhansi
- Dubbing Janaki as Kousalya

== Soundtrack ==
Gopala Krishnudu

Film score by Chakravarthy
- Released: 1982
- Genre: Soundtrack
- Length: 24:43
- Producer: Chakravarthy

Chakravarthy chronology
Raaga Deepam (1982)	Gopala Krishnudu (1982)	Swayamvaram (1982)

Music composed by Chakravarthy. Lyrics were written by Veturi.

S.No	Song title	Singers	length
1	"Amma Chaatu Pillaadni"	S. P. Balasubrahmanyam	4:20
2	"Banthula Chemanthamma"	S. P. Balasubrahmanyam, P. Susheela	3:43
3	"Andala Raadhika"	S. P. Balasubrahmanyam, P. Susheela	4:07
4	"Gnaapakam Unnadhaa"	S. P. Balasubrahmanyam, P. Susheela	3:45
5	"Godari Gattanta"	S. P. Balasubrahmanyam, P. Susheela	4:20
6	"Gudilopali Dhaivamaa"	S. P. Balasubrahmanyam	4:28
