= Srivari Muchatlu =

- Movie poster
- Directed by: Dasari Narayana Rao
- Written by: Dasari Narayana Rao
- Produced by: N. R. Anuradha Devi
- Starring: Akkineni Nageswara Rao; Jaya Prada; Jayasudha
- Cinematography: P. S. Selvaraj
- Edited by: B. Krishnam Raju
- Music by: Chakravarthy
- Production company: Lakshmi Films Combines
- Release date: 1 January 1981
- Running time: 146 minutes
- Country: India
- Language: Telugu

Srivari Muchatlu is a 1981 Telugu-language drama film, produced by N. R. Anuradha Devi under the Lakshmi Films Combines banner and directed by Dasari Narayana Rao. The film stars Akkineni Nageswara Rao, Jaya Prada, Jayasudha and music composed by Chakravarthy. The film is remade in Hindi as Asha Jyoti (1984).

== Cast ==
- Akkineni Nageswara Rao as Gopi
- Jaya Prada as Radha
- Jayasudha as Priya
- Prabhakar Reddy as Chakrapani
- Allu Ramalingaiah
- K. V. Chalam
- P. J. Sarma
- Hari Prasad
- Rajasulochana
- Sukumari
- Kavitha
- Nirmalamma

== Soundtrack ==
Srivari Muchatlu

Film score by Chakravarthy
- Released: 1980
- Genre: Soundtrack
- Length: 21:29
- Label: AVM Audio
- Producer: Chakravarthy

Chakravarthy chronology
Pilla Zamindar (1980)	Srivari Muchatlu (1980)	Premabhishekam (1980)

Music composed by Chakravarthy. Lyrics were written by Dasari Narayana Rao. Music released on AVM Audio Company.

S. No.	Song title	Singers	length
1	"Akasam Musiresindhi"	S. P. Balasubrahmanyam, P. Susheela	3:06
2	"Kallaa Gajja"	S. P. Balasubrahmanyam, P. Susheela	4:11
3	"Udayakirana Rekhalo"	S. P. Balasubrahmanyam, S. Janaki	5:21
4	"Suryuni Okate Udayam"	S. P. Balasubrahmanyam	4:21
5	"Mukkapachlarani"	S. P. Balasubrahmanyam, P. Susheela	4:11
6	"Srivari Muchatlu"	P. Susheela	4:19
