= Maha Purushudu =

- Theatrical release poster
- Directed by: P. Lakshmi Deepak
- Written by: Jandhyala (dialogues)
- Screenplay by: P. Lakshmi Deepak
- Story by: Mahesh
- Produced by: V. Roshini
- Starring: N. T. Rama Rao; Jayasudha; Sujatha
- Cinematography: Kannappa
- Edited by: K. A. Marthand
- Music by: Chakravarthy
- Production company: Adithya Chitra
- Release date: 21 November 1981
- Running time: 144 mins
- Country: India
- Language: Telugu

Maha Purushudu (transl. Great Man) is a 1981 Telugu-language drama film, produced by V. Roshini under the Adithya Chitra banner and directed by P. Lakshmi Deepak. It stars N. T. Rama Rao, Jayasudha, Sujatha and music composed by Chakravarthy. The film which was stuck in development hell received cold response from the people and ended up as a box-office bomb.

== Cast ==
- N. T. Rama Rao as Vijay
- Jayasudha as Padma
- Sujatha as Lakshmi
- Murali Mohan as Murali
- Satyanarayana as Manmatha Rao
- Prabhakar Reddy as Lakshmipathi
- Padmanabham
- P. L. Narayana as Dharma Rao
- Eswara Rao
- Jagga Rao
- Suryakantham as Kanthamma
- Mamatha as Kanakam
- Jayamalini as item number

== Soundtrack ==
Maha Purushudu

Film score by Chakravarthy
- Released: 1981
- Genre: Soundtrack
- Label: SEA Records
- Producer: Chakravarthy

Chakravarthy chronology
Kondaveeti Simham (1981)	Maha Purushudu (1981)	Anuraga Devatha (1981)

Music composed by Chakravarthy. Music released by SEA Records Audio Company.

S. No.	Song title	Lyrics	Singers	length
1	"Sri Krishna"	C. Narayana Reddy	P. Susheela	1:17
2	"Mangammatta Kootura"	Veturi	S. P. Balasubrahmanyam, P. Susheela	3:44
3	"Tholi Saari"	Veturi	S. P. Balasubrahmanyam, P. Susheela	3:53
4	"Kovelalo Deepamla"	C. Narayana Reddy	S. P. Balasubrahmanyam	4:27
5	"Bonikottu Beram"	Veturi	S. P. Balasubrahmanyam, P. Susheela	3:32
6	"Chilakaluri Peta Chinnadaanni"	Gopi	S. P. Balasubrahmanyam, S. Janaki	4:50
7	"Prathi Vasantha Velalo"	C. Narayana Reddy	G. Anand, P. Susheela	4:29
