= Tandava Krishnudu =

- Theatrical release poster
- Directed by: P. Chandrasekhara Reddy
- Written by: Paruchuri Brothers (dialogues)
- Screenplay by: P. Chandrasekhara Reddy
- Story by: D. R. Chenna Reddy
- Produced by: B. Gopala Reddy
- Starring: Akkineni Nageswara Rao; Jaya Prada
- Cinematography: V. S. R. Swamy
- Edited by: V. Ankki Reddy
- Music by: Chakravarthy
- Production company: Krishna Art Creations
- Release date: 26 January 1984
- Running time: 138 mins
- Country: India
- Language: Telugu

Tandava Krishnudu is a 1984 Telugu-language drama film directed by P. Chandrasekhara Reddy. Produced by B. Gopala Reddy, the film stars Akkineni Nageswara Rao, Jaya Prada and music composed by Chakravarthy.

== Cast ==
- Akkineni Nageswara Rao as Chakravarthy
- Jaya Prada as Vani
- Satyanarayana as Bhanu Murthy
- Allu Ramalingaiah as Ramachandra Murthy
- Kanta Rao as Dhananjay Rao
- Gollapudi Maruti Rao as Gurrala Gurunatham
- Giri Babu as Seshagiri
- Rajendra Prasad as Raja
- Mikkilineni as Vani's grandfather
- Vankayala Satyanarayana as Doctor
- Ch. Krishna Murthy
- Nalinikanth as Varma
- Jaya Prakash Reddy as Principal
- Annapurna as Rajyalakshmi
- Mucherla Aruna as Seeta
- Athili Lakshmi as Parvathi
- Shyamala Gowri as Rani

== Soundtrack ==
Tandava Krishnudu

Film score by Chakravarthy
- Released: 1983
- Genre: Soundtrack
- Length: 28:02
- Producer: Chakravarthy

Chakravarthy chronology
Anubhandham (1984)	Tandava Krishnudu (1983)	Bava Maradallu (1984)

Music composed by Chakravarthy. Lyrics were written by Veturi.

S. No.	Song title	Singers	length
1	"Tatatarala Naa Desam"	S. P. Balasubrahmanyam	4:54
2	"Yalayalayala Golavundi"	S. P. Balasubrahmanyam, P. Susheela	6:07
3	"Love Me Allow Me"	S. P. Balasubrahmanyam, P. Susheela	4:30
4	"Entha Chusina"	S. P. Balasubrahmanyam, P. Susheela	4:07
5	"Navvara Navvara"	S. P. Balasubrahmanyam, S. Janaki	4:00
6	"Sodicheppaku Somavaramu"	P. Susheela, S. P. Sailaja	4:24

== Other ==
- VCDs and DVDs on - Universal Videos, SHALIMAR Video Company, Hyderabad
