= Bangaru Kanuka =

- Directed by: V. Madhusudhana Rao
- Written by: Acharya Aatreya (dialogues)
- Screenplay by: V. Madhusudhana Rao
- Produced by: Ravula Ankhaiah Gowd
- Starring: Akkineni Nageswara Rao; Sridevi; Sujatha
- Cinematography: P. S. Selva Raj
- Edited by: D. Venkataratnam
- Music by: Satyam
- Production company: Ravindra Films
- Release date: 2 April 1982
- Running time: 133 mins
- Country: India
- Language: Telugu

Bangaru Kanuka (transl. Golden Gift) is a 1982 Telugu-language romance film, produced by Ravula Ankhaiah Gowd under the Ravindra Films banner and directed by V. Madhusudhana Rao. It stars Akkineni Nageswara Rao, Sridevi, Sujatha, with music composed by Satyam. This movie is a remake of the Tamil movie Iru Malargal (1967).

== Cast ==
- Akkineni Nageswara Rao as Ramesh
- Sridevi as Roopa
- Sujatha as Shanti
- Gummadi
- Allu Ramalingaiah
- Ranganath
- P. J. Sharma
- Annapurna
- Krishnaveni

== Soundtrack ==
Bangaru Kanuka

Film score by Satyam
- Released: 1982
- Genre: Soundtrack
- Length: 28:15
- Label: EMI Columbia Audio
- Producer: Satyam

Satyam chronology
Krishnarjunulu (1982)	Bangaru Kanuka (1982)	Billa Ranga (1982)

Music composed by Satyam. Music released on EMI Columbia Audio Company.

S.No	Song title	Lyrics	Singers	length
1	"Mandarale Vikasinche"	Veturi	S. P. Balasubrahmanyam, P. Susheela	3:34
2	"Kasurukunna Kalladi"	Veturi	S. P. Balasubrahmanyam, P. Susheela	4:41
3	"Nadaka Hamsadhvani"	Veturi	S. P. Balasubrahmanyam, S. Janaki	6:28
4	"Nochina"	Acharya Aatreya	S. P. Balasubrahmanyam, S. Janaki, P. Susheela	4:39
5	"Emitoga Vundi"	Veturi	S. P. Balasubrahmanyam, P. Susheela	4:42
6	"Thaamara Puvvanti"	Veturi	S. P. Balasubrahmanyam, P. Susheela	4:11
