= Aswaddhama =

1988 Indian action film by B. Gopal

- Directed by: B. Gopal
- Written by: Paruchuri Brothers
- Produced by: Sekhar; M. Krishna
- Starring: Krishna; Vijayashanti; Nutan Prasad; Sarada; Mohan Babu
- Music by: Chakravarthy
- Production company: Sri Raghavendra Art Picture
- Release date: 28 July 1988
- Country: India
- Language: Telugu

Aswaddhama (also spelled as Aswathama) is a 1988 Indian Telugu-language action film written by Paruchuri Brothers and directed by B. Gopal starring Krishna in the title role alongside Vijayashanti, Nutan Prasad, Sarada and Mohan Babu. The film was produced by M. Krishna and Sekhar in the banner of Sri Raghavendra Art Picture.

The story follows a daring bus driver, Aswaddhama who after getting implicated in a false case by his evil master, Subrahmanyam, wages a war against injustice and in the process rises from rags to riches.

== Cast ==
Actor	Character
Krishna	Aswaddhama
Vijayashanti	Sudha
Nutan Prasad	Smasanam Subrahmanyam (SSS)
Sarada	Advocate Bhargavi
Mohan Babu	Sub Inspector Namalu
Jaggayya	Public Prosecutor Shankaram
Chalapathi Rao	Seth Kishanlal
Narra Venkateswara Rao	DSP Kumar
Rajesh	Veeru
Mucherla Aruna	Jyothi
Master Rajesh	Kiran
Raja	Satish
Varalakshmi	Lakshmi
P.J. Sarma	Judge

== Songs ==
The film's soundtrack album scored and composed by Chakravarthy consisted of 5 tracks.

- "O Jabbili"
- "Ashwathamakku"
- "Orandhagaada"
- "Andhaala Bomma"
- "Sigetti Kottamakku"

== Release and reception ==
The film was successful at the box office.

== Sources ==
1. Aswathama film info
