= Donga Ramudu (1988 film) =

- Theatrical release poster
- Directed by: K. Raghavendra Rao
- Written by: Paruchuri Brothers (story / dialogues)
- Screenplay by: K. Raghavendra Rao
- Produced by: Chalasani Gopi
- Starring: Nandamuri Balakrishna; Radha
- Cinematography: K. S. Prakash
- Edited by: D. Venkatratnam
- Music by: Chakravarthy
- Production company: Gopi Art Pictures
- Release date: 18 February 1988
- Running time: 136 minutes
- Country: India
- Language: Telugu

Donga Ramudu is a 1988 Telugu-language action film, produced Chalasani Gopi by under the Gopi Art Pictures banner and directed by K. Raghavendra Rao. It stars Nandamuri Balakrishna, Radha and music composed by Chakravarthy.

== Cast ==
- Nandamuri Balakrishna as Rama Krishna
- Radha as Ganga (Voice Dubbed by Durga)
- Mohan Babu as Lanka Eswara Rao
- Kanta Rao as Rama Krishna's paternal uncle
- Chandra Mohan as Kakani Krishnaiah
- Siva Krishna as Dharma Raju / Jaggu
- Chalapathi Rao as Bhanu Prakash
- P. L. Narayana as Simhadri
- Balaji as Bhanoji
- Vidya Sagar
- Jaya Bhaskar
- Pandari Bai as Rajyalakshmi
- Malashri as Durga
- Kuyili as Rani
- Y. Vijaya as Chitrangi Devi

== Soundtrack ==
Donga Ramudu

Film score by Chakravarthy
- Released: 1988
- Genre: Soundtrack
- Length: 25:40
- Label: LEO Audio
- Producer: Chakravarthy

Chakravarthy chronology
Inspector Pratap (1988)	Donga Ramudu (1988)	Tiragabadda Telugubidda (1988)

Music composed by Chakravarthy. Lyrics were written by Jonnavithhula Ramalingeswara Rao. Music released on LEO Audio Company.

S. No.	Song title	Singers	length
1	"Ammamma Ammamma"	S. P. Balasubrahmanyam, P. Susheela	3:39
2	"Cheyyi Veyyi Nadum"	S. P. Balasubrahmanyam, P. Susheela	4:23
3	"Loveliga Unnave"	S. P. Balasubrahmanyam, P. Susheela	4:31
4	"Asale Kasi Kasi"	S. P. Balasubrahmanyam, S. Janaki	4:42
5	"Taku Chiku Taku Chiku"	S. P. Balasubrahmanyam, P. Susheela, Mano	4:06
6	"Yamma Kottudu"	S. P. Balasubrahmanyam, P. Susheela	4:19

== Other ==
- VCDs and DVDs on - VOLGA Videos, Hyderabad
