= Teerpu =

- Theatrical release poster
- Directed by: U. Viswaswara Rao
- Screenplay by: U. Viswaswara Rao; Sri Sri
- Story by: Padmini Rajan
- Produced by: U. Viswaswara Rao
- Starring: N. T. Rama Rao; Savitri
- Cinematography: Mohana Krishna
- Edited by: Hanumantha Rao
- Music by: Chakravarthy
- Production company: Jothee International
- Release date: 2 October 1975
- Country: India
- Language: Telugu

Teerpu (transl. The Judgement) is a 1975 Indian Telugu-language legal drama film, produced and directed by U. Viswaswara Rao. The film stars N. T. Rama Rao and Savitri, with music composed by Chakravarthy. It was released on 1 October 1975.

== Cast ==
- N. T. Rama Rao
- Savitri
- Prabhakar Reddy
- Dhulipalla
- Mukkamala
- Prem Kumar
- Ranga Rao
- Manorajan
- Prasad
- Bose
- Benerjee
- Krishna Murthy
- Subba Rao
- Sujatha Bhagath
- Shyamala
- Sangeeta

== Production ==
Teerpu is the feature film debut of Sangeeta.

== Soundtrack ==
Music composed by Chakravarthy. Lyrics were written by U. Visweswara Rao.

Song title	Singers	length
"Good Night"	S. P. Balasubrahmanyam	3:02
"Chikapanta"	S. Janaki	3:14
"Vibhatha Veela"	P. Susheela	3:10
"Amma Yelokapu Devathavamma"	S. P. Balasubrahmanyam	3:06
"Seetamma Chachindi"	S. P. Balasubrahmanyam	3:00
