= Yuvaraju (1982 film) =

- Theatrical release poster
- Directed by: Dasari Narayana Rao
- Written by: Dasari Narayana Rao
- Produced by: Venkat Akkineni; Nagarjuna Akkineni
- Starring: Akkineni Nageswara Rao; Jayasudha; Sujatha
- Cinematography: V. S. R. Swamy
- Edited by: B. Krishnam Raju
- Music by: Chakravarthy
- Production company: Annapurna Studios
- Release date: 29 December 1982
- Running time: 137 mins
- Country: India
- Language: Telugu

Yuvaraju (transl. Prince) is a 1982 Telugu-language drama film, and written and directed by Dasari Narayana Rao, and produced by Venkat Akkineni, and Nagarjuna Akkineni on Annapurna Studios banner. Starring Akkineni Nageswara Rao, Jayasudha, Sujatha and music composed by Chakravarthy.

== Plot ==
Rajesh is a young & energetic guy who spends his life frolicking. Once acquainted with Dr. Karuna, who silently loves him and understands his ideologies, Rajesh walks to their estate, rescuing a girl named Aasha from the goons. Indeed, she is an amnesiac patient, of which he is unbeknownst when they crush and consummate. After that, they proceed to the city, where Aasha poses as the daughter of Puli Papa Rao in an alien state. So, Rajesh coordinates bridal connections through his father Ranga Subba Rao. Destiny makes them dear old friends, and Karuna as Puli Papa Rao, who too delightfully accepts. Just before the wedding, the truth is unwrapped, and Rajesh divulges the actuality when Karuna calls it off with a broken heart. Now, Rajesh moves in quest of Aasha till she regains her memory of whose true self is Jyothi and returns home. Hereupon, Rajesh sincerely seeks to retrieve their memories, but to no avail. Parallelly, Jyothi’s family fixes and performs her alliance with Murali. Ergo, devastated Rajesh, turns alcoholic. Thus, Karuna reforms him when he perceives her adoration and opts to get knitted. Soon after the nuptial, Aasha backs, recalling Rajesh and detecting herself pregnant. Heretofore, both Karuna & Aasha commit to sacrifice for one another when Rajesh says he cannot quit either of them and asks them to stay together. However, they hesitate for fear of society. At last, Rajesh convinces them not to forego their happiness and to face the club with courage. Finally, the movie ends happily with Rajesh fusing with two.

== Cast ==
- Akkineni Nageswara Rao as Rajesh
- Jayasudha as Aasha / Jyothi
- Sujatha as Dr. Karuna
- Prabhakar Reddy as Ranga Subba Rao
- Allu Ramalingaiah as Puli Papa Rao
- Padmanabham as Driver
- Murali Mohan as Mohan
- Sridhar as Ramakrishna
- Pushpalata as Rajesh's mother
- Mamatha as Musalamma
- K. Vijaya as Vijaya
- Dubbing Janaki as Doctor

== Soundtrack ==
Yuvaraju

Film score by Chakravarthy
- Released: 1982
- Genre: Soundtrack
- Length: 29:30
- Label: SEA Records
- Producer: Chakravarthy

Chakravarthy chronology
| Gopala Krishnudu (1982) | Yuvaraju (1982) | Amarajeevi (1983) |

Music composed by Chakravarthy. Lyrics were written by Dasari Narayana Rao. Music released on SEA Records Audio Company.

| S.No | Song title | Singers | length |
|---|---|---|---|
| 1 | Nari Nari Nadumamurari | S. P. Balasubrahmanyam | 6:15 |
| 2 | Andagadu | S. P. Balasubrahmanyam, P. Susheela | 4:40 |
| 3 | Nelalu Nindinattu | S. P. Balasubrahmanyam | 4:20 |
| 4 | Evaro Chepparu | S. P. Balasubrahmanyam, P. Susheela | 4:42 |
| 5 | Neelala Ningi | S. P. Balasubrahmanyam, P. Susheela | 4:45 |
| 6 | Evara Naluguru | S. P. Balasubrahmanyam | 4:38 |

== Others ==
- VCDs and DVDs on - VOLGA Videos, Hyderabad
