= Chuttalabbayi =

1988 Telugu film by Kodi Ramakrishna

- Directed by: Kodi Ramakrishna
- Written by: Satyanand (Dialogues)
- Produced by: N. Ramalingeswara Rao
- Starring: Krishna; Radha; Suhasini
- Cinematography: Lakshman Gore
- Edited by: Satyanarayana; Nageswara Rao
- Music by: K. Chakravarthy
- Production company: Ramprasad Art Movies
- Release date: 1988
- Country: India
- Language: Telugu

Chuttalabbayi (transl. Relative's Boy) is a 1988 Indian Telugu language film directed by Kodi Ramakrishna. It features Krishna, Radha and Suhasini in the lead roles. It was produced by N. Ramalingeswara Rao under Ramprasad Art Movies banner. K. Chakravarthy scored and composed the film's soundtrack album.

== Cast ==
- Krishna
- Radha
- Suhasini
- Nutan Prasad
- Subhalekha Sudhakar
- Prasad Babu
- Giribabu
- S. Varalakshmi as Kanakadurgamma
- Gollapudi Maruti Rao
- Nirmalamma
- Y. Vijaya
- Kalpana Rai

== Soundtrack ==
K. Chakravarthy scored and composed the film's soundtrack.

1. "Suvvi Suvvi" — S. P. B., S. Janaki
2. "Dashing Veerude" — Raj Sitaram
3. "Thaagi Mari" — S. P. B.,
4. "Edo Vunnadi" — S. P. B., S. Janaki
5. "Aate Sundhama" — Mano, K. S. Chitra, P. Susheela
6. "Ontarigunte" — S. P. B., S. Janaki
