= Chalapathi Rao =

Indian actor (1944–2022)

- Born: Tammareddy Chalapathi Rao; 8 May 1944; Baliparru, Madras Presidency, British India (now in Andhra Pradesh, India)
- Died: 24 December 2022 (aged 78); Hyderabad, Telangana, India
- Occupations: Film actor; producer
- Spouse: Indumaty
- Children: 3, including Ravi Babu

Tammareddy Chalapathi Rao (8 May 1944 – 24 December 2022) was an Indian actor and producer known for comedy and villainous roles in Telugu cinema. He acted in different roles in more than 600 films.

== Personal life and death ==
Rao hailed from Baliparru, Krishna district, Andhra Pradesh. His son Ravi Babu is an actor, director and producer in Telugu cinema.

Rao died from a heart attack on 24 December 2022, at the age of 78.

== Partial filmography ==
=== As actor ===
==== Films ====
1. Gudachari 116 (1966)
2. Sakshi (1967)
3. Sri Rama Katha (1969) as Indra
4. Buddhimantudu (1969)
5. Takkari Donga Chakkani Chukka (1969)
6. Kathanayakudu (1969)
7. Mayani Mamata (1970)
8. Pettandarulu (1970)
9. Sampoorna Ramayanam (1971) as Vayu
10. Adrusta Jathakudu (1971)
11. Chelleli Kapuram (1971)
12. Kalam Marindi (1972)
13. Muhammad bin Tughluq (1972)
14. Kathula Rathayya (1972) as Shamsher
15. Desoddharakulu (1973)
16. Andalaramudu (1973)
17. Doctor Babu (1973)
18. Tatamma Kala (1974)
19. Amma Manasu (1974)
20. Nippulanti Manishi (1974) as Anti-Corruption Bureau Official
21. Yamagola (1975)
22. Annadammula Anubandham (1975)
23. Manushulanta Okkate (1976)
24. Raaja (1976)
25. Yamagola (1977)
26. Daana Veera Soora Karna (1977)
27. Yuga Purushudu (1978)
28. Mugguru Muggure (1978)
29. Sahasavanthudu (1978) as Roberts
30. Driver Ramudu (1979)
31. Yugandhar (1979) as Chalapathi
32. Vetagadu (1979)
33. Sri Tirupati Venkateswara Kalyanam (1979)
34. Akbar Salim Anarkali (1979)
35. Yuvatharam Kadilindi (1980)
36. Prema Tarangalu (1980)
37. Kottapeta Rowdy (1980)
38. Mama Allulla Saval (1980) as Public Prosecutor
39. Bebbuli as Basavudu aka 'Chi Chi Daba Chi Chi' Swamy
40. Gharana Donga (1980) as Professor, operator of counterfeit note machine
41. Bhola Shankarudu (1980)
42. Kaksha (1980)
43. Adrushtavanthudu (1980)
44. Bhale Krishnudu (1980)
45. Sarada Ramudu (1980)
46. Buchchi Babu (1980)
47. Rowdy Ramudu Konte Krishnudu (1980)
48. Kondaveeti Simham(1981)
49. Taxi Driver (1981)
50. Guru Shishyulu (1981)
51. Prema Kanuka (1981)
52. Madhura Swapnam (1982)
53. Justice Chowdary (1982)
54. Kalahala Kapuram (1982) as Puliraju
55. Jeevan Dhaara (1982) (Hindi)
56. Trisulam (1982)
57. Kaliyuga Ramudu (1982)
58. Naa Desam (1982)
59. Bobbili Puli (1982)
60. Pagabattina Simham (1982)
61. Pralaya Rudrudu (1982) as Simhadri
62. Sri Ranga Neethulu (1983)
63. Police Venkataswamy (1983)
64. Dharma Poratam (1983) as Keshavji
65. Neti Bharatam (1983)
66. Mundadugu (1983) as Nagendra
67. Shakthi (1983)
68. Khaidi (1983)
69. Prajarajyam (1983)
70. Padmavyuham (1984) as Bhimudu
71. Koteeswarudu (1984) as Manohar
72. Bharatamlo Sankharavam (1984)
73. Kode Trachu (1984) as Singh
74. Kondaveeti Nagulu (1984) as Duplicate Nagulu
75. Bobbili Brahmanna (1984)
76. Jagan (1984)
77. Sardar (1984) as Bhairavudu
78. Intiguttu (1984)
79. Anubandham (1984)
80. Bhale Ramudu (1984) as Hotel customer residing in room no. 420
81. Dandayatra (1984) as Seethapathi
82. Danavudu (1984) as Jagannatham's goon
83. Rowdy (1984) as Chalapathi
84. Srimadvirat Veerabrahmendra Swami Charitra (1984)
85. Dongalu Baboi Dongalu (1984) as Gavarraju
86. Terror (1985) as Reddappa
87. Bhale Thammudu (1985)
88. Devalayam (1985)
89. Chattamtho Poratam (1985)
90. Bangaru Chilaka (1985) as Koti
91. Edadugula Bandham (1985)
92. Mayadari Maridi (1985)
93. Mugguru Mitrulu (1985)
94. Aggiraju (1985)
95. Shri Datta Darshanam (1985)
96. Donga (1985)
97. Adavi Donga (1985)
98. Pattabhishekam (1985)
99. Palnati Simham(1985) as Rudraiah
100. Kirathakudu (1986)
101. Jayam Manade (1986) as Sobhanadri
102. Kaliyuga Pandavulu (1986)
103. Apoorva Sahodarudu (1986)
104. Prathidwani (1986)
105. Kondaveeti Raja (1986)
106. Murattu Karangal (1986) (Tamil)
107. Poojaku Panikiraani Puvvu (1986)
108. Ugra Narasimham (1986)
109. Aadapaduchu (1986)
110. Adavi Raja (1986) as Tribal Chief
111. Anasuyamma Gari Alludu (1986)
112. Ravana Brahma (1986) as Singanna
113. Chanakya Sapadham (1986) as Damodharam, Senior Customs Officer
114. Allari Krishnaiah (1987) as Veerabhadram
115. Agni Putrudu (1987)
116. Rowdy Babai (1987)
117. Maa Voori Magadu (1987) as Masthan
118. Ramu (1987)
119. Bharatamlo Arjunudu (1987) as Mallesh
120. Bhargava Ramudu (1987)
121. Sardar Krishnama Naidu (1987) as Parasuram
122. Sahasa Samrat (1987)
123. Nyayaniki Sankellu (1987) as Pratap Rao
124. Janaki Ramudu (1988)
125. Nava Bharatham (1988)
126. Ugranethrudu (1988) as Mangalagiri Mallanna
127. Chattamto Chadarangam (1988) as Railway Guard
128. Inspector Pratap (1988)
129. Sagatu Manishi (1988)
130. Raktha Thilakam (1988)
131. Aswaddhama (1988) as Seth Kishanlal
132. Donga Ramudu (1988)
133. Sankellu (1988)
134. Tiragabadda Telugubidda (1988)
135. Ramudu Bheemudu (1988)
136. State Rowdy (1989)
137. Prema (1989)
138. Vijay (1989)
139. Simha Swapnam (1989)
140. Raktha Kanneeru (1989) as Dunnapothula Dushasana Rao
141. Ashoka Chakravarthy (1989)
142. Bhale Donga (1989) as Potharaju
143. Mamathala Kovela (1989)
144. Dhruva Nakshatram (1989)
145. Dorikithe Dongalu (1989) as Koteshwara Rao
146. Palnati Rudraiah (1989) as Chalapathi
147. Justice Rudrama Devi (1990) as Veereshwara Rao
148. Neti Dowrjanyam (1990) as Opposing gang's leader
149. Aggiramudu (1990) as Sasibhushan Rao
150. Kondaveeti Donga (1990)
151. Dharma (1990)
152. Kadapa Reddemma (1990)
153. Maa Inti Katha (1990)
154. Doctor Bhavani (1990)
155. Aditya 369 (1991)
156. Police Encounter (1991
157. Jagannatakam (1991)
158. Amma Rajinama (1991)
159. Tholi Puddu (1991)
160. Viyyala Vari Vindhu (1991)
161. Mother India (1992)
162. Peddarikam (1992)
163. Parvathalu Panakalu (1992)
164. Gharana Mogudu (1992)
165. Kunthiputhrudu (1993)
166. Major Chandrakanth (1993)
167. Inspector Jhansi (1993) as Mavudlayya
168. Parugo Parugu (1993)
169. Chinna Alludu (1993)
170. Pelli Gola (1993)
171. Radha Saradhi (1993)
172. Allari Alludu (1993)
173. Mogudu Garu (1993)
174. Inspector Ashwini (1993)
175. Jailor Gaari Abbayi (1994)
176. Bhale Mavayya (1994)
177. Presidentgari Alludu (1994) as Chalapathi
178. Kurradhi Kurradu (1994) as Tribal Chief
179. Aame (1994)
180. Atha Kodalu (1994)
181. Ammayi Kapuram (1994)
182. Super Police (1994)
183. Gandeevam (1994)
184. Bobbili Simham (1994)
185. Ghatotkachudu (1995)
186. Alluda Majaka (1995)
187. Bhale Bullodu (1995)
188. Aadaalla Majaka (1995)
189. Badilli (1995)
190. Gulabi (1995)
191. Pokiri Raja (1995)
192. Mayabazaar (1995)
193. Sisindri (1995)
194. Pedarayudu (1995)
195. Sankalpam (1995)
196. Vajram (1995)
197. Sampradayam (1996) as Bhupathi Raja's father
198. Ninne Pelladata (1996)
199. Vamsanikokkadu (1996)
200. Rayudugaru Nayudugaru (1996)
201. Hello Neeku Naaku Pellanta (1996)
202. Ramudochadu (1996)
203. Jabilamma Pelli (1996)
204. Bobbili Bullodu (1996)
205. Mrugam (1996)
206. Maa Nannaki Pelli (1997)
207. Veedevadandi Babu (1997)
208. Sindhooram (1997)
209. Circus Sattipandu (1997)
210. Priyamaina Srivaru (1997) as Jogarao
211. Pattukondi Chuddam (1997)
212. Aahwanam (1997)
213. Nenu Premisthunnanu (1997)
214. Chilakkottudu (1997)
215. Kaliyugamlo Gandargolam (1997)
216. Super Heroes (1997)
217. Anaganaga Oka Roju (1997)
218. Vammo Vatto O Pellaammo (1997)
219. Abbai Gari Pelli (1997)
220. Muddula Mogudu (1997)
221. Oka Chinna Maata (1997)
222. Snehithulu (1998)
223. Manasichi Choodu (1998)
224. Ganesh (1998)
225. Subhalekhalu (1998)
226. Yuvaratna Raana (1998)
227. Sri Sitaramula Kalyanam Chutamu Rarandi (1998)
228. Panduga (1998)
229. Sri Ramulayya (1998)
230. Prema Kosam (1999)
231. Yamajathakudu (1999)
232. Sooryavansham (1999) (Hindi)
233. Naa Hrudayamlo Nidurinche Cheli (1999)
234. Nee Kosam (1999)
235. Real Story (2000)
236. Chala Bagundi (2000)
237. Ninne Premistha (2000)
238. Nuvve Kavali (2000)
239. Vamshoddharakudu (2000)
240. Ammo! Okato Tareekhu (2000)
241. Vijayaramaraju (2000)
242. Mrugaraju (2001)
243. Sampangi (2001)
244. Naalo Unna Prema (2001)
245. Evadra Rowdy (2001) as Chalapathi
246. Repallelo Radha (2001)
247. Akasa Veedhilo (2001)
248. Simharasi (2001)
249. Thank You Subba Rao (2001)
250. Snehamante Idera (2001)
251. Cheppalani Vundhi (2001)
252. Apparaoki Oka Nela Thappindi (2001)
253. Aadi (2002)
254. Allari (2002)
255. Tappu Chesi Pappu Koodu (2002)
256. Hai (2002)
257. Holi (2002)
258. Thotti Gang (2002)
259. Chennakesava Reddy (2002)
260. Dil (2003)
261. Simhadri (2003)
262. Dham (2003)
263. Nenu Seetamahalakshmi (2003)
264. Ammayilu Abbayilu (2003)
265. Janaki Weds Sriram (2003)
266. Aaruguru Pativratalu (2004)
267. Malliswari (2004)
268. Nenu (2004)
269. Swamy (2004)
270. Gowri (2004)
271. Shankar Dada M.B.B.S. (2004)
272. Aaptudu (2004)
273. Aa Naluguru (2004)
274. Bhadradri Ramudu (2004)
275. Pourusham (2005)
276. Dhairyam (2005)
277. Bunny (2005)
278. Good Boy (2005)
279. Allari Pidugu (2005)
280. Jagapati (2005)
281. Nuvvante Naakishtam (2005)
282. Kithakithalu (2006)
283. Mudhu (2006)
284. Asadhyudu (2006)
285. Bommarillu (2006)
286. Party (2006)
287. Andala Ramudu (2006)
288. Godava (2007)
289. Madhumasam (2007)
290. Athili Sattibabu LKG (2007)
291. Munna (2007)
292. Operation Duryodhana (2007)
293. Lakshyam (2007)
294. Yamagola Malli Modalayindi (2007)
295. Bhajantrilu (2007)
296. Don (2007)
297. Allari Allare (2007)
298. Yogi (2007)
299. Okka Magadu (2008)
300. Deepavali (2008) as Sirisha's father
301. Aatadista (2008)
302. Tinnama Padukunnama Tellarinda! (2008)
303. Kalidasu (2008)
304. Appuchesi Pappukudu (2008)
305. Hare Ram (2008)
306. Baladur (2008)
307. Chintakayala Ravi (2008)
308. Kousalya Supraja Rama (2008)
309. Ekaloveyudu (2008)
310. Kuberulu (2008)
311. Naa Style Veru (2009)
312. Arundhati (2009)
313. Fitting Master (2009)
314. Adhineta (2009)
315. Mitrudu (2009)
316. Kick (2009)
317. Samrajyam (2009)
318. Anjaneyulu (2009)
319. Bendu Apparao R.M.P (2009)
320. Jayeebhava (2009)
321. Ek Niranjan (2009)
322. Kasko (2009)
323. Pravarakhyudu (2009)
324. Srimathi Kalyanam (2010)
325. Buridi (2010)
326. Simha (2010)
327. Betting Bangaraju (2010)
328. Sye Aata (2010)
329. Kathi Kantha Rao (2010)
330. Nagavalli (2010)
331. Ranga The Donga (2010)
332. Broker (2010)
333. KSD Appalaraju (2011)
334. Veera (2011)
335. Maaro (2011)
336. Money Money, More Money (2011)
337. Dushasana (2011)
338. Madatha Kaja (2011)
339. Chattam (2011)
340. Brahmi Gadi Katha (2011)
341. Kshetram (2011)
342. Friends Book (2012)
343. Dhammu (2012)
344. Nandeeshwarudu (2012)
345. Uu Kodathara? Ulikki Padathara? (2012)
346. Sudigadu (2012)
347. Rebel (2012)
348. Avunu (2012)
349. Dhenikaina Ready
350. Yamudiki Mogudu (2012)
351. Onamalu (2012)
352. Sevakudu (2013)
353. Mahankali (2013)
354. Naayak (2013) as Riyaz Bhai
355. Jai Sreeram (2013)
356. 1000 Abaddalu (2013)
357. Bhai (2013)
358. Sukumarudu (2013)
359. Biskett (2013)
360. Legend (2014)
361. Manam (2014)
362. Manasa Thulli Padake (2014)
363. Ra Ra... Krishnayya (2014)
364. Drushyam (2014)
365. Oka Laila Kosam (2014)
366. Ee Varsham Sakshiga (2014)
367. Tungabhadra (2015)
368. Jil (2015)
369. Dohchay (2015)
370. Baahubali The Beginning (2015)
371. Lion (2015)
372. Vinavayya Ramayya (2015)
373. Tippu (2015)
374. Soggade Chinni Nayana (2016)
375. Sarrainodu (2016)
376. Parvathipuram (2016) (dubbed in 2023 as Veera Khadgam)
377. Mental Police (2016)
378. Meelo Evaru Koteeswarudu (2016)
379. Intlo Deyyam Nakem Bhayam (2016)
380. Sathamanam Bhavati (2017)
381. Head Constable Venkatramaiah (2017)
382. Rarandoi Veduka Chudham (2017)
383. Jaya Janaki Nayaka (2017)
384. Jai Lava Kusa (2017)
385. Ammammagarillu (2018)
386. Nannu Dochukunduvate (2018)
387. Vinaya Vidheya Rama (2019)
388. Ruler (2019)
389. Johaar (2020)
390. Aaradugula Bullet (2021)
391. Bangarraju (2022)

==== TV series ====
Year	Title	Role	Platform	Notes
2020	Chadarangam	Guru Murthy	ZEE5	

=== As producer ===
1. Kaliyuga Krishnudu
2. Kadapareddamma
3. Jagannatakam
4. Pellante Nurella Panta
5. Presidentigari Alludu
6. Ardharatri Hatyalu
7. Raktham Chindina Raatri
