= Aayudham (1990 film) =

1990 Telugu action film by K. Murali Mohan Rao

- Directed by: K. Murali Mohan Rao
- Produced by: G. Satyanarayana
- Starring: Krishna; Radha; Ghattamaneni Ramesh Babu
- Cinematography: K. S. Hari
- Edited by: Narasimha Rao
- Music by: Chakravarthy
- Production company: Sri Balaji Films
- Release date: 25 May 1990
- Country: India
- Language: Telugu

Aayudham (transl. Weapon) is a 1990 Indian Telugu-language action film directed by K. Murali Mohan Rao starring Krishna, Ghattamaneni Ramesh Babu, Radha and Vani Viswanath in the lead roles. The film was produced by G. Satyanarayana for Sri Balaji Films.

== Cast ==
- Krishna as Kalyan Kumar IAS
- Radha
- Ghattamaneni Ramesh Babu as Benerjee
- Vani Viswanath
- Kaikala Satyanarayana as Peda Venkatrayudu
- Babu Mohan
- Mada
- P. L. Narayana
- Suthi Velu
- Sai Kumar as China Venkatrayudu
- Mallikarjuna Rao
- Siva Krishna
- Anuradha

== Soundtrack ==
Chakravarthy scored and composed the film's soundtrack album which comprised 5 songs. Veturi Sundrarama Murthy penned the lyrics.

- "Yeve Yeve Rangamma" — Mano, S. Janaki
- "Chinthaku Thooche" — S. P. B., S. Janaki
- "Maa Palle Kochindhi" — Mano, S. Janaki
- "Saru Doragaaru" — S. P. B., S. Janaki
- "Baava Nuvvu Naa Mogudu" — S. P. B., S. Janaki
