= Raaga Deepam =

- Theatrical release poster
- Directed by: Dasari Narayana Rao
- Written by: Dasari Narayana Rao
- Produced by: Kodali Bosu Babu; Dasari Narayana Rao (Presents)
- Starring: Akkineni Nageswara Rao; Jayasudha
- Cinematography: P. S. Selvaraj
- Edited by: B. Krishnam Raju
- Music by: Chakravarthy
- Production company: Veera Rani Enterprises
- Release date: 15 January 1982
- Running time: 134 minutes
- Country: India
- Language: Telugu

Raaga Deepam (transl. Musical Light) is a 1982 Indian Telugu-language drama film, written and directed by Dasari Narayana Rao and produced by Kodali Bosu Babu under the banner of Veera Rani Enterprises.

It stars Akkineni Nageswara Rao and Jayasudha in lead roles. It features original songs composed by Chakravarthy.

== Cast ==
- Akkineni Nageswara Rao as Chakravarthy
- Jayasudha as Kalyani
- Lakshmi as Gowri
- Rao Gopal Rao as Gopal Rao, Kalyani's father
- Gummadi as Master
- Ranganath as Ranganath
- Sivaranjani
- Jayasheela

== Soundtrack ==
Raaga Deepam

Film score by Chakravarthy
- Released: 1981
- Genre: Soundtrack
- Length: 31:00
- Label: SEA Records
- Producer: Chakravarthy

Chakravarthy chronology
Devata (1982)	Raaga Deepam (1981)	Gopala Krishnudu (1982)

Music composed by Chakravarthy. Music released on SEA Records Audio Company.

S. No.	Song title	Lyrics	Singers	length
1	"Adhigo Adhigo"	Dasari Narayana Rao	S. P. Balasubrahmanyam, P. Susheela	4:36
2	"Nee Car No. 1"	Dasari Narayana Rao	S. P. Balasubrahmanyam, P. Susheela	4:31
3	"Kunkuma Poosina Aakaasamlo"	Veturi	S. P. Balasubrahmanyam, P. Susheela	4:26
4	"Thellaavaare Thellaavaare"	Dasari Narayana Rao	Prakash Rao, P. Susheela	4:32
5	"Vayyaraniki Otistha"	Veturi	S. P. Balasubrahmanyam, P. Susheela	4:24
6	"Poosee Pooyani"	Veturi	S. P. Balasubrahmanyam	4:05
7	"Pasuputhaaduku Mudulu"	C. Narayana Reddy	S. P. Balasubrahmanyam	4:26
