= Sri Ranga Neethulu =

- Theatrical release poster
- Directed by: A. Kodandarami Reddy
- Written by: D. V. Narasa Raju (story / dialogues)
- Screenplay by: A. Kodandarami Reddy
- Based on: Ooty Varai Uravu (Tamil)
- Produced by: Venkat Akkineni; Nagarjuna Akkineni
- Starring: Akkineni Nageswara Rao; Sridevi
- Cinematography: S. Navakanth
- Edited by: B. Krishnam Raju
- Music by: Chakravarthy
- Production company: Annapurna Studios
- Release date: 22 September 1983
- Running time: 147 minutes
- Country: India
- Language: Telugu

Sri Ranga Neethulu is a 1983 Indian Telugu-language comedy film, produced by Venkat Akkineni, Nagarjuna Akkineni under the Annapurna Studios banner and directed by A. Kodandarami Reddy. It stars Akkineni Nageswara Rao and Sridevi, with music composed by Chakravarthy. It is a remake of the Tamil film Ooty Varai Uravu (1967). The film was recorded as a Super Hit at the box office.

== Plot ==
Rajesh boards the same train as Lakshmi and sees an ad in the newspaper on Vijaya and tries to call the police from the train but Vijaya intercepts and requests him not to. When her luggage falls and opens, Rajesh finds pictures of his father with another woman. He realizes that Narayana Murthy had a second wife, Shobha, with a daughter, Lakshmi, and he kept this fact hidden from the world. After Shobha's death, Lakshmi proceeded to find her father.

Upon discovering Rajesh is Narayana Murthy's son, she becomes nervous as she showed him proof of his father's second affair. Rajesh discovers Vijaya's identity through a letter she wrote and the fact that she is not really his sister.

== Cast ==
- Akkineni Nageswara Rao as Rajesh
- Sridevi as Vijaya / Lakshmi
- Satyanarayana as Narayana Murthy
- Chandra Mohan as Ravi
- Vijayashanti as Lakshmi
- Nagesh as Dr. Sundara Murthy
- Chalapathi Rao as Chalapathi
- Ramji as John
- Chitti Babu as Astrologer Daivadinam
- Pandari Bai as Janaki
- S. Varalakshmi as Raja Rajeswari Devi
- Rama Prabha as Bhanu
- Athili Lakshmi as Shobha
- Ragini as Shanthi

== Soundtrack ==
Music composed by Chakravarthy.

Song title	Lyrics	Singers	length
"Gootikocchina Chilakaa"	Acharya Aatreya	Madhavapeddi Ramesh	3:56
"Thongi Thongi Choodamaaku"	Acharya Aatreya	S. P. Balasubrahmanyam, P. Susheela	4:11
"Kallu OK Pallu OK"	Acharya Aatreya	S. P. Balasubrahmanyam, P. Susheela	4:06
"Panchami Poota Manchidhani"	Raja Sri	S. P. Balasubrahmanyam, P. Susheela	4:28
"Andhaalamma"	Raja Sri	S. P. Balasubrahmanyam, P. Susheela	4:19
"Naaku Chocolate Kavali"	Raja Sri	S. P. Balasubrahmanyam, P. Susheela	4:15
