= Idi Pellantara =

- Theatrical release poster
- Directed by: D. Vijaya Bhaskar
- Produced by: Kranthi Kumar
- Starring: Chiranjeevi; Radhika
- Music by: Chakravarthy
- Production company: Kranthi Chitra
- Release date: 16 July 1982
- Country: India
- Language: Telugu

Idi Pellantara (transl. Is This a Marriage?) is a 1982 Indian Telugu-language film starring Chiranjeevi and Radhika with Gollapudi Maruti Rao in a pivotal role. The film was directed by Vijay Bhaskar and produced by Kranthi Kumar. It was released on 16 July 1982.

== Plot ==
Radha (Radhika), a woman who flees an abusive marriage. She starts a new life and finds love with a kind-hearted man named Deepak (Chiranjeevi), who accepts her and her child. However, her violent husband returns, leading to a dramatic courtroom showdown where Radha fights for her freedom.

== Cast ==
- Chiranjeevi
- Radhika
- Gollapudi Maruti Rao
