= Pagabattina Simham =

1982 Indian Telugu film directed by P. Chandrasekhara Reddy

- Directed by: P. Chandrasekhara Reddy
- Written by: N. V. Subba Raju; Modukuri Johnson
- Produced by: Kalidindi Vishwanatha Raju
- Starring: Krishna; Jaya Prada; Geetha; Prabha; Kaikala Satyanarayana; Prasad Babu
- Cinematography: S. S. Lal
- Edited by: Nayani Maheswara Rao
- Music by: Satyam
- Production company: Chandra Cine Arts
- Release date: 3 September 1982
- Country: India
- Language: Telugu

Pagabattina Simham (transl. Revenge Seeking Lion) is an Indian Telugu action drama film starring Krishna in three different roles alongside an ensemble cast which includes Jaya Prada, Prabha, Geetha, Kaikala Satyanarayana and Prasad Babu. Produced by Kalidindi Vishwanatha Raju under Chandra Cine Arts, the film directed by P. Chandrasekhara Reddy had musical score by Satyam. The film was released on 3 September 1982 to generally positive reviews.

== Cast ==
- Krishna as Hari, Mohan Krishna, Muddu Krishna (Triple Role)
- Jaya Prada
- Geetha
- Prabha as Jhansi
- Kaikala Satyanarayana as Ranga
- Prasad Babu as Santhosh
- Allu Ramalingaiah as Sundara Murthy
- Nagabhushanam as Picheswara Rao
- Rajanala as Ramapuram Zamindar
- Thyagaraju
- Sarathi
- Ramana Murthy as Inspector Ramakrishna
- Pushpalatha
- Chalapathi Rao

== Music ==
Pagabattina Simham

Soundtrack album by Satyam
- Released: 1982
- Recorded: 1982
- Genre: Feature film soundtrack
- Language: Telugu

Chellapilla Satyam scored and composed the film's soundtrack.

- Aakasham Anchulu -
- Pindhe Sandho -
- Singapore Shipanu -
- Vesukondhama -

== Sources ==
Pagabattina Simham on Moviebuff
