= Chiranjeevi filmography =

List of film appearances by Chiranjeevi

Chiranjeevi is an Indian actor, politician, philanthropist and television host who predominantly works in Telugu cinema. He has also appeared in Hindi, Tamil and Kannada films. Chiranjeevi made his acting debut in 1978, with the film Punadhirallu. However, Pranam Khareedu was released earlier at the box office. Known for his break dancing skills, Chiranjeevi has starred in more than 150 feature films. He rose to stardom after playing the lead in the action film Khaidi (1983). His 1987 film Swayamkrushi premiered at the Moscow International Film Festival. He co-produced Rudraveena (1988), which won the National Film Award for Best Feature Film on National Integration. In a film career spanning forty-five years, he has won four state Nandi Awards and nine Filmfare Awards South.

Chiranjeevi was honoured with the Padma Bhushan (India's third highest civilian award) in 2006, and Padma Vibhushan (India's second highest civilian award) in 2024, for his contributions to Indian cinema, and was presented with an honorary doctorate from Andhra University. In 2013, he inaugurated the Incredible India Exhibition, a joint participation of the Ministry of Tourism and Ministry of Information and Broadcasting at the 66th Cannes Film Festival. He also represented Incredible India at the 14th International Indian Film Academy Awards ceremony held in Macau. In 2013, IBN LIVE named him as one of "the men who changed the face of the Indian Cinema".

Chiranjeevi's 1992 film Gharana Mogudu is the first Telugu film to gross over ₹10 crore at the box office. The film made Chiranjeevi the highest-paid actor in India at the time, catapulting him to the cover pages of noted national weekly magazines in India. The entertainment magazines Filmfare and India Today named him "Bigger than Bachchan", a reference to Bollywood's Amitabh Bachchan. News magazine The Week hailed him as "The new money machine". He was paid a remuneration of ₹1.25 crores for the 1992 film Aapadbandhavudu, the highest for any Indian actor then. In 2002, Chiranjeevi was given the Samman Award for the Highest Income Tax Payer for the assessment year 1999–2000 by the Minister of State for Finance, Government of India. A poll conducted by CNN-IBN in 2006 named Chiranjeevi the most popular star of the Telugu Film Industry. Following the release of Shankar Dada Zindabad (2007), Chiranjeevi took a hiatus to focus on his political commitments between 2008 and 2015 and returned to cinema through the action comedy film Khaidi No. 150 (2017).

== As an actor ==
Key
†	Denotes films that have not yet been released

=== Telugu ===
Year	Title	Role	Notes	Ref.
1978	Pranam Khareedu	Narsimha		
1978	Mana Voori Pandavulu	Parthu		
1979	Tayaramma Bangarayya	Juothi's Husband	Cameo	
1979	Kukka Katuku Cheppu Debba	Sekhar		
1979	Kotta Alludu	Jagan		
1979	I Love You	Ramesh		
1979	Punadhirallu	Unknown		
1979	Idhi Katha Kadhu	Subanakar		
1979	Sri Rama Bantu	Raghu Ram		
1979	Kothala Raayudu	Satyam		
1980	Agni Samskaram	Unknown		
1980	Kottapeta Rowdy	Prasanna Kumar	Cameo	
1980	Chandipriya	Anil		
1980	Aarani Mantalu	Ravi		
1980	Jathara	Rambabu		
1980	Mosagadu	Seshu		
1980	Punnami Naagu	Naagulu		
1980	Nakili Manishi	Prasad / Shyam (Note: Chiranjeevi played two characters.)		
1980	Kaali	GK		
1980	Thathayya Premaleelalu	Anil		
1980	Love In Singapore	Suresh		
1980	Prema Tarangalu	Kumar		
1980	Mogudu Kaavali	Chiranjeevi		
1980	Rakta Bandham	Tilak	25th film	
1981	Aadavaallu Meeku Joharlu	Himself	Special appearance	
1981	Parvathi Parameswarulu	Mohan		
1981	Todu Dongalu	Kishore		
1981	Tirugu Leni Manishi	Kishore		
1981	Prema Natakam	Himself	Special appearance	
1981	Nyayam Kavali	Suresh Kumar		
1981	Oorukichina Maata	Ramudu		
1981	Rani Kasula Rangamma	Sukumar		
1981	47 Rojulu	Kumar		
1981	Srirasthu Subhamasthu	Krishna		
1981	Priya	Vijay		
1981	Chattaniki Kallu Levu	Vijay		
1981	Kirayi Rowdylu	Raja		
1982	Intlo Ramayya Veedhilo Krishnayya	Rajasekharam		
1982	Subhalekha	Narasimha Murthi	Filmfare Award for Best Telugu Actor	
1982	Idi Pellantara	Deepak		
1982	Sitadevi	Prabhakar		
1982	Radha My Darling	Mohan		
1982	Tingu Rangadu	Ranga		
1982	Patnam Vachina Pativrathalu	Gopi		
1982	Billa Ranga	Billa and Inspector Vishnu		
1982	Yamakinkarudu	Vijay		
1982	Mondi Ghatam	Ravindra		
1982	Manchu Pallaki	Sekhar		
1982	Bandhalu Anubandhalu	Inspector Chiranjeevi	50th film	
1983	Prema Pichollu	Ravi		
1983	Palletoori Monagadu	Raju		
1983	Abhilasha	Chiranjeevi		
1983	Aalaya Sikharam	Seenu		
1983	Sivudu Sivudu Sivudu	Sivudu / Vijay		
1983	Puli Bebbuli	Gopi Krishna		
1983	Gudachari No.1	Vijay		
1983	Maga Maharaju	Raju		
1983	Roshagadu	Sikindar and Srikanth		
1983	Maa Inti Premayanam	Himself	Special appearance	
1983	Simhapuri Simham	Raja Sekharam and Vijay		
1983	Khaidi	Sooryam		
1983	Mantri Gari Viyyankudu	Babji		
1983	Sangharshana	Dilip		
1984	Allullostunnaru	Gopi		
1984	Goonda	Kalidas / Raja / Ravi		
1984	Hero	Krishna		
1984	Devanthakudu	Vijay Kumar		
1984	Mahanagaramlo Mayagadu	Raja		
1984	Challenge	Gandhi		
1984	Intiguttu	Vijay Kumar		
1984	Naagu	Naagu		
1984	Agni Gundam	Vijay		
1984	Rustum	Hari		
1985	Chattamtho Poratam	Ravishankar	75th film	
1985	Donga	Phani		
1985	Chiranjeevi	Chiranjeevi		
1985	Jwaala	Raju / Yuvaraju		
1985	Puli	Kranthi		
1985	Rakta Sindhuram	Gandragoddali and Gopi		
1985	Adavi Donga	Kalidas		
1985	Vijetha	Chinna Babu	Filmfare Award for Best Telugu Actor	
1986	Kirathakudu	Charan		
1986	Kondaveeti Raja	Raja		
1986	Magadheerudu	Raju		
1986	Veta	Ranapratap Kumar Varma		
1986	Chantabbai	Panduranga Rao		
1986	Rakshasudu	Purusha		
1986	Dhairyavanthudu	Kishore		
1986	Chanakya Sapatham	Chanakya		
1987	Donga Mogudu	Ravi Teja and Nagaraju		
1987	Aradhana	Puli Raju		
1987	Chakravarthy	Chakravarthy and Anji		
1987	Trimurtulu		Cameo	
1987	Pasivadi Pranam	Madhu		
1987	Swayamkrushi	Sambayya	Nandi Award for Best Actor	
1987	Jebu Donga	Chitti Babu		
1988	Manchi Donga	Veerendra		
1988	Rudraveena	Suryanarayana Sarma	Also presenter; Nandi Special Jury Award	
1988	Yamudiki Mogudu	Kali / Balu		
1988	Khaidi No. 786	Gopi		
1988	Marana Mrudangam	Janardhan / Johnny		
1988	Trinetrudu	Abhimanyu	100th film	
1988	Yuddha Bhoomi	Vijay		
1989	Attaku Yamudu Ammayiki Mogudu	Kalyan		
1989	State Rowdy	Kalicharan/Pruthvi		
1989	Rudranetra	Nethra		
1989	Lankeswarudu	Siva Shankar		
1990	Kondaveeti Donga	Raja		
1990	Jagadeka Veerudu Athiloka Sundari	Raju		
1990	Kodama Simham	Bharath		
1990	Raja Vikramarka	Raja Vikramarka		
1991	Stuartpuram Police Station	Inspector Rana Pratap		
1991	Gang Leader	Rajaram		
1991	Rowdy Alludu	Auto Johnny / Kalyan		
1992	Gharana Mogudu	Raju		
1992	Aapadbandhavudu	Madhava	Filmfare Award for Best Telugu Actor; Nandi Award for Best Actor	
1993	Muta Mestri	Subhash Chandra Bose	Filmfare Award for Best Telugu Actor	
1993	Mechanic Alludu	Ravi		
1994	Mugguru Monagallu	Prudhvi, Vikram, and Dattatreya		
1994	Madam			
1994	S. P. Parasuram	SP Parasuram IPS		
1995	Alluda Majaka	Sitaramudu / Toyota		
1995	Big Boss	Surendra		
1995	Rikshavodu	Raju and Dharma Rayudu		
1997	Hitler	Madhava Rao		
1997	Master	Raj Kumar	Also playback singer	
1998	Bavagaru Bagunnara?	Raju		
1998	Choodalani Vundi	Ramakrishna		
1999	Sneham Kosam	Simhadri / Chinnayya	125th film; Filmfare Award for Best Telugu Actor	
1999	Iddaru Mitrulu	Vijay		
2000	Annayya	Rajaram		
2000	Hands Up	Saraswati's husband	Special appearance	
2001	Mrugaraju	Raju	Also playback Singer	
2001	Sri Manjunatha	Manjunatha / Lord Siva	Kannada film; Partially reshot in Telugu	
2001	Daddy	Rajkumar		
2002	Indra	Indrasena Reddy / Shankar Narayana	Filmfare Award for Best Telugu Actor; Nandi Award for Best Actor	
2003	Tagore	Ravindranath Tagore		
2004	Anji	Anji		
2004	Shankar Dada M.B.B.S.	Shankar Prasad "Shankar Dada"	Filmfare Award for Best Telugu Actor	
2005	Andarivaadu	Govindarajulu / Siddharth		
2005	Jai Chiranjeeva	Satyanarayana Murthy		
2006	Stalin	Major Stalin		
2006	Style	Himself	Special appearance	
2007	Shankar Dada Zindabad	Shankar Prasad "Shankar Dada"		
2009	Magadheera	Himself	Special appearance	
2013	Jagadguru Adi Shankara	Manjunatha / Lord Siva	Cameo; archive footage	
2015	Bruce Lee: The Fighter	Himself	Special appearance	
2017	Khaidi No. 150	Kaththi Seenu / Konidela Sivasankara Varaprasad	150th film	
2019	Sye Raa Narasimha Reddy	Uyyalawada Narasimha Reddy		
2022	Acharya	Acharya		
2022	Godfather	Brahma Teja "Godfather" / Abram Qureshi		
2023	Waltair Veerayya	Waltair Veerayya		
2023	Bhola Shankar	Bhola Shankar		
2026	Mana Shankara Vara Prasad Garu	Shankara Vara Prasad		
2026	Vishwambhara †	TBA	Post-production	
2027	Kaaka †	K. Sathyam / Kadiri Kaalidas	Filming	
TBA †	TBA	Announced		

=== Other languages ===
Year	Title	Role(s)	Language	Notes	Ref.
1981	47 Natkal	Kumar	Tamil	Bilingual film; Simultaneously shot in Telugu as 47 Rojulu	
1981	Ranuva Veeran	The Thief	Tamil		
1989	Mappillai	Himself	Tamil	Special appearance	
1990	Engal Swamy Ayyappan	Himself	Tamil	Archival footage	
1990	Pratibandh	Siddhanth	Hindi	Remake of Ankusam (1989)	
1992	Aaj Ka Goonda Raaj	Raja	Hindi	Remake of Gang Leader	
1994	The Gentleman	Vijay	Hindi	Remake of Gentleman (1993)	
1996	Sipayi	Major Chandrakanth	Kannada		
2001	Sri Manjunatha	Manjunatha / Lord Shiva	Kannada	Partially reshot in Telugu	

== Other roles ==
Year	Title	Position	Notes	Ref.
2006	Hanuman	Sri Anjaneyulu (voice)	Telugu version	
2010	Varudu	Narrator		
2013	Jagadguru Adi Shankara	Narrator		
2015	Rudhramadevi	Narrator		
2017	Gunturodu	Narrator		
2017	Ghazi	Narrator	Telugu version	
2022	Son of India	Narrator		
2022	Brahmāstra: Part One – Shiva	Narrator	Telugu version	
2022	Ponniyin Selvan: I	Narrator	Telugu version	
2023	Ranga Maarthaanda	Narrator		
2023	Ponniyin Selvan: II	Narrator	Telugu version	

== Television ==
Year	Title	Language	Role	Channel
2017	Meelo Evaru Koteeswarudu	Telugu	Host	Star Maa
