= Valu Jada Tholu Beltu =

- VCD Cover
- Directed by: Vijaya Bapineedu
- Written by: V. Anand Shankaram (dialogues)
- Screenplay by: Vijaya Bapineedu
- Story by: Vijaya Bapineedu; M.V.V.S. Babu Rao (script)
- Produced by: Gutta Madhusudana Rao
- Starring: Rajendra Prasad; Kanaka
- Cinematography: Babu
- Edited by: Trinath
- Music by: Prasanna Swaraj
- Production company: M.R.C. Movie Creations
- Release date: 21 February 1992
- Running time: 122 mins
- Country: India
- Language: Telugu

Valu Jada Tholu Beltu (transl. Long braid-Leather belt) is a 1992 Indian Telugu-language comedy film, produced by Gutta Madhusudana Rao under the banner M.R.C. Movie Creations and directed by Vijaya Bapineedu. It stars Rajendra Prasad, Kanaka with music composed by Prasanna Swaraj. It is the remake of the successful 1990 Malayalam film, Nanma Niranjavan Sreenivasan, starring Jayaram, Urvashi.

== Plot ==
The film begins in a village, Accha Rao, a callow craven who leads a rejoicing life. He acquires a constable job and takes charge where the Station S.I. is demonic. Here, their Head Constable endears Accha Rao's amiable nature, shelters him, and his daughter Seeta loves him. Meanwhile, a new scheme commences by a company to sell households at the lowest prices which is bogus. The company agent, Peter, collects massive amounts when, the Proprietor's son tries to flee and Peter bars him. Accidentally, he dies at Peter's hands when S.I. takes charge and targets him for terrible torture. Exploiting Accha Rao's solace, Peter absconds, and the Head Constable takes the guilt to shield him. To redeem himself, Accha Rao moves to catch Peter with Seeta. The district S.P. mandates S.I. to produce Accha Rao & Peter in his sight, and the Company Proprietor bids him slay them out. During this trial, Accha Rao acquaints with Peter's mother and learns that his wife is terminally ill. Ergo, he takes care of the two as his own and mingles Peter with them, detecting his whereabouts. After that, Peter surrenders himself, and the Company Proprietor adversely clutches Accha Rao. The heels seek to slay him, but Accha Rao breaks out by killing the Company Proprietor and walks to Peter. By then, S.I. encounters him and chases to wipe out Accha Rao. Fortuitously, the S.P. witnesses it and knocks out the blackguard. At last, the department honors Accha Rao with a promotion. Finally, the movie ends with the marriage of Accha Rao & Seeta.

== Cast ==
- Rajendra Prasad as Accha Rao
- Kanaka as Seeta
- Vallabhaneni Janardhan as S.I.
- M. S. Gopinath as Company Proprietor
- P. L. Narayana as Head Constable
- Sai Kumar as Peter
- Nutan Prasad as Accha Rao's maternal uncle
- Brahmanandam
- Babu Mohan
- Kota Shankar Rao as S.P.
- Ananth as Accha Rao's friend
- Chitti Babu as Accha Rao's friend
- Potti Prasad
- Kallu Chidambaram
- Ironleg Sastri as Accha Rao's friend
- Dham
- Varalakshmi as Sri Mahalakshmi
- Radha Kumari as Peter's mother
- Annuja
- Sailaja as Peter's wife
- Kalpana Rai
- Nirmalamma as Accha Rao's grandmother

== Crew ==
- Art: AP Raju
- Choreography: Thara, Siva Subrahmanyam, Prameela
- Stills: G. Narayana Rao
- Fights: Vicky
- Script: M. V. V. S. Babu Rao
- Dialogues: V. Ananda Shankaram
- Lyrics: Bhuvana Chandra
- Playback: S. P. Balasubrahmanyam, Chitra, Malgudi Subha
- Music: Prasanna Sarraj
- Editing: Trinath
- Cinematography: Babu
- Producer: Gutta Madhusudana Rao
- Story - Screenplay - Director: Vijaya Bapineedu
- Banner: M.R.C. Movie Creations
- Release date: 21 February 1992

== Soundtrack ==
Valu Jada Tolu Beltu

Film score by Prasanna Swaraj
- Released: 1991
- Genre: Soundtrack
- Length: 13:56
- Label: Supreme Audio
- Producer: Prasanna Swaraj

Music composed by Prasanna Swaraj. Lyrics were written by Bhuvana Chandra. Music released on Supreme Audio Company.

No.	Title	Singer(s)	Length
1.	"Pedha Veedhi Chinna Veedhi"	S. P. Balasubrahmanyam	3:59
2.	"Goli Soda Thagistha"	Malgudi Subha	2:57
3.	"Gangaravi Chettu Kada"	S. P. Balasubrahmanyam, Chitra	3:06
4.	"Abba Em Gaali"	S. P. Balasubrahmanyam, Chitra	3:54
Total length:			13:56

== Other ==
- VCDs and DVDs on - VOLGA Videos, Hyderabad
