= Athani Kante Ghanudu =

1978 Telugu film by G. C. Sekhar

- Directed by: G. C. Sekhar
- Produced by: Adusumilli Lakshmi Kumar
- Starring: Krishna Ghattamaneni; Jaya Prada; Rao Gopala Rao; Sowcar Janaki; Kaikala Satyanarayana
- Cinematography: Pushpala Gopala Krishna
- Edited by: Kotagiri Gopala Rao
- Music by: Chakravarthy
- Production company: Maruti Productions
- Release date: 1 December 1978
- Country: India
- Language: Telugu

Athani Kante Ghanudu is a 1978 Indian Telugu-language action drama film directed by G. C. Sekhar, produced by Adusumilli Lakshmi Kumar for Maruthi Productions starring Krishna Ghattamaneni, Jaya Prada and Kaikala Satyanarayana. Chakravarthy scored and composed the film's soundtrack.

The film released on 1 December as the thirteenth and last film release for actor Krishna in the year 1978 and emerged as a box office success.

== Cast ==
- Krishna Ghattamaneni
- Jaya Prada
- Kaikala Satyanarayana
- Rao Gopal Rao
- Sowcar Janaki
- Giri Babu
- Allu Ramalingaiah
- Jayamalini
- Chakravarthi
- P. J. Sharma
- Potti Prasad

== Music ==
Chakravarthy scored and composed the film's soundtrack which comprised 5 tracks.

- "Cheppindi Chestha" — S. P. Balasubrahmanyam, Chakravarthy
- "Tholi Kodi" — S. Janaki
- "Guthi Vankaya" — S. P. Balasubrahmanyam
- "Cheli Hrudayamlo" — S. P. Balasubrahmanyam, P. Susheela
- "Aavure Sultan" — S. P. Balasubrahmanyam, P. Susheela
