= Rani Kasula Rangamma =

- Poster
- Directed by: T. L. V. Prasad
- Written by: Dasam Gopalakrishna
- Produced by: T. Prakash Rao
- Starring: Chiranjeevi; Sridevi; Jaggayya; Nutan Prasad; Rallapalli
- Music by: K. Chakravarthy
- Release date: 1 August 1981
- Running time: 114 min
- Country: India
- Language: Telugu

Rani Kasula Rangamma is a 1981 Telugu language film starring Chiranjeevi and Sridevi.

== Plot ==
Sukumar, the son of a rich industrialist, is a spoilt man who takes advantage of innocent village girls. However, when Roja complains to his father, the two conspire to teach Sukumar a lesson.

== Cast ==
- Chiranjeevi as Sukumar Babu
- Sridevi as Rani Kasula Rangamma / Roja
- Jaggayya
- Nutan Prasad as Seetanna
- Rallapalli as Kannayya
- Allu Rama Lingaiah
- Jayamalini as Rita / Lucy in item number

== Soundtrack ==
No.	Title	Singer(s)	Length
1.	"Madiloni Mangamma"	P. Susheela, S. P. Balasubrahmanyam
2.	"Tooru Puna Sagindi"	P. Susheela
3.	"Andhangaa Vunnaavu"	P. Susheela, S. P. Balasubrahmanyam
4.	"Eyrethu Kellindi Raika"	P. Susheela, S. P. Balasubrahmanyam, Chorus
5.	"Lingu Lituku"	P. Susheela, S. P. Sailaja
