= Sarvabhoumudu =

1989 Indian Telugu film by S. S. Ravichandra

- Directed by: S. S. Ravichandra
- Screenplay by: S. S. Ravichandra
- Produced by: S. Mallikarjunarao; M. Jagannadh; D. S. Prasad
- Starring: Krishna; Radha
- Music by: Chakravarthy
- Release date: 1 September 1989
- Country: India
- Language: Telugu

Sarvabhoumudu (transl. Sovereign) is a 1989 Indian Telugu-language action film directed by S. S. Ravichandra starring Krishna and Radha in the lead roles with a musical score by Chakravarthy. The film was released on 1 September 1989.

== Cast ==
- Krishna as Dr. Sarvabhowma
- Radha as Rani
- Kaikala Satyanarayana as Kotilingam
- Gollapudi Maruthi Rao as Venkob Rao
- Kota Srinivasa Rao as Appanna
- Mallikarjuna Rao as Manta Mandel Rao
- M.V.S. Haranatha Rao as Professor Jayadev
- Tara as Usha
- Nirmalamma as Janaki, Sarvabhouma's mother
- Chakrapani as Tilak
- Chalasani Krishna Rao as D.S.P. Dhanunjaya Rao
- Vinod as Kotilingam's henchman

== Soundtrack ==
1. Aa Pakka Andam -
2. Mudduku Munduku -
3. Kotallo Baaga -
4. Poli Vo Poli -
5. Aa Chakkani Chandamama -

== Release and Reception ==
The film was released on 1 September.
