= Krishna Garadi =

1986 Telugu film by Vijaya Bapineedu

- Directed by: Vijaya Bapineedu
- Written by: Vijaya Bapineedu; Kasi Viswanath
- Produced by: Atluri Radhakrishna Murthy; Kommana Narayana Rao
- Starring: Krishna; Jaya Prada; Kaikala Satyanarayana; Rao Gopala Rao
- Cinematography: N. S. Raju
- Edited by: Atmaram
- Music by: Chakravarthy
- Production company: Srinivasa Productions
- Release date: 3 January 1986
- Country: India
- Language: Telugu

Krishna Garadi is a 1986 Indian Telugu film starring Krishna in two different roles alongside Jaya Prada, Kaikala Satyanarayana and Rao Gopala Rao in the key roles. Scripted and directed by Vijaya Bapineedu, the film had musical score by Chakravarthy. The film was released on 3 January 1986.

== Cast ==
- Krishna Ghattamaneni as Krishna
- Jaya Prada as Chittemma
- Kaikala Satyanarayana as Narayana
- Rao Gopala Rao as Idea Appa Rao
- Jaggayya as Bahadur
- Nutan Prasad
- Sowcar Janaki as Janaki
- Poornima as Padma
- Jayamalini
- Mada as Devadasu
- Potti Prasad as Ramadasu
- Nirmalamma as Idea Appa Rao's mother
- Rallapalli as Venkatasamy
- Anuradha
- Balaji as Sekhar
- Allu Ramalingaiah as Lingaiah
- P.J. Sarma

== Songs ==
Title	Singer(s)
"Naa Kallalo"	P. Susheela, Lalitha Sagari
"Chikkani Cheekatlo"	M. Ramesh, P. Susheela
"Sathyabhama Nenenuro"	P. Susheela
"Chinthalakari"	M. Ramesh, P. Susheela
"Rukminamma"	M. Ramesh, P. Susheela, S. P. Sailaja

== Release ==
The film was released on 3 January 1986.

Krishna Garadi logo contest poster
