= Chataparru =

- Village
- Interactive map of Chataparru
- Location in Andhra Pradesh, India Chataparru (India)
- Coordinates: 16°41′54″N 81°08′28″E
- Country: India
- State: Andhra Pradesh
- District: Eluru

Population (2011)
  - Total: 7,273

Languages
  - Official: Telugu
- Time zone: UTC+5:30 (IST)
- Postal code: 534 004
- Vehicle registration: AP
- Vidhan Sabha constituency: Denduluru

Chataparru is a village in Eluru mandal of Eluru district, Andhra Pradesh, India. Veteran Telugu film producer Vijaya Bapineedu and Telugu film actor Murali Mohan were born in this village. Government of Andhra Pradesh selected this village as Smart Village.

== Demographics ==
According to Indian census, 2001, the demographic details of this village is as follows:

- Total Population : 7273 in 1,764 Households.
- Male Population : 3608 and Female Population: 3665
- Children Under 6-years: 772 (Boys - 379 and Girls - 393)
- Total Literates : 5389

== Transport ==
Chataparru is well connected to Eluru by road. APS RTC operates bus services from Eluru and Bhimavaram to this region. Eluru is its nearest railway station connecting major cities.
