= Murali Mohan =

Indian actor, producer, politician, and businessman

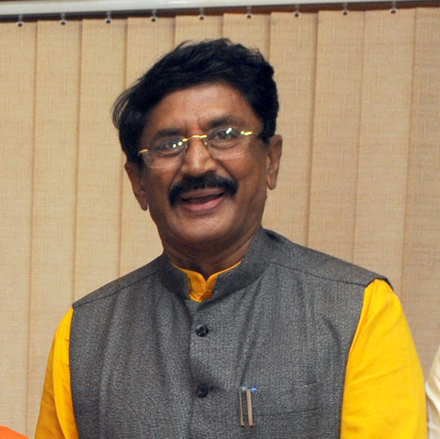
- Murali Mohan in 2016 at New Delhi
- Born: Maganti Raja Ram Mohan Roy; 24 June 1940 (age 86); Chataparru, Madras Presidency, British India
- Political party: Telugu Desam Party
- Spouse: Vijaya Lakshmi
- Children: 2
- Awards: Padma Shri (2026)

Member of Parliament, Lok Sabha
- In office 2014–2019
- Preceded by: Vundavalli Aruna Kumar
- Succeeded by: Margani Bharat
- Constituency: Rajahmundry Lok Sabha constituency

Maganti Murali Mohan (born as Maganti Raja Ram Mohan Roy; 24 June 1940) is an Indian actor, producer, politician, philanthropist, and businessman known for his works in Telugu cinema, television and construction. In a career spanning more than 40 years Murali Mohan acted in around 350 films in a variety of roles. He has served in various positions in the NFDC and the Andhra Pradesh Film Development Corporation. He was the Honorary President of the Telugu Movie Artists Association until the elections in 2015.

In 1980 he formed his own film production company, Jayabheri Arts, with his brother Kishore. His first film as producer was Vaarala Abbay, directed by Raja Chandra. This was Murali Mohan's 100th film. The company produced 25 films. He is the chairman of the construction company Jayabheri Group.

He has also been active in politics for the Telugu Desam Party. He contested the 15th Loksabha elections in 2009 as the TDP candidate from Rajahmundry parliamentary constituency of Andhra Pradesh, eventually losing to the Indian National Congress candidate Vundavalli Aruna Kumar by just 2,147 votes. In 2014, he won the 16th Loksabha elections as a member of Parliament from Rajamahendravaram. A recipient of 3 state Nandi Awards, he was awarded the Padma Shri, India's fourth highest civilian honour, for his contribution to Indian cinema in 2026.

== Personal life ==
Maganti Murali Mohan was born as Raja Ram Mohan Roy on 24 June 1940 in Chataparru to Maganti Madhava Rao, an Indian freedom fighter. He did his schooling in Eluru. He shifted gears in 1963 and started his own business dealing in electrical motors and oil engines. He then ventured into stage acting in Vijayawada. Murali Mohan is married to Vijaya Lakshmi, with whom he has a daughter, Madhu Bindhu, and a son Ram Mohan.

== Philanthropy ==
The Murali Mohan Charitable Trust provides free education for people who secure 85% in both SSC and intermediate and below 10,000 rank in EAMCET or any other preferred entrance tests. The students will be taken into consideration only after full-fledged screening for their financial status and community. The trust is focused on encouraging students of any community who are financially poor. Since its inception the trust has adopted nearly 10,000 students of engineering and medicine.

== Filmography ==
- Jagame Maya (1973)
- Neramu Siksha (1973)
- Tirupati (1974)
- Radhamma Pelli (1974) as Murali Mohan
- Devudu Chesina Pelli (1975) as Raju
- Vayasochina Pilla (1975)
- Jebu Donga (1975)
- Balipeetam (1975)
- Bharatamlo Oka Ammayi (1975)
- Babu (1975)
- Lakshmana Rekha (1975)
- Jyothi (1976)
- Raju Vedale (1976)
- Poruginti Pulla Koora (1976)
- O Manishi Thirigi Chudu (1976)
- Thoorpu Padamara (1976)
- Yavvanam Katesindi (1976)
- Neram Nadhikadu Akalidi (1976)
- Muddabhanti Puvvu (1976)
- Mahatmudu (1976)
- Kalpana (1977)
- Tholirey Gadichindi (1977)
- Premalekhalu (1977)
- Idekadi Nyayam (1977)
- Rambha Urvasi Menaka (1977)
- Devathalara Deevinchandi (1977)
- Gadusu Ammayi (1977)
- Amaradeepam (1977)
- Chillarakottu Chitamma (1977)
- Aame Katha (1977)
- Jagadguru Aadisankaran (1977) (Malayalam)
- Dongala Dopidi (1978) as Sivam
- Pottelu Punnamma (1978) as Vijay Kumar
- Manavoori Pandavulu (1978)
- Manitharil Ithanai Nirangalah! (1978) (Tamil)
- Sivaranjani (1978)
- Kalyani (1979)
- Urvasi Neeve Naa Preyasi (1979) as Vasu
- Seeta Ramudaithe (1979)
- Ramudu Ravanudaithe (1979)
- Naa Illu Naa Vaalu (1979)
- Muddula Koduku (1979)
- Maa Voollo Mahasivudu (1979) as Ravi
- Korikale Gurralaite (1979)
- Needa (1979)
- Pelli Gola (1980) as Sekhar
- Sujata (1980)
- Nippulanti Nijam (1980)
- Mangala Gauri (1980)
- Kaliyuga Ravana Surudu (1980)
- Kaksha (1980)
- Lakshmi (1980)
- Podarillu (1980)
- Buchi Babu (1980)
- Yuvatharam Kadhilindi (1980)
- Chesina Basalu (1980)
- Deepardhana (1980)
- Bhokna Shankar's (1980)
- Vaaralabbai (1981) (100th Film)
- Dabbu Dabbu Dabbu (1981)
- Swarnappakshikal (1981) (Malayalam)
- Erra Mallelu (1981)
- Prema Natakam (1981) as Kumar
- Premabhishekam (1981)
- Asha Jyoti (1981)
- Addala Meda (1981)
- Jayasudha (1982)
- Manishiko Charithra (1982)
- Chandamama (1982)
- Ramayanamlo Pidakala Vera (1982)
- Yuvaraju (1982)
- Prathikaram (1982) as Srikanth
- Bobbili Puli (1982)
- Rudrakali (1983)
- Picchipanthulu (1983)
- Maro Maya Baazar (1983)
- Andhra Kesari (1983)
- Kotikokkadu (1983)
- Durga Devi (1983) as Murali
- Devi Sridevi (1983)
- Adadani Saval (1983)
- Bhale Ramudu (1984)
- Seethamma Pelli (1984)
- Nirdoshi (1984)
- Manishiko Charitra (1984)
- Kutumba Gauravam (1984) as Satyam
- Justice Chakravarthy (1984)
- Alaya Deepam (1984)
- Chiranjeevi (1985) as Venu
- Shrimati Garu (1985)
- O Thandri Theerpu (1985)
- Mugguru Mithrulu (1985)
- Sri Shirdi Saibaba Mahatyam (1986)
- Karpura Deepam (1986)
- Ide Naa Samadhanam (1986) as Bhuvanagiri Bhavani Prasad
- Sravana Meghalu (1986)
- Kirayi Dada (1987)
- Trimurtulu (1987) as Cameo
- Aatma Bandhuvulu (1987)
- Collector Vijaya (1988)
- Nyayanaki Sankellu (1988)
- Chinababu (1988)
- Prithviraj (1988) as Mohan
- Navabharata (1988)
- Rao Gari Illu (1988)
- Trinetrudu (1988)
- Mugguru Kodukulu (1988)
- Yudda Bhoomi (1988)
- Kaliyuga Karnudu (1988) as Satyam
- Bharatha Nari (1989)
- Siva (1989)
- Gudachari 117 (1989)
- Muthyamantha Muddu (1989)
- Sutradharulu (1989)
- Magadu (1990)
- Seetharamaiah Gari Manavaralu (1991)
- Gang Leader (1991)
- Taraka Prabhuni Deeksha Mahimalu (1991)
- Nirnayam (1991)
- Vidhata (1991) as Gandhi
- Pellam Chepithe Vinali (1992)
- Allari Alludu (1993)
- Prema Pusthakam (1993)
- Chirunavvula Varamistava (1993)
- Kalachakram (1993)
- Theerpu (1994)
- Jailor Gari Abbayi (1994)
- Gharana Bullodu (1995)
- Aayanaki Iddaru (1995)
- Mayabazaar (1995)
- Oho Na Pellanta (1996)
- Sampradayam (1996) as Advocate to Bhupathi Raja
- Super Heroes (1997)
- Sri Sitaramula Kalyanam Chutamu Rarandi (1998)
- Chandralekha (1998)
- Neti Gandhi (1999)
- English Pellam East Godavari Mogudu (1999)
- Prematho Raa (2001)
- Chinna (2001)
- Preminchu (2001)
- Raghavendra (2003)
- Vijayam (2003)
- Vishnu (2003)
- Lakshmi Narasimha (2004)
- Arjun (2004)
- Bhadra (2005)
- Allari Bullodu (2005)
- Relax (2005)
- Bommarillu (2006)
- Adhineta (2009)
- Bangaru Babu (2009)
- Om Shanti (2010)
- Mr. Perfect (2011)
- Raaj (2011)
- Sri Rama Rajyam (2011)
- Seethamma Vakitlo Sirimalle Chettu (2013)
- Erra Bus (2014)
- Subramanyam For Sale (2014)
- Mukunda (2014)
- Supreme (2016)
- Okkadu Migiladu (2017)
- Jai Simha (2018)
- Godfather (2022)
- Ustaad Bhagat Singh (2026)

== Television ==
Year	Title	Role	Language	Channel
2009–2011	Raktha Sambandham		Telugu	Gemini TV
2012–2014	Aahvaanam		Telugu	Gemini TV
2018–2019	Lakshmi Stores	Mahalingam	Tamil	Sun TV
2019	Lakshmi Stores	Sadashivam	Telugu	Gemini TV
2019	Roja	Mahalingam (Cameo Appearance)	Tamil	Sun TV
2021	Parampara		Telugu	Disney+ Hotstar
2024	Chiranjeevi Lakshmi Sowbhagyavathi	JMR (cameo appearance)	Telugu	Zee Telugu

== Awards ==
Civilian honors

- Padma Shri (2026)

Nandi Awards

- Best Actor - Oh Thandri Theerpu (1985)
- Best Supporting Actor - Preminchu (2001)
- Best Supporting Actor - Vegu Chukkalu (2003)

Others

- SIIMA Lifetime Achievement Award - 2017
