= Tingu Rangadu =

- Theatrical poster
- Directed by: T. L. V. Prasad
- Starring: Chiranjeevi; Geetha; Jaggayya; Nutan Prasad; Sowcar Janaki
- Music by: K. Chakravarthy
- Release date: 1 October 1982
- Country: India
- Language: Telugu

Tingu Rangadu (Telugu: టింగు రంగడు) is a 1982 Telugu film directed by Tatineni Prasad. The film stars Chiranjeevi, Geetha, Jaggayya, Nutan Prasad, and Sowcar Janaki. The film was released on the same day as Patnam Vachina Pativrathalu (1982).

== Plot ==
Rangadu is a carefree guy who lives with his grandmother and his cousin. One day he escapes from his house and lands in a city. He gets into Ramchandra Rao’s house claiming to be his son, through his extra-marital relationship. Ramachandra Rao refuses to believe him, but his wife Janaki lets him stay in their house. The couple tests Rangadu in all possible ways but he never succumbs to any thing. Janaki's cousin Bhupati stays in their house with his children, Nutan Prasad and Radha and takes care of all their business affairs. He plans to let childless couple, Ramachandrarao and Janaki, adopt his son, so that he can usurp their property. Unable to withstand Rangadu's claim as their son, Bhushanam too tries every trick possible to kick him out of the house, but fails. Meanwhile, Rangadu manages to win over the couple's hearts and they decide to adopt him as their son. His grandmother gets this news and rushes to see him. Here, she reveals that Rangadu is Ramachandrarao's elder brother's son and how the couple saved Rangadu's mother. Bhushanam traps the family and tries to grab the property, but Rangadu rescues everyone, and in the effort marries his cousin Radha.

== Cast ==
- Chiranjeevi as Rangadu
- Geetha as Radha
- Jaggayya as Ramchandra Rao
- Nutan Prasad
- Sowcar Janaki as Janaki
- Nirmalamma as Rangadu's grandmother
- Nagabhushanam as Bhupati
