= Vijaya Bapineedu =

Indian filmmaker (1936–2019)

- Born: Gutta Bapineedu Chowdary; 22 September 1936; Chataparru, Eluru, Andhra Pradesh, India
- Died: 11 February 2019 (aged 82); Hyderabad, Telangana, India
- Occupations: Film director; film producer; screenwriter; magazine editor; novelist
- Years active: 1970s–1990s
- Relatives: Vallabhaneni Janardhan (son-in-law)

Gutta Bapineedu Chowdary (22 September 1936 – 11 February 2019), popularly known as Vijaya Bapineedu, was an Indian film director, producer, screenwriter, publisher, and novelist known for his works in Telugu cinema.

Bapineedu began his career by writing detective stories and later launched the popular magazine Vijaya, which was noted for its unique format and extensive content. This success earned him the nickname 'Vijaya' Bapineedu. He further expanded his publishing career with several successful ventures, including the children's magazine Bommarillu, and authored several novels.

His success as a writer led him to the film industry, where some of his novels were adapted into movies. Transitioning to cinema, Bapineedu co-founded the production company Syam Prasad Arts in partnership with Maganti Ravindranath Chowdary. He went on to produce or present notable films such as Yavvanam Kaatesindi (1976), Bommarillu (1978), Bottu-Kaatuka (1979), and Patnam Vachina Pativrathalu (1982).

Bapineedu's involvement in film production eventually led him to direction, where he helmed around 25 films. He is especially celebrated for his successful collaborations with Chiranjeevi, directing successful films like Maga Maharaju (1983), Hero (1984), Khaidi No. 786 (1988) and Gang Leader (1991). His other notable directorial works include Bharyamani (1984), Maharaju (1985), Krishna Garadi (1986), Nakoo Pellam Kavali (1987), Donga Kollu (1988), and Valu Jada Tholu Beltu (1992). Beyond his directorial achievements, Bapineedu also introduced new talent to the industry, including lyricist Bhuvana Chandra and writer Y. Kasi Viswanath.

== Early life ==
Bapineedu was born on 22 September 1936 to Seetha Ramaswamy and Leelavathy in Chataparru village near Eluru in Andhra Pradesh. He completed his B.A. in Mathematics from C. R. R. College, Eluru.

== Publishing career ==
Bapineedu began his career as a clerk in the Zilla Parishad office, where his passion for storytelling led him to write detective stories under a pseudonym. His witty and engaging narratives gained significant popularity during the late 1960s and 1970s, resulting in the publication of over 70 stories in leading vernacular dailies. Believing that self-publishing would be more profitable, he resigned from his job and moved to Madras with his family. There, he met already established writers like Viswa Prasad and Kommuri. When they advised him that publishing detective novels might not be profitable, Bapineedu launched the monthly magazine Vijaya instead. This magazine, featuring sections on comedy, stories, and cinema—including popular film reviews and box office reports—became widely popular and earned him the nickname 'Vijaya' Bapineedu. He further expanded his publishing efforts by introducing other successful magazines, including the children's periodical Bommarillu and magazines like Ramani, and Radhika. He also served as the editor for Indian Film and Neelima magazines.

== Film career ==
Bapineedu's success as a writer naturally extended into the film industry. His transition to cinema began when Phalguna Productions adapted his story Jagath Jetteelu (1970) into a film. Following this, another one of his novels was adapted into the film Hanthakulu Devanthakulu (1972). Bapineedu's deep interest in cinema was further evidenced by his meticulous habit of noting details about every film he watched and reinterpreting sequences—a practice that became well-known and respected among Telugu film enthusiasts.

=== Production ===
Bapineedu’s foray into film production was influenced by his cousin, Gutta Ramineedu, and his own involvement with the film industry through his magazines. He initially collaborated with Y. Sunil Chowdary to produce Balipeetam (1975), which was a notable success.

Following this, Bapineedu acquired the rights to the Tamil film Mayangukiral Oru Madhu (1975), intending to remake it in Telugu as Chedina Aadadi (transl. Spoilt woman). However, objections from P. Pullayya, a member of the Censor Board, led to a title change to Yavvanam Katesindi (1976). The film, presented by Bapineedu, produced by Maganti Ravindranath Chowdary, and directed by Dasari Narayana Rao, was a major hit. Building on this success, Bapineedu released a dubbed and more concise version of the Tamil film Manmadha Leelai (1976) into Telugu, which gained popularity despite initial reservations from the original director, K. Balachander.

Vijaya Bapineedu was the first to use the term "Nirmanatha" (Production Management) in Telugu cinema and was credited as such, setting a new standard for film production. He was also known for his experimental approach to filmmaking. He often explored unconventional formats, such as merging two short films into a single release. A significant example of this innovation was when he acquired the rights to a Kannada and a Malayalam film and combined them by shooting additional scenes to create a unified movie—a pioneering technique in Indian cinema. Another instance of his experimental spirit was with the film Rudra Thandavam, starring Sarath Babu. Bapineedu chose to release the film exclusively in Visakhapatnam initially, with plans to expand based on audience feedback. However, due to poor reviews, the film was not released in other regions.

He went on to produce or present other notable films such as Bommarillu (1978), Bottu-Kaatuka (1979), and Patnam Vachina Pativrathalu (1982).

=== Direction ===
Bapineedu made his directorial debut with Maga Maharaju (1983) after the original director, Moulee, was unable to adjust his schedule. The film, starring Chiranjeevi, became a significant commercial success. Bapineedu reportedly gifted Chiranjeevi an elephant at the 100-day function of the film. Maga Maharaju marked the beginning of Bapineedu's directorial career.

Bapineedu is particularly noted for his successful collaboration with Chiranjeevi. He co-produced Patnam Vachina Pativrathalu (1982), which featured Chiranjeevi as a co-lead. Following the success of Maga Maharaju, Bapineedu directed several hit films with Chiranjeevi, including Hero (1984), Magadheerudu (1986), Khaidi No. 786 (1988), and Gang Leader (1991). Gang Leader was particularly notable for becoming the highest-grossing Telugu film at the time. These films not only solidified Chiranjeevi's star status but also established Bapineedu as a prominent director in the Telugu film industry.

Chiranjeevi recalled that when he moved to Hyderabad, Bapineedu offered him accommodation at his guesthouse, where he stayed for a long period. Chiranjeevi also noted that Bapineedu preferred working with him and felt most comfortable making films together. Their successful collaboration led Bapineedu to launch a magazine named Chiranjeevi, dedicated exclusively to the actor's films and featuring colour photos. Although the magazine was discontinued, it remains notable as the only offset colour magazine published in a film star's name.

Throughout his career, Bapineedu directed several other prominent actors in the Telugu film industry. He worked with Sobhan Babu in films like Bharyamani (1984), Maharaju (1985), Kongu Mudi (1985), and Punnami Chandrudu (1987); Rajendra Prasad in Nakoo Pellam Kavali (1987), Donga Kollu (1988), Valu Jada Tholu Beltu (1992), and Seetapathi, Chalo Tirupathi! (1992); and Krishna in Krishna Garadi (1985) and Maharajasri Mayagadu (1988).

Beyond his directorial achievements, Bapineedu also introduced new talent to the industry, including directors Durga Nageswara Rao, G. Rammohan Rao, Vallabhaneni Janardhan, Moulee, lyricist Bhuvana Chandra, music director Saluri Vasu Rao, and dialogue writer Y. Kasi Viswanath.

== Production house ==
Bapineedu produced most of his films under the Syam Prasad Arts banner in partnership with Maganti Ravindranath Chowdary. Their friendship, which began in childhood as schoolmates, strengthened over the years. While Bapineedu was working as a clerk at the Zilla Parishad, he reconnected with Chowdary, whose father was the chairman at the time. They named their film production company in memory of their close friend Syam, who had planned to start a business with them in Madras but died before the venture could begin. The first film produced under this banner was Yavvanam Kaatesindi (1976).

== Personal life ==
Bapineedu was married to his wife, Vijaya, and the couple had four daughters. Actor and director Vallabhaneni Janardhan was his son-in-law. Bapineedu suffered from Alzheimer's disease for the last four years of his life and was receiving treatment at Apollo Hospitals, Hyderabad. He died at his residence in Hyderabad on 11 February 2019, at the age of 82.

== Filmography ==
=== Director ===
- Maga Maharaju (1983)
- Hero (1984)
- Mahanagaramlo Mayagadu (1984)
- Bharyamani (1984)
- Kongu Mudi (1985)
- Maharaju (1985)
- Dongallo Dora (1985)
- Krishna Garadi (1986)
- Magadheerudu (1986)
- Police Officer (1986)
- Punnami Chandrudu (1987)
- Nakoo Pellam Kavali (1987)
- Maa Inti Maharaju (1988)
- Donga Kollu (1988)
- Khaidi No.786 (1988)
- Maharajasri Mayagadu (1988)
- Sumangali (1989)
- Joo Lakataka (1989)
- Mahajananiki Maradalu Pilla (1990)
- Gang Leader (1991)
- Valu Jada Tholu Beltu (1992)
- Seetapathi Chalo Tirupathi (1992)
- Big Boss (1995)
- Family (1996)
- Kodukulu (1998)

Production

- Yavvanam Katesindi (1976) - executive producer
- Manmadha Leelai (1976) (Note: Dubbed film) - executive producer
- Ramba Urvasi Menaka (1977) - executive producer
- Rudra Thandavam
- Bommarillu (1978) - executive producer
- Prema Pujari and Maro Ahalya (1978) (Note: Dubbed film)
- Bottu-Kaatuka (1979)
- Vijaya (1979) - executive producer
- Gutiloni Ramachiluka (1980) - executive producer
- Jegantalu (1981) - producer
- Dabbu Dabbu Dabbu (1981)
- Patnam Vachina Pativrathalu (1982)
- Vishakanya (1985) - presented by

Writer

- Jagath Jetteelu (1970)
- Hanthakulu Devanthakulu (1972)
- Rambha Urvasi Menaka (1977)
- Bottu-Kaatuka (1979)
- Gutiloni Ramachiluka (1980)
- Jegantalu (1981)
- Dabbu Dabbu Dabbu (1981)
- Maga Maharaju (1983)
- Mahanagaramlo Mayagadu (1984)
- Maharaju (1985)
- Krishna Garadi (1986)
- Nakoo Pellam Kavali (1987)
- Maa Inti Maharaju (1988)
- Khaidi No.786 (1988)
- Donga Kollu (1988)
- Mahajananiki Maradalu Pilla (1990) (Note: Writer and directorial supervision)
- Gang Leader (1991)
- Valu Jada Tholu Beltu (1992)
- Seetapathi Chalo Tirupathi (1992)
- Kodukulu (1998)
