= Kaikala Satyanarayana =

Indian actor and politician (1935–2022)

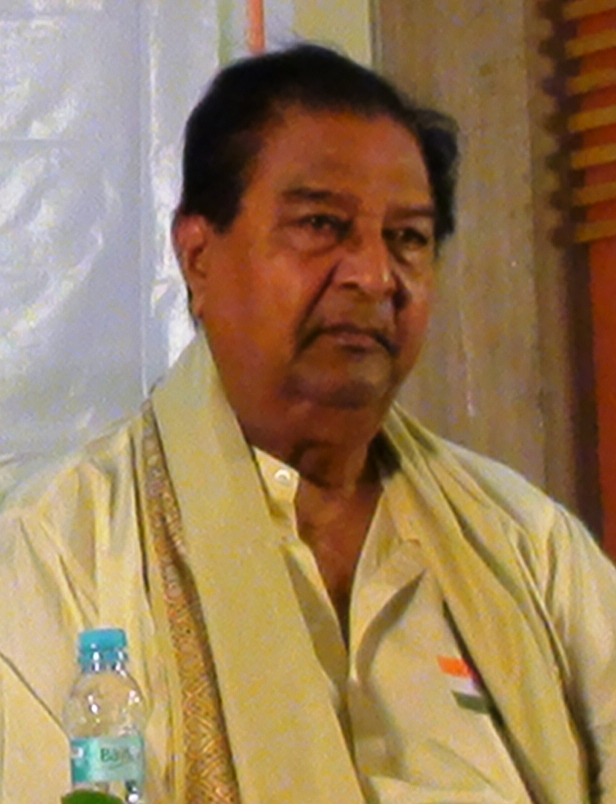
- Born: 25 July 1935; Kavutaram, Madras Presidency, British India
- Died: 23 December 2022 (aged 87); Hyderabad, Telangana, India
- Occupations: Actor; producer; director; politician
- Years active: 1959–2022
- Political party: Telugu Desam Party
- Spouse: Nageswaramma (m. 1960)
- Children: 4
- Awards: Nandi Award for Best Feature Film

Member of Parliament, Lok Sabha
- In office 1996–1998
- Preceded by: Kolusu Peda Reddaiah
- Succeeded by: Kavuri Samba Siva Rao
- Constituency: Machilipatnam

Kaikala Satyanarayana (25 July 1935 – 23 December 2022) was an Indian actor, producer, and politician who predominantly worked in Telugu cinema. He appeared in more than 750 films over six decades. He was a recipient of the Raghupathi Venkaiah Award in 2011, and the Filmfare Lifetime Achievement Award in 2017. Renowned for his acting prowess across a range of roles and genres, he was given the epithet Navarasa Natana Sarvabhouma (transl. Universal monarch of acting in nine rasas).

He served as the Member of Parliament in the 11th Lok Sabha representing Machilipatnam constituency from the Telugu Desam Party.

== Early life ==
Kaikala Satyanarayana was born on 25 July 1935 to Kaikala Laxmi Narayana from Kavutaram village in Krishna district. Having completed his primary education in Gudlavalleru and intermediate education in Vijayawada, Satyanarayana graduated from Gudivada College.

== Career ==
Satyanarayana was first noticed by D. L. Narayana, who offered him a role in his film Sipayi Koothuru directed by Changayya in 1959. Though it did not do well at the box office, he was noticed for his resemblance to N.T. Rama Rao. They found him as a prospective candidate to play dupe to NTR. Satyanarayana aptly fitted that place. He played dupe to NTR in several movies. NTR offered Satyanarayana a role in his film Apoorva Sahasra Siraccheda Chintamani in 1960, directed by S. D. Lal. Satyanarayana played the role of a prince.

B. Vittalacharya cast him in a negative role in Kanaka Durga Pooja Mahima. He fit the role to the T. From then on, Satyanarayana established himself in villain roles.

Satyanarayana established Rama Films production house and made films such as Kodama Simham (1990), Bangaru Kutumbam (1994), and Muddula Mogudu (1997). He went on to appear in over 750 films.

In 1996, he stepped into politics with TDP winning Lok Sabha elections from Machilipatnam constituency.

In 2012, he served as the jury member for South Region II at the 59th National Film Awards.

== Personal life and death ==
Satyanarayana married Nageswaramma on 10 April 1960. The couple had two daughters and two sons.

Satyanarayana died on 23 December 2022, at the age of 87.

== Awards ==
Filmfare Awards

- Lifetime Achievement Award (2017)

Nandi Awards

- Best Feature Film – Bangaru Kutumbam (1994)
- Raghupathi Venkaiah Award – 2011

Other honours

- NTR Vignan Trust Award
- Natasekhara, given by Non Government Organization (NGO) in Anantapur and Gudivada Municipal Civic Center

== Filmography ==
=== As producer ===
- Tara Sasankam (1969)
- Bangaru Kutumbam (1994)
- Iddaru Dongalu (1984)

=== As actor ===
==== Telugu films ====
List of film acting credits
Year	Title	Role	Notes
1959	Sipayi Kuthuru		
1960	Raja Makutam		
1960	Sahasra Siracheda Apoorva Chinthamani	Satyaseela Maharaju	
1960	Kanakadurga Pooja Mahima	Martanda Varma	
1962	Madana Kamaraju Katha	Narendra Varma	
1962	Bhishma		
1963	Sri Krishnarjuna Yudham	Karna	
1963	Lava Kusa	Bharata	
1963	Somavara Vrata Mahatyam	Nagaraju, King of Nagas	
1963	Paruvu Prathishta		
1963	Tirupathamma Katha		
1963	Narthanasala	Dussasana	
1964	Navagraha Pooja Mahima		
1964	Aggi Pidugu	Vedanda	
1964	Desa Drohulu		
1965	Pakkalo Ballem		
1965	Jwala Dweepa Rahasyam		
1965	Aakasa Ramanna		
1965	Pandava Vanavasam	Ghatotkacha	
1965	Vijaya Simha	Father of Vijaya Simha	
1965	Aada Brathuku		
1965	Veera Abhimanyu		
1965	Dorikithe Dongalu		
1966	Sri Krishna Pandaveeyam	Rukmi	
1966	Bhimanjaneya Yuddham		
1966	Aata Bommalu		
1966	Paramanandayya Sishyula Katha		
1966	Bhulokamlo Yamalokam		
1966	Loguttu Perumallukeruka	Nagu	
1966	Srimathi		
1966	Mohini Bhasmasura	Bali Chakravarthy	
1967	Paramanandayya Sishyula Katha	Jaggarayudu	
1967	Ummadi Kutumbam		
1967	Sri Krishnavataram	Duryodhanudu	
1967	Pattukunte Padivelu	Narasimham aka Nasiruddin	
1967	Chikkadu Dorakadu		
1967	Nirdoshi		
1967	Aggi Dora	Bhujanga Devudu	
1967	Nindu Manasulu		
1968	Aggi Meeda Guggilam	Sekataludu	
1968	Devudichina Bharthalu		
1968	Ramu		
1968	Sri Rama Katha		
1968	Kalisochina Adrushtam		
1968	Chuttarikalu		
1968	Nadamantrapu Siri		
1968	Veeranjaneya	Garuda	
1968	Attagaru Kotha Kodalu		
1968	Evaru Monagadu	Anand	
1969	Sri Rama Katha	Ravana	
1969	Bhale Rangadu	Seshu	
1969	Ekaveera		
1969	Natakalarayudu		
1969	Sattekalapu Satteyya		
1969	Raja Simha	Makarakundarudu	
1969	Ukku Pidugu	Marthanda	
1969	Bhale Abbayilu	Prathap	
1969	Varakatnam		
1970	Kathanayika Molla	Sri Krishna Devaraya	
1970	Lakshmi Kataksham	Prachandudu	
1970	Kodalu Diddina Kapuram		
1970	Pettandarulu		
1971	Rowdilaku Rowdilu	Dr. Banerji	
1971	Sampoorna Ramayanam	Meghanadha	
1971	Revolver Rani	Vikram	
1971	Mattilo Manikyam	Bheemayya	
1971	Bangaru Kutumbam		
1971	Prema Nagar	Keshav	
1971	Pattindalla Bangaram	Ringer	
1971	Raitu Bidda		
1971	Sati Anasuya		
1972	Tata Manavadu		
1972	Hanthakulu Devanthakulu	Balaram	
1972	Raitu Kutubum		
1972	Papam Pasivaadu		
1972	Kiladi Bullodu	Bhupal Rao	
1972	Pilla? Piduga?	Raaka	
1972	Manavudu Danavudu	Bhujangam	
1972	Monagadostunnadu Jagratha	Nagaraju	
1973	Dabbuku Lokam Dasoham		
1973	Devudu Chesina Manushulu		
1973	Manchi Vallaki Manchivadu	Sethupati	
1973	Neramu Siksha		
1973	Samsaram Sagaram		
1973	Desoddharakulu		
1974	Gundelu Teesina Monagadu		
1974	Intinti Katha	Ravi	
1975	Devude Digivaste		
1975	Yamagola	Yamadharma raju	
1975	Jeevana Jyoti		
1975	Ammayila Sapatham		
1975	Bhagasthulu	Satyanarayana	
1975	Soggadu		
1975	Babu		
1976	Sita Kalyanam	Ravana	
1976	Andharu Bagundali	Suryam	
1976	Secretary		
1976	Manushulanta Okkate		
1976	Vintha Illu Santha Gola		
1976	Siri Siri Muvva	Rudriah	
1977	Jeevithame Oka Natakarangam		
1977	Janma Janmala Bandham		
1977	Moratodu		
1977	Premalekhalu		
1977	Adavi Ramudu		
1977	Edureetha		
1977	Daana Veera Soora Karna	Bhima	
1977	Kurukshetram	Duryodhana	
1977	Savasagallu		
1977	Seetha Rama Vanavasam		
1977	Gadusu Pillodu	Raghavaiah	
1977	Khaidi Kalidasu	I.G. Vishwanath	
1978	Mugguru Muggure	Bhagawan	
1978	Dongala Veta	Tiger	
1978	Nayudu Bava	Purushottama Rao	
1978	Kalanthakulu	Sathyam	
1978	Patnavasam	Balaram	
1978	Nindu Manishi	Puliraju	
1978	Sahasavanthudu	Meesala Rangaiah	
1978	Pranam Khareedu		
1978	Siri Siri Muvva		
1978	Katakatala Rudraiah		
1978	Kumara Raja		
1978	Yuga Purushudu		
1978	Lawyer Viswanath		
1979	Tayaramma Bangarayya	Bangarayya	
1979	Anthuleni Vintha Katha	Manohara Murthy	
1979	Kothala Raayudu		
1979	Vetagadu	Hari	
1979	Sri Tirupati Venkateswara Kalyanam		
1979	Kalyani		
1979	Maa Voollo Mahasivudu	Sambayya	
1979	Driver Ramudu		
1979	Dongalaku Saval	Sathyam/No. 2	
1979	Kukka Katuku Cheppu Debba		
1979	Mande Gundelu		
1979	Yugandhar		
1979	Samajaniki Saval	Ranganna aka Ranga Rao	
1979	Amma Evarikaina Amma	Himself	
1980	Mahalakshmi	Prabhakar Rao	
1980	Bhale Krishnudu		
1980	Adrushtavanthudu	Kesava Rao	
1980	Mosagadu	Ramachandraiah	
1980	Kaali	Rajaram	
1980	Nakili Manishi		
1980	Kottapeta Rowdy	Punyakoti	
1980	Thathayya Premaleelalu		
1980	Prema Tarangalu		
1980	Mama Allulla Saval	Chandrasekhar	
1980	Sri Vinayaka Vijayamu	Mooshikasura	
1980	Superman		
1980	Sardar Papa Rayudu		
1980	Bangaru Bava		
1980	Bhale Kapuram		
1980	Challenge Ramudu		
1981	Prema Simhasanam	Ramanadham	
1981	Gaja Donga		
1981	Swargam	Raghunath	
1981	Puli Bidda	Sasibhushana Rao	
1981	Agni Poolu		
1981	Parvathi Parameswarulu		
1981	Kirayi Rowdylu		
1981	Kondaveeti Simham	Nagaraju	
1981	Jagamondi	God	
1981	Ragile Jwala		
1982	Bangaru Bhoomi	Bose Babu	
1982	Iddaru Kodukulu	S.P. Chowdary	
1982	Vamsa Gouravam	Nataraju	
1982	Bangaru Koduku	Nagaraju	
1982	Jagannatha Rathachakralu	Ramu	
1982	Kayyala Ammayi Kalavari Abbayi	Vishwanatham	
1982	Subhalekha	Ankella Adiseshayya	
1982	Yamakinkarudu		
1982	Mondi Ghatam		
1982	Justice Chowdary	Papa Rao & Ranga Rao (Dualrole)	
1982	Doctor Cine Actor	Srikanth	
1982	Devatha		
1982	Bobbili Puli	Sanyasi	
1982	Kaliyuga Ramudu		
1982	Pratigna	Nagaraju	
1982	Kalavari Samsaram	Kodhandaramayya	
1982	Golconda Abbulu	Satyam	
1982	Pagabattina Simham	Ranga	
1983	Puli Bebbuli		
1983	Idhi Kaadu Mugimpu	Kutumba Rao	
1983	Chanda Sasanudu		
1983	Sangharshana		
1983	Moogavani Paga	President Papa Rao	
1983	Oorantha Sankranthi	Raghavaiah	
1983	Mugguru Ammayila Mogudu	Raagala Gopal Rao	
1983	Aalaya Sikharam	Satyamurthy	
1983	Manthri Gari Viyyankudu	Kappala Appa Rao	
1983	Palleturi Pidugu	Bhujangam	
1983	Sangharshana		
1983	Sri Ranga Neethulu	Narayana Murthy	
1983	Muddula Mogudu	Gopal Rao	
1983	Mundadugu	Kamaraju	
1983	Adavi Simhalu	Hari	
1983	Siripuram Monagadu		
1983	Ramarajyamlo Bheemaraju	Lakshmipathi	
1983	Prajarajyam	Sivaramaiah	
1983	Pelli Choopulu		
1983	Lanke Bindelu	Garikapati Gangaiah	
1984	Palnati Puli	Bhupathi	
1984	Sardar	Pavithra Pavana Murthy	
1984	Iddaru Dongalu		
1984	Goonda	S.P. Ananda Rao	
1984	Hero		
1984	Inti Guttu		
1984	Yuddham	Parvathalu	
1984	Rustum		
1984	Raktha Sambandham		
1984	Janani Janmabhoomi		
1984	Kondaveeti Nagulu	Papa Rayudu	
1984	Bharatamlo Sankharavam		
1984	Chadarangam	Bhanoji	
1984	Nayakulaku Saval	Tiger Bhujangam	
1984	Bobbili Brahmanna		
1984	Srimadvirat Veerabrahmendra Swamy Charitra	Kakka	
1984	Bhale Ramudu	Dharmanna	
1984	Naagu	Parvathalu	
1984	Rowdy	Raghunath	
1984	Raraju		
1984	Mukkopi		
1984	Kutumba Gowravam	Rama Rao	
1984	Dongalu Baboi Dongalu	Damodaram	
1984	Dandayatra	Subrahmanyam	
1984	Danavudu	Jagannatham	
1985	Agni Parvatam		
1985	Chattamtho Poratam	Narayana	
1985	Chiranjeevi	Commissioner Narayana Rao	
1985	Jwala		
1985	Puli	Pratap Rao	
1985	Mayadari Maridi		
1985	Raktha Sindhuram		
1985	Aalaapana		
1985	Pelli Meeku Akshintalu Naaku		
1985	Vijetha		
1985	Nerasthudu	Narahari	
1985	Palnati Simham	Neelakanthama Naidu	
1985	Muchataga Mugguru		
1985	Siksha		
1985	Jackie		
1985	Anveshana		
1985	Preminchu Pelladu		
1985	Surya Chandra	Narayana Rao	
1985	Aggiraju	Simhalu	
1986	Krishna Garadi	Narayana	
1986	Driver Babu	Madhava Rao	
1986	Ukku Manishi	Nagaraju	
1986	Kondaveeti Raja		
1986	Manavudu Danavudu		
1986	Simhasanam	Rajguru	
1986	Nireekshana	Jailer	
1986	Magadheerudu		
1986	Naa Pilupe Prabhanjanam	Kodandaramaiah	
1986	Adavi Raja	Punyakoti	
1986	Dharmapeetam Daddarillindhi	Kabuli Bhai	
1986	Khaidi Rudrayya	Phanibhushan Rao's elder son	
1986	Ravana Brahma	Sivaram	
1986	Oka Radha Iddaru Krishnulu		
1986	Vijrumbhana	Puligadda Narasimham	
1986	Jayam Manade	Subbaiah	
1986	Santhi Nivasam		
1986	Chanakya Sapadham	Major Nagarjuna	
1987	Chakravarthy	Bhadrachalam	
1987	Thene Manasulu	Satyam	
1987	Ajeyudu		
1987	Jebu Donga	CBI Director Gajapathi	
1987	Donga Garu Swagatham	Mushti Subrahmanyam	
1987	Trimurtulu		
1987	Daada		
1987	Thandri Kodukula Challenge	Chakradhara Rao	
1987	Rowdy Police		
1987	Chaitanya Ratham	Vara Prasad	
1987	Sruthilayalu	Naidu	
1987	Bhale Mogudu		
1987	Sardar Krishnama Naidu	Jogeswara Rao	
1987	Maa Voori Magadu	Kaleswara Rao	
1987	Majnu		
1987	Muddu Bidda		
1988	Manchi Donga		
1988	Yamudiki Mogudu	Yamadharma raju	
1988	Dorakani Donga	School Master	
1988	Khaidi No. 786		
1988	Nyayam Kosam	S.P. Varma	
1988	Donga Kollu		
1988	Premayanam		
1988	Chikkadu Dorakadu		
1988	Maharajasri Mayagadu		
1988	Rudraveena		
1988	Jamadagni		
1988	Aakhari Poratam		
1988	Trinetrudu		
1988	Kaliyuga Karnudu	Ramakrishna	
1988	Ugranethrudu	Ankineedu	
1989	Athaku Yamudu Ammayiki Mogudu		
1989	Atha Mechina Alludu	Rayudu	
1989	State Rowdy	Kamendra Bhupathi	
1989	Paape Maa Pranam	Father Joseph Sebastian	
1989	Soggadi Kaapuram	Jagannatham	
1989	Lankeswarudu		
1989	Bhooporatam		
1989	Sarvabhoumudu	Kotilingam	
1989	Bandhuvulostunnaru Jagratha	Subba Rao	
1989	Dhruva Nakshatram	Lakshmipati	
1989	Ontari Poratam		
1989	Suthradharulu	Nilakanthaiah	
1989	Dorikithe Dongalu	Lawyer Chakravarthy	
1989	Jayammu Nischayammu Raa!		
1989	Palnati Rudraiah	Prajapati	
1990	Mamasri	Gorrela Gopala Rao	
1990	Prananiki Pranam	Nagaraju aka Nagu Dada	
1990	Mahajananiki Maradalu Pilla		
1990	Rowdyism Nasinchali		
1990	Kondaveeti Donga		
1990	Padmavathi Kalyanam		
1990	Dagudumuthula Dampathyam		
1990	Aggi Ramudu		
1990	Kodama Simham		
1990	Raja Vikramarka		
1990	Nari Nari Naduma Murari	Veera Badhraiah	
1990	Nagastram		
1990	Aayudham	Peda Venkatrayudu	
1990	Inspector Rudra	Dushasana Rao	
1990	Alludugaru	Jailer	
1991	Stuartpuram Police Station		
1991	Amma Rajinama	Father	
1991	Jagannatakam		
1991	Srivari Chindulu		
1991	Assembly Rowdy		
1991	Ramudu Kadhu Rakshasudu		
1991	Agni Nakshatram		
1991	Shanti Kranti		
1991	Gang Leader	Jailer	
1991	Rowdy Alludu		
1991	Talli Tandrulu		
1991	Surya IPS		
1992	Aapadbandhavudu	President of the village	
1992	Gharana Mogudu	Ranganayakulu	
1992	Adrustham		
1992	Samrat Ashoka		
1992	Allari Mogudu		
1992	Raktha Tharpanam		
1992	Allari Pilla		
1992	College Bullodu		
1992	Sriman Brahmachari		
1992	Brundavanam		
1992	Seetharatnam Gari Abbayi		
1992	Bhale Khideelu		
1992	Detective Naarada		
1992	President Gari Pellam		
1993	Repati Rowdy		
1993	Srinatha Kavi Sarvabhoumudu		
1993	Amma Koduku		
1993	Kalachakram		
1993	Evandi Aavida Vachindi		
1993	Asale Pellaina Vaani		
1993	Manavarali Pelli	Veerayya Dora	
1993	Sabash Ramu		
1993	Attaku Koduku Mamaku Alludu		
1993	Konguchatu Krishnudu		
1993	Radha Saradhi		
1993	Donga Alludu		
1993	Mechanic Alludu	Narayana	
1993	Alibaba Aradajanu Dongalu		
1993	Kunti Putrudu		
1994	Mugguru Monagallu		
1994	Samaram		
1994	Yamaleela	Yamadharmaraju	
1994	Allari Premikudu		
1994	Rickshaw Rudraiah		
1994	Brahmachari Mogudu	Madhavayya	
1994	Doragariki Donga Pellam		
1994	Namaste Anna		
1994	Atha Kodallu		
1994	Bobbili Simham		
1994	Srivari Priyuralu		
1994	Muddula Priyudu		
1994	Bhale Pellam		
1994	Lucky Chance		
1994	Bhairava Dweepam		
1994	Hello Alludu		
1994	Bangaru Kutumbam		
1994	M. Dharmaraju M.A.		
1994	Criminal		
1995	Pokiri Raja		
1995	Subhamasthu		
1995	Raja Simham		
1995	Aalu Magalu		
1995	Bharatha Simham		
1995	Adavi Dora		
1995	Sankalpam		
1995	Ghatothkachudu	Ghatothkachudu	
1995	Rambantu	Raja Ramachandra Prasad	
1995	Super Mogudu	Gomukham	
1995	Pedarayudu		
1996	Vamsanikokkadu		
1996	Nayudu Gari Kutumbam	Bhaktavatsalam	
1996	Pellala Rajyam		
1996	Ooha		
1996	Pelli Sandadi		
1996	Rayudugaru Nayudugaru		
1996	Sahasa Veerudu Sagara Kanya	Bangaru Raju	
1996	Maa Inti Aadapaduchu		
1996	College Student		
1996	Pittala Dora		
1996	Soggadi Pellam	Raghavaiah	
1996	Ramudochadu		
1997	Pelli Sandadi		
1997	Nenu Premisthunnanu		
1997	Aahwanam		
1997	Subhakankshalu		
1997	Chinnabbayi		
1997	Evandi Pelli Chesukondi		
1997	Ugadi		
1997	Super Heroes		
1997	Muddula Mogudu		
1997	Abbai Gari Pelli		
1997	Bobbili Dora		
1997	Oka Chinna Maata		
1997	Kaliyugamlo Gandaragolam		
1997	Devudu	Rayudu	
1998	Suryavamsam		
1998	Kante Koothurne Kanu		
1998	Eshwar Alla		
1998	Subhakankshalu	Seetharamaiah	
1998	Bavagaru Bagunnara?		
1999	Samarasimha Reddy		
1999	Raja		
1999	Maa Balaji	Balwinder Singh	
1999	Bobbili Vamsam		
1999	Ayanagaru		
2000	Goppinti Alludu		
2001	Murari	Satti Pandu	
2001	Ninnu Choodalani		
2001	Eduruleni Manishi		
2001	Darling Darling	Hema's uncle	
2002	Nee Premakai		
2002	Idiot	DGP	
2002	Kalusukovalani	GF	
2003	Fools	Adabala Veera Narasimha Naidu	
2003	Appudappudu		
2003	Palnati Brahmanayudu		
2003	Janaki Weds Sriram		
2003	Neeke Manasichaanu	Raghavaiah	
2004	Cheppave Chirugali	Hotel manager	
2004	Aaptudu	Sivaramakrishnayya	
2005	Narasimhudu		
2005	Andarivaadu	Govinda's paternal uncle	
2005	Kanchanamala Cable TV		
2006	Chilipi Krishnudu		
2007	Yamagola Malli Modalayindi	Pedda Yamudu	
2007	Shridi		
2008	Vijay IPS		
2009	Arundhati	Bhupathi Raja	
2011	Anaganaga O Dheerudu		
2012	Daruvu	Yamadharmaraja	
2013	Jagadguru Adi Shankara		
2019	N.T.R. Kathanayakudu	H. M. Reddy	
2019	Maharshi	Pooja's paternal grandfather	
2023	Deerghaayushmanbhava	Yamadharmaraju	
2024	Saripodhaa Sanivaaram	Koormanand and Dayanand's late father (photo presence)	

==== Tamil films ====
List of film acting credits
Year	Title	Role
1980	Kaali	Rajaram
1980	Soundaryame Varuga Varuga	
2002	Panchatanthiram	Reddy
2007	Periyar	Venkatappa Nayakar

==== Other language films ====
List of film acting credits
Year	Title	Role	Language
1962	Swarna Gowri	Lord Parameshwara	Kannada
1986	Karma	Kittam Kittu	Hindi

== See also ==
- Raghupathi Venkaiah Award
