= Donga Kollu =

- VCD Cover
- Directed by: Vijaya Bapineedu
- Written by: Kaasi Viswanath (dialogues)
- Screenplay by: Vijaya Bapineedu
- Story by: Vijaya Bapineedu; M.V.V.S. Babu Rao
- Based on: Sanmanassullavarkku Samadhanam (1986)
- Produced by: Gutta Madhusudana Rao
- Starring: Rajendra Prasad; Sumalatha
- Cinematography: N. S. Raju
- Edited by: Trinath
- Music by: Vasu Rao
- Production company: M. R. C. Movie Creations
- Release date: 1988
- Running time: 125 mins
- Country: India
- Language: Telugu

Donga Kollu is a 1988 Telugu-language comedy film directed by Vijaya Bapineedu. It stars Rajendra Prasad and Sumalatha, with music composed by Vasu Rao. It is produced by Gutta Madhusudana Rao under the M. R. C. Movie Creations banner. The film is a remake of Malayalam film Sanmanassullavarkku Samadhanam (1986).

== Cast ==
- Rajendra Prasad as Allipilli Anjaneyulu
- Sumalatha as Neeraja
- Satyanarayana as Bombay Dada
- Nutan Prasad as Inspector Bellam Appa Rao
- Brahmanandam as Veeragandham Appa Rao
- Raavi Kondala Rao as Adovocate Lankela Shankara Rao
- Pradeep Shakthi as Nagaraju
- Dr. Siva Prasad as Drill Master
- Kasi Viswanath as Sontikommu Somaraju
- Vankayala Satyanarayana as Boss
- Misro as Manager
- Chitti Babu as Constable
- Shubha as Tulasamma
- Disco Shanthi as item number
- Pavala Shyamala as Shyamala
- Kalpana Rai as Veeragandham's wife
- Y. Vijaya as Tapoppula Tayaramma
- Master Ravi Kumar

== Soundtrack ==
Donga Kollu

Film score by Vasu Rao
- Released: 1988
- Genre: Soundtrack
- Length: 19:02
- Label: AVM Audio
- Producer: Vasu Rao

The soundtrack was composed by Saluri Vasu Rao and released by AVM Audio.

Tracklist
No.	Title	Lyrics	Singer(s)	Length
1.	"I Love You Jeebra"	Veturi	S. P. Balasubrahmanyam, K. S. Chithra	4:02
2.	"Seethammo Mayammo"	Veturi	Mano	4:44
3.	"Yemani Vivarinchanu"	Bhuvana Chandra	Vani Jayaram	4:52
4.	"Buslo Mussu"	Veturi	S. P. Balasubrahmanyam, P. Susheela	4:19
5.	"Ravoyi Mayintiki"	Bhuvana Chandra	Mano, S. P. Sailaja	5:46
6.	"Yenniyo Bhajanalu"	Babu Rao	Rajendra Prasad, S. P. Sailaja	0:31
Total length:				24:14

== Others ==
- VCDs and DVDs on - SHALIMAR Video Company, Hyderabad
