= Rakta Bandham =

- Theatrical poster
- Directed by: Aluri Ravi
- Written by: Aluri Ravi
- Produced by: S. Vijayalakshmi
- Starring: Chiranjeevi, Nutan Prasad
- Music by: G.K. Venkatesh
- Production company: Ricoh Films
- Release date: 13 December 1980
- Country: India
- Language: Telugu

Rakta Bandham (transl. Blood Relation) is a Telugu film starring Chiranjeevi and Nutan Prasad.

== Cast ==
- Chiranjeevi as Sub inspector of Police Tilak
- Prasad Babu as Ranjan Babu
- Nutan Prasad as Bhagotham
- Suvarna as Sunitha
- Kavita as Chendri
- Sumithra as Bharathi
- Roja Ramani as Malli
- J. V. Ramana Murthi as Dharma Rao
- Pushpalatha as Saradamma
- Thyagaraju
- Jayamalini
- Valluri Venkatramaiah
- Jayasheela

== Crew ==
- Dialogues: Modukuri Johnson
- Lyrics: Dr. C. Narayana Reddy & Jaladi
- Playback Singers: P. Susheela, S. Janaki, S.P. Balasubrahmanyam, G. Anand, S.P. Sailaja, Rajesh, Latha Rani & Vinod
- Dances: Seshu
- Art: Ranga Rao
- Stunts: Selvamani
- Editing: Nayani Maheshwara Rao
- Cinematography: P. Bhaskar Rao
- Music: G.K. Venkatesh
- Producers: S. Vijaya Lakshmi & P.S. Krishna
- Story, Screenplay & Direction: Aluri Ravi
