= Yavvanam Katesindi =

1976 film by Dasari Narayana Rao

- Poster
- Directed by: Dasari Narayana Rao
- Story by: Panchu Arunachalam
- Based on: Mayangukiral Oru Maadhu by S. P. Muthuraman
- Produced by: Maganti Ravindranath Chowdary; Vijaya Bapineedu (Presenter)
- Starring: Krishnam Raju; Jayachitra; Murali Mohan
- Music by: Chakravarthy
- Release date: 23 January 1976
- Running time: 127 minutes
- Country: India
- Language: Telugu

Yavvanam Katesindi is a 1976 Telugu-language drama film directed by Dasari Narayana Rao and produced by Vijaya Bapineedu. The film stars Krishnam Raju, Jayachitra and Murali Mohan. The music was composed by Chakravarthy. It is a remake of 1975 Tamil film Mayangukiral Oru Maadhu. It was a super hit at the box office.

== Cast ==
- Krishnam Raju
- Jayachitra
- Murali Mohan
- Gummadi

== Production ==
After Vijaya Bapineedu acquired the rights to remake the 1975 Tamil film Mayangukiral Oru Maadhu in Telugu, he wanted Chedina Aadadi (transl. Filthy Woman) to be the title of the remake. P. Pullayya, who was a member of Central Board of Film Certification, did not accept the title, so Bapineedu went for Yavvanam Katesindi.

== Soundtrack ==
The music was composed by Chakravarthy.

No.	Title	Lyrics	Performer(s)	Length
1.	"Ala Ala Navvali"	Daasarathi	S. P. Balasubrahmanyam, Jayasri
2.	"Yerugani Sukhame Edhuruga Nilichindhi"	Veturi	P. Susheela
3.	"Samsaram Oka Chakkani Veena"	Utpala Satyanarayana Charya	S. P. Balasubrahmanyam
4.	"Atu Kaalanagu Itu Vetakadu"	Utpala Satyanarayana Charya	Vani Jairam

== Release and reception ==
Yavvanam Katesindi was released on 23 January 1976, and emerged a success.
