= Magadheerudu =

1986 film by Vijaya Bapineedu

- Theatrical poster
- Directed by: Vijaya Bapineedu
- Produced by: Maganti Ravindranath Chowdary
- Starring: Chiranjeevi; Jayasudha; Chandra Mohan; Rao Gopal Rao
- Music by: S. P. Balasubrahmanyam
- Release date: 7 March 1986
- Country: India
- Language: Telugu

Magadheerudu is a 1986 Telugu film directed by Vijaya Bapineedu. The film stars Chiranjeevi, Jayasudha, Chandra Mohan and Rao Gopal Rao in important roles.

== Plot ==
Chiru is the youngest son in Satyanarayana's family, who falls in love with a middle-class girl and marries her even though his brothers and sisters-in-law do not approve. The jealous sisters-in-law try to create problems for the new bride in the house with the help of Rao Gopal Rao, who is sitting there to take away their property. Sathyanarayana dies of a heart attack when he discovers this and the brothers fight over the wealth.

Chiru and Jayasudha leave the house empty-handed and try to stick together, but Chiru is jailed and Jayasudha is left alone. The family is traumatised by their separation and the rest of the plot is about how Chiru reunites his family after leaving jail and losing his son.

== Cast ==
- Chiranjeevi
- Jayasudha
- Chandramohan
- Satyanarayana
- Allu Ramalingaiah
- Rao Gopal Rao
- Nutan Prasad
- Chandra Mohan
- Narasimha Raju
- J. V. Somayajulu
- Rajanala
- Rallapalli
- Aruna Kumar
- Rajasekhar Reddy
- Ali
- Subha
- Roja Ramani
- K. Vijaya
- Y. Vijaya

== Soundtrack ==
The music and background score for the film was composed by S. P. Balasubrahmanyam.

- "Atu Dahanam" -S. P. Balasubrahmanyam
- "Icchotane" -S. P. Balasubrahmanyam
- "Intiperu Anuragam" -S. P. Balasubrahmanyam
- "Jatha Kalise Iddharam" -S. P. Balasubrahmanyam
- "Mana Jeevithaalu" -S. P. Balasubrahmanyam
