= Maa Inti Premayanam =

- Theatrical release poster
- Directed by: Alluri Ravi
- Starring: Chandra Mohan; Sulakshana; Prasad Babu; Ramaprabha; Sharat Babu; Nutan Prasad
- Cinematography: V. S. R. Krishna Rao
- Music by: J. V. Raghavulu
- Release date: 11 August 1983
- Country: India
- Language: Telugu

Maa Inti Premayanam is a 1983 Telugu film directed by Alluri Ravi. The film stars Chandra Mohan, Prasad Babu, Ramaprabha and Sharat Babu in important roles. Chiranjeevi does a cameo appearance towards the end of the film.

== Plot ==
Anand (Chandra Mohan) lives and works at his aunt (Ramaprabha)'s place and he falls in love with Akila (Sulakshana), who came from a small village in order to search for work. Akila works in same office and her goal is to get her sister's eyes treated. She is being harassed by her relative, who once lent her money and wants to marry her in return. Ramaprabha's friend comes to her place with her daughter Sony (Jyothi) to get her married to Ramaprabha's nephew (Sharat Babu) in the United States. Prasad Babu, who is a friend of Chandramohan, runs a printing press and falls in love with Jyothi and enters their house as Ranadheer from USA. Both fall in love, but Prasad Babu's reality is disclosed and he is arrested. Nutan Prasad too, develops a soft corner for Ramaprabha, but since he works as cook in her home, he doesn't dare express it in front of her. Ranadheer (Sharat Babu) returns from the United States and explains to his aunt that he is already married. Confusion leads to chaos and Chiranjeevi enters in the climax to wrap up everything right with a song and fight, leading to a happy end.

== Cast ==
- Chandra Mohan
- Sulakshana
- Prasad Babu
- Ramaprabha
- Sharat Babu
- Nutan Prasad
- Chiranjeevi(Guest Role)
