= Hero (1984 film) =

1984 Tollywood film directed by Vijaya Bapineedu

- Theatrical release poster
- Directed by: Vijaya Bapineedu
- Produced by: Allu Aravind
- Starring: Chiranjeevi; Radhika
- Music by: Krishna—Chakra
- Production company: Geetha Arts
- Release date: 23 March 1984
- Running time: 129 minutes
- Country: India
- Language: Telugu

Hero is a 1984 Indian Telugu-language film directed by Vijaya Bapineedu and produced by Allu Aravind. This film starred Chiranjeevi, Radhika, and Rao Gopal Rao in important roles.

== Plot ==
Chiranjeevi plays an archeologist Krishna, who comes to a village in search of a plan for the hidden treasure. His friend Vikram was killed in the same village trying for that plan. One day during his work, he saves Kanakaraju and three other villagers from dying. They become his friend and also treat him as their philosopher and guide. Meanwhile, Radhika, a village belle, falls for him and forces him to marry her. When Krisha refuses, she successfully enters the role of a rape victim in front of the villagers. Krishna later learns that Kanakraju was in fact Kondababu, who killed Vikram, who was searching a plan for the hidden treasure. How Krishna plans and exposes Kanakaraju's reality forms the rest of the story.

== Cast ==
- Chiranjeevi as Krishna, an archeologist
- Radhika
- Rao Gopal Rao
- Kaikala Satyanarayana
- Allu Ramalingaiah
- Nirmalamma
- Prasad Babu
- Allu Aravind
- Jyothi Lakshmi as an item number
- Jayamalini as an item number
- Silk Smitha as an item number

== Production ==
The film is one of the various collaborations of Vijaya Bapineedu with Chiranjeevi. It drew inspiration from the 1981 Hollywood film Raiders of the Lost Ark with the opening scene being an exact replica of the latter.

== Soundtrack ==
- "Yettetta" - S. Janaki, S. P. Balasubrahmanyam, S. P. Sailaja
- "Ramalkashmanulu" - S. P. Balasubrahmanyam, P. Susheela
- "Kasi Looputtanu" - P. Susheela, S. P. Balasubrahmanyam
- "Devathalara" - S. Janaki, S. P. Balasubrahmanyam
- "Monnarathri" - S. Janaki
- "Ramalkashmanulu" 1 - S. P. Balasubrahmanyam, P. Susheela
