= Mondi Ghatam =

- Theatrical release poster
- Directed by: Raja Chandra
- Produced by: Daggubati Bhaskara Rao
- Starring: Chiranjeevi; Radhika; Satyanarayana; Annapoorna; Gummadi
- Cinematography: P. Chengaiah
- Edited by: K. A. Marthand
- Music by: Satyam
- Release date: 6 November 1982
- Country: India
- Language: Telugu

Mondi Ghatam is a Telugu-language film which was released on 6 November 1982. It was directed by Raja Chandra. The film stars Chiranjeevi, Radhika, Kaikala Satyanarayana and Gummadi.

== Plot ==
Chiranjeevi plays an angry young man Ravindra, who is stubborn and adamant about what he feels is right. He is the only son of his parents Satyanarayana, who is a Judge and Annapurna and is loved by Lata (Radhika). Ravindra's friend Eeshwar works for Prasad Babu, who kicks him out of the job without paying him. Ravindra demands justice and bashes up Prasad Babu and ends up in court in front of his father as a culprit. Lata's father advises him to lie in court, but he sticks to truth and is jailed for a few days. Satyanarayana feels insulted and warns Ravindra to control himself. Prasad Babu plans to take revenge for dragging him to court and plans an accident for Eeshwar. Eeshwar loses his legs and when Ravindra tries to lodge a complaint, police say that Prasad Babu's car was stolen 3 hours back. The case is lost and Ravindra gets frustrated. Prasad Babu also forces Lata's father (Raavi Kondalarao) to force and engagement of his daughter with him. Meanwhile, Eeshwar's wife Susheela steps into prostitution to earn money and unable to bear this, Eeshwar commits suicide. Ravindra takes up the responsibility of Eeshwar's sister Padma. Prasad Babu, who is still seeking revenge, gets the fingerprints of Ravindra and gets special gloves made with those prints and uses them to rape Padma and kills her. The blame falls on Ravindra and he is arrested. Prasad Babu's father Gummadi reveals the secret of the gloves to Satyanarayana in a drunken state. Satyanarayana resigns his judge post and fights this case for his son as a lawyer, but fails to prove anything about those gloves. Ravindra decides that only violence can solve this case and attacks Prasad Babu's place and gets every clue needed. The real culprits are punished and the movie ends with Ravindra's marriage with Latha.

== Soundtrack ==
No.	Title	Length
1.	"Ne Mondi Ghatanni"
2.	"Okatirendu"
3.	"Bhale Bhale Bullodu"
4.	"Khayam Khayam"
