= Parvathi Parameswarulu =

- Theatrical release poster
- Directed by: M. S. Kota Reddy
- Written by: S. Rani Rao & S. Lakshmi
- Produced by: S. Venkataratnam
- Starring: Chandra Mohan; Chiranjeevi
- Edited by: A. Sanjeevi
- Music by: Satyam
- Production company: Pallavi Pictures
- Release date: February 6, 1981
- Running time: 130 minutes
- Country: India
- Language: Telugu

Parvathi Parameswarulu is a 1981 Telugu-language film starring Chiranjeevi.

== Cast ==
- Chandra Mohan as Murali
- Chiranjeevi as Mohan
- Prabha as Sunitha
- Swapna as Geeta
- Kaikala Satyanarayana as Paramesam
- Allu Rama Lingaiah as Narada
- Sowcar Janaki as Parvathi
- Hema Sundar
- Athili Lakshmi
- Jayamalini
- Halam
- Prabhakar Reddy as guest appearance
- Narasimha Raju as guest appearance
- Telephone Satyanarayana
- P.R. Anand
- Ravi Kiran
- D. Kameswara Rao
- Narasimha Rao

== Production Companies ==
- Production Company: Pallavi Pictures
- Studios: Prasad, AVM Studios & Karpagam
- Recording & Re-recording: Gemini Studios
- Outdoor Unit: Sarada Enterprises * Pallavi Cine Services
- Processing & Printing: Prasad Color Laboratories
- Sound Processing: R.K. Laboratories

== Songs ==
All songs were composed by Satyam and written by Veturi.

Song	Playback Singers	Length
"Bharata Mata Putrulam"	S.P. Balasubrahmanyam	3:52
"Nada Nilayude Sivudu"	S. Janaki	6:22
"Toli Mojulo Chali Rojulo"	S.P. Balasubrahmanyam & S. Janaki	4:02
"Sada Sudha Maya"	S. Janaki	3:55
"Thaluku Choosina Nee Beluku Choosina"	S.P. Balasubrahmanyam, S. Janaki & Ramola	3:34
