= Gang Leader =

- Theatrical release poster
- Directed by: Vijaya Bapineedu
- Written by: Vijaya Bapineedu; Paruchuri Brothers (Dialogues)
- Produced by: Maganti Ravindranath Chowdary
- Starring: Chiranjeevi; Vijayashanti
- Cinematography: Lok Singh
- Edited by: Vijaya Bapineedu
- Music by: Bappi Lahari
- Production company: Shyam Prasad Arts
- Distributed by: Geetha Arts
- Release date: 9 May 1991
- Running time: 155 minutes
- Country: India
- Language: Telugu
- Box office: ₹10 crore

Gang Leader is a 1991 Indian Telugu-language action crime film written and directed by Vijaya Bapineedu, and produced by Maganti Ravindranath Chowdary. The film stars Chiranjeevi and Vijayashanti, while Rao Gopal Rao, Anandaraj, Murali Mohan, and Sarath Kumar play supporting roles. The soundtrack was composed by Bappi Lahiri with dance choreography by Prabhu Deva. The film explores the exploitation of law enforcement by anti-social behaviour and the impact of mob psychology.

The film opened to highly positive reviews from the critics and became the highest grossing Telugu film at the time. It was screened at the International Film Festival of India. Later, it was dubbed in Tamil with the same title. The film was later remade in Hindi as Aaj Ka Goonda Raaj (1992) where Chiranjeevi reprises his role and in Kannada as Kutumba (2003).

== Plot ==
Raghupathi, Raghava, and Rajaram are three brothers living in a joint household. Raghupathi serves as the sole earning member, Raghava diligently prepares for the Civil Services Examination, and Rajaram is an unemployed, free-spirited dancer who spends his days roaming the city with his four friends in search of work. Rajaram's late-night routines and indolent lifestyle draw sharp reprimands from his grandmother, Sabari.

One day, Rajaram assists a landlord in evicting Kanyakumari for non-payment of rent. In retaliation, Kanyakumari forcibly moves into Rajaram's residence, creating initial friction that eventually turns into a domestic arrangement. Later, to secure necessary funds for Raghava’s IAS preparation, Rajaram deliberately accepts money to go to jail in place of a culprit.

Meanwhile, Ekambaram, a notorious syndicate boss specialising in contract killings, and his brother Kanakambaram murder Raghupathi after he witnesses one of their homicides. While Rajaram remains incarcerated, his friends learn of the murder but keep it from him, leading Rajaram to believe his brother died in a routine accident. Raghava subsequently qualifies as an IAS officer and marries Latha, a union secretly orchestrated by Ekambaram and Kanakambaram to exploit Raghava's administrative position to evade prosecution. While Latha expresses disdain towards Raghava's family, Kanyakumari grows deeply attached to them. Shortly after Rajaram uncovers the truth behind Raghupathi's murder, Ekambaram and Kanakambaram assassinate Rajaram's four friends and frame Rajaram for the crime.

Disowned by Raghava due to the murder charges, Rajaram is imprisoned but escapes with Kanyakumari's assistance. She reveals that she is Ekambaram's estranged daughter, who fled home after she witnessed him murder her mother. Kanyakumari confesses her love for Rajaram, who accepts her proposal. Gathering evidence against the syndicates, Rajaram returns to his family home, only to find Raghava and the rest of the household held hostage by Ekambaram and Kanakambaram.

Rajaram and Kanyakumari confront the gangsters, overpower their forces, and kill Ekambaram and Kanakambaram. With the threat eliminated and Rajaram's name cleared, the family reunites.

== Cast ==
- Chiranjeevi as Rajaram
- Vijayashanti as Kanyakumari
- Rao Gopal Rao as Ekambaram
- Anandaraj as Kanakambaram
- Murali Mohan as Raghupati
- Sarath Kumar as Raghava
- Nirmalamma as Sabari (Rajaram's grandmother)
- Sudha as Lakshmi (Raghupati's wife)
- Sumalatha as Latha (Raghava's wife)
- Vallabhaneni Janardhan as Latha's father
- Nutan Prasad as Home Minister Gali Subba Rao
- Kaikala Satyanarayana as Jailer
- Allu Ramalingaiah as Sidhanthi
- G. V. Narayana Rao as Narayana
- Hari Prasad as Hari
- Maharshi Raghava as Raghava
- Prasad Babu as Ekambaram's henchman
- Jayalalitha as Chukka
- Nuthalapati Subbaro as House Owner

== Production ==
After previous collaborations such as Maga Maharaju, Hero and Magadheerudu, Bapineedu decided to make a different kind of film with Chiranjeevi and narrated a plot to which he rejected. Bapineedu later narrated this story to Paruchuri Gopalakrishna (of Paruchuri Brothers) who found some flaws and made some changes in the script. Chiranjeevi agreed to the story as he had faith in Paruchuri Brothers. Allu Aravind who was initially sceptical of the film's plot point of Chiranjeevi's friends dying at the same time and expressed his concerns to Gopalakrishna to which he agreed and rewrote that aspect.

The Paruchuri brothers wrote the storyline of the film which was initially titled Are O Samba. Are O Samba is one of the famous dialogues from the film Sholay as well. But the title was changed to Gang Leader at the insistence of director Vijaya Bapineedu. The director came up with this title after he saw the same being used by writer G Satya Murthy for a serial. Bapineedu loved the title and he convinced Chiranjeevi to rename the film from Are O Samba to Gang Leader.

== Soundtrack ==
Gang Leader

Soundtrack album by Bappi Lahiri
- Released: 1991
- Recorded: 1991
- Genre: Feature film soundtrack
- Language: Telugu
- Label: Lahari Music

Bappi Lahiri chronology
Indra Bhavanam (1992)	Gang Leader (1991)	Rowdy Alludu (1991)

The music was provided by Bappi Lahiri and the lyrics were penned by Veturi and Bhuvanachandra. The soundtrack was an instant hit and "Papa Rita" and "Vaana Vaana Velluvaye" were a rage in the entire state at that time. The song "Paala Bugga" is loosely based on Bappi's own song "Tutak Tutak Tutiya" from Ghar Ka Chiraag.

Bhuvanachandra noted that "Vaana Vaana" was his first song on rain, he was initially apprehensive about writing this song since other songs of the same nature were popular. Bappi composed the tune at Suresh Guest House, initially, the tune was rejected however Bhuvan insisted that the tune should be retained. Later, the song "Vaana Vaana Velluvaye" was re-mixed by Mani Sharma for the 2012 film Rachcha.

=== Telugu version ===
Lyrics written by Veturi and Bhuvanachandra.

Track Listing
No.	Title	Lyrics	Singer(s)	Length
1.	"Papa Rita"	Bhuvana Chandra	S. P. Balasubrahmanyam
2.	"Paala Bugga"	Veturi	S. P. Balasubrahmanyam, K. S. Chithra
3.	"Bhadrachalam"	Bhuvana Chandra	S. P. Balasubrahmanyam, K. S. Chithra
4.	"Vaana Vaana Velluvaye"	Bhuvana Chandra	S. P. Balasubrahmanyam, K. S. Chithra
5.	"Vayasu Vayasu"	Veturi	S. P. Balasubrahmanyam, K. S. Chithra
6.	"Panisaasasa"	Bhuvana Chandra	S. P. Balasubrahmanyam, K. S. Chithra

=== Tamil version ===
Lyrics written by Vairamuthu.

Track listing
No.	Title	Singer(s)	Length
1.	"Paapa Rita Mutham Ketta"	S. P. Balasubramaniam	4:48
2.	"Pattupoove Thottu Paaru"	S. P. B., Chithra	4:38
3.	"Vaadai Vaadai Mazhaiyin"	S. P. B., Chithra	4:37
4.	"Pallavaram Selai"	S. P. B.	5:20
5.	"Sunday Kannadithaay"	S. P. B., Chithra	5:36

== Release and reception ==
Sold for ₹2.2 crore (US$240,000), the film grossed more than twice that amount. Gang Leader had a 162-day run at Sudharshan theatre in Hyderabad. The film successfully completed 100 days in more than 50 theatres, with festivities arranged simultaneously in four centres—Tirupati, Vijayawada, Eluru, and Hyderabad. Chiranjeevi and some crew members flew in a helicopter to attend all the celebrations, marking the first time such an event had been organized.

Gang Leader was dubbed into Tamil with the same title. It was a success in those areas also. The film was re-released in 4K quality on 4 March 2023.

== Legacy ==
Video footage of the film's 100 days celebration was used in the Telugu comedy film Appula Appa Rao (1992).
