= Intiguttu (1984 film) =

- Theatrical release poster
- Directed by: K.Bapayya
- Written by: Paruchuri Brothers
- Based on: Panakkara Kudumbam (1964)
- Produced by: D.V.S.Raju
- Starring: Chiranjeevi; Nalini; Suhasini; Satyanarayana; Allu Ramalingaiah; Chandra Mohan
- Cinematography: Venkat
- Edited by: Kotagiri Venkateswarao
- Music by: Chakravarthy
- Release date: 14 September 1984
- Country: India
- Language: Telugu

Intiguttu (transl. Family Secret) is a 1984 Indian Telugu-language film that was directed by K. Bapayya. It stars Chiranjeevi, Nalini, Suhasini, and Kaikala Satyanarayana. The movie is a remake of the 1964 Tamil movie Panakkara Kudumbam. Despite being a remake of a Tamil film, the film was dubbed in Tamil as Dhairiyasali.

== Cast ==
- Chiranjeevi
- Nalini
- Suhasini
- Chandramohan
- Rao Gopala Rao
- Giri Babu
- Nutan Prasad
- Satyanarayana
- Allu Ramalingaiah
- Sarathi
- Chalapathi Rao

== Soundtrack ==
- Chedugudu
- Lepave Lepave
- Letha Letha Cheekati
- Navvithe Navvandi
- Randi Podamu
- Veriety Veriety
