= Khaidi No. 786 =

- Theatrical release poster
- Directed by: Vijaya Bapineedu
- Produced by: Maganti Ravindranath Chowdary
- Starring: Chiranjeevi; Bhanupriya; Mohan Babu; Suthi Velu; Nutan Prasad
- Cinematography: Lok Singh
- Edited by: Kalyan Varma; Trinadha Rao
- Music by: Raj–Koti
- Production company: Shyam Prasad Arts
- Distributed by: Geetha Arts
- Release date: 10 June 1988
- Country: India
- Language: Telugu

Khaidi No. 786 (transl. Prisoner No. 786) is a 1988 Indian Telugu-language film directed by Vijaya Bapineedu. It stars Chiranjeevi, Bhanupriya, Suthivelu, Kota Srinivasa Rao, Mohan Babu, Nutan Prasad and Kaikala Satyanarayana. It is the second film in Chiranjeevi's successful Khaidi trilogy. The film is a remake of the 1986 Tamil film Amman Kovil Kizhakale, and was released on 10 June 1988.

== Plot ==
Gopi (Chiranjeevi) is a music master brought up by Satyanarayana and Nutan Prasad in a village. He wants to become a police constable. Surya Chandra Rao (Kota Srinivasa Rao) is a rich man in the village with his daughter Radha (Bhanupriya), who is headstrong and proud of her riches. In a brawl with Gopi, she seeks revenge and acts as his disciple wanting to learn music and later accuses him of attempting to rape her with the help of the new SI of the village, Asirayya (Mohan Babu), but later realises her mistake and his good nature and falls in love with him. Though reluctant to marry her, Gopi is convinced to accept her into his life and they marry. Surya Chandra Rao is enraged by this and sends a goon to kill him and in the fight, the goon loses and Gopi leaves him at Surya Chandra Rao's house, warning him not to enter his life again. The goon is killed by Surya Chandra Rao and Gopi is accused of his murder and is put in jail. The rest of the story is formed on how Gopi proves his innocence and how he brings the villains to justice.

== Cast ==
- Chiranjeevi as Gopichand
- Bhanupriya as Radha
- Mohan Babu as SI Asirayya
- Kota Srinivasa Rao as Surya Chandra Rao
- Kaikala Satyanarayana
- Nutan Prasad
- Silk Smitha as Item number "Atu Amalapuram".
- Padmanabham
- P. J. Sarma
- Prasad Babu as Jailor Durga Rao
- Allu Ramalingaiah
- Manik Irani as Puliraju
- Nirmalamma
- Usilai Mani
- Master Suresh

== Production ==
Khaidi No. 786 was dedicated to actor-filmmaker Raj Kapoor who died a week before the film's release.

== Soundtrack ==
The soundtrack was composed by Raj–Koti and released by Aditya Music. The song "Guvva Gorinkato" was remixed in Sai Dharam Tej's Subramanyam for Sale (2015). The song "Atu Amalapuram" was remixed in Allu Sirish's Kotha Janta (2014).

Track list
No.	Title	Lyrics	Singer(s)	Length
1.	"Guvva Gorinka Tho"	Bhuvana Chandra	S. P. Balasubrahmanyam, S. Janaki	4:30
2.	"Righto Atto Ito"	Veturi	S. P. Balasubrahmanyam, S. Janaki	4:40
3.	"Atu Amalapuram"	Bhuvana Chandra	S. Janaki	4:38
4.	"Chali Gali Kottindamma"	Veturi	S. P. Balasubrahmanyam, S. Janaki	4:44
5.	"Gunddamma Bhandi Digi"	Bhuvana Chandra	S. P. Balasubrahmanyam	4:11
Total length:				22:43

== See also ==
This is the second installment of the Khaidi franchise, the first being Khaidi. released in 1983, the third and last, being Khaidi No. 150.
