= Nirmalamma =

Indian actress

- Born: 18 July 1920; Machilipatnam, Madras Presidency, British India
- Died: 19 February 2009 (aged 88); Hyderabad, India
- Occupations: Actress; producer
- Years active: 1936–2002

Nirmalamma (18 July 1920 – 19 February 2009) was an Indian actress who worked in the Telugu cinema. She appeared in more than 1,000 films and was well known for her grandmother roles in several films. She won two Nandi Awards.

== Early life ==
She was born in Machilipatnam, Madras Presidency, British India.

== Film career ==
Her debut film was Garuda Garvabhangam in 1943. Nirmalamma worked with almost all famous artists in Telugu cinema like NTR, ANR, Krishna, S. V. Ranga Rao, Rajendra Prasad, P. B. Srinivas, Chiranjeevi, Nandamuri Balakrishna, Venkatesh, Nagarjuna and many more. She is one of the artists who appears in almost all of the movies of S. V. Krishna Reddy and E. V. V. Satyanarayana. In a career spanning over five decades, she worked in over 700 films and bagged Nandi award for best supporting actress for her role in ‘Mayuri’. Her roles in films like ‘Sankarabharanam’, ‘Yamagola’, ‘Padaharella Vayasu’, ‘Swathi Muthyam’, ‘Maavi Chiguru’ and ‘Subha Sankalpam’ remain unforgettable. She has had memorable roles in the films Chinnodu Peddodu, Padaharella Vayasu, Kanakamahalakshmi Recording Dance Troupe, Gang Leader, Mayalodu, Egirey Paavurama, Rendilla Poojari, Devatha (Shoban babu's movie), Chinnarayudu, Dalapathi, Alibaba Aradajanu Dongalu, Sitharatnam Gaari Abbayi, Mamagaaru, Aa Okkati Adakku, Karthavyam, Chalaki Mogudu and Chadastapu Pellam.

She has established Nirmala Arts and produced Chalaki Mogudu Chadasthapu Pellam, starring Rajendra Prasad, directed by Relangi Narasimha Rao.

Her last movie was Premaku Swagatham, directed by S. V. Krishna Reddy. Her last public appearance was at the Vajrothsava celebrations of Telugu cinema where many celebrities remembered her for the fact that she has played as mother/grandmother for many generations of Telugu cinema.

== Personal life ==
She had no children of her own, but adopted a daughter, Kavitha.

== Awards ==
Nandi Awards

- 1984 Best Supporting Actress - Mayuri
- 1999 Best Character Actress - Seetharama Raju

== Selected filmography ==
This is partial list of her films.

=== 1950s and before ===
- Garuda Garvabhangam (1936)
- Paduka Pattabhishekam (1957)
- BhagyaDevatha (1959)

=== 1960s ===
- Krishna Prema (1960) - Rukmini
- Bharya Bharthalu (1961)
- Kula Gothralu (1962)
- Devatha (1964)
- Potti Pleader (1966)
- Sri Krishna Tulabharam (1966) Devaki
- Pedarasi Peddamma Katha (1968)
- Deva kanya (1968)
- Sri Rama Katha (1969) - Sumitra
- Ekaveera (1969)

=== 1970s ===
- Thirumalai Thenkumari (1970)
- Vidhi Vilasam (1970) as Krishna's mother
- Naa Tammudu (1971)
- Atthalu Kodallu (1971) as Bangaramma
- Manchi Vallaki Manchivadu (1973)
- Devudu Chesina Manushulu (1973)
- Devudamma (1973)
- Nindu Kutumbam (1973)
- Samsara Saagaram (1973)
- Meena (1973) as Kamala
- Jeevana Jyothi (1975)
- Siri Siri Muvva (1976)
- Padi Pantalu (1976) as Guravayya's mother
- Yamagola (1977)
- Chillarakottu Chittamma (1977)
- Vayasu Pilichindi (1978)
- Padaharella Vayasu (1978) as Gangamma
- Love Marriage (1978) as Parvathi
- Sivaranjani (1978)
- Kothala Raayudu (1979) as Parvati, Satyam's mother
- Sankarabharanam (1979)

=== 1980s ===
- Mosagadu (1980)
- Agni Poolu (1981)
- Amavasya Chandrudu (1981)
- Illantaa Sandadi (1982)
- Patnam Vachina Pativrathalu (1982)
- Kalavari Samsaram (1982)
- Jagannatha Rathachakralu (1982) as Ramu and Krishna's mother
- Kayyala Ammayi Kalavari Abbayi (1982) as Hari's mother
- Subhalekha (1982)
- Kaliyuga Ramudu (1982)
- Chattaniki Veyyi Kallu (1983) as Prathap Kumar & Anandh's mother
- Kirayi Kotigadu (1983) as Parvathamma (Rambabu and Lakshmi's mother)
- Sangharshana (1983)
- Prema Pichollu (1983)
- Kalyana Veena (1983)
- Manthri Gari Viyyankudu (1983) as Annapoornamma
- Maga Maharaju (1983)
- Rajkumar (1983)
- Mugguru Monagallu (1983)
- Rustum (1984)
- Mayuri (1984)
- Mahanagaramlo Mayagadu (1984)
- Jagan (1984)
- Kanchu Kagada (1984) as Janakamma
- Danavudu (1984)
- Anubandham (1984)
- Hero (1984)
- Babai Abbai (1985) as Godaramma
- Kongumudi (1985) as Susheela's grandmother
- Ooriki Soggadu (1985) as Rajamma
- Samsaram O Sangeetam (1985)
- Sravanthi (1985)
- Muchchataga Mugguru (1985)
- Swathi Muthyam (1985)
- Nireekshana (1986)
- Jailu Pakshi (1986)
- Krishna Garadi (1986)
- Oka Radha Iddaru Krishnulu (1986)
- Kondaveeti Raja (1986)
- Aakrandana (1986)
- Naa Pilupe Prabhanjanam (1986) as Manikyamma
- Naaku Pellam Kavali (1987)
- Sri Kanaka Mahalaxmi Recording Dance Troupe (1987) as Padi Sundaramma
- Bharatamlo Arjunudu (1987)
- Viswanatha Nayakudu (1987) as Soudamini, Kalavati's grandmother
- Gundammagari Krishnulu (1987)
- Khaidi No.786 (1988)
- Manchi Donga (1988)
- Mr Hero (1988)
- Aakhari Poratam (1988)
- Maa Inti Maharaju (1988)
- Chinnodu Peddodu (1988)
- Ooregimpu (1988)
- Varasudochhadu (1988)
- Adavilo Ardharathri (1989)
- Siva (1989)
- Vijay (1989)
- Vintha Dongalu (1989) as Vishnumurthy's (Rao Gopal Rao) mother
- Ajatha Satruvu (1989) as Kasulamma
- Sarvabhoumudu (1989) as Janaki, Sarvabhowma's mother
- Chalaki Mogudu Chadastapu Pellam (1989)

=== 1990s ===
- Kondaveeti Donga (1990)
- Mahajananiki Maradalu Pilla (1990)
- Karthavyam (1990) as Mahalakshmi
- Neti Dowrjanyam (1990) as Bharathamma
- Gang Leader (1991)
- Mamagaru (1991)
- People's Encounter (1991)
- Killer (1992) as Subba Lakshmi
- Aapathbandhavudu (1992)
- Srimaan Brahmachari (1992)
- Karuninchina Kanaka Durga (1992)
- Collector Gari Alludu (1992)
- Seethapathi Chalo Tirupathi (1992)
- Raatri (1992)
- Prema Sikharam (1992)
- Sundarakanda (1992)
- Seetharatnam Gari Abbayi (1992)
- Aa Okkati Adakku (1992)
- Chinarayudu (1992)
- Bava Bavamaridi (1993)
- Rakshana (1993)
- Sh... Gup Chup (1993)
- Donga Alludu (1993)
- Mayalodu (1993)
- Matru Devo Bhava (1993)
- Pekata Papa Rao (1993)
- Alibaba Aradajanu Dongalu (1993)
- Allari Premikudu (1994) as Lakshmi Devi
- Raithu Bharatam (1994)
- Chinnabbulu (1995)
- Big Boss (1995)
- Subha Sankalpam (1995) as Lakshmamma
- Soggadi Pellam (1996)
- Sampradayam (1996) as Kumar Raja's grandmother
- Maavichiguru (1996)
- Egire Paavurama (1997)
- Aahvaanam (1997)
- Aaro Pranam (1997)
- Raayudu (1998)
- Life To Wife (1998)
- Pandaga (1998)
- Seetharama Raju (1999)
- Sneham Kosam (1999)

=== 2000s ===
- Kodanda Ramudu (2000)
- Premaku Swagatham (2002)
- Prema Donga (2002)

=== Tamil films ===
- Ilamai Oonjal Aadukirathu (1978)
- Raja Paarvai (1981)
- Thalapathi (1991)
- Kalaignan (1993)
- Oru Oorla Oru Rajakumari (1995)
- Coimbatore Mappillai (1996)

=== Hindi films ===
- Raat (1992)
