= Rao Gopal Rao =

Indian Tollywood actor and politician (1937–1994)

- Born: 14 January 1937; Ganganapalli, Kakinada, Madras Presidency, British India (present-day Andhra Pradesh, India)
- Died: 13 August 1994 (aged 57); Hyderabad, Andhra Pradesh, India (present-day Telangana)
- Occupations: Actor; producer; politician
- Political party: Telugu Desam Party
- Spouse: Kamala Kumari
- Children: 2; including Rao Ramesh

Member of Parliament, Rajya Sabha
- In office 3 April 1986 – 2 April 1992
- Constituency: Andhra Pradesh

Member of Legislative Council, Andhra Pradesh
- In office 1984–1985

Rao Gopal Rao (14 January 1937 – 13 August 1994) was an Indian actor and producer known for his works in Telugu cinema and Telugu theatre. In a film career spanning more than 25 years, Rao starred in over 400 feature films in a variety of characters. He was known for his gruesome portrayals of antagonist roles with a touch of humor. He was presented with Kala Prapoorna in 1990 by Andhra University and was honored with "Natavirat" and "Chittoor Nagayya Award" in 1987.

Rao was known for his villainous roles in works such as Mutyala Muggu (1975), Bhakta Kannappa (1976), Gorantha Deepam (1978), Manavoori Pandavulu (1978), Kaliyuga Ravanasurudu (1980), Tyagayya (1981), Ooruki Monagadu (1981), Gudachari No.1 (1983), Abhilasha (1983), Khaidi (1983), Challenge (1984), Jaakii (1985), Bullet (1985), Athaku Yamudu Ammayiki Mogudu (1989), Lorry Driver (1990), Kondaveeti Donga (1990), and Gang Leader (1991).

== Early life ==
Rao started his career in theatre, with his own company, Associated Amateur Drama Company, and did many plays under the banner. S. V. Ranga Rao saw his plays and recommended him to Gutta Ramineedu, who was making Bhakta Potana (1966). He worked as an assistant director for this film and served as an assistant director in other films, including Bangaru Sankellu and Mooga Prema.

== Politics ==
Rao was appointed to the Andhra Pradesh Legislative Council in 1984–85 and the Parliament of India from Telugu Desam Party. He served as the Member of Rajya Sabha from 3 April 1986 to 2 April 1992.

== Death ==
Rao died on 13 August 1994, aged 57. The film Prema & Co was released after his death.

His son, Rao Ramesh, is a Telugu film actor.

== Filmography ==
| Year | Title | Role | Notes |
|---|---|---|---|
| 1966 | Bhakta Potana | Mamidi Singanamatya | |
| 1968 | Bangaru Sankellu | Film Director | |
| 1969 | Manushulu Marali | | |
| 1969 | Bangaru Panjaram | Doctor | |
| 1969 | Gandara Gandadu | Singanna | |
| 1969 | Jagath Kiladeelu | Bhayankar | |
| 1970 | Pettandarulu | | |
| 1970 | Akhandudu | Bhagyalakshmi Devi's husband | |
| 1971 | Kathanayakuralu | Bhujangam | |
| 1971 | Revolver Rani | Naagu | |
| 1971 | Mosagallaku Mosagadu | | |
| 1971 | Chelleli Kapuram | | |
| 1971 | Mooga Prema | | |
| 1971 | C I D Raju | Dharmayya | |
| 1972 | Kalam Marindi | Koteshu | |
| 1972 | Menakodalu | | |
| 1972 | Nijam Nirupistha | Kotwal Kodandam | |
| 1972 | Bala Bharatam | | |
| 1973 | Desoddharakulu | | |
| 1973 | Ida Lokam | | |
| 1973 | Devudamma | Ramaiah | |
| 1973 | Sneha Bandam | | |
| 1973 | Manchi Vallaki Manchivadu | | |
| 1973 | Sarada | | |
| 1974 | Kode Naagu | | |
| 1974 | Alluri Seetharama Raju | | |
| 1974 | Samsaram Sagaram | | |
| 1974 | Andaru Dongale | | |
| 1974 | Manchi Manushulu | | |
| 1975 | Babu | | |
| 1975 | Mutyala Muggu | Contractor | |
| 1976 | Bhakta Kannappa | Kailasanatha Sastry | |
| 1976 | Raaja | Bhupathi Varma | |
| 1976 | Iddaru Iddare | | |
| 1976 | Ramarajyamlo Rakthapatam | | |
| 1976 | Monagadu | Dada | |
| 1976 | Bangaru Manishi | Satyam | |
| 1976 | Pichi Maraju | Dr. Madhu | |
| 1976 | Jyothi | Dr. Karunakaram | |
| 1976 | 1977 | Kurukshetram | Shalya |
| Eetharam Manishi | 1977 | Kameshwara Rao | |
| Chanakya Chandragupta | 1977 | | |
| Kalpana | 1977 | | |
| Moratodu | 1977 | | |
| Bhale Alludu | 1977 | | |
| Sneham | 1977 | | |
| Yama Gola | 1977 | | |
| Bangaru Bommalu | 1977 | | |
| 1978 | Pranam Khareedu | Kanakaiah | |
| 1978 | Athani Kante Ghanudu | | |
| 1978 | Mana Voori Pandavulu | Rambhoopal (Dora vaaru) | |
| 1978 | Chilipi Krishnudu | | |
| 1978 | Katakataala Rudraiah | | |
| 1978 | Pottelu Punnamma | Sripathi | |
| 1978 | Gorantha Deepam | | |
| 1978 | Anugraham | Konduraswamy | |
| 1978 | Kalanthakulu | Kanaka Rao | |
| 1979 | Rangoon Rowdy | Gopal Rao | |
| 1979 | Vetagadu | Dhiwanji | |
| 1979 | Driver Ramudu | | |
| 1979 | Maa Voollo Mahasivudu | Lord Shiva | |
| 1979 | Vijaya | | |
| 1979 | Pancha Bhoothalu | | |
| 1979 | Viyyala Vari Kayyalu | | |
| 1979 | Samajaniki Saval | Rajasekharam | |
| 1980 | Bangaru Bava | Ramaswami | |
| 1980 | Bebbuli | Jagannatham | |
| 1980 | Gharana Donga | Babu Lal | |
| 1980 | Vintha Dongalu | | |
| 1980 | Circus Ramudu | | |
| 1980 | Pasupu Parani | | |
| 1980 | Sardar Papa Rayudu | | |
| 1980 | Adrushtavanthudu | Narayana | |
| 1980 | Saradaa Ramudu | | |
| 1980 | Bandodu Gundamma | Dasaratharamaiah | |
| 1980 | Kaliyuga Ravana Surudu | | |
| 1980 | Gopala Rao Gari Ammayi | Gopal Rao | |
| 1981 | Todu Dongalu | | |
| 1981 | Ragile Jwala | Dharma Raju | |
| 1981 | Kondaveeti Simham | | |
| 1981 | Kirayi Rowdylu | Baburao | |
| 1981 | Tyagayya | Japesam | |
| 1981 | Ooriki Monagadu | | |
| 1981 | Nayudu gari abbai | | |
| 1981 | Taxi Driver | Bhaskara Rao | |
| 1981 | Maa Voori Pedda Manushulu | | |
| 1981 | Gadasari Atta Sogasari Kodalu | Kanaka Rao | |
| 1982 | Bobbili Puli | Bhanoji Rao | |
| 1982 | Nipputo Chelagaatam | Jagapati | |
| 1982 | Patnam Vachina Pativrathalu | Malish Man | |
| 1982 | Kalahala Kapuram | Gandabherundam | |
| 1982 | Prathikaram | Alexander | |
| 1982 | Raaga Deepam | | |
| 1982 | Andagaadu | | |
| 1982 | Justice Chowdhary | Kailasam | |
| 1982 | Shamsher Shankar | Dharmaraju | |
| 1982 | Devatha | | |
| 1982 | Swayamvaram | | |
| 1982 | Billa Ranga | | |
| 1982 | Eenadu | | |
| 1982 | Krishnarajunulu | | |
| 1982 | Bangaru Bhoomi | Chander Rao | |
| 1982 | Trisulam | | |
| 1982 | Pralaya Rudrudu | Sarvarayudu/Nalla Trachu | |
| 1983 | Shakthi | Chinthapikkala Narasaraju | |
| 1983 | Abhilasha | Sarvothama Rao | |
| 1983 | Kirayi Kotigadu | Adiseshaiah | |
| 1983 | Khaidi | Veerabhadraiah | |
| 1983 | Ramarajyamlo Bheemaraju | Ramaraju | |
| 1983 | Chattaniki Veyyi Kallu | Kitukula Damodara Swamy aka K.D. Swamy | |
| 1983 | Sangarshana | | |
| 1983 | Praja Rajyam | Raja Rao | |
| 1983 | Kanthayya Kanakayya | Kanakayya | |
| 1983 | Mundadugu | Phanibhushan Rao | |
| 1983 | Poratam | | |
| 1983 | Nijam Chepite Nerama | Panakalu | |
| 1983 | Prema Pichollu | | |
| 1983 | Gudachari No.1 | Govinda Rao | |
| 1983 | Maga Maharaju | | Dual roles |
| 1983 | Chanda Sasanudu | | |
| 1983 | Adavi Simhalu | | |
| 1984 | Goonda | Dharmaraju | |
| 1984 | Bangaru Kapuram | Gajapathi | |
| 1984 | Kanchu Kagada | Phanindra | |
| 1984 | Hero | | |
| 1984 | Mukkopi | | |
| 1984 | Kode Trachu | Blackjack | |
| 1984 | Mahanagaramlo Mayagadu | | |
| 1984 | Ooha Sundari | | |
| 1984 | Punyam Koddi Purushudu | Sarvamangalam | |
| 1984 | Bobbili Brahmanna | | |
| 1984 | Rama Rao Gopal Rao | | |
| 1984 | Challenge | RamMohanRao | |
| 1984 | Intiguttu | | |
| 1984 | Yuddham | Panakalu | |
| 1984 | Naagu | | |
| 1984 | Agni Gundam | | |
| 1984 | Dandayatra | Tata Rao | |
| 1984 | Rustum | | |
| 1984 | Sampoorna Premayanam | | |
| 1984 | Danavudu | Ravulapalem Raja Ramagopala Rao | |
| 1985 | Ooriki Soggadu | Nayudamma | |
| 1985 | Agni Parvatam | | |
| 1985 | Chattamtho Poratam | Lokeswara Rao | |
| 1985 | Puli | J.K. | |
| 1985 | Donga | | |
| 1985 | Adavi Donga | Thodella Appalanaidu | |
| 1985 | Pattabhishekham | Markandeylu | |
| 1985 | Musugu Donga | | |
| 1985 | Kongumudi | Suribabu | |
| 1985 | Jackie | | |
| 1985 | Devalayam | | |
| 1985 | Bullet | | |
| 1986 | Ravana Brahma | Govardhan Rao | |
| 1986 | Brahmastram | Gopanna | |
| 1986 | Oka Radha Iddaru Krishnulu | Narasimham | |
| 1986 | Rakshashudu | JK | |
| 1986 | Chanakya Shapadham | Rana | |
| 1986 | Jailu Pakshi | Chakrapani | |
| 1986 | Jayam Manade | Jodugulla Basavappa | |
| 1986 | Anasuyamma Gari Alludu | Lokeswara Rao | |
| 1986 | Konaseema Kurradu | | |
| 1986 | Krishna Garadi | Idea Appa Rao | |
| 1986 | Sravana Sandhya | | |
| 1986 | Kondaveeti Raja | Papa Rao | |
| 1986 | Magadheerudu | | |
| 1986 | Kaliyuga Krishnudu | Siddheshwara Rao | |
| 1986 | Apoorva Sahodarulu | Bangarraju | |
| 1987 | Sahasa Samrat | Raghavaiah | |
| 1987 | Trimurtulu | Damodaram | |
| 1987 | Bharatamlo Arjunudu | Benerjee | |
| 1987 | Bhargava Ramudu | | |
| 1987 | Kulala Kurukshetram | | |
| 1987 | Inti Donga | Veerabhadraiah | |
| 1987 | Vijetha Vikram | Rudra Bhupathi | |
| 1987 | Sardar Krishnama Naidu | Sasibhushan Rao | |
| 1987 | Kirai Dada | | |
| 1987 | Donga Mogudu | Chenchuramaiah | |
| 1988 | Manchi Donga | | |
| 1988 | Yamudiki Mogudu | Veerabhadraiah | |
| 1988 | Tiragabadda Telugubidda | Mayor Sisupala Rao | |
| 1988 | Station Master | | |
| 1988 | Donga Ramudu | | |
| 1988 | Chinnabaabu | | |
| 1989 | Bhale Donga | Viswanatham Master | |
| 1989 | Rudranetra | | |
| 1989 | Vintha Dongalu | Vaayuvegula Vishnumurthy | |
| 1989 | Bala Gopaludu | | |
| 1989 | State Rowdy | Narendra Bhupathi | |
| 1989 | Athaku Yamudu Ammayiki Mogudu | Vinayaka Rao aka V.R. Bongarala | |
| 1990 | Kondaveeti Donga | Sarabhoji | |
| 1990 | Raja Vikramarka | Viswanatham | |
| 1990 | Lorry Driver | | |
| 1990 | Manasu Mamata | | |
| 1990 | Kaliyuga Abhimanyudu | Janakiramaiah | |
| 1991 | Gang Leader | Ekambaram | |
| 1991 | Coolie No. 1 | | |
| 1992 | Gharana Mogudu | Bapineedu | |
| 1992 | Dabbu Bhale Jabbu | | |
| 1992 | Aa Okkati Adakku | Royyala Naidu | |
| 1993 | Allari Priyudu | | |
| 1993 | Dongalludu | | |
| 1993 | Nippu Ravva | Labour Minister | |
| 1993 | Bangaru Bullodu | Ramadasu | |
| 1993 | Allari Alludu | | |
| 1994 | Kurradhi Kurradu | Koteswara Prasad | |
| 1994 | Prema & Co. | | Final film role |
