= Maga Maharaju =

Magamaharaju
- Poster
- Directed by: Vijaya Bapineedu
- Written by: Akella Venkata Suryanarayana
- Screenplay by: Vijaya Bapineedu
- Produced by: Maganti Ravindranath Chowdary
- Starring: Chiranjeevi; Suhasini; Rao Gopal Rao
- Cinematography: M. V. Raghu
- Edited by: K. Satyam
- Music by: Krishna-Chakra
- Release date: 15 July 1983
- Running time: 145 minutes
- Language: Telugu

Maga Maharaju is a 1983 Telugu film directed by Vijaya Bapineedu and produced by Syam Prasad Arts. The film features Chiranjeevi, Suhasini, Rao Gopal Rao, Udaykumar and Annapurna in lead roles. It was a commercial success. This film was remade in Hindi as Ghar Sansar in 1986.

== Plot ==
Raju (Chiranjeevi) is an unemployed young man burdened with numerous responsibilities and family commitments. He is expected to provide for his unmarried sister and ailing parents, who rely heavily on him. Amids these challenges, Raju meets Suhasini, a young woman from a wealthy family, who falls in love with him.

To alleviate his financial struggles, Raju participates in a grueling bicycle race, cycling nonstop for eight days. His determination pays off as he wins this competition and secures the prize money. Subsequently, Suhasini marries Raju and helps solves his family's difficulties, bringing stability to their lives.

== Cast ==
- Chiranjeevi as Ravi Raj "Raju"
- Suhasini as Jaya
- Udaykumar as Raghavayya, Raju's father
- Rallapalli as Police Officer
- Nirmalamma as Raju's grandmother
- Rao Gopal Rao in a dual role as Bhujanga Rao and Varalu
- Annapurna as Raju's mother
- Rohini as Raju' younger sister
- Balaji as Krishna, Raju's younger brother
- Tulasi as Saraswati, Raju's younger sister
- Hema Sundar
- Nutan Prasad as Raghavayya's brother-in-law
- Dham
- Anuradha

== Production ==
When T. S. B. K. Moulee was unable to adjust his schedule for the film, Vijaya Bapineedu stepped in as the director. Under Bapineedu's direction, the film was successfully completed and achieved commercial success, leading to further directorial projects for him.

== Music ==
Music was composed by Krishna-Chakra.

No.	Title	Singer(s)	Length
1.	"Nee Dari"	S. P. Balasubrahmanyam	6:07
2.	"Annalo Anna"	Madhavapeddi Ramesh	3:04
3.	"Site Ramudi"	Vani Jayaram	3:50
4.	"Nelalu Ninde"	S. Janaki, S. P. Balasubrahmanyam	3:43
5.	"Maa Amma Chintamani"	S. P. Sailaja	5:35
