= Prema Pichollu =

- Poster
- Directed by: A. Kodandarami Reddy
- Produced by: M.Ramesh, S.Jaya Ramarao
- Starring: Chiranjeevi; Radhika; Kavitha; Gummadi; Rao Gopal Rao; Allu Rama Lingaiah
- Music by: K. Chakravarthy
- Release date: 14 January 1983
- Country: India
- Language: Telugu

Prema Pichollu (transl. Mad Lovers) is a 1983 Telugu-language comedy film directed by A. Kodandarami Reddy. A remake of Basu Chatterjee's 1982 film Shoukheeen, the film stars Chiranjeevi and Radhika with Kavitha, Gummadi, Rao Gopal Rao and Allu Rama Lingaiah in supporting comic roles.

== Plot ==
Chiranjeevi plays Ravi, who is an unemployed post-graduate and in love with Prema (Radhika). Prema is a dancer in a local bar and attracts her boss Allu Ramalingayya and his friends Simham (Rao gopal Rao) and Gummadi. 3 old friends meet in Vizag and plan to trap Prema. Ravi manages to get a job at their place as a driver, without revealing his identity. He takes the help of Gummadi's son. Ravi and Prema use this opportunity of living at same place and get much closer. Three old men plan traps for Prema and each boasts about how efficiently they trapped her, when other two were away in their car with Ravi. A drunkard takes photos of theirs in compromising conditions and Ravi misunderstands Prema in this issue. Later three old men realize how their behaviour has affected a young couple's love, feel ashamed of their behaviour and reveal the truth to Ravi and unite them. Ravi is offered a job in Gummadi's factory, Prema a permanent job in Allu's hotel, and a house by Simham. Comedy generated by 3 old men is hilarious, especially when they describe the episodes when each narrates how he handled Prema.

== Cast ==
- Chiranjeevi as Ravi
- Radhika as Prema
- Kavitha as Leela
- Gummadi as Chowdhary
- Rao Gopal Rao as Narasimha Murthy aka Simham
- Allu Rama Lingaiah as Jeedeipikkala Balaiah aka J.P. Bal
- Sudhakar as Vinod
- Nirmalamma as Prema's grandmother
- Pushpalatha as Chowdhary's wife
- Suryakantham as Bal's wife

== Soundtrack ==
1. "Chali Chaliga" -
2. "Donga Raraa" -
3. "E Muddabanthi" -
4. "Gal Gal" -
5. "O Batasari" -
