= Aalaya Sikharam =

- Theatrical release poster
- Directed by: Kodi Ramakrishna
- Starring: Chiranjeevi; Sumalatha; Gollapudi Maruthi Rao; Kaikala Satyanarayana
- Music by: Satyam
- Release date: 7 May 1983
- Country: India
- Language: Telugu

Aalaya Sikharam is a 1983 Telugu-language film directed by Kodi Ramakrishna. The film stars Chiranjeevi and Sumalatha.

== Plot ==
Chiranjeevi plays a horse-cab driver role in this movie. He is the second son of Gollapudi, who is jobless and sells everything possible for gambling. Ranganath is Chiru's elder brother – the only educated person in the family. Chiru works hard to see his brother succeed after completing school, but Ranganath ditches his family and joins Satyanarayana's factory, who eventually woos him to become his son-in-law. Sumalatha sells flowers and is in love with Chiru. She stands by Chiru when he faces troubles, both from his brother and father. After Ranganath left them, Chiru takes up the responsibility of his family, and tries to get his sister's marital life settled. But Ranganath refuses to recognize Chiru's family in society, and publicly insults them. Satyanarayana uses Ranganath to solve his professional problems, and then frames him in a murder case. Despite Ranganath's hatred towards his family, Chiru helps him out of the case and exposes Satyanarayana's evil intentions. Ranganath and Gollapudi realize their responsibilities and a happy family reunion takes place.

== Cast ==
- Chiranjeevi as Seenu
- Sumalatha as Radha
- Kaikala Satyanarayana as Satyamurthy
- Ranganath as Rajashekhar
- Gollapudi Maruti Rao
- Mucherla Aruna as Thayaru
- Rallapalli as Avatharam
- P.L.Narayana as P.L. Narasimham
- Reena
- Dubbing Janaki
