= Kottapeta Rowdy =

- Theatrical release poster
- Directed by: P. Sambasiva Rao
- Produced by: Suryanarayana; Satyanarayana
- Starring: Krishna; Jaya Prada; Chiranjeevi
- Music by: K. V. Mahadevan
- Production company: Satya Chitra
- Release date: 7 March 1980
- Country: India
- Language: Telugu

Kottapeta Rowdy is a 1980 Indian Telugu-language action drama film, produced by Suryanarayana, Satyanarayana under Satya Chitra banner and directed by P. Sambasiva Rao. It stars Krishna, Jaya Prada in lead roles while Chiranjeevi in special appearance and music composed by K. V. Mahadevan.

== Cast ==
- Krishna as Krishna
- Jaya Prada as Radha
- Chiranjeevi as Prasanna Kumar
- Nutan Prasad as Kailasam
- Mohan Babu as Vaikuntham
- Rallapalli
- P. L. Narayana
- Kaikala Satyanarayana as Punyakoti
- Pandari Bai as Krishna's mother
- Sarathi
- C.H. Narayana Rao as Prasanna Kumar's father
- Jyothi Lakshmi as Ranjani
- Chalapathi Rao
- R.Narayanamurthy
- Lakshmikanth
