= Mahanagaramlo Mayagadu =

- Poster
- Directed by: Vijaya Bapineedu
- Produced by: Maganti Ravindranath Chowdary
- Starring: Chiranjeevi; Vijayashanti; Rao Gopal Rao; Allu Ramalingaiah
- Cinematography: M. V. Raghu
- Music by: Satyam
- Release date: 28 June 1984
- Country: India
- Language: Telugu

Mahanagaramlo Mayagadu (transl. Conman of the city) is a 1984 Indian Telugu-language film directed by Vijaya Bapineedu. The film stars Chiranjeevi and Vijayashanti.

== Plot ==
Chiranjeevi plays the role of Raja, whose main aims are to make money by hook or by crook, and get his sister married. His father commits suicide after being accused of theft and his mother dies of disease. Unable to bear the poverty in his village, he leaves his sister at his friend's place and ends up in the city, using the name Mayagadu, making money by every possible means. He ends up in a police colony, in Sub-inspector Allu's house as a preacher. Vijayasanthi, who knows his real identity, tries in every possible way to get him out of that place and finally succeeds. However, later when she learns Raja's bitter past, she decides to help him. Giribabu, who is the son-in-law of the SP, hates his wife and has an affair with Chanchala (Jayamalini), who is a dancer at a club. This club is managed by Jyothilaxmi, who is Nutan Prasad's wife, but lives with the club's owner. Giribabu plans to kill his wife, but instead unknowingly ties up his lover in a bag and throws her in a river. Raja's brother-in-law notices this and saves her, but is framed in her murder case and jailed. Later Raja realizes his mistake and frees him from police custody. On his way to find out the real culprit, he realizes that Chanchala is alive and that the club owners killed another dancer and framed him to save Giribabu. Meanwhile, Raja's sister arrives in the city in search of her husband and brother, and stays at the SP's house. Raja deceives the SP and brings her out and with the help of Nutan Prasad, who is the nephew of the SP, unfolds the details of the case and frees his brother-in-law.

== Cast ==
- Chiranjeevi as Raja
- Vijayashanti
- Allu Ramalingaiah
- Rao Gopal Rao
- Sangeeta
- Nutan Prasad
- Giri Babu
- Udaya Kumar
- Suthi Velu
- Nirmalamma
- Jayamalini
- Anuradha
- Mukku Raju
- Sangili Murugan
- Balaji
- Chandrika
- Jyothi Lakshmi
- T. S. B. K. Moulee
- Allu Aravind
- Mamatha

== Soundtrack ==
- "Hari Katha" -
- "Mahanagaramlo Mayagadu" -
- "Vuduku Vuduku" -
- "Yedhava Vatti Yedhava" -
