= Srirasthu Subhamasthu =

- Theatrical release poster
- Directed by: Katta Subba Rao
- Starring: Chiranjeevi, Saritha, Nutan Prasad, Kavitha
- Release date: 26 September 1981
- Country: India
- Language: Telugu

Srirasthu Subhamasthu is a 1981 Indian Telugu-language film starring Chiranjeevi, Saritha and Kavitha.It is a remake of the 1980 Tamil Movie Illamai Kolam.

== Cast ==
- Chiranjeevi
- Saritha
- Nutan Prasad
- Kavitha
- Suvarna
- Athili Lakshmi
- P.L. Narayana
- Jagarlamudi Radhakrishna Murthy
- Chittibabu
- Echuri
- Mallikarjun Rao
- J.V. Ramana Murthy
- M. Prabhakar Reddy
- Rajanala
- C.H. Krishna Murthy
- Mikkilineni Jagadish Babu
- Vyas Chand

== Soundtrack ==
No.	Title	Singer(s)	Length
1.	"Chinukanti Nadummeedha"	S. P. Balasubrahmanyam, S.P. Sailaja	3:10
2.	"Sreerasthu Subhamasthu"	S. P. Balasubrahmanyam, P. Susheela	3:08
3.	"Hai Krishna"	P. Susheela	4:26
4.	"Komalangi Vatchindiro"	S. P. Balasubrahmanyam	3:14
5.	"Sri Devi Nadevi"	S. P. Balasubrahmanyam	3:07
6.	"Sreerasthu Subhamasthu (pathos)"	P. Susheela
