= Naagu =

- Theatrical poster
- Directed by: T. L. V. Prasad
- Produced by: AVM Kumaran; Padma Kumaran; AVM K. Shanmugam
- Starring: Chiranjeevi; Radha
- Production company: AVM Productions
- Release date: 11 October 1984
- Country: India
- Language: Telugu

Naagu is a 1984 Tollywood film directed by Tatineni Prasad and produced by AVM Productions. This film stars Chiranjeevi, Radha and Jaggayya.

== Plot ==
Naagu (Chiranjeevi) is a small-time criminal by profession. He has Rajani (Radha) as his love interest. One day, Rajani falls from the top floor of a hotel and dies. Her death is suspected as murder and suspicion falls on Naagu. Naagu's mother later reveals that Naagu's father was killed by a person called Jagapati Rao ( Kongara Jaggayya) and Rajani's murder was also committed by him. Now, its Naagu's turn to prove his innocence by gaining evidence against Jagapati Rao and bring him to justice. How Naagu succeeds in his mission forms the climax of this movie.

== Cast ==
- Chiranjeevi as Naagu
- Radha as Raji
- Satyanarayana as Parvathalu
- Jaggayya as Jagapati Rao
- Haranath as Soori
- Annapurna as Naagu's mother
- Mikkilineni
- Mallikarjuna Rao as Food seller on station
