= Kukka Katuku Cheppu Debba =

- Theatrical poster
- Directed by: Eranki Sharma
- Written by: C. Purushotham
- Produced by: Chalasani Gopi
- Starring: Chiranjeevi; Narayana Rao; Madhavi; Pallavi Yellapragada
- Narrated by: Eranki Sarma
- Cinematography: R. Raghunatha Reddy
- Edited by: D. Venkata Ratnam
- Music by: M. S. Viswanathan
- Production company: Saradhi Studios
- Release date: 1 March 1979
- Country: India
- Language: Telugu

Kukka Katuku Cheppu Debba (transl. Tit for tat) is a 1979 Indian Telugu-language film starring Chiranjeevi and Madhavi. The film was remade in Tamil as Rani Theni (1982).

== Plot ==
Sekhar (Chiranjeevi) is Vankayala's grandson who spends time by playing guitar and flirting with girls. Parvati (Madhavi) is daughter of his neighbor. Sekhar flirts with a girl who repairs his guitar and teaches her how to play it. He also acts as if he loves Rukmini (Pallavi), who is daughter of Raghavayya (Rallapalli). Parvati hates Sekhar and his behavior and always tries to avoid him. Satyam (Narayana Rao) and his family likes Parvati and fixes engagement with her family. Out of curiosity to meet Parvati, Satyam comes to her home on some reasons but unable to directly talk to her, writes a letter requesting her to come and meet him in backyard at night if she loves him, else he will break engagement. Parvati comes to meet him, where she is seduced. This continues for second night too, but Parvati is shocked when Satyam throws torch light on her and she finds herself in arms of Sekhar. Satyam is heart broken and leaves her. Rest of the story you can see in the movie.

== Cast ==
- Chiranjeevi as Shekar
- Madhavi as Parvati
- Pallavi as Kanakam
- Narayana Rao
- Hema Sundar
- P. L. Narayana
- Rallapalli
- Satyannarayana Vankayala
- Laxmikanth

== Cinematography ==
- R. Raghunatha Reddy

== Soundtrack ==
The music was composed by M.S. Viswanathan and Lyrics were written by Acharya Athreya

No.	Title	Lyrics	Music	Singer(s)	Length
1.	"Yemandi Yemanukokandi"	Acharya Athreya	M.S. Viswanathan	P. Susheela	4:59
2.	"Hei Baby Kani Kani Kaipulona"	Acharya Athreya	M.S. Viswanathan	S.P. Balasubrahmanyam, Ramola
3.	"Intha Manchodivaithe"	Acharya Athreya	M.S. Viswanathan	L. R. Eswari, G. Anand	4:45
4.	"Andhala Ramudu"	Acharya Athreya	M.S. Viswanathan	S.P. Balasubrahmanyam, Vani Jairam
5.	"Kannuvantidhi Aadadhi"	Acharya Athreya	M.S. Viswanathan	S.P. Balasubrahmanyam	4:26
