= Nutan Prasad =

Indian actor (1945–2011)

- Born: Tadinada Varaprasad; 12 December 1945; Kaikaluru, Madras Presidency, British India
- Died: 30 March 2011 (aged 65); Hyderabad, Andhra Pradesh, India
- Occupation: Actor
- Years active: 1973–2011
- Awards: Nandi Award

Tadinada Varaprasad, popularly known as Nutan Prasad (12 December 1945 – 30 March 2011) was an Indian actor who worked predominantly in Telugu cinema and Telugu theatre. He was a native of Kaikaluru, Andhra Pradesh, India. He started his film acting career in the early 1970s, and has received four state Nandi Awards. He died due to prolonged illness at the age of 65.

== Career ==
In a career spanning over three decades, he acted in about a hundred films in myriad roles ranging from a villain to comedian among others.

=== Debut and recognition ===
Nutan Prasad started his acting career with the play Naa Votu in Guntur. His debut movie was Andala Ramudu, starring along with Akkineni Nageshwara Rao in the year 1973. He continued his acting career with movies like Needaleni Aadadi, and his first major break as an actor with potential came from the movie Muthyala Muggu; he acted as a villain along with Rao Gopal Rao.

His acting career reached its peak with the movie Rajadhi Raju in which he acted as Satan. The movie became a hit and the song choreographed on him "Kotta Devudandi", is still popular today. Nutan Prasad costarred with all the generations of heroes. He starred in successful movies like Patnam Vachina Pativratalu, Khaidi, Magamaharaju, Srivariki Premalekha, Kathanayakudu, and Aha Naa Pellanta.

Prasad was known for his dialogues like "Desham chala klista paristhiti lo undi" (transl. The country is in a very difficult situation) and "Nootokka jillalaku andagadni" (transl. I am one of the most handsome persons from 101 districts). The latter was adapted as a title for the film Nootokka Jillala Andagadu (2021).

After a major accident on set of the movie Bamma Maata Bangaru Baata, he was left paralyzed and became a wheelchair user. He then quit acting in movies fulltime and appeared in guest roles. He also did voiceover and commentary for serials and movies. He dubbed for late Gummadi in Aayanaki Iddaru (1995). Nutan Prasad became the narrator of the hit crime reality show in ETV-2 Neralu Ghoralu. He was appreciated by the Telugu TV audience for his narrative style and voice in Neralu Ghoralu.

=== Accident on the sets of Bamma Maata Bangaru Baata ===
In 1989, while shooting for the film Bamma Maata Bangaru Baata, he had an accident with his costar, Rajendra Prasad and broke his back. The accident left him paralysed from the waist down and he became a wheelchair user for the rest of his life.

== Death ==
He died after prolonged illness at the age of 65 years on 30 March 2011 in Hyderabad.

== Awards ==
Nandi Awards

- Best Supporting Actor–Sundari Subbarao (1984)
- Best Villain–Praja Swamyam (1987)
- Best Villain–Nava Bharatam (1988)
- Best Supporting Actor–Vasundhara (1992)
- NTR National Award (2005)

== Partial filmography ==
Year	Film	Role	Notes
1973	Andala Ramudu	Giri	Film debut
1975	Muthyala Muggu	Kishtayya	
1978	Chali Cheemalu	Tmmalapadu Chinapaddayya	
1978	Pranam Khareedu	Karanam Bullabbai	
1979	Kudi Yedamaithe	Dattudu	
1979	Cheyyethi Jai Kottu	Balwanta Rao	
1979	President Peramma	Peddiraju	
1979	Chaaya		
1979	Seethe Ramudaithe	Lingam	
1979	Mande Gundelu		
1979	Samajaniki Saval	Jaggu	
1980	Kottapeta Rowdy	Kailasam	
1980	Thathayya Premaleelalu	Thathayya	
1980	Konte Mogudu Penki Pellam	Ahobilam	
1980	Pelli Gola	Chantibabu	
1981	Srirasthu Subhamasthu		
1981	Maro Kurukshetram		
1981	Prema Natakam	Prem Kumar	
1982	Maro Malupu		
1982	Jagannatha Rathachakralu	Govardhan	
1982	Patnam Vachina Pativrathalu		
1982	Kayyala Ammayi Kalavari Abbayi	Mukkoti	
1982	Tingu Rangadu		
1983	Iddaru Kiladilu		
1983	Idhi Kaadu Mugimpu	Prajapathi Rao	
1983	Raghuramudu	Ashtalakshmi Prasanna Siddhanthi	
1983	Kalyana Veena		
1983	Chattaniki Veyyi Kallu	Maavullayya	
1983	Mayagadu	Bhushanam	
1983	Khaidi	Munsiff	
1983	Rajkumar		
1983	Maa Inti Premayanam		
1983	Maga Maharaju		
1983	Manthrigari Viyyankudu		
1983	Lanke Bindelu	Inspector Suryam	
1984	Koteeswarudu	Paratparam aka Small Boss	
1984	Bobbili Brahmanna	Markandeya Sastry	
1984	Intiguttu		
1984	Danavudu		
1984	Kondaveeti Nagulu	Muddukrishna	
1984	Mukkopi		
1984	Bhale Ramudu	Kanaka Rao	
1984	Seethamma Pelli		
1984	Mahanagaramlo Mayagadu		
1984	Dandayatra		
1984	Rustum	Chalapathi	
1984	Srivariki Premalekha	Bhaskaram	
1984	Railu Dopidi	Nagendra	
1984	Goonda		
1984	Ee Charitra Inkennallu	Bhagavan	
1985	Palnati Simham	Veeranna	
1985	Kongumudi	Anjaneyulu	
1985	Adavi Donga		
1985	Illale Devata		
1985	Agni Parvatam		
1985	Chattamtho Poratam	Jailor Hitler Sharma	
1985	Chiranjeevi	Pala Ramudu	
1985	Nyayam Meere Cheppali		
1985	Vijetha		
1985	Visha Kanya		
1985	Nerasthudu	Keshava Varma	
1985	Sri Katna Leelalu	Neelakantham	
1985	Alaya Deepam		
1985	Bangaru Chilaka	Balaram	
1985	Pattabhishekam		
1985	Dongallo Dora		
1985	Kattula Kondayya		
1985	Puli	Inspector Shyam	
1985	Donga		
1985	Raktha Sindhuram	Damodaram	
1985	Maharaju	Gopalam	
1985	Pachani Kapuram	Bhujanga Rao	
1986	Kaliyuga Pandavulu		
1986	Oka Radha Iddaru Krishnulu		
1986	Kirathakudu	Baby	
1986	Veta		
1986	Srimathi Kanuka		
1986	Pavithra		
1986	Kaliyuga Krishnudu		
1986	Magadheerudu		
1986	Kondaveeti Raja		
1986	Padaharella Ammayi		
1986	Captain Nagarjun		
1986	Kashmora		
1986	Prema Gharshana		
1986	Krishna Garadi		
1986	Naa Pilupe Prabhanjanam	Rambabu	
1986	Santhi Nivasam		
1986	Desoddharakudu	Narasimha Naidu	
1986	Jayam Manade	Varadarajulu	
1986	Jailu Pakshi	Sambaiah	
1986	Manchi Manasulu	All-In-All Acchaiah	
1986	Adavi Raja	Nanipandu	
1987	Aha Naa Pellanta	Satyanarayana	
1987	Samsaram Oka Chadarangam	Edmund Samuel	
1987	Thene Manasulu	Madanagopal	
1987	Dongodochadu	Surigadu	
1987	Hanthakudi Veta		
1987	Lawyer Bharathi Devi		
1987	Daada		
1987	Dharmapatni	Narasimha Murthy	
1987	President Gari Abbai	Delhi Babai	
1987	Dayamayudu		
1987	Manmadha Leela Kamaraju Gola	Kondala Rao	
1987	Bharatamlo Arjunudu	C.I. Keshava Rao	
1987	Agni Putrudu		
1987	Collector Gari Abbai	Elimudra Ellaiah	
1987	Samrat	Bhanu Prakash	
1987	Sahasa Samrat	Pilliganthula Appala Veera Paidi Kondaiah Samantharaju	
1987	Dabbevariki Chedu		
1988	Chuttalabbayi		
1988	Donga Kollu	Bellam Apparao	
1988	Khaidi No.786		
1988	Tiragabadda Telugubidda	Dr. Chaturvedi	
1988	Rowdy No.1	Tiger Nagaraju	
1988	Maa Inti Maharaju		
1988	Rocky		
1988	Raktha Thilakam		
1988	Rao Gari Illu	Tata Rao	
1988	Bandipotu	Lawyer Ramanaidu	
1988	Chattamto Chadarangam	Simhadri Appanna	
1988	Aakhari Poratam		
1988	Mugguru Kodukulu		
1988	Brahma Puthrudu		
1988	Trinetrudu		
1988	Yudda Bhoomi		
1988	Choopulu Kalasina Subhavela		
1988	Agni Keratalu	Nagendra	
1988	Bharya Bhartalu		
1989	Vijay	Puligolla Parameshwara Rao	
1989	Dhruva Nakshatram	Mattigaddala Manikyala Rao	
1989	Preminchi Choodu	David Gopal Rao	
1989	Aakhari Kshanam		
1989	Goonda Rajyam	Bhagwan Das	
1989	Dorikithe Dongalu		
1989	Chalaki Mogudu Chadastapu Pellam	Proprietor Krishna	
1989	Chennapatnam Chinnollu	Koko, Konaseema Kodandam	
1989	Rajakeeya Chadarangam		
1989	State Rowdy	Bankamatti Bhaskar Rao	
1989	Manchi Kutumbam	Aadamarapu Atmanandam	
1989	Bamma Mata Bangaru Bata		
1989	Rudranetra		
1990	Karthavyam		
1991	Gang Leader	Home Minister Gali Subba Rao	
1991	Surya IPS		
1991	Sarpayagam		
1992	Rowdy Inspector		
1992	Alexander		
1993	Abbaigaaru		
1993	Aadarsham		
1993	Sarasaala Soggadu	Rambanam	
1994	Kurradhi Kurradu	Tandava Krishna	
1995	Big Boss		
1995	Gharana Bullodu		
1995	Taj Mahal		
1997	Master	Canteen-in-charge	
1997	Thoka Leni Pitta		
1998	Suryavamsam		
1998	Kodukulu		
1998	Sri Ramulayya		
1999	Mechanic Mavayya	Home Minister	
2000	Nuvvu Vastavani		
2000	Azad		
2000	Sivanna		
2000	Ninne Premistha		
2000	Chiru Navvutho		
2001	Anandam		
2001	Subbu		
2002	Parasuram	Chandrakanth	
2003	Simhachalam	Judge	
2004	Seenu Vasanthi Lakshmi	Seenu's father	
2005	Youth	Babu's father	
2005	Sadaa Mee Sevalo		
2006	Valliddari Vayasu Padahare	Marriage registration officer	
2006	Photo		
2009	Raju Maharaju		
2011	Srimathi		Kannada film
