= Sobhan Babu filmography =

Sobhan Babu appeared in 230 movies between 1959 and 1996. In almost 200 of those, he acted in a leading role. The following is a list of the films in which he appeared.

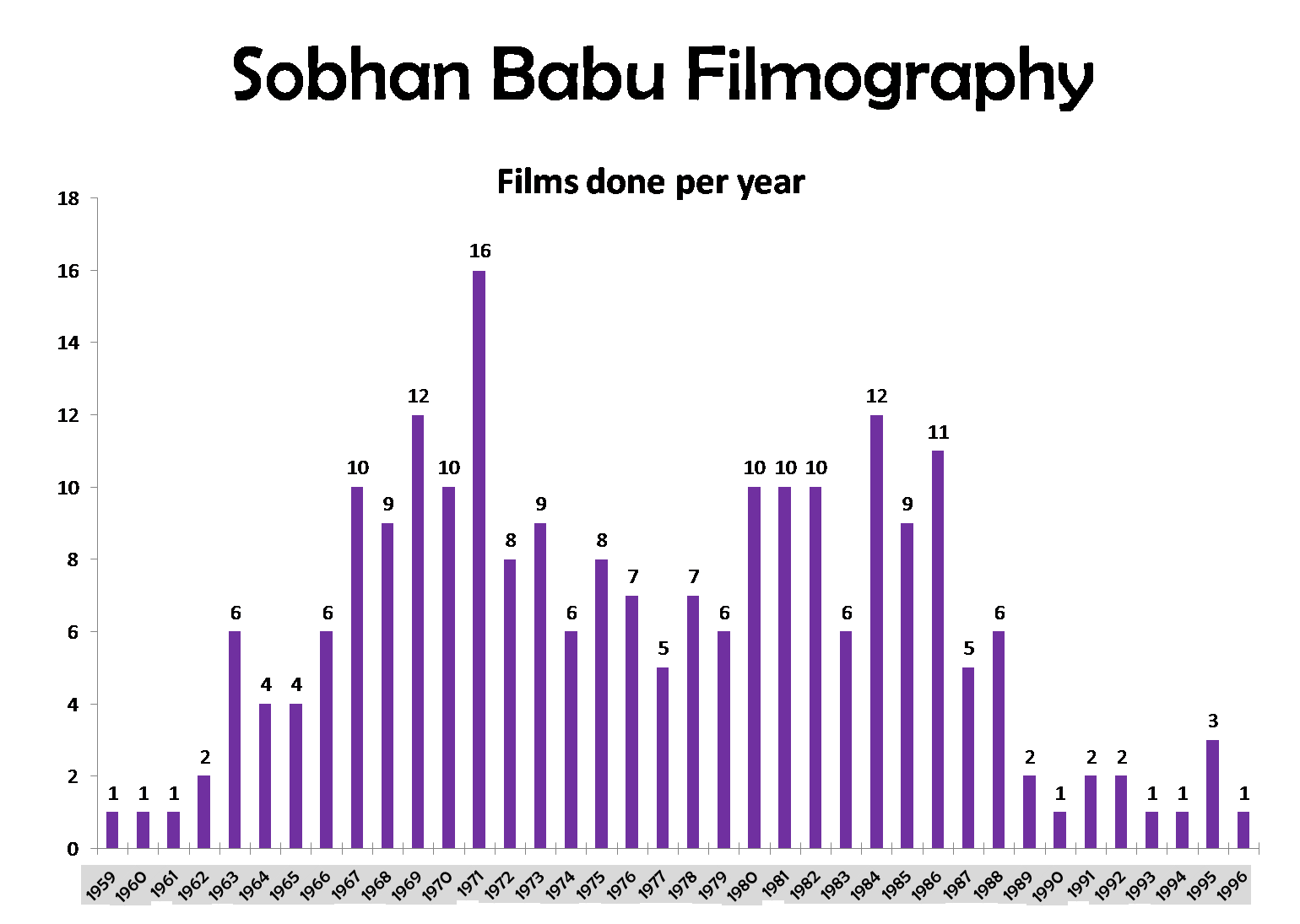
Filmography chart of the films done per year by actor Sobhan Babu

== Filmography ==
Year	Title	Role	Notes
1959	Daiva Balam	Enchanter	
1960	Bhaktha Sabari	Karuna	
1961	Sita Rama Kalyanam	Lakshmana	
1962	Bhishma	Arjuna	
1962	Mahamantri Timmarasu	Govinda Rayalu	
1962	Mahathma Kabir	Rama	Kannada film
1963	Irugu Porugu	Prasad	
1963	Somavara Vrata Mahatyam	Lord Shiva	
1963	Lava Kusa	Shatrughna	
1963	Chaduvukunna Ammayilu	Prabhakar	
1963	Nartanasala	Abhimanyu	
1963	Manchi Chedu		
1964	Shivarathri Mahathme	Narada	Kannada film
1964	Navagraha Pooja Mahima		
1964	Karnan	Chandran	Tamil film
1964	Desa Drohulu	CBI Officer	
1964	Mairaavana		
1965	Sumangali		
1965	Prameelarjuneeyam	Vrushaketu	
1965	Pratigna Palana		
1965	Veerabhimanyu	Abhimanyu	
1965	Prameelarjuneeyam	Vrishaketu	
1966	Sri Krishna Pandaveeyam	Arjuna	
1966	Loguttu Perumaalakeruka		
1966	Paramanandayya Sishyula Katha	Lord Siva	
1966	Potti Pleader	Ramarao / the killer	Double Role
1966	Bhakta Potana		
1966	Gudachari 116	Siva Rao (Agent 303)	
1967	Pinni		
1967	Satyame Jayam		
1967	Sri Krishnavataram	Narada Maharshi	
1967	Punyavati	Sekhar	
1967	Poola Rangadu	Dr. Prasad	
1967	Aada Paduchu	Sekhar	
1967	Rakhta Sindhooram		
1967	Kambhoja Raju Katha		
1967	Poola Rangadu	Dr. Prasad	
1967	Private Master	Raghu	
1968	Bharya		
1968	Chuttarikaalu		
1968	Mana Samsaram		
1968	Pantaalu-Pattimpulu		
1968	Lakshmi Nivasam	Anand	
1968	Jeevita Bandham		
1968	Veeranjaneya	Narada	
1968	Kalisina Manasulu		
1968	Kumkuma Bharine		
1969	Manchi Mitrulu		
1969	Bangaru Panjaram	Venu Gopal	
1969	Vichitra Kutumbam	Raghava	
1969	Sattekalapu Satteyya		
1969	Buddhimantudu	Krishna	
1969	Maamaku Tagga Kodalu		
1969	Nindu Hrudayaalu	Ramu / Chitti Babu	Double Role
1969	Manushulu Marali	Suryam	
1969	Mathru Devata	Raja	
1969	Kannula Panduga		
1969	Tara Sasankam		
1969	Pratheekaram	Anand Babu	
1970	Desamante Manushuloyi		
1970	Bhale Gudachari		
1970	Pettandarulu	Mohan	
1970	Maa Manchi Akkayya		
1970	Pasidi Manasulu		
1970	Jagat Jetteelu	Sikinder	
1970	Talli Dandrulu		
1970	Mayani Mamata	Ravi	
1970	Inti Gouravam		
1970	Iddaru Ammayilu		
1971	Sisindri Chittibabu		
1971	Mooga Prema		
1971	Kathaanaayakuraalu		
1971	Vichitra Daampatyam		
1971	Debbaku Taa Dongala Muthaa	Pratap	
1971	Sati Anasuya		
1971	Kalyana Mandapam	Ramu	
1971	Bangaaru Talli		
1971	Naa Tammudu		
1971	Chinnanati Snehitulu	Ravi	
1971	Ramalayam	Gopi	
1971	Kooturu Kodalu		
1971	Talli Kutullu		
1971	Tahsildar Gari Ammayi	Prasada Rao and Vasu	Double Role
1971	Chelleli Kapuram	Ramu	
1971	Jagath Janthrilu	Bharath	
1972	Amma Maata		
1972	Sampoorna Ramayanam	Rama	
1972	Vamshoddhaarakudu		
1972	Kilaadi Bullodu		
1972	Shanti Nilayam		
1972	Manavudu Danavudu	Dr. Venu and Jagan	Double Role
1972	Kalam Marindi	Srinivas	
1973	Pedda Koduku		
1973	Jeevana Tarangalu	Vijay	
1973	Sarada	Husband / Doctor	Double Role
1973	Jeevitam		
1973	Puttinillu Mettinillu	Ravi	
1973	Minor Babu		
1973	Idaa Lokam		
1973	Doctor Babu	Sekhar	
1973	Ganga Manga	Ravi	
1974	Kannavari Kalalu		
1974	Khaidi Babai		
1974	Kode Nagu		
1974	Andaru Dongale	Kumar	
1974	Chakravakam	Kiran	
1974	Manchi Manushulu	Gopi	
1975	Devudu Chesina Pelli	Buchi Babu	
1975	Andaru Manchivare	Ranganna	
1975	Babu		
1975	Jeevana Jyoti	Vasu	
1975	Balipeetam	Bhaskar	
1975	Jebu Donga	Raja	
1975	Gunavanthudu		
1975	Soggadu	Sobhanadri (Soggadu)	
1976	Picchi Maaraaju		
1976	Iddaroo Iddare		
1976	Prema Bandham		
1976	Raju Vedale		
1976	Pogarubotu		
1976	Monagadu	Raja and Ravi Kumar	Double Role
1976	Raaja	Raaja	
1977	Kurukshetram	Krishna	
1977	Ee Taram Manishi		
1977	Jeevita Nauka		
1977	Khaidi Kalidasu	D.S.P. Vijayabhaskar and Kalidasu	Double Role
1977	Gadusu Pillodu	Sudarshanam and Ravi	
1978	Naayudu Baava	Raju	
1978	Nindu Manishi		
1978	Manchi Babai		
1978	Kalaantakulu	Raghu	
1978	Mallepoovu		
1978	Radha Krishna		
1978	Enki Naayud Baava		
1979	Raama Baanam		
1979	Bangaaru Chellelu		
1979	Karthika Deepam	Sridhara Rao and Raja	Double Role
1979	Judagadu	Vijay	
1979	Mande Gundelu	Kalyan	
1979	Gorintaku	Ramu	
1980	Mahalakshmi	Shankaram	
1980	Chandipriya	Indranil	
1980	Kaksha		
1980	Mosagadu	Jagan	
1980	Sannaayi Appanna		
1980	Chesina Basalu		
1980	Dharma Chakram		
1980	Kodallostunnaaru Jagratha	Raghava Rao and Ravi	Double Role
1980	Ramudu Parasuramudu		
1980	Maanavudu Mahaneeyudu		
1980	Deeparadhana	Rajendra Prasad	
1981	Pandanti Jeevitham		
1981	Jagamondi	Raghava Rao and Vijay alias Jagamondi	Double Role
1981	Devudu Mavayya		
1981	Illaalu		
1981	Samsaram Santhanam		
1981	Jeevitha Ratham	Krishna	
1981	Gharaanaa Gangulu		
1981	Girija Kalyanam		
1981	Alludugaru Zindabad	Vasu	
1982	Vamsa Gouravam	Rajasekharam	
1982	Iddaru Kodukulu	Raja	
1982	Krishnarjunulu		
1982	Prema Moortulu		
1982	Korukunna Mogudu	Sankar Rao and Murali	Double Role
1982	Prathikaram	Commissioner Kamal Nath and Advocate Srinath	Double Role
1982	Swayamvaram	Shekhar	
1982	Devatha	Rambabu	
1982	Illaali Korikalu		
1982	Bandhalu Anubandhalu		
1983	Balidaanam		
1983	Raghu Raamudu		
1983	Mundadugu	Chakravarthi	
1983	Mugguru Monagaallu		
1983	Todu Needaa		
1983	Raja Kumar		
1984	Iddaru Dongalu		
1984	Bava Maradallu		
1984	Punyam Koddi Purushudu	Kishore Babu	
1984	Jagan	Sobhan and Jagan	Double role
1984	Kode Trachu	Gopal and Tiger	Double role
1984	Dandayatra	Srihari	
1984	Illalu Priyuralu		
1984	Mister Vijay		
1984	Abhimanyudu		
1984	Bhaaryaamani		
1984	Daanavudu	Raja	
1984	Sampoorna Premayanam	Venu	
1985	Mahaa Sangramam		
1985	Kongumudi	Chandrasekhar	
1985	Mangalya Balam		
1985	Jackie		
1985	Devaalayam		
1985	Ooriki Soggadu	Balaraju	
1985	Maharaju		
1985	Mugguru Mitrulu		
1985	Srivaru	Balasubrahmanyam	
1986	Sravana Sandhya	Prabhakar	
1986	Driver Babu	Raja aka Driver Babu	
1986	Mister Bharat		
1986	Jeevana Poratam	Bharath	
1986	Jeevana Raagam		
1986	Bandham		
1986	Dharmapeetam Daddarillindhi	Shankar Rao	
1986	Vijrumbhana	Satyam and Arun	Father & Son Double Role
1986	Adavi Raja	Raja	
1986	Sakkanodu	Gopanna	
1986	Jailu Pakshi	S.I. Prathap	
1987	Punnami Chandrudu		
1987	Trimurtulu		Cameo
1987	Ummadi Mogudu		
1987	Kalyaana Taamboolam		
1987	Kartheeka Pournami		
1987	Punya Dampatulu		
1988	Samsaaram	Raja Sekharam	
1988	Donga Pelli		
1988	Doragaarintlo Dongodu		
1988	Chattamto Chadarangam		
1988	Bharya Bhartalu	Ramakrishna	
1988	Anna Chellelu	Dr. Madhav	
1989	Dorikithe Dongalu	Raja and Inspector Rambabu	Double Role
1989	Soggadi Kaapuram	Venugopal	
1990	Doshi Nirdoshi		
1991	Sarpayagam	Dr. Venu Gopal	
1991	Agni Nakshatram		
1992	Balarama Krishnulu	Balaramaiah	
1992	Aswamedham	Abhimanyu IPS	
1993	Evandi Aavida Vachindi	Ramakrishnayya	
1994	Jeevita Khaidi	Sriram	
1995	Aasthi Mooredu Aasha Baaredu		
1995	Dorababu		
1995	Adavi Dora		
1996	Hello Guru	Suryaprakash	
