= Aa Gale Lag Jaa =

Aa Gale Lag Jaa (lit. 'Hug Me') may refer to:

- Aa Gale Lag Jaa (1973 film), a 1973 Hindi romantic film directed by Manmohan Desai
- Aa Gale Lag Jaa (1994 film), a 1994 Hindi film directed by Hamid Ali Khan
- Aa Gale Lag Jaa (TV series), a 2002 Indian TV series
