= K. Bapayya =

Indian film director

- Born: Kovelamudi Bapayya; Hyderabad, India
- Occupation: Film director
- Spouse: K. Bharathi
- Children: Padma, Chamundeswari
- Relatives: K. S. Prakash Rao (uncle); G. Varalakshmi (aunt); K. Raghavendra Rao (first-cousin)

Kovelamudi Bapayya, known as K. Bapayya, is an Indian film director. He has directed about 80 films in Telugu and Hindi languages. He is the cousin of noted director K. Raghavendra Rao and nephew of director and producer K. S. Prakash Rao.

== Early life ==
Kovelamudi Bapayya was born in Hyderabad. He lost both his parents at a very young age, and was raised by his paternal uncle K. S. Prakash Rao, who was a popular filmmaker. He is a first cousin of K. Raghavendra Rao, also a filmmaker. He also has two daughters, Padma and Chamundeswari. Bapayya studied in Vijayawada and Chennai.

== Career ==
Bapayya began his film career by working under K. B. Tilak as an apprentice for the films Muddu Bidda (1956), M. L. A. (1957), and Attaa Okinti Kodale (1958). He then worked for Suresh Productions with Tapi Chanakya for the production's debut film Ramudu Bheemudu in 1964.

Bapayya made his directorial debut in the Tollywood film industry with the feature film Drohi in 1970. He was given the offer to direct the film by producer D. Rama Naidu. The film had Vanisri and Kongara Jaggaya playing the lead characters. The film that truly earned Bapayya name and fame in the Telugu film industry was the drama feature film Soggadu (1975). The Telugu film hit the silver screens on 19 December 1975 and was released again on 1 January 1976. It starred Sobhan Babu, Jayachitra and Jayasudha In the lead roles. The movie won two Filmfare awards. The drama film ran in 17 cinema halls in the then united Andhra Pradesh for one hundred days.

Bapayya made his directorial debut in the Bollywood film industry with the Hindi movie Dildaar (1977). Dildaar was a remake of Bapayya's Soggadu. The Bollywood film hit the big screens on 13 April 1977. It starred Jeetendra, Rekha and Nazneen in lead roles. Bapayya remained active in the film industry till the mid 1990s. Towards the end of his career, Bapayya started focusing on making Bollywood films. One of his blockbusters from the 1990s was Pyar Hua Chori Chori (1991). The romance film hit the theatre halls on 7 June 1991. The film starred Mithun Chakraborty, Gautami, Shikha Swaroop, Shafi Inamdaari, Shakti Kapoor and Anupam Kher. It was Gautami's Hindi debut and a remake of the Malayalam flick Chithram.

He also directed Parda Hai Parda (1992) which is remembered as Chunkey Pandey's solo hit and South Indian actress Meena's debut in the Bollywood film industry. The movie hit the screens on 10 July 1992. Bapayya was known to collaborate with Jeetendra and Mithun Chakraborty in the Bollywood industry.

== Filmography ==
Film performances
Year	Title	Language	Cast	Notes
1970	Drohi	Telugu	Krishnam Raju, Jaggayya, Vanisree	
1973	Memu Manushulame	Telugu	Krishnam Raju, Jamuna	
1974	Urvasi	Telugu	Sanjeev Kumar, Sarada	
1975	Eduruleni Manishi	Telugu	N.T. Rama Rao, Vanisree	Remake of Johny Mera Naam
1975	Soggadu	Telugu	Sobhan Babu, Jayachitra, Jayasudha	
1975	Vykunthapaali	Telugu	Ranganath, Sarada	
1976	Mire ata Choodandi	Telugu		
1977	Dildaar	Hindi	Jeetendra, Rekha	Remake of Soggadu
1977	Gadasu Pillodu	Telugu	Sobhan Babu, Jayasudha	
1977	Indradhanusu	Telugu	Krishna, Sharada	
1978	Dil Aur Deewaar	Hindi	Jeetendra, Moushumi Chatterjee, Rakesh Roshan	Remake of Jeevana Tarangalu
1978	Sahasavantudu	Telugu	N.T. Rama Rao, Vanisree	
1978	Yuga Purushudu	Telugu	N.T. Rama Rao, Jaya Prada	
1979	Mande Gundelu	Telugu	Krishna, Sobhan Babu, Jaya Prada, Jayasudha	
1980	Takkar	Hindi	Sanjeev Kumar, Jeetendra, Vinod Mehra, Zeenat Aman, Jaya Prada, Bindiya Goswami	Remake of Devudu Chesina Manushulu
1980	Bandish	Hindi	Rajesh Khanna, Hema Malini	Remake of Chilipikrishnudu
1981	Aggi Ravva	Telugu	N.T. Rama Rao, Sridevi	
1981	Agni Poolu	Telugu	Krishnam Raju, Jaya Prada, Jayasudha	
1981	Guru Sishyulu	Telugu	ANR, Krishna, Sridevi, Sujatha	
1982	Kaliyuga Ramudu	Telugu	N.T. Rama Rao, Rati Agnihotri	
1982	Naa Desam	Telugu	N.T. Rama Rao, Jayasudha	Remake of Laawaris
1982	Nivuru Gappina Nippu	Telugu	Krishna, Jaya Prada	
1982	Sindoor Bane Jwala	Hindi	Sanjeev Kumar, Sharada	
1983	Mawaali	Hindi	Jeetendra, Sridevi, Jaya Prada	Remake of Chuthallunarru Jagartha
1983	Mundadugu	Telugu	Sobhan Babu, Krishna, Jaya Prada, Sridevi	
1984	Daanavudu	Telugu	Sobhan Babu, Jayasudha	
1984	Dandayatra	Telugu	Sobhan Babu, Jayasudha	
1984	Ghar Ek Mandir	Hindi	Mithun Chakraborty, Ranjeeta	Remake of Bommarillu
1984	Maqsad	Hindi	Jeetendra, Rajesh Khanna, Sridevi, Jaya Prada	Remake of Mundadugu
1984	Inti Guttu	Telugu	Chiranjeevi, Nalini	
1984	Seethamma Pelli	Telugu	Mohan Babu	Remake of Mullum Malarum
1985	Aaj Ka Daur	Hindi	Jackie Shroff, Padmini Kolhapure	
1985	Pataal Bhairavi	Hindi	Jeetendra, Jaya Prada	Remake of Patala Bhairavi (1951)
1985	Chattamtho Poratam	Telugu	Chiranjeevi, Madhavi, Sumalatha	
1986	Jayam Manade	Telugu	Krishna, Sridevi	
1986	Aag Aur Shola	Hindi	Jeetendra, Sridevi, Mandakini	
1986	Ghar Sansar	Hindi	Jeetendra, Sridevi	
1986	Muddat	Hindi	Mithun Chakraborty, Jaya Prada, Padmini Kolhapure	
1986	Swarag Se Sunder	Hindi	Jeetendra, Jaya Prada, Mithun Chakraborty, Padmini Kolhapure	
1987	Majaal	Hindi	Jeetendra, Sridevi, Jaya Prada,	
1987	Himmat Aur Mehanat	Hindi	Jeetendra, Sridevi, Poonam Dhillon	
1987	Mard Ki Zabaan	Hindi	Dharmendra, Jackie Shroff, Poonam Dhillon, Kimi Katkar	
1987	Makutamleni Maharaju	Telugu	Krishna, Sridevi	
1987	Maa Voori Magadu	Telugu	Krishna, Sridevi	
1988	Pyar Ka Mandir	Hindi	Mithun Chakraborty, Madhavi	
1988	Charnon Ki Saugandh	Hindi	Mithun Chakraborty, Amrita Singh	
1988	Waqt Ki Awaz	Hindi	Mithun Chakraborty, Sridevi	
1988	Sone Pe Suhaaga	Hindi	Dharmendra, Jeetendra, Anil Kapoor, Poonam Dhillon, Sridevi, Kimi Katkar	
1989	Sikka	Hindi	Dharmendra, Moushumi Chatterjee, Jackie Shroff, Dimple Kapadia	
1990	Izzatdaar	Hindi	Dilip Kumar, Govinda, Madhuri Dixit	
1990	Pyar Ka Karz	Hindi	Mithun Chakraborty	
1991	Pyar Hua Chori Chori	Hindi	Mithun Chakraborty, Gautami	Remake of Malayalam film Chithram
1991	Pyar Ka Devta	Hindi	Mithun Chakraborty, Madhuri Dixit	
1992	Kasak	Hindi	Rishi Kapoor, Chunky Pandey, Neelam	Remake of Mouna Ragam
1992	Parda Hai Parda	Hindi	Chunky Pandey	Remake of Malayalam film In Harihar Nagar
1995	Diya Aur Toofan	Hindi	Mithun Chakraborty	
