= Makutamleni Maharaju =

- Theatrical release poster
- Directed by: K. Bapayya
- Written by: Paruchuri Brothers (story / dialogues)
- Screenplay by: K. Bapayya
- Produced by: B. V. S. N. Prasad
- Starring: Krishna; Sridevi; Rajendra Prasad; Chandra Mohan
- Cinematography: A. Venkat
- Edited by: Kotagiri Venkateswara Rao
- Music by: Chakravarthy
- Production company: Sri Krishna Prasanna Pictures
- Release date: 13 March 1987
- Running time: 150 minutes
- Country: India
- Language: Telugu

Makutamleni Maharaju (transl. Emperor Without a Crown) is a 1987 Telugu-language action drama film directed by K. Bapayya. Produced by B. V. S. N. Prasad, the film stars Krishna, Sridevi, Rajendra Prasad, and Chandra Mohan with music composed by Chakravarthy. The film was remade in Hindi as Amiri Garibi (1990).

== Plot ==
The film follows Pardhasaradhi, a justice-seeking ruffian revered by the destitute but feared by local gangsters JB, Kondandapani, and Robert, who wreak havoc in the town. Sivaram Prasad, a wealthy businessman, struggles with his disjointed family, including his wife Rajyalakshmi, son Mohan, and daughters Rekha and Rani. Mohan, under the influence of JB, is focused on usurping his father's wealth. Frustrated, Sivaram seeks the help of his childhood friend Raghavayya, Pardhasaradhi's estranged father.

Raghavayya lives with his wife Janaki and daughter Sumathi. Impressed by Sumathi's virtuous nature, Sivaram arranges her marriage to Mohan despite objections from his family. Pardhasaradhi secretly attends the event, where he encounters Saroja, a graceful dancer who is overjoyed to see him due to her deep affection for him. Saroja, a member of a courtesan family known for their integrity, has a manipulative brother-in-law, Joga Rao, who seeks to exploit her for financial gain. Previously, Pardhasaradhi had protected Saroja from JB's advances, earning her admiration and love.

Sumathi moves into her in-laws' house, where she faces Mohan's hostility and the mistreatment of Rajyalakshmi and her daughters. Meanwhile, Mohan becomes infatuated with Saroja and attempts to exploit her, but she firmly resists his advances. At the same time, Ganapati, a close friend of Pardhasaradhi, arrives in the city in search of work and finds shelter with him. Ganapati learns that he had been married to Sivaram's daughter Rekha in childhood, though the marriage was annulled. Determined to reconcile with Rekha, he embarks on a mission to win her back, leading to a series of humorous incidents.

Ganapati soon becomes aware of Sumathi's suffering and informs Pardhasaradhi. Initially misunderstanding Saroja's intentions, Pardhasaradhi later realizes her innocence and, to protect her from Mohan, marries her. Ganapati eventually reconciles with Rekha, who agrees to return with him. The family is thrown into further turmoil when Sivaram passes away, leaving all his wealth to Sumathi, intensifying the tensions within the household.

Pardhasaradhi remains vigilant against JB and his gang, thwarting their repeated attacks. Intrigued by his anger and relentless fight for justice, Saroja inquires about his past, leading him to reveal his struggles. At one point, Pardhasaradhi donates ancestral temple jewelry to fund a poor girl’s marriage, but Raghavayya reports him to the authorities, resulting in his arrest. After his release, Pardhasaradhi reflects on the social injustices that turned him into a ruffian. Believing it is safer for Saroja, he asks her to leave and live with her in-laws.

JB devises a plan to kidnap Saroja, using Joga Rao as bait, and frames Pardhasaradhi for Joga Rao’s murder. Pardhasaradhi is sentenced to life imprisonment, which devastates his mother, Janaki, who dies in grief. Meanwhile, Mohan exploits Sumathi’s vulnerable state, forcing her to sign over the property and divorce papers before expelling her from the house.

Pardhasaradhi escapes from prison after Raghavayya seeks his help, revealing the dire situation at home. He returns to confront JB and his gang. Mohan, manipulated by JB, continues to mistreat Sumathi, inciting a rebellion against his oppressors. JB plots to kill Pardhasaradhi by orchestrating Mohan’s remarriage and using Saroja as leverage. However, Saroja's former suitor, coerced by JB, turns against the gang, exposing their deceit and aiding Pardhasaradhi.

In the end, Pardhasaradhi reforms Mohan, defeats JB and his gang, and surrenders to the authorities. After serving a short sentence, Pardhasaradhi reunites with his family, bringing the story to a joyful conclusion.

== Cast ==
- Krishna as Pardhasaradhi
- Sridevi as Saroja
- Rajendra Prasad as Mohan
- Rao Gopal Rao as Raghavayya
- Gummadi as Sivaram Prasad
- Nutan Prasad as J. B.
- Chalapathi Rao as Robert
- Paruchuri Venkateswara Rao as Kodandapaani
- Chandra Mohan as Ganapati
- Rallapalli as Tukaram
- Narra Venkateswara Rao as Dasu
- Devadas Kanakala as Joga Rao
- Malladi as Ramadasu Master
- Jaya Bhaskar as Lawyer
- C. H. Krishna Murthy as Rangadu
- Telephone Satyanarayana as Jailor Siva Prasad
- Gadiraju Subba Rao as Narasimhulu
- Chidatala Appa Rao as Bus Conductor
- Satti Babu as Priest
- Annapurna as Janaki
- Mucherla Aruna as Rekha
- Poornima as Sumathi
- K. Vijaya as Saroja's sister
- Chandrika as Rani
- Y. Vijaya as Rajyalakshmi
- Nirmalamma as Kanthamma

== Music ==
Makutamleni Maharaju

Film score by Chakravarthy
- Released: 1987
- Genre: Soundtrack
- Length: 24:57
- Label: LEO Audio
- Producer: Chakravarthy

Chakravarthy chronology
Marana Homam (1987)	Makutamleni Maharaju (1987)	Maa Voori Magadu (1987)

Music for the film was composed by Chakravarthy. Lyrics were written by Veturi. Audio soundtrack was released on Leo music label.

S. No.	Song title	Singers	length
1	"Maa Kanti Jabilli"	Raj Seetharam, P. Suseela	4:05
2	"Adagandhe Ammaina"	Raj Seetharam, S. Janaki	4:10
3	"Chittadi Chittadi"	Raj Seetharam, P. Suseela	4:12
4	"Hey Hey Hero"	Raj Seetharam, S. Janaki	4:01
5	"Naina Nandhi"	Raj Seetharam, P. Suseela	4:14
6	"Arjuna Falguna"	P. Susheela	4:15
