= Soggadu =

Soggadu (lit. 'infected') may refer to:

- Soggadu (1975 film), a 1975 Indian Telugu-language film directed by K. Bapayya
- Soggadu (2005 film), a 2005 Indian Telugu-language film directed by Ravi Babu

== See also ==
- Soggade Chinni Nayana, a 2016 Indian Telugu-language film directed by Kalyan Krishna Kurasala
