= Tahsildar Gari Ammayi =

- Theatrical release poster
- Directed by: K. S. Prakash Rao
- Screenplay by: K. S. Prakash Rao
- Based on: Vidhi Vinyaasaalu by Kavilipati Vijayalakshmi
- Produced by: Suryanarayana; Sathyanarayana
- Starring: Sobhan Babu; Nagabhushanam; Jamuna
- Cinematography: S. Venkatarathnam
- Music by: K. V. Mahadevan
- Production company: Sathya Chitra
- Release date: 12 November 1971
- Country: India
- Language: Telugu

Tahsildar Gari Ammayi (transl. The Tehsildar's daughter) is a 1971 Indian Telugu-language drama film directed by K. S. Prakash Rao. It is an adaptation of Kavilipati Vijayalakshmi's novel Vidhi Vinyaasaalu that was serialised the same year in the newspaper Andhra Prabha. The film stars Sobhan Babu, Nagabhushanam and Jamuna. It was released on 12 November 1971, and became a commercial success.

== Plot ==
The story follows a young bus conductor (Sobhan Babu) who is romantically pursued by the daughter of a Tahsildar (Jamuna). Despite familial opposition, the couple marries due to the persistence of the young woman. However, tensions arise as her uncles and other family members attempt to separate the newlyweds. They instill doubt in the wife’s mind by showing her a scene of her husband watching a movie with another woman, leading to misunderstandings and conflict between the couple.

Believing that poverty is linked to a lack of manners, the wife asserts that her status as the daughter of a Tahsildar guarantees her wisdom. She insists on raising their son separately, causing further rifts. The husband, his pride wounded, vows to make their son a collector, proving his capability. This determination leads to their separation.

In the end, the husband achieves his goal, and their son becomes a collector. Upon learning that his parents parted over a trivial misunderstanding, the son takes it upon himself to reunite them. His efforts succeed, and the family reconciles, bringing the story to a heartwarming conclusion.

== Cast ==
- Sobhan Babu as Prasada Rao and Vasu
  - Master Rajkumar as young Vasu
- Nagabhushanam as Venkataramayya
- Jamuna as Madhumathi
- Chandrakala as Padmaja
- Raavi Kondala Rao as Rajasekharam
- Sakshi Ranga Rao as Gopalam

== Production ==
Vidhi Vinyaasaalu was a novel written by Kavilipati Vijayalakshmi and serialised in 1971 in the newspaper Andhra Prabha. Suryanarayana and Sathyanarayana of Sathya Chitra purchased the film rights to this novel, and engaged K. S. Prakash Rao to direct the adaptation, titled Tahsildar Gari Ammayi. Prakash Rao also wrote the screenplay, while N. R. Nandi wrote the dialogues, and S. Venkatarathnam handled the cinematography. Prakash Rao's son K. Raghavendra Rao and G. C. Sekhar were associate directors, while his niece Mohana was the art director.

== Soundtrack ==
The soundtrack was composed by K. V. Mahadevan, while Aatreya wrote the lyrics.

No.	Title	Singer(s)	Length
1.	"Chaka Chaka Ladey"	Ghantasala, P. Susheela	3:45
2.	"Jajiri Jajiri Bava"	P. Susheela	4:19
3.	"Kanabadani Cheyedhu"	Mohanraju	3:00
Total length:			11:04

== Release and reception ==
Tahsildar Gari Ammayi was released on 12 November 1971, and became a commercial success, running for over 100 days in theatres. For his performance, Sobhan Babu won the Andhra Film Fans Association Award for Best Actor. Akkineni Nageswara Rao, who presented him the award, said, "He is a good actor. He is the future hope of the film industry."
