= Dildaar =

- Theatrical release poster
- Directed by: K. Bapayya
- Written by: Inder Raj Anand (dialogues)
- Story by: Balamurugan
- Based on: Soggadu (1975) by K. Bapayya
- Produced by: D. Rama Naidu
- Starring: Jeetendra; Rekha; Nazneen
- Cinematography: P. N. Sundaram
- Edited by: K. A. Marthand
- Music by: Laxmikant-Pyarelal
- Production company: Suresh Productions
- Release date: 13 April 1977
- Running time: 156 minutes
- Country: India
- Language: Hindi

Dildaar (transl. Sweetheart) is a 1977 Indian Hindi-language action film, produced by D. Rama Naidu under Suresh Productions and directed by K. Bapayya. It stars Jeetendra, Rekha, Nazneen and music composed by Laxmikant Pyarelal. The film is a remake of the Telugu film Soggadu (1975) starring Sobhan Babu, Jayachitra, Jayasudha. Both the movies were made under the same banner and the director. The film was Above Average at the box office. Actress Nazneen received the film's only Filmfare nomination for Best Supporting Actress.

== Plot ==
The film begins in a village where Banke C. Lal, a farmer, receives Krishi Pandit award for green revolution. He lives with his mother Lakshmi. He falls for Parvati, the daughter of the village-head Charandas. A zamindar, Sangram Singh is an associate of Charandas and together they are engaged in criminal activities. Latha is the original heir of the zamindari Sangram Singh claims as his own. She is timid and has a phobia for owls. Sangram Singh exploits her phobia and tries to get her declared legally insane. Meanwhile, Banke asks Charandas for Parvati's hand in marriage. Charandas rejects him by calling him an illiterate person not fit for his daughter. Banke is angered and vows that he will marry a girl who comes from a rich and educated background, who will be even better than Parvati. Latha tries to escape the clutches of Sangram Singh with the help of Prasad but he tries to swindle her. She is rescued by Banke. Due to certain circumstances, they decide to marry. Sangram Singh tries to separate them. Meanwhile, Banke's mother does not approve of his marriage to Latha as Sangram Singh was responsible for the death of her husband Chotelal. Despite these issues, Banke succeeds in establishing that Latha is not insane and is a normal person. Sangram Singh becomes desperate and tries to kill Latha, but Parvati comes between them and sacrifices her life to save Latha. Banke defeats Sangram Singh and the movie ends happily for him and Latha.

== Cast ==
- Jeetendra as Bankelal
- Rekha as Lata
- Nazneen as Parvati "Paro"
- Prem Chopra as Sangram Singh
- Jeevan as Sarpanch Charandas
- Shashikala as Sangram's elder sister
- Sujit Kumar as Chotelal
- Deven Verma as Salim
- Raza Murad as Psychiatrist
- Urmila Bhatt as Laxmi
- Jagdeep as Saudagarmal
- Roopesh Kumar as Prasad
- Birbal as Postman
- Keshto Mukherjee as Raju
- Meena T. as Phoolrani
- Sheetal as Savitri

== Soundtrack ==
Song	Singer
"Sakool Mein Kya Padhoge, Ho Ram, Dil Ki Kitaab Pad Lo"	Kishore Kumar
"Main Raja, Tu Rani, Tu Raja, Main Rani"	Kishore Kumar, Asha Bhosle
"Teri Meri Shadi Seedi Saadi"	Kishore Kumar, Asha Bhosle
"Dekha Na Kaise Dara Diya, Jiya Dhadka Diya"	Kishore Kumar, Asha Bhosle
"Hum Jaise To Dildaar Hote Hain"	Kishore Kumar, Asha Bhosle
"Hum Jaise To Dildaar Hote Hain (With Dialogue)"	Kishore Kumar, Asha Bhosle
