= Mathru Devata =

- Theatrical release poster
- Directed by: Savitri
- Written by: Maddipatla Suri (dialogues)
- Screenplay by: K. Pratyagatma
- Produced by: Atluri Purnachandra Rao; M. Chandra Sekhar
- Starring: N. T. Rama Rao; Savitri; Sobhan Babu
- Cinematography: Shekar-Singh
- Edited by: M.S.N.Murthy; A. Dandapaani
- Music by: K. V. Mahadevan
- Production company: Poorna Art Pictures
- Release date: 7 November 1969
- Running time: 154 Mins
- Country: India
- Language: Telugu

Mathru Devata (transl. A goddess called mother) is a 1969 Telugu-language drama film directed by Savitri. The film stars N. T. Rama Rao, Savitri, Sobhan Babu, with music composed by K. V. Mahadevan. It was produced by Atluri Purnachandra Rao and M. Chandra Sekhar under the Poorna Art Pictures banner.

== Plot ==
The film opens with Engineer Srinivasa Rao leading a delightful life with his wife, Lakshmi; his mother, Santhamma; and his daughter, Latha. While his office staff admire him, Sivayya, a colleague, harbours jealousy. Sivayya conspires with his lover, Gauri, to kill Srinivasa Rao. However, Srinivasa Rao survives a staged train accident that is believed to have claimed his life, leading to the despair and departure of his family. Srinivasa Rao, discovering Gauri’s treachery, returns to confront her but is forced to flee when Gauri accidentally dies.

Srinivasa Rao is subsequently captured by the scheming Mohan. Meanwhile, Lakshmi, Santhamma, and Latha reside in a colony where they are cared for by the kind-hearted constable Dharmayya, though they face hostility from the cunning merchant Seshavataram. Years later, Latha falls in love with Raja, Dharmayya's son, who is a police officer. Lakshmi loses her job, prompting Latha to support the family through dance performances. Mohan, who has become infatuated with Latha, attempts to assault her, but Srinivasa Rao intervenes and safely returns her home, where he requests her to keep his return a secret.

Seshavataram exploits this situation, spreading false rumors that tarnish Lakshmi’s reputation, particularly when she becomes pregnant. Dharmayya and Raja become suspicious of her fidelity. However, Santhamma reveals the truth to Dharmayya. Seshavataram incites public outrage against Lakshmi, but Srinivasa Rao eventually reappears and reveals his identity. Raja apprehends Srinivasa Rao, but Dharmayya uncovers that Gauri is alive and that Mohan was the real antagonist.

The film concludes on a positive note with the marriage of Raja and Latha, bringing resolution to the family's struggles.

== Cast ==
- N. T. Rama Rao as Srinivasa Rao
- Savitri as Lakshmi
- Shobhan Babu as Raja
- Relangi as Seshavataram
- Nagabhushanam as Dharmayya
- Prabhakar Reddy as Ram Mohan
- Raja Babu as Devayya
- Jagga Rao as Sivayya
- Chandrakala as Latha
- Vijaya Lalitha as Dancer
- Hemalatha as Santhamma
- Surabhi Balasaraswathi as Gowri
- P. R. Varalakshmi
- Baby Rani
- Master Visweswara Rao

== Music ==
Mathru Devata

Film score by K. V. Mahadevan
- Released: 1969
- Genre: Soundtrack
- Producer: K. V. Mahadevan

K. V. Mahadevan chronology
Bhale Rangadu (1969)	Mathru Devata (1969)	Ekaveera (1969)

The music was composed by K. V. Mahadevan.

S. No.	Song title	Lyrics	Singers	length
1	"Manase Kovelaga"	Dasaradhi	P. Susheela	3:55
2	"My Name is Rosy"	C. Narayana Reddy	L. R. Eswari	4:10
3	"Maanava Jathi Manugadake"	C. Narayana Reddy	P. Susheela, Vasantha	4:38
4	"Vidhi Oka Vishavalayam"	C. Narayana Reddy	Ghantasala	3:51
5	"Pellimata Vintene"	C. Narayana Reddy	Ghantasala, Vasantha	3:56
6	"Kanniyanu Udikincha Taguna"	C. Narayana Reddy	P. Susheela	4:04
7	"Manase Kovelaga" (Sad)	Dasaradhi	P. Susheela	3:08
8	"Ninnu Chuchithe"	Kosaraju	Pithapuram, Swarnalatha	3:50
