= Bhale Rangadu =

- Theatrical release poster
- Directed by: T. Rama Rao
- Written by: Gollapudi Maruthi Rao (dialogues)
- Screenplay by: T. Rama Rao
- Story by: Mullapudi Venkata Ramana
- Produced by: N. N. Bhatt
- Starring: Akkineni Nageswara Rao; Vanisri
- Cinematography: K. S. Ramakrishna
- Edited by: J. Krishna Swamy; Balu
- Music by: K. V. Mahadevan
- Production company: Sri Vijaya Bhatt Productions
- Distributed by: Rajasri Films
- Release date: 14 August 1969
- Running time: 138 minutes
- Country: India
- Language: Telugu

Bhale Rangadu is a 1969 Indian Telugu-language drama film, produced by N. N. Bhatt and directed by T. Rama Rao. It stars Akkineni Nageswara Rao, Vanisri and music composed by K. V. Mahadevan. Released on 14 August 1969, the film was a critical and commercial success.

== Cast ==
- Akkineni Nageswara Rao as Ranga
- Vanisri as Radha
- Gummadi as Diwanji
- Satyanarayana as Seshu
- Allu Ramalingaiah as Astrologer
- Dhulipala as Narasaiah
- Nagabhushanam as Zamindar Raja Shekaram
- Padmanabham as Papai
- Raavi Kondala Rao as R. K. Rao
- Sakshi Ranga Rao as Gumastha Rajanna
- K. V. Chalam as Andalamma's son
- Potti Prasad as Subbai
- Bheema Raju as Jaggadu
- Suryakantham as Andalamma
- Vijaya Lalitha as Ganga
- Pushpa Kumari as Lachamma
- Sarathi as Ranga's secretary in the dream sequence

== Soundtrack ==
Bhale Rangadu

Film score by K. V. Mahadevan
- Released: 1969
- Genre: Soundtrack
- Length: 28:39
- Producer: K. V. Mahadevan

K. V. Mahadevan chronology
Adrushtavanthalu (1969)	Bhale Rangadu (1969)	Buddhimantudu (1969)

Music was composed by K. V. Mahadevan.

S. No.	Song title	Lyrics	Singers	length
1	"Ninna Naadhe Repu Naadhe"	Dasaradhi	Ghantasala	3:45
2	"Palukaleni Mouna Geethi"	C.Narayana Reddy	Ghantasala, P. Susheela	4:38
3	"Merisi Poye"	Aarudhra	P. Susheela	4:25
4	"Pagati Kalalu"	Kosaraju	Ghantasala, L. R. Eeswari	4:14
5	"Abbabba Chali"	Kosaraju	Pithapuram, L. R. Eeswari	3:46
6	"Hip Hip Hurray"	Aarudra	Ghantasala, P. Susheela	4:19
7	"Paisa Paisa Paisa"	Aarudhra	Ghantasala	3:32

== Reception ==
Vijaya of Visalaandhra in her review dated 17 August 1969 called Bhale Rangadu an "entertaining film," whilst appreciating the performances of Nageswara Rao and Vanisri.
