= Neethi (1972 film) =

1972 Tamil film by C. V. Rajendran

- Theatrical release poster
- Directed by: C. V. Rajendran
- Story by: Virendra Sinha
- Produced by: K. Balaji
- Starring: Sivaji Ganesan; Jayalalithaa; Sowcar Janaki
- Cinematography: Masthan
- Edited by: B. Kanthasamy
- Music by: M. S. Viswanathan
- Production company: Sujatha Cine Arts
- Release date: 7 December 1972
- Running time: 159 minutes
- Country: India
- Language: Tamil

Neethi (transl. Justice) is a 1972 Indian Tamil-language film produced by K. Balaji and directed by C. V. Rajendran. A remake of the Hindi film Dushmun (1971), it stars Sivaji Ganesan, Jayalalithaa and Sowcar Janaki. The film revolves around a truck driver who is forced to provide for the family of a man he accidentally killed. Neethi was released on 7 December 1972 and became a commercial success.

== Plot ==
Raja is a rash truck driver who often drives intoxicated. One night he stops at a prostitute's house, then awakens late in the morning. He drives his truck at very high speed in thick fog to make up for lost time, drinking once again. He runs over and kills a farmer, but instead of fleeing in a hit and run opportunity, Raja stays to face the consequences. He is arrested by police and brought before the court.

Raja acknowledges his guilt to the judge who knows that he should be sent to prison for two years. Instead, the judge is moved by the plight of the farmer's family which includes his widow Seetha, a sister, two young children, a weak father and a blind mother. They believe that imprisonment serves no good for the victim or the perpetrator. The judge decides to try a novel experiment by forcing Raja to live with the farmer's family and look after their financial needs. Horrified, Raja tries in vain to convince the judge to change his ruling and send him to the regular prison. Raja is transported to his new "prison" under police protection, where he must meet the hostile villagers. The farmer's family abhors his presence and call him a murderer. Raja tries to escape from the family the first night, but is apprehended and brought back to the house to serve his time.

Raja comes to terms with the twist of fate that has forced him to become a subsistence farmer and live under the unforgiving eyes of the farmer's family. Over time, he started sincerely working for the family and its interests. He meets Radha Jayalalithaa, a happy-go-lucky girl who operates a small bi-scope machine to entertain the village kids. They take an instant liking to each other, which blossoms into love. He also finds friends among the previously hostile villagers Ponnamma. Raja works hard on the family land while protecting it from the clutches of a local landlord R.S.Manohar who has ill-intentioned designs on the land and on the farmer's sister.

Surmounting many obstacles, Raja arranged the marriage of the sister with her childhood sweetheart. With the help of a benevolent police force and the judge, Raja thwarted attempts by the landlord to seize the family's land and that of other villagers who have mortgaged their land with him. The farmer's widow, however, can not forgive Raja for having killed her husband.

Things take a dramatic turn for the worse when Raja is framed and arrested for the accidental death of Radha's drunken grandfather. At the same time, the landlord has the lush harvest produced by Raja and other villagers covertly set ablaze and has Radha kidnapped, primarily to punish Raja. The widow who has been working in the landlord's Ice Factory thinking, he is an honourable man, witnessed the misdeeds of the landlord and finally realised his mistake. She rescues Radha, but is instead trapped by the landlord, who tries to rape her. Meanwhile, Raja stages an escape from his holding cell with the help of Radha, and comes to Seetha's rescue in the nick of time. He confronts the landlord and violently assaults him as payback. The Police show up and arrest the landlord for his role in defrauding the villagers and destroying their harvest.

The deceased farmer's family finally accepted Raja as one of their own and arranged his marriage with Radha. Finally, Raja completed his two years imprisonment successfully. Police arrive to escort him back to town. He asks the judge to let him serve a life sentence, and the judge smiles, justifying that his experiment has been successful. In the end, villagers welcome Raja and celebrate him. The children and the dog reunite with Raja. The family members of the deceased farmer and Ponnamma are reunited. Furthermore, Radha and Raja are united.

== Cast ==
- Sivaji Ganesan as Raja
- Jayalalithaa as Radha
- Sowcar Janaki as Seetha
- K. Balaji as Inspector Sankar
- Major Sundarrajan as Advocate Chakravarthi
- S. V. Subbaiah as Velu
- Gandhimathi as Maragatham
- R. S. Manohar as Nagalingam
- M. R. R. Vasu as Nallakannu
- J. P. Chandrababu as Eattu Kannaiya
- Manorama as Ponnamma
- V. Nagayya as High Court Judge
- T. K. Balachandran as Ragu
- Jaya Kowsalya as Kamala
- Baby Indira as Sumathi
- Mukkamala as Maruthappan
- C. I. D. Sakunthala as Record Rani
- K. Kannan as Moiner
- Usilai Mani as Chettiyar
- Rama Rao as Iyer
- I.S.R as Lorry Cleaner

== Production ==
During filming, Manorama was ill with fever one day, but voluntarily took part in filming that day to avoid production delays, despite Ganesan asking to postpone the shoot.

== Soundtrack ==
The soundtrack was composed by M. S. Viswanathan, with lyrics by Kannadasan.

Title	Singer(s)
"Engaladhu Bhoomi"	T. M. Soundararajan, P. Susheela, Kovai Soundararajan, Veeramani, J. P. Chandrababu & Manorama
"Naalai Mudhal Kudikka"	T. M. Soundararajan
"Mappilaiya Paathukkadi Maina"	T. M. Soundararajan
"Odudhu Paar"	P. Susheela
"Kalyanathula Melam"	P. Susheela

== Release and reception ==
Neethi was released on 7 December 1972, and became a commercial success. Kumudam positively reviewed the film, especially for the cast performances. Kanthan of Kalki also praised the cast performances and Rajendran's direction, but criticised the film for being a near shot-for-shot remake of Dushmun.
