= Jailu Pakshi =

1986 Telugu film directed by Kodi Ramakrishna

- Directed by: Kodi Ramakrishna
- Written by: Paruchuri Brothers (dialogues)
- Produced by: S. Sashi Bhushan
- Starring: Sobhan Babu; Radhika Sarathkumar; Sumalatha
- Cinematography: S. Gopal Reddy
- Music by: K. V. Mahadevan
- Production company: Sri Sarathi Studios
- Release date: 13 December 1986
- Country: India
- Language: Telugu

Jailu Pakshi (transl. Prison Bird) is a 1986 Indian Telugu-language film directed by Kodi Ramakrishna, produced by S. Sashi Bhushan in the banner of Sri Sarathi Studios. The film has musical score by K. V. Mahadevan. It was released on 13 December 1986 to positive reviews and emerged as a commercial success. The film was remade in Tamil with Vijayakanth as Sirai Paravai (1987).

== Cast ==
- Sobhan Babu as Inspector Rana Prathap
- Radhika Sarathkumar as Durga
- Sumalatha
- Rao Gopala Rao as Chakrapani
- Nutan Prasad as Sambaiah
- Sutti Velu as Rangaiah
- Allu Ramalingaiah as Ganda Bherundam
- Nirmalamma as Rana Prathap's mother
- Baby Shalini as Bhavani
- Sakshi Ranga Rao as Tulasi Ram
- Jaya Malini
- Anuradha
- Vankayla Satyanarayana as Judge
- P.J. Sarma as Public Prosecutor

== Soundtrack ==
Soundtrack composed by K. V. Mahadevan was released through AVM Audio music label. Lyrics were written by C. Narayana Reddy and Sirivennela Seetharama Sastry.

Track list
No.	Title	Lyrics	Singer(s)	Length
1.	"Manasanthaa Premakala"	C. Narayana Reddy	S. P. Balasubrahmanyam, P. Susheela	3:48
2.	"Chevulunna Godalu Levu"	Sirivennela Seetharama Sastry	S. P. Balasubrahmanyam, P. Susheela	4:00
3.	"Ammalagannaayamma"	C. Narayana Reddy	P. Susheela, S. P. Sailaja	3:52
4.	"Neram Chesindevaro"	C. Narayana Reddy	P. Susheela	3:53
5.	"Andagattelendarunnaa"	C. Narayana Reddy	S. P. Balasubrahmanyam, Vani Jayaram & Chorus	4:06
Total length:				19:39
