= Pettandarulu =

- Theatrical release poster
- Directed by: C. S. Rao
- Written by: Tripuraneni Maharadhi (story / dialogues)
- Screenplay by: C. S. Rao
- Produced by: U. Visweswara Rao
- Starring: N. T. Rama Rao; Savitri; Shobhan Babu; Vijaya Nirmala
- Cinematography: G. K. Ramu
- Edited by: R. Hanumantha Rao
- Music by: K. V. Mahadevan
- Production company: Jyothi Cine Syndicate
- Release date: 30 April 1970
- Running time: 142 mins
- Country: India
- Language: Telugu

Pettandarulu (transl. Rulers) is a 1970 Telugu-language revolutionary film, produced by U. Visweswara Rao under the Jyothi Cine Syndicate banner, and directed by C. S. Rao. The film starred N. T. Rama Rao, Savitri, Shobhan Babu, Vijaya Nirmala and music composed by K. V. Mahadevan.

== Cast ==
- N. T. Rama Rao as Chandram
- Savitri as Lakshmi
- Shobhan Babu as Mohan
- Vijaya Nirmala as Dr. Rohini Devi
- V. Nagayya as Bhushaiah
- Nagabhushanam as Jaganatham
- Relangi as Madman / Police Officer
- Satyanarayana as Kotaiah
- Prabhakar Reddy as Suryam
- Dhulipala as Govindaiah
- Mukkamala as Sarpanch Bhuchaiah
- Allu Ramalingaiah as Lakshmipathi
- Raja Babu as Veeranjaneyulu
- Mallikarjuna Rao
- Rao Gopal Rao as Munusabu Achaiah
- Hemalatha as Ranganayakamma
- Rama Prabha as Sarasa
- Vijayalalitha as Nagamani
- Jyothi Lakshmi as item number
- Sadhya Rani as Sarada
- Jhansi as Nirada
- Baby Rani as Raja

== Soundtrack ==
Pettandarulu

Film score by K. V. Mahadevan
- Released: 1970
- Genre: Soundtrack
- Length: 29:07
- Producer: K. V. Mahadevan

K. V. Mahadevan chronology
Akka Chellelu (1970)	Pettandarulu (1970)	Malli Pelli (1970)

The music was composed by K. V. Mahadevan, and was released by Audio Company.

S. No.	Song title	Lyrics	Singers	length
1	"Yekaantha Sevaku"	Vituri	L. R. Eswari	3:57
2	"Naa Desham Kosam"	Kosaraju	Ghantasala	5:15
3	"Maimarpo Tholivalapo"	Aarudhra	P. Susheela	3:30
4	"Maa Padipantalu"	K. Appa Rao	P. Susheela, Raghuram	4:05
5	"Maanavudaa O Maanavudaa"	Sri Sri	Ghantasala	4:26
6	"Daggaragaa Inkaa Daggaragaa"	Dasaradhi	S. P. Balasubrahmanyam, P. Susheela	3:24
7	"Raamakrishnulu Kanna Desam"	Kosaraju	Ghantasala	4:30
