= Maattoly =

- Poster
- Directed by: A. Bhimsingh
- Screenplay by: Balakrishnan
- Story by: Virender Singh
- Starring: M. G. Soman; Sarada; Sukumari; Jayabharathi; Jagannatha Varma
- Cinematography: D. S. Pandyan
- Edited by: K. Sankunni
- Music by: Jaya Vijaya
- Production company: Swapna Films
- Release date: 25 April 1978
- Country: India
- Language: Malayalam

Maattoly is a 1978 Indian Malayalam-language film directed by A. Bhimsingh and starring M. G. Soman, Sharada, Sukumari, Jayabharathi, and Jagannatha Varma. It is a remake of the 1972 Hindi film Dushmun. The last Malayalam film of Bhimsingh, it was released on 25 April 1978, three months after his death.

== Plot ==
Raghu, an alcoholic truck driver, accidentally kills a man while driving. Despite having an opportunity to escape, he decides to surrender. The judge Joseph, instead of sending Raghu to prison, assigns him to support the deceased man's family for two years.

== Cast ==
- Sarada as Malathi
- Sukumari as Kochammini
- Jayabharathi as Radha
- Jagannatha Varma as Judge
- Jalaja as Thankam
- K. P. A. C. Sunny as Joseph
- M. G. Soman as Raghu
- Jagathy Sreekumar as Keshavan
- Jose Prakash as Sekharan
- Philomina as Kalyani
- Nellikode Bhaskaran as Govindan
- Pattom Sadan as Constable Narayana Pilla

== Soundtrack ==
The music was composed by Jaya Vijaya and the lyrics were written by Bichu Thirumala.

Song	Singers
"Aakaasham Swarnam"	S. Janaki, K. P. Brahmanandan, Chorus
"Kallolam Nalla Paaneeyam"	K. J. Yesudas
"Maattuvin Chattangale" (Pallanayaattil)	K. J. Yesudas
"Vannaatte Varivari Ninnaatte"	S. Janaki
