= Natakala Rayudu =

- CD cover of Natakala Rayudu film
- Directed by: A. Sanjeevi
- Written by: Gollapudi Maruthi Rao (dialogue); Aathreya (lyrics)
- Produced by: Diddi Srihari Rao
- Starring: Nagabhushanam; Kanchana; V. Nagayya; Kaikala Satyanarayana
- Cinematography: Kamal Ghosh
- Music by: G. K. Venkatesh
- Release date: 1969
- Country: India
- Language: Telugu

Natakala Rayudu is a 1969 Telugu-language drama film directed by A. Sanjeevi. It is led by the famous character actor Nagabhushanam.

It is based on the 1951 Hindi film Albela starring Bhagwan.

== Plot ==
Adiseshayya (Nagayya) has two sons and a daughter. His younger son Bujjibabu (Nagabhushanam) likes acting very much. Because of this he loses many jobs shown by his father. Finally they have a big quarrel and Bujjibabu is sent out of his home by his father. His mother blesses him to become a big star. He spends a horrible life without food and is forced to be a domestic worker in the house of Geetha Devi (Kanchana). She identifies the actor in him and gives a chance to act in her company. In spite of resistance from Manager Rajasekhar (Padmanabham) and Hero Prem Kumar (Prabhakar Reddy), he grows to a big star. Geetha Devi loves Bujjibabu. But he concentrates on acting mostly and becomes a big star. After becoming a star, he goes home and finds them facing many problems. Finally he solves their problems and marries Geetha Devi.

== Cast ==
Actor / Actress	Character
Nagabhushanam	Bujjibabu, younger son of Adiseshayya
Kanchana	Geetha Devi
V. Nagayya	Adiseshayya
Kaikala Satyanarayana	Rama Rao, elder son of Adiseshayya
Hemalatha	Wife of Adiseshayya
B. Padmanabham	Rajasekhar
M. Prabhakar Reddy	Prem Kumar

== Soundtrack ==
All music is composed by G. K. Venkatesh.

Track listing
No.	Title	Lyrics	Singer(s)	Length
1.	"Idena Neneduru Choochina Prajaswamyam"	Acharya Aatreya	Ghantasala, P. Susheela
2.	"O Buchibabu Are O Pichibabu"	Acharya Aatreya	S. P. Balasubrahmanyam
3.	"Chinnavada Vannekada"	Acharya Aatreya	P. Susheela, S. P. Balasubrahmanyam
4.	"Droupadi Pancha Bhartruka"	Vaddadi	Madhavapeddi Satyam
5.	"Nalabhai Ki Debbai Ki Theda Enta"	Acharya Aatreya	Ghantasala, P. B. Srinivas, P. Susheela, B. Vasantha
6.	"Neelala Kannullo Melamellaga Nidura Ravamma (Happy)"	Acharya Aatreya	P. Susheela
7.	"Neelala Kannullo Melamellaga Nidura Ravamma (Sad)"	Acharya Aatreya	P. Susheela
8.	"Pattu Panpuna Vennela"	Vaddadi	Pithapuram Nageswara Rao, P. Susheela
9.	"Rayuda Na Rayuda Natakala Rayuda"	Acharya Aatreya	Pithapuram Nageswara Rao
10.	"Vela Chooda Vennelaye Lona Chooda Vechanaye"	Acharya Aatreya	P. Susheela
