= Andaru Dongale =

1974 film

- Theatrical poster
- Directed by: V. B. Rajendra Prasad
- Produced by: Akkineni Ananda Rao
- Starring: Sobhan Babu; Lakshmi; S. V. Ranga Rao; Nagabhushanam; Kaikala Satyanarayana; Prabhakar Reddy
- Edited by: A. Sanjeevi
- Music by: K. V. Mahadevan
- Release date: 10 May 1974
- Running time: 145 Mins
- Country: India
- Language: Telugu

Andaru Dongale is a 1974 Indian Telugu-language film directed by V. B. Rajendra Prasad. It is a remake of 1972 Bollywood film Victoria No. 203. It is a commercial hit and ran for more than 100 days in 3 centres.

== Credits ==
- Sobhan Babu as Kumar
- Lakshmi as Lakshmi
- S. V. Ranga Rao as Chanti Babu
- Nagabhushanam as Bujji Babu
- Kaikala Satyanarayana as Durga Rao
- Prabhakar Reddy as Gundu
- Rao Gopal Rao as Ranjit
- Mukkamala as Jailer
- Raja Babu as Dhairyam
- Ramana Reddy as Constable
- Tyagaraju as Jaggu
- Y. V. Raju as Dharmaiah
- Venkateswara Rao as Subbaiah
- K. V. Chalam
- Rama Prabha as Gowri
- Jayakumari as Kantha

== Soundtrack ==
- "Chantibabu O Bujjibabu" – Madhavapeddi Satyam, S. P. Balasubrahmanyam
- "Chusanura Ee Vela"
- "Gudugudu Guncham Gunderagam"
- "Gurudeva Mahadeva"
- "Naayudolla Inti Kaada Nallatumma Chettu Kinda"

== Box-office ==
The film ran for more than 100 days in Hyderabad, Vijayawada and Visakhapatnam.
