= India Ahead =

Indian English language news channel

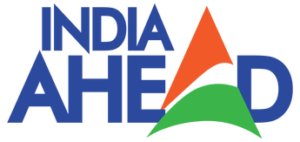
- Country: India
- Broadcast area: Nationally and Worldwide
- Headquarters: Hyderabad, India

Programming
- Language: English
- Picture format: 16:9 (576i, SDTV)

Ownership
- Owner: Andhra Prabha

History
- Launched: July 2018

Links
- Website: https://indiaaheadnow.com/

India Ahead is an English-language news channel in India operated by the Andhra Prabha Media Group. Launched in July 2018, the channel broadcasts current affairs, entertainment, sports, politics, and business content. The channel's headquarters are in Hyderabad, India, with studios located in Delhi. It offers coverage from both Indian and international perspectives.

== History ==
India Ahead was initially led by Chetan Sharma, who served as the CEO and Editorial Director.

== Distribution ==
India Ahead is available on direct-to-home platforms and cable television operators as a free-to-air channel. A mobile app is also available.

== See also ==
- Media in India
- List of news channels in India
- Andhra Prabha
