= Judagadu =

1979 Telugu film starring Sobhan Babu

- Directed by: V. Madhusudhana Rao
- Produced by: Chatterjee
- Starring: Sobhan Babu; Jayasudha
- Music by: Chakravarthy
- Production company: Samatha Films
- Release date: 15 August 1979
- Country: India
- Language: Telugu

Judagadu(transl. Gambler) is a 1979 Indian Telugu action film directed by V. Madhusudhana Rao. The film became a superhit at the box office.

The film stars Sobhan Babu and Jayasudha in the lead roles. The film became popular for the martial arts performance by Sobhan Babu. The film produced by Chatterjee under Samatha Films had his son, Kranthikumar playing Sobhan Babu's younger brother. Chakravarthy scored the film's soundtrack. The song Mallela Velaa Allari became an instant hit upon release and is popular even today.

== Cast ==
- Sobhan Babu as Vijay
- Jayasudha as Aruna
- Anjali Devi
- Jaggayya as DSP Durga Rao
- Gummadi
- Sreedhar as Inspector Sreedhar
- Prabhakar Reddy as Rudrappa
- Giri Babu as Johnny
- Jayamalini
- Nirmalamma
- Thyagaraju
- Narra Venkateswara Rao

== Release ==
The film was released on 15 August 1979. The film ran for 100 days in a few centres across the state. The film had a theatrical run of 78 days in Hyderabad and 58 days in Secunderabad.
