= Chakravakam (1974 Telugu film) =

- Theatrical release poster
- Directed by: V. Madhusudhana Rao
- Written by: Koduri Kausalya Devi (story); Acharya Aatreya (dialogues)
- Produced by: D. Ramanaidu
- Starring: Sobhan Babu; S. V. Ranga Rao; Vanisree
- Music by: K. V. Mahadevan
- Production company: Suresh Productions
- Release date: 1974
- Country: India
- Language: Telugu

Chakravakam (చక్రవాకం) (transl. a rāgam in Carnatic music musical scale in South Indian classical music)

is a 1974 Telugu drama film directed by V. Madhusudhana Rao and produced by D. Ramanaidu on Suresh Productions banner. It starred Sobhan Babu, Vanisri, S. V. Ranga Rao, Chandrakala. The film is based on the novel Chakravakam written by Koduri Kausalya Devi.

== Plot ==
Jagapati (Nagabhushanam )enjoyed a blissful life with his loving family, consisting of three sons. Among them, Kiran(Sobhan Babu) the youngest son, had developed strong feelings for Devarani (Vanisree) who happened to be the daughter of Jagapati's best friend, Dharmarayudu (SV Ranga Rao)

However, Janaki (Rajasulochana), Kiran's sister-in-law, insisted that her father Nageswaraiah (Allu Ramalingaiah) arrange a marriage between Kiran and her sister, Indrani (Chandrakala). In order to prevent floods which devastating the village, a collection of funds was gathered to construct a dam.

Unfortunately, when floods besieged Jagapati's house, Dharmarayudu graciously provided shelter to Jagapati and his entire family. Tragically, the money that had been collected for the dam construction was stolen. To address this dire situation, Dharmarayudu was forced to sell his own house and leave the village. Amidst all this chaos, Jagapati without knowledge of Kiran, displayed no interest in facilitating the marriage between Kiran and Rani, nor did he offer any financial assistance to Dharmarayudu.Indrani, having also left the city and married Diwakar (Sreedhar) who met her during a train journey.

Janaki, harboring resentment towards Kiran for rejecting the alliance with Indrani, resorted to manipulating a photograph of Diwakar and Rani, showing it to Kiran to create a misunderstanding. Eventually, Jagapati discovered that Nageswaraiah had stolen the funds intended for the dam and learned of Janaki's role in the morphed photograph incident. Tragically, Jagapati's wife Kamala (G.Varalakshmi) died due to her son Kiran's absence.

Devastated, Kiran lost his way and became a wanderer, haunted by memories of Rani. Rani, deeply affected by the death of her father Dharmarayudu, withdrew from the world and fell ill with typhoid. Kiran learned of his mother's illness and subsequent passing. When he finally reunited with his father, he discovered that Rani's condition had deteriorated significantly. Finally, on the verge of a comatose state, Kiran encountered Rani. Miraculously, she recovered from her illness and eventually married Kiran, bringing an end to their turbulent journey.

The emergence of cotton sarees marked the entry of Vanisree into Tollywood herself. In this movie, a total of 70 organdy voile sarees were adorned by Vanisree. Each of these sarees was priced below Rs. 200 during that time. With the next movie "Krishnaveni," Vanisree amazed everyone by showcasing approximately 40 exquisite organdy voile sarees.

In the climax scene of the movie, Director. (V.Madhusudhana Rao) had to play a minute role as a boatman named Rayalu. This decision was made because the then assistant director, (Katragadda Murari) who was originally intended to play the boatman, couldn't meet the director's expectations. In a spontaneous move, the director himself decided to transform into the character of Rayalu and quickly put on the boatman's attire to portray the role as required.

== Cast ==
- Sobhan Babu as Kiran
- Vanisree as Devarani
- Chandrakala as Indrani
- S. V. Ranga Rao as Dharma Rayudu
- Anjali Devi
- Nagabhushanam as Jagapati
- G. Varalakshmi
- Allu Ramalingaiah as Nageshwaraiah
- Krishna Kumari
- Rajasulochana as Janaki
- Padmanabham as Sriram
- Sreedhar as Diwakar
- Rajababu
- D. Ramanaidu
- V.Madhusudhana Rao as Rayalu boatman
- K.V. Chalam

== Soundtrack ==
- "Ee Nadila Naa Hrudayam Parugulu Teestundi" (Singers: V. Ramakrishna and P. Susheela)
- "Kothaga Pellaina Kurravaniki Pattapagale Tondara" (Singers: V. Ramakrishna and P. Susheela)
- "Veenaleni Teeganu Neevuleni Bratukunu" (Singers: V. Ramakrishna and P. Susheela)
- "Veenalona Teegalona Ekkadunnadi Ragamu" (Singer: P. Susheela)

== Boxoffice ==
The film ran successfully for 200 days in Hyderabad.
