= Bhaktha Sabari =

1960 film

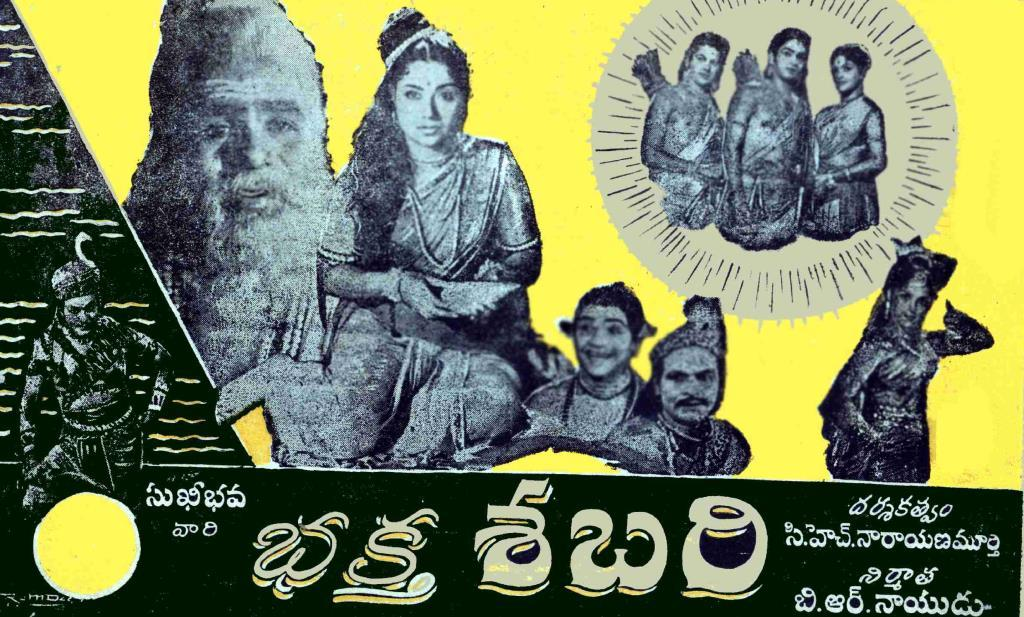
- Theatrical release poster in Telugu
- Directed by: Ch. Narayanamoorthi
- Screenplay by: K. M. Govindarajan
- Produced by: P. R. Naidu & Amasa Subarama Reddy
- Starring: Ashokan; Pandari Bai
- Cinematography: K. V. S. Reddy
- Music by: Pendyala Nageswara Rao
- Production company: Sugibava Productions
- Release date: 28 October 1960
- Country: India
- Languages: Tamil; Telugu; Kannada

Bhaktha Sabari is a 1960 Indian film directed by Ch. Narayanamoorthi based on a screenplay by K. M. Govindarajan. A Tamil-Telugu-Kannada trilingual (with the lattermost version titled as Bhakte Shabari), the film was produced by P. R. Naidu under the banner of Sugibava Productions and A.S.R. Reddy. The film stars Ashokan, Pandari Bai, V. Nagayya, and L. Vijayalakshmi. It features music composed by Pendyala Nageswara Rao, with cinematography by K. V. S. Reddy. The film was supposed to be Sobhan Babu's debut film, but Daiva Balam (1959) was released earlier at the box office.

== Cast ==
| Cast (Tamil) | Cast (Telugu) | Cast (Kannada) | Role |
|---|---|---|---|
| Ashokan | Harinath | Nagesh | Rama |
| Pandari Bai | | | Shabari |

=== Tamil version ===
The list was adapted from the database of Film News Anandan

Male cast

- V. Nagayya
- Ramakrishna
- Nagesh

Female cast

- L. Vijayalakshmi
- T. R. Saroja
- Rajshree (Debut)

=== Telugu version ===
Male cast

- Ramakrishna as Lakshmana
- Sobhan Babu as Karuna
- V. Nagayya
- Chadalavada

Female cast

- Meena Kumari

== Production ==
The film was produced by P. R. Naidu and the production company was Sugibava Productions. Ch. Narayanamoorthi directed the film while K. V. S. Reddy was in charge of the cinematography. The film was produced in Telugu-language with the same title but with a different cast.

== Soundtrack ==
The music was composed by Pendyala Nageswara Rao. Surabhi, Nallathamby and Adhimoolam wrote the lyrics.

| Song | Singer/s | Duration (m:ss) |
|---|---|---|
| "Vaaraai Inre Mohana" | Radha Jayalakshmi | 03:33 |
| "Vaaraai Mana Mohana" | Radha Jayalakshmi | 03:19 |
| "Paada Paada Theyn Paahaai" | P. B. Srinivas | 02:44 |
| "Arunodhayam Pol...Sonnale Ragurama Kathai" | P. B. Srinivas | 03:24 |
| "Yetti Yetti Paakkudu Kannu" | Sirkazhi Govindarajan, K. Jamunarani | 03:16 |
| "Vanna Vadhana Singaari" | Sirkazhi Govindarajan | 03:09 |
| "Vatraadha Jeevanadhi Neeyamma" | Sirkazhi Govindarajan and group | 03:07 |
| "Raamaa Niyaayamaa...Vaadhu Seyyalaamaa" | P. B. Srinivas, P. Susheela | 02:16 |
| "OOrode Vazhanum Naam" | P. B. Srinivas, P. Susheela | 03:17 |
| "Raama Paadhame Gnana Oli" | P. B. Srinivas, P. Susheela | 02:16 |
| "Annal Unnai Kaanumvarai" | P. Susheela | 02:55 |
| "Jaanaki Pin Thodara" | P. Susheela | 03:10 |
