= Narla Venkateswara Rao =

Telugu writer and politician (1908–1985)

Narla Venkateshwara Rao
- Narla Venkateshwara Rao circa 1980

Member of Parliament, Rajya Sabha
- In office 3 April 1958 – 2 April 1970
- Preceded by: T. J. M. Wilson
- Succeeded by: V. B. Raju

Personal details
- Born: 1 December 1908 Jabalpur, Madhya Pradesh
- Died: 13 March 1985 (aged 76)
- Party: Indian National Congress
- Spouse: Sulochana Devi
- Children: 7
- Occupation: Journalist

Narla Venkateshwara Rao (1 December 1908 – 13 March 1985), commonly known as V. R. Narla, was a Telugu writer, journalist, and politician from Andhra Pradesh, India. From 3 April 1958 to 2 April 1970, he served two terms as a member of the Rajya Sabha.

Rao authored a satakam in Telugu, along with numerous other literary works.

== Early life and career ==
Rao was born in Sagar, Madhya Pradesh, on 1 December 1908.

== Career ==
=== Journalism ===
Rao began his journalism career as the editor of Andhra Prabha, which was owned by the Indian Express Group. He wrote a series on Suryadevara Sanjiv Dev from the Tummapudi village in the Guntur district of India.

In 1969, he played a leading role in opposing a bill introduced by Chief Minister Brahmananda Reddy which attempted to restrict freedom of the press by curbing the independence of Andhra Jyothy.

=== Editorial work ===
Rao was profoundly disturbed when the fundamental rights guaranteed by the Indian Constitution were suspended by Prime Minister Indira Gandhi during the Emergency of 1975–1977. In protest, he proposed leaving the editorial column of Andhra Jyothy. However, the newspaper's management overruled his proposal, citing concerns about potential government retaliation and the risk of the newspaper's closure. He later relocated to the United States to spend time with his seven children and their families. After the Emergency ended, he returned to India and resigned from his position as editor of Andhra Jyothy.

Earlier, in the late 1940s, he had attempted to resign from Andhra Prabha in solidarity with journalists protesting Ramnath Goenka's decision to disperse the newspaper’s staff to evade government pay regulations. However, Goenka persuaded him to stay. Rao criticized the Indian National Congress and its approach to politics.

=== Public speaking ===
Narla authored a Telugu play, Seetha Josyam (the prophecy of Seetha), published by the Sahitya Akademi. The play garnered considerable attention in religious as well as literary circles. However, Narla strongly opposed the criticism of the play by the official journal of the Sahitya Akademi, contending that, as the mouthpiece of the publishers, the journal should not engage in criticism of literary works. This stance also underpinned his decision to decline the Sahitya Akademi Award, a move which created a significant impact within academic communities. Narla's monographs on Vemana, V. Veerasalingam, and Gurajada Apparao were translated into several Indian languages.

=== Playwright ===
After resigning from his position as newspaper editor, Narla took to writing plays on serious topics, often incorporating extensive prefaces in a manner similar to George Bernard Shaw's works. One such play, Narakam lo Harischandra (Harischandra in Hell), was dedicated to his longtime friend and journalist Innaiah Narisetti. Another play, based on the mythological story of Draupadi—the shared wife of the five Pandava princes—was originally titled Panchali (wife of five persons). However, Narla was unable to complete his characteristically lengthy preface for this work.

== Award in his name ==
An award, the Narla Venkateshwara Puraskar, was instituted in his name by the B.R. Ambedkar Joshua Phule Periyar Literature Foundation. He participated in many debates in the Indian Parliament.
