= Babu (1975 film) =

1975 film

- Theatrical release poster
- Directed by: K. Raghavendra Rao
- Written by: K. S. Prakash Rao (story); Aatreya (dialogues and lyrics)
- Produced by: A. L. Kumar
- Starring: Shobhan Babu; Vanisri; Lakshmi
- Cinematography: A. Vincent
- Music by: K. Chakravarthy
- Release date: 2 May 1975
- Country: India
- Language: Telugu

Babu is a 1975 Indian Telugu-language drama film written by K. S. Prakash Rao and directed by K. Raghavendra Rao. The film stars Sobhan Babu, Vanisri and Lakshmi in key roles.

The film is a love story between two couples woven with strong family sentiments like objection from elders.

== Cast ==
- Sobhan Babu
- Vanisri
- Lakshmi
- Chandramohan
- Gummadi
- Sukumari
- SVR
- Anjali Devi
- Raja Babu
- Allu Ramalingaiah
- Satyanarayana
- G. Varalakshmi
- Mikkilineni
- Rao Gopal Rao
- E.R.D. Ramulu

== Soundtrack ==
- "Ayyababoy Adiripoyindi" (Singers: S. P. Balasubrahmanyam and P. Susheela)
- "Ennenni Vampulu Ennenni Sompulu Nakunnavemo Rendu Kannulu" (Singers: S. P. Balasubrahmanyam and P. Susheela)
- "Naa Sneham Pandi Premai Nindina Cheliya Ravela" (Lyrics: Aatreya; Singer: S. P. Balasubrahmanyam)
- "Oka Janta Kalisina Tarunana Jeganta Mrogenu Gudilona" (Singers: V. Ramakrishna and P. Susheela)
- "Oyamma Entalesi Siggochindi Siggochi Mogamenta Muddochindi" (Lyrics: Aatreya; Singer: P. Susheela)

== Box office ==
The film ran for more than 50 days in four centers (Hyderabad, Rajahmundry, Visakhapatnam and Vijayawada) in Andhra Pradesh. and was a commercial success.
