= Manushulu Marali =

- Directed by: V. Madhusudhana Rao
- Written by: Thoppil Bhasi
- Starring: Shoban Babu; Sharada; Kanchana; Gummadi; Haranath; Nagabhushanam
- Music by: K. V. Mahadevan
- Production company: Gemini Studios
- Release date: 2 October 1969
- Country: India
- Language: Telugu

Manushulu Marali is a 1969 Indian Telugu-language drama film directed by V. Madhusudhana Rao, starring Sobhan Babu and Sharada. The film was a remake of the Malayalam film Thulabharam (1968).

== Plot ==
The films begins with Vijaya (Sharada) being prosecuted in court. The public prosecutor is Vimala (Kanchana). Vijaya is charged with committing 3 murders and the court allows her a chance to explain her past and the backstory behind the murders.

Vijaya is best friends with Vimala and they attended college together. Vijaya met Seshagiri aka Giri (Haranath) in college and they were in love. Vijaya's father Satyanarayana aka Satyam (Gummadi) is a businessman who runs a factory with Lakshmipati (Nagabhushanam) as his partner. Lakshmipati tries to avoid paying the workers' bonuses by lying to them that they did not make a profit for the year. Satyam is not pleased with his dishonesty and decides to break the partnership and asks for his share of the company back in cash. Lakshmipati sues Satyam in court and also bribes his lawyer Mangalam, who is Vimala's father, to win the case. Mangalam also deceives Satyam and has him sign documents stating that they can take over his properties. Satyam loses his house and all assets and dies from a heart attack.

After Satyam's death, Vijaya is shielded and sheltered by Suryam (Sobhan Babu), one of Satyam's union laborers. Suryam lives in a hut which Vijaya is not used to, and she experiences difficulty but manages it. Vimala and Giri meet her at Suryam's place, where Vimala tells her that her father is not allowing her to stay at her house. She ultimately asks Giri to marry her, but he refuses, indicating that he expressed interest in her only for her money. Without a second thought, Vijaya then proposes to Suryam, and they marry. Vimala expresses her disgust towards her father for his actions.

Suryam and Vijaya live happily but experience the heavy distress of poverty along with the rest of the union laborers. Meanwhile, Lakshmipati continues his atrocities. As a flabbergast, Giri turns up as the general manager of the factory and asserts dominance over the union. He has several encounters with Suryam, and they develop an enmity. Lakshmipati introduces new machinery to the industry and lays off 200 labor workers, including Suryam and his close aides. The union chooses to protest but the government intervenes and takes possession of the factory, making it a federal corporation. However, Lakshmipati gets a stay order from the court and continues. Meanwhile, Vimala frequents Vijaya to offer moral and financial support, but Vijaya turns down any money. Giri and Mangalam's assistant Sarvamangalam come to Suryam's house to try and bribe Suryam and Vijaya, but both of them scorn and repulse them.

One night, Suryam walks out to the union office and Vijaya senses danger. While he is walking alone, a group of men stab and kill him. Without a male head to feed the family, Vijaya tries to look for employment but to no avail. They do not even have food to eat. Eventually, Suryam's sister and brother-in-law take possession of the house and Suryam's mother as well. Vijaya's children walk out in public begging and looking for food, which angers Vijaya. Vijaya then mixed poison in their food, fed it to the kids and ate it herself to commit suicide. However, the three kids died and she survived. These are the three murders she is being charged with in court.

In court, upon hearing Vijaya's story, Vimala wishes to argue the case again. However, the judge rejects it as it is against the law. Vijaya breaks down and faints in court. Vimala rages and breaks down in grief over the events that have happened. Vimala gives up her job and visits Vijaya in prison, assuring her that she can help in any way possible. Vijaya tells her that Vimala made the wrong decision and that she is willing to die, and breathes her last.

== Cast ==
- Sobhan Babu as Suryam
- Sarada as Vijaya
- Haranath as Seshagiri aka Giri
- Kanchana as Vimala
- Gummadi as Satyanarayana aka Satyam
- Nagabhushanam as Lakshmipati
- Raavi Kondala Rao as Lawyer Sarvamangalam
- Nirmalamma as Suryam's mother
- Krishnam Raju

== Soundtrack ==
- "Amma Amma Kanumoosava" (Singer: Ghantasala)
- "Aruna Pathaakam Yegirindhi Karmikalokam Gelichindhi" (7
- "Bhoomatha Eenadu" (Singers: P. Susheela and P. Leela)
- "Cheekatilo Kaaru Cheekatilo" (Singer: Ghantasala)
- "Holiday Jollyday" (Singers: S. P. Balasubrahmanyam, B. Vasantha and P. Susheela)
- "Marali Marali Manushulu Marali" (Singer: T. M. Sounderarajan)
- "Papayi Navvali Pandage Ravali Maa Inta Kuravali Panneeru" (Singers: S. P. Balasubrahmanyam and P. Susheela; Cast: Shoban Babu and Sharada)
- "Toorupu Sindhoorapu Mandarapu Vannelalo Udayaragam" (Singers: S. P. Balasubrahmanyam and P. Susheela; Cast: Haranath and Kanchana)

== Box office ==
The film ran for more than 100 days in 5 centres (Vijayawada, Warangal, Rajahmundry, Hyderabad and Secunderabad) in Andhra Pradesh. It has completed Silver Jubilee celebrations.
