= Amiri Garibi =

- Theatrical release poster
- Directed by: Harmesh Malhotra
- Written by: Dr. Achala Nagar (dialogues)
- Screenplay by: K. B. Pathak
- Story by: K. B. Pathak
- Based on: Makutamleni Maharaju (1987)
- Produced by: Pradeep Sharma
- Starring: Jeetendra; Rekha; Rishi Kapoor; Neelam; Raj Babbar; Poonam Dhillon
- Cinematography: V. Durgaprasad
- Edited by: Govind Dalwadi
- Music by: Laxmikant–Pyarelal
- Production company: TUTU Films
- Release date: 23 March 1990
- Running time: 150 minutes
- Country: India
- Language: Hindi

Amiri Garibi (transl. Wealth and Poverty) is a 1990 Hindi-language drama film, produced by Pradeep Sharma under the TUTU Films banner and directed by Harmesh Malhotra. It stars Jeetendra, Rekha, Rishi Kapoor, Neelam, Raj Babbar, Poonam Dhillon and music composed by Laxmikant–Pyarelal. The film stars Krishna, Sridevi, and Rajendra Prasad in the pivotal roles. It is a remake of Telugu film Makutamleni Maharaju (1987).

== Plot ==
A wealthy Mumbai-based industrialist Kedarnath travels to a small town where his childhood friend Narayan resides. He meets with him, his wife Laxmi, and their daughter Rani. He proposes that Rani marry his son Rajesh and move with him to the city. Narayan and Laxmi are overjoyed. Soon a marriage takes place. When Rani reaches Kedarnath's house, she is welcomed neither by her mother-in-law Sheela nor by her husband and his sisters Jyoti and Pinky. She is ill-treated, belittled, slapped, and humiliated on every possible occasion.

Then the unexpected happens: Jyoti happens to be a child bride, married to a poor Bhardwaj family. Now Deepak Bhardwaj has grown up and has come to claim Jyoti as his wife and moves into their house, much to the chagrin of Jyoti, Rajesh, Pinky, and Sheela. Tragedy follows as Kedarnath passes away, leaving Rani and Deepak to the mercy of Sheela, who loses no time in turning the tables on them and asking them to leave the house. She is now busy preparing Rajesh's marriage to a young woman named Sona, who is not only rich but also beautiful and is ready to come to her home with a huge dowry. Sheela does not know that Sona has her own agenda and plan, which do not include Sheela at all.

== Cast ==
- Jeetendra as Heera
- Rekha as Sona
- Rishi Kapoor as Deepak Bhardwaj
- Neelam as Jyoti
- Raj Babbar as Rajesh
- Poonam Dhillon as Rani
- Shakti Kapoor as Sher Singh
- Pran as Narayan
- Urmila Bhatt as Laxmi
- Om Shivpuri as Kedarnath
- Rohini Hattangadi as Sheela
- Sushma Seth as Sona's Aunty
- Chand Usmani as Radha
- Jayshree Gadkar as Janki Bharadwaj
- Yunus Parvez as Mahajan
- Guddi Maruti às Baby, Rickshaw Passenger
- Lalita Kumari as Baby's Mom
- Rajesh Puri as Khairu
- Dan Dhanoa as Jaggu
- Gurbachan Singh as John

== Soundtrack ==
The music of the film was composed by Laxmikant–Pyarelal while the lyrics were written by Anand Bakshi. Alka Yagnik and Shailendra Singh were the playback singers.

#	Title	Singer(s)
1	"Bhool Vhulaiyya Teri Ankhiyan Saiyan"	Alka Yagnik
2	"Babul Bhi Roye"	Anuradha Paudwal, Kavita Krishnamurthy
3	"Budhi Ghodi Lal Lagaam"	Alka Yagnik
4	"O Meri Sasu, O Mere Sale"	Shailendra Singh
5	"Tawaif Kahan Kisi Se Mohabbat Karti Hai"	Alka Yagnik
