= Dushmun =

1972 film by Dulal Guha

- Poster
- Directed by: Dulal Guha
- Story by: Virendra Sinha
- Produced by: Premji
- Starring: Rajesh Khanna; Meena Kumari; Mumtaz
- Cinematography: M. Rajaram
- Music by: Laxmikant–Pyarelal
- Production company: Suchitra Productions
- Release date: 7 January 1972
- Running time: 177 mins
- Country: India
- Language: Hindi
- Box office: 5.5 crore

Dushmun (transl. Enemy) is a 1972 Indian Hindi-language film produced by Premji and directed by Dulal Guha. It is based on a novel by Virendra Sharma. The film stars Rajesh Khanna in the title role and for which he received a Filmfare nomination as Best Actor, the only nomination for the film. Meena Kumari, Mumtaz, Bindu, Rehman, Asit Sen and Johnny Walker are part of the cast.

The film became a "super-hit" at the box office and stood 3rd in a major top ten list. The 2012 review of the film by the newspaper The Hindu stated: "Essaying the role of Surjit Singh, a reckless, macho truck driver, with a penchant for consuming desi liquor and visiting brothels, the actor can be described in only one word — superb. Wearing fatigues for most of the film and donning a moustache, Khanna looks every bit the truck driver he portrays. He adapts to the role, discarding his trademark mannerism and style of dialogue delivery for a sprightly walk and body language that smacks of arrogance."

This film was made in Tamil as Needhi (1972), in Telugu as Khaidi Babai (1974), in Malayalam as Maattoly (1978) and in Kannada as Hosa Theerpu (1983).

== Plot ==
Surjit Singh is a rash truck driver who often drives while under the influence. One night, he stops at the prostitute Chamelibai's home. He spends the night with her, and gets up late the next morning. He rushes out and drives at breakneck-speed in thick fog to make up for the lost time while again drinking. He ends up running over and killing a farmer named Ram Din however, despite having the opportunity to run, he decides to stay and face the consequences. He is arrested by the police, charged, and brought before the court.

Surjit acknowledges his guilt to the Judge, who in turn knows that he should send Surjit to prison for two years. But moved by the plight of Ram Din's family (which include his widow Malti; his sister Kamla; two young sons; a crippled father Ganga Din, and his blind mother) and his inherent belief that imprisonment does not serve the good for victim or the perpetrator, the Judge resolves to try a novel experiment of forcing Surjit to live with Ram Din's family and look after their financial needs. A horrified Surjit attempts in vain to convince the Judge to change his ruling. He is transported to his new "prison" under police protection, where he is met by hostile villagers. Ram Din's family detest his presence, and calls him "Dushmun" (enemy). Surjit attempts to escape on the first night, but is apprehended and brought back to serve his time.

Surjit gradually comes to terms with the twist of fate that has forced him to become a farmer for subsistence and live under the ever unforgiving eyes of Ram Din's family. Over time, he starts sincerely working for the family and its interests. He meets Phoolmati, a happy-go-lucky girl who operates a small bioscope machine to entertain the village kids. They take an instant liking to each other, which blossoms into love. He also finds friends amongst the previously hostile villagers. He works hard on the family plot while also protecting it from the clutches of a local landlord, who has ill-intentioned designs on the land and also on Kamla.

Surmounting many obstacles, Surjit is able to arrange the marriage of Kamla with her childhood sweetheart. With the help of a benevolent police force and the Judge, he is also able to thwart the many attempts of the landlord to seize the family's land, and that of other villagers who have mortgaged their land with the same landlord. Malti however, is unable to forgive Surjit for having killed her husband.

Things take a dramatic turn for the worse when Surjit is framed and arrested for the accidental death of Phoolmati's drunk grandfather. At the same time, the landlord covertly sets the harvest, produced by Surjit and other villagers, on fire. He then has Phoolmati kidnapped, primarily to punish Surjit. Malti, who has been working in one of the landlord's saw mills thinking he is an honourable man, witnesses his misdeeds, and finally realizes her mistake. She is able to rescue Phoolmati, but gets trapped by the landlord instead, who attempts to rape her. Meanwhile, Surjit stages an escape from his holding cell and with the help of Phoolmati, is able to come to Malti's rescue in the nick of time. He confronts the landlord and violently assaults him. The police show up and arrest the landlord for his role in defrauding the villagers and destroying their harvest.

Ram Din's family finally accept Surjit as one of their own, and arrange his marriage to Phoolmati. In a final twist though, his two years' imprisonment is complete, and the Police arrive to escort him back to town. He pleads with the Judge to let him serve a life sentence, and the Judge smiles, vindicated that his experiment has been successful.

== Cast ==
- Meena Kumari as Malti
- Rajesh Khanna as Surjeet Singh
- Mumtaz as Phoolmati
- Naaz as Kamala
- Abhi Bhattacharya as Police Inspector
- Asit Sen as Head Constable Harishankar Chaurasiya
- Rehman as Judge
- Anwar Hussain as Timber Merchant
- Sajjan as Nainsukh
- Kanhaiyalal as Durga Prasad
- Nana Palsikar as Gangadin
- Leela Mishra as Mrs. Gangadin
- K. N. Singh as Public Prosecutor Saxena
- Ramayan Tiwari as Nana
- Murad as Supreme Court Judge
- Johnny Walker as Palmist
- Bindu as Chameli Bai
- Marutirao Parab as Barber
- Narbada Shankar as Panditji

== Remakes ==
Year	Film	Language	Ref.
1972	Needhi	Tamil	
1974	Khaidi Babai	Telugu	
1978	Maattoly	Malayalam	
1983	Hosa Theerpu	Kannada	

== Soundtrack ==
The Music was composed by Laxmikant Pyarelal and the lyrics were written by Anand Bakshi. The soundtrack had a rare Qawwali sung by Kishore Kumar which became popular.

Song	Singer
"Vaada Tera Vaada"	Kishore Kumar
"Maine Dekha, Tune Dekha, Isne Dekha, Usne Dekha"	Kishore Kumar, Lata Mangeshkar
"Balma Sipahiya"	Lata Mangeshkar
"Paisa Phenko Tamasha Dekho"	Lata Mangeshkar

== Awards and nominations ==
Rajesh Khanna received a Filmfare nomination for Best Actor, the only one for the film.
