= Chelleli Kapuram =

- Theatrical release poster
- Directed by: K. Viswanath
- Written by: Gollapudi Maruthi Rao; Mannava Balayya
- Produced by: Mannava Venkata Rao
- Starring: Sobhan Babu; Vanisri; Nagabhushanam; Sharada; K. V. Chalam
- Music by: K. V. Mahadevan
- Release date: 27 November 1971
- Country: India
- Language: Telugu

Chelleli Kapuram (transl. Sister's Household) is a 1971 Indian Telugu-language drama film written and directed by K. Viswanath. Produced by Mannava Balayya under the banner of Amrutha films. The film was remade in Tamil as Anbu Thangai.

== Plot ==
Ramu (Sobhan Babu) is a struggling poet. Because of his dark complexion, publishers are unwilling to publish his poetry. Sriram (Nagabhushanam) is his friend, and a small-time con-artist. He agrees to support Ramu. Ramu starts to publish his poems in Sriram's name. He agrees to do this as he needs money to perform his sister's marriage.

Sriram marries Ramu's sister (Manimala). As time goes by, using the poetry written by Ramu, Sriram gets quite rich. With the wealth come bad habits. Ramu does not confront Sriram and keeps quiet to ensure his sister's married life is not affected. A rich lady (Vanisri) admires Sriram's poetry and becomes a fan. Over time she realizes Sriram is a fraud, and suspects the truth. She comes up with a ruse to expose Sriram and elicit the truth.

== Cast ==
- Sobhan Babu as Ramu
- Nagabhushanam as Sriram
- Vanisri as Radha Devi
- Manimala as Seetha
- Rao Gopal Rao as Ramu's uncle
- Allu Ramalingaiah
- Nirmala
- Modukuri Satyam
- Kaikala Satyanarayana as Raghavaiah
- Kantha Rao
- Chalapathi Rao
- Chalam
- Mallikarjuna Rao
- Chandra Mohan

== Songs ==
- "Bhale Bhale Maa Annayya" - P. Susheela, S. P. Balasubrahmanyam (Lyrics: Kosaraju Raghavaiah)
- "Charana Kinkinulu...Adave Mayuri" - S. P. Balasubrahmanyam (Lyrics: C. Narayanareddy)
- "Ee Daari Naa Swamy Nadichene... Rane Vacchadu" - S. Janaki, P. B. Sreenivas (Lyrics: Devulapalli Krishnasastri)
- "Kanula Mundu Neevunte Kavita Pongi Paarada" - P. Susheela, S. P. Balasubrahmanyam (Lyrics: C. Narayanareddy)
- "Naa Chitti Naa Chinni" - P. Susheela, B. Vasantha
- "Kavithalu Pillagaali" - S. P. Balasubrahmanyam

== Awards ==
- Nandi Award for Best Feature Film - Gold - Mannava Venkata Rao
