= Khaidi Babai =

- Poster
- Directed by: Thirunagari Krishna
- Screenplay by: P. Satyanand
- Story by: Virendra Sinha
- Produced by: T. Babul Nath; J. Lakshman Rao
- Starring: Sobhan Babu; Vanisri; Sowcar Janaki
- Cinematography: T. M. Sundara Babu
- Edited by: Adurthi Haranath
- Music by: K. V. Mahadevan
- Production company: Sri Balaji Chitra
- Distributed by: Lakshmi Films
- Release date: 15 February 1974
- Running time: 174 minutes
- Country: India
- Language: Telugu

Khaidi Babai (transl. Prisoner Uncle) is a 1974 Indian Telugu-language film directed by T. Krishna. A remake of the 1971 Hindi film Dushmun, it stars Sobhan Babu, Vanisri and Sowcar Janaki. The film was released on 15 February 1974.

== Plot ==
A truck driver runs over and kills a man in an accident. Rather than being sent to prison, he is sentenced to provide for the victim's family as an alternative.

== Cast ==
- Sobhan Babu as the truck driver
- Vanisri as the bioscope girl
- Sowcar Janaki as the victim's wife
- Padmanabham as the police constable
- Gummadi as the victim's father
- Jaggayya as the judge
- Ramakrishna

== Production ==
Khaidi Babai is a remake of the 1971 Hindi film Dushmun. The film was directed by Thirunagari Krishna, produced by T. Babul Nath and J. Lakshman Rao under Sri Balaji Chitra. The screenplay was written by P. Satyanand, and dialogues by Bollimuntha Sivaramakrishna. Cinematography was handled by T. M. Sundara Babu, and editing by Adurthi Haranath.

== Soundtrack ==
The soundtrack was composed by K. V. Mahadevan.

== Release and reception ==
Khaidi Babai was released on 15 February 1974, and emerged a commercial success. Sobhan Babu won the Filmfare Award for Best Actor – Telugu.
