= Manchi Manushulu =

- Theatrical release poster
- Directed by: V. B. Rajendra Prasad
- Written by: Satyanand
- Screenplay by: Prayag Raj
- Story by: J. M. Desai
- Based on: Aa Gale Lag Jaa (1973)
- Produced by: V. B. Rajendra Prasad
- Starring: Sobhan Babu; Manjula
- Cinematography: S. Venkataratnam
- Edited by: A. Sanjeevi; A. V. Balu
- Music by: K. V. Mahadevan
- Production company: Jagapathi Art Pictures
- Distributed by: Annapurna Pictures
- Release date: 18 October 1974
- Running time: 2:11:57
- Country: India
- Language: Telugu
- Box office: ₹1 crore(equivalent to ₹27 crores in 2019)

Manchi Manushulu (transl. Good People) is a 1974 Indian Telugu-language drama film produced & directed by V. B. Rajendra Prasad under his Jagapathi Art Pictures banner. It stars Sobhan Babu and Manjula, with music composed by K. V. Mahadevan. It is a remake of the Hindi film Aa Gale Lag Jaa (1973).

== Plot ==
Radha (Manjula) is a medical student and daughter of a wealthy man, Raghupati Rao (Nagabhushanam). While on a trip to Simla, she meets and falls in love with Gopi (Sobhan Babu); they get intimate with each other. Gopi asks Raghupati Rao for his daughter's hand, but he refuses, on the ground that the hard-up Gopi is not worthy of her. Gopi leaves Radha a note, explaining that her father refused the alliance and that he is heading to meet his mother, who is very sick. Raghupati Rao gets hold of the letter before Radha. He changes the letter with a fake one that says Gopi is going away because Raghupati Rao has refused to provide any monetary compensation.

Years later, Gopi and Radha are fated to meet again. This time, Gopi is accompanied by a disabled boy, Babu (Master Tito), while Radha is about to get engaged to Dr. Ramesh (Jaggayya). It is revealed that Babu is Gopi and Radha's son. Gopi has come to Dr. Ramesh for Babu's treatment. Radha was pregnant when her father sent Gopi away. She gave birth to a baby, but her father told her that it was stillborn. Gopi took his son and promised Raghupati Rao that he would never tell Radha about the child. Dr. Ramesh treats Babu as Radha tries to hide her past from Dr. Ramesh. Radha learns the truth about Babu's birth and confronts her father, who confesses and asks her forgiveness while Babu is united with his parents.

== Cast ==
- Sobhan Babu as Gopi
- Manjula as Radha
- Jaggayya as Dr. Ramesh
- Nagabhushanam as Raghupati Rao
- Anjali Devi as Seetamma
- Raja Babu as 'Fatak' Rama Rao
- Dhulipala Dr. Anand
- Rao Gopal Rao as Dr. Murthy
- Mukkamala
- P. J. Sarma
- K. V. Chalam as Shopkeeper
- Sarathi as Shopkeeper
- Master Tito as Babu

== Soundtrack ==
All music is composed by K. V. Mahadevan.

No.	Title	Lyrics	Singer(s)	Length
1.	"Neevu Leka Nenu Lenu (Happy)"	Aatreya	S. P. Balasubrahmanyam, P. Susheela	4:33
2.	"Ninnu Marachipovalani"	Aatreya	S. P. Balasubrahmanyam	4:33
3.	"Padaku Padaku Ventapadaku"	Aatreya	S. P. Balasubrahmanyam, P. Susheela	6:34
4.	"Pellayyindi Prema Vinduku"	Aatreya	S. P. Balasubrahmanyam, P. Susheela	4:37
5.	"Vinu Naa Maata Vinnavante"	Arudra	S. P. Balasubrahmanyam, P. Susheela	4:03
6.	"Neevu Leka Nenu Lenu (Sad)"	Aatreya	S. P. Balasubrahmanyam, P. Susheela	3:42
7.	"Harilo Ranga Hari"	Aatreya	S. P. Balasubrahmanyam, P. Susheela	5:02

== Box office ==
- The film ran for more than 100 days in ten centers and celebrated a Silver Jubilee in Hyderabad.
