= Kurukshetram (1977 film) =

- Directed by: Kamalakara Kameswara Rao
- Written by: Samudrala Jr. (screenplay); Tripuraneni Maharadhi (dialogues)
- Produced by: A. S. R. Anjaneyulu
- Starring: Krishna; Sobhan Babu; Krishnam Raju; Jamuna; Vijaya Nirmala
- Cinematography: P. L. Roy
- Edited by: Kotagiri Gopala Rao
- Music by: S. Rajeswara Rao
- Production company: Madhavi Padmalaya Combines
- Release date: 14 January 1977
- Running time: 168 min.
- Country: India
- Language: Telugu

Kurukshetram is a 1977 Indian Telugu-language Hindu mythological film directed by Kamalakara Kameswara Rao. The film features an ensemble cast that includes Krishna, Sobhan Babu, Krishnam Raju, Jamuna, and Vijaya Nirmala. It was produced by A. S. R. Anjaneyulu, with Krishna serving as the presenter. The screenplay was written by Samudrala Jr., while the dialogues were penned by Tripuraneni Maharadhi. Notable supporting roles were played by Kaikala Satyanarayana, Anjali Devi, Jayaprada, Gummadi, and Chandra Mohan. The music was composed by Saluri Rajeswara Rao.

The film was shot in various locations, including Mysore and Rajasthan, and is notable for its elaborate sets and innovative production techniques, particularly for its time. Despite underperforming at the Telugu box office, Kurukshetram found success with its Hindi dubbed version. The film is recognized for its technical craftsmanship.

== Plot ==
The film depicts a series of key events from the Mahabharata, beginning with the division of the kingdom. It progresses through significant moments, including the marriage of Subhadra and Arjuna, the slaying of Jarasandha, the Rajasuya Yagna, the infamous dice game, the subsequent exile of the Pandavas, and culminates in the Kurukshetra War.

== Cast ==
- Krishna as Arjuna
- Sobhan Babu as Krishna
- Krishnam Raju as Karna
- Jamuna as Draupadi
- Kaikala Satyanarayana as Duryodhana
- Vijaya Nirmala as Subhadra
- Anjali Devi as Kunti
- Jaya Prada as Uttara
- Gummadi as Bhishma
- Nagabhushanam as Sakuni
- Rao Gopal Rao as Salya
- Kantha Rao as Drupada
- M. Balayya as Dharma Raju
- Chandra Mohan as Abhimanyu
- Randhawa as Bhima
- Dhulipala Seetarama Sastry as Indra
- Giri Babu as Dussasana
- Mukkamala as Dhrutarashtra
- Rama Krishna as Balarama
- Chandrakala as Rukmini
- Latha as Satyabhama
- Mohan Babu as Sisupala
- Tyagaraju as Saindhava
- P. J. Sarma as Krupacharya
- Jyothi Lakshmi as dancer in Mayasabha

== Production ==
=== Development ===
Kurukshetram and Daana Veera Soora Karna were produced around the same time. Krishna began the production of Kurukshetram in parallel with N. T. Rama Rao's Daana Veera Soora Karna. He co-produced the film with A. S. R. Anjaneyulu, who had previously produced Pandava Vanavasam (1965). The film was directed by Kamalakara Kameswara Rao, with K. S. R. Das overseeing the war sequences. Samudrala Jr. wrote the screenplay, while Tripuraneni Maharadhi wrote the dialogues. Despite being a long-time associate of N. T. Rama Rao, Kameswara Rao’s decision to direct Kurukshetram caused a strain in their relationship.

=== Casting ===
In Kurukshetram, Krishna portrayed Arjuna, while Sobhan Babu played Krishna, and Krishnam Raju took on the role of Karna. Satyanarayana appeared as Duryodhana, with Chandra Mohan as Abhimanyu, and Randhawa, son of renowned wrestler Dara Singh, as Bhima. Gummadi portrayed Bhishma. Only a few actors like Satyanarayana, Gummadi, Dhulipala, and Mukkamala, appeared in both Kurukshetram and Daana Veera Soora Karna.

=== Filming ===
Unlike Daana Veera Soora Karna, which was filmed entirely at Ramakrishna Cine Studios, Kurukshetram featured elaborate sets and was shot in various locations, including Mysore and Rajasthan, and Kurukshetra in Haryana. For the war scenes, Krishna took the crew along with elephants, horses, camels, and chariots to Kurukshetra. At a time when computer-generated graphics were not available, Krishna's innovative production techniques were considered groundbreaking in the Telugu film industry.

== Music ==
The music for Kurukshetram was composed by Saluri Rajeswara Rao, featuring lyrics by renowned writers such as Sri Sri, C. Narayana Reddy, Dasaradhi, Veturi, and Aarudra. Verses from Tirupati Venkata Kavulu, Karunasri, Samudrala Jr., and Joshua were also included. The film notably featured recitations from the Bhagavad Gita by Ghantasala, which were secured by Padmalaya Studios after his death. Notable songs from the soundtrack include "Mrogindi Kalyana Veena" and "Dharmakshetram Idhi Kurukshetram."

Track list
No.	Title	Lyrics	Singer(s)	Length
1.	"Dharma Kshetram"	Sri Sri	S. P. Balasubrahmanyam
2.	"Alukala Kulukula"	Veturi	S. P. Balasubrahmanyam, P. Suseela
3.	"Ide Mayasabha Mandiram"	Jr. Samudrala	B. Vasantha, Vani Jairam
4.	"Harivillu Divinunchi"	Dasarathi	P. Suseela, V. Ramakrishna
5.	"Mrogindi Kalyanaveena"	C. Narayana Reddy	S. P. Balasubrahmanyam, P. Suseela

== Reception ==
Despite underperforming at the Telugu box office, Kurukshetram received some appreciation in Bangalore, while its Hindi dubbed version achieved significant success. The film is recognized for its technical superiority and innovative production techniques, showcasing Krishna's dedication. However, critics felt that Krishna and Sobhan Babu's portrayals of Arjuna and Krishna did not resonate as strongly as N. T. Rama Rao's previous performances, which was seen as a disadvantage for Kurukshetram. In contrast, Satyanarayana's portrayal of Duryodhana received praise, reminiscent of S. V. Ranga Rao's powerful performances in similar roles. In retrospect, while Daana Veera Soora Karna became a blockbuster, Kurukshetram is noted for its ensemble cast and production quality.
