= Andhra Prabha =

Telugu language daily newspaper of India

- Journalism first !
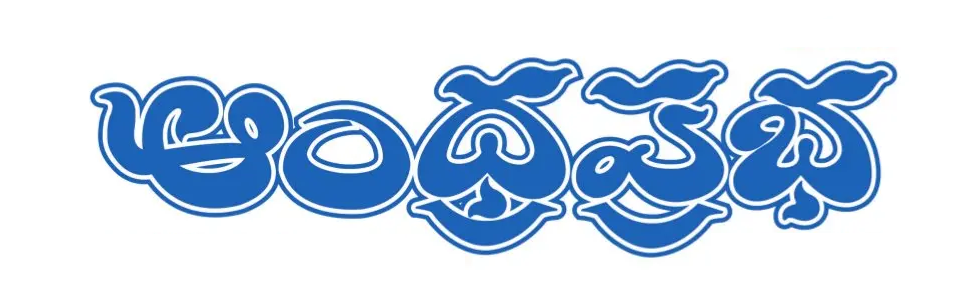
- Type: Daily newspaper
- Format: Broadsheet
- Owner: Muttha Gopalakrishna
- Founder: Ramnath Goenka
- Publisher: Andhra Prabha Publications Ltd.
- Editor: Muttha Goutham
- Founded: 15 August 1938
- Language: Telugu
- Headquarters: Hyderabad, India
- Website: Official website

Andhra Prabha is a Telugu-language daily newspaper in India, circulated primarily in Andhra Pradesh and Telangana. Founded on 15th August 1938, by Ramnath Goenka under the Indian Express Group, it has become one of the longest-running Telugu dailies. Over the decades, the newspaper has undergone various editorial and ownership changes, including a transition from The New Indian Express Group to its current proprietorship under Muttha Gopalakrishna, a businessman and former MLA from Kakinada. Andhra Prabha also expanded into broadcasting in 2018 with the launch of India Ahead, a nationwide English news channel, marking a significant step as the first channel to be based in South India.

== Early history ==
Andhra Prabha was started in Madras (now, Chennai) on 15 August 1938 by Ramnath Goenka under his Indian Express Group and published from major towns inside Andhra Pradesh from the 1950s to challenge the prominence of the then leading Telugu newspaper, Andhra Patrika. In 1960, Andhra Prabha's circulation was 53,000 for its two editions from Vijayawada and Chittoor. Ten years later, then publishing from Vijayawada and Bangalore circulation reached 1,16,000, vastly surpassing that of Andhra Patrika.

A reader from Ballari originally suggested the name "Andhra Prabha" and the management of the newspaper awarded him the sum of ₹116 as a token of their gratitude. The paper was initially edited by Khasa Subba Rao (joint editor of Indian Express) who was succeeded by Nyayapati Narayana Murthy. In 1942, Narla Venkateswara Rao was promoted from news-editor to editor of the paper. He held this position for seventeen years. He was responsible for major revolutionary changes in headline and caption writing, in the framing of action photos, in news display and in page make-up. It was during Narla's editorship that the paper was closed down briefly for the Quit India Movement. The newspaper was shut down for a few months in order to protest the British Government's attempt to impose censorship on the press. The Andhra Prabha was also banned from the State of Mysore and the State of Hyderabad because it opposed the feudal nature of these regimes. Narla later tendered his resignation when he had a falling-out with Ramnath Goenka over his sympathy with the workers in the press which resulted in a strike in Madras. He was succeeded by Neelamraju Venkataseshaiah. Venkataseshaiah was succeeded by Panditharadhyula Nageswara Rao, from 1969–1976.

In July 2018, it entered into broadcasting space by launching a nationwide English news channel named "India Ahead". It became the first English News Channel to be beamed out of South India.

== Editions ==
Currently there are editions of Andhra Prabha in Bangalore, Hyderabad, Chennai, Visakhapatnam and Vijayawada. Until 1959, Andhra Prabha was published only from Madras (now Chennai). In 1960, anticipating the impending launch of Andhra Jyothy, Andhra Prabha launched its second edition from Vijayawada. A Chittoor edition was brought out briefly in the early 1960s which was shifted to Bangalore in 1966. A Hyderabad edition was launched in 1977 and, in 1985, to counter the launch of Eenadu, an edition was launched in Visakhapatnam.

== Features and supplements ==
Alternate logo on Sunday's Mini Weekly supplement

The paper carries the following features regularly – Muhurtam, Graha Balam, Kreeda Prabha, Aurah!, Nayika and Chintana.
Supplements include:

- Monday : Sahiti Gavaksham, Chintana, Life
- Tuesday : Kulasa, Chintana
- Wednesday: Yuva, Chintana
- Thursday : Chitraprabha
- Friday : Sirigamulu
- Saturday : Bala Prabha (Entertainment and Knowledge for kids), Chintana
- Sunday : A 32 Page Mini Weekly
