= Panditharadhyula Nageswara Rao =

- Born: 26 March 1912; Inturu, Guntur district, Andhra Pradesh
- Died: 13 November 1976 (aged 64)
- Occupation: journalist
- Spouse: Parvatha Vardhani
- Parent(s): Mallayya, Bhairavamba

Panditharadhyula Nageswara Rao (26 March 1912 – 13 November 1976) was a Telugu-language Indian journalist.

Nageswara Rao was born in Inturu, in the Guntur district of Andhra, to a Brahmin couple Mallayya and Bhairavamba. With due respect for weavers, he wore khadi from his college days.

He started his career during the last years of British Rule in India and continued with his editorials after Independence. He came to prominence with Andhra Janatha and Andhra Prabha

When a newspaper was the only medium of communication just after independence, Panditharadhyula Nageswara Rao garu rose high during the congress reign proving that "Pen is mightier than the sword".

He wrote several short stories about Gods and the famous ones include "The fight between Vali & Sugreeva and Hidden Rama".

"Railu Tappina Prayanikulu" was one of the powerful editorials by him which helped Congress win the 1956 elections. This fetched him national acclaim and he was visited by Lal Bahadur Sastri garu (the then Prime Minister of India) and Subhash Chandra Bose. He was a close associate of Jalagam Vengala Rao garu, Timmareddy garu, N.G. Ranga Garu, Neelam Sanjeeva Reddy garu and Kasu Brahmananda Reddy garu. He never aimed at achieving 'Name and Fame' but always believed in the sincerity of his writings by being lawful and reasonable. This created the struggle for the pen and the wallet. But the mighty pen never stayed quiet. He took a step ahead and started an English Weekly "Pedestrian".

Nageswara Rao was married to Paravatha Vardhani. The couple had three sons and two daughters. He lost his elder son in August 1976. On 13 November 1976 he died due to cardiac arrest.

== Career ==
Nageswara Rao Garu had been the Editor for the following: In Chronological Order

- GoBhoomi (during the British Rule)
- Vahini political weekly (founded by N G Ranga).
- Kranthi Magazine.
- Andhra Patrika NewsPaper - (1943-1959) Madras
- Andhra Bhoomi NewsPaper - (1960) Founder
- Sanjaya Magazine
- Andhra Janatha Newspaper (APCC - 1965)
- Praja Prabha Weekly Magazine
- Pedestrian English Newspaper
- Andhra Prabha Newspaper (1966 - 1976 - till his death)
