= Aa Gale Lag Jaa (1973 film) =

1973 Indian Hindi film

- Poster
- Directed by: Manmohan Desai
- Written by: Smt. Jeevanprabha Desai; K. B. Pathak; Prayag Raj
- Produced by: A. K. Nadiadwala
- Starring: Shashi Kapoor; Sharmila Tagore; Shatrughan Sinha; Om Prakash
- Cinematography: Peter Pereira
- Edited by: Kamlakar Kamkhanis
- Music by: Rahul Dev Burman
- Production companies: K. Asif Studios; Ranjeet Studios; Swati Studios
- Distributed by: A. K. Movies; Polydor
- Release date: 16 November 1973
- Running time: 149 minutes
- Country: India
- Language: Hindi
- Box office: ₹3 crore (equivalent to ₹126 crore or US$13 million in 2026)

Aa Gale Lag Jaa (transl. Come, embrace me) is a 1973 Hindi romantic film directed by Manmohan Desai, based on a story by Smt. Jeevanprabha Desai. It stars Shashi Kapoor, Sharmila Tagore and Shatrughan Sinha. The film became a box office hit and was the 10th highest grossing Hindi film of 1973.

Poornima received a Filmfare nomination as Best Female Playback Singer for the song "Tera Mujhse Hai." Her nomination is the only Filmfare nomination for the film. Aa Gale Lag Jaa is noted for its wonderful hit songs which had music by R.D. Burman with lyrics by Sahir Ludhianvi.

The film was remade in Telugu as Manchi Manushulu, in Tamil as Uthaman and in Persian as Ranande-ye-ejbari. The Sinhalese movie Yali Hamuwennai directed by Sena Samarasinghe in the 1980s is said to be a direct copy of this film. The 1977 Pakistani movie Aina and the 1985 Hindi movie Pyar Jhukta Nahin were also inspired by this movie.

== Plot ==
Preeti is a young medico living in Mumbai with her widowed father, Heerachand. While holidaying in Simla, she meets Prem, an amateur skater who initially teases her but later falls in love with her. Preeti eventually reciprocates his feelings. During a trip to the hills, she has an accident and loses consciousness. To save her from hypothermia, Prem stays close to her, and they become intimate.

Afterwards, Prem explains that he became intimate with her only to save her and proposes marriage. Preeti accepts and sends him to speak to her father. Heerachand, however, opposes the marriage and offers Prem money to leave her. When Prem refuses, he leaves Preeti a letter explaining everything and asking her to elope with him. Heerachand intercepts the letter and rewrites it to make it appear that Prem is demanding money to marry her. Hurt and disillusioned, Preeti decides to forget Prem and returns to Bombay.

There, she becomes engaged to Dr Amar, her long-time friend and admirer. Amar leaves for Germany for higher studies, after which Preeti discovers that she is pregnant. Heerachand wants her to abort the child, but she refuses. They eventually go to Khandala, where Preeti gives birth to a healthy boy, unbeknownst to her that Prem is also there with his mother. Prem asks to take the child, and Heerachand agrees. Preeti is told that the baby was stillborn, and she returns to Bombay grieving.

Prem brings his son to Bombay and becomes a skating teacher. The boy, Rahul, is unable to walk after contracting polio. Years later, Prem and Preeti meet again at a function. Preeti assumes that Prem married and had a son. Amar announces that he will not marry until he succeeds in helping Rahul walk, and begins treating him. Meanwhile, Preeti becomes attached to Rahul without realising that he is her son. She attempts to speak to Prem, who discovers that Heerachand altered his letter, but remains silent for Amar's sake.

Amar eventually learns the truth about Preeti, Prem and Rahul. He succeeds in helping Rahul walk. Later, Prem is mortally injured while rescuing Tikki, Amar's sister, from goons. Before undergoing surgery, he gives Rahul his wallet, saying that it contains a photograph of his mother. When Preeti sees the photograph, she questions Heerachand, who confesses that he concealed the truth and that Rahul is her son. Amar saves Prem, and the family reconciles. Preeti and Prem marry and live happily with Rahul.

== Cast ==
Actor/Actress	Role
Shashi Kapoor	Prem
Sharmila Tagore	Preeti
Shatrughan Sinha	Dr. Amar
Om Prakash	Heera Chand
Jagdeep	Jaggi
Shubha Khote	Nurse Julie
Gajanan Jagirdar	Dr. Saxena
Sulochana Latkar	Prem's mother
Roohi Berde	Tikki
Jillani	
Kunal Kapoor	Cameo as child skating
Hari Kapoor	
Maqbool	
Prathiba	
Master Tito	Nitin Dawane

== Soundtrack ==
The songs of this movie were composed by legendary music composer Rahul Dev Burman and the lyrics were penned by Sahir Ludhianvi. The songs of this movie are popular till today, especially "Vaada Karo" and "Tera Mujhse Hai Pehle Ka Nata Koi" are remembered till this day. The song "Vaada Karo" is an adaptation of "Song for my Father" by Horace Silver. The first line of "Tera Mujhse Hai Pehle Ka Nata Koi" was inspired by "The Yellow Rose of Texas".

- 01. "Vaada Karo"... Kishore Kumar and Lata Mangeshkar
- 02. "Na Koi Dil Mein Samaya"... Kishore Kumar
- 03. "Tera Mujhse Hain Pehle Ka Nata Koi" (Duet)... Kishore Kumar and Sushma Shrestha
- 04. "Tera Mujhse Hain Pehle Ka Nata Koi" (Male)... Kishore Kumar
- 05. "Aye Mere Bete" (Happy)... Kishore Kumar and Sushma Shrestha
- 06. "Aye Mere Bete" (Sad)... Kishore Kumar

== In popular culture ==
=== Cult Status in Algeria ===
The film has enjoyed an unusual cult status in Algeria since its release. The cult following remains four decades since the film's release. The movie there is called JANITOU.
