= Desamante Manushuloyi =

- Directed by: C. S. Rao
- Produced by: K. M. K. Naidu; G. K. Naidu
- Starring: Sobhan Babu; S. V. Ranga Rao; Anjali Devi
- Cinematography: S. Rajeswara Rao
- Distributed by: Filmkrafts
- Release date: 1 January 1970
- Country: India
- Language: Telugu

Desamante Manushuloyi is a 1970 Indian Telugu-language political social problem film. The film was directed by C. S. Rao. It received the 1970 National Film Award for Best Feature Film in Telugu.

== Awards ==
National Film Awards

- National Film Award for Best Feature Film in Telugu - 1970
