= Tara Sasankam =

Tara Sasankam is a play written by Kopparapu Subba Rao. It has been performed about 1,500 times under his own direction.

It was published in 1945 by Modern Publishers, Tenali. Subsequently, three editions were brought out. There was a lawsuit filed by the publishers on behalf of K. Satyanarayana of Ramakrishna pictures, the producers of the 1969 film.

== Plotknow the ==
The story is based on the love affair between Tara, (wife of Brihaspati) and Sasank (Chandra). Tara, the wife of pious teacher Brihaspati successfully seduces his student Sasank. They had a child by their illicit union. This results in a dispute between the teacher and his student about the fatherhood of the boy. It goes to the court of the Gods; who express their inability to solve the issue. Tara herself had to decide that the child was born of the student.

== 1941 film ==
Tara Sasankam was produced as a film in Telugu language in 1941 under the direction of R. S. Prakash, starring veteran stage actor and singer P. Suri Babu, Pushpavalli and Sundaramma.

=== Soundtrack ===
- "Andamugaa alankarista poyiraave priyunikorakai"
- "Auraa entati droha buddiviraa chandraa"
- "Dharani yantaa taaraamayamai kaanupinche naa kanulaku"
- "Enta Ghora Patakame Nee Charitamu Tata"-"Nava Yavvammu Sashvatamani Namminavu Tara" (Singer: P. Suribabu)
- "Laagaraa sakhudaa naa padava laagara"
- "Nee vooru nee peru telupavate baalaa"
- "Talliveeve tandriveeve daivameevegaa"
- "Viphalamaipoyegaa naa bratuke vrudhaa"
- "Youvaname haayi jagatilo youvaname haayi"

== 1969 film ==
Tara Sasankam
- Poster
- Directed by: Manapuram Appa Rao
- Written by: Kopparapu Subbarao
- Produced by: K. Satyanarayana
- Starring: Shoban Babu; Devika; Gummadi; T. L. Kanta Rao; Haranath
- Music by: T. V. Raju
- Release date: 1969
- Country: India
- Language: Telugu

Tara Sasankam was filmed in 1969, directed by Manapuram Appa Rao and produced by K. Satyanarayana of Ramakrishna Pictures. It starred Devika as Tara and Sobhan Babu as Sashank. Gummadi played the role of Brihaspati. The other key roles are played by T. L. Kanta Rao, Haranath and Ramakrishna.

=== Soundtrack ===
There are about 25 songs and poems in the film Tara Sasankam. The music score was provided by T. V. Raju.

- "Bhaliraa Maaya Lola Souri – Oohateetamu Nee Maaya" (Lyrics: Rajasri; Singer: Ghantasala)
- "Vande Janani Vande Sudhavahini" (Lyrics: C. Narayana Reddy; Singers: Ghantasala and P. B. Srinivas)
- "Vu Andi Andala Tara – Emandi Naa Prema Tara" (Lyrics: Samudrala Jr.; Singers: Ghantasala and P. Susheela)
