= Maa Voori Magadu =

1987 Telugu action drama film by K. Bapayya

- Directed by: K. Bapayya
- Written by: Paruchuri Brothers
- Produced by: T. Srinivasa Reddy
- Starring: Krishna Ghattamaneni; Sridevi; Kaikala Satyanarayana; Nutan Prasad; Ramakrishna; Suttivelu; Kota Srinivasa Rao; Gollapudi Maruti Rao; Chalapathi Rao
- Cinematography: A. Venkat
- Edited by: D. Venkataratnam
- Music by: Chakravarthy
- Production company: Sri Vinay Art Pictures
- Release date: 30 October 1987
- Country: India
- Language: Telugu

Maa Voori Magadu is a 1987 Indian Telugu action drama film starring Krishna Ghattamaneni, Sridevi and Kaikala Satyanarayana in the lead roles alongside an ensemble supporting cast which includes Gollapudi Maruti Rao, Nutan Prasad, Suttivelu and Kota Srinivasa Rao. Scripted by Paruchuri Brothers, directed by K. Bapayya and produced by T. Srinivasa Reddy for Sri Vinay Art Pictures, the film had musical score by Chakravarthy. Released on 30 October 1987, the film is an average fare at the box office. The film was dubbed in Hindi as Aaj ka Gangwar.

== Cast ==
- Krishna Ghattamaneni as Ravi
- Sridevi as Rajini
- Kaikala Satyanarayana as Kaleswara rao
- Nutan Prasad as Sivayya, The Drunkard
- Gollapudi Maruti Rao as Vande Mataram Babai
- Suthi Velu as Simhachalam
- Ramakrishna as Raghuram
- Sutti Veerabhadra Rao
- Kota Srinivasa Rao as Sathakopam
- Chalapathi Rao as Masthan
- Narra Venkateswara Rao as Lal
- Balaji as Bhaskaram
- Raavi Kondala Rao
- Sakshi Ranga Rao
- Jayanthi
- Aruna
- Srilakshmi as Annapurna
- Jaya Bhaskar
- Chidathala Appa Rao

== Music ==
The film's soundtrack album comprising 5 tracks was scored and composed by Chakravarthy and lyrics penned by Veturi Sundararama Murthy.

1. "Sunnam Pettuko" — P. Susheela, Raj Seetharam
2. "Yadagiri Guttakada" — P. Susheela, Raj Seetharam
3. "Aa Malla Mogga" — P. Susheela, Raj Seetharam
4. "Siggenduke" — P. Susheela, Raj Seetharam
5. "Thank O Thank" — P. Susheela, Raj Seetharam
