= Nagabhushanam (actor) =

Indian actor

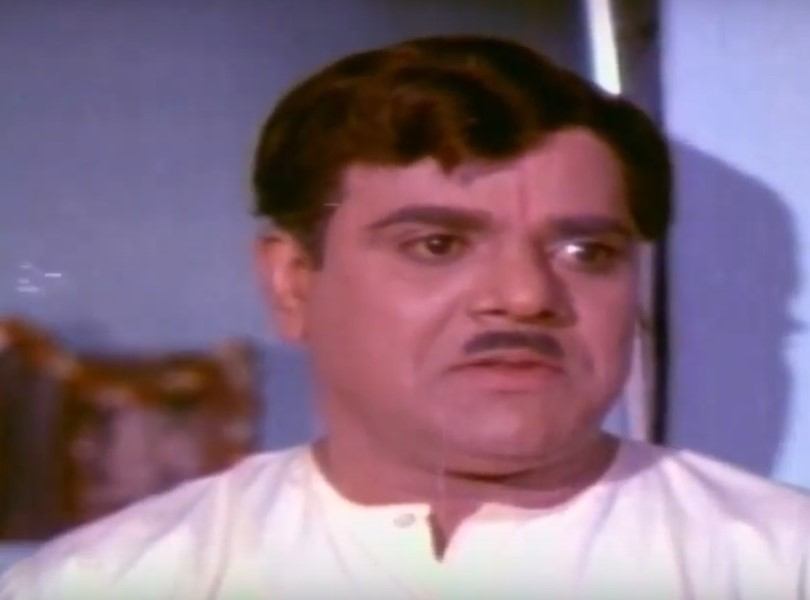
- Nagabhushanam in a scene from Kalyana Mandapam (1971)
- Born: Chundi Nagabhushanam; 19 March 1922
- Died: 5 May 1995 (73 years)
- Occupation: Actor
- Children: Chundi Raghava Rao; Gowriswari

C. Nagabushanam (19 March 1922 – 5 May 1995) was an Indian actor known for his work in Telugu cinema and theatre. He acted in more than 350 films from the 1950s to the 1980s. He primarily acted in villain and character actor roles. Nagabushanam was a trendsetter in enacting comic villain characters. He was also known by the title “Natabhooshana” (transl. Jewel of acting).

He acted in with more than 5000 shows of the play Raktha Kanneeru (transl. Tears of blood) due to which he also became known as “Raktha Kanneeru Nagabhushanam”. His first film was Palletooru (1952). He also played the lead role in the 1956 film Edi Nijam which won the Certificate of Merit at the 4th National Film Awards. His other notable films include Mayabazar (1957), Mosagallaku Mosagadu (1971), Mohammad bin Tughlaq (1972), Ida Lokam (1973), Andala Ramudu (1973), and Kurukshetram (1977).

Nagabushanam also produced a handful of films, including Natakala Rayudu (1969) and Oke Kutumbam (1970). He died on 5 May 1995.

== Personal life ==
Chundi Nagabhushanam was born into a Telugu speaking family in Nellore, Andhra Pradesh. He did odd jobs before he joined the railways and later the film industry. Nagabhushanam had three sons and two daughters and seven grand children. None of them are into film industry.

== Filmography ==
Year	Film	Role
1952	Palletooru	Kondayya
1954	Rechukka	Chitti Veeranna
1955	Ardhangi	Veerayya
1956	Edi Nijam	Kondayya
1956	Penki Pellam	
1956	Uma Sundari	Lord Siva
1957	Bhagya Rekha	Kotayya
1957	Maya Bazaar	Satyaki
1958	Bhookailas	Lord Siva
1958	Chenchu Lakshmi	Lord Siva
1960	Bhatti Vikramarka	Prachandudu
1962	Bhishma	Parasurama
1962	Manchi Manasulu	Kumar
1964	Mooga Manasulu	Rajendra
1965	Zamindar	
1965	Thodu Needa	
1965	Visala Hrudayalu	Pattabhi
1966	Aame Evaru?	
1967	Ave Kallu	Doctor
1967	Ummadi Kutumbam	Zamindar Bhavani Prasad
1967	Upayamlo Apayam	
1967	Aada Paduchu	Rao Bahadur Ranga Rao
1968	Bandipotu Dongalu	Varaha Murthy
1968	Bhale Kodallu	Sankaram
1968	Bangaru Gajulu	
1968	Ranabheri	
1968	Varakatnam	Meesala Venkayya
1968	Nenante Nene	
1968	Vintha Kapuram	Srinivasa Rao
1968	Brahmachari	Rao Sahib Parandhamaiah
1968	Thalli Prema	Viswaroopam
1969	Muhurtha Balam	Raja Bhujanga Rao aka Bhujangam
1969	Aadarsa Kutumbam	
1969	Aatmiyulu	Justice Rajaram
1969	Bhale Rangadu	Zamindar
1969	Vichitra Kutumbam	Nagaraju
1969	Buddhimantudu	Seshayya
1969	Natakala Rayudu	Bujjibabu
1969	Mathru Devata	
1969	Sabash Satyam	
1969	Sipayi Chinnayya	Chokka Rao
1970	Thalla? Pellama?	Prabhakar
1970	Amma Kosam	Bhujanga Rao
1970	Vidhi Vilasam	Kamesam
1970	Balaraju Katha	
1970	Oke Kutumbam	Marthandam
1970	Dharma Daata	Zamindar Bhujanga Rao
1970	Jai Jawan	
1970	Pettandarulu	
1970	Mayani Mamata	Jagannatham
1970	Ali Baba 40 Dongalu	
1971	Chelleli Kapuram	
1971	Atthalu Kodallu	Giri Babu
1971	Dasara Bullodu	Chandrakala's father
1971	Adrusta Jathakudu	Raja Raghunatha Rao
1971	Kathanayakuralu	Diwan Bahadur Satya Rao
1971	Mosagallaku Mosagadu	Nakkajittula Naganna
1971	Pattukunte Laksha	
1971	Amaayakuraalu	Ananda Rao
1971	Sri Krishna Vijayamu	Paundraka Vasudeva
1971	Tahsildar Gari Ammayi	Venkataramayya
1972	Mohammad Bin Tuglaq	
1972	Datta Putrudu	
1972	Badi Panthulu	Papa Rao
1972	Bala Mitrula Katha	Papayya
1972	Anta Mana Manchike	Phanibhushana Rao
1972	Manchi Rojulu Vachayi	Karanam Kamaiah
1972	Collector Janaki	
1972	Praja Nayakudu	
1973	Desoddharakulu	Rajabhushanam
1973	Nindu Kutumbam	Dakkinapally Dharmarao
1973	Andala Ramudu	J. B. Rao
1973	Bangaru Babu	Jagannatham
1973	Palletoori Bava	Bheema Rao
1973	Srivaru Maavaru	Jagapathi
1973	Marapurani Manishi	Varaalu
1973	Vaade Veedu	Kodandam
1973	Mayadari Malligadu	Rangaraju
1974	Manchi Manushulu	Raghupati Rao
1974	Andaru Dongale	Bujji Babu
1974	Uttama Illalu	Sivayya/Bhujangam
1974	Gundelu Teesina Monagadu	
1974	Chakravakam	Jagapati
1975	Devudu Chesina Pelli	Justice Ranga Rao
1975	Bhagasthulu	Bhushanam
1975	Moguda Pellama	Lingayya
1976	Padi Pantalu	Guravayya
1976	Alludochadu	Vishaka Rao
1976	Bhale Dongalu	Chinna
1976	Maa Daivam	
1977	Aalu Magalu	Raja Raghavendra Bahadoor
1977	Eenati Bandham Yenatido	Dayasagaram
1977	Jeevithamlo Vasantham	Major Prathapa Rao
1977	Adavi Ramudu	
1977	Dongalaku Donga	Seethapati
1977	Kurukshetram	Sakuni
1978	Vichitra Jeevitham	
1978	Amara Prema	
1978	Dudu Basavanna	Meesala Sivaramakrishnayya
1978	Sri Rama Raksha	Chakrapani
1978	Patnavasam	Vishwanatham
1978	Melu Kolupu	Dayanidhi
1979	Iddaru Asadhyule	
1979	Gopala Rao Gari Ammayi	Zamindar Gajapathi Raju
1979	Dongalaku Saval	Paramatma
1979	Burripalem Bullodu	Chidambaram
1979	Amma Evarikaina Amma	Malu
1980	Bangaru Bava	Kodandam
1980	Jathara	Bhushaiah
1980	Gayyali Gangamma	
1980	Sirimalle Navvindi	
1980	Pelli Gola	Vishnumurthy
1980	Alludu Pattina Bharatam	
1980	Bhale Krishnudu	Karunakaram
1981	Swargam	Chakrapani
1981	Guru Sishyulu	Bhujangam
1981	Ragile Jwala	Bhushanam
1981	Maro Kurukshetram	
1981	Gadasari Attaha Sosagara Kodalu	Gajapathi Raju
1981	Jathagadu	Lakshmipati
1981	Prema Natakam	Lakshmipati
1982	Pagabattina Simham	Picheswara Rao
1982	Korukunna Mogudu	Prabhakara Rao
1982	Iddaru Kodukulu	Kailasam
1983	Neti Bharatam	Dattatreyulu
1984	Nayakulaku Saval	Murikipudi Bangaraiah
1988	Aatma Katha	
1989	Rajakeeya Chadarangam	President Parandhamayya
1994	Number One	
1994	Palletoori Mogudu	
