= Soggadu (1975 film) =

- Poster
- Directed by: K. Bapayya
- Written by: Modukuri Johnson (Dialogues)
- Story by: Balamurugan
- Produced by: D. Rama Naidu
- Starring: Sobhan Babu; Jayachitra; Jayasudha
- Cinematography: A. Vincent
- Edited by: Narasimha Rao
- Music by: K. V. Mahadevan
- Production company: Suresh Productions
- Release date: 19 December 1975
- Running time: 155 minutes
- Country: India
- Language: Telugu

Soggadu (transl. Charmer) is a 1975 Indian Telugu-language drama film directed by K. Bapayya and produced by D. Ramanaidu under Suresh Productions. The film stars Sobhan Babu as the title character alongside Jayachitra and Jayasudha. Anjali Devi, Kaikala Satyanarayana, Raja Babu, Allu Ramalingaiah, Santha Kumari, and Nagesh play supporting roles. Released on 19 December 1975, the film was a big commercial success. It was remade in Hindi as Dildaar (1977) and in Tamil as Radhaiketra Kannan (1978).

== Plot ==
Sobhanadri is popularly known as 'Soggadu' in his native village. He loves his cross-cousin Saroja. Saroja's father Paramesam does not approve. He wants Saroja to marry a well-educated individual. Sobhanadri challenges Paramesam that he will marry an educated girl. He leaves for the city, where he meets Saroja's classmate Latha. Latha has run away to escape from a forced marriage with her uncle Bhupathi. Latha and Sobhanadri get married in a hotel. Bhupathi files a case against Sobhanadri. Finally Sobhanadri and Latha reunite happily.

== Cast ==
- Sobhan Babu as Sobhanadri (Soggadu)
- Jayachitra as Latha
- Jayasudha as Saroja
- Anjali Devi
- Allu Ramalingaiah as Paramesam
- Kaikala Satyanarayana as Bhupathi
- Nagesh as Sanyasi Rao
- Raja Babu as Rajendra Prasad
- T. Subbarami Reddy as District Collector
- Gummadi as Simhadri
- Ramaprabha as Gajalakshmi
- B. Padmanabham as Saleem
- Manju Bhargavi as Savithri

== Production ==
Ramanaidu approached Bapayya who was making Eduruleni Manishi at that time to make Soggadu for him based on a story by Balamurugan. The film marked the debut of Jayachithra in Telugu cinema. She revealed since most of the film were shot in outdoor locations she was not part of them and her scenes were completed first so that her role will be completed. The film was mostly shot in Mandapeta, Sakinetipalli, Karamchedu, Kolavennu, and Elamarru while the indoor shots and the song "Chali Vestondi" was shot in AVM studios and Vijaya Vauhini Studios. Some scenes were shot in Hyderabad while ox race was shot in Karamchedu.

== Awards ==
- Sobhan Babu won third consecutive Filmfare Best Actor Award (Telugu) for portraying role of Soggadu.
- D. Rama Naidu won Filmfare Best Film Award (Telugu).

== Soundtrack ==
Soundtrack was composed by K. V. Mahadevan.

- "Avvaa Buvvaa Kaavaalante Ayyedenaa Abbaayii" (Lyrics: Aathreya; Singers: P. Susheela, S. P. Balasubrahmanyam; Cast: Sobhan Babu, Jayasudha)
- "Chali Vestondi, Champestondi, Korikestondi" (Lyrics: Aathreya; Singers: P. Susheela, S. P. Balasubrahmanyam; Cast: Sobhan Babu, Jayasudha)
- "Edukondalavaadaa, Venkatesaa, Orayyo, Entapani Chesaavu, Tirumalesaa" (Lyrics: Aathreya; Singers: P. Susheela, S. P. Balasubrahmanyam; Cast: Sobhan Babu, Jayachitra)
- "Edukondalavaadaa, Venaktesaa, Orayyo, Entapani Chesaavu, Tirumalesaa!" (Pathos) (Lyrics: Aathreya; Singers: P. Susheela, S. P. Balasubrahmanyam; Cast: Sobhan Babu, Jayachitra)
- "Ole Ole, Olammii Uffantene Ulikkipaddaavu" (Lyrics: Aathreya; Singers: P. Susheela, S. P. Balasubrahmanyam; Cast: Sobhan Babu, Jayachitra)
- "Soggaadu Lechaadu, Choochi Choochi Nee Dummu Leputaadu!" (Lyrics: Aathreya; Singers: P. Susheela, S. P. Balasubrahmanyam; Cast: Sobhan Babu, Manjubhargavi, Jayachitra, Jayasudha)

== Box office ==
The film ran for more than 100 days in 17 centres in Andhra Pradesh. The 100-days function was celebrated on the 115th day at Vijayawada Municipal Grounds with Sivaji Ganesan as the chief guest.
