= Daiva Balam =

- Theatrical release poster
- Directed by: Ponnaluru Vasanthakumar Reddy
- Written by: Parasuram (dialogues)
- Screenplay by: Ponnaluru Vasanthakumar Reddy
- Story by: Ponnaluri Brothers Unit
- Produced by: Ponnaluru Vasanthakumar Reddy
- Starring: N. T. Rama Rao; Jayasri
- Cinematography: B. J. Reddy
- Edited by: Rajan
- Music by: Ashwatthama
- Production company: Ponnaluri Brothers Pvt Ltd
- Release date: 17 September 1959
- Running time: 126 minutes
- Country: India
- Language: Telugu

Daiva Balam (transl. God's Grace) is a 1959 Telugu-language swashbuckler film, produced and directed by Ponnaluru Vasanthakumar Reddy. It stars N. T. Rama Rao, Jayasri and features music composed by Ashwatthama. It marked the debut of Shobhan Babu in the film industry. The film is known to be one of the earliest Telugu film containing sequences in Eastmancolor.

== Cast ==
- N. T. Rama Rao as Chandrasenudu
- Jayasri as Rupa
- Shobhan Babu as Enchanter
- Gummadi as Ugrasena
- Relangi as Takku
- Ramana Reddy as Tamaram
- Mukkamala as Kankaksha
- Vangara as astrologer Jaganatha Pandit
- Kasturi Siva Rao as Madhava
- Girija as Champa
- Malathi as Annapurna
- Mohana as Gandharva Rani

== Soundtrack ==
Daiva Balam

Film score by Ashwatthama
- Released: 1959
- Genre: Soundtrack
- Producer: Ashwatthama

Music composed by Ashwatthama.

| S. No. | Song title | Lyrics | Singers | length |
|---|---|---|---|---|
| 1 | "Om Namo Bagavate" | Parasuram | P. B. Srinivas | 2:45 |
| 2 | "Nanda Kishora" | Parasuram | | |
| 3 | "Ae Talli Biddalanu" | Samudrala Sr. | Vaidehi | 3:18 |
| 4 | "Anandamvarinche" | Anishetty | | |
| 5 | "Andaala O Chandamama" | Anishetty | P. B. Srinivas, S. Janaki | 3:26 |
| 6 | "Ninu Variyinchi" | Anishetty | P. B. Srinivas, S. Janaki | 2:43 |
| 7 | "Chiru Chiru Navvula" | Anishetty | | |
| 8 | "Kodite Kottale Kottali" | Kosaraju | Ghantasala | 2:07 |
| 9 | "Jeevitame Ento Hayi" | Anishetty | Vaidehi | 2:38 |
| 10 | "Dum Dum Dummak" | Kosaraju | K. Rani | 2:32 |
| 11 | "Raavamma Kaali" | Parasuram | | |
