= Sobhan Babu =

Indian actor (1937-2008)

- Born: Uppu Sobhana Chalapathi Rao; 14 January 1937; Krishna District, Madras Presidency, British India (now Andhra Pradesh, India)
- Died: 20 March 2008 (aged 71); Chennai, Tamil Nadu, India
- Other name: Natabhushana
- Years active: 1959–1996
- Works: Full list
- Spouse: Santhakumari (m. 1957)
- Children: 4

Uppu Sobhan Babu (born Uppu Sobhana Chalapathi Rao; 14 January 1937 – 20 March 2008) was an Indian actor known for his work in Telugu cinema. He made his film debut in Bhakta Sabari (1959), but Daiva Balam (1959) was his first official release. He garnered four Filmfare Awards South for Best Actor, and Special Mention for Bangaru Panjaram (1969) at the 4th IFFI. Sobhan Babu was featured in National Award winning films such as Sita Rama Kalyanam (1961), Mahamantri Timmarusu (1962), Lava Kusa (1963), Nartanasala (1963), which was featured at the 3rd Afro-Asian Film Festival, and Desamante Manushuloyi (1970). He is often referred to as Nata Bushana.

In a film career spanning more than thirty five years, Sobhan Babu starred in a variety of roles in over 200 feature films such as Veerabhimanyu (1965), Manushulu Marali (1969), Tara Sasankam (1969), Kalyana Mandapam (1971), Chelleli Kapuram (1971), Sampoorna Ramayanam (1972), Sarada (1973), Manchi Manushulu (1974), Jeevana Jyothi (1975), Soggadu (1976), Kurukshetram (1977), Mallepoovu (1978), Gorintaku (1979), Karthika Deepam, (1979), Mosagadu (1980), Devatha (1982), and Mundadugu (1983).

== Background ==
Sobhanbabu was born to Uppu Suryanarayanarao and had four siblings, three sisters, Dhanaranga, Jhansi and Nirmala, and a brother, Sambasivarao. Sobhanbabu completed his initial schooling at Kuntamukkula, Mylavaram. He pursued his Intermediate in Krishna District. He completed B.Sc degree in Physics at Andhra Christian College, Guntur. After that he opted for a Law degree in Madras to pursue his cinema career.

== Personal life ==
Sobhan babu married Santhakumari on May 15, 1958. They had three daughters, and a son Karunasesh. He never introduced his son into film industry and he made him a successful businessman. He enjoyed a peaceful family life. Shoban Babu and KV Chalam were best friends, till KV Chalam's death, after that he shared a close friendship with Chandramohan until his last breath. Actor Murali Mohan followed his suggestions and is well settled. His intimacy with actress Jayalalitha, between 1973 and 1980, had been recorded even by Jayalalitha, in Tamil magazines of that period.

== Death ==
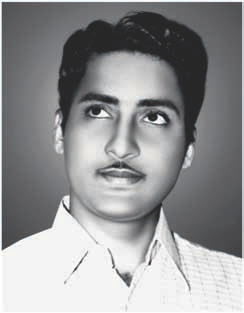
screenshot of Sobhan Babu from a movie scene

Babu died on 20 March 2008, aged 71. Shobanbabu, after completing yoga, he freshened up and sat on his favourite "rocking chair" reading newspaper, waiting for breakfast. Suddenly, he suffered a massive heart attack and fell down from his chair and injured his nose. Immediately, family members rushed him to hospital and he was pronounced dead. Tollywood and Kollywood stars paid homage to him, and the whole film fraternity mourned his death. He was cremated at his farm in chennai.

== Awards ==
Filmfare Awards South

- Filmfare Award for Best Actor – Telugu – Khaidi Babai (1974)
- Filmfare Award for Best Actor – Telugu – Jeevana Jyothi (1975)
- Filmfare Award for Best Actor – Telugu - Soggadu (1976)
- Filmfare Award for Best Actor – Telugu - Karthika Deepam (1979)
