= K. Devi Varaprasad =

Indian film producer (1943–2010)

- Born: Kanakamedala Devi Varaprasad; 6 December 1943; Vijayawada, Andhra Pradesh, India
- Died: 10 December 2010 (aged 67); Hyderabad, Andhra Pradesh, India
- Occupation: Film Producer
- Years active: 1970s–2000s

Kanakamedala Devi Varaprasad (6 December 1943 – 10 December 2010) was an Indian film producer known for his work in Telugu cinema. He produced several successful films under his production banner, Devi Films. Prasad was particularly recognized for his collaborations with actors Chiranjeevi and N. T. Rama Rao. Some of his notable productions include KD No:1 (1978), Naa Desam (1982), Kondaveeti Raja (1986), Gharana Mogudu (1992), and Alluda Majaka (1995).

He also served as a board member of the National Film Development Corporation of India (NFDC), secretary and later president of the South Indian Film Chamber of Commerce, and a trustee of the Telugu Film Producers Council.

== Early life ==
Kanakamedala Devi Varaprasad was born on 6 December 1943 in Vijayawada, Andhra Pradesh. He pursued engineering in Tumkur, Karnataka. His father, Tirupathayya, was a film distributor of National Art Theatre (NAT) banner owned by N. T. Rama Rao and his brother, N. Trivikrama Rao. Tirupathayya distributed films like Thodu Dongalu (1954), Jayasimha (1955), and Panduranga Mahatyam (1957). After his father died, Rama Rao encouraged him to pursue a career in film production.

== Career ==
=== Collaboration with N. T. Rama Rao ===
With N. T. Rama Rao's support, Varaprasad made his debut as a producer with the film Kathanayakuni Katha (1975), starring Rama Rao and Vanisri. The film was successful and marked the beginning of his journey as a film producer. The film was produced under the Tarakarama Films banner rather than Devi Films.

Varaprasad gained prominence by producing K.D. No:1 (1978), a remake of Manoj Kumar's Dus Numbri (1976). Despite the gap between his first film and K.D. No:1, the latter became a hit, further solidifying his standing in Telugu cinema. The film, featuring Jayasudha opposite Rama Rao, was a box office success, especially due to its popular title song. However, his next film, Tiruguleni Manishi (1981), was a failure at the box office, despite its strong cast and story.

In 1982, Varaprasad produced Naa Desam, his final collaboration with Rama Rao before the latter entered politics. This film was a remake of the Amitabh Bachchan-starrer Laawaris (1981) and was completed in a record-breaking 18 days due to Rama Rao’s tight schedule before his political career fully took off. Despite the rushed production, it was a successful release.

=== Collaboration with Chiranjeevi ===
After Rama Rao left the film industry, Varaprasad shifted focus to working with Chiranjeevi, who was rapidly rising as a leading star in Telugu cinema. His first full-fledged collaboration with Chiranjeevi came with Chattamto Poratam (1985), which became a profitable venture.

In 1986, Varaprasad produced Kondaveeti Raja, a film delayed due to an accident involving Chiranjeevi. The film, though planned for Sankranthi, was released later in January and went on to celebrate 100 days in several centres. His next major success was Manchi Donga (1988), which also starred Vijayashanti and Suhasini and became a Sankranthi hit.

Varaprasad's most significant hit came with Gharana Mogudu, a blockbuster starring Chiranjeevi and Nagma. Released in April 1992, Gharana Mogudu became the first South Indian and Telugu film to collect over ₹10 crore in distributor share at the box office. It was a landmark in Chiranjeevi’s career, and Varaprasad became recognized as a star producer. In 1995, Varaprasad produced Alluda Majaka, which created controversies due to its bold content but eventually became a commercial success.

=== Later career and decline ===
In 2001, Varaprasad produced Mrugaraju, directed by Gunasekhar and starring Chiranjeevi. The film, inspired by The Ghost and the Darkness (1996), faced several production issues, including script changes, delays, and unnecessary expenses on foreign locations for song shoots. Ultimately, the film was a critical and commercial failure, marking a major setback in his career. Varaprasad cited the delay in production and increased costs as reasons for the film’s failure.

His final film, Bhajantreelu (2007), also failed to meet expectations, leading to financial losses and his subsequent retirement from active film production. He mentioned that while there were plans to produce more films, none of the scripts met his standards.

=== Industry contributions ===
In addition to his work as a producer, Varaprasad held several significant positions within the Indian film industry. He served as a board member of the National Film Development Corporation (NFDC), secretary, and later president of the South Indian Film Chamber of Commerce. He was also a trustee of the Telugu Film Producers Council. His contributions to the industry extended beyond his films, making him a respected figure in the Telugu cinema landscape.

== Filmography ==
- Kathanayakuni Katha (1975)
- Pamulu Penchina Pasivadu (1976)
- K.D. No:1 (1978)
- Tiruguleni Manishi (1981)
- Naa Desam (1982)
- Chattamtho Poratam (1985)
- Kondaveeti Raja (1986)
- Manchi Donga (1988)
- Bhale Donga (1989)
- Amma Rajinama (1991)
- Gharana Mogudu (1992)
- Aadavallaku Mathrame (1994) (presenter)
- Alluda Majaka (1995)
- Mrugaraju (2001)
- Bhajantreelu (2007) (presenter)

== Death ==
Devi Vara Prasad suffered from liver-related ailments and diabetes. He was admitted to KIMS Hospital, where he died on 10 December 2010.
