= Alluda Majaka =

1995 Indian film by E. V. V. Satyanarayana

Alluda Majaka!
- Theatrical release poster
- Directed by: E. V. V. Satyanarayana
- Written by: Posani Krishna Murali
- Produced by: K. Devi Varaprasad
- Starring: Chiranjeevi; Ramya Krishna; Rambha; Kota Srinivasa Rao; Lakshmi; Ooha; Brahmanandam
- Cinematography: K. S. Hari
- Edited by: Kotagiri Venkateswara Rao
- Music by: Koti
- Production company: Devi Films
- Release date: 25 February 1995
- Country: India
- Language: Telugu

Alluda Majaka! is a 1995 Telugu-language action comedy film directed by E. V. V. Satyanarayana and produced by K. Devi Varaprasad under the Devi Films banner. The film stars Chiranjeevi, Ramya Krishna, and Rambha, with supporting roles played by Lakshmi, Kota Srinivasa Rao, and Ooha. Written by Posani Krishna Murali, the film features music composed by Koti, including the popular chartbuster "Attho Athamma Kuthuro."

The film marked the only collaboration between Chiranjeevi and Satyanarayana. Upon release, it faced controversy over some scenes, leading to protests, and intervention by the Central Board of Film Certification (CBFC). Despite the controversies, Alluda Majaka emerged as a commercial success, becoming the second-highest-grossing Telugu film of 1995 and running for 100 days in 27 centres. The film was later remade in Kannada as Kiladi (2000).

== Plot ==
Sitaram (Chiranjeevi) is the son of the benevolent patriarch of his village who has been the Panchayat President for the past thirty years. Sitaram, his family and the village community are victimized by Vasundhara (Lakshmi) and Peddayya (Kota Srinivasa Rao). Peddayya's NRI son, Siva (Chinna) comes to the village from the United States to see Pappi (Ramya Krishna), the eldest daughter of Vasundhara, and a girl of Peddayya's choice for him to marry, but he decides instead to marry Sitaram's sister, Malleswari (Ooha), a traditional Telugu girl. Peddayya agrees to the marriage after he realises that the ancestral land which Sitaram's father had distributed to the coolies contains priceless granite deposits. He demands the land as dowry days before the proposed marriage. Sitaram's father refuses to take it back from the coolies. Peddayya cancels the marriage. Vasundhara is angered by Siva's choice but dupes the coolies, steals their land and makes a deal with Peddayya. Siva's marriage is fixed with Pappi without his knowledge. Meanwhile, it becomes public knowledge that Malleswari is pregnant (with Siva's child). Sitaram's father kills himself when he realises that the coolies have lost their land. Sitaram and Malleswari move to the city, awaiting Siva's return.

Upon Siva's return, Malleswari is falsely arrested for prostitution before his eyes. Disgusted, Siva rejects her. Sitaram is framed (by Peddayya) in the murder of a police officer and is subsequently sentenced to death. He escapes from custody and forcibly marries Pappi who is all set to marry Siva. With the help of a lawyer, Sivarama Krishna (Giri Babu), the estranged husband of Vasundhara, Sitaram comes out of prison on parole. He is then transformed by his father-in-law into Mr. Toyota, a rich NRI on the lookout for an Indian bride, to teach Vasundhara a lesson and to resolve the multiple crises of the film. After another arrest and dramatic escape from prison, Sitaram defeats the villains and restores order. Finally, Sivarama Krishna and Vasundhara are reunited, Malleswari marries Siva and Sitaram finds himself in a bedroom with Puppy and her younger sister Bobby (Rambha).

== Cast ==
- Chiranjeevi as Sitaramudu/Mr. Toyota/Sukhjinder's father
- Lakshmi as Vasundhara
- Ramya Krishna as Puppy
- Rambha as Bobby
- Ooha as Malleswari
- Kota Srinivasa Rao as Kota Pentayya
- Giri Babu as Lawyer Sivaramakrishna
- Brahmanandam as Abbulu/Ms. Dakota
- Mallikarjuna Rao as Srisailam
- Chinna as Siva
- Srihari as Vasundhara's brother
- Manthena Ramalingaraju as Sitaram's father
- Allu Ramalingaiah as Tata Rao
- A. V. S as Konda Babu/Gundelu Mandela
- Mahesh Anand
- Chalapathi Rao as Chalapathi

== Production ==
=== Development ===
Following the stupendous success of Gharana Mogudu (1992), producer K. Devi Varaprasad announced that he would not produce any film with other actors until he worked with Chiranjeevi again. Despite Chiranjeevi's suggestion to take up other projects during his period of unavailability, Varaprasad remained steadfast and waited two and a half years. This dedication culminated in their collaboration for Alluda Majaka.

The film marked the only collaboration between Chiranjeevi and director E. V. V. Satyanarayana. Satyanarayana was offered the opportunity after a screening of his earlier film Appula Appa Rao (1992), which was attended by Chiranjeevi and Devi Varaprasad. Impressed by Satyanarayana's work, Varaprasad proposed that he direct a high-budget film with Chiranjeevi in the lead. Crafting a script that matched Chiranjeevi's star image proved challenging, and Satyanarayana took two years to finalize the story. Upon its completion, the script, written by Posani Krishna Murali, was narrated to both Chiranjeevi and Devi Varaprasad, who approved it in a single session. During pre-production, the filmmakers considered titles such as Adirindi Alludu and Gharana Atta Gadasari Alludu before finalizing Alluda Majaka to avoid associations with dubbed films.

=== Casting ===
The story of Alluda Majaka revolves around a mischievous son-in-law and his strong-willed mother-in-law. Initially, veteran actress Vanisri, who had previously played a similar role in Attaku Yamudu Ammayiki Mogudu (1989), was considered for the mother-in-law's role. However, due to concerns over a controversial sequence and a dance scene with the hero, Vanisri declined the offer. The role was subsequently offered to Lakshmi, who accepted. Ramya Krishna and Rambha were cast as the female leads, with the film marking Rambha's first collaboration with Chiranjeevi.

=== Filming ===
The production commenced on 26 August 1994, with a launch event held at Sanjeevaiah Park in Hyderabad. N. T. Rama Rao, then leader of the opposition, and a close associate of Devi Varaprasad, attended the event and gave the ceremonial first clap. Several prominent film personalities were present at the launch. The filming was conducted entirely in Madras (now Chennai), a decision influenced by logistical challenges despite tax exemptions being available only for films shot in Andhra Pradesh. The production faced delays when Chiranjeevi sustained an injury during a horse-riding sequence.

== Controversy ==
The film sparked controversy due to scenes deemed objectionable, particularly in their portrayal of women. Communists and Hindu nationalists demanded a ban, prompting the Central Board of Film Certification (CBFC) to consider recalling the film two months after its release. However, protests by Chiranjeevi's fans led the CBFC to edit out the controversial parts instead of banning the film. Despite the issues, the film was a box-office success.

== Music ==
Music for the film was composed by Koti. The song Atho Athamma Kuthuro became an instant chartbuster. The song was remixed in the 2012 comedy - fantasy film Yamudiki Mogudu. The overture of King Gizzard & the Lizard Wizard song "Alluda Majaka", opening their Oddments album, samples a portion of the film, at around the 8:30 mark.

Telugu Track list
No.	Title	Lyrics	Singer(s)	Length
1.	"Chinna Papa"	Bhuvana Chandra	S. P. Balasubrahmanyam, K. S. Chithra	4:28
2.	"Atto Attamma"	Veturi	S. P. Balasubrahmanyam, K. S. Chithra	4:33
3.	"Unga Unga"	Veturi	S. P. Balasubrahmanyam, Sujatha	4:44
4.	"Maa Voori Devudu"	Veturi	S. P. Balasubrahmanyam	6:54
5.	"Pitta Kootha"	Bhuvana Chandra	S. P. Balasubrahmanyam, K. S. Chithra	4:56
6.	"Reddu Reddu"	Veturi	S. P. Balasubrahmanyam, K. S. Chithra	4:32
Total length:				30:09

All lyrics are written by Maruthamalai.

Tamil Track list
No.	Title	Singer(s)	Length
1.	"Rendu Rendu Kannal"	Mano, K. S. Chithra	4:34
2.	"Pettai Kozhi"	Mano, K. S. Chithra	4:57
3.	"Unakka Unakka"	Mano, K. S. Chithra	4:34
4.	"Chinna Ponnu"	Mano, K. S. Chithra	4:01
5.	"Athaikku Magalo"	Mano, K. S. Chithra	4:31
Total length:			21:57

== Box office ==
Initially slated for release during Sankranti, the film was postponed to Maha Sivaratri and released on 25 February 1995. Despite the controversies, Alluda Majaka was a commercial success. The film opened with 120 prints and collected a gross of nearly ₹3.56 crore in its opening week. It ran for 50 days in 75 centres and completed 100 days in 27 centres, ultimately grossing around ₹9 crore. It became the second-highest-grossing Telugu film of 1995.
