= Mrugaraju =

2001 Telugu film by Gunasekhar

- Poster
- Directed by: Gunasekhar
- Written by: Screenplay: Gunasekhar; Story: Devi Film Productions; Dialogues: Satyanand
- Produced by: K. Devi Varaprasad
- Starring: Chiranjeevi; Simran; Sanghavi; Nagendra Babu
- Cinematography: Sekhar V. Joseph
- Edited by: Kotagiri Venkateswara Rao
- Music by: Mani Sharma
- Distributed by: Devi Film Productions
- Release date: 11 January 2001
- Running time: 147 minutes
- Country: India
- Language: Telugu

Mrugaraju (transl. King of the beasts) is a 2001 Indian Telugu-language action adventure film directed by Gunasekhar. The film stars Chiranjeevi, with supporting roles played by Simran, Sanghavi and Nagendra Babu. The music was composed by Mani Sharma.

Mrugaraju received negative reviews. The film also became a box-office bomb. The core plot is based on the 1996 American film The Ghost and the Darkness. It was dubbed into Tamil as Vettaikaran and in Hindi as Rakshak - The Protector.

== Plot ==
In the jungle surrounding the village of Adavipalli, a government project is underway to construct a railway bridge to facilitate the transport of goods, as the area is rich in ores and located between two hills. However, the construction is hindered by a man-eating lion, which has recently claimed the life of the chief engineer. The railway department assigns Aishwarya (Simran) to lead the project and resume the construction. Despite her efforts, the lion continues to terrorize the workers.

Raju (Chiranjeevi), a renowned hunter from Adavipalli, is brought in to eliminate the threat. In the first half, Raju successfully traps and kills the lion, but this comes at the cost of his friend Appanna Dora (Nagendra Babu). However, the second lion in the jungle, enraged by the death of its companion, starts causing further destruction. Additionally, Raju faces trouble from a corrupt forest ranger (Surya) and a local smuggler (Ramireddy), both of whom he defeats by the interval.

It is then revealed that Aishwarya is Raju's estranged wife. In a flashback, Raju, while participating in a crafts fair in the city to sell jungle herbs, meets Aishwarya, who is engaged to Vicky (Raja Ravindra). After helping Aishwarya win a shooting game at the fair, she invites him to her engagement. At the event, Raju witnesses Vicky flirting with another woman and confronts him about his behavior, which Aishwarya observes. She decides to break off her engagement and marries Raju, believing him to be a better man.

However, Aishwarya's father creates misunderstandings that lead to their separation. During this time, Aishwarya discovers she is pregnant and gives birth to a daughter. When Raju learns of his daughter, he is overjoyed, but Aishwarya keeps the child away from him and his parents. One night, the lion returns and attacks, but Raju's parents save their granddaughter, sacrificing their lives. Before dying, they reveal the truth about Aishwarya's father's deceit.

The next morning, the workers abandon the project. Raju and Aishwarya search for their lost daughter in the forest and find her standing in front of the man-eating lion. Raju kills the lion, saving his daughter, and the family is reunited.

== Cast ==
- Chiranjeevi as Raju
- Simran as Aishwarya
- Sanghavi as Sivangi
- Nagendra Babu as Appanna Dora
- Brahmanandam as Ibraheem
- Prakash Raj as Valmiki Dora
- Surya as Forest Ranger
- Rami Reddy as Smuggler
- Raja Ravindra as Vicky
- Chalapathi Rao
- Gundu Hanumantha Rao
- L. B. Sriram
- Kovai Sarala
- Vijayakumar
- M. S. Narayana
- Kallu Chidambaram
- Niharika
- Rambha in Guest role in the song "Ramayya Padaletti"

== Production ==
The core plot of Mrugaraju was inspired by the 1996 American film The Ghost and the Darkness. Initially, Jayanth C. Paranjee was brought on board to direct the film for Devi Films in December 1998. Jayanth conceptualized the backdrop for the project but was later reassigned to direct Ravoyi Chandamama (1999) for Vyjayanthi Movies. As a result, Gunasekhar was brought in to helm Mrugaraju. Nagendra Babu contributed to the development of the storyline, while writers Yandamuri Veerendranath and Satyanand worked on the script in consultation with Gunasekhar and lead actor Chiranjeevi. A flashback storyline was incorporated into the script to enhance its emotional depth and appeal.

The film was produced by K. Devi Varaprasad under the Devi Films banner, with a budget of ₹15 crore. Extensive resources were allocated to create a high-budget production. For instance, ₹75 lakh was spent on a single set for a song sequence, and another ₹30 lakh was spent to recreate Amsterdam city at Annapurna Studios. Several scenes featuring the lion were shot in South Africa, with Pentamedia Graphics contributing to the visual effects. The forest scenes were shot at Talakona in India and at Johannesburg in South Africa, and the scenes where Chiranjeevi's character experiencing life in city was shot at Film City in Hyderabad.

== Music ==
Mrugaraju

Soundtrack album by Mani Sharma
- Genre: Film soundtrack
- Length: 34:11
- Producer: Mani Sharma

The soundtrack of the film was composed by Mani Sharma. The album consists of six songs. Lyrics for the three songs were penned by Veturi and the remaining three songs were written by Chandrabose, Kulasekhar and Bhuvanachandra.

Tracklist
No.	Title	Lyrics	Singer(s)	Length
1.	"Ramayya Padaletti"	Veturi	Shankar Mahadevan	6:00
2.	"Aley ley Aley ley"	Veturi	Udit Narayan, S. P. Sailaja	5:36
3.	"Sathamanamannadiley"	Veturi	Hariharan, Sadhana Sargam	5:38
4.	"Chai Chai"	Chandrabose	Chiranjeevi	6:00
5.	"Hangama Hangama"	Kulasekhar	Raghu Kunche, K. S. Chithra	5:29
6.	"Dammentho"	Bhuvanachandra	Sukhwinder Singh, Swarnalatha	5:28
Total length:				34:11

== Critical reception ==
Full Hyderabad wrote, "Save for the phenomenal photography, there is nothing new about the film. Except for the part of Chiranjeevi trying to tame the lions, which has been photographed wonderfully, the story is quite contrived. What keeps the film afloat is the adventure drama, but unfortunately the director decides to sink his ship with a flashback that doesn't seem to end, contributing to tears and heartache." Idlebrain wrote, "As story is plain and simple, a lot would depend upon screenplay to make the film gripping and interesting. But Guna Sekhar failed to stitch the scenes in perfect manner. And he tried to ape the original film in most of the scenes, which resulted in poor copying as we lack the special FX finesse the Hollywood boast of". Telugu Cinema wrote "[..] It's a bad imitation to the Oscar winning English film Ghost in the Darkness. Stuffed and spiced with Telugu film masala the film fails to impress and instead it takes on nerves". Indiainfo wrote "Both Chiranjeevi and Simran are good but the lion has stolen the show with its gracious presence. And in fact, it is the only saving grace of the movie. On the whole, the movie is a "time killer".
