= Bhuvana Chandra =

Indian lyricist

- Born: 17 August 1950 (age 76); Gullapudi, Krishna district, Andhra Pradesh, India
- Occupation: Lyricist
- Spouse: Sesha Samrajya Lakshmi

Bhuvana Chandra is an Indian lyricist, renowned for his work in the Telugu cinema. He served in the Indian Air Force for 18 years before turning into a lyricist. He penned lyrics for more than 2000 songs. He also wrote more than 100 stories, a novel, and many articles in magazines. He participated as a judge in some reality shows. He also acted in the film Welcome Obama directed by Singeetam Srinivasa Rao.

== Personal life ==
Bhuvana Chandra was born in Gullapudi, Krishna district and brought up in Chintalapudi, West Godavari district of Andhra Pradesh. He used to frequent the library and read a lot of books since his childhood. He learned Typing, and Shorthand and held tuition for students to make a living. Along with a friend, he went for the selections of Indian Air Force and got selected. His first posting was in Delhi. He served in the Indian Air Force and took voluntary retirement before turning into a lyricist. He participated in the Indo-Pakistan war in 1971 and received 4 medals.

== Career ==
With the help of writer Tenneti Hemalatha, he met film directors Jandhyala, and Relangi Narasimha Rao. They wanted to talk to him later. With the help of another friend, he met film maker Vijaya Bapineedu. He challenged him to write lyrics for a situation and impress him, which he successfully completed. He made his debut as a lyricist with Vijaya Bapineedu's film Naku Pellam Kavali.

Later he wrote all the songs for Vijaya Bapineedu's next film Maa Inti Maharaju. Then he wrote three songs for Khaidi No. 786 which got him good recognition. Guvva Gorinkatho song from this movie became a big hit. The songs in the block buster film Gang Leader also got good fame.

== Discography ==
=== As lyricist for straight films ===
| Year | Movie | Music Director | Song(s) | Ref(s) |
|---|---|---|---|---|
| 1987 | Naaku Pellam Kaavali | Saluri Vasu Rao | "Vinodaala Vindu Raa", "Chilakaa Chilakaa" | |
| 1988 | Maa Inti Maharaju | Saluri Vasu Rao | "Andaala Harivillu Maa Bommarillu", "Kasirikotti Pommannaa", "Otti Maayamaatalaadi", "Eeshwaraa Parameshwaraa" | |
| 1988 | Khaidi No. 786 | Raj–Koti | "Guvvaa Gorinka Tho", "Atu Amalapuram", "Gundammaa Bandi Digi Raavammaa" | |
| 1988 | Prana Snehithulu | Raj–Koti | "Kanchu Kanchu", "Snehaanikanna Minna", "Mudduku Haddulu", "Mithramaa Mithramaa", "Bhuvanam Gaganam" | |
| 1988 | Maharajasri Mayagadu | Raj–Koti | "Satyabhaamalaa" | |
| 1988 | Donga Kollu | Saluri Vasu Rao | "Yemani Vivarinchanu", "Ravoyi Maa Intiki" | |
| 1989 | Attaku Yamudu Ammayiki Mogudu | K. Chakravarthy | "Merupulaa Laa Laa" | |
| 1989 | Sumangali | Saluri Vasu Rao | "Sweet Muddu Hot Muddu", "Jeevitham O Prayaanam Thodugaa Saagani (Version 1)", "Jeevitham O Prayaanam Thodugaa Saagani (Version 2)", "Mundarikocchi Bandaru Laddu Tinipisthaavaa" | |
| 1989 | Zoo Laka Taka | Saluri Vasu Rao | "Ek Do Teen", "Gudivaada Station", "Lailaaki Majnuki" | |
| 1990 | Alajadi | Vidyasagar | "Nesthamaa Anantha Yaathralo", "Premaa Rammante Raadhu Prema" | |
| 1990 | Yamadharmaraju | Raj–Koti | "Mudduku Haddulu Leve" | |
| 1991 | Kadapa Reddamma | Vidyasagar | "Hello Vijji" | |
| 1991 | Teneteega | Vidyasagar | "Muddul Kavalena", "A Ante Amala" | |
| 1991 | Gang Leader | Bappi Lahiri | "Bhadrachalam Konda", "Paapa Rita", "Sunday Ananuraa Monday Ananuraa", "Vaana Vaana Velluvaaye" | |
| 1992 | Appula Apparao | Rajan–Nagendra | "Moodo Debba Kottaaka", "Tholi Nightu" | |
| 1992 | Chinarayudu | Ilaiyaraaja | "Kanti Choopu Chaalunayya", "Chitti Chitti Neepaitakonchem", "Bullipitta Bujjipitta - 1", "Swathimutyamaala", "Nindu Aakashamantha Manasu", "Bullipitta Bujjipitta - 2", "Nindu Aakashamantha Manasu (Female)", "Cheppalanundi Sundari" | |
| 1992 | Peddarikam | Raj–Koti | "Priyathama Priyathama", "Idele Tharatharala", "Idele Tharatharala (Duet)", "Nee Navve Chaalu" | |
| 1992 | Seetharatnam Gari Abbayi | Raj–Koti | "Meghama Maruvake", "Mattuga Gammattuga", "Aa Paapi Kondallo" | |
| 1992 | Subbaraayudi Pelli | Vasu Rao | "Ayyo Rayyo Rabba" | |
| 1992 | Gharana Mogudu | M. M. Keeravani | "Bangaru Kodi Petta", "Pandu Pandu Pandu", "Hey Pilla Hello Pilla", "Eandibe Ettaaga Undi", "Kitukulu Thelisina" | |
| 1992 | Aapadbandhavudu | M. M. Keeravani | "Odiyappa" | |
| 1992 | Rowdy Inspector | Bappi Lahiri | "Dikki Dikki Deedikki", "Chitapata Chinukulu", "Arey O Samba", "Takku Tamaram Bandi", "Neelala Ningi Needallo", "O Papayo" | |
| 1992 | Mondi Mogudu Penki Pellam | M. M. Keeravani | "Chaligaa Vunte", "Ardharaathirela" | |
| 1992 | Soorigadu | Saluri Vasu Rao | "Aasha-Oke Oka Aasha", "Amma Laalo Amma Laalo", "Oopedi Evvaraina", "Kottindammo Kottindammo" | |
| 1992 | Seetapathi Chalo Thirupathi | K. Chakravarthy | "Konangi Aina", "Molle Mogga", "Asalu Sisalu", "Chik Chik Luck", "Pampu Kaada" | |
| 1992 | Karuninchina Kanaka Durga | Raj–Koti | "Nela Raja Nela Raja", "Havvare Havvare" | |
| 1992 | Allari Mogudu | M. M. Keeravani | "Abba Nanagunna" | |
| 1993 | Mechanic Alludu | Raj–Koti | "Chekka Chekka Chemma Chekka", "Gunthalakkadi Gundamma", "Guruvaa Guruvaa", "Jummane Tummeda Veta", "Premisthe Pranamistha" | |
| 1993 | Allari Priyudu | M. M. Keeravani | "Cheppakane Cheputunnadi" | |
| 1993 | Jamba Lakidi Pamba | Raj–Koti | "Kanaraa Vinaraa", "Madanaa Thagunaa", "Nene Superman", "Niluvara Valukanula Vaada", "Yamma Yamma" | |
| 1993 | Mutha Mestri | Raj–Koti | "Chikchik Cham" | |
| 1993 | Bangaru Bullodu | Raj–Koti | "Gudivaada Gummaro", "Thathiginathom" | |
| 1993 | Bava Bavamaridhi | Raj–Koti | "Kontekonangi" | |
| 1993 | Rajendrudu Gajendrudu | S. V. Krishna Reddy | "Deelaiko Vango", "Raajaya Namaha", "Kukoo Kukoo" | |
| 1993 | Abbayigaru | M. M. Keeravani | "Vennelaki Yem Telisu", "Koosindi Koyelamma", "Tadikenduku Adirindi" | |
| 1993 | Kondapalli Raja | M. M. Keeravani | "Kondapalli Raja", "Guvvamgudugudu" | |
| 1993 | Donga Alludu | Raj–Koti | "Nee Konguchatu" | |
| 1993 | Mayalodu | S. V. Krishna Reddy | "Chalaki Chilipi Vayasu" | |
| 1993 | Varasudu | M. M. Keeravani | "Dheem Thanaka Dheem", "Silaka Laaga", "Danger Yama Danger" | |
| 1993 | Evandi Aavida Vachindi | Raj–Koti | "Guchhi Guchhi Choodakura", "Bhama Bhama Paduchu Reyi", "Oh Priya Priya", "Ganganu Chooste", "Hattukomannadi Bhama" | |
| 1993 | Nakshatra Poratam | Raj–Koti | "Oh Priya Priya", "Nee Illu Bangaram", "Patta Pagale", "Eedochhi Paddadi", "Muthyala Chemmachekka" | |
| 1993 | Brahmachari Mogudu | J. V. Raghavulu | "Chivurakula Lona", "Kaamuni Patnam", "Pattanu Guru", "Kashmora Kaskora", "Aha Mukhyala" | |
| 1993 | Aa Okkati Adakku | Ilaiyaraaja | "Paavurama Paavurama", "Ankulu Digirave" | |
| 1993 | Ratha Sarathi | Raj–Koti | "Tapu Tapu Tapankuti" | |
| 1993 | Alibaba Aradajan Dongalu | Vidyasagar | "Yerra Buggalu Chusuko", "Baba Baba", "Rambha Naaku Peddappaa", "Kassu Kassu Mannadhi", "Nee Paita Jaripothe" | |
| 1993 | Anna Chellelu | Saluri Vasu Rao | "Raarambhola" | |
| 1993 | Inspector Ashwani | Sri | "Navvindiro", "Love Latapitalo" | |
| 1993 | Aarambam | Sri | "Katta Thellacheera", "Pilla Puttindhi" | |
| 1993 | Rowdy Gari Teacher | Sri | "Kottaiyya Loveganta" | |
| 1993 | Paruvu Prathishta | Raj–Koti | "Paara Hushaar" | |
| 1993 | Dhaadi | Manoj | "Buddham Saranam Gachhami", "Vayasu Vacherayyo", "Mamatala Vodilo", "Telu Kuttindi", "Thulli Thulli Poye" | |
| 1994 | Mugguru Monagallu | Vidyasagar | "Kottu Kottu Kobbarikaya", "Aaja Aaja", "Chamanthi Puvva Puvva", "Nuvvokkasari Ante Okays", "Rara Swamy Rara" | |
| 1994 | Hello Brother | Raj–Koti | "Priya Raagale", "Kannepettaro Kannu Kottaro" | |
| 1994 | Hello Alludu | Raj–Koti | "Enti Pilla" | |
| 1994 | Doragaariki Donga Pellam | Raj–Koti | "Kondapalli Jatharalo" | |
| 1994 | Aame | Vidyasagar | "Uhala Pallaki", "Ammammammamma", "Nagamani Nagamani", "Challagaliki", "O Challagali" | |
| 1994 | Number One | S. V. Krishna Reddy | "Vayyari Bhama" | |
| 1994 | Khaidi Number One | M. M. Keeravaani | "Paitenaka Eamundammo", "Raajuvi Guru", "Koosindi Kannekodi", "Raajuvi Guru - 2" | |
| 1994 | Allarodu | Vidyasagar | "Mee Amma", "Saarango Sriranga", "Vaakitlo Chali Chali", "Aa Gadhi", "Teacher Teacher" | |
| 1994 | Maa Voori Maaraju | Raj–Koti | "Edem Daruvuroi" | |
| 1994 | Yamaleela | S. V. Krishna Reddy | "A...Ni Jeenu Pantu Choosi Bullemmoy" | |
| 1994 | Madam | Madhavapeddi Suresh | "Mahila Ika", "Naa Valla Kaadu", "Singudaama" | |
| 1994 | Nannagaru | M. M. Srilekha | "Chukka Chukka", "Oke Oka" | |
| 1994 | Police Alludu | Saluri Vasu Rao | "Mangalyam Tantuna", "Dingu Dingu Dikkaa", "Pala Konda" | |
| 1994 | Andaru Andare | Raj–Koti | "Time Pasuke", "Aaku Poka", "Nee Kosam", "Jummandi Prema", "A.P.S.R.T.C. Busandol" | |
| 1994 | Kishkinda Kanda | M. M. Keeravaani | "Kokethu Kelite" | |
| 1994 | Neeku 16 Naaku 18 | Vamsy | "Ee Dhaham", "Guttuga Pitta", "Leke Pehla Pehla Pyar", "Navvante Jaabilli", "Preminchey Nirantharam", "Sloka", "Veechi Veechi" | |
| 1995 | Raja Simham | Raj–Koti | "Ammaye Kallu" | |
| 1995 | Alluda Mazaka | Koti | "Chinna Papa", "Pitta Kootha" | |
| 1995 | Pedarayudu | Koti | "Koo Annadoye", "Aba Dani Soku", "Baavavi Nuuvu" | |
| 1995 | Bhale Bullodu | Koti | "Muddu Mudduga", "Chinadhani Cheerachoodu" | |
| 1995 | Sankalpam | Koti | "Achchatlo Muchchat", "Methaga Hathuko", "Dheethanakku Thalam" | |
| 1995 | Tajmahal | M. M. Srilekha | "Saagpoye Neeli Megham" | |
| 1995 | Maatho Pettukoku | Madhavapeddi Suresh | "Lachimee Lachimee" | |
| 1995 | Bhale Bullodu | Koti | "Muddu Mudduga", "Chinadhani Cheerachoodu" | |
| 1995 | Ghatothkachudu | S. V. Krishna Reddy | "Ja Jja Jja Roja" | |
| 1995 | Bala Raju Bangaru Pellam | M. M. Keeravani | "Papadi Pandommidi", "Tadika Tadika" | |
| 1995 | Dorababu | Koti | "Chinadhani Cheeralo" | |
| 1995 | Chilaka Paccha Kapuram | Vidyasagar | "Kittayo Kittayo" | |
| 1995 | Vetagadu | Vidyasagar | "Andala Tene Kallu", "Yennenno Paatalu", "Ammayee Kanabadagane", "Nilavadu Pranam", "O Jabilee Jabilee" | |
| 1995 | Super Mogudu | Koti | "Allari Buggaku" | |
| 1995 | Sogasu Chooda Tarama | Bharadwaj | "Orayyo Yendammo" | |
| 1995 | Kondapalli Rathaiah | M. M. Srilekha | "Rajo Rajo", "Nishida Samayamulo", "Jivvu Jivvu", "Ninnu Choosi" | |
| 1995 | Subhamasthu | Koti | "Go Go Go Gopala" | |
| 1995 | Top Lechipoddi | Koti | "Jobeda Ko Ka", "Kassumandi", "Kottindi Pilla", "Gudu Gudu Gumpa", "Jam Bugga" | |
| 1995 | Real Hero | M. M. Keeravani | "Pachipokiri" | |
| 1995 | Rikshavodu | Koti | "Ne Petta", "Ardha Rathri" | |
| 1995 | Big Boss | Bappi Lahiri, Saluri Vasu Rao | "Koosethunnade Kurrodu", "Maava Maava", "No-1 No-2 No-3", "Urumochesindoi", "Neelati Revulona", (Note: This song is composed by Saluri Vasu Rao) "Soodiki Daaram" | |
| 1996 | Maavi Chiguru | S. V. Krishna Reddy | "Kommana Kulike Koyile", "Kondamalli Kondaamalli" | |
| 1996 | Vamsaniki Okkadu | Koti | "Dandalo Dandamandi" | |
| 1996 | Sahasa Veerudu Sagara Kanya | M. M. Keeravani | "Abbabbo Abbabbo", "Ghadiya Ghadiyakomuddu" | |
| 1996 | Sarada Bullodu | Koti | "Chitha Karthelo Chinukulu Chitapata", "Naatu Kodi Pettoyamma" | |
| 1996 | Vajram | S. V. Krishna Reddy | "Ganpalo Kondentha", "Avva Kavala Buvva Kavala", "Pellidu Kocchindhi Pilla" | |
| 1996 | Vinodam | S. V. Krishna Reddy | "Chalaaki Kaluva Kaluva" | |
| 1996 | Jaabilamma Pelli | M. M. Keeravani | "Boddupai Vaddanam" | |
| 1996 | Pavitra Bandham | M. M. Keeravani | "Chali Kodtandi", "Paatante Paata Kaadu" | |
| 1996 | Maa Aavida Collector | Vandemataram Srinivas | "Naa Kodi Kootha" | |
| 1996 | Prema Prayanam | Raaj | "Ayya Baboi Chumma", "Chitti Paapalu", "Vayasa Vayasa" | |
| 1996 | Akka Bagunnava | Koti | "Aalesha Deko Pyaree", "Abbo Pillagade" | |
| 1996 | Kranthi | Raj | "Soniya" | |
| 1996 | Hello Mogudu Bhale Pellam | Koti | "Chikkadamma Ivvala Naaku", "Oodade Oodade Nagaswaram", "Twinkil Twinkil Little Star", "Ososi Bandaraladdu", "Oka Poove Naadai", "Nidura Leche Vayase Vayase" | |
| 1996 | Soggadi Pellam | Koti | "Sankranthi", "Satya Bhama", "Takkari" | |
| 1997 | Abbaigari Pelli | Koti | "Pattemanchama" | |
| 1997 | Subhakankshalu | S. A. Rajkumar | "O Pori Paani" | |
| 1997 | Muddula Mogudu | Koti | "Maina Maina" | |
| 1997 | Egire Paavurama | S. V. Krishna Reddy | "Runaa Laila Vanalaga", "This Is The Rhythm" | |
| 1997 | Pelli Chesukundam | Koti | "O Laila" | |
| 1997 | Dongaata | Bharadwaj | "Oh Chilaka Raa Chilaka", "Oh Priya Edi O Thamasha" | |
| 1997 | Collector Garu | Koti | "Boddu Kindha Cheera Katti" | |
| 1997 | Aahwanam | S. V. Krishna Reddy | "Minsare Minsare" | |
| 1997 | Ugadi | S. V. Krishna Reddy | "Choosa Oka Maru", "Brathukaina", "Magic Of The Music" | |
| 1997 | Maa Aayana Bangaram | Vandemataram Srinivas | "Chummare Chumma", "Vennela Vennela" | |
| 1997 | Super Heroes | Mani Sharma | "Jeansvesi Dance Cheyara" | |
| 1997 | Oka Chinna Maata | Bharadwaj | "Oh Manasa Thondara", "Mummu Mummu Muddistha" | |
| 1997 | Chelikaadu | S. A. Rajkumar | "Fair & Lovely", "Medisi Padake" | |
| 1997 | Aaro Pranam | K. Veeru | "Makhana Makhana" | |
| 1997 | Omkaram | Hamsalekha | "College Kurrodu", "Dilruba Dilruba", "O Gulabi O Gulabi" | |
| 1997 | Chinnabbayi | Ilaiyaraaja | "Jaji Malli Tella Cheera" | |
| 1997 | Rowdy Darbar | Vandemataram Srinivas | "Mallepoovva Mallepoovva" | |
| 1997 | Chilakkottudu | Koti | "Andame Andamaa", "Nacchade Roudi Pilladu" | |
| 1997 | Priya O Priya | Koti | "Kammani Kalalaku (Priya O Priya)" | |
| 1997 | Hitler | Koti | "Koosindi" | |
| 1997 | Devudu | Sirpi | "Made In India" | |
| 1997 | Jai Bhajarangabhali | Koti | "Nee Lifstick Pedavulu" | |
| 1997 | Priyamaina Srivaaru | Vandemataram Srinivas | "Bhangu Bhangada", "Mavayyo Mavayyo", "Thiyyani Kala" | |
| 1997 | Surya Putrulu | M. M. Keeravani | "Chakkani Vennela" | |
| 1997 | Adirindi Guru | Koti | "Ammo Kiladivaade", "Gilli Gilli", "Chumma Chumma", "Mandapeta Maradhala", "Thummedhavalindiro" | |
| 1997 | Peddannayya | Koti | "Chikkindhi Chemanthi" | |
| 1997 | Pelli Pandiri | Vandemataram Srinivas | "Chooda Chakkani" | |
| 1997 | Preminchukundam Raa | Mahesh | "Surya Kireetame", "Sambaraala" | |
| 1998 | Tholi Prema | Deva | "Emi Sodhara", "Romance Rhythms" | |
| 1998 | Pavitra Prema | Koti | "O Ranga Sri Ranga", "Jing Chekka" | |
| 1998 | Suswagatham | S. A. Rajkumar | "Figaru Maata" | |
| 1998 | Suryudu | Vandemataram Srinivas | "Selayetiki" | |
| 1998 | Ganesh | Mani Sharma | "Aadabarse" | |
| 1998 | Aayanaki Iddaru | Koti | "Arere Ree Kothaga", "Madhu Masapu", "O Naa Chandramukhi", "O Laila Laila" | |
| 1998 | Suryavamsam | S. A. Rajkumar | "Jhalaku Jhalaku" | |
| 1998 | Ooyala | S. V. Krishna Reddy | "Nagamalli Konallo" | |
| 1998 | Subhalekhalu | Koti | "Lipstick Pedala" | |
| 1998 | Kanyadhanam | Koti | "Ayyayyo Ayyayyo", "Singapur Singarale" | |
| 1998 | Greeku Veerudu | Deva | "Allah Allah", "Sakuntalo", "Jum Jumre", "New Genaration", "Bapu Geesina" | |
| 1998 | Sreevarante Mavare | Koti | "Haiyare Haiyare" | |
| 1999 | Samarasimha Reddy | Mani Sharma | "Nandamoori Nayaka", "Lady Lady", "Chaliga Undannadey" | |
| 1999 | Seenu | Mani Sharma | "Aatakundo Time" | |
| 1999 | Sultaan | Koti | "Cheema Cheema" | |
| 1999 | Sneham Kosam | S. A. Rajkumar | "Janaku Jana" | |
| 1999 | Preminchedi Endukamma | Ilaiyaraaja | "O Baby Baby", "Chintalapoodi" | |
| 1999 | Swayamvaram | Vandemataram Srinivas | "Yara Ra Roi", "Keeravaani", "Vinave Cheli", "Pikaso Chitrama", "Marala Telupuna", "Pellichesukora" | |
| 1999 | Maa Balaji | Vandemataram Srinivas | "Niligaganamlo", "Gappchipproy" | |
| 1999 | Bobbili Vamsam | M. M. Srilekha | "Hello Antu", "Mudu Muddandi", "Mandapetalo" | |
| 2000 | Vamsoddharakudu | Koti | "Dole Dole Dolak", "Budi Budi Chinukula Vaana" | |
| 2000 | Maavidakulu | Koti | "Preminchu Priya" | |
| 2000 | Chiru Navvutho | Mani Sharma | "Hoyyare Hoyyare", "Kanulu Kalisayi", "Andam Nee Pera", "Sonare So Sonare" | |
| 2000 | Goppinti Alludu | Koti | "Premiste Ento Greatu", "Nee Haitu India Getu", "Ammagariki Pessarattu" | |
| 2000 | Ravanna | S. A. Rajkumar | "Aadi Soma" | |
| 2000 | Maa Annayya | S. A. Rajkumar | "Pilla Bale" | |
| 2000 | Chala Bagundi | Koti | "Dhaham Dhaham Dhaham", "Entha Baagundi Baasu E Figure" | |
| 2000 | Maa Pelliki Randi | S. A. Rajkumar | "Hello Chalaki Chilakamma" | |
| 2000 | Ammo Okato Thareeku | Vandemataram Srinivas | "Nee Aakupacha Cheera", "Preyasi I Love You" | |
| 2000 | Nuvve Kavali | Koti | "Sukriya Sukriya", "Ammammalu Thathayyalu", "Ole Ole Ole" | |
| 2000 | Kauravudu | Mani Sharma | "Dingudongu" | |
| 2000 | Okkadu Chaalu | Koti | "Hangaamare Hangamaare" | |
| 2000 | Ninnu Chusaka | S. A. Rajkumar | "Gaali Vaanai Dollarlu" | |
| 2000 | Annayya | Mani Sharma | "Aatakaavaala Paatakaavala" | |
| 2001 | Daddy | S. A. Rajkumar | "Patta Pakkinti" | |
| 2001 | Narasimha Naidu | Mani Sharma | "Ninna Kuttesi", "Chilaka Pacha Koka", "Lux Papa" | |
| 2001 | Sri Manjunatha | Hamsalekha | "Oho Garala Kantta" | |
| 2001 | Mrugaraju | Mani Sharma | "Dammentho" | |
| 2001 | Priyamaina Neeku | Siva Shankar | "Mastu Mastu" | |
| 2001 | Bhalevadivi Basu | Mani Sharma | "Rayyi Rayyi Rayyi Manta", "Ku Ku Ku Ante", "Ammamo Brahma" | |
| 2001 | Kalisi Naduddam | S. A. Rajkumar | "Jil Jil Jil Jil" | |
| 2001 | Jabili | S. V. Krishna Reddy | "Idi Acchamaina Telugu" | |
| 2001 | Akka Bavekkada | S. A. Rajkumar | "Muddu Meda Muddu", "Hysalakka", "Ekkada Ekkada", "Mehabooba Mehabooba" | |
| 2001 | Ammayi Kosam | Vandemataram Srinivas | "Anjali" | |
| 2001 | Cheppalani Undi | Mani Sharma | "Mapatelakostava" | |
| 2001 | Prema Sandadi | Koti | "Seenugaadi", "Chalo Chalo" | |
| 2002 | Indra | Mani Sharma | "Radhe Govinda" | |
| 2002 | Aadi | Mani Sharma | "Ayyo Rama" | |
| 2002 | Manmadhudu | Devi Sri Prasad | "Andhamyna Bhamalu" | |
| 2002 | Takkari Donga | Mani Sharma | "Aleba Aleba" | |
| 2002 | Seema Simham | Mani Sharma | "Rendujella Papa" | |
| 2002 | Nee Premakai | S. A. Rajkumar | "Mandakini" | |
| 2002 | Trinetram | Vandemataram Srinivas | "Tayyaku Taa Dimita", "Cheera Kavala Pilla Gare Kavala", "Ulliporala Naa Cheera" | |
| 2002 | Neetho Cheppalani | Koti | "Oh Missu Oh Vacchindi" | |
| 2002 | Tappu Chesi Pappu Koodu | M. M. Keeravani | "Yaa Alla Hare Krishna" | |
| 2002 | Sandade Sandadi | Koti | "Sandade Sandadi" | |
| 2002 | Malli Malli Choodali | Yuvan Shankar Raja | "Teenage Paparo", "Viskylo", "Vennello" | |
| 2002 | Raghava | Shashi Preetam | "Prema Prema" | |
| 2003 | Palanati Brahmanaidu | Mani Sharma | "Brindavanamlo", "Oososi Poolateega", "Sarasala Sundarayya", "Palaka Balapam" | |
| 2003 | Tagore | Mani Sharma | "Vanochhenante" | |
| 2003 | Pellam Oorelthe | Mani Sharma | "Jhoom Sharabari" | |
| 2003 | Neeke Manasichaanu | Sri | "Mehabooba" | |
| 2003 | Vishnu | Ismail Darbar | "Vandanam" | |
| 2003 | Chantigadu | Vandemataram Srinivas | "Chirugalilaa", "Love Me Love Me", "Swathi Muthyamy" | |
| 2003 | Anaganaga O Kurraadu | Chakri | "Vijayam Mana Sontham" | |
| 2003 | Missamma | Vandemataram Srinivas | "Ne Padithey", "Entha Sukhmido" | |
| 2003 | Oka Radha Iddaru Krishnulu Pelli | Chakri | "Lovvu Dhoma" | |
| 2003 | Vijayam | Koti | "Eeji Ooji Sunoji", "Kusalama" | |
| 2003 | Villain | Vidyasagar | "Hello Hello", "Nagunde" | |
| 2004 | Swamy | M. M. Keeravani | "Naa Peru Ramba" | |
| 2004 | Anji | Mani Sharma | "Abbo Neeyamma", "Mirapakaya" | |
| 2004 | Malliswari | Koti | "Janma Janmala" | |
| 2004 | Samba | Mani Sharma | "Tagilandi Rabba", "Nandamuri Chandamama" | |
| 2004 | Adavi Ramudu | Mani Sharma | "Govindha" | |
| 2004 | Cheppave Chirugalee | S. A. Rajkumar | "Happy New Year" | |
| 2004 | Nenu | Vidyasagar | "Panendu Dhaati" | |
| 2004 | Sye | M. M. Keeravani | "Gootlo Undi" | |
| 2004 | Suryam | Chakri | "Akumuttadi Sokumuttadi" | |
| 2004 | Donga Dongadi | Dhina | "Andam Guntaru" | |
| 2004 | Love Today | Vidyasagar | "Sunday", "I Love You" | |
| 2004 | Khushi Khushiga | S. A. Rajkumar | "Chamanthi Poobanthi" | |
| 2004 | Letha Manasulu | M. M. Keeravani | "Kanulakela", "Kur Ku Kuru", "Anati Mana Chelimi" | |
| 2004 | Shiv Shankar | Ilaiyaraaja | "Jabilamma Uguthunnadi", "Endhirayyo" | |
| 2004 | Ishtapadi | M. M. Srilekha | "Yevarivi Lalana" | |
| 2004 | Dosth | Koti | "Ippa Sara Kottaro", "Jeevitham Oka Aatara" | |
| 2004 | Preminchukunnam Pelliki Randi | Koti | "Bollywoodlo" | |
| 2005 | Jai Chiranjeeva | Mani Sharma | "Ko Kokodi" | |
| 2005 | Andhrudu | Kalyani Malik | "Pari Ayee Parades" (Note: Hindi song in a Telugu film) | |
| 2005 | Sri | Sandeep Chowta | "Are Chi Chi", "Sindhura" | |
| 2005 | Narasimhudu | Mani Sharma | "Singu Singu" | |
| 2005 | Naa Oopiri | Deepak Dev | "Konchum, Konchum", "Cheliya - Remix", "Cheliya" | |
| 2005 | Chandramukhi | Vidyasagar | "Raa Raa" (Note: Telugu song in a Tamil film) | |
| 2005 | Hungama | S. V. Krishna Reddy | "Bandira Idi Bandira", "Mutthamma Mutthamma" | |
| 2006 | Raja Babu | S. A. Rajkumar | "Nerajana Jana" | |
| 2006 | Ram | Yuvan Shankar Raja | "Qurbani", "Pilla Bhale(Folk)" | |
| 2006 | Astram | S. A. Rajkumar | "Padaharey", "Sakhiya-Karunya", "Sakiya-Hariharan" | |
| 2006 | Game | Joshua Sridhar | "Ataladukundam", "Masthu Mega City" | |
| 2006 | Bangaram | Vidyasagar | "Jaishambo", "Bangaram", "Bangaram (Remix)", "Maro Masthi Maro", "Egire Chilakamma" | |
| 2006 | Premante Inthe | Koti | "Chockantipilla" | |
| 2007 | Maharathi | Guru Kiran | "Uppu Chepa", "Maja Maja" | |
| 2007 | Mantra | Anand | "Maha Maha" | |
| 2007 | Allare Allari | Chakri | "Jigi Jigi Sona" | |
| 2007 | Bahumathi | S. V. Krishna Reddy | "Nippu" | |
| 2008 | Nagaram | Chakri | "Hoshiyare Hoshiyare" | |
| 2009 | Eenadu | Shruti Haasan | "Ningi Hadhu" | |
| 2009 | Magadheera | M. M. Keeravani | "Bangaru Kodi Petta (Remix)" | |
| 2009 | Drona | Anup Rubens | "Vennela Vaana" | |
| 2010 | Seetaramula Kalyanam | Anup Rubens | "Adhirindhi" | |
| 2010 | Bindaas | Bobo Shashi | "Bindaas", "Entamma", "Character of Ajay", "Spirit of Bindaas" | |
| 2010 | Shikkar | M. Jayachandran | "Prathighattiosu" (Note: Telugu song in a Malayalam film) | |
| 2011 | Prema Kavali | Anup Rubens | "Listen To My Heart" | |
| 2011 | Aha Naa Pellanta | Raghu Kunche | "Left Choosthey" | |
| 2011 | Brahmi Gadi Katha | Koti | "Cheppaleni Maata" | |
| 2012 | Tuneega Tuneega | Karthik Raja | "Merise Ninge" | |
| 2012 | Genius | Joshua Sridhar | "Allah Nesthama" | |
| 2012 | Racha | Bappi Lahiri, Mani Sharma | "Vaana Vaana (Remix)" | |
| 2013 | Barishter Shankar Naraayan | Saketh | "Yennenni Kalalo", "Pragathiki", "Poovalle", "Mounam", "Apples Kg", "Yennenni Kalalo Solo" | |
| 2013 | Action 3D | Sai Karthik | "Mamacita" | |
| 2014 | Kotha Janta | J.B. | "Atu Amalapuram - Remix" | |
| 2015 | Subramanyam For Sale | Dinesh | "Guvva Gorinkatho" | |
| 2015 | James Bond | Sai Kartheek | "Arey Hello Hello" | |
| 2015 | Pataas | Sai Karthik | "Arey O Samba" | |
| 2016 | Malupu | Prasan Praveen Shyam | "Chalaki Pilla", "Avo Avo Gopalaa" | |
| 2017 | Meda Meeda Abbai | Shaan Rahman | "Ontari Manasa", "Kalamu Aagipodu" | |
| 2018 | Naa Love Story | Kondapalli Vedagiri | "Vurulu Perulu", "Sarigaa Vinnana", "Srimanthuda Samanthuda", "Nanne Vadhili Poye" | |
| 2024 | Swag | Vivek Sagar | "Guvva Gootilo", "Neelo Naalo" | |

=== As lyricist for dubbed films ===
| Year | Film | Music Director | Song(s) | Notes | Ref(s) |
|---|---|---|---|---|---|
| 1995 | Aame Kapuram | Ilaiyaraaja | "Kattidanyya Kanchipattu", "Vishaka Punnami", "Prema Eda Manasa", "Paitaku Paatalu", "Uge Manasu" | Dubbed version of Rasa Magan | |
| 1995 | Kurradu Baboi | Ilaiyaraaja | "Masthana Masthana", "Sirivada Sinamma" | Dubbed version of Raasaiyya | |
| 1996 | Prema Desam | A. R. Rahman | "Mustafa Mustafa", "Vennela", "College Style", "O Vennela", "Prema Prema", "Hello Doctor" | Dubbed version of Kadhal Desam | |
| 1996 | Bharateeyudu | A. R. Rahman | "Maayaama Chendra", "Teppalelli Poyaaka", "Pachani Chilukalu", "Telephone" | Dubbed version of Indian | |
| 1996 | Muthu | A. R. Rahman | "Tilana Tilana", "Okade Okkadu", "Kalagalle Prema", "Visririnda Vidhi Galam", "Konga Chiti Konga" | Dubbed version of Muthu | |
| 1996 | Prema Lekha | Deva | "Nee Pilupe Prema Geetham", "Digulu Padakuraa Sahodaraa", "Pattu Pattu Paruvaala Pattu", "Chinnadaana Osi Chinnadaana", "Priyaa Ninu Chudalekaa", "Yerupu Lolaku Kulikenu" | Dubbed version of Kadhal Kottai | |
| 1996 | Mr. Romeo | A. R. Rahman | "Romeo Natyam Cheste", "Monalisa Monalisa", "Arerere Rang Dhole" | Dubbed version of Mr. Romeo | |
| 1996 | College Gate | Deva | "Stella College Laila", "Super Hit Na Pata", "Na Hrudayam Neeke", "Kanne Vayassu", "Kashmira Apple Bugga", "Erra Gulabi Edi Erra", "Chinga Chika Poova" | Dubbed version of Kalloori Vaasal | |
| 1997 | Nuvve Naa Preyasi | Deva | "Bhagavane", "Ie Kshanamaina", "Vennelalo", "Babilona", "Chinnari Poo", "Andalu" | Dubbed version of Kaalamellam Kadhal Vaazhga | |
| 1997 | Rakshakudu | A. R. Rahman | "Soniya Soniya", "Chanduruni Thaakinadi", "Preme Naa Gamyamannaa", "Ninne Ninne", "Mercury Poolu", "Kalavaa Kanne Kalavaa", "Bombay Madras Delhi", "Lucky Lucky" | Dubbed version of Ratchagan | |
| 1997 | Great Man | Deva | "Yelloraa Yellorra", "Majala Varsham", "O Laali", "Chepa Choosthe", "Sullurupeta Roadu Meeda" | Dubbed version of Adimai Changili | |
| 1997 | V.I.P. | Ranjit Barot | "Indrudu Ithadaa" | Dubbed version of V. I. P. | |
| 1997 | Priyuraalu | Ilaiyaraaja | "Oohane Tanuvugaa", "Padmanaabha Sukumaari", "Jangu Jangu Jangu", "Are Chuchinaaru" | Dubbed version of Kanmani Oru Kavidhai | |
| 1997 | Pellikala Vachesinde Bala | Sirpi | "Darling Darling", "Yavvanam Unte Chaalu", "Nuvuleka Nelenu" | Dubbed version of Poochudava | |
| 1998 | A | Guru Kiran | "Poovalle Navvinche", "Idi Oneday Match", "Ambakallu Errabaditha" | Dubbed version of A | |
| 1998 | Hrudayanjali | A. R. Rahman | "Edapai Jarina", "Palakollu Mavayya" | Dubbed version of May Maadham | |
| 1999 | Vaalee | Deva | "Sona Sona", "April Maasamlo", "Holalla Holalla" | Dubbed version of Vaalee | |
| 1999 | Jodi | A. R. Rahman | "Andaala Jeeva", "Nanu Preminchananu", "Hrudayanni", "Kadhile Kalamey", "Nanu Preminchananu-Sad" | Dubbed version of Jodi | |
| 1999 | Hello My Dear Monisha | T. Rajendar | "Monisha", "Hello Hello", "Ashala Ashala", "No Problem", "Edemito", "College Unnade", "Don't Try To", "Premantu Tappinccha", "Nammodhu Nammodhu", "Oh Prema", "Monalisa Monalisa" | Dubbed version of Monisha En Monalisa | |
| 2000 | Thenali | A. R. Rahman | "Ikkada Tadite" | Dubbed version of Thenali | |
| 2000 | Prema Savvadi | Ilaiyaraaja | "Midnight Mama" | Dubbed version of Kadhal Rojavae | |
| 2001 | Nagadevatha | Hamsalekha | "O Malli", "Murali Ravali Yadalo", "Muthaitha Gangamma", "O Priya...naaga Naagini", "Jagathilo Nee Unnadi", "Chinamma Paalincha" | Dubbed version of Naga Devathe | |
| 2001 | Preyasi Nannu Preminchu | S. A. Rajkumar | "Thyagarajuni", "Kallalona", "Pedaviki Chekkiliki", "College Getu", "Ne Samarlakota" | Dubbed version of Pennin Manathai Thottu | |
| 2001 | Cheli | Harris Jayaraj | "Aei Vennella Sona", "Kannulu Neevi", "Manohara", "Manohara - Part 2", "Ningiki Jabili Andam", "Ooh Mama", "Varshinche Megamila Neynunna" | Dubbed version of Minnale | |
| 2001 | Nannu Preminchave | Hamsalekha | "Preminchave Nannu", "Say Yes Or No", "Ye Ningidi Chukka", "Evaramma", "E Nadumuki Jai", "Holi Holi Holi" | Dubbed version of Preethse | |
| 2002 | Roja Poolu | Bharadwaj | "Muddu Muddu Rojave", "College Rootullo Ladies", "Cheliya Cheliya Siggenduke", "Mucchhataga Muchhtaga", "Subbamma Subbamma", "Apple Pilla Naavevaro" | Dubbed version of Roja Kootam | |
| 2002 | Jaatheeya Pathaakam | Vidyasagar | "Sixteena Seventeena", "Noorellaku Okapari", "Mr Hollywood Nuvvele", "Yahan Ladki Hai", "Maharani Sultana" | Dubbed version of Thayin Manikodi | |
| 2005 | Aparichitudu | Harris Jayaraj | "Love Elephantla", "O Sukumari", "Jiyyangari", "Kondakaki" | Dubbed version of Anniyan | |
| 2005 | Ghajini | Harris Jayaraj | "Hrudayam Ekkadunnadi" | Dubbed version of Ghajini | |
| 2005 | Manmadha | Yuvan Shankar Raja | "Andala Menakave" | Dubbed version of Manmadhan | |
| 2005 | Chandramukhi | Vidyasagar | "Devuda Devuda", "Annagari Mata" | Dubbed version of Chandramukhi | |
| 2005 | Majaa | Vidyasagar | "Yera Brotheru", "Chi Chi Chi Chi", "Ayyaretu" | Dubbed version of Majaa | |
| 2005 | Koti | D. Imman | "Gaganana Meriseti", "Vastara Pilustunnara" | Dubbed version of Chinna | |
| 2006 | Vallabha | Yuvan Shankar Raja | "Ammade Alladi" | Dubbed version of Vallavan | |
| 2006 | Dhoolpet | Yuvan Shankar Raja | "Nippulu", "Okkanati", "Vastara", "Poovandham", "Maa Area", "Okkanati - Remix" | Dubbed version of Pudhupettai | |
| 2006 | Kidnap | Devi Sri Prasad | "Hai Cheera Kanu" | Dubbed version of Maayavi | |
| 2006 | Aakrosham | Yuvan Shankar Raja | "Tholivalape", "O Chooputho", "Chi Chilake", "Janam O Ghatana", "Amma Antunna", "Ekkadiko" | Dubbed version of Nandhaa | |
| 2006 | Preminchi Choodu | Harris Jayaraj | "Sie Sie Sie", "Shodhinchuko", "Enni Janmala Bhandham", "Enno Ennenno Kalale", "O Manasa", "Lieko Laima" | Dubbed version of Ullam Ketkumae | |
| 2006 | Manasuna Manasai | Yuvan Shankar Raja | "Manchekadamaina", "All day Jolly day", "Chitti Chitti", "Kila Kila", "Chedugudu Chedugudu", "Andala Suryude" | Dubbed version of Manadhai Thirudivittai | |
| 2006 | Paramashivam | Vidyasagar | "Thaja Roja" | Dubbed version of Paramasivan | |
| 2007 | Muni | Bharadwaj | "Chura Chura", "Kuhulla Khulla", "Assa Bussa", "Vasthadoye Muni", "Thala Kekkiro" | Dubbed version of Muni | |
| 2007 | Deva | Yuvan Shankar Raja | "Kondapalli Nimmakaya" | Dubbed version of Vel | |
| 2007 | Himsinchey 23va Raju Pulakesi | Sabesh–Murali | "Anthahpuram", "Aasha Kanavey" | Dubbed version of Imsai Arasan 23rd Pulikecei | |
| 2007 | Ee | Srikanth Deva | "Nippalley Ragiley", "Kala Kala", "Rara Bava", "Oke Oka", "Ithi Oka", "Na Swasaga", "Premante Oka" | Dubbed version of E | |
| 2008 | Dasavatharam | Himesh Reshammiya | "Ka Katukaki" | Dubbed version of Dasavathaaram | |
| 2008 | Nela Meeda Thaaralu | Shankar–Ehsaan–Loy | "Dekho Dekho", "Ennadu Amma Chappelo" | Dubbed version of Taare Zameen Par | |
| 2008 | Aarya M.B.B.S | Mani Sharma | "Saniya Sonia", "Etantav Nuvve Etantav", "Vennela Koona", "Jille Jille" | Dubbed version of Aarya | |
| 2008 | Kalidas | Himesh Reshammiya | "Check Check Sakhuda", "Yadaloni Kalalanni" | Dubbed version of Bommalattam | |
| 2008 | Gajendra | D. Imman | "Raja Andhrakey", "Na Pranam", "Aree Lady Lady", "Challani Punnami", "Marona Masti" | Dubbed version of Durai | |
| 2008 | Pardhu | Srikanth Deva | "Konda Mallappa", "Sexy Sexy", "Jabba Kotti", "Oollani Thirigey", "Amma Ninu", "Neli Kanula", "Enno Rathrulu" | Dubbed version of Pandi | |
| 2009 | Ghatikudu | Harris Jayaraj | "Asale Pilla", "Edo Edo", "Damakku Damakku", "Mrogindi", "Dheko Dheko", "Maasi Maasi" | Dubbed version of Aadhavan | |
| 2009 | Sachin | Devi Sri Prasad | "Rey Rey Kurragada" | Dubbed version of Sachein | |
| 2009 | Kalasala | Joshua Sridhar | "College", "June July" | Dubbed version of Kalloori | |
| 2009 | Rajadhi Raja | Karunas | "Annavaram Akkapuram", "Guttonkaya" | Dubbed version of Rajadhi Raja | |
| 2010 | Nene Ambani | Yuvan Shankar Raja | "Aire Aire Nenegiripothine", "Rampa Chodaram Bathayi Pallu" | Dubbed version of Boss Engira Bhaskaran | |
| 2010 | Awaara | Yuvan Shankar Raja | "Mandaara Poovalle", "Chuttesai Chuttesai" | Dubbed version of Paiyaa | |
| 2010 | Yuganiki Okkadu | G. V. Prakash Kumar | "Ninnu Eri kori", "Neemeede Aasaga", "Singaarinchana", "Mammalni Paalinchu", "Daachindi Manne", "Oh Eesa" | Dubbed version of Aayirathil Oruvan | |
| 2010 | Sarvam | Yuvan Shankar Raja | "Gallo Thele", "Saradaga" | Dubbed version of Sarvam | |
| 2010 | Robo | A. R. Rahman | "Kilimanjaro Bhala" & "Boom Boom Robo Ra" | Dubbed version of Enthiran | |
| 2011 | 7th Sense | Harris Jayaraj | "Oh Ringa Ringa", "Mutyala Dhaarani", "Yellae Lama", "Amma Amma", "Endukanta Joda" | Dubbed version of 7 Aum Arivu | |
| 2011 | Kanchana | Thaman. S | "Kanney Danimmakai" | Dubbed version of Kanchana | |
| 2011 | Ra-One | Vishal–Shekhar | "Right By Your Side (Alano Elano)", "Veera (Sandramlaa)" | Dubbed version of Ra.One | |
| 2011 | Puliveta | Vijay Antony | "Yeda Alapai", "Thikkedo" | Dubbed version of Vettaikaaran | |
| 2011 | Urumi | Deepak Dev | "Vikasinche" | Dubbed version of Urumi | |
| 2011 | Priya Priyathama | Vidyasagar | "Yedaningi", "Andhi Andhani Andalu", "Jaaji Poola Vanne", "Oho Oho Oorodhili", "One Night Ilalo" | Dubbed version of Kanden Kadhalai | |
| 2012 | OK OK | Harris Jayaraj | "Akhilaa Akhilaa", "Kalalaa Oka Devate" | Dubbed version of Oru Kal Oru Kannadi | |
| 2012 | Love Journey | Satish Chakravarthy | "Evaro Ee Cheli" | Dubbed version of Kanimozhi | |
| 2012 | Mask | K | "Naataina Bar Anthem" | Dubbed version of Mugamoodi | |
| 2012 | Naluguru Snehithula Katha | Sundar C. Babu | "Enemeidi Kallaku", "Gucheti Chupulu" | Dubbed version of Thoonga Nagaram | |
| 2012 | Scam | Sundar C. Babu | "Chilakalu Rendu", "Mukkona Simhasanam", "Ningi Okkate Haddu", "Five Feet Puvvula", "Mukkona Simhasanam - Club Mix" | Dubbed version of Agarathi | |
| 2013 | A B C D Any Body Can Dance | Sachin–Jigar | "Buddhi Sidhhi Vruddhi Anni", "Naalo Utsaahame" | Dubbed version of ABCD: Any Body Can Dance | |
| 2013 | Dandupalyam | Arjun Janya | "Teliso Theliyako", "Evaro Neevu", "Killi Nenu Killi", "Raakshasam", "Police Theme" | Dubbed version of Dandupalya | |
| 2014 | Sikindar | Yuvan Shankar Raja | "Chirrunavvey Speciality" | Dubbed version of Anjaan | |
| 2014 | Veerudokkade | Devi Sri Prasad | "Manchivaanni", "Jinguchakka", "Kallu Kallu", "Maata Thattadhu", "Ratha Gajathuraga" | Dubbed version of Veeram | |
| 2014 | Bhadram | Nivas K. Prasanna | "Ee Sargamalo", "Nestam Jayam", "Valapai Virise", "Kallalo Oka Vedhukai", "Nevele Nevele" | Dubbed version of Thegidi | |
| 2014 | Kulfi | Yuvan Shankar Raja, Vivek-Martin | "Logunna Life" | Dubbed version of Vadacurry | |
| 2014 | Kaththi | Anirudh Ravichander | "Kottu Kottu Whistle Kottle" | Dubbed version of Kaththi | |
| 2014 | Citizen | C. Sathya | "Lovulo" | Dubbed version of Ivan Veramathiri | |
| 2016 | Police | G. V. Prakash Kumar | "Jithula Jilladi", "Dub Police Step" | Dubbed version of Theri | |
| 2016 | Inkokkadu | Harris Jayaraj | "Chilaka O Chilaka" | Dubbed version of Iru Mugan | |
| 2016 | Kathakali | Hiphop Tamizha | "Jathaga Kalisi" | Dubbed version of Kathakali | |
| 2016 | Kaashmora | Santhosh Narayanan | "Oyaa Oyaa" | Dubbed version of Kaashmora | |
| 2016 | Kalavathi | Hiphop Tamizha | "Povaddhe", "Kanchi Mittai" | Dubbed version of Aranmanai 2 | |
| 2016 | Memu | Arrol Corelli | "Kaanalona" | Dubbed version of Pasanga 2 | |
| 2017 | Nagaram | Javed Riaz | "Yentey Pilla" | Dubbed version of Maanagaram | |
| 2017 | Mr. Karthik | G. V. Prakash Kumar | "Nenannadhi Oka Paluke" | Dubbed version of Mayakkam Enna | |
| 2017 | Gajendrudu | Yuvan Shankar Raja | "Paccha Pacchani" | Dubbed version of Kadamban | |
| 2018 | Pelli Roju | Justin Prabhakaran | "Mangalyamey", "Pata Padandi" | Dubbed version of Oru Naal Koothu | |
| 2018 | Pandem Kodi 2 | Yuvan Shankar Raja | "Paalaksha", "Sooriyadu Chandradu" | Dubbed version of Sandakozhi 2 | |
| 2018 | Kotikokkadu | D. Imman | "Mounamenduko" | Dubbed version of Kotigobba 2 | |
| 2018 | Dandupalyam 3 | Arjun Janya | "Ganja Ganja Ganja", "Aaru Aaru" | Dubbed version of Dandupalya 3 | |
| 2019 | Viswasam | D. Imman | "Vaanaa Vaanaa" | Dubbed version of Viswasam | |
| 2019 | Seemaraja | D. Imman | "Nuvve Leka Nene" | Dubbed version of Seemaraja | |
| 2019 | Action | Hiphop Tamizha | "Maula Maula", "Lights Camera Action" | Dubbed version of Action | |
| 2019 | Aame | Pradeep Kumar | "O Pichi Manasaa", "Jananam Maranam", "Modhata" | Dubbed version of Aadai | |
| 2019 | Mamangam | M. Jayachandran | "Mukkhera Mukkhera", "Lullaby (Laali Paata) Song", "Promo Song", "Kore Valapulu" | Dubbed version of Mamangam | |
| 2020 | Vikram Rathode | Ilaiyaraaja | "Telugu Jaathi Goppadanam" | Dubbed version of Tamilarasan | |
| 2021 | Chakra | Yuvan Shankar Raja | "Amma Nuvante Naaku Pranam" | Dubbed version of Chakra | |
| 2021 | Kurup | Sushin Shyam, Sulaiman Kakkodan, Leo Tom | "Edi Paravasamo", "Dingiri Dingale", "Anuvynakaalam", "Simhapujulu Ni Patti", "Dhaarelekunna" | Dubbed version of Kurup | |
| 2022 | Valimai | Yuvan Shankar Raja | "Naadhi Vere Maata" | Dubbed version of Valimai | |

== Awards ==
He received number of awards from different organizations.

- Kala Sagar Award
- Vamsee Award
- Kovvali Centenary Award
- Samudrala Award
- Vanguri Foundation Honour
