= KD No:1 =

- Theatrical release poster
- Directed by: K. Raghavendra Rao
- Written by: D. V. Narasa Raju(dialogues)
- Screenplay by: K. Raghavendra Rao
- Based on: Dus Numbri by S. Ali Raza
- Produced by: K. Devi Vara Prasad
- Starring: N. T. Rama Rao; Jayasudha
- Cinematography: A. Vincent
- Edited by: Kandaswamy
- Music by: K. V. Mahadevan
- Production company: Devi Film Productions
- Release date: 15 December 1978
- Running time: 125 minutes
- Country: India
- Language: Telugu

KD No:1 is a 1978 Indian Telugu-language action film co-written and directed by K. Raghavendra Rao. Produced by K. Devi Varaprasad, the film stars N. T. Rama Rao and Jayasudha, with music composed by K. V. Mahadevan. It is a remake of the Hindi film Dus Numbri (1976). The film ran for over 100 days in theatres.

== Plot ==
Krishna, who earns the notorious title of KD No. 1 while secretly pursuing a gang responsible for circulating counterfeit currency. His quest for justice is driven by a desire to restore his family's honour, which was tarnished when his father, Inspector Rama Rao, was wrongfully imprisoned, and his mother, Santhamma, was driven to insanity and placed in an asylum.

Krishna meets a petty thief named Lilly, and the two form a close bond. Strangely, Santhamma reacts to Lilly, calling her by the name Sundari. Krishna investigates Lilly's background and learns from her foster father, Johnson, that she was entrusted to him by a burglar named Jaggu. Lilly’s presence helps revive Santhamma's mental state.

Jaggu soon reappears, kidnaps Lilly, and attempts to sell her to her biological father, Ram Prasad. Krishna rescues Lilly and reunites her with Ram Prasad, who realizes she bears a striking resemblance to her mother, Sundari. Krishna soon discovers that Ram Prasad is the key to uncovering the truth behind his family's downfall. During his investigation, it is revealed that Inspector General Yugandhar is the true mastermind behind the counterfeit operation. Krishna also learns that his father, Rama Rao, and Ram Prasad were once close friends with Yugandhar.

In a flashback, it is revealed that Rama Rao had confronted Ram Prasad over their illegal activities, leading Yugandhar to frame Rama Rao for a crime he did not commit. Sundari, Ram Prasad's wife, was about to expose Yugandhar's misdeeds, but she was killed by Jaggu under Yugandhar’s orders.

In the present, Krishna confronts Yugandhar, who kidnaps Santhamma and mortally wounds Ram Prasad. In a final showdown, Krishna defeats Yugandhar and clears his father’s name. The film concludes with Krishna and Lilly getting married, restoring peace and honor to Krishna’s family.

== Cast ==
- N. T. Rama Rao as Krishna
- Jayasudha as Lilly Ratnam / Sarada and Sundari (dual role)
- Satyanarayana as Head Constable Venkata Swamy / C. B. I. Officer Sadasiva Rao
- Jaggayya as I. G. Yugandhar
- Anjali Devi as Santhamma
- Prabhakar Reddy as Ram Prasad
- Mikkilineni as Inspector Rama Rao
- Mukkamala as Johnson
- Mada as Chitchat
- P. J. Sarma as Doctor
- Chalapathi Rao as Inspector Mohan Rao
- Jayamalini as Dorasani Narsamma / Geetha Chowdary

== Soundtrack ==
Music composed by K. V. Mahadevan.

Song title	Lyrics	Singers	Length
"Yes Nene No:1"	Acharya Aatreya	S. P. Balasubrahmanyam	3:18
"Sarigama Padanisa"	Veturi	S. P. Balasubrahmanyam, P. Susheela	3:11
"Aakalundadu"	Veturi	S. P. Balasubrahmanyam, P. Susheela	3:14
"Malli Malli"	Veturi	S. P. Balasubrahmanyam, P. Susheela	3:20
"Merakeedhi Mallini"	Veturi	S. P. Balasubrahmanyam, P. Susheela, G. Anand	3:17
"Poonindiro Polerama"	Acharya Aatreya	S. Janaki	3:20
