= Kondaveeti Raja =

1986 film by K. Raghavendra Rao

- Theatrical poster
- Directed by: K. Raghavendra Rao
- Written by: Paruchuri Brothers (story/screenplay)
- Produced by: K. Devi Varaprasad
- Starring: Chiranjeevi; Vijayashanti; Radha; Rao Gopal Rao; Kaikala Satyanarayana
- Cinematography: K. S. Prakash
- Edited by: Kotagiri Venkateswara Rao
- Music by: K. Chakravarthy
- Production company: Devi Film Productions
- Release date: 31 January 1986
- Running time: 140 minutes
- Country: India
- Language: Telugu

Kondaveeti Raja is a 1986 Telugu action drama film directed by K. Raghavendra Rao and produced by K. Devi Varaprasad. It stars Chiranjeevi, Vijayashanti, Radha, and Rao Gopal Rao. The film was released on 31 January 1986.

== Plot ==
The film begins with Raja coming to a historic village called Rathnagiri in search of some work. There is an old fort in this village and every one in that village believes that there is a hidden treasure inside. Sarvarayudu, a rich man in the village, tries every possible way to explore that treasure. He unearths the secret of this hidden treasure. Raja becomes a problem for Sarvarayudu by interfering in all his misdeeds. Unexpectedly, Padma is in the same village and she meets Raja to gives her heart to him. But Raja falls in love with another village belle, Rani. Raja realizes the truth that it was Sarvarayudu who killed his sister and plans to take revenge for his sister's murder. He succeeds in his attempts at the cost of Rani's love, who sacrifices her love to help Raja. The hidden treasure is recovered and handed over to the government, and Raja and Padma marry.

== Cast ==
- Chiranjeevi as Raja
- Vijayashanti as Rani (Voice Dubbed by Saritha)
- Radha as Padma (Voice Dubbed by Durga)
- Rao Gopala Rao as Papa Rao
- Kaikala Satyanarayana as Venkatrayudu
- Nirmalamma as Parvatamma
- Nutan Prasad as Sarva Rayudu
- Y. Vijaya
- Chalapati Rao
- P. L. Narayana
- Rallapalli as Markata Sastry
- Mada Venkateswara Rao
- Chitti Babu
- P. J. Sarma
- Anuradha

== Music ==
The film's music was composed by Chakravarthy, with all the songs penned by Veturi Sundararama Murthy. The song "Manchamesi" was remixed in the film Seema Sastri.

- "Anganga Veerangame Ammammo Chadarangame"
- "Kommalaki Koilaki Patalaki Pallaviki"
- "Konda Kona Sanditlo Pelli"
- "Manchamesi Duppatesi Mallepoolu Challanu Rara Rara"
- "Naa Koka Baagunda Naa Raika Baagunda Hoy Hoy Hoy"
- "Oorikanta Neetugade Dham Dham Dham"
- "Yaala Yaala Uyyaalalona Yellakilla Jampalalona"

== Release ==
The film was originally planned to be released on Sankranthi however it got delayed after Chiranjeevi got hurt during a fight scene for another film. According to Vara Prasad, the film was a decent hit and ran in some centres and became a profitable venture.
