= Manchi Donga =

- Theatrical release poster
- Directed by: K. Raghavendra Rao
- Written by: K. Raghavendra Rao (story); M. V. S. Haranatha Rao(dialogues)
- Produced by: Devi Vara Prasad
- Starring: Chiranjeevi; Vijayashanti; Suhasini; Rao Gopal Rao
- Cinematography: K. S. Prakash
- Edited by: Kotagiri Venkateswara Rao
- Music by: K. Chakravarthy
- Distributed by: Devi Film Productions
- Release date: 14 January 1988
- Running time: 147 minutes
- Country: India
- Language: Telugu

Manchi Donga (transl. Good Thief) is a 1988 Telugu-language film directed by K. Raghavendra Rao. The film stars Chiranjeevi, Vijayashanti and Suhasini.

== Plot ==
Manchi Donga has Chiranjeevi as Veerendra, who is liked by one and all. Even though he is a thief, Veerendra follows certain principles. Suryam and Chandram are a father and son who are involved in an illegal occupation. Madhavi (Suhasini) who is a lawyer, meets Veerendra and she is attracted towards him for his kindheartedness towards poor people. Vijaya (Vijayasanthi), a friend of Madhavi enters the city as a police inspector. She warns Veerendra for his activities, but Madhavi supports him. Once Veerendra steals a piece of evidence from Gannayya, (also a corrupt person), which has all the details of the activities of Suryam and Chandram. He hands it over to inspector Vijaya. She is very much impressed with his deed and now develops a soft corner for him. After a couple of songs, Veerendra decides to marry Vijaya, while Madhavi sacrifices her silent love for her friend. Veerendra surrenders to the police and is sent to jail. He studies in jail and becomes a police inspector. After his release, he deals with anti-social elements with an iron fist and also receives the Sword of Honour for his efforts.

== Cast ==
- Chiranjeevi as Veerendra
- Vijayashanti as Vijaya
- Suhasini as Madhavi
- Rao Gopal Rao
- Allu Ramalingaiah
- Suthi Velu
- Mohan Babu
- Jaggayya
- Kaikala Satyanarayana
- Nirmalamma

== Soundtrack ==
The soundtrack was composed by K. Chakravarthy.

S.No	Song title	Singers
1	"Kannukotte Vade"	S. P. Balasubrahmanyam
2	"Bedlight Thagginchana"	S. P. Balasubrahmanyam
3	"Naa Rendu Kallaki"	S. P. Balasubrahmanyam
4	"Kadupuloni Babuki"	S. P. Balasubrahmanyam
5	"Mudde Pettamantava"	S. P. Balasubrahmanyam
6	"Re Chukkala Andam"	S. P. Balasubrahmanyam
