= Kathanayakuni Katha =

- Theatrical release poster
- Directed by: D. Yoganand
- Written by: Modukuri Johnson; Appala Chary (dialogues)
- Produced by: K. Devi Vara Prasad
- Starring: N. T. Rama Rao; Vanisri
- Cinematography: J. Satyanarayana
- Edited by: Kandaswamy
- Music by: K. V. Mahadevan
- Production company: Tarakarama Pictures
- Release date: 21 February 1975
- Running time: 154 minutes
- Country: India
- Language: Telugu

Kathanayakuni Katha (transl. Story of a Hero) is a 1975 Indian Telugu-language action drama film, produced by K. Devi Vara Prasad under the Tarakarama Pictures banner and directed by D. Yoganand. It stars N. T. Rama Rao and Vanisri, with music composed by K. V. Mahadevan.

== Cast ==
- N. T. Rama Rao as Ramu
- Vanisri as Lalitha
- Bharathi as Madhuri
- Srividya as Lakshmi
- Satyanarayana as Phanibhushanam
- Prabhakar Reddy as Suresh
- Raja Babu as Babu
- Mikkilineni as Rangaiah
- Allu Ramalingaiah as Sankharaiah
- Pandari Bai as Parvathi
- G. Varalakshmi as Pulatla Tayaramma
- Rama Prabha as Nanchari
- Hemalatha as herself
- Chaya Devi as Chayadevi
- Master Visweswara Rao

== Soundtrack ==
Music composed by K. V. Mahadevan.

Song title	Lyrics	Singers	length
"Vemanna Cheppindhi"	Kosaraju	Ghantasala, P. Leela	3:58
"Chilipi Kalla Baava"	Kosaraju	P. Susheela, L. R. Eswari	4:09
"Cheppanaa Oka Chinna Maata"	Kosaraju	Ghantasala, P. Susheela	3:39
"Devude Chesthaadu"	C. Narayana Reddy	S. P. Balasubrahmanyam, Vani Jayaram	3:59
"Cheyandira Bhojanam"	Kosaraju	Madhavapeddi Satyam	1:54
"Devudu Lokamlo"	Acharya Aatreya	P. Susheela	3:59
"Magasiri Choopula"	Dasaradhi	S. P. Balasubrahmanyam, Vani Jayaram	4:10
"O Tight Pantu"	Kosaraju	Chakravarthy, L. R. Eswari	1:48
"Sreemathigaaroo"	Acharya Aatreya	S. P. Balasubrahmanyam, P. Susheela	4:38
