= Gullapudi =

- Village
- Nickname: GP
- Interactive map of Gullapudi
- Location in Musunuru mandal, Andhra Pradesh, India
- Country: India
- State: Andhra Pradesh
- District: Eluru

Government
  - Type: Panchayat

Area
  - Total: 1.34 km^{2} (0.52 sq mi)

Population (2015)
  - Total: 2.5K+
  - Density: 1.9/km^{2} (4.8/sq mi)

Languages
  - Official: Telugu
- Time zone: UTC+5:30 (IST)
- PIN: 521213
- Telephone code: +91-8656
- Vehicle registration: AP 16
- Sex ratio: male:female=1000:990 ♂/♀
- Literacy: 82.99%%
- Lok Sabha constituency: Eluru
- Assembly constituency: Nuzvid

Gullapudi is a village in Eluru district of the Indian state of Andhra Pradesh. It is located in Musunuru mandal of Nuzvid revenue division.

== Politics ==
Gullapudi falls under the administration of Musunuru mandal and is part of the Nuzvid (GN) Assembly constituency, which in turn is in Andhra Pradesh's Eluru Lok Sabha constituency. As of 2014 the MLA representing Nuzvid constituency is Meka Venkata prtap apparao of the YSR Congress Party.

== Economy ==
Agriculture is the main occupation.

== Transport ==
Eluru is the nearest railway station to the village. It is administered under Secunderabad railway division of the South Central Railway zone. NH 5 is the nearest highway to the village, which connects Chennai in Tamil Nadu to Kolkata in West Bengal. The village has a total road length of 1.00 km (0.62 mi).
