= Sanjeevaiah Park =

Public park in Hyderabad, India

Sanjeevaiah children's Park సంజీవయ్య ఉద్యానవనము
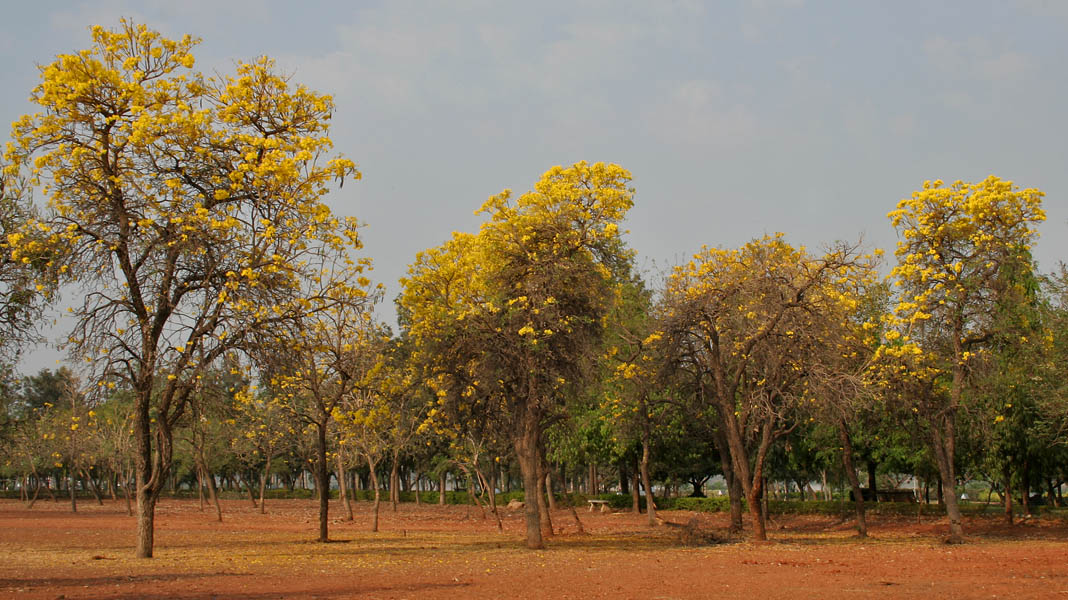
- A series of Caribbean trumpet trees (Tabebuia aurea) that can be seen at the park
- Interactive map of Sanjeevaiah children's Park సంజీవయ్య ఉద్యానవనము
- Type: Public park (Only for Children. People without Children are not allowed)
- Location: Hyderabad, India
- Coordinates: 17.385044°N 78.486671°E
- Area: 92 acres (37 ha)
- Operator: Hyderabad Metropolitan Development Authority
- Status: Open all year

Sanjeevaiah Park is a public greenspace and park in the heart of Hyderabad, in Telangana, India. Built on 92 acres (37 ha) along the banks of Hussain Sagar lake, the park is named after Damodaram Sanjivayya, an erstwhile Chief Minister of Andhra Pradesh. The park is managed by the Hyderabad Metropolitan Development Authority (HMDA). The park won the Best Open Landscape Award during the 2010 Indian National Trust for Art and Cultural Heritage award presentations. The park also houses the second tallest Indian flag.

== Development ==
The Buddha Purnima Project Authority (BPPA), an agency responsible for the beautification and the upkeep of the areas surrounding the Hussain Sagar lake under Hyderabad Urban Development Authority, planned several new recreational facilities for public access in 2004. A 2.4 kilometres (1.5 mi) aerial tramway connecting this park to Lumbini Park, which is located on the other side of the Hussain Sagar lake, was planned. Water sports, amusement park and water slides were also among the planned activities at the park. However, a few years later, the BPPA proposal to convert the park into a recreational area was deemed to be harmful to the park's ecosystem. A study conducted by the regional wildlife advisory board highlighted the need to protect the several species of flora and fauna in the park.

In 2010, the HMDA came up with a new proposal for the park's development. While retaining all the environmental aspects of the park, the agency proposed a plan without construction of any concrete structures. Besides water sports, so as to utilise the huge waterfront, the proposal mooted night illumination, water and energy conservation measures. Part of their allotted budget of ₹130 million (US$1.3 million) for the lake development was to be utilised if the local government agreed to the proposal.

Shortly thereafter, solar lighting was installed at the park. Additionally, HMDA also showcased sculptures made from recycled material as a part of its Hyderabad Eco Art Project initiative. Further to this, BPPA also enforced a ban on usage and littering of plastic in several areas including this park. Necessary awareness activities were started to educate the citizens about the hazards of plastic.

== Fauna ==
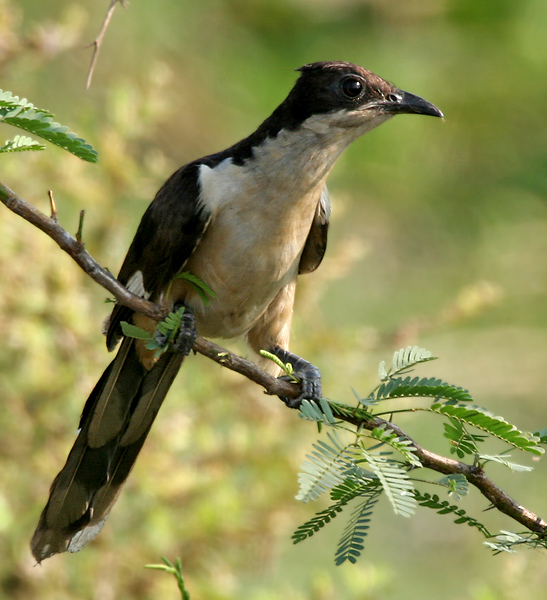
Pied crested cuckoo

About 100 species of resident and non-resident birds and more than 50 species of insects and butterflies are present in the park.

The park is frequented by various migratory species of birds. The pied crested cuckoo, which is considered as a harbinger of the monsoon rains due to the timing of its arrival, is frequently spotted at this park. The local birdwatchers predict rains 15–18 days after spotting this bird. Due to construction work initiated by the Hyderabad Metropolitan Development Authority (HMDA), typical birds such as the spotbills, cranes, common coot, purple herons, cormorants and jacanas were not seen at the park in 2010.

== National Flag ==
The second tallest Indian National Flag is located in this park, the tallest being in Ranchi, India. The height of the flag post is 291 feet (88.69 metres) and the dimensions of the flag are 72 feet x 108 feet. This flag was unfurled on 2 June 2016 by the Chief Minister of Telangana, K. Chandrashekar Rao. This day marked the second anniversary of Telangana's formation since its bifurcation from the state of Andhra Pradesh in 2014. This cost of the flag was reported to be Rs. 2 Crores. The original plan was to unfurl the flag 303 feet high (higher than the tallest flag at Ranchi, which is at a height of 293 feet). However, the Airports Authority of India granted permission to hoist the flag only up to 291 feet.

== Activities ==
The park hosts several events for the public occasionally. Events ranging from roller-skating races to social awareness campaigns, the park has encouraged public initiatives.

== Miscellaneous ==
After the 2007 bombings in Hyderabad, all major parks including this park were put on high security. Owing to this incident, the park witnessed a drastic reduction in the number of visitors.

== Gallery ==
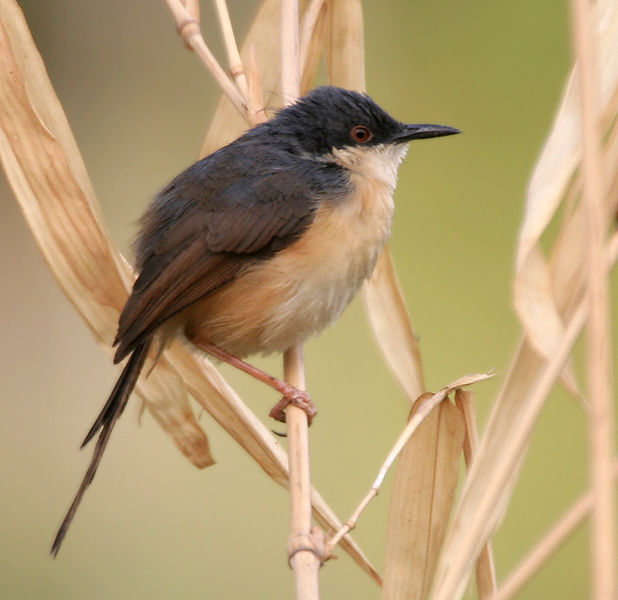
Ashy prinia Prinia socialis

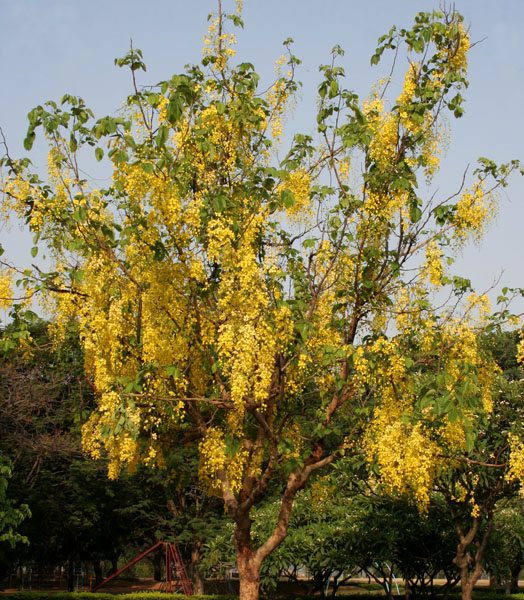
Amaltas Cassia fistula

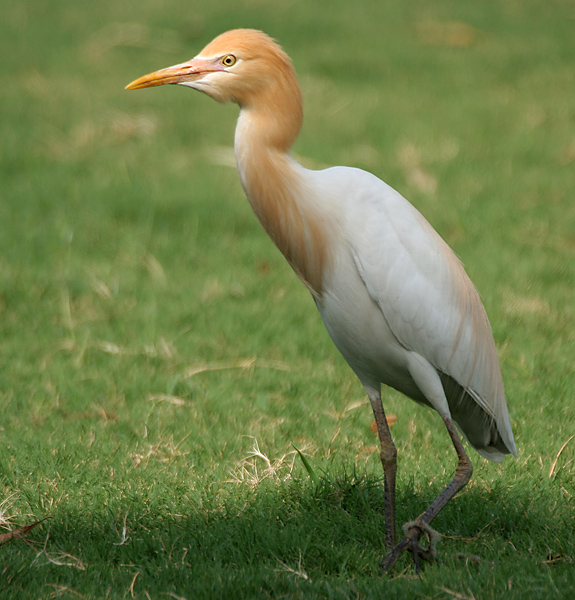
Eastern Cattle egret Ardea coromanda

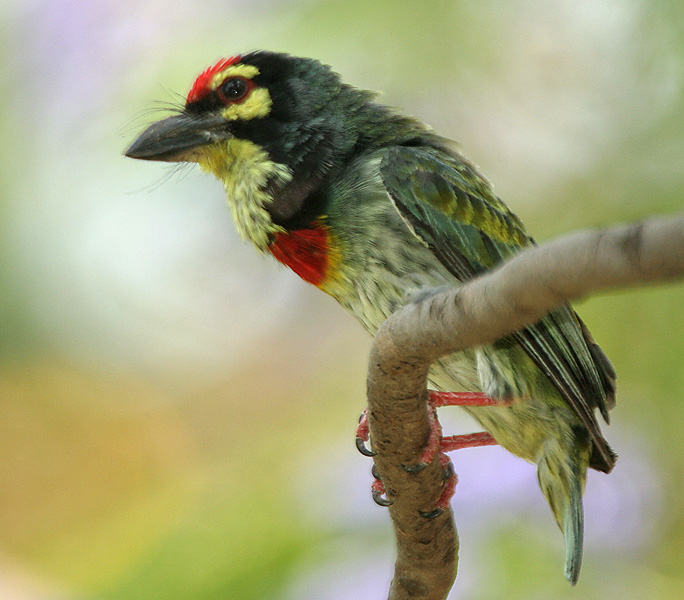
Coppersmith barbet Megalaima haemacephala

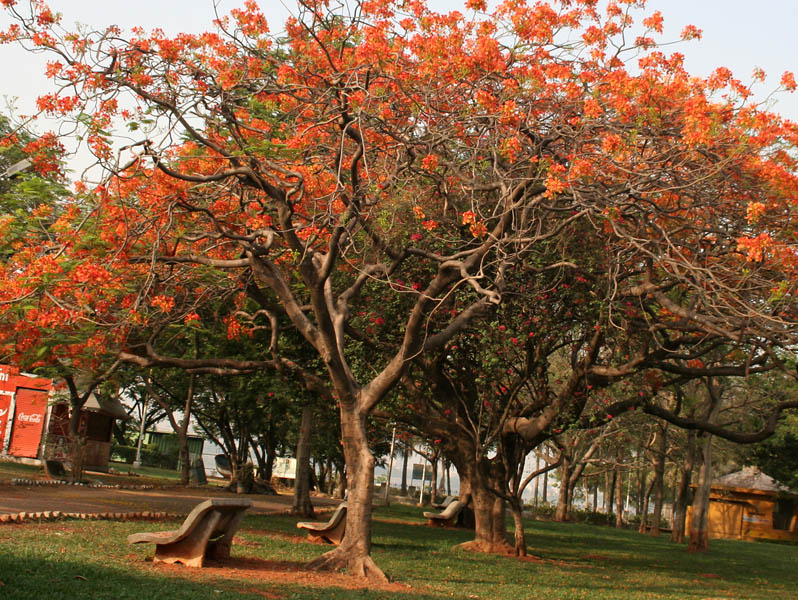
Delonix regia Gulmohur

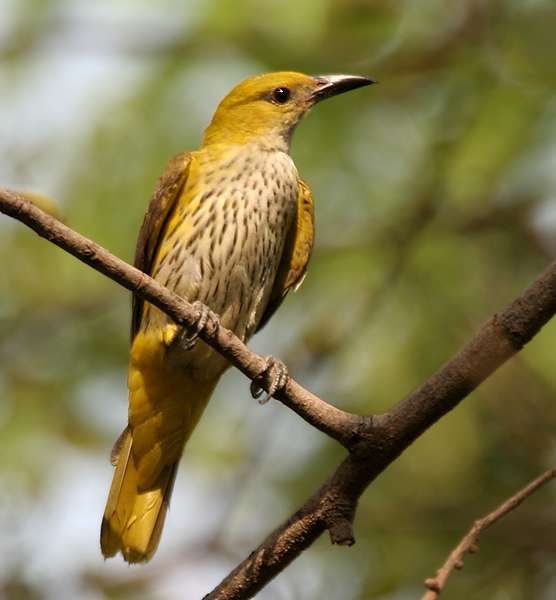
Indian golden oriole Oriolus kundoo

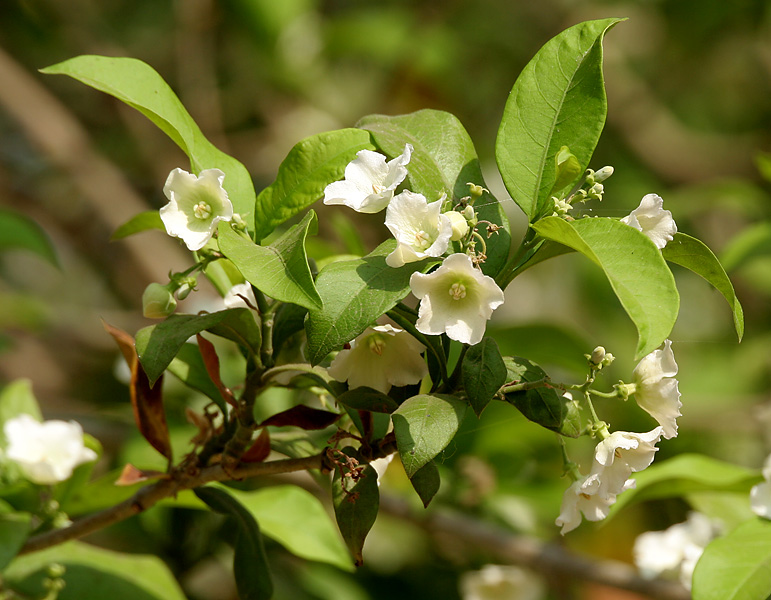
Vallaris solanacea Vish vallari

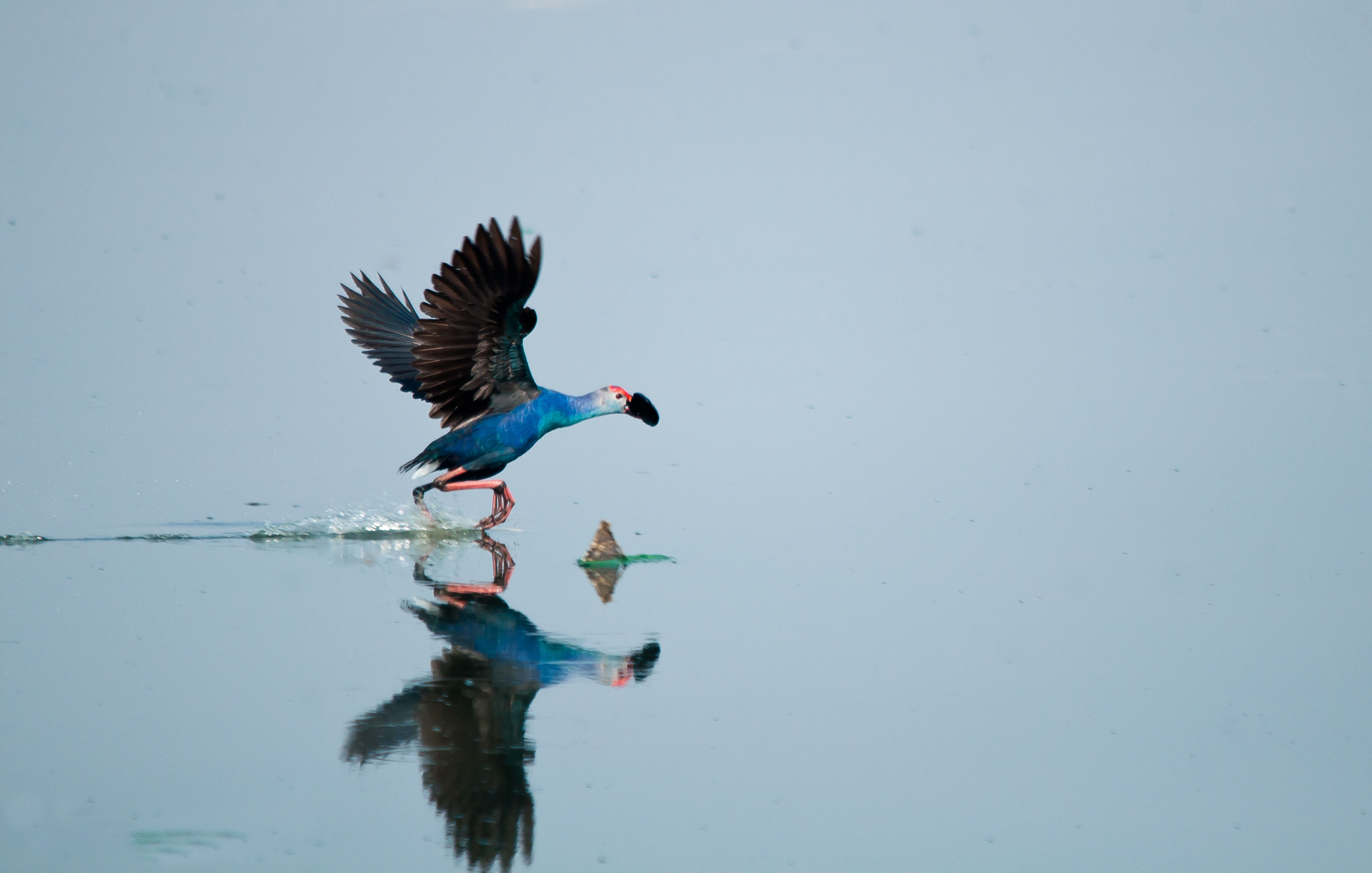
Purple swamphen Porphyrio porphyrio

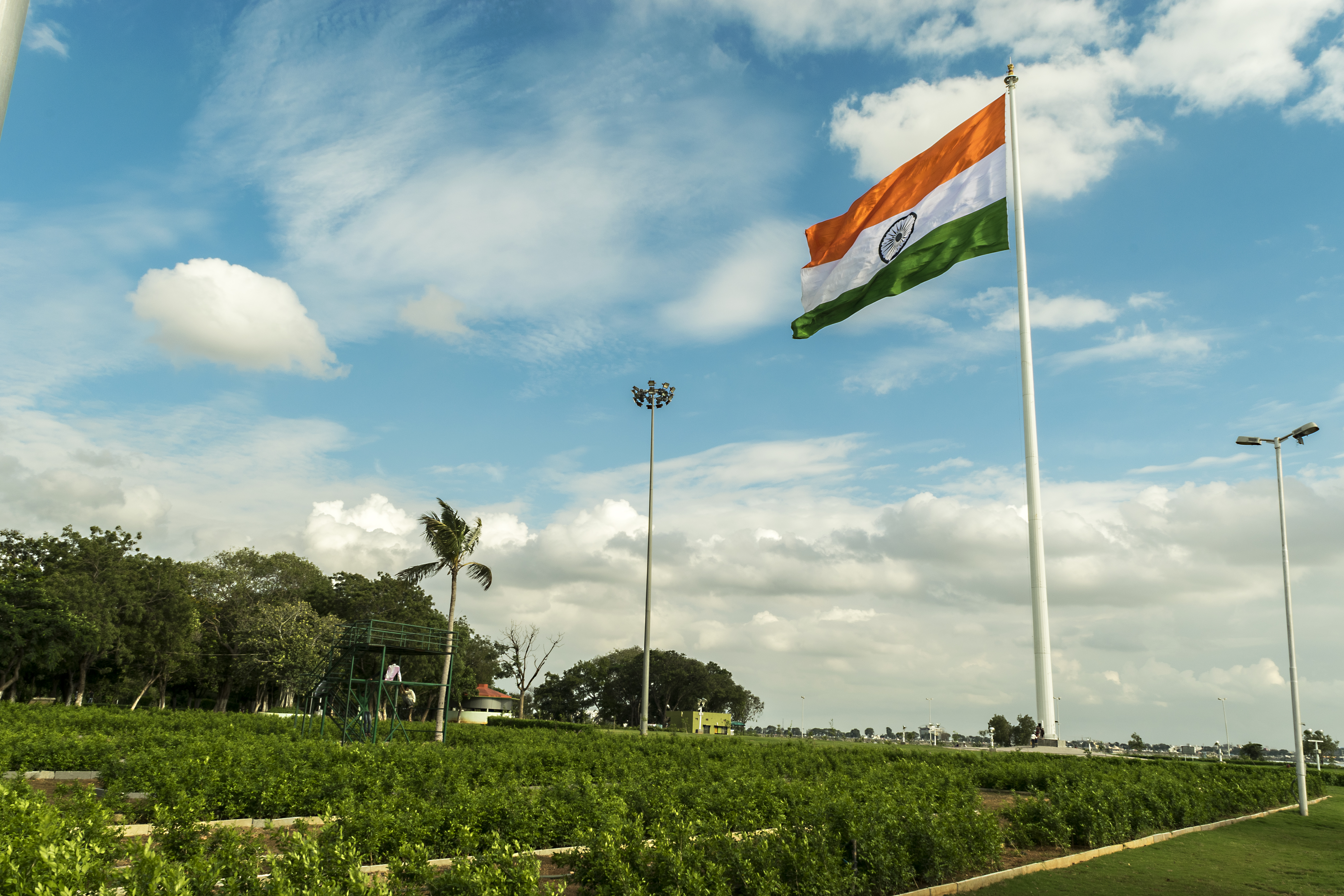
Indian flag in Sanjeeviah park

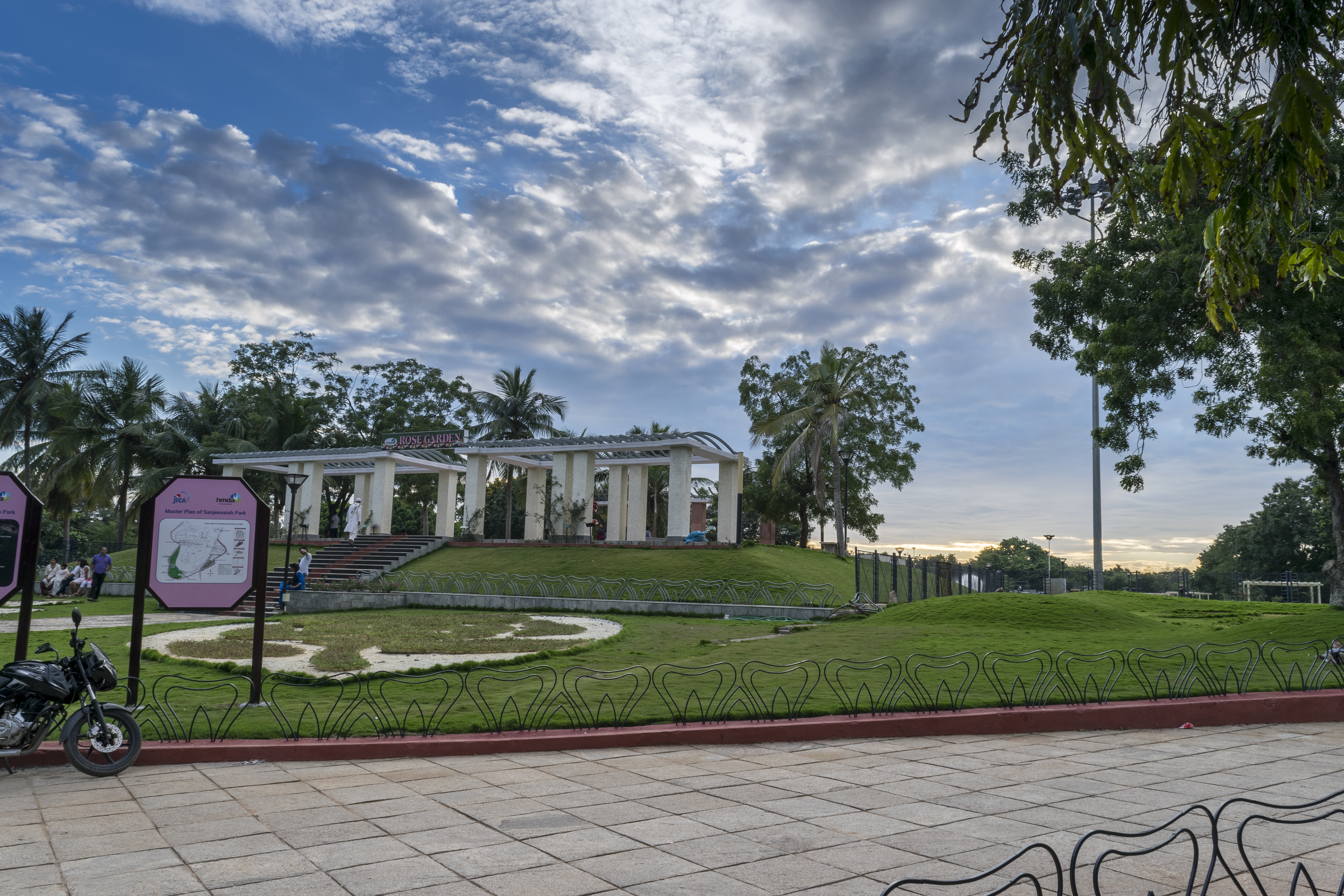
Rose Garden, Sanjeeviah park
