= Gharana Mogudu =

1992 film directed by K. Raghavendra Rao

- Theatrical release poster
- Directed by: K. Raghavendra Rao
- Screenplay by: Paruchuri brothers
- Story by: P. Vasu, Dr Rajkumar
- Based on: Anuraga Aralithu (1986)[Kannada]
- Produced by: Devi Vara Prasad
- Starring: Chiranjeevi; Nagma; Vani Viswanath; Rao Gopal Rao; Kaikala Satyanarayana
- Cinematography: A. Vincent
- Edited by: Kotagiri Venkateswara Rao
- Music by: M. M. Keeravani
- Production company: Devi Film Productions
- Release date: 9 April 1992
- Running time: 149 minutes
- Country: India
- Language: Telugu

Gharana Mogudu (transl. Respected/Noble/High Class husband) is a 1992 Indian Telugu-language masala film directed by K. Raghavendra Rao. The film stars Chiranjeevi, Nagma and Vani Viswanath with Rao Gopal Rao and Kaikala Satyanarayana in supporting roles. The music was composed by M. M. Keeravani, and cinematography was handled by A. Vincent. It is a remake of the 1986 Kannada film Anuraga Aralithu.

Released on 9 April 1992, Gharana Mogudu became the first Telugu film to collect over ₹10 crore in distributor share at the box office, marking the third consecutive hit for the combination of K. Raghavendra Rao and Chiranjeevi after Jagadeka Veerudu Atiloka Sundari (1990) and Rowdy Alludu (1991). The film completed 100 days in 39 centres and its 100-day celebrations were held at Brahmananda Reddy Stadium in Guntur on 26 July 1992. It received the Filmfare Award for Best Film - Telugu and was featured at the 24th International Film Festival of India in the mainstream section.

== Plot ==
Raju (Chiranjeevi) is a do-gooder who helps his co-workers in a Visakhapatnam shipyard, but when his mother suffers a paralytic stroke, he moves back to Hyderabad and looks for a job. Uma Devi (Nagma), daughter of industrialist Bapineedu (Raogopal Rao) takes over the business from her father and helps it to reach new heights, which also sees her headstrong ways reach new heights. In this scenario, she not only rejects Ranganayakulu's (Kaikala Satyanarayana) son's marriage proposal, but insults them when the father-son duo show up at her house. To avenge the insult, they send goons to kill Uma Devi. As fate would have it, Bapineedu shows up in the car instead of Uma Devi and is rescued by Raju, who asks him for a job, which Bapineedu readily agrees to.

Raju wins over the employees in no time and takes on the high-handedness of Uma Devi and her management. This leads to constant conflict and Uma Devi decides to marry Raju, so that he will not interfere anymore. To this end, she emotionally blackmails Raju's mother and eventually makes Raju agree to marry her. But Raju continues to trouble her even after marriage. Uma Devi's secretary, Bhavani (Vani Viswanath), is also a friend of Raju, which leads to jealousy. In the meantime, Ranganayakulu, with the help of Uma Devi's manager Sarangapani (Ahuti Prasad) schemes against Uma Devi to sabotage her factory. The rest of film deals with how Raju thwarts the schemes of Ranganayakulu and teaches Uma Devi to be humble.

== Cast ==
- Chiranjeevi as Raju
- Nagma as Uma Devi (Voice Dubbed by Saritha)
- Vani Viswanath as Bhavani (Voice Dubbed by Shilpa)
- Raogopal Rao as Bapineedu
- Kaikala Satyanarayana as Ranganayakulu
- Brahmanandam as Albithri Appanna
- Sharat Saxena as Ranganayakulu's son
- Ramaprabha as Seethamma
- Shubha as Savithri
- Ahuti Prasad as Sarangapani
- Ponnambalam as Veeraiah
- Sakshi Ranga Rao as Rammurthy
- Chalapathi Rao as Chalapathi
- P. L. Narayana as Narayana
- Disco Shanti as item number in the song "Bangaru Kodi Petta"
- Gautam Raju as Yousuf
- King Kong

== Soundtrack ==
The music and background score for the film were composed by M. M. Keeravani, with lyrics provided by Bhuvanachandra and Keeravani himself.

Originally, the song "Bangaru Kodi Petta" had a different tune, but Chiranjeevi requested a more energetic, "peppy number" where he could showcase his full energy. Keeravani quickly composed a new tune at the producer's home, initially penning the lyrics as "Smuggled Goods Bandi Vachinandi." Bhuvanachandra later revised the lyrics to "Bangaru Kodi Petta," completing the writing in just half an hour.

"Bangaru Kodi Petta" was later remixed by Keeravani in the Magadheera (2009). Keeravani later reused "Hey Pilla" as "Hey Babu" for the 1996 Hindi film Is Raat Ki Subah Nahin.

Gharana Mogudu

Soundtrack album by M. M. Keeravani
- Released: 1992
- Recorded: 1992
- Genre: Soundtrack
- Length: 30:13
- Label: Lahari Music
- Producer: M. M. Keeravani

M. M. Keeravani chronology
Soorya Manasam (1992)	Gharana Mogudu (1992)	Vaaname Ellai (1992)

Telugu track listing
No.	Title	Lyrics	Performer(s)	Length
1.	"Bangaru Kodi Petta"	Bhuvanachandra	S. P. Balasubrahmanyam, K. S. Chitra	6:14
2.	"Kitukulu Thelisina"	Bhuvanachandra	K.S. Chitra, Mano	5:00
3.	"Hey Pilla Hello Pilla"	Bhuvanachandra	K.S. Chitra, Mano	4:30
4.	"Kappuko Duppati"	M. M. Keeravani	S. P. Balasubrahmanyam, K. S. Chitra	4:51
5.	"Endibe Ettaga Undhi"	Bhuvanachandra	S. P. Balasubrahmanyam, K. S. Chitra	4:37
6.	"Pandu Pandu Pandu"	Bhuvanachandra	S. P. Balasubrahmanyam, K. S. Chitra	5:01
Total length:				30:13

Malayalam Soundtrack of Hey Hero
#	Song	Lyricist	Singers
1	Eppadi Eppadi Udambu	Mankombu Gopalakrishnan	M. G. Sreekumar, K. S. Chithra
2	Kousthubham Charthi Nee	Mankombu Gopalakrishnan	M. G. Sreekumar, K. S. Chithra, Chorus
3	Pandu Pandu Pandu	Mankombu Gopalakrishnan	M. G. Sreekumar, K. S. Chithra, Chorus
4	Punnara Peda Maane	Mankombu Gopalakrishnan	M. G. Sreekumar, K. S. Chithra
5	Puthumazha Pozhiyanu	Mankombu Gopalakrishnan	M. G. Sreekumar, K. S. Chithra
6	Thenmullappanthal Ketti	Mankombu Gopalakrishnan	M. G. Sreekumar, K. S. Chithra, Chorus

== Box office ==
- Gharana Mogudu became the highest grossing Telugu film of all time, collecting a distributor share of over ₹10 crore in its initial release. It also emerged as the first South Indian movie to collect a distributor share of over ₹10 crore.
- Gharana Mogudu collected a distributor share of ₹1.35 crore in its opening week.
- The film had a 100-day run in 39 centres and a 175-day run in three centres, including a 183-day run in Sandhya 70mm, Hyderabad.
- It was dubbed in Malayalam as Hey Hero. It was successful in Kerala; it collected ₹1 crore with a distributor share of ₹0.4 crore, and it had run for 175 days in the same theatre in Trivandrum.

== Awards ==
- Filmfare Award for Best Film - Telugu - K. Devi Vara Prasad
