= Dus Numbri =

- Poster
- Directed by: Madan Mohla
- Written by: Dhruva Chatterjee; S. Ali Raza
- Produced by: Madan Mohla
- Starring: Manoj Kumar; Hema Malini; Pran; Bindu; Prem Nath; Kamini Kaushal
- Cinematography: Rajan Kinagi; Madan Sinha
- Edited by: Lachhmandass
- Music by: Laxmikant–Pyarelal
- Release date: 1976
- Country: India
- Language: Hindi

Dus Numbri (transl. Of the number 10) (Note: Dus Numbri refers to a person whose record is maintained in the No. 10 register prescribed under the rules made under the Police Act, 1861. Such person (a habitual notorious criminal or recidivist) is required by law to report at regular intervals to the local police station.) is a 1976 Indian Hindi-language film. Produced and directed by Madan Mohla, and written by S. Ali Raza and Dhruva Chatterjee, it stars Manoj Kumar, Hema Malini, Pran, Premnath, Bindu, Kamini Kaushal and Om Shivpuri. The music is by Laxmikant Pyarelal. The film was later remade into the Telugu film KD No:1 (1978).

The film was the top hit of 1976. The film ranked #9 for the 1970s decade and is also ranked #47 of all-time hits

== Plot ==
Inspector Shiv Nath is an honest and diligent police officer in Bombay, and lives with his wife, Radha, and a young son, Arjun. While making several arrests in connection with counterfeit money and drugs, he discovers that his close friend, Karamchand is also involved in this racket. Before he could take any action, he himself is arrested by the police for possession of counterfeit money and drugs, and sentenced to a jail term, but he escapes. Radha loses her mind and is institutionalized, while Arjun takes to petty crime and on reaching adulthood is the Don of the area known and feared as "Dus Numbri". He meets with and falls in love with a petty thief and card-sharp, Rosemary Fernandes. When Radha accidentally meets with Rosemary, she thinks it is Sundari, Karamchand's wife, and then Radha starts to regain her sanity. But not for long, as Arjun, Radha, and Rosemary become enmeshed in a dangerous plot.

== Cast ==
- Manoj Kumar ... Arjun
- Hema Malini ... Sundari / Rosemary Fernandes / Anupamaa
- Prem Nath ... Inspector Jaichan
- Pran ... Hawaldar Karan Singh Badshah / CBI Officer Karan Singh
- Bindu ... CBI Officer Roopa Sharma / Dilruba Dilli Wali
- Kamini Kaushal ... Radha
- Om Shivpuri ... Karamchand
- David Abraham ... Pascal (as David)
- Imtiaz Khan ... Veeru (as Imtiaz)
- Sajjan
- Abhi Bhattacharya as Inspector Shivnath: Radha's husband; Arjun's father
- Shyam Kumar
- Rammohan Sharma as Police Inspector
- Shivraj ... Psychiatrist
- Kumud Tripathi
- Rajan Haksar ... Jhangi
- Madhup Sharma
- Dev Kishan
- Hercules
- Rajan Kapoor
- V. Gopal
- Azad
- Pahelwan ... (as Pehlwan)
- C.S. Dubey
- Kamaldeep
- Keshav Rana
- Kamal
- Rajni Bala ... Dancer (Mujhe dard lagta...) (as Rajnibala)
- Raju Shrestha ... (as Master Raju)
- Kuljeet ... Truck-driver (Veeru's partner)
- Usha Thakur

== Soundtrack ==
#	Title	Singer(s)
1	"Dilruba Dilliwali"	Mukesh, Manna Dey, Asha Bhosle
2	"Mujhe Dard Rahta Hai"	Mukesh, Lata Mangeshkar
3	"Na Tum Ho Yaar Aloo"	Mukesh, Manna Dey
4	"Prem Ka Rog Bada Bura"	Lata Mangeshkar
5	"Tune Meri Jaan Bada Kam Kiya"	Lata Mangeshkar
6	"Yeh Duniya Ek Numbri"	Mukesh
