= List of Telugu films of 1962 =

This is a list of films produced by the Tollywood film industry based in Hyderabad, India in 1962.

Title	Director	Cast	Music director
Aasha Jeevulu	B. S. Ranga	J. V. Ramana Murthi, Rajasree, Relangi, Girija	Viswanathan–Ramamoorthy
Aatma Bandhuvu	P. S. Ramakrishna Rao	N. T. Rama Rao, Savitri, S. V. Ranga Rao, P. Kannamba, Sharada	K. V. Mahadevan
Appaginthalu	V. Madhusudhana Rao	Jaggayya, Jamuna, J. V. Ramana Murthi, Rajasulochana	Ghantasala
Aradhana	V. Madhusudhana Rao	A. Nageswara Rao, Savitri, Jaggayya	S. Rajeswara Rao
Bhishma	B. A. Subba Rao	N. T. Rama Rao, Anjali Devi, Kanta Rao, Haranath (actor), Vanisri, Sobhan Babu	S. Rajeswara Rao
Chitti Tammudu	K. B. Tilak	Kanta Rao, Rajasulochana, Jaggayya, Ramakrishna, Devika, Master Venkata Ramana	Pendyala Nageswara Rao
Dakshayagnam	K. B. Nagabhushanam	N. T. Rama Rao, Devika, S. V. Ranga Rao, P. Kannamba, Rajasree	S. Hanumantha Rao
Gaali Medalu	B. R. Panthulu	N. T. Rama Rao, Devika, Jaggayya, Jayanthi	T. G. Lingappa
Gulebakavali Katha	K. Kameswara Rao	N. T. Rama Rao, Jamuna	
Gundamma Katha	K. Kameswara Rao	N. T. Rama Rao, A. Nageswara Rao, Savitri, Jamuna, S. V. Ranga Rao, Suryakantam	Ghantasala
Kalimilemulu	G. Ramineedu	A. Nageswara Rao, Krishna Kumari	Aswathamma
Khaidi Kannayya	B. Vittalacharya	Kanta Rao, Rajasulochana	Rajan–Nagendra
Kula Gotralu	K. Pratyagatma	A. Nageswara Rao, Krishna Kumari, Relangi	Pendyala Nageswara Rao
Madana Kamaraju Katha	B. Vittalacharya	Kanta Rao, Haranath, Rajasree, Anuradha	Rajan–Nagendra
Mahamantri Timmarusu	K. Kameswara Rao	N. T. Rama Rao, Gummadi, S. Varalakshmi, Devika, Sobhan Babu	Pendyala Nageswara Rao
Manchi Manasulu	A. Subba Rao	A. Nageswara Rao, Savitri, Sowcar Janaki	K. V. Mahadevan
Mohini Rukmangada	K. S. Prakash Rao	Balayya, Kanta Rao, Jamuna, Krishna Kumari	K. V. Mahadevan
Nagarjuna	Y. V. Rao	Rajkumar, G. Varalakshmi, Kanta Rao	
Nuvva? Nena?	A. Seshagiri Rao	Kanta Rao, Devika	K. V. Mahadevan
Padandi Munduku	V. Madhusudhana Rao	Jaggayya, Jamuna, S. V. Ranga Rao, G. Varalakshmi	S. P. Kodandapani
Nichaya Thamboolam	B. S. Ranga	Sivaji Ganesan, Jamuna, S. V. Ranga Rao, P. Kannamba	Viswanathan–Ramamoorthy
Rakta Sambandham	V. Madhusudan Rao	N. T. Rama Rao, Savitri, Kanta Rao, Devika	Ghantasala
Siri Sampadalu	P. Pullaiah	A. Nageswara Rao, Savitri, Gummadi, Suryakantam	Master Venu
Swarna Gowri	Y. R. Swamy	Kanta Rao, Krishna Kumari	M. Venkataraju
Swarna Manjari	Vedantam Raghavayya	N. T. Rama Rao, Ramakrishna, Anjali Devi	P. Adinarayana Rao
Tiger Ramudu	C. S. Rao	N. T. Rama Rao, Rajasulochana, S. V. Ranga Rao	Ghantasala
Samrat Pruthviraj (Rani Samyukta)	Harsukh Bhatt	Paidi Jairaj, Anithaguha, Ullas	Vasant Desai, B. Gopalam
