= List of Telugu films of 1974 =

This is a list of Telugu-language films produced in the year 1974.

Title	Director	Cast	Notes
Adambaralu Anubandhalu	C. S. Rao	Krishna, Sharada	
Adapillala Tandri	K.Vasu	Krishnam Raju, Chandramohan, Bharathi, Padmapriya, Jayasudha, Nagabhushanam	Released on 7 September 1974.
Amma Manasu	K. Viswanath	Chalam, Jayanthi, Bharathi	
Ammayi Pelli	P. Bhanumathi	N. T. Rama Rao, P. Bhanumathi	
Andaru Dongale	V. B. Rajendra Prasad	Sobhan Babu, Lakshmi	
Anaganaga Oka Thandri	C. S. Rao	Krishnam Raju, Bharathi	
Alluri Seetarama Raju	V. Ramachandra Rao	Krishna, Vijaya Nirmala	
Bangaaru Kalalu	Adurthi Subba Rao	A. N. R, Lakshmi	
Bantrotu Bharya	Dasari Narayana Rao	Krishnam Raju, Chalam, Vijaya Nirmala	
Bhoomi Kosam	K. B. Tilak	Gummadi, Jaggayya, Jamuna	
Chakravakam	V. Madhusudhana Rao	Sobhan Babu, Vanisri, Chandrakala	
Dhanavanthulu Gunavanthulu	K. Varaprasad	Krishna, Vijaya Nirmala	
Deeksha	K. Pratyagatma	N. T. Rama Rao, Jamuna	
Deergha Sumangali	K. Hemandhara Rao	Krishna, Jamuna	
Devadasu	Vijaya Nirmala	Krishna, Vijaya Nirmala	
Dorababu	T. Rama Rao	A. N. R, Manjula	
Evariki Vare Yamuna Theere	Dasari Narayana Rao	Raja Baby, Roja Ramani	
Gali Patalu	T. Rama Rao	Krishna, Vijaya Nirmala	
Gowri	P. Chandra Sekhar Reddy	Krishna, Jamuna	
Gundelu Teesina Monagaadu	N. B. Chakravarthi	Kanta Rao, Jyothi Lakshmi	
Intiniti Katha	K. Satyam	Krishna, Chandrakala	
Inti Kodalu	Lakshmi Deepak	S. V. Ranga Rao, Gummadi, Krishnam Raju, Chandra Mohan, Prameela, Malathi, S. Varalakshmi	Released on 12 September 1974.
Kannavari Kalalu	S. S. Balan	Sobhan Babu, Vanisri, Latha	
Khaidi Babai	T. Krishna	Sobhan Babu, Vanisri	
Kode Nagu	K. S. Prakash Rao	Sobhan Babu, Chandrakala, Lakshmi	
Krishnaveni	V. Madhusudhana Rao	Krishnam Raju, Vanisri	
Manchi Manushulu	V. B. Rajendra Prasad	Sobhan Babu, Manjula	
Manushullo Devudu	G. V. Prasad	N. T. Rama Rao, Vanisri	
Manshulu Mati Bommalu	B. Baskar	Krishna, Jamuna	
Nippulanti Manishi	S. D. Lal	N. T. Rama Rao, Latha	
Nomu	Pattu	Ramakrishna, Chandrakala, Sarath Babu	
O Seeta Katha	K. Viswanath	Kanta Rao, Chandramohan, Roja Ramani	
Peddalu Maarali	P. Chandrasekhara Reddy	Krishna, Jamuna	
Palleturi Chinnodu	B. Vittalacharya	N. T. Rama Rao, Manjula	
Premalu Pellillu	V. Madhusudhana Rao	A. N. R, Sharada, Lakshmi	
Radhamma Pelli	Dasari Narayana Rao	Krishna, Sharada	
Ram Raheem	B. A. Subba Rao	Nandamuri Balakrishna, Nandamuri Harikrishna	
Satyaniki Sankellu	K. S. Prakash Rao	Krishna, Vanisri	
Tatamma Kala	N. T. Rama Rao	N. T. Rama Rao, P. Bhanumathi	
Thulambaram	Pendyala Naganjeneyulu	Chalam, Sharada	
Urvasi	K. Bapayya	Sanjeev Kumar, Sharada	Released on 12 December 1974.
Uthama Illalu	P. Sambasiva Rao	Krishna, Chandrakala	
