= List of Tamil films of 1961 =

Post-amendment to the Tamil Nadu Entertainments Tax Act 1939 on 1 April 1958, Gross jumped to 140 per cent of Nett Commercial Taxes Department disclosed ₹2.28 crore in entertainment tax revenue for the year.

The following is a list of films produced in the Tamil film industry in India in 1961, in alphabetical order.

== 1961 ==
Title	Director	Production	Music	Cast	Release date (D-M-Y)
Akbar	K. Asif	Sterling Investment Corporation	Naushad	Dilip Kumar, Madhubala, Prithviraj Kapoor, Durga Khote	03-03-1961 Tamil version
Arabu Naattu Azhagi; Remake of Hindi film	Homi Wadia	Film Centre, Chennai	Vijayabhasker		06-10-1961
Arasilankumari	A. S. A. Sami & A. Kasilingam	Jupiter Pictures	G. Ramanathan	M. G. Ramachandran, Padmini, Rajasulochana	01-01-1961
Anbu Magan	T. Prakash Rao	Jayalakshmi Pictures	T. Chalapathi Rao	A. Nageswara Rao, Savitri	27-01-1961
Bhagyalakshmi	K. V. Srinivasan	Narayanan & Co	Viswanathan–Ramamoorthy	Gemini Ganesan, Sowcar Janaki, E. V. Saroja	07-11-1961
Ellam Unakkaga	A. Subbarao	Saravanabhava Unity Pictures	K. V. Mahadevan	Sivaji Ganesan, Savitri, S. V. Ranga Rao	01-07-1961
Ennai Paar	G. R. Nathan	Palaniyappa Productions	T. G. Lingappa	T.R. Mahalingam, B. S. Saroja, Pandari Bai	16-06-1961
Jagathala Prathapan	K. V. Reddy	Vijaya Vauhini Studios	Pendyala Nageswara Rao	N. T. Rama Rao, B. Saroja Devi, L. Vijayalakshmi	
Kaanal Neer	P. S. Ramakrishna Rao	Bharani Pictures	P. Bhanumathi	A. Nageswara Rao, P. Bhanumathi, Sowcar Janaki	21-07-1961
Kappalottiya Thamizhan	B. R. Panthulu	Padmini Pictures	G. Ramanathan	Sivaji Ganesan, Gemini Ganesan, Savitri, S. V. Ranga Rao, Tambaram Lalitha	07-11-1961
Kongunattu Thangam	M. A. Thirumugam	Devar Films	K. V. Mahadevan	C. L. Anandan, M. R. Radha, Pushpalatha, Tambaram Lalitha	14-04-1961
Kumara Raja	G. K. Ramu	Sivakami Pictures	T. R. Pappa	J. P. Chandrababu, T. S. Balaiah, Suryakala, M. N. Rajam	21-04-1961
Kumudham	A. Subbarao	Modern Theatres	K. V. Mahadevan	S. S. Rajendran, M. R. Radha, Sowcar Janaki, C. R. Vijayakumari	29-07-1961
Maharajan Petra Maindhan; Dubbed from Telugu	B. Vittalacharya	Vittal Productions	Rajan–Nagendra	Kanta Rao, Krishna Kumari, Rajanala, Mukkamala, Balakrishnan, Srikanth, Satya Narayana	
Malliyam Mangalam	Malliyam Rajagopal	Tamil Nadu Talkies	T. A. Kalyanam	S. V. Sahasranamam, Pandari Bai, S. V. Subbaiah, Mynavathi, Lakshmi Muthuraman	
Mamiyarum Oru Veetu Marumagale	K. B. Tilak	Anubama Films	Pendyala Nageswara Rao	S. S. Rajendran, M. N. Rajam, Devika	27-04-1961
Manapanthal	V. N. Reddy	R. R. Pictures	Viswanathan–Ramamoorthy	S. S. Rajendran, S. A. Ashokan, B. Saroja Devi, E. V. Saroja	10-02-1961
Marutha Nattu Veeran	T. R. Raghunath	Saravanabhava Unity Pictures	S. V. Venkatraman	Sivaji Ganesan, Jamuna, P. S. Veerappa	24-08-1961
Naaga Nandhini	T. R. Raghunath	B. V. N. Pictures	R. Sudarsanam	Anjali Devi, K. Balaji, Devika, Sandhya, Nambiar	10-02-1961
Nagarathil Zimbo; Dubbed from Hindi	Nanubhai Bhatt		Vijaya Bhaskar	Azad, Nilofer	
Nallavan Vazhvan	P. Neelakantan	Arasu Pictures	T. R. Pappa	M. G. Ramachandran, M. R. Radha, Rajasulochana	31-08-1961
Palum Pazhamum	A. Bhimsingh	Saravana Films	Viswanathan–Ramamoorthy	Sivaji Ganesan, M. R. Radha, B. Saroja Devi, Sowcar Janaki	09-09-1961
Panam Panthiyile	K. Somu	M. A. V. Pictures	K. V. Mahadevan	S. S. Rajendran, M. R. Radha, C. R. Vijayakumari, Rajasree	07-11-1961
Pangaaligal	G. Ramakrishna	Irish Movies	S. Dakshinamurthi	Gemini Ganesan, M. R. Radha, Anjali Devi, Devika	
Panithirai	Muktha V. Srinivasan	Muktha Films	K. V. Mahadevan	Gemini Ganesan, B. Saroja Devi, K. A. Thangavelu	01-12-1961
Pasamalar	A. Bhimsingh	Rajamani Pictures	Viswanathan–Ramamoorthy	Sivaji Ganesan, Gemini Ganesan, Savitri, M. N. Rajam	27-05-1961
Paava Mannippu	A. Bhimsingh	Buddha Pictures	Viswanathan–Ramamoorthy	Sivaji Ganesan, Gemini Ganesan, M. R. Radha, Savitri, M. V. Rajamma, Devika	16-03-1961
Punar Janmam	R. S. Mani	Vijaya Films	T. Chalapathi Rao	Sivaji Ganesan, Padmini, Ragini, K. A. Thangavelu	21-04-1961
Rishya Sringar; Dubbed from Telugu	Mukkamala		T. V. Raju	Haranath, Rajasulochana, Mukkamala	
Sabaash Mapillai	S. Raghavan	Ragavan Productions	K. V. Mahadevan	M. G. Ramachandran, M.R. Radha, Malini	14-07-1961
Sri Valli	T. R. Ramanna	Narasus Studio	G. Ramanathan	Sivaji Ganesan, Padmini, J. P. Chandrababu, T. R. Mahalingam	01-07-1961
Thai Sollai Thattathe	M. A. Thirumugam	Devar Films	K. V. Mahadevan	M.G. Ramachandran, B. Saroja Devi, M. R. Radha	07-11-1961
Thayilla Pillai	L. V. Prasad	Prasad Movies	K. V. Mahadevan	Kalyan Kumar, T. S. Balaiah, M. V. Rajamma, L. Vijayalakshmi, Nagesh	18-08-1961
Thennilavu	C. V. Sridhar	Chitralaya	A. M. Rajah	Gemini Ganesan, Vyjayanthimala, K. A. Thangavelu	30-09-1961
Thirudathe	P. Neelakantan	A. L. S. Productions	S. M. Subbaiah Naidu	M.G. Ramachandran, B. Saroja Devi, K. A. Thangavelu	23-03-1961
Thooya Ullam	A. Subbarao	Annapurna Pictures Ltd.	Pendyala Nageswara Rao	A. Nageswara Rao, Savitri, K. A. Thangavelu	14-01-1961
Veerakumar; Dubbed from Telugu	B. Vittalacharya Puratchidasan	Vittal Productions	Rajan–Nagendra	Kanta Rao, Krishna Kumari, Rajanala, Satyannarayana, Meenakumari, Balakrishna	
Yar Manamagan?	P. Subramaniam	Neela Productions	Br Lakshmanan	T. K. Balachandran, V. K. Ramasamy D. Balasubramaniam, Kumari K. V. Shanthi, C. R. Rajakumari	22-09-1961
