= Thammudu (disambiguation) =

Thammudu or Tammudu (Telugu: తమ్ముడు) is a Telugu word meaning younger brother, and may refer to:

- Chitti Tammudu, a 1962 Telugu film
- Bhale Thammudu, a 1969 Telugu film
- Naa Thammudu, a 1971 Telugu film
- Thammudu, a 1999 Telugu film
- Thammudu, a 2025 Telugu film
