= Eedu Jodu =

- Theatrical release poster
- Directed by: K. B. Tilak
- Written by: S. R. Pinisetty
- Produced by: K. B. Tilak
- Starring: Jaggayya; Jamuna; Gummadi; Chalam; Manimala
- Cinematography: V. V. Ram Chowdary
- Edited by: C. H. Venkateswara Rao
- Music by: Pendyala
- Production company: Anupama Films
- Release date: 17 May 1963
- Country: India
- Language: Telugu

Eedu Jodu (transl. Lovematch) is a 1963 Indian Telugu-language film produced and directed by K. B. Tilak. The film stars Jaggayya, Jamuna, Gummadi, Chalam and Manimala. It was released on 17 May 1963 and became a commercial success. The director remade the film in Hindi in 1971 as Kangan.

== Plot ==
Shanta (Jamuna), a village next-door type, homely girl, Dr. Venu (Jaggayya) and his mother Sundaramma (Hemalatha) are coming back to their native place after years where they settled in Vizag for Venu's MBBS. Venu and Shanta are two childhood sweethearts, and their parents promised each other in their childhood to tie the knot for them when they are at the correct age. But, Sundaramma doesn't tolerate their closeness and she wants to arrange her son's marriage to Shoba (Manimala) who is well educated like Santha (younger sister of Santha), and the daughter of Rangamma (Suryakantham) and Veerayya (Chadalavada). Rangamma has a family there which includes her mother, brother Chalapathi (Ramana Reddy) and his son Anji (Chalam). Chalam has a one-sided love for his cousin Shoba; Shoba also knows it, so she challenges him to pass his graduation like her, then she will marry him. Anji accepts it. Due to the closeness of Venu and Santha, Sundaramma orders Venu to leave for Vizag, for his studies. He leaves. Sundaramma and Venu are loyal to Lakshmipathy (Gummadi), who is an alcoholic (he drinks because of his late wife's death). Chalapathi works as an assistant to Lakshmipathy. Moreover, he was a close friend of Venu's late father and helped them in their low stage. For his gratitude, Venu and his mother accept that, after completion of his course, he will practice in Sushila hospital (Lakshmipathy's wife's name, who had passed away). After Venu leaves for Vizag, Sundaramma comes to Rangamma's house to fix Venu and Shoba's marriage; therefore, Sundaramma insults Parvathamma (Santha's mother) (Malathi). Due to that insult, Parvathamma's health is totally spoiled. So, Santha writes a letter to Venu to help her. In her presence, Venu promises Parvathamma he will take care of Santha till his last breath. Parvathamma dies at last after listening to Venu's words. However, circumstances separate them again. Rangamma secretly arranges a marriage for Santha to Lakshmipathy with the help of Chalapathi. Reluctantly, Lakshmipathy also agrees to marry her because of his guru's orders. Lakshmipathy is much older than Shanta. Forcefully, at the hands of Rangamma and her brother Chalapathi, their marriage is done. Poor Venu doesn't know all this, but his mother knows it from Rangamma's letter. Santha makes Lakshmipathy promise that he won't touch alcohol any more onwards, and Lakshmipathy stops taking alcohol. When Venu comes back to his village, he is shocked by listening to Veerayya's words at Rangamma's residency, that Santha is married to Lakshmipathy. In the presence of Rangamma and Chalapathi, Venu immediately goes to Lakshmipathy's residency to ask why she broke the last wish of her late mother and the promise they gave to her. Santha ignores his questions; both insult each other for their fate. Misled by Venu, Santha slaps Venu and he leaves from there. Venu decides not to work in Lakshmipathy's hospital any more. At the request of Santha, he cancels his thought and works in Lakshmipathy's hospital. Venu ignores Shoba all the time. Slowly, Shoba also understands Venu's thoughts. At last, Lakshmipathy knows the relation of Santha and Venu, and tries to get them close again by acting sick. Santha catches his thoughts and says no to all this. Venu directly rejects Shoba and later, directly says no to Rangamma and Sundaramma that he won't marry Shoba. So, Rangamma takes this as an insult and misleads about Santha and Venu's relation. Sundaramma misunderstands Santha again and warns Santha; Lakshmipathy stops her and tells her to get lost. After this scene, Santha orders Venu to marry Shoba. Venu disagrees with Santha, but later at her request, he reluctantly accepts it. Anji knows all this from Venu's assistant Ramalingachari (Allu Ramalingaiah), that Shoba and Venu are getting married. By telling his father and grandmother, he tries to stop their marriage. Rangamma disagrees with their request. Shoba also opens up about Anji and tells her mother she wants to marry Anji. Rangamma this time also disagrees. Chalapathi opens up a secret and Lakshmipathy orders him to reveal that secret to Santha as well. Chalapathi opens up to Santha that Santha is not married; on that day, Rangamma tied the auspicious thread to Santha herself to get the help of Chalapathi by turning off the lights. This is because Lakshmipathy was not conscious as he was fully drunk, and Santha was not conscious as well because of her fate. After hearing all this, Santha is devastated and commits suicide; Lakshmipathy stops her. He convinces her to marry Venu; this time Santha accepts his request to marry Venu. Just as Rangamma played the drama by turning off the lights, Veerayya and Chalapathi turn off the lights and replace Anji in place of Venu. Anji and Shoba are married to each other with the help of Veerayya and Chalapathi. In a temple, Lakshmipathy arranges the marriage of Venu and Santha. Rangamma and Sundaramma try to stop that marriage by grouping up all the village people, to accuse Santha of already being a married woman. Rangamma and Sundaramma and the rest of the people try to stop the marriage, but they don't listen to them. Rangamma asks Venu to stop all this; he replies very arrogantly, "this is your fate." Lakshmipathy orders Rangamma to accept her mistake on behalf of the people. Rangamma accepts her mistake that on that day, she tied the auspicious thread to Santha instead of Lakshmipathy. Lakshmipathy teaches a lesson to Sundaramma and Rangamma with his words. At last, Sundaramma and Rangamma accept their mistakes and happily help with Venu and Shanta's marriage. After a lot of circumstances faced by Venu and Shanta to win their love, the film ends happily with the reunion of Venu and Santha through their marriage.

== Cast ==
- Jaggayya as Venu
- Jamuna as Santha
- Gummadi as Lakshmipathy
- Chalam as Anji
- Manimala as Sobha
- T. V. Ramana Reddy as Chalapati
- Chadalavada as Rangamma's husband
- K. V. S. Sharma as Lakshmipathy's guru
- Suryakantham as Rangamma
- Hemalatha as Sundaramma
- Malathi as Parvathamma
- Allu Ramalingaiah as Ramalingachari

== Production ==
Eedu Jodu was produced and directed by K. B. Tilak under Anupama Films, and written by S. R. Pinisetty. Cinematography was handled by V. V. Ram Chowdary, and editing by C. H. Venkateswara Rao. The film was the debut of Manimala, who played Sobha, in Telugu cinema. While some scenes were shot at Narasu Studios and Prasad Productions, Eedu Jodu was predominantly filmed in a bungalow owned by Tilak's friend, Ch. Subbarao, in Nungambakkam, Madras. The song "Idhemi Lahiri Idhemi Gaaradi" was filmed at Mahabalipuram, and K. S. Prakash Rao directed the song "Pancharu Pancharu Pancharu" at Tilak's request as Tilak had other commitments. When Tilak contracted fever, he asked his friend Pratibha Sastri to direct a scene picturised on Venu (Jaggayya) and Santha (Jamuna) to avoid production delays; Sastri agreed, and completed a day's work. A scene where Lakshmipathy (Gummadi) asks Santha to remove her mangalasutra was found to be objectionable by G. P. Sastry of the Censor Board, so it was removed and replaced with a divorce scene.

== Soundtrack ==
The soundtrack was composed by Pendyala, and the lyrics were written by Aarudra.

Track listing
No.	Title	Singer(s)	Length
1.	"Idhemi Lahiri Idhemi Gaaradi"	P. Susheela, Ghantasala
2.	"Chirugaali Vantidhi Arudaina Chinnadi" (Happy)	Ghantasala
3.	"Pancharu Pancharu Pancharu"	P. B. Sreenivas, Chorus
4.	"Vishnu Padhamu Memu Viduvamu"	Madhavapeddi Satyam, Chorus
5.	"Suryuni Chuttu Thiruguthundhi"	P. B. Sreenivas, B. Vasantha
6.	"Chirugaali Vantidhi Arudaina Chinnadi" (Sad)	Ghantasala
7.	"Lavokkinthayu Ledhu Dhairyamu Vilolambayye"	P. Susheela

== Release and reception ==
Eedu Jodu was released on 17 May 1963, and became a commercial success. The film was remade in Hindi as Kangan (1971), with Tilak again directing.
