= Keelu Bommalu =

- Poster
- Directed by: C. S. Rao
- Produced by: Parvathaneni Gangadhara Rao
- Starring: Gummadi; Jamuna; Vasanthi; Jaggayya; Kannamba
- Music by: S. P. Kodandapani
- Release date: 1965
- Country: India
- Language: Telugu

Keelu Bommalu (transl. Keyed toys) is a 1965 Indian Telugu-language film directed by C. S. Rao and produced by P. Gangadhara Rao of Hyderabad Films.

== Plot ==
The film depicts a student of religion who comes to realise that he is selfish and learns to help others.

== Cast ==
- Gummadi
- Jamuna
- Jaggayya
- Vasanthi
- Kannamba
- Mudigonda Lingamurthy

== Awards ==
- Nandi Award for Second Best Feature Film - Silver won by P. Gangadhara Rao.

== Songs ==
- "Bottu Kaatuka Pettukuni" (Singer: P. Susheela)
- "Pillanogroviga Marithira" (Singer: P. Susheela)
- "Endu Konanukonti" - Pithapuram Nageswara Rao, K. Jamuna Rani
- "Keelu Bommalu" - Ghantasala
