= Muddu Bidda =

- Poster
- Directed by: K. B. Tilak
- Screenplay by: Arudra; Tapi Dharma Rao
- Based on: Bindur Chhele by Saratchandra Chatterjee
- Produced by: K. B. Tilak
- Starring: Jamuna; Jaggayya
- Edited by: M. V. Rajan
- Music by: Pendyala
- Release date: 1956
- Country: India
- Language: Telugu

Muddu Bidda (transl. Beloved child) is a 1956 Indian Telugu-language drama film directed and produced by K. B. Tilak, in his debut. The film is based on the Bengali novel Bindur Chhele written by Saratchandra Chatterjee. Tilak remade it in Hindi as Chhoti Bahu in 1971.

== Cast ==
- Jamuna as Radha
- Jaggayya as Doctor Madhu
- V. Nagayya as Seshayya
- G. Varalakshmi
- Lakshmirajyam as Seetha
- C. S. R. Anjaneyulu as the zamindar
- Ramana Reddy
- Suryakantham

== Production ==
The film marked the debut of K. B. Tilak, who previously worked under L. V. Prasad.

== Legacy ==
The film earned Tilak a good name. Tilak and Jagayya later collaborated for M.L.A., which was successful.
