= Atha Okinti Kodale =

1958 film by K. B. Tilak

- Poster
- Directed by: K. B. Tilak
- Screenplay by: Pinisetty Sri Ramamurthy
- Story by: Barampuram Kollady
- Produced by: K. B. Tilak
- Starring: Jaggayya; Girija; J. V. Ramana Murthi; Prameela; Ramana Reddy; Hemalatha; Suryakantham; P. Lakshmikanthamma; Perumallu
- Cinematography: Lakshman Gore
- Edited by: Ch. Venkateswara Rao
- Music by: Pendyala
- Production company: Anupama Films
- Release date: 10 October 1958
- Country: India
- Language: Telugu

Atha Okinti Kodale (transl. A mother-in-law is also a daughter-in-law of another house) is a 1958 Indian Telugu-language comedy drama film produced and directed by K. B. Tilak. Based on a play by Barampuram Kollady, it features an ensemble cast consisting of Jaggayya, Girija, Ramanamurthy, Prameela, Ramana Reddy, Hemalatha, Suryakantham, P. Lakshmikanthamma and Perumallu. The film, dealing with the relationship between mothers-in-law and their daughters-in-law, was released on 12 September 1958, and became a major commercial success. It was later remade in Tamil as Mamiyarum Oru Veetu Marumagale (1961) and in Hindi as Saas Bhi Kabhi Bahu Thi (1970).

== Plot ==
Vardhi Subbarayudu, a spiritual man, is the husband of Tayaramma, an obstinate woman who dislikes her mother-in-law Parvathamma. At a temple, Tayaramma meets a woman named Sobha; impressed by her character, she decides that she is worthy of being her daughter-in-law. She is also relieved to realize that her son Raghuram and Sobha are already in love. Sobha's mother Sundaramma is ill-tempered, and disowns her daughter-in-law Lakshmi because her father Rangaiah failed to pay her the desired dowry. Sundaramma's meek son Chandram is absent-minded, and always involved in playing the fiddle, while ignoring his wife's plight. The good relationship between Sobha and Tayaramma eventually worsens and Sobha returns to her mother's home. The rest of the film deals with how Sobha and Raghu, along with Subbarayudu, pacify the shrewd Tayaramma and Sundaramma, and fix things for both families.

== Cast ==
Credits adapted from The Hindu:

- Jaggayya as Raghuram
- Girija as Sobha
- Ramanamurthy as Chandram
- Devika (Credited as Prameela) as Lakshmi
- Ramana Reddy as Vardhi Subbarayudu
- Hemalatha as Tayaramma
- Suryakantham as Sundaramma
- P. Lakshmikanthamma as Parvathamma
- Perumallu as Rangaiah
- Chadalavada as Kotaiah
- Sita as Mangi

== Production ==
Atha Okinti Kodale is based on a play by Barampuram Kollady. Film producer-director K. B. Tilak hired Pinisetty Sri Ramamurthy to convert Kollady's play into a screenplay. Ch. Venkateswara Rao served as editor, Lakshman Gore was the cinematographer, B. Chalam handled art direction and B. Sathyam was co-director. K. Bapayya worked as an assistant director, in addition to making a cameo appearance as a friend of Raghuram (Jaggayya).

== Soundtrack ==
The soundtrack was composed by Pendyala, and the lyrics were written by Aarudra. Songs that attained popularity were "Asokavanamuna Sita" (sung by P. Susheela), "Jodugulla Pistholu Thaa" (Ghantasala), "Paila Paila Pacheesu" and "Rammante Vachchanu Ammayi Garu" (both sung by P. B. Sreenivas and Jikki), "Mayadaari Keesulaata" (Pithapuram Nageswara Rao and Swarnalatha) and the poem "Buddhochenaa Neeku Manasaa" rendered by Madhavapeddi Satyam.

== Release and reception ==
Atha Okinti Kodale was released on 12 September 1958, and became a major commercial success. The film was remade by Tilak in Tamil as Mamiyarum Oru Veetu Marumagale (1961), which did not achieve the same success. It was later remade by Vasu Menon in Hindi as Saas Bhi Kabhi Bahu Thi (1970).
