= Deeksha =

1974 film directed by Kotayya Pratyagatma

- Theatrical release poster
- Directed by: K. Pratyagatma
- Written by: K. Pratyagatma (screenplay/dialogues)
- Story by: R. K. Dharma Raju
- Produced by: Koganti Kutumba Rao; Vajje Subba Rao
- Starring: N. T. Rama Rao; Jamuna
- Cinematography: P. S. Prakash
- Edited by: P. Srihari Rao
- Music by: Pendyala Nageswara Rao
- Production company: Sri Padmaja Films
- Release date: 26 November 1974
- Country: India
- Language: Telugu

Deeksha (transl. Initiation) is a 1974 Indian Telugu-language drama film, produced by Koganti Kutumba Rao and Vajje Subba Rao under the Sri Padmaja Films banner and directed by K. Pratyagatma. It stars N. T. Rama Rao, Jamuna, and music composed by Pendyala Nageswara Rao.

== Cast ==
- N. T. Rama Rao as Raja
- Jamuna as Rani
- Jaggayya as Ramayya
- Prabhakar Reddy as Jagannatham
- Raja Babu as Brahmanandam
- Sakshi Ranga Rao as Adiseshayya
- Chalapathi Rao
- Anjali Devi as Shanthamma
- Pushpa Kumari
- K. Vijaya as Kamala

== Soundtrack ==
Deeksha

Film score by Pendyala Nageswara Rao
- Released: 1974
- Genre: Soundtrack
- Length: 22:10
- Producer: Pendyala Nageswara Rao

Music composed by Pendyala Nageswara Rao.

S. No.	Song Title	Lyrics	Singers	length
1	"Nanna Ane Rendu"	Dasaradhi	Ghantasala, S. Janaki	4:07
2	"Poolamme Pillochhindi"	C. Narayana Reddy	P. Susheela	4:40
3	"Merise Meghamalika"	C. Narayana Reddy	S. P. Balasubrahmanyam	3:24
4	"Saradaga Santhakelithe"	Kosaraju	Madhavapeddi Ramesh, L. R. Eswari	3:12
5	"Raka Raka"	Kosaraju	Vani Jayaram	2:41
6	"Bul Bul Beauty Vayyari"	Kosaraju	Ghantasala	4:06
