= Marumalarchi (1956 film) =

1956 Indian film by K. S. Prakash Rao

- Theatrical release poster
- Directed by: K. S. Prakash Rao; Lanka Sathyam
- Screenplay by: (Dialogues) S. A. Subburaman; B. Nageswara Rao
- Story by: T. B. Dharma Rao; S. A. Subburaman
- Produced by: C. V. Reddy
- Starring: Sriram; G. Varalakshmi; M. N. Nambiar; E. V. Saroja
- Cinematography: Jagheerdar; R. R. Chandran; Mukundhan
- Edited by: Veerappan; Marthandam
- Music by: Pendyala
- Production company: Ananda Productions
- Release date: 16 November 1956
- Country: India
- Language: Tamil

Marumalarchi (transl. Re-awakening) is a 1956 Indian Tamil-language film directed by K. S. Prakash Rao and Lanka Sathyam. The film stars Sriram and G. Varalakshmi. It was released on 16 November 1956.

== Cast ==
List adapted from the database of Film News Anandan and from the book Thiraikalanjiyam.

Male cast

- Sriram
- M. N. Nambiar
- E. R. Sahadevan

Female cast

- G. Varalakshmi
- E. V. Saroja
- T. M. Meenakshi

== Production ==
The film was produced by C. V. Reddy and was directed by K. S. Prakash Rao and Lanka Sathyam. Story was by T. B. Dharma Rao and S. A. Subburaman while the dialogues were written by S. A. Subburaman and B. Nageswara Rao. Cinematography was handled by Jagheerdar, R. R. Chandran and Mukundhan while the editing was done by Veerappan and Marthandam. Art direction was by Kotwanker and Choreography was handled by Vempatti Sathyam. Still photography was done by Sathyam. The film was also produced in Telugu with the title Melukolupu.

== Soundtrack ==
Music was composed by Pendyala while the lyrics were penned by M. S. Subramaniam.

Song	Singer/s
"Vaana Veedhi Thannil"	T. M. Soundararajan
"Naanum Oru Manithanaa"	A. M. Rajah & P. Leela
"Kaiyum Kaalum Nallaa"	Pendyala Nageswara Rao
"Manam Ariyaadha Peraanandham"	A. P. Komala & Jikki
"Therinjadhukkellaam"	K. Rani
"Idhuthaanaa Paarin"	Ghantasala
"Vaadhithadhu Undhan Thavaruthaanaa"	P. Leela
"Maalaiyidhe Nalla Verlaiyidhe"	A. M. Rajah & Jikki
