= J. V. Ramana Murthi =

Indian actor

- Born: 20 May 1933; Srikakulam, Andhra Pradesh, India
- Died: 22 June 2016 (aged 83); Hyderabad, Telangana, India
- Other name: Apara Girisam
- Occupation: Actor
- Years active: 1957–2015
- Notable work: Kanyasulkam
- Relatives: J. V. Somayajulu (brother)
- Awards: Nandi Awards

Jonnalagadda Venkata Ramana Murthi (20 May 1933 – 22 June 2016) was an Indian actor known for his works in Telugu cinema, and Telugu drama. Murthi made his film debut with K. B. Tilak's sociopolitical film M.L.A. in 1957. Subsequently, he starred in about one fifty feature films in a variety of roles, and has received the Nandi Natakotsavam Award for Life Achievement in theater and drama.

== Personal life ==
He was born on 20 May 1933 in Narasannapeta,Srikakulam district, Murthi held a degree in science, Murthi was the younger brother of J. V. Somayajulu. Before making his foray into theatre and films, Murthi has worked in academics as a senior lecturer.

== Theatre ==
He got the best performance award for Vishwa Shanti of Aatreya in Inter University Competition. He acted in many plays such as N.G.O., Evaru Donga, Kappalu, Natakam, Keerthi Seshulu, Kaala Rathri, Phani and Katamraju Katha and toured the state. His most notable performance is Gireesham in Kanyasulkam of Gurajada Appa Rao. He directed the production and appeared in a record number of performances.

== Death ==
Murthi died on 22 June 2016 due to cardiac arrest in Hyderabad, India. He was 83 when he died. He was hospitalized.

== Selected filmography ==
=== Telugu films ===
Year	Film	Role	Notes
1957	M.L.A.		
1958	Manchi Manasuku Manchi Rojulu	Dr. Raghu	
1958	Mangalya Balam	Dr. Suryam	
1958	Atha Okinti Kodale	Chandram	
1959	Sabhash Ramudu	Inspector Mohan	
1961	Batasari	Brother of Madhavi	
1961	Bava Maradallu		
1962	Aasa Jeevulu		
1971	Amayakuralu		
1976	Siri Siri Muvva		
1977	Jeevithamlo Vasantham	Sripathy	
1978	Dongala Dopidi	Munasabu Kishtaiah	
1978	Patnavasam	Rajashekharam	
1978	Katakataala Rudraiah		
1978	Maro Charitra	Balu's father	
1978	Kalanthakulu	Anand Rao	
1978	Sahasavanthudu	C.I.D. Officer Prathap	
1979	Gorintaku		
1979	Guppedu Manasu		
1979	Maavari Manchitanam		
1979	Idi Katha Kaadu		
1979	Sri Rama Bantu	Ramadasu	
1980	Subhodayam		
1980	Sivamethina Satyam	Chakrapani	
1980	Prema Tarangalu		
1980	Konte Mogudu Penki Pellam	Ranganatham	
1980	Mahalakshmi	Village priest	
1980	Pelli Gola	Purushottama Rao	
1980	Kodalu Vastunaru Jagratha	Subbaramaiah	
1980	Rakta Bandham		
1981	Srirasthu Subhamasthu		
1981	Aakali Rajyam	Jonnalagadda Venkata Ramanayya Panthulu	
1981	Gadasari Atta Sogasari Kodalu	Damodaram	
1981	Sapthapadi	Avadhani, son of Yajulu	
1981	Prema Natakam	Sambamurthy, Sarada's father	
1981	Alludugaru Zindabad	Major Nookaraju	
1982	Vamsa Gouravam	Jagannatham	
1982	Subhalekha	Jagannatham	
1982	Pagabattina Simham		
1983	Andhra Kesari	Hanumantharao Naidu	
1983	Mugguru Ammayila Mogudu		
1983	Simhapuri Simham		
1983	Kalyana Veena		
1984	Ananda Bhairavi		
1984	Kanchana Ganga		
1985	Shri Datta Darshanam		
1985	Lady James Bond		
1985	Jwala		
1985	Srivaru	Lawyer Ramana Rao	
1985	Kongumudi		
1986	Ugra Narasimham	S.P. Ramana Murthi	
1986	Chadastapu Mogudu		
1986	Sirivennela		
1987	Naku Pellam Kavali		
1987	Parasakthi		
1987	Daada		
1988	Illu Illalu Pillalu		
1988	Ukku Sankellu		
1988	Bazaar Rowdy		
1989	Simha Swapnam		
1989	Manchivaaru Maavaaru		
1989	Joo Laka Taka	Rangachari	
1990	Karthavyam	Principal Ramakrishna	
1991	Edu Kondalaswamy		
1991	Kobbari Bondam		
1993	Peddinti Ammayi		
1995	Alibaba Adbhuta Deepam	Sarma	
1997	W/o V. Vara Prasad		
2002	Lagna Patrika		
2003	Simhachalam	Election Commissioner	
2004	Arya		
2006	Maayajaalam		
2007	Shankar Dada Zindabad		
2007	Lakshmi Kalyanam		
2013	Thummeda		

=== Other language films films ===
Year	Film	Role	Language	Notes
1979	Nool Veli	Vidya's father	Tamil	
1980	Savithri		Tamil	
1982	Moondram Pirai	Ayurvedic practitioner	Tamil	
1982	Shriman Shrimati		Hindi	
1982	Ente Mohangal Poovaninju		Malayalam	
1992	Unnai Vaazhthi Paadugiren	Priya's father	Tamil	
1999	Time	Shop owner	Tamil	

=== Television ===
Year	Serial	Role	Channel	Language	Notes
1999	Kathiravan		Sun TV	Tamil	
2012	Aahaa		Star Vijay	Tamil	
