= Maavari Manchitanam =

- Theatrical release poster
- Directed by: B. A. Subba Rao
- Written by: Gollapudi (dialogues)
- Screenplay by: B. A. Subba Rao
- Story by: Nihar Ranjan Gupta
- Based on: Do Anjaane
- Produced by: A. Pundarikakshaiah
- Starring: N. T. Rama Rao; Vanisri
- Cinematography: M. A. Rehman
- Edited by: Kandaswamy
- Music by: Master Venu
- Production company: Sri Bhaskara Chitra
- Release date: 9 March 1979
- Country: India
- Language: Telugu

Maavari Manchitanam (transl. My Husband's Goodness) is a 1979 Indian Telugu-language drama film, produced by A. Pundarikakshaiah and directed by B. A. Subba Rao. It stars N. T. Rama Rao and Vanisri, with music composed by Master Venu. The film is a remake of the Hindi film Do Anjaane (1976), itself based on the novel Ratrir Yatri by Nihar Ranjan Gupta.

== Cast ==
- N. T. Rama Rao
- Vanisri
- Jaggayya
- Gummadi
- Padmanabham
- Nutan Prasad
- Ramana Murthy
- Chaya Devi
- Pushpalatha
- Baby Rohini

== Soundtrack ==
Maavari Manchitanam

Film score by Master Venu
- Released: 1979
- Genre: Soundtrack
- Producer: Master Venu

Music composed by Master Venu. Lyrics were written by C. Narayana Reddy.

S. No.	Song title	Singers	length
1	"Enthakaina Taginavadavera"	P. Susheela	
2	"Mee Manchitanaaniki"	S. P. Balasubrahmanyam, P. Susheela	
3	"Chenchita Vedale Vetaku"	V. Ramakrishna, P. Susheela, Anand, Kovela Shantha	
4	"Kanna Kanna"	S. P. Balasubrahmanyam	
5	"Yadanunchi Vundi Padado"	P. Susheela	
6	"Amma Donga"	S. P. Balasubrahmanyam, S. P. Sailaja	
