= Sravanthi Juluri =

Indian visual artist, painter and actress

- Born: 1980 (age 45–46); Hyderabad, India
- Education: Stain Glass Garden Studio
- Known for: Painting
- Notable work: The Journey of a Butterfly; Jaago Sthree
- Spouse(s): Rahul Reddy (div, 2012)
- Children: 1
- Parent(s): Juluri Ramana Rao (father); Jamuna (mother)

Sravanthi Juluri is an Indian visual artist, painter and actress, known for executing vibrantly colored spiritual narrative paintings, and glass art in a modified style; as well as television. She is the daughter of veteran Tollywood actress Jamuna. Sravanthi was trained at Stained Glass Garden Studio and Mountain View academy in Berkeley, California, U.S.

== Personal life ==
Sravanthi Juluri was born in Hyderabad, India into the family of veteran Tollywood actress Jamuna. She did her schooling from NASR, and Intermediate from Villa Marie in Hyderabad. Sravanthi holds Bachelor of Arts from B. R. Ambedkar University. She performed as a child artist in television series “Veera Satrajit”, and “Dr. Mamatha” for Doordarshan. She is married to Rahul Reddy in 2009, the couple have a Son Avish. The couple divorced in 2012.
