= Paruvu-Prathishta =

- Theatrical release poster
- Directed by: Manapuram Appa Rao
- Written by: Samudrala Jr. (dialogues)
- Screenplay by: Manapuram Appa Rao
- Story by: Manapuram Appa Rao
- Produced by: Jupudi Venkateswara Rao
- Starring: N. T. Rama Rao; Anjali Devi
- Cinematography: Kamal Ghosh
- Edited by: B. Gopal Rao
- Music by: Pendyala Nageswara Rao
- Production company: Valta Productions
- Release date: 9 May 1963
- Country: India
- Language: Telugu

Paruvu-Prathishta (transl. Honour-Prestige) is a 1963 Indian Telugu-language drama film, produced by Jupudi Venkateswara Rao and directed by Manapuram Appa Rao. It stars N. T. Rama Rao and Anjali Devi, with music composed by Pendyala Nageswara Rao.

== Cast ==
- N. T. Rama Rao as Raghu
- Anjali Devi as Susheela
- Relangi as Venkat
- Rajanala as Narendra
- Gummadi Rao Bahadoor Prakasam
- Satyanarayana as Ranga
- Chalam as Venu
- Mikkilineni as Parandhamaiah
- Raja Babu
- Krishna
- Amarnath as Judge
- Kakarala
- Jagga Rao
- Kannamba as Parvathi
- Suryakantham as Durgamma
- Chayadevi as Shanthamma
- Girija as Dr. Karuna

== Soundtrack ==
Paruvu-Prathishta

Film score by Pendyala Nageswara Rao
- Released: 1963
- Genre: Soundtrack
- Length: 21:13
- Label: EMI Columbia Audio
- Producer: Pendyala Nageswara Rao

Music was composed by Pendyala Nageswara Rao.

S. No.	Song title	Lyrics	Singers	length
1	"Vinu Vinu"	Aarudhra	Ghantasala, P. Susheela	3:37
2	"Prabhu Giridhari"	Rajasri	P. Susheela	3:34
3	"Aa Mabbu Teralalona"	Sri Sri	Ghantasala, P. Susheela	4:12
4	"Ela Ela Jeevitam"	Sri Sri	Ghantasala	3:19
5	"Kanulundi Chudalenu"	C. Narayana Reddy	P. Susheela	3:40
6	"Aa Mabbu Teralalona" (Pathos)	Sri Sri	P. Susheela	2:51
