= Chadalavada (actor) =

Indian actor

Chadalavada Kutumba Rao
- Died: 1968
- Occupations: Comedian and Character actor
- Years active: 1940s – 1960s

Chadalavada Kutumba Rao, popularly known as Chadalavada (died 1968), was a Tollywood actor well known for his comedian roles. He appeared in many Telugu films. The prominent among them are: Aada Paduchu, Appu Chesi Pappu Koodu, Bharya Bharthalu, Jayabheri, Krishna Leelalu (1959), Maya Bazaar, Palletooru, Parivartana, Pelli Naati Pramanalu, Sri Krishnarjuna Yudham (1963), Thirupathamma Katha (1963) and Thodi Kodallu.

He started acting in dramas initially. He entered the Telugu cinema field in 1951. He had a familiar accent and was also a jovial personality.

He died in 1968.

== Filmography ==
1. Tahsildar (1944)
2. Swargaseema (1945)
3. Mana Desam (1949) as Madhu
4. Pelli Chesi Choodu (1952)
5. Palletooru (1952) (actor and playback singer)
6. Pitchi Pullaiah (1953)
7. Vayyari Bhama (1953)
8. Parivartana (1954) as Pichi vaadu
9. Nirupedalu (1954)
10. Peddamanushulu (1954) as Seshavataram
11. Annadata (1954)
12. Kanyasulkam (1955) as Polisetti
13. Santhanam (1955)
14. Ardhangi (1955)
15. Santosham (1955) as Avatharam
16. Charana Daasi (1956) as Hanumanthu
17. Sonta Ooru (1956)
18. Todi Kodallu (1957) as Tirupati
19. Maya Bazaar (1957) as Lambu
20. Sankalpam (1957) as Lakshmaiah
21. Aada Pettanam (1958)
22. Dongalunnaru Jagratha (1958)
23. Anna Thammudu (1958) as Brahmandam
24. Sri Krishna Maya (1958)
25. Pelli Naati Pramanalu (1958)
26. Appu Chesi Pappu Koodu (1958) as Chenchaiah
27. Atha Okinti Kodale (1958)
28. Jayabheri (1959) as Dappula Raghavulu
29. Pelli Sandadi (1959)
30. Krishna Leelalu (1959)
31. Banda Ramudu (1959)
32. Bala Nagamma (1959)
33. Nammina Bantu (1960)
34. Kuladaivam (1960)
35. Maa Babu (1960) as Ramu
36. Bhaktha Sabari (1960)
37. Bharya Bharthalu (1961)
38. Taxi Ramudu (1961)
39. Chitti Tammudu (1962)
40. Siri Sampadalu (1962) as Anjaiah
41. Savati Koduku (1963)
42. Eedu Jodu (1963)
43. Sri Tirupatamma Katha (1963)
44. Sri Krishnarjuna Yudham (1963) as Manchi Budhi
45. Marmayogi (1964) as Bairagi
46. Aathma Balam (1964) as Anand's father
47. Aastiparulu (1966) as Miriyala Parathpara Rao
48. Navarathri (1966)
49. Dr. Anand (1966) as Kotayya
50. Kanchu Kota (1967)
51. Pattukunte Padivelu (1967)
52. Prana Mithrulu (1967)
53. Bhama Vijayam (1967)
54. Aada Paduchu (1967) as Sukhalu
55. Lakshmi Nivasam (1968)
