= Bandipotu Dongalu =

- Theatrical release poster
- Directed by: K. S. Prakash Rao
- Written by: N. R. Nandi (dialogues)
- Screenplay by: K. S. Prakash Rao
- Story by: K. S. Prakash Rao
- Produced by: J. Subba Rao, G. Rajendra Prasad
- Starring: Akkineni Nageswara Rao; Jamuna; S. V. Ranga Rao
- Cinematography: S. Venkataratnam
- Edited by: K. A. Marthand
- Music by: Pendyala Nageswara Rao
- Production company: Madhavi Pictures
- Release date: 11 March 1969
- Running time: 149 mins
- Country: India
- Language: Telugu

Bandipotu Dongalu (transl. Dacoits) is a 1969 Indian Telugu-language action film, produced by J. Subba Rao and G. Rajendra Prasad, and directed by K. S. Prakash Rao. It stars Akkineni Nageswara Rao, Jamuna, S. V. Ranga Rao with music composed by Pendyala Nageswara Rao.

== Cast ==
- Akkineni Nageswara Rao as Krishna / Kanna
- Jamuna as Indira / Indu
- S. V. Ranga Rao as Mallu Dora
- Gummadi as Dr. Chandra Shekar
- Jaggayya as Naagu
- Nagabhushanam as Varaha Murthy
- Rajababu as Anji
- Prabhakar Reddy as Police officer
- Mukkamala
- Tyagaraju as Papanna
- K. V. Chalam as Mr. America
- Kanchana as Malli
- Suryakantham as Sundaramma
- Raja Sulochana as Dancer
- Rama Prabha
- Jayanthi as Lakshmi
- Rukmini as Yashoda
- Meena Kumari

== Soundtrack ==
Bandipotu Dongalu

Film score by Pendyala Nageswara Rao
- Released: 1969
- Genre: Soundtrack
- Length: 30:07
- Label: Pendyala Nageswara Rao

Music composed by Pendyala Nageswara Rao.

S. No.	Song title	Lyrics	Singers	length
1	"O Kannayya Puttina Roju"	Sri Sri	Ghantasala, P. Susheela, J. V. Raghavulu	6:14
2	"Vinnanule Priya Kanugonnanule Priya"	C. Narayana Reddy	Ghantasala, P. Susheela	5:09
3	"Kiladi Donga Diyo Diyo" (M)	Aarudhra	Ghantasala	3:59
4	"Kiladi Donga Diyo Diyo" (F)	Aarudhra	P. Susheela	3:27
5	"Unnadu Oka Chakkani Chinnodu"	Dasaradhi	P. Susheela	4:12
6	"Virisina Vennelavo"	Dasaradhi	Ghantasala	3:40
7	"Gandara Ganda"	Aarudhra	P. Susheela, L. R. Eswari	3:26

== Awards ==
- K. S. Prakash Rao won Nandi Award for Best Story Writer (1969)
