= Chhoti Bahu =

Chotti Bahu
- DVD cover
- Directed by: K. B. Tilak
- Written by: Raj Baldev Raj
- Story by: Sarat Chandra Chattopadhyay
- Based on: Muddu Bidda (1956); Bindur Chhele by Sarat Chandra Chattopadhyay
- Starring: Sharmila Tagore; Rajesh Khanna; Nirupa Roy
- Music by: Kalyanji Anandji
- Release date: 1971
- Country: India
- Language: Hindi

Chhoti Bahu is a 1971 Hindi drama film produced by Seeru Daryani and Darius Gotla, the film is directed by K. B. Tilak and written by Raj Baldev Raj.

The film stars Sharmila Tagore, Rajesh Khanna, Nirupa Roy and I. S. Johar. The music is by Kalyanji Anandji. The film was successful at the box office and particularly noted for Sharmila Tagore's performance as a layered female protagonist.

The movie was based on the 1913 Bengali novel Bindur Chhele written by the famous Bengali author Saratchandra Chatterjee. This film is counted among the 17 consecutive hit films of Rajesh Khanna between 1969 and 1971, by adding the two-hero films Maryada and Andaz to the 15 consecutive solo hits he from 1969 to 1971.

Initially, Saira Banu was to star as the female lead, but she withdrew a few days into filming due to illness.

== Plot ==
Radha (Sharmila Tagore) was the only daughter of a rich merchant. She has epilepsy, triggered especially by the removal of a little doll she always carries with her. Madhu (Rajesh Khanna) was a young doctor, practicing in a village. He lives along with his older brother Shriram (Tarun Bose) and sister-in-law Sita (Nirupa Roy). A local unqualified medical practitioner, whose business got a big hit by the practice of Madhu, begrudgingly arranges a match between Madhu and Radha, hiding her illness. Madhu marries her without knowing the problem she has.

Immediately after the wedding, Madhu and his family members come to know of Radha's illness and they accept her as wedding has already taken place. After seeing that Radha's attack subsided with the touch of Gopi (son of Shriram and Sita), Sita lets her have him herself. Radha feels so happy and starts taking care of Gopi as her own son.

Years pass and Gopi, now seven years old, grows up thinking of Radha as his mother. Things go well till Madhu and Shriram's sister Paro comes along with her husband and son to stay with them. Her son Niku (Mehmood Jr.), with his playful attitude, spoils Gopi too, much to the worry of Radha. Later, Paro starts misunderstandings between Radha and Sita, that go to a bigger level because of Radha's innocence and Sita's indolence. Moreover, Paro frightens little Gopi that if he sees his mother, she would die. Frightened Gopi stays away from Radha, much to the agony of Radha. Gradually, she falls ill and her condition becomes critical. While everyone is puzzled by Gopi's behavior, Niku carefully extracts the reason for his behavior. He tells that to everyone. Everyone scolds Paro and convinces Gopi that his mother wouldn't die if he talks to her. Gopi comes to Radha and her illness goes away. Even bitterness between Radha and Sita goes away and they start living together happily as before.

== Cast ==
- Sharmila Tagore as Radha
- Rajesh Khanna as Madhu
- Shashikala as Paro
- Nirupa Roy as Sita
- I. S. Johar as Premnath (Niku's dad)
- Sarika as Gopi
- Mehmood Junior as Niku
- Master Suraj
- Tarun Bose as Shriram
- Shivraj as Radha's Father
- P. Jairaj as Rajaram Ramprasad Bahadur
- Satyendra Kapoor as Vedji Avtar
- Radhika Rani
- Irshad Panjatan as Servant
- Chandrima Bhaduri as Ganga
- Master Ratan

== Soundtrack ==
#	Title	Singer(s)
1	"He Re Kanhaiya"	Kishore Kumar
2	"Are Ghar Ko Mat Godam Bana"	Hemlata
3	"Dulhaniya Bata De Ri"	Asha Bhosle, Usha Khanna
4	"Munne Raja"	Lata Mangeshkar
5	"O Maa Meri Maa"	Lata Mangeshkar
6	"Ye Raat Hai Pyasi Pyasi"	Mohammed Rafi
