= Pendyala (composer) =

Background information
- Born: Pendyala Nageswara Rao; 6 March 1917
- Origin: Vanukuru, Penamaluru mandal, Krishna district, India
- Died: 31 August 1984 (aged 67)
- Genre: Indian film scores
- Occupation: Composer
- Instruments: Harmonium; Tabla; Dholak; Mrudangam; Flute; Electric guitar Piano; Violin
- Years active: 1934–1984

Pendyala Nageswara Rao (6 March 1917 – 31 August 1984), known mononymously by his surname Pendyala, was an Indian composer, multi-instrumentalist, conductor, and music producer known for his works predominantly in Telugu cinema along with Tamil and Kannada films.

== Early life and career ==
He was born at Vanukuru near Vijayawada and later shifted to Katur. He was closely associated with Mikkilineni as they were students of Kapilavai Ramanatha Sastry.

His ancestors, including his father Sitaramaiah, were music exponents. Nageswara Rao also showed interest in music from childhood. He used to accompany his father who played the harmonium for dramas and learned techniques to play it from the age of 13. He acted for the first time as Jambavati in Krishna Tulabharam play. He later played Rukmini, Narada characters in Tulabaram play along with Jonnavitula Sheshagiri, Rshyendramani, Lakshmirajyam and got the applause of the viewers.

During that period Kadaru Nagabhushanam seeing his talents, invited to him to work in his orchestra for Talli Prema (1941) film. He went to Madras and joined Rajarajeswari Films and worked as assistant director to Dinakar Rao and S V Venkataraman for that film. With the beginning of Second World War he returned home. Later he was invited by Gudavalli Ramabrahmam to work for Mayalokam as Harmonist under Gali Penchala Narasimha Rao. K. S. Prakash Rao gave him the independent music director change for his film Drohi, which brought him good fame. He has provided music for about 100 films some of them are memorable hits.

Pendyala is "Bhinna Sangeeta Sampradaya Vishesha Praveenajnudu" (Expert in Natakam Padya, Gadya aalaapana(Drama Poetry singing), Hari Katha, Burra Katha, Janapada/Lok Sangeet)) in addition to traditional Hindustani and Carnatic music styles. Pendyala Composition for Kalidasa Poem "Manikya Veena Mupaalalayanti" in 1960 film Mahakavi Kalidasu, and "Jayeebhava Vijayeebhava" from 1977 film Daana Veera Soora Karna are few examples to measure his calibre. Pendyala composed "Shringar Ras" (Romantic Duet) "Chitram Hai Bhalare Vichitram" Song for Character Duryodhana from Daana Veera Soora Karna film without hampering his Monarchy "Roudra Ras" for which he is known for. Rare combination made reality. Pendyala tune for "Evaro Vastaarani Edo Chestarani" song from film Bhoomi Kosam aimed at social message and equality philosophy, but in a different unique tone from regular mode. His Versatality is visible in song "Naa Peru Bikari Naa Daari Edaari" from 1976 film "Shri Rajeshwari Vilas Coffee Club" as with simple Harmonium he could elevate scene mood and character.

Pendyala would always follow norms, rules of Raga's basis time and situation of song in his film compositions. Similar to song "San Sanna Sanna Sanna, Jao Re O Pavan" from film Sampoorna Ramayana which was composed in Raga chandrakauns depicting isolation, loneliness (intended situation for Raga chandrakauns) of Sita at Ashoka vanam in Lanka,

Pendyala always respected Raga Lakshanam (Properties) in his compositions.

Always used appropriate Raga's for his tunes.

His Composition "Sivasankari Sivanandalahari" from film Jagadeka Veeruni Katha composed in Raga Darbari Kanada justifies time and situation for that raga which remained magnanimous all-time hit in film compositions. Pendyala had kept faith in an Idiom "Raasi kante Vaasi mendu" (Reputation is important/better than numbers). People also had laid their belief in an Idiom "Gangi Govu Ksheeramu Garitadaina Chalunu" (Holy Cow Milk a Spoonful is Enough)

== Filmography ==
Year	Film	Language	Director	Banner	Notes
1948	Drohi	Telugu	L. V. Prasad		Debut film
1950	Modati Raatri	Telugu	K. S. Prakash Rao	Prakash Productions	
1950	Vaali – Sugreeva	Telugu	Jampanna	Asoka's	Gali Penchala Narasimha Rao, Master Venu, Ghantasala & S. Rajeswara Rao
1951	Deeksha	Telugu	K. S. Prakash Rao	Prakash Productions	
1951	Anni	Tamil	K. S. Prakash Rao	Prakash Productions	
1953	Kanna Talli	Telugu	K. S. Prakash Rao	Prakash Productions	Introduced P. Susheela
1953	Petrathai	Tamil	K. S. Prakash Rao	Prakash Productions	Remake of Kanna Talli
1954	Baalanandam	Telugu	K. S. Prakash Rao	Prakash Productions	
1954	Jyothy	Telugu	Sridhar & Tilak	Navayuga Pictures	
1954	Menarikam	Telugu	Jampana	Nandhi Productions	
1954	Kudumbam	Tamil	Jampana	Nandhi Productions	
1955	Ante Kavali	Telugu	K. S. Prakash Rao	Prakash Productions	
1955	Donga Ramudu	Telugu	K. V. Reddy	Annapurna Studios	
1956	Thiruttu Raman	Tamil	K. V. Reddy	Annapurna Studios	
1956	Melukolupu	Telugu	K. S. Prakash Rao	Prakash Productions	
1956	Marumalarchi	Tamil	K. S. Prakash Rao	Prakash Productions	
1956	Muddu Bidda	Telugu	K. B. Tilak	Anupama Films	
1957	Akka Chellelu	Telugu	Sarvabhowma-Amanulla	Sharwani	
1957	Bhagya Rekha	Telugu	B. N. Reddy	Ponnaluri Brothers Pvt Ltd	
1957	Rayara Sose	Kannada	R. Ramamurthy & K. S. Murthy	Sri Panduranga Productions	with R. Diwakara
1957	M.L.A.	Telugu	K. B. Tilak	Anupama Chitra	
1957	M.L.A.	Tamil	K. B. Tilak	Anupama Chitra	
1957	Soubhagyavathi	Tamil	Jampana	Nandhi Pictures	with M. S. Gnanamani
1958	Atha Okinti Kodale	Telugu	K. B. Tilak	Anupama Films	
1958	Ganga Gouri Samvadam	Telugu	V. N. Reddy	Vijayagopal Production	
1958	Shree Krishna Gaarudi	Kannada	Hunsur Krishnamurthy	Nandi Pictures	
1958	Sri Krishna Garudi	Telugu	Hunsur Krishnamurthy	Nandi Pictures	
1958	Sree Ramanjaneya Yuddham	Telugu	Acharya	Kasinadh Productions	
1958	Veettukku Vandha Varalakshmi	Tamil	B. N. Reddy	Ponnaluri Brothers Pvt Ltd	
1959	Jayabheri	Telugu	P. Pullaiah	Sarada Productions	
1959	Kalaivaanan	Tamil	P. Pullaiah	Sarada Productions	
1959	Naan Valartha Thangai	Tamil	Ch. Narayanamurthy	Saravanabhava Unity Pictures	
1959	Soubhagyavati	Telugu	Jampana	Nandhi Pictures	
1960	Bhakta Sabari	Telugu	Ch. Narayanamurthy	Sukhibhava Films	
1960	Bhakta Sabari	Tamil	Ch. Narayanamurthy	Sukhibhava Films	
1960	Bhakta Sabari	Kannada	Ch. Narayanamurthy	Sukhibhava Films	
1960	Bhatti Vikramarka	Telugu	Jampana	Nandhi Productions	
1960	Patti Vikramathithan	Tamil	Jampana	Nandhi Productions	
1960	Mahakavi Kalidasu	Telugu	Kamalakara Kameswara Rao	Sarani Productions	
1960	Sri Venkateswara Mahatyam	Telugu	P. Pullaiah	Padmasri Pictures	Silver Jubilee; Musical film
1960	Srinivasa Kalyanam	Tamil	P. Pullaiah	Padmasri Pictures	
1961	Bava Maradallu	Telugu	P. A. Padmanaba Rao	Krishna Chitra	
1961	Jagadeka Veeruni Katha	Telugu	K. V. Reddy	Vijaya Productions	
1961	Jagathalaprathapan	Tamil	K. V. Reddy	Vijaya Productions	
1961	Jagadekaveerana Kathe	Kannada	K. V. Reddy	Vijaya Productions	
1961	Krishna Prema	Telugu	Adurthi Subbarao	Mahendra Pictures	
1961	Mamiyarum Oru Veetu Marumagale	Tamil	K. B. Tilak	Anupama Films	
1961	Vagdanam	Telugu	Acharya Aatreya	Kavitha Chitra	
1961	Velugu Needalu	Telugu	Adurthi Subba Rao	Annapurna Studios	
1961	Thooya Ullam	Tamil	Adurthi Subba Rao	Annapurna Studios	
1962	Chitti Tammudu	Telugu	K. B. Tilak	Poorna Pictures	Film based on Oliver Twist
1962	Mahamantri Timmarusu	Telugu	Kamalakara Kameswara Rao	Vauhini Studios	
1963	Anuragam	Telugu	G. Ramineedu		
1963	Eedu Jodu	Telugu	K. B. Tilak	Anupama Films	
1963	Paruvu-Prathishta	Telugu	M. Appa Rao	Valta Productions	
1963	Sri Krishnarjuna Yudham	Telugu	K. V. Reddy	Jayanthi Pictures	
1963	Sri Krishnarjuna Yudham	Tamil	K. V. Reddy	Jayanthi Pictures	
1964	Ramudu Bheemudu	Telugu	Tapi Chanakya	Suresh Productions	
1964	Sabhash Suri	Telugu	I. N. Murthy	R. R. Pictures	
1965	Prachanda Bhairavi	Telugu	C. S. R. Rao		
1965	Prameelarjuneeyam	Telugu	M. Mallikarjuna Rao	S. R. Movies	
1965	Satya Harishchandra	Kannada	K. V. Reddy	Vijaya Productions	
1965	Satya Harishchandra	Telugu	K. V. Reddy	Vijaya Productions	
1965	Uyyala Jampala	Telugu	K. B. Tilak	Anupama Chitra	
1966	Srikakula Andhra Maha Vishnu Katha	Telugu	A. K. Sekhar	Sri Sambhu Films	
1966	Sri Krishna Tulabharam	Telugu	Kamalakara Kameshwara Rao	Suresh Productions	
1968	Bandipotu Dongalu	Telugu	K. S. Prakash Rao	Madhavi Pictures	
1968	Bhagya Chakram	Telugu	K. V. Reddy	Jayanthi Pictures	
1968	Gramadevatalu	Telugu	C. S. Rao	Sudhni Pictures	
1968	Panthalu Pattimpulu	Telugu	K. B. Tilak	Sri Sambhu Films	
1968	Papa Kosam	Telugu	G. V. R. Seshagiri Rao	Vijaya Suresh Combines	
1968	Uma Chandi Gowri Shankarula Katha	Telugu	K. V. Reddy	Vijaya Productions	
1970	Maa Nanna Nirdhoshi	Telugu	K. V. Nandana Rao	Mahalakshmi Movies	
1970	Pelli Sambandham	Telugu	K. Varaprasad Rao	Praveena Pictures	
1971	Manasu Mangalyam	Telugu	K. Pratyagatma	Uttama Chitra	
1971	Ananda Nilayam	Telugu	B. S. Narayana	Mercury Cine Productions	
1971	Naa Tammudu	Telugu	K. S. Prakash Rao	S. B. R. Pictures	
1971	Sri Krishna Satya	Telugu	K. V. Reddy	R. K. Brothers	
1971	Sri Krishna Vijayamu	Telugu	Kamalakara Kameswara Rao	Kaumudi Art Pictures	
1972	Mathru Murthy?	Telugu	Manapuram Apparao	Vishwajyoti Pictures	
1972	Sampurna Theerthayatra	Telugu		Rupesh Films	
1974	Bhoomi Kosam	Telugu	K. B. Tilak	Anupama	
1974	Deeksha	Telugu	K. Pratyagatma	Sri Padmaja Films	
1974	Dhanavanthulu Gunavanthulu	Telugu	K. Varaprasad Rao	Devi Arts	
1974	Kode Nagu	Telugu	K. S. Prakash Rao	Kowmudi Pictures	
1976	Kolleti Kapuram	Telugu	K. B. Tilak	SH Movies	
1976	Sri Rajeswari Vilas Coffee Club	Telugu	Chakrapani & Bapu	Vijaya Productions	
1976	Suprabhatam	Telugu	K. S. Prakash Rao	Model Productions	
1976	Vemulawada Bheemakavi	Telugu	D. Yoganand	Ramakrishna Studios	
1977	Daana Veera Soora Karna	Telugu	N. T. Rama Rao	Ramakrishna Studios	
1977	Chanakya Chandragupta	Telugu	N. T. Rama Rao	Ramakrishna Studios	
1977	Koyilamma Kusindi	Telugu	Y. R. Babu	Balaji Art Pictures	
1978	Sati Savitri	Telugu	B. A. Subba Rao	Lalitha Siva Jyothi Studios	
1978	Sri Rama Pattabhishekam	Telugu	N. T. Rama Rao	Ramakrishna Studios	
1979	Gali Vaana	Telugu	Aadhiraju Anandmohan	Surendra Arts	
1979	Sri Tirupati Venkateswara Kalyanam	Telugu	N. T. Rama Rao	Ramakrishna Studios	
1979	Priya Bandhavi	Telugu	Dorai	Sripati Films	
1980	Kotha Vennela	Telugu	Jayashyam	Mayur Enterprises	
1980	Srushti Rahasyalu	Telugu	Pratap	Sri Venkata Sai Pictures	
1982	Dharma Vaddi	Telugu	K. B. Tilak	Rupachitra Kalamandir	
1982	Puramdara Dasu	Telugu	R. Ramamurthy		with K. Subrahmanyam
1985	Kalaaranjani	Telugu	K. Babu Rao		
1987	Prema Deepalu	Telugu	C. S. Bose		
