= Sankalpam (1957 film) =

- Theatrical release poster
- Directed by: C. V. Ranganatha Das
- Written by: Pinisetty (dialogues)
- Screenplay by: C. V. Ranganatha Das
- Story by: Raave
- Produced by: C. V. Ranganatha Das
- Starring: N. T. Rama Rao; Kusuma Kumari
- Cinematography: K. S. Prasad
- Edited by: Akkineni Sanjeevi
- Music by: Susarla Dakshinamurthi
- Production company: Sadhana Films
- Release date: 16 May 1957
- Running time: 148 mins
- Country: India
- Language: Telugu

Sankalpam (transl. Will / Determination) is a 1957 Telugu-language drama film, produced and directed by C. V. Ranganatha Das under the Sadhana Films banner. It stars N. T. Rama Rao and Kusuma Kumari, with music composed by Susarla Dakshinamurthi.

== Cast ==
- N. T. Rama Rao as Raghu
- Kusuma Kumari as Lakshmi
- Relangi as Shankaram
- Ramana Reddy as Papaiah
- R. Nageswara Rao as Kondalu
- Chadalavada as Lakshmaiah
- Allu Ramalingaiah as Blade
- Suryakantham as Durgamma
- Rajasulochana as Bhama
- Girija as Suguna
- Doraswamy as Gopaiah
- Master Babji as Gopi
- Dr. Sivaramakrishnaiah as Jail Superintendent
- Boddapati as Rich old man interested in Suguna

== Soundtrack ==
Sankalpam

Film score by Susarla Dakshinamurthi
- Released: 1957
- Genre: Soundtrack
- Length: 24:43
- Producer: Susarla Dakshinamurthi

Music was composed by Susarla Dakshinamurthi. Lyrics were written by Anisetty.

S. No.	Song title	Singers	length
1	"Aaliki Magade Vashamayye"	Pithapuram	3:21
2	"Kanugeeti Piliche"	P. Leela, Susarla Dakshinamurthi	2:40
3	"Ee Vayasu Sogasu"	Jikki	2:47
4	"Vennala Chalikanthulalo"	Susarla Dakshinamurthi	2:57
5	"Naavikaa Naduparaa Naava"	Panigrahi	2:38
6	"Nidurapoora"	R. Balasaraswathi Devi	1:20
7	"Thappudu Panulu"	Pithapuram, Susarla Dakshinamurthi	3:30
8	"Naa Aasalanni"	R. Balasaraswathi Devi	3:20
