= Bhatti Vikramarka =

1960 film

- Theatrical release poster
- Directed by: Jampana
- Story by: Anisetty
- Produced by: P. V. V. Satyanarayana Murthy
- Starring: N.T. Rama Rao; Anjali Devi; Kanta Rao
- Cinematography: Adi M. Irani
- Edited by: N. M. Shankar
- Music by: Pendyala Nageswara Rao
- Production company: P.V.V.S.M. Productions
- Release date: 28 September 1960
- Running time: 176 mins
- Country: India
- Language: Telugu

Bhatti Vikramarka (transl. Bhatti and Vikramarka) is a 1960 Indian Telugu-language swashbuckling adventure film, produced by P. V. V. Satyanarayana Murthy under the P.V.V.S.M. Productions banner and directed by Jampana. It stars N. T. Rama Rao, Anjali Devi, Kanta Rao and music composed by Pendyala Nageswara Rao. It is a commercial hit film that ran for 100 days. The film was dubbed into Tamil as Patti Vikramathithan.

== Cast ==
- N. T. Rama Rao as Vikramarka Maharaju
- Anjali Devi as Prabhavathi Devi
- Kanta Rao as Bhatti
- S. V. Ranga Rao as Mantra Siddha
- Relangi as Tirakasu
- Nagabhushanam as Prachandudu
- Mikkilineni as Indra
- Mukkamala
- Balakrishna as Konangi
- Kanchana as Goddess Kali
- Girija as Arakasu
- Sandhya
- Seeta as Champa
- T. D. Kusalakumari as Dancer

== Soundtrack ==
Bhatti Vikramarka

Film score by Pendyala Nageshwara Rao
- Released: 1960
- Genre: Soundtrack
- Producer: Pendyala Nageshwara Rao

=== Telugu Songs ===
Music composed by Pendyala Nageshwara Rao. Lyrics were written by Anisetti. Music released on Audio Company.

S. No	Song title	Singers	length
1	"Jaire Jambhaire Okasari"	Madhavapeddi Satyam, Jikki	3:36
2	"Kannepilla Sogasu Choodu"	Jikki	4:06
3	"Kommulu Thirigina Magavaru"	Jikki	2:30
4	"Manasaara Preminchinaara"	P. Suseela, A. P. Komala	3:38
5	"Natinchana Jagalane Jayinchana"	P. Leela, P. Susheela	4:18
6	"Ninu Nammi"	Ghantasala	3:30
7	"O Nelaraja Vennela Raja"	Ghantasala, P. Susheela	3:41
8	"O Saila Sutha Mataa"	Jikki	7:05
9	"O Sundari Andame Vindura"	P. Suseela	2:53
10	"Satyamayaa Guruda Nityamayaa"	Madhavapeddi Sathyam	3:31
11	"Chaturbhuje Chandrakala"	Ghantasala	1:33
12	"Vinta Aina Vidhi Vilasam"	Ghantasala	2:54

=== Tamil Songs ===
Music composed by T. M. Ibrahim. Lyrics were written by . Playback singers are Seerkazhi Govindarajan, S. C. Krishnan, P. Leela, Jikki, P. Susheela, A. P. Komala & S. Janaki.

S.No	Song title	Singers	Lyrics	Duration (mm:ss)
1	Kaathali En Paingkili	S. C. Krishnan & S. Janaki	Putatchidasan	03:08
2	Kannipen Ennai	Jikki		04:06
3				
4	Madhanaa En Premai	P. Leela & A. P. Komala		03:38
5				
6				
7	Oh Ezhil Raaja	Seerkazhi Govindarajan & P. Susheela		03:41
8				
9	Oho Sundharaa	P. Susheela		02:53
10				
11				
12				

== Production ==
There was fire Accident on the sets of Narasu Studios, Guindy, Madras on 13 March 1959. The Bhatti Vikramarka shooting required a fire, and a fire was made by using petrol and straw. Mukkamala and Anjali Devi were on the sets. The bamboo setting was ablaze and the flames rose high fast. The fire spread to the adjacent sets too and caused a huge damage of a lakh and half rupees. It took them for more than 90 minutes for the fire brigades to bring the fire under control. This was the worst fire disaster in the history of Telugu cinema.
