= Do Anjaane =

- Directed by: Dulal Guha
- Written by: Shafiq Ansari; Nabendu Ghosh; Nihar Ranjan Gupta
- Based on: Ratrir Yatri by Nihar Ranjan Gupta.
- Produced by: Tito
- Starring: Amitabh Bachchan; Rekha; Prem Chopra
- Cinematography: M. Rajaram
- Edited by: Bimal Roy
- Music by: Kalyanji Anandji
- Production company: Navjeevan Films
- Release date: 26 November 1976
- Country: India
- Language: Hindi

Do Anjaane (transl. Two Strangers) is a 1976 Hindi-language drama film, produced by Tito, it is directed by Dulal Guha and based on the story Rater gari of Nihar Ranjan Gupta. The film stars Amitabh Bachchan, Rekha, Prem Chopra, Pradeep Kumar, Utpal Dutt, Lalita Pawar and a young pre-stardom Mithun Chakraborty. The music is by Kalyanji Anandji. It was remade in Telugu as Maavari Manchitanam (1979). The Kannada version Aaseya Bale was released in 1987.

== Synopsis ==
Amit (Amitabh Bachchan) is found wounded on railway tracks, and when he awakens he has no memory of who he is and doesn't remember anything about his life. Six years later, he is living with a wealthy couple who have adopted him as their son and is now named Naresh Dutt.

After yet another accident in his Naresh Dutt avatar, Amit begins to regain his memory of his wife, Rekha Roy (Rekha). He finds out that she is now a very successful film actress, having changed her name to Sunita Devi, and her manager is none other than Ranjit Mallik (Prem Chopra), who was once Amit's best friend.

In flashbacks, he remembers that his real name is Amit Roy and Ranjit was the one who attempted to kill him six years earlier by throwing him off the train he was travelling on with Rekha. Amit also discovers that his young son, now 10 years old, has been sent to a boarding school and sets out a plan to regain custody of his son. First, however, he plans on taking revenge against Ranjit. Amit comes up with a plan to re-enter Rekha and Ranjit's lives by disguising himself as a film producer. He meets with Rekha and Ranjit and offers Rekha the opportunity to act in his new film titled Raater Gaadi. Rekha and Ranjit grow suspicious of Naresh Dutt as they start to realise that he bears a striking resemblance to Rekha's supposedly deceased husband Amit Roy and the story line of his film eerily mirrors Rekha's past life. Ranjit attempts to kill Amit Roy but instead Amit call police and when Ranjeet shoots bullets on Amit police arrests Ranjit.

In the end, Amit is shown going Mumbai on plane with his son. After some days Amit comes back to Rekha's home with his parents. They are reunited.

== Cast ==
- Amitabh Bachchan as Amit Roy / Naresh Dutt
- Rekha as Rekha Roy/Sunita Devi
- Prem Chopra as Ranjit Mallik
- Utpal Dutt as Mr Sanyal
- Master Laddu as young Mithun Roy
- Master Lucky as old Mithun Roy
- Pradeep Kumar as Mr Sumesh Dutt
- Urmila Bhatt as Mrs Dutt
- Lalita Pawar as Amit's Neighbour
- Mithun Chakraborty as Ghanti (Amit's neighbour)
- Anup Kumar as Amit's co-worker
- Nipon Goswami as Doctor
- Abhi Bhattacharya as Padre
- Jagdish Raj as Doctor
- Jagdeep as Dance master
- Raj Mehra as Mr. Mukherjee
- Brahmchari as Amit's office friend
- Yasmin as Mary

== Soundtrack ==
| # | Title | Singer(s) |
|---|---|---|
| 1 | "Aai Karke Singaar" | Lata Mangeshkar |
| 2 | "Kahin Door Mujhe Jana Hai" | Lata Mangeshkar |
| 3 | "Luk Chhip Luk Chhip Jao Na (Male)" | Kishore Kumar |
| 4 | "Luk Chhip Luk Chhip Jao Na (Duet)" | Kishore Kumar, Shivangi Kolhapure |

== Awards ==
- Prem Chopra won the Filmfare Best Supporting Actor Award, the only win for the film.
