= Pratibimbalu =

- Theatrical release poster
- Directed by: K. S. Prakash Rao; Singeetham Srinivasa Rao
- Screenplay by: Singeetham Srinivasa Rao
- Produced by: Jagarlamudi Radhakrishna Murthy
- Starring: Akkineni Nageswara Rao; Jayasudha; Tulasi
- Music by: K. Chakravarthy
- Production company: Vishnu Priya Cine Combines
- Release date: 5 November 2022
- Country: India
- Language: Telugu

Pratibimbalu is a 2022 Indian Telugu-language romantic drama film directed by K. S. Prakash Rao and Singeetham Srinivasa Rao. The film stars Akkineni Nageswara Rao, Jayasudha, and Tulasi. Originally ready for release in 1980, the film was released after a forty year delay.

== Plot ==
Sudha, a college student, is challenged by her friends to transform a flower-seller into a sophisticated man. While she accepts the challenge and educates him, Sudha eventually realises that the man was actually Dr. Ravi, who was pranking her. Sudha falls in love with Ravi but ends up marrying the groom suggested by her parents. Why she followed through with that decision forms the rest of the story.

== Cast ==
- Akkineni Nageswara Rao as Dr. Ravi
- Jayasudha
- Tulasi as Sudha
- Gummadi
- Annapurnamma
- Harish Kumar
- Kantha Rao

== Production ==
Production began in 1982 but was halted after Akkineni Nageswara Rao went to the United States for treatment after getting a heart attack. Although Nageswara Rao was insistent to complete the film two years later, the production of the film did not continue due to financial reasons.

== Soundtrack ==
The music was composed by K. Chakravarthy.

Track listing
No.	Title	Singer(s)	Length
1.	"Vandanamo Ragasudha Rasa Chandanamo Priya Vandanamo"	S. Janaki, P. Jayachandran
2.	"Priya Swagatam Ide Neevu"	S. P. Balasubrahmanyam, P. Susheela
3.	"Chirunavvu Nidanta Sigapuvvu Nadanta Jatna Kulikundamu"	S. P. Balasubrahmanyam, P Susheela
4.	"Manisikoka Roopam Manisikoka Roopam"
5.	"O Vidhi Enduki Natakam Endukila Markavi Jatakamu"	S. P. Balasubrahmanyam
6.	"Kuddu Pettado"

== Release and reception ==
The film was released on 5 November 2022 after being remastered in 2K HD resolution. Srivathsan Nadadhur from OTTPlay wrote, "Prathibimbaalu isn't the 'golden standard' among ANR's films though it remains extremely watchable due to the treatment and the performances. It's a film that'll be in the history books not for its quality but for the fact that someone had the conviction to release it in theatres 40 years after it was made".
