= Vamsee Juluri =

Professor of media studies (born 1969)

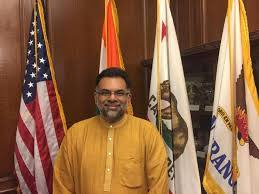
- Juluri in 2018
- Born: 1969 (age 56–57); Hyderabad, Andhra Pradesh, India
- Occupations: Professor of Media Studies, University of San Francisco

Academic background
- Education: University of Massachusetts (PhD)

Academic work
- Discipline: Media Studies and Communication

Vamsee Juluri (born 1969) is a professor of media studies at the University of San Francisco. He has been described by scholars as promoting "Hindutva propaganda."

== Family ==
Juluri was born in Hyderabad in 1969. His mother was the Telugu film actress Jamuna, and his father was Juluri Ramana Rao, a professor of zoology.

== Career ==
Juluri studied at the University of Massachusetts Amherst and received a PhD in 1999. He has written for several publications including Times of India, Huffington Post, and The Indian Express. His research interest is in the globalization of media audiences with an emphasis on Indian television and cinema, mythology, religion, violence and Gandhian philosophy. He has published several papers and essays analyzing recurring themes in Bollywood, such as tradition and violence.

Juluri advocated for preservation of references to "India" over the replacement term "South Asia" in the 2016–17 California textbook controversy over South Asian topics.

== Reception ==
Juluri's work has received a mixed reception. Scholars have praised his work on cinema as "thought-provoking". Other scholars have criticized how Juluri "constructs a monolithic Hindu agency, communicatively inverting decolonization to craft the fiction of Hindus under attack, framed as the victims of Hinduphobia" and noted that "existing exhaustive literature on the concept of Hindu nationalism challenges Juluri’s proposition regarding a potentially biased media research."

== Books ==
=== Essays ===
- Becoming a Global Audience: Longing and Belonging in Indian Music Television, New York : Peter Lang, 2003, 155 p.
- Bollywood Nation: India Through Its Cinema, New Delhi : Penguin Books India, 2013, 211 p.
- Rearming Hinduism: Nature, Hinduphobia, and the Return of Indian Intelligence, Chennai : Westland ltd, 2015, 229 p.
- Nine Days in Kishkindha: A Memoir about Hanuman, Hampi and My Father, Kindle Edition, 2018, 116 p.
- Writing Across a Cracked World: Hindu Representation and the Logic of Narrative, Kindle Edition, 2018, 255 p.

=== Novels ===
- The Mythologist, New Delhi : Penguin Books, 2010, 271 p.
- Saraswati's Intelligence (The Kishkindha Chronicles, #1), Chennai : Westland Ltd., 2016, 327 p.
- The Firekeepers of Jwalapuram (The Kishkindha Chronicles, #2), Kindle Edition, 2020, 328 p.
