= Aaseya Bale =

1987 film

- Directed by: Raj Kishore
- Written by: Dulal Guha
- Produced by: Sharada Shastry; S. V. Prasad
- Starring: Vishnuvardhan; Nalini; Jai Jagadish
- Cinematography: B. S. Basavaraj
- Edited by: Goutham Raju
- Music by: Vijaya Bhaskar
- Production company: SS Productions
- Release date: 1987
- Running time: 148 min
- Country: India
- Language: Kannada

Aaseya Bale is a 1987 Indian Kannada drama film, directed by Raj Kishor. The film featured Vishnuvardhan, Nalini and Jai Jagadish in pivotal roles. The music was composed by Vijaya Bhaskar, to the lyrics of Chi. Udaya Shankar and R. N. Jayagopal.

The film, produced by SS Productions, was a remake of the Hindi film Do Anjaane (1976) which was based on the Bengali novel Ratrir Yatri by Nihar Ranjan Gupta.

== Cast ==
- Vishnuvardhan
- Nalini
- Jai Jagadish
- Lokanath
- Dinesh
- Seetharam
- Lakshman
- Shanthamma
- Umesh
- Saikumar
- Master Nirmal
- Master Arjun

== Soundtrack ==
Aseya Bale

Soundtrack album by Vijaya Bhaskar
- Genre: Feature film soundtrack
- Label: Lahari Music

Vijaya Bhaskar composed the soundtrack. The album consists of five tracks.

S. No.	Song title	Singer(s)	Lyricist
1	"Nanna Nalle Muddu Nalle"	S. P. Balasubrahmanyam, Vani Jairam	Chi. Udaya Shankar
2	"Sarisaati Yaariharu"	Vani Jairam	Chi. Udaya Shankar
3	"Elliruve Elliruve"	S. P. Balasubrahmanyam, Vani Jairam	Chi. Udaya Shankar
4	"Kanna Mucche"	S. P. Balasubrahmanyam	R. N. Jayagopal
5	"Kanna Mucche" (sad)	S. P. Balasubrahmanyam, B. R. Chaya	R. N. Jayagopal
