= Velugu Needalu =

Velugu Needalu Thooya Ullam
- Theatrical release poster
- Directed by: Adurthi Subba Rao
- Written by: Acharya Aatreya (Telugu dialogues); C. V. Sridhar (Tamil dialogues)
- Screenplay by: Adurthi Subba Rao
- Produced by: D. Madhusudhana Rao
- Starring: Akkineni Nageswara Rao; Savitri
- Cinematography: P. S. Selvaraj
- Edited by: M. S. Mani
- Music by: Pendyala Nageshwara Rao
- Production company: Annapurna Pictures
- Distributed by: Navayuga Films
- Release date: 7 January 1961
- Running time: 178 minutes
- Country: India
- Languages: Telugu; Tamil

Velugu Needalu (transl. Light and Shadows) is a 1961 Telugu-language film produced by D. Madhusudhana Rao under the Annapurna Pictures banner and directed by Adurthi Subba Rao. It stars Akkineni Nageswara Rao and Savitri, with music composed by Pendyala Nageswara Rao.

The film was simultaneously filmed in Tamil as Thooya Ullam (transl. Pure Heart).

== Cast ==
The Tamil cast list is adapted from the book Thiraikalanjiyam Part2

Telugu

- Akkineni Nageshwara Rao as Chandram
- Savitri as Suguna
- S. V. Ranga Rao as Rao Bahadur Venkataramaiah
- Jaggayya as Dr. Raghunath
- Relangi as Vengalappa
- Padmanabham as Medical Student
- Peketi Sivaram as Sivaram
- Suryakantham as Kanaka Durgamma
- Girija as Varalakshmi
- Rajasulochana as Special appearance in song Padavoyi Bharateeyuda
- E. V. Saroja as Special appearance in song Sariganchu Cheerakatti
- Sandhya as Subhadramma
- T. G. Kamala Devi as Santhamma
- Surabhi Kamalabai
- Mohana as Nurse

Tamil
Male cast

- Akkineni Nageshwara Rao
- S. V. Ranga Rao
- K. A. Thangavelu
- K. Balaji
- Natarajan
- Nagarathinam
- Mani
- Dharmaraj

Tamil
Female cast

- Savitri
- E. V. Saroja
- M. S. Sundari Bai
- Sandhya
- Surabhi Kamalabai
- T. G. Kamaladevi
- Baby Sasikala
- Mohana
- Rajeswari

== Production ==
Velugu Needalu was simultaneously filmed in Tamil as Thooya Ullam, with K. A. Thangavelu replacing Relangi. Thooya Ullam is the first film that was screened in Shanti Theatre, Chennai. While C. V. Sridhar wrote the dialogues for the film, K. S. Gopalakrishnan who later became a popular director, taught the cast to render the dialogues.

== Soundtrack ==
Music composed by Pendyala Nageswara Rao.

Telugu

Song title	Lyrics	Singers	Length
"Haayi Haayigaa Jaabilli"	Sri Sri	Ghantasala, P. Susheela	4:20
"Paadavoyi Bharatheeyuda"	Sri Sri	Ghantasala, P. Susheela	5:55
"Challani Vennela"	Sri Sri	P. Susheela, Jikki	2:56
"Oh Rangayo Poola Rangayo"	Sri Sri	Ghantasala, P. Susheela	3:32
"Kala Kaanidi"	Sri Sri	Ghantasala	3:57
"Sariganchu Cheerakatti"	Kosaraju	Ghantasala, P. Susheela	3:57
"Bhale Bhale"	Sri Sri	Ghantasala, Madhavapeddi Satyam	4:09
"Chitti Potti Chinnari"	Sri Sri	P. Susheela, Swarnalatha	3:06
"Siva Govinda Govinda"	Kosaraju	Madhavapeddi Satyam & Udutha Sarojini	3:23

Tamil

Udumalai Narayana Kavi and Kannadasan wrote the lyrics.

Song	Singer/s	Lyricist	Length
"Thesamengum Viduthalai Vizha"	T. M. Soundararajan, P. Susheela & group	Kannadasan	06:28
"O Velappaa, Thanga Velappaa"	T. M. Soundararajan, P. Susheela & group	Udumalai Narayana Kavi	
"Kaaleju Maanavar Vaazhkkaiyile"	T. M. Soundararajan, S. C. Krishnan & group	Udumalai Narayana Kavi	
"Om Nama Paarvathi Pathe .. Pillaiye Illennaa"	S. C. Krishnan & Udutha Sarojini	Udumalai Narayana Kavi	
"Indha Pazhasa Avuththup Pottu"	T. M. Soundararajan, P. Susheela	Udumalai Narayana Kavi	03:33
"Inba Logajothi Roobam Poley"	T. M. Soundararajan, P. Susheela	Udumalai Narayana Kavi	02:53
"Inbam Serumaa, Thunbam Theerumaa"	Ghantasala	Udumalai Narayana Kavi	
"Valarum Kalaiyin Paalmathi"	P. Susheela & Jikki	Udumalai Narayana Kavi	03:13
"Kanne Kanne Unnai Thodum"	P. Susheela & Swarnalatha	Udumalai Narayana Kavi	
