= M.L.A. (1957 film) =

- Directed by: K. B. Tilak
- Produced by: K. B. Tilak
- Starring: Jaggayya; Savitri
- Music by: Pendyala
- Release date: 19 September 1957
- Country: India
- Language: Telugu

M.L.A. is a 1957 Indian Telugu-language political satire film directed and produced by K. B. Tilak starring Jaggayya and Savitri.

== Cast ==
- Jaggayya as Dasu
- Savitri as Nirmala
- Gummadi as Damodaram
- J. V. Ramana Murthi as Ramesh
- Girija as Kamala
- Ramana Reddy
- Suryakala as Leela
- Perumallu as Bhushaiah
- Nagabhushanam as Papaiah

== Production ==
The film marked the onscreen debut of J. V. Ramana Murthi, who previously worked as a stage actor. The film was shot in Prakash Studios and Venus Studios in Madras (now Chennai) and Mahabubabad, where the election campaign scenes were canned.

== Soundtrack ==
The music was composed by Pendyala. The lyrics were written by Arudra and Koganti Gopalakrishnaiah. The songs "Nee Aasa Adiyaasa" and "Idenandi Idenandi Bhagyanagaramu" were popular. This film marked the debut of playback singer S. Janaki after Vidhiyin Vilayattu, her first Tamil film, was not released.

- "Sarasulu Chathurulu Saahasavanthulu" - P. Susheela
- "Kotalo Nee Seetekkadunnadi"
- "Guttuga Maa Maata Vinavayyaa"
- "Mathrudesamunaku Pareekshadinamidi"
- "Nee Aasa Adiyaasa" - S. Janaki, Ghantasala
- "Idenandi Idenandi Bhagyanagaramu" - S. Janaki, Ghantasala
- "Jami Chettu Meeda Nunna Jaathi Ramachiluka" - A. M. Rajah
- "Namo Namo Bapu Maaku Nyaya Margame Choopu" - Madhavapeddi Satyam, P. Susheela

== Release ==
M.L.A. was screened for then chief minister Neelam Sanjiva Reddy and politicians Kasu Brahmananda Reddy and P. V. Narasimha Rao. When Russians visited Madras, the film was screened for them, and the film was sent to USSR (now Russia). The film was also sent to South Yemen (now Yemen) with English subtitles written by Sri Sri. The film was a success, which was also attributed to its soundtrack.
