= Mamiyarum Oru Veetu Marumagale =

- Poster
- Directed by: K. B. Tilak
- Written by: Udhayakumar (dialogues)
- Story by: Barampuram Kollady
- Produced by: D. V. Rao; K. Balaramaiah; K. B. Tilak
- Starring: S. S. Rajendran; M. N. Rajam; Devika
- Music by: Pendyala Nageswara Rao
- Production company: Anupama Films
- Release date: 27 April 1961
- Running time: 3:06:24 (16777 ft.)
- Country: India
- Language: Tamil

Mamiyarum Oru Veetu Marumagale (transl. A mother in-law is also a daughter in-law) is a 1961 Indian Tamil-language film comedy drama film directed by K. B. Tilak. The film stars S. S. Rajendran and M. N. Rajam. Based on a play by Barampuram Kollady, it is a remake of the director's own Telugu film Atha Okinti Kodale. The film was released on 27 April 1961.

== Cast ==
The list is adapted from the book Thiraikalanjiyam Part 2.

Male cast

- S. S. Rajendran
- K. Balaji
- V. K. Ramasamy
- S. V. Subbaiah
- Sayeeram

Female cast

- M. N. Rajam
- Devika
- M. Saroja
- C. K. Saraswathi
- S. N. Lakshmi

== Production ==
The film was produced by D. V. Rao, K. Balaramaiah and K. B. Tilak under the banner Anupama Films. K. B. Tilak directed the film while the screenplay and dialogues were penned by Udhayakumar. The film was remade from the Telugu film Atha Okinti Kodale by the same director.

== Soundtrack ==
Music was scored by Pendyala Nageswara Rao while the lyrics were penned by A. Maruthakasi.

Song	Singer/s	Length
"Selvamelaam Kodukkum Thirumagalaam"	C. S. Jayaraman	
"Pillai Kutti Petruviddaal"	C. S. Jayaraman	
"Bhudhdhiyum Vandhathaa Sollu"	C. S. Jayaraman	
"Baila Baila Cycle"	Sirkazhi Govindarajan, Jikki & group	3:04
"Vaavendru Sonnadhum Vandhaayee"	Sirkazhi Govindarajan & Jikki	3:17
"Asoka Vanamadhil Seethai"	P. Susheela	2:47
"Sodhanai Eno Pedhaiyin Meedhu"	P. Susheela	3:03
"Vetti Vambu Engalukkul"	S. C. Krishnan & A. G. Rathnamala	
"Kundu Potta Revolver Naan"	Ghantasala	2:58
