= Jagadekaveeruni Katha =

- Theatrical release poster
- Directed by: K. V. Reddy
- Screenplay by: K. V. Reddy
- Story by: Pingali Nagendra Rao
- Dialogue by: Pingali Nagendra Rao
- Produced by: K. V. Reddy
- Starring: N. T. Rama Rao; B. Saroja Devi
- Cinematography: Marcus Bartley
- Edited by: Kalyana Sundaram
- Music by: Pendyala Nageswara Rao
- Production company: Vijaya Productions
- Release date: 9 August 1961
- Running time: 187 minutes
- Country: India
- Language: Telugu

Jagadekaveeruni Katha (transl. Story of the universal hero) is a 1961 Indian Telugu-language fantasy swashbuckler film produced and directed by K. V. Reddy under the Vijaya Productions banner. It stars N. T. Rama Rao, B. Saroja Devi with music composed by Pendyala Nageswara Rao.

The film was subsequently dubbed into Tamil as Jagathalaprathapan, Kannada as Jagadekaveerana Kathe, and also into Bengali, Oriya, and Hindi languages. Released on August 9, 1961, the film was a box office success.

== Plot ==
The king (Mukkamala) and queen (Rushyendramani) of Udayagiri have two sons: Pratap (N. T. Rama Rao), a brave warrior, and Jagajithu (Lanka Satyam), a cowardly and jealous individual. When the king asks his sons about their desires, Pratap expresses his wish to marry four celestial maidens: Indrakumari Jayanti (B. Saroja Devi), Agnikumari Marichi (Bala), Varunakumari Varuni (Jayanthi), and Nagakumari Nagini (L. Vijayalakshmi). Enraged by this audacious request, the king exiles Pratap, who embarks on a quest to fulfill his ambition.

Pratap begins his journey, blessed by his mother, and soon saves a jester named Rendu Chintalu (Relangi) from two vetalas. In gratitude, the vetalas grant them three wishes. Rendu Chintalu reveals his desire to marry his true love and rule a kingdom, while Pratap shares his own goal. They use their first wish to find the celestial maidens bathing, but Rendu Chintalu inadvertently uses the remaining two wishes on trivial matters.

Pratap attempts to woo Jayanti but is turned into a statue by her. The queen prays to Goddess Parvati (Kannamba), who, disguised as an old woman, restores Pratap. She reveals that Jayanti is cursed by Sage Durvasa to marry the man who steals her sari and live on Earth until she retrieves it. With the old woman's guidance, Pratap steals the sari and hides it. Jayanti, now in love due to the curse, marries Pratap after he is restored to his original form.

Pratap, Jayanti, and Rendu Chintalu travel to the kingdom of Kamakuta, ruled by King Threesoka (Rajanala), who desires the perfect wife. His minister, Badarayana (C. S. R.), tries to help him, but when Threesoka sees Jayanti, he becomes infatuated with her. He lures Pratap to the palace under the guise of rewarding him, but his schemes are repeatedly foiled by Ekasha (Girija) and Rendu Chintalu. Threesoka then sends Pratap on dangerous quests to collect poison from Nagaloka and a gem from Varunaloka, both of which he successfully completes, marrying Nagini and Varuni in the process.

Despite Pratap's victories, Threesoka and Badarayana conspire again, this time attempting to send Pratap to Naraka (hell). Pratap returns unharmed, bringing back Marichi as his wife. To escape their own treachery, Threesoka and Badarayana jump into fire, only to meet their demise, while Pratap survives. He reinstates the kingdom's former minister and fulfills Rendu Chintalu's wish by crowning him and Ekasha as king and queen of Kamakuta.

Meanwhile, back in Udayagiri, Jagajithu betrays the kingdom, but the king and queen escape and reunite with Pratap in Kamakuta. The king's eyesight is restored, and Pratap, now with his four wives, is sent to battle. Jagajithu poisons Pratap and abandons him, but Pratap is revived by the celestial maidens. Heartbroken over his circumstances, Pratap continues his journey, ultimately earning the favor of the gods.

Pratap undergoes several tests to prove his worth, including rescuing Agni's wife and displaying divine musical abilities by playing multiple instruments simultaneously. In the final test, he identifies his wives in disguise, affirming his devotion and wisdom. The gods, convinced of his prowess and virtue, grant him their daughters.

Pratap returns to Udayagiri, where he reinstates his parents as rulers and lives happily with his four celestial wives, expressing gratitude to Goddess Parvati.

== Cast ==
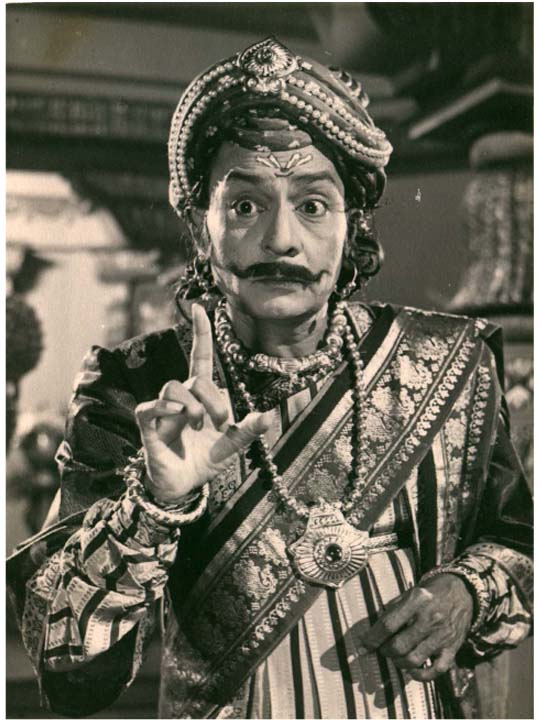
C. S. R. Anjaneyulu as Badarayana Praggada.

- N. T. Rama Rao as Pratap
- B. Saroja Devi as Jayanthi/Indra Kumari
- Rajanala as Threesoka Maharaju
- Relangi as Renduchintalu
- C. S. R. as Badarayana Praggada
- Mikkilineni as Indra
- Mukkamala as Maharaju
- Vangara as Paata Mantri Buddisagar
- Lanka Satyam as Jagajithu
- Kannamba as Goddess Parvathi
- Rushyendramani as Maharani
- L. Vijayalakshmi as Nagini / Naga Kumari
- Girija as Ekaasa
- Jayanthi as Varuni / Varuna Kumari
- Bala as Mareechi / Agni Kumari
- "Gemini" Chandra - Dancer

== Production ==
K. V. Reddy's next project after Pellilnati Pramanalu (1958) was the Vijaya Productions' fantasy film Jagadekaveeruni Katha. The film was adapted from a popular Tamil folktale on which a previous film, Pakshiraja Films' Jagathalapratapan (1944) was also based. Screenwriter Pingali and K. V. Reddy took the core plot from Jagathala Prathapan, but added new characters, made other changes to the story and prepared the script of Jagadekaveeruni Katha which made it quite distinct from the 1944 film.

== Soundtrack ==
Jagadekaveeruni Katha

Film score by Pendyala Nageswara Rao
- Released: 1961
- Genre: Soundtrack
- Length: 39:25
- Producer: Pendyala Nageswara Rao

Music was composed by Pendyala Nageswara Rao. Lyrics were written by Pingali Nagendra Rao. The song "Sivasankari Sivanandalahari" is set in the Carnatic raga known as Darbari Kanada,

S. No	Song title	Singers	length
1	"Jaya Jaya Jaya Jagadeka Pratapa"	P. Susheela	2:28
2	"Jalakalatalalo"	P Suseela, P. Leela, Udutha Sarojini, B. Rajaratnam	2:26
3	"O Sakhi Oho Cheli"	Ghantasala	3:35
4	"Nanu Dayaganava"	P. Leela	2:11
5	"Varinchi Vachina Manava Veerudu"	P Leela, Susheela	3:15
6	"Koppuninda Poovuleme"	Madhavapeddi Satyam, Swarnalata	3:00
7	"Ainadedo Ainadi"	Ghantasala, Suseela	2:48
8	"Aasa Ekasa"	Ghantasala, P. Susheela	2:44
9	"Manoharamuga"	Ghantasala, P. Susheela	3:45
10	"Adilakshmi Vanti Attagarivamma"	P. Leela, Suseela	2:50
11	"Raara Kanaraara"	Ghantasala	3:05
12	"Sivasankari Sivanandalahari"	Ghantasala	6:18

== Box office ==
- The film has celebrated 100 days in 30 centres. The Centenary celebrations were held at Naaz theater in Guntur city. The film unit felicitated an individual who saw the movie 100 times. The film ran well even in each of the subsequent releases.
