= Bhoomi Kosam =

- Anupama Films
- Directed by: K. B. Tilak
- Written by: Sunkara Satyanarayana
- Produced by: K. B. Tilak
- Starring: Ashok Kumar, Gummadi Jaggayya, Prabhakar Reddy, Jamuna
- Cinematography: K.S.Ramakrishna & A.Gopinath
- Edited by: M. Devendranath
- Music by: Pendyala Nageswara Rao
- Release date: 1974
- Running time: 171 minutes
- Country: India
- Language: Telugu

Bhoomi Kosam is a Telugu-language film directed by K. B. Tilak in 1974. It is one of the earliest films to portray far left politics in the Telugu language.

The cast included Ashok Kumar, Gummadi, Jaggayya, Jamuna, Prabhakar Reddy and Chalam, Prabha. It was Jaya Prada's début. She was given this screen name for this film as suggested by M.Prabhakar Reddy.

The film features lyrics by Srirangam Srinivasa Rao (Sri Sri) who was a prominent intellectual and poet of Andhra Pradesh and script by Sunkara Satyanarayana.

== Story ==
The film is about a village's liberation, where the people want to be free from the tyranny of Zamindari. One of Zamindar's sons leads the revolt. The film represents of the efforts of left-wing political parties. The film was dedicated to the memory of Tilak's brother Ramanarasimha Rao who was 'encountered' in 1972.

== Cast ==
- Ashok Kumar as Jagadeeswara Bhoopathi
- Jaggayya as Rajasekharam
- Jamuna as Raji
- Chalam as Suryam
- Prabha as Susheela
- Prabhakar Reddy as Raghavulu
- Thyagaraju as Bhupal Rao
- Ramana Reddy as Subbaiah
