= Chitti Tammudu =

1962 film by K. B. Tilak

- Directed by: K. B. Tilak
- Written by: Kondepudi Laxminarayana (story and dialogues); Arudra (Lyrics)
- Produced by: Jetti Chandrasekhara Reddy; Mungamuri Brothers
- Starring: Jaggayya; Master Venkata Ramana; Kanta Rao; Rajasulochana; Devika
- Cinematography: Laxman Gore
- Edited by: C.H. Venkateswara Rao
- Music by: Pendyala Nageswara Rao
- Distributed by: Poorna Pictures
- Release date: 1962
- Country: India
- Language: Telugu

Chitti Tammudu is a 1962 Telugu drama film directed by K. B. Tilak and produced by Jetti Chandrasekhara Reddy. The film is based on the 1838 English novel Oliver Twist by Charles Dickens.

== The plot ==
The story is about the problems faced by children in orphanages, irregularities by the management and the related consequences.

Ramu (Jaggayya) and Subhadra (Devika) love one other. Ramu urgently leaves to Kashmir, and returns home to find that his beloved Subhadra is pregnant, and that her father had died of that insult. She delivers a boy in a mission hospital and dies. The boy is admitted to an orphanage and named Chiranjeevi. Hostel warden Tayaramma (Suryakantam) feeds the orphans with insufficient food and they are starving.

Ramu has an elder sister Seetha (Sandhya) and younger brother Srihari (Kanta Rao). Seetha is wife of a lawyer (Ramana Reddy). Ramu dies of chronic cough and mental agony, leaving the property in charge of his brother-in-law.

== Cast ==
Jaggayya	Ramu
Kanta Rao	Srihari, younger brother of Ramu
Rajasulochana	
Master Venkata Ramana	Chiranjeevi, son of Ramu
Suryakantham	Tayaramma, Hostel warden
Devika	Subhadra, wife of Ramu
Rajanala Kaleswara Rao	
C. S. R. Anjaneyulu	Ansari
Ramana Reddy	Lawyer
Sandhya	Seeta, wife of Lawyer
Nandamuri Balakrishna	
Ramakrishna	
Rajababu	
K. V. S. Sharma	
Chadalavada Kutumba Rao	

== Soundtrack ==
All lyrics are written by Aarudra; all music is composed by Pendyala Nageswara Rao.

Track listing
No.	Title	Singer (s)	Length
1.	"Adagali Adagali Adigedevaro Telali"	P. Susheela, S. Janaki, Chorus
2.	"Ayyo Rama Ayyo Rama Lamba Rasta"	Madhavapeddi Satyam, Swarnalatha
3.	"Dikkuleni Vaariki Devude Dikku"	P. Susheela
4.	"Maya Bazar Lokam Samiranga"	P. Susheela
5.	"Merupu Merisindoyi Mava"	P. Susheela
6.	"Neevu Nenu Jabili Muvvuramu Unnamuga"	P. Susheela, Ghantasala
7.	"Yesko Naa Raja"	P. Susheela, Maddali
