= Girija (actress) =

Telugu film actress

- Born: Dasari Girija; 3 March 1938; Kankipadu, Madras Presidency, British India
- Died: 5 September 1995 (aged 57); Madras, Tamil Nadu, India
- Occupations: Actress, comedian and film producer
- Years active: 1950 1977
- Spouse: C. S. Raju
- Children: Saleema

Dasari Girija (3 March 1938 – 5 September 1995) was an Indian actress who has worked in Telugu films. She was active in the 1950s, 1960s and 1970s in comic roles. She appeared in many films with Relangi, the two of them becoming a famous comedic duo.

== Film career ==
She was born on 3 March 1938 in Kankipadu, Andhra Pradesh. Her mother was a stage and film actress Dasari Ramatilakam.

Her first movie was Kasturi Sivarao's Paramanandayya Sishyulu (1950). She acted in many films with Relangi and other leading actors of that period. Her portrayal of titular Pathala Bhairavi in 1951 hit film Patala Bhairavi displayed her talents and resulted in her getting many film offers lasting about two decades. Her role as Usha in Appu Chesi Pappu Koodu (1959) opposite Relangi is memorable. The ever lasting comedy song Kaseeki Poyanu Ramahari has been pictured on them. The comedy-duo also acted in the award-winning Ramudu Bheemudu (1964) of Suresh Productions. The funny Sarada Sarada Cigarettu song about the habit of Smoking is superhit during that time. She also acted in Tamil films during the fifties.

She along with Relangi acted in small but key roles in the epic film Lava Kusa (1963) by Shankar Reddy and refused to take any extra remuneration for the extratime in shooting the song Ollanori mama née pillanee.... In addition to the comedy roles, she played as character actress in the key role of Hemalatha opposite Akkineni Nageswara Rao acting as second heroine in Bharya Bhartalu (1961) and as Varalaxmi in Velugu Needalu (1961). She has played key roles in some mythological and Janapada films, like Dharma Devatha (1952).

She started a film company with her husband C. S. Raju as a producer, named Vijaya Giri Dhwaja Productions (named after Girija) and produced few movies including Bhale Mastaru (1969) and Pavitra Hrudayalu (1971), in both films main protagonist is played by N. T. Rama Rao. They met with a heavy financial loss.

== Personal life ==
She married C. Sanyasi Raju, popularly known as C. S. Raju; their daughter Saleema is also an actress who acts mainly in Malayalam movies. According to her daughter Saleema, Girija died on 5 September 1995. Though she has been suffering from Diabetes, in the last moments she experienced some breathing problem and died suddenly in her Chennai residence.

== Filmography ==
Year	Film	Role	Language
1950	Paramanandayya Sishyulu	Hema	Telugu
1951	Navvite Navaratnalu		Telugu
1951	Patala Bhairavi	Pathala Bhairavi	Telugu/Tamil
1952	Dharma Devatha	Vasanthi	Telugu
1952	Velugu Needalu	Varalakshmi	Telugu
1953	Ashadeepam	Sarala	Malayalam
1953	En Veedu		Tamil
1953	Naa Illu		Telugu
1954	Manohara	Princess Vijaya	Tamil/Telugu
1955	Kalyanam Seydhukko		Tamil
1956	Bhale Ramudu	Taara	Telugu
1957	Sankalpam	Suguna	Telugu
1957	Bhale Ammayilu		Telugu
1957	Dongallo Dora		Telugu
1957	M.L. A.		Telugu
1957	Suvarna Sundari	Princess Parthima Devi	Telugu
1957	Veera Kankanam		Telugu
1957	Vaddante Pelli	Lalitha	Telugu
1957	Iru Sagodharigal	Lalitha	Tamil
1958	Appu Chesi Pappu Koodu	Usha	Telugu
1958	Dongalunnaru Jagratha		Telugu
1958	Manchi Manasuku Manchi Rojulu	Rani	Telugu
1958	Anna Thammudu	Padma	Telugu
1959	Illarikam	Kanakadurga	Telugu
1959	Rechukka Pagatichukka		Telugu
1960	Nammina Bantu	Sarala	Telugu
1960	Bhatti Vikramarka	Arakasu, wife of Tirakasu	Telugu
1960	Pelli Kanuka	Kantham	Telugu
1960	Sahasra Siracheda Apoorva Chintamani	Kamalakshi	Telugu
1960	Samajam		Telugu
1960	Runanubandham		Telugu
1961	Bharya Bharthalu	Hema	Telugu
1961	Jagadeka Veeruni Katha	Ekasa	Telugu
1961	Kalasivunte Kaladu Sukham	Haranath's fiancée	Telugu
1961	Vagdanam	Radha	Telugu
1961	Velugu Needalu	Varalakshmi	Telugu/Tamil
1962	Aradhana	Gopi's Fiancée	Telugu
1962	Kula Gothralu	Leela	Telugu
1962	Tiger Ramudu		Telugu
1962	Raktha Sambandham		Telugu
1962	Siri Sampadalu	Rama	Telugu
1962	Aasa Jeevulu		Telugu
1962	Aatma Bandhuvu	Geetha	Telugu
1963	Irugu Porugu		Telugu
1963	Lakshadhikari	Leela	Telugu
1963	Savati Koduku		Telugu
1963	Lava Kusa	Chakali Vaani Bharya	Telugu/Tamil
1963	Paruvu Prathishta		Telugu
1964	Aathma Balam	Chitti	Telugu
1964	Amara Silpi Jakkanna	Fisherwoman Gangu	Telugu
1964	Ramudu Bheemudu	Kamala	Telugu
1964	Vaarasatwam	Seeta	Telugu
1965	Preminchi Choodu		Telugu
1965	Sri Simhachala Kshetra Mahima	Queen of Women Kingdom	Telugu
1965	Prameelarjuneeyam	Maha Maya	Telugu
1965	Satya Harishchandra	Kalahakanthi	Telugu
1965	Mangamma Sapatham		Telugu
1965	Visala Hrudayalu	Shantha	Telugu
1965	Sati Sakkubai	Daughter of Suryakantham	Telugu
1966	Srikakula Andhra Maha Vishnu Katha	Makarika	Telugu
1966	Aastiparulu		Telugu
1966	Srikakula Andhra Maha Vishnu Katha	Makarika	Telugu
1967	Navarathri	Mental patient	Telugu
1967	Rahasyam	Sarvani Devi	Telugu
1967	Vasantha Sena		Telugu
1974	Aadadani Adrustam		Telugu
1974	Devadasu		Telugu/Tamil
1975	Balipeetam	Servant	Telugu
1976	Andharu Bagundali	Govindayya's wife	Telugu
1976	Secretary	Vanita Vihar Member	Telugu
1977	Pantulamma	House Head	Telugu
1977	Savasagallu		Telugu
1979	Maa Voollo Mahasivudu		Telugu
1980	Chandipriya	Singamma	Telugu
1980	Konte Mogudu Penki Pellam	Ranganatham's arrogant wife	Telugu
1981	Prema Natakam	Kumar's mother	Telugu
1981	Kondaveeti Simham		Telugu
1982	Nivuru Gappina Nippu		Telugu
1983	Kanthayya Kanakayya	Gajalakshmi	Telugu
1984	Anubandham		Telugu
