= Jaggayya =

Indian actor, politician (1926–2004)

- Portrait c. 1956
- Born: Kongara Jaggayya; 31 December 1926 (Note: Idlebrain.com cites his date of birth as "09-07-1927".); Tenali, Madras Presidency, British India
- Died: 5 March 2004 (aged 77); Chennai, Tamil Nadu, India
- Other names: Kalavachaspati; Kanchu Kantam
- Education: Andhra Christian College
- Occupations: Actor; littérateur; journalist; lyricist; dubbing artist; politician
- Years active: 1952-1994
- Political party: Indian National Congress
- Awards: Padma Bhushan (1992)

Member of Parliament, Lok Sabha
- In office 16 March 1967 – 27 December 1970
- Preceded by: Madala Narayana Swamy
- Succeeded by: P. Ankineedu Prasada Rao
- Constituency: Ongole

Kongara Jaggayya (31 December 1926 – 5 March 2004) was an Indian actor, littérateur, journalist, lyricist, dubbing artist and politician known for his works predominantly in Telugu cinema and Telugu theatre. He was known as Kanchu Kantam Jaggayya (Telugu) for his booming voice. In a film career spanning forty years as a matinee idol, he starred in eighty films, as a lead actor, and lead antagonist in a variety of genres. In 1967, he was elected as a member of the fourth Lok Sabha, from the constituency of Ongole, becoming the first Indian film actor to be elected as a member of the Parliament.

During his early career he portrayed breakthrough characters in works such as Donga Ramudu (1955), which was archived by the Film and Television Institute of India, He starred in award-winning works such as Bangaru Papa (1954), Ardhangi (1955), Edi Nijam (1956), Todi Kodallu (1957), Dr. Chakravarti (1964), Antastulu (1965), the Cannes Film Festival featured Meghasandesam (1982), and Seethakoka Chiluka (1981); all of which won the National Film Award for Best Feature Films in Telugu. In 1962, he co-produced and starred in the political drama film Padandi Munduku based on Salt March, the film was screened at the International Film Festival of India, the Tashkent Film Festival, and got a special mention at the 5th Moscow International Film Festival.

As a character actor he received critical appreciation for his performance in notable works such as Velugu Needalu (1961), Chitti Tammudu (1962), Aaradhana (1962), Aatma Balam (1964), Sumangali (1965), Gudi Gantalu (1965), Nava ratri (1966), Aame Evaru? (1966), Aastiparulu (1966), Jarigina Katha (1969), Bala Mitrula Katha (1972), Badi Pantulu (1972), Bharya Biddalu (1972), Devudu Chesina Manushulu (1973). He portrayed British official Rutherford in the biographical film Alluri Sita Rama Raju (1974), and essayed Pontius Pilate in the hagiographical film Karunamayudu (1978). He then appeared in works such as Veta (1986), Chantabbai (1986), Pasivadi Pranam (1987), Dharma Kshetram (1992) and Bobbili Simham (1994). He won the Andhra Pradesh state Nandi Award for Best Character Actor for his works in some of these films. A recipient of the Tamil Nadu state's Kalaimamani, the Government of India honored him with the Padma Bhushan in 1992 for his contributions towards Indian cinema.

== Early life ==
Jaggayya was born on 31 December 1926 to Seetaramaiah and Rajya Lakshmamma in Morampudi village near Tenali in Guntur district. He quoted on several occasions in his essays the influence his father had on his interest towards arts. He started acting at the age of 11, with the role of Lava in a Hindi play during his high school days in Duggirala. He was trained in painting under the guidance of Adivi Bapiraju, a noted painter, during his college days.

As a student, he joined the Congress Socialist party in Tenali, which was involved in the Indian Independence Movement at that time.

He joined the Andhra-Christian College, in 1942, in Guntur for his higher studies. He used to be a member of Navya Sahitya Parishath in Guntur. Later he joined a periodical named Desabhimani (meaning "Patriot") as a journalist. Later he worked as an editor for the weekly Andhra Republic. During his B.A. days in A-C College, he along with N. T. Rama Rao, acted in several plays. He also used to be a part of Navajyothi Artists, a cultural organisation run by Mukkamala. After working as a teacher in Duggirala for a brief while, he became a news announcer in Akashavani for three years. Jaggayya won the best actor award in three successive years for Chesina Papam and Telangana.

== Film career ==
Jaggayya made his cinematic debut in 1952 drama film Priyuralu directed by Tripuraneni Gopichand. This movie was produced by Donepudi Krishnamurthy, also known popularly as Gokul Krishnamurthy. He quit the job as news announcer as he signed three movies on a trot. His second movie, Adarsham, didn't do well at box office. His planned third movie Paleru did not even see light of the day.

Bangaru Papa, directed by B N Reddy, released in 1955, was the first breakthrough film for Jaggayya. He was distinguished for his booming voice and contributed as a voice artist for more than hundred feature films. He dubbed in Telugu language for veteran Sivaji Ganesan. He was the narrator, and dubbing artist for internationally recognized works such as Maa Bhoomi, and Richard Attenborough's character of John Hammond in the Telugu-dubbed version of the Hollywood film Jurassic Park. He acted in almost 100 films as a lead, 100 more as a co-lead and almost 200 films as a character artist. He was a part of almost every film of VB Rajendra Parasad's Jagapathi Pictures, K B Tilak's Anupama Pictures and Ramavijeta Films owned by brothers Prabhakar and Baburao. His last film as an actor was Kunthi Putrudu, which starred Mohan Babu as lead and was directed by Dasari Narayana Rao.

He turned into producer with a film Padandi Munduku, under the banner of Jagruthi Chitra. The film was released in January 1962 and was a regarded as first Telugu social film made on the basis of Indian Independence movement.

He was awarded the 'Kala Vachaspathi' for his sonorous voice.

== Political career ==
Jaggayya was active in politics right from his student days and was allied with the socialist group within the Congress party. When the group was disbanded, he joined Jayaprakash Narayan's Praja Socialist Party, but returned to Congress in 1956, heeding the call of Jawaharlal Nehru. In 1967, he was elected as a member of the fourth Lok Sabha, the lower house of the Parliament of India from the constituency of Ongole on a Congress Party ticket. He was the first Indian film actor to be elected as a member of parliament.

== Literary achievements ==
He translated Nobel laureate Rabindranath Tagore's Geetanjali and multiple poems into Telugu under the name Ravindra Geetha. He also translated Tagore's play "Sacrifice" into Telugu under the name Balidaanam. He also co-founded Manasvini Charitable Trust to honor the film literature of Acharya Aatreya. The lyrics of all the film songs written by Athreya was consolidated into seven volumes.

== Death ==
Due to complications after a hip replacement surgery, Jaggayya died on 5 March 2004 at Chennai, Tamilnadu.

== Awards ==
Civilian honours

- Padma Bhushan, Government of India in 1992

Nandi Awards

- Nandi Award for Best Character Actor

State Awards

- Andhra Pradesh Government cash award for producing Padandi Munduku in 1962
- Title of Kalaimamani from Tamil Nadu government

Other honours

- Title of Kala Vachaspathi from the Sanskrit Viswa Vidyalaya, Delhi
- Title of Kala Prapoorna from Andhra University, Visakhapatnam
- Honorary D.Litt. from the Telugu University, Hyderabad

== Filmography ==
List of Jaggayya film credits
Year	Film	Role	Notes
1952	Priyuralu	Shyam	
1954	Bangaru Papa	Manohar	National Film Award for Best Feature Film in Telugu
1955	Ardhangi	Nagendra Rao/Nagu	National Film Award for Best Feature Film in Telugu
1955	Donga Ramudu	Dr. Mohan	Archived at the Film and Television Institute of India
1956	Muddu Bidda	Dr.Madhu	
1956	Edi Nijam	Lawyer	National Film Award for Best Feature Film in Telugu
1957	Veera Kankanam	Chandra Senudu	
1957	Varudu Kavali	Vijay Kumar	
1957	Thodi Kodallu	Vaikuntam	National Film Award for Best Feature Film in Telugu
1957	MLA	Dasu	
1958	Anna Thammudu	Rajendra/Raju	
1958	Atha Okinti Kodale	Raghuram	
1959	Appu Chesi Pappu Koodu	Dr. Raghuram	
1960	Pelli Kanuka	Raghu	
1961	Velugu Needalu	Dr. Raghu	
1962	Chitti Tammudu	Ramu	
1962	Aradhana	Sarathi	
1962	Padandi Munduku	Sathyadev	Producer
1963	Constable Koothuru	Gopi	
1963	Eedu Jodu	Dr.Venu	
1963	Thobuttuvulu	Rajani's husband (Doctor)	
1964	Pooja Phalam	Sriram	
1964	Manchi Manishi	Vasu	
1964	Dr. Chakravarthi	Ravindra	National Film Award for Best Feature Film in Telugu
1964	Aathma Balam	Kumar	
1965	Naadi Aada Janme	Mohan (Special Appearance)	
1965	Sumangali	Shekhar	
1965	Preminchi Choodu	Vasu/SrinivasRao	
1965	Manushulu Mamathalu	Bhaskar	
1965	Gudi Gantalu	Hari	
1965	Antastulu	Nagu	National Film Award for Best Feature Film in Telugu
1966	Navarathri	Doctor (Special Appearance)	
1966	Manase Mandiram	Ramu	
1966	Aame Evaru?	Dr.Anand	
1966	Aastiparulu	Bhachi/Bhaskar	
1967	Prana Mithrulu	Gopalakrishna Prasad	
1968	Bandipotu Dongalu	Bandipotu Naganna	
1968	Veeranjaneya	Indrajit	
1969	Adrushtavanthulu	Boss	
1969	Ardharathiri	Sridhar	
1969	Jarigina Katha	Prasad	
1969	Sipayi Chinnayya	Kodandam	
1971	Ramalayam	Ramaiah	
1971	Vintha Samsaram	'Prestige' Padmanabham	
1971	Chinnanati Snehitulu	Sridhar	
1971	Pattindalla Bangaram	Swamy/Inspector Prathap	
1972	Badi Panthulu	Police Officer Ramu	
1972	Bharya Biddalu	Dr.Manohar	
1973	Devudu Chesina Manushulu	Hari Prasad and Smuggler (Dual role)	
1973	Nindu Kutumbam	Mohan Rao	
1973	Meena	Sarathi	
1974	Bhoomi Kosam	Rajasekharam	
1974	Deeksha	Ramayya	
1974	Alluri Sita Rama Raju	Rutherford Scott Coward	
1974	Mangalya Bhagyam	Chandram	
1974	Manchi Manushulu	Dr. Ramesh	
1976	Padi Pantalu	Civil Engineer Srinivasa Rao	
1976	Raaja	Justice Raghupathi Rao	
1976	Shri Rajeshwari Vilas Coffee Club		
1977	Adavi Ramudu	Forest Officer	
1977	Chanakya Chandragupta	Voice double for Sivaji Ganesan	
1977	Jeevithamlo Vasantham	Raghupathy	
1978	Karunamayudu	Pontius Pilate	
1978	KD No:1		
1978	Dongala Veta		
1978	Sahasavanthudu	Vikram Mahendra Mira	
1979	Vetagadu	Boopathi	
1979	Yugandhar		
1979	Maavari Manchitanam		
1980	Ram Robert Rahim		
1981	Nyayam Kavali	Lawyer Dayanidhi	
1981	Seethakoka Chilaka		National Film Award for Best Feature Film in Telugu
1981	Thiruguleni Manishi		
1982	Bobbili Puli	Gopinath	
1982	Jagannatha Rathachakralu	Ranga Rao	
1982	Edi Dharmam Edi Nyayam?		
1982	Naa Desam		
1982	Yamakinkarudu		
1983	Meghasandesam	Jagannatham	National Film Award for Best Feature Film in Telugu
1983	Poratam		
1984	Disco King		
1984	Jagan	Dharmamurthy	
1984	Sahasame Jeevitham		
1984	Naagu		
1984	Raraju		
1984	Swathi		
1984	Anubandham		
1984	Palnati Puli	Lawyer Mukunda Rao	
1985	Palnati Simham	Sadananda Swamy	
1985	Tirugubatu		
1985	Adavi Donga		
1985	Maa Inti Mahalakshmi	Nagabhushanam	
1985	Maharaju		
1985	Maha Manishi		
1985	Nyayam Meere Chepali		
1985	Agni Parvatam	Jagannadha Rao	
1985	Vijetha		
1985	Pachani Kapuram	Lakshmi Varaprasada Rao	
1986	Brahmastram	Parthasarathi	
1986	Kirathakudu		
1986	Ugra Narasimham	Chakravarthy	
1986	Sri Vemana Charithra		
1986	Veta		
1986	Chantabbai		
1987	Ramu		
1987	President Gari Abbayi	President Chandraiah	
1987	Thene Manasulu	Rao Bahadur Ratnagiri Ranga Rao	
1987	Bhargava Ramudu		
1987	Pasivadi Pranam		
1987	Viswanatha Nayakudu	Voice double for Sivaji Ganesan	
1987	Prema Samrat	Lawyer Raghava Rao	
1988	Manchi Donga		
1988	Aswaddhama	Public Prosecutor Shankaram	
1988	Raktabhishekam		
1988	Yuddha Bhoomi		
1988	Rocky		
1988	Raktha Tilakam		
1988	Aakhari Poratam		
1988	Jhansi Rani	Advocate Jagadish Chandra	
1988	Tiragabadda Telugubidda		
1988	Janaki Ramudu		
1988	Dharma Teja	D.S.P. Chakrapani	
1989	Ajatha Satruvu	Raghavaiah Naidu	
1989	Vintha Dongalu	Duggirala Kesava Rao	
1989	Bala Gopaludu		
1989	State Rowdy	Vice-Chancellor Mukunda Rao	
1990	Alludugaru	Ramachandra Prasad	
1991	Ramudu Kadhu Rakshasudu	Judge Jaganmohana Rao	
1991	Bhargav		
1991	Assembly Rowdy		
1992	Dharma Kshetram		
1992	Rowdy Inspector		
1992	Detective Narada		
1993	Repati Rowdy	Raghuramaiah	
1993	Joker		
1994	Bobbili Simham		
