= K. S. Prakash Rao =

Indian film director, producer, actor and cinematographer

- Born: Kovelamudi Surya Prakash Rao; 27 August 1904; Kolavennu, Madras Presidency, British India (present-day Andhra Pradesh, India)
- Died: 1996 (aged 81–82)
- Occupations: Director, producer, actor, cinematographer
- Spouse: G. Varalakshmi (m. 1943–1996)
- Children: 3, including K. Raghavendra Rao, K Krishna Mohan Rao
- Relatives: Prakash Kovelamudi (grandson); K. Bapayya (nephew)
- Awards: Nandi Awards; Filmfare Awards South

Kovelamudi Surya Prakash Rao (1914–1996) was an Indian film director, producer, actor and cinematographer known for his work in Telugu, Tamil, Kannada, and Hindi films. In 1977 he won the Filmfare Award for Best Director – Kannada for Ganda Hendthi. In 1995, Rao received the Raghupathi Venkaiah Award for his contributions to Telugu cinema. He is the father of noted Telugu director K. Raghavendra Rao and is the uncle of another noted director K. Bapayya.

== Filmography ==
Year	Film	Language	Director	Producer	Notes
1946	Gruhapravesam	Telugu		Yes	
1948	Drohi	Telugu		Yes	
1950	Modati Raatri	Telugu	Yes	Yes	
1951	Deeksha	Telugu	Yes	Yes	
1951	Anni	Tamil	Yes		
1953	Kanna Talli	Telugu	Yes	Yes	
1953	Petrathai	Tamil	Yes		
1954	Balanandam	Telugu	Yes		
1955	Ante Kaavaali	Telugu	Yes	Yes	
1956	Melukolupu	Telugu	Yes		
1956	Marumalarchi	Tamil	Yes		
1960	Renukadevi Mahatyam	Telugu	Yes		
1961	Gullo Pelli	Telugu	Yes		
1962	Mohini Rugmangada	Telugu	Yes	Yes	
1966	Badukuva Daari	Kannada	Yes		
1967	Stree Janma	Telugu	Yes		
1968	Harishchandra	Telugu	Yes		
1968	Bharya	Telugu	Yes		
1968	Bandhipotu Dongalu	Telugu	Yes		
1969	Vichitra Kutumbam	Telugu	Yes		
1971	Tahsildar Gari Ammayi	Telugu	Yes		
1971	Prema Nagar	Telugu	Yes		
1971	Naa Tammudu	Telugu	Yes		
1971	Bhale Papa	Telugu	Yes		
1972	Vasantha Maligai	Tamil	Yes		
1973	Pedda Koduku	Telugu	Yes		
1973	Jeevitam	Telugu	Yes		
1973	Ida Lokam	Telugu	Yes		
1974	Satyaniki Sankellu	Telugu	Yes		
1974	Kode Nagu	Telugu	Yes		
1974	Prem Nagar	Hindi	Yes		
1975	Cheekati Velugulu	Telugu	Yes		
1976	Suprabhatam	Telugu	Yes		
1976	Secretary	Telugu	Yes		
1976	Avan Oru Charitram	Tamil	Yes		
1977	Ganda Hendthi	Kannada	Yes		
1979	Balina Guri	Kannada	Yes		
1982	Kotta Neeru	Telugu	Yes		
1982	Garuda Saukiyama	Tamil	Yes		
1983	Muddula Mogadu	Telugu	Yes		
1991	Rowdy Gaari Pellam	Telugu	Yes		
1992	Donga Police	Telugu	Yes		
1996	Raja Aur Rangeeli	Hindi	Yes		
2022	Pratibimbalu	Telugu	Yes		

=== Actor ===
- Apavadu (1941)
- Patni (1942)
- Drohi (1948)

== Awards ==
- He won Nandi Award for Best Story Writer for 1968 film Bandipotu Dongalu.
