= Jamuna (actress) =

Indian actress (1938–2023)

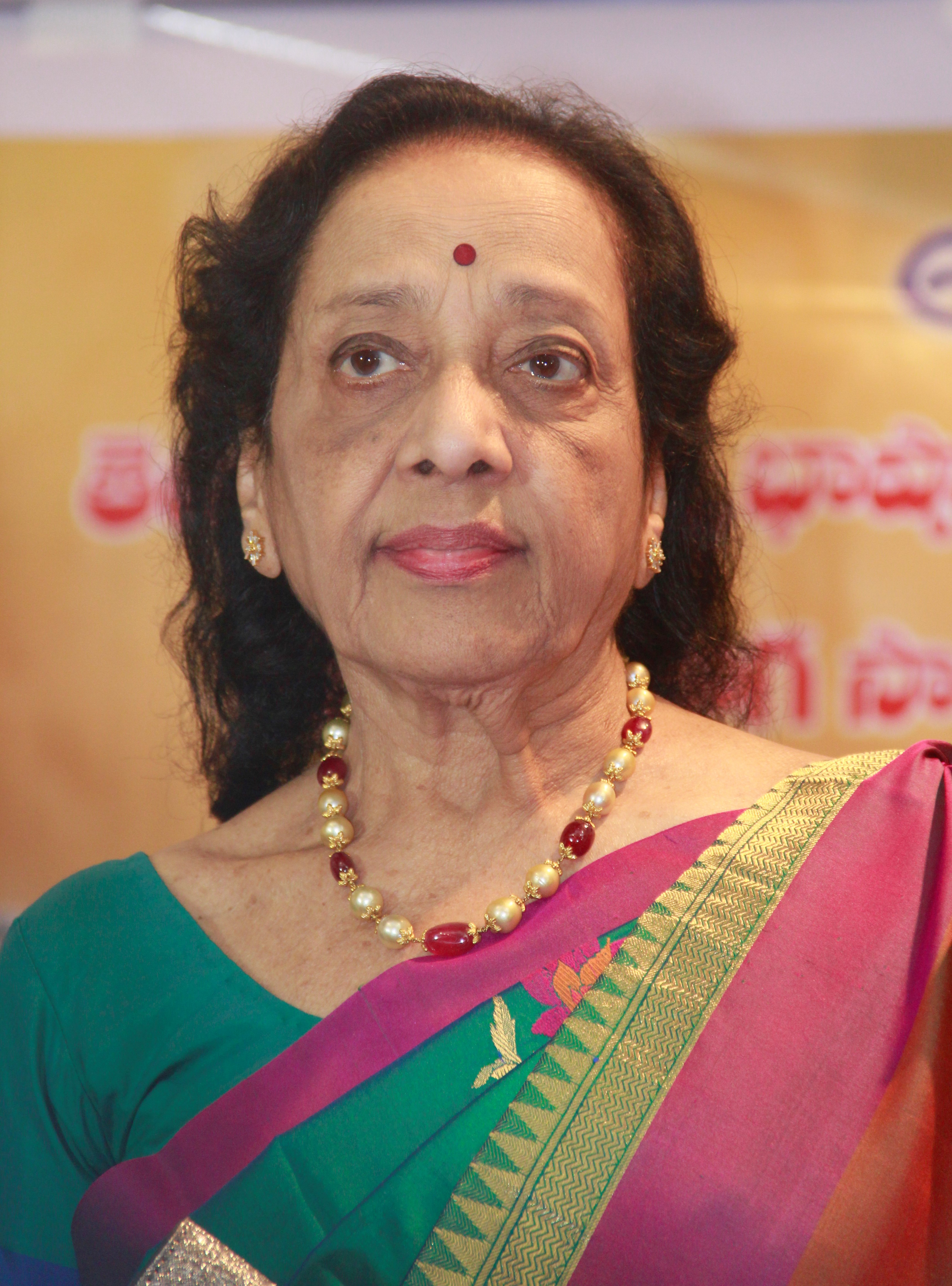
- Jamuna in 2019
- Born: Jamuna Nippani; 30 August 1936; Hampi, Madras Presidency, British India (present-day Karnataka, India)
- Died: 27 January 2023 (aged 86); Hyderabad, Telangana, India
- Other name: N. Jamuna
- Occupations: Actress; politician
- Years active: 1953–1983
- Political party: Indian National Congress
- Spouse: Prof.Juluri Ramana Rao (m. 1965; died 2014)
- Children: Vasmee; Sravanthi

Member of Parliament, Lok Sabha
- In office 1989–1991
- Preceded by: Chundru Sri Hari Rao
- Succeeded by: K. V. R. Chowdary
- Constituency: Rajahmundry

Jamuna (née Nippani; 30 August 1936 – 27 January 2023) was an Indian actress, director, and politician who appeared mainly in Telugu cinema also appeared in Tamil, Kannada, Hindi films. She made her acting debut at age 16 in Dr. Garikapati Rajarao's Puttillu (1953), and received her breakthrough with L. V. Prasad's Missamma (1955). Her filmography also includes Tamil, Kannada, and Hindi films. She won a Filmfare Award and an award at Filmfare Awards South. She was a member of parliament in the 9th Lok Sabha (1989–1991) representing the Rajahmundry constituency.

== Early life ==
Jamuna was born in Hampi in a Kannada Madhva Brahmin family. Her parents were Nippani Srinivasa Rao and Kowsalya Devi. She first was named Jana Bai. Her father was a Madhva Brahmin, while her mother was a Vaisya, resulting in an inter-caste love marriage. Jamuna grew up in Duggirala, in the Guntur district of Andhra Pradesh. Her father was involved in the business of turmeric and tobacco and their family moved there when she was seven years old. When Savitri was performing drama in Duggirala, she would stay at Jamuna's house. Later, Savitri invited Jamuna to act in films. She began performing as heroines in movies at the age of 16.

== Film career ==
Jamuna was a stage artist in school. Her mother taught her vocal music and harmonium. In 1952, Dr. Garikipati Raja Rao of the Indian People's Theatre Association saw her stage show Maa Bhoomi and offered her a role in his film Puttillu.

Jamuna acted in 198 films in Telugu and other south Indian languages. She also acted in Hindi films, winning the Filmfare Best Supporting Actress Award for Milan (1967), repeating her role from the original Telugu film Mooga Manasulu (1964).

Jamuna also established the Telugu artist association and provided social services through it for 25 years.

== Political career ==
Jamuna joined the Congress party in the 1980s and was elected to the Lok Sabha from the Rajahmundry constituency in 1989. She lost the 1991 election and quit politics, but briefly campaigned for the BJP in the late 1990s during Atal Bihari Vajpayee's tenure.

== Personal life and death ==
In 1965 Jamuna married Juluri Ramana Rao, a zoology professor at Osmania University; he died from cardiac arrest on 10 November 2014 at age 86. They had a son, Vamsee Juluri and a daughter, Sravanthi Juluri, and lived in Hyderabad, Telangana, India.

Jamuna died at her home in Hyderabad on 27 January 2023, at age 86.

== Awards ==
- 1968: Filmfare Award for Best Supporting Actress - Milan
- 1972: Filmfare Special Award - South - Pandanti Kapuram
- 1999: Tamil Nadu State Film Honorary Award - MGR Award
- 2008: NTR National Award
- 2010: B. Saroja Devi National Award
- 2019: Santosham Lifetime Achievement Award at 17th Santosham Film Awards

== Filmography ==
=== Telugu ===
1. Puttilu (1953)
2. Maa Gopi (1954)
3. Nirupedalu (1954)
4. Vaddante Dabbu (1954)
5. Iddaru Pellalu (1954)
6. Anta Manavalle (1954)
7. Donga Ramudu (1955)
8. Bangaru Papa (1955)
9. Santosham (1955)
10. Missamma (1955)
11. Vadina Gari Gajulu (1955)
12. Tenali Ramakrishna (1956)
13. Chiranjeevulu (1956)
14. Ilavelpu (1956) as Sarala
15. Muddu Bidda (1956)
16. Nagula Chaviti (1956)
17. Chintamani (1956)
18. Melukolupu (1956)
19. Nagadevatha (1956)
20. Veera Kankanam (1957) as Parvathi
21. Dongallo Dora (1957)
22. Vinayaka Chaviti (1957)
23. Bhagya Rekha (1957)
24. Sati Anasuya (1957)
25. Sri Krishna Maya (1958)
26. Bhookailas (1958) as Mandodari
27. Pellinaati Pramanalu (1958) as Rukmini
28. Appu Chesi Pappu Koodu (1959)
29. Koothuru Kapuram (1959)
30. Maa Inti Mahalakshmi (1959)
31. Illarikam (1959)
32. Jalsa Rayudu (1960)
33. Dharmame Jayam (1960)
34. Bhakta Raghunath (1960)
35. Annapurna (1960) as Annapurna
36. Krishna Prema (1961)
37. Usha Parinayam (1961)
38. Pelli Kani Pillalu (1961)
39. Mohini Rugmangada (1962)
40. Padandi Munduku (1962)
41. Gulebakavali Katha (1962)
42. Gundamma Katha (1962)
43. Appagintalu (1962)
44. Pelli Thamboolam (1962)
45. Eedu Jodu (1963) as Santha
46. Thobuttuvulu (1963) as Rajani
47. Pooja Phalam (1964)
48. Bobbili Yuddham (1964)
49. Manchi Manishi (1964)
50. Mooga Manasulu (1964)
51. Muralikrishna (1964)
52. Ramudu Bheemudu (1964)
53. Dorikithe Dongalu (1965)
54. Mangamma Sapatham (1965) as Mangamma
55. Keelu Bommalu (1965)
56. Thodu Needa (1965)
57. C. I. D. (1965)
58. Naadi Aada Janme (1965) as Malathi
59. Sri Krishna Tulabharam (1965) as Satyabhama
60. Leta Manasulu (1966)
61. Srikakula Andhra Maha Vishnu Katha (1966) as Sujatha
62. Navarathri (1966)
63. Adugu Jaadalu (1966) as Parvathi
64. Sangeeta Lakshmi (1966)
65. Palnati Yuddham (1966) as Maguva Manchala
66. Chadarangam (1967)
67. Upayamlo Apayam (1967)
68. Poola Rangadu (1967)
69. Pelliroju (1968)
70. Chinnari Paapalu (1968)
71. Bandipotu Dongalu (1968)
72. Ramu (1968)
73. Undamma Bottu Pedata (1968)
74. Amayakudu (1968)
75. Challani Needa (1968)
76. Palamanasulu (1968)
77. Sati Arundathi (1968)
78. Bangaru Sankellu(1968)
79. Atta O Kodalu (1969)
80. Muhurtha Balam (1969) as Radha
81. Mooga Nomu (1969) as Gauri
82. Ekaveera (1969)
83. Adajanma (1970)
84. Allude Menalludu (1970)
85. Maro Prapancham (1970)
86. Bangaru Thalli (1971)
87. Ramalayam (1971)
88. Sri Krishna Vijayamu (1971)
89. Mattilo Manikyam (1971) as Lakshmi
90. Sati Anasuya (1971)
91. Tahsildar Gari Ammayi (1971) as Madhumathi
92. Srimanthudu (1971) as Radha
93. Manasu Mangalyam (1971) as Manjula
94. Pavitra Hrudayalu (1971)
95. Attanu Diddina Kodalu (1972)
96. Sampoorna Ramayanam (1972) as Kaikeyi
97. Pandanti Kapuram (1972)
98. Collector Janaki (1972)
99. Menakodalu (1972)
100. Dabbuki Lokam Dasoham (1973) as Aruna
101. Dhanama? Daivama? (1973) as Janaki
102. Bangaru Manasulu (1973)
103. Snehabandham (1973)
104. Nindu Kutumbam (1973) as Mohini
105. Mamatha (1973)
106. Pasi Hrudayalu (1973)
107. Bhoomi Kosam (1974) as Raji
108. Gowri (1974)
109. Deerghasumangali (1974)
110. Peddalu Marali (1974)
111. Adambaralu Anubandhalu (1974)
112. Manushulu Mattibommalu (1974)
113. Yasodha Krishna (1975)
114. Cinema Vaibhavam (1975)
115. Bharathi (1975)
116. Samsaram (1975)
117. Moguda Pellama (1975)
118. Parivartana (1975)
119. Ee Kalam Dampatulu (1975)
120. Manushulanta Okkate (1976)
121. Vanaja Girija (1976)
122. Seetha Kalyanam (1976)
123. Kuruskhetram (1977) as Draupadi
124. Chiranjeevi Rambabu (1977) as Rathnam
125. Gadusu Pillodu (1977) as Parvathi
126. Seetha Rama Vanavasam (1977)
127. Rajaputra Rahasyam (1978) as Tripurasundari Devi
128. Sri Rama Pattabhishekam (1978)
129. Akbar Salim Anarkali (1978) as Jodha
130. Rama Banam (1979)
131. Mama Allulla Saval (1980)
132. Kaksha (1980)
133. Naa Desam(1982)
134. Bangaru Koduku (1982)
135. Mandaladeesudu (1987)
136. Tarzan Sundari (1988)
137. Annapurnamma gari manavadu (2021)

=== Tamil ===
1. Panam Paduthum Padu (1954)
2. Jaya Gopi (1955)
3. Missiamma (1955)
4. Thiruttu Raman (1955)
5. Tenali Raman (1956)
6. Naga Devathai (1956)
7. Kudumba Villakku (1956)
8. Thangamalai Ragasiyam (1957)
9. Pakka Thirudan (1957)
10. Kula Gouravam (1957)
11. Bhaktha Ravana (1958)
12. Kadan Vaangi Kalyaanam (1958)
13. Bommai Kalyanam (1958)
14. Vaazhkai Oppandham (1959)
15. Kanniraindha Kanavan (1959)
16. Thaai Magalukku Kattiya Thaali (1959) as Sundari
17. Nalla Theerpu (1959)
18. Kadavulin Kuzhandhai (1960)
19. Marutha Nattu Veeran (1961)
20. Revathi (1961)
21. Nichaya Thaamboolam (1962) as Seetha
22. Dakshayagnam (1962)
23. Manithan Maravillai (1962)
24. Kuzhandaiyum Deivamum (1965)
25. Anbu Sagodharargal (1973)
26. Naan Nandri Solven (1979)
27. Thoongadhey Thambi Thoongadhey (1983)

=== Kannada ===
1. Aadarsha Sathi (1955)
2. Tenali Ramakrishna (1956)
3. Bhookailasa (1956)
4. Rathnagiri Rahasya (1957)
5. Sakshatkara (1971)
6. Mayeya Musuku (1980)
7. Guru Sarwabhowma Sri Raghavendra Karune (1980)
8. Police Matthu Dada (1991)

=== Hindi ===
1. Miss Mary (1957)
2. Ramu Dada (1961)
3. Ek Raaz (1963)
4. Hamrahi (1963)
5. Beti Bete (1964)
6. Rishte Naate (1965)
7. Milan (1967) (Filmfare Best Supporting Actress award)
8. Dulhan (1975)
9. Naukar Biwi Ka (1983)
10. Raaj Tilak (1984)
11. Yaadgaar (1984)
