= K. B. Tilak =

Indian film producer (1926-2010)

- Born: Korlipara Balagangadhara Tilak; 4 January 1926; Denduluru, West Godavari, Andhra Pradesh, India
- Died: 23 September 2010 (aged 84); Hyderabad, India
- Occupations: Director, producer
- Years active: 1950–1983

Korlipara Balagangadhara Tilak (14 January 1926 – 23 September 2010), popularly known as K. B. Tilak, was an Indian independence activist, film director and producer.

== Early life ==
He was born at Denduluru in West Godavari district in the Madras Presidency of British India (now the state of Andhra Pradesh) on 14 January 1926. His parents are Korlipara Venkatadri and Subbamma. His paternal grandfather was Gangadharayya. His birth name was Balagangadhara Rao. His father was an Indian Independence activist. He liked Bal Gangadhar Tilak and extended his name to Balagangadhara Tilak subsequently. His maternal grandfather is Akkineni Sriramulu, father of veteran film personality L. V. Prasad and Akkineni Sanjeevi.

After primary education, he attended Municipal High School in Eluru. He was influenced by the Indian independence movement, which shook the country, and he joined their activities regularly. He participated in the Quit India movement and was jailed in September 1942. He was shifted to Rajahmundry Central Jail and came in contact with Mote Narayana Rao and Karmanchi Rammoorty. He was released after 6 months of imprisonment. He worked as a Newspaper boy in the Congress Radio movement of Usha Mehta. He actively participated in the Praja Natya Mandali, run by Mudigonda Jagganna Sastry.

He shifted to Bombay and joined his uncle L. V. Prasad. He developed contacts with the film personalities who used to visit the house. He looked after the egg business of Prasad. He used to participate in the Communist Party activities. He worked as a sales boy for a cosmetics distribution company run by Kanuri Ramananda Chowdary. He marketed the famous hand-made laces from Narsapur to Bombay.

His last movie direction was Dharma Vaddi in 1982. He died on 23 September 2010 at Krishna Institute of Medical Sciences, Hyderabad.

== Filmography ==
| Year | Film | Language | Credits |
|---|---|---|---|
| 1956 | Muddu Bidda | Telugu | director and producer |
| 1957 | M.L.A. | Telugu | director and producer |
| 1958 | Atha Okinti Kodale | Telugu | director and producer |
| 1961 | Mamiyarum Oru Veetu Marumagale | Tamil | director and producer |
| 1962 | Chitti Tammudu | Telugu | director |
| 1963 | Eedu Jodu | Telugu | director and producer |
| 1965 | Uyyala Jampala | Telugu | director and producer |
| 1968 | Pantalu Pattimpulu | Telugu | director |
| 1971 | Chhoti Bahu | Hindi | director |
| 1971 | Kangan | Hindi | director |
| 1974 | Bhoomi Kosam | Telugu | director |
| 1976 | Kolleti Kapuram | Telugu | director |
| 1982 | Dharma Vaddi | Telugu | director |

== Awards ==
- He won the B. N. Reddy National Award in 2008.
