= Paava Mannippu =

1961 film by A. Bhimsingh

- Theatrical release poster
- Directed by: A. Bhimsingh
- Screenplay by: A. Bhimsingh
- Story by: J. P. Chandrababu (uncredited)
- Produced by: A. Bhimsingh; A. V. Meiyappan
- Starring: Sivaji Ganesan; Gemini Ganesan; Savitri; Devika; M. R. Radha
- Cinematography: G. Vittal Rao
- Edited by: A. Bhimsingh
- Music by: Viswanathan–Ramamoorthy
- Production companies: AVM Productions; Buddha Pictures
- Distributed by: AVM Productions
- Release date: 16 March 1961
- Running time: 196 minutes
- Country: India
- Language: Tamil
- Budget: ₹ 1.05 million

Paava Mannippu (transl. Forgiveness of sins) is a 1961 Indian Tamil-language drama film directed and edited by A. Bhimsingh, who co-produced it under his banner Buddha Pictures, with AVM Productions. The film features an ensemble cast of Sivaji Ganesan, Gemini Ganesan, Savitri, Devika and M. R. Radha. M. V. Rajamma, V. Nagayya, S. V. Subbaiah and T. S. Balaiah play supporting roles. It revolves around four children who are separated from their parents in childhood, then found and raised by foster parents of different religious backgrounds.

Bhimsingh initially began work on a film titled Abdullah, starring J. P. Chandrababu who narrated the story to him. Though some scenes were filmed, Bhimsingh was unconvinced with the results; after AVM volunteered to co-produce the film, Bhimsingh redeveloped the script as Paava Mannippu, with Chandrababu replaced by Sivaji Ganesan. The soundtrack and score were composed by Viswanathan–Ramamoorthy while Kannadasan was the lyricist.

Paava Mannippu was released on 16 March 1961. The film became a commercial success and a silver jubilee film. It received the National Film Award for Second Best Feature Film, becoming the first South Indian film to do so. The film achieved cult status in Tamil cinema and was remade in Telugu as Oke Kutumbham (1970) by Bhimsingh.

== Plot ==
Aalavandhar is a jeweller who lives with his wife Maragatham and two sons Ramu and Rajan. Out of greed, Aalavandhar kills a fellow jeweller who comes to sell him diamonds. When the police interrogate him, he smartly puts the blame on one of his workers named Manickam Pillai. Manickam lives with his wife and daughter Thangam. His wife, on learning that he is implicated in the murder, dies of shock immediately after delivering a baby girl. A sympathetic neighbour leaves the baby in Maragatham's custody and takes the elder daughter with her. Maragatham hands over the child to their family friend, James.

On learning of his wife's death, and before being arrested by the police, Manickam kidnaps Ramu in revenge and leaves him on a railway track to be killed. Before Manickam changes his mind and decides to rescue him, a local Muslim doctor saves the child and takes him away. All four children grow up: Aalavandhar's son Rajan, Ramu as Raheem in the doctor's house, Manickam's first daughter as Thangam in the neighbour's house, and his second daughter as Mary in James' house. Rajan falls in love with Thangam while Raheem likes Mary. The two women reciprocate their feelings.

Aalavandhar continues to indulge in illegal activities. Raheem, who has taken up his foster father's profession, protects the people living in a nearby slum area and fights for their rights. Though the slum does not belong to Aalavandhar, he claims it is his property, and plans to sell it for his own personal gain. Raheem and Aalavandhar often argue over this issue. Aalavandhar is also keen to get Mary married to Rajan so that he can inherit James' property. On learning of Raheem's love for Mary, Aalavandhar pours acid on his face while he is asleep to get rid of him. Though Raheem survives, his face is disfigured. Nevertheless, Mary continues to love him. On hearing of this, Aalavandhar implicates Raheem in a false charge of theft and an attempt to murder him; Raheem is arrested. While he is in jail, Aalavandhar has the slum vacated.

In the meantime, Manickam—who has served time in prison for the murder Aalavandhar committed—is released from jail for good behaviour and joins James as a driver to be with Mary. Rajan becomes a police officer and soon learns of his father's illegal activities. After having a frustrating argument with Aalavandhar, Rajan resigns his job as he does not wish to take action against his father. Raheem is soon released on bail and plans to get Rajan and Thangam married. Aalavandhar learns of this and, in a fit of rage, locks Raheem in a hut and sets it on fire. When Manickam learns of the conflict between Aalavandhar and Raheem, he reveals to Maragatham that Raheem is her son Ramu, whom he kidnapped. All of them rush to save Raheem. When Aalavandhar learns the truth about Raheem, he immediately realises his mistakes and saves him. Aalavandhar then confesses his wrongdoings to the police and is arrested. All the family members unite and propagate religious harmony.

== Cast ==
Actors

- Sivaji Ganesan as Ramu / Raheem
- Gemini Ganesan as Rajan
- M. R. Radha as Aalavandhar
- V. Nagayya as the Muslim doctor
- T. S. Balaiah as Manickam Pillai
- S. V. Subbaiah as James
- Kothamangalam Subbu as the ayurvedic doctor
- S. Rama Rao as Aalavandhar's sidekick

Actresses

- Savitri as Thangam
- Devika as Mary
- M. V. Rajamma as Maragatham

== Production ==
=== Development ===
The idea for Paava Mannippu came to A. Bhimsingh based on a story narrated to him by J. P. Chandrababu involving a man who was born a Hindu, raised as a Muslim, and marries a Christian woman. Bhimsingh was impressed with Chandrababu's story and decided to direct a film based on it, in addition to producing it under his banner Buddha Pictures. The project was titled Abdullah.

Bhimsingh initially filmed 2,000 feet (610 m) of test footage with scenes featuring Chandrababu as the protagonist. Not convinced with the results, Bhimsingh sought M. Saravanan's opinion by screening the film footage for him. Saravanan liked the story and related it to his father A. V. Meiyappan, who volunteered to co-produce the film with Bhimsingh under AVM Productions; Bhimsingh agreed and began to redevelop the script with the title Paava Mannippu. Chandrababu was not credited for the original story. M. S. Solaimalai wrote the dialogues.

=== Casting and filming ===
While attending the marriage ceremony of Sivaji Ganesan's brother V. C. Shanmugam, Bhimsingh approached Ganesan himself about taking on the lead role of Ramu / Raheem as he felt that the film would not work with Chandrababu as the protagonist. Chandrababu concurred and agreed with Bhimsingh's choice of Ganesan for the lead role. Ganesan agreed to take the role after being impressed with the script.

Devika was chosen to play Raheem's love interest Mary, for which she accepted a salary of ₹4,500. The role of the diamond merchant Aalavandhar's (M. R. Radha) wife Maragatham was initially offered to P. Kannamba, but because of her poor health at the time, Bhimsingh cast M. V. Rajamma instead. Kothamangalam Subbu was cast as an ayurvedic doctor, and Paava Mannippu was his final film as an actor.

Principal photography began with a puja ceremony held at AVM Studios on 20 January 1960. The initial budget for the film was ₹4.5 lakh. After the inclusion of Ganesan in the cast instead of Chandrababu, as well as making appropriate changes to the original script, the budget spiralled to ₹10.5 lakh (worth ₹44 crore in 2021 prices). (Note: The exchange rate in 1961 was 4.79 Indian rupees (₹) per 1 US dollar (US$).) The scene where Gemini Ganesan's character plays mixed doubles was shot at Loyola College's courts. The final length of the film was 17,676 feet (5,388 m).

== Themes ==
In the film [Paava Mannipu], we spoke against the feudal caste system and the righteousness of religious unity in our country. Through my character, they communicated the importance of brotherhood among Indians of various religions be they Christian, Hindu or Muslim.

— Sivaji Ganesan on the concept of the film

Paava Mannippu revolves around the subject of religious tolerance and communal harmony. Film historians Ashish Rajadhyaksha and Paul Willemen believe that through the songs, the film attempts "to advocate a nationalist secularism." Tamil film historian and writer S. Theodore Baskaran notes that the liberal depiction of Muslims and Hindus living together in the slum area shows the "harmonious intermingling of the two communities." The central characters deliver what Baskaran describes as "pedagogic lines on the unity of all religions and on the equality of all human beings." The inclusion of religious symbols such as the crucifix and the figurine of the Buddha further stresses the importance of communal harmony.

All three writers opine that three of the main characters – a Hindu diamond merchant (M. R. Radha), a Muslim village doctor (Sivaji Ganesan), and a Christian do-gooder (Devika) – symbolise the three major religions of Tamil Nadu. They further elaborate that since Kannadasan, the film's lyricist, was affiliated with the erstwhile Dravida Munnetra Kazhagam, he exhibited the political party's rationalist notions through his songs. While Baskaran says Kannadasan wrote "quite a few lines lampooning religion", Rajadhyaksha and Willemen state he "included ironic lines which redeem the didacticism of the script."

According to French film historian Yves Thoraval, Paava Mannippu questions religion; in the song "Vantha Naal Muthal" the hero wonders why religions were created. In his book Popular Cinema and Politics in South India: The Films of MGR and Rajinikanth, S. Rajanayagam compared Paava Mannippu to two other Sivaji Ganesan-Bhimsingh films: Pasamalar (1961) and Parthal Pasi Theerum (1962) as the three films "sentimentalised the family-based fraternal, filial and paternal love." Writing for Hindu Tamil Thisai, S. S. Vasan made a thematic comparison of "Vantha Naal Muthal" to Hemant Kumar's song "Din Raat Badalte Hain" from Naya Sansaar (1959). Rajanayagam mentions how the personality of humans keeps changing despite natural elements around them remaining intact, while Vasan notes that everything is prone to change, including humans and natural elements, and nothing ever remains intact.

== Music ==
The soundtrack and score were composed by the duo Viswanathan–Ramamoorthy (M. S. Viswanathan and T. K. Ramamoorthy) while the lyrics for the songs were written by Kannadasan. The songs were recorded on 45 RPM records made by The Gramophone Company of India Ltd, under whose label the soundtrack was also released. The violin parts for the song "Vantha Naal Muthal", which is based on the Mohanam raga, were played by Ramamoorthy himself. Mukul Bose, brother of film director Nitin Bose, was the film's sound designer. For the recording of "Vantha Naal Muthal", Bose had to make use of an area that was allocated for filming as the recording theatre could not accommodate all the musicians. The song was recorded using electrical cable wires that ran to the film studio from the recording theatre. Kannadasan acknowledged Jeyaraj, an artist in Chennai, as the inspiration behind the lyrics "Kalaigalile aval ovyiam" in the song "Kaalangalil Aval Vasantham".

The soundtrack received critical acclaim, with "Aththan Ennaththan", "Kaalangalil Aval Vasantham", "Paal Irukkum Pazham Irukkum" and "Vantha Naal Muthal" becoming hits. The soundtrack was particularly popular in Sri Lanka, where the songs were frequently broadcast on Radio Ceylon. Film historian Randor Guy believed that Kannadasan's lyrics and Viswanathan–Ramamoorthy's music contributed significantly to the film's success. Film critic Baradwaj Rangan found "Kaalangalil Aval Vasantham" to be a "joyous list song." (Note: According to Rangan, a list song is a song "whose structure is that of a list, a catalogue of similar-sounding (or similar-meaning) things.") Singer Charulatha Mani named "Vantha Naal Muthal" her "personal favourite" in Mohanam and that T. M. Soundararajan's voice "expresses the gamakas with precision." According to film music historian Vamanan, Paava Mannippu "set the stage for a new musical phase that crowned Susheela as the queen of Tamil film songs." He also labelled "Aththan Ennaththan" as an "entrancing melody".

"Kaalangalil Aval Vasantham" provided a much-needed breakthrough for P. B. Sreenivas as a playback singer. Bhimsingh and Viswanathan–Ramamoorthy convinced Meiyappan to let Sreenivas render the song instead of Gemini Ganesan's usual playback singer A. M. Rajah. The news organisation Firstpost included "Aththan Ennaththan" as one of "five great Tamil songs from 'Mellisai Mannar' MSV". A remix version of "Vantha Naal Muthal" is featured on music artist M. Rafi's album Aasaiyae Alaipolae. The song "Ellorum Kondaduvom", sung by Soundararajan and Nagore E. M. Hanifa, is aired on DD Chennai every Eid al-Fitr to commemorate the Islamic festival. It also established Hanifa as a singer of devotional Muslim songs.

Track listing
No.	Title	Singer(s)	Length
1.	"Aththan Ennaththan"	P. Susheela	04:38
2.	"Ellorum Kondaduvom"	T. M. Soundararajan, Nagore E. M. Hanifa	04:44
3.	"Kaalangalil Aval Vasantham"	P. B. Sreenivas	03:10
4.	"Paal Irukkum Pazham Irukkum"	P. Susheela	03:27
5.	"Saaya Veeti"	T. M. Soundararajan, K. Jamuna Rani, L. R. Eswari	03:57
6.	"Silar Siripar Silar Azhuvar"	T. M. Soundararajan	05:24
7.	"Vantha Naal Muthal"	T. M. Soundararajan	04:57
8.	"Vantha Naal Muthal" (Pathos)	T. M. Soundararajan, G. K. Venkatesh	04:54
Total length:			35:11

== Marketing ==
To promote the film, a giant-sized Hydrogen-filled balloon, imported from Japan, was hoisted above the Shanthi theatre. On the balloon's head was written "AVM" in English signifying the production company's involvement. The tail end of the balloon had the name of the film written in Tamil ("பாவ மன்னிப்பு"). This was considered the first time a balloon was used to promote a Tamil film. It was a source of attraction for all who passed by the Shanthi theatre. However, AVM Productions faced legal issues regarding the use of the balloon. It received separate notices – one directly from the Chennai International Airport authorities and the other from its explosives division – to procure permission to use hydrogen cylinders to fly the balloon. Meiyappan managed to resolve the issue by obtaining permission from the authorities.

AVM decided to use the popularity of the soundtrack album as another means to publicise the film. The production company conducted a contest using the film's songs on radio stations. To enter the contest, listeners wrote down the songs from the soundtrack starting with the one they liked most. The winner was determined based on whether their list tallied with that prepared by AVM, who announced their list after receiving the contest participants' entries. The winner would receive a cash prize of ₹ 10,000. The contest was considered a first of its kind promoting Tamil cinema and received a positive response. A total of 400,000 people participated in the contest and the winner was a girl named Bhanumati.

== Release ==
After originally being scheduled for a February 1961 release, Paava Mannippu was released on 16 March 1961. The film's premiere was initially scheduled to be held at Chitra theatre in Pudhupet as most films starring Sivaji Ganesan were released there, but Meiyappan wanted the film to be released at the newer and much bigger Shanti Theatre in Anna Salai. The Tamil film industry had a superstitious belief that Shanthi theatre was jinxed as the films that had their premiere there failed commercially. Meiyappan wanted to prove that the theatre was not jinxed by premiering Paava Mannippu there. The film was successful and helped to break the streak of flops for the theatre. As a result, Paava Mannippu became the first of Ganesan's films, to be released at the Shanthi theatre. The film achieved a theatrical run of 175 days, becoming a silver jubilee film. (Note: A silver jubilee film is one that completes a theatrical run of 175 days.) According to Baskaran, "The galaxy of stars, the eight songs, a riotous performance by M. R. Radha and the theme of communal harmony made Pavamannippu [sic] a successful and memorable film of the sixties." The film received a National Film Award for Second Best Feature Film, the first South Indian film to do so. Despite being dubbed into Telugu as Paapa Pariharam, released in the same year, it was remade by Bhimsingh in the same language as Oke Kutumbham (1970).

== Reception ==
Paava Mannippu was praised for Bhimsingh's screenplay and direction, and the performances of the lead cast, especially that of M. R. Radha. On 24 March 1961, the reviewer from The Indian Express called it a "beautifully mounted film" while highly appreciating the way Bhimsingh handled the film's theme of religious toleration. Kanthan of Kalki wrote that though there was nothing special about the story, the performances of the cast made the film worth watching. Paava Mannippu was the first Tamil film that singers/sisters Lata Mangeshkar and Asha Bhosle saw. The two watched it at the Aurora theatre in Mumbai. The sisters were so impressed by Ganesan's performance as Raheem that they found themselves crying during the intermission stage even though neither of them understood Tamil. After the show, they called on Ganesan and each tied a Rakhi around his right wrist, thereby embracing him as their brother. The sisters then asked Ganesan and Meiyappan for a 16 mm print of Paava Mannippu for themselves to keep as a memento; Ganesan and Meiyappan agreed.

== Legacy ==
Paava Mannippu was one of Bhimsingh's many successful films in the Pa series and achieved cult status in Tamil cinema. (Note: The other films in the Pa series are Pathi Bakthi (1958), Bhaaga Pirivinai (1959), Padikkadha Medhai (1960), Pasamalar and Palum Pazhamum (both 1961), Bandha Pasam, Parthal Pasi Theerum and Padithal Mattum Podhuma (all three in 1962), Paar Magaley Paar (1963), Pachai Vilakku (1964), Paaladai (1967), and Paadhukaappu (1970).) Sivaji Ganesan mentioned in his autobiography that Bhimsingh hardly imagined that he would make a series of films that began with the letter Pa, implying that he "might have thought about it at first because his name starts with the same letter in Tamil. Later he might have decided to stay on with this letter for sentimental reasons." Rajadhyaksha and Willemen claimed that with this film, Bhimsingh established himself "as the main purveyor of moralising all-star movies in the 60s." Historian Kumuthan Maderya noted that Shankar Salim Simon (1978) adopted elements from Paava Mannippu, namely "lost-and-found family members, inter-religious romance, and communal harmony".

== In popular culture ==
Paava Mannippu was referenced and parodied in various other films. In Moodu Pani (1980), Chandru (Pratap Pothen) and Rekha (Shoba) attend a screening of the film. When Goundamani and Senthil try to teach music to a Muslim butcher in Themmangu Paattukaaran (1997), the butcher sings the song "Paal Irukkum Pazham Irukkum" in a discordant manner, much to the duo's chagrin. In both Kakkai Siraginilae (2000), and Arul (2004), Vadivelu sings the song "Vantha Naal Muthal" while riding a bicycle. Vadivelu and Nassar sing the beginning portion of "Paal Irukkum Pazhamirukkum" in Koodi Vazhnthal Kodi Nanmai (2000). In Panchatanthiram (2002) Ramachandramurthy (Kamal Haasan) mentions the words "Silar Siripar Silar Azhuvar" when his friend's father-in-law, Parthasarathy (Nagesh) enquires about Ramachandramurthy's wife, Mythili (Simran). In King (2002), Vadivelu, who plays an aspiring film director, makes fun of Raja (Vikram) by saying "Pasi Irukkum. Pazham Irukkum. Paal Irukkadho?" (There will be hunger. There will be a fruit. Won't there be milk?) when the latter does not have milk to drink. Raja then takes an empty cup and miraculously drinks Vadivelu's cup of milk from his own empty cup. In retaliation for Vadivelu's couplet, he says "Paal Irukkum. Pazham Irukkum. Kudikka Mudiyadhu." (There will be milk. There will be a fruit. They can't be drunk). "Vantha Naal Muthal" is also played right before Kaali's (Rajinikanth) introduction scene in Petta (2019).

== Bibliography ==
- Baskaran, S. Theodore (1996). The Eye of the Serpent: An Introduction to Tamil Cinema. East West Books. OCLC 243920437.
- Baskaran, S. Theodore (2008). Sivaji Ganesan: Profile of an Icon. Wisdom Tree. ISBN 978-81-8328-396-0.
- Dhananjayan, G. (2011). The Best of Tamil Cinema, 1931 to 2010: 1931–1976. Galatta Media. OCLC 733724281.
- Ganesan, Sivaji; Narayana Swamy, T. S. (2007) [2002]. Autobiography of an Actor: Sivaji Ganesan, October 1928 – July 2001. Sivaji Prabhu Charities Trust. OCLC 297212002.
- Guy, Randor (2016). Memories of Madras: Its Movies, Musicians & Men of Letters. Creative Workshop. ISBN 978-81-928961-7-5.
- Rajadhyaksha, Ashish; Willemen, Paul (1998) [1994]. Encyclopaedia of Indian Cinema. British Film Institute and Oxford University Press. ISBN 0-19-563579-5.
- Rajanayagam, S. (2015). Popular Cinema and Politics in South India: The Films of MGR and Rajinikanth. Routledge. ISBN 978-1-138-82203-0.
- Saravanan, M. (2013) [2005]. AVM 60 Cinema (in Tamil) (3rd ed.). Rajarajan Pathippagam. OCLC 1158347612.
- Thoraval, Yves (2000). The Cinemas of India. Macmillan India. ISBN 978-0-333-93410-4.
