= Khaidi Kannayya =

1962 film directed by B. Vittalacharya

- Poster
- Directed by: B. Vittalacharya
- Based on: Qaidi No. 911 by C. J. Pavri
- Produced by: Pothina Doondeswara Rao
- Starring: Kantha Rao; Rajanala; Gummadi; Relangi; Rajasulochana; Girija
- Cinematography: Chandru
- Edited by: Govindaswamy
- Music by: Rajan–Nagendra
- Production company: Rajalakshmi Productions
- Release date: 1 March 1962
- Country: India
- Language: Telugu

Khaidi Kannayya (transl. Convict Kannayya) is a 1962 Indian Telugu-language crime film directed by B. Vittalacharya and produced by Pothina Doondeswara Rao. It is a remake of the Hindi film Qaidi No. 911 (1959). The film stars Kantha Rao, Rajanala, Gummadi, Relangi, Rajasulochana and Girija. It was released on 1 March 1962, and became a success.

== Plot ==
Kannayya is robbed of the cash he was carrying by a gangster named Paparao. Paparao, with the assistance of his partner Ramu, also kidnaps Kannayya's motherless son, Ravi. Framed for the theft, Kannayya is arrested and imprisoned. While in prison, Kannayya learns of his son's death and mistakenly blames his sister-in-law, Madhavi, and her brother, Ramu, for the tragedy.

In prison, Kannayya finds solace in the company of Raju, the son of the jailor. Padma, who is Raju's tutor, plays a supportive role in his life. Meanwhile, a notorious criminal, Durgarayudu, kidnaps Raju and escapes from prison. Determined to save Raju, Kannayya escapes and takes refuge in Padma's house. Singaram, a small-time thief who is in love with Padma, joins Kannayya in his quest.

The local police inspector eventually captures Paparao, while Kannayya, with Padma's help, tracks down Durgarayudu's hideout. Padma aids in the search by singing a song in the streets that she had previously taught Raju, leading them to the criminal's location. Durgarayudu is apprehended, Raju is rescued, and Kannayya is exonerated of all charges. In the end, Kannayya marries Madhavi, bringing the story to a resolution.

== Cast ==
- Kantha Rao as Kannayya
- Rajanala as Durgarayudu
- Gummadi as the jailor
- Relangi as Singaram
- Rajasulochana as Padma
- Girija as Madhavi
- Baby Savithri as Raju
- K. V. S. Sarma as Paparao
- Baby Suma as Ravi
- Balakrishna as Ramu
- K. S. Reddy as the inspector

== Production ==
Khaidi Kannayya is a remake of the Hindi film Qaidi No. 911 (1959), written by C. J. Pavri. It was produced by Pothina Doondeswara Rao, presented by Sundarlal Nahata under Rajalakshmi Productions, and directed by B. Vittalacharya. The film, however, more closely followed Qaidi No. 911's Tamil version Kaithi Kannayiram (1960), except for the climax, which was re-written the way Vittalacharya pleased. Chandru and Govindaswamy were hired as cinematographer and editor respectively, while G. Krishnamurthy wrote the dialogues and lyrics. Rajasulochana and Daisy Irani, who appeared in Kaithi Kannayiram, reprised their roles in Khaidi Kannayya, with Irani again being billed in the credits as "Baby Savithri". The climax was shot at Hogenakkal, Tamil Nadu.

== Soundtrack ==
The soundtrack was composed by Rajan–Nagendra. The song "Teeya Teeyani Tenela Maatalato", sung by P. Susheela, is based on "Meethi Meethi Baton Se" from the Hindi original, and "Ee Nijam Telusuko", sung by P. B. Sreenivas and S. Janaki, is based on "Ek Sawal My Karun" from Sasural (1961). Two other songs were "Andaala Kalla Choodu" by Susheela, and "Premaku Kaanuka Kaavalena", sung by her and Madhavapeddi Satyam.

Track listing
No.	Title	Lyrics	Singer(s)	Length
1.	"Ee Nijam Telusuko"	G. Krishnamurthy	P. B. Sreenivas, S. Janaki
2.	"Chotekkada Chusedeppudu"	G. Krishnamurthy	P. Susheela
3.	"Theeya Theeyani Thenela Matalatho"	G. Krishnamurthy	P. Susheela, R. Rajasri
4.	"Yavvanam Adhi"	G. Krishnamurthy	P. Susheela, Chorus
5.	"Premaku Kanuka Kavalena"	G. Krishnamurthy	P. Susheela, Madhavapeddi Satyam
6.	"Andhala Kallu Chudu"	G. Krishnamurthy	P. Susheela
7.	"Theeya Theeyani Thenela Matalatho" (Pathos)	G. Krishnamurthy	P. Susheela, R. Rajasri

== Release and reception ==
Khaidi Kannayya was released on 1 March 1962. The film became a box office success, running for over 100 days in theatres.
