= Rowdy Ranganna =

Rowdy Renganna
- Directed by: R. Ramamurthy
- Written by: A. K. Velan
- Produced by: R. Ramamurthy
- Starring: Rajkumar; Rajashankar; Jayanthi; Chandrakala
- Cinematography: B. Dorairaj
- Edited by: R. Ramamurthy
- Music by: Satyam
- Production company: Sri Rama Enterprise
- Distributed by: Sri Rama Enterprise
- Release date: 1968
- Country: India
- Language: Kannada

Rowdy Ranganna is a 1968 Indian Kannada-language film, directed and produced by R. Ramamurthy. The film stars Rajkumar, Jayanthi, Raja Shankar, Chandrakala, Balakrishna and Dinesh, with music by Satyam. It is a remake of the Tamil film Thai Pirandhal Vazhi Pirakkum (1958).

== Cast ==
- Dr. Rajkumar as Ranga
- Jayanthi as Sharada
- Chandrakala as Gowri
- Raja Shankar as Shankar
- Balakrishna as Siddappa
- Dinesh
- M. N. Lakshmi Devi
- B. K. Eshwarappa
- Rathnakar
- Bhagavan
- Ganapathi Bhat
- H. R. Shastry
- Shyam
- Hanumantha Rao
- Comedian Guggu
- Iyengar
- Chakravarthy
- Ramadevi
- Indira
- Lalitha
- Narasimharaju in cameo
- Pandari Bai in cameo
- Radhabai in cameo

== Soundtrack ==
The music was composed by Satyam with all lyrics written by Chi. Udayashankar.

The song "Daranige Giri Bharave" was based on the song "Mannukku Maram Baarama" from the original Tamil version - the same song was also used in the Telugu remake Manchi Manasuku Manchi Rojulu as "Dharaniki Giri Bharama".

No.	Song	Singer(s)	Length (m:ss)
1	"Baare O Cheluve"	S. P. Balasubrahmanyam	03:29
2	"O Geleya Ramaiah"	P. B. Sreenivas, S. Janaki	
3	"Aadaddhu Ondu"	P. B. Sreenivas	03:02
4	"Daranige Giri Bharave"	P. Susheela	03:27
5	"Kanneradu Nanage"	P. B. Sreenivas, S. Janaki	03:56
