= Muriyada Mane =

- Directed by: Y. R. Swamy
- Written by: M. S. Solaimalai
- Based on: Bhaaga Pirivinai by A. Bhimsingh
- Produced by: G. H. Veeranna; C. R. Basavaraju; S. Gurunath
- Starring: Rajkumar; Udaykumar; K. S. Ashwath; Balakrishna
- Cinematography: R. Madhu
- Edited by: R. Hanumatha Rao
- Music by: Vijaya Krishnamurthy
- Production company: Karnataka Films
- Distributed by: Karnataka Films
- Release date: 16 September 1964
- Country: India
- Language: Kannada

Muriyada Mane is a 1964 Indian Kannada-language film, directed by Y. R. Swamy and produced by G. H. Veeranna, C. R. Basavaraju and S. Gurunath. The film stars Rajkumar, Udaykumar, K. S. Ashwath and Balakrishna. The film has musical score by Vijaya Krishnamurthy. The film was a remake of the 1959 Tamil film Bhaaga Pirivinai. The film became a commercial success at the box office.

== Cast ==
- Dr. Rajkumar as Chenna
- Udaykumar as Devegowda
- K. S. Ashwath as Ramegowda
- Balakrishna as Boregowda
- Narasimharaju as Boregowda's buttler (cameo)
- Srikantaswamy
- Maheshwaraiah
- Narayana
- R. N. Magadi
- Pandari Bai as Shanti
- Jayanthi as Malli
- Papamma as Rudri
- Jr. Revathi
- Vanisri
- Indrani

== Soundtrack ==
The music was composed by Vijaya Krishnamurthy.

No.	Song	Singers	Lyrics	Length (m:ss)
1	"Mathiheena Naanade"	P. B. Sreenivas	Ku. Ra. Seetharam Shastry	03:49
2	"Nammoora Chennayya"	Ghantasala; L. R. Eswari	Ku. Ra. Seetharam Shastry	03:23
3	"Anda Chendavethake"	P. Susheela	Ku. Ra. Seetharam Shastry	03:07
4	"Therige hoomudithu"	P. Susheela; P. B. Sreenivas	Ku. Ra. Seetharam Shastry	03:07
