= Valmiki (1963 Telugu film) =

1963 film by C. S. Rao in Telugu

- Theatrical release poster
- Directed by: C. S. Rao
- Written by: Samudrala Sr (dialogues)
- Screenplay by: C. S. Rao
- Produced by: S. K. Habeebulla
- Starring: N. T. Rama Rao; Rajasulochana; Leelavathi
- Cinematography: M. A. Rehman
- Edited by: K. Govinda Swamy
- Music by: Ghantasala
- Production company: Jupiter Pictures
- Release date: 9 February 1963
- Running time: 138 minutes
- Country: India
- Language: Telugu

Valmiki is 1963 Indian Telugu-language Hindu mythological film, based on the life of Valmiki, produced by S. K. Habibulla under Jupiter Pictures and directed by C. S. Rao. The films stars N. T. Rama Rao, Rajasulochana and Leelavathi with music composed by Ghantasala. Director Rao and Jupiter Pictures made the film simultaneously in Kannada with the same title starring Rajkumar in the lead role retaining most of the cast and crew.

== Plot ==
The film begins with Siva proclaiming Parvati that soon vital letters of Vishnu Ra & himself Ma are resurrected as Rama, which is feasible by a notorious tribe burglar Raksha. At a point, Raksha strikes on Princess Kalyani, who endears him despite his profession and makes him accompany her. The king is about to gratify Raksha when his identity is unveiled and seized, but he flees with Kalyani's aid. Amid, he is shot and secured by a wild girl, Tara, and they crush. Parallelly, Kalyani's disquiet proceeds for Raksha and nags to knit her. So, Tara tricks by forging her death, accusing Kalyani, who goes to the end of the lunatic. The king pleads with Raksha to secure her. Ergo, he drives her when she is startled to behold Tara alive and splicing Raksha. So, Kalyani leaves her breath, cursing Tara to die by grieving away from her husband. Following, the couple leads a gleeful time when Tara urges Nagaratna Maala, the necklace of precious stones of the snakes that Raksha oaths to bestow her with. Learning its presence in the head of the snakes, he decapitates a myriad that plays havoc with Adi Seshu. Next, Raksha detects the necklace on the idol Lakshmi in Ayodhya when it desecrates and steals it, and the enraged goddess vanishes it.

Consequently, Vishnu affirms they will soon get an ineffable bond with him. Accordingly, he endorses Narada to mold Raksha into a fit man who proceeds with the Nagaratna Maala. Today, Narada is about to provide it for Raksha if his family would share his sin incurring and asks to confirm. Beyond doubt, Raksha gets hit back when he goes out of remorse and understands the truth of life. Narada enlightens him with Ashtashari, who sets to immense penance. Above, Tara conjoins in his sacred act but dies in between. Following Narada gets wind arising of Rama before long who states it to Raksha in vice versa "Mara" instead of the phonetic anagram circumvents the restriction and his chanting tunes to it. Eras roll by when Siva sheds light on Raksha, nobilitating him as Valmiki: one born out of anthills who resides constructing an Ashram. Besides, Vishnu advances in the guise of the tribe to eliminate two demons roaming on earth as birds and ground one for which the second laminates. Spotting it, Valmiki curses him to weep by detaching from his wife. Thus, the universe gets panicky when Vishnu seeks to be calm, glorifying it as a welcome sign of Ramavatar. Being aware of the entire episode, Valmiki collapses for his grave sin but recoups with impetus. Finally, the movie ends with Valmiki composing the holy epic Ramayana."

== Cast ==
- N. T. Rama Rao as Raksha / Valmiki
- Kalyanam Raghuramaiah as Narada Maharshi
- Rajasulochana as Taara
- Leelavathi as Princess Kalyani
- Kantha Rao as Lord Vishnu
- Rajanala as Dundubhi
- Padmanabham as Bhethala
- Mikkilineni as King
- Dr. Sivaramakrishnaiah
- Sarada as Goddess Lakshmi
- Meena Kumari as Patala

== Soundtrack ==
Music composed by Ghantasala. The lyrics were written by Samudrala Sr.

| S. No. | Song title | Singers | length |
|---|---|---|---|
| 1 | "Andachandalalona" | P. Susheela | 3:12 |
| 2 | "Mudamu Kanedepudo" | S. Janaki, P. Leela | 4:09 |
| 3 | "Anuragamila Konasagavale" | Ghantasala, P. Susheela | 4:00 |
| 4 | "Pothanantade" | Raghavulu, Satyam, A. P. Komala | 2:56 |
| 5 | "Tallalene Tallalene" | Raghavulu, A. P. Komala | 3:10 |
| 6 | "Rathi Gundiya Needi" | Ghantasala | 0:33 |
| 7 | "Kanthude Pranamaguchu" | S. Janaki | 0:46 |
| 8 | "Hare Narayana" | Raghuramaiah | 2:31 |
| 9 | "Parama Tarakamantramella" | Raghuramaiah | 1:20 |
| 10 | "Jaya Jaya Nataraja" | Ghantasala | 5:36 |
| 11 | "Hariye Velayunuga" | Ghantasala | 2:33 |
| 12 | "Sri Ramayana Kaavya Katha" | Ghantasala | 13:14 |
