= A. Bhimsingh =

Indian filmmaker, producer, editor, and writer

- Born: 15 October 1924; Rayalacheruvu, Madras Presidency, British India
- Died: 16 January 1978 (aged 53); Madras, Tamil Nadu, India
- Occupations: editor, director, producer, writer
- Years active: 1949–1978
- Spouses: Sona (m. 1949) Sukumari (m. 1959)
- Children: B. Lenin; B. Kannan; Suresh Bhimsingh
- Relatives: Travancore family

A. Bhimsingh or Bhim Singh (15 October 1924–16 January 1978) was an Indian filmmaker who worked predominantly in Tamil cinema. He also made films in other languages, including 18 films in Hindi, 8 in Telugu, 5 in Malayalam and 1 film in Kannada. Hailing from Andhra Pradesh, he started his film career as an assistant editor with the film-making duo Krishnan–Panju in the late 1940s. Later, he became an assistant director before evolving as an independent director. His films mainly dealt with family and relationships. He made a series of films all of which started with the Tamil syllable pa, mainly with Sivaji Ganesan.

== Personal life ==
In 1949, Bhimsingh married Sona, the sister of Krishnan, in 1949. He had eight children with her; one of their children, B. Lenin, is a film editor, and another son, B. Kannan, was a cinematographer known for his frequent collaborations with Bharathiraja. Later, Bhimsingh's eldest son Naren married Panju's daughter. Bhimsingh married actress Sukumari in 1959 and has a son Suresh Bhimsingh.

== Filmography ==
Year	Film	Banner	Language	Screenwriter	Notes
1954	Ammaiyappan	National Productions	Tamil	M. Karunanidhi	Directorial debut
1956	Raja Rani	National Productions	Tamil	M. Karunanidhi	
1958	Pathi Bakthi	Budda Pictures	Tamil	Valampuri Somanathan	screenplay, dialogues and editor credits
1958	Thirumanam	Valampuri Pictures	Tamil	M. S. Solamalai	
1959	Ponnu Vilaiyum Bhoomi	Oriental Pictures	Tamil		
1959	President Panchatcharam	Savitri Pictures	Tamil	B. S. Ramaiah	
1959	Bhaaga Pirivinai	Saravana Films	Tamil	M. S. Solamalai	
1959	Sahodhari	Carnatic Films	Tamil	Murasoli Maran	
1960	Aai Phirse Bahar		Hindi	M. Karunanidhi	
1960	Padikkadha Medhai	Bala Movies	Tamil	Asha Poorna Devi	
1960	Kalathur Kannamma	AVM Productions	Tamil	Javar Seetharaman	Dubbed in Telugu as Mavoori Ammayi
1960	Petra Manam	National Pictures	Tamil	Mu. Varadarajan	
1961	Pava Mannippu	Budhdha Pictures	Tamil	M. S. Solamalai	National Film Award for Second Best Feature Film; Dubbed in Telugu as Papa Pariharam
1961	Pasamalar	Rajamani Pictures	Tamil	K. P. Kottarakkara	
1961	Paalum Pazhamum	Saravana Films	Tamil	G. Balasubramaniam, Pasumani	Remade as Saathi
1962	Paarthaal Pasi Theerum	AVM Productions	Tamil	A. C. Tirulokchandar	
1962	Padithaal Mattum Podhuma	Ranganathan Pictures	Tamil	Tharashankar Bandopadhyay	
1962	Rakhi		Hindi		Remake of Pasamalar
1962	Senthamarai	Madras Pictures	Tamil	Rama Arangannal	
1962	Bandha Pasam	Santhi Films	Tamil	Valampuri Somanathan	
1962	Main Chup Rahungi	AVM Productions	Hindi		Remake of Kalathur Kannamma
1963	Paar Magaley Paar	Kasturi Films	Tamil	Pattu	Based on stage play Petralthan Pillaiya
1964	Pachchai Vilakku	Vel Pictures	Tamil	G. K. Suriyam	
1964	Pooja Ke Phool	AVM Productions	Hindi	K. S. Gopalakrishnan	Remake of Kumudham, directed by Adurthi Subba Rao
1965	Pazhani	Bharatha Matha Pictures	Tamil	G. V. Iyer	
1965	Santhi	ALS Productions	Tamil	M. S. Solaimalai	
1965	Khandan	Vasu Films	Hindi	M. S. Solaimalai	Remake of Bhaaga Pirivinai
1966	Sadhu Mirandal	Sunbeam Productions	Tamil	Writer and producer	
1967	Pattathu Rani	Sunbeam Productions	Tamil	Producer	
1967	Mehrban	AVM Productions	Hindi		Remake of Padikkadha Medhai; Nominated, Filmfare Award for Best Director
1967	Paaladai	Kamala Pictures	Tamil	Bilahari (T. Raman)	
1967	Aalayam	Sunbeam Productions	Tamil		Writer and producer
1968	Gauri	Sivaji Films	Hindi		Remake of Santhi
1968	Aadmi	PSV Pictures	Hindi	Akhtar ul Iman; Kaushal Bharati; Ramarao; Shamanna	Remake of K. Shankar's Aalayamani
1968	Sadhu Aur Shaitaan		Hindi	Usilai Somanathan	Remake of Sadhu Mirandal
1969	Manishichina Maguva		Telugu		
1969	Bhai Bahen		Hindi		
1970	Paadhukaappu	Sunbeam Productions	Tamil	Paasumani	
1970	Gopi		Hindi		Remake of B. R. Panthulu's Chinnada Gombe
1970	Oke Kutumbham		Telugu		
1972	Sub Ka Saathi		Hindi		
1972	Maalik		Hindi		
1972	Maa Inti Jyothi		Telugu		
1972	Joroo Ka Ghulam		Hindi		
1973	Loafer	Century Films	Hindi	Jagdish Kanwal	
1974	Paadha Poojai	Kasiram Pictures	Tamil		
1974	Naya Din Nai Raat		Hindi	A. P. Nagarajan	Remake of A. P. Nagarajan's Navarathiri
1975	Raagam	Jammu Films	Malayalam	S. L. Puram Sadanandan	
1975	Bhagyashalulu		Telugu		
1976	Sila Nerangalil Sila Manithargal	ABS Productions	Tamil	Jayakanthan	
1976	Kanavan Manaivi	Sri Umachitra Combines	Tamil	Kalaignanam	Remade as Haisiyat
1976	Chiranjeevi		Telugu		
1976	Bangaru Manishi		Telugu		
1977	Yaaron Ka Yaar		Hindi		
1977	Nirakudum	Swapna Films	Malayalam	Surasu	Remake of Bhaaga Pirivinai
1977	Sneham	JS Films	Malayalam	Sreekumaran Thampi	
1977	Nee Vazha Vendum	Fathima Amuda Combines	Tamil		
1977	Amaanat		Hindi		
1977	Evaru Devudu		Telugu		
1978	Vamsha Jyothi	Sri Rama Enterprises	Kannada		
1978	Oru Nadigai Natakam Parkiral	Girnar Films	Tamil	Jayakanthan	
1978	Mishiha Charitram		Malayalam		Dubbed into Tamil and Telugu
1978	Kai Pidithaaval	Ganeshanjali Productions	Tamil		
1978	Maattoly	Swapna Films	Malayalam	R. Balakrishnan	
1978	Iraivan Kodutha Varam	Raja Cine Arts	Tamil	R. Balakrishnan	
1978	Karunamayudu	Vijayachander; Rev. Louis F. Knoll; STBC	Telugu	Fr. Christopher Coelho, O.F.M.	Bhimsingh also acted as Judas Iscariot. Dubbed in Hindi as Daya Sagar, Tamil as Karunamoorthy and English as Ocean of Mercy.
1978	Karunai Ullam	MSV Movies	Tamil		

== Pa series ==
Many of Bhimsingh's films began with the syllable Pa, starred Sivaji Ganesan, had music by Viswanathan–Ramamoorthy, and lyrics by Kannadasan. According to Ganesan, Bhimsingh hardly imagined that he would make a series of films that began with the letter Pa, implying that he "might have thought about it at first because his name starts with the same letter in Tamil. Later he might have decided to stay on with this letter for sentimental reasons."

Year	Film	Banner	Music	Actors
1958	Pathi Bakthi	Buddha Pictures	Viswanathan–Ramamoorthy	Sivaji Ganesan, Gemini Ganesan, Savithri, M. N. Rajam, T. S. Balaiah, J. P. Chandrababu, V. Nagayya, C. R. Vijayakumari
1959	Bhaaga Pirivinai	Saravana Films	Viswanathan–Ramamoorthy	Sivaji Ganesan, B. Saroja Devi, M. R. Radha, T. S. Balaiah, S. V. Subbaiah, M. N. Nambiar, M. V. Rajamma
1960	Padikkadha Medhai	Bala Movies	K. V. Mahadevan	Sivaji Ganesan, Sowcar Janaki, S. V. Ranga Rao, P. Kannamba, T. R. Ramachandran, R. Muthuraman, E. V. Saroja, V. Gopalakrishnan
1961	Pasamalar	Rajamani Pictures	Viswanathan–Ramamoorthy	Sivaji Ganesan, Gemini Ganesan, Savithri, M. N. Rajam, M. N. Nambiar, K. A. Thangavelu
1961	Palum Pazhamum	Saravana Films	Viswanathan–Ramamoorthy	Sivaji Ganesan, B. Saroja Devi, Sowcar Janaki, Prem Nazir, T. S. Balaiah, S. V. Subbaiah, V. Nagayya, Sriram, Manorama
1961	Paava Mannippu	Budhdha Pictures	Viswanathan–Ramamoorthy	Sivaji Ganesan, Gemini Ganesan, Savithri, Devika, V. Nagayya, M. R. Radha, T. S. Balaiah, S. V. Subbaiah, M. V. Rajamma
1962	Bandha Pasam	Santhi Films	Viswanathan–Ramamoorthy	Sivaji Ganesan, Gemini Ganesan, Savithri, Devika, S. V. Ranga Rao, M. V. Rajamma, J. P. Chandrababu
1962	Parthal Pasi Theerum	AVM	Viswanathan–Ramamoorthy	Sivaji Ganesan, Gemini Ganesan, Savithri, Sowcar Janaki, B. Saroja Devi, Kamal Haasan
1962	Padithal Mattum Podhuma	Ranganathan Pictures	Viswanathan–Ramamoorthy	Sivaji Ganesan, K. Balaji, Savithri, Rajasulochana, M. R. Radha, S. V. Ranga Rao, S. V. Sahasranamam, P. Kannamba, M. V. Rajamma, R. Muthuraman
1963	Paar Magaley Paar	Kasturi Films	Viswanathan–Ramamoorthy	Sivaji Ganesan, Sowcar Janaki, R. Muthuraman, A. V. M. Rajan, C. R. Vijayakumari, Pushpalatha, M. R. Radha, V. K. Ramasamy
1964	Pachhai Vilakku	Vel Pictures	Viswanathan–Ramamoorthy	Sivaji Ganesan, S. S. Rajendran, A. V. M. Rajan, Sowcar Janaki, C. R. Vijayakumari, Pushpalatha, V. Nagayya, Nagesh, S. V. Ranga Rao, Sriram
1965	Pazhani	Bharatha Matha Pictures	Viswanathan–Ramamoorthy	Sivaji Ganesan, Sriram, S. S. Rajendran, R. Muthuraman, Devika, Pushpalatha, T. S. Balaiah, M. R. Radha
1967	Paaladai	Kamala Pictures	K. V. Mahadevan	Sivaji Ganesan, Padmini. K. R. Vijaya, V. K. Ramasamy, Nagesh, V. Gopalakrishnan, Manorama
1970	Paadhukaappu	Sunbeam Productions	M. S. Viswanathan	Sivaji Ganesan, Jayalalithaa, T. S. Balaiah, Major Sundararajan, M. N. Nambiar, Nagesh, J. P. Chandrababu, Sowcar Janaki

== As an actor ==
- 1975: Cinema Paithyam

== Recurring collaborators ==
Bhimsingh frequently associated with the same crew members. These included the assistant director duo Thirumalai–Mahalingam (who later became proper directors on films produced and written by Bhimsingh), cinematographer G. Vittal Rao and editor A. Paul Duraisingh. Ganesan appeared in 18 films directed by Bhimsingh, starting with Raja Rani (1956).

== Accolades ==
National Film Awards

- 1959: President's silver medal for Best Feature Film in Tamil – Bhaaga Pirivinai
- 1960: Certificate of Merit for Best Feature Film in Tamil – Kalathur Kannamma
- 1961: All India Certificate of Merit for the Second Best Feature Film – Paava Mannippu
- 1961: Certificate of Merit for Second Best Feature Film in Tamil – Pasamalar
- 1964: Certificate of Merit for Second Best Feature Film in Tamil – Pazhani
