= Barkha (film) =

1959 film by Krishnan–Panju

- Poster
- Directed by: Krishnan–Panju
- Screenplay by: D.N. Devesh; Rajendra Krishan
- Based on: Thai Pirandhal Vazhi Pirakkum by A. K. Velan
- Produced by: A. V. Meiyappan
- Starring: Jagdeep; Nanda
- Music by: Chitragupta
- Production company: AVM Productions
- Release date: 1959
- Country: India
- Language: Hindi

Barkha (transl. Monsoon) is a 1959 Indian Hindi-language drama film directed by Krishnan–Panju and produced by A. V. Meiyappan. It is a remake of the Tamil film Thai Pirandhal Vazhi Pirakkum (1958). The film stars Jagdeep and Nanda. It was a commercial success.

== Cast ==
- Jagdeep as Ajit
- Nanda as Parvati
- Shubha Khote as Madhu
- Leela Chitnis as Mrs. Haridas
- Anant Kumar as Dr. Manohar
- David as Zamindar Haridas
- Mukri as Shambu
- Ulhas as the inspector

== Production ==
Barkha was a remake of the Tamil film Thai Pirandhal Vazhi Pirakkum, released in 1958. It was directed by the duo Krishnan–Panju, and produced by A. V. Meiyappan under AVM Productions. This film included a bullfight not present in the original. Lead actor Jagdeep was paid ₹750 (equivalent to ₹69,000 or US$710 in 2023) as a monthly salary, and lead actress Nanda was paid ₹15,000 (equivalent to ₹1.4 million or US$14,000 in 2023).

== Soundtrack ==
The soundtrack was composed by Chitragupta. All songs of the film were written by Rajendra Krishan. The song "Ek Raat Mein Do Do Chand Khile" attained popularity.

| Song | Singer |
|---|---|
| "Barkha Bahar Aayi" | Lata Mangeshkar |
| "Poochhungi Ek Din" | Lata Mangeshkar |
| "Tadpaoge Tadpa Lo" | Lata Mangeshkar |
| "Oonche Parbat Gehre Sagar" | Lata Mangeshkar |
| "Ek Raat Mein Do Do Chand Khile" | Lata Mangeshkar; Mukesh |
| "Woh Door Jo Nadiya Behti Hai, Wahan Ek Albeli Rehti Hai" | Lata Mangeshkar; Mohammed Rafi |
| "Sur Badle Kaise Kaise Dekho" | Mohammed Rafi |
| "Pyar Kiya Nahin Jata" | Mohammed Rafi |
| "Aadmi Chirag Hai" | Mohammed Rafi |

== Reception ==
Barkha was commercially successful, grossing ₹35 lakh (equivalent to ₹31 crore or US$3.3 million in 2023) against a budget of ₹5 lakh (equivalent to ₹4.5 crore or US$470,000 in 2023), according to an estimate by Meiyappan's son Saravanan.

== Bibliography ==
- Saravanan, M. (2013) [2005]. AVM 60 Cinema (in Tamil) (3rd ed.). Rajarajan Pathippagam. OCLC 1158347612.
