= Mayavanathan =

Tamil poet and lyricist

Mayavanathan மாயவநாதன்
- Born: 16 April 1936; Poolankulam, Tinnevely District, Madras Presidency, British India (now in Tenkasi district, Tamil Nadu, India)
- Died: 6 August 1971 (aged 35); Madras (now Chennai), Tamil Nadu, India
- Occupation: poet

Mayavanathan was a Tamil poet and lyricist in Tamil Cinema.

== Biography ==
He was born on 16 April 1936 in Poolankulam, a village near Alangulam in present-day Tenkasi district of Tamil Nadu.

== Filmography ==
Color key

Posthumous release

Year	Film	Song	Singer(s)	Music	Direction
1962	Bandha Pasam	"Eppo Vechikalam"	J. P. Chandrababu	Viswanathan–Ramamoorthy	A. Bhimsingh
1962	Bandha Pasam	"Idhazh Mottu Virindhida"	P. B. Sreenivas, P. Susheela	Viswanathan–Ramamoorthy	A. Bhimsingh
1962	Bandha Pasam	"Kavalaigal Kidaikattum"	T. M. Soundararajan, P. B. Sreenivas	Viswanathan–Ramamoorthy	A. Bhimsingh
1962	Bandha Pasam	"Nitham Nitham"	Sirkazhi Govindarajan	Viswanathan–Ramamoorthy	A. Bhimsingh
1962	Padithal Mattum podhuma	Thannilavu Theniraikka	P.Susheela	Viswanathan–Ramamoorthy	A.Bhimsingh
1963	Idhayathil Nee	"Chithira Poovizhi"	P. Susheela, L. R. Eswari	Viswanathan–Ramamoorthy	Muktha Srinivasan
1964	Poompuhar	"Thappitthu Vandhanamma"	K. B. Sundarambal	R. Sudarsanam	P. Neelakantan
1964	Poompuhar	"Andru Kollum"	K. B. Sundarambal	R. Sudarsanam	P. Neelakantan
1964	Poompuhar	"Kaaviri Penne"	P. Susheela, T. M. Soundararajan	R. Sudarsanam	P. Neelakantan
1964	Poompuhar	"Thamizh Engal Uyiranathu"	P. Susheela	R. Sudarsanam	P. Neelakantan
1964	Poompuhar	"Thunbamellam"	K. B. Sundarambal	R. Sudarsanam	P. Neelakantan
1964	Poompuhar	"Thottavudan Malaronru"	K. B. Sundarambal	R. Sudarsanam	P. Neelakantan
1964	Thozhilali				
1965	Thaayin Karunai				
1965	Ennathan Mudivu				
1965	Poomalai				
1966	Marakka Mudiyuma?				
1966	Kathal Paduthum Padu	"Ivaloru Azhagiya"	T. M. Soundararajan, P. Susheela	T. R. Pappa	Joseph Thaliath Jr.
1966	Kathal Paduthum Padu	"Meladai Katrada"	P. Susheela	T. R. Pappa	Joseph Thaliath Jr.
1967	Karpooram				
1968	Ther Thiruvizha				
1968	Deiveega Uravu				
1968	Lakshmi Kalyanam				
1969	Magizhampoo				
1969	Kaaval Dheivam				
1969	Thalattu				
1971	Therottam				
1972	Delhi to Madras †				
1975	Thiruvarul †				

== Death ==
Mayavanathan died on 6 August 1971 in Madras. His body was taken to Poolangulam for the funeral. Kannadasan was one of the mourners.
