= Sollu Thambi Sollu =

1959 film by T. V. Sundaram

- Poster
- Directed by: T. V. Sundaram
- Based on: As You Like It by William Shakespeare
- Produced by: T. V. Sundaram
- Starring: Prem Nazir; Rajasulochana
- Music by: K. V. Mahadevan
- Production company: T. V. S. Productions
- Release date: 27 March 1959
- Country: India
- Language: Tamil

Sollu Thambi Sollu (transl. Tell Me, Brother) is a 1959 Indian Tamil-language romantic comedy film produced and directed by T. V. Sundaram. It is an adaptation of the William Shakespeare play As You Like It. The film stars Prem Nazir and Rajasulochana. It was released on 27 March 1959, and did not succeed commercially.

== Plot ==
Chinnathambi, the only son of a wealthy estate owner Sundaram Pillai, falls in love with Kalyani, the daughter of a poor clerk, but their romance faces obstacles.

== Cast ==
- Prem Nazir as Chinnathambi
- Rajasulochana as Kalyani
- S. S. Rajendran
- M. N. Nambiar
- T. S. Muthaiah
- K. Sarangapani
- Friend Ramasamy
- G. Sakunthala
- T. A. Mathuram
- S. D. Subbulakshmi
- K. S. Angamuthu

== Production ==
Sollu Thambi Sollu is an adaptation of the William Shakespeare play As You Like It, and was in development as early as July 1958. It was directed by T. V. Sundaram, who also produced the film under his own company T. V. S. Productions; that company was an offshot of Modern Theatres, focusing on low-budget films. The dialogues were written by Vindhan. The final length of the film was 16,053 metres (52,667 ft).

== Soundtrack ==
The soundtrack was composed by K. V. Mahadevan.

Song	Singer/s	Lyrics	Duration
"Panbodu Ennaalume"	Seerkazhi Govindarajan & P. Susheela	A. Maruthakasi	03:02
"Kavalai Ariyaamal"	P. Susheela	A. Maruthakasi	03:35
"Aasai Mozhi Pesuthu"	Seerkazhi Govindarajan & Jikki	A. Maruthakasi	03:13
"Solvadhu Onnu"	P. Susheela	A. Maruthakasi	03:35
"Ulagaala Uruvaana Kalai"	P. Susheela	A. Maruthakasi	02:58
"Vattamittu Ennai Kettalaiya"	S. C. Krishnan	A. Maruthakasi	
"Nere Ennai Nimirnthu"	S. C. Krishnan & L. R. Eswari	A. Maruthakasi	
"Soodaadha Malaraai"	R. Balasaraswathi Devi	T. V. Kalyani	03:00

== Release ==
Sollu Thambi Sollu was released on 27 March 1959, and did not succeed commercially.

== Bibliography ==
- Baskaran, S. Theodore (1996). The Eye of the Serpent: An Introduction to Tamil Cinema. Chennai: East West Books. OCLC 243920437.
- Paramasivam, M. (2001). திரையுலகில் விந்தன் [Vindhan in the world of cinema] (in Tamil). Chennai: Arul Pathipagam. OCLC 50714256.
