= Ponnu Vilayum Bhoomi =

Film directed by A. Bhimsingh

- Poster
- Directed by: A. Bhimsingh
- Written by: (Dialogues) Erama. Arangannal
- Screenplay by: A. Bhimsingh
- Produced by: P. K. Satyapal
- Starring: Gemini Ganesan; Padmini; Ragini
- Cinematography: G. Vittal Rao
- Edited by: A. Bhimsingh; A. Paul Duraisingh; A. Thangaraj
- Music by: K. H. Reddy
- Production company: Oriental Movies
- Release date: 1959
- Country: India
- Language: Tamil

Ponnu Vilayum Bhoomi (transl. Land of gold) is a 1959 Indian Tamil-language drama film directed by A. Bhimsingh. The film stars Gemini Ganesan and Padmini.

== Plot ==
Nagan is a farmer who owns a fertile farming land in Vayalur. Nagan is an honest and hardworking person who considers his farming land as his temple. Though the land is fertile, at times the yield is not so good. He has a son called Nallaan who is a brave and fearless young lad. Nagan decides to marry Nallaan to a girl called Muthamma. She is a pretty girl who works as a house maid in the house of a rich man called Balakotinathar. Her father has left her in that position and had run away to Malaysia. Nagan had to borrow money from the rich man Balakotinathar for the wedding ceremony of Nallaan and Muthamma. As the days pass by, Nallaan and Muthamma have a son. They name him Inban. Nagan is unable to settle the loan. Balakotinathar threatens to sue the family. So, the family decides to abandon the village and migrate to Chennai in search of employment. They hand over their properties in lieu of the loan. Nallan tells Balakotinathar that he will pay the balance money some day and recover the land. Balakotinathar's benevolent wife gives them an amount of money for them to survive in Chennai. However, when the family arrives in Chennai some cheaters take all their money. Left with nothing the family gets dissipated. The child gets lost. Nallaan goes away in search of earning money. Muthamma and Nagan are left alone. How the family is reunited and recovers their land forms the rest of the story.

== Cast ==
Male cast

- Gemini Ganesan as Nallan
- T. S. Balaiah as Rathnam
- J. P. Chandrababu as Samadharmam
- S. V. Subbaiah as Nagan
- D. Balasubramaniam as Balakodi Mudaliar
- Master Sridhar as Husband

Female cast

- Padmini as Muthamma
- Ragini as Roopa
- Sukumari as Kala
- Lakshmikantham as Sundari
- P. Chandra as Thayamma
- K. S. Angamuthu as Gundamma

Support cast

- P. K. Satyapal, Rama Rao, M. N. Krishnan, Nellai Azhagiyasundaram, G. N. Mahalingam, Gemini Balu, V. K. Achari, and Nambirajan.

== Production ==
Ponnu Vilayum Bhoomi is the film was produced by P. K. Sathyapal under the banner Oriental Movies, and was directed by A. Bhimsingh who also wrote the screenplay and edited the film. The story and dialogues were penned by Erama. Arangannal. G. Vittal Rao handled the cinematography. Choreography was done by Hiralal, Sohanlal, Chinnilal and Sampath. The film was shot at Newtone and Neptune studios.

== Soundtrack ==
Music was composed by K. H. Reddy. The song "Sollaamathaan Purinjikalaame" and "Ulagam Nappathellaam.... Naattu Nadappu Ellam" did not take place in the film. The title song deals with the plight of farmers.

Song	Singer/s	Lyricist	Length
"Koththumalli Poo Pookka"	T. M. Soundararajan	A. Maruthakasi	03:46
"Sellakkiliye Sendhamaraiye"	Jikki & S. Janaki	A. Maruthakasi	03:40
"Urulum Panam Munne"	K. Jamuna Rani	A. Maruthakasi	04:47
"Karumbaana Yen Vaazhvu"	P. Susheela	A. Maruthakasi	
"Aangila Naagarigam Nalladhu"	K. Jamuna Rani & P. Susheela	K. S. Gopalakrishnan	08:33
"Pon Vilaiyum Boomilyile.... Kudumba Vandi Kudu Kudu Endru"	C. S. Jayaraman	Thiruchi Thiyagarajan	03:03
"Kanniyur Saalaiyile"	T. M. Soundararajan & P. Susheela	Pattukkottai Kalyanasundaram	03:51
"Mannit Pirandhaan"	Sirkazhi Govindarajan	Kannadasan	
"Aanandham Unmai"	K. Jamuna Rani	Kannadasan	05:41
"Sollaamathaan Purinjikalaame"	T. M. Soundararajan & P. Susheela	A. Maruthakasi	03:15
"Ulagam Nappathellaam.... Naattu Nadappu Ellam"	T. M. Soundararajan	A. Maruthakasi	03:03

== Reception ==
Kanthan of Kalki appreciated the film's story and cast performances.
