= Raja Rani (1956 film) =

1956 film by A. Bhimsingh

- Theatrical release poster
- Directed by: A. Bhimsingh
- Written by: Mu. Karunanidhi
- Starring: Sivaji Ganesan; Padmini
- Cinematography: Jiten Banerji (supervisor); G. Vittal Rao
- Edited by: A. Bhimsingh
- Music by: T. R. Pappa
- Production company: National Productions
- Distributed by: Subbu & Co
- Release date: 25 February 1956
- Running time: 168 minutes
- Country: India
- Language: Tamil

Raja Rani (transl. The King and Queen) (Note: Also the names of the title characters.) is a 1956 Indian Tamil-language film directed by A. Bhimsingh and written by M. Karunanidhi. The film stars Sivaji Ganesan and Padmini. It was produced by National Productions and released on 25 February 1956.

== Plot ==
Rani is the only daughter of an impoverished, visually challenged man. Babu, a drama company owner, hires her as a box office window ticket vendor. During a play, some gangsters rob Rani of the day's collection, drug her and escape with the booty. The evil-minded Babu who turns up later tries to take advantage of Rani's condition. However, she escapes from him and jumps into a car, falling unconscious in the rear seat.

Raja is the owner of an electrical goods company with a passion for theatre and is the lead player in Babu's drama troupe. Unaware of the turn of events, Raja reaches home. He is surprised to find a girl in the backseat. Then he comes across a news item that a rich man's daughter named Leela has run away from home. He thinks the girl in the car is Leela. Pretending to be Leela, Rani starts acting in the drama troupe. The two fall in love. Raja then launches his own drama company and stages a play about Socrates, playing the title character. Babu tries to wreck the love of Raja and Rani, and so adds real poison to the drink to be given to Raja in the scene that has Socrates drinking poison. How the lovers get united forms the rest of the film.

== Cast ==
Male

- Sivaji Ganesan as Raja
- S. S. Rajendran as Babu
- N. S. Krishnan as Samarasam
- K. Durai Sami as Gnanakannu
- M. N. Krishnan as Current

Female

- Padmini as Rani
- Raja Suclochana as Geetha
- T. A. Mathuram as Shantham
- Angamuthu as Geetha's mother

== Production ==
After the success of Parasakthi (1952), many producers approached M. Karunanidhi to write scripts for them. One of the films he wrote was Raja Rani. Sivaji Ganesan was cast as the lead actor, making this the first of 18 collaborations with director A. Bhimsingh. The film was shot at the now-closed Newtone Studios in Kilpauk. Its owners were Dinshaw K. Tehrani and Jiten Banerjee, who supervised the audiography and cinematography respectively. G. Vittal Rao handled the camera. The dances were choreographed by Hiralal and Sampathkumar. The film also features two plays: one based on Socrates, and another on Cenkuttuvan.

== Soundtrack ==
The music was composed by T. R. Pappa. The songs were well received especially songs like Manippura Pudhu Manippuraa by M. L. Vasanthakumari and Sirippu Idhan Sirappai by N. S. Krishnan & T. A. Madhuram.

Song	Singers	Lyrics	Length (m:ss)
"Vaanga Vaanga...Indriravu Miga Nandriravu"	M. L. Vasanthakumari & S. V. Ponnusamy	M. Karunanidhi	03:30
"Sirippu Idhan Sirappai"	N. S. Krishnan & T. A. Madhuram	A. Maruthakasi	03:12
"Manippuraa Pudhu Manippuraa"	M. L. Vasanthakumari	M. Karunanidhi	02:52
"Kannatra...Poonai Kannai Moodikondaal"	S. C. Krishnan	M. Karunanidhi	03:28
"Kaanadha Inbamellaam Kandidalaam"	Seerkazhi Govindarajan & T. V. Rathnam	Villipuththan	02:44
"Sollaale Veenaanadhe"	Jikki	A. Maruthakasi	03:06
"Aanandha Nilai Peruvom"	T. V. Rathnam & N. L. Ganasaraswathi	M. K. Athmanathan	02:56
"Thirumanam Aagaadha Penne"	T. V. Rathnam	Vivekan	02:46
"Thirai Pottu Naame"	A. M. Rajah & Jikki	A. Maruthakasi	03:07
"Inba Nan Naalidhe"	M. L. Vasanthakumari	M. Karunanidhi	
"Kaadhale Uyiraagi"	A. M. Rajah		01:02

== Release and reception ==
Raja Rani was released on 25 February 1956, and distributed by Subbu & Co. Kanthan of Kalki lauded the performances of Ganesan and Padmini, especially the former's dialogue delivery, and stated that the film was entertaining piece by piece.
