= Gharana (1961 film) =

1961 film

- Theatrical poster
- Directed by: S. S. Vasan
- Written by: Shakeel Badayuni; Mukhram Sharma; M. S. Visvanathan
- Based on: Shanthi Nivasam (Telugu)
- Starring: Raaj Kumar; Rajendra Kumar; Asha Parekh
- Music by: Ravi; Won 'Best Music Director' Filmfare Award for this film in 1961
- Release date: 1961
- Country: India
- Language: Hindi

Gharana (Family) is a 1961 Indian Hindi film that stars Raaj Kumar, Rajendra Kumar and Asha Parekh. It is directed by S. S. Vasan.

This film became a box office hit.

The film was a remake of the 1960 Telugu film Santhi Nivasam and remade in 1988 as Ghar Ghar Ki Kahani.

== Cast ==
- Raaj Kumar as Kailash
- Rajendra Kumar as Kamal
- Asha Parekh as Usha
- Devika as Sita
- Krishna Kumari as Sheela (Usha's step-mother)
- Kanhaiyalal as Advocate Shyam Lal Gupta (Usha's father)
- Bipin Gupta as Rai Bahadur Ramdas
- Lalita Pawar as Shanta
- Shubha Khote as Bhairavi
- Agha as Sarang
- Minoo Mumtaz as Ragini

== Plot ==
The large household at the centre of the plot is run by a tyrannical old mother Shanta. Her husband Ramdas is a very religious, meek man who lets her boss everyone around in the home. The home includes their eldest daughter-in-law Gauri, a widow, raising two little boys. Their middle son is Kailash, who is happily married to a very devoted, loving woman named Sita. Their youngest son is Kamal, a college student, who falls in love with another student Usha. The young married daughter Bhairavi, who was living with her husband and father-in-law, has now moved back home using a trivial reason, such as how she doesn't like her father-in-law's singing. Her husband Sarang has followed her and is staying in the household, trying his best to get his wife to come back to his home. Shanta has completely spoiled her daughter. One day, Bhairavi plants a suspicion in Kailash's head that Sita is having an affair with Kamal. Even after Kamal's marriage to Usha, Kailash's suspicions grow to the point where he leaves his wife and attempts suicide. His friend, a respectable dancer named Ragini, stops him. He accepts her help and later pursues her romantically, but she sees him only as a friend, as he is a married man.

One day, Kamal sees his mother about to hit Usha and stops her. He also convinces his father Ramdas to tame his mother and take control of the household. Ramdas finally does that. He forces Bhairavi to return with Sarang to her in-laws. Meanwhile, when Sita tells Kailash that she is pregnant, he rejects the notion that he is the father, claiming that Kamal fathered the child. Sita vehemently denies these allegations. Heartbroken, she attempts suicide but is stopped by other members of the family. Bhairavi is forced to tell the truth about how she fabricated the story of Kamal having an affair with Sita. Kailash now believes in Sita's fidelity and devotion and begs for her forgiveness. She forgives him, and the entire family is now reunited and happy.

== Songs ==
Ravi scored the music and Shakeel Badayuni wrote songs of the film.

Song	Singer
"Husnwale Tera Jawab Nahin"	Mohammed Rafi
"Jabse Tumhe Dekha Hai, Aankhon Mein Tum Hi Tum Ho"	Asha Bhosle, Mohammed Rafi
"Jai Raghunandan, Jai Siyaram, Hey Dukhbhanjan"	Asha Bhosle, Mohammed Rafi
"Na Dekho Hamen Ghurke, Jadugar Saiyan"	Asha Bhosle, Mohammed Rafi
"Mere Banne Ki Baat Na Poochho, Mera Banna Hariyala Hai"	Asha Bhosle, Shamshad Begum
"Daadi Amma, Daadi Amma, Maan Jao"	Asha Bhosle, Kamal Barot
"Ho Gayi Re Mein Tau Apne Balma Ki Ho Gayi Re"	Asha Bhosle
"Yeh Duniya Usi Ki"	Asha Bhosle
"Yeh Zindagi Ki Uljhanen"	Asha Bhosle

== Awards ==
- Filmfare Best Music Director Award--Ravi in 1961.
- Filmfare Best Lyricist Award — for the song "Husnwale Tera Jawab Nahin" by Shakeel Badayuni in 1961.
- Filmfare Nomination for Best Supporting Actress--Shobha Khote in 1961.
- Filmfare Nomination for Best Playback Singer--Mohammed Rafi for the song "Husnwale Tera Jawab Nahin" in 1961.
