= Oke Kutumbham =

Oke Kutumbam
- Theatrical release poster
- Directed by: A. Bhimsingh
- Written by: Palagummi Padmaraju (dialogues)
- Screenplay by: A. Bheemsingh
- Produced by: Ch. Raghava Rao; K. Basavaiah; Nagabhushanam (presents)
- Starring: N. T. Rama Rao; Lakshmi; Kanta Rao
- Cinematography: G. Vital Rao
- Edited by: A. Pal Dorai Singham
- Music by: S. P. Kodandapani
- Production company: Ravi Art Theatres
- Release date: 25 December 1970
- Running time: 175 minutes
- Country: India
- Language: Telugu

Oke Kutumbam (transl. One Family) is a 1970 Indian Telugu-language drama film, produced by Ch. Raghava Rao and K. Basavaiah, presented by Nagabhushanam and directed by A. Bhimsingh. The film stars N. T. Rama Rao, Lakshmi, Kantha Rao, and has music composed by S. P. Kodandapani. It is a remake of Bhimsingh's Tamil film Paava Mannippu (1961).

== Cast ==
- N. T. Rama Rao as Ramu / Rahim
- Lakshmi as Mary
- Kanta Rao as Chandram
- Nagabhushanam as Marthandam
- V. Nagayya as Ismail
- Dhulipala as Manikhyam
- Allu Ramalingaiah as Kodandam
- Padmanabham as Kavi
- Raja Babu as Vaali Hanumantha Sastry
- Ch Narayana Rao as James
- Ramana Murthy as Foreigner
- Sakshi Ranga Rao
- Rajasree as Seeta
- Jayshree T. as Dancer
- Rukmini as Rajyalakshmi
- Nirmalamma as Rangamma

== Soundtrack ==
Music composed by S. P. Kodandapani.

Song title	Lyrics	Singers	length
"Andaariki Okkade"	Dasaradhi	Ghantasala	4:40
"Votunna Baabullaaraa"	Kosaraju	S. P. Balasubrahmanyam, L. R. Eswari	3:17
"Avune Thaane"	Devulapalli	P. Susheela	4:19
"Manchini Marachi"	Dasaradhi	Ghantasala	4:00
"Kaavali Thidu"	Dasaradhi	S. P. Balasubrahmanyam, P. Susheela	3:47
"Silpaalu Sidhilamaina"	Dasari Narayana Rao	Ghantasala	3:11
"Navvaleka Edvhaanu"	Sri Sri	Ghantasala	4:13
