= Kathal Paduthum Padu =

1966 film directed by Joseph Thaliath Jr

- Theatrical release poster
- Directed by: Joseph Thaliath Jr.
- Story by: Kalaignanam
- Produced by: Dominic Joseph
- Starring: Jaishankar; Vanisri
- Cinematography: B. B. Lucas
- Edited by: M. Vellaichami
- Music by: T. R. Pappa
- Production company: Citadel Studios
- Release date: 7 October 1966
- Running time: 119 minutes
- Country: India
- Language: Tamil

Kathal Paduthum Padu (transl. Strains caused by love) is a 1966 Indian Tamil-language romance film directed by Joseph Thaliath Jr and produced under Citadel Studios. The film stars Jaishankar and Vanisri, the latter's debut in Tamil cinema. It was released on 7 October 1966 and became a commercial success. The film was remade in Telugu as Premalo Pramadam (1967).

== Cast ==
Lead cast

- Jaishankar as Raju
- Vanisri as Suguna

Male supporting cast

- K. A. Thangavelu as Achu
- Moorthy as Vichu
- Suruli Rajan as Ponnambalam

Female supporting cast

- Pandari Bai as Raju's mother
- Vijaya Lalitha as Chandra
- Jayanthi as Maya
- Muthulakshmi as Meenakshi
- Kumari Radha as Lalli
- Sakunthala as Kalarani
- Rajeshwari
- Rama Prabha as Laila
- V. N. Jothi as dancer
- Rajam as dancer

== Production ==
Kathal Paduthum Padu was directed by Joseph Thaliath Jr and produced by Dominic Joseph under the banner of Citadel Studios. The story and dialogues were written by Kalaignanam. This film marked Vanisri's first lead role in Tamil. Gemini Rajeshwari (credited simply as Rajeshwari) was cast after Thaliath was impressed with her performance in the play Kannum Imaiyum. Cinematography was handled by B. B. Lucas, and editing by M. Vellaichami. It marked Vellaichami and S. S. Chandran's first film as an editor and actor, respectively.

== Soundtrack ==
The music was composed by T. R. Pappa.

Track listing
No.	Title	Lyrics	Singer(s)	Length
1.	"Alli Chendathuthe"	Panchu Arunachalam	P. Susheela
2.	"Ivaloru Azhagiya"	Mayavanathan	T. M. Soundararajan, P. Susheela
3.	"Kangalilrandil"	M. K. Athmanathan	P. Susheela, S. Janaki
4.	"Meladai Katrada"	Mayavanathan	P. Susheela
5.	"Velli Nila"	Alangudi Somu	P. Susheela

== Release ==
Kathal Paduthum Padu was released on 7 October 1966, and became a commercial success.

== Bibliography ==
- Rajadhyaksha, Ashish; Willemen, Paul (1998) [1994]. Encyclopaedia of Indian Cinema. British Film Institute and Oxford University Press. ISBN 0-19-563579-5.
