= Santhi Nivasam (1960 film) =

1962 film by C. S. Rao

- Theatrical release poster
- Directed by: C. S. Rao
- Screenplay by: C. S. Rao; Samudrala Jr.
- Based on: Santhi Nivasam by Palagummi Padmaraju
- Produced by: Sundarlal Nahatha; T. Ashwadanarayana
- Starring: Akkineni Nageswara Rao; Rajasulochana; Kantha Rao; Krishna Kumari; Devika
- Cinematography: Kamal Ghosh
- Edited by: N. M. Shankar; C. Hari Rao
- Music by: Ghantasala
- Production company: Sri Productions
- Release date: 14 January 1960
- Running time: 197 minutes
- Country: India
- Language: Telugu

Santhi Nivasam (transl. Abode of peace) is a 1960 Indian Telugu-language drama film directed by C. S. Rao. The film stars Akkineni Nageswara Rao, Rajasulochana, Kantha Rao, Krishna Kumari and Devika. It is an adaptation of Palagummi Padmaraju's Telugu play of the same name, which itself was based on B. S. Ramiah's Tamil play Malliyam Mangalam.

Santhi Nivasam was released on 14 January 1960. The film was a commercial success, running for over 100 days in several theatres. It was remade twice in Hindi as Gharana (1961) and Ghar Ghar Ki Kahani (1988).

== Plot ==
The film centers on a wealthy, conscientious joint family living in a grand house named Santhi Nivasam. The head of the family, Ramadasu, is a reserved man, and his wife, Santhamma, is a domineering figure. They have four children: three sons and a daughter. The eldest son, Ranga, has died, leaving his widow, Rama, and their two young children in the family home. The second son, Raju, frequently travels for work and manages the family's affairs. His wife, Lakshmi, is devoted to him and holds him in high regard. The youngest son, Gopi, is carefree and mischievous. The daughter, Chitti, is prideful and married to Simhalu, whom she refuses to live with due to his father's insanity.

Tensions run high in the household as Santhamma often mistreats her daughters-in-law, incited by Chitti's malicious behavior. Meanwhile, Raju reconnects with his childhood friend, Ragini, and begins spending time with her, which raises suspicions. Gopi, on the other hand, falls in love with Radha, the daughter of Advocate Seetapati Rao, who is tormented by her stepmother, Vimalamma. Gopi confides in Lakshmi, with whom he shares a close bond, about his relationship with Radha.

Chitti schemes to create misunderstandings between Raju and Lakshmi, leading Raju to question their relationship. Unaware of Vimalamma's intentions, Radha and Gopi get married in a playful ceremony. On the night of the wedding, Lakshmi, exhausted due to her pregnancy, is picked up by Gopi, further fueling Raju's suspicions about their relationship. Misled by Chitti, Raju becomes estranged from Lakshmi and begins spending most of his time with Ragini, misunderstanding her sibling-like affection for him.

As the situation deteriorates, Santhamma's cruelty towards her daughters-in-law intensifies, leading Rama to contemplate leaving the household. Gopi, determined to restore peace, confronts his father, Ramadasu, who then reasserts his authority in the household. Santhamma is reprimanded, and Chitti is sent back to live with Simhalu. Lakshmi later gives birth to a baby boy.

The family's troubles escalate when Ramadasu learns of Raju's lavish spending and decides to cut him off financially. Enraged, Raju returns home and accuses Lakshmi of infidelity. Distraught, Lakshmi attempts suicide, but Gopi intervenes and vows to bring Raju back. Gopi confronts Raju at Ragini's house, but Raju, still misled by Chitti, attacks him and wrongfully accuses Lakshmi. Ragini then reveals the true nature of her relationship with Raju, which devastates him.

In the midst of this turmoil, Simhalu uncovers Chitti's deceit, including her theft of a necklace Raju had gifted to Lakshmi. With the truth revealed, Raju realizes his mistakes and is overcome with remorse. Gopi, heartbroken by the family's disarray, contemplates self-sacrifice, but Raju intervenes in time and pleads for forgiveness from Lakshmi. The film concludes with the family reuniting and finding happiness once again.

== Cast ==
- Akkineni Nageswara Rao as Gopi
- Rajasulochana as Radha
- Kantha Rao as Raju
- Krishna Kumari as Ragini
- Devika as Lakshmi
- V. Nagayya as Ramadasu
- Relangi as Narasimhalu
- Ramana Reddy as Captain Paramanandaiah
- K. V. S. Sarma as Seetapati Rao
- Suryakantham as Santamma
- Surabhi Balasaraswathi as Chitti
- Hemalatha as Ramani

== Production ==
=== Development ===
The actors Vallam Narasimha Rao and Padmanabham acquired the Telugu rights of S. V. Sahasranamam's Tamil play Malliyam Mangalam, which was written by B. S. Ramiah, for their first stage production made under the Rekha & Murali Arts banner. The Telugu version, Santhi Nivasam, was written by Palagummi Padmaraju. The play, which starred Padmanabhan and Meenakumari, was an immense success, and caught the attention of producers Sundarlal Nahata, T. Aswathanarayana and director C. S. Rao, who saw "immense potential" in it and bought the film rights. Samudrala Jr. was hired to make changes, such as expanding the story and creating new characters for the film adaptation, which was also titled Santhi Nivasam and was produced under Sri Productions. He also worked as a dialogue writer and lyricist. Cinematography was handled by Kamal Ghosh (with J. Sathyanarayana serving as "operative cameraman"), editing by N. M. Shankar and C. Hari Rao.

=== Casting and filming ===
Akkineni Nageswara Rao was chosen to play Gopi, reprising the role originally played by Padmanabham in the Telugu play. This role was rewritten for the film as the male lead, unlike the play where it was a supporting role. C. S. Rao, who used to enact scenes for his actors, accidentally slipped during one such exercise on the doormat before Ragini's (Krishna Kumari) house set while entering, but immediately managed to balance himself. Kantha Rao, who portrayed Gopi's older brother Raju, believed this was intentional and part of the story, and did exactly the same when filming the scene. After this, C. S. Rao told Kanta Rao, "Any way, it now turned into a symbolic shot for the critics. For the first time you are entering into another woman’s house and the slip represents your fall and the balancing act symbolises your control." Except for two songs which were shot at Brindavan Gardens in Mysore, the rest of the film was completed in one schedule.

== Soundtrack ==
The soundtrack was composed by Ghantasala, and the lyrics were written by Samudrala Ramanujacharya. Many of the songs were adapted from Hindi songs; "Aasalu Theerchave" was based on "Meethi Meethi Baton Se" from Qaidi No. 911, "Chakkanidaana" was based on the title song of Dil Deke Dekho, "Raave Radha Rani Raave" was based on "Jhumta Mausam" from Ujala, and "Come Come" was based on "Tim Tim Tim" from Mausi. "Sri Raghuram", "Kalanaina Nee Valape" and "Ragala Saragala" were original compositions. The song "Sri Raghuram" is based on Hamsadhwani raga.

Track listing
No.	Title	Singer(s)	Length
1.	"Aasalu Theerchave"	Jikki	2:19
2.	"Chakkanidaana"	Pithapuram Nageswara Rao, Swarnalatha	3:13
3.	"Come Come"	Ghantasala, Jikki	3:17
4.	"Kalanaina Nee Valape"	P. Leela	3:42
5.	"Lavokkintayu"	Ghantasala	1:57
6.	"Raave Radha Rani Raave"	Ghantasala, Jikki	3:21
7.	"Ragala Saragala"	Ghantasala, P. Susheela	3:09
8.	"Selayeti Jaalulaga"	P. Leela	6:06
9.	"Sri Raghuram"	P. B. Sreenivas, P. Susheela	3:10
Total length:			30:14

== Release and reception ==
Santhi Nivasam was released on 14 January 1960. The film was a commercial success, running for over 100 days in several theatres. It was remade in Hindi as Gharana (1961), and dubbed in Malayalam as Shantinivas (1962).
