= Qaidi No. 911 =

- Poster
- Directed by: Aspi Irani
- Written by: C. J. Pavri
- Produced by: Aspi Irani
- Starring: Sheikh Mukhtar; Nanda; Mehmood
- Cinematography: Dali Daroowala
- Music by: Dattaram
- Production company: Super Pictures
- Release date: 1959
- Country: India
- Language: Hindi

Qaidi No. 911 (transl. Convict no. 911) is a 1959 Indian Hindi-language crime film produced and directed by Aspi Irani, and written by C. J. Pavri. The film stars Sheikh Mukhtar, Nanda and Mehmood in Lead roles. It focuses on a man who is arrested for a robbery he never committed. The film was remade in Tamil as Kaithi Kannayiram (1960) and in Telugu as Khaidi Kannayya (1962).

== Plot ==
A man is arrested for a robbery he never committed.

== Cast ==
- Sheikh Mukhtar as Birju
- Nanda as Gita
- Mehmood as Anand
- Hiralal as Shambhu
- Jagirdar as the jailor
- Daisy Irani as Guddu

== Production ==
Qaidi No. 911 was produced and directed by Aspi Irani under Super Pictures. The story and screenplay were written by C. J. Pavri, and the dialogue by Akhtar Ul-iman. Cinematography was handled by Dali Daroowala.

== Soundtrack ==
The soundtrack was composed by Dattaram, and the lyrics were written by Hasrat Jaipuri. The song "Mithi Mithi Baton Se Bachna Zara" was later re-used in the Telugu film Santhi Nivasam (1960) as "Aasalu Theerchave". In Qaidi No. 911's Tamil remake Kaithi Kannayiram (1960), the same song was re-used as "Konji Konji Pesi",

No.	Title	Singer(s)	Length
1.	"Tere Tir Ko Humne Pyar Se"	Lata Mangeshkar	3:26
2.	"Mithi Mithi Baton Se Bachna Zara"	Lata Mangeshkar	3:28
3.	"Pyar bhari ye ghataye"	Lata Mangeshkar Manna Dey	4:17

== Reception ==
K. B. Goel, a reviewer for the magazine Thought wrote, "[Sheikh Mukhtar] is strongly built and very tall but seems ill-adjusted in his role" and added, "All this abracadabra could have been a little intelligible had the director Mr Aspi concentrated on the character development rather than dances, which occur at the least provocation, and on enacting the same scene, with slight variations, of the night club. But he chooses what is grist in our films. And that is that." The film was a commercial success.
