= Thai Pirandhal Vazhi Pirakkum =

1958 film by A. K. Velan

- Theatrical release poster
- Directed by: A. K. Velan
- Written by: A. K. Velan
- Produced by: A. K. Velan
- Starring: S. S. Rajendran; M. N. Rajam
- Cinematography: V. Ramamoorthy
- Edited by: V. B. Nadarajan
- Music by: K. V. Mahadevan
- Production company: Arunachalam Pictures
- Distributed by: AVM Productions
- Release date: 14 January 1958
- Country: India
- Language: Tamil

Thai Piranthal Vazhi Pirakkum (transl. The birth of Thai will pave the way for new opportunities) (Note: Thai is a month in the Tamil calendar, and typically falls around January–February of the Gregorian calendar.) is a 1958 Indian Tamil-language satirical drama film, written directed and produced by A. K. Velan in his directorial debut. The film stars S. S. Rajendran and M. N. Rajam, with Prem Nazir, Rajasulochana and V. K. Ramasamy in supporting roles. Released on 14 January 1958, it emerged a major commercial success, and was remade in Telugu as Manchi Manasuku Manchi Rojulu (1958), in Hindi as Barkha (1959), and in Kannada as Rowdy Ranganna (1968).

== Plot ==
Chokkanathan is a greedy and money obsessed man. He dislikes Rangan as he supports farmers. Marudhi is Rangan's sister. Her marriage gets stopped and Rangan goes to jail because of Chokkanathan. The rest of the story is how Rangan achieves his revenge against Chokkanathan.

== Cast ==
- S. S. Rajendran as Rangan
- M. N. Rajam as Saradha
- Prem Nazir as Varadhan
- Rajasulochana as Marudhi
- V. K. Ramasamy as Chokkanathan
- K. N. Kamalam as Meenakshi
- P. S. Venkatachalam as Ekambaram

== Production ==
Thai Piranthal Vazhi Pirakkum was the directorial debut for the Tamil scholar A. K. Velan, who also produced and wrote it. This was Malayalam actor Prem Nazir's debut film in Tamil language. Cinematography was handled by V. Ramamoorthy, and the editing by V. B. Nadarajan.

== Soundtrack ==
Music by K. V. Mahadevan. The slow-paced lullaby "Mannukku Maram Baarama" attained popularity, as did the song "Amudhum Thaenum" (Raga: Mohanakalyani). The title track, written by Maruthakasi, is frequently played on Tamil television and radio channels on every Pongal occasion. "Aasaiyae Alaipolae" was recreated by Thaman S for Kanna Laddu Thinna Aasaiya (2013), with modified lyrics.

Songs	Singers	Lyrics	Length
"Thai Pirantha Vazhi Pirakkum"	T. M. Soundararajan, P. Leela, S. V. Ponnusamy & L. R. Eswari	A. Maruthakasi	04:08
"Sollattuma Sollattuma"	Seerkazhi Govindarajan & K. Jamuna Rani	A. Maruthakasi	03:18
"Nerangketta Nerathile...Nenachathu Onnu"	T. M. Soundararajan	A. Maruthakasi	03:45
"Pollaathor Soozhchi"	Seerkazhi Govindarajan	A. Maruthakasi	
"Eliyorai Thazhthi"	T. M. Soundararajan & R. Balasaraswathi Devi	Ku. Sa. Krishnamoorthi	02:47
"Amudhum Thaenum"	Seerkazhi Govindarajan	Suratha	03:57
"Aasaiyae Alaipolae"	Thiruchi Loganathan	Kannadasan	03:49
"Kalam Sirithu"	K. Jamuna Rani	Kannadasan	03:04
"Mannukku Maram Baarama"	M. S. Rajeswari	K. Muthuswamy	02:59

== Release and reception ==
Thai Piranthal Vazhi Pirakkum was released on 14 January 1958, Pongal day. It was distributed in Madras by AVM Productions. Munuswamy and Manickam jointly reviewed the film for Ananda Vikatan. Munuswamy praised the film for its music and Velan's direction. The film became a commercial success, and was also successful upon rerelease after its first run. Velan built Arunachalam Studio from the profits earned in this film. It also propelled Rajasulochana to stardom. The film was remade in Telugu as Manchi Manasuku Manchi Rojulu (1958) and in Hindi as Barkha (1959).
