= Nirakudam =

- Poster
- Directed by: A. Bhimsingh
- Screenplay by: Surasu
- Story by: M. S. Cholamalai
- Based on: Bhaaga Pirivinai (1959)
- Produced by: Baby
- Starring: Kamal Haasan; Sridevi; Sudheer; Sukumari; Kaviyoor Ponnamma; Adoor Bhasi
- Cinematography: G. Vittal Rao
- Edited by: K. Sankunni
- Music by: Jaya–Vijaya
- Production company: Swapna Films
- Distributed by: Rajashree
- Release date: 29 July 1977
- Country: India
- Language: Malayalam

Nirakudam (transl. The full pot) is a 1977 Indian Malayalam-language film, directed by A. Bhimsingh and produced by Baby. The film stars Kamal Haasan, Sudheer, Sridevi, Sukumari, Kaviyoor Ponnamma and Adoor Bhasi. It is a remake of the director's own Tamil film Bhaaga Pirivinai (1959). The film was released on 29 July 1977 and emerged a commercial success.

== Plot ==
Dharmapalan and his younger brother Satyapalan live together along with their family. Dharmapalan does not have any children, while Satyapalan has two sons. His older son Devan's left leg and hand were paralysed due to an electric shock while he was still a child, while his younger son Rajan is studying in college in the city.

Dharmapalan's wife Bhargavi is jealous of Satyapalan's family and invites her brother's children Prabhakaran and Usha to live with them. Prabhakaran plans and organises Usha's marriage with Rajan. He also creates a rift between the brother's families, ensuring that the families separate. Satyapalan and his wife Sati find it difficult to find a bride for Devan. Santha an orphan maid, volunteers to marry Devan. Eventually Devan and Rajan are blessed with children.

Prabhakaran borrows money from Bhargavi and Rajan to invest in a dance show business in the city with Margarette and her daughter Anarkali. Prabhakaran loses heavily in the dance shows. Rajan had taken money from his office and is under pressure to return the money. In the meanwhile Santha decides to get Devan treated for his handicap and they come to the city.

Bhargavi and Rajan demand that Prabhakaran returns their money. Prabhakaran desperate to make money, snatches Devan's child and tries to organise a circus show involving an elephant and Devan's child. Both Devan and Santha reach the venue. Devan, desperate to save his child from the elephant, comes in contact with a live wire and gets an electric shock. As a result of the shock he recovers and saves his child. Prabhakaran is arrested. The separated families of Dharmapalan and Satyapalan are united and they live together happily.

== Cast ==
- Kamal Haasan as Devan
- Sridevi as Santha
- Sudheer as Rajan
- Adoor Bhasi as Dharmapalan
- Sukumari as Bhargavi
- Nellikode Bhaskaran as Satyapalan
- Kaviyoor Ponnamma as Sathi
- Jose Prakash as Prabhakaran
- Reena as Usha
- Pattom Sadan as Raghavan
- Philomina as Naaniyamma
- Khadeeja as Margarette
- Usharani as Anarkali
- Pala Thankam as Aaya
- Santo Krishnan as Gunda
- K. J. Yesudas as himself

== Production ==
The film was a remake of director A. Bhimsingh's own Tamil film Bhaaga Pirivinai (1959). The film was produced by Baby under the banner of Swapna Films. G. Vittal Rao was the cinematographer and K. Sankunni edited the film. Playwright and actor Surasu wrote script and dialogues for the story written by M. S. Cholamalai. The film was shot at AVM Studio in Madras (now Chennai).

== Soundtrack ==
The music was composed by Jaya–Vijaya and the lyrics were written by Bichu Thirumala. The song "Nakshathradeepangal Thilangi" from this film features K. J. Yesudas singing on stage.

Song	Singers
"Chingavanathaazhathe"	K. J. Yesudas, L. R. Anjali
"Jeevithamennoru"	K. J. Yesudas
"Mannine Pankidunnu"	K. J. Yesudas
"Nakshathra Deepangal"	K. J. Yesudas
"Swarnathinenthinu"	P. Susheela

== Release ==
Nirakudam was released on 29 July 1977. The film was a commercial success, running for over 100 days in theatres.
