= Padithal Mattum Podhuma =

1962 film by A. Bhimsingh

- Theatrical release poster
- Directed by: A. Bhimsingh
- Screenplay by: A. Bhimsingh
- Based on: Naa by Tarasankar Bandyopadhyay
- Produced by: P. Ramakrishnan
- Starring: Sivaji Ganesan; Savitri; Rajasulochana; K. Balaji
- Cinematography: G. Vittal Rao
- Edited by: A. Bhimsingh; A. Paul Duraisingh; R. Thirumalai
- Music by: Viswanathan–Ramamoorthy
- Production company: Ranganathan Pictures
- Distributed by: Sivaji Films
- Release date: 14 April 1962
- Running time: 157 minutes
- Country: India
- Language: Tamil

Padithal Mattum Podhuma (transl. Is education alone enough?) is a 1962 Indian Tamil-language romantic drama film written and directed by A. Bhimsingh. Based on the 1961 novel Naa, by the Bengali writer Tarashankar Bandopadhyay, the film stars Sivaji Ganesan, K. Balaji, Savitri, M. R. Radha and Rajasulochana. It was released on 14 April 1962 and became a commercial success, running for more than 100 days at all centres in Tamil Nadu.

== Plot ==
Raju and Gopal are close cousins raised together by the zamindar and Mangalam. Raju is educated and timid, while Gopal is uneducated and rough. A marriage broker arranges matches: Raju with the wealthy Meena and Gopal with the village girl Seetha. Due to a mix‑up, Raju meets Seetha and falls for her, while Gopal impresses Meena by accident.

Unable to express his wishes, Raju sends anonymous letters defaming himself and Gopal, causing the families to swap the matches. Raju marries Seetha happily, but Gopal’s marriage to Meena turns bitter when she discovers he is uneducated. Misunderstandings grow, and Gopal is wrongly blamed for the defamatory letters.

When the truth almost surfaces, Gopal protects Raju, but tensions escalate. After being humiliated by Meena’s family, Gopal loses control and goes into the forest with a rifle. Raju tries to stop him, and in the struggle the gun accidentally goes off, killing Raju. Before dying, Raju makes Gopal promise not to reveal his guilt about the letter.

Gopal is arrested, but Mangalam later reveals the truth. Seetha testifies that no one knows who pulled the trigger, freeing Gopal. Gopal and Meena reconcile, while Seetha returns to her village.

== Cast ==
- Sivaji Ganesan as Gopal
- Savitri as Seetha
- Rajasulochana as Meena
- K. Balaji as Raju
- R. Muthuraman as Moorthy
- S. V. Ranga Rao as Rao Bahadur
- S. V. Sahasranamam as the zamindar
- P. Kannamba as Mangalam
- M. V. Rajamma as Rao Bahadur's wife
- M. R. Radha as Kailasam
- C. K. Saraswathi as Aandal
- A. Karunanidhi as servant of Rao Bahadur
- Manorama as Kailasam's daughter
- Radhabhai as Moorthy and Seetha's mother
- O. A. K. Thevar as a lawyer (Guest role)
- A. Veerappan (guest appearance in the song "Kaalam Seidha Komalithanatthil")

== Production ==
One song depicting Ganesan's character riding a horse was shot at Raj Bhavan. The song "Pon Ondru Kanden" was initially planned to be shot at a park, but ultimately shot at YMCA Swimming pool.

== Themes ==
The underlying theme of the film is "how a deep friendship between cousins is affected due to both of them being besotted with a woman."

== Soundtrack ==
The music was composed by Viswanathan–Ramamoorthy. The song "Pon Ondru Kanden" is set in the Hindustani raga known as Brindavani Sarang.

Song	Singers	Lyrics	Length
"Annan Kaattiya Vazhiyamma"	T. M. Soundararajan	Kannadasan	03:32
"Kaalam Seidha Komalithanatthil"	P. B. Sreenivas, A. L. Raghavan, G. K. Venkatesh	Kannadasan	03:32
"Naan Kavignanum Illai"	T. M. Soundararajan	Kannadasan	02:52
"Nallavan Enakku"	T. M. Soundararajan, P. B. Sreenivas	Kannadasan	03:20
"Ohohoho Manidhargale"	T. M. Soundararajan	Kannadasan	03:18
"Pon Ondru Kanden"	T. M. Soundararajan, P. B. Sreenivas	Kannadasan	03:13
"Thannilavu Theniraikka"	P. Susheela	Mayavanathan	03:23

== Reception ==
Kanthan of Kalki positively reviewed the film, saying watching it just once was not enough.
