= Saathi (1968 film) =

- Poster
- Directed by: C. V. Sridhar
- Written by: Raj Baldev Raj
- Story by: G. Balasubramaniam Pasumani
- Based on: Palum Pazhamum (1961 film)
- Produced by: S. Krishnamurthy; T. Govindarajan
- Starring: Rajendra Kumar; Vyjayanthimala; Simi Garewal; Pahari Sanyal
- Cinematography: Marcus Bartley
- Edited by: N. M. Shankar
- Music by: Naushad
- Distributed by: Venus Pictures
- Release date: 19 January 1968
- Country: India
- Language: Hindi
- Box office: ₹1,76,00,000

Saathi (transl. Partner) is a 1968 Indian Hindi-language romance film written and directed by C. V. Sridhar. The film stars Rajendra Kumar and Vyjayanthimala, with Simi Garewal, Pahari Sanyal, David Abraham Cheulkar, Veena and Ram Mohan as the ensemble cast while prominent actors such as Shashi Kapoor, Nanda, Sanjeev Kumar, Shabnam, D.K. Sapru and Pratima Devi made guest appearances. The film was produced by S. Krishnamurthy and T. Govindarajan of Venus Pictures. The film's score was composed by Naushad with lyrics provided by Majrooh Sultanpuri. It was edited by N. M. Shankar and filmed by Marcus Bartley.

Saathi is a triangular love story among Ravi, Shanti and Rajni. The film was a remake of the 1961 Tamil film Palum Pazhamum, which was directed by A. Bhimsingh. It was remade in Turkish as Yarım Kalan Saadet (1970) by Türker İnanoğlu.

== Plot ==
Dr. Ravi returns from abroad and takes up a position as chief surgeon in a hospital. He meets with Nurse Shanti, who lives an impoverished lifestyle with her ailing mother, on whom he decides to perform surgery, but she passes away. A guilt-ridden Ravi marries Shanti much to the chagrin of his mentor, Kaka, who had hoped that he would marry his daughter, Rajni.

The couple travel to Jammu and Kashmir for their honeymoon and settle down to a harmonious relationship. Hoping to travel more, their plans are interrupted by the hospital's head doctor, who wants Ravi to focus on cancer research. The couple drops their travel plans and immerses themselves in research so much so that Shanti becomes ill, and not wanting to become a burden, leaves. A frantic Ravi searches high and low in vain and is subsequently devastated to learn that she has perished in a train accident. Kaka then becomes very ill and Kaki tells Ravi that the cause of his illness is Rajni's insistence that she not marry anyone except Ravi. As a result, Ravi marries her but is unable to get Shanti out of his mind. An embittered Rajni feels neglected and decides to confront him, resulting in his losing his vision, perhaps never seeing again, and unable to do any further cancer research.

== Cast ==
- Rajendra Kumar as Ravi
- Vyjayanthimala as Shanti / Sharda
- Simi Garewal as Rajni
- Pahari Sanyal as Rajni's Father
- David Abraham Cheulkar as Head Doctor
- Veena as Rajni's Mother
- Ram Mohan as Ravi's Colleague

Guest appearances include:

- Shashi Kapoor as actor during the filming of Raja Saab
- Nanda as actor during the filming of Raja Saab
- Sanjeev Kumar as Ashok
- Shabnam
- D.K. Sapru as Mr. Philips
- Radhakrishan as Sadhuram
- Pratima Devi as Shanti's Mother

== Soundtrack ==
When Sridhar approached Naushad for composing, he listened to the songs of the original film which was composed by Viswanathan–Ramamoorthy in Tamil. After listening to the songs, Naushad wrote a letter to M. S. Viswanathan saying that he cannot replace the wonderful music which he has composed and he's declining the project. Later, Naushad accepted to compose for the film only on Viswanathan's request. The lyrics were provided by Majrooh Sultanpuri.

Song	Singer	Lyricist	Duration
"Aankhen Khuli Thi"	Mukesh	Majrooh Sultanpuri	04:31
"Bhool Ja"	Mukesh and Mahendra Kapoor	Majrooh Sultanpuri	05:35
"Husne-e-Jaana"	Mukesh	Majrooh Sultanpuri	04:01
"Main To Pyar Se"	Lata Mangeshkar	Majrooh Sultanpuri	03:30
"Mera Pyar Bhi Tu Hai"	Mukesh and Suman Kalyanpur	Majrooh Sultanpuri	04:22
"Mere Jeevan Saathi"	Lata Mangeshkar	Majrooh Sultanpuri	04:02
"Yeh Kaun Aaya"	Lata Mangeshkar	Majrooh Sultanpuri	03:45

== Box office ==
At the end of its theatrical run, the film had grossed around ₹1,76,00,000 and netted ₹88,00,000, thus becoming the eleventh highest-grossing film of 1968 with a verdict of average.

== Awards ==
Won

- Filmfare Award for Best Supporting Actress – Simi Garewal
- Filmfare Award for Best Editing – N. M. Shankar
