= Kanavan Manaivi =

1976 Indian film directed by A. Bhimsingh

- Directed by: A. Bhimsingh
- Screenplay by: A. Bhimsingh
- Story by: Kalaignanam
- Produced by: A. R. Sami
- Starring: R. Muthuraman; Jayalalithaa
- Cinematography: G. Vittal Rao
- Edited by: A. Paul Durai Singam
- Music by: V. Kumar
- Production company: Sree Umachithra Combines
- Release date: 23 January 1976
- Running time: 126 minutes
- Country: India
- Language: Tamil

Kanavan Manaivi (transl. Husband and Wife) is a 1976 Indian Tamil-language film directed by A. Bhimsingh. The film stars R. Muthuraman and Jayalalithaa, with K. A. Thangavelu, Sachu, Srikanth Suruli Rajan and V. S. Raghavan in supporting roles. It was released on 23 January 1976. The film was remade in Telugu as Sita Ramulu (1980) and in Hindi as Haisiyat (1984).

== Plot ==
Chithra, a wealthy girl, falls in love with Shankar, an ordinary man. However, things change when she learns that Shankar is an employee in her company. When Shankar finds the truth he denies her proposal because of their status barrier, but Chitra solves the puzzle by assuring that they will play the dual role as a worker and a proprietor in the factory and at home as a beloved wife and husband.

== Cast ==
- R. Muthuraman as Shankar
- Jayalalithaa as Chithra
- Srikanth as Ravi
- K. A. Thangavelu as Ravi's father
- V. S. Raghavan as Inspector Ramadurai
- Suruli Rajan as Gopal
- Sachu as Usha
- Sukumari as Ranganayaki
- Usilai Mani as Gopal

== Soundtrack ==
Th music was composed by V. Kumar with lyrics by Kannadasan and Vaali.

Track listing
No.	Title	Singer(s)	Length
1.	"Raja Vanthaa Road"	T. M. Soundararajan	03:34
2.	"Malaigalil Megangal Ragangal"	P. Susheela, T. M. Soundararajan	03:48
3.	"Sorgam Thaan Sugam Tharum"	P. Susheela	04:04
4.	"Vazhga Kaigal Irandum"	S. P. Balasubrahmanyam	04:14
Total length:			15:40

== Reception ==
Kanthan of Kalki praised Bhimsingh's direction and writing, Muthuraman's performance and Srikanth's villainy.
