= Aai Phirse Bahar =

1960 Indian Hindi film

- Poster
- Directed by: A. Bhimsingh
- Based on: Raja Rani (1956) Tamil Language Film
- Starring: Padmini; Sivaji Ganesan; Rajasulochana; Ragini
- Music by: Vedpal Sharma
- Release date: 1960
- Country: India
- Language: Hindi

Aai Phirse Bahar (transl. The Flowers Have Blossomed Again) is a 1960 Indian Hindi-language film which was directed by A. Bhimsingh and starred by Padmini and Sivaji Ganesan as the leading characters.

== Plot ==
The film revolves around Rani (Padmini) who became widow at a very young age. During the 1950s, widowed women were by tradition not allowed to wear ornaments and lead a normal life; Rani was of no exception.
