= Paadhukaappu =

- Poster
- Directed by: A. Bhimsingh
- Screenplay by: A. Bhimsingh
- Story by: S. L. Puram Sadanandam
- Produced by: A. Bhimsingh
- Starring: Sivaji Ganesan; Jayalalithaa
- Cinematography: G. Vittal Rao
- Edited by: A. Paul Duraisingam
- Music by: M. S. Viswanathan
- Production company: Sun Beam Productions
- Release date: 27 November 1970
- Country: India
- Language: Tamil

Paadhukaappu (transl. Protection) is a 1970 Indian Tamil-language drama film, directed and produced by A. Bhimsingh. The film stars Sivaji Ganesan, Jayalalithaa, T. S. Balaiah and Major Sundarrajan. It was released on 27 November 1970.

== Cast ==
- Sivaji Ganesan as Kanthan
- Jayalalithaa as Valli "Vatchu"
- Sowcar Janaki as Kamakshi
- Major Sundarrajan as Vaiyapuri
- M. N. Nambiar as Vinayagam
- S. V. Subbaiah as Snake Charmer
- T. S. Balaiah as Chinnathambi
- J. P. Chandrababu as Chandran
- Nagesh as Krishnasamy Iyer "Kichami"
- Thengai Srinivasan as Natarajan "Walk King"
- A. Karunanidhi as Machi
- Senthamarai as Kalyanasundaram
- Saraswathi as Kalyanasundarm Wife
- K. R. Indira Devi as Parvathi
- C. T. Rajakantham as Chinthamani
- Karikol Raju as Small Role
- A. K. Veerasamy as Iyer
- Usilai Mani as Iyer
- Baby Kumuthini as Young Valli
- Senji Krishnan as Chandran Drama Group

== Production ==
Paadhukaappu was the final of a famed collaboration between Bheemsingh and Ganesan.

== Soundtrack ==
The music was composed by M. S. Viswanathan, with lyrics by Kannadasan.

Song	Singers
"Muthunagai Nagamma"	P. Susheela
"Oru Naal Ninaitha Kariyam"	T. M. Soundararajan
"Nammalki Pyari"	J. P. Chandrababu, L. R. Eswari
"Kalam Kadanthum"	Sirkazhi Govindarajan
"Vara Solladi"	P. Susheela
"Naan Konjam Over"	L. R. Eswari

== Reception ==
The Indian Express called the plot "intriguing", but panned the direction and felt Ganesan was underutilised. The film, unlike Bheemsingh and Ganesan's previous collaborations, was a failure.
