= Rajasulochana =

Indian classical dancer, actress (1935–2013)

- Born: Pilliarchetty Rajeevalochana; 15 August 1935; Bezawada, Madras Presidency
- Died: 5 March 2013 (aged 77); Chennai
- Occupations: Classical dancer; actress
- Years active: 1950s to 1970s
- Spouse: C. S. Rao

Chittajallu Rajeevalochana (15 August 1935 – 5 March 2013), better known as Rajasulochana, was an Indian classical dancer and actress. She acted in more than 300 Telugu, Tamil, Kannada, Malayalam and Hindi language films.

== Early life ==
She was born on 15 August 1935 in Bezawada (now Vijayawada), in Andhra Pradesh. Her father, Pilliarchetty Bhakthavatsalam Naidu, worked in Indian Railways and was transferred to Madras as PA to the General Manager of M&SM Railway. At school, her name was erroneously recorded as Rajasulochana.

== Career ==
She learned Indian classical dance from Lalithamma, K. N. Dhandayuthapani Pillai, Acharyulu and Vempati Chinna Satyam, Krishnakumar, Vishnu Vysarkar, and Kalamandalam Madhavan.

The Kannada stage and screen maestro H. L. N. Simha gave her an acting opportunity in Gunasagari (Kannada, 1953), produced by Gubbi Veeranna. Subsequently, she acted in about 274 films in all South Indian languages. She acted with all the leading stars of South Indian cinema such as M. G. Ramachandran, Sivaji Ganesan, N. T. Rama Rao, Akkineni Nageswara Rao, Rajkumar, S. S. Rajendran, Prem Nazir, A. P. Nagarajan and M. N. Nambiar.

=== Pushpanjali Nritya Kala Kendram ===
She founded the dance school "Pushpanjali Nritya Kala Kendram" in 1961 in Chennai. It has trained many students in Indian classical dance forms and celebrated its Silver Jubilee in 1986. She gave many dance performances in India and abroad and got critical acclaim for the dance dramas.

== Personal life ==
She had a son out of her first marriage and after it ended in a divorce, she married actor-director C. S. Rao and had twin daughters. One daughter lives in Chennai. The other twin daughter and son live in Chicago, Illinois.

== Death ==
Rajasulochana died in Chennai on 5 March 2013 at the age of 77. Condoling her death, Tamil Nadu Chief Minister Jayalalithaa said the actress had left an imprint for herself in the film industry. She was engaged in creating artistes in her dance school "Pushpanjali Nrithya Kala Kendram" here, Jayalalithaa said.

== Partial filmography ==
Year	Title	Role	Language	Notes
1953	Gunasagari		Kannada	Debut film
1953	Kanna Talli		Telugu	Guest role
1954	Antha Manavalle		Telugu	
1954	Mangalyam		Tamil	
1954	Bedara Kannappa		Kannada	
1954	Sri Kalahastiswara Mahatyam	Chintamani	Telugu	
1954	Manasakshi	Lakshmi Panickar	Malayalam	
1955	Gulebakavali		Tamil	
1955	Sri Krishna Thulabaram		Telugu	
1955	Cherapakura Chedevu	Menaka	Telugu	
1955	Gandarva Kanya		Kannada	
1955	Santosham		Telugu	
1955	Pennarasi		Tamil	
1955	Nallavan		Tamil	
1955	Ellam Inba Mayam		Tamil	
1955	Mahakavi Kalidasa		Kannada	
1956	Paditha Penn		Tamil	
1956	Aasai		Tamil	
1956	Harishchandra		Kannada	
1956	Chori Chori	Bhagwan's wife	Hindi	
1956	Vazhvile Oru Naal	Lakshmi	Tamil	
1956	Marma Veeran		Tamil	
1956	Penki Pellam		Telugu	
1956	Rangoon Radha	Radha	Tamil	
1956	Gulebhagavali	Nagmatha	Kannada	
1956	Sontha Ooru		Telugu	
1956	Raja Rani		Tamil	
1957	Alladdin Ka Chirag		Hindi	
1957	Allauddin Adhbhuta Deepam	Sitara (dancer)	Telugu	
1957	Allavudeenum Arputha Vilakkum		Tamil	
1957	Manaalane Mangaiyin Baakkiyam		Tamil	
1957	Repu Needhe		Telugu	
1957	Sankalpam	Bhama	Telugu	
1957	Ambikapathy	Kannamma	Tamil	
1957	Sarangadhara		Telugu	
1957	Rani Lalithangi		Tamil	
1957	Suvarna Sundari	Jayanthi	Telugu	
1957	Swayamprabha		Telugu	
1957	Todi Kodallu	Navaneetham	Telugu	
1957	Vanangamudi	Ambige	Tamil	
1957	Pathini Deivam		Tamil	
1958	Sitaron Se Aage		Hindi	
1958	Piya Milan		Hindi	
1958	Anna Thammudu		Telugu	
1958	Thai Pirandhal Vazhi Pirakkum		Tamil	
1958	Pelli Naati Pramanalu	Radha Rani	Telugu	
1958	Aada Pettanam		Telugu	
1958	Avan Amaran		Tamil	
1958	Sobha		Telugu	
1958	Kanniyin Sabatham		Tamil	
1958	Bhooloka Rambai		Tamil	
1958	Bhooloka Rambha		Tamil	
1958	Manchi Manasuku Manchi Rojulu		Telugu	
1958	Inti Guttu		Telugu	
1958	Sarangadhara		Tamil	
1958	Thedi Vandha Selvam		Tamil	
1958	Kathavarayan		Tamil	
1959	C.I.D. Girl		Hindi	
1959	Jayabheri	Narthaki Amrutha	Telugu	
1959	Raja Makutam	Prameela	Telugu	
1959	Raja Malaya Simha		Telugu	
1959	Pudhumai Penn		Tamil	
1959	Bhagya Devathai		Tamil	
1959	Arumai Magal Abirami		Tamil	
1959	Sahodhari		Tamil	
1959	Mangalya Balam		Telugu	
1959	Pandithevan		Tamil	
1959	Bala Nagamma		Telugu	
1959	Bhagya Devatha		Telugu	
1959	Kalaivaanan		Tamil	
1959	Sollu Thambi Sollu		Tamil	
1959	Vaazhkai Oppandham		Tamil	
1959	Thaai Magalukku Kattiya Thaali	Kaveri	Tamil	
1960	Aai Phirse Bahar		Hindi	
1960	Mohabbat Ki Jeet		Hindi	
1960	Raja Makutam		Telugu	
1960	Mahakavi Kalidasu		Telugu	
1960	Kaithi Kannayiram		Tamil	
1960	Kavalai Illaadha Manithan		Tamil	
1960	Ponni Thirunaal		Tamil	
1960	Sangilithevan		Tamil	
1960	Samajam		Telugu	
1960	Shanthi Nivasam		Telugu	
1961	Arasilangumari	Azhagurani	Tamil	
1961	Nallavan Vazhvan		Tamil	
1961	Velugu Needalu		Telugu	
1961	Rushyasrunga		Kannada	
1961	Bikari Ramudu		Telugu	
1961	Iddaru Mitrulu	Sarala	Telugu	
1961	Sabhash Raja		Telugu	
1962	Chitti Tammudu		Telugu	
1962	Appaginthalu		Telugu	
1962	Kavitha		Telugu	
1962	Khaidi Kannayya		Telugu	
1962	Tiger Ramudu		Telugu	
1962	Padandi Munduku		Telugu	
1962	Padithal Mattum Podhuma		Tamil	
1963	Sri Tirupatamma Katha		Telugu	
1963	Valmiki		Telugu	
1963	Parisu		Tamil	
1963	Valmiki		Kannada	
1963	Aapta Mitrulu		Telugu	
1964	Babruvahana	Uloochi	Telugu	
1965	Pandava Vanavasam	Dancer	Telugu	
1966	Parakkum Pavai		Tamil	
1967	Konte Pilla		Telugu	
1968	En Thambi	Dancer	Tamil	
1968	Thirumal Perumai	Dancer	Tamil	
1968	Pedarasi Peddamma Katha		Telugu	
1969	Ekaveera		Telugu	
1972	Hanthakulu Devanthakulu	Sukumari	Telugu	
1972	Tata Manavadu	Geeta	Telugu	
1972	Jaga Mecchida Maga		Kannada	
1972	Ustad Mera Naam		Hindi	
1973	Bharatha Vilas	Sameera (Ibrahim's wife)	Tamil	
1973	Desoddharakulu		Telugu	
1973	Devudamma	Sheela	Telugu	
1973	Srivaru Maavaru	Radhika	Telugu	
1974	Chakravakam		Telugu	
1974	Naan Avanillai		Tamil	
1975	Idhayakkani		Tamil	
1975	Bharatamlo Oka Ammayi		Telugu	
1976	Thunive Thunai	Head of Smugglers	Tamil	
1976	Punardatta		Telugu	
1976	Appooppan		Malayalam	
1977	Palabishegham	Sengamalam	Telugu	
1977	Gaayathri		Tamil	
1977	Sila Nerangalil Sila Manithargal	Padma	Tamil	
1978	Karunamayudu		Telugu	
1978	Shri Kanchi Kamakshi		Tamil	
1980	Mahalakshmi	Kantham	Telugu	
1980	Bebbuli	Jagannatham's moll	Telugu	
1981	Jeevakke Jeeva		Kannada	
1981	Srivari Muchatlu		Telugu	
1982	Ilanjodigal	Sivagami Nachiyar	Tamil	
1982	Oorige Upakari		Kannada	
1983	Ramudu Kadu Krishnudu		Telugu	
1983	Manaivi Solle Manthiram		Tamil	
1984	Ambigai Neril Vanthaal		Tamil	
1985	Mayaladi	Yashoda	Telugu	
1986	Aadi Dampatulu		Telugu	
1987	Viswanatha Nayakudu	Damayanthi (Kalavati's mother)	Telugu	
1987	Kudumbam Oru Kovil		Tamil	
1988	Kaliyuga Karnudu	Durgamma	Telugu	
1990	Chinna Kodalu	Wife of Dr. Prabhakar Reddy	Telugu	
1990	Irugillu Porigillu		Telugu	
1995	Thodi Kodallu	Mother of Jayasudha and Malasri	Telugu	
