= Bhaaga Pirivinai =

1959 film

- Theatrical release poster
- Directed by: A. Bhimsingh
- Screenplay by: A. Bhimsingh
- Story by: M. S. Solaimalai
- Produced by: G. N. Velumani
- Starring: Sivaji Ganesan; B. Saroja Devi
- Cinematography: G. Vittal Rao
- Edited by: A. Bhimsingh
- Music by: Viswanathan–Ramamoorthy
- Production company: Saravana Films
- Distributed by: Sivaji Productions
- Release date: 31 October 1959
- Running time: 155 minutes
- Country: India
- Language: Tamil

Bhaaga Pirivinai (transl. The Partition) is a 1959 Indian Tamil-language drama film directed by A. Bhimsingh, starring Sivaji Ganesan, M. R. Radha and B. Saroja Devi. The film was released on 31 October 1959. It was remade in Hindi as Khandan (1965), in Telugu as Kalasi Vunte Kaladu Sukham (1961), in Kannada as Muriyada Mane (1964) and in Malayalam as Nirakudam (1977).

== Plot ==
Vaidyalingam and Sundaralingam are brothers devoted to each other and married to Akilandam and Meenakshi respectively. While Vaidyalingam has no children of his own, Sundaralingam has Kannaiyan and Mani. While Kannaiyan had lost the use of his left hand due to an accident turns out to be uneducated; Mani turns out to be healthy, well-educated and almost the surrogate son of Akilandam, who hates the rest of Sundaralingam's family.

Enter Singapore Singaram, Akilandam's brother who is corrupt, cunning, evil, money-minded. He manipulates the situation such that Sundaralingam and Vaidyalingam are forced to partition their property (something considered the ultimate failure of joint families) while Kannaiyan and Mani are forced to separate as Mani is now married to Amudha, Singaram's daughter. Kannaiyan is married to Ponni. Singaram swindles off all the money from Akilandam and gets Mani into trouble in his office by stealing the company money.

In the end, Kannaiyan who comes to city to get treatment, accidentally gets electric shock and gets back the use of his hand, thrashes Singaram and reunites the family.

== Cast ==
- Sivaji Ganesan as Kannaiyan
- B. Sarojadevi as Ponni
- M. N. Nambiar as Mani (Kannaiyan's brother)
- M. R. Radha as Singapor Singaram
- T. S. Balaiah as Vaithiyalingam Moopanar
- S. V. Subbaiah as Sundaralingam Moopanar (Kannaiyan's father)
- M. V. Rajamma as Meenakshi (Kannaiyan's mother)
- C. K. Saraswathi as Akilandam (Vaithiyalingam's wife, Singarm's sister)
- N. Lalitha as Amutha (Mani Lover)
- K. M. Nambirajan
- S. Ramarao
- C. T. Rajakantham as Jaaldra Devi
- Padmini Priyadarshini as Annarkali

== Production ==
The film was produced by G. N. Velumani from Gobichettipalayam, who began life as a costume maker before rising to become a top Tamil producer. The film was shot at Neptune Studio (later Sathya Studio) in Adyar. G. Vittal Rao was the man behind the camera and Bhim Singh himself edited the film. Hari Babu and Gajapathi were in charge of make-up, while G. S. Mani, a musicologist, assisted in composing the music. The dances were choreographed by Madhavan, Chinnilal and Sampath. It was the first film to be shot in Gobichettipalayam.

== Soundtrack ==
The music was composed by Viswanathan–Ramamoorthy. Lyrics were by Kannadasan, A. Maruthakasi and Pattukkottai Kalyanasundaram. Viswanathan–Ramamoorthy used only three instruments for the song "Thazhayam Poo Mudichi". For the song "En Piranthai Magane", Kalyanasundaram was originally approached to write lyrics; however he was not comfortable writing lyrics for a lullaby so he insisted the producer choose Kannadasan to write the lyrics. Kannadasan had a misunderstanding with Ganesan after Naane Raja and did not write any songs for him. When producer asked Ganesan to have Kannadasan as the lyricist, he duly agreed.

| Song | Singers | Lyrics | Length (m:ss) |
|---|---|---|---|
| "Aanai Mugatthone...Pillaiyaaru Koyilukku" | T. M. Soundararajan & P. Leela | Pattukkottai Kalyanasundaram | 04:24 |
| "Aattatthile Palavagai Undu" | A. L. Raghavan & K. Jamuna Rani | Pattukkottai Kalyanasundaram | 03:18 |
| "Otrumaiyaai Vaazhvadhaale Undu Nanmaiye" | Seerkazhi Govindarajan & L. R. Eswari | A. Maruthakasi | 03:35 |
| "Paalootri Uzhavu...Therodum Indha Seeraana" | T. M. Soundararajan & P. Leela | Kannadasan | 06:52 |
| "Thangatthile Oru Kurai Irundhaalum" | P. Susheela | Kannadasan | 03:31 |
| "Thalaiyaam Poo Mudichu" | T. M. Soundararajan & P. Leela | Kannadasan | 06:00 |
| "En Piranthaai Magane" | T. M. Soundararajan | Kannadasan | 03:24 |

== Reception ==
The Tamil magazine Ananda Vikatan appreciated the film stating "Sivaji's acting was fantastic in the role and the film totally fulfilled the expectations of everyone". At the 7th National Film Awards, the film won the President's silver medal for Best Feature Film in Tamil.

== Remakes ==
The film was remade in Hindi as Khandan (1965), in Telugu as Kalasi Vunte Kaladu Sukham (1961), in Kannada as Muriyada Mane (1964) and in Malayalam as Nirakudam (1977).

== Bibliography ==
- Dhananjayan, G. (2014). Pride of Tamil Cinema: 1931–2013. Blue Ocean Publishers. OCLC 898765509.
