= Haisiyat =

1984 Indian film directed by Dasari Narayana Rao

- Theatrical release poster
- Directed by: Dasari Narayana Rao
- Written by: Kader Khan (dialogues)
- Screenplay by: Dasari Narayana Rao
- Story by: Dasari Narayana Rao
- Based on: Kanavan Manaivi
- Produced by: Srikanth Nahata
- Starring: Jeetendra; Jaya Prada
- Cinematography: S.V. Srikanth
- Edited by: D. Venkataratnam
- Music by: Bappi Lahiri
- Production company: Vijayalakshmi Pictures
- Release date: 10 August 1984
- Running time: 145 minutes
- Country: India
- Language: Hindi

Haisiyat (transl. Status) is a 1984 Hindi-language drama film, produced by Srikanth Nahata under the Vijayalakshmi Pictures banner and directed by Dasari Narayana Rao. It stars Jeetendra, Jaya Prada in the pivotal roles and music composed by Bappi Lahari. The film is remake of Tamil movie Kanavan Manaivi(1976) again remakes in 1980 as "Sita Ramulu"in Telugu. It is (

== Plot ==
Ram (Jeetendra) is a hardworking factory worker and the union leader. He strives to get a good deal for the workers from management. When he demands bonus for all workers the factory manager Ravi (Shakti Kapoor) creates every possible hurdle to not pay. The workers decide to go on strike. Ram asks them to wait for the return of the new factory owner Sita (Jaya Prada) back from America. However Ravi influences Sita to go against the workers and she refuses to meet with the workers.

Ram is a good singer. Sita is attracted by his voice and they soon fall in love with each other. Sita is unaware that Ram is worker in her own factory. On finding out the truth Sita proposes marriage. Ram is reluctant to accept due to the huge difference in their status. Sita assures him that he would continue to work as the union leader in the factory and she serve him at home. They get married.

Sita is elected as President of the Chamber of Commerce. When she rejects the workers' bonus demands intense conflict erupts. Ram as union leader has no choice to take a hard stance for the welfare of the workers. He goes on hunger strike. The workers kill a businessman in the Chamber of Commerce. Sita closes the factory permanently. Ram takes the case to court. The court decides in favour of the workers. Sita takes this as personal humiliation and leaves Ram's house. She wants to take revenge on the workers.Ravi kidnaps her and wants to kill her. Ram and the factory workers come to her rescue. Ram and Sita finally reunite.

== Cast ==
- Jeetendra as Ram
- Jaya Prada as Sita
- Pran
- Kader Khan
- Shakti Kapoor as Ravi
- Satyendra Kapoor
- Rohini Hattangadi
- Jayshree T.
- Raza Murad
- Bhushan Tiwari
- Viju Khote
- Anuradha as item number

== Soundtrack ==
The soundtrack was composed by Bappi Lahiri. All songs were penned by Indeevar except "Jaagi Jaagi Re Jaagi" (Farooq Kaiser).

Song	Singer
"Jaagi Jaagi Re Jaagi"	Kishore Kumar, Lata Mangeshkar
"Uttar Mein Dekhoon To Surat Teri, Dakshin Mein Dekhoon To Surat Teri"	Kishore Kumar, Asha Bhosle
"Daftar Ko Der Ho Gayi, Mujhe Jaldi Se Coffee Pilana"	Kishore Kumar, Asha Bhosle
"One Rupee Ten Rupees"	Usha Mangeshkar, Shailendra Singh, Chandrani Mukherjee
"Dheere Dheere Subah Huyi"	K. J. Yesudas
"Dheere Dheere Subah Huyi"	K. J. Yesudas, Vani Jairam
