= Kaithi Kannayiram =

1960 film by A. S. A. Sami

- Poster
- Directed by: A. S. A. Sami
- Based on: Qaidi No. 911
- Produced by: T. R. Sundaram
- Starring: R. S. Manohar; Rajasulochana; P. S. Veerappa; Javar Seetharaman; K. A. Thangavelu
- Cinematography: C. A. S. Mani; S. S. Lal
- Music by: K. V. Mahadevan
- Production company: Modern Theatres
- Release date: 1 December 1960
- Country: India
- Language: Tamil

Kaithi Kannayiram (transl. Prisoner Kannayiram) is a 1960 Indian Tamil-language crime film, written and directed by A. S. A. Sami. Produced by T. R. Sundaram of Modern Theatres, the film stars R. S. Manohar and Rajasulochana. A remake of the 1959 Hindi film Qaidi No. 911, it revolves around a man who is arrested for a robbery he never committed. The film was released on 1 December 1960 and became a commercial success.

== Plot ==
A jailor's son named Kumaran is kidnapped by a vengeful murderous prisoner. Another prisoner who has lost his child escapes from the prison. He takes up the task of rescuing the jailor's missing son. The duty-conscious jailor is only keen on apprehending him. The child is taught music by a teacher and the song, "Konji Konji Pesi", becomes the link to the rescue of the child kept prisoner in a building. Unable to locate the child who is held captive, the music teacher goes around the town singing the song. On hearing the song, the child emerges from his hideout and utters the lines outwitting the guards. The child is rescued after a long fight between the two prisoners.

== Cast ==
- R. S. Manohar as Kannayiram
- P. S. Veerappa as Jagatheeran
- Rajasulochana as Pattammal
- K. A. Thangavelu as Singaram
- E. V. Saroja as Madhavi
- Seetharaman as the jailor
- Master Sridhar as Ravi
- Baby Savithri as Kumaran
- Kallapart Natarajan as Inspector Anand
- ‘Socrates' Thangaraj
- 'Kambar' Jayaraman as Sethu
- 'Periyar' Rajavelu [Rajavelan]
- Vasantha as Hema

== Soundtrack ==
The soundtrack album was composed by K. V. Mahadevan. The lyrics were written by A. Maruthakasi. The song "Konji Konji Pesi" is based on "Meethi Meethi Baaton Se" from the Hindi original.

Track listing
No.	Title	Singer(s)	Length
1.	"Konji Konji Pesi" (Happy)	P. Susheela	03:58
2.	"Sundelikkum"	M. S. Rajeswari	02:58
3.	"Maanam Nenjile"	K. Jamuna Rani	03:05
4.	"En Kannai Konjam"	K. Jamuna Rani	05:17
5.	"Kaadhalai Sodhichu"	Sirkazhi Govindarajan, K. Jamuna Rani	03:58
6.	"Saala Mishtri"	Sirkazhi Govindarajan	03:18
7.	"Sangadam"	Sirkazhi Govindarajan	02:55
8.	"Konji Konji Pesi" (Pathos)	P. Susheela and Chorus	03:54
Total length:			29:23

== Release and reception ==
Kaithi Kannayiram was released on 1 December 1960, and fared well at the box office.
