= Manchi Manasuku Manchi Rojulu =

- Theatrical release poster
- Directed by: C. S. Rao
- Written by: Samudrala Jr (dialogues)
- Screenplay by: C. S. Rao
- Story by: A. K. Velan
- Based on: Thai Pirandhal Vazhi Pirakkum by A. K. Velan
- Produced by: Sundarlal Nahatha; T. Ashwadanarayana
- Starring: N. T. Rama Rao; Rajasulochana
- Cinematography: Kamal Ghosh
- Edited by: A. K. Gopal; C. Hari Rao
- Music by: Ghantasala
- Production company: Sri Productions
- Release date: 15 August 1958
- Running time: 168 minutes
- Country: India
- Language: Telugu

Manchi Manasuku Manchi Rojulu (transl. Good Days for Good People) is 1958 Indian Telugu-language drama film, produced by Sundarlal Nahatha, T. Ashwadanarayana under the Sri Productions banner and directed by C. S. Rao. The film stars N. T. Rama Rao, Rajasulochana with music composed by Ghantasala. It is a remake of the Tamil film Thai Pirandhal Vazhi Pirakkum (1958).

== Cast ==
- N. T. Rama Rao as Raju
- Rajasulochana as Janaki
- Rajanala as Chinna Puli
- Relangi as Venkatappaiah
- Allu Ramalingaiah as Kethana
- Ramana Murthy as Dr. Raghu
- Peketi Sivaram as Compounder
- K.V.S.Sarma as Goppala Ganapathi
- Suryakantham as Kantham
- Girija as Lawyer Rani
- M. Jayashree
- Vasundara Devi

== Soundtrack ==
Music composed by Ghantasala.

S. No.	Song title	Lyrics	Singers	length
1	"Manchi Manasu"	Kosaraju	Madhavapeddi Satyam, P. Susheela	5:58
2	"Vinavamma Vinavamma"	Samudrala Jr	Ghantasala, P. Susheela	2:48
3	"Kalavari Swardham"	Kosaraju	Ghantasala, P. Susheela	3:09
4	"Raave Naa Chelaya"	Samudrala Jr.	Ghantasala, P. Susheela	3:50
5	"Bharatha Naari"	Samudrala Jr	Ghantasala	3:13
6	"Hailo Hailessa"	Samudrala Jr.	Ghantasala	2:36
7	"Dharaniki Giri Bharama"	Samudrala Jr.	R. Balasaraswathi Devi	2:54
8	"O Chinni Bala"	Samudrala Jr.	Jikki	3:43
9	"Anukunnadokkati"	Kosaraju	Ghantasala	3:35

== Reception ==
The film has celebrated Silver Jubilee and ran for 152 days in Vijayawada.
