= Palum Pazhamum =

1961 film by A. Bhimsingh

- Theatrical release poster
- Directed by: A. Bhimsingh
- Screenplay by: A. Bhimsingh
- Story by: G. Balasubramaniam; Pasumani
- Produced by: G. N. Velumani
- Starring: Sivaji Ganesan; B. Saroja Devi
- Cinematography: G. Vittal Rao
- Edited by: A. Bhimsingh; A. Paul Duraisingh; R. Thirumalai
- Music by: Viswanathan–Ramamoorthy
- Production company: Saravana Films
- Distributed by: Sivaji Films
- Release date: 9 September 1961
- Running time: 184 minutes
- Country: India
- Language: Tamil

Palum Pazhamum (pronounced [paːlɯm paɻamɯm] transl. Milk and Fruit) is a 1961 Indian Tamil-language film directed by A. Bhimsingh. The film stars Sivaji Ganesan and B. Saroja Devi. It was released on 9 September 1961. The film was remade in Kannada as Beratha Jeeva, and in Hindi as Saathi, the latter was remade in Turkish as Yarım Kalan Saadet (1970).

== Plot ==
Ravi is a doctor searching for a cancer cure. Shanthi is Ravi's nurse who assists him in his research. Ravi offers to marry her after her father's death. After putting in enormous efforts, Ravi emerges successful in formulating a new drug but Shanthi is diagnosed with tuberculosis. Ravi begins to neglect his duties as a doctor, focusing on Shanthi's health. Shanthi flees on a train as she does not wish to divert him from his research.

The train crashes and Shanthi is believed to be dead. Ravi is heartbroken but vows to complete his research. Ravi's family forces him to marry Nalini, but they do not have a happy home life, as he is more oriented towards his research than his family. Nalini and Ravi fight, and in one of these fights Ravi loses his eyesight. Meanwhile, Shanthi escapes the train crash and goes to Switzerland to cure her tuberculosis. Shanthi returns from Switzerland to find that her husband has lost his eyesight. She offers to nurse Ravi; Ravi finds her voice familiar but does not recognise her, and confides in her that he is still fond of his ex-wife. Nalini overhears this, and complains to her parents. Shanthi faces criticism from the womenfolk of the house for her intimacy with Ravi.

Ravi's brother Sekar grows fond of Shanthi and tells Ravi so. Ravi suggests they marry. Shanthi is upset and reveals her identity to Ravi's family. Ravi's sight is restored by an operation. He recognises Shanti and rushes to the marriage hall to find that Shanthi's sister is married to his brother. Ravi reunites with Shanti while Nalini joins the Red Cross and flies to Switzerland. The movie ends with Ravi and Shanthi working together to benefit mankind.

== Cast ==
- Sivaji Ganesan as Dr. Ravi
- B. Saroja Devi as Shanthi & Neela
- Sowcar Janaki as Nalini
- M. R. Radha as Mama
- T. S. Balaiah as Chinnavar
- S. V. Subbaiah as Periyavar
- M. S. Sundari Bai as Gomathi
- A. Karunanidhi as Sanjeevi
- Manorama as Mayilvahanam
- C. T. Rajakantham as Maruthayee
- K. Sairam as Devangu
- S. A. Kannan as Shanthi's uncle
- T. Thangaraj
- V. Nagayya as Doctor (Guest appearance)
- Prem Nazir as Sekar
- K. D. Santhanam as Bai

== Production ==
The song "Thendral Varum" which was picturised on Sowcar Janaki was removed from the film due to length issues.

== Soundtrack ==
The music was composed by Viswanathan–Ramamoorthy (a duo consisting of M. S. Viswanathan and T. K. Ramamoorthy) with lyrics by Kannadasan. The song "Ennai Yaarendru" is based on Sindhu Bhairavi raga, "Indha Nadagam" is based on Shubhapantuvarali, "Kadhal Siragai" is based on Kapi, and "Paalum Pazhamum" is based on Natabhairavi. The song "Naan Pesa Ninaippathellam" was written by Kannadasan to showcase his friendship with Viswanathan.

Song	Singers	Length
"Aalaya Mainiyin"	P. Susheela	03:19
"Ennai Yaar Endru"	T. M. Soundararajan, P. Susheela	03:50
"Intha Nadagam"	P. Susheela	03:27
"Kadhal Siragai"	P. Susheela	04:04
"Naan Pesa Ninaippathellam"	T. M. Soundararajan, P. Susheela	03:06
"Naan Pesa Ninaippathellam" (Sad)	T. M. Soundararajan, P. Susheela	04:24
"Paalum Pazhamamum"	T. M. Soundararajan	03:23
"Ponaal Pogattum Poda"	T. M. Soundararajan, M. S. Viswanathan	06:10
"Thendral Varum"	P. Susheela	03:11

== Release and reception ==
Palum Pazhamum was released on 9 September 1961, and distributed by Sivaji Films. Kumudam praised the film for Saroja Devi's performance. Kanthan of Kalki criticised the film title's lack of relevance to the story, but called the film an entertainer. The film ran for over 100 days in theatres.

== In popular culture ==
The film's title also became the name for a collection of silk saris.
