= Parthal Pasi Theerum =

1962 film by A. Bhimsingh

- Theatrical release poster
- Directed by: A. Bhimsingh
- Screenplay by: A. Bhimsingh; Aaroor Dass (dialogues)
- Story by: A. C. Tirulokchandar
- Produced by: C. R. Basavaraju; A.V. Meiyappan
- Starring: Sivaji Ganesan; Gemini Ganesan; Savitri; B. Saroja Devi; Sowcar Janaki; Kamal Haasan
- Cinematography: G. Vittal Rao
- Edited by: A. Bhimsingh; A. Paul Duraisingh; R. Thirumalai
- Music by: Viswanathan–Ramamoorthy
- Production companies: AVM Productions; G. K. Productions
- Distributed by: AVM Productions
- Release date: 14 January 1962
- Running time: 159 minutes
- Country: India
- Language: Tamil

Parthal Pasi Theerum (pronounced [paːɾtːaːl pasi tiːɾɯm] transl. Just a look will quench hunger) is a 1962 Indian Tamil-language film directed by A. Bhimsingh. The film stars Sivaji Ganesan, Gemini Ganesan, Savitri, B. Saroja Devi and Sowcar Janaki, while Kamal Haasan was a child artist. It was released on 14 January 1962.

== Plot ==
Balu and Velu work in the British Indian Air Force and are fighting along side Allied forces in World War II. Their plane crashes due to a Japanese air-raid. Velu is grievously injured. Balu carries him 50 miles to a village in Assam. There Velu regains consciousness and his health starts improving under the care of Indroma and her father, in whose house they are staying. Japanese soldiers come in search of Balu and Velu. Balu hides Velu and when the soldiers are about to discover Velu, he gives himself up to save Velu. Velu recovers, and marries Indroma, teaches her Tamil and calls her Indra. Velu is found by members of the British Indian army the day after his wedding and has to leave with them, leaving his wife behind. Indra is pregnant and gives birth to a child, however, their village is bombed and she loses her eyesight. When Velu comes in search of his wife, he only sees the ruins of the former village and grieves thinking his wife is dead and goes to Chennai to his maternal uncle.

After five years, Balu, who had joined the Indian National Army under Subhash Chandra Bose when Bose had come to Japan, is acquitted in a court and released in Delhi. There, in a refugee camp, he sees a blind Indra and her son and learns that Indra's father had just died. He promises Indra that he will help her find Velu and unite them. So, Balu takes Indra and her son and travels to Chennai. Indra's son starts calling Balu appa in spite of Indra telling him not to. They find a place to stay in Chennai and the house owner promises Balu that he will help him get a job in his company. On going to his houseowners' office, Balu sees that the owner of that company is Velu. He becomes very happy and goes to Velu's house, only to see that Velu has married his maternal uncle's daughter Janaki, who has heart problems and also has a son. Balu also learns that Velu thinks that Indra is dead. Balu does not tell him the truth fearing Janaki would not be alive if he knew the truth. Velu gives Balu a very high position in his company. Janaki's sister Saro falls in love with Balu and Balu reciprocates. Meanwhile, Velu is shocked to discover that Indra and her son are alive and in Balu's house. Balu then tells him the truth about Indra, her blindness and Velu's son and cautions him not to talk with her as it might cause both Janaki and Indra to die. Janaki learns that Balu has a son and Saro loves Balu. She thinks that Balu is a married person ashamed of his blind wife and hence trying to cheat her sister. She hates him and cautions Saro against him. Saro comes to Balu's house, sees Indra's son Babu, calling Balu as his father and thinks that Balu has cheated her. Indra, on hearing this comes to Velu's house to meet Saro and clear the confusion. Velu, however, on seeing his blind wife pleading for Balu's innocence cannot contain himself and tells the truth to everyone. Janaki on hearing that Indra is her husband's first wife, cannot take the shock and dies. She unites Balu and Saro before dying and apologises to Balu for having suspected him and thanks him for all the sacrifices he has made for her husband and family. She also requests that her eyes be transplanted to Indra after her death so her vision will be restored.

== Cast ==
- Sivaji Ganesan as Balu
- Gemini Ganesan as Velu
- Savitri as Indra
- B. Saroja Devi as Saroja
- Sowcar Janaki as Janaki
- Kamal Haasan as Babu and Kumar (Dual role)
- K. A. Thangavelu as Chakrapani
- M. Saroja as Sandhana Lakshmi
- C. K. Saraswathi as Lakshmi

== Production ==
When S. A. Ashokan met M. Saravanan, he requested him to listen to a story titled Aval Thandha Vaazhvu written by A. C. Tirulokchandar which impressed Saravanan. C. R. Basavaraj who produced Bedara Kannappa with AVM in the past wanted to produce a film again with them. Meiyappan decided to produce the story Aval Thandha Vaazhvu alongside them as a collaboration. Saravanan initially wanted Tirulokchander to direct the film but as per the partner's request, A. Bhimsingh was chosen as director and the project eventually became Parthal Pasi Theerum. It is the first Tamil film where the main actors are not credited by name, but the text "Ungal Abhimana Nakshatrangal" (Your favourite stars) appears along with pictures of the actors; this was done due to disagreements over which actor should have the top billing.

== Soundtrack ==
The music was composed by Viswanathan–Ramamoorthy, with lyrics by Kannadasan.

Song	Singers	Length
"Andru Oomai Pennallo"	A. L. Raghavan, P. Susheela	07:05
"Andru Oomai Pennallo" (Female)	P. Susheela	03:46
"Kodi Asainthathum"	T. M. Soundararajan, P. Susheela	03:30
"Paarthal Pasi Theerum"	P. Susheela	03:22
"Pillaikku Thandhai Oruvan"	T. M. Soundararajan	03:01
"Ullam Yenbadhu"	T. M. Soundararajan	03:22
"Yaarukku Maapilai"	P. Susheela	03:32

== Release and reception ==
Parthal Pasi Theerum was released on 14 January 1962. The film was a major commercial success and had a theatrical run of over 100 days. The film was dubbed Telugu language as Pavithra Prema and released on 3 March 1962. On 19 January 1962, The Indian Express wrote, "Based on a story by A. C. Trilokachandar, glorifying true friendship and attachment, the offering is an interestingly entertaining film, notable for slick handling and subtle treatment". The 50 years of Golden jubilee of Parthal Pasi Theerum was celebrated in January 2012.

== Legacy ==
Paarthal Pasi Theerum is included alongside other Ganesan-starring films in the compilation DVD 8th Ulaga Adhisayam Sivaji.
