= Paaladai =

1967 film by A. Bhimsingh

- Poster
- Directed by: A. Bhimsingh
- Screenplay by: A. Bhimsingh
- Story by: Bilahari
- Produced by: M. R. Santhanam
- Starring: Sivaji Ganesan; Padmini; K. R. Vijaya
- Cinematography: G. Vittal Rao
- Edited by: A. Paul Duraisingham
- Music by: K. V. Mahadevan
- Production company: Kamala Pictures
- Release date: 16 June 1967
- Country: India
- Language: Tamil

Paaladai (transl. Milk skin) is a 1967 Indian Tamil-language film, directed by A. Bhimsingh and produced by M. R. Santhanam. The film stars Sivaji Ganesan, Padmini and K. R. Vijaya. It was released on 16 June 1967.

== Plot ==
Sekar is a rich man belonging to a royal lineage. He has been happily married to Janaki for around ten years, but they have had no children. He yearns for children and takes his wife to a gynecologist and they learn that Janaki cannot have children. Janaki decides to hide it from her husband as it would devastate him completely. Janaki's sister Santha comes to stay with them during her vacations. By chance, Sivaji learns that his wife is infertile. He consoles her. The next morning, Sivaji has a dream about a child and he explains it to Santha and they start growing closer. Janaki plans to get her sister married to her husband. Janaki pleads for Santha to marry her husband. Santha resists initially, but gradually agrees for her sister. After the wedding, Janaki learns that she is pregnant. She sends her sister and husband to Aanaikatty for a honeymoon. In Aanaikatty, they start living together happily. They received a letter there from Janaki mentioning about her pregnancy. Both are happy for her. But Sivaji leaves Santha alone to see Janaki. However Santha managed to see Janaki and expressed her love. Afterwards Sivaji started to ignore Santha, so she was depressed and attempted suicide. However Janaki prepared to abort her child in order to make them live happily. But both of them were saved by Sivaji. Janaki and Santha got into an accident in which Janaki gave birth to her child and died. Santha was saved and the three started their new life.

== Cast ==
- Sivaji Ganesan as Sekar, an engineer
- Padmini as Janaki
- K. R. Vijaya as Shantha, Janaki's sister
- V. K. Ramasamy as Sekar Ungel
- V. Gopalakrishnan as Ramu
- Nagesh as Vaigundam
- Manorama as Sornam
- T. P. Muthulakshmi as Aadhilakshmi
- Senthamarai as James, Sekar's friend
- Seethalakshmi as Dr. Lakshmi Rao
- C. I. D. Sakunthala as Dancer

== Soundtrack ==
Soundtrack was composed by K. V. Mahadevan.

Song	Singers	Lyrics	Duration
"Engey Engey En Kannukku"	T. M. Soundararajan & P. Susheela	Kannadasan	03:36
"Appadi Enna Parvai"	P. Susheela	Kannadasan	04:47
"Pattadai Thottil"	P. Susheela	Kannadasan	03:17
"Duettu Duettu Padum"	Tharapuram Sundarajan & K. Jamuna Rani	Thanjai Vanan	03:29

== Reception ==
Kalki said the storyline lacked newness, but appreciated the cast performances.
