= Bandha Pasam =

1962 film directed by A. Bhimsingh

- Theatrical release poster
- Directed by: A. Bhimsingh
- Screenplay by: A. Bhimsingh
- Story by: Valampuri Somanathan
- Produced by: Periyanna
- Starring: Sivaji Ganesan; Gemini Ganesan; Savitri; Devika
- Cinematography: G. Vittal Rao
- Edited by: A. Bhimsingh; A. Paul Duraisingh; R. Thirumalai
- Music by: Viswanathan–Ramamoorthy
- Production company: Shanthi Films
- Distributed by: Sivaji Productions
- Release date: 27 October 1962
- Running time: 154 minutes
- Country: India
- Language: Tamil

Bandha Pasam (transl. Relationships) is a 1962 Indian Tamil-language drama film written and directed by A. Bhimsingh from a story by Valampuri Somanathan. The film stars Sivaji Ganesan, Gemini Ganesan, Savitri and Devika. It was released on 27 October 1962.

== Plot ==
Parthiban, a student-writer, and Saravanan, a student are the sons of Vedhachalam and Meenakshi. It is a very close knit, loving and caring family. Vedhachalam runs a successful business that runs in lakhs. Vedhachalam loses all his money as the bank he kept all his money at declares bankruptcy, leaving him paraplegic in shock.

Parthiban, during a case of mistaken identity, meets Manonmani, falls in love with her and with her help starts working in a press. Her boss's daughter, Poonkodi is the lover of Saravanan and they have parted ways due to her hasty nature of misreading Saravanan's situation. How the situation gets resolved with the couples getting united and the family getting back on their feet is the rest of the story.

== Cast ==
- Sivaji Ganesan as Parthiban
- Gemini Ganesan as Saravanan
- Savitri as Poonkodi
- Devika as Manonmani
- S. V. Ranga Rao as Vedhachalam
- M. V. Rajamma as Meenakshi
- V. K. Ramasamy as Chithra's father
- J. P. Chandrababu as Vasu
- Sukumari as Chithra
- Chandrakantha as Gowri
- M. R. Santhanam as Thandavarayan Pillai
- 'Kottappuli' Jayaraman as Editor

== Soundtrack ==
The music was composed by Viswanathan–Ramamoorthy. The "Pandhal Irundhaal Kodi Padarum" song's pallavi is loosely based on "Eternally", composed by Charlie Chaplin.

Song	Singers	Lyrics
"En Kathaithaan"	P. Susheela, S. Janaki	'Kavi' Rajagopal
"Eppo Vechikalam"	J. P. Chandrababu	Mayavanathan
"Idhazh Mottu Virindhida"	P. B. Sreenivas, P. Susheela	Mayavanathan
"Kavalaigal Kidaikattum"	T. M. Soundararajan, P. B. Sreenivas	Mayavanathan
"Nitham Nitham"	Sirkazhi Govindarajan	Mayavanathan
"Pandhal Irundhaal Kodi Padarum"	T. M. Soundararajan, S. Janaki	'Kavi' Rajagopal

== Release and reception ==
Bandha Pasam was released on 27 October 1962. Kanthan of Kalki appreciated the performances of the cast, particularly Devika, Ranga Rao and Rajamma, but criticised the music and the title's lack of relevance to the story.
