= Mayadari Malligadu =

1973 Telugu film by Adurthi Subba Rao

- Theatrical release poster
- Directed by: Adurthi Subba Rao
- Screenplay by: Adurthi Subba Rao
- Story by: Adurthi Kameswari Bala
- Dialogues by: Satyanand
- Produced by: Adurthi Bhaskar; M. S. Prasad; Adurthi Subba Rao (presenter)
- Starring: Krishna; Manjula; Jayanthi; Anjali Devi; Nagabhushanam; Padmanabham
- Cinematography: K. S. Ramakrishna
- Edited by: Adurthi Harinath
- Music by: K. V. Mahadevan
- Production companies: Ravi Kala Mandir; Padmalaya Movies (presenter)
- Distributed by: Annapurna Pictures
- Release date: 5 October 1973
- Running time: 2 hr 30 min
- Country: India
- Language: Telugu

Mayadari Malligadu (transl. Mountebank Malli) is a 1973 Indian Telugu-language drama film directed by Adurthi Subba Rao. The film stars Krishna and Manjula in lead roles, with Jayanthi, Anjali Devi, and Nagabhushanam in pivotal roles. It marks the debut of Manjula as a lead actress in Telugu cinema and features Krishna in the role of a bold, rebellious protagonist.

The film was both a critical and commercial success, boosted by its soundtrack composed by K. V. Mahadevan, with songs like "Navvuthu Bathakalira" becoming iconic. The film also helped launch the career of screenwriter Satyanand, marking the start of his significant contributions to Telugu cinema.

== Plot ==
Munasabu Gangaraju (Nagabhushanam) is a corrupt and malevolent man, in stark contrast to his son, Ramu (Master Ramu), who is devout and virtuous. When Gangaraju murders Bala Brahmandanda Swamy (Padmanabham), he frames an innocent man, Mallanna (Krishna), for the crime. However, Ramu witnesses the murder, placing him in a moral dilemma. He must choose between exposing his father's crime, which would result in his father's execution, or remaining silent, condemning Mallanna to an unjust punishment. This internal conflict forms the crux of the film's narrative.

== Cast ==
- Krishna as Mallanna
- Manjula as Chandirka
- Jayanthi as Pankajam
- Anjali Devi
- Nagabhushanam as Munasabu Gangaraju
- Prasanna Rani as Sarada
- Padmanabham as Bala Brahmandanda Swamy
- Sakshi Ranga Rao as Karanam
- Raja Babu as Officer Aiswaryam
- Master Ramu as Ramu
- K. V. Chalam
- Mada Venkateswara Rao

Guest appearance

- Kantha Rao
- Krishnam Raju as Public prosecutor
- Chandra Mohan
- Dhulipala as Judge
- Ram Mohan as Defence lawyer

== Production ==
=== Development ===
Director Adurthi Subba Rao faced challenges during the production of Maayadari Malligadu. After setbacks in the Hindi film industry, he returned to Telugu cinema with plans to cast newcomers, including Sarath Babu as the lead. Inspired by his earlier success with Thene Manasulu (1965), which introduced new talent, Subba Rao aimed to replicate that formula. However, his colleagues advised against the financial risks of working with newcomers and suggested approaching Krishna, whom Subba Rao had launched as a lead actor in Thene Manasulu. Subba Rao met Krishna, who immediately agreed to star in the film, providing his call sheets without hesitation and prioritizing the project to support his mentor.

Subba Rao initially envisioned a concept similar to his earlier film Sudigundalu (1968), focused on the moral conflict of teaching children to always tell the truth while occasionally instructing them not to. The film aimed to explore the psychological consequences of such contradictions on children. However, recognizing that a children-centric film might not be commercially viable, the script was adapted to include other characters to broaden its appeal.

=== Cast and crew ===
The film featured Krishna in an unconventional role for a social drama, portraying a character who stands against injustice and corruption. His appearance was marked by a distinctive look, including a checked lungi, thin shirt, scarf around the neck, wide belt, and a stick. This unique presentation, combined with the character's bold and assertive personality, contributed to the film's appeal and left a lasting impression on audiences.

Maayadari Malligadu marked the first collaboration between Krishna and Manjula as co-stars. Although it was her second appearance in Telugu cinema after Jai Jawan (1970), it was her debut as a lead actress in Telugu. Manjula, who was under contract with Tamil superstar M. G. Ramachandran (MGR), was cast in the film after Ramachandran released her for the project at Subba Rao's request. During filming, Satyanand helped her improve her Telugu proficiency. The film played a pivotal role in establishing Manjula as a leading actress in Telugu cinema.

The film also marked the debut of Satyanand, director Adurthi Subba Rao's nephew, who wrote the dialogues for the film. Initially an assistant director, Subba Rao encouraged Satyanand to switch to screenwriting. After Satyanand wrote dialogues for scenes around a song with Krishna and Manjula, Subba Rao was impressed and mentored him in screenwriting. Success of Mayadari Malligadu led to further opportunities, launching his career as a screenwriter.

=== Filming ===
Annapurna Pictures, who agreed to distribute the film, set a condition to Subba Rao that it be made in black-and-white with a budget cap of ₹8 lakh. Subba Rao accepted these terms. However, Krishna opposed the idea, recalling Subba Rao's earlier achievement of making Thene Manasulu in colour, despite it featuring newcomers with no established market. Krishna insisted that Maayadari Malligadu also be filmed in colour, offering to arrange the necessary film stock, which was scarce and difficult to procure at the time. Using his influence, Krishna secured the colour film.

Subba Rao entrusted K. Viswanath, his protégé, to direct the courtroom climax scenes due to scheduling conflicts with his Hindi ventures. The song "Navvuthu Bathakalira" was filmed at Bangalore Central Jail, as noted in the film's credits.

== Music ==
The soundtrack, composed by K. V. Mahadevan, significantly contributed to the film's success. Songs such as "Navvuthu Bathakalira,", and "Malle Pandiri Needalona," became timeless classics.

Track list
No.	Title	Lyrics	Singer(s)	Length
1.	"Mallepandiri Needalona"	Acharya Atreya	P. Suseela
2.	"Thalaki Neellosukoni"	Acharya Atreya	S. P. Balasubrahmanyam, P. Suseela
3.	"Vastha vellostha"	Acharya Atreya	S. P. Balasubrahmanyam, P. Suseela
4.	"Navvuthu Bathakali Ra"	Acharya Atreya	S. P. Balasubrahmanyam
5.	"Hari Harilo Ranga Hari"	Kosaraju	Madhavapeddi Satyam and group
6.	"Turrupitta Turrupitta"	Acharya Atreya	P. Suseela

== Reception ==
=== Critical reception ===
Maayadari Malligadu was well received by both critics and audiences. Krishna's performance, along with those of Jayanthi and Anjali Devi, was praised. Jayanthi's performance stood out, while Anjali Devi's acting was also appreciated. The music by K. V. Mahadevan, featuring popular songs, was another highlight of the film.

=== Box office ===
Produced on a budget of ₹11 lakh, the film grossed ₹13 lakh share within 40 days of its release. Krishna took the Guntur region distribution rights as part of his remuneration.

The film was distributed by Annapurna Pictures, associated with Akkineni Nageswara Rao. However, to accommodate Nageswara Rao's Marapurani Manishi, Mayadari Malligadu was removed from 14 centres after 49 days. It was also replaced in Sudarshan 70mm theatre in Hyderabad on its 99th day by Premalu Pellillu, disappointing many fans.

== Legacy ==
The film remains a notable film in Krishna's career, celebrated for its engaging narrative, distinctive character design, and memorable music. It is also notable for Manjula's debut as a lead actress.

Mayadari Malligadu also marked the debut of Satyanand, the nephew of director Adurthi Subba Rao, who wrote the dialogues for the film. Initially an assistant director, Satyanand was encouraged by Subba Rao to transition to screenwriting, which led to a successful career spanning over 400 films.
