= Dagudu Moothalu =

1964 film by Adurthi Subba Rao

- Theatrical release poster
- Directed by: Adurthi Subba Rao
- Screenplay by: Adurthi Subba Rao
- Story by: Mullapudi Venkata Ramana
- Produced by: D. B. Narayana
- Starring: N. T. Rama Rao; B. Saroja Devi
- Cinematography: P. L. Roy
- Edited by: T. Krishna
- Music by: K. V. Mahadevan
- Production company: D. B. N. Productions
- Distributed by: Navayuga Films
- Release date: 21 August 1964
- Running time: 139 minutes
- Country: India
- Language: Telugu

Dagudu Moothalu (transl. Hide and seek) is a 1964 Indian Telugu-language comedy film produced by D. B. Narayana and directed by Adurthi Subba Rao, who also wrote the screenplay. Based on a story by Mullapudi Venkata Ramana, it stars N. T. Rama Rao and B. Saroja Devi. In Dagudu Moothalu, the distant relatives of an ailing man attempt to usurp his wealth, while making sure that his grandson, the rightful heir, does not inherit the said wealth.

Ramana took plot details of the 1936 American film Mr. Deeds Goes to Town – the title character inheriting a huge property and subsequently being branding a lunatic by miscreants who are after his wealth – but then wrote a story creating new characters and situations, Dagudu Moothalu. The film was released on 21 August 1964, and became a commercial success. It was later remade in Tamil as Avan Pithana? (1966) and in Hindi as Jwaar Bhata (1973).

== Cast ==
- N. T. Rama Rao as Sundara Rao Jr. "Sundarayya"
- B. Saroja Devi as Subba Lakshmi "Subbulu"
- Gummadi as Viswasundara Rao
- Ramana Reddy as Bhushanam
- Padmanabham as Papayi
- Allu Ramalingaiah as Siddhanthi Gavarayya
- Suryakantham as Sooramma
- Sharada as Ammadu
- Raavi Kondala Rao as the family doctor
- Radha Kumari as Bhushanam's wife

== Production ==
=== Development ===
In 1962, producer D. B. Narayana of D. B. N. Productions assigned Mullapudi Venkata Ramana to write the story and dialogues for his next production, which would star N. T. Rama Rao. Ramana took plot details of the 1936 American film Mr. Deeds Goes to Town – the title character inheriting a huge property and subsequently being branding a lunatic by miscreants who are after his wealth – and wrote a story creating new characters and situations, Dagudu Moothalu. Adurthi Subba Rao was hired to direct, and wrote the screenplay based on Ramana's story. Cinematography was handled by P. L. Roy, and editing by T. Krishna.

=== Casting and filming ===
N. T. Rama Rao was cast as the male lead Sundarayya, and Dagudu Moothalu was his first film under Adurthi's direction. He was paid a remuneration of ₹40,000 (equivalent to ₹3.2 million or US$33,000 in 2026). B. Saroja Devi was cast as the female lead Subbulu, and was paid ₹80,000 (equivalent to ₹6.4 million or US$66,000 in 2026). Raavi Kondala Rao played the family doctor, thereby making his entry as a professional actor. During the shoot, Saroja Devi had a ligament tear; because of this, the sets which were constructed for filming the songs "Mella Mella Mellaga" and "Adagaka Icchina Manase" in Vauhini Studios had to be dismantled, leading to escalated costs and production delays. Distraught, Adurti rushed to Saroja Devi's Bangalore home, and was ready to replace her with Krishna Kumari, but realised her condition was worse than they had imagined. The songs were eventually filmed around Lal Bagh, Ulsoor Lake and Cubbon Park.

== Soundtrack ==
The soundtrack was composed by K. V. Mahadevan.

No.	Title	Lyrics	Singer(s)	Length
1.	"Divvi Divvi Divvittam"	Aarudhra	Pithapuram Nageswara Rao, Swarnalatha	3:26
2.	"Andhalam Yekkaadammaa"	Aatreya	Ghantasala, P. Susheela	3:31
3.	"Mella Mella Mellag"	Aatreya	Ghantasala, P. Susheela	4:42
4.	"Devudane Vadu Unnada"	Aatreya	Ghantasala, P. Susheela	3:36
5.	"Goronka Gootike"	Dasarathi	Ghantasala	3:07
6.	"Goranka Kendhuko"	Dasarathi	P. Susheela	3:21
7.	"Yenkocchindhoi Maamaa"	Aarudhra	P. Susheela	3:36
8.	"Adagaka Ichina"	Aatreya	Ghantasala, P. Susheela	3:30

== Release and reception ==
Dagudu Moothalu was released on 21 August 1964, with Navayuga Films acquiring the distribution rights. The film was commercially successful, and was later remade in Tamil as Avan Pithana? (1966) and in Hindi as Jwaar Bhata (1973).

== Bibliography ==
- Narwekar, Sanjit (1994). Directory of Indian film-makers and films. Flicks Books. ISBN 978-0-948911-40-8.
