= List of songs recorded by Ghantasala =

List of songs by Indian Singer Ghantasala Venkateswararao

Ghantasala is a singer of Telugu cinema. This is a compilation of few of his songs.

Year	Film	Song/s
1945	Swargaseema	Oh Naa Raaja
1946	Gruhapravesam	Marutundoy
1947	Palnati Yudham	Chutamurarayya, Metadavini, Teeripoyena, Tera Teeyagarada
1947	Yogi Vemana	Aaparani
1948	Balaraju	Cheliya Kanarava, Navodayam, Telechudumu
1948	Drohi	Poovu Cheri
1948	Ratnamala	Oorandakada
1949	Dharmangada	Deekshakankana Dhari
1949	Guna Sundari Katha	Amma Mahalakshmi
1949	Keelu Gurram	Entakrupamative, Evaruchesina, Gaalikanna, Kadusuma, Mana Kali, Teliyavasama
1949	Laila Majnu	Chelunigani, Cherararo, Jeevana Mugisena, Manachugadha, Neevenenaachaduvu, Poduvopriyatama, Ravonanumarachitivo, Viritavula
1949	Mana Desam	Daarulukache, Jayajanani, Kallaninnu, Maatamarmamu, Oho Bharatayuvaka, Vaishnava ( Gujarati), Vedalipo
1949	Raksh Rekha	Jeevana Doli, O Ohorajasukumara, Rama Rama Sankeertanaye
1950	Aahuti	Hamsavale, Janana Marana, Oo Priya Balanura
1950	Lakshmamma	Amma Lakshmamma, Chinnanati, Nenevirajaji, Padinadarini, Tadhim Thim
1950	Palletoori Pilla	Premamaya, Santa Vanti
1950	Samsaram	Andala Chandamama, Samsaram Samsaram, Taku Taku Taku
1950	Shavukaru	Emanane, Palukaradate, Sreeluchelange ( Harikatha)
1950	Swapna Sundari	Eeseema Velasina, Kanaga Naitiniga, Nijamaye Kala Nijamaye, Sagumaa
1951	Malliswari	Aakasa Veedhilo, Avuna Nijamena, Parugulu Teeyali
1951	Nirdoshi	Swagatam Swagatam
1951	Patala Bhairavi	Entaghatu Premayo, Hayiga, Kalavaramaye, Kanugona, Premakosamai
1952	Palletooru	Aa Manasulona, Aa Sankrantiki, Aapadala, Andhruda, Cheyetti, O Mithari, Polalananni, Ramahare, Vachindoy Sankranti
1952	Pelli Chesi Choodu	Bayamenduke, Eejagamanta, Evaro Evaro, O Manasa, Pellichesukuni, Radhanura, Yevadottado
1952	Prema	Divya Premaku, Na Prema Nava, Rojuku Roju
1952	Priyuralu	Anandam Mana, Avani Neepathi
1952	Tingu Ranga	Belavugaa Kana, Jaalavugaa, Kavi Kalamunaku, Munipidi, Raaja Maharaja, Syamala Syamala
1953	Brathuku Theruvu	Andame Anandam
1953	Chandirani	O Tarakaa O Jabilee Navvulela
1953	Devadasu	Cheliyaledu, Jagamemaya, Kala Idani, Kudi Edamaite, O Devada, Pallekupodam
1953	Kanna Talli	Chuchava, Enta Manchi
1953	Paropakaaram	Hrudayama, Jodedlanaduma, Valapula
1953	Pempudu Koduku	Mabbu Mabbulu
1953	Pichi Pullayya	Alapinchana, Yellavelalandu
1953	Prapancham	Premasudha
1956	Tenali Raman	Ullaasam Thedum Ellorum Or Naal
1957	Iru Sagodharigal	Ini Manam Pola Naame
1957	Mayabazar	Choopulu Kalisina Shubavela, Lahiri Lahiri Lahirilo, Nee Kosame Ne Jeevinchunadi, Nevena Nanu Pilichinadi, Sundari Oho Sundari
1957	Vinayaka Chaviti	Dinakara Subhakara, Vatapi Ganapatim Bhaje
1963	Lava Kusha	Jagadabhi Ramudu Sreeramude, Sandhehinchakumammu, Ye Nimishaniki Yemi Jaruguno
1966	Shri Krishna Pandaviyam	Mattu Vadalara Niddura Mattu Vadalala, Priyurala Siggelane
1967	Rahasyam	Girija Kalyanam (Yakshagana), Thirumala Girivasa
1971	Ramalayam	Jagadabhi Rama Raghukula Soma, Mamuganna Tallira Bhoodevi
