= Nandi Awards of 1967 =

Indian Telugu film and TV awards ceremony

The Nandi Awards were presented annually by the Government of Andhra Pradesh. The first awards were given in 1964. The following films were awarded in 1967.

== 1967 Nandi Awards Winners List ==
Category	Winner	Film
Best Feature Film	Adurthi Subba Rao	Sudigundalu
Second Best Feature Film	S. V. Ranga Rao	Chadarangam
Third Best Feature Film	Chitrapu Narayana Rao	Bhakta Prahlada
