= Dabbuki Lokam Dasoham =

- Theatrical release poster
- Directed by: D. Yoganand
- Story by: Modukuri Johnson
- Produced by: M. Jagannatha Rao
- Starring: N. T. Rama Rao; Jamuna
- Cinematography: R. Sampath
- Edited by: B. Gopala Rao
- Music by: K. V. Mahadevan
- Production company: S.V.S. Films
- Release date: 12 January 1973
- Running time: 172 mins
- Country: India
- Language: Telugu

Dabbuki Lokam Dasoham (transl. The World is a Slave to Money) is a 1973 Indian Telugu-language drama film, produced by M. Jagannatha Rao under the S.V.S. Films banner and directed by D. Yoganand. It stars N. T. Rama Rao, Jamuna and music composed by K. V. Mahadevan.

== Cast ==
- N. T. Rama Rao as Ramu
- Jamuna as Aruna
- S. V. Ranga Rao as President Dharma Rao
- Relangi as Brahmananda Swamy
- Satyanarayana as Satyam
- Allu Ramalingaiah as Chalamaiah
- Padmanabham as Lottery Babu
- Mikkilineni as Durgaiah
- Raavi Kondala Rao as Ekambaram
- Sakshi Ranga Rao as Kodandam
- Rama Prabha as Chittithalli
- Leela Rani as Lakshmi
- Vijaya Bhanu
- Y. Vijaya as Tulasi
- Nirmalamma

== Soundtrack ==
Dabbuki Lokam Dasoham

Film score by K. V. Mahadevan
- Released: 1973
- Genre: Soundtrack
- Length: 33:16
- Producer: K. V. Mahadevan

K. V. Mahadevan chronology
Badi Panthulu (1972)	Dabbuki Lokam Dasoham (1973)	Desoddharakulu (1973)

Music composed by K. V. Mahadevan.

S. No.	Song title	Lyrics	Singers	length
1	"Ek Do Teen"	Kosaraju	Ghantasala	4:26
2	"Gaali Okkanisommu Kaadu"	C. Narayana Reddy	Ghantasala, P. Susheela, Ramadevi	4:11
3	"Nuvvu Nenu"	C. Narayana Reddy	Ghantasala, P. Susheela	4:14
4	"Thaaguthaa Neeyavva"	Kosaraju	Madhavapeddi Satyam	4:14
5	"Chusthunava O Deva"	C. Narayana Reddy	Ghantasala	3:32
6	"Chepalani Vunadi"	Kosaraju	Pithapuram, L.R.Eswari	3:56
7	"Nuvvu Nenu"	C. Narayana Reddy	Ghantasala	3:28
8	"Dabbuku Lokam Daasoham"	C. Narayana Reddy	Madhavapeddi Satyam, Pithapuram, Mohan Raju, P. Benerjee	5:15
