= Srungara Ramudu =

- Theatrical release poster
- Directed by: K. Shankar
- Written by: D. V. Narasa Raju(dialogues)
- Screenplay by: P. D. Shenoy
- Story by: P. D. Shenoy
- Produced by: Rama Murthy
- Starring: N. T. Rama Rao; Latha
- Cinematography: D. V. Rajaram
- Edited by: K. Shankar; R. Krishnan
- Music by: K. V. Mahadevan
- Production company: Satyatai Productions
- Release date: 22 November 1979
- Country: India
- Language: Telugu

Srungara Ramudu (transl. Romantic Rama) is a 1979 Indian Telugu-language action drama film directed by K. Shankar. It stars N. T. Rama Rao and Latha, with music composed by K. V. Mahadevan. It was produced by Rama Murthy under the Satyatai Productions banner. This film is remake of Hindi film Kashmir Ki Kali (1964).

== Cast ==
- N. T. Rama Rao as Rajaram
- Latha as Shanti
- Prabhakar Reddy as Rama Narayana
- Allu Ramalingaiah as Lingam
- Sarath Babu as Jaipal
- Tyagaraju as Lakshmi Narayana
- Nalinikanth as Pratap
- Ram Mohan as Bank Manager Satyanarayana
- Kakarala as Rangaiah
- Ch. Krishna Murthy as Govinda Narayana
- Mukkamala as Rama Narayana's Lawyer
- Pandari Bai as Jaya
- Ceylon Manohar as Jaipal's henchman
- Rama Prabha
- Jayamalini as Rita
- Dubbing Janaki as Seeta, Satyanarayana's wife

== Soundtrack ==
Srungara Ramudu

Film score by K. V. Mahadevan
- Released: 1979
- Genre: Soundtrack
- Length: 26:34
- Label: AVM Audio
- Producer: K. V. Mahadevan

K. V. Mahadevan chronology
KD No:1 (1979)	Srungara Ramudu (1979)	Circus Ramudu (1980)

Music composed by K. V. Mahadevan. Lyrics were written by Acharya Aatreya.

S. No	Song title	Singers	length
1	"Eeroju Eeroje"	S. P. Balasubrahmanyam	3:50
2	"How Are You"	S. P. Balasubrahmanyam	4:06
3	"Nandamuri Andagaada"	S. P. Balasubrahmanyam, Vani Jayaram	4:46
4	"Cheeteeki Praanam"	Vani Jayaram	4:09
5	"Aadedhe Aadadhi"	P. Susheela	3:56
6	"Vasthanannavu"	S. P. Balasubrahmanyam, Vani Jayaram	5:47
