= Tulasi (1974 film) =

Telugu film

- Cinema Poster
- Directed by: K.Baburao
- Starring: Krishnam Raju Kalpana
- Music by: Ghantasala Venkateswararao
- Production company: Vijaya Productions
- Release date: 23 May 1974
- Language: Telugu

Tulasi is a Telugu film which was released on 23 May 1974. It was made under the banner of Ramavijeta Films, starring Krishnamraju and Kalpana. Music for the movie was composed by Ghantasala Venkateswar Rao.

== Music ==
Song	Author	Music	Singer(s)
Kaliki mutyala koliki	Singireddy Narayanareddy	Ghantasala (musician)	P. Susheela, L. R. Eswari
Chengu Chenguna Dookindi Vayasu	Aarudra	Ghantasala (musician)	P. Susheela
Laali Naa kanna	Dasarathi	Ghantasala (musician)	P. Susheela
Selayeti Gala Gala	Aarudra	Ghantasala (musician)	S. P. Balasubrahmanyam, P. Susheela
Ee rallaku Nollunte	Acharya Aatreya	Ghantasala (musician)	S. P. Balasubrahmanyam
Brundavanamuna Chindulu Veyu Gopalude	Kosaraju Raghavayya	Ghantasala (musician)	P. Susheela
