= Private Master =

- Theatrical release poster
- Directed by: K. Viswanath
- Written by: Mullapudi Venkata Ramana
- Screenplay by: K. Viswanath
- Story by: Tapi Dharma Rao
- Produced by: B. H. V. Chalapathi Rao; T. Rammoorthy Sarma; T. V. S. Seshagiri Rao; K. L. Veerraju
- Starring: Ram Mohan; Krishna; Kanchana; Sukanya; Gummadi; Relangi
- Cinematography: K. N. Ramakrishnarao
- Edited by: B. Goapala Rao
- Music by: K. V. Mahadevan
- Production company: D. B. N. Films
- Distributed by: Sree Films
- Release date: 14 September 1967
- Running time: 156 minutes
- Country: India
- Language: Telugu

Private Master is a 1967 Indian Telugu-language drama film directed by K. Viswanath. Ram Mohan plays the titular private master and Krishna is the main antagonist. The film title is noticeable for its use of English in an era of Telugu-only titles. The producer decided to use an English title which in Telugu means "Tuition Teacher".

== Plot ==
Sridhar Rao appears as a wealthy man with two daughters, Sundari and Raaji. Prasad Rao is appointed as a private tutor for Raaji. While tutoring Raaji, Prasad falls in love with Sundari. Sundari and Prasad decide to marry with the permission of their elders. Meanwhile, a young man named Krishna is seeking to make his fortune and is prepared to do anything to achieve his aim. With the help of his friends, Bobby and Jaya, Krishna traps Sridhar Rao and wants to become his son-in-law. Sridhar is tempted to forget the help he got from Jagannath Rao, father of Prasad Rao, and marries daughter Sundari to Krishna. A conflict arises for Sundari, whose true love is Prasad.

Grandfather Relangi comes to the rescue and helps Sundari and Prasad marry in a temple. To ease the tension and save the family prestige, Raaji convinces Krishna to marry her instead of Sundari. Sridhar Rao throws Sundari out of the family home, leaving Sundari and Prasad to start their new lives in poverty, while, Krishna, having married Raaji, begins accumulating personal riches from the Rao family. Krishna and Prasad Rao fail in their schemes to earn money. Prasad and Sundari recruit Sundari's grandfather to help expose Krishna and his friends. The film concludes with Prasad and Sundari reunited with the Rao family.

== Cast ==
- Ram Mohan as Prasad Rao
- Krishna as Krishna
- Kanchana as Sundari
- Sukanya as Raaji
- Gummadi as Sridhar Rao
- Pushpakumari as
- Relangi as Sundari's grandfather
- V. Nagayya as Jagannath Rao
- Meena Kumari as
- Chalam as Bobby
- Vijayalalitha as Jaya
- Allu Ramalingaih as Assistant Rattaih
- Surabhi Balasaraswati as Maalakshmi
- Kanaka Durga as
- Udayalakshmi as
- Sobhan Babu as Raghu
- Ravi Kondala Rao as Postman Kutumbiah
- Peketi as
- P.J. Sarma as
- Balakrishna as
- Sambasiva Rao as
- Seetharam as
- Vadlamani Viswanatham as
- Madhavaswamy as
- Narayana as
- Kantha Rao as
- Suryakantham as
- Nagabhushanam as
- Padmanabham as
- Vanisri as

== Soundtrack ==
There are 8 songs in the film with music composed by K. V. Mahadevan.

No.	Title	Lyrics	Singer(s)	Length
1.	"Addamlo Kanipinchedi"	Aatreya	Ghantasala, P. Susheela
2.	"Chiru Chiru Jallula"	Aatreya	P.Susheela
3.	"Ekkada Untavo"	C. Narayana Reddy	P. B. Srinivas, S. Janaki
4.	"Ekkadikellave Pilla"	Kosaraju	Pithapuram Nageswara Rao, P. Susheela
5.	"Mallepoola Mancham Undi"	Aatreya	P. Susheela
6.	"Manasunte Chaladule"	Aatreya	S. Janaki
7.	"Paaduko Paaduko"	Arudra	S. P. Balasubrahmanyam
8.	"Teravaku Teravaku"	C. Narayana Reddy	Ghantasala Venkateswara Rao
