= Manchi Manasulu =

1962 Telugu film by Adurthi Subba Rao

- Theatrical release poster
- Directed by: Adurthi Subba Rao
- Written by: Acharya Aatreya (dialogues)
- Screenplay by: Adurthi Subba Rao; Acharya Aatreya
- Story by: K. S. Gopalakrishnan
- Based on: Kumudham (1961)
- Produced by: C. Sundaram
- Starring: Akkineni Nageswara Rao; Savitri
- Cinematography: P. L. Roy
- Edited by: T. Krishna
- Music by: K. V. Mahadevan
- Production company: Babu Films
- Distributed by: Sri Films
- Release date: 11 April 1962
- Running time: 163 minutes
- Country: India
- Language: Telugu

Manchi Manasulu (transl. Good Hearts) is a 1962 Indian Telugu-language drama film directed by Adurthi Subba Rao. It stars Akkineni Nageswara Rao and Savitri, with music composed by K. V. Mahadevan. The film was produced by C. Sundaram under the Babu Movies banner. It was a remake of the Tamil film Kumudham (1961), also directed by Subba Rao.

== Plot ==
A blacksmith, Rangaiah, lives with his daughter, Jaya, in a village. He strives hard to civilize his sibling Venu at Madras, without caring for his own health and well being. Thus, Venu ventures for affordable lodging to soothe his brother. Subsequently, he trespasses an empathetic soul, Public Prosecutor Anand Rao, who aids him in enabling their summer house free of charge. Plus, he forges Venu as a family man since his wife Suryakantam withholds it to bachelors. However, Anand Rao’s daughter discerns it when she endears him.

Parallelly, in their village, Shankaraiah resides with his debauchery son Kumar & blind daughter Radha. Kumar entraps Jaya, who also holds an amour Mallika, and tricks her. After triumphing in his graduation, Venu walks to his brother, accompanying Anand Rao’s family to fix his alliance with Shanti. So far, Rangaiah is terminally ill and has died, laying Jaya’s responsibility on Venu. Later, he detects Kumar and Jaya’s love affair and proceeds with bridal connections. Shankaraiah stipulates that Venu knits Radha in instead, which puts him into a dichotomy. He affirms the status quo to Shanti when she convinces Venu, and both marriages take place. Venu cannot be from Shanti’s memories and steer clear of Radha. All the while, Shanti arrives, mitigates the situation, nears Radha to Venu, and she conceives. The two delightfully move to a tour at Hampi.

Meanwhile, Mallika lands, identifying Kumar’s hellish hue. So, he silently takes her to Mahabalipuram, stabs and throws her from the cliff. Listening to the cry, Venu rushes where he spots Kumar absconding. During that predicament, Venu accuses himself of considering Jaya’s future. Fortuitously, while skipping, Kumar stomps his foot on Radha, and she is conscious of that sense. Shanti files the case as the defense counsel against her father, and the heated arguments continue.

One night, Kumar divulges the fact to Jaya in an alcoholic state when she stands for righteousness and divulges it to Shanti. Radha also makes out her brother as the same when he re-stomps her, but it is not satisfactory. Following this, Kumar smacks and dumps Jaya in a decrepit temple, where she notices the murder weapon and worn cloth hidden by her husband. Forthwith, she speeds to the court and produces the evidence. Here, remorseful Kumar collapses, admits his crime, and is penalized for seven years. At last, Shanti acquits Venu when Radha delivers a baby boy. Finally, the movie ends happily with the couple’s reunion and Shanti advancing for her life.

== Cast ==
- Akkineni Nageswara Rao as Venu
- Savitri as Santhi
- Shavukaru Janaki as Radha
- S. V. Ranga Rao as Ananda Rao
- Gummadi as Rangayya
- Ramana Reddy as Sankarayya
- Nagabhushanam as Kumar
- Allu Ramalingaiah as Bheemanna, witness
- Vangara as Vaikuntam
- Suryakantham as Suryakanthamma
- Vasanthi as Jaya
- Chidatala Appa Rao
- Potti Prasad as Jogulu, Kumar's sidekick
- Suryakala as Mallika

== Music ==
Manchi Manasulu

Film score by K. V. Mahadevan
- Released: 1962
- Genre: Soundtrack
- Length: 27:59
- Producer: K. V. Mahadevan

Music was composed by K. V. Mahadevan, who reused some songs from the original while composing new songs such as “Silalapai Silpaalu,” “Yemandoi Srivaru,” and “Yentha Takkari Vaadu.” Music released on Audio Company. The song "Mava Mava" was remixed in Big Boss (1995) and Anveshana.

S. No	Song title	Lyrics	Singers	length
1	"Emandoi Srivaaru"	Arudra	P. Susheela	3:51
2	"Nannu Vadhali Neevu Polevule"	Dasaradhi	Ghantasala, P. Susheela	4:17
3	"Mava Mava Mava"	Kosaraju	Ghantasala, K. Jamuna Rani	3:55
4	"Oho Oho Paavurama"	Atreya	S. Janaki	3:38
5	"Silalapai Silpaalu Chekkinaru"	Atreya	Ghantasala	5:08
6	"Thyaagam Idhiyena"	Sri Sri	P. Susheela	3:33
7	"Entha Takkari Vaadu"	Kosaraju	K. Jamuna Rani	3:37
