= Jwaar Bhata =

- Poster
- Directed by: Adurthi Subba Rao
- Written by: Rajendra Krishan
- Based on: Dagudu Moothalu (Telugu)
- Produced by: Hargobind Duggal
- Starring: Dharmendra; Saira Banu; Sujit Kumar; Nazir Hussain
- Cinematography: P.L. Rai
- Edited by: G.G. Krishna Rao
- Music by: Laxmikant–Pyarelal
- Production company: Roop Tara Studios
- Distributed by: Bahar Films Combines
- Release date: 1973
- Country: India
- Language: Hindi

Jwaar Bhata (transl. High and low tides) is a 1973 Indian Hindi film. Produced by Hargobind and N. Bhansali, the film stars Dharmendra, Saira Banu, Jeevan, Rajindernath and Sujit Kumar. The film's music is by Laxmikant Pyarelal. The film was a remake of Telugu film Dagudu Moothalu.

== Plot ==
Widowed and wealthy Durgadas Prasad is the sole owner of Shriman Mills. He has one son, who falls in love with a woman from a poor family. This disappoints Durgadas and he asks his son to leave. His son leaves, gets married, and soon has a son. Durgadas's son and daughter in law do not live for long, leaving a son Biloo who is looked after by a restaurant owner who also dies leaving his three small daughters and his restaurant in the care of Biloo. Gayatri who runs away from home due to a forced marriage to an old man by her step Mom, takes shelter at Biloo's house. Durgadas is much more older and not expected to live long. Gayatri approaches him for a job at the mill he owns, He recruits her as his secretary. When his relatives insist that he adopt his distant nephew, Anokhey, he agrees, only to have Gayatri bring home Billoo, who she has figured out is Durgdas’s grandson. Durgadas is jubilant when he verifies that Billoo is indeed his grandson and throws a grand party. After the party, Durgadas dies, leaving everything in Billoo's hands. Billoo changes his name to Balraj and starts to look after his grandfather's business. Durgadas's relatives, Iqbal Nath, his daughter, Rekha; a cousin, Satwani, and her son, Anokhey; along with Advocate Ramesh Khanna, conspire with each other and concoct a plan — a plan so devious that will not only entrap Billoo and Gayatri in it — but also make them loathe the day they met Durgadas.

== Cast ==
- Dharmendra as Balraj Prasad "Billoo"
- Saira Banu as Gayatri
- Sujit Kumar as Advocate Ramesh Khanna
- Jeevan as Iqbal
- Nazir Hussain as Durgadas Prasad
- Sunder as Pandit Shiv Shankar
- Rajendra Nath as Anokhelal
- Shammi as Satwanti
- Jayshree T. as Courtesan Phool Kumari
- Meena T. as Rekha Nath (Iqbal's daughter)
- Baby Guddi
- Baby Pinky
- Sabina as (as Baby Sabira)
- Randhir as Gayatri's Father
- Sulochana Chateejee as Gayatri s step mom
- Shivraj as Dr. Shivraj

== Soundtrack ==
All songs are written by Rajinder Krishan.

#	Title	Singer(s)
1	"Tera Mera Pyar Shuru"	Kishore Kumar
2	"Daal Roti Khao Prabhu Ke Gun Gaao"	Kishore Kumar, Lata Mangeshkar
3	"Rootha Hai To"	Lata Mangeshkar, Shivangi Kolhapure
4	"Hoton Pe Tera Naam"	Asha Bhosle
5	"Peene Ki Der Hai Na Pilane Ki"	Asha Bhosle
