= Maro Prapancham =

- Theatrical release poster
- Directed by: Adurthi Subba Rao
- Written by: Modukuri Johnson (dialogues)
- Screenplay by: K. Viswanath
- Story by: B. S. Thapa
- Produced by: Akkineni Nageswara Rao; Adurthi Subba Rao
- Starring: Akkineni Nageswara Rao; Savitri; Jamuna
- Cinematography: K. S. Ramakrishna Rao
- Edited by: B. Gopala Rao; Adurthi Haranath
- Music by: K. V. Mahadevan
- Production company: Chakravarthi Chitra
- Release date: 10 April 1970
- Running time: 153 mins
- Country: India
- Language: Telugu

Maro Prapancham (transl. Another World) is a 1970 Telugu-language film, produced by Akkineni Nageswara Rao and Adurthi Subba Rao under the Chakravarthy Chitra banner and directed by Adurthi Subba Rao. It stars Akkineni Nageswara Rao, Savitri, Jamuna and music composed by K. V. Mahadevan.

== Cast ==
- Akkineni Nageswara Rao as CBI Officer Ravindra Nath
- Savitri as Sarada
- Jamuna as Bharata Maata
- Gummadi as I.G. Jagannatha Rao
- Padmanabham
- Sakshi Ranga Rao as Sanyasi Rao
- Mada as Peda Gandhi
- Vijayachander
- Venkateswara Rao as Narasimha Rao
- Suryakantham
- Pushpa Kumari as Rukmini
- Radha Kumari as Godavari
- Meena Kumari

== Crew ==
- Art: G. V. Subba Rao
- Choreography: Venu Gopal
- Dialogues: Modukuri Johnson
- Lyrics: Sri Sri
- Playback: S. P. Balasubrahmanyam, S. Janaki
- Music: K. V. Mahadevan
- Story: B. S. Thapa
- Screenplay: K. Viswanath
- Editing: B. Gopala Rao, Adurthi Haranath
- Cinematography: K. S. Ramakrishna Rao
- Producer: Akkineni Nageswara Rao, Adurthi Subba Rao
- Director: Adurthi Subba Rao
- Banner: Chakravarthi Chitra
- Release Date: 10 April 1970

== Soundtrack ==
Maro Prapancham

Film score by K. V. Mahadevan
- Released: 1970
- Genre: Soundtrack
- Producer: K. V. Mahadevan

K. V. Mahadevan chronology
Akka Chellelu (1970)	Maro Prapancham (1970)	Petthamdaarlu (1970)

Music composed by K. V. Mahadevan.

S. No	Song title	Lyrics	Singers	length
1	"Idigo Idigo"	Sri Sri	S. P. Balasubrahmanyam, S. Janaki	4:04
2	"Annagarina Brathukulo"	Sri Sri	S. P. Balasubrahmanyam, S. Janaki	

== Other ==
- VCDs and DVDs on - VOLGA Videos, Hyderabad
