= Thalli Prema =

- Theatrical release poster
- Directed by: Srikanth
- Written by: Bhamidipati Radhakrishna (dialogues)
- Screenplay by: Srikanth
- Story by: M. Azam
- Produced by: M. Azam
- Starring: N. T. Rama Rao; Savitri; Ram Mohan
- Cinematography: E. N. Balakrishna
- Edited by: R. M. Venu
- Music by: R. Sudarshanam
- Production company: Azam Arts
- Release date: 9 March 1968
- Running time: 146 mins
- Country: India
- Language: Telugu

Thalli Prema (transl. Mother's Love) is a 1968 Telugu-language drama film, written and produced by M. Azam under the Azam Arts banner and directed by Srikanth. It stars N. T. Rama Rao, Savitri, and Ram Mohan with music composed by Sudarshanam. The film was remade in Tamil as Kulama Gunama (1971), in Hindi as Swarag Se Sunder (1986) and again in Telugu as Naa Ille Naa Swargam (1991).

Original movie is Kudumbam (1967), M Assam produced and written by Thoppil Bhasi. The background is the emergence of cooperative service societies in communist movement in Kerala. This operates in the villages to rescue farmers from the clutches of traders. Protagonist in the movie is the cooperative society president. After the success of this movie M Asam remade this movie in Telugu and Kulamo gulanoin Tamil.

== Cast ==
- N. T. Rama Rao as Kesava Rao
- Savitri as Seeta
- Relangi as Major Kailasam
- Ram Mohan as Venu
- Nagabhushanam as Viswaroopam
- Padmanabham as Vajram
- K. V. Chalam as Chalamaiah
- Kanchana as Lalitha
- Geetanjali as Vimala
- Chaya Devi as Bhadramma

== Soundtrack ==
Thalli Prema

Film score by Sudarshanam
- Released: 1968
- Genre: Soundtrack
- Length: 23:30
- Producer: Sudarshanam

Music composed by Sudarshanam. Music released by Audio Company.

S. No.	Song title	Lyrics	Singers	length
1	"Komma Meedi Koyilamma"	Dasaradhi	P. Susheela	3:34
2	"Ledaa Ledaa"	C. Narayana Reddy	P. Susheela, P. B. Srinivas	3:28
3	"Ninna Monna"	C. Narayana Reddy	P. Susheela, P. B. Srinivas	3:22
4	"Kalalo Ilalo"	Dasaradhi	P. Susheela, P. Leela	3:39
5	"Hello Hello Doragaru"	Kosaraju	Pithapuram, L. R. Eswari	4:02
6	"Veedhi Natakam"	Kosaraju	Pithapuram, L. R. Eswari	4:20
7	"Talli Ninnu Talanchi"	P. Tyagaraju	P. B. Srinivas	1:05
