= Pooja Ke Phool =

- Theatrical poster
- Directed by: A. Bhimsingh
- Written by: K. S. Gopalakrishnan (story); Rajendra Krishan (dialogue)
- Based on: Kumudham (Tamil)
- Produced by: A. V. Meiyappan
- Starring: Ashok Kumar; Dharmendra; Mala Sinha; Nimmi; Sandhya Roy; Pran
- Cinematography: G. Vittal Rao
- Edited by: A. Paul Dorai Singham
- Music by: Madan Mohan
- Release date: 1964
- Country: India
- Language: Hindi

Pooja Ke Phool (lit. 'Flowers for the puja') is a 1964 Indian Hindi-language movie. Produced by A. V. Meiyappan and directed by Bhimsingh, the film stars Ashok Kumar, Dharmendra, Mala Sinha, Nimmi, Sandhya Roy and Pran in pivotal roles. The film's music was composed by Madan Mohan. This is a remake of the Tamil film Kumudham.

== Plot ==
Balraj (Dharmendra), affectionately called Raj by his elder brother (Nana Palsikar) and niece Vija (Sandhyaroy), is a student in college in the arts semester. As the family is not very rich, Raj decides to move from the hostel to the residence of a family. He finds one such family in Gandhinagar, which consists of Choudhury Hukumat Rai (Ashok Kumar), a lawyer by profession, his wife (Sulochana Chatterjee) and only daughter Shanti (Mala Sinha). Hukumat takes an instant liking to Raj, and tells him that his wife will only allow him to take up residence if he tells her that he is already married. Raj reluctantly does so, and thus acquires residence with the Rai family. Eventually, Mrs. Rai takes a liking to Raj and so does Shanti. Shanti finds out Raj and her dad had lied to the family about Raj's marital status, she confronts Raj, and he readily admits that he lied. Both fall in love. Mr. and Mrs. Rai are thrilled, when they come to know that Raj and Shanti are in love, and excitedly plan their marriage. As Raj's brother is critically ill, Raj has to return to his village. After several days when Raj returns to the Rai family, he refuses to marry Shanti on the grounds that he is going to marry Gauri (Nimmi), the blind sister of Balam Singh (Pran), whom his sister loves. The Rai family is devastated. And then they find out that then Raj has been arrested for killing someone.

== Cast ==
- Ashok Kumar as Choudhary Hukumat Rai
- Dharmendra as Balraj "Raj"
- Mala Sinha as Shanti Rai
- Nimmi as Gauri
- Sandhya Roy as Vija
- Pran as Balam Singh
- Nana Palsikar as Hansraj (Balraj's Brother)
- Mohan Choti as Katpatiya
- Shivraj as Mr. Singh (Balam's Father)
- Mukri as Kisaan
- Sulochana Chatterjee as Mrs. Laxmi Hukumat Rai
- Leela Chitnis as Mrs. Singh (Balam's Mother)
- Kammo as Bela: Balam's girlfriend (Dead)
- Madhumati as dancer

== Soundtrack ==
Music was composed by Madan Mohan, and lyrics was written by Rajinder Krishan.

Song	Singer
"Pehle Meri Aankhon Ke"	Lata Mangeshkar
"Meow Meow Meri Sakhi"	Lata Mangeshkar
"Meri Aankhon Se Koi"	Lata Mangeshkar
"Dil Todna Kisi Ka....zara thehar tujhe samjhaoon"	Lata Mangeshkar
"Banda Parwar"	Asha Bhosle
"Ab Do Dilon Ki Mushkil Aasan Ho Gayi Hai"	Asha Bhosle, Mohammed Rafi
"Hey Jamaalo, O Baba, Hey Jamaalo"	Asha Bhosle, Mohammed Rafi
"Sanam Apni Palkon Pe Tujhko"	Mohammed Rafi
"Do Ghadi Saath Rahe"	Mohammed Rafi
