= Avan Pithana? =

- Poster
- Directed by: P. Neelakantan
- Screenplay by: M. Karunanidhi
- Based on: Dagudu Moothalu
- Produced by: R. Periyanayagam; S. P. Karupaiah; P. Angamuthu
- Starring: S. S. Rajendran; C. R. Vijayakumari
- Cinematography: T. M. Sundara Babu
- Music by: R. Parthasarathi
- Production company: Umayal Productions
- Release date: 29 April 1966
- Country: India
- Language: Tamil

Avan Pithana? (transl. Is He Mad?) is a 1966 Indian Tamil-language comedy drama film directed by P. Neelakantan, produced by R. Periyanayagam and written by M. Karunanidhi. It is a remake of the Telugu film Dagudu Moothalu (1964). The film stars S. S. Rajendran, C. R. Vijayakumari, S. V. Sahasranamam, T. S. Balaiah and T. P. Muthulakshmi. It was released on 29 April 1966.

== Plot ==
Nallaiah, a wealthy industrialist, discovers his son intends to marry an impoverished woman, causing Nallaiah to disown him. The son and wife die separately, leaving their son Kumar destitute. A couple running a tea shop adopt Kumar and raise him as their own. One day, Kumar offers the shop as shelter to a young woman named Gomathi. He later gets her a job as Nallaiah's nurse, unaware of his own relation. Nallaiah is ill and shows regret over his decision to disown his son. Nallaiah gives Gomathi access to his safe as a sign of trust. When Nallaiah dies, this leads to a war over his property. Two miscreants forge Nallaiah's will to give themselves inheritance, but Kumar is able to prove that he is Nallaiah's grandson and receives the inheritance.

== Cast ==
- S. S. Rajendran as Kumar
- C. R. Vijayakumari as Gomathi
- S. V. Sahasranamam as Nallaiah
- T. S. Balaiah and T. P. Muthulakshmi as miscreants
- Nagesh as Chinnaya
- Sachu as Sasi
- Udaya Chandrika
- A. Karunanidhi
- Pakoda Kadhar

== Production ==
Avan Pithana? was directed by P. Neelakantan and produced by R. Periyanayagam, S. P. Karupaiah and P. Angamuthu under Umayal Productions. It was remade from the Telugu film Dagudu Moothalu (1964), with M. Karunanidhi writing the remake, while T. M. Sundara Babu handled the cinematography. The final length of the film was 4,379 metres (14,367 ft).

== Soundtrack ==
The soundtrack was composed by R. Parthasarathi.

Track listing
| No. | Title | Lyrics | Singer(s) | Length |
|---|---|---|---|---|
| 1. | "Iraivan Irukkindrana" | Kannadasan | T. M. Soundararajan, P. Susheela | 5:19 |
| 2. | "Kizhakku Veluthathadi" | Kannadasan | T. M. Soundararajan, P. Susheela | 3:31 |
| 3. | "Aayiram Mutham" | Trichy Thiyagarajan | T. M. Soundararajan, P. Susheela | 3:11 |
| 4. | "Maapillai Manasukku" | M. K. Athmanathan | P. Susheela | 3:31 |
| 5. | "Aandavan Padaippil" | Kannadasan | L. R. Eswari | 3:23 |
| Total length: | | | | 18:55 |

== Release and reception ==
Avan Pithana? was released on 29 April 1966. Kalki praised it for the performances of Rajendran, Vijayakumari and Balaiah, but felt Nagesh could have been better utilised.
