= Kumudham =

- Theatrical release poster
- Directed by: Adurthi Subba Rao
- Written by: K. S. Gopalakrishnan
- Produced by: T. R. Sundaram
- Starring: S. S. Rajendran; Vijayakumari; Sowcar Janaki
- Cinematography: R. Sampath
- Edited by: L. Balu
- Music by: K. V. Mahadevan
- Production company: Modern Theatres
- Release date: 29 July 1961
- Running time: 154 minutes
- Country: India
- Language: Tamil

Kumudham is a 1961 Indian Tamil-language film, directed by Adurthi Subba Rao and written by K. S. Gopalakrishnan. The film stars S. S. Rajendran, Vijayakumari and Sowcar Janaki, in the titular role. It was released on 29 July 1961 and became a commercial success, later receiving the Certificate of Merit for Third Best Feature Film at 9th National Film Awards. The film was remade in Telugu as Manchi Manasulu (1962), in Malayalam as Susheela (1963) and in Hindi as Pooja Ke Phool (1964).

== Plot ==
In Vandalur, Chithambaram, a blacksmith is living with his daughter Anjalai and brother Kumaran. Chithambaram sends Kumaran to Madras for his college studies and works hard to send money for his stay there. He becomes seriously ill with tuberculosis and Kumaran learns of this. To relieve his brother's burden, he tries to move into a less expensive lodging. A Public Prosecutor, who instantly likes his good behaviour offers a portion of his house for a very low rent. To convince his wife, he states that Kumaran is married. However, his daughter Shanthi finds out from Kumaran's diary that he is not married and starts liking him. Kumaran also falls in love with her and Shanthi's father and mother, on knowing the truth that he is single, give consent and decide to get them married.

Anjalai falls in love with Kasilingam, a ruffian with a blind sister Kumudham. Kasilingam also has a relationship with Mallika (Mohana) from Bangalore, who keeps sending money for his expenses every month, which he spends lavishly. Kasilingam's parents are worried about the wayward behaviour of him and also about their blind daughter, whom no one is willing to marry.

Chithambaram becomes seriously ill and Kumaran receives a telegram. He rushes with Shanthi and her parents. When Chithambaram learns that Kumaran will marry Shanthi and live in Chennai, he worries about his daughter Anjalai and how much he thought about his brother's welfare and not the daughter's all along. That's when Kumaran accepts the responsibility to take care of Anjalai. Chithambaram takes a promise from Kumaran to protect Anjalai like his own daughter and then dies. Kumaran is unable to move to Chennai because of the promise.

One day. Kumaran finds out that Anjalai is in love with Kasilingam and he disapproves. But Anjalai requests and in order to fulfill his vow to his brother, he goes to meet Kasilingam's parents. They agree to the alliance, provided Kumaran marries their blind daughter Kumdham. Kumaran is shocked and finally agrees for Anjalai's sake.

Kumaran goes to Chennai and explains the situation to Shanthi and her parents. She is upset but accepts. Both the marriages take place. Kumaran disturbed about spoiling Shanthi's life and does not lead a happy life with Kumudham. One day Shanthi lands up at the village, sees the situation and makes Kumaran realise his mistake. Soon, Kumaran and Kumudham start living a happy life. Shanthi keeps visiting them regularly and Kumudham realises that it is she, whom Kumaran sacrificed to marry her. Her respect for Shanthi goes up further. Kumaran takes Kumudham to Mahabalipuram for a holiday.

In the meanwhile, Kasilingam's lady love Mallika arrives from Bangalore and learns of his marriage with Anjalai. Kasilingam takes her to Mahabalipuram and tries to explain. Mallika shows his love letters and threatens to expose him. When he does not budge, she tries to kill him with a knife. He manages to overpower her, stabs her and throws her from the hilltop. Kumaran and Kumudham hear the cry and find the dead body of Mallika and Kasilingam running away. He understands the truth and now is in a predicament, whether to expose Kasilingam or not. Because of his promise to take care of Anjalai, he takes the blame for the murder. Both Shanthi and Kumudham are shocked and plead with him but Kumaran is adamant and accepts the act of murder in the court.

The Public Prosecutor is Shanthi's father and Shanthi dons the robes to argue against her father. Step by step she dismantles the case against Kumaran. However, in the absence of any evidence, the court is yet to come to a conclusion. One night, in a drunken state, Kasilingam reveals that it was he who killed Mallika. Anajalai overhears this and to protect her innocent uncle, searches and locates the love letters of Mallika to Kasilingam and hands them over to Shanthi to fight the case. Shanthi shows them in court, but they are not considered as evidence for the murder.

Kasilingam gets angry with Anajalai, beats her and dumps her in a temple, where he has hidden the clothing he has worn during the killing and the knife used to kill Mallika. Anjalai finds them while appealing to the goddess. With great difficulty, she reaches the court and hands over the evidences. Kumudham also confirms that the person who stamped her feet while rushing out of the murder spot was Kasilingam, guilty. Realising the way everyone is working for truth and fairness including his wife, Kasilingam reforms and apologises for his mistakes to Anjalai. Finally, Kumaran is acquitted and unites with Kumudham. Shanthi goes back to her life with her parents.

== Cast ==
Male cast

- S. S. Rajendran as Kumaran
- S. V. Ranga Rao as the Public Prosecutor
- M. R. Radha as Kasilingam
- T. S. Muthaiah as Chithambaram
- Rama Rao as Poosari
- C. S. Pandiyan
- P. D. Sambandam as Kumudham and Kasilingam's father
- Sairam

Female cast

- Vijayakumari as Shanthi
- Sowcar Janaki as Kumudham
- B. S. Saroja as Anjalai
- Sundari Bai as Shanthi's mother
- Mohana as Mallika
- Seethalakshmi as Kumudham and Kasilingam's mother

== Soundtrack ==
The music was composed by K. V. Mahadevan . The songs, particularly "Mama Mama", "Kallile Kalai" and "Ennaivittu" were well received. "Kallile Kalai", which was shot at Mahabalipuram, is set in Jaunpuri raga.

Song	Singers	Lyrics	Length
"Kallile Kalai Vannam Kandaaan"	Seerkazhi Govindarajan	Kannadasan	03:09
"Nil Angey"	P. Susheela	Kannadasan	03:24
"Maamaa Maamaa Maamaa"	T. M. Soundararajan, K. Jamuna Rani	A. Maruthakasi	05:39
"Ennai Vittu Odipoga Mudiyumaa"	Seerkazhi Govindarajan, P. Susheela	A. Maruthakasi	03:21
"Miyaaw Miyaaw Poonai Kutti"	M. S. Rajeswari		02:57
"Kalyanam Aanavare Soukkiyamaa"	P. Susheela	Kannadasan	03:26
"Kaayame Idhu Poiyadaa"	T. M. Soundararajan & A. L. Raghavan		03:39
"Nil Ange... Ennamum Idhayamum"	P. Susheela		03:36

== Reception ==
The film become a box office success and ran for over 100 days in theatres. It won the Certificate of Merit for Third Best Film in Tamil for the year 1961.

== Bibliography ==
- Dhananjayan, G. (2014). Pride of Tamil Cinema: 1931–2013. Blue Ocean Publishers. OCLC 898765509.
