= Badi Panthulu =

- Theatrical release poster
- Directed by: P. Chandrasekhara Reddy
- Written by: D. V. Narasa Raju (dialogues)
- Screenplay by: P. Chandrasekhara Reddy
- Story by: Sirvaadkar
- Produced by: P. Perraju
- Starring: N. T. Rama Rao; Anjali Devi
- Cinematography: K. S. Prasad
- Edited by: V. Anki Reddy
- Music by: K. V. Mahadevan
- Production company: Triveni Productions
- Release date: 22 November 1972
- Running time: 165 minutes
- Country: India
- Language: Telugu

Badi Panthulu (transl. School Teacher) is a 1972 Indian Telugu-language drama film, produced by P. Perraju under the Triveni Productions banner and directed by P. Chandrasekhara Reddy. It stars N. T. Rama Rao and Anjali Devi, with music composed by K. V. Mahadevan. It is a remake of the Kannada film School Master (1958) by B. R. Panthulu. The film was released on 22 November 1972 and became a commercial success, with Rama Rao winning the Filmfare Award for Best Actor – Telugu.

== Cast ==
- N. T. Rama Rao as Head Master Raghava Rao
- Anjali Devi as Janaki
- Krishnam Raju as Venu
- Ramakrishna as Satyam
- Jaggayya as Ramu
- Nagabhushanam as Papa Rao
- Allu Ramalingaiah as Panakalu
- Raja Babu as Pichaiah
- Mikkilineni as Collector
- Dr. Sivaramakrishnaiah as Doctor
- Raavi Kondala Rao as Kanthaiah
- Suryakantham as Rajamma
- Sowcar Janaki as Radha
- Vijayalalitha as Jaya
- Jayanthi as Shanthi
- Radha Kumari as Panakalu's wife
- T. Padmini as Lakshmi
- Master Adinarayana as Young Ramu
- Baby Sridevi as Raghava Rao's granddaughter

== Production ==
Badi Panthulu is a remake of the 1958 Kannada film School Master (1958), itself based on the Marathi novel Vaishnavi by Kusumagraj.

== Soundtrack ==
Badi Panthulu

Film score by K. V. Mahadevan
- Released: 1972
- Genre: Soundtrack
- Length: 30:41
- Producer: K. V. Mahadevan

K. V. Mahadevan chronology
Illu Illalu (1972)	Badi Panthulu (1972)	Dabbuki Lokam Dasoham (1973)

Music composed by K. V. Mahadevan.

S. No	Song title	Lyrics	Singers	length
1	"Bharata Mataku Jejelu"	Acharya Aatreya	Ghantasala	3:25
2	"Pillalamu Badi Pillalamu"	Acharya Aatreya	P. Susheela	3:03
3	"Ninna Monna"	Acharya Aatreya	Ghantasala, P. Susheela	3:16
4	"Olammo Oliyo"	C. Narayana Reddy	P. Susheela	2:52
5	"Mee Nagumonu"	Acharya Aatreya	P. Susheela	3:57
6	"Orori Pillagada"	Acharya Aatreya	S. P. Balasubrahmanyam, P. Susheela	3:31
7	"Yeda Baatu Yerugani"	Dasaradhi	Ghantasala	3:28
8	"Raka Raka Vachavu"	Aarudhra	S. P. Balasubrahmanyam, P. Susheela	3:40
9	"Boochaadammaa Boochaadu"	Acharya Aatreya	P. Susheela	3:29

== Release and reception ==
Badi Panthulu was released on 22 November 1972 and was a commercial success. For his performance, Rama Rao won the Filmfare Award for Best Actor – Telugu.
