= Nammina Bantu =

- Theatrical release poster
- Directed by: Adurthi Subba Rao
- Written by: Sunkara Satyanarayana; Tapi Dharma Rao (dialogues)
- Screenplay by: Adurthi Subba Rao
- Story by: Sunkara Satyanarayana
- Produced by: Yarlagadda Venkanna Chowdary
- Starring: Akkineni Nageswara Rao; Savitri
- Cinematography: B. S. Jagirdhar
- Edited by: A. Sanjeevi
- Music by: S. Rajeswara Rao; Master Venu
- Production company: Sambhu Films
- Distributed by: Navayuga Films
- Release date: 7 January 1960
- Running time: 161 minutes
- Country: India
- Languages: Telugu; Tamil

Nammina Bantu (transl. Trusted servant) is a 1960 Indian Telugu-language drama film directed by Adurthi Subba Rao. It stars Akkineni Nageswara Rao, S. V. Ranga Rao, and Savitri, with music jointly composed by S. Rajeswara Rao and Master Venu. The film was simultaneously made in Tamil as Pattaliyin Vetri (transl. The Proletariat's success), under the same banner and director, and some of the scenes and artists are the same in both versions. Upon release Nammina Bantu received critical acclaim. The film was featured at the 8th San Sebastián International Film Festival. The film won the National Film Award for Best Feature Film in Telugu.

== Cast ==
Telugu version

- Akkineni Nageswara Rao as Prasad
- Savitri as Lakshmi
- S. V. Ranga Rao as Chandrayya
- Gummadi as Zamindar Bhujanga Rao
- Relangi as Devayya
- Chadalavada as Surayya
- Hemalata as Kanakamma
- Girija as Sarala
- E. V. Saroja as Dancer
- Lanka Satyam

Tamil version

- Akkineni Nageswara Rao as Kannan
- Savitri as Lakshmi
- S. V. Ranga Rao as Paramasiva
- T. S. Balaiah as Sivam
- K. A. Thangavelu as Ranga
- K. Sarangapani
- P. D. Sambandam as Singaram
- Girija as Chandra
- E. V. Saroja as Dancer
- K. R. Chellam
- K. N. Kamalam

== Soundtrack ==
Nammina Bantu

Film score by S. Rajeswara Rao & Master Venu
- Released: 1960
- Genre: Soundtrack
- Length: 40:53
- Producers: S. Rajeswara Rao & Master Venu

Music composed by S. Rajeswara Rao & Master Venu. Music released on Audio Company. All the tunes for all the songs for both languages are the same.

=== Telugu version ===
Nammina Bantu

Lyrics were written by Kosaraju. Playback singers are Ghantasala, Madhavapeddi Satyam, Jikki, P. Susheela, P. Leela, T. V. Rathnam and Swarnalatha.

S. No	Song title	Singers	Lyrics	Length (mm:ss)	Composer
1	"Pogarubothu Potlagithara"	Ghantasala	Kosaraju	03:15	S. Rajeswara Rao
2	"Thela Thela Vaarenu"	Jikki	Kosaraju	04:22	S. Rajeswara Rao
3	"Chengu Chenguna"	P. Susheela	Kosaraju	03:09	S. Rajeswara Rao
4	"Enta Manchi Vadavura"	Ghantasala & P. Susheela	Kosaraju	03:51	Master Venu
5	"Raitu Medibatti Saagalera Lokam"	Ghantasala & P. Susheela	Kosaraju	03:41	Master Venu
6	"Topi Najooku Techu Topi"	Madhavapeddi Satyam	Kosaraju	03:40	Master Venu
7	"Ghama Ghama Ghamayinchu"	Madhavapeddi Satyam & P. Leela	Kosaraju	04:43	Master Venu
8	"Andala Bomma"	Madhavapeddi Satyam & Jikki	Kosaraju	04:22	Master Venu
9	"Alu Mogudu Pondu Andamoyi"	Swarnalatha, P. Susheela & T. V. Rathnam	Kosaraju	08:38	Master Venu
10	"Maata Paddavura Mechaledu"	Ghantasala	Kosaraju	01:12	Master Venu
11	""	Ghantasala & Jikki	Kosaraju	00:51	Master Venu

Pattaliyin Vetri

Film score by S. Rajeswara Rao & Master Venu
- Released: 1960
- Genre: Soundtrack
- Length: 41:48
- Producers: S. Rajeswara Rao & Master Venu

=== Tamil version ===
Pattaliyin Vetri

Lyrics by Udumalai Narayana Kavi and Ka. Mu. Sheriff. Playback singers are T. M. Soundararajan, Ghantasala, Seerkazhi Govindarajan, S. C. Krishnan, Jikki, P. Susheela, P. Leela, T. V. Rathnam & Swarnalatha.

S. No	Song title	Singers	Lyrics	Length (mm:ss)	Composer
1	"Anna Nadai Thanile"	T. M. Soundararajan	Udumalai Narayana Kavi	03:15	S. Rajeswara Rao
2	"Velli Mulaithathu Vaanile Amma"	Jikki	Udumalai Narayana Kavi	04:22	S. Rajeswara Rao
3	"Chingku Chingkune Thulliye Odunggale"	P. Susheela	Ka. Mu. Sheriff	03:09	S. Rajeswara Rao
4	"Enddanaalume Naame"	Ghantasala & P. Susheela	Udumalai Narayana Kavi	03:51	Master Venu
5	"Uzhavan Munnaalethaan"	T. M. Soundararajan & P. Susheela	Udumalai Narayana Kavi	03:41	Master Venu
6	"Hat Nagaeregamaana Hattu"	Seerkazhi Govindarajan	Udumalai Narayana Kavi	03:40	Master Venu
7	"Gama Gama Gamangkudhu"	Seerkazhi Govindarajan & P. Leela	Udumalai Narayana Kavi	04:43	Master Venu
8	"Singaara Bommai"	S. C. Krishnan & Jikki	Ka. Mu. Sheriff	04:22	Master Venu
9	"Pendatti Purushanukku Piriyaadha Bandhame"	Swarnalatha, P. Susheela & T. V. Rathnam	Udumalai Narayana Kavi	08:38	Master Venu
10	"Manadhaara Oru Pizhaiyum"	T. M. Soundararajan	Ka. Mu. Sheriff	01:12	Master Venu
11	"Paadu Pattu Payir Valartthu"	T. M. Soundararajan & Jikki	Ka. Mu. Sheriff	00:51	Master Venu

== Production ==
Yarlagadda Venkanna Chowdary, who himself was a landlord decided to produce a film based on the theme of exploitation of farmers by landlords written by socialist writer Sunkara Sathyanarayana for his debut production. Adurthi Subbarao was signed on to direct the film, while Sunkara and Tapi Dharma Rao wrote the dialogues. B. S. Jagirdar and Akkineni Sanjeevi worked as cinematographers and editors respectively. The film was simultaneously made in Tamil as Pattaliyin Vetri.

Nageswara Rao and Savitri were selected to portray the lead pair. S. V. Rangarao was first offered the landlord's role, but Rangarao preferred the character of downtrodden farmer Chandrayya's character as he found it more challenging. Dagubati Ramanaidu, who went on to become a popular producer in Telugu cinema worked as one of the partners in the film. The film also happened to be his debut film as an actor. He acted as the body double for Nageswara Rao, driving the bullock cart in long shot scenes, besides donning the district collector's role.

== Award ==
National Film Awards

- 1959: President's silver medal for Best Feature Film in Telugu
