= Rajeswari =

Rajeswari is a given name and surname. Notable people with the name include:

== Given name ==
- Rajeswari Nachiyar (fl. 1979), titular ruler of the estate of Ramnad
- Rajeswari Padmanabhan (1939–2008), Indian artist
- Rajeswari Sunder Rajan (born 1950), Indian feminist scholar
- Rajeswari Ray (died 2022), Indian actress
- Rajeswari Vaidyanathan (fl. 2015), Indian dancer
- Raja Rajeswari Setha Raman (born 1961), Malaysian poet

== Surname ==
- M. S. Rajeswari (1932–2018), Indian playback singer
- Raja Rajeswari (fl. 1998), American judge
- Vanthala Rajeswari (born 1981), Indian politician

== See also ==
- Rajeswari Kalyanam, film
