= Patrayani Seetharama Sastry =

Patrayani Seetharama Sastry (also known as Saluru China Guruvu) (b. 1900 - d. 1957) was a singer, teacher and music composer from Andhra Pradesh, India.

He was the son and disciple of Patrayani Venkata Narasimha Sastry. He spent his early life in Berhampur and gave his first performance in a temple and won gold medal. He has composed about 30 kritis. which include Iha para saadhaname -Smruti ranjani and Naada nanda mura - Mukhari.

He taught many singers in Vizianagaram Music college beginning in 1936, when Dwaram Venkataswamy Naidu was the principal. He used to argue against the traditionalists that the harmonium is also a suitable musical instrument for Carnatic music. He was the teacher of Ghantasala, a prominent singer and music director in the Telugu film industry.

Patrayani Seetharama Sastry Music and Dance School was established in Salur.
