= Swarag Se Sunder =

- Theatrical release poster
- Directed by: K. Bapaiah
- Written by: Kader Khan (dialogues)
- Screenplay by: Gyandev Agnihotri; Ravi
- Story by: M. Aazam
- Based on: Thalli Prema by Srikanth
- Produced by: A. Krishna Murthy
- Starring: Jeetendra; Mithun Chakraborty; Jaya Prada; Padmini Kolhapure
- Cinematography: A. Venkat
- Edited by: Waman Bhonsle; Gurudutt Shirali
- Music by: Laxmikant–Pyarelal
- Production company: Tina Films International
- Release date: 28 February 1986
- Running time: 162 minutes
- Country: India
- Language: Hindi

Swarag Se Sunder (transl. More Beautiful than Heaven) is a 1986 Indian Hindi-language drama film, produced by A. Krishna Murthy under the Tinu International Films banner and directed by K. Bapaiah. It stars Jeetendra, Mithun Chakraborty, Jaya Prada, Padmini Kolhapure, and music composed by Laxmikant–Pyarelal. The primary plot of the movie is similar to Meri Bhabhi (1969) directed by Khalid Akhtar. The film is a remake of the Telugu film Thalli Prema. It was one of the highest grossing movies of Hindi films in 1986. It was remakes again in 1991 Telugu as " naa ille na swargam" with casting Super Star Krishna, Rupa gangooli, Ramesh Babu and Divya Bharathi.

== Cast ==
- Jeetendra as Vijay Choudhary
- Mithun Chakraborty as Ravi Choudhary
- Jaya Prada as Laxmi Choudhury
- Padmini Kolhapure as Lalita Choudhary
- Prem Chopra as Pannalal
- Kader Khan as Milawatram
- Asrani as Meowalal Kannu Saraswat
- Satyendra Kapoor as Rahim Chacha
- Bharat Bhushan as Dr. Shiraz
- Shoma Anand
- Aruna Irani as Phoolmati
- Shubha Khote as Bandharlekha
- Neeta Mehta as Dr. Leelavathi
- Kartar Singh Sikh man in the village crowd

== Soundtrack ==
The music for the film was composed by Laxmikant–Pyarelal, and the songs were penned by Anand Bakshi.

Song	Singer
"O Devi Mata Rani, Tune Sab Ki Mani"	Kishore Kumar, Lata Mangeshkar
"Apna Ghar Hai Swarag Se Sunder"	Kishore Kumar, Asha Bhosle
"Woh Din Yaad Karo, Woh Tho"	Kishore Kumar, Asha Bhosle
"Ab Ke Baras Barson Ke Baad"	Kishore Kumar, Asha Bhosle
"Sun Ri Meri Behna, Sun Ri Meri Saheli"	Lata Mangeshkar, Asha Bhosle
