= Anveshana (2002 film) =

2002 Telugu film

- DVD cover
- Directed by: Sagar
- Written by: Sagar
- Produced by: Kamineni Prasad
- Starring: Ravi Teja; Radhika Varma
- Edited by: Nagi Reddy
- Music by: Madhukar
- Production company: Samsritha Films
- Release date: 27 December 2002
- Country: India
- Language: Telugu

Anveshana is a 2002 Indian Telugu-language horror film directed by Sagar. The film stars Ravi Teja and Radhika Varma in the lead roles. This film marks the film debut of Radhika and the music director, Madhukar. The film was released after a two-year delay.

== Plot ==
Prabhakar mysteriously dies after walking on a train track. His brother, Vamsy, suspected that his death is not a suicide, but a planned murder. Vamsy falls in love with Bhavana and they subsequently marry as their horoscope matches. They later find letters addressed to Prabhakar telling him to come to the forest or face consequences. The rest of the story is how Vamsy and Bhavana figure out the truth behind Prabhakar's death.

== Cast ==
- Ravi Teja as Vamsy
- Radhika Varma as Bhavana
- Bose as Prabhakar
- Raghu Babu as Forest guest house attendee
- Jeeva
- Rallapalli as Vamsy's father
- Chinna
- Tirupathi Prakash
- Ananth

== Production ==
The film was initially titled Ksudra. Ravi Teja only shot for two of the five songs since he became busy with other films midway through this film's shoot.

== Soundtrack ==
The songs were composed by Madhukar. The song "Mama Mama Mama Eme Eme Bhama" from Manchi Manasulu (1962) was reused for this film.

All lyrics are written by Kulashekhar and Surendra Krishna.

Track-List
| No. | Title | Lyrics | Singer(s) | Length |
|---|---|---|---|---|
| 1. | "Are Are" | Surendra Krishna | Kausalya | 3:55 |
| 2. | "Mama Mama" | Kulasekhar | Ravi Varma, Lenina | 4:08 |
| 3. | "Nuvve Nenani" | Surendra Krishna | Usha | 5:55 |
| 4. | "Jamu Rathiri" | Kulasekhar | Ramu, Usha | 4:58 |
| 5. | "Paruvala" | Kulasekhar | Ravi Varma | 3:45 |
| Total length: | | | | 22:41 |

== Reception ==
Jeevi of Idlebrain.com gave the film a rating of two out of five and wrote that "The first half of the film provides some entertainment and a few surprise elements. Second half is boring at times". Gudipoodi Srihari of The Hindu wrote that "There is nothing in the character of Vamsi for Raviteja to do anything. But for a new fights it is a drab role. Music composer Madhukar, making debut with this film, appears to be more a sound effects man". A critic from Telugucinema.com panned the film and wrote, "the film is an endless torture to any one who incase wants to see the film".
