= Chowtapalli =

Village in Andhra Pradesh, India

Chowtapalli Paatha Chowtapalli & Kotha Chowtapalli
- Village
- Nickname: Chow
- Interactive map of Chowtapalli
- Location in Gudivada Mandal Krishna Dist Andhra Pradesh, India Chowtapalli (India)
- Coordinates: 16°24′53″N 81°2′40″E
- Country: CHOWTAPALLI India
- State: Andhra Pradesh
- District: Krishna
- Founder: CHOWTAPPA

Government
  - Body: Gudivada Mandal

Population (12/2009)
  - Total: 2,345

Languages
  - Official: Telugu
- Time zone: UTC+5:30 (IST)
- PIN: 521323
- Telephone code: 08674
- Nearest GUDIVADA city: Vijayawada
- Sex ratio: 50:50 ♂/♀
- Literacy: 70%%
- Lok Sabha constituency: Machilipatnam
- Vidhan Sabha constituency: Gudivada
- Civic agency: Gudivada Mandal
- Website: https://www.facebook.com/chowtapalliVillage/

Chowtapalli is a village in Gudivada mandal, Krishna district in the state of Andhra Pradesh in India. North of the village, there is an extended community near the National Highway called Kotha Chowtapalli. The village is well known as the birthplace of the famous singer Ghantasala Venkateswara Rao.

Veteran producer Atluri Pundarikakshai was born on August 19, 1925, in Chowtapalli village. Pundarikakshaiah produced 11 Telugu and Kannada films, including hits such as Sri Krishnavataram, Mahamantri Thimmarusu, Manushullo Devudu, Maavari Manchitanam, Melu Kolupu, and Aradhana. He acted in 35 Telugu and Kannada films. He also provided the story for the Hindi film Udhar Ka Sindur.
