= Ram Mohan (actor) =

Indian actor

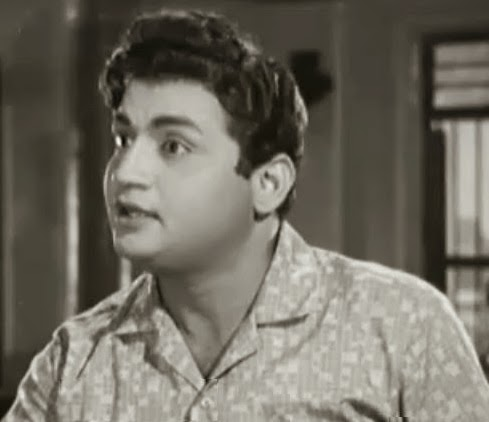
- Born: Varanasi Ram Mohan Rao; 4 February 1939; Giddaluru, Prakasam District, Andhra Pradesh, India
- Died: 2005

Varanasi Ram Mohan Rao (1939-2005) widely known as Ram Mohan was an Indian actor known for his works primarily in Telugu cinema, and few Tamil films. He is featured in more than 25 feature films in a variety of roles, and best known for his work as lead actor in films such as Thene Manasulu (1965), Kanne Manasulu (1966), and Private Master (1967), whilst media described him as Andhra Dev Anand due to his similarities with Bollywood actor Dev Anand. Ram Mohan worked with stalwart directors of the time such as B. N. Reddy, Adurthi Subba Rao, V. Madhusudhana Rao, K. Viswanath, and T. Krishna.

== Personal life and death ==
Ram Mohan was born, 4 February 1939, in Giddaluru, Prakasam District, Andhra Pradesh into a Telugu speaking Brahmin family of Varanasi Rama Rao, and sons. Ram Mohan is second child among eight children. Ram Mohan completed BE degree in Kurnool. Prior to films he worked as Engineering Manager with Hindustan Aeronautics Limited in Bangalore. He died in 2005 due to ill health.

== Selected filmography ==
As Actor

Year	Film	Character
1965	Thene Manasulu	
1966	Kanne Manasulu	
1966	Rangula Ratnam	
1967	Upayamlo Apayam	Ramu
1967	Sudigundalu	
1967	Private Master	
1968	Manchi Kutumbam	Gopi
1968	Thalli Prema	
1968	Evaru Monagadu	Bhaskar
1968	Lakshmi Nivasam	Giri
1969	Sri Rama Katha	Lakshmana
1969	Bhale Abbayilu	Ramu
1970	Pasidi Manasulu	
1971	Vintha Samsaram	Anand, Eldest son of 'Prestige' Padmanabham (Jaggayya)
1971	Kathanayakuralu	Ramesh
1972	Pandanti Kapuram	Mohan
1972	Maa Inti Velugu	Train passenger whom the lead character robs
1972	Muhammad bin Tughluq	
1973	Devudamma	
1973	Srivaru Maavaru	Manager Manikyam
1973	Meena	Madhu
1973	Mayadari Malligadu	Defence Lawyer
1974	Uttama Illalu	Shankar
1974	Alluri Seetarama Raju	Venkatapathi, Sitarama Raju's brother-in-law
1974	Intinti Katha	Gopal
1976	Padi Pantalu	Shankar
1976	Neram Nadi Kadu Akalidhi	Police Officer
1976	Ramarajyamlo Rakthapasam	Inspector 'Sandeha' Sundaram
1978	Mugguru Muggure	Inspector
1978	Lawyer Viswanath	Eye Doctor
1979	Korikale Gurralaithe	Jayalakshmi's affluent neighbour
1979	Srungara Ramudu	Bank Manager Satyanarayana
1989	Rajakeeya Chadarangam	M.L.A
