= Ramalayam =

- Theatrical release poster
- Directed by: K. Babu Rao
- Written by: K. Babu Rao (story); Pinisetty Srirama Murthy (dialogues)
- Produced by: K. A. Prabhakar
- Starring: Jaggayya; Jamuna; Shobhan Babu; Vijaya Nirmala; M. Prabhakar Reddy; V. Nagayya
- Cinematography: Madhava Bulbule
- Edited by: R. Hanumantha Rao
- Music by: Ghantasala; S. Rajeswara Rao
- Release date: 1971
- Country: India
- Language: Telugu

Ramalayam is a 1971 Indian Telugu-language drama film written and directed by K. Babu Rao. The film stars Jaggayya and Shobhan Babu in key roles.

It features a popular song on Hindu deity Rama Jagadabhi Rama Raghukula Soma Saranamu Neeyavaya by Ghantasala.

== Plot ==
The story is about an Indian family of Ramaiah (Jaggaiah) and closely resembles Hindu epic Ramayanam. Ramaiah and Gopi (Shobhan Babu) are brothers. Janaki (Jamuna) is wife of Ramaiah and looks after the home very well. Chitti (Roja Ramani) is their dearly loved sister. They married her into a wealthy family of Kantham (Suryakantham) giving big dowry lending money from Rayudu (Prabhakar Reddy). This leads them to many problems including differences between the family members. Finally their son in law (Chandramohan) and sister helps them solving the problem. The entire family is reunited and live happily.

== Cast ==
Actor / Actress	Character
Jaggayya	Ramaiah
Jamuna	Janaki, wife of Ramaiah
Shobhan Babu	Gopi, younger brother of Ramaiah
Vijaya Nirmala	Radha, wife of Gopi
M. Prabhakar Reddy	Rayudu
V. Nagayya	Temple priest
Allu Ramalingaiah	Village karanam
Suryakantham	Kantham
Chandramohan	Son of Kantham
Roja Ramani	Chitti, sister of Ramaiah

== Soundtrack ==
All music is composed by Ghantasala and S. Rajeswara Rao.

Track listing
No.	Title	Lyrics	Singer(s)	Length
1.	"Chinnari Maradaliki Pellavutundi"	C. Narayana Reddy	S. Janaki, Jikki	4:04
2.	"Jagadabhi Rama Raghukula Soma"	Dasarathi	Ghantasala	5:08
3.	"Mamuganna Tallira Bhoodevi"	Srirangam Srinivasarao	Ghantasala	3:52
4.	"Yenduku Bidiyam Chittemma"	C. Narayana Reddy	S. P. Balasubrahmanyam, L. R. Eswari	4:24
5.	"Yevariki Dorakani Ee Andam"	Dasarathi	L. R. Eswari	3:40
6.	"Go Go Go Gopala Ko Ko Ko Kopala"	-	L. R. Eswari	2:23
7.	"Ila Ila Raaye Ninnidici Ne Nundalenu"	-	S. P. Balasubrahmanyam, L. R. Eswari	3:04
8.	"Madana Madana Madana Yanuchunu Kadalaleka"	-	L. R. Eswari	1:45
