= Adurthi Subba Rao =

Indian film director (1922–1975)

- Born: 16 December 1922; Rajahmundry, Andhra Pradesh, India
- Died: 1 October 1975 (aged 52); Madras, Tamil Nadu, India
- Education: St. Xavier's College, Mumbai
- Occupations: Film director; screenwriter; producer; editor
- Spouse: Kameswari Bala
- Awards: Seven National Film Awards; Nandi Awards; Filmfare Awards South

Adurthi Subba Rao (16 December 1922 – 1 October 1975) was an Indian film director, screenwriter, producer, and editor, primarily recognized for his contributions to Telugu cinema, with a few works in Hindi and Tamil cinema. In an era dominated by mythological and fantasy genres, Subba Rao was a trailblazer in introducing social dramas and contemporary narratives to Telugu cinema. Over his career, he won seven National Film Awards and three Nandi Awards.

Subba Rao began his cinematic career as an associate to Uday Shankar in the 1948 Hindi film Kalpana. He made his directorial debut with Amara Sandesam (1954), a film that, although critically acclaimed, did not achieve commercial success. His next film Thodi Kodallu (1957), which starred Akkineni Nageswara Rao, was a major hit. It led to a long and successful collaboration between the two, resulting in 16 more films together. Following this success, Subba Rao directed several acclaimed films, including Mangalya Balam (1959), and Nammina Bantu (1960), the latter of which was screened at the San Sebastián International Film Festival.

Other notable films, such as Velugu Needalu (1961), Manchi Manasulu (1962), and Doctor Chakravarthy (1964) further solidified his reputation as a leading filmmaker. In 1964, he directed Mooga Mansulu, one of the earliest Telugu films to explore the theme of reincarnation. The film was a significant success and was screened at the Karlovy Vary International Film Festival. His 1965 film Thene Manasulu, made with a cast of newcomers, became a runaway success, marking Krishna's first lead role and introducing Ram Mohan to Telugu cinema. In 1968, he ventured into courtroom drama with Sudigundalu, a film noted for its "film with a key" narrative, which received special mentions at the Tashkent and Moscow Film Festivals.

Several of Subba Rao's films, including Thodi Kodallu (1957), Mangalya Balam (1959), Nammina Bantu (1960), Mooga Manasulu (1964), Doctor Chakravarthy (1964), and Sudigundalu (1968), won the National Film Award for Best Telugu Feature Film. Additionally, his Tamil film Kumudham (1961) won the National Film Award for Best Tamil Feature Film. K. Viswanath, who would later become a celebrated filmmaker, worked as an associate director under Subba Rao before making his own directorial debut. In recognition of Subba Rao's contributions to cinema, the Telugu Film Chamber of Commerce instituted the Adurthi Subba Rao Award in his honour.

== Early life ==
Adurthi Subba Rao was born to Sathanna Panthulu and Rajalakshmamma on 16 December 1912 in Rajahmundry. His father was a Revenue Department official. He completed school final (Matriculation) at the age of 14. He joined Kakinada PR College to do his Pre-University Course. As a college student, he developed a passion for photography and films. Defying his father, he went to Bombay with the little money he had given him. He joined the St. Xavier's College there in a three-year course of photography, but abandoned it halfway and joined a film studio lab printing department.

== Career ==
=== Early career ===
Subba Rao then worked in the processing and printing department of Bombay Film Lab. Then he joined film editor Dina Narvekar as his assistant. He started his film career as a cinematographer, editor and screenwriter. His started as an assistant director and later became the editor for Uday Shankar on his Hindi film Kalpana (1948). His debut film as an editor was Tamil film Parijatapaharanam. He also worked as a writer penning stories, dialogues, and lyrics. Some of the films he wrote were Vanarani (1946), Mangalasootram, Oka Roju Raju (1944), Circus Raju, etc.

Later, he moved to Prakash Studios as an editor but also worked in other departments. K. S. Prakash Rao let him direct some parts in his films such as Deeksha (1951), Kanna Talli (1953) and Baalanandam (1954) for Prakash Studios. He also worked for C. Pullayya's Sankranthi (1952) as editor at the same time.

=== Directorial debut and breakthrough ===
Subba Rao debuted as a director with Amara Sandesam (1954) which was critically acclaimed but not commercially successful. After watching the film, Akkineni Nageswara Rao recommended him to his friend and business partner in Annapurna Pictures, Dukkipati Madhusudhana Rao, who gave Subba Rao the chance to direct the film Thodi Kodallu (1957), adapted from Sarat Chandra Chatterjee's Bengali novel Nishkruti. It became a super hit. The film won the Certificate of merit for Best Feature Film in Telugu.

In 1959, he directed romantic drama Mangalya Balam. Subba Rao adapted Mangalya Balam to the Telugu screen from the Bengali film Agni Pariksha (1954), The Telugu version was simultaneously shot in Tamil as Manjal Mahimai; both versions became box office successes. The former winning the National Film Award for Best Feature Film in Telugu, and the Filmfare Award for Best Film – Telugu in 1960.

The 1960 film Nammina Bantu was simultaneously shot in Tamil as Pattaliyin Vetri. Upon release both versions received critical acclaim. The Telugu work was screened at the San Sebastián International Film Festival. The film also won the National Film Award for Best Feature Film in Telugu for that year.

In 1961, he directed Kumudham written by K. S. Gopalakrishnan. Kumudham was released on 29 July 1961 with final reel length of 4,501 metres (14,767 ft) and became a commercial success at box office. The film received Certificate of Merit for Third Best Feature Film at 9th National Film Awards. It was remade by Subba Rao himself in Telugu as Manchi Manasulu (1962).

Subba Rao's next work was Mooga Mansulu (1964) based on the concept of reincarnation. The film was remade in Hindi as Milan (1967) directed by Subba Rao himself, while the Tamil Praptham (1971) was remade from Subba Rao's work. The Telugu version received the National Film Award for Best Feature Film in Telugu, and the Filmfare Best Film Award (Telugu) in 1964 and was screened at the Karlovy Vary International Film Festival.

The 1964 film Doctor Chakravarthy, an adaptation of the novel Chakrabhramanam, was awarded the National Film Award for Best Feature Film in Telugu, and the state Nandi Award for that year.

In 1968, Subba Rao experimented with courtroom drama and detective fiction in his work Sudigundalu. The film received special mention at the Tashkent and Moscow Film Festivals for its inherent "film with a key" narrative. The film has garnered the National Film Award for Best Feature Film in Telugu, Nandi Award for Best Feature Film, and the Filmfare Award for Best Film - Telugu for that year and was featured at the International Film Festival of India.

Subba Rao scripted and directed the 1976 biographical film Mahakavi Kshetrayya based on the life of Kshetrayya, Subba Rao had expired in the middle of the making of the film and director C. S. Rao completed the rest of the shoot.

== Mentorship ==
Subba Rao's Biography has been published by veteran actor Krishna, who made his Telugu film debut under the direction of Subba Rao. K. Viswanath has worked as an associate director of Subba Rao for many years. The Telugu film chamber of commerce has instituted the Adurthi Subba Rao Award in his honour.

== Filmography ==
Year	Film	Language	Role
1948	Kalpana	Hindi	Assistant Director
1954	Balanandam	Telugu	Assistant Director
1954	Amara Sandesam	Telugu	Director
1957	Todi Kodallu	Telugu	Editor, Screenplay and Director
1957	Engal Veettu Mahalakshmi	Tamil	Editor, Screenplay and Director
1958	Aada Pettanam	Telugu	Director
1959	Mangalya Balam	Telugu	Writer and Director
1959	Manjal Mahimai	Tamil	Writer and Director
1959	Engal Kuladevi	Tamil	Director
1960	Nammina Bantu	Telugu	Director
1960	Pattaliyin Vetri	Tamil	Director
1960	Kumudham	Tamil	Director
1961	Velugu Needalu	Telugu	Director
1961	Iddaru Mitrulu	Telugu	Director
1961	Krishna Prema	Telugu	Director
1962	Manchi Manasulu	Telugu	Director
1963	Chaduvukunna Ammayilu	Telugu	Screenplay and Director
1964	Mooga Manasulu	Telugu	Director
1964	Dagudu Moothalu	Telugu	Director
1964	Doctor Chakravarty	Telugu	Director
1965	Sumangali	Telugu	Director
1965	Tene Manasulu	Telugu	Writer and Director
1965	Thodu Needa	Telugu	Director
1966	Kanne manasulu	Telugu	Director
1967	Milan	Hindi	Screenplay and Director
1967	Poola Rangadu	Telugu	Director
1967	Sudigundalu	Telugu	Screenplay and Director
1969	Man Ka Meet	Hindi	Director
1969	Doli	Hindi	Screenplay and Director
1970	Darpan	Hindi	Producer and Director
1970	Maro Prapancham	Telugu	Director
1970	Mastana	Hindi	Director
1971	Rakhwala	Hindi	Director
1972	Jeet	Hindi	Producer and Director
1972	Vichitra Bandham	Telugu	Director
1973	Jwar Bhata	Hindi	Director
1973	Insaf	Hindi	Director
1973	Mayadari Malligadu	Telugu	Producer and Director
1974	Bangaaru Kalalu	Telugu	Director
1975	Gajula Kishtayya	Telugu	Producer and Director
1975	Gunavanthudu	Telugu	Director
1975	Sunehra Sansar	Hindi	Director
1976	Mahakavi Kshetrayya	Telugu	Director

== Awards ==
=== National Film Awards ===
National Film Award for Best Feature Film in Telugu

- Sudigundalu - 1967
- Doctor Chakravarthy - 1964
- Mooga Manasulu - 1963
- Nammina Bantu - 1960
- Mangalya Balam - 1959
- Thodi Kodallu - 1957

National Film Award for Best Feature Film in Tamil

- Kumudham - 1961

Nandi Awards

- 1964 - Nandi Award for Best Feature Film - Doctor Chakravarthy
- 1967 - Nandi Award for Best Feature Film - Sudigundalu
- 1976 - Nandi Award for Best Feature Film - Mahakavi Kshetrayya

Filmfare Awards South

- Filmfare Award for Best Film – Telugu - Sudigundalu
