= Thene Manasulu (1965 film) =

1965 film by Adurthi Subba Rao

- Theatrical release poster
- Directed by: Adurthi Subba Rao
- Screenplay by: Adurthi Subba Rao
- Story by: Mullapudi Venkata Ramana; K. Viswanath
- Dialogues by: Aatreya, K. Viswanath
- Based on: Vakrinchina Sarala Rekhalu by K. R. K. Mohan
- Produced by: C. Sundaram
- Starring: Krishna; Ram Mohan; Sandhya Rani; Sukanya
- Cinematography: P. S. Selvaraj
- Edited by: T. Krishna
- Music by: K. V. Mahadevan
- Production company: Babu Movies
- Release date: 31 March 1965
- Running time: 174 minutes
- Country: India
- Language: Telugu

Thene Manasulu (transl. Sweet hearts) is a 1965 Indian Telugu-language romance film directed by Adurthi Subba Rao and produced by C. Sundaram under the Babu Movies banner. The film stars Krishna, Ram Mohan, Sukanya, and Sandhya Rani in lead roles. Notably, it was the first Telugu social film to be shot entirely in colour. The story was based on the novel Vakrinchina Saralarekhalu by K. R. K. Mohan.

The film marked the debut of Krishna in a lead role and also the acting debut for Ram Mohan, Sandhya Rani and Sukanya. Despite initial skepticism from some in the industry about casting newcomers, Tene Manasulu became a commercial success and ran for 100 days in theatres. The film is also known for its popular soundtrack composed by K. V. Mahadevan, with songs like "Divinundi Bhuviki" and "Yemamma Ninnenamma" becoming hits. It was remade in Hindi as Doli (1969).

== Plot ==
The story revolves around the intertwined lives of four main characters: Sita, Bhanumathi, Chittibabu, and Basavaraju. Sita is the daughter of Narasaraju, and Bhanumathi is the daughter of Srinivasa Rao. Chittibabu agrees to marry Sita on the condition that her father sends him to the United States for higher studies. However, after Chittibabu leaves, Srinivasa Rao's office money is stolen by Narasaraju, and he flees, leaving Bhanumathi behind.

Basavaraju, who was originally supposed to marry Bhanumathi, rejects her without even seeing her. Bhanumathi moves to the city with her mother and starts working, unaware that Basavaraju falls in love with her. Meanwhile, Chittibabu returns from the U.S. and neglects Sita, instead falling for Bhanumathi. Bhanumathi, realizing the situation, enacts a drama to reunite Chittibabu and Sita. In the end, she marries Basavaraju, and the film concludes with both couples finding happiness.

== Cast ==
- Krishna as Basavaraju
- Ram Mohan as Chittibabu
- Sandhya Rani as Sita
- Sukanya as Bhanumati
- Venkateswara Rao as Srinivasa Rao
- G. S. R. Murthy as Narasaraju
- Radha Kumari as Basavaraju's stepmother
- Baby Rojarani as Chinni

== Production ==
=== Development ===
In the mid-1960s, director Adurthi Subba Rao wanted to make a film with newcomers as the stars. It was decided to adapt K. R. K. Mohan's novel Vakrinchina Sarala Rekhalu with the title Thene Manasulu. The film was produced by C. Sundaram under Babu Movies, Mullapudi Venkata Ramana was hired as the screenwriter and K. Viswanath as associate director. Viswanath also worked as the dialogue writer alongside Aatreya. Cinematography was handled by P. S. Selvaraj, and editing by T. Krishna.

=== Casting ===
Babu Movies released an advertisement saying the film required newcomers in the lead, and thousands of aspiring actors auditioned. Hema Malini and J. Jayalalithaa, not yet the stars of Hindi and Tamil cinema they would later become, were among those who auditioned, but both were rejected. Krishnam Raju too was an unsuccessful contender.

Krishna and Rammohan were selected from thousands of applicants to play the two male leads. Sukanya and Sandhyarani, hailing from Rajahmundry and Vijayawada respectively, were cast as the female leads. This was Krishna's first film in a major role, after he appeared as an extra in the 1962 releases Padandi Munduku and Kula Gotralu. Krishna's remuneration for the film was ₹2,000.

=== Filming ===
Adurthi Subba Rao, known for directing films with established stars, took on the challenge of working with newcomers. The actors were rigorously trained in dialogue delivery by K. Viswanath, while Hiralal coached them in dance sequences. Voice training sessions were held on the beach to help the cast project their voices more effectively.

Principal photography began at Sarathi Studios, Hyderabad. The film was initially planned to be in black-and-white, but after seven to eight reels were shot, Adurthi decided to reshoot the entire film in Eastmancolor. Thene Manasulu thus became the first Telugu social film to be shot completely in colour. (Note: Lava Kusa (1963), the first full-length Telugu colour film was not a "social", i.e. a film having a contemporary setting.) A few scenes required Krishna to ride a scooter, so actor Raavi Kondala Rao, at Adurthi’s request, taught Krishna to drive the scooter in the streets leading from Sarathi Studios to Sanathnagar. It took four days for Krishna to learn scooter driving. Thene Manasulu (1965) showcased Krishna's willingness to perform risky stunts. In one scene, he impressed the crew by jumping from a moving scooter onto a speeding jeep without using a double, a feat that left the director Adurthi Subba Rao amazed.

== Soundtrack ==
The soundtrack was composed by K. V. Mahadevan, while the lyrics were written by Aatreya and Dasaradhi.

No.	Title	Lyrics	Singer(s)	Length
1.	"Em Endukani Ee Siggendukani"	Aatreya	P. Susheela, P. B. Sreenivas
2.	"Yemamma Ninnenamma Yelagunnavu"	Aatreya	P. Susheela, Ghantasala
3.	"Dhivinundi Bhuviki Digivache"	Dasaradhi	P. Susheela, Ghantasala
4.	"1 2 3 4"	Aatreya	P. Susheela, Padmanabham
5.	"Nee Edhuta Nenu Vaaredhuta Neevu"	Aatreya	P. Susheela
6.	"Anadhiga Jarugutunna Anyayam Idhile"	Aatreya	P. Susheela
7.	"Purushudu Nenai Puttali"	Aatreya	P. Susheela, P. B. Sreenivas, Ghantasala
8.	"Yevaro Yevaro Neevaadu"	Dasaradhi	P. Susheela

== Release and reception ==
Thene Manasulu was released on 31 March 1965. The film became a commercial success, running for over 100 days in theatres. Critics praised the film for its fresh cast and technical achievements, particularly the cinematography and music.

== Legacy ==
Adurthi Subba Rao remade the film in Hindi as Doli (1969) which was also successful. Subba Rao signed the four lead actors again for his next film, Kanne Manasulu (1966) which turned out to be an average grosser. Despite Thene Manasulu's success, only Krishna became a star among the four leads.

After the film, Krishna caught the attention of producers Doondi and Sundarlal Nahata, who were impressed by his daring stunt of jumping onto a speeding car without a double. Recognizing his potential, they cast him in the spy thriller Gudachari 116 (1966), which became a major success and a turning point in Krishna's career.

== Bibliography ==
- Rajadhyaksha, Ashish; Willemen, Paul (1998) [1994]. Encyclopaedia of Indian Cinema. British Film Institute and Oxford University Press. ISBN 0-19-563579-5.
