= Rajeswari Sunder Rajan =

- Born: 1950 (age 75–76); Mumbai, Maharashtra, India
- Education: Bombay University, George Washington University
- Occupations: Professor of English, editor and author
- Notable work: Scandal of the State: Women, Law and Citizenship in Postcolonial India

Rajeswari Sunder Rajan (born 1950) is an Indian feminist scholar, a professor in English, and author of several books on issues related to feminism and gender. Her research interest has covered many subjects such as of the pre and post colonial period, Indian English writing, gender and cultural issues related to South Asia, and the English literature of the Victorian era. She has also edited a series called the "Issues in Contemporary Indian Feminism", and "Signposts: Gender Issues in Post-Independence India". She has authored many books of which the notable ones are the Scandal of the State: Women, Law and Citizenship in Postcolonial India and Real and Imagined Women: Gender, Culture and Postcolonialism.

== Biography ==
Rajan was born in present-day Mumbai, Maharashtra in 1950. Her initial college education was in Bombay University from where she received a degree of Bachelor of Arts (B.A) in English in 1969 and a Master of Arts (M.A) degree in English in 1971. Later, she pursued for her doctoral degree in George Washington University, Washington DC and obtained her Ph.D. in English.

After working in India as a lecturer she moved to the United Kingdom where she was a Fellow at the Wolfson College and then worked as Reader in English in the University of Oxford. In New Delhi, her assignments have been as Senior Fellow at the Nehru Memorial Museum and Library and at the Centre for Women's Development Studies(CWDS). She has also worked at the Oberlin College, Ohio as Shansi Visiting Professor.

Rajan has debated on issues of gender, postcolonialism and culture in relation to nationalist issues in Independent India. Her research work has covered English literature of the nineteenth-century United Britain including literature of the Anglophone postcolonial period. Her editing assignments have covered issues in Indian Feminism. She is also a Joint Editor of Interventions, an international journal of postcolonial studies. her essay on the practice of Sati (1990) has appeared in the Yale Journal of Criticism and her book The Lie of the Land (1992) is on post-Independence English studies. She has worked as co-editor of The Crisis of Secularism in India (2006)." She also served on the Humanities jury for the Infosys Prize in 2019.

== Publications ==
- The Lie of the land: English literary studies in India (1992)
- The Prostitution Question(s): (female) Agency, Sexuality and Work (1996)
- Is the Hindu Goddess a Feminist? (1997)
- Signposts: Gender Issues in Post-independence India (1999)
- Real and Imagined Women: Gender, Culture and Postcolonialism (2003)
- The Scandal of the State: Women, Law, and Citizenship in India (2003)
- The Postcolonial Jane Austen (with You-Me Park) (2015)
- Commodities and Culture in the Colonial World, co-ed with Supriya Chaudhuri, Josephine McDonagh, and Brian Murray, London and New York, Routledge, 2017
