= Rahasyam (1967 film) =

- Theatrical release poster
- Directed by: Vedantam Raghavayya
- Screenplay by: Vempati Sadasivabrahmam
- Story by: R. Subramanyam Pillai
- Produced by: Allareddy Sankara Reddy
- Starring: Akkineni Nageswara Rao; B. Saroja Devi; Kanta Rao; Krishna Kumari; S. V. Ranga Rao
- Cinematography: P. L. Roy
- Edited by: Venu
- Music by: Ghantasala
- Production company: Lalitha Siva Jyothi Films
- Distributed by: Vani Films
- Release date: 10 November 1967
- Running time: 174 minutes
- Country: India
- Language: Telugu

Rahasyam (transl. Secret) is a 1967 Indian Telugu-language swashbuckler film directed by Vedantam Raghavayya. It stars Akkineni Nageswara Rao, B. Saroja Devi, Kanta Rao, Krishna Kumari and S. V. Ranga Rao, with music composed by Ghantasala. The film was produced by Allareddy Shankar Reddy under the Lalitha Siva Jyothi Films banner.

== Cast ==
- Akkineni Nageswara Rao as Mandakudu
- B. Saroja Devi as Kumari
- Kanta Rao as Ravi Chandra
- Krishna Kumari as Rajyalakshmi
- S. V. Ranga Rao as Rakthabhisha
- Gummadi as Srikhanta Prabhu
- V. Nagayya as Karunakara Maharaju
- Rajanala as Virupakshudu
- Relangi as Trishankhu
- Ramana Reddy as Krishna
- Haranath as Narada Maharshi
- Anjali Devi as Lalita MahaTripurasundari Devi
- G. Varalakshmi as Chandramma
- Suryakantam as Mallamma
- Girija as Sarvani Devi
- Geethanjali as Meenakshi
- C. H. Narayana Rao as Nagayya
- Lingamurthy as Srikhanta's follower
- Vangara as Karunakara's priest
- Jayanthi
- Jhansi as Kamakshi

== Music ==
Rahasyam

Film score by Ghantasala
- Released: 1967
- Genre: Soundtrack
- Length: 41:13
- Producer: Ghantasala

Music was composed by Ghantasala.

S. No.	Song title	lyrics	Singers	length
1	"Chaaradesi Kanulato"	C. Narayana Reddy	Ghantasala, P. Susheela	3:06
2	"Magaraya Valaraya"	Malladi Ramakrishna Sastry	Ghantasala, P. Susheela	3:20
3	"Idiye Deva Rahasyam"	Arudra	P. Susheela, P. Leela	3:06
4	"Srilalitha Shivajyothi Sarvakaamadaa"	Malladi Ramakrishna Sastry	Ghantasala, P. Leela, Vaidehi, Sarojini, Komala, Padma	5:53
5	"Unnadile Dagunnadile"	C. Narayana Reddy	Ghantasala, P. Susheela	3:50
7	"Sadhinchanouna"	Samudrala	Ghantasala, P Susheela	4:51
8	"Tirumala Girivasa"	Malladi Ramakrishna Sastry	Ghantasala	3:17
9	"Girija Kalyanam"	Malladi Ramakrishna Sastry	Ghantasala, Chorus	13:50
