= Kanne Manasulu =

1966 Telugu film by Adurthi Subba Rao

- Poster
- Directed by: Adurthi Subba Rao
- Written by: Mullapudi Venkata Ramana
- Produced by: Adurthi Subba Rao
- Starring: Ram Mohan; Krishna; Sandhya Rani; Sukanya
- Edited by: T. Krishna
- Music by: K. V. Mahadevan
- Production company: Babu Movies
- Release date: 13 July 1966
- Running time: 152 minutes
- Country: India
- Language: Telugu

Kanne Manasulu (transl. Virgin Hearts) is a 1966 Indian Telugu-language film directed by Adurthi Subba Rao. The film features Ram Mohan, Sandhya Rani, Krishna and Sukanya in lead role, with music composed by K. V. Mahadevan. This marks the second collaboration of the same cast and director, following the success of Thene Manasulu (1965). Kanne Manasulu was Krishna's second lead role and performed moderately at the box office.

== Plot ==
A dacoit tries to rape Bangaramma and in the attempt, loses his eyesight. Bangaramma jumps into the river to commit suicide, but is saved by people of the village where she delivers a child. The dacoit realises his folly and turns over a new leaf and asks for her forgiveness. Then, he commits suicide in a temple that he built.

== Cast ==
- Ram Mohan
- Krishna as Gangulu
- Sandhyarani
- Sukanya
- M. V. Chalapathy Rao
- Gummadi
- Suryakantham

== Soundtrack ==
The music is composed by K. V. Mahadevan.
