= Mangalampadu =

Coordinates: 13°44′N 79°56′E

- Village
- Interactive map of Mangalampadu
- Country: India
- State: Andhra Pradesh
- District: Tirupati

Languages
  - Official: Telugu
- Time zone: UTC+5:30 (IST)
- Vehicle registration: AP

Mangalampadu is a village in Tirupati district of the Indian state of Andhra Pradesh. It is located in Sullurpeta mandal.

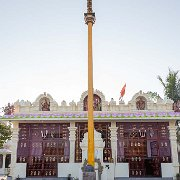
Venugopala Swamy Temple

== Transport ==
=== Road ===
Sullurpet is the nearest town to Mangalampadu, 13 km away. Sullurpet straddles NH 16 connecting Chennai and Kolkata. When coming from Sullurpet, taking a right turn at Elupuru Cross leads to Mangalampadu and this route rejoins the Kalahasti Road bypassing BN Kandriga.

=== Rail ===
The nearest railway station is Sullurpet, which is connected to Chennai Central by suburban trains running daily.

=== Bus ===
There is a bus stop at Mangalampadu serviced by multiple bus routes. Sullurpet also has a bus stop serviced by KSRTC and APSRTC buses, with direct bus connectivity to Bangalore, Chennai, Tirupati and other cities and towns nearby.
