= Sudigundalu =

- Theatrical release poster
- Directed by: Adurthi Subba Rao
- Written by: N. R. Nandi (dialogues)
- Screenplay by: K. Viswanath
- Story by: B. S. Thapa
- Produced by: Adurthi Subba Rao; Akkineni Nageswara Rao
- Starring: Akkineni Nageswara Rao
- Cinematography: K. S. Ramakrishna
- Edited by: T. Krishna
- Music by: K. V. Mahadevan
- Production company: Chakravarthy Chitra
- Release date: 28 June 1968
- Running time: 136 minutes
- Country: India
- Language: Telugu

Sudigundalu (transl. Whirlpools) is a 1968 Indian Telugu-language philosophical film, produced by Akkineni Nageswara Rao, Adurthi Subba Rao under the Chakravarthy Chitra banner and directed by Adurthi Subba Rao. It stars Akkineni Nageswara Rao, and has music composed by K. V. Mahadevan. It was released on 28 June 1968. The film won the National Film Award for Best Feature Film in Telugu, The Nandi Award for Best Feature Film, and the Filmfare Award for Best Film – Telugu. It marked the debut of Nageswara Rao's son Nagarjuna as child artist in a cameo. The cult classic film was screened at the Tashkent Film Festival, and the International Film Festival of India.

== Plot ==
Vikram is the son of Panakala Rao, a politician who campaigns for the welfare of the poor, while Sandhya is the daughter of a millionaire Koteswara Rao. Vikram and Sandhya are in a relationship. Vikram has a stepmother Pankajam who is around the same age as him, and they do not get along.

In court, when the judgment is about to be given for the case, Chandra Sekharam appears and volunteers to argue in defense of the culprits, which shocks everyone. By doing so, he unearths the true motive and declares that they have done these acts in sheer madness. Vikram and Sandhya once attended a school play in which Raja and Sandhya's younger brother participated and her brother was jealous of Raja who earned the prize. Vikram, in an effort to appease Sandhya and her brother, said that he will kill Raja. Vikram stole crime novels that Pankajam reads, read them himself, and then planned to commit the murder the same way by taking Raja to a swimming pool and drowning him. Vikram reveals in court that he killed Raja for fun and felt the tendency to kill others due to mixed feelings and mental instability, including Pankajam.

After cross-examining Panakala Rao, Koteswara Rao, and their respective wives, Chandra Sekharam brings out the fact that the youngsters have grown up to become irresponsible and choose the wrong path due to their upbringing. Vikram's parents never cared enough to teach their son about morality while Sandhya's parents take advantage of their wealth power and allow her to get used to vices though she is still a minor.

== Cast ==
- Akkineni Nageswara Rao as Judge Chandrasekharam
- Master Raja as Raja (son of Kantha Rao)
- Gummadi as Public Prosecutor
- Ram Mohan as Police Inspector
- Sakshi Ranga Rao as Venkatappaiah
- Mada as John Maridaiah
- Pisupati Venkateswara Rao as Panakala Rao
- P. Koteswara Rao as Koteswara Rao
- Vijayachander as Vikram Kumar
- Pushpa Kumari as Rathamma
- Sukanya as Pankajam
- Sandhya Rani as Seeta
- Meena Kumari
- Sasikala as Sasikala
- Prasanna Rani as Sandhya Rani
- Master Akkineni Venkat as Cameo
- Master Akkineni Nagarjuna (cameo)
- Savitri as Lakshmi, Chandrasekharam's wife (portrait appearance)

== Background ==
Adurthi Subba Rao, who has directed many commercially successful films, made this film with the intention of making artistic and informative films. He also shared the production duties of the film with actor Nageswara Rao.

The 1959 American movie Compulsion (1959 film) is the inspiration for the script of the movie. American convicted criminals, Leopold and Loeb and their trial form the plot of the film Compulsion.

== Soundtrack ==
Sudigundalu

Film score by K. V. Mahadevan
- Released: 1968
- Genre: Soundtrack
- Length: 11:45
- Producer: K. V. Mahadevan

Music composed by K. V. Mahadevan. The music released on Audio Company.

S. No	Song title	Lyrics	Singers	length
1	"Vinara Sodara"	Dasaradhi	Ghantasala, P. Susheela, Vasantha	11:45

== Awards ==
National Film Awards

- National Film Award for Best Feature Film in Telugu

Nandi Awards

- Nandi Award for Best Feature Film - Gold - Adurthi Subba Rao and Akkineni Nageswara Rao

Filmfare Awards South

- Filmfare Award for Best Film – Telugu
