= Ghantasala (musician) =

Indian musician

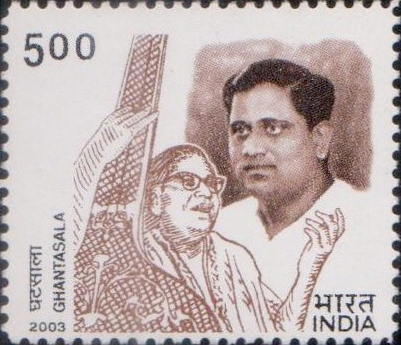
- Ghantasala on a 2003 stamp of India

Background information
- Born: Ghantasala Venkateswara Rao; 4 December 1922; Chowtapalli, Krishna District, Andhra Pradesh, India
- Died: 11 February 1974 (aged 51) Madras, Tamil Nadu, India
- Genres: Film music (playback singing), Indian classical music
- Occupations: Singer, composer
- Years active: 1922–1974
- Spouse(s): Savitri and Sarala Devi
- Website: www.ghantasala.info

Ghantasala Venkateswara Rao (4 December 1922 – 11 February 1974), known mononymously by his surname Ghantasala, was an Indian playback singer and film composer known for his works predominantly in Telugu and Kannada cinema and also in Tamil, Malayalam, Tulu and Hindi language films. He is considered one of the greatest singers of Telugu and Indian cinema. In 1970, he received the Padma Shri, India's fourth highest civilian award, for his contribution to Indian cinema. According to The Hindu and The Indian Express, Ghantasala was 'such a divine talent and with his songs he could move the hearts of the people'. 'Ghantasala's blending of classical improvisations to the art of light music combined with his virtuosity and sensitivity puts him a class apart, above all others in the field of playback singing'. Gifted with what Indian film historian V. A. K. Ranga Rao called 'the most majestic voice', Ghantasala helped Telugu film music develop its own distinct character. He is referred to as the 'Gaana Gandharva' for his mesmerising voice and musical skills.

Ghantasala performed in the United States, England and Germany, and for the United Nations. The government of Andhra Pradesh marked the occasion of 25 years of his film career as Silver Jubilee Celebrations of Ghantasala in Hyderabad on 1 February 1970. More than 30,000 people attended the function held at the Lal Bahadur Stadium, Hyderabad. Ghantasala continues to be popular. Statutes of his likeness have been installed across Andhra Pradesh. Every year, the anniversaries of his birth and death are celebrated in India and overseas.

== Early life ==
Ghantasala was born in 1922 into a Telugu Brahmin family of Ghantasala Soorayya, a professional singer in Chowtapalli, a village in Gudivada taluk of Krishna District. But his ancestral native place was tekupalli village, mopidevi mandal, krishna district which falls under diviseema. During his childhood, Ghantasala used to dance to his father's Tharangams. His father died when Ghantasala was a child, and he was brought up by his maternal uncle. He took formal music training from Patrayani Sitarama Sastry, and joined Maharajah's Government College of Music and Dance in Vijayanagram.

== Career ==
Ghantasala participated in the Quit India Movement of 1942, for which he was arrested and imprisoned for 18 months at the Alipore (Allipura) Jail, Ballari. After leaving jail, he met Samudrala Sr., who advised him to try his luck in the film industry as a singer. Ghantasala married Savitri, who lived in a village called Pedapulivarru. In that village, Ghantasala met lyricist Samudrala Sr., who was impressed with his voice and inducted him into the Madras film industry. Before Ghantasala found fame, he was already an accomplished Carnatic music singer.

Ghantasala's first break as a singer came from All India Radio. Later on, Peketi Siva Ram from the His Master's Voice studios recorded Ghantasala's private songs. Ghantasala debuted as a chorus singer and for a character role in Seeta Rama Jananam by Pratibha Films. After this, he worked with well-known music directors Gali Penchala and C. R. Subbaraman. Ghantasala's first film as a music director was Laxmamma. He introduced the technique of changing the vocal pitch and diction to suit the actor singing the songs. Ghantasala was peerless at Padyam renderings and his way with the Telugu padyam was incomparable.

Producer Chittajallu Krishnaveni gave Ghantasala his first job as full-time music director for her film Mana Desam, which was N. T. Rama Rao's first film. It established Ghantasala as a music composer-cum-playback singer. He was the most prolific film composer and playback singer in Telugu cinema until the mid-1970s. He composed music for many popular Telugu movies, including Patala Bhairavi, Mayabazar, Lava Kusa, Pandava Vanavasam, Rahasyam, Gundamma Katha, Paramanandayya Shishyula Katha and Pelli Chesi Chudu, and also for popular Tamil and Kannada films in the 1950s and 1960s. Ghantasala sang for and directed the music for a Hindi film Jhandaa ooncha Rahe Hamara (1964). The song "Siva Sankari" from the film Jagadeka Veeruni Katha (1961) believed to be one of the most challenging songs from classical Hindusthani and carnatic style was sung by Ghantasala in a single take.

=== Private recordings and Bhagavad Gita ===
Ghantasala served as the Aaasthana Gaayaka (court musician) for the Tirumala Tirupati Devasthanams. He recorded private albums, including Bhagawad Geetha, Patriotic Songs, Padyalu—a unique genre of Telugu, singing the verses in dramatic style—Pushpa Vilapam, Devotional and folk songs. His recording of "Bhagawad Geetha", which he directed and sang, can now be heard daily in the Tirumala temple. According to music director Pendyala Nageswara Rao and playback singer P. Susheela, "Ghantasala alone is the foremost among playback singers who had a full-fledged melodious powerful voice range which could accommodate in uniformity, all the three octaves in music quite comfortably".

Pendyala Nageswara Rao channelled Ghantasala's classical musical knowledge and skills in classical renditions and in Telugu films including siva sankari from film Jagadekaveeruni Katha, Rasika Raja taguvaramu kama from film Jayabheri, and Syamala Dandakam – Manikya Veena from film Mahakavi Kalidasu. Pendyala said these renditions were recorded only in one take by Ghantasala.

== Death ==
Ghantasala died on 11 February 1974, two months after his 51st birthday, due to cardiac arrest at a hospital in Chennai. The last song he recorded was for a documentary – Bhadrachala Ramadasu Vaibhavam (music by Master Venu) from the hospital bed the day before his death.

== Legacy ==
The Indian government released a postage stamp and first day cover to celebrate Ghantasala's work on 11 February 2003. He is the first movie singer-composer of the south to be accorded this honour. The US Postal Department has released a postal stamp on Ghantasala on 6 October 2014. The postal stamp was jointly released by the North American Telugu Society (NATS) in collaboration with Telugu Literary and Cultural Association (TLCA) in New York. Various awards named after Ghantasala are given every year, including the "Ghantasala melody king award". Recipients of this award include playback singers K J Yesudas and P. Susheela, and Indian Idol Sri Ramachandra. Ghantasala Arts Academy has instituted the "Ghantasala National Award"; the first winner was playback singer S. P. Balasubrahmanyam.

== Awards ==
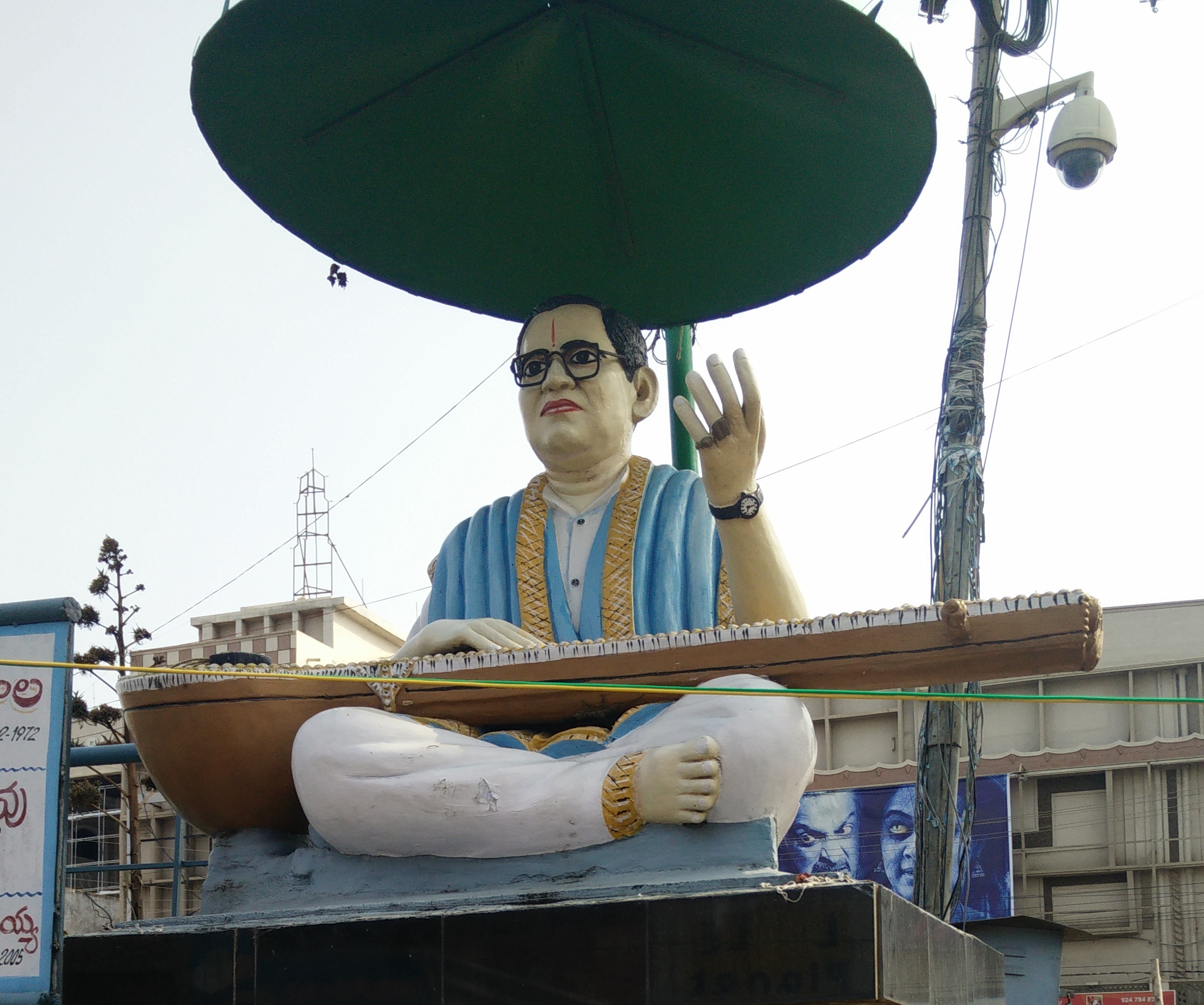
Ghantasala statue in Guntur

Ghantasala was honoured with the "Padmashri" by the Government of India. He won the best playback singer award in Andhra Pradesh every year for nearly 30 years, a feat unachieved by any other playback singer.

After the saint poet Annamacharya in the 15th century, Ghantasala has been the only singer to perform devotional songs inside the Tirumala Venkateswara Temple near the Lord Moola Virat.

== Tributes ==
"Kala Pradarshini Ghantasala Puraskar", the only award instituted directly by the Ghantasala Family curated by his second son Ravi Ghantasala and his wife, acclaimed dancer Parvathi Ravi Ghantasala, which aims to honor legends who have contributed to "Arts and Philanthropy". the Inaugural awards were presented to Dr.S.P.Balasubramanyam (music), Dr. Padma Subramaniam (Dance) and Dr. Nalli Kuppusamy Chetty (Philanthropy).

The Ghantasala Puraskar Award 2014, given every year by Sharan Incorporation, has been conferred on Rao Bala Saraswathi Devi, who was the first Telugu playback singer. The Government music college in Vijayawada, Andhra Pradesh, is named after Ghantasala. Ghantasala Sangeetha Kalasala college in Hyderabad and Vizag offers six-month and one-year diploma courses on Ghantasala's light music, songs and music. Ghantasala Yuva kalakendram offers semester based courses specially for children and youth.SivaNandiAwardRecipient Ghantasala Yuva Kalakendram founder M.S.V.N.VamshikrishnaDevaraya conducts ghantasala musical workshops every year at tayagaraya gana sabha

== Personal life ==
Ghantasala Venkateswararao was married to Savitri and (Late) Sarala Devi. He had eight children: four daughters (Meera, Shyamala, Suguna, Shanthi) and four sons (Vijayakumar, Ravikumar, Shankarkumar, Ratnakumar). Shyamala, Suguna, Shanthi, Vijayakumar and Ratnakumar were born to Savtri and while Meera, Ravikumar and Shankar Kumar were born to Sarla Devi.

It is said that Ghantasala named his eldest son "Vijaya" Kumar after Vijaya Productions out of gratitude towards the organization that employed him as a permanent artiste. Sri Chakrapani, one of the producers of Vijaya Productions, presented Ghantasala with a purse with Rs. 25,000 realising his respect towards the organization. 10 years after his death, his youngest son Ratnakumar went on to become a popular dubbing artist.

== Filmography ==
- Tyagayya (1946)
- Anarkali (1955)
- Sri Venkateswara Mahatyam (1960)
- Sathya harichndra (Kannada)

== Playback singer and music director ==
Ghantasala composed Music for more than 110 films as stated by him, following is the list of 124 films for which he has composed Music. The list includes remakes and dubbed films. The date of release of the film is also given. The list includes Tamil, Kannada, and Hindi films besides Telugu films where he worked predominantly.

- Balaraju, 26 Feb 1948 Co Music Directors Gali Penchala Narasimha Rao and C. R. Subbaraman
- Ratnamala, 2 Jan 1948 as a Co Music Director to CR Subbaraman
- keelugurram, 19 Feb 1949
- Mayakkudirai, Maya Kudirai or Maya Kuthirai, Tamil 1949
- Manadesam, 24 Nov 1949
- లక్ష్మమ్మ, 26 Feb 1950
- Lakshmamma, Tamil Dubbed 1950
- Vali Sugriva, 19 Mar 1950
- Shavukaru, 7 April 1950
- Swapna Sundari, 9 Nov 1950 Co Music Director CR Subbaraman
- Swapna Sundari, Tamil Dubbed Film Co Music Director CR Subbaraman
- చంద్రవంక (1951 సినిమా), 2 Feb 1951
- Nirabaradhi, Tamil 1951
- Nirdoshi, 24 Feb 1951
- Pathala Bhairavi, 15 March 1951
- Pathala Bhairavi, Tamil 17 May 1951
- Pathala Bhairavi, Hindi Dubbed
- Palletooru, 16th Octo 1952
- Pelli Chesi Choodu, 29 Feb 1952
- Kalyanam Panni Paar, 15 Aug 1952
- Bratuku Teruvu, 6 Feb 1953 Co Music Director CR Subbaraman
- Rajeswari, 7 June 1952
- Bale Raman, 1956
- Paropakaram, 18 Jun 1953
- Paropakaram, Tamil 1953
- Jhanda Ooncha Rahe Hamara, Hindi 1964
- Chandraharam, 6 Jan 1954
- Chandraharam, Tamil 14 Jan 2014
- Cherapakura Chedevu, 6 July 1955
- Ellam Inba Mayam, Tamil 1 Apr 1955
- Kanyasulkam, 26 Aug 1955
- వదినగారి గాజులు (1955 సినిమా), 27 May 1955
- Guna Sundari, 16 Dec 1955
- Kalvanin Kadhali, 13 Nov 1955
- Astaaiswaryaalu, 1956
- Chiranjeevulu, 15 Aug 1956
- Amara Geetham, 1956
- Illarame Inbam, Tamil Dubbed of Cherapakura chedevu1956
- Jayam Manade, 4 May 1956
- Vetri Veeran, 4 May 1956
- కనకతార, 3 Mar 1956
- సొంతవూరు, 23 May 1956 Ghantasala is also it's Producer
- Mayabazar, 27 Mar 1957
- Mayabazar, Tamil 12 Apr 1957
- Mayabazar, Kannada Dubbed 1965
- రేపు నీదే, 1 Feb 1957
- Sarangadhara, 1 Nov 1957
- Sati Anasuya, 25th Octo 1957
- Vinayaka Chaviti, 22 Aug 1957
- తలవంచని వీరుడు, 6 Dec 1957 Dubbed Film
- Manchi Manasuku Manchi Rojulu, 15 Aug 1958
- పార్వతీ కళ్యాణం, 26 Dec 1958
- Pellinaati Pramanalu, 17 Dec 1958
- Vazhkai Oppandam, 4 Sep 1959
- Pelli Sandadi, 2 April 1959
- Sabash Ramudu, 4 Sep 1959
- Sabash Ramu,சபாஷ் ராமு, Tamil Dubbed 4 Sep 1959
- Sati Sukanya, 30 Jan 1959
- Vinayaga Chaturthi, Tamil 1959
- Ganesh Chaturti, Hindi Dubbed 1973
- Abhimanam, 26 Aug 1960
- Bhakta Raghunath, 4 Nov 1960
- Deepavali, 22 Sep 1960
- Narakasura Vadhe, Kannada Dubbing 1974
- Santhi Nivasam, 14 Jan 1960
- Shanti Nivas, Malayalam Dubbed 1962
- Sri Krishna Kuchela, 9 June 1961
- Sabash Raja, 9 Nov 1961
- Mohini Rukmaangada, 13 Jan 1962
- Gundamma Katha, 7 Jun 1962
- Manithan Maravillai, 10 Aug 1962
- Rakta Sambandham, 1 Nov 1962
- Tiger Ramudu, 8 Mar 1962
- Bhagyavantulu, 5 May 1962
- Aapta Mitrulu, 29 May 1963
- Bandipotu (1963 film), 15 Aug 1963
- Veera Kesari, Kannada 1963
- Lava Kusa, 29 March 1963
- Lava Kusa, Tamil 1963
- Lava Kusa, Kannada Dubbed
- Lava Kusa, Hindi Dubbed 1974
- Valmiki, 9 Feb 1963
- Valmiki, Tamil 1963
- Mamakaram, 2 March 1963
- Mahaveera Bheemasena, 27 Jul 1967
- Gudi Gantalu, 14 Jan 1964
- Marmayogi (1964 film), 22 Feb 1964
- Sri Satyanarayana Mahathyam, 27 Jun 1964
- Vaarasatwam, 19 Nov 1964
- Pandava Vanavasam, 14 Jan 1965
- Pandava Vanavasam, Tamil 1965
- CID, 23 Sep 1965
- Maduve Madi Nodu, 17 Dec 1965
- Paramanandayya Sishyula Katha, 7 Apr 1966
- Sakuntala, 3 Mar 1966
- Paduka Pattabhishekamu, పాదుకా పట్టాభిషేకం (1966 సినిమా), 16 Jun 1966
- Bhuvana Sundari Katha, 7 Apr 1967
- Nirdoshi, 2 Mar 1967
- Stree Janma, 31 Aug 1967
- Punyavathi, 3 Nov 1967
- Peddkkayya, 18 Nov 1967
- Rahasyam, 10 Dec 1967
- Veera Puja, 16 Feb 1968
- Govula Gopanna, 19 Apr 1968
- Chuttarikaalu, 22 June 1968
- Jeevita Bandham, 27 Jul 1968
- Bhale Abbayilu, 19 Mar 1969
- Jarigina Katha, 4 Jul 1969
- Merupu Veerudu, 6 Mar 1970
- Ali Baba 40 Dongalu, 4 Apr 1970
- Vijayam Manade, 15 Jul 1970
- Tallidandrulu, 23 Jul 1970
- Ramalayam, 22 Oct 1970
- Nanna Thamma, 26 Oct 1970
- Rendu Kutumbala Katha, 30th Octo 1970
- Pattindalla Bangaram, 1 May 1971
- Pattukunte Laksha, 8 May 1971
- Rangeli Raja, 11 Mar 1971
- Vamsodhaarakudu, 21 Apr 1972
- Mena Kodalu, 7 Jul 1972
- Rama Rajyam, 4 Apr 1973
- Poola Maala, 7 Dec 1973
- Tulasi, 23 May 1974
- Vasthade Maa baava, 1977 along with his son Ghantasala Vijaya Kumar
- Sati Savitri, 3 January 1978 along with Pendyala

=== Playback singer ===
Besides pictures where he is Music Director, Ghantasala recorded songs as playback singer for the movies under popular composers –V Nagaiah, Ogirala RamachandraRao, Galipenchala Narasimha Rao, S Rajeswara Rao, Pendyala Nageswara Rao, Susarla Dakshina Murthy, CR Subburaman, Aswathama, P Suribabu, Adi Narayana Rao, Master Venu, T V Raju, R Sudharshanam, R Goverdhanam, M S Viswanathan, Ramamoorthy, K V Mahadevan, T Chalapathi Rao, S P Kodandapani, GK Venkatesh, TG Lingappa, Shankar, Ganesh, Vedha, and Shankar Jai Kishan, among others.

- Yasodha Krishna (1975)
- Khaidi Babai (1974)
- Kodenagu (1974)
- Premalu Pellillu (1974)
- Taatamma Kala (1974)
- Dorababu (1974)
- Alluri Seetharamaraju (1974)
- Anbu Sagothararkal - Tamil (1973)
- Ida Lokam (1973)
- Doctor Babu (1973)
- Dabbuku Lokam Dasoham (1973)
- Bangaru Babu (1973)
- Ganga Manga (1973)
- Vaade Veedu (1973)
- Bhakta Tukaram (1973)
- Sarada (1973)
- Iddaru Ammaiyulu (1972)
- Datta Putrudu (1972)
- Koduku Kodalu (1972)
- Baala Bharatam (1972)
- Beedala Patlu (1972)
- Sri Krishnaanjaneya Yuddham (1972)
- Pandanti Kapuram (1972)
- Badi Panthulu (1972)
- Vichitra Bandham (1972)
- Sreemanthudu (1972)
- Kalam Marindi (1972)
- Manchi Rojulu Vacchayi (1972)
- Suputhrudu (1971)
- Pavitra Hrudayalu (1971)
- Sri Krishna Satya (1971)
- Adhrushtajatakudu (1971)
- Chinnanati Snehitulu (1971)
- Amayakuralu (1971)
- Raithu Bidda (1971)
- Jeevitha Chakram (1971)
- Prem Nagar (1971)
- Dasara Bullodu (1971)
- Bharya Biddalu (1971)
- Rajakota Rahasyam (1971)
- Sampoorna Ramayanam (1971)
- Ananda Nilayam (1971)
- Manasu Mangalyam (1971)
- Pavitra Bandham (1971)
- Oke Kutumbam (1970)
- Kathanayika Molla (1970)
- Suguna Sundari Katha (1970)
- Lakshmi Kataaksham (1970)
- Jai Jawan (1970)
- Balaraju Katha (1970)
- Dharmadata (1970)
- Sri Krishna Vijayam (1970)
- Talla Pellama (1970)
- Kodalu Diddina Kapuram (1970)
- Bhale Maastaru (1969)
- Ekaveera (1969)
- Manushulu Marali (1969)
- Sipayi Chinnaya (1969)
- Kathanayakudu (1969)
- Bandipotu Bheemanna (1969)
- Vichitra Kutumbam (1969)
- Gopaludu Bhoopaludu (1969)
- Kadaladu Vadaladu (1969)
- Buddhimantudu (1969)
- Sapta Swaralu (1969)
- Mooganomu (1969)
- Aatmeeyulu (1969)
- Vichitra Kutumbam (1969)
- Aadarsa Kutumbam (1969)
- Bandipotu Dongalu (1969)
- Bhale Rangadu (1969)
- Nindu Hrudayalu (1969)
- Lakshmi Nivasam (1968)
- Tikka Sankarayya (1968)
- Ramu (1968)
- Sri Rama Katha (1968)
- Kalasi Vacchina Adrushtam (1968)
- Varakatnam (1968)
- Bandhavyalu (1968)
- Bangaru Gajulu (1968)
- Uma Chandi Gowri Sankarula Katha (1968)
- Nindu Samsaram (1968)
- Baghdad Gaja Donga (1968)
- Undamma Bottu Pedata (1968)
- Brahmachari (1968)
- Adrushtavantulu (1968)
- Sukha Dukhalu (1967)
- Poola Rangadu (1967)
- Chikkadu Dorakadu (1967)
- Shri Krishnavataram (1967)
- Vasantasena (1967)
- Avekallu (1967)
- Ummadi Kutumbam (1967)
- Gruha Lakshmi (1967)
- Goodachari 116 (1967)
- Kanchukota (1967)
- Chadarangam (1967)
- Eedu Jodu (1967)
- Sri Krishna Rayabharam (1967)
- Aaasthiparulu (1966)
- Bheemanjaneya Yuddham (1966)
- Sangeetha Lakshmi (1966)
- Pidugu Ramudu (1966)
- Sri Krishna Pandaveeyam (1966)
- Sri Krishna Tulabharam (1966)
- Mohini Bhasmasura (1966)
- Adugu Jadalu (1966)
- Bhakta Potana (1966)
- Navaratri (1966)
- Rangula Ratnam (1966)
- Palnati Yuddham (1966)
- Aggi Barata (1966)
- Kanne Manasulu (1966)
- Anthastulu (1965)
- Sumangali (1965)
- Dorikithe Dongalu (1965)
- Zamindar (1965)
- Satya Harishchandra (1965)
- Jwala Dweepa Rahasyam (1965)
- Manushulu Mamathalu (1965)
- Manchi Kutumbam (1965)
- Tene Manasulu (1965)
- Veera Abhimanyu (1965)
- Uyyala Jampala (1965)
- Sri Simhachala Kshetra Mahima (1965)
- Prammelarjuneeyam (1965)
- Mangamma Sapadham (1965)
- Visala Hrudayalu (1965)
- Aatma Gouravam (1965)
- Naadi Aadajanme (1965)
- Preminchi choodu (1965)
- Chandrahaasa (1965)
- Todu Needa (1965)
- Daagudu Muthalu (1964)
- Desadrohulu (1964)
- Raamudu Bheemudu (1964)
- Pooja Phalam (1964)
- Navagraha Puja Mahima (1964)
- Babruvahana (1964)
- Dr. Chakravarthi (1964)
- Devatha (1964)
- Amarasilpi Jakkana (1964)
- Muralikrishna (1964)
- Manchi Manishi (1964)
- Sabhash Soori (1964)
- Aatmabalam (1964)
- Bobbili Yuddham (1964)
- Sri Satyanarayana Mahathyam (1964)
- Manchi Chedu (1963)
- Anuragam (1963)
- Chaduvukunna Ammayilu (1963)
- Punarjanma (1963)
- Lakshaadikari (1963)
- Mooga Manasulu (1963)
- Sri Krishnaarjuna Yuddham (1963)
- Narthanasala (1963)
- Thobuttuvulu (1963)
- Tirupathamma Katha (1963)
- Paruvu Prathista (1963)
- Kulagothralu (1962)
- Aradhana (1962)
- Bhishma (1962)
- Tiger Ramudu (1962)
- Mahamantri Timmarusu (1962)
- Constable Kooturu (1962)
- Siri Sampadalu (1962)
- Manchi Manasulu (1962)
- Aatmabandhuvu (1962)
- Kalasi Vunte Kaladu Sukham (1961)
- Usha Parinayam (1961)
- Krishna Prema (1961)
- Pelli Kani Pillalu (1961)
- Velugu Needalu (1961)
- Gulebakavali katha (1961)
- Seetha Rama Kalyanam (1961)
- Bhakta Jayadeva (1961)
- Iddaru Mitrulu (1961)
- Jagadeka Veeruni Katha (1961)
- Bharya Bhartalu (1961)
- Bava Maradalu (1961)
- Vaagdanam (1961)
- Mahakavi Kalidasu (1960)
- Bhatti Vikramarka (1960)
- Sri Venkateswara Mahatyam (1960)
- Runanubandham (1960)
- Kuladaivam (1960)
- Bhakta Sabari (1960)
- Rajamukutam (1959)
- Ulagam Sirikkirathu (1959)
- Banda Ramudu (1959)
- Rechukka Pagatichukka (1959)
- Illarikam (1959)
- Jayabheri (1959)
- Bhakta Ambarisha (1959)
- Nammina Bantu (1959)
- Chenchu Lakshmi (1958)
- Karthavarayuni Katha (1958)
- Appu Chesi Pappu Koodu (1958)
- Mangalya Balam (1958)
- Kathavarayan (1958)
- Bhookailas (1958)
- Veera Kankanam (1957)
- Nala Damayanthi (1957)
- Panduranga Mahatyam (1957)
- Thodi Kodallu (1957)
- Dongallo Dora (1957)
- M L A (1957)
- Suvarna Sundari (1957)
- Yar Paiyan (1957)
- Bhale Ramudu (1956)
- Tenali Ramakrishna (1956)
- Harischandra (1956)
- Charanadaasi (1956)
- Pennin Perumai (1956) - 1 song
- Santhanam (1955)
- Swarna Manjari (1955)
- Jayasimha (1955)
- Kanyasulkam (1955)
- Donga Ramudu (1955)
- Anarkali (1955)
- Rani Ratnaprabha (1955)
- Sri Kalahastiswara Mahatyam (1954)
- Raju Peda (1954)
- Pedda Manushulu (1954)
- Kanna Talli (1953)
- Devadasu (1953)
- Chandi raani (1953)
- Prema (1952)
- Tingu Ranga (1952)
- Malliswari (1951)
- Swapna Sundari (1950)
- Gunasundari katha (1949)
- Laila Majnu (1949)
- Raksharekha (1949)
- Paithiyakkaran (1947)
- Swarga Seema (1945)

=== Private albums ===
- Pushpa Vilapam
- Patriotic Songs
- Bhagawad Geetha
- Folk Songs
- Devotional Songs

== See also ==
- Songs of Ghantasala
- Ghantasala film career silver jubilee felicitation at LB Stadium, Hyderabad(rare video)
