= Acharya Aatreya =

Indian poet, lyricist, playwright, and screenwriter

Aatreya
- Born: Kilambi Venkata Narasimhacharyulu; 7 May 1921; Utchuru, Madras Presidency, British India (present-day Andhra Pradesh, India)
- Died: 13 September 1989 (aged 68); Hyderabad, Andhra Pradesh, India
- Occupations: Lyricist; playwright; screenwriter
- Spouse: Padmavathi (m. 1940)
- Writing career
- Pen name: Acharya Aatreya
- Notable awards: Nandi Award for Best Lyricist; Honorary Doctorate

Acharya Aatreya (born Kilambi Venkata Narasimhacharyulu; 7 May 1921 – 13 September 1989) was an Indian poet, lyricist, playwright, and screenwriter known for his works in Telugu cinema and Telugu theatre. He received the state Nandi Award for Best Lyricist in 1981 for "Andamaina Lokamani" from the film Tholikoodi Koosindi. He is popularly known as Manasu Kavi (transl. Poet of the Heart).

== Life ==
Athreya was born on 7 May 1921 in Mangalampadu village near Sullurpeta, Nellore district of the Madras Presidency of British India. His birthname was Kilambi Venkata Narasimhacharyulu. He took Acharya from his birth name and Aatreya his Gotra name, combined them as Acharya Aatreya and adopted it as his pen name.

As a student in Nellore and Chittoor he wrote several plays. He abandoned his studies to participate in Quit India Movement and was jailed. After being released from jail, he worked as a clerk in a settlement office and as an assistant editor of a Nellore-based journal, Zamin Raithu.

Athreya married Padmavathi in 1940.

== Career ==
Athreya continued his pursuit for social reform, transformation and universal peace, with his 10 Natakams [plays] and 15 Natikas, which include Bhayam (transl. Fear), Viswa Shanti (transl. Universal Peace), Kappalu (transl. Frogs), Goutama Buddha, Ashoka Samrat, Parivartanam, Edureeta and Tirupati. He was awarded an Honorary Doctorate Degree by Dr. B.R. Ambedkar Open University of Hyderabad, for his contributions to Telugu literature.

Athreya made his film debut in 1951. He went on to write over 1400 film songs. In 1989, he published a compilation of his works titled Naa Paata Nee Nota Palakali (transl. You would sing my song).

== Death ==
Athreya died on 13 September 1989.

== Partial filmography ==
Year	Film	Songs
1951	Deeksha	"Pora Babu Po"
1955	Ardhangi	"Raka Raka Vacchavu Chandamama"
1957	Todi Kodallu	"Kaarulo Shikarukelle"
1958	Mundadugu	"Kodekaru Chinnavada – Vadiponi Vannekada"
1960	Sri Venkateswara Mahatyam	"Seshasailavasa Srivenkatesa"
1962	Manchi Manasulu	"Silalapai Silpaalu Chekkinaru"
1963	Mooga Manasulu	"Muddabanti Poovulo"
1964	Doctor Chakravarti	"Neevuleka Veena Palukalenannadi"
1964	Gudi Gantalu	"Evarikivaarau Svardhamlo"
1964	Murali Krishna	"Nee Sukhame Ne Korutunna"
1965	Antastulu	"Tella Cheera Kattukunnadi Evari Kosamu"
1965	Preminchi Choodu	"Adi Oka Idile Ataniki Tagule"
1965	Sumangali	"Kanulu Kanulato Kalabadite"
1965	Tene Manasulu	"Nee Eduta Nenu Vareduta Neevu"
1967	Private Master	
1968	Brahmachari	"Ee totalo Virabuseno Ee puvvu"
1969	Natakala Rayudu	
1970	Akka Chellelu	"Pandavulu Pandavulu Tummeda"
1971	Mattilo Manikyam	"Naa Maate Nee Maatai Chadavali"
1971	Prem Nagar	"Theta Theta Telugula Tellavari Velugula" "Manasu Gati Inte Manishi Bratukinte"
1972	Badi Pantulu	"Bharata Mataku Jejelu"
1972	Papam Pasivadu	"Amma Choodali Ninnu Naannani Choodali"
1973	Bhakta Tukaram	"Unnavaa Asalunnavaa Unte Kallu Moosukunnavaa"
1973	Mayadari Malligadu	"Navvuthu Bathakali Ra Tammudu, Navvuthu Chavali Ra"
1975	Babu	
1976	Antuleni Katha	"Kallalo Unnadedo Kannulake Telusu"
1976	Jyoti	"Sirimalle Poovalle Navvu Chinnari Papalle Navvu"
1978	Maro Charitra	"Vidhi Cheyu Vinthalanni MatilEni Chetalenani"
1979	Andamaina Anubhavam	"Andamaina Anubhavam", "Hello Nestam Bagunnava", "Kurralloy Kurrallu Verrekki Vunnollu", "Nuvve Nuvvamma Navvula Puvvamma"
1979	Guppedu Manasu	"Mauname Nee Bhasha O Mooga Manasa"
1979	Idi Katha Kaadu	"Sarigamalu Galagalalu"
1980	Tholi KodiKoosindi	"Andamaina Lokamani"
1981	Aakali Rajyam	"Saapatu Etu Ledhu Paataina Padu Brother"
1983	Abhilasha	"Velapala Ledu Kurrallataku"
1983	Kokilamma	"Kommameeda Kokilamma Kuhu Annadi" "Pallavinchava Naa Gontulo Pallavi kaava Naa Paatalo"
1985	Swati Mutyam	"Chinnaari Ponnaari Kittayyaa"
1987	Abhinandana	"Prema Enta Madhuram Priyuralu Antha Katinam" "Prema Ledani Premincha Raadhani" "Eduta Neeve Edalona Neeve"
1989	Prema	"Priyatama naa Hrudayama"
1988	Bhama Kalapam	"Actor as himself"
