= Palunku Pathram =

- Poster
- Directed by: M. Krishnan Nair
- Screenplay by: Thoppil Bhasi
- Produced by: A. L. Sreenivasan
- Starring: Prem Nazir; Sathyan; Padmini; Sukumari
- Cinematography: V. Selvaraj
- Edited by: V. P. Krishnan
- Music by: G. Devarajan
- Production company: ALS Productions
- Release date: 11 September 1970
- Country: India
- Language: Malayalam

Palunku Pathram (transl. Frail Vessel) is a 1970 Indian Malayalam-language film directed by M. Krishnan Nair and produced by A. L. Sreenivasan. The film stars Prem Nazir, Sathyan, Padmini and Sukumari, with musical score by G. Devarajan. It is a remake of the Tamil film Kai Kodutha Deivam, which was also remade previously in Telugu as Marapurani Katha (1967), and later in Hindi as Pyar Ki Kahani (1971).

== Cast ==
- Prem Nazir
- Sathyan
- Padmini
- Sukumari
- Jayabharathi
- Kaviyoor Ponnamma
- Adoor Bhasi
- Muthukulam Raghavan Pillai
- T. S. Muthaiah
- Baby Rajani
- K. P. Ummer
- Ushakumari
- Mythili

== Soundtrack ==
The music was composed by G. Devarajan and Vayalar Ramavarma penned the lyrics.

No.	Song	Singers	Length
1	"Arayanname"	K. J. Yesudas	
2	"Devaloka Radhavumaay"	K. J. Yesudas	
3	"Maayaajaalakavaathil"	K. J. Yesudas	
4	"Pachamalayil"	P. Susheela	
5	"Pachamalayil" (Sad)	P. Susheela	
6	"Sumangali Nee Ormikkumo"	K. J. Yesudas	
7	"Vasanthathin Makalallo"	K. J. Yesudas, P. Madhuri	
8	"Vasanthathin Makalallo" (Movie Version)	K. J. Yesudas, P. Susheela	
