= Venu Madhav =

Venu Madhav may refer to:

- Nerella Venu Madhav (1932–2018), Padmashri winning ventriloquist (mimicry artist)
- Venu Madhav (actor) (1969-2019), Telugu actor
