= Veera Abhimanyu (1965 film) =

1965 film by V. Madhusudhana Rao

- Theatrical release poster
- Directed by: V. Madhusudhana Rao
- Screenplay by: S. I. Peruman (dialogues)
- Based on: Mahabharata
- Produced by: Sundarlal Nahta; Doondi
- Starring: Gemini Ganesan; Balaji; A. V. M. Rajan; Kanchana
- Cinematography: Ravi
- Edited by: N. S. Prakasam
- Music by: K. V. Mahadevan
- Production company: Rajalakshmi Productions
- Release date: 20 August 1965
- Country: India
- Language: Tamil

Veera Abhimanyu is a 1965 Indian Tamil-language Hindu mythological film directed by V. Madhusudhana Rao and produced by Sunderlal Nahta and Doondi. Based on Abhimanyu, a character from the Indian epic Mahabharata, the film stars Gemini Ganesan leading an ensemble cast, including A. V. M. Rajan portraying the title character, A. V. M. Rajan and Kanchana. It was simultaneously filmed in Telugu as Veerabhimanyu, with a largely different cast though Kanchana featured in both films. The film was released on 20 August 1965, and failed commercially.

== Plot ==
The Pandava prince Arjunan explains to his pregnant wife Subhadrai the nuances of entering the Chakravyuha, a deadly war-plan created by Dronan. Abhimanyu, the child in Subhadrai's womb, listens to it. When Arjunan is about to explain how to come out of it, Krishnan shows up and diverts the topic. While the Pandavas are in the Virata Kingdom during the agnaatvaas, Abhimanyu grows up at Dwaraka as a valiant warrior. While chasing Uthrakumaran, Abhimanyu enters King Virata's garden and meets Uthrai, and they both fall in love. Abhimanyu seeks Ghatotkachan's support to marry Uthrai.

When the Pandavas' agnaatvaas ends, the marriage of Abhimanyu and Uthrai is conducted. Upon returning, the Pandavas seek their share of the kingdom, but the Kaurava prince Duryodhanan refuses to part with even five villages, leading to the Kurukshetra War. Drona creates the Chakravyuha to stop Abhimanyu, who is slayed by the Kauravas through deceit. To a devastated Arjunan, Krishna conveys, through his Vishvarupa, the truth about the circle of life.

== Cast ==
Male cast

- Gemini Ganesan as Krishnan
- Balaji as Arjunan
- A. V. M. Rajan as Abhimanyu
- T. K. Bhagavathi as Duryodhanan
- Nagesh as Uthrakumaran
- O. A. K. Thevar as Ghatotkachan
- S. V. Sahasranamam as King Virata
- E. R. Sahadevan as Bhiman
- M. R. Rajarathnam as Shakuni
- M. K. Mustafa as Dronan
- Natarajan as Dharuman
- T. K. Vijayan as Indran

Male cast (continued)

- Mahalingam as Balaraman
- K. V. S. Sharma as Bhishmar
- Kadhiresan as Karnan
- Karikol Raju as Neelamegan
- S. R. Gopal as Karmegam
- Bangalore Sundaram as Laknakumar
- K. K. Soundar as Jayadrathan
- Dhanapal as Susharman
- S. A. G. Swami as Dushathanan
- Jayaraman as Aswathama
- Ragunatha Rao as Sahadevan
- Koteeswara Rao as Kripacharya
- Vijayakumar as Nakulan

Female cast

- Kanchana as Uthrai
- G. Varalakshmi as Panjali
- S. Varalakshmi as Subhadrai
- Malathi as Sudeshna
- Geethanjali as Dancer
- Sujatha as Madhavi

== Production ==
Veera Abhimanyu revolves around Abhimanyu, a character in the Indian epic Mahabharata. Directed by V. Madhusudhana Rao and produced by Sunderlal Nahta and Doondi under the banner Rajalakshmi Productions, it was simultaneously produced in Tamil and Telugu languages, the latter as Veerabhimanyu which featured a largely different cast. In Tamil, A. V. M. Rajan played the title role of Abhimanyu, and Gemini Ganesan played Krishna. They were replaced in Telugu by Sobhan Babu and N. T. Rama Rao, respectively. Kanchana played Uttara in both versions. Since Kanchana was familiar with the story and already knew what Uttara would go through, she was comfortable when facing the camera. The screenplay was written by S. I. Peruman, cinematography was handled by Ravi, the editing by N. S. Prakasam, and the art direction by S. Krishna Rao.

== Soundtrack ==
The soundtrack was composed by K. V. Mahadevan, and the lyrics were written by Kannadasan. The song "Paarthen, Sirithen" is set in the Carnatic raga known as Sahana. While in Tiruppur, Kannadasan was relaxing after a meal. His assistant requested him to write a "sweet song"; immediately, Kannadasan broke into the verse "Paarthen sirithen pakkathil azhaithen, anru unaithen ena naan ninaithen, andha malaithen idhuvena malaithen"; each word ended with "then", meaning honey. The word appears 65 times in the song. Kannadasan took inspiration from a poem by Kambar, which used the same word five times. Writing for The Hindu, Sudha Balachandran praised the song's setting in the Sahana raga, and wrote that Kannadasan "penned lines with unique word-play, amazing puns and punctuated the verses with beautiful rhyming." Film critic Baradwaj Rangan, who defines a "list song" as one where the "structure is that of a list, a catalogue of similar-sounding (or similar-meaning) things", called it a list of "dazzling rhymes".

Track listing
No.	Title	Singer(s)	Length
1.	"Yugam Thorum Naan"	Sirkazhi Govindarajan
2.	"Velum Vizhiyum"	P. B. Sreenivas, P. Susheela
3.	"Thotta Idam"	P. Susheela
4.	"Povom Pudhu Ulagam"	P. B. Sreenivas, P. Susheela
5.	"Paarthen Sirithen"	P. B. Sreenivas, P. Susheela
6.	"Kallathaname Uruvai Vantha"	S. Janaki
7.	"Koorayil Neruppinai"	Sirkazhi Govindarajan
8.	"Neeyum Oru Pennanal"	P. B. Sreenivas, P. Susheela
9.	"Thuvakathil"	Sirkazhi Govindarajan

== Release and reception ==
Veera Abhimanyu was released on 20 August 1965, eight days after Veerabhimanyu (12 August). The Indian Express lauded the film, particularly the performances of Ganesan Rajan, Balaji Thevar, Nagesh and Varalakshmi, in addition to the battle sequences. Writing in Sport and Pastime, T. M. Ramachandran too praised the film, primarily for the cast performances, the storytelling, the sets and the trick photography. Despite this, the film did not succeed commercially, and distributors blamed the producers for casting Ganesan (instead of Rama Rao) as Krishna.
