= Gudi Gantalu =

- Theatrical release poster
- Directed by: V. Madhusudhana Rao
- Written by: Mullapudi Venkata Ramana (dialogues)
- Screenplay by: V. Madhusudhana Rao
- Story by: G. Balasubramaniam
- Based on: Aalayamani (Tamil)
- Produced by: Sunderlal Nehata; Doondy
- Starring: N. T. Rama Rao; Krishna Kumari
- Cinematography: C. Nageswara Rao
- Edited by: N. S. Prakash
- Music by: Ghantasala
- Production company: Raja Lakshmi Productions
- Release date: 14 January 1964
- Running time: 168 minutes
- Country: India
- Language: Telugu

Gudi Gantalu (transl. Temple bells) is a 1964 Indian Telugu-language drama film directed by V. Madhusudhana Rao. It stars N. T. Rama Rao and Krishna Kumari, with music composed by Ghantasala. The film was produced by Sunderlal Nehata and Doondy. It is a remake of the Tamil film Aalayamani (1962).

== Plot ==
Zamindar Srinivasa Rao, also known as Vasu, is a respected yet enigmatic figure whose outward godlike nature hides a darker side. In his childhood, Vasu caused the death of his friend Babu due to his possessiveness over Kasthuri, a tragic act that haunts him with guilt and a yearning for meaningful relationships. Meanwhile, Bhadrayya, Vasu's cunning manager, plots to seize Vasu's wealth by marrying his daughter Subhadra to him. Bhadrayya has two children, Krishna and Subhadra, and uses their status to manipulate situations for his benefit.

During this time, Vasu meets Hari, a brilliant student, and is deeply moved by his loyalty and dedication, forming a close bond with him. Subhadra, however, has feelings for Hari, but he rejects her as his heart belongs to Maya, a mysterious woman who is later revealed to be Kasthuri, the daughter of Subbayya, Vasu’s clerk. Vasu encounters Kasthuri and falls in love with her at first sight, unaware of her connection to his past. Simultaneously, Kasthuri's elder sister Kalyani is in love with Krishna. When Bhadrayya objects to their union citing a difference in status, Vasu intervenes and arranges Krishna and Kalyani's marriage.

Vasu later confesses his love for Kasthuri to Hari, who agrees to mediate the match. However, Hari is stunned to learn that Maya and Kasthuri are the same person. Out of gratitude toward Vasu, Hari and Kasthuri decide to sacrifice their love. Vasu and Kasthuri become engaged, but Bhadrayya, resentful of Vasu's interference, schemes to harm Kasthuri. When Vasu is injured while protecting her, Kasthuri begins to revere him as a deity, even as he reveals his darker, violent nature.

Manipulating Vasu’s insecurities, Bhadrayya poisons his mind with doubts about Hari and Kasthuri’s relationship, awakening Vasu’s vengeful side. In a fit of rage, Vasu attempts to kill Hari by pushing him off a cliff. However, he soon realizes the depth of Hari and Kasthuri’s loyalty and their sacrifice. Overcome with guilt, Vasu attempts to take his own life by jumping into the sea.

Vasu is rescued by a devout man named Ramadasu, who helps him recover and regain his strength. Determined to atone for his past, Vasu decides to unite Hari and Kasthuri. On their wedding day, Vasu discovers that Subhadra has taken Kasthuri’s place as the bride, and Kasthuri is now considered his widow. Devastated, Kasthuri declares her intent to end her life by jumping off the same cliff where Vasu tried to kill Hari. Vasu saves her, and the two reconcile. The story concludes with the marriage of Vasu and Kasthuri.

== Cast ==
- N. T. Rama Rao as Srinivasa Rao / Vaasu
- Krishna Kumari as Kasthuri
- Jaggayya as Hari
- V. Nagayya as Subbayya
- Relangi as Krishna
- Ramana Reddy as Bhadrayya
- Mikkilineni as Ramadasu
- Girija as Kalyani
- Santha Kumari as Hari's mother
- Vasanthi as Subhadra

== Music ==
Music was composed by Ghantasala.

Song title	Lyrics	Singers	length
"Neeli Kannula"	C. Narayana Reddy	P. B. Srinivas, P. Susheela	4:07
"Nee Kanu Doyini"	Narla Chiranjeevi	S. Janaki	3:24
"Doorana Neeli Meghalu"	Aarudhra	P. Susheela	3:53
"Evarikivaarau"	Acharya Aatreya	Ghantasala	3:46
"Neelona Nanne"	Dasaradhi	Ghantasala	3:43
"Janmamettiti Raa"	Anisetty	Ghantasala	4:55

== Awards ==
Nandi Awards

- Third Best Feature Film - Bronze - Nehata & Doondi (1964)
