= Rakta Sambandham =

1962 film directed by V. Madhusudhana Rao

- Theatrical release poster
- Directed by: V. Madhusudhana Rao
- Screenplay by: Mullapudi Venkata Ramana
- Based on: Pasamalar (Tamil)(1961) by A. Bhimsingh
- Produced by: Doondi; Sundarlal Nahata
- Starring: N. T. Rama Rao; Kanta Rao; Savitri; Devika
- Cinematography: C. Nageswara Rao
- Edited by: N. S. Prakasham
- Music by: Ghantasala
- Production company: Rajalakshmi Productions
- Distributed by: East India Film Company
- Release date: 1 November 1962
- Running time: 144 minutes
- Country: India
- Language: Telugu

Rakta Sambandham (transl. A bond of blood) is a 1962 Indian Telugu-language drama film directed by V. Madhusudhana Rao and produced by Sundarlal Nahata and Doondi. The film stars N. T. Rama Rao, Kanta Rao, Savitri and Devika, with Relangi, Ramana Reddy, M. Prabhakar Reddy and Suryakantham in supporting roles. A remake of A. Bhimsingh's Tamil-language film Pasamalar (1961), it narrates the story of bonding between Rajasekhar "Raju" and his sister Radha, who lose their parents at an early age. Radha falls in love with Raju's friend Anand and they marry. The rest of the film focuses on the impact made by Anand's aunt Kanthamma on their lives post marriage.

Produced on a restricted budget and filmed majorly in sets erected at Golden Film Studios and Vijaya Vauhini Studios, Rakta Sambandham's screenplay was written by Mullapudi Venkata Ramana. Ghantasala composed the soundtrack and background score. C. Nageswara Rao and N. S. Prakasham served as the director of photography and editor respectively. Krishna Rao was the art director.

Rakta Sambandham was released on 1 November 1962 and received positive reviews from the critics, who praised the performances of the cast, Ramana's screenplay and Madhusudhan Rao's direction in particular. The film was commercially successful, completing a 100-day run in 11 centers and over 25 weeks in Vijayawada, making it a silver jubilee film. It was re-released in 1988 and was well received.

== Plot ==
Rajasekhar "Raju" becomes the guardian of his younger sister Radha after their parent's death. The brother-sister duo love, care, adore each other, and are inseparable. He works at a local mill run for daily wages. One day, an accident hurts Radha when Anand, Raju's co-worker at the mill, tends to her injuries. Raju is happy to know this and befriends Anand.

Due to a labor problem, the mill shut down, and Radha gave a depressed Raju one thousand rupees, which she had saved earlier. She advises him to use this money as seed capital and begin his toy business. Raju follows her advice, starts a business, and buys the mill. Anand, who returned to the city after a legal dispute at his village, is jobless and approaches Raju for work. Raju appoints him in his concern, and over some time, Anand and Radha fall in love. Raju, who is very possessive of his sister, gets angry with Anand as he feels betrayed. However, knowing how intensely Radha loves Anand, he arranges for their wedding.

After the marriage, Anand, along with his aunt Kanthamma and cousin Apparao, moves into Raju's house. Raju marries Malathi, a doctor, at Radha's suggestion. They all continue to live under the same roof, and several misunderstandings arise. Kanthamma uses every opportunity to widen the rift between the couples. Unable to witness Radha's troubles, Raju moves out of the house with his wife.

Kanthamma serves legal notice to Raju, demanding a share in the property for Radha. Meanwhile, Anand contests Raju in the local government elections. To avoid further issues, Raju withdraws his nomination. Still, the families do not unite. Radha delivers a boy, and Malathi provides a girl. After her child's birth, Malathi dies, leaving Raju heartbroken. Anand goes to meet Raju, but Malathi's brother Bhaskar expels him, who holds him responsible for his sister's plight. Unable to cope with the separation from his sister and to have peace of mind, Raju goes on a pilgrimage for several months. He donates the entire property to Radha and sends the papers through a lawyer before leaving.

Raju returns on Diwali day and steps to meet Radha, but Kanthamma hinders his entrance. Devastated, Raju turns around when he saves a boy from getting burnt by firecrackers and, in the process, loses his eyesight. Through Subbanna, Radha learns Raju has arrived and rushes to meet him. Raju realizes that the child he saved is none other than his nephew. Anand, who knew about Kanthamma's misdeeds from Apparao, ejects her from his house and rushes to Raju. Thereupon, he collapses to view both Raju & Radha holding each other’s hands.

== Cast ==
Male actors

- N. T. Rama Rao as Rajasekhar "Raju"
- Kanta Rao as Anand
- Relangi as Apparao
- Ramana Reddy as Vishwanatham
- K. V. S. Sharma as Rathnam
- M. Prabhakar Reddy as Bhaskar
- Y. V. Raju as Subbanna

Female actors

- Savitri as Radha
- Devika as Malathi
- Girija as Sita
- Suryakantham as Kanthamma

== Production ==
=== Development ===
Impressed with the commercial success of A. Bhimsingh's 1961 Tamil-language film Pasamalar (1961), Doondi and Sundarlal Nahata acquired its remake rights. They decided to remake it in Telugu for their production company Rajalakshmi Productions, but were skeptical of the film's success, as it had a very tragic story. After a delay, Nahata revived the plans and signed V. Madhusudhana Rao to direct the film. Doondi signed writer Mullapudi Venkata Ramana to work on the script. His decision was met with severe criticism, as Ramana was known for his humorous works. Ramana took it as a challenge and completed working on the film's script and shot division in a span of two weeks. To tone down the melodrama in the original, Ramana introduced two characters from his fiction works: Apparao, the chronic debtor and his love interest Sita. Both were the subject of Ramana's friend, collaborator and filmmaker Bapu's paintings.

=== Cast and crew ===
Savitri was cast as the female lead, reprising her role from Pasamalar. Nahata approached Akkineni Nageswara Rao to play the male lead, but Nageswara Rao politely rejected the proposal, saying that the audience would not accept him playing Savitri's brother, given their reputation as an on-screen romantic pair. Doondi approached N. T. Rama Rao for the same, who accepted the proposal. Kanta Rao was signed as the other male lead, played by Gemini Ganesan in the original. Devika, M. Prabhakar Reddy and Suryakantham were cast in key supporting roles. Relangi and Girija were chosen to play Apparao and Sita respectively, and Ramana Reddy was cast as the latter's father. K. V. S. Sarma and Y. V. Raju played minor roles as the factory owner and servant Subbanna respectively.

Nahata and Doondi were impressed with Viswanathan–Ramamoorthy's soundtrack and score for the original, and approached them to work on the remake. They expressed their inability due to scheduling conflicts, and instead suggested Ghantasala's name. Doondi signed Ghantasala as the film's music composer. C. Nageswara Rao served as the director of photography, and N. S. Prakasham edited the film. Krishna Rao was the film's art director.

=== Filming ===
Rakta Sambandham was majorly filmed in sets erected at Golden Film Studios and Vijaya Vauhini Studios, where the post-production activities were carried out. Doondi and Nahata wanted to wrap the film within a restricted budget. According to Madhusudhan Rao, Rakta Sambandham was physically and mentally demanding for Savitri, though she played the same role in the original. Savitri avoided using glycerol during emotional scenes and preferred method acting. As a result, she had swollen eyes and fainted on sets often. Shooting was cancelled at times due to Savitri's illness.

Suryakantham, who played the role of an abusive mother-in-law, could not bear watching Savitri struggle and used to forget her lines. She expressed her helplessness to Madhusudhan Rao and wished to walk out of the film, until Rama Rao intervened and requested to reconsider her decision. While filming an emotional scene, film producer Aluri Chakrapani visited the sets. He suggested Rama Rao to act in a subtle way; he stated that the Telugu audience would not appreciate melodramatic performances. The song "Yevaro Nannu Kavvinchi" was filmed on Kanta Rao and Savitri at Kodaikanal.

== Music ==
Ghantasala composed the film's soundtrack and background score. He was initially apprehensive about the songs as all of them were situation based, and that Viswanathan's music received critical acclaim. With Nahata's encouragement, he composed new tunes for all the songs except "Chanduruni Minchu", "Bangaru Bomma Raaveme", "Manchi Roju Vastundi" which were retained from the original. Aarudhra, Anisetty Subbarao, C. Narayana Reddy, Daasarathi and Kosaraju collaborated for the lyrics. The soundtrack was marketed by His Master's Voice and was released on 1 December 1962.

The soundtrack received positive reviews. Venkat Rao, in his review for Andhra Jyothi dated 9 November 1962, stated that Ghantasala's music was instrumental in taking the film to the next level, and praised the lyrics for the songs "Manchi Roju Vastundi", "Bangaru Bomma Raaveme" and "Yevaro Nannu Kavvinchi". Radha Krishna, writing for Andhra Prabha on 11 November 1962, opined that Ghantasala's music was "uplifting" and praised the lyricists for their contribution. Visalaandhra, in its review dated 11 November 1962, noted the songs "Idhe Rakta Sambandham", "Chanduruni Minchu" and "Bangaru Bomma Raaveme" as the finest among others in the film's soundtrack.

No.	Title	Lyrics	Singer(s)	Length
1.	"Idhe Rakta Sambandham"	Daasarathi	Ghantasala	04:11
2.	"Manchi Roju Vastundi"	Kosaraju	Ghantasala, P. Susheela, Chorus	03:04
3.	"Yevaro Nannu Kavvinchi"	C. Narayana Reddy	P. B. Sreenivas, P. SUsheela	03:00
4.	"Aakashamele Andala Raje"	C. Narayana Reddy	S. Janaki, Chorus	04:09
5.	"Bangaru Bomma Raaveme"	Aarudhra	P. Susheela, Chorus	04:01
6.	"Oho Vayyari Vadina"	Aarudhra	P. Susheela	03:44
7.	"Chanduruni Minchu"	Anisetty Subbarao	Ghantasala, P. Susheela	05:24
8.	"Allaru Mudduga"	Anisetty Subbarao	Ghantasala	01:54
Total length:				29:27

== Release ==
Rakta Sambandham was released on 1 November 1962, with an approximate total length of 15,386 feet (4,690 m) in 17 reels, and a running time of 144 minutes. The film's distribution rights were acquired by East India Film Company Private Limited. While Savitri was skeptical of the film's success owing to its melodramatic nature, Rama Rao expressed his confidence citing Ramana's screenwriting as the film's strength. Rakta Sambandham was a commercial success, completing a 100-day run in 11 centers and over 25 weeks in Vijayawada, making it a silver jubilee film. (Note: A Silver Jubilee film is one that completes a theatrical run of 25 weeks or 175 days.) During Rama Rao's tenure as the Chief minister of Andhra Pradesh, Rakta Sambandham was re-released in 1988, and completed a 100-day run in Hyderabad.

== Reception ==
The film received positive reviews from critics. Venkat Rao, in his review for Andhra Jyothi dated 9 November 1962, praised the performances of the film's cast, especially those of Rama Rao, Savitri and Kanta Rao. Venkat Rao also praised Ramana's screenplay and the emotional climax, but found the inclusion of a dance number in the second half as an unwanted addition. Radha Krishna, writing for Andhra Prabha on 11 November 1962, termed the performances of Rama Rao and Savitri as "extraordinary", and praised Ramana for his spontaneity in the dialogues. Visalaandhra, in its review dated 11 November 1962, found Rama Rao's performance in the second half more effective and moving than the one he delivered in Kalasi Vunte Kaladu Sukham (1961). The reviewer noted that the film was "technically sound" with profound writing by Ramana and deft handling by Madhusudhan Rao.

== Legacy ==
Rakta Sambandham made a significant impact on the on-screen image of Rama Rao and Savitri. The portraits of the actors used in the film later gained wide recognition and were used in public gatherings on multiple occasions. During its theatrical run, the film influenced many Telugu households to celebrate brother-sister bonding. As a mark of gratitude to Doondi, Ramana dedicated his book Cineramaneeyam Part I to him. After Rakta Sambandham, Rama Rao and Savitri acted as a romantic couple in P. S. Ramakrishna Rao's Aatma Bandhuvu (1962). Its commercial success encouraged Rama Rao to experiment further with his on-screen image.
