= G. V. N. Raju =

- Born: Bobbili, Vizianagaram, Andhra Pradesh
- Occupations: Ventriloquist, puppeteer, mimicry artist, writer, speaker
- Notable work: 101 Sins on Public Speaking; Upanyasa Kala
- Website: www.gvnraju.com

G. V. N. Raju is an Indian ventriloquist, puppeteer, mimicry artist, author and soft skill trainer. He is the Vice President of Icon HRD, a human resource development company based in Hyderabad. He is Limca Book of Records holder in ventriloquism.

== Early life and education ==
GVN Raju is a post-graduate in Sociology and Business Management, a law graduate and has also other postgraduate diplomas to his credit.

== Career ==
G. V. N. Raju was invited to perform his ventriloquism show during the visit of Diana, Princess of Wales, as he performed a show for UNICEF for getting awareness on Universal Immunisation.

Raju, who worked in postal department of Central Government of India, has been performing mimicry and ventriloquism since 1982 and so far held 5000 shows in India and abroad including United States, Canada, Thailand, China, Nepal, the Netherlands, Switzerland, London, Belgium, Italy, Germany, France, Dubai and Abu Dhabi . He is disciple of Padmasree Dr. Nerella Venumadhaved

== Record ==
G. V. N. Raju holds a record in Limca Book of Records in 2002 for conducting a 12-hour nonstop show on 17 April 2001, with his puppet, before the audience at Thyagaraya Gana Sabha from 7:20 am to 7:20 pm. Raju's show focused on importance of adopting safe practice and shedding misconception about AIDS. Although the message was serious but was delivered in a simple way, to keep the session lively he imitated the voice of many cine actors and personalities.

== Books ==
- 101 Sins on Public Speaking (2013)
- Upanyasa Kala

== Recognition ==
- Entered in Limca Book of Records in 2002.
