= Madhusudhan Rao =

Madhusudhan Rao may refer to:

- V. Madhusudhana Rao (1923–2012), Indian film director, producer and screenwriter
- Madhusudhan Rao (actor), Indian actor
