= Aastiparulu =

- Theatrical release poster
- Directed by: V. Madhusudhana Rao
- Written by: Acharya Aatreya (dialogues)
- Produced by: V. B. Rajendra Prasad
- Starring: Akkineni Nageswara Rao; Jayalalitha
- Cinematography: C. Nageswara Rao
- Edited by: A. Sanjeevi
- Music by: K. V. Mahadevan
- Production company: Jagapathi Art Productions
- Release date: 18 November 1966
- Running time: 152 minutes
- Country: India
- Language: Telugu

Aastiparulu (transl. Wealthy people) is a 1966 Indian Telugu-language drama film, produced by V. B. Rajendra Prasad and directed by V. Madhusudhana Rao. It stars Akkineni Nageswara Rao and Jayalalithaa, with music composed by K. V. Mahadevan. The film was remade in Tamil as En Thambi and in Hindi as Bhai Ho To Aisa. The storyline was also an inspiration for the 2008 Telugu film King (2008).

== Cast ==
- Akkineni Nageswara Rao as Krishna / Seenu
- Jayalalitha as Radha
- Jaggayya as Bhaskar "Bachi"
- Gummadi as Zamindar Jannardhan Rao
- V. Nagayya as Diwanji
- Relangi as Prasadam
- Chadalavada as Miriyala Parathpara Rao
- Vanisri as Special appearance
- G. Varalakshmi as Rajyalakshmi
- Suryakantam as Kasulamma
- Girija as Varam
- Baby Padmini as Ammalu

== Soundtrack ==
Aastiparulu

Film score by K. V. Mahadevan
- Released: 1966
- Genre: Soundtrack
- Length: 25:03
- Producer: K. V. Mahadevan

K. V. Mahadevan chronology
Antastulu (1965)	Aastiparulu (1966)	Dr. Anand (1966)

Music composed by K. V. Mahadevan. The song "Soggade Chinni Nayana" was used as the title of a 2016 film.

S. No.	Song title	Lyrics	Singers	length
1	"Andariki Teliyanidi"	Acharya Aatreya	Ghantasala, P. Susheela	3:42
2	"Chali Chali Chali"	Acharya Aatreya	Ghantasala, P. Susheela	4:21
3	"Soggade Chinni Nayana"	Kosaraju	P. Susheela	3:01
4	"Chitti Ammalu Chinni Nannalu"	Acharya Aatreya	Ghantasala	3:24
5	"Erra Errani Buggaladana"	Acharya Aatreya	Ghantasala, P. Susheela	4:27
6	"Magavadivale Egaresukupo"	Acharya Aatreya	P. Susheela	3:49
7	"Midisi Padaku"	Kosaraju	Ghantasala	3:19

== Accolades ==
- Filmfare Award for Best Film – Telugu – V. B. Rajendra Prasad (1966)
- Nandi Award for Third Best Feature Film - Bronze (1966)
