= Veerabhimanyu =

- Theatrical release poster
- Directed by: V. Madhusudhana Rao
- Written by: Samudrala Sr (dialogues)
- Produced by: Sunderlal Nahta; Doondi
- Starring: N. T. Rama Rao; Sobhan Babu; Kanchana
- Cinematography: Ravikant Nagaich
- Edited by: N. S. Prakasham
- Music by: K. V. Mahadevan
- Production company: Rajalakshmi Productions
- Release date: 12 August 1965
- Running time: 182 mins
- Country: India
- Language: Telugu

Veerabhimanyu is a 1965 Indian Telugu-language Hindu mythological film produced by Sunderlal Nahta and Doondi and directed by V. Madhusudhana Rao. It stars N. T. Rama Rao, Sobhan Babu and Kanchana, with music composed by K. V. Mahadevan. The film was a box office success. It was simultaneously filmed in Tamil as Veera Abhimanyu, with a slightly different cast. The climax scene was shot in Eastmancolor. The film is considered a breakthrough for Sobhan Babu.

== Cast ==
- N. T. Rama Rao as Krishna
- Sobhan Babu as Abhimanyu
- Kanchana as Uttara
- Kanta Rao as Arjuna
- Rajanala as Duryodhana
- Mikkilineni as Indra
- Dhulipala as Dharma Raju
- Satyanarayana as Saindhava
- Padmanabham as Uttara Kumarudu
- Nelluru Kantharao as Ghatotkacha
- Dandamudi Rajagopal as Bheema
- Raavi Kondala Rao as Dronacharya
- K.V.S.Sarma as Shakuni
- G. Varalakshmi as Draupadi
- S. Varalakshmi as Subhadra
- Malathi as Sudeshna
- Sujatha as Manjula
- Geetanjali as Dancer

== Production ==
Veerabhimanyu revolves around Abhimanyu, a character in the Indian epic Mahabharata. Directed by V. Madhusudhana Rao and produced by Sunderlal Nahta and Dhoondeswara Rao under the banner Rajalakshmi Productions, it was simultaneously produced in Telugu and Tamil languages, the latter as Veera Abhimanyu, which featured a largely different cast. While Shoban Babu played Abhimanyu and N. T. Rama Rao played Krishna in Telugu, they were replaced in Tamil by A. V. M. Rajan and Gemini Ganesan, respectively. Kanchana played Uttara in both versions. Cinematography was handled by Ravi, the editing by N. S. Prakasam, and the art direction by S. Krishna Rao.

== Soundtrack ==
Veerabhimanyu

Film score by K. V. Mahadevan
- Released: 1965
- Genre: Soundtrack
- Length: 28:35
- Producer: K. V. Mahadevan

K. V. Mahadevan chronology
Thodu Needa (1965)	Veerabhimanyu (1965)	Dr. Anand (1965)

Music composed by K. V. Mahadevan.

S. No.	Song title	Lyrics	Singers	length
1	"Pavitranaya Saadhunam"	Tikkana	Ghantasala	0:35
2	"Rambha Urvashi Taladanne"	Aarudhra	Ghantasala, P. Susheela	3:17
3	"Taakina Chota"	Dasaradhi	P. Susheela	4:59
4	"Adigo Navalokam"	Aarudhra	Ghantasala, P. Susheela	4:02
5	"Choochi Valachi"	Aarudhra	Ghantasala, P. Susheela	4:23
6	"Kalla Kapatam"	Samudrala Sr.	S. Janaki	5:51
7	"Challani Swaamini"	Acharya Aatreya	Ghantasala, P. Susheela	4:47
8	"Yada Yada Hai"	Tikkana	Ghantasala	0:41

== Box office ==
The film ran for more than 100 days in 12 centres in Andhra Pradesh.
