= Marapurani Katha =

- Theatrical release poster
- Directed by: V. Ramachandra Rao
- Screenplay by: V. Ramachandra Rao
- Based on: Kai Kodutha Deivam by K. S. Gopalakrishnan
- Produced by: Sundarlal Nahatha; Doondi
- Starring: Krishna; Vanisri
- Cinematography: S. Venkat Ratnam
- Edited by: N. S. Prakasam
- Music by: T. Chalapathi Rao
- Production company: Sri Productions
- Release date: 27 July 1967
- Running time: 178 minutes
- Country: India
- Language: Telugu

Marapurani Katha (transl. Unforgettable Story) is a 1967 Indian Telugu-language romantic drama film directed by V. Ramachandra Rao in his debut. A remake of the Tamil film Kai Kodutha Deivam (1964), it stars Krishna and Vanisri. The film was released on 27 July 1967.

== Plot ==
Raghu saves Ravi's life when the latter tries to kill himself out of despair. Raghu befriends Ravi, helps him get a lucrative job, and later arranges his marriage to Lata. Subsequent events complicate things for Raghu, Lata, and Ravi's sister Radha and test the bonds of trust.

== Cast ==
- Krishna
- Vanisri
- Chandra Mohan
- Kanchana
- V. Nagayya
- Raavi Kondala Rao
- Sandhya Rani
- M. V. Chalapathi Rao
- G. S. R. Murthy
- Nagabhushanam

== Production ==
The producers initially wanted to cast N. T. Rama Rao, Jaggayya and Savitri in the main roles, with V. Madhusudhana Rao as director. When these plans were dropped due to increasing production cost, Krishna, Vanisri and Chandra Mohan were cast instead, with V. Ramachandra Rao making his directorial debut.

== Soundtrack ==
The music was composed by T. Chalapathi Rao.

Track listing
No.	Title	Lyrics	Singer(s)	Length
1.	"Uliki Uliki Chilipi Navvulolike Papa"	Kodakandla Appalacharya	B. Vasantha, Chorus
2.	"Hello Nilu Nilu Naa Kosam"	C. Narayana Reddy	P. Susheela, T. R. Jayadev
3.	"Ganga Yamuna Tarangalato"	Kosaraju	Ghantasala
4.	"Kalyaname Vaibogame"	Aarudra	P. Susheela
5.	"Nootikokka Manase Kovela"	Aarudra	Ghantasala

== Bibliography ==
- Elley, Derek (1977). World Filmography: 1967. Fairleigh Dickinson University Press. ISBN 978-0-498-01565-6.
