= Doondi =

Indian film producer (1932–2007)

- పోతిన డూండేశ్వరరావు (డూండీ)
- Born: Pothina Doondeswara Rao; 9 June 1932; Vijayawada, British India (now Andhra Pradesh, India)
- Died: 1 January 2007 (aged 74); Visakhapatnam, Andhra Pradesh, India
- Occupation: Film producer
- Spouse: Pothina Lakshmi

Pothina Doondeswara Rao (9 June 1932 – 1 January 2007), popularly known as Doondi or Dhoondy, was an Indian film producer and director noted for his work in Telugu cinema. His career spanned from the 1950s to the mid-1970s, during which he produced over 60 films in Telugu, Hindi, Kannada, and Tamil languages. In 2005, Doondi served as the Chairman of the Nandi Awards Committee.

Doondi’s father, Pothina Srinivasa Rao, was the founder of Maruthi Talkies, the first cinema hall in Andhra Pradesh, which began operations in 1921. Doondi produced notable films such as Rakta Sambandham (1962), Bandipotu (1963), Veerabhimanyu (1965), Gudachari 116 (1966), Marapurani Katha (1967) and Chelleli Kosam (1968). Gudachari 116 was particularly influential, introducing the spy genre to Telugu cinema and elevating actor Krishna to stardom.

In addition to his work in Telugu cinema, Doondi played a significant role in the careers of actors in other languages. He helped stabilize the careers of Hindi actors like Jeetendra and Amitabh Bachchan through successful remakes of southern films.

== Early life ==
Doondi was born as Pothina Doondeswara Rao into an affluent family with a significant legacy in the film industry. His father, Pothina Srinivasa Rao, founded Maruthi Talkies in 1921, the first permanent movie theatre in Andhra Pradesh. His eldest brother, Surendranath Banerjee, was a contemporary of the actor N. T. Rama Rao. Doondeswara Rao, the second son of Srinivasa Rao, became a prominent producer in the Telugu film industry, earning recognition by his moniker, Doondi. His youngest brother, Babji, also pursued a career in film production.

== Career ==
Doondi's career began with the successful dubbing of the Tamil film Kondaveeti Donga into Telugu in 1958, which became a major hit. Later, Doondi produced the films Khaidi Kannayya (1962) and Rakta Sambandham (1962). In 1963, he produced Bandipotu in Telugu and Veera Kesari in Kannada simultaneously, directed by B. Vittalacharya. In 1964, he produced Gudi Gantalu.

Doondi introduced significant talents to the industry, such as writer and director Mullapudi Venkata Ramana with Rakta Sambandham (1962), and gave Sobhan Babu a star status with Veerabhimanyu (1965). He also produced Gudachari 116 (1966), which was later remade in Tamil as Ragasiya Police 115. Doondi is recognized for bringing the spy genre to Telugu cinema. Other notable films include Chelleli Kosam (1968) and Aasthulu Anthasthulu (1969) with Krishna. He also produced films under Trimurthy Productions with his cousin Babji, including Marapurani Katha (1967), Bhale Dongalu (1977), and Dongala Veta (1978).

Doondi was influential in adapting South Indian films for Hindi audiences, producing Farz (1967) with Sunderlal Nahata, which was a remake of Gudachari 116 and helped establish Jeetendra's career. He also produced Pyar Ki Kahani (1971), one of the early films in Amitabh Bachchan's career. His later works include Sahhas (1981) and Mausam (1975), which won National Awards for Best Actress and Second Best Film. He was also a presenter for films such as Himmat (1970) and Keemat (1973). Ratha Chakralu was his last credited film before his death in 2007.

In addition to producing, Doondi directed films including Abhimanavati (1975) in Telugu and Adha Din Aadhi Raat (1977) in Hindi.

== Collaborators ==
Doondi had a partnership with Sunderlal Nahata who was like a father to Doondi, the father of film producer Srikant Nahata and father-in-law of actress Jayaprada. Doondi produced over 20 films with Krishna, including the successful Gudachari 116 (1966).

== Death ==
Doondi died on 1 January 2007 in Visakhapatnam at the age of 74 due to cancer. He was survived by his wife, Pothina Lakshmi, and his children.

== Filmography ==
=== Production ===
- Khaidi Kannayya (1962)
- Rakta Sambandham (1962)
- Bandipotu (1963)
- Veera Kesari (1963)
- Gudi Gantalu (1964)
- Veerabhimanyu (1965)
- Veera Abhimanyu (1965)
- Gudachari 116 (1966)
- Marapurani Katha (1967)
- Chelleli Kosam (1968)
- Aasthulu Anthasthulu (1969)
- Jigri Dost (1969)
- Gooduputani (1972)
- Bhale Dongalu (1977)
- Dongala Veta (1978)
- Farz (1967) (Hindi)
- Pyar Ki Kahani (1971) (Hindi)
- Sahhas (1981) (Hindi)
- Mausam (1975) (Hindi)
- Himmat (1970) (Presenter) (Hindi)
- Keemat (1973) (Presenter) (Hindi)
- Dongalu Baboi Dongalu (1984) (Presenter)
- Ratha Chakralu (2007)

=== Direction ===
- Abhimanavati (1975)
- Adha Din Aadhi Raat (1977)
