= Mallepoovu =

- Directed by: V. Madhusudan Rao
- Starring: Sobhan Babu; Jayasudha; Lakshmi
- Music by: K. Chakravarthy
- Release date: 26 July 1978
- Country: India
- Language: Telugu

Mallepoovu or Malle Poovu is a 1978 Telugu-language drama film directed by V. Madhusudan Rao. It is remake of 1957 Hindi film Pyaasa produced and directed by Guru Dutt.

It is musical film with lyrics penned by Veturi and Arudra and music scored by K. Chakravarthy. The songs are voiced by P. Susheela, S. P. Balasubrahmanyam and Vani Jayaram.

== Plot ==
The plot follows the story of an unsuccessful poet who is deemed as useless by the society.

== Cast ==
- Shobhan Babu
- Jayasudha
- Lakshmi
- Rao Gopal Rao
- Sridhar
- Mada Venkateswara Rao
- Mallikarjuna Rao
- P. J. Sharma
- Suthi Veerabhadra Rao
- Girl Babu
- Chalam
- Allu Ramalingaiah
- Potti Prasad
- Pandaribai
- K Vijaya

== Soundtrack ==
- "Mallepoovula Vasantham Maa Thotakochindi" (Lyrics: Veturi; Singer: S. P. Balasubrahmanyam; Cast: Sobhan Babu)
- "Chaka Chaka Saage Chakkani Bullemma" (Lyrics: Veeturi; Singer: S. P. Balasubrahmanyam, P. Susheela; Cast: Sobhan Babu, Jayasudha)
- "Chinna Maata Oka Chinna Maata" (Lyrics: Veturi; Singer: P. Susheela; Cast: Lakshmi, Sobhan Babu)
- "Evvaro Evvaro Ee Neraaladigevarevvaro" (Lyrics: Veturi; Singer: S. P. Balasubrahmanyam; Cast: Sobhan Babu)
- "Nuvvu Vasthavani Brundhavani Aasaga Choosenayya Krishnayya" (Lyrics: Veeturi; Singer: Vani Jayaram; Cast: Lakshmi, Pandari Bai, Sobhan Babu)
- "Oho Oho Lalitha Naa Prema Kavitha" (Lyrics: Veturi; Singer: S. P. Balasubrahmanyam, P. Susheela; Cast: Sobhan Babu, Jayasudha)
- "O Priya Marumalliya Kanna Thellanidhi" (Lyrics: Arudra; Singer: S.P.Balasubramanyam; Cast: Sobhanbabu, Jayasudha)
- "Evariki Telusu Chithikina Manasu" (Lyrics: Veturi; Singer: S.P.Balasubramanyam; Cast: Sobhanbabu, Jayasudha, Sridhar)
- "Jumbamba Jumbamba Bamba Bamba Jum" (Lyrics: Arudra; Singer: K. Chakravarthy; Cast : Raogopalarao)
- "Brathikunna Chachinatte Ee Sanghamlo" (Lyrics: Acharya Aatreya; Singer: S. P. Balasubrahmanyam, V. Ramakrishna, P. Susheela; Cast : Sobhan Babu, Sridhar, Lakshmi, Jayasudha, Rao Gopalarao)

== Box office ==
- The film ran for 100 days in Visakhapatnam.
