= Aathma Balam =

1964 film

- Theatrical release poster
- Directed by: V. Madhusudhana Rao
- Written by: Acharya Aatreya (dialogues)
- Screenplay by: V. Madhusudhana Rao
- Story by: Binoy Chatterji
- Based on: Agni Sanskar (1961)
- Produced by: V. B. Rajendra Prasad
- Starring: Akkineni Nageswara Rao; Jaggayya; B.Saroja Devi
- Cinematography: C. Nageswara Rao
- Edited by: Akkineni Sanjeevi
- Music by: K. V. Mahadevan
- Production company: Jagapathi Art Pictures
- Distributed by: Vani Films
- Release date: 9 January 1964
- Running time: 167 mins
- Country: India
- Language: Telugu

Aathma Balam (transl. Power of the Soul) is a 1964 Indian Telugu-language romantic thriller film directed by V. Madhusudhana Rao and produced by V. B. Rajendra Prasad. The film stars Akkineni Nageswara Rao, Jaggayya, B.Saroja Devi and music composed by K. V. Mahadevan. It is a Telugu adaptation to Agradoot's Bengali film Agni Sanskar (1961).

== Cast ==
- Akkineni Nageswara Rao as Anand
- B. Saroja Devi as Jaya
- Jaggayya as Kumar
- Gummadi as Dr. Seth
- V. Nagayya as Sundaram
- Relangi as Kuramavataram
- Ramana Reddy as Manager Mangapathi
- Chadalavada as Anand's father
- Suryakantham as Rangamma
- Kannamba as Jagadeeswaramma
- Hemalatha as Parvathamma
- Girija as Chitti

== Soundtrack ==
Music was composed by K. V. Mahadevan. Lyrics were written by Acharya Aatreya.

S. No.	Song title	Singers	length
1	"Chita Pata Chinukulu"	Ghantasala, P. Susheela	3:49
2	"Gilligajalu"	Ghantasala, P. Susheela	3:59
3	"Ekkadiki Potavu Chinnavaada"	Ghantasala, P. Susheela	5:29
4	"Parugulu Teese"	Ghantasala, P. Susheela	4:56
5	"Tellavaaraneeku Ee Reyini"	Ghantasala, P. Susheela	3:41
6	"Naalugu Kallu Rendu Ayinayi"	P. Susheela	3:37
7	"Naalugu Kallu Rendu Ayinayi"	Ghantasala, Jamuna Rani	3:29
8	"Ramzu Ramzu"	Ghantasala, P. Susheela	3:15
