= Vichitra Jeevitham =

Indian Telugu-language drama film

- Theatrical release poster
- Directed by: V. Madhusudhana Rao
- Written by: Bollimuntha Sivaramakrishna (dialogues)
- Screenplay by: V. Madhusudhana Rao
- Story by: Gulshan Nanda
- Based on: The Mayor of Casterbridge by Thomas Hardy
- Produced by: Nidamarthi Padmakshi; N. Pushpa Bhatt
- Starring: Akkineni Nageswara Rao; Vanisri; Jayasudha
- Cinematography: V. S. R. Swamy
- Edited by: D. Venkataratnam
- Music by: Chakravarthy
- Production company: Sri Umalakshmi Combines
- Release date: 14 April 1978
- Running time: 134 minutes
- Country: India
- Language: Telugu

Vichitra Jeevitham (transl. Strange Life) is a 1978 Indian Telugu-language drama film directed by V. Madhusudhana Rao. The film stars Akkineni Nageswara Rao, Vanisri and Jayasudha, with music composed by Chakravarthy. It is a remake of the Hindi film Daag (1973), which itself is based on Thomas Hardy's 1886 novel The Mayor of Casterbridge. The film was released on 14 April 1978.

== Cast ==
- Akkineni Nageswara Rao as Chandra Shekar
- Vanisri as Gowri
- Jayasudha as Ganga
- Mohan Babu as Surendra Nath
- Jaggayya as Inspector Anand
- Gummadi as Visweswaraiah
- Nagabhushanam as Jananatham
- Dhulipala as Lawyer
- Kakarala as Lawyer
- Rama Prabha as Jaganatham's wife
- Radha Kumari as Principal
- Jaya Malini as item number

== Soundtrack ==
The music was composed by Chakravarthy.

Song title	Lyrics	Singers	length
"Inaalla Ee Mooga Baada"	C. Narayana Reddy	S. P. Balasubrahmanyam	4:33
"Banginapalli Maamidipandu"	Veturi	S. P. Balasubrahmanyam, P. Susheela	4:26
"Naa Kosam"	Dasaradhi	S. P. Balasubrahmanyam, P. Susheela	4:28
"Allibilli Chittipapa"	Aarudhra	P. Susheela	4:36
"O Chandrama"	Veturi	P. Susheela	3:51
"Gummadamma Gummadamma"	Veeturi	P. Susheela, Jikki	4:18
