= Anandavani =

- Type: News magazine
- Founded: 1939
- Language: Telugu
- Headquarters: Hyderabad, India

Anandavani (ఆనందవాణి) was a popular Telugu magazine.

== Overview ==
It was started as a weekly news magazine by Vuppuluri Kalidas in 1939. The first issue was released on 2 January, with a cover page depicting Rajaji. The magazine became very popular during the pre-independence period. Malladi, Sripada, Munimanikyam, Sri Sri, Arudra, and many others contributed regularly. There used to be lively discussions on many social and political issues supporting Indian independence movement.

The magazine was converted into a monthly publication in 1945. The head office was relocated to Hyderabad in 1960.

Srirangam Srinivasa Rao organized the popular columns Varam Varam and Gallanudikattu, while Ravuri Venkata Satyanarayana Rao contributed to the Kappu Coffee features. Vyasa Publishing House contributed editions of the Ramayana, Mahabharata, and Bhagavatam written by C. Rajagopalachari. Renowned editor M. Chalapati Rao authored the All-in-All column under the title Endaro Mahanubhavulu.

Arudra, Mahankali Srirama Murthy, Andhra Seshagiri Rao, Mudda Viswanadham, Srinivasa Shiromani, Vadali Mandeswara Rao and others served on the editorial board at different times.
