= Aalayamani =

1962 film by K. Shankar

- Theatrical release poster
- Directed by: K. Shankar
- Screenplay by: Javar Seetharaman
- Story by: G. Balasubramaniam
- Produced by: P. S. Veerappa
- Starring: Sivaji Ganesan; B. Saroja Devi; S. S. Rajendran; C. R. Vijayakumari
- Cinematography: Thambu
- Edited by: K. Shankar; K. Narayanan
- Music by: Viswanathan–Ramamoorthy
- Production company: P. S. V. Pictures
- Release date: 23 November 1962
- Running time: 154 minutes
- Country: India
- Language: Tamil

Aalayamani (transl. Temple bell) is a 1962 Indian Tamil-language drama film directed by K. Shankar and produced by P. S. Veerappa. The film stars Sivaji Ganesan, S. S. Rajendran, B. Saroja Devi and C. R. Vijayakumari. It was released on 23 November 1962, and ran for over 100 days in theatres. The film was remade in Telugu as Gudi Gantalu (1964), in Hindi as Aadmi (1968) and in Malayalam as Oru Raagam Pala Thaalam.

== Plot ==
Thyagarajan "Thyagu" is a lonely rich bachelor, subjected to a deep-seated trauma from having witnessed the death of a childhood playmate, caused by his possessiveness. This is recurring theme in Thyagarajan's life, leading to disastrous results.

The movie begins with an imposing bell being rung, a voice narrates the story of a poor man, Arumugam Pillai, who was about to commit suicide on the death rock, but is stopped by the sound of the divine bell from the temple. He decides to take another chance with his life and soon he becomes a rich man and his son is none other than Thyagu, our hero!

Thyagarajan meets and becomes close friends with a virtuous man named Sekhar and mutual admiration and fondness grows amongst the friends. Sekhar and Meena are in love and Sekhar promises he will ask her hand in marriage. Unbeknownst to both of them, Thyagu comes across Meena, whose father Muthaiah Pillai works in Thyagu's estate and impressed by her vivacity, Thyagu falls head over heels for her. This has all the makings of a typical love triangle.

Meena has a sister, Pushpalatha, who falls in love with Aatkondan Pillai's son who demands a large amount in dowry. Muthaiah Pillai is unable to come up with the requisite cash and is now concerned about the fate of his elder daughter's marriage. Thyagu comes helping with the cash and they are wed. Shortly thereafter, Thyagu proposes to marry Meena and sends Sekhar as his messenger.

Except Sekhar and Meena, to their obvious shock and despair, it looks to the rest of the relatives that Thyagu and Meena are a pair made for each other. Sekhar, realising the extent of love and the depth of feelings of Thyagu asks Meena to forgo their feelings and that she should go ahead and marry Thyagu. Members of both the families get together and agree to the arrangement. By this time, Thyagu, injured in a serious accident loses the use of both his legs and ends up being a cripple for life. The loyal partner Meena pitches into the effort to care for Thyagu and spends all her time caring for him.

Sekhar cannot forget Meena and tries to be close with her, while she honours her commitment to Thyagu and keeps Sekhar at a distance. Thinking Sekhar as a single, Prema, daughter of the Aatkondan Pillai, expresses her feelings for Sekhar and he fails to respond in kind.

The characters' pent up emotions of love, friendship, loyalty, jealousy and physical debilitation boil over at one point and things take a turn for the worse for all three. Guided by the feelings of inadequacy, Thyagu builds in his mind a picture, that his dear friend Sekhar is out to get his love, and decides to take matters into his hands and get rid of Sekhar. The lingering doubts about his friend and lover is now fuelled by his restive passions which are burning brightly.

Thyagu plans that the appropriate location for revenge is the Death rock known for its enchanting scenery and dangerous cliffs, where once his father attempted suicide. He was to drive Sekhar to the edge and push him to death from the face of the cliff. Thyagu leads Sekhar to the cliff and reveals his anger and frustration about their perceived relationship, questioning the sincerity of his friend and his lover. A visibly angered Sekhar repulses by revealing the magnitude of his sacrifice he made for his close friend and to prove his innocence, Sekhar swears to take his own life from the same Death rock. Truth dawns on Thyagu, now deeply humiliated, jumps from the cliff to the tumultuous sea below.

While Sekhar and Meena are mourning for their loss, Thyagu gets rescued by a fisherman and the shock of falling from the cliff has given back Thyagu the partial use of his legs. Meena now deems her as a widow and convinces Sekhar to marry the girl who loves him. On the wedding day, Thyagu, now dressed as a nobody shows up for the wedding and happens to overhear a conversation of Meena declaring that there is no life and happiness left due to Thyagu's death. This convinces Thyagu to reveal his identity and console Saroja, while Aatkondan Pillai with an eye on Thyagu's money thinks otherwise. Thyagu is hit on the head and falls unconscious, the marriage completes and Meena decides to take her life from the same cliff Thyagu plunged to death and seen running towards the cliff. Conscious now, Thyagu goes after Meena to stop her from committing suicide, calling out loud to stop and limping all the way behind her.

Meena sees Thyagu is alive and changes her mind and the lovers unite. In the background, the song "Ponnai Virumbum Boomiyile" (meaning: In a world of wealth lovers, the dear one who loved me) is being played, a happy Thyagu and Meena waves us a farewell, the movie ends.

== Cast ==
- Sivaji Ganesan as Thyagarajan "Thyagu"
- B. Saroja Devi as Meena/Vanampadi
- S. S. Rajendran as Sekar
- C. R. Vijayakumari as Prema
- P. S. Veerappa as Pakkiri
- M. R. Radha as Aatkondan Pillai
- M. V. Rajamma as Sekar's mother
- Pushpalatha as Parvathi
- T. R. Ramachandran as Aatkondan Pillai's son
- V. Nagayya as Muthaiah Pillai
- V. S. Raghavan as Doctor
- C. R. Parthiban as Doctor
- K. Natarajan as Thyagu's manager
- Master Sridhar as young Thyagu
- Master Mohan as young Babu

== Production ==
The scene where Ganesan and Rajendran play tennis was shot at Egmore Tennis Stadium.

== Soundtrack ==
The music was composed by Viswanathan–Ramamoorthy and lyrics for all songs were written by Kannadasan. The songs like "Kallellam Manikka", "Satti Suthadhada" and "Ponnai Virumbum" were well received. Philips, an autodidact guitarist, played the guitar for "Satti Sutthadhada". It was based on the raga Bilaskhan-i Todi. The song "Kallellam Maanikka" is based on Mayamalavagowla raga, but also has an Arabic tinge. Writing for The New Indian Express, Sujatha Narayan noted that the song "Nallai Allai" from Kaatru Veliyidai (2017) was similar to "Ponnai Virumbum" from this film "in its mood, with the man reminiscing how his love for a woman of such character has changed him for the better."

| Song | Singers | Length |
|---|---|---|
| "Kallellam Manikka" | T. M. Soundararajan & L. R. Eswari | 05:00 |
| "Kannana Kannanukku" | Sirkazhi Govindarajan & P. Susheela | 05:10 |
| "Karunai Magan" | M. S. Viswanathan | 00:57 |
| "Maanattam" | P. Susheela | 03:36 |
| "Ponnai Virumbum" | T. M. Soundararajan | 04:03 |
| "Satti Sutthadhada" | T. M. Soundararajan | 04:21 |
| "Thookkam Un Kangalai" | S. Janaki | 03:22 |

== Release and reception ==
Aalayamani was released on 23 November 1962. The Indian Express wrote, "Aalayamani is an engrossing film, which though sometimes exceeds the bounds of possibility assures a fair return for cinegoers' fare." Kanthan of Kalki appreciated the performances of various cast members and the cinematography, but felt Vijayakumari was underutilised. The film celebrated its 100th day at the Vijaya Gardens, Kodambakkam.

== Remakes ==
Aalayamani was remade in Telugu as Gudi Gantalu (1964), in Hindi as Aadmi (1968), and in Malayalam as Oru Raagam Pala Thaalam (1979).
