= Aradhana (1962 film) =

1962 film

- Theatrical release poster
- Directed by: V. Madhusudhana Rao
- Written by: Narla Chiranjeevi; Acharya Aatreya (dialogues)
- Screenplay by: V. Madhusudhana Rao
- Based on: Sagarika by Nitai Bhattacharya
- Produced by: V. B. Rajendra Prasad; P. Ranga Rao
- Starring: Akkineni Nageswara Rao; Savitri
- Cinematography: C. Nageswara Rao
- Edited by: N. K. Gopal
- Music by: S. Rajeswara Rao
- Production company: Jagapathi Art Productions
- Release date: 16 February 1962
- Running time: 150 minutes
- Country: India
- Language: Telugu

Aradhana (transl. Devotion) is a 1962 Indian Telugu-language romance film produced by V. B. Rajendra Prasad and D. Ranga Rao, and directed by V. Madhusudhana Rao. The film stars Akkineni Nageswara Rao and Savitri, with music composed by S. Rajeswara Rao. It is a remake of the Bengali film Sagarika (1956). The film was released on 16 February 1962, and emerged a box office success.

== Cast ==
- Akkineni Nageswara Rao as Muralikrishna
- Savitri as Anuradha
- Jaggayya as Saradhi
- Gummadi as V. R. Rao
- Relangi as Yoganandam
- Ramana Reddy as Lingaiah
- Dr. Sivaramakrishnaiah as Bondam
- Rajasree as Sarala
- Girija as Lakshmi
- L. Vijayalakshmi (special appearance in the song "Emanta Emanta")

== Production ==
Aradhana is a remake of the Bengali film Sagarika (1956). The song "Ohoho Mamayya" was planned to be filmed at Madras Zoo, but as the location was not found to be visually appealing due to continuous smoke emerging from coal engines there, the song was instead filmed at Mysore Zoo. While the film was predominantly in black-and-white, this song alone was filmed in colour.

== Soundtrack ==
The music was composed by S. Rajeswara Rao. The song "Na Hrudayamlo Nidurinche Cheli" is based on "Amar Shopne Dekha Rajkkonna Thaake" from the original Bengali film.

Song title	lyrics	Singers	length
"Na Hrudayamlo Nidurinche Cheli"	Sri Sri	Ghantasala	2:27
"Nee Chelimi"	Narla Chiranjeevi	P. Susheela	3:01
"Emanta Emanta"	Kosaraju	Pithapuram, Swarnalata	3:29
"Ohoho Mamayya"	Arudra	Ghantasala, P. Susheela	3:46
"Adadani Orachupulo"	Arudra	S. Janaki	3:43
"Vennelaloni Vikasame"	Sri Sri	P. Susheela	3:12
"Englishlona Marriage"	Arudra	Ghantasala, S. Janaki	2:56

== Release ==
Aradhana was released on 16 February 1962 and emerged a box office success, running for over 100 days in theatres.

== Bibliography ==
- Rajadhyaksha, Ashish; Willemen, Paul (1998) [1994]. Encyclopaedia of Indian Cinema. British Film Institute and Oxford University Press. ISBN 0-19-563579-5.
