= Adha Din Aadhi Raat =

Aadha Din Aadhee Raat
- Directed by: Doondi
- Starring: Vinod Khanna; Shabana Azmi
- Music by: Laxmikant–Pyarelal
- Release date: 1977
- Country: India
- Language: Hindi

Aadha Din Aadhee Raat (transl. Half Day Half Night) is a 1977 Indian Hindi-language action film directed by Doondi. It is a remake of the 1972 Telugu film Manavudu Danavudu.

== Cast ==
- Vinod Khanna ... Dr. Gopal / Jagan
- Shabana Azmi ... Dr. Radha
- Asha Parekh ... Seeta
- Jayshree T. ... Laxmi
- Jalal Agha ... Raju
- Prem Chopra ... Gulshan
- Ranjeet ... Patel
- Om Shivpuri ... Kedar

== Soundtrack ==
Songs were written by Anand Bakshi and their music was composed by the duo Laxmikant Pyarelal.

#	Song	Singer
1	"Yeh Raat Ek Si Hoti Hai" (Male)	Kishore Kumar
2	"Yeh Raat Ek Si Hoti Hai" (Female)	Lata Mangeshkar
3	"Main London Chhodke Aa Gaya"	Kishore Kumar
4	"Saathi Banega, Saath Apne Chalega"	Mohammed Rafi, Asha Bhosle
5	"Ek Baar, Sirf Ek Baar Tu Jo Muskura De"	Asha Bhosle
6	"Kaahe Ko Byaahi Videsh Re Baabul"	Asha Bhosle
