= Kai Kodutha Deivam =

1964 film by K. S. Gopalakrishnan

- Theatrical release poster
- Directed by: K. S. Gopalakrishnan
- Screenplay by: K. S. Gopalakrishnan
- Story by: T. S. Mahadevan
- Produced by: M. S. Velappan
- Starring: Sivaji Ganesan; Savithri; S. S. Rajendran; K. R. Vijaya
- Cinematography: M. Karnan
- Music by: Viswanathan–Ramamoorthy
- Production company: Sri Ponni Productions
- Release date: 18 July 1964
- Running time: 164 minutes
- Country: India
- Language: Tamil

Kai Kodutha Deivam (transl. The God Who Helped) is a 1964 Indian Tamil-language romantic drama film directed by K. S. Gopalakrishnan. The film stars Sivaji Ganesan, Savitri, S. S. Rajendran and K. R. Vijaya. It was released on 18 July 1964 and became a success, winning the National Film Award for Best Feature Film in Tamil – President's silver medal. The film was remade in Telugu as Marapurani Katha (1967), in Malayalam as Palunku Pathram (1970) and in Hindi as Pyar Ki Kahani (1971).

== Plot ==
The film relates the true meaning of friendship between two youths, Raghu and Ravi. Ravi leaves his hometown in Tamil Nadu and comes to Amritsar. Here, Raghu finds him in an unconscious and takes him home. Raghu sacrifices his managerial post and gives it to Ravi. Ravi does not share his true identity or the reason for leaving home. As per his parents' wish, Raghu sees a girl to marry. However, when Ravi sees the photograph of the girl, he asks Raghu not to marry her. A shocking truth about the girl is then revealed to Raghu.

== Cast ==
- Sivaji Ganesan as Raghu
- Savithri as Kokila
- S. S. Rajendran as Ravi
- K. R. Vijaya as Latha
- M. R. Radha as Keady Varathan
- S. V. Ranga Rao as Mahadevan
- V. Nagayya as Latha's father
- Pushpalatha as Sakunthala
- S. V. Sahasranamam as Mahadevan's lawyer
- R. Balasubramaniyam as Raghu's father
- Pushpavalli as Raghu's mother
- Karikol Raju (guest role)
- Radha Bai (guest role)
- C. I. D. Sakunthala as a dancer

== Production ==
Kai Kodutha Deivam was Vijaya's second film as an actress. Ganesan helped her with dialogue delivery, at a time when dialogues were not dubbed but recorded on set.

== Soundtrack ==
The soundtrack was composed by Viswanathan–Ramamoorthy. The songs "Aayirathil Oruthi" and "Sindhu Nadhiyin" were well received. The Telugu portions of the song "Sindhunadhi" were performed by Telugu composer J. V. Raghavulu.

Track listing
No.	Title	Lyrics	Singer(s)	Length
1.	"Sindhu Nadhiyin"	Bharathiyar	T. M. Soundararajan, L. R. Eswari, J. V. Raghavulu	6:20
2.	"Aairathil Oruthiyamma"	Kannadasan	T. M. Soundararajan	3:55
3.	"Mangala Melam"	Kannadasan	P. Susheela	4:21
4.	"Kulunga Kulunga Sirikkum"	Kannadasan	P. Susheela, L. R. Eswari	3:56
Total length:				18:32

== Release and reception ==
Kai Kodutha Deivam was released on 18 July 1964. The Indian Express wrote, "[W]ith fine visual conception of story-weaving, [Gopalakrishnan] has made the film slick and enjoyable." T. M. Ramachandran wrote in Sport and Pastime, "The story has been told on the screen in a logical manner and with a fast tempo. The director has shown great imagination and understanding in preparing a well-knit screenplay". Kanthan of Kalki said the story was a "difficult subject", but appreciated the fact that all actors were given a chance to shine. The film ran successfully for 100 days in theatres in Tamil Nadu, and won the National Film Award for Best Feature Film in Tamil – President's silver medal in 1965.

== Bibliography ==
- Dhananjayan, G. (2014). Pride of Tamil Cinema: 1931–2013. Blue Ocean Publishers. OCLC 898765509.
- Ganesan, Sivaji; Narayana Swamy, T. S. (2007) [2002]. Autobiography of an Actor: Sivaji Ganesan, October 1928 – July 2001. Sivaji Prabhu Charities Trust. OCLC 297212002.
- Rajadhyaksha, Ashish; Willemen, Paul (1998) [1994]. Encyclopaedia of Indian Cinema. British Film Institute and Oxford University Press. ISBN 0-19-563579-5.
