= En Thambi =

1968 Indian Tamil film by A. C. Tirulokchandar

- Poster
- Directed by: A. C. Tirulokchandar
- Written by: A. L. Narayanan (dialogues)
- Screenplay by: A. C. Tirulokchandar
- Story by: Jagapathy Picture Story Department
- Based on: (Thambi Stage Drama Pasam Sivakkum Story Writing Direct By K. S. Gopalakrishnan)
- Produced by: K. Balaji
- Starring: Sivaji Ganesan; B. Saroja Devi
- Cinematography: Thambu
- Edited by: B. Kanthasamy
- Music by: M. S. Viswanathan
- Production company: Sujatha Cine Arts
- Release date: 7 June 1968
- Country: India
- Language: Tamil

En Thambi (transl. My Younger Brother) is a 1968 Indian Tamil-language romantic action film directed by A. C. Tirulokchandar. The film stars Sivaji Ganesan and B. Saroja Devi, with K. Balaji and Nagesh in supporting roles. It is a remake of the 1966 Telugu film Aastiparulu Later on 1972 Hindi as Bhai Ho To Aisa. The film became a commercial success, running for over 100 days in theatres.

== Plot ==
Sundara Boopathy is a rich landlord who is widely respected by everyone in the town. Following the death of his first wife, he marries Alangaram. Kannan is Boopathy's eldest son, born to his first wife. Viswam is Kannan's half-brother. While Kannan is a good and kind hearted person taking care of all the family businesses, Viswam is a spoiled brat who just roams around spending unnecessarily. Viswam also has a hatred towards Kannan. Radha is the cousin of Kannan. Kannan and Radha are in love and the family plans to get them married.

Boopathy keeps worrying about Viswam due to his irresponsible behaviour and requests Kannan to shape him into a good human. Boopathy falls gravely ill. He summons Kannan and tells him a secret before passing away. Kannan assumes all responsibilities of running the businesses and this angers Viswam. As Kannan does not know swimming, Viswam decides to murder Kannan by pushing him into a river. Viswam takes Kannan with him in a boat and pushes him in the middle of the river and stages a drama that their boat had an accident in which Kannan died. The entire family is shocked hearing about the demise of Kannan. Viswam feels happy as he has got a free hand in spending the wealth.

Kannan's driver Sabapathy watches a stage play where he witnesses Kannan's lookalike Chinnaiya. Sabapathy devises a plan to make him act as Kannan, so that the family members could feel relieved. Sabapathy meets Chinnaiya and requests him to act as Kannan. Although Chinnaiya is not interested, he agrees to be a part of the plan. Sabapathy provides all the necessary info for Chinnaiya about Kannan's family members. Chinnaiya goes to Kannan's house and says that he is not dead. Everyone in the house feels happy except Viswam who feels suspicious about the new Kannan. Viswam tells his family members that the new person should be someone else acting in place of Kannan to steal money. But Chinnaiya clears the doubts by performing certain tasks which Kannan does on a regular basis.

Chinnaiya tries hard to make Viswam a good person, but in vain. Finally, the house members overhear Sabapathy's conversation and find out the plan. Sabapathy accepts the truth. To everyone's surprise, Chinnaiya says that he is none other than the real Kannan. He tells a flashback, where Kannan was rescued by a group of stage actors who were travelling in another boat. Kannan asked his friend to bring Sabapathy for the stage show, so that Sabapathy could see Kannan in the name of Chinnaiya. Kannan preferred to hide his true identity as he does not want Viswam to be framed for murder. Viswam tries hard to make everyone believe that he is not Kannan.

To put an end to Viswam's doubts about whether the person he killed was his deceased brother Kannan or Chinnaiya, the street theatre actor who resembles him, Viswam conducts a test. One day, while Kannan, who has assumed the name Chinnaiya, and Radha are sitting in a flower garden, Viswam, in a drastic move, thrusts a whip into Chinnaiya's hand and challenges him to prove whether he is the real Kannan or Chinnaiya. instructing him to whip and snatch the flowers from Radha's hair. perform a song dance sequence, to prove his identity as Kannan, Chinnaiya transforms into a whip-wielding sevagan, striking Radha with the whip and meticulously snatching all the flowers from her head as she sings and dances. At the end of the song, when it is revealed that is indeed he brother Kannan and not drama actor Chinnaiya, Viswam is left stunned.

Even after that To prove his identity, Kannan discloses about the secret told by his father Boopathy before death. Boopathy told Kannan about the location of jewels that belonged to his mother which was secretly hidden in a place. Kannan says this to everyone and promises that he will bring those jewels back so that he could prove his identity. Viswam follows Kannan and tries to kill him. In the fight, Viswam slips down in a well but is saved by Kannan which transforms Viswam. In the end, Kannan's identity is proved and he is also married to Radha. Viswam is transformed into a good human and Kannan feels happy that he has fulfilled his promise to his father.

== Cast ==
- Sivaji Ganesan as Kannan/Chinnaiya
- B. Saroja Devi as Radha
- K. Balaji as Viswam
- Major Sundarrajan as Sundara Boopathy
- P. Kannamba as Meenakshi
- Pandari Bai as Seethalakshmi
- M. S. Sundari Bai as Alangaram
- Javar Seetharaman as Karunakara Boopathy
- V. K. Ramasamy as Burma Singaram
- Nagesh as Sabapathy
- Madhavi as Ranjitham
- Roja Ramani as Uma
- Rajasulochana as Dancer
- P. D. Sambandam as Guest Role
- Deva Manohari as Thangam
- Rajeswari as Sumathi

== Soundtrack ==
The music was composed by M. S. Viswanathan, with lyrics by Kannadasan. The song "Muthu Nagaiye" is set in Brindavana raga.

Song	Singers	Length
"Muthu Nagaiye"	T. M. Soundararajan	03:15
"Adiyai Nettru Pirandaval"	T. M. Soundararajan, P. Susheela	03:15
"Munthi Munthi Vinayaganeya"	Sirkazhi Govindarajan, L. R. Eswari	05:52
"Ayyaiya Mella Thattu"	T. M. Soundararajan, P. Susheela	03:20
"Thattattum Kai Thazhuvattum"	L. R. Eswari, K. Balaji	03:15
"Muthu Nagaiye" (Sad)	T. M. Soundararajan	03:00

== Reception ==
Kalki criticised the film for lack of originality.
