= Farz (1967 film) =

1967 Hindi film directed by Ravikant Nagaich

- Theatrical release poster
- Directed by: Ravikant Nagaich
- Written by: Vishwamitter Adil; V. D. Puranik (dialogues)
- Screenplay by: Arudra
- Story by: Arudra
- Based on: Gudachari 116 by M. Mallikarjuna Rao
- Produced by: Sunderlal Nahata; Doondi
- Starring: Jeetendra; Babita
- Cinematography: Ravikant Nagaich
- Edited by: N. S. Prakasam
- Music by: Laxmikant Pyarelal
- Production company: Vijaya Lakhshmi Pictures
- Release date: 6 October 1967
- Running time: 170 minutes
- Country: India
- Language: Hindi

Farz (transl. Duty) is a 1967 Hindi-language spy thriller film, directed by Ravikant Nagaich and produced by Sunderlal Nahata and Dhoondy. It starred Jeetendra and Babita with music composed by Laxmikant Pyarelal. The film is a remake of the Telugu film Gudachari 116 (1966).

== Plot ==
Secret Agent 116 named Gopal has been assigned the case of homicide of a fellow secret agent (303) by the head of CID, who (303) found evidence that can help identify the perpetrators. During this investigation, Gopal meets lovely Sunita, and both end up falling in love with each other. The traitor responsible for the killing of Agent 303 has gone to meet 303's sister Kamla and tells her that he is a CID inspector and investigating his brother's case, warning that her brother's killer may attempt on her pretending as his colleague and friend. He elsewhere unsuccessfully continued on the life of agent 116. 116 goes to meet Kamla and sees 303's portrait and notes down the studio photographer's name, but Kamla is convinced that 116 is the killer of her brother. Kamla is approached by another mafia don, Damodar, for her help in eliminating 116, to which she agrees. Damodar turns out to be Sunita's father when Sunita introduces him, Gopal gets suspicious about him and commences a background check, which reveals that her father is a gangster. As he sets out his case against Damodar, he continues his romance with Sunita. During Sunita's birthday party, Damodar directs his henchman to kill 116, which 116 escapes after some car chase. 116 hesitantly reveals to Sunita that her father is a gangster. Heartbroken Sunita confronts her father, who tells her that he was forced into his life of crime and terrorism, and some other person controls them all, overheard by 116 and his assistant who are hiding outside. 116 goes out for his search for the real culprit to a skyscraper apartment where Kamla was plotted. Kamla seductively dances and mix some intoxicant pill in his drink which overlooked by 116, and acted as drunk and eventually senseless. Goons take him to their secret den in city outskirts, along with Sunita, who mistakes them as Hospital Ward boys. In the den, 116 captures one of the goon leaders and forced him to reveal some information. 116 fights his way with Sunita and escapes in a vehicle. In the meantime, CID agents trace a letter leading to clues regarding the Chinese conspiracy to destabilize the nation and accommodated by traitors inside, led by a person wearing a Mao uniform named Supremo, who only speaks a few broken English sentences. The rest of the movie follows the 116's efforts to thwart a foreign conspiracy against India.

== Cast ==
- Jeetendra as Gopal Kishan Pandey/Agent 116
- Babita as Sunita
- Sajjan as Damodar
- Agha as Shantaram
- Rajanala Kaleswara Rao as Supremo
- Mohan Choti as Nikku
- Manohar Deepak as Raju
- Mukri as Raju
- Kanchana as Kamala
- Aruna Irani as Basanti
- David Abraham Cheulkar as Chief of Secret service

== Soundtrack ==
The soundtrack was composed by Laxmikant Pyarelal and lyrics are by Anand Bakshi.

#	Title	Singer(s)	Length
1	"Aa Ja Aa Ja Mere Paas"	Asha Bhosle	4:23
2	"Dekho Dekho Ji Socho Ji"	Lata Mangeshkar	4:41
3	"Baar Baar Din Ye Aaye – Happy Birthday To You"	Mohammed Rafi	7:08
4	"Hum To Tere Aashiq Hain"	Mukesh, Lata Mangeshkar	6:03
5	"Mast Baharon Ka Main Aashiq"	Mohammed Rafi	6:20
6	"Tumse O Haseena"	Mohammed Rafi, Suman Kalyanpur	5:55
7	"Hum To Tere Aashiq Hain (Revival)"	Mukesh, Lata Mangeshkar	
8	"Mast Baharon Ka Main Aashiq (Revival)"	Mohammed Rafi	
9	"Tumse O Haseena (Revival)"	Mohammed Rafi, Suman Kalyanpur	
