= Gudachari 116 =

1966 Telugu spy film by M. Mallikarjuna Rao

- Poster
- Directed by: M. Mallikarjuna Rao
- Dialogues by: Aarudhra
- Produced by: Sundarlal Nahta; Doondi
- Starring: Krishna; Jayalalitha; Rajanala; Mukkamala
- Cinematography: Ravikant Nagaich
- Edited by: N. S. Prakasam
- Music by: T. Chalapathi Rao
- Production companies: Rajalakshmi Productions; Vijaya Lakshmi Pictures
- Distributed by: East India
- Release date: 11 August 1966
- Running time: 170 minutes
- Country: India
- Language: Telugu

Gudachari 116 (transl. Agent 116) is a 1966 Indian Telugu-language spy film directed by M. Mallikarjuna Rao. Produced by Sundarlal Nahta and Doondi, the film stars Krishna in the titular role, alongside Jayalalitha, Rajanala, and Mukkamala in pivotal roles. It is considered the first spy film in Telugu cinema and among the earliest in Indian cinema.

Released on 11 August 1966, Gudachari 116 was a commercial success and marked a turning point in Krishna's career. It was his third film as a lead actor and his first as a solo lead. The film's success propelled Krishna to stardom, earning him the nickname "Andhra James Bond" and establishing him as a prominent figure in Telugu cinema. Following this, Krishna's career gained momentum, with the actor signing 20 more films. The film's popularity also inspired several unrelated sequels and a Hindi remake titled Farz (1967).

== Plot ==
Secret Agent 116 named Gopi has been assigned the case of the homicide of a fellow spy, Secret Agent 303, by the head of CID. 303 had found evidence that can help identify the perpetrators. During this investigation, Gopi meets lovely Radha in a flight journey, and both end up falling in love with each other. The traitor responsible for the killing of agent 303 has gone to meet 303's sister Kamala and tells her that he is a CID inspector and investigating his brother's case, warning that her brother's killer may make an attempt on her pretending as his colleague and friend.

He elsewhere unsuccessfully continued on the life of agent 116. 116 goes to meet Kamala and sees 303's portrait and notes down the studio photographer's name, but Kamala is convinced that 116 is the killer of her brother. Kamala is approached by another mafia don, Damodar, for her help in eliminating 116, to which she agrees. Damodar turns out to be Radha's father, when Radha introduces him, Gopi gets suspicious about him and commences a background check, which reveals that her father is a gangster.

As he sets out his case against Damodar, he continues his romance with Radha. During Radha's birthday party, Damodar directs his henchman to kill 116, who escapes after some car chase. 116 hesitantly reveals to Radha that her father is a gangster. Heartbroken, Radha confronts her father, who tells her that he was forced into his life of crime and terrorism, and some other person controls them all, which was overheard by 116 and his assistant, who are hiding outside. 116 goes out for his search for the real culprit to a skyscraper apartment where Kamala was plotted. Kamala seductively dances and mixes some intoxicant pill in his drink, which overlooked by 116, eventually made him senseless.

Goons take him to their secret den in the city outskirts, along with Radha, who mistakes them as Hospital Ward boys. In the den, 116 captures one of the goon leaders and forces him to reveal some information. 116 fights his way with Radha and escapes in a vehicle. In the meantime, CID agents trace a letter leading to clues regarding the Chinese conspiracy to destabilize the nation and accommodated by traitors inside, led by a person wearing a Mao uniform named Supremo, who only speaks a few broken English sentences. The rest of the movie follows 116's efforts to thwart a foreign conspiracy against India.

== Cast ==
- Krishna as Gopi (Agent 116)
- Jayalalitha as Radha
- Sobhan Babu as Siva Rao (Agent 303)
- Rajanala as Supremo
- Mukkamala as Damodaram
- Relangi as Simhachalam
- Ramana Reddy as Appalaraju
- Rajababu as Nookaraju
- Nerella Venu Madhav as Subbaraju
- Raavi Kondala Rao as Photo studio owner
- P. J. Sarma as Supremo's assistant
- T. Chalapathi Rao as himself (cameo)
- A. V. Subbarao Jr. as CID Chief
- Jagga Rao as Supremo's assistant
- Nellore Kantha Rao
- Geetanjali as Suguna
- Vennira Aadai Nirmala as Vasantha

== Production ==
=== Development ===
The concept for Gudachari 116 emerged following the global success of the James Bond films in the early 1960s. Producer P. Doondeswara Rao (Doondi), sought to create a similar spy thriller for Telugu audiences. He turned to writer Aarudra, a close friend and fan of Ian Fleming's novels and the Bond films, to develop a story in the James Bond style. Aarudra's script impressed both Doondi and his partner, Sundarlal Nahata, leading them to pursue the project despite the higher production costs.

The film was inspired by the 1964 French spy film Banco à Bangkok pour OSS 117, and drew elements from James Bond films such as Dr. No (1962). Gudachari 116 was adapted for Telugu audiences with modifications, making it the first James Bond-style film in the language and featuring distinctive action sequences and stunts. The influence of "Pocket Detective" books written by Aarudra also contributed to the film's unique appeal.

=== Cast and crew ===
Krishna attracted the attention of producers Doondi and Sundarlal Nahata in Thene Manassulu (1965). They were impressed by his daring stunt of jumping onto a speeding car without a double. Recognizing his potential and the rising interest in detective fiction, the producers decided to cast him in a spy thriller. Initially, Doondi requested Adurthi Subba Rao, the director of Thene Manassulu, to send their lead actor. However, Subba Rao sent Ram Mohan, another lead from the film. After resolving this mix-up, Krishna was ultimately cast in the lead role.

Doondi cast Krishna while he was still working in Kanne Manasulu (1966). This led to a long collaboration between Krishna and Doondi, resulting in 25 films together. The film was directed by M. Mallikarjuna Rao, who was the son of veteran actress Sriranjani Sr. and had previously directed the mythological film Prameelarjuneeyam (1965). Mallikarjuna Rao went on to direct 13 more films with Krishna. The production team of Gudachari 116 included cinematographer Ravikant Nagaich, and music director Tatineni Chalapathi Rao. Tamil actress Jayalalithaa starred as the heroine. The film also featured guest appearances by Relangi, Sobhan Babu, Rajanala, and Ramana Reddy, with notable cast members such as Nellore Kantharao and Raavi Kondala Rao.

=== Filming ===
The songs "O Vaalu Choopula Vanneladi" (Deeri Diridiri Deeridee) and "Nuvvu Na Mundunte" were filmed in Ooty, while the duet "Padileche Keratam Choodu" was shot at Mahabalipuram. Notably, "Nuvvu Na Mundunte" was filmed in colour, while the rest of the film was in black-and-white.

== Music ==
Music for the film was composed by T. Chalapathi Rao.

Track list
No.	Title	Lyrics	Singer(s)	Length
1.	"Chempameeda Chitikeste Sompulanni"	Arudra	Ghantasala
2.	"Manasuteera Navvule Navvule Navvali"	Arudra	Ghantasala, P. Susheela, and group
3.	"Neetho Yedo Paniundi"	Arudra	P. Susheela
4.	"Nuvvu Naa Mundunte Ninnalaa Choostunte"	C. Narayana Reddy	Ghantasala, P. Susheela
5.	"O Vaalu Choopula Vanneladi"	Arudra	Ghantasala
6.	"Padileche Keratam Choodu"	Arudra	P. Susheela
7.	"Yerra Buggala Meeda Manasaite"	C. Narayana Reddy	Ghantasala, P. Susheela, and group

== Reception ==
Gudachari 116 faced stiff competition from N. T. Rama Rao's Sri Krishna Tulabharam, a Mahabharata--themed film released in the same month of August 1966. Despite this, Gudachari 116 emerged as a box-office success.

== Legacy ==
Gudachari 116's innovative action scenes and dramatic storytelling influenced the style and approach of future Telugu action films. The film marked a significant milestone in Krishna's career, leading to his booking for 20 films shortly after its release and earning him the nickname "Andhra James Bond." It established Krishna as a major figure in Telugu cinema and paved the way for his continued success.

Krishna solidified his status with a series of notable spy thrillers, including James Bond 777 (1971), Agent Gopi (1978), Rahasya Gudachari (1981), and Gudachari 117 (1989), further cementing his reputation in the industry. After Gudachari 116, Krishna continued his collaboration with producer Doondi, working on approximately 25 films together. Additionally, V. Ramachandra Rao, an assistant director on Gudachari 116, directed over a dozen films featuring Krishna.
