= Bhai Ho To Aisa =

- Theatrical release poster
- Directed by: Manmohan Desai
- Written by: Prayagraj (dialogues)
- Screenplay by: K.B. Pathak
- Story by: K.B. Pathak
- Based on: Aastiparulu (1966)
- Produced by: A.K.Nadiadwala
- Starring: Jeetendra; Hema Malini; Shatrughan Sinha
- Cinematography: N.V. Srinivas
- Edited by: Kamalakar
- Music by: Sonik Omi
- Production company: A.K.Movies Pvt Ltd
- Release date: 11 May 1972
- Running time: 132 minutes
- Country: India
- Language: Hindi

Bhai Ho To Aisa (transl. A brother must be like this) is a 1972 Indian Hindi-language action film, produced by A.K. Nadiadwala under the A.K. Movies Pvt Ltd banner and directed by Manmohan Desai. It stars Jeetendra, Hema Malini, Shatrughan Sinha and music composed by Sonik-Omi. The film is a remake of 1966 Telugu film Aastiparulu which was also remade earlier in Tamil in 1968 as En Thambi.

== Plot ==
Thakur is a rich and wealthy man. He has two sons, the elder is Ram, who is married but frequents a prostitute named Munnibai. The second son is Bharat, who is unmarried, good, virtuous, devoted to his family, and is expected to marry Roopa. While disciplining his elder son, Thakur has a heart attack and passes away, leaving the administration of the estate to his younger son and daughter-in-law, the wife of Ram, Gayatri. This does not augur well with Ram and Mamaji, and they attempt to force Bharat to sign the estate over to them. When they fail, they conspire to kill him and take over the estate from Gayatri. Bharat overhears this and goes along with Ram's plan to kill him. He then returns as Daku Mangal Singh, his look-alike, in order to set things right. Things seem to be going well until Bharat finds himself in a tight corner when he is accused of faking his own death.

== Cast ==
- Jeetendra as Bharat Singh
- Hema Malini as Roopa
- Shatrughan Sinha as Ram Singh
- Indrani Mukherjee as Gayatri
- Ranjeet as Daku Mangal Singh
- Bipin Gupta as Guru
- Bela Bose as Munni Bai
- Praveen Paul as Khushi's Mother
- Ramayan Tiwari as Daku Maan Singh
- Viju Khote as Chandravadan
- Jankidas
- Jagdeep as Jaggi
- Jayshree T. as Khushi
- Jeevan as Mamaji

== Soundtrack ==
Song	Singer
"Bol Meri Gudiya, Gudde Ne Sang Jayegi, Jake Piya Pyare"	Kishore Kumar, Lata Mangeshkar
"Aaja Meri Jawani Ko"	Lata Mangeshkar
"Chor Humne Phansaya"	Lata Mangeshkar
"Ae Phooljhadi, Ae Gulchhadi"	Mohammed Rafi
"Sun Le Naag Raja"	Asha Bhosle
