= Pyar Ki Kahani =

- Directed by: Ravikant Nagaich
- Produced by: Doondi
- Starring: Amitabh Bachchan; Tanuja
- Music by: R. D. Burman
- Release date: 30 April 1971
- Country: India
- Language: Hindi

Pyar Ki Kahani (transl. The Story of Love) is a 1971 Indian Hindi-language romantic drama film directed by Ravikant Nagaich. It is a remake of the 1964 Tamil film Kai Kodutha Deivam. The film stars Amitabh Bachchan and Tanuja.

== Plot ==
Although well qualified, Ram Chand (Amitabh Bachchan) is unable to obtain suitable employment, and works as a peon in an organization. One day, he meets with Ravi Chand (Anil Dhawan), who is on the verge of committing suicide, he counsels him against this, as well as permitting him to live with him. Ravi gets employed in the same office as Ram, albeit as a Manager, and falls in love and marries a co-worker named Lata (Farida Jalal). Ram's parents would like him to get married too, and he goes to see them and meets his bride-to-be, Kusum Sharma (Tanuja). Ram sends a photograph of Kusum for approval to Ravi and Lata, and is disappointed to learn that Ravi does not approve of Kusum. When Ram attempts to find out the reason behind his disapproval, Ravi gives very elusive responses, and Ram takes it upon himself to find out why Ravi disapproves of Kusum so much. It is then Ram will come to know of the shocking truth behind the relationship between Kusum and Ravi, and about Kusum's reputation.

== Cast ==
- Amitabh Bachchan as Ram Chand
- Tanuja as Kusum Sharma
- Farida Jalal as Lata
- Anil Dhawan as Ravi
- Bipin Gupta as Mahadev Sharma
- Madhu Chanda as Shakuntala Sharma
- Agha as Advocate N. Prasad
- Prem Chopra as Banke
- Mukri as Banke's Party Member Kanhaiyalal
- Mohan Choti as Banke's Party Member Ramesh
- Birbal as Banke's Party Member Balraj
- Yunus Parvez as Gulabchand (Ram's Father)
- Praveen Paul as Sarla, Ram's mother
- Dipanjan Saha as Science Student Bhuvaneshwar

== Production ==
The lead role was initially given to Jeetendra, but because of the film industry's imposed limit of a maximum of 6 films to be done as a leading role by an actor, Jeetendra had to give up this film as he was shooting for 6 films that year; the role went to Amitabh Bachchan.

== Soundtrack ==
No.	Title	Singer(s)
1.	"Gori O Gori, Chori Ho Chori, Mera Jiya Le Gayi Chakori"	Kishore Kumar
2.	"Ek Khabar Aayi Suno"	Kishore Kumar, Lata Mangeshkar
3.	"Baby Tu Chhoti Hai"	Lata Mangeshkar, Usha Mangeshkar
4.	"Koyi Aur Duniya Mein Tumsa"	Mohammad Rafi
5.	"Ek Pate Ki Baat Bataoon Sun"	Mohammad Rafi
