= Dr. Anand =

- Theatrical release poster
- Directed by: V. Madhusudhana Rao
- Written by: Acharya Aatreya (dialogues)
- Screenplay by: V. Madhusudhana Rao
- Story by: V. Madhusudhana Rao; Acharya Aatreya
- Produced by: D. Venkatapathi Reddy
- Starring: N. T. Rama Rao; Anjali Devi; Kanchana
- Cinematography: C. Nageswara Rao
- Edited by: Akkineni Sanjeevi
- Music by: K. V. Mahadevan
- Production company: Ravindra Art Productions
- Release date: 14 October 1966
- Country: India
- Language: Telugu

Dr. Anand is a 1966 Indian Telugu-language drama film, produced by D. Venkatapathi Reddy under the Ravindra Art Productions banner and directed by V. Madhusudhana Rao. It stars N. T. Rama Rao, Anjali Devi, Kanchana with music composed by K. V. Mahadevan.

== Cast ==
- N. T. Rama Rao as Dr. Anand
- Anjali Devi as Madhavi
- Kanchana as Vijaya
- V. Nagayya as Justice Dharma Rao
- Ramana Reddy as Dr. Mrutyunjaya Rao
- Padmanabham as Chalapathi Rao
- Raja Babu as Nookalu
- Chadalavada as Kotayya
- Rama Prabha as Mathi
- Baby Padmini as Baby
- Master Adinarayana Rao as Babu

== Soundtrack ==
Dr. Anand

Film score by K. V. Mahadevan
- Released: 1966
- Genre: Soundtrack
- Length: 31:00
- Producer: K. V. Mahadevan

Music composed by K. V. Mahadevan. Music released by Audio Company.

S. No.	Song title	Lyrics	Singers	length
1	"Chakkani Challani Illu"	Acharya Aatreya	Ghantasala	3:23
2	"Neela Mohana Rara"	Devulapalli	P. Susheela	7:10
3	"Perugutunnadi Hrudyam"	Acharya Aatreya	P. Susheela	3:35
4	"Madhiloni Na Swamy"	C. Narayana Reddy	P. Susheela	3:40
5	"Neelala Kannulatho"	C. Narayana Reddy	Ghantasala, P. Susheela	3:12
6	"Musugu Thiyavoyi"	Acharya Aatreya	P. B. Srinivas	2:41
7	"Thaluku Beluku Cheeradhana"	Kosaraju	Pithapuram, Swarnalatha	3:20
8	"Chakkani Challani Illu" - II	Acharya Aatreya	P. Susheela	3:59
