= Nerella Venu Madhav =

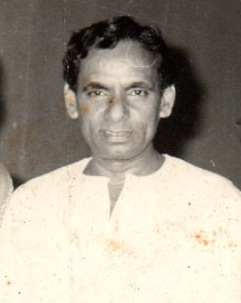
- Photo of Nerella Venu Madhav

Background information
- Born: 28 December 1932; Warangal, Hyderabad state
- Died: 19 June 2018 (aged 85) Warangal, Telangana, India
- Genre: Impressionist
- Occupation: Mimicry
- Years active: 1947–2015
- Website: www.nerellavenumadhav.com

Nerella Venu Madhav (28 December 1932 – 19 June 2018) was an Indian impressionist and ventriloquist. He rose to popularity imitating celebrities, politicians, local dialects, Nizams and was the first to perform at the United Nations headquarters. He started a diploma course at Telugu University, a first in the world. He is often regarded as father of Indian mimicry. He is also hailed as the pioneer and maestro of mimicry in India.

== Early life ==
Nerella Venu Madhav was born in Mattewada, Warangal, Hyderabad state to an industrialist, Hari and Srilakshmi. His father had a great admiration for literature. He completed his matriculation in 1950, and joined the Warangal Arts and Science College for a bachelor's degree in 1952. The principal of the college, B. V. Ram Narasu was very impressed by his talent, and even presented him with ₹60 as scholarship for good conduct, despite opposition from some lecturers. He encouraged him to take up mimicry. As a young boy, he used to play pranks by imitating people in his village to perfection. He used to mimic the people who visited his house and friends.

== Career ==
Venu Madhav started his career in 1947 at the age of 16. He rose to popularity, coming from a village, imitating celebrities, politicians, local Telangana dialect. He worked as a school teacher in Mattewad Middle School in Hanamkonda in 1953. He also started and worked as a Mimicry faculty in Telugu University. He loved Telugu, Urdu and English literature, and greatly admired Indian classical music.

He started his mimicry career with an impression of the famous Telugu actor, V. Nagayya. He performed in Telugu, English, Urdu, Hindi, Tamil and also musical instruments. He has toured all over the world and was popular for imitating world leaders, Hollywood celebrities and background score. His mimicry of a scene in the popular Hollywood movie, Mckenna's Gold was legendary. His imitation of Pritviraj Kapur in Mughal-e-Azam; imitation of Karunanidhi's voice using only one English word 'gibberish' was also popular. He used to imitate tall personalities, without offending them. He received their validation for his perfection.

He was the first mimic in the world who performed at the United Nations Organization, New York City.

He was nominated as a Member of Legislative Council of Andhra Pradesh by the then Chief Minister P. V. Narasimha Rao in 1972 to 1978. His birthday, 28 December, is celebrated as World Mimicry Day by some of his students.

He was encouraged by film producer, B. N. Reddy to act in films. He acted in 12 Tollywood movies like Gudachari 116 starring Krishna and Jayalalitha.

He wrote a book on art of mimicry in Telugu language called Mimicry Kala. Popular mimic and ventriloquist Mimicry Srinivos is his favourite disciple.

=== Other honours ===
An auditorium in Warangal is named in his honour as Dr. Nerella Venu Madhav Kalaa Pranganam. The venue hosted a mimicry festival on his 80th birthday, 28 December by Greater Warangal Municipal Corporation at Hanamkonda Public Gardens and was officially named in 2011.

== Death ==
Venu Madhav died on 19 June 2018 at 10:30 AM in Warangal, after a brief illness. He lived all his life in Warangal.

The Government of Telangana accorded a state funeral, the Chief Minister announced the building of an auditorium at Public Gardens with his statue and an educational institute to be named after him.

== Personal life ==
He married Shobhavati in 1975 and has two sons; Srinath and Radhakrishna; and two daughters, Vasanthi and Lakshmi Tulasi, a mimicry artiste and studied under her father.

== Selected filmography ==
Year	Film	Role
1966	Gudachari 116	Subbaraju
1967	Devuni Gelichina Manavudu	Nijabaludu

== Awards and honours ==
- Padma Shri for performing arts from the Government of India in 2001
- *Raja-Lakshmi Award in 1981 by Sri Raja-Lakshmi Foundation Chennai
- Kala Prapoorna title from Andhra University (Vishakhapatnam) in 1978
- Honorary Doctorates by Andhra University, IGNOU and Kakatiya University
- Lifetime Achievement Award presented by the Telugu Book of Records & Telangana Recordula Pustakam (The Book of Telangana Records) on his 83rd birthday, on 28 December 2015 at Hanumakonda.
- Gajarohanam by Tirumala Tirupati Devasthanam
- Greater Warangal Municipal Corporation (GWMC) has named a street in Warangal city after him
- Government of Telangana felicitation on Telangana Formation Day in 2018
- India Post honored by releasing a postal cover in December 2017
