= Aarudra =

Indian lyricist and writer (1925–1998)

Arudra
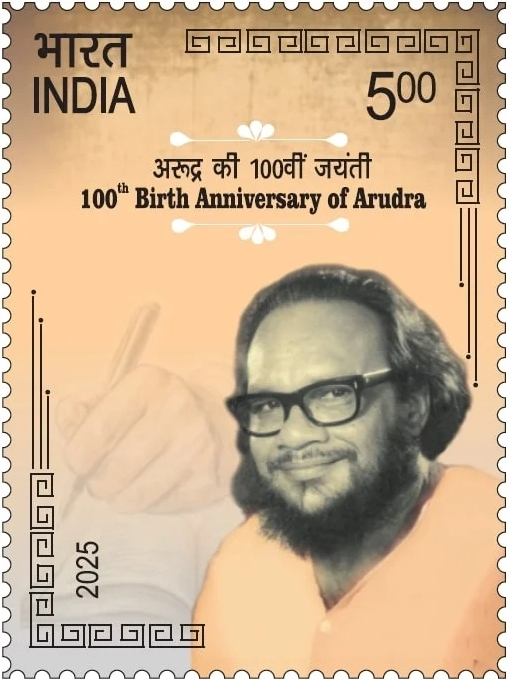
- Aarudra on a 2025 stamp of India
- Born: Bhagavatula Sadasiva Sankara Sastry; 31 August 1925; Visakhapatnam, Andhra Pradesh, India
- Died: 4 June 1998 (aged 72)
- Occupations: Poet; lyricist; songwriter; translator; writer
- Spouse: K. Rama Lakshmi
- Relatives: Aswini Bhamidi (Sister)
- Awards: Sahitya Akademi Award, 1987

Arudra (born Bhagavatula Sadasiva Sankara Sastry; 31 August 1925 – 4 June 1998) was an Indian author, poet, lyricist, translator, publisher, dramatist, playwright, and an expert on Telugu literature. He is also known for his works in Telugu cinema as a lyricist, dialogue writer, and story writer. He received the Sahitya Akademi Award in 1987.

== Early life ==
Aarudra was born in Yelamanchili, Anakapalli district, Andhra Pradesh, India on 31 August 1925. Aarudra is the nephew of Telugu poet Sri Sri. After primary education, he shifted to Vizianagaram in 1942 for his college education. He was attracted to communism after coming into contact with people like Ronanki Appalaswami and Chaganti Somayajulu.

He joined the Indian Air Force as a Band Boy in 1943 and served it till 1947. He shifted to Madras and worked as editor of Anandavani magazine for two years. Joining the film industry in 1949, he wrote lyrics and dialogues for many films. He married noted writer K. Rama Lakshmi (a columnist and a writer-critic in her own right) in 1954.

== Literary works ==
Tvamevaham (You are none other than me) and Samagra Andhra Sahityam (An Encyclopedia of Telugu Literature) are his landmark works. He wrote poetry such as Koonalamma Padaalu, reminiscences of the Second World War. He translated the Tamil treatise Tirukkural into Telugu. He belonged to the school of progressive writers such as Abhyudaya Rachayitala Sangham.

=== Tvamevaham ===
Tvamevaaham written in 1948 was based on the contemporary violence and lawlessness during the Razakar movement in the princely state of Hyderabad. The Razakar attrocoties were sponsored by the Nizam against his own people who wanted to overthrow him in favor of democracy and join the Indian Union. In this kaavyam, death spoke to a human being and says, "you and I are the same (Tvamevaaham)".

=== The Samagra Andhra Sahityam ===
Arudra first published the SAS in 12 parts between 1965 and 1968. It spans the Telugu literature from the 9th century CE to modern times. He chronicled the history of Telugu Literature in 12 volumes:

1. Early and Chalukya Era (From 8 – 9c CE to end of 12c CE)
2. Kakatiya dynasty (1200–1290 CE)
3. Padmanayaka Era (1337–1399 CE)
4. Reddiraju Era (1400–1450 CE)
5. Early Rayala (Vijayanagara) (1450–1500 CE)
6. Later Rayala (Vijayanagara) (1500–1550 CE)
7. Nawabs (1550–1600 CE)
8. Nayaka Kings (1600–1670 CE)
9. Later Nayaka Kings (1670–1750 CE)
10. East India Company (1750–1850 CE)
11. Zamindari (1850–1900 CE)
12. Modern (1900 CE onwards)

=== How is Sita related to Rama? ===
Ramudiki Sita Yemautundi? or How is Sita related to Rama?, put before the public the riddle of Mandodari, Sita and Hanuman and their origins in a lucid and scholarly way. It was an attempt at cracking the Valmiki-Ramayana code and in the process de-mystified the story of Rama to the middle-class, literate, Telugu reader.

The book explores the Buddhist and Jain sources of the story of Rama. It also surveys the Khotan Siam (Thai), Laos, and Malaysian versions of the story of Rama. Here is a sampling from the 'Dasaratha Jataka ', a Buddhist Tale:

Buddha narrates the 'Dasaratha Jataka' tale to a householder who was grieving the death of his son....Long long ago.. Dasaratha was the king of Varanasi. He had sixteen thousand wives.The Queen had two sons and a daughter.The eldest son was called Ramapundit and the younger one was called Laxmanpundit. The daughter was called Sitadevi. The Queen dies after sometime. Dasaratha marries again, and comes to like her the most. She begets a son named Bharata...When Ramapundit returns from the forest, he marries Sita and rules for 16000 years...Bodhisatta concludes the story stating that Dasaratha was none other than Shuddhodana (Father of Buddha) in an earlier reincarnation. Similarly, Sita was none other than Rahulmata (Mother of Rahul or Wife of Buddha) and Ramapundit was none other than Buddha himself.

Aarudra's questions like "How is Sita related to Rama?" or "Were they just Husband and wife?" may sound naive or sacrilegious but a serious study of genealogies, as revealed from different sources, logically leads to them. To deny the existence of such stories, per Arudra, would have amounted to intellectual dishonesty.

=== List of his works ===
- Poems (Kavyas): Tvamevaaham, Sinivaali, koonalamma Padaalu, Intinti Pajyaalu. America Intinti pajyaalu, sitakoka chilukalu (radio play)
- Lyrics: Gaayaalu-Geyaalu, Pailaapacceesu, Yencina Padyaalu, Yetikedadi, Kondagaali Tirigindi.
- Translations: Veera Telangaana Viplava Geetalu (from English), Vennela-Vesavi (from Tamil), Kabeer Bhaavaalu and Batvaada-Arudra (from Hindi).
- Dramas: Udgeedha, Geyanaatika, Raadaari Bangla, Saalabhanjikalu.
- Dual Poetry: Rukkuteswara Satakam (with Sri Sri), Meemee (with Sri Sri and Varada)
- Research Work: Samagraandhra Saahityam, Arudra Vyaasapeetham, Raamudi ki Seeta Yemavutundi?,
- Other works: Arudra kathalu, Mahaneeyulu, Chadarangam, cinema scripts and lyrics.

== Filmography ==
1. Beedala Patlu (1950) (lyrics)
2. Kanna Talli (1953) (writer)
3. Pakka Inti Ammayi (1953) (adapted screenplay)
4. Veera Kankanam (1957) (dialogue)
5. Chenchu Lakshmi (1958) (lyrics)
6. Illarikam (1959) (dialogue)
7. Jayabheri (1959) (lyrics)
8. Aradhana (1962) (lyrics)
9. Bhishma (1962) (lyrics)
10. Dakshayagnam (1962) (writer)
11. Manchi Kutumbam (1965) (lyrics)
12. Gudachari 116 (1966) (story and dialogue)
13. Farz (1967) (story)
14. The Train (1970) (screenplay)- Hindi
15. Mosagallaku Mosagadu (1971) (story and dialogues)
16. Andala Ramudu (1973) (lyrics)
17. Muthyala Muggu (1975) (lyrics)
18. Yashoda Krishna (1975) (writer)
19. Mahakavi Kshetrayya (1976) (writer)
20. Daana Veera Soora Karna (1977) (lyrics)
21. Mallepoovu (1977) (lyrics)
22. Anugraham (1978) (dialogue)
23. Kondura (The Sage from the Sea) (1978) (writer)
24. Thoorpu Velle Railu (1979) (lyrics)
25. Pelli Pusthakam (1991) (lyrics)
26. Mr. Pellam (1993) (lyrics)

=== Film songs ===
His film songs are compiled and published by his wife K. Ramalaxmi in five volumes.

Year	Film title	Popular song/s
1965	Manchi Kutumbam	Manase Andhala Brundhavanam; Preminchuta Pillala Vantu
1965	Pandava Vanavasam	Baavaa Baavaa Panneeru
1965	Preminchi Choodu	Mee Andala Chetulu Kandenu Papam
1965	Veerabhimanyu	Adigo Navalokam Velase Manakosam; Rambha Urvasi Taladanne
1965	Zamindar	Chukkalu Podiche VelaNene Nene Letha
1966	Antastulu	Vinara Vissanna Ne Vedam Cheputa
1967	Bhakta Prahlada	Siri Siri Laali Chinnari Laali
1967	Gudachari 116	Manasuteera Navvule Navvule Navvali
1967	Sakshi	Amma Kadupu Challaga
1968	Bandipotu Dongalu	Gandara Ganda Soggadivanta
1968	Ramu	Pachani Chettu Okati
1970	Akka Chellelu	Chakachakalade Paduchundi
1972	Iddaru Ammayilu	Oho Mister Brahmachari
1978	Mana Voori Pandavulu	Orey Pichchi Sannasi; Pandavulu Pandavulu Thummeda
1978	Vayasu Pilichindi	Muthyamalle Merisipoye Mallemogga; Nuvvadigindi Enaadaina Kaadhannaana
1991	Pelli Pustakam	Srirastu Subhamastu
1993	Mister Pellam	Adagavayya Ayyagari
