= V. Madhusudhana Rao =

Indian film director

- వీరమాచనేని మధుసూదనరావు
- Born: Veeramachaneni Madhusudhana Rao; 14 June 1923; Krishna district, Madras Presidency, British India
- Died: 11 January 2012 (aged 88); Hyderabad, Andhra Pradesh, India
- Occupations: Film director and script writer
- Spouse: Veeramachaneni Sarojini

Veeramachaneni Madhusudhana Rao (14 June 1923 – 11 January 2012) was an Indian film director, producer, and screenwriter, known for his works predominantly in Telugu cinema. He is popularly known as 'Victory' Madhusudhana Rao. He directed nearly 70 films, including musical hits such as Annapurna (1960), Aradhana (1962), Aathma Balam (1964), Zamindar (1965), Antastulu (1965), Aatmiyulu (1969), and Krishnaveni (1974). He also produced Swati Kiranam (1992). Six of his films received the Nandi Award for Best Feature Film, and in 1965, he was awarded the National Film Award for Best Feature Film in Telugu for Antastulu. He was honoured with the prestigious Raghupathi Venkaiah Award for lifetime contributions to Telugu cinema by the Government of Andhra Pradesh in 1997.

== Filmography ==
=== Director ===
Telugu

1. Sati Tulasi (1959)
2. Annapurna (1960)
3. Taxi Ramudu (1961)
4. Padandi Munduku (1962)
5. Rakta Sambandham (1962)
6. Appagintalu (1962)
7. Aradhana (1962)
8. Lakshadhikari (1963)
9. Aathma Balam (1964)
10. Gudi Gantalu (1964)
11. Zamindar (1965)
12. Antastulu (1965)
13. Veerabhimanyu (1965)
14. Aastiparulu (1966)
15. Dr. Anand (1966)
16. Manchi Kutumbam (1968)
17. Lakshmi Nivasam (1968)
18. Adrushtavanthulu (1969)
19. Aatmiyulu (1969)
20. Manushulu Marali (1969)
21. Pavitra Bandham (1971)
22. Amaayakuraalu (1971)
23. Kalyana Mandapam (1971)
24. Praja Nayakudu (1972)
25. Manchi Rojulu Vachchaayi (1972)
26. Kanna Koduku (1973)
27. Bhakta Tukaram (1973)
28. Manchivadu (1973)
29. Krishnaveni (1974)
30. Premalu Pellillu (1974)
31. Chakravakam (1974)
32. Jebu Donga (1975)
33. Poruginti Pulla Koora (1976)
34. Iddaroo Iddare (1976)
35. Chakradhari (1977)
36. Raja Ramesh (1977)
37. Judge Gaari Kodalu (1977)
38. Ee Taram Manishi (1977)
39. Edureeta (1977)
40. Vichitra Jeevitham (1978)
41. Angadi Bomma (1978)
42. Mallepoovu (1978)
43. Joodagaadu (1979)
44. Sivamettina Satyam (1979)
45. Andaman Ammayi (1979)
46. Bebbuli (1980)
47. Chandipriya (1980)
48. Superman (1980)
49. Moogaku Maatoste (1980)
50. Samsaram Santanam (1981)
51. Jeevitha Ratham (1981)
52. Puli Bidda (1981)
53. Jagamondi (1981)
54. Bangaru Kanuka (1982)
55. Kasi Yatra (1983)
56. Kanchana Ganga (1984)
57. Vikram (1986)
58. Samrat (1987)
59. Prana Snehithulu (1988)
60. Aatma Katha (1988)
61. Simha Swapnam (1989)
62. Pape Maa Pranam (1989)
63. Krishna Gari Abbayi (1989)

Kannada

1. Sneha Sedu (1978)
2. Ondu Hennu Aaru Kannu (1980)

Hindi

1. Devi (1970)
2. Samaj Ko Badal Dalo (1970)
3. Saas Bhi Kabhi Bahu Thi (1971)
4. Lav Kush (1997)

=== Assistant director ===
- Thodi Kodallu (1957)

== Awards ==
National Film Award

- National Film Award for Best Feature Film in Telugu – Antastulu – 1967

Nandi Awards

- Raghupathi Venkaiah Award for Lifetime Achievement – 1997

Nandi Award for Best Feature Film

- Gudi Gantalu (1964)
- Antastulu (1965)
- Aastiparulu (1966)
- Aatmiyulu (1969)
- Praja Nayakudu (1972)
- Kanchana Ganga (1984)

Nandi Award for Akkineni Award for Best Home-viewing Feature Film – 1991

- Swathi Kiranam

== See also ==
- Raghupathi Venkaiah Award
